= Australia at the 2016 Summer Paralympics =

- IPC code: AUS
- NPC: Australian Paralympic Committee
- Website: www.paralympic.org.au

in Rio de Janeiro
- Competitors: 176 in 16 sports
- Flag bearer (opening): Brad Ness
- Flag bearer (closing): Curtis McGrath
- Medals Ranked 5th: Gold 22 Silver 30 Bronze 29 Total 81

Summer Paralympics appearances (overview)
- 1960; 1964; 1968; 1972; 1976; 1980; 1984; 1988; 1992; 1996; 2000; 2004; 2008; 2012; 2016; 2020; 2024

Australia competed at the 2016 Summer Paralympics in Rio de Janeiro, Brazil, from 7 to 18 September 2016. Australia repeated its 2012 Summer Paralympics achievement in finishing fifth of the medal tally.

Notable achievements at the Games:

- Jessica Gallagher became the first Australian Paralympian to win medals at both the Summer Paralympics and Winter Paralympics by winning a bronze medal in cycling.
- Kurt Fearnley finished Paralympic his career with 13 medals including a silver and bronze in Rio. His silver medal in the Men's Marathon T52-54 meant he had won medals in this event at four successive Paralympics (2004-2016).
- Ellie Cole joined the list of leading Australian Paralympic medallists by winning six medals - 2 gold, 3 silver and 1 bronze. Her medal tally at the end of Rio was 6 gold, 4 silver and bronze.
- Kieran Modra won a bronze medal in cycling and this meant that he had medalled at six Paralympics.
- Samuel Von Einem won Australia first medal in table tennis since Terry Biggs won gold in 1984.
- Jonathon Milne won Australia's first medal in archery since 1968.
- Curtis McGrath and Katie Kelly became Australia's first gold medallists in paracanoe and paratriathlon respectively.
- Dylan Alcott became only the fifth Australian Paralympian to win gold medals in two sports by winning two gold medals in wheelchair tennis. He previously won gold in wheelchair basketball.
- Athletes and teams that won their event again in Rio were: Ellie Cole (swimming), Brenden Hall (swimming), David Nicholas (cycling), Carol Cooke (cycling), Daniel Fitzgibbon/Liesl Tesch (sailing) and the wheelchair rugby team.

== Administration ==
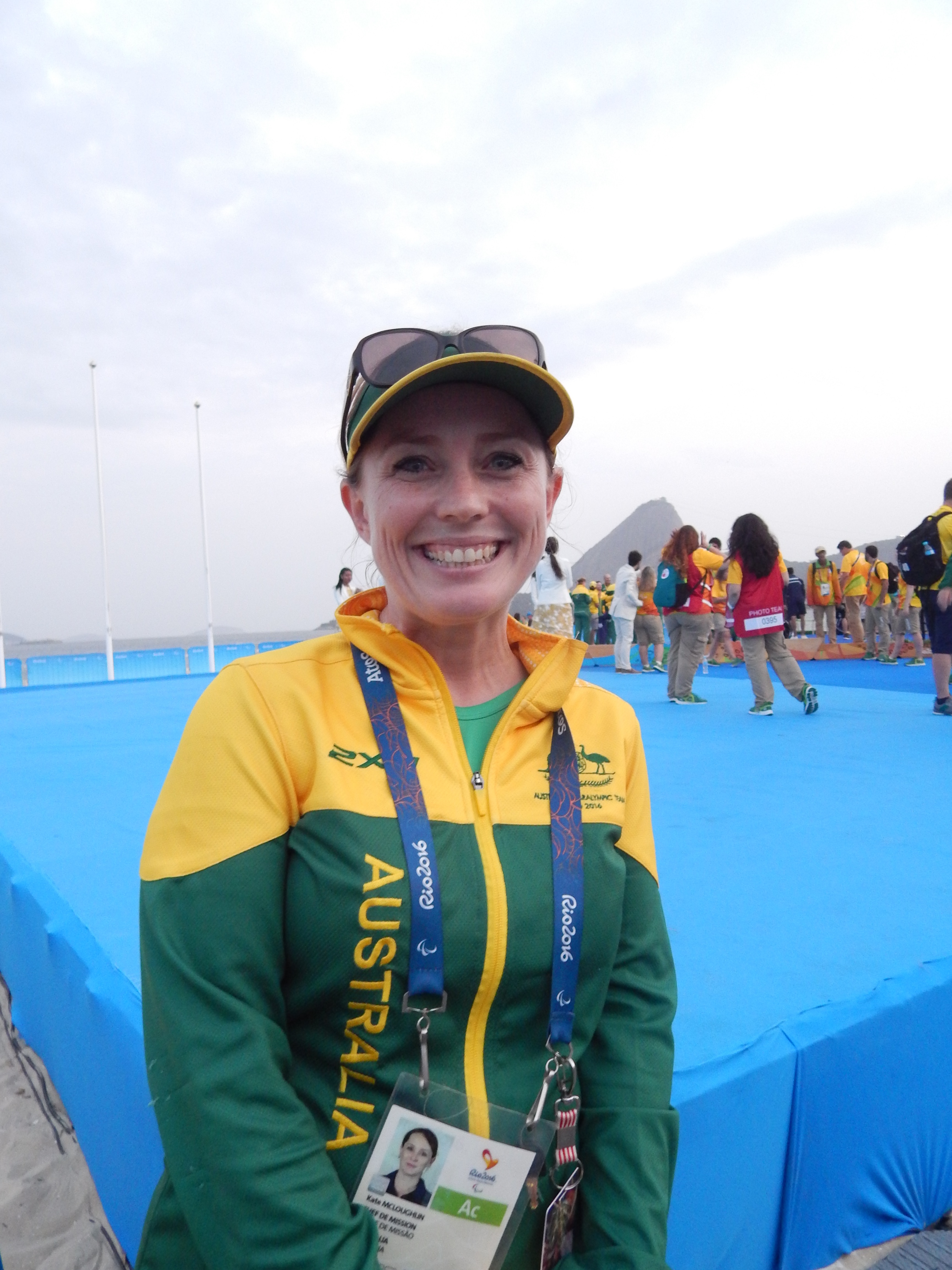
Kate McLoughlin, Australian Chef de Mission at the 2016 Summer Paralympic Games at the sailing event in Rio de Janeiro

In May 2015, the Australian Paralympic Committee (APC) announced Kate McLoughlin as the Chef de Mission. She replaced Jason Hellwig, the former APC CEO, who stepped down from the role. The APC appointed Kurt Fearnley and Daniela Di Toro as team captains. Wheelchair basketballer Brad Ness was announced as the Opening Ceremony flag bearer at a ceremony at the Paralympic Village on 5 September 2016. Curtis McGrath who lost his legs in the Afghanistan war and won Australia's first gold medal in paracanoe at the Games carried the Australian flag in the closing ceremony.

== Fundraising ==
The APC stated that it needed to raise $7 million to fund its Rio 2016 campaign. The majority of APC's funding to send Australian teams to major events originates from fundraising. In January 2016, it launched the Australian Paralympic Foundation to manage its fundraising. Cadbury made the first major donation of $1 million. In the four-year period leading up to Rio, the Australian Sports Commission (ASC) provided $62 million in funding. At the Team Launch, Prime Minister of Australia Malcolm Turnbull stated that the Australian Government had provided nearly $65 million direct funding for the athletes as they prepared to compete in Brazil. To assist with funding raising, its broadcast partner Seven Network organized a Parathon on 5 March 2016.

== Medallists ==
The following Australian competitors won medals at the games.

Medal	Name	Sport	Event	Date
Gold	Lakeisha Patterson	Swimming	Women's 400 m freestyle S8	8 September
Gold	Maddison Elliott	Swimming	Women's 100 m freestyle S8	11 September
Gold	Maddison Elliott	Swimming	Women's 50 m freestyle S8	16 September
Gold	Ellie Cole	Swimming	Women's 100 m backstroke S9	16 September
Gold	David Nicholas	Cycling	Men's individual pursuit C3	9 September
Gold	Brenden Hall	Swimming	Men's 400 metre freestyle S9	9 September
Gold	Rachael Watson	Swimming	Women's 50 m freestyle S4	17 September
Gold	Katie Kelly	Triathlon	Women's PT5 triathlon	11 September
Gold	Brayden Davidson	Athletics	Men's Long Jump - T36	12 September
Gold	Scott Reardon	Athletics	Men's 100 m T42	15 September
Gold	James Turner	Athletics	Men's 800 m T36	17 September
Gold	Timothy Disken	Swimming	Men's 100 metre freestyle S9	12 September
Gold	Dylan Alcott; Heath Davidson	Wheelchair tennis	Men's quad doubles	13 September
Gold	Dylan Alcott	Wheelchair tennis	Men's quad singles	14 September
Gold	Carol Cooke	Cycling	Women's Time Trial T1-2	14 September
Gold	Curtis McGrath	Paracanoe	Men's KL2	15 September
Gold	Tiffany Thomas Kane	Swimming	Women's 100m Breaststroke SM6	15 September
Gold	Ellie Cole, Maddison Elliott, Lakeisha Patterson, Ashleigh McConnell	Swimming	Women's 4 x 100m Freestyle Relay 34 points	15 September
Gold	Carol Cooke	Cycling	Women's Road Race T1-2	16 September
Gold	Daniel Fitzgibbon, Liesl Tesch	Sailing	SKUD 18 – 2 person keelboat	17 September
Gold	Russell Boaden, Jonathon Harris, Colin Harrison	Sailing	Sonar – 3 person keelboat	17 September
Gold	Ryley Batt, Chris Bond, Cameron Carr, Andrew Edmondson, Nazim Erdem, Ben Fawcett, Andrew Harrison, Josh Hose, Jason Lees, Matt Lewis, Ryan Scott, Jayden Warn	Wheelchair Rugby	Wheelchair Rugby	18 September
Silver	Deon Kenzie	Athletics	Men's 1500 m T38	10 September
Silver	Taylor Doyle	Athletics	Women's Long Jump T38	11 September
Silver	Evan O'Hanlon	Athletics	Men's 100m T38	13 September
Silver	Isis Holt	Athletics	Women's 100m T35	14 September
Silver	Isis Holt	Athletics	Women's 200m T35	17 September
Silver	Madison de Rozario	Athletics	Women's 800 m T53	17 September
Silver	Susan Powell	Cycling	Women's individual pursuit C4	8 September
Silver	Amanda Reid	Cycling	Women's 500m time trial C1-3	10 September
Silver	Kyle Bridgwood	Cycling	Men's individual pursuit C4	10 September
Silver	Kyle Bridgwood	Cycling	Men's road time trial C4	14 September
Silver	Alistair Donohoe	Cycling	Men's individual pursuit C5	10 September
Silver	Alistair Donohoe	Cycling	Men's road time trial C5	14 September
Silver	Stuart Tripp	Cycling	Men's road time trial H5	14 September
Silver	Ellie Cole	Swimming	Women's 400 metre freestyle S9	9 September
Silver	Timothy Disken	Swimming	Men's 50 metre freestyle S9	13 September
Silver	Lakeisha Patterson	Swimming	Women's 100 m freestyle S8	11 September
Silver	Lakeisha Patterson	Swimming	Women's 50 m freestyle S8	16 September
Silver	Monique Murphy	Swimming	Women's 400 m freestyle S10	15 September
Silver	Blake Cochrane	Swimming	Men's 100 metre breaststroke SB7	10 September
Silver	Ellie Cole	Swimming	Women's 50 m Freestyle S9	13 September
Silver	Maddison Elliott	Swimming	Women's 100 m backstroke S8	13 September
Silver	Erik Horrie	Rowing	Men's Single Sculls - ASM1x	11 September
Silver	Ellie Cole, Madeleine Scott, Maddison Elliott, Lakeisha Patterson	Swimming	Women's 4 x 100m Medley Relay 34 points	16 September
Silver	Samuel Von Einem	Table tennis	Men's Singles class 11	12 September
Silver	Rheed McCracken	Athletics	Men's 100m - T34	12 September
Silver	Brenden Hall	Swimming	Men's 100 metre freestyle S9	12 September
Silver	Amanda Reynolds	Paracanoe	Women's KL3	15 September
Silver	Angela Ballard, Madison de Rozario, Jemima Moore, Christie Dawes	Athletics	Women's 4x400m Relay - T53-54	15 September
Silver	Matthew Bugg	Sailing	Single person 2.4mR	17 September
Silver	Kurt Fearnley	Athletics	Men's Marathon - T52/53/54	18 September
Bronze	Jonathon Milne	Archery	Men's Individual Compound - Open	14 September
Bronze	Carlee Beattie	Athletics	Women's long jump T45/46/47	9 September
Bronze	Angela Ballard	Athletics	Women's 100 m T53	8 September
Bronze	Angela Ballard	Athletics	Women's 400 m T53	11 September
Bronze	Chad Perris	Athletics	Men's 100 m T13	9 September
Bronze	Claire Keefer	Athletics	Women's Shot Put F41	9 September
Bronze	Todd Hodgetts	Athletics	Men's Shot Put F20	10 September
Bronze	Jodi Elkington-Jones	Athletics	Women's Long Jump - T37	14 September
Bronze	Ella Pardy, Isis Holt, Jodi Elkington-Jones, Erin Cleaver	Athletics	Women's 4x100m Relay - T35-38	15 September
Bronze	Rheed McCracken	Athletics	Men's 800m - T34	14 September
Bronze	Jessica Gallagher; Madison Janssen (pilot)	Cycling	Women's 500m time trial B	9 September
Bronze	Susan Powell	Cycling	Women's road time trial C4	14 September
Bronze	Kieran Modra; David Edwards (pilot)	Cycling	Men's road time trial B	14 September
Bronze	Tiffany Thomas Kane	Swimming	Women's 50m Butterfly S6	9 September
Bronze	Tiffany Thomas Kane	Swimming	Women's 50m Freestyle S6	10 September
Bronze	Tiffany Thomas Kane	Swimming	Women's 200m Individual Medley SM6	12 September
Bronze	Daniel Fox	Swimming	Men's 200 m Freestyle S14	11 September
Bronze	Timothy Disken	Swimming	Men's 200m Individual Medley SM9	11 September
Bronze	Kurt Fearnley	Athletics	Men's 5000m - T53/54	11 September
Bronze	Ellie Cole	Swimming	Women's 100 m Freestyle S9	12 September
Bronze	Matthew Levy	Swimming	Men's 200 m Individual Medley SM7	13 September
Bronze	Brenden Hall	Swimming	Men's 100 metre backstroke S9	16 September
Bronze	Susan Seipel	Paracanoe	Women's KL2	15 September
Bronze	Michael Roeger	Athletics	Men's 1500m - T46	16 September
Bronze	Aaron Chatman	Athletics	Men's High jump - T45-47	16 September
Bronze	Lakeisha Patterson	Swimming	Women's 200 m individual medley SM8	17 September
Bronze	Katja Dedekind	Swimming	Women's 100 m backstroke S13	17 September
Bronze	Kath Proudfoot	Athletics	Women's Shot Put F36	17 September
Bronze	Louise Ellery	Athletics	Women's Shot Put F32	17 September

Medals by sport
Sport	1st place, gold medalist(s)	2nd place, silver medalist(s)	3rd place, bronze medalist(s)	
Archery	0	0	1	1
Athletics	3	9	14	26
Cycling	3	7	3	13
Rowing	0	1	0	1
Paracanoe	1	1	1	3
Sailing	2	1	0	3
Swimming	9	10	10	29
Table tennis	0	1	0	1
Paratriathlon	1	0	0	1
Wheelchair rugby	1	0	0	1
Wheelchair tennis	2	0	0	2
Total	22	30	29	81

Medals by date
Date	1st place, gold medalist(s)	2nd place, silver medalist(s)	3rd place, bronze medalist(s)	Total
8 Sep	1	1	2	4
9 Sep	2	1	4	7
10 Sep	0	5	2	7
11 Sep	2	3	4	9
12 Sep	2	3	2	7
13 Sep	1	4	1	6
14 Sep	2	4	5	11
15 Sep	4	3	2	9
16 Sep	3	2	3	8
17 Sep	4	3	4	11
17 Sep	1	1	0	2
Total	22	30	29	81

Medals by gender
Gender	1st place, gold medalist(s)	2nd place, silver medalist(s)	3rd place, bronze medalist(s)	Total
Male	13	14	13	37
Female	9	24	16	39
Mixed	1	0	0	1
Total	22	30	29	81

=== Multiple medallists ===
The following Australian athletes won multiple medals at the 2016 Paralympic Games:

Name	Medal	Sport	Event
Dylan Alcott	Gold	Wheelchair tennis	Men's quad doubles
Dylan Alcott	Gold	Wheelchair tennis	Men's quad singles
Angela Ballard	Silver	Athletics	Women's 4x400m Relay - T53-54
Angela Ballard	Bronze	Athletics	Women's 100 m T53
Angela Ballard	Bronze	Athletics	Women's 400 m T53
Kyle Bridgwood	Silver	Cycling	Men's individual pursuit C4
Kyle Bridgwood	Silver	Cycling	Men's road time trial C4
Ellie Cole	Gold	Swimming	Women's 4 x 100m freestyle relay 34 points
Ellie Cole	Gold	Swimming	Women's 100 metre backstroke S9
Ellie Cole	Silver	Swimming	Women's 4 x 100m Medley Relay 34 points
Ellie Cole	Silver	Swimming	Women's 400 metre freestyle S9
Ellie Cole	Silver	Swimming	Women's 50 metre freestyle S9
Ellie Cole	Bronze	Swimming	Women's 100 metre freestyle S9
Carol Cooke	Gold	Cycling	Women's road race T1–2
Carol Cooke	Gold	Cycling	Women's road time trial T1-2
Madison de Rozario	Silver	Athletics	Women's 800 m T53
Madison de Rozario	Silver	Athletics	Women's 4x400m Relay - T53-54
Alistair Donohoe	Silver	Cycling	Men's individual pursuit C5
Alistair Donohoe	Silver	Cycling	Men's road time trial C5
Timothy Disken	Gold	Swimming	Men's 100 metre freestyle S9
Timothy Disken	Silver	Swimming	Men's 50 metre freestyle S9
Timothy Disken	Bronze	Swimming	Men's 200 m Individual Medley S9
Maddison Elliott	Gold	Swimming	Women's 4 x 100 metre freestyle relay 34 points
Maddison Elliott	Gold	Swimming	Women's 50 metre freestyle S8
Maddison Elliott	Gold	Swimming	Women's 100 metre freestyle S8
Maddison Elliott	Silver	Swimming	Women's 100 metre backstroke S8
Maddison Elliott	Silver	Swimming	Women's 4 x 100 metre medley relay 34 points
Kurt Fearnley	Silver	Athletics	Men's Marathon - T54
Kurt Fearnley	Bronze	Athletics	Men's 5000m - T54
Brenden Hall	Gold	Swimming	Men's 400 m freestyle S9
Brenden Hall	Silver	Swimming	Men's 100 m freestyle S9
Brenden Hall	Bronze	Swimming	Men's 100 m backstroke S9
Isis Holt	Silver	Athletics	Women's 100m - T35
Isis Holt	Silver	Athletics	Women's 200m - T35
Isis Holt	Bronze	Athletics	Women's 4×100m relay - T35-38
Rheed McCracken	Silver	Athletics	Men's 100m - T34
Rheed McCracken	Bronze	Athletics	Men's 800m - T34
Lakeisha Patterson	Gold	Swimming	Women's 4 x 100 metre freestyle relay 34 points
Lakeisha Patterson	Gold	Swimming	Women's 400 metre freestyle S8
Lakeisha Patterson	Silver	Swimming	Women's 50 metre freestyle S8
Lakeisha Patterson	Silver	Swimming	Women's 100 metre freestyle S8
Lakeisha Patterson	Silver	Swimming	Women's 4 x 100 metre medley relay 34 points
Lakeisha Patterson	Bronze	Swimming	Women's 200 metre individual medley SM8
Susan Powell	Silver	Cycling	Women's individual pursuit C4
Susan Powell	Bronze	Cycling	Women's road time trial C4
Tiffany Thomas Kane	Gold	Swimming	Women's 100m Breaststroke SM6
Tiffany Thomas Kane	Bronze	Swimming	Women's 50 metre butterfly S6
Tiffany Thomas Kane	Bronze	Swimming	Women's 50 metre freestyle S6
Tiffany Thomas Kane	Bronze	Swimming	Women's 200 metre individual medley SM6

== Team ==
List of team members as of 17 September 2016.

In the by discipline sections below, medallists' names are bolded.

^{*} – Indicates the athlete competed in preliminaries but not the final relay.

Sport	Men	Women	Total	Paralympics debut
Archery	1	0	1	1
Athletics	23	22	45	20
Boccia	1	1	2	2
Cycling	8	7	15	6
Equestrian	0	4	4	3
Goalball	0	6	6	1
Paracanoe	3	3	6	6
Paratriathlon	3	4	7	6
Rowing	4	4	8	5
Sailing	5	1	6	0
Shooting	4	2	6	2
Swimming	21	15	36	22
Table tennis	2	3	5	3
Wheelchair basketball	12	0	12	5
Wheelchair rugby	12	0	12	4
Wheelchair tennis	4	1	5	2
**Total**	**103**	**73**	**176**	**88**

Australia was given additional qualification slots in the sports of goalball (six athletes), athletics (two athletes) and wheelchair tennis (one athlete) after Russia was suspended from the Games by the International Paralympic Committee. Two athletes from the original team of 178 did not attend - Emily Tapp due to injury and Michael Gallager due to doping violation.

Several team members have changed their previous Paralympic sports at these Games: Dylan Alcott (wheelchair tennis), Jessica Gallagher (cycling), Daniela Di Toro (table tennis) and Claire McLean (paratriathlon).

== Archery ==
Jonathon Milne earned Australia a spot at the Rio Games following his performance at the 2015 World Archery Para Championships and he was selected to make his debut in the Australian team on 29 July 2016.

Athlete	Event	Ranking round		Round of 32	Round of 16	Quarterfinals	Semifinals	Finals	
Athlete	Event	Score	Seed	Opposition score	Opposition score	Opposition score	Opposition score	Opposition score	Rank
Jonathon Milne	Individual compound open	672	9	Morten Johannessen (DEN); W 143-136	John Stubbs (GBR); W 137-129	Bulent Korkmaz (TUR); W 139-128	Andre Shelby (USA); L 138-139	Xinliang Al (CHN); W 145-142	3rd place, bronze medalist(s)

Milne won Australia first archery medal since 1984 by winning a bronze medal.

== Athletics ==
Australian Paralympic Committee announced a team of 44 athletes on 2 August 2016. An additional two athletes - Tamsin Colley and Jessee Wyatt were added after the Russian suspension. Emily Tapp was selected but forced to withdraw after a burnt leg did not heal in time for the Games.

Men	Women
Sam Carter (d), Aaron Chatman, Jaryd Clifford (d), Gabriel Cole, Richard Colman, Brayden Davidson (d), Guy Henly (d), Todd Hodgetts, Nicholas Hum (d), Kurt Fearnley, Deon Kenzie (d), Jake Lappin, Rheed McCracken, Sam McIntosh, Evan O'Hanlon, Chad Perris (d), Scott Reardon, Michael Roeger, Jayden Sawyer (d), Russell Short, Brad Scott, James Turner (d), Jessee Wyatt (d)	Rae Anderson (d), Angie Ballard, Carlee Beattie, Erin Cleaver (d), Tamsin Colley (d), Brianna Coop (d), Christie Dawes, Madison de Rozario, Taylor Doyle (d), Jodi Elkington-Jones, Louise Ellery, Nicole Harris (d), Madeleine Hogan, Isis Holt (d), Torita Isaac, Claire Keefer (d), Rosemary Little, Brydee Moore, Jemima Moore, Ella Pardy (d), Kath Proudfoot, Sarah Walsh (d)

(d) Paralympic Games debut
Australia won 26 medals – 3 gold, 9 silver and 14 bronze. Gold medalists were – Brayden Davidson, Scott Reardon and James Turner. Russell Short attended his 8th Games, Christine Dawes her 6th Games and Kurt Fearnley his fifth Games.

=== Track events - women ===
Athlete	Events	Heat		Final	
Athlete	Events	Time	Rank	Time	Rank
Angie Ballard	100 m T53	16.80	3 Q	16.59	3rd place, bronze medalist(s)
Angie Ballard	400 m T53	55.26	1 Q	55.28	3rd place, bronze medalist(s)
Angie Ballard	800 m T53	1:48.74	2 Q	1:47.97	4
Angie Ballard	1500 m T54	3:33.05	15	Did not advance	
Tamsin Colley	200 m T36	37.80	11	Did not advance	
Brianna Coop	100 m T35	N/A		15.56	4
Brianna Coop	200 m T35	N/A		33.08	5
Christie Dawes	1500 m T54	3:28.57	5 Q	3:26.00	8
Christie Dawes	5000 m T54	12:15.95	11	Did not advance	
Christie Dawes	Marathon T54	N/A		1:42:59	7
Madison de Rozario	800 m T53	1:54.14	8 Q	1:47.64	2nd place, silver medalist(s)
Madison de Rozario	1500 m T54	3:31.54	9 Q	3:24.33	5
Madison de Rozario	5000 m T54	11:49.71	5 Q	11:54.46	4
Isis Holt	100 m T35	N/A		13.75	2nd place, silver medalist(s)
Isis Holt	200 m T35	N/A		28.79	2nd place, silver medalist(s)
Torita Isaac	400 m T38	N/A		1:04.47	4
Rosemary Little	100 m T34	N/A		19.05	5
Rosemary Little	400 m T34	N/A		1:01.91	4
Rosemary Little	800 m T34	N/A		2:04.10	4
Jemima Moore	100 m T54	18.39	11	Did not advance	
Jemima Moore	400 m T54	1:00.24	11	Did not advance	
Jemima Moore	800 m T54	1:54.37	10	Did not advance	
Ella Pardy	100 m T38	13.30	6 Q	13.22	6
Erin Cleaver; Jodi Elkington-Jones; Isis Holt; Ella Pardy	4 × 100 m T35-38	N/A		55.09	3rd place, bronze medalist(s)
Angie Ballard; Christie Dawes; Madison de Rozario; Jemima Moore; Emily Tapp	4 × 400 m T53-54	N/A		3:46.63	2nd place, silver medalist(s)

=== Track events - men ===
Athlete	Events	Heat		Final	
Athlete	Events	Time	Rank	Time	Rank
Sam Carter	100 m T54	14.59	7 Q	14.46	6
Sam Carter	400 m T54	49.24	15	Did not advance	
Jaryd Clifford	1500 m T13	N/A		3:56.67	7
Jaryd Clifford	5000 m T13	N/A		15:06.64	7
Gabriel Cole	100 m T47	11.14	4	11.17	7
Richard Colman	400 m T53	52.59	12	Did not advance	
Richard Colman	800 m T53	1:43.79	8	Did not advance	
Kurt Fearnley	1500 m T54	3:05.47	4 Q	3:01.35	5
Kurt Fearnley	5000 m T54	10.36.53	8 Q	11:02.37	3rd place, bronze medalist(s)
Kurt Fearnley	Marathon T54	N/A		1:26:17	2nd place, silver medalist(s)
Deon Kenzie	1500 m T38	N/A		4:14.95	2nd place, silver medalist(s)
Jake Lappin	400 m T54	48.88	11	Did not advance	
Jake Lappin	800 m T54	DNS		Did not advance	
Jake Lappin	1500 m T54	3:06.73	12	Did not advance	
Rheed McCracken	100 m T34	15.50 PR	2 Q	15.34	2nd place, silver medalist(s)
Rheed McCracken	800 m T34	1:46.31	3 Q	1:41.25	3rd place, bronze medalist(s)
Sam McIntosh	100 m T52	17.92	4Q	18.13	4
Sam McIntosh	400 m T52	DNS		Did not advance	
Evan O'Hanlon	100 m T38	11.25	2 Q	10.98	2nd place, silver medalist(s)
Chad Perris	100 m T13	10.91	3 Q	10.83	3rd place, bronze medalist(s)
Scott Reardon	100 m T42	12.26 PR	1 Q	12.26 PR	1st place, gold medalist(s)
Michael Roeger	1500 m T46	N/A		4:01.34	3rd place, bronze medalist(s)
Brad Scott	1500 m T37	N/A		4:25.98	6
James Turner	800 m T36	N/A		2:02.39 WR	1st place, gold medalist(s)

=== Field events - women ===
Athlete	Events	Result	Rank
Rae Anderson	Shot put F38	28.46	5
Rae Anderson	Discus F37	27.14	8
Carlee Beattie	Long jump T47	5.57	3rd place, bronze medalist(s)
Erin Cleaver	Long jump T38	4.51	5
Taylor Doyle	Long jump T38	4.62	2nd place, silver medalist(s)
Jodi Elkington-Jones	Long jump T37	4.30	3rd place, bronze medalist(s)
Louise Ellery	Shot put F32	4.19	3rd place, bronze medalist(s)
Nicole Harris	Shot put F20	11.53	7
Madeleine Hogan	Javelin throw F46	39.75	5
Claire Keefer	Shot put F41	8.16	3rd place, bronze medalist(s)
Claire Keefer	Discus F41	23.27	7
Brydee Moore	Shot put F33	5.08	4
Kath Proudfoot	Shot Put F36	9.70	3rd place, bronze medalist(s)
Sarah Walsh	Long jump T44	4.82	6

=== Field events - men ===
Athlete	Events	Result	Rank
Aaron Chatman	High jump T47	1.99	3rd place, bronze medalist(s)
Brayden Davidson	Long jump T36	5.62 PR	1st place, gold medalist(s)
Guy Henly	Discus F37	51.97	4
Todd Hodgetts	Shot put F20	15.82	3rd place, bronze medalist(s)
Nicholas Hum	Long jump T20	6.89	5
Jayden Sawyer	Javelin F38	45.63	5
Russell Short	Shot put F12	15.01	7
Jessee Wyatt	Shot put F33	8.71	4

Legend: Q= Qualified for final; OC= Oceania Record; PR= Paralympic Record; WR= World Record

== Boccia ==
Australia selected Daniel Michel and his ramp assistant Ashlee McClure for their debut Games. Michel is the first player since the 2000 Sydney Paralympics

Athlete	Event	Seeding matches	Round of 32	Round of 16	Quarterfinals	Semifinals	Final / BM	
Athlete	Event	Opposition Score	Opposition Score	Opposition Score	Opposition Score	Opposition Score	Opposition Score	Rank
Daniel Michel	Mixed individual BC3	Jamie McCowan (GBR); W 3-2	Grigorios Polychronidis (GRE); L 2-7	Did not advance				

== Cycling ==
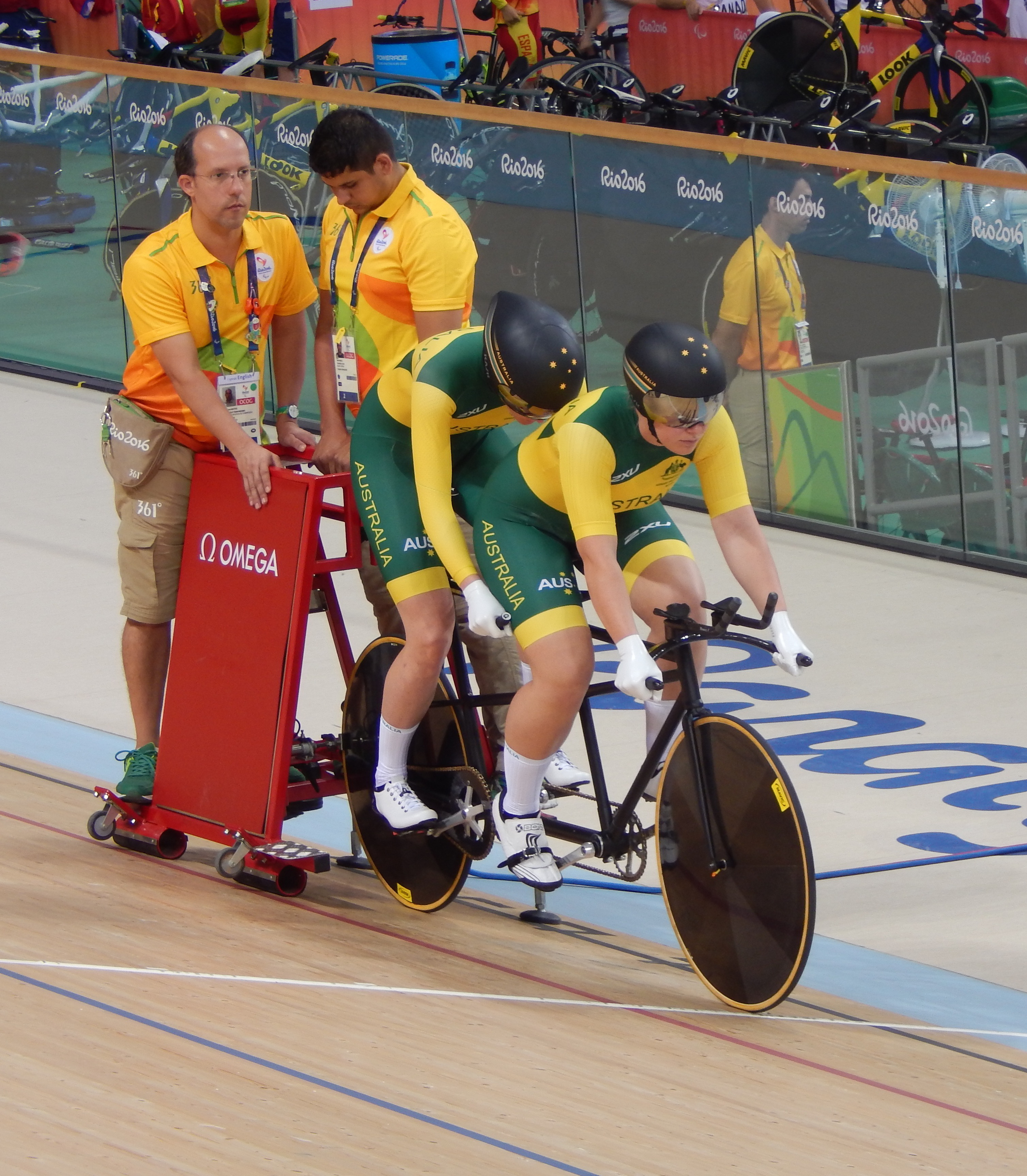
Australian cyclists Madison Janssen (right) and Jessica Gallagher prepare to race in the Women’s B/VI 1000m time trial final, in which they won bronze. This made Gallagher the first Australian to win medals at both the summer and winter Paralympics

The cycling team was announced on 30 May 2016. The team consisted of 13 athletes and three sighted pilots: For Modra, this would be his eighth Paralympic Games. Michael Gallagher was originally selected but on 2 September 2016 he was withdrawn from the team due to a positive doping test sample.

Men	Women
Kieran Modra, David Nicholas, Stuart Tripp, Kyle Bridgwood (d), Alistair Donohoe (d), Matt Formston (d), David Edwards (d) (for pilot Kieran Modra), Nick Yallouris (d) (for pilot Matt Formston)	Jessica Gallagher, Carol Cooke, Simone Kennedy, Alexandra Lisney, Sue Powell, Amanda Reid, Madison Janssen (d) (pilot for Jessica Gallagher)

Track Events — Women

Athlete	Event	Qualification		Final	
Athlete	Event	Time	Rank	Opposition Time	Rank
Jessica Gallagher (Madison Janssen - pilot)	Women's individual pursuit B	3:45.744	9	Did not advance	
Jessica Gallagher (Madison Janssen - pilot)	Women's 1km time trial B	—N/a		1:08.171	3rd place, bronze medalist(s)
Simone Kennedy	Women's individual pursuit C1-3	4:33.815	8	Did not advance	
Simone Kennedy	Women's 500 m time trial C1-3	—N/a		44.961	9
Alexandra Lisney	Women's individual pursuit C4	4:11.087	6	Did not advance	
Alexandra Lisney	Women's 500 m time trial C4-5	—N/a		40.823	12
Susan Powell	Women's individual pursuit C4	4:01.964	2 Q	4:04.794	2nd place, silver medalist(s)
Susan Powell	Women's 500 m time trial C4-5	—N/a		38.979	8
Amanda Reid	Women's 500 m time trial C1-3	—N/a		37.581	2nd place, silver medalist(s)

Track Events — Men

Athlete	Event	Qualification		Final	
Athlete	Event	Time	Rank	Opposition Time	Rank
Kyle Bridgwood	Men's individual pursuit C4	4:38.639	2 Q	2:19.920; Overlapped	2nd place, silver medalist(s)
Alistair Donohoe	Men's individual pursuit C5	4:38.050	2 Q	4:44.520	2nd place, silver medalist(s)
Matt Formston (Nick Yallouris - pilot)	Men's individual pursuit B	4:14.258	5	Did not advance	
Matt Formston (Nick Yallouris - pilot)	Men's 1 km time trial B	—N/a		1:02.546	6
Kieran Modra (David Edwards - pilot)	Men's individual pursuit B	4:14.339	6	Did not advance	
David Nicholas	Men's individual pursuit C3	3:32.336 PR	1 Q	3:33.028	1st place, gold medalist(s)

Track Events — Mixed

Athlete	Event	Qualification		Final	
Athlete	Event	Time	Rank	Opposition Time	Rank
Alistair Donohoe; David Nicholas; Susan Powell; Amanda Reid	Mixed team sprint	55.308	6	Did not advance	

Road Events — Women

Athlete	Event	Time	Rank
Carol Cooke	Women's road time trial T1-2	26:11.40	1st place, gold medalist(s)
Carol Cooke	Women's road race T1-2	1:07:51	1st place, gold medalist(s)
Simone Kennedy	Women's road time trial C1-3	34:31.32	10
Simone Kennedy	Women's road race C1-3	1:30:49	8
Alexandra Lisney	Women's road time trial C4	30:28.39	4
Alexandra Lisney	Women's road race C4-5	2:22:56	7
Susan Powell	Women's road time trial C4	30:19.29	3rd place, bronze medalist(s)
Susan Powell	Women's road race C4-5	2:25:50	9
Amanda Reid	Women's road time trial C1-3	35:55.81	11
Amanda Reid	Women's road race C1-3	1:39:12	11

Road Events — Men

Athlete	Event	Time	Rank
Kyle Bridgwood	Men's road time trial C4	38:23.21	2nd place, silver medalist(s)
Kyle Bridgwood	Men's road race C4-5	2:15:41	6
Alistair Donohoe	Men's road time trial C4	37:33.36	2nd place, silver medalist(s)
Alistair Donohoe	Men's road race C4-5	2:14:03	5
Matt Formston (Nick Yallouris - pilot)	Men's road time trial B	36:55.25	13
Matt Formston (Nick Yallouris - pilot)	Men's road race B	2:41:48	13
Kieran Modra (David Edwards - pilot)	Men's road time trial B	35:09.06	3rd place, bronze medalist(s)
Kieran Modra (David Edwards - pilot)	Men's road race B	2:27:15	5
David Nicholas	Men's road time trial C3	40:15.96	4
David Nicholas	Men's road race C1-3	1:51:48	5
Stuart Tripp	Men's road time trial H5	28:36.81	2nd place, silver medalist(s)
Stuart Tripp	Men's road race H5	1:37:51	7

== Equestrian ==
On 28 June 2014, four riders were selected.
Women - Emma Booth (d), Sharon Jarvis, Lisa Martin (d), Katie Umback (d)

Individual competition

Athlete	Horse	Event	Total	
Athlete	Horse	Event	Score	Rank
Emma Booth	Zidane	Individual championship test grade II	69.914	5
Emma Booth	Zidane	Dressage individual team test grade II	65.765	13
Sharon Jarvis	Maquis	Individual championship test grade III	68.537	9
Sharon Jarvis	Maquis	Dressage individual team test grade III	65.921	15
Lisa Martin	Ceasy	Individual championship test grade IV	72.310	4
Lisa Martin	Ceasy	Dressage individual team test grade IV	71.476	4
Lisa Martin	Ceasy	Individual Freestyle Test - Grade IV	72.250	4
Katie Umback	First Famous	Individual championship test grade III	67.902	12
Katie Umback	First Famous	Dressage individual team test grade III	68.000	8

Team competition

Athlete	Horse	Event	Individual score			Total	
Athlete	Horse	Event	TT	CT	Total	Score	Rank
from Emma Booth	See above	Team	65.765	69.914	135.679	415.367	9
Sharon Jarvis	See above	Team	65.921	68.537	134.458	415.367	9
Lisa Martin	See above	Team	72.310	71.476	143.786	415.367	9
Katie Umback	See above	Team	68.000	67.902	135.902	415.367	9

== Goalball ==
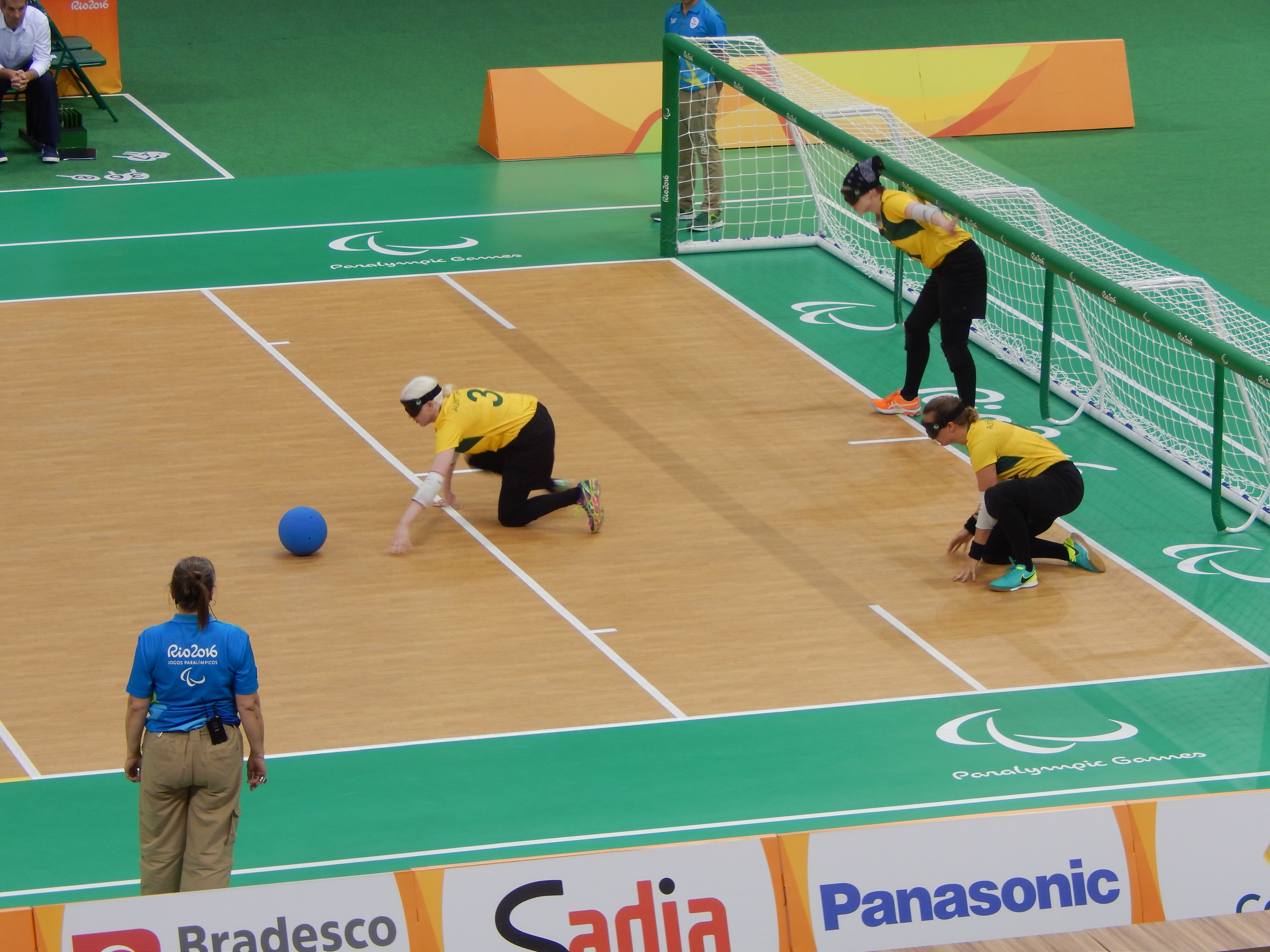
Australia vs Canada at the Future Arena. Left to right: Nicole Esdaile, Meica Horsburgh and Michelle Rzepecki.

The Australian women's team (Belles) originally failed to qualify after finishing third at the IBSA Goalball Asia Pacific Championships in Hangzhou, China. Australian men's team finished fifth at the IBSA Goalball Asia Pacific Championships in Hangzhou, China. Following the re-allocation of Russia's spot, Australia's women found themselves getting a last minute invite to Rio. Australia's women enter the tournament ranked ninth in the world.

The following is the Australia roster in the women's goalball tournament of the 2016 Summer Paralympics.

No.	Player	Class	Date of birth (age)
1	Jennifer Blow	B3	10 April 1991 (aged 25)
2	Tyan Taylor	B3	23 March 1990 (aged 26)
3	Nicole Esdaile	B3	1 June 1987 (aged 29)
6	Michelle Rzepecki	B3	6 November 1986 (aged 29)
7	Raissa Martin	B3	3 March 1991 (aged 25)
8	Meica Horsburgh	B3	24 February 1989 (aged 27)

Pos	Team	Pld	W	D	L	GF	GA	GD	Pts	Qualification
1	Turkey	4	4	0	0	37	11	+26	12	Quarter-finals
2	China	4	3	0	1	21	14	+7	9	Quarter-finals
3	Canada	4	2	0	2	16	22	−6	6	Quarter-finals
4	Ukraine	4	0	1	3	9	17	−8	1	Quarter-finals
5	Australia	4	0	1	3	6	25	−19	1	

Source: Paralympic.org

8 September 2016; 18:45	Australia	2–5	China	Future Arena, Rio de Janeiro; Referees: Vilma Basinkaite (LTU), Yoshinori Nii (JPN)
8 September 2016; 18:45	Horsburgh 1 Esdaile 1	Report	Zhang W. 4 Chen 1	Future Arena, Rio de Janeiro; Referees: Vilma Basinkaite (LTU), Yoshinori Nii (JPN)

10 September 2016; 10:15	Ukraine	2–2	Australia	Future Arena, Rio de Janeiro; Referees: Bülent Kimyon (TUR), Daniel Voltan (BRA)
10 September 2016; 10:15	Rud 2	Report	Horsburgh 1 Esdaile 1	Future Arena, Rio de Janeiro; Referees: Bülent Kimyon (TUR), Daniel Voltan (BRA)

11 September 2016; 18:45	Australia	2–12	Turkey	Future Arena, Rio de Janeiro; Referees: Joelle Boulet (CAN), Raili Sipura (FIN)
11 September 2016; 18:45	Horsburgh 2	Report	Özcan 5 Mercan 5 Yıldız 1 Altunoluk 1	Future Arena, Rio de Janeiro; Referees: Joelle Boulet (CAN), Raili Sipura (FIN)

13 September 2016; 15:30	Canada	6–0	Australia	Future Arena, Rio de Janeiro; Referees: Daniel Voltan (BRA), Raili Sipura (FIN)
13 September 2016; 15:30	Burk 6	Report		Future Arena, Rio de Janeiro; Referees: Daniel Voltan (BRA), Raili Sipura (FIN)

== Paracanoeing ==
On 16 June 2016, six athletes were selected to compete in the new Paralympic Games sport of paracanoe.

Athlete	Event	Heats		Semi-Final		Final	
Athlete	Event	Time	Rank	Time	Rank	Time	Rank
Colin Sieders (d)	Men's KL1	59.732	8	57.176	4 FA	55.437	8
Curtis McGrath (d)	Men's KL2	44.104	1 FA	N/A		42.190 PR	1st place, gold medalist(s)
Dylan Littlehales (d)	Men's KL3	46.305	8	45.258	6	Did not advance	
Jocelyn Neumueller (d)	Women's KL1	1:03.658	4	1:03.666	2 FA	1:03.361	5
Susan Seipel (d)	Women's KL2	58.314	3 FA	N/A		56.796	3rd place, bronze medalist(s)
Amanda Reynolds (d)	Women's KL3	53.412	1 FA	N/A		51.378	2nd place, silver medalist(s)

== Paratriathlon ==
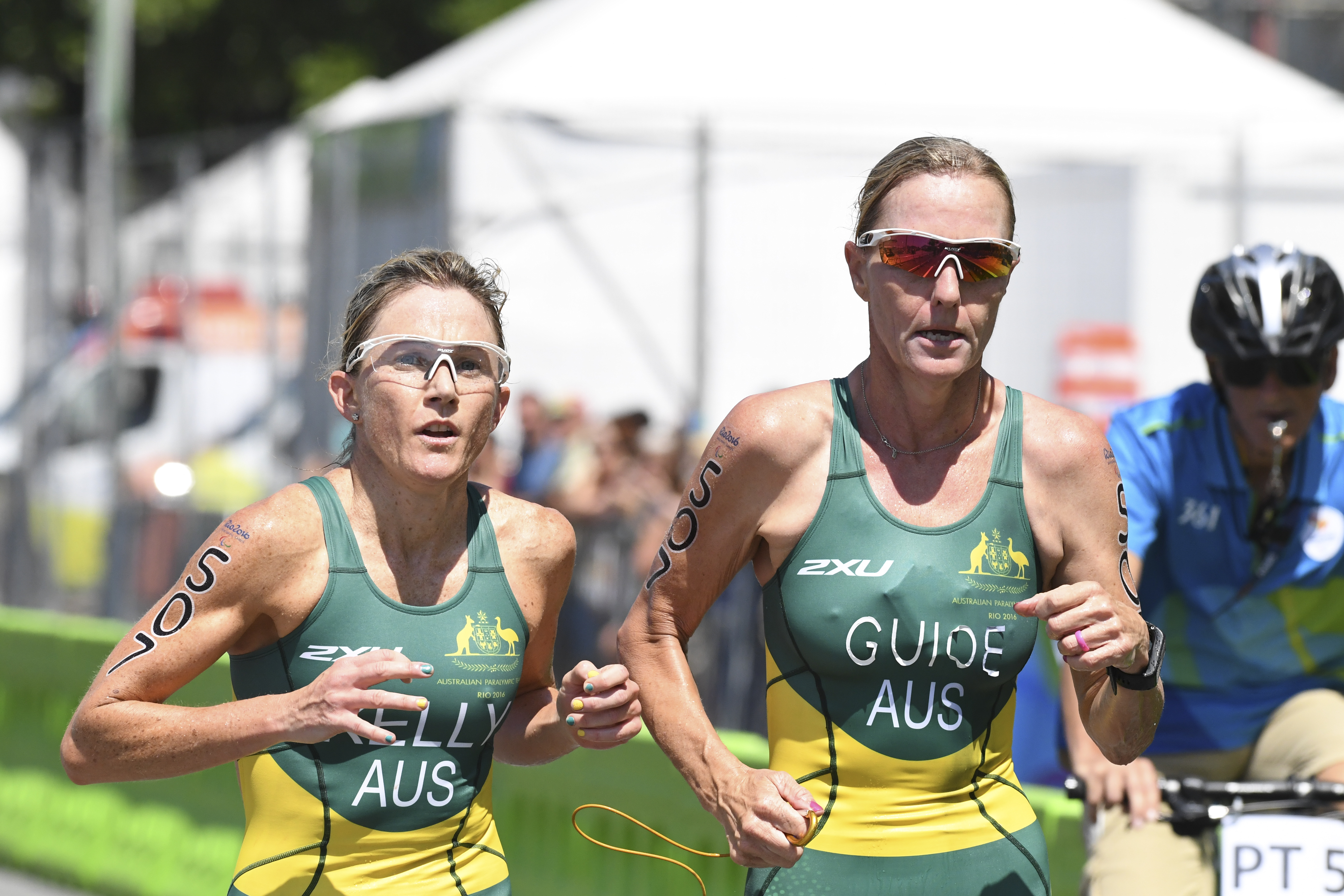
Katie Kelly and her guide Michellie Jones at Copacabana

Australian Paralympic Committee announced a team of seven athletes on 3 August 2016. Paratriathlon makes its debut at the Rio Games.

Men	Women
Nic Beveridge (d), Bill Chaffey (d), Brant Garvey (d)	Kate Doughty (d), Katie Kelly (d), Michellie Jones (guide) for Kelly (d), Claire McLean

(d) Paralympic Games debut

Women's Events

Athlete	Event	Swim	Trans 1	Bike	Trans 2	Run	Total Time	Rank
Kate Doughty	Women's PT4	11:42	1:18	28.09	0:53	23.48	1:15:50	5
Claire McLean	Women's PT4	15:09	1:35	37.12	1:09	24:41	1:19:46	9
Katie Kelly; Michellie Jones (guide)	Women's PT5	16:09	1:24	33:15	0:53	10:37	1:12:18	1st place, gold medalist(s)

Men's Events

Athlete	Event	Swim	Trans 1	Bike	Trans 2	Run	Total Time	Rank
Bill Chaffey	Men's PT1	11:21	1:27	37.17	0.48	12.08	1:03:01	4
Nic Beveridge	Men's PT1	11:57	1:43	42:55	1:00	13:00	1:10:35	9
Brant Garvey	Men's PT2	10:45	1:36	40:40	1:56	24:24	1:19:21	10

== Rowing ==
On 11 July 2016, Australian Paralympic Committee announced a team of 8 athletes. Australia will have a boat in the Legs, Trunk and Arms Mixed Coxed Four for the first time.

Men	Women
Gavin Bellis, Erik Horrie, Brock Ingram (d), Jeremy McGrath (d)	Josephine Burnand (d) (cox), Davinia Lefroy (d), Kathleen Murdoch (d), Kathryn Ross

(d) Paralympic Games debut

Athlete(s)	Event	Heats		Repechage		Final	
Athlete(s)	Event	Time	Rank	Time	Rank	Time	Rank
Erik Horrie	Men's single sculls	4:45.87	1 Q	Bye		4:42.94	2nd place, silver medalist(s)
Gavin Bellis; Kathryn Ross	Mixed double sculls	4:03.25	4	4:08.57	3 FB	4:05.61	2
Brock Ingram; Jeremy McGrath; Davinia Lefroy; Kathleen Murdoch; Jo Burnand (cox)	Mixed coxed four	3:32.88		3:37.29	3 FB	3:30.59	1

Qualification Legend: FA=Final A (medal); FB=Final B (non-medal); R=Repechage

== Sailing ==
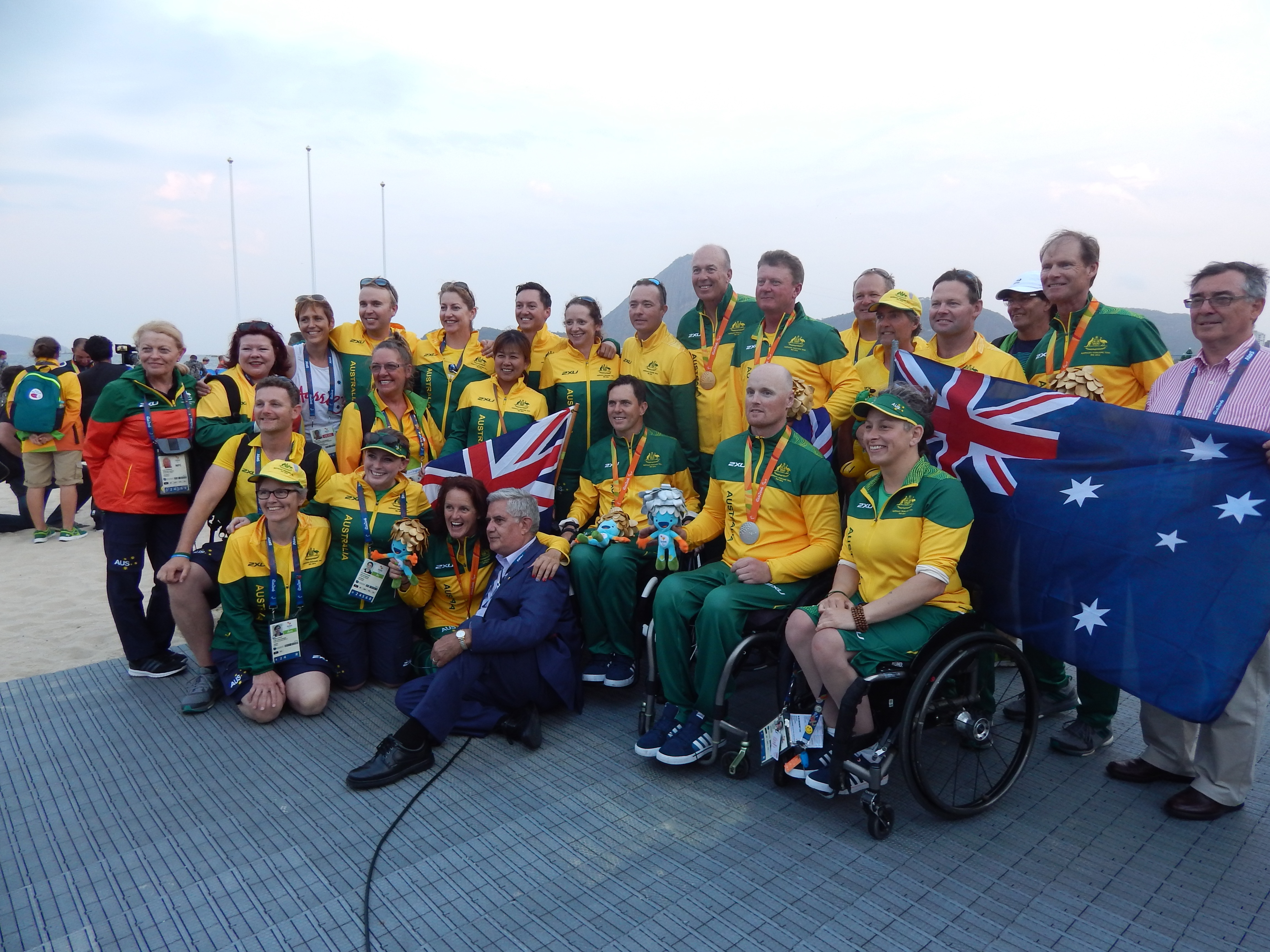
Australian Sailing Team at Rio Paralympics

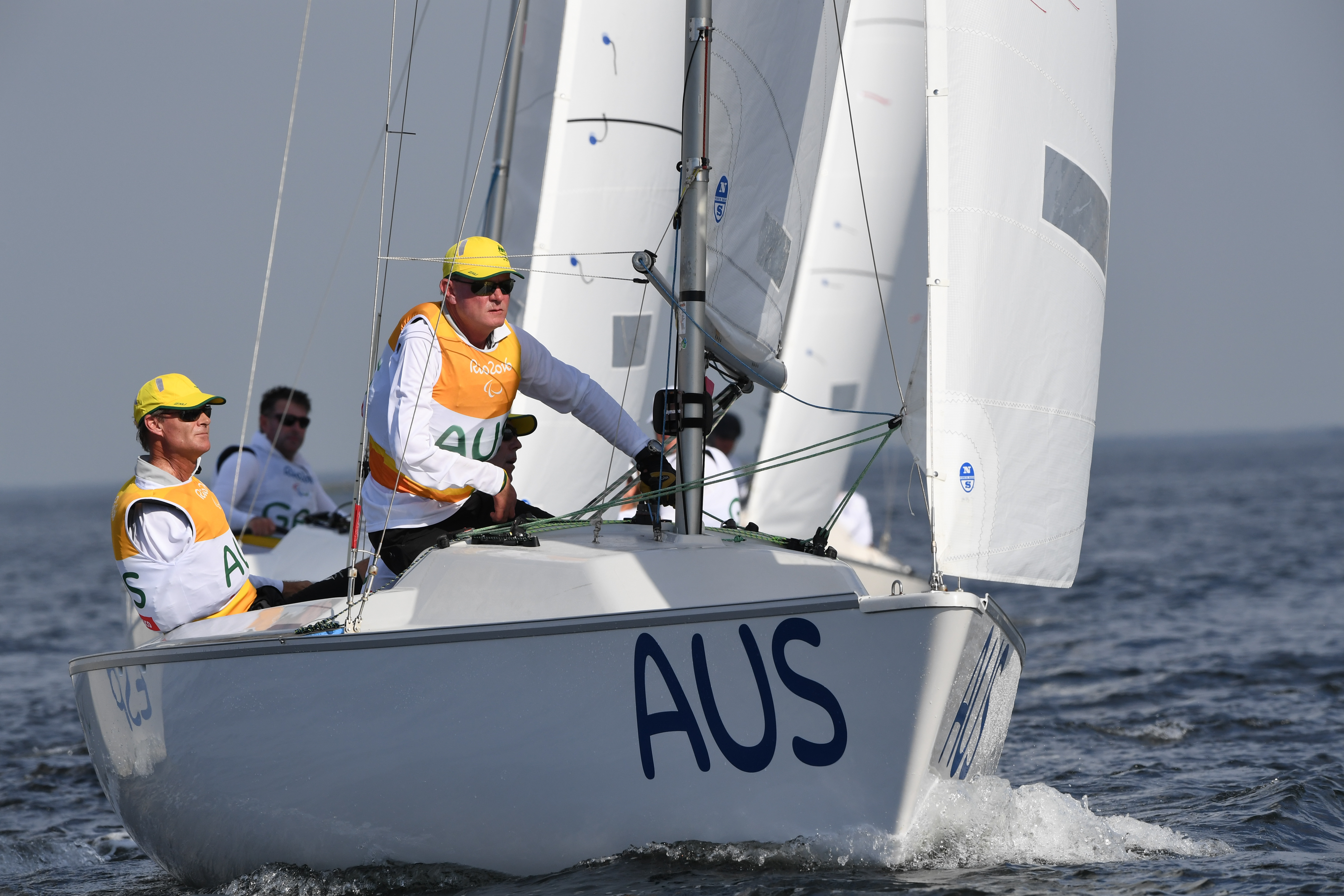
Colin Harrison, Russell Boaden and Jonathan Harris sailing in the Sonar class

Selected team of 6 athletes - Matthew Bugg (Single person 2.4mR), Daniel Fitzgibbon and Liesl Tesch (Two person Skud 18), Colin Harrison, Russell Boaden, Jonathan Harris (Three person Sonar). This will be the last Games for sailing has been taken off the 2020 Tokyo Games program.

Athlete	Event	Race											Net points	Rank
Athlete	Event	1	2	3	4	5	6	7	8	9	10	11	Net points	Rank
Matthew Bugg	Single person 2.4mR	3	5	3	1	5	2	1	1	14	~~17~~	1	36	2nd place, silver medalist(s)
Daniel Fitzgibbon, Liesl Tesch	SKUD 18 – 2 person keelboat	1	~~2~~	1	1	2	1	1	1	1	1	2	12	1st place, gold medalist(s)
Colin Harrison, Russell Boaden, Jonathan Harris	Sonar – 3 person keelboat	1	2	5	7	2	2	1	3	2	1	~~10~~	26	1st place, gold medalist(s)

== Shooting ==
Shooting Australia nominated six athletes in May 2016. Libby Kosmala was selected for her twelfth Games. The team was missing Paralympian Ashley Adams who was killed in 2015 accident.

Men	Women
Luke Cain, Bradley Mark, Chris Pitt (d), Anton Zappelli (d)	Libby Kosmala, Natalie Smith

(d) Paralympic Games debut

Athlete	Event	Qualification		Final	
Athlete	Event	Score	Rank	Score	Rank
Luke Cain	Mixed 10 m air rifle standing SH2	619.9	26	Did not advance	
Luke Cain	Mixed 10 m air rifle prone SH2	623.0	33	Did not advance	
Libby Kosmala	Women's 10 m air rifle standing SH1	396.0	18	Did not advance	
Libby Kosmala	Mixed R3-10 m air rifle prone SH1	622.0	37	Did not advance	
Bradley Mark	Mixed 10 m air rifle standing SH2	627.2	12	Did not advance	
Bradley Mark	Mixed 10 m air rifle prone SH2	627.3	9	Did not advance	
Christopher Pitt	Men's 10 metre air pistol SH1	557-12x	14	Did not advance	
Christopher Pitt	Mixed 25 metre pistol SH1	566-15x	7	8 pts - 4	3pts - 4
Natalie Smith	Women's 10 m air rifle standing SH1	406.1	7 Q	142.5	5
Natalie Smith	Mixed R3-10 m air rifle prone SH1	626.4	31	Did not advance	
Natalie Smith	Women's 50 metre rifle 3 positions SH1	558-10x	8 Q	389.5	8
Natalie Smith	Mixed 50 metre rifle prone SH1	608.8	24	Did not advance	
Anton Zappelli	Mixed 10 metre air rifle prone SH1	629.9	18	Did not advance	
Anton Zappelli	Mixed 50 metre rifle prone SH1	598.3	36	Did not advance	

Australia did not win any medals. Australia's best placing was Christopher Pitt's fourth.

== Swimming ==
36 athletes were selected on 1 August 2016. Three athletes were selected for their fourth Games - Matthew Levy, Jeremy McClure and Rick Pendleton 22 athletes were selected for their debut Paralympics with two 14-year-olds Tiffany Thomas-Kane and Katja Dedekind being selected.

Men	Women
Joshua Alford (d), Michael Anderson, Jesse Aungles (d), Liam Bekric (d), Blake Cochrane, Rowan Crothers (d), Timothy Disken (d), Daniel Fox, Matthew Haanappel, Brenden Hall, Guy Harrison-Murray (d), Timothy Hodge (d), Braedan Jason (d), Ahmed Kelly, Matthew Levy, Jeremy McClure, Rick Pendleton, Logan Powell (d), Sean Russo, Liam Schulter (d), Jacob Templeton (d)	Emily Beecroft (d), Ellie Cole, Katja Dedekind (d), Maddison Elliott, Tanya Huebner (d), Jenna Jones (d), Paige Leonhardt (d), Ashleigh McConnell (d), Monique Murphy (d), Lakeisha Patterson (d), Madeleine Scott (d), Tiffany Thomas Kane (d), Rachael Watson (d), Prue Watt, Kate Wilson (d)

Australian won 29 medals including 10 gold. Maddison Elliott won three gold and Lakeisha Patterson and Ellie Cole won two gold.
(d) Paralympic Games debut

=== Men's events ===
Athlete	Events	Heats		Final	
Athlete	Events	Time	Rank	Time	Rank
Joshua Alford	200 m freestyle S14	2:01.36	9	Did not advance	
Joshua Alford	100 m backstroke S14	1:06.69	8 Q	1:07.77	8
Joshua Alford	200 m individual medley SM14	2:22.99	16	Did not advance	
Michael Anderson	50 m freestyle S10	26.31	15	Did not advance	
Michael Anderson	100 m freestyle S10	57.45	15	Did not advance	
Michael Anderson	100 m backstroke S10	1:01.02	4 Q	1:01.37	6
Jesse Aungles	400 m freestyle S8	4:43.87	8 Q	4:48.23	8
Jesse Aungles	100 m butterfly S8	1:05.37	7 Q	1:06.60	7
Jesse Aungles	100 m backstroke S8	1:10.39	7 Q	1:09.47	7
Jesse Aungles	200 m individual medley SM7	2:31.62	5 Q	2:28.96	6
Liam Bekric	400 m freestyle S13	4:43.32	12	Did not advance	
Liam Bekric	100 m breaststroke SB13	1:09.17	4 Q	1:08.70	4
Liam Bekric	100 m backstroke S13	1:07.47	9	Did not advance	
Liam Bekric	200 m individual medley SM13	2:24.11	14	Did not advance	
Blake Cochrane	50 m freestyle S8	28.19	10	Did not advance	
Blake Cochrane	100 m freestyle S8	1:02.12	10	Did not advance	
Blake Cochrane	400 m freestyle S8	4:41.06	4 Q	4:39.79	7
Blake Cochrane	100 m breaststroke SB7	1:20.08	2 Q	1:18.66	2nd place, silver medalist(s)
Rowan Crothers	50 m freestyle S10	24.49	6 Q	24.09	6
Rowan Crothers	100 m freestyle S10	52.98	4 Q	52.17	5
Rowan Crothers	400 m freestyle S10	4:13.72	8 Q	4:10.83	6
Timothy Disken	50 m freestyle S9	26.08	2 Q	25.99	2nd place, silver medalist(s)
Timothy Disken	100 m freestyle S9	56.73	1 Q	56.23	1st place, gold medalist(s)
Timothy Disken	200 m individual medley SM9	2:18.86	1 Q	2:17.72	3rd place, bronze medalist(s)
Daniel Fox	200 m freestyle S14	1:57.19	1 Q PR	1:56.69	3rd place, bronze medalist(s)
Daniel Fox	100 m backstroke S14	1:03.35	3 Q	1:05.16	6
Daniel Fox	200 m individual medley SM14	2:21.55	12	Did not advance	
Matthew Haanappel	50 m freestyle S6	31.47	6 Q	30.77	5
Matthew Haanappel	100 m freestyle S6	1:09.96	8 Q	1:09.24	6
Matthew Haanappel	400 m freestyle S6	5:36.09	7 Q	5:28.95	6
Matthew Haanappel	100 m backstroke S6	1:23.76	9	Did not advance	
Brenden Hall	50 m freestyle S9	27.05	12	Did not advance	
Brenden Hall	100 m freestyle S9	57.14	2 Q	56.95	2nd place, silver medalist(s)
Brenden Hall	400 m freestyle S9	4:20.46	1 Q	4:12.73	1st place, gold medalist(s)
Brenden Hall	100 m backstroke S9	1:05.56	5 Q	1:04.67	3rd place, bronze medalist(s)
Brenden Hall	100 m butterfly S9	1:02.11	6 Q'	1:01.85	4
Brenden Hall	200 m individual medley SM9	2:21.74	5 Q	DSQ	
Guy Harrison-Murray	50 m freestyle S10	25.08	8 Q	24.47	7
Guy Harrison-Murray	100 m freestyle S10	54.78	9	Did not advance	
Guy Harrison-Murray	400 m freestyle S10	4:11.54	5 Q	4:11.18	8
Timothy Hodge	50 m freestyle S9	27.55	14	Did not advance	
Timothy Hodge	100 m freestyle S9	58.85	14	Did not advance	
Timothy Hodge	400 m freestyle S9	4:29.53	9	Did not advance	
Timothy Hodge	100 m backstroke S9	1:05.99	6 Q	1:05.18	6
Timothy Hodge	100 m butterfly S9	1:05.21	10	Did not advance	
Timothy Hodge	200 m individual medley SM9	2:22.23	6 Q	2:21.14	5
Braedan Jason	50 m freestyle S13	24.75	5 Q	24.61	6
Braedan Jason	100 m freestyle S13	53.90	8 Q	54.04	7
Braedan Jason	400 m freestyle S10	4:15.59	5 Q	4:12.95	5
Braedan Jason	100 m butterfly S13	59.77	7 Q	1:00.12	7
Ahmed Kelly	50 m breaststroke SB3	51.91	5 Q	51.90	7
Ahmed Kelly	50 m backstroke S4	59.55	11	Did not advance	
Ahmed Kelly	150 m individual medley SM4	3:07.81	9	Did not advance	
Matthew Levy	50 m freestyle S7	28.55	1 Q	28.68	4
Matthew Levy	100 m freestyle S7	1:04.90	4 Q	1:02.28	4
Matthew Levy	50 m butterfly S7	31.35	4 Q	31.32	5
Matthew Levy	200 m individual medley SM7	2:46.04	4 Q	2:36.99	3rd place, bronze medalist(s)
Jeremy McClure	50 m freestyle S11	29.61	14	Did not advance	
Jeremy McClure	100 m freestyle S11	1:06.72	12	Did not advance	
Jeremy McClure	100 m backstroke S11	1:09.79	2 Q	1:09.11	5
Rick Pendleton	100 m butterfly S10	1:01.50	10	Did not advance	
Rick Pendleton	100 m breaststroke SB9	1:09.38	6 Q	1:08.27	5
Logan Powell	100 m butterfly S9	1:06.66	13	Did not advance	
Logan Powell	100 m backstroke S9	1:06.37	8 Q	1:06.13	8
Logan Powell	400 m freestyle S9	4:28.94	8 Q	4:27.22	7
Sean Russo	50 m freestyle S13	26.19	15	Did not advance	
Sean Russo	100 m freestyle S13	56.39	16	Did not advance	
Sean Russo	100 m backstroke S13	1:02.19	6 Q	1:01.43	5
Sean Russo	100 m butterfly S13	1:02.18	12	Did not advance	
Sean Russo	100 m breaststroke SB13	1:14.32	8 Q	1:13.85	7
Sean Russo	200 m individual medley SM14	2:16.37	6 Q	2:16.29	6
Liam Schulter	100 m backstroke S14	1:07.64	12	Did not advance	
Liam Schulter	100 m breaststroke SB14	1:16.56	15	Did not advance	
Liam Schulter	200 m freestyle S14	1:58.95	4 Q'	1:59.38	5
Liam Schulter	200 m individual medley SM14	2:18.59	6 Q	2:18.85	7
Jacob Templeton	50 m freestyle S13	25.75	10	Did not advance	
Jacob Templeton	100 m freestyle S13	55.92	13	Did not advance	
Jacob Templeton	400 m freestyle S13	4:19.11	7 Q	4:15.86	6
Jacob Templeton	100 m butterfly S13	1:01.04	11	Did not advance	
Jacob Templeton	200 m individual medley SM13	2:18.72	8 Q	2:20.90	8
Timothy Disken; Matthew Levy; Blake Cochrane; Rowan Crothers	4x100 m freestyle relay 34 pts	N/A		3:51.96	5
Timothy Hodge; Rick Pendleton; Brenden Hall; Matthew Levy	4x100 m medley relay 34 pts	N/A		4:18.08	4

=== Women's events ===
Athlete	Events	Heats		Final	
Athlete	Events	Time	Rank	Time	Rank
Emily Beecroft	50 m freestyle S9	29.61	5 Q	29.33	4
Emily Beecroft	100 m freestyle S9	1:04.90	7 Q	1:05.19	6
Emily Beecroft	100 m butterfly S9	1:10.97	8 Q	1:10.56	6
Emily Beecroft	200 m individual medley SM9	2:45.91	15	Did not advance	
Ellie Cole	50 m freestyle S9	29.26	2 Q	29.13	2nd place, silver medalist(s)
Ellie Cole	100 m freestyle S9	1:03.40	3 Q	1:02.93	3rd place, bronze medalist(s)
Ellie Cole	400 m freestyle S9	4:50.19	1 Q	4:42.58	2nd place, silver medalist(s)
Ellie Cole	100 m backstroke S9	1:11.22	2 Q	1:09.18 PR	1st place, gold medalist(s)
Katja Dedekind	50 m freestyle S13	28.97	11	Did not advance	
Katja Dedekind	100 m freestyle S13	1:04.59	14	Did not advance	
Katja Dedekind	400 m freestyle S13	4:52.23	6 Q	4:50.43	7
Katja Dedekind	100 m backstroke S13	1:14.61	4 Q	1:12.25	3rd place, bronze medalist(s)
Maddison Elliott	50 m freestyle S8	30.83	2 Q	29.73 WR	1st place, gold medalist(s)
Maddison Elliott	100 m freestyle S8	1:07.69	3 Q	1:04.73 PR	1st place, gold medalist(s)
Maddison Elliott	400 m freestyle S8	5:09.85	4 Q	5:02.13	4
Maddison Elliott	100 m backstroke S8	1:20.79	6 Q	1:17.16	2nd place, silver medalist(s)
Maddison Elliott	100 m butterfly S8	1:16.18	4 Q	1:13.80	6
Maddison Elliott	200 m individual medley SM8	2:52.42	4 Q	2:49.67	6
Tanya Huebner	50 m butterfly S6	42.80	9	Did not advance	
Tanya Huebner	100 m breaststroke SB6	1:42.66	4 Q	1:40.54	5
Jenna Jones	50 m freestyle S13	28.57	5 Q	28.77	7
Jenna Jones	100 m freestyle S13	1:02.75	9	Did not advance	
Jenna Jones	100 m backstroke S13	1:15.62	7 Q	1:15.14	7
Jenna Jones	100 m breaststroke SB13	1:22.25	10	Did not advance	
Jenna Jones	200 m individual medley SM13	2:41.55	12	Did not advance	
Paige Leonhardt	50 m freestyle S10	30.00	13	Did not advance	
Paige Leonhardt	100 m freestyle S10	1:07.24	16	Did not advance	
Paige Leonhardt	100 m breaststroke SB9	1:21.67	6 Q	1:20.44	6
Paige Leonhardt	100 m backstroke S10	1:16.11	14	Did not advance	
Paige Leonhardt	100 m butterfly S10	1:11.42	6 Q	1:10.55	6
Paige Leonhardt	200 m individual medley SM10	2:39.57	9	Did not advance	
Ashleigh McConnell	50 m freestyle S9	29.61	5 Q	29.63	7
Ashleigh McConnell	100 m freestyle S9	1:04.78	6 Q	1:05.19	6
Ashleigh McConnell	400 m freestyle S9	5:16.28	15	Did not advance	
Monique Murphy	50 m freestyle S10	29.81	12	Did not advance	
Monique Murphy	100 m freestyle S10	1:04.16	10	Did not advance	
Monique Murphy	400 m freestyle S10	4:46.58	5 Q	4:35.09	2nd place, silver medalist(s)
Monique Murphy	100 m backstroke S10	1:13.62	11	Did not advance	
Lakeisha Patterson	50 m freestyle S8	30.97	4 Q	30.13	2nd place, silver medalist(s)
Lakeisha Patterson	100 m freestyle S8	1:07.45	2 Q	1:05.08	2nd place, silver medalist(s)
Lakeisha Patterson	400 m freestyle S8	4:57.37	2 Q	4:40.33 PR WR	1st place, gold medalist(s)
Lakeisha Patterson	100 m backstroke S8	1:20.32	5 Q	1:18.27	4
Lakeisha Patterson	100 m butterfly S8	1:19.96	8 Q	1:18.99	8
Lakeisha Patterson	200 m individual medley SM8	2:50.16	3 Q	2:45.22	3rd place, bronze medalist(s)
Madeleine Scott	100 m butterfly S9	1:10.96	7 Q	1:10.85	7
Madeleine Scott	100 m breaststroke SB9	1:19.51	3 Q	1:17.93	4
Madeleine Scott	200 m individual medley SM9	2:38.04	4 Q	2:37.65	6
Tiffany Thomas Kane	50 m freestyle S6	35.27	4 Q	34.41	3rd place, bronze medalist(s)
Tiffany Thomas Kane	100 m freestyle S6	1:17.75	5 Q	1:17.56	6
Tiffany Thomas Kane	100 m breaststroke SB6	1:35.43 PR	1 Q	1:35.39	1st place, gold medalist(s)
Tiffany Thomas Kane	100 m backstroke S6	1:31.58	4 Q	DSQ	-
Tiffany Thomas Kane	50 m butterfly S6	37.81	3 Q	36.81	3rd place, bronze medalist(s)
Tiffany Thomas Kane	200 m individual medley SM6	3:10.48	4 Q	3:09.78	3rd place, bronze medalist(s)
Rachael Watson	50 m freestyle S4	40.69	2 Q	40.13 PR	1st place, gold medalist(s)
Rachael Watson	50 m breaststroke SB3	1:08.19	7	Did not advance	
Rachael Watson	150 m individual medley SM4	3:38.66	12	Did not advance	
Prue Watt	50 m freestyle S13	28.95	10	Did not advance	
Prue Watt	100 m freestyle S13	1:04.29	13	Did not advance	
Prue Watt	100 m butterfly S13	1:09.80	1:09.80	Did not advance	
Prue Watt	100 m breaststroke SB13	1:20.44	5 Q	1:18.16	6
Prue Watt	200 m individual medley SM13	2:40.48	8 Q	2:39.06	8
Kate Wilson	50 m freestyle S6	39.81	18	Did not advance	
Kate Wilson	100 m freestyle S6	1:27.02	14	Did not advance	
Kate Wilson	100 m breaststroke SB6	1:49.21	8 Q	1:46.87	8
Kate Wilson	200 m individual medley SM6	3:29.20	12	Did not advance	
Ellie Cole; Maddison Elliott; Lakeisha Patterson; Ashleigh McConnell	4x100 m freestyle relay 34 points			4:16.65 WR	1st place, gold medalist(s)
Ellie Cole; Madeleine Scott; Maddison Elliott; Lakeisha Patterson	4x100 m medley relay 34 points			4:45.85	2nd place, silver medalist(s)

=== Mixed events ===
Athlete	Events	Heats		Final	
Athlete	Events	Time	Rank	Time	Rank
Rachael Watson; Tiffany Thomas Kane; Ahmed Kelly; Matthew Haanappel	Mixed 4 x 50 metre freestyle 20 points	2:46.43	7 Q	2:39.92	7

Legend: Q= Qualified for final; OC= Oceania Record; PR= Paralympic Record; WR= World Record

== Table tennis ==
Five athletes were selected to represent Australia. Daniela Di Toro previously represented Australia in wheelchair tennis and Melissa Tapper was set to become the first Australian to compete at both the Summer Paralympics and Summer Olympics in the same year.

Men	Women
Barak Mizrachi (d), Samuel Von Einem (d)	Daniela Di Toro, Melissa Tapper, Andrea McDonnell (d)

Samuel Von Einem in winning the silver medal won Australia's first medal since Terry Biggs won gold in 1984.

(d)= Paralympic Games debut

Men's tournament

Athlete	Event	Preliminaries			Quarterfinals	Semifinals	Gold medal match	
Athlete	Event	Opposition Result	Opposition Result	Opposition Result	Opposition Result	Opposition Result	Opposition Result	Rank
Barak Mizrachi	Singles class 8	Chaoqun Ye (CHN); L 0-3 (2-11, 2-11, 4-11)	Piotr Grudzien (POL); L 0-3 (10-12, 5-11, 6-11)	Did not advance				
Samuel Von Einem	Singles class 11	—N/a		Lucas Creange (FRA); W 3–1 (14-12, 6-11, 11-7, 11-9)	Byeong-Jun Son (KOR); W 3–2 (12-14, 1-11, 11-2, 11-9, 11-9)	Gi-Tae Kim (KOR); W 3–2 (8-11, 11-8, 11-6, 7-11, 11-8)	Florian Van Acker (BEL); L 2-3 (8-11, 18-16, 13-11, 5-11, 8-11)	2nd place, silver medalist(s)

Women's tournament

Athlete	Event	Preliminaries			Quarterfinals	Semifinals	Bronze medal match	
Athlete	Event	Opposition Result	Opposition Result	Opposition Result	Opposition Result	Opposition Result	Opposition Result	Rank
Daniela Di Toro	Singles class 4	Nadia Matic (SRB); L0-3 (2-11, 5-11, 5-11)	Sandra Mikolaschek (GER); L0-3 (2-11, 3-11, 3-11)	Did not advance				
Andrea McDonnell	Singles class 10	Bruna Costa Alaxndre (BRA); L 0-3 (3-11, 5-11, 2-11)	Lucic Mirjana (CRO); L 1-3 (8-11, 3-11, 11-4, 7-11)	Qian Yang (CHN); L 1-3 (7-11, 3-11, 2-11)	Did not advance			
Melissa Tapper	Singles class 10	Umran Ertis (TUR); W3–1 (11-2, 11-4, 10-12, 11-9)	Natalia Partyka (POL); L0-3 (6-11, 3-11, 4-11)	Sophie Walloe (DEN); L2-3 (11-5, 11-5, 8-11, 10-12, 8-11)	Did not advance			
Andrea McDonnell; Melissa Tapper	Team class 6–10	—N/a			Kubra Korkut; Umran Ertis (TUR); W 2-0 (3-2, 3-1)	Qian Yang; Guiyan Xiong (CHN); L 0-2 (1-3, 0-3)	Bruna Costa Alexandre; Danielle Rauen (BRA) L 0-2 (2-3, 0-3)	4

== Wheelchair basketball ==
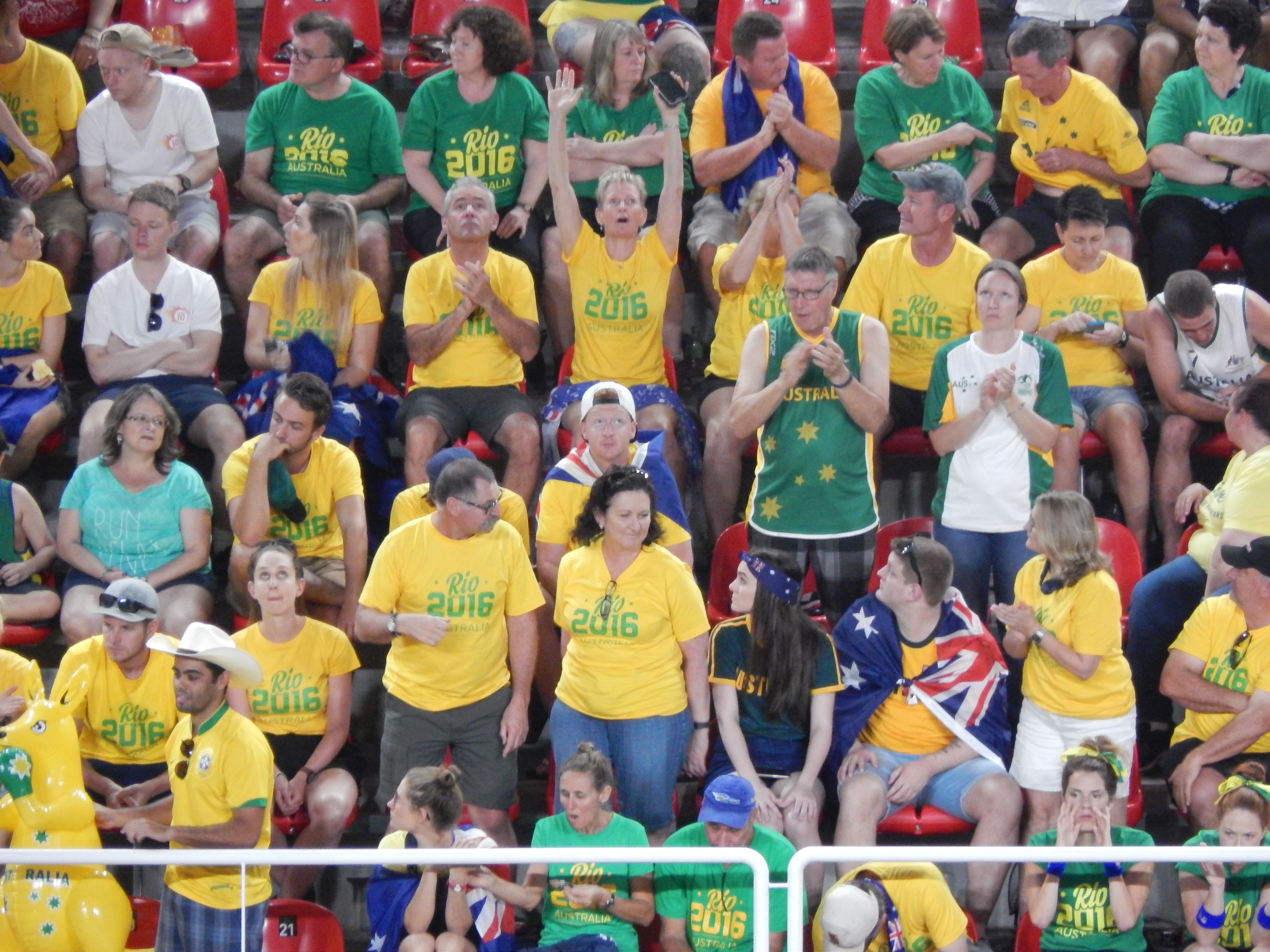
Australian fans watch the wheelchair basketball at the 2016 Rio Paralympics

=== Men's tournament ===
The Rollers qualified by winning the 2015 Asia Oceania Qualifying Tournament. On 19 July 2016, the APC announced a team of twelve players with five of them making their Paralympic debut. During the draw, Brazil had the choice of which group they wanted to be in. They were partnered with Spain, who would be in the group Brazil did not select. Brazil chose Group B, which included Iran, the United States, Great Britain, Germany and Algeria. That left Spain in Group A with Australia, Canada, Turkey, the Netherlands and Japan.

Team roster

Josh Allison (d), Jannik Blair, Adam Deans (d), Tristan Knowles, Bill Latham, Matthew McShane (d), Brad Ness, Shaun Norris, Tom O'Neill-Thorne (d), Shawn Russell (d), Tige Simmons, Brett Stibners
(d) Paralympic Games debut

Group play standings

Pos	Team	Pld	W	L	PF	PA	PD	Pts	Qualification
1	Spain	5	4	1	341	265	+76	9 (Note: Head-to-head record: Spain 3 pts, +8 PD; Turkey 3 pts, +1 PD; Japan 3 pts, −9 PD)	Quarter-finals
2	Turkey	5	4	1	327	272	+55	9	Quarter-finals
3	Australia	5	4	1	342	293	+49	9	Quarter-finals
4	Netherlands	5	2	3	264	294	−30	7	Quarter-finals
5	Japan	5	1	4	278	300	−22	6	9th/10th place playoff
6	Canada	5	0	5	222	350	−128	5	11th/12th place playoff

Source: Paralympic.org
Rules for classification: 1) Points; 2) Head-to-head results; 3) Points difference; 4) Points scored.
Notes:

8 September 2016
18:00

Report

Netherlands	50–70	Australia
Scoring by quarter: 6–16, 19–21, 13–18, 12–15
Pts: Korkmaz 24; Rebs: Poggenwisch 9 Asts: Korkmaz, Poggenwish 8		Pts: Blair 23; Rebs: Knowles 12; Asts: Stibners 7

Rio Olympic Arena, Rio de Janeiro
Referees: Bill Kuerzi

9 September 2016
12:15

Report

Australia	62–60	Turkey
Scoring by quarter: 17–20, 17–13, 12–17, 16–10
Pts: Knowles 17; Rebs: Norris 11; Asts: Knowles 9		Pts: Gürbulak 27; Rebs: Gürbulak 13; Asts: Gürbulak 12

Carioca Arena 1, Rio de Janeiro
Referees: Carsten Rehling

10 September 2016
15:15

Report

Canada	53–78	Australia
Scoring by quarter: 16–21, 12–15, 16–22, 9–20
Pts: Eng 17; Rebs: Goncin, Eng 6 Asts: Goncin 5		Pts: Knowles 23; Rebs: Norris 7 Asts: Knowles 6

Rio Olympic Arena, Rio de Janeiro
Referees: Gustavo Mathias

11 September 2016
08:30

Report

Spain	75–64	Australia
Scoring by quarter: 11–21, 24–12, 16–10, 24–21
Pts: A. Zarzuela, P. Zarzuela 17; Rebs: A. Zarzuela 13; Asts: García 11		Pts: Knowles 28; Rebs: Knowles 11; Asts: Norris 6

Rio Olympic Arena, Rio de Janeiro
Referees: Cristian Roja

12 September 2016
13:30

Report

Australia	68–55	Japan
Scoring by quarter: 14–7, 20–13, 15–10, 19–25
Pts: Ness 12; Rebs: Knowles 7 Asts: Knowles 9		Pts: Kozai 9 Rebs: Fujimoto 6 Asts: Mayajima 7

Carioca Arena 1, Rio de Janeiro
Referees: Bil Kuerzi

Quarter finals

14 September 2016
17:30

Report

Great Britain	74–51	Australia
Scoring by quarter: 11–15, 18–16, 23–14, 22–6
Pts: Sagar 26; Rebs: Sagar, Pratt 10; Asts: Choudhry 10		Pts: Norris 14; Rebs: Knowles 7 Asts: Norris 8

Rio Olympic Arena, Rio de Janeiro
Referees: Cristian Roja

5th - 6th Classification

17 September 2016
15:15

Report

Australia	69–70	Brazil
Scoring by quarter: 20–17, 19–20, 13–17, 17–16
Pts: Knowles 15; Rebs: Norris 5 Asts: Norris 5		Pts: De Miranda 24; Rebs: De Miranda 15; Asts: Candido Sanchez 16

Rio Olympic Arena, Rio de Janeiro
Referees: Max Kindervater

=== Women's tournament ===
The Gliders did not qualify after finishing second to China at the 2015 Asia Oceania Qualifying Tournament.

== Wheelchair rugby ==
Australia won the 2014 World Wheelchair Rugby Championships, thereby automatically qualifying to defend the Paralympic title they won in London. On 25 July 2016, the APC announced a team of 12 players. Australia entered the tournament ranked number two in the world.

Men
Ryley Batt, Chris Bond, Cameron Carr, Andrew Edmondson (d), Nazim Erdem, Ben Fawcett (d), Andrew Harrison, Josh Hose, Jason Lees, Matt Lewis (d), Ryan Scott, Jayden Warn (d)

(d) Paralympic Games debut

Pos	Team	Pld	W	D	L	GF	GA	GD	Pts	Qualification
1	Australia	3	3	0	0	188	158	+30	6	Semi-finals
2	Canada	3	2	0	1	174	160	+14	4	Semi-finals
3	Great Britain	3	1	0	2	152	135	+17	2	Fifth place Match
4	Brazil (H)	3	0	0	3	125	186	−61	0	Seventh place Match

Source: Rio2016
(H) Hosts
14 September 2016
10:30

Australia	53–51	Great Britain
	Report

Carioca Arena 1, Rio de Janeiro
Referee: Pierre-Alexandre Briere, Alexander Shriener

15 September 2016
19:15

Australia	72–45	Brazil
	Report

Carioca Arena 1, Rio de Janeiro
Referee: Darren Roberts, Jean Choiniere

16 September 2016
19:15

Canada	62–63	Australia
	Report

Carioca Arena 1, Rio de Janeiro
Referee: Darren Roberts, Brian Ward

Semi-finals

17 September 2016
16:00

Australia	63–57	Japan
	Report

Carioca Arena 1, Rio de Janeiro
Referee: Jean Choiniere, Mitch Carr

Gold medal match

18 September 2016
12:30

(gold) Australia	59–58	(silver) United States
	Report

Carioca Arena 1, Rio de Janeiro
Referee: Pierre-Alexandre Briere, Alexander Schreiner

== Wheelchair tennis ==
Selected team of 4 athletes on 28 July 2016. Sarah Calati was added to the team as a result of Russia's selection. Ben Weekes was competing at his fourth Games and wheelchair basketball gold medallist Dylan Alcott was competing in wheelchair tennis for the first time. Sarah Calati was a late inclusion due to the banning of the Russian team.

Men	Women
Dylan Alcott, Heath Davidson (d), Ben Weekes, Adam Kellerman	Sarah Calati (d)

Men's tournament

Athlete (seed)	Event	Round of 64	Round of 32	Round of 16	Quarterfinals	Semifinals	Final / BM	
Athlete (seed)	Event	Opposition Score	Opposition Score	Opposition Score	Opposition Score	Opposition Score	Opposition Score	Rank
Dylan Alcott	Men's singles	N/A	N/a	Sharga Weinberg (ISR); W 2-0 (6-0, 6-0)	Nick Taylor (USA); W 2-0 (6-2, 6-0)	Lucas Sithole (RSA); W 2-0 (6-0, 6-3)	Andy Lapthorne (GBR); W 2-0 (6-3, 6-4)	1st place, gold medalist(s)
Heath Davidson	Men's singles	N/A	N/A	Bryan Barten (USA); W 2-1 (2-6, 7-5, 6-1)	Andy Lapthorne (GBR); L '0-2 (1-6, 2-6)	Did not advance		
Adam Kellerman	Men's singles	Bye	Satoshi Saida (JPN); W 2-0 (7-5, 6-1)	Gustavo Fernandez (ARG); L 0-2 (1-6, 2-6)	Did not advance			
Ben Weekes	Men's singles	Francesc Tur (ESP); W 2-0 (7-5, 6-3)	Stefan Olsson (SWE); L 0-2 (0-6, 3-6)	Did not advance				
Adam Kellerman; Ben Weekes	Men's doubles			Kamil Fabisiak; Tadeusz Kruszelnicki (POL); L 1-2 (5-7, 6-3, 3-6)	Did not advance			
Dylan Alcott; Heath Davidson	Men's quad doubles				Shota Tkawano; Mitsuteru Moroishi (JPN); W 2-0 (6-1, 6-4)	Jamie Burdekin; Andy Lapthorne (GBR); W 2-0 (6-1, 6-2)	Nick Taylor; David Wagner (USA); W 2-1 (4-6, 6-4, 7-5)	1st place, gold medalist(s)

Women's tournament

Athlete (seed)	Event	Round of 64	Round of 32	Round of 16	Quarterfinals	Semifinals	Final / BM	
Athlete (seed)	Event	Opposition Score	Opposition Score	Opposition Score	Opposition Score	Opposition Score	Opposition Score	Rank
Sarah Calati	Women's singles	Zhu Zhenzhen (CHN); L 0-2 (0-6, 1-6)	Did not advance					

(d)= Paralympic Games debut

== Broadcasting ==
The Australian Paralympic Committee sold the rights to the Seven Network. Previously the Australian Broadcasting Corporation broadcast the Games. There were 20 per cent more hours broadcast than the London Paralympics.

Major advertisers and sponsors were: Optus, Samsung, Visa Inc, Swisse, Woolworths and Toyota.

== See also ==
- Australia at the 2016 Summer Olympics
- Australia at the Paralympics
- Australian Paralympic Archery team
- Australian Paralympic Athletics Team
- Australian Paralympic Boccia Team
- Australian Paralympic Cycling Team
- Australian Paralympic Equestrian Team
- Australian Paralympic Paracanoe Team
- Australian Paralympic Paratriathlon Team
- Australian Paralympic Rowing Team
- Australian Paralympic Sailing Team
- Australian Paralympic Shooting Team
- Australian Paralympic Swim Team
- Australian Paralympic Table Tennis Team
- Australian Paralympic wheelchair tennis team
- Australia men's national wheelchair basketball team
- Australia national wheelchair rugby team
- Australia women's national goalball team
