= Athletics at the 2016 Summer Paralympics – Women's 100 metres T53 =

Women's 100 metres T53 at the XV Paralympic Games
- Venue: Estádio Olímpico João Havelange
- Dates: September 8, 2016
- Competitors: 9 from 7 nations

Medalists
1st place, gold medalist(s)		Lisha Huang	China
2nd place, silver medalist(s)		Hongzhuan Zhou	China
3rd place, bronze medalist(s)		Angela Ballard	Australia

The T53 category is for wheelchair athletes with normal use of arms and hands, no or limited trunk function, and no leg function.

The Athletics at the 2016 Summer Paralympics – Women's 100 metres T53 event at the 2016 Paralympic Games took place on September 8, 2016, at the Estádio Olímpico João Havelange.

== Heats ==
=== Heat 1 ===
12:30 8 September 2016:

Rank	Lane	Bib	Name	Nationality	Reaction	Time	Notes
1	4	162	Lisha Huang	China		16.19	Q
2	5	337	Samantha Kinghorn	Great Britain		17.01	Q
3	7	849	Hamide Kurt	Turkey		17.09	Q
4	6	140	Ilana Dupont	Canada		17.81	q

=== Heat 2 ===
12:37 8 September 2016:

Rank	Lane	Bib	Name	Nationality	Reaction	Time	Notes
1	5	188	Hongzhuan Zhou	China		16.64	Q
2	6	30	Angela Ballard	Australia		16.80	Q
3	4	901	Kelsey Lefevour	United States		17.28	Q
4	3	77	Jessica Cooper Lewis	Bermuda		17.42	q
5	7	846	Zeynep Acet	Turkey		19.26	

== Final ==
18:54 8 September 2016:

Rank	Lane	Bib	Name	Nationality	Reaction	Time	Notes
1st place, gold medalist(s)	3	162	Lisha Huang	China		16.28	
2nd place, silver medalist(s)	6	188	Hongzhuan Zhou	China		16.51	
3rd place, bronze medalist(s)	4	30	Angela Ballard	Australia		16.59	
4	8	849	Hamide Kurt	Turkey		17.01	
5	5	337	Samantha Kinghorn	Great Britain		17.13	
6	1	77	Jessica Cooper Lewis	Bermuda		17.25	
7	7	901	Kelsey Lefevour	United States		17.31	
8	2	140	Ilana Dupont	Canada		17.82	
