= Cycling at the 2016 Summer Paralympics – Women's 500 m time trial C1–3 =

Cycling, Women's 500 m Time Trial C1-3 at the XV Paralympic Games
- Venue: Rio Olympic Velodrome
- Dates: September 11, 2016
- Competitors: 11 from 8 nations

Medalists
1st place, gold medalist(s)		Alyda Norbruis	Netherlands
2nd place, silver medalist(s)		Amanda Reid	Australia
3rd place, bronze medalist(s)		Zhenling Song	China

The Women's 500 metre Time Trial C1-3 track cycling event at the 2016 Summer Paralympics took place on September 11. eleven riders competed.

== Results ==
Rank	Athlete	Nation	Classification	Time	Factor	Final time
1st place, gold medalist(s)	Alyda Norbruis	Netherlands	C2	39.631	93.13	36.908
2nd place, silver medalist(s)	Amanda Reid	Australia	C2	40.354	93.13	37.581
3rd place, bronze medalist(s)	Zhenling Song	China	C2	42.973	93.13	40.020
4	Sini Zeng	China	C2	44.147	93.13	41.114
5	Megan Giglia	Great Britain	C3	41.252	100	41.252
6	Allison Jones	United States	C2	45.315	93.13	42.201
7	Daniela Munevar	Colombia	C2	46.458	93.13	43.266
8	Jamie Whitmore	United States	C3	43.961	100	43.961
9	Simone Kennedy	Australia	C3	44.961	100	44.961
10	Roxanne Burns	South Africa	C3	45.071	100	45.071
11	Tereza Diepoldova	Czech Republic	C2	50.014	93.13	46.578
	Jieli Li	China	C1	DNS	-	-
