= Cycling at the 2016 Summer Paralympics – Women's individual pursuit C4 =

Women's individual pursuit C4 at the XV Paralympic Games
- Dates: 8 September
- Competitors: 8 from 6 nations

Medalists
1st place, gold medalist(s)		Shawn Morelli	United States
2nd place, silver medalist(s)		Susan Powell	Australia
3rd place, bronze medalist(s)		Megan Fisher	United States

The women's individual pursuit C4 took place on 8 September 2016.

The event began with a qualifying race over 3000m. Each of the eight athletes competed individually in a time trial basis. The fastest two riders raced for the gold medal and the third and fourth fastest riders raced for the bronze.

== Preliminaries ==
Q: Qualifier
WR: World Record
PR: Paralympic Record

Rank	Name	Country	Time
1	Shawn Morelli	United States	3:57.741 Q PR
2	Susan Powell	Australia	4:01.964 Q
3	Kate Horan	New Zealand	4:02.608 Q
4	Megan Fisher	United States	4:03.433 Q
5	Marie-Claude Molnar	Canada	4:08.452
6	Alexandra Lisney	Australia	4:11.087
7	Jianping Ruan	China	4:11.283
8	Jenny Narcisi	Italy	4:19.968

== Finals ==
Gold medal match

Name	Time	Rank
Shawn Morelli (USA)	3:59.407	1st place, gold medalist(s)
Susan Powell (AUS)	4:04.794	2nd place, silver medalist(s)

Bronze medal match

Name	Time	Rank
Megan Disher (USA)	4:04.081	3rd place, bronze medalist(s)
Kate Horan (NZL)	4:04.437	4
