= Jessee Wyatt =

Australian Paralympic athlete

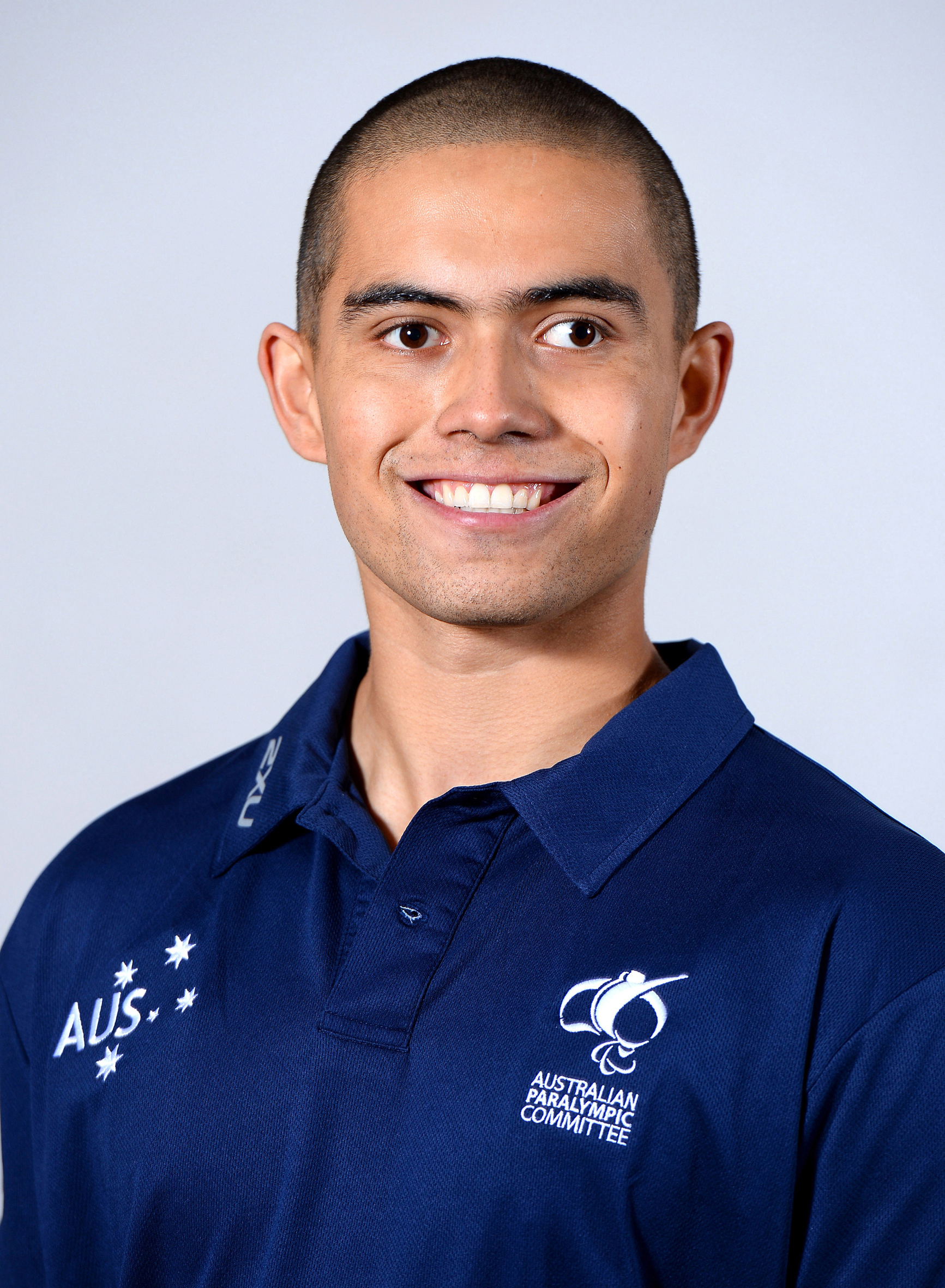

Personal information
- Full name: Jessee Wyatt
- Nationality: Australia
- Born: 14 April 1996 (age 30) New Zealand

Sport
- Club: Frankston Athletics Club:

Jessee Wyatt (born 14 April 1996) is an Australian Paralympic athlete with cerebral palsy. He represented Australia at the 2016 Rio Paralympics & also the 2024 Olympics.

== Personal ==
Wyatt was born in New Zealand on 14 April 1996. He has cerebral palsy and has undergone surgery to assist his mobility.

== Career ==
Wyatt took up athletics in 2012 and is coached by Australian Paralympian John Eden. At the 2015 IPC Athletics World Championships in Doha, he finished fifth in the Men's Shot Put F33 with a throw of 8.69m.

At the 2016 Rio Paralympics, he finished fourth on the Men's Shot Put F33 with a throw of 8.71.

At the 2017 World Para Athletics Championships in London, England, Wyatt finished sixth in the Men's Shot Put F33 with a throw of 8.93m.
