= Katie Umback =

Australian equestrian (born 1973)

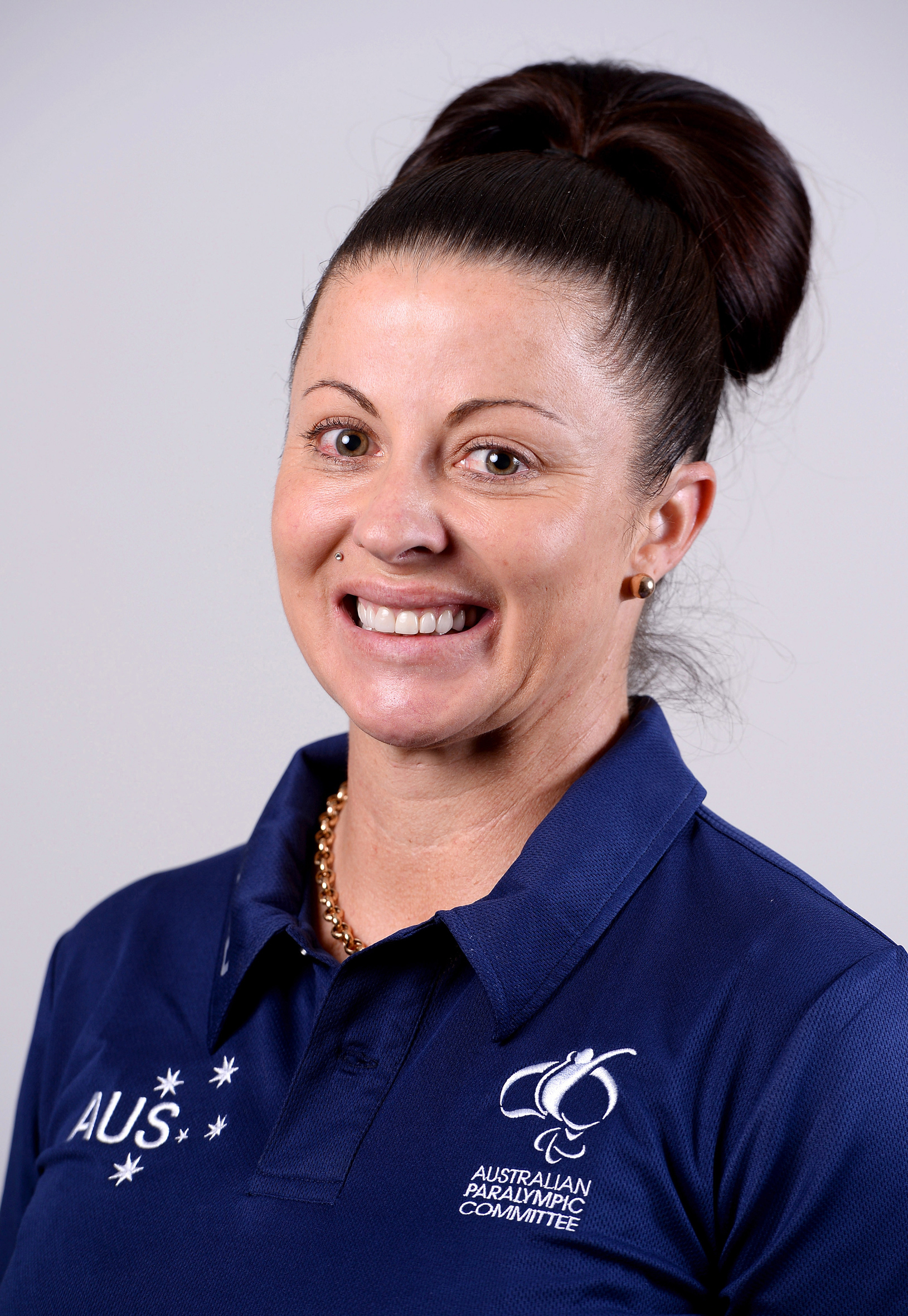
- 2016 Australian Paralympic team portrait

Personal information
- Full name: Katie-Maree Umback
- Born: 20 August 1973 (age 52)

Sport
- Country: Australia
- Sport: Para-equestrian
- Disability class: Grade III

Katie-Maree Umback (born 20 August 1973) is an Australian para-equestrian who represented her country at the 2016 Rio Paralympics.

== Personal ==
Umback was born on 20 August 1973. At the age of 32, she was diagnosed with multiple sclerosis. As a result, she underwent several years of chemotherapy and several rounds of autoimmune medications. She is partially numb in 70 per cent of her body and has diminished arm and leg strength. She lives in Bega, New South Wales.

== Equestrian ==
Umback started with pony clubs at the age of five and moved to dressage at the age of seven. She then moved into eventing but this ceased at the age of 18 after a serious fall on a cross country course which led to her breaking the fifth vertebra in her neck. She then concentrated on dressage. After her treatment for multiple sclerosis, she returned to riding with the goal of competing at the Paralympics. In 2014, as a Grade III rider she competed the CPEDI 3* in Hartpury, England. In the lead up to the 2016 Rio Paralympics, she based herself Holland so that she could compete on the European dressage circuit and undertake Paralympic qualifiers.

In a 2015 interview, Umback said: "I should be totally disabled by now but I never accepted that outcome for my life, I always stayed positive in my thoughts and everything I do and have never given up on myself or my dreams and now I'm living my dreams."

At the 2016 Rio Paralympics, she rode Danish Warmblood gelding, Gronskovlunds Marquis. She finished eighth in the Dressage Individual Team Test Grade III and 12th in the Individual Championship Test Grade III and was a member of the Australian Team that finished ninth in the Team Competition.
