= Matt Lewis (wheelchair rugby) =

Australian wheelchair rugby player (born 1987)

Matt Lewis OAM
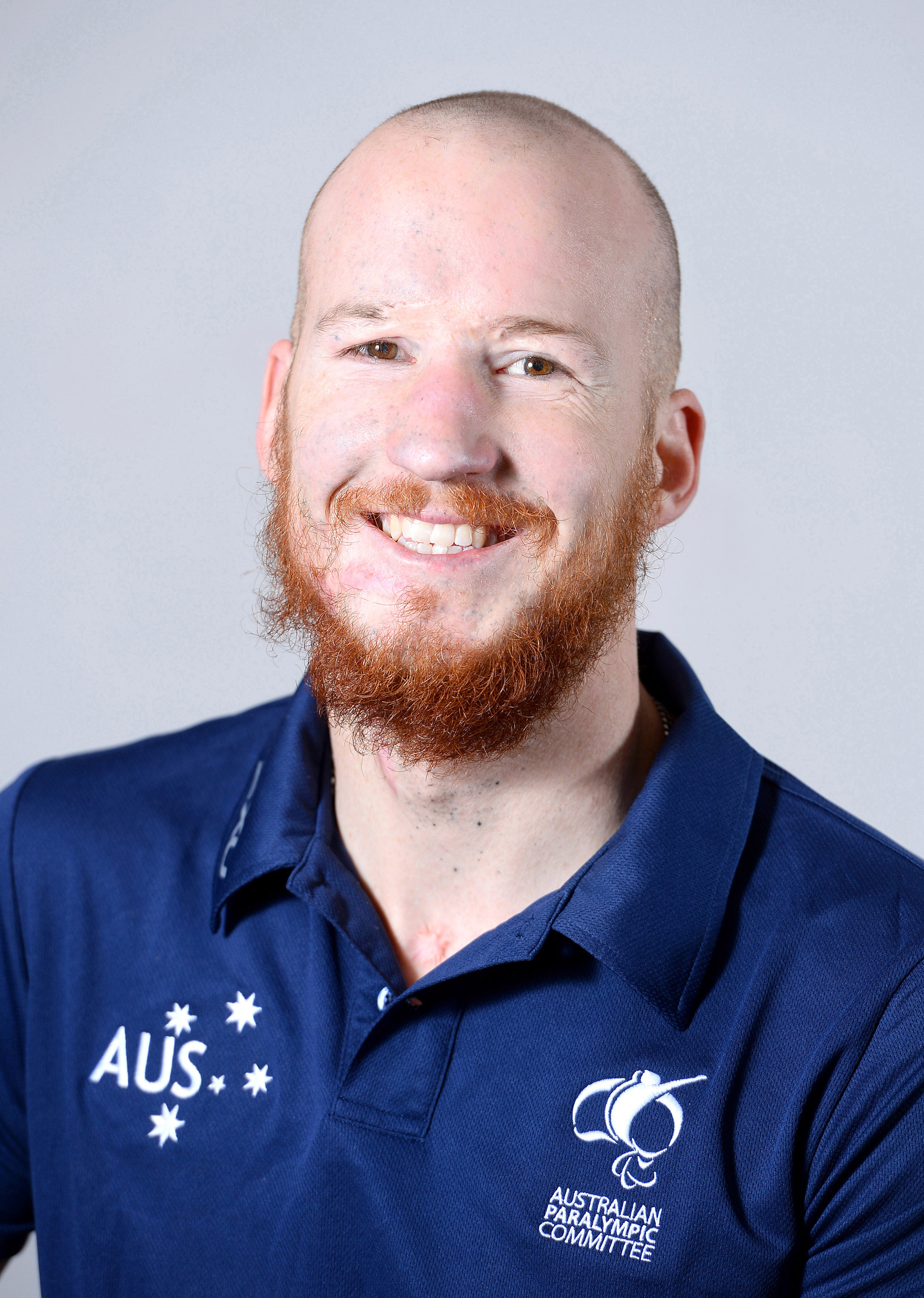
- 2016 Australian Paralympic team portrait of Lewis

Personal information
- Nickname: Bomber
- Nationality: Australian
- Born: 8 January 1987 (age 39)

Sport
- Country: Australia
- Sport: Wheelchair rugby
- Disability class: 3.5
- Club: Victoria Protect Lightning
Medal record
Wheelchair rugby
Paralympic Games
Gold medal – first place	2016 Rio	Mixed

Matt Franklin Lewis (born 8 January 1987) is an Australian wheelchair rugby player. He won a gold medal at the 2016 Rio Paralympics as a member of the Australian Steelers.

== Personal ==
Lewis was born on 8 January 1987. In 2011, at the age of 24, he was severely injured when making a home made bomb using a gas cylinder. The bomb making operation went badly wrong and left him in an induced coma for just over a month. He lost most of his fingers and both his legs had to be amputated above the knees. In addition, his hearing is impaired and he has many scars on his body. In 2016, he was completing an electrical apprenticeship. He assists programs that educate young people about the dangers of risk taking.

== Wheelchair rugby ==
Lewis was introduced to wheelchair rugby by Victorian coach Bryce Alman. In 2013/14, he played for Seattle Storm in the USA national league for five months and won a number of MVP awards. In 2014, he was selected to play for the national team the Australian Steelers. In 2016, he was the MVP at the Wheelchair Rugby National Series.

He was a member of the team that retained its gold medal at the 2016 Rio Paralympics after defeating the United States 59–58 in the final. He was awarded the Order of Australia Medal in 2017.
