= Chris Pitt =

Australian Paralympic shooter

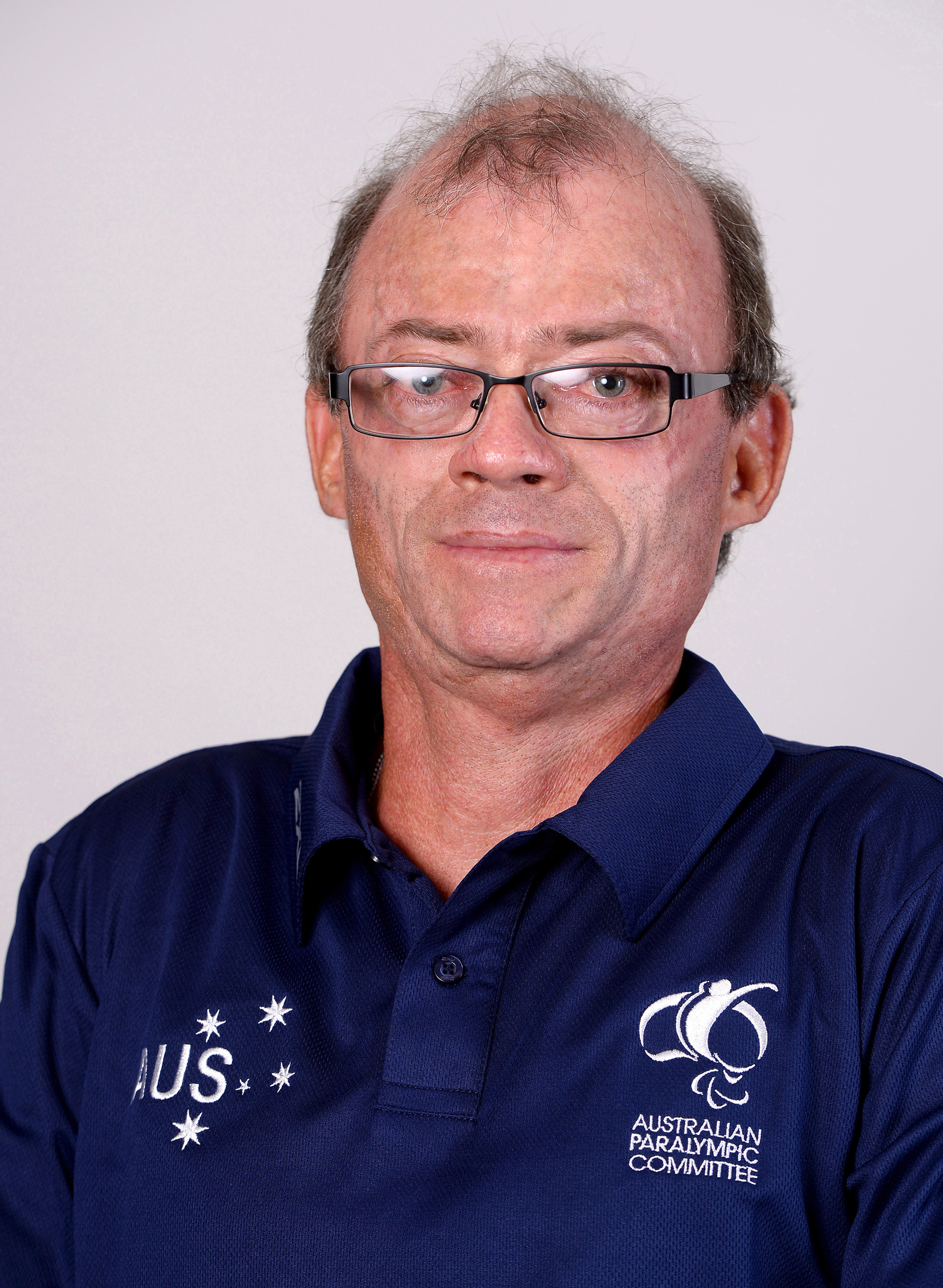
- 2016 Australian Paralympic team portrait

Personal information
- Nationality: Australia
- Born: Christopher Pitt; 12 May 1965
- Died: 4 September 2025 (aged 60)

Sport
- Country: Australia
- Sport: Shooting

Christopher Pitt (also known as Chris Pitt) (12 May 1965 – 4 September 2025) was an Australian Paralympic shooter. He represented Australia at the 2016 Rio Paralympics and the 2020 Summer Paralympics.

== Personal ==
Pitt was born on 12 May 1965. At the age of ten, a virus led to him contracting degenerative muscle disease called dermatomyositis and by the age of twelve he was a wheelchair user. He grew up on a farm in Bundaberg, Queensland and cared for his mother. Nine months before the postponed 2021 Tokyo Paralympics, he had half of his tongue removed due to cancer. He went on to compete at the Tokyo Paralympics after surgeons took a piece out of Pitt’s leg and grafted it on to his tongue. He then had to endure 30 radiation treatments in six weeks.

== Shooting ==
Pitt took up shooting sport in 2010 and is classified as a SH1 shooter. He always had an interest in shooting due to life on the farm. His first international competition was the World Cup held in Szczecin Poland in April 2013 where he finished 13th. He won two gold medals at the 2013 Oceania World Championships in Sydney.

At the 2014 IPC World Championships in Hanover, Germany, he finished 11th in the 25m Pistol SH1 and 44th in the 10m Air Pistol SH1. Throughout 2015 Chris continued to perform consistently well with three top-10 results at World Cups.

Pitt has stated that he has been inspired by Rheed McCracken, a Bundaberg wheelchair racer.

Pitt competed in the 2016 Rio Paralympics in the Men's 10 metre air pistol SH1 event where he placed 14th, as well as competing in the Mixed 25 metre pistol SH1, where he placed 7th.

At the 2018 World Shooting Para Sport Championships in Cheongju, South Korea, he finished 42nd in Men's 10m Air Pistol SH1 and 17th in the Mixed 25m Pistol SH1.

At the 2020 Summer Paralympics, he finished 25th in the Men's 10m Air Pistol SH1 and 30th in the Mixed 25m Pistol SH1.
