= Sarah Calati =

Australian wheelchair tennis player

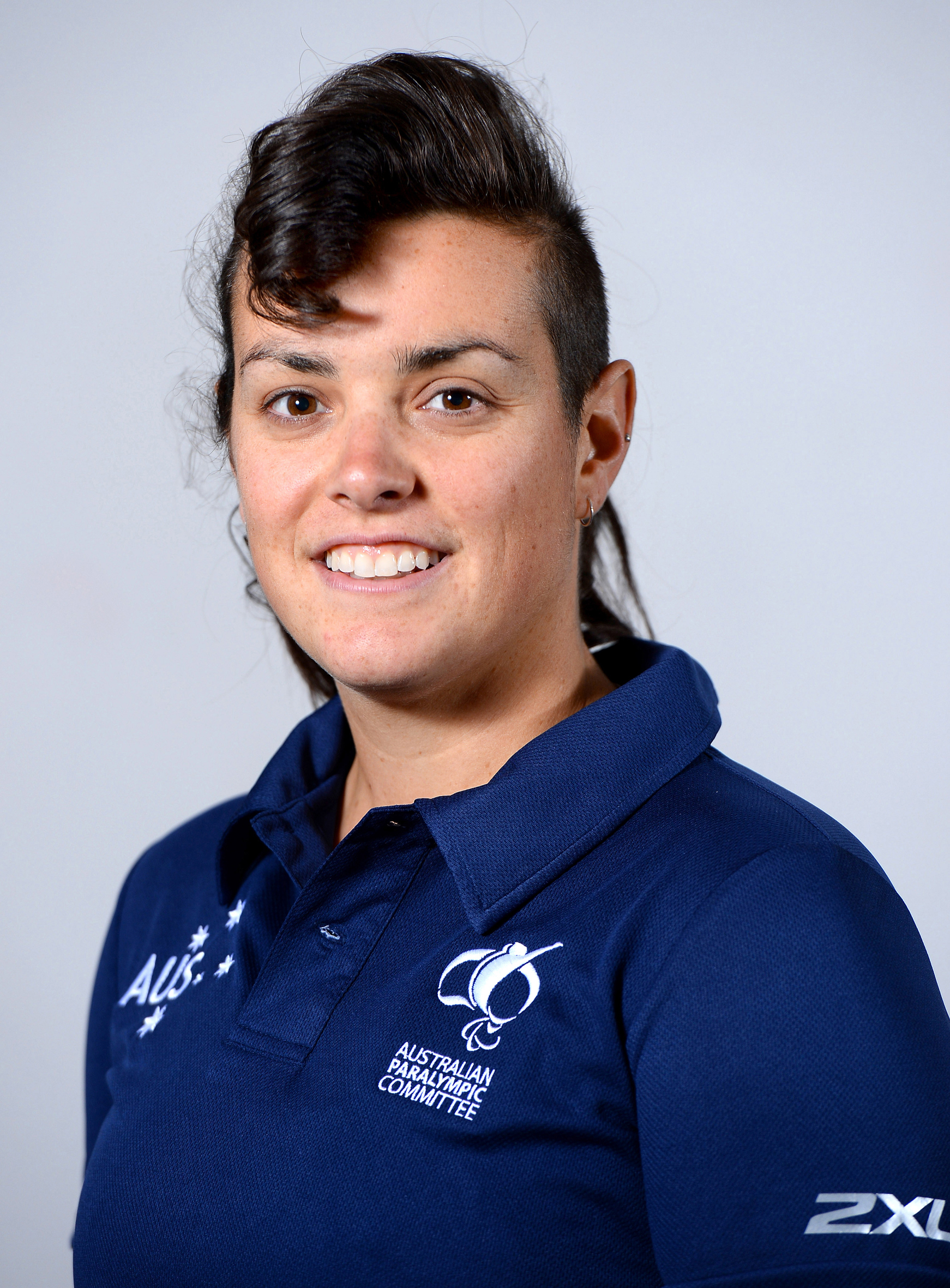
- Country (sports): Australia
- Residence: Melbourne, Victoria
- Born: 13 October 1986 (age 39) Victoria
- Plays: Right-handed

Sarah Calati (born 13 October 1986) is an Australian wheelchair tennis player. She competed for Australia at the 2016 Rio Paralympics.

== Personal ==
Calati was born on 12 October 1986. At motorcycle accident in 2006 led to the amputation of her right leg. In 2014, she was working four days a week for a landscaping business as a gardener.

== Wheelchair tennis ==
Her prosthetist recommended she take up sport and this led to a meeting with national wheelchair tennis coach Greg Crump in 2009. Calati made her international debut in 2012 at the BNP Paribas World Team Cup in India. As of August 2016, her singles ranking is 59 and her best ranking was 29 on 14 December 2015. She was allocated a place in the 2016 Rio Paralympics after Russia was suspended from the Games .

At the 2016 Rio Paralympics, Calati lost to Zhu Zhenzhen (CHN) 0-2 (0–6, 1–6) in the first round of the Women's Singles.
