= Bradley Mark =

New Zealand Paralympic shooter

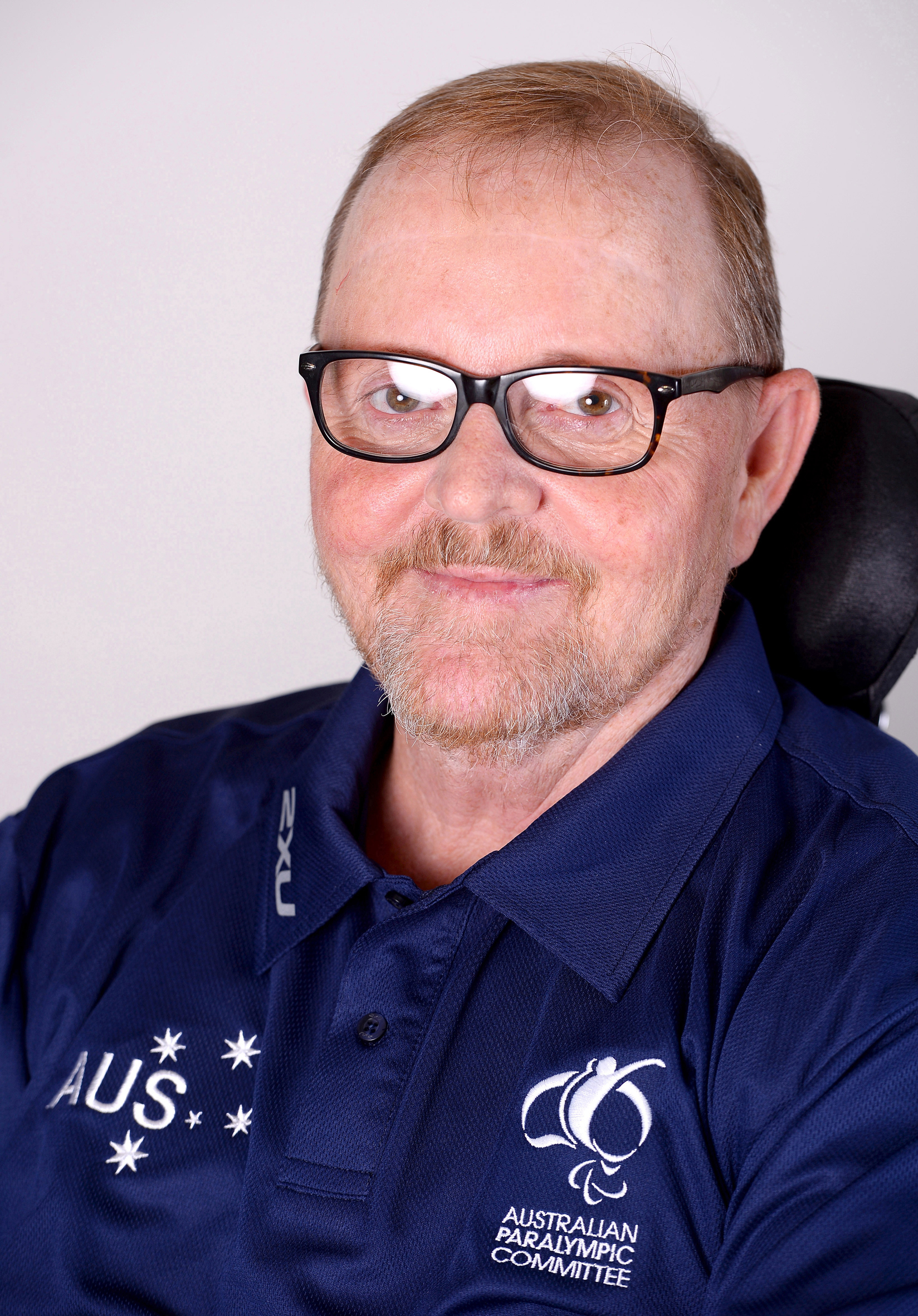
- 2016 Australian Paralympic team portrait

Personal information
- Nationality: Australian
- Born: 26 February 1957 (age 69) New Zealand

Sport
- Country: Australia
- Sport: Shooting
- Events: 10m standing air rifle 10m prone air rifle

Bradley Mark (born 26 February 1957) is a New Zealand born Australian shooter who has represented Australia in two Paralympic Games.

== Personal ==
Mark was born on 26 February 1957 in New Zealand. He is from Wynnum, Queensland. He has incomplete quadriplegia as a result of bacterial meningitis when he was thirty-five years old. He was a 2011 Queensland Sporting Wheelies Senior Male Athlete of the Year nominee. He has a dog from Assistant Dogs Australia who helps him complete tasks which allow for greater independence.

== Shooting ==
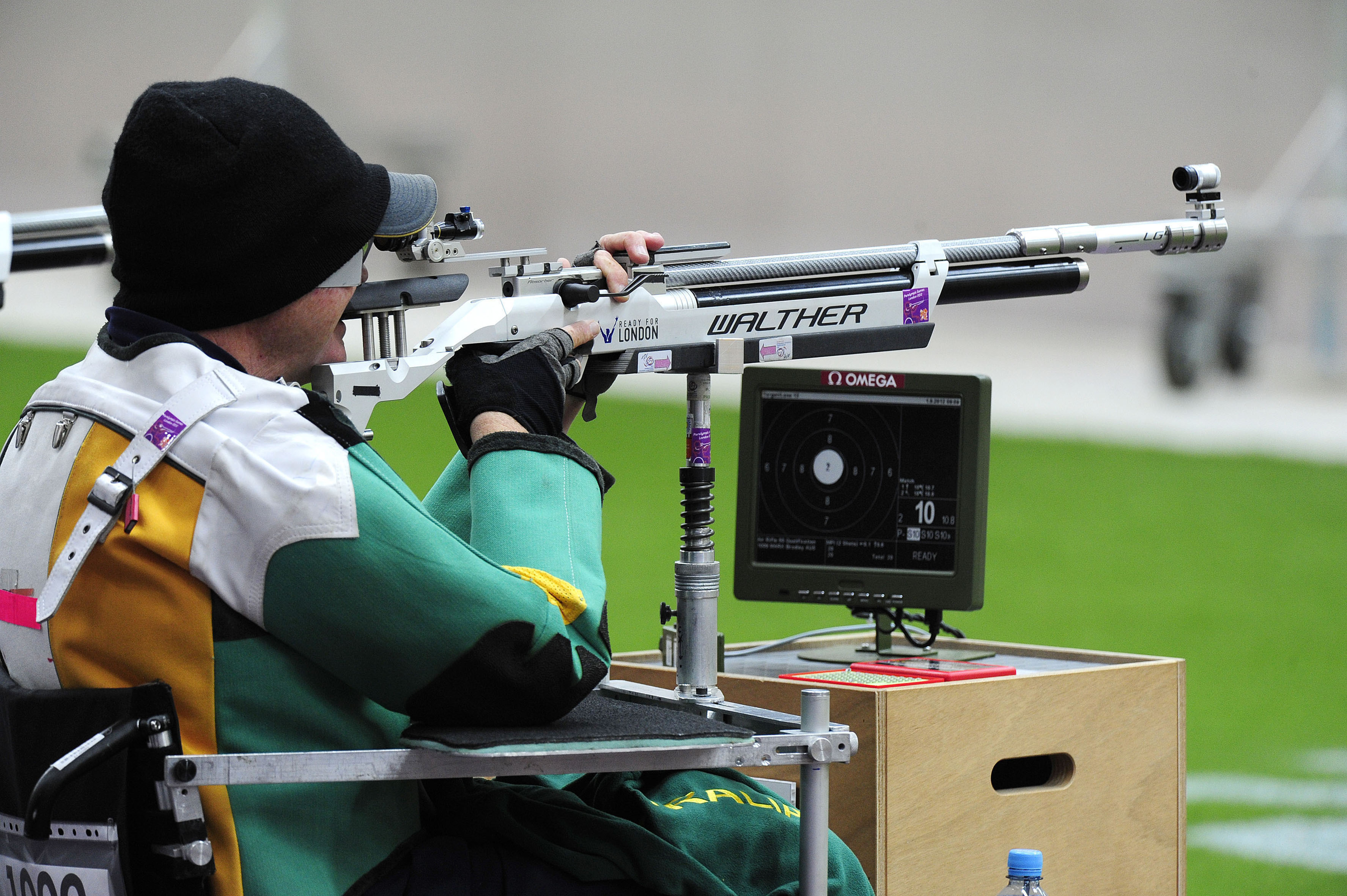
Mark shooting at the 2012 London Paralympics

Mark is an SH2 classified shooter specialising in 10m standing air rifle and 10m prone air rifle events.

Mark started competitive shooting in 2005. He first represented Australia in 2009. At the 2011 World Cup in Turkey, he won a gold medal. He repeated his gold medal performance at the 2011 World Cup in Sydney. He was selected to represent Australia at the 2012 Summer Paralympics in shooting. The 2012 Games were his first. He did not medal.

At the 2014 IPC World Championships, he finished 24th in the 10m Air Rifle Standing SH2 and 16th in the 10m Air Rifle Prone SH2. In 2015, his best results were at the IPC World Cup in Sydney where he was 2nd in the 10m Air Rifle Prone SH2 and 3rd in the 10m Air Rifle Prone SH2. Mark's results qualified him to compete at the 2016 Rio Paralympics. He did not medal, placing 9th in the prone event and 12th in the standing event.

He is a Queensland Academy of Sport scholarship holder.
