= Tamsin Colley =

Australian Paralympic athlete

Personal information
- Full name: Tamsin Colley
- Nationality: Australia
- Born: 10 September 2002 (age 24)

Sport
- Club: Randwick-Botany Harriers

Tamsin Colley (born 10 September 2002) is an Australian Paralympic athlete. She represented Australia at the 2016 Rio Paralympics. She was the youngest athlete on the entire 2016 Australian Paralympic Team, at the age of 13 and 362 days on the day of the Opening Ceremony.

== Personal ==
She was born on 10 September 2002. As an infant, she had a brain tumour removed but this has led ataxia, which is a permanent neurological disease affecting the co-ordination of gross and fine motor movement. She required assistance to help her walk until she was three and a half and was also in a wheelchair for a long time. She attended Kensington Public School. In 2016, she attended Randwick Girls' High School.

== Career ==
She is classified as a T36. Colley has broken Australian records for her classification in under-16 and 18 100m sprints. She also holds the national record in under-16, 18 and 20 for 400m and 800m running and long jump.

At the 2016 Rio Paralympics, Colley competed in the T36 200m and placed 11th overall with a time of 37.80 .
