= Brant Garvey =

Australian paratriathlete

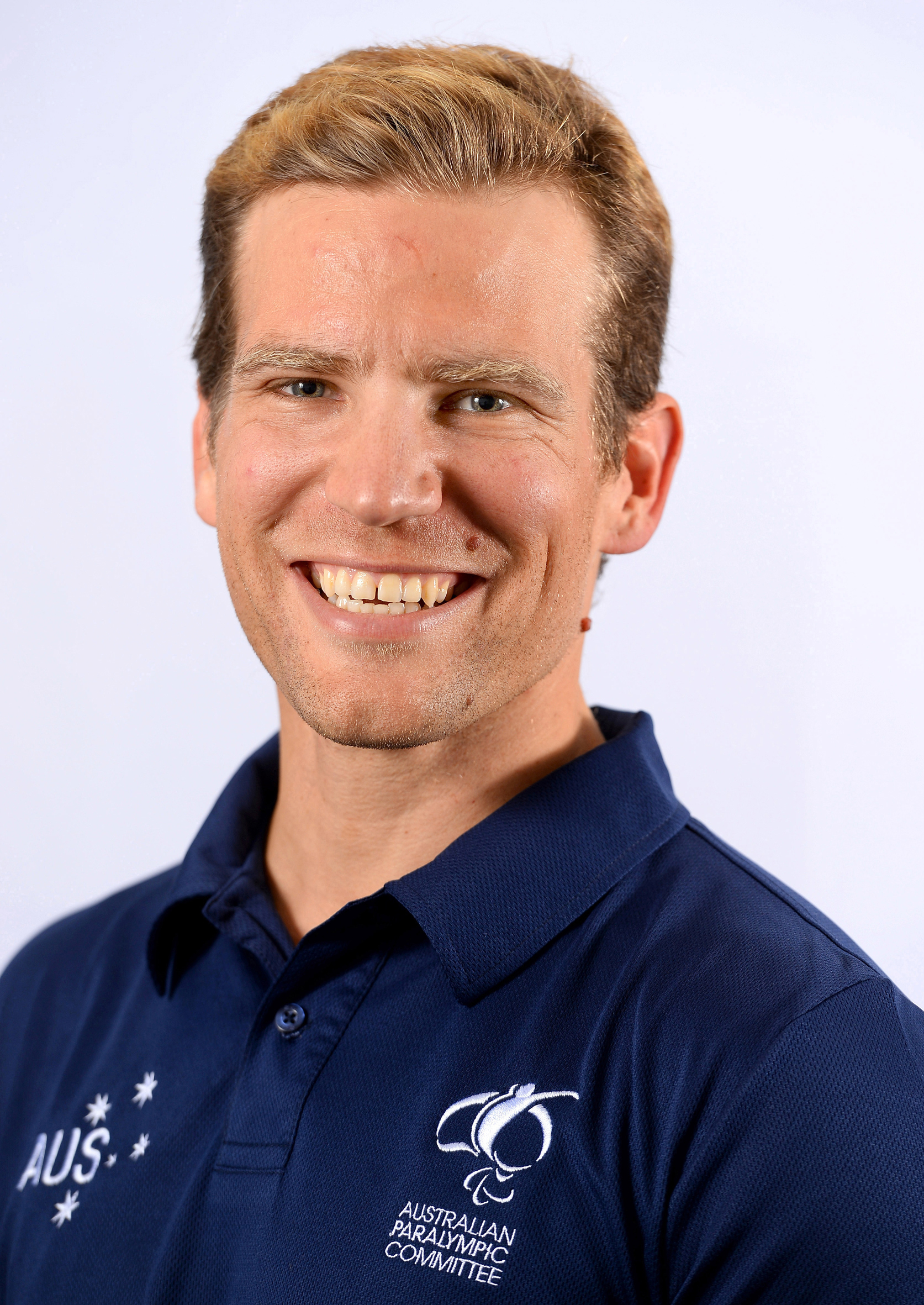
- 2016 Australian Paralympic team portrait

Personal information
- Nationality: Australian
- Born: 9 January 1985 (age 41) Darwin, Northern Territory

Sport
- Club: Exceed Triathlon Club
Medal record
Men's paratriathlon
Representing Australia
Oceania Championships
| Gold medal – first place | 2014 Penrith | PT2 |
| Gold medal – first place | 2015 Penrith | PT2 |
| Gold medal – first place | 2016 Devonport | PT2 |
| Gold medal – first place | 2017 Devonport | PTS2 |
| Gold medal – first place | 2018 St. Kilda | PTS2 |

Brant Garvey (born 9 January 1985) is an Australian leg amputee paratriathlete. He represented Australia at the 2016 Rio Paralympics when paratriathlon made its debut at the Paralympics.

== Personal ==
Garvey was born on 9 January 1985 in Darwin, Northern Territory. He is a congenital above the knee amputee. His sister was diagnosed with three types of cancer at the age of fourteen and this has inspired Garvey to accept sporting challenges. He lives in Perth, Western Australia. He is the founder of noXcuses, an Australian apparel company for triathletes and fitness enthusiasts. In 2025, he was appointed Western Australian Instute of Sport.

Garvey is married to Natalie.

== Career ==
Prior to taking up paratriathlon, Garvey was a successful swimmer and wheelchair basketballer. He competed in wheelchair basketball for Australia at the 2002 FESPIC Games held in Korea. He was a member of the Perth Wheelcats that won five Australian Wheelchair Basketball Championships and has played professional wheelchair basketball in Spain for two years. He has completed Rottnest Channel Swim five times.

At the age of twenty-eight, he decided to try and run for the first time using a prosthetic leg and his first event was the HBF Run for a Reason over 12 km. In 2013, he completed an ironman triathlon consisting of a 3.8 km swim, a 180 km bike ride and a 42.2 km marathon run. He finished in a time of 11:49:20 and became the first Australian above-knee amputee to complete an ironman triathlon.

Garvey is classified as a PT2 paratriathlete. Garvey's first major international event was the 2013 ITU Grand Final in London where he finished sixth. In 2016, he qualified Australia a quota place in the 2016 Rio Paralympics by finishing second at International Triathlon Union event on the Gold Coast, Queensland. In May, 2016, he finished second in the Yokohama ITU World Paratriathlon PT2 Event. In 2016, he is a Western Australian Institute of Sport scholarship holder and coached by Ross Pedlow.

In 2016, he was awarded the Western Australian Institute of Sport Personal Excellence Award for his efforts in setting up and flourishing personal branding business, titled noXcuses.

=== World Triathlon Grand Final (Championships) Results ===
- 2013 London - 6th TRI-2
- 2014 Edmonton - 6th PT2
- 2015 Chicago - 6th PT2
- 2017 Rotterdam - 8th TS2

=== Oceania Championships ===
- 2014 Sydney - 1st PT2
- 2015 Sydney - 1st PT2
- 2016 Devonport - 1st PT2

=== Paralympics ===
- 2016 Rio - 10th PT2

In 2016, Garvey competed in the 2016 Rio Paralympic Games and placed 10th in the Men's PT2 event. Reflecting on his performance, Garvey states "I was in excruciating pain, dropped a few swear words, lucky they (the Brazilian fans) don't speak English as a first language. I didn't think I was going to be able to run but managed to get into a bit of a rhythm and finished my first Paralympic Games."
