= Kate Doughty =

Australian triathlete and psychologist

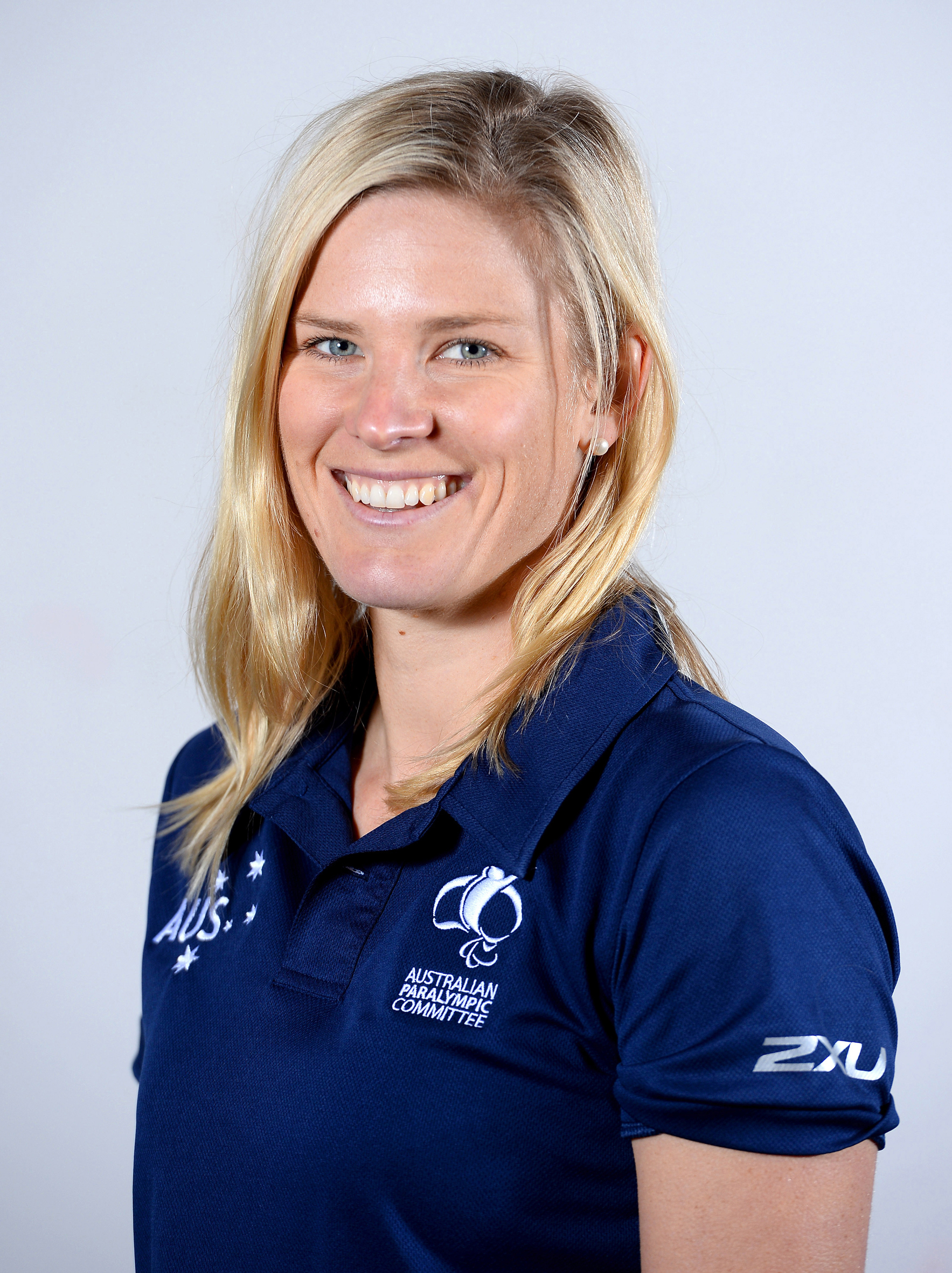
- 2016 Australian Paralympic team portrait

Personal information
- Nickname: Kato
- Nationality: Australia
- Born: 13 August 1983 (age 43)
Medal record
Representing Australia
Women's Triathlon
World Championships
Bronze medal – third place	2015 Chicago	PT4
Oceania Championships
Gold medal – first place	2016 Devonport	PT4
Gold medal – first place	2019 Newcastle	PTS5
Gold medal – first place	2020 Newcastle	PTS5

Kate Næss (née Doughty) (born 13 August 1983) is an Australian paraequestrian and paratriathlete. She won a bronze medal at the 2015 World Triathlon Grand Final. She represented Australia at the 2016 Rio Paralympics when paratriathlon made its debut at the Paralympics.

== Personal life ==
Doughty was born on 13 August 1983. She was born without her right hand. Doughty has completed a master's degree in Organisational & Industrial Psychology at Deakin University. She is employed as a psychologist and management consultant in Melbourne. She is patron of the Aussie Hands Foundation Inc. Her father Anthony is a bookmaker in Melbourne. She married Norwegian Jarle Naess in early 2018 and they have a son Henrik.

== Career ==
=== Equestrian ===
Began riding horses at the age of six. Her parents were involved in the horse industry. Her equestrian achievements include:

- 2005 Victorian Championships - 2nd
- 2005 Riding Disabled Australia Nationals - 1st section 4B; 3rd section 4a
- 2006 British Nationals - 1st & 3rd
- 2008 Selection Trials for Beijing Paralympics
- 2009 Carlton performance Horses Championship - Medium Champion
- 2009 Victorian Dressage Club Championships Elem Freestyle - 1st
- 2010 Australian Team at the World Equestrian Games in Kentucky, USA

=== Triathlon ===
Doughty competes in the PT4 classification. in 2015, she first competed in paratriathlon competitions. 2015 results include:

- 2nd - OTU Paratriathlon Oceania Championships - Penrith
- 2nd ITU World Paratriathlon Event - Sunshine Coast
- 1st - 2015 Australian Paratriathlon Championships
- 1st ITU World Paratriathlon Event - Yokohoma
- 3rd - ITU World Paratriathlon Event - Detroit
- 3rd - ITU World Triathlon Grand Final - Chicago

Doughty had the goal of competing at the 2016 Rio Paralympics and placed fifth in the Women's PT4 event. In reflection on her event she states "My aim is go out and do the best I can and to walk away knowing that I did everything I could do to execute my best on race day." Doughty also recalls "I've been wanting to come to the Paralympics and compete and I thought I'd be doing it on a horse. So doing it on my own legs was a shock."

At the 2019 ITU World Triathlon Grand Final in Lausanne, she finished sixth in the Women's PTS5.

She announced her retirement from elite triathlon in August 2020.

== Recognition ==
- 2004 - Equestrian Federation of Australia Young Rider of the Year finalist
- 2007 "Leader" Sports Star of the Year – Eastern Region
- 2015 - Victorian Institute of Sport scholarship holder
