= Paralympic record progression track cycling – Men's 1 km time trial =

This is an overview of the progression of the Paralympic track cycling record of the men's 1 km time trial as recognised by the Union Cycliste Internationale (UCI) and IPC.

== C5 Progression ==
Time	Cyclists	Class	Location	Track	Date	Competition	Ref
1:05:947	Alfonso Cabello (ESP)	C5	London (GBR)	Indoor track	31 August 2012	2012 Paralympic Games	
1:04.733	Jon-Allan Butterworth (GBR)	C5	Rio (BRA)	Indoor track	9 September 2016	2016 Paralympic Games	
1:04.494	Alfonso Cabello (ESP)	C5	Rio (BRA)	Indoor track	9 September 2016	2016 Paralympic Games	
1:01.557	Alfonso Cabello (ESP)	C5	Izu (JPN)	Indoor track	26 August 2021	2020 Paralympic Games	

== C4 Progression ==
Time	Cyclists	Class	Location	Track	Date	Competition	Ref
1:05:466	Jody Cundy (GBR)	C4	Beijing (CHN)	Indoor track	9 September 2008	2008 Paralympic Games	
1:04.492	Jody Cundy (GBR)	C4	Rio (BRA)	Indoor track	9 September 2016	2016 Paralympic Games	
1:02.529	Jody Cundy (GBR)	C4	Izu (JPN)	Indoor track	26 August 2021	2020 Paralympic Games	
1:02.021	Korey Boddington (AUS)	C4	Saint-Quentin-en-Yvelines (FRA)	Indoor track	30 August 2024	2024 Paralympic Games	

== C3 Progression ==
Time	Cyclists	Class	Location	Track	Date	Competition	Ref
1:14.472	Darren Kenny (GBR)	C3	Athens (GRE)	Indoor track	18 September 2004	2004 Paralympic Games	
1.08.667	Darren Kenny (GBR)	C3	Beijing (CHN)	Indoor track	9 September 2008	2008 Paralympic Games	
1:05.569	Jaco van Gass (GBR)	C3	Izu (JPN)	Indoor track	26 August 2021	2020 Paralympic Games	
1:05.083	Jaco van Gass (GBR)	C3	Saint-Quentin-en-Yvelines (FRA)	Indoor track	31 August 2024	2024 Paralympic Games	
1:04.825	Jaco van Gass (GBR)	C3	Saint-Quentin-en-Yvelines (FRA)	Indoor track	31 August 2024	2024 Paralympic Games	

== C2 Progression ==
Time	Cyclists	Class	Location	Track	Date	Competition	Ref
1:15.858	Tobias Graf (GER)	C2	London (GBR)	Indoor track	30 August 2012	2012 Paralympic Games	
1:14.716	Tristen Chernove (CAN)	C2	Rio (BRA)	Indoor track	11 September 2016	2016 Paralympic Games	
1:09.211	Alexandre Léauté (FRA)	C2	Izu (JPN)	Indoor track	26 August 2021	2020 Paralympic Games	
1:08.020	Alexandre Léauté (FRA)	C2	Saint-Quentin-en-Yvelines (FRA)	Indoor track	31 August 2024	2024 Paralympic Games	
1:07.944	Alexandre Léauté (FRA)	C2	Saint-Quentin-en-Yvelines (FRA)	Indoor track	31 August 2024	2024 Paralympic Games	

== C1 Progression ==
Time	Cyclists	Class	Location	Track	Date	Competition	Ref
1:13.009	Li Zhangyu (CHN)	C1	London (GBR)	Indoor track	30 August 2012	2012 Paralympic Games	
1:11.937	Li Zhangyu (CHN)	C1	Rio (BRA)	Indoor track	11 September 2016	2016 Paralympic Games	
1:08.347	Li Zhangyu (CHN)	C1	Izu (JPN)	Indoor track	26 August 2021	2020 Paralympic Games	

== B Progression ==
Time	Cyclists	Class	Location	Track	Date	Competition	Ref
1:06.858	Patrice Senmartin (FRA); Thierry Gintrand (FRA)	B	Atlanta (USA)	Indoor track	17 August 1996	1996 Paralympic Games	
1:04.950	Shigeo Yoshihara (JPN); Koichi Mizusawa (JPN)	B	Sydney (AUS)	Indoor track	23 October 2000	2000 Paralympic Games	
1:01.351	Neil Fachie (GBR); Barney Storey (GBR)	B	London (GBR)	Indoor track	1 September 2012	2012 Paralympic Games	
59.822	Tristan Bangma (NED); Teun Mulder (NED)	B	Rio (BRA)	Indoor track	11 September 2016	2016 Paralympic Games	
58.038	Neil Fachie (GBR); Matt Rotherham (GBR)	B	Izu (JPN)	Indoor track	28 August 2021	2020 Paralympic Games	
