= Spain at the 2024 Summer Paralympics =

- Flag of Spain
- IPC code: ESP
- NPC: Spanish Paralympic Committee

in Paris, France August 28, 2024 – September 8, 2024
- Competitors: 147 in 16 sports
- Flag bearers: Marta Arce Payno; Alvaro Valera
- Medals Ranked 17th: Gold 7 Silver 11 Bronze 22 Total 40

Summer Paralympics appearances (overview)
- 1968; 1972; 1976; 1980; 1984; 1988; 1992; 1996; 2000; 2004; 2008; 2012; 2016; 2020; 2024

Spain competed at the 2024 Summer Paralympics in Paris, France, from 28 August to 8 September.

== Medalists ==
Medal	Name	Sport	Event	Date
Gold	Anastasiya Dmytriv	Swimming	100 m breaststroke SB8	30 August
Gold	Yassine Ouhdadi El Ataby	Athletics	Men's 5000 m T13	31 August
Gold	Iñigo Llopis Sanz	Swimming	100 m backstroke S8	31 August
Gold	Daniel Molina	Triathlon	Men's PTS3	2 September
Gold	Susana Rodríguez; Pilot: Sara Pérez Sala	Triathlon	Women's PTVI	2 September
Gold	Ricardo Ten Argilés	Cycling	Men's time trial C1	4 September
Gold	Sergio Garrote Muñoz	Cycling	Men's time trial H2	4 September
Silver	Sara Martínez Puntero	Athletics	Women's Long jump T12	1 September
Silver	Ricardo Ten Argiles; Pablo Jaramillo Gallardo; Alfonso Cabello Llamas	Cycling	Mixed team sprint C1–5	1 September
Silver	Antoni Ponce Bertrán	Swimming	Men's 100m breaststroke SB5	1 September
Silver	Marta Francés Gómez	Triathlon	Women's PTS4	2 September
Silver	Núria Marquès	Swimming	Women's 100m backstroke S9	3 September
Silver	Marta Fernández Infante	Swimming	Women's 100m freestyle S3	3 September
Silver	David José Pineda Mejía	Athletics	Men's 400m T20	3 September
Silver	Eduardo Santas Asensio	Cycling	Men's time trial C1	4 September
Silver	Sergio Garrote Muñoz	Cycling	Men's road race H1-2	5 September
Silver	Núria Marquès	Swimming	Women's 200 m individual medley SM9	5 September
Silver	Alberto Suárez Laso	Athletics	Men's marathon T12	8 September
Bronze	Ricardo Ten Argilés	Cycling	Men's pursuit C1	29 August
Bronze	Miguel Luque	Swimming	Men's 50m breaststroke SB3	29 August
Bronze	Enrique Alhambra	Swimming	Men's 100m butterfly S13	29 August
Bronze	Alba García Falagán	Athletics	Women's Long jump T11	30 August
Bronze	Alfonso Cabello	Cycling	Men's time trial C4-5	30 August
Bronze	Joan Munar Martínez	Athletics	Men's long jump T11	30 August
Bronze	María Delgado Nadal	Swimming	Women's 100 backstroke S12	31 August
Bronze	Teresa Perales	Swimming	Women's 50m backstroke S2	31 August
Bronze	Juan Antonio Saavedra Reinaldo	Shooting	R3 – 10 m air rifle prone SH1	1 September
Bronze	Nil Riudavets	Triathlon	Men's PTS4	2 September
Bronze	Marta Fernández Infante	Swimming	Women's 50m backstroke S3	2 September
Bronze	Núria Marquès Soto; Oscar Salguero Galisteo; Iñigo Llopis Sanz; Sarai Gascon; Anastasiya Dmytriv; José Antonio Mari	Swimming	Mixed 4x100 medley relay - 34 points	2 September
Bronze	Alvaro del Amo Cano	Athletics	Men's shot put F11	2 September
Bronze	Damián Ramos	Cycling	Men's time trial C4	4 September
Bronze	Marta Fernández Infante	Swimming	Women's 50 m breaststroke SB3	4 September
Bronze	Judith Rodríguez Menéndez	Fencing	Women's foil A	4 September
Bronze	Jose Ramon Cantero Elvira; Maria Delgado Nadal; Emma Feliu Martin; Enrique Alhambra	Swimming	Mixed 4x100 freestyle relay - 49 points	4 September
Bronze	Alvaro del Amo Cano	Athletics	Men's discus throw F11	5 September
Bronze	Anastasiya Dmytriv	Swimming	Women's 200 m individual medley SM9	5 September
Bronze	Daniel Caverzaschi; Martín de la Puente	Wheelchair tennis	Men's doubles	6 September
Bronze	Marta Arce	Judo	Women's −57 kg J2	6 September
Bronze	Ander Cepas	Table tennis	Men's individual C9	7 September

=== Medals by sport ===
Medals by sport
Sport	Gold medal	Silver medal	Bronze medal	Total
Swimming	2	4	9	15
Cycling	2	3	3	8
Triathlon	2	1	1	4
Athletics	1	3	4	8
Fencing	0	0	1	1
Judo	0	0	1	1
Shooting	0	0	1	1
Table tennis	0	0	1	1
Tennis	0	0	1	1
Total	7	11	22	40

=== Medals by date ===
Medals by date
Day	Date	Gold medal	Silver medal	Bronze medal	Total
1	29 Aug	0	0	3	3
2	30 Aug	1	0	3	4
3	31 Aug	2	0	2	4
4	1 Sep	0	3	1	4
5	2 Sep	2	1	4	7
6	3 Sep	0	3	0	3
7	4 Sep	2	1	4	7
8	5 Sep	0	2	2	4
9	6 Sep	0	0	2	2
10	7 Sep	0	0	1	1
11	8 Sep	0	1	0	1
Total		7	11	22	40

=== Multiple medalists ===
Multiple medalists
Name	Sport	1st place, gold medalist(s)	2nd place, silver medalist(s)	3rd place, bronze medalist(s)	Total
Ricardo Ten Argilés	Cycling	1	1	1	3
Anastasiya Dmytriv	Swimming	1	0	2	3
Núria Marquès	Swimming	0	2	1	3
Marta Fernández Infante	Swimming	0	1	2	3
Sergio Garrote Muñoz	Cycling	1	1	0	2
Iñigo Llopis Sanz	Swimming	1	0	1	2
Alfonso Cabello	Cycling	0	1	1	2
Enrique Alhambra	Swimming	0	0	2	2
Maria Delgado Nadal	Swimming	0	0	2	2
Alvaro del Amo Cano	Athletics	0	0	2	2

== Competitors ==
The following is the list of number of competitors in the Games.

Sport	Men	Women	Total
Archery	1	0	1
Athletics	18	12	30
Boccia	1	2	3
Cycling	7	0	7
Judo	2	2	4
Paracanoeing	4	2	6
Paratriathlon	8	5	13
Powerlifting	0	1	1
Rowing	3	3	6
Shooting	2	0	2
Swimming	21	13	34
Table tennis	10	0	10
Taekwondo	1	1	2
Wheelchair basketball	12	12	24
Wheelchair fencing	0	1	1
Wheelchair tennis	3	0	3
Total	93	54	147

== Archery ==
Spain secured a quota places in men's compound event by virtue of their result at the 2023 World Para Archery Championships in Plzeň, Czech Republic.

Athlete	Event	Ranking Round		Round of 32	Round of 16	Quarterfinals	Semifinals	Finals	
Athlete	Event	Score	Seed	Opposition Score	Opposition Score	Opposition Score	Opposition Score	Opposition Score	Rank
Fernando Gale Montorio	Men's individual compound	678	26	Polish (USA); L138-142	Did not advance				=17

== Athletics ==
Spanish track and field athletes achieved quota places for the following events based on their results at the 2023 World Championships, 2024 World Championships, or through high performance allocation, as long as they meet the minimum entry standard (MES).

Key

- Note–Ranks given for track events are within the athlete's heat only
- Q = Qualified for the next round
- q = Qualified for the next round as a fastest loser or, in field events, by position without achieving the qualifying target
- DQ = Disqualified
- WR = World Record
- PR = Paralympic Record
- AR = Area (or continental) Record
- NR = National Record
- PB = Personal Best
- SB = Season's Best
- N/A = Round not applicable for the event
- Bye = Athlete not required to compete in round

Men's track

Athlete	Event	Heat		Semifinals		Final	
Athlete	Event	Result	Rank	Result	Rank	Result	Rank
Joan Munar Martínez; Guide: Guillermo Rojo Gil	100 m T11	11.61 PB	11 q	11.61 PB	11	Did not advance	
Gustavo Nieves	Marathon T12	—N/a				2:29.26 SB	8
Yassine Ouhdadi El Ataby	1500 m T13	—N/a				3:46.20 WR	5
Yassine Ouhdadi El Ataby	5000 m T13	—N/a				15:50.64	1st place, gold medalist(s)
David José Pineda Mejía	400 m T20	—N/a				48.24	2nd place, silver medalist(s)
Wisdom Ikhiuwu Smith	100 m T13	11.74	12	Did not advance			
Alberto Suárez Laso	Marathon T12	—N/a				2:24.02 SB	2nd place, silver medalist(s)
Eduardo Manuel Uceda Novas; Guide: Diego Folgado Muñoz	100 m T11	11.37 PB	6 q	11.34 PB	6	Did not advance	
Eduardo Manuel Uceda Novas; Guide: Diego Folgado Muñoz	400 m T11	52.79	5 Q	52.16	5	Did not advance	

Women's track

Athlete	Event	Heat		Semifinals		Final	
Athlete	Event	Result	Rank	Result	Rank	Result	Rank
Sara Andrés Barrio	100 m T64	13.20	6 q	—N/a		13.03	4
Melani Bergés Gámez; Guide: Sergio Díaz del Campo	100 m T12	12.44 PB	7 q	12.50	6	Did not advance	
Melani Bergés Gámez; Guide: Sergio Díaz del Campo	200 m T12	25.79 PB	6 Q	25.43 PB	6	Did not advance	
Elena Congost; Guide: Mia Carol Bruguera	Marathon T12	—N/a				3:00.48 SB	(bronze) /DSQ
Nagore Folgado García; Guide: Joan Raga Varo	100 m T12	12.35 PB	5 q	12.55	8	Did not advance	
Nagore Folgado García; Guide: Joan Raga Varo	200 m T12	26.74	13	Did not advance			
Alba García Falagán	100 m T11	12.90 SB	9	Did not advance			
Adiaratou Iglesias Forneiro	100 m T13	12.46 SB	3 Q	—N/a		12.51	5
Adiaratou Iglesias Forneiro	400 m T13	58.07 SB	6 q	—N/a		56.98 SB	4
Sara Martínez Puntero; Guide: Jaime Martínez Puntero	400 m T12	DNS		—N/a		Did not advance	
María Del Carmen Paredes Rodríguez; Guide: Lorenzo Sánchez Martín	Marathon T12	—N/a				3:36.29	10
Fiona Pinar Batalla	100 m T64	13.73	13	—N/a		Did not advance	
Fiona Pinar Batalla	200 m T64	27.42 PB	2 Q	—N/a		27.87	7

Men's field

Athlete	Event	Final	
Athlete	Event	Distance	Position
Álvaro del Amo Cano	Shot put F11	13.38 PB	3rd place, bronze medalist(s)
Álvaro del Amo Cano	Discus throw F11	39.60 PB	3rd place, bronze medalist(s)
Héctor Cabrera Llácer	Shot put F12	12.92	8
Héctor Cabrera Llácer	Javelin throw F13	66.04 SB	4
Iván José Cano Blanco	Long jump T13	6.76	5
Wisdom Ikhiuwu Smith	Long jump T13	5.98	8
Kim López González	Shot put F12	15.60	4
Joan Munar Martínez	Long jump T11	6.32	3rd place, bronze medalist(s)

Women's field

Athlete	Event	Final	
Athlete	Event	Distance	Position
Sara Andrés Barrio	Long jump T64	4.52	10
Sara Fernández Roldán	Long jump T12	4.75	8
Sydney Fokou Takam	Long jump T12	4.84	7
Alba García Falagán	Long jump T11	4.76	3rd place, bronze medalist(s)
Sara Martínez Puntero	Long jump T12	5.40 SB	2nd place, silver medalist(s)
Desirée Vila Bargiela	Long jump T63	3.98	9

== Boccia ==
Spain entered two athletes, to compete in the BC4 event, by winning the bronze medal in the mixed pairs event for BC4, at the 2024 Paralympic Qualification Tournament in Coimbra, Portugal.

Athlete	Event	Pool matches				Quarterfinals	Semifinals	Final / BM	
Athlete	Event	Opposition Score	Opposition Score	Opposition Score	Rank	Opposition Score	Opposition Score	Opposition Score	Rank
Vasile Agache	Men's individual BC4	Chica (COL); L 2–4	Komar (CRO); L 0–18	Streharsky (SVK); L 3–4	4	Did not advance			
Amagoia Arrieta	Women's individual BC1	Aubert (FRA); L 3–3*	Tan (SGP); L 1–5	—N/a	3	Did not advance			
Sara Aller Mayo	Women's individual BC4	Chica (COL); L 2–4	Morfi (GRE); L 0–7	Arambasic (CRO); L 0–9	4	Did not advance			
Vasile Agache; Sara Aller Mayo	Mixed pairs BC4	Larpyen / Phonsila (THA); L 2–8	Streharsky / Vozarova (SVK); L 2–6	—N/a	3	Did not advance			

== Cycling ==
Alfonso Cabello, Luis García-Marquina, Sergio Garrote Muñoz, Pablo Jaramillo, Damián Ramos Sánchez, Eduardo Santas Asensio and Ricardo Ten have all qualified to compete.

Men's road

Athlete	Event	Time	Rank
Luis Miguel García-Marquina	Road race H3	1:39:39	4
Luis Miguel García-Marquina	Time trial H3	47:07.04	6
Sergio Garrote Muñoz	Road race H1-2	1:20:40	2nd place, silver medalist(s)
Sergio Garrote Muñoz	Time trial H2	24:33.71	1st place, gold medalist(s)
Eduardo Santas Asensio	Road race C1-2-3	1:50:42	10
Eduardo Santas Asensio	Time trial C3	39:12.71	2nd place, silver medalist(s)
Ricardo Ten	Road race C1-2-3	1:50:37	9
Ricardo Ten	Time trial C1	20:39.53	1st place, gold medalist(s)
Damián Ramos	Road race C4-5	2:26:07	10
Damián Ramos	Time trial C4	38:05.94	3rd place, bronze medalist(s)

Men's track

Athlete	Event	Qualification		Final	
Athlete	Event	Time	Rank	Opposition Time	Rank
Alfonso Cabello	Kilo C4-5	1:02.050	3 Q	1:01.969	3rd place, bronze medalist(s)
Pablo Jaramillo Gallardo	Kilo C4-5	1:06.634	13	Did not advance	
Eduardo Santas Asensio	Individual pursuit C3	3:25.874	3 Q	3:28.617	4
Ricardo Ten	Kilo C1-2-3	1:14.719	13	Did not advance	
Ricardo Ten	Individual pursuit C1	3:43.765	3 Q	3:45.152	3rd place, bronze medalist(s)
Damián Ramos	Individual pursuit C4	4:35.156	8	Did not advance	

Mixed

Athlete	Event	Heats		Final	
Athlete	Event	Result	Rank	Result	Rank
Ricardo Ten Argiles; Pablo Jaramillo Gallardo; Alfonso Cabello Llamas	Mixed team sprint C1–5	49.466	2 Q	49.564	2nd place, silver medalist(s)

== Judo ==
Luis Gavilán Lorenzo, Sergio Ibáñez, Marta Arce Payno and María Manzanero have all qualified to compete.

Men

Athlete	Event	Round of 16	Quarterfinals	Repechage 1	Semifinals	Repechage 2	Final / BM	
Athlete	Event	Opposition Result	Opposition Result	Opposition Result	Opposition Result	Opposition Result	Opposition Result	Rank
Luis Gavilán	−60 kg J2	Rubin (FRA); W 10–00	Namozov (UZB); L 00–10	Bye	—N/a	da Silva (BRA); L 00–10	Did not advance	7
Sergio Ibáñez	−73 kg J2	Kim (KOR); L 00–01	Did not advance					9

Women

Athlete	Event	Round of 16	Quarterfinals	Semifinals	Repechage	Final / BM	
Athlete	Event	Opposition Result	Opposition Result	Opposition Result	Opposition Result	Opposition Result	Rank
María Manzanero	−57 kg J1	da Silva (BRA); L 00–10	Did not advance				=9
Marta Arce	−57 kg J2	Bye	Yesilyurt (TUR); W 11–00	Khodjaeva (UZB); L 00–01	—N/a	Teixeira (BRA); W 10–00	3rd place, bronze medalist(s)

== Paracanoeing ==
Spain earned quota places for the following events through the 2023 ICF Canoe Sprint World Championships in Duisburg, Germany; and 2024 ICF Canoe Sprint World Championships in Szeged, Hungary.

Men

Athlete	Event	Heats		Semifinal		Final	
Athlete	Event	Time	Rank	Time	Rank	Time	Rank
Adrian Castaño	KL1	58.13	4 Q	55.20	4	Did not advance	
Juan Antonio Valle	KL3	42.34	1 Q	—N/a		40.76	4
Higinio Rivero	VL2	59.26	4 Q	56.28	4	Did not advance	
Adrian Mosquera	VL3	52.38	5 Q	50.74	4 FB	52.54	10

Women

Athlete	Event	Heats		Semifinal		Final	
Athlete	Event	Time	Rank	Time	Rank	Time	Rank
Ines Felipe Vidigal	VL2	1:11.35	5 Q	1:09.35	4 FB	1:08.31	9
Ines Felipe Vidigal	KL2	1:03.26	5 Q	1:02.63	3 FA	1:02.12	8
Araceli Mendiuna	KL3	49.69	3 Q	49.48	2 FA	48.93	4

== Paratriathlon ==
Héctor Catalá Laparra (with guide: Carlos Oliver Vives), Marta Francés Gómez, José Luis García Serrano (with guide: Diego Méntrida Zamarra), Diego Lardón Ferrer, Rakel Mateo, Andrea Miguélez, Daniel Molina, Eva María Moral Pedrero, Lionel Morales González, Nil Riudavets, Susana Rodríguez Gacio (with guide: Sara Pérez Sala), Jairo Ruiz López and Alejandro Sánchez Palomero have all qualified to compete.

Men

Athlete	Event	Swim (750 m)	Trans 1	Bike (20 km)	Trans 2	Run (5 km)	Total Time	Rank
Lionel Morales	Men's PTS2	11:47	2:12	34:09	1:14	20:59	1:07.45	6
Daniel Molina	Men's PTS3	11:22	1:23	34:51	1:03	19:26	1:08.05	1st place, gold medalist(s)
Diego Lardón	Men's PTS3	16:52	1:14	32:48	0:51	22:29	1:11.36	7
Alejandro Sánchez Palomero	Men's PTS4	11:48	1:12	32:50	0:36	19:38	1:06.04	10
Nil Riudavets	Men's PTS4	11:20	0:51	31:52	0:36	16:31	1:01.10	3rd place, bronze medalist(s)
Jairo Ruiz	Men's PTS5	12:05	1:24	31:16	0:31	18:14	1:03.30	9
Héctor Cátala Laparra; Pilot: Carlos Oliver Vives	Men's PTVI	13:44	0:58	DNF				
José Luis García; Pilot: Diego Méntrida Zamarra	Men's PTVI	12:41	1:17	29:54	0:54	18:31	1:03.17	9

Women

Athlete	Event	Swim (750 m)	Trans 1	Bike (20 km)	Trans 2	Run (5 km)	Total Time	Rank
Eva María Moral Pedrero	Women's PTWC	14:25	1:57	41:00	0:53	14:03	1:12.18	4
Rakel Mateo Uriarte	Women's PTS2	15:25	2:52	44:48	2:18	34:53	1:40.16	10
Marta Francés Gómez	Women's PTS4	14:03	1:16	36:41	0:52	22:18	1:15.10	2nd place, silver medalist(s)
Andrea Miguélez	Women's PTS5	13:04	1:09	35:39	0:44	21:44	1:12.20	5
Susana Rodríguez; Pilot: Sara Pérez Sala	Women's PTVI	12:20	1:02	31:01	0:42	19:14	1:04.19	1st place, gold medalist(s)

== Powerlifting ==
Loida Zabala Ollero has qualified to compete.

Athlete	Event	Attempts			Result	Rank
Athlete	Event	1	2	3	Result	Rank
Loida Zabala	Women's -50 kg	60	70	75	75	9

== Rowing ==
Athlete	Event	Heats		Repechage		Final	
Athlete	Event	Time	Rank	Time	Rank	Time	Rank
Javier Garcia Martinez	PR1 men's single sculls	10:13.44	4 R	9:38.50	3 FB	9:55.99	8
Josefa Benítez Guzmán; Daniel Díaz Alcaide; Saúl Peña Puente; Verónica Rodríguez; Leonor García Serrano (cox)	PR3 mixed coxed four	7:45.53	5 R	7:36.41	6 FB	7:43.10	9

Qualification Legend: FA=Final A (medal); FB=Final B (non-medal); R=Repechage

== Shooting ==
Spain entered one para-shooter's after achieved quota places for the following events by virtue of their best finishes at the 2022, 2023 and 2024 world cup, 2022 World Championships, 2023 World Championships, 2023 European Para Championships and 2024 European Championships, as long as they obtained a minimum qualifying score (MQS) by May 31, 2020.

Mixed

Athlete	Event	Qualification		Final	
Athlete	Event	Points	Rank	Points	Rank
Fernando Michelena Muguerza	R4 - Mixed 10m Air Rifle Standing SH2	628.4	19	Did not advance	
Fernando Michelena Muguerza	R5 - Mixed 10m Air Rifle Prone SH2	633.5	18	Did not advance	
Fernando Michelena Muguerza	R9 - Mixed 50m Rifle Prone SH2	620.7	10	Did not advance	
Juan Antonio Saavedra Reinaldo	R3 – 10 m air rifle prone SH1	673.3	2 Q	232.1	3rd place, bronze medalist(s)
Juan Antonio Saavedra Reinaldo	R6 - Mixed 50m Rifle Prone SH1	626.9	1 Q	206.5	4

== Swimming ==
Spain secured 34 quotas at the 2023 World Para Swimming Championships after finishing in the top two places in Paralympic class disciplines.

Men

Athlete	Event	Heats		Final	
Athlete	Event	Result	Rank	Result	Rank
Enrique Alhambra	100 m backstroke S13	1:02.56	6 Q	1:00.86	5
Enrique Alhambra	100m butterfly S13	57.65	4 Q	56.27	3rd place, bronze medalist(s)
Enrique Alhambra	50m freestyle S13	24.80	11	Did not advance	
José Ramón Cantero Elvira	50m freestyle S11	27.74	11	Did not advance	
José Ramón Cantero Elvira	100 m breaststroke SB11	1:23.11	9	Did not advance	
José Ramón Cantero Elvira	100m butterfly S11	1:11.55	8 Q	1:11.06	8
José Ramón Cantero Elvira	200m Individual Medley SM11	—N/a		2:39.04	7
Mikel Erdozáin	200m freestyle S2	6:32.13	12	Did not advance	
Mikel Erdozáin	50m backstroke S2	1:43.15	10	Did not advance	
Mikel Erdozáin	100 m backstroke S2	3:10.73	10	Did not advance	
Jian Wang Escanilla	200m Individual Medley SM9	2:22.47	6 Q	2:22.69	8
Daniel Ferrer	50m Freestyle S3	49.15	6 Q	46.58	5
Daniel Ferrer	200m Freestyle S3	3:57.09	9	Did not advance	
Daniel Ferrer	50 m backstroke S3	52.54	6 Q	53.09	6
Daniel Ferrer	50m Breaststroke SB2	DSQ		Did not advance	
Daniel Ferrer	150m Individual Medley SM3	3:21.66	7 Q	DSQ	
Juan Ferrón	400m Freestyle S13	4:31.68	11	Did not advance	
Juan Ferrón	100m butterfly S13	59.58	8 Q	59.77	7
Jacobo Garrido Brun	400 m freestyle S9	4:19.53	3 Q	4:16.49	5
Jacobo Garrido Brun	100m Butterfly S9	1:03.59	11	Did not advance	
Jacobo Garrido Brun	200m Individual Medley SM9	2:25.80	11	Did not advance	
Vicente Gil Ros	50 m breaststroke SB3	—N/a		53.06	6
Luis Huerta Poza	100 m breaststroke SB5	1:56.17	8 Q	1:53.97	8
Luis Huerta Poza	200m freestyle S5	2:46.54	7 Q	2:45.30	6
Luis Huerta Poza	100m freestyle S5	1:18.98	7 Q	1:19:05	7
David Levecq	50m freestyle S10	25.59	10	Did not advance	
David Levecq	100m freestyle S10	56.05	11	Did not advance	
David Levecq	100m butterfly S10	1:00.93	10	Did not advance	
Íñigo Llopis Sanz	100m Freestyle S8	1:01.42	13	Did not advance	
Íñigo Llopis Sanz	400m Freestyle S8	4:37.02	8 Q	4:37.29	8
Íñigo Llopis Sanz	100 m backstroke S8	1:06.53	1 Q	1:05.58	1st place, gold medalist(s)
Miguel Luque Ávila	50m Backstroke - S4	50.42	11	Did not advance	
Miguel Luque Ávila	50m Breaststroke SB3	—N/a		50.52	3rd place, bronze medalist(s)
Miguel Luque Ávila	150m Individual Medley SM4	2:54.13	7 Q	2:51.96	6
José Antonio Mari	50m Freestyle S9	26.83	15	Did not advance	
José Antonio Mari	100m Butterfly S9	1:03.09	10	Did not advance	
Carlos Martínez	100m Breaststroke SB8	1:17.25	13	Did not advance	
Carlos Martínez	200m Individual Medley SM8	2:32.34	12	Did not advance	
Miguel Navarro	50m Backstroke S1	—N/a		1:54.58	7
Miguel Navarro	100m Backstroke S1	—N/a		3:52.51	6
Antoni Ponce Bertrán	200m freestyle S5	2:36.76	3 Q	2:34.25	4
Antoni Ponce Bertrán	50m backstroke S5	38.52	8 Q	38.46	8
Antoni Ponce Bertrán	100m breaststroke SB5	1:30.45	1 Q	1:29.43	2nd place, silver medalist(s)
Antoni Ponce Bertrán	50m butterfly S5	40.69	12	Did not advance	
Iván Salguero	100m Freestyle S12	55.23	7 Q	54.65	8
Iván Salguero	400m Freestyle S13	4:19.83	7 Q	4:19.52	7
Iván Salguero	100m Breaststroke SB13	1:12.43	12	Did not advance	
Oscar Salguero Galisteo	100m Breaststroke SB8	1:11.64	3 Q	1:12.36	6
Dávid Sánchez Sierra	100m Backstroke S6	1:21.60	9	Did not advance	
Dávid Sánchez Sierra	50m Butterfly S6	32.58	5 Q	32.99	6
Dávid Sánchez Sierra	200m Individual Medley SM6	2:56.69	11	Did not advance	
Ariel Schrenck Martínez	50m Freestyle S9	26.01	6 Q	26.18	8
Ariel Schrenck Martínez	200m Individual Medley SM9	2:26.07	12	Did not advance	
Àlex Villarejo	100m Freestyle S12	58.49	14	Did not advance	
Àlex Villarejo	100m Backstroke S12	1:05.19	8 Q	1:05.55	8
Àlex Villarejo	100m Breaststroke SB13	1:13.74	15	Did not advance	

Women

Athlete	Event	Heats		Final	
Athlete	Event	Result	Rank	Result	Rank
Eva Coronado Tejeda	200m freestyle S14	2:16.85	10	Did not advance	
Eva Coronado Tejeda	100m butterfly S14	1:11.40	11	Did not advance	
María Delgado Nadal	100m butterfly S13	1:06.96 NR	8 Q	1:06.70 NR	6
María Delgado Nadal	100m Freestyle S12	1:02.93	4 Q	1:01.74	4
María Delgado Nadal	100m Backstroke S12	1:12.35	3 Q	1:11.33	3rd place, bronze medalist(s)
Anastasiya Dmytriv	100m freestyle S9	1:08.67	14	Did not advance	
Anastasiya Dmytriv	100 m breaststroke SB8	1:22.91	1 Q	1:19.75	1st place, gold medalist(s)
Anastasiya Dmytriv	100m butterfly S9	1:14.07	9	Did not advance	
Anastasiya Dmytriv	200 m individual medley SM9	2:41.81	4 Q	2:37.64	3rd place, bronze medalist(s)
Ariadna Edo Beltrán	100m butterfly S13	1:09.75	13	Did not advance	
Ariadna Edo Beltrán	200m Individual Medley SM13	2:40.49	10	Did not advance	
Ariadna Edo Beltrán	400m Freestyle S13	4:51.11	4 Q	4:48.93	4
Emma Feliú Martín	50m Freestyle S13	28.19	8 Q	27.99	7
Emma Feliú Martín	400m Freestyle S13	4:57.48	7 Q	4:49.20	5
Emma Feliú Martín	100m Backstroke S13	—N/a		1:12.74	7
Emma Feliú Martín	100m Breaststroke SB13	1:26.08	9	Did not advance	
Marta Fernández Infante	100 m freestyle S3	1:36.04	2 Q	1:30.04 ER	2nd place, silver medalist(s)
Marta Fernández Infante	50m Backstroke S3	58.63	3 Q	1:00.46	3rd place, bronze medalist(s)
Marta Fernández Infante	50m Breaststroke SB3	59.35	3 Q	58.63	3rd place, bronze medalist(s)
Marta Fernández Infante	50m Butterfly S5	DNS		Did not advance	
Berta García Grau	100m Breaststroke SB4	1:59.85	7 Q	1:57.99	6
Berta García Grau	50m Butterfly S5	55.52	10	Did not advance	
Berta García Grau	200m Individual Medley SM5	4:10.99	12	Did not advance	
Sarai Gascón Moreno	100m Freestyle S9	1:05.34	7 Q	1:04.55	6
Sarai Gascón Moreno	200 m individual medley SM9	2:43.14	9	Did not advance	
Beatriz Lérida Maldonado	400 m freestyle S9	5:01.26	11	Did not advance	
Beatriz Lérida Maldonado	100m Backstroke S9	1:12.65	4 Q	1:12.26	4
Núria Marquès	400 m freestyle S9	4:54.74	8 Q	4:48.39	4
Núria Marquès	200 m individual medley SM9	2:42.02	6 Q	2:34.19	2nd place, silver medalist(s)
Núria Marquès	100m Backstroke S9	1:11.37	3 Q	1:09.24	2nd place, silver medalist(s)
Núria Marquès	100m Breaststroke SB8	1:26.42	5 Q	1:26.58	6
Teresa Perales	100m backstroke S2	2:41.55 NR	6 Q	2:37.53 NR	5
Teresa Perales	100m freestyle S3	2:05.53 PR	6 Q	2:03.84 PR	5
Teresa Perales	50m backstroke S2	1:12.90	6 Q	1:10.95	3rd place, bronze medalist(s)
Marian Polo López	100m butterfly S13	1:08.55	11	Did not advance	
Marian Polo López	50m freestyle S13	27.93	4 Q	27.64	4
Marian Polo López	100m backstroke S13	—N/a		1:12.73	6
Marian Polo López	200m individual medley SM13	2:35.89	8 Q	2:35.37	8
Marian Polo López	100m Breaststroke SB13	1:20.75	5 Q	1:19.37	5
Nahia Zudaire Borrezo	400 m freestyle S8	5:12.66	6 Q	5:05.46	7
Nahia Zudaire Borrezo	100m Breaststroke SB7	1:36.91	4 Q	1:33.48	4
Nahia Zudaire Borrezo	200m Individual Medley SM8	2:52.57	6 Q	2:54.65	8

Mixed

Athlete	Event	Heats		Final	
Athlete	Event	Result	Rank	Result	Rank
Daniel Ferrer; David Sánchez Sierra; Marta Fernández Infante; Nahia Zudaire	Mixed 4x50 Freestyle relay	2:40.42	6 Q	2:35.53	6
Beatriz Lérida; Sarai Gascón Moreno; Miguel Luque; Antoni Ponce; Marta Fernández Infante	Mixed 4x50 medley relay - 20 points	2:49.10	6 Q	2:40.14	5
Núria Marquès Soto; Oscar Salguero Galisteo; Iñigo Llopis Sanz; Sarai Gascón Moreno; Anastasiya Dmytriv; José Antonio Mari	Mixed 4x100 medley relay - 34 points	4:34.42	3 Q	4:29.39	3rd place, bronze medalist(s)
Nahia Zudaire Borrezo; Ariel Schrenck Martínez; Sarai Gascón Moreno; Íñigo Llopis Sanz	Mixed 4x100 freestyle relay - 34 points	—N/a		4:10.99	7
José Ramón Cantero Elvira; María Delgado Nadal; Emma Feliú Martín; Enrique Alhambra	Mixed 4x100 freestyle relay - 49 points	—N/a		3:57.95	3rd place, bronze medalist(s)

== Table tennis ==
Spain entered ten athletes for the Paralympic games. All of them qualified through the allocations of the final ITTF world ranking.

Men

Athlete	Event	Round of 32	Round of 16	Quarterfinals	Semifinals	Final / BM	
Athlete	Event	Opposition Result	Opposition Result	Opposition Result	Opposition Result	Opposition Result	Rank
Miguel Angel Toledo	Individual C2	—N/a	Lamirault (FRA); L 1–3	Did not advance			=9
Iker Sastre	Individual C2	—N/a	Flores (CHI); L 1–3	Did not advance			=9
Roberto Eder Rodríguez	Individual C3	Ohgren (SWE); W 3–0	Bruechle (GER); L 0–3	Did not advance			=9
Francisco López Sayago	Individual C4	—N/a	Kim (KOR); L 0–3	Did not advance			=9
Álvaro Valera	Individual C6	—N/a	Huang (CHN); W 3–1	Seidenfeld (USA); L 0–3	Did not advance		=5
Jordi Morales	Individual C7	—N/a	Yan (CHN); L 1–3	Did not advance			=9
Alejandro Díaz Tirado	Individual C8	—N/a	Nikolenko (UKR); L 0–3	Did not advance			=9
Jorge Cardona	Individual C9	—N/a	Liu (CHN); W 3–1	Didier (FRA); L 1–3	Did not advance		=5
Ander Cepas	Individual C9	—N/a	Iwabuchi (JPN); W 3–1	Mai (UKR); W 3–0	Devos (BEL); L 0–3	Did not advance	3rd place, bronze medalist(s)
José Manuel Ruiz Reyes	Individual C10	—N/a	Echaveguren (CHI); L 1–3	Did not advance			=9

Doubles

Athlete	Event	Round of 16	Quarterfinals	Semifinals	Final / BM	
Athlete	Event	Opposition Result	Opposition Result	Opposition Result	Opposition Result	Rank
Miguel Ángel Toledo; Iker Sastre	Doubles MD4	—N/a	Lovas / Riapos (SVK); L 2–3	Did not advance		=5
Francisco López Sayago; Roberto Eder Rodríguez	Doubles MD8	Chaiwut / Glinbancheun (THA); L 0–3	Did not advance			=9
Álvaro Valera; Jordi Morales	Doubles MD14	Pino / Torres (CHI); L 0–3	Did not advance			=9
Jorge Cardona; Ander Cepas	Doubles MD18	Manara / Massad (BRA); L 1–3	Did not advance			=9
Alejandro Díaz Tirado; José Manuel Ruiz Reyes	Doubles MD18	Lian / Zhao (CHN); L 1–3	Did not advance			=9

== Taekwondo ==
Spain entered two athletes to compete at the Paralympics competition. Dalia Santiago Moreno qualified for the games by becoming one of six top ranked athletes in her division. Meanwhile, Joel Martín Villalobos qualified for Paris 2024, following the triumph of his gold medal results in men's 58 kg classes, at the 2024 European Qualification Tournament in Sofia, Bulgaria.

Athlete	Event	First round	Quarterfinals	Semifinals	Repechage	Final / BM	
Athlete	Event	Opposition Result	Opposition Result	Opposition Result	Opposition Result	Opposition Result	Rank
Joel Martín Villalobos	Men's –58 kg	Djabirou (NIG); W 30–13	Ozcan (TUR); L 17–22	—N/a	Tanaka (JPN); W 8–7	Xiao (TPE); L 8–16	5
Dalia Santiago Moreno	Women's +65 kg	Tapari (PNG); W 35–6	Menezes (BRA); L 15–17	—N/a	Papastamotopoulou (GRE); L 7–11	—N/a	7

== Wheelchair basketball ==
Spain men and Spain women have qualified to compete, respectively through the 2023 European Para Championships in Rotterdam; and 2024 IWBF Women's Repechage in Osaka, Japan.

Squad	Group stage				Quarterfinal	Semifinal	Final / BM	
Squad	Opposition Result	Opposition Result	Opposition Result	Rank	Opposition Result	Opposition Result	Opposition Result	Rank
Spain men's	United States; L 56–66	Australia; W 68–60	Netherlands; W 68–53	2 Q	Germany; L 49–57	5th-8th place match Australia; L 74–78	7th-8th place match France; W 72–57	7
Spain women's	Great Britain; L 34–69	China; L 38–64	Canada; L 49–81	4 Q	Netherlands; L 43–61	5th-8th place match Germany; L 45–51	7th-8th place match Japan; L 55–72	8

== Wheelchair fencing ==
Judith Rodríguez Menéndez has qualified to compete.

Athlete	Event	Round of 32	Round of 16	Quarterfinal	Semifinal	Repechage 1	Repechage 2	Repechage 3	Repechage 4	Final / BM	
Athlete	Event	Opposition Score	Opposition Score	Opposition Score	Opposition Score	Opposition Score	Opposition Score	Opposition Score	Opposition Score	Opposition Score	Rank
Judith Rodríguez Menéndez	Women's foil A	Bye	Fan (HKG); W 15–10	Mogos (ITA); W 15–12	Zou (CHN); L 12–15	—N/a			Krajnyak (HUN); W 15–10	Yu (HKG); W 15–11	3rd place, bronze medalist(s)
Judith Rodríguez Menéndez	Women's épée A	Bye	Delavoipiere (FRA); W 15–8	Chen (CHN); L 7–15	—N/a		Yu (HKG); L 11–15	Did not advance			10

== Wheelchair tennis ==
Daniel Caverzaschi, Martín de la Puente and Enrique Siscar have all qualified to compete.

Athlete	Event	Round of 64	Round of 32	Round of 16	Quarterfinals	Semifinals	Final / BM	
Athlete	Event	Opposition Result	Opposition Result	Opposition Result	Opposition Result	Opposition Result	Opposition Result	Rank
Daniel Caverzaschi	Men's singles	Bye	Im (KOR); W 4–6, 6–4, 7–6	Egberink (NED); L 6–7, 6–7	Did not advance			9
Martín de la Puente	Men's singles	Bye	Casco (ARG); W 6–2, 6–0	Scheffers (NED); W 6–2, 6–2	Houdet (FRA); W 6–2, 4–6, 6–1	Hewett (GBR); L 2–6, 0–6	González (ARG); L 1–6, 2–6	4
Enrique Siscar	Men's singles	Ji (CHN); L 1–6, 4–6	Did not advance					33
Daniel Caverzaschi; Martín de la Puente	Men's doubles	—N/a	Bye	Bin Yusuf / Borhan (MAS); W 6–2, 6–3	Egberink / Scheffers (NED); W 7–5, 1–6, [10–3]	Miki / Oda (JPN); L 7–5, 2–6, [8–10]	Houdet / Cattaneo (FRA); W 4–6, 6–4, [10–5]	3rd place, bronze medalist(s)

== See also ==
- Spain at the 2024 Summer Olympics
- Spain at the Paralympics
