= Cycling at the 2024 Summer Paralympics – Men's road time trial C1 =

Men's road time trial C1 at the XVII Paralympic Games
- Venue: Clichy-sous-Bois
- Dates: 4 September
- Competitors: 10 from 8 nations
- Winning time: 20:39.53

Medalists
1st place, gold medalist(s)		Ricardo Ten Argiles	Spain
2nd place, silver medalist(s)		Michael Teuber	Germany
3rd place, bronze medalist(s)		Zbigniew Maciejewski	Poland

The Men's time trial C1 road cycling event at the 2024 Summer Paralympics took place on 4 September 2024, at Clichy-sous-Bois, Paris. Ten riders competed in the event.

The C1 classification is for the following cyclists:

C1: severe hemiplegic or diplegic spasticity; severe athetosis or ataxia; bilateral through knee amputation, etc.

== Results ==
Rank	Rider	Nationality	Class	Time	Deficit
1st place, gold medalist(s)	Ricardo Ten Argiles	Spain	C1	20:39.53	
2nd place, silver medalist(s)	Michael Teuber	Germany	C1	21:18.14	+0:38.61
3rd place, bronze medalist(s)	Zbigniew Maciejewski	Poland	C1	21:18.94	+0:39.41
4	Pierre Senska	Germany	C1	21:58.34	+1:18.81
5	Mohamad Yusof Hafizi Shaharuddin	Malaysia	C1	22:27.91	+1:48.38
6	Liang Weicong	China	C1	23:01.23	+2:21.70
7	Carlos Alberto Gomes Soares	Brazil	C1	23:23.52	+2:43.99
8	Haytam el Amraouy	Morocco	C1	23:36.52	+2:56.99
9	Li Zhangyu	China	C1	24:50.93	+4:11.40
10	Rodrigo Fernando Lopez	Argentina	C1	25:07.69	+4:28.16
