= 2011 UCI Para-cycling Track World Championships – Men's 1 km time trial =

Rainbow jersey

The men's 1 km time trial was part of the 2011 UCI Para-cycling Track World Championships, held in Montichiari, Italy in March 2011.

== Medalists ==
Class	Gold	Silver	Bronze
C1	Rodrigo López; Argentina	Chris Jaco Nel; South Africa	Jaye Miley; Canada
C2	Gui Hua Liang; China	Andrew Panazzolo; Australia	Tobias Graf; Germany
C3	Darren Kenny; United Kingdom	Richard Waddon; United Kingdom	Amador Granados; Spain
C4	Jody Cundy; United Kingdom	Terry Byrne; United Kingdom	Jirí Bouška; Czech Republic
C5	Jon-Allan Butterworth; United Kingdom	Vincent Juarez; United States	Pablo Jaramillo Gallardo; Spain
B	Neil Fachie, Craig MacLean; United Kingdom	Anthony Kappes, Barney Storey; United Kingdom	José Enrique Porto Lareo, José Antonio Villanueva Trinidad; Spain

== C1 ==
The Final was held on 12 March.

- C1 – locomotor disability: Neurological, or amputation

=== Final ===
Rank	Name	Nation	Time
1st place, gold medalist(s)	Rodrigo Fernando Lopez	Argentina	1:19.991
2nd place, silver medalist(s)	Jaco Nel	South Africa	1:20.558
3rd place, bronze medalist(s)	Jaye Milley	Canada	1:23.275
4	Brayden McDougall	Canada	1:23.557
5	Juan José Méndez Fernandez	Spain	1:25.791
6	Pierre Senska	Germany	1:25.929
7	Erich Winkler	Germany	1:27.299
8	Andreas Zirkl	Austria	1:27.942
9	Sergei Ipatov	Russia	1:40.858

== C2 ==
The Final was held on 12 March.

- C2 – locomotor disability: Neurological, decrease in muscle strength, or amputation

=== Final ===
Rank	Name	Nation	Time
1st place, gold medalist(s)	Gui Hua Liang	China	1:16.497
2nd place, silver medalist(s)	Andrew Panazzolo	Australia	1:18.048
3rd place, bronze medalist(s)	Tobias Graf	Germany	1:18.640
4	Michal Stark	Czech Republic	1:19.466
5	Fabrizio Macchi	Italy	1:19.898
6	Colin Lynch	Ireland	1:20.761
7	Antonio Garcia Martinez	Spain	1:21.032
8	Xiao Ming Gao	China	1:21.691
9	Gijs van Butselaar	Netherlands	1:22.592
10	Michael Teuber	Germany	1:22.814
11	Stephen Hills	New Zealand	1:23.047
12	Arslan Gilmutdinov	Russia	1:23.980
13	Alvaro Galvis Becerra	Colombia	1:24.028
14	Maurice Far Eckhard Tió	Spain	1:24.502
15	Matthieu Parent	Canada	1:24.567
16	Roger Bolliger	Switzerland	1:25.376
17	Attila Olah	Romania	1:30.347
18	Vitorio Silvestre	Brazil	2:18.131

== C3 ==
The Final was held on 12 March.

- C3 – locomotor disability: Neurological, or amputation

=== Final ===
Rank	Name	Nation	Time
1st place, gold medalist(s)	Darren Kenny	United Kingdom	1:11.293
2nd place, silver medalist(s)	Richard Waddon	United Kingdom	1:11.733
3rd place, bronze medalist(s)	Amador Granados Alkorta	Spain	1:12.985
4	Shaun McKeown	United Kingdom	1:13.086
5	Masaki Fujita	Japan	1:14.087
6	Steffen Warias	Germany	1:16.034
7	William Chesebro	United States	1:16.495
8	Nathan Smith	New Zealand	1:17.065
9	Carmelo Sanchez Oviedo	Colombia	1:18.370
10	Roberto Bargna	Italy	1:18.513
11	Alexey Obydennov	Russia	1:18.821
12	Sven Boekhoven	Netherlands	1:18.930
13	Miroslav Dongres	Czech Republic	1:19.426
14	Zhang Lu	China	1:20.646
15	Tomas Kvasnicka	Czech Republic	1:20.946
16	Matej Benda	Czech Republic	1:21.308
17	Christopher Burns	Ireland	1:23.312
18	Vladislav Adanichkin	Russia	1:30.806

== C4 ==
The Final was held on 12 March.

- C4 – locomotor disability: Neurological, or amputation

=== Final ===
Rank	Name	Nation	Time
1st place, gold medalist(s)	Jody Cundy	United Kingdom	1:05.144 WR
2nd place, silver medalist(s)	Terry Byrne	United Kingdom	1:07.694
3rd place, bronze medalist(s)	Jiri Bouska	Czech Republic	1:09.601
4	Carol-Eduard Novak	Romania	1:09.962
5	Jiří Ježek	Czech Republic	1:10.244
6	Aaron Trent	United States	1:10.455
7	Masashi Ishii	Japan	1:10.892
8	Samuel Kavanagh	United States	1:10.938
9	Xiaofei Ji	China	1:11.185
10	Michele Pittacolo	Italy	1:12.228
11	Manfred Gattringer	Austria	1:12.774
12	Diego Germán Dueñas Gómez	Colombia	1:13.236
13	Yuan Chao Zheng	China	1:13.857
14	Haohua Huang	China	1:14.087
15	Eric Bourgault	Canada	1:14.771
16	Tino Kässner	Germany	1:15.176
17	Lubos Jirka	Czech Republic	1:15.481
18	Teun Kruijff	Netherlands	1:15.648
19	Stephan Herholdt	South Africa	1:15.935
20	Gianluca Fantoni	Italy	1:16.185
21	Janos Plekker	South Africa	1:16.371
22	Jamie Gemmell	New Zealand	1:16.626
23	Klaus Lungershausen	Germany	1:18.345
24	Vitaliy Malyshev	Russia	1:24.606
25	Vyacheslav Telelyukhin	Russia	1:29.709

== C5 ==
The Final was held on 12 March.

- C5 – locomotor disability: Neurological, or amputation

=== Final ===
Rank	Name	Nation	Time
1st place, gold medalist(s)	Jon-Allan Butterworth	United Kingdom	1:07.615 WR
2nd place, silver medalist(s)	Vincent Juarez	United States	1:08.872
3rd place, bronze medalist(s)	Pablo Jaramillo Gallardo	Spain	1:09.108
4	Alfonso Cabello Llamas	Spain	1:09.396
5	Xinyang Liu	China	1:09.623
6	Lauro Chaman	Brazil	1:09.631
7	Mario Hammer	Germany	1:09.931
8	Yegor Dementyev	Ukraine	1:10.228
9	Cathal Miller	Ireland	1:10.497
10	Wolfgang Sacher	Germany	1:10.665
11	Mark Briston	United Kingdom	1:10.680
12	Andrea Tarlao	Italy	1:11.964
13	Christopher Ross	New Zealand	1:12.304
14	Radim Pavlik	Czech Republic	1:12.356
15	Michael T. Gallagher	Australia	1:12.472
16	Benjamin Landier	France	1:12.535
17	Soelito Gohr	Brazil	1:12.692
18	Wolfgang Eibeck	Austria	1:12.722
19	Fabio Triboli	Italy	1:12.869
20	Joao Alberto Schwindt Filho	Brazil	1:13.631
21	Edwin Fabián Mátiz Ruiz	Colombia	1:13.758
22	Imre Torok	Romania	1:14.114
23	Pierpaolo Addesi	Italy	1:14.535
24	Takahiro Abe	Japan	1:15.004
25	Christoph Leiter	Germany	1:15.276
26	Bastiaan Gruppen	Netherlands	1:15.503
27	Ioannis Kalaitzakis	Greece	1:15.691
28	Martin Bruun Jacobsen	Denmark	1:18.424
29	Pavel Komotskiy	Russia	1:21.076
30	Anatolii Kolunov	Russia	1:25.482

== Tandem B ==
The Final was held on 11 March.

- Tandem B – visual impairment

=== Final ===
Rank	Name	Nation	Time
1st place, gold medalist(s)	Neil Fachie, Craig MacLean	United Kingdom	1:02.659
2nd place, silver medalist(s)	Anthony Kappes, Barney Storey	United Kingdom	1:02.681
3rd place, bronze medalist(s)	José Enrique Porto Lareo, José Antonio Villanueva Trinidad	Spain	1:04.350
4	Rinne Oost, Patrick Bos	Netherlands	1:05.158
5	Clark Rachfal, David Swanson	United States	1:05.418
6	Daniel Chalifour, Alexandre Cloutier	Canada	1:05.522
7	Michael Delaney, Con Collis	Ireland	1:05.552
8	Tatsuyuki Oshiro, Yasufumi Ito	Japan	1:05.617
9	Kieran Modra, Scott McPhee	Australia	1:05.775
10	Bryce Lindores, Sean Finning	Australia	1:05.975
11	Miguel Ángel Clemente Solano, Diego Javier Muñoz Sanchez	Spain	1:06.625
12	Richard Bonhof, Jeroen Lute	Netherlands	1:07.194
13	William Stanley, Doug Baron	Canada	1:07.312
14	Yannick Reich, Torsten Goliasch	Germany	1:07.750
15	Elicer Orjuela Prada, Manuel Javier Tunjano	Colombia	1:08.075
16	Damien Debeaupuits, Alexis Febvay	France	1:08.173
17	Alfred Stelleman, Timo Fransen	Netherlands	1:08.388
18	Brian Cowie, Luc Dionne	Canada	1:08.490
19	Andrew Fitzgerald, Damien Shaw	Ireland	1:09.062
20	Ivano Pizzi, Luca Pizzi	Italy	1:09.301
21	Olivier Donval, Olivier Derquenne	France	1:09.368
22	Przemyslaw Wegner, Arkadiusz Garczarek	Poland	1:09.543
23	Christos Stefanakis, Konstantinos Troulinos	Greece	1:09.546
24	Laurent Delez, Christophe Grenard	Switzerland	1:09.680
25	Marek Moflar, Jiri Chyba	Czech Republic	1:10.500
26	Emanuele Bersini, Daniele Riccardo	Italy	1:10.757
27	Ralf Arnold, Jan Ratzke	Germany	1:10.785
28	Ales Moravec, Pavel Buráň	Czech Republic	1:10.893
29	Alberto Lujan Nattkemper, Juan Martin Ferrari	Argentina	1:13.088
30	Pablo Reinaldo Astoreca, Osvaldo De Bona	Argentina	1:15.300
31	Nikolaos Manatakis, Nikolaos Koumpenakis	Greece	1:15.690

== See also ==
- 2011 UCI Track Cycling World Championships – Men's 1 km time trial
