= Cycling at the 2020 Summer Paralympics – Mixed team sprint C1–5 =

Mixed team sprint C1–5 at the XVI Paralympic Games
- Paralympic Cycling
- Venues: Izu Velodrome
- Date: 28 August 2021
- Competitors: 27 from 9 nations

Medalists
1st place, gold medalist(s)		Kadeena Cox; Jaco van Gass; Jody Cundy	Great Britain
2nd place, silver medalist(s)		Li Zhangyu; Wu Guoqing; Lai Shanzhang	China
3rd place, bronze medalist(s)		Ricardo Ten Argilés; Pablo Jaramillo Gallardo; Alfonso Cabello	Spain

The mixed team sprint C1–5 track cycling event at the 2020 Summer Paralympics took place at the Izu Velodrome, Japan. The C category is for cyclists with a physical impairment (muscle power or range of motion, and impairments affecting the coordination) that prevents them from competing in able-bodied competition but still competes using a standard bicycle. 27 cyclist from 9 different nations participated in this event. The distance for this event will be 750m.

== Competition format ==
27 cyclist from 9 nations, 3 cyclists per team, is to be competing in the event. The 3 cyclists in a team can be all male, all female, or male and female. The three cyclists must be chosen from any of the C category events (C1-5) and more than one cyclist can be chosen from the same category. The full distance of this event is 750m or 3 laps so this would mean that 1 cyclist has to do 250m or one lap. All three will be group together when on track with the first cycler at the front while the other two behind follow, after the first cycler has completed one lap, he gets off the track and the next one behind takes the lead and cycles another one lap with the last cycler following behind, after the second complete one lap and gets off, the last cycler takes the lead and finishes off doing another one lap.

The event would start with a qualifying round, where each team in their own individual heat (so 1 heat has 1 team) would race off on a time-trial basis. In this case, the 2 fastest teams would qualify for the gold medal match to race for the gold medal, while the 3rd and 4th fastest teams would go compete in the bronze medal match to race for the bronze medal.

== Schedule ==
All times are Japan Standard Time (UTC+9)

The mixed team sprint C1–5 will be take place on a single day.

Date	Time	Round
Saturday, 28 August 2021	10:32	Qualifying
Saturday, 28 August 2021	12:12	Finals

== Records ==
World record	Li Zhangyu, Wu Guoqing, Lai Shanzhang (CHN)	48.096	Milton, Canada	2 February 2020
Paralympic record	Louis Rolfe, Jon-Allan Butterworth, Jody Cundy (GBR)	48.635	Rio de Janeiro, Brazil	11 September 2016

== Results ==
=== Qualifying ===
Rank	Heat	Nation	Cyclists	Class	Gender	Result	Notes
1	9	China	Li Zhangyu	C1	M	48.051	QG, WR
1	9	China	Lai Shanzhang	C5	M	48.051	QG, WR
1	9	China	Wu Guoqing	C4	M	48.051	QG, WR
2	8	Great Britain	Kadeena Cox	C4	F	48.524	QG
2	8	Great Britain	Jaco van Gass	C3	M	48.524	QG
2	8	Great Britain	Jody Cundy	C4	M	48.524	QG
3	2	Spain	Ricardo Ten Argilés	C1	M	49.571	QB
3	2	Spain	Pablo Jaramillo Gallardo	C5	M	49.571	QB
3	2	Spain	Alfonso Cabello	C5	M	49.571	QB
4	5	France	Alexandre Léauté	C2	M	50.344	QB
4	5	France	Kévin Le Cunff	C5	M	50.344	QB
4	5	France	Dorian Foulon	C5	M	50.344	QB
5	6	Malaysia	Mohamad Yusof Hafizi Shaharuddin	C1	M	50.532	
5	6	Malaysia	Muhammad Hafiz Jamali	C5	M	50.532	
5	6	Malaysia	Zuhairie Ahmad Tarmizi	C5	M	50.532	
6	7	United States	Aaron Keith	C1	M	52.051	
6	7	United States	Joseph Berenyi	C3	M	52.051	
6	7	United States	Christopher Murphy	C5	M	52.051	
7	1	Colombia	Paula Ossa	C5	F	52.409	
7	1	Colombia	Alejandro Perea Arango	C3	M	52.409	
7	1	Colombia	Edwin Fabián Mátiz Ruiz	C5	M	52.409	
8	4	RPC	Alina Punina	C5	F	52.952	
8	4	RPC	Mikhail Astashov	C1	M	52.952	
8	4	RPC	Sergei Pudov	C4	M	52.952	
9	3	Australia	Meg Lemon	C4	F	56.989	
9	3	Australia	Amanda Reid	C2	F	56.989	
9	3	Australia	Gordon Allan	C2	M	56.989	

=== Final ===
Rank	Nation	Cyclists	Class	Gender	Result	Notes
Gold medal final
1st place, gold medalist(s)	Great Britain	Kadeena Cox	C4	F	47.579	WR
1st place, gold medalist(s)	Great Britain	Jaco van Gass	C3	M	47.579	WR
1st place, gold medalist(s)	Great Britain	Jody Cundy	C4	M	47.579	WR
2nd place, silver medalist(s)	China	Li Zhangyu	C1	M	47.685	
2nd place, silver medalist(s)	China	Wu Guoqing	C4	M	47.685	
2nd place, silver medalist(s)	China	Lai Shanzhang	C5	M	47.685	
Bronze medal final
3rd place, bronze medalist(s)	Spain	Ricardo Ten Argilés	C1	M	49.209	
3rd place, bronze medalist(s)	Spain	Pablo Jaramillo Gallardo	C5	M	49.209	
3rd place, bronze medalist(s)	Spain	Alfonso Cabello	C5	M	49.209	
4	France	Alexandre Léauté	C2	M	49.567	
4	France	Kévin Le Cunff	C5	M	49.567	
4	France	Dorian Foulon	C5	M	49.567	
