= Wu Guoqing (cyclist) =

Chinese Paralympic cyclist

Personal information
- Born: 28 February 1995 (age 31) China

Cycling career
- Sport: Cycling
- Discipline: Track
Medal record
Cycling
Representing China
Paralympic Games
Silver medal – second place	2020 Tokyo	Mixed team sprint C1–5
Track World Championships
Gold medal – first place	2019 Apeldoorn	Team sprint
Gold medal – first place	2020 Milton	Team sprint
Gold medal – first place	2023 Glasgow	Mixed team sprint C1–5
Silver medal – second place	2026 Apeldoorn	Sprint C4
Bronze medal – third place	2023 Glasgow	Time trial C4

Wu Guoqing (born 28 February 1995) is a Chinese cyclist.

== Career ==
He competed at the 2020 Summer Paralympics in the men's time trial C4–5 and mixed team sprint C1–5, winning a silver medal in the latter alongside Li Zhangyu and Lai Shanzhang. They had also won the gold medal at the 2019 and 2020 UCI Para-cycling Track World Championships in the same category.
