= Cycling at the 2024 Summer Paralympics – Men's time trial C1–3 =

Men's time trial C1–3 at the XVII Paralympic Games
- Venue: Vélodrome National, Saint-Quentin-en-Yvelines
- Dates: 31 August 2024
- Competitors: 17 from 14 nations
- Winning time: 1:03.480

Medalists
| 1st place, gold medalist(s) | | Li Zhangyu | China |
| 2nd place, silver medalist(s) | | Liang Weicong | China |
| 3rd place, bronze medalist(s) | | Alexandre Léauté | France |

The men's time trial class C1-3 track cycling event at the 2024 Summer Paralympics took place on 31 August 2024 at the Vélodrom National at Saint-Quentin-en-Yvelines. 17 cyclists from 14 nations competed in this event.

This combined class (C1-3) under classification C is for cyclists who have impairments that affect their legs, arms, and/or trunk but are still capable to use a standard bicycle:

- C1: severe hemiplegic or diplegic spasticity; severe athetosis or ataxia; bilateral through knee amputation, etc.
- C2: moderate hemiplegic or diplegic spasticity; moderate athetosis or ataxia; unilateral above knee amputation, etc.
- C3: moderate hemiplegic or diplegic spasticity; moderate athetosis or ataxia; bilateral below knee or unilateral through knee amputation, etc.

== Competition format ==
The competition immediately begins with the qualification round, where the 18 cyclists will individually in their own heat, compete by doing a time trial basis where the fastest two cyclist will qualify to compete for gold, the third and fourth fastest will qualify to compete for bronze. The distance of this event is 1000m.

A cyclist may have a different 'result time' than their real-time due to this event being a combined class event (C1-3), and some cyclists in their own class may have a disadvantage over other classes (for example due to speed), thus athlete factoring is used.

Despite this, different classifications have their own world and paralympic Games records.

== Records ==
Entering the event, the following World and paralympic records for the men's 1000m time trial were current:

| Class | Type | Name | Nationality | Mark | Location | Date77 | Notes |
|---|---|---|---|---|---|---|---|
| C1 | WR | Li Zhangyu | China | 1:08.347 | Tokyo | 27 August 2021 | |
| C2 | WR | Alexandre Léauté | France | 1:08.358 | Rio de Janeiro | 23 March 2024 | |
| C3 | WR | Devon Briggs | New Zealand | 1:05.259 | Rio de Janeiro | 23 March 2024 | |
| C1 | PR | Li Zhangyu | China | 1:08.347 | Tokyo | 27 August 2021 | |
| C2 | PR | Alexandre Leaute | France | 1:09.211 | Tokyo | 27 August 2021 | |
| C3 | PR | Jaco van Gass | Great Britain | 1:05.569 | Tokyo | 27 August 2021 | |

== Schedule ==
All times are Central European Summer Time (UTC+2)

| Date | Time | Round |
|---|---|---|
| 31 August | 10:19 | Qualifying |
| 31 August | 14:02 | Final |

== Results ==
=== Qualifying ===
The C1–3 individual pursuit is a multi-classification event. To ensure fairness, factoring is applied to the times of each cyclist based on their classification, and it is this factored time represents their result, both in qualification and, if that cyclist qualifies, the final In a men's C1-2-3 track event, the factor for a C1 rider is 92.01, for a C2 is 94.50 and for a C3 is 100.00. The result of the cyclist is calculated as a percentage of the elapsed time, with the factor providing the relevant percentage.

| Rank | Heat | Cyclist | Nation | Class | Real Time | Factor | Result | Notes |
|---|---|---|---|---|---|---|---|---|
| 1 | 7 | Li Zhangyu | China | C1 | 1:09.315 | 92.01 | 1:03.777 | Q |
| 2 | 8 | Alexandre Léauté | France | C2 | 1:08.020 WR | 94.50 | 1:04.279 | Q |
| 3 | 5 | Liang Weicong | China | C1 | 1:09.992 | 92.01 | 1:04.400 | Q |
| 4 | 9 | Jaco van Gass | Great Britain | C3 | 1:05.083 WR | 100.00 | 1:05.083 | Q |
| 5 | 8 | Gordon Allan | Australia | C2 | 1:09.403 | 94.50 | 1:05.586 | Q |
| 6 | 6 | Shota Kawamoto | Japan | C2 | 1:11.296 | 94.50 | 1:07.375 | Q |
| 7 | 9 | Devon Briggs | New Zealand | C3 | 1:08.505 | 100.00 | 1:08.505 | |
| 8 | 4 | Mohamad Shaharuddin | Malaysia | C1 | 1:15.521 | 92.01 | 1:09.487 | |
| 9 | 7 | Thomas Peyroton-Dartet | France | C3 | 1:10.784 | 100.00 | 1:10.784 | |
| 10 | 4 | Pierre Senska | Germany | C1 | 1:17.654 | 92.01 | 1:11.449 | |
| 11 | 6 | Muhammad Amizazahan | Malaysia | C3 | 1:13.780 | 100.00 | 1:13.780 | |
| 12 | 3 | Rodrigo Fernando López | Argentina | C1 | 1:20.223 | 92.01 | 1:13.813 | |
| 13 | 5 | Ricardo Ten Argilés | Spain | C1 | 1:21.208 | 92.01 | 1:14.719 | |
| 14 | 3 | Telmo Pinão | Portugal | C2 | 1:20.586 | 94.50 | 1:16.154 | |
| 15 | 2 | Golibbek Mirzoyarov | Uzbekistan | C2 | 1:20.596 | 94.50 | 1:16.163 | |
| 16 | 1 | Esteban Goddard | Panama | C2 | 1:24.776 | 94.50 | 1:20.113 | |
| 17 | 2 | Arshad Shaik | India | C2 | 1:26.154 | 94.50 | 1:21.416 | |

=== Final ===
| Rank | Cyclist | Nation | Class | Real Time | Factor | Result |
|---|---|---|---|---|---|---|
| 1st place, gold medalist(s) | Li Zhangyu | China | C1 | 1:08.993 | 92.01 | 1:03.480 |
| 2nd place, silver medalist(s) | Liang Weicong | China | C1 | 1:09.670 | 92.01 | 1:04.103 |
| 3rd place, bronze medalist(s) | Alexandre Léauté | France | C2 | 1:07.944 WR | 94.50 | 1:04.207 |
| 4 | Jaco van Gass | Great Britain | C3 | 1:04.825 WR | 100.00 | 1:04.825 |
| 5 | Gordon Allan | Australia | C2 | 1:09.803 | 94.50 | 1:05.964 |
| 6 | Shota Kawamoto | Japan | C2 | 1:11.597 | 94.50 | 1:07.659 |
