= Cycling at the 2024 Summer Paralympics – Men's pursuit C1 =

Men's individual pursuit C1 at the XVII Paralympic Games
- Venue: Vélodrome National
- Dates: 29 August 2024
- Competitors: 7 from 6 nations

Medalists
1st place, gold medalist(s)		Li Zhangyu	China
2nd place, silver medalist(s)		Liang Weicong	China
3rd place, bronze medalist(s)		Ricardo Ten Argilés	Spain

The men's individual pursuit class C1 track cycling event at the 2024 Summer Paralympics took place on 29 August 2024 at the Vélodrome National.

== Competition format ==
The C category is for cyclists with a physical impairment (muscle power or range of motion, and impairments affecting the coordination) that prevents them from competing in able-bodied competition but still competes using a standard bicycle.

The competition starts with a qualifying round where it comprises a head-to-head race between the 7 cyclists; The 2 fastest cyclists in the qualifying would qualify to the gold medal final while the 3rd and 4th fastest will qualify to the bronze medal final where they will race head-to-head. The distance of this event is 3000 etresm. The medal finals are also held on the same day as the qualifying.

== Schedule ==
All times are Central European Summer Time (UTC+2)

Date	Time	Round
29 August	12:22	Qualifying
29 August	16:07	Finals

== Results ==
=== Qualifying ===
Rank	Heat	Cyclist	Nation	Result	Notes
1	4	Li Zhangyu	China	3:31.338	QG, WR
2	3	Liang Weicong	China	3:42.468	QG
3	3	Ricardo Ten Argilés	Spain	3:43.765	QB
4	4	Pierre Senska	Germany	3:45.973	QB
5	2	Mohamad Shaharuddin	Malaysia	3:55.254	
6	2	Rodrigo Fernando López	Argentina	4:12.201	
7	1	Carlos Alberto Gomes Soares	Brazil	4:18.908	

=== Finals ===
Rank	Cyclists	Nation	Result	Notes
Gold medal final
1st place, gold medalist(s)	Li Zhangyu	China		
2nd place, silver medalist(s)	Liang Weicong	China	OVL	
Bronze medal final
3rd place, bronze medalist(s)	Ricardo Ten Argilés	Spain	3:45.152	
4	Pierre Senska	Germany	3:50.926	
