= 2023 UCI Para-cycling Track World Championships =

- Venue: Glasgow, United Kingdom
- Date(s): 2–8 August
- Velodrome: Sir Chris Hoy Velodrome
- Events: 48

The 2023 UCI Para-cycling Track World Championships were held from 2 to 8 August 2023, at the Sir Chris Hoy Velodrome in Glasgow, United Kingdom. It was held as part of the inaugural UCI Cycling World Championships. The event was held as part of an integrated programme with the 2023 UCI Track Cycling World Championships, which began, and will end, a day later.

== Results ==
=== Men ===
Event	Class	Gold		Silver		Bronze	
Sprint	B	Great Britain; Neil Fachie; Matt Rotherham (pilot)		Germany; Thomas Ulbricht; Robert Förstemann (pilot)		France; Raphaël Beaugillet; Quentin Caleyron (pilot)	
1 km time trial	C1	Sam Ruddock; Great Britain	1:12.210	Liang Weicong; China	1:12.529	Li Zhangyu; China	1:13.032
1 km time trial	C2	Alexandre Léauté; France	1:09.947	Shota Kawamoto; Japan	1:10.700	Gordon Allan; Australia	1:11.445
1 km time trial	C3	Jaco van Gass; Great Britain	1:06.187	Finlay Graham; Great Britain	1:06.450	Devon Briggs; New Zealand	1:06.831
1 km time trial	C4	Jody Cundy; Great Britain	1:03.468	Michael Shippley; Australia	1:04.813	Wu Guoqing; China	1:05.808
1 km time trial	C5	Blaine Hunt; Great Britain	1:03.341	Christopher Murphy; United States	1:04.766	Niels Verschaeren; Belgium	1:05.346
1 km time trial	B	Great Britain; Neil Fachie; Matt Rotherham (pilot)	1:00.287	Great Britain; James Ball; Steffan Lloyd (pilot)	1:00.329	Germany; Thomas Ulbricht; Robert Förstemann (pilot)	1:01.170
Individual pursuit	C1	Li Zhangyu; China	3:42.605	Ricardo Ten Argilés; Spain	3:43.413	Liang Weicong; China	3:48.720
Individual pursuit	C2	Alexandre Léauté; France		Darren Hicks; Australia	OVL	Shota Kawamoto; Japan	
Individual pursuit	C3	Finlay Graham; Great Britain	3:19.946	Jaco Van Gass; Great Britain	3:25.053	Devon Briggs; New Zealand	3:27.293
Individual pursuit	C4	Kévin Le Cunff; France	4:31.117	Jozef Metelka; Slovakia	4:35.227	Ronan Grimes; Ireland	4:34.015
Individual pursuit	C5	Yehor Dementyev; Ukraine	4:26.885	Martin van de Pol; Netherlands	4:31.498	Dorian Foulon; France	4:28.321
Individual pursuit	B	Netherlands; Tristan Bangma; Patrick Bos (pilot)		France; Alexandre Lloveras; Louis Pijourlet (pilot)	OVL	Great Britain; Stephen Bate; Christopher Latham (pilot)	4:05.734
Scratch race	C1	Ricardo Ten Argilés; Spain		Pierre Senska; Germany		Aaron Keith; United States	
Scratch race	C2	Florian Chapeau; France		Maurice Eckhard; Spain		Alexandre Léauté; France	
Scratch race	C3	Jaco van Gass; Great Britain		Finlay Graham; Great Britain		Devon Briggs; New Zealand	
Scratch race	C4	Archie Atkinson; Great Britain		Benjamin Westenberg; New Zealand		Ronan Grimes; Ireland	
Scratch race	C5	Daniel Abraham Gebru; Netherlands		Yehor Dementyev; Ukraine		Lauro Chaman; Brazil	
Omnium	C1	Ricardo Ten Argilés; Spain	152 pts	Liang Weicong; China	150 pts	Sam Ruddock; Great Britain	148 pts
Omnium	C2	Alexandre Léauté; France	156 pts	Shota Kawamoto; Japan	132 pts	Florian Chapeau; France	128 pts
Omnium	C3	Jaco van Gass; Great Britain	156 pts	Finlay Graham; Great Britain	152 pts	Devon Briggs; New Zealand	148 pts
Omnium	C4	Kévin Le Cunff; France	136 pts	Jozef Metelka; Slovakia	136 pts	Benjamin Westenberg; New Zealand	132 pts
Omnium	C5	Yehor Dementyev; Ukraine	138 pts	Franz-Josef Lässer; Austria	130 pts	Lauro Chaman; Brazil	128 pts

=== Women ===
Event	Class	Gold		Silver		Bronze	
Sprint	B	Great Britain; Sophie Unwin; Jenny Holl (pilot)		Australia; Jessica Gallagher; Caitlin Ward (pilot)		United States; Hannah Chadwick; Skyler Espinoza (pilot)	
500 m time trial	C1	Qian Wangwei; China	41.113 WR	Frances Brown; Great Britain	43.445	Yang Jiafan; China	46.153
500 m time trial	C2	Amanda Reid; Australia	38.378	Song Zhenling; China	42.318	Maike Hausberger; Germany	42.804
500 m time trial	C3	Keiko Sugiura; Japan	39.184	Aniek van den Aarssen; Netherlands	40.086	Mel Pemble; Canada	41.404
500 m time trial	C4	Kadeena Cox; Great Britain	35.961	Kate O'Brien; Canada	38.136	Erin Normoyle; Australia	38.297
500 m time trial	C5	Caroline Groot; Netherlands	37.252	Marie Patouillet; France	37.367	Nicole Murray; New Zealand	37.891
1 km time trial	B	Great Britain; Sophie Unwin; Jenny Holl (pilot)	1:08.302	Australia; Jessica Gallagher; Caitlin Ward (pilot)	1:08.362	Great Britain; Elizabeth Jordan; Amy Cole (pilot)	1:08.429
Individual pursuit	C1	Frances Brown; Great Britain	4:10.941 WR	Qian Wangwei; China	4:17.074	Yang Jiafan; China	4:43.109
Individual pursuit	C2	Flurina Rigling; Switzerland	3:52.887	Daphne Schrager; Great Britain	3:56.189	Amanda Reid; Australia	4:06.494
Individual pursuit	C3	Keiko Sugiura; Japan	3:56.949	Aniek van den Aarssen; Netherlands	4:03.328	Paige Greco; Australia	3:56.929
Individual pursuit	C4	Emily Petricola; Australia	3:42.732	Keely Shaw; Canada	3:50.004	Samantha Bosco; United States	3:48.602
Individual pursuit	C5	Heïdi Gaugain; France	3:39.966	Nicole Murray; New Zealand	3:41.734	Claudia Cretti; Italy	3:43.269
Individual pursuit	B	Great Britain; Sophie Unwin; Jenny Holl (pilot)	3:22.513	Great Britain; Lora Fachie; Corrine Hall (pilot)	3:25.216	Ireland; Katie-George Dunlevy; Eve McCrystal (pilot)	3:28.792
Scratch race	C1	Frances Brown; Great Britain		Qian Wangwei; China		Yang Jiafan; China	
Scratch race	C2	Maike Hausberger; Germany		Amanda Reid; Australia		Flurina Rigling; Switzerland	
Scratch race	C3	Wang Xiaomei; China		Mel Pemble; Canada		Richael Timothy; Ireland	
Scratch race	C4	Li Xiaohui; China		Franziska Matile-Dörig; Switzerland		Samantha Bosco; United States	
Scratch race	C5	Alana Forster; Australia		Claudia Cretti; Italy		Paula Ossa; Colombia	
Omnium	C1	Frances Brown; Great Britain	156 pts	Qian Wangwei; China	156 pts	Yang Jiafan; China	144 pts
Omnium	C2	Amanda Reid; Australia	152 pts	Flurina Rigling; Switzerland	148 pts	Maike Hausberger; Germany	140pts
Omnium	C3	Mel Pemble; Canada	154 pts	Aniek van den Aarssen; Netherlands	154 pts	Richael Timothy; Ireland	148 pts
Omnium	C4	Anna Taylor; New Zealand	148 pts	Samantha Bosco; United States	144 pts	Franziska Matile-Dörig; Switzerland	142 pts
Omnium	C5	Nicole Murray; New Zealand	146 pts	Claudia Cretti; Italy	144 pts	Marie Patouillet; France	144 pts

=== Mixed ===
Event	Class	Gold		Silver		Bronze	
Team sprint	B	Great Britain; Elizabeth Jordan; Amy Cole (pilot); Neil Fachie; Matt Rotherham (pilot)	49.992	Italy; Chiara Colombo; Elena Bissolati (pilot); Stefano Meroni; Francesco Ceci (pilot)	51.264	Malaysia; Nur Suraiya Muhamad Zamri; Farina Shawat Mohd Adnan (pilot); Mohd Khairul Hazwan Wahab; Muhammad Khairul Adha Rasol (pilot)	51.393
Team sprint	C1–5	China; Lai Shanzhang; Li Zhangyu; Wu Guoqing; Tan Zeqiang	47.914	Great Britain; Kadeena Cox; Jody Cundy; Jaco van Gass	48.251	Spain; Alfonso Cabello; Pablo Jaramillo Gallardo; Ricardo Ten Argilés	49.579

== Medal table ==
The event was dominated by the hosts, Great Britain who won 18 gold medals, and 30 medals in total. Their success was founded on dominance of both the men's sprint time trial events and the tandem events for blind cyclists. Despite this, 12 nations tasted gold medal success and 21 nations reached the podium.

* Host nation (Great Britain)

Rank	Nation	Gold	Silver	Bronze	Total
1	Great Britain*	18	9	3	30
2	France	7	2	5	14
3	China	5	6	7	18
4	Australia	4	5	4	13
5	Netherlands	3	4	0	7
6	New Zealand	2	2	6	10
7	Japan	2	2	1	5
7	Spain	2	2	1	5
9	Ukraine	2	1	0	3
10	Canada	1	3	1	5
11	Germany	1	2	3	6
12	Switzerland	1	2	2	5
13	Italy	0	3	1	4
14	United States	0	2	4	6
15	Slovakia	0	2	0	2
16	Austria	0	1	0	1
17	Ireland	0	0	5	5
18	Brazil	0	0	2	2
19	Belgium	0	0	1	1
19	Colombia	0	0	1	1
19	Malaysia	0	0	1	1
Totals (21 entries)		48	48	48	144
