= Cycling at the 2024 Summer Paralympics – Men's time trial C4–5 =

Men's time trial C4–5 at the XVII Paralympic Games
- Venue: Vélodrome National, Saint-Quentin-en-Yvelines
- Dates: 30 August 2024
- Competitors: 23 from 18 nations
- Winning time: 1:01.650

Medalists
| 1st place, gold medalist(s) | | Korey Boddington | Australia |
| 2nd place, silver medalist(s) | | Blaine Hunt | Great Britain |
| 3rd place, bronze medalist(s) | | Alfonso Cabello | Spain |

The men's time trial class C4-5 track cycling event at the 2024 Summer Paralympics took place on 30 August 2024 at the Vélodrom National at Saint-Quentin-en-Yvelines . This combine class (C4-5) under classification C is for cyclists who have impairments that affect their legs, arms, and/or trunk but are still capable to use a standard bicycle. 24 cyclists from 19 nations compete in this event.

== Competition format ==
The competition immediately begins with the qualification round, where the 24 cyclists will individually in their own heat, compete by doing a time trial basis where the fastest six cyclist will qualify to compete for gold, silver and bronze. The distance of this event is 1000m.

A cyclist may have a different 'result time' than their real-time due to this event being a combined class event (C4-5), and some cyclists in their own class may have a disadvantage over other classes (for example due to speed), thus athlete factoring is used.

Despite this, different classifications have their own world and paralympic Games records

== Schedule ==
All times are Central European Summer Time (UTC+2)

| Date | Time | Round |
|---|---|---|
| 30 August | 11:30 | Qualifying |
| 30 August | 14:52 | Final |

== Results ==
=== Qualifying ===
The C4–5 1000 m time trial is a multi-classification event. To ensure fairness, factoring is applied to the times of each cyclist based on their classification, and it is this factored time represents their result, both in qualification and, if that cyclist qualifies, the final. In a men's C4-5 track event, the factor for a C4 rider is 98.66 and for a C5 is 100.00. The result of the cyclist is calculated as a percentage of the elapsed time, with the factor providing the relevant percentage.

| Rank | Heat | Cyclist | Nation | Class | Real Time | Factor | Result | Notes |
|---|---|---|---|---|---|---|---|---|
| 1 | 12 | Korey Boddington | Australia | C4 | 1:02.021 PR | 98.66 | 1:01.190 | Q |
| 2 | 11 | Blaine Hunt | Great Britain | C5 | 1:02.005 | 100.00 | 1:02.005 | Q |
| 3 | 12 | Alfonso Cabello | Spain | C5 | 1:02.050 | 100.00 | 1:02.050 | Q |
| 4 | 10 | Jody Cundy | Great Britain | C4 | 1:03.231 | 98.66 | 1:02.384 | Q |
| 5 | 9 | Archie Atkinson | Great Britain | C4 | 1:04.371 | 98.66 | 1:03.508 | Q |
| 6 | 7 | Jozef Metelka | Slovakia | C4 | 1:05.826 | 98.66 | 1:04.944 | Q |
| 7 | 6 | Carol-Eduard Novak | Romania | C4 | 1:06.039 | 98.66 | 1:05.154 | |
| 8 | 3 | Ronan Grimes | Ireland | C4 | 1:06.411 | 98.66 | 1:05.521 | |
| 9 | 8 | Edwin Fabián Mátiz Ruiz | Colombia | C5 | 1:05.703 | 100.00 | 1:05.703 | |
| 10 | 5 | Zsombor Wermeser | Hungary | C5 | 1:05.912 | 100.00 | 1:05.912 | |
| 11 | 11 | Dorian Foulon | France | C5 | 1:06.392 | 100.00 | 1:06.392 | |
| 12 | 10 | Franz-Josef Lässer | Austria | C5 | 1:06.463 | 100.00 | 1:06.463 | |
| 13 | 4 | P. Jaramillo Gallardo | Spain | C5 | 1:06.634 | 100.00 | 1:06.634 | |
| 14 | 6 | Bryan Larsen | United States | C4 | 1:08.158 | 98.66 | 1:07.245 | |
| 15 | 4 | Elouan Gardon | United States | C5 | 1:08.006 | 100.00 | 1:08.006 | |
| 16 | 7 | Yehor Dementyev | Ukraine | C5 | 1:08.043 | 100.00 | 1:08.043 | |
| 17 | 2 | Hernán Moya | Chile | C5 | 1:08.476 | 100.00 | 1:08.476 | |
| 18 | 3 | Timothy Zemp | Switzerland | C4 | 1:09.991 | 98.66 | 1:09.053 | |
| 19 | 8 | Gatien Le Rousseau | France | C4 | 1:10.830 | 98.66 | 1:09.881 | |
| 20 | 5 | Lauro Chaman | Brazil | C5 | 1:10.393 | 100.00 | 1:10.393 | |
| 21 | 2 | Azimbek Abdullaev | Uzbekistan | C5 | 1:10.826 | 100.00 | 1:10.826 | |
| 22 | 1 | Ahmed Al-Bedwawi | United Arab Emirates | C5 | 1:13.100 | 100.00 | 1:13.100 | |
| 23 | 1 | Oskars Gailišs | Latvia | C4 | 1:15.167 | 98.66 | 1:14.160 | |

=== Final ===
| Rank | Cyclist | Nation | Class | Real Time | Factor | Result |
|---|---|---|---|---|---|---|
| 1st place, gold medalist(s) | Korey Boddington | Australia | C4 | 1:02.487 | 98.66 | 1:01.650 |
| 2nd place, silver medalist(s) | Blaine Hunt | Great Britain | C5 | 1:01.776 | 100.00 | 1:01.776 |
| 3rd place, bronze medalist(s) | Alfonso Cabello | Spain | C5 | 1:01.969 | 100.00 | 1:01.969 |
| 4 | Jody Cundy | Great Britain | C4 | 1:03.353 | 98.66 | 1:02.504 |
| 5 | Archie Atkinson | Great Britain | C4 | 1:04.401 | 98.66 | 1:03.538 |
| 6 | Jozef Metelka | Slovakia | C4 | 1:08.861 | 98.66 | 1:07.938 |
