= Cycling at the 2012 Summer Paralympics – Men's individual pursuit C5 =

Cycling, Men's Ind. Pursuit C5 at the XIV Paralympic Games
- Venue: ExCeL Exhibition Centre
- Dates: 1 September
- Competitors: 12 from 11 nations

Medalists
1st place, gold medalist(s)		Michael Gallagher	Australia
2nd place, silver medalist(s)		Jon-Allan Butterworth	Great Britain
3rd place, bronze medalist(s)		Liu Xinyang	China

The Men's Individual Pursuit C5 track cycling event at the 2012 Summer Paralympics took place on 1 September at London Velopark. The race distance was 4 km.

== Preliminaries ==
Q = Qualifier WR = World Record

Rank	Name	Country	Time
1	Michael Gallagher	Australia	4:30.012 Q WR
2	Jon-Allan Butterworth	Great Britain	4:35.026 Q
3	Liu Xinyang	China	4:35.386 Q
4	Yegor Dementyev	Ukraine	4:43.881 Q
5	Andrea Tarlao	Italy	4:44.120
6	Joao Alberto Schwindt Filho	Brazil	4:46.553
7	Wolfgang Eibeck	Austria	4:46.999
8	Cathal Miller	Ireland	4:49.237
9	Wolfgang Sacher	Germany	4:51.305
10	Rodny Minier	Dominican Republic	4:55.352
11	Soelito Gohr	Brazil	4:58.061
12	Chris Ross	New Zealand	5:04.669

== Finals ==
Gold medal match

Name	Time	Rank
Michael Gallagher (AUS)	4:35.297	1st place, gold medalist(s)
Jon-Allan Butterworth (GBR)	4:39.586	2nd place, silver medalist(s)

Bronze medal match

Name	Time	Rank
Liu Xinyang (CHN)	4:38.443	3rd place, bronze medalist(s)
Yegor Dementyev (UKR)	4:43.683	4
