= Blaine Hunt =

British para-cyclist

Personal information
- Nationality: British
- Born: 18 December 1988 (age 37)

Sport
- Sport: Para-cycling
- Disability class: C5
Medal record
Men's para-cycling
Representing Great Britain
Paralympic Games
Silver medal – second place	2024 Paris	Time trial C4–5
Track World Championships
Gold medal – first place	2022 Saint-Quentin-en-Yvelines	Time trial C5
Gold medal – first place	2023 Glasgow	Time trial C5
Gold medal – first place	2024 Rio de Janeiro	Time trial C5
Silver medal – second place	2019 Apeldoorn	Time trial C5
Silver medal – second place	2024 Rio de Janeiro	Mixed team sprint C1–5
Silver medal – second place	2025 Rio de Janeiro	Time trial C5
Bronze medal – third place	2018 Rio de Janeiro	Time trial C5
Bronze medal – third place	2024 Rio de Janeiro	Omnium C5

Blaine Hunt (born 18 December 1988) is a British para-cyclist, who won silver in the time trial C4–5 at the 2024 Summer Paralympics in Paris.

== Early life ==
Following a rugby injury at the age of 15, Hunt required reconstructive surgery. During surgery the drill jig slipped and severed his popliteal artery. Following 2 blood transfusions and 8 hours of surgery Blaine developed compartment syndrome. There is a small window of opportunity to perform a fasciotomy when a patient develops compartment syndrome. Unfortunately Blaine was left untreated for some time. This led to nerve damage and muscle wastage in his lower right leg. Blaine has limited range of motion in his ankle joint, lack of sensation in his lower right leg, poor venous return, 0% function in his peroneal nerve amongst other issues which make him eligible for para sport.

== Cycling career ==
Blaine Hunt is the current World Record holder for the C5 flying 200 m, the national record holder for the C5 1 km time trial, and the national record holder for the C5 4 km individual pursuit.
