= Zbigniew Maciejewski =

Polish Para-cyclist (born 1973)

Personal information
- Nationality: Polish
- Born: 22 January 1973 (age 53)
- Home town: Warsaw, Poland

Sport
- Sport: Para-cycling
- Disability class: C1
Medal record
Men's para-cycling
Representing Poland
Paralympic Games
Bronze medal – third place	2024 Paris	Road time trial C1
Road World Championships
Silver medal – second place	2024 Zurich	Time trial C1
Silver medal – second place	2024 Zurich	Road race C1
Silver medal – second place	2025 Ronse	Time trial C1

Zbigniew Maciejewski (born 22 January 1973) is a Polish Para-cyclist. He represented Poland at the 2024 Summer Paralympics.

== Career ==
Maciejewski represented Poland at the 2024 Summer Paralympics and won a bronze medal in the road time trial C1 event.
