= Cycling at the 2024 Summer Paralympics – Mixed team sprint C1–5 =

Mixed team sprint C1–5 at the XVII Paralympic Games
- Paralympic Cycling
- Venues: Vélodrome National
- Date: 1 September 2024
- Competitors: 21 from 7 nations
- Winning time: 47.738

Medalists
1st place, gold medalist(s)		Kadeena Cox; Jaco van Gass; Jody Cundy	Great Britain
2nd place, silver medalist(s)		Ricardo Ten Argiles; Pablo Jaramillo Gallardo; Alfonso Cabello Llamas	Spain
3rd place, bronze medalist(s)		Gordon Allan; Alistair Donohoe; Korey Boddington	Australia

The mixed team sprint C1–5 track cycling event at the 2024 Summer Paralympics will take place at the Vélodrome National, Paris. The C category is for cyclists with a physical impairment (muscle power or range of motion, and impairments affecting the coordination) that prevents them from competing in able-bodied competition but still competes using a standard bicycle.

21 cyclist from 7 different nations will participate in this event. The distance for this event will be 750m.

== Competition format ==
21 cyclist from 7 nations, 3 cyclists per team, compete in the event. The 3 cyclists in a team can be all male, all female, or male and female. The three cyclists must be chosen from any of the C category events (C1-5) and more than one cyclist can be chosen from the same category. The full distance of this event is 750m or 3 laps. The first cyclist must complete 250m or one lap, after which he or she gets off the track and the second rider takes the lead and cycles another one lap before coming off, with the last cyclist following behind finishing the race alone.

The event starts with a qualifying round, where each team in their own individual heat. the 2 fastest teams would qualify for the gold medal match to race for the gold medal, while the 3rd and 4th fastest teams compete in the bronze medal match to race for the bronze medal.

== Schedule ==
All times are Central European Summer Time (UTC+2)

The mixed team sprint C1–5 will be take place on a single day. As is now traditional, it will be the final Paralympic Games race on the track.

Date	Time	Round
1 September	12:55	Qualifying
1 September	15:30	Finals

== Results ==
=== Qualifying ===
Rank	Heat	Nation	Cyclists	Class	Gender	Result	Notes
1	6	Great Britain	Kadeena Cox	C4	F	48.493	QG
1	6	Great Britain	Jaco van Gass;	C3	M	48.493	QG
1	6	Great Britain	Jody Cundy	C5	M	48.493	QG
2	3	Spain	Alfonso Cabello	C5	M	49.466	QG
2	3	Spain	Pablo Jaramillo Gallardo	C5	M	49.466	QG
2	3	Spain	Ricardo Ten Argilés	C1	M	49.466	QG
3	5	Australia	Gordon Allan	C2	M	49.969	QB
3	5	Australia	Korey Boddington	C4	M	49.969	QB
3	5	Australia	Alistair Donohoe	C5	M	49.969	QB
4	4	France	Gatien le Rousseau	C4	M	50.004	QB
4	4	France	Kevin le Cunffe	C4	M	50.004	QB
4	4	France	Alexandre Leaute	C2	M	50.004	QB
5	2	Colombia	Daniela Munévar	C2	F	55.621	
5	2	Colombia	Carlos Vargas	C5	M	55.621	
5	2	Colombia	Edwin Fabián Mátiz Ruiz	C5	M	55.621	
6	1	Switzerland	Franziska Matile-Dörig	C4	F	57.746	
6	1	Switzerland	Flurina Rigling	C2	F	57.746	
6	1	Switzerland	Timothy Zemp	C4	M	57.746	
-	-	Japan	Masaki Fujita	C3	M	DNS	
-	-	Japan	Shota Kawamoto	C2	M	DNS	
-	-	Japan	Keiko Sugiura	C3	F	DNS	

=== Final ===
Rank	Nation	Cyclists	Class	Gender	Result	Notes
For gold.
1st place, gold medalist(s)	Great Britain	Kadeena Cox	C4	F	47.738	QG
1st place, gold medalist(s)	Great Britain	Jaco van Gass;	C3	M	47.738	QG
1st place, gold medalist(s)	Great Britain	Jody Cundy	C5	M	47.738	QG
2nd place, silver medalist(s)	Spain	Alfonso Cabello	C5	M	49.564	QG
2nd place, silver medalist(s)	Spain	Pablo Jaramillo Gallardo	C5	M	49.564	QG
2nd place, silver medalist(s)	Spain	Ricardo Ten Argilés	C1	M	49.564	QG
For bronze.
3rd place, bronze medalist(s)	Australia	Gordon Allan	C2	M	49.036	QB
3rd place, bronze medalist(s)	Australia	Korey Boddington	C4	M	49.036	QB
3rd place, bronze medalist(s)	Australia	Alistair Donohoe	C5	M	49.036	QB
4	France	Gatien le Rousseau	C4	M	49.961	QB
4	France	Kevin le Cunffe	C4	M	49.961	QB
4	France	Alexandre Leaute	C2	M	49.961	QB
