= Cycling at the 2012 Summer Paralympics – Men's 1 km time trial C4–5 =

Cycling, Men's 1 km time trial C4-5 at the XIV Paralympic Games
- Venue: ExCeL Exhibition Centre
- Dates: 31 August 2012
- Competitors: 22 from 17 nations
- Winning time: 1:05.947

Medalists
1st place, gold medalist(s)		Alfonso Cabello	Spain
2nd place, silver medalist(s)		Jon-Allan Butterworth	Great Britain
3rd place, bronze medalist(s)		Liu Xinyang	China

The Men's 1 km time trial, Classes 4-5 track cycling event at the 2012 Summer Paralympics took place on 31 August at London Velopark.

== Results ==
WR = World record, DNF = Did not finish

Rank	Name	Country	Class	Factored Time
1st place, gold medalist(s)	Alfonso Cabello	Spain	C5	1:05.947 WR
2nd place, silver medalist(s)	Jon-Allan Butterworth	Great Britain	C5	1:05.985
3rd place, bronze medalist(s)	Liu Xinyang	China	C5	1:07.638
4	Ji Xiaofei	China	C4	1:08.860
5	Jiri Bouska	Czech Republic	C4	1:08.974
6	Masashi Ishii	Japan	C4	1:09.241
7	Carol-Eduard Novak	Romania	C4	1:09.390
8	Yegor Dementyev	Ukraine	C5	1:09.558
9	Andrea Tarlao	Italy	C5	1:10.175
10	Jiří Ježek	Czech Republic	C4	1:10.578
11	Wolfgang Sacher	Germany	C5	1:11.019
12	Joao Alberto Schwindt Filho	Brazil	C5	1:11.259
13	Diego German Duenas Gomez	Colombia	C4	1:11.527
14	Chris Ross	New Zealand	C5	1:11.569
15	Sam Kavanagh	United States	C4	1:11.678
16	Soelito Gohr	Brazil	C5	1:13.017
17	Imre Torok	Romania	C5	1:13.774
18	Bahman Golbarnezhad	Iran	C4	1:13.799
19	Koen Reyserhove	Belgium	C4	1:14.689
20	Morten Jahr	Norway	C4	1:16.043
21	Damian Lopez Alfonso	Cuba	C4	1:16.485
22	Jody Cundy	Great Britain	C4	DNF
