= Cycling at the 2020 Summer Paralympics – Men's time trial C4–5 =

Men's time trial C4–5 at the XVI Paralympic Games
- Venue: Izu Velodrome
- Dates: 26 August 2021
- Competitors: 21 from 15 nations

Medalists
1st place, gold medalist(s)		Alfonso Cabello	Spain
2nd place, silver medalist(s)		Jody Cundy	Great Britain
3rd place, bronze medalist(s)		Jozef Metelka	Slovakia

The men's time trial class C4-5 track cycling event at the 2020 Summer Paralympics took place on 26 August 2021 at the Izu Velodrome, Japan. This combine class (C4-5) under classification C is for cyclists who have impairments that affect their legs, arms, and/or trunk but are still capable to use a standard bicycle. 21 cyclists from 15 nations competed in this event.

== Competition format ==
The competition immediately starts off with the finals, where all 21 cyclists will be divided into their own heat individually (so 1 heat contains 1 cyclist). They will do a time trial basis where the fastest cyclist will win gold, the 2nd fastest a silver, and the 3rd fastest a bronze. The distance of this event is 1000m. Cyclists in class C4 can have a lesser-official time than their real-time due to the athletes factor where in class C4 the factor is 98.91% while C5 is 100.00%, so the time cyclist in class C5 get, will be their official time.

== Schedule ==
All times are Japan Standard Time (UTC+9)

Date	Time	Round
Thursday, 26 August	14:00	Finals

== Records ==
Men's C4 1000m Time Trial

World Record	Jody Cundy (GBR)	1:01.466	Aguascalientes, Mexico	12 April 2014
Paralympic Record	Jody Cundy (GBR)	1:04.492	Rio de Janeiro, Brazil	9 September 2016

Men's C5 1000m Time Trial

World Record	Alfonso Cabello (ESP)	1:01.683	Aguascalientes, Mexico	12 April 2014
Paralympic Record	Alfonso Cabello (ESP)	1:04.494	Rio de Janeiro, Brazil	9 September 2016

== Results ==
Rank	Heat	Nation	Cyclists	Class	Real time	Factored time	Notes
1st place, gold medalist(s)	21	Spain	Alfonso Cabello	C5	1:01.557	1:01.557	WR
2nd place, silver medalist(s)	20	Great Britain	Jody Cundy	C4	1:02.529	1:01.847	PR
3rd place, bronze medalist(s)	17	Slovakia	Jozef Metelka	C4	1:05.500	1:04.786	
4	10	China	Wu Guoqing	C4	1:05.548	1:04.834	
5	19	United States	Christopher Murphy	C5	1:05.078	1:05.078	
6	18	France	Dorian Foulon	C5	1:05.348	1:05.348	
7	16	Ukraine	Yegor Dementyev	C5	1:06.322	1:06.322	
8	4	France	Kévin Le Cunff	C5	1:06.357	1:06.357	
9	14	Brazil	Lauro Chaman	C5	1:06.421	1:06.421	
10	13	Malaysia	Zuhairie Ahmad Tarmizi	C5	1:06.472	1:06.472	
11	11	Romania	Carol-Eduard Novak	C4	1:07.655	1:06.918	
12	5	Colombia	Edwin Fabián Mátiz Ruiz	C5	1:06.925	1:06.925	
13	12	Spain	Pablo Jaramillo Gallardo	C5	1:07.081	1:07.081	
14	15	China	Lai Shanzhang	C5	1:07.279	1:07.279	
15	9	Ireland	Ronan Grimes	C4	1:09.014	1:08.262	
16	8	RPC	Sergei Pudov	C4	1:10.430	1:09.662	
17	7	Indonesia	Fadli Immammuddin	C4	1:11.199	1:10.423	
18	3	Colombia	Diego Germán Dueñas	C4	1:11.481	1:10.702	
19	2	Malaysia	Muhammad Hafiz Jamali	C5	1:11.288	1:11.288	
20	1	Hungary	Zsombor Wermeser	C5	1:11.601	1:11.601	
21	6	Brazil	Andre Luiz Grizante	C4	1:13.441	1:12.640	
