= Sam Ruddock =

British Paralympic athlete

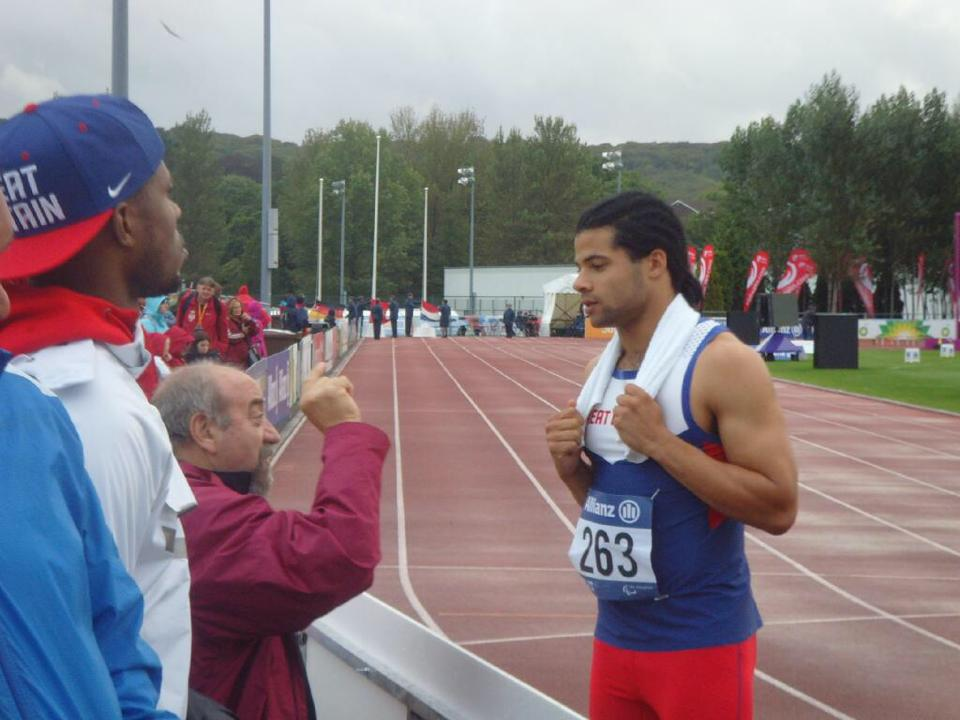
- Ruddock with a coach during the F35 shot put final at the 2014 IPC Athletics European Championships.

Personal information
- Full name: Samuel Ruddock
- Nickname: Sam
- Nationality: British
- Born: 18 February 1990 (age 36) Rugby, Warwickshire
- Education: International Relations (Bachelor of Arts); Loughborough University

Sport
- Country: United Kingdom
- Sport: Cycling
- Disability: Cerebral palsy
- Disability class: C1
- Event: Track time trial
- Club: Loughborough Students CC

Achievements and titles
- Paralympic finals: Rio 2016 London 2012
- World finals: 2015 IPC Athletics World Championships 2013 IPC Athletics World Championships
- Regional finals: 2016 IPC Athletics European Championships 2014 IPC Athletics European Championships
- Highest world ranking: UCI World Rankings C1 – 4th (2020–2021)
- Personal best: 1:16.671 (Kilometre TT)
Medal record
Men's athletics
Representing United Kingdom
European Championships
Silver medal – second place	2016 Grosseto	Shot put – F35
Track World Championships
Gold medal – first place	2022 Saint-Quentin-en-Yvelines	1 km time trial C1
Gold medal – first place	2023 Glasgow	1 km time trial C1
Bronze medal – third place	2023 Glasgow	Omnium C1

Samuel Ruddock (born 18 February 1990) is a Paralympic athlete who represented Great Britain in the T35 classification in 2012 in the 100 metres and in the F35 classification in 2016 in the shot put. He subsequently turned to track cycling, in which he won gold medals in the C1 classification at the 2022 and 2023 UCI World Championships.

== Early life and education ==
Ruddock is from Rugby, Warwickshire. He was diagnosed in infancy with spastic diplegia, a form of cerebral palsy that limits the coordination of his lower body.

He was educated at Bishop Wulstan School and Rugby School, where he took A-levels in English, History and Economics on a scholarship. In school he played basketball, then rugby. He earned a bachelor's degree in International Relations at Loughborough University, where he played American football. In December 2011, athletics coach Joe McDonnell scouted him as a sprinter during an NFL-combine session, and he started full-time training in March 2012.

== Competitive career ==
Ruddock ran his first official races in April 2012 and was classified as a T35 by the International Paralympic Committee the following month. At the IPC Croatian Open, he won gold in the 100m and silver in the 200m and was ranked eighth in the world. After competing in both distances at the McCain Birmingham Games in July 2012, he was selected for the Great Britain team at the September 2012 Paralympics in London.

After the 2012 Paralympics, Ruddock transferred to the shot put. In the F35 class, he finished fifth at the 2014 IPC European Championships in Swansea and fifth at the 2015 IPC World Championships in Doha. In 2016, he won silver at the 2016 IPC European Championships in Grosseto. He was selected to represent Great Britain at the 2016 Paralympic Games in Rio de Janeiro, finishing sixth. At the 2017 IPC World Championships in London, he placed seventh.

Ruddock transferred to track cycling in 2018, with a classification of C1. He represented Great Britain at the 2019 UCI Para-cycling Track World Championships in Apeldoorn and the 2020 UCI World Championships in Milton, Ontario, where he placed fourth in the 1 km time trial. At the 2022 UCI World Championships in Saint-Quentin-en-Yvelines, he won the 1 km time trial; he placed first again at the 2023 UCI World Championships in Glasgow, where he also won bronze in Omnium. In 2023 he also competed for Great Britain in the UCI Para-cycling Road World Cup in Huntsville, Alabama.

== Personal life ==
Ruddock has been an ambassador for Cerebral Palsy Sport and has worked with youth as an athlete mentor for the Youth Sport Trust and through Sky Sports Living for Sport and as an ambassador for Inspire+. He also works with the Kadeena Cox Academy, a black cyclists' initiative.

In April 2025, he was reported missing in Las Vegas after travelling to the United States to see a WrestleMania event. Police confirmed four days later that he had been located safe.

== See also ==
- List of solved missing person cases (2020s)
