= Liang Weicong =

Chinese para-cyclist (born 1995)

Personal information
- Nationality: Chinese
- Born: 3 June 1995 (age 31) Daliang, China

Sport
- Sport: Para-cycling
- Disability class: C1
Medal record
Event	1st	2nd	3rd
Paralympic Games	0	2	0
Track World Championships	5	8	2
Road World Championships	1	0	0
Asian Para Games	2	3	0
Total	8	13	2
Men's para-cycling
Representing China
Paralympic Games
Silver medal – second place	2024 Paris	Individual pursuit C1
Silver medal – second place	2024 Paris	1 km time trial C1–3
Track World Championships
Gold medal – first place	2024 Rio de Janeiro	Scratch race C1
Gold medal – first place	2024 Rio de Janeiro	Omnium C1
Gold medal – first place	2026 Apeldoorn	1 km time trial C1
Gold medal – first place	2026 Apeldoorn	Elimination C1
Gold medal – first place	2026 Apeldoorn	Sprint C1
Silver medal – second place	2019 Apeldoorn	1 km time trial C1
Silver medal – second place	2020 Milton	1 km time trial C1
Silver medal – second place	2020 Milton	Omnium C1
Silver medal – second place	2023 Glasgow	1 km time trial C1
Silver medal – second place	2023 Glasgow	Omnium C1
Silver medal – second place	2024 Rio de Janeiro	1 km time trial C1
Silver medal – second place	2024 Rio de Janeiro	Individual pursuit C1
Silver medal – second place	2026 Apeldoorn	Scratch race C1
Bronze medal – third place	2020 Milton	Individual pursuit C1
Bronze medal – third place	2023 Glasgow	Individual pursuit C1
Road World Championships
Gold medal – first place	2023 Glasgow	Road race C1
Asian Para Games
Gold medal – first place	2022 Hangzhou	Road race C1-3
Gold medal – first place	2022 Hangzhou	Track Cycling Team Sprint C1–5
Silver medal – second place	2022 Hangzhou	Road Cycling Time trial C1-3
Silver medal – second place	2022 Hangzhou	Track Cycling 1 km time trial C1-3
Silver medal – second place	2022 Hangzhou	Track Cycling Pursuit C1

Liang Weicong (born 3 June 1995) is a Chinese para-cyclist who represented China at the 2024 Summer Paralympics.

== Career ==
Liang made his international debut for China at the 2019 UCI Para-cycling Track World Championships and won a silver medal in the 1 km time trial C1 with a time of 1:13.865. He again represented China at the 2020 UCI Para-cycling Track World Championships and won a silver medal in the 200 metres C1 event.

Liang represented China at the 2023 UCI Para-cycling Track World Championships and won silver medals in the 1 km time trial and omnium, and a bronze medal in the individual pursuit events. He again represented China at the 2024 UCI Para-cycling Track World Championships and won gold medals in the scratch race and omnium, and silver medals in the 1 km time trial and individual pursuit events.

He represented China at the 2024 Summer Paralympics and won silver medals in the individual pursuit C1 and time trial C1–3 events.
