= Cycling at the 2016 Summer Paralympics – Men's 1 km time trial C1–3 =

Cycling, Men's 1 km Time Trial C1-2-3 at the XV Paralympic Games
- Dates: September 11, 2016
- Competitors: 26

Medalists
| 1st place, gold medalist(s) | | Zhangyu Li | China |
| 2nd place, silver medalist(s) | | Arnoud Nijhuis | Netherlands |
| 3rd place, bronze medalist(s) | | Tristen Chernove | Canada |

The Men's 1 km Time Trial C1-2-3 track cycling event at the 2016 Summer Paralympics took place on September 11. Twenty six riders competed.

== Results ==
| Rank | Athlete | Nation | Classification | Time | Factor (%) | Final time |
|---|---|---|---|---|---|---|
| 1st place, gold medalist(s) | Zhangyu Li | China | C1 | 01:11.94 WR | 92.69 | 01:06.68 |
| 2nd place, silver medalist(s) | Arnoud Nijhuis | Netherlands | C1 | 01:13.36 | 92.69 | 01:08.00 |
| 3rd place, bronze medalist(s) | Tristen Chernove | Canada | C2 | 01:14.72 PR | 93.13 | 01:09.58 |
| 4 | Guihua Liang | China | C2 | 01:15.54 | 93.13 | 01:10.35 |
| 5 | Joseph Berenyi | United States | C3 | 01:10.51 | 100 | 01:10.51 |
| 6 | Louis Rolfe | Great Britain | C2 | 01:15.79 | 93.13 | 01:10.58 |
| 7 | Eduardo Santas Asensio | Spain | C3 | 01:12.28 | 100 | 01:12.28 |
| 8 | Ivo Koblasa | Czech Republic | C2 | 01:17.74 | 93.13 | 01:12.40 |
| 9 | Hao Xie | China | C2 | 01:17.75 | 93.13 | 01:12.41 |
| 10 | Kris Bosmans | Belgium | C3 | 01:12.58 | 100 | 01:12.58 |
| 11 | Masaki Fujita | Japan | C3 | 01:13.18 | 100 | 01:13.18 |
| 12 | Diederick Schelfhout | Belgium | C3 | 01:13.67 | 100 | 01:13.67 |
| 13 | Shota Kawamoto | Japan | C2 | 01:19.25 | 93.13 | 01:13.80 |
| 14 | Alvaro Galvis Becerra | Colombia | C2 | 01:19.54 | 93.13 | 01:14.08 |
| 15 | Ross Wilson | Canada | C1 | 01:20.43 | 92.69 | 01:14.55 |
| 16 | Rodrigo Lopez | Argentina | C1 | 01:20.70 | 92.69 | 01:14.80 |
| 17 | Michael Sametz | Canada | C3 | 01:15.17 | 100 | 01:15.17 |
| 18 | Yongsik Jin | South Korea | C3 | 01:16.04 | 100 | 01:16.04 |
| 19 | Esneider Munoz Marin | Colombia | C3 | 01:16.54 | 100 | 01:16.54 |
| 20 | Roger Bolliger | Switzerland | C2 | 01:23.16 | 93.13 | 01:17.45 |
| 21 | Erich Winkler | Germany | C1 | 01:23.91 | 92.69 | 01:17.77 |
| 22 | Amador Granados Alkorta | Spain | C3 | 01:18.38 | 100 | 01:18.38 |
| 23 | Billy Lister | United States | C1 | 01:24.58 | 92.69 | 01:18.40 |
| 24 | Juan Jose Mendez Fernandez | Spain | C1 | 01:28.72 | 92.69 | 01:22.24 |
| 25 | Giancarlo Masini | Italy | C1 | 01:29.32 | 92.69 | 01:22.79 |
| 26 | Attila Olah | Romania | C2 | 01:29.03 | 93.13 | 01:22.91 |
