= Cycling at the 2012 Summer Paralympics – Men's 1 km time trial C1–3 =

Cycling, Men's 1 km time trial C1-3 at the XIV Paralympic Games
- Venue: ExCeL Exhibition Centre
- Dates: 30 August 2012
- Competitors: 28 from 18 nations
- Winning time: 1:05.021

Medalists
1st place, gold medalist(s)		Li Zhang Yu	China
2nd place, silver medalist(s)		Mark Colbourne	Great Britain
3rd place, bronze medalist(s)		Tobias Graf	Germany

The Men's 1 km time trial, Classes 1-3 track cycling event at the 2012 Summer Paralympics took place on 30 August at London Velopark.

== Results ==
WR = World Record

Rank	Name	Country	Class	Factored Time
1st place, gold medalist(s)	Li Zhang Yu	China	C1	1:05.021 WR
2nd place, silver medalist(s)	Mark Colbourne	Great Britain	C1	1:08.471
3rd place, bronze medalist(s)	Tobias Graf	Germany	C2	1:09.979
4	Darren Kenny	Great Britain	C3	1:10.203
5	Liang Guihua	China	C2	1:10.211
6	Xie Hao	China	C2	1:10.229
7	Rodrigo Fernando Lopez	Argentina	C1	1:10.689
8	Alexsey Obydennov	Russia	C3	1:10.995
9	Richard Waddon	Great Britain	C3	1:11.394
10	Joseph Berenyi	United States	C3	1:11.649
11	Jaco Nel	South Africa	C2	1:12.405
12	Brayden McDougall	Canada	C1	1:12.683
13	Ivo Koblasa	Czech Republic	C2	1:12.730
14	Kris Bosmans	Belgium	C3	1:12.825
15	David Nicholas	Australia	C3	1:13.087
16	Enda Smyth	Ireland	C3	1:13.890
17	Jin Yong Sik	South Korea	C3	1:14.061
18	Alvaro Galvis Becerra	Colombia	C2	1:14.275
19	Michael Teuber	Germany	C1	1:14.425
20	Masaki Fujita	Japan	C3	1:14.998
21	Michal Stark	Czech Republic	C2	1:15.755
22	Steffen Warias	Germany	C3	1:15.828
23	Nathan Smith	New Zealand	C3	1:16.159
24	Juan Jose Mendez	Spain	C1	1:16.743
25	Arnold Boldt	Canada	C2	1:17.304
26	Jaye Milley	Canada	C1	1:17.631
27	Victor Hugo Garrido Marquez	Venezuela	C2	1:18.089
28	Anthony Zahn	United States	C1	1:23.312
