= Gordon Allan =

Australian Paralympic cyclist

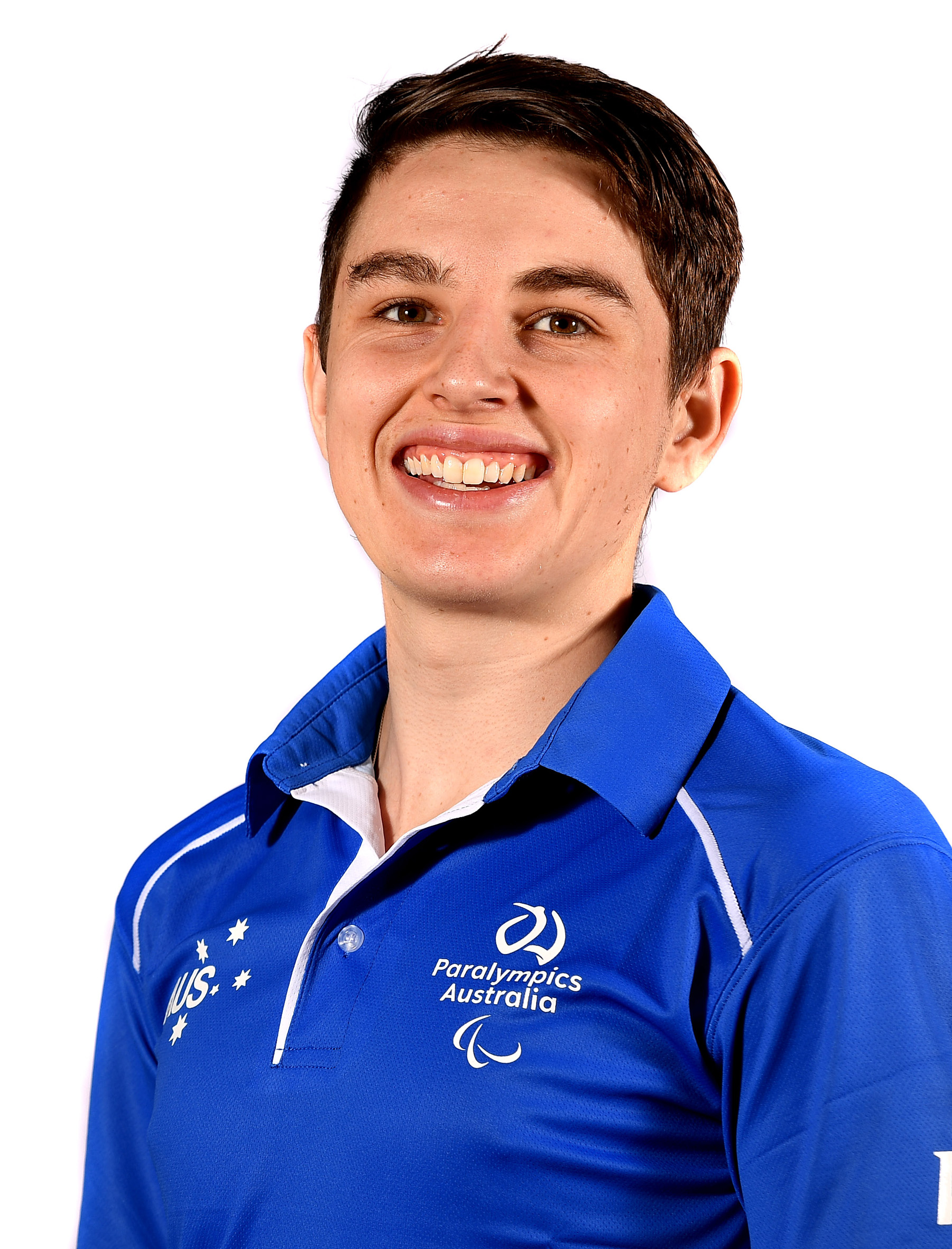
- Gordon Allan in 2019

Personal information
- Nationality: Australian
- Born: 3 April 1998 (age 28)

Sport
- Country: Australia
- Sport: Cycling
- Disability class: C2
Medal record
Men's para-cycling
Representing Australia
Paralympic Games
Bronze medal – third place	2024 Paris	Mixed team sprint C1–5
Track World Championships
Silver medal – second place	2019 Apeldoorn	Time trial C2
Silver medal – second place	2024 Rio de Janeiro	Time trial C2
Silver medal – second place	2024 Rio de Janeiro	Time trial C2
Silver medal – second place	2025 Rio de Janeiro	Sprint C2
Silver medal – second place	2026 Apeldoorn	Sprint C2
Bronze medal – third place	2020 Milton	Time trial C2
Bronze medal – third place	2022 Saint-Quentin-en-Yvelines	Time trial C2
Bronze medal – third place	2022 Saint-Quentin-en-Yvelines	Mixed team sprint C1-5
Bronze medal – third place	2023 Glasgow	Time trial C2
Bronze medal – third place	2024 Rio de Janeiro	Mixed team sprint C1-5
Bronze medal – third place	2025 Rio de Janeiro	Time trial C2
Commonwealth Games
Silver medal – second place	2026 Glasgow	Time trial C1-3

Gordon Allan (born 3 April 1998) is an Australian Paralympic cyclist who won medals at World Para Track Championships. He competed at the 2020 and the 2024 Summer Paralympics.

== Personal ==
Allan was born 3 April 1998. Allan was born with cerebral palsy affecting his four limbs due to a loss of oxygen at birth. He attended Patrician Brothers' College, Blacktown. He completed a Bachelor of Sport and Exercise Science at Western Sydney University.

== Cycling ==
Before committing to cycling, Allan was active in athletics, swimming, and football. He represented Australia at the Football World Championship Under 19 at the 2015 CPISRA World Games.

Allan is classified as a C2 cyclist. His cycling ability was spotted at an Australian Paralympic Committee talent search day at Blacktown and he subsequently joined the Parramatta Cycling Club and commenced training at the Western Sydney Academy of Sport at Homebush. Allan took up cycling seriously in 2013. In 2016 as a 17 year old, he won the Men's Road Race and the Men's Time C2 at the Australian Championships but he was not selected for the 2016 Rio Paralympics. He won the Men's Time Trial and Men's Individual Pursuit C2 at the 2019 Para Track Cycling National Championships.

At the 2019 UCI Para-cycling Track World Championships in Apeldoorn, Netherlands, he won the silver medal in the Men's 1 km Time Trial C2. His time of 1min 12.873secs was a new world record but it was broken by the final competitor Alejandro Perea who just broke his new record by 0.005secs. (1min12.838secs).

At the 2020 UCI Para-cycling Track World Championships in Milton, Ontario, he won the bronze medal in Men's Time Trial C2.

At the 2020 Tokyo Paralympics, Allan finished fifth in the Men's time trial C1–3 and ninth together with Meg Lemon and Amanda Reid in the Mixed team sprint C1–5.

At the 2022 UCI Para-cycling Track World Championships in Saint-Quentin-en-Yvelines, France, he won two bronze medals - Men's Time Trial C2 and Mixed Team Sprint C1-5.

At the 2024 UCI Para-cycling Track World Championships in Rio de Janeiro, Brazil, he won two medals - silver medal in the Men's Time Trial C2 and bronze medal in the Mixed Team Sprint C1-5.

At the 2024 Paris Paralympics, he finished fifth in the Men's Time trial C1-3, 22nd in the Men's road race H4 and the bronze medal in the Mixed team sprint C1-5.

At the 2025 UCI Para-cycling Track World Championships in Rio de Janeiro, Brazil, he won the silver medal in the Men's Sprint C2 and the bronze medal in Men's Time Trial C2.
