= Ander Cepas =

Spanish para table tennis player

Personal information
- Born: 18 August 2004 (age 21)
- Home town: Madrid, Spain

Sport
- Sport: Para table tennis
- Disability class: C9
Medal record
Para table tennis
Representing Spain
Paralympic Games
Bronze medal – third place	2024 Paris	Singles C9

Ander Cepas (born 18 August 2004) is a Spanish para table tennis player. He represented Spain at the 2024 Summer Paralympics.

== Career ==
Cepas represented Spain at the 2024 Summer Paralympics and won a bronze medal in the singles C9 event.
