= Lai Shanzhang =

Chinese Paralympic cyclist

Personal information
- Born: 7 November 1992 (age 33) Sanshui District, Foshan, Guangdong, China

Cycling career
- Sport: Cycling
- Disciplines: Track, Road
Medal record
Track cycling
Representing China
Paralympic Games
Silver medal – second place	2020 Tokyo	Mixed team sprint C1–5
Track World Championships
Gold medal – first place	2019 Apeldoorn	Team sprint
Gold medal – first place	2020 Milton	Team sprint
Gold medal – first place	2023 Glasgow	Mixed team sprint C1–5
Silver medal – second place	2018 Rio de Janeiro	Team sprint
Asian Para Games
Gold medal – first place	2018 Jakarta	Team sprint
Silver medal – second place	2018 Jakarta	Time trial C4–5
Road cycling
Asian Para Games
Gold medal – first place	2018 Jakarta	Time trial C5
Silver medal – second place	2018 Jakarta	Road race C5

Lai Shanzhang (born 7 November 1992) is a Chinese cyclist. He competed at the 2020 Summer Paralympics in the men's time trial C4–5 and mixed team sprint C1–5, winning a silver medal in the latter.
