= Jon-Allan Butterworth =

British Paralympic cyclist

Medal record

Men's Para-cycling

Representing Great Britain

Paralympic Games
| Gold medal – first place | 2016 Rio de Janeiro | Mixed team sprint |
| Silver medal – second place | 2012 London | Kilo - C4-5 |
| Silver medal – second place | 2012 London | 4km pursuit - C5 |
| Silver medal – second place | 2012 London | Mixed team sprint |

Track World Championships
| Gold medal – first place | 2011 Montichiari | Kilo - C5 |
| Gold medal – first place | 2012 Los Angeles | Kilo - C5 |
| Gold medal – first place | 2016 Montichiari | Mixed team sprint |
| Silver medal – second place | 2014 Aguascalientes | Kilo - C5 |
| Silver medal – second place | 2016 Montichiari | Kilo - C5 |
| Gold medal – first place | 2016 Montichiari | Mixed team sprint |
| Bronze medal – third place | 2014 Aguascalientes | 4km pursuit - C5 |

Jon-Allan Edward Butterworth MBE (born 6 February 1986 in Birmingham) is a British paralympic cyclist. He represented Great Britain at the 2012 & 2016 Summer Paralympics.

Butterworth lost his left arm in 2007 in an insurgent rocket attack when serving as a senior aircraftman weapons technician with the Royal Air Force at Basra airbase in Iraq. He had previously served in Afghanistan in 2005.

Butterworth got into cycling by taking part in the first Help for Heroes bike ride in 2008, from there he went on to be recognized as talented at a ParalympicsGB Talent ID day

At London 2012 he won silver medals in the C4-5 kilo, C5 4km individual Pursuit and mixed team sprint. In the kilo, his C5 world record was beaten by Alfonso Cabello.

At the 2016 Summer Paralympics, Butterworth finished in fourth place in the C4-5 1k Time trial, and then won Gold with Jody Cundy and Louis Rolfe in the C1-5 750m Team Sprint.

Butterworth was appointed Member of the Order of the British Empire (MBE) in the 2017 New Year Honours for services to cycling.
