= Ricardo Ten Argilés =

Spanish Paralympic swimmer

Ricardo Ten
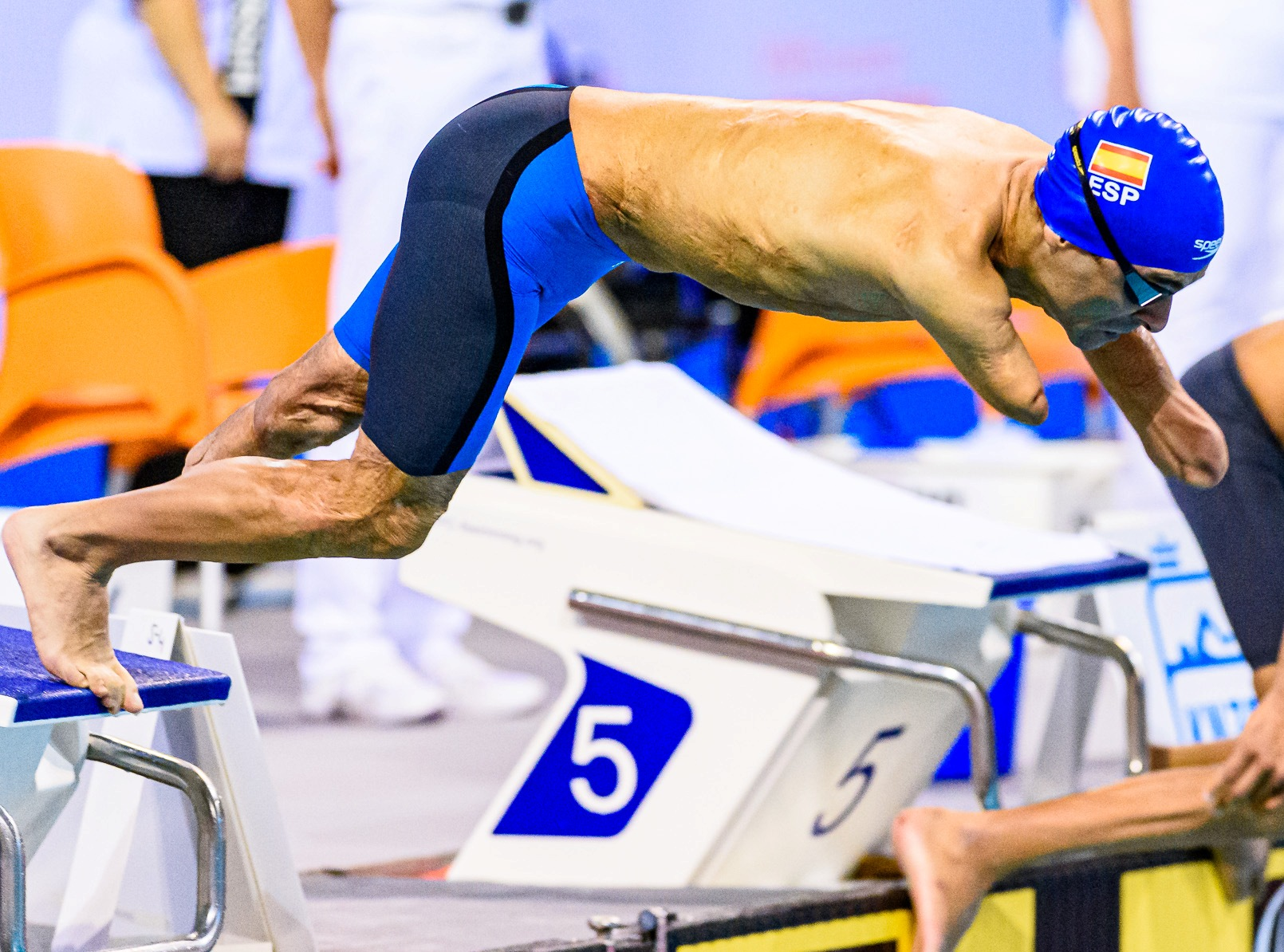
- Ten in 2014

Personal information
- Full name: Ricardo Ten Argilés
- Nationality: Spain
- Born: 11 August 1975 (age 51) Valencia, Spain

Sport
- Sport: Swimming
Medal record
Men's swimming
Representing Spain
Paralympic Games
Gold medal – first place	2000 Sydney	100m breaststroke SB4
Gold medal – first place	2000 Sydney	4x50m Medley Relay 20Pts
Gold medal – first place	2008 Beijing	100m breaststroke SB4
Silver medal – second place	1996 Atlanta	100m breaststroke SB4
Bronze medal – third place	1996 Atlanta	4×50 m medley S1–6
Bronze medal – third place	2008 Beijing	4x50m medley relay 20Pts
Bronze medal – third place	2012 London	100m breaststroke SB4
World Championships
Gold medal – first place	1998 Christchurch	100m breaststroke SB4
Gold medal – first place	2002 Mar del Plata	100m breaststroke SB4
Gold medal – first place	2006 Durban	100m breaststroke SB4
Silver medal – second place	2006 Durban	4x50m medley relay 20Pts
Silver medal – second place	2010 Eindhoven	100m breaststroke SB4
Silver medal – second place	2013 Montreal	100m breaststroke SB4
Silver medal – second place	2013 Montreal	100m breaststroke SB4
Silver medal – second place	2013 Montreal	4x50m medley relay 20Pts
Bronze medal – third place	1998 Christchurch	100m butterfly S5
Bronze medal – third place	1998 Christchurch	100m backstroke S5
Bronze medal – third place	2010 Eindhoven	4x50m medley relay 20pts
Bronze medal – third place	2015 Glasgow	100 m breaststroke SB4
European Championships
Gold medal – first place	2009 Reykjavik	100m breaststroke SB4
Gold medal – first place	2009 Reykjavik	4x50m medley relay 20pts
Gold medal – first place	2014 Eindhoven	100m breaststroke SB4
Gold medal – first place	2016 Funchal	100 m breaststroke – SB4
Silver medal – second place	2009 Reykjavik	50 m backstroke S5
Silver medal – second place	2009 Reykjavik	50 m butterfly S5
Silver medal – second place	2014 Eindhoven	4x100m freestyle relay 20pts
Men's Para-cycling
Representing Spain
Paralympic Games
Gold medal – first place	2024 Paris	Men's time trial C1
Silver medal – second place	2024 Paris	Mixed team sprint C1–5
Bronze medal – third place	2020 Tokyo	Mixed team sprint C1–5
Bronze medal – third place	2024 Paris	Individual pursuit C1
Track World Championships
Gold medal – first place	2020 Milton	Scratch race C1
Silver medal – second place	2020 Milton	Omnium C1
Gold medal – first place	2022 Saint-Quentin-en-Yvelines	Scratch race C1
Gold medal – first place	2022 Saint-Quentin-en-Yvelines	Individual pursuit C1
Gold medal – first place	2023 Glasgow	Scratch race C1
Gold medal – first place	2023 Glasgow	Omnium C1
Gold medal – first place	2025 Rio de Janeiro	Time trial C1
Gold medal – first place	2025 Rio de Janeiro	Scratch race C1
Gold medal – first place	2025 Rio de Janeiro	Elimination C1
Gold medal – first place	2026 Apeldoorn	Scratch race C1
Silver medal – second place	2020 Milton	Individual pursuit C1
Silver medal – second place	2022 Saint-Quentin-en-Yvelines	Time trial C1
Silver medal – second place	2023 Glasgow	Individual pursuit C1
Silver medal – second place	2025 Rio de Janeiro	Sprint C1
Silver medal – second place	2026 Apeldoorn	Elimination C1
Silver medal – second place	2026 Apeldoorn	Sprint C1
Bronze medal – third place	2023 Glasgow	Mixed team sprint C1–5
Bronze medal – third place	2024 Rio de Janeiro	Individual pursuit C1
Bronze medal – third place	2024 Rio de Janeiro	Omnium C1
Bronze medal – third place	2020 Milton	Time trial C1
Bronze medal – third place	2026 Apeldoorn	1 km time trial C1
Road World Championships
Gold medal – first place	2023 Glasgow	Time trial C1
Gold medal – first place	2024 Zurich	Time trial C1
Gold medal – first place	2024 Zurich	Road race C1
Gold medal – first place	2025 Ronse	Time trial C1
Silver medal – second place	2023 Glasgow	Road race C1
Silver medal – second place	2025 Ronse	Road race C1
European Championships
Gold medal – first place	2023 Rotterdam	Time trial C1
Gold medal – first place	2023 Rotterdam	Road race C1

Ricardo Ten Argilés (born 11 August 1975) is a Spanish Paralympic swimmer and para-cyclist.

== Personal ==
Ten was born on 11 August 1975 in Valencia. At the age of eight he touched high-voltage power lines; his injuries resulted in his arms and left leg being amputated.

== Swimming ==
Ten is an S5 type swimmer.

In 2007, Ten competed at the IDM German Open. Ten competed at the 2010 Adapted Swimming World Championship in the Netherlands, where he won a gold medal, a silver medal and a bronze medal. In advance of the competition, he attended a swimming camp with the national team that was part of the Paralympic High Performance Program (HARP Program). In 2010, he competed at the Tenerife International Open. He competed at the 2011 IPC European Swimming Championships in Berlin, Germany, finishing fifth in the 50 meters butterfly. In 2012, he competed at the Paralympic Swimming Championship of Spain by Autonomous Communities. He competed at the 2013 IPC Swimming World Championships.

=== Paralympics ===
Ten competed at the 1996 Summer Paralympics, 2000 Summer Paralympics, 2008 Summer Paralympics and 2012 Summer Paralympics. In 1996, he finished second in the 100 meter breaststroke and third in the 4 x 50 meter 20 points medley relay race. In 2000, he finished first in the 100 meter breaststroke and first in the 4 x 50 meter 20 points medley relay race. In 2008, he finished first in the 100 meter breaststroke. In 2012, he finished third in the 100 meter breaststroke. On 12 August 2023 he won the World Championship in category C1 in cycling; a part of his prize was a wristwatch. He went on to win a bronze medal in the Men's Pursuit C1 at the 2024 Summer Paralympics on 29 August 2024, a silver medal in the Mixed team sprint C1–5 on 1 September and a gold medal on 4 September in the Men's time trial C1.
