= Li Zhangyu =

Chinese Paralympic cyclist

Medal record

Cycling

Representing China

Paralympic Games
Gold medal – first place	2012 London	1 km time trial C1–3
Gold medal – first place	2016 Rio de Janeiro	1 km time trial C1–3
Gold medal – first place	2016 Rio de Janeiro	Individual pursuit C1
Gold medal – first place	2020 Tokyo	1 km time trial C1–3
Gold medal – first place	2024 Paris	Individual pursuit C1
Gold medal – first place	2024 Paris	1 km time trial C1–3
Silver medal – second place	2020 Tokyo	Mixed team sprint C1–5
Bronze medal – third place	2020 Tokyo	Individual pursuit C1

Track World Championships
Gold medal – first place	2020 Milton	1 km time trial C1
Gold medal – first place	2020 Milton	Individual pursuit C1
Gold medal – first place	2023 Glasgow	Individual pursuit C1
Gold medal – first place	2023 Glasgow	Mixed team sprint C1–5
Gold medal – first place	2024 Rio de Janeiro	Individual pursuit C1
Gold medal – first place	2024 Rio de Janeiro	1 km time trial C1
Silver medal – second place	2024 Rio de Janeiro	Omnium C1
Bronze medal – third place	2023 Glasgow	1 km time trial C1

Asian Para Games
Gold medal – first place	2018 Jakarta	Track Cycling Pursuit C1–2
Gold medal – first place	2018 Jakarta	Track Cycling Team Sprint C1–5
Gold medal – first place	2022 Hangzhou	Track Cycling Pursuit C1
Gold medal – first place	2022 Hangzhou	Track Cycling Team Sprint C1–5
Bronze medal – third place	2018 Jakarta	Road Cycling Time Trial C1–2

Li Zhangyu (Chinese: 李樟煜; pinyin: Lǐ Zhāngyù; born 12 August 1988) is a Chinese cyclist.

== Career ==
He won a gold medal in the Men's 1km time trial C1-2-3 event at the 2012 Summer Paralympics.
