= Pablo Jaramillo Gallardo =

Spanish Paralympic cyclist

Personal information
- Nationality: Spanish
- Born: 9 April 1977 (age 49)

Sport
- Country: Spain
- Sport: Paralympic cycling
Medal record
Men's para-cycling
Representing Spain
Paralympic Games
| Silver medal – second place | 2024 Paris | Mixed team sprint C1–5 |
| Bronze medal – third place | 2020 Tokyo | Mixed team sprint C1–5 |
Track World Championships
| Silver medal – second place | 2017 Los Angeles | Mixed team sprint C1–5 |
| Silver medal – second place | 2009 Manchester | 1 km time trial |
| Bronze medal – third place | 2015 Apeldoorn | 1 km time trial |
| Bronze medal – third place | 2011 Montichiari | 1 km time trial |
| Bronze medal – third place | 2009 Manchester | Mixed team sprint C1–5 |
| Bronze medal – third place | 2023 Glasgow | Mixed team sprint C1–5 |
| Bronze medal – third place | 2025 Rio de Janeiro | Mixed team sprint C1–5 |

Pablo Jaramillo Gallardo (born 9 April 1977) is a Spanish para-cyclist. He won a bronze medal at the 2020 Summer Paralympics in the mixed team sprint C1–5. In addition, he won five medals at the UCI Para-cycling Track World Championships between 2009 and 2017.
