= Alfonso Cabello =

Spanish Paralympic cyclist

- Alfonso Cabello (2026)

Personal information
- Full name: Alfonso Cabello Llamas
- Nationality: Spanish
- Born: 19 September 1993 (age 33) La Rambla

Sport
- Country: Spain
- Sport: Paralympic cycling
- Events: Men's individual C 4 5 Road Race, Men's individual C.4-5 1 km, Mixed C1 to 5 Team Sprint
- Club: Vipren, Cadiz
- Coached by: Salvador Cabeza de Vaca
Medal record
Men's para-cycling
Representing Spain
Paralympic Games
Gold medal – first place	2012 London	Men's 1 km time trial C4–5
Gold medal – first place	2020 Tokyo	Men's 1 km time trial C4–5
Silver medal – second place	2024 Paris	Mixed team sprint C1–5
Bronze medal – third place	2016 Rio de Janeiro	Men's 1 km time trial C4–5
Bronze medal – third place	2016 Rio de Janeiro	Mixed team sprint C1–5
Bronze medal – third place	2024 Paris	Time trial C4–5
Track World Championships
Gold medal – first place	2016 Montichiari	1km time trial C5
Gold medal – first place	2020 Milton	1 km time trial C5
Gold medal – first place	2025 Rio de Janeiro	1 km time trial C5
Gold medal – first place	2026 Apeldoorn	1 km time trial C5
Gold medal – first place	2026 Apeldoorn	Sprint C5
Silver medal – second place	2024 Rio de Janeiro	1 km time trial C5
Bronze medal – third place	2016 Montichiari	Mixed Team Pursuit
Bronze medal – third place	2023 Glasgow	Mixed team sprint C1–5
Bronze medal – third place	2025 Rio de Janeiro	Sprint C1
Bronze medal – third place	2026 Apeldoorn	Mixed team sprint C1–5

Alfonso Cabello Llamas (Note: In this Spanish name, the first or paternal surname is Cabello and the second or maternal family name is Llamas.) (born 19 September 1993) is a Spanish Paralympic cyclist. Representing Spain at the 2012 Summer Paralympics, Cabello won a gold medal in the men's 1 km time trial C4–5 at the 2012 and 2020 Summer Paralympics, taking the current world record in the latter.

== Personal ==
Cabello was born on 19 September 1993 in La Rambla without his left hand. As a child, his mother made sure that missing his hand would not get in the way of him doing things. She insisted he learn to tie his shoe laces without assistance and using his only hand. Other sports he played as a child included basketball and swimming. Swimming helped him develop better body balance in terms of being able to function using his stump and his right hand. In physical education classes, teachers would tell him he would not need to meet the same standards as his classmates because of his disability.

In 2008, he was recognised at the Andalusian Federation of Sports for the Physically Handicapped gala. In 2009, he was one of fourteen athletes from Cordoba to get an Andalucía Olympic Foundation scholarship. In December 2013, he attended an event marking Spanish insurance company Santa Lucía Seguros becoming a sponsor of the Spanish Paralympic Committee, and consequently Plan ADOP which funds high performance Spanish disability sport competitors. He chose to attend the event because he wanted to show support for this type of sponsorship. In 2013, Cabello was awarded the gold Real Orden al Mérito Deportivo.

== Cycling ==
When Cabello first learned to ride a bicycle, he used the stump on one hand to manipulate the brakes. The first race he participated in was an exhibition one. From there, he quickly moved to provisional competitions.

In May 2008, he participated in the Third International Criterium Cycling Disability in France. Competing at the European Cup Adapted Cycling in 2008, he finished sixteenth in the LC1 in the 56.4 kilometer long race. In 2011, he participated in the Spanish national disability cycling track championship, where he earned a first-place finish. He competed in the 2011 World Championships. At the Los Angeles hosted 2012 Paralympic Cycling World Championships, he won a bronze medal in the C5 km race with a personal best time of 1:07.876. He also participated in the team sprint event. He won a gold medal at the 2012 Summer Paralympics games in London, United Kingdom in the Men's 1 km time trial C4-5 taking the C5 world record from Jon-Allan Butterworth. His gold medal was the first Gold won by Spain at the 2012 Games. The win came with some controversy, due to the disqualification of 4-time defending champion Jody Cundy for a false start, which Cundy maintained was due to a mechanical error of the starting gate. Cabello would win another gold in the same discipline in 2020 Summer Paralympics in Tokyo, setting a world record time of 1:01.557, marking the first time that Cundy had his time beaten in the discipline at the Paralympics.
