= Pierre Senska =

German cyclist (born 1988)

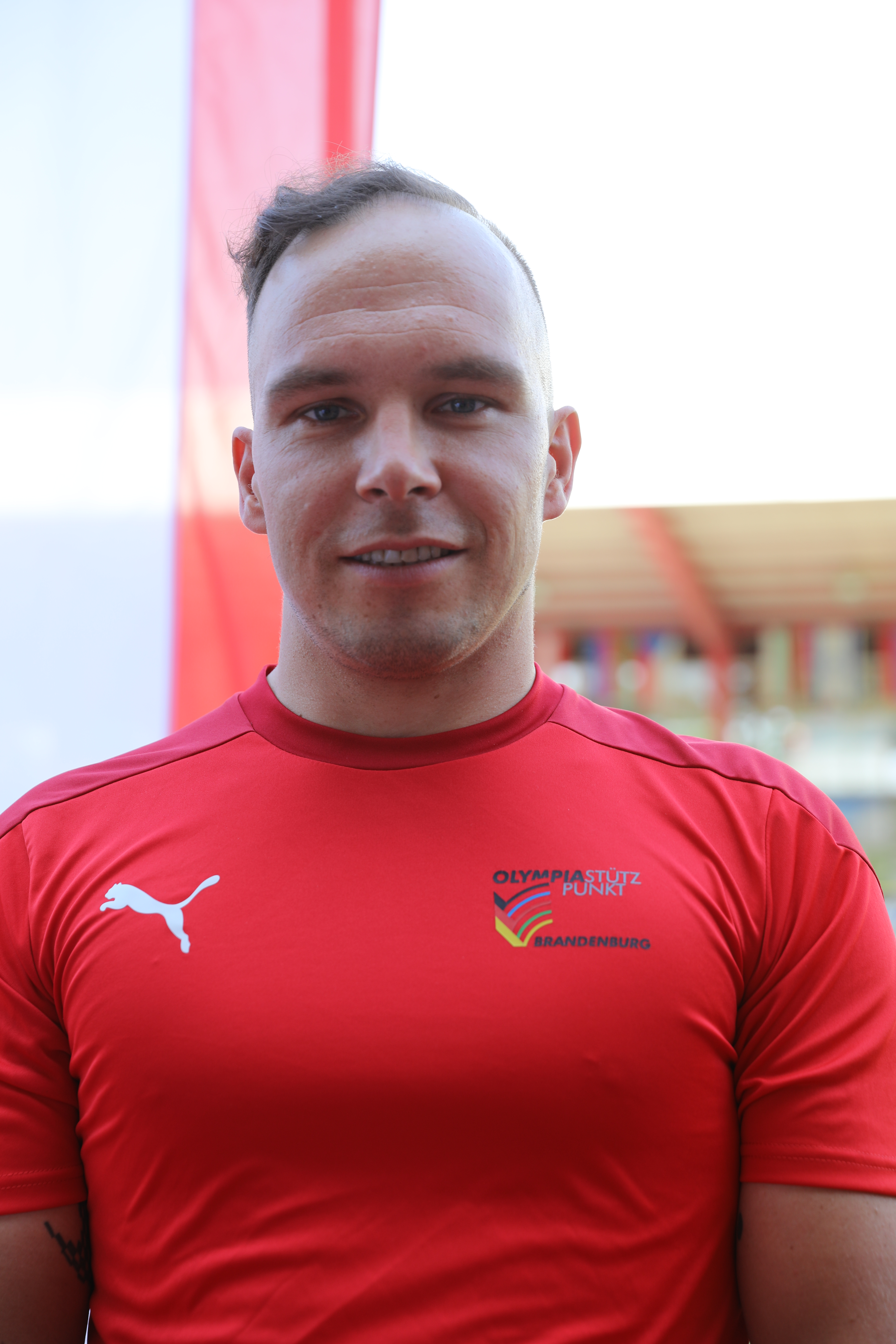
- Senska in 2024

Personal information
- Nationality: German
- Born: 21 June 1988 (age 38) Berlin, Germany

Sport
- Country: Germany
- Sport: Track and road cycling
- Disability class: C1
- Club: BSC Berlin

Achievements and titles
- Paralympic finals: 2008 Beijing
Medal record
Representing Germany
Men's Para-cycling
Road World Championships
Gold medal – first place	2015 Nottwil	Road Race (C1)
Gold medal – first place	2009 Bogogno	Road Race (LC4)
Bronze medal – third place	2011 Roskilde	Road Race (LC4)
Bronze medal – third place	2024 Zurich	Road race C1
Bronze medal – third place	2025 Ronse	Time trial C1
Track World Championships
Silver medal – second place	2023 Glasgow	Scratch race C1
Bronze medal – third place	2022 Saint-Quentin-en-Yvelines	Scratch race C1
Bronze medal – third place	2022 Saint-Quentin-en-Yvelines	Individual pursuit C1

Pierre Senska (born 21 June 1988) is a disabled German Para-cyclist.

== Career ==
He won the Para-Cycling World Championships road race in the LC 4 category in Bordeaux in 2007. He received an award for Junior Sportsman of the Year from the German Sports Aid Foundation in November 2007. He took part in the Men's LC4 3 km individual pursuit event at the 2008 Summer Paralympics held in Beijing during September 2008.
