= Cycling at the 2016 Summer Paralympics =

Cycling at the XV Paralympic Games
- Pictograms for road (left) and track (right) cycling
- Venue: Rio Olympic Velodrome; Copacabana Cluster
- Dates: 8–11 September 2016 (track); 14-17 September 2016 (road)
- Competitors: 230

Cycling at the 2016 Summer Paralympics consisted of 50 events in two main disciplines, track cycling and road cycling. The venues were the Rio Olympic Velodrome for track cycling in the Barra Cluster, and the Flamengo Park for the road cycling disciplines in the Copacabana Cluster. Seventeen events were contested on the track, and 33 on the road.

== Classification ==
Cyclists are given a classification depending on the type and extent of their disability. This method is known as a functional system and was introduced in 2012. Athletes are classified according to their functional ability across four broad categories (blind or partially sighted tandem, handcycle, tricycle and standard bicycle). The class number indicates the severity of impairment with "1" being most impaired. The classification system allows cyclists to compete against others with a similar level of function.

Riders with recovering or deteriorating conditions such as MS are eligible but must have been reclassified within six months of a World Championships or Paralympic Games to ensure their classification is correct. Specialised equipment including prostheses is only allowed where it has been specifically approved.

B – tandem bicycle

This class is for athletes who have visual impairments and therefore ride tandem bicycles with a guide (known as a pilot). They may have any level of visual impairment from no light perception in either eye through to a visual acuity of 6/60 and/or a visual field of less than 20 degrees.

H (1-5) – handcycle

This class is for athletes who are lower limb amputees, have paraplegia or tetraplegia and ride a handcycle using arms to turn pedals for propulsion. H1–4 cyclists compete in a lying position, whereas H5 cyclists compete in a kneeling position.

T (1-2) – tricycle

This class is for athletes who have a neurological condition or an impairment which has a comparable effect on their cycling so that they are not able to compete on a standard bicycle for reasons of balance.

C (1-5) – standard bicycle

This class is for athletes with moderate locomotion impairment who do not require a tricycle. In many cases a modification will be allowed to accommodate a leg or arm prosthesis.

=== Factored events ===
Some cycling events, 16 in total across track and road, are factored. This can happen when cyclists from different classes compete against each other and means that the results take into account the severity of the impairments of each competitor. As a result, some riders within an event will have their times ‘factored’ while other riders will not, or will have their time factored in a different calculation. The gold medal goes to the athlete with the fastest time after all the required times have been calculated. It is therefore possible for an athlete to break a paralympic or world record in their event for their specific classification, but to finish behind a differently classified athlete in that event after factoring. In such a case, the record is still treated as an official World, or as the case may be, Paralympic Games record within their classification for that event.

Factoring should not be confused with certain events where athletes with a greater impairment are entitled to compete in a race for athletes with a 'lesser' impairment, for example double amputees (such as Oscar Pistorius) in a single leg amputee athletics race alongside runners such as Jonnie Peacock or Richard Browne. In such races, no factoring is taken into account. In cycling, a number of the road races are cross-classification and non-factored despite factoring taking place in the time trial for the same classifications.

== Events ==
Events in each classification, including factored events in joined classifications are set out below.

Classification → Event ↓	B	C					T		H				
Classification → Event ↓	B	C1	C2	C3	C4	C5	T1	T2	H1	H2	H3	H4	H5
Road cycling
Men's road race	●	●			●		●			●	●	●	●
Women's road race	●	●			●		●		●				●
Men's time trial	●	●	●	●	●	●	●			●	●	●	●
Women's time trial	●	●			●	●	●		●			●	
Mixed relay										●			
Track cycling
Men's 1 km time trial	●	●			●								
Men's individual pursuit	●	●	●	●	●	●							
Women's 500m time trial		●			●								
Women's 1000m time trial	●												
Women's individual pursuit	●	●			●	●							
Mixed team sprint		●											

- B: Blind or partially sighted, tandem bicycle
- H: Handcycle
- T: Tricycle
- C: Standard bicycle, with modifications

== Participating nations ==
235 cyclists from 45 nations competed.

- Argentina (4)
- Australia (12)
- Austria (4)
- Belgium (7)
- Brazil (4)
- Canada (11)
- China (11)
- Colombia (6)
- Costa Rica (1)
- Cuba (1)
- Czech Republic (8)
- Denmark (2)
- Dominican Republic (1)
- Estonia (1)
- Finland (2)
- France (5)
- Germany (14)
- Ghana (1)
- Great Britain (15)
- Greece (3)
- Hungary (1)
- Iran (1)
- Ireland (7)
- Israel (1)
- Italy (12)
- Japan (4)
- Luxembourg (2)
- Malaysia (2)
- Netherlands (13)
- New Zealand (6)
- Norway (1)
- Peru (1)
- Poland (8)
- Portugal (2)
- Romania (2)
- Slovakia (4)
- Slovenia (1)
- South Africa (6)
- South Korea (3)
- Spain (9)
- Sweden (4)
- Switzerland (7)
- Ukraine (1)
- United States (22)
- Venezuela (2)

== Medal summary ==
As at the Olympic Games, Great Britain had a clear lead in the medal table based on dominance within the velodrome, particularly in the female events where Kadeena Cox became the first British paralympian in 32 years to win golds in two different sports at the same Games, and Sarah Storey confirmed herself as the most successful female paralympian from Great Britain, overtaking the record set by fellow peer Tanni Grey-Thompson.

On the road, Germany, the Netherlands and Italy were dominant, with racing driver turned handcyclist Alex Zanardi winning two gold medals and a silver to add to an identical haul from London in 2012. The United States, Australia and China also won more than ten medals each across the 50 events.

=== Medal table ===
after 50 of 50 events

Key

* Host nation (Brazil)

Rank	Nation	Gold	Silver	Bronze	Total
1	Great Britain (GBR)	12	3	6	21
2	Germany (GER)	8	3	4	15
3	Netherlands (NED)	5	5	6	16
4	Italy (ITA)	5	2	5	12
5	United States (USA)	4	9	5	18
6	Australia (AUS)	3	7	3	13
7	China (CHN)	3	3	4	10
8	Poland (POL)	2	3	0	5
9	Ireland (IRL)	2	2	1	5
10	Slovakia (SVK)	2	1	1	4
11	Ukraine (UKR)	2	0	0	2
12	Canada (CAN)	1	3	5	9
13	South Africa (RSA)	1	0	0	1
14	Austria (AUT)	0	2	0	2
14	Japan (JPN)	0	2	0	2
16	Spain (ESP)	0	1	2	3
17	Belgium (BEL)	0	1	1	2
17	Brazil (BRA)*	0	1	1	2
17	New Zealand (NZL)	0	1	1	2
20	South Korea (KOR)	0	1	0	1
21	Colombia (COL)	0	0	3	3
22	France (FRA)	0	0	1	1
22	Switzerland (SUI)	0	0	1	1
Totals (23 entries)		50	50	50	150

=== Road cycling ===
==== Men's events ====
Event	Class	Gold	Silver	Bronze
Time trial	B	Steve Bate; Great Britain	Vincent Ter Schure; Netherlands	Kieran Modra; Australia
Time trial	H2	Luca Mazzone; Italy	Will Groulx; United States	Brian Sheridan; United States
Time trial	H3	Vittorio Podestà; Italy	Walter Ablinger; Austria	Charles Moreau; Canada
Time trial	H4	Rafał Wilk; Poland	Thomas Fruhwirth; Austria	Vico Merklein; Germany
Time trial	H5	Alessandro Zanardi; Italy	Stuart Tripp; Australia	Oscar Sanchez; United States
Time trial	C1	Michael Teuber; Germany	Ross Wilson; Canada	Giancarlo Masini; Italy
Time trial	C2	Tristen Chernove; Canada	Colin Lynch; Ireland	Liang Guihua; China
Time trial	C3	Eoghan Clifford; Ireland	Masaki Fujita; Japan	Michael Sametz; Canada
Time trial	C4	Jozef Metelka; Slovakia	Kyle Bridgwood; Australia	Patrik Kuril; Slovakia
Time trial	C5	Yehor Dementyev; Ukraine	Alistair Donohoe; Australia	Lauro César Chaman; Brazil
Time trial	T1–2	Hans-Peter Durst; Germany	Ryan Boyle; United States	David Stone; Great Britain
Road race	B	Vincent Ter Schure; Netherlands	Ignacio Ávila; Spain	Steve Bate; Great Britain
Road race	H2	Will Groulx; United States	Luca Mazzone; Italy	Tobias Fankhauser; Switzerland
Road race	H3	Paolo Cecchetto; Italy	Maximilian Weber; Germany	Charles Moreau; Canada
Road race	H4	Vico Merklein; Germany	Rafał Wilk; Poland	Joël Jeannot; France
Road race	H5	Ernst van Dyk; South Africa	Alessandro Zanardi; Italy	Jetze Plat; Netherlands
Road race	C1-3	Steffen Warias; Germany	Kris Bosmans; Belgium	Fabio Anobile; Italy
Road race	C4-5	Daniel Abraham Gebru; Netherlands	Lauro César Chaman; Brazil	Andrea Tarlao; Italy
Road race	T1–2	Hans-Peter Durst; Germany	David Stone; Great Britain	Néstor Ayala Ayala; Colombia

==== Women's events ====
Event	Class	Gold	Silver	Bronze
Time trial	B	Katie George Dunlevy; Ireland	Yurie Kanuma; Japan	Lora Turnham; Great Britain
Time trial	H1–3	Karen Darke; Great Britain	Alicia Dana; United States	Francesca Porcellato; Italy
Time trial	H4–5	Dorothee Vieth; Germany	Andrea Eskau; Germany	Laura de Vaan; Netherlands
Time trial	C1–3	Alyda Norbruis; Netherlands	Denise Schindler; Germany	Zeng Sini; China
Time trial	C4	Shawn Morelli; United States	Megan Fisher; United States	Susan Powell; Australia
Time trial	C5	Sarah Storey; Great Britain	Anna Harkowska; Poland	Samantha Bosco; United States
Time trial	T1–2	Carol Cooke; Australia	Jill Walsh; United States	Shelley Gautier; Canada
Road race	B	Iwona Podkościelna; Poland	Katie George Dunlevy; Ireland	Emma Foy; New Zealand
Road race	H1-4	Christiane Reppe; Germany	Lee Do-yeon; South Korea	Francesca Porcellato; Italy
Road race	H5	Andrea Eskau; Germany	Laura de Vaan; Netherlands	Jennette Jansen; Netherlands
Road race	C1-3	Jamie Whitmore; United States	Zeng Sini; China	Denise Schindler; Germany
Road race	C4-5	Sarah Storey; Great Britain	Anna Harkowska; Poland	Crystal Lane; Great Britain
Road race	T1–2	Carol Cooke; Australia	Jill Walsh; United States	Jana Majunke; Germany

==== Mixed events ====
Event	Class	Gold	Silver	Bronze
Team Relay	H2-5 relay	Italy; Vittorio Podesta; Luca Mazzone; Alessandro Zanardi	United States; William Lachenauer; Will Groulx; Oscar Sanchez	Belgium; Jean-François Deberg; Christophe Hindricq; Jonas Van de Steene

=== Track cycling ===
==== Men's events ====
Event	Class	Gold	Silver	Bronze
1 km time trial	B	Tristan Bangma; Netherlands	Neil Fachie; Great Britain	Kai-Christian Kruse; Germany
1 km time trial	C1–3	Li Zhangyu; China	Arnoud Nijhuis; Netherlands	Tristen Chernove; Canada
1 km time trial	C4–5	Jody Cundy; Great Britain	Jozef Metelka; Slovakia	Alfonso Cabello; Spain
Individual pursuit	B	Steve Bate; Great Britain	Vincent ter Schure; Netherlands	Stephen de Vries; Netherlands
Individual pursuit	C1	Li Zhangyu; China	Ross Wilson; Canada	Arnoud Nijhuis; Netherlands
Individual pursuit	C2	Liang Guihua; China	Tristen Chernove; Canada	Louis Rolfe; Great Britain
Individual pursuit	C3	David Nicholas; Australia	Joseph Berenyi; United States	Eoghan Clifford; Ireland
Individual pursuit	C4	Jozef Metelka; Slovakia	Kyle Bridgwood; Australia	Diego Dueñas; Colombia
Individual pursuit	C5	Yegor Dementyev; Ukraine	Alistair Donohoe; Australia	Edwin Fabián Mátiz Ruiz; Colombia

==== Women's events ====
Event	Class	Gold	Silver	Bronze
Time trial	C1–3 (500 m)	Alyda Norbruis; Netherlands	Amanda Reid; Australia	Song Zhenling; China
Time trial	C4–5 (500 m)	Kadeena Cox; Great Britain	Zhou Jufang; China	Ruan Jianping; China
Time trial	B (1 km)	Sophie Thornhill; Great Britain	Larissa Klaassen; Netherlands	Jessica Gallagher; Australia
Individual pursuit	B	Lora Turnham; Great Britain	Emma Foy; New Zealand	Sophie Thornhill; Great Britain
Individual pursuit	C1–3	Megan Giglia; Great Britain	Jamie Whitmore; United States	Alyda Norbruis; Netherlands
Individual pursuit	C4	Shawn Morelli; United States	Susan Powell; Australia	Megan Fisher; United States
Individual pursuit	C5	Sarah Storey; Great Britain	Crystal Lane; Great Britain	Samantha Bosco; United States

==== Mixed events ====
Event	Class	Gold	Silver	Bronze
Team sprint	C1–5	Great Britain; Louis Rolfe; Jon-Allan Butterworth; Jody Cundy	China; Xie Hao; Wei Guoping; Liu Xinyang	Spain; Amador Granados; Eduardo Santas; Alfonso Cabello

== See also ==
- Cycling at the 2016 Summer Olympics
