= World and Paralympic records set at the 2016 Summer Paralympics =

The following records were set in various events at the 2016 Summer Paralympics in Rio de Janeiro. The records listed include those broken in a later round of the event.

== Paralympic and world records set by sport ==
=== Athletics ===
Event	Class	Date	Round	Athlete(s)	Nation	Time or distance	Record	Ref
Men's 100 metres	T11	11 September	Final	David Brown (Guide: Jerome Avery)	United States	10.99	PR	
Men's 100 metres	T33	10 September	Final	Ahmad Almutairi	Kuwait	16.61	PR	
Men's 100 metres	T34	11 September	Heats	Rheed McCracken	Australia	15.50	PR	
Men's 100 metres	T34	11 September	Heats	Walid Ktila	Tunisia	15.44	PR	
Men's 100 metres	T34	12 September	Final	Walid Ktila	Tunisia	15.14	PR	
Men's 100 metres	T35	9 September	Heats	Ihor Tsvietov	Ukraine	12.22	WR, PR	
Men's 100 metres	T36	10 September	Final	Mohamad Ridzuan Mohamad Puzi	Malaysia	12.07	PR	
Men's 100 metres	T37	10 September	Heats	Mateus Evangelista Cardoso	Brazil	11.47	PR	
Men's 100 metres	T37	10 September	Heats	Charl Du Toit	South Africa	11.42	WR, PR	
Men's 100 metres	T38	13 September	Final	Hu Jianwen	China	10.74	WR, PR	
Men's 100 metres	T43–44	8 September	Heats	Jonnie Peacock (T44)	Great Britain	10.81	PR	
Men's 100 metres	T43–44	8 September	Heats	Liam Malone (T43)	New Zealand	10.90	PR	
Men's 100 metres	T43–44	9 September	Final	Jonnie Peacock (T44)	Great Britain	10.81	PR	
Men's 100 metres	T45–47	10 September	Heats	Petrucio Ferreira Dos Santos (T47)	Brazil	10.67	WR, PR	
Men's 100 metres	T45–47	11 September	Final	Petrucio Ferreira Dos Santos (T47)	Brazil	10.57	WR, PR	
Men's 100 metres	T51	13 September	Final	Peter Genyn	Belgium	21.15	PR	
Men's 100 metres	T53	9 September	Heats	Arlosvaldo Fernandes Silva	Brazil	14.69	PR	
Men's 100 metres	T53	9 September	Heats	Pongsakorn Paeyo	Thailand	14.56	PR	
Men's 100 metres	T53	9 September	Heats	Brent Lakatos	Canada	14.43	PR	
Women's 100 metres	T11	9 September	Semifinals	Liu Cuiqing (Guide: Donglin Xu)	China	11.96	WR, PR	
Women's 100 metres	T11	9 September	Semifinals	Libby Clegg (Guide: Chris Clarke)	Great Britain	11.91	WR, PR	
Women's 100 metres	T12	8 September	Heats	Omara Durand (Guide: Yuniol Kindelan)	Cuba	11.58	PR	
Women's 100 metres	T12	9 September	Semifinals	Omara Durand (Guide: Yuniol Kindelan)	Cuba	11.55	PR	
Women's 100 metres	T12	9 September	Final	Omara Durand (Guide: Yuniol Kindelan)	Cuba	11.40	WR, PR	
Women's 100 metres	T13	10 September	Heats	Leilia Adzhametova	Ukraine	11.86	WR, PR	
Women's 100 metres	T13	10 September	Final	Leilia Adzhametova	Ukraine	11.79	WR, PR	
Women's 100 metres	T33–34	10 September	Final	Hannah Cockroft (T34)	Great Britain	17.42	PR	
Women's 100 metres	T37	8 September	Heats	Mandy Francois-Elie	France	13.69	PR	
Women's 100 metres	T37	8 September	Heats	Georgina Hermitage	Great Britain	13.39	WR, PR	
Women's 100 metres	T37	9 September	Final	Georgina Hermitage	Great Britain	13.13	WR, PR	
Women's 100 metres	T38	9 September	Heats	Veronica Hipolito	Brazil	12.84	PR	
Women's 100 metres	T38	9 September	Heats	Sophie Hahn	Great Britain	12.62	PR	
Women's 100 metres	T38	9 September	Final	Sophie Hahn	Great Britain	12.62	PR	
Women's 100 metres	T53	8 September	Heats	Lisha Huang	China	16.19	WR, PR	
Men's 200 metres	T11	14 September	Semifinals	Ananias Shikongo (Guide: Even Tjiviju)	Namibia	22.48	PR	
Men's 200 metres	T35	11 September	Heats	Ihor Tsvietov	Ukraine	25.64	PR	
Men's 200 metres	T35	12 September	Final	Ihor Tsvietov	Ukraine	25.11	PR	
Men's 200 metres	T42	10 September	Heats	Richard Whitehead	Great Britain	23.07	PR	
Men's 200 metres	T43–44	12 September	Heats	David Prince (T44)	United States	22.42	PR	
Men's 200 metres	T43–44	12 September	Final	Liam Malone (T43)	New Zealand	21.06	PR	
Men's 200 metres	T43–44	12 September	Final	David Prince (T44)	United States	22.01	PR	
Women's 200 metres	T11	13 September	Final	Libby Clegg (Guide: Chris Clarke)	Great Britain	24.51	PR	
Women's 200 metres	T12	11 September	Heats	Elena Chebanu (Guide: Hakim Ibrahimov)	Azerbaijan	24.16	PR	
Women's 200 metres	T12	11 September	Heats	Omara Durand (Guide: Yuniol Kindelan)	Cuba	23.67	PR	
Women's 200 metres	T12	12 September	Final	Omara Durand (Guide: Yuniol Kindelan)	Cuba	23.05	PR	
Men's 400 metres	T20	9 September	Final	Daniel Martins	Brazil	47.22	WR, PR	
Women's 400 metres	T37	12 September	Heats	Georgina Hermitage	Great Britain	1:03.44	PR	
Women's 400 metres	T37	13 September	Final	Georgina Hermitage	Great Britain	1:00.53	WR, PR	
Women's 400 metres	T38	14 September	Final	Kadeena Cox	Great Britain	1:00.71	WR, PR	
Women's 400 metres	T43–44	12 September	Final	Marie-Amelie Le Fur (T44)	France	59.27	WR, PR	
Women's 400 metres	T51–52	10 September	Final	Michelle Stilwell (T52)	Canada	1:05.43	PR	
Women's 400 metres	T53	11 September	Final	Zhou Hongzhuan	China	54.43	WR, PR	
Men's 800 metres	T33–34	13 September	Heats	Walid Ktila	Tunisia	1:46.28	PR	
Men's 800 metres	T33–34	13 September	Heats	Mohamed Alhammadi	United Arab Emirates	1:44.96	PR	
Men's 800 metres	T33–34	14 September	Final	Mohamed Alhammadi	United Arab Emirates	1:40.24	PR	
Men's 1500 metres	T12–13	13 September	Final	Abdellatif Baka (T13)	Algeria	3:48.29	WR, PR	(Note: The first four finalists in the T13 1500m men's final at the 2016 Summer Paralympics all finished faster than the winning time (3:50.00) of gold medallist Matthew Centrowitz Jr. at the 2016 Summer Olympics.)
Men's discus throw	F37	8 September	Final	Khusniddin Norbekov	Uzbekistan	59.75 m	WR, PR	
Men's shot put	F20	11 September	Final	Muhammad Ziyad Zolkefli	Malaysia	16.84 m	WR	
Men's shot put	F32	8 September	Final	Athanasios Konstantinidis	Greece	10.39 m	WR, PR	
Women's shot put	F56	8 September	Final	Nadia Medjmedj	Algeria	9.92 m	WR, PR	
Men's javelin throw	F43	9 September	Final	Akeem Stewart	Trinidad and Tobago	57.32	WR, PR	
Men's javelin throw	F46	14 September	Final	Devendra Jhajharia	India	63.97	WR, PR	
Men's long jump	T20	11 September	Final	Abdul Latif Romly	Malaysia	7.60	WR, PR	

=== Cycling (track) ===
Event	Class	Date	Round	Athlete(s)	Nation	Time	Record
Men's individual pursuit	B	8 September	Qualification	Steve Bate (Pilot: Adam Duggleby)	Great Britain	4:08.146	WR, PR
Men's individual pursuit	C1	9 September	Qualification	Li Zhangyu	China	3:50.373	WR, PR
Men's individual pursuit	C2	9 September	Qualification	Liang Guihua	China	3:42.916	PR
Men's individual pursuit	C3	9 September	Qualification	David Nicholas	Australia	3:32.336	PR
Men's individual pursuit	C4	10 September	Qualification	Jozef Metelka	Slovakia	4:29.112	PR
Women's individual pursuit	B	11 September	Qualification	Lora Turnham (Pilot: Corrine Hall)	Great Britain	3:27.460	PR
Women's individual pursuit	C1–3	8 September	Qualification	Megan Giglia (C3)	Great Britain	4.03.544	WR, PR
Women's individual pursuit	C1–3	8 September	Qualification	Alyda Norbruis (C2)	Netherlands	4:12.030	PR
Women's individual pursuit	C1–3	8 September	Bronze medal race	Alyda Norbruis (C2)	Netherlands	4:10.654	PR
Women's individual pursuit	C4	8 September	Qualification	Shawn Morelli	United States	3.57.741	PR
Women's individual pursuit	C5	8 September	Qualification	Sarah Storey	Great Britain	3.31.394	WR, PR
Men's 1 km time trial	B	11 September	Final	Tristan Bangma (Pilot: Teun Mulder)	Netherlands	59.822	PR
Men's 1 km time trial	C1–3	10 September	Final	Li Zhangyu (C1)	China	1:06.678	WR, PR
Men's 1 km time trial	C1–3	10 September	Final	Tristen Chernove (C2)	Canada	1:09.583	PR
Men's 1 km time trial	C4–5	9 September	Final	Jody Cundy (C4)	Great Britain	1:02.473	PR
Men's 1 km time trial	C4–5	9 September	Final	Alfonso Cabello Llamas (C5)	Spain	1:04.494	PR
Women's 1 km time trial	B	9 September	Final	Sophie Thornhill (Pilot: Helen Scott)	Great Britain	1:06.283	PR
Women's 500 m time trial	C1–3	10 September	Final	Alyda Norbruis (C2)	Netherlands	39.908	WR, PR
Women's 500 m time trial	C1–3	10 September	Final	Megan Giglia (C3)	Great Britain	41.252	WR, PR
Women's 500 m time trial	C4–5	10 September	Final	Kadeena Cox (C4)	Great Britain	34.598	WR, PR
Women's 500 m time trial	C4–5	10 September	Final	Zhou Jufang (C5)	China	36.004	WR, PR
Mixed team sprint	C1–5	10 September	Qualification	Louis Rolfe; Jon-Allan Butterworth; Jody Cundy	Great Britain	49.004	WR, PR
Mixed team sprint	C1–5	10 September	Final	Louis Rolfe; Jon-Allan Butterworth; Jody Cundy	Great Britain	48.635	WR, PR

=== Powerlifting ===
Event	Date	Athlete	Nation	Weight (kg)	Record
Men's 49 kg	8 September	Lê Văn Công	Vietnam	181	WR, PR
Women's 41 kg	8 September	Nazmiye Muratlı	Turkey	104	WR, PR
Women's 45 kg	9 September	Hu Dandan	China	107	WR, PR
Men's 54 kg	9 September	Roland Ezuruike	Nigeria	200	PR
Men's 59 kg	9 September	Sherif Osman	Egypt	203	WR, PR
Women's 50 kg	10 September	Lidiia Soloviova	Ukraine	107	PR
Women's 55 kg	10 September	Amalia Perez	Mexico	130	WR, PR
Men's 65 kg	10 September	Paul Kehinde	Nigeria	220	WR, PR
Women's 61 kg	11 September	Lucy Ejike	Nigeria	142	WR, PR
Men's 72 kg	11 September	Rasool Mohsin	Iraq	227	WR, PR
Women's 67 kg	11 September	Yujiao Tan	China	138.5	WR, PR
Women's 73 kg	12 September	Souhad Ghazouani	France	140	PR
Women's 79 kg	12 September	Bose Omolayo	Nigeria	138	WR, PR
Men's 80 kg	12 September	Majid Farzin	Iran	240	WR, PR
Women's 86 kg	13 September	Randa Mahmoud	Egypt	130	PR

=== Rowing ===
Event	Date	Round	Athlete(s)	Nation	Time	Record
Women's single sculls	9 September	Heats	Lili Wang	China	5:21.04	PR
Women's single sculls	11 September	Final	Rachel Morris	Great Britain	5:13.69	PR
Men's single sculls	9 September	Heats	Roman Polianskyi	Ukraine	4:44.70	PR
Men's single sculls	11 September	Final	Roman Polianskyi	Ukraine	4:39.56	PR
Mixed double sculls	9 September	Heats	Lauren Rowles; Laurence Whiteley	Great Britain	3.52.16	WR, PR

=== Shooting ===
Event	Class	Date	Round	Athlete	Nation	Points	Record
Men's 10 metre air rifle standing	SH1	8 September	Qualification	Jim Ho Park	South Korea	625.3	PR
Men's 10 metre air rifle standing	SH1	8 September	Final	Dong Chao	China	205.8	FPR
Women's 10 metre air rifle standing	SH1	8 September	Qualification	Cuiping Zhang	China	413.4	PR
Women's 10 metre air rifle standing	SH1	8 September	Final	Veronika Vadovičová	Slovakia	207.8	FPR
Mixed 10 metre air rifle standing	SH2	10 September	Qualification	Veselka Pevec	Slovenia	634.9	PR
Mixed 10 metre air rifle standing	SH2	10 September	Final	Veselka Pevec	Slovenia	211.0	FPR
Women's 10 metre air pistol	SH1	9 September	Final	Sareh Javanmardidodmani	Iran	193.4	FPR
Men's 10 metre air pistol	SH1	9 September	Final	Chao Yang	China	198.2	FPR
Mixed 10 metre air rifle prone	SH1	10 September	Qualification	Veronika Vadovicova	Slovakia	636.7	PR
Mixed 10 metre air rifle prone	SH1	10 September	Final	Veronika Vadovicova	Slovakia	212.5	FPR
Men's 10 metre air rifle prone	SH2	13 September	Qualification	Vasyl Kovalchuk	Ukraine	637.1	PR
Men's 10 metre air rifle prone	SH2	13 September	Final	Vasyl Kovalchuk	Ukraine	211.7	FPR
Men's 50 metre rifle 3 positions	SH1	12 September	Qualification	Laslo Suranji	Serbia	1165-57x	PR
Men's 50 metre rifle 3 positions	SH1	12 September	Final	Laslo Suranji	Serbia	453.7	FPR
Women's 50 metre rifle 3 positions	SH1	13 September	Qualification	Cuiping Zhang	China	583-24x	PR
Women's 50 metre rifle 3 positions	SH1	13 September	Final	Cuiping Zhang	China	455.4	FPR

=== Swimming ===
Event	Class	Date	Round	Athlete(s)	Nation	Time	Record
Men's 400 metre freestyle	S8	8 September	Final	Oliver Hynd	Great Britain	4.21.89	WR, PR
Women's 400 metre freestyle	S8	8 September	Final	Lakeisha Patterson	Australia	4.40.33	WR, PR
Men's 100 metre backstroke	S6	8 September	Final	Tao Zheng	China	1.10.84	WR, PR
Men's 100 metre backstroke	S14	8 September	Final	Kook Lee In	South Korea	59.82	PR
Men's 100 metre backstroke	S2	9 September	Heats	Benying Liu	China	1.58.29	WR, PR
Men's 100 metre backstroke	S2	9 September	Final	Liankang Zou	China	1.45.25	WR, PR
Men's 100 metre backstroke	S11	9 September	Final	Dymitro Zalevskyi	Ukraine	1:06.66	WR, PR
Men's 100 metre backstroke	S1	9 September	Final	Hennadii Boiko	Ukraine	2.08.01	WR, PR
Women's 100 metre backstroke	S7	8 September	Heats	Ke Liting	China	1.22.72	PR
Women's 100 metre backstroke	S14	8 September	Heats	Bethany Firth	Great Britain	1.04.53	WR, PR
Women's 100 metre backstroke	S14	8 September	Final	Bethany Firth	Great Britain	1.04.05	WR, PR
Women's 100 metre backstroke	S11	9 September	Heats	Mary Fisher	New Zealand	1:18.68	PR
Women's 100 metre backstroke	S11	9 September	Final	Mary Fisher	New Zealand	1.17.96	WR, PR
Women's 100 metre backstroke	S2	9 September	Final	Xiu Pin Yip	Singapore	2:07.09	WR, PR
Men's 100 metre breaststroke	S6	8 September	Heats	Jia Hongguang	China	1.12.27	WR, PR
Women's 100 metre breaststroke	S6	8 September	Heats	Lingling Song	China	1.24.66	WR, PR
Women's 100 metre breaststroke	S6	8 September	Final	Lingling Song	China	1.21.43	WR, PR
Women's 100 metre breaststroke	S9	8 September	Heats	Lisa Kruger	Netherlands	1.15.47	WR, PR
Men's 100 metre butterfly	S13	8 September	Final	Ihar Boki	Belarus	53.85	WR, PR
Men's 100 metre butterfly	S8	9 September	Final	Song Maodang	China	59.19	WR, PR
Women's 100 metre butterfly	S13	8 September	Heats	Amilova Fotimakhon	Uzbekistan	1.04.72	WR, PR
Women's 100 metre butterfly	S13	8 September	Final	Rebecca Meyers	United States	1.03.25	WR, PR
Women's 100 metre butterfly	S8	9 September	Final	Kateryna Istomina	Ukraine	1:09.04	PR
Women's 100 metre freestyle	S3	8 September	Final	Zulfiya Gabidulina	Kazakhstan	1.30.07	WR, PR
Men's 100 metre freestyle	S11	15 September	Final	Brad Snyder	United States	56.15	WR, PR
Men's 50 metre freestyle	S7	9 September	Final	Shiyun Pan	China	27.35	WR, PR
Women's 50 metre freestyle	S7	9 September	Heats	McKenzie Coan	United States	32.57	PR
Women's 50 metre freestyle	S7	9 September	Final	McKenzie Coan	United States	32.42	PR
Women's 50 metre backstroke	S2	9 September	Final	Xiu Pin Yip	Singapore	59.38	WR, PR
Men's 50 metre butterfly	S6	9 September	Final	Qing Xu	China	29.89	WR, PR
Women's 50 metre butterfly	S6	9 September	Final	Ellie Robinson	Great Britain	29.89	PR
Mixed 4 x 50 metre freestyle relay	20 pts	9 September	Final	Qiuping Peng; Shengnan Jiang; Wenpan Huang; Qing Xu	China	2.18.20	WR, PR

== See also ==
- World and Olympic records set at the 2016 Summer Olympics
