= Cycling at the 2024 Summer Paralympics – Men's road race C4–5 =

Men's road race C4-5 at the XVII Paralympic Games
- Venue: Clichy-sous-Bois
- Dates: 6 September 2024
- Competitors: 29 from 22 nations
- Winning time: 2:18:59

Medalists
1st place, gold medalist(s)		Yehor Dementyev	Ukraine
2nd place, silver medalist(s)		Kévin Le Cunff	France
3rd place, bronze medalist(s)		Martin van de Pol	Netherlands

The men's road race C4-5 cycling event at the 2024 Summer Paralympics took place on 6 September 2024 in Clichy-sous-Bois in Seine-Saint-Denis, Paris, France. 29 riders competed in the event.

The C4-5 classification covers two classes described as follows:

- C4: mild hemiplegic or diplegic spasticity; mild athetosis or ataxia; unilateral below knee or bilateral below elbow amputation, etc.
- C5: mild monoplegic spasticity; unilateral arm amputation (above or below elbow), etc.

== Schedule ==
F	Finals

Men's Road Race
Event↓/Date →	5 September	6 September	7 September
B		F	
H1-2	F		
H3	F		
H4	F		
H5	F		
C1-3			F
C4-5		F	
T1-2			F

== Results ==
The event took place on 6 September 2024 at 9:30.

Rank	Rider	Nationality	Class	Time	Deficit	Notes
1st place, gold medalist(s)	Yehor Dementyev	Ukraine	C5	2:18:59	–	
2nd place, silver medalist(s)	Kévin Le Cunff	France	C4	2:18:59	+00:00	s.t.
3rd place, bronze medalist(s)	Martin van de Pol	Netherlands	C5	2:18:59	+00:00	s.t.
4	Gatien Le Rousseau	France	C4	2:18:59	+00:00	s.t.
5	Lauro Chaman	Brazil	C5	2:25:58	+06:59	
6	Alistair Donohoe	Australia	C5	2:25:58	+06:59	s.t.
7	Elouan Gardon	United States	C5	2:25:58	+06:59	s.t.
8	Dorian Foulon	France	C5	2:25:58	+06:59	s.t.
9	Daniel Abraham	Netherlands	C5	2:26:00	+07:01	
10	Damián Ramos	Spain	C4	2:26:07	+07:08	
11	José Rodríguez Hernandez	Dominican Republic	C4	2:32:24	+13:25	
12	Louis Clincke	Belgium	C4	2:32:24	+13:25	s.t.
13	Franz-Josef Lässer	Austria	C5	2:32:35	+13:36	
14	Zsombor Wermeser	Hungary	C5	2:34:09	+15:10	
15	Timothy Zemp	Switzerland	C4	2:39:03	+20:04	
16	Hernán Moya	Chile	C5	2:39:13	+20:14	
17	Ronan Grimes	Ireland	C4	2:51:20	+32:21	
18	Oskars Gailiss	Latvia	C4	-1 Lap	–	
19	Azimbek Abdullaev	Uzbekistan	C5	-1 Lap	–	
20	Muhammad Fadli Immammuddin	Indonesia	C4	-1 Lap	–	
21	Edwin Fabián Mátiz Ruiz	Colombia	C5	-1 Lap	–	
22	Ahmed Albedwawi	United Arab Emirates	C5	-1 Lap	–	
	Archie Atkinson	Great Britain	C4	DNF	–	
	Jozef Metelka	Slovakia	C4	DNF	–	
	Blaine Hunt	Great Britain	C5	DNF	–	
	Korey Boddington	Australia	C4	DNF	–	
DNS	Carol-Eduard Novak	Romania	C4	DNS		
DNS	Patrik Kuril	Slovakia	C4	DNS		
DNS	Carlos Vargas	Colombia	C5	DNS		

s.t. Same time as rider above
