= Cycling at the 2020 Summer Paralympics – Men's road race C4–5 =

Men's road race C4–5 at the XVI Paralympic Games
- Venue: Fuji Speedway
- Dates: 3 September 2021
- Competitors: 24 from 16 nations
- Winning time: 2:14:49

Medalists
1st place, gold medalist(s)		Kévin Le Cunff	France
2nd place, silver medalist(s)		Yegor Dementyev	Ukraine
3rd place, bronze medalist(s)		Daniel Abraham	Netherlands

The men's road race C4-5 cycling event at the 2020 Summer Paralympics took place on 3 September 2021, at the Fuji Speedway in Shizuoka Prefecture. 14 riders competed in the event.

The event covers the following two classifications, that all use standard bicycles:

- C4: cyclists with mild hemiplegic or diplegic spasticity; mild athetosis or ataxia; unilateral below-knee or bilateral below elbow amputation, etc. tetraplegics with severe upper limb impairment to the C6 vertebra.
- C5: cyclists with mild monoplegic spasticity; unilateral arm amputation (above or below elbow), etcetera.

== Results ==
The event took place on 3 September 2021 at 9:30.

Rank	Rider	Nationality	Class	Time	Deficit
1st place, gold medalist(s)	Kévin Le Cunff	France	C5	2:14:49	
2nd place, silver medalist(s)	Yegor Dementyev	Ukraine	C5	2:15:11	+0.22
3rd place, bronze medalist(s)	Daniel Abraham	Netherlands	C5	2:15:20	+0.31
4	Lauro Chaman	Brazil	C5	2:17:11	+2:22
5	Alistair Donohoe	Australia	C5	2:19:43	+4:54
6	George Peasgood	Great Britain	C4	2:20:11	+5:22
7	Patrik Kuril	Slovakia	C4	2:22:35	+7:46
8	Andrea Tarlao	Italy	C5	s.t.	
9	Pierpaolo Addesi	Italy	C5	2:23:53	+9:04
10	Sergei Pudov	RPC	C4	2:27:56	+13:07
11	Ronan Grimes	Ireland	C4	2:29:21	+14:32
12	Ondrej Strečko	Slovakia	C5	2:30:07	+15:18
13	Edwin Fabián Mátiz Ruiz	Colombia	C5	2:33:34	+18:45
14	Zsombor Wermeser	Hungary	C5	2:34:30	+19:41
15	Diego Germán Dueñas	Colombia	C4	2:39:26	+24:37
16	Cody Jung	United States	C4	s.t.	
17	Andre Luiz Grizante	Brazil	C4	-1 LAP	
18	Walter Grant-Stuart	Guyana	C5	-1 LAP	
	Jozef Metelka	Slovakia	C4	DNF	
	Mahdi Mohammadi	Iran	C5	DNF	
	Christopher Murphy	United States	C5	DNF	
	Dorian Foulon	France	C5	DNF	
	Carol-Eduard Novak	Romania	C4	DNF	
	Alfonso Cabello	Spain	C5	DNF	
	Pablo Jaramillo Gallardo	Spain	C5	DNF	

s.t. Same time
