= Cycling at the 2024 Summer Paralympics – Men's road time trial C4 =

Men's road time trial C4 at the XVII Paralympic Games
- Venue: Clichy-sous-Bois
- Dates: 4 September
- Competitors: 13 from 11 nations
- Winning time: 36:46.49

Medalists
| 1st place, gold medalist(s) | | Kévin Le Cunff | France |
| 2nd place, silver medalist(s) | | Gatien Le Rousseau | France |
| 3rd place, bronze medalist(s) | | Damian Ramos Sanchez | Spain |

The Men's time trial C4 road cycling event at the 2024 Summer Paralympics took place on 4 September 2024, at Clichy-sous-Bois, Paris. 13 riders competed in the event.

The C4 classification is for cyclists described as follows:

C4: mild hemiplegic or diplegic spasticity; mild athetosis or ataxia; unilateral below knee or bilateral below elbow amputation, etc.

== Results ==
| Rank | Rider | Nationality | Class | Time | Deficit |
|---|---|---|---|---|---|
| 1st place, gold medalist(s) | Kévin Le Cunff | France | C4 | 36:46.49 | |
| 2nd place, silver medalist(s) | Gatien Le Rousseau | France | C4 | 37:18.38 | +0:31.89 |
| 3rd place, bronze medalist(s) | Damian Ramos Sanchez | Spain | C4 | 38:05.94 | +1:19.45 |
| 4 | Louis Clincke | Belgium | C4 | 38:22.70 | +1:36.21 |
| 5 | Archie Atkinson | Great Britain | C4 | 38:23.52 | +1:37.03 |
| 6 | Jozef Metelka | Slovakia | C4 | 38:42.52 | +1:56.03 |
| 7 | Timothy Zemp | Switzerland | C4 | 38:51.48 | +2:04.99 |
| 8 | Ronan Grimes | Ireland | C4 | 39:01.83 | +2:15.34 |
| 9 | Patrik Kuril | Slovakia | C4 | 40:47.86 | +4:01.37 |
| 10 | Carol-Eduard Novak | Romania | C4 | 40:52.10 | +4:05.61 |
| 11 | Jose Frank Rodriguez Hernandez | Dominican Republic | C4 | 43:23.39 | +6:36.90 |
| 12 | Muhammad Fadli Immammuddin | Indonesia | C4 | 43:29.58 | +6:43.09 |
| 13 | Oskars Gailiss | Latvia | C4 | 44:30.48 | +7:43.99 |
