= Cycling at the 2024 Summer Paralympics – Men's pursuit =

The men's individual pursuit track cycling events at the 2024 Summer Paralympics will take place between August 29 to 1 September 2024 at the Vélodrome National, Paris. Six events will take place in the men's event also over six classifications. The distances of C1, C2 and C3 classification events are 3000m. B, C4 and C5 events are raced over 4000m.

== Classification ==
Cyclists are given a classification depending on the type and extent of their disability. The classification system allows cyclists to compete against others with a similar level of function. The class number indicates the severity of impairment with "1" being most impaired.

Cycling classes are:

- B: Blind and visually impaired cyclists use a Tandem bicycle with a sighted pilot on the front
- C 1-5: Cyclists with an impairment that affects their legs, arms, and/or trunk but are capable of using a standard bicycle

== Medal table ==
* Host nation (France)

Rank	NPC	Gold	Silver	Bronze	Total
1	France*	2	0	1	3
2	Great Britain	1	3	1	5
3	China	1	1	0	2
4	Netherlands	1	0	0	1
4	Slovakia	1	0	0	1
6	Belgium	0	1	0	1
6	Ukraine	0	1	0	1
8	Canada	0	0	1	1
8	Italy	0	0	1	1
8	Spain	0	0	1	1
8	United States	0	0	1	1
Totals (11 entries)		6	6	6	18

== Medal summary ==
Classification	Gold		Silver		Bronze	
B	Tristan Bangma; Pilot: Patrick Bos; Netherlands	3:55.439	Stephen Bate; Pilot: Christopher Latham; Great Britain	3:57.652	Lorenzo Bernard; Pilot: Davide Plebani; Italy	4:04.613 ^{b.f.}
C1	Li Zhangyu; China		Liang Weicong; China	OVL	Ricardo Ten Argiles; Spain	3:45.152 ^{b.f.}
C2	Alexandre Leaute; France	3:26.015	Ewoud Vromant; Belgium	3:28.062	Matthew Robertson; Great Britain	3:30.497 ^{b.f.}
C3	Jaco van Gass; Great Britain	3:18.460	Finlay Graham; Great Britain	3:22.540	Alexandre Hayward; Canada	3:24.865 ^{b.f.}
C4	Jozef Metelka; Slovakia	4:27.920	Archie Atkinson; Great Britain	OVL	Gatien Le Rousseau; France	4:24.096 ^{b.f.}
C5	Dorian Foulon; France	4:16.158	Yehor Dementyev; Ukraine	4:17.770	Elouan Gardon; United States	4:18.880 ^{b.f.}
