= Cycling at the 2016 Summer Paralympics – Men's time trial =

The Men's time trial cycling events at the 2016 Summer Paralympics took place on September 17 at Rio Olympic Velodrome. Three events took place over six classifications. Both the C1-3 and C4-5 time trials were 'factored' events.

== Classification ==
Cyclists are given a classification depending on the type and extent of their disability. The classification system allows cyclists to compete against others with a similar level of function. The class number indicates the severity of impairment with "1" being most impaired.

Cycling classes for track cycling are:

- B: Blind and visually impaired cyclists use a Tandem bicycle with a sighted pilot on the front
- C 1-5: Cyclists with an impairment that affects their legs, arms and/or trunk but are capable of using a standard bicycle

== Men's time trials ==
=== B ===
Class	Gold	Silver	Bronze
B	Tristan Bangma; Netherlands	Neil Fachie; Great Britain	Kai-Christian Kruse; Germany

=== C1–3 ===
Class	Gold	Silver	Bronze
C1–3	Li Zhangyu; China	Arnoud Nijhuis; Netherlands	Tristen Chernove; Canada

=== C4–5 ===
Class	Gold	Silver	Bronze
C4–5	Jody Cundy; Great Britain	Jozef Metelka; Slovakia	Alfonso Cabello; Spain
