= Cycling at the 2024 Summer Paralympics – Men's pursuit C4 =

Men's individual pursuit C4 at the XVII Paralympic Games
- Venue: Vélodrome National
- Dates: 31 August 2024
- Competitors: 12 from 11 nations
- Winning time: 4:27.920

Medalists
1st place, gold medalist(s)		Jozef Metelka	Slovakia
2nd place, silver medalist(s)		Archie Atkinson	Great Britain
3rd place, bronze medalist(s)		Gatien Le Rousseau	France

The men's individual pursuit class C4 track cycling event at the 2024 Summer Paralympics took place on 31 August 2024 at the Vélodrome National.

== Competition format ==
The C category is for cyclists with a physical impairment (muscle power or range of motion, and impairments affecting the coordination) that prevents them from competing in able-bodied competition but still competes using a standard bicycle.

The competition starts with a qualifying round where it comprises a head-to-head race between the 12 cyclists. The 2 fastest cyclists in the qualifying would qualify to the gold medal final while the 3rd and 4th fastest will qualify to the bronze medal final where they will race head-to-head. The distance of this event is 4000 metres. The medal finals are also held on the same day as the qualifying.

== Schedule ==
All times are Central European Summer Time (UTC+2)

Date	Time	Round
31 August	11:02	Qualifying
31 August	14:52	Finals

== Results ==
=== Qualifying ===
Rank	Heat	Cyclist	Nation	Result	Notes
1	7	Archie Atkinson	Great Britain	4:17.700	QG, WR
2	7	Jozef Metelka	Slovakia	4:22.800	QG
3	6	Kévin Le Cunff	France	4:25.283	QB
4	5	Gatien Le Rousseau	France	4:25.366	QB
5	4	Ronan Grimes	Ireland	4:28.859	
6	6	Bryan Larsen	United States	4:30.690	
7	4	Carol-Eduard Novak	Romania	4:33.045	
8	5	Damián Ramos	Spain	4:35.156	
9	3	Timothy Zemp	Switzerland	4:39.881	
10	3	Fadli Immammuddin	Indonesia	4:51.817	
11	1	Oskars Gailišs	Latvia	5:09.932	
12	2	José Frank Rodríguez	Dominican Republic	5:17.462	

=== Finals ===
Rank	Cyclist	Nation	Result	Notes
Gold medal final
1st place, gold medalist(s)	Jozef Metelka	Slovakia	4:27.920	
2nd place, silver medalist(s)	Archie Atkinson	Great Britain	OVL	
Bronze medal final
3rd place, bronze medalist(s)	Gatien Le Rousseau	France	4:24.096	
4	Kévin Le Cunff	France	4:28.380	
