= Cycling at the 2020 Summer Paralympics – Men's road time trial C5 =

Men's road time trial C5 at the XVI Paralympic Games
- Venue: Fuji Speedway
- Dates: 31 August 2021
- Competitors: 15 from 13 nations
- Winning time: 42:46.45

Medalists
| 1st place, gold medalist(s) | | Daniel Abraham | Netherlands |
| 2nd place, silver medalist(s) | | Yegor Dementyev | Ukraine |
| 3rd place, bronze medalist(s) | | Alistair Donohoe | Australia |

The men's time trial class C5 road cycling event at the 2020 Summer Paralympics took place on 31 August 2021 at Fuji Speedway, Japan. 15 riders from 13 nations competed in this event.

The C5 classification is for cyclists with mild monoplegic spasticity; unilateral arm amputation (above or below elbow), etcetera.

== Results ==
The event took place on 31 August 2021, at 13:47:

| Rank | Rider | Nationality | Time | Deficit |
|---|---|---|---|---|
| 1st place, gold medalist(s) | Daniel Abraham | Netherlands | 42:46.45 | |
| 2nd place, silver medalist(s) | Yegor Dementyev | Ukraine | 43:19.11 | +32.66 |
| 3rd place, bronze medalist(s) | Alistair Donohoe | Australia | 43:36.80 | +50.35 |
| 4 | Lauro Chaman | Brazil | 43:44.37 | +57.92 |
| 5 | Kévin Le Cunff | France | 43:51.87 | +1:05.42 |
| 6 | Andrea Tarlao | Italy | 46:12.99 | +3:26.54 |
| 7 | Zsombor Wermeser | Hungary | 46:23.06 | +3:36.61 |
| 8 | Ondrej Strečko | Slovakia | 48:07.86 | +5:21.41 |
| 9 | Pierpaolo Addesi | Italy | 48:37.55 | +5:51.10 |
| 10 | Edwin Fabián Mátiz Ruiz | Colombia | 49:46.14 | +6:59.69 |
| 11 | Mahdi Mohammadi | Iran | 53:49.65 | +11:03.20 |
| 12 | Muhammad Hafiz Jamali | Malaysia | 1:01:35.78 | +18:49.33 |
| 13 | Walter Grant-Stuart | Guyana | 1:04:17.69 | +21:31.24 |
| | Zuhairie Ahmad Tarmizi | Malaysia | DNF | |
| | Dorian Foulon | France | DNF | |
