= Cycling at the 2016 Summer Paralympics – Mixed team sprint =

Cycling Paralympic

Cycling, Mixed team sprint at the XV Paralympic Games
- Paralympic track cycling
- Venue: Rio Olympic Velodrome
- Dates: 11 September
- Competitors: 32 (8 teams of four) from 8 nations

Medalists
| 1st place, gold medalist(s) | | Louis Rolfe; Jon-Allan Butterworth; Jody Cundy | Great Britain |
| 2nd place, silver medalist(s) | | Xie Hao; Wei Guoping; Liu Xinyang | China |
| 3rd place, bronze medalist(s) | | Amador Granados Alkorta; Eduardo Santas Asensio; Alfonso Cabello Llamas | Spain |

The Mixed team sprint track cycling event at the 2016 Summer Paralympics took place on the afternoon of 11 September at Rio Olympic Velodrome. 8 teams of four took part.

.

== Results : Team sprint ==
11 September 2016, Rio.

| Rank | Nation | Time | Notes |
|---|---|---|---|
| 1 | Great Britain; Louis Rolfe; Jon-Allan Butterworth; Jody Cundy | 49.004 | WR Q |
| 2 | China; Xie Hao; Wei Guoping; Liu Xinyang | 50.084 | Q |
| 3 | Spain; Amador Granados Alkorta; Eduardo Santas Asensio; Alfonso Cabello Llamas | 51.011 | Qb |
| 4 | United States; Jennifer Schuble; Joseph Berenyi; Chris Murphy | 52.212 | Qb |
| 5 | Czech Republic; Ivo Koblasa; Tomas Kajnar; Jiri Bouska | 54.520 | |
| 6 | Australia; Susan Powell; David Nicholas; Alistair Donohoe | 55.308 | |
| 7 | Colombia; Alvaro Galvis Becerra; Diego Duenas Gomez; Edwin Fabian Matiz Ruiz | 55.376 | |
| - | Japan; Shota Kawamoto; Masaki Fujita; Masashi Ishii | REL | |

== Finals ==
| Rank | Nation | Time | Notes |
Mixed team sprint : gold final
| 1st place, gold medalist(s) | Great Britain; Louis Rolfe; Jon-Allan Butterworth; Jody Cundy | 48.635 | WR |
| 2nd place, silver medalist(s) | China; Xie Hao; Wei Guoping; Liu Xinyang | 49.914 | |
Mixed team sprint : bronze final
| 3rd place, bronze medalist(s) | Spain; Amador Granados Alkorta; Eduardo Santas Asensio; Alfonso Cabello Llamas | 50.664 | |
| 4 | United States; Jennifer Schuble; Joseph Berenyi; Chris Murphy | 51.708 | |
