= Cycling at the 2020 Summer Paralympics – Men's individual pursuit C4 =

Men's individual pursuit C4 at the XVI Paralympic Games
- Venue: Izu Velodrome
- Dates: 27 August 2021
- Competitors: 7 from 6 nations

Medalists
1st place, gold medalist(s)		Jozef Metelka	Slovakia
2nd place, silver medalist(s)		Carol-Eduard Novak	Romania
3rd place, bronze medalist(s)		Diego Germán Dueñas	Colombia

The men's individual pursuit class C4 track cycling event at the 2020 Summer Paralympics took place on 27 August 2021 at the Izu Velodrome, Japan. This class is for cyclists who have impairments that affect their legs, arms, and/or trunk but are still capable to use a standard bicycle. 7 cyclists from 6 nations competed in this event.

== Competition format ==
The competition starts with a qualifying round where the 8 cyclists are divided into 4 heats, each heat containing 2 cyclists except for heat 1 which will only contain 1 cyclist; they will then compete on a time trial basis. The 2 fastest in the qualifying round would qualify to the gold medal final while the 3rd and 4th fastest will qualify to the bronze medal final. The distance of this event is 4000m. The event finals will be held on the same day as the qualifying round.

== Schedule ==
All times are Japan Standard Time (UTC+9)

Date	Time	Round
Thursday, 26 August	10:36	Qualifying
Thursday, 26 August	15:15	Finals

== Records ==
World Record	Jozef Metelka (SVK)	4:26.924	Montichiari, Italy	9 March 2016
Paralympic Record	Jozef Metelka (SVK)	4:29.112	Rio de Janeiro, Brazil	10 September 2016

== Results ==
=== Qualifying ===
Rank	Heat	Nation	Cyclists	Result	Notes
1	4	Slovakia	Jozef Metelka	4:22.772	QG, WR
2	3	Romania	Carol-Eduard Novak	4:31.212	QG
3	2	Colombia	Diego Germán Dueñas	4:35.230	QB
4	4	Ireland	Ronan Grimes	4:37.693	QB
5	3	RPC	Sergei Pudov	4:43.725	
6	2	Indonesia	Fadli Immammuddin	4:50.393	
7	1	Brazil	Andre Luiz Grizante	5:01.461	

=== Finals ===
Rank	Nation	Cyclists	Result	Notes
Gold medal final
1st place, gold medalist(s)	Slovakia	Jozef Metelka		
2nd place, silver medalist(s)	Romania	Carol-Eduard Novak	OVL	
Bronze medal final
3rd place, bronze medalist(s)	Colombia	Diego Germán Dueñas	4:35.607	
4	Ireland	Ronan Grimes	4:37.001	
