= Cycling at the 2020 Summer Paralympics – Men's road time trial C4 =

Men's road time trial C4 at the XVI Paralympic Games
- Venue: Fuji Speedway
- Dates: 31 August 2021
- Competitors: 9 from 8 nations
- Winning time: 45:47.10

Medalists
1st place, gold medalist(s)		Patrik Kuril	Slovakia
2nd place, silver medalist(s)		Jozef Metelka	Slovakia
3rd place, bronze medalist(s)		George Peasgood	Great Britain

The men's time trial class C4 road cycling event at the 2020 Summer Paralympics took place on 31 August 2021 at Fuji Speedway, Japan. 9 riders from 8 nations competed in this event.

The C4 classification is for cyclists with mild hemiplegic or diplegic spasticity; mild athetosis or ataxia; unilateral below knee or bilateral below elbow amputation, etcetera.

== Results ==
The event took place on 31 August 2021, at 14:07:

Rank	Rider	Nationality	Time	Deficit
1st place, gold medalist(s)	Patrik Kuril	Slovakia	45:47.10	
2nd place, silver medalist(s)	Jozef Metelka	Slovakia	46:05.05	+17.95
3rd place, bronze medalist(s)	George Peasgood	Great Britain	46:08.93	+21.83
4	Cody Jung	United States	47:09.44	+1:22.34
5	Sergei Pudov	RPC	47:33.31	+1:22.34
6	Ronan Grimes	Ireland	47:40.06	+1:52.96
7	Diego Germán Dueñas	Colombia	49:40.45	+3:53.35
8	Carol-Eduard Novak	Romania	50:16.60	+4:29.50
9	Andre Luiz Grizante	Brazil	50:16.60	+6:54.73
