= Guyana at the Paralympics =

- IPC code: GUY
- NPC: Guyana Paralympic Association
- Medals: Gold 0 Silver 0 Bronze 0 Total 0

Summer appearances
- 2020; 2024

Guyana made its Paralympic Games début at the 2020 Summer Paralympics in Tokyo, Japan, from 24 August to 5 September 2021. The country had a single representative in 2020, a male cyclist.

== Full results for Guyana at the Paralympics ==
Guyana sent one male cyclist for the 2020 Summer Paralympics after successfully getting a slot in the 2018 UCI Nations Ranking Allocation quota for the Americas.

| Athlete | Event | Time | Rank |
|---|---|---|---|
| Walter Grant-Stuart | Road race C5 | LAP | 18 |
| Walter Grant-Stuart | Time trial C5 | 1:04:17.69 | 13 |

== See also ==
- Guyana at the Olympics
- Guyana at the 2020 Summer Paralympics
