= Cycling at the 2016 Summer Paralympics – Men's individual pursuit C5 =

Men's individual pursuit C5 at the XV Paralympic Games
- Venue: Rio Olympic Velodrome
- Dates: 8 September
- Competitors: 11 from 9 nations

Medalists
1st place, gold medalist(s)		Yegor Dementyev	Ukraine
2nd place, silver medalist(s)		Alistair Donohoe	Australia
3rd place, bronze medalist(s)		Edwin Fabián Mátiz Ruiz	Colombia

The men's individual pursuit C5 took place on 8 September 2016.

The event began with a qualifying race over 4000m. Each of the athletes competed individually in a time trial basis. The fastest two riders raced for the gold medal and the third and fourth fastest riders raced for the bronze.

== Preliminaries ==
Q: Qualifier for Gold medal final
Qb: Qualifier for Bronze medal final
WR: World Record
PR: Paralympic Record

Men's individual Pursuit C5 - Preliminaries
Rank	Name	Nationality	Time	Avg. Speed	Notes
1	Yegor Dementyev	Ukraine	4:35.534	52.262	Q
2	Alistair Donohoe	Australia	4:38.050	51.789	Q
3	Edwin Fabián Mátiz Ruiz	Colombia	4:38.924	51.626	Qb
4	Lauro Cesar Chaman	Brazil	4:41.697	51.118	Qb
5	Xinyang Liu	China	4:43.304	50.828	
6	Tomas Kajnar	Czech Republic	4:45.707	50.401	
7	Christopher Murphy	United States	4:49.343	49.767	
8	Wolfgang Eibeck	Austria	4:49.644	49.716	
9	Soelito Gohr	Brazil	4:58.969	48.165	
10	Dane Wilson	South Africa	5:12.885	46.023	
11	José Frank Rodríguez	Dominican Republic	5:27.010	44.035	

== Finals ==
Men's individual Pursuit C5 - Medal Finals
Gold Final
Rank	Name	Nationality	Result	Avg Speed
1st place, gold medalist(s)	Yegor Dementyev	Ukraine	4:37.708	51.853
2nd place, silver medalist(s)	Alistair Donohoe	Australia	4:44.520	50.611
Bronze Final
Rank	Name	Nationality	Result	Avg Speed
3rd place, bronze medalist(s)	Edwin Fabián Mátiz Ruiz	Colombia	4:38.896	51.632
4	Lauro Cesar Chaman	Brazil	4:43.257	50.837
