= Dominican Republic at the Paralympics =

- Flag of the Dominican Republic
- IPC code: DOM
- NPC: Paralympic Committee of the Dominican Republic
- Medals: Gold 3 Silver 6 Bronze 1 Total 10

Summer appearances
- 1992; 1996; 2000; 2004; 2008; 2012; 2016; 2020; 2024

The Dominican Republic made its Paralympic Games début at the 1992 Summer Paralympics in Barcelona, with track and field athlete Rodolfo del Rosario as its sole representative. The country has competed in every subsequent edition of the Summer Paralympics, except 2000, but has never taken part in the Winter Paralympics. Dominican Republic delegations have never contained more than two competitors.

The country's best participation was at the 1992 Summer Paralympics in Barcelona and Madrid when Dominican athletes won 9 medals, 2 gold, 6 silver and one bronze. The third gold medal The third gold medal was won 4 years later when Robert Jiménez won and broke the world record in the 200m event in the class T12 in athletics.

This medal table also includes the 9 medals (2 gold, 6 silvers and 1 bronze) won at the 1992 Summer Paralympics for Intellectually Disabled, held in Madrid, who also organized by then International Coordenation Committee (ICC) and same Organizing Committee (COOB'92) who made the gestion of the 1992 Summer Paralympics held in Barcelona and also part of same event. But the results are not on the International Paralympic Committee 's (IPC) database.

== List of medallists ==
Medal	Name	Games	Sport	Event
Gold	Robert Jiménez	1996 Atlanta	Athletics	Men's 200 m T12
