= Cycling at the 2016 Summer Paralympics – Men's road time trial C4 =

Cycling, Men's road time trial C4 at the XV Paralympic Games
- Venue: Flamengo Park
- Dates: 14 September
- Competitors: 14 from 12 nations

Medalists
1st place, gold medalist(s)		Jozef Metelka	Slovakia
2nd place, silver medalist(s)		Kyle Bridgwood	Australia
3rd place, bronze medalist(s)		Patrik Kuril	Slovakia

The Men's time trial C4 road cycling event at the 2016 Summer Paralympics took place on 14 September at Flamengo Park, Pontal. Nine riders from eight nations competed.

The C4 category is for cyclists with upper or lower limb impairments and low-level neurological impairment.

== Results ==
Rank	Name	Nationality	Time
1st place, gold medalist(s)	Jozef Metelka	Slovakia	37:52.84
2nd place, silver medalist(s)	Kyle Bridgwood	Australia	38:23.21
3rd place, bronze medalist(s)	Patrik Kuril	Slovakia	39:07.55
4	Diego German Dueñas Gómez	Colombia	39:43.47
5	Jeffrey Scott Martin	United States	39:43.85
6	Carol-Eduard Novak	Romania	40:02.02
7	Thomas Schäfer	Germany	40:05.05
8	César Neira Pérez	Spain	40:18.26
9	Jiří Ježek	Czech Republic	40:31.84
10	Jiří Bouška	Czech Republic	40:45.12
11	Masashi Ishii	Japan	42:06.80
12	Damian Lopez Alfonso	Cuba	43:48.13
13	Leonel Solís	Costa Rica	44:35.46
14	Bahman Golbarnezhad	Iran	46:03.62
