= Dominican Republic at the 1996 Summer Paralympics =

- Flag of the Dominican Republic
- IPC code: DOM
- NPC: Paralympic Committee of the Dominican Republic

in Atlanta
- Competitors: 2
- Medals Ranked 50th: Gold 1 Silver 0 Bronze 0 Total 1

Summer Paralympics appearances (overview)
- 1992; 1996; 2000; 2004; 2008; 2012; 2016; 2020; 2024

Two male athletes from Dominican Republic competed at the 1996 Summer Paralympics in Atlanta, United States.

== Medalists ==
The following Dominican athlete won medal at the games.

Medal	Name	Sport	Event
Gold	Robert Jiménez	Athletics	Men's 200 m T12

== See also ==
- Dominican Republic at the Paralympics
- Dominican Republic at the 1996 Summer Olympics
