= Dominican Republic at the 2008 Summer Paralympics =

- Flag of the Dominican Republic
- IPC code: DOM
- NPC: Paralympic Committee of the Dominican Republic

in Beijing
- Competitors: 1 in 1 sport
- Medals: Gold 0 Silver 0 Bronze 0 Total 0

Summer Paralympics appearances (overview)
- 1992; 1996; 2000; 2004; 2008; 2012; 2016; 2020; 2024

Dominican Republic competed at the 2008 Summer Paralympics in Beijing, People's Republic of China. The country's delegation consisted of a single competitor, runner Alfonso Olivero Encarnacion. Olivero Encarnacion participated in one event and did not win a medal.

== Athletics ==
| Athlete | Event | Heat | | Semifinal | | Final | | Ref. |
| Athlete | Event | Result | Rank | Result | Rank | Result | Rank | Ref. |
|---|---|---|---|---|---|---|---|---|
| Alfonso Olivero Encarnacion | Men's 100 m T11 | 13.17 | 3 | Did not advance | | | | |

== See also ==
- Dominican Republic at the Paralympics
- Dominican Republic at the 2008 Summer Olympics
