= Dominican Republic at the 2004 Summer Paralympics =

- Flag of the Dominican Republic
- IPC code: DOM
- NPC: Paralympic Committee of the Dominican Republic

in Athens
- Competitors: 2 in 1 sport
- Flag bearer: Breylin Martinez
- Medals: Gold 0 Silver 0 Bronze 0 Total 0

Summer Paralympics appearances (overview)
- 1992; 1996; 2000; 2004; 2008; 2012; 2016; 2020; 2024

The Dominican Republic competed at the 2004 Summer Paralympics in Athens, Greece. The team included two athletes, one man and one woman, neither of whom won a medal.

== Sports ==
=== Athletics ===
==== Men's track ====
Athlete	Class	Event	Heats		Semifinal		Final	
Athlete	Class	Event	Result	Rank	Result	Rank	Result	Rank
Breylin Martinez	T12	200m	26.29	23	did not advance			
Breylin Martinez	T12	400m	59.35	12	did not advance			

==== Women's track ====
Athlete	Class	Event	Heats		Semifinal		Final	
Athlete	Class	Event	Result	Rank	Result	Rank	Result	Rank
Angela Dilone	T54	5000m	DNF		did not advance			

== See also ==
- Dominican Republic at the Paralympics
- Dominican Republic at the 2004 Summer Olympics
