= Dominican Republic at the 2012 Summer Paralympics =

- Flag of the Dominican Republic
- IPC code: DOM
- NPC: Paralympic Committee of the Dominican Republic

in London
- Competitors: 2 in 2 sports
- Medals: Gold 0 Silver 0 Bronze 0 Total 0

Summer Paralympics appearances (overview)
- 1992; 1996; 2000; 2004; 2008; 2012; 2016; 2020; 2024

Dominican Republic competed at the 2012 Summer Paralympics in London, United Kingdom from August 29 to September 9, 2012.

== Athletics ==
Men’s Field Events

Athlete	Event	Distance	Points	Rank
Alfonso Olivero Encarnacion	Shot Put F11-12	9.80	697	17
Alfonso Olivero Encarnacion	Discus Throw F11	27.08	—	9

== Cycling ==
=== Road ===
Men

Athlete	Event	Time	Rank
Rodny Minier	Road Race C4-5	DNF	
Rodny Minier	Time Trial C5	34:35.42	8

=== Track ===
Individual Pursuit

Athlete	Event	Heats		Final	
Athlete	Event	Time	Rank	Time	Rank
Rodny Minier	Men’s Individual Pursuit C5	4:55.352	10	did not advance	

== See also ==
- Dominican Republic at the 2012 Summer Olympics
