= Guyana at the 2020 Summer Paralympics =

- IPC code: GUY
- NPC: Guyana Paralympic Association

in Tokyo
- Competitors: 1 in 1 sport
- Flag bearer: Walter Grant-Stuart
- Medals: Gold 0 Silver 0 Bronze 0 Total 0

Summer Paralympics appearances (overview)
- 2020; 2024

Guyana competed at the 2020 Summer Paralympics in Tokyo, Japan, from 24 August to 5 September 2021. This was the country's debut appearance in the Paralympic Games.

== Cycling ==
Guyana sent one male cyclist after successfully getting a slot in the 2018 UCI Nations Ranking Allocation quota for the Americas.

Athlete	Event	Time	Rank
Walter Grant-Stuart	Road race C4-5	LAP	18
Walter Grant-Stuart	Time trial C5	1:04:17.69	13

== See also ==
- Guyana at the Paralympics
- Guyana at the 2020 Summer Olympics
