= Dominican Republic at the 1992 Summer Paralympics =

- Flag of the Dominican Republic
- IPC code: DOM
- NPC: Paralympic Committee of the Dominican Republic

in Barcelona
- Medals Ranked 37th: Gold 2 Silver 6 Bronze 1 Total 9

Summer Paralympics appearances (overview)
- 1992; 1996; 2000; 2004; 2008; 2012; 2016; 2020; 2024

Dominican Republic competed at the 1992 Summer Paralympics in Barcelona, Spain. 1 competitor from Dominican Republic won no medals and so did not place in the medal table.

However, the country earned 2 gold, 6 silver and 1 bronze medal at the Paralympic Games held in Madrid. And these medals were added to the Barcelona final medal table added to the total won in Barcelona.

== See also ==
- Dominican Republic at the Paralympics
- Dominican Republic at the 1992 Summer Olympics
