= Dominican Republic at the 2020 Summer Paralympics =

- Flag of the Dominican Republic
- IPC code: DOM
- NPC: Paralympic Committee of the Dominican Republic

in Tokyo
- Competitors: 5 in 3 sports
- Flag bearers: Lourdes Aybar & Patricio López
- Medals: Gold 0 Silver 0 Bronze 0 Total 0

Summer Paralympics appearances (overview)
- 1992; 1996; 2000; 2004; 2008; 2012; 2016; 2020; 2024

Dominican Republic competed at the 2020 Summer Paralympics in Tokyo, Japan, from 24 August to 5 September 2021.

== Disability classifications ==
Every participant at the Paralympics has their disability grouped into one of five disability categories; amputation, the condition may be congenital or sustained through injury or illness; cerebral palsy; wheelchair athletes, there is often overlap between this and other categories; visual impairment, including blindness; Les autres, any physical disability that does not fall strictly under one of the other categories, for example dwarfism or multiple sclerosis. Each Paralympic sport then has its own classifications, dependent upon the specific physical demands of competition. Events are given a code, made of numbers and letters, describing the type of event and classification of the athletes competing. Some sports, such as athletics, divide athletes by both the category and severity of their disabilities, other sports, for example swimming, group competitors from different categories together, the only separation being based on the severity of the disability.

== Competitors ==
Sport	Men	Women	Total
Athletics	1	1	2
Powerlifting	1	0	1
Swimming	1	1	2
Total	2	3	5

== Athletics ==
=== Women ===
Track

Athlete	Event	Heat		Semifinal		Final	
Athlete	Event	Result	Rank	Result	Rank	Result	Rank
Darlenys de la Cruz Guide: Erick García	100m T12	12.55 PB	1 Q	12.45 PB	2q	12.53	4
Darlenys de la Cruz Guide: Erick García	200m T12	25.79	2	N/A		DNA	5
Luis Andres Vasquez	400m T47	50.94	3 Q	N/A		49.61 PB	5

== Powerlifting ==
Athlete	Event	Result	Rank
Men
Jose Manuel	Men's 65 kg	145	7

== Swimming ==
Men

Athlete	Event	Heats		Final	
Athlete	Event	Result	Rank	Result	Rank
Patricio Tse Anibal	Men's 50 metre breaststroke SB2	1:41.18	4	1:41.29	8

Women

Athlete	Event	Heats		Final	
Athlete	Event	Result	Rank	Result	Rank
Lourdes Alejandra	Women's 100m backstroke SB6	1:53.25	6	Did not advance	11
Lourdes Alejandra	Women's 50 metre freestyle S8	36.82	7	Did not advance	13
Lourdes Alejandra	Women's 100m butterfly S8	N/A		1:44.12	8

== See also ==
- Dominican Republic at the 2016 Summer Olympics
