= Martin van de Pol (cyclist) =

Dutch para-cyclist

Personal information
- Nationality: Dutch
- Born: 1 March 1991 (age 35)
- Home town: Barneveld, Netherlands

Sport
- Sport: Para-cycling
- Disability class: C5
Medal record
Representing Netherlands
Men's para-cycling
Paralympic Games
Bronze medal – third place	2024 Paris	Road race C4–5
Road World Championships
Silver medal – second place	2019 Emmen	Road race C5
Track World Championships
Silver medal – second place	2023 Glasgow	Individual pursuit C5
Silver medal – second place	2025 Rio de Janeiro	Scratch race C5

Martin van de Pol (born 3 March 1991) is a Dutch Para-cyclist. He represented the Netherlands at the 2024 Summer Paralympics.

== Career ==
Pol represented the Netherlands in the road race C4–5 event at the 2024 Summer Paralympics and won a bronze medal.
