= George Peasgood =

British paratriathlete (born 1995)

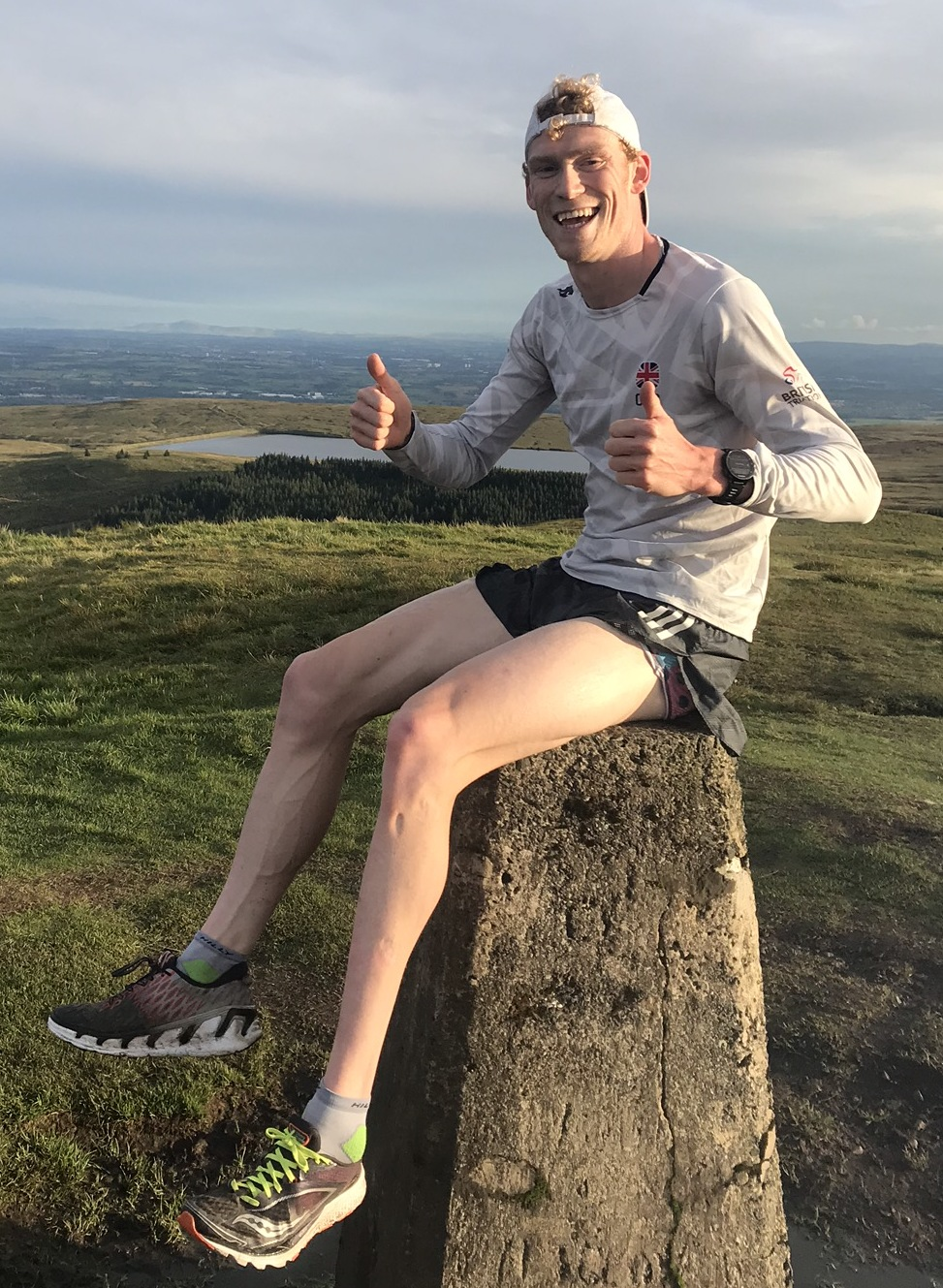

Personal information
- Nationality: British
- Born: 2 October 1995 (age 30) Saffron Walden, England

Sport
- Sport: Paratriathlon, Para-cycling
- Disability class: PTS5, C4
Medal record
Representing Great Britain
Men's paratriathlon
Paralympic Games
Silver medal – second place	2020 Tokyo	PTS5
World Championships
Bronze medal – third place	2013 London	TRI 5
Bronze medal – third place	2018 Gold Coast	PTS5
European Championships
Silver medal – second place	2021 Valencia	PTS5
Bronze medal – third place	2017 Kitzbühel	PTS5
Bronze medal – third place	2022 Olsztyn	PTS5
Men's para-cycling
Paralympic Games
Bronze medal – third place	2020 Tokyo	Road time trial C4

George Peasgood (born 2 October 1995) is a British paratriathlete who competes in the PTS5 classification. He represented Great Britain at the 2016 Paralympic Games in Rio, where he finished seventh. Peasgood has won the GBR Paratriathlon National Championships four times- 2015, 2016, 2017, 2019. George Peasgood is based in Loughborough, England where he trains at the Loughborough Performance Centre. He was born in Saffron Walden, Essex.

== Career ==
Peasgood first started triathlon in 2009 following a leg lengthening operation. In 2011, he was classified as a Paratriathlete at a British Triathlon Talent ID day. Peasgood won his first major medal in 2013 winning bronze at the ITU World Triathlon Grand Final London and silver at the GBR Paratriathlon National Championships. The classification structure was changed in 2014, making Peasgood's classification much more challenging but he still finished in the top ten in all five of the events he competed in. The 2015 season saw him win his first major event gold medal at the GBR Paratriathlon National Championships and win silver medals at the Buffalo City ITU World Paratriathlon Event, London ITU World Paratriathlon Event and Detroit ITU World Paratriathlon Event.

Peasgood made his Paralympic debut in triathlon as the youngest member of the paratriathlon team at the 2016 Summer Paralympics in Rio de Janeiro, finishing seventh in the men's PT4 event. He also won a gold medal that year in the 2016 Penrith ITU World Paratriathlon Event. The 2017 season saw Peasgood win a gold medal at the GBR Paratriathlon National Championships and two silver medals at the Iseo - Franciacorta ITU Paratriathlon World Cup and Edmonton ITU World Paratriathlon Series. He also won two bronze medals at the 2017 Yokohama ITU World Paratriathlon Series and Kitzbühel ETU Triathlon European Championships.

Peasgood consistently made the podium throughout 2018, taking gold at the Yokohama ITU World Paratriathlon Series, Iseo - Franciacorta ITU World Paratriathlon Series and Lausanne ITU Paratriathlon World Cup. He also won a silver medal at the 2018 Eton Dorney ITU Paratriathlon World Cup and a bronze medal at the ITU World Triathlon Grand Final Gold Coast. Peasgood also represented Great Britain in paracycling in 2018 and won a UCI Time Trial World Cup Silver. This success continued into 2019, as Peasgood was victorious in the PTS5 race at the Great Britain Paratriathlon National Championships. He also took home a silver medal at the Milan ITU World Paratriathlon Series and bronze at both the Groupe Copley World Paratriathlon Series Montreal and the Tokyo ITU Paratriathlon World Cup.

== Personal life ==
Peasgood suffered a traumatic injury to his left leg when he was two years old, which led to him undergoing several reconstructive surgeries during his childhood. Coming from a family of high-achieving triathletes, his brother Jack Peasgood is not only married to paratriathlete Alison Peasgood, but has also represented the Great Britain Age Group team in both triathlon and duathlon. Additionally, Peasgood's mother has completed ten consecutive London Marathons and his father got into triathlon following a running injury. Both of his parents have completed Ironman triathlons.

Following a cycling accident during training on 1 October 2022, Peasgood suffered a diffuse axonal injury and remained in hospital for several months. He was given a 10 per cent change of emerging from his coma, but revived and left hospital in 2023 and returned to the Great Britain paratriathlon squad later in the same year, potentially at a new classification to take account of his injuries although he does not intend to attempt to qualify for the 2024 Summer Paralympics.

== Paratriathlon competitions ==
The following list of results. Unless indicated otherwise, the competitions are paratriathlons.

Date	Competition	Rank
2019-09-14	Valencia ETU Paratriathlon European Championships	5
2019-09-01	ITU World Triathlon Grand Final Lausanne	10
2019-08-17	Tokyo ITU Paratriathlon World Cup	3
2019-06-28	Groupe Copley World Paratriathlon Series Montreal	3
2019-05-27	GBR Paratriathlon National Championships	1
2019-04-27	Milan ITU World Paratriathlon Series	2
2018-09-15	ITU World Triathlon Grand Final Gold Coast	3
2018-08-18	Lausanne ITU Paratriathlon World Cup	1
2018-06-30	Iseo-Franciacorta ITU World Paratriathlon Series	1
2018-05-28	Eton Dorney ITU Paratriathlon World Cup	2
2018-05-12	Yokohama ITU World Paratriathlon Series	1
2017-09-15	ITU World Triathlon Grand Final Rotterdam	4
2017-08-28	GBR Paratriathlon National Championships	1
2017-07-28	Edmonton ITU World Paratriathlon Series	2
2017-07-08	Iseo-Franciacorta ITU World Paratriathlon Series	2
2017-06-16	Kitzbuhel ETU Triathlon European Championships	3
2017-05-13	Yokohama ITU World Paratriathlon Series	3

DNF = Did not finish

DNS = Did not start

DSQ = Disqualified
