= Cycling at the 2016 Summer Paralympics – Men's individual pursuit C4 =

Men's individual pursuit C4 at the XV Paralympic Games
- Venue: Rio Olympic Velodrome
- Dates: 8 September
- Competitors: 10 from 9 nations

Medalists
1st place, gold medalist(s)		Jozef Metelka	Slovakia
2nd place, silver medalist(s)		Kyle Bridgwood	Australia
3rd place, bronze medalist(s)		Diego Germán Dueñas	Colombia

The men's individual pursuit C4 took place on 8 September 2016.

The event began with a qualifying race over 4000 m. Each of the athletes competed individually in a time-trial basis. The fastest two riders raced for the gold medal and the third- and fourth-fastest riders raced for the bronze.

== Preliminaries ==
Q: Qualifier for Gold medal final
Qb: Qualifier for Bronze medal final
WR: World Record
PR: Paralympic Record

Men's individual Pursuit C4 - Preliminaries
Rank	Name	Nationality	Time	Avg. Speed	Notes
1	Jozef Metelka	Slovakia	4:29.112	53.509	Q PR
2	Kyle Bridgwood	Australia	4:38.639	51.679	Q
3	Diego German Duenas	Colombia	4:44.380	50.636	Qb
4	Scott Martin	United States	4:48.063	49.989	Qb
5	Carol-Eduard Novak	Romania	4:51.037	49.478	
6	Jiri Jezek	Czech Republic	4:55.033	48.808	
7	Jiri Bouska	Czech Republic	4:58.340	48.267	
8	Masashi Ishii	Japan	4:59.224	48.124	
9	Cesar Neira Perez	Spain	5:01.045	47.833	
10	Byron Raubenheimer	New Zealand	5:08.570	46.666	

== Finals ==
Men's individual Pursuit C4 - Medal Finals
Gold Final
Rank	Name	Nationality	Result	Avg Speed
1st place, gold medalist(s)	Jozef Metelka	Slovakia	OVL	-
2nd place, silver medalist(s)	Kyle Bridgwood	Australia	caught	-
Bronze Final
Rank	Name	Nationality	Result	Avg Speed
3rd place, bronze medalist(s)	Diego German Duenas	Colombia	4:45.310	50.471
4	Scott Martin	United States	4:47.549	50.078
