= Archie Atkinson (cyclist) =

British paralympic cyclist

- Archie Atkinson (2026)

Personal information
- Born: 18 June 2004 (age 22)

Sport
- Country: Great Britain
- Sport: Para-cycling
- Disability class: C4
Medal record
Para-cycling
Representing Great Britain
Paralympic Games
Silver medal – second place	2024 Paris	Individual pursuit C4
Road World Championships
Bronze medal – third place	2023 Glasgow	Road race C4
Bronze medal – third place	2025 Ronse	Road race C4
Track World Championships
Gold medal – first place	2023 Glasgow	Scratch race C4
Gold medal – first place	2024 Rio de Janeiro	Individual pursuit C4
Gold medal – first place	2025 Rio de Janeiro	Scratch race C4
Silver medal – second place	2025 Rio de Janeiro	1 km time trial C4
Silver medal – second place	2025 Rio de Janeiro	Elimination C4
Silver medal – second place	2026 Apeldoorn	Scratch race C4
Silver medal – second place	2026 Apeldoorn	Elimination C4
Bronze medal – third place	2026 Apeldoorn	Sprint C4

Archie Atkinson (born 18 June 2004) is a British paralympic cyclist. He competed at the 2024 Summer Paralympics, winning the silver medal in the men's pursuit C4 event.

== Early life ==
Atkinson grew up in Heaton Moor in Greater Manchester. He began cycling as a result of his father working at Evans Cycles, and also took part in para-football as a child. He attended Aquinas College.

== Career ==
Atkinson won a gold medal in the Scratch Race C4 in the 2023 UCI Para-cycling Track World Championships, beating Benjamin Westenberg of New Zealand. He dedicated his win to fellow track cyclist Magnus White, who had died in a training accident the previous month.

In March 2024, Atkinson won a gold medal at the 2024 UCI Para-cycling Track World Championships in the individual pursuit.

Atkinson participated in the 2024 Summer Paralympics. He set a world record in the qualifying round of the men's pursuit C4, advancing through to face Jozef Metelka in the final. In the race, he gained an advantage of six seconds over Metelka, however crashed on the penultimate lap, leading to him taking the silver medal. He also took part in the men's road race C4–5, however did not finish the race.

== Personal life ==
Atkinson has cerebral palsy, ADHD and is autistic. He experienced bullying growing up as a result of his conditions.
