= Arnoud Nijhuis =

Dutch Paralympic cyclist

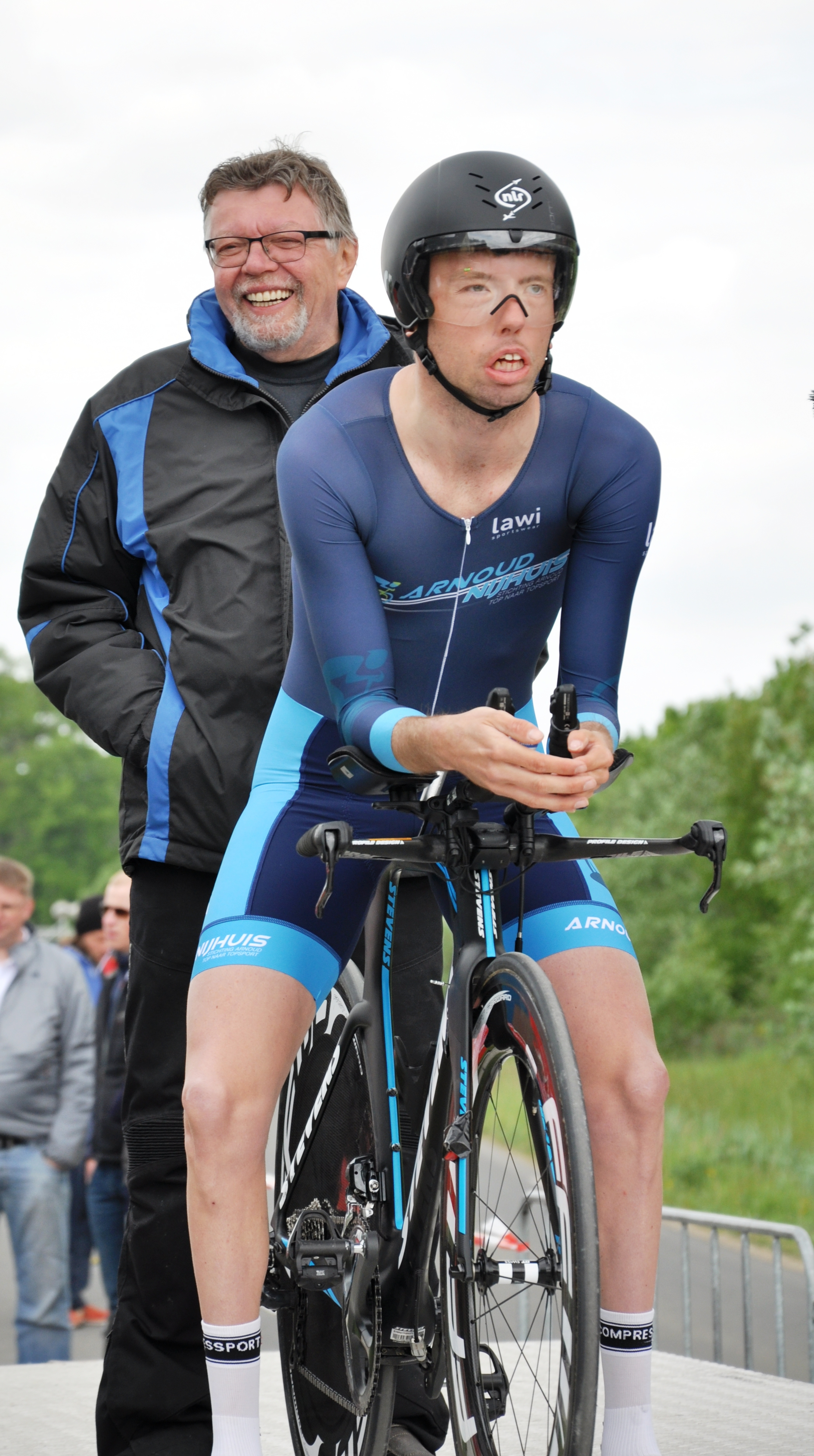

Personal information
- Born: 9 July 1989 (age 36)

Sport
- Country: Netherlands
Medal record
Paralympic Games
Silver medal – second place	2016 Rio de Janeiro	1 km time trial C1–3
Bronze medal – third place	2016 Rio de Janeiro	Individual pursuit C1

Arnoud Nijhuis (born 9 July 1989) is a Dutch Paralympic cyclist. He represented the Netherlands at the 2016 Summer Paralympics held in Rio de Janeiro, Brazil and he won two medals: the silver medal in the men's 1 km time trial C1–3 event and the bronze medal in the men's individual pursuit C1 event.

At the 2016 UCI Para-cycling Track World Championships held in Montichiari, Italy, he won the gold medal in the 1 km time trial C1 event and the bronze medal in the 3 km pursuit C1 event.

At the 2018 UCI Para-cycling Track World Championships held in Rio de Janeiro, Brazil, he won the silver medal in the men's time trial C1 event.
