= Eduardo Santas =

Spanish cyclist (born 1989)

Personal information
- Born: 4 August 1989 (age 37) Zaragoza, Aragon, Spain

Cycling career
- Sport: Cycling
- Disciplines: Road track
- Role: Rider
Medal record
Men's para cycling
Representing Spain
Paralympic Games
Silver medal – second place	2024 Paris	Time trial C3
Bronze medal – third place	2016 Rio de Janeiro	Mixed team sprint C1–5
Track World Championships
Bronze medal – third place	2025 Rio de Janeiro	Elimination C3
Bronze medal – third place	2025 Rio de Janeiro	Scratch race C3
Bronze medal – third place	2025 Rio de Janeiro	Mixed team sprint C1–5
Bronze medal – third place	2026 Apeldoorn	Mixed team sprint C1–5

Eduardo Santas Asensio (born 4 August 1989) is a Spanish cyclist who competes in para-cycling in the track and road events. He a member of the ADOP plan and the Spanish national para-cycling team.

== Career ==
In 2016, Santas participated in the 2016 Paralympic Games where he won the bronze medal in the mixed team sprint event, together with Alfonso Cabello and Amador Granados, with the three also being the first Spaniards to medal in this event at the Paralympic Games. He also obtained two diplomas in the individual pursuit and kilometre events on the track. He won sixteen medals at the World Track Championships between 2014 and 2022, and four medals at the World Road Championships in 2015 and 2022.

In 2017, Santas was the first Spanish adapted cyclist to participate in a national track championship for the absolute category. The event was held at the Palma Arena velodrome and he participated in the pursuit and kilometre events.
