= Dominican Republic at the 2016 Summer Paralympics =

- Flag of the Dominican Republic
- IPC code: DOM
- NPC: Paralympic Committee of the Dominican Republic

in Rio de Janeiro
- Competitors: 2 in 2 sports
- Medals: Gold 0 Silver 0 Bronze 0 Total 0

Summer Paralympics appearances (overview)
- 1992; 1996; 2000; 2004; 2008; 2012; 2016; 2020; 2024

Dominican Republic competed at the 2016 Summer Paralympics in Rio de Janeiro, Brazil, from 7 to 18 September 2016.

== Disability classifications ==
Every participant at the Paralympics has their disability grouped into one of five disability categories; amputation, the condition may be congenital or sustained through injury or illness; cerebral palsy; wheelchair athletes, there is often overlap between this and other categories; visual impairment, including blindness; Les autres, any physical disability that does not fall strictly under one of the other categories, for example dwarfism or multiple sclerosis. Each Paralympic sport then has its own classifications, dependent upon the specific physical demands of competition. Events are given a code, made of numbers and letters, describing the type of event and classification of the athletes competing. Some sports, such as athletics, divide athletes by both the category and severity of their disabilities, other sports, for example swimming, group competitors from different categories together, the only separation being based on the severity of the disability.

== Athletics ==
Men's Track

Athlete	Events	Heat		Semifinal		Final	
Athlete	Events	Time	Rank	Time	Rank	Time	Rank
Joselito Hernandez (Guide – Bizmark Volquez Diaz)	100 m T11	11.73	2	did not advance			
Joselito Hernandez (Guide – Bizmark Volquez Diaz)	200 m T11	24.38	3	did not advance			

== Cycling ==
With one pathway for qualification being one highest ranked NPCs on the UCI Para-Cycling male and female Nations Ranking Lists on 31 December 2014, the Dominican Republic qualified for the 2016 Summer Paralympics in Rio, assuming they continued to meet all other eligibility requirements.

=== Road ===
Athlete	Event	Time	Rank
José Frank Rodríguez	Men's road time trial C5	42:44.57	13
José Frank Rodríguez	Men's road race C4-5	2:27:07	16

=== Track ===
Pursuits and time trials

Athlete	Event	Qualification		Final	
Athlete	Event	Time	Rank	Opposition Time	Rank
José Frank Rodríguez	Men's 1000m time trial C4-5	—N/a		1:14.427	19
José Frank Rodríguez	Men's individual pursuit C5	5:27.010	11	did not advance	

== See also ==
- Dominican Republic at the 2016 Summer Olympics
