= Slovakia at the 2016 Summer Paralympics =

- IPC code: SVK
- NPC: Slovak Paralympic Committee
- Website: www.spv.sk

in Rio de Janeiro
- Competitors: 29 in 10 sports
- Flag bearer: Ján Riapoš
- Medals Ranked 25th: Gold 5 Silver 3 Bronze 3 Total 11

Summer Paralympics appearances (overview)
- 1996; 2000; 2004; 2008; 2012; 2016; 2020; 2024

Other related appearances
- Czechoslovakia (1972–1992)

Slovakia competed at the 2016 Summer Paralympics in Rio de Janeiro, Brazil, from 7 to 18 September 2016.

== Medalists ==
Medal	Name	Sport	Event	Date
Gold	Veronika Vadovičová	Shooting	Women's 10 metre air rifle standing SH1	8 September
Gold	Veronika Vadovičová	Shooting	Mixed 10m air rifle prone SH1	10 September
Gold	Jozef Metelka	Cycling	Men's individual pursuit C4	10 September
Gold	Samuel Andrejčík; Róbert Ďurkovič; Michaela Balcová	Boccia	Mixed Pairs BC4	12 September
Gold	Jozef Metelka	Cycling	Men's road time trial C4	14 September
Silver	Jozef Metelka	Cycling	Men's 1 km time trial C4–5	9 September
Silver	Veronika Vadovičová	Shooting	Women's 50m rifle 3 positions SH1	13 September
Silver	Samuel Andrejčík	Boccia	Individual BC4	16 September
Bronze	Patrik Kuril	Cycling	Men's road time trial C4	14 September
Bronze	Marián Kuřeja	Athletics	Men's club throw – F51	16 September
Bronze	Peter Kinik	Archery	Men's individual compound W1	16 September

Medals by sport
Sport	1	2	3	Total
Cycling	2	1	1	4
Shooting	2	1	0	3
Boccia	1	1	0	2
Archery	0	0	1	1
Athletics	0	0	1	1
Total	5	3	3	11

== Disability classifications ==
Every participant at the Paralympics has their disability grouped into one of five disability categories; amputation, the condition may be congenital or sustained through injury or illness; cerebral palsy; wheelchair athletes, there is often overlap between this and other categories; visual impairment, including blindness; Les autres, any physical disability that does not fall strictly under one of the other categories, for example dwarfism or multiple sclerosis. Each Paralympic sport then has its own classifications, dependent upon the specific physical demands of competition. Events are given a code, made of numbers and letters, describing the type of event and classification of the athletes competing. Some sports, such as athletics, divide athletes by both the category and severity of their disabilities, other sports, for example swimming, group competitors from different categories together, the only separation being based on the severity of the disability.

== Archery ==
Slovakia qualified one archer for the Rio Games following their performance at the 2015 World Archery Para Championships. Marcel Pavlik entered the competition seeded third, and only needed one match to book his place in Rio. He did this by defeating China's Chen Boping. He ended 5th in his Men's individual compound open event. Peter Kinik has also qualified for the Men's individual compound W1 event where he won the bronze medal on 16 September 2016

Athlete	Event	Ranking round		Round of 32	Round of 16	Quarterfinals	Semifinals	Final	
Athlete	Event	Points	Seed	Opposition Result	Opposition Result	Opposition Result	Opposition Result	Opposition Result	Rank
Peter Kinik	Men's individual compound W1	638	3	N/A	Manuel Sanchez Camus (ESP); W 120-113	Koo Dong Sub (KOR); W 127-125	David Drahonínský (CZE); L 125-128	Uwe Herter (GER); W 133-125	Bronze medal
Marcel Pavlík	Men's individual compound open	681	6	Éric Pereira (FRA); W 141-136	Gianpaolo Cancelli (ITA); W 140-134	Ai Xinliang (CHN); L 138-142	Did not advance		

== Track and field (athletics) ==
The Slovak track and field team consisted of 2 men. Adrián Matušík ended up 6th in his Discus throw F44 competition. Marián Kureja competed in the Men's club throw – F51 competition where he won the bronze medal on 16 September 2016

Men

Athlete	Event	Heat		Semifinal		Final	
Athlete	Event	Result	Rank	Result	Rank	Result	Rank
Marián Kuřeja	Men's club throw – F51	N/A				26.82	Bronze medal
Adrián Matušík	Discus throw F44	N/A				53.20	6

== Boccia ==
Slovakia qualified for the 2016 Summer Paralympics in this sport at the Guilford hosted 2015 Boccia European Team And Pairs Championships, London in the BC4 Pair event. They claimed gold ahead of silver medalist Great Britain and bronze medalists Hungary. They won 4 - 3 against Great Britain in the gold medal match, after having lost 2 - 5 to in group play.

== Cycling ==
With one pathway for qualification being one highest ranked NPCs on the UCI Para-Cycling male and female Nations Ranking Lists on 31 December 2014, Slovakia qualified for the 2016 Summer Paralympics in Rio, assuming they continued to meet all other eligibility requirements.

== Equestrian ==
Katarina Jobbagyova was given a Bipartite Commission Invitation slot to compete in Rio.

== Shooting ==
The first opportunity to qualify for shooting at the Rio Games took place at the 2014 IPC Shooting World Championships in Suhl. Shooters earned spots for their NPC. Slovakia earned a qualifying spot at this event in the R2 – 10m Air Rifle standing women SH1 event as a result of Veronika Vadovicova winning a gold medal.

The last direct qualifying event for Rio in shooting took place at the 2015 IPC Shooting World Cup in Fort Benning in November. Radoslav Malenovsky earned a qualifying spot for their country at this competition in the R3 Mixed 10m Air Rifle Prone SH1 event.

== See also ==
- Slovakia at the 2016 Summer Olympics
