= Cycling at the 2016 Summer Paralympics – Men's 1 km time trial C4–5 =

Cycling, Men's 1 km Time Trial C4–5 at the XV Paralympic Games
- Venue: Rio Olympic Velodrome
- Dates: 9 September
- Competitors: 20 from 14 nations

Medalists
1st place, gold medalist(s)		Jody Cundy	Great Britain
2nd place, silver medalist(s)		Jozef Metelka	Slovakia
3rd place, bronze medalist(s)		Alfonso Cabello	Spain

The men's 1 km time trial C4–5 track cycling event at the 2016 Summer Paralympics took place on 9 September. Twenty riders competed.

== Results ==
Rank	Athlete	Nation	Sport class	Real time	Factor	Factored time
1st place, gold medalist(s)	Jody Cundy	Great Britain	C4	1:04.492 PR	96.87	1:02.473
2nd place, silver medalist(s)	Jozef Metelka	Slovakia	C4	1:06.269	96.87	1:04.194
3rd place, bronze medalist(s)	Alfonso Cabello	Spain	C5	1:04.494 PR	100	1:04.494
4	Jon-Allan Butterworth	Great Britain	C5	1:04.733	100	1:04.733
5	Edwin Matiz Ruiz	Colombia	C5	1:06.248	100	1:06.248
6	Masashi Ishii	Japan	C4	1:09.616	96.87	1:07.437
7	Wei Guoping	China	C4	1:09.755	96.87	1:07.571
8	Christopher Murphy	United States	C5	1:08.119	100	1:08.119
9	Jiří Bouška	Czech Republic	C4	1:10.395	96.87	1:08.191
10	Yegor Dementyev	Ukraine	C5	1:08.555	100	1:08.555
11	Byron Raubenheimer	New Zealand	C4	1:11.043	96.87	1:08.819
12	Lauro Chaman	Brazil	C5	1:09.423	100	1:09.423
13	Tomáš Kajnar	Czech Republic	C5	1:09.741	100	1:09.741
14	Diego Duenas Gomez	Colombia	C4	1:12.296	96.87	1:10.033
15	Scott Martin	United States	C4	1:12.522	96.87	1:10.252
16	Jiří Ježek	Czech Republic	C4	1:13.138	96.87	1:10.848
17	Dane Wilson	South Africa	C5	1:10.957	100	1:10.957
18	Soelito Gohr	Brazil	C5	1:13.425	100	1:13.425
19	Jose Rodriguez	Dominican Republic	C5	1:14.427	100	1:14.427
20	Damian Lopez Alfonso	Cuba	C4	1:16.973	96.87	1:14.563
