= Dominican Republic at the 2024 Summer Paralympics =

- Flag of the Dominican Republic
- IPC code: DOM
- NPC: Paralympic Committee of the Dominican Republic

in Paris, France August 28, 2024 – September 8, 2024
- Competitors: 11 in 5 sports
- Flag bearers: Darlenys de la Cruz Severino; Jesus Manuel Rodriguez Vallejo
- Medals: Gold 0 Silver 0 Bronze 0 Total 0

Summer Paralympics appearances (overview)
- 1992; 1996; 2000; 2004; 2008; 2012; 2016; 2020; 2024

The Dominican Republic competed at the 2024 Summer Paralympics in Paris, France, from 28 August to 8 September.

== Competitors ==
The following is the list of number of competitors in the Games.

Sport	Men	Women	Total
Athletics	3	1	4
Cycling	1	0	1
Powerlifting	1	0	1
Swimming	1	1	2
Taekwondo	2	1	3
Total	8	3	11

== Athletics ==
Track and field athletes from Dominican Republic has achieved quota places for the following events based on their results at the 2023 World Championships, 2024 World Championships, or through high performance allocation, as long as they meet the minimum entry standard (MES).

Key

- Note–Ranks given for track events are within the athlete's heat only
- Q = Qualified for the next round
- q = Qualified for the next round as a fastest loser or, in field events, by position without achieving the qualifying target
- DQ = Disqualified
- PR = Paralympic Record
- AR = Area (or continental) Record
- NR = National Record
- SB = Season's Best
- N/A = Round not applicable for the event
- Bye = Athlete not required to compete in round

Track & road events

Athlete	Event	Heat		Semifinal		Final	
Athlete	Event	Result	Rank	Result	Rank	Result	Rank
Luis Andres Vasquez Segura	Men's 100 m T47	11.09	7	Did not advance			
Luis Andres Vasquez Segura	Men's 400 m T47	49.55	5 q	—N/a		49.07	6
Darlenys de la Cruz Severino	Women's 100 m T12	12.37	1 Q	12.40	3	Did not advance	
Darlenys de la Cruz Severino	Women's 200 m T12	25.80	2 q	25.58	3	Did not advance	
Diana Carolina Vivenes Paula	Women's 400 m T20	59.23	6	Did not advance			

Field events

Athlete	Event	Final	
Athlete	Event	Result	Rank
Wagner Astacio	Men's long jump T63	3.90	7
Wagner Astacio	Men's high jump T63	1.85	5
Diana Carolina Vivenes Paula	Women's long jump T20	4.72	14

== Cycling ==
For the first time since 2016, Dominican Republic sent one male para-cyclist after finished the top eligible nation's at the 2022 UCI Nation's ranking allocation ranking.

=== Road ===
Athlete	Event	Time	Rank
Jose Frank Rodriguez Hernandez	Men's road race C4-5	2:32:24	11
Jose Frank Rodriguez Hernandez	Men's time trial C4	43:23.39	11

=== Track ===
Athlete	Event	Qualification		Final	
Athlete	Event	Time	Rank	Time	Rank
Jose Frank Rodriguez Hernandez	Men's pursuit C4	5:17.462	12	Did not advance	

== Powerlifting ==
Athlete	Event	Attempts (kg)				Result (kg)	Rank
Athlete	Event	1	2	3	4	Result (kg)	Rank
Jesus Manuel Rodriguez Vallejo	Men's 80 kg	190	~~197~~	~~197~~	—N/a	190	8

== Swimming ==
Athlete	Event	Heats		Final	
Athlete	Event	Result	Rank	Result	Rank
Marcos Miguel Jimenez Sencion	Men's 50 m freestyle S5	38.28	13	Did not advance	
Marcos Miguel Jimenez Sencion	Men's 50 m backstroke S5	42.21	12	Did not advance	
Marcos Miguel Jimenez Sencion	Men's 100 m breaststroke SB4	2:06.03	10	Did not advance	
Alejandra Aybar	Women's 50 m butterfly S7	41.47	15	Did not advance	
Alejandra Aybar	Women's 200 m individual medley SM7	3:26.93	11	Did not advance	
Alejandra Aybar	Women's 100 m breaststroke SB6	—N/a		1:52.70	8

== Taekwondo ==
Dominican Republic entered three athletes to compete at the Paralympics competition. Geraldo Castro Encarnacion (men's under 63 kg), Julio Figuereo (men's above 80 kg) and Elisabeth Geraldo (women's under 52 kg) qualified for the games, in their respective classes, following the home crowd triumph of their gold medal results, at the 2024 Pan American Qualification Tournament in Santo Domingo, marking the nation's debut at these sports.

Athlete	Event	Round of 16	Quarterfinals	Semifinals	Repechage 1	Repechage 2	Final / BM	
Athlete	Event	Opposition Result	Opposition Result	Opposition Result	Opposition Result	Opposition Result	Opposition Result	Rank
Geraldo Castro Encarnacion	Men's −63 kg	Al-Turayk (KSA); W 23–9	Ganbat (MGL); L 5–19	—N/a		Adouich (MAR); L 13–19	Did not advance	7
Julio Figuereo	Men's +80 kg	Liu (CHN); L 12–17	Did not advance					
Elisabeth Geraldo	Women's −52 kg	Krassavtseva (KAZ); L 8–10	Did not advance					

== See also ==
- Dominican Republic at the 2023 Parapan American Games
- Dominican Republic at the 2024 Summer Olympics
- Dominican Republic at the Paralympics
