= Kévin Le Cunff =

French cyclist (born 1988)

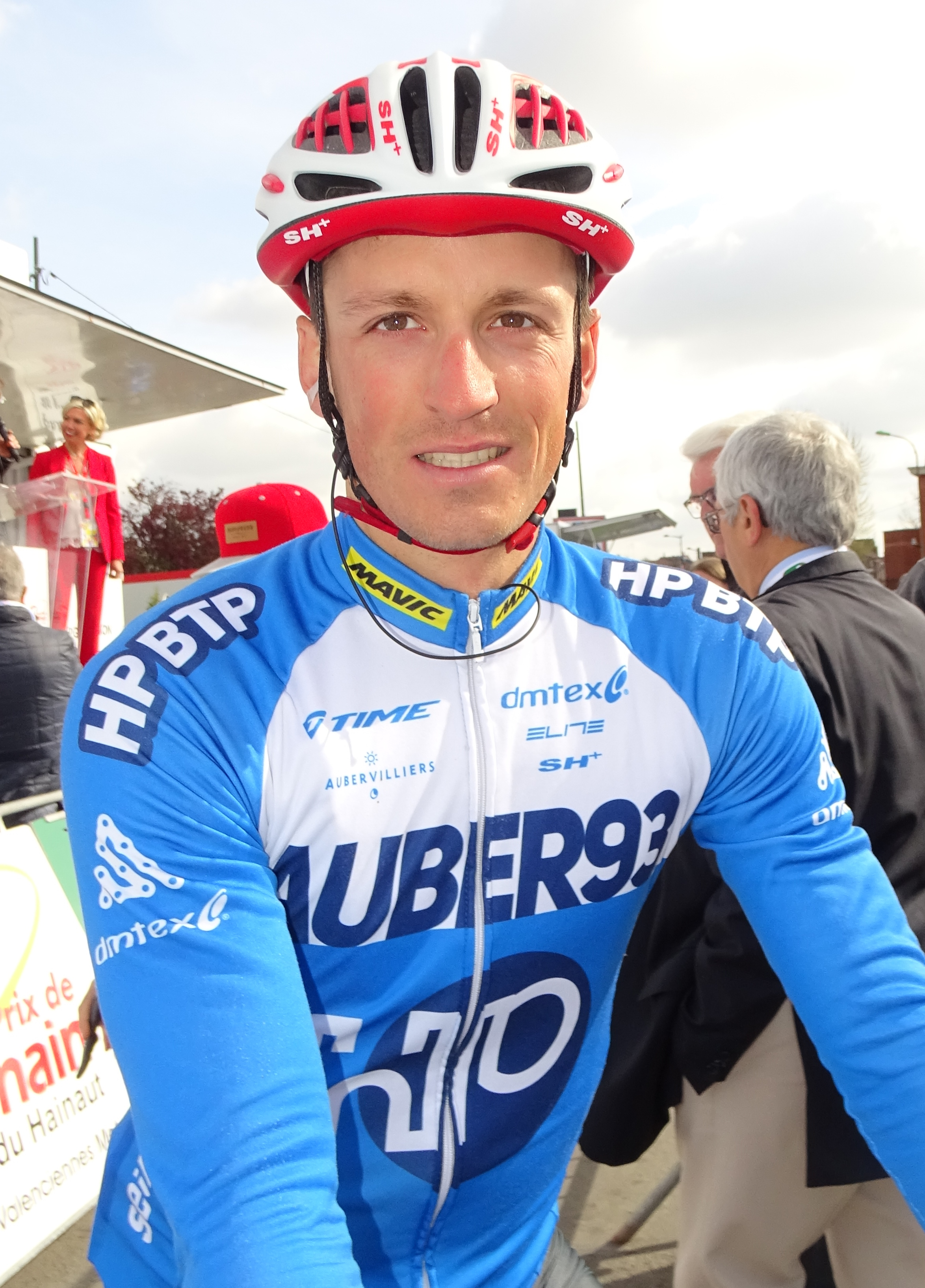
- Le Cunff in 2017

Personal information
- Full name: Kévin Le Cunff
- Born: 16 March 1988 (age 38) Longjumeau, France

Cycling career
- Sport: Cycling
- Current team: VC Rouen 76
- Disciplines: Road; Track
- Role: Rider

Amateur teams
- 2008: US Melun
- 2009: Les Bleus de France
- 2010: AS Marcoussis
- 2011: CM Aubervilliers 93
- 2014: AS Corbeil-Essonnes
- 2015: Team Peltrax–CS Dammarie-lès-Lys
- 2016: CM Aubervilliers 93
- 2020–2023: Dunkerque Grande Littoral–Cofidis
- 2024–: VC Rouen 76

Professional team
- 2017–2019: HP BTP–Auber93
Medal record
Representing France
Men's para-cycling
Paralympic Games
Gold medal – first place	2020 Tokyo	Road race C4–5
Gold medal – first place	2024 Paris	Road time trial C4
Silver medal – second place	2024 Paris	Road race C4–5
Road World Championships
Gold medal – first place	2022 Baie-Comeau	Road race C5
Gold medal – first place	2023 Glasgow	Road race C4
Gold medal – first place	2023 Glasgow	Time trial C4
Silver medal – second place	2024 Zurich	Time trial C4
Silver medal – second place	2025 Ronse	Road race C4
Bronze medal – third place	2022 Baie-Comeau	Time trial C5
Bronze medal – third place	2024 Zurich	Road race C4
Bronze medal – third place	2025 Ronse	Time trial C4
Track World Championships
Gold medal – first place	2023 Glasgow	Individual pursuit C4
Gold medal – first place	2023 Glasgow	Omnium C4
Gold medal – first place	2024 Rio de Janeiro	Scratch race C4
Silver medal – second place	2024 Rio de Janeiro	Individual pursuit C4
Silver medal – second place	2024 Rio de Janeiro	Omnium C4

Kévin Le Cunff (born 16 March 1988) is a French para-cyclist, who currently rides for French amateur team VC Rouen 76.

== Career ==
Born with two clubbed feet, Le Cunff competes both in elite races and in category C4 and C5 in Paralympic competitions. As a Paralympian, he won the road race C4-5 at the 2020 Summer Paralympics, and has won three gold medals each at the UCI Para-cycling Track World Championships and the UCI Para-cycling Road World Championships. Le Cunff also competed professionally for UCI Continental team HP BTP–Auber93 from 2017 to 2019, notably winning the 2018 Boucles de l'Aulne.

== Major results ==
=== Road ===
2016
3rd Paris–Chauny
2017
5th Boucles de l'Aulne
5th Tro-Bro Léon
5th Paris–Chauny
8th Tour de Vendée
9th Paris–Camembert
2018 (1 pro win)
1st Boucles de l'Aulne
5th Tour du Doubs
2019
4th Grand Prix de Plumelec-Morbihan
8th Overall Boucles de la Mayenne
8th Tro-Bro Léon
9th Classic Loire Atlantique
9th Grand Prix La Marseillaise
10th La Drôme Classic
10th La Roue Tourangelle
2021
1st Road race C4-5, Summer Paralympics
2022
UCI World Championships

1st Road race C5
3rd Time trial C5

7th Grand Prix de la Somme
2023
UCI World Championships

1st Road race C4
1st Time trial C4

10th Overall Boucle de l'Artois

=== Track ===
2023
UCI Para World Championships

1st Individual pursuit C4
1st Omnium C4

2024
UCI Para World Championships

1st Scratch C4
2nd Individual pursuit C4
