= Cycling at the 2016 Summer Paralympics – Men's individual pursuit C1 =

Men's individual pursuit C1 at the XV Paralympic Games
- Dates: 8 September
- Competitors: 12 from 9 nations

Medalists
1st place, gold medalist(s)		Li Zhangyu	China
2nd place, silver medalist(s)		Ross Wilson	Canada
3rd place, bronze medalist(s)		Erich Winkler	Germany

The men's individual pursuit C1 took place on 8 September 2016.

The event began with a qualifying race over 3000m. Each of the athletes competed individually in a time-trial basis. The fastest two riders raced for the gold medal and the third- and fourth-fastest riders raced for the bronze.

== Preliminaries ==
Q: Qualifier for gold medal final
Qb: Qualifier for bronze medal final
WR: World Record
PR: Paralympic Record

Men's individual Pursuit C1 - Preliminaries
Rank	Name	Nationality	Time	Notes
1	Li Zhangyu	China	03:50.37	WR Q
2	Ross Wilson	Canada	03:53.67	Q
3	Erich Winkler	Germany	04:02.66	Qb
4	Arnoud Nijhuis	Netherlands	04:04.05	Qb
5	Michael Teuber	Germany	04:04.11	
6	Billy Lister	United States	04:08.28	
7	Giancarlo Masini	Italy	04:14.79	
8	Rodrigo Lopez	Argentina	04:17.97	
9	Juan Jose Mendez Fernandez	Spain	04:19.16	

== Finals ==
Men's individual Pursuit C1 - Medal Finals
Rank	Name	Nationality	Result
Gold Final
1st place, gold medalist(s)	Li Zhangyu	China	
2nd place, silver medalist(s)	Ross Wilson	Canada	OVL
Bronze Final
3rd place, bronze medalist(s)	Arnoud Nijhuis	Netherlands	
4	Erich Winkler	Germany	OVL
