= Damián Ramos =

Spanish Para-cyclist (born 1986)

Personal information
- Full name: Damián Ramos Sánchez
- Nationality: Spanish
- Born: 23 June 1986 (age 40)
- Home town: A Coruña, Spain

Sport
- Sport: Para-cycling
- Disability class: C4
Medal record
Men's para-cycling
Representing Spain
Paralympic Games
Bronze medal – third place	2024 Paris	Road time trial C4
European Championships
Gold medal – first place	2023 Rotterdam	Road race C4
Bronze medal – third place	2023 Rotterdam	Road time trial C4

Damián Ramos Sánchez (born 23 June 1986) is a Spanish para-cyclist. He represented Spain at the 2024 Summer Paralympics.

== Career ==
Sánchez represented Spain at the 2024 Summer Paralympics and won a bronze medal in the road time trial C4 event.
