= Gatien Le Rousseau =

French paralympic cyclist

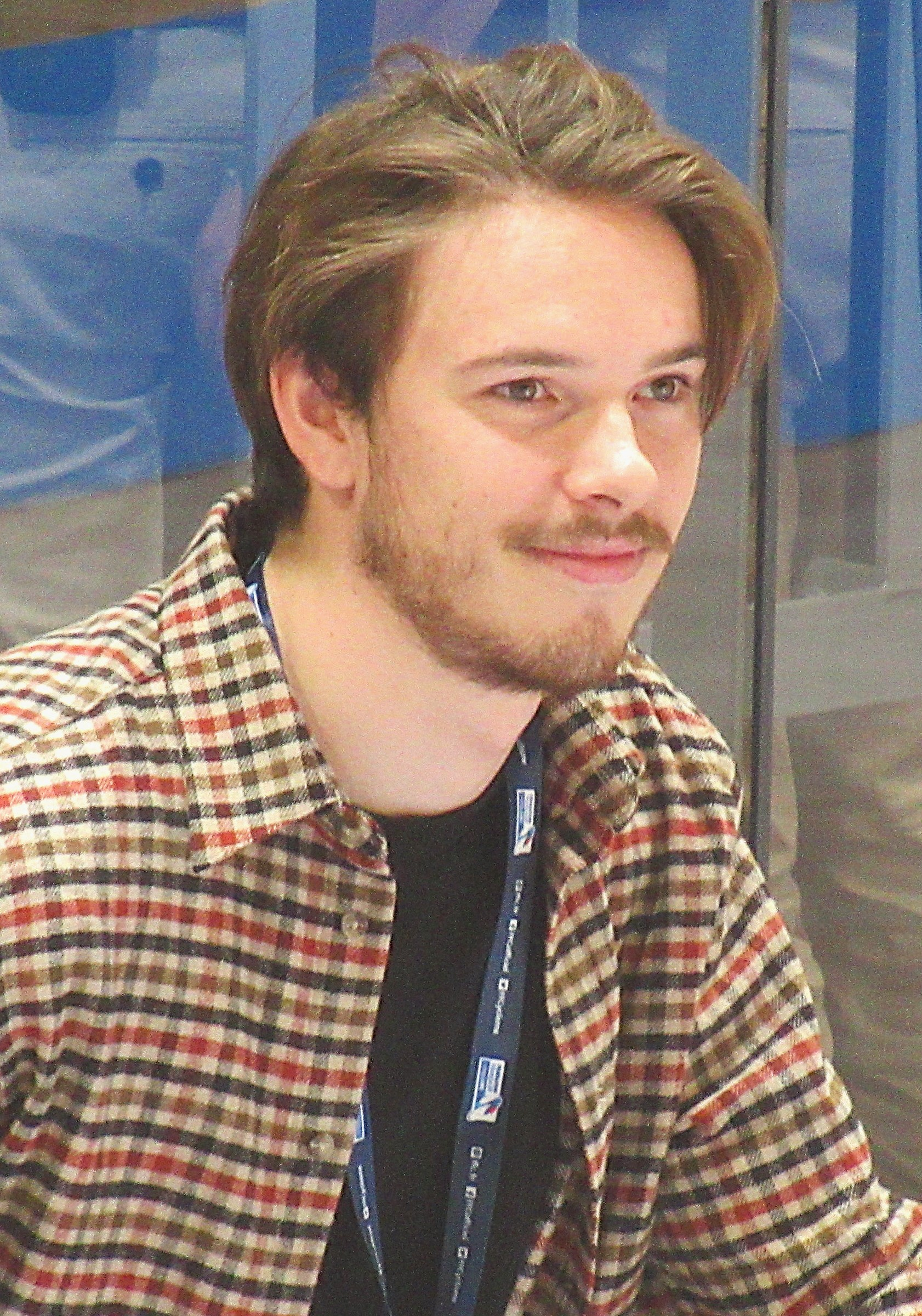

Personal information
- Born: 21 November 2002 (age 23)

Sport
- Country: France
- Sport: Para-cycling
Medal record
Men's para-cycling
Representing France
Paralympic Games
Silver medal – second place	2024 Paris	Road time trial C4
Bronze medal – third place	2024 Paris	Individual pursuit C4
Road World Championships
Gold medal – first place	2024 Zurich	Road race C4
Silver medal – second place	2023 Glasgow	Time trial C4
Silver medal – second place	2025 Ronse	Time trial C4
Bronze medal – third place	2024 Zurich	Time trial C4
Track World Championships
Gold medal – first place	2025 Rio de Janeiro	Elimination C4
Silver medal – second place	2025 Rio de Janeiro	Scratch race C4

Gatien Le Rousseau (born 21 November 2002) is a French paralympic cyclist. He competed at the 2024 Summer Paralympics, winning the bronze medal in the men's pursuit C4 event.
