= Cycling at the 2016 Summer Paralympics – Men's individual pursuit C2 =

Men's individual pursuit C2 at the XV Paralympic Games
- Venue: Rio Olympic Velodrome
- Dates: 8 September
- Competitors: 10 from 9 nations

Medalists
1st place, gold medalist(s)		Liang Guihua	China
2nd place, silver medalist(s)		Tristen Chernove	Canada
3rd place, bronze medalist(s)		Louis Rolfe	Great Britain

The men's individual pursuit C2 took place on 8 September 2016.

The event began with a qualifying race over 3000m. Each of the athletes competed individually in a time-trial basis. The fastest two riders raced for the gold medal and the third- and fourth-fastest riders raced for the bronze.

== Preliminaries ==
Q: Qualifier
WR: World Record
PR: Paralympic Record

Men's individual Pursuit C2 - Preliminaries
Rank	Name	Nationality	Time	Avg. Speed
1	Liang Guihua	China	3:42.916 PR	48.448
2	Tristen Chernove	Canada	3:44.731	48.057
3	Alvaro Galvis Becerra	Colombia	3:49.238	47.112
4	Louis Rolfe	Great Britain	3:49.908	46.975
5	Colin Lynch	Ireland	3:53.300	46.292
6	Ivo Koblasa	Czech Republic	3:55.437	45.872
7	Maurice Far Eckhard Tio	Spain	3:57.786	45.418
8	Shota Kawamoto	Japan	4:06.831	43.754
9	Roger Bolliger	Switzerland	4:13.918	42.533
10	Mumuni Alem	Ghana	4:59.965	36.004

== Finals ==
Men's individual Pursuit C2 - Medal Finals
Gold Final
Rank	Name	Nationality	Result	Avg Speed
1st place, gold medalist(s)	Guihua Liang	China	3:44.553	48.095
2nd place, silver medalist(s)	Tristen Chernove	Canada	3:47.412	47.49
Bronze Final
Rank	Name	Nationality	Result	Avg Speed
3rd place, bronze medalist(s)	Louis Rolfe	Great Britain	3:47.951	47.378
4	Alvaro Galvis Becerra	Colombia	3:49.819	46.993
