= Louis Rolfe =

British Paralympic cyclist (born 1997)

Louis Rolfe MBE
Personal information
- Nationality: British
- Born: 21 July 1997 (age 28) Cambridge, Cambridgeshire, England

Sport
- Country: Great Britain
- Sport: Track cycling
- Disability class: C2
Medal record
Representing Great Britain
Men's Para-cycling
Summer Paralympics
Bronze medal – third place	2016 Rio	Ind. Pursuit C2
Gold medal – first place	2016 Rio	Team Sprint C1-C5
Track World Championships
Gold medal – first place	2016 Montichiari	Team Sprint
Bronze medal – third place	2016 Montichiari	1km time trial (C2)

Louis Rolfe (born 21 July 1997) is a British Paralympic track cyclist competing in C2 classification events. Rolfe came to note as a cyclist during the 2016 UCI Para-cycling Track World Championships where he was part of the gold medal-winning British team sprint event along with fellow cyclists Jon-Allan Butterworth and Jody Cundy.

== Personal history ==
Rolfe was born in 1997 in Cambridge, England. He was born ten weeks premature and has cerebral palsy and hydrocephalus. He attended Coleridge Community College and Parkside Community College from 2008 to 2013.

== Cycling career ==
Rolfe was inspired to take up para-sport after being inspired by the events of the 2012 Summer Olympics and Paralympics in London. In December 2012 he attended a para-festival where he was tested by Great Britain Cycling Team coaches. Rolfe was subsequently accepted onto the British Para-cycling Development Programme. He was classified as a C2 classification cyclist and was part of the Great Britain team at the 2015 Newport Para-cycling International. In Newport he won a silver as part of the men's team sprint and a bronze in the 3 km sprint, and was selected to represent his country at the 2015 UCI Para-cycling Track World Championships in Apeldoorn in the Netherlands. The World Championships provided experience for Rolfe and he finished fifth as a part of the team sprint, seventh in the 1 km time trial and 10th in the individual pursuit.

In 2016, in the buildup to the Rio Paralympics, Rolfe represented Britain at his second Track World Championships, this time in Montichiari. Rolfe entered both the individual pursuit and the time trial, winning a bronze medal in the latter. Originally he was not part of the Team sprint as the line-up was intended to be Jon-Allan Butterworth, Kadeena Cox and Jody Cundy, but prior to the Championship Cox was reclassified and Rolfe was brought in as a late replacement. Despite never having raced together, the three posted a final time of 49.268 to win the gold and set a new world record time.

In August 2016 Rolfe was named as part of the Great Britain team for the 2016 Summer Paralympics. In September 2016 at the Rio Paralympics Louis won bronze in the individual pursuit 3000m in the C2 class and gold in the 750m team sprint C1-C5 with Jon-Allan Butterworth and Jody Cundy in a world record time of 48.635 Seconds having already posted the previous record in qualifying.

On 31 December 2016 Rolfe was appointed Member of the Order of the British Empire (MBE) in the 2017 New Year Honours List for services to cycling.
