= Diego Germán Dueñas =

Colombian Paralympic cyclist (born 1990)

Personal information
- Full name: Diego Germán Dueñas Gómez
- Born: 17 May 1990 (age 36) Bogotá, Colombia

Cycling career
- Sport: Cycling
- Disciplines: Track, Road
Medal record
Men's para cycling
Representing Colombia
Summer Paralympics
Bronze medal – third place	2016 Rio de Janeiro	Individual pursuit C4
Bronze medal – third place	2020 Tokyo	Individual pursuit C4
Road World Championships
Bronze medal – third place	2017 Pietermaritzburg	Time trial C4
Track World Championships
Bronze medal – third place	2022 Saint-Quentin-en-Yvelines	Individual pursuit C4
Bronze medal – third place	2025 Rio de Janeiro	Scratch race C4
Bronze medal – third place	2025 Rio de Janeiro	Elimination C4
Parapan American Games
Silver medal – second place	2011 Guadalajara	Road time trial C1-5
Silver medal – second place	2015 Toronto	Road race C4-5
Bronze medal – third place	2019 Lima	Road time trial C5
South American Para Games
Silver medal – second place	2026 Valledupar	Time trial C4-5

Diego Germán Dueñas Gómez (Note: In this Spanish name, the first or paternal surname is Dueñas and the second or maternal family name is Gómez.) (born 17 May 1990) is a Colombian racing cyclist who competes in para-cycling road and track events. At the 2016 and 2020 Summer Paralympics, he won the bronze medal in the individual pursuit.
