= Kyle Bridgwood =

Australian Paralympic cyclist

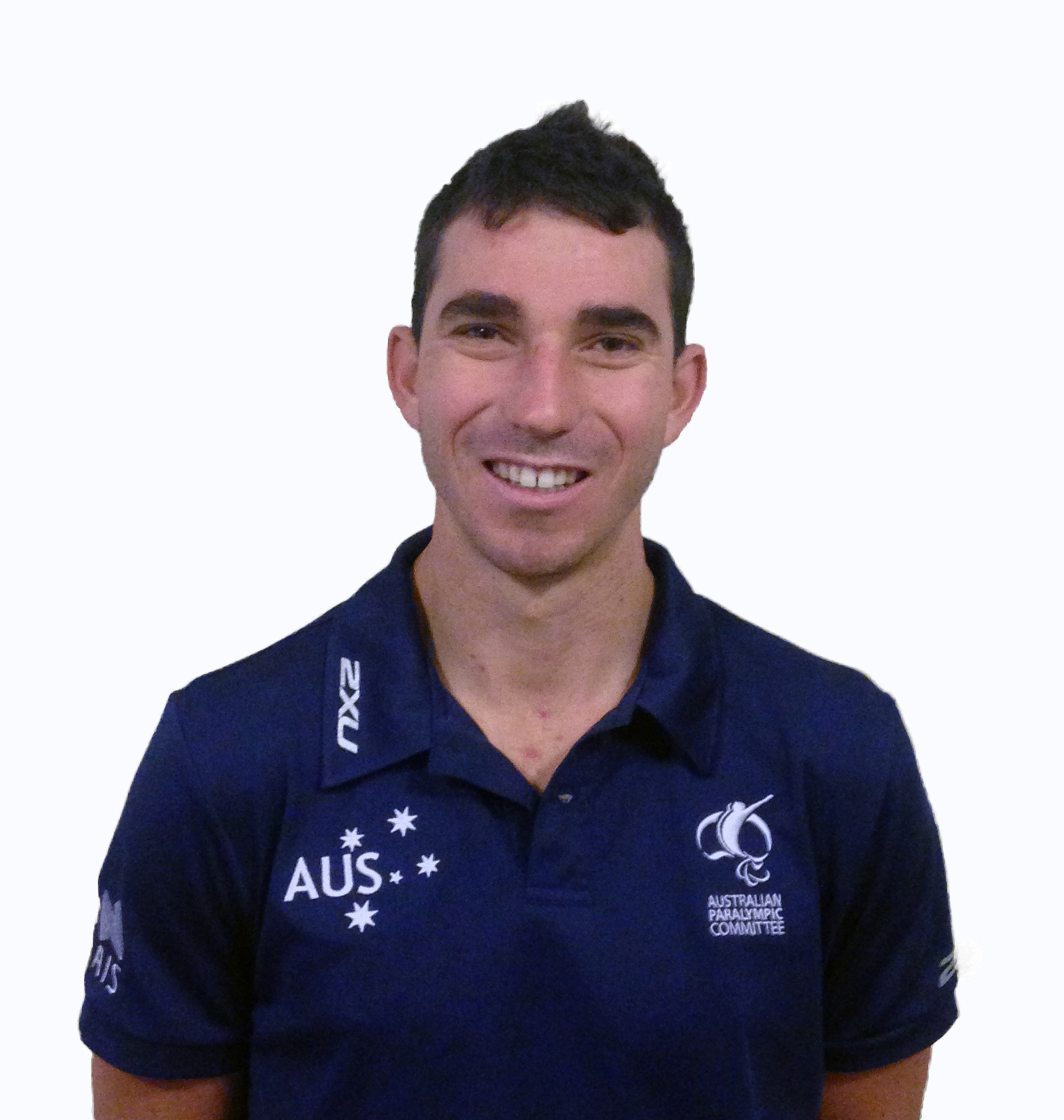
- 2016 Australian Paralympic team portrait

Personal information
- Full name: Kyle Ivan Bridgwood
- Nickname: Bridgy
- Nationality: Australian
- Born: 23 February 1989 (age 37) Durban, South Africa

Sport
- Disability class: C4
Medal record
Men's Cycling
Representing Australia
Paralympic Games
Silver medal – second place	2016 Rio	Men's Individual Pursuit C5
Silver medal – second place	2016 Rio	Men's Time Trial C4
UCI Para-cycling Road World Championships
Gold medal – first place	2015 Nottwil	Men's Time Trial C4
Silver medal – second place	2017 Pietermaritzburg	Men's Time Trial C4
Silver medal – second place	2017 Pietermaritzburg	Men's Road Race C4-5
Bronze medal – third place	2018 Maniago	Men's Time Trial C4
UCI Para-cycling Track World Championships
Gold medal – first place	2016 Montichiari	Men's Scratch Race C4–5
Silver medal – second place	2016 Montichiari	Men's Individual Pursuit C4
Silver medal – second place	2017 Los Angeles	Men's Individual Pursuit C4
Bronze medal – third place	2017 Los Angeles	Men's Time Trial C4
Silver medal – second place	2018 Rio	Men's Individual Pursuit C4

Kyle Ivan Bridgwood (born 23 February 1989) is an Australian Para cyclist from South Africa. He won silver medals in the Men's Individual Pursuit C4 and Men's Road Time Trial C4 at the 2016 Rio Paralympics.

== Personal ==
Bridgwood was born on 23 February 1989 in South Africa. Bridgwood moved to Australia at the age of 11. He joined the Australian Army in 2007. In 2011, he was hit by a car before work. He suffered a severed patella tendon, fractured kneecap, broken back and neck. The accident led to an acquired brain injury that affects his coordination and fine-motor control. After the injury, he returned to cycling and represented the Australian Army at the 2012 United States Marines Corps Trials. He was medically discharged from the Australian army. In 2015, he studying International Studies at the University of the Sunshine Coast. He lives in Buderim, Queensland.

== Cycling ==
He is classified as a C4 cyclist. He returned to cycling after his accident and in 2012 at the United States Marines Corps Trials he won the gold medal in the Men's 30 km Open Cycle and silver medal in basketball.

Bridgwood won the Men's Time Trial and finished second at the Men's Road Race at the 2015 Cycling Australia Para-cycling Road National Championships. At the 2015 UCI Para-cycling Road World Championships in Nottwil, Switzerland, he won the gold medal in the Men's Time Trial C4 and finished fifth in the Men's Road Race C4.

In 2015, he rode for Data#3 Symantec Team in Australian National Road Racing Series.

At the 2016 UCI Para-cycling Track World Championships in Montichiari, Italy, he won the gold medal in the Men's Scratch Race C4–5 and the silver medal in the Men's 4 km Individual Pursuit C4.

He won silver medals in the Men's Individual Pursuit C4 at the 2016 Rio Paralympics and Men's Road Time Trial C4. He also finished in the Men's Road Race C4-5.

At the 2017 UCI Para-cycling Track World Championships in Los Angeles, United States, he won a silver medal in the Men's 4 km Individual Pursuit C4 and bronze medal in the Men's 1 km Time Trial C4.

At the 2017 UCI Para-cycling Road World Championships in Pietermaritzburg, South Africa, he won silver medals in the Men's Road Time Trial C4 and Men's Road Race C4-5.

Bridgwood won the silver medal in the Men's 4 km Individual Pursuit C4 at the 2018 UCI Para-cycling Road World Championships, Rio de Janeiro, Brazil

He won the bronze medal in the Men's Time Trial C4 at 2018 UCI Para-cycling Road World Championships, Maniago, Italy.

== Recognition ==
- 2015 - University of the Sunshine Coast Sportsperson of the Year
- 2016 - University of the Sunshine Coast Sportsperson of the Year
