= Edwin Fabián Mátiz Ruiz =

Colombian paralympic cyclist

Personal information
- Born: 6 November 1992 (age 33) Bogotá, Colombia

Sport
- Country: Colombia
- Sport: Track cycling
Medal record
Track cycling
Representing Colombia
Paralympic Games
Bronze medal – third place	2016 Rio de Janeiro	Individual pursuit C5
Parapan American Games
Gold medal – first place	2023 Santiago	Time trial C1-5
Silver medal – second place	2015 Toronto	Time trial C1-5
Bronze medal – third place	2015 Toronto	Individual pursuit C4-5
Bronze medal – third place	2019 Lima	Time trial C1-5
Bronze medal – third place	2023 Santiago	Individual pursuit C4-5

Edwin Fabián Mátiz Ruiz (born 6 November 1992) is a Colombian paralympic cyclist. He competed at the 2016 Summer Paralympics in the cycling competition, winning the bronze medal in the men's individual pursuit C5 event.
