= Yehor Dementyev =

Ukrainian cyclist

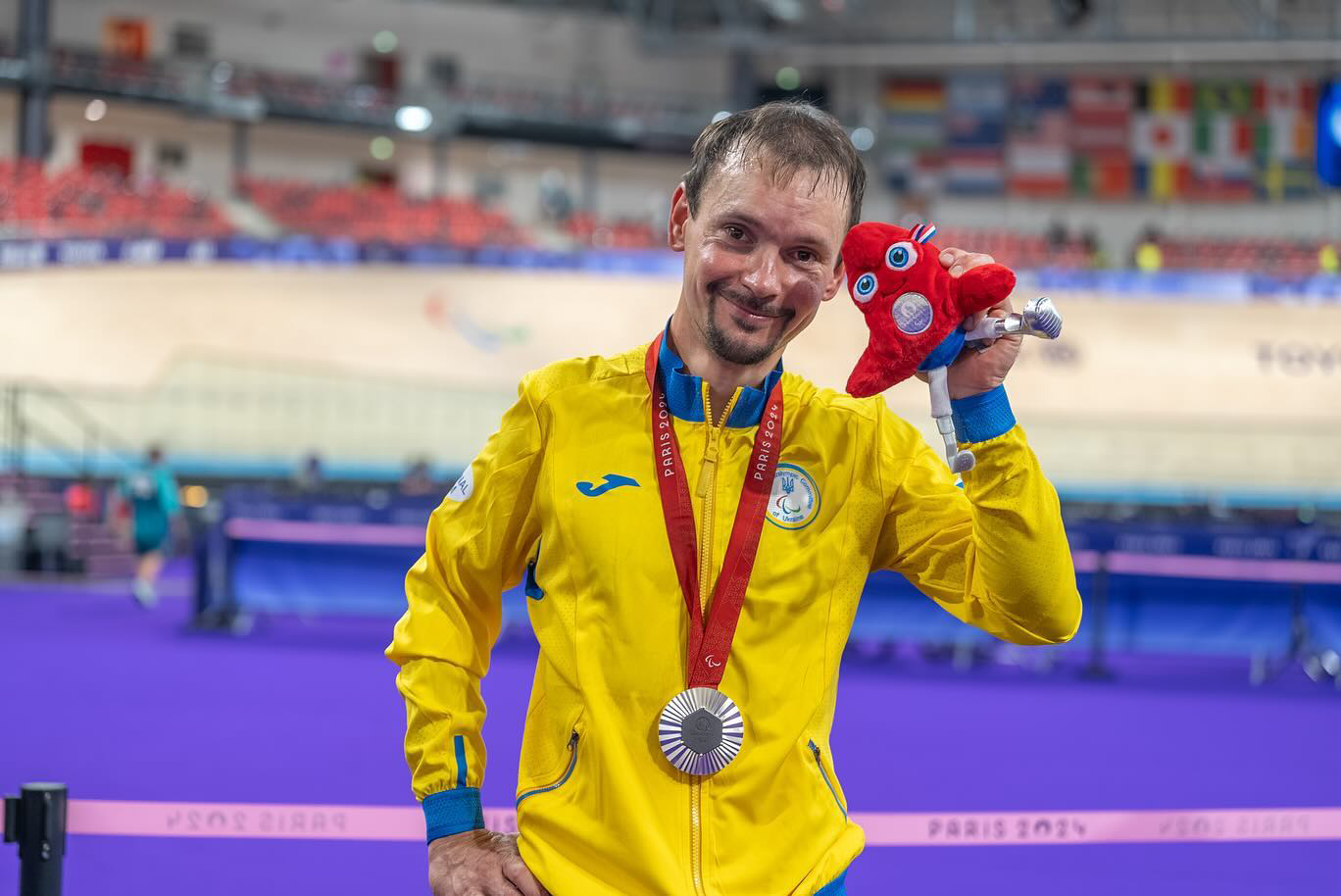
- Dementyev at the 2024 Summer Paralympics

Personal information
- Full name: Yehor Viktorovych Dementyev; Ukrainian: Єгор Вікторович Дементьєв
- Born: 12 March 1987 (age 39) Kremenchuk, Ukrainian SSR, Soviet Union

Cycling career
- Sport: Cycling
- Current team: Ankuva Cycling Team
- Discipline: Road
- Role: Rider

Amateur teams
- 2023: Ferei–CCN Metalac
- 2024–: Ankuva Cycling Team

Professional teams
- 2009–2010: ISD Sport Donetsk
- 2016–2017: ISD–Jorbi
- 2018–2022: Team Novak
Medal record
Men's para-cycling
Representing Ukraine
Paralympic Games
Gold medal – first place	2012 London	Road race C4-5
Gold medal – first place	2012 London	Time trial C5
Gold medal – first place	2016 Rio de Janeiro	Time trial C5
Gold medal – first place	2024 Paris	Road race C4-5
Silver medal – second place	2020 Tokyo	Road race C4-5
Silver medal – second place	2020 Tokyo	Time trial C4-5
Silver medal – second place	2024 Paris	Individual pursuit C5
Bronze medal – third place	2020 Tokyo	Individual pursuit C5
Track World Championships
Gold medal – first place	2012 Carson	Road race C4-5
Gold medal – first place	2018 Rio de Janeiro	Individual pursuit C5
Gold medal – first place	2023 Glasgow	Omnium C5
Silver medal – second place	2014 Aguascalientes	Individual pursuit C5
Silver medal – second place	2019 Apeldoorn	Individual pursuit C5
Silver medal – second place	2022 Saint-Quentin-en-Yvelines	Individual pursuit C5
Silver medal – second place	2023 Glasgow	Scratch race C5
Silver medal – second place	2023 Glasgow	Individual pursuit C5
Silver medal – second place	2026 Apeldoorn	Scratch race C5
Bronze medal – third place	2011 Montichiari	Individual pursuit C5
Bronze medal – third place	2014 Apeldoorn	Individual pursuit C5
Bronze medal – third place	2016 Montichiari	Individual pursuit C5
Bronze medal – third place	2020 Milton	Omnium C5
Road World Championships
Gold medal – first place	2015 Nottwill	Time trial C5
Gold medal – first place	2024 Zurich	Road race C5
Silver medal – second place	2015 Nottwill	Road race C5
Silver medal – second place	2017 Pietermaritzburg	Time trial C5
Silver medal – second place	2018 Maniago	Road race C5
Silver medal – second place	2021 Cascais	Road race C5
Silver medal – second place	2023 Glasgow	Road race C5
Silver medal – second place	2025 Ronse	Road race C5
Bronze medal – third place	2018 Maniago	Time trial C5
Bronze medal – third place	2024 Zurich	Time trial C5

Yehor Viktorovych Dementyev (Ukrainian: Єгор Вікторович Дементьєв; born 12 March 1987 in Kremenchuk) is a Ukrainian cyclist, who currently rides for Turkish amateur team Ankuva Cycling Team.

== Career ==
As he was born with one arm shorter than the other, Dementyev is eligible to compete in the Paralympic Games. He won multiple gold medals for Ukraine at the 2012 Summer Paralympics.

== Major results ==
2009
1st Road race, National Under-23 Road Championships
3rd Trofeo Gianfranco Bianchin
6th Tallinn–Tartu GP
2010
1st National Criterium Championships
4th Overall Grand Prix of Adygeya
9th Grand Prix of Donetsk
2011
3rd Overall Tour of Gallipoli
10th Overall Tour of Alanya
2017
1st Minsk Cup
2nd Horizon Park Classic
4th Overall Five Rings of Moscow
7th Overall Tour of Mersin
8th Horizon Park Race Maidan
2018
1st Stage 1 Tour of Szeklerland
2nd Horizon Park Race for Peace
8th Horizon Park Classic
2019
3rd Horizon Park Race for Peace
4th Horizon Park Classic
