= Patrik Kuril =

Slovak Paralympic cyclist

Personal information
- Nationality: Slovak
- Born: 18 December 1979 (age 46) Partizanske, Slovakia

Sport
- Country: Slovakia
- Sport: Para-cycling
- Disability class: C4
- Club: Sportakus Cycling
- Coached by: Branislav Reznak
Medal record
Representing Slovakia
Road bicycle racing
Paralympic Games
Gold medal – first place	2020 Tokyo	Time trial C4
Bronze medal – third place	2016 Rio de Janeiro	Time trial C4
European Championships
Silver medal – second place	2023 Rotterdam	Road race C4

Patrik Kuril (born 18 December 1979) is a Slovak para-cyclist. He won a gold medal at the 2020 Summer Paralympics in the Men's road time trial C4 ahead of teammate Jozef Metelka. He also won a bronze medal at the 2016 Summer Paralympics in the Men's road time trial C4.

== Career ==
He competed at 2021 UCI Para-cycling Road World Championships and won a gold medal in the 92.4 km Road Race C4 event.
