= Jozef Metelka =

Slovak Paralympic cyclist

Personal information
- Nationality: Slovak
- Born: 8 September 1986 (age 39) Piešťany, Czechoslovakia

Sport
- Country: Slovakia
- Sport: Para-cycling
- Disability class: C4
- Club: Beeline Bicycles Racing Team
- Coached by: Kyleigh Manners; Tom Kirk
Medal record
Representing Slovakia
Road bicycle racing
Paralympic Games
Gold medal – first place	2016 Rio de Janeiro	Time trial C4
Gold medal – first place	2024 Paris	Pursuit C4
Silver medal – second place	2020 Tokyo	Time trial C4
Track cycling
Paralympic Games
Gold medal – first place	2016 Rio de Janeiro	Individual pursuit C4
Gold medal – first place	2020 Tokyo	Individual pursuit C4
Gold medal – first place	2024 Paris	Individual pursuit C4
Silver medal – second place	2016 Rio de Janeiro	1 km time trial C4–5
Bronze medal – third place	2020 Tokyo	1 km time trial C4–5
Track World Championships
Gold medal – first place	2020 Milton	Scratch race C4
Gold medal – first place	2020 Milton	Individual pursuit C4
Gold medal – first place	2020 Milton	Omnium C4
Gold medal – first place	2022 Saint-Quentin-en-Yvelines	Individual pursuit C4
Gold medal – first place	2022 Saint-Quentin-en-Yvelines	Scratch race C4
Silver medal – second place	2020 Milton	Kilo C4
Silver medal – second place	2023 Glasgow	Individual pursuit C4
Silver medal – second place	2023 Glasgow	Omnium C4
Bronze medal – third place	2022 Saint-Quentin-en-Yvelines	Kilo C4

Jozef Metelka (born 8 September 1986) is a Slovak Paralympic cyclist competing in C4 classification events. He won a silver medal at the 2020 Summer Paralympics in the Men's road time trial C4 behind teammate Patrik Kuril.
