= Cycling at the 2016 Summer Paralympics – Men's road race B =

Cycling, Men's road race B at the XV Paralympic Games
- Venue: Pontal, Rio
- Dates: September 17
- Competitors: 21 (and 21 pilots)

Medalists
| 1st place, gold medalist(s) | | Vincent Ter Schure; Timo Fransen | Netherlands |
| 2nd place, silver medalist(s) | | Ignacio Avila Rodriguez; Joan Font Bertoli | Spain |
| 3rd place, bronze medalist(s) | | Steve Bate; Adam Duggleby | Great Britain |

The men's road race B cycling event at the 2016 Summer Paralympics took place on September 17 at Pontal, Rio. The race distance was 60 km.

== Results : Men's road race B ==
| Rank | Names | Nationality | Classification | Time | Deficit |
|---|---|---|---|---|---|
| 1st place, gold medalist(s) | Vincent Ter Schure; Timo Fransen | Netherlands | B | 02:26:33 | - |
| 2nd place, silver medalist(s) | Ignacio Avila Rodriguez; Joan Font Bertoli | Spain | B | s.t. | s.t. |
| 3rd place, bronze medalist(s) | Steve Bate; Adam Duggleby | Great Britain | B | 02:27:03 | +30" |
| 4 | Carlos Gonzalez Garcia; Noel Martin Infante | Spain | B | 02:27:05 | +32" |
| 5 | Kieran Modra; David Edwards | Australia | B | 02:27:15 | +42" |
| 6 | Stephen De Vries; Patrick Bos | Netherlands | B | 02:31:23 | +04:50 |
| 7 | Przemyslaw Wegner; Artur Korc | Poland | B | 02:31:46 | +05:13 |
| 8 | Vladislav Janovjak; Jan Gallik | Slovakia | B | 02:32:06 | +05:33 |
| 9 | Emanuele Bersini; Riccardo Panizza | Italy | B | s.t. | s.t. |
| 10 | Jarmo Ollanketo; Tommi Martikainen | Finland | B | 02:32:09 | +05:36 |
| 11 | Aaron Scheidies; Benjamin Collins | United States | B | s.t. | s.t. |
| 12 | Peter Ryan; Marcin Mizgajski | Ireland | B | 02:39:44 | +13:11 |
| 13 | Matt Formston; Nick Yallouris | Australia | B | 02:41:48 | +15:15 |
| 14 | Mohd Wahab; Muhamad Misbah | Malaysia | B | 02:41:52 | +15:19 |
| 15 | Raul Villalba; Ezequiel Romero | Argentina | B | 02:44:55 | +18:22 |
| -- | Damien Vereker; Sean Hahessy | Ireland | B | DNF | n/a |
| -- | Tristan Bangma; Teun Mulder | Netherlands | B | DNF | n/a |
| -- | Marcin Polak; Michał Ładosz | Poland | B | DNF | n/a |
| -- | Daniel Chalifour; Jean-Michel Lachance | Canada | B | DNF | n/a |
| -- | Athanasios Barakas; Konstantinos Troulinos | Greece | B | DNF | n/a |
| -- | Neil Fachie; Pete Mitchell | Great Britain | B | DNF | n/a |
| -- | Arnold Butu; Laszlo Garamszegi | Hungary | B | DNS | n/a |
