= Cycling at the 2016 Summer Paralympics – Men's road time trial B =

Cycling, Men's road time trial B at the XV Paralympic Games
- Venue: Flamengo Park
- Dates: 14 September
- Competitors: 24

Medalists
1st place, gold medalist(s)		Steve Bate; Guide :Adam Duggleby	Great Britain
2nd place, silver medalist(s)		Vincent ter Schure; Guide :Timo Fransen	Netherlands
3rd place, bronze medalist(s)		Kieran Modra; Guide :David Edwards	Australia

The Men's time trial B road cycling event at the 2016 Summer Paralympics took place on the afternoon of 14 September at Flamengo Park, Pontal. 24 riders (with pilots) competed over two laps of a fifteen kilometre course.

The B classification is for cyclists with visual impairment. Sighted guides act as pilots in these events, which take place on tandem bikes. The event was won by British riders Steve Bate and pilot Adam Duggleby, adding to their gold medal on the track in the individual pursuit. Road race gold medalist Vincent ter Schure, piloted by Timo Fransen took the silver for the Netherlands, and Australia's Kieran Modra won the bronze.

== Results ==
Men's road time trial B. 14 September 2016, Rio.

Rank	Rider Guide	Nationality	Time	Deficit
1st place, gold medalist(s)	Steve Bate; Guide :Adam Duggleby	Great Britain	34:35.33	0
2nd place, silver medalist(s)	Vincent Ter Schure; Guide :Timo Fransen	Netherlands	34:44.16	+0:08.83
3rd place, bronze medalist(s)	Kieran Modra; Guide :David Edwards	Australia	35:09.06	+0:33.73
4	Stephen De Vries; Guide :Patrick Bos	Netherlands	35:52.73	+1:17.40
5	Przemyslaw Wegner; Guide :Artur Korc	Poland	36:18.39	+1:43.06
6	Damien Vereker; Guide :Sean Hahessy	Ireland	36:23.05	+1:47.72
7	Emanuele Bersini; Guide :Riccardo Panizza	Italy	36:35.37	+2:00.04
8	Carlos Gonzalez Garcia; Guide :Noel Martin Infante	Spain	36:35.43	+2:00.10
9	Jarmo Ollanketo; Guide :Tommi Martikainen	Finland	36:39.83	+2:04.50
10	Ignacio Avila Rodriguez; Guide :Joan Font Bertoli	Spain	36:45.05	+2:09.72
11	Marcin Polak; Guide :Michał Ładosz	Poland	36:50.06	+2:14.73
12	Aaron Scheidies; Guide :Benjamin Collins	United States	36:53.10	+2:17.77
13	Matt Formston; Guide :Nick Yallouris	Australia	36:55.25	+2:19.92
14	Vladislav Janovjak; Guide :Jan Gallik	Slovakia	36:57.24	+2:21.91
15	Daniel Chalifour; Guide :Jean-Michel Lachance	Canada	37:09.53	+2:34.20
16	Tristan Bangma; Guide :Teun Mulder	Netherlands	38:02.81	+3:27.48
17	Peter Ryan; Guide :Marcin Mizgajski	Ireland	38:59.85	+4:24.52
18	Mohd Wahab; Guide :Muhamad Misbah	Malaysia	40:06.96	+5:31.63
19	Raul Villalba; Guide :Ezequiel Romero	Argentina	40:46.89	+6:11.56
20	Kai Kruse; Guide :Stefan Nimke	Germany	42:48.42	+8:13.09
21	Athanasios Barakas; Guide :Konstantinos Troulinos	Greece	45:38.46	+11:03.1
22	Arnold Butu; Guide :Laszlo Garamszegi	Hungary	46:27.55	+11:52.2
24	James Ball; Guide :Craig MacLean	Great Britain	DNF	0
