= Cycling at the 2020 Summer Paralympics – Men's individual pursuit =

The men's individual pursuit track cycling events at the 2020 Summer Paralympics will take in place between August 25 to 28 2021 at the Izu Velodrome, Japan. Six events will take place in the men's event also over six classifications. The distances of them are: 4000m for the B, C4 and C5 events;and 3000m for the C1, C2 and C3 events.

== Classification ==
Cyclists are given a classification depending on the type and extent of their disability. The classification system allows cyclists to compete against others with a similar level of function. The class number indicates the severity of impairment with "1" being most impaired.

Cycling classes are:

- B: Blind and visually impaired cyclists use a Tandem bicycle with a sighted pilot on the front
- C 1-5: Cyclists with an impairment that affects their legs, arms, and/or trunk but are capable of using a standard bicycle

== Schedule ==
| Q | Qualifying | F | Finals |

Men's individual pursuit
| Event↓/Date → | August 25 | | August 26 | | August 27 | |
|---|---|---|---|---|---|---|
| B | Q | F | | | | |
| C1 | | | Q | F | | |
| C2 | | | Q | F | | |
| C3 | | | Q | F | | |
| C4 | | | | | Q | F |
| C5 | | | | | Q | F |

== Medal table ==
| Rank | NPC | Gold | Silver | Bronze | Total |
|---|---|---|---|---|---|
| 1 | France | 2 | 0 | 1 | 3 |
| 2 | Great Britain | 1 | 2 | 0 | 3 |
| 3 | Netherlands | 1 | 0 | 0 | 1 |
| 3 | RPC | 1 | 0 | 0 | 1 |
| 3 | Slovakia | 1 | 0 | 0 | 1 |
| 6 | Australia | 0 | 2 | 1 | 3 |
| 7 | Canada | 0 | 1 | 0 | 1 |
| 7 | Romania | 0 | 1 | 0 | 1 |
| 9 | China | 0 | 0 | 2 | 2 |
| 10 | Colombia | 0 | 0 | 1 | 1 |
| 10 | Ukraine | 0 | 0 | 1 | 1 |
| 12 | Poland | 0 | 0 | 0 | 0 |
| Totals (12 entries) | | 6 | 6 | 6 | 18 |

== Medal summary ==
| Classification | Gold | | Silver | | Bronze | |
|---|---|---|---|---|---|---|
| B | Tristan Bangma; Netherlands piloted by Patrick Bos | — | Stephen Bate; Great Britain piloted by Adam Duggleby | — OVL | Alexandre Lloveras; France piloted by Corentin Ermenault | 4:08.126 |
| C1 | Mikhail Astashov; RPC | — | Tristen Chernove; Canada | — OVL | Li Zhangyu; China | 3:39.273 |
| C2 | Alexandre Léauté; France | 3:31.478; WR | Darren Hicks; Australia | 3:35.064 | Liang Guihua; China | 3:34.781 |
| C3 | Jaco van Gass; Great Britain | 3:20.987 | Finlay Graham; Great Britain | 3:22.000 | David Nicholas; Australia | 3:25.877 |
| C4 | Jozef Metelka; Slovakia | — | Carol-Eduard Novak; Romania | — OVL | Diego Germán Dueñas; Colombia | 4:35.607 |
| C5 | Dorian Foulon; France | 4:20.757 | Alistair Donohoe; Australia | 4:24.095 | Yehor Dementiev; Ukraine | 4:22.746 |
