= Cycling at the 2024 Summer Paralympics – Men's road race =

The men's road race cycling events at the 2024 Summer Paralympics took place from September 5 to 7 in Clichy-sous-Bois, Paris. Eight events took place, spanning over twelve classifications.

== Classification ==
Cyclists are given a classification depending on the type and extent of their disability. The classification system allows cyclists to compete against others with a similar level of function. The class number indicates the severity of impairment with "1" being most impaired.

Cycling classes are:

- B: Blind and visually impaired cyclists use a Tandem bicycle with a sighted pilot on the front
- H 1–4: Cyclists with an impairment that affects their legs use a handcycle
- T 1–2: Cyclists with an impairment that affects their balance use a tricycle
- C 1-5: Cyclists with an impairment that affects their legs, arms, and/or trunk but are capable of using a standard bicycle

== Schedule ==
F	Finals

Men's Road Race
Event↓/Date →	5 September	6 September	7 September
B		F	
H1-2	F		
H3	F		
H4	F		
H5	F		
C1-3			F
C4-5		F	
T1-2			F

== Medal table ==
* Host nation (France)

Rank	NPC	Gold	Silver	Bronze	Total
1	Netherlands	3	1	1	5
2	France*	2	4	2	8
3	Ukraine	1	0	1	2
4	China	1	0	0	1
4	Great Britain	1	0	0	1
6	Austria	0	1	0	1
6	Spain	0	1	0	1
6	United States	0	1	0	1
9	Italy	0	0	2	2
10	Colombia	0	0	1	1
10	Poland	0	0	1	1
Totals (11 entries)		8	8	8	24

== Medal summary ==
Classification	Gold		Silver		Bronze	
Road races
B	Tristan Bangma; Pilot: Patrick Bos; Netherlands	2:55:10	Vincent ter Schure; Pilot: Timo Fransen; Netherlands	2:55:12	Alexandre Lloveras; Pilot: Yoann Paillot; France	2:55:18
H1-2	Florian Jouanny; France	1:20:18	Sergio Garrote Munoz; Spain	1:20:40	Luca Mazzone; Italy	1:27:58
H3	Mathieu Bosredon; France	1:34:36	Johan Quaile; France	1:35:57	Mirko Testa; Italy	1:39:38
H4	Jetze Plat; Netherlands	1:29:15	Thomas Fruehwirth; Austria	1:29:46	Rafal Wilk; Poland	1:34:50
H5	Mitch Valize; Netherlands	1:33:12	Loïc Vergnaud; France	1:34:27	Pavlo Bal; Ukraine	1:37:03
C1-3	Finlay Graham; Great Britain	1:43:19	Thomas Peyroton-Dartet; France	1:43:19	Alexandre Leaute; France	1:43:43
C4-5	Yehor Dementyev; Ukraine	2:18:59	Kévin Le Cunff; France	2:18:59	Martin van de Pol; Netherlands	2:18:59
T1-2	Chen Jianxin; China	1:15:08	Dennis Connors; United States	1:17:09	Juan José Betancourt Quiroga; Colombia	1:17:09
