= Cycling at the 2024 Summer Paralympics – Men's road time trial B =

Men's road time trial B at the XVII Paralympic Games
- Venue: Clichy-sous-Bois
- Dates: 4 September
- Competitors: 24 from 8 nations
- Teams: 12
- Winning time: 34:11.02

Medalists
1st place, gold medalist(s)		Tristan Bangma; Pilot: Patrick Bos	Netherlands
2nd place, silver medalist(s)		Elie de Carvalho; Pilot: Mickaël Guichard	France
3rd place, bronze medalist(s)		Vincent ter Schure; Pilot: Timo Fransen	Netherlands

The Men's time trial B road cycling event at the 2024 Summer Paralympics took place on 4 September 2024 at Clichy-sous-Bois, Paris. Eleven riders (and pilots) competed in the event.

The B classification is for cyclists with visual impairment. Sighted guides act as pilots in these events, which take place on tandem bikes.

== Results ==
Rank	Rider	Nationality	Time	Deficit
1st place, gold medalist(s)	Tristan Bangma piloted by Patrick Bos	Netherlands	34:11.02	
2nd place, silver medalist(s)	Elie de Carvalho piloted by Mickaël Guichard	France	34:23.73	+00:12.71
3rd place, bronze medalist(s)	Vincent ter Schure piloted by Timo Fransen	Netherlands	34:53.92	+00:42.90
4	Alexandre Lloveras piloted by Yoann Paillot	France	34:55.32	+00:44.30
5	Stephen Bate piloted by Christopher Latham	Great Britain	35:17.10	+01:06.08
6	Federico Andreoli piloted by Paolo Totò	Italy	35:36.79	+01:25.77
7	Damien Vereker piloted by Mitchell McLaughlin	Ireland	36:31.09	+02:20.07
8	Karol Kopicz piloted by Marcin Bialoblocki	Poland	36:46.64	+02:35.62
9	Lorenzo Bernard piloted by Davide Plebani	Italy	36:58.15	+02:47.13
10	Maximiliano Gomez piloted by Sebastián José Tolosa	Argentina	40:12.22	+06:01.20
11	Kennedy Ogada piloted by Oscar James Hawke Dennis	Kenya	47:06.47	+12:55.45
