= Cycling at the 2020 Summer Paralympics – Men's road race B =

Men's road race B at the XVI Paralympic Games
- Venue: Fuji Speedway
- Dates: 3 September 2021
- Competitors: 10 from 8 nations
- Winning time: 2:59:13

Medalists
1st place, gold medalist(s)		Vincent ter Schure; Guide: Timo Fransen	Netherlands
2nd place, silver medalist(s)		Tristan Bangma; Guide: Patrick Bos	Netherlands
3rd place, bronze medalist(s)		Alexandre Lloveras; Guide: Corentin Ermenault	France

The men's road race B cycling event at the 2020 Summer Paralympics took place on 3 September 2021 at Fuji Speedway in Shizuoka Prefecture. 10 riders (and pilots) competed in the event.

The B classification is for cyclists with visual impairment. Sighted guides act as pilots in these events, which take place on tandem bikes.

== Results ==
The event took place on 3 September 2021 at 13:18.

Rank	Rider	Nationality	Time	Deficit
1st place, gold medalist(s)	Vincent ter Schure; Guide: Timo Fransen	Netherlands	2:59:13	
2nd place, silver medalist(s)	Tristan Bangma; Guide: Patrick Bos	Netherlands	3:05:01	+5:48
3rd place, bronze medalist(s)	Alexandre Lloveras; Guide: Corentin Ermenault	France	3:06:14	+7:01
4	Christian Venge Balboa; Guide: Noel Martín Infante	Spain	3:07:25	+8:12
5	Adolfo Bellido Guerrero; Guide: Eloy Teruel	Spain	3:09:03	+9:50
6	Maximiliano Gómez; Guide: Sebastián José Tolosa	Argentina	-1 LAP	
7	Milan Petrovic; Guide: Goran Šmelcerović	Serbia	-1 LAP	
8	Robert Ocelka; Guide: Gergely Nagy	Hungary	-1 LAP	
	Martin Gordon; Guide: Éamonn Byrne	Ireland	DNS	
	Stephen Bate; Guide: Adam Duggleby	Great Britain	DNS	
