= Cycling at the 2016 Summer Paralympics – Men's individual pursuit B =

Cycling, Men's Ind. Pursuit B at the XV Paralympic Games
- Venue: Rio Olympic Velodrome
- Dates: September 8, 2016
- Competitors: 16 from 11 nations

Medalists
1st place, gold medalist(s)		Steve Bate pilot : Adam Duggleby	Great Britain
2nd place, silver medalist(s)		Vincent Ter Schure pilot : Timo Fransen	Netherlands
3rd place, bronze medalist(s)		Stephen De Vries pilot : Patrick Bos	Netherlands

The Men's Individual Pursuit B track cycling event at the 2016 Summer Paralympics took place on September 8. This class is for blind and visually impaired cyclists riding with a sighted pilot. Sixteen pairs from 11 different nations compete.

The competition will begin with eight head to head races between the 16 riders. These races were held over a 4000m course and each rider is given a time for their race. The fastest two riders are advanced to the gold medal final whilst the third and fourth fastest times race it out for the bronze. The medal finals are held on the same day as the heats.

== Records ==
World record	Matt Formston (pilot: Michael Curran (AUS)	4:11.213	Aguascalientes, Mexico	10 April 2014
Paralympic record	Kieran Modra (pilot: Scott Mcphee) (AUS)	4:17.756	London, Great Britain	30 August 2012

== Preliminaries ==
Q = Qualifier for gold final Qb = Qualifier for bronze final PR = Paralympic Record WR = World Record

Rank	Name	Country	Time	Avg. Speed	Notes
1	Steve Bate pilot : Adam Duggleby	Great Britain	4:08.146	58.03	WR Q
2	Vincent Ter Schure pilot : Timo Fransen	Netherlands	4:09.527	57.709	Q
3	Ignacio Avila Rodriguez pilot : Joan Font Bertoli	Spain	4:13.536	56.796	Qb
4	Stephen de Vries pilot : Patrick Bos	Netherlands	4:14.018	56.688	Qb
5	Matt Formston pilot : Nicholas Yallouris	Australia	4:14.258	56.635	
6	Kieran Modra pilot : David Edwards	Australia	4:14.339	56.617	
7	Carlos Gonzalez Garcia pilot : Noel Martin Infante	Spain	4:19.752	55.437	
8	Damien Vereker pilot : Sean Hahessy	Ireland	4:20.139	55.355	
9	Daniel Chalifour pilot : Jean-Michel Lachance	Canada	4:24.129	54.518	
10	Przemyslaw Wegner pilot : Artur Korc	Poland	4:26.972	53.938	
11	Marcin Polak pilot : Michał Ładosz	Poland	4:27.997	53.731	
12	Raul Villalba pilot : Ezequiel Romero	Argentina	4:43.986	50.706	
13	Kai-Christian Kruse pilot : Stefan Nimke	Germany	4:45.603	50.419	
14	Muhammad Rizan pilot : Mohd Faizal Mohamed Noh	Malaysia	4:51.906	49.33	
15	Arnold Csaba Butu pilot : Laszlo Garamszegi	Hungary	5:00.716	47.885	
16	Athanasios Barakas pilot : Konstantinos Troulinos	Greece	5:03.979	47.371	

== Finals ==
Gold medal match

Name	Time	Rank
Stephen Bate (Pilot : Adam Duggleby) (GBR)	4:08.631	1st place, gold medalist(s)
Vincent Ter Schure (Pilot : Timo Fransen) (NED)	4:10.294	2nd place, silver medalist(s)

Bronze medal match

Name	Time	Rank
Stephen De Vries (Pilot : Patrick Bos) (NED)	4:15.769	3rd place, bronze medalist(s)
Ignacio Avila Rodriguez (Pilot : Joan Font Bertoli) (ESP)	4:16.674	4
