= Cycling at the 2016 Summer Paralympics – Men's 1 km time trial B =

Cycling, Men's 1 km Time Trial B at the XV Paralympic Games
- Dates: September 11, 2016
- Competitors: 12 from 10 nations
- Winning time: 59.822 (PR)

Medalists
1st place, gold medalist(s)		Tristan Bangma (Pilot: Teun Mulder)	Netherlands
2nd place, silver medalist(s)		Neil Fachie (Pilot: Pete Mitchell)	Great Britain
3rd place, bronze medalist(s)		Kai-Christian Kruse (Pilot: Stefan Nimke)	Germany

The Men's 1 km Time Trial B track cycling event at the 2016 Summer Paralympics took place on September 11. This class was for blind and visually impaired cyclists riding with a sighted pilot. Twelve pairs from 10 different nations competed.

== Results ==
Rank	Athlete	Nation	Time
1st place, gold medalist(s)	Tristan Bangma (Pilot: Teun Mulder)	Netherlands	59.822 (PR)
2nd place, silver medalist(s)	Neil Fachie (Pilot: Pete Mitchell)	Great Britain	1:00.241
3rd place, bronze medalist(s)	Kai-Christian Kruse (Pilot: Stefan Nimke)	Germany	1:01.787
4	Stephen de Vries (Pilot: Patrick Bos)	Netherlands	1:01.969
5	James Ball (Pilot: Craig MacLean)	Great Britain	1:02.316
6	Matt Formston (Pilot: Nicholas Yallouris)	Australia	1:02.546
7	Ignacio Avila Rodriguez (Pilot: Joan Font Bertoli)	Spain	1:03.533
8	Damien Vereker (Pilot: Sean Hahessy)	Ireland	1:06.370
9	Raul Villalba (Pilot: Ezequiel Romero)	Argentina	1:06.863
10	Athanasios Barakas (Pilot: Konstantinos Troulinos)	Greece	1:07.479
11	Arnold Csaba Butu (Pilot: Laszlo Garamszegi)	Hungary	1:12.674
	Muhammas Afiq Afify Rizan (Pilot: Mohd Faizal Mohammed Noh)	Malaysia	Did not start
