= Paralympic record progression track cycling – Men's 4000m pursuit =

This is an overview of the progression of the Paralympic track cycling record of the men's 4000m pursuitl as recognised by the Union Cycliste Internationale (UCI) and IPC.

== C5 Progression ==
Time	Cyclists	Class	Location	Track	Date	Competition	Ref
4:30.012	Michael Gallagher (AUS)	C5	London (GBR)	Indoor track	1 September 2012	2012 Paralympics	

== C4 Progression ==
Time	Cyclists	Class	Location	Track	Date	Competition	Ref
4:40.315	Carol-Eduard Novak (ROU)	C4	London (GBR)	Indoor track	1 September 2012	2012 Paralympics	
4:29.112	Josef Metelka (SVK)	C4	Rio (BRA)	Indoor track	10 September 2016	2016 Paralympics	

== B Progression ==
Time	Cyclists	Class	Location	Track	Date	Competition	Ref
4:26.498	Jan Mulder (NED); Jeron Straathof (NED)	B	Sydney (AUS)	Indoor track	19 October 2000	2000 Paralympics	
4:21.451	Kieran Modra (AUS); Roberts Crowe (AUS)	B	Athens (GRE)	Indoor track	19 September 2004	2004 Paralympics	
4:17.756	Neil Fachie (GBR); Barney Storey (GBR)	B	London (GBR)	Indoor track	30 August 2012	2012 Paralympics	
4:08.146	Steve Bate (GBR); Adam Duggleby (GBR)	B	Rio de Janeiro (BRA)	Indoor track	8 September 2016	2016 Paralympics	
3:59.470 WR	Tristan Bangma (NED); Patrick Bos (NED)	B	Tokyo (JPN)	Indoor track	22 August 2021	2020 Paralympics	
