= Cycling at the 2024 Summer Paralympics – Men's pursuit B =

Men's individual pursuit B at the XVII Paralympic Games
- Venue: Vélodrome National
- Dates: 29 August 2024
- Competitors: 32 from 12 nations
- Teams: 16
- Winning time: 3:55.439

Medalists
1st place, gold medalist(s)		Tristan Bangma; Pilot: Patrick Bos	Netherlands
2nd place, silver medalist(s)		Stephen Bate; Pilot: Christopher Latham	Great Britain
3rd place, bronze medalist(s)		Lorenzo Bernard; Pilot: Davide Plebani	Italy

The men's individual pursuit class B track cycling event at the 2024 Summer Paralympics took place on 29 August 2024 at the Vélodrome National. This class is for the cyclist who is blind or has visual impairments, thus they ride tandem bicycles with a sighted cyclist (also known as the pilot). There will be 16 pairs (32 competitors athlete+pilots) from 12 different nations competing.

== Competition format ==
The competition starts with a qualifying round where a time trial basis will be between the 16 pairs; all 16 pairs will be divided into 8 heats, all heats having 2 pairs. The 2 fastest pairs in the qualifying would qualify to the gold medal final while the 3rd and 4th fastest will qualify to the bronze medal final where they will race head-to-head. The distance of this event is 3000m. The medal finals are also held on the same day as the qualifying.

== Schedule ==
All times are Central European Summer Time (UTC+2)

Date	Time	Round
29 August	13:41	Qualifying
29 August	16:59	Finals

== Results ==
=== Qualifying ===
Rank	Heat	Cyclist	Nationality	Result	Notes
1	8	Tristan Bangma; Pilot: Patrick Bos	Netherlands	3:55.396	QG, WR
2	7	Stephen Bate; Pilot: Christopher Latham	Great Britain	3:56.435	QG
3	8	Lorenzo Bernard; Pilot: Davide Plebani	Italy	4:02.558	QB
4	7	Vincent ter Schure; Pilot: Timo Fransen	Netherlands	4:04.969	QB
5	6	Alexandre Lloveras; Pilot: Yoann Paillot	France	4:06.920	
6	5	Branden Walton; Pilot: Spencer Seggebruch	United States	4:10.290	
7	6	Damien Vereker; Pilot: Mitchell McLaughlin	Ireland	4:14.817	
8	5	Karol Kopicz; Pilot: Marcin Białobłocki	Poland	4:19.202	
9	3	Maximiliano Gómez; Pilot: Sebastián Tolosa	Argentina	4:28.087	
10	3	Kazuhei Kimura; Pilot: Kiaki Miura	Japan	4:28.676	
11	4	Thomas Ulbricht; Pilot: Robert Förstemann	Germany	5:21.994	
12	2	Martin Gordon; Pilot: Eoin Mullen	Ireland	5:27.642	
13	2	Neil Fachie; Pilot: Matt Rotherham	Great Britain	5:33.212	
14	1	Kane Perris; Pilot: Luke Zaccaria	Australia	5:42.837	
15	4	James Ball; Pilot: Steffan Lloyd	Great Britain	6:17.368	
16	1	Frederick Assor; Pilot: Rudolf Mensah	Ghana	6:30.071	

=== Finals ===
Rank	Cyclists	Nation	Result	Notes
Gold medal final
1st place, gold medalist(s)	Tristan Bangma; Pilot: Patrick Bos	Netherlands	3:55.439	
2nd place, silver medalist(s)	Stephen Bate; Pilot: Christopher Latham	Great Britain	3:57.652	
Bronze medal final
3rd place, bronze medalist(s)	Lorenzo Bernard; Pilot: Davide Plebani	Italy	4:04.613	
4	Vincent ter Schure; Pilot: Timo Fransen	Netherlands	4:08.267	
