= Cycling at the 2020 Summer Paralympics – Men's road time trial B =

Men's road time trial B at the XVI Paralympic Games
- Venue: Fuji Speedway
- Dates: 31 August
- Competitors: 11 from 8 nations
- Winning time: 41:54.02

Medalists
| 1st place, gold medalist(s) | | Alexandre Lloveras; Guide: Corentin Ermenault | France |
| 2nd place, silver medalist(s) | | Vincent ter Schure; Guide: Timo Fransen | Netherlands |
| 3rd place, bronze medalist(s) | | Christian Venge Balboa; Guide: Noel Martín Infante | Spain |

The men's time trial B road cycling event at the 2020 Summer Paralympics took place on 31 August 2021, at the Fuji Speedway in Tokyo. 11 riders (and pilots) competed in the event.

The B classification is for cyclists with visual impairment. Sighted guides act as pilots in these events, which take place on tandem bikes.

== Results ==
The event took place on 31 August 2021, at 13:30:

| Rank | Rider Guide | Nationality | Time | Deficit |
|---|---|---|---|---|
| 1st place, gold medalist(s) | Alexandre Lloveras; Guide: Corentin Ermenault | France | 41:54.02 | |
| 2nd place, silver medalist(s) | Vincent ter Schure; Guide: Timo Fransen | Netherlands | 42:00.77 | +6.75 |
| 3rd place, bronze medalist(s) | Christian Venge Balboa; Guide: Noel Martín Infante | Spain | 42:52.12 | +58.10 |
| 4 | Adolfo Bellido Guerrero; Guide: Eloy Teruel | Spain | 43:12.76 | +1:18.74 |
| 5 | Maximiliano Gomez; Guide: Sebastián José Tolosa | Argentina | 46:59.35 | +5:05.33 |
| 6 | Tristan Bangma; Guide: Patrick Bos | Netherlands | 47:20.91 | +5:26.89 |
| 7 | Milan Petrovic; Guide: Goran Šmelcerović | Serbia | 49:45.02 | +7:51.00 |
| 8 | Robert Ocelka; Guide: Gergely Nagy | Hungary | 1:00:54.97 | +19:00.95 |
| 9 | Raphael Beaugillet; Guide: François Pervis | France | 1:01:23.32 | +19:29.30 |
| | Stephen Bate; Guide: Adam Duggleby | Great Britain | DNF | |
| | Wee Leong Tee; Guide: Kee Meng Ang | Singapore | DNF | |
