= Cycling at the 2020 Summer Paralympics – Men's individual pursuit B =

Men's individual pursuit B at the XVI Paralympic Games
- Venue: Izu Velodrome
- Dates: 25 August 2021
- Competitors: 28 from 10 nations
- Teams: 14

Medalists
1st place, gold medalist(s)		Tristan Bangma piloted by Patrick Bos	Netherlands
2nd place, silver medalist(s)		Stephen Bate piloted by Adam Duggleby	Great Britain
3rd place, bronze medalist(s)		Alexandre Lloveras piloted by Corentin Ermenault	France

The men's individual pursuit class B track cycling event at the 2020 Summer Paralympics will be taking place on 25 August 2021 at the Izu Velodrome, Japan. This class is for the cyclist who is blind or has visual impairments, thus they ride tandem bicycles with a sighted cyclist (also known as the pilot). There will be 14 pairs from 10 different nations competing

== Competition format ==
The competition starts with a qualifying round where it comprises a head-to-head race between the 14 pairs; all 14 pairs will be divided into 7 heats (so 1 heat will consist of 2 pairs). The 2 fastest pairs in the qualifying would qualify to the gold medal final while the 3rd and 4th fastest will qualify to the bronze medal final where they will race head-to-head. The distance of this event is 4000m. The medal finals are also held on the same day as the qualifying.

== Schedule ==
All times are Japan Standard Time (UTC+9)

Date	Time	Round
25 August	11:52	Qualifying
25 August	14:50	Finals

== Records ==
World Record	Marcin Polak (pilot: Michał Ładosz) (POL)	4:03.528	Milton, Canada	31 January 2020
Paralympic Record	Stephen Bate (pilot: Adam Duggleby) (GBR)	4:08.146	Rio de Janeiro, Brazil	8 September 2016

== Results ==
=== Qualifying ===
Rank	Heat	Nation	Cyclists	Result	Notes
1	6	Netherlands	Tristan Bangma piloted by Patrick Bos	3:59.470	QG, WR
2	7	Great Britain	Stephen Bate piloted by Adam Duggleby	4:02.497	QG
3	6	Poland	Marcin Polak piloted by Michał Ładosz	4:05.042	QB
4	5	France	Alexandre Lloveras piloted by Corentin Ermenault	4:05.263	QB
5	7	Netherlands	Vincent ter Schure piloted by Timo Fransen	4:06.004	
6	5	Spain	Adolfo Bellido Guerrero piloted by Eloy Teruel Rovira	4:13.238	
7	4	Spain	Christian Venge Balboa piloted by Noel Martín Infante	4:15.494	
8	4	Argentina	Maximiliano Ramon Gomez piloted by Sebastián José Tolosa	4:27.874	
9	3	Singapore	Tee Wee Leong piloted by Ang Kee Meng	4:40.453	
10	3	Hungary	Róbert Ocelka piloted by Gergely Nagy	4:42.401	
11	2	Great Britain	Neil Fachie piloted by Matt Rotherham	4:42.630	
12	2	Ghana	Frederick Assor piloted by Rudolf Mensah	6:28.302	
	1	Great Britain	James Ball piloted by Lewis Stewart	DNF	
	1	Germany	Kai Kruse piloted by Robert Förstemann	DNF	

=== Finals ===
Rank	Nation	Cyclists	Result	Notes
Gold medal final
1st place, gold medalist(s)	Netherlands	Tristan Bangma piloted by Patrick Bos		
2nd place, silver medalist(s)	Great Britain	Stephen Bate piloted by Adam Duggleby	OVL	
Bronze medal final
3rd place, bronze medalist(s)	France	Alexandre Lloveras piloted by Corentin Ermenault	4:08.126	
	Poland	Marcin Polak piloted by Michał Ładosz	4:07.850 (DSQ)*	

- Marcin Polak finished third, but was suspended and stripped of his bronze medal due to a failed doping test.
