= Cycling at the 2024 Summer Paralympics – Men's road race B =

Men's road race B at the XVII Paralympic Games
- Venue: Clichy-sous-Bois
- Dates: 6 September 2024
- Competitors: 11 from 8 nations
- Winning time: 2:55:10

Medalists
1st place, gold medalist(s)		Tristan Bangma; Pilot: Patrick Bos	Netherlands
2nd place, silver medalist(s)		Vincent ter Schure; Pilot: Timo Fransen	Netherlands
3rd place, bronze medalist(s)		Alexandre Lloveras; Pilot: Yoann Paillot	France

The men's road race B cycling event at the 2024 Summer Paralympics took place on 6 September 2024 in Clichy-sous-Bois in Seine-Saint-Denis, Paris, France

The B classification is for cyclists with visual impairment. Sighted guides act as pilots in these events, which take place on tandem bikes.

== Schedule ==
F	Finals

Men's Road Race
Event↓/Date →	5 September	6 September	7 September
B		F	
H1-2	F		
H3	F		
H4	F		
H5	F		
C1-3			F
C4-5		F	
T1-2			F

== Results ==
Rank	Rider	Nationality	Time	Gap	Notes
1st place, gold medalist(s)	Tristan Bangma; Pilot: Patrick Bos	Netherlands	2:55:10		
2nd place, silver medalist(s)	Vincent ter Schure; Pilot: Timo Fransen	Netherlands	2:55:12	+00:02	
3rd place, bronze medalist(s)	Alexandre Lloveras; Pilot: Yoann Paillot	France	2:55:18	+00:08	
4	Elie de Carvalho; Pilot: Mickaël Guichard	France	2:56:47	+01:37	
5	Lorenzo Bernard; Pilot: Davide Plebani	Italy	2:59:38	+04:28	
6	Federico Andreoli; Pilot: Paolo Totò	Italy	3:03:49	+08:39	
7	Karol Kopicz; Pilot: Marcin Bialoblocki	Poland	3:03:55	+08:45	
8	Damien Vereker; Pilot: Mitchell McLaughlin	Ireland	3:04:18	+09:08	
9	Maximiliano Gomez; Pilot: Sebastián José Tolosa	Argentina	-1 lap	–	
–	Kennedy Ogada; Pilot: Oscar James Hawke Dennis	Kenya	DNF	–	
DNS	Stephen Bate; Pilot: Christopher Latham	Great Britain	DNS		
