= 2016 UEC European Track Championships – Men's individual pursuit =

Men's individual pursuit at the 2016 UEC European Track Championships
- UEC European Champion jersey
- Venue: Vélodrome de Saint-Quentin-en-Yvelines, Yvelines
- Date: 22 October
- Competitors: 30 from 16 nations

Medalists
gold medal	Corentin Ermenault	France
silver medal	Filippo Ganna	Italy
bronze medal	Dion Beukeboom	Netherlands

The Men's individual pursuit was held on 22 October 2016.

== Results ==
=== Qualifying ===
The fastest 4 competitors qualify for the medal finals.

Rank	Name	Nation	Time	Notes
1	Filippo Ganna	Italy	4:17.298	QG
2	Corentin Ermenault	France	4:19.272	QG
3	Dion Beukeboom	Netherlands	4:20.298	QB
4	Daniel Staniszewski	Poland	4:20.585	QB
5	Ivo Oliveira	Portugal	4:20.629	
6	Leif Lampater	Germany	4:20.922	
7	Niklas Larsen	Denmark	4:22.421	
8	Szymon Sajnok	Poland	4:22.524	
9	Casper von Folsach	Denmark	4:22.643	
10	Sylvain Chavanel	France	4:23.350	
11	Liam Bertazzo	Italy	4:24.355	
12	Sergey Shilov	Russia	4:24.951	
13	Mark Stewart	Great Britain	4:25.057	
14	Mikhail Shemetau	Belarus	4:25.843	
15	Vicente García de Mateos	Spain	4:27.435	
16	Dmitry Sokolov	Russia	4:27.723	
17	Aleh Ahiyevich	Belarus	4:28.090	
18	Roy Eefting	Netherlands	4:29.297	
19	Jasper Frahm	Germany	4:29.837	
20	Nicolas Pietrula	Czech Republic	4:29.912	
21	Gino Mader	Switzerland	4:29.947	
22	Matthew Bostock	Great Britain	4:30.148	
23	Volodymyr Fredyuk	Ukraine	4:31.741	
24	Tristan Marguet	Switzerland	4:32.256	
25	Robbe Ghys	Belgium	4:32.292	
26	Illart Zuazubiskar	Spain	4:32.367	
27	Marc Potts	Ireland	4:33.877	
28	Lindsay De Vylder	Belgium	4:35.439	
29	Volodymyr Kogut	Ukraine	4:39.073	
30	Antonio Barbio	Portugal	4:44.025	

- QG = qualified for gold medal final
- QB = qualified for bronze medal final

=== Finals ===
The final classification is determined in the medal finals.

Rank	Name	Nation	Time	Notes
Bronze medal final
3rd place, bronze medalist(s)	Dion Beukeboom	Netherlands	4:20.568	
4	Daniel Staniszewski	Poland	4:21.905	
Gold medal final
1st place, gold medalist(s)	Corentin Ermenault	France	4:18.778	
2nd place, silver medalist(s)	Filippo Ganna	Italy	4:19.084	
