= Elie de Carvalho =

French cyclist (born 1994)

Personal information
- Born: 5 December 1994 (age 31) Millau, France

Cycling career
- Sport: Cycling
- Discipline: Road
- Role: Rider
Medal record
Representing France
Paralympic Games
Silver medal – second place	2024 Paris	Time trial
Road World Championships
Gold medal – first place	2025 Ronse	Time trial B
Bronze medal – third place	2025 Ronse	Road race B

Elie de Carvalho (born 5 December 1994) is a French cyclist who competes in the B2 category.

== Biography ==
An individual amateur rider in DN1, de Carvalho took part in several classics; he fell heavily during the Tour du Beaujolais and suffered a head trauma. In 2018, he learned that he had Leber's optic neuropathy, a rare genetic disease that manifests itself by a sudden drop in vision.

A student in Limoges at a physiotherapy school, de Carvalho resumed competitive level in tandem road cycling at the Colomiers club with Thomas Arvis as his pilot. In 2021, he won the title of French para-sports champion ahead of Alexandre Lloveras, gold medalist in the time trial at the Games. At the 2023 World Championships in Glasgow, de Carvalho won two bronze medals with Mickaël Guichard in the time trial and road race.

At the 2024 Summer Paralympics, the duo won the silver medal in the time trial, beaten by two seconds by the Dutch duo of Tristan Bangma and his pilot Patrick Bos.
