= Christopher Latham =

British cyclist

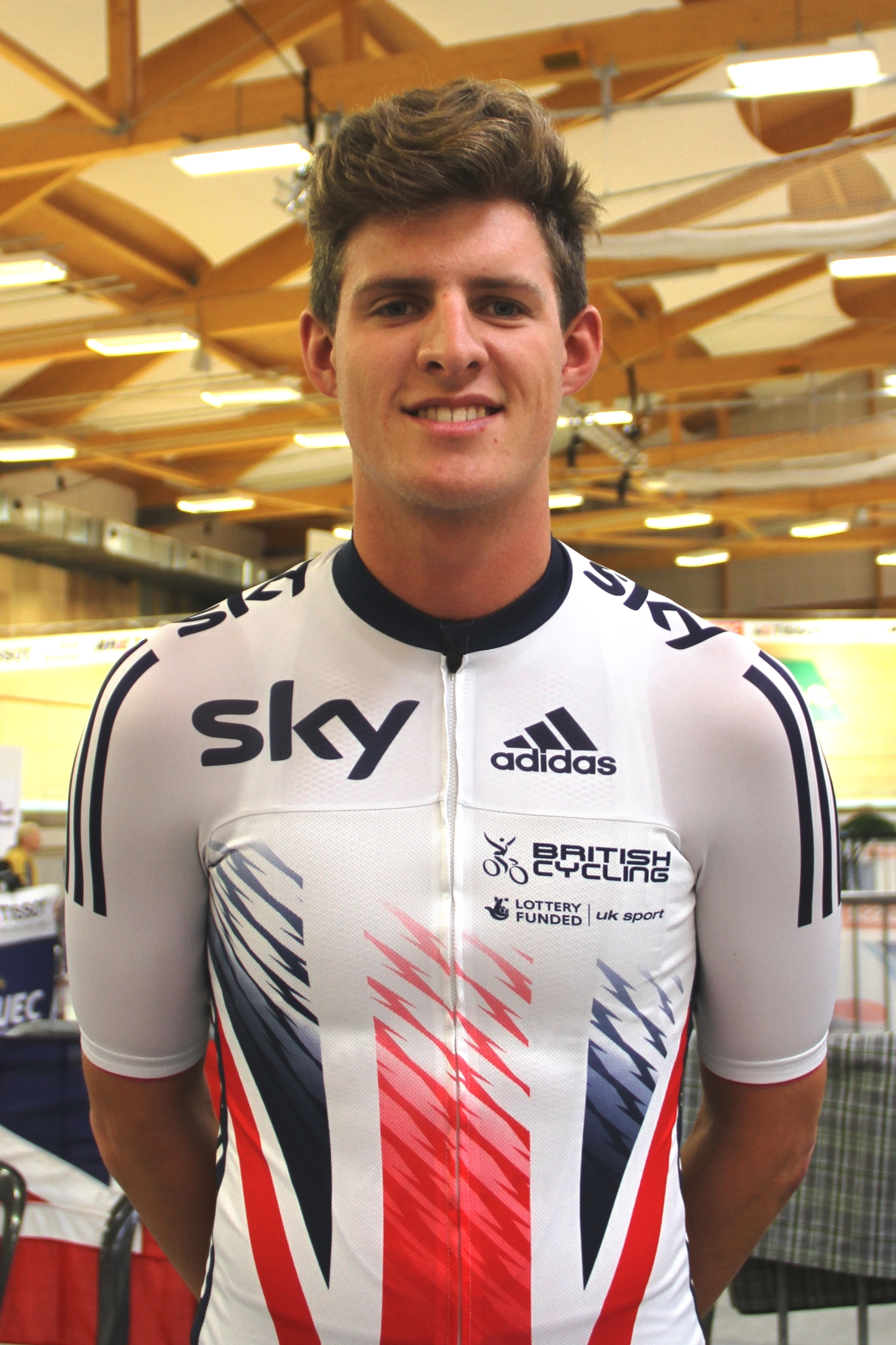
- Latham at the 2015 UEC European Track Championships

Personal information
- Full name: Christopher Jack Latham
- Born: 6 February 1994 (age 32) Bolton, Greater Manchester, England

Cycling career
- Sport: Cycling
- Disciplines: Road; Track
- Role: Rider

Amateur teams
- 2013: Team Eurasia–IRC Tire
- 2014: 100% ME

Professional teams
- 2015–2017: WIGGINS
- 2018: ONE Pro Cycling
- 2019–2020: Vitus Pro Cycling Team p/b Brother UK
- 2021: SwiftCarbon Pro Cycling
Medal record
Men's track cycling
Representing Great Britain
World Championships
Bronze medal – third place	2017 Hong Kong	Scratch race
European Championships
Bronze medal – third place	2015 Grenchen	Elimination race
Representing England
Commonwealth Games
Bronze medal – third place	2018 Gold Coast	Scratch race
Mens para-cycling
Representing Great Britain
Paralympic Games
Silver medal – second place	2024 Paris	Individual pursuit B
Track World Championships
Gold medal – first place	2025 Rio de Janeiro	Individual pursuit B
Silver medal – second place	2026 Apeldoorn	Individual pursuit B

Christopher Jack Latham (born 6 February 1994) is an English cyclist from Bolton, who most recently rode for UCI Continental team SwiftCarbon Pro Cycling. In 2015 he won the bronze medal in the elimination race at the 2015 UEC European Track Championships in Grenchen, Switzerland.

== Career ==
He spent three seasons riding for the WIGGINS team before joining ONE Pro Cycling for 2018. Latham joined Vitus Pro Cycling Team p/b Brother UK for the 2019 season. He remained with the team until the end of the 2020 season, when he joined SwiftCarbon Pro Cycling for the 2021 season.

At the 2024 Summer Paralympics in Paris, France, Latham represented Great Britain as he competed as the sighted pilot for Stephen Bate in the men's pursuit B. The pair set a new world record in qualifying to reach the gold medal final. However, previous world record holders Tristan Bangma and Patrick Bos of the Netherlands retook the world record in their qualifying run and went on to beat Bate and Latham in the final, meaning the British pair won a silver medal.

At the 2025 UCI Para-cycling Track World Championships, Latham piloted Stephen Bate to gold in the men’s tandem (B) individual pursuit, the final world title of Bate’s career and a landmark win for the British tandem.

== Major results ==
=== Track ===
2011
2nd Kilo, National Junior Championships
2012
National Junior Championships

1st Individual pursuit
1st Points race
3rd Scratch

UEC European Junior Championships

2nd Scratch
2nd Team pursuit

2nd Team pursuit, National Championships
2013
2nd Omnium, National Championships
2014
National Championships

1st Team pursuit
3rd Scratch

2015
1st Team pursuit, UEC European Under-23 Championships
UCI World Cup

2nd Omnium, Cambridge
3rd Team pursuit, Cali

2nd Six Days of London (with Oliver Wood)
3rd Elimination race, UEC European Championships
National Championships

3rd Points race
3rd Scratch

2016
UCI World Cup

2nd Scratch, Apeldoorn
3rd Team pursuit, Hong Kong

2017
3rd Scratch, UCI World Championships
2018
3rd Scratch, Commonwealth Games

=== Road ===
2014
1st Spiere-Helkijn
2015
1st Beaumont Trophy
10th Overall Tour de Berlin
2016
1st Stage 5 Olympia's Tour
2nd Omloop Mandel-Leie-Schelde
3rd Grand Prix Pino Cerami
4th Antwerpse Havenpijl
7th Paris–Tours Espoirs
2017
1st East Cleveland–Klondike GP
4th Velothon Wales
