= Aaron Scheidies =

American paratriathlete and paracyclist

Personal information
- Nationality: American
- Born: January 17, 1982 (age 44)
- Education: Michigan State University

Sport
- Country: United States
- Sport: Paratriathlon, Paracycling
Medal record
Men's paratriathlon
Representing United States
World Championships
Gold medal – first place	2009 Gold Coast	TRI 6
Gold medal – first place	2014 Edmonton	PT5
Gold medal – first place	2015 Chicago	PT5
Gold medal – first place	2016 Rotterdam	PT5
Silver medal – second place	2013 London	TRI 6b
Silver medal – second place	2017 Rotterdam	PTVI
Silver medal – second place	2018 Gold Coast	PTVI
Bronze medal – third place	2019 Lausanne	PTVI
Americas Championships
Gold medal – first place	2014 Dallas	PT5
Gold medal – first place	2015 Monterrey	PT5
Gold medal – first place	2016 Sarasota	PT5
Gold medal – first place	2017 Sarasota	PTVI
Gold medal – first place	2018 Sarasota-Bradenton	PTVI
Gold medal – first place	2019 Sarasota-Bradenton	PTVI
Bronze medal – third place	2021 Pleasant Prairie	PTVI

Aaron Scheidies (born January 17, 1982) is an American male triathlete from Seattle, Washington. Despite dealing with a visual impairment for the entirety of his life, Aaron is a 13-time triathlon World Champion and an 11-time National Champion.

He competed for the United States at the 2016 Summer Paralympics, finishing 11th in the men's road race B event and 12th in the men's time trial B event.
