= Federico Andreoli =

Italian para-cyclist (born 1999)

Personal information
- Nationality: Italian
- Born: 22 April 1999 (age 27)

Sport
- Sport: Para-cycling
- Disability: Vision impairment
Medal record
Men's Para-cycling
Representing Italy
Road World Championships
Gold medal – first place	2025 Ronse	Road race B

Federico Andreoli (born 22 April 1999) is an Italian para-cyclist who competes in tandem events. He represented Italy at the 2024 Summer Paralympics.

== Career ==
Andreoli represented Italy at the 2024 Summer Paralympics with Paolo Totò as his pilot. The duo competed in the time trial and road race, where they finished in sixth place in both events. In August 2025, Andreoli represented his country at the 2025 UCI Para-cycling Road World Championships with Francesco Di Felice as his pilot. Along with Di Felice, he competed in the road race event, winning the gold medal in that event.
