= Jasper Frahm =

German cyclist (born 1996)

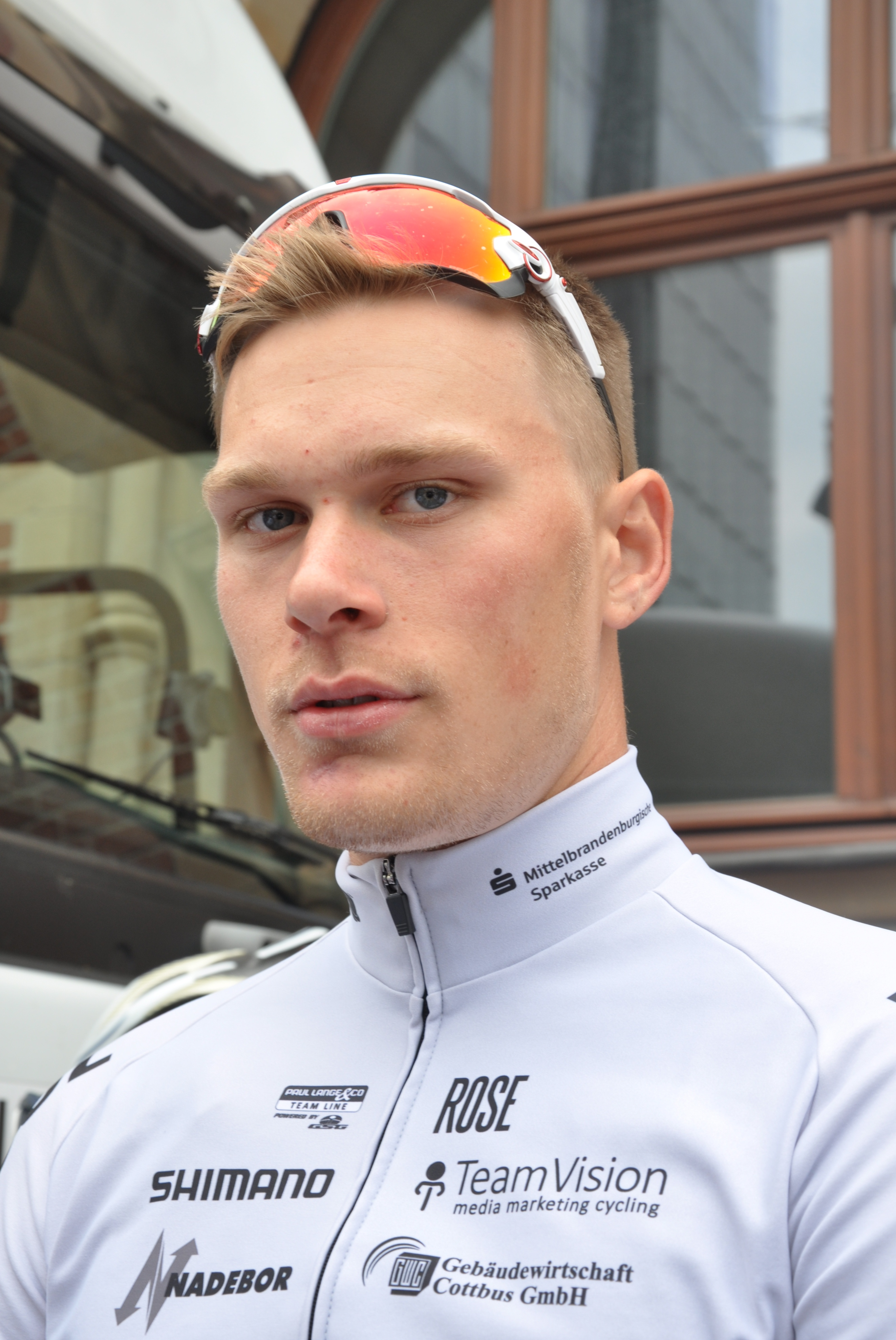
- Frahm in 2016

Personal information
- Full name: Jasper Frahm
- Born: 7 March 1996 (age 30)

Cycling career
- Sport: Cycling
- Current team: Berliner TSC
- Disciplines: Track; Road
- Role: Rider

Amateur teams
- 2008–2009: BSV Buxtehude
- 2010–2011: RG Hamburg
- 2012–2014: RSC Cottbus
- 2013–2014: Landesverband Brandenburg
- 2021–: Berliner TSC

Professional teams
- 2015–2016: LKT Team Brandenburg
- 2017–2020: Rad-Net Rose Team

Jasper Frahm (born 7 March 1996) is a German road and track cyclist, who currently rides for German amateur team Berliner TSC. Representing Germany at international competitions, Frahm competed at the 2016 UEC European Track Championships in the team pursuit.
