= Mickaël Guichard =

French para-cyclist (born 1993)

Personal information
- Born: 29 August 1993 (age 33) Ussel, Corrèze, France

Cycling career
- Sport: Cycling
- Current team: Team Atria–Montluçon Cyclisme
- Discipline: Road
- Role: Rider

Amateur teams
- 2015–2017: Océane Top 16
- 2020–2021: Pro Immo Nicolas Roux
- 2022–2024: WB–Fybolia Morbihan
- 2025–: Team Atria–Montluçon Cyclisme

Professional team
- 2019: Delko–Marseille Provence (stagiaire)
Medal record
Men's Para-cycling
Representing France
Paralympic Games
Silver medal – second place	2024 Paris	Road time trial B
Road World Championships
Gold medal – first place	2025 Ronse	Time trial B
Bronze medal – third place	2023 Glasgow	Time trial B
Bronze medal – third place	2023 Glasgow	Road race B
Bronze medal – third place	2025 Ronse	Road race B

Mickaël Guichard (born 29 August 1993) is a French cyclist who serves as a sighted pilot for blind cyclist Elie de Carvalho.

== Career ==
Guichard made his Road World Championships debut in 2023, where he served as the sighted pilot for Elie de Carvalho and won bronze medals in the time trial and road race B events. He then competed at the 2024 Summer Paralympics, where the duo won a silver medal in the road time trial B with a time 34:23.73. In August 2025, he represented France at the 2025 UCI Para-cycling Road World Championships and won a gold medal in the time trial B event with a time of 40:08.13, along with Carvalho.

== Major results ==
2014
9th Paris–Tours Espoirs
2015
8th Paris–Mantes-en-Yvelines
2016
1st Mountains classification, Kreiz Breizh Elites
3rd Paris–Mantes-en-Yvelines
2017
7th Paris–Mantes-en-Yvelines
2018
1st Stages 2a & 5 Tour de la Guadeloupe
2nd Grand Prix de la Ville de Nogent-sur-Oise
4th Paris–Mantes-en-Yvelines
2019
1st Bordeaux–Saintes
8th Overall Tour d'Eure-et-Loir

1st Sprints classification

2020
1st Grand Prix d'Issoire
2021
1st Grand Prix d'Issoire
1st Paris-Connerré
3rd Grand Prix de la Ville de Nogent-sur-Oise
10th Overall Tour de la Guadeloupe

1st Prologue & Stage 2

2022
1st Stage 1 Tour de Bretagne
2023
1st Circuit du Morbihan
2025
1st Bordeaux–Saintes
