= David Edwards (cyclist) =

Australian cyclist (born 1993)

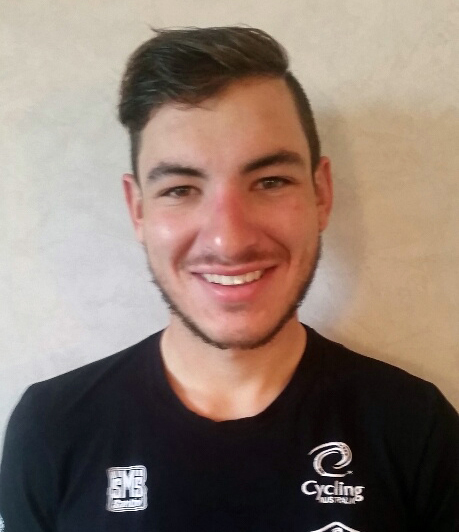
- 2016 Cycling Australia Portrait

Personal information
- Full name: David Edwards
- Nationality: Australian
- Born: 21 April 1993 (age 33) Alice Springs, Northern Territory

Sport
- Country: Australia
- Sport: Cycling
- Club: Tablelands Cycle Sports
- Coached by: Nick Formosa
Medal record
Men's cycling
Representing Australia
Paralympic Games
Bronze medal – third place	2016 Rio de Janeiro	Road time trial B
UCI Para-cycling Track World Championships
Gold medal – first place	2016 Montichiari	Men's Tandem 4 km Pursuit B

David Edwards (born 21 April 1993) is an Australian cyclist, who has found sporting success both individually and in tandem cycling. He piloted Kieran Modra in tandem cycling. He made his Paralympic debut at the 2016 Rio Paralympics.

== Personal ==
Edwards was born in Alice Springs, NT on 21 April 1993. He grew up in Townsville and Tolga, QLD and attended Atherton State High School. He is a graduate of Griffith University, having studied and completed a Bachelor of Psychological Science. Edwards currently cycles for Tablelands cycle sports and is coached by Nick Formosa. He also has two older sisters (Angela Brun and Emily Edwards) and two younger half brothers (Charlie and Jamie Edwards).

== Career ==
Edwards started competing in 2006 (aged 13) and first competed for Australia in 2010.

=== Individual ===
Edwards first competed (at an international level) in 2010 at Liege – La Gleize and Rothays Regio – Tour International and before gaining his first international podium finish during the 2011 U19 UCI World Cycling Championships in Copenhagen (3rd Place). He has since competed in Princess Maha Chakri Sirindhon's Cup Tour of Thailand (3rd place), Oceania Continental Championships (5th place) and won the 2015 U23 Oceania Continental Championship road race. In 2013, Edwards was invited to join the French cycling team (AG2R La Mondiale U23). He resided in Chambéry, France, during his time with AG2R.

=== Pilot ===
Serving as a sighted pilot for Kieran Modra, the pair won multiple events. These events include; the 2016 Australian para-cycling Tandem National Championships with a winning time of 4mins 17.929secs alongside Gold in the 2016 Para-Cycling Track World Championship in Tandem 4 km Pursuit with a time of 4min 12.324secs. The pair made their Paralympic debut at the 2016 Rio Paralympic Games. At the Games, they won a bronze medal in the Men's Road Time Trial B.

=== Charity work ===
In November 2016, Edwards embarked upon and completed a 10-day cycle from Brisbane to his childhood town of Atherton, a journey of 2000 km. He did this for the specific purpose of "raising awareness and funds around mental health and suicide prevention," and raised money from this for the charity Beyond Blue. During his journey up the Queensland coast, Edwards met up with and rode with several local cycling clubs.

== Major results ==
2011
1st Road race, National Junior Road Championships
3rd Time trial, UCI World Junior Championships
2012
3rd Overall Tour of Thailand
9th Time trial, Oceania Championships
2015
5th Road race, Oceania Championships
8th Time trial, Oceania Under-23 Championships
