= Corentin Ermenault =

French cyclist (born 1996)

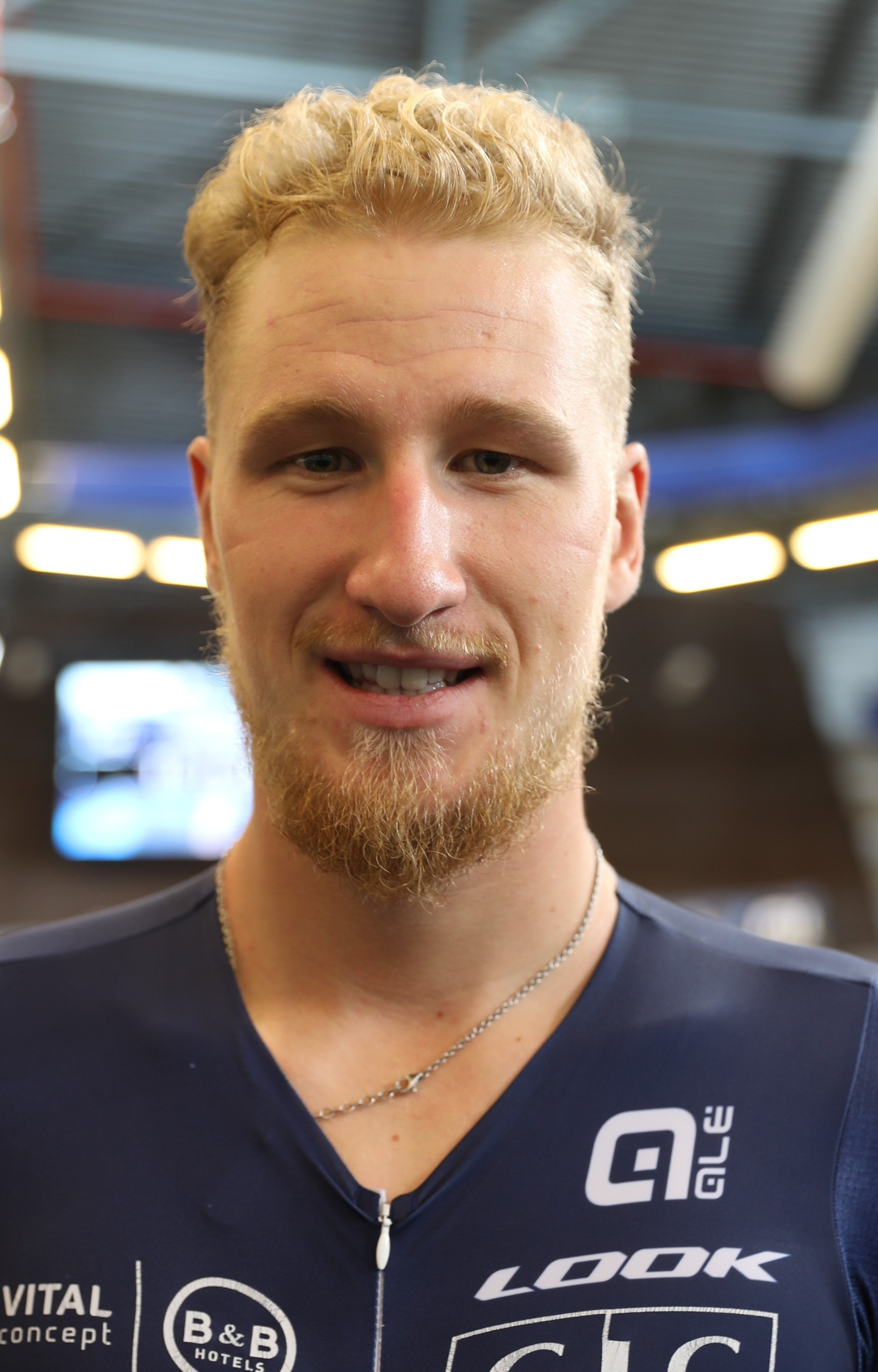
- Ermenault in 2019

Personal information
- Born: 27 January 1996 (age 30) Amiens, France
- Height: 1.88 m (6 ft 2 in)
- Weight: 75 kg (165 lb)

Cycling career
- Sport: Cycling
- Current team: Team Bricquebec Cotentin
- Disciplines: Track; Road
- Role: Rider
- Rider type: Rouleur

Amateur teams
- 2012: AC Amiènoise
- 2013: VC Amateur Saint-Quentin Junior
- 2014: CC Nogent-sur-Oise Junior
- 2015–2016: CC Nogent-sur-Oise
- 2020–2022: AVC Aix-en-Provence
- 2023–: Team Bricquebec Cotentin

Professional teams
- 2017: WIGGINS
- 2018–2019: Vital Concept
Medal record
Representing France
Men's track cycling
World Championships
Bronze medal – third place	2020 Berlin	Individual pursuit
European Championships
Gold medal – first place	2016 Yvelines	Individual Pursuit
Gold medal – first place	2016 Yvelines	Team pursuit
Gold medal – first place	2017 Berlin	Team pursuit
Gold medal – first place	2019 Apeldoorn	Individual pursuit
Bronze medal – third place	2023 Grenchen	Team pursuit
Men's road cycling
Summer Paralympics
Gold medal – first place	2020 Tokyo	Men's Road Time Trial B (pilot)
World Championships
Bronze medal – third place	2017 Bergen	Under-23 time trial
European Championships
Bronze medal – third place	2017 Herning	Under-23 time trial
Silver medal – second place	2019 Alkmaar	Under-23 time trial
Silver medal – second place	2014 Nyon	Junior time trial

Corentin Ermenault (born 27 January 1996) is a French road and track cyclist, who currently rides for French amateur team Team Bricquebec Cotentin. His father, Philippe Ermenault, was also a professional cyclist.

== Major results ==
=== Road ===
2013
4th Time trial, UEC European Junior Championships
7th Time trial, UCI World Junior Championships
2014
1st Time trial, National Junior Championships
2nd Time trial, UEC European Junior Championships
7th Paris–Roubaix Juniors
2016
National Under-23 Championships

2nd Time trial
3rd Road race

3rd Ronde van Vlaanderen Beloften
4th Time trial, UEC European Under-23 Championships
6th Overall ZLM Tour
7th Duo Normand (with Rémi Cavagna)
8th Paris–Troyes
2017
3rd Time trial, UCI World Under-23 Championships
3rd Time trial, UEC European Under-23 Championships
3rd Time trial, National Under-23 Championships
5th Paris–Tours Espoirs
2019
10th Grand Prix de la Somme
2021
1st Time trial B, Paralympic Games (Pilot for Alexandre Lloveras)
2022
1st Stage 1 Tour de la Mirabelle

=== Track ===
2013
UEC European Junior Championships

1st Madison (with Jordan Levasseur)
2nd Team pursuit
3rd Individual pursuit

National Junior Championships

1st Individual pursuit
3rd Team pursuit

2014
UEC European Junior Championships

1st Points race
2nd Individual pursuit

National Junior Championships

1st Individual pursuit
1st Madison (with Adrien Garel)
1st Team pursuit

2nd Team pursuit, National Championships
2015
National Championships

2nd Team pursuit
3rd Individual pursuit

3rd Individual pursuit, UEC European Under-23 Championships
2016
UEC European Championships

1st Individual pursuit
1st Team pursuit

1st Team pursuit, UEC European Under-23 Championships
National Championships

1st Team pursuit
2nd Individual pursuit
2nd Omnium
3rd Points race

2nd Team pursuit, UCI World Cup, Glasgow
2017
1st Team pursuit, UEC European Championships
National Championships

1st Team pursuit
2nd Individual pursuit

2018
National Championships

1st Individual pursuit
1st Madison (with Adrien Garel)
1st Team pursuit
2nd Scratch
3rd Omnium

2019
1st Individual pursuit, UEC European Championships
National Championships

1st Individual pursuit
1st Scratch
2nd Madison
2nd Points race
2nd Team pursuit

UCI World Cup

1st Team pursuit, Milton
2nd Team pursuit, Minsk
3rd Team pursuit, Glasgow

2020
3rd Individual pursuit, UCI World Championships
2021
1st Individual pursuit, National Championships
2022
UCI Nations Cup

1st Individual pursuit, Glasgow
1st Team pursuit, Glasgow

2023
3rd Team pursuit, UEC European Championships
