= Kai Kruse =

German cyclist and rower (born 1991)

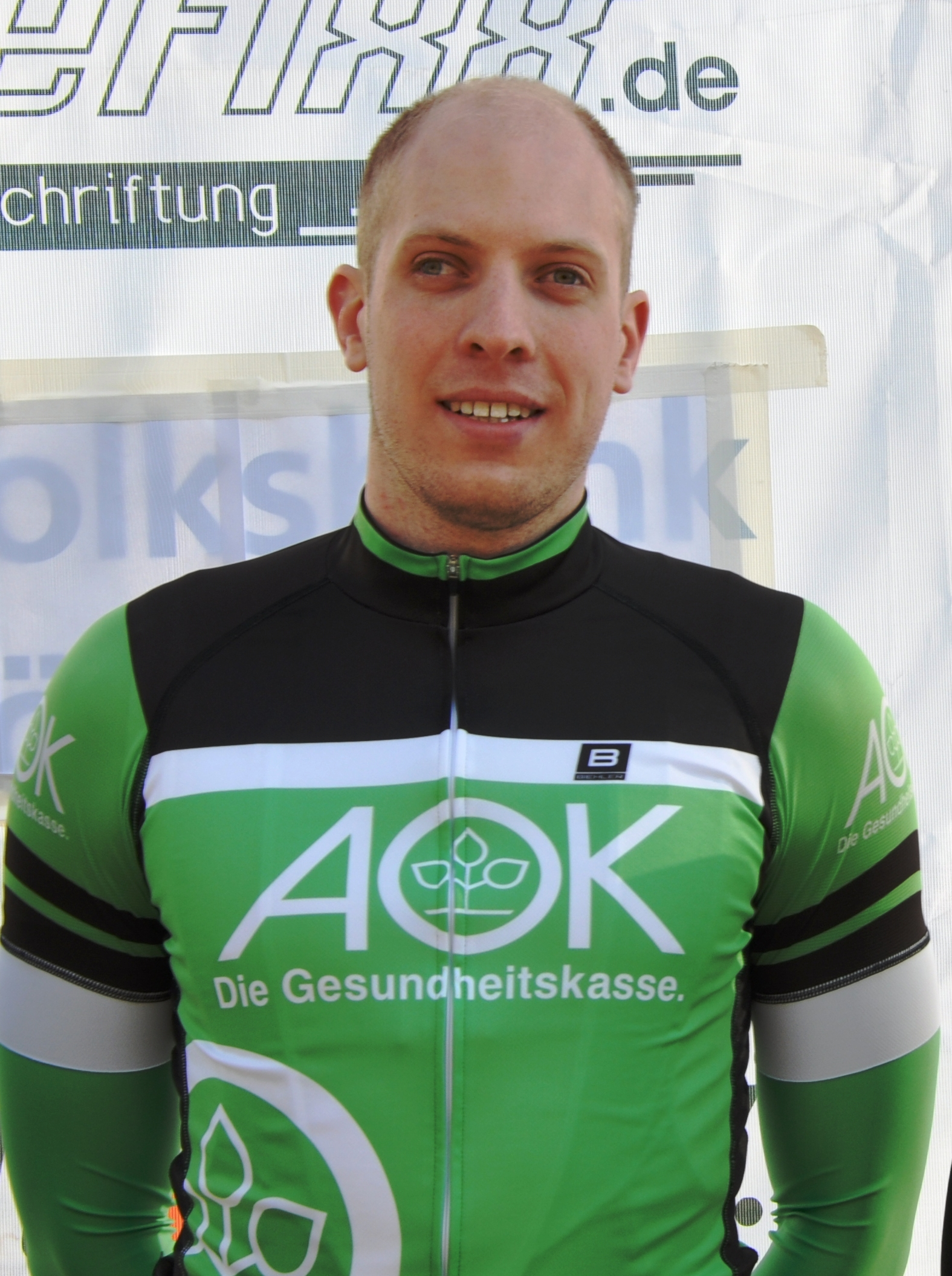
- Kruse in 2016

Personal information
- Full name: Kai-Christian Kruse
- Nationality: German
- Born: 19 August 1991 (age 35) Hamburg, Germany

Sport
- Sport: Para-cycling; Pararowing
- Retired: 2021
Medal record
Representing Germany
Men's Para-cycling
Summer Paralympics
Bronze medal – third place	2016 Rio de Janeiro	Tandem B kilo
Track World Championships
Bronze medal – third place	2015 Apeldoorn	Tandem B kilo
Bronze medal – third place	2020 Milton	Tandem B kilo
Men's Pararowing
Summer Paralympics
Silver medal – second place	2012 London	Mixed coxed four

Kai-Christian Kruse (born 19 August 1991) is a German former cyclist and rower. As a rower, he competed at the 2012 Summer Paralympics, winning a silver medal. As a cyclist, he competed in track cycling at the 2016 and 2020 Summer Paralympics, winning a bronze medal in the former.

== Early life ==
At the age of three, Kruse collided with another child while running in the hall and suffered a severe concussion. The optic nerve was damaged so badly that he lost part of his vision.

== Sporting career ==
Kruse began rowing in 2001 and started for the Hamburg rowing club Favorite Hammonia. With the club eight, he took part in the rowing national league, among other events. From 2010, he concentrated on para-rowing, and the following year he was nominated as a substitute for the World Championships for the first time. In the 2012 Paralympic season, he moved up to the German LTA mixed four for the Paralympics in London due to an injury to another athlete and won the silver medal there with Katrin Splitt, Astrid Hengsbach, Tino Kolitscher and Anke Molkenthin. For this success, he was awarded the Silbernes Lorbeerblatt, the highest sporting award in Germany, by Federal President Joachim Gauck on 7 November 2012.

At the initiative of the National Paralympic Committee Germany, Kruse began preparing in 2013 for the 1000-metre time trial at the 2016 Summer Paralympics in Rio de Janeiro together with multiple cycling world champion and Olympic gold medalist Stefan Nimke as a pilot on the tandem. At the 2014 UCI Para-cycling Track World Championships, both finished in fifth place in this discipline, and in 2015 the duo won the bronze medal at the World Championships in Apeldoorn. The following year, at the 2016 UCI Para-cycling Track World Championships in Montichiari, Italy, Kruse and Nimke achieved a new personal best of 1:02.449 minutes and finished in fourth place. In 2016, Kruse competed with Nimke as a pilot at the Paralympics in Rio de Janeiro. They finished 13th in the pursuit and won the bronze medal in the 1000 metre time trial. This makes Nimke the first German athlete to win medals at both the Olympic and Paralympic Games.

In 2019, Kruse competed with his new pilot Robert Förstemann in the Para-cycling Track World Championships in Apeldoorn. At the 2020 Track World Championships in Milton, Ontario, Canada, the two riders won bronze in the time trial. In 2021, Kruse was nominated with Förstemann as his pilot to take part in the 2020 Summer Paralympics in Tokyo. There, the two riders finished fourth in the time trial, missing the bronze medal by 0.082 seconds. Kruse ended his cycling career at the end of 2021.
