= Vincent ter Schure =

Dutch Paralympic cyclist

Personal information
- Born: 24 October 1979 (age 46) Amersfoort, Netherlands

Sport
- Country: Netherlands
- Sport: Para-cycling
- Disability: Vision impairment
Medal record
Paralympic Games
Gold medal – first place	2016 Rio de Janeiro	Road race B
Gold medal – first place	2020 Tokyo	Road race B
Silver medal – second place	2016 Rio de Janeiro	Road time trial B
Silver medal – second place	2016 Rio de Janeiro	Individual pursuit B
Silver medal – second place	2020 Tokyo	Road time trial B
Silver medal – second place	2024 Paris	Road race B
Bronze medal – third place	2024 Paris	Road time trial B
Road World Championships
Silver medal – second place	2022 Baie-Comeau	Time trial B
Silver medal – second place	2023 Glasgow	Time trial B
Bronze medal – third place	2025 Ronse	Time trial B
Track World Championships
Bronze medal – third place	2022 Saint-Quentin-en-Yvelines	Individual pursuit B
European Championships
Silver medal – second place	2023 Rotterdam	Time trial B
Silver medal – second place	2023 Rotterdam	Road race B

Vincent ter Schure (born 24 October 1979) is a visually impaired Dutch Paralympic cyclist.

== Career ==
Ter Schure represented the Netherlands at the 2016 Summer Paralympics held in Rio de Janeiro, Brazil together with his sighted pilot Timo Fransen and he won one gold medal and two silver medals. He won the gold medal in the men's road race B event and the silver medals in the men's road time trial B and men's individual pursuit B events.

At the 2017 UCI Para-cycling Road World Championships held in Pietermaritzburg, South Africa, he won the bronze medal in the men's 31 km time trial event. In 2019, at the UCI Para-cycling Track World Championships held in Apeldoorn, Netherlands, he won the silver medal in the individual pursuit B event.

Ter Schure also represented the Netherlands at the 2020 Summer Paralympics held in Tokyo, Japan. He won two medals: the gold medal in the men's road race B event and the silver medal in the men's road time trial B event.

In 2022, Ter Schure won a silver medal at the UCI Para-cycling Road World Championships held in Baie-Comeau, Canada and a bronze medal at the UCI Para-cycling Track World Championships held in Saint-Quentin-en-Yvelines, France.
