= Ignacio Ávila =

Spanish Paralympic athlete (born 1979)

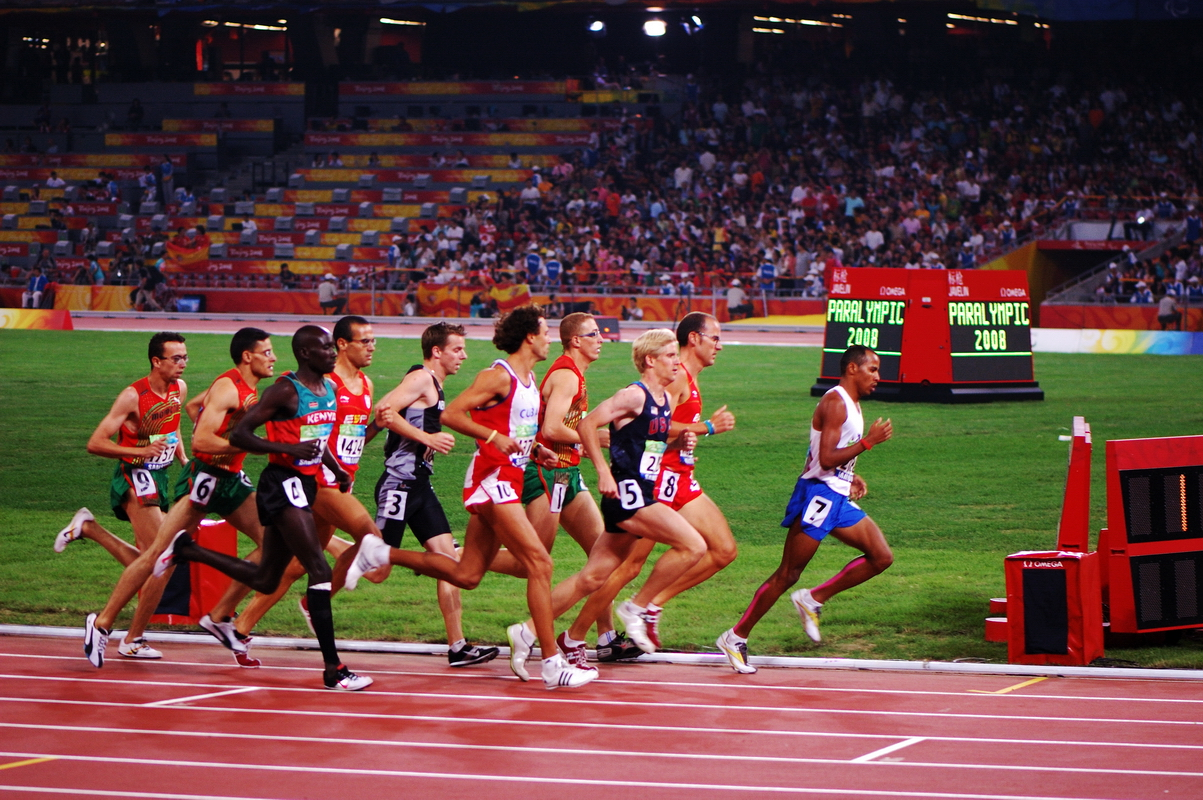
- Ignacio Ávila (number 8) in the men's 1500 metres T13 final at the 2008 Summer Paralympics

Personal information
- Full name: Ignacio Ávila Rodríguez
- Born: 19 January 1979 (age 47)

Sport
- Sport: Track and field
- Disability class: T12
Medal record
Representing Spain
Men's para-athletics
Paralympic Games
Gold medal – first place	2004 Athens	800m – T12
Silver medal – second place	2000 Sydney	4 × 400 m – T13
Bronze medal – third place	2008 Beijing	1500m – T13
IPC Athletics European Championships
Silver medal – second place	2012 Stadskanaal	800m – T12
Men's para-cycling
Paralympic Games
Silver medal – second place	2016 Rio de Janeiro	Road race – B

Ignacio Ávila Rodríguez (Note: In this Spanish name, the first or paternal surname is Ávila and the second or maternal family name is Rodríguez.) (born 19 January 1979) is a Paralympian athlete and cyclist from Spain competing mainly in category T12 middle-distance events in athletics, and in track time trial, track pursuit, road time trial and road race.

== Personal ==
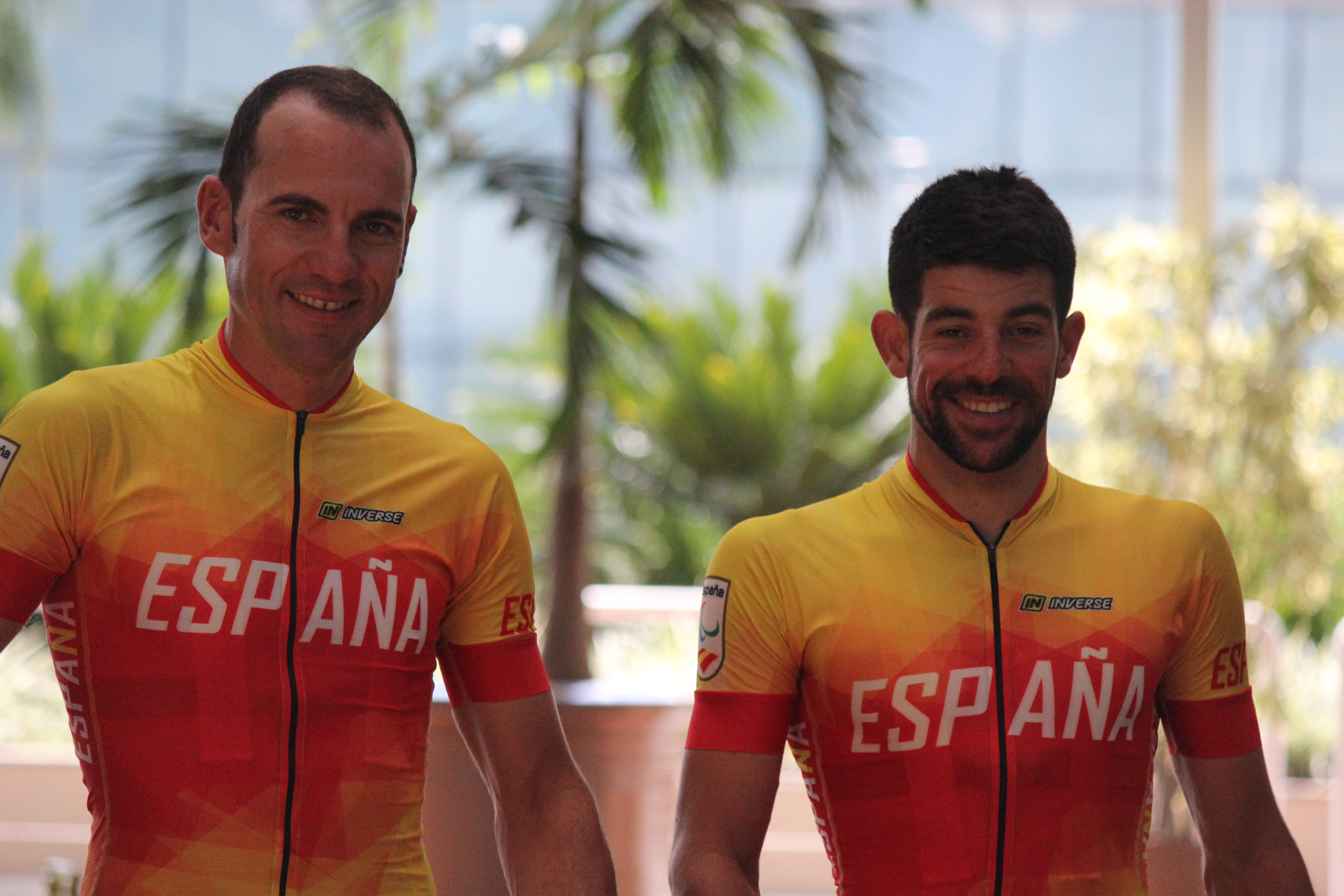
Ignacio and his cycling guide Joan Font.

He is from the Catalan region of Spain.

== Athletics ==
He medalled at the 2009 IBSA European Championships in Greece. He competed at the 2011 World Championships in Christchurch, New Zealand where he won a medal. Competing at the Brazil hosted IBSA World Games, he earned a medal. From the Catalan region of Spain, he was a recipient of a 2012 Plan ADO scholarship.

=== Paralympics ===
He competed in the 2000 Summer Paralympics in Sydney, Australia. There he won a silver medal in the men's 4 × 400 metre relay — T13 event, went out in the first round of the men's 200 metres — T12 event and finished fourth in the men's 400 metres — T12 event. He also competed at the 2004 Summer Paralympics in Athens, Greece. There he won a gold medal in the men's 800 metres — T12 event, finished fourth in the men's 400 metres — T12 event and finished sixth in the men's 1500 metres — T13 event. He also competed at the 2008 Summer Paralympics in Beijing, China. There he won a bronze medal in the men's 1500 metres — T13 event and finished fourth in the men's 800 metres — T12 event.

== Cycling ==
=== Paralympics ===
He competed with him guide Joan Font in the 2016 Summer Paralympics in Rio de Janeiro, Brazil. There he won a silver medal in the men's road race — B event. He also competed in track time trial, finishing 7th, and in 4000 m individual pursuit, where he classified for the bronze medal contest, losing against the Dutch Stephen de Vries.
