= Yoann Paillot =

French cyclist (born 1991)

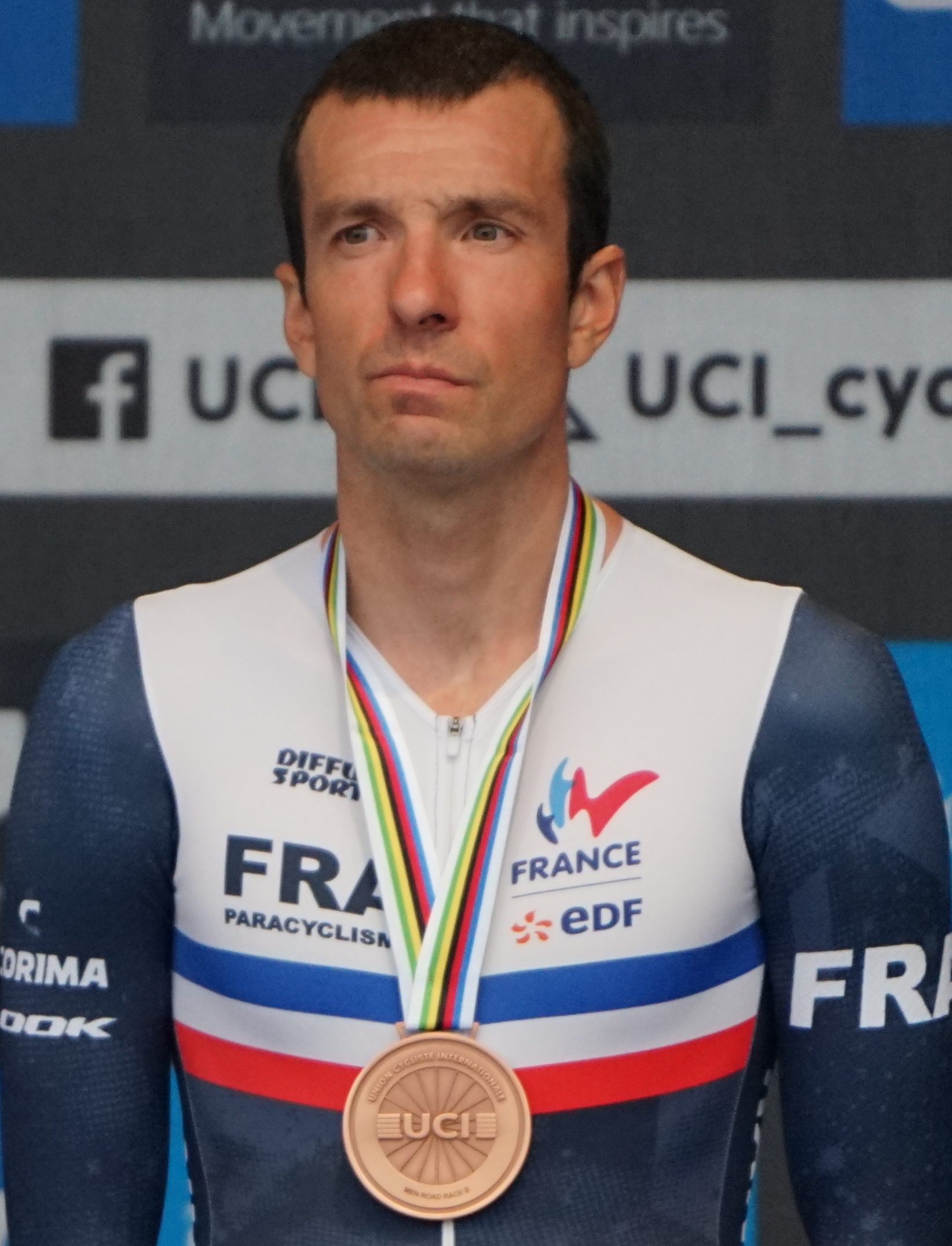
- Paillot at the 2024 UCI Para-cycling Road World Championships

Personal information
- Full name: Yoann Paillot
- Born: 28 May 1991 (age 35) Angoulême, France
- Height: 1.87 m (6 ft 2 in)
- Weight: 72 kg (159 lb)

Cycling career
- Sport: Cycling
- Discipline: Road
- Role: Rider
- Rider type: Time trialist

Amateur teams
- 2009–2012: Top 16
- 2016–2017: Océane Top 16
- 2023: Morbihan Fybolia GOA

Professional teams
- 2012: La Pomme Marseille (stagiaire)
- 2013–2015: La Pomme Marseille
- 2018–2022: St. Michel–Auber93
Medal record
Representing France
Men's road bicycle racing
World Championships
| Silver medal – second place | 2013 Tuscany | Under-23 time trial |
European Championships
| Gold medal – first place | 2011 Offida | Under-23 time trial |
Mediterranean Games
| Gold medal – first place | 2013 Mersin | Time trial |
Men's para-cycling
Paralympic Games
| Bronze medal – third place | 2024 Paris | Road race B |
Road World Championships
| Silver medal – second place | 2024 Zurich | Time trial B |
| Bronze medal – third place | 2024 Zurich | Road race B |

Yoann Paillot (born 28 May 1991 in Angoulême) is a French cyclist, who last rode for club team Morbihan Fybolia GOA.

== Major results ==
2009
3rd Time trial, National Junior Road Championships
2010
4th Chrono des Nations U23
2011
1st Time trial, UEC European Under-23 Road Championships
1st Chrono des Nations U23
2nd Time trial, National Under-23 Road Championships
6th Chrono Champenois
2012
1st Chrono des Nations U23
2nd Overall Kreiz Breizh Elites

1st Young rider classification

3rd Time trial, National Road Championships
3rd Grand Prix de la ville de Buxerolles
6th Time trial, UEC European Under-23 Road Championships
6th Overall Thüringen Rundfahrt der U23
2013
1st Time trial, Mediterranean Games
1st Time trial, National Under-23 Road Championships
2nd Time trial, UCI Under-23 Road World Championships
4th Tour du Jura
2015
1st Stage 3 (TTT) Circuit des Ardennes
2016
1st Stage 4 Kreiz Breizh Elites
6th Paris–Mantes-en-Yvelines
2017
2nd Time trial, National Road Championships
5th Overall Tour de Gironde
2018
2nd Grand Prix de la Ville de Lillers
3rd Overall Etoile de Bessèges
3rd Overall Tour Poitou-Charentes en Nouvelle-Aquitaine
4th Chrono des Nations
2019
4th Time trial, National Road Championships
5th Overall Tour Poitou-Charentes en Nouvelle-Aquitaine
6th Overall Étoile de Bessèges
6th Polynormande
2020
4th Time trial, National Road Championships
9th Overall Tour Poitou-Charentes en Nouvelle-Aquitaine
