= Nick Yallouris =

Australian cyclist

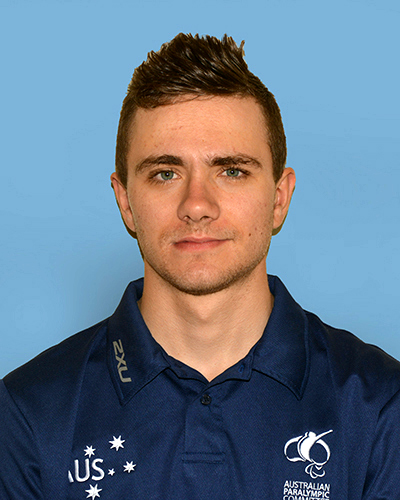
- 2016 Australian Paralympic team portrait of Nick Yallouris

Personal information
- Nationality: Australian
- Born: 24 February 1994 (age 32) Gosford, New South Wales

Sport
- Sport: Cycling
- Club: Central Coast
Medal record
Representing Australia
Men's track cycling
World Championships
Gold medal – first place	2017 Hong Kong	Team pursuit

Nick Yallouris (born 24 February 1994) is an Australian track cyclist. He represented Australia in the 2016 Rio Paralympics as a sighted pilot for Australian cycling Paralympian, Matt Formston.

== Personal ==
Yallouris was born on 24 February 1974 in Gosford, New South Wales. Yallouris currently resides in Chittaway Point on the NSW Central Coast. He is a bicycle mechanic by trade.

== Career ==
Yallouris has had a passion for bicycles since a young age. He is from a BMX background and was introduced to track cycling in 2010. In 2015, he won the madison and came third in the elite scratch race and elite time trial at the 2015 Australian National Track Championships. Yallouris was then selected to join the Australian Paralympic Cycling Team. His debut for Australia in the Para-cycling team was at the 2015 UCI Para-cycling Track World Championships in the Netherlands where he paired up with Commonwealth Games medallist Paul Kennedy. They finished sixth with a time of (1:04.274). At the Rio Paralympics, Yallouris will be the pilot for Formston. They train up to 13 times per week.

== Recognition ==
- 2012 - Central Coast Cyclist of the Year
