= Alexandre Lloveras =

French Para-cyclist

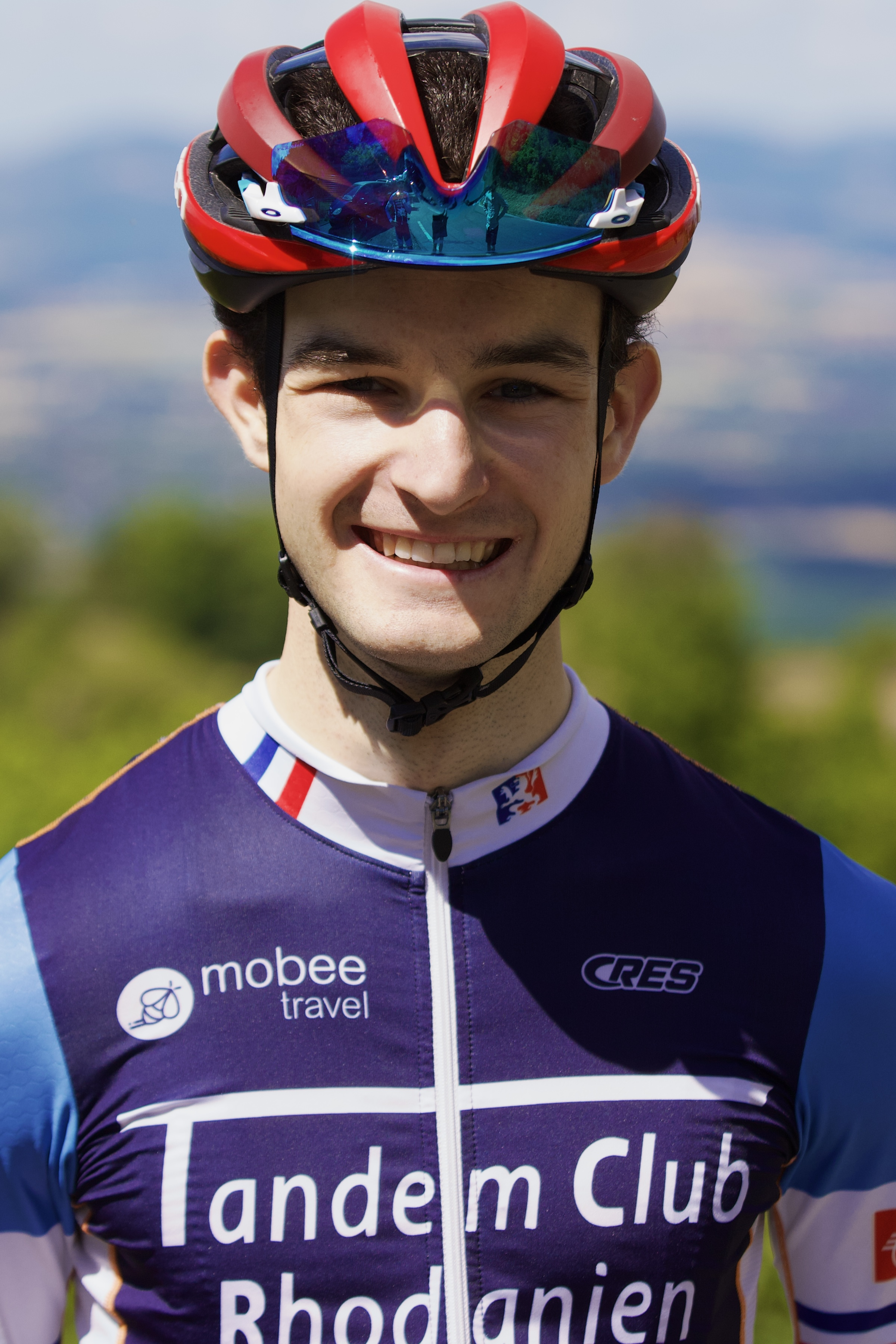
- Lloveras in 2022

Personal information
- Nationality: French
- Born: 26 June 2000 (age 26) Lyon, France

Sport
- Sport: Para-cycling
- Disability: Leber congenital amaurosis
- Disability class: B
Medal record
Men's para-cycling
Representing France
Paralympic Games
Gold medal – first place	2020 Tokyo	Road time trial B
Bronze medal – third place	2020 Tokyo	Road race B
Bronze medal – third place	2020 Tokyo	Individual pursuit B
Bronze medal – third place	2024 Paris	Road race B
Road World Championships
Silver medal – second place	2021 Cascais	Time trial B
Silver medal – second place	2022 Baie-Comeau	Road race B
Silver medal – second place	2024 Zurich	Time trial B
Bronze medal – third place	2022 Baie-Comeau	Time trial B
Bronze medal – third place	2024 Zurich	Road race B
Track World Championships
Silver medal – second place	2023 Glasgow	Individual pursuit B
Bronze medal – third place	2022 Saint-Quentin-en-Yvelines	Tandem B sprint

Alexandre Lloveras (born 26 June 2000) is a French para-cyclist who represented France at the 2020 and 2024 Summer Paralympics.

== Career ==
Lloveras represented France in the men's road time trial B event at the 2020 Summer Paralympics and won a gold medal. He also competed in the men's individual pursuit B event and finished in fourth place. On 31 May 2022, bronze medal winner Marcin Polak was stripped of his medal and suspended for four years for breaching anti-doping rules. As a result Lloveras was upgraded to the bronze medal.
