= Stephen de Vries =

Dutch paralympic cyclist

Personal information
- Born: November 17, 1995 (age 30)

Sport
- Country: Netherlands; Ireland (2026–)
- Sport: Track cycling
Medal record
Representing Netherlands
Track cycling
Paralympic Games
Bronze medal – third place	2016 Rio de Janeiro	Men's individual pursuit B
Track World Championships
Gold medal – first place	2015 Apeldoorn	4km Pursuit B
Bronze medal – third place	2016 Montichiari	1km Time Trial B

Stephen de Vries is a Irish-Dutch paralympic cyclist. He participated at the 2016 Summer Paralympics in the cycling competition, being awarded the bronze medal in the men's individual pursuit B event. Patrick Bos was his pilot.

He represented the Netherlands until switching to represent Ireland in 2026, as his mother is Irish.
