= Timo Fransen =

Dutch cyclist (born 1987)

Personal information
- Born: 3 June 1987 (age 39) Westervoort, Netherlands

Sport
- Country: Netherlands
- Sport: Cycling
Medal record
Paralympic Games
Gold medal – first place	2016 Rio de Janeiro	Road race B
Silver medal – second place	2016 Rio de Janeiro	Road time trial B
Silver medal – second place	2016 Rio de Janeiro	Individual pursuit B
Silver medal – second place	2020 Tokyo	Road time trial B
Silver medal – second place	2024 Paris	Road race B
Bronze medal – third place	2024 Paris	Road time trial B
Road World Championships
Silver medal – second place	2023 Glasgow	Time trial B

Timo Fransen (born 3 June 1987) is a Dutch Paralympic cyclist competing in tandem events for the Netherlands, serving as a sighted pilot for blind cyclist Vincent ter Schure.

== Career ==
Ter Schure and Fransen represented the Netherlands at the 2016 Summer Paralympics held in Rio de Janeiro, Brazil and they won one gold medal and two silver medals. They won the gold medal in the men's road race B event and the silver medals in the men's road time trial B and men's individual pursuit B events.

At the 2019 UCI Para-cycling Road World Championships held in Emmen, Netherlands, Fransen and ter Schure won the gold medal in the time trial event. In January 2020, together with Imke Brommer, Larissa Klaassen and ter Schure, he won the team sprint at the UCI Para-cycling Track World Championships and finished third in the pursuit.
