= Adam Duggleby =

British cyclist (born 1984)

Adam Duggleby MBE
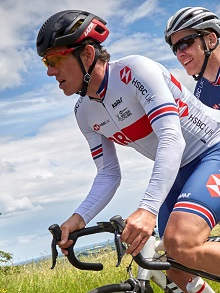
- Adam Duggleby piloting Steve Bate

Personal information
- Nationality: British
- Born: Adam Christopher John Duggleby; 16 October 1984 (age 42) Beverley, East Riding of Yorkshire
- Website: www.adamduggleby.com

Sport
- Country: Great Britain
- Sport: Cycling
Medal record
Men's Para-cycling
Representing Great Britain
Paralympic Games
Gold medal – first place	2016 Rio de Janeiro	Individual pursuit B
Gold medal – first place	2016 Rio de Janeiro	Road time trial B
Bronze medal – third place	2016 Rio de Janeiro	Road race B
Silver medal – second place	2020 Tokyo	Individual Pursuit B
World Championships
Silver medal – second place	2017 Pietermaritzburg	Road time trial B
Gold medal – first place	2018 Rio de Janeiro	Individual Pursuit B
Gold medal – first place	2018 Maniago	Road time trial B
Silver medal – second place	2019 Emmen	Road time trial B
Silver medal – second place	2020 Milton	Individual Pursuit B
Gold medal – first place	2021 Cascais	Road time trial B

Adam Christopher John Duggleby (born 16 October 1984) is a British cyclist. He represented Great Britain at the 2016 Rio Paralympics as a sighted pilot for visually impaired cyclist Stephen Bate, with whom he was paired in January 2014. The pair won gold in the men's individual pursuit B and men's road time trial B, and bronze in the men's road race B.

In 2017 Duggleby broke two Cycling Time Trials national records: tricycle 10 miles and 100 miles bicycle. Duggleby also won the British Best All-Rounder time trial competition for 2017. He then won the 2018 CTT national 12hr time trial championship, breaking the national record in the process.

In 2018 Duggleby and Bate won the UCI World 4 km Tandem B Pursuit and the UCI World Tandem B Time Trial, both for the first time. The pair are current World Tandem B Time Trial champions, after winning the title in 2021 at the UCI Paracycling World Championships in Cascais, Portugal.

At the 2020 Tokyo Paralympics, Duggleby and Bate won silver in the men's individual pursuit B.

== Palmarès ==
2000

2nd Under 16 British Circuit Race Championships, British National Circuit Race Championships

2001

1st George Herbert Stancer 10 Mile Time Trial Championship
1st Junior 10 Mile Time Trial Championship

2002

1st Junior 10 Mile Time Trial Championship

2009

1st British National Team Time Trial, Shorter Rochford R.T., Team: Charles McCulloch, Mark Holton, Adam Duggleby

2011

1st British National Team Time Trial, ScienceinSport.com, Team: Alistair Rutherford, Alexander Royle, Adam Duggleby
2nd 20 km Scratch Race, British National Track Championships

2012

1st 20 km Scratch Race, British National Track Championships

2013

1st British National Team Pursuit, British National Track Championships

2015

2nd, Road Race, UCI Para-cycling Road World Cup, Maniago

3rd, Time Trial, UCI Para-cycling Road World Cup, Maniago

1st, Time Trial, UCI Para-cycling Road World Cup, Pietermaritzburg

2016

3rd, Time Trial, UCI Para-cycling Road World Cup, Ostend

Gold, Individual Pursuit B, 2016 Summer Paralympics, Rio de Janeiro

Gold, Time Trial, 2016 Summer Paralympics, Rio de Janeiro

Bronze, Road Race, 2016 Summer Paralympics, Rio de Janeiro

2017

2nd, Time Trial, UCI Para-cycling Road World Championships, South Africa

Winner British Best All-Rounder Time Trial Competition

2018

Gold, UCI Para-cycling Track World Championships – Men's individual pursuit B, Rio de Janeiro, Brazil

Gold, UCI Para-cycling Road World Championships - Men's individual Time Trial B, Maniago Italy

1st, UCI Para-cycling Road World Cup - Men's individual Time Trial B, Baie Comeau, Canada

3rd CTT National 50 Mile Time Trial

3rd CTT National 100 Mile Time Trial

1st CTT National 12 Hour Time Trial

2nd British Best All-Rounder Time Trial Competition

2019

2nd, UCI Para-cycling Road World Cup - Men's individual Time Trial B, Baie Comeau, Canada

Silver, UCI Para-cycling Road World Championships - Men's individual Time Trial B, Emmen, Netherlands

3rd CTT National 10 Mile Time Trial

2020

Silver, UCI Para-cycling Track World Championships – Men's individual pursuit B, Milton, Canada

3rd CTT National 100 Mile Time Trial

2021

Gold, UCI Para-cycling Road World Championships - Men's individual Time Trial B, Cascais, Portugal

== 2016 Summer Paralympics ==
In September 2016, Duggleby and Bate won three medals at the 2016 Summer Paralympics in Rio de Janeiro. On 8 September 2016, they won a gold medal in the Men's individual pursuit B; during qualification, the pair set the Men's Individual pursuit B 4 km world record with 4.08.146. On 14 September, they won their second gold medal, in the Men's individual Time Trial B. Finally, on 17 September, Duggleby and Bate won a bronze medal in the Men's individual Road Race B.

Duggleby was appointed Member of the Order of the British Empire (MBE) in the 2017 New Year Honours for services to cycling.
