= Marcin Polak =

Polish Paralympic cyclist

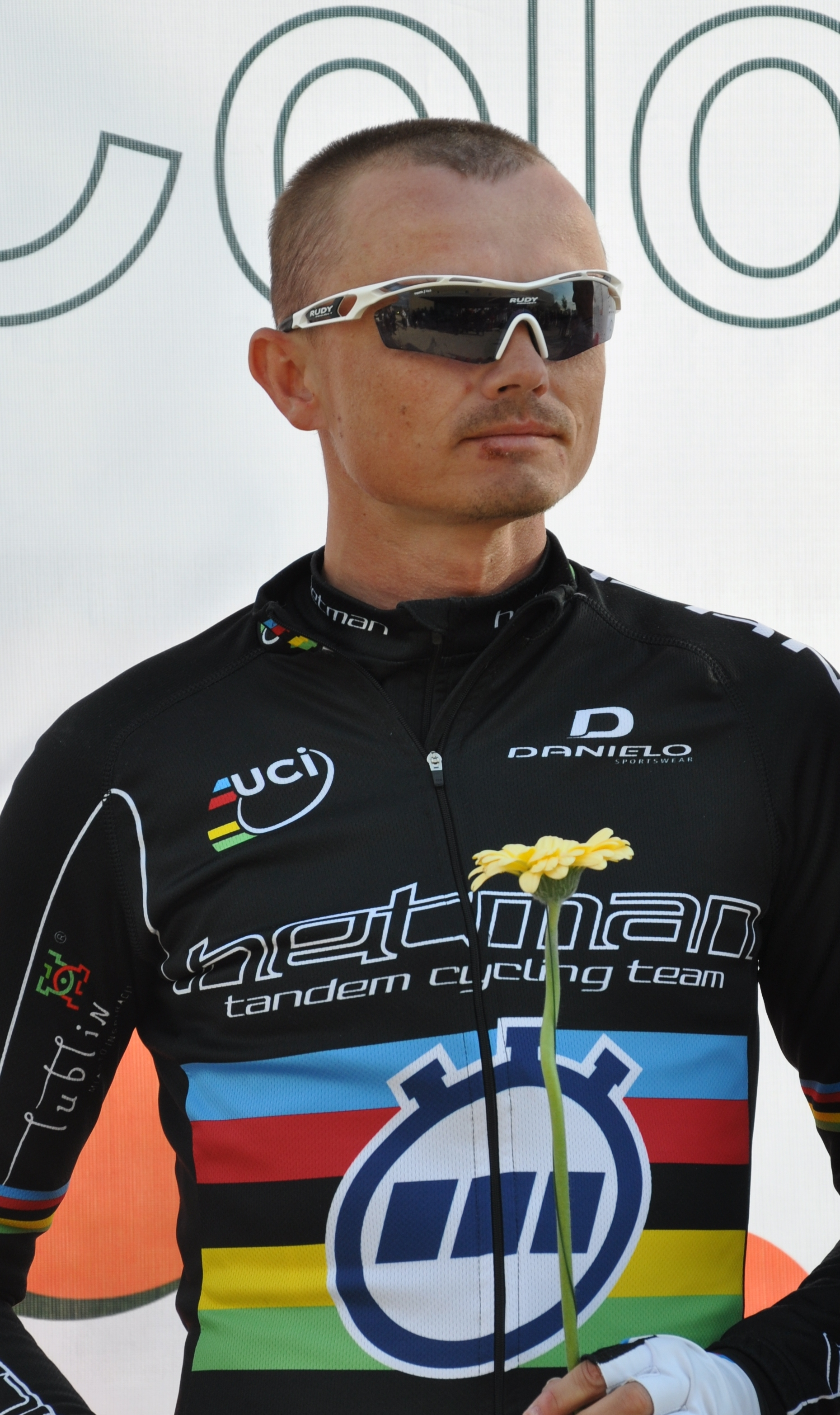
- Polak in 2016

Personal information
- Born: 25 November 1982 (age 43) Bełżyce, Poland

Sport
- Country: Poland
- Sport: Para-cycling
Medal record
Men's para-cycling
Representing Poland
Road World Championships
Gold medal – first place	2015 Nottwil	Road time trial B
Gold medal – first place	2017 Pietermaritzburg	Road time trial B
Track World Championships
Gold medal – first place	2019 Apeldoorn	Individual pursuit B

Marcin Polak (born 25 November 1982) is a Polish para-cyclist. He represented Poland at the 2016 and 2020 Summer Paralympics.

== Career ==
On 31 January 2020, Polak set the world record in the 4 km individual pursuit in the B classification with a time of 4 minutes 3.528 seconds.

He won a bronze medal in the men's individual pursuit B event at the 2020 Summer Paralympics. On 31 May 2022, he was stripped of his medal and suspended for four years for breaching anti-doping rules.
