= Stephen Bate =

New Zealand–British Paralympic cyclist

Stephen Bate MBE
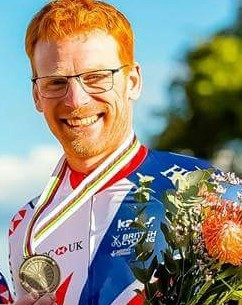
- Bate in 2018

Personal information
- Nationality: New Zealand, British
- Born: 24 August 1977 (age 48) New Zealand
- Website: www.stevebatembe.com

Sport
- Country: Great Britain
- Sport: Para-cycling
- Disability class: B
Medal record
Men's Para-cycling
Representing Great Britain
Paralympic Games
Gold medal – first place	2016 Rio de Janeiro	Individual pursuit B
Gold medal – first place	2016 Rio de Janeiro	Road time trial B
Silver medal – second place	2020 Tokyo	Individual pursuit B
Silver medal – second place	2024 Paris	Individual pursuit B
Bronze medal – third place	2016 Rio de Janeiro	Road race B
Road World Championships
Silver medal – second place	2017 Pietermaritzburg	Road time trial B
Gold medal – first place	2018 Maniago	Road time trial B
Silver medal – second place	2019 Emmen	Road time trial B
Gold medal – first place	2021 Cascais	Road time trial B
Track World Championships
Gold medal – first place	2018 Rio de Janeiro	Individual Pursuit B
Gold medal – first place	2022 Saint-Quentin-en-Yvelines	Individual pursuit B
Gold medal – first place	2025 Rio de Janeiro	Individual pursuit B
Silver medal – second place	2020 Milton	Individual Pursuit B
Bronze medal – third place	2023 Glasgow	Individual pursuit B

Stephen Stanley Bate (born 24 August 1977) is a New Zealand–British para-cyclist who competes in tandem races as an athlete with a visual impairment. Since 2014, Bate has been piloted by Adam Duggleby. At the 2016 Rio Olympics, the pair won gold in the men's individual pursuit B and men's road time trial B, and bronze in the men's road race B.

In 2018 Bate and Duggleby won the UCI World Para-cycling Tandem B Individual Pursuit and the UCI World Para-cycling Tandem B Individual Time Trial to become double World Champions. The pair are current World Tandem B Time Trial champions, after winning the title in 2021 at the UCI Paracycling World Championships in Cascais, Portugal.

== Cycling career ==
Bate was introduced to the ideas of para-cycling by friend and Great Britain team member Karen Darke; both of whom have conquered El Capitan in Yosemite National Park. Bate has climbed the rock face 3 times including a solo ascent of Zodiac, becoming the first visually impaired person to achieve this. In 2013 he was accepted onto British Cycling’s Paralympic Development Programme and, was teamed up with sight piloted Adam Duggleby. In December 2014, after became the British road and time trial national champion, Bate was advanced from the development programme to the Paralympic Podium Programme, for athletes who British Cycling believe have medal potential at Paralympic level. The next year he made his World Championship debut, competing at the 2015 Championships in Apeldoorn.

In 2015 Bate and Duggleby won their first World Cup medals together. At Maniago in Italy they took silver in the road race and a bronze in the time trial; and followed this with a gold medal in the time trial at the Pietermaritzburg World Cup in South Africa. In July 2016, Bate was named in the Great Britain team to compete at the 2016 Summer Paralympics in Rio.

Bate was appointed Member of the Order of the British Empire (MBE) in the 2017 New Year Honours for services to cycling.

At the 2020 Tokyo Paralympics, Duggleby and Bate won silver in the men's individual pursuit B.

At the 2024 Summer Paralympics in Paris, France, Bate competed with sighted pilot Christopher Latham in the men's pursuit B. The pair set a new world record in qualifying to reach the gold medal final. However, previous world record holders Tristan Bangma and Patrick Bos of the Netherlands retook the world record in their qualifying run and went on to beat Bate and Latham in the final, meaning the British pair won a silver medal.

In October 2025, Bate and his pilot Chris Latham won the gold medal in the men's tandem (B) individual pursuit at the 2025 UCI Para-cycling Track World Championships, marking the final world title of Bate's career.

Following the event, he announced his retirement from elite competition, concluding a 12-year tenure on the Great Britain Cycling Team's Para-cycling performance programme.

== Personal history ==
Bate was born (in 1977) and brought up in New Zealand and attended Mount Albert Grammar School, from 1991-1994, before moving to Moray in Scotland in adulthood. He has Retinitis Pigmentosa which has left him with a 10% field of vision.
