= Matt Formston =

Australian para-athlete

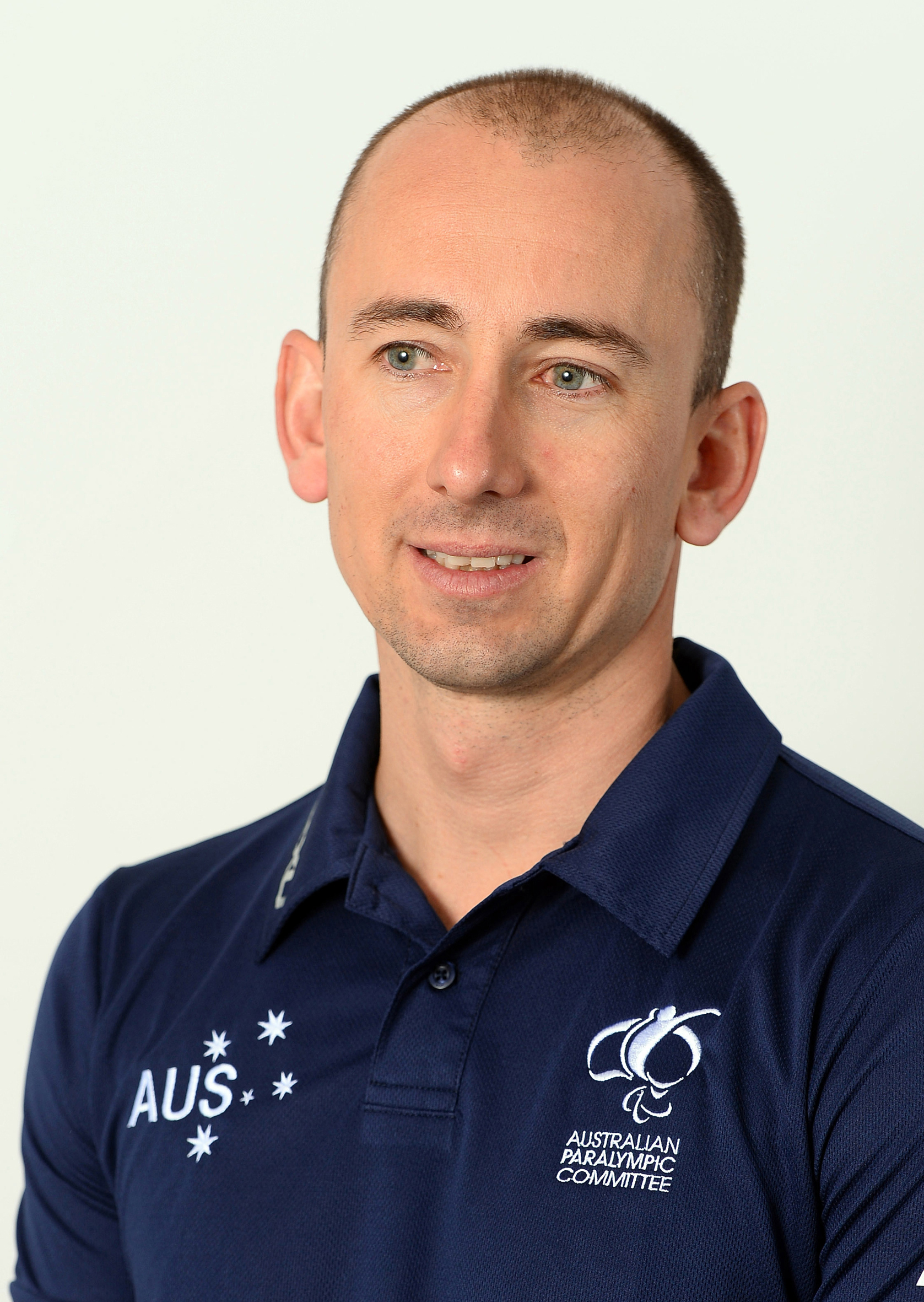
- 2016 Australian Paralympic team portrait

Personal information
- Nickname: Formo
- Born: 21 July 1978 (age 48) Sydney

Sport
- Disability: Visual impairment
- Club: Central Coast
Medal record
Men's para-cycling
Representing Australia
UCI Para-cycling Track World Championships
Gold medal – first place	Aguascalientes 2014	Tandem B Pursuit
Silver medal – second place	Appledoon 2015	Tandem B Pursuit

Matthew Grant Formston AM (born 21 July 1978) is an Australian para-athlete. He is legally blind as a result of macular dystrophy, a degenerative eye condition diagnosed in childhood, and has competed internationally in both para-cycling and para-surfing. Formston won ten Australian national para-cycling titles between 2011 and 2016 and represented Australia at the 2016 Rio Paralympic Games, before moving into competitive para-surfing, where he has won four world titles. In 2022 he set a Guinness World Record for the largest wave surfed by a male in the IS2 visually impaired classification. Alongside his sporting career he has worked as a senior executive at Optus and as a public speaker. He was appointed a Member of the Order of Australia in 2025.

== Early and personal life ==
Formston was born in Sydney, New South Wales. When he was five years old, he was diagnosed with macular dystrophy, a condition affecting the retina that left him with no central vision and only a small amount of peripheral vision. He has three children with his wife Bex.

== Career ==
Formston represented Australia in tandem para-cycling from 2011 to 2016, riding in the B classification for athletes with vision impairment. Over that period he won ten Australian national titles and two medals at UCI Para-cycling World Championships, and set a world record in the men's 4000 m individual pursuit B.

In 2013, Formston and pilot Michael Curran won the men's tandem road race at the UCI Para-cycling Road World Cup Finals in Matane, Canada.

At the 2014 UCI Para-cycling Track World Championships in Aguascalientes, Mexico, Formston and Curran set a world record of 4:11.213 in the 4 km tandem pursuit, and went on to win the gold medal in a time of 4:13.105.

At the 2015 UCI Para-cycling Track World Championships in Apeldoorn, Netherlands, Formston and Curran finished second in the tandem 4 km pursuit, earning a silver medal.

Formston represented Australia at the 2016 Rio Paralympics in tandem track cycling with pilot Nick Yallouris, finishing fifth in the 4000 m individual pursuit B and sixth in the 1000 m time trial B. He retired from competitive cycling shortly after the Games.

After retiring from cycling, Formston moved into competitive para-surfing, competing in the visually impaired division. He won the visually impaired division at the 2017 ISA World Adaptive Surfing Championship in San Diego, California, won gold in the AS-VI division at the 2018 Stance ISA World Adaptive Surfing Championship at La Jolla, and won the Men's Visually Impaired 2 division at the 2020 AmpSurf ISA World Para Surfing Championship.

Formston won the Partial Vision Impairment division of the 2022 Association of Adaptive Surfing Professionals (AASP) Championship Tour, topping the final rankings across the tour's Hawaii and US Open events. He has also won his division at the Hawaii Adaptive Surfing Championships in 2017, 2018 and 2022, and at the US Open Adaptive Surfing Championships in 2017 and 2023.

On 30 November 2022, Formston surfed a 15.48-metre (50.80 ft) wave at Nazaré in Portugal, setting a Guinness World Record for the largest wave surfed by a male in the IS2 visually impaired classification.

Formston received the Heavy Water Award at the 2022 Australian Surfing Awards, presented in February 2023.

== Other activities ==
Formston works at Optus, where he is Head of Sustainability and Corporate Social Responsibility for Optus Business. In 2021, Formston was elected inaugural Chair of Surfing Australia's Para-Surfing Council, a body created to foster input from the para-surfing community and identify priority initiatives for the sport in Australia. He is also a member of the Evidence Advisory Committee for the National Disability Insurance Scheme (NDIS), appointed by the Australian Government to provide advice on the suitability of disability supports for NDIS funding. Formston is a company director and executive coach, and a graduate member of the Australian Institute of Company Directors.

Formston has served as a director on the board of Blind Sports NSW.

Surfing in the Dark, a children's picture book featuring Formston that integrates braille alongside printed text, was created and published by Vision Australia and Berbay Publishing as the first title in the Big Visions series. It was launched at the Melbourne Museum in June 2024.

In 2026 Formston published Why Not?: Breaking Limits in Sport, Business and Life, in which he sets out eight personal standards drawn from his sporting and business career.

Formston is the subject of the 2024 documentary The Blind Sea, directed by Daniel Fenech, which had its world premiere at the Sydney Film Festival in June 2024 before a national cinema release in August 2024 and subsequently streaming on Netflix.

In 2024, Formston was named a finalist for the Blind Australian of the Year Award.

== Honours and achievements ==
Formston was appointed a Member of the Order of Australia (AM) in the 2025 Australia Day Honours for "significant service to people with disability and to para sports".
