= Tristan Bangma =

Dutch Paralympic cyclist

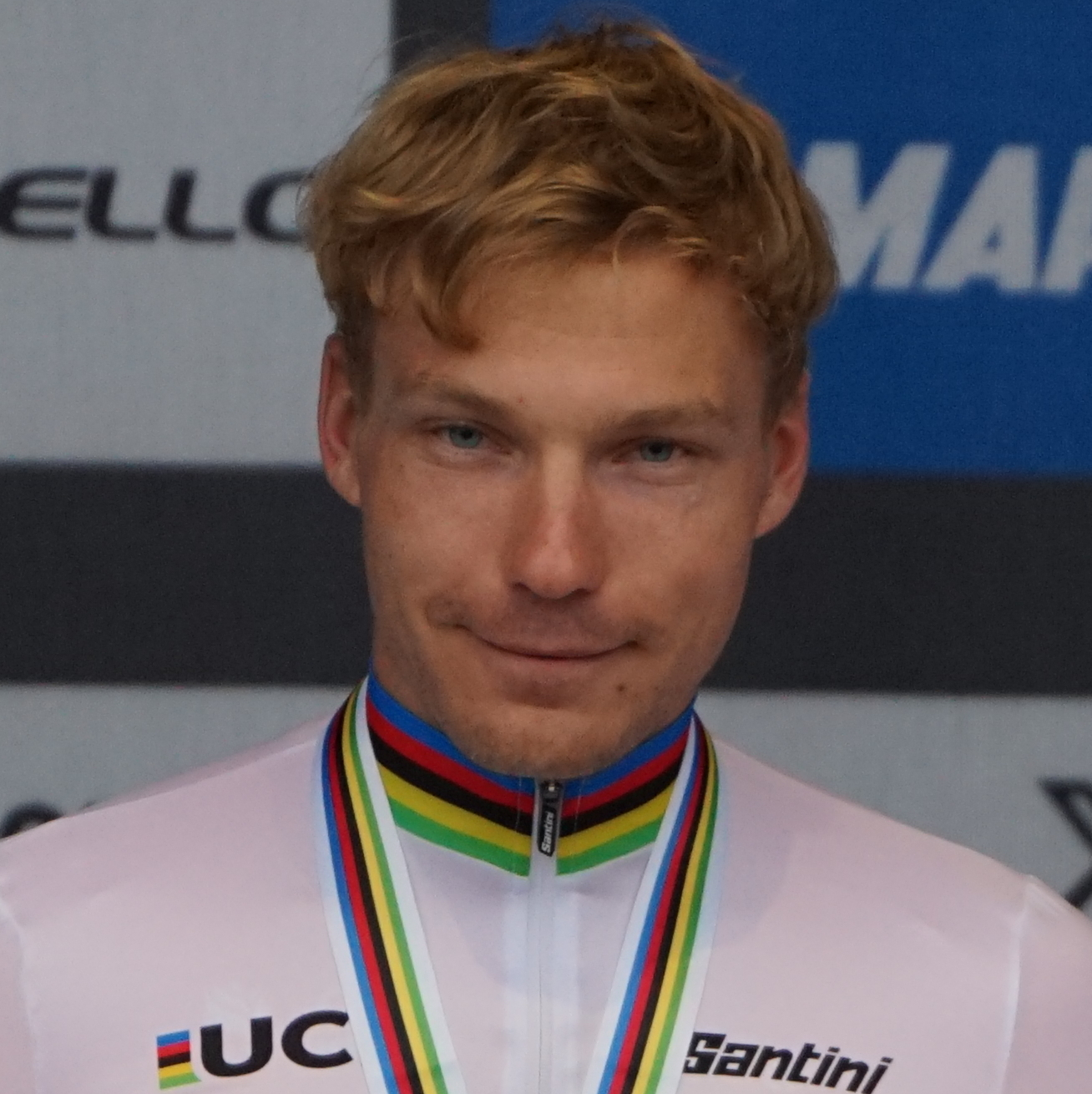
- Bangma at the 2024 UCI Para-cycling Road World Championships

Personal information
- Born: 6 October 1997 (age 29) Donkerbroek, Netherlands

Sport
- Country: Netherlands
- Sport: Para-cycling
- Disability: Vision impairment
Medal record
Paralympic Games
Gold medal – first place	2016 Rio de Janeiro	1 km time trial B
Gold medal – first place	2020 Tokyo	Individual pursuit B
Gold medal – first place	2024 Paris	Individual pursuit B
Gold medal – first place	2024 Paris	Road time trial B
Gold medal – first place	2024 Paris	Road race B
Silver medal – second place	2020 Tokyo	Road race B
Road World Championships
Gold medal – first place	2022 Baie-Comeau	Time trial B
Gold medal – first place	2022 Baie-Comeau	Road race B
Gold medal – first place	2023 Glasgow	Time trial B
Gold medal – first place	2024 Zurich	Time trial B
Gold medal – first place	2024 Zurich	Road race B
Silver medal – second place	2025 Ronse	Time trial B
Track World Championships
Gold medal – first place	2023 Glasgow	Individual pursuit B
Gold medal – first place	2026 Apeldoorn	Individual pursuit B
Silver medal – second place	2022 Saint-Quentin-en-Yvelines	Individual pursuit C2
Silver medal – second place	2026 Apeldoorn	Tandem B kilo
European Championships
Gold medal – first place	2023 Rotterdam	Time trial B
Gold medal – first place	2023 Rotterdam	Road race B

Tristan Bangma (born 6 October 1997) is a visually impaired Dutch Paralympic cyclist. He is a gold medalist in cycling at the 2016 Summer Paralympics, the 2020 Summer Paralympics and the 2024 Summer Paralympics.

At the 2016 Summer Paralympics held in Rio de Janeiro, Brazil, he won the gold medal in the men's 1 km time trial B with his sighted pilot Teun Mulder. In 2021, he won the gold medal in the men's individual pursuit B at the 2020 Summer Paralympics held in Tokyo, Japan with his sighted pilot Patrick Bos. He also won the silver medal in the men's road race B at the 2020 Summer Paralympics. He won the gold medal again in the men's pursuit B at the 2024 Summer Paralympics held in Paris, France with his sighted pilot Patrick Bos.

== Career ==
At the 2016 UCI Para-cycling Track World Championships held in Montichiari, Italy, Bangma and Teun Mulder won the silver medal in the Sprint Tandem B event and also in the 1 km time trial Tandem B event.

Bangma also won the silver medal in the 109.3 km road race at the 2017 UCI Para-cycling Road World Championships held in Pietermaritzburg, South Africa. At the 2018 UCI Para-cycling Track World Championships held in Rio de Janeiro, Brazil, he won three medals in total: one silver medal and two bronze medals.

At the 2019 UCI Para-cycling Track World Championships held in Apeldoorn, Netherlands, Bangma and Patrick Bos won the bronze medal in the men's time trial B event.

In 2022, Bangma won two gold medals at the UCI Para-cycling Road World Championships held in Baie-Comeau, Canada. He also won a silver medal at the 2022 UCI Para-cycling Track World Championships held in Saint-Quentin-en-Yvelines, France.
