= Patrick Bos =

Dutch cyclist (born 1987)

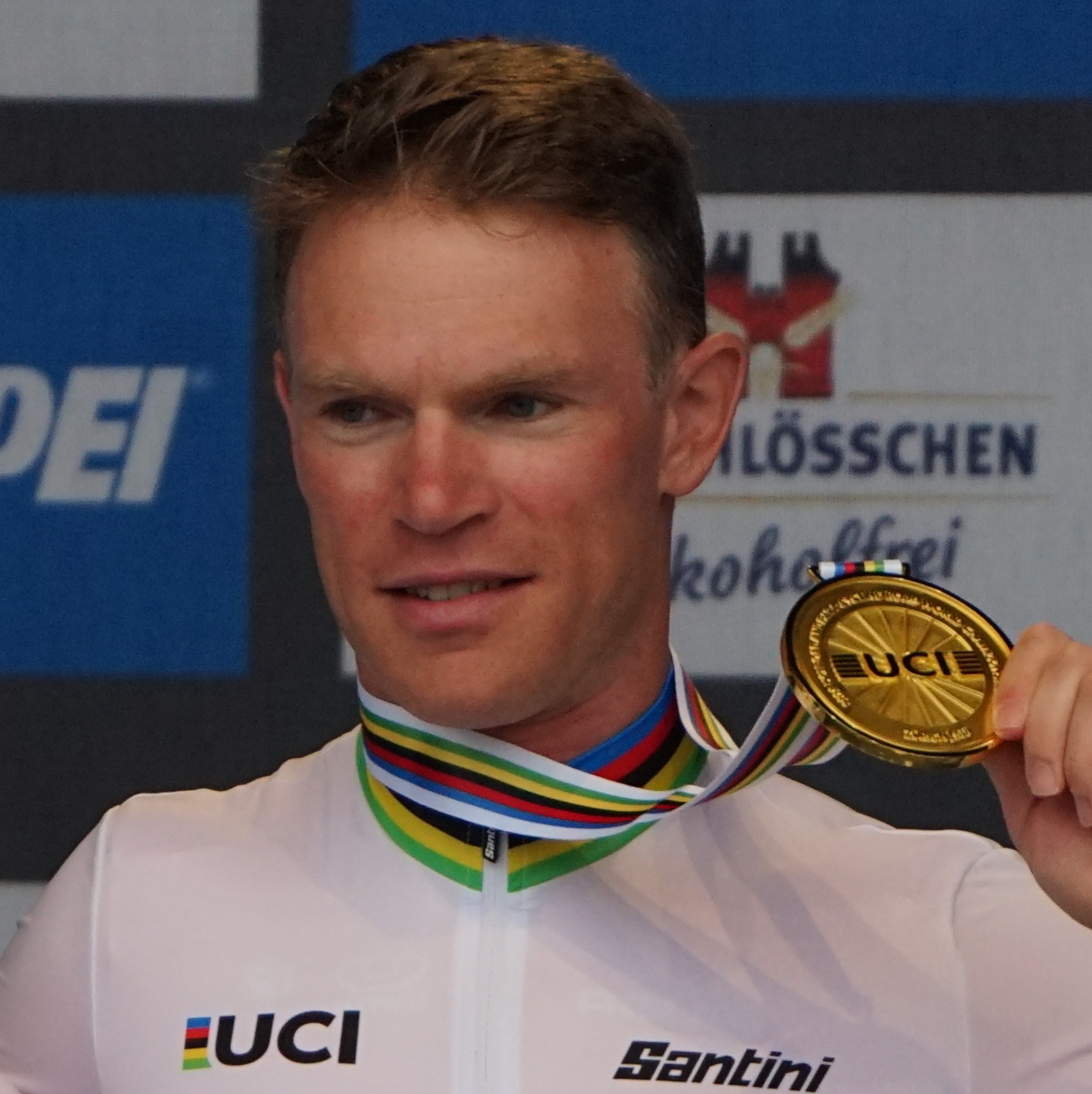
- Bos at the 2024 UCI Para-cycling Road World Championships

Personal information
- Born: 20 August 1987 (age 39) Amstelveen, Netherlands

Sport
- Sport: Paralympic road cycling Paralympic track cycling
Medal record
Men's para-cycling
Representing Netherlands
Paralympic Games
| Gold medal – first place | 2020 Tokyo | Individual pursuit B |
| Gold medal – first place | 2024 Paris | Individual pursuit B |
| Gold medal – first place | 2024 Paris | Road time trial B |
| Gold medal – first place | 2024 Paris | Road race B |
| Bronze medal – third place | 2012 London | 1 km time trial B |
| Bronze medal – third place | 2016 Rio | Individual pursuit B |
Track World Championships
| Gold medal – first place | 2023 Glasgow | Individual pursuit B |
| Gold medal – first place | 2026 Apeldoorn | Individual pursuit B |
| Bronze medal – third place | 2011 Montichiari | Tandem B sprint |
| Bronze medal – third place | 2016 Montichiari | Time trial B |
| Bronze medal – third place | 2018 Rio de Janeiro | individual pursuit B |
| Bronze medal – third place | 2018 Rio de Janeiro | Time trial B |
| Bronze medal – third place | 2019 Apeldoorn | Individual pursuit B |
| Bronze medal – third place | 2019 Apeldoorn | Time trial B |
Road World Championships
| Gold medal – first place | 2023 Glasgow | Time trial B |
| Gold medal – first place | 2024 Zurich | Time trial B |
| Gold medal – first place | 2024 Zurich | Road race B |
| Silver medal – second place | 2017 Pietermaritzburg | Road race B |
| Bronze medal – third place | 2021 Cascais | Road race B |

Patrick Bos (born 20 August 1987) is a Dutch cyclist who rides as a sighted pilot for blind or partially sighted athletes in tandem track and road events. He competed at the 2012, 2016, 2020 and 2024 Paralympic Games, having won four medals.

== Career ==
Along with Rinne Oost, Bos won the bronze medal in the men's 1 km time trial B event. At the 2019 UCI Para-cycling Track World Championships held in Apeldoorn, Netherlands, Tristan Bangma and Bos won the bronze medal in the men's time trial B event. Along with Stephen de Vries, Bos won the bronze medal at the 2016 Summer Paralympics.
