= Anaïs Vincent =

French para-cyclist (born 2000)

Personal information
- Nationality: French
- Born: 31 March 2000 (age 26) Montélimar, France

Sport
- Sport: Para-cycling
- Disability class: H3
Medal record
Representing France
Women's para-cycling
Road World Championships
Silver medal – second place	2025 Ronse	Time trial H3
Silver medal – second place	2025 Ronse	Road race H3
Bronze medal – third place	2023 Glasgow	Time trial H3
Bronze medal – third place	2023 Glasgow	Road race H3
Bronze medal – third place	2024 Zurich	Time trial H3
Bronze medal – third place	2024 Zurich	Road race H3
European Championships
Gold medal – first place	2023 Rotterdam	Mixed team relay H1–5
Bronze medal – third place	2023 Rotterdam	Time trial H3

Anaïs Vincent (born 31 March 2000) is a French Para-cyclist. She represented France at the 2024 Summer Paralympics.

== Career ==
Wibmer made her international debut for France in August 2023 at the 2023 UCI Para-cycling Road World Championships and won bronze medals in the road race and time trial H3 events. Weeks later she then competed at the 2023 European Para Championships in cycling and won a gold medal in the mixed team relay H1–5, along with Johan Quaile, and Joseph Fritsch, and a bronze medal in the time trial H3 event.

In September 2024, Wibmer represented France at the 2024 Summer Paralympics and finished in fifth place in both the road race H1–4 and time trial H1–3 events. Weeks later, she then competed at the 2024 UCI Para-cycling Road World Championships and won a bronze medal in the time trial H3 event.

== Personal life ==
On 6 March 2021, Vincent was pursuing a STAPS (Sciences and Techniques of Physical and Sports Activities) degree to become a teacher when she was involved in a cliff climbing accident near Lake Bourget. She fell 20 meters and landed on her back, damaging her C2 vertebrae and became a quadriplegic.
