= Davide Cortini =

Italian para-cyclist (born 1977)

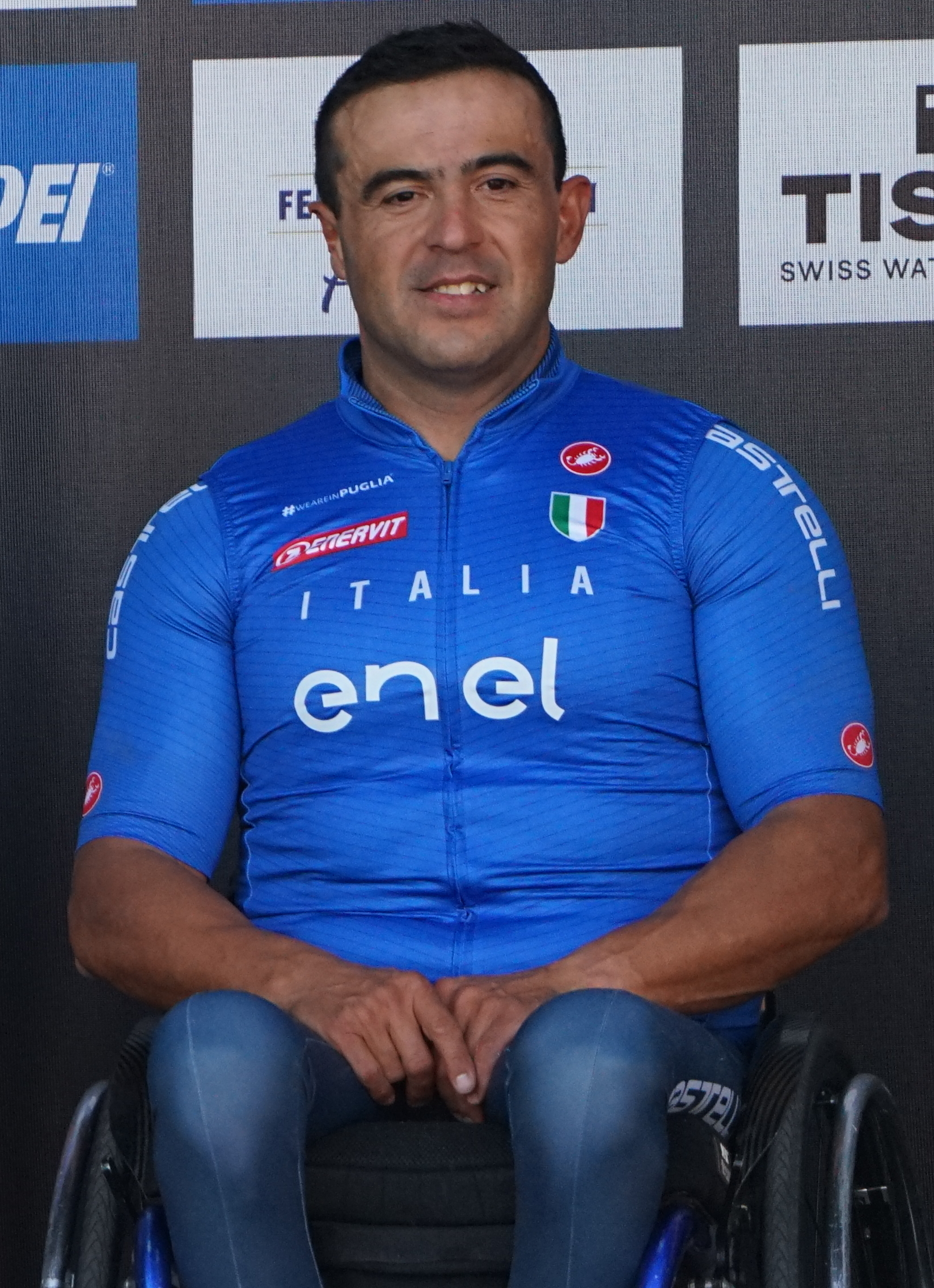
- Cortini at the 2024 UCI Para-cycling Road World Championships

Personal information
- Nationality: Italian
- Born: 18 December 1977 (age 48) Sassoleone, Italy

Sport
- Sport: Para-cycling
- Disability class: H3
Medal record
Men's Para-cycling
Representing Italy
Road World Championships
| Silver medal – second place | 2024 Zurich | Mixed team relay H1–5 |
| Bronze medal – third place | 2025 Ronse | Mixed team relay H1–5 |
European Championships
| Gold medal – first place | 2023 Rotterdam | Road race H3 |

Davide Cortini (born 18 December 1977) is an Italian para-cyclist.

== Career ==
In August 2023, Cortini competed at the 2023 European Para Championships and won a gold medal in the road race H3 event.

On September 18, 2024, he was selected to represent Italy at the 2024 UCI Para-cycling Road World Championships. He won a silver medal in the mixed team relay H1–5 event, along with Federico Mestroni and Luca Mazzone.
