= Mark Mekenkamp =

Dutch para-cyclist

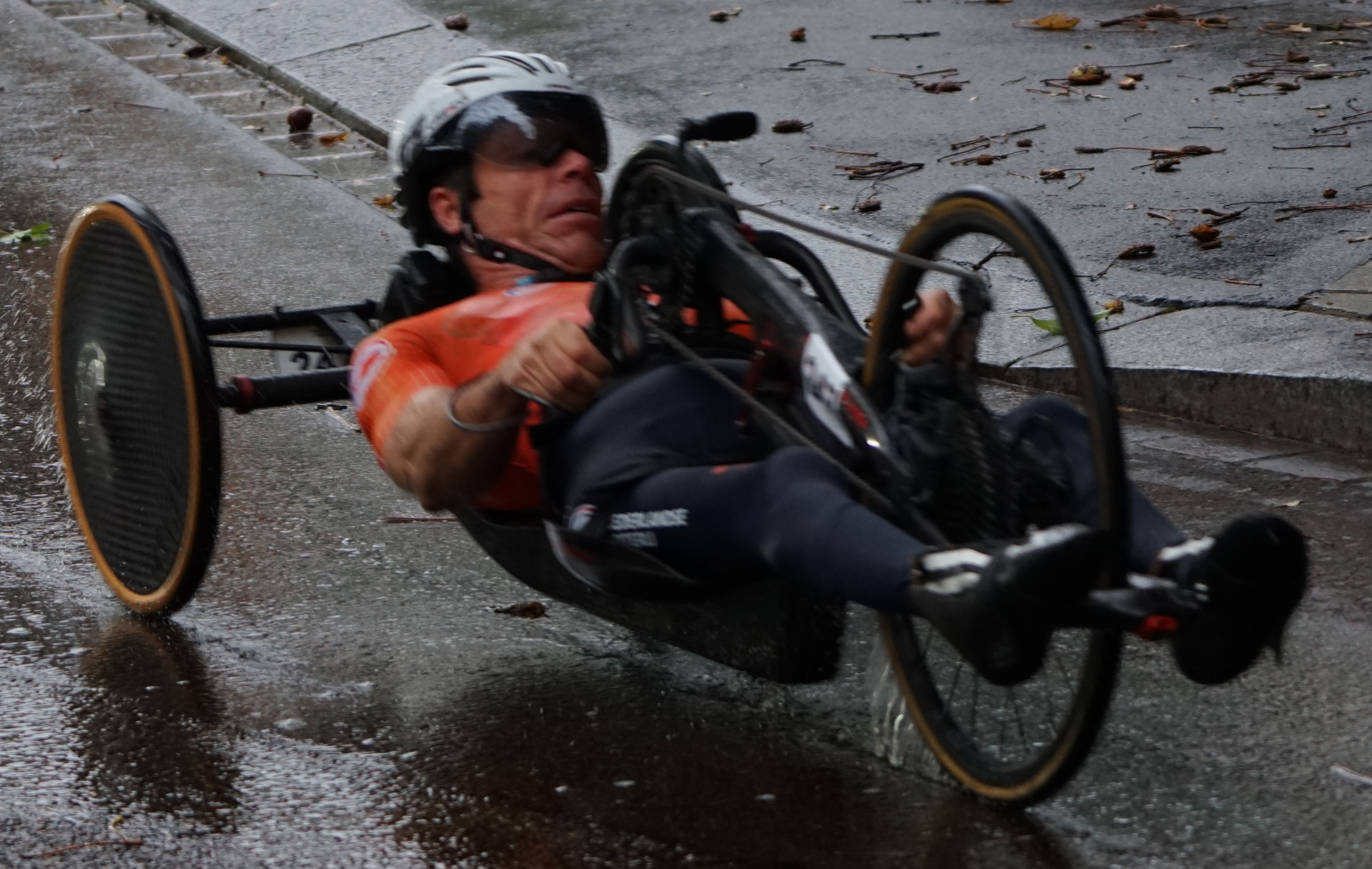
- Mekenkamp during the 2024 World Championships

Personal information
- Nationality: Dutch
- Born: 3 April 1973 (age 53)
- Home town: Saasveld, Netherlands

Sport
- Sport: Para-cycling
- Disability class: H3
Medal record
Representing Netherlands
Men's para-cycling
Road World Championships
Gold medal – first place	2023 Glasgow	Time trial H3
Silver medal – second place	2024 Zurich	Time trial H3
European Championships
Gold medal – first place	2023 Rotterdam	Time trial H3

Mark Mekenkamp (born 3 April 1973) is a Dutch para-cyclist who represented the Netherlands at the 2024 Summer Paralympics.

== Career ==
In August 2023, Mekenkamp competed at the 2023 UCI Para-cycling Road World Championships and won a gold medal in the time trial H3 event. Weeks later, he then competed at the 2023 European Para Championships and won a gold medal in the time trial H3 event.

Mekenkamp represented the Netherlands at the 2024 Summer Paralympics and finished in fifth place in the time trial H3 event, and eighth place in the road race H3 event. Weeks later, he then competed at the 2024 UCI Para-cycling Road World Championships and won a silver medal in the time trial H3 event.
