= Federico Mestroni =

Italian para-cyclist (born 1980)

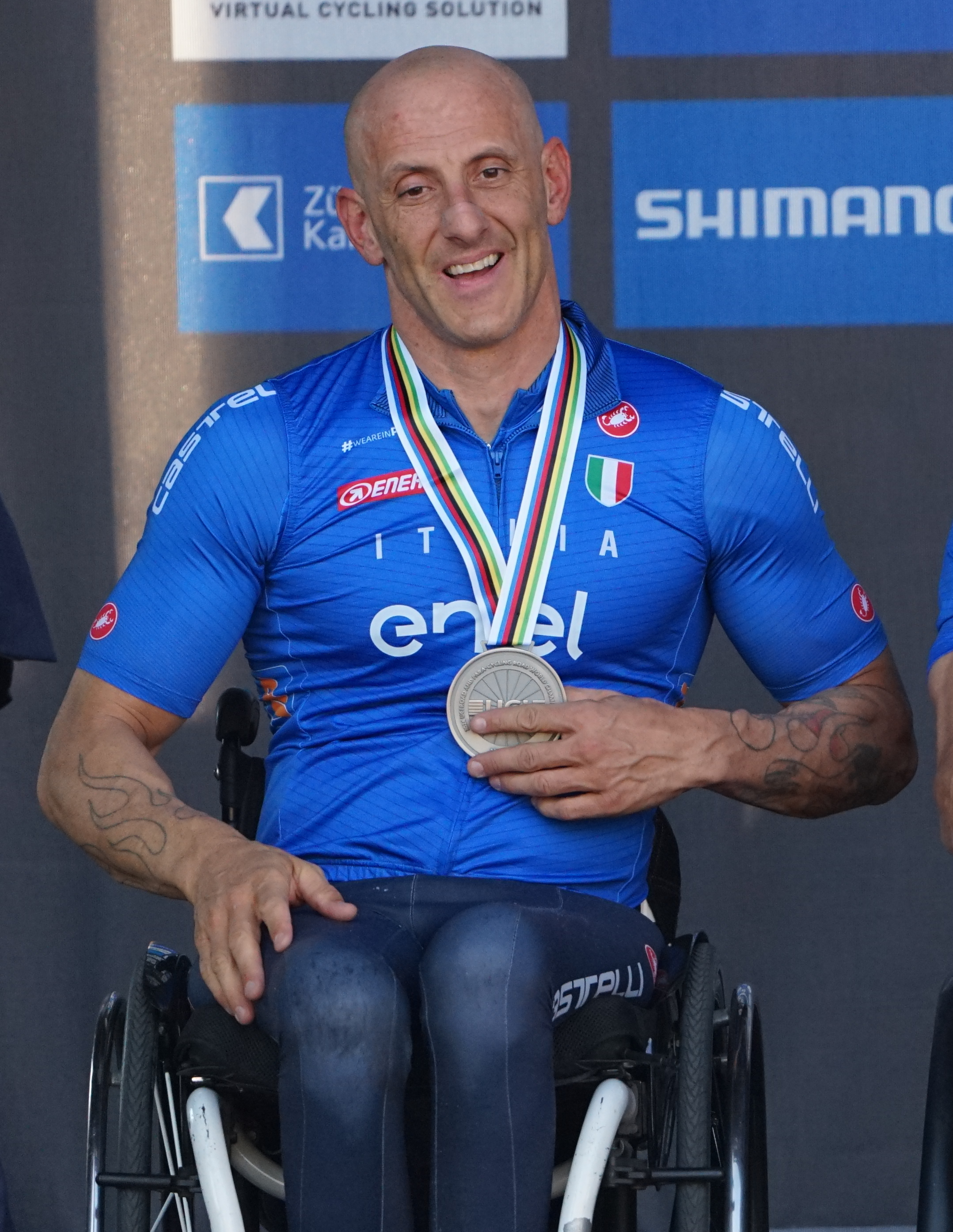
- Mestroni at the 2024 UCI Para-cycling Road World Championships

Personal information
- Nationality: Italian
- Born: 21 July 1980 (age 45) San Daniele del Friuli, Italy

Sport
- Sport: Para-cycling
- Disability class: H3
Medal record
Men's para-cycling
Representing Italy
Paralympic Games
Silver medal – second place	2024 Paris	Mixed team relay H1–5
Road World Championships
Gold medal – first place	2018 Maniago	Time trial H3
Silver medal – second place	2024 Zurich	Mixed team relay H1–5
Bronze medal – third place	2023 Glasgow	Time trial H3
European Championships
Silver medal – second place	2023 Rotterdam	Mixed team relay H1–5

Federico Mestroni (born 21 July 1980) is an Italian para-cyclist. He represented Italy at the 2024 Summer Paralympics.

== Career ==
Mestroni competed at the 2018 UCI Para-cycling Road World Championships and won a gold medal in the time trial H3 event.

Mestroni represented Italy at the 2024 Summer Paralympics and won a silver medal in the mixed team relay H1–5 event.

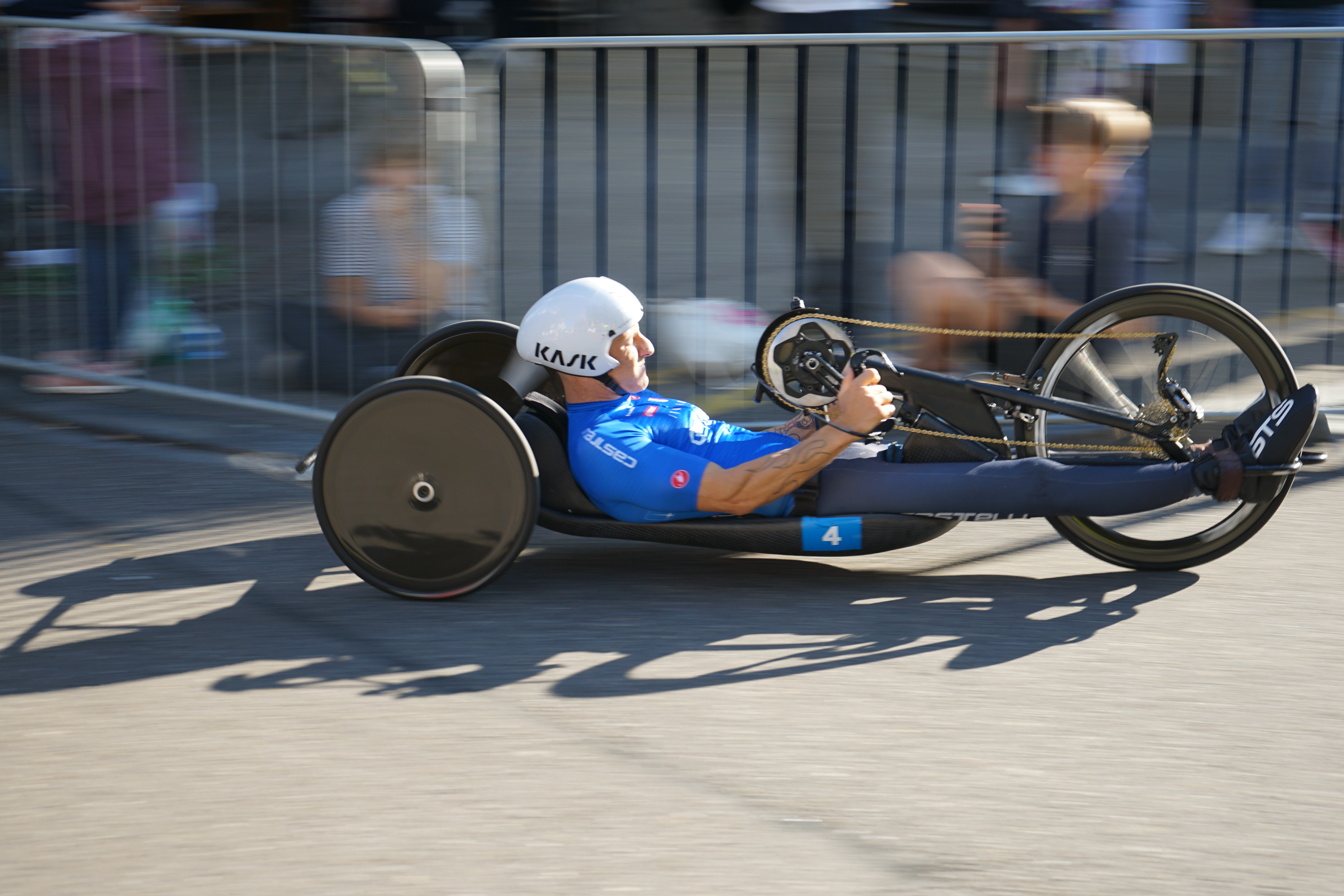
Mestroni during warm-up at the 2024 UCI Road World Championships
