= Florian Jouanny =

French para-cyclist (born 1992)

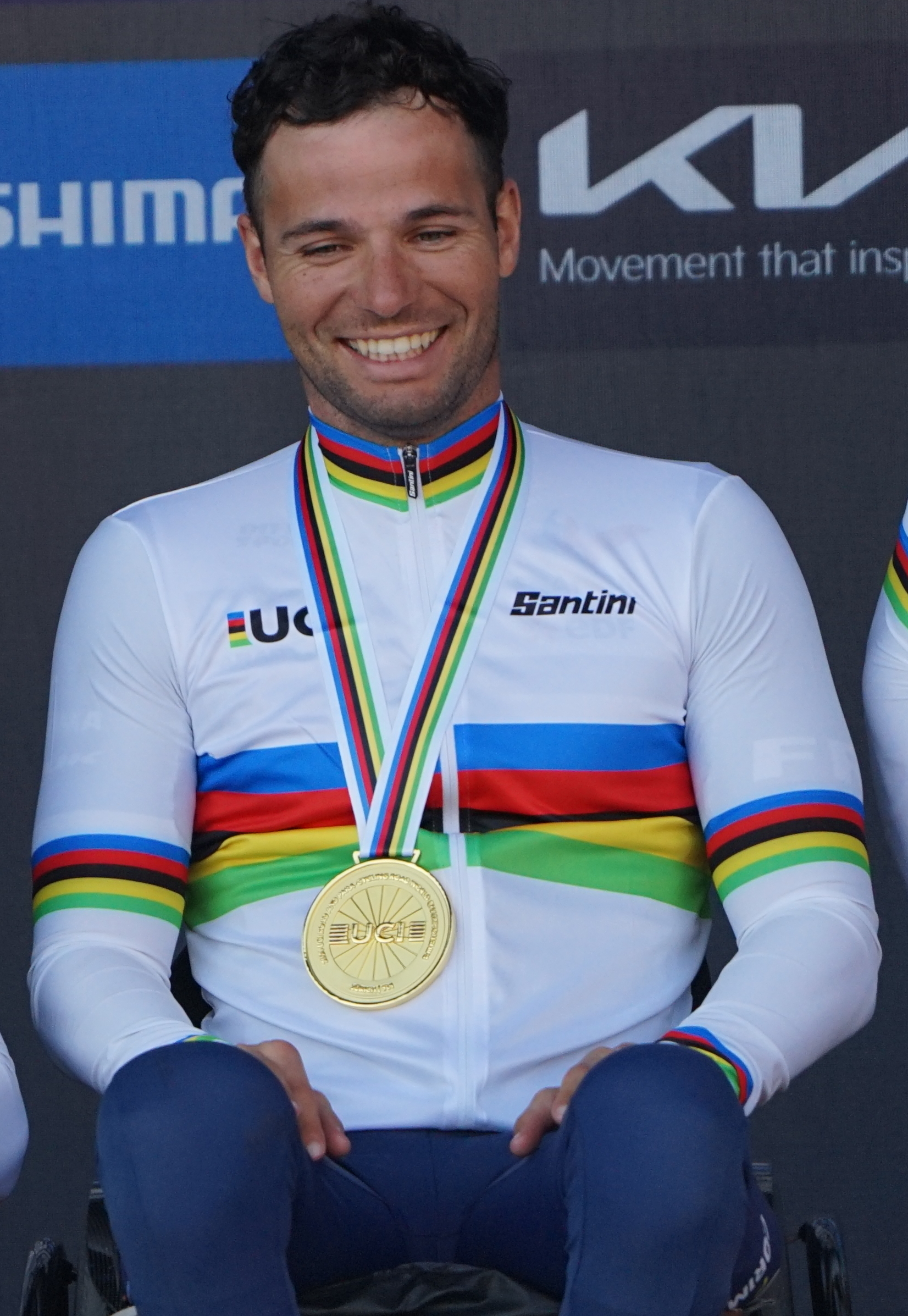
- Jouanny winning gold at the 2024 UCI Para-cycling Road World Championships

Personal information
- Nationality: French
- Born: 2 February 1992 (age 34) Échirolles, France

Sport
- Sport: Para-cycling
- Disability class: H2
Medal record
Event	1st	2nd	3rd
Paralympic Games	3	1	2
Road World Championships	6	4	2
European Para Championships	1	1	0
Total	10	6	4
Men's Para-cycling
Representing France
Paralympic Games
Gold medal – first place	2020 Tokyo	Road race H1-2
Gold medal – first place	2024 Paris	Road race H1–2
Gold medal – first place	2024 Paris	Mixed team relay H1–5
Silver medal – second place	2020 Tokyo	Mixed team relay H1-5
Bronze medal – third place	2020 Tokyo	Road time trial H2
Bronze medal – third place	2024 Paris	Road time trial H2
Road World Championships
Gold medal – first place	2022 Baie-Comeau	Road race H2
Gold medal – first place	2023 Glasgow	Road race H2
Gold medal – first place	2024 Zurich	Team relay H1–5
Gold medal – first place	2025 Ronse	Road race H2
Gold medal – first place	2025 Ronse	Time trial H2
Gold medal – first place	2025 Ronse	Mixed team relay H1–5
Silver medal – second place	2022 Baie-Comeau	Time trial H2
Silver medal – second place	2023 Glasgow	Time trial H2
Silver medal – second place	2024 Zurich	Road race H2
Silver medal – second place	2024 Zurich	Time trial H2
Bronze medal – third place	2021 Cascais	Road race H2
Bronze medal – third place	2021 Cascais	Time trial H2
European Championships
Gold medal – first place	2023 Rotterdam	Road race H2
Silver medal – second place	2023 Rotterdam	Time trial H2

Florian Jouanny (born 2 February 1992) is a French Para-cyclist who represented France at the 2020 and 2024 Summer Paralympics.

== Career ==
Jouanny represented France in the men's road time trial H2 event at the 2020 Summer Paralympics and won a gold medal in the H1-H2 road race, a silver medal in the mixed team relay H1–H5, and a bronze medal in the H2 time trial.

== Personal life ==
A skiing accident in 2011 resulted in quadriplegia.
