= Luisa Pasini =

Italian para-cyclist (born 1973)

Personal information
- Born: 25 February 1973 (age 53) Pavia, Italy

Cycling career
- Sport: Cycling
- Discipline: Road
- Role: Rider
Medal record
Representing Italy
Women's para-cycling
Road World Championships
Gold medal – first place	2023 Glasgow	Time trial H1
Gold medal – first place	2023 Glasgow	Road race H1
Gold medal – first place	2024 Zurich	Road race H1
Silver medal – second place	2024 Zurich	Time trial H1
European Championships
Gold medal – first place	2023 Rotterdam	Road race H1
Gold medal – first place	2023 Rotterdam	Time trial H1

Luisa Pasini (born 25 February 1973) is an Italian para-cyclist who competes in handcycling in the H1 classification. She is a four-time medalist at the Road World Championships and two-time medalist at the European Championships.

== Biography ==
Pasini was born on 25 February 1973 in Pavia. A nurse by profession, on 26 March 2013, she was involved in a car accident where she sustained a spinal cord injury.

== Career ==
In 2014, Pasini took up competitive handcycling. At the 2017 Road World Cup in Maniago, she won the gold medal in the time trial and road race events. At the 2023 UCI Para-cycling Road World Championships, she won the gold medal in the time trial and road race, finishing ahead of Darin Sheepchondan in both events. She also competed at the 2023 European Para Championships, winning a gold medal in each of these same events.

Pasini competed at the Road World Championships in September 2024 and won the silver medal in the time trial H1 event, finishing seven minutes behind Manuela Vos. She then won the gold medal in the road race in the same category, finishing ahead of Vos.
