= Cornelia Wibmer =

Austrian para-cyclist (born 1979)

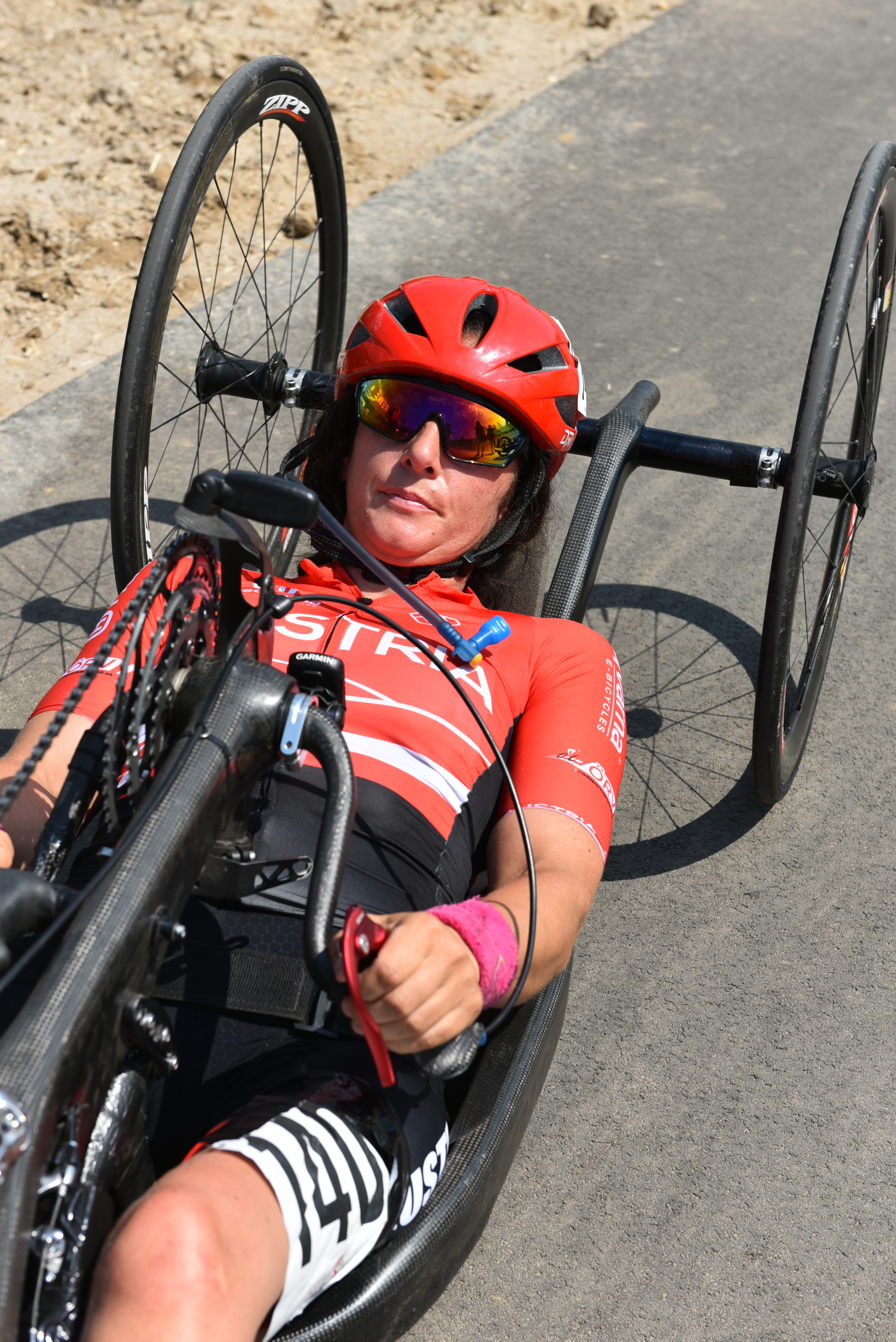
- Wibmer in 2022

Personal information
- Nickname: Conny
- Nationality: Austrian
- Born: 1 July 1979 (age 47) Wörgl, Austria

Sport
- Sport: Para-cycling
- Disability class: H4
Medal record
Women's para-cycling
Representing Austria
Road World Championships
Silver medal – second place	2024 Zurich	Time trial H4
Silver medal – second place	2024 Zurich	Road race H4
Bronze medal – third place	2025 Ronse	Time trial H4
European Championships
Bronze medal – third place	2023 Rotterdam	Time trial H4

Cornelia Wibmer (born 1 July 1979) is an Austrian Para-cyclist. She represented Austria at the 2024 Summer Paralympics.

== Career ==
Wibmer made her international debut for Austria at the 2022 UCI Para-cycling Road World Championships and finished in fourth place in the road race and time trial H4 events. She was subsequently named the Austrian female para-cyclist of the year in 2022.

In August 2023, she competed at the 2023 European Para Championships and won a bronze medal in the time trial H4 event.

In September 2024, Wibmer represented Austria at the 2024 Summer Paralympics and finished in 11th place in the road race H1–4 event and 13th place in the time trial H4–5 event. Weeks later, she then competed at the 2024 UCI Para-cycling Road World Championships and won a silver medal in the time trial H4 event.

== Personal life ==
Wibmer has been a paraplegic since an accident in 2001.
