= Katell Alençon =

French Paralympic cyclist

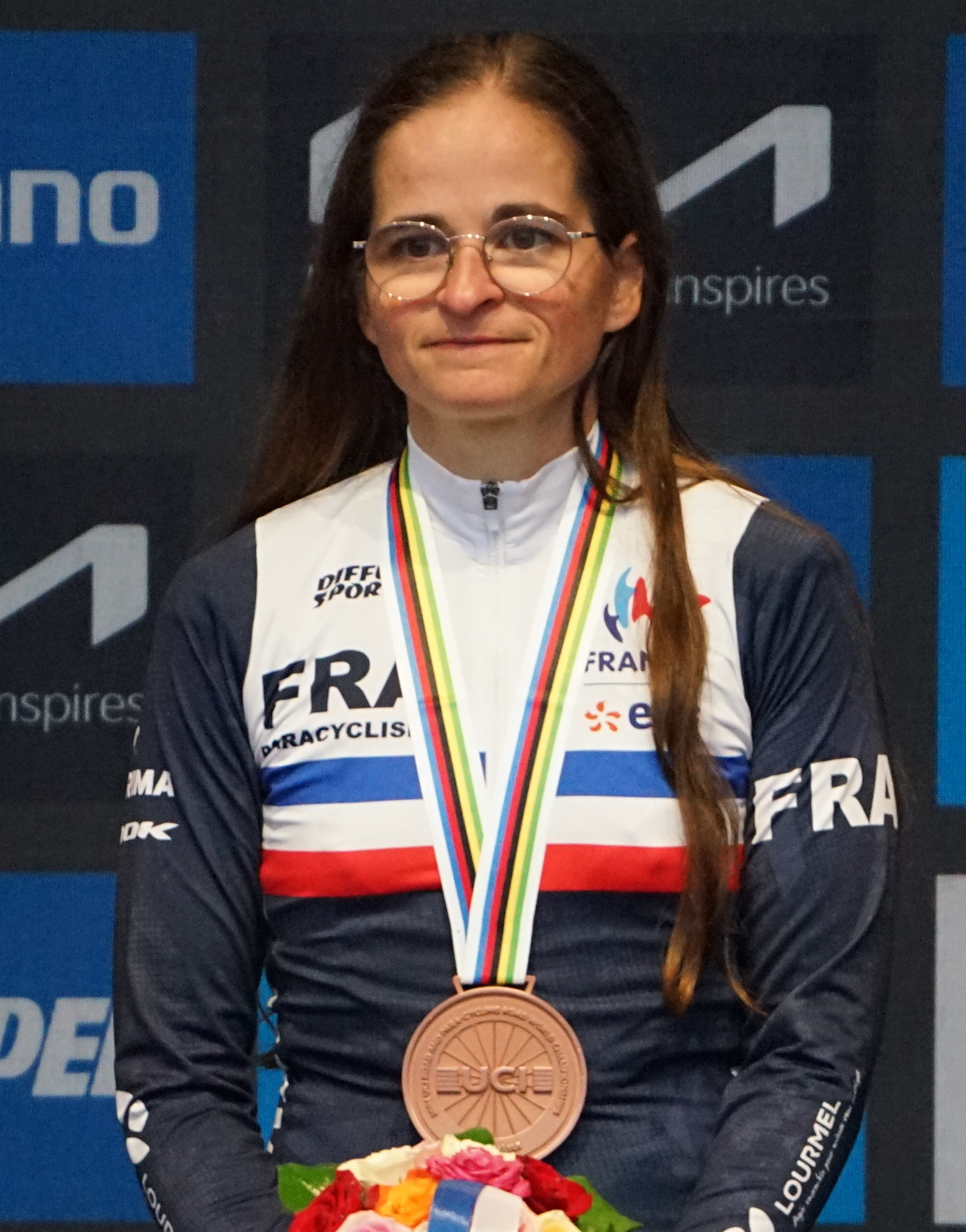
- Alençon at the 2024 World Championships

Personal information
- Born: 9 October 1986 (age 40) Brest, France
- Home town: Le Drennec, France

Sport
- Country: France
- Sport: Paralympic cycling
- Disability class: C4
- Event: Road cycling
- Club: Cofidis; Handisport Brest
Medal record
Cycling
Representing France
Road World Championships
Silver medal – second place	2021 Cascais	Time trial C4
Bronze medal – third place	2021 Cascais	Road race C4
Bronze medal – third place	2024 Zurich	Time trial C4
Bronze medal – third place	2024 Zurich	Road race C4
Track World Championships
Bronze medal – third place	2026 Apeldoorn	Elimination C1
European Para Championships
Silver medal – second place	2023 Rotterdam	Time trial C4
Silver medal – second place	2023 Rotterdam	Road race C4
European Road Championships
Gold medal – first place	2022 Upper Austria	Time trial C4
Gold medal – first place	2022 Upper Austria	Road race C4

Katell Alençon (born 9 October 1986) is a French Paralympic cyclist who competes in road cycling at international cycling competitions. She is a World silver medalist and a double European champion, she has competed at the 2016 and 2020 Summer Paralympics. She rides for Cofidis and Handisport Brest.

== Career ==
Alençon was interested in cycling at a young age, she would often cycle to school and joined her first cycling club in 2001. Aged 25, in 2011, Alençon fell off her bicycle while getting off her bike after a training session and badly sprained her ankle, she needed to use a wheelchair for five years. She had complications and extreme pain after her injury and had her right tibia amputated in 2011. She discovered Paralympic cycling while watching the cycling at the 2012 Summer Paralympics at home, she then began her Paralympic cycling career in 2014 and competed for France at the 2016 Summer Paralympics where she was the only French female cyclist out of a team of nine cyclists.
