= Roberta Amadeo =

Italian para-cyclist (born 1970)

Personal information
- Nationality: Italian
- Born: 12 February 1970 (age 56)

Sport
- Sport: Para-cycling
- Disability: Multiple sclerosis
- Disability class: H2
Medal record
Representing Italy
Women's para-cycling
Road World Championships
Gold medal – first place	2019 Emmen	Road race H2
Gold medal – first place	2019 Emmen	Time trial H2
Gold medal – first place	2021 Cascais	Road race H2
Gold medal – first place	2021 Cascais	Time trial H2
Gold medal – first place	2023 Glasgow	Road race H2
Gold medal – first place	2023 Glasgow	Time trial H2
Gold medal – first place	2025 Ronse	Road race H2
Gold medal – first place	2025 Ronse	Time trial H2
Silver medal – second place	2022 Baie-Comeau	Road race H2
Silver medal – second place	2022 Baie-Comeau	Time trial H2
Silver medal – second place	2024 Zurich	Road race H2
Silver medal – second place	2024 Zurich	Time trial H2
European Championships
Gold medal – first place	2023 Rotterdam	Road race H2
Gold medal – first place	2023 Rotterdam	Time trial H2

Roberta Amadeo (born 12 February 1970) is an Italian para-cyclist. She is a six-time gold medalist at the Road World Championships and two-time gold medalist at the European Championships.

== Career ==
At the 2019 UCI Para-cycling Road World Championships, Amadeo won gold medals in the road race and time trial H2 events. She again competed at the 2021 UCI Para-cycling Road World Championships and won gold medals in the road race and time trial.

In August 2023, she competed at the 2023 UCI Para-cycling Road World Championships and won gold medals in the road race and time trial. A week later, she then competed at the 2023 European Para Championships in cycling, winning a gold medal in each of these same events.

In September 2024, Amadeo competed at the 2024 UCI Para-cycling Road World Championships and won silver medals in the road race and time trial.

== Personal life ==
Amadeo has multiple sclerosis.
