= Wolfgang Steinbichler =

Austrian para-cyclist (born 1989)

Personal information
- Nationality: Austrian
- Born: 16 June 1989 (age 37) Vöcklabruck, Austria

Sport
- Sport: Para-cycling
- Disability class: T2
Medal record
Men's para-cycling
Representing Austria
Road World Championships
Silver medal – second place	2025 Ronse	Road race T2
Bronze medal – third place	2024 Zurich	Road race T2
Bronze medal – third place	2025 Ronse	Time trial T2
European Championships
Gold medal – first place	2023 Rotterdam	Road race T2
Silver medal – second place	2023 Rotterdam	Time trial T2

Wolfgang Steinbichler (born 16 June 1989) is an Austrian para-cyclist. He represented Austria at the 2024 Summer Paralympics.

== Career ==
In August 2023, Steinbichler represented Austria at the 2023 European Para Championships in cycling and won a gold medal in the road race T2 event, despite colliding with another racer and having a broken wheel. He also won a silver medal in the time trial T2 event.

In September 2024, Steinbichler represented Austria at the 2024 Summer Paralympics and finished in fifth place in the road race T1–2, and sixth place in the time trial T1–2. Weeks later, he then competed at the 2024 UCI Para-cycling Road World Championships and won a bronze medal in the road race T2 event, finishing three seconds behind gold medalist Dennis Connors.
