= Celine van Till =

Swiss para-athlete (born 1991)

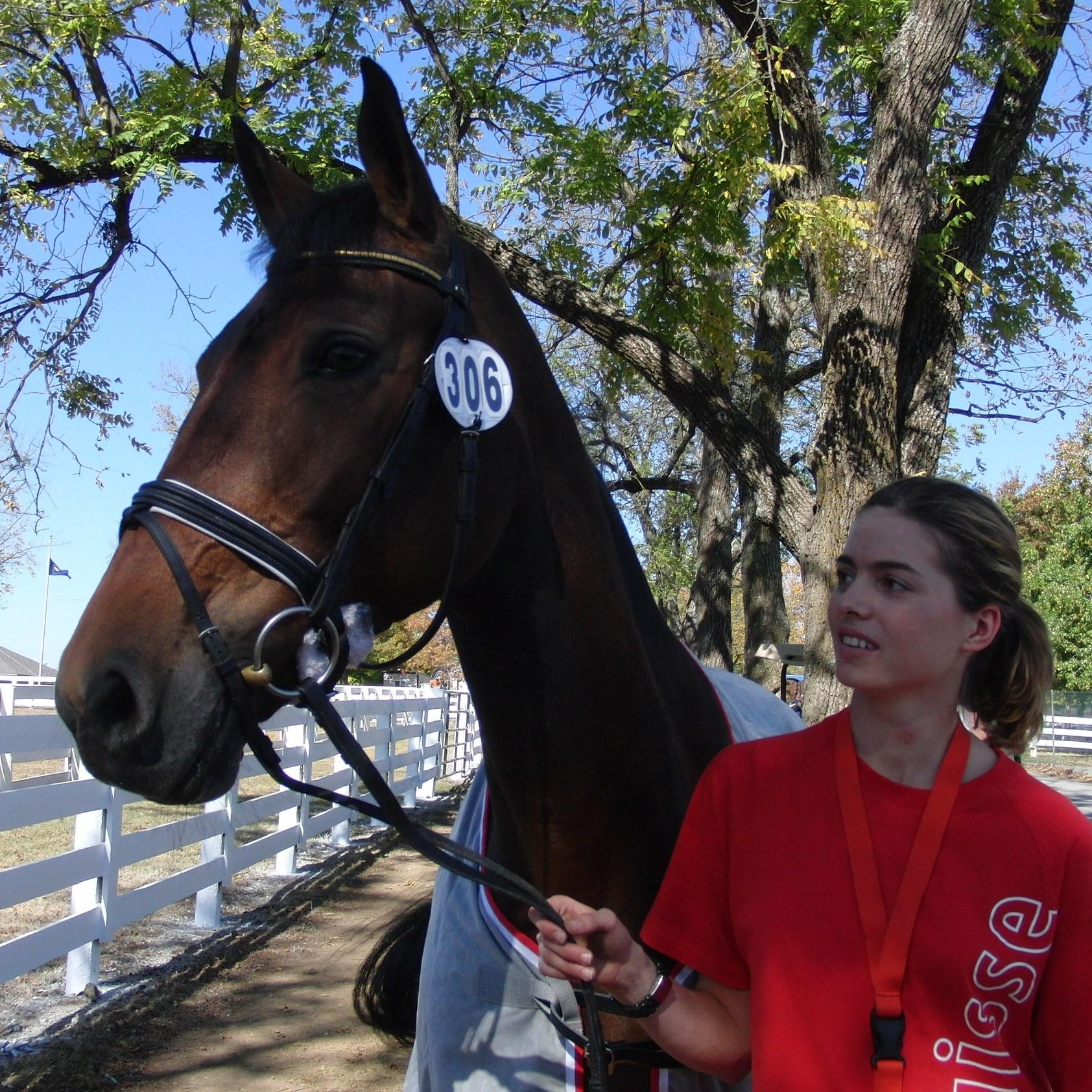
- van Till in 2010

Personal information
- Nationality: Swiss
- Born: 20 June 1991 (age 35) Geneva, Switzerland

Sport
- Sport: Para-equestrian; para-athletics; para-cycling
- Disability class: T2
Medal record
Women's Para-cycling
Representing Switzerland
Paralympic Games
Silver medal – second place	2024 Paris	Road time trial T1–2
Silver medal – second place	2024 Paris	Road race T1–2
Road World Championships
Gold medal – first place	2023 Glasgow	Time trial T2
Gold medal – first place	2024 Zurich	Time trial T2
Gold medal – first place	2025 Ronse	Time trial T2
Gold medal – first place	2025 Ronse	Road race T2
Silver medal – second place	2023 Glasgow	Road race T2
Silver medal – second place	2024 Zurich	Road race T2
European Championships
Gold medal – first place	2023 Rotterdam	Time trial T2
Gold medal – first place	2023 Rotterdam	Road race T2

Celine van Till (born 20 June 1991) is a Swiss para-athlete. She competed in the 2016 Paralympic Games in Rio de Janeiro as a para-dressage rider. In 2023, she became time trial world champion in the T2 category at the Para-cycling Road World Championships in Glasgow. Van Till is also an author, speaker and sits on the Grand Council of Geneva for The Liberals.

== Early life and injury ==
When she was 6 years old, van Till started horse riding. At 15, she finished 5th in the Swiss Junior Championships and was accepted into the junior national dressage team. In 2008, she suffered a serious riding accident during training in Germany. Her horse reared up, fell, and buried van Till under it. She was in a coma for a month with a severe traumatic brain injury. She had to learn everything again: speaking, eating, walking. In the months she spent in hospital, she fell into a deep depression. She tried to take her own life twice.

Van Till got back on her feet and gradually found her way in her new life. Impairments remained: her left field of vision is restricted, her vision is double and two-dimensional, her coordination and balance are impaired. Her mother had encouraged her to ride again.

== Sporting career ==
In 2010, van Till competed in international competitions again. At the World Championships in Kentucky, she came 4th (freestyle) and 6th (individual) in para-dressage. In 2014, she competed in the World Championships again, and a year later she also competed in the European Championships. In 2016, she fulfilled a big dream: she took part in the Paralympics in Rio. A year later, she competed again in the European Championships, but soon she turned to a new sport.

In 2018, van Till started para-athletics. As a sprinter, she qualified for the 2020 Summer Paralympics. But in 2021, she fell on her head at a meeting in Tunis. For months, she was again plagued by severe headaches and dizziness. She decided to put an end to her sporting career.

However, van Till couldn't get away from it. She took part in some fun runs and the Geneva triathlon. For this, she looked for a bicycle. Van Till got on a Paralympic racing bike with three wheels. In 2022, she announced her return to the sport and won gold in the individual time trial and road race at the European Championships.

At the 2023 Para-cycling Road World Championships in Glasgow, she became world champion in the time trial and won a silver medal in the road race. A week later, she was crowned European champion in both disciplines at the European Championships in Rotterdam.

== Political career ==
In 2021, van Till also began her political career. She was a board member of the Geneva branch of The Liberals for two years before being elected to the Grand Council in April 2023.

== Personal life ==
Van Till has written two books about her way back to life. "Pas à Pas. Historie d'un accident et d'une résurrection" and "Tout est possible. D'une situation de l'autre" was published in 2011 and 2021 respectively. In 2017, the film "Bucéphale" was released, which also tells her story. It won several awards. She is an ambassador for people with disabilities. In 2017, she founded the "Tout est possible" foundation, which supports disabled athletes.

Van Till has a bachelor's degree in marketing and also works as a speaker.
