= Pavlína Vejvodová =

Czech para-cyclist (born 1989)

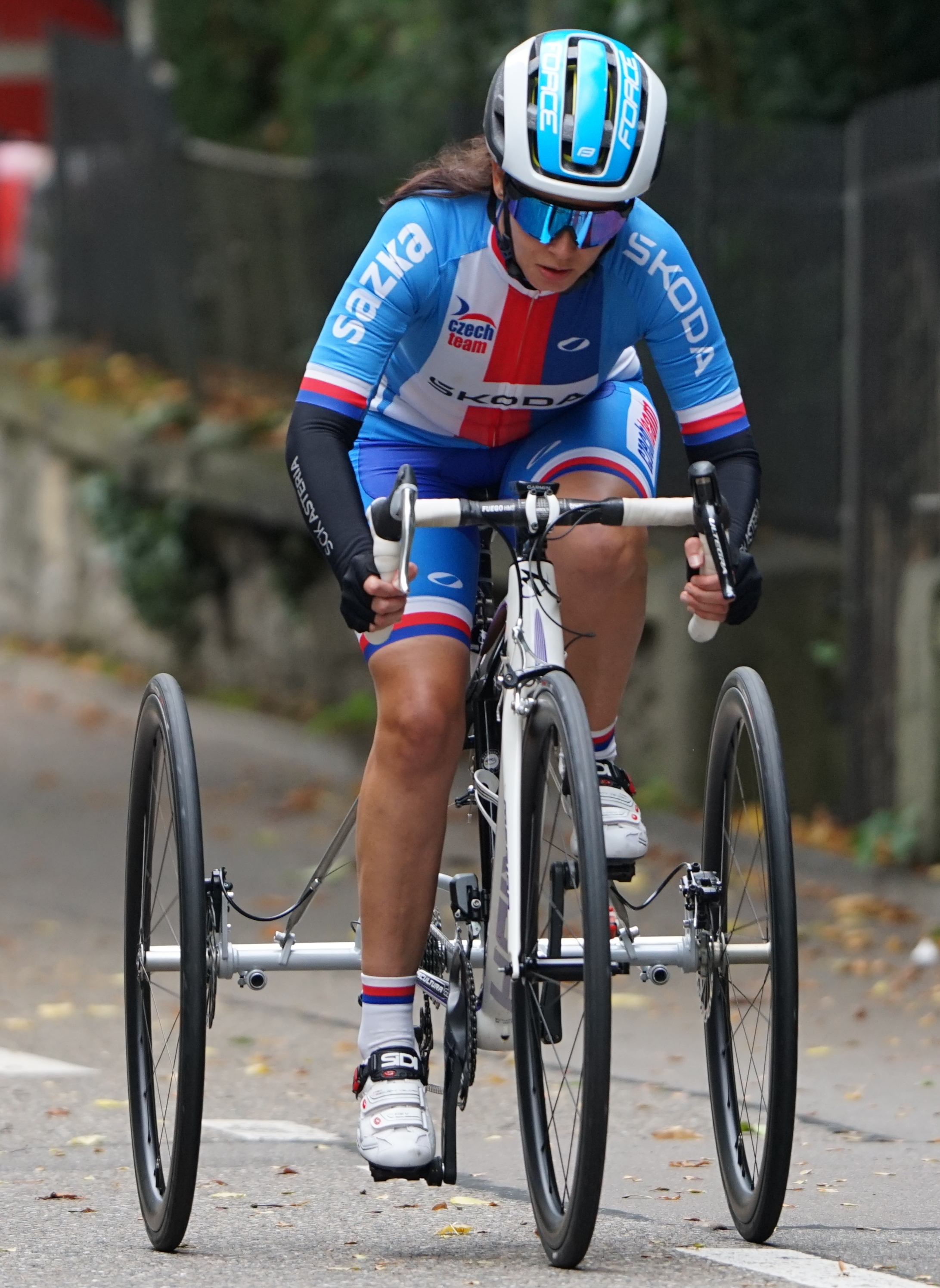
- Vejvodová during the 2024 Road World Championships

Personal information
- Nationality: Czech
- Born: 1 June 1989 (age 37)

Sport
- Sport: Para-cycling
- Disability class: T1
Medal record
Representing Czech Republic
Women's para-cycling
Road World Championships
Gold medal – first place	2023 Glasgow	Road race T1
Gold medal – first place	2023 Glasgow	Time trial T1
Silver medal – second place	2024 Zurich	Road race T1
Silver medal – second place	2024 Zurich	Time trial T1
Bronze medal – third place	2025 Ronse	Road race T1
Bronze medal – third place	2025 Ronse	Time trial T1
European Championships
Gold medal – first place	2023 Rotterdam	Road race T1
Gold medal – first place	2023 Rotterdam	Time trial T1

Pavlína Vejvodová (born 1 June 1989) is a Czech para-cyclist. She represented the Czech Republic at the 2024 Summer Paralympics.

== Career ==
Vejvodová made her international debut for the Czech Republic at the 2023 UCI Para-cycling Road World Championships in August 2023 and won gold medals in the road race and time trial T1 events. A week later, she competed at the 2023 European Para Championships in cycling and won gold medals in the road race and time trial.

In September 2024, Vejvodová represented the Czech Republic at the 2024 Summer Paralympics and finished in fourth place in the time trial T1–2 event and fifth place in the road race T1–2 event. Weeks later, she then competed at the 2024 UCI Para-cycling Road World Championships and won silver medals in the road race and time trial T1 events.
