= Cycling at the 2023 European Para Championships =

- Location: Rotterdam, Netherlands
- Start date: 17 August
- End date: 20 August

Cycling at the 2023 European Para Championships in Rotterdam, Netherlands, will be held between 17 and 20 August 2023.

The championships will be road cycling only. There will be five men and women's events in time trial and road races and one mixed team relay event.

== Rank ==
* Host nation (Netherlands)

Rank	Nation	Gold	Silver	Bronze	Total
1	Italy	14	9	10	33
2	France	10	7	6	23
3	Netherlands*	7	8	4	19
4	Germany	5	8	2	15
5	Spain	5	5	4	14
6	Switzerland	4	1	1	6
7	Austria	2	3	6	11
8	Poland	2	2	1	5
9	Czech Republic	2	1	5	8
10	Greece	0	2	0	2
11	Portugal	0	1	1	2
11	Slovakia	0	1	1	2
13	Norway	0	1	0	1
14	Denmark	0	0	2	2
Totals (14 entries)		51	49	43	143

- 2 silver and 8 bronze not awarded.

== Medalists ==
=== Men (26) ===
Event	Gold	Silver	Bronze
Men's time trial B	Tristan Bangma; Netherlands	Vincent ter Schure; Netherlands	Christian Venge Balboa; Spain
Men's time trial T1	Giorgio Farroni; Italy	Gonzalo García Abella; Spain	Petr Berger; Czech Republic
Men's time trial T2	Joan Reinoso Figuerola; Spain	Wolfgang Steinbichler; Austria	Jindřich Mašín; Czech Republic
Men's time trial C1	Ricardo Ten Argilés; Spain	Bernardo Vieira; Portugal	Andreas Zirkl; Austria
Men's time trial C2	Alexandre Léauté; France	Nikolaos Papangelis; Greece	Maurice Far Eckhard Tió; Spain
Men's time trial C3	Matthias Schindler; Germany	Eduardo Santas Asensio; Spain	Thomas Peyroton-Dartet; France
Men's time trial C4	Gatien Le Rousseau; France	Timothy Zemp; Switzerland	Damian Ramos Sanchez; Spain
Men's time trial C5	Dorian Foulon; France	Daniel Abraham Gebru; Netherlands	Martin van de Pol; Netherlands
Men's time trial H1	Fabrizio Cornegliani; Italy	Patrik Jahoda; Czech Republic	Benjamin Früh; Switzerland
Men's time trial H2	Sergio Garrote Muñoz; Spain	Florian Jouanny; France	Luca Mazzone; Italy
Men's time trial H3	Mark Mekenkamp; Netherlands	Johan Quaile; France	Mischa Hielkema; Netherlands
Men's time trial H4	Thomas Frühwirth; Austria	Alexander Gritsch; Austria	Mathieu Bosredon; France
Men's time trial H5	Mitch Valize; Netherlands	Loïc Vergnaud; France	Tim de Vries; Netherlands
Men's road race B	Tristan Bangma; Netherlands	Vincent ter Schure; Netherlands	Fabio Colombo; Italy
Men's road race T1	Giorgio Farroni; Italy	Gonzalo García Abella; Spain	Petr Berger; Czech Republic
Men's road race T2	Wolfgang Steinbichler; Austria	Joan Reinoso; Spain	Jindřich Mašín; Czech Republic
Men's road race C1	Ricardo Ten Argilés; Spain	Michael Teuber; Germany	Bernardo Vieira; Portugal
Men's road race C2	Alexandre Léauté; France	Nikolaos Papangelis; Greece	Maurice Far Eckhard Tió; Spain
Men's road race C3	Thomas Peyroton-Dartet; France	Hidde Buur; Netherlands	Valentin Sicot; France
Men's road race C4	Damian Ramos Sanchez; Spain	Patrik Kuril; Slovakia	Gatien Le Rousseau; France
Men's road race C5	Daniel Abraham Gebru; Netherlands	Martin van de Pol; Netherlands	Franz-Josef Lässer; Austria
Men's road race H1	Fabrizio Cornegliani; Italy	Ernst Bachmaier; Austria	Patrik Jahoda; Czech Republic
Men's road race H2	Florian Jouanny; France	Sergio Garrote Muñoz; Spain	Luca Mazzone; Italy
Men's road race H3	Davide Cortini; Italy	Vico Merklein; Germany	Mirko Testa; Italy
Men's road race H4	Mathieu Bosredon; France	Joseph Fritsch; France	Thomas Frühwirth; Austria
Men's road race H5	Tim de Vries; Netherlands	Mitch Valize; Netherlands	Loïc Vergnaud; France

=== Women (24) ===
Event	Gold	Silver	Bronze
Women's time trial B	Patrycja Kuter; Poland	Otylia Marczuk; Poland	Marianna Agostini; Italy
Women's time trial T1	Pavlína Vejvodová; Czech Republic	None awarded	None awarded
Women's time trial T2	Celine van Till; Switzerland	Angelika Dreock-Käser; Germany	Emma Lund; Denmark
Women's time trial C2	Flurina Rigling; Switzerland	Maike Hausberger; Germany	Yvonne Marzinke; Austria
Women's time trial C3	Antonella Incristi; Italy	Aniek van den Aarssen; Netherlands	None awarded
Women's time trial C4	Franziska Matile-Dörig; Germany	Katell Alençon; France	None awarded
Women's time trial C5	Heïdi Gaugain; France	Kerstin Brachtendorf; Germany	Claudia Cretti; Italy
Women's time trial H1	Luisa Pasini; Italy	Veronica Frosi; Italy	None awarded
Women's time trial H2	Roberta Amadeo; Italy	Angela Procida; Italy	Simona Canipari; Italy
Women's time trial H3	Annika Zeyen; Germany	Francesca Porcellato; Italy	Anaïs Vincent; France
Women's time trial H4	Jennette Jansen; Netherlands	Giulia Ruffato; Italy	Cornelia Wibmer; Austria
Women's time trial H5	Andrea Eskau; Germany	Ana Maria Vitelaru; Italy	Katia Aere; Italy
Women's road race B	Justyna Kiryła; Poland	Katarzyna Orzechowska; Poland	Otylia Marczuk; Poland
Women's road race T1	Pavlína Vejvodová; Czech Republic	None awarded	None awarded
Women's road race T2	Celine van Till; Switzerland	Angelika Dreock-Käser; Germany	Emma Lund; Denmark
Women's road race C2	Flurina Rigling; Switzerland	Christelle Ribault; France	Yvonne Marzinke; Austria
Women's road race C3	Antonella Incristi; Italy	Aniek van den Aarssen; Netherlands	None awarded
Women's road race C4	Franziska Matile-Dörig; Germany	Katell Alençon; France	None awarded
Women's road race C5	Heïdi Gaugain; France	Claudia Cretti; Italy	Kerstin Brachtendorf; Germany
Women's road race H1	Luisa Pasini; Italy	Veronica Frosi; Italy	None awarded
Women's road race H2	Roberta Amadeo; Italy	Simona Canipari; Italy	Angela Procida; Italy
Women's road race H3	Francesca Porcellato; Italy	Annika Zeyen; Germany	Anna Oroszová; Slovakia
Women's road race H4	Giulia Ruffato; Italy	Suzanna Tangen; Norway	Jennette Jansen; Netherlands
Women's road race H5	Ana Maria Vitelaru; Italy	Andrea Eskau; Germany	Katia Aere; Italy

=== Mixed (1) ===
Event	Gold	Silver	Bronze
Mixed team relay H1-H5	France; Johan Quaile; Anaïs Vincent; Joseph Fritsch	Italy; Federico Mestroni; Francesca Porcellato; Diego Colombari	Germany; Vico Merklein; Annika Zeyen; Andrea Eskau

== See also ==
- Cycling at the 2023 European Games
