= Marianna Agostini =

Italian para-cyclist (born 2002)

Personal information
- Nationality: Italian
- Born: Campodarsego, Italy

Sport
- Sport: Para-cycling
- Disability: Vision impairment
- Disability class: B
Medal record
Women's para-cycling
Representing Italy
Track World Championships
| Silver medal – second place | 2025 Rio de Janeiro | Mixed team sprint B |
European Championships
| Bronze medal – third place | 2023 Rotterdam | Time trial B |

Marianna Agostini is an Italian visually impaired para-cyclist who competes in road and track events.

== Career ==
Agostini began her career in para-athletics. She competed at the European Para Youth Games in 2017 and won a silver medal in the 100 metres with a time of 15.58 seconds. She again competed at the European Para Youth Games in 2019 and won a gold medal in the 100 metres with a time of 13.72 seconds. She underwent an eye surgery in 2020. When running, the impact with the ground caused severe pain in her eyes, and as a result she had to retire from athletics.

She then switched to para-cycling. She competed at the 2023 European Para Championships and won a bronze medal in the time trial B event. In August 2025, she competed at the 2025 UCI Para-cycling Road World Championships and finished in fourth place in the road race B event with a time of 2:06.48. In October 2025, she competed at the 2025 UCI Para-cycling Track World Championships and won a silver medal in the mixed team sprint B event with a time of 49.975.

== Personal life ==
Agostini contracted Uveitis at two and a half years old.
