= Joseph Fritsch =

French para-cyclist (born 1998)

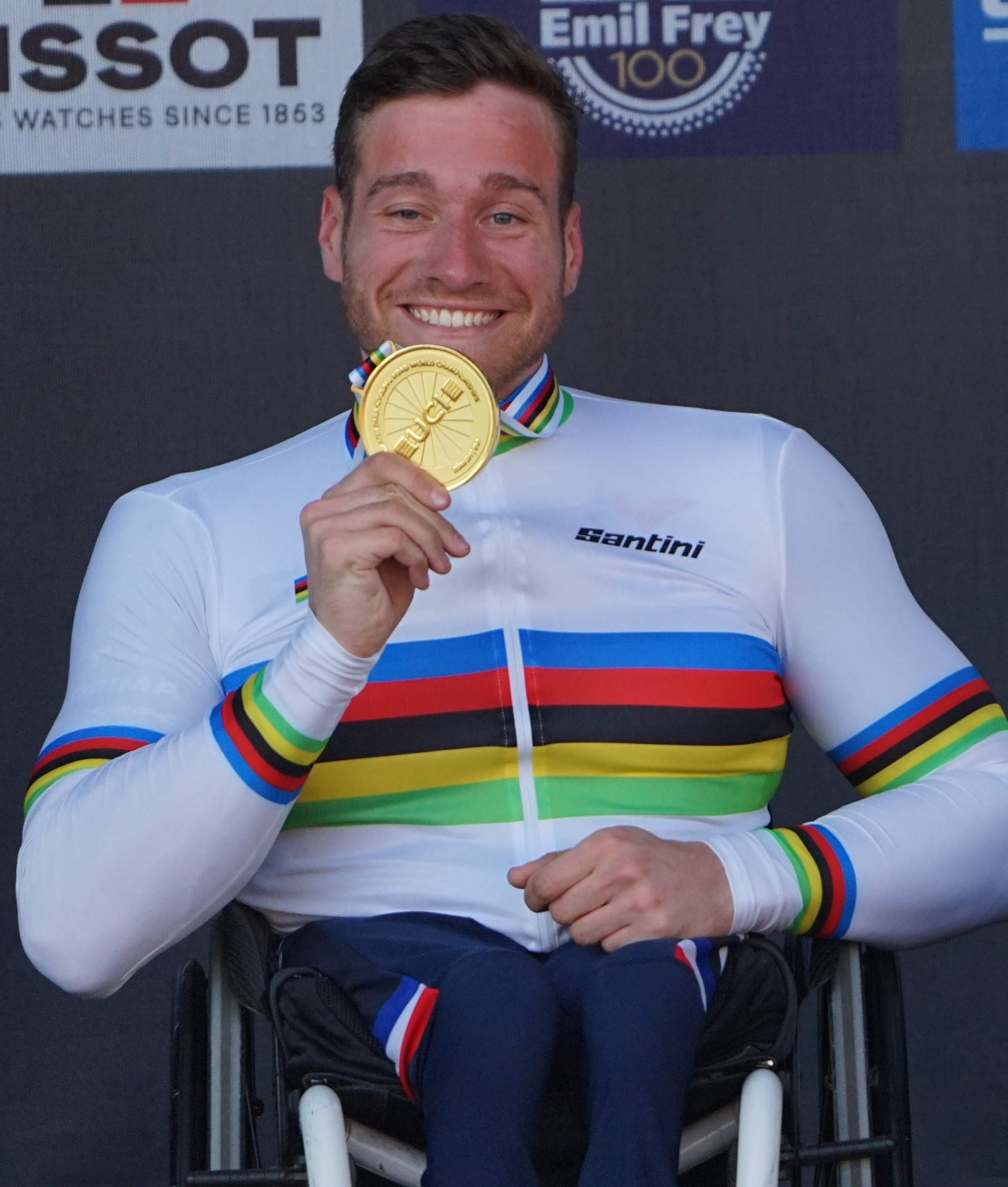
- Fritsch winning gold at the 2024 UCI Para-cycling Road World Championships

Personal information
- Nationality: French
- Born: 28 May 1998 (age 28) Quimper, France

Sport
- Sport: Para-cycling
- Disability class: H4
Medal record
Representing France
Men's Para-cycling
Paralympic Games
Gold medal – first place	2024 Paris	Mixed team relay H1–5
Road World Championships
Gold medal – first place	2023 Glasgow	Mixed team relay H1–5
Gold medal – first place	2024 Zurich	Road race H4
Gold medal – first place	2024 Zurich	Mixed team relay H1–5
Gold medal – first place	2025 Ronse	Road race H4
Gold medal – first place	2025 Ronse	Mixed team relay H1–5
Bronze medal – third place	2023 Glasgow	Time trial H4
Bronze medal – third place	2024 Zurich	Time trial H4
European Championships
Gold medal – first place	2023 Rotterdam	Mixed team relay H1–5
Silver medal – second place	2023 Rotterdam	Road race H4
Men's paratriathlon
World Championships
Bronze medal – third place	2026 Pontevedra	PTWC

Joseph Fritsch (born 28 May 1998) is a French Para-cyclist. He represented France at the 2024 Summer Paralympics.

== Career ==
In August 2023, Fritsch competed at the 2023 UCI Para-cycling Road World Championships and won a gold medal in the mixed team relay H1–5 event. Less than a week later he then competed at 2023 European Para Championships and won a gold medal in the mixed team relay H1–5 event.

Fritsch represented France at the 2024 Summer Paralympics and won a gold medal in the mixed team relay H1–5 event.
