= Cycling at the 2024 Summer Paralympics – Women's road race H1–4 =

Women's road race H1-4 at the XVII Paralympic Games
- Dates: 5 September
- Competitors: 16 from 12 nations
- Winning time: 52:04

Medalists
1st place, gold medalist(s)		Lauren Parker	Australia
2nd place, silver medalist(s)		Jennette Jansen	Netherlands
3rd place, bronze medalist(s)		Annika Zeyen-Giles	Germany

The women's road race H1-4 cycling event at the 2024 Summer Paralympics took place on 5 September 2024. 16 riders competed in the event.

== Schedule ==
F	Finals

Women's Road Race
Event↓/Date →	5 September	6 September	7 September
B		F	
H1-4	F		
H5	F		
C1-3			F
C4-5		F	
T1-2			F

== Results ==
This race covered four classifications, from H1 to H4. However, it was not a factored event.

Rank	Rider	Nationality	Class	Time	Deficit
1st place, gold medalist(s)	Lauren Parker	Australia	H4	52:04	
2nd place, silver medalist(s)	Jennette Jansen	Netherlands	H4	56:15	+04:11
3rd place, bronze medalist(s)	Annika Zeyen-Giles	Germany	H3	56:15	+04:11
4	Francesca Porcellato	Italy	H3	56:19	+04:15
5	Anaïs Vincent	France	H3	56:23	+04:19
6	Jady Malavazzi	Brazil	H3	56:52	+04:48
7	Svetlana Moshkovich	Austria	H4	56:57	+04:53
8	Sandra Stöckli	Switzerland	H4	58:57	+06:53
9	Suzanna Tangen	Norway	H4	59:35	+07:31
10	Lee Do-yeon	South Korea	H4	59:44	+07:40
11	Cornelia Wibmer	Austria	H4	1:00:12	+08:08
12	Giulia Ruffato	Italy	H4	1:00:34	+08:30
13	Katerina Antosova	Czech Republic	H3	1:06:20	+14:16
14	Mariana Garcia	Brazil	H3	1:09:54	+17:50
15	Naphatsakorn Rodklang	Thailand	H3	1:30:40	+38:36
	Katerina Brim	United States	H2	DNS	
