= Annika Zeyen =

German Paracyclist and former wheelchair basketball player

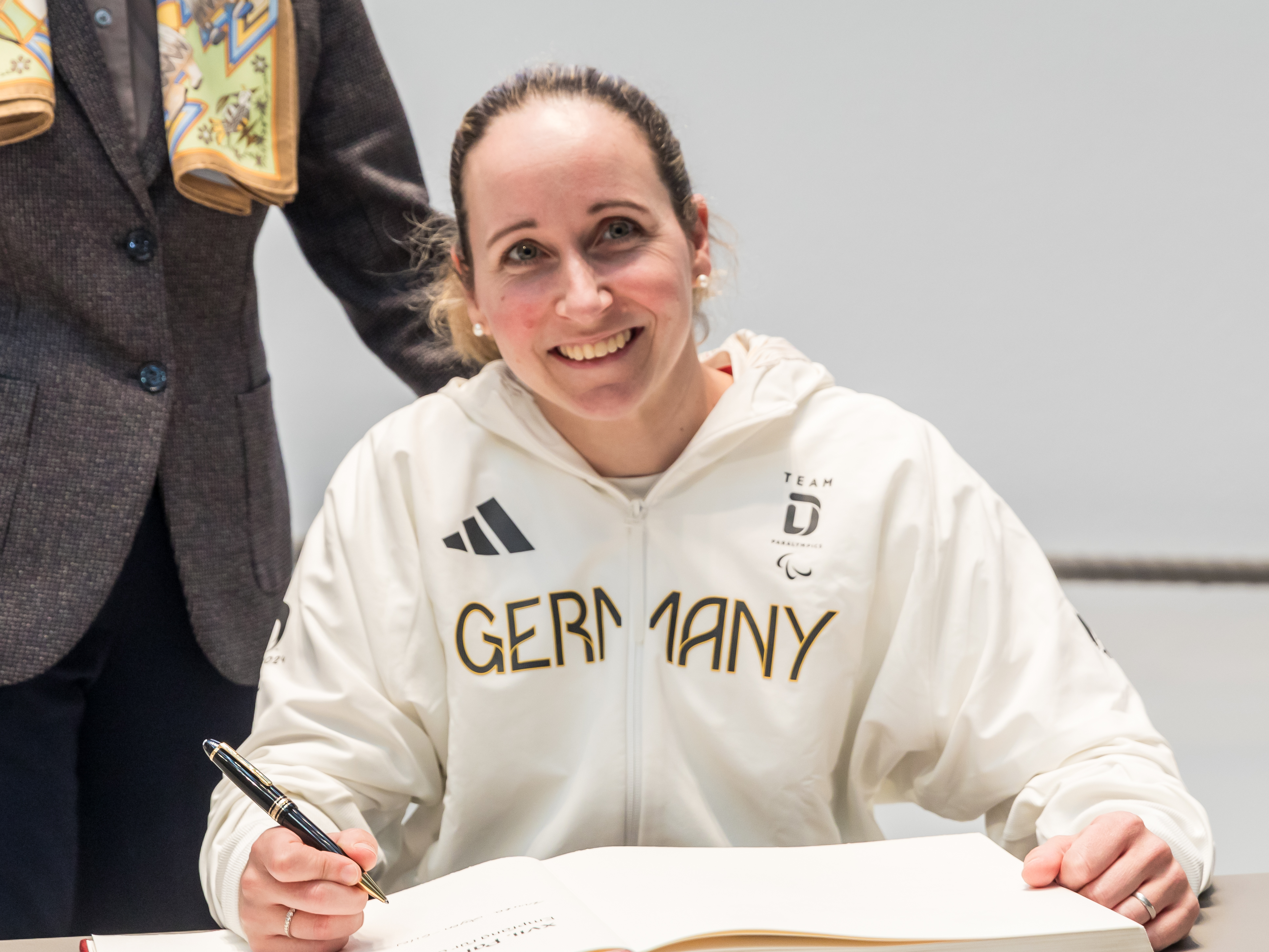
- Annika Zeyen-Giles – German Paracyclist and former wheelchair basketball player

Personal information
- Nickname: Anni
- Born: 17 February 1985 (age 41)

Sport
- Country: Germany
- Sport: Wheelchair basketball (1999–2016) Wheelchair racing (2016–2019) Paracycling (2019–present)
- Disability class: Wheelchair basketball 1.5; Wheelchair racing T54; Paracycling H3
- Event: Women's team
- College team: University of Alabama
- Coached by: Wheelchair Basketball; Brent Hardin – University of Alabama; Holger Glinicki German National Team/ BG Baskets Hamburg; Wheelchair Racing; Alois Gmeiner; Paracycling; Alois Gmeiner; Oliver J Quittmann

Achievements and titles
- Paralympic finals: 2008 Paralympics, 2012 Paralympics, 2016 Paralympics
- Personal bests: 800 m: 1:52.63 (2017, Nottwil, Switzerland NR); 1500 m: 3:28.64 (2017, Arbon, Switzerland NR); 5000 m: 12:10.31 (2018, Nottwil, Switzerland NR)
Medal record
Wheelchair basketball
Paralympic Games
Silver medal – second place	2016 Rio de Janeiro	Team
Gold medal – first place	2012 London	Team
Silver medal – second place	2008 Beijing	Team
IWBF World Championship
Silver medal – second place	2014 Toronto	Team
Silver medal – second place	2010 Birmingham	Team
Bronze medal – third place	2006 Amsterdam	Team
IWBF European Championships
Gold medal – first place	2015 Worcester	Team
Silver medal – second place	2013 Frankfurt	Team
Gold medal – first place	2011 Nazareth	Team
Gold medal – first place	2009 Stoke Mandeville	Team
Gold medal – first place	2007 Wetzlar	Team
Gold medal – first place	2005 Villeneuve d'Ascq	Team
Gold medal – first place	2003 Hamburg	Team
Hand-biking
Paralympic Games
Gold medal – first place	2020 Tokyo	Time trial H1–3
Silver medal – second place	2020 Tokyo	Road Race H1–4
Bronze medal – third place	2024 Paris	Road race H1–4
Bronze medal – third place	2024 Paris	Time trial H1–3
Road World Championships
Gold medal – first place	2019 Emmen	Road race H3
Gold medal – first place	2021 Cascais	Road race H3
Gold medal – first place	2022 Baie-Comeau	Road race H3
Gold medal – first place	2023 Glasgow	Road race H3
Gold medal – first place	2022 Baie-Comeau	Time Trial H3
Gold medal – first place	2024 Zurich	Time trial H3
Silver medal – second place	2021 Cascais	Time Trial H3
Silver medal – second place	2023 Glasgow	Time Trial H3
Silver medal – second place	2023 Glasgow	Mixed Relay
Silver medal – second place	2024 Zurich	Road race H3
Bronze medal – third place	2019 Emmen	Mixed Relay
Bronze medal – third place	2021 Cascais	Mixed Relay
Bronze medal – third place	2025 Ronse	Time trial H3
Bronze medal – third place	2025 Ronse	Road race H3
UCI Paracycling World Cup
Gold medal – first place	2022 Ostende	Road Race H3
Gold medal – first place	2022 Ostende	Time Trial H3
Gold medal – first place	2022 Quebec City	Time Trial H3
Gold medal – first place	2022 Elzach	Road Race H3
Gold medal – first place	2022 Quebec City	Road Race H3
Gold medal – first place	2023 Huntsville	Road Race H3
Gold medal – first place	2023 Ostende	Road Race H3
Gold medal – first place	2023 Maniago	Time Trial H3
Silver medal – second place	2019 Baie-Comeau	Road Race H3
Silver medal – second place	2022 Elzach	Time Trial H3
Silver medal – second place	2023 Maniago	Road Race H3
Bronze medal – third place	2022 Ostende	Time Trial H3
Bronze medal – third place	2022 Elzach	Mixed Relay
Bronze medal – third place	2023 Maniago	Mixed Relay
UEC Paracycling European Championships
Gold medal – first place	2022 Upper Austria	Road Race H3
Gold medal – first place	2022 Upper Austria	Time Trial H3
Gold medal – first place	2023 Rotterdam	Time Trial H3
Silver medal – second place	2023 Rotterdam	Road Race H3
Bronze medal – third place	2022 Upper Austria	Mixed Relay
Bronze medal – third place	2023 Rotterdam	Mixed Relay
German National Championships
Gold medal – first place	2022 Cologne	Road race H3
Gold medal – first place	2022 Cologne	Time trial H1-H5

Annika Zeyen-Giles (née Annika Zeyen born 17 February 1985) is a former 1.5-point wheelchair basketball player, who has played for ASV Bonn, RSV Lahn-Dill and BG Baskets Hamburg in the German wheelchair basketball league, and for the University of Alabama in the United States. She has represented her country a total of 382 times in which she won six European titles, was the runner-up at 2010 and 2014 World Championships, won silver medals at the 2008 Summer Paralympic Games in Beijing and 2016 Summer Paralympics in Rio de Janeiro, and won a gold medal at the 2012 Summer Paralympics in London, for which President Joachim Gauck awarded the team Germany's highest sporting honour, the Silbernes Lorbeerblatt (Silver Laurel Leaf). Following the Rio 2016 Paralympic Games, Zeyen retired from wheelchair basketball to pursue alternative sporting challenges as an individual athlete.

== Biography ==
Zeyen was born on 17 February 1985. She is nicknamed "Anni". At the age of 14, she was involved in a serious horse riding accident that left her paralysed. During rehab, she was introduced to the sport of wheelchair basketball. She left the hospital and started looking for a club where she could play.

== Wheelchair Basketball ==
Zeyen joined ASV Bonn, initially playing with the youth team, then with the seconds, and finally with the firsts. In 2001, she played in the German Championships for Women, and was named most valuable young player. In 2004, she switched to RSV Lahn-Dill, with which she won several German championships. She was invited to try out for the national team, and joined its development squad. She competed in her first paralympic games, the 2004 Summer Paralympics in Athens. She subsequently played for the national team that won the European championships in 2005, 2007, 2009 and 2011.

In September 2008, Zeyen participated in the 2008 Summer Paralympics in Beijing, but Germany was beaten in the gold medal match by the United States team, which contained three of her former teammates from the University of Alabama, Stephanie Wheeler, Mary Allison Milford and Alana Nichols. The German team took home Paralympic silver medals instead. After the Paralympics, the team's performance was considered impressive enough for it to be named the national "Team of the Year", and it received the Silver Laurel Leaf, Germany's highest sporting honour, from German President Horst Koehler.

Zeyen took up a scholarship to the University of Alabama in 2009, majoring in advertising and minoring in graphic design. She maintained a 4.0 grade point average. Her team at the University of Alabama won three titles in five years, narrowly missing out in March 2013 to the University of Wisconsin–Whitewater, which won the championship game 55–41, a game in which Zeyen scored 11 points. Zeyen was named an Academic All-American in 2012 and 2013.

In June 2012, Zeyen was named as one of the team that competed at the 2012 Summer Paralympic Games in London. In the Gold Medal match, her team faced Australia, a team that had defeated them 48–46 in Sydney just a few months before. They defeated the Australians 58–44 in front of a crowd of over 12,000 at the North Greenwich Arena to win the gold medal, the first that Germany had won in women's wheelchair basketball in 28 years. They were awarded a Silver Laurel Leaf by President Joachim Gauck in November 2012, and were again named Team of the Year for 2012.

The German team lost the European Championship to the Netherlands before a home town crowd of 2,300 in Frankfurt in July 2013 by a point, 56–57. The game was televised live in Germany, and cameras lingered on a tearful Zeyen, who could have tied the game and sent it into extra time with a free throw in its dying moments.

In April 2014, Zeyen was part of the BG Baskets Hamburg team that won the International Wheelchair Basketball Federation Euro League Challenge Cup, its first International title, with a 62–54 over the Frankfurt Mainhatten Skywheelers. The team also won the Fair Play Award of the International Wheelchair Basketball Federation Europe, and Zeyen was elected to its All Star team.

The German team claimed silver at the 2014 Women's World Wheelchair Basketball Championship in Toronto, Ontario, Canada, and beat the Netherlands in the 2015 European Championships, to claim its tenth European title. At the 2016 Paralympic Games, it won silver after losing the final to the United States. Zeyen was selected as the German flag bearer in the closing ceremony.

== Wheelchair racing ==
Zeyen announced her retirement from wheelchair basketball after the 2016 Rio Paralympics. Looking for a new challenge, she considered trying wheelchair racing. She contacted wheelchair racer Alhassane Baldé, who was also based in Bonn via Facebook, and soon began practising, using wheels and gloves Baldé loaned her, and following his advice. The technique used for wheelchair racing differs from that of wheelchair basketball: wheelchair basketball players push the rim of the wheel while racers strike it with round movements. Initially she was moving at only 20 kilometres per hour (12 mph) but as her technique improved doubled that speed. She bought her own racing wheelchair in February 2017, and in March she made her pro wheelchair racing debut at the World Para Athletics Grand Prix in Dubai. She was classified as a T54 athlete. She won every race she competed in at the German national championships in May 2017, setting new national records in the 800 m, 1,500m and 5,000m, and qualifying for the 2017 World Championships in London after only six months in the sport. She made the finals in the 200 m and 5,000 m. Later that year she finished sixth in the TCS New York Marathon in a time of 2:07:23.

== Handbiking ==
After a nerve injury affected her ability to move her arm backwards, Zeyen switched to handcycling, in which she was classified as an H3 athlete, in 2019. In her first year competing she finished runner up in her first World Cup Road Race in Baie-Comeau, Canada.

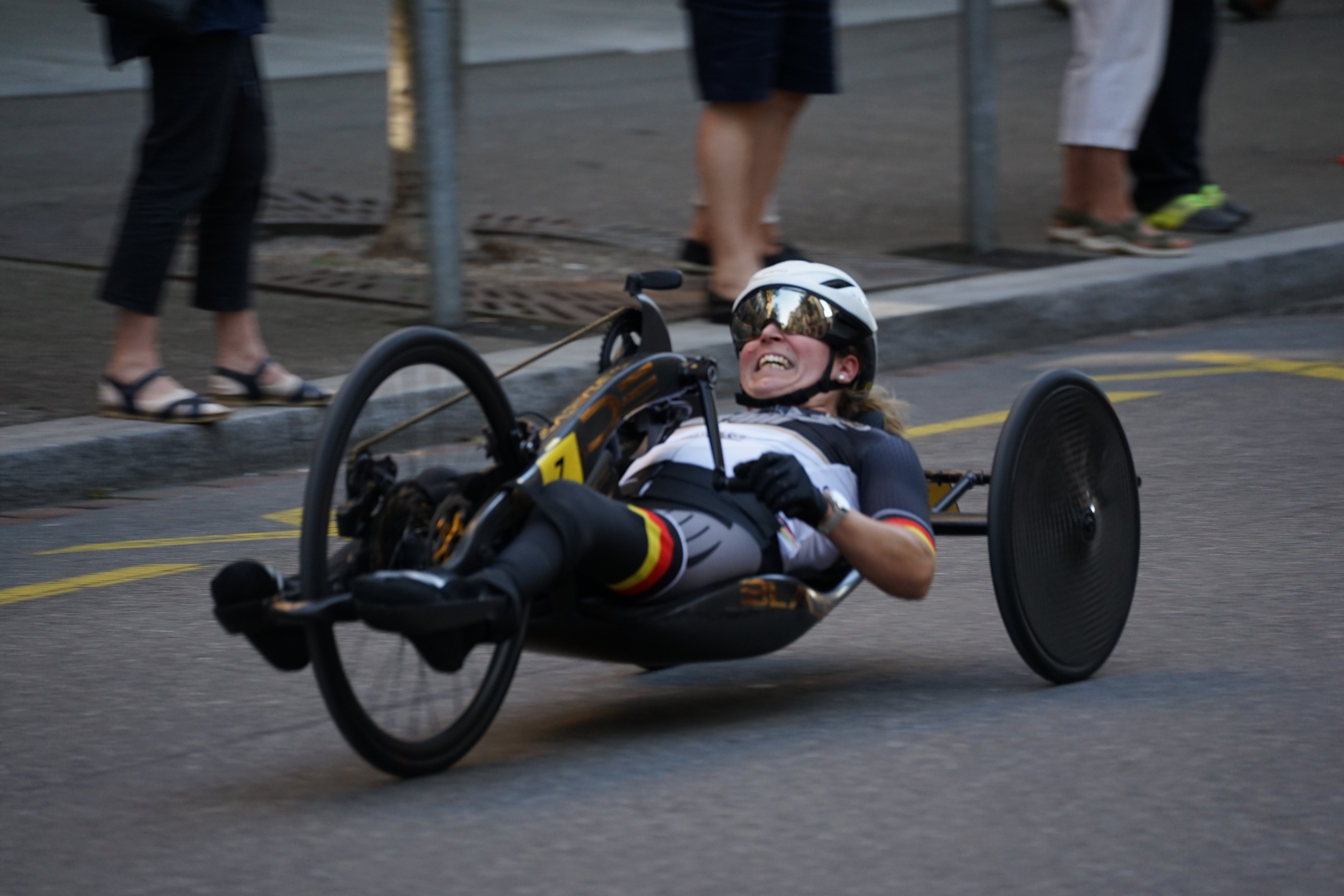
At the 2024 UCI Road and Para-cycling Road World Championships in Zurich – Mixed Handbike Team Relay

As a result of this impressive first competitive season, Zeyen was selected for the German National team to compete at the 2019 UCI Para-cycling Road World Championships in Emmen, Netherlands. Zeyen was selected to compete in the individual time trial and road race as well as the mixed relay team alongside Vico Merklein and Bernd Jeffre. The team finished third. This victory guaranteed a place for the German team in the relay at the 2020 Paralympic Games in Tokyo, Japan.

On 15 September 2019, Zeyen competed in the Women's H3 Road Race at the World Championships and took home the rainbow jersey and was crowned World Champion at her first attempt, beating pre-race favorite Alicia Dana from the United States by a little over 1 second. Annika completed the 51.8 km race in a time of 1 hour 37 minutes and 41 seconds.

Due to COVID-19 pandemic, there were no sanctioned races in 2020, but Zeyen returned to competition in June 2021 at the UCI Para-cycling Road World Championships at the Circuito EsTirol in Cascais, Portugal. She competed in the team relay along with Merklein and Jeffre as well as the individual time trial and road race. Annika was out to defend her road race rainbow jersey she won in two years earlier. On 9 June 2021, the German team finished the third in the mixed team relay and took the bronze medal behind Italy and Spain. Zeyen was the only female on the podium. The team completed the 17.82 km course in a time of 24 minutes and 7 seconds – 38 seconds behind first place.

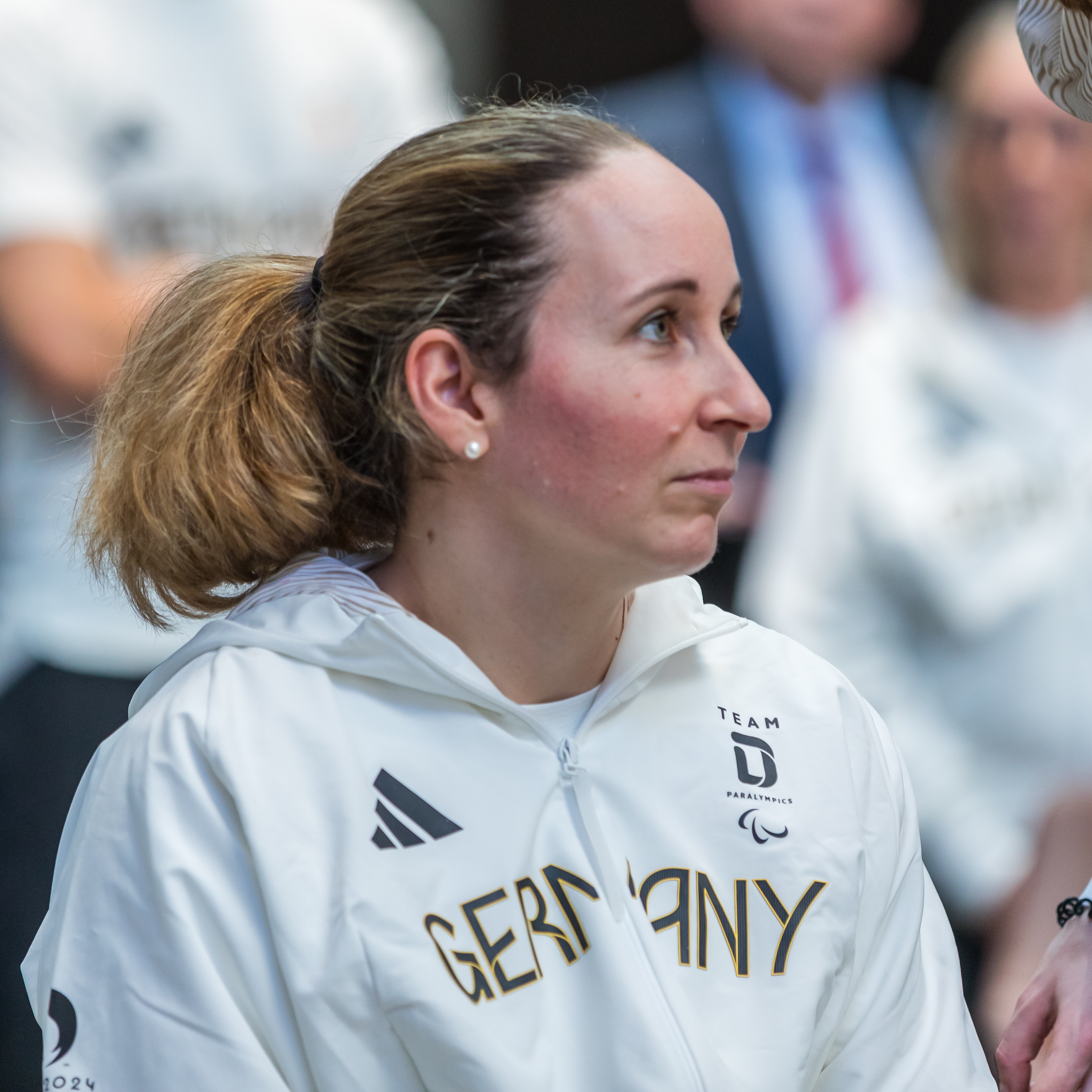
Zeyen before the 2024 Paris Paralympics

On 11 June 2021, Zeyen switched focus to the individual competitions with the H3W Time Trial. She completed the 16.8 km course in a time of 28 minutes and 59 seconds taking the silver medal behind Francesca Porcellato from Italy. Two days later, Zeyen competed in the Women's H3 Road Race at the looking to retain her rainbow jersey. In an extremely close race, she completed the 58.8 km race in a time of 1 hour 50 minutes and 56 seconds and beat Porcellato by less than a second.

At the 2020 Tokyo Paralympics, Zeyen won her first individual gold medal in the Women's road time trial H1–3. A powerful burst in the final lap resulted in finishing the 24 km course in 32:46.97, 43.55 ahead of Porcellato. Zeyen went on to win a silver medal in the H1–4 road race. She successfully defended her time trial world championship title at the 2022 UCI Para-cycling Road World Championships at Baie-Comeau and this time won the road race too. The following year, she won the road race at the 2023 UCI Para-cycling Road World Championships in Glasgow, and silver in the time trial.

Zeyen won bronze in both events at the 2024 Paris Paralympics. At the 2024 UCI Para-cycling Road World Championships in Zurich, Zeyen once again won the time trial event in her class, and finished second on the road race, and at the 2025 UCI Para-cycling Road World Championships in Ronse, Belgium, she won bronze in the time trial and road race, and was part of the German team that came fourth in the mixed team relay.

== Achievements ==
=== Wheelchair Basketball ===
- 2003: Gold at European Championships (Hamburg, Germany)
- 2005: Gold at European championships (Villeneuve d'Ascq, France)
- 2006: Bronze at World Championships (Amsterdam, Netherlands)
- 2007: Gold at European championships (Wetzlar, Germany)
- 2008: Silver at the Paralympic Games (Beijing, China)
- 2009: Gold at the European Championships (Stoke Mandeville, England)
- 2010: Silver at the World Championships (Birmingham, England)
- 2011: Gold at the European Championships (Nazareth, Israel)
- 2012: Gold at the Paralympic Games (London, England)
- 2013: Silver at the European Championships (Frankfurt, Germany)
- 2014: Silver at the World Championships (Toronto, Canada)
- 2015: Gold at the European Championships (Worcester, England)
- 2016: Silver at the Paralympic Games (Rio de Janeiro, Brazil)

=== Hand-biking ===
- 2019: Gold – UCI Paracycling World Road Championships – H3 Women Road Race (Emmen, Netherlands)
- 2019: Silver – UCI Paracycling World Cup Road Race – H3 Women (Baie-Comeau, Canada)
- 2019: Bronze – UCI Paracycling World Road Championships – Mixed Relay (Emmen, Netherlands)
- 2021: Gold – UCI Paracycling World Road Championships – H3 Women Road Race (Cascais, Portugal)
- 2021: Silver – UCI Paracycling World Road Championships – H3 Women Time Trial (Cascais, Portugal)
- 2021: Bronze – UCI Paracycling World Road Championships – Mixed Relay (Cascais, Portugal)
- 2021: Gold – Paralympic Games – H3 Women Time Trial (Tokyo, Japan)
- 2021: Silver – Paralympic Games – H3 Women Road Race (Tokyo, Japan)
- 2022: Gold – UCI Paracycling World Road Championships – H3 Women Road Race (Baie-Comeau, Canada)
- 2022: Gold – UCI Paracycling World Road Championships – H3 Women Time Trial (Baie-Comeau, Canada)
- 2023: Gold – UCI Paracycling World Road Championships – H3 Women Time Trial (Glasgow, Scotland)
- 2023: Silver – UCI Paracycling World Road Championships – H3 Women Road Race (Glasgow, Scotland)
- 2024: Gold – UCI Paracycling World Road Championships – H3 Women Time Trial (Zurich, Switzerland)
- 2024: Silver – UCI Paracycling World Road Championships – H3 Women Road Race (Zurich, Switzerland)
- 2024: Bronze – Paralympic Games – H3 Women Time Trial (Paris, France)
- 2024: Bronze – Paralympic Games – H3 Women Road Race (Paris, France)
- 2025: Bronze – UCI Paracycling World Road Championships – H3 Women Road Race (Ronse, Belgium)
- 2025: Bronze – UCI Paracycling World Road Championships – H3 Women Time Trial (Ronse, Belgium)

== Awards and recognition ==
- 2008: Team of the Year
- 2008: Silver Laurel Leaf
- 2012: Team of the Year
- 2012: Silver Laurel Leaf

On 7 January 2020, Zeyen was invited by Bonn Mayor Ashok Sridharan to sign the City of Bonn Golden Book. She signed again in 2022. Introduced in 1926, the Golden Book is a time-lapse; recording the extent to which the Federal Republic of Germany has gained international renown by including well-known personalities from around the world and locally who have shaped the city and contributed to Bonn's reputation. Signing the book is considered to be the highest honour someone from Bonn can receive. Zeyen's signature now sits alongside those of Pope John Paul II, Queen Elizabeth II and the Dalai Lama and she is the first Paralympian to sign the book.
