= Aziz Atakhodjaev =

Uzbekistani para-cyclist (born 1979)

Personal information
- Nationality: Uzbekistani
- Born: 7 April 1986 (age 40)

Sport
- Sport: Para-cycling
- Disability class: T1
Medal record
Representing Uzbekistan
Men's para-cycling
Road World Championships
Bronze medal – third place	2024 Zurich	Time trial H1
Bronze medal – third place	2024 Zurich	Road race H1
Bronze medal – third place	2025 Ronse	Time trial T1

Aziz Atakhodjaev (born 7 April 1986) is an Uzbekistani para-cyclist.

== Career ==
In September 2024, Atakhodjaev competed at the 2024 UCI Para-cycling Road World Championships and won bronze medals in the time trial and road race T1 events.
