= Mattis Lebeau =

French para-cyclist (born 1999)

Personal information
- Nationality: French
- Born: 12 January 1999 (age 27)

Sport
- Sport: Para-cycling
- Disability class: C4
Medal record
Men's Para-cycling
Representing France
Road World Championships
Gold medal – first place	2024 Zurich	Time trial C4
Gold medal – first place	2025 Ronse	Time trial C4
Gold medal – first place	2025 Ronse	Road race C4
Silver medal – second place	2024 Zurich	Road race C4

Mattis Lebeau (born 12 January 1999) is a French Para-cyclist.

== Career ==
Lebeau competed in the 2024 Tour de Guadeloupe and finished in eighth place. On 21 September 2024, he was selected to compete at the 2024 UCI Para-cycling Road World Championships. He won a gold medal in the time trial C4 event and a silver medal in the road race C4 event.
