= Marcos Antônio Ferreira =

Brazilian para-cyclist (born 1979)

Marcos Melo Jr
Personal information
- Full name: Marcos Antônio Ferreira de Melo Junior
- Nationality: Brazilian
- Born: 1 January 1979 (age 47) Belo Horizonte/MG
- Height: 1.73 m (5 ft 8 in)
- Weight: 72 Kg

Sport
- Sport: Para-cycling
- Disability: Tetraplegia C6
- Disability class: H1
- Club: Mountain Bike BH
- Coached by: Diego Antunes
Medal record
Representing Brazil
Men's para-cycling
Road World Championships
Silver medal – second place	2024 Zurich	Time trial H1
Bronze medal – third place	2024 Zurich	Road race H1

Marcos Antônio Ferreira de Melo Junior (born 1 January 1979) is a Brazilian para-cyclist.

== Career ==
He competed in the 2023 Road World Cup. In September 2024, he competed at the 2024 UCI Para-cycling Road World Championships and won a silver medal in the time trial and a bronze medal in the road race H1 events.
