= Julia Dierkesmann =

German para-cyclist (born 1967)

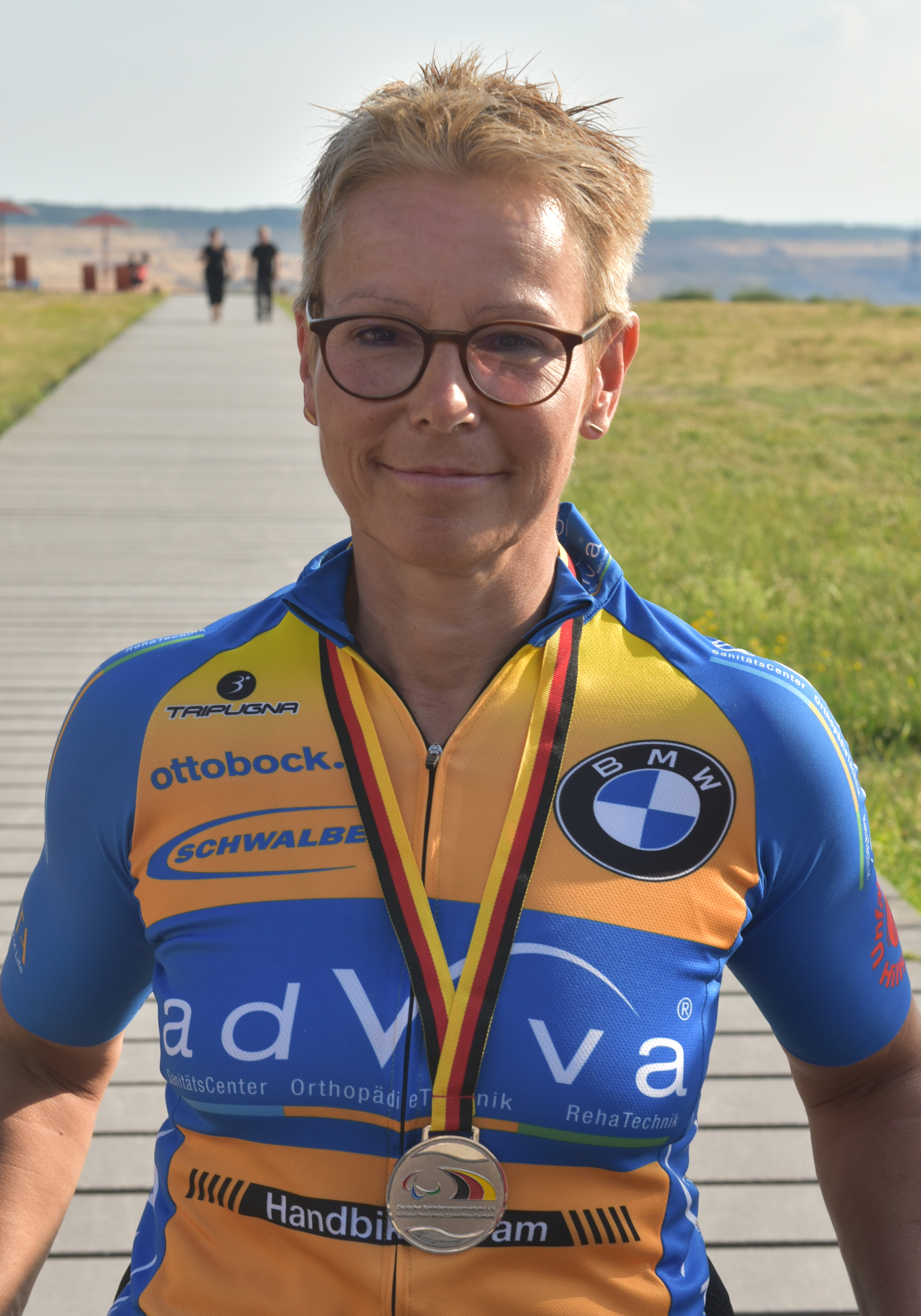
- Julia Dierkesmann (2023)

Personal information
- Born: 23 May 1967 (age 59)

Cycling career
- Sport: Cycling
- Discipline: Road
- Role: Rider
Medal record
Women's para-cycling
Representing Germany
Road World Championships
Bronze medal – third place	2024 Zurich	Time trial H4

Julia Dierkesmann (born 23 May 1967) is a German para-cyclist who competes in road events. She is a bronze medalist at the Road World Championships.

== Career ==
Dierkesmann made her international debut for Germany at the 2023 UCI Para-cycling Track World Championships in August 2023. A month later, she competed in the Berlin Marathon, winning the women's handcycle race. In September 2024, Dierkesmann competed at the 2024 UCI Para-cycling Road World Championships in the time trial and road race H4 events, winning a bronze medal in the former.
