= Gilmara Sol do Rosário Gonçalves =

Brazilian para-cyclist (born 1971)

Personal information
- Born: 1 October 1971 (age 55) Brazil

Cycling career
- Sport: Cycling
- Discipline: Road
- Role: Rider
Medal record
Representing Brazil
Women's para-cycling
Road World Championships
Silver medal – second place	2023 Glasgow	Time trial H2
Bronze medal – third place	2023 Glasgow	Road race H2
Bronze medal – third place	2024 Zurich	Road race H2
Bronze medal – third place	2024 Zurich	Time trial H2
Bronze medal – third place	2025 Ronse	Time trial H2
Bronze medal – third place	2025 Ronse	Road race H2

Gilmara Sol do Rosário Gonçalves (born 1 October 1971) is a Brazilian para-cyclist. She has represented Brazil in Paracycling World Cup and other national and international competitions.

== Career ==
In August 2023, Gonçalves competed at the 2023 UCI Para-cycling Road World Championships and won the silver medal in the time trial and bronze medal in the road race. In September 2024, she competed at the 2024 UCI Para-cycling Road World Championships and won bronze medals in the road race and time trial.
