= Goalball at the 2023 European Para Championships =

- Venue: Rotterdam Ahoy
- Location: Rotterdam, Netherlands
- Start date: 10 August
- End date: 13 August
- Competitors: 48 from 8 nations

Goalball at the 2023 European Para Championships in Rotterdam, Netherlands was held between 10 and 13 August. Only men's event took place, no women's event.

== Medalists ==
Event	Gold	Silver	Bronze
Men's team	Sweden	Hungary	Spain

== Results ==
=== Group A ===
Netherlands,France,Spain,Azerbaijan

1. France 9-1 Netherlands
2. France 9-2 Spain
3. France 11-1 Azerbaijan
4. Netherlands 5-8 Spain
5. Netherlands 9-5 Azerbaijan
6. Spain 12-2 Azerbaijan

=== Group B ===
Bulgaria,Italy,Sweden,Hungary

1. Sweden 7-8 Hungary
2. Sweden 5-4 Italy
3. Sweden 11-9 Bulgaria
4. Hungary 12-11 Italy
5. Hungary 17-7 Bulgaria
6. Italy 15-8 Bulgaria

=== Quarterfinal ===
1. France W-L Bulgaria R (10-0) Retired Bulgaria
2. Sweden 10-2 Netherlands
3. Spain 8-2 Italy
4. Hungary 15-5 Azerbaijan

=== Semifinal ===
==== 1-4 ====
1. Sweden 10-5 France
2. Hungary 5-3 Spain

==== 5-8 ====
1. Netherlands 12-2 Azerbaijan
2. Italy 9-8 Bulgaria

=== Final ===
1. 7-8: Bulgaria 7-3 Azerbaijan
2. 5-6: Italy 10-2 Netherlands
3. 3-4: Spain 6-5 France
4. 1-2: Sweden 11-5 Hungary
