= 2023 UCI Para-cycling Road World Championships =

- Location: Glasgow, Scotland
- Dates: 9–14 August 2023

The 2023 UCI Para-cycling Road World Championships was the 12th edition of the World Championships for road cycling for athletes with a physical disability. The championships took place in Dumfries and Galloway in Scotland from 9 to 14 August 2023. The championships formed part of the inaugural cross-discipline 2023 UCI World Cycling Championships.

== Medalists ==
Events are held in four broad categories, with four different types of bicycle, denoted by a letter-number code:

- B1 are pairs races for blind and visually impaired cyclists, riding a tandem bicycle with a sighted 'pilot'.
- C1-C5 are cyclists on standard or near-standard bicycles, with minor modifications to allow use by paracyclists, e.g. attachments on handlebars or pedals.
- H1-H5 are hand cycling races using tricycles powered by hand-cranking of pedals from a recumbent position. Typically hand-cyclists share similar lower body disabilities to wheelchair racing athletes in para athletics, but in H1-H5 events, their power is applied indirectly through a chained and geared pedal system rather than directly to the wheels of the chair by pushing to create the distinction between cycling and athletics. There are no 'H' class track events.
- T1-T2 are Tricycle races, typically for cyclists with good movement but significant balance or co-ordination issues for whom a two-wheeled bicycle is not suitable. There are no 'T' class track events.

As a general rule, the lower the number in the race code (e.g., C4 or H2), the greater the level of impairment.

=== Men's events ===
Event	Class	Gold		Silver		Bronze	
Time trial
10.8 km time trial	C1	Ricardo Ten Argiles; Spain	25:04.29	Michael Teuber; Germany	+ 6.04	Aaron Keith; United States	+ 45.58
10.8 km time trial	C2	Alexandre Léauté; France	23:10.91	Darren Hicks; Australia	+6.17	Ewoud Vromant; Belgium	+25.40
10.8 km time trial	C3	Matthias Schindler; Germany	22:50.27	Finlay Graham; Great Britain	+1.98	Michael Sametz; Canada	+35.20
10.8 km time trial	H1	Pieter du Preez; South Africa	24:07.20	Maxime Hordies; Belgium	+ 7.27	Fabrizio Cornegliani; Italy	+ 47.63
10.8 km time trial	H2	Sergio Garrote; Spain	17:08.52	Florian Jouanny; France	+ 47.04	Luca Mazzone; Italy	+1:00.99
17.8 km time trial	H3	Mark Mekenkamp; Netherlands	26:09.48	Ryan Pinney; United States	+ 56.27	Federico Mestroni; Italy	+ 57.75
17.8 km time trial	H4	Jetze Plat; Netherlands	24:23.56	Mathieu Bosredon; France	+ 8.17	Joseph Fritsch; France	+ 11.18
17.8 km time trial	H5	Mitch Valize; Netherlands	24:20.81	Tim de Vries; Netherlands	+ 1:22.07	Loïc Vergnaud; France	+ 1:25.29
10.8 km time trial	T1	Nathan Clement; Canada	18:50.35	Chen Jianxin; China	+ 7.05	Lu Rongfei; China	+ 18.75
10.8 km time trial	T2	Maximilian Jäger; Germany	18:05.80 -	Tim Celen; Belgium	+ 6.89	Felix Barrow; Great Britain	+ 8.90
28.4 km time trial	B	Netherlands; Tristan Bangma; Patrick Bos (p)	32:49.13	Netherlands; Vincent ter Schure; Timo Fransen (p)	+ 6.21	France; Elie de Carvalho; Mikhael Guichard (p)	+ 17.68
28.4 km time trial	C4	Kévin Le Cunff; France	35:52.85	Gatien Le Rousseau; France	+48.93	Jozef Metelka; Slovakia	+1:14.70
28.4 km time trial	C5	Daniel Abraham Gebru; Netherlands	35:01.01	Lauro Chaman; Brazil	+39.66	Dorian Foulon; France	+1:17.15
Road race
28.4 km road race	H1	Maxime Hordies; Belgium	1:27:17	Fabrizio Cornegliani; Italy	+0:20	Barry Wilcox; United States	+0:21
28.4 km road race	T1	Lu Rongfei; China	56:30	Chen Jianxin; China	+7:44	Nathan Clement; Canada	+7:58
37.8 km road race	T2	Dennis Connors; United States	57:19	Tim Celen; Belgium	+0:00	Maximilian Jäger; Germany	+0:03
47.3 km road race	H2	Florian Jouanny; France	1:22:31	Sergio Garrote; Spain	+0:05	Luca Mazzone; Italy	+9:08
66.2 km road race	H3	Mirko Testa; Italy	1:45:33	Johan Quaile; France	+0:00	Vico Merklein; Germany	+0:00
66.2 km road race	H4	Jonas van de Steene; Netherlands	1:33:50	Mathieu Bosredon; France	+0:00	Thomas Frühwirth; Austria	+0:06
66.2 km road race	H5	Mitch Valize; Netherlands	1:41:26	Tim de Vries; Netherlands	+2:34	Loïc Vergnaud; France	+2:44
70.2 km road race	C1	Liang Weicong; China	1:43:43	Ricardo Ten; Spain	s.t.	Michael Teuber; Germany	+ 2' 54"
70.2 km road race	C2	Alexandre Leaute; France	1:34.38	Darren Hicks; Australia	+ 2"	Ewoud Vromant; Belgium	+ 45
70.2 km road race	C3	Finlay Graham; Great Britain	1:32:59	Thomas Darte; France	+ 2"	Ben Watson; Great Britain	+ 15"
81.9 km road race	C4	Kévin Le Cunff; France	2:15:26	Ronan Grimes; Ireland	+ 5"	Archie Atkinson; Great Britain	+ 1' 5"
81.9 km road race	C5	William Bjergfelt; Great Britain	2:12:20	Yehor Dementyev; Ukraine	+ 2"	Andrea Tarlao; Italy	+ 6"
105.3 km road race	B	Netherlands; Tristan Bangma; Patrick Bos	2:24:43	Netherlands; Vincent ter Schure; Timo Fransen	+ 2"	France; Elie de Carvalho; Mickael Guichard	s.t.

=== Women's events ===
Event	Class	Gold		Silver		Bronze	
Time trial
10.8 km time trial	C1	Fran Brown; Great Britain	27:28.57	Qian Wangwei; China	+ 2:23.77	Katie Toft; Great Britain	+ 4:17.18
10.8 km time trial	C2	Maike Hausberger; Germany	27:23.40	Flurina Rigling; Switzerland	+ 15.18	Amelia Cass; Great Britain	+ 1:00.64
10.8 km time trial	C3	Anna Beck; Sweden	26:22.09	Wang Xiaomei; China	+ 29.41	Keiko Sugiura; Japan	+ 37.14
10.8 km time trial	H1	Luisa Pasini; Italy	41:03.87	Darin Sheepchondan; Thailand	+ 1:20.85		
10.8 km time trial	H2	Roberta Amadeo; Italy	25:52.66	Gilmara Sol do Rosário Gonçalves; Brazil	+ 10:55.51	Angela Procida; Italy	+ 11:44.74
10.8 km time trial	H3	Lauren Parker; Australia	29:59.44	Annika Zeyen; Germany	+ 1:11.54	Anais Vincent; France	+ 1:14.11
10.8 km time trial	H4	Jennette Jansen; Netherlands	31:30.41	Lee Do-yeon; South Korea	+ 47.09	Giulia Ruffato; Italy	+ 1:04.44
10.8 km time trial	H5	Chantal Haenen; Netherlands	29:52.88	Andrea Eskau; Germany	+ 24.55	Ana Maria Vitelaru; Italy	+ 1:22.30
10.8 km time trial	T1	Pavlína Vejvodová; Czech Republic	24:09.34	Eltje Malzbender; New Zealand	+ 2:10.70	Shelley Gautier; Canada	+ 3:21.64
10.8 km time trial	T2	Celine van Till; Switzerland	20:14.23	Angelika Dreock-Kaser; Germany	+ 1:02.34	Emma Lund; Denmark	+ 1:09.98
28.4 km time trial	B	Ireland; Katie-George Dunlevy; Linda Kelly (p)	37:18.22	Great Britain; Sophie Unwin; Jenny Holl (p)	+ 1' 1"	France; Anne-Sophie Centis; Elize Delzenne (p)	+ 1' "54
28.4 km time trial	C4	Samantha Bosco; United States	40:57.70	Emily Petricola; Australia	+ 1' 00"	Keely Shaw; Canada	+ 1' 29"
28.4 km time trial	C5	Sarah Storey; Great Britain	39:29,89	Alana Forster; Australia	+ 1' 14"	Heïdi Gaugain; France	+ 1' 22"
Road race
28.4 km road race	H1	Luisa Pasini; Italy	2:03:19	Darin Sheepchondan; Thailand	+37:01	Not awarded	
28.4 km road race	T1	Pavlína Vejvodová; Czech Republic	1:15:30	Eltje Malzbender; New Zealand	+6:55	Shelley Gautier; Canada	+12:59
37.8 km road race	T2	Emma Lund; Denmark	1:03:41	Celine van Till; Switzerland	+0:00	Jana Majunke; Germany	+0:30
47.3 km road race	H2	Roberta Amadeo; Italy	1:45:45	Angela Procida; Italy	+14:40	Gilmara Sol do Rosário Gonçalves; Brazil	+16:39
66.2 km road race	H3	Annika Zeyen; Germany	1:27:44	Lauren Parker; Australia	+0:03	Anaïs Vincent; France	+0:03
66.2 km road race	H4	Jennette Jansen; Netherlands	1:31:15	Lee Do-yeon; South Korea	+1:26	Suzanna Tangen; Norway	+3:09
66.2 km road race	H5	Oksana Masters; United States	1:32:00	Chantal Haenen; Netherlands	+0:00	Andrea Eskau; Germany	+0:00
70.2 km road race	C1	Fran Brown; Great Britain	2:00:22	Qian Wangwei; China	+ 3:58	Yang Jiafan; China	+ 8:53
70.2 km road race	C2	Flurina Rigling; Switzerland	2:00.03	Daniela Munévar; Colombia	+ 2"	Maike Hausberger; Germany	+ 2"
70.2 km road race	C3	Wang Xiaomei; China	1:54.15	Keiko Sugiura; Japan	s.t	Paige Greco; Australia	s.t
81.9 km road race	C4	Samantha Bosco; United States	2:07:19	Emily Petricola; Australia	+ 4:01	Meg Lemon; Australia	+ 4:57
81.9 km road race	C5	Sarah Storey; Great Britain	2:07.16	Heïdi Gaugain; France	+ 2"	Paula Ossa; Colombia	s.t.
105.3 km road race	B	Ireland; Katie-George Dunlevy; Linda Kelly	1:59:49	Poland; Otylia Marczuk; Ewa Bankowska	+ 1:14	Great Britain; Sophie Unwin; Jenny Holl	+ 4:16

=== Mixed events ===
Event	Class	Gold		Silver		Bronze	
15.8 km team relay	H1–5	France; Johan Quaile; Florian Jouanny; Joseph Fritsch	25:35	Germany; Johannes Herter; Annika Zeyen; Vico Merklein	25:50	United States; Brandon Lyons; Alicia Dana; Travis Gaertner	26:06

== Medal table ==
* Host nation (Great Britain)

Rank	Nation	Gold	Silver	Bronze	Total
1	Netherlands (NED)	11	5	0	16
2	France (FRA)	6	7	10	23
3	Great Britain (GBR)*	6	2	6	14
4	Italy (ITA)	5	2	8	15
5	Germany (GER)	4	5	6	15
6	United States (USA)	4	1	2	7
7	China (CHN)	3	5	2	10
8	Spain (ESP)	2	2	0	4
8	Switzerland (SUI)	2	2	0	4
10	Ireland (IRL)	2	1	0	3
11	Czech Republic (CZE)	2	0	0	2
12	Australia (AUS)	1	6	2	9
13	Belgium (BEL)	1	3	2	6
14	Canada (CAN)	1	0	5	6
15	Denmark (DEN)	1	0	1	2
15	South Africa (RSA)	1	0	1	2
17	Sweden (SWE)	1	0	0	1
18	Brazil (BRA)	0	2	1	3
19	New Zealand (NZL)	0	2	0	2
19	South Korea (KOR)	0	2	0	2
19	Thailand (THA)	0	2	0	2
22	Colombia (COL)	0	1	1	2
22	Japan (JPN)	0	1	1	2
24	Poland (POL)	0	1	0	1
24	Ukraine (UKR)	0	1	0	1
26	Austria (AUT)	0	0	1	1
26	Norway (NOR)	0	0	1	1
26	Slovakia (SVK)	0	0	1	1
Totals (28 entries)		53	53	51	157
