= 2024 UCI Para-cycling Road World Championships =

- Location: Zurich, Switzerland
- Dates: 21–29 September

The 2024 UCI Para-cycling Road World Championships was the 13th edition of World Championships for road cycling for athletes with a physical disability. The championships took place in Zurich, Switzerland from 21 to 29 September 2024.

== Medalists ==
Events are held in four broad categories, with four different types of bicycle, denoted by a letter-number code:

- B1 are pairs races for blind and visually impaired cyclists, riding a tandem bicycle with a sighted 'pilot'.
- C1-C5 are cyclists on standard or near-standard bicycles, with minor modifications to allow use by paracyclists, e.g. attachments on handlebars or pedals.
- H1-H5 are hand cycling races using tricycles powered by hand-cranking of pedals from a recumbent position. Typically hand-cyclists share similar lower body disabilities to wheelchair racing athletes in para athletics, but in H1-H5 events, their power is applied indirectly through a chained and geared pedal system rather than directly to the wheels of the chair by pushing to create the distinction between cycling and athletics. There are no 'H' class track events.
- T1-T2 are Tricycle races, typically for cyclists with good movement but significant balance or co-ordination issues for whom a two-wheeled bicycle is not suitable. There are no 'T' class track events.

As a general rule, the lower the number in the race code (e.g., C4 or H2), the greater the level of impairment.

=== Men's events ===
Event	Class	Gold		Silver		Bronze	
Time trial
11.3 km time trial	T1	Nathan Clement; Canada	18' 48.16"	Giorgio Farroni; Italy	+ 1' 25.03"	Aziz Atakhodjaev; Uzbekistan	+ 1' 42.55"
11.3 km time trial	T2	Felix Barrow; Great Britain	16' 28.66"	Tim Celen; Belgium	+ 34.84"	Dennis Connors; United States	+ 35.73"
18.8 km time trial	C1	Ricardo Ten Argilés; Spain	25' 25.48"	Zbigniew Maciejewski; Poland	+ 16.32"	Andre Wijnhoud; Netherlands	+ 39.28"
18.8 km time trial	C2	Ewoud Vromant; Belgium	23' 13.58"	Alexandre Léauté; France	+ 20.18"	Matthew Robertson; Great Britain	+ 1' 04.22"
18.8 km time trial	C3	Florian Bouziani; France	23' 30.01"	Finlay Graham; Great Britain	+ 2.11"	Alexandre Hayward; Canada	+ 4.75"
18.8 km time trial	H1	Fabrizio Cornegliani; Italy	39' 59.70"	Marcos Antonio Ferreira; Brazil	+ 2' 35.70"	Maxime Hordies; Belgium	+ 2' 45.49"
18.8 km time trial	H2	Luca Mazzone; Italy	28' 01.65"	Florian Jouanny; France	+ 40.25"	Sergio Garrote Muñoz; Spain	+ 54.61"
18.8 km time trial	H3	Mathieu Bosredon; France	23' 59.70"	Mark Mekenkamp; Netherlands	+ 1' 04.46"	Marvin Odent; Belgium	+ 1' 20.21"
18.8 km time trial	H4	Thomas Frühwirth; Austria	23' 47.13"	Fabian Recher; Switzerland	+ 57.39"	Joseph Fritsch; France	+ 1' 15.69"
18.8 km time trial	H5	Mitch Valize; Netherlands	24' 39.52"	Loïc Vergnaud; France	+ 1' 20.84"	Tim de Vries; Netherlands	+ 2' 43.59"
29.9 km time trial	B	Netherlands; Tristan Bangma; Pilot: Patrick Bos	37' 36.91"	France; Alexandre Lloveras; Pilot: Yoann Paillot	+ 40.34"	Spain; Imanol Arriortua Zorrilla; Pilot: Francisco García Rus	+ 51.11"
29.9 km time trial	C4	Mattis Lebeau; France	40' 49.60"	Kévin Le Cunff; France	+ 16.25"	Gatien Le Rousseau; France	+ 1' 04.58"
29.9 km time trial	C5	Daniel Abraham; Netherlands	40' 35.90"	Lauro Chaman; Brazil	+ 4.43"	Yehor Dementyev; Ukraine	+ 28.41"
Road race
31.8 km road race	T1	Nathan Clement; Canada	1h 01' 20"	Giorgio Farroni; Italy	s.t.	Aziz Atakhodjaev; Uzbekistan	+ 2' 47"
31.8 km road race	T2	Dennis Connors; United States	55' 20"	Maximilian Jäger; Germany	+ 2"	Wolfgang Steinbichler; Austria	+ 3"
38.0 km road race	H1	Maxime Hordies; Belgium	1h 17' 33"	Fabrizio Cornegliani; Italy	s.t.	Marcos Antonio Ferreira; Brazil	+ 3' 08"
38.0 km road race	H2	Sergio Garrote Muñoz; Spain	1h 04' 25"	Florian Jouanny; France	+ 1' 03"	Luca Mazzone; Italy	+ 10' 07"
57.8 km road race	H3	Mathieu Bosredon; France	1h 42' 38"	Martino Pini; Italy	+ 5' 54"	Christian Gyldenøhr; Norway	+ 6' 18"
57.8 km road race	H4	Joseph Fritsch; France	1h 34' 12"	Thomas Frühwirth; Austria	+ 4' 31"	Fabian Recher; Switzerland	+ 6' 27"
57.8 km road race	H5	Mitch Valize; Netherlands	1h 39' 12"	Loïc Vergnaud; France	+ 1' 03"	Pavlo Bal; Ukraine	+ 1' 06"
62.7 km road race	C1	Ricardo Ten Argilés; Spain	1h 37' 35"	Zbigniew Maciejewski; Poland	s.t.	Pierre Senska; Germany	+ 4' 05"
62.7 km road race	C2	Alexandre Léauté; France	1h 29' 27"	Matthew Robertson; Great Britain	+ 45"	Ewoud Vromant; Belgium	+ 7' 54"
71.6 km road race	C3	Finlay Graham; Great Britain	1h 55' 24"	Benjamin Watson; Great Britain	+ 13"	Alexandre Hayward; Canada	+ 1' 28"
90.2 km road race	C4	Gatien Le Rousseau; France	2h 13' 27"	Mattis Lebeau; France	s.t.	Kévin Le Cunff; France	s.t.
90.2 km road race	C5	Yehor Dementyev; Ukraine	2h 15' 02"	Elouan Gardon; United States	s.t.	Lauro Chaman; Brazil	s.t.
103.2 km road race	B	Netherlands; Tristan Bangma; Patrick Bos	2:25:18	Spain; Imanol Arriortua Zorrilla; Francisco García Rus	s.t.	France; Alexandre Lloveras; Yoann Paillot	s.t.

=== Women's events ===
Event	Class	Gold		Silver		Bronze	
Time trial
11.3 km time trial	H1	Manuela Vos van den Bouwhuijsen; Spain	33' 58.83"	Luisa Pasini; Italy	+ 7' 04.90"		
11.3 km time trial	H2	Katie Brim; United States	+ 15' 54.04"	Roberta Amadeo; Italy	+ 4' 06.35"	Gilmara Sol do Rosário Gonçalves; Brazil	+ 9' 56.12"
11.3 km time trial	T1	Marieke van Soest; Netherlands	+ 20' 51.44"	Pavlína Vejvodová; Czech Republic	+ 51' 64"	Eltje Malzbender; New Zealand	+ 3' 17.06"
11.3 km time trial	T2	Celine van Till; Switzerland	+ 18' 34.30"	Emma Lund; Denmark	+ 24.21"	Angelika Dreock-Käser; Germany	+ 2' 07.22"
18.8 km time trial	C1	Frances Brown; Great Britain	29' 27.93"	Katie Toft; Great Britain	+ 4' 09.42"		
18.8 km time trial	C2	Flurina Rigling; Switzerland	26' 45.60"	Daphne Schrager; Great Britain	+ 23.01"	Amelia Cass; Great Britain	+ 2' 17.26"
18.8 km time trial	C3	Anna Beck; Sweden	25' 54.65"	Jamie Whitmore; United States	+ 2' 41.55"	Paula Caballeros; Colombia	+ 2' 51.53"
18.8 km time trial	H3	Annika Zeyen; Germany	29' 06.34"	Lauren Parker; Australia	+ 10.81"	Anaïs Vincent; France	+ 42.86"
18.8 km time trial	H4	Svetlana Moshkovich; Austria	30' 13.47"	Cornelia Wibmer; Austria	+ 1.95"	Julia Dierkesmann; Germany	+ 54.03"
18.8 km time trial	H5	Chantal Haenen; Netherlands	28' 48.17"	Andrea Eskau; Germany	+ 1' 37.07"	Ana Maria Vitelaru; Italy	+ 3' 53.15"
29.9 km time trial	B	Ireland; Katie-George Dunlevy; Pilot: Linda Kelly	43' 14.47"	Great Britain; Sophie Unwin; Pilot: Jenny Holl	+ 1' 09.70"	Great Britain; Lora Fachie; Pilot: Corrine Hall	+ 1' 38.44"
29.9 km time trial	C4	Franziska Matile-Dörig; Switzerland	47' 44.53"	Samantha Bosco; United States	+ 21.00"	Katell Alençon; France	+ 5' 57.26"
29.9 km time trial	C5	Sarah Storey; Great Britain	45' 25.45"	Heïdi Gaugain; France	+ 1' 36.78"	Kerstin Brachtendorf; Germany	+ 2' 09.63"
Road race
31.8 km road race	T1	Marieke van Soest; Netherlands	1h 03' 52"	Pavlína Vejvodová; Czech Republic	+ 11' 49"	Eltje Malzbender; New Zealand	+ 1 LAP
31.8 km road race	T2	Emma Lund; Denmark	1h 02' 45"	Celine van Till; Switzerland	+ 1' 00"	Angelika Dreock-Käser; Germany	+ 6' 07"
38.0 km road race	H1	Luisa Pasini; Italy	1h 27' 26"	Manuela Vos van den Bouwhuijsen; Spain	+ 1' 33"		
38.0 km road race	H2	Katie Brim; United States	1h 10' 56"	Roberta Amadeo; Italy	+ 1 LAP	Gilmara Sol do Rosário Gonçalves; Brazil	+ 2 LAP
38.0 km road race	H3	Jady Malavazzi; Brazil	1h 10' 11"	Annika Zeyen; Germany	s.t.	Anaïs Vincent; France	s.t.
38.0 km road race	H4	Jennette Jansen; Netherlands	1h 10' 12"	Cornelia Wibmer; Austria	+ 2"	Sandra Fuhrer; Switzerland	+ 15"
38.0 km road race	H5	Chantal Haenen; Netherlands	1h 12' 54"	Ana Maria Vitelaru; Italy	s.t.	Andrea Eskau; Germany	+ 5' 37"
56.5 km road race	C1	Fran Brown; Great Britain	1h 38' 02"				
56.5 km road race	C2	Flurina Rigling; Switzerland	1h 34' 47"	Daphne Schrager; Great Britain	+ 3' 03"	Daniela Munévar; Colombia	s.t.
56.5 km road race	C3	Aniek van den Aarssen; Netherlands	1h 37' 48"	Paula Caballeros; Colombia	+ 1"	Jamie Whitmore; United States	+ 2"
70.2 km road race	C4	Samantha Bosco; United States	2h 02' 33"	Franziska Matile-Dörig; Switzerland	+ 44"	Katell Alençon; France	+ 1 LAP
70.2 km road race	C5	Sarah Storey; Great Britain	1h 55' 28"	Morgan Newberry; Great Britain	+ 7' 09"	Alana Forster; Australia	+ 7' 49"
84.7 km road race	B	Ireland; Katie-George Dunlevy; Linda Kelly	2:25:18	United Kingdom; Sophie Unwin; Jenny Holl	+1:23	Ireland; Josephine Healion; Eve McCrystal	+1:39

=== Mixed events ===
Event	Class	Gold		Silver		Bronze	
16.6 km team relay	H1–5	France; Johan Quaile; Florian Jouanny; Joseph Fritsch	24:55	Italy; Federico Mestroni; Luca Mazzone; Davide Cortini	25:03	Spain; David Mouriz; Sergio Garrote Muñoz; Luis Miguel García-Marquina	25:05

== Medal table ==
* Host nation (Switzerland)

Rank	Nation	Gold	Silver	Bronze	Total
1	Netherlands (NED)	11	2	2	15
2	France (FRA)	8	9	8	25
3	Great Britain (GBR)	6	9	3	18
4	United States (USA)	5	3	2	10
5	Spain (ESP)	4	2	3	9
6	Switzerland (SUI)*	4	2	2	8
7	Italy (ITA)	3	9	2	14
8	Austria (AUT)	2	3	1	6
9	Belgium (BEL)	2	1	3	6
10	Canada (CAN)	2	0	2	4
11	Ireland (IRL)	2	0	1	3
12	Germany (GER)	1	3	6	10
13	Brazil (BRA)	1	2	4	7
14	Denmark (DEN)	1	1	0	2
15	Ukraine (UKR)	1	0	2	3
16	Sweden (SWE)	1	0	0	1
17	Czech Republic (CZE)	0	2	0	2
17	Poland (POL)	0	2	0	2
19	Colombia (COL)	0	1	2	3
20	Australia (AUS)	0	1	1	2
21	New Zealand (NZL)	0	0	2	2
21	Uzbekistan (UZB)	0	0	2	2
23	Norway (NOR)	0	0	1	1
Totals (23 entries)		54	52	49	155
