= Suzanna Tangen =

Norwegian para-cyclist (born 1989)

Personal information
- Nationality: Norwegian
- Born: 27 April 1989 (age 37) Porsgrunn, Norway

Sport
- Sport: Para-cycling
- Disability class: H4
Medal record
Women's Para-cycling
Representing Norway
Road World Championships
Silver medal – second place	2022 Baie-Comeau	Road time trial H4
Silver medal – second place	2022 Baie-Comeau	Road race H4
Bronze medal – third place	2023 Glasgow	Road race H4
Road European Championships
Silver medal – second place	2022 Upper Austria	Road race H4
Silver medal – second place	2023 Rotterdam	Road race H4

Suzanna Tangen (born 27 April 1989) is a Norwegian para-cyclist who represents the Grenland Sykleklubb. She competes in the H4 category.

During the Idrettsgallaen 2023, she was nominated for the award for "breakthrough of the year" and the Idrettsgallaen 2024, she was nominated for the award "female para athlete of the year".

== Background ==
At the age of 2, Tangen contracted inflammation of the spinal cord which caused temporary paralysis. She got better but the strength in her legs remained weak. She is one of 13 siblings and grew up in Porsgrunn. At the age of 20, she took part in the Lars Monsen series on NRK, "Ingen Grenser".

Since 2015, Tangen has lived and trained in Calgary, Alberta, Canada.

== Sporting career ==
Tangen has also been active in alpine skiing through the use of sit-skis, but as a competitive athlete she focuses on paracycling. She has won medals from both the World Championships and European Championships.

In 2022, Tangen won a silver medal in the road race at the European Championships in Austria and later that year two silvers during the World Championships in Baie-Comeau, Canada. On 12 August 2023, she won bronze in the 46.8 km (29.1 mi) road race in the H4 class in paracycling during the World Championships in Glasgow. During the European Championships in Rotterdam in August 2023, Tangen won silver, again in the road race.
