= H3 (classification) =

Para-cycling classification

H3 is a para-cycling classification. The UCI recommends this be coded as MH3 or WH3.

== Definition ==
Union Cycliste Internationale (UCI) defines H3 as:
H3.1 (ex-H2.1)

- Paraplegic with impairments corresponding to a complete lesion from Th1 to Th3
- Very limited trunk stability
- Impaired sympathetic nerve system
- Non-spinal cord injury, but functional ability profile equivalent to sport class H3.1 (ex-H2.1)
- Recumbent position in handbike mandatory (AP-bikes).

H3.2 (ex-H2.2)

- Paraplegic with impairments corresponding to a complete lesion from Th4 to Th10
- Limited trunk stability
- Non-spinal cord injury, functional ability profile equivalent to sport class H3.2 (ex-H2.2)
- Recumbent position in handbike mandatory (AP-bikes)
- Moderate quadriplegia with/without athetosis/ataxia
- Severe hemiplegia (non-ambulant)
- Severe diplegia (non-ambulant) and athetosis/ataxia
- Neurological impairments with at least grade 1 spasticity in upper limb.

== The cycle ==
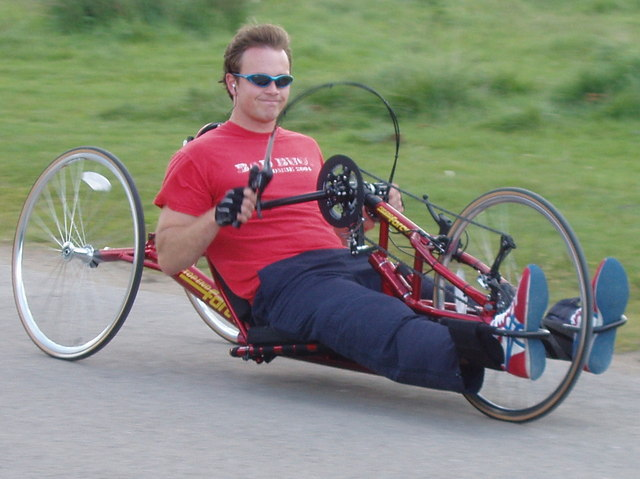
An AP2 handcycle

This classification can use an AP2 recumbent, which is a competition cycle that is reclined at 30 degrees and has a rigid frame. This classification can also use an AP3 hand cycle which is inclined at 0 degrees and is reclined on a rigid competition frame. The classification can also use an ATP2 cycle which is a long seated forward cycle on a rigid frame.

== Classification history ==
Cycling first became a Paralympic sport at the 1988 Summer Paralympics. In September 2006, governance for para-cycling passed from the International Paralympic Committee's International Cycling Committee to UCI at a meeting in Switzerland. When this happened, the responsibility of classifying the sport also changed.

For the 2016 Summer Paralympics in Rio, the International Paralympic Committee had a zero classification at the Games policy. This policy was put into place in 2014, with the goal of avoiding last minute changes in classes that would negatively impact athlete training preparations. All competitors needed to be internationally classified with their classification status confirmed prior to the Games, with exceptions to this policy being dealt with on a case-by-case basis.

== Rankings ==
This classification has UCI rankings for elite competitors.

== Competitors ==
Competitors in this class include Rafał Wilk (Poland), Joël Jeannot (France), Nigel Barley (Australia), Sandra Graf (Switzerland) and Monica Bascio (United States).

== Becoming classified ==
Classification is handled by Union Cycliste Internationale. Classification for the UCI Para-Cycling World Championships is completed by at least two classification panels. Members of the classification panel must not have a relationship with the cyclist and must not be involved in the World Championships in any other role than as classifier. In national competitions, the classification is handled by the national cycling federation. Classification often has three components: physical, technical and observation assessment.

== See also ==
- Para-cycling classification
- Cycling at the Summer Paralympics
