= European Para Championships =

Multi-sport event

- Purpose: Multi-sport event for athletes with physical disabilities from nations on the European continent
- Frequency: Every 4 years
- Inaugurated: 2023 European Para Championships Rotterdam, Netherlands
- Most recent: 2023 European Para Championships Rotterdam, Netherlands
- Rights holder: European Para Championships BV
- Headquarters: Oss, Netherlands
- Website: https://europeanparachampionships.com/

The European Para Championships is a multi-sport event contested by para-athletes from European nations. The championships have been awarded the status of regional games by the European Paralympic Committee and offer qualification opportunities for the Paralympic Games. The Championships are partly analogous with the European Games, taking place a year before the Paralympic Games and endorsed by the EPC, and with the European Championships in that they represent a combination of selected European championships in different sports.

== History ==
The event is founded by Eric Kersten from the Netherlands. In 2019, he started with the idea of combining different European Championships in parasports after his company Team TOC organized the World Archery Championships back to back with the World Para Archery Championships in the city centre of Den Bosch.

== Editions ==
The championships are planned to be held on a four-year cycle, taking place in the year proceeding the Summer Paralympic Games. The first edition of the championships was held in August 2023 in Rotterdam, Netherlands. As of February 2024, Turkey and Germany are bidding to host the 2027 edition. In November 2025, it was announced that the 2027 event would be held in Geneva, Switzerland.

Number	Year	Host	Sports	Events	Nations	Athletes	Top placed team
1	2023	Rotterdam, Netherlands	10	144	42	1,500	France
2	2027	Geneva, Switzerland					

== Sports ==
=== 2023 ===
The sports contested at the first European Para Championships are: para archery, para badminton, boccia, para cycling, goalball, para judo, para shooting, para taekwondo, wheelchair basketball, and wheelchair tennis.

=== 2027 ===
The programmed sports for the second European Para Championships were: (returning) boccia, goalball, para taekwondo, para archery, para badminton, wheelchair tennis, para judo; (new) 3×3 Wheelchair basketball, para table tennis, wheelchair rugby, para climbing and blind football.

Sports from 2023 that have been dropped from the 2027 program are para cycling and shooting para sport.

== See also ==
- European Games
- European Championships (multi-sport event)
- European Youth Olympic Festival
- European Para Youth Games
- Paralympic Games
  - African Para Games
  - Asian Para Games
  - Parapan American Games
- World Para Athletics European Championships
- World Para Swimming European Championships
