= 2023 European Para Championships =

First European Para Championships

- Logo
- Host city: Rotterdam, Netherlands
- Nations: 42
- Athletes: 1500
- Events: 144 in 10 sports
- Opening: 8 August 2023
- Closing: 20 August 2023
- Opened by: Andrew Parsons
- Main venue: Rotterdam Ahoy

The 2023 European Para Championships were the first edition of the European Para Championships held between 8 and 20 August 2023 in Rotterdam, Netherlands.

== Sports ==
The following competitions took place:

2023 European Para Championships Sports Programme
- Archery (16 or 17)
- Badminton (20)
- Boccia (11)
- Cycling (51)
- Goalball (1)
- Judo (18)
- Shooting (9)
- Taekwondo (10 or 11)
- Wheelchair basketball (2)
- Wheelchair tennis (6)

== Venues ==
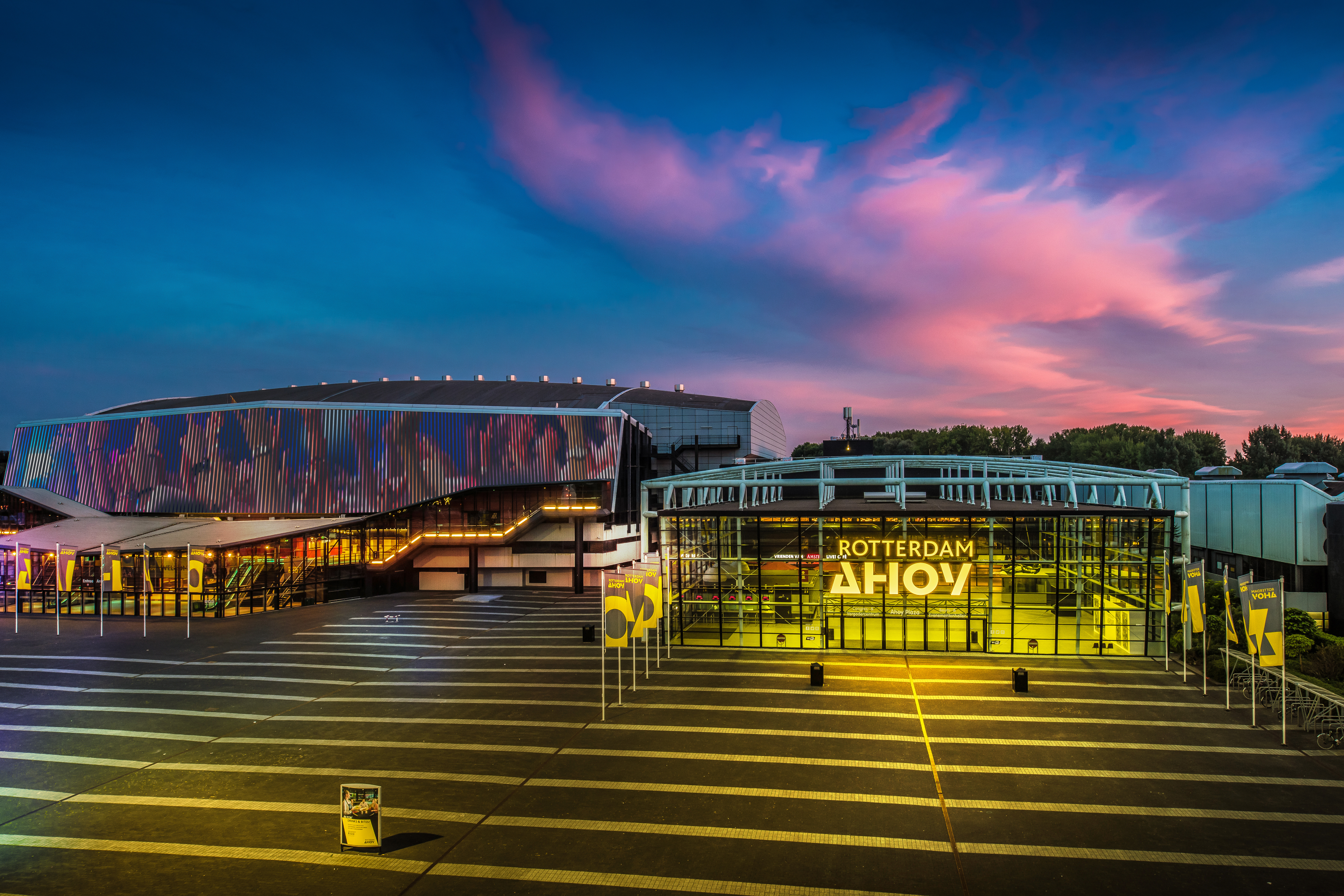
Rotterdam Ahoy

Events will be held at the following venuses:

Venue	Sports
Rotterdam Ahoy	Badminton; Boccia; Cycling; Goalball; Judo; Shooting; Taekwondo; Wheelchair basketball
Kop van Zuid	Para Archery
Schouwburgplein	Wheelchair Tennis

== Schedule ==
Sports	August 2023													Events
Sports	Tues 8	Wed 9	Thurs 10	Fri 11	Sat 12	Sun 13	Mon 14	Tues 15	Wed 16	Thurs 17	Fri 18	Sat 19	Sun 20	Events
Archery								●	●	●	1	4	9	16
Badminton								●	●	●	●	●	20	20
Boccia	●	●	●	●	8	3								11
Cycling														51
Goalball			●	●	●									1
Judo														18
Shooting														9
Taekwondo														10
Wheelchair basketball				●	●	●	●	●	●	●				2
Wheelchair tennis	●	●	●	●										6
Total gold medal events	7	9	1	0										144
Cumulative total	7	16	17	17									144	144

●	Competition round	Final

== Medal table (Incorrect) ==
* Host nation (Netherlands)

Rank	Nation	Gold	Silver	Bronze	Total
1	France	25	17	25	67
2	Italy	19	13	16	48
3	Netherlands*	17	10	6	33
4	Turkey	16	16	20	52
5	Great Britain	9	15	16	40
6	Switzerland	8	4	3	15
7	Spain	7	14	14	35
8	Germany	7	9	6	22
9	Ukraine	7	8	8	23
10	Poland	6	10	8	24
11	Azerbaijan	4	4	5	13
12	Georgia	4	3	9	16
13	Czech Republic	4	2	6	12
14	Austria	2	4	7	13
15	Portugal	2	3	7	12
16	Slovakia	2	3	1	6
17	Greece	2	2	3	7
18	Belgium	2	2	1	5
19	Croatia	2	0	0	2
19	International Paralympic Committee	2	0	0	2
19	Moldova	2	0	0	2
22	Israel	1	3	6	10
23	Sweden	1	3	2	6
24	Serbia	1	2	0	3
25	Romania	1	0	0	1
25	Slovenia	1	0	0	1
27	Hungary	0	2	2	4
28	Norway	0	2	0	2
29	Denmark	0	1	2	3
30	Cyprus	0	1	0	1
30	Lithuania	0	1	0	1
32	Andorra	0	0	1	1
32	Bulgaria	0	0	1	1
32	Finland	0	0	1	1
32	Latvia	0	0	1	1
Totals (35 entries)		154	154	177	485

- One title was won by a united judo team and one title by an athlete under the auspices of the international taekwendo federation.

== Participating nations ==
42 nations, and a number of neutral athletes, competed:

Participating National Paralympic Committees
- Albania
- Armenia
- Austria
- Azerbaijan
- Belgium
- Bosnia and Herzegovina
- Bulgaria
- Croatia
- Cyprus
- Czech Republic
- Denmark
- Estonia
- Finland
- France
- (Georgia (country)) Georgia
- Germany
- (United Kingdom) Great Britain
- Greece
- Hungary
- (International Paralympic Committee) Independent Paralympic Athletes
- Iceland
- (Republic of Ireland) Ireland
- Israel
- Italy
- Latvia
- Lithuania
- Luxembourg
- Moldova
- Montenegro
- Netherlands (host)
- North Macedonia
- Norway
- Poland
- Portugal
- Romania
- Serbia
- Slovakia
- Slovenia
- Spain
- Sweden
- Switzerland
- Turkey
- Ukraine

== See also ==
- 2023 European Games
