= UCI Para-cycling Road World Championships =

Cycling event

The UCI Para-cycling Road World Championships are the world championships for road cycling where athletes with a physical disability compete, organized by the Union Cycliste Internationale (UCI).

The Championships were earlier administered by the International Paralympic Committee. The UCI and the IPC organized the 2006 IPC Cycling World Championships, combined track and road event.

The 1994, 1998, 2002 and 2007 IPC World Championships combined track and road events.

== Championships ==
Year	City	Country	Date	No. of events	No. of athletes
2009	Bogogno	Italy	10–13 September		
2010	Baie-Comeau	Canada	19–22 August		
2011	Roskilde	Denmark	8–11 September		
2013	Baie-Comeau	Canada	29 August – 1 September		
2014	Greenville	United States	29 August – 1 September		
2015	Nottwil	Switzerland	29 July – 2 August	5	289
2017	Pietermaritzburg	South Africa	31 August – 3 September		
2018	Maniago	Italy	2–5 August		
2019	Emmen	Netherlands	11–15 September	6	
2020	Ostend	Belgium	Cancelled due to COVID-19 pandemic		
2021	Cascais	Portugal	9–13 June	51	270
2022	Baie-Comeau	Canada	11–14 August	53	243
2023	Glasgow (Note: As part of the 2023 UCI Cycling World Championships)	United Kingdom	3–13 August		
2024	Zürich (Note: Alongside the 2024 UCI Road World Championships)	Switzerland	21–29 September		
2025	Ronse	Belgium	28–31 August	53	328
2026	Huntsville	United States			

== Medals ==
Updated after 2026 UCI Para-cycling World Championships

Rank	Nation	Gold	Silver	Bronze	Total
1	Italy	97	63	59	219
2	Germany	90	83	78	251
3	United States	90	69	59	218
4	Netherlands	78	44	41	163
5	France	71	62	51	184
6	Great Britain	57	42	45	144
7	Australia	47	47	43	137
8	Spain	40	60	46	146
9	Switzerland	35	37	22	94
10	Canada	32	21	31	84
11	China	24	23	18	65
12	Ireland	20	10	8	38
13	Poland	19	29	26	74
14	Austria	18	19	27	64
15	Belgium	18	11	17	46
16	South Africa	12	17	7	36
17	Czech Republic	11	23	52	86
18	Sweden	8	3	4	15
19	Brazil	6	12	24	42
20	Japan	6	6	5	17
21	Russia	5	25	14	44
22	New Zealand	5	14	12	31
23	Colombia	5	13	17	35
24	Slovakia	5	7	9	21
25	Ukraine	4	6	3	13
26	Romania	4	5	1	10
27	Uzbekistan	3	5	3	11
28	Denmark	3	2	6	11
29	Venezuela	3	0	2	5
30	Belarus	2	0	2	4
31	South Korea	1	7	3	11
32	Croatia	1	5	0	6
33	Peru	1	0	2	3
34	Iran	1	0	0	1
35	RPC	0	6	4	10
36	Norway	0	4	4	8
37	Thailand	0	4	2	6
38	Mexico	0	2	0	2
39	Finland	0	1	5	6
40	Israel	0	1	2	3
41	Argentina	0	1	1	2
42	Lebanon	0	1	0	1
43	Portugal	0	0	2	2
44	Dominican Republic	0	0	1	1
44	Greece	0	0	1	1
44	Malaysia	0	0	1	1
Totals (46 entries)		822	790	760	2,372

== Events ==
- C1-C5 : Time Trial and Road Race – Men and Women
- B : Time Trial and Road Race – Men and Women
- H1-H5 : Time Trial and Road Race – Men and Women

== See also ==
- UCI Road World Championships
- UCI Para-cycling Track World Championships
- Cycling at the Summer Paralympics
