= Cycling at the 2024 Summer Paralympics – Men's road race H1–2 =

Men's road race H1-2 at the XVII Paralympic Games
- Venue: Clichy-sous-Bois
- Dates: 5 September
- Competitors: 12 from 11 nations
- Winning time: 1:20:18

Medalists
1st place, gold medalist(s)		Florian Jouanny	France
2nd place, silver medalist(s)		Sergio Garrote	Spain
3rd place, bronze medalist(s)		Luca Mazzone	Italy

The men's road race H1-2 cycling event at the 2024 Summer Paralympics took place on 5 September 2024 in Clichy-sous-Bois in Seine-Saint-Denis, Paris, France. 11 riders competed in the event.

The event covered the following two classifications, both of which used hand-operated bicycles:

- H1: tetraplegics with severe upper limb impairment to the C6 vertebra.
- H2: tetraplegics with minor upper limb impairment from C7 thru T3.

== Schedule ==
F	Finals

Men's Road Race
Event↓/Date →	5 September	6 September	7 September
B		F	
H1-2	F		
H3	F		
H4	F		
H5	F		
C1-3			F
C4-5		F	
T1-2			F

== Results ==
This race covered two classifications, H1 and H2. However, it was not a factored event.

Rank	Rider	Nationality	Class	Time	Notes
1st place, gold medalist(s)	Florian Jouanny	France	(H2)	1:20:18	
2nd place, silver medalist(s)	Sergio Garrote	Spain	(H2)	1:20:40	
3rd place, bronze medalist(s)	Luca Mazzone	Italy	(H2)	1:27:58	
4	Rory Mead	New Zealand	(H2)	1:40:34	
5	Cody Wills	United States	(H2)	1:50:59	
6	Benjamin Frueh	Switzerland	(H1)	-1LAP	
–	Maxime Hordies	Belgium	(H1)	DNF	
–	Fabrizio Cornegliani	Italy	(H1)	DNF	
–	Nicolas Pieter du Preez	South Africa	(H1)	DNF	
–	Amit Hasdai	Israel	(H2)	DNF	
–	Patrik Jahoda	Czech Republic	(H1)	DNS	
