= 2019 UCI Para-cycling Road World Championships =

- Venue: Emmen, Netherlands
- Date(s): 11–15 September 2019
- Nations participating: 49
- Cyclists participating: 416
- Events: 53

The 2019 UCI Para-cycling Road World Championships was the ninth edition of the World Championships for road cycling for athletes with a physical disability. The Championships took place in Emmen in The Netherlands from 11 to 15 September 2019.

== Medalists ==
| Event | Class | Gold | | Silver | | Bronze | |
|---|---|---|---|---|---|---|---|
Men's events
| 10.4 km time trial | H1 | Fabrizio Cornegliani; Italy | 20' 37.88" | Maxime Hordies; Belgium | + 1' 26.41" | Pieter du Preez; South Africa | + 1' 29.40" |
| 20.8 km time trial | T1 | Jianxin Chen; China | 36' 38.64" | Maximilian Jager; Germany | + 37.81" | Giorgio Farroni; Italy | + 1' 44.61" |
| 20.8 km time trial | T2 | Hans-Peter Durst; Germany | 34' 06.93" | Stuart Jones; Australia | + 15.68" | Ryan Boyle; United States | + 54.02" |
| 20.8 km time trial | H2 | Luca Mazzone; Italy | 33' 03.98" | Sergio Garrote; Spain | + 1.54" | William Groulx; United States | + 47.22" |
| 20.8 km time trial | H3 | Vico Merklein; Germany | 29' 49.20" | Paolo Cecchetto; Italy | + 44.18" | Walter Ablinger; Austria | + 59.67" |
| 20.8 km time trial | H4 | Jetze Plat; Netherlands | 28' 03.81" | Thomas Davis; United States | + 26.64" | Thomas Frühwirth; Austria | + 1' 14.32" |
| 20.8 km time trial | H5 | Alessandro Zanardi; Italy | 29' 37.84" | Tim de Vries; Netherlands | + 4.32" | Oscar Sanchez; United States | + 27.31" |
| 20.8 km time trial | C1 | Aaron Keith; United States | 29' 30.71" | Michael Teuber; Germany | +31.03" | Ross Wilson; Canada | + 53.68" |
| 20.8 km time trial | C2 | Darren Hicks; Australia | 28' 24.53" | Ewoud Vromant; Belgium | + 22.33" | Tristen Chernove; Canada | + 47.32" |
| 31.2 km time trial | C3 | David Nicholas; Australia | 41' 25.70" | Matthias Schindler; Germany | + 1' 01.44" | Benjamin Watson; Great Britain | + 1' 14.35" |
| 31.2 km time trial | C4 | Jozef Metelka; Slovakia | 40' 50.58" | Sergei Pudov; Russia | + 18.08" | Carol-Eduard Novak; Romania | + 47.71" |
| 31.2 km time trial | C5 | Alistair Donohoe; Australia | 39' 22.52" | Daniel Abraham; Netherlands | + 1.77" | Lauro Chaman; Brazil | + 8.63" |
| 31.2 km time trial | Tandem B | Netherlands; Vincent ter Schure; Timo Fransen (pilot) | 36' 17.29 | Great Britain; Stephen Bate; Adam Duggleby (pilot) | + 27.21" | Poland; Marcin Polak; Michał Ładosz (pilot) | + 45.27" |
| 22.2 km road race | T1 | Jianxin Chen; China | 45' 47" | Maximilian Jager; Germany | + 2" | Giorgio Farroni; Italy | + 8" |
| 29.6 km road race | T2 | Ryan Boyle; United States | 52' 57" | Hans-Peter Durst; Germany | + 5" | Stephen Hills; New Zealand | + 13" |
| 51.8 km road race | H1 | Maxime Hordies; Belgium | 1h 33' 23" | Fabrizio Cornegliani; Italy | + 4' 49" | Teppo Polvi; Finland | + 14' 04" |
| 51.8 km road race | H2 | Luca Mazzone; Italy | 1h 33' 23" | Sergio Garrote; Spain | s.t. | William Groulx; United States | + 10" |
| 66.6 km road race | H3 | Vico Merklein; Germany | 1h 43' 53" | Jean-Francois Deberg; Belgium | s.t. | Luis Miguel García-Marquina; Spain | s.t. |
| 66.6 km road race | H4 | Jetze Plat; Netherlands | 1h 39' 01" | Thomas Davis; United States | s.t. | Travis Gaertner; United States | s.t. |
| 66.6 km road race | H5 | Tim de Vries; Netherlands | 1h 46' 22" | Alessandro Zanardi; Italy | s.t. | Qiangli Liu; China | s.t. |
| 66.6 km road race | C1 | Ricardo Ten; Spain | 1h 39' 44" | Pierre Senska; Germany | + 14" | Aaron Keith; United States | + 27" |
| 66.6 km road race | C2 | Alexandre Léauté; France | 1h 39' 48" | Arslan Gilmutdinov; Russia | s.t. | Ewoud Vromant; Belgium | s.t. |
| 66.6 km road race | C3 | Steffen Warias; Germany | 1h 39' 46" | Jaco van Gass; Great Britain | s.t. | Eduardo Santas Asensio; Spain | s.t. |
| 88.8 km road race | C4 | Guoping Wei; China | 2h 03' 50" | Sergei Pudov; Russia | s.t. | Patrik Kuril; Slovakia | s.t. |
| 88.8 km road race | C5 | Andrea Tarlao; Italy | 2h 02' 54" | Martin van de Pol; Netherlands | + 20" | Alistair Donohoe; Australia | s.t. |
| 103.6 km road race | Tandem B | Netherlands; Tristan Bangma; Patrick Bos (pilot) | 2h 16' 14" | Spain; Adolfo Bellido Guerrero; Noel Martin (pilot) | s.t. | Netherlands; Marcin Polak; Michał Ładosz (pilot) | s.t. |
Women's events
| 10.4 km time trial | H1 | Emilie Miller; Australia | 43' 42.02" | | | | |
| 10.4 km time trial | H2 | Roberta Amadeo; Italy | 21' 29.89" | Carmen Koedood; Netherlands | + 1' 56.31" | | |
| 20.8 km time trial | H3 | Alicia Dana; United States | 34' 41.15" | Renata Kałuża; Poland | + 33.15" | Anna Oroszova; Slovakia | + 57.70" |
| 20.8 km time trial | H4 | Jennette Jansen; Netherlands | 33' 12.11" | Doyeon Lee; South Korea | + 1' 46.81" | Sandra Graf; Switzerland | + 2' 20.10" |
| 20.8 km time trial | H5 | Andrea Eskau; Germany | 34' 47.48" | Oksana Masters; United States | + 28.63" | Chantal Haenen; Netherlands | + 3' 33.39" |
| 20.8 km time trial | T1 | Eltje Malzbender; New Zealand | 44' 56.16" | Yulia Sibagatova; Russia | + 1' 31.82" | Shelley Gautier; Canada | + 1' 52.94" |
| 20.8 km time trial | T2 | Carol Cooke; Australia | 38' 11.66" | Jill Walsh; United States | + 1' 01.71" | Marie-Ève Croteau; Canada | + 1' 49.74" |
| 20.8 km time trial | C1 | Sini Chen; China | 34' 15.58" | Sarah Ellington; New Zealand | + 47.15" | Daniela Munévar; Colombia | + 1' 39.02" |
| 20.8 km time trial | C2 | Qian Wangwei; China | 37' 27.31" | Katie Toft; Great Britain | + 31.95" | Kaitlyn Schurmann; Australia | + 3' 00.78" |
| 20.8 km time trial | C3 | Paige Greco; Australia | 32' 10.93" | Keiko Sugiura; Japan | + 2.48" | Clara Brown; United States | + 35.53" |
| 20.8 km time trial | C4 | Emily Petricola; Australia | 30' 55.57" | Shawn Morelli; United States | + 32.81" | Meg Lemon; Australia | + 1' 28.07" |
| 20.8 km time trial | C5 | Sarah Storey; Great Britain | 29' 41.90" | Anna Harkowska; Poland | + 58.03" | Kerstin Brachtendorf; Germany | + 1' 12.99" |
| 31.2 km time trial | Tandem B | Ireland; Katie-George Dunlevy; Eve McCrystal (pilot) | 41' 02.51" | New Zealand; Emma Foy; Hannah Van Kampen (pilot) | + 55.28" | Great Britain; Lora Fachie; Corrine Hall (pilot) | + 1' 09.03" |
| 22.2 km road race | T1 | Eltje Malzbender; New Zealand | 51' 46" | Shelley Gautier; Canada | + 12" | Yulia Sibagatova; Russia | + 6' 02" |
| 29.6 km road race | T2 | Carol Cooke; Australia | 59' 47" | Angelika Dreock-Käser; Germany | + 1" | Jana Majunke; Germany | + 26" |
| 29.6 km road race | H1 | Emilie Miller; Australia | 1h 32' 46" | | | | |
| 29.6 km road race | H2 | Roberta Amadeo; Italy | 1h 07' 13" | Carmen Koedood; Netherlands | DNF | | |
| 51.8 km road race | H3 | Annika Zeyen; Germany | 1h 37' 41" | Alicia Dana; United States | + 1" | Renata Kałuża; Poland | + 1" |
| 51.8 km road race | H4 | Jennette Jansen; Netherlands | 1h 33' 48" | Sandra Graf; Switzerland | + 1' 36" | Doyeon Lee; South Korea | + 2' 31" |
| 51.8 km road race | H5 | Andrea Eskau; Germany | 1h 38' 27" | Oksana Masters; United States | s.t. | Chantal Haenen; Netherlands | + 16' 26" |
| 51.8 km road race | C1 | Qian Wangwei; China | 1h 37' 00" | Katie Toft; Great Britain | + 14" | Kaitlyn Schurmann; Australia | + 4' 34" |
| 51.8 km road race | C2 | Maike Hausberger; Germany | 1h 36' 52" | Daniela Munévar; Colombia | + 2" | Sini Zeng; China | + 2" |
| 51.8 km road race | C3 | Wang Xiaomei; China | 1h 36' 47" | Keiko Sugiura; Japan | s.t. | Clara Brown; United States | s.t. |
| 66.6 km road race | C4 | Shawn Morelli; United States | 1h 50' 05" | Jianping Ruan; China | + 1' 43" | Meg Lemon; Australia | + 1' 44" |
| 66.6 km road race | C5 | Sarah Storey; Great Britain | 1h 49' 14" | Kerstin Brachtendorf; Germany | + 1" | Samantha Bosco; United States | + 1" |
| 81.4 km road race | Tandem B | Ireland; Emma Foy; Hannah Van Kampen (pilot) | 2h 07' 39" | Ireland; Katie-George Dunlevy; Eve McCrystal (pilot) | s.t. | Poland; Justyna Kiryla; Aleksandra Tecław (pilot) | + 2" |
Mixed events
| Team Relay | H1-5 | Italy; Paolo Cecchetto (H3); Luca Mazzone (H2); Alessandro Zanardi (H5) | 21' 28" | United States; William Groulx (H2); Brandon Lyons (H3); Thomas Davis (H4) | + 14" | Germany; Annika Zeyen (H3); Bernd Jeffré (H4); Vico Merklein (H3) | + 29" |

== Medal table ==
25 nations won medals

| Rank | Nation | Gold | Silver | Bronze | Total |
|---|---|---|---|---|---|
| 1 | Australia | 9 | 1 | 5 | 15 |
| 2 | Germany | 8 | 8 | 3 | 19 |
| 3 | Italy | 8 | 3 | 2 | 13 |
| 4 | Netherlands | 7 | 4 | 2 | 13 |
| 5 | China | 7 | 1 | 2 | 10 |
| 6 | United States | 4 | 8 | 9 | 21 |
| 7 | New Zealand | 3 | 2 | 1 | 6 |
| 8 | Great Britain | 2 | 4 | 2 | 8 |
| 9 | Spain | 1 | 3 | 2 | 6 |
| 10 | Belgium | 1 | 3 | 1 | 5 |
| 11 | Ireland | 1 | 1 | 0 | 2 |
| 12 | Slovakia | 1 | 0 | 2 | 3 |
| 13 | France | 1 | 0 | 0 | 1 |
| 14 | Russia | 0 | 4 | 1 | 5 |
| 15 | Poland | 0 | 2 | 4 | 6 |
| 16 | Japan | 0 | 2 | 0 | 2 |
| 17 | Canada | 0 | 1 | 4 | 5 |
| 18 | Colombia | 0 | 1 | 1 | 2 |
| 18 | South Korea | 0 | 1 | 1 | 2 |
| 18 | Switzerland | 0 | 1 | 1 | 2 |
| 21 | Austria | 0 | 0 | 2 | 2 |
| 22 | Brazil | 0 | 0 | 1 | 1 |
| 22 | Finland | 0 | 0 | 1 | 1 |
| 22 | Romania | 0 | 0 | 1 | 1 |
| 22 | South Africa | 0 | 0 | 1 | 1 |
| Totals (25 entries) | | 53 | 50 | 49 | 152 |

== Participating nations ==
49 nations

- Argentina (2)
- Azerbaijan (1)
- Australia (13)
- Austria (9)
- Belgium (15)
- Belarus (2)
- Brazil (6)
- Canada (11)
- Colombia (13)
- Cyprus (3)
- Czech Republic (10)
- Denmark (3)
- Estonia (2)
- Finland (7)
- France (12)
- Germany (22)
- Great Britain (15)
- Greece (8)
- Guyana (1)
- Hungary (8)
- India (4)
- Ireland (11)
- Israel (1)
- Italy (18)
- Japan (5)
- South Korea(1)
- Latvia (2)
- Luxembourg (1)
- Malaysia (7)
- Mexico (10)
- Netherlands (20)
- New Zealand (8)
- Norway (1)
- China (18)
- Peru (1)
- Poland (23)
- Portugal (4)
- Romania (3)
- Russia (22)
- Slovakia (7)
- Slovenia (6)
- South Africa (5)
- Spain (20)
- Sweden (6)
- Switzerland (10)
- Thailand (15)
- Ukraine (2)
- United Arab Emirates (1)
- United States (21)
