= Cycling at the 2020 Summer Paralympics – Men's road race H1–2 =

Men's road race H1-2 at the XVI Paralympic Games
- Venue: Fuji Speedway
- Dates: 1 September
- Competitors: 14 from 12 nations

Medalists
| 1st place, gold medalist(s) | | Florian Jouanny | France |
| 2nd place, silver medalist(s) | | Luca Mazzone | Italy |
| 3rd place, bronze medalist(s) | | Sergio Garrote Munoz | Spain |

The men's road race H1-2 cycling event at the 2020 Summer Paralympics took place on 1 September 2021, at the Fuji Speedway in Tokyo. 14 riders competed in the event.

The event covers the following two classifications, all of which uses hand-operated bicycles:

- H1: tetraplegics with severe upper limb impairment to the C6 vertebra.
- H2: tetraplegics with minor upper limb impairment from C7 thru T3.

== Results ==
The event took place on 1 September 2021, at 9:35:

| Rank | Rider | Nationality | Class | Time | Deficit |
|---|---|---|---|---|---|
| 1st place, gold medalist(s) | Florian Jouanny | France | H2 | 1:49:36 | |
| 2nd place, silver medalist(s) | Luca Mazzone | Italy | H2 | 1:53:43 | +4:07 |
| 3rd place, bronze medalist(s) | Sergio Garrote Munoz | Spain | H2 | 1:54:36 | +5:00 |
| 4 | Tobias Fankhauser | Switzerland | H2 | 2:23:08 | +33:32 |
| 5 | Rory Mead | New Zealand | H2 | 2:23:08 | +33:32 |
| 6 | Maxime Hordies | Belgium | H1 | -1LAP | |
| 7 | Teppo Polvi | Finland | H1 | -1LAP | |
| 8 | Pieter du Preez | South Africa | H1 | -1LAP | |
| 9 | Phongchai Yanaruedee | Thailand | H2 | -2LAP | |
| | Patrik Jahoda | Czech Republic | H1 | DNF | |
| | Fabrizio Cornegliani | Italy | H1 | DNF | |
| | Ernst Bachmaier | Austria | H1 | DNS | |
| | Harri Sopanen | Finland | H1 | DNS | |
| | Will Groulx | United States | H2 | DNS | |
