= 2018 UCI Para-cycling Road World Championships =

- Venue: Maniago, Italy
- Date(s): 2–5 August 2018
- Nations participating: 45
- Cyclists participating: 343
- Events: 52

The 2018 UCI Para-cycling Road World Championships was the eighth edition of the World Championships for road cycling for athletes with a physical disability. The Championships took place in Maniago in Italy from 2 to 5 August 2018.

== Medalists ==
Event	Class	Gold		Silver		Bronze	
Men's events
13.6 km time trial	H1	Fabrizio Cornegliani; Italy	31:11.88	Nicolaas Pieter Du Preez; South Africa	+15.23	Benjamin Fruh; Switzerland	+2:35.00
13.6 km time trial	H2	Luca Mazzone; Italy	23:14.14	William Groulx; United States	+27.54	Sergio Garrote; Spain	+1:03.04
13.6 km time trial	H3	Federico Mestroni; Italy	21:07.63	Paolo Cecchetto; Italy	+4.57	Alex Hyndman; Canada	+12.95
13.6 km time trial	H4	Jetze Plat; Netherlands	19:20.08	Krystian Giera; Poland	+54.24	Rafal Wilk; Poland	+1:44.55
13.6 km time trial	T1	Giorgio Farroni; Italy	25:05.00	Jianxin Chen; China	+14.34	Gonzalo Garcia Abella; Spain	+16.99
13.6 km time trial	T2	Ryan Boyle; United States	22:13.83	Craig McCann; United Kingdom	+44.38	Joan Reinoso Figuerola; Spain	+58.82
13.6 km time trial	C1	Michael Teuber; Germany	19:27.43	Ross Wilson; Canada	+2.12	Ricardo Ten Argiles; Spain	+8.30
13.6 km time trial	C2	Arslan Gilmutdinov; Russia	18:32.79	Tristen Chernove; Canada	+5.57	Alejandro Perea; Colombia	+8.10
27.2 km time trial	H5	Oscar Sanchez; United States	39:10.02	Tim de Vries; Netherlands	+5.71	Alessandro Zanardi; Italy	+1:01.39
27.2 km time trial	C3	Michael Sametz; Canada	35:20.29	Matthias Schindler; Germany	+1:26.37	Benjamin Watson; Great Britain	+1:30.43
27.2 km time trial	C4	Jozef Metelka; Slovakia	33:50.26	Sergei Pudov; Russia	+1:15.08	Kyle Bridgwood; Australia	+1:55.66
27.2 km time trial	C5	Daniel Abraham; Netherlands	33:26.80	Lauro Chaman; Brazil	+41.17	Yehor Dementyev; Ukraine	+48.28
27.2 km time trial	Tandem B	Great Britain; Stephen Bate; Adam Duggleby (pilot)	31:31.76	Netherlands; Vincent ter Schure; Timo Fransen (pilot)	+0.55	Poland; Marcin Polak; Michał Ładosz (pilot)	+21.87
27.2 km road race	T1	Giorgio Farroni; Italy	0:57:04	Maximilian Jager; Germany	s.t.	Gonzalo Garcia Abella; Spain	+ 00:05
40.8 km road race	T2	Ryan Boyle; United States	1:13:35	Joan Reinoso Figuerola; Spain	+ 00:49	Néstor Javier Ayala; Colombia	+ 01:06
40.8 km road race	H1	Fabrizio Cornegliani; Italy	1:41:10	Nicolaas Pieter Du Preez; South Africa	+ 01:49	Harri Sopanen; Finland	+ 05:12
54.4 km road race	H2	William Groulx; United States	1:40:43	Luca Mazzone; Italy	s.t.	Sergio Garrote Muñoz; Spain	+ 00:54
68.0 km road race	H3	Jean-Francois Deberg; Belgium	1:52:23	Riadh Tarsim; France	s.t.	David Franek; France	s.t.
68.0 km road race	H4	Jetze Plat; Netherlands	1:40:35	Rafal Wilk; Poland	+ 00:05	Vico Merklein; Germany	+ 04:40
68.0 km road race	H5	Tim de Vries; Netherlands	1:46:17	Oscar Sanchez; United States	+ 01:26	Mitch Valize; Netherlands	+ 01:44
68.0 km road race	C1	Pierre Senska; Germany	1:49:09	Ricardo Ten Argiles; Spain	s.t.	Zhangyu Li; China	+ 00:03
68.0 km road race	C2	Tristen Chernove; Canada	1:45:30	Alejandro Perea; Colombia	s.t.	Darren Hicks; Australia	s.t.
68.0 km road race	C3	Kris Bosmans; Belgium	1:45:13	Fabio Anobile; Italy	+ 00:02	Sergey Ustinov; Russia	s.t.
81.6 km road race	C4	Michele Pittacolo; Italy	1:52:00	Sergei Pudov; Russia	s.t.	Louis Clincke; Belgium	s.t.
81.6 km road race	C5	Alistair Donohoe; Australia	1:51:20	Yehor Dementyev; Ukraine	+ 00:24	PierPaolo Addesi; Italy	s.t.
108.8 km road race	Tandem B	Spain; Ignacio Avila Rodriguez; Joan Font Bertoli (pilot)	02:18:02	Poland; Marcin Polak; Michał Ładosz (pilot)	s.t.	Spain; Adolfo Bellido Guerrero; Noel Martin (pilot)	+ 00:26
Women's events
13.6 km time trial	H1	Emilie Miller; Australia	58:15.25				
13.6 km time trial	H2	Carmen Koedood; Netherlands	37:38.89	Mikyoung Jeon; South Korea	+4:13.17		
13.6 km time trial	H3	Francesca Porcellato; Italy	23:36.57	Alicia Dana; United States	+27.28	Jady Martins Malavazzi; Brazil	+43.73
13.6 km time trial	H4	Jennette Jansen; Netherlands	23:30.05	Svetlana Moshkovich; Russia	+51.11	Sandra Graf; Switzerland	+1:10.78
13.6 km time trial	H5	Laura de Vaan; Netherlands	22:41.37	Andrea Eskau; Germany	+1:07.03	Ana Maria Vitelaru; Italy	+4:30.54
13.6 km time trial	T1	Shelley Gautier; Canada	31:09.85	Yulia Sibagatova; Russia	+1:55.86	Olga Tsybulskaia; Russia	+2:53.66
13.6 km time trial	T2	Jill Walsh; United States	25:13.22	Carol Cooke; Australia	+29.49	Jana Majunke; Germany	+41.79
13.6 km time trial	C1	Katie Toft; United Kingdom	25:01.85	Kaitlyn Schurmann; Australia	+2:12.97		
13.6 km time trial	C2	Sini Zeng; China	21:47.73	Keiko Noguchi; Japan	+19.70	Daniela Munévar; Colombia	+36.66
13.6 km time trial	C3	Anna Beck; Sweden	20:33.36	Denise Schindler; Germany	+1:01.77	Jamie Whitmore; United States	+1:02.77
13.6 km time trial	C4	Shawn Morelli; United States	20:48.86	Hannah MacDougall; Australia	+10.35	Meg Lemon; Australia	+30.98
13.6 km time trial	C5	Sarah Storey; Great Britain	18:53,62	Crystal Lane-Wright; United Kingdom	+38.91	Anna Harkowska; Poland	+39.15
27.2 km time trial	Tandem B	Ireland; Katie-George Dunlevy; Eve McCrystal (pilot)	35:26.37	Great Britain; Lora Fachie; Corrine Hall (pilot)	+17.01	Poland; Iwona Podkościelna; Aleksandra Teclaw (pilot)	+2:03.78
27.2 km road race	T1	Shelley Gautier; Canada	1:05:36	Yulia Sibagatova; Russia	+ 08:13	Olga Tsybulskaia; Russia	+ 13:41
27.2 km road race	T2	Jill Walsh; United States	0:56:10	Carol Cooke; Australia	+ 00:02	Jana Majunke; Germany	+ 00:57
27.2 km road race	H1	Emilie Miller; Australia	1:00:46				
27.2 km road race	H2	Carmen Koedood; Netherlands	1:20:47	Mikyoung Jeon; South Korea	+ 09:04		
54.4 km road race	H3	Francesca Porcellato; Italy	1:40:45	Alicia Dana; United States	s.t.	Jady Martins Malavazzi; Brazil	+ 00:37
54.4 km road race	H4	Jennette Jansen; Netherlands	1:40:48	Svetlana Moshkovich; Russia	+ 00:34	Sandra Graf; Switzerland	+ 03:07
54.4 km road race	H5	Andrea Eskau; Germany	1:43:44	Laura de Vaan; Netherlands	s.t.	Anna Maria Vitelaru; Italy	+ 19:21
54.4 km road race	C1	Katie Toft; Great Britain	1:21:37	Kaitlyn Schurmann; Australia	+ 10:16		
54.4 km road race	C2	Keiko Noguchi; Japan	1:37:16	Sini Zeng; China	s.t.	Daniela Munévar; Colombia	s.t.
54.4 km road race	C3	Anna Beck; Sweden	1:37:16	Denise Schindler; Germany	s.t.	Jamie Whitmore; United States	s.t.
68.0 km road race	C4	Shawn Morelli; United States	1:55:21	Hannah MacDougall; Australia	+ 00:06	Jianping Ruan; China	+ 01:54
68.0 km road race	C5	Sarah Storey; Great Britain	1:51:13	Paula Ossa; Colombia	s.t.	Crystal Lane-Wright; Great Britain	s.t.
81.6 km road race	Tandem B	Ireland; Katie-George Dunlevy; Eve McCrystal (pilot)	02:00:11	Great Britain; Lora Fachie; Corrine Hall (pilot)	+ 02:24	Poland; Iwona Podkościelna; Aleksandra Tecław (pilot)	+ 02:28
Mixed events
Team Relay	H1-5	United States; William Groulx (H2); David Randall (H3); Oscar Sanchez (H5)	27:55	Italy; Paolo Cecchetto (H3); Luca Mazzone (H2); Alessandro Zanardi (H5)	s.t.	Spain; Israel Rider (H3); Sergio Garrote Muñoz (H2); Luis Miguel Garcia-Marquina Cascallana (H3)	+ 00:59

== Medal table ==
25 nations won medals

Rank	Nation	Gold	Silver	Bronze	Total
1	Italy	9	4	4	17
2	United States	9	4	2	15
3	Netherlands	9	3	1	13
4	Great Britain	5	4	2	11
5	Canada	4	2	1	7
6	Australia	3	6	3	12
7	Germany	3	4	3	10
8	Belgium	2	0	1	3
9	Ireland	2	0	0	2
9	Sweden	2	0	0	2
11	Russia	1	6	3	10
12	China	1	3	2	6
13	Spain	1	2	8	11
14	Japan	1	1	0	2
15	Slovakia	1	0	0	1
16	Poland	0	3	5	8
17	Colombia	0	2	4	6
18	South Africa	0	2	0	2
18	South Korea	0	2	0	2
20	Brazil	0	1	2	3
21	France	0	1	1	2
21	Ukraine	0	1	1	2
23	Switzerland	0	0	3	3
24	Finland	0	0	1	1
Totals (24 entries)		53	51	47	151

== Participating nations ==
45 nations

- Argentina (4)
- Australia (14)
- Austria (9)
- Belgium (13)
- Belarus (3)
- Brazil (8)
- Canada (11)
- China (11)
- Colombia (11)
- Croatia (2)
- Czech Republic (11)
- Denmark (3)
- Spain (20)
- Estonia (2)
- Finland (5)
- France (13)
- Germany (19)
- Great Britain (16)
- Greece (3)
- Hungary (5)
- India (13)
- Ireland (6)
- Iceland (1)
- Italy (22)
- Japan (4)
- South Korea(7)
- Latvia (1)
- Netherlands (16)
- New Zealand (7)
- Malaysia (2)
- Peru (1)
- Poland (18)
- Portugal (3)
- Romania (3)
- South Africa (4)
- Russia (15)
- Slovenia (3)
- Serbia (1)
- Switzerland (11)
- Slovakia (5)
- Sweden (3)
- United Arab Emirates (4)
- Ukraine (1)
- United States (18)
- Venezuela (4)
