= Cycling at the 2024 Summer Paralympics – Men's road time trial H1 =

Men's road time trial H1 at the XVII Paralympic Games
- Venue: Clichy-sous-Bois
- Dates: 4 September
- Competitors: 5 from 5 nations
- Winning time: 34:50.45

Medalists
1st place, gold medalist(s)		Fabrizio Cornegliani	Italy
2nd place, silver medalist(s)		Maxime Hordies	Belgium
3rd place, bronze medalist(s)		Nicolas Pieter du Preez	South Africa

The Men's time trial H1 road cycling event at the 2024 Summer Paralympics took place on 4 September 2024, at Clichy-sous-Bois, Paris. Five riders competed in the event.

The H1 classification is for hand cyclists with the greatest level of impairment.

== Results ==
Results
Rank	Rider	Nationality	Class	Time	Deficit
1st place, gold medalist(s)	Fabrizio Cornegliani	Italy	H1	34:50.45	
2nd place, silver medalist(s)	Maxime Hordies	Belgium	H1	35:11.13	+0:20.68
3rd place, bronze medalist(s)	Nicolas Pieter du Preez	South Africa	H1	36:07.05	+1:16.60
4	Patrik Jahoda	Czech Republic	H1	37:50.51	+3:00.06
5	Benjamin Frueh	Switzerland	H1	38:24.73	+3:34.28
