= Cycling at the 2020 Summer Paralympics – Men's road time trial T1–2 =

Men's road time trial T1–2 at the XVI Paralympic Games
- Venue: Fuji Speedway
- Dates: 31 August 2021
- Competitors: 9 from 9 nations
- Winning time: 25:00.32

Medalists
1st place, gold medalist(s)		Chen Jianxin	China
2nd place, silver medalist(s)		Giorgio Farroni	Italy
3rd place, bronze medalist(s)		Tim Celen	Belgium

The men's time trial class T1-2 road cycling event at the 2020 Summer Paralympics took place on 31 August 2021 at the Fuji Speedway, Japan. 9 riders all from different nations competed in this event.

The T1–2 classification is for cyclists who have an impairment which affects their balance. They compete with a three-wheeled cycle called a tricycle - three wheels providing more balance than a standard two-wheeled cycle.

== Results ==
The event took place on 31 August 2021, at 15:23:

Rank	Rider	Nationality	Class	Real Time	Finish Time	Deficit
1st place, gold medalist(s)	Chen Jianxin	China	T1	28:54.88	25:00.32	
2nd place, silver medalist(s)	Giorgio Farroni	Italy	T1	32:10.83	27:49.78	+2:49.46
3rd place, bronze medalist(s)	Tim Celen	Belgium	T2	30:44.21	30:44.21	+5:43.89
4	Joan Reinosa Figuerola	Spain	T2	31:07.27	31:07.27	+6:06.95
5	Stuart Jones	Australia	T2	31:12.94	31:12.94	+6:12.62
6	Juan José Betancourt Quiroga	Colombia	T2	31:15.64	31:15.64	+6:15.32
7	Sergei Semochkin	RPC	T1	36:30.61	31:34.44	+6:34.12
8	Stephen Hills	New Zealand	T2	32:26.36	32:26.36	+7:26.04
9	Matthew Rodriguez	United States	T2	32:29.47	32:29.47	+7:29.15

Factors

T1 – 86.480
T2 – 100.00
