= Cycling at the 2016 Summer Paralympics – Women's road time trial H1–3 =

Cycling, Women's road time trial H1-3 at the XV Paralympic Games
- Venue: Flamengo Park
- Dates: 14 September
- Competitors: 11 from 8 nations

Medalists
1st place, gold medalist(s)		Karen Darke	Great Britain
2nd place, silver medalist(s)		Alicia Dana	United States
3rd place, bronze medalist(s)		Francesca Porcellato	Italy

The Women's time trial H1-3 road cycling event at the 2016 Summer Paralympics took place on 14 September at Flamengo Park, Pontal. Eight riders from seven nations competed.

The H1 category is for cyclists using handcycles because of lower limb dysfunction or amputation.

== Results : Women's road time trial H1-3 ==
Rank	Name	Nationality	Time	Factor	Final Time
1st place, gold medalist(s)	Karen Darke	Great Britain	33:44.93	100	33:44.93
2nd place, silver medalist(s)	Alicia Dana	United States	33:57.48	100	33:57.48
3rd place, bronze medalist(s)	Francesca Porcellato	Italy	34:20.48	100	34:20.48
4	Renata Kaluza	Poland	34:33.96	100	34:33.96
5	Justine Asher	South Africa	40:46.18	84.79	34:34.12
6	Jady Martins Malavazzi	Brazil	35:33.29	100	35:33.29
7	Huaxian Li	China	36:09.52	100	36:09.52
8	Anna Oroszova	Slovakia	37:00.91	100	37:00.91
9	Katerina Antosova	Czech Republic	38:34.20	100	38:34.20
10	Mikyoung Jeon	South Korea	46:09.73	84.79	39:08.45
11	Ciara Staunton	Ireland	53:38.17	84.79	45:28.69
