= Cycling at the 2024 Summer Paralympics – Men's road time trial T1–2 =

Men's road time trial T1-2 at the XVII Paralympic Games
- Venue: Clichy-sous-Bois
- Dates: 4 September
- Competitors: 12 from 12 nations
- Winning time: 21:35.78

Medalists
1st place, gold medalist(s)		Chen Jianxin	China
2nd place, silver medalist(s)		Nathan Clement	Canada
3rd place, bronze medalist(s)		Tim Celen	Belgium

The Men's time trial T1-2 road cycling event at the 2024 Summer Paralympics took place on 4 September 2024, at Clichy-sous-Bois, Paris. Twelve riders competed in the event.

The T1-2 classification is for tricycle cyclists with balance problems. This will be a factored event.

== Results ==
Rank	Rider	Nationality	Class	r.t.	Factor	Result	n.d.	Notes
1st place, gold medalist(s)	Chen Jianxin	China	T1	24:41.91	87.440	21:35.78		
2nd place, silver medalist(s)	Nathan Clement	Canada	T1	26:10.63	87.440	22:53.36	+01:17.58	
3rd place, bronze medalist(s)	Tim Celen	Belgium	T2	23:27.64	100.00	23:27.64	+01:51.86	
4	Giorgio Farroni	Italy	T1	27:30.86	87.440	24:03.51	+02:27.73	
5	Dennis Connors	United States	T2	24:37.11	100.00	24:37.11	+03:01.33	
6	Wolfgang Steinbichler	Austria	T2	24:59.86	100.00	24:59.86	+03:24.08	
7	Juan José Betancourt Quiroga	Colombia	T2	25:06.46	100.00	25:06.46	+03:30.68	
8	Maximilian Jäger	Germany	T2	25:15.36	100.00	25:15.36	+03:39.58	
9	Jindrich Masin	Czech Republic	T2	25:32.12	100.00	25:32.12	+03:56.34	
10	Kim Yong-ki	South Korea	T1	29:41.83	87.440	25:58.03	+04:22:25	
11	Theodor Matican	Romania	T2	30:01.79	100.00	30:01.79	+08:26.01	
12	Martin Heggelund	Denmark	T2	33:25.24	100.00	33:25.24	+11:49.46	
