= Christophe Hindricq =

Belgian wheelchair athlete

Personal information
- Nationality: Belgian
- Born: 18 February 1965 (age 61)

Sport
- Sport: Wheelchair Rugby; Para-cycling
- Club: Rolling Lions - Namur
Medal record
Representing Belgium
Men's para-cycling
Paralympic Games
Bronze medal – third place	2016 Rio de Janeiro	Mixed Team Relay (H2-5)

Christophe Hindricq (born 18 February 1965) is a former Paralympian sportsman from Belgium. He competed in wheelchair rugby and para-cycling. His twenty-two yearlong sporting career spanned from May 2000 to May 2022.

== Personal history ==
Hindricq was born in Belgium in 1965. He was a restaurant worker and manager of a sports gym when In 1988 he suffered a spinal cord injury in a motorcycle accident. Ten years later he began para-sporting. He is a co-founder of para-cycling club Rolling Lions in Namur, Belgium.

== Sporting career ==
Hindricq participated in 3 Paralympics. He was a member of Belgium's wheelchair rugby team that competed at the 2004 Summer Paralympics in Athens. After switching to para-cycling, he competed in the H1 men's road race and time trial at the 2012 Summer Paralympics in London and in the H2 men's road race and time trial at the 2016 Summer Paralympics in Rio de Janeiro. He won a bronze medal in Rio de Janeiro as a member of Belgium's team in the mixed team relay.

He participated in 6 world championships and was crowned European champion in 2005 in Alkmaar, the Netherlands.

== Honours ==
- chevalier du Mérite wallon (November 2016)

== Awards ==
- Trophy Victor Boin (2017)
