= Katie Toft =

British cyclist (born 1993)

Personal information
- Born: 28 January 1993 (age 33) Derbyshire, England

Cycling career
- Sport: Cycling
- Disciplines: Road, track
- Role: Rider
Medal record
Representing United Kingdom
Women's para-cycling
Track World Championships
Gold medal – first place	2018 Rio de Janeiro	Individual pursuit C1
Gold medal – first place	2019 Apeldoorn	Individual pursuit C1
Gold medal – first place	2019 Apeldoorn	Scratch race C1–C2
Gold medal – first place	2022 Saint-Quentin-en-Yvelines	Time trial C1
Gold medal – first place	2022 Saint-Quentin-en-Yvelines	Individual pursuit C1
Gold medal – first place	2022 Saint-Quentin-en-Yvelines	Scratch race C1
Gold medal – first place	2022 Saint-Quentin-en-Yvelines	Ominum C1
Silver medal – second place	2019 Apeldoorn	Time trial C1
Silver medal – second place	2024 Rio de Janeiro	Time trial C1
Silver medal – second place	2024 Rio de Janeiro	Individual pursuit C1
Silver medal – second place	2024 Rio de Janeiro	Scratch race C1
Silver medal – second place	2024 Rio de Janeiro	Ominum C1
Road World Championships
Gold medal – first place	2018 Maniago	Time trial C1
Gold medal – first place	2018 Maniago	Road race C1
Silver medal – second place	2019 Emmen	Time trial C2
Silver medal – second place	2019 Emmen	Road race C1
Silver medal – second place	2024 Zurich	Time trial C1
Bronze medal – third place	2023 Glasgow	Time trial C1

Katie Toft (born 28 January 1993) is a British cyclist who competes in road and track events. Born with cerebral palsy, she is listed in the C1 classification.

== Career ==
Toft competed in the 2018 Track World Championships, losing to Li Jieli in the time trial but defeated her in the individual pursuit. Then at the 2018 Road World Championships, she won the time trial and road race C1 events, finishing ahead of Kaitlyn Schurmann in both of them.

At the 2019 Track World Championships, in Apeldoorn, Toft won gold medals in the individual pursuit C1 and scratch race C1 as well as the silver medal in the time trial. Later in the year, at the Road World Championships in Netherlands, she won silver medals in the Women's Time Trial C2 and Women's Road Race C1, finishing behind Qian Wangwei and ahead of Schurmann.

Toft competed in the 2022 Track World Championships, in the time trial, individual pursuit, scratch race and omnium C1 events. She and finished first in all of them, all in which only the gold medal was awarded. At the 2023 Road World Championships, she won the bronze medal in the time trial event. Toft competed in the 2024 Track World Championships, winning the silver medal in the time trial, individual pursuit, scratch race and omnium; she finished behind Qian Wangwei in all of them. Later in the year, she competed in the 2024 Road World Championships, winning the silver medal in the time trial.
