= Emilie Miller =

Australian Paralympic handcyclist (born 1995)

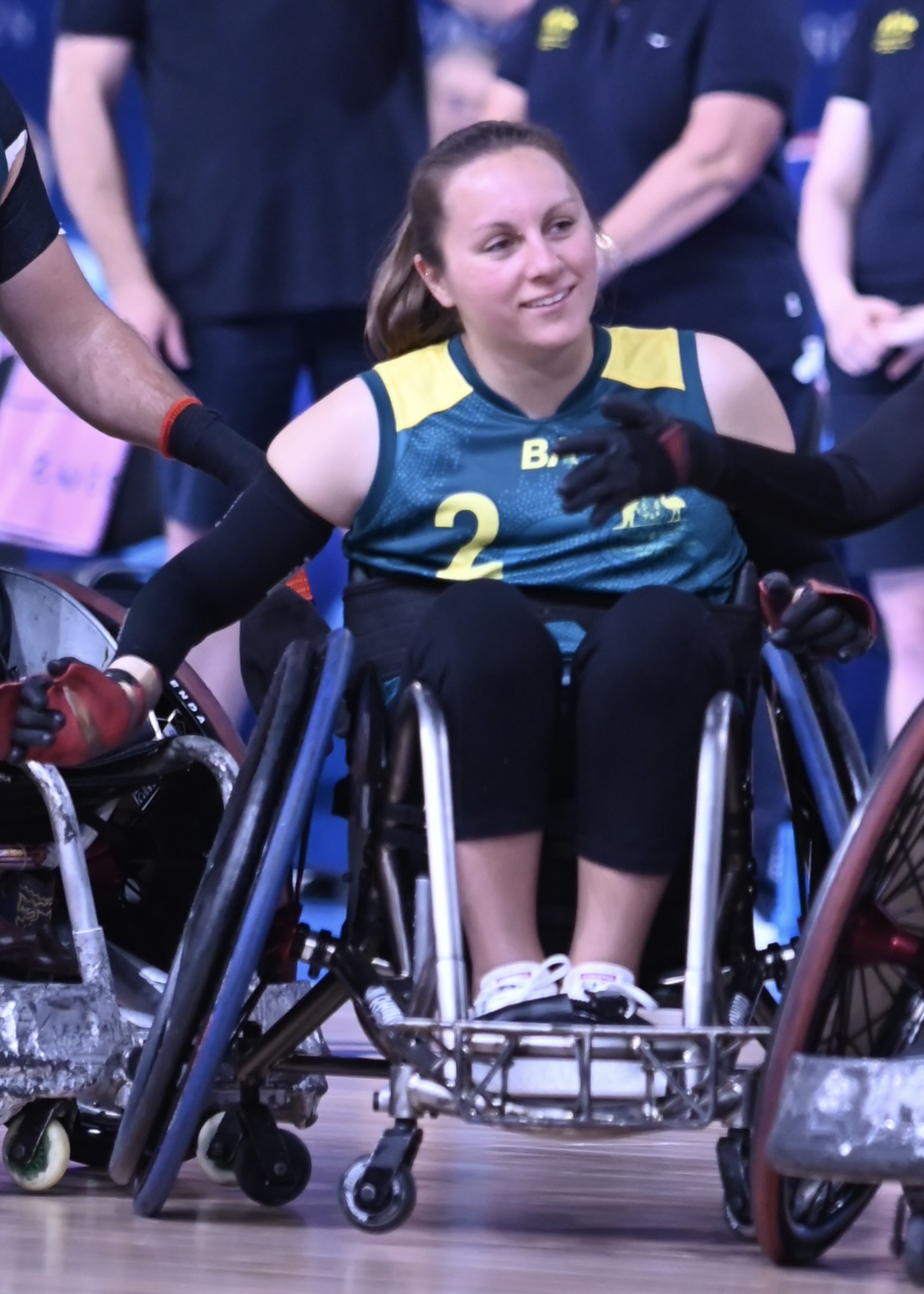

Personal information
- Full name: Emilie Miller
- Nationality: Australia
- Born: 9 March 1995 (age 31)

Sport
- Rank: H1 (Cycling); 0.5 Wheelchair rugby
- Club: Bathurst Cycling Club; Bond University Rugby
- Coached by: Toireasa Gallagher
Medal record
Wheelchair rugby
Paralympic Games
Bronze medal – third place	2024 Paris	Mixed
World Championships
Gold medal – first place	2022 Vejle	Mixed
Silver medal – second place	2018 Sydney	Mixed
Silver medal – second place	2026 São Paulo	Mixed
Women's cycling
Representing Australia
UCI Para-cycling Road World Championships
Gold medal – first place	2018 Maniago	Women's Time Trial H1
Gold medal – first place	2018 Maniago	Women's Road Race H1
Gold medal – first place	2019 Emmen	Women's Time Trial H1
Gold medal – first place	2019 Emmen	Women's Road Race H1

Emilie Miller (born 9 March 1995) is an Australian Paralympic road hand cyclist and wheelchair rugby player. She won a bronze medal with the Steelers at the 2024 Paris Paralympics.

== Personal ==
Miller was born on 9 March 1995. As a 12 year old at Kinross Wolaroi School, Orange, New South Wales, she was training at Lithgow War Memorial Swimming Pool for the NSW State Age Championships when she slipped during a dive in the shallow end of the pool and the accident left her a quadriplegic. She lost a High Court of Australia appeal for compensation for her life-altering injuries that occurred as a result of the accident. In 2024, she lives in Bathurst, New South Wales.

== Cycling ==
Miller was ranked in the top 20 Australian girl swimmers for her age when a diving accident during training in 2008 left her a quadriplegic. She took up hand cycling at the age of 17 as cross training for another sport. Her first Australian Road Cycling Championships were in 2013 and as of 2019 is undefeated in H1 events.

At the 2018 UCI Para-cycling Road World Championships in Italy, she won gold medals in Women's Time Trial H1 and Women's Road race H1. She repeated these medals at the 2019 UCI Para-cycling Road World Championships in Netherlands.

She was coached in Bathurst by former world junior cyclist Toireasa Gallagher (née Ryan).

== Wheelchair rugby ==
Miller classified as 0.5 player, won her first world championship gold medal at the 2022 IWRF World Championship in Vejle, Denmark, when Australia defeated the United States .

At the 2024 Summer Paralympics, he was a member of the Steelers that won the bronze medal defeating Great Britain 50–48.
