= Chen Jianxin =

Chen Jianxin may refer to:

- Chen Jianxin (athlete), Chinese Asian Games athlete
- Chen Jianxin (curler), Chinese wheelchair curling parathlete
- Chen Jianxin (cyclist), Chinese cyclist parathlete
