= Cycling at the 2024 Summer Paralympics – Men's road time trial H2 =

Men's road time trial H2 at the XVII Paralympic Games
- Venue: Clichy-sous-Bois
- Dates: 4 September
- Competitors: 6 from 6 nations
- Winning time: 24:33.71

Medalists
1st place, gold medalist(s)		Sergio Garrote Munoz	Spain
2nd place, silver medalist(s)		Luca Mazzone	Italy
3rd place, bronze medalist(s)		Florian Jouanny	France

The Men's time trial H2 road cycling event at the 2024 Summer Paralympics took place on 4 September 2024, at Clichy-sous-Bois, Paris. Six riders competed in the event.

The H2 classification is for hand-cyclists.

== Results ==
Rank	Rider	Nationality	Class	Time	Deficit
1st place, gold medalist(s)	Sergio Garrote Munoz	Spain	H2	24:33.71	
2nd place, silver medalist(s)	Luca Mazzone	Italy	H2	25:18.83	+0:45.12
3rd place, bronze medalist(s)	Florian Jouanny	France	H2	25:19.29	+0:45.58
4	Amit Hasdai	Israel	H2	29:06.63	+4:32.92
5	Rory Mead	New Zealand	H2	29:22.41	+4:48.70
6	Cody Wills	United States	H2	30:01.21	+5:27.50
