= Cycling at the 2024 Summer Paralympics – Men's road race T1–2 =

Men's road race T1-2 at the XVII Paralympic Games
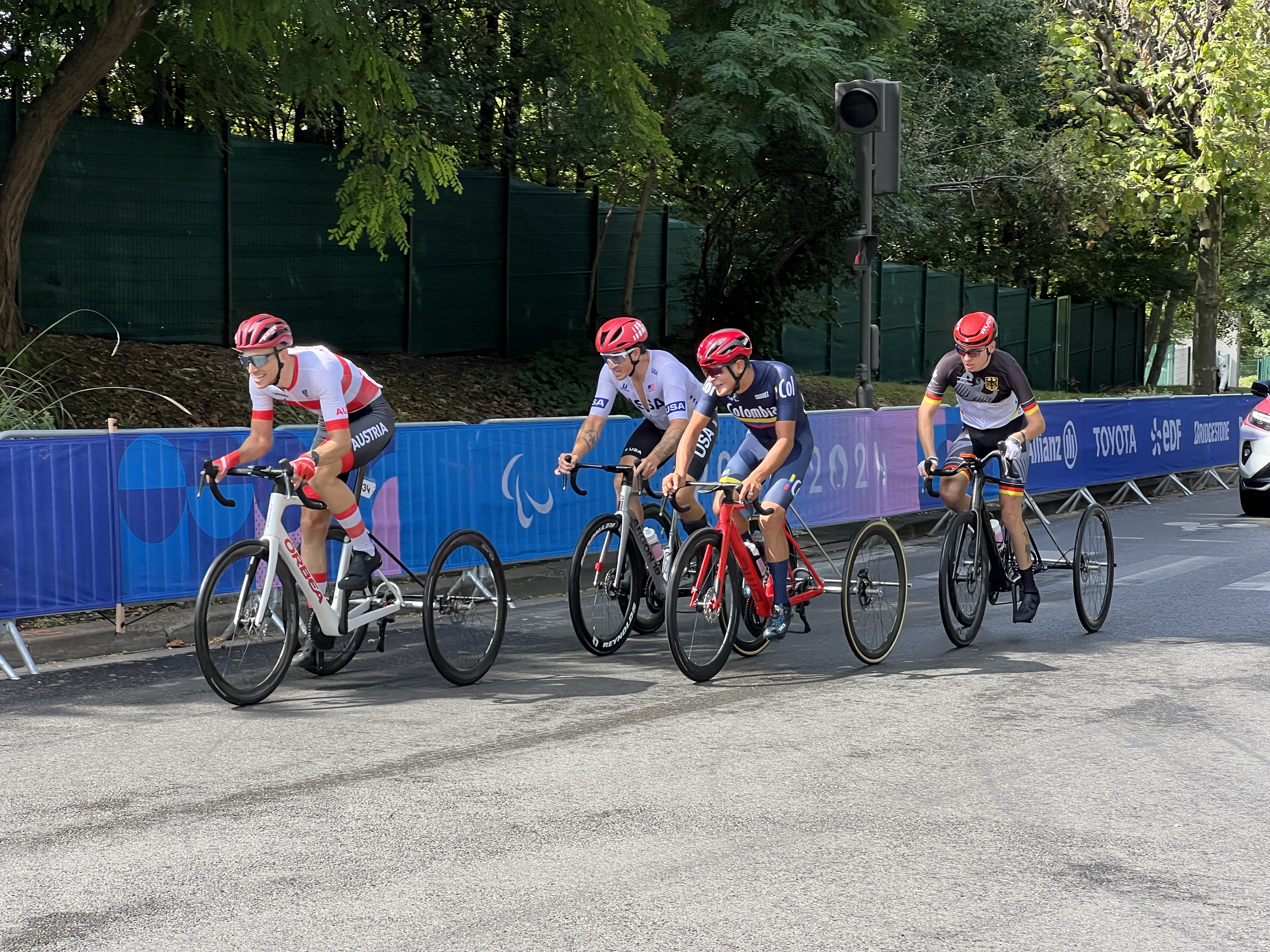
- Venue: Clichy-sous-Bois
- Dates: 7 September 2024
- Competitors: 12 from 12 nations
- Winning time: 1:15:08

Medalists
1st place, gold medalist(s)		Chen Jianxin	China
2nd place, silver medalist(s)		Dennis Connors	United States
3rd place, bronze medalist(s)		Juan José Betancourt Quiroga	Colombia

The men's road race T1-2 cycling event at the 2024 Summer Paralympics took place on 7 September 2024 in Clichy-sous-Bois in Seine-Saint-Denis, Paris, France. 12 riders competed in the event. The T classes are for riders with balance problems, riding racing tricycles.

== Schedule ==
F	Finals

Men's Road Race
Event↓/Date →	5 September	6 September	7 September
B		F	
H1-2	F		
H3	F		
H4	F		
H5	F		
C1-3			F
C4-5		F	
T1-2			F

== Results ==
The event took place on 7 September 2024 at 12:45.

Rank	Rider	Nationality	Class	Time	Gap	Notes
1st place, gold medalist(s)	Chen Jianxin	China	T1	1:15:08		
2nd place, silver medalist(s)	Dennis Connors	United States	T2	1:17:09	+02:01	
3rd place, bronze medalist(s)	Juan José Betancourt Quiroga	Colombia	T2	1:17:09	+02:01	
4	Maximilian Jäger	Germany	T2	1:17:09	+02:01	
5	Wolfgang Steinbichler	Austria	T2	1:17:15	+02:07	
6	Tim Celen	Belgium	T2	1:21:25	+06:17	
7	Jindrich Masin	Czech Republic	T2	1:24:42	+09:34	
8	Giorgio Farroni	Italy	T1	1:29:49	+14:41	
9	Nathan Clement	Canada	T1	1:31:20	+16:12	
10	Theodor Matican	Romania	T2	1:37:11	+22:03	
11	Kim Yongki	South Korea	T1	1:41:38	+26:30	
12	Martin Heggelund	Denmark	T2	1:41:42	+26:34	
