= Cycling at the 2020 Summer Paralympics – Men's road time trial H2 =

Men's road time trial H2 at the XVI Paralympic Games
- Venue: Fuji Speedway
- Dates: 31 August
- Competitors: 7 from 7 nations
- Winning time: 31:23.53

Medalists
1st place, gold medalist(s)		Sergio Garrote Muñoz	Spain
2nd place, silver medalist(s)		Luca Mazzone	Italy
3rd place, bronze medalist(s)		Florian Jouanny	France

The men's time trial H2 road cycling event at the 2020 Summer Paralympics took place on 31 August 2021, at the Fuji Speedway in Tokyo. 7 riders competed in the event.

The H2 classification is for tetraplegics with minor upper limb impairment from C7 thru T3. These riders operate a hand-operated cycle.

== Results ==
The event took place on 31 August 2021, at 10:15:

Rank	Rider	Nationality	Time	Deficit
1st place, gold medalist(s)	Sergio Garrote Muñoz	Spain	31:23.53	
2nd place, silver medalist(s)	Luca Mazzone	Italy	31:23.79	+0.26
3rd place, bronze medalist(s)	Florian Jouanny	France	32:41.62	+1:18.09
4	Will Groulx	United States	36:17.25	+4:53.72
5	Rory Mead	New Zealand	36:53.78	+5:30.25
6	Phongchai Yanaruedee	Thailand	1:30:40.98	+59:17.45
	Tobias Fankhauser	Switzerland	DNF	
