= Cycling at the 2016 Summer Paralympics – Mixed team relay =

Cycling, Mixed team relay at the XV Paralympic Games
- Venue: Flamengo Park
- Dates: 14 September
- Competitors: 15 (5 teams of three) from 5 nations

Medalists
1st place, gold medalist(s)		Vittorio Podesta; Luca Mazzone; Alessandro Zanardi	Italy
2nd place, silver medalist(s)		William Lachenauer; William Groulx; Oscar Sanchez	United States
3rd place, bronze medalist(s)		Jean-Francois Deberg; Christophe Hindricq; Jonas Van De Steene	Belgium

The Mixed team relay road cycling event at the 2016 Summer Paralympics took place on the afternoon of 14 September at Flamengo Park, Pontal. 5 teams of three, all using handcycles, took part.

The H category is for cyclists with lower limb deficiencies.

== Results : Mixed Relay ==
14 September 2016, Rio.

Rank	Team	Riders	Time
1st place, gold medalist(s)	Italy	Vittorio Podesta; Luca Mazzone; Alessandro Zanardi	32:34:00
2nd place, silver medalist(s)	United States	William Lachenauer; William Groulx; Oscar Sanchez	33:21:00
3rd place, bronze medalist(s)	Belgium	Jean-Francois Deberg; Christophe Hindricq; Jonas Van De Steene	34:02:00
4	Switzerland	Lukas Weber; Tobias Fankhauser; Heinz Frei	34:19:00
5	Austria	Walter Ablinger; Wolfgang Schattauer; Thomas Fruhwirth	35:38:00
