= Cycling at the 2020 Summer Paralympics – Men's road race T1–2 =

Men's road race T1–2 at the XVI Paralympic Games
- Venue: Fuji Speedway
- Dates: 2 September 2021
- Competitors: 9 from 9 nations
- Winning time: 51:07

Medalists
1st place, gold medalist(s)		Chen Jianxin	China
2nd place, silver medalist(s)		Tim Celen	Belgium
3rd place, bronze medalist(s)		Juan José Betancourt Quiroga	Colombia

The men's road race T1-2 cycling event at the 2020 Summer Paralympics took place on 2 September 2021, at the Fuji Speedway in Shizuoka Prefecture. 9 riders competed in the event.

The T1–2 classification is for cyclists who have an impairment which affects their balance. They compete with a three-wheeled cycle called a tricycle - three wheels providing more balance than a standard two-wheeled cycle.

== Results ==
The event took place on 2 September 2021 at 13:00:

Rank	Rider	Nationality	Class	Time	Deficit
1st place, gold medalist(s)	Chen Jianxin	China	T1	51:07	
2nd place, silver medalist(s)	Tim Celen	Belgium	T2	52:15	+1:08
3rd place, bronze medalist(s)	Juan José Betancourt Quiroga	Colombia	T2	52:41	+1:34
4	Joan Reinosa Figuerola	Spain	T2	53:05	+1:58
5	Matthew Rodriguez	United States	T2	53:10	+2:03
6	Stephen Hills	New Zealand	T1	54:13	+3:06
7	Giorgio Farroni	Italy	T1	55:48	+4:41
8	Stuart Jones	Australia	T2	59:17	+8:10
9	Sergei Semochkin	RPC	T1	1:02:17	11:10
