= 2022 UCI Para-cycling Road World Championships =

- Location: Baie-Comeau, Canada
- Dates: 11–14 August 2022
- Competitors: 243 from 37 nations

The 2022 UCI Para-cycling Road World Championships was the 11th edition of the World Championships for road cycling for athletes with a physical disability. The championships took place in Baie-Comeau in Canada from 11 to 14 August 2022.

== Medalists ==
=== Men's events ===
Event	Class	Gold		Silver		Bronze	
Time trial
18.9 km time trial	C1	Michael Teuber (GER)	28:44.90	Aaron Keith (USA)	+4.76	Ricardo Ten Argilés (ESP)	+18.11
18.9 km time trial	C2	Ewoud Vromant (BEL)	26:37.97	Alexandre Léauté (FRA)	+14.65	Darren Hicks (AUS)	+26.91
18.9 km time trial	C3	Eduardo Santas (ESP)	26:25.71	Finlay Graham (GBR)	+0.08	Florian Bouziani (FRA)	+9.64
18.9 km time trial	H1	Fabrizio Cornegliani (ITA)	47:41.46	Pieter du Preez (RSA)	+1:13.36	Maxime Hordies (BEL)	+2:35.57
18.9 km time trial	H2	Sergio Garrote Muñoz (ESP)	33:31.07	Florian Jouanny (FRA)	+16.33	Luca Mazzone (ITA)	+29.54
18.9 km time trial	H3	Paolo Cecchetto (ITA)	31:42.13	Charles Moreau (CAN)	+13.80	Mirko Testa (ITA)	+31.80
18.9 km time trial	H4	Jetze Plat (NED)	28:10.53	Thomas Frühwirth (AUT)	+38.79	Rafał Wilk (POL)	+1:27.33
18.9 km time trial	H5	Mitch Valize (NED)	28:18.76	Loïc Vergnaud (FRA)	+56.04	Luis Costa (POR)	+2:14.25
18.9 km time trial	T1	Giorgio Farroni (ITA)	37:31.02	Nathan Clement (CAN)	+1:19.47	Gonzalo García Abella (ESP)	+1:59.02
18.9 km time trial	T2	Tim Celen (BEL)	33:39.26	Maximilian Jäger (GER)	+45.77	Stuart Jones (AUS)	+1:35.70
28.4 km time trial	B	Tristan Bangma (NED); Pilot: Patrick Bos	34:53.21	Vincent ter Schure (NED); Pilot: Timo Fransen	+30.31	Alexandre Lloveras (FRA); Pilot: Maxime Gressier	+1:17.22
28.4 km time trial	C4	George Peasgood (GBR)	38:26.73	Louis Clincke (BEL)	+1:04.54	Ronan Grimes (IRL)	+1:30.91
28.4 km time trial	C5	Daniel Abraham (NED)	36:37.88	Dorian Foulon (FRA)	+12.40	Kévin Le Cunff (FRA)	+16.11
Road race
28.4 km road race	H1	Maxime Hordies (BEL)	1:16.26	Fabrizio Cornegliani (ITA)	+0:05	Pieter du Preez (RSA)	+1:16
28.4 km road race	T1	Giorgio Farroni (ITA)	1:00:20	Nathan Clement (CAN)	+1:22	Gonzalo García Abella (ESP)	+2:36
37.8 km road race	T2	Tim Celen (BEL)	1:13:32	Dennis Connors (USA)	+0:01	Maximilian Jäger (GER)	+0:01
47.3 km road race	H2	Florian Jouanny (FRA)	1:28:46	Luca Mazzone (ITA)	+0:00	Sergio Garrote Muñoz (ESP)	+0:00
66.2 km road race	H3	Riadh Tarsim (FRA)	1:59:59	Paolo Cecchetto (ITA)	+0:01	Joey Desjardins (CAN)	+0:03
66.2 km road race	H4	Jetze Plat (NED)	1:46.29	Thomas Frühwirth (AUT)	+1:08	Mathieu Bosredon (FRA)	+2:25
66.2 km road race	H5	Mitch Valize (NED)	1:49:30	Loic Vergnaud (FRA)	+3:03	Tim de Vries (NED)	+5:41
70.2 km road race	C1	Ricardo Ten Argilés (ESP)	1:50:07	Aaron Keith (GBR)	+4:38	Carlos Alberto Gomes Soares (BRA)	+6:36
70.2 km road race	C2	Alexandre Leaute (FRA)	1:49:49	Florian Chapeau (FRA)	+0:09	Ewoud Vromant (BEL)	+0:11
70.2 km road race	C3	Finlay Graham (GBR)	1:49:31	Steffen Warias (GER)	+0:14	Eduardo Santas (ESP)	+0:24
81.9 km road race	C4	Ronan Grimes (IRL)	2:04:31	Louis Clincke (BEL)	+0:00	George Peasgood (GBR)	+0:00
81.9 km road race	C5	Kévin Le Cunff (FRA)	2:00:00	Lauro César Mouro Chaman (BRA)	+0:00	Alistair Donohoe (AUS)	+0:00
105.3 km road race	B	Tristan Bangma (NED); Pilot: Patrick Bos	02:25:06	Alexandre Lloveras (FRA); Pilot: Maxime Gressier	+01:48	Piotr Kolodziejczuk (POL); Pilot: Michal Podlaski	+03:04

=== Women's events ===
Event	Class	Gold		Silver		Bronze	
Time trial
9.4 km time trial	H1	Simona Canipari (ITA)	43:31.44	Not awarded			
9.4 km time trial	H2	Katerina Brim (USA)	20:46.00	Roberta Amadeo (ITA)	+3:54.22	Not awarded	
18.9 km time trial	C1	Frances Brown (GBR)	31:20.15	Kaitlyn Schurmann (AUS)	+7:14.31	Not awarded	
18.9 km time trial	C2	Maike Hausberger (GER)	31:04.10	Flurina Rigling (SUI)	+38.41	Daniela Munévar (COL)	+2:16.77
18.9 km time trial	C3	Clara Brown (USA)	29:36.72	Keiko Sugiura (JPN)	+51.78	Paige Greco (AUS)	+1:06.09
18.9 km time trial	C4	Samantha Bosco (USA)	28:28.83	Emily Petricola (AUS)	+1:15.40	Keely Shaw (CAN)	+1:49.26
18.9 km time trial	C5	Kerstin Brachtendorf (GER)	28:12.99	Nicole Murray (NZL)	+37.43	Eleonora Mele (ITA)	+1:49.28
18.9 km time trial	H3	Annika Zeyen (GER)	36:00.88	Francesca Porcellato (ITA)	+15.90	Jady Martins Malavazzi (BRA)	+2:05.35
18.9 km time trial	H4	Jennette Jansen (NED)	36:06.95	Suzanna Tangen (NOR)	+1:19.55	Sandra Stöckli (SUI)	+1:40.75
18.9 km time trial	H5	Oksana Masters (USA)	33:35.05	Ana Maria Vitelaru (ITA)	+2:12.47	Katia Aere (ITA)	+4:25.79
18.9 km time trial	T1	Marieke van Soest (NED)	42:49.93	Dulce González Guerrero (MEX)	+3:42.32	Shelley Gautier (CAN)	+7:09.97
18.9 km time trial	T2	Angelika Dreock-Käser (GER)	39:26.92	Carol Cooke (AUS)	+1:00.01	Jana Majunke (GER)	+1:42.91
28.4 km time trial	B	Sophie Unwin (GBR); Pilot: Jenny Holl	39:57.21	Katie-George Dunlevy (IRL); Pilot: Eve McCrystal	+49.53	Louise Jannering (SWE); Pilot: Catrin Nilsson	+3:21.15
Road race
18.9 km road race	H1	Simona Canipari (ITA)	1:29:27	Not awarded		Not awarded	
28.4 km road race	H2	Katerina Brim (USA)	1:08:34	Roberta Amadeo (ITA)	+11:09	Not awarded	
28.4 km road race	T1	Marieke van Soest (NED)	1:05:56	Dulce González Guerrero (MEX)	+8:47	Eltje Malzbender (NZL)	+12:23
37.8 km road race	T2	Jana Majunke (GER)	1:25:10	Angelika Dreock-Käser (GER)	+0:17	Emma Lund (DEN)	+2:56
56.7 km road race	H3	Annika Zeyen (GER)	1:56:47	Francesca Porcellato (ITA)	+2:46	Jady Martins Malavazzi (BRA)	+4:58
56.7 km road race	H4	Jennette Jansen (NED)	1:56:14	Suzanna Tangen (NOR)	+5:31	Sandra Stöckli (SUI)	+7:34
56.7 km road race	H5	Oksana Masters (USA)	2:00:35	Ana Maria Vitelaru (ITA)	+0:00	Chantal Haenen (NED)	+0:00
58.5 km road race	C1	Frances Brown (GBR)	1:46:17	Kaitlyn Schurmann (AUS)	-1 LAP	Not awarded	
58.5 km road race	C2	Maike Hausberger (GER)	1:45:31	Daniela Munévar (COL)	+0:04	Flurina Rigling (GER)	+0:04
58.5 km road race	C3	Keiko Sugiura (JPN)	1:45:28	Clara Brown (USA)	+0:02	Jamie Whitmore (USA)	+0:08
70.2 km road race	C4	Samantha Bosco (USA)	2:00:05	Meg Lemon (AUS)	+3:22	Keely Shaw (CAN)	+3:24
70.2 km road race	C5	Marie Patouillet (FRA)	1:58:42	Kerstin Brachtendorf (GER)	+0:00	Nicole Murray (NZL)	+0:02
81.9 km road race	B	Katie-George Dunlevy (IRL); Pilot: Eve McCrystal	02:09:13	Sophie Unwin (GBR); Pilot: Jenny Holl	+01:36	Josephine Healion (IRL); Pilot: Linda Kelly	+06:16

=== Mixed events ===
Event	Class	Gold		Silver		Bronze	
27.0 km team relay	H1–5	France; Riadh Tarsim; Florian Jouanny; Loïc Vergnaud	47:39	Italy; Paolo Cecchetto; Luca Mazzone; Diego Colombari	48:33	Spain; Martin Berchesi Manzione; Sergio Garrote Muñoz; Luis García-Marquina	49:32

== Medal table ==
* Host nation (Canada)

Rank	Nation	Gold	Silver	Bronze	Total
1	Netherlands (NED)	11	1	2	14
2	Germany (GER)	8	4	2	14
3	United States (USA)	7	4	1	12
4	Italy (ITA)	6	10	4	20
5	France (FRA)	6	7	4	17
6	Great Britain (GBR)	5	2	1	8
7	Belgium (BEL)	4	2	2	8
8	Spain (ESP)	3	0	6	9
9	Ireland (IRL)	2	1	2	5
10	Japan (JPN)	1	1	0	2
11	Australia (AUS)	0	5	4	9
12	Canada (CAN)*	0	3	4	7
13	Austria (AUT)	0	2	0	2
13	Mexico (MEX)	0	2	0	2
13	Norway (NOR)	0	2	0	2
16	Brazil (BRA)	0	1	3	4
16	Switzerland (SUI)	0	1	3	4
18	New Zealand (NZL)	0	1	2	3
19	Colombia (COL)	0	1	1	2
19	South Africa (RSA)	0	1	1	2
21	Poland (POL)	0	0	2	2
22	Denmark (DEN)	0	0	1	1
22	Portugal (POR)	0	0	1	1
22	Sweden (SWE)	0	0	1	1
Totals (24 entries)		53	51	47	151

== Participating nations ==
243 cyclists from 37 nations.

- Argentina (5)
- Australia (13)
- Austria (6)
- Belgium (7)
- Brazil (13)
- Canada (13)
- Colombia (8)
- Czech Republic (4)
- Denmark (2)
- Estonia (2)
- Finland (1)
- France (19)
- Germany (14)
- Great Britain (11)
- Greece (1)
- Hungary (1)
- Ireland (6)
- Israel (1)
- Italy (20)
- Japan (4)
- Latvia (1)
- Mexico (5)
- Netherlands (13)
- New Zealand (5)
- Norway (2)
- Panama (3)
- Poland (7)
- Portugal (4)
- Romania (1)
- Slovenia (1)
- South Africa (1)
- Spain (14)
- Sweden (2)
- Switzerland (12)
- Ukraine (1)
- United Arab Emirates (4)
- United States (16)
