= Cycling at the 2020 Summer Paralympics – Men's road time trial H1 =

Men's road time trial H1 at the XVI Paralympic Games
- Venue: Fuji Speedway
- Dates: 31 August
- Competitors: 7 from 6 nations
- Winning time: 43:49.41

Medalists
| 1st place, gold medalist(s) | | Pieter du Preez | South Africa |
| 2nd place, silver medalist(s) | | Fabrizio Cornegliani | Italy |
| 3rd place, bronze medalist(s) | | Maxime Hordies | Belgium |

The men's time trial H1 road cycling event at the 2020 Summer Paralympics took place on 31 August 2021, at Fuji Speedway, Tokyo. 7 riders competed in the event.

The H1 classification is for tetraplegics with severe upper limb impairment to the C6 vertebra. These riders operate a hand-operated cycle.

== Results ==
The event took place on 31 August 2021, at 10:25:

| Rank | Rider | Nationality | Time | Deficit |
|---|---|---|---|---|
| 1st place, gold medalist(s) | Pieter du Preez | South Africa | 43:49.41 | |
| 2nd place, silver medalist(s) | Fabrizio Cornegliani | Italy | 45:44.56 | +1:55.15 |
| 3rd place, bronze medalist(s) | Maxime Hordies | Belgium | 47:01.23 | +3:11.82 |
| 4 | Patrik Jahoda | Czech Republic | 52:56.13 | +9:06.72 |
| 5 | Teppo Polvi | Finland | 56:29.24 | +12:39.83 |
| | Harri Sopanen | Finland | DNF | |
| | Ernst Bachmaier | Austria | DNF | |
