= Pieter du Preez =

South African paratriathlete

Personal information
- Nickname: Supa Piet
- Born: Nicolas Pieter du Preez; 1979 or 1980 (age 45–46) Randburg, South Africa

Sport
- Country: South Africa
- Sport: Paratriathlon
- Disability class: T51, H1
Medal record
Men's Para-cycling
Representing South Africa
Paralympic Games
Gold medal – first place	2020 Tokyo	Road time trial H1
Bronze medal – third place	2024 Paris	Road time trial H1
Road World Championships
Gold medal – first place	2014 Greenville	Road race H1
Gold medal – first place	2015 Nottwil	Road race H1
Gold medal – first place	2015 Nottwil	Time trial H1
Gold medal – first place	2017 Pietermaritzburg	Time trial H1
Gold medal – first place	2021 Cascais	Road race H1
Silver medal – second place	2014 Greenville	Time trial H1
Silver medal – second place	2017 Pietermaritzburg	Road Race H1
Silver medal – second place	2018 Maniago	Road race H1
Silver medal – second place	2018 Maniago	Time trial H1
Silver medal – second place	2021 Cascais	Time trial H1
Silver medal – second place	2022 Baie-Comeau	Time trial H1
Silver medal – second place	2025 Ronse	Time trial H1
Bronze medal – third place	2019 Emmen	Time trial H1
Bronze medal – third place	2022 Baie-Comeau	Road race H1
Bronze medal – third place	2023 Glasgow	Road race H1
Bronze medal – third place	2025 Ronse	Road race H1

Nicolas Pieter du Preez (born 1979 or 1980) is a South African athlete in paratriathlon. In 2013, he was the first person with tetraplegia to ever complete an Ironman Triathlon. Du Preez started competing at the Berlin Marathon in 2008 and was a seven-time winner at the event during the 2010s.

In international events, du Preez competed at the 2012 Summer Paralympics in the 100m event and won gold at the 2020 Summer Paralympics in the time trial as a H1 competitor. At the UCI Para-cycling Road World Championships, he has won five golds as part of his thirteen accumulated medals from 2014 to 2022. Outside of his athletic career, du Preez works in risk assessment as an analyst.

== Early life and education ==
Du Preez was born in 1979 or 1980 and spent his childhood in Randburg, South Africa. He graduated with a Bachelor of Science at the University of Johannesburg and completed an honours degree specializing in investment management.

== Career ==
=== Athletics ===
During his childhood, du Preez competed in running, cycling and triathlon. In 2003, he was paralyzed from the chest down after a traffic accident. Du Preez returned to sports in 2005 by competing in wheelchair rugby. He resumed his running career when he ran at the 2008 Berlin Marathon. As a T51 competitor, Du Preez won seven consecutive titles during the 2010s at Berlin.

In other athletic events, du Preez won a silver in the 200m and a bronze in the 100m at the 2011 IPC Athletics World Championships. The following year, du Preez came in 6th place during the Men's 100 metres T51 event at the 2012 Summer Paralympics. After his Paralympic performance, du Preez broke the 10,000 m world record for wheelchair racing in 2015. That same year, he also set new African athletic records in 200 m, 1500 m, and 10,000 m. During his triathlon career, du Preez was the first person with tetraplegia to ever complete an Ironman Triathlon in 2013. In 2018, he participated at the Ironman 70.3 World Championships. At the 2023 World Para Athletics Championships as a T51 competitor, du Preez was seventh in the 200m and eighth in the 100m.

=== Cycling ===
In cycling, du Preez won multiple gold and silver medals at the UCI Para-cycling Road World Championships. His first medals were in 2014 where he was second in time trial and won the road race event. The following year, du Preez won both the time trial and road race events at the 2015 UCI Para-cycling Road World Championships. During the 2017 UCI Para-cycling Road World Championships, du Preez won gold in time trial and silver in road race. In 2018, he won a silver medal in the road race and time trial events.

For the 2019 edition, du Preez won a bronze in time trial and was sixth in road race. For the 2021 UCI Para-cycling Road World Championships, du Preez won gold in the road race and silver in the time trial events. At the 2020 Summer Paralympics held in 2021, du Preez won gold at the time trial for H1 competitors. At the Paralympics, du Preez was also eighth at the road race for H1-2 cyclists. During the 2022 UCI Para-cycling Road World Championships, du Preez won silver in the time tiral and bronze in the road race for H1 competitors. Outside of sports, du Preez is a risk assessment analyst.

== Awards and honors ==
In 2016, du Preez was nominated for the Laureus World Sports Award for Sportsperson of the Year with a Disability.

== Personal life ==
Prior to competing at the Summer Paralympics in 2021, du Preez broke his coracoid process and acromioclavicular joint from a fall. Du Preez is married and has one child.
