= Jean-François Deberg =

Belgian para-cyclist (born 1981)

Personal information
- Nationality: Belgian
- Born: 17 November 1981 (age 44)

Sport
- Sport: Para-cycling
- Disability class: H3
- Club: Rolling Lions
Medal record
Men's Para-cycling
Representing Belgium
Paralympic Games
Bronze medal – third place	2016 Rio de Janeiro	Mixed Team Relay (H2-5)
Road World Championships
Gold medal – first place	2018 Maniago	Road race H3
Silver medal – second place	2019 Emmen	Road race H3

Jean-François Deberg (born 17 November 1981) is a Paralympian sportsman from Belgium. He competes in para-cycling.

== Personal history ==
Deberg was born in Belgium in 1981. He became paraplegic following a car accident in 2002 which caused him to lose the use of his legs. Deberg has dedicated himself to handbike racing since 2007.

== Sporting career ==
Deberg participated in the 2016 Summer Paralympics and 2020 Summer Paralympics. He won a bronze medal in his first Paralympics in Rio de Janeiro as a member of Belgium's team in the mixed team relay. At the same Paralympics, he finished just outside the medals, in 4th place, in the Men's road race H3 while also finishing in 7th place in the Men's road time trial H3. He was less successful in 2020 in Tokyo, failing this time to win a medal, his best finish being 5th in the Men's road race H3.

Since 2013, Deberg participated in 9 world championships. His best result came in the 2018 UCI Para-cycling Road World Championships in Maniago, Italy where he became world champion in the Men's road race H3. A year later, he followed this up with a silver medal in the same event at the 2019 UCI Para-cycling Road World Championships in Emmen, The Netherlands.

== Honours ==
- chevalier du Mérite wallon (November 2016)

== Awards ==
- Trophy Victor Boin (2024)
