= Jady Malavazzi =

Brazilian para-cyclist (born 1994)

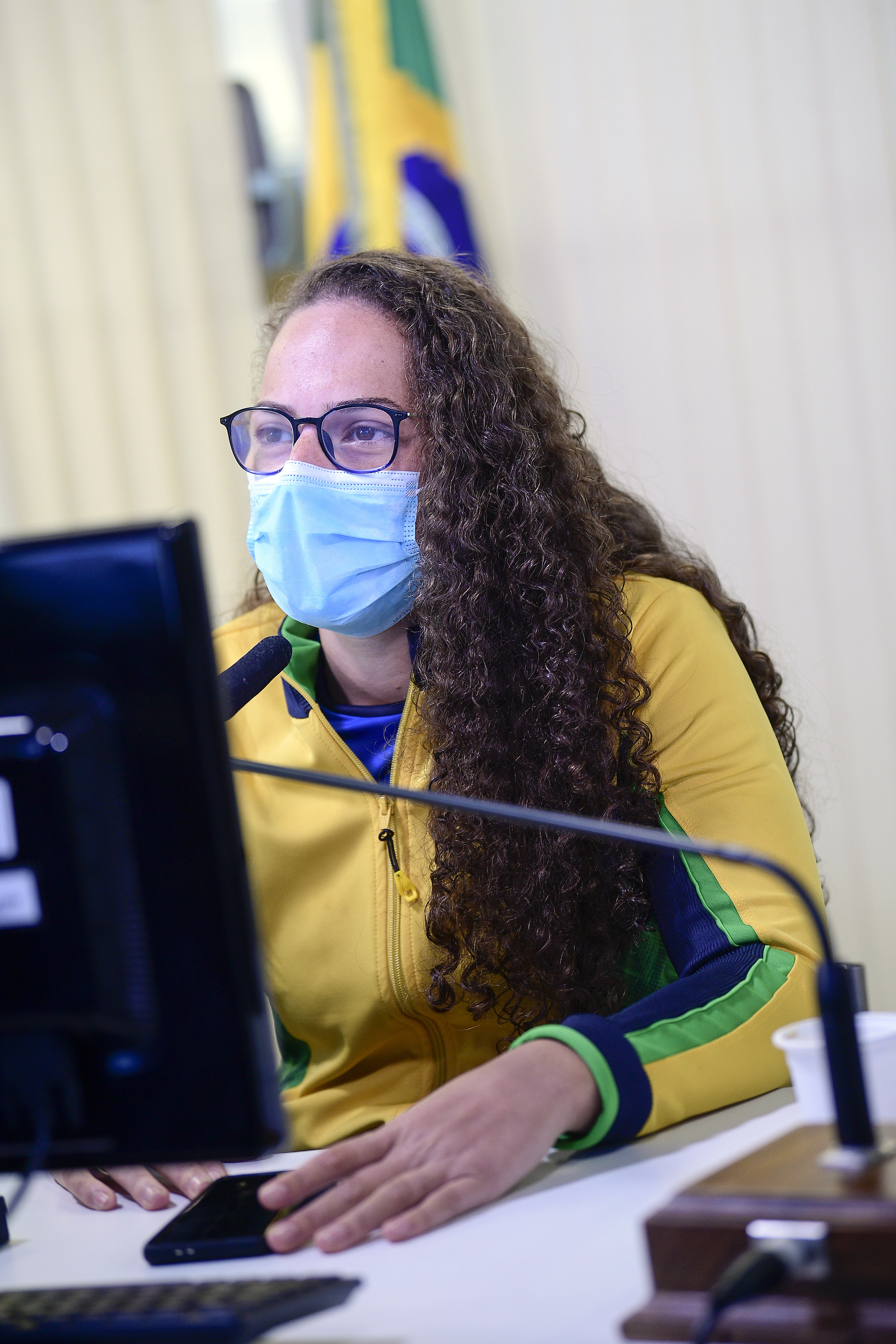
- Malavazzi in 2021

Personal information
- Full name: Jady Martins Malavazzi
- Born: 7 September 1994 (age 32) Jandaia do Sul, Paraná, Brazil

Cycling career
- Sport: Cycling
- Discipline: Road
- Role: Rider
Medal record
Women's para road cycling
Representing Brazil
Road World Championships
Gold medal – first place	2024 Zurich	Road race H3
Bronze medal – third place	2018 Maniago	Time trial H3
Bronze medal – third place	2018 Maniago	Road race H3
Bronze medal – third place	2022 Baie-Comeau	Time trial H3
Bronze medal – third place	2022 Baie-Comeau	Road race H3
Parapan American Games
Gold medal – first place	2023 Santiago	Road race H2–5
Silver medal – second place	2011 Guadalajara	Road race H1M/H1-2W
Silver medal – second place	2023 Santiago	Time trial H1–5
Pan American Road Championships
Gold medal – first place	2022 Maringá	Road race H3
Gold medal – first place	2022 Maringá	Time trial H3

Jady Martins Malavazzi (born 7 September 1994) is a Brazilian para-cyclist. She has represented Brazil in competitions such as the 2011 Parapan American Games, and the 2016, 2020, 2024 Paralympic Games, as well as the Paracycling World Cup among other national and international competitions.

== Background ==
Malavazzi is from Jandaia do Sul in Paraná. She became paraplegic at the age of 12 after suffering a serious car accident in 2007. She began her recovery by playing wheelchair basketball and swimming. The Paraná native practiced both sports for two years, until she decided to take up paracycling in 2010.

== Career ==
The following year, Malavazzi competed in the 2011 Parapan American Games in Guadalajara, Mexico, and won the silver medal in the 30-kilometre road race, which she completed in 1 hour and 19 minutes. Her hometown did not have good conditions for her to practice her sport, so her family moved to Brasília.

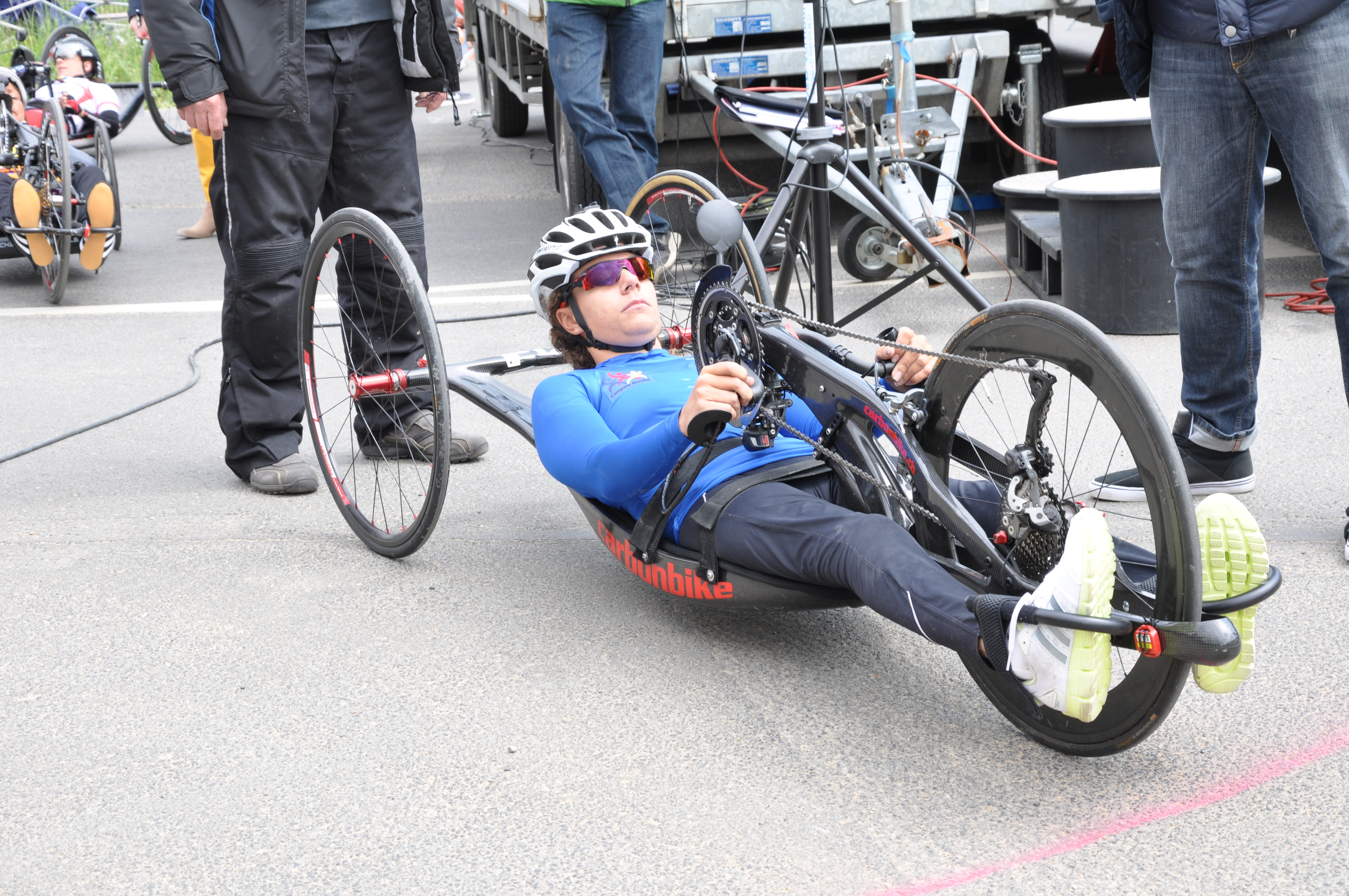
Malavazzi at the 2016 Para-cycling German championships and Europe Cup

In the 2nd stage of the 2016 Brazilian Paracycling Cup, Malavazzi dominated the endurance and time trial events of the women's H3 handbike and won two gold medals. In the 3rd stage, she again won the time trial and endurance events in the same category. After four stages, the Brazilian Paracycling Cup came to an end in Aracajú, Sergipe. Malavazzi scored 120 points and won the title of the women's H3 handbike category. She finished the competition with six gold medals.

Malavazzi represented Brazil at the 2016 Summer Paralympics in Rio de Janeiro.

In May 2017, Malavazzi won the silver medal in the Maniago (Italy) stage of that year's UCI Paracycling World Cup. The athlete completed the 49.7 km course in 1h39min22, behind only the American Alicia Dana. In the Ostend (Belgium) stage, she covered the 15 km race in 31min34s91 and finished 4th in the time trial. Malavazzi also won bronze in the endurance event, completing the 40 km course in 1:21:38. She was beaten by the Italians Francesca Porcellato (gold) and Rita Cucuro (silver). In the Pietermaritzburg (South Africa) stage, she finished fourth in the time trial and endurance events.

In the 2018 Paracycling World Cup, Malavazzi took second place in the Emmen (Netherlands) stage. In August 2018, she won the bronze medal in the time trial at the Para-cycling Road World Championships in Maniago, Italy.

Malavazzi represented Brazil at the 2020 Summer Paralympics in Tokyo. In the H1 to H3 category time trial, she placed seventh. In the H1 to H4 class road race, she placed 13th, clocking 1:06:43.
