= Maximilian Jäger =

German para-cyclist (born 2000)

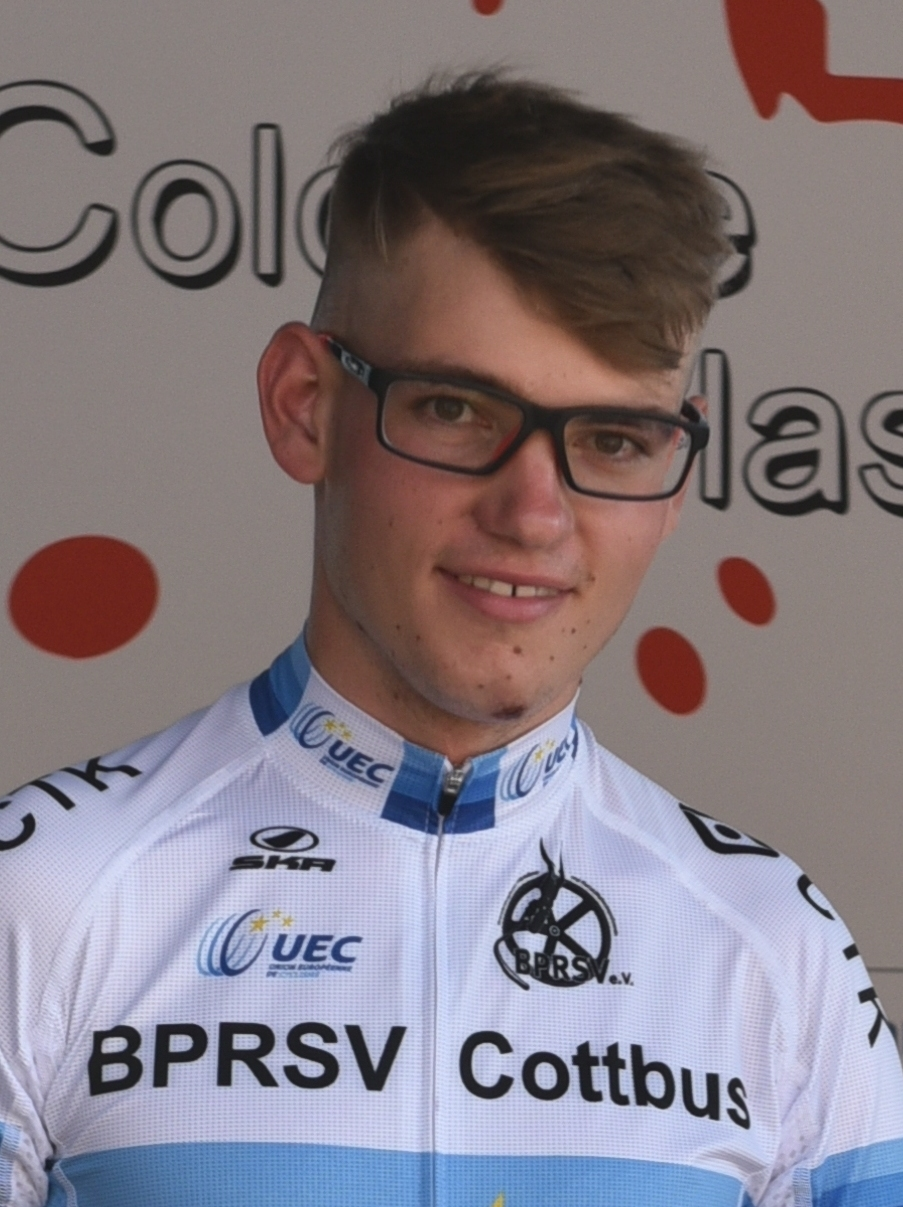
- Jäger in 2022

Personal information
- Nationality: German
- Born: 3 January 2000 (age 26) Bad Kissingen, Germany

Sport
- Sport: Para-cycling
- Disability class: T2
Medal record
Representing Germany
Men's para-cycling
Road World Championships
Gold medal – first place	2023 Glasgow	Time trial T2
Gold medal – first place	2026 Huntsville	Road time trial T2
Silver medal – second place	2018 Maniago	Road race T1
Silver medal – second place	2019 Emmen	Road race T1
Silver medal – second place	2019 Emmen	Time trial T1
Silver medal – second place	2022 Baie-Comeau	Time trial T2
Silver medal – second place	2024 Zurich	Road race T2
Silver medal – second place	2025 Ronse	Time trial T2
Bronze medal – third place	2022 Baie-Comeau	Road race T2
Bronze medal – third place	2023 Glasgow	Road race T2

Maximilian Jäger (born 3 January 2000) is a German Para-cyclist. He represented Germany at the 2024 Summer Paralympics.

== Career ==
In January 2021, Jäger was reclassified from T1 to T2.

In August 2023, Jäger competed at the 2023 UCI Para-cycling Road World Championships and won a gold medal in the time trial T2 event, and a bronze medal in the road race T2 event. He was subsequently named the Junior Para Athlete of the Year by Sporthilfe.

In September 2024, Jäger represented Germany at the 2024 Summer Paralympics and finished in fourth place in the road race T1–2, and eighth place in the time trial T1–2. Weeks later, he then competed at the 2024 UCI Para-cycling Road World Championships and won a silver medal in the road race T2 event, finishing two seconds behind gold medalist Dennis Connors.

== Personal life ==
Jäger suffered a parental stroke and has been paralyzed on the left side of his body since birth.
