= Louis Clincke =

Belgian Para-cyclist

Personal information
- Nationality: Belgian
- Born: 28 December 1986 (age 39) Eeklo, Belgium

Sport
- Sport: Para-cycling
- Disability class: C4
Medal record
Men's para-cycling
Representing Belgium
Road World Championships
Silver medal – second place	2022 Baie-Comeau	Road race C4
Silver medal – second place	2022 Baie-Comeau	Time trial C4
Bronze medal – third place	2018 Maniago	Road race C4

Louis Clincke (born 28 December 1986) is a Belgian Para-cyclist. Louis was severely injured in a frontal head-on collision in 2013, spent a year in hospital and started his para-cycling career in 2017.
