= Stuart Jones (cyclist) =

Australian Paralympic cyclist (born 1969)

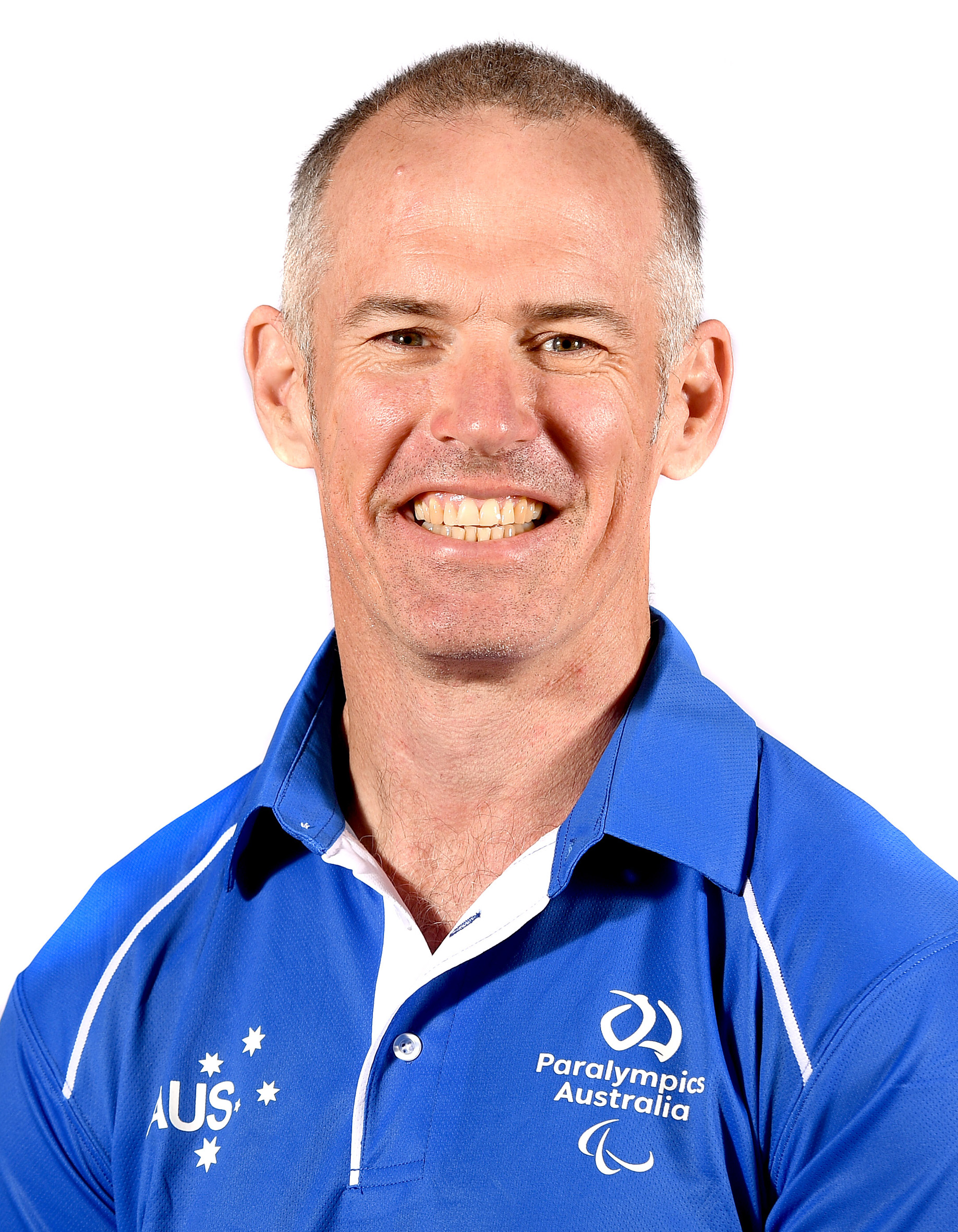
- Jones in 2019

Personal information
- Nationality: Australian
- Born: Brisbane, Queensland

Sport
- Country: Australia
- Sport: Cycling
- Disability class: T2
- Club: Newcastle Cycling Club
Medal record
Cycling
Para-cycling Road Championships
| Silver medal – second place | 2019 Emmen | Men's Time Trial T2 |
| Bronze medal – third place | 2022 Baie-Comeau | Men's Time Trial T2 |

Stuart Jones (born 1969) is an Australian Paralympic cyclist who won silver medal at 2019 UCI Para-cycling Road World Championships. He represented Australia at the 2020 Tokyo Paralympics.

== Personal ==
Jones was born in Brisbane, Queensland and in 2021 lives Maitland, New South Wales. In January 2014, whilst riding to work, he clipped a parked car on the New England Highway at Beresfield, New South Wales. He suffered a fractured skull, two fractured vertebrae in his spine and torn tendons in his hand. His doctors discovered he had no movement down most of the right side of his body, even after surgery to repair his spine. He underwent rehabilitation at Royal North Shore Hospital with a determination to walk and ride again.

He was a military police officer in the Australian Army. He has completed legal qualifications and aims to become a solicitor after 2020 Tokyo Paralympics.

== Cycling ==
Jones is classified as a T2 cyclist. His first major international competition was the 2018 UCI Para-cycling Road World Championships, South Africa where he finished ninth in the Men's Time Trial T2. In 2019, he won bronze medals at two World Cups in the Men's Time Trial T2. At the 2019 UCI Para-cycling Road World Championships, Netherlands, he won the silver medal in the Men's Time Trial T2.

At the 2020 Tokyo Paralympics, he finished fifth in the Men's Road Time Trial T1–2 and eight in the Men's Road Race T1–2. Jones was applauded for his encouragement of South Africa's Toni Mould who was struggling during the Women's Road Race. Jones said" “As a result I knew that Toni wasn’t the best climber, bit like myself,” he said. “At this point I wasn’t going to podium and I knew how hard that climb would be on her own, so I basically ceased my race there and then and put everything into encouraging Toni to climb.” Jones was awarded the New South Wales Institute of Sport 'Spirit of Sport' Award for this act of support. This sportsmanship led to Jones being awarded the Paralympics Australia Uncle Kevin Coombs Medallist.

Jones won the bronze medal in the Men's Time Trial T2 and did not finish in Men's Road Race T2 at the 2022 UCI Para-cycling Road World Championships in Baie-Comeau.

In 2025, he is a member of the Parramatta Cycling Club.

In April 2023, Jones was among paralympians accused of exaggerating or faking their disabilities in order to compete. He was cleared of all accusations and has gone on to complete in Australian Titles and maintains his credential with the NSW Institute of Sport Athlete and Australia Paralympic Athlete.
