= Martin Heggelund =

Danish para-cyclist (born 1983)

Personal information
- Nationality: Danish
- Born: 6 November 1983 (age 42)

Sport
- Sport: Para-cycling
- Disability: Cerebral palsy
- Disability class: T1
Medal record
Men's Para-cycling
Representing Denmark
Road World Championships
Bronze medal – third place	2025 Ronse	Road race T1

Martin Heggelund (born 6 November 1983) is a Danish para-cyclist. He represented Denmark at the 2024 Summer Paralympics.

== Career ==
Heggelund represented Denmark at the 2024 Summer Paralympics in the road race T1–2 and road time trial T1–2 events. In August 2025, he represented Denmark at the 2025 UCI Para-cycling Road World Championships and won a bronze medal in the time trial T1 event with a time of 1:10:39.
