= Tim Celen =

Belgian Para-cyclist

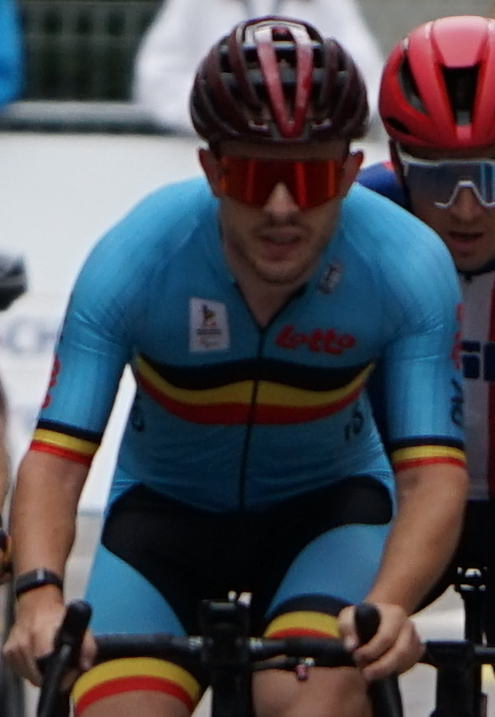
- Celen during the 2024 World Championships

Personal information
- Nationality: Belgian
- Born: 26 February 1998 (age 28) Geel, Belgium

Sport
- Sport: Para-cycling
- Disability: Cerebral palsy
- Disability class: T2
- Club: Ploeg Kemp Sports Paracycling
- Coached by: Remko Meeusen
Medal record
Men's para-cycling
Representing Belgium
Paralympic Games
Silver medal – second place	2020 Tokyo	Road race T1–2
Bronze medal – third place	2024 Paris	Road time trial T1–2
Bronze medal – third place	2020 Tokyo	Road time trial T1–2
Road World Championships
Gold medal – first place	2021 Cascais	Road race T2
Gold medal – first place	2022 Baie-Comeau	Road race T2
Gold medal – first place	2022 Baie-Comeau	Time trial T2
Gold medal – first place	2025 Ronse	Time trial T2
Gold medal – first place	2025 Ronse	Road race T2
Gold medal – first place	2026 Huntsville	Road race T2
Silver medal – second place	2023 Glasgow	Time trial T2
Silver medal – second place	2023 Glasgow	Road race T2
Silver medal – second place	2024 Zurich	Time trial T2

Tim Celen (born 26 February 1998) is a Belgian Para-cyclist who represented Belgium at the Paralympic Games.

== Career ==
Celen represented Belgium at the 2016 Summer Paralympics. He again represented Belgium at the 2020 Summer Paralympics where he won a silver medal in the road race T1–2 event and a bronze medal in the men's road time trial T1–2 event.
