= Sergio Garrote Muñoz =

Spanish para-cyclist

Sergio Garrote
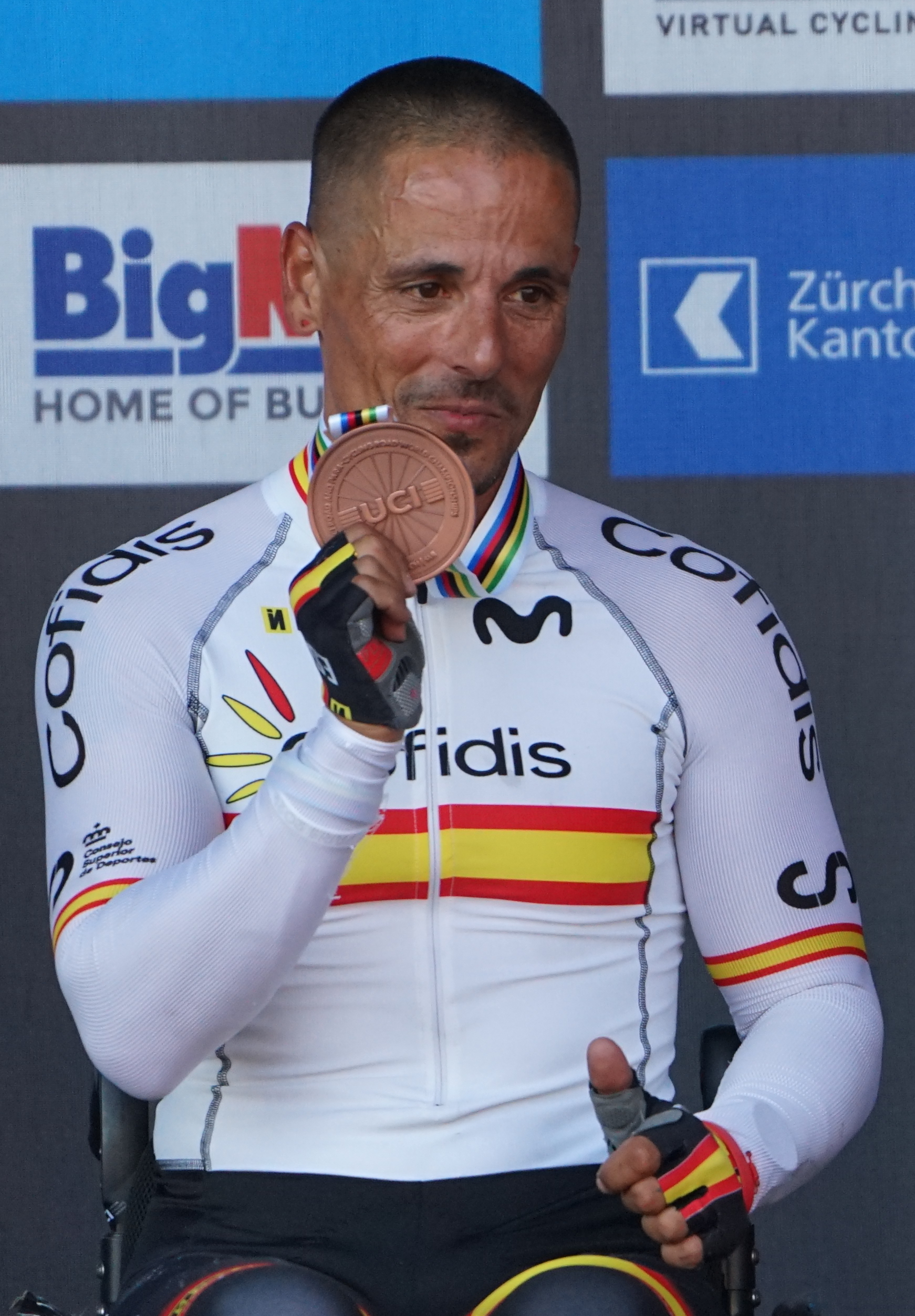
- Muñoz at the 2024 UCI Para-cycling Road World Championships

Personal information
- Full name: Sergio Garrote Muñoz
- Nationality: Spanish
- Born: 27 July 1979 (age 46) Barcelona, Spain

Sport
- Sport: Para-cycling
- Disability class: H2
Medal record
Men's para-cycling
Representing Spain
Paralympic Games
Gold medal – first place	2020 Tokyo	Road time trial H2
Gold medal – first place	2024 Paris	Road time trial H2
Silver medal – second place	2024 Paris	Road race H1–2
Bronze medal – third place	2020 Tokyo	Road race H1–2
Road World Championships
Gold medal – first place	2022 Baie-Comeau	Time trial H2
Gold medal – first place	2024 Zurich	Road race H2
Silver medal – second place	2021 Cascais	Road race H2
Silver medal – second place	2021 Cascais	Time trial H2
Silver medal – second place	2023 Glasgow	Road race H2
Silver medal – second place	2025 Ronse	Road race H2
Silver medal – second place	2025 Ronse	Time trial H2
Bronze medal – third place	2017 Pietermaritzburg	Time trial H2
Bronze medal – third place	2017 Pietermaritzburg	Road race H2
Bronze medal – third place	2022 Baie-Comeau	Road race H2
Bronze medal – third place	2024 Zurich	Time trial H2
Bronze medal – third place	2024 Zurich	Mixed team relay H1–5
European Para Championships
Gold medal – first place	2023 Rotterdam	Time trial H2
Silver medal – second place	2023 Rotterdam	Road race H2

Sergio Garrote Muñoz (born 27 July 1979) is a Spanish Para-cyclist who has represented Spain at the 2020 and 2024 Summer Paralympics.

== Career ==
Garrote Muñoz represented Spain in the men's road time trial H2 event at the 2020 Summer Paralympics and won a gold medal. He also won a bronze medal in the men's road race H1–2 event. At the 2024 Summer Paralympics he retained the title as Paralympic champion in the men's road time trial H2 and won the silver medal in the men's road race H1-2 event.

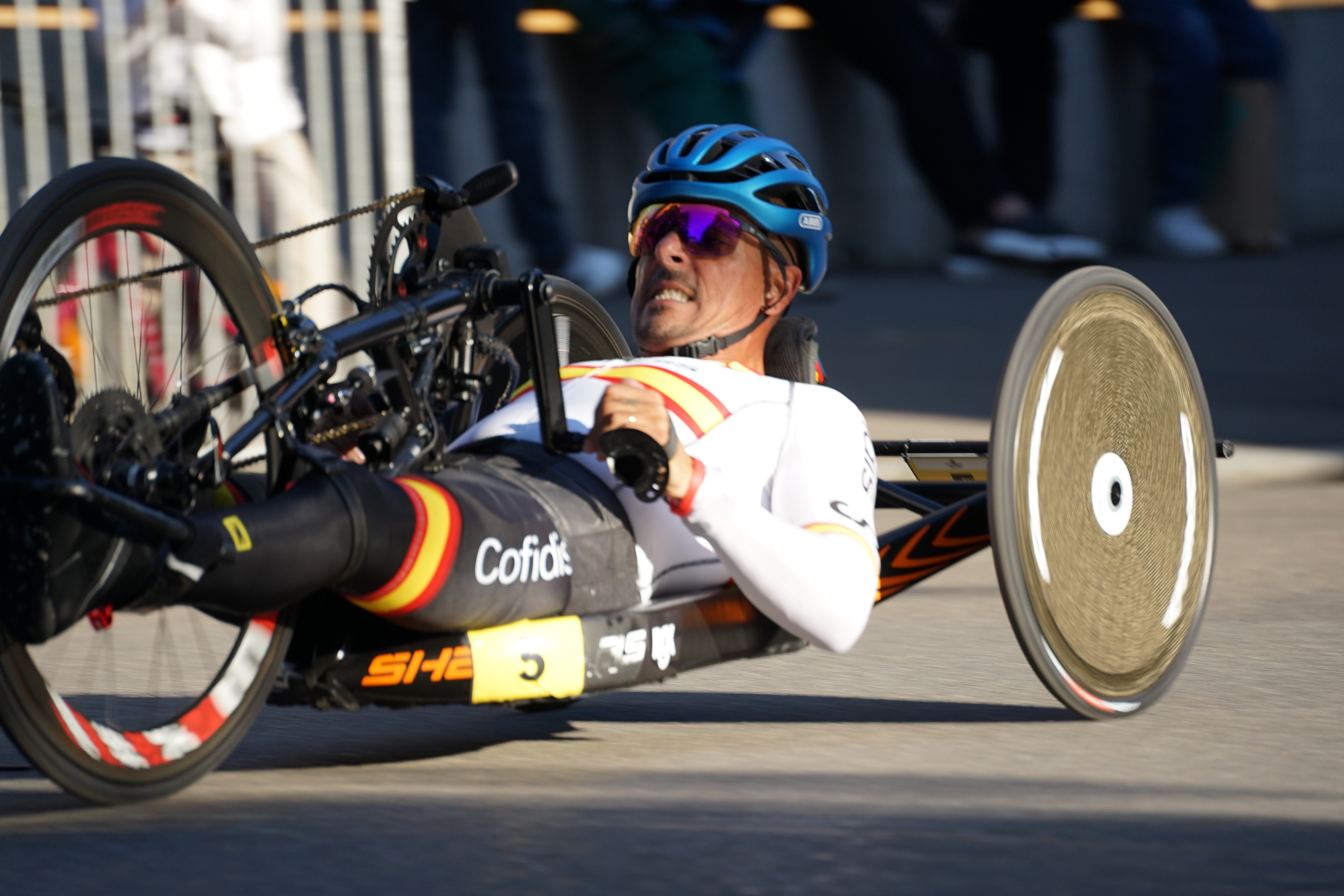
During the race at the 2024 UCI Para-cycling road World Championships
