= Kaitlyn Schurmann =

Australian Paralympic cyclist

Personal information
- Full name: Kaitlyn Schurmann
- Nationality: Australia
- Born: 16 November 1998 (age 27)

Sport
- Disability class: C1 (Cycling)
- Club: Geelong Cycling Club
- Coached by: Loz Shaw
Medal record
Women's cycling
Representing Australia
Road World Championships
Silver medal – second place	2018 Maniago	Time trial C1
Silver medal – second place	2018 Maniago	Road race C1
Silver medal – second place	2022 Baie-Comeau	Time trial C1
Bronze medal – third place	2019 Emmen	Time trial C1
Bronze medal – third place	2019 Emmen	Road race C1
Silver medal – second place	2022 Baie-Comeau	Women's Time Trial C1
Silver medal – second place	2022 Baie-Comeau	Women's Road Race C1

Kaitlyn Schurmann (born 16 November 1998) is an Australian Paralympic road cyclist.

== Personal ==
Schurmann was born on 16 November 1996 with cerebral palsy. She attended Clonard College in Geelong . In 2019, she is undertaking a Bachelor of International Studies / Bachelor of Commerce student at Deakin University.

== Cycling ==
Schurmann began cycling at the age of 13 after attending a junior try out day at the Geelong Cycling Club. In her debut for the Australian Cycling Team, she won silver medals in the Women Time Trial C1 and Women's Road Race C1 at the UCI Para-cycling Road World Championships in Italy. At the 2019, UCI Para-cycling Road World Championships in Netherlands, she won bronze medals in the Women's Time Trial C1 and Women's Road Race C1.

At the 2022 UCI Para-cycling Road World Championships in Baie-Comeau, she won silver medals in the Women's Time Trial and Road Race C1 events.

She is a member of the Geelong Cycling Club and coached by Loz Shaw.

== Recognition ==
- 2022 - South Australian Sports Institute Para Athlete of the Year
