= Eltje Malzbender =

New Zealand para-cyclist

Personal information
- Born: 15 May 1962 (age 64) Germany

Sport
- Country: New Zealand
- Sport: Cycling
- Disability class: T1
Medal record
Women's cycling
Representing New Zealand
Road World Championships
Gold medal – first place	2019 Emmen	Time trial T1
Gold medal – first place	2019 Emmen	Road race T1
Silver medal – second place	2023 Glasgow	Time trial T1
Silver medal – second place	2023 Glasgow	Road race T1
Bronze medal – third place	2024 Zurich	Time trial T1
Bronze medal – third place	2024 Zurich	Road Race T1

Eltje Malzbender (born 15 May 1962) is a German-born New Zealand para-cyclist. She won two gold medals – one in the Tricycle 1 Road Race event, the other in the Tricycle 1 Time Trial event – at the 2019 UCI Para-cycling Road World Championships in Emmen, Netherlands.
