= Maxime Hordies =

Belgian para-cyclist (born 1996)

Personal information
- Nationality: Belgian
- Born: 13 March 1996 (age 30)

Sport
- Sport: Para-cycling
- Disability class: H1
- Coached by: Remko Meeusen
Medal record
Men's Para-cycling
Representing Belgium
Paralympic Games
Silver medal – second place	2024 Paris	Road time trial H1
Bronze medal – third place	2020 Tokyo	Road time trial H1
Road World Championships
Gold medal – first place	2019 Emmen	Road race H1
Gold medal – first place	2022 Baie-Comeau	Road race H1
Gold medal – first place	2023 Glasgow	Road race H1
Gold medal – first place	2024 Zürich	Road race H1
Silver medal – second place	2019 Emmen	Time trial H1
Silver medal – second place	2023 Glasgow	Time trial H1
Bronze medal – third place	2021 Cascais	Time trial H1
Bronze medal – third place	2021 Cascais	Road race H1
Bronze medal – third place	2022 Baie-Comeau	Time trial H1
Bronze medal – third place	2024 Zurich	Time trial H1

Maxime Hordies (born 13 March 1996) is a former Belgian para-cyclist who represented Belgium at the 2020 and 2024 Summer Paralympics.

== Career ==
Hordies represented Belgium in the men's road time trial H1 event at the 2020 Summer Paralympics and won a bronze medal. He won the 2023 Trophy Victor Boin.

Hordies competed at the 2024 UCI Para-cycling Road World Championships and won his third consecutive Road World Championships gold medal in the road race H1 event on 26 September 2024, and then announced his retirement.
