= Juan José Betancourt Quiroga =

Colombian para-cyclist

Personal information
- Nationality: Colombian
- Born: 15 July 1999 (age 26)

Sport
- Sport: Para-cycling
- Disability class: T2
Medal record
Men's para-cycling
Representing Colombia
Paralympic Games
Bronze medal – third place	2020 Tokyo	Road race T1–2
Bronze medal – third place	2024 Paris	Road race T1–2
Parapan American Games
Silver medal – second place	2023 Santiago	Road race T1-2
Bronze medal – third place	2023 Santiago	Time trial T1-2
Pan American Road Championships
Gold medal – first place	2022 Maringá	Road race T2
Gold medal – first place	2022 Maringá	Time trial T2

Juan José Betancourt Quiroga (born 15 July 1999) is a Colombian Para-cyclist. He represented Colombia in the 2020 Summer Paralympics.

== Career ==
Betancourt Quiroga represented Colombia in the 2020 Summer Paralympics. He won the bronze medal in the Road race T1–2 event.
