= Patrik Jahoda =

Czech para-cyclist (born 1993)

Personal information
- Nationality: Czech
- Born: 26 June 1993 (age 33) Prague, Czech Republic

Sport
- Sport: Para-cycling
- Disability class: H1
Medal record
Men's Para-cycling
Representing Czech Republic
Road World Championships
Bronze medal – third place	2025 Ronse	Time trial H1
European Championships
Silver medal – second place	2023 Rotterdam	Time trial H1
Bronze medal – third place	2023 Rotterdam	Road race H1

Patrik Jahoda (born 26 June 1993) is a Czech para-cyclist. He represented the Czech Republic at the 2020 and 2024 Summer Paralympics.

== Early life ==
Jahoda was born and raised in Prague, where he was a water skier. In 2008 he suffered a life-changing spinal cord injury and began para-cycling.

== Career ==
Jahoda made his Paralympic Games debut for the Czech Republic at the 2020 Summer Paralympics in the road time trial H1 event and finished in fourth place with a time of 52:56.13. He again represented the Czech Republic at the 2024 Summer Paralympics in the road time trial H1 event and finished in fourth place with a time of 37:50.51.

In August 2025, he represented the Czech Republic at the 2025 UCI Para-cycling Road World Championships and won a bronze medal in the time trial H1 event with a time of 27:44.49.
