= H2 (classification) =

Para-cycling classification

H2 is a para-cycling classification. The Union Cycliste Internationale recommends this be coded as MH2 or WH2.

== Definition ==
Functional mobility range of an H2 classified cyclist

Union Cycliste Internationale (UCI) defines H2 as:

- Tetraplegia C7/C8 and severe athetosis/ataxia/dystonia
- Tetraplegic with impairments corresponding to a complete cervical lesion at C7/C8 or above
- Complete loss of trunk stability and lower limb function
- Non-spinal cord injury, but functional ability profile equivalent to sport class H2 (ex-H1.2)
- Impaired sympathetic nerve system
- Recumbent position in handbike mandatory (AP-bikes)
- Severe athetosis/ataxia/dystonia and no elbow extension limitation
- Asymmetric or symmetric quadriplegia with at least grade 2 spasticity in upper limb and lower limbs.

== The cycle ==
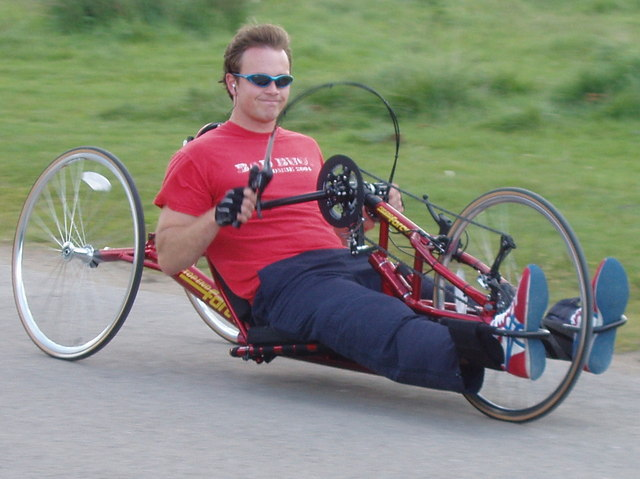
An AP2 handcycle

This classification can use an AP2 recumbent, which is a competition cycle that is reclined at 30 degrees and has a rigid frame. This classification can also use an AP3 hand cycle which is inclined at 0 degrees and is reclined on a rigid competition frame.

== Classification history ==
Cycling first became a Paralympic sport at the 1988 Summer Paralympics. In September 2006, governance for para-cycling passed from the International Paralympic Committee's International Cycling Committee to UCI at a meeting in Switzerland. When this happened, the responsibility of classifying the sport also changed.

== At the Paralympic Games ==
For the 2016 Summer Paralympics in Rio, the International Paralympic Committee had a zero classification at the Games policy. This policy was put into place in 2014, with the goal of avoiding last minute changes in classes that would negatively impact athlete training preparations. All competitors needed to be internationally classified with their classification status confirmed prior to the Games, with exceptions to this policy being dealt with on a case-by-case basis.

== Competitors ==
Competitors in this classification include Heinz Frei (Switzerland) and Luca Mazzone (Italy).

== Rankings ==
This classification has UCI rankings for elite competitors.

== Becoming classified ==
Classification is handled by Union Cycliste Internationale. Classification for the UCI Para-Cycling World Championships is completed by at least two classification panels. Members of the classification panel must not have a relationship with the cyclist and must not be involved in the World Championships in any other role than as classifier. In national competitions, the classification is handled by the national cycling federation. Classification often has three components: physical, technical and observation assessment.
