= Alicia Dana =

American Paralympic cyclist

Personal information
- Full name: Alicia Throm Brelsford Dana
- Born: February 12, 1969 (age 57) Brattleboro, Vermont, U.S.
Medal record
Women's para cycling
Representing the United States
Paralympic Games
Silver medal – second place	2016 Rio	Women's Time Trial H1-3
Bronze medal – third place	2020 Tokyo	Women's Road Race H1-4
Bronze medal – third place	2020 Tokyo	Mixed Team Relay H1-5

Alicia Throm Brelsford Dana (born February 12, 1969) is an American Paralympian. She qualified for the United States Paralympics Cycling National Team in 2001 and competed at the 2002 UCI Para-cycling Track World Championships before taking a break to raise her daughter. She returned to the sport in 2011 and competed in various international competitions including the UCI Para-cycling Road World Championships and Summer Paralympic Games.

== Early life ==
Dana was born on February 12, 1969, in Brattleboro, Vermont to parents Edmund and Veronica Brelsford. While attending The Putney School, Dana was climbing a tree when the branch broke and she fell, breaking her back and paralyzing her from the waist down. At the time, she had just begun cycling at the national level and was ranked among the best cyclists and cross country skiers in the state. Dana had competed at two cycling nationals and various cross-country Junior Nationals. After graduating from The Putney School, Dana attended Marlboro College and the Rhode Island School of Design where she majored in Illustration.

Dana tried adaptive skiing and wheelchair racing before purchasing a handcycling bike. In 2000, she cycled across the United States from Washington to Vermont in order to raise funds for disability-related causes, Dana and a group of other cyclers spent 10 weeks cycling, averaging 70 miles per day. However, due to wildfires in Montana, they had to divert from their original route and shuttle 50 miles.

== Career ==
Dana attended the United States Paralympics Cycling National Team tryouts in 2001 and qualified to compete on their roster at the 2002 UCI Para-cycling Track World Championships. Following the competition, she decided to take a break from the sport to raise her daughter Willa in Putney. Her break became extended following a divorce, the theft of her handcycle, and her father's death within 10 years. Dana's friend encouraged her to participate in the Burlington City Marathon and after winning first place in her division, she chose to come back to hand-cycling competitively.

When Dana returned to paralympic athletics, she participated in both sit-ski racing and hand-cycling, earning medals in both categories. In 2011, Dana competed in her first sit-ski racing competition United States Nationals in Rumford, Maine, winning a gold and a bronze medal. As a result, she was invited to participate in the Paralympic World Cup representing the United States. Dana also returned to hand-cycling in 2011 and re-qualified for the United States Paralympics Cycling National Team the following year. At her first Summer Paralympic Games in 2012, Dana placed fifth in the road time trial. As a result, she was recruited again for the national team in 2013.

In 2014, Dana became the fastest woman's H3 Para-cyclist in the world after winning gold at the UCI Para-cycling Road World Championships, beating Karen Darke and Renata Kaluza. The following year, she won two gold medals in the time trial and the road race at the Union Cycliste Internationale Para-cycling Road World Cup and two silver medals at the UCI Para-cycling Road World Championships. In her gold medal races, she was the only athlete representing the United States amongst 13 other competitors in her class. On January 3, 2016, Dana was among the 27 athletes named to Team USAs Paralympics Cycling National Team for the 2016 Summer Paralympics in Rio. In order to train for the event, Dana worked out six days a week year-round including at the gym or on a stationary trainer in her garage. She also communicated with her national team trainer Rick Babington in southern California and biked on paved roads to test her endurance. During the Games, Dana earned her first Paralympic silver medal as she placed second behind Darke in the H1-3 category with a time of 12.55 seconds. She also competed in the Women's Road Race H1-4 where she ranked fourth.

Following the Paralympics, Dana earned two gold medals for the United States at the 2019 International Cycling Union (UCI) Para-cycling Road World Cup in the women's H3 time trial and road race. She also won her first national title since 2014 at the 2019 UCI Para-cycling Road World Championships with a time of 34:41.53, over 30 seconds faster than the second-place finisher. Prior to the COVID-19 pandemic, Dana was chosen to compete at the 2020 Summer Paralympics, which were later postponed to 2021.
