= Fabrizio Cornegliani =

Italian para-cyclist

Personal information
- Nationality: Italian
- Born: 12 March 1969 (age 57) Miradolo Terme

Sport
- Sport: Para-cycling
- Disability class: H1
Medal record
Women's Para-cycling
Representing Italy
Paralympic Games
Gold medal – first place	2024 Paris	Road time trial H1
Silver medal – second place	2020 Tokyo	Road time trial H1
Road World Championships
Gold medal – first place	2021 Cascais	Time trial H1
Gold medal – first place	2022 Baie-Comeau	Time trial H1
Gold medal – first place	2024 Zurich	Time trial H1
Gold medal – first place	2025 Ronse	Time trial H1
Gold medal – first place	2025 Ronse	Road race H1
Silver medal – second place	2021 Cascais	Road race H1
Silver medal – second place	2022 Baie-Comeau	Road race H1
Silver medal – second place	2023 Glasgow	Road race H1
Silver medal – second place	2024 Zurich	Road race H1
Bronze medal – third place	2017 Pietermaritzburg	Road race H1
European Championships
Gold medal – first place	2023 Rotterdam	Time trial H1
Gold medal – first place	2023 Rotterdam	Road race H1

Fabrizio Cornegliani (born 12 March 1969) is an Italian Para-cyclist who represented Italy at the 2020 and 2024 Summer Paralympics.

== Career ==
Cornegliani represented Italy in the men's road time trial H1 event at the 2020 Summer Paralympics and won a silver medal.
