= Chen Jianxin (cyclist) =

Chinese Para-cyclist

Personal information
- Nationality: Chinese
- Born: 7 September 1986 (age 40) Jiangmen, China

Sport
- Sport: Para-cycling
- Disability: Cerebral palsy
- Disability class: T1
Medal record
Men's para-cycling
Representing China
Paralympic Games
Gold medal – first place	2020 Tokyo	Road time trial T1–2
Gold medal – first place	2020 Tokyo	Road race T1–2
Gold medal – first place	2024 Paris	Road time trial T1–2
Gold medal – first place	2024 Paris	Road race T1–2
Road World Championships
Gold medal – first place	2026 Huntsville	Road time trial T1
Silver medal – second place	2023 Glasgow	Road race T1

Chen Jianxin (born 7 September 1986) is a Chinese Para-cyclist. He represented China at the 2020 and 2024 Summer Paralympics.

== Career ==
Jianxin represented China in the men's road time trial T1–2 event at the 2020 Summer Paralympics and won a gold medal. He also competed in the men's road race T1–2 event and won a gold medal.
