= H1 (classification) =

Para-cycling classification

H1 is a para-cycling classification. It includes people with a number of disability types including spinal cord injuries and cerebral palsy. Handcycles that can be used by people in races include the AP2 recumbent and AP3 recumbent. The classification competes at the Paralympic Games and has international rankings done by the UCI.

== Definition ==
Functional mobility range of an H1 classified cyclist

Union Cycliste Internationale (UCI) defines H1 as:

- Tetraplegia C6 or above and severe athetosis/ataxia/dystonia
- Tetraplegic with impairments corresponding to a complete cervical lesion at C6 or above
- Complete loss of trunk stability and lower limb function
- Limited extension of the elbow with a muscle score of 6 (total of both tri- ceps)
- Limited handgrip
- Non-spinal cord injury, but functional ability profile equivalent to sport class H 1.1
- Impaired sympathetic nerve system
- Recumbent position in handbike mandatory (AP-bikes)
- Severe athetosis/ataxia/dystonia and elbow extension limitation
- Asymmetric or symmetric quadriplegia with at least grade 3 spasticity in upper limbs and lower limbs.

The UCI recommends this be coded as MH1 or WH1.

== Disability groups ==
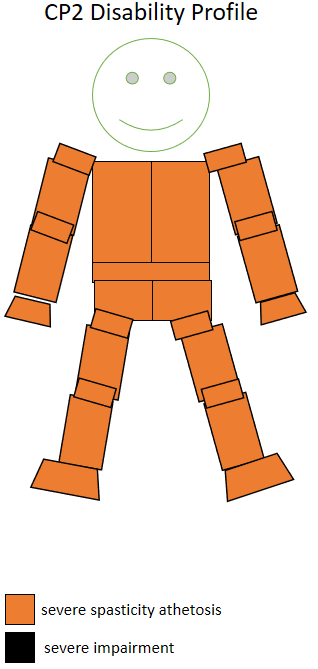
The spasticity athetosis level and location of a CP2 sportsperson.

People with cerebral palsy are one of the classes eligible to compete in this class, including CP/ISRA CP2 classified cyclists. All CP2 cyclists are required to wear a helmet, with a special color used to designate their class. Their helmet color is red.

CP2 cyclists tend to use electric wheelchairs in everyday life. They may have controlled shakes and twitches. This bodily activity can spike their metabolic rate. They can operate a manual wheelchair but this is restricted because of motor control issues. Functional control issues effect all or most of their limbs. When participating in sport, CP2 competitors tend to have low energy expenditure.

== The cycle ==
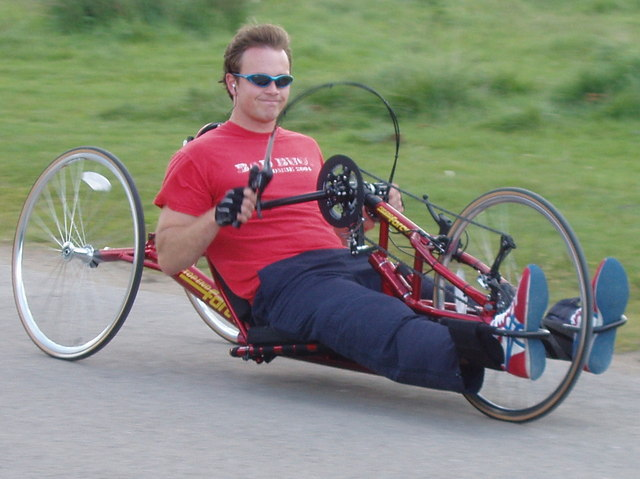
An AP2 handcycle

This classification can use an AP2 recumbent, which is a competition cycle that is reclined at 30 degrees and has a rigid frame. This classification can also use an AP3 hand cycle which is inclined at 0 degrees and is reclined on a rigid competition frame.

== Classification history ==
Cycling first became a Paralympic sport at the 1988 Summer Paralympics. In September 2006, governance for para-cycling passed from the International Paralympic Committee's International Cycling Committee to UCI at a meeting in Switzerland. When this happened, the responsibility of classifying the sport also changed.

== At the Paralympic Games ==
For the 2016 Summer Paralympics in Rio, the International Paralympic Committee had a zero classification at the Games policy. This policy was put into place in 2014, with the goal of avoiding last minute changes in classes that would negatively impact athlete training preparations. All competitors needed to be internationally classified with their classification status confirmed prior to the Games, with exceptions to this policy being dealt with on a case-by-case basis.

== Rankings ==
The following are the men's rankings for this classification As of June 2012:

Rank	Name	Nation	Points	References
1 (1)	Rodolph Cecillon	France	67	
2 (-)	Mark Rohan	Ireland	63	
3 (-)	Yakov Lion	Israel	63	
4 (3)	Christoph Hindricq	Belgium	59	
5 (-)	Wolfgang Schattauer	Austria	54	
6 (5)	Patrick Pascal	France	53	
7 (-)	Robert LabbÉ	Canada	52	
8 (2)	Alain Quittet	France	47	
9 (-)	Tobias Fankhauser	Switzerland	40	
10 (4)	Christophe Marchal	France	18	
11 (-)	Martin KovÁr	Czech Republic	17	
12 (-)	Christoph Etzlstorfer	Austria	17	
13 (-)	Pavel FoltÝn	Czech Republic	6	
13 (-)	Omar Rizzato	Italy	6	
15 (-)	Torben BrÖer	Germany	5	
16 (-)	Attilio Cortello	Italy	4	
17 (-)	Ivano Da Canal	Italy	3	
17 (-)	Federico Villa	Italy	3	

== Becoming classified ==
Classification is handled by Union Cycliste Internationale. Classification for the UCI Para-Cycling World Championships is completed by at least two classification panels. Members of the classification panel must not have a relationship with the cyclist and must not be involved in the World Championships in any other role than as classifier. In national competitions, the classification is handled by the national cycling federation. Classification often has three components: physical, technical and observation assessment.
