= Para cycling classification =

Process of classifying disabled cycling participants

Para cycling classification is the process of classifying participants in Para cycling covering four functional disability types. The classification system includes classes for handcycles for people who have lower limb mobility issues. The sport is governed by the Union Cycliste Internationale (UCI).

== Definition ==
There are fourteen classifications based on functional disability type. The blind classifications are based on medical classification, not functional mobility classification.

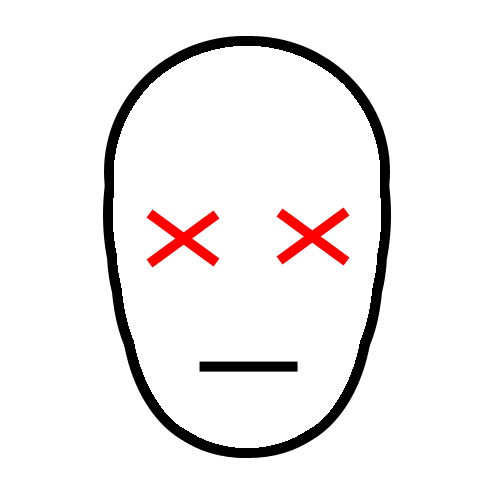
Visualisation of functional vision for a B1 competitor

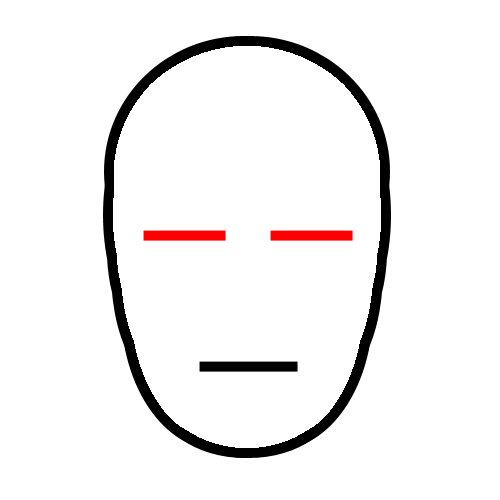
Visualisation of functional vision for a B2 competitor

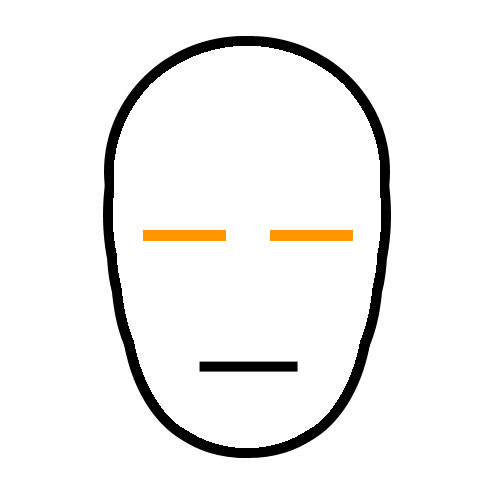
Visualisation of functional vision for a B3 competitor

Functional mobility range of an H1 classified cyclist

Functional mobility range of an H2 classified cyclist

Beyond the level of vision impairment, research done at the Central Institute on Employment Abilities of the Handicapped in Moscow has found differences in functional capabilities based on differences in visual acuity. This does not play a significant role in tandem cycling.

== Governance ==
Classification is handled by the Union Cycliste Internationale (UCI). While the CP-ISRA has an interest in the sport because it is open to people with cerebral palsy, it is not governed by them. In 1983, the rules for this sport and approval for classification was done by the UCI coordinated Federation Internationale de Amateur de Cyclisme.

== Eligibility ==
As of 2012, people with physical and visual disabilities are eligible to compete in this sport. In 1983, Cerebral Palsy-International Sports and Recreation Association (CP-ISRA) set the eligibility rules for classification for this sport. They defined cerebral palsy as a non-progressive brain lesion that results in impairment. People with cerebral palsy or non-progressive brain damage were eligible for classification by them. The organisation also dealt with classification for people with similar impairments. For their classification system, people with spina bifida were not eligible unless they had medical evidence of loco-motor dysfunction. People with cerebral palsy and epilepsy were eligible provided the condition did not interfere with their ability to compete. People who had strokes were eligible for classification following medical clearance. Competitors with multiple sclerosis, muscular dystrophy and arthrogryposis were not eligible for classification by CP-ISRA, but were eligible for classification by International Sports Organisation for the Disabled for the Games of Les Autres.

== History ==
In 1983, classification for cerebral palsy competitors in this sport was done by the Cerebral Palsy-International Sports and Recreation Association. The classification used the classification system designed for track events. In 1983, there were five cerebral palsy classifications. By the early 1990s, cycling classification had moved away from medical based system to a functional classification system. Because of issues in objectively identifying functionality that plagued the post Barcelona Games, the IPC unveiled plans to develop a new classification system in 2003. This classification system went into effect in 2007, and defined ten different disability types that were eligible to participate on the Paralympic level. The IPC Classification Code, which all Para cycling classification must comply with, was introduced in 2007, updated in 2015, and revised again with a new version in force from 2025. Each reform requires a corresponding review of the Para cycling classification system to ensure compliance. It required that classification be sport specific, and served two roles. The first was that it determined eligibility to participate in the sport and that it created specific groups of sportspeople who were eligible to participate and in which class. The IPC left it up to International Federations to develop their own classification systems within this framework, with the specification that their classification systems use an evidence based approach developed through research.

The debate about inclusion of competitors into able-bodied competitions was seen by some disability sport advocates like Horst Strokhkendl as a hindrance to the development of an independent classification system not based on the rules for able-bodied sport. These efforts ended by 1993 as the International Paralympic Committee tried to carve out its own identity and largely ceased efforts for inclusion of disability sport on the Olympic programme.

== Classes ==
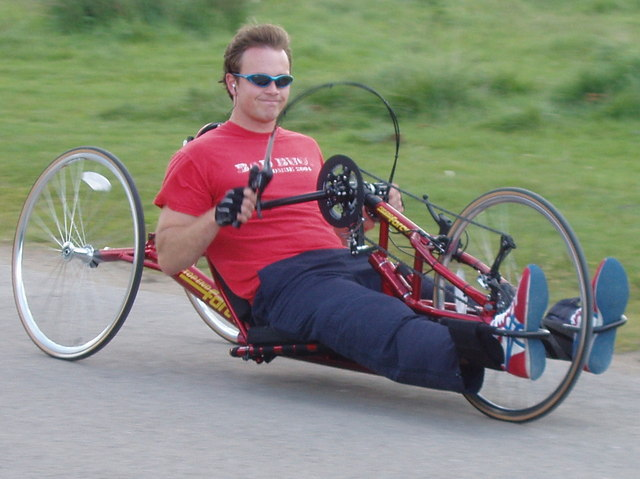
An AP2 handcycle

Classification for Para cycling is done for four types of cycling equipment — (1) upright bicycles, (2) handcycles, (3) tricycles, and (4) tandem bicycles. For each type of equipment, the classifications are based on disability type or level. Classification numbers indicate the severity level of limitation, with 1 being the most severe, for example the lower numbers indicate both lower and upper limb limitations, whereas, the higher numbers apply to athletes with only lower limb limitations.

- Upright bicycles: For using a "standard" bicycle, there are five sports classes, C1-C5.
- Handcycles: For using a handcycle, there are five sports classes, H1-H5.
- Tricycles: There are two sports classes, T1-T2. Athletes in the T class have conditions with significant co-ordination limitations.
- Tandem bicycles: For using a tandem bicycle, athletes with visual impairments compete with a sighted "pilot" riding in the front seat.

	Cycling	Handbike	Tricycle	Blind/VI	Tandem
Men	MC1 - MC5	MH1 - MH5	MT1 - MT2	MB	TCB
Women	WC1 - WC5	WH1 - WH5	WT1 - WT2	WB	TCB

Para cycling classes, as defined by the UCI, can be decoded easily. The first letter stands for the gender (M for men, W for women). Subsequent letters stand for the sport division (C for Cycling; H for Handbike, T for Tricycle, B for blind or visually impaired - also known as TCB for Tandem Class Blind). The final number is the class in that division - with the lower the number, the greater the degree of impairment. Therefore WH3 stands for the class Women's Handbike 3.

The International Paralympic Committee lists eligible impairment types as:

- Impaired muscle power
- Athetosis
- Impaired passive range of movement
- Hypertonia
- Limb deficiency
- Ataxia
- Leg length difference
- Vision Impairment

=== Cycling ===
Athletes have a physical impairment that prevents them from competing in able-bodied competition but still compete using a "standard bicycle". There are five classes of cycling:

- C1: severe hemiplegic or diplegic spasticity; severe athetosis or ataxia; bilateral through knee amputation, etc.
- C2: moderate hemiplegic or diplegic spasticity; moderate athetosis or ataxia; unilateral above knee amputation, etc.
- C3: moderate hemiplegic or diplegic spasticity; moderate athetosis or ataxia; bilateral below knee or unilateral through knee amputation, etc.
- C4: mild hemiplegic or diplegic spasticity; mild athetosis or ataxia; unilateral below knee or bilateral below elbow amputation, etc.
- C5: mild monoplegic spasticity; unilateral arm amputation (above or below elbow), etc.

=== Handbike or hand cycling ===
Athletes have lower limb impairment that necessitates use of a hand-operated cycle. There are five classes of hand cycling:

- H1: tetraplegics with severe upper limb impairment to the C6 vertebra
- H2: tetraplegics with minor upper limb impairment from C7 thru T3
- H3: paraplegics with impairment from T4 thru T10
- H4: paraplegics with impairment from T11 down, and amputees unable to kneel
- H5: athletes who can kneel on a handcycle, a category that includes paraplegics and amputees

In hand-cycling classifications, H1 and H2 can use an AP1 and AP2 handcycle, H3 can use an AP2, AP3 and ATP2 handcycle, and H4 can use an ATP3 handcycle.

=== Tricycle ===
Athletes have an impairment which affects their balance. They compete with a three-wheeled cycle called a tricycle - three wheels providing more balance than a standard two-wheeled cycle.

=== Blind/Visually Impaired, also known as Tandem Class Blind ===
Athletes who are blind or visually impaired. They compete using a two-person cycle known as a tandem, with a sighted "pilot" in the front seat. Under UCI rules, a professional cyclist must not be active for 12 months in any UCI professional tour (starting January 1 of the year) or be selected to any national team in a UCI-sanctioned championship, except Masters (over 40), in order to apply as a Para cycling pilot.

This rule is designed to prevent active elite-level cyclists from having an advantage, although developmental cyclists who have yet to participate in a UCI professional tour or retired elite cyclists could participate. For example, Corentin Ermenault, a young French cyclist who has yet to reach the professional ranks, and Adam Duggleby, who is not a professional on the major tours, both served as sighted guides at the 2020 Paralympics. Craig MacLean, who won a silver medal in the Team Sprint at the 2000 Olympic Games in Sydney, retired in 2008 and in 2010 joined the GB Para cycling team as a tandem pilot after sitting out the required two years.

== Process ==
International classification is undertaken by a UCI panel which consists of "a medical doctor, a physiotherapist and a sports technician" who will assess the athlete and assign them a class. The evaluation is done in English, and athletes are allowed to be accompanied by an interpreter and/or a representative of their country's National Federation in the sport. Classified athletes will be issued a Para cycling classification card.

For Australian competitors in this sport, the sport and classification is managed the national sport federation with support from the Australian Paralympic Committee. There are three types of classification available for Australian competitors:

- Provisional - for club level competition
- National - for state and national competition
- International - for international competition

== At the Paralympic Games ==
Competitors with cerebral palsy classifications were allowed to compete at the Paralympics for the first time at the 1984 Summer Paralympics. Cycling appeared for the first time at the 1988 Summer Paralympics. At the 1992 Summer Paralympics, cerebral palsy, amputee and wheelchair disability types were eligible to participate, with classification being run through multiple federations and the International Paralympic Committee, with classification being done based on disability type. At the 1996 Summer Paralympics, on the spot classification required that classifiers have access to medical equipment like Snellen charts, reflex hammers, and goniometers to properly classify competitors. At the 2000 Summer Paralympics, 33 assessments were conducted at the Games. This resulted in 5 class changes. Handcycling classifications were included at the Paralympics for the first time at the 2004 Summer Paralympics. A total of 155 men and 70 women competed at the London 2012 Summer Paralympics. Road cycling competition was held at Brands Hatch, Kent from 5 September to 8 September, while track cycling was held at the Velodrome, Olympic Park from 30 August to 2 September. A maximum of 14 men and 7 women per nation were allowed to compete across the 18 medal events in road cycling and 32 medal events in track cycling.

For the 2016 Summer Paralympics in Rio, the International Paralympic Committee had a zero classification at the Games policy. This policy was put into place in 2014, with the goal of avoiding last minute changes in classes that would negatively impact athlete training preparations. All competitors needed to be internationally classified with their classification status confirmed prior to the Games, with exceptions to this policy being dealt with on a case-by-case basis. In case there was a need for classification or reclassification at the Games despite best efforts otherwise, cycling classification was scheduled for September 5 at the Velodrome and September 4 to September 6 for visually impaired cyclists. For sportspeople with physical or intellectual disabilities going through classification or reclassification in Rio, their in competition observation event is their first appearance in competition at the Games.^{[33]}

== Future ==
As of 2012, disability sport's major classification body, the International Paralympic Committee, is working on improving classification to be more of an evidence-based system as opposed to a performance-based system so as not to punish elite athletes whose performance makes them appear in a higher class alongside competitors who train less.
