= Italy at the 2020 Summer Paralympics =

- Flag of Italy
- IPC code: ITA
- NPC: Italian Paralympic Committee
- Website: Official website

in Tokyo, Japan August 24, 2021 – September 5, 2021
- Competitors: 115 (52 men and 63 women) in 16 sports
- Flag bearers (opening): Bebe Vio and Federico Morlacchi
- Flag bearer (closing): Matteo Parenzan
- Medals Ranked 9th: Gold 14 Silver 29 Bronze 26 Total 69

Summer Paralympics appearances (overview)
- 1960; 1964; 1968; 1972; 1976; 1980; 1984; 1988; 1992; 1996; 2000; 2004; 2008; 2012; 2016; 2020; 2024

Italy competed at the 2020 Summer Paralympics in Tokyo, Japan, from 24 August to 5 September 2021. This was their sixteenth consecutive appearance at the Summer Paralympics since 1960. An analysis by Michelina Manzillo reports that Italy ranked as the top country in the European Union for the number of medals won at the Tokyo Paralympic Games.

== Medalists ==
Medal	Athlete/s	Sport	Event	Date
Gold	Carlotta Gilli	Swimming	100 metre butterfly S13	25 August
Gold	Francesco Bocciardo	Swimming	200 metre freestyle S5	25 August
Gold	Francesco Bocciardo	Swimming	100 metre freestyle S5	26 August
Gold	Stefano Raimondi	Swimming	100 metre breaststroke SB9	26 August
Gold	Beatrice Vio	Wheelchair fencing	Women's foil B	28 August
Gold	Simone Barlaam	Swimming	Men's 50 metre freestyle S9	29 August
Gold	Arjola Trimi	Swimming	Women's 50 metre backstroke S3	29 August
Gold	Vittoria Bianco; Xenia Palazzo; Giulia Terzi; Alessia Scortechini	Swimming	Women's 4 x 100 metre freestyle relay	29 August
Gold	Arjola Trimi	Swimming	Women's 100 metre freestyle S3	30 August
Gold	Carlotta Gilli	Swimming	Women's 200 metre individual medley SM13	30 August
Gold	Giulia Terzi	Swimming	Women's 100 metre freestyle S7	31 August
Gold	Antonio Fantin	Swimming	Men's 100 metre freestyle S6	1 September
Gold	Paolo Cecchetto; Luca Mazzone; Diego Colombari	Cycling	Mixed team relay H1–5	2 September
Gold	Ambra Sabatini	Athletics	Women's 100 metres T63	4 September
Silver	Alessia Berra	Swimming	100 metre butterfly S13	25 August
Silver	Luigi Beggiato	Swimming	100 metre freestyle S4	26 August
Silver	Carlotta Gilli	Swimming	100 metre backstroke S13	26 August
Silver	Giulia Terzi; Arjola Trimi; Luigi Beggiato; Antonio Fantin	Swimming	Mixed 4 x 50 metre freestyle relay	26 August
Silver	Carlotta Gilli	Swimming	400 metre freestyle S13	27 August
Silver	Anna Barbaro; Guide: Charlotte Bonin	Paratriathlon	PTVI	28 August
Silver	Xenia Palazzo	Swimming	200 metre individual medley SM8	28 August
Silver	Giulia Terzi	Swimming	400 metre freestyle S7	29 August
Silver	Giulia Ghiretti	Swimming	100 metre breaststroke SB4	29 August
Silver	Andreea Mogoș; Beatrice Vio; Loredana Trigilia	Wheelchair fencing	Women's foil team	29 August
Silver	Antonio Fantin; Simone Ciulli; Simone Barlaam; Stefano Raimondi	Swimming	Men's 4 x 100 metre freestyle relay	30 August
Silver	Luca Mazzone	Cycling	Men's time trial H2	31 August
Silver	Assunta Legnante	Athletics	Women's discus throw F11	31 August
Silver	Fabrizio Cornegliani	Cycling	Men's road time trial H1	31 August
Silver	Francesca Porcellato	Cycling	Women's road time trial H1–3	31 August
Silver	Giorgio Farroni	Cycling	Men's road time trial T1–2	31 August
Silver	Alberto Amodeo	Swimming	Men's 400 metre freestyle S8	31 August
Silver	Stefano Raimondi	Swimming	Men's 100 metre butterfly S10	31 August
Silver	Luca Mazzone	Cycling	Men's road race H1–2	1 September
Silver	Simone Barlaam	Swimming	Men's 100 metre butterfly S9	2 September
Silver	Antonio Fantin	Swimming	Men's 400 metre freestyle S6	2 September
Silver	Stefano Raimondi	Swimming	Men's 100 metre backstroke S10	2 September
Silver	Vincenza Petrilli	Archery	Women's individual recurve open	2 September
Silver	Arjola Trimi	Swimming	Women's 50 metre freestyle S4	2 September
Silver	Martina Caironi	Athletics	Women's long jump T63	2 September
Silver	Assunta Legnante	Athletics	Women's shot put F12	3 September
Silver	Stefano Raimondi	Swimming	Men's 200 metre individual medley SM10	3 September
Silver	Elisabetta Mijno; Stefano Travisani	Archery	Mixed team recurve open	4 September
Silver	Martina Caironi	Athletics	Women's 100 metres T63	4 September
Bronze	Francesco Bettella	Swimming	100 metre backstroke S1	25 August
Bronze	Monica Boggioni	Swimming	200 metre freestyle S5	25 August
Bronze	Monica Boggioni	Swimming	100 metre freestyle S5	26 August
Bronze	Sara Morganti (Note: Horse Royal Delight.)	Equestrian	Individual championship test grade I	27 August
Bronze	Veronica Yoko Plebani	Paratriathlon	PTS2	28 August
Bronze	Stefano Raimondi	Swimming	100 metre freestyle S10	28 August
Bronze	Giovanni Achenza	Paratriathlon	PTWC	29 August
Bronze	Carlotta Gilli	Swimming	50 metre freestyle S13	29 August
Bronze	Carolina Costa	Judo	Women's +70 kg	29 August
Bronze	Maria Andrea Virgilio	Archery	Women's individual compound open	30 August
Bronze	Andrea Liverani	Shooting	Mixed R4 – 10 m air rifle standing SH2	30 August
Bronze	Oney Tapia	Athletics	Men's shot put F11	30 August
Bronze	Sara Morganti	Equestrian	Individual freestyle test grade I	30 August
Bronze	Xenia Palazzo	Swimming	Women's 400 metre freestyle S8	31 August
Bronze	Michela Brunelli; Giada Rossi	Table tennis	Women's team – Class 1–3	1 September
Bronze	Katia Aere	Cycling	Women's road race H5	1 September
Bronze	Xenia Palazzo	Swimming	Women's 50 metre freestyle S8	1 September
Bronze	Oney Tapia	Athletics	Men's discus throw F11	2 September
Bronze	Francesco Bettella	Swimming	Men's 50 metre backstroke S1	2 September
Bronze	Luigi Beggiato	Swimming	Men's 50 metre freestyle S4	2 September
Bronze	Ndiaga Dieng	Athletics	Men's 1500 metres T20	3 September
Bronze	Federico Mancarella	Paracanoeing	Men's KL2	3 September
Bronze	Giulia Terzi	Swimming	Women's 50 metre butterfly S7	3 September
Bronze	Monica Boggioni	Swimming	Women's 200 metre individual medley SM5	3 September
Bronze	Riccardo Menciotti; Stefano Raimondi; Simone Barlaam; Antonio Fantin; Federico Bicelli (Note: He swam in heats.); Federico Morlacchi	Swimming	Men's 4 x 100 m medley relay	3 September
Bronze	Monica Contrafatto	Athletics	Women's 100 metres T63	4 September

Medals by sport
Sport	1st place, gold medalist(s)	2nd place, silver medalist(s)	3rd place, bronze medalist(s)	Total
Swimming	11	16	12	39
Cycling	1	5	1	7
Athletics	1	4	4	9
Wheelchair fencing	1	1	0	2
Archery	0	2	1	3
Paratriathlon	0	1	2	3
Equestrian	0	0	2	2
Judo	0	0	1	1
Shooting	0	0	1	1
Table tennis	0	0	1	1
Paracanoeing	0	0	1	1
Total	14	29	26	69

Medals by date
Day	Date	1st place, gold medalist(s)	2nd place, silver medalist(s)	3rd place, bronze medalist(s)	Total
1	25 August	2	1	2	5
2	26 August	2	3	1	6
3	27 August	0	1	1	2
4	28 August	1	2	2	5
5	29 August	3	3	3	9
6	30 August	2	1	4	7
7	31 August	1	7	1	9
8	1 September	1	1	3	5
9	2 September	1	6	3	10
10	3 September	0	2	5	7
11	4 September	1	2	1	4
12	5 September	0	0	0	0
Total		14	29	26	69

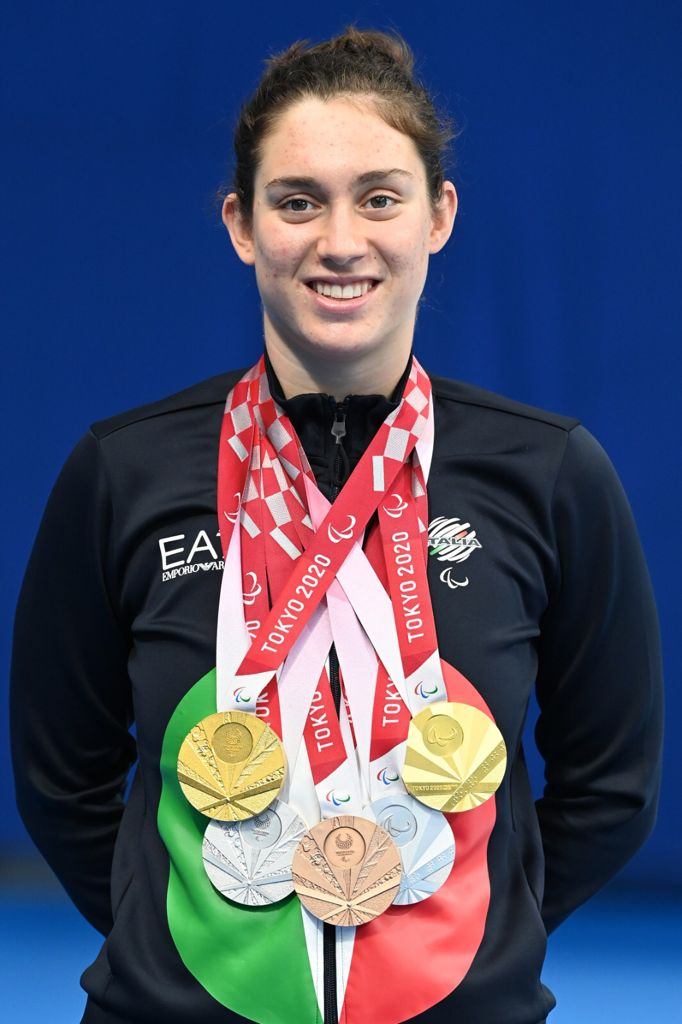
Carlotta Gilli shows her five medals won in Tokyo 2020.

Multiple medalists
Name	Sport	1st place, gold medalist(s)	2nd place, silver medalist(s)	3rd place, bronze medalist(s)	Total
Carlotta Gilli	Swimming	2	2	1	5
Giulia Terzi	Swimming	2	2	1	5
Arjola Trimi	Swimming	2	2	0	4
Francesco Bocciardo	Swimming	2	1	0	3
Stefano Raimondi	Swimming	1	4	2	7
Antonio Fantin	Swimming	1	3	1	5
Simone Barlaam	Swimming	1	2	1	4
Xenia Palazzo	Swimming	1	1	2	4
Luca Mazzone	Cycling	1	2	0	3
Beatrice Vio	Fencing	1	1	0	2
Luigi Beggiato	Swimming	0	2	1	3
Martina Caironi	Athletics	0	2	0	2
Assunta Legnante	Athletics	0	2	0	2
Monica Boggioni	Swimming	0	0	3	3
Francesco Bettella	Swimming	0	0	2	2
Sara Morganti	Equestrian	0	0	2	2
Oney Tapia	Athletics	0	0	2	2

== Archery ==
Italy qualified eight archers.

Men

Athlete	Event	Ranking Round		Round of 32	Round of 16	Quarterfinals	Semifinals	Finals	
Athlete	Event	Score	Seed	Opposition Score	Opposition Score	Opposition Score	Opposition Score	Opposition Score	Rank
Matteo Bonacina	Individual compound	685	16	Miyamoto (JPN); L 136-141	Did not advance				
Giampaolo Cancelli	Individual compound	669	28	Pavlík (SVK); L 139-142	Did not advance				
Stefano Travisani	Individual recurve	609	12	Singh (IND); L 5-6	Did not advance				

Women

Athlete	Event	Ranking Round		Round of 32	Round of 16	Quarterfinals	Semifinals	Finals	
Athlete	Event	Score	Seed	Opposition Score	Opposition Score	Opposition Score	Opposition Score	Opposition Score	Rank
Asia Pellizzari	Individual W1	604	3	—N/a		Rumary (GBR); L 124-130	Did not advance		
Maria Andrea Virgilio	Individual compound	684	5	Bye	Asgari (IRI); W136-135	Sarti (ITA); W138-121	Paterson Pine (GBR); L137-140	Artakhinova (RPC); W142-139	3rd place, bronze medalist(s)
Eleonora Sarti	Individual compound	672	13	Choi (KOR); W140-121	Gögel (BRA); W146-140	Virgilio (ITA); L121-138	Did not advance		
Elisabetta Mijno	Individual recurve	633	2	Bye	Özbey Torun (TUR); W6-0	Poimenidou (GRE); L5-6	Did not advance		
Vincenza Petrilli	Individual recurve	625	4	Bye	Oktrininda (AUS); W 6-0	Chaisty (GBR); W 6-2	Wu (CHN); W 6-5	Wu (CHN); L 5-6	2nd place, silver medalist(s)

Mixed

Athlete	Event	Ranking Round		Round of 16	Quarterfinals	Semifinals	Finals	
Athlete	Event	Score	Seed	Opposition Score	Opposition Score	Opposition Score	Opposition Score	Rank
Maria Andrea Virgilio; Matteo Bonacina	Team compound	1369	7	Nagano/ Miyamoto (JPN); W145-144	Artakhinova/ Shigaev (RPC); L 153-153	Did not advance		
Elisabetta Mijno; Stefano Travisani	Team recurve	1242	3	Selengee/ Mönkhbaatar (MGL); W 6-0	Shigesada/ Ueyama (JPN); W 6-2	Nemati/ Rahimi (IRI); W 5-3	Sidorenko/ Smirnov (RPC); L4-5	2nd place, silver medalist(s)

== Athletics ==
The athletics team is made up of 11 athletes, 6 women and 5 men. To the nine athletes classified by right, the Italy team added two more participation cards a few days before the start of the Games.

Men's track

Athletes	Event	Heats		Final	
Athletes	Event	Result	Rank	Result	Rank
Ndiaga Dieng	400m T20	48.91	4 q	48.42 PB	5
Ndiaga Dieng	1500m T20	Bye		3:57.24	3rd place, bronze medalist(s)
Alessandro Ossola	100m T63	12.77	3 Q	12.66	6

Men's field

Athlete	Event	Final	
Athlete	Event	Result	Rank
Oney Tapia	Discus throw F11	39.52	3rd place, bronze medalist(s)
Oney Tapia	Shot put F11	13.60 PB	3rd place, bronze medalist(s)
Nicky Russo	Shot put F35	12.58	8
Marco Cicchetti	Long jump T44	6.66	6

Women's track

Athlete	Event	Heats		Final	
Athlete	Event	Result	Rank	Result	Rank
Ambra Sabatini	100m T63	14.39 WR, PB	2 Q	14.39 WR, PB	1st place, gold medalist(s)
Martina Caironi	100m T63	14.37 WR, PB	1 Q	14.46	2nd place, silver medalist(s)
Monica Contrafatto	100m T63	14.72 PB	3 Q	14.73	3rd place, bronze medalist(s)
Oxana Corso	100m T35	15.80 SB	3 Q	15.68	8
Oxana Corso	200m T35	—N/a	—N/a	33.13 SB	8

Women's field

Athlete	Event	Final	
Athlete	Event	Result	Rank
Martina Caironi	Long jump T63	5.14	2nd place, silver medalist(s)
Francesca Cipelli	Long jump T37	3.96	9
Assunta Legnante	Discus throw F11	40.25 AR, PB	2nd place, silver medalist(s)
Assunta Legnante	Shot put F12	14.62	2nd place, silver medalist(s)

== Cycling ==
Italy entered a team of 11 road cyclists: 8 men and 3 women.

=== Road ===
Men

Athlete	Event	Class	Time	Rank
Luca Mazzone	Road race	H1-2	1:53:43	2nd place, silver medalist(s)
Fabrizio Cornegliani	Road race	H1-2	DNF	
Paolo Cecchetto	Road race	H3	DNF	
Diego Colombari	Road race	H5	DNF	
Fabio Anobile	Road race	C3	2:11:06	4
Andrea Tarlao	Road race	C5	2:22:35	8
Pierpaolo Addesi	Road race	C5	2:23:53	9
Giorgio Farroni	Road race	T1	55:48	7
Fabrizio Cornegliani	Time trial	H1	45:44.56	2nd place, silver medalist(s)
Luca Mazzone	Time trial	H2	31:23.79	2nd place, silver medalist(s)
Paolo Cecchetto	Time trial	H3	44:03.16	5
Diego Colombari	Time trial	H5	41:21.29	4
Fabio Anobile	Time trial	C3	37:54.37	9
Pierpaolo Addesi	Time trial	C5	48:37.55	9
Andrea Tarlao	Time trial	C5	46:12.99	6
Giorgio Farroni	Time trial	T1	27:49.78	2nd place, silver medalist(s)

Women

Athlete	Event	Class	Time	Rank
Francesca Porcellato	Road race	H1-4	59:45	7
Katia Aere	Road race	H5	2:28:11	3rd place, bronze medalist(s)
Ana Maria Vitelaru	Road race	H5	DNF	
Francesca Porcellato	Time trial	H1-3	33:30.52	2nd place, silver medalist(s)
Katia Aere	Time trial	H4-5	50:40.24	6
Ana Maria Vitelaru	Time trial	H4-5	50:58.69	7

Mixed team

Athlete	Event	Class	Time	Rank
Luca Mazzone; Paolo Cecchetto; Diego Colombari	Road race	Mixed team relay H1-H5	52:32	1st place, gold medalist(s)

== Equestrian ==
Italy fielded a squad of four riders to compete.

Athlete	Horse	Grade	Dressage individual Test		Dressage freestyle Test		Dressage team test	
Athlete	Horse	Grade	Points	Rank	Points	Rank	Points	Rank
Sara Morganti	Royal Delight	Grade I	76.964	3rd place, bronze medalist(s)	81.100	3rd place, bronze medalist(s)	79.286	—N/a
Carola Semperboni	Paul	Grade I	67.678	12	Did not advance		—N/a	
Francesca Salvadé	Oliver-Vitz	Grade III	66.941	16	Did not advance		68.794	—N/a
Francesca Sileoni	Burberry	Grade V	69.048	9	Did not advance		65.977	—N/a
Francesca Sileoni; Sara Morganti; Francesca Salvadé	Burberry; Royal Delight; Oliver-Vitz	Team	—N/a				214.057	8

== Judo ==
Athlete	Event	Round of 16	Quarterfinals	Semifinals	Repechage	Final / BM	
Athlete	Event	Opposition Result	Opposition Result	Opposition Result	Opposition Result	Opposition Result	Rank
Matilde Lauria	Women's 70 kg	Bye	Maldonado (BRA); L 00-10	Bye	Zabrodskaia (RPC); L 00-10	Did not advance	
Carolina Costa	Women's +70 kg	Bye	Katie Davis (USA); W 10-00	Zarina Baibatina (KAZ); L 00-10	Bye	Anastasiia Harnyk (UKR); W 10-00	3rd place, bronze medalist(s)

== Paracanoeing ==
Athlete	Event	Heats		Semifinals		Final	
Athlete	Event	Time	Rank	Time	Rank	Time	Rank
Federico Mancarella	Men's KL2	43.975	3 SF	42.292	1 FA	42.574	3rd place, bronze medalist(s)
Kwadzo Klokpah	Men's KL3	44.217	6 SF	42.398	5 FB	42.854	11
Eleonora De Paolis	Women's KL1	57.659	2 SF	57.484	1 FA	56.226	4
Veronica Biglia	Women's VL2	1:15.671	6 SF	1:09.247	5	Did not advance	

Qualification Legend: SF = Qualify to semifinal; FA = Qualify to final (medal); FB = Qualify to final B (non-medal)

== Paratriathlon ==
Giovanni Achenza, Anna Barbaro, Alberto Buccoliero, Rita Cuccuru and Veronica Yoko Plebani have all qualified to compete.

Athlete	Event	Time	Rank
Giovanni Achenza	Men's PTWC	1:02:05	3rd place, bronze medalist(s)
Pier Alberto Buccoliero	Men's PTWC	1:09:16	9
Rita Cuccuru	Women's PTWC	1:19:06	8
Anna Barbaro; Guide: Charlotte Bonin	Women's PTVI	1:11:11	2nd place, silver medalist(s)
Veronica Yoko Plebani	Women's PTS2	1:15:55	3rd place, bronze medalist(s)

== Powerlifting ==
Athlete	Event	Attempts				Result	Rank
Athlete	Event	1	2	3	4	Result	Rank
Donato Telesca	Men's 80 kg	~~193~~	193	~~199~~	—N/a	193	6

== Rowing ==
Italy qualified two boats in the mixed events for the games. Mixed coxed four crews qualified by winning the bronze and securing the third of available place at the 2019 World Rowing Championships in Ottensheim, Austria. Meanwhile, mixed double sculls crew qualified by winning the gold medal at the 2021 Final Paralympic Qualification Regatta in Gavirate.

Athlete	Event	Heats		Repechage		Final	
Athlete	Event	Time	Rank	Time	Rank	Time	Rank
Gianfilippo Mirabile; Chiara Nardo	Mixed double sculls	9:04.22	3 R	8:20.98	2 FA	9:11.65	5
Cristina Scazzosi; Alessandro Brancato; Lorenzo Bernard; Greta Muti; Lorena Fuina (cox)	Mixed coxed four	7:32.07	3 R	7:08.15	2 FA	7:37.53	5

Qualification Legend: FA=Final A (medal); FB=Final B (non-medal); R=Repechage

== Shooting ==
Italy entered four athletes into the Paralympic competition. Pamela Novaglio successfully break the Paralympic qualification at the 2018 WSPS World Championships which was held in Cheongju, South Korea and two others qualified from 2018 WSPS World Cup which was held in Châteauroux, France. Jacopo Cappelli break the Paralympic qualification at the 2021 World Cup.

Athlete	Event	Qualification		Final	
Athlete	Event	Score	Rank	Score	Rank
Jacopo Cappelli	R1 Men's 10 metre air rifle standing SH1	606.4	16	Did not advance	
Jacopo Cappelli	R3 Mixed 10m air rifle prone SH1	628.9	31	Did not advance	
Jacopo Cappelli	R6 Mixed 50m rifle prone SH1	607.4	40	Did not advance	
Jacopo Cappelli	R7 Men's 50 metre rifle 3 positions SH1	1132-22x	14	Did not advance	
Nadia Fario	P2 Women's 10 m air pistol SH1	545-5x	12	Did not advance	
Nadia Fario	P4 Mixed 50m pistol SH1	509-7x	25	Did not advance	
Andrea Liverani	R4 Mixed 10 m air rifle standing SH2	635.3	3 Q	230.7	3rd place, bronze medalist(s)
Andrea Liverani	R5 Mixed 10m air rifle prone SH2	639.4	8 Q	124.5	8
Andrea Liverani	R9 Mixed 50 m rifle prone SH2	623.3	6 Q	208.0	4
Pamela Novaglio	R4 Mixed 10 m air rifle standing SH2	620.5	26	Did not advance	
Pamela Novaglio	R9 Mixed 50 m rifle prone SH2	620.9	10	Did not advance	

== Sitting volleyball ==
Italy's women's sitting volleyball team qualified for the 2020 Summer Paralympics after winning the 2019 Sitting Volleyball European Championships in Budapest, Hungary in July 2019.

Summary

Team	Event	Group stage				Semifinal	Final / BM / Cl.	
Team	Event	Opposition Score	Opposition Score	Opposition Score	Rank	Opposition Score	Opposition Score	Rank
Italy women's	Women's tournament	Japan; W 3–0	Canada; L 1–3	Brazil; L 1–3	3	Did not advance	RPC; L 1–3	6

=== Women's tournament ===
Group play

Pos	Team	Pld	W	L	Pts	SW	SL	SR	SPW	SPL	SPR	Qualification
1	Brazil	3	3	0	3	9	3	3.000	289	237	1.219	Semifinals
2	Canada	3	2	1	2	8	4	2.000	278	243	1.144	Semifinals
3	Italy	3	1	2	1	5	6	0.833	227	232	0.978	Fifth place match
4	Japan (H)	3	0	3	0	0	9	0.000	143	225	0.636	Seventh place match

Source: TOCOG
(H) Host

27 August 2021; 10:00 v	Japan	0–3	Italy	Makuhari Messe, Tokyo; Referees: Toomas Murulo (EST), Ute Fischer (GER)
27 August 2021; 10:00 v	(23–25, 11–25, 10–25); Results Statistics			Makuhari Messe, Tokyo; Referees: Toomas Murulo (EST), Ute Fischer (GER)

29 August 2021; 14:00 v	Italy	1–3	Canada	Makuhari Messe, Tokyo; Referees: Ute Fischer (GER), Andre Calado (BRA)
29 August 2021; 14:00 v	(16–25, 14–25, 25–15, 18–25); Results Statistics			Makuhari Messe, Tokyo; Referees: Ute Fischer (GER), Andre Calado (BRA)

1 September 2021; 10:00 v	Brazil	3–1	Italy	Makuhari Messe, Tokyo; Referees: Benno Meijer (NED), Krisztina Árpás (HUN)
1 September 2021; 10:00 v	(23–25, 25–17, 25–16, 25–21); Results Statistics			Makuhari Messe, Tokyo; Referees: Benno Meijer (NED), Krisztina Árpás (HUN)

Fifth place match

3 September 2021; 15:30 v	Italy	1–3	RPC	Makuhari Messe, Tokyo; Referees: Dominik Raca (CRO), Khalid Shanishah (LBA)
3 September 2021; 15:30 v	(25–22, 23–25, 23–25, 14–25); Results Statistics			Makuhari Messe, Tokyo; Referees: Dominik Raca (CRO), Khalid Shanishah (LBA)

== Swimming ==
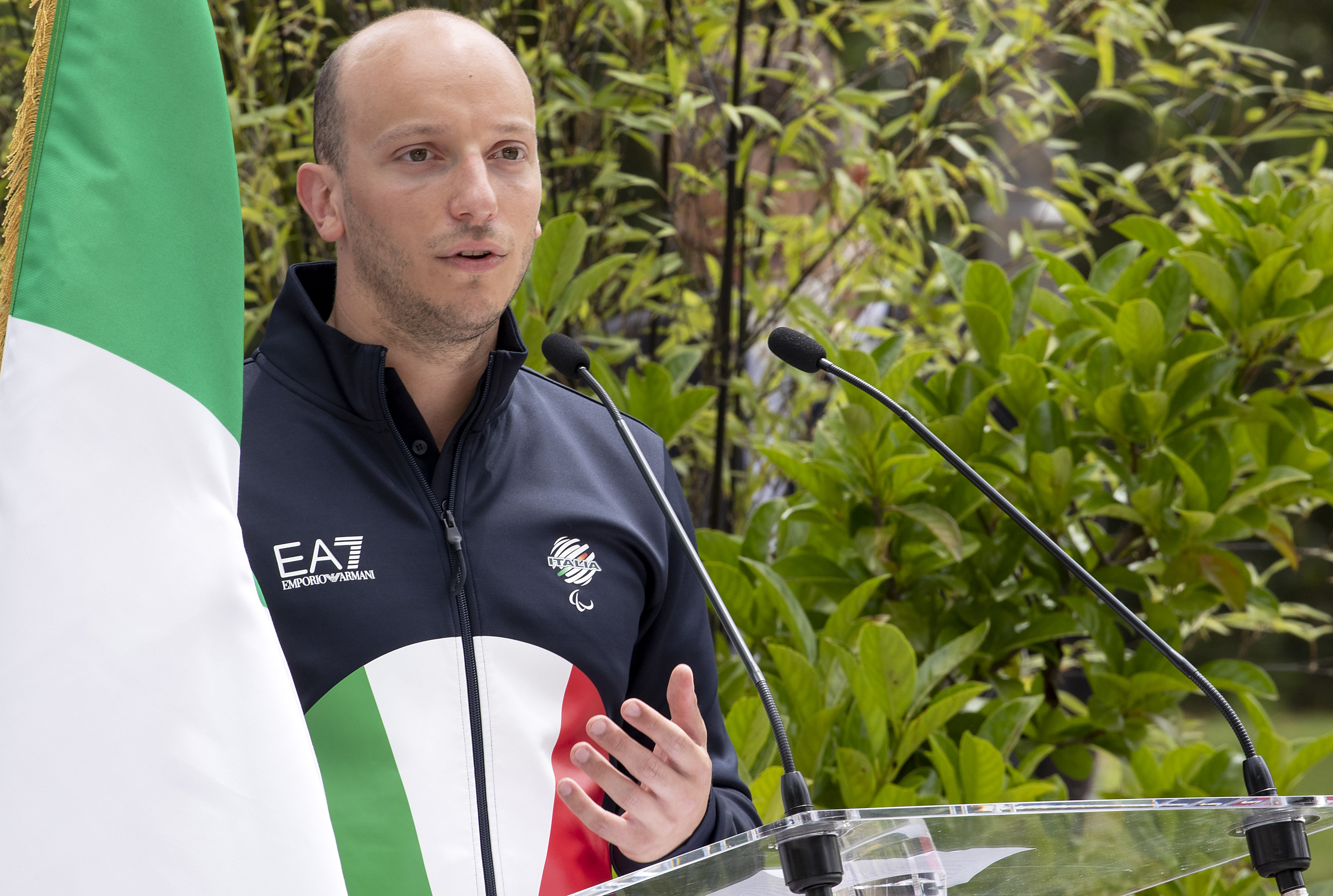
Federico Morlacchi won in Tokyo his 8th Paralympic medal.

Italy qualified 29 swimmers.

Men

Athlete	Event	Heats		Final	
Athlete	Event	Result	Rank	Result	Rank
Alberto Amodeo	100 metre freestyle S8	1:00.08	6 Q	59.93	7
Alberto Amodeo	400 metre freestyle S8	4:39.52	6 Q	4.25.93	2nd place, silver medalist(s)
Alberto Amodeo	100 metre butterfly S8	1:05.323	3 Q	1:04.316	6
Simone Barlaam	50 metre freestyle S9	25.13	1 Q	24.71 =PR	1st place, gold medalist(s)
Simone Barlaam	400 metre freestyle S9	4:17.95	3 Q	4:22.40	6
Simone Barlaam	100 metre backstroke S9	1:04.27	5 Q	1:02.92	5
Simone Barlaam	100 metre butterfly S9	1:00.71	2 Q	59.43	2nd place, silver medalist(s)
Federico Bassani	100 metre breaststroke SB11	1:21.24	7 Q	1:20.57	7
Luigi Beggiato	50 metre freestyle S4	38.76	3 Q	38.12	3rd place, bronze medalist(s)
Luigi Beggiato	100 metre freestyle S4	1:22.93	1 Q	1:23.21	2nd place, silver medalist(s)
Luigi Beggiato	200 metre freestyle S4	3:05.40	4 Q	3:00.85	4
Francesco Bettella	50 metre backstroke S1	1:12.91	3 Q	1.14.87	3rd place, bronze medalist(s)
Francesco Bettella	100 metre backstroke S1	2:32.21	3 Q	2:32.08	3rd place, bronze medalist(s)
Federico Bicelli	50 metre freestyle S7	28.78	7 Q	28.77	8
Federico Bicelli	100 metre freestyle S8	1:01.37	11	Did not advance	
Federico Bicelli	400 metre freestyle S7	4:45.53	2 Q	4:43.67	5
Federico Bicelli	100 metre backstroke S7	1:13.68	5 Q	1:12.25	6
Francesco Bocciardo	50 metre freestyle S5	33.71	6 Q	33.22	7
Francesco Bocciardo	100 metre freestyle S5	1:13.96	5 Q	1:09.56	1st place, gold medalist(s)
Francesco Bocciardo	200 metre freestyle S5	2:35.44	2 Q	2:26.76 PR	1st place, gold medalist(s)
Francesco Bocciardo	100 metre breaststroke SB4	1:51.11	8 Q	1:51.06	8
Vincenzo Boni	50 metre freestyle S3	49.78	7 Q	47.68	7
Vincenzo Boni	100 metre freestyle S4	1:39.56	12	Did not advance	
Vincenzo Boni	200 metre freestyle S3	3:33.79	5 Q	3:32.40	5
Vincenzo Boni	50 metre backstroke S3	48.04	4 Q	47.88	5
Simone Ciulli	50 metre freestyle S9	26.39	9	Did not advance	
Simone Ciulli	100 metre freestyle S10	57.44	14	Did not advance	
Simone Ciulli	100 metre backstroke S9	1:07.41	10	Did not advance	
Simone Ciulli	100 metre butterfly S9	1:03.25	11	Did not advance	
Simone Ciulli	200 metre individual medley SM9	2:29.68	9	Did not advance	
Antonio Fantin	50 metre freestyle S7	29.70	10	Did not advance	
Antonio Fantin	100 metre freestyle S6	1:04.16 PB	1 Q	1:03.71 WR	1st place, gold medalist(s)
Antonio Fantin	400 metre freestyle S6	5:12.08	3 Q	4.55.70	2nd place, silver medalist(s)
Antonio Fantin	100 metre backstroke S6	1:27.90	19	Did not advance	
Emmanuele Marigliano	50 metre freestyle S3	47.68	11	Did not advance	
Emmanuele Marigliano	50 metre backstroke S3	1:03.64	12	Did not advance	
Emmanuele Marigliano	50 metre breaststroke SB2	1:09.01	6 Q	1:08.55	5
Emmanuele Marigliano	Individual medley SM3	3:29.51	7 Q	3:28.43	7
Riccardo Menciotti	50 metre freestyle S10	25.59	11	Did not advance	
Riccardo Menciotti	100 metre freestyle S10	56.29	11	Did not advance	
Riccardo Menciotti	100 metre backstroke S10	1:03.05	6 Q	1.01.46	4
Riccardo Menciotti	100 metre butterfly S10	58.85	6 Q	58.65	7
Riccardo Menciotti	100 metre individual medley SM10	DNS		Did not advance	
Efrem Morelli	50 metre breaststroke SB3	49.35	1 Q	49.42	4
Efrem Morelli	Individual medley SM4	2:50.38	7	2:48.63	7
Federico Morlacchi	400 metre freestyle S9	4:25.33	7 Q	4:24.75	=7
Federico Morlacchi	100 metre breaststroke SB8	1:13.24	9	Did not advance	
Federico Morlacchi	100 metre butterfly S9	1:01.42	4 Q	1:00.75	4
Federico Morlacchi	200 metre individual medley SM9	DSQ		Did not advance	
Misha Palazzo	200 metre freestyle S14	1:58.63	9	Did not advance	
Misha Palazzo	100 metre breaststroke SB14	1:12.19	13	Did not advance	
Misha Palazzo	200 metre individual medley SM14	2:19.95	15	Did not advance	
Stefano Raimondi	50 metre freestyle S10	23.89	4 Q	23.74	4
Stefano Raimondi	100 metre freestyle S10	52.39	3 Q	51.45	3rd place, bronze medalist(s)
Stefano Raimondi	400 metre freestyle S10	4:26.82	8 Q	4:07.38	4
Stefano Raimondi	100 metre backstroke S10	1:01.58	2 Q	59.36	2nd place, silver medalist(s)
Stefano Raimondi	100 metre breaststroke SB9	1:05.58	1 Q	1:05.35	1st place, gold medalist(s)
Stefano Raimondi	100 metre butterfly S10	58.19	2 Q	55.04	2nd place, silver medalist(s)
Stefano Raimondi	200 metre individual medley SM10	2:16.65	2 Q	2:07.68	2nd place, silver medalist(s)
Antonio Fantin (S6); Simone Ciulli (S9); Simone Barlaam (S9); Stefano Raimondi (S10)	4x100 metre freestyle relay 34 pts	—N/a	—N/a	3:45.89 ER	2nd place, silver medalist(s)

Women

Athlete	Event	Heats		Final	
Athlete	Event	Result	Rank	Result	Rank
Alessia Berra	100 metre freestyle S12	1:04.29	6 Q	1:00.68	4
Alessia Berra	100 metre backstroke S12	1:14.19	6 Q	1:14.33	5
Alessia Berra	100 metre butterfly S13	1:07.42	6 Q	1:05.67	2nd place, silver medalist(s)
Vittoria Bianco	100 metre freestyle S9	1:07.32	14	Did not advance	
Vittoria Bianco	400 metre freestyle S9	4:57.51	9	Did not advance	
Monica Boggioni	100 metre freestyle S5	1:22.62	2 Q	1:22.43	3rd place, bronze medalist(s)
Monica Boggioni	200 metre freestyle S5	2:53.67	2 Q	2:55.70	3rd place, bronze medalist(s)
Monica Boggioni	50 metre backstroke S5	46.10	5 Q	45.46	5
Monica Boggioni	100 metre breaststroke SB4	1:55.69	6 Q	1:58.28	6
Monica Boggioni	200 metre individual medley SM5	3:35.94	2 Q	3:39.50	3rd place, bronze medalist(s)
Giulia Ghiretti	100 metre breaststroke SB4	1:52.67	4 Q	1:50.36	2nd place, silver medalist(s)
Giulia Ghiretti	50 metre butterfly S5	47.88	8 Q	46.66	8
Giulia Ghiretti	200 metre individual medley SM5	3:37.93	3 Q	3:40.88	4
Carlotta Gilli	50 metre freestyle S13	27.32	3 Q	27.07	3rd place, bronze medalist(s)
Carlotta Gilli	400 metre freestyle S13	4:38.69	1 Q	4:26.14	2nd place, silver medalist(s)
Carlotta Gilli	100 metre backstroke S13	1:08.00	3 Q	1:06.10	2nd place, silver medalist(s)
Carlotta Gilli	100 metre breaststroke SB13	1:22.73	9	Did not advance	
Carlotta Gilli	100 metre butterfly S13	1:04.16	1 Q	1:02.65	1st place, gold medalist(s)
Carlotta Gilli	200 metre individual medley SM13	2:26.52	1 Q	2:21.44 WR	1st place, gold medalist(s)
Giorgia Marchi	100 metre breaststroke	1:26.44	12	Did not advance	
Xenia Palazzo	50 metre freestyle S8	31.57	3 Q	31.17	3rd place, bronze medalist(s)
Xenia Palazzo	400 metre freestyle S8	4:51.21	3 Q	4:56.79	3rd place, bronze medalist(s)
Xenia Palazzo	100 metre backstroke S8	1:20.32	5 Q	1:20.90	4
Xenia Palazzo	200 metre individual medley SM8	2:55.64	3 Q	2:47.86	2nd place, silver medalist(s)
Angela Procida	100 metre freestyle S3	2:42.37	12	Did not advance	
Angela Procida	50 metre backstroke S2	1:14.16	5 Q	1:12.69	5
Angela Procida	100 metre backstroke S2	2:40.54	4 Q	2:43.58	6
Martina Rabbolini	400 metre freestyle S11	5:47.78	8 Q	5:47.25	8
Martina Rabbolini	100 metre backstroke S11	1:23.37	8 Q	1:24.34	8
Martina Rabbolini	100 metre breaststroke SB11	1:33.02	8 Q	1:34.29	8
Martina Rabbolini	200 metre individual medley SM11	3:02.85	8 Q	3:03:07	8
Alessia Scortechini	50 metre freestyle S10	28.55	5 Q	28.26	4
Alessia Scortechini	100 metre freestyle S10	1:02.31	8 Q	1:02.97	8
Alessia Scortechini	100 metre butterfly S10	1:07.46	3 Q	1:08.62	4
Arianna Talamona	50 metre freestyle S6	38.89	14	Did not advance	
Arianna Talamona	100 metre breaststroke SB5	1:44.60	3 Q	1:43.83	5
Giulia Terzi	100 metre freestyle S7	1:11.70	2 Q	1:09.21 ER	1st place, gold medalist(s)
Giulia Terzi	400 metre freestyle S7	5:05.80	2 Q	5:06.32	2nd place, silver medalist(s)
Giulia Terzi	50 metre butterfly S7	35.40	3 Q	34.32	3rd place, bronze medalist(s)
Arjola Trimi	50 metre freestyle S4	42.88	3 Q	40.32	2nd place, silver medalist(s)
Arjola Trimi	100 metre freestyle S3	1:45.41	2 Q	1:30.22 ER	1st place, gold medalist(s)
Arjola Trimi	50 metre backstroke S3	54.79	1 Q	51.34	1st place, gold medalist(s)
Vittoria Bianco; Xenia Palazzo; Giulia Terzi; Alessia Scortechini	4x100 m freestyle relay 34 pts	4:26.39	2 Q	4:24.85	1st place, gold medalist(s)

Mixed

Athlete	Event	Heats		Final	
Athlete	Event	Result	Rank	Result	Rank
Francesco Bocciardo; Antonio Fantin; Arianna Talamona; Giulia Terzi; Arjola Trimi	4 x 50 metre freestyle relay 20pts	2:25.48	1 Q	2:21.45	2nd place, silver medalist(s)

== Table tennis ==
Italy entered seven players into the Games. Giada Rossi qualified from the 2019 ITTF European Para Championships which was held in Helsingborg, Sweden and other four athletes qualified via World Ranking allocation.

Men

Athlete	Event	Group Stage				Round 1	Quarterfinals	Semifinals	Final	
Athlete	Event	Opposition Result	Opposition Result	Opposition Result	Rank	Opposition Result	Opposition Result	Opposition Result	Opposition Result	Rank
Andrea Borgato	Individual C1	Major (HUN); L 1-3	Godfrey (USA); W 3-1	—N/a	2 Q	—N/a	Matthews (GBR); L 1-3	Did not advance		
Federico Falco	Individual C1	Joo (KOR); L 0-3	Eberhardt (ARG); W 3-2	—N/a	2 Q	—N/a	Kim (KOR); L 0-3	Did not advance		
Matteo Orsi	Individual C3	Feng (CHN); L 0-3	Nalepka (POL); L 1-3	—N/a	3	Did not advance				
Matteo Parenzan	Individual C6	Rosenmeier (DEN); L 0-3	Seidenfeld (USA); L 0-3	—N/a	3	Did not advance				
Mohamed Amine Kalem	Individual C9	Chee (MAS); W 3-0	Ma Lin (AUS); L 0-3	Stacey (GBR); L 2-3	3	Did not advance				
Andrea Borgato; Federico Falco	Team C1-C2	—N/a					Slovakia; L 0-2	Did not advance		
Matteo Parenzan; Mohamed Amine Kalem	Team C9-C10	—N/a					Ukraine; L 0-2	Did not advance		

Women

Athlete	Event	Group Stage				Round 1	Quarterfinals	Semifinals	Final	
Athlete	Event	Opposition Result	Opposition Result	Opposition Result	Rank	Opposition Result	Opposition Result	Opposition Result	Opposition Result	Rank
Giada Rossi	Individual C1-2	Garrone (ARG); W 3-1	Lafaye (FRA); W 3-0	—N/a	1 Q	—N/a	Cátia Oliveira; Brazil; L 0-3	Did not advance		
Michela Brunelli	Individual C3	Mužinić (CRO); L 1-3	Soledad (ARG); W 3-0	Sigala (MEX); W 3-0	2 Q	—N/a	Lee Mi-gyu (KOR); L 0-3	Did not advance		
Giada Rossi; Michela Brunelli	Team C1-C3	—N/a					Thailand; W 2-1	China; L 1-2	—N/a	3rd place, bronze medalist(s)

== Taekwondo ==
Italy qualified one athletes to compete at the Paralympics competition. Antonino Bossolo qualified by entered top six in the world ranking.

Athlete	Event	First round	Quarterfinals	Semifinals	Repechage	Final/BM	
Athlete	Event	Opposition Result	Opposition Result	Opposition Result	Opposition Result	Opposition Result	Rank
Antonino Bossolo	Men's –61kg	Zukhriddin Tokhirov (UZB); W 64-30	Ganbatyn Bolor-Erdene (MGL); W 40-28	Nathan Torquato (BRA); L 34-37	—N/a	Mahmut Bozteke (TUR); L 2-14	5

== Wheelchair fencing ==
Men

Athlete	Event		Pools	Round of 16	Quarterfinal	Semifinal	Final / BM	
Athlete	Event		Rank	Opposition Score	Opposition Score	Opposition Score	Opposition Score	Rank
Edoardo Giordan	Men's épée	Category A	9 Q	Manko (UKR); L 8-15	Did not advance			
Emanuele Lambertini	Men's épée	Category A	6 Q	Bye	Tian (CHN); L 14-15	Did not advance		
Edoardo Giordan; Matteo Betti; Emanuele Lambertini; Matteo Cima	Men's épée	Team	8	Did not advance				
Matteo Betti	Men's foil	Category A	5 Q	Bye	Nalewajek (POL); W 15-12	Sun (CHN); L 6-15	Nagaev (RPC); L 11-15	4
Emanuele Lambertini	Men's foil	Category A	11 Q	Li (CHN); W 15-14	Osvath (HUN); L 14-15	Did not advance		
Marco Cima	Men's foil	Category B	8 Q	Kuzyukov (RPC); L 11-15	Did not advance			
Matteo Betti; Emanuele Lambertini; Marco Cima	Men's foil	Team	5	Did not advance				
Edoardo Giordan	Men's sabre	Category A	2 Q	Bye	Demchuk (UKR); L 11-15	Did not advance		

Women

Athlete	Event		Pools	Round of 16	Quarterfinal	Semifinal	Final / BM	
Athlete	Event		Rank	Opposition Score	Opposition Score	Opposition Score	Opposition Score	Rank
Rossana Pasquino	Women's épée	Category B	10 Q	Fedota (UKR); L 9-15	Did not advance			
Ionela Andreea Mogos	Women's foil	Category A	7 Q	Mandryk (UKR); W 15-11	Morkvych (UKR); L 5-15	Did not advance		
Loredana Trigilia	Women's foil	Category A	8 Q	Sycheva (RPC); L 7-15	Did not advance			
Beatrice Maria Vio	Women's foil	Category B	1 Q	Bye	Khetsuriani (GEO); W 15-6	Vasileva (RPC); W 15-4	Zhou (CHN); W 15-9	1st place, gold medalist(s)
Ionela Andreea Mogos; Loredana Trigilia; Beatrice Maria Vio	Women's foil	Team	1 Q	—N/a	—N/a	HungaryW45-27	ChinaL41-45	2nd place, silver medalist(s)
Ionela Andeea Mogos	Women's sabre	Category A	12	Did not advance				
Loredana Trigilia	Women's sabre	Category A	10 Q	Tibilashvili (GEO); L 9-15	Did not advance			
Rossana Pasquino	Women's sabre	Category B	3 Q	Bye	Khetsuriani (GEO); W 14-15	Did not advance		

== See also ==
- Italy at the Paralympics
- Italy at the 2020 Summer Olympics
