= Cycling at the 2020 Summer Paralympics – Men's road race =

The men's road race cycling events at the 2020 Summer Paralympics took place from September 1 to 3 at Fuji Speedway, Oyama. Eight events took place, spanning over twelve classifications.

== Classification ==
Cyclists are given a classification depending on the type and extent of their disability. The classification system allows cyclists to compete against others with a similar level of function. The class number indicates the severity of impairment with "1" being most impaired.

Cycling classes are:

- B: Blind and visually impaired cyclists use a Tandem bicycle with a sighted pilot on the front
- H 1–4: Cyclists with an impairment that affects their legs use a handcycle
- T 1–2: Cyclists with an impairment that affects their balance use a tricycle
- C 1-5: Cyclists with an impairment that affects their legs, arms, and/or trunk but are capable of using a standard bicycle

== Schedule ==
F	Finals

Men's Road Race
Event↓/Date →	1 September	2 September	3 September
B			F
H1-2	F		
H3	F		
H4	F		
H5	F		
C1-3		F	
C4-5			F
T1-2		F	

== Medal table ==
Rank	NPC	Gold	Silver	Bronze	Total
1	Netherlands	3	1	2	6
2	France	2	1	2	5
3	Great Britain	1	1	0	2
4	China	1	0	0	1
4	RPC	1	0	0	1
6	Austria	0	1	2	3
7	Belgium	0	1	0	1
7	Italy	0	1	0	1
7	Switzerland	0	1	0	1
7	Ukraine	0	1	0	1
11	Colombia	0	0	1	1
11	Spain	0	0	1	1
Totals (12 entries)		8	8	8	24

== Medal summary ==
Classification	Gold		Silver		Bronze	
B	Netherlands; Vincent ter Schure; Guide: Timo Fransen	2:59:13	Netherlands; Tristan Bangma; Guide: Patrick Bos	3:05:01	France; Alexandre Lloveras; Guide: Corentin Ermenault	3:06:14
H1-2	Florian Jouanny; France	1:49:36	Luca Mazzone; Italy	1:53:43	Sergio Garrote Munoz; Spain	1:54:36
H3	Ruslan Kuznetsov; RPC	2:34:35	Heinz Frei; Switzerland	2:34:35	Walter Ablinger; Austria	2:35:06
H4	Jetze Plat; Netherlands	2:15:13	Thomas Frühwirth; Austria	2:20:56	Alexander Gritsch; Austria	2:22:38
H5	Mitch Valize; Netherlands	2:24:30	Loïc Vergnaud; France	2:24:30	Tim de Vries; Netherlands	2:24:40
C1–3	Benjamin Watson; Great Britain	2:04:23	Finlay Graham; Great Britain	2:05:43	Alexandre Léauté; France	2:11:06
C4–5	Kévin Le Cunff; France	2:14:49	Yegor Dementyev; Ukraine	2:15:11	Daniel Abraham; Netherlands	2:15:20
T1–2	Chen Jianxin; China	51:07	Tim Celen; Belgium	52:15	Juan José Betancourt Quiroga; Colombia	52:41
