= Cycling at the 2020 Summer Paralympics – Men's road time trial H5 =

Men's road time trial H5 at the XVI Paralympic Games
- Venue: Fuji Speedway
- Dates: 31 August
- Competitors: 9 from 8 nations
- Winning time: 38:12.94

Medalists
1st place, gold medalist(s)		Mitch Valize	Netherlands
2nd place, silver medalist(s)		Loïc Vergnaud	France
3rd place, bronze medalist(s)		Gary O'Reilly	Ireland

The men's time trial H5 road cycling event at the 2020 Summer Paralympics took place on 31 August 2021, at Fuji Speedway, Tokyo. 9 riders competed in the event.

The H5 classification is for athletes who can kneel on a handcycle, a category that includes paraplegics and amputees. These riders operate a hand-operated cycle.

== Results ==
The event took place on 31 August 2021, at 9:13:

Rank	Rider	Nationality	Time	Deficit
1st place, gold medalist(s)	Mitch Valize	Netherlands	38:12.94	
2nd place, silver medalist(s)	Loïc Vergnaud	France	39:15.16	+1:02.22
3rd place, bronze medalist(s)	Gary O'Reilly	Ireland	39:36.46	+1:23.52
4	Diego Colombari	Italy	41:21.29	+3:08.35
5	Tim de Vries	Netherlands	41:33.46	+3:20.52
6	Alfredo de los Santos	United States	41:37.77	+3:24.83
7	Luís Costa	Portugal	42:42.18	+4:29.24
8	Stuart Tripp	Australia	42:56.88	+4:43.94
9	Ernst van Dyk	South Africa	44:34.88	+6:21.94
