= Cycling at the 2020 Summer Paralympics – Men's road time trial =

The men's road time trial cycling events at the 2020 Summer Paralympics will take place on August 31 at Fuji Speedway, Oyama, Japan. Twelve events will take place over twelve classifications. The T1-2 time trial, which takes in two classifications, was a 'factored' event, with times adjusted by classification to allow fair competition. All events (finals) are to be held on the same day (August 31).

== Classification ==
Cyclists are given a classification depending on the type and extent of their disability. The classification system allows cyclists to compete against others with a similar level of function. The class number indicates the severity of impairment with "1" being most impaired.

Cycling classes are:

- B: Blind and visually impaired cyclists use a Tandem bicycle with a sighted pilot on the front
- H 1–5: Cyclists with an impairment that affects their legs use a handcycle
- T 1–2: Cyclists with an impairment that affects their balance use a tricycle
- C 1–5: Cyclists with an impairment that affects their legs, arms, and/or trunk but are capable of using a standard bicycle

== Medal table ==
Rank	NPC	Gold	Silver	Bronze	Total
1	Netherlands	3	1	0	4
2	France	1	1	2	4
3	Austria	1	1	1	3
4	Slovakia	1	1	0	2
5	Spain	1	0	2	3
6	Australia	1	0	1	2
6	Great Britain	1	0	1	2
8	China	1	0	0	1
8	RPC	1	0	0	1
8	South Africa	1	0	0	1
11	Italy	0	3	0	3
12	Germany	0	2	2	4
13	Belgium	0	1	2	3
14	Ukraine	0	1	0	1
14	United States	0	1	0	1
16	Ireland	0	0	1	1
Totals (16 entries)		12	12	12	36

== Medal summary ==
Classification	Gold		Silver		Bronze	
B	Alexandre Lloveras; Guide: Corentin Ermenault; France	41:54.02	Vincent ter Schure; Guide: Timo Fransen; Netherlands	42:00.77	Christian Venge Balboa; Guide: Noel Martín Infante; Spain	42:52.12
H1	Pieter du Preez; South Africa	43:49.41	Fabrizio Cornegliani; Italy	45:44.56	Maxime Hordies; Belgium	47:01.23
H2	Sergio Garrote Muñoz; Spain	31:23.53	Luca Mazzone; Italy	31:23.79	Florian Jouanny; France	32:41.62
H3	Walter Ablinger; Austria	43:39.17	Vico Merklein; Germany	43:41.06	Luis Miguel García-Marquina; Spain	43:48.68
H4	Jetze Plat; Netherlands	37:28.92	Thomas Fruehwirth; Austria	38:30.61	Alexander Gritsch; Austria	39:58.93
H5	Mitch Valize; Netherlands	38:12.94	Loïc Vergnaud; France	39:15.16	Gary O'Reilly; Ireland	39:36.46
C1	Mikhail Astashov; RPC	24:53.37	Aaron Keith; United States	24:55.40	Michael Teuber; Germany	24:58.67
C2	Darren Hicks; Australia	34:39.78	Ewoud Vromant; Belgium	36:11.79	Alexandre Léauté; France	37:07.16
C3	Benjamin Watson; Great Britain	35:00.82	Steffen Warias; Germany	35:57.41	Matthias Schindler; Germany	36:17.95
C4	Patrik Kuril; Slovakia	45:47.10	Jozef Metelka; Slovakia	46:05.05	George Peasgood; Great Britain	46:08.93
C5	Daniel Abraham; Netherlands	42:46.45	Yegor Dementyev; Ukraine	43:19.11	Alistair Donohoe; Australia	43:36.80
T1-2	Chen Jianxin; China	25:00.32	Giorgio Farroni; Italy	27:49.78	Tim Celen; Belgium	30:44.21
