= Cycling at the 2020 Summer Paralympics – Men's road race H5 =

Men's road race H5 at the XVI Paralympic Games
- Venue: Fuji Speedway
- Dates: 1 September
- Competitors: 8 from 9 nations
- Winning time: 2:24:30

Medalists
1st place, gold medalist(s)		Mitch Valize	Netherlands
2nd place, silver medalist(s)		Loic Vergnaud	France
3rd place, bronze medalist(s)		Tim de Vries	Netherlands

The men's road race H5 cycling event at the 2020 Summer Paralympics took place on 1 September 2021, at the Fuji Speedway in Tokyo. Eight riders competed in the event.

The H5 classification is for athletes who can kneel on a handcycle, a category that includes paraplegics and amputees. These riders operated using a hand-operated cycle.

== Results ==
The event took place on 1 September 2021, at 9:30:

Rank	Rider	Nationality	Time	Deficit
1st place, gold medalist(s)	Mitch Valize	Netherlands	2:24:30	
2nd place, silver medalist(s)	Loic Vergnaud	France	2:24:30	+0.00
3rd place, bronze medalist(s)	Tim de Vries	Netherlands	2:24:40	+0.10
4	Gary O'Reilly	Ireland	2:24:57	+0.27
5	Alfredo de los Santos	United States	2:24:57	+0.27
6	Luis Costa	Portugal	2:25:06	+0.36
7	Stuart Tripp	Australia	2:36:23	+11:53
8	Ernst van Dyk	South Africa	2:36:23	+11:53
	Diego Colombari	Italy	DNF	
