= Cycling at the 2024 Summer Paralympics – Men's road race H5 =

Men's road race H5 at the XVII Paralympic Games
- Venue: Clichy-sous-Bois
- Dates: 5 September
- Competitors: 7 from 6 nations
- Winning time: 1:33:12

Medalists
1st place, gold medalist(s)		Mitch Valize	Netherlands
2nd place, silver medalist(s)		Loïc Vergnaud	France
3rd place, bronze medalist(s)		Pavlo Bal	Ukraine

The men's road race H5 cycling event at the 2024 Summer Paralympics took place on 5 September 2024 in Clichy-sous-Bois in Seine-Saint-Denis, Paris, France. 7 riders competed in the event.

== Schedule ==
F	Finals

Men's Road Race
Event↓/Date →	5 September	6 September	7 September
B		F	
H1-2	F		
H3	F		
H4	F		
H5	F		
C1-3			F
C4-5		F	
T1-2			F

== Results ==
Rank	Rider	Nationality	Class	Time	Gap	Notes
1st place, gold medalist(s)	Mitch Valize	Netherlands	(H5)	1:33:12		
2nd place, silver medalist(s)	Loic Vergnaud	France	(H5)	1:34:27	+1:15	
3rd place, bronze medalist(s)	Pavlo Bal	Ukraine	(H5)	1:37:03	+3:51	
4	Luis Costa	Portugal	(H5)	1:37:16	+4:04	
5	Tim de Vries	Netherlands	(H5)	1:39:25	+6:13	
6	Atachai Sriwichai	Thailand	(H5)	1:40:25	+7:13	
	Lui Qiangli	China	(H5)	DNF		
