= Cycling at the 2020 Summer Paralympics – Mixed team relay H1–5 =

Mixed team relay H1–5 at the XVI Paralympic Games
- Paralympic Cycling
- Venues: Fuji Speedway
- Date: 2 September 2021
- Competitors: 30 from 10 nations
- Winning time: 52:32

Medalists
1st place, gold medalist(s)		Paolo Cecchetto; Luca Mazzone; Diego Colombari	Italy
2nd place, silver medalist(s)		Riadh Tarsim; Florian Jouanny; Loïc Vergnaud	France
3rd place, bronze medalist(s)		Ryan Pinney; Alicia Dana; Alfredo de los Santos	United States

The mixed team relay H1-5 road cycling event at the 2020 Summer Paralympics took place on 2 September 2021, at Fuji Speedway, Tokyo. 30 riders, 3 riders per team, competed in this event.

The H category is for cyclists with lower limb impairment which will involve the use to handcycle. This is the first time the Paralympics will feature in all H category classification (H1-5) to the mixed team relay.

== Results ==
The event took place on 2 September 2021, at 15:30 :

Rank	Nationality	Cyclists	Class	Gender	Time	Deficit
1st place, gold medalist(s)	Italy	Paolo Cecchetto	H3	M	52:32	
1st place, gold medalist(s)	Italy	Luca Mazzone	H2	M	52:32	
1st place, gold medalist(s)	Italy	Diego Colombari	H5	M	52:32	
2nd place, silver medalist(s)	France	Riadh Tarsim	H3	M	53:03	+0.31
2nd place, silver medalist(s)	France	Florian Jouanny	H2	M	53:03	+0.31
2nd place, silver medalist(s)	France	Loïc Vergnaud	H5	M	53:03	+0.31
3rd place, bronze medalist(s)	United States	Ryan Pinney	H3	M	53:11	+0.39
3rd place, bronze medalist(s)	United States	Alicia Dana	H3	F	53:11	+0.39
3rd place, bronze medalist(s)	United States	Alfredo de los Santos	H5	M	53:11	+0.39
4	Germany	Bernd Jeffré	H4	M	53:55	+1:23
4	Germany	Annika Zeyen	H3	F	53:55	+1:23
4	Germany	Vico Merklein	H3	M	53:55	+1:23
5	Spain	Israel Rider Ibáñez	H3	M	54:14	+1:42
5	Spain	Sergio Garrote Muñoz	H2	M	54:14	+1:42
5	Spain	Luis Miguel García-Marquina	H3	M	54:14	+1:42
6	Poland	Rafal Szumiec	H3	M	55:15	+2:43
6	Poland	Renata Kałuża	H3	F	55:15	+2:43
6	Poland	Rafał Wilk	H4	M	55:15	+2:43
7	Switzerland	Fabian Recher	H4	M	55:53	+3:21
7	Switzerland	Tobias Fankhauser	H2	M	55:53	+3:21
7	Switzerland	Heinz Frei	H3	M	55:53	+3:21
8	Belgium	Jonas van de Steene	H4	M	57:08	+4:36
8	Belgium	Laurence VandeVyver	H3	F	57:08	+4:36
8	Belgium	Jean-François Deberg	H3	M	57:08	+4:36
9	Austria	Thomas Frühwirth	H4	M	-3 LAP	
9	Austria	Walter Ablinger	H3	M	-3 LAP	
9	Austria	Elisabeth Egger	H3	F	-3 LAP	
10	South Korea	Yoon Yeo-keun	H4	M	-4 LAP	
10	South Korea	Lee Do-yeon	H4	F	-4 LAP	
10	South Korea	Lee Gyeong-hwa	H3	F	-4 LAP	
