= Cycling at the 2020 Summer Paralympics – Men's road race H3 =

Men's road race H3 at the XVI Paralympic Games
- Venue: Fuji Speedway
- Dates: 1 September 2021
- Competitors: 16 from 13 nations
- Winning time: 2:34:35

Medalists
1st place, gold medalist(s)		Ruslan Kuznetsov	RPC
2nd place, silver medalist(s)		Heinz Frei	Switzerland
3rd place, bronze medalist(s)		Walter Ablinger	Austria

The men's road race H3 cycling event at the 2020 Summer Paralympics took place on 1 September 2021 at Fuji Speedway in Shizuoka Prefecture. 16 riders competed in the event.

The H3 classification is paraplegics with impairments from T4 thru T10. These riders will operate using a hand-operated cycle.

== Results ==
The event took place on 1 September 2021 at 14:20.

Rank	Rider	Nationality	Time	Deficit
1st place, gold medalist(s)	Ruslan Kuznetsov	RPC	2:34:35	
2nd place, silver medalist(s)	Heinz Frei	Switzerland	2:34:35	+0:00
3rd place, bronze medalist(s)	Walter Ablinger	Austria	2:35:06	+0:31
4	Ryan Pinney	United States	2:39:59	+5:24
5	Jean-François Deberg	Belgium	2:41:33	+6:58
6	Rafał Szumiec	Poland	2:44:32	+9:57
7	Riadh Tarsim	France	2:48:04	+13:29
8	Joey Desjardins	Canada	s.t.	
9	Anej Doplihar	Slovenia	s.t.	
10	Charles Moreau	Canada	2:59:47	+25:12
11	Alex Hyndman	Canada	3:00:50	+26:15
12	Tomáš Mošnička	Czech Republic	3:04:08	+29:33
	Vico Merklein	Germany	Did not finish	
	Luis Miguel García-Marquina	Spain	Did not finish	
	Israel Rider	Spain	Did not finish	
	Paolo Cecchetto	Italy	Did not finish	

s.t. Same time
