= Cycling at the 2020 Summer Paralympics – Men's road time trial H3 =

Men's road time trial H3 at the XVI Paralympic Games
- Venue: Fuji Speedway
- Dates: 31 August
- Competitors: 16 from 13 nations
- Winning time: 43:39.17

Medalists
1st place, gold medalist(s)		Walter Ablinger	Austria
2nd place, silver medalist(s)		Vico Merklein	Germany
3rd place, bronze medalist(s)		Luis Miguel García-Marquina	Spain

The men's time trial H3 road cycling event at the 2020 Summer Paralympics took place on 31 August 2021, at Fuji Speedway, Tokyo. 16 riders competed in the event.

The H3 classification is for paraplegics with impairment from T4 thru T10. These riders operate a hand-operated cycle.

== Results ==
The event took place on 31 August 2021, at 9:40:

Rank	Rider	Nationality	Time	Deficit
1st place, gold medalist(s)	Walter Ablinger	Austria	43:39.17	
2nd place, silver medalist(s)	Vico Merklein	Germany	43:41.06	+1.89
3rd place, bronze medalist(s)	Luis Miguel García-Marquina	Spain	43:48.68	+9.51
4	Ruslan Kuznetsov	RPC	43:49.24	+10.07
5	Paolo Cecchetto	Italy	44:03.16	+23.99
6	Ryan Pinney	United States	44:41.34	+1:02.17
7	Heinz Frei	Switzerland	44:48.44	+1:09.27
8	Jean-François Deberg	Belgium	45:14.66	+1:35.49
9	Rafal Szumiec	Poland	45:26.77	+1:47.60
10	Riadh Tarsim	France	45:28.05	+1:48.88
11	Joey Desjardins	Canada	46:13.88	+2:34.71
12	Alex Hyndman	Canada	47:00.95	+3:21.78
13	Anej Doplihar	Slovenia	47:23.84	+3:44.67
14	Israel Rider Ibáñez	Spain	47:52.51	+4:13.34
15	Tomáš Mošnička	Czech Republic	49:33.46	+5:54.29
16	Charles Moreau	Canada	51:35.43	+7:56.26
