= Swimming at the 2020 Summer Paralympics – Men's 200 metre individual medley SM9 =

Men's 200 metre individual medley SM9 at the XVI Paralympic Games
- Venue: Tokyo Aquatics Centre
- Dates: 1 September 2021
- Competitors: 14 from 12 nations

Medalists
1st place, gold medalist(s)		Andrei Kalina	RPC
2nd place, silver medalist(s)		Timothy Hodge	Australia
3rd place, bronze medalist(s)		Ugo Didier	France

The men's 200 metre individual medley SM9 event at the 2020 Paralympic Games took place on 1 September 2021, at the Tokyo Aquatics Centre.

== Heats ==
The swimmers with the top eight times, regardless of heat, advanced to the final.

Rank	Heat	Lane	Name	Nationality	Time	Notes
1	2	4	Timothy Hodge	Australia	2:17.41	Q
2	2	3	Yahor Shchalkanau	Belarus	2:20.00	Q
3	1	4	Ugo Didier	France	2:20.86	Q
4	2	5	Andrei Kalina	RPC	2:21.39	Q
5	1	6	Oscar Salguero Galisteo	Spain	2:23.73	Q
6	1	3	Jonas Kesnar	Czech Republic	2:24.03	Q
7	2	6	Jesse Reynolds	New Zealand	2:24.89	Q
8	2	1	Takuro Yamada	Japan	2:26.65	Q
9	1	1	Simone Ciulli	Italy	2:29.68	
9	1	7	Barry McClements	Ireland	2:29.68	
11	2	7	Ruiter Gonçalves	Brazil	2:30.24	
12	1	2	Igor Hrehorowicz	Poland	2:44.39	
	1	5	Federico Morlacchi	Italy	DSQ	
	2	2	Jacobo Garrido Brun	Spain	DSQ	

== Final ==
200m individual medley final
Rank	Lane	Name	Nationality	Time	Notes
1st place, gold medalist(s)	4	Denys Dubrov	Ukraine	2:20.96	
2nd place, silver medalist(s)	2	Xu Haijiao	China	2:21.06	
3rd place, bronze medalist(s)	1	Yang Guanglong	China	2:21.53	
4	5	Robert Griswold	United States	2:24.97	
5	7	Liu Fengqi	China	2:26.94	
6	3	Dimosthenis Michalentzakis	Greece	2:27.57	
7	6	Jesse Aungles	Australia	2:29.48	
8	8	Diogo Cancela	Portugal	2:33.36	
