= Cycling at the 2024 Summer Paralympics – Men's road time trial H5 =

Men's road time trial H5 at the XVII Paralympic Games
- Venue: Clichy-sous-Bois
- Dates: 4 September
- Competitors: 7 from 6 nations
- Winning time: 41:01.59

Medalists
1st place, gold medalist(s)		Mitch Valize	Netherlands
2nd place, silver medalist(s)		Loïc Vergnaud	France
3rd place, bronze medalist(s)		Luis Costa	Portugal

The Men's time trial H5 road cycling event at the 2024 Summer Paralympics took place on 4 September 2024, at Clichy-sous-Bois, Paris. Seven riders competed in the event.

The H5 classification is for handcyclists.

== Results ==
Rank	Rider	Nationality	Class	Time	Deficit
1st place, gold medalist(s)	Mitch Valize	Netherlands	H5	41:01.59	
2nd place, silver medalist(s)	Loïc Vergnaud	France	H5	43:20.40	+02:18.81
3rd place, bronze medalist(s)	Luis Costa	Portugal	H5	44:26.32	+03:24.73
4	Liu Qiangli	China	H5	44:40.85	+03:39.26
5	Tim de Vries	Netherlands	H5	45:13.72	+04:12.13
6	Pavlo Bal	Ukraine	H5	46:44.75	+05:43.16
7	Atachai Sriwichai	Thailand	H5	51:17.72	+10:16.10
