= Table tennis at the 2020 Summer Paralympics – Men's individual – Class 6 =

Table tennis at the XVI Paralympic Games
- Venue: Tokyo Metropolitan Gymnasium
- Dates: 25–28 August 2021
- Competitors: 15 from 15 nations

Medalists
1st place, gold medalist(s)		Ian Seidenfeld	United States
2nd place, silver medalist(s)		Peter Rosenmeier	Denmark
3rd place, bronze medalist(s)		Paul Karabardak	Great Britain
3rd place, bronze medalist(s)		Rungroj Thainiyom	Thailand

The Men's individual table tennis – Class 6 tournament at the 2020 Summer Paralympics in Tokyo took place during 25–28 August 2021 at Tokyo Metropolitan Gymnasium. Classes 6 – 10 are assigned to athletes who stands while competing. The lower the number, the greater the impact the impairment was on an athlete's ability to compete.

In the preliminary stage, athletes competed in five groups of three. Winners and runners-up of each group qualified for the knock-out stage. In this edition of the Games, no bronze medal match was held. Losers of each semifinal were automatically awarded a bronze medal.

Ian Seidenfeld of the United States beat the defending champion, Peter Rosenmeier of Denmark, in the gold medal match.

== Results ==
All times are local time in UTC+9.

=== Main bracket ===
==== Final rounds ====
Round of 16
C2	Thomas Rau (GER)	12	10	4	9
B2	Ian Seidenfeld (USA)	10	12	11	11
E2	Chen Chao (CHN)	11	11	11
A2	Kanellis Chatzikyriakos (GRE)	6	9	5

Quarterfinals
A1	Cristian Dettoni (CHI)	13	9	11	9	8
B2	Ian Seidenfeld (USA)	11	11	9	11	11
E1	Park Hong-kyu (KOR)	11	12	11
D1	Paul Karabardak (GBR)	7	10	7
C1	Rungroj Thainiyom (THA)	10	11	11	9	11
D2	Bobi Simion (ROU)	12	6	6	11	7
E2	Chen Chao (CHN)	6	11	8	8
B1	Peter Rosenmeier (DEN)	11	8	11	11

Semifinals
B2	Ian Seidenfeld (USA)	11	11	11
3rd place, bronze medalist(s)	Paul Karabardak (GBR)	6	2	6
3rd place, bronze medalist(s)	Rungroj Thainiyom (THA)	8	7	13	5
B1	Peter Rosenmeier (DEN)	11	11	11	11

Gold medal match
1st place, gold medalist(s)	Ian Seidenfeld (USA)	11	11	11
2nd place, silver medalist(s)	Peter Rosenmeier (DEN)	9	8	8

=== Preliminary round ===
Qualified for the knock-out stage

==== Group A ====
Rank	Athlete	Won	Lost	Sets diff
1	Cristian Dettoni (CHI)	1	1	+2
2	Kanellis Chatzikyriakos (GRE)	1	1	0
3	Alvaro Valera (ESP)	1	1	–2

Kanellis Chatzikyriakos (GRE)	4	11	11	9	7
Alvaro Valera (ESP)	11	9	5	11	11

Cristian Dettoni (CHI)	12	11	11
Alvaro Valera (ESP)	10	8	7

Cristian Dettoni (CHI)	11	11	10	9	6
Kanellis Chatzikyriakos (GRE)	8	5	12	11	11

==== Group B ====
Rank	Athlete	Won	Lost	Sets diff
1	Peter Rosenmeier (DEN)	2	0	+4
2	Ian Seidenfeld (USA)	1	1	+2
3	Matteo Parenzan (ITA)	0	2	–6

Ian Seidenfeld (USA)	7	11	7	11	8
Peter Rosenmeier (DEN)	11	9	11	9	11

Matteo Parenzan (ITA)	12	6	7
Peter Rosenmeier (DEN)	14	11	11

Matteo Parenzan (ITA)	9	12	7
Ian Seidenfeld (USA)	11	14	11

==== Group C ====
Rank	Athlete	Won	Lost	Sets diff
1	Rungroj Thainiyom (THA)	2	0	+6
2	Thomas Rau (GER)	1	1	0
3	Haris Eminovic (BIH)	0	2	–6

Haris Eminovic (BIH)	6	4	10
Rungroj Thainiyom (THA)	11	11	12

Thomas Rau (GER)	8	3	8
Rungroj Thainiyom (THA)	12	11	11

Thomas Rau (GER)	11	11	11
Haris Eminovic (BIH)	6	5	6

==== Group D ====
Rank	Athlete	Won	Lost	Sets diff
1	Paul Karabardak (GBR)	2	0	+5
2	Bobi Simion (ROU)	1	1	0
3	Trevor Hirth (AUS)	0	2	–5

Trevor Hirth (AUS)	7	13	2	3
Bobi Simion (ROU)	11	11	11	11

Paul Karabardak (GBR)	7	11	11	12
Bobi Simion (ROU)	11	7	8	10

Paul Karabardak (GBR)	11	11	11
Trevor Hirth (AUS)	5	8	2

==== Group E ====
Rank	Athlete	Won	Lost	Sets diff
1	Park Hong-kyu (KOR)	2	0	+5
2	Chen Chao (CHN)	1	1	+1
3	Ibrahim Elhusseiny Hamadtou (EGY)	0	2	–6

Ibrahim Elhusseiny Hamadtou (EGY)	6	4	9
Park Hong-kyu (KOR)	11	11	11

Chen Chao (CHN)	11	10	6	14
Park Hong-kyu (KOR)	6	12	11	16

Chen Chao (CHN)	11	11	11
Ibrahim Elhusseiny Hamadtou (EGY)	1	6	4
