= Paul Karabardak =

Welsh para table tennis player

Paul Arif Karabardak
Personal information
- Nickname: PK
- Nationality: Welsh
- Born: 3 October 1985 (age 40) Swansea, Wales
- Height: 5 ft 9 in (175 cm)

Sport
- Country: Great Britain
- Sport: Para table tennis
- Disability: Brain haemorrhage
- Disability class: C6
- Club: Cardiff TTC
- Coached by: Neil Robinson Nathan Thomas
Medal record
Para table tennis
Representing Great Britain
Paralympic Games
Silver medal – second place	2020 Tokyo	Team C6-7
Bronze medal – third place	2020 Tokyo	Singles C6
Bronze medal – third place	2024 Paris	Doubles MD14
World Championships
Bronze medal – third place	2014 Beijing	Men's teams C6-7
World Team Championships
Bronze medal – third place	2017 Bratislava	Men's teams C6
European Championships
Gold medal – first place	2017 Laško	Men's teams C6
Silver medal – second place	2011 Split	Men's teams C7
Silver medal – second place	2015 Vejle	Men's teams C6
Bronze medal – third place	2001 Frankfurt	Men's teams C7
Bronze medal – third place	2009 Genoa	Men's singles C7
Bronze medal – third place	2013 Lignano	Men's teams C7
Bronze medal – third place	2015 Laško	Men's singles C6

Paul Arif Karabardak (born 3 October 1985) is a Welsh para table tennis player who has competed in three Summer Paralympics.

== Biography ==
Karabardak was a keen footballer when he was a child but he suffered from a massive stroke aged 10, he played table tennis after his stroke in a local youth club.

== Sporting career ==
Aged 16 in 2001, Karabardak was chosen to participate in the GB Para Table Tennis Team in Frankfurt for the European Championships. He won his first national medal along with David Hope, a bronze in the teams' event. He continued to win two silver medals and two bronze medals in the team events. In 2017, in Laško, Slovenia, Karabardak won his first ever European gold medal with David Wetherill and Martin Perry after defeating Croatia in the final.

2008 Summer Paralympics in Beijing, China were Karabardak's first Paralympic Games. He lost in the group stage of the tournament after losing to two matches and winning one. In the 2012 Summer Paralympics, he was second in his group by winning against Kim Young Sung and losing to bronze medalist Mykhaylo Popov. At his third games in Rio de Janeiro, he was bottom of his group and didn't advance to the final rounds.
