= Swimming at the 2020 Summer Paralympics – Women's 100 metre breaststroke SB4 =

Women's 100 metre breaststroke SB4 at the XVI Paralympic Games
- Venue: Tokyo Aquatics Centre
- Dates: 29 August 2021
- Competitors: 10 from 7 nations

Medalists
1st place, gold medalist(s)		Fanni Illés	Hungary
2nd place, silver medalist(s)		Giulia Ghiretti	Italy
3rd place, bronze medalist(s)		Yao Cuan	China

The Women's 100 metre breaststroke SB4 event at the 2020 Paralympic Games took place on 29 August 2021, at the Tokyo Aquatics Centre.

== Heats ==
The swimmers with the top eight times, regardless of heat, advanced to the final.

Rank	Heat	Lane	Name	Nationality	Time	Notes
1	2	4	Fanni Illés	Hungary	1:44.68	Q
2	2	3	Cheng Jiao	China	1:47.82	Q
3	2	5	Yao Cuan	China	1:50.70	Q
4	1	4	Giulia Ghiretti	Italy	1:52.67	Q
5	1	3	Zhang Li	China	1:53.28	Q
6	1	5	Monica Boggioni	Italy	1:55.69	Q
7	2	6	Natalia Shavel	Belarus	2:04.62	Q
8	1	2	Malak Abdelshafi	Egypt	2:13.27	Q
9	1	6	Mayumi Narita	Japan	2:18.64	
-	2	2	Suzanna Hext	Great Britain	DNS	

== Final ==
Rank	Lane	Name	Nationality	Time	Notes
1st place, gold medalist(s)	4	Fanni Illés	Hungary	1:44.41	
2nd place, silver medalist(s)	6	Giulia Ghiretti	Italy	1:50.36	
3rd place, bronze medalist(s)	3	Yao Cuan	China	1:50.77	
4	2	Zhang Li	China	1:51.96	
5	5	Cheng Jiao	China	1:52.17	
6	7	Monica Boggioni	Italy	1:58.28	
7	1	Natalia Shavel	Belarus	2:02.58	
8	8	Malak Abdelshafi	Egypt	2:14.68	
