= Vittoria Bianco =

Italian Paralympic swimmer (born 1995)

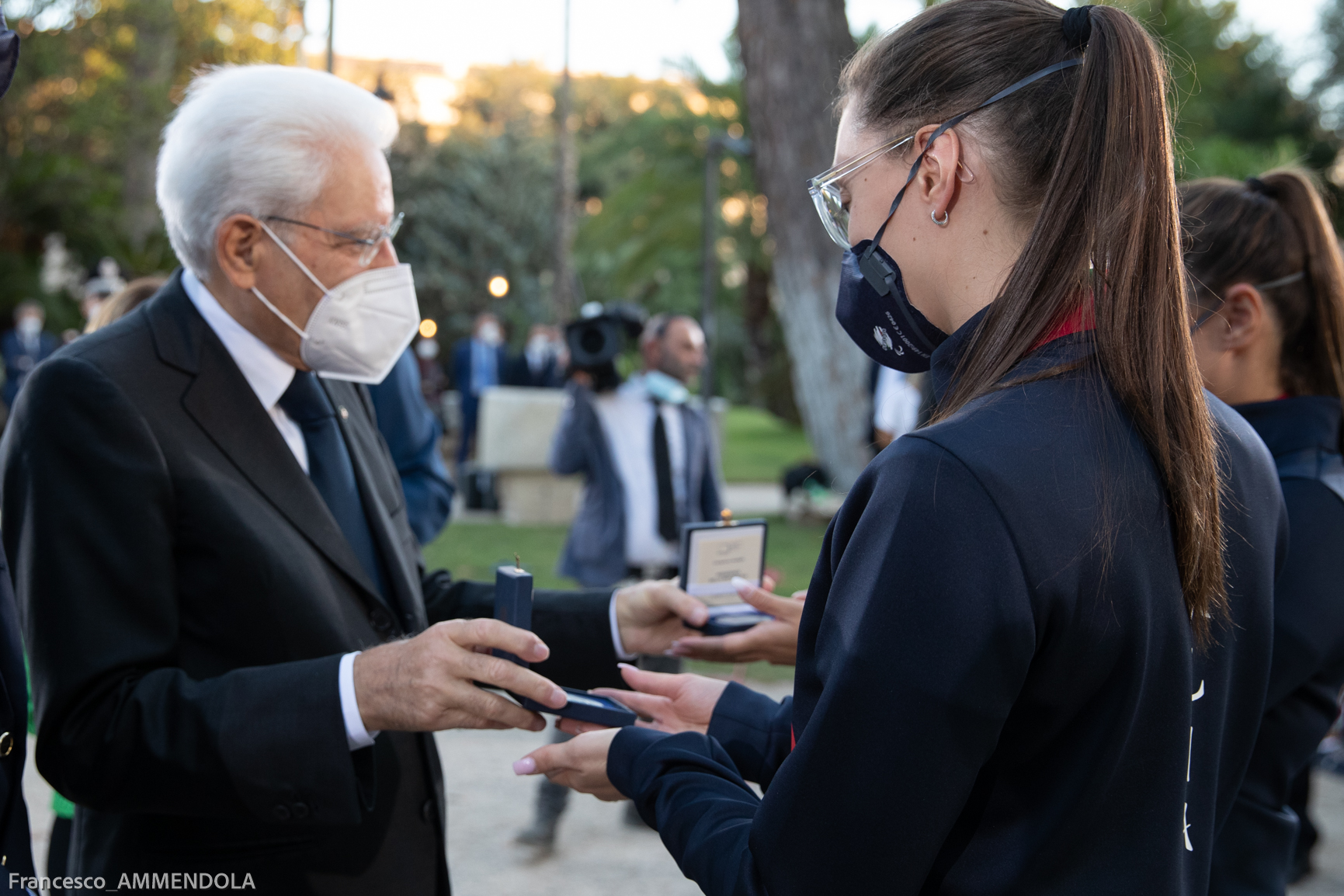
- Bianco (with glasses) awarded by Sergio Mattarella at Quirinale Palace in 2021.

Personal information
- National team: Italy
- Born: 7 October 1995 (age 30) Putignano, Italy

Sport
- Sport: Paralympic swimming
- Disability class: S9
Medal record
Paralympic swimming
Representing Italy
Event	1st	2nd	3rd
Paralympics	1	0	1
European Championships	1	0	1
Total	2	0	2
Paralympic Games
Bronze medal – third place	2024 Paris	400 m freestyle S9

Vittoria Bianco (born 7 October 1995) is an Italian Paralympic swimmer.

== Career ==
She competed at the 2020 Summer Paralympics, participating in the women's 100m freestyle S9, and the women's 400m freestyle S9.

== See also ==
- Italy at the 2020 Summer Paralympics
