= Athletics at the 2020 Summer Paralympics – Men's 1500 metres T20 =

Men's 1500 metres T20 at the XVI Paralympic Games
- Venue: Tokyo National Stadium
- Dates: 3 September 2021 (final)
- Competitors: 14 from 10 nations
- Winning time: 3:54.57

Medalists
1st place, gold medalist(s)		Owen Miller	Great Britain
2nd place, silver medalist(s)		Alexandr Rabotnitskii	RPC
3rd place, bronze medalist(s)		Ndiaga Dieng	Italy

The men's 1500 metres T20 event at the 2020 Summer Paralympics in Tokyo took place on 3 September 2021.

The T20 category is for athletes with intellectual impairment. T20 athletes have an IQ score of 75 or less.

== Records ==
Prior to the competition, the existing records were as follows:

World Record	Michael Brannigan (USA)	3:45.50	New York, United States	11 February 2017
Paralympic Record	Michael Brannigan (USA)	3:51.73	Rio de Janeiro, Brazil	13 September 2016

Area	Time	Athlete	Nation
Africa	4:31.47	Record Mark	
America	3:45.50 WR	Michael Brannigan	United States
Asia	3:53.35	Daiki Akai	Japan
Europe	3:54.36	Alexandr Rabotnitskii	Russia
Oceania	4:11.81	Kyle McIntosh	Australia

== Results ==
The final took place on 3 September 2021, at 10:13:

Rank	Name	Nationality	Time	Notes
1st place, gold medalist(s)	Owen Miller	Great Britain	3:54.57	
2nd place, silver medalist(s)	Alexandr Rabotnitskii	RPC	3:55.78	
3rd place, bronze medalist(s)	Ndiaga Dieng	Italy	3:57.24	
4	Michael Brannigan	United States	3:58.43	SB
5	Daiki Akai	Japan	3:58.78	
6	Pavel Sarkeev	RPC	4:00.43	
7	Daniel Pek	Poland	4:01.00	SB
8	Yuki Iwata	Japan	4:01.72	
9	Yuji Togawa	Japan	4:03.62	
10	Carmelo Rivera Fuentes	Puerto Rico	4:03.68	PB
11	Cristiano Pereira	Portugal	4:05.10	
12	Sandro Patricio Correia Baessa	Portugal	4:05.50	
13	Pavlo Voluikevych	Ukraine	4:05.75	
14	Gaël Geffroy	France	4:15.52	
