= Alexandr Rabotnitskii =

Russian Paralympic athlete (1993–2025)

Alexandr Rabotnitskii (Russian: Александр Работницкий; 21 September 1993 – 23 March 2025) was a Russian Paralympic athlete. He won silver in the Men's 1500 metres T20 at the 2020 Summer Paralympics in Tokyo.

Rabotnitskii died on 23 March 2025 in the war in Ukraine, at the age of 31, taking part in combat operations on the side of Russia as a volunteer.
