= Owen Miller (runner) =

British Paralympic athlete (born 1991)

Owen Miller MBE
Personal information
- Born: 1 November 1991 (age 34) Dunfermline, Scotland, Great Britain

Sport
- Country: Great Britain
- Sport: Paralympic athletics
- Disability class: T20
- Event: 1500 metres
- Club: Fife Athletics Club
- Coached by: Steve Doig
Medal record
Paralympic athletics
Representing Great Britain
Paralympic Games
Gold medal – first place	2020 Tokyo	1500m T20

Owen Miller (born 1 November 1991) is a British Paralympic athlete. He won gold in the Men's 1500 metres T20 at the 2020 Summer Paralympics in Tokyo.

Miller was appointed Member of the Order of the British Empire (MBE) in the 2022 New Year Honours for services to athletics.
