= Ndiaga Dieng =

Italian Paralympic athlete

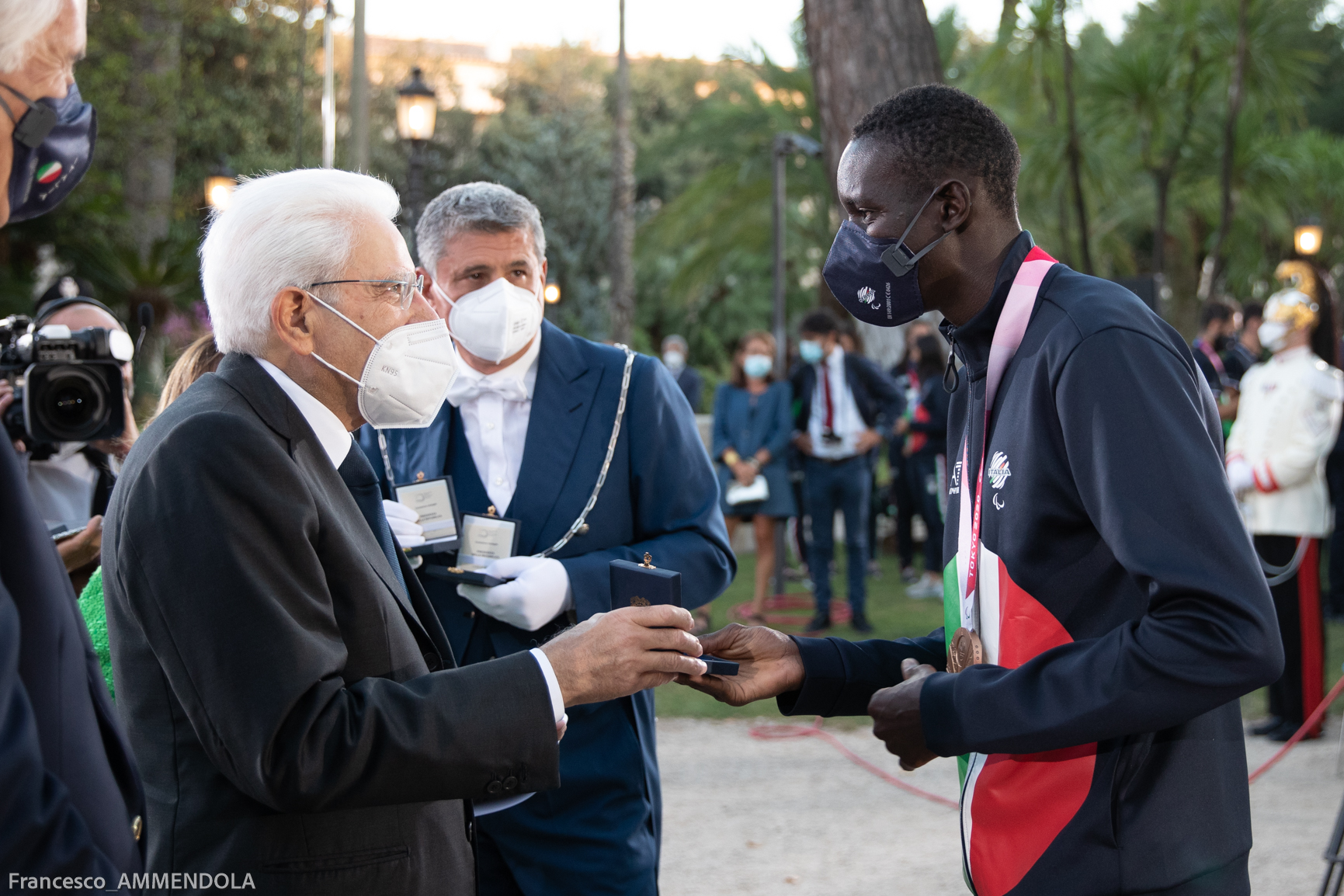
- Dieng awarded by the Italian President Sergio Mattarella at Quirinale Palace in 2021.

Personal information
- Nationality: Senegalese and Italian
- Born: 17 July 1999 (age 27)

Sport
- Sport: Para athletics
- Disability class: T20
- Events: 400 metres, 800 metres, 1500 metres
- Club: Anthropos Civitanova Marche
- Coached by: Maurizio Iesari
Medal record
Men's para-athletics
Representing Italy
Paralympic Games
Bronze medal – third place	2020 Tokyo	1500 m T20
World Championships
Gold medal – first place	2025 New Delhi	800 m T20
European Championships
Bronze medal – third place	2021 Bydgoszcz	1500 m T20

Ndiaga Dieng (born 17 July 1999) is an Italian para-athlete of Senegalese descent who represented Italy at the 2020 and 2024 Summer Paralympics.

== Career ==
Of Senegalese and later acquired Italian citizenship, Dieng represented Italy at the 2020 Summer Paralympics in the 1500 metres T20 event and won a bronze medal. He competed at the 2020 Italian U23 Palaindoor Ancona, and 2021 Palaindoor Ancona, in 800 metres and 1500 metres.
