= Edoardo Giordan =

Italian wheelchair fencer (born 1993)

Personal information
- Born: 23 April 1993 (age 33) Rome, Italy

Sport
- Country: Italy
- Sport: Wheelchair fencing
- Event: Sabre
Medal record
Paralympic Games
Bronze medal – third place	2024 Paris	Sabre A

Edoardo Giordan (born 23 April 1993) is an Italian wheelchair fencer. He competed at the Summer Paralympics in 2020 and in 2024, where he won the bronze medal in the men's sabre A event.
