= Giulia Ghiretti =

Italian Paralympic swimmer

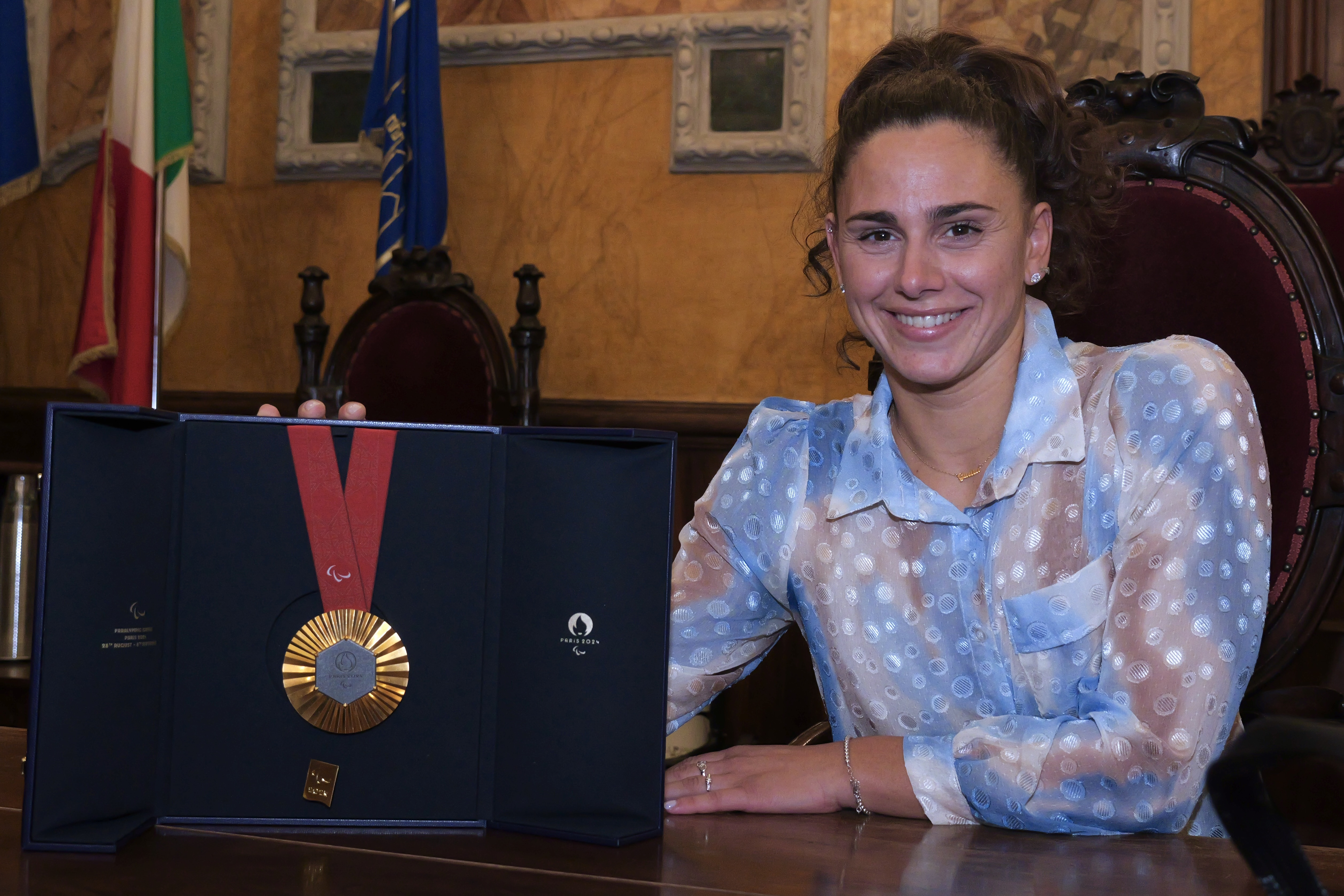
- Ghiretti in 2024 with her Paralympic gold medal

Personal information
- Nationality: Italian
- Born: 16 February 1994 (age 32) Parma, Italy
- Height: 1.67 m (5 ft 6 in)
- Website: www.giuliaghiretti.it

Sport
- Country: Italy
- Sport: Paralympic swimming
- Disability class: S5, SB4, SM5
- Club: Fiamme Oro
Medal record
Paralympic swimming
Representing Italy
Paralympic Games
Gold medal – first place	2024 Paris	100 m breaststroke SB4
Silver medal – second place	2016 Rio de Janeiro	100 m breaststroke SB4
Silver medal – second place	2020 Tokyo	100 m breaststroke SB4
Bronze medal – third place	2016 Rio de Janeiro	50 m butterfly S5
World Championships
Silver medal – second place	2022 Madeira	200 m ind. medley SM5
European Championships
Silver medal – second place	2026 Kocaeli	100 m breaststroke SB4

Giulia Ghiretti (born 16 February 1994) is an Italian para-swimmer. At the 2016 Summer Paralympics in Rio she won a bronze medal in the 50m Butterfly S5, and a silver in the 100m Breaststroke SB4. She also won the silver medal at the 2020 Summer Paralympics, in 100 metre breaststroke SB4. At the 2024 Summer Paralympics in Paris she won gold in the 100 metre breaststroke SB4.

== Career ==
Ghiretti was born in Parma. She was originally a trampolinist until a training accident in January 2010 which caused her spinal injury. In 2011 she began swimming, and made her international competitive debut at the 2013 IPC Swimming World Championships in Montreal.

Grimaldi an athlete of the Gruppo Sportivo Fiamme Oro.

== Achievements ==
Year	Competition	Venue	Position	Event	Notes
2013	World Championships	(Canada) Montreal	2nd	4 x 50 metre freestyle relay 20 pts	
2015	World Championships	(United Kingdom) Glasgow	2nd	100 metre breaststroke SB4	
2016	Paralympic Games	(Brazil) Rio de Janeiro	3rd	50 metre butterfly S5	
2016	Paralympic Games	(Brazil) Rio de Janeiro	2nd	100 metre breaststroke SB4	
2017	World Championships	Mexico City	1st	100 metre Breaststroke SB4	
2017	World Championships	Mexico City	3rd	50 metre Butterfly S5	
2017	World Championships	Mexico City	2nd	Mixed 4 x 50 metre Freestyle 20pts	
2019	World Championships	(United Kingdom) London	2nd	100 metre Breaststroke SB4	
2019	World Championships	(United Kingdom) London	3rd	200 metre Individual Medley SM5	
2021	Paralympic Games	(Japan) Tokyo	2nd	100 metre breaststroke SB4	
2024	Paralympic Games	(France) Paris	1st	100 metre breaststroke SB4	
