= Ruslan Kuznetsov =

Russian para-cyclist

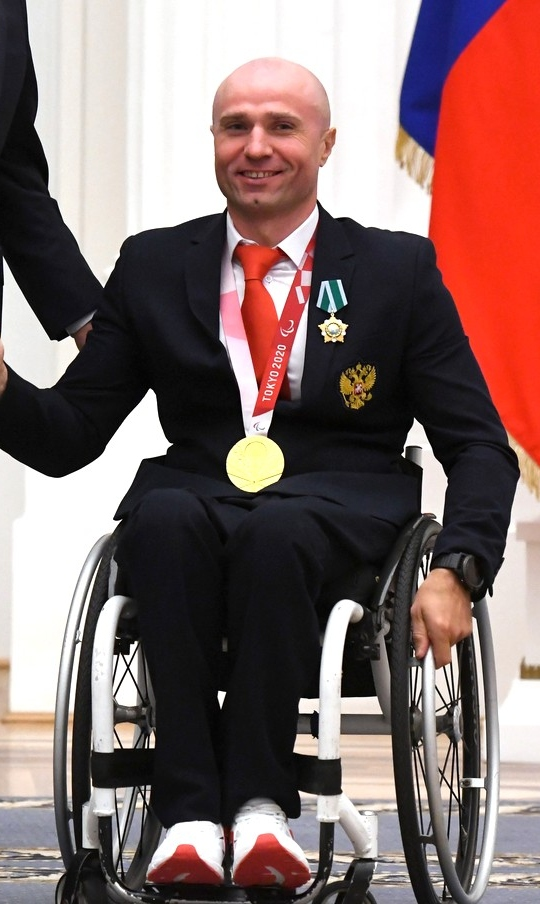
- Kuznetsov in 2021

Personal information
- Nationality: Russian
- Born: 20 October 1980 (age 45) Moscow, Russia

Sport
- Sport: Para-cycling
- Disability class: H3
- Club: Youth of Moscow
- Coached by: Alexei Chunosov; Alexander Lagutin
Medal record
Representing RPC
Paralympic Games
Gold medal – first place	2020 Tokyo	Road race H3

Ruslan Kuznetsov (born 20 October 1980) is a Russian Para-cyclist who represented Russian Paralympic Committee athletes at the 2020 Summer Paralympics.

== Career ==
Kuznetsov represented Russian Paralympic Committee athletes at the 2020 Summer Paralympics in the road time trial H3 event and finished in fourth place with a time of 43:49.24. He also competed in the road race H3 event and won a gold medal. National championship: 2016 1st place in road race 35 km, 2017 1st place in time trial 15 km, 2018 2nd place time trial 15 km, 2019 1st place in time trial 15 km, 2020 1st place in time trial 15 km, 2021 1st place in time trial 15 km. UCI Road world cup Ostend Belgium 2021 3rd place in time trial.
