= Riadh Tarsim =

French para-cyclist (born 1973)

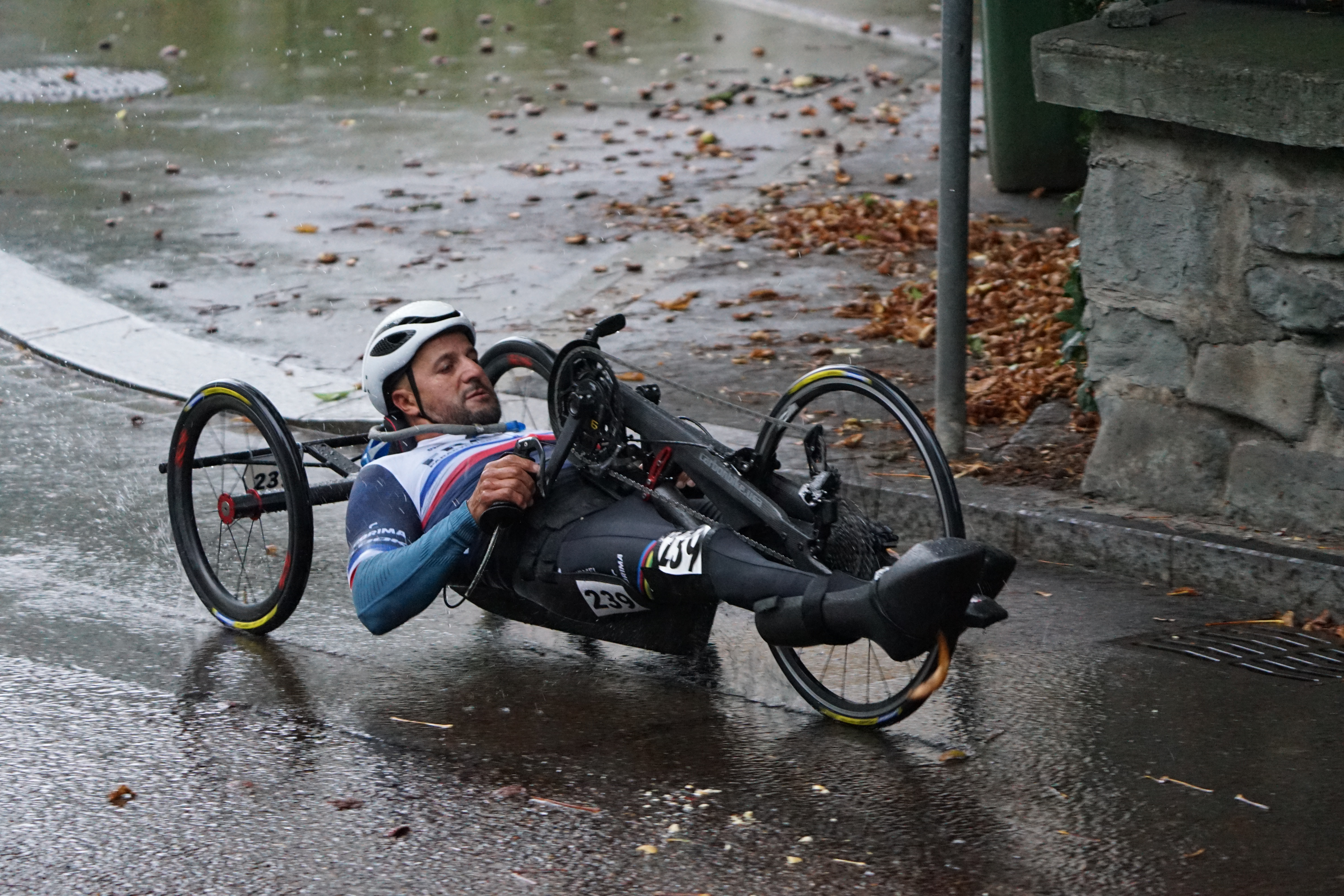
- Riadh Tarsim during the 2024 World Championships

Personal information
- Born: 22 October 1973 (age 52) Zarzis, Tunisia

Sport
- Country: France
- Sport: Para-cycling
- Disability class: H3
Medal record
Men's para-cycling
Representing France
Paralympic Games
| Silver medal – second place | 2020 Tokyo | mixed team relay H1–5 |
Road World Championships
| Gold medal – first place | 2021 Cascais | Road race H3 |

Riadh Tarsim (born 22 October 1973) is a French para-cyclist who represented France at the 2020 Summer Paralympics.

== Career ==
Tarsim represented France at 2021 UCI Para-cycling Road World Championships where he won gold in the road race H3 event.

Tarsim represented France at the 2020 Summer Paralympics in the mixed team relay H1–5 event and won a silver medal.
