= Matteo Parenzan =

Italian para table tennis player

Personal information
- Born: 23 June 2003 (age 23) Trieste, Italy

Sport
- Sport: Table tennis
- Disability class: 6
Medal record
Men's para table tennis
Representing Italy
Paralympic Games
Gold medal – first place	2024 Paris	Singles C6
World Championships
Gold medal – first place	2022 Granada	Singles C6
European Championships
Gold medal – first place	2023 Sheffield	Singles C6

Matteo Parenzan (born 23 June 2003) is an Italian para table tennis player. He competed at the 2024 Summer Paralympics and reached the finals of the men's individual class 6 event.
