= Mitch Valize =

Dutch para-cyclist

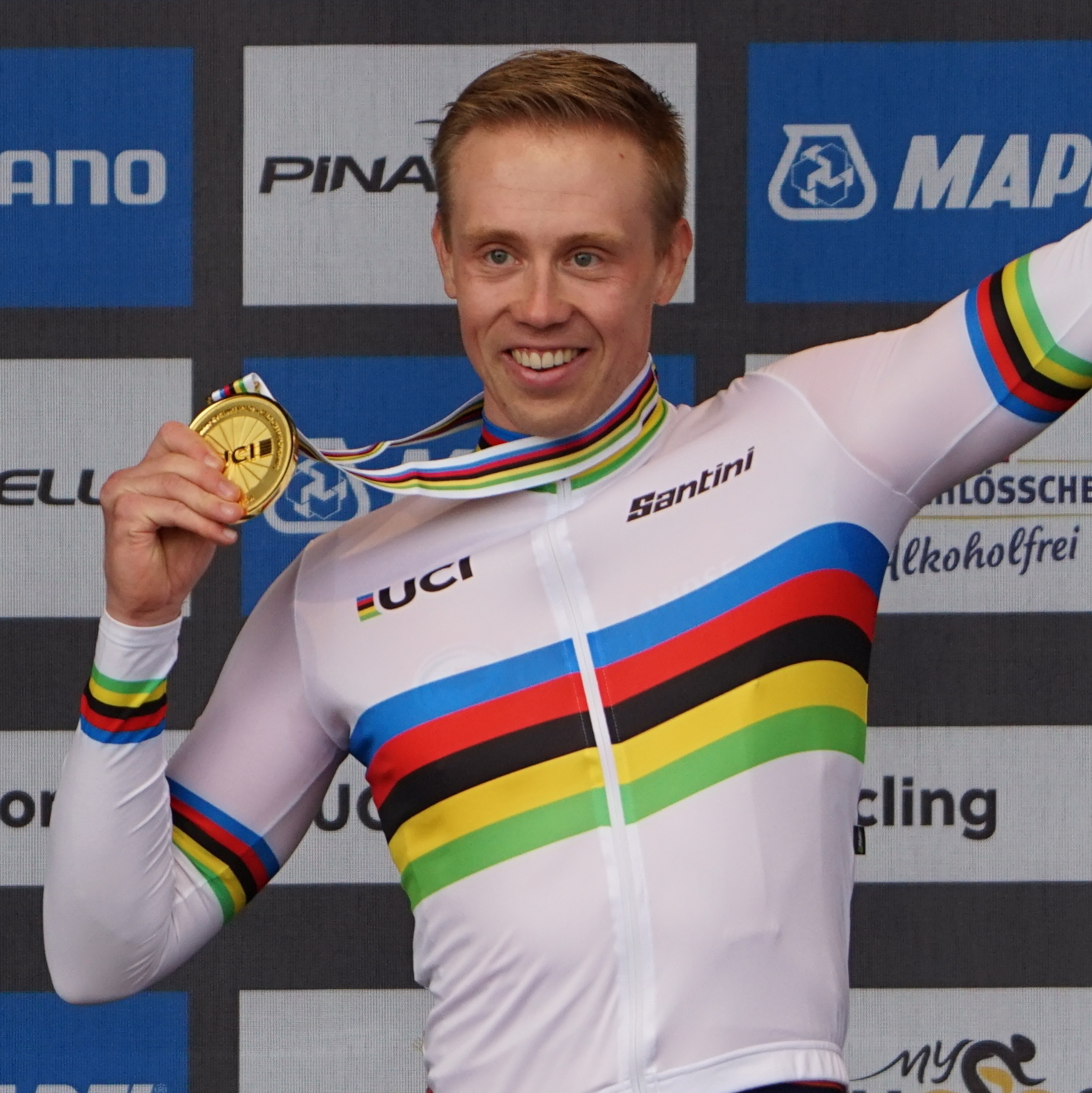
- Valize at the 2024 World Championships

Personal information
- Nationality: Dutch
- Born: 7 June 1995 (age 31) Heerlen, Netherlands

Sport
- Sport: Para-cycling
- Disability class: H5
- Coached by: Eelke van der Wal
Medal record
Event	1st	2nd	3rd
Paralympic Games	4	0	0
Road World Championships	10	0	0
European Para Championships	1	1	0
Total	15	1	0
Representing Netherlands
Men's para-cycling
Paralympic Games
Gold medal – first place	2020 Tokyo	Road time trial H5
Gold medal – first place	2020 Tokyo	Road race H5
Gold medal – first place	2024 Paris	Road time trial H5
Gold medal – first place	2024 Paris	Road race H5
Road World Championships
Gold medal – first place	2021 Cascais	Road race H5
Gold medal – first place	2021 Cascais	Time trial H5
Gold medal – first place	2022 Baie-Comeau	Road race H5
Gold medal – first place	2022 Baie-Comeau	Time trial H5
Gold medal – first place	2023 Glasgow	Road race H5
Gold medal – first place	2023 Glasgow	Time trial H5
Gold medal – first place	2024 Zurich	Road race H5
Gold medal – first place	2024 Zurich	Time trial H5
Gold medal – first place	2025 Ronse	Road race H5
Gold medal – first place	2025 Ronse	Time trial H5
European Championships
Gold medal – first place	2023 Rotterdam	Time trial H5
Silver medal – second place	2023 Rotterdam	Road race H5

Mitch Valize (born 7 June 1995) is a Dutch Para-cyclist who represented the Netherlands at the 2020 and 2024 Summer Paralympics. He won four gold medals at the Summer Paralympics.

== Career ==
Valize represented the Netherlands in the men's road time trial H5 event at the 2020 Summer Paralympics and won a gold medal. He also won a gold medal in the men's road race H5 event.
