= Alfredo de los Santos (cyclist) =

American para-cyclist

Personal information
- Nickname: Freddie
- Nationality: American
- Born: October 17, 1969 (age 56) Santo Domingo, Dominican Republic

Sport
- Sport: Para-cycling
- Disability class: H5
Medal record
Men's Para-cycling
Representing United States
Paralympic Games
Bronze medal – third place	2020 Tokyo	Mixed team relay H1–5
Parapan American Games
Gold medal – first place	2023 Santiago	H3–5 Road race
Road World Championships
Silver medal – second place	2017 Pietermaritzburg	Mixed team relay H1–5

Alfredo de los Santos (born October 17, 1969) is a Dominican-American para-cyclist. He represented the United States in the 2016 and 2020 Summer Paralympics. In the latter, he won a bronze medal in the mixed team relay H1–5.

De los Santos has a bachelor's degree in graphic design from City College of New York and served in the United States Army. He was injured during a grenade attack in Afghanistan in 2009, resulting in traumatic brain injury and his right leg being amputated above the knee.

De los Santos has won the men's handcycle division of the Boston Marathon twice, in 2022 and 2025.
