= Simone Ciulli =

Italian swimmer (born 1986)

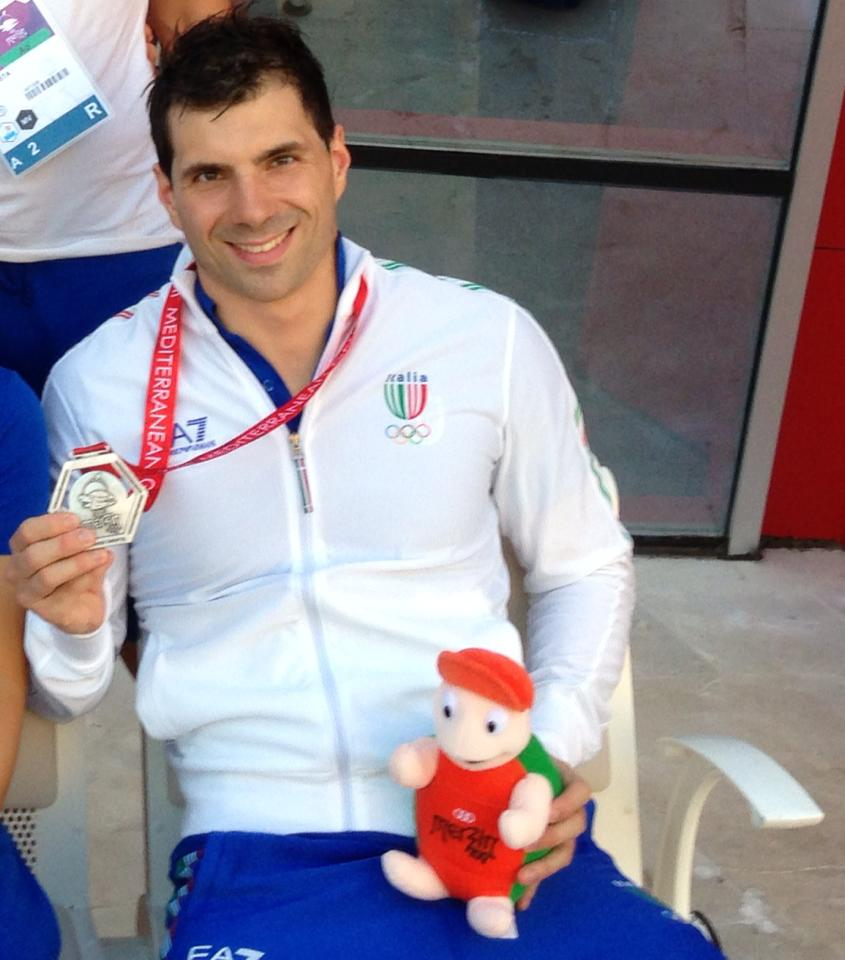

Personal information
- Nationality: Italy
- Born: 9 May 1986 (age 40) Florence, Italy
- Height: 1.83 m (6 ft 0 in)
- Weight: 73 kg (161 lb)

Sport
- Sport: Swimming
- Strokes: S9 freestyle, butterfly
- Club: C.C. Aniene - Fiamme Azzurre
- Coach: Paolo Palchetti
Medal record
Paralympic swimming
Representing Italy
Paralympic Games
| Silver medal – second place | 2020 Tokyo | 4×100 m freestyle 34 pts |
World Championships
| Bronze medal – third place | 2019 London | 50 m freestyle - S9 |
European Championships
| Bronze medal – third place | 2016 Funchal | 50 m freestyle - S10 |
| Bronze medal – third place | 2016 Funchal | 4x100 freestyle relay 34pts |
Mediterranean Games
| Silver medal – second place | 2013 Mersin | 100 m freestyle |

Simone Ciulli (born 9 May 1986) is an Italian swimmer who competes in Paralympic S9 events. and who has been a member of the Italian National Swim Team since 2013. In August 2021, he won a silver medal at the XVI Paralympic Games in Tokyo 2020. In September 2019, he won a bronze medal at the Paralympic World Swimming Championship in London. He has also won a silver at the Mediterranean Games of Mersin in 2013 and two bronze medals at the European Championships in Funchal in 2016.

== Career ==
Since birth, Ciulli has had cerebral palsy. This has caused him a half-paresis on the right side of his body and from perineuroma which is located on his right sciatic nerve.

In 2012, he was introduced to the Paralympic organization and entered the world of Paralympic swimming by participating at the Italian Paralympic Swimming Championships in Pietralata, with Po.Ha.Fi. team. There, he was first classified as an S10, SM10 and SB9. At that meet, he broke two Italian records in the 50 and 100 freestyle.

In 2013, he was invited for the first time to join the Italian national Paralympic swimming team and competed for the red, white and green at his first international meet in Berlin.

A few months later, he was invited, together with the paralympic champion Federico Morlacchi, to compete at the XVII Mediterranean Games, in Mersin Turkey, where he won the silver medal in the 100 freestyle with a time of 57 "14.

That same year he was selected by the National Team to take part in the FINA World Cup for non-disabled swimmers in Eindhoven. There he won three gold medals in the 50 and 100 freestyle and the 100 IM. At that same event, he competed together with non-disabled athletes from the Italian National Swimming Team including, Gregorio Paltrinieri, Fabio Scozzoli, Ilaria Bianchi and Federico Turrini.

In August 2014 at the European Paralympic Swimming Championships in Eindhoven, he broke the Italian S10 long course national record with a time of 25"18, while placing fourth in the event. In Eindhoven, he also set the Italian S10 national backstroke record in the 4x100 mixed relay with a time of 1'04"69.

In 2015, he once again was invited to join the National swim team to compete in an international meet in Berlin where he established two new Italian national S10 records in the 100 freestyle with a time of 56"35 and in the 100 butterfly, with a time of 1'00"88. These times were just a few tenths of a second away for the qualifying time for 2016 Paralympics in Rio de Janeiro.

In 2016 at the European Championships in Funchal he won two bronze medals. One in the 50 freestyle with a time of 25"40 and the other in the 4x100 mixed relay.

In 2017 at the Italian Winter Paralympic Swimming Championships held in Portici, he became the first Italian Paralympic athlete to swim the 50 freestyle under 25 seconds (24"89) and the 100 freestyle under 55 seconds (54"77), also establishing the new national short course records.

At the 2019 World Series in Lignano, he was reclassified as an S9, SM9 SB8 swimmer because the tumor located on his right sciatic nerve grew and progressively hampered the functionality of his lower right leg.

In September 2019, he represented Italy at the World Paralympic Swimming Championships in London, where he won a bronze medal in the 50 metres freestyle with a time of 26"04 and he became World Champion with the National Team of Italy.

In August 2021, he was called to XVI Paralympic Games in Tokyo 2020, winning a silver medal in the 4x100 freestyle relay with the time of 3'.45''.89 that was a new European Record.

In August 2024, he was called to XVII Paralympic Games in Paris 2024, where, due to an injury, he was unable to go beyond 12th position in the 50 freestyle.

In September 2025, at the age of 39, he qualified for the final of the 50 m freestyle at the 2025 Paralympic World Championships in Singapore, finishing eighth, just six-tenths of a second away from the podium.

== Extra-competitive activities ==
In 2011 he graduated with a master's degree in Law and subsequently, in 2015 passed the Bar exam to earn his license to practice. He has elected to not pursue his law career until he retires from competitive swimming.

Concurrently in 2014, he obtain a number of state certifications to expand his expertise in swimming and water safety. His certifications include, life guard, second level triathlon trainer, water polo instructor, various fitness instructor, swim school coordinator, as well as sports and facilities management.

Since 2010, he has also been the head coach Klab Nuoto Master Swim Team in Florence, Italy. He has built the program from scratch currently counts over 100 athletes: as of 2019, Klab Nuoto Masters has won six consecutive Italian Master Swimming Championships U.I.S.P.

Additionally, since 2016 he has been the personal trainer of Noura Mana, who is a member of the Moroccan National Swimming Team and who participated in the Olympic Games of Rio de Janeiro in 2016. Under Ciulli's guidance, she has broken two Moroccan national records, in the 50 freestyle (25 and 50 metres). She has won a bronze medal at the 2019 Pan-African Games in Casablanca and has also participated at the World Short Course Championships in 2018 in Hangzhou.
