= Ryan Pinney =

American para-cyclist

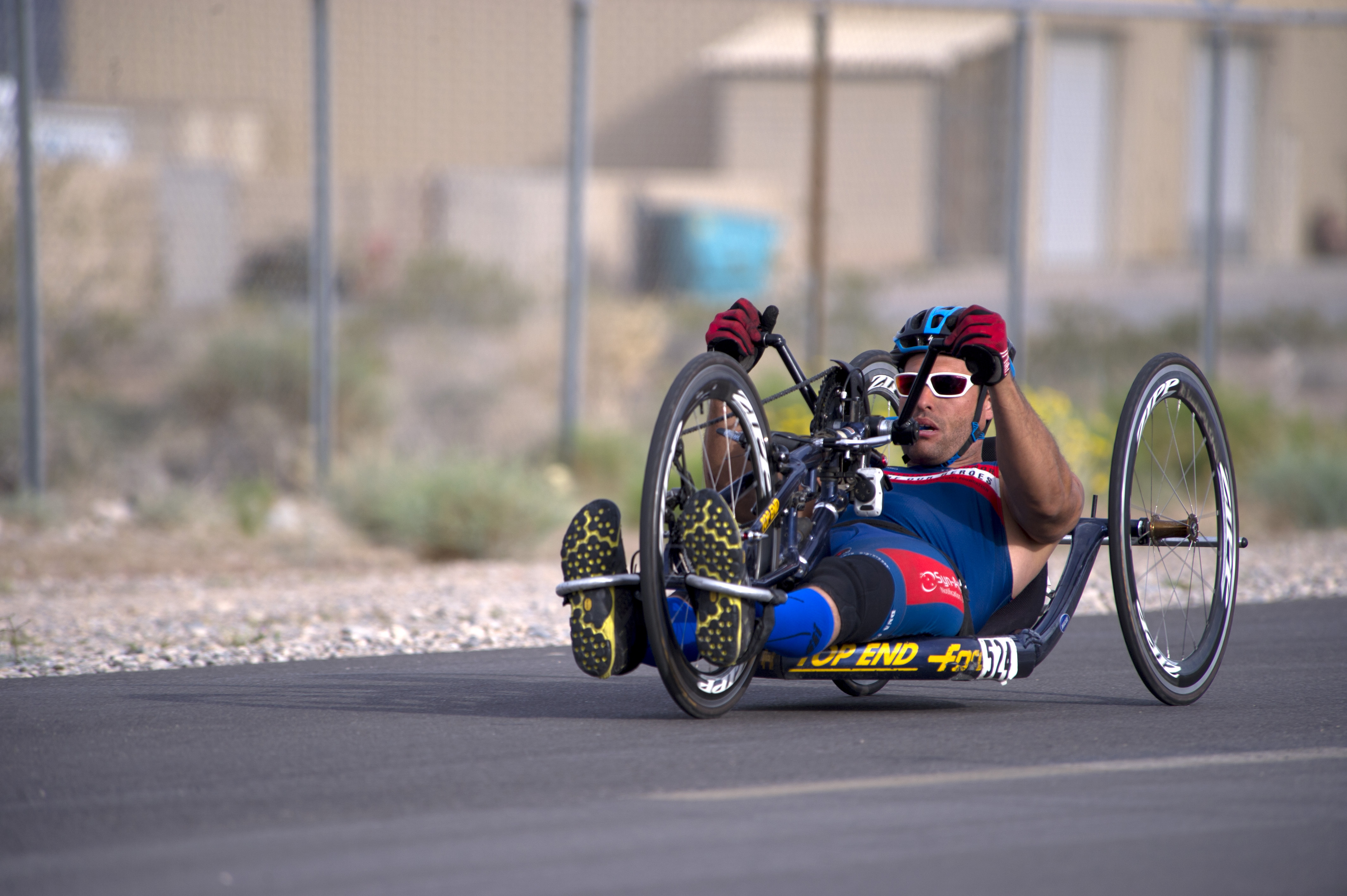
- Pinney in the 2014 Wounded Warrior Air Force Trials at Nellis Air Force Base, Las Vegas

Personal information
- Nationality: American
- Born: November 10, 1980 (age 45) Phoenix, Arizona

Sport
- Sport: Para-cycling
- Disability class: H3
- Club: Team PossAbilities
Medal record
Men's Para-cycling
Representing the United States
Paralympic Games
Bronze medal – third place	2020 Tokyo	mixed team relay H1–5
Road World Championships
Silver medal – second place	2023 Glasgow	Road time trial H3

Ryan Pinney (born November 10, 1980) is an American para-cyclist who represented the United States at the 2020 Summer Paralympics in the mixed team relay H1–5 event and won a bronze medal.

Pinney earlier served as an aerial refueler in the United States Air Force and the Arizona National Guard for 14 years. He broke his back while BMX riding in 2012, leaving him paralyzed from the waist down and with a new aspiration.
