= Gary O'Reilly (cyclist) =

Irish para-cyclist

Personal information
- Nationality: Irish
- Born: 10 May 1993 (age 33) Portlaoise, Ireland

Sport
- Sport: Para-cycling
- Disability class: H5
Medal record
Men's Para-cycling
Representing Ireland
Paralympic Games
Bronze medal – third place	2020 Tokyo	Road time trial H5
Road World Championships
Bronze medal – third place	2021 Cascais	Time trial (H5)

Gary O'Reilly (born 10 May 1993) is an Irish Para-cyclist who represented Ireland in the 2020 Summer Paralympics.

== Career ==
O'Reilly represented Ireland in the men's road time trial H5 event at the 2020 Summer Paralympics and won a bronze medal.
