= Loïc Vergnaud =

French para-cyclist

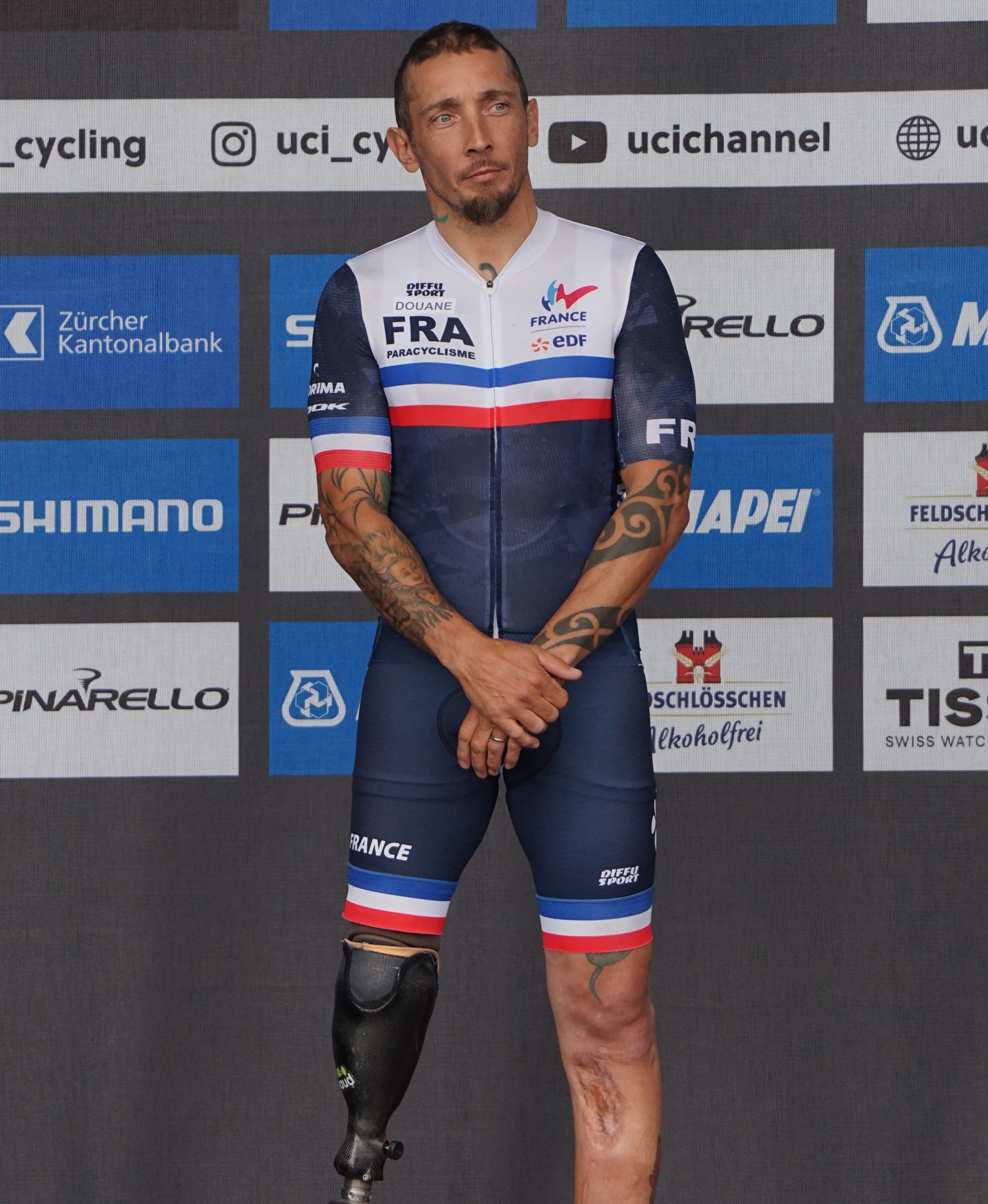
- Vergnaud at the 2024 Road World Championships

Personal information
- Nationality: French
- Born: 1 December 1978 (age 47)

Sport
- Sport: Para-cycling
- Disability class: H5
Medal record
Event	1st	2nd	3rd
Paralympic Games	0	4	0
Road World Championships	0	8	1
European Para Championships	0	1	1
Total	0	13	2
Men's Para-cycling
Representing France
Paralympic Games
Silver medal – second place	2020 Tokyo	Road time trial H5
Silver medal – second place	2020 Tokyo	Road race H5
Silver medal – second place	2024 Paris	Road time trial H5
Silver medal – second place	2024 Paris	Road race H5
Road World Championships
Silver medal – second place	2021 Cascais	Road race H5
Silver medal – second place	2021 Cascais	Time trial H5
Silver medal – second place	2022 Baie-Comeau	Road race H5
Silver medal – second place	2022 Baie-Comeau	Time trial H5
Silver medal – second place	2024 Zurich	Road race H5
Silver medal – second place	2024 Zurich	Time trial H5
Silver medal – second place	2025 Ronse	Road race H5
Silver medal – second place	2025 Ronse	Time trial H5
Bronze medal – third place	2023 Glasgow	Road race H5
European Championships
Silver medal – second place	2023 Rotterdam	Time trial H5
Bronze medal – third place	2023 Rotterdam	Road race H5

Loïc Vergnaud (born 1 December 1978) is a French Para-cyclist who represented France at the 2020 and 2024 Summer Paralympics.

== Career ==
Vergnaud represented France at 2021 UCI Para-cycling Road World Championships where he won silver in the road race H5 and road time trial H5 events.

Vergnaud represented France in the men's road time trial H5 event at the 2020 Summer Paralympics and won a silver medal. He also won a silver medal in the men's road race H5 event.
