= Luis Costa (cyclist) =

Portuguese Para-cyclist (born 1973)

Personal information
- Nationality: Portuguese
- Born: 10 June 1973 (age 53) Castro Verde, Portugal

Sport
- Sport: Para-cycling
- Disability class: H5
Medal record
Men's para-cycling
Representing Portugal
Paralympic Games
Bronze medal – third place	2024 Paris	Road time trial H5

Luis Costa (born 10 June 1973) is a Portuguese para-cyclist.

== Career ==
Costa represented Portugal at the 2024 Summer Paralympics and won a bronze medal in the road time trial H5 event. On 2 September 2024, Costa committed an anti-doping violation after returning a positive test result for the banned substance Chlorthalidone. In December 2024, the International Paralympic Committee (IPC) stripped Costa of his medal and referred his doping case to the Union Cycliste Internationale (UCI) for potential further disciplinary action.
