= Diego Colombari =

Italian Paralympic cyclist

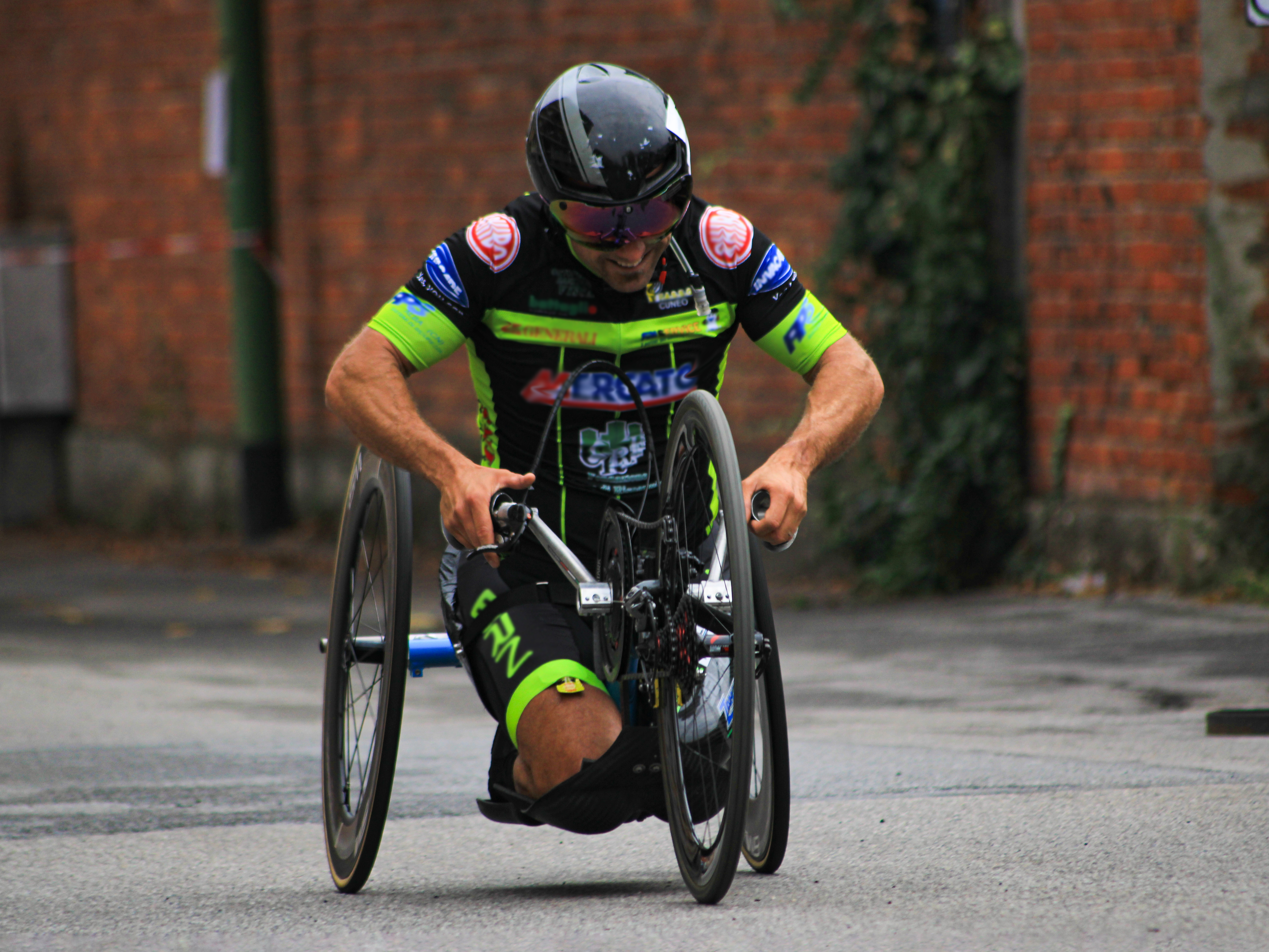
- Colombari in 2019.

Personal information
- Born: 29 March 1982 (age 44) Turin, Italy

Sport
- Country: Italy
- Sport: Para cycling
- Disability: Limb deficiency
- Disability class: H5
Medal record
Men's para-cycling
Representing Italy
Paralympic Games
Gold medal – first place	2020 Tokyo	Mixed team relay H1–5
European Championships
Gold medal – first place	2023 Rotterdam	Mixed team relay H1–H5

Diego Colombari (born 29 March 1982) is an Italian paralympic cyclist who won a gold medal at the 2020 Summer Paralympics.
