= Luis Miguel García-Marquina =

Spanish para-cyclist (born 1979)

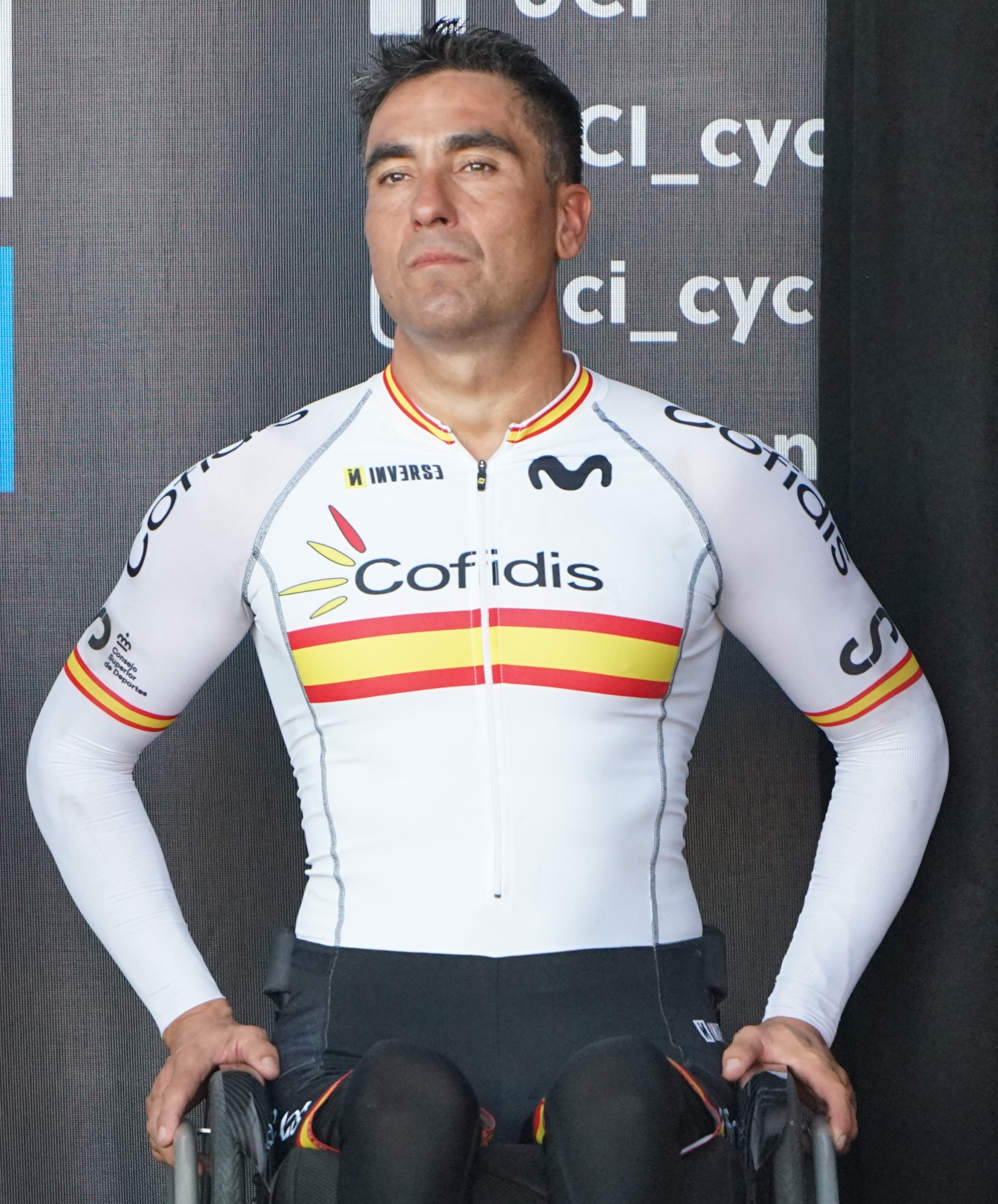
- García-Marquina at the 2024 UCI Para-cycling Road World Championships

Personal information
- Full name: Luis Miguel García-Marquina Cascallana
- Nationality: Spanish
- Born: 28 July 1979 (age 46) Jerez de la Frontera, Spain

Sport
- Sport: Para-cycling
- Disability class: H3
Medal record
Men's para-cycling
Representing Spain
Paralympic Games
Bronze medal – third place	2020 Tokyo	Road time trial H3
Road World Championships
Silver medal – second place	2021 Cascais	Mixed team relay H1-5
Bronze medal – third place	2019 Emmen	Road race H3
Bronze medal – third place	2024 Zurich	Mixed team relay H1–5

Luis Miguel García-Marquina Cascallana (Note: In this Spanish name, the first or paternal surname is García-Marquina and the second or maternal family name is Cascallana.) (born 28 July 1979) is a Spanish Para-cyclist who represented Spain at the 2020 Summer Paralympics.

== Career ==
García-Marquina represented Spain in the men's time trial H3 event at the 2020 Summer Paralympics and won a bronze medal.
