= Tim de Vries =

Dutch para-cyclist (born 1978)

Personal information
- Nationality: Dutch
- Born: 10 August 1978 (age 47)

Sport
- Sport: Para-cycling
- Disability class: H5
Medal record
Men's Para-cycling
Representing Netherlands
Paralympic Games
Bronze medal – third place	2020 Tokyo	Road race H5
Road World Championships
Gold medal – first place	2019 Emmen	Road race (H5)
Gold medal – first place	2018 Maniago	Road race (H5)
Gold medal – first place	2017 Pietermaritzburg	Road race (H5)
Silver medal – second place	2019 Emmen	Time trial (H5)
Silver medal – second place	2018 Maniago	Time trial (H5)
Silver medal – second place	2017 Pietermaritzburg	Time trial (H5)
Silver medal – second place	2023 Glasgow	Time trial (H5)
Silver medal – second place	2023 Glasgow	Road race (H5)
Bronze medal – third place	2021 Cascais	Road race (H5)
Bronze medal – third place	2014 Greenville	Road race (H5)
Bronze medal – third place	2014 Greenville	Time trial (H5)
Bronze medal – third place	2013 Baie-Comeau	Time trial (H4)
Bronze medal – third place	2022 Baie-Comeau	Road race (H5)
Bronze medal – third place	2024 Zurich	Time trial (H5)
Bronze medal – third place	2025 Ronse	Time trial (H5)
Bronze medal – third place	2025 Ronse	Road race (H5)
European Championships
Gold medal – first place	2023 Rotterdam	Road race (H5)
Bronze medal – third place	2023 Rotterdam	Time trial (H5)

Tim de Vries (born 10 August 1978) is a Dutch Para-cyclist. He represented the Netherlands in the 2016 and 2020 Summer Paralympics.

== Career ==
De Vries represented the Netherlands in the 2016 and 2020 Summer Paralympics. In the latter, he won the bronze medal in the men's road race H5 event.
