= Italy at the 2024 Summer Paralympics =

- Flag of Italy
- IPC code: ITA
- NPC: Italian Paralympic Committee
- Website: Official website

in Paris, France August 28, 2024 – September 8, 2024
- Competitors: 141 in 17 sports
- Flag bearers (opening): Luca Mazzone; Ambra Sabatini
- Flag bearers (closing): Domiziana Mecenate; Ndiaga Dieng
- Medals Ranked 6th: Gold 24 Silver 15 Bronze 32 Total 71

Summer Paralympics appearances (overview)
- 1960; 1964; 1968; 1972; 1976; 1980; 1984; 1988; 1992; 1996; 2000; 2004; 2008; 2012; 2016; 2020; 2024

Italy competed at the 2024 Summer Paralympics in Paris, France, from 28 August to 8 September.

== Medalists ==
Medal	Athlete/s	Sport	Event	Date
Gold	Carlotta Gilli	Swimming	Women's 100 metre butterfly S13	29 August
Gold	Francesco Bocciardo	Swimming	Men's 200 metre freestyle S5	29 August
Gold	Stefano Raimondi	Swimming	Men's 100 metre breaststroke SB9	30 August
Gold	Stefano Raimondi	Swimming	Men's 100 metre freestyle S10	1 September
Gold	Rigivan Ganeshamoorthy	Athletics	Men's discus throw F52	1 September
Gold	Federico Bicelli	Swimming	Men's 400 metre freestyle S7	2 September
Gold	Simone Barlaam	Swimming	Men's 50 metre freestyle S9	2 September
Gold	Giulia Ghiretti	Swimming	Women's 100 m breaststroke SB4	2 September
Gold	Carlotta Gilli	Swimming	Women's 200 m individual medley SM13	3 September
Gold	Stefano Raimondi	Swimming	Men's 100 m butterfly S10	3 September
Gold	Fabrizio Cornegliani	Cycling	Men's road time trial H1	4 September
Gold	Alberto Amodeo	Swimming	Men's 400 metre freestyle S8	4 September
Gold	Monica Boggioni	Swimming	Women's 50 metre breaststroke SB3	4 September
Gold	Oney Tapia	Athletics	Men's discus throw F11	5 September
Gold	Antonio Fantin	Swimming	Men's 100 metre freestyle S6	5 September
Gold	Stefano Travisani; Elisabetta Mijno	Archery	Mixed team recurve	5 September
Gold	Assunta Legnante	Athletics	Women's shot put F11	6 September
Gold	Matteo Parenzan	Table tennis	Men's individual - Class 6	6 September
Gold	Giada Rossi	Table tennis	Women's individual – Class 1–2	6 September
Gold	Simone Barlaam	Swimming	Men's 100 metre butterfly S9	6 September
Gold	Stefano Raimondi	Swimming	Men's 200 metre individual medley SM10	7 September
Gold	Alberto Amodeo	Swimming	Men's 100 metre butterfly S8	7 September
Gold	Stefano Raimondi; Xenia Francesca Palazzo; Giulia Terzi; Simone Barlaam	Swimming	Mixed 4 × 100 metre freestyle 34 pts	7 September
Gold	Martina Caironi	Athletics	Women's 100 metres T63	7 September
Silver	Simone Barlaam	Swimming	Men's 400 metre freestyle S9	29 August
Silver	Efrem Morelli	Swimming	Men's 50 metre breaststroke SB3	29 August
Silver	Carlotta Gilli	Swimming	Women's 400 metre freestyle S13	31 August
Silver	Francesco Bettella	Swimming	Men's 50 metre backstroke S1	31 August
Silver	Veronica Yoko Plebani	Paratriathlon	Women's PTS2	2 September
Silver	Francesca Tarantello; Guide: Silvia Visaggi	Paratriathlon	Women's PTVI	2 September
Silver	Maxcel Amo Manu	Athletics	Men's 100 metres T61	2 September
Silver	Assunta Legnante	Athletics	Women's discus throw F11	3 September
Silver	Luca Mazzone	Cycling	Men's road time trial H2	4 September
Silver	Matteo Betti	Wheelchair fencing	Men's foil A	4 September
Silver	Martina Caironi	Athletics	Women's long jump T63	5 September
Silver	Antonio Fantin	Swimming	Men's 400 metre freestyle S6	6 September
Silver	Stefano Raimondi	Swimming	Men's 100 metre backstroke S10	6 September
Silver	Sara Morganti	Equestrian	Individual freestyle test grade I	7 September
Silver	Luca Mazzone; Federico Mestroni; Mirko Testa	Cycling	Mixed team relay H1-5	7 September
Bronze	Lorenzo Bernard; Pilot: Davide Plebani	Cycling	Men's individual pursuit B	29 August
Bronze	Vittoria Bianco	Swimming	Women's 400 metre freestyle S9	29 August
Bronze	Angela Procida	Swimming	Women's 100 metre backstroke S2	29 August
Bronze	Francesco Bettella	Swimming	Men's 100 metre backstroke S1	29 August
Bronze	Monica Boggioni	Swimming	Women's 200 metre freestyle S5	29 August
Bronze	Monica Boggioni	Swimming	Women's 100 metre freestyle S5	30 August
Bronze	Carlotta Gilli	Swimming	Women's 100 metre backstroke S13	30 August
Bronze	Antonino Bossolo	Taekwondo	Men's 63 kg	30 August
Bronze	Alessia Scortechini	Swimming	Women's 100 metre freestyle S10	1 September
Bronze	Paolo Tonon; Daila Dameno	Archery	Mixed team W1	2 September
Bronze	Giulia Terzi	Swimming	Women's 400 metre freestyle S7	2 September
Bronze	Carlotta Gilli	Swimming	Women's 50 metre freestyle S13	2 September
Bronze	Manuel Mateo Bortuzzo	Swimming	Men's 100 metre breaststroke SB4	2 September
Bronze	Sara Morganti	Equestrian	Individual championship test grade I	3 September
Bronze	Federico Bicelli	Swimming	Men's 100 metre backstroke S7	3 September
Bronze	Elisabetta Mijno	Archery	Women's individual recurve open	3 September
Bronze	Edoardo Giordan	Wheelchair fencing	Men's sabre A	3 September
Bronze	Davide Franceschetti	Shooting	P4 Mixed 50 metre pistol SH1	4 September
Bronze	Martino Pini	Cycling	Men's road time trial H3	4 September
Bronze	Xenia Palazzo	Swimming	Women's 400 metre freestyle S8	4 September
Bronze	Beatrice Vio	Wheelchair fencing	Women's foil B	4 September
Bronze	Giulia Terzi	Swimming	Women's 100 metre freestyle S7	4 September
Bronze	Federico Falco	Table tennis	Men's individual – Class 1	4 September
Bronze	Luca Mazzone	Cycling	Men's road race H1-2	5 September
Bronze	Ana Maria Vitelaru	Cycling	Women's road race H5	5 September
Bronze	Mirko Testa	Cycling	Men's road race H3	5 September
Bronze	Beatrice Vio; Loredana Trigilia; Andreea Mogoș; Rossana Pasquino	Wheelchair fencing	Women's foil team	5 September
Bronze	Carlotta Ragazzini	Table tennis	Women's individual – Class 3	6 September
Bronze	Donato Telesca	Powerlifting	Men's 72 kg	6 September
Bronze	Alberto Amodeo	Swimming	Men's 100 m freestyle S8	6 September
Bronze	Giulia Terzi	Swimming	Women's 50 m butterfly S7	7 September
Bronze	Monica Contrafatto	Athletics	Women's 100 metres T63	7 September

Medals by sport
Sport	1st place, gold medalist(s)	2nd place, silver medalist(s)	3rd place, bronze medalist(s)	Total
Swimming	16	6	15	37
Athletics	4	3	1	8
Table tennis	2	0	2	4
Cycling	1	2	5	8
Archery	1	0	2	3
Paratriathlon	0	2	0	2
Wheelchair fencing	0	1	3	4
Equestrian	0	1	1	2
Powerlifting	0	0	1	1
Shooting	0	0	1	1
Taekwondo	0	0	1	1
Total	24	15	32	71

Medals by date
Day	Date	1st place, gold medalist(s)	2nd place, silver medalist(s)	3rd place, bronze medalist(s)	Total
1	29 August	2	2	5	9
2	30 August	1	0	3	4
3	31 August	0	2	0	2
4	1 September	2	0	1	3
5	2 September	3	3	4	10
6	3 September	2	1	4	7
7	4 September	3	2	6	11
8	5 September	3	1	4	8
9	6 September	4	2	3	9
10	7 September	4	2	2	8
11	8 September	0	0	0	0
Total		24	15	32	71

== Competitors ==
The following is the list of number of competitors in the Games.

Sport	Men	Women	Total
Archery	3	6	9
Athletics	9	7	16
Badminton	0	1	1
Cycling	10	6	16
Equestrian	0	4	4
Judo	3	2	5
Paracanoeing	5	3	8
Paratriathlon	3	5	8
Powerlifting	1	2	3
Rowing	4	2	6
Shooting	4	2	6
Sitting volleyball	0	12	12
Swimming	16	12	28
Table tennis	4	3	7
Taekwondo	1	0	1
Wheelchair fencing	6	4	10
Wheelchair tennis	1	0	1
Total	70	71	141

== Archery ==
Italy entered nine athletes into the games. Six of them qualified by virtue of their result at the 2023 World Para Archery Championships in Plzeň, Czech Republic, meanwhile the other qualified through 2023 European Para Championships in Rotterdam, Netherlands; and through 2024 World Qualification Tournament in Dubai, United Arab Emirates.

Men

Athlete	Event	Ranking Round		Round of 32	Round of 16	Quarterfinals	Semifinals	Finals	
Athlete	Event	Score	Seed	Opposition Score	Opposition Score	Opposition Score	Opposition Score	Opposition Score	Rank
Paolo Tonon	Individual W1	652	7	—N/a	Antonios (FIN); W 132-130	Hekimoğlu (TUR); W 138-134	Tabansky (USA); L 115-136	Zhang (CHN); L 126-138	4
Matteo Bonacina	Individual compound	691	11	Nori (IRI); L 139-141	Did not advance				17
Stefano Travisani	Individual recurve	627	11	—N/a	Ueyama (JPN); L 2-6	Did not advance			9

Women

Athlete	Event	Ranking Round		Round of 32	Round of 16	Quarterfinals	Semifinals	Finals	
Athlete	Event	Score	Seed	Opposition Score	Opposition Score	Opposition Score	Opposition Score	Opposition Score	Rank
Daila Dameno	Individual W1	609	5	—N/a	Bye	Brandtlová (CZE); L 117-127	Did not advance		7
Asia Pellizzari	Individual W1	607	8	—N/a	Mısır (TUR); L 112-118	Did not advance			9
Giulia Pesci	Individual compound	644	25	Sarti (ITA); L 126-136	Did not advance				17
Eleonora Sarti	Individual compound	684	8	Pesci (ITA); W 136-126	Adhana (IND); L 135–141	Did not advance			9
Veronica Floreno	Individual recurve	552	15	Buyanjargal (MGL); L 0-6	Did not advance				17
Elisabetta Mijno	Individual recurve	641	1	—N/a	Jennings (AUS); W 6-0	Olszewska (POL); W 6-0	Wu (CHN); L 4-6	Demberel (MGL); W 6-2	3rd place, bronze medalist(s)

Mixed

Athlete	Event	Ranking Round		Round of 16	Quarterfinals	Semifinals	Finals	
Athlete	Event	Score	Seed	Opposition Score	Opposition Score	Opposition Score	Opposition Score	Rank
Paolo Tonon; Daila Dameno	Team W1	1261	3	—N/a	Tabansky /Otto (USA); W 139-126	Drahoninsky /Musilova (CZE); L 138-146	Park /Kim (KOR); W 134-132	3rd place, bronze medalist(s)
Matteo Bonacina; Eleonora Sarti	Team compound	1375	6	Govinda Rajan /Abdul Jalil (MAL); W 147-141	Zhou /Ai (CHN); W 151*-151	McQueen /Grinham (GBR); L 149-156	Kumar /Devi (IND); L 155-156	4
Stefano Travisani; Elisabetta Mijno	Team recurve	1268	1	Bye	Wulandari /Setiawan (INA); W 5-3	Singh /Pooja (IND); W 6-2	Savaş /Eroğlu (TUR); W 6-2	1st place, gold medalist(s)

== Athletics ==
Italian track and field athletes achieved quota places for the following events based on their results at the 2023 World Championships, 2024 World Championships, or through high performance allocation, as long as they meet the minimum entry standard (MES).

Key

- Note–Ranks given for track events are within the athlete's heat only
- Q = Qualified for the next round
- q = Qualified for the next round as a fastest loser or, in field events, by position without achieving the qualifying target
- DQ = Disqualified
- PR = Paralympic Record
- AR = Area (or continental) Record
- NR = National Record
- SB = Season's Best
- N/A = Round not applicable for the event
- Bye = Athlete not required to compete in round

Track & road events
Men

Athlete	Event	Heat		Final	
Athlete	Event	Result	Rank	Result	Rank
Marco Cicchetti	100 metres T44	—N/a		12.03	8
Alessandro Ossola	100 metres T63	12.46	5	Did not advance	
Fabio Bottazzini	100 metres T64	11.76	8	Did not advance	
Fabio Bottazzini	200 metres T64	23.97	6	Did not advance	
Maxcel Amo Manu	100 metres T64	10.69	1 Q	10.76	2nd place, silver medalist(s)
Maxcel Amo Manu	200 metres T64	DQ		Did not advance	
Riccardo Bagaini	400 metres T47	49.97	5	Did not advance	
Ndiaga Dieng	1500 metres T20	—N/a		3:50.24	4

Women

Athlete	Event	Heat		Semifinal		Final	
Athlete	Event	Result	Rank	Result	Rank	Result	Rank
Arjola Dedaj; Guide: Alessandro Galbiati	100 metres T11	13.13	3	Did not advance			
Valentina Petrillo	200 metres T12	25.95	3 q	25.92	3	Did not advance	
Valentina Petrillo	400 metres T12	58.35	2 q	57.58	3	Did not advance	
Martina Caironi	100 metres T63	14.31	1 Q	—N/a		14.16	1st place, gold medalist(s)
Monica Contrafatto	100 metres T63	14.33	1 Q	—N/a		14.60	3rd place, bronze medalist(s)
Ambra Sabatini	100 metres T63	14.33	2 Q	—N/a		DNF	
Giuliana Chiara Filippi	100 metres T64	13.73	7	Did not advance			

Field events

Athlete	Event	Final	
Athlete	Event	Distance	Position
Oney Tapia	Men's shot put F11	12.12	7
Oney Tapia	Men's discus throw F11	41.92	1st place, gold medalist(s)
Marco Cicchetti	Men's long jump F44	6.63	8
Rigivan Ganeshamoorthy	Men's discus throw F52	27.06	1st place, gold medalist(s)
Arjola Dedaj	Women's long jump T11	4.75	4
Assunta Legnante	Women's shot put F11	14.54	1st place, gold medalist(s)
Assunta Legnante	Women's discus throw F11	38.01	2nd place, silver medalist(s)
Martina Caironi	Women's long jump F63	5.06	2nd place, silver medalist(s)
Giuliana Chiara Filippi	Women's long jump F64	4.54	9

== Badminton ==
Athlete	Event	Group stage			Elimination	Quarter-final	Semi-final	Final / BM	
Athlete	Event	Opposition Score	Opposition Score	Rank	Opposition Score	Opposition Score	Opposition Score	Opposition Score	Rank
Rosa De Marco	Women's singles SU5	Murugesan (IND); L 0-2	Monteiro (POR); L 0-2	3	Did not advance				7

== Cycling ==
Italy entered two para-cyclists (one in each gender) after finished the top eligible nation's at the 2022 UCI Nation's ranking allocation ranking.

=== Road ===
Men

Athlete	Event	Time	Rank
Federico Andreoli; Pilot: Paolo Totò	Men's road race B	3:03:49	6
Federico Andreoli; Pilot: Paolo Totò	Men's time trial B	35:36.79	6
Lorenzo Bernard; Pilot: Davide Plebani	Men's road race B	2:59:38	5
Lorenzo Bernard; Pilot: Davide Plebani	Men's time trial B	36:58.15	9
Fabrizio Cornegliani	Men's road race H1-2	DNF	
Fabrizio Cornegliani	Men's time trial H1	34:50.45	1st place, gold medalist(s)
Luca Mazzone	Men's road race H1-2	1:27:58	3rd place, bronze medalist(s)
Luca Mazzone	Men's time trial H2	25:18.83	2nd place, silver medalist(s)
Federico Mestroni	Men's road race H3	DNF	
Federico Mestroni	Men's time trial H3	48:33.04	8
Martino Pini	Men's road race H3	1:39:39	5
Martino Pini	Men's time trial H3	46:13.69	3rd place, bronze medalist(s)
Mirko Testa	Men's road race H3	1:39:38	3rd place, bronze medalist(s)
Mirko Testa	Men's time trial H3	49:05.30	9
Giorgio Farroni	Men's road race T1-2	1:29:49	8
Giorgio Farroni	Men's time trial T1-2	24:03.51	4
Federico Mestroni; Martino Pini; Mirko Testa	Mixed team relay H1–5	25:16	2nd place, silver medalist(s)

Women

Athlete	Event	Time	Rank
Katia Aere	Women's road race H5	1:59:01	5
Katia Aere	Women's time trial H4-5	28:40.43	12
Claudia Cretti	Women's road race C4-5	2:01:21	10
Claudia Cretti	Women's time trial C5	23:23.93	8
Eleonora Mele	Women's road race C4-5	2:00:49	8
Eleonora Mele	Women's time trial C5	22:27.90	6
Francesca Porcellato	Women's road race H1-2-3-4	56:19	4
Francesca Porcellato	Women's time trial H1-2-3	27:13.50	6
Giulia Ruffato	Women's road race H1-2-3-4	1:00:34	12
Giulia Ruffato	Women's time trial H4-5	27:07.35	7
Ana Maria Vitelaru	Women's road race H5	1:52:27	3rd place, bronze medalist(s)
Ana Maria Vitelaru	Women's time trial H4-5	26:16.93	5

=== Track ===
Men

Athlete	Event	Qualification		Final	
Athlete	Event	Result	Rank	Result	Rank
Lorenzo Bernard; Pilot: Davide Plebani	Men's time trial B	1:03.744	7	Did not advance	
Lorenzo Bernard; Pilot: Davide Plebani	Men's pursuit B	4:02.558	3 QB	4:04.613	3rd place, bronze medalist(s)

Women

Athlete	Event	Qualification		Final	
Athlete	Event	Result	Rank	Result	Rank
Claudia Cretti	Women's time trial C4-5	38.929	9	Did not advance	
Claudia Cretti	Women's pursuit C5	3:38.869	4 QB	3:43.774	4

Qualification Legend: QB=Final Bronze medal; QG=Final Gold medal; QF=Final

== Equestrian ==
Italy entered a full squad of four para-equestrians into the Paralympic equestrian competition by finishing the top seven nation's at the 2022 FEI World Championships in Herning, Denmark.

Individual

Athlete	Horse	Event	Total	
Athlete	Horse	Event	Score	Rank
Sara Morganti	Mariebelle	Individual championship test grade I	74.625	3rd place, bronze medalist(s)
Sara Morganti	Mariebelle	Individual freestyle test grade I	80.694	2nd place, silver medalist(s)
Federica Sileoni	Leonardo	Individual championship test grade V	68.205	10
Federica Sileoni	Leonardo	Individual freestyle test grade V	Did not advance	
Carola Semperboni	Paul	Individual championship test grade I	71.708	7
Carola Semperboni	Paul	Individual freestyle test grade I	74.554	6
Francesca Salvadè	Escari	Individual championship test grade III	71.566	4
Francesca Salvadè	Escari	Individual freestyle test grade III	75.820	5

Team

Athlete	Horse	Event	Individual score	Total	
Athlete	Horse	Event	TT	Score	Rank
Sara Morganti	See above	Team	79.458	223.166	4
Carola Semperboni	See above	Team	70.708	223.166	4
Francesca Salvadè	See above	Team	73.000	223.166	4

== Judo ==
Athlete	Event	Round of 16	Quarterfinals	Semifinals	Repechage	Repechage Final	Final / BM	
Athlete	Event	Opposition Result	Opposition Result	Opposition Result	Opposition Result	Opposition Result	Opposition Result	Rank
Dongdong Camanni	Men's 73 Kg J1	Pereira (BRA); L 1-10	—N/a		Gauto (ARG); W 10-0	Mamedov (UZB); L 0-10	Did not advance	
Valerio Romano Teodori	Men's 90 Kg J1	Batkhuyag (MGL); W 10-0	Çimciler (TUR); L 0-10	—N/a		Abdiev (UZB); L 0-10	Did not advance	
Simone Cannizzaro	Men's 90 Kg J2	—N/a	Nazarenko (UKR); L 0-11	—N/a		Goral (GER); W 10-1	Casanova (BRA); L 0-1	5
Matilde Lauria	Women's 70 kg J1	—N/a	Paschalidou (GRE); L 0-10	—N/a		Uslu Hajabipour (TUR); L 0-10	Did not advance	
Carolina Costa	Women's +70 kg J2	—N/a	Lézé (FRA); W 10-0	Silva (BRA); L 10-1	—N/a		Raifova (KAZ); L 10-0	5

== Paracanoeing ==
Italy earned quota places for the following events through the 2023 ICF Canoe Sprint World Championships in Duisburg, Germany; and 2024 ICF Canoe Sprint World Championships in Szeged, Hungary.

Men

Athlete	Event	Heats		Semifinal		Final	
Athlete	Event	Time	Rank	Time	Rank	Time	Rank
Esteban Gabriel Farias	KL1	52.42	3 SF	56.99	3 FA	51.29	7
Christian Volpi	KL2	45.42	3 SF	44.31	3 FA	43.21	7
Kwadzo Klokpah	KL3	45.42	5 SF	44.02	8	Did not advance	
Marius Bogdan Ciustea	VL2	59.49	5 SF	58.15	4	Did not advance	
Mirko Nicoli	VL3	51.37	4 SF	52.17	5 FB	53.82	11

Women

Athlete	Event	Heats		Semifinal		Final	
Athlete	Event	Time	Rank	Time	Rank	Time	Rank
Eleonora De Paolis	KL1	1:00.94	3 SF	1:04.03	3 FA	1:01.56	8
Amanda Embriaco	KL3	51.97	4 SF	49.94	3 FA	50.49	7
Veronica Silvia Biglia	VL2	1:07.82	4 SF	1:06.62	3 FA	1:04.94	6

Qualification Legend: FA=Final A (medal); FB=Final B (non-medal); SF=Semifinal

== Paratriathlon ==
Men

Athlete	Class	Swim	T1	Bike	T2	Run	Time	Rank
Giovanni Achenza	Men's PTWC	12:54	1:07	35:49	0:39	13:20	1:03:49	5
Giuseppe Romele	Men's PTWC	11:31	1:23	35:21	0:36	13:34	1:02:25	DSQ
Gianluca Valori	Men's PTS2	17:37	2:25	36:01	0:26	23:10	1:19:39	8

Women

Athlete	Class	Swim	T1	Bike	T2	Run	Time	Rank
Francesca Tarantello; Guide: Silvia Visaggi	Women's PTVI	14:19	1:00	31:28	0:39	19:17	1:06:43	2nd place, silver medalist(s)
Anna Barbaro; Guide: Charlotte Bonin	Women's PTVI	12:46	1:27	33:44	0:48	23:16	1:12:01	10
Veronica Yoko Plebani	Women's PTS2	13:12	1:43	37:47	0:59	21:56	1:15:37	2nd place, silver medalist(s)

== Powerlifting ==
Athlete	Event	Attempts (kg)				Result (kg)	Rank
Athlete	Event	1	2	3	4	Result (kg)	Rank
Donato Telesca	Men's 72 kg	209	213^{LC}	~~215^{LC}~~	–	213	3rd place, bronze medalist(s)
Andrea Maria Quarto	Men's 97 kg	~~208^{LC}~~	208	~~219~~	–	208	8
Emanuela Romano	Women's 55 kg	92	96	~~99~~	–	96	6

== Rowing ==
Italian rowers qualified boats in each of the following classes at the 2023 World Rowing Championships in Belgrade, Serbia; and 2024 Final Paralympic Qualification Regatta in Lucerne, Switzerland.

Athlete	Event	Heats		Repechage		Final	
Athlete	Event	Time	Rank	Time	Rank	Time	Rank
Giacomo Perini	PR1 men's single sculls	9:08.50	2 R	9:24.49	2 FA	DSQ	
Marco Frank; Carolina Foresti; Tommaso Schettino; Greta Elisabeth Muti; Cox: Enrico D'Aniello	PR3 mixed coxed four	7:07.90	3 R	6:57.28	2 FA	7:15.63	6

Qualification Legend: FA=Final A (medal); FB=Final B (non-medal); R=Repechage

== Shooting ==
Italy entered six para-shooter's after achieved quota places for the following events by virtue of their best finishes at the 2022, 2023 and 2024 world cup, 2022 World Championships, 2023 World Championships, 2023 European Para Championships and 2024 European Championships, as long as they obtained a minimum qualifying score (MQS) by July 15, 2024.

Men

Athlete	Event	Qualification		Final	
Athlete	Event	Points	Rank	Points	Rank
Davide Franceschetti	P1 – 10 m air pistol SH1	553-7x	20	Did not advance	

Mixed

Athlete	Event	Qualification		Final	
Athlete	Event	Points	Rank	Points	Rank
Livia Cecagallina	R4 – 10 m air rifle standing SH2	630.4	13	Did not advance	
Roberto Lazzaro	R4 – 10 m air rifle standing SH2	632.1	4 Q	166.3	6
Roberto Lazzaro	R5 – 10 m air rifle prone SH2	636.9	5 Q	124.7	8
Pamela Novaglio	R9 – 50 m rifle prone SH2	610.5	24	Did not advance	
Andrea Liverani	R9 – 50 m rifle prone SH2	620.0	12	Did not advance	
Gianluca Iacus	R5 – 10 m air rifle prone SH2	634.8	14	Did not advance	
Davide Franceschetti	P4 – 50 m pistol SH1	534-5x	6 Q	199.7	3rd place, bronze medalist(s)

== Sitting volleyball ==
Italy women's national team qualified for the Paralympic Games by virtue of their gold medal at their home 2023 Sitting Volleyball European Championships in Caorle, Italy.

Roster

Head Coach: Amauri Ribeiro

- Giulia Aringhieri
- Flavia Barigelli
- Raffaela Battaglia
- Giulia Bellandi
- Silvia Biasi
- Francesca Bosio
- Eva Ceccatelli
- Sara Cirelli
- Sara Desini
- Alessandra Moggio
- Roberta Pedrelli
- Elisa Spediacci

Summary

Team	Event	Group Stage				Semifinal	Final / BM	
Team	Event	Opposition Score	Opposition Score	Opposition Score	Rank	Opposition Score	Opposition Score	Rank
Italy women's	Women's tournament	France; W 3-0	China; L 0-3	United States; L 0-3	3	—N/a	Classification final Slovenia; W 3-0	5

== Swimming ==
Italy secured fifteen quotas at the 2023 World Para Swimming Championships after finishing in the top two places in Paralympic class disciplines.

Men

Athlete	Event	Heats		Final	
Athlete	Event	Result	Rank	Result	Rank
Alberto Amodeo	100 m freestyle S8	59.17	3 Q	58.30	3rd place, bronze medalist(s)
Alberto Amodeo	400 m freestyle S8	4:33.12	5 Q	4:23.23	1st place, gold medalist(s)
Alberto Amodeo	100 m butterfly S8	1:04.48	1 Q	1:02.35	1st place, gold medalist(s)
Simone Barlaam	50 m freestyle S9	24.24	1 Q	23.90	1st place, gold medalist(s)
Simone Barlaam	100 m freestyle S10	53.89	5 Q	52.43	5
Simone Barlaam	400 m freestyle S9	4:26.30	6 Q	4:14.16	2nd place, silver medalist(s)
Simone Barlaam	100 m butterfly S9	1:00.17	1 Q	57.99	1st place, gold medalist(s)
Simone Barlaam	100 m backstroke S9	1:04.81	7 Q	1:03.76	6
Luigi Beggiato	50 m freestyle S4	39.50	6 Q	40.03	6
Luigi Beggiato	100 m freestyle S4	1:24.11	5 Q	1:24.38	8
Luigi Beggiato	200 m freestyle S4	3:02.88	5 Q	3:00.90	7
Francesco Bettella	50 m backstroke S1	—N/a		1:13.90	2nd place, silver medalist(s)
Francesco Bettella	100 m backstroke S1	—N/a		2:33.82	3rd place, bronze medalist(s)
Federico Bicelli	50 m freestyle S7	29.13	6 Q	28.53	5
Federico Bicelli	400 m freestyle S7	5:06.51	4 Q	4:38.70	1st place, gold medalist(s)
Federico Bicelli	100 m backstroke S7	1:14.37	3 Q	1:12.23	3rd place, bronze medalist(s)
Francesco Bocciardo	50 m freestyle S5	34.15	7 Q	34.38	8
Francesco Bocciardo	100 m freestyle S5	1:12.27	3 Q	1:10.53	4
Francesco Bocciardo	200 m freestyle S5	2:33.12	1 Q	2:25.99	1st place, gold medalist(s)
Vincenzo Boni	50 m freestyle S3	51.04	7 Q	50.95	7
Vincenzo Boni	200 m freestyle S3	3:51.96	7 Q		
Vincenzo Boni	50 m backstroke S3	50.76	5 Q	50.73	4
Manuel Mateo Bortuzzo	100 m breaststroke SB4	1:43.32	3 Q	1:42.52	3rd place, bronze medalist(s)
Simone Ciulli	50 m freestyle S9	26.55	12	Did not advance	
Simone Ciulli	100 m backstroke S9	1:09.54	12	Did not advance	
Simone Ciulli	100 m butterfly S9	1:05.22	15	Did not advance	
Federico Cristiani	50 m freestyle S4	40.44	7 Q	40.72	8
Federico Cristiani	100 m freestyle S4	1:25.11	7 Q	1:22.33	4
Federico Cristiani	200 m freestyle S4	2:59.47	3 Q	2:56.85	5
Federico Cristiani	50 m backstroke S4	54.60	13	Did not advance	
Antonio Fantin	100 m freestyle S6	1:03.67	1 Q	1:03.12	1st place, gold medalist(s)
Antonio Fantin	400 m freestyle S6	5:13.05	2 Q	4:49.99	2nd place, silver medalist(s)
Antonio Fantin	100 m backstroke S6	1:19.86	7 Q	1:19.38	7
Emmanuele Marigliano	50 m freestyle S3	55.62	12	Did not advance	
Emmanuele Marigliano	200 m freestyle S3	4:07.13	11	Did not advance	
Emmanuele Marigliano	50 m breaststroke SB3	1:07.04	4 Q	1:06.95	5
Emmanuele Marigliano	150 m individual medley SM3	3:27.39	9	Did not advance	
Riccardo Menciotti	100 m butterfly S10	59.88	7 Q	58.99	5
Riccardo Menciotti	100 m backstroke S10	1:03.10	4 Q	1:01.46	4
Riccardo Menciotti	100 m breaststroke SB9	1:10.42	7 Q	1:10.26	6
Riccardo Menciotti	200 m individual medley SM10	2:18.46	5 Q	2:14.29	4
Efrem Morelli	50 m breaststroke SB3	—N/a		49.41	2nd place, silver medalist(s)
Efrem Morelli	150 m individual medley SM4	2:55.11	8 Q	2:53.61	7
Federico Morlacchi	100 m butterfly S9	1:01.64	5 Q	1:01.10	4
Federico Morlacchi	100 m breaststroke SB8	1:13.00	10	Did not advance	
Stefano Raimondi	50 m freestyle S10	23.77	2 Q	23.92	4
Stefano Raimondi	100 m freestyle S10	53.43	4 Q	51.40	1st place, gold medalist(s)
Stefano Raimondi	100 m butterfly S10	59.05	4 Q	55.02	1st place, gold medalist(s)
Stefano Raimondi	100 m backstroke S10	1:02.34	2 Q	59.29	2nd place, silver medalist(s)
Stefano Raimondi	100 m breaststroke SB9	1:08.64	4 Q	1:05.28	1st place, gold medalist(s)
Stefano Raimondi	200 m individual medley SM10	2:17.51	2 Q	2:10.24	1st place, gold medalist(s)

Women

Athlete	Event	Heats		Final	
Athlete	Event	Result	Rank	Result	Rank
Alessia Berra	50 m freestyle S13	28.97	12	Did not advance	
Alessia Berra	100 m freestyle S12	1:03.51	7 Q	1:01.84	5
Alessia Berra	100 m butterfly S13	1:07.18	9	Did not advance	
Alessia Berra	100 m breaststroke SB12	1:23.58	6 Q	1:21.29	4
Vittoria Bianco	100 m freestyle S9	1:07.08	12	Did not advance	
Vittoria Bianco	400 m freestyle S9	4:52.26	3 Q	4:47.55	3rd place, bronze medalist(s)
Monica Boggioni	100 m freestyle S5	1:23.46	3 Q	1:21.74	3rd place, bronze medalist(s)
Monica Boggioni	200 m freestyle S5	2:50.56	2 Q	2:47.96	3rd place, bronze medalist(s)
Monica Boggioni	50 m backstroke S5	46.52	9	Did not advance	
Monica Boggioni	50 m breaststroke SB3	53.70	1 Q	53.25	1st place, gold medalist(s)
Monica Boggioni	200 m individual medley SM5	3:35.39	2 Q	3:36.75	4
Giulia Ghiretti	50 m butterfly S5	47.81	6 Q	46.16	6
Giulia Ghiretti	100 m breaststroke SB5	1:52.79	3 Q	1:50.21	1st place, gold medalist(s)
Giulia Ghiretti	200 m individual medley SM5	3:47.28	6 Q	3:42.66	5
Carlotta Gilli	50 m freestyle S13	27.81	1 Q	27.60	3rd place, bronze medalist(s)
Carlotta Gilli	400 m freestyle S13	4:43.84	2 Q	4:31.83	2nd place, silver medalist(s)
Carlotta Gilli	100 m butterfly S13	1:04.19	2 Q	1:03.27	1st place, gold medalist(s)
Carlotta Gilli	100 m backstroke S13	—N/a		1:08.08	3rd place, bronze medalist(s)
Carlotta Gilli	200 m individual medley SM13	2:28.89	2 Q	2:25.33	1st place, gold medalist(s)
Domiziana Mecenate	100 m freestyle S3	2:13.46	8 Q	2:12.57	7
Domiziana Mecenate	50 m backstroke S3	1:00.89	4 Q	1:01.11	4
Xenia Francesca Palazzo	50 m freestyle S8	32.04	7 Q	31.90	6
Xenia Francesca Palazzo	400 m freestyle S8	5:11.86	5 Q	5:00.13	3rd place, bronze medalist(s)
Xenia Francesca Palazzo	100 m backstroke S8	1:20.91	6 Q	1:19.85	5
Xenia Francesca Palazzo	200 m individual medley SM8	2:49.65	5 Q	2:49.29	5
Angela Procida	50 m backstroke S2	1:08.79	3 Q	1:10.97	4
Angela Procida	100 m backstroke S2	2:26.43	3 Q	2:24.48	3rd place, bronze medalist(s)
Martina Rabbolini	400 m freestyle S11	5:50.35	11	Did not advance	
Martina Rabbolini	100 m backstroke S11	1:24.21	10	Did not advance	
Martina Rabbolini	100 m breaststroke SB11	1:32.30	7 Q	1:33.40	8
Alessia Scortechini	50 m freestyle S10	27.98	5 Q	27.70	4
Alessia Scortechini	100 m freestyle S10	1:01.85	6 Q	1:01.02	3rd place, bronze medalist(s)
Alessia Scortechini	100 m butterfly S10	1:11.64	12	Did not advance	
Arianna Talamona	400 m freestyle S6	—N/a		5:49.69	6
Arianna Talamona	100 m backstroke S6	1:35.02	8 Q	1:34.90	8
Arianna Talamona	100 m breaststroke SB5	1:47.49	4 Q	1:46.48	4
Giulia Terzi	100 m freestyle S7	1:11.83	4 Q	1:10.43	3rd place, bronze medalist(s)
Giulia Terzi	400 m freestyle S7	5:22.41	4 Q	5:12.61	3rd place, bronze medalist(s)
Giulia Terzi	50 m butterfly S7	36.64	4 Q	35.40	3rd place, bronze medalist(s)

Mixed

Athlete	Event	Heats		Final	
Athlete	Event	Result	Rank	Result	Rank
Monica Boggioni; Federico Cristiani; Manuel Mateo Bertuzzo; Giulia Terzi; Efrem Morelli; Francesco Bocciardo	4 × 50 m medley 20 pts	2:49.01	5 Q	2:44.47	6
Alberto Amodeo; Federico Morlacchi; Alessia Scortechini; Xenia Francesca Palazzo; Federico Bicelli; Stefano Raimondi	4 × 100 m medley 34 pts	4:39.35	7 Q	4:32.82	5
Vincenzo Boni; Arianna Talamona; Antonio Fantin; Monica Boggioni; Luigi Beggiato; Francesco Bocciardo	4 × 50 m freestyle 20 pts	2:39.69	5 Q	2:32.11	5
Stefano Raimondi; Giulia Terzi; Xenia Francesca Palazzo; Simone Barlaam	4 × 100 m freestyle 34 pts	—N/a		4:01.54	1st place, gold medalist(s)

== Table tennis ==
Italy entered six athletes for the Paralympic games. Matteo Parenzan and Giada Rossi qualified for the games by virtue of their gold medal results, in their respective events, at the 2023 European Para Championships held in Sheffield, Great Britain. Later on, Federico Falco, Federico Crosara, Carlotta Ragazzini and Michela Brunelli qualified for the games following the allocations of ITTF final ranking.

Athlete	Event	Round of 32	Round of 16	Quarterfinals	Semifinals	Final	
Athlete	Event	Opposition Result	Opposition Result	Opposition Result	Opposition Result	Opposition Result	Rank
Federico Falco	Men's individual C1	—N/a		Joo (KOR); W 3-2	Fernandez (CUB); L 2-3	Did not advance	3rd place, bronze medalist(s)
Andrea Borgato	Men's individual C1	—N/a		Major (HUN); L 1-3	Did not advance		
Federico Crosara	Men's individual C2	—N/a	Ludovsky (SVK); W 3-1	Czuper (POL); L 1-3	Did not advance		
Matteo Parenzan	Men's individual C6	—N/a	Hirth (AUS); W 3-0	Torres (CHI); W 3-0	Seidenfeld (USA); W 3-0	Thainiyom (THA); W 3-0	1st place, gold medalist(s)
Giada Rossi	Women's individual C1–2	—N/a	Bye	Garrone (ARG); W 3-0	Bucław (POL); W 3-2	Liu (CHN); W 3-0	1st place, gold medalist(s)
Carlotta Ragazzini	Women's individual C3	—N/a	Duman (TUR); W 3-2	Dretar Karić (CRO); W 3-0	Joon (KOR); L 1-3	Did not advance	3rd place, bronze medalist(s)
Michela Brunelli	Women's individual C3	—N/a	Xue (CHN); L 0-3	Did not advance			
Federico Crosara; Federico Falco	Men's doubles MD4	—N/a		Cha /Park (KOR); L 0-3	Did not advance		
Michela Brunelli; Giada Rossi	Women's doubles WD5	—N/a		Asayut /Bootwansirina (THA); L 1-3	Did not advance		
Federico Crosara; Carlotta Ragazzini	Mixed doubles XD7	Czuper /Bucław (POL); L 2-3	Did not advance				

== Taekwondo ==
Italy entered one athletes to compete at the Paralympics competition. Antonino Bossolo qualified for Paris 2024, by virtue of finishing within the top six in the Paralympic rankings in class 63 kg.

Athlete	Event	First round	Quarterfinals	Semifinals	Repechage 1	Final / BM	
Athlete	Event	Opposition Result	Opposition Result	Opposition Result	Opposition Result	Opposition Result	Rank
Antonino Bossolo	Men's –63 kg	Bye	Adouich (MAR); W 17-4	Ganbat (MGL); L 4-6	—N/a	Milad (ISR); W 18-13	3rd place, bronze medalist(s)

== Wheelchair fencing ==
Men

Athlete	Event	Round of 16	Quarterfinal	Semifinal	Repechage 1	Repechage 2	Repechage 3	Repechage 4	Final / BM	
Athlete	Event	Opposition Score	Opposition Score	Opposition Score	Opposition Score	Opposition Score	Opposition Score	Opposition Score	Opposition Score	Rank
Matteo Betti	Men's foil A	Lemoine (FRA); W 15-9	Nalewajek (POL); W 15-4	Akkaya (TUR); W 15-9	—N/a				Sun (CHN); L 3-15	2nd place, silver medalist(s)
Matteo Dei Rossi	Men's épée A	Yasu (JPN); W 15-5	Akkaya (TUR); L 10-15	—N/a		Schmidt (GER); W 15-11	Tian (CHN); L 13-15	Did not advance		
Matteo Dei Rossi	Men's sabre A	Kano (JPN); W 15-14	Gilliver (GBR); L 8-15	—N/a	Damasceno (BRA); W 15-4	Demchuk (UKR); L 12-15	Did not advance			
Edoardo Giordan	Men's sabre A	Zhong (CHN); W 15-6	Tian (CHN); L 6-15	—N/a		Rousell (CAN); W 15-5	Kano (JPN); W 15-4	Manko (UKR); W 15-8	Demchuk (UKR); W 15-7	3rd place, bronze medalist(s)
Emanuele Lambertini	Men's épée A	Demchuk (UKR); W 15-10	Lam-Watson (GBR); W 15-9	Sun (CHN); L 4-15	—N/a			Tian (CHN); W 15-13	Akkaya (TUR); L 13-15	4
Emanuele Lambertini	Men's foil A	Branch (USA); W 15-5	Sun (CHN); L 8-15	—N/a		Demchuk (UKR); W 15-10	Tokatlian (FRA); W 15-4	Akkaya (TUR); W 15-11	Zhong (CHN); L 6-15	4
Michele Massa	Men's épée B	Datsko (UKR); W 15-11	Coutya (GBR); L 10-15	—N/a		Naumenko (UKR); L 13-15	Did not advance			
Michele Massa	Men's foil B	Alderete (ARG); W 15-2	Serozhenko (UKR); L 13-15	—N/a		Ali (IRQ); W 15-3	Kingmanaw (THA); W 15-11	Hu (CHN); L 4-15	Did not advance	
Gianmarco Paolucci	Men's épée B	Dąbrowski (POL); L 5-15	—N/a		Peter (FRA); L 3-15	Did not advance				
Gianmarco Paolucci	Men's sabre B	Guissone (BRA); W 15-11	Dąbrowski (POL); L 4-15	—N/a	Serozhenko (UKR); L 11-15	Did not advance				
Matteo Betti; Emanuele Lambertini; Michele Massa; Gianmarco Paolucci	Men's foil team	Bye	Ukraine; W 45-39	China; L 36-45	—N/a				France; L 36-45	4
Matteo Dei Rossi; Edoardo Giordan; Emanuele Lambertini; Michele Massa	Men's épée team	Japan; W 45-34	China; L 33-45	Did not advance	—N/a				Did not advance	

Women

Athlete	Event	Round of 32	Round of 16	Quarterfinal	Semifinal	Repechage 1	Repechage 2	Repechage 3	Repechage 4	Final / BM	
Athlete	Event	Opposition Score	Opposition Score	Opposition Score	Opposition Score	Opposition Score	Opposition Score	Opposition Score	Opposition Score	Opposition Score	Rank
Andreea Mogoș	Women's foil A	Bye	Isaacson (USA); W 15-0	Rodríguez Menéndez (ESP); L 12-15	—N/a		Vide (FRA); L 8-15	Did not advance			
Andreea Mogoș	Women's sabre A	Delavoipière (FRA); W 15-11	Gu (CHN); L 2-15	—N/a		Trigilia (ITA); W 15-10	Veres (HUN); L 9-15	Did not advance			
Loredana Trigilia	Women's foil A	Bye	Morkvych (UKR); W 15-14	Yu (HKG); L 8-15	—N/a		Krajnyak (HUN); L 13-15	Did not advance			
Loredana Trigilia	Women's sabre A	Bye	Vide (FRA); L 3-15	—N/a		Mogoș (ITA); L 10-15	Did not advance				
Rossana Pasquino	Women's épée B	—N/a	Jaimez Rojas (VEN); W 15-2	Kang (CHN); L 13-15	—N/a		Pacek (POL); W 15-9	Lowthian (CAN); L 13-15	Did not advance		
Rossana Pasquino	Women's sabre B	—N/a	Bye	Fedota-Isaieva (UKR); L 8-15	—N/a	Ao (CHN); L 14-15	Did not advance				
Beatrice Vio	Women's foil B	—N/a	Bye	Doloh (UKR); W 15-2	Xiao (CHN); L 9-15	—N/a			Kang (CHN); W 15-7	Cho (KOR); W 15-2	3rd place, bronze medalist(s)
Loredana Trigilia; Andreea Mogoș; Beatrice Vio; Rossana Pasquino	Women's foil team	—N/a	Bye	United States; W 45-16	China; L 41-45	—N/a				Hong Kong; W 45-33	3rd place, bronze medalist(s)
Andreea Mogoș; Loredana Trigilia; Rossana Pasquino	Women's épée team	—N/a	Ukraine; L 38-45	Did not advance		—N/a				Did not advance	

== Wheelchair tennis ==
Men

Athlete	Event	Round of 64	Round of 32	Round of 16	Quarterfinals	Semifinals	Final / BM	
Athlete	Event	Opposition Score	Opposition Score	Opposition Score	Opposition Score	Opposition Score	Opposition Score	Rank
Luca Arca	Men's singles	Berdichevsky (ISR); L 2-6, 5-7	Did not advance					

== See also ==
- Italy at the 2024 Summer Olympics
- Italy at the Paralympics
