= Cycling at the 2024 Summer Paralympics – Road cycling =

Road Cycling at the XVII Paralympic Games
- Venue: Clichy-sous-Bois (road)
- Dates: 4 to 7 September (road)
- Competitors: 220

Road Cycling at the 2024 Summer Paralympics in Paris, France, took place at Clichy-sous-Bois from 4 to 7 September. 34 events were held over three disciplines: road race, road time trial and mixed team relay (handbikes only). Events were held on tandem bicycles for visually impaired cyclists (B), tricycles (T1-2), handbikes (H1-5) and standard bicycles (C1-5).

A number of the events were composite classification events for multiple classes. In the time trials only, such events were subject to factoring, whereby finishing times were adjusted by a standardised percentage to allow fair competition between classes.

The overall race programme was unchanged from 2021 in Tokyo.

== Qualification ==
The qualification period for road cycling started from 1 January 2022 to 30 June 2024. In order to maintain their slots, NPCs must have at least one cyclist for each allocated slot to participate in at least one of the listed cycling competitions below.

Means of qualification	Date	Venue
2023 UCI Para-Cycling Road World Cup	20–24 April 2023	(Italy) Maniago
2023 UCI Para-Cycling Road World Cup	4–7 May 2023	(Belgium) Ostend
2023 UCI Para-Cycling Road World Cup	26–29 May 2023	(United States) Hunstville, AL
2023 UCI Para-cycling Road World Championships	9–13 August 2023	(United Kingdom) Glasgow
2024 UCI Para-cycling Road World Cup	13–17 January 2024	(Australia) Adelaide
2024 UCI Para-cycling Road World Cup	TBA	
2024 UCI Para-cycling Road World Cup	TBA	

== Medal table ==
The following is the medal table for all road cycling events at the 2024 Summer Paralympics.

* Host nation (France)

Rank	NPC	Gold	Silver	Bronze	Total
1	Netherlands	8	3	3	14
2	France*	7	10	4	21
3	Great Britain	4	2	2	8
4	United States	4	1	2	7
5	Spain	2	2	1	5
6	China	2	1	1	4
7	Australia	1	3	2	6
8	Italy	1	2	4	7
9	Germany	1	1	3	5
10	Ireland	1	1	0	2
11	Denmark	1	0	1	2
11	Ukraine	1	0	1	2
13	Japan	1	0	0	1
14	Switzerland	0	3	1	4
15	Belgium	0	2	2	4
16	Austria	0	2	0	2
17	Canada	0	1	0	1
18	Colombia	0	0	2	2
18	Poland	0	0	2	2
20	Portugal	0	0	1	1
20	South Africa	0	0	1	1
20	Sweden	0	0	1	1
Totals (22 entries)		34	34	34	102

== Medalists ==
=== Men's events ===
Event	Class	Gold	Silver	Bronze
Road race	H1–2	Florian Jouanny; France	Sergio Garrote Munoz; Spain	Luca Mazzone; Italy
Road race	H3	Mathieu Bosredon; France	Johan Quaile; France	Mirko Testa; Italy
Road race	H4	Jetze Plat; Netherlands	Thomas Fruehwirth; Austria	Rafal Wilk; Poland
Road race	H5	Mitch Valize; Netherlands	Loïc Vergnaud; France	Pavlo Bal; Ukraine
Road race	C1–3	Finlay Graham; Great Britain	Thomas Peyroton-Dartet; France	Alexandre Leaute; France
Road race	C4–5	Yehor Dementyev; Ukraine	Kévin Le Cunff; France	Martin van de Pol; Netherlands
Road race	B	Tristan Bangma; Pilot: Patrick Bos; Netherlands	Vincent ter Schure; Pilot: Timo Fransen; Netherlands	Alexandre Lloveras; Pilot: Yoann Paillot; France
Road race	T1–2	Chen Jianxin; China	Dennis Connors; United States	Juan José Betancourt Quiroga; Colombia
Time trial	H1	Fabrizio Cornegliani; Italy	Maxime Hordies; Belgium	Nicolas Pieter du Preez; South Africa
Time trial	H2	Sergio Garrote Muñoz; Spain	Luca Mazzone; Italy	Florian Jouanny; France
Time trial	H3	Mathieu Bosredon; France	Johan Quaile; France	Martino Pini; Italy
Time trial	H4	Jetze Plat; Netherlands	Thomas Fruehwirth; Austria	Jonas Van de Steene; Belgium
Time trial	H5	Mitch Valize; Netherlands	Loïc Vergnaud; France	Luis Costa; Portugal
Time trial	C1	Ricardo Ten Argilés; Spain	Michael Teuber; Germany	Zbigniew Maciejewski; Poland
Time trial	C2	Alexandre Leaute; France	Ewoud Vromant; Belgium	Darren Hicks; Australia
Time trial	C3	Thomas Peyroton-Dartet; France	Eduardo Santas Asensio; Spain	Matthias Schindler; Germany
Time trial	C4	Kévin Le Cunff; France	Gatien Le Rousseau; France	Damian Ramos Sanchez; Spain
Time trial	C5	Daniel Abraham Gebru; Netherlands	Alistair Donohoe; Australia	Dorian Foulon; France
Time trial	B	Tristan Bangma; Pilot: Patrick Bos; Netherlands	Elie de Carvalho; Pilot: Mickaël Guichard; France	Vincent ter Schure; Pilot: Timo Fransen; Netherlands
Time trial	T1–2	Chen Jianxin; China	Nathan Clement; Canada	Tim Celen; Belgium

=== Women's events ===
Event	Class	Gold	Silver	Bronze
Road race	H1–4	Lauren Parker; Australia	Jennette Jansen; Netherlands	Annika Zeyen-Giles; Germany
Road race	H5	Oksana Masters; United States	Sun Bianbian; China	Ana Maria Vitelaru; Italy
Road race	C1–3	Keiko Sugiura; Japan	Flurina Rigling; Switzerland	Clara Brown; United States
Road race	C4–5	Sarah Storey; Great Britain	Heidi Gaugain; France	Paula Andrea Ossa Veloza; Colombia
Road race	B	Sophie Unwin; Pilot: Jenny Holl; Great Britain	Katie-George Dunlevy; Pilot: Linda Kelly; Ireland	Lora Fachie; Pilot: Corrine Hall; Great Britain
Road race	T1–2	Emma Lund; Denmark	Celine van Till; Switzerland	Marieke van Soest; Netherlands
Time trial	H1–3	Katerina Brim; United States	Lauren Parker; Australia	Annika Zeyen-Giles; Germany
Time trial	H4–5	Oksana Masters; United States	Chantal Haenen; Netherlands	Sun Bianbian; China
Time trial	C1–3	Maike Hausberger; Germany	Frances Brown; Great Britain	Anna Beck; Sweden
Time trial	C4	Samantha Bosco; United States	Meg Lemon; Australia	Franziska Matile-Dörig; Switzerland
Time trial	C5	Sarah Storey; Great Britain	Heidi Gaugain; France	Alana Forster; Australia
Time trial	B	Katie-George Dunlevy; Pilot: Linda Kelly; Ireland	Sophie Unwin; Pilot: Jenny Holl; Great Britain	Lora Fachie; Pilot: Corrine Hall; Great Britain
Time trial	T1–2	Marieke van Soest; Netherlands	Celine van Till; Switzerland	Emma Lund; Denmark

=== Mixed event ===
Event	Class	Gold	Silver	Bronze
Team relay	H1–5	France; Mathieu Bosredon; Florian Jouanny; Joseph Fritsch	Italy; Federico Mestroni; Luca Mazzone; Mirko Testa	United States; Travis Gaertner; Katerina Brim; Matt Tingley

== See also ==
- Cycling at the 2024 Summer Paralympics – Track cycling
- Cycling at the 2024 Summer Olympics
