= Cuba at the 2023 Parapan American Games =

- Flag of Cuba
- IPC code: CUB
- NPC: Cuban Paralympic Committee
- Website: www.paralympic.org/cuba

in Santiago, Chile 17 November 2023 – 26 November 2023
- Competitors: 52 in 10 sports
- Flag bearers: Robiel Yankiel Sol; Omara Durand
- Medals Ranked 7th: Gold 12 Silver 8 Bronze 15 Total 35

Parapan American Games appearances
- 1999; 2003; 2007; 2011; 2015; 2019; 2023

Cuba competed in the 2023 Parapan American Games in Santiago, Chile from 17 November to 26 November 2023. This was Cuba's seventh appearance at the Parapan American Games, having competed at every edition of the games since the inaugural edition in 1999.

Paralympic athletes Robiel Yankiel Sol and Omara Durand were the country's flagbearers during the opening ceremony.

== Medalists ==
The following Cuban competitors won medals at the games. In the by discipline sections below, medalists' names are bolded.

Medal	Name	Sport	Event	Date
Gold	Yunier Fernández	Table tennis	Men's singles C1	November 18
Gold	Yenigladys Suárez	Shooting	P2 Women's 10 metre air pistol SH1	November 19
Gold	Yordani Fernández	Judo	Men's +90 kg	November 20
Gold	Sheyla Hernández	Judo	Women's +70 kg	November 20
Gold	Yenigladys Suárez	Shooting	P4 Mixed 50 metre pistol SH1	November 20
Gold	Daniel Milanes	Athletics	Men's 400 metres T47	November 21
Gold	Ulicer Aguilera Cruz	Athletics	Men's javelin throw F13	November 21
Gold	Omara Durand	Athletics	Women's 200 metres T12	November 21
Gold	Robiel Yankiel Sol	Athletics	Men's long jump T47	November 23
Gold	Ever Castro Martínez	Athletics	Men's javelin throw F41	November 23
Gold	Omara Durand	Athletics	Women's 100 metres T12	November 23
Gold	Guillermo Varona	Athletics	Men's javelin throw F46	November 24
Silver	Enmanuel González Rodríguez	Powerlifting	Men's 49 kg	November 18
Silver	Pablo Ramirez Barrientos	Powerlifting	Men's 54 kg	November 19
Silver	Di Angelo Loriga	Shooting	P1 Men's 10 metre air pistol SH1	November 19
Silver	Di Angelo Loriga	Shooting	P4 Mixed 50 metre pistol SH1	November 20
Silver	Andrileydis Silot	Athletics	Men's discus throw F11	November 22
Silver	Leonardo Díaz	Athletics	Men's discus throw F56	November 23
Silver	Mitchel Suarez	Taekwondo	Men's 70 kg	November 24
Silver	Manuel Alejandro del Rosario Pargas	Badminton	Men's singles SU5	November 25
Bronze	Yosjaniel Hernández	Swimming	Men's 200 metre individual medley SM7	November 18
Bronze	Jennys García	Judo	Men's 73 kg	November 19
Bronze	José Romero	Judo	Men's 73 kg	November 19
Bronze	Leidy Rodriguez	Powerlifting	Women's 45 kg	November 19
Bronze	Lorenzo Pérez	Swimming	Men's 100 metre freestyle S6	November 19
Bronze	Ariagna Hechevarría	Judo	Women's 70 kg	November 20
Bronze	Oniger Drake Vega	Powerlifting	Men's 88 kg	November 20
Bronze	Yosjaniel Hernández	Swimming	Men's 50 metre freestyle S7	November 23
Bronze	Lilisbet Rodríguez	Taekwondo	Women's 47 kg	November 23
Bronze	Yorisan Monterey	Athletics	Men's discus throw F64	November 24
Bronze	Marco Mayor	Taekwondo	Men's 63 kg	November 24
Bronze	Pedro José Urgellés	Athletics	Men's 100 metres T12	November 25
Bronze	Raciel González	Athletics	Men's 100 metres T47	November 25
Bronze	Gerdan Fonseca	Athletics	Men's javelin throw F57	November 25
Bronze	Lidia Montes de Oca	Taekwondo	Women's +65 kg	November 25

Medals by sport/discipline
Sport	1st place, gold medalist(s)	2nd place, silver medalist(s)	3rd place, bronze medalist(s)	Total
Athletics	7	2	4	**13**
Shooting	2	2	0	**4**
Judo	2	0	3	**5**
Table tennis	1	0	0	**1**
Powerlifting	0	2	2	**4**
Taekwondo	0	1	3	**4**
Badminton	0	1	0	**1**
Swimming	0	0	3	**3**
**Total**	**12**	**8**	**15**	**35**

Medals by day
Day	1st place, gold medalist(s)	2nd place, silver medalist(s)	3rd place, bronze medalist(s)	Total
18 November	1	1	1	3
19 November	1	2	4	7
20 November	3	1	2	6
21 November	3	0	0	3
22 November	0	1	0	1
23 November	3	1	2	6
24 November	1	1	2	4
25 November	0	1	4	5
26 November	0	0	0	0
**Total**	**12**	**8**	**15**	**35**

Medals by gender
**Gender**	1st place, gold medalist(s)	2nd place, silver medalist(s)	3rd place, bronze medalist(s)	**Total**
Male	7	7	11	25
Female	4	0	4	0
Mixed	1	1	0	2
**Total**	**12**	**8**	**15**	**35**

== Competitors ==
The following is the list of number of competitors (per gender) participating at the games per sport/discipline.

Sport	Men	Women	Total
Archery	1	1	2
Athletics	13	2	15
Badminton	3	1	4
Cycling	1	0	1
Judo	5	3	8
Powerlifting	4	2	6
Shooting	2	1	3
Swimming	4	0	4
Table tennis	2	1	3
Taekwondo	4	3	7
Total	39	13	52

== Archery ==
Men

Athlete	Event	Ranking Round		Round of 16	Quarterfinals	Semifinals	Final / BM	
Athlete	Event	Score	Seed	Opposition Score	Opposition Score	Opposition Score	Opposition Score	Rank
Alex Capó	Individual recurve open	524	7	Aguirre (CHI); L 0–6	Did not advance			

Women

Athlete	Event	Ranking Round		Round of 16	Quarterfinals	Semifinals	Final / BM	
Athlete	Event	Score	Seed	Opposition Score	Opposition Score	Opposition Score	Opposition Score	Rank
Leydis Posada	Individual recurve open	416	7	—	Rocha (MEX); L 2–6	Did not advance		

Mixed

Athlete	Event	Ranking Round		Quarterfinals	Semifinals	Final / BM	
Athlete	Event	Score	Seed	Opposition Score	Opposition Score	Opposition Score	Rank
Alex Capó; Leydis Posada	Team recurve open	807	7	Mexico; L 4–5	Did not advance		

== Athletics ==
Key

- Note–Ranks given for track events are within the athlete's heat only
- Q = Qualified for the next round
- q = Qualified for the next round as a fastest loser
- N/A = Round not applicable for the event
- Bye = Athlete not required to compete in round

Men

Track events

Athlete	Event	Semifinal		Final	
Athlete	Event	Result	Rank	Result	Rank
Pedro José Urgellés	100 m T12	—		11.42	3rd place, bronze medalist(s)
Raciel González	100 m T47	10.79	2 Q	10.70	3rd place, bronze medalist(s)
Daniel Milanes	400 m T47	—		49.94	1st place, gold medalist(s)

Field events

Athlete	Event	Final	
Athlete	Event	Distance	Position
Robiel Yankiel Sol	Long jump T47	7.74	1st place, gold medalist(s)
Andrileydis Silot	Shot put F11	6.90	10
Asiel Escalona	Shot put F40/F41	6.19	5
Máximo Linares	Shot put F53/F54	6.12	4
Gerdan Fonseca	Shot put F57	11.48	6
Andrileydis Silot	Discus throw F11	33.78	2nd place, silver medalist(s)
Leonardo Díaz	Discus throw F56	37.35	2nd place, silver medalist(s)
Yorisan Monterey	Discus throw F64	38.23	3rd place, bronze medalist(s)
Ulicer Aguilera Cruz	Javelin throw F13	61.11	1st place, gold medalist(s)
Ever Castro Martínez	Javelin throw F41	35.21	1st place, gold medalist(s)
Guillermo Varona	Javelin throw F46	60.23	1st place, gold medalist(s)
Máximo Linares	Javelin throw F54	NM	
Gerdan Fonseca	Javelin throw F57	43.33	3rd place, bronze medalist(s)
Yorisan Monterey	Javelin throw F64	52.45	4

Women

Track events

Athlete	Event	Semifinal		Final	
Athlete	Event	Result	Rank	Result	Rank
Omara Durand	100 m T12	11.68	1 Q	11.65	1st place, gold medalist(s)
Omara Durand	200 m T12	23.59	1 Q	23.63	1st place, gold medalist(s)
Omara Durand	400 m T12	55.95	1 Q	DSQ	

Field events

Athlete	Event	Final	
Athlete	Event	Distance	Position
Noraivis De Las Heras	Discus throw F64	28.38	4

== Badminton ==
Men

Athlete	Event	Preliminaries				Quarterfinals	Semifinals	Final / BM	
Athlete	Event	Opposition Result	Opposition Result	Opposition Result	Rank	Opposition Result	Opposition Result	Opposition Result	Rank
Rolando Bello	Singles SL3	Vargas (PER); L 16–21, 17–21	Vinatea (PER); L 18–21, 14–21	—	3	Did not advance			
Manuel del Rosario Pargas	Singles SU5	Cadenillas (PER); W 21–17, 21–13	Oliveira (BRA); W 22–20, 21–14	—	1 Q	—	Aranguri (PER); W 18–21, 21–17, 21–16	Rodrigues (BRA); L 11–21, 17–21	2nd place, silver medalist(s)
Yoelvis Omar Dalmau	Singles SH6	Kendrick (CAN); W 21–16, 21–19	Castillo (MEX); W 21–11, 21–18	Salva (PER); L 20–22, 18–21	2 Q	Quispe (PER); L 7–21, 8–21	Did not advance		

Women

Athlete	Event	Preliminaries				Semifinals	Final / BM	
Athlete	Event	Opposition Result	Opposition Result	Opposition Result	Rank	Opposition Result	Opposition Result	Rank
Laura Beatriz Llanes	Singles SU5	Dias (BRA); L 17–21, 19–21	Arriagada (CHI); W 21–12, 21–7	Ari (PER); L 12–21, 20–22	3	Did not advance		

Mixed

Athlete	Event	Preliminaries			Semifinals	Final / BM	
Athlete	Event	Opposition Result	Opposition Result	Rank	Opposition Result	Opposition Result	Rank
Rolando Bello; Laura Beatriz Llanes	Doubles SL3–SU5	Lapointe / Meier (CAN); L 23–25, 16–21	Rodrigues / Ávila (BRA); L 6–21, 11–21	3	Did not advance		

== Cycling ==
=== Road ===
Men

Athlete	Event	Result	Rank
Jorge Luis González	Time trial C1–5	32:08.53	22
Jorge Luis González	Road race C1–3	1:29:54	12

=== Track ===
Men

Athlete	Event	Qualification		Final	
Athlete	Event	Time	Rank	Opposition Time	Rank
Jorge Luis González	Pursuit C1–3	4:19.766	11	Did not advance	
Jorge Luis González	Time trial C1–5	—		1:17.458	16

== Judo ==
Men

Athlete	Event	Round of 16	Quarterfinals	Semifinals	Repechage 1	Repechage 2	Final / BM	
Athlete	Event	Opposition Result	Opposition Result	Opposition Result	Opposition Result	Opposition Result	Opposition Result	Rank
Yonaldy González	−60 kg	Herrera (CHI); W 10–00S2	Blanco (VEN); W 10–00	Lira (BRA); L 00–10	Bye		Bronze medal final Aburto (MEX); L 00S1–10	=5
Jennys García	−73 kg	Llanos (CHI); W 10–00	Mesquita (BRA); W 10–00	Gauto (ARG); L 00S3–10	Bye		Bronze medal final Ferraro (USA); W 10–00	3rd place, bronze medalist(s)
José Romero	−73 kg	Bye	Ramírez (ARG); W 10S2–00	Pereira (BRA); L 00–11S1	Bye		Bronze medal final Mesquita (BRA); W 10S1–00	3rd place, bronze medalist(s)
Reinaldo Zamora	−90 kg	—	Goodrich (USA); L 00–10	Did not advance	—	Espinoza (VEN); L 00–10	Did not advance	
Yordani Fernández	+90 kg	—	Bye	Fernandes (BRA); W 10–00	—		Silva (BRA); W 10–00	1st place, gold medalist(s)

Women

Athlete	Event	Group round				Round of 16	Quarterfinals	Semifinals	Repechage	Final / BM	
Athlete	Event	Opposition Result	Opposition Result	Opposition Result	Rank	Opposition Result	Opposition Result	Opposition Result	Opposition Result	Opposition Result	Rank
Dainelis Calunga	−57 kg	—				Lamadrid (COL); L 00–10	Did not advance				
Ariagna Hechevarría	−70 kg	Boggiano (ARG); L 00–10	Souza (BRA); L 00–10	Almanza (CHI); W 10–00	3	—					3rd place, bronze medalist(s)
Sheyla Hernández	+70 kg	—					Davis (USA); W 11–00	Souza (BRA); W 10–01	Bye	Emmerich (BRA); W 10–00S2	1st place, gold medalist(s)

== Powerlifting ==
Men

Athlete	Event	Total lifted	Rank
Enmanuel González Rodríguez	–49 kg	149	2nd place, silver medalist(s)
Pablo Ramirez Barrientos	–54 kg	161	2nd place, silver medalist(s)
Jesus Enrique Cisneros	–72 kg	185	4
Oniger Drake Vega	–88 kg	194	3rd place, bronze medalist(s)

Women

Athlete	Event	Total lifted	Rank
Leidy Rodriguez	–45 kg	82	3rd place, bronze medalist(s)
Yaime Bongo Medina	–86 kg & +86 kg	80.0	5

Mixed

Athlete	Event	Qualification		Semifinal	Final / BM	
Athlete	Event	Result	Rank	Opposition Result	Opposition Result	Rank
Jesus Enrique Cisneros; Pablo Ramirez Barrientos; Yaime Bongo Medina	Team	318.7	1 Q	Colombia; L 335.9–339.1	Bronze medal final Brazil; L 336.4–352.8	4
Oniger Drake Vega; Enmanuel González Rodríguez; Leidy Rodriguez	Team	309.7	3	Did not advance		

== Shooting ==
Men

Athlete	Event	Qualification		Final	
Athlete	Event	Score	Rank	Score	Rank
Di Angelo Loriga	P1 – 10 m air pistol SH1	555	4 Q	226.7	2nd place, silver medalist(s)
Alexander Reyna	P1 – 10 m air pistol SH1	560	1 Q	166.6	5

Women

Athlete	Event	Qualification		Final	
Athlete	Event	Score	Rank	Score	Rank
Yenigladys Suárez	P2 – 10 m air pistol SH1	549	2 Q	225.1	1st place, gold medalist(s)

Mixed

Athlete	Event	Qualification		Final	
Athlete	Event	Score	Rank	Score	Rank
Yenigladys Suárez	P3 – 25 m pistol SH1	529	6 Q	5	6
Di Angelo Loriga	P4 – 50 m pistol SH1	515	3 Q	201.7	2nd place, silver medalist(s)
Alexander Reyna	P4 – 50 m pistol SH1	513	4 Q	127.1	6
Yenigladys Suárez	P4 – 50 m pistol SH1	508	5 Q	206.9	1st place, gold medalist(s)

== Swimming ==
Men

Athlete	Event	Heat		Final	
Athlete	Event	Time	Rank	Time	Rank
Yosjaniel Hernández	50 m freestyle S7	30.45	2 Q	29.53	3rd place, bronze medalist(s)
Yosjaniel Hernández	50 m butterfly S7	—		33.69	4
Yosjaniel Hernández	200 m individual medley SM7	—		2:51.82	3rd place, bronze medalist(s)
Yunerki Ortega	50 m freestyle S11	—		28.76	5
Yunerki Ortega	100 m breaststroke SB11	—		Did not start	
Yunerki Ortega	200 m individual medley SM11	—		Did not start	
Yasmany Izquierdo	50 m freestyle S13	—		26.90	4
Lorenzo Pérez	100 m freestyle S6	—		1:08.50	3rd place, bronze medalist(s)

== Table tennis ==
Men

Athlete	Event	Preliminaries					Quarterfinals	Semifinals	Final / BM	
Athlete	Event	Opposition Result	Opposition Result	Opposition Result	Opposition Result	Rank	Opposition Result	Opposition Result	Opposition Result	Rank
Yunier Fernández	Singles C1	Godfrey (USA); W 3–0	Eberhardt (ARG); W 3–0	Bustamante (ARG); W 3–2	Leiva (CHI); W 3–0	1	—			1st place, gold medalist(s)
Osviel Nodarse	Singles C3	Acosta (URU); L 1–3	Bienati (ARG); L 1–3	Freitas (BRA); L 0–3	—	4	Did not advance			
Yunier Fernández; Osviel Nodarse	Doubles C4	Marcião / Espíndola (BRA); L 0–3	Flores / Leiva (CHI); L 1–3	Bustamante / Eberhardt (ARG); L 2–3	—	4	—			4

Women

Athlete	Event	Preliminaries			Quarterfinals	Semifinals	Final / BM	
Athlete	Event	Opposition Result	Opposition Result	Rank	Opposition Result	Opposition Result	Opposition Result	Rank
Yanelis Zamora	Singles C1–3	Oliveira (BRA); W 3–2	Guapi (COL); W 3–0	1 Q	Sigala (MEX); L 1–3	Did not advance		

Mixed

Athlete	Event	Round of 16	Quarterfinals	Semifinals	Final / BM	
Athlete	Event	Opposition Result	Opposition Result	Opposition Result	Opposition Result	Rank
Osviel Nodarse; Yanelis Zamora	Doubles C4–7	Bye	Babes / Severo (BRA); L 0–3	Did not advance		

== Taekwondo ==
Men

Athlete	Event	Round of 16	Quarterfinals	Semifinals	Repechage	Final / BM	
Athlete	Event	Opposition Result	Opposition Result	Opposition Result	Opposition Result	Opposition Result	Rank
Manuel Benítez	−58 kg	Fernandez (ARG); L 5–19	Did not advance				
Marco Mayor	−63 kg	—	Castro (DOM); L 42–50	Did not advance	Yesquen (COL); W 37–6	Bronze medal final Novik (ARG); W 12–9	3rd place, bronze medalist(s)
Mitchel Suarez	−70 kg	Bye	Vieira (BRA); W 28–8	Coelho (BRA); W 14–9	Bye	Samorano (ARG); L 20–21	2nd place, silver medalist(s)
Dayan Sosa	+80 kg	—	Paulo (BRA); L 5–14	Did not advance	Pedroza (MEX); L 0–12	Did not advance	

Women

Athlete	Event	Quarterfinals	Semifinals	Final / BM	
Athlete	Event	Opposition Result	Opposition Result	Opposition Result	Rank
Lilisbet Rodríguez	−47 kg	Pio (BRA); W 37–6	Romero (MEX); L 1–17	Did not advance	3rd place, bronze medalist(s)
Idalianna Quintero	−65 kg	Did not start			
Lidia Montes de Oca	+65 kg	Puntriano (PER); W 10–8	Menezes (BRA); L 6–26	Did not advance	3rd place, bronze medalist(s)

== See also ==
- Cuba at the 2023 Pan American Games
- Cuba at the 2024 Summer Paralympics
