= Judo at the 2023 Parapan American Games – Men's 73 kg =

Men's 73 kg at the 2023 Parapan American Games
- Venue: Contact Sports Center
- Dates: November 19
- Competitors: 12 from 8 nations

Medalists
1st place, gold medalist(s)		Harlley Pereira	Brazil
2nd place, silver medalist(s)		Eduardo Gauto	Argentina
3rd place, bronze medalist(s)		Jennys García	Cuba
3rd place, bronze medalist(s)		José Romero	Cuba

The men's 73 kg competition of the judo events at the 2023 Parapan American Games was held on November 19 at the Contact Sports Center (Centro de Entrenamiento de los Deportes de Contacto) in Santiago, Chile. A total of 12 athletes from 8 NOC's competed.

== Results ==
=== Repechage ===
Repechage 1
Yabrán Llanos (CHI)	01
Rayfran Mesquita (BRA)	10

Repechage 2
Anthony Ferraro (USA)	10
Rodolfo Ramirez (ARG)	00
Raúl Ortiz (MEX)	00
Rayfran Mesquita (BRA)	10

Bronze metal match
Anthony Ferraro (USA)	00
Jennys García (CUB)	10
Rayfran Mesquita (BRA)	00
José Romero (CUB)	10

=== Main Bracket ===
Round of 16
Luis Pérez (PUR)	00
Anthony Ferraro (USA)	01
Antero Villalobos (PER)	00
Rodolfo Ramirez (ARG)	10
Robert Kim (USA)	00
Raúl Ortiz (MEX)	10
Yabrán Llanos (CHI)	00
Jennys García (CUB)	10

Quarterfinals
Harlley Pereira (BRA)	11
Anthony Ferraro (USA)	00
José Romero (CUB)	10
Rodolfo Ramirez (ARG)	00
Eduardo Gauto (ARG)	10
Raúl Ortiz (MEX)	00
Rayfran Mesquita (BRA)	00
Jennys García (CUB)	10

Semifinals
Harlley Pereira (BRA)	11
José Romero (CUB)	00
Eduardo Gauto (ARG)	10
Jennys García (CUB)	00

Final
Harlley Pereira (BRA)	10
Eduardo Gauto (ARG)	00
