= Judo at the 2023 Parapan American Games – Women's +70 kg =

Women's +70 kg at the 2023 Parapan American Games
- Venue: Contact Sports Center
- Dates: November 20
- Competitors: 5 from 4 nations

Medalists
1st place, gold medalist(s)		Sheyla Hernández	Cuba
2nd place, silver medalist(s)		Meg Emmerich	Brazil
3rd place, bronze medalist(s)		Katie Davis	United States
3rd place, bronze medalist(s)		Rebeca de Souza	Brazil

The women's +70 kg competition of the judo events at the 2023 Parapan American Games was held on November 20 at the Contact Sports Center (Centro de Entrenamiento de los Deportes de Contacto) in Santiago, Chile. A total of 5 athletes from 4 NOC's competed.

== Results ==
=== Repechage ===
Repechage
Christella Garcia (USA)	00
Danitza Sanabria (VEN)	11

Bronze metal match
Katie Davis (USA)	10
Mariana Mederos (URU)	00
Danitza Sanabria (VEN)	00
Rebeca de Souza (BRA)	10

=== Main Bracket ===
Quarterfinals		Semifinals		Final
		Rebeca de Souza (BRA)	01
Sheyla Hernández (CUB)	11	Sheyla Hernández (CUB)	10
Katie Davis (USA)	00			Sheyla Hernández (CUB)	10
Christella Garcia (USA)	00			Meg Emmerich (BRA)	00
Mariana Mederos (URU)	10	Mariana Mederos (URU)	00
Meg Emmerich (BRA)	10	Meg Emmerich (BRA)	10
Danitza Sanabria (VEN)	00
