= Cycling at the 2024 Summer Paralympics – Men's road time trial H3 =

Men's road time trial B at the XVII Paralympic Games
- Venue: Clichy-sous-Bois
- Dates: 4 September
- Competitors: 11 from 8 nations
- Winning time: 43:33.22

Medalists
| 1st place, gold medalist(s) | | Mathieu Bosredon | France |
| 2nd place, silver medalist(s) | | Johan Quaile | France |
| 3rd place, bronze medalist(s) | | Martino Pini | Italy |

The Men's time trial H3 road cycling event at the 2024 Summer Paralympics took place on 4 September 2024, at Clichy-sous-Bois, Paris. 11 riders competed in the event.

The H3 classification is for handcyclists.

== Results ==
| Rank | Rider | Nationality | Class | Time | Deficit |
|---|---|---|---|---|---|
| 1st place, gold medalist(s) | Mathieu Bosredon | France | H3 | 43:33.22 | |
| 2nd place, silver medalist(s) | Johan Quaile | France | H3 | 45:33.41 | +2:00.19 |
| 3rd place, bronze medalist(s) | Martino Pini | Italy | H3 | 46:13.69 | +2:40.47 |
| 4 | Marvin Odent | Belgium | H3 | 46:20.51 | +2:47.29 |
| 5 | Mark Mekenkamp | Netherlands | H3 | 46:51.75 | +3:18.53 |
| 6 | Luis Miguel García-Marquina | Spain | H3 | 47:07.04 | +3:33.82 |
| 7 | Charles Moreau | Canada | H3 | 47:15.72 | +3:42.50 |
| 8 | Federico Mestroni | Italy | H3 | 48:33.04 | +4:59.82 |
| 9 | Mirko Testa | Italy | H3 | 49:05.30 | +5:32.08 |
| 10 | Brandon Lyons | United States | H3 | 49:34.02 | +6:00.80 |
| 11 | Richard Espinoza Balza | Venezuela | H3 | 53:05.30 | +9:32.08 |
