= Judo at the 2023 Parapan American Games – Women's 70 kg =

Women's 70 kg at the 2023 Parapan American Games
- Venue: Contact Sports Center
- Dates: November 20
- Competitors: 4 from 4 nations

Medalists
1st place, gold medalist(s)		Brenda Souza	Brazil
2nd place, silver medalist(s)		Nadia Boggiano	Argentina
3rd place, bronze medalist(s)		Ariagna Hechevarría	Cuba

The women's 70 kg competition of the judo events at the 2023 Parapan American Games was held on November 20 at the Contact Sports Center (Centro de Entrenamiento de los Deportes de Contacto) in Santiago, Chile. A total of 4 athletes from 4 NOCs competed. Due to the competition having only four competitors, only one bronze metal was presented and not the usual two.

== Results ==
The results were as follows:

=== Pool A ===
Athlete	Pld	W	L	Points	Qualification
Brenda Souza (BRA)	3	3	0	30	1st place, gold medalist(s)
Nadia Boggiano (ARG)	3	2	1	20	2nd place, silver medalist(s)
Ariagna Hechevarría (CUB)	3	1	2	10	3rd place, bronze medalist(s)
Francisca Almanza (CHI)	3	0	3	0	Fourth-place

Date	Time	Player 1	Score	Player 2
November 20	10:32	Brenda Souza (Brazil)	10–00	(Chile) Francisca Almanza
November 20	10:36	Ariagna Hechevarría (Cuba)	00–10	(Argentina) Nadia Boggiano
November 20	11:44	Brenda Souza (Brazil)	10–00	(Cuba) Ariagna Hechevarría
November 20	11:48	Francisca Almanza (Chile)	00–10	(Argentina) Nadia Boggiano
November 20	12:08	Brenda Souza (Brazil)	10–00	(Argentina) Nadia Boggiano
November 19	12:12	Francisca Almanza (Chile)	00–10	(Cuba) Ariagna Hechevarría
