= Cycling at the 2024 Summer Paralympics – Men's road race H3 =

Men's road race H3 at the XVII Paralympic Games
- Venue: Clichy-sous-Bois
- Dates: 5 September
- Competitors: 11 from 8 nations
- Winning time: 1:34:36

Medalists
1st place, gold medalist(s)		Mathieu Bosredon	France
2nd place, silver medalist(s)		Johan Quaile	France
3rd place, bronze medalist(s)		Mirko Testa	Italy

The men's road race H3 cycling event at the 2024 Summer Paralympics took place on 5 September 2024 in Clichy-sous-Bois, Seine-Saint-Denis, Paris, France. 11 riders competed in the event.

== Schedule ==
F	Finals

Men's Road Race
Event↓/Date →	5 September	6 September	7 September
B		F	
H1-2	F		
H3	F		
H4	F		
H5	F		
C1-3			F
C4-5		F	
T1-2			F

== Results ==
Rank	Rider	Nationality	Class	Time	Gap	Notes
1st place, gold medalist(s)	Mathieu Bosredon	France	(H3)	1:34:36		
2nd place, silver medalist(s)	Johan Quaile	France	(H3)	1:35:57	+1:21	
3rd place, bronze medalist(s)	Mirko Testa	Italy	(H3)	1:39:38	+5:02	
4	Luis Miguel Garcia	Spain	(H3)	1:39:39	+5:03	
5	Martino Pini	Italy	(H3)	1:39:39	+5:03	
6	Marvin Odent	Belgium	(H3)	1:40:00	+5:24	
7	Brandon Lyons	United States	(H3)	1:44:22	+9:46	
8	Mark Mekenkamp	Netherlands	(H3)	1:45:14	+10:38	
9	Richard Espinoza	Venezuela	(H3)	1:53:13	+18:37	
	Charles Moreau	Canada	(H3)	DNF		
	Federico Mestroni	Italy	(H3)	DNF		
