= Judo at the 2023 Parapan American Games – Men's +90 kg =

Men's 90+ kg at the 2023 Parapan American Games
- Venue: Contact Sports Center
- Dates: November 20
- Competitors: 6 from 5 nations

Medalists
| 1st place, gold medalist(s) | | Yordani Fernández | Cuba |
| 2nd place, silver medalist(s) | | Willians Silva | Brazil |
| 3rd place, bronze medalist(s) | | Sérgio Fernandes | Brazil |
| 3rd place, bronze medalist(s) | | Cristian Alderete | Argentina |

The men's 90+ kg competition of the judo events at the 2023 Parapan American Games was held on November 20 at the Contact Sports Center (Centro de Entrenamiento de los Deportes de Contacto) in Santiago, Chile. A total of 6 athletes from 5 NOC's competed.

== Results ==
=== Repechage ===
Bronze metal match
Oscar Aguirre (MEX) | 00
Sérgio Fernandes (BRA) | 10
Ricardo Parra (CHI) | 01
Cristian Alderete (ARG) | 10

=== Main Bracket ===
Quarterfinals
Cristian Alderete (ARG) | 10
Oscar Aguirre (MEX) | 01
Sérgio Fernandes (BRA) | 10
Ricardo Parra (CHI) | 00

Semifinals
Willians Silva (BRA) | 10
Cristian Alderete (ARG) | 00
Yordani Fernández (CUB) | 10
Sérgio Fernandes (BRA) | 00

Final
Willians Silva (BRA) | 00
Yordani Fernández (CUB) | 10
