= Marvin Odent =

Belgian para-cyclist (born 1983)

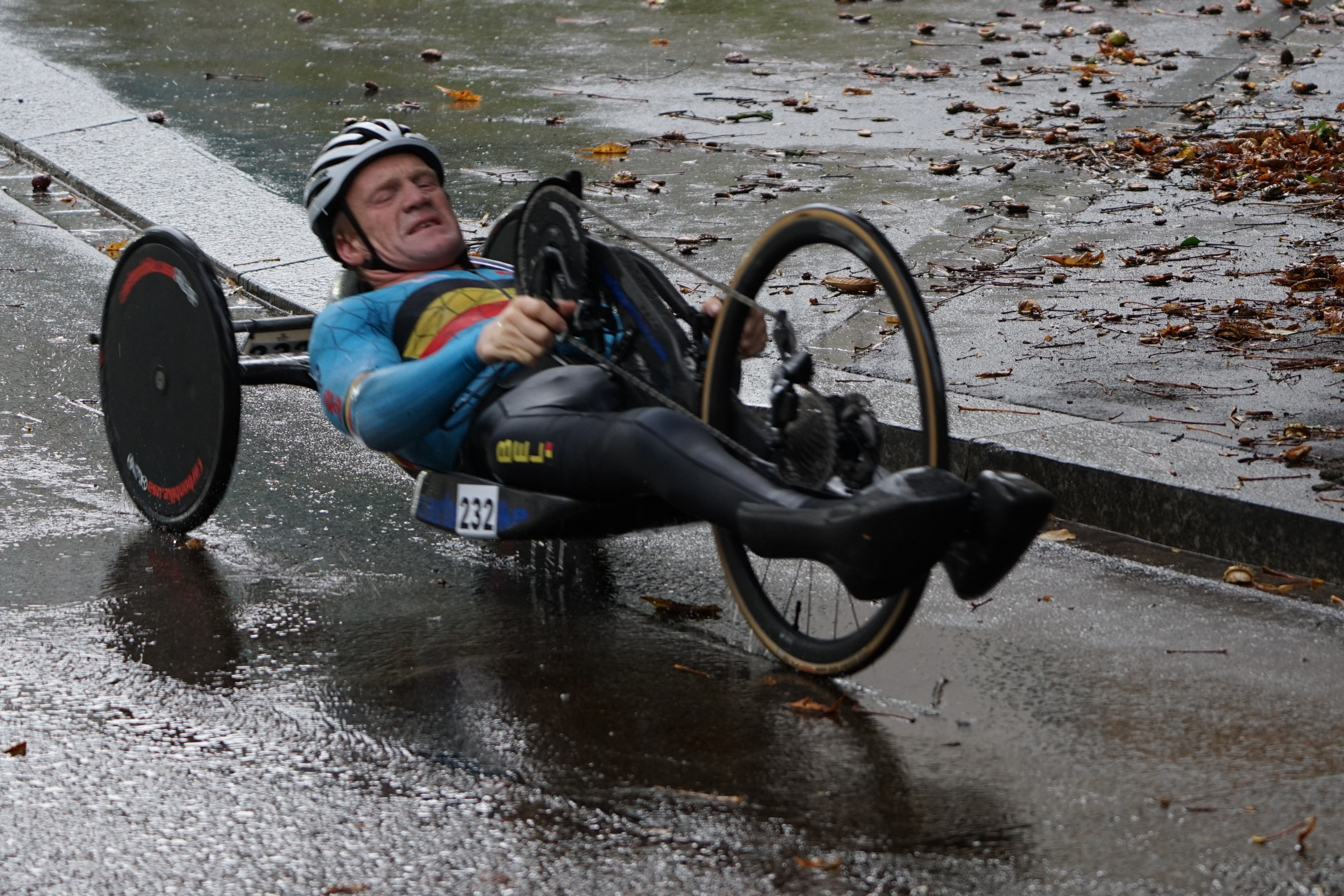
- Marvin Odent during the 2024 World Championships

Personal information
- Nationality: Belgian
- Born: 16 September 1983 (age 42)

Sport
- Sport: Para-cycling
- Disability class: H3
- Coached by: Remko Meeusen
Medal record
Men's Para-cycling
Representing Belgium
Road World Championships
| Gold medal – first place | 2026 Huntsville | Time trial H3 |
| Bronze medal – third place | 2024 Zurich | Time trial H3 |
| Bronze medal – third place | 2025 Ronse | Time trial H3 |

Marvin Odent (born 16 September 1983) is a Belgian Para-cyclist who represented Belgium at the 2024 Summer Paralympics.

== Biography ==
Odent, from Hollebeke, fell while working as a carpenter in 2016, suffered a collapsed long, 10 broken ribs, and a T9 spinal cord injury leaving him paraplegic. He spent 2.5 months in hospital and 4 months in rehabilitation. Not being one for idling at home, he joined handbikeclub The Spirit of Handcycling. After three years of purely recreational cycling, he made the switch to competition cycling.

== Biography ==
Odent is married with three children. He founded Life On Wheels, a sports project that aims to promote and introduce wheelchair sports to people in Ieper, Belgium.

== Career ==
After turning to competition cycling in 2021, Odent had near immediate success winning several national titles since 2022.

He made his international debut for Belgium in 2023. That year, he finished second in the para-Cycling Classics Tour in Flanders.

In 2024 he won his first international medal, finishing second in Round III of the 2024 UCI Para-Cycling Road World Cup in Maniago, Italy and was selected for the 2024 Summer Olympic Games.

Odent represented Belgium in the men's road time trial H3 and men's road race H3 events at the 2024 Summer Paralympics. He finished just outside the medals, in fourth place, in the time trial and in sixth place in the road race.
