= Powerlifting at the 2023 Parapan American Games – Men's 49 kg =

Men's 49 kg at the 2023 Parapan American Games
- Venue: Chimkowe Gym
- Dates: November 18
- Competitors: 6 from 5 nations

Medalists
1st place, gold medalist(s)		Lucas Galvao Dos Santos	Brazil
2nd place, silver medalist(s)		Enmanuel González Rodríguez	Cuba
3rd place, bronze medalist(s)		Jhonny Morales	Colombia

The men's 49 kg competition of the powerlifting events at the 2023 Parapan American Games was held on November 18 at the Chimkowe Gym in Santiago, Chile.

== Records ==
Prior to this competition, the existing world and Pan American Games records were as follows:

World record	Lê Văn Công (VIE)	183.5 kg	Mexico City, Mexico	December 4, 2017
Parapan American Games record	Joao Franca Junior (BRA)	141 kg	Lima, Peru	August 29, 2019
Americas record	Jhonny Morales (COL)	151 kg	Dubai, United Arab Emirates	August 23, 2023

== Results ==
The results were as follows:

Rank	Name	Body weight (kg)	Attempts (kg)				Result (kg)
Rank	Name	Body weight (kg)	1	2	3	4	Result (kg)
1st place, gold medalist(s)	Lucas Galvao Dos Santos (BRA)	48.4	142	146	150	~~156~~	150
2nd place, silver medalist(s)	Enmanuel González Rodríguez (CUB)	46.4	145	149	~~152~~		149
3rd place, bronze medalist(s)	Jhonny Morales (COL)	48.2	143	148	~~153~~		148
4	Jhonatan Montero (VEN)	48.6	138	142	~~148~~		142
5	Rodrigo Villamarín (ARG)	48.4	124	~~128~~	~~128~~		124
6	Andrés Bernardo Díaz (VEN)	48.9	~~128~~	~~128~~	~~128~~		-
