= Triathlon at the 2024 Summer Paralympics – Women's PTVI =

Women's PTVI at the XVII Paralympic Games
- Venue: Pont Alexandre III
- Dates: 2 September 2024
- Competitors: 11 from 8 nations

Medalists
1st place, gold medalist(s)		Susana Rodríguez	Spain
2nd place, silver medalist(s)		Francesca Tarantello	Italy
3rd place, bronze medalist(s)		Anja Renner	Germany

The Triathlon at the 2024 Summer Paralympics – Women's PTVI event at the 2024 Paralympic Games will take place at 07:15 CET on 2 September 2024 at Pont Alexandre III, Paris.

== Venue ==
The triathlon course will start from Pont Alexandre III bridge near Seine River and will end at the same place. The event will be over sprint distance. There will be 750 metre Swim through Seine River, 20 km tandem para cycling at Champs-Élysées, Avenue Montaigne, crossing the Seine by the Pont des Invalides and reaching the Quai d'Orsay and last leg of 5 km run will end at Pont Alexandre III bridge.

== Entry list ==
World Triathlon confirmed the final entry list for the event in August 2024.

Rank	Bib	Athlete	Nationality	c.t.	Swim	T1	Bike	T2	Run	Total Time	Notes
1st place, gold medalist(s)	607	Susana Rodriguez; Guide:Sara Pérez Sala	Spain		12:20	1:02	31:01	0:42	19:14	1:04:19	
2nd place, silver medalist(s)	606	Francesca Tarantello; Guide:Silvia Visaggi	Italy	+3:11	14:19	1:00	31:28	0:39	19:17	1:06:43	
3rd place, bronze medalist(s)	609	Anja Renner; Guide:Maria Paulig	Germany	+3:11	16:27	1:05	30:49	0:38	19:22	1:08:21	
4	612	Alison Peasgood; Guide:Brooke Gillies	Great Britain	+3:11	15:38	1:05	31:31	0:41	20:26	1:09:21	
5	610	Annouck Curzillat; Guide:Julie Marano	France		13:30	1:12	32:50	0:46	22:10	1:10:28	
6	608	Chloe MacCombe; Guide:Catherine A Sands	Ireland	+3:11	17:30	1:13	30:55	0:45	20:09	1:10:32	
7	611	Héloïse Courvoisier; Guide:Anne Henriet	France	+3:11	16:36	0:58	32:00	0:44	20:45	1:11:03	
8	614	Judith MacCombe; Guide:Eimear Nicholls	Ireland	+3:11	17:47	1:12	30:52	0:44	20:42	1:11:17	
9	613	Leticia Freitas; Guide:Giovanna Alves Opipari	Brazil		13:31	1:30	35:14	0:38	20:27	1:11:20	
10	615	Anna Barbaro; Guide:Charlotte Bonin	Italy		12:46	1:27	33:44	0:48	23:16	1:12:01	
11	616	Aitunuk Zhoomart Kyzy; Guide:Angelina Blindul	Kyrgyzstan		18:27	1:32	38:01	1:05	26:31	1:25:36	

Key : T = Transition; L = Lap
