= Carlotta Ragazzini =

Italian para table tennis player

Personal information
- Nationality: Italian
- Born: 15 September 2001 (age 25) Faenza, Italy

Sport
- Country: Italy
- Sport: Para table tennis
- Disability class: C3
Medal record
Para table tennis
Representing Italy
Paralympic Games
Bronze medal – third place	2024 Paris	Singles C3

Carlotta Ragazzini (born 15 September 2001) is an Italian para table tennis player who represented Italy at the 2024 Summer Paralympics.

== Career ==
Ragazzini represented Italy at the 2024 Summer Paralympics and won a bronze medal in the singles C3 event.
