= Judo at the 2023 Parapan American Games =

Judo competitions at the 2023 Parapan American Games

- Judo pictogram
- Venue: Contact Sports Center
- Dates: 19 – 20 November 2023
- No. of events: 8 (4 men, 4 women)
- Competitors: 59 from 12 nations

Judo competitions at the 2023 Parapan American Games in Santiago, Chile were held at the Contact Sports Center from 19 to 20 November 2023.

== Participating nations ==
There are 59 judokas from 12 nations participating.

- Argentina (8)
- Brazil (15)
- Canada (2)
- Chile (7) (Host)
- Colombia (1)
- Cuba (8)
- Mexico (3)
- Peru (1)
- Puerto Rico (1)
- United States (8)
- Uruguay (2)
- Venezuela (3)

== Medal summary ==
=== Medal table ===
* Host nation (Chile)

Rank	Nation	Gold	Silver	Bronze	Total
1	Brazil	6	4	3	13
2	Cuba	2	0	3	5
3	Argentina	0	3	3	6
4	United States	0	1	3	4
5	Mexico	0	0	1	1
5	Uruguay	0	0	1	1
Totals (6 entries)		8	8	14	30

=== Medalists ===
==== Men's events ====
Event	Gold	Silver	Bronze
60 kg	Elielton Lira; Brazil	Thiego Marques; Brazil	Bryan Aburto; Mexico
60 kg	Elielton Lira; Brazil	Thiego Marques; Brazil	Henry Borges; Uruguay
73 kg	Harlley Pereira; Brazil	Eduardo Gauto; Argentina	Jennys García; Cuba
73 kg	Harlley Pereira; Brazil	Eduardo Gauto; Argentina	José Romero; Cuba
90 kg	Marcelo de Azevedo; Brazil	Arthur Cavalcante; Brazil	Ben Goodrich; United States
90 kg	Marcelo de Azevedo; Brazil	Arthur Cavalcante; Brazil	Richard Ties; United States
+90 kg	Yordani Fernández; Cuba	Wilians Silva; Brazil	Cristian Alderete; Argentina
+90 kg	Yordani Fernández; Cuba	Wilians Silva; Brazil	Sérgio Fernandes; Brazil

==== Women's events ====
Event	Gold	Silver	Bronze
48 kg	Rosicleide Silva; Brazil	Rocío Ledesma; Argentina	Giulia dos Santos; Brazil
57 kg	Lúcia Teixeira; Brazil	Maria Liana Mutia; United States	Laura González; Argentina
57 kg	Lúcia Teixeira; Brazil	Maria Liana Mutia; United States	Paula Gómez; Argentina
70 kg	Brenda Souza; Brazil	Nadia Boggiano; Argentina	Ariagna Hechevarría; Cuba
+70 kg	Sheyla Hernández; Cuba	Meg Emmerich; Brazil	Katie Davis; United States
+70 kg	Sheyla Hernández; Cuba	Meg Emmerich; Brazil	Rebeca de Souza; Brazil

== See also ==
- Judo at the 2023 Pan American Games
- Judo at the 2024 Summer Paralympics
