= Powerlifting at the 2023 Parapan American Games – Men's 88 kg =

Men's 88 kg at the 2023 Parapan American Games
- Venue: Chimkowe Gym
- Dates: November 20
- Competitors: 6 from 5 nations

Medalists
1st place, gold medalist(s)		Evânio da Silva	Brazil
2nd place, silver medalist(s)		Huver Mondragón	Colombia
3rd place, bronze medalist(s)		Oniger Drake Vega	Cuba

The men's 88 kg competition of the powerlifting events at the 2023 Parapan American Games was held on November 20 at the Chimkowe Gym in Santiago, Chile.

== Records ==
Prior to this competition, the existing world and Pan American Games records were as follows:

World record	Abdelkareem Khattab (JOR)	251 kg	Dubai, United Arab Emirates	August 29, 2023
Parapan American Games record	Evânio da Silva (BRA)	201 kg	Lima, Peru	August 31, 2019
Americas record	José Castillo Castillo (MEX)	220 kg	Dubai, United Arab Emirates	April 9, 2014

== Results ==
The results were as follows:

Rank	Name	Body weight (kg)	Attempts (kg)				Result (kg)
Rank	Name	Body weight (kg)	1	2	3	4	Result (kg)
1st place, gold medalist(s)	Evânio da Silva (BRA)	84.2	191	193	197		197
2nd place, silver medalist(s)	Huver Mondragón (COL)	85.9	186	192	196	~~202~~	196
3rd place, bronze medalist(s)	Oniger Drake Vega (CUB)	82.3	185	188	194		194
4	Andre Paz (BRA)	87.0	180	187	~~190~~		187
5	Ahmed Shafik (USA)	86.0	182	~~186~~	~~186~~		182
6	Frank Feliu (CHI)	87.7	170	~~177~~	~~183~~		170
