= Athletics at the 2023 Parapan American Games – Men's 100 metres T12 =

Men's 100 metres T12 at the 2023 Parapan American Games
- Venue: Mario Recordón Athletics Training Center
- Dates: November 25
- Competitors: 4 from 4 nations
- Winning time: 11.18

Medalists
1st place, gold medalist(s)		Fernando Vázquez	Argentina
2nd place, silver medalist(s)		Marcos Vinícius de Oliveira	Brazil
3rd place, bronze medalist(s)		Pedro José Urgellés	Cuba

The men's T12 100 metres competition of the athletics events at the 2023 Parapan American Games was held on November 25 at the Mario Recordón Athletics Training Center within the Julio Martínez National Stadium of Santiago, Chile.

== Records ==
Prior to this competition, the existing world and Pan American Games records were as follows:

World record	Salum Kashafali (NOR)	10.43	Tokyo, Japan	August 29, 2021
Parapan American Games record	Fabricio Barros (BRA)	10.97	Lima, Peru	August 28, 2019
Americas record	Noah Malone (USA)	10.50	Paris, France	July 9, 2023

== Schedule ==
Date	Time	Round
November 25, 2023	16:02	Final

== Results ==
All times shown are in seconds.

KEY:	q	Fastest non-qualifiers	Q	Qualified	PR	Parapan Games record	NR	National record	SB	Seasonal best	DQ	Disqualified

=== Final ===
The results were as follows:
Wind: +3.5 m/s

Rank	Lane	Name	Nationality	Time	Notes
1st place, gold medalist(s)	3	Fernando Vázquez	Argentina	11.18	
2nd place, silver medalist(s)	5	Marcos Vinícius de Oliveira	Brazil	11.38	
3rd place, bronze medalist(s)	1	Pedro José Urgellés	Cuba	11.42	
4	7	Richard Gonzalez (Guide: Fary Mejia)	Dominican Republic	DQ	
