= Johan Quaile =

French para-cyclist

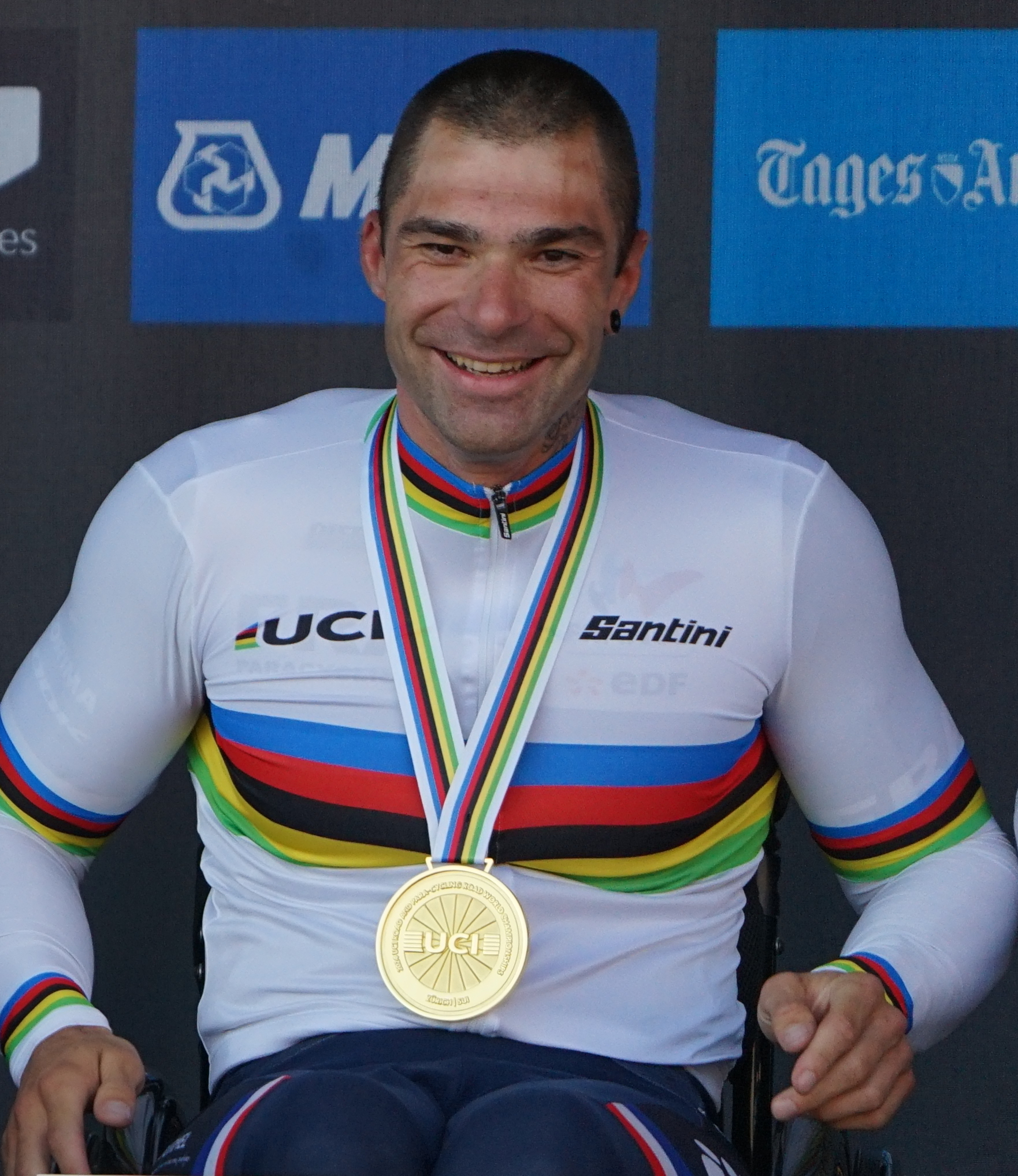
- Quaile winning gold at the 2024 UCI Para-cycling Road World Championships

Cycling career
- Sport: Cycling
Medal record
Men's para-cycling
Representing France
Paralympic Games
Silver medal – second place	2024 Paris	Road time trial H3
Silver medal – second place	2024 Paris	Road race H3
Road World Championships
Gold medal – first place	2024 Zurich	Team relay H1–5
Gold medal – first place	2025 Ronse	Mixed team relay H1–5
Silver medal – second place	2025 Ronse	Time trial H3

Johan Quaile is a French para-cyclist. He competed at the 2024 Summer Paralympics and won the silver medal in the men's road time trial H3 event.
