= Francesca Tarantello =

Italian paralympic triathlete

Personal information
- Born: 2001 or 2002 (age 24–25)

Sport
- Country: Italy
- Sport: Paratriathlon
Medal record
Women's paratriathlon
Representing Italy
Paralympic Games
| Silver medal – second place | 2024 Paris | PTVI |
World Championships
| Gold medal – first place | 2023 Ponteverde | PTVI |
| Silver medal – second place | 2024 Torremolinos | PTVI |
| Silver medal – second place | 2025 Wollongong | PTVI |
| Silver medal – second place | 2026 Pontevedra | PTVI |
European Championships
| Silver medal – second place | 2025 Besançon | PTVI |
| Bronze medal – third place | 2023 Madrid | PTVI |

Francesca Tarantello (born 2001/2002) is an Italian paralympic triathlete. She competed at the 2024 Summer Paralympics, winning the silver medal in the women's PTVI event.
