= Andreea Mogoș =

Romanian-born Italian wheelchair fencer

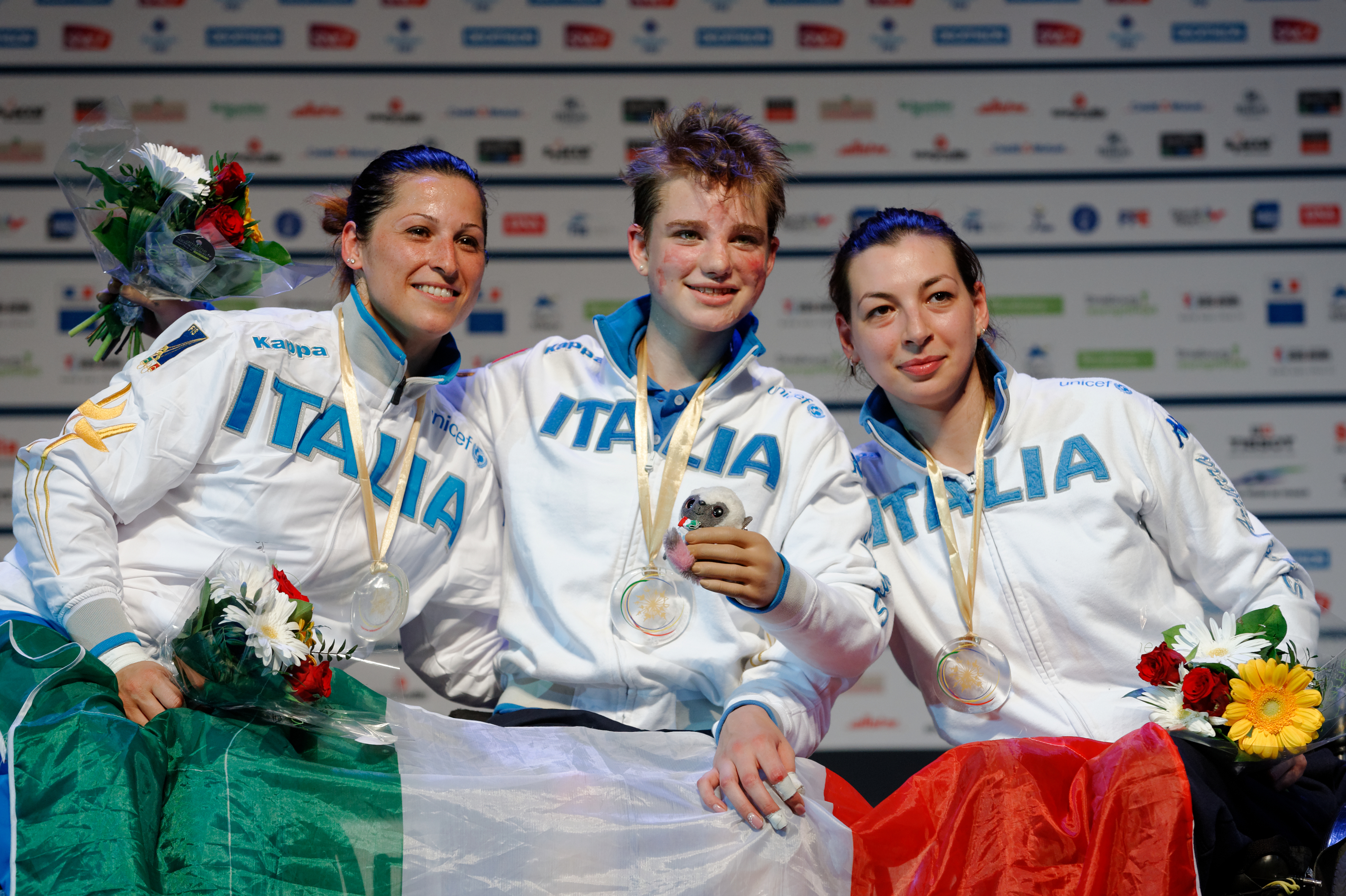
- Mogoș (right) in 2014

Personal information
- Full name: Andreea Ionela Mogoș
- Born: 2 June 1988 (age 38) Vaslui, Romania

Sport
- Country: Italy
- Sport: Wheelchair fencing
- Club: G.S. Fiamme Oro
Medal record
Event	1st	2nd	3rd
Paralympic Games	0	1	2
World Championships	1	1	2
European Championships	2	2	1
Total	3	4	5

Andreea Ionela Mogoș (born 2 June 1988) is a Romanian-born Italian wheelchair fencer. She competed at the 2016 Summer Paralympics, winning a bronze medal in Women's team foil, and at the 2020 Summer Paralympics, winning a silver medal in Women's foil team.
