= Mathieu Bosredon =

French para-cyclist (born 1990)

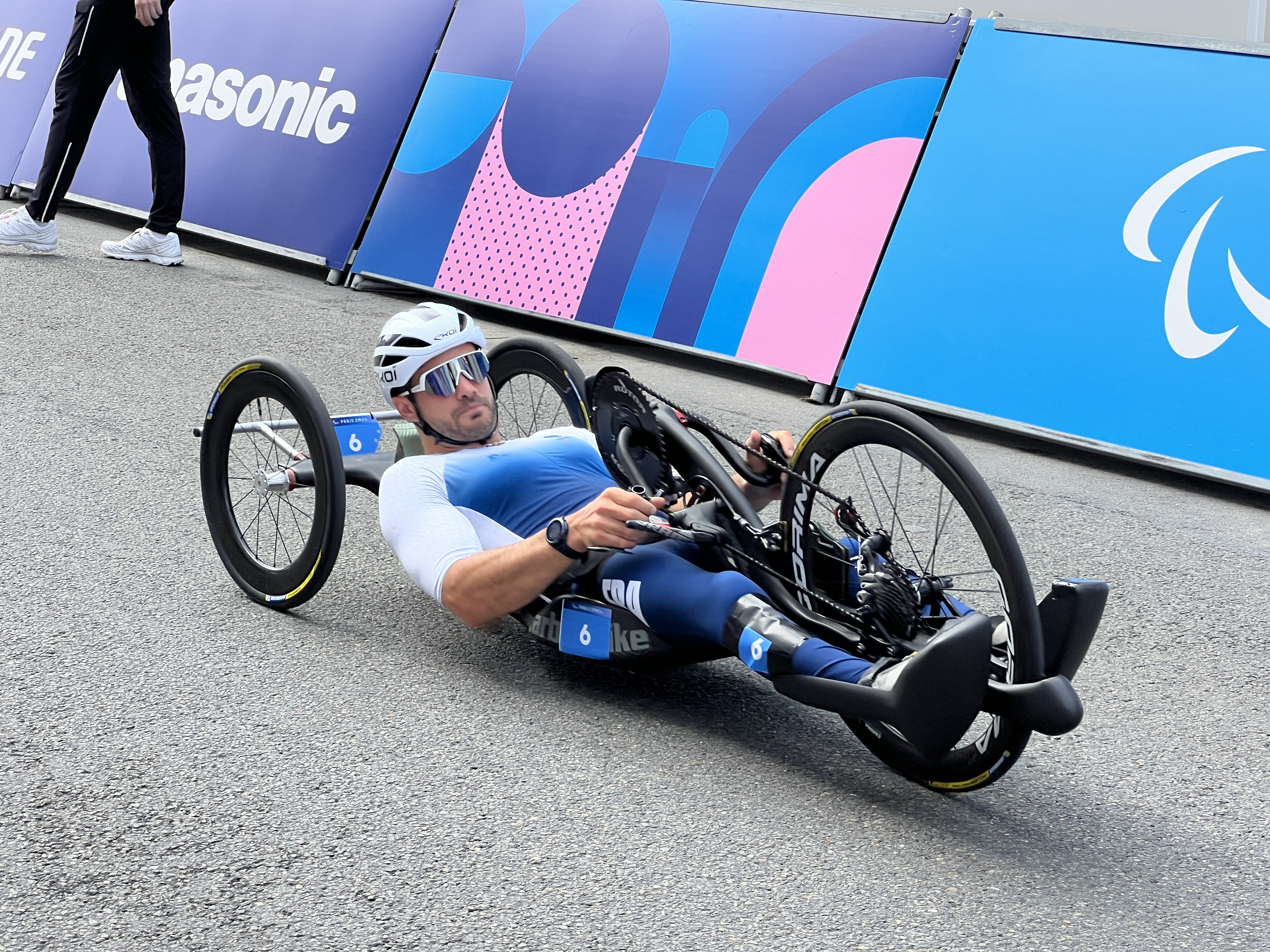

Personal information
- Born: 30 November 1990 (age 35)

Cycling career
- Sport: Cycling
Medal record
Representing France
Paralympic Games
Gold medal – first place	2024 Paris	Road time trial H3
Gold medal – first place	2024 Paris	Road race H3
Gold medal – first place	2024 Paris	Mixed team relay H1–5
Road World Championships
Gold medal – first place	2024 Zurich	Time trial H3
Gold medal – first place	2024 Zurich	Road race H3
Gold medal – first place	2025 Ronse	Time trial H3
Gold medal – first place	2025 Ronse	Road race H3

Mathieu Bosredon (born 30 November 1990) is a French para-cyclist.

== Career ==
Bosredon competed at the 2024 Summer Paralympics and won three gold medals in cycling.
