= Brenda Souza =

Brazilian Paralympic judoka (born 1995)

Personal information
- Full name: Brenda Souza de Freitas
- Nationality: Brazilian
- Born: 9 May 1995 (age 31) Rio de Janeiro, Brazil

Sport
- Country: Brazil
- Sport: Para judo
- Disability class: J1
- Weight class: −70 kg
Medal record
Women's para judo
Representing Brazil
Paralympic Games
Silver medal – second place	2024 Paris	−70 kg J1
Parapan American Games
Gold medal – first place	2023 Santiago	−70 kg

Brenda Souza de Freitas (born 9 May 1995) is a Brazilian Paralympic judoka. She represented Brazil at 2024 Summer Paralympics.

== Career ==
Souza represented Brazil at the 2023 Parapan American Games and won a gold medal in the −70 kg event. She then represented Brazil at the 2024 Summer Paralympics and won a silver medal in the −70 kg J1 event.
