= Sheyla Hernández Estupiñán =

Cuban Paralympic judoka (born 2000)

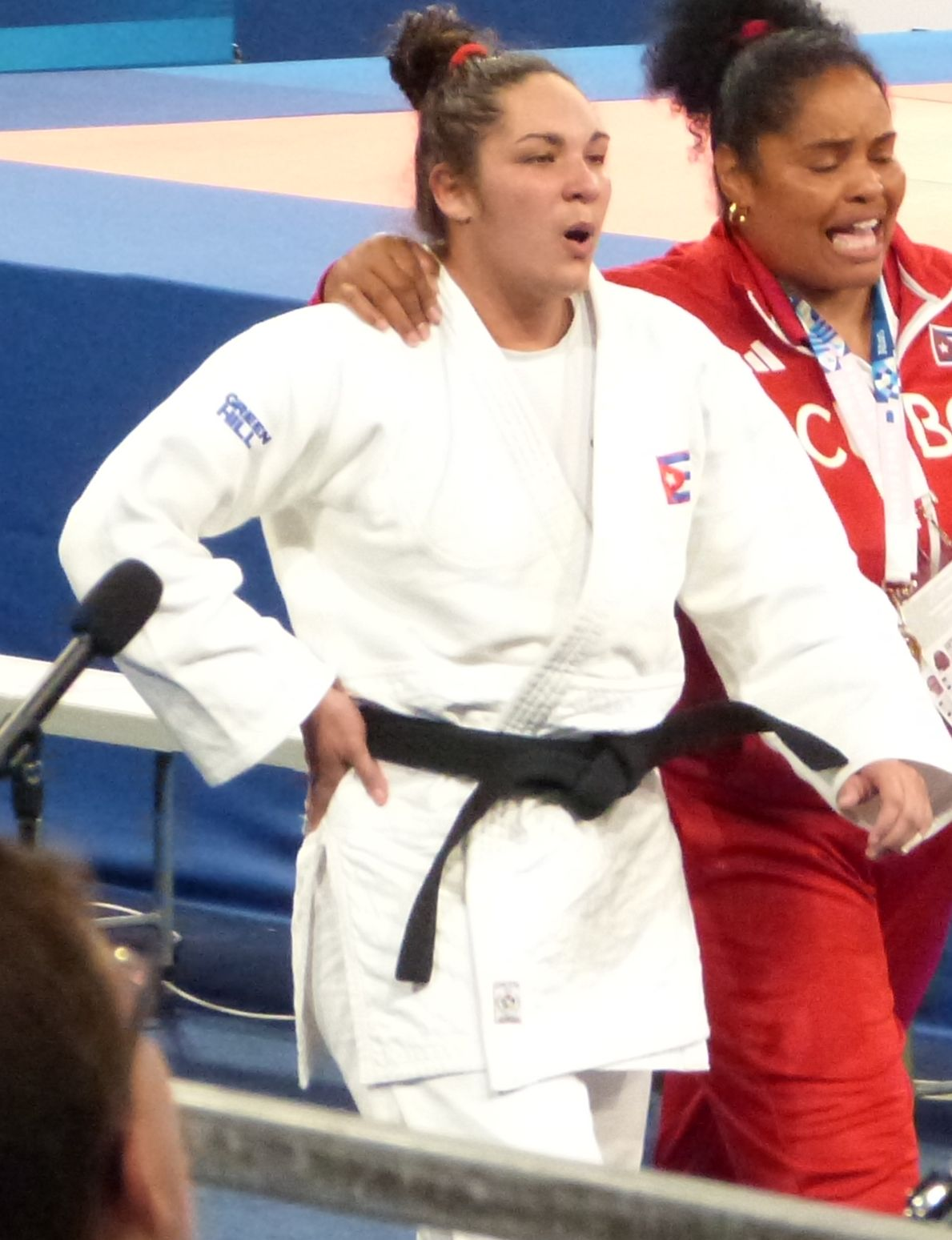

Personal information
- Full name: Sheyla Samarian Hernández Estupiñán
- Nationality: Cuban
- Born: 4 December 2000 (age 25)

Sport
- Country: Cuba
- Sport: Para judo
- Disability class: J2
- Weight class: +70 kg
Medal record
Women's para judo
Representing Cuba
Paralympic Games
Silver medal – second place	2024 Paris	+70 kg J2
Parapan American Games
Gold medal – first place	2023 Santiago	+70 kg

Sheyla Samarian Hernández Estupiñán (born 4 December 2000) is a Cuban Paralympic judoka. She represented Cuba at the 2024 Summer Paralympics.

== Career ==
She represented Cuba at the 2024 Summer Paralympics and won a silver medal in the +70 kg J2 event.
