= Mirko Testa =

Italian Paralympic cyclist (born 1997)

Personal information
- Born: 28 May 1997 (age 29) Bergamo, Italy

Sport
- Country: Italy
- Sport: Para-cycling
- Disability class: H3
Medal record
Men's cycling
Representing Italy
Paralympic Games
Silver medal – second place	2024 Paris	Mixed team relay H1–5
Bronze medal – third place	2024 Paris	Road race H3
Road World Championships
Gold medal – first place	2023 Glasgow	Road race H3
Bronze medal – third place	2022 Baie-Comeau	Time trial H3
Bronze medal – third place	2025 Ronse	Road race H3
Bronze medal – third place	2025 Ronse	Mixed team relay H1–5

Mirko Testa (born 28 May 1997) is an Italian cyclist who competes in handcycle events. He appeared in the 2024 Summer Paralympics in Paris, winning two medals.

== Early life ==
Mirko Testa was born on 28 May 1997 in Bergamo. He had competed as a motocross racer until 2018, when he was paralyzed in an accident during a motocross race.

== Cycling career ==
In the 2022 UCI Para-cycling Road World Championships, Testa finished in fourth place in the road race and won the bronze medal in the time trial. At the 2023 UCI Para-cycling Road World Championships, he won the gold medal in the road race. In the 2024 Summer Paralympics, Testa won the bronze medal in the road race.

== Personal life ==
Since 2018, Testa is in a domestic partnership with swimmer Sara Morotti.
