= Rebeca de Souza =

Brazilian Paralympic judoka (born 2001)

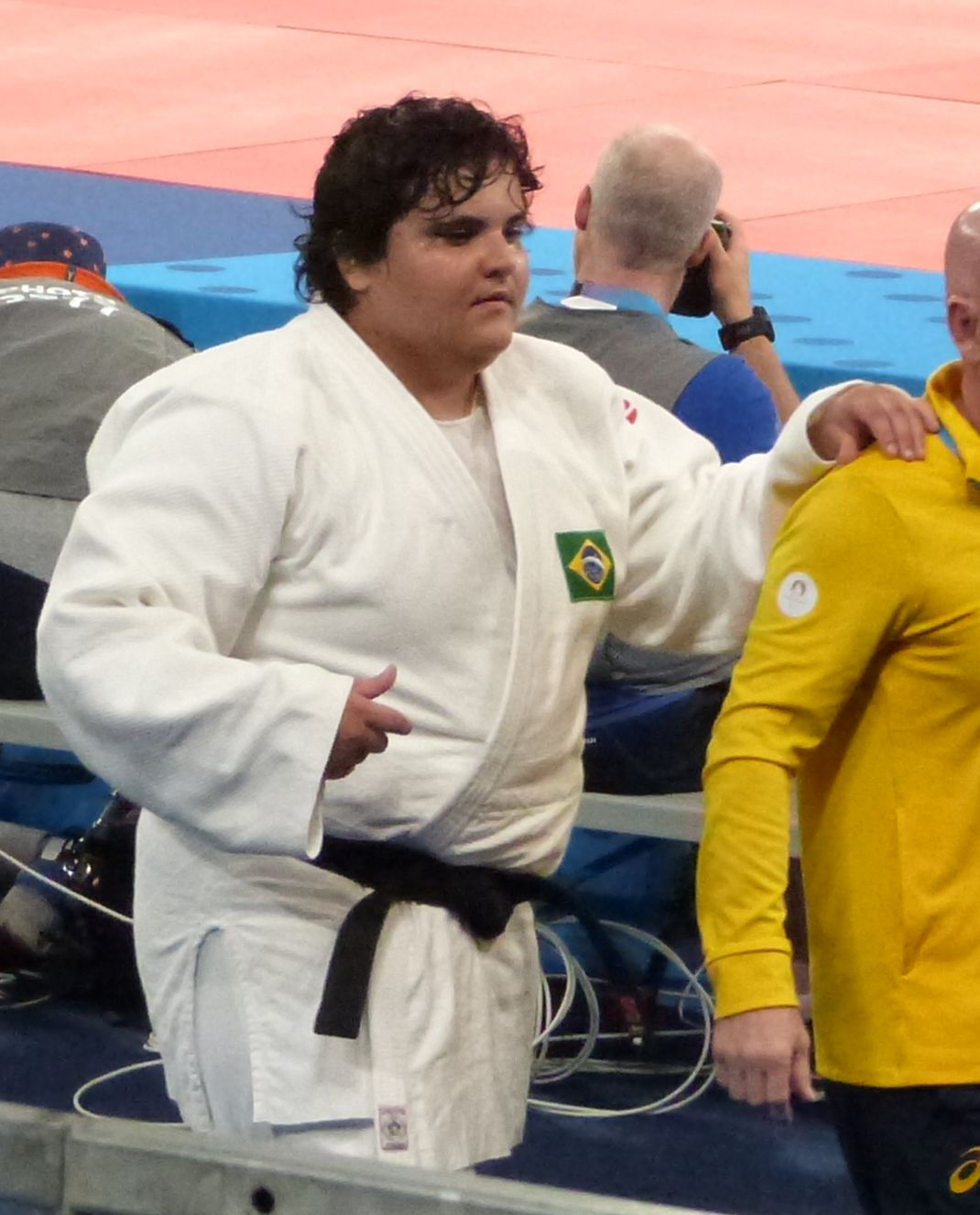
- Souza at the 2024 Summer Paralympics

Personal information
- Full name: Rebeca de Souza Silva
- Born: 11 March 2001 (age 25) São Bernardo do Campo, Brazil
- Occupation: Judoka

Sport
- Country: Brazil
- Sport: Para judo
- Disability class: J2
- Weight class: +70 kg
Medal record
Women's para judo
Representing Brazil
Paralympic Games
Gold medal – first place	2024 Paris	+70 kg J2
Parapan American Games
Silver medal – second place	2019 Lima	+70 kg
Bronze medal – third place	2023 Santiago	+70 kg

Profile at external databases
- JudoInside.com: 116966

Rebeca de Souza Silva (born 11 March 2001) is a Brazilian Paralympic judoka. She represented Brazil at the 2024 Summer Paralympics.

== Career ==
Souza competed at the 2023 Parapan American Games and won a bronze medal in the +70 kg event.

Souza represented Brazil at the 2024 Summer Paralympics and won a gold medal in the +70 kg J2 event.
