= Harlley Pereira =

Brazilian paralympian

Personal information
- Full name: Harlley Damião Pereira de Arruda
- Born: 5 July 1979 (age 46) Belo Horizonte, Brazil
- Occupation: Judoka

Sport
- Country: Brazil
- Sport: Para judo
Medal record
Para judo
Representing Brazil
Parapan American Games
Gold medal – first place	2023 Santiago	Men's 73kg
Bronze medal – third place	2011 Guadalajara	Men's 81kg
Bronze medal – third place	2015 Toronto	Men's 81kg
Bronze medal – third place	2019 Lima	Men's 81kg
IBSA Pan American Championships
Bronze medal – third place	2018 Calgary	Men's 81kg
Bronze medal – third place	2022 Edmonton	Men's 81kg

Profile at external databases
- IJF: 64936
- JudoInside.com: 89833

Harlley Damião Pereira de Arruda (born 5 July 1979) is a Brazilian Paralympic judoka who competes in international judo competitions. He is a Parapan American champion and a double bronze Pan American champion. He has competed at the 2012, 2016 and 2020 Summer Paralympics, he reached the quarterfinals at the 2012 Summer Paralympics but lost to Matthias Krieger. Pereira lost his eyesight in a gunshot accident in 1999.
