= Martino Pini =

Italian para-cyclist (born 1992)

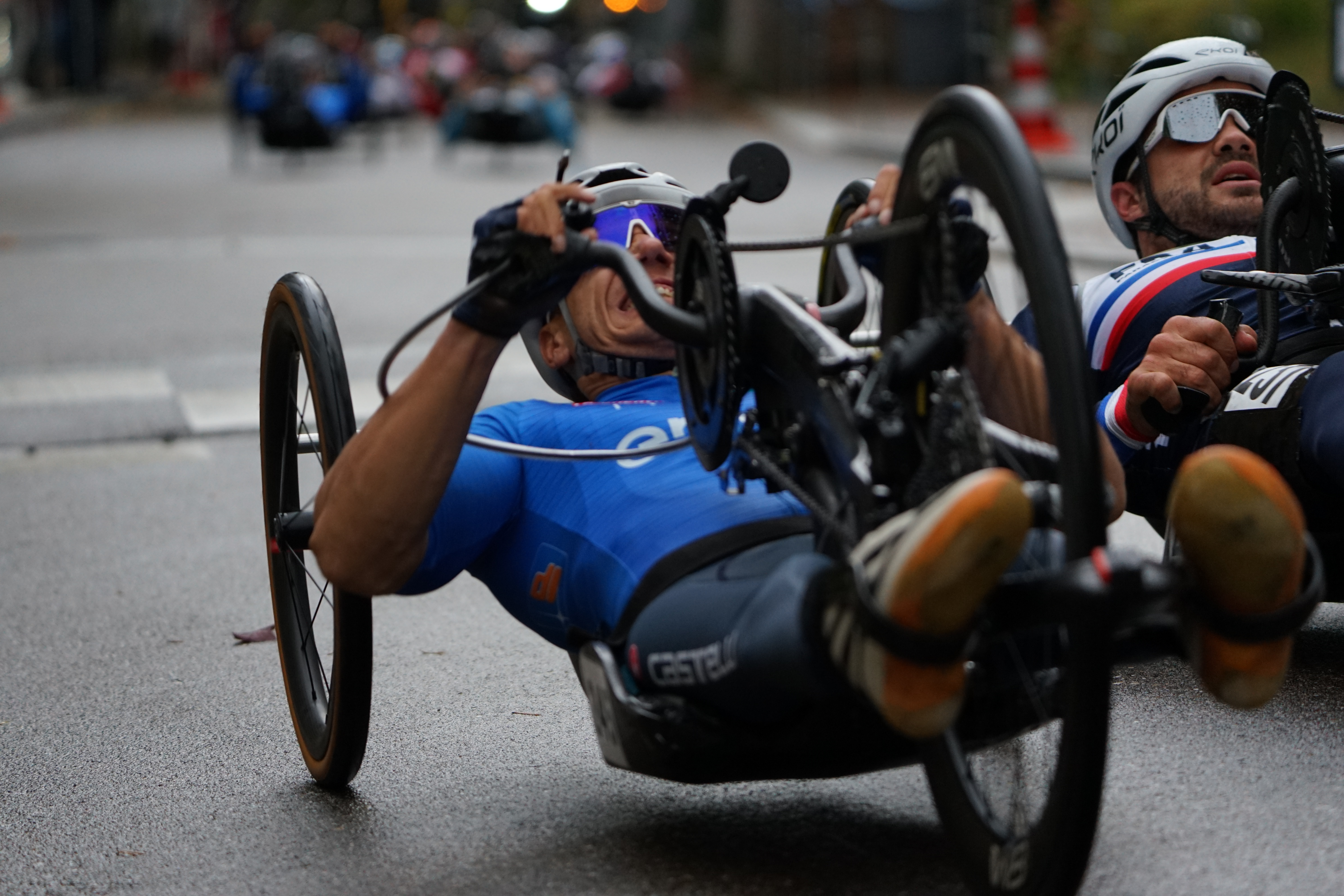
- Martino Pini in a steep climb at the 2024 World Championships

Personal information
- Born: 7 January 1992 (age 34) Tirano

Cycling career
- Sport: Cycling
Medal record
Representing Italy
Paralympic Games
Bronze medal – third place	2024 Paris	Road time trial H3
World Championships
Silver medal – second place	2024 Zurich	Road race H3
Silver medal – second place	2025 Ronse	Road race H3

Martino Pini (born 7 January 1992) is an Italian para-cyclist. He competed at the 2024 Summer Paralympics and won the bronze medal in the men's road time trial H3 event.
