= Eduardo Gauto =

Argentine Paralympic judoka

Personal information
- Full name: Eduardo Gauto Gallegos
- Nickname: Edu
- Born: 21 December 1987 (age 38) Lanús, Argentina
- Occupation: Judoka

Sport
- Country: Argentina
- Sport: Para judo
- Disability: Retinal detachment
- Coached by: Guillermo Traba
Medal record
Para judo
Representing Argentina
Parapan American Games
Gold medal – first place	2019 Lima	Men's -66kg
Silver medal – second place	2015 Toronto	Men's -60kg
IBSA Pan American Championships
Gold medal – first place	2020 Montreal	Men's -66kg

Profile at external databases
- JudoInside.com: 99653

Eduardo "Edu" Gauto Gallegos (Note: In this article, the surname is Gauto.) (born 21 December 1987) is an Argentine para judoka who competes in international judo competitions. He is a Parapan American Games champion and a Pan American silver medalist. He has competed at the Paralympic Games twice.
