= Wijnhoud =

Wijnhoud is a surname. Notable people with the surname include:

- Andre Wijnhoud (born 1992), Dutch para-cyclist
- Joost Wijnhoud (born 1969), Dutch tennis player
