= Andre Wijnhoud =

Dutch para-cyclist (born 1992)

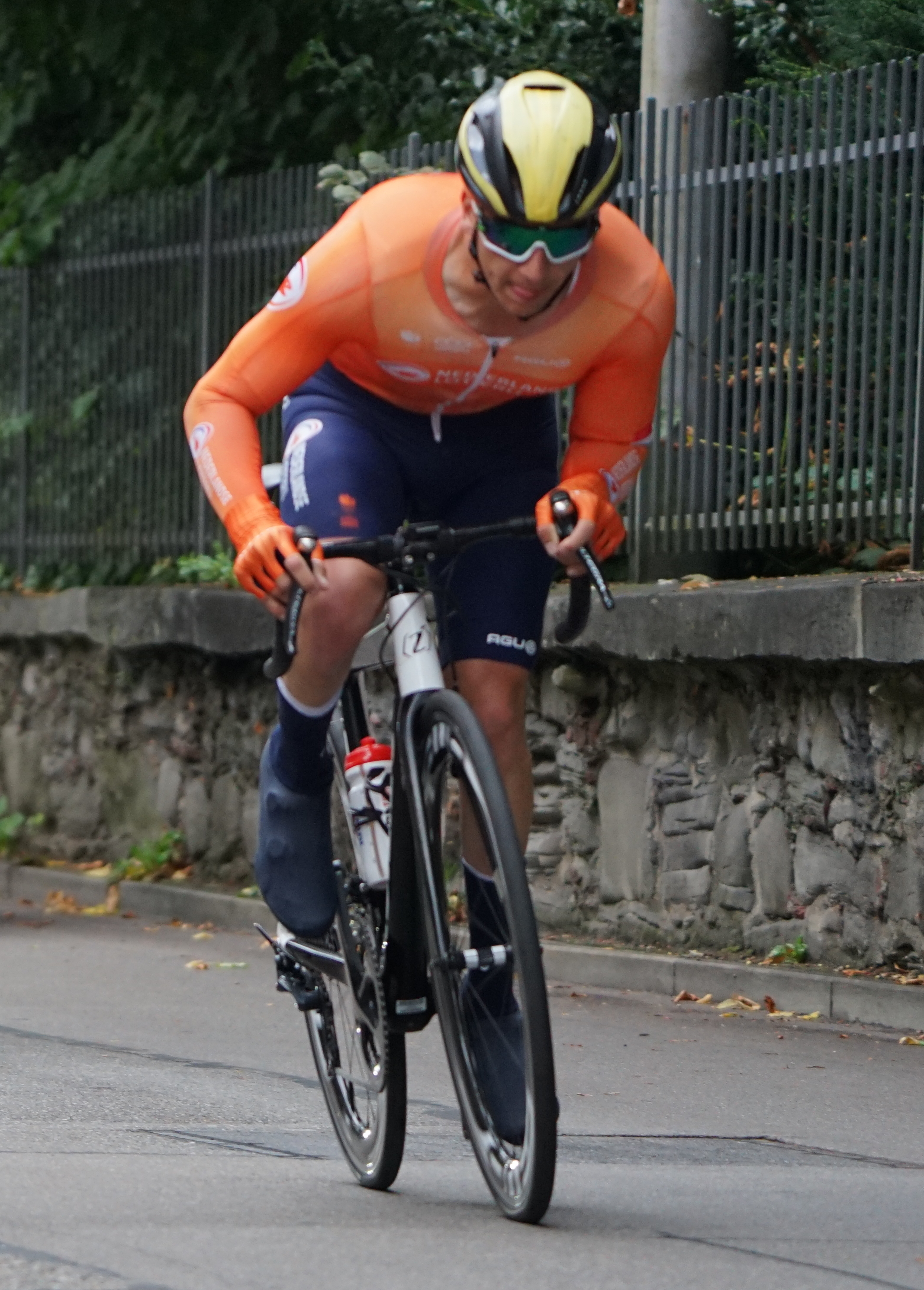
- Wijnhoud during the 2024 World Championships

Personal information
- Nationality: Dutch
- Born: 1 June 1992 (age 34) Ugchelen
- Height: 177 cm (5 ft 10 in)

Sport
- Sport: Para-cycling
- Disability: Hereditary spastic paraplegia
- Disability class: C1
Medal record
Representing Netherlands
Men's para-cycling
Road World Championships
Bronze medal – third place	2024 Zurich	Time trial C1

Andre Wijnhoud (born 1 June 1992) is a Dutch para-cyclist.

== Career ==
In September 2024, Wijnhoud competed at the 2024 UCI Para-cycling Road World Championships and won a bronze medal in the time trial C1 event.
