= Georgia at the Paralympics =

- Flag of Georgia
- IPC code: GEO
- NPC: Georgian Paralympic Committee
- Medals Ranked 95th: Gold 2 Silver 7 Bronze 4 Total 13

Summer appearances
- 2008; 2012; 2016; 2020; 2024

Winter appearances
- 2018; 2022

Other related appearances
- Soviet Union (1988)

Georgia made its Paralympic Games début at the 2008 Summer Paralympics in Beijing, sending a single representative to compete in powerlifting. The country's NPC was not established until 2003.

== Medals ==
=== Medals by Summer Games ===
Games	Athletes	Gold	Silver	Bronze	Total	Rank
(Italy) Rome 1960	did not participate					
(Japan) Tokyo 1964	did not participate					
(Israel) Tel Aviv 1968	did not participate					
(West Germany) Heidelberg 1972	did not participate					
(Canada) Toronto 1976	did not participate					
(Netherlands) Arnhem 1980	did not participate					
(United States) New York 1984	did not participate					
(South Korea) Seoul 1988	did not participate					
(Spain) Barcelona 1992	did not participate					
(United States) Atlanta 1996	did not participate					
(Australia) Sydney 2000	did not participate					
(Greece) Athens 2004	did not participate					
(China) Beijing 2008	1	0	0	0	0	-
(United Kingdom) London 2012	2	0	0	0	0	-
(Brazil) Rio de Janeiro 2016	5	1	0	0	1	60
(Japan) Tokyo 2020	13	0	3	0	3	67
(France) Paris 2024	14	1	4	4	9	51
Total		2	7	4	13	95

=== Medals by Winter Games ===
Games	Athletes	Gold	Silver	Bronze	Total	Rank
(Sweden) Örnsköldsvik 1976	did not participate					
(Norway) Geilo 1980	did not participate					
(Austria) Innsbruck 1984	did not participate					
(Austria) Innsbruck 1988	did not participate					
(France) Albertville 1992	did not participate					
(Norway) Lillehammer 1994	did not participate					
(Japan) Nagano 1998	did not participate					
(United States) Salt Lake City 2002	did not participate					
(Italy) Turin 2006	did not participate					
(Canada) Vancouver 2010	did not participate					
(Russia) 2014 Sochi	did not participate					
(South Korea) 2018 Pyeongchang	1	0	0	0	0	—
Total		0	0	0	0	−

=== Medals by Summer Sport ===
Games	Gold	Silver	Bronze	Total
Judo	1	5	1	7
Athletics	1	0	0	1
Wheelchair fencing	0	1	1	2
Shooting	0	1	0	1
Taekwondo	0	0	1	1
Powerlifting	0	0	1	1
Total	2	7	4	13

=== Medals by Winter Sport ===
Games	Gold	Silver	Bronze	Total
Total	0	0	0	0

== Medalists ==
Medal	Name	Games	Sport	Event
Gold	Zviad Gogotchuri	2016 Rio de Janeiro	Judo	Men's −90 kg
Silver	Nino Tibilashvili	2020 Tokyo	Wheelchair fencing	Women's sabre A
Silver	Ina Kaldani	2020 Tokyo	Judo	Women's −70 kg
Silver	Revaz Chikoidze	2020 Tokyo	Judo	Men's +100 kg
Gold	Giga Ochkhikidze	2024 Paris	Athletics	Men's shot put
Silver	Vladimer Tchintcharauli	2024 Paris	Shooting	Mixed 50 metre rifle prone
Silver	Zurab Zurabiani	2024 Paris	Judo	Men's −60 Kg
Silver	Giorgi Kaldani	2024 Paris	Judo	Men's −73 Kg
Silver	Revaz Chikoidze	2024 Paris	Judo	Men's +90 kg
Bronze	Ana Japaridze	2024 Paris	Taekwondo	Women's –52 kg
Bronze	Nino Tibilashvili	2024 Paris	Wheelchair fencing	Women's sabre A
Bronze	Ina Kaldani	2024 paris	Judo	Women's −70 kg
Bronze	Akaki Jintcharadze	2024 paris	Powerlifting	Men's +107 kg

== Full results for Georgia at the Paralympics ==
Name	Games	Sport	Event	Score	Rank
Iago Gorgodze	2008 Beijing	Powerlifting	Men's -90 kg	140 kg	8
Shota Omarashvili	2012 London	Powerlifting	Men's -60kg	no mark	-
Nika Tvauri	2012 London	Swimming	Men's 100m breaststroke SB11	heats: 1:28.37 did not advance	13
Vano Tsiklauri	2016 Rio de Janeiro	Archery	Men's individual recurve open	435	33
Zviad Gogotchuri	2016 Rio de Janeiro	Judo	Men's −90 kg	-	1
Akaki Jintcharadze	2016 Rio de Janeiro	Powerlifting	Men's −97 kg	155 kg	9
Lia Chachibaia	2016 Rio de Janeiro	Swimming	100 m breaststroke SB8	heats: 2:02.60 did not advance	9
Irma Khetsuriani	2016 Rio de Janeiro	Wheelchair fencing	Women's Foil B	Quarterfinals	

== See also ==
- Georgia at the Olympics
