= List of 2024 Summer Paralympics medal winners =

The 2024 Summer Paralympics, the 17th Summer Paralympic Games, and also more generally known as the Paris 2024 Paralympic Games, was a major international multi-sport event for the disabled governed by the International Paralympic Committee, taking place in Paris, France from 28 August to 8 September. There are competition in 549 events in 22 sports.

== Archery ==
=== Men's events ===
Event	Class	Gold	Silver	Bronze
Individual	W1	Jason Tabansky; United States	Han Guifei; China	Zhang Tianxin; China
Individual compound	Open	Matt Stutzman; United States	Ai Xinliang; China	He Zihao; China
Individual recurve	Open	Harvinder Singh; India	Łukasz Ciszek; Poland	Mohammad Reza Ameri; Iran

=== Women's events ===
Event	Class	Gold	Silver	Bronze
Individual	W1	Chen Minyi; China	Šárka Musilová; Czech Republic	Tereza Brandtlová; Czech Republic
Individual compound	Open	Öznur Cüre; Turkey	Fatemeh Hemmati; Iran	Jodie Grinham; Great Britain
Individual recurve	Open	Wu Chunyan; China	Wu Yang; China	Elisabetta Mijno; Italy

=== Mixed events ===
Event	Class	Gold	Silver	Bronze
Team	W1	China; Chen Minyi; Zhang Tianxin	Czech Republic; Šárka Musilová; David Drahonínský	Italy; Daila Dameno; Paolo Tonon
Team compound	Open	Great Britain; Jodie Grinham; Nathan MacQueen	Iran; Fatemeh Hemmati; Hadi Nori	India; Rakesh Kumar; Sheetal Devi
Team recurve	Open	Italy; Elisabetta Mijno; Stefano Travisani	Turkey; Merve Nur Eroglu; Sadik Savas	Slovenia; Ziva Lavrinc; Dejan Fabcic

== Athletics ==
=== Men's events ===
Event	Class	Gold	Silver	Bronze
100 metres	T11	Athanasios Ghavelas; Greece	Timothee Adolphe; France	Di Dongdong; China
100 metres	T12	Noah Malone; United States	Joeferson Marinho; Brazil	Zachary Shaw; Great Britain
100 metres	T13	Skander Djamil Athmani; Algeria	Salum Ageze Kashafali; Norway	Shuta Kawakami; Japan
100 metres	T34	Chaiwat Rattana; Thailand	Walid Ktila; Tunisia	Austin Smeenk; Canada
100 metres	T35	Ihor Tsvietov; Ukraine	Artem Kalashian; Neutral Paralympic Athletes	Dmitrii Safronov; Neutral Paralympic Athletes
100 metres	T36	James Turner; Australia	Alexis Sebastian Chavez; Argentina	Yang Yifei; China
100 metres	T37	Ricardo Mendonça; Brazil	Saptoyogo Purnomo; Indonesia	Andrei Vdovin; Neutral Paralympic Athletes
100 metres	T38	Jaydin Blackwell; United States	Ryan Medrano; United States	Juan Campas; Colombia
100 metres	T44	Mpumelelo Mhlongo; South Africa	Yamel Luis Vives Suares; Cuba	Eddy Bernard; Malaysia
100 metres	T47	Petrúcio Ferreira dos Santos; Brazil	Korban Best; United States	Aymane El Haddaoui; Morocco
100 metres	T51	Cody Fournie; Canada	Peter Genyn; Belgium	Toni Piispanen; Finland
100 metres	T52	Maxime Carabin; Belgium	Marcus Perrineau-Daley; Great Britain	Tomoki Sato; Japan
100 metres	T53	Abdulrahman Al-Qurashi; Saudi Arabia	Pongsakorn Paeyo; Thailand	Ariosvaldo Fernandes da Silva; Brazil
100 metres	T54	Juan Pablo Cervantes Garcia; Mexico	Athiwat Paeng-Nuea; Thailand	Leo-Pekka Tahti; Finland
100 metres	T63	Ezra Frech; United States	Daniel Wagner; Denmark	Vinicius Gonçalves Rodrigues; Brazil
100 metres	T64	Sherman Guity; Costa Rica	Maxcel Amo Manu; Italy	Felix Streng; Germany
200 metres	T35	Ihor Tsvietov; Ukraine	Dmitrii Safronov; Neutral Paralympic Athletes	Artem Kalashian; Neutral Paralympic Athletes
200 metres	T37	Andrei Vdovin; Neutral Paralympic Athletes	Ricardo Mendonça; Brazil	Christian Gabriel Luiz; Brazil
200 metres	T51	Cody Fournie; Canada	Toni Piispanen; Finland	Peter Genyn; Belgium
200 metres	T64	Sherman Guity; Costa Rica	Levi Vloet; Netherlands	Mpumelelo Mhlongo; South Africa
400 metres	T11	Enderson German Santos Gonzalez; Venezuela	Timothée Adolphe; France	Guillaume Junior Atangana; Refugee Paralympic Team
400 metres	T12	Mouncef Bouja; Morocco	Noah Malone; United States	Rouay Jebabli; Tunisia
400 metres	T13	Skander Djamil Athmani; Algeria	Ryota Fukunaga; Japan	Buinder Bermúdez; Colombia
400 metres	T20	Jhon Obando; Colombia	David José Pineda Mejía; Spain	Yovanni Philippe; Mauritius
400 metres	T36	James Turner; Australia	William Stedman; New Zealand	Alexis Sebastian Chavez; Argentina
400 metres	T37	Andrei Vdovin; Neutral Paralympic Athletes	Bartolomeu Chaves; Brazil	Amen Allah Tissaoui; Tunisia
400 metres	T38	Jaydin Blackwell; United States	Ryan Medrano; United States	Juan Campas; Colombia
400 metres	T47	Aymane El Haddaoui; Morocco	Ayoub Sadni; Morocco	Thomaz Ruan de Moraes; Brazil
400 metres	T52	Maxime Carabin; Belgium	Tomoki Sato; Japan	Tomoya Ito; Japan
400 metres	T53	Pongsakorn Paeyo; Thailand	Brent Lakatos; Canada	Brian Siemann; United States
400 metres	T54	Dai Yunqiang; China	Athiwat Paeng-Nuea; Thailand	Daniel Romanchuk; United States
400 metres	T62	Hunter Woodhall; United States	Johannes Floors; Germany	Olivier Hendriks; Netherlands
800 metres	T34	Austin Smeenk; Canada	Chaiwat Rattana; Thailand	Rheed McCracken; Australia
800 metres	T53	Brent Lakatos; Canada	Pongsakorn Paeyo; Thailand	Brian Siemann; United States
800 metres	T54	Jin Hua; China	Dai Yunqiang; China	Marcel Hug; Switzerland
1500 metres	T11	Yeltsin Jacques; Brazil	Yitayal Silesh Yigzaw; Ethiopia	Júlio Cesar Agripino; Brazil
1500 metres	T13	Aleksandr Kostin; Neutral Paralympic Athletes	Rouay Jebabli; Tunisia	Anton Kuliatin; Neutral Paralympic Athletes
1500 metres	T20	Ben Sandilands; Great Britain	Sandro Bessa; Portugal	Michael Brannigan; United States
1500 metres	T38	Amen Allah Tissaoui; Tunisia	Nate Riech; Canada	Reece Langdon; Australia
1500 metres	T46	Aleksandr Iaremchuk; Neutral Paralympic Athletes	Michael Roeger; Australia	Antoine Praud; France
1500 metres	T54	Jin Hua; China	Marcel Hug; Switzerland	Dai Yunqiang; China
5000 metres	T11	Júlio Cesar Agripino; Brazil	Kenya Karasawa; Japan	Yeltsin Jacques; Brazil
5000 metres	T13	Yassine Ouhdadi El Ataby; Spain	Aleksandr Kostin; Neutral Paralympic Athletes	Anton Kuliatin; Neutral Paralympic Athletes
5000 metres	T54	Daniel Romanchuk; United States	Marcel Hug; Switzerland	Faisal Alrajehi; Kuwait
Marathon	T12	Wajdi Boukhili; Tunisia	Alberto Suarez Laso; Spain	El Amin Chentouf; Morocco
Marathon	T54	Marcel Hug; Switzerland	Jin Hua; China	Tomoki Suzuki; Japan
High jump	T47	Roderick Townsend; United States	Nishad Kumar; India	Georgii Margiev; Neutral Paralympic Athletes
High jump	T63	Ezra Frech; United States	Sharad Kumar; India	Mariyappan Thangavelu; India
High jump	T64	Praveen Kumar; India	Derek Loccident; United States	Temurbek Giyazov; Uzbekistan
High jump	T64	Praveen Kumar; India	Derek Loccident; United States	Maciej Lepiato; Poland
Long jump	T11	Di Dongdong; China	Chen Shichang; China	Joan Munar Martínez; Spain
Long jump	T12	Said Najafzade; Azerbaijan	Doniyor Saliev; Uzbekistan	Fernando Vázquez; Argentina
Long jump	T13	Orkhan Aslanov; Azerbaijan	Isaac Jean-Paul; United States	Paulo Henrique Andrade; Brazil
Long jump	T20	Matvei Iakushev; Neutral Paralympic Athletes	Abdul Latif Romly; Malaysia	Jhon Obando; Colombia
Long jump	T36	Evgenii Torsunov; Neutral Paralympic Athletes	Aser Mateus Almeida Ramos; Brazil	Oleksandr Lytvynenko; Ukraine
Long jump	T37	Brian Lionel Impellizzeri; Argentina	Samson Opiyo; Kenya	Mateus Evangelista Cardoso; Brazil
Long jump	T38	Khetag Khinchagov; Neutral Paralympic Athletes	Zhong Huanghao; China	José Lemos; Colombia
Long jump	T47	Robiel Yankiel Sol Cervantes; Cuba	Wang Hao; China	Nikita Kotukov; Neutral Paralympic Athletes
Long jump	T63	Joel de Jong; Netherlands	Daniel Wagner; Denmark	Noah Mbuyamba; Netherlands
Long jump	T64	Markus Rehm; Germany	Derek Loccident; United States	Jarryd Wallace; United States
Shot put	F11	Amirhossein Alipour Darbeid; Iran	Mahdi Olad; Iran	Alvaro del Amo Cano; Spain
Shot put	F12	Elbek Sultonov; Uzbekistan	Volodymyr Ponomarenko; Ukraine	Roman Danyliuk; Ukraine
Shot put	F20	Oleksandr Yarovyi; Ukraine	Muhammad Ziyad Zolkefli; Malaysia	Maksym Koval; Ukraine
Shot put	F32	Athanasios Konstantinidis; Greece	Aleksei Churkin; Neutral Paralympic Athletes	Lazaros Stefanidis; Greece
Shot put	F33	Cai Bingchen; China	Deni Cerni; Croatia	Zakariae Derhem; Morocco
Shot put	F34	Mauricio Valencia; Colombia	Azeddine Nouiri; Morocco	Ahmad Hindi; Jordan
Shot put	F35	Khusniddin Norbekov; Uzbekistan	Hernán Emanuel Urra; Argentina	Seyed Aliasghar Javanmardi; Iran
Shot put	F36	Vladimir Sviridov; Neutral Paralympic Athletes	Alan Kokoity; Neutral Paralympic Athletes	Dastan Mukashbekov; Kazakhstan
Shot put	F37	Kudratillokhon Marufkhujaev; Uzbekistan	Ahmed Ben Moslah; Tunisia	Tolibboy Yuldashev; Uzbekistan
Shot put	F40	Miguel Monteiro; Portugal	Battulga Tsegmid; Mongolia	Garrah Tnaiash; Iraq
Shot put	F41	Bobirjon Omonov; Uzbekistan	Niko Kappel; Germany	Huang Jun; China
Shot put	F46	Greg Stewart; Canada	Sachin Sarjerao Khilari; India	Luka Baković; Croatia
Shot put	F53	Giga Ochkhikidze; Georgia	Abdelillah Gani; Morocco	Alireza Mokhtari; Iran
Shot put	F55	Ruzhdi Ruzhdi; Bulgaria	Zafar Zaker; Iran	Lech Stoltman; Poland
Shot put	F55	Ruzhdi Ruzhdi; Bulgaria	Nebojsa Duric; Serbia	Lech Stoltman; Poland
Shot put	F57	Yasin Khosravi; Iran	Thiago Paulino dos Santos; Brazil	Hokato Hotozhe Sema; India
Shot put	F63	Faisal Sorour; Kuwait	Aled Davies; Great Britain	Tom Habscheid; Luxembourg
Discus throw	F11	Oney Tapia; Italy	Hassan Bajoulvand; Iran	Alvaro del Amo Cano; Spain
Discus throw	F37	Tolibboy Yuldashev; Uzbekistan	Jesse Zesseu; Canada	Haider Ali; Pakistan
Discus throw	F52	Rigivan Ganeshamoorthy; Italy	Aigars Apinis; Latvia	André Rocha; Brazil
Discus throw	F56	Claudiney Batista dos Santos; Brazil	Yogesh Kathuniya; India	Konstantinos Tzounis; Greece
Discus throw	F64	Jeremy Campbell; United States	Akeem Stewart; Trinidad and Tobago	David Blair; United States
Javelin throw	F13	Daniel Pembroke; Great Britain	Ali Pirouj; Iran	Ulicer Aguilera Cruz; Cuba
Javelin throw	F34	Saeid Afrooz; Iran	Mauricio Valencia; Colombia	Diego Meneses; Colombia
Javelin throw	F38	José Lemos; Colombia	Vladyslav Bilyi; Ukraine	An Dongquan; China
Javelin throw	F41	Navdeep Singh; India	Sun Pengxiang; China	Wildan Nukhailawi; Iraq
Javelin throw	F46	Guillermo Varona; Cuba	Ajeet Singh; India	Sundar Singh Gurjar; India
Javelin throw	F54	Ivan Revenko; Neutral Paralympic Athletes	Édgar Fuentes; Mexico	Manolis Stefanoudakis; Greece
Javelin throw	F57	Yorkinbek Odilov; Uzbekistan	Mohammad Khalvandi; Turkey	Cícero Lins; Brazil
Javelin throw	F64	Sumit Antil; India	Dulan Kodithuwakku; Sri Lanka	Michal Burian; Australia
Club throw	F32	Aleksei Churkin; Neutral Paralympic Athletes	Athanasios Konstantinidis; Greece	Ahmed Mehideb; Algeria
Club throw	F51	Dharambir Nain; India	Pranav Soorma; India	Zeljko Dimitrijevic; Serbia

=== Women's events ===
Event	Class	Gold	Silver	Bronze
100 metres	T11	Jerusa Geber dos Santos; Brazil	Liu Cuiqing; China	Lorena Salvatini Spoladore; Brazil
100 metres	T12	Omara Durand; Cuba	Oksana Boturchuk; Ukraine	Katrin Mueller-Rottgardt; Germany
100 metres	T13	Lamiya Valiyeva; Azerbaijan	Rayane Soares da Silva; Brazil	Orla Comerford; Ireland
100 metres	T34	Hannah Cockroft; Great Britain	Kare Adenegan; Great Britain	Lan Hanyu; China
100 metres	T35	Zhou Xia; China	Guo Qianqian; China	Preethi Pal; India
100 metres	T36	Shi Yiting; China	Danielle Aitchison; New Zealand	Veronica Hipolito; Brazil
100 metres	T37	Wen Xiaoyan; China	Taylor Swanson; United States	Jaleen Roberts; United States
100 metres	T38	Karen Palomeque; Colombia	Lida-Maria Manthopoulou; Greece	Darian Faisury Jiménez; Colombia
100 metres	T47	Kiara Rodríguez; Ecuador	Brittni Mason; United States	Anna Grimaldi; New Zealand
100 metres	T53	Samantha Kinghorn; Great Britain	Catherine Debrunner; Switzerland	Gao Fang; China
100 metres	T54	Lea Bayekula; Belgium	Tatyana McFadden; United States	Amanda Kotaja; Finland
100 metres	T63	Martina Caironi; Italy	Karisma Evi Tiarani; Indonesia	Monica Graziana Contrafatto; Italy
100 metres	T63	Martina Caironi; Italy	Karisma Evi Tiarani; Indonesia	Ndidikama Okoh; Great Britain
100 metres	T64	Fleur Jong; Netherlands	Kimberly Alkemade; Netherlands	Marlene van Gansewinkel; Netherlands
200 metres	T11	Jerusa Geber; Brazil	Liu Cuiqing; China	Lahja Ishitile; Namibia
200 metres	T12	Omara Durand; Cuba	Alejandra Paola Pérez López; Venezuela	Simran Sharma; India
200 metres	T35	Zhou Xia; China	Guo Qianqian; China	Preethi Pal; India
200 metres	T36	Shi Yiting; China	Danielle Aitchison; New Zealand	Mali Lovell; Australia
200 metres	T37	Wen Xiaoyan; China	Nataliia Kobzar; Ukraine	Jiang Fenfen; China
200 metres	T47	Anna Grimaldi; New Zealand	Brittni Mason; United States	Sasirawan Inthachot; Thailand
200 metres	T64	Kimberly Alkemade; Netherlands	Marlene van Gansewinkel; Netherlands	Irmgard Bensusan; Germany
400 metres	T11	Lahja Ishitile; Namibia	Thalita Simplício; Brazil	He Shanshan; China
400 metres	T12	Omara Durand; Cuba	Hajar Safarzadeh; Iran	Oksana Boturchuk; Ukraine
400 metres	T13	Rayane Soares; Brazil	Lamiya Valiyeva; Azerbaijan	Carolina Duarte; Portugal
400 metres	T20	Yuliia Shuliar; Ukraine	Aysel Onder; Turkey	Deepthi Jeevanji; India
400 metres	T37	Nataliia Kobzar; Ukraine	Jiang Fenfen; China	Viktoriia Slanova; Neutral Paralympic Athletes
400 metres	T38	Karen Palomeque; Colombia	Luca Ekler; Hungary	Lindy Ave; Germany
400 metres	T47	Fernanda Yara da Silva; Brazil	Lisbeli Vera Andrade; Venezuela	Maria Clara Augusto; Brazil
400 metres	T53	Catherine Debrunner; Switzerland	Samantha Kinghorn; Great Britain	Zhou Hongzhuan; China
400 metres	T54	Lea Bayekula; Belgium	Manuela Schär; Switzerland	Zhou Zhaoqian; China
800 metres	T34	Hannah Cockroft; Great Britain	Kare Adenegan; Great Britain	Eva Houston; United States
800 metres	T53	Catherine Debrunner; Switzerland	Samantha Kinghorn; Great Britain	Zhou Hongzhuan; China
800 metres	T54	Manuela Schär; Switzerland	Zhou Zhaoqian; China	Susannah Scaroni; United States
1500 metres	T11	Yayesh Gate Tesfaw; Ethiopia	He Shanshan; China	Louzanne Coetzee; South Africa
1500 metres	T13	Tigist Mengistu; Ethiopia	Fatima Ezzahra; Morocco	Liza Corso; United States
1500 metres	T20	Barbara Bieganowska-Zajac; Poland	Liudmyla Danylina; Ukraine	Antônia Keyla da Silva; Brazil
1500 metres	T54	Catherine Debrunner; Switzerland	Samantha Kinghorn; Great Britain	Susannah Scaroni; United States
5000 metres	T54	Catherine Debrunner; Switzerland	Susannah Scaroni; United States	Madison de Rozario; Australia
Marathon	T12	Fatima Ezzahra; Morocco	Meryem En-Nourhi; Morocco	Misato Michishita; Japan
Marathon	T54	Catherine Debrunner; Switzerland	Madison de Rozario; Australia	Susannah Scaroni; United States
Long jump	T11	Asila Mirzayorova; Uzbekistan	Zhou Guohua; China	Alba García Falagán; Spain
Long jump	T12	Oksana Zubkovska; Ukraine	Sara Martínez Puntero; Spain	Lynda Hamri; Algeria
Long jump	T20	Karolina Kucharczyk; Poland	Zileide Cassiano; Brazil	Fatma Damla Altın; Turkey
Long jump	T37	Wen Xiaoyan; China	Jaleen Roberts; United States	Manon Genest; France
Long jump	T38	Luca Ekler; Hungary	Nele Moos; Germany	Karen Palomeque; Colombia
Long jump	T47	Kiara Rodriguez; Ecuador	Petra Luterán; Hungary	Bjørk Nørremark; Denmark
Long jump	T63	Vanessa Low; Australia	Martina Caironi; Italy	Elena Kratter; Switzerland
Long jump	T64	Fleur Jong; Netherlands	Marlene van Gansewinkel; Netherlands	Beatriz Hatz; United States
Shot put	F12	Assunta Legnante; Italy	Safiya Burkhanova; Uzbekistan	Zhao Yuping; China
Shot put	F20	Sabrina Fortune; Great Britain	Gloria Agblemagnon; France	Poleth Méndes; Ecuador
Shot put	F32	Anastasiia Moskalenko; Ukraine	Wanna Helena Brito Oliveira; Brazil	Evgeniia Galaktionova; Neutral Paralympic Athletes
Shot put	F33	Wu Qing; China	Gilda Guadalupe Cota Vera; Mexico	Svetlana Krivenok; Neutral Paralympic Athletes
Shot put	F34	Zou Lijuan; China	Lucyna Kornobys; Poland	Saida Amoudi; Morocco
Shot put	F35	Mariia Pomazan; Ukraine	Wang Jun; China	Anna Nicholson; Great Britain
Shot put	F37	Li Yingli; China	Mi Na; China	Irina Vertinskaya; Neutral Paralympic Athletes
Shot put	F40	Lara Baars; Netherlands	Renata Sliwinska; Poland	Raja Jebali; Tunisia
Shot put	F41	Raoua Tlili; Tunisia	Kubaro Khakimova; Uzbekistan	Antonella Ruiz Diaz; Argentina
Shot put	F46	Noelle Malkamaki; United States	Mariia Shpatkivska; Ukraine	Holly Robinson; New Zealand
Shot put	F54	Gloria Zarza; Mexico	Elizabeth Rodrigues Gomes; Brazil	Nurkhon Kurbanova; Uzbekistan
Shot put	F57	Safia Djelal; Algeria	Xu Mian; China	Nassima Saifi; Algeria
Shot put	F64	Yao Juan; China	Arelle Middleton; United States	Yang Yue; China
Discus throw	F11	Zhang Liangmin; China	Assunta Legnante; Italy	Xue Enhui; China
Discus throw	F38	Simone Kruger; South Africa	Li Yingli; China	Xiomara Saldarriaga; Colombia
Discus throw	F41	Raoua Tlili; Tunisia	Youssra Karim; Morocco	Estefany López; Ecuador
Discus throw	F53	Elizabeth Rodrigues Gomes; Brazil	Keiko Onidani; Japan	Zoia Ovsii; Ukraine
Discus throw	F55	Érica Castaño; Colombia	Dong Feixia; China	Rosa María Guerrero; Mexico
Discus throw	F57	Nassima Saifi; Algeria	Xu Mian; China	Mokhigul Khamdamova; Uzbekistan
Discus throw	F64	Yang Yue; China	Yao Juan; China	Osiris Machado; Mexico
Javelin throw	F13	Zhao Yuping; China	Anna Kulinich-Sorokina; Neutral Paralympic Athletes	Natalija Eder; Austria
Javelin throw	F34	Zou Lijuan; China	Zuo Caiyun; China	Dayna Crees; Australia
Javelin throw	F46	Naibys Daniela Morillo Gil; Venezuela	Shahinakhon Yigitalieva; Uzbekistan	Hollie Arnold; Great Britain
Javelin throw	F54	Nurkhon Kurbanova; Uzbekistan	Flora Ugwunwa; Nigeria	Elham Salehi; Iran
Javelin throw	F56	Diāna Krumina; Latvia	Raissa Rocha Machado; Brazil	Lin Sitong; China
Club throw	F32	Maroua Brahmi; Tunisia	Parastoo Habibi; Iran	Giovanna Boscolo; Brazil

=== Mixed events ===
Event	Class	Gold	Silver	Bronze
4 x 100 metres relay	Universal	China; Hu Yang; Wang Hao; Wen Xiaoyan; Zhou Guohua	Great Britain; Jonnie Peacock; Zachary Shaw; Samantha Kinghorn; Ali Smith	United States; Korban Best; Noah Malone; Hunter Woodhall; Tatyana McFadden; Taylor Swanson

== Badminton ==
=== Men's events ===
Event	Class	Gold	Silver	Bronze
Singles	WH1	Qu Zimo; China	Choi Jung-man; South Korea	Thomas Wandschneider; Germany
Singles	WH2	Daiki Kajiwara; Japan	Chan Ho Yuen; Hong Kong	Kim Jung-jun; South Korea
Singles	SL3	Kumar Nitesh; India	Daniel Bethell; Great Britain	Mongkhon Bunsun; Thailand
Singles	SL4	Lucas Mazur; France	Suhas Lalinakere Yathiraj; India	Fredy Setiawan; Indonesia
Singles	SU5	Cheah Liek Hou; Malaysia	Suryo Nugroho; Indonesia	Dheva Anrimusthi; Indonesia
Singles	SH6	Charles Noakes; France	Krysten Coombs; Great Britain	Vitor Tavares; Brazil
Doubles	WH1–WH2	China; Mai Jianpeng; Qu Zimo	South Korea; Jeong Jae-gun; Yu Soo-young	Japan; Daiki Kajiwara; Hiroshi Murayama

=== Women's events ===
Event	Class	Gold	Silver	Bronze
Singles	WH1	Sarina Satomi; Japan	Sujirat Pookkham; Thailand	Yin Menglu; China
Singles	WH2	Liu Yutong; China	Li Hongyan; China	Ilaria Renggli; Switzerland
Singles	SL3	Xiao Zuxian; China	Qonitah Ikhtiar Syakuroh; Indonesia	Mariam Eniola Bolaji; Nigeria
Singles	SL4	Cheng Hefang; China	Leani Ratri Oktila; Indonesia	Helle Sofie Sagøy; Norway
Singles	SU5	Yang Qiuxia; China	Thulasimathi Murugesan; India	Manisha Ramadass; India
Singles	SH6	Li Fengmei; China	Lin Shuangbao; China	Nithya Sre Sivan; India
Doubles	WH1–WH2	China; Liu Yutong; Yin Menglu	Japan; Sarina Satomi; Yuma Yamazaki	Thailand; Sujirat Pookkham; Amnouy Wetwithan

=== Mixed events ===
Event	Class	Gold	Silver	Bronze
Doubles	SL3–SU5	Indonesia; Hikmat Ramdani; Leani Ratri Oktila	Indonesia; Fredy Setiawan; Khalimatus Sadiyah	France; Lucas Mazur; Faustine Noël
Doubles	SH6	China; Lin Naili; Li Fengmei	United States; Miles Krajewski; Jayci Simon	Indonesia; Subhan; Rina Marlina

== Boccia ==
=== Men's events ===
Event	Class	Gold	Silver	Bronze
Individual	BC1	John Loung; Hong Kong	Jung Sung-joon; South Korea	Muhamad Syafa; Indonesia
Individual	BC2	Worawut Saengampa; Thailand	M. Bintang Satria Herlangga; Indonesia	Watcharaphon Vongsa; Thailand
Individual	BC3	Jeong Ho-won; South Korea	Daniel Michel; Australia	Grigorios Polychronidis; Greece
Individual	BC4	Stephen McGuire; Great Britain	Edilson Chica; Colombia	Artem Kolinko; Ukraine

=== Women's events ===
Event	Class	Gold	Silver	Bronze
Individual	BC1	Aurélie Aubert; France	Jeralyn Tan; Singapore	Hiromi Endo; Japan
Individual	BC2	Cristina Gonçalves; Portugal	Jeong So-yeong; South Korea	Gischa Zayana; Indonesia
Individual	BC3	Ho Yuen Kei; Hong Kong	Jamieson Leeson; Australia	Kang Sun-hee; South Korea
Individual	BC4	Lin Ximei; China	Cheung Yuen; Hong Kong	Leidy Chica; Colombia

=== Mixed events ===
Event	Class	Gold	Silver	Bronze
Pair	BC3	Hong Kong; Ho Yuen Kei; Tse Tak Wah	South Korea; Jeong Ho-won; Kang Sun-hee	Argentina; Stefanía Ferrando; Rodrigo Romero
Pair	BC4	Colombia; Leidy Chica; Edilson Chica	Hong Kong; Cheung Yuen; Leung Yuk Wing	Thailand; Pornchok Larpyen; Nuanchan Phonsila
Team	BC1/BC2	China; Lan Zhijian; Yan Zhiqiang; Zhang Qi	Indonesia; Muhamad Syafa; Felix Ardi Yudha; Gischa Zayana	Japan; Hiromi Endo; Takayuki Hirose; Hidetaka Sugimura

== Cycling ==
=== Road ===
==== Men's events ====
Event	Class	Gold	Silver	Bronze
Road race	H1–2	Florian Jouanny; France	Sergio Garrote Munoz; Spain	Luca Mazzone; Italy
Road race	H3	Mathieu Bosredon; France	Johan Quaile; France	Mirko Testa; Italy
Road race	H4	Jetze Plat; Netherlands	Thomas Fruehwirth; Austria	Rafal Wilk; Poland
Road race	H5	Mitch Valize; Netherlands	Loic Vergnaud; France	Pavlo Bal; Ukraine
Road race	C1–3	Fin Graham; Great Britain	Thomas Peyroton-Dartet; France	Alexandre Léauté; France
Road race	C4–5	Yehor Dementyev; Ukraine	Kévin Le Cunff; France	Martin van de Pol; Netherlands
Road race	B	Tristan Bangma; Netherlands	Vincent ter Schure; Netherlands	Alexandre Lloveras; France
Road race	T1–2	Chen Jianxin; China	Dennis Connors; United States	Juan José Betancourt Quiroga; Colombia
Time trial	H1	Fabrizio Cornegliani; Italy	Maxime Hordies; Belgium	Nicolas Pieter du Preez; South Africa
Time trial	H2	Sergio Garrote Munoz; Spain	Luca Mazzone; Italy	Florian Jouanny; France
Time trial	H3	Mathieu Bosredon; France	Johan Quaile; France	Martino Pini; Italy
Time trial	H4	Jetze Plat; Netherlands	Thomas Fruehwirth; Austria	Jonas Van de Steene; Belgium
Time trial	H5	Mitch Valize; Netherlands	Loic Vergnaud; France	Luis Costa; Portugal
Time trial	C1	Ricardo Ten Argiles; Spain	Michael Teuber; Germany	Zbigniew Maciejewski; Poland
Time trial	C2	Alexandre Léauté; France	Ewoud Vromant; Belgium	Darren Hicks; Australia
Time trial	C3	Thomas Peyroton-Dartet; France	Eduardo Santas Asensio; Spain	Matthias Schindler; Germany
Time trial	C4	Kévin Le Cunff; France	Gatien Le Rousseau; France	Damián Ramos; Spain
Time trial	C5	Daniel Abraham Gebru; Netherlands	Alistair Donohoe; Australia	Dorian Foulon; France
Time trial	B	Tristan Bangma; Netherlands	Elie De Carvalho; France	Vincent ter Schure; Netherlands
Time trial	T1–2	Chen Jianxin; China	Nathan Clement; Canada	Tim Celen; Belgium

==== Women's events ====
Event	Class	Gold	Silver	Bronze
Road race	H1–4	Lauren Parker; Australia	Jennette Jansen; Netherlands	Annika Zeyen-Giles; Germany
Road race	H5	Oksana Masters; United States	Sun Bianbian; China	Ana Maria Vitelaru; Italy
Road race	C1–3	Keiko Sugiura; Japan	Flurina Rigling; Switzerland	Clara Brown; United States
Road race	C4–5	Sarah Storey; Great Britain	Heïdi Gaugain; France	Paula Ossa; Colombia
Road race	B	Sophie Unwin; Great Britain	Katie-George Dunlevy; Ireland	Lora Fachie; Great Britain
Road race	T1–2	Emma Lund; Denmark	Celine van Till; Switzerland	Marieke van Soest; Netherlands
Time trial	H1–3	Katerina Brim; United States	Lauren Parker; Australia	Annika Zeyen-Giles; Germany
Time trial	H4–5	Oksana Masters; United States	Chantal Haenen; Netherlands	Sun Bianbian; China
Time trial	C1–3	Maike Hausberger; Germany	Fran Brown; Great Britain	Anna Beck; Sweden
Time trial	C4	Samantha Bosco; United States	Meg Lemon; Australia	Franziska Matile-Dörig; Switzerland
Time trial	C5	Sarah Storey; Great Britain	Heidi Gaugain; France	Alana Forster; Australia
Time trial	B	Katie-George Dunlevy; Ireland	Sophie Unwin; Great Britain	Lora Fachie; Great Britain
Time trial	T1–2	Marieke van Soest; Netherlands	Celine van Till; Switzerland	Emma Lund; Denmark

==== Mixed event ====
Event	Class	Gold	Silver	Bronze
Team relay	H1–5	France; Mathieu Bosredon; Florian Jouanny; Joseph Fritsch	Italy; Federico Mestroni; Luca Mazzone; Mirko Testa	United States; Travis Gaertner; Katerina Brim; Matt Tingley

=== Track ===
==== Men's events ====
Event	Class	Gold	Silver	Bronze
Time trial	B	James Ball; Great Britain	Neil Fachie; Great Britain	Thomas Ulbricht; Germany
Time trial	C1–3	Li Zhangyu; China	Liang Weicong; China	Alexandre Léauté; France
Time trial	C4–5	Korey Boddington; Australia	Blaine Hunt; Great Britain	Alfonso Cabello; Spain
Pursuit	B	Tristan Bangma; Netherlands	Stephen Bate; Great Britain	Lorenzo Bernard; Italy
Pursuit	C1	Li Zhangyu; China	Liang Weicong; China	Ricardo Ten Argilés; Spain
Pursuit	C2	Alexandre Léauté; France	Ewoud Vromant; Belgium	Matthew Robertson; Great Britain
Pursuit	C3	Jaco van Gass; Great Britain	Finlay Graham; Great Britain	Alexandre Hayward; Canada
Pursuit	C4	Jozef Metelka; Slovakia	Archie Atkinson; Great Britain	Gatien Le Rousseau; France
Pursuit	C5	Dorian Foulon; France	Yehor Dementyev; Ukraine	Elouan Gardon; United States

==== Women's events ====
Event	Class	Gold	Silver	Bronze
Time trial	B	Elizabeth Jordan; Great Britain	Jessica Gallagher; Australia	Sophie Unwin; Great Britain
Time trial	C1–3	Amanda Reid; Australia	Qian Wangwei; China	Maike Hausberger; Germany
Time trial	C4–5	Caroline Groot; Netherlands	Marie Patouillet; France	Kate O'Brien; Canada
Pursuit	B	Sophie Unwin; Great Britain	Katie-George Dunlevy; Ireland	Lora Fachie; Great Britain
Pursuit	C1–3	Wang Xiaomei; China	Daphne Schrager; Great Britain	Flurina Rigling; Switzerland
Pursuit	C4	Emily Petricola; Australia	Anna Taylor; New Zealand	Keely Shaw; Canada
Pursuit	C5	Marie Patouillet; France	Heïdi Gaugain; France	Nicole Murray; New Zealand

==== Mixed event ====
Event	Class	Gold	Silver	Bronze
Team sprint	C1–5	Great Britain; Kadeena Cox; Jaco van Gass; Jody Cundy	Spain; Ricardo Ten Argiles; Pablo Jaramillo Gallardo; Alfonso Cabello Llamas	Australia; Gordon Allan; Alistair Donohoe; Korey Boddington

== Equestrian ==
Event	Class	Gold	Silver	Bronze
Individual championship test	Grade I	Rihards Snikus; Latvia	Roxanne Trunnell; United States	Sara Morganti; Italy
Individual freestyle test	Grade I	Rihards Snikus; Latvia	Sara Morganti; Italy	Mari Durward-Akhurst; Great Britain
Individual championship test	Grade II	Fiona Howard; United States	Katrine Kristensen; Denmark	Georgia Wilson; Great Britain
Individual freestyle test	Grade II	Fiona Howard; United States	Georgia Wilson; Great Britain	Heidemarie Dresing; Germany
Individual championship test	Grade III	Rebecca Hart; United States	Rixt van der Horst; Netherlands	Natasha Baker; Great Britain
Individual freestyle test	Grade III	Rebecca Hart; United States	Rixt van der Horst; Netherlands	Natasha Baker; Great Britain
Individual championship test	Grade IV	Demi Haerkens; Netherlands	Sanne Voets; Netherlands	Anna-Lena Niehues; Germany
Individual freestyle test	Grade IV	Demi Haerkens; Netherlands	Anna-Lena Niehues; Germany	Kate Shoemaker; United States
Individual championship test	Grade V	Michele George; Belgium	Regine Mispelkamp; Germany	Sophie Wells; Great Britain
Individual freestyle test	Grade V	Michele George; Belgium	Regine Mispelkamp; Germany	Sophie Wells; Great Britain
Team	Open	United States; Roxanne Trunnell; Fiona Howard; Rebecca Hart	Netherlands; Sanne Voets; Demi Haerkens; Rixt van der Horst	Germany; Anna-Lena Niehues; Regine Mispelkamp; Heidemarie Dresing

== Football 5-a-side ==
Event	Gold	Silver	Bronze
Men's team	France; Alessandro Bartolomucci; Mickael Miguez; Gael Riviere; Hakim Arezki; Martin Baron; Khalifa Youmé; Frédéric Villeroux; Ahmed Tidiane Diakite; Fabrice Morgado; Benoit Chevreau de Montlehu	Argentina; Darío Lencina; Angel Garcia; Nahuel Heredia; Froilan Padilla; Jesus Merlos; Matias Olivera; Maximiliano Espinillo; Osvaldo Fernández; Mario Ríos; Germán Muleck	Brazil; Luan Gonçalves; Maicon Júnior; Cássio Lopes; Jonatan Borges da Silva; Jeferson Gonçalves; Raimundo Nonato Alves Mendes; Tiago da Silva; Ricardo Alves; Jardiel Soares; Matheus Bumussa

== Goalball ==
Event	Gold	Silver	Bronze
Men's tournament	Japan; Yuto Sano; Haruki Torii; Yuji Taguchi; Naoki Hagiwara; Kazuya Kaneko; Koji Miyajiki	Ukraine; Vasyl Oliinik; Anton Strelchyk; Fedir Sydorenko; Yevheniy Tsyhanenko; Rodion Zhyhalin; Oleksandr Toporkov	Brazil; Paulo Saturnino; Leomon Moreno; Josemárcio Sousa; Romário Marques; Emerson Ernesto; André Dantas
Women's tournament	Turkey; Fatma Gul Guler; Reyhan Yilmaz; Sevda Altunoluk; Şeydanur Kaplan; Sevtap Altunoluk; Berfin Altan	Israel; Elham Mahamid Ruzin; Noa Malka; Gal Hamrani; Or Mizrahi; Roni Ohayon; Lihi Ben David	China; Zhang Xiling; Cao Zhenhua; Xu Miao; Wang Chunyan; Ke Peiying; Wang Chunhua

== Judo ==
=== Men's events ===
Event	Class	Gold	Silver	Bronze
60 kg	J1	Abdelkader Bouamer; Algeria	Meysam Banitaba; Iran	Marcos Dennis Blanco; Venezuela
60 kg	J1	Abdelkader Bouamer; Algeria	Meysam Banitaba; Iran	Kapil Parmar; India
73 kg	J1	Alex Bologa; Romania	Yergali Shamey; Kazakhstan	Lennart Sass; Germany
73 kg	J1	Alex Bologa; Romania	Yergali Shamey; Kazakhstan	Djibrilo Iafa; Portugal
90 kg	J1	Arthur Cavalcante da Silva; Brazil	Daniel Powell; Great Britain	Cyril Jonard; France
90 kg	J1	Arthur Cavalcante da Silva; Brazil	Daniel Powell; Great Britain	Oleg Cretul; Moldova
+90 kg	J1	Wilians Silva de Araújo; Brazil	Ion Basoc; Moldova	Jason Grandry; France
+90 kg	J1	Wilians Silva de Araújo; Brazil	Ion Basoc; Moldova	Ilham Zakiyev; Azerbaijan
60 kg	J2	Sherzod Namozov; Uzbekistan	Zurab Zurabiani; Georgia	Ishak Ouldkouider; Algeria
60 kg	J2	Sherzod Namozov; Uzbekistan	Zurab Zurabiani; Georgia	Davyd Khorava; Ukraine
73 kg	J2	Yujiro Seto; Japan	Giorgi Kaldani; Georgia	Uchkun Kuranbaev; Uzbekistan
73 kg	J2	Yujiro Seto; Japan	Giorgi Kaldani; Georgia	Osvaldas Bareikis; Lithuania
90 kg	J2	Oleksandr Nazarenko; Ukraine	Helios Latchoumanaya; France	Marcelo Casanova; Brazil
90 kg	J2	Oleksandr Nazarenko; Ukraine	Helios Latchoumanaya; France	Davurkhon Karomatov; Uzbekistan
+90 kg	J2	Ibrahim Bolukbasi; Turkey	Revaz Chikoidze; Georgia	Zhurkamyrza Shukurbekov; Kazakhstan
+90 kg	J2	Ibrahim Bolukbasi; Turkey	Revaz Chikoidze; Georgia	Chris Skelley; Great Britain

=== Women's events ===
Event	Class	Gold	Silver	Bronze
48 kg	J1	Nataliya Nikolaychyk; Ukraine	Shizuka Hangai; Japan	Rosicleide Silva de Andrade; Brazil
48 kg	J1	Nataliya Nikolaychyk; Ukraine	Shizuka Hangai; Japan	Ecem Taşın; Turkey
57 kg	J1	Shi Yijie; China	Maria Liana Mutia; United States	Anzhela Havrysiuk; Ukraine
57 kg	J1	Shi Yijie; China	Maria Liana Mutia; United States	Paula Gómez; Argentina
70 kg	J1	Liu Li; China	Brenda Souza; Brazil	Theodora Paschalidou; Greece
70 kg	J1	Liu Li; China	Brenda Souza; Brazil	Nicolina Pernheim; Sweden
+70 kg	J1	Anastasiia Harnyk; Ukraine	Erika Zoaga; Brazil	Nazan Akın; Turkey
+70 kg	J1	Anastasiia Harnyk; Ukraine	Erika Zoaga; Brazil	Christella Garcia; United States
48 kg	J2	Akmaral Nauatbek; Kazakhstan	Sandrine Martinet; France	Li Liqing; China
48 kg	J2	Akmaral Nauatbek; Kazakhstan	Sandrine Martinet; France	Cahide Eke; Turkey
57 kg	J2	Junko Hirose; Japan	Kumushkhon Khodjaeva; Uzbekistan	Dayana Fedossova; Kazakhstan
57 kg	J2	Junko Hirose; Japan	Kumushkhon Khodjaeva; Uzbekistan	Marta Arce Payno; Spain
70 kg	J2	Alana Martins Maldonado; Brazil	Wang Yue; China	Kazusa Ogawa; Japan
70 kg	J2	Alana Martins Maldonado; Brazil	Wang Yue; China	Ina Kaldani; Georgia
+70 kg	J2	Rebeca de Souza; Brazil	Sheyla Hernández Estupiñán; Cuba	Wang Hongyu; China
+70 kg	J2	Rebeca de Souza; Brazil	Sheyla Hernández Estupiñán; Cuba	Zarina Raifova; Kazakhstan

== Paracanoeing ==
=== Men's events ===
Event	Class	Gold	Silver	Bronze
Kayak	KL1	Péter Pál Kiss; Hungary	Luis Carlos Cardoso; Brazil	Remy Boulle; France
Kayak	KL2	Curtis McGrath; Australia	David Phillipson; Great Britain	Mykola Syniuk; Ukraine
Kayak	KL3	Brahim Guendouz; Algeria	Dylan Littlehales; Australia	Miquéias Elias Rodrigues; Brazil
Va'a	VL2	Fernando Rufino; Brazil	Igor Tofalini; Brazil	Blake Haxton; United States
Va'a	VL3	Vladyslav Yepifanov; Ukraine	Jack Eyers; Great Britain	Peter Cowan; New Zealand

=== Women's events ===
Event	Class	Gold	Silver	Bronze
Kayak	KL1	Katherinne Wollermann; Chile	Maryna Mazhula; Ukraine	Edina Müller; Germany
Kayak	KL2	Charlotte Henshaw; Great Britain	Emma Wiggs; Great Britain	Anja Adler; Germany
Kayak	KL3	Laura Sugar; Great Britain	Nelia Barbosa; France	Felicia Laberer; Germany
Va'a	VL2	Emma Wiggs; Great Britain	Brianna Hennessy; Canada	Susan Seipel; Australia
Va'a	VL3	Charlotte Henshaw; Great Britain	Hope Gordon; Great Britain	Zhong Yongyuan; China

== Paratriathlon ==
=== Men's events ===
Event	Class	Gold	Silver	Bronze
Individual	PTWC	Jetze Plat; Netherlands	Florian Brungraber; Austria	Geert Schipper; Netherlands
Individual	PTS2	Jules Ribstein; France	Mohamed Lahna; United States	Mark Barr; United States
Individual	PTS3	Daniel Molina; Spain	Max Gelhaar; Germany	Nico van der Burgt; Netherlands
Individual	PTS4	Alexis Hanquinquant; France	Carson Clough; United States	Nil Riudavets; Spain
Individual	PTS5	Chris Hammer; United States	Ronan Cordeiro; Brazil	Martin Schulz; Germany
Individual	PTVI	Dave Ellis; Great Britain	Thibaut Rigaudeau; France	Antoine Perel; France

=== Women's events ===
Event	Class	Gold	Silver	Bronze
Individual	PTWC	Lauren Parker; Australia	Kendall Gretsch; United States	Leanne Taylor; Canada
Individual	PTS2	Hailey Danz; United States	Veronica Yoko Plebani; Italy	Allysa Seely; United States
Individual	PTS4	Megan Richter; Great Britain	Marta Francés Gómez; Spain	Hannah Moore; Great Britain
Individual	PTS5	Grace Norman; United States	Claire Cashmore; Great Britain	Lauren Steadman; Great Britain
Individual	PTVI	Susana Rodríguez; Spain	Francesca Tarantello; Italy	Anja Renner; Germany

== Powerlifting ==
=== Men's events ===
Event	Gold	Silver	Bronze
49 kg	Omar Qarada; Jordan	Abdullah Kayapınar; Turkey	Lê Văn Công; Vietnam
54 kg	David Degtyarev; Kazakhstan	Pablo Ramírez Barrientos; Cuba	Yang Jinglang; China
59 kg	Mohamed Elmenyawy; Egypt	Qi Yongkai; China	Mohsen Bakhtiar; Iran
65 kg	Zou Yi; China	Mark Swan; Great Britain	Hocine Bettir; Algeria
72 kg	Bonnie Bunyau Gustin; Malaysia	Hu Peng; China	Donato Telesca; Italy
80 kg	Roohallah Rostami; Iran	Gu Xiaofei; China	Rasool Mohsin; Iraq
88 kg	Yan Panpan; China	Mohamed Elelfat; Egypt	Yurii Babynets; Ukraine
97 kg	Abdelkareem Khattab; Jordan	Ye Jixiong; China	Fabio Torres; Colombia
107 kg	Aliakbar Gharibshahi; Iran	Sodnompiljee Enkhbayar; Mongolia	José de Jesús Castillo; Mexico
+107 kg	Ahmad Aminzadeh; Iran	Anton Kriukov; Ukraine	Akaki Jintcharadze; Georgia

=== Women's events ===
Event	Gold	Silver	Bronze
41 kg	Cui Zhe; China	Esther Nworgu; Nigeria	Lara Aparecida de Lima; Brazil
45 kg	Guo Lingling; China	Zoe Newson; Great Britain	Nazmiye Muratli; Turkey
50 kg	Clara Fuentes Monasterio; Venezuela	Xiao Jinping; China	Olivia Broome; Great Britain
55 kg	Rehab Ahmed; Egypt	Besra Duman; Turkey	Kamolpan Kraratpet; Thailand
61 kg	Onyinyechi Mark; Nigeria	Cui Jianjin; China	Amalia Perez Vazquez; Mexico
67 kg	Tan Yujiao; China	Fatma Elyan; Egypt	Maria de Fátima Castro; Brazil
73 kg	Mariana D'Andrea; Brazil	Ruza Kuzieva; Uzbekistan	Sibel Çam; Turkey
79 kg	Han Miaoyu; China	Bose Omolayo; Nigeria	Safaa Hassan; Egypt
86 kg	Tayana Medeiros; Brazil	Zheng Feifei; China	Marion Serrano; Chile
+86 kg	Folashade Oluwafemiayo; Nigeria	Deng Xuemei; China	Nadia Ali; Egypt

== Rowing ==
Event	Class	Gold	Silver	Bronze
Men's single sculls	PR1	Benjamin Pritchard; Great Britain	Roman Polianskyi; Ukraine	Giacomo Perini; Italy
Women's single sculls	PR1	Moran Samuel; Israel	Birgit Skarstein; Norway	Nathalie Benoit; France
Mixed double sculls	PR2	Great Britain; Lauren Rowles; Gregg Stevenson	China; Liu Shuang; Jiang Jijian	Israel; Shahar Milfelder; Saleh Shahin
Mixed double sculls	PR3	Australia; Nikki Ayers; Jed Altschwager	Great Britain; Sam Murray; Annie Caddick	Germany; Jan Helmich; Hermine Krumbein
Mixed coxed four	PR3	Great Britain; Francesca Allen; Giedrė Rakauskaitė; Josh O'Brien; Ed Fuller; Erin Kennedy	United States; Skylar Dahl; Gemma Wollenschlaeger; Alex Flynn; Ben Washburne; Emelie Eldracher	France; Candyce Chafa; Rémy Taranto; Grégoire Bireau; Margot Boulet; Émilie Acquistapace

== Shooting ==
=== Men's events ===
Event	Class	Gold	Silver	Bronze
10 m air rifle standing	SH1	Park Jin-ho; South Korea	Yerkin Gabbasov; Kazakhstan	Martin Black Jørgensen; Denmark
50 m rifle 3 positions	SH1	Park Jin-ho; South Korea	Dong Chao; China	Marek Dobrowolski; Poland
10 m air pistol	SH1	Jo Jeong-du; South Korea	Manish Narwal; India	Yang Chao; China

=== Women's events ===
Event	Class	Gold	Silver	Bronze
10 m air rifle standing	SH1	Avani Lekhara; India	Lee Yun-ri; South Korea	Mona Agarwal; India
50 m rifle 3 positions	SH1	Natascha Hiltrop; Germany	Veronika Vadovičová; Slovakia	Zhang Cuiping; China
10 m air pistol	SH1	Sareh Javanmardi; Iran	Aysel Özgan; Turkey	Rubina Francis; India

=== Mixed events ===
Event	Class	Gold	Silver	Bronze
10 m air rifle prone	SH1	Veronika Vadovičová; Slovakia	Radoslav Malenovský; Slovakia	Juan Antonio Saavedra Reinaldo; Spain
50 m rifle prone	SH1	Natascha Hiltrop; Germany	Anna Normann; Sweden	Jean-Louis Michaud; France
25 m pistol	SH1	Yang Chao; China	Yan Xiao Gong; United States	Kim Jung-nam; South Korea
50 m pistol	SH1	Yang Chao; China	Server Ibragimov; Uzbekistan	Davide Franceschetti; Italy
10 m air rifle standing	SH2	Franček Gorazd Tiršek; Slovenia	Tanguy de La Forest; France	Seo Hun-tae; South Korea
10 m air rifle prone	SH2	Tanguy de La Forest; France	Alexandre Galgani; Brazil	Mika Mizuta; Japan
50 m rifle prone	SH2	Dragan Ristić; Serbia	Vladimer Tchintcharauli; Georgia	Tim Jeffery; Great Britain

== Sitting volleyball ==
Event	Gold	Silver	Bronze
Men's team	Iran; Hamidreza Abbasifeshki; Morteza Mehrzad; Meisam Ali Pour; Davoud Alipourian; Meysam Hajibabaei Movahhed; Mohammad Nemati; Sadegh Bigdeli; Majid Lashkarisanami; Hossein Golestani; Isa Zirahi; Ramezan Salehihajikolaei; Mahdi Babadi	Bosnia and Herzegovina; Ismet Godinjak; Adnan Manko; Stevan Crnobrnja; Armin Šehić; Asim Medić; Mirzet Duran; Nizam Čančar; Dževad Hamzić; Edin Dino; Safet Alibašić; Sabahudin Delalić; Ermin Jusufović	Egypt; Hesham Elshwikh; Mohamed Hamdy Elsoudany; Ashraf Zaghloul Abdelaziz Abdalla; Ahmed Mohammed Soliman Khamis; Ahmed Mohammed Fadl; Hossam Massoud; Elsayed Moussa Saad Moussa; Abdelnaby Hassan Ahmed Abdellatif; Zakareia Abdo; Mohamed Abouelyazeid; Ahmed Zikry; Metawa Abouelkhir
Women's team	United States; Heather Erickson; Monique Matthews; Whitney Dosty; Kaleo Kanahele Maclay; Lora Webster; Nicky Nieves; Tia Edwards; Bethany Zummo; Alexis Shifflett; Sydney Satchell; Katie Holloway Bridge; Emma Schieck	China; Lyu Hongqin; Zhao Meiling; Qiu Junfei; Zhang Xufei; Li Ting; Huang Lu; Wang Yanan; Zhang Lijun; Su Limei; Tang Xuemei; Xu Yixiao; Hu Huizi	Canada; Julie Kozun; Danielle Ellis; Jennifer Oakes; Anne Fergusson; Jolan Wong; Sarah Melenka; Heidi Peters; Katelyn Wright; Felicia Voss-Shafiq; Jennifer McCreesh; Allison Lang

== Swimming ==
=== Men's events ===
Event	Class	Gold	Silver	Bronze
50 metre freestyle	S3	Umut Unlu; Turkey	Denys Ostapchenko; Ukraine	Josia Topf; Germany
50 metre freestyle	S4	Sebastian Massabie; Canada	Takayuki Suzuki; Japan	Ami Omer Dadaon; Israel
50 metre freestyle	S5	Guo Jincheng; China	Yuan Weiyi; China	Wang Lichao; China
50 metre freestyle	S7	Andrii Trusov; Ukraine	Carlos Serrano Zárate; Colombia	Egor Efrosinin; Neutral Paralympic Athletes
50 metre freestyle	S9	Simone Barlaam; Italy	Denis Tarasov; Neutral Paralympic Athletes	Fredrik Solberg; Norway
50 metre freestyle	S10	Thomas Gallagher; Australia	Phelipe Rodrigues; Brazil	Rowan Crothers; Australia
50 metre freestyle	S11	Keiichi Kimura; Japan	Hua Dongdong; China	none awarded (as there was a tie for silver)
50 metre freestyle	S11	Keiichi Kimura; Japan	Wendell Belarmino; Brazil	none awarded (as there was a tie for silver)
50 metre freestyle	S13	Ihar Boki; Neutral Paralympic Athletes	Illia Yaremenko; Ukraine	Oleksii Virchenko; Ukraine
100 metre freestyle	S4	Ami Omer Dadaon; Israel	Takayuki Suzuki; Japan	Angel de Jesus Camacho Ramirez; Mexico
100 metre freestyle	S5	Oleksandr Komarov; Ukraine	Guo Jincheng; China	Kirill Pulver; Neutral Paralympic Athletes
100 metre freestyle	S6	Antonio Fantin; Italy	Talisson Glock; Brazil	Laurent Chardard; France
100 metre freestyle	S8	Callum Simpson; Australia	Noah Jaffe; United States	Alberto Amodeo; Italy
100 metre freestyle	S10	Stefano Raimondi; Italy	Rowan Crothers; Australia	Thomas Gallagher; Australia
100 metre freestyle	S12	Yaroslav Denysenko; Ukraine	Maksym Veraksa; Ukraine	Raman Salei; Azerbaijan
200 metre freestyle	S2	Gabriel Araújo; Brazil	Vladimir Danilenko; Neutral Paralympic Athletes	Alberto Abarza; Chile
200 metre freestyle	S3	Umut Unlu; Turkey	Denys Ostapchenko; Ukraine	Serhii Palamarchuk; Ukraine
200 metre freestyle	S4	Ami Omer Dadaon; Israel	Roman Zhdanov; Neutral Paralympic Athletes	Takayuki Suzuki; Japan
200 metre freestyle	S5	Francesco Bocciardo; Italy	Kirill Pulver; Neutral Paralympic Athletes	Oleksandr Komarov; Ukraine
200 metre freestyle	S14	William Ellard; Great Britain	Nicholas Bennett; Canada	Jack Ireland; Australia
400 metre freestyle	S6	Talisson Glock; Brazil	Antonio Fantin; Italy	Jesús Alberto Gutiérrez; Mexico
400 metre freestyle	S7	Federico Bicelli; Italy	Andrii Trusov; Ukraine	Iñaki Basiloff; Argentina
400 metre freestyle	S8	Alberto Amodeo; Italy	Reid Maxwell; Canada	Andrei Nikolaev; Neutral Paralympic Athletes
400 metre freestyle	S9	Ugo Didier; France	Simone Barlaam; Italy	Brenden Hall; Australia
400 metre freestyle	S11	David Kratochvil; Czech Republic	Rogier Dorsman; Netherlands	Uchu Tomita; Japan
400 metre freestyle	S13	Ihar Boki; Neutral Paralympic Athletes	Alex Portal; France	Kylian Portal; France
50 metre backstroke	S1	Kamil Otowski; Poland	Francesco Bettella; Italy	Anton Kol; Ukraine
50 metre backstroke	S2	Gabriel Araújo; Brazil	Vladimir Danilenko; Neutral Paralympic Athletes	Alberto Abarza; Chile
50 metre backstroke	S3	Denys Ostapchenko; Ukraine	Josia Topf; Germany	Serhii Palamarchuk; Ukraine
50 metre backstroke	S4	Roman Zhdanov; Neutral Paralympic Athletes	Angel de Jesus Camacho Ramirez; Mexico	Arnost Petracek; Czech Republic
50 metre backstroke	S5	Yuan Weiyi; China	Guo Jincheng; China	Wang Lichao; China
100 metre backstroke	S1	Kamil Otowski; Poland	Anton Kol; Ukraine	Francesco Bettella; Italy
100 metre backstroke	S2	Gabriel Araújo; Brazil	Vladimir Danilenko; Neutral Paralympic Athletes	Alberto Abarza; Chile
100 metre backstroke	S6	Yang Hong; China	Wang Jingang; China	Dino Sinovcic; Croatia
100 metre backstroke	S7	Yurii Shenhur; Ukraine	Andrii Trusov; Ukraine	Federico Bicelli; Italy
100 metre backstroke	S8	Iñigo Llopis Sanz; Spain	Kota Kubota; Japan	Mark Malyar; Israel
100 metre backstroke	S9	Yahor Shchalkanau; Neutral Paralympic Athletes	Ugo Didier; France	Bogdan Mozgovoi; Neutral Paralympic Athletes
100 metre backstroke	S10	Olivier van de Voort; Netherlands	Stefano Raimondi; Italy	Thomas Gallagher; Australia
100 metre backstroke	S11	Mykhailo Serbin; Ukraine	David Kratochvil; Czech Republic	Danylo Chufarov; Ukraine
100 metre backstroke	S12	Stephen Clegg; Great Britain	Raman Salei; Azerbaijan	Iaroslav Denysenko; Ukraine
100 metre backstroke	S13	Ihar Boki; Neutral Paralympic Athletes	Vladimir Sotnikov; Neutral Paralympic Athletes	Alex Portal; France
100 metre backstroke	S14	Benjamin Hance; Australia	Gabriel Bandeira; Brazil	Mark Tompsett; Great Britain
50 metre breaststroke	SB2	Arnulfo Castorena; Mexico	Ismail Barlov; Bosnia and Herzegovina	Grant Patterson; Australia
50 metre breaststroke	SB3	Takayuki Suzuki; Japan	Efrem Morelli; Italy	Miguel Luque; Spain
100 metre breaststroke	SB4	Dmitrii Cherniaev; Neutral Paralympic Athletes	Antonios Tsapatakis; Greece	Manuel Mateo Bortuzzo; Italy
100 metre breaststroke	SB5	Leo McCrea; Switzerland	Antoni Ponce Bertran; Spain	Danylo Semenykhin; Ukraine
100 metre breaststroke	SB6	Yang Hong; China	Nelson Crispín; Colombia	Ievgenii Bogodaiko; Ukraine
100 metre breaststroke	SB8	Andrei Kalina; Neutral Paralympic Athletes	Yang Guanglong; China	Carlos Serrano Zárate; Colombia
100 metre breaststroke	SB9	Stefano Raimondi; Italy	Hector Denayer; France	Maurice Wetekam; Germany
100 metre breaststroke	SB11	Rogier Dorsman; Netherlands	Yang Bozun; China	Danylo Chufarov; Ukraine
100 metre breaststroke	SB13	Taliso Engel; Germany	Nurdaulet Zhumagali; Kazakhstan	Vali Israfilov; Azerbaijan
100 metre breaststroke	SB14	Nicholas Bennett; Canada	Jake Michel; Australia	Naohide Yamaguchi; Japan
50 metre butterfly	S5	Guo Jincheng; China	Yuan Weiyi; China	Wang Lichao; China
50 metre butterfly	S6	Wang Jingang; China	Nelson Crispín; Colombia	Laurent Chardard; France
50 metre butterfly	S7	Andrii Trusov; Ukraine	Carlos Serrano Zárate; Colombia	Egor Efrosinin; Neutral Paralympic Athletes
100 metre butterfly	S8	Alberto Amodeo; Italy	Wu Hongliang; China	Yang Guanglong; China
100 metre butterfly	S9	Simone Barlaam; Italy	Timothy Hodge; Australia	Lewis Bishop; Australia
100 metre butterfly	S10	Stefano Raimondi; Italy	Ihor Nimchenko; Ukraine	Alex Saffy; Australia
100 metre butterfly	S11	Keiichi Kimura; Japan	Danylo Chufarov; Ukraine	Uchu Tomita; Japan
100 metre butterfly	S12	Stephen Clegg; Great Britain	Dzmitry Salei; Neutral Paralympic Athletes	Raman Salei; Azerbaijan
100 metre butterfly	S13	Ihar Boki; Neutral Paralympic Athletes	Alex Portal; France	Enrique José Alhambra Mollar; Spain
100 metre butterfly	S14	Alexander Hillhouse; Denmark	William Ellard; Great Britain	Gabriel Bandeira; Brazil
150 metre individual medley	SM3	Josia Topf; Germany	Ahmed Kelly; Australia	Grant Patterson; Australia
150 metre individual medley	SM4	Roman Zhdanov; Neutral Paralympic Athletes	Ami Omer Dadaon; Israel	Angel de Jesus Camacho Ramirez; Mexico
200 metre individual medley	SM6	Yang Hong; China	Nelson Crispín; Colombia	Talisson Glock; Brazil
200 metre individual medley	SM7	Iñaki Basiloff; Argentina	Andrii Trusov; Ukraine	Ievgenii Bogodaiko; Ukraine
200 metre individual medley	SM8	Xu Haijiao; China	Yang Guanglong; China	Diogo Cancela; Portugal
200 metre individual medley	SM9	Timothy Hodge; Australia	Ugo Didier; France	Hector Denayer; France
200 metre individual medley	SM10	Stefano Raimondi; Italy	Col Pearse; Australia	Ihor Nimchenko; Ukraine
200 metre individual medley	SM11	Rogier Dorsman; Netherlands	Danylo Chufarov; Ukraine	David Kratochvil; Czech Republic
200 metre individual medley	SM13	Ihar Boki; Neutral Paralympic Athletes	Alex Portal; France	Vladimir Sotnikov; Neutral Paralympic Athletes
200 metre individual medley	SM14	Nicholas Bennett; Canada	Rhys Darbey; Great Britain	Ricky Betar; Australia

=== Women's events ===
Event	Class	Gold	Silver	Bronze
50 metre freestyle	S4	Leanne Smith; United States	Tanja Scholz; Germany	Rachael Watson; Australia
50 metre freestyle	S6	Jiang Yuyan; China	Elizabeth Marks; United States	Anna Hontar; Ukraine
50 metre freestyle	S8	Alice Tai; Great Britain	Cecília Jerônimo; Brazil	Viktoriia Ishchiulova; Neutral Paralympic Athletes
50 metre freestyle	S10	Chen Yi; China	Christie Raleigh-Crossley; United States	Aurélie Rivard; Canada
50 metre freestyle	S11	Ma Jia; China	Karolina Pelendritou; Cyprus	Maryna Piddubna; Ukraine
50 metre freestyle	S13	Carol Santiago; Brazil	Gia Pergolini; United States	Carlotta Gilli; Italy
100 metre freestyle	S3	Leanne Smith; United States	Marta Fernandez Infante; Spain	Rachael Watson; Australia
100 metre freestyle	S5	Tully Kearney; Great Britain	Iryna Poida; Ukraine	Monica Boggioni; Italy
100 metre freestyle	S7	Jiang Yuyan; China	Morgan Stickney; United States	Giulia Terzi; Italy
100 metre freestyle	S9	Alexa Leary; Australia	Christie Raleigh-Crossley; United States	Mariana Ribeiro; Brazil
100 metre freestyle	S10	Emeline Pierre; France	Aurélie Rivard; Canada	Alessia Scortechini; Italy
100 metre freestyle	S11	Daria Lukianenko; Neutral Paralympic Athletes	Liesette Bruinsma; Netherlands	Zhang Xiaotong; China
100 metre freestyle	S12	Carol Santiago; Brazil	Anna Stetsenko; Ukraine	Ayano Tsujiuchi; Japan
200 metre freestyle	S5	Tully Kearney; Great Britain	Iryna Poida; Ukraine	Monica Boggioni; Italy
200 metre freestyle	S14	Valeriia Shabalina; Neutral Paralympic Athletes	Poppy Maskill; Great Britain	Louise Fiddes; Great Britain
400 metre freestyle	S6	Jiang Yuyan; China	Nora Meister; Switzerland	Maisie Summers-Newton; Great Britain
400 metre freestyle	S7	Morgan Stickney; United States	McKenzie Coan; United States	Giulia Terzi; Italy
400 metre freestyle	S8	Jessica Long; United States	Alice Tai; Great Britain	Xenia Francesca Palazzo; Italy
400 metre freestyle	S9	Zsófia Konkoly; Hungary	Lakeisha Patterson; Australia	Vittoria Bianco; Italy
400 metre freestyle	S10	Aurélie Rivard; Canada	Alexandra Truwit; United States	Bianka Pap; Hungary
400 metre freestyle	S11	Liesette Bruinsma; Netherlands	Zhang Xiaotong; China	Daria Lukianenko; Neutral Paralympic Athletes
400 metre freestyle	S13	Olivia Chambers; United States	Carlotta Gilli; Italy	Anna Stetsenko; Ukraine
50 metre backstroke	S2	Yip Pin Xiu; Singapore	Haideé Aceves; Mexico	Teresa Perales; Spain
50 metre backstroke	S3	Ellie Challis; Great Britain	Zoia Shchurova; Neutral Paralympic Athletes	Marta Fernandez Infante; Spain
50 metre backstroke	S4	Alexandra Stamatopoulou; Greece	Gina Boettcher; Germany	Lidia Vieira da Cruz; Brazil
50 metre backstroke	S5	Lu Dong; China	He Shenggao; China	Liu Yu; China
100 metre backstroke	S2	Yip Pin Xiu; Singapore	Haideé Aceves; Mexico	Angela Procida; Italy
100 metre backstroke	S6	Jiang Yuyan; China	Elizabeth Marks; United States	Shelby Newkirk; Canada
100 metre backstroke	S8	Alice Tai; Great Britain	Viktoriia Ishchiulova; Neutral Paralympic Athletes	Mira Jeanne Maack; Germany
100 metre backstroke	S9	Christie Raleigh-Crossley; United States	Núria Marquès; Spain	Mariana Ribeiro; Brazil
100 metre backstroke	S10	Bianka Pap; Hungary	Alexandra Truwit; United States	Emeline Pierre; France
100 metre backstroke	S11	Cai Liwen; China	Li Guizhi; China	Daria Lukianenko; Neutral Paralympic Athletes
100 metre backstroke	S12	Carol Santiago; Brazil	Anna Stetsenko; Ukraine	María Delgado Nadal; Spain
100 metre backstroke	S13	Gia Pergolini; United States	Roisin Ni Riain; Ireland	Carlotta Gilli; Italy
100 metre backstroke	S14	Poppy Maskill; Great Britain	Valeriia Shabalina; Neutral Paralympic Athletes	Olivia Newman-Baronius; Great Britain
50 metre breaststroke	SB3	Monica Boggioni; Italy	Patrícia Pereira; Brazil	Marta Fernandez Infante; Spain
100 metre breaststroke	SB4	Giulia Ghiretti; Italy	Fanni Illés; Hungary	Cheng Jiao; China
100 metre breaststroke	SB5	Grace Harvey; Great Britain	Zhang Li; China	Anna Hontar; Ukraine
100 metre breaststroke	SB6	Maisie Summers-Newton; Great Britain	Liu Daomin; China	Ng Cheuk-yan; Hong Kong
100 metre breaststroke	SB7	Mariia Pavlova; Italy	Iona Winnifrith; Great Britain	Tess Routliffe; Canada
100 metre breaststroke	SB8	Anastasiya Dmytriv; Spain	Brock Whiston; Great Britain	Viktoriia Ishchiulova; Neutral Paralympic Athletes
100 metre breaststroke	SB9	Chantalle Zijderveld; Netherlands	Zhang Meng; China	Lisa Kruger; Netherlands
100 metre breaststroke	SB11	Daria Lukianenko; Neutral Paralympic Athletes	Ma Jia; China	Karolina Pelendritou; Cyprus
100 metre breaststroke	SB12	Elena Krawzow; Germany	Carol Santiago; Brazil	Zheng Jietong; China
100 metre breaststroke	SB13	Rebecca Redfern; Great Britain	Olivia Chambers; United States	Colleen Young; United States
100 metre breaststroke	SB14	Louise Fiddes; Great Britain	Débora Borges Carneiro; Brazil	Beatriz Borges Carneiro; Brazil
50 metre butterfly	S5	Lu Dong; China	He Shenggao; China	Sevilay Ozturk; Turkey
50 metre butterfly	S6	Jiang Yuyan; China	Liu Daomin; China	Mayara Petzold; Brazil
50 metre butterfly	S7	Danielle Dorris; Canada	Mallory Weggemann; United States	Giulia Terzi; Italy
100 metre butterfly	S8	Jessica Long; United States	Viktoriia Ishchiulova; Neutral Paralympic Athletes	Alice Tai; Great Britain
100 metre butterfly	S9	Christie Raleigh-Crossley; United States	Zsófia Konkoly; Hungary	Emily Beecroft; Australia
100 metre butterfly	S10	Faye Rogers; Great Britain	Callie-Ann Warrington; Great Britain	Katie Cosgriffe; Canada
100 metre butterfly	S13	Carlotta Gilli; Italy	Grace Nuhfer; United States	Muslima Odilova; Uzbekistan
100 metre butterfly	S14	Poppy Maskill; Great Britain	Chan Yui-lam; Hong Kong	Valeriia Shabalina; Neutral Paralympic Athletes
150 metre individual medley	SM4	Tanja Scholz; Germany	Nataliia Butkova; Neutral Paralympic Athletes	Lidia Vieira da Cruz; Brazil
200 metre individual medley	SM5	He Shenggao; China	Lu Dong; China	Cheng Jiao; China
200 metre individual medley	SM6	Maisie Summers-Newton; Great Britain	Elizabeth Marks; United States	Liu Daomin; China
200 metre individual medley	SM7	Mallory Weggemann; United States	Tess Routliffe; Canada	Julia Gaffney; United States
200 metre individual medley	SM8	Brock Whiston; Great Britain	Viktoriia Ishchiulova; Neutral Paralympic Athletes	Alice Tai; Great Britain
200 metre individual medley	SM9	Zsófia Konkoly; Hungary	Núria Marquès; Spain	Anastasiya Dmytriv; Spain
200 metre individual medley	SM10	Zhang Meng; China	Bianka Pap; Hungary	Lisa Kruger; Netherlands
200 metre individual medley	SM11	Daria Lukianenko; Neutral Paralympic Athletes	Ma Jia; China	Cai Liwen; China
200 metre individual medley	SM13	Carlotta Gilli; Italy	Olivia Chambers; United States	Roisin Ni Riain; Ireland
200 metre individual medley	SM14	Valeriia Shabalina; Neutral Paralympic Athletes	Poppy Maskill; Great Britain	Aira Kinoshita; Japan

=== Mixed events ===
Event	Class	Gold	Silver	Bronze
4 x 50 metre relay	Freestyle 20pts	China; Peng Qiuping; Yuan Weiyi; Jiang Yuyan; Guo Jincheng; Wang Lichao; He Shenggao; Lu Dong	United States; Abbas Karimi; Elizabeth Marks; Zachary Shattuck; Leanne Smith	Brazil; Talisson Glock; Patrícia Pereira; Lídia Vieira da Cruz; Daniel Xavier; Samuel da Silva
4 x 50 metre relay	Medley 20pts	China; Zou Liankang; Wang Jingang; Jiang Yuyan; Guo Jincheng; Wang Lichao; Zhang Li; Lu Dong; Yao Cuan	United States; Abbas Karimi; Elizabeth Marks; Morgan Ray; Leanne Smith	Ukraine; Denys Ostapchenko; Anna Hontar; Iaroslav Semenenko; Veronika Korzhova; Oleksandr Komarov; Iryna Poida
4 x 100 metre relay	Freestyle S14	Great Britain; William Ellard; Rhys Darbey; Poppy Maskill; Olivia Newman-Baronius	Australia; Jack Ireland; Madeleine McTernan; Ruby Storm; Benjamin Hance	Brazil; Arthur Xavier; Gabriel Bandeira; Beatriz Borges Carneiro; Ana Karolina Soares
4 x 100 metre relay	Freestyle 49pts	Ukraine; Maryna Piddubna; Oleksii Virchenko; Anna Stetsenko; Yaroslav Denysenko	Brazil; Matheus Rheine; Douglas Matera; Lucilene Sousa; Carol Santiago	Spain; Jose Ramon Cantero Elvira; María Delgado Nadal; Emma Feliu Martin; Enrique José Alhambra Mollar
4 x 100 metre relay	Freestyle 34pts	Italy; Stefano Raimondi; Giulia Terzi; Xenia Francesca Palazzo; Simone Barlaam	Australia; Alexa Leary; Callum Simpson; Chloe Osborn; Rowan Crothers	United States; Matthew Torres; Noah Jaffe; Natalie Sims; Christie Raleigh-Crossley
4 x 100 metre relay	Medley 34pts	Australia; Jesse Aungles; Timothy Hodge; Emily Beecroft; Alexa Leary; Keira Stephens; Callum Simpson	Netherlands; Olivier van de Voort; Chantalle Zijderveld; Florianne Bultje; Thijs van Hofweegen	Spain; Núria Marquès; Oscar Salguero Galisteo; Iñigo Llopis Sanz; Sarai Gascón; Anastasiya Dmytriv; José Antonio Mari

== Table tennis ==
=== Men's events ===
Event	Class	Gold	Silver	Bronze
Singles	MS1	Yunier Fernández; Cuba	Robert Davies; Great Britain	Federico Falco; Italy
Singles	MS1	Yunier Fernández; Cuba	Robert Davies; Great Britain	Endre Major; Hungary
Singles	MS2	Rafal Czuper; Poland	Jiří Suchánek; Czech Republic	Fabien Lamirault; France
Singles	MS2	Rafal Czuper; Poland	Jiří Suchánek; Czech Republic	Cha Soo-yong; South Korea
Singles	MS3	Feng Panfeng; China	Thomas Schmidberger; Germany	Yuttajak Glinbancheun; Thailand
Singles	MS3	Feng Panfeng; China	Thomas Schmidberger; Germany	Jang Yeong-jin; South Korea
Singles	MS4	Kim Young-gun; South Korea	Wanchai Chaiwut; Thailand	Kim Jung-gil; South Korea
Singles	MS4	Kim Young-gun; South Korea	Wanchai Chaiwut; Thailand	Isau Ogunkunle; Nigeria
Singles	MS5	Tommy Urhaug; Norway	Cheng Ming-chih; Chinese Taipei	Ali Öztürk; Turkey
Singles	MS5	Tommy Urhaug; Norway	Cheng Ming-chih; Chinese Taipei	Mitar Palikuca; Serbia
Singles	MS6	Matteo Parenzan; Italy	Rungroj Thainiyom; Thailand	Peter Rosenmeier; Denmark
Singles	MS6	Matteo Parenzan; Italy	Rungroj Thainiyom; Thailand	Ian Seidenfeld; United States
Singles	MS7	Yan Shuo; China	Will Bayley; Great Britain	Jean Paul Montanus; Netherlands
Singles	MS7	Yan Shuo; China	Will Bayley; Great Britain	Chalermpong Punpoo; Thailand
Singles	MS8	Viktor Didukh; Ukraine	Zhao Shuai; China	Maksym Nikolenko; Ukraine
Singles	MS8	Viktor Didukh; Ukraine	Zhao Shuai; China	Phisit Wangphonphathanasiri; Thailand
Singles	MS9	Laurens Devos; Belgium	Lucas Didier; France	Ander Cepas; Spain
Singles	MS9	Laurens Devos; Belgium	Lucas Didier; France	Ma Lin; Australia
Singles	MS10	Patryk Chojnowski; Poland	Lian Hao; China	Filip Radović; Montenegro
Singles	MS10	Patryk Chojnowski; Poland	Lian Hao; China	Mateo Boheas; France
Singles	MS11	Kim Gi-tae; South Korea	Chen Po-yen; Chinese Taipei	Samuel von Einem; Australia
Singles	MS11	Kim Gi-tae; South Korea	Chen Po-yen; Chinese Taipei	Peter Palos; Hungary
Doubles	MD4	Slovakia; Peter Lovas; Ján Riapoš	South Korea; Jang Yeong-jin; Park Sung-joo	France; Fabien Lamirault; Julien Michaud
Doubles	MD4	Slovakia; Peter Lovas; Ján Riapoš	South Korea; Jang Yeong-jin; Park Sung-joo	South Korea; Cha Soo-yong; Park Jin-cheol
Doubles	MD8	China; Cao Ningning; Feng Panfeng	Germany; Valentin Baus; Thomas Schmidberger	Thailand; Wanchai Chaiwut; Yuttajak Glinbancheun
Doubles	MD8	China; Cao Ningning; Feng Panfeng	Germany; Valentin Baus; Thomas Schmidberger	Turkey; Abdullah Öztürk; Nesim Turan
Doubles	MD14	China; Liao Keli; Yan Shuo	Thailand; Phisit Wangphonphathanasiri; Rungroj Thainiyom	Great Britain; Paul Karabardak; Billy Shilton
Doubles	MD14	China; Liao Keli; Yan Shuo	Thailand; Phisit Wangphonphathanasiri; Rungroj Thainiyom	France; Esteban Herrault; Clément Berthier
Doubles	MD18	Poland; Piotr Grudzień; Patryk Chojnowski	China; Zhao Yiqing; Liu Chaodong	China; Lian Hao; Zhao Shuai
Doubles	MD18	Poland; Piotr Grudzień; Patryk Chojnowski	China; Zhao Yiqing; Liu Chaodong	Brazil; Claudio Massad; Luiz Manara

=== Women's events ===
Event	Class	Gold	Silver	Bronze
Singles	WS1–2	Giada Rossi; Italy	Liu Jing; China	Dorota Bucław; Poland
Singles	WS1–2	Giada Rossi; Italy	Liu Jing; China	Seo Su-yeon; South Korea
Singles	WS3	Anđela Mužinić; Croatia	Yoon Ji-yu; South Korea	Carlotta Ragazzini; Italy
Singles	WS3	Anđela Mužinić; Croatia	Yoon Ji-yu; South Korea	Xue Juan; China
Singles	WS4	Sandra Mikolaschek; Germany	Borislava Perić; Serbia	Zhou Ying; China
Singles	WS4	Sandra Mikolaschek; Germany	Borislava Perić; Serbia	Gu Xiaodan; China
Singles	WS5	Zhang Bian; China	Pan Jiamin; China	Moon Sung-hye; South Korea
Singles	WS5	Zhang Bian; China	Pan Jiamin; China	Jung Young-a; South Korea
Singles	WS6	Najlah Al-Dayyeni; Iraq	Maryna Lytovchenko; Ukraine	Camelia Ciripan; Romania
Singles	WS6	Najlah Al-Dayyeni; Iraq	Maryna Lytovchenko; Ukraine	Maliak Alieva; Neutral Paralympic Athletes
Singles	WS7	Kelly van Zon; Netherlands	Kubra Korkut; Turkey	Bly Twomey; Great Britain
Singles	WS7	Kelly van Zon; Netherlands	Kubra Korkut; Turkey	Wang Rui; China
Singles	WS8	Huang Wenjuan; China	Aida Dahlen; Norway	Juliane Wolf; Germany
Singles	WS8	Huang Wenjuan; China	Aida Dahlen; Norway	Florencia Pérez; Chile
Singles	WS9	Karolina Pęk; Poland	Xiong Guiyan; China	Lei Lina; Australia
Singles	WS9	Karolina Pęk; Poland	Xiong Guiyan; China	Alexa Szvitacs; Hungary
Singles	WS10	Yang Qian; Australia	Natalia Partyka; Poland	Bruna Alexandre; Brazil
Singles	WS10	Yang Qian; Australia	Natalia Partyka; Poland	Tien Shiau-wen; Chinese Taipei
Singles	WS11	Natsuki Wada; Japan	Elena Prokofeva; Neutral Paralympic Athletes	Ebru Acer; Turkey
Singles	WS11	Natsuki Wada; Japan	Elena Prokofeva; Neutral Paralympic Athletes	Kanami Furukawa; Japan
Doubles	WD5	China; Liu Jing; Xue Juan	South Korea; Seo Su-yeon; Yoon Ji-yu	Brazil; Cátia Oliveira; Joyce de Oliveira
Doubles	WD5	China; Liu Jing; Xue Juan	South Korea; Seo Su-yeon; Yoon Ji-yu	Thailand; Dararat Asayut; Chilchitparyak Bootwansirina
Doubles	WD10	China; Gu Xiaodan; Pan Jiamin	Serbia; Nada Matić; Borislava Perić	South Korea; Kang Oe-jeong; Lee Mi-gyu
Doubles	WD10	China; Gu Xiaodan; Pan Jiamin	Serbia; Nada Matić; Borislava Perić	South Korea; Jung Young-a; Moon Sung-hye
Doubles	WD14	China; Huang Wenjuan; Jin Yucheng	Germany; Stephanie Grebe; Juliane Wolf	Norway; Aida Dahlen; Merethe Tveiten
Doubles	WD14	China; Huang Wenjuan; Jin Yucheng	Germany; Stephanie Grebe; Juliane Wolf	Great Britain; Felicity Pickard; Bly Twomey
Doubles	WD20	Australia; Lei Lina; Yang Qian	Chinese Taipei; Lin Tzu-yu; Tien Shiau-wen	Poland; Natalia Partyka; Karolina Pęk
Doubles	WD20	Australia; Lei Lina; Yang Qian	Chinese Taipei; Lin Tzu-yu; Tien Shiau-wen	Brazil; Bruna Alexandre; Danielle Rauen

=== Mixed events ===
Event	Class	Gold	Silver	Bronze
Doubles	XD7	China; Zhou Ying; Feng Panfeng	Thailand; Yuttajak Glinbancheun; Wijittra Jaion	China; Zhai Xiang; Gu Xiaodan
Doubles	XD7	China; Zhou Ying; Feng Panfeng	Thailand; Yuttajak Glinbancheun; Wijittra Jaion	France; Flora Vautier; Florian Merrien
Doubles	XD17	China; Mao Jingdian; Zhao Shuai	China; Peng Weinan; Xiong Guiyan	Poland; Karolina Pęk; Piotr Grudzień
Doubles	XD17	China; Mao Jingdian; Zhao Shuai	China; Peng Weinan; Xiong Guiyan	Ukraine; Viktor Didukh; Iryna Shynkarova

== Taekwondo ==
=== Men's events ===
Event	Gold	Silver	Bronze
58 kg	Asaf Yasur; Israel	Ali Can Özcan; Turkey	Sabir Zeynalov; Azerbaijan
58 kg	Asaf Yasur; Israel	Ali Can Özcan; Turkey	Xiao Xiang-wen; Chinese Taipei
63 kg	Mahmut Bozteke; Turkey	Ganbatyn Bolor-Erdene; Mongolia	Antonino Bossolo; Italy
63 kg	Mahmut Bozteke; Turkey	Ganbatyn Bolor-Erdene; Mongolia	Ayoub Adouich; Morocco
70 kg	Imamaddin Khalilov; Azerbaijan	Fatih Çelik; Turkey	Juan Diego García López; Mexico
70 kg	Imamaddin Khalilov; Azerbaijan	Fatih Çelik; Turkey	Juan Samorano; Argentina
80 kg	Asadbek Toshtemirov; Uzbekistan	Luis Mario Nájera; Mexico	Alireza Bakht; Iran
80 kg	Asadbek Toshtemirov; Uzbekistan	Luis Mario Nájera; Mexico	Joo Jeong-hun; South Korea
+80 kg	Matt Bush; Great Britain	Aliaskhab Ramazanov; Neutral Paralympic Athletes	Evan Medell; United States
+80 kg	Matt Bush; Great Britain	Aliaskhab Ramazanov; Neutral Paralympic Athletes	Hamed Haghshenas; Iran

=== Women's events ===
Event	Gold	Silver	Bronze
47 kg	Leonor Espinoza; Peru	Ziyodakhon Isakova; Uzbekistan	Khwansuda Phuangkitcha; Thailand
47 kg	Leonor Espinoza; Peru	Ziyodakhon Isakova; Uzbekistan	Zakia Khudadadi; Refugee Paralympic Team
52 kg	Surenjav Ulambayar; Mongolia	Zahra Rahimi; Iran	Ana Japaridze; Georgia
52 kg	Surenjav Ulambayar; Mongolia	Zahra Rahimi; Iran	Meryem Betül Çavdar; Turkey
57 kg	Li Yujie; China	Gamze Gürdal; Turkey	Palesha Goverdhan; Nepal
57 kg	Li Yujie; China	Gamze Gürdal; Turkey	Silvana Fernandes; Brazil
65 kg	Ana Carolina Moura; Brazil	Djélika Diallo; France	Lisa Gjessing; Denmark
65 kg	Ana Carolina Moura; Brazil	Djélika Diallo; France	Christina Gkentzou; Greece
+65 kg	Amy Truesdale; Great Britain	Guljonoy Naimova; Uzbekistan	Eleni Papastamatopoulou; Greece
+65 kg	Amy Truesdale; Great Britain	Guljonoy Naimova; Uzbekistan	Rajae Akermach; Morocco

== Wheelchair basketball ==
Event	Gold	Silver	Bronze
Men	United States; Jacob Williams; Talen Jourdan; Brian Bell; Steve Serio; Paul Schulte; Nate Hinze; Trevon Jenifer; AJ Fitzpatrick; Jorge Salazar; Fabian Romo; John Boie; Jeromie Meyer	Great Britain; Lee Fryer; Simon Brown; Kyle Marsh; Terry Bywater; Harrison Brown; Abdi Jama; Gregg Warburton; Lee Manning; Jim Palmer; Peter Cusack; Ben Fox; Phil Pratt	Germany; Nico Dreimuller; Matthias Guntner; Tobias Hell; Lukas Glossner; Jan Haller; Jan Sadler; Jens-Eike Albrecht; Thomas Boehme; Aliaksandr Halouski; Alexander Budde; Thomas Reier; Julian Lammering
Women	Netherlands; Ilse Arts; Sylvana van Hees; Lindsay Frelink; Jitske Visser; Julia van der Sprong; Bo Kramer; Xena Wimmenhoeve; Cher Korver; Saskia Pronk; Carina de Rooij; Mariska Beijer; Ylonne Post	United States; Alejandra Ibáñez; Abigail Bauleke; Josie Aslakson; Natalie Schneider; Rebecca Murray; Rose Hollermann; Kaitlyn Eaton; Lindsey Zurbrugg; Emily Oberst; Bailey Moody; Ixhelt Gonzalez; Courtney Ryan	China; Chen Xuejing; Zhang Xuemei; Zhang Tonglei; Lyu Guidi; Lin Suiling; Huang Xiaolian; Chen Jingwen; Qiu Qiaoling; Zhang Meimei; Long Yun; Dai Jiameng; He Xiang

== Wheelchair fencing ==
=== Men's events ===
Event	Class	Gold	Silver	Bronze
Individual épée	A	Sun Gang; China	Piers Gilliver; Great Britain	Hakan Akkaya; Turkey
Individual épée	B	Dimitri Coutya; Great Britain	Visit Kingmanaw; Thailand	Michał Dąbrowski; Poland
Team épée	A–B	China; Sun Gang; Tian Jianquan; Zhang Jie; Zhong Saichun	Iraq; Ammar Ali; Zainulabdeen Al-Madhkhoori; Hayder Al-Ogaili	Great Britain; Dimitri Coutya; Oliver Lam Watson; Piers Gilliver
Individual foil	A	Sun Gang; China	Matteo Betti; Italy	Zhong Saichun; China
Individual foil	B	Dimitri Coutya; Great Britain	Feng Yanke; China	Hu Daoliang; China
Team foil	A–B	China; Sun Gang; Zhong Saichun; Feng Yanke; Tian Jianquan	Great Britain; Dimitri Coutya; Oliver Lam Watson; Piers Gilliver	France; Damien Tokatlian; Ludovic Lemoine; Maxime Valet; Yohan Peter
Individual sabre	A	Maurice Schmidt; Germany	Piers Gilliver; Great Britain	Edoardo Giordan; Italy
Individual sabre	B	Feng Yanke; China	Michał Dąbrowski; Poland	Zhang Jie; China

=== Women's events ===
Event	Class	Gold	Silver	Bronze
Individual épée	A	Chen Yuandong; China	Kwon Hyo-kyeong; South Korea	Gu Haiyan; China
Individual épée	B	Saysunee Jana; Thailand	Kang Su; China	Olena Fedota-Isaieva; Ukraine
Team épée	A–B	China; Zou Xufeng; Gu Haiyan; Kang Su; Chen Yuandong	Ukraine; Yevheniia Breus; Olena Fedota-Isaieva; Nataliia Morkvych; Nadiia Doloh	Thailand; Saysunee Jana; Duean Nakprasit; Aphinya Thongdaeng
Individual foil	A	Zou Xufeng; China	Gu Haiyan; China	Judith Rodríguez Menéndez; Spain
Individual foil	B	Saysunee Jana; Thailand	Xiao Rong; China	Beatrice Vio; Italy
Team foil	A–B	China; Zou Xufeng; Gu Haiyan; Xiao Rong; Chen Yuandong	Hungary; Eva Hajmasi; Boglarka Mezo; Zsuzsanna Krajnyak; Amarilla Veres	Italy; Andreea Mogoș; Rossana Pasquino; Loredana Trigilia; Beatrice Vio
Individual sabre	A	Gu Haiyan; China	Kinga Dróżdż; Poland	Nino Tibilashvili; Georgia
Individual sabre	B	Saysunee Jana; Thailand	Xiao Rong; China	Olena Fedota-Isaieva; Ukraine

== Wheelchair rugby ==
Event	Gold	Silver	Bronze
Mixed open	Japan; Daisuke Ikezaki; Ryuji Kusaba; Yukinobu Ike; Hitoshi Ogawa; Hidefumi Wakayama; Yuki Hasegawa; Kae Kurahashi; Masayuki Haga; Shinichi Shimakawa; Shunya Nakamachi; Seiya Norimatsu; Katsuya Hashimoto	United States; Sarah Adam; Chuck Aoki; Clayton Brackett; Jeff Butler; Lee Fredette; Brad Hudspeth; Chuck Melton; Eric Newby; Josh O'Neill; Zion Redington; Mason Symons; Josh Wheeler	Australia; Ella Sabljak; Emilie Miller; Ryley Batt; Jake Howe; James McQuillan; Ben Fawcett; Chris Bond; Beau Vernon; Shae Graham; Andrew Edmondson; Brayden Foxley-Connolly; Josh Nicholson

== Wheelchair tennis ==
Event	Gold	Silver	Bronze
Men's singles	Tokito Oda; Japan	Alfie Hewett; Great Britain	Gustavo Fernández; Argentina
Men's doubles	Great Britain; Alfie Hewett; Gordon Reid	Japan; Takuya Miki; Tokito Oda	Spain; Daniel Caverzaschi; Martin de la Puente
Women's singles	Yui Kamiji; Japan	Diede de Groot; Netherlands	Aniek van Koot; Netherlands
Women's doubles	Japan; Yui Kamiji; Manami Tanaka	Netherlands; Diede de Groot; Aniek van Koot	China; Guo Luoyao; Wang Ziying
Quad singles	Niels Vink; Netherlands	Sam Schroder; Netherlands	Guy Sasson; Israel
Quad doubles	Netherlands; Sam Schroder; Niels Vink	Great Britain; Andy Lapthorne; Gregory Slade	South Africa; Donald Ramphadi; Lucas Sithole

== See also ==
- 2024 Summer Paralympics medal table
