= Georgia at the 2024 Summer Paralympics =

- IPC code: GEO
- NPC: Georgian Paralympic Committee

in Paris, France August 28, 2024 – September 8, 2024
- Competitors: 14 in 6 sports
- Flag bearer: Akaki Jintcharadze
- Medals Ranked 51st: Gold 1 Silver 4 Bronze 4 Total 9

Summer Paralympics appearances (overview)
- 2008; 2012; 2016; 2020; 2024

Other related appearances
- Soviet Union (1988)

Georgia competed at the 2024 Summer Paralympics in Paris, France, from 28 August to 8 September.

== Medalists ==
The following Georgian competitors won medals at the games. In the discipline sections below, the medalists' names are bolded.

Medal	Name	Sport	Event	Date
Gold	Giga Ochkhikidze	Athletics	Men's shot put	1 September
Silver	Vladimer Tchintcharauli	Shooting	R9 Mixed 50 metre rifle prone SH2	4 September
Silver	Zurab Zurabiani	Judo	Men's 60 kg J2	5 September
Silver	Giorgi Kaldani	Judo	Men's 73 kg J2	6 September
Silver	Revaz Chikoidze	Judo	Men's +90 kg J2	7 September
Bronze	Ana Japaridze	Taekwondo	Women's –52 kg	29 August
Bronze	Nino Tibilashvili	Wheelchair fencing	Women's sabre A	3 September
Bronze	Ina Kaldani	Judo	Women's 70 kg J2	6 September
Bronze	Akaki Jintcharadze	Powerlifting	Men's +107 kg	8 September

== Competitors ==
The following is the list of number of competitors in the Games.

Sport	Men	Women	Total
Athletics	2	0	2
Judo	4	1	5
Powerlifting	1	0	1
Shooting	1	0	1
Taekwondo	1	2	3
Wheelchair fencing	0	2	2
Total	9	5	14

== Athletics ==
Georgian track and field athletes achieved quota places for the following events based on their results at the 2023 World Championships, 2024 World Championships, or through high performance allocation, as long as they meet the minimum entry standard (MES).

Key

- Note–Ranks given for track events are within the athlete's heat only
- **Q** = Qualified for the next round
- **q** = Qualified for the next round as a fastest loser or, in field events, by position without achieving the qualifying target
- **DQ** = Disqualified
- **PR** = Paralympic Record
- **AR** = Area (or continental) Record
- **NR** = National Record
- **SB** = Season's Best
- N/A = Round not applicable for the event
- Bye = Athlete not required to compete in round

Athlete	Event	Final	
Athlete	Event	Distance	Position
Davit Kavtaradze	Men's javelin throw F38	35.71	8
**Giga Ochkhikidze**	Men's shot put F53	9.66 WR	1st place, gold medalist(s)

== Judo ==
Athlete	Event	Round of 16	Quarterfinals	Semifinals	Repechage	Final / BM	
Athlete	Event	Opposition Result	Opposition Result	Opposition Result	Opposition Result	Opposition Result	Rank
**Zurab Zurabiani**	Men's 60 kg J2	Bye	Herrera (CHI); **W** 01–00	Ouldkouider (ALG); **W** 10–00	—	Namozov (UZB); **L** 00–01	2nd place, silver medalist(s)
**Giorgi Kaldani**	Men's 73 kg J2	Bye	Vargoczki (ROU); **W** 10–00	Kuranbaev (UZB); **W** 10–00	—	Seto (JPN); **L** 00–10	2nd place, silver medalist(s)
Lasha Kizilashvili	Men's 90 kg J2	Smagululy (KAZ); **W** 10–00	Latchoumanaya (FRA); **L** 00–01	Did not advance	Molloy (GBR); **W** 11–00	Karomatov (UZB); **L** 00–10	5
**Revaz Chikoidze**	Men's + 90 kg J2	—	Mantolas (INA); **W** 10–00	Shukurbekov (KAZ); **W** 10–00	—	Bolukbasi (TUR); **L** 00–01	2nd place, silver medalist(s)
**Ina Kaldani**	Women's 70 kg J2	—	Victório (BRA); **W** 10–01	Wang (CHN); **L** 00–10	—	Mereke (KAZ); **W** 01–00	3rd place, bronze medalist(s)

== Powerlifting ==
Athlete	Event	Attempts (kg)			Result (kg)	Rank
Athlete	Event	1	2	3	Result (kg)	Rank
**Akaki Jintcharadze**	Men's + 107 kg	238	244	250	**250**	3rd place, bronze medalist(s)

== Shooting ==
Mixed

Athlete	Event	Qualification		Final	
Athlete	Event	Points	Rank	Points	Rank
**Vladimer Tchintcharauli**	R4 Mixed 10 metre air rifle standing SH2	630.00	15	Did not advance	
**Vladimer Tchintcharauli**	R5 Mixed 10 metre air rifle prone SH2	632.40	22	Did not advance	
**Vladimer Tchintcharauli**	R9 Mixed 50 metre rifle prone SH2	622,40	**6Q**	248,20	2nd place, silver medalist(s)

== Taekwondo ==
Georgia qualified two athletes to compete at the Paralympics competition. Giorgi Nikoladze and Ana Japaridze qualified for the games, following their victory of championing their own division, at the 2024 European Qualification Tournament in Sofia, Bulgaria.

Athlete	Event	First round	Quarterfinals	Semifinals	Repechage 1	Repechage 2	Final / BM	
Athlete	Event	Opposition Result	Opposition Result	Opposition Result	Opposition Result	Opposition Result	Opposition Result	Rank
Giorgi Nikoladze	Men's –70 kg	Mahmoud (EGY); **W** 18–16	Çelik (TUR); **L** 19–24	Did not advance	—	Samorano (ARG); **L** 3–15	Did not advance	7
Lia Chachibaia	Women's –47 kg	Laarif (MAR); **L** 11–12	Did not advance					9
**Ana Japaridze**	Women's –52 kg	Aguila (USA); **W** 22–2	Çavdar (TUR); **W** 7–6	Rahimi (IRI); **L** 0–6	—		Hassan (EGY); **W** 2–2	3rd place, bronze medalist(s)

== Wheelchair fencing ==
Women

Athlete	Event	Round of 32	Round of 16	Quarterfinal	Semifinal	Repechage R1	Repechage R2	Repechage R3	Repechage R4	Final / BM	
Athlete	Event	Opposition Score	Opposition Score	Opposition Score	Opposition Score	Opposition Score	Opposition Score	Opposition Score	Opposition Score	Opposition Score	Rank
**Nino Tibilashvili**	Women's foil A	Bye	Kwon (KOR); **L** 4–15	Did not advance		Vide (FRA); **L** 5–15	Did not advance				
**Nino Tibilashvili**	Women's sabre A	Bye	Kwon (KOR); **W** 15–5	Yee (HKG); **W** 15–4	Gu (CHN); **L** 6–15	Bye			Morkvych (UKR); **W** 15–14	Vide (FRA); **W** 15–11	3rd place, bronze medalist(s)
Irma Khetsuriani	Women's foil B	—	Santos (BRA); **W** 15–13	Sakurai (JPN); **L** 12–15	Did not advance	Geddes (USA); **W** 15–6	Kang (CHN); **L** 7–15	Did not advance			
Irma Khetsuriani	Women's sabre B	—	Jaimez (VEN); **W** 15–2	Pacek (POL); **W** 15–9	Rong (CHN); **L** 5–15	Bye			Ao (CHN); **L** 8–15	Did not advance	5

== See also ==
- Georgia at the 2024 Summer Olympics
- Georgia at the Paralympics
