= Georgia at the 2020 Summer Paralympics =

- IPC code: GEO
- NPC: Georgian Paralympic Committee

in Tokyo
- Competitors: 13 in 6 sports
- Medals: Gold 0 Silver 3 Bronze 0 Total 3

Summer Paralympics appearances (overview)
- 2008; 2012; 2016; 2020; 2024

Other related appearances
- Soviet Union (1988)

Georgia competed at the 2020 Summer Paralympics in Tokyo, Japan, from 24 August to 5 September 2021.

== Medalists ==
| Medal | Name | Sport | Event | Date |
|---|---|---|---|---|
| Silver | Nino Tibilashvili | Wheelchair fencing | Women's sabre A | 25 August |
| Silver | Ina Kaldani | Judo | Women's 70 kg | 29 August |
| Silver | Revaz Chikoidze | Judo | Men's +100 kg | 29 August |

== Competitors ==
| Sport | Men | Women | Total |
|---|---|---|---|
| Athletics | 1 | 0 | 1 |
| Judo | 4 | 1 | 5 |
| Powerlifting | 2 | 0 | 2 |
| Shooting | 1 | 0 | 1 |
| Swimming | 1 | 0 | 1 |
| Wheelchair Fencing | 0 | 3 | 3 |
| Total | 9 | 4 | 13 |

== Athletics ==
Field

| Athlete | Event | Heats | | Final | |
| Athlete | Event | Result | Rank | Result | Rank |
|---|---|---|---|---|---|
| Davit Kavtaradze | Men's long jump T38 | 5.76 | 12 | did not advance | |

== Judo ==
| Athlete | Event | Preliminaries | Quarterfinals | Semifinals | Repechage First round | Repechage Final | Final / BM | |
| Athlete | Event | Opposition Result | Opposition Result | Opposition Result | Opposition Result | Opposition Result | Opposition Result | Rank |
|---|---|---|---|---|---|---|---|---|
| Zurab Zurabiani | Men's 60 kg | Sukhbaatar (MGL); L 00–10 | did not advance | | | | | |
| Giorgi Gamjashvili | Men's 66 kg | Bye | Rudenko (RPC); W 11–00 | Ibáñez (ESP); L 00–10 | — | | Seto (JPN); L 01–10 | 5 |
| Giorgi Kaldani | Men's 73 kg | Iafa (POR); W 11–00 | Mahomedov (UKR); W 10–00 | Daulet (KAZ); L 00–11 | — | | Bareikis (LTU); L 00–01 | 5 |
| Revaz Chikoidze | Men's +100 kg | Bye | Masaki (JPN); W 10–00 | Sharipov (UZB); W 10–00 | — | | Kheirollahzadeh (IRI); L 00–10 | 2nd place, silver medalist(s) |
| Ina Kaldani | Women's 70 kg | Bye | Ruvalcaba (MEX); W 10–00 | Ogawa (JPN); W 10–00 | — | | Maldonado (BRA); L 00–01 | 2nd place, silver medalist(s) |

== Powerlifting ==
| Athlete | Event | Result | Rank |
|---|---|---|---|
| Ahmad Razm Azar | Men's 80 kg | 198 | 5 |
| Akaki Jintcharadze | Men's 107 kg | 221 | 4 |

== Shooting ==
| Athlete | Event | Qualification | | Final | |
| Athlete | Event | Score | Rank | Score | Rank |
|---|---|---|---|---|---|
| Vladimer Tchintcharauli | Mixed 10 m air rifle standing SH2 | 625.6 | 18 | did not advance | |
| Vladimer Tchintcharauli | Mixed 10 m air rifle prone SH2 | DSQ | | | |
| Vladimer Tchintcharauli | Mixed 50 m rifle prone SH2 | 616.7 | 20 | did not advance | |

== Swimming ==
| Athlete | Event | Heats | | Final | |
| Athlete | Event | Result | Rank | Result | Rank |
|---|---|---|---|---|---|
| Nika Tvauri | Men's 100 m breaststroke SB11 | 1:38.73 | 12 | did not advance | |

== Wheelchair fencing ==
| Athlete | Event | Group stage | | | | | | | Round of 16 | Quarterfinals | Semifinals | Final/BM | |
| Athlete | Event | Opposition Result | Opposition Result | Opposition Result | Opposition Result | Opposition Result | Opposition Result | Rank | Opposition Result | Opposition Result | Opposition Result | Opposition Result | Rank |
|---|---|---|---|---|---|---|---|---|---|---|---|---|---|
| Nino Tibilashvili | Women's foil A | Justine (HKG); W 5-4 | Gu (CHN); L 0-5 | Evdokimova (RPC); L 4-5 | Hajmasi (HUN); L 1-5 | — | — | 12Q | Rong (CHN); L 8-15 | did not advance | | | |
| Nino Tibilashvili | Women's sabre A | Sycheva (RPC); W 5-0 | Morel (CAN); W 5-2 | Drozdz (POL); L 1-5 | Gu (CHN); L 4-5 | — | — | 7Q | Trigilia (ITA); W 15-9 | Morkvych (UKR); W 15-13 | Breus (UKR); W 15-12 | Bian (CHN); L 7-15 | 2nd place, silver medalist(s) |
| Gvantsa Zadishvili | Women's foil A | Mandryk (UKR); L 4-5 | Matsumoto (JPN); W 5-1 | Yu (HKG); L 2-5 | Krajnyak (HUN); L 3-5 | Mogos (ITA); L 2-5 | — | 14 | did not advance | | | | |
| Irma Khetsuriani | Women's foil B | Vio (ITA); L 0-5 | Santos (BRA); L 3-5 | Chung (HKG); W 5-0 | Xiao (CHN); L 2-5 | Vasileva (RPC); L 3-5 | Abe (JPN); W 5-0 | 8Q | Santos (BRA); W 15-7 | Vio (ITA); L 6-15 | did not advance | | |
| Irma Khetsuriani | Women's sabre B | Jana (THA); L 4-5 | Xiao (CHN); L 4-5 | Hayes (USA); W 5-1 | Tauber (GER); W 5-2 | Pasquino (ITA); W 5-4 | — | 6Q | Bye | Pasquino (ITA); W 15-14 | Tan (CHN); L 8-15 | Xiao (CHN); L 6-15 | 4 |
| Irma Khetsuriani; Nino Tibilashvili; Gvantsa Zadishvili | Women's foil team | Hungary; L 30-45 | RPC; L 36-45 | China; L 21-45 | — | — | — | 7 | did not advance | | | | |

== See also ==
- Georgia at the Paralympics
- Georgia at the 2020 Summer Olympics
