= Georgia at the 2016 Summer Paralympics =

- Flag of Georgia
- IPC code: GEO
- NPC: Georgian Paralympic Committee

in Rio de Janeiro
- Competitors: 5 in 5 sports
- Medals Ranked 60th: Gold 1 Silver 0 Bronze 0 Total 1

Summer Paralympics appearances (overview)
- 2008; 2012; 2016; 2020; 2024

Other related appearances
- Soviet Union (1988)

Georgia competed at the 2016 Summer Paralympics in Rio de Janeiro, Brazil, from 7 September to 18 September 2016.

== Disability classifications ==
Every participant at the Paralympics has their disability grouped into one of five disability categories; amputation, the condition may be congenital or sustained through injury or illness; cerebral palsy; wheelchair athletes, there is often overlap between this and other categories; visual impairment, including blindness; Les autres, any physical disability that does not fall strictly under one of the other categories, for example dwarfism or multiple sclerosis. Each Paralympic sport then has its own classifications, dependent upon the specific physical demands of competition. Events are given a code, made of numbers and letters, describing the type of event and classification of the athletes competing. Some sports, such as athletics, divide athletes by both the category and severity of their disabilities, other sports, for example swimming, group competitors from different categories together, the only separation being based on the severity of the disability.

== Medallists ==
Medal	Name	Sport	Event	Date
Gold	Zviad Gogotchuri	Judo	Men's −90 kg	10 September

== Archery ==
Individual

Athlete	Event	Ranking round		Round of 32	Round of 16	Quarterfinals	Semifinals	Final / BM	
Athlete	Event	Score	Seed	Opposition Score	Opposition Score	Opposition Score	Opposition Score	Opposition Score	Rank
Vano Tsiklauri	Men's individual Recurve open	435	33	did not advance					

== Judo ==
Athlete	Event	Preliminaries	Quarterfinals	Semifinals	Repechage First round	Repechage Final	Final / BM	
Athlete	Event	Opposition Result	Opposition Result	Opposition Result	Opposition Result	Opposition Result	Opposition Result	Rank
Zviad Gogotchuri	Men's −90 kg	Bye	Lencina (ARG); W 100–000	Crockett (USA); W 101–000	—N/a		Nazarenko (UKR); W 100–000	1st place, gold medalist(s)

== Powerlifting ==
Athlete	Event	Result	Rank
Akaki Jintcharadze	Men's −97 kg	155	9

== Swimming ==
Women

Athlete	Events	Heats		Final	
Athlete	Events	Time	Rank	Time	Rank
Lia Chachibaia	100 m breaststroke SB8	2:02.60	9	did not advance	

== Wheelchair fencing ==
Women

Athlete	Event	Group stage			Quarterfinals	Semifinals	Final/BM	
Athlete	Event	Opposition	Result	Rank	Opposition Result	Opposition Result	Opposition Result	Rank
Irma Khetsuriani	Individual Foil B	Makrytskaya (BLR)	L 2-5	4 Q	Chan (HKG); L 5-15	Did not advance		
Irma Khetsuriani	Individual Foil B	Yao (CHN)	L 3-5	4 Q	Chan (HKG); L 5-15	Did not advance		
Irma Khetsuriani	Individual Foil B	Vio (ITA)	L 0-5	4 Q	Chan (HKG); L 5-15	Did not advance		
Irma Khetsuriani	Individual Foil B	Chung (HKG)	W 5-4	4 Q	Chan (HKG); L 5-15	Did not advance		
Irma Khetsuriani	Individual Foil B	Briese-Baetke (GER)	W 5-2	4 Q	Chan (HKG); L 5-15	Did not advance		

== See also ==
- Georgia at the 2016 Summer Olympics
