= Georgia at the 2026 Winter Paralympics =

- Flag of Georgia
- IPC code: GEO
- NPC: Georgian Paralympic Committee

in Milan & Cortina d'Ampezzo, Italy 6 March 2026 – 15 March 2026
- Competitors: 2 (2 men) in 2 sports
- Medals: Gold 0 Silver 0 Bronze 0 Total 0

Winter Paralympics appearances (overview)
- 2018; 2022; 2026

Other related appearances
- Soviet Union (1988)

Georgia will compete at the 2026 Winter Paralympics in Milan & Cortina d'Ampezzo, Italy, which will take place between 6–15 March 2026.

== Competitors ==
The following is the list of number of competitors participating at the Games per sport/discipline.

Sport	Men	Women	Total
Para cross-country skiing	1	0	1
Para snowboard	1	0	1
Total	2	0	2

== Para cross-country skiing ==
Athlete	Class	Event	Qualification		Semifinal		Final	
Athlete	Class	Event	Time	Rank	Time	Rank	Time	Rank
Temuri Dadiani	LW12	Men's sprint, sitting	2:40.68	33	Did not advance			
Temuri Dadiani	LW12	Men's 10 km, sitting	—N/a				33:05.7	29

== Para snowboard ==
Banked slalom

Athlete	Event	Run 1	Run 2	Best	Rank
Valerian Lomaia	Men's banked slalom, SB-LL2	1:10.58	1:08.50	1:08.50	19

== See also ==
- Georgia at the Paralympics
- Georgia at the 2026 Winter Olympics
