= Georgia at the 2012 Summer Paralympics =

- Flag of Georgia
- IPC code: GEO
- NPC: Georgian Paralympic Committee

in London
- Competitors: 2 in 2 sports
- Medals: Gold 0 Silver 0 Bronze 0 Total 0

Summer Paralympics appearances (overview)
- 2008; 2012; 2016; 2020; 2024

Other related appearances
- Soviet Union (1988)

Georgia competed at the 2012 Summer Paralympics in London, United Kingdom from August 29 to September 9, 2012.

== Powerlifting ==
Men

Athlete	Event	Result	Rank
Shota Omarashvili	-60kg	NMR	

== Swimming ==
Men

Athletes	Event	Heat		Final	
Athletes	Event	Time	Rank	Time	Rank
Nika Tvauri	100m breaststroke SB11	1:28.37	13	did not advance	

== See also ==
- Georgia at the 2012 Summer Olympics
