= Georgia at the 2018 Winter Paralympics =

- Flag of Georgia
- IPC code: GEO
- NPC: Georgian Paralympic Committee

in Pyeongchang
- Competitors: 2 in 1 sport
- Flag bearer: Temuri Dadiani
- Medals: Gold 0 Silver 0 Bronze 0 Total 0

Winter Paralympics appearances (overview)
- 2018; 2022; 2026

Other related appearances
- Soviet Union (1988)

Georgia sent competitors to the 2018 Winter Paralympics in Pyeongchang, South Korea. The team has two people who are competing in para-Nordic skiing. One is a man and one is a woman.

== Team ==
Georgia leaves to go to Pyeongchang on March 6. Georgia, North Korea and Tajikistan are the three countries making their first appearance Winter Paralympics.

The table below contains the list of members of people (called "Team Georgia") that will be participating in the 2018 Games.

Team Georgia
Name	Sport	Gender	Classification	Time	Events	ref
Temuri Dadiani	para-Nordic skiing	male	30	3:56.50	Men's 1.5 km sprint classical - Sitting	
Temuri Dadiani	para-Nordic skiing	male	31	30:44.5	7.5 km sitting	
Temuri Dadiani	para-Nordic skiing	male	DNF	DNF	15 km sitting	
Nino Sabashvili	para-Nordic skiing	female	25	8:24.69	Women's 1.5 km sprint classical - sitting	

== Para-Nordic skiing ==
=== Skiers ===
Temuri Dadiani competes in three sports: cycling, wheelchair fencing and para-Nordic skiing. He competed in cycling at the 2017 Invictus Games. He has a Guinness World Record. It is for doing 44 push-ups in one minute. Dadiani was in the military. While an officer in Afghanistan in August 2011, he was hit by a landmine. Doctors amputated both his legs.

Nino Sabashvili had a goal of winning a Paralympic medal. Her first sport is para-armwrestling. The sport is not on the program for the Summer or Winter Paralympic Games. She started para-Nordic skiing so she could compete in a sport that is on the program. She is very good at para-armwrestling. At the 2016 World Para Armwrestling Championships in Blagoevgrad, Bulgaria, she won two silver medals.
