= Georgia at the 2022 Winter Paralympics =

- Flag of Georgia
- IPC code: GEO
- NPC: Georgian Paralympic Committee

in Beijing, China 4 March 2022 – 13 March 2022
- Competitors: 1 (1 man) in 1 sport
- Flag bearer: Temuri Dadiani
- Medals: Gold 0 Silver 0 Bronze 0 Total 0

Winter Paralympics appearances (overview)
- 2018; 2022; 2026

Other related appearances
- Soviet Union (1988)

Georgia competed in the 2022 Winter Paralympics at Beijing, China which took place between 4–13 March 2022.

== Competitors ==
The following is the list of number of competitors participating at the Games per sport/discipline.

Sport	Men	Women	Total
Cross-country skiing	1	0	1
Total	1	0	1

== Cross-country skiing ==
Temuri Dadiani competed in cross-country skiing. He also represented Georgia at the 2018 Winter Paralympics held in Pyeongchang, South Korea.

Men's distance

Athlete	Event	Final	
Athlete	Event	Time	Rank
Temuri Dadiani	10 km free sitting	52:22.4	34

Sprint

Athlete	Event	Qualification		Semifinal		Final	
Athlete	Event	Time	Rank	Time	Rank	Time	Rank
Temuri Dadiani	1.5 km sprint sitting	3:04.97	35	did not advance			

== See also ==
- Georgia at the Paralympics
- Georgia at the 2022 Winter Olympics
