= Georgia at the 2008 Summer Paralympics =

- Flag of Georgia
- IPC code: GEO
- NPC: Georgian Paralympic Committee

in Beijing
- Competitors: 1 in 1 sport
- Flag bearers: Iago Gorgodze (opening & closing)
- Medals Ranked -th: Gold 0 Silver 0 Bronze 0 Total 0

Summer Paralympics appearances (overview)
- 2008; 2012; 2016; 2020; 2024

Other related appearances
- Soviet Union (1988)

Georgia sent a delegation to compete at the 2008 Summer Paralympics in Beijing, People's Republic of China. The country was represented by a single athlete who competed in powerlifting.

== Powerlifting ==
Men

Athlete	Event	Result	Rank
Iago Gorgodze	-90 kg	140.0	8

== See also ==
- Georgia at the Paralympics
- Georgia at the 2008 Summer Olympics
