= Ulambayar Sürenjav =

Mongolian parataekwondo practitioner (born 2000)

Personal information
- Native name: Уламбаяр Сүрэнжав
- Nationality: Mongolia
- Born: 9 January 2000 (age 26) Mongolia

Sport
- Country: Mongolia
- Sport: Para Taekwondo
- Disability class: F44
- Weight class: 52kg

Achievements and titles
- Olympic finals: (gold) (2024)
- World finals: (bronze) (2023)
- Regional finals: (silver) (2023)
Medal record
Women's Para Taekwondo
Representing Mongolia
Paralympic Games
Gold medal – first place	2024 Paris	‍–‍52 kg
World Championships
Bronze medal – third place	2023 Veracruz	-52 kg
Asian Para Games
Silver medal – second place	2022 Hangzhou	52 kg
Gold medal – first place	2026 Aichi-Nagoya	52 kg
European Championships
Gold medal – first place	2024 Belgrade	-52 kg

Ulambayar Sürenjav (Mongolian: Уламбаяр Сүрэнжав; born 9 January 2000) is a Mongolian parataekwondo practitioner. She won the gold medal at the 2024 Summer Paralympics in the –52 kg category. She also won a bronze medal at the World Para Taekwondo Championships in 2023.

== Early life ==
Surenjav was born on 9 January 2000.

== Career ==
Surenjav won the gold medal in her category at the Taekwondo European Open Championships held in Brisbane, Australia in July 2023. She then won a bronze medal at the World Para Taekwondo Championships in September 2023. The following month, she won the gold medal at the 2022 Asian Para Games in the 52 kg event. Surenjav competed in the 2024 European Taekwondo Championships, where she won the gold medal in the -52 kg category. She qualified at the 2024 Summer Paralympics in the –52 kg category, having qualified via World Ranking. In the 52 kg event, she defeated Zahra Rahimi in the gold medal match, becoming the first Mongolian woman to win a Paralympic gold medal.
