= Powerlifting at the 2024 Summer Paralympics – Men's +107 kg =

Powerlifting – Men's +107 kg at the XVII Paralympic Games
- Venue: Porte de La Chapelle Arena, Paris
- Date: 8 September 2024
- Competitors: 8 from 8 nations

Medalists
1st place, gold medalist(s)		Ahmad Aminzadeh	Iran
2nd place, silver medalist(s)		Anton Kriukov	Ukraine
3rd place, bronze medalist(s)		Akaki Jintcharadze	Georgia

The men's +107 kg powerlifting event at the 2024 Summer Paralympics was contested on 8 September at Porte de La Chapelle Arena, Paris.

== Records ==
There are twenty powerlifting events, corresponding to ten weight classes each for men and women. Prior to this competition, the existing world and Paralympic records were as follows.

World Record	Siamand Rahman (IRI)	310 kg	Rio de Janeiro, Brazil	14 September 2016
Paralympic Record	Siamand Rahman (IRI)	310 kg	Rio de Janeiro, Brazil	14 September 2016

== Results ==
Rank	Name	Body weight (kg)	Attempts (kg)			Result (kg)
Rank	Name	Body weight (kg)	1	2	3	Result (kg)
1st place, gold medalist(s)	Ahmad Aminzadeh (IRI)	139.1	253	258	263	263
2nd place, silver medalist(s)	Anton Kriukov (UKR)	119.2	240	247	251	251
3rd place, bronze medalist(s)	Akaki Jintcharadze (GEO)	124.1	238	244	250	250
4	Eglain Mena (COL)	118.8	232	236	~~237~~	236
5	Liam McGarry (GBR)	151.1	220	~~228~~	228	228
6	Amr Mosaad (EGY)	128.8	225	~~235~~	~~237~~	225
7	Tahiru Haruna (GHA)	157.7	210	~~221~~	~~221~~	210
–	Jamil Elshebli (JOR)	133.2	~~242~~	~~242~~	NA	DNF
