= Judo at the 2020 Summer Paralympics – Men's +100 kg =

Judo – Men's +100 kg at the XVI Paralympic Games
- Venue: Nippon Budokan
- Date: 29 August 2021
- Competitors: 10 from 10 nations

Medalists
1st place, gold medalist(s)		Mohammadreza Kheirollahzadeh	Iran
2nd place, silver medalist(s)		Revaz Chikoidze	Georgia
3rd place, bronze medalist(s)		Ilham Zakiyev	Azerbaijan
3rd place, bronze medalist(s)		Choi Gwang-geun	South Korea

The men's +100 kg judo competition at the 2020 Summer Paralympics was held on 29 August 2021 at the Nippon Budokan.

== Results ==
=== Bracket ===
Round of 16
Ilham Zakiyev (AZE)	01
Jack Hodgson (GBR)	00
Wilians Araujo (BRA)	00
Yordani Fernández (CUB)	10

Quarterfinals
Mohammadreza Kheirollahzadeh (IRI)	10
Theador Subba (JAM)	00
Choi Gwang-geun (KOR)	01
Ilham Zakiyev (AZE)	00
Shirin Sharipov (UZB)	01
Yordani Fernández (CUB)	00
Revaz Chikoidze (GEO)	10
Kento Masaki (JPN)	00

Semifinals
Mohammadreza Kheirollahzadeh (IRI)	10
Choi Gwang-geun (KOR)	00
Shirin Sharipov (UZB)	00
Revaz Chikoidze (GEO)	10

Final
Mohammadreza Kheirollahzadeh (IRI)	10
Revaz Chikoidze (GEO)	00

=== Repechage ===
Repechage
Theador Subba (JAM)	00
Ilham Zakiyev (AZE)	10

Bronze medal
Ilham Zakiyev (AZE)	Bye
Shirin Sharipov (UZB)

Repechage
Kento Masaki (JPN)	00
Yordani Fernández (CUB)	10

Bronze medal
Yordani Fernández (CUB)	00
Choi Gwang-geun (KOR)	10
