= Athletics at the 2024 Summer Paralympics – Men's shot put F53 =

Men's shot put F53 at the XVII Paralympic Games
- Venue: Stade de France, Paris
- Date: 1 September 2024
- Competitors: 7 from 7 nations

Medalists
1st place, gold medalist(s)		Giga Ochkhikidze (GEO)
2nd place, silver medalist(s)		Abdelillah Gani (MAR)
3rd place, bronze medalist(s)		Alireza Mokhtari Hemami (IRI)

The Athletics at the 2024 Summer Paralympics – Men's shot put F53 event at the 2024 Summer Paralympics in Paris, took place on 1 September 2024.

== Classification ==
The F53 classification is for athletes with good shoulder and elbow and wrist strength, with weaknesses in fingers only, and little to no movement in their legs or torso. Athletes throw from a seated position.

== Records ==
Prior to the competition, the existing records were as follows:

World record	Abdelillah Gani (MAR)	8.84m	(Morocco) Marrakesh	28 April 2024
Paralympic record	Elvin Astanov (AZE)	8.77m	(Japan) Tokyo	29 August 2021

== Results ==
=== Final ===
The final in this classification took place on 1 September 2024:

Rank	Athlete	Nationality	Class	1	2	3	4	5	6	Best	Notes
1st place, gold medalist(s)	Giga Ochkhikidze	Georgia	F53	x	x	x	9.66	x	x	9.66	WR
2nd place, silver medalist(s)	Abdelillah Gani	Morocco	F53	8.98	9.10	9.06	x	9.22	9.17	9.22	AR
3rd place, bronze medalist(s)	Alireza Mokhtari Hemami	Iran	F53	7.94	8.35	8.54	8.69	x	8.58	8.69	SB
4	Bartosz Gorczak	Poland	F53	8.30	8.25	8.41	x	x	x	8.41	PB
5	Alaa Abdulsalam	Syria	F53	x	8.05	8.18	7.89	8.11	x	8.18	PB
6	Aleš Kisý	Czech Republic	F53	7.64	x	7.80	7.85	7.98	8.12	8.12	SB
7	Marijan Presecan	Croatia	F53	6.44	6.78	7.05	6.55	6.99	6.98	7.05	

Notes: Giga Ochkhikidze's 1st and 4th attempts were originally voided after a protest by the Moroccan delegation was upheld. After appeal his 4th attempt was reinstated.
