= Taekwondo at the 2024 Summer Paralympics – Women's 52 kg =

Taekwondo – Women's 52 kg K44 at the XVII Paralympic Games
- Venue: Grand Palais, Paris
- Date: 29 August 2024
- Competitors: 12 from 12 nations

Medalists
1st place, gold medalist(s)		Surenjav Ulambayar (MGL)
2nd place, silver medalist(s)		Zahra Rahimi (IRI)
3rd place, bronze medalist(s)		Ana Japaridze (GEO)
3rd place, bronze medalist(s)		Meryem Betül Çavdar (TUR)

The women's 52 kg taekwondo competition at the 2024 Summer Paralympics was held on 29 August 2024 at the Grand Palais, Paris. 12 athletes took part.

== Format ==
All the taekwondo events at the 2024 Paralympic Games are run as single elimination with a repechage system. The four highest ranked players at each weight class are given byes to the quarter final, the remaining players contest the round of 16.

The players that lose in the quarter-finals enter the first round of the repechage system, The two losing quarterfinalists from each half of the draw face each other, again in single elimination. The two winners of these repechage rounds each face the losing semifinalist from the opposite half of the draw in the bronze medal finals.

== Results ==
Bracket

Key

- GDP = Win by Golden Point
- GR = Golden Round
- PTF = Win by Final Score
- SUP = Win by Superiority

Round of 16

Quarter-finals

Semi-finals

Gold medal match

29 August, South Paris Arena

Jessica Garcia Quijano (MEX)
10

29 August, South Paris Arena

Milana Krassavtseva (KAZ)
8

Milana Krassavtseva (KAZ)
10

29 August, South Paris Arena

Elisabeth Geraldo (DOM)
8

Jessica Garcia Quijano (MEX)
5

29 August, South Paris Arena

Surenjav Ulambayar (MGL)
13

Salma Moneem Hassan (EGY)
12

29 August, South Paris Arena

Neema Stency Obonyo (KEN)
3

Salma Moneem Hassan (EGY)
5

Surenjav Ulambayar (MGL)
7

29 August, South Paris Arena

Surenjav Ulambayar (MGL)
5

Zahra Rahimi (IRI)
2

29 August, South Paris Arena

Maria Eduarda Machado Stumpf (BRA)
4

29 August, South Paris Arena

Zahra Rahimi (IRI)
6

Zahra Rahimi (IRI)
13

29 August, South Paris Arena

Shao Qian (CHN)
2

Zahra Rahimi (IRI)
6

29 August, South Paris Arena

Ana Japaridze (GEO)
0

Ana Japaridze (GEO)
22

29 August, South Paris Arena

Ariana Aguila Ramos (USA)
2

Ana Japaridze (GEO)
7

Meryem Betül Çavdar (TUR)
6

Repechage

Repechage match
29 August, South Paris Arena
Milana Krassavtseva (KAZ)	1
Salma Moneem Hassan (EGY)	8

Bronze medal match
29 August, South Paris Arena
Ana Japaridze (GEO)	PTF
Salma Moneem Hassan (EGY)	4

Repechage match
29 August, South Paris Arena
Maria Eduarda Machado Stumpf (BRA)	6
Meryem Betül Çavdar (TUR)	8

Bronze medal match
29 August, South Paris Arena
Jessica Garcia Quijano (MEX)	3
Meryem Betül Çavdar (TUR)	6
