= Mohammadreza Kheirollahzadeh =

Iranian Paralympic judoka

Personal information
- Native name: Mohammadreza Kheirollahzadeh Varzi
- Nationality: Iranian
- Born: 20 January 1993 (age 33) Iran
- Occupation: Judoka

Sport
- Sport: Paralympic judo
Medal record
Men's paralympic judo
Representing Iran
Paralympic Games
Gold medal – first place	2020 Tokyo	Men's +100kg
Asian Para Games
Silver medal – second place	2018 Jakarta	+100 kg
Silver medal – second place	2018 Jakarta	Team open

Mohammadreza Kheirollahzadeh Varzi (born 20 January 1993), also known as Mohammadreza Kheirollahzadeh, is an Iranian Paralympic judoka. At the 2020 Summer Paralympics, he won gold in the Men's +100 kg event.
