= Zahra Rahimi =

Iranian parataekwondo practitioner (born 2008)

Personal information
- Nationality: Iranian
- Born: 2 November 2008 (age 17) Marand, Iran

Sport
- Sport: Para taekwondo
- Event: –52 kg
Medal record
Women's para taekwondo
Representing Iran
Summer Paralympics
Silver medal – second place	2024 Paris	–52 kg

Zahra Rahimi (born 2 November 2008) is an Iranian para taekwondo practitioner. She represented Iran at the 2024 Summer Paralympics.

== Career ==
She represented Iran at the 2024 Summer Paralympics and won a silver medal in the 52 kg category.
