= Ana Japaridze =

Georgian parataekwondo practitioner (born 2005)

Personal information
- Nationality: Georgian
- Born: 25 May 2005 (age 21)

Sport
- Sport: Para Taekwondo
- Disability class: F44
Medal record
Women's Para Taekwondo
Representing Georgia
Summer Paralympics
| Bronze medal – third place | 2024 Paris | -52 kg |
European Championships
| Gold medal – first place | 2026 Munich | -52 kg |
| Bronze medal – third place | 2022 Manchester | -47 kg |
| Bronze medal – third place | 2023 Rotterdam | -52 kg |

Ana Japaridze (ანა ჯაფარიძე; born 25 May 2005) is a Georgian parataekwondo practitioner. She competed at the 2024 Summer Paralympics in the –52 kg category, winning the bronze medal.

== Career ==
Japaridze competed in the 2022 European Taekwondo Championships, where she won the bronze medal in the -47 kg category. At the European Para-Taekwondo Qualification Tournament in 2024, she won a gold medal there, enabling her to compete at the 2024 Summer Paralympics in the –52 kg category.
