= Giga Ochkhikidze =

Georgian Paralympic athlete (born 1990)

Personal information
- Nationality: Georgian
- Born: 14 November 1990 (age 35)

Sport
- Sport: Para-athletics
- Disability class: F53
- Event: shot put
Medal record
Para-athletics
Representing Georgia
Paralympic Games
Gold medal – first place	2024 Paris	Shot put F53
World Championships
Gold medal – first place	2024 Kobe	Shot put F53

Giga Ochkhikidze (born 14 November 1990) is a Georgian para-athlete specializing in shot put. He represented Georgia at the 2024 Summer Paralympics.

== Career ==
Ochkhikidze represented Georgia at the 2024 World Para Athletics Championships and won a gold medal in the shot put F53 event with a Championship record of 8.79 metres. As a result, he qualified for the 2024 Summer Paralympics. At the 2024 Summer Paralympics, he won a gold medal in the shot put F53 event with a World Record throw of 9.66 metres. An appeal of the national delegation against a false attempt led to Ochkhikidze's medal being revoked. His gold medal was later reinstated following another appeal.
