= Vladimer Tchintcharauli =

Georgian Paralympic shooter (born 1981)

Personal information
- Born: 15 September 1981 (age 44) Tbilisi, Georgia

Sport
- Country: Georgia
- Sport: Shooting para sport
- Disability class: SH2
Medal record
Men's shooting para sport
Representing Georgia
Paralympic Games
Silver medal – second place	2024 Paris	Mixed 50 m rifle prone SH2

Vladimer Tchintcharauli (born 15 September 1981) is a Georgian Paralympic shooter.

== Career ==
Tchintcharauli represented Georgia at the 2024 Summer Paralympics and won a silver medal in the Mixed 50 metre rifle prone SH2 event.
