= Nino Tibilashvili =

Georgian wheelchair fencer

Personal information
- Born: 11 May 1997 (age 29)

Sport
- Country: Georgia
- Sport: Wheelchair fencing
Medal record
Paralympic Games
Silver medal – second place	2020 Tokyo	Sabre A
Bronze medal – third place	2024 Paris	Sabre A

Nino Tibilashvili (born 11 May 1997) is a Georgian wheelchair fencer. She won the silver medal in the women's sabre A event at the 2020 Summer Paralympics held in Tokyo, Japan and the bronze medal in the Sabre A event at the 2024 Summer Paralympics in Paris, France.
