= Giorgi Kaldani =

Georgian Paralympic judoka (born 1992)

Personal information
- Nationality: Georgian
- Born: 24 March 1992 (age 34)
- Home town: Sukhumi, Georgia

Sport
- Country: Georgia
- Sport: Para judo
- Disability class: J2
- Weight class: −73 kg
Medal record
Men's para judo
Representing Georgia
Paralympic Games
Silver medal – second place	2024 Paris	−73 kg J2
European Para Championships
Gold medal – first place	2023 Rotterdam	−73 kg J2

Giorgi Kaldani (born 24 March 1992) is a Georgian Paralympic judoka. He represented his country at the 2020 and 2024 Summer Paralympics.

== Career ==
Kaldani represented Georgia at the 2024 Summer Paralympics and won a silver medal in the −73 kg J2 event.
