= Revaz Chikoidze =

Georgian Paralympic judoka (born 1984)

Sport
- Sport: Paralympic judo
Medal record
Men's paralympic judo
Representing Georgia
Paralympic Games
Silver medal – second place	2020 Tokyo	Men's +100kg
Silver medal – second place	2024 Paris	+90 kg

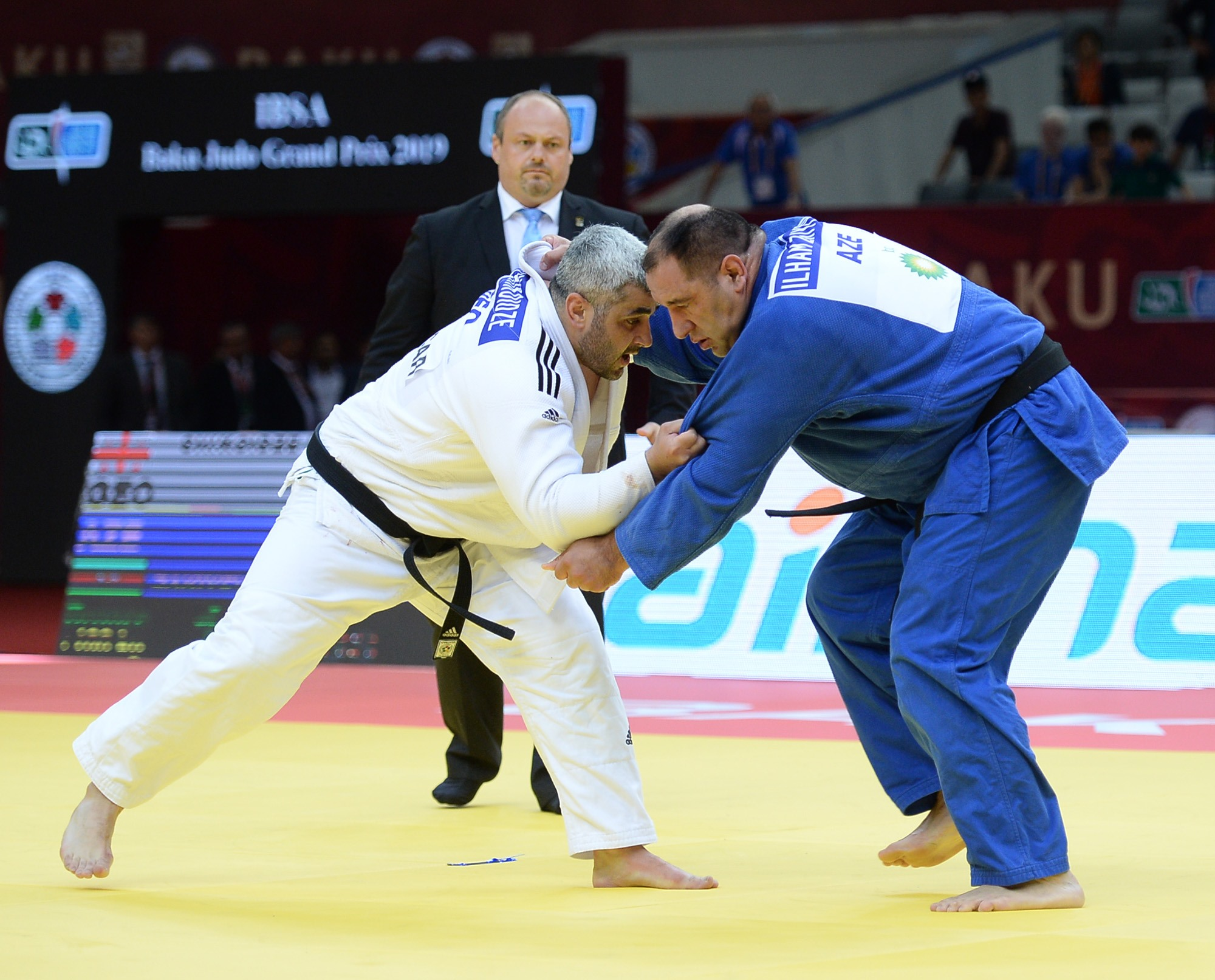
Ilham Zakiyev and Revaz Chikoidze at the 2019 IBSA Judo Grand Prix Baku

Revaz Chikoidze (born 30 May 1984) is a Georgian Paralympic judoka. He won silver in the Men's +100 kg in 2020.
