= Zurab Zurabiani =

Georgian Paralympic judoka (born 2000)

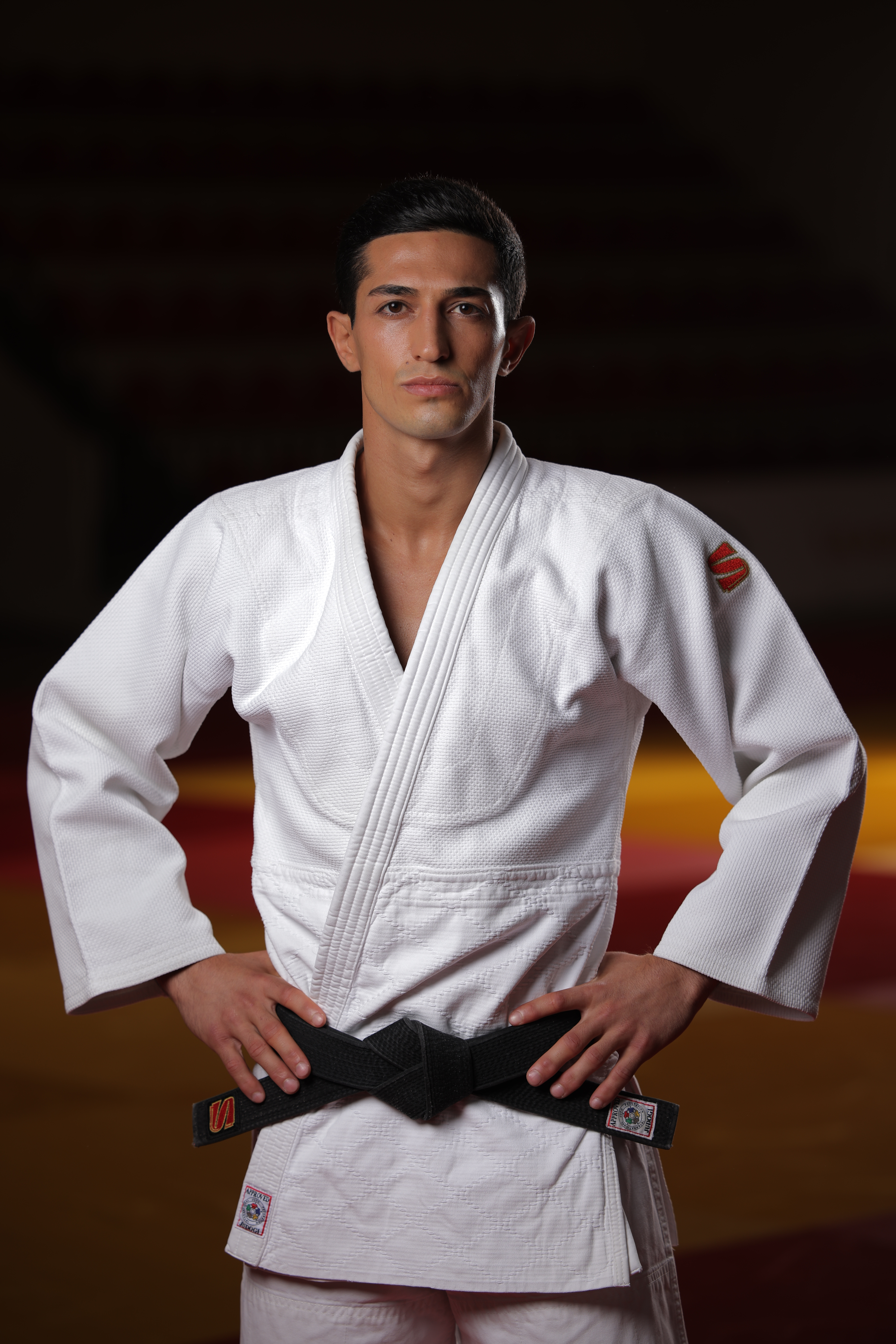

Personal information
- Nationality: Georgian
- Born: 2 February 2000 (age 26)
- Home town: Tbilisi
- Occupation: Judoka
- Height: 175
- Weight: 70

Sport
- Country: Georgia
- Sport: Para judo
- Disability class: J2
- Weight class: −60 kg
Medal record
Men's para judo
Representing Georgia
Paralympic Games
| Silver medal – second place | 2024 Paris | −60 kg J2 |
Para Judo World Championships
| Bronze medal – third place | 2022 Baku | −60 kg J2 |
European Para Championships
| Bronze medal – third place | 2023 Rotterdam | −60 kg J2 |
| Silver medal – second place | 2022 Cagliari | −60 kg J2 |

Zurab Zurabiani (born 2 February 2000) is a Georgian Paralympic judoka. He represented Georgia at the 2024 Summer Paralympics and won a silver medal in the −60 kg J2 event.

== Career ==
Zurabiani represented Georgia at the 2024 Summer Paralympics and won a silver medal in the −60 kg J2 event.
