= Ina Kaldani =

Georgian Paralympic judoka

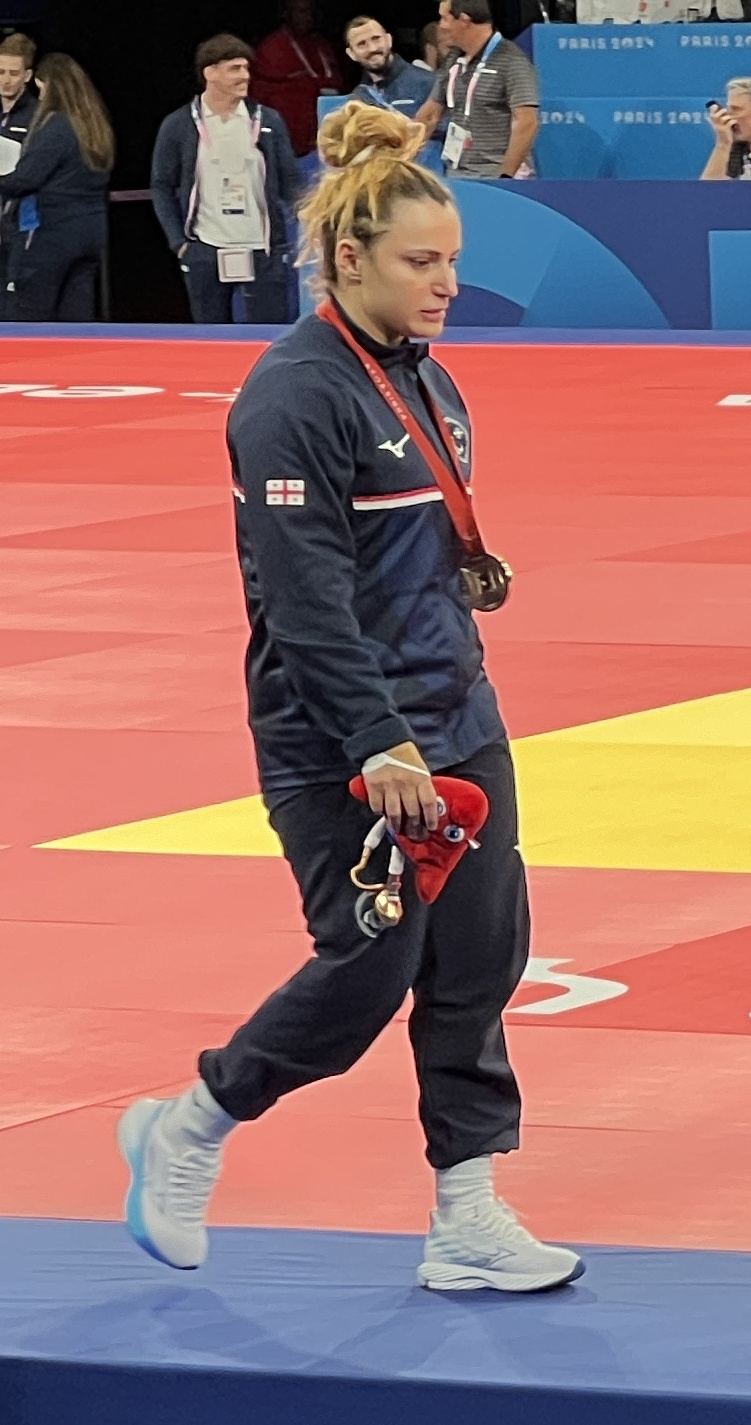

Personal information
- Born: 7 August 1997 (age 28)

Sport
- Country: Georgia
- Sport: Judo
- Disability: Vision impairment
Medal record
Women's judo
Representing Georgia
Paralympic Games
Silver medal – second place	2020 Tokyo	70 kg
European Para Championships
Silver medal – second place	2023 Rotterdam	70 kg J2

Ina Kaldani (born 7 August 1997) is a visually impaired Georgian Paralympic judoka. She won the silver medal in the women's 70 kg event at the 2020 Summer Paralympics held in Tokyo, Japan.
