= Irma Khetsuriani =

Georgian wheelchair fencer

Irma Khetsuriani (Georgian: ირმა ხეცურიანი; born on 18 September 1985 in Sukhumi, Georgian SSR) is a Georgian wheelchair fencer. She won the world championship in October 2015, which was held in France, and again in 2017 in Rome, and in 2018 in Warsaw, Poland. She won silver in the sabre B discipline in the world championships held in Eger, Hungary, in 2015.

She is the first wheelchair fencer in Georgia, and took up the sport after it was suggested to her by the country's paralympic committee. She has a spinal disease.

At the 2015 International Wheelchair and Amputee Sports Federation world cup event she competed in all three fencing disciplines of épée, sabre and foil, while most other competitors competed in only one discipline.
