= Akaki Jintcharadze =

Georgian powerlifter (born 1987)

Personal information
- Born: 19 July 1987 (age 38) Georgian SSR, Soviet Union

Sport
- Country: Georgia
- Sport: Powerlifting
- Event: +107kg
Medal record
Powerlifting
Representing Georgia
Paralympic Games
Bronze medal – third place	2024 Paris	+107 kg

Akaki Jintcharadze (born 19 July 1987) is a Georgian Paralympic powerlifter. He represented Georgia at the 2016, 2020 and 2024 Summer Paralympics, winning a bronze medal in the 2024 edition.

In his third Paralympic appearance, Jintcharadze won the bronze medal in the men's +107 kg event at the 2024 Summer Paralympics.
