= Georgian Paralympic Committee =

National Paralympic Committee of Georgia

National Paralympic Committee
- Country: Georgia
- Code: GEO
- Created: 2003
- Headquarters: Tbilisi, Georgia
- President: Shalva Maisuradze

Georgian Paralympic Committee is the National Paralympic Committee in Georgia for the Paralympic Games movement. It is a non-profit organisation that selects teams, and raises funds to send Georgian competitors to Paralympic events organised by the International Paralympic Committee (IPC).

Shalva Maisuradze is the organization's president. Irma Khetsuriani, a member of the Georgian national wheelchair fencing team, works for the Georgian Paralympic Committee as an office manager.

The country's NPC was established in 2003. The country would first send competitors to the Paralympic Games in 2008. David Maisuradze was in charge of the organization from 2003 to 2011. In 2011, the organization approved a new charter and Levan Odisharia became the new president. In 2013, the NPC signed a memorandum of understanding with the Georgian Ministry of Defence, with the goal of integrating wounded soldiers into the country's Paralympic programs. In 2014, Kenyan wheelchair track and field competitor Anne Walufa Strike visited the Georgian Paralympic Committee as part of the Agitos Foundation's WoMentoring. She was there to mentor Revazishvili, an equestrian competitor.

== See also ==
- Georgia at the Paralympics
