= Germany at the 2024 Summer Paralympics =

- Flag of Germany
- IPC code: GER
- NPC: National Paralympic Committee Germany

in Paris, France August 28, 2024 – September 8, 2024
- Competitors: 142 in 18 sports
- Flag bearers (opening): Edina Müller; Martin Schulz
- Flag bearers (closing): Elena Krawzow; Maurice Schmidt
- Medals Ranked 11th: Gold 10 Silver 14 Bronze 25 Total 49

Summer Paralympics appearances (overview)
- 1960; 1964; 1968; 1972; 1976; 1980; 1984; 1988; 1992; 1996; 2000; 2004; 2008; 2012; 2016; 2020; 2024

Other related appearances
- East Germany (1984)

Germany competed at the 2024 Summer Paralympics in Paris, France, from 28 August to 8 September.

== Medalists ==
Medal	Name	Sport	Event	Date
Gold	Tanja Scholz	Swimming	Women's 150 metre individual medley SM4	1 September
Gold	Josia Topf	Swimming	Men's 150 metre individual medley SM3	1 September
Gold	Natascha Hiltrop	Shooting	R8 – Women's 50 metre rifle 3 positions SH1	3 September
Gold	Maurice Schmidt	Wheelchair fencing	Men's sabre A	3 September
Gold	Maike Hausberger	Cycling	Women's road time trial C1–2–3	4 September
Gold	Markus Rehm	Athletics	Men's long jump T64	4 September
Gold	Natascha Hiltrop	Shooting	R6 – Mixed 50 metre rifle prone SH1	5 September
Gold	Taliso Engel	Swimming	Men's 100 metre breaststroke SB13	5 September
Gold	Elena Krawzow	Swimming	Women's 100 metre breaststroke SB12	5 September
Gold	Sandra Mikolaschek	Table tennis	Women's individual Class 4	7 September
Silver	Stephanie Grebe; Juliane Wolf	Table tennis	Women's doubles WD14	30 August
Silver	Valentin Baus; Thomas Schmidberger	Table tennis	Men's doubles MD8	31 August
Silver	Max Gelhaar	Paratriathlon	Men's PTS3	2 September
Silver	Niko Kappel	Athletics	Men's shot put F41	2 September
Silver	Josia Topf	Swimming	Men's 50 metre backstroke S3	2 September
Silver	Michael Teuber	Cycling	Men's road time trial C1	4 September
Silver	Regine Mispelkamp	Equestrian	Individual championship test grade V	4 September
Silver	Nele Moos	Athletics	Women's long jump T38	5 September
Silver	Thomas Schmidberger	Table tennis	Men's individual Class 3	5 September
Silver	Johannes Floors	Athletics	Men's 400 metres T62	6 September
Silver	Tanja Scholz	Swimming	Women's 50 metre freestyle	6 September
Silver	Anna-Lena Niehues	Equestrian	Individual freestyle test grade IV	7 September
Silver	Regine Mispelkamp	Equestrian	Individual freestyle test grade V	7 September
Silver	Gina Böttcher	Swimming	Women's 50 metre backstroke S4	7 September
Bronze	Maurice Wetekam	Swimming	Men's 100 metre breaststroke SB9	30 August
Bronze	Maike Hausberger	Cycling	Women's track time trial C1–3	31 August
Bronze	Mira Jeanne Maack	Swimming	Women's 100 metre backstroke S8	31 August
Bronze	Jan Helmich; Hermine Krumbein	Rowing	PR3 mixed double sculls	1 September
Bronze	Thomas Ulbricht	Cycling	Men's track time trial B	1 September
Bronze	Thomas Wandschneider	Badminton	Men's singles WH1	2 September
Bronze	Anja Renner	Paratriathlon	Women's PTVI	2 September
Bronze	Martin Schulz	Paratriathlon	Men's PTS5	2 September
Bronze	Felix Streng	Athletics	Men's 100 metres T64	2 September
Bronze	Irmgard Bensusan	Athletics	Women's 200 metres T64	3 September
Bronze	Annika Zeyen-Giles	Cycling	Women's road time trial H1–2–3	4 September
Bronze	Anna-Lena Niehues	Equestrian	Individual championship test grade IV	4 September
Bronze	Matthias Schindler	Cycling	Men's road time trial C3	4 September
Bronze	Annika Zeyen-Giles	Cycling	Women's road race H1–2–3–4	5 September
Bronze	Katrin Müller-Rottgardt	Athletics	Women's 100 metres T12	5 September
Bronze	Juliane Wolf	Table tennis	Women's individual Class 8	6 September
Bronze	Lennart Sass	Judo	Men's 73 kg J1	6 September
Bronze	Anna-Lena Niehues; Regine Mispelkamp; Heidemarie Dresing	Equestrian	Team	6 September
Bronze	Josia Topf	Swimming	Men's 50 metre freestyle S3	6 September
Bronze	Heidemarie Dresing	Equestrian	Individual freestyle test grade II	7 September
Bronze	Germany men's national wheelchair basketball team: Nico Dreimüller; Matthias Güntner; Tobias Hell; Lukas Gloßner; Jan Haller; Jan Sadler; Jens-Eike Albrecht; Thomas Böhme; Aliaksandr Halouski; Alexander Budde; Thomas Reier; Julian Lammering	Wheelchair basketball	Men's tournament	7 September
Bronze	Lindy Ave	Athletics	Women's 400 metres T38	7 September
Bronze	Edina Müller	Paracanoeing	Women's KL1	8 September
Bronze	Anja Adler	Paracanoeing	Women's KL2	8 September
Bronze	Felicia Laberer	Paracanoeing	Women's KL3	8 September

== Competitors ==
The following is the list of number of competitors in the Games.

Sport	Men	Women	Total
Archery	0	1	1
Athletics	10	16	26
Badminton	3	0	3
Boccia	1	1	2
Cycling	5	4	9
Equestrian	0	4	4
Judo	3	3	6
Paracanoeing	0	3	3
Paratriathlon	2	3	5
Rowing	4	3	7
Shooting	4	1	5
Sitting volleyball	12	0	12
Swimming	5	7	12
Table tennis	5	4	9
Wheelchair basketball	12	12	24
Wheelchair fencing	1	0	1
Wheelchair rugby	10	2	12
Wheelchair tennis	0	1	1
Total	77	65	142

== Archery ==
Germany entered one female archers into the games by virtue of her result at the 2023 European Championships in Rotterdam, Netherlands.

Athlete	Event	Ranking Round		Round of 32	Round of 16	Quarterfinals	Semifinals	Finals	
Athlete	Event	Score	Seed	Opposition Score	Opposition Score	Opposition Score	Opposition Score	Opposition Score	Rank
Flora Kliem	Women's individual recurve	578	11	Campos (PER); W 6–2	Lavrinc (SLO); L 4–6	Did not advance			

== Athletics ==
German track and field athletes achieved quota places for the following events based on their results at the 2023 World Championships, 2024 World Championships, or through high performance allocation, as long as they meet the minimum entry standard (MES).

Key

- Note–Ranks given for track events are within the athlete's heat only
- Q = Qualified for the next round
- q = Qualified for the next round as a fastest loser or, in field events, by position without achieving the qualifying target
- DQ = Disqualified
- PR = Paralympic Record
- AR = Area (or continental) Record
- NR = National Record
- SB = Season's Best
- N/A = Round not applicable for the event
- Bye = Athlete not required to compete in round

Track & road events
Men

Athlete	Event	Heat		Semifinal		Final	
Athlete	Event	Result	Rank	Result	Rank	Result	Rank
Marcel Böttger	100 m T11	11.34	2 q	11.36	3	Did not advance	
Max Marzillier	100 m T13	11.46	5	—N/a		Did not advance	
Phil Grolla	100 m T47	10.94	6	—N/a		Did not advance	
Léon Schäfer	100 m T63	12.11	1 Q	—N/a		12.12	4
Johannes Floors	100 m T64	10.92	2 Q	—N/a		10.85	4
Felix Streng	100 m T64	10.79	2 Q	—N/a		10.77	3rd place, bronze medalist(s)
Felix Streng	200 m T64	22.31	2 Q	—N/a		DQ	
Max Marzillier	400 m T13	—N/a				50.49	6
Johannes Floors	400 m T62	—N/a				46.90 SB	2nd place, silver medalist(s)

Women

Athlete	Event	Heat		Semifinal		Final	
Athlete	Event	Result	Rank	Result	Rank	Result	Rank
Katrin Müller-Rottgardt	100 m T12	12.32 SB	1 Q	12.26 SB	1 Q	12.26 =SB	3rd place, bronze medalist(s)
Isabelle Foerder	100 m T35	—N/a				16.36	8
Nicole Nicoleitzik	100 m T36	11.95	6	—N/a		Did not advance	
Laura Burbulla	100 m T37	15.33 SB	6	—N/a		Did not advance	
Lindy Ave	100 m T38	13.08 SB	5	—N/a		Did not advance	
Friederike Brose	100 m T38	13.80	8	—N/a		Did not advance	
Nele Moos	100 m T38	13.38 PB	7	—N/a		Did not advance	
Jule Ross	100 m T47	12.72 PB	5	—N/a		Did not advance	
Kim Marie Vaske	100 m T47	13.22	8	—N/a		Did not advance	
Irmgard Bensusan	100 m T64	13.20	3 Q	—N/a		13.31	8
Katrin Müller-Rottgardt	200 m T12	25.20 SB	1 Q	25.15 SB	2	Did not advance	
Isabelle Foerder	200 m T35	—N/a				34.39	7
Nicole Nicoleitzik	200 m T36	30.88	4 q	—N/a		31.72	8
Jule Ross	200 m T47	25.93 PB	4	—N/a		Did not advance	
Kim Marie Vaske	200 m T47	27.17 PB	4	—N/a		Did not advance	
Irmgard Bensusan	200 m T64	27.40	2 Q	—N/a		26.77 SB	3rd place, bronze medalist(s)
Lindy Ave	400 m T38	1:01.58	3 Q	—N/a		1:00.37 SB	3rd place, bronze medalist(s)
Nele Moos	400 m T38	1:01.56	4 q	—N/a		1:00.91 PB	7
Jule Ross	400 m T47	1:01.08	4 q	—N/a		59.47	8
Merle Menje	800 m T54	1:52.83	6	—N/a		Did not advance	
Merle Menje	1500 m T54	3:21.86	6	—N/a		Did not advance	
Merle Menje	5000 m T54	12:44.17	2 Q	—N/a		11:49.97	7
Merle Menje	Marathon T54	—N/a				1:55:54	9

Field events
Men

Athlete	Event	Final	
Athlete	Event	Distance	Position
Andreas Walser	Long jump T12	6.73 SB	6
Léon Schäfer	Long jump T63	6.93	4
Noah Bodelier	Long jump T64	6.98	6
Markus Rehm	Long jump T64	8.13	1st place, gold medalist(s)
Yannis Fischer	Shot put F40	10.56	6
Niko Kappel	Shot put F41	13.74	2nd place, silver medalist(s)

Women

Athlete	Event	Final	
Athlete	Event	Distance	Position
Katrin Müller-Rottgardt	Long jump T12	4.91	5
Laura Burbulla	Long jump T37	3.95	7
Friederike Brose	Long jump T38	4.35	9
Nele Moos	Long jump T38	5.13 PB	2nd place, silver medalist(s)
Jule Ross	Long jump T47	4.84	11
Charleen Kosche	Shot put F34	7.22	6
Kim Marie Vaske	Shot put F46	9.04	15
Lisa Martin Wagner	Shot put F64	10.56 PB	7
Frances Herrmann	Javelin throw F34	17.18	5
Lise Petersen	Javelin throw F46	36.62	8
Martina Willing	Javelin throw F56	18.96	6

== Badminton ==
Germany has qualified three para badminton players for the following events, through the release of BWF para-badminton Race to Paris Paralympic Ranking.

Athlete	Event	Group Stage				Quarterfinal	Semifinal	Final / BM	
Athlete	Event	Opposition Score	Opposition Score	Opposition Score	Rank	Opposition Score	Opposition Score	Opposition Score	Rank
Thomas Wandschneider	Men's singles WH1	Toupé (FRA); W 2–0 (21–12, 21–17)	Yang (CHN); W 2–1 (24–22, 12–21, 21–16)	—N/a	1 Q	Bye	Qu (CHN); L 0–2 (1–21, 10–21)	Jeong (KOR); W 2–0 (26–24, 21–11)	3rd place, bronze medalist(s)
Rick Cornell Hellmann	Men's singles WH2	Mai (CHN); L 1–2 (19–21, 21–9, 17–21)	Yu (KOR); L 1–2 (21–19, 17–21, 7–21)	—N/a	3	—N/a	Did not advance		
Marcel Adam	Men's singles SL4	Nnanna (NGR); L 0–2 (12–21, 15–21)	Setiawan (INA); L 0–2 (4–21, 15–21)	—N/a	3	—N/a	Did not advance		
Rick Cornell Hellmann; Thomas Wandschneider	Men's doubles WH1–2	Mai / Qu (CHN); L 0–2 (11–21, 17–21)	Kajiwara / Murayama (JPN); L 0–2 (15–21, 5–21)	Bin Noorlan / Ramli (MAS); L 0–2 (19–21, 17–21)	4	—N/a	Did not advance		

== Boccia ==
Boris Nicolai and Anita Raguwaran have qualified to compete.

Athlete	Event	Preliminaries				Quarterfinals	Semifinals	Final	Rank
Athlete	Event	Opposition Score	Opposition Score	Opposition Score	Rank	Opposition Score	Opposition Score	Opposition Score	Rank
Boris Nicolai	Men's individual BC4	Grisales (COL); L 0–11	Larpyen (THA); L 4–5	Allam (EGY); W 6–2	3	Did not advance			10
Anita Raguwaran	Women's individual BC4	Szabó (HUN); L 0–6	Oliveira (POR); W 7–2	Teixeira (BRA); L 2–4	4	Did not advance			13

== Cycling ==
Germany entered two para-cyclist (one in each gender) after finished the top eligible nation's at the 2022 UCI Nation's ranking allocation ranking.

Men's road

Athlete	Event	Time	Rank
Maximilian Jäger	Road race T1–2	1:17:09	4
Maximilian Jäger	Time trial T1–2	25:15.36	8
Matthias Schindler	Road race C1–2–3	1:50:42	11
Matthias Schindler	Time trial C3	39:21.35	3rd place, bronze medalist(s)
Pierre Senska	Road race C1–2–3	DNF	
Pierre Senska	Time trial C1	21:58.34	4
Michael Teuber	Road race C1–2–3	1:58:07	19
Michael Teuber	Time trial C1	21:18.14	2nd place, silver medalist(s)

Women's road

Athlete	Event	Time	Rank
Andrea Eskau	Road race H5	1:52:47	4
Andrea Eskau	Time trial H4–5	26:35.88	6
Maike Hausberger	Road race C1–2–3	1:45:14	9
Maike Hausberger	Time trial C1–2–3	21:30.45	1st place, gold medalist(s)
Jana Majunke	Road race T1–2	1:00:24	4
Jana Majunke	Time trial T1–2	29:40.76	5
Annika Zeyen-Giles	Road race H1–2–3–4	56:15	3rd place, bronze medalist(s)
Annika Zeyen-Giles	Time trial H1–2–3	25:30.84	3rd place, bronze medalist(s)

Men's track

Athlete	Event	Qualification		Final	
Athlete	Event	Time	Rank	Opposition Time	Rank
Pierre Senska	Time trial C1–2–3	1:11.449	10	Did not advance	
Pierre Senska	Individual pursuit C1	3:45.973	4 QB	Ten Argilés (ESP); L 3:50.973	4
Thomas Ulbricht piloted by Robert Förstemann	Time trial B	59.480	1 Q	59.862	3rd place, bronze medalist(s)
Thomas Ulbricht piloted by Robert Förstemann	Individual pursuit B	5:21.994	11	Did not advance	

Women's track

Athlete	Event	Qualification		Final	
Athlete	Event	Time	Rank	Opposition Time	Rank
Maike Hausberger	Time trial C1–2–3	38.462	3 Q	38.358	3rd place, bronze medalist(s)
Maike Hausberger	Individual pursuit C1–2–3	3:49.444	3 QB	Rigling (SUI); L 3:50.985	4

== Equestrian ==
Germany entered a full squad of four para-equestrians into the Paralympic equestrian competition by finishing the top seven nation's at the 2022 FEI World Championships in Herning, Denmark.

Individual

Athlete	Horse	Event	Total	
Athlete	Horse	Event	Score	Rank
Isabell Nowak	Siracusa OLD	Individual championship test grade V	71.282 %	4
Isabell Nowak	Siracusa OLD	Individual freestyle test grade V	73.540 %	4
Anna-Lena Niehues	Quimbaya 6	Individual championship test grade IV	75.222 %	3rd place, bronze medalist(s)
Anna-Lena Niehues	Quimbaya 6	Individual freestyle test grade IV	80.900 %	2nd place, silver medalist(s)
Regine Mispelkamp	Highlander Delight's	Individual championship test grade V	73.231 %	2nd place, silver medalist(s)
Regine Mispelkamp	Highlander Delight's	Individual freestyle test grade V	79.550 %	2nd place, silver medalist(s)
Heidemarie Dresing	Dooloop	Individual championship test grade II	73.103 %	4
Heidemarie Dresing	Dooloop	Individual freestyle test grade II	76.127 %	3rd place, bronze medalist(s)

Team

Athlete	Horse	Event	Individual score	Total	
Athlete	Horse	Event	TT	Score	Rank
Anna-Lena Niehues	See above	Team	75.351 %	223.751 %	3rd place, bronze medalist(s)
Regine Mispelkamp	See above	Team	75.500 %	223.751 %	3rd place, bronze medalist(s)
Heidemarie Dresing	See above	Team	72.900 %	223.751 %	3rd place, bronze medalist(s)

== Judo ==
Ramona Brussig, Daniel-Rafael Goral, Nikolai Kornhaß, Tabea Müller, Lennart Saß and Isabell Thal have qualified to compete.

Men

Athlete	Event	Round of 16	Quarterfinals	Semifinals	Repechage round 1	Repechage round 2	Final/ Bronze medal contest	
Athlete	Event	Opposition Result	Opposition Result	Opposition Result	Opposition Result	Opposition Result	Opposition Result	Rank
Lennart Sass	–73 kg J1	Bye	Iafa (POR); W 10–0	Shamey (KAZ); L 1–10	—N/a		Mamedov (UZB); W 10–0	3rd place, bronze medalist(s)
Nikolai Kornhaß	–73 kg J2	Kuranbaev (UZB); L 0–10	Did not advance		Petit (FRA); L 0–10	Did not advance		9
Daniel-Rafael Goral	–90 kg J2	Bye	Karomatov (UZB); L 0–11	Did not advance	—N/a	Cannizzaro (ITA); L 1–10	Did not advance	7

Women

Athlete	Event	Round of 16	Quarterfinals	Semifinals	Repechage round 1	Repechage round 2	Final/ Bronze medal contest	
Athlete	Event	Opposition Result	Opposition Result	Opposition Result	Opposition Result	Opposition Result	Opposition Result	Rank
Tabea Müller	–48 kg J1	—N/a	Taşın (TUR); L 0–10	Did not advance	—N/a	Ledesma (ARG); L 0–11	Did not advance	7
Isabell Thal	–48 kg J2	—N/a	Martinet (FRA); L 0–11	Did not advance	—N/a	Brussig (SUI); W 10–0	Eke (TUR); L 0–10	5
Ramona Brussig	–57 kg J2	Yeşilyurt (TUR); L 0–11	Did not advance					9

== Paracanoeing ==
Germany earned quota places for the following events through the 2023 ICF Canoe Sprint World Championships in Duisburg, Germany.

Athlete	Event	Heats		Semifinal		Final	
Athlete	Event	Time	Rank	Time	Rank	Time	Rank
Edina Müller	Women's KL1	55.27	2 SF	57.10	1 FA	53.13	3rd place, bronze medalist(s)
Anja Adler	Women's KL2	54.99	3 SF	53.63	1 FA	52.17	3rd place, bronze medalist(s)
Felicia Laberer	Women's KL3	50.23	2 SF	48.59	1 FA	48.79	3rd place, bronze medalist(s)

== Paratriathlon ==
Athlete	Event	Swim	Trans 1	Bike	Trans 2	Run	Total time	Rank
Max Gelhaar	Men's PTS3	11:44	1:24	33:41	0:59	20:55	1:08:43	2nd place, silver medalist(s)
Martin Schulz	Men's PTS5	11:27	0:52	29:35	0:40	16:45	59:19	3rd place, bronze medalist(s)
Neele Ludwig	Women's PTS2	15:30	2:18	42:49	1:18	27:33	1:29:28	8
Anja Renner; Guide: Maria Paulig	Women's PTVI	16:27	1:05	30:49	0:38	19:22	1:08:21	3rd place, bronze medalist(s)
Elke van Engelen	Women's PTS4	18:18	1:54	36:29	0:51	24:18	1:21:50	10

== Rowing ==
German rowers qualified boats in each of the following classes at the 2023 World Rowing Championships in Belgrade, Serbia.

Athlete	Event	Heats		Repechage		Final	
Athlete	Event	Time	Rank	Time	Rank	Time	Rank
Marcus Klemp	PR1 men's single sculls	9:26.88	4 R	9:36.29	3 FB	9:47.43	7
Jan Helmich; Hermine Krumbein	PR3 mixed double sculls	7:12.07	1 FA	Bye		7:28.31	3rd place, bronze medalist(s)
Susanne Lackner; Marc Lembeck; Valentin Luz; Kathrin Marchand; Inga Thöne (cox)	PR3 mixed coxed four	6:56.84	2 FA	Bye		7:03.17	4

Qualification Legend: FA=Final A (medal); FB=Final B (non-medal); R=Repechage

== Shooting ==
Germany entered four para-shooter's after achieved quota places for the following events by virtue of their best finishes at the 2022, 2023 and 2024 world cup, 2022 World Championships, 2023 World Championships, 2023 European Para Championships and 2024 European Championships, as long as they obtained a minimum qualifying score (MQS) by May 31, 2020.

Men

Athlete	Event	Qualification		Final	
Athlete	Event	Points	Rank	Points	Rank
Tobias Meyer	P1 – 10 m air pistol SH1	558	15	Did not advance	

Women

Athlete	Event	Qualification		Final	
Athlete	Event	Points	Rank	Points	Rank
Natascha Hiltrop	R8 – 50 metre rifle 3 positions SH1	1160	6 Q	456.5	1st place, gold medalist(s)

Mixed

Athlete	Event	Qualification		Final	
Athlete	Event	Points	Rank	Points	Rank
Natascha Hiltrop	R3 – 10 m air rifle prone SH1	633.6	9	Did not advance	
Tjark Liestmann	R3 – 10 m air rifle prone SH1	632.5	13	Did not advance	
Moritz Möbius	R5 – 10 m rifle prone SH2	628.9	31	Did not advance	
Natascha Hiltrop	R6 – 50 m rifle prone SH1	626.3	2 Q	250.2 PR	1st place, gold medalist(s)
Cliff Junker	R6 – 50 m rifle prone SH1	608.1	34	Did not advance	
Moritz Möbius	R9 – 50 m rifle prone SH2	619.9	14	Did not advance	
Tobias Meyer	P4 – 50 m pistol SH1	530	13	Did not advance	

== Sitting volleyball ==
Germany men's national sitting volleyball team has qualified to compete by being the highest-ranked non-qualified team at the 2023 Sitting Volleyball World Cup.

Squad	Event	Group stage				Semifinal	Final	Rank
Squad	Event	Opposition Result	Opposition Result	Opposition Result	Rank	Opposition Result	Opposition Result	Rank
Germany men's	Men's tournament	Brazil; W 3–0	Ukraine; W 3–1	Iran; L 0–3	2 Q	Bosnia and Herzegovina; L 0–3	Egypt; L 2–3	4

== Swimming ==
Germany secured six quotas at the 2023 World Para Swimming Championships after finishing in the top two places in Paralympic class disciplines.

Men

Athlete	Event	Heats		Final	
Athlete	Event	Result	Rank	Result	Rank
Malte Braunschweig	50 m freestyle S9	26.56	13	Did not advance	
Malte Braunschweig	100 m butterfly S9	1:02.02	8 Q	1:01.26	6
Taliso Engel	50 m freestyle S13	24.72	11	Did not advance	
Taliso Engel	100 m breaststroke SB13	1:01.84 WR	1 Q	1:01.90	1st place, gold medalist(s)
Taliso Engel	200 m individual medley SM13	DQ			
Philip Hebmüller	100 m backstroke S13	1:05.88	13	Did not advance	
Philip Hebmüller	100 m breaststroke SB13	1:11.15	10	Did not advance	
Philip Hebmüller	100 m butterfly S13	1:01.48	12	Did not advance	
Philip Hebmüller	200 m individual medley SM13	2:20.25	9	Did not advance	
Josia Topf	50 m freestyle S3	49.11	5 Q	45.61	3rd place, bronze medalist(s)
Josia Topf	200 m freestyle S3	3:51.11	6 Q	3:41.04	5
Josia Topf	50 m backstroke S3	49.14	3 Q	47.06	2nd place, silver medalist(s)
Josia Topf	150 m individual medley SM3	3:11.99	2 Q	3:00.16	1st place, gold medalist(s)
Maurice Wetekam	100 m breaststroke SB9	1:07.79	2 Q	1:07.04	3rd place, bronze medalist(s)
Maurice Wetekam	200 m individual medley SM9	2:21.71	4 Q	2:20.60	6

Women

Athlete	Event	Heats		Final	
Athlete	Event	Result	Rank	Result	Rank
Gina Böttcher	100 m freestyle S5	1:33.28	11	Did not advance	
Gina Böttcher	50 m backstroke S4	—N/a		51.40	2nd place, silver medalist(s)
Gina Böttcher	50 m breaststroke SB3	1:12.89	11	Did not advance	
Gina Böttcher	150 m individual medley SM4	2:58.49	3 Q	2:57.44	4
Johanna Döhler	400 m freestyle S13	5:10.84	9	Did not advance	
Johanna Döhler	100 m breaststroke SB13	1:30.47	10	Did not advance	
Johanna Döhler	200 m individual medley SM13	2:51.33	12	Did not advance	
Elena Krawzow	50 m freestyle S13	28.18	7 Q	27.98	6
Elena Krawzow	100 m breaststroke SB12	1:13.19 PR	1 Q	1:12.54 WR	1st place, gold medalist(s)
Mira Jeanne Maack	400 m freestyle S8	5:19.92	9	Did not advance	
Mira Jeanne Maack	100 m backstroke S8	1:19.69	3 Q	1:18.36	3rd place, bronze medalist(s)
Mira Jeanne Maack	200 m individual medley SM8	3:05.39	12	Did not advance	
Tanja Scholz	50 m freestyle S4	40.99	3 Q	40.75	2nd place, silver medalist(s)
Tanja Scholz	100 m freestyle S5	1:25.78 PR	5 Q	1:27.07	6
Tanja Scholz	200 m freestyle S5	3:08.53 PR	8 Q	3:10.27	8
Tanja Scholz	150 m individual medley SM4	2:55.89	2 Q	2:51.31 PR	1st place, gold medalist(s)
Verena Schott	50 m freestyle S6	38.92	12	Did not advance	
Verena Schott	100 m backstroke S6	1:31.38	7 Q	1:31.71	7
Verena Schott	100 m breaststroke SB5	1:53.87	6 Q	1:49.35	5
Verena Schott	50 m butterfly S6	41.07	10	Did not advance	
Verena Schott	200 m individual medley SM6	3:21.73	7 Q	3:15.11	7
Naomi Maike Schwarz	50 m freestyle S13	28.81	14	Did not advance	
Naomi Maike Schwarz	100 m freestyle S12	1:02.99	5 Q	1:02.73	7
Naomi Maike Schwarz	100 m backstroke S12	1:16.97	8 Q	1:15.08	8

== Table tennis ==
Germany entered eight athletes for the Paralympic games. Thomas Schmidberger and Valentin Baus qualified for the games by virtue of the gold medal results in their respective class, through the 2023 European Para Championships held in Sheffield, Great Britain; meanwhile the other six athletes qualified for the games through the allocations of ITTF final world ranking.

Men

Athlete	Event	Round of 32	Round of 16	Quarterfinals	Semifinals	Final / BM	
Athlete	Event	Opposition Result	Opposition Result	Opposition Result	Opposition Result	Opposition Result	Rank
Thomas Schmidberger	Individual C3	Bye	Petruniv (UKR); W 3–1	Merrien (FRA); W 3–0	Glinbancheun (THA); W 3–0	Feng (CHN); L 0–3	2nd place, silver medalist(s)
Thomas Brüchle	Individual C3	Bye	Rodríguez (ESP); W 3–0	Feng (CHN); L 1–3	Did not advance		
Valentin Baus	Individual C5	—N/a	Bye	Öztürk (TUR); L 2–3	Did not advance		
Thomas Rau	Individual C6	—N/a	Chen (CHN); W 3–0	Rosenmeier (DEN); L 2–3	Did not advance		
Björn Schnake	Individual C7	—N/a	Liao (CHN); W 3–0	Bayley (GBR); L 1–3	Did not advance		
Valentin Baus; Thomas Schmidberger	Doubles MD8	—N/a	Nacházel / Svatoš (CZE); W 3–0	Liu / Zhai (CHN); W 3–2	Öztürk / Turan (TUR); W 3–2	Cao / Feng (CHN); L 0–3	2nd place, silver medalist(s)
Thomas Rau; Björn Schnake	Doubles MD14	—N/a	Bayley / Perry (GBR); L 0–3	Did not advance			

Women

Athlete	Event	Round of 16	Quarterfinals	Semifinals	Final / BM	
Athlete	Event	Opposition Result	Opposition Result	Opposition Result	Opposition Result	Rank
Jana Spegel	Individual C1–2	Soliman (EGY); W 3–0	Seo (KOR); L 0–3	Did not advance		
Sandra Mikolaschek	Individual C4	Bye	Vautier (FRA); W 3–0	Gu (CHN); W 3–1	Perić-Ranković (SRB); W 3–1	1st place, gold medalist(s)
Stephanie Grebe	Individual C6	Bye	Alieva (NPA); L 0–3	Did not advance		
Juliane Wolf	Individual C8	Bye	Arlóy (HUN); W 3–1	Dahlen (NOR); L 0–3	Did not advance	3rd place, bronze medalist(s)
Sandra Mikolaschek; Jana Spegel	Doubles WD10	Kang / Lee (KOR); L 2–3	Did not advance			
Stephanie Grebe; Juliane Wolf	Doubles WD14	—N/a	Caillaud / Hautiere (FRA); W 3–1	Dahlen / Tveiten (NOR); W 3–2	Huang / Jin (CHN); L 1–3	2nd place, silver medalist(s)

Mixed

Athlete	Event	Round of 32	Round of 16	Quarterfinals	Semifinals	Final / BM	
Athlete	Event	Opposition Result	Opposition Result	Opposition Result	Opposition Result	Opposition Result	Rank
Valentin Baus; Jana Spegel	Doubles XD7	Bye	Kim / Lee (KOR); L 1–3	Did not advance			
Thomas Brüchle; Sandra Mikolaschek	Doubles XD7	Bye	Matthews / Shackleton (GBR); W 3–0	Glinbancheun / Jaion (THA); L 2–3	Did not advance		
Thomas Rau; Juliane Wolf	Doubles XD17	Zohil / Lučić (CRO); L 0–3	Did not advance				
Björn Schnake; Stephanie Grebe	Doubles XD17	Montanus / van Zon (NED); L 0–3	Did not advance				

== Wheelchair basketball ==
Germany men and Germany women have qualified to compete by virtue of their top four results, respectively at the 2024 IWBF Men's Repechage in Antibes, France; and 2024 IWBF Women's Repechage in Osaka, Japan.

=== Summary ===
Squad	Event	Group stage				Quarterfinal	Semifinal	Final	Rank
Squad	Event	Opposition Result	Opposition Result	Opposition Result	Rank	Opposition Result	Opposition Result	Opposition Result	Rank
Germany men's	Men's tournament	Great Britain; L 55–76	France; W 72–64	Canada; L 52–68	3	Spain; W 57–49	Great Britain; L 43–71	Canada; W 75–62	3rd place, bronze medalist(s)
Germany women's	Women's tournament	United States; L 44–73	Japan; W 67–55	Netherlands; L 48–68	3	Canada; L 53–71	Spain; W 51–45	Great Britain; L 39–48	6

=== Men's tournament ===
Roster

The following is the Germany roster in the men's wheelchair basketball tournament of the 2024 Summer Paralympics

Germany men's national wheelchair basketball team - 2024 Summer Paralympics roster
Players
Coaches

No.	Name	Age – Date of birth	Pts.
5	Nico Dreimuller	26 – 10 December 1997	2.0
6	Matthias Guntner	25 – 10 November 1998	4.5
8	Tobias Hell	24 – 17 May 2000	1.0
9	Lukas Glossner	24 – 25 March 2000	1.0
10	Jan Haller	35 – 1 October 1988	2.0
11	Jan Sadler	31 – 9 July 1993	3.0
12	Jens-Eike Albrecht	33 – 2 June 1991	3.0
13	Thomas Boehme	33 – 24 June 1991	3.0
14	Aliaksandr Halouski	37 – 30 April 1987	4.5
15	Alexander Budde	24 – 20 April 2000	3.5
16	Thomas Reier	24 – 25 June 2000	4.5
18	Julian Lammering	20 – 28 January 2004	3.5

Head coach

Michael Engel

Assistant coach(es)

Martin Kluck

Legend

- Age - describes age on 29 August 2024

=== Women's tournament ===
Roster

The following is the Germany roster in the women's wheelchair basketball tournament of the 2024 Summer Paralympics.

Germany women's national wheelchair basketball team - 2024 Summer Paralympics roster
Players
Coaches

No.	Name	Age – Date of birth	Pts.
4	Mareike Miller	34 – 3 August 1990	4.5
5	Svenja Erni	21 – 9 July 2003	3.5
6	Catharina Weiss	24 – 2 June 2000	1.0
7	Anne Patzwald	35 – 2 July 1989	1.0
8	Vanessa Erskine	30 – 12 July 1994	1.0
9	Amanda Fanariotis	32 – 2 November 1991	4.5
10	Lisa Bergenthal	24 – 30 November 1999	3.5
11	Maya Lindholm	33 – 20 December 1990	2.5
12	Nathalie Passiwan	34 – 4 August 1990	4.5
13	Svenja Mayer	33 – 21 May 1991	2.5
14	Lilly Sellak	21 – 23 November 2002	3.5
15	Marie Kier	24 – 18 December 1999	1.0

Head coach

Dirk Passiwan

Assistant coach(es)

Ralf Neumann

Legend

- Age - describes age on 29 August 2024

== Wheelchair fencing ==
Maurice Schmidt has qualified to compete.

Athlete	Event	Round of 32	Round of 16	Quarterfinals	Semifinals	Repechage 1	Repechage 2	Repechage 3	Repechage 4	Final / BM	
Athlete	Event	Opposition Result	Opposition Result	Opposition Result	Opposition Result	Opposition Result	Opposition Result	Opposition Result	Opposition Result	Opposition Result	Rank
Maurice Schmidt	Men's épée A	Bye	Manko (UKR); L 7–15	Did not advance		Pender (POL); W 15–13	Dei Rossi (ITA); L 11–15	Did not advance			
Maurice Schmidt	Men's sabre A	—N/a	Schoonover (USA); W 15–3	Osváth (HUN); W 15–10	Tian (CHN); W 15–12	—N/a				Gilliver (GBR); W 15–8	1st place, gold medalist(s)

== Wheelchair rugby ==
Germany has qualified to compete at the Paralympic games, by virtue of their top three highest ranked team results, at the 2024 Paralympic Qualification Tournament in Wellington, New Zealand.

Standings

Squad	Group stage				Semifinal	Final	Rank
Squad	Opposition Result	Opposition Result	Opposition Result	Rank	Opposition Result	Opposition Result	Rank
Germany national team	Japan; L 44–55	Canada; L 47–54	United States; L 47–57	4	France; L 48–54	Denmark; L 49–56	8

== Wheelchair tennis ==
Katharina Krüger has qualified to compete.

Athlete	Event	Round of 32	Round of 16	Quarterfinals	Semifinals	Final / BM	
Athlete	Event	Opposition Result	Opposition Result	Opposition Result	Opposition Result	Opposition Result	Rank
Katharina Krüger	Women's singles	de Groot (NED); L 1–6, 0–6	Did not advance				

== See also ==
- Germany at the 2024 Summer Olympics
- Germany at the Paralympics
