= Netherlands at the 2024 Summer Paralympics =

- Flag of the Netherlands
- IPC code: NED
- NPC: NOC*NSF
- Website: paralympisch.nl

in Paris, France August 28, 2024 – September 8, 2024
- Competitors: 84 in 9 sports
- Flag bearers (opening): Daniel Abraham; Carina de Rooij
- Flag bearers (closing): Tristan Bangma; Diede de Groot
- Medals Ranked 4th: Gold 27 Silver 17 Bronze 12 Total 56

Summer Paralympics appearances (overview)
- 1960; 1964; 1968; 1972; 1976; 1980; 1984; 1988; 1992; 1996; 2000; 2004; 2008; 2012; 2016; 2020; 2024

The Netherlands competed at the 2024 Summer Paralympics in Paris, France, from 28 August to 8 September.

== Medalists ==
The following Dutch competitors won medals at the games. In the discipline sections below, the medalists' names are bolded.

Medal	Name	Sport	Event	Date
Gold	Caroline Groot	Cycling	Women's time trial C4–5	29 August
Gold	Tristan Bangma; Guide: Patrick Bos	Cycling	Men's individual pursuit B	29 August
Gold	Liesette Bruinsma	Swimming	Women's 400 metre freestyle S11	30 August
Gold	Chantalle Zijderveld	Swimming	Women's 100 m breaststroke SB9	30 August
Gold	Fleur Jong	Athletics	Women's long jump T64	31 August
Gold	Joel de Jong	Athletics	Men's long jump T63	31 August
Gold	Jetze Plat	Paratriathlon	Men's PTWC	2 september
Gold	Rogier Dorsman	Swimming	Men's 200 m individual medley SM11	3 September
Gold	Kimberly Alkemade	Athletics	Women's 200 m T64	3 September
Gold	Marieke van Soest	Cycling	Women's road time trial T1-2	4 September
Gold	Demi Haerkens	Equestrian	Individual championship test grade IV	4 September
Gold	Tristan Bangma; Guide: Patrick Bos	Cycling	Men's road time trial B	4 September
Gold	Daniel Abraham	Cycling	Men's road time trial C5	4 September
Gold	Mitch Valize	Cycling	Men's road time trial H5	4 September
Gold	Jetze Plat	Cycling	Men's road time trial H4	4 September
Gold	Sam Schröder; Niels Vink	Wheelchair tennis	Quad doubles	4 September
Gold	Mitch Valize	Cycling	Men's road race H5	5 September
Gold	Jetze Plat	Cycling	Men's road race H4	5 September
Gold	Niels Vink	Wheelchair tennis	Quad singles	5 September
Gold	Kelly van Zon	Table tennis	Women's individual class 7	5 September
Gold	Rogier Dorsman	Swimming	Men's 100 m breaststroke SB11	5 September
Gold	Tristan Bangma; Guide: Patrick Bos	Cycling	Men's road race B	6 September
Gold	Olivier van de Voort	Swimming	Men's 100 m breaststroke SB11	6 September
Gold	Fleur Jong	Athletics	Women's 100 m T64	6 September
Gold	Demi Haerkens	Equestrian	Individual freestyle test grade IV	7 September
Gold	Lara Baars	Athletics	Women's Shot put F40	7 September
Gold	Women's wheelchair basketball team: Ilse Arts; Sylvana van Hees; Lindsay Frelink; Jitske Visser; Julia van der Sprong; Bo Kramer; Xena Wimmenhoeve; Cher Korver; Saskia Pronk; Carina de Rooij; Mariska Beijer; Ylonne Post	Wheelchair basketball	Women's tournament	8 September 2024
Silver	Rogier Dorsman	Swimming	Men's 400 m freestyle S11	30 August
Silver	Marlene van Gansewinkel	Athletics	Women's long jump T64	31 August
Silver	Florianne Bultje; Thijs van Hofweegen; Olivier van de Voort; Chantalle Zijderveld	Swimming	Mixed 4 x 100 m medley 34pts	2 September
Silver	Rixt van der Horst	Equestrian	Individual championship test grade III	3 September
Silver	Marlene van Gansewinkel	Athletics	Women's 200 m T64	3 September
Silver	Chantal Haenen	Cycling	Women's road time trial H4-5	4 September
Silver	Sanne Voets	Equestrian	Individual championship test grade IV	4 September
Silver	Jennette Jansen	Cycling	Women's road race H1-4	4 September
Silver	Diede de Groot; Aniek van Koot	Wheelchair tennis	Women's doubles	5 September
Silver	Sam Schröder	Wheelchair tennis	Quad singles	5 September
Silver	Diede de Groot	Wheelchair tennis	Women's singles	6 September
Silver	Vincent ter Schure; Guide: Timo Fransen	Cycling	Men's road race B	6 September
Silver	Demi Haerkens; Sanne Voets; Rixt van der Horst	Equestrian	Team event	6 September
Silver	Kimberly Alkemade	Athletics	Women's 100 m T64	6 September
Silver	Rixt van der Horst	Equestrian	Individual freestyle test grade III	7 September
Silver	Liesette Bruinsma	Swimming	Women's 100 metre freestyle S11	7 September
Silver	Levi Vloet	Athletics	Men's 400 m T64	7 September
Bronze	Lisa Kruger	Swimming	Women's 100 m breaststroke SB9	30 August
Bronze	Noah Mbuyamba	Athletics	Men's long jump T63	31 August
Bronze	Geert Schipper	Paratriathlon	Men's PTWC	2 september
Bronze	Nico van der Burgt	Paratriathlon	Men's PTS3	2 september
Bronze	Vincent ter Schure; Guide: Timo Fransen	Cycling	Men's road time trial B	4 September
Bronze	Jean Paul Montanus	Table tennis	Men's individual class 7	6 September
Bronze	Martin van de Pol	Cycling	Men's road race C4-5	6 September
Bronze	Aniek van Koot	Wheelchair tennis	Women's singles	6 September
Bronze	Marlene van Gansewinkel	Athletics	Women's 100 m T64	6 September
Bronze	Olivier Hendriks	Athletics	Women's 400 m T64	6 September
Bronze	Marieke van Soest	Cycling	Women's road race T1-2	7 September
Bronze	Lisa Kruger	Swimming	Women's 200 m individual medley SM10	7 September

Medals by sport
Sport	1st place, gold medalist(s)	2nd place, silver medalist(s)	3rd place, bronze medalist(s)	Total
Cycling	10	3	3	**16**
Athletics	5	4	3	**12**
Swimming	5	3	2	**10**
Triathlon	1	0	2	**3**
Wheelchair tennis	2	3	1	**6**
Equestrian	2	4	0	**6**
Table tennis	1	0	1	**2**
Wheelchair basketball	1	0	0	**1**
Total	27	17	12	56

Medals by day
Day	Date	1st place, gold medalist(s)	2nd place, silver medalist(s)	3rd place, bronze medalist(s)	Total
1	29 August	2	0	0	**2**
2	30 August	2	1	1	**4**
3	31 August	2	1	1	**4**
4	1 September	0	0	0	**0**
5	2 September	1	1	2	**4**
6	3 September	2	2	0	**4**
7	4 September	7	2	1	**10**
8	5 September	5	3	0	**8**
9	6 September	3	4	5	**12**
10	7 September	2	3	2	**7**
11	8 September	1	0	0	**1**
Total		27	17	12	56

Medals by gender
Gender	1st place, gold medalist(s)	2nd place, silver medalist(s)	3rd place, bronze medalist(s)	Total	Percentage
Female	10	8	5	**23**	41.1%
Male	13	3	7	**23**	41.1%
Open	4	5	0	**9**	16.1%
Mixed	0	1	0	**1**	1.8%
Total	27	17	12	56	100%

Multiple gold medalists
Name	Sport	1st place, gold medalist(s)	2nd place, silver medalist(s)	3rd place, bronze medalist(s)	Total
Jetze Plat	Cycling; Triathlon	3	0	0	**3**
Tristan Bangma	Cycling	3	0	0	**3**
Rogier Dorsman	Swimming	2	1	0	**3**
Demi Haerkens	Equestrian	2	1	0	**3**
Niels Vink	Wheelchair tennis	2	0	0	**2**
Mitch Valize	Cycling	2	0	0	**2**
Fleur Jong	Athletics	2	0	0	**2**

== Competitors ==
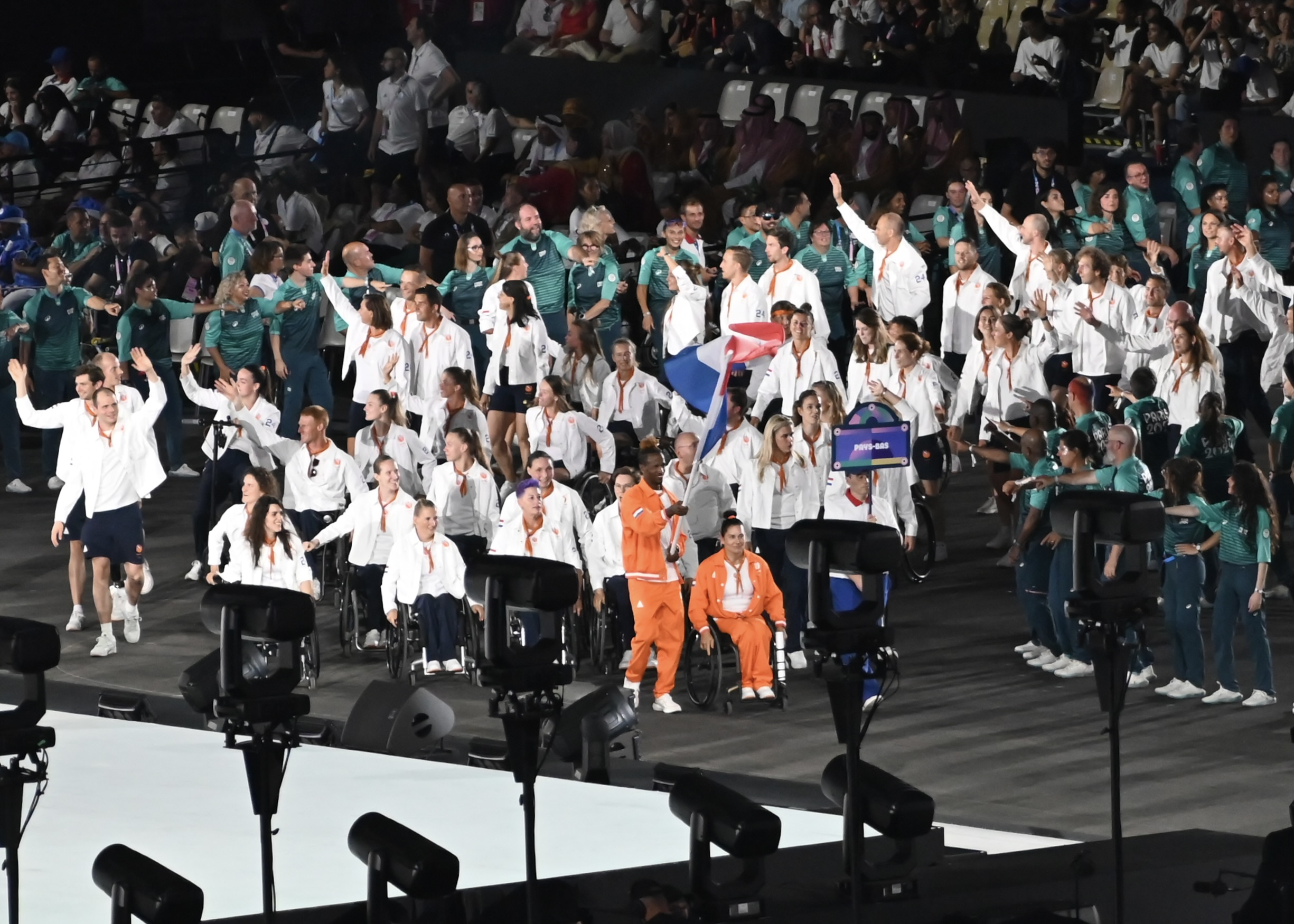
The Dutch team at the 2024 Summer Paralympics opening ceremony

The following is the list of number of competitors in the Games.

Sport	Men	Women	Total
Athletics	5	9	14
Boccia	2	1	3
Cycling	8	4	12
Equestrian	0	4	4
Judo	1	0	1
Rowing	1	1	2
Swimming	6	4	10
Triathlon	4	0	4
Table tennis	1	1	2
Wheelchair basketball	12	12	24
Wheelchair tennis	6	4	10
Total	44 ^{[a]}	40	84 ^{[b]}

^{a} Jetze Plat competed in triathlon, cycling and athletics (hence the totals appear to be two short).

== Athletics ==
Dutch track and field athletes achieved quota places for the following events based on their results at the 2023 World Championships, 2024 World Championships, or through high performance allocation, as long as they meet the minimum entry standard (MES).

Key

- Note–Ranks given for track events are within the athlete's heat only
- Q = Qualified for the next round
- q = Qualified for the next round as a fastest loser or, in field events, by position without achieving the qualifying target
- DQ = Disqualified
- PR = Paralympic Record
- AR = Area (or continental) Record
- NR = National Record
- SB = Season's Best
- N/A = Round not applicable for the event
- Bye = Athlete not required to compete in round

Track & road events
Men

Athlete	Event	Heat		Final	
Athlete	Event	Result	Rank	Result	Rank
Joel de Jong	100 m T63	12.09 SB	2 Q	12.20	6
Olivier Hendriks	100 m T64	11.12	4 q	11.15	7
Olivier Hendriks	400 m T62	—N/a		46.91 PB	3rd place, bronze medalist(s)
Levi Vloet	200 m T64	23.03	2 Q	22.47	2nd place, silver medalist(s)
Jetze Plat	Marathon T54	—N/a		1:39:47	9

Women

Athlete	Event	Heat		Final	
Athlete	Event	Result	Rank	Result	Rank
Nienke Timmer	100 m T35	—N/a		15.69	7
Cheyenne Bouthoorn	100 m T36	14.90	3 Q	14.80	6
Cheyenne Bouthoorn	200 m T36	31.43	5	Did not advance	
Zara Temmink	100 m T13	12.89	6	Did not advance	
Kimberly Alkemade	100 m T64	12.61	1 Q	12.70	2nd place, silver medalist(s)
Marlene van Gansewinkel	100 m T64	12.68	2 Q	12.72	3rd place, bronze medalist(s)
Fleur Jong	100 m T64	12.48 PR	1 Q	12.54	1st place, gold medalist(s)
Kimberly Alkemade	200 m T64	26.31	1 Q	25.42 PB	1st place, gold medalist(s)
Marlene van Gansewinkel	200 m T64	26.36	1 Q	26.14	2nd place, silver medalist(s)

Field events
Men

Athlete	Event	Final	
Athlete	Event	Distance	Position
Joel de Jong	Long jump T63	7.68 WR	1st place, gold medalist(s)
Noah Mbuyamba	Long jump T63	7.01 PB	3rd place, bronze medalist(s)

Athlete	Event	Final	
Athlete	Event	Distance	Position
Marlene van Gansewinkel	Long jump T64	5.87 PB	2nd place, silver medalist(s)
Kiki Hendriks	Long jump T64	5.35	4
Fleur Jong	Long jump T64	6.53 PR	1st place, gold medalist(s)
Noëlle Roorda	Javelin throw F46	40.58	4
Lara Baars	Shot put F40	9.10 PR	1st place, gold medalist(s)

== Boccia ==
Netherlands entered three athletes into the Paralympics games, by virtue of their result as the highest rank nation's in the BC1/BC2 team event, at the 2023 European Para Championships in Rotterdam.

Athlete	Event	Pool matches				Quarterfinals	Semifinals	Final / BM	
Athlete	Event	Opposition Score	Opposition Score	Opposition Score	Rank	Opposition Score	Opposition Score	Opposition Score	Rank
Daniel Perez	Men's individual BC1	Oliveira (BRA); W 6-5	Smith (GBR); L 1-4	—N/a	2 Q	Syafa (INA); L 0–10	Did not advance		
Marco Dekker	Men's individual BC2	Levi (ISR); L 2–7	Santos (BRA); L 2-7	Tayahi (TUN); W 0-8	3	Did not advance			
Chantal van Engelen	Women's individual BC2	Nagy (HUN); W 4-3	Zayana (INA); L 1-9	—N/a	2 Q	Jeong (KOR); L 1-4	Did not advance		
Marco Dekker; Chantal van Engelen; Daniel Perez	Mixed team BC1–BC2	France (FRA); L 2-8	Indonesia (INA); L 3-9	—N/a	3	Did not advance			

== Cycling ==
The Netherlands entered two para-cyclists (one in each gender) after finished the top eligible nation's at the 2022 UCI Nation's ranking allocation ranking.

=== Road ===
Men

Athlete	Event	Result	Rank
Tristan Bangma; Pilot: Patrick Bos	Time trial B	34:11.02	1st place, gold medalist(s)
Vincent ter Schure; Pilot: Timo Fransen	Time trial B	34:53.92	2nd place, silver medalist(s)
Daniel Abraham	Time trial C5	35:51.79	1st place, gold medalist(s)
Martin van de Pol	Time trial C5	37:45.98	8
Mark Mekenkamp	Time trial H3	46:51.75	5
Jetze Plat	Time trial H4	41:28.51	1st place, gold medalist(s)
Mitch Valize	Time trial H4	41:01.59	1st place, gold medalist(s)
Tim de Vries	Time trial H4	45:13.72	5

Women

Athlete	Event	Result	Rank
Chantal Haenen	Time trial H4-5	23:51.44	2nd place, silver medalist(s)
Jennette Jansen	Time trial H4-5	25:46.87	4
Marieke van Soest	Time trial T1-2	25:47.78	1st place, gold medalist(s)

=== Track ===
Men

Athlete	Event	Heats		Final	
Athlete	Event	Result	Rank	Result	Rank
Tristan Bangma; Pilot: Patrick Bos	Individual pursuit B	3:55.396 WR	1 QG	Bate (Pilot: Latham) (GBR); W	1st place, gold medalist(s)
Vincent ter Schure; Pilot: Timo Fransen	Individual pursuit B	4:04.969	4 QB	Bernard (Pilot: Plebani) (ITA); L	4
Daniel Abraham	Individual pursuit C5	4:24.280	8	Did not advance	
Martin van de Pol	Individual pursuit C5	4:22.506	6	Did not advance	

Women

Athlete	Event	Heats		Final	
Athlete	Event	Result	Rank	Result	Rank
Caroline Groot	Time trial C4-5	35.39 WR	1 Q	35.566	1st place, gold medalist(s)
Caroline Groot	Individual pursuit C5	4:05.470	8	Did not advance	

== Equestrian ==
The Netherlands entered a full squad of four para-equestrians into the Paralympic equestrian competition by finishing the top seven nation's at the 2022 FEI World Championships in Herning, Denmark.

Individual

Athlete	Horse	Event	Total	
Athlete	Horse	Event	Score	Rank
Sanne Voets	Demantur	Individual championship test grade IV	76.528	2nd place, silver medalist(s)
Sanne Voets	Demantur	Individual freestyle test grade IV	79.880	4
Demi Haerkens	Daula	Individual championship test grade IV	78.722	1st place, gold medalist(s)
Demi Haerkens	Daula	Individual freestyle test grade IV	83.840	1st place, gold medalist(s)
Annemarieke Nobel	Doo Schufro	Individual championship test grade I	72.792	4
Annemarieke Nobel	Doo Schufro	Individual freestyle test grade I	77.614	4
Rixt van der Horst	Royal Fono	Individual championship test grade III	76.433	2nd place, silver medalist(s)
Rixt van der Horst	Royal Fono	Individual freestyle test grade III	83.007	2nd place, silver medalist(s)

Team

Athlete	Horse	Event	Individual score	Total	
Athlete	Horse	Event	TT	Score	Rank
Sanne Voets GIV	See above	Team event	75.567	232.850	2nd place, silver medalist(s)
Demi Haerkens GIII	See above	Team event	78.216	232.850	2nd place, silver medalist(s)
Rixt van der Horst GIII	See above	Team event	78.067	232.850	2nd place, silver medalist(s)

== Judo ==
Athlete	Class	Event	Quarterfinals	Semifinals	Repechage Round	Final/ Bronze medal contest	
Athlete	Class	Event	Opposition Result	Opposition Result	Opposition Result	Opposition Result	Rank
Daniël Knegt	J1	+90 kg	Basoc (MDA); L 0-10	Did not advance	Zakiyev (AZE); L 0-10	Did not advance	

== Triathlon ==
Jetze Plat, Geert Schipper, Nico van der Burgt and Maurits Morsink have all qualified to compete.

Athlete	Event	Swim	Trans 1	Bike	Trans 2	Run	Total Time	Rank
Jetze Plat	Men's PTWC	13:19	1:14	31:19	0:40	11:44	58:16	1st place, gold medalist(s)
Geert Schipper	Men's PTWC	14:21	1:06	32:42	0:42	11:29	1:00:20	3rd place, bronze medalist(s)
Nico van der Burgt	Men's PTS3	11:26	1:29	34:00	0:58	21:31	1:09:24	3rd place, bronze medalist(s)
Maurits Morsink	Men's PTS2	16:40	1:31	32:08	0:40	17:28	1:08:27	4

== Rowing ==
Netherlands qualified one boat in the mixed double sculls for the games at the 2023 World Rowing Championships in Belgrade, Serbia and securing one of the eight available place.

Athlete	Event	Heats		Repechage		Final	
Athlete	Event	Time	Rank	Time	Rank	Time	Rank
Esther van der Loos; Corné de Koning	Mixed double sculls	8:19.21	4 R	8:33.73	3 FB	8:42.73	7

Qualification Legend: FA=Final A (medal); FB=Final B (non-medal); R=Repechage

== Swimming ==
Netherlands secured ten quotas at the 2023 World Para Swimming Championships after finishing in the top two places in Paralympic class disciplines and achieving qualification times.

Men

Athlete	Event	Heats		Final	
Athlete	Event	Result	Rank	Result	Rank
Rogier Dorsman	50 m freestyle S11	27.18	9	Did not advance	
Rogier Dorsman	400 m freestyle S11	—N/a		4:31.34	2nd place, silver medalist(s)
Rogier Dorsman	100 m backstroke S11	1:08.70	3 Q	1:07.87	4
Rogier Dorsman	100 m butterfly S11	1:06.95	6 Q	1:04.29	5
Rogier Dorsman	100 m breaststroke SB11	1:10.92	1 Q	1:11.07	1st place, gold medalist(s)
Rogier Dorsman	200 m individual medley SM11	—N/a		2:18.36 PR	1st place, gold medalist(s)
Marc Evers	100 m backstroke S14	1:01.02	7	1:00.79	8
Bas Takken	100 m backstroke S10	1:03.04	3 Q	1:01.97	6
Bas Takken	200 m individual medley SM10	2:18.11	3 Q	2:18.12	7
Thijs van Hofweegen	100 m freestyle S6	1:07.04	6 Q	1:06.67	6
Thijs van Hofweegen	100 m backstroke S6	1:19.19	6 Q	1:17.44	5
Thomas van Wanrooij	100 m backstroke S13	1:00.41	4 Q	1:00.55	4
Thomas van Wanrooij	100 m breaststroke SB13	1:07.87	7 Q	1:07.64	7
Thomas van Wanrooij	200 m individual medley SM13	2:16.54	5 Q	2:15.38	5
Olivier van de Voort	100 m backstroke S14	58.34	1 Q	59.04	1st place, gold medalist(s)

Women

Athlete	Event	Heat		Final	
Athlete	Event	Result	Rank	Result	Rank
Liesette Bruinsma	50 m freestyle S11	30.24	2 Q	30.66	6
Liesette Bruinsma	100 m freestyle S11	1:05.23 PR	1 Q	1:05.95	2nd place, silver medalist(s)
Liesette Bruinsma	400m freestyle S11	5:06.82	3 Q	5:00.42	1st place, gold medalist(s)
Liesette Bruinsma	200 m individual medley SM11	2:45.06	1 Q	2:43.13	4
Florianne Bultje	100 m butterfly S9	1:08.84	3 Q	1:08.20	4
Lisa Kruger	100 m breaststroke SB9	1:17.53	3 Q	1:17.14	3rd place, bronze medalist(s)
Lisa Kruger	100 m freestyle S10	1:01.61	4 Q	1:01.12	5
Lisa Kruger	100 m butterfly S10	1:11.50	11	Did not advance	
Lisa Kruger	100 m backstroke S10	1:10.79	6 Q	1:09.46	1
Lisa Kruger	200 m individual medley SM10	2:34.81	2 Q	2:29.91	3rd place, bronze medalist(s)
Chantalle Zijderveld	100 m breaststroke SB9	1:14.85	1 Q	1:13.74	1st place, gold medalist(s)

Mixed

Athlete	Event	Heat		Final	
Athlete	Event	Result	Rank	Result	Rank
Florianne Bultje; Thijs van Hofweegen; Olivier van de Voort; Chantalle Zijderveld	4 x 100 m medley 34pts	4:28.77	1 Q	4:28.07	2nd place, silver medalist(s)

== Table tennis ==
Netherlands entered two athletes for the Paralympic games. All of them qualified for the games through the allocations of the final ITTF world ranking.

Athlete	Event	Round of 32	Round of 16	Quarterfinals	Semifinals	Final	
Athlete	Event	Opposition Result	Opposition Result	Opposition Result	Opposition Result	Opposition Result	Rank
Jean-Paul Montanus	Men's individual C7	—N/a	Despineux (BEL); W 3-1	Hanson (SWE); W 3-1	Bayley (GBR); L 0-3	Did not advance	3rd place, bronze medalist(s)
Kelly van Zon	Women's individual C7	—N/a	Bye	Korneliussen (NOR); W 3-0	Wang (CHN); W 3-1	Korkut (TUR); W 3-2	1st place, gold medalist(s)
Kelly van Zon; Jean-Paul Montanus	Mixed doubles XD17	Grebe / Schnake (GER); W 3-0	Mao / Zhao (CHN); L 3-2	Did not advance			

== Wheelchair basketball ==
Netherlands men and Netherlands women have qualified to compete, respectively through the 2024 IWBF Men's Repechage in Antibes, France; and 2023 European Para Championships in Rotterdam.

Summary

Squad	Group stage				Quarterfinal	Semifinal	Final	Rank
Squad	Opposition Result	Opposition Result	Opposition Result	Rank	Opposition Result	Opposition Result	Opposition Result	Rank
Netherlands men's	Australia; W 66-55	United States; L 34-60	Spain; L 53-68	3	Canada; L 67-79	5-8th place France; W 72-63	5th/6th place Australia; L 75-82	6
Netherlands women's	Japan; W 87-34	United States; W 69-56	Germany; W 68-48	1	Spain; W 61-43	Canada; W 72-61	United States; W 63–49	1st place, gold medalist(s)

=== Men's tournament ===
Roster

Netherlands men's national wheelchair basketball team - 2024 Summer Paralympics roster
Players
Coaches

No.	Name	Age – Date of birth	Pts.
0	Frank de Jong	39 – 15 March 1985	1.0
1	Robin Poggenwisch	35 – 24 July 1989	3.0
2	Mendel Op den Orth	28 – 23 January 1996	4.0
3	Anil Cegil	24 – 17 November 1999	1.5
7	Patrick de Boer	33 – 5 December 1990	3.0
11	Mattijs Bellers	32 – 6 September 1992	4.5
12	Gijs Even	29 – 22 September 1994	4.5
15	Quinten Zantinge	24 – 31 January 2000	3.0
17	Arie Twigt	24 – 20 May 2000	3.5
21	Camilo van Trijp	33 – 30 August 1990	1.0
23	Mustafa Korkmaz	36 – 18 January 1988	3.0
38	Joeri van Liere	38 – 14 April 1986	1.5

Head coach

Cees van Rootselaar

Assistant coach(es)

Anton de Rooij

Legend

- Age - describes age on 29 August 2024

Group B

Pos	Team	Pld	W	L	PF	PA	PD	Pts	Qualification
1	United States	3	3	0	202	159	+43	6	Quarter-finals
2	Spain	3	2	1	192	179	+13	5	Quarter-finals
3	Netherlands	3	1	2	153	183	−30	4	Quarter-finals
4	Australia	3	0	3	184	210	−26	3	Quarter-finals

Source: Paris 2024
Rules for classification: 1) Points; 2) Head-to-head results; 3) Points difference; 4) Points scored.

29 August 2024
21:30

Report

Australia	55–66	Netherlands
Scoring by quarter: 16–12, 14–16, 10–16, 15–22
Pts: Latham 16; Rebs: Latham 13; Asts: Norris, Knowles 5		Pts: Op den Orth 26; Rebs: Op den Orth 12; Asts: Zantinge 9

Bercy Arena, Paris
Attendance: 11.029
Referees: Sébastien Gauthier

31 August 2024
16:00

Report

Netherlands	34–60	United States
Scoring by quarter: 4–17, 15–12, 13–14, 2–17
Pts: Op den Orth 26; Rebs: Op den Orth 9 Asts: Poggenwisch 10		Pts: Bell 18; Rebs: Bell 11; Asts: Serio 8

Bercy Arena, Paris
Attendance: 12.741
Referees: Cristian Colombatti

1 September 2024
18:15

Report

Netherlands	53–68	Spain
Scoring by quarter: 18–14, 13–21, 15–14, 7–19
Pts: Bellers 22; Rebs: Bellers 11; Asts: Poggenwisch 7		Pts: Ortega 19; Rebs: A. Zarzuela 10; Asts: Ortega 7

Bercy Arena, Paris
Attendance: 12.725
Referees: Sébastien Gauthier

Quarter final

3 September 2024
16:00

Report

Canada	79–67	Netherlands
Scoring by quarter: 18–19, 26–10, 21–22, 14–16
Pts: Anderson 20; Rebs: Anderson 20; Asts: Gončin 7		Pts: Op den Orth 18; Rebs: Poggenwisch 9 Asts: Poggenwisch 12

Bercy Arena, Paris
Attendance: 11.279
Referees: Shu-Fei Hsieh

Classification 5th-8th place

5 September 2024
18:15

Report

Netherlands	72–63	France
Scoring by quarter: 20–6, 19–22, 19–19, 14–16
Pts: Op den Orth 23; Rebs: Poggenwisch 11; Asts: Poggenwisch 19		Pts: Jouenserre 21; Rebs: Carlier 10; Asts: Mehiaoui 13

Bercy Arena, Paris
Attendance: 11.470
Referees: Gustavo Mathias

5th–6th classification match

6 September 2024
19:15

Report

Netherlands	75–82	Australia
Scoring by quarter: 20–22, 18–25, 18–19, 19–16
Pts: Op den Orth 22; Rebs: Op den Orth 13; Asts: Poggenwisch 12		Pts: Knowles 21; Rebs: Latham 8 Asts: Norris 8

Bercy Arena, Paris
Attendance: 12.514
Referees: Yekta Koç

=== Women's tournament ===
Roster

The following is the Nethewrelands roster in the women's wheelchair basketball tournament of the 2024 Summer Paralympics.

Netherlands women's national wheelchair basketball team - 2024 Summer Paralympics roster
Players
Coaches

No.	Name	Age – Date of birth	Pts.
2	Ilse Arts	34 – 7 June 1990	1.5
4	Sylvana van Hees	31 – 4 April 1993	1.5
5	Lindsay Frelink	25 – 6 August 1999	2.0
6	Jitske Visser	31 – 29 October 1992	1.0
8	Julia van der Sprong	24 – 27 September 1999	3.5
9	Bo Kramer	25 – 15 September 1998	4.5
10	Xena Wimmenhoeve	24 – 14 May 2000	4.0
11	Cher Korver	48 – 11 May 1976	2.5
12	Saskia Pronk	41 – 6 August 1983	1.0
14	Carina de Rooij	44 – 10 May 1980	3.0
15	Mariska Beijer	33 – 29 June 1991	4.0
16	Ylonne Post	22 – 16 December 2001	1.0

Head coach

Gertjan van der Linden

Assistant coach(es)

Irene Sloof

Legend

- Age - describes age on 29 August 2024

Group B

Pos	Team	Pld	W	L	PF	PA	PD	Pts	Qualification
1	Netherlands	3	3	0	224	138	+86	6	Quarter-finals
2	United States	3	2	1	191	165	+26	5	Quarter-finals
3	Germany	3	1	2	159	196	−37	4	Quarter-finals
4	Japan	3	0	3	141	216	−75	3	Quarter-finals

Source: Paris 2024
Rules for classification: 1) Points; 2) Head-to-head results; 3) Points difference; 4) Points scored.

30 August 2024
10:30

Report

Netherlands	87–34	Japan
Scoring by quarter: 29–7, 22–9, 12–4, 24–14
Pts: Beijer 28; Rebs: Kramer 12; Asts: Kramer 9		Pts: Tsuchida 14; Rebs: Kitada 11; Asts: Amimoto 8

Bercy Arena, Paris
Referees: Milutin Jelenić

31 August 2024
18:15

Report

Netherlands	69–56	United States
Scoring by quarter: 15–16, 17–12, 18–12, 19–16
Pts: Beijer 34; Rebs: Beijer 12; Asts: Kramer 8		Pts: Hollermann 21; Rebs: González 10; Asts: Zurbrugg 9

Bercy Arena, Paris
Attendance: 12.741
Referees: Sebastien Gauthier

2 September 2024
21:30

Report

Germany	48–68	Netherlands
Scoring by quarter: 12–17, 7–17, 12–16, 17–18
Pts: Miller 17; Rebs: Miller 12; Asts: Miller 11		Pts: Beijer, Kramer 19; Rebs: Beijer 13; Asts: Van der Sprong 6

Bercy Arena, Paris
Attendance: 12.721
Referees: Gustavo Mathias

Quarter final

4 September 2024
18:15

Report

Netherlands	61–43	Spain
Scoring by quarter: 17-13, 11-12, 15-11, 18-7
Pts: Beijer 34; Rebs: van der Sprong 13; Asts: Kramer 5		Pts: Pérez 18; Rebs: Pérez 8 Asts: Zudaire 7

Bercy Arena, Paris
Attendance: 12,550
Referees: Fengqin Wang

Semi-final

6 September 2024
21:30

Report

Netherlands	72–61	Canada
Scoring by quarter: 16-12, 17-23, 20-14, 19-12
Pts: Kramer 25; Rebs: Beijer 12; Asts: Kramer 9		Pts: Young 29; Rebs: Dandeneau 13; Asts: Dandeneau 10

Bercy Arena, Paris
Attendance: 12.514
Referees: Shunsuke Nikaido

Final

8 September 2024
13:45

Report

Netherlands	63–49	United States
Scoring by quarter: 8–12, 23–12, 17–13, 15–12
Pts: Kramer 23; Rebs: Kramer 12; Asts: De Rooij 7		Pts: Hollermann 17; Rebs: Hollermann 8 Asts: Zurbrugg 7

Bercy Arena, Paris
Attendance: 12.629
Referees: Céline Villard

== Wheelchair tennis ==
Netherlands entered two players into the Paralympics by virtue of the gold medal results in the respective gender single events at the 2023 European Para Championships in Rotterdam.

Athlete	Event	Round of 64	Round of 32	Round of 16	Quarterfinals	Semifinals	Final / BM	
Athlete	Event	Opposition Result	Opposition Result	Opposition Result	Opposition Result	Opposition Result	Opposition Result	Rank
Tom Egberink	Men's singles	Bye	Dong (CHN); W 6-0, 6-0	Caverzaschi (ESP); W 7-6, 7-6	Oda (JPN); L 4-6, 1-6	Did not advance		
Maikel Scheffers	Men's singles	Bye	Langmann (AUT); W 6-4, 6-1	de la Puente (ESP); L 2-6, 2-6	Did not advance			
Ruben Spaargaren	Men's singles	Bye	Zhengxu (CHN); W 6-3, 6-4	Menguy (FRA); W 6-4, 6-1	Hewett (GBR); L 1-6, 4-6	Did not advance		
Maarten ter Hofte	Men's singles	Cattanéo (FRA); L 4-6, 2-6	Did not advance					
Tom Egberink; Maikel Scheffers	Men's doubles	—N/a	Bye	Bartram / Ward (GBR); W 6-2, 7-6	Caverzaschi / de la Puente (ESP); L 5-7, 6-1, [10-3]	Did not advance		
Ruben Spaargaren; Maarten ter Hofte	Men's doubles	—N/a	Bye	Casco / Fernandez (ARG); W 7-5, 6-3	Hewett / Reid (GBR); L 2-6, 1-6	Did not advance		
Jinte Bos	Women's singles	—N/a	Wang (CHN); L 1-6, 2-6	Did not advance				
Lizzy de Greef	Women's singles	—N/a	Zhu (CHN); L 1-6, 6-1, 2-6	Did not advance				
Diede de Groot	Women's singles	—N/a	Krüger (GER); W 6-1, 6-0	Zikri (ISR); W 6-0, 6-0	Luoyao (CHN); W 7-5, 6-3	Wang (CHN); W 6-2, 6-1	Kamiji (JPN); L 6-4, 3-6, 4-6	2nd place, silver medalist(s)
Aniek van Koot	Women's singles	—N/a	Buob (SUI); W 6-2, 6-3	Tanaka (JPN); W 6-0, 6-2	Li (CHN); W 6-1, 7-5	Kamiji (JPN); L 0-6, 6-4, 4-6	Wang (CHN); W 7-6, 6-1	3rd place, bronze medalist(s)
Jinte Bos; Lizzy de Greef	Women's doubles	—N/a		Breakwell / Shuker (GBR); W 6-2, 6-4	Kamiji / Tanaka (JPN); L 3-6, 4-6	Did not advance		
Diede de Groot; Aniek van Koot	Women's doubles	—N/a		Bye	Ohtani / Takamuro (JPN); W 6-4, 6-1	Li / Zhu (CHN); W 6-2, 6-2	Kamiji / Tanaka (JPN); L 6-4, 6-7, 8-10	2nd place, silver medalist(s)
Sam Schröder	Quads singles	—N/a		Bye	Pena (BRA); W 6-1, 6-2	Sasson (ISR); W 7-6, 6-4	Vink (NED); L 0-6, 1-6	2nd place, silver medalist(s)
Niels Vink	Quads singles	—N/a		Sithole (RSA); W 6-0, 6-2	Shaw (CAN); W 6-0, 6-0	Kaplan (TUR); W 6-1, 6-1	Schröder (NED); W 6-0, 6-1	1st place, gold medalist(s)
Sam Schröder; Niels Vink	Quads doubles	—N/a			Bye	Sithole / Ramphadi (RSA); W 6-1, 6-1	Lapthorne / Slade (GBR); W 6-1, 6-1	1st place, gold medalist(s)

== See also ==
- Netherlands at the 2024 Summer Olympics
- Netherlands at the Paralympics
