= Cycling at the 2024 Summer Paralympics – Women's road race T1–2 =

Women's road race T1-2 at the XVII Paralympic Games
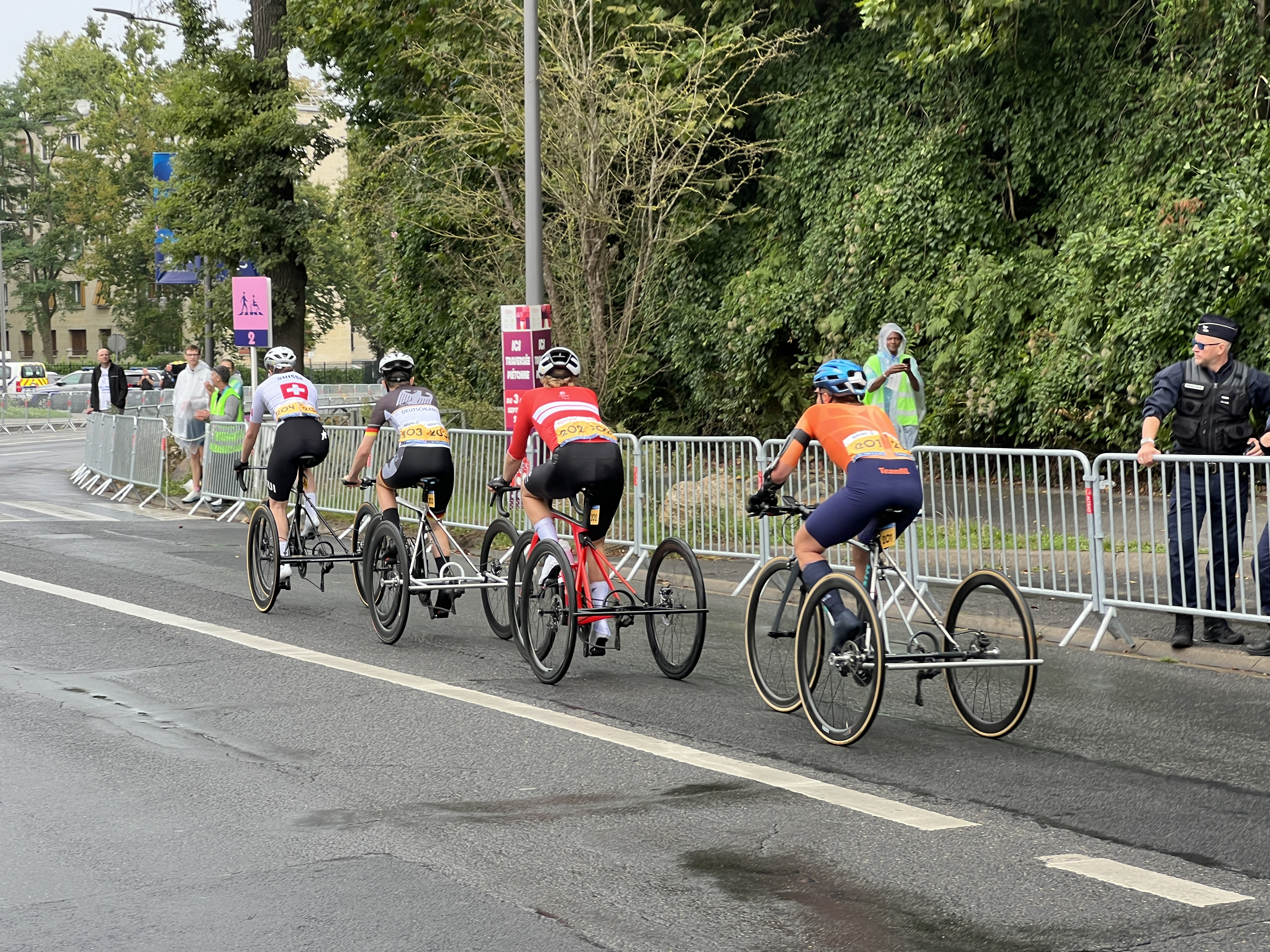
- Dates: 7 September 2024
- Competitors: 6 from 6 nations
- Winning time: 1:00:16

Medalists
1st place, gold medalist(s)		Emma Lund	Denmark
2nd place, silver medalist(s)		Celine van Till	Switzerland
3rd place, bronze medalist(s)		Marieke van Soest	Netherlands

The women's road race T1-2 cycling event at the 2024 Summer Paralympics took place on 7 September. Six riders competed in the event. The T classes are for riders with balance problems who ride racing tricycles.

== Schedule ==
F	Finals

Women's Road Race
Event↓/Date →	5 September	6 September	7 September
B		F	
H1-4	F		
H5	F		
C1-3			F
C4-5		F	
T1-2			F

== Results ==
The event took place on 7 September 2024 at 9:48.

Rank	Rider	Nationality	Class	Time	Gap	Notes
1st place, gold medalist(s)	Emma Lund	Denmark	(T2)	1:00:16	+0	
2nd place, silver medalist(s)	Celine van Till	Switzerland	(T2)	1:00:16	+0	
3rd place, bronze medalist(s)	Marieke van Soest	Netherlands	(T1)	1:00:16	+0	
4	Jana Majunke	Germany	(T2)	1:00:24	+8	
5	Pavlina Vejvodova	Czech Republic	(T1)	1:09:39	+9:23	
6	Dulce Maria Gonzalez Guerrero	Mexico	(T1)	1:12:12	+11:56	

s.t. Same time
