= Triathlon at the 2024 Summer Paralympics =

Triathlon at the XVII Paralympic Games
- Venue: Pont d'Iéna
- Dates: 1–2 September 2024
- Competitors: 122 in 11 events from 31 nations

Triathlon at the 2024 Summer Paralympics in Paris, France, was contested at the Pont d'Iéna. It marked the third time the sport of para triathlon was included in the Summer Paralympics.

== Venue ==
The triathlon course started from Pont Alexandre III bridge near Seine River and ended at the same place. It involved a 750 metre Swim through Seine River, 20 km para cycling at Champs-Élysées, Avenue Montaigne, crossing the Seine by the Pont des Invalides and reaching the Quai d'Orsay with the last leg of 5 km run ending at Pont Alexandre III bridge.

== Qualification ==
There were a total of 11 events (6 men's and 5 women's). There were 120 slots (54 men, 50 women and 16 gender-free). The Paralympic qualification period was from 1 July 2023 to 1 July 2024. An NPC could send a maximum of 2 athletes per event. Out of 120 slots, 104 were to be qualified through ranking process and 16 other were filled with bipartite invitation by World Triathlon. In the event, World Triathlon granted two extra slots for a total of 122.

		PTWC	PTS2	PTS3	PTS4	PTS5	PTVI
Men	Ranking quotas 54	Australia; Austria; France; Italy; Italy; Japan; Netherlands; Netherlands; United States	Australia; Belgium; France; France; Italy; Netherlands; Spain; United States; United States	Australia; France; France; Germany; Great Britain; Netherlands; South Korea; Spain; Spain	Australia; Australia; Croatia; France; France; Great Britain; Spain; United States; United States	Australia; Australia; Brazil; Canada; Germany; Hungary; Portugal; Turkey; United States	Australia; France; France; Great Britain; Great Britain; Poland; Spain; United States; United States
Men	Bipartite quotas 12	Tunisia	Colombia	Neutral Paralympic Athletes; Trinidad and Tobago	France; Great Britain; Japan; Spain	Spain	Serbia; Japan; Spain
Women	Rankings Quotas 50	Australia; Brazil; Canada; France; Great Britain; Mexico; Spain; United States; United States	Australia; France; Germany; Italy; Japan; Spain; United States; United States; Venezuela	—N/a	Australia; Australia; France; France; Great Britain; Great Britain; Ireland; Mexico; Netherlands; Neutral Paralympic Athletes; South Africa; Spain; United States; United States	Canada; France; Great Britain; Great Britain; Poland; Poland; Spain; Ukraine; United States	Brazil; France; Germany; Great Britain; Ireland; Ireland; Italy; Italy; Spain
Women	Bipartite Quota 6		United States	—N/a	Germany; United States	Estonia	France; Kyrgyzstan
Total Athletes							122

== Schedule ==
All times and dates use Central European Summer Time (UTC+2)

OC	Opening ceremony	●	Event finals	CC	Closing ceremony

August				September								Events
28th Wed	29th Thu	30th Fri	31st Sat	1st Sun	2nd Mon	3rd Tue	4th Wed	5th Thu	6th Fri	7th Sat	8th Sun	Events
OC				●	●						CC	

== Medal table ==
* Host nation (France)

Rank	NPC	Gold	Silver	Bronze	Total
1	United States	3	3	2	8
2	Great Britain	2	1	2	5
3	France*	2	1	1	4
3	Spain	2	1	1	4
5	Netherlands	1	0	2	3
6	Australia	1	0	0	1
7	Italy	0	2	0	2
8	Germany	0	1	2	3
9	Austria	0	1	0	1
10	Canada	0	0	1	1
Totals (10 entries)		11	10	11	32

== Medalists ==
Event	Class	Gold	Silver	Bronze
Men	PTWC	Jetze Plat; Netherlands	Florian Brungraber; Austria	Geert Schipper; Netherlands
Men	PTS2	Jules Ribstein; France	Mohamed Lahna; United States	Mark Barr; United States
Men	PTS3	Daniel Molina; Spain	Max Gelhaar; Germany	Nico Van Der Burgt; Netherlands
Men	PTS4	Alexis Hanquinquant; France	Carson Clough; United States	Nil Riudavets; Spain
Men	PTS5	Chris Hammer; United States	{{Medal|Disqualified|	Martin Schulz; Germany
Men	PTVI	Dave Ellis; Great Britain	Thibaut Rigaudeau; France	Antoine Perel; France
Women	PTWC	Lauren Parker; Australia	Kendall Gretsch; United States	Leanne Taylor; Canada
Women	PTS2	Hailey Danz; United States	Veronica Yoko Plebani; Italy	Allysa Seely; United States
Women	PTS4	Megan Richter; Great Britain	Marta Francés Gómez; Spain	Hannah Moore; Great Britain
Women	PTS5	Grace Norman; United States	Claire Cashmore; Great Britain	Lauren Steadman; Great Britain
Women	PTVI	Susana Rodríguez; Spain	Francesca Tarantello; Italy	Anja Renner; Germany

== See also ==
- Triathlon at the 2024 Summer Olympics
- Triathlon at the Summer Paralympics
