= Triathlon at the 2024 Summer Paralympics – Men's PTS3 =

Men's PTS3 at the XVII Paralympic Games
- Venue: Pont Alexandre III
- Dates: 2 September 2024
- Competitors: 11 from 9 nations
- Winning time: 1:08:05

Medalists
1st place, gold medalist(s)		Daniel Molina	Spain
2nd place, silver medalist(s)		Max Gelhaar	Germany
3rd place, bronze medalist(s)		Nico van der Burgt	Netherlands

The Triathlon at the 2024 Summer Paralympics – Men's PTS3 event at the 2024 Paralympic Games took place at 09:25 CEST on 2 September 2024 at Pont Alexandre III, Paris. 11 athletes representing 9 nations competed. In addition, Ibrahim Al Hussein represented the Refugee Paralympic Team and Russian athlete Victor Chebotarev competed as a Neutral Paralympic Athlete.

== Venue ==
The triathlon course started from Pont Alexandre III bridge near Seine River and ended at the same place. The event was over sprint distance. There was be 750 metre Swim through Seine River, 20 km para cycling at Champs-Élysées, Avenue Montaigne, crossing the Seine by the Pont des Invalides and reaching the Quai d'Orsay and last leg of 5 km run will end at Pont Alexandre III bridge.

== Results ==
World Triathlon confirmed the final entry list for the event in August 2024.

Rank	Athlete	Nation	Swim	T1	Bike	T2	Run	Total time	Difference
1st place, gold medalist(s)	Daniel Molina	Spain	11:22	1:23	47:36	1:03	19:26	1:08:05	
2nd place, silver medalist(s)	Max Gelhaar	Germany	11:44	1:24	46:49	0:59	20:55	1:08:43	+0:38
3rd place, bronze medalist(s)	Nico van der Burgt	Netherlands	11:26	1:29	46:55	0:58	21:31	1:09:24	+1:19
4	Henry Urand	Great Britain	15:49	1:10	49:54	1:01	19:29	1:10:24	+2:19 1P
5	Cédric Denuzière	France	12:49	1:31	48:51	0:41	21:02	1:10:34	+2:29
6	Ibrahim Al Hussein	Refugee Paralympic Team	11:35	1:54	49:30	0:44	22:20	1:12:34	+4:29 1P
7	Diego Lardón	Spain	16:52	1:14	50:54	0:51	22:29	1:14:14	+6:09
8	Viktor Chebotarev	Neutral Paralympic Athletes	13:54	1:26	53:49	0:51	21:58	1:16:38	+8:33
9	Michael Herter	France	14:36	1:43	51:48	1:04	24:27	1:17:19	+9:14
10	Kim Hwang-tae	South Korea	24:58	1:06	1:01:33	1:09	21:19	1:24:01	+15:56
11	Justin Godfrey	Australia	17:15	2:15	56:24	0:55	35:30	1:32:49	+24:44
