= Cycling at the 2024 Summer Paralympics – Women's road time trial T1–2 =

Women's road time trial T1-2 at the XVII Paralympic Games
- Venue: Clichy-sous-Bois
- Dates: 4 September
- Competitors: 6 from 6 nations
- Winning time: 25:47.78

Medalists
1st place, gold medalist(s)		Marieke van Soest	Netherlands
2nd place, silver medalist(s)		Celine van Till	Switzerland
3rd place, bronze medalist(s)		Emma Lund	Denmark

The Women's time trial T1-2 road cycling event at the 2024 Summer Paralympics took place on 4 September 2024 at Clichy-sous-Bois, Paris. Six riders competed in the event.

The T1-2 classification is for tricycle cyclists with balance problems. This is a factored event.

== Results ==
Rank	Rider	Nationality	Class	r.t.	Factor	Result	n.d.	Notes
1st place, gold medalist(s)	Marieke van Soest	Netherlands	T1	29:03.58	88.77%	25:47.78		
2nd place, silver medalist(s)	Celine van Till	Switzerland	T2	27:58.13	100.00%	27:58.13	+02:10.35	
3rd place, bronze medalist(s)	Emma Lund	Denmark	T2	28:52.13	100.00%	28:52.13	+03:04.35	
4	Pavlina Vejvodova	Czech Republic	T1	32:33.11	88.77%	28:53.78	+03:06.00	
5	Jana Majunke	Germany	T2	29:40.76	100.00%	29:40.76	+03:52.98	
6	Dulce Maria Gonzalez Guerrero	Mexico	T1	33:47.43	88.77%	29:59.75	+04:11.97	
