= Equestrian at the 2024 Summer Paralympics – Individual championship test grade III =

Equestrian – Individual championship test, grade III at the XVII Paralympic Games
- Venue: Palace of Versailles
- Date: 3 September 2024
- Competitors: 13 from 12 nations
- Winning score: 77.900

Medalists
1st place, gold medalist(s)		Rebecca Hart riding Floratina	United States
2nd place, silver medalist(s)		Rixt van der Horst riding Royal Fonq	Netherlands
3rd place, bronze medalist(s)		Natasha Baker riding Dawn Chorus	Great Britain

The individual championship test, grade III, para-equestrian dressage event at the 2024 Summer Paralympics was held on 3 September, 2024 at the Palace of Versailles in Paris.

The competition was assessed by a ground jury composed of five judges placed at locations designated E, H, C, M, and B. Each judge rated the competitors' performances with a percentage score. The five scores from the jury were then averaged to determine a rider's total percentage score.

== Classification ==
Grade III riders are described by the IPC as "athletes [that] have severe impairments in both legs with minimal or no impairment of the trunk or moderate impairment of the arms and legs and trunk."

== Results ==
Riders performed one test apiece. In addition to being an event in its own right, the Championship test was the qualification round for the Freestyle event, with the top eight riders progressing to the second final. 13 Riders started the event.

Rank	Rider Horse	Nation	Scores					Total	FSQ
Rank	Rider Horse	Nation	E	H	C	M	B	Total	FSQ
1st place, gold medalist(s)	Rebecca Hart riding Floratina	United States (USA)	75.000	78.667	81.500	74.833	79.500	77.900	Q
2nd place, silver medalist(s)	Rixt van der Horst riding Royal Fonq	Netherlands (NED)	76.667	77.000	78.333	72.500	77.667	76.433	Q
3rd place, bronze medalist(s)	Natasha Baker riding Dawn Chorus	Great Britain (GBR)	72.500	70.167	72.833	75.333	75.000	73.167	Q
4	Francesca Salvade riding Escari	Italy (ITA)	72.500	70.333	71.833	69.833	73.333	71.566	Q
5	Chiara Zenati riding Swing Royal	France (FRA)	71.667	69.833	67.500	70.333	73.333	70.533	Q
6	Karla Dyhm-Junge riding Miss Daisy	Denmark (DEN)	69.333	69.167	68.333	71.667	69.500	69.600	Q
7	Barbara Minneci riding Stuart	Belgium (BEL)	66.333	67.167	68.667	65.833	70.333	67.667	Q
8	Renee Claesson-Ribring riding Zapp Vs	Sweden (SWE)	68.000	65.333	69.167	66.833	68.167	67.500	Q
9	Kate Kerr-Horan riding Lykkebo's Don Akino	Ireland (IRL)	66.667	64.333	65.333	68.000	65.000	65.867	
10	Jessica McKenna riding Davidoff 188	Ireland (IRL)	62.833	65.333	62.167	68.000	66.833	65.033	
11	Thomas Haller riding Espalion	Austria (AUT)	62.000	63.333	62.667	62.833	67.833	63.733	
12	Hilary Su Hui'En riding Gambler	Singapore (SGP)	62.500	63.833	58.333	63.000	60.833	61.700	
13	Ignacio Trevino Fuerte riding Kukul Ls La Silla	Mexico (MEX)	59.500	62.167	58.167	63.167	63.333	61.267	
