= Triathlon at the 2024 Summer Paralympics – Men's PTWC =

Men's PTWC at the XVII Paralympic Games
- Venue: Pont Alexandre III
- Dates: 2 September 2024
- Winning time: 58:16

Medalists
1st place, gold medalist(s)		Jetze Plat	Netherlands
2nd place, silver medalist(s)		Florian Brungraber	Austria
3rd place, bronze medalist(s)		Geert Schipper	Netherlands

The Triathlon at the 2024 Summer Paralympics – Men's PTWC event at the 2024 Paralympic Games took place at 07:15 CET on 2 September 2024 at Pont Alexandre III, Paris.

== Venue ==
The triathlon course will start from Pont Alexandre III bridge near Seine River and will end at the same place. The event will be over sprint distance. There will be 750 metre Swim through Seine River, 20 km para cycling at Champs-Élysées, Avenue Montaigne, crossing the Seine by the Pont des Invalides and reaching the Quai d'Orsay and last leg of 5 km run will end at Pont Alexandre III bridge.

== Entry list ==
World Triathlon confirmed the final entry list for the event in August 2024. Men's PTWC is a combined classification event, including PTWC1 (more impaired) and PTWC2 (less impaired) athletes. As such, the race will use an interval start as set out in World Triathlon competition rules, with PTWC2 athletes entering the water three minutes after their PTWC1 colleagues. The three minutes is included in the final time as part of the swim leg.

== Results ==
PTWC1 athletes are marked : ^{§}

Rank	Bib	Name	Nationality	c.t.	Swim	T1	Bike	T2	Run	Time	Notes
1st place, gold medalist(s)		Jetze Plat	Netherlands	3:00.00	13:19	1:14	31:19	0:40	11:44	58:16	
2nd place, silver medalist(s)		Florian Brungraber	Austria	3:00.00	14:15	1:14	31:49	0:51	11:16	59:12	
3rd place, bronze medalist(s)		Geert Schipper	Netherlands	3:00.00	14:21	1:06	32:42	0:42	11:29	1:00:20	
4		Louis Noël	France	3:00.00	14:19	1:14	35:20	0:30	12:17	1:03:40	
5		Giovanni Achenza ^{§}	Italy	-	12:54	1:07	35:49	0:39	13:20	1:03:49	
6		Nic Beveridge ^{§}	Australia	-	12:31	1:29	37:27	0:48	12:56	1:05:11	
7		Fethi Zouinkhi^{§}	Tunisia	-	13:29	1:16	37:26	0:51	12:47	1:05:49	
8		Jumpei Kimura ^{§}	Japan	-	13:40	1:10	39:04	0:41	13:19	1:07:54	
9		Howie Sanborn ^{§}	United States	-	14:24	1:36	34:06	0:46	18:49	1:09:41	
-		Giuseppe Romele ^{§}	Italy	-	~~11:31~~	~~1:23~~	~~35:21~~	~~0:36~~	~~13:34~~	DQ	

Key : T = Transition; L = Lap
