= Emma Lund =

Danish Paralympic cyclist (born 1997)

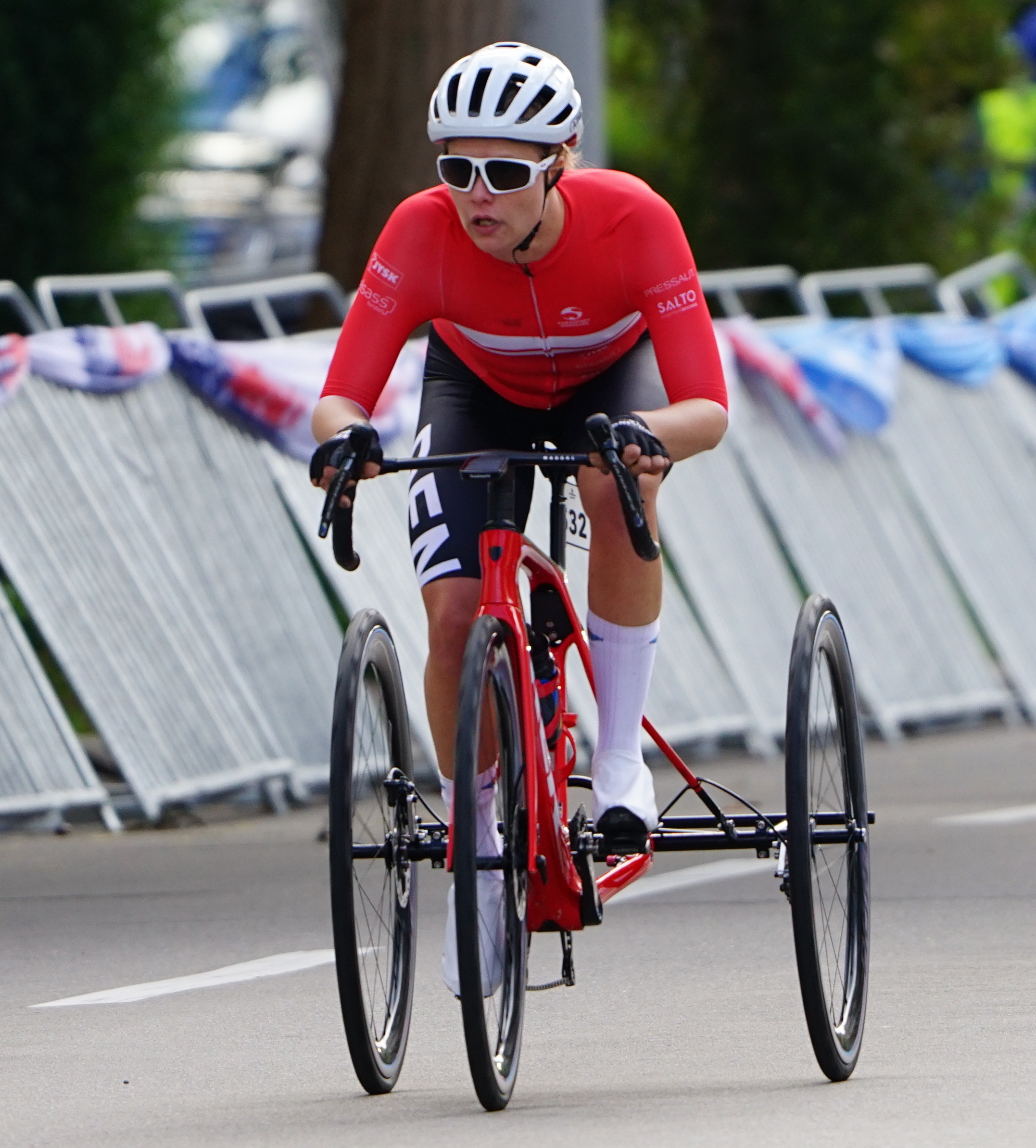
- Lund during the 2024 World Championships

Personal information
- Born: 2 July 1997 (age 28) Copenhagen, Denmark

Sport
- Sport: Para cycling
- Disability: Cerebral palsy
- Club: Roskilde Cycle Club
Medal record
Representing Denmark
Paralympic Games
Gold medal – first place	2024 Paris	Road race T1–2
Bronze medal – third place	2024 Paris	Road time trial T1–2
Road World Championships
Gold medal – first place	2023 Glasgow	Road race T2
Silver medal – second place	2024 Zurich	Road race T2
Silver medal – second place	2024 Zurich	Time trial T2
Bronze medal – third place	2022 Baie-Comeau	Road race T2
Bronze medal – third place	2023 Glasgow	Time trial T2
European Para Championships
Bronze medal – third place	2023 Rotterdam	Road race T2
Bronze medal – third place	2023 Rotterdam	Time trial T2

Emma Tjerrild Lund (born 2 July 1997) is a Danish Paralympic cyclist who competes in international cycling competitions. She is a World champion and double European bronze medalists in road bicycle racing and had qualified to compete at the 2024 Summer Paralympics.

== Career ==
Lund received the Helene Elsass Award in April 2024 following her success at the World Championships.
