= Giovanni Achenza =

Italian Paralympic athlete (born 1971)

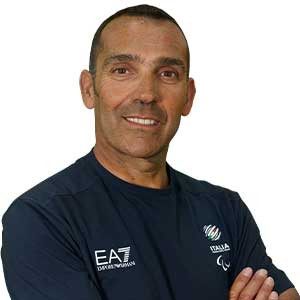
- Achenza in 2025

Personal information
- Born: 31 July 1971 (age 55) Ozieri, Sardinia, Italy

Sport
- Country: Italy
- Sport: Paratriathlon
Medal record
Representing Italy
Men's paratriathlon
Paralympic Games
Bronze medal – third place	2016 Rio de Janeiro	PT1
Bronze medal – third place	2020 Tokyo	PTWC
World Championships
Bronze medal – third place	2019 Lausanne	PTWC
European Championships
Gold medal – first place	2019 Valencia	PTWC
Bronze medal – third place	2015 Geneva	PT1
Bronze medal – third place	2017 Kitzbühel	PTWC
Bronze medal – third place	2018 Tartu	PTWC
Men's para-duathlon
European Championships
Gold medal – first place	2023 Venice-Caorle	PTWC

Giovanni Achenza (born 31 July 1971) is an Italian paratriathlete. He represented Italy at the 2016 Summer Paralympics in the men's PT1 event, as well as at the 2020 Summer Paralympics in the men's PTWC event, winning the bronze medal in both competitions. He also competed in the men's PTWC event at the 2024 Summer Paralympics in Paris, France.
