= Rebecca Hart =

American para-equestrian (born 1984)

Medal record

Para-equestrian

Representing United States

Paralympic Games
Gold medal – first place	2024 Paris	Individual championship test grade III
Gold medal – first place	2024 Paris	Individual freestyle test grade III
Gold medal – first place	2024 Paris	Team

Rebecca Hart (born October 26, 1984) is a para-equestrian from Pittsburgh, Pennsylvania, who won gold at the 2024 Paris Paralympics. Hart was born with a rare genetic disease, familial spastic paraplegia (FSP) which, as a child, made it difficult for her to gain strength in her upper body as well as slowing her motor development.

At the age of 10, Hart began horse riding. A few years later, after attending Paralympic regional competition in Atlanta, Georgia in 1998, Hart realized she would like to train for competition. That year, 1998, she got her first horse.

Hart has been the United States Equestrian Federation (USEF) National Para-Equestrian Champion six times: 2006, 2008, 2009, 2010, 2012, and 2014. Hart made her first appearance at the Beijing Paralympics in 2008, competing with her horse Norteassa. She was placed 4th in freestyle.

She went on to compete at the World Equestrian Games (WEG) in Lexington, Kentucky, her last competition with Norteassa. After Norteassa's retirement, she went on to ride Missy Ransehousen's Lord Ludger ('LoLu') for the 2012 season. That season, Hart and LoLu won the Wellington Sunshine Classic CPEDI3* and the 2012 National Para-Equestrian Championships. Hart and LoLu were named as members of the 2012 United States Paralympic Team, and Hart was named Team Captain. Hart scored the highest of the U.S. team members at the 2012 London Paralympics.

Schroeter's Romani was purchased for Hart at the end of 2014. Together they were named the National Champions in 2014, along with being selected for the 2014 World Equestrian Games in Normandy, France. Soon after Hart won the 2015 Global/Adequan CPEDI3* in Florida.

== Personal life ==
Hart was born in Pittsburgh on October 26, 1984. She attended Villa Maria Academy High School in Erie, PA and graduated in 2003. She attended Pennsylvania State University, graduating in 2009 with a degree in business.

== Paralympic career ==
Hart has a Grade II classification in Paralympic sport and has competed in both individual and team dressage events. She competed at the Summer Paralympics in 2008, 2012, 2016, and 2024. She won gold at the 2024 Summer Paralympics.

== Awards and recognition ==
Hart was awarded the 2015 Travel & Training Fund Grant Recipient from The Women's Sports Foundation.

== See also ==
- List of Pennsylvania State University Olympians
