= Elke van Engelen =

German paratriathlete (born 1965)

Personal information
- Born: 27 August 1965 (age 60) Heiligenstadt in Oberfranken, Germany

Sport
- Sport: Paratriathlon
- Disability class: PTS4
Medal record
Representing Germany
ITU World Championships
Bronze medal – third place	2019 Lausanne	PTS4
Bronze medal – third place	2023 Abu Dhabi	PTS4
ITU European Championships
Gold medal – first place	2019 Valencia	PTS4
Silver medal – second place	2021 Valencia	PTS4
Bronze medal – third place	2022 Olsztyn	PTS4

Elke van Engelen (born 27 August 1965) is a German former paratriathlete who competed in international triathlons. She is a three-time German champion, European champion and World bronze medalist. She competed at the 2024 Summer Paralympics but did not medal.

van Engelen retired from competition in January 2025 as she focused on her family and her career as a dentist.
