= Jana Spegel =

German para table tennis player

Personal information
- Full name: Jana Margarete Spegel
- Born: 4 May 2003 (age 23) Stuttgart, Germany

Sport
- Sport: Para table tennis
Medal record
Representing Germany
World Championships
Bronze medal – third place	2022 Granada	Singles C1
European Championships
Silver medal – second place	2023 Sheffield	Singles C1

Jana Margarete Spegel (born 4 May 2003) is a German para table tennis player who competes in international table tennis competitions. She is a World bronze and European silver medalist, she has competed at the 2024 Summer Paralympics but did not medal.
