= Triathlon at the 2016 Summer Paralympics – Men's PT1 =

Men's PT1 at the XV Paralympic Games
- Venue: Fort Copacabana
- Dates: 10 September 2016
- Competitors: 10 from 7 nations

Medalists
1st place, gold medalist(s)		Jetze Plat	Netherlands
2nd place, silver medalist(s)		Geert Schipper	Netherlands
3rd place, bronze medalist(s)		Giovanni Achenza	Italy

The Triathlon at the 2016 Summer Paralympics – Men's PT1 event at the 2016 Paralympic Games took place at 11:20 on 10 September 2016 at Fort Copacabana.

== Results ==
Rank	Bib	Name	Nationality	Swim	1st transition	Bike lap 1	Bike lap 2	Bike lap 3	Bike lap 4	2nd transition	Run lap 1	Run lap 2	Time
1st place, gold medalist(s)	101	Jetze Plat	Netherlands	10:24	1:29	8:11	8:33	8:46	8:46	0:46	5:47	6:49	59:31
2nd place, silver medalist(s)	102	Geert Schipper	Netherlands	11:48	1:30	8:35	8:52	8:59	9:00	0:50	5:39	6:17	1:01:30
3rd place, bronze medalist(s)	107	Giovanni Achenza	Italy	11:51	1:32	8:31	8:49	9:02	9:01	0:45	5:44	6:30	1:01:45
4	106	Bill Chaffey	Australia	11:21	1:27	8:56	9:10	9:24	9:47	0:48	5:41	6:27	1:03:01
5	110	Krige Schabort	United States	11:51	1:21	8:54	9:14	9:25	9:33	0:55	5:43	6:19	1:03:15
6	109	Joe Townsend	Great Britain	14:47	1:07	7:30	10:09	9:12	9:30	0:39	5:33	6:16	1:04:43
7	104	Fernando Aranha	Brazil	13:11	1:21	9:14	9:29	9:36	9:40	0:58	6:17	7:05	1:06:51
8	108	Phil Hogg	Great Britain	11:55	1:34	9:53	10:05	10:06	10:26	1:00	6:23	6:58	1:08:20
9	105	Nic Beveridge	Australia	11:57	1:43	10:14	9:50	11:50	11:01	1:00	6:12	6:48	1:10:35
10	103	Jumpei Kimura	Japan	13:04	1:36	9:54	10:31	10:21	10:34	1:08	7:41	8:53	1:13:42

Source: "Men's - PT1 Schedute and Results". Rio 2016 Paralympic Games.
