= Maurice Schmidt =

German wheelchair fencer (born 1999)

Personal information
- Born: 13 August 1999 (age 26) Laichingen, Germany

Fencing career
- Sport: Fencing
- Weapon: Épée A / Sabre A
- Disability class: A
Medal record
Wheelchair fencing
Representing Germany
Summer Paralympics
Gold medal – first place	2024 Paris	Sabre A

Maurice Schmidt (born 13 August 1999) is a German wheelchair fencer who competes in both épée and sabre. He is the 2024 Paralympic champion in the Individual Sabre A classification.

== Career ==
Schmidt began wheelchair fencing as a teenager, having first encountered it at the Böblingen city festival. He fences for SV Böblingen in all disciplines (sabre, épée, foil). In 2015, he became a two-time U17 Junior World Champion and U23 Vice World Champion, and was named Junior Athlete of the Year in Disabled Sports. He has been German (Junior) Champion a total of 23 times.

At the 2024 Summer Paralympics in Paris, Schmidt won the gold medal in the sabre.
