= Kim Marie Vaske =

German Paralympic track and field athlete

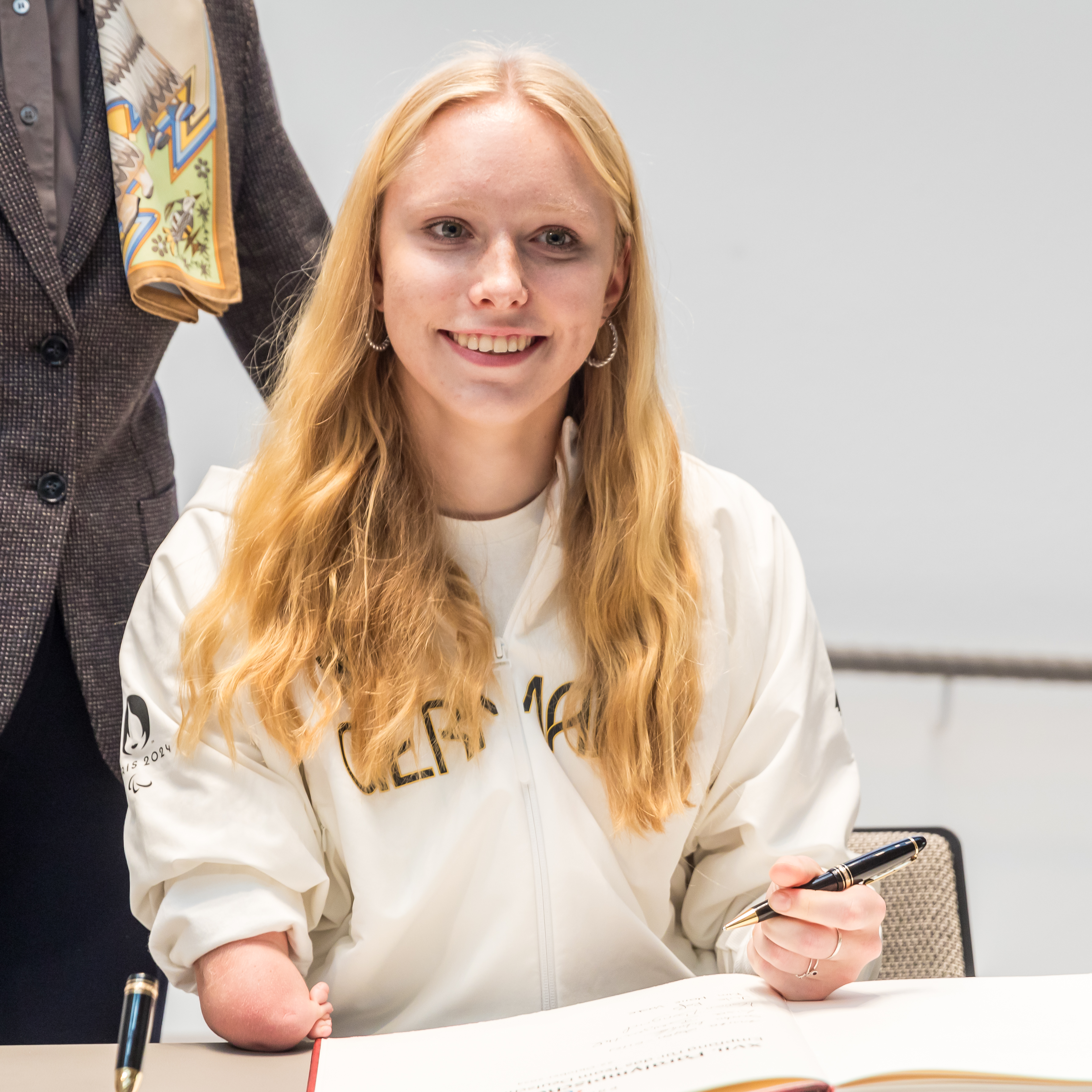
- Kim Marie Vaske in 2024

Personal information
- Nationality: German
- Born: Kim Marie Vaske; 11 March 2005 (age 21) Steinfurt, Germany

Sport
- Sport: track and field

Kim Marie Vaske (born 11 March 2005) is a German para-athlete who competes in track and field events.

== Early life ==
Vaske was born in the town of Steinfurt in North Rhine-Westphalia. She studied at German Sport University Cologne.

== Sporting career ==
Vaske is a member of the German Disabled Sports Association. Vaske was voted Emsdetten Sportswoman of the Year 2023. She competed in the 2023 World Para Athletics Championships in Paris. She competed in long hump. At the 2024 Summer Paralympics, she participated as an athlete. She competed in Shot put but missed out in the top ten at her debut. Vaske achieved a personal best of 10.82 meters in the shot put at the 2025 World Para Athletics Championships.
