= Jan Haller =

German wheelchair basketball player

Hannover United

Personal information
- Born: 1 October 1988 (age 38) Hanover, Germany
Medals
Men's wheelchair basketball
Representing Germany
Paralympic Games
| Bronze medal – third place | 2024 Paris | Team |

Jan Haller (born 1 October 1988) is a German wheelchair basketball player and Paralympian. He is a 2 point player and is a member of Hannover United (since 2018) and part of Germany men's national wheelchair basketball team since 2011.

Haller played in the national team at the 2012 Summer Paralympics, 2016 Summer Paralympics, 2020 Summer Paralympics and 2024 Summer Paralympics. He has been the captain of the national team and also played at many other international competitions.

He studied Sports Management at the IST University of Applied Sciences in Dusseldorf.
