= Equestrian at the 2024 Summer Paralympics – Individual freestyle test grade III =

Equestrian – Individual freestyle test, grade III at the XVII Paralympic Games
- Venue: Palais de Versailles
- Date: 7 September 2024
- Competitors: 8 from 8 nations
- Winning score: 83.53

Medalists
1st place, gold medalist(s)		Rebecca Hart on Floratina	United States
2nd place, silver medalist(s)		Rixt van der Horst on Royal Fonq	Netherlands
3rd place, bronze medalist(s)		Natasha Baker on Dawn Chorus	Great Britain

The individual freestyle test, grade III, para-equestrian dressage event at the 2024 Summer Paralympics was contested on the afternoon of 7 September 2024 at the Olympic Equestrian Centre in Rio de Janeiro.

The competition was assessed by a ground jury composed of five judges placed at locations designated E, H, C, M, and B. Each judge rated the competitors' performances with a percentage score across two areas - technique and artistry. The ten scores from the jury were then averaged to determine a rider's total percentage score.

== Ground jury ==
Judge at E	Suzanne Cunningham ( Australia)
Judge at H	Freddy Leyman ( Belgium)
Judge at C	Kristi Wysocki ( United States), jury president
Judge at M	Katherine Lucheschi ( Italy)
Judge at B	Ineke Jansen ( Netherlands)

== Results ==
Rank	Rider Horse	Nationality	Section	E	H	C	M	B	Avg	Result
1st place, gold medalist(s)	Rebecca Hart; Floratina	United States		84.67	86.00	83.33	81.97	81.70		83.53
1st place, gold medalist(s)	Rebecca Hart; Floratina	United States	Tech.	82.33	82.00	77.67	78.33	78.00	79.67	83.53
1st place, gold medalist(s)	Rebecca Hart; Floratina	United States	Art.	87.00	90.00	89.00	85.60	85.40	87.40	83.53
2nd place, silver medalist(s)	Rixt van der Horst; Royal Fonq	Netherlands		80.03	85.00	81.33	84.13	84.53		83.01
2nd place, silver medalist(s)	Rixt van der Horst; Royal Fonq	Netherlands	Tech.	77.67	83.00	76.67	80.67	82.67	80.13	83.01
2nd place, silver medalist(s)	Rixt van der Horst; Royal Fonq	Netherlands	Art.	82.40	87.00	86.00	87.60	86.40	85.88	83.01
3rd place, bronze medalist(s)	Natasha Baker; Dawn Chorus	Great Britain		78.70	79.00	74.33	76.80	76.87		77.14
3rd place, bronze medalist(s)	Natasha Baker; Dawn Chorus	Great Britain	Tech.	77.00	77.00	70.67	73.00	73.33	74.20	77.14
3rd place, bronze medalist(s)	Natasha Baker; Dawn Chorus	Great Britain	Art.	80.40	81.00	78.00	80.60	80.40	80.08	77.14
4	Chiara Zenati; Swing Royal	France		73.30	80.00	73.43	76.00	76.83		75.91
4	Chiara Zenati; Swing Royal	France	Tech.	72.00	78.00	70.67	72.00	73.67	73.27	75.91
4	Chiara Zenati; Swing Royal	France	Art.	74.60	82.00	76.20	80.00	80.00	78.56	75.91
5	Francesca Salvade'; Escari	Italy		78.33	75.33	73.97	78.50	72.97		75.82
5	Francesca Salvade'; Escari	Italy	Tech.	76.67	72.67	70.33	75.00	70.33	73.00	75.82
5	Francesca Salvade'; Escari	Italy	Art.	80.00	78.00	77.60	82.00	75.60	78.64	75.82
6	Karla Dyhm-Junge; Miss Daisy	Denmark		73.77	72.33	73.63	73.83	73.27		73.37
6	Karla Dyhm-Junge; Miss Daisy	Denmark	Tech.	74.33	72.67	71.67	70.67	70.33	71.93	73.37
6	Karla Dyhm-Junge; Miss Daisy	Denmark	Art.	73.20	72.00	75.60	77.00	76.20	74.80	73.37
7	Barbara Minneci; Stuart	Belgium		68.13	73.33	71.17	73.73	75.03		72.28
7	Barbara Minneci; Stuart	Belgium	Tech.	66.67	70.67	68.33	69.67	70.67	69.20	72.28
7	Barbara Minneci; Stuart	Belgium	Art.	69.60	76.00	74.00	77.80	79.40	75.36	72.28
8	Renee Claesson-Ribring; Zapp Vs	Sweden		68.17	71.00	73.97	73.77	69.63		71.31
8	Renee Claesson-Ribring; Zapp Vs	Sweden	Tech.	64.33	69.00	71.33	69.33	66.67	68.13	71.31
8	Renee Claesson-Ribring; Zapp Vs	Sweden	Art.	72.00	73.00	76.60	78.20	72.60	74.48	71.31
