= Geert Schipper (paratriathlete) =

Dutch paralympic paratriathlete

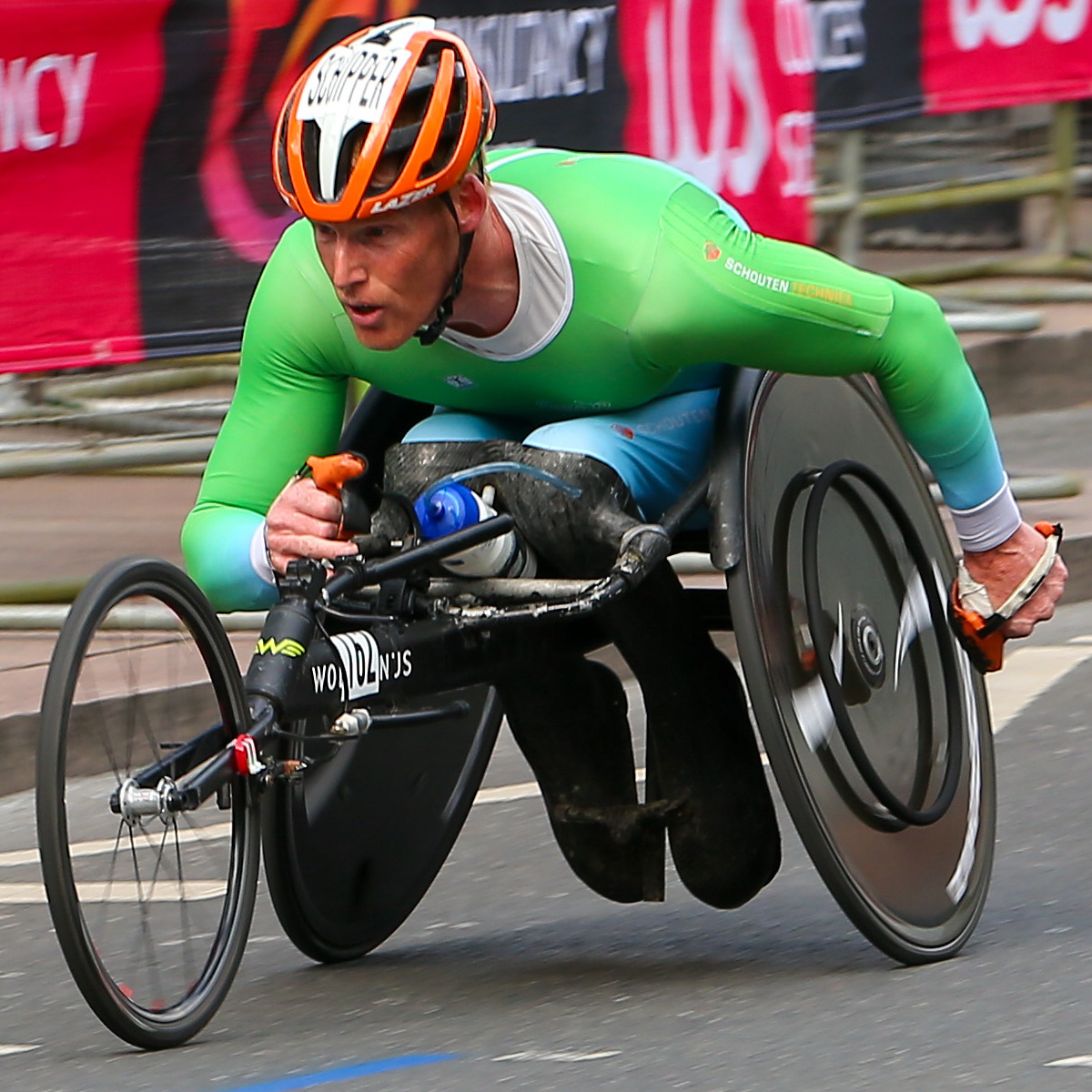
- Schipper at the 2024 London Marathon

Sport
- Country: Netherlands
- Sport: Paratriathlon
Medal record
Representing Netherlands
Men's paratriathlon
Paralympic Games
Silver medal – second place	2016 Rio de Janeiro	PT1
Bronze medal – third place	2024 Paris	PTWC
World Championships
Gold medal – first place	2023 Ponteverde	PTWC
Silver medal – second place	2017 Rotterdam	PTWC
Silver medal – second place	2018 Gold Coast	PTWC
Silver medal – second place	2019 Lausanne	PTWC
Silver medal – second place	2021 Abu Dhabi	PTWC
Bronze medal – third place	2014 Edmonton	PT1
Bronze medal – third place	2016 Rotterdam	PT1
Bronze medal – third place	2022 Abu Dhabi	PTWC
European Championships
Gold medal – first place	2018 Tartu	PTWC
Gold medal – first place	2024 Vichy	PTWC
Silver medal – second place	2016 Lisbon	PT1
Silver medal – second place	2019 Valencia	PTWC
Silver medal – second place	2022 Olsztyn	PTWC
Silver medal – second place	2025 Besançon	PTWC
Bronze medal – third place	2021 Valencia	PTWC
Bronze medal – third place	2023 Madrid	PTWC
Men's para-duathlon
European Championships
Gold medal – first place	2016 Kalkar	PT1

Geert Schipper is a Dutch paralympic paratriathlete. He competed at the 2024 Summer Paralympics in the paratriathlon competition, winning the bronze medal in the men's PTWC event. He had previously competed at the 2016 Summer Paralympics in the paratriathlon competition, winning the silver medal in the men's PT1 event, and at the 2020 Summer Paralympics in the paratriathlon competition.
