= Marieke van Soest =

Dutch para-cyclist and swimmer

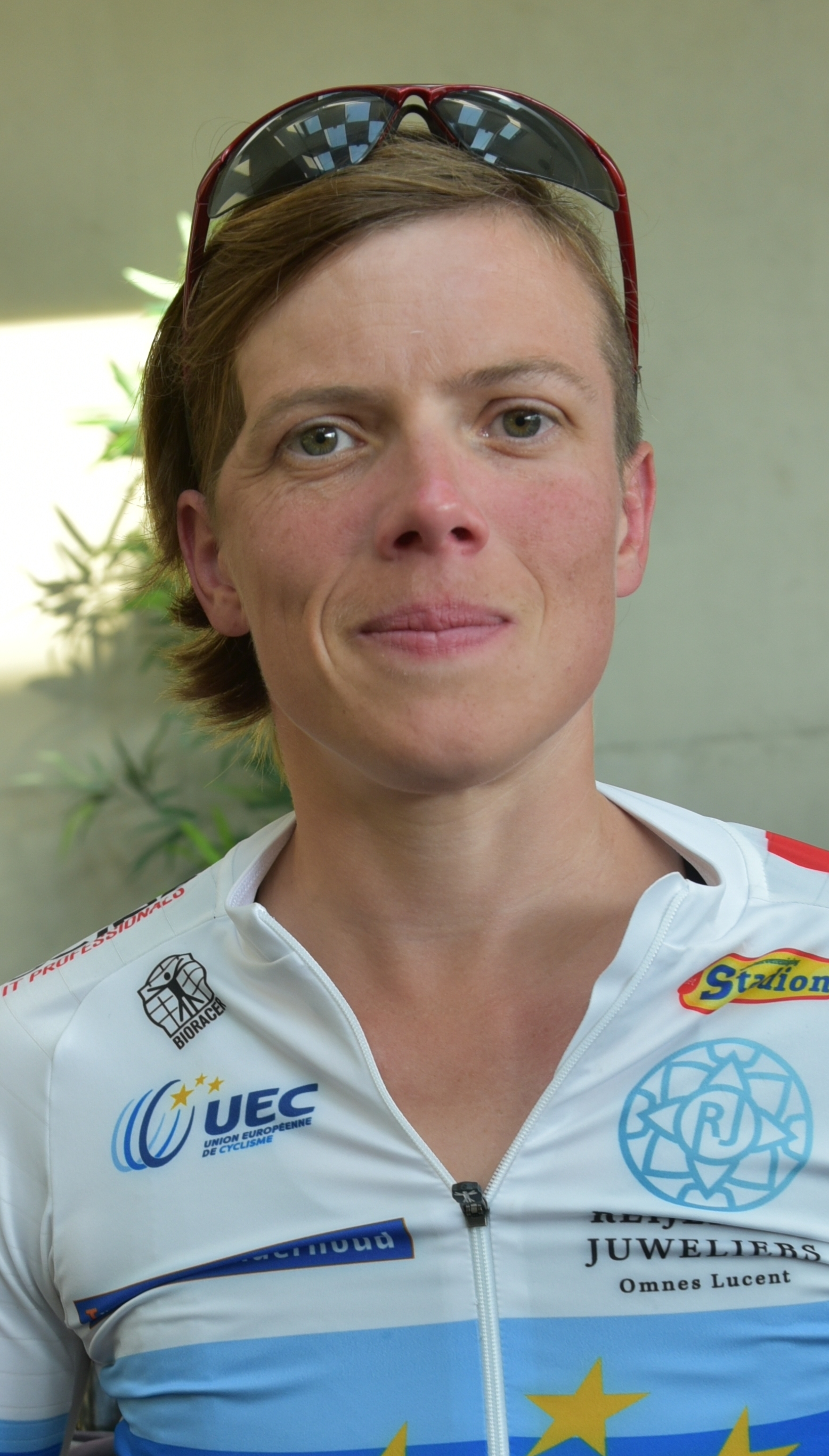
- van Soest in 2022

Personal information
- Born: 23 April 1987 (age 39) Nijkerk, Netherlands

Cycling career
- Sport: Cycling
- Discipline: Road
- Role: Rider
Medal record
Women's Para-cycling
Representing Netherlands
Paralympic Games
Gold medal – first place	2024 Paris	Road time trial T1–2
Bronze medal – third place	2024 Paris	Road race T1–2
Road World Championships
Gold medal – first place	2022 Baie-Comeau	Time trial T1
Gold medal – first place	2022 Baie-Comeau	Road Race T1
Gold medal – first place	2024 Zurich	Time trial T1
Gold medal – first place	2024 Zurich	Road Race T1
Gold medal – first place	2025 Ronse	Time trial T1
Gold medal – first place	2025 Ronse	Road Race T1

Marieke van Soest (born 23 April 1987) is a Dutch para-swimmer and cyclist. In cycling, she competes on a tricycle.

== Sporting career ==
Marieke van Soest was born and raised in Nijkerk, the third child in a family with four children. She is a member of a Reformed district church that belongs to the Evangelical Church in the Netherlands. In 2014, she fell into a coma at the University Medical Center Utrecht due to an aneurysm, when she was actually there because of an infection in her ankle. Since she was already in hospital, an operation was able to save her life. Rehabilitation lasted two years and she had to have an artificial skull inserted. She is dependent on an electric wheelchair because she is paralyzed on one side.

After her rehabilitation, van Soest devoted herself to swimming, which she had already done before her illness. She taught herself to move in the water with one arm and one leg, and she became Dutch champion in the individual medley in 2017 and 2018. Despite these achievements, the Royal Dutch Swimming Federation (KNZB) did not nominate her for the 2020 Summer Paralympics; she herself believes that she was given preference over athletes with less disabilities: "You would have had to take the wheelchair with you and someone would have had to help me change for the swim."

In the spring of 2019, van Soest therefore decided to start cycling. To do this, the Royal Dutch Cycling Union initially loaned her a tricycle, which was not suitable for international competitions. In March 2020, she received a bike specially built for her by frame builder Ben de Ruiter.

In 2020 and 2021, van Soest became Dutch champion, and in 2021 she became European champion. In May 2022 she won three World Cups and two European Cups. In August 2022 she became (as the first Dutch woman) tricycle world champion in the road race and time trial, and in September 2022 Dutch champion in both disciplines.
