= Dulce María González =

Mexican writer and educator (1958–2014)

- Born: July 11, 1958; Monterrey, Nuevo León, Mexico
- Died: July 11, 2014 (aged 56); Monterrey, Nuevo León, Mexico
- Education: Autonomous University of Nuevo León
- Occupations: Writer; educator

Dulce María González (July 11, 1958 – July 11, 2014) was a Mexican writer and educator. In 2003, she was awarded the UNAL's Premio a las Artes for her work.

== Biography ==
She was born in Monterrey and studied Spanish literature at the Universidad Autónoma de Nuevo León (UANL). González was editor for the literary column of the newspaper El Norte. She also contributed to the newspaper El Porvenir, to the UANL journals Deslinde and Vida Universitaria and was founder and editorial advisor for the magazines Otra Orilla, El Correo Chuan and Papeles de la Mancuspia. She was a fellow of the Fondo Estatal para la Cultura y las Artes de Nuevo León. González taught literature at the University of Monterrey, literary appreciation for the UANL faculty of Medicine and taught at the theatre school of the UANL faculty of Philosophy and Letters. She was coordinator for the Centro de Escritores de Nuevo León from 2003 to 2005.

González died in Monterrey at the age of 56 after being hospitalized for cancer.

== Awards ==
- 2003, UNAL's Premio a las Artes

== Selected works ==
- Gestus, theatrical criticism (1991)
- Detrás de la máscara, short stories (1993)
- Donde habiten los dioses, prose (1994)
- Ojos de Santa, poetry (1996)
- Elogio del triángulo, short stories (1998)
- Mercedes luminosa, novel (2005), received the Premio Nuevo León de Literatura
- Encuentro con Antonio, novel (2006)
- Los suaves ángulos, novel (2009)
- Un océano divide, poetry (2012), with photographer Oswaldo Ruiz
