= Nele Moos =

German Paralympic athlete

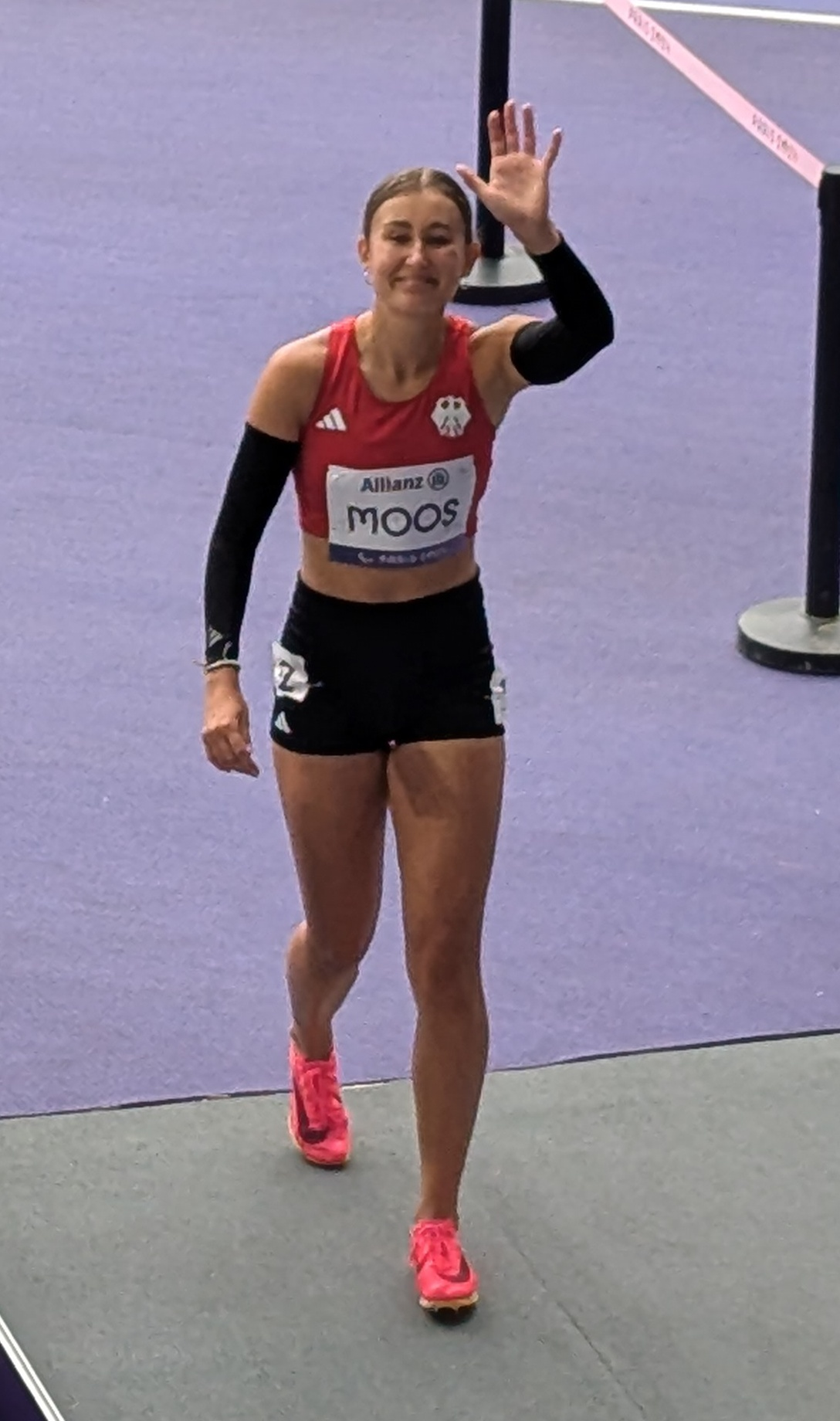
- Moos at the 2024 Summer Paralympics

Personal information
- Born: 23 November 2001 (age 24) Duisburg, Germany

Sport
- Country: Germany
- Sport: Paralympic athletics
- Disability class: T38
- Event(s): 100 metres 400 metres Long jump
- Club: TSV Bayer 04 Leverkusen
- Coached by: Erik Schneider
Medal record
Paralympic athletics
Representing Germany
Paralympic Games
Silver medal – second place	2024 Paris	Long jump T38
World Championships
Bronze medal – third place	2023 Paris	Long jump T38
World Junior Championships
Silver medal – second place	2019 Nottwil	Long jump T38

Nele Moos (born 23 November 2001) is a German Paralympic athlete who competes in long jump and sprinting events at international track and field competitions. She is a World bronze medalist and World junior silver medalist, she has competed at the 2020 Summer Paralympics in the 100 metres and 400 metres but did not medal in her events.
