= Vanessa Erskine =

American wheelchair basketball player

Personal information
- Born: July 12, 1994 (age 32) Kearney, Missouri, United States

Sport
- Sport: Wheelchair basketball
Medal record
Representing United States
Paralympic Games
Gold medal – first place	2016 Rio de Janeiro	Women's
Parapan American Games
Gold medal – first place	2015 Toronto	Women's

Vanessa Erskine (born July 12, 1994) is an American-born German wheelchair basketball player. She is a Paralympic champion at the 2016 Summer Paralympics competing for the United States before switching to Germany in 2017.

Erskine was severely injured in a bullfighting accident which left her with a spinal cord injury.
