= Daniel Molina =

Spanish Paralympic triathlete (born 1974)

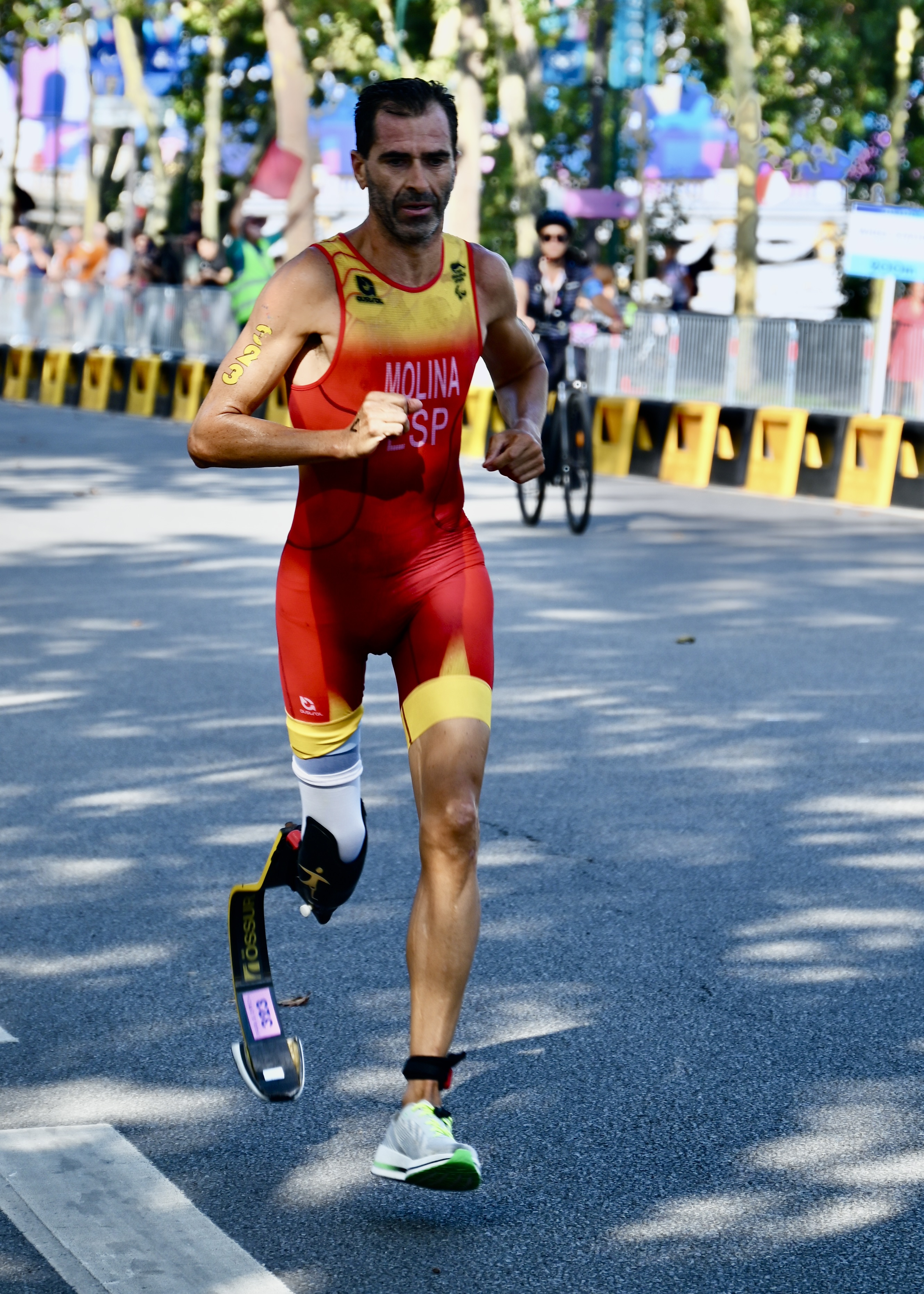
- Molina at the 2024 Summer Paralympics

Personal information
- Full name: Daniel Molina Martínez
- Nationality: Spanish
- Born: 15 September 1974 (age 52) Madrid, Spain
Medal record
Representing Spain
Men's paratriathlon
Paralympic Games
Gold medal – first place	2024 Paris	PTS3
World Championships
Gold medal – first place	2017 Rotterdam	PTS3
Gold medal – first place	2018 Gold Coast	PTS3
Gold medal – first place	2019 Lausanne	PTS3
Gold medal – first place	2022 Abu Dhabi	PTS3
Gold medal – first place	2023 Pontevedra	PTS3
Silver medal – second place	2012 Auckland	TRI 2
Silver medal – second place	2013 London	TRI-2
Silver medal – second place	2021 Abu Dhabi	PTS3
Silver medal – second place	2024 Torremolinos	PTS3
Silver medal – second place	2026 Pontevedra	PTS3
Bronze medal – third place	2016 Rotterdam	PT3
Bronze medal – third place	2025 Wollongong	PTS3
European Championships
Gold medal – first place	2017 Kitzbühel	PTS3
Gold medal – first place	2018 Tartu	PTS3
Gold medal – first place	2019 Valencia	PTS3
Gold medal – first place	2021 Valencia	PTS3
Gold medal – first place	2022 Olsztyn	PTS3
Gold medal – first place	2023 Madrid	PTS3
Gold medal – first place	2024 Vichy	PTS3
Bronze medal – third place	2014 Kitzbühel	PT3
Bronze medal – third place	2015 Geneva	PT3
Bronze medal – third place	2025 Besançon	PTS3
Men's para-aquathlon
World Championships
Silver medal – second place	2012 Auckland	TRI 5
Gold medal – first place	2013 London	TRI 2
Gold medal – first place	2015 Chicago	PT3
Men's para-duathlon
World Championships
Gold medal – first place	2019 Pontevedra	PTS3

Daniel Molina Martínez (born 15 September 1974) is a Spanish para-triathlete and swimmer. He won the PTS3 European Championship in 2017, 2018, 2019, 2021, 2022 and 2023, PTS3 World Championship in 2017, 2018, 2019, 2022 and 2023. He won a gold medal at the 2024 Summer Paralympics in the Men's PTS3. He also competed in the 2004 Summer Paralympics as a swimmer.

== Biography ==
Molina made his Paralympic debut in the 2004, in the 100 metre backstroke, where he finished in last place in Heat 1.

At the 2024 Summer Paralympics, Molina won the gold medal in his category.

Molina is the cousin of modern pentathletes Jorge and Eduardo Quesada. both in whom competed in the 1988 Summer Olympics. He is married to Carolina and they have two sons.
