= Max Gelhaar =

German paralympic triathlete

Personal information
- Born: 26 September 1997 (age 28) Schkeuditz, Germany

Sport
- Country: Germany
- Sport: Paratriathlon
- Club: LBRS Leipzig e.V.
Medal record
Paratriathlon
Representing Germany
Paralympic Games
Silver medal – second place	2024 Paris	PTS3
World Championships
Silver medal – second place	2023 Ponteverde	PTS3
Bronze medal – third place	2017 Rotterdam	PTS3
Bronze medal – third place	2018 Gold Coast	PTS3
Bronze medal – third place	2022 Abu Dhabi	PTS3
Bronze medal – third place	2024 Torremolinos	PTS3
European Championships
Silver medal – second place	2024 Vichy	PTS3
Silver medal – second place	2025 Besançon	PTS3
Bronze medal – third place	2023 Madrid	PTS3

Max Gelhaar (born 26 September 1997) is a German paralympic triathlete. He competed at the 2024 Summer Paralympics, winning the silver medal in the men's PTS3 event.
