= Nico van der Burgt =

Dutch paratriathlete (born 1983)

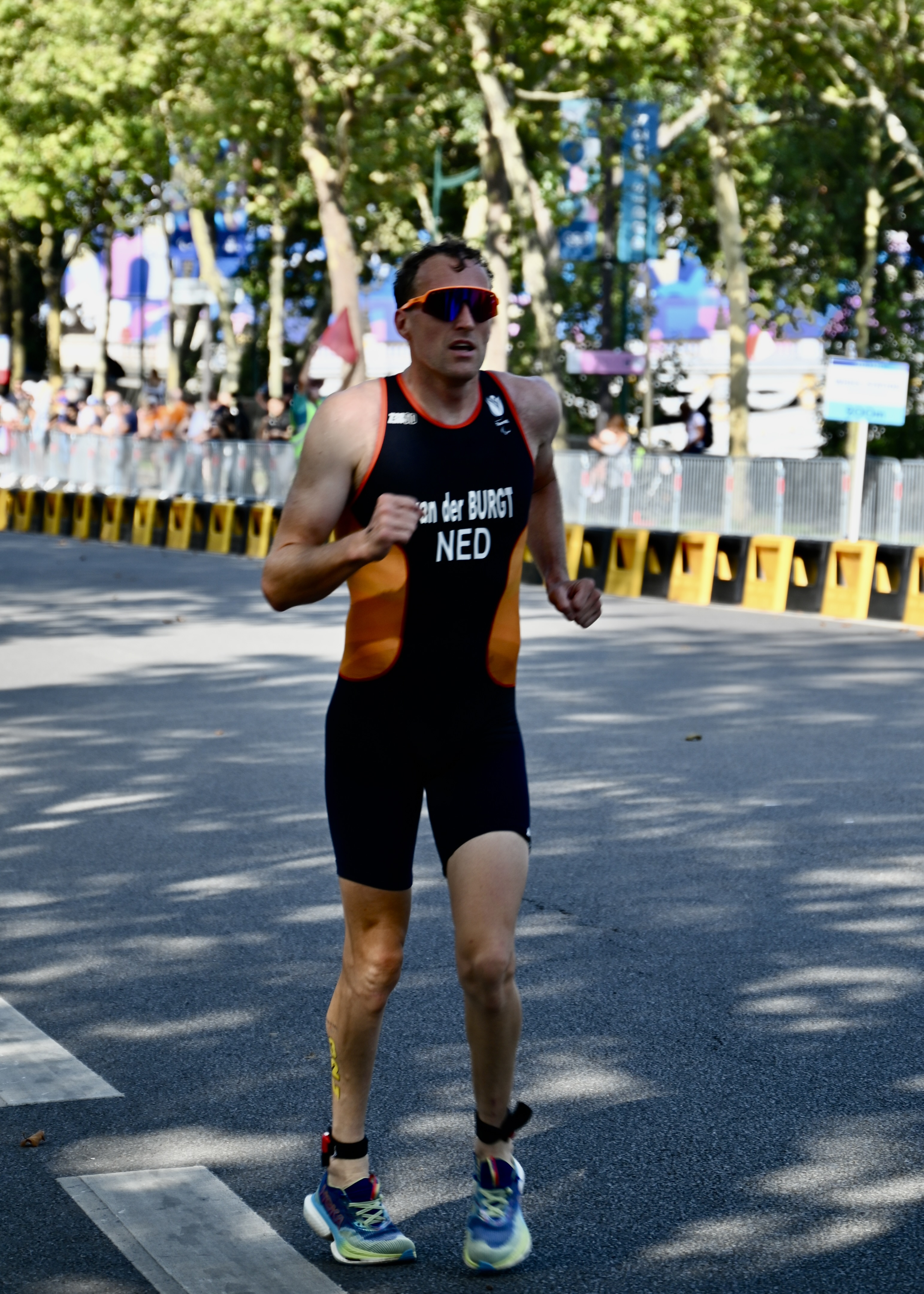
- Nico van der Burgt at the 2024 Summer Paralympics

Personal information
- Born: 25 November 1983 (age 42)
- Home town: Utrecht, Netherlands

Sport
- Sport: Paratriathlon
- Disability class: PTS3
Medal record
Men's paratriathlon
Representing Netherlands
Paralympic Games
Bronze medal – third place	2024 Paris	PTS3
World Championships
Silver medal – second place	2019 Lausanne	PTS3
Bronze medal – third place	2021 Abu Dhabi	PTS3
European Championships
Silver medal – second place	2019 Valencia	PTS3
Silver medal – second place	2021 Valencia	PTS3
Silver medal – second place	2022 Olsztyn	PTS3
Silver medal – second place	2023 Madrid	PTS3

Nico van der Burgt (born 25 November 1983) is a Dutch paratriathlete. He represented the Netherlands at the 2024 Summer Paralympics.

== Career ==
Van der Burgt represented the Netherlands at the 2024 Summer Paralympics and won a bronze medal in the PTS3 event.
