= Jean Paul Montanus =

Dutch paralympic table tennis player

Personal information
- Born: November 24, 1992 (age 33) Alkmaar, Netherlands

Sport
- Country: Netherlands
- Sport: Table tennis
Medal record
Table tennis
Representing Netherlands
Paralympic Games
Bronze medal – third place	2024 Paris	Individual C7

Jean Paul Montanus (born November 24, 1992) is a Dutch paralympic table tennis player. He competed at the 2024 Summer Paralympics, winning the bronze medal in the men's individual C7 event.
