= Great Britain at the 2024 Summer Paralympics =

- IPC code: GBR
- NPC: Paralympics GB

in Paris August 28, 2024 – September 8, 2024
- Competitors: 215 in 19 sports
- Flag bearers (opening): Terry Bywater; Lucy Shuker
- Flag bearers (closing): Matt Bush; Poppy Maskill
- Medals Ranked 2nd: Gold 49 Silver 44 Bronze 31 Total 124

Summer Paralympics appearances (overview)
- 1960; 1964; 1968; 1972; 1976; 1980; 1984; 1988; 1992; 1996; 2000; 2004; 2008; 2012; 2016; 2020; 2024

Great Britain competed at the 2024 Summer Paralympics in Paris, France, from 28 August to 8 September 2024. This was Great Britain's seventeenth consecutive time competing at the Summer Paralympic Games since the first Games in 1960. UK Sport set the team a target of winning between 100 and 140 medals at the event.

The team was made up of athletes from the whole United Kingdom including Northern Ireland (whose people may elect to hold Irish citizenship and are able to be selected to represent either Great Britain or Ireland at the Paralympics). Additionally some British overseas territories compete separately from Britain in Paralympic competition. British media celebrated "Super Sunday" on Day 4 of the Paralympics, when 18 medals, 12 of which were gold, were won by British athletes.

== Medallists ==
The following competitors won medals at the Games for Great Britain.

Medal	Name	Sport	Event	Date
Gold	Tully Kearney	Swimming	Women's 200 m freestyle S5	29 August
Gold	Poppy Maskill	Swimming	Women's 100 m butterfly S14	29 August
Gold	Jaco van Gass	Cycling	Men's individual pursuit C3	30 August
Gold	Elizabeth Jordan piloted by Dannielle Khan	Cycling	Women's pursuit B	30 August
Gold	Tully Kearney	Swimming	Women's 100 m freestyle S5	30 August
Gold	Maisie Summers-Newton	Swimming	Women's 200 m individual medley SM6	30 August
Gold	Stephen Clegg	Swimming	Men's 100 m backstroke S12	31 August
Gold	William Ellard	Swimming	Men's 200 m freestyle S14	31 August
Gold	Alice Tai	Swimming	Women's 100 m backstroke S8	31 August
Gold	Amy Truesdale	Taekwondo	Women's +65 kg	31 August
Gold	Matt Bush	Taekwondo	Men's +80kg	31 August
Gold	Benjamin Pritchard	Rowing	PR1 men's single sculls	1 September
Gold	Lauren Rowles; Gregg Stevenson	Rowing	PR2 mixed double sculls	1 September
Gold	Francesca Allen; Giedrė Rakauskaitė; Josh O'Brien; Ed Fuller; Erin Kennedy	Rowing	PR3 mixed coxed four	1 September
Gold	James Ball piloted by Steffan Lloyd	Cycling	Men's time trial B	1 September
Gold	Sophie Unwin piloted by Jenny Holl	Cycling	Women's pursuit B	1 September
Gold	Kadeena Cox; Jaco van Gass; Jody Cundy	Cycling	Mixed team sprint C1–5	1 September
Gold	Maisie Summers-Newton	Swimming	Women's 100 m breaststroke SB6	1 September
Gold	Brock Whiston	Swimming	Women's 200 m individual medley SM8	1 September
Gold	Hannah Cockroft	Athletics	Women's 100 m T34	1 September
Gold	Grace Harvey	Swimming	Women's 100 m breaststroke SB5	1 September
Gold	Sabrina Fortune	Athletics	Women's shot put F20	1 September
Gold	William Ellard; Rhys Darbey; Poppy Maskill; Olivia Newman-Baronius	Swimming	Mixed 4x100 m freestyle relay S14	1 September
Gold	Dave Ellis; Guide: Luke Pollard	Paratriathlon	Men's PTVI	2 September
Gold	Megan Richter	Paratriathlon	Women's PTS4	2 September
Gold	Stephen McGuire	Boccia	Men's individual BC4	2 September
Gold	Ellie Challis	Swimming	Women's 50 m breaststroke S3	2 September
Gold	Louise Fiddes	Swimming	Women's 100 m breaststroke SB14	2 September
Gold	Jodie Grinham; Nathan MacQueen	Archery	Mixed team compound open	2 September
Gold	Faye Rogers	Swimming	Women's 100 m butterfly S10	3 September
Gold	Sarah Storey	Cycling	Women's road time trial C5	4 September
Gold	Dimitri Coutya	Wheelchair Fencing	Men's foil B	4 September
Gold	Sammi Kinghorn	Athletics	Women's 100 m T53	4 September
Gold	Rebecca Redfern	Swimming	Women's 100 m breaststroke SB13	5 September
Gold	Alice Tai	Swimming	Women's 50 m freestyle S8	5 September
Gold	Dan Pembroke	Athletics	Men's javelin throw F13	5 September
Gold	Ben Sandilands	Athletics	Men's 1500 m T20	6 September
Gold	Sarah Storey	Cycling	Women's road race C4-5	6 September
Gold	Sophie Unwin piloted by Jenny Holl	Cycling	Women's road race B	6 September
Gold	Alfie Hewett; Gordon Reid	Wheelchair tennis	Men's doubles	6 September
Gold	Poppy Maskill	Swimming	Women's 100 m backstroke S14	6 September
Gold	Dimitri Coutya	Wheelchair Fencing	Men's épée B	6 September
Gold	Finlay Graham	Cycling	Men's road race C1–3	7 September
Gold	Emma Wiggs	Paracanoeing	Women's VL2	7 September
Gold	Charlotte Henshaw	Paracanoeing	Women's VL3	7 September
Gold	Stephen Clegg	Swimming	Men's 100 m butterfly S12	7 September
Gold	Hannah Cockroft	Athletics	Women's 800 m T34	7 September
Gold	Charlotte Henshaw	Paracanoeing	Women's KL2	8 September
Gold	Laura Sugar	Paracanoeing	Women's KL3	8 September
Silver	Daphne Schrager	Cycling	Women's individual pursuit C1-3	29 August
Silver	Stephen Bate piloted by Chris Latham	Cycling	Men's pursuit B	29 August
Silver	William Ellard	Swimming	Men's 100 m butterfly S14	29 August
Silver	Blaine Hunt	Cycling	Men's C4-5 Time-Trial	30 August
Silver	Finlay Graham	Cycling	Men's individual pursuit C3	30 August
Silver	Brock Whiston	Swimming	Women's 100 metre breaststroke SB8	30 August
Silver	Archie Atkinson	Cycling	Men's individual pursuit C4	31 August
Silver	Poppy Maskill	Swimming	Women's 200 m freestyle S14	31 August
Silver	Sam Murray; Annie Caddick	Rowing	PR3 mixed double sculls	1 September
Silver	Neil Fachie piloted by Matt Rotherham	Cycling	Men's time trial B	1 September
Silver	Samantha Kinghorn	Athletics	Women's 800 m T53	1 September
Silver	Kare Adenegan	Athletics	Women's 100 m T34	1 September
Silver	Daniel Bethell	Badminton	Men's singles SL3	2 September
Silver	Claire Cashmore	Paratriathlon	Women's PTS5	2 September
Silver	Krysten Coombs	Badminton	Men's singles SH6	2 September
Silver	Samantha Kinghorn	Athletics	Women's 1500 m T53	3 September
Silver	Callie-Ann Warrington	Swimming	Women's 100 m butterfly S10	3 September
Silver	Piers Gilliver	Wheelchair fencing	Men's sabre A	3 September
Silver	Frances Brown	Cycling	Women's road time trial C1-3	4 September
Silver	Sophie Unwin piloted by Jenny Holl	Cycling	Women's road time trial B	4 September
Silver	Rhys Darbey	Swimming	Men's 200 metre individual medley SM14	4 September
Silver	Poppy Maskill	Swimming	Women's 200 metre individual medley SM14	4 September
Silver	Andy Lapthorne; Greg Slade	Wheelchair tennis	Quad doubles	4 September
Silver	Zoe Newson	Powerlifting	Women's up to 45kg	4 September
Silver	Alice Tai	Swimming	Women's 400 metre freestyle S8	4 September
Silver	Iona Winnifrith	Swimming	Women's 100 metre breaststroke SB7	5 September
Silver	Samantha Kinghorn	Athletics	Women's 400 m T53	5 September
Silver	Mark Swan	Powerlifting	Men's up to 65kg	5 September
Silver	Oliver Lam-Watson; Piers Gilliver; Dimitri Coutya	Wheelchair fencing	Men's team foil	5 September
Silver	Marcus Perrineau-Daley	Athletics	Men's 100 m T52	6 September
Silver	Rob Davies	Table tennis	Men's singles MS1	6 September
Silver	Will Bayley	Table tennis	Men's singles MS7	6 September
Silver	Zac Shaw; Jonnie Peacock; Ali Smith; Sammi Kinghorn	Athletics	Mixed 4 × 100 metres relay	6 September
Silver	Piers Gilliver	Wheelchair fencing	Men's épée A	6 September
Silver	David Phillipson	Paracanoeing	Men's KL2	7 September
Silver	Hope Gordon	Paracanoeing	Women's VL3	7 September
Silver	Georgia Wilson	Equestrian	Individual freestyle test grade II	7 September
Silver	Daniel Powell	Judo	Men's -90kg J1	7 September
Silver	Alfie Hewett	Wheelchair tennis	Men's singles	7 September
Silver	Kare Adenegan	Athletics	Women's 800 m T34	7 September
Silver	Aled Davies	Athletics	Men's shot put F63	7 September
Silver	Great Britain men's national wheelchair basketball team: Abdi Jama; Jim Palmer; Simon Brown; Kyle Marsh; Gregg Warburton; Harry Brown; Phil Pratt; Ben Fox; Peter Cusack; Lee Fryer; Lee Manning; Terry Bywater	Wheelchair basketball	Men's tournament	7 September
Silver	Emma Wiggs	Paracanoeing	Women's KL2	8 September
Silver	Jack Eyers	Paracanoeing	Men's VL3	8 September
Bronze	Felicity Pickard; Bly Twomey	Table tennis	Women's doubles WD14	29 August
Bronze	Matthew Robertson	Cycling	Men's individual pursuit C2	30 August
Bronze	Sophie Unwin piloted by Jenny Holl	Cycling	Women's pursuit B	30 August
Bronze	Paul Karabardak; Billy Shilton	Table tennis	Men's doubles MD14	31 August
Bronze	Louise Fiddes	Swimming	Women's 200 m freestyle S14	31 August
Bronze	Zac Shaw	Athletics	Men's 100 m T12	31 August
Bronze	Jodie Grinham	Archery	Women's individual compound open	31 August
Bronze	Lora Fachie piloted by Corrine Hall	Cycling	Women's pursuit B	1 September
Bronze	Alice Tai	Swimming	Women's 200 m individual medley SM8	1 September
Bronze	Lauren Steadman	Paratriathlon	Women's PTS5	2 September
Bronze	Hannah Moore	Paratriathlon	Women's PTS4	2 September
Bronze	Natasha Baker	Equestrian	Individual championship test grade III	3 September
Bronze	Georgia Wilson	Equestrian	Individual championship test grade II	3 September
Bronze	Tim Jeffery	Shooting	R9 – 50 m rifle prone SH2	4 September
Bronze	Sophie Wells	Equestrian	Individual event grade V	4 September
Bronze	Lora Fachie piloted by Corrine Hall	Cycling	Women's road time trial B	4 September
Bronze	Anna Nicholson	Athletics	Women's shot put F35	5 September
Bronze	Bly Twomey	Table tennis	Women's singles WS7	5 September
Bronze	Olivia Broome	Powerlifting	Women's up to 50kg	5 September
Bronze	Lora Fachie piloted by Corrine Hall	Cycling	Women's road race B	6 September
Bronze	Maisie Summers-Newton	Swimming	Women's 400 m freestyle S6	6 September
Bronze	Mark Tompsett	Swimming	Men's 100 m backstroke S14	6 September
Bronze	Olivia Newman-Baronius	Swimming	Women's 100 m backstroke S14	6 September
Bronze	Hollie Arnold	Athletics	Women's javelin F46	6 September
Bronze	Sophie Wells	Equestrian	Individual freestyle test grade V	7 September
Bronze	Mari Durward-Akhurst	Equestrian	Individual freestyle test grade I	7 September
Bronze	Natasha Baker	Equestrian	Individual freestyle test grade III	7 September
Bronze	Alice Tai	Swimming	Women's 200 m butterfly S8	7 September
Bronze	Oliver Lam-Watson; Piers Gilliver; Dimitri Coutya	Wheelchair fencing	Men's team épée	7 September
Bronze	Chris Skelley	Judo	Men +90kg J2	7 September
Bronze	Ndidikama Okoh	Athletics	Women's 100 m T63	7 September

=== Medals by sport ===
Medals by sport
Sport	Gold medal	Silver medal	Bronze medal	Total
Swimming	18	8	6	32
Cycling	9	8	5	22
Athletics	6	8	4	18
Paracanoeing	4	4	0	8
Rowing	3	1	0	4
Wheelchair Fencing	2	3	1	6
Paratriathlon	2	1	2	5
Taekwondo	2	0	0	2
Wheelchair Tennis	1	2	0	3
Archery	1	0	1	2
Boccia	1	0	0	1
Table tennis	0	2	3	5
Powerlifting	0	2	1	3
Badminton	0	2	0	2
Equestrian	0	1	6	7
Judo	0	1	1	2
Wheelchair Basketball	0	1	0	1
Shooting	0	0	1	1
Total	49	44	31	124

=== Medals by date ===
Medals by date
Day	Date	Gold medal	Silver medal	Bronze medal	Total
1	29 Aug	2	3	1	6
2	30 Aug	4	3	2	9
3	31 Aug	5	2	4	11
4	01 Sept	12	4	2	18
5	02 Sept	6	3	2	11
6	03 Sept	1	3	2	6
7	04 Sept	3	7	3	13
8	05 Sept	3	4	3	10
9	06 Sept	6	5	5	16
10	07 Sept	5	8	7	20
11	08 Sept	2	2	0	4
Total		49	44	31	124

=== Medals by gender ===
Medals by gender^{(Comparison graphs)}
Gender	Gold medal	Silver medal	Bronze medal	Total	Percentage
Female	29	19	24	72	58.06%
Male	15	23	7	45	36.29%
Mixed	5	2	0	7	5.65%
Total	49	44	31	124	100%

=== Multiple medallists ===
Multiple medallists
Name	Sport	1st place, gold medalist(s)	2nd place, silver medalist(s)	3rd place, bronze medalist(s)	Total
Poppy Maskill	Swimming	3	2	0	5
Alice Tai	Swimming	2	1	2	5
Dimitri Coutya	Wheelchair Fencing	2	1	1	4
Sophie Unwin	Cycling	2	1	1	4
William Ellard	Swimming	2	1	0	3
Maisie Summers-Newton	Swimming	2	0	1	3
Stephen Clegg	Swimming	2	0	0	2
Hannah Cockroft	Athletics	2	0	0	2
Charlotte Henshaw	Paracanoeing	2	0	0	2
Tully Kearney	Swimming	2	0	0	2
Sarah Storey	Cycling	2	0	0	2
Jaco Van Gass	Cycling	2	0	0	2
Sammi Kinghorn	Athletics	1	4	0	5
Rhys Darbey	Swimming	1	1	0	2
Finlay Graham	Cycling	1	1	0	2
Alfie Hewett	Wheelchair Tennis	1	1	0	2
Brock Whiston	Swimming	1	1	0	2
Emma Wiggs	Paracanoeing	1	1	0	2
Louise Fiddes	Swimming	1	0	1	2
Jodie Grinham	Archery	1	0	1	2
Olivia Newman-Baronius	Swimming	1	0	1	2
Piers Gilliver	Wheelchair Fencing	0	3	1	4
Kare Adenegan	Athletics	0	2	0	2
Oliver Lam-Watson	Wheelchair Fencing	0	1	1	2
Zac Shaw	Athletics	0	1	1	2
Georgia Wilson	Equestrian	0	1	1	2
Lora Fachie	Cycling	0	0	3	3
Natasha Baker	Equestrian	0	0	2	2
Bly Twomey	Table Tennis	0	0	2	2
Sophie Wells	Equestrian	0	0	2	2

== Competitors ==
The following is a list of the number of competitors participating in the Games in each sport for Great Britain:

Sport	Men	Women	Total
Archery	1	3	4
Athletics	17	16	33
Badminton	3	1	4
Boccia	6	5	11
Cycling	13	10	23
Equestrian	0	4	4
Judo	3	0	3
Paracanoeing	4	5	9
Paratriathlon	7	7	14
Powerlifting	3	4	7
Rowing	5	5	10
Shooting	3	1	4
Swimming	9	18	27
Table tennis	8	3	11
Taekwondo	1	2	3
Wheelchair basketball	12	12	24
Wheelchair fencing	3	1	4
Wheelchair rugby	12	0	12
Wheelchair tennis	6	2	8
Total	116	99	215

Please note that guides in athletics and paratriathlon, ramp operators and sports assistants in boccia and pilots in cycling are counted as athletes at the Paralympics.

== Administration ==
On 4 March 2020, ParalympicsGB announced that Director of Sport Penny Briscoe would continue in the role of Chef de Mission, which she had undertaken at the previous three summer Paralympic Games for the British team. She also fulfilled the role at the 2014 and 2018 winter Paralympic Games.

== Archery ==
Great Britain secured a quota place in the mixed team compound event at the 2023 World Para Archery Championships in Plzeň, Czech Republic. This also earned places in the men's and women's individual events for the two selected archers. A second quota was gained in the women's individual compound competition. In addition a quota was achieved in the women's individual W1 category at the 2023 European Para Championships in Rotterdam, Netherlands. The squad was announced on 24 July 2024.

Men

Athlete	Event	Ranking round		Round of 32	Round of 16	Quarterfinals	Semifinals	Finals	
Athlete	Event	Score	Seed	Opposition score	Opposition score	Opposition score	Opposition score	Opposition score	Rank
Nathan MacQueen	Individual compound open	696	6	Doric (SVK); W 142–138	Nori (IRI); W 140–139	Stutzman (USA); L 142–143	Did not advance		=5

Women

Athlete	Event	Ranking Round		Round of 32	Round of 16	Quarterfinals	Semifinals	Finals	
Athlete	Event	Score	Seed	Opposition score	Opposition score	Opposition score	Opposition score	Opposition score	Rank
Victoria Kingstone	Individual W1	608	6	—N/a	Ferreira da Silva (BRA); W 128–77	Kim (KOR); L 122–128	Did not advance		=5
Jodie Grinham	Individual compound open	693	4	Bye	Markitantova (POL); W 142–141	Gögel (BRA); W 143–141	Cure Gurdi (TUR); L 143–145	Paterson Pine (GBR); W 142–141	3rd place, bronze medalist(s)
Phoebe Paterson Pine	Individual compound open	688	7	Gonzabay (ECU); W 142–141	Tanner (AUS); W 140–136	Zúñiga (CHI); W 143–138	Hemmati (IRI); L 143–146	Grinham (GBR); L 141–142	4

Mixed

Athlete	Event	Ranking Round		Round of 16	Quarterfinals	Semifinals	Finals	
Athlete	Event	Score	Seed	Opposition score	Opposition score	Opposition score	Opposition score	Rank
Nathan MacQueen; Jodie Grinham	Mixed team compound	1389	2	Bye	Australia (AUS); W 150–141	Italy (ITA); W156–149	Iran (IRI); W 155–151	1st place, gold medalist(s)

== Athletics ==
British track and field athletes achieved quota places for the following events based on their results at the 2023 World Championships, 2024 World Championships, or through high performance allocation, as long as they meet the minimum entry standard (MES). An NPC can enter an eligible athlete in an unlimited number of individual events within their classification (or, on occasion, in a higher classification if its open to lower classifications) - as long as the athlete has achieved an MES (minimal entry standard) performance in each respective event.

Paralympics GB announced the first tranche of ten athletes selected to compete in Paris on 21 June. The second and final tranche of 23 athletes was announced in 25 July. Dan Greaves and David Weir will both be competing at their seventh Games with Greaves seeking a seventh consecutive medal.

Key

- Note–Ranks given for track events are within the athlete's heat only
- Q = Qualified for the next round
- q = Qualified for the next round as a fastest loser or, in field events, by position without achieving the qualifying target
- DQ = Disqualified
- PR = Paralympic Record
- AR = Area (or continental) Record
- NR = National Record
- SB = Season's Best
- N/A = Round not applicable for the event
- Bye = Athlete not required to compete in round

Track & road events
Men

Athlete	Event	Heats		Final	
Athlete	Event	Result	Rank	Result	Rank
Nathan Maguire	400 m T54	45.47	1 Q	45.78	4
Nathan Maguire	800 m T54	1:35.93	2 Q	1:31.09	4
Nathan Maguire	1500 m T54	2:57.41	3 Q	2:53.76	5
Luke Nuttall	1500 m T46	—N/a		3:57.62	6
Jonnie Peacock	100 m T64	10.93	3 Q	10.91	5
Marcus Perrineau-Daley	100 m T52	16.87	2 Q	17.27	2nd place, silver medalist(s)
Ben Sandilands	1500 m T20	—N/a		3:45.40 WR	1st place, gold medalist(s)
Zac Shaw	100 m T12	11.15	1 Q	10.94	3rd place, bronze medalist(s)
Daniel Sidbury	400 m T54	48.05	6	Did not advance	
Daniel Sidbury	800 m T54	DNS		Did not advance	
Daniel Sidbury	1500 m T54	3:05.44	7	Did not advance	
Daniel Sidbury	5000 m T54	DNF		Did not advance	
Zak Skinner	100 m T13	10.97	3 Q	10.93	6
Isaac Towers	800 m T34	1:42.62	5 q	1:41.68	6
David Weir	1500 m T54	3:05.35	6	Did not advance	
David Weir	5000 m T54	11:17.91	1 Q	10:56.88	8
David Weir	Marathon T54	—N/a		1.33:27	5
Thomas Young	100 m T38	—N/a		11.00	4

Women

Athlete	Event	Heats		Final	
Athlete	Event	Result	Rank	Result	Rank
Karé Adenegan	100 m T34	17.87	1 Q	17.99	2nd place, silver medalist(s)
Karé Adenegan	800 m T34	—N/a		2:03.12	2nd place, silver medalist(s)
Fabienne André	100 m T34	19.03	2 Q	18.86	5
Fabienne André	800 m T34	—N/a		2:06.86	4
Olivia Breen	100 m T38	12.95	4	Did not advance	
Hannah Cockroft	100 m T34	17.12	1 Q	16.80	1st place, gold medalist(s)
Hannah Cockroft	800 m T34	—N/a		1:55.44	1st place, gold medalist(s)
Madeline Down	100 m T38	12.93	3 Q	13.02	8
Sophie Hahn	100 m T38	12.52	2 Q	12.88	6
Sammi Kinghorn	100 m T53	—N/a		15.64 PR	1st place, gold medalist(s)
Sammi Kinghorn	400 m T53	—N/a		53.45	2nd place, silver medalist(s)
Sammi Kinghorn	800 m T53	—N/a		1:42.96	2nd place, silver medalist(s)
Sammi Kinghorn	1500 m T54	3:34.83	2 Q	3:16.01	2nd place, silver medalist(s)
Didi Okoh	100 m T63	14.69	3 Q	14.59	3rd place, bronze medalist(s)
Eden Rainbow-Cooper	1500 m T54	3:29.44	7 qR	3:22.09	7
Eden Rainbow-Cooper	5000 m T54	12:23.53	5 Q	DNF	
Eden Rainbow-Cooper	Marathon T54	—N/a		DNF	
Ali Smith	400 m T38	1:01.06	4 Q	1:00.88	6
Hannah Taunton	1500 m T20	—N/a		4:38.98	5
Melanie Woods	400 m T54	55.47	3 Q	55.39	6
Melanie Woods	800 m T54	1:45.81	3 Q	1:43.85	6
Melanie Woods	1500 m T54	3:20.70	5 Q	3:23.37	8

Mixed

Athlete	Event	Heats		Final	
Athlete	Event	Result	Rank	Result	Rank
Sammi Kinghorn; Jonnie Peacock; Zac Shaw; Ali Smith	4 × 100 metres relay	46.61	2 q	46.01	(silver) AR

Field events
Men

Athlete	Event	Final	
Athlete	Event	Distance/ height	Rank
Jonathan Broom-Edwards	High jump T64	1.89	5
Karim Chan	Long jump T38	6.39	4
Aled Davies	Shot put F63	15.10	2nd place, silver medalist(s)
Dan Greaves	Discus throw F64	53.50	6
Dan Pembroke	Javelin throw F13	74.49 WR	1st place, gold medalist(s)
Zak Skinner	Long jump T13	6.83	4
Harrison Walsh	Discus throw F64	50.44	7

Women

Athlete	Event	Final	
Athlete	Event	Distance/ height	Rank
Hollie Arnold	Javelin throw F46	40.59	3rd place, bronze medalist(s)
Olivia Breen	Long jump T38	4.99	4
Madeline Down	Long jump T38	4.81	6
Sabrina Fortune	Shot put F20	15.12 WR	1st place, gold medalist(s)
Anna Nicholson	Shot put F35	9.44	3rd place, bronze medalist(s)
Funmi Oduwaiye	Discus throw F64	33.32	8
Funmi Oduwaiye	Shot put F64	11.27	5

== Badminton ==
Great Britain has qualified three para badminton players for the following events, through the release of BWF para-badminton Race to Paris Paralympic Ranking. A fourth player was added by selection. The squad was announced on 10 June 2024.

Athlete	Event	Group Stage				Quarterfinal	Semifinal	Final / BM	
Athlete	Event	Opposition Score	Opposition Score	Opposition Score	Rank	Opposition Score	Opposition Score	Opposition Score	Rank
Daniel Bethell	Men's singles SL3	Czyz (NZL); W (21–5, 21–2)	Fujihara (JPN); W (21–9, 21–4)	Chyrkov (UKR); W (21–5, 21–5)	1 Q	—N/a	Bunsun (THA); W (21–7, 21-9)	Kumar (IND); L (14–21, 21–18, 21–23)	2nd place, silver medalist(s)
Krysten Coombs	Men's singles SH6	Chu (HKG); L (13–21, 21–19, 15–21)	Subhan (INA); W (21–15, 17–21, 21–18)	Solaimalai (IND); W (21–12, 21–10)	2 Q	Meechai (THA); W (21–15, 18–21, 21–11)	Chu (HKG); W (21–19, 21–14)	Noakes (FRA); L (19–21, 13–21)	2nd place, silver medalist(s)
Jack Shephard	Men's singles SH6	Lin (CHN); L (17-21, 13-21)	Tavares (BRA); W (21–19, 15–21, 21–19)	Noakes (FRA); L (17–21, 17–21)	4	Did not advance			=7
Rachel Choong	Women's singles SH6	Vargas (PER); W (14–21, 21–19, 21–17)	Szmigiel (POL); W (17–21, 21–10, 21–16)	—N/a	1 Q	Marlina (INA); L (7–21, 11–21)	Did not advance		=5
Jack Shephard; Rachel Choong	Mixed doubles SH6	Subhan / Marlina (INA); L (14–21, 12–21)	Li / Lin (CHN); L (11–21, 7–21)	—N/a	3	Did not advance			=5

== Boccia ==
Great Britain secured a place in the mixed BC1-2 team event based on the rankings at 31 December 2023. This also guaranteed places in the individual competitions for the 3 team members. The Great Britain BC3 pair qualified - to compete as a pair and also generating one individual place in the male and female BC3 events - via winning gold at the Paralympic Qualification Tournament held in Coimbra, Portugal. Additional places in the men's BC3 and BC4 individual events were gained via bipartite invitations. The team was announced on 12 June 2024.

Athlete	Event	Pool matches				Quarterfinals	Semifinals	Final / BM	
Athlete	Event	Opposition Score	Opposition Score	Opposition Score	Rank	Opposition Score	Opposition Score	Opposition Score	Rank
David Smith	Men's individual BC1	Oliveira (BRA); W 5–2	Perez (NED); W 4–1	—N/a	1 Q	Král (SVK); W 6–1	Jung S-j (KOR); L 3–4	Syafa (INA); L 3–5	4
Will Arnott	Men's individual BC3	Wilson (GBR); L 3–5	Morapedi (RSA); W 7–1	Michel (AUS); L 2–3	3	Did not advance			9
Patrick Wilson	Men's individual BC3	Arnott (GBR); W 5–3	Michel (AUS); L 2–7	Morapedi (RSA); W 9–0	2 Q	Iskrzycki (POL); L 1–4	Did not advance		6
Stephen McGuire	Men's individual BC4	Abdul Rahman (MAS); W 8–0	Kolinko (UKR); W 7–1	Ciobanu (CAN); L 2–4	1 Q	Leung (HKG); W 6–1	Komar (CRO); W 5–3	Chica (COL); W 8–5	1st place, gold medalist(s)
Claire Taggart	Women's individual BC2	León (ECU); W 10–1	Gonçalves (POR); L 3–4	—N/a	2 Q	Yeung (HKG); W 3–2	Jeong S-y (KOR); L 2–3	Zayana (INA); L 2–5	4
Kayleigh Haggo	Women's individual BC2	Jeong S-y (KOR); L 1–3	Correia (POR); W 6–2	—N/a	2 Q	Zayana (INA); L 2–8	Did not advance		8
Sally Kidson	Women's individual BC3	Oliveira (BRA); W 5–1	Leeson (AUS); L 1–6	Kang S-h (KOR); L 0–7	3	Did not advance			11
Will Arnott; Sally Kidson	Mixed pairs BC3	South Korea; L 2–6	Thailand; L 0–7	—N/a	3	Did not advance			11
David Smith; Claire Taggart; Kayleigh Haggo	Mixed team BC1/BC2	China; L 1–13	Portugal; W 5–4	—N/a	2 Q	Indonesia; L 7–7*	Did not advance		5

== Cycling ==
Great Britain has qualified 16 para-cyclists (ten men and six women, not including pilots) based on the UCI Nations Rankings for 2024. The UCI have also confirmed that one as yet unnamed paracyclist has gained a bipartite invitation for a total of seventeen athletes.

The cycling squad was announced on 22 July 2024. The team included seven defending Paralympic champions including eight time Paralympian Jody Cundy and Dame Sarah Storey who will be competing at a record breaking ninth Games for a British athlete. Six pilot paracyclists were included for a total of 23 entrants.

Road

Athlete	Event	Time	Rank
Steve Bate piloted by Chris Latham	Men's road race B	DNS	
Steve Bate piloted by Chris Latham	Men's time trial B	35:17.10	5
Matthew Robertson	Men's road race C1-3	1:50:31	7
Matthew Robertson	Men's time trial C2	20:52.15	5
Fin Graham	Men's road race C1-3	1:43:19	1st place, gold medalist(s)
Fin Graham	Men's time trial C3	39:39.46	6
Jaco van Gass	Men's road race C1-3	1:47:14	6
Jaco van Gass	Men's time trial C3	44:19.48	8
Ben Watson	Men's road race C1-3	1:47:14	5
Ben Watson	Men's time trial C3	39:22.90	4
Archie Atkinson	Men's road race C4-5	DNF	
Archie Atkinson	Men's time trial C4	38:23.52	5
Blaine Hunt	Men's road race C4-5	DNF	
Lora Fachie piloted by Corrine Hall	Women's road race B	2:39:01	3rd place, bronze medalist(s)
Lora Fachie piloted by Corrine Hall	Women's time trial B	40:41.30	3rd place, bronze medalist(s)
Lizzi Jordan piloted by Danni Khan	Women's road race B	2:50:41	7
Lizzi Jordan piloted by Danni Khan	Women's time trial B	42:59.54	6
Sophie Unwin piloted by Jenny Holl	Women's road race B	2:37:26	1st place, gold medalist(s)
Sophie Unwin piloted by Jenny Holl	Women's time trial B	39:40.18	2nd place, silver medalist(s)
Fran Brown	Women's road race C1-3	1:43:17	7
Fran Brown	Women's time trial C1-3	21:46.18	2nd place, silver medalist(s)
Daphne Schrager	Women's road race C1-3	1:43:14	6
Daphne Schrager	Women's time trial C1-3	22:15.91	5
Sarah Storey	Women's road race C4-5	1:54:24	1st place, gold medalist(s)
Sarah Storey	Women's time trial C5	20:22.15	1st place, gold medalist(s)

Track

Athlete	Event	Qualification		Final	
Athlete	Event	Time	Rank	Opposition Time	Rank
James Ball piloted by Steffan Lloyd	Men's 1000 m time trial B	59.793	2 Q	58.964	1st place, gold medalist(s)
James Ball piloted by Steffan Lloyd	Men's individual pursuit B	6:17.368	15	Did not advance	
Steve Bate piloted by Chris Latham	Men's individual pursuit B	3:56.435 WR	2 QG	3:57.652	2nd place, silver medalist(s)
Neil Fachie piloted by Matt Rotherham	Men's 1000 m time trial B	1:00.543	4 Q	59..312	2nd place, silver medalist(s)
Neil Fachie piloted by Matt Rotherham	Men's individual pursuit B	5:33.221	13	Did not advance	
Fin Graham	Men's individual pursuit C3	3:17.305 WR	2 QG	3:22.540	2nd place, silver medalist(s)
Jaco van Gass	Men's 1000 m time trial C1–3	1:05.083 WR †	4 Q	1:04.825	4
Jaco van Gass	Men's individual pursuit C3	3:15.488 WR	1 QG	3:18.460	1st place, gold medalist(s)
Matthew Robertson	Men's individual pursuit C2	3:28.373	3 QB	3:30.508	3rd place, bronze medalist(s)
Archie Atkinson	Men's 1000 m time trial C4–5	1:03.508	5 Q	1:03.538	5
Archie Atkinson	Men's individual pursuit C4	4:17.70 WR	1 QG	Did not finish	2nd place, silver medalist(s)
Jody Cundy	Men's 1000 m time trial C4–5	1:02.384	4 Q	1:02.504	4
Blaine Hunt	Men's 1000 m time trial C4–5	1:02.005	2 Q	1:01.776	2nd place, silver medalist(s)
Blaine Hunt	Men's individual pursuit C5	4:23.961	7	Did not advance	
Lora Fachie piloted by Corrine Hall	Women's 1000 m time trial B	1:09.018	4 Q	1:09.181	4
Lora Fachie piloted by Corrine Hall	Women's individual pursuit B	3:22.390	3 QB	3:20.488	3rd place, bronze medalist(s)
Lizzi Jordan piloted by Danni Khan	Women's 1000 m time trial B	1:06.870	1 Q	1:07.533	1st place, gold medalist(s)
Lizzi Jordan piloted by Danni Khan	Women's individual pursuit B	3:23.192	4 QB	3:25.430	4
Sophie Unwin piloted by Jenny Holl	Women's 1000 m time trial B	1:07.719	3 Q	1:07.879	3rd place, bronze medalist(s)
Sophie Unwin piloted by Jenny Holl	Women's individual pursuit B	3:17.643 WR	1 QG	3:19.149	1st place, gold medalist(s)
Fran Brown	Women's 500 m time trial C1–3	39.481	8	Did not advance	
Daphne Schrager	Women's individual pursuit C1–3	3:45.133 WR	2 QG	3:51.129	2nd place, silver medalist(s)
Kadeena Cox	Women's 500 m time trial C4-5	35.436	2 Q	Did not finish	6
Kadeena Cox; Jaco van Gass; Jody Cundy	Mixed team sprint	48.493	1 QG	47.738	1st place, gold medalist(s)

† The Men's 1000 metres C1-3 time trial is a factored event. Although finishing 4th after factoring, Jaco van Gass's time is recognised as a world record in his C3 classification.

== Equestrian ==
Great Britain has qualified 4 riders for the team event after finishing in fourth place at the 2022 FEI World Equestrian Games. The team was announced on 18 July 2024.

Individual

Athlete	Horse	Event	Total	
Athlete	Horse	Event	Score	Rank
Mari Durward-Akhurst	Athene Lindebjerg	Individual championship test grade I	71.792	6 Q
Mari Durward-Akhurst	Athene Lindebjerg	Individual freestyle test grade I	77.747	3rd place, bronze medalist(s)
Georgia Wilson	Sakura	Individual championship test grade II	73.414	(bronze) Q
Georgia Wilson	Sakura	Individual freestyle test grade II	79.374	2nd place, silver medalist(s)
Natasha Baker	Keystone Dawn Chorus	Individual championship test grade III	73.167	(bronze) Q
Natasha Baker	Keystone Dawn Chorus	Individual freestyle test grade III	77.140	3rd place, bronze medalist(s)
Sophie Wells	Egebjerggards Samoa	Individual championship test grade V	72.257	(bronze) Q
Sophie Wells	Egebjerggards Samoa	Individual freestyle test grade V	75.445	3rd place, bronze medalist(s)

Team

Athlete	Horse	Event	Individual score	Total	
Athlete	Horse	Event	TT	Score	Rank
Natasha Baker	See above	Team	75.367	219.562	6
Sophie Wells	See above	Team	70.895	219.562	6
Georgia Wilson	See above	Team	73.300	219.562	6

== Judo ==
Great Britain qualified three judokas by virtue of their rankings when the qualifying period ended on 24 June 2024. Their selection was confirmed on 22 July.

Athlete	Event	Preliminaries	Quarterfinals	Semifinals	Repechage First round	Repechage Final	Final / BM	
Athlete	Event	Opposition Result	Opposition Result	Opposition Result	Opposition Result	Opposition Result	Opposition Result	Rank
Daniel Powell	Men's −90 kg J1	Bye	Gholamishafia (IRI); W 10–0	Jonard (FRA); W 1–0	—N/a		Cavalcante (BRA); L 0–10	2nd place, silver medalist(s)
Evan Malloy	Men's −90 kg J2	Bye	de Azevedo (BRA); L 0–1	Did not advance	Kizilashvili (GEO); L 0–11	Did not advance		=7
Chris Skelley	Men's +90 kg J2	—N/a	Zorgani (FRA); W 10–0	Bölükbaşı (TUR); L 0–1	—N/a		Mantolas (INA); W 10–0	3rd place, bronze medalist(s)

== Paracanoeing ==
Great Britain earned quota places for the following events through the 2023 ICF Canoe Sprint World Championships in Duisburg, Germany and the 2024 ICF Paracanoe World Championships in Hungary.

While each nation may only gain one quota place per event, a canoeist who gains such a quota can contest both events in their classification, meaning Great Britain can enter two canoeists in eight of the events, having won separate quota places in the kayak and outrigger events in the Men's L2 and L3, and Women's L2 and L3 classifications.

On 1 July 2024, Great Britain announced a team of nine canoeists including Jeanette Chippington who will be competing at her eighth Games having debuted in swimming at Seoul in 1988.

Athlete	Event	Heats		Semifinal		Final	
Athlete	Event	Time	Rank	Time	Rank	Time	Rank
Dave Phillipson	Men's KL2	43.90	3 SF	43.79	1 FA	42.43	2nd place, silver medalist(s)
Rob Oliver	Men's KL3	42.35	2 SF	42.32	5 FA	40.82	6
Ed Clifton	Men's VL2	56.30	2 SF	57.78	3 FA	54.78	7
Jack Eyers	Men's VL3	50.24	3 SF	48.59	1 FA	47.87	2nd place, silver medalist(s)
Jeanette Chippington	Women's KL1	1:03.18	4 SF	58.71	3 FA	1:01.19	7
Jeanette Chippington	Women's VL2	1:03.69	2 SF	1:02.65	1 FA	1:02.41	4
Charlotte Henshaw	Women's KL2	51.00	1 FA	—N/a		49.07	1st place, gold medalist(s)
Charlotte Henshaw	Women's VL3	58.33	1 FA	—N/a		55.70	1st place, gold medalist(s)
Emma Wiggs	Women's KL2	52.74	2 SF	57.73	2 FA	51.56	2nd place, silver medalist(s)
Emma Wiggs	Women's VL2	1:00.95	1 FA	—N/a		58.88	1st place, gold medalist(s)
Hope Gordon	Women's KL3	48.96	2 SF	48.82	1 FA	49.11	5
Hope Gordon	Women's VL3	58.25	1 FA	—N/a		56.58	2nd place, silver medalist(s)
Laura Sugar	Women's KL3	48.14	1 FA	—N/a		46.66	1st place, gold medalist(s)

== Paratriathlon ==
Ten triathletes earned quota places for Great Britain in paratriathlon at the 2024 Summer Paralympics.by having a top nine ranking in the World Paratriathlon rankings for their classification on 1 July 2024. In addition a further place was granted to Finley Jakes via a bipartite invitation. The squad of eleven athletes and three guides was announced on 23 July.

Athlete	Event	Swim	Trans 1	Bike	Trans 2	Run	Total time	Rank
Henry Urand	Men's PTS3	15.49	1.10	32.55	1.01	19.29	1:10.24	4
Finley Jakes	Men's PTS4	11.58	1.12	33.28	0.44	18.46	1:06.08	11
Michael Taylor	Men's PTS4	9.47	1.13	32.09	0.36	19.21	1:03.06	6
Dave Ellis (Guide – Luke Pollard)	Men's PTVI	12.51	0.51	28.11	0.30	16.18	58.41	1st place, gold medalist(s)
Oscar Kelly (Guide - Charlie Harding)	Men's PTVI	13.34	0.49	29.20	0.34	17.31	1:01.48	7
Melissa Nichols	Women's PTWC	15.06	1.54	42.03	0.48	14.52	1:14.43	8
Megan Richter	Women's PTS4	13.57	1.21	35.48	0.49	22.35	1:14.30	1st place, gold medalist(s)
Hannah Moore	Women's PTS4	11.52	1.34	35.47	0.57	25.51	1:16.01	3rd place, bronze medalist(s)
Claire Cashmore	Women's PTS5	11.33	1.03	33.10	0.37	19.32	1:05.55	2nd place, silver medalist(s)
Lauren Steadman	Women's PTS5	11.47	1.05	32.47	0.41	20.25	1:06.45	3rd place, bronze medalist(s)
Alison Peasgood (Guide – Brooke Gillies)	Women's PTVI	15.38	1.05	31.31	0.41	20.26	1:09.21	4

== Powerlifting ==
Great Britain secured six quotas by virtue of the world rankings when the qualifying period ended on 26 June 2024. Four of the lifters achieved qualification at two weights and had to decide which of these they would compete in at the Games. As a result of Olivia Broome's decision to compete in the women's –50 kg class a spot was released for Lottie McGuinness in the –55 kg class as the next eligible athlete in the rankings. The squad was announced on 25 July.

Athlete	Event	Total lifted	Rank
Mark Swan	Men's −65 kg	213	2nd place, silver medalist(s)
Matthew Harding	Men's −80 kg	200	5
Liam McGarry	Men's +107 kg	228	5
Zoe Newson	Women's –45 kg	109	2nd place, silver medalist(s)
Olivia Broome	Women's −50 kg	119	3rd place, bronze medalist(s)
Lottie McGuinness	Women's −55 kg	105	4
Louise Sugden	Women's −79 kg	132	5

== Rowing ==
British rowers qualified boats in each of the following classes at the 2023 World Rowing Championships in Belgrade, Serbia. The squad for the Games was announced on 8 July 2024.

Athlete	Event	Heats		Repechage		Final	
Athlete	Event	Time	Rank	Time	Rank	Time	Rank
Benjamin Pritchard	PR1 men's single sculls	8:51.36 PGB	1 FA	Bye		9:03.84	1st place, gold medalist(s)
Lauren Rowles; Gregg Stevenson	PR2 mixed double sculls	7:56.92 WB	1 FA	Bye		8:20.97	1st place, gold medalist(s)
Sam Murray; Annie Caddick	PR3 mixed double sculls	7:13.06	2 R	7:20.53	1 FA	7:28.19	2nd place, silver medalist(s)
Frankie Allen; Josh O'Brien; Giedre Rakauskaite; Ed Fuller; Erin Kennedy (cox)	PR3 mixed coxed four	6:43.68 WB	1 FA	Bye		6:55.30	1st place, gold medalist(s)

Qualification Legend: FA=Final A (medal); FB=Final B (non-medal); R=Repechage, PGB= Paralympic Games Best, WB= World Best

== Shooting ==
British shooters achieved quota places for the following events by virtue of their best finishes at the 2022, 2023 and 2024 World Cups, 2022 World Championships, 2023 World Championships, 2023 European Para Championships and 2024 European Championships, as long as they obtained a minimum qualifying score (MQS) by 15 July 2024.

ParalympicsGB announced their squad of four shooters on 27 June 2024.

Mixed

Athlete	Event	Qualification		Final	
Athlete	Event	Score	Rank	Score	Rank
Issy Bailey	P3 – 25 m pistol SH1	557-11x	19	Did not advance	
Ryan Cockbill	R4 – 10 m air rifle standing SH2	628.8	18	Did not advance	
Ryan Cockbill	R5 – 10 m air rifle prone SH2	634.2	15	Did not advance	
Ryan Cockbill	R9 – 50 m rifle prone SH2	624.8	3 Q	185.5	5
Tim Jeffery	R4 – 10 m air rifle standing SH2	630.7	10	Did not advance	
Tim Jeffery	R5 – 10 m air rifle prone SH2	633.8	16	Did not advance	
Tim Jeffery	R9 – 50 m rifle prone SH2	624.7	4 Q	227.8	3rd place, bronze medalist(s)
Matt Skelhon	R3 – 10 m air rifle prone SH1	634.8	6 Q	188.5	5
Matt Skelhon	R6 – 50 m rifle prone SH1	623.1	11	Did not advance	

== Swimming ==
Great Britain secured thirteen quotas at the 2023 World Para Swimming Championships after finishing in the top two places in Paralympic class disciplines.

On 20 May 2024, Aquatics GB announced their swim team of 26 athletes for the Games, but did not confirm individual events. Matthew Redfern joined his sister Rebecca in the squad on 12 July after a successful bipartite application.

Men

Athlete	Event	Heats		Final	
Athlete	Event	Result	Rank	Result	Rank
Stephen Clegg	100 m freestyle S12	53.73	1 Q	53.67	4
Stephen Clegg	100 m backstroke S12	1:00.00	1 Q	59.02 WR	1st place, gold medalist(s)
Stephen Clegg	100 m butterfly S12	57.63	1 Q	57.49	1st place, gold medalist(s)
Rhys Darbey	200 m individual medley SM14	2:12.45	4 Q	2:08.61	2nd place, silver medalist(s)
Bruce Dee	100 m breaststroke SB6	1:23.91	5 Q	1:23.05	5
Bruce Dee	200 m individual medley SM6	2:44.28	4 Q	2:43.40	4
William Ellard	200 m freestyle S14	1:55.19	2 Q	1:51.30 WR	1st place, gold medalist(s)
William Ellard	100 m backstroke S14	1:00.58	6 Q	59:37	4
William Ellard	100 m butterfly S14	54.97	1 Q	54.86	2nd place, silver medalist(s)
William Ellard	200 m individual medley SM14	2:12.48	5 Q	2:11.17	5
Louis Lawlor	100 m backstroke S14	1:00.41	3 Q	1:00.52	7
Matthew Redfern	100 m breaststroke SB13	1:12.90	13	Did not advance	
Harry Stewart	100 m breaststroke SB14	1:05.69	5 Q	1:05.75	5
Mark Tompsett	100 m backstroke S14	59.19	2 Q	59:21	3rd place, bronze medalist(s)
Cameron Vearncombe	100 m butterfly S14	58.34	7 Q	58.73	8
Cameron Vearncombe	200 m individual medley SM14	2:13.03	6 Q	2:14.19	7

Women

Athlete	Event	Heats		Final	
Athlete	Event	Result	Rank	Result	Rank
Ellie Challis	100 m freestyle S3	1:44.46	4 Q	1:42.75	4
Ellie Challis	50 m backstroke S3	53.86	1 Q	53.56	1st place, gold medalist(s)
Louise Fiddes	200 m freestyle S14	2:10.64	2 Q	2:07.91	3rd place, bronze medalist(s)
Louise Fiddes	100 m breaststroke SB14	1:17.46	4 Q	1:15.47	1st place, gold medalist(s)
Louise Fiddes	100 m butterfly S14	1:07.91	7 Q	1:06.91	6
Louise Fiddes	200 m individual medley SM14	2:34.28	6 Q	2:27.96	4
Grace Harvey	100 m breaststroke SB5	1:42.73	1 Q	1:42.33	1st place, gold medalist(s)
Grace Harvey	50 m butterfly S6	40.23	9	Did not advance	
Grace Harvey	200 m individual medley SM6	3:05.50	3 Q	3:04.35	4
Suzanna Hext	100 m freestyle S5	DNS		Did not advance	
Eliza Humphrey	400 m freestyle S11	5:41.72	8 Q	5:40.44	8
Eliza Humphrey	200 m individual medley SM11	3:03.90	7 Q	2:59.51	7
Scarlett Humphrey	50 m freestyle S11	30.98	7 Q	30.85	7
Scarlett Humphrey	400 m freestyle S11	5:28.25	6 Q	5:24.03	6
Scarlett Humphrey	100 m breaststroke SB11	1:31.90	6 Q	1:30.61	6
Scarlett Humphrey	200 m individual SM11	2:51.71	5 Q	2:49.59	6
Tully Kearney	100 m freestyle S5	1:17.75	1 Q	1:25.10	1st place, gold medalist(s)
Tully Kearney	200 m freestyle S5	2:49.40	1 Q	2:46.50	1st place, gold medalist(s)
Tully Kearney	50 m backstroke S5	43.89	6 Q	43.40	5
Poppy Maskill	200 m freestyle S14	2:10.36	1 Q	2:07.16	2nd place, silver medalist(s)
Poppy Maskill	100 m backstroke S14	1:07.51	1 Q	1:05.74	1st place, gold medalist(s)
Poppy Maskill	100 m butterfly S14	1:03.66	1 Q	1:03.00 WR	1st place, gold medalist(s)
Poppy Maskill	200 m individual medley SM14	2:31.42	5 Q	2:23.93	2nd place, silver medalist(s)
Megan Neave	100 m backstroke S14	1:09.74	3 Q	1:09.59	4
Olivia Newman-Baronius	200 m freestyle S14	2:11.64	3 Q	2:08.41	4
Olivia Newman-Baronius	100 m backstroke S14	1:10.17	5 Q	1:08.74	3rd place, bronze medalist(s)
Olivia Newman-Baronius	100 m breaststroke SB14	1:21.81	8 Q	1:22.20	8
Olivia Newman-Baronius	100 m butterfly S14	1:05.30	3 Q	1:04.59	4
Olivia Newman-Baronius	200 m individual medley SM14	2:28.03	1 Q	2:32.50	6
Rebecca Redfern	100 m breaststroke SB13	1:16.40	1 Q	1:16.02	1st place, gold medalist(s)
Faye Rogers	100 m freestyle S10	1:02.39 (1:01.90 swim-off)	=8 (2)	Did not advance	
Faye Rogers	400 m freestyle S10	4:43.22	5 Q	4:41.50	5
Faye Rogers	100 m butterfly S10	1:05.92	1 Q	1:05.84	1st place, gold medalist(s)
Faye Rogers	200 m individual medley SM10	2:34.91	3 Q	2:33.90	5
Toni Shaw	100 m freestyle S9	1:05.29	6 Q	1:05.60	8
Toni Shaw	400 m freestyle S9	4:53.38	6 Q	4:48.44	5
Toni Shaw	200 m individual medley SM9	2:40.58	2 Q	2:37.88	4
Maisie Summers-Newton	400 m freestyle S6	—N/a		5:21.36	3rd place, bronze medalist(s)
Maisie Summers-Newton	100 m breastroke SB6	—N/a		1:31.30 PR	1st place, gold medalist(s)
Maisie Summers-Newton	200 m individual medley SM6	2:58.40	1 Q	2:56.90	1st place, gold medalist(s)
Alice Tai	50 m freestyle S8	30.52	2 Q	29.91	1st place, gold medalist(s)
Alice Tai	400 m freestyle S8	5:08.82	4 Q	4:52.24	2nd place, silver medalist(s)
Alice Tai	100 m backstroke S8	1:14.26	1 Q	1:09.06 PR	1st place, gold medalist(s)
Alice Tai	100 m butterfly S8	1:12.30	2 Q	1:13.60	3rd place, bronze medalist(s)
Alice Tai	200 m individual medley SM8	2:43.70	2 Q	2:41.29	3rd place, bronze medalist(s)
Callie-Ann Warrington	100 m freestyle S10	1:01.13	2 Q	1:01.10	4
Callie-Ann Warrington	100 m butterfly S10	1:07.23	2 Q	1:06.41	2nd place, silver medalist(s)
Brock Whiston	400 m freestyle S8	5:13.08	7 Q	5:00.89	5
Brock Whiston	100 m breaststroke SB8	1:24.59	2 Q	1:21.04	2nd place, silver medalist(s)
Brock Whiston	100 m butterfly S8	1:15.97	5 Q	1:13.69	4
Brock Whiston	200 m individual SM8	2:45.43	3 Q	2:40.37	1st place, gold medalist(s)
Iona Winnifrith	100 m breaststroke SB7	1:32.36	2 Q	1:29.69	2nd place, silver medalist(s)
Iona Winnifrith	50 m butterfly S7	39.34	10	Did not advance	
Iona Winnifrith	200 m individual medley SM7	3:10.16	7 Q	3:03.24 ER	4

Mixed

Athlete	Event	Heats		Final	
Athlete	Event	Result	Rank	Result	Rank
William Ellard; Rhys Darbey; Poppy Maskill; Olivia Newman-Baronius	Mixed 4x100 m freestyle relay S14	—N/a		3:43.05	1st place, gold medalist(s)
Scarlett Humphrey; Matthew Redfern; Rebecca Redfern; Stephen Clegg	Mixed 4x100 m freestyle relay VI 49pts	—N/a		4:04.12	4

== Table tennis ==
Great Britain entered eleven para table tennis players to compete at Paris 2024. Will Bayley secured a quota for himself by virtue of winning a gold medal in the C7 classification at the 2023 European Para Championships held in Sheffield, Great Britain; meanwhile other players qualified for the games through the allocation of ITTF final ranking. In addition Tom Matthews and Megan Shackleton received invitations from the Bipartite Commission. The members of the squad were confirmed on 17 July 2024.

Men

Athlete	Event	First round	Second round	Quarterfinals	Semifinals	Final / BM	
Athlete	Event	Opposition Result	Opposition Result	Opposition Result	Opposition Result	Opposition Result	Rank
Rob Davies	Individual C1	—N/a	Bye	Kim (KOR); W 3–2	Major (HUN); W 3–1	Fernandez (CUB); L 0–3	2nd place, silver medalist(s)
Tom Matthews	Individual C1	—N/a	Bye	Fernandez (CUB); L 1–3	Did not advance		=5
Martin Perry	Individual C6	—N/a	Seidenfeld (USA); L 1–3	Did not advance			=9
Paul Karabardak	Individual C6	—N/a	Rosenmeier (DEN); L 0–3	Did not advance			=9
Will Bayley	Individual C7	—N/a	Messi (FRA); W 3–0	Schnake (GER); W 3–1	Montanus (NED); W 3–0	Yan (CHN); L 2-3	2nd place, silver medalist(s)
Aaron McKibbin	Individual C8	Bye	Csejtey (SVK); W 3–2	Zhao (CHN); L 0–3	Did not advance		=5
Billy Shilton	Individual C8	Bye	Wangphonphat-hanasiri (THA); L 1–3	Did not advance			=9
Joshua Stacey	Individual C9	—N/a	Kats (UKR); W 3–1	Ma (AUS); L 0–3	Did not advance		=5
Rob Davies; Tom Matthews	Doubles MD4	—N/a	Bye	Jang / Park (KOR); L 0–3	Did not advance		=5
Will Bayley; Martin Perry	Doubles MD14	—N/a	Rau / Schnake (GER); W 3–0	Berthier / Herrault (FRA); L 2–3	Did not advance		=5
Paul Karabardak; Billy Shilton	Doubles MD14	—N/a	Dourbecker / Messi (FRA); W 3–0	Salmin / Stroh (BRA); W 3–1	Thainiyom/ Wangphonphat-hanasiri (THA); L 0–3	Did not advance	3rd place, bronze medalist(s)
Aaron McKibbin; Joshua Stacey	Doubles MD18	—N/a	Misztal / Chudzicki (POL); L 2–3	Did not advance			=9

Women

Athlete	Event	First round	Quarterfinals	Semifinals	Final / BM	
Athlete	Event	Opposition Result	Opposition Result	Opposition Result	Opposition Result	Rank
Megan Shackleton	Individual C4	Alanazi (KSA); W 3–0	Peric-Rankovic (SRB); L 2–3	Did not advance		=5
Felicity Pickard	Individual C6	Bye	Ciripan (ROU); L 2–3	Did not advance		=5
Bly Twomey	Individual C7	Bye	Sand (SWE); W 3–0	Korkut (TUR); L 2–3	Did not advance	3rd place, bronze medalist(s)
Felicity Pickard; Bly Twomey	Doubles WD14	—N/a	Korneliussen / Slettum (NOR); W 3–0	Huang / Jin (CHN); L 1–3	Did not advance	3rd place, bronze medalist(s)

Mixed

Athlete	Event	First round	Second round	Quarterfinals	Semifinals	Final / BM	
Athlete	Event	Opposition Result	Opposition Result	Opposition Result	Opposition Result	Opposition Result	Rank
Tom Matthews; Megan Shackleton	Doubles XD7	Chen / di Toro (AUS); W 3–1	Bruechle / Mikolaschek (AUS); L 0–3	Did not advance			=9
Joshua Stacey; Bly Twomey	Doubles XD17	Alabi / Obazuaye (NGR); W 3–1	Chojnowski / Marszał (POL); W 3–0	Zhou / Mao (CHN); L 0–3	Did not advance		=5

== Taekwondo ==
Great Britain entered three athletes to compete at the Paralympics competition. All of them qualified for Paris 2024, by virtue of finishing within the top six in the Paralympic rankings in their respective class. The squad was revealed on the 18 June and included Tokyo2020 medallists Beth Munro and Amy Truesdale.

Athlete	Event	First round	Quarterfinals	Semifinals	Repechage	Final / BM	
Athlete	Event	Opposition Result	Opposition Result	Opposition Result	Opposition Result	Opposition Result	Rank
Matt Bush	Men's +80 kg	Bye	Keita (SEN); W 16–4	Haghshenas (IRI); W 26–13	—N/a	Ramazanov (NPA); W 5–0	1st place, gold medalist(s)
Beth Munro	Women's –65 kg	Bye	Yao (CHN); L 16–20	Did not advance	Gjessing (DEN); L 2–10	Did not advance	
Amy Truesdale	Women's +65 kg	Bye	Akermach (DEN); W 30–9	Vargas Fernandez (MEX); W 26–13	—N/a	Naimova (UZB); W 8–2; WDR	1st place, gold medalist(s)

== Wheelchair basketball ==
Summary

Team	Event	Group Stage				Quarterfinal	Semifinal	Final / BM	
Team	Event	Opposition Score	Opposition Score	Opposition Score	Rank	Opposition Score	Opposition Score	Opposition Score	Rank
Great Britain men's	Men's tournament	Germany; W 76–55	Canada; W 88–58	France; W 85–50	1 Q	Australia; W 84–64	Germany; W 71–43	United States; L 69–73	2nd place, silver medalist(s)
Great Britain women's	Women's tournament	Spain; W 69–34	Canada; L 54–63	China; L 47–62	3 Q	United States; L 52–59	Classification 5-8; Japan; W 67–55	Playoff 5-6; Germany; W 48–39	5

=== Men's tournament ===
Great Britain men's qualified to compete by being finalist at the 2023 European Wheelchair Basketball Championships in Rotterdam. On 10 July 2024, Great Britain announced the squad for the men's team. Terry Bywater will be competing at his seventh Games.

Men's squad

Player	Club	Class
Abdi Jama	Amivel Reyes Gutierrez	1
Jim Palmer	Rhine River Rhinos	1
Simon Brown	Amiab Albacete	2
Kyle Marsh	Amivel Reyes Gutierrez	2
Gregg Warburton	CD Ilunion	2
Harry Brown	Amiab Albacete	2.5
Phil Pratt	Amiab Albacete	3
Ben Fox	Amiab Albacete	3.5
Peter Cusack	UCAM Murcia	3.5
Lee Fryer	UCAM Murcia	4
Lee Manning	Amiab Albacete	4.5
Terry Bywater	CD Ilunion	4.5

=== Women's tournament ===
Great Britain women's qualified to compete by being finalist at the 2023 European Wheelchair Basketball Championships in Rotterdam. On 10 July 2024, Great Britain announced the squad for the women's team.

Women's squad

The following is the Great Britain roster in the women's wheelchair basketball tournament of the 2024 Summer Paralympics.

Great Britain women's national wheelchair basketball team - 2024 Summer Paralympics roster
Players
Coaches

No.	Name	Age – Date of birth	Pts.
4	Charlotte Moore	25 – 13 September 1998	1.0
5	Sophie Carrigill	30 – 19 January 1994	1.0
7	Helen Freeman	34 – 23 November 1989	4.0
8	Laurie Williams	32 – 4 February 1992	2.5
10	Amy Conroy	31 – 22 October 1992	4.0
12	Lucy Robinson	25 – 21 May 1999	4.5
14	Joy Haizelden	25 – 1 December 1998	2.5
15	Robyn Love	34 – 28 August 1990	3.5
16	Jade Atkin	22 – 18 September 2001	4.5
17	Maddie Martin	20 – 25 July 2004	3.0
18	Katie Morrow	24 – 20 September 1999	4.5
19	Jodie Waite	20 – 23 March 2004	1.0

Head coach

Miguel Vaquero Maestre

Assistant coach(es)

Jorge Borba Cintas

Legend

- Age - describes age on 29 August 2024

== Wheelchair fencing ==
At the end of the qualification period, Great Britain had qualified the following fencers for Paris. Four fencers were announced in Great Britain's squad for the Games on 3 July 2024.

Individual

Athlete	Event	Round of 32	Round of 16	Quarterfinal	Repechage 1	Repechage 2	Repechage 3	Semifinal	Final / BM	
Athlete	Event	Opposition Score	Opposition Score	Opposition Score	Opposition Score	Opposition Score	Opposition Score	Opposition Score	Opposition Score	Rank
Dimitri Coutya	Men's individual épée B	Bye	Hanssen (USA); W 15–7	Massa (ITA); W 15–10	—N/a			Dabrowski (POL); W 15–13	Kingmanaw (THA); W 15–10	1st place, gold medalist(s)
Dimitri Coutya	Men's individual foil B	—N/a	Bye	Kingmanaw (THA); W 15–5	—N/a			Serozhenko (UKR); W 15–4	Feng (CHN); W 15–4	1st place, gold medalist(s)
Dimitri Coutya	Men's individual sabre B	—N/a	Datsko (UKR); W 15–2	Castro (POL); L 13–15	—N/a	Hanssen (USA); W 15–5	Serozhenko (UKR); L 13–15	Did not advance		8
Piers Gilliver	Men's individual épée A	Bye	Schoonover (USA); W 15–1	Tian (CHN); W 15–12	—N/a			Akkaya (TUR); W 15–6	Sun (CHN); L 12–15	2nd place, silver medalist(s)
Piers Gilliver	Men's individual sabre A	—N/a	Bye	Dei Rossi (ITA); W 15–8	—N/a			Manko (UKR); W 15–14	Schmidt (GER); L 8–15	2nd place, silver medalist(s)
Oliver Lam-Watson	Men's individual épée A	Bye	Al-Madhkhoori (IRQ); W 15–14	Lambertini (ITA); L 9–15	—N/a	Al-Ogaili (IRQ); W 15–12	Manko (UKR); L 11–15	Did not advance		8
Oliver Lam-Watson	Men's individual foil A	Bye	Sun (CHN); L 2–15	Did not advance	Branch (USA); W 15–7	Nalewajek (POL); W 15–10	Osváth (HUN); L 14–15	Did not advance		8
Gemma Collis-McCann	Women's individual épée A	Bye	Krajnyák (HUN); W 15–12	Veres (HUN); L 7–15	—N/a	Breus (UKR); L 7–15	Did not advance			9
Gemma Collis-McCann	Women's individual sabre A	Bye	Morkvych (UKR); L 7–15	Did not advance	Oliveira (BRA); W 15–0	Yu (HKG); W 15–9	Vide (FRA); L 10–15	Did not advance		7

Teams

Athlete	Event	Round of 16	Quarterfinal	Semifinal	Final / BM	
Athlete	Event	Opposition Score	Opposition Score	Opposition Score	Opposition Score	Rank
Dimitri Coutya; Piers Gulliver; Oliver Lam-Watson	Men's Team épée	Bye	France (FRA); W 45–20	Iraq (IRQ); L 39–45	Poland (POL); W 45–28	3rd place, bronze medalist(s)
Dimitri Coutya; Piers Gulliver; Oliver Lam-Watson	Men's Team foil	Bye	Brazil (BRA); W 45–17	France (FRA); W 45–25	China (CHN); L 34–45	2nd place, silver medalist(s)

== Wheelchair rugby ==
Great Britain qualified to compete by being finalists at the 2023 European Wheelchair Rugby Championships in Cardiff.

On 24 June 2024, Paralympics GB announced their squad for the tournament.

Summary

Team	Group Stage				Semifinal	Final / BM	
Team	Opposition Score	Opposition Score	Opposition Score	Rank	Opposition Score	Opposition Score	Rank
Great Britain national team	Australia; W 58—55	Denmark; W 55–53	France; W 50–49	1 Q	United States; L 43–50	Australia; L 48–50	4

Squad

Player	Club	Player	Club
Tyler Walker	Cheltenham Tigers	Jamie Stead	Leicester Tigers
Stuart Robinson (v-c)	West Coast	Jack Smith	North East Bulls
Ollie Mangion	London	Gavin Walker (c)	Leicester Tigers
Nicholas Cummins	Leicester Tigers	David Ross	London
Kieran Flynn	Leicester Tigers	Dan Kellett	West Coast
Jonathan Coggan	London	Aaron Phipps	London

(c) = Captain (v-c) = Vice-captain

Group stage

Group A

Pos	Team	Pld	W	D	L	GF	GA	GD	Pts	Qualification
1	Great Britain	3	3	0	0	163	157	+6	6	Semi-finals
2	Australia	3	2	0	1	163	160	+3	4	Semi-finals
3	France (H)	3	1	0	2	155	156	−1	2	Placings rounds
4	Denmark	3	0	0	3	153	161	−8	0	Placings rounds

Source: Paris 2024
(H) Hosts
29 August 2020
11:30

Australia	55–58	Great Britain
Ryley Batt – 36; Chris Bond – 12; Beau Vernon – 3 Ella Sabljak – 1 Andrew Edmondson – 1	Report	Aaron Phipps – 25; Stuart Robinson – 23; Gavin Walker – 3 Jonathan Coggan – 2 Jack Smith – 1 Kieran Flynn – 1

Grand Palais Éphémère, Paris

30 August 2024
11:30

Great Britain	55–53	Denmark
Stuart Robinson – 26; Aaron Phipps – 12; Jamie Stead – 6 Gavin Walker – 4 Nick Cummins – 3 Jonathan Coggan – 2 Kieran Flynn – 2	Report	Mark Peters – 21; Sebastien Frederiksen – 12; Leon Jorgensen – 6 Jakob Mortensen – 5 Kaare Momme Nielsen – 5 Jesper Krueger – 1

Grand Palais Éphémère, Paris

31 August 2024
19:30

France	49–50	Great Britain
Jonathan Hivernat – 27; Sebastien Verdin – 8 Rodolphe Jarlan – 5 Jordan Ducret – 1	Report	Aaron Phipps – 21; Stuart Robinson – 15; Jack Smith – 3 Jamie Stead – 3

Grand Palais Éphémère, Paris

== Wheelchair tennis ==
Great Britain qualified six players via the world rankings as at 15 July 2024. The team was confirmed on 19 July. Abbie Breakwell and Greg Slade were added to the team after receiving invitations from the Bipartite Commission.

Athlete	Event	Round of 64	Round of 32	Round of 16	Quarterfinals	Semifinals	Final / BM	
Athlete	Event	Opposition Result	Opposition Result	Opposition Result	Opposition Result	Opposition Result	Opposition Result	Rank
Ben Bartram	Men's singles	Laget (FRA); W 6–4, 6–4	Oda (JPN); L 2–6, 6–7^{4–7}	Did not advance				
Alfie Hewett	Men's singles	Bye	Lysov (ISR); W 6–0, 6–1	Arai (JPN); W 7–5, 6–2	Spaargaren (NED); W 6–1, 6–4	de la Puente (ESP); W 6–2, 6–0	Oda (JPN); L 2–6, 6–4, 5–7	2nd place, silver medalist(s)
Gordon Reid	Men's singles	Bye	Dharmasena (SRI); W 6–0, 6–0	Miki (JPN); W 6–1, 6–1	Fernandez (ARG); L 0–6, 6–7^{5–7}	Did not advance		
Dahnon Ward	Men's singles	Himam (MAR); W 6–3, 7–6^{9–7}	Houdet (FRA); L 2–6, 1–6	Did not advance				
Ben Bartram; Dahnon Ward	Men's doubles	—N/a	Boukartacha / Himam (MAR); W 6–3, 3–6, [10–5]	Egberink / Scheffers (NED); L 2–6, 5–7	Did not advance			
Alfie Hewett; Gordon Reid	Men's doubles	—N/a	Bye	Cataldo / Tapia (CHI); W 6–1, 6–3	Spaargaren / ter Hofte (NED); W 6–2, 6–1	Cattaneo / Houdet (FRA); W 6–4, 6–3	Miki / Oda (JPN); W 6–2, 6–1	1st place, gold medalist(s)
Abbie Breakwell	Women's singles	—N/a	Phelps (USA); L 3–6, 4–6	Did not advance				
Lucy Shuker	Women's singles	—N/a	Fairbank (FRA); W 6–4, 7–5	Li (CHN); L 0–6, 2–6	Did not advance			
Abbie Breakwell; Lucy Shuker	Women's doubles	—N/a		Bos / de Greef (NED); L 2–6, 4—6	Did not advance			
Andy Lapthorne	Quads singles	—N/a		Pérez (CHI); W 6–4, 6–3	Kaplan (TUR); L 4–6, 6–3, 3–6	Did not advance		
Greg Slade	Quads singles	—N/a		Altınel (TUR); W 6–7^{6–8}, 7–6^{7–1}, 6–1	Sasson (ISR); L 1—6, 2–6	Did not advance		
Andy Lapthorne; Greg Slade	Quads doubles	—N/a			Bye	Pena / Silva (BRA); W 6–1, 7–5	Schröder / Vink (NED); L 1–6, 1–6	2nd place, silver medalist(s)

== See also ==
- Great Britain at the Paralympics
- Great Britain at the 2024 Summer Olympics
