= Cycling at the 2024 Summer Paralympics – Men's road race C1–3 =

Men's road race C1-3 at the XVII Paralympic Games
- Venue: Clichy-sous-Bois
- Dates: 7 September 2024

Medalists
1st place, gold medalist(s)		Finlay Graham	Great Britain
2nd place, silver medalist(s)		Thomas Peyroton-Dartet	France
3rd place, bronze medalist(s)		Alexandre Leaute	France

The men's road race C1-3 cycling event at the 2024 Summer Paralympics took place on 7 September 2024 in Clichy-sous-Bois in Seine-Saint-Denis, Paris, France. 39 riders competed in the event.

The event covers the following three classifications, that all use standard bicycles:

- C1: severe hemiplegic or diplegic spasticity; severe athetosis or ataxia; bilateral through knee amputation, etc.
- C2: moderate hemiplegic or diplegic spasticity; moderate athetosis or ataxia; unilateral above knee amputation, etc.
- C3: moderate hemiplegic or diplegic spasticity; moderate athetosis or ataxia; bilateral below knee or unilateral through knee amputation, etc.

== Schedule ==
F	Finals

Men's Road Race
Event↓/Date →	5 September	6 September	7 September
B		F	
H1-2	F		
H3	F		
H4	F		
H5	F		
C1-3			F
C4-5		F	
T1-2			F

== Results ==
The event took place on 6 September 2024 at 9:30.

Rank	Rider	Nationality	Class	Time	Gap	Notes
1st place, gold medalist(s)	Finlay Graham	Great Britain	C3	1:43:19		
2nd place, silver medalist(s)	Thomas Peyroton-Dartet	France	C3	1:43:19	+00:00	s.t.
3rd place, bronze medalist(s)	Alexandre Léauté	France	C2	1:43:43	+00:24	
4	Alexandre Hayward	Canada	C3	1:45:09	+01:50	
5	Benjamin Watson	Great Britain	C3	1:47:14	+03:55	s.t.
6	Jaco van Gass	Great Britain	C3	1:47:14	+03:55	s.t.
7	Matthew Robertson	Great Britain	C2	1:50:31	+07:12	
8	Ewoud Vromant	Belgium	C2	1:50:33	+07:14	
9	Ricardo Ten Argilés	Spain	C1	1:50:37	+07:18	
10	Eduardo Santas Asensio	Spain	C3	1:50:42	+07:23	s.t.
11	Matthias Schindler	Germany	C3	1:50:42	+07:23	s.t.
12	Henrik Marvig	Sweden	C3	1:50:59	+07:40	
13	Darren Hicks	Australia	C2	1:51:30	+08:11	
14	Nikolaos Papangelis	Greece	C2	1:56:08	+12:49	
15	Masaki Fujita	Japan	C3	1:56:13	+12:54	
16	Muhammad Adi Raimie Amizazahan	Malaysia	C3	1:56:23	+13:04	
17	Telmo Pinao	Portugal	C2	1:56:28	+13:09	
18	Zbigniew Maciejewski	Poland	C1	1:56:32	+13:13	
19	Michael Teuber	Germany	C1	1:58:07	+14:48	s.t.
20	Shota Kawamoto	Japan	C2	1:58:07	+14:48	s.t.
21	Golibbek Mirzoyarov	Uzbekistan	C2	1:59:17	+15:58	
22	Gordon Allan	Australia	C2	2:03:01	+19:42	
23	Carlos Alberto Gomes Soares	Brazil	C1	2:07:48	+24:29	
24	Haytam el Amraouy	Morocco	C1	2:08:15	+24:56	
25	Esteban Goddard Medica	Panama	C2	2:08:22	+25:03	
26	Mohamad Yusof Hafizi Shaharuddin	Malaysia	C1	2:08:46	+25:27	s.t.
27	Liang Weicong	China	C1	2:08:4	+25:27	s.t.
	Arshad Shaik	India	C2	-1 Lap		
	Rodrigo Fernando Lopez	Argentina	C1	-1 Lap		
	Israel Hilario Rimas	Peru	C2	DNF		
	Pierre Senska	Germany	C1	DNF		
	Devon Briggs	New Zealand	C3	DNS		

s.t. Same time
