= Cycling at the 2024 Summer Paralympics – Men's road time trial C3 =

Men's road time trial C3 at the XVII Paralympic Games
- Venue: Clichy-sous-Bois
- Dates: 4 September
- Competitors: 11 from 9 nations
- Winning time: 38:28.80

Medalists
1st place, gold medalist(s)		Thomas Peyroton-Dartet	France
2nd place, silver medalist(s)		Eduardo Santas	Spain
3rd place, bronze medalist(s)		Matthias Schindler	Germany

The Men's time trial C3 road cycling event at the 2024 Summer Paralympics took place on 4 September 2024, at Clichy-sous-Bois, Paris. 11 riders competed in the event.

The C3 classification is for cyclists described as follows:

C3: moderate hemiplegic or diplegic spasticity; moderate athetosis or ataxia; bilateral below knee or unilateral through knee amputation, etc.

== Results ==
Rank	Rider	Nationality	Class	Time	Deficit
1st place, gold medalist(s)	Thomas Peyroton-Dartet	France	C3	38:28.80	
2nd place, silver medalist(s)	Eduardo Santas	Spain	C3	39:12.71	+0:43.91
3rd place, bronze medalist(s)	Matthias Schindler	Germany	C3	39:21.35	+0:52.55
4	Benjamin Watson	Great Britain	C3	39:22.90	+0:54.10
5	Alexandre Hayward	Canada	C3	39:30.48	+1:01.68
6	Finlay Graham	Great Britain	C3	39:39.46	+1:10.66
7	Masaki Fujita	Japan	C3	40:14.50	+1:45.70
8	Jaco van Gass	Great Britain	C3	44:19.48	+5:50.68
9	Henrik Marvig	Sweden	C3	45:37.27	+7:08.47
10	Muhammad Adi Raimie Amizazahan	Malaysia	C3	46:30.54	+8:01.74
	Devon Briggs	New Zealand	C3	DNS	
