= Fin Graham =

British Paralympic cyclist (born 1999)

Fin Graham MBE
Personal information
- Full name: Finlay Graham
- Nickname: Fin
- Born: 24 September 1999 (age 27)

Cycling career
- Sport: Cycling
- Disciplines: Track, Road
Medal record
Men's para cycling
Representing Great Britain
Summer Paralympics
Gold medal – first place	2024 Paris	Road race C1–3
Silver medal – second place	2020 Tokyo	Individual pursuit C3
Silver medal – second place	2020 Tokyo	Road race C1–3
Silver medal – second place	2024 Paris	Individual pursuit C3
Road World Championships
Gold medal – first place	2022 Baie-Comeau	Road race C3
Gold medal – first place	2023 Glasgow	Road race C3
Gold medal – first place	2024 Zurich	Road race C3
Gold medal – first place	2025 Ronse	Road race C3
Silver medal – second place	2022 Baie-Comeau	Time trial C3
Silver medal – second place	2023 Glasgow	Time trial C3
Silver medal – second place	2024 Zurich	Time trial C3
Bronze medal – third place	2021 Cascais	Road race C3
Bronze medal – third place	2025 Ronse	Time trial C3
Track World Championships
Gold medal – first place	2022 Saint-Quentin-en-Yvelines	Scratch race C3
Gold medal – first place	2022 Saint-Quentin-en-Yvelines	Individual pursuit C3
Gold medal – first place	2022 Saint-Quentin-en-Yvelines	Omnium C3
Gold medal – first place	2023 Glasgow	Individual pursuit C3
Gold medal – first place	2026 Apeldoorn	Scratch race C3
Silver medal – second place	2022 Saint-Quentin-en-Yvelines	Time trial C3
Silver medal – second place	2023 Glasgow	Time trial C3
Silver medal – second place	2023 Glasgow	Scratch race C3
Silver medal – second place	2023 Glasgow	Omnium C3
Silver medal – second place	2025 Rio de Janeiro	Elimination C3
Silver medal – second place	2025 Rio de Janeiro	Scratch race C3
Silver medal – second place	2025 Rio de Janeiro	Mixed team sprint C1–5
Silver medal – second place	2026 Apeldoorn	Elimination C3
Silver medal – second place	2026 Apeldoorn	Mixed team sprint C1–5
Bronze medal – third place	2024 Rio de Janeiro	Time trial C3
Bronze medal – third place	2024 Rio de Janeiro	Omnium C3
Bronze medal – third place	2025 Rio de Janeiro	Sprint C3
Bronze medal – third place	2025 Rio de Janeiro	Time trial C3
Bronze medal – third place	2026 Apeldoorn	Sprint C3
Bronze medal – third place	2026 Apeldoorn	Time trial C3
European Road Championships
Gold medal – first place	2022 Upper Austria	Road race C3
Silver medal – second place	2022 Upper Austria	Time trial C3
Representing Scotland
Commonwealth Games
Bronze medal – third place	2026 Glasgow	Time trial C1-3

Finlay Graham (born 24 September 1999) is a British racing cyclist from Scotland who competes in para-cycling road and track events. He is classified as a C3 cyclist. He has represented Great Britain at two Paralympic Games: in Tokyo, he won silver medals in the track individual pursuit and in the road race. In Paris, he again took a silver medal in the individual pursuit, but took his first Paralympic gold in the road race. Graham is a multiple-time British and World Champion across road and track disciplines.

== Early and personal life ==
Graham grew up in the Scottish Borders and later Strathpeffer in the Scottish Highlands. He attended nearby Dingwall Academy. He has a younger brother, Rory. Graham was born with bilateral club feet and has limited calf muscle and little-to-no movement in his ankles. In 2017, aged 18, Graham was diagnosed with the autoimmune disease lupus.

He started mountain biking at a young age at Glentress. He later competed in the Strathpuffer – a 24-hour mountain bike race in Strathpeffer – several times, including racing it solo at the age of 16. In 2016, having watched the paracycling at the Rio Paralympic Games on television, Graham attended a British Cycling talent identification day in Derby. He caught the attention of the coaches and was selected for the Great Britain Cycling Team development programme at the age of 17. He has lived and trained in Manchester, the home of British Cycling, since 2018.

== Career ==
=== 2017 ===
In 2017, Graham competed at his first National Para-cycling Road Championships, claiming the C3 road race title and finishing second in the C3 time trial. He additionally medalled in track cycling at the Manchester Paracycling International Meeting in November, taking a silver medal in the mixed team sprint alongside Blaine Hunt and Ben Watson.

=== 2018 ===
In 2018, Graham won his first national track cycling title in the C3 time trial; he also took a silver medal in the C3 individual pursuit. At the National Road Championships in June he defended his road race title and again finished second in the time trial. His performances until this point meant that he was selected for his first Road World Championships, in Maniago, Italy, where he finished eighth in the C3 road race and eleventh in the C3 time trial. In an Instagram post shared on 19 October 2018, Graham shared that he had become a full-time professional cyclist with the British Cycling programme.

=== 2019 ===
Graham added two national track titles to his collection in 2019, winning golds in the C3 time trial and the C3 individual pursuit. At his debut Track World Championships in March, he finished fourth in the individual pursuit, fifth in the time trial and sixth in the scratch race. At the National Road Championships in July he again defended his road race title and took silver in the time trial.

=== 2020 ===
Though the cycling season was severely disrupted in 2020 by the COVID-19 pandemic, the Track World Championships in Milton, Canada, in January were able to go ahead before restrictions were put in place. Graham left with similar results to 2019: fifth in the individual pursuit, sixth in the time trial, and seventh in the scratch race.

=== 2021 ===
Graham competed at the 2021 Road World Championships in Cascais, Portugal, coming away with a bronze in the road race. In the time trial he finished fifth. On 15 July 2021 Graham was announced as a member of the ParalympicsGB cycling squad that would be competing at the postponed Tokyo Games. Here he medalled both in the velodrome and on the road, taking home silver medals in the individual pursuit and the C1-3 road race. He was beaten to gold medals by his GB teammates in both events: by Benjamin Watson on the road, and Jaco van Gass on the track. He additionally finished in a close fourth place in the C3 road time trial.

=== 2022 ===
He carried this success from his debut Paralympics through into the 2022 season. At the National Track Championships in March, he won the C3 time trial, the C3 individual pursuit and the C3 scratch race. He competed at two UCI Para Road World Cup events – in Ostend and Elzach – in May, winning both the C3 road race and C3 time trial at both events. At the UEC European Road Championships later that month, Graham won silver in the time trial and gold in the road race, making him a European Champion for the first time. He replicated these results later in the year at the Road World Championships in Baie-Comeau, Canada. At the National Road Championships, he did the double for the first time, winning the time trial and the road race. In October he competed at the Track World Championships in St-Quentin-en-Yvelines and took home four medals: three golds in the individual pursuit, omnium and scratch race, and a silver in the time trial.

=== 2023 ===
Success continued for Graham on the road and track throughout his 2023 season. At the National Track Championships in January, he defended all three of his titles (in the time trial, individual pursuit and scratch race). He competed at every UCI Para Cycling Road World Cup meet, in Maniago, Ostend and Huntsville. He medalled in all six of his events (one time trial and one road race per meet), winning all but the Maniago road race, in which he took silver, beaten only by GB teammate Jaco van Gass. Van Gass would prove to be a consistent rival throughout the season. At the Track World Championships in Glasgow in August, Graham won gold in the individual pursuit. He took silvers in the time trial, scratch race and omnium, each of which was won by Van Gass. At the Road World Championships in Dumfries & Galloway a week later, Graham won the road race but was second in the time trial, which was narrowly won by Matthias Schindler with a margin of less than two seconds.

=== 2024 ===
Graham competed at the 2024 National Track Championships in February, defending his individual pursuit title and taking silver in the time trial. The following month, at the Track World Championships in Rio de Janeiro, he won three medals: a silver in the individual pursuit (beaten only by teammate and close rival Jaco van Gass) and two bronzes in the time trial and the omnium. On 22 July 2024 it was announced that Graham would be competing at the Paris Paralympic Games, his second Paralympics. He competed in one event in the velodrome, the C3 individual pursuit, and came away with a silver medal – GB teammate Van Gass won gold. On the road, Graham rode in both the C1-3 road race and the C3 time trial. In the time trial he finished sixth. Three days later, in the road race, he claimed his first Paralympic gold, beating Frenchman Thomas Peyroton-Dartet in a sprint to the finish line. At the Road World Championships in Zurich later that month, Graham successfully defended his C3 world road race title and again won silver in the C3 time trial, bested only by Florian Bouziani.

Graham was appointed Member of the Order of the British Empire (MBE) in the 2025 New Year Honours for services to cycling.

== Major results ==
2017
National Para-cycling Road Championships

1st C3 Road Race
2nd C3 Time Trial

2018
National Para-cycling Track Championships

1st C3 Time Trial
2nd C3 Individual Pursuit

National Para-cycling Road Championships

1st C3 Road Race
2nd C3 Time Trial

2019
National Para-cycling Track Championships

1st C3 Time Trial
1st C3 Individual Pursuit

National Para-cycling Road Championships

1st C3 Road Race
2nd C3 Time Trial

2021
Paralympic Games

2nd C3 Individual Pursuit
2nd C1-3 Road Race

UCI Para-Cycling Road World Championships

3rd C3 Road Race

2022
UCI Para-Cycling Track World Championships

1st C3 Individual Pursuit
1st C3 Omnium
1st C3 Scratch Race
2nd C3 Time Trial

UCI Para-Cycling Road World Championships

1st C3 Road Race
2nd C3 Time Trial

UEC European Para-Cycling Road Championships

1st C3 Road Race
2nd C3 Time Trial

National Para-cycling Track Championships

1st C3 Time Trial
1st C3 Individual Pursuit
1st C3 Scratch Race

National Para-cycling Road Championships

1st C3 Road Race
1st C3 Time Trial

2023
UCI Para-Cycling Track World Championships

1st C3 Individual Pursuit
2nd C3 Scratch Race
2nd C3 Time Trial
2nd C3 Omnium

UCI Para-Cycling Road World Championships

1st C3 Road Race
2nd C3 Time Trial

National Para-cycling Track Championships

1st C3 Time Trial
1st C3 Individual Pursuit
1st C3 Scratch Race

National Para-cycling Road Championships

1st C3 Road Race

2024
Paralympic Games

1st C1-3 Road Race
2nd C3 Individual Pursuit

UCI Para-Cycling Road World Championships

1st C3 Road Race
2nd C3 Time Trial

UCI Para-Cycling Track World Championships

2nd C3 Individual Pursuit
3rd C3 Time Trial
3rd C3 Omnium

National Para-cycling Track Championships

1st C3 Individual Pursuit
2nd C3 Time Trial

2025
National Para-cycling Track Championships

1st C3 Individual Pursuit
