= Gemma Collis =

British Paralympic wheelchair fencer

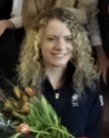
- Collis in 2014
- Born: 10 October 1992 (age 34)
- Education: Durham University
- Occupation: Athlete/Journalist
- Known for: Paralympic fencer

Gemma Collis (born 10 October 1992) is a British Paralympic wheelchair fencer who competed in the Paralympics in 2012, 2016 and 2020. Gemma is an 18 time World Cup medallist, and European silver medallist. She has qualified for Paris 2024. She is Chair of the International Wheelchair and Amputee Sports Federation's Wheelchair Fencing Athletes' Council and a member of the IWAS Wheelchair Fencing Gender Equity Commission.

== Life ==
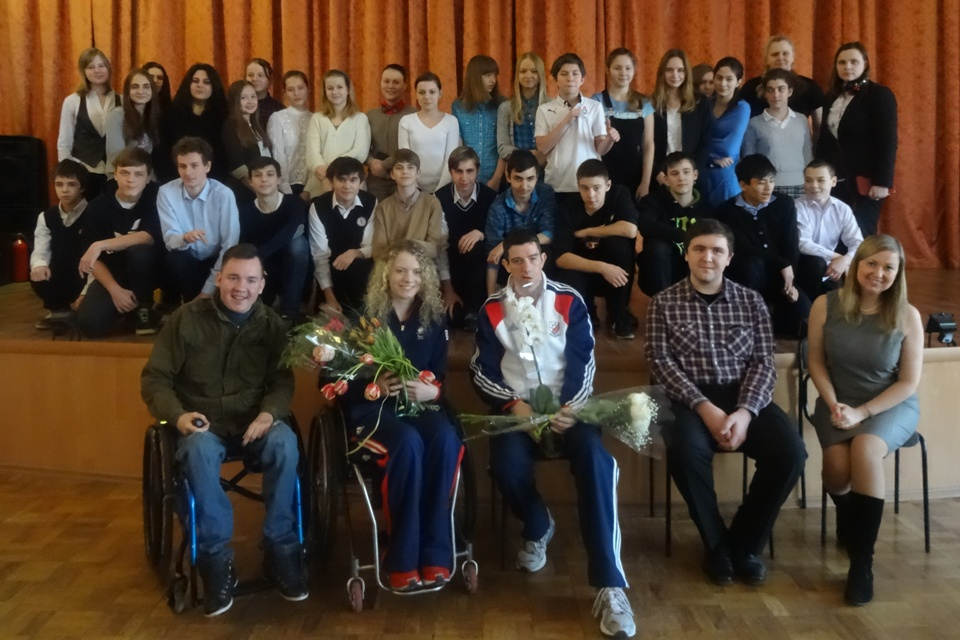
Gemma Collis and Craig McCann visit Moscow school for disabled children in 2014

Gemma Collis grew up in Buckinghamshire as a competitive athlete in multiple sports: figure skating, hockey, 100 metres running, and triple jump, in the last of which she hoped to compete in the London 2012 Summer Olympics. But in July 2008, aged 15, she developed complex regional pain syndrome, causing altered sensation and extreme pain in her right leg, making her dependent on crutches or a wheelchair from then on. She changed from participating in sports events to coaching, officiating, and volunteering at them. In 2010, she discovered she qualified to play wheelchair basketball, and played for Wales u25s at the Lord's Taverners Wheelchair Basketball Celtic Cup 2011.

She was educated at the Durham University from 2011, where she was asked if she would be interested in fencing by professor and GB wheelchair fencing coach Laszlo Jakab in 2011. Jakab would become her friend and was a witness at her wedding. She competed in the Paralympics in London in 2012 after less than a year in the sport. In the team event she came sixth with teammates Gabi Down and Justine Moore. She fenced again at the Paralympics in the 2016 Rio, where she was ranked eighth in the Women's Category A Épée. In 2017 she had her right leg amputated as a result of the pain from complex regional pain syndrome.

Gemma Collis married fellow British Paralympian Craig McCann in July 2017; both took the hyphenated last name Collis-McCann. They had met whilst competing together at the London 2012 Paralympics in wheelchair fencing. Craig later switched sports to para-cycling in 2017. However, the pair divorced in 2020.

In 2018 Gemma Collis won her first World Cup gold in Montreal. She beat the World No 1 at the time, Zsuzsanna Krajnyak of Hungary 15-13 in the final.

In July 2021 she and three sportsmen, Piers Gilliver, Dimitri Coutya and Oliver Lam-Watson were identified as the British wheelchair fencing team who would compete at the delayed 2020 Summer Paralympics in Tokyo. Her selection followed 18 months when she did not compete due to the COVID-19 pandemic, including the closing of the Tokyo qualification window by the International Wheelchair and Amputee Sports Federation. She has qualified for three Paralympics, but in Tokyo she qualified for both the Category A Women's épée and the sabre – the latter of which was making its Games debut. She competed in both finishing 10th in Epee and 13th in Sabre. Despite out-performing her ranking in both weapons, she said she was disappointed with the result but had learned a lot. She was planning for 2024 in Paris.

Gemma has won 15 World Cup medals – including three golds. Her most recent gold came at the IWAS Wheelchair Fencing World Cup in Pisa in March 2023 when she beat China's Yuandong Chen in the final 15-7 to win gold, having overcome reigning Paralympic and European champion Amarilla Veres of Hungary in the semi-final. The victory took her to World No 1 for the first time in her career.

She is vice-chair of the International Wheelchair and Amputee Sports Federation's Wheelchair Fencing Athletes' Council. In 2021 she joined other international representatives on a new Gender Equity Commission set up to look at Wheelchair Fencing.

In 2022 she was presented a poster on 'The Power of Disability Sport to Change the Lives of Women with Disabilities' which used Wheelchair Fencing as a case study, alongside fellow IWAS Fencing Gender Equity Commission members Ksenia Ovsyannikova, Dominique Hornus-Dragne and Christina Massiala-Vaka at the International Working Group on Women and Sport World Conference held in Auckland.
