= Abbie Breakwell =

British wheelchair tennis player

- Country (sports): Great Britain
- Born: 29 March 2003 (age 22); Nottingham, England
- Turned pro: 2019
- Plays: Right-handed (one-handed backhand)

Singles
- Career titles: 11
- Highest ranking: No. 32 (15 August 2022)
- Current ranking: No. 33 (18 August 2025)

Other tournaments
- Paralympic Games: 1R (2024)

Doubles
- Career titles: 21
- Highest ranking: No. 26 (22 August 2022)
- Current ranking: No. 33 (18 August 2025)
- Paralympic Games: 1R (2024)

Abbie Breakwell (born 29 March 2003) is a British wheelchair tennis player. She is a former junior World number two in October 2021 and has reached her highest ranking of World number 33 in August 2022. She competed at the 2024 Summer Paralympics.

Breakwell was diagnosed with Charcot Marie Tooth disease and syringomelia, she is a full-time wheelchair user.
