= Table tennis at the 2024 Summer Paralympics – Men's doubles MD14 =

Men's doubles MD14 at the XVII Paralympic Games
- Venue: South Paris Arena 4, Paris
- Dates: 29 August – 1 September 2024
- Competitors: 24 from 9 nations

Medalists
| 1st place, gold medalist(s) | | Liao Keli; Yan Shuo | China |
| 2nd place, silver medalist(s) | | Rungroj Thainiyom; Phisit Wangphonphathanasiri | Thailand |
| 3rd place, bronze medalist(s) | | Paul Karabardak; Billy Shilton | Great Britain |
| 3rd place, bronze medalist(s) | | Clément Berthier; Esteban Herrault | France |

The men's doubles – Class 14 tournament at the 2024 Summer Paralympics in Paris will take place between 29 August and 1 September 2024 at South Paris Arena 4.

== Schedule ==
The schedule are as below:

| P | Preliminary round | ¼ | Quarter-finals | ½ | Semi-finals | G | Gold medal match |

| Events | Dates | | | | | | | |
| Events | Thu 29 Aug | | Fri 30 Aug | | Sat 31 Aug | | Sun 1 Sep | |
| Events | M | E | M | E | M | E | M | E |
|---|---|---|---|---|---|---|---|---|
| Men's doubles MD14 | P | | | ¼ | ½ | | G | |

== Results ==
=== Gold medal match ===
| Gold medal match |
| 1 | R Thainiyom (THA); P Wangphonphathanasiri (THA) | 11 | 8 | 9 | 7 |
| 4 | Liao KL (CHN); Yan S (CHN) | 6 | 11 | 11 | 11 |

=== Top half ===
Round of 16
12 | K Alabi (NGR); V Farinloye (NGR) | 9 | 5 | 8
5 | Huang JX (CHN); Peng WN (CHN) | 11 | 11 | 11
6 | P Karabardak (GBR); B Shilton (GBR) | 11 | 12 | 11
10 | K Dourbecker (FRA); S Messi (FRA) | 8 | 10 | 4

Quarter-finals
1 | R Thainiyom (THA); P Wangphonphathanasiri (THA) | 6 | 11 | 11 | 11
5 | Huang JX (CHN); Peng WN (CHN) | 11 | 4 | 5 | 6
6 | P Karabardak (GBR); B Shilton (GBR) | 7 | 11 | 11 | 11
3 | P Salmin (BRA); I P Stroh (BRA) | 11 | 9 | 9 | 5

Semi-finals
1 | R Thainiyom (THA); P Wangphonphathanasiri (THA) | 11 | 11 | 11
6 | P Karabardak (GBR); B Shilton (GBR) | 9 | 9 | 7

=== Bottom half ===
Round of 16
9 | M Pino (CHI); I Torres (CHI) | 11 | 15 | 11
7 | J Morales (ESP); Á Valera (ESP) | 5 | 13 | 6
8 | W Bayley (GBR); M Perry (GBR) | 11 | 11 | 11
11 | T Rau (GER); B Schnake (GER) | 9 | 4 | 9

Quarter-finals
4 | Liao KL (CHN); Yan S (CHN) | 11 | 11 | 13
9 | M Pino (CHI); I Torres (CHI) | 4 | 9 | 11
8 | W Bayley (GBR); M Perry (GBR) | 6 | 9 | 11 | 11 | 9
2 | C Berthier (FRA); E Herrault (FRA) | 11 | 11 | 9 | 7 | 11

Semi-finals
4 | Liao KL (CHN); Yan S (CHN) | 13 | 11 | 11
2 | C Berthier (FRA); E Herrault (FRA) | 11 | 7 | 7
