= Ksenia Ovsyannikova =

Russian wheelchair fencer

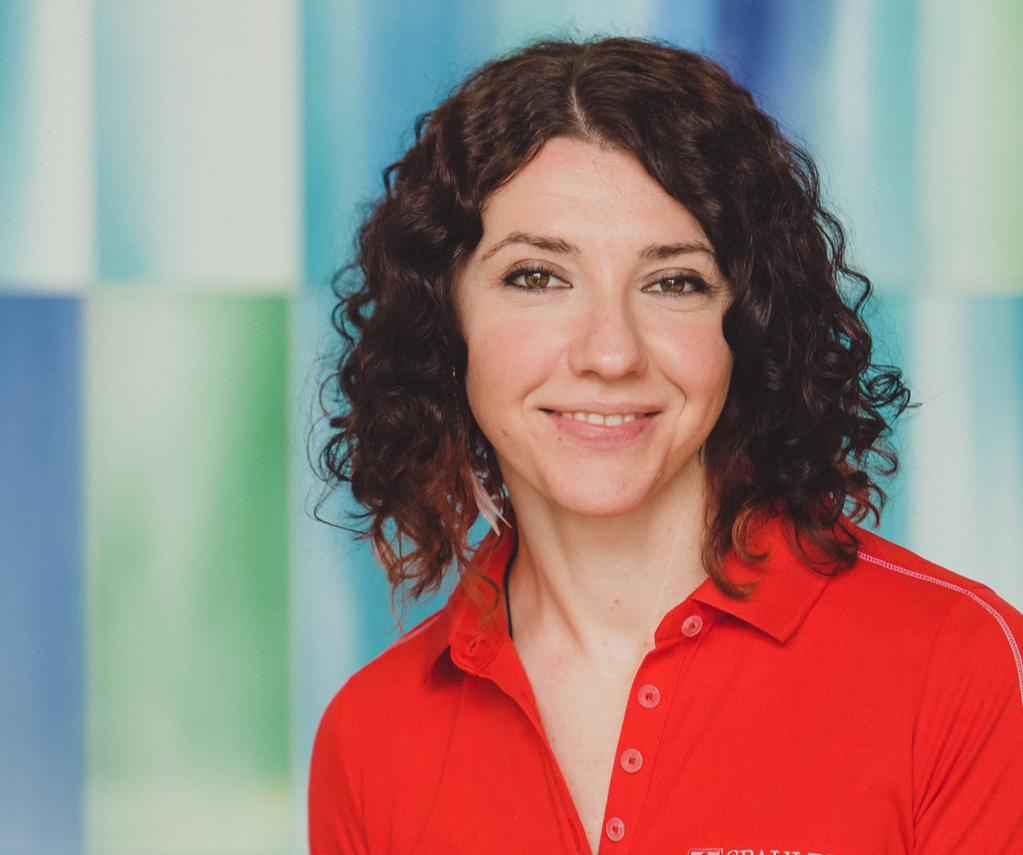
- Born: 5 April 1985 (age 40); Moscow, Soviet Union
- Occupations: Sports administrator and athlete
- Employer: International Wheelchair and Amputee Sports Federation

Ksenia Ovsyannikova (born 5 April 1985) is a Russian world-champion wheelchair fencer and IWAS Wheelchair Executive Committee member.

== Life ==
Ovsyannikova was born in 1985 in Moscow. Her family took her to Mozambique when her father was working in a hospital there. She took to a wheelchair as the result of a diving accident when she was sixteen years old. While she was still recovering from the accident she was offered the chance to take part in sport. She had not had sporting ambitions before the accident but she took to the wheelchair fencing offered by the coach.

Her education was completed at Moscow State Social Humanitarian Institute where she gained a diploma in linguistics and a master's degree in international relations. She became world champion in Hungary in September 2015. She was banned from participating at the 2016 Summer Paralympics in Rio as a result of an International Paralympic Committee ban on the participation of the Russian team following an investigation into and discovery of a state-backed doping program.

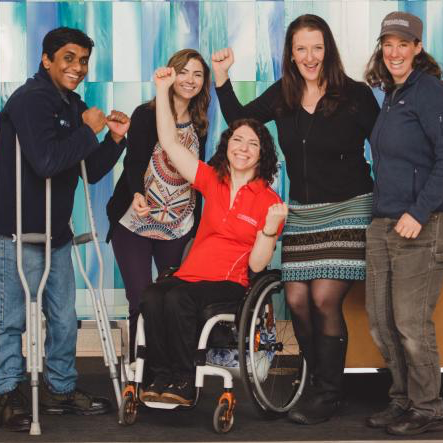
Ovsyannikova and Indian fencer Vibhas Sen (et al.) at the Spaulding Rehabilitation Hospital in Boston

She is an International Wheelchair and Amputee Sports Federation (IWAS) Executive Committee member. In 2017 she toured America as part of the US Department of State Global Sports Mentoring Program. She was with Indian parathlete Vibhas Sen on what was described by the program as a "mission for inclusion". In the same year she beat Ulrike Lotz-Lange of Germany twice at the IWAS Wheelchair Fencing World Championships in Rome where she took gold medals for the foil and the women's épée "C" category event.

During the 2017 World Fencing Championships she was there as Head of the Promotion Commission of IWAS. There was a demonstration of Wheelchair Fencing at the Arena Leipzig Stadium witnessed by Pal Szekeres IWAS Wheelchair Fencing Chairman and Udo Ziegler the IWAS Secretary General.

In 2021 she joined other international representatives including Gemma Collis-McCann on a new Gender Equity Commission set up by Christina Massiala of Greece to look at gender issues relating to Wheelchair Fencing.
