= Piers Gilliver =

British wheelchair fencer

Piers Gilliver MBE
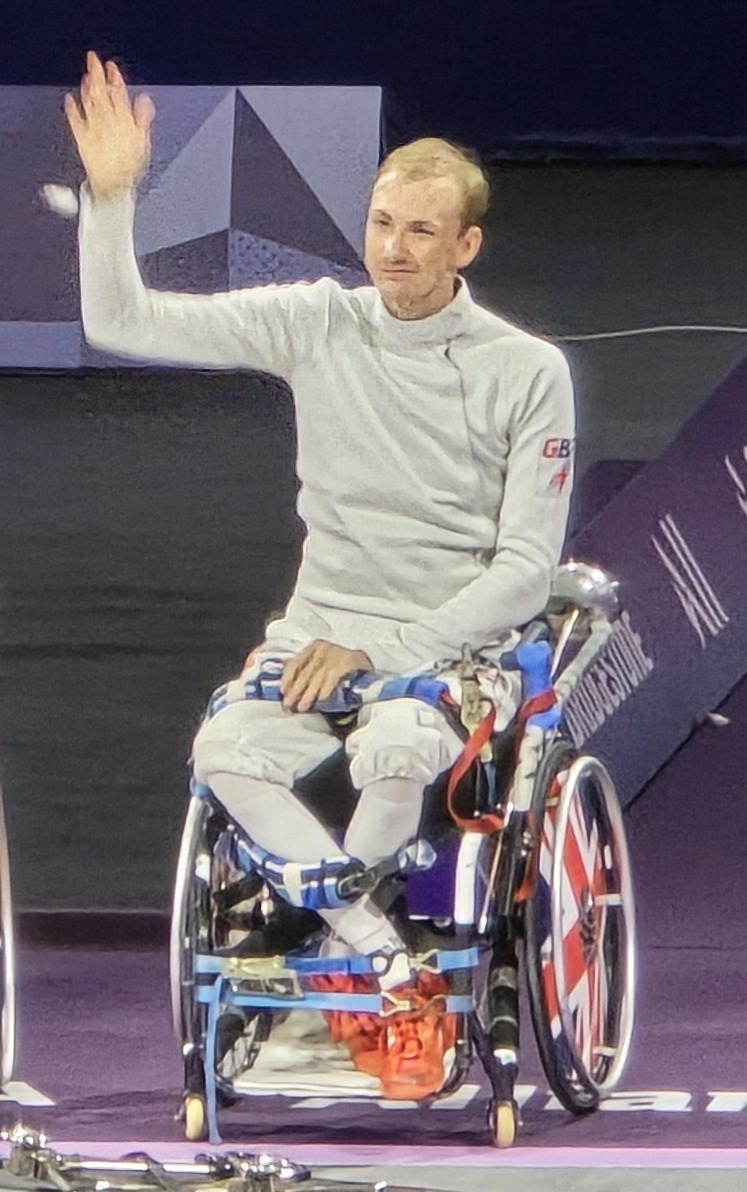

Personal information
- Born: 17 September 1994 (age 31) Gloucester, England

Fencing career
- Sport: Fencing
- Weapon: Épée A / Sabre A
- National coach: Peter Rome
- Club: University of Bath
- Disability class: A
Medal record
Wheelchair fencing
Representing Great Britain
Summer Paralympics
Gold medal – first place	2020 Tokyo	Épée A
Silver medal – second place	2016 Rio de Janeiro	Épée A
Silver medal – second place	2020 Tokyo	Team foil
Silver medal – second place	2024 Paris	Épée A
Silver medal – second place	2024 Paris	Sabre A
Silver medal – second place	2024 Paris	Team foil
Bronze medal – third place	2020 Tokyo	Team épée
Bronze medal – third place	2024 Paris	Team épée
IWAS World Championships
Gold medal – first place	2019 Cheongju	Épée A
Gold medal – first place	2023 Terni	Épée A
Silver medal – second place	2015 Eger	Épée A
Silver medal – second place	2017 Rome	Épée A
Silver medal – second place	2023 Terni	Sabre A
Bronze medal – third place	2017 Rome	Sabre A
Bronze medal – third place	2019 Cheongju	Sabre A
Bronze medal – third place	2019 Cheongju	Épée Team
IWAS European Championships
Gold medal – first place	2024 Paris	Épée A
Gold medal – first place	2024 Paris	Sabre A
Gold medal – first place	2024 Paris	Foil Team
Gold medal – first place	2022 Warsaw	Épée A
Gold medal – first place	2022 Warsaw	Sabre A
Gold medal – first place	2022 Warsaw	Épée Team
Gold medal – first place	2022 Warsaw	Foil Team
Silver medal – second place	2016 Torino	Épée A
Silver medal – second place	2018 Terni	Épée A
Fencing Commonwealth Games
Gold medal – first place	2022 London	Épée A
Gold medal – first place	2022 London	Épée Team

Piers Alexander Gilliver (born 17 September 1994) is a British wheelchair fencer, who competes in both épée and sabre. He is the 2020 Paralympic champion in the Individual Épée, A classification. He is the first British Paralympic champion in the sport since Carol Walton in 1988.

Gilliver has previously won medals at both World and European Championship level. In 2016 he represented Great Britain at the Rio Paralympics and won a silver medal

== Personal history ==
Gilliver was born in Gloucester, England on 17 September 1994. He attended Hopebrook C of E School in Longhope. He has Ehlers–Danlos syndrome, a congenital illness, which in 2007 left him as a full-time wheelchair user.

== Wheelchair fencing career ==
Gilliver first got into wheelchair fencing in 2010 at his local fencing club in Cheltenham after looking for a new sport as his mobility decreased. He joined the British Disabled Fencing Association in 2011. In 2012 Gilliver made his international debut for the British team at a World Cup event in Warsaw, coming 11th in the Category A épée.

In 2013 Gilliver took part in his first IWAS World Championships. The same year he was named Junior World Champion in the U23's Category A épée. In the buildup to the 2016 Summer Paralympics in Rio, Gilliver took nine podium finishes at international matches including the silver medal at the IWAS wheelchair fencing World Championships in Eger. In 2016 he was selected for TeamGB at the 2016 Summer Paralympics where he gained a silver medal in the Épée A.

In July 2021 Gilliver, Dimitri Coutya, Gemma Collis-McCann and Oliver Lam-Watson were identified as the British wheelchair fencing team who would compete at the delayed 2020 Summer Paralympics in Tokyo, where he won gold in the Épée A, silver in the Team Foil and bronze in the Team Épée.

Gilliver was appointed Member of the Order of the British Empire (MBE) in the 2022 New Year Honours for services to fencing.

He won a silver medal at the 2024 Paralympic Games in the Sabre A event.
