= Triathlon at the 2024 Summer Paralympics – Women's PTS4 =

Women's PTS4 at the XVII Paralympic Games
- Venue: Pont Alexandre III
- Dates: 2 September 2024
- Competitors: 15 from 10 nations
- Winning time: 1:14:30

Medalists
1st place, gold medalist(s)		Megan Richter	Great Britain
2nd place, silver medalist(s)		Marta Francés Gómez	Spain
3rd place, bronze medalist(s)		Hannah Moore	Great Britain

The Triathlon at the 2024 Summer Paralympics – Women's PTS4 event at the 2024 Paralympic Games took place at 12:40 CEST on 2 September 2024 at Pont Alexandre III, Paris. Fifteen athletes representing ten nations competed in this event, which also included PTS3 women athletes.

== Venue ==
The triathlon course started and ended at the Pont Alexandre III bridge near Seine River. The race covered a sprint distance and included a 750-meter swim in the Seine, a 20 km para cycling at Champs-Élysées, Avenue Montaigne, crossing the Seine by the Pont des Invalides and reaching Quai d'Orsay. The final leg was 5 km run that concluded back at the Pont Alexandre III bridge.

== Results ==
World Triathlon confirmed the final entry list for the event in August 2024.

Rank	Athlete	Nation	Class	Swim	T1	Bike	T2	Run	Total time	Difference
1st place, gold medalist(s)	Megan Richter	Great Britain	PTS4	13:57	1:21	35:48	0:49	22:35	1:14:30	
2nd place, silver medalist(s)	Marta Francés Gómez	Spain	PTS4	14:03	1:16	36:41	0:52	22:18	1:15:10	+0:40
3rd place, bronze medalist(s)	Hannah Moore	Great Britain	PTS4	11:52	1:34	35:47	0:57	25:51	1:16:01	+1:31
4	Camille Sénéclauze	France	PTS4	14:52	1:07	37:34	0:47	22:23	1:16:43	+2:13
5	Elise Marc	France	PTS3	15:49	1:39	37:37	0:38	21:17	1:17:00	+2:30
6	Anna Plotnikova	Neutral Paralympic Athletes	PTS3	16:56	1:19	38:06	0:42	21:46	1:18:49	+4:19
7	Sally Pilbeam	Australia	PTS4	17:45	1:27	37:30	0:30	22:28	1:19:40	+5:10
8	Kirsty Weir	South Africa	PTS4	19:49	1:18	38:49	0:41	20:37	1:21:14	+6:44
9	Emma Meyers	United States	PTS4	14:01	1:23	40:44	0:43	24:53	1:21:44	+7:14
10	Elke van Engelen	Germany	PTS4	18:18	1:54	36:29	0:51	24:18	1:21:50	+7:20
11	Kenia Villalobos	Mexico	PTS3	13:59	1:15	40:55	0:44	26:00	1:22:53	+8:23
12	Cassie Cava	Ireland	PTS3	14:22	1:51	42:22	0:58	37:56	1:37:29	+22:59
13	Rachel Watts	United States	PTS3	24:01	1:41	42:45	1:14	32:34	1:42:15	+27:45
	Grace Brimelow	Australia	PTS4	~~11:42~~	~~1:07~~	~~38:14~~	~~0:52~~	~~26:29~~	~~1:18:24~~	DSQ
	Kelly Elmlinger	United States	PTS4	Did not start						
