= Liao Keli =

Chinese para table tennis player

Personal information
- Born: 5 January 1990 (age 36) Yuzhong District, Chongqing, China

Sport
- Sport: Table tennis
Medal record
Men's para table tennis
Representing China
Paralympic Games
Gold medal – first place	2020 Tokyo	Team C6–7
Gold medal – first place	2024 Paris	Doubles MD14
Bronze medal – third place	2020 Tokyo	Singles C7
Asian Para Games
Gold medal – first place	2010 Guangzhou	Singles C6-7
Gold medal – first place	2014 Incheon	Singles C7
Gold medal – first place	2014 Incheon	Team C6-7
Silver medal – second place	2022 Hangzhou	Singles C7
Silver medal – second place	2022 Hangzhou	Doubles MD14

Liao Keli (Chinese: 廖 克力; born 5 January 1990) is a Chinese para table tennis player.

== Career ==
He won one of the bronze medals in the men's individual C7 event at the 2020 Summer Paralympics held in Tokyo, Japan. He also won the gold medal in the men's team C6–7 event.
