= Cycling at the 2020 Summer Paralympics – Men's road time trial C3 =

Men's road time trial C3 at the XVI Paralympic Games
- Venue: Fuji Speedway
- Dates: 31 August 2021
- Competitors: 14 from 11 nations
- Winning time: 35:00.82

Medalists
1st place, gold medalist(s)		Benjamin Watson	Great Britain
2nd place, silver medalist(s)		Steffen Warias	Germany
3rd place, bronze medalist(s)		Matthias Schindler	Germany

The men's time trial class C3 road cycling event at the 2020 Summer Paralympics took place on 31 August 2021 at Fuji Speedway, Japan. 14 riders from 11 different nations competed in this event.

The C3 classification is for cyclists with moderate hemiplegic or diplegic spasticity; moderate athetosis or ataxia; bilateral below knee or unilateral through knee amputation, etcetera.

== Results ==
The event took place on 31 August 2021, at 14:21:

Rank	Rider	Nationality	Time	Deficit
1st place, gold medalist(s)	Benjamin Watson	Great Britain	35:00.82	
2nd place, silver medalist(s)	Steffen Warias	Germany	35:57.41	+56.59
3rd place, bronze medalist(s)	Matthias Schindler	Germany	36:17.95	+1:17.13
4	Finlay Graham	Great Britain	36:20.86	+1:20.04
5	Eduardo Santas Asensio	Spain	36:43.11	+1:42.29
6	Jaco van Gass	Great Britain	36:45.31	+1:44.49
7	Masaki Fujita	Japan	36:47.63	+1:46.81
8	David Nicholas	Australia	36:56.79	+1:55.97
9	Fabio Anobile	Italy	37:54.37	+2:53.55
10	Alejandro Perea Arango	Colombia	38:25.24	+3:24.42
11	Daniel Strandberg	Sweden	38:37.17	+3:36.35
12	Diederick Schelfhout	Belgium	38:54.84	+3:54.02
13	Henry Raabe	Costa Rica	39:37.64	+4:36.82
14	Joseph Berenyi	United States	42:16.36	+7:15.54
