= Marta Francés =

Spanish paratriathlete (born 1995)

Personal information
- Full name: Marta Francés Gómez
- Born: 3 April 1996 (age 30) Puertollano, Spain

Sport
- Country: Spain
- Sport: Paratriathlon
- Disability class: PTS4
Medal record
Women's paratriathlon
Representing Spain
Paralympic Games
Silver medal – second place	2024 Paris	PTS4
World Championships
Gold medal – first place	2024 Torremolinos	PTS4
Silver medal – second place	2021 Abu Dhabi	PTS4
Silver medal – second place	2023 Ponteverde	PTS4
Bronze medal – third place	2022 Abu Dhabi	PTS4
European Championships
Gold medal – first place	2021 Valencia	PTS4
Gold medal – first place	2023 Madrid	PTS4
Silver medal – second place	2022 Olsztyn	PTS4
Silver medal – second place	2024 Vichy	PTS4

Marta Francés Gómez (born 14 June 1995) is a Spanish paratriathlete. She represented Spain at the 2024 Summer Paralympics.

== Career ==
Francés represented Spain at the 2024 Summer Paralympics and won a silver medal in the PTS4 event.
