= Masaki Fujita =

Japanese para-cyclist (born 1985)

Personal information
- Native name: 藤田征樹
- Born: 17 January 1985 (age 41) Wakkanai, Japan

Sport
- Sport: Para-cycling
- Disability class: C3
Medal record
Event	1st	2nd	3rd
Paralympic Games	0	3	2
Track World Championships	1	3	1
Road World Championships	1	0	0
Asian Para Games	2	0	1
Total	4	6	4
Representing Japan
Men's para-cycling
Paralympic Games
Silver medal – second place	2008 Beijing	Kilo LC 3–4
Silver medal – second place	2008 Beijing	Individual pursuit LC3
Silver medal – second place	2016 Rio de Janeiro	Road time trial C3
Bronze medal – third place	2008 Beijing	Road time trial LC3
Bronze medal – third place	2012 London	Road time trial C3
Track World Championships
Gold medal – first place	2009 Manchester	Time trial LC3
Silver medal – second place	2007 Bordeaux	Time trial LC3
Silver medal – second place	2009 Manchester	3km pursuit LC3
Silver medal – second place	2015 Apeldoorn	Individual pursuit C3
Bronze medal – third place	2024 Rio de Janeiro	Scratch race C3
Road World Championships
Gold medal – first place	2015 Nottwil	Road Race C3
Asian Para Games
Gold medal – first place	2022 Hangzhou	Individual pursuit C3
Gold medal – first place	2022 Hangzhou	Road time trial C1–3
Bronze medal – third place	2022 Hangzhou	Road race C1–3
Men's paratriathlon
Asian Championships
Gold medal – first place	2025 Chiba City	PTS3

Masaki Fujita (藤田 征樹, Fujita Masaki; born 17 January 1985) is a Japanese para-cyclist who competes in road and track events.

== Career ==
Fujita has won five medals at the Summer Paralympic Games. Two silver medals and a bronze medal at the 2008 Summer Paralympics, a bronze medal at the 2012 Summer Paralympics in the road time trial C3 event, and a silver medal at the 2016 Summer Paralympics in the road time trial C3 event.

He represented Japan at the 2020 Summer Paralympics and finished in sixth place in the road race C1–3, seventh place in the road time trial C3, eighth place in the individual pursuit C3, and 14th place in the time trial C1–3 event.

In October 2023, he competed at the 2022 Asian Para Games in cycling and won gold medals in the individual pursuit C3 and road time trial C1–3, and a bronze medal in the road race C1–3 events.

In March 2024, he represented Japan at the 2024 UCI Para-cycling Track World Championships and won a bronze medal in the scratch race C3 event. In September 2024, he then competed at the 2024 Summer Paralympics and finished in seventh place in the road time trial C3 and 15th place in the road race C1–3 events.
