= Hannah Moore (paratriathlete) =

British paratriathlete (born 1996)

Personal information
- Born: 5 October 1996 (age 29)
- Home town: Loughborough, U.K.

Sport
- Country: Great Britain
- Sport: Paratriathlon
- Disability class: PTS4
Medal record
Women's paratriathlon
Representing Great Britain
Paralympic Games
Bronze medal – third place	2024 Paris	PTS4
World Championships
Gold medal – first place	2018 Gold Coast	PTS4
Gold medal – first place	2019 Lausanne	PTS4
European Championships
Gold medal – first place	2018 Tartu	PTS4
Bronze medal – third place	2023 Madrid	PTS4

Hannah Moore (born 5 October 1996) is a British paratriathlete. She represented Great Britain at the 2024 Summer Paralympics.

== Career ==
Moore represented Great Britain at the 2024 Summer Paralympics and won a bronze medal in the PTS4 event.
