= Thomas Peyroton-Dartet =

French cyclist (born 1985)

Personal information
- Born: 9 July 1985 (age 41) Muret, France

Cycling career
- Sport: Cycling
- Disciplines: Road track
- Role: Rider
Medal record
Representing France
Paralympic Games
Gold medal – first place	2024 Paris	Time trial C3
Silver medal – second place	2024 Paris	Road race C1–3
Road World Championships
Silver medal – second place	2025 Ronse	Road race C3

Thomas Peyroton-Dartet (born 9 July 1985) is a French para-cyclist.

== Career ==
Peyroton-Dartet began competing at the age of thirteen. He is the son of a police officer.

In 2017, Peyroton-Dartet was the victim of a serious accident with a scooter while participating in the Tour de Tahiti. Suffering from multiple facial fractures and a brain hematoma, he returned to competition seven months later. In 2021, he suffered another fall during training when he hit a car stopped in the middle of the road. Disabled by cerebellar ataxia, he continues to practice cycling and paracycling events.

Peyroton-Dartet was European road racing champion in 2022 and vice-world champion in 2023. He joined the police in 2010, where he is part of the sports team. He has qualified for the 2024 Paralympic Games in the road and track events in the C3 category. and won.

In October 2026, Peyroton-Dartet was provisionally suspended pending further investigation after testing positive for EPO. The test had taken place during the 2026 UCI Para-cycling Road World Championships at which Peyroton-Dartet had placed first in the C3 road race.
