= Esteban Herrault =

French para table tennis player

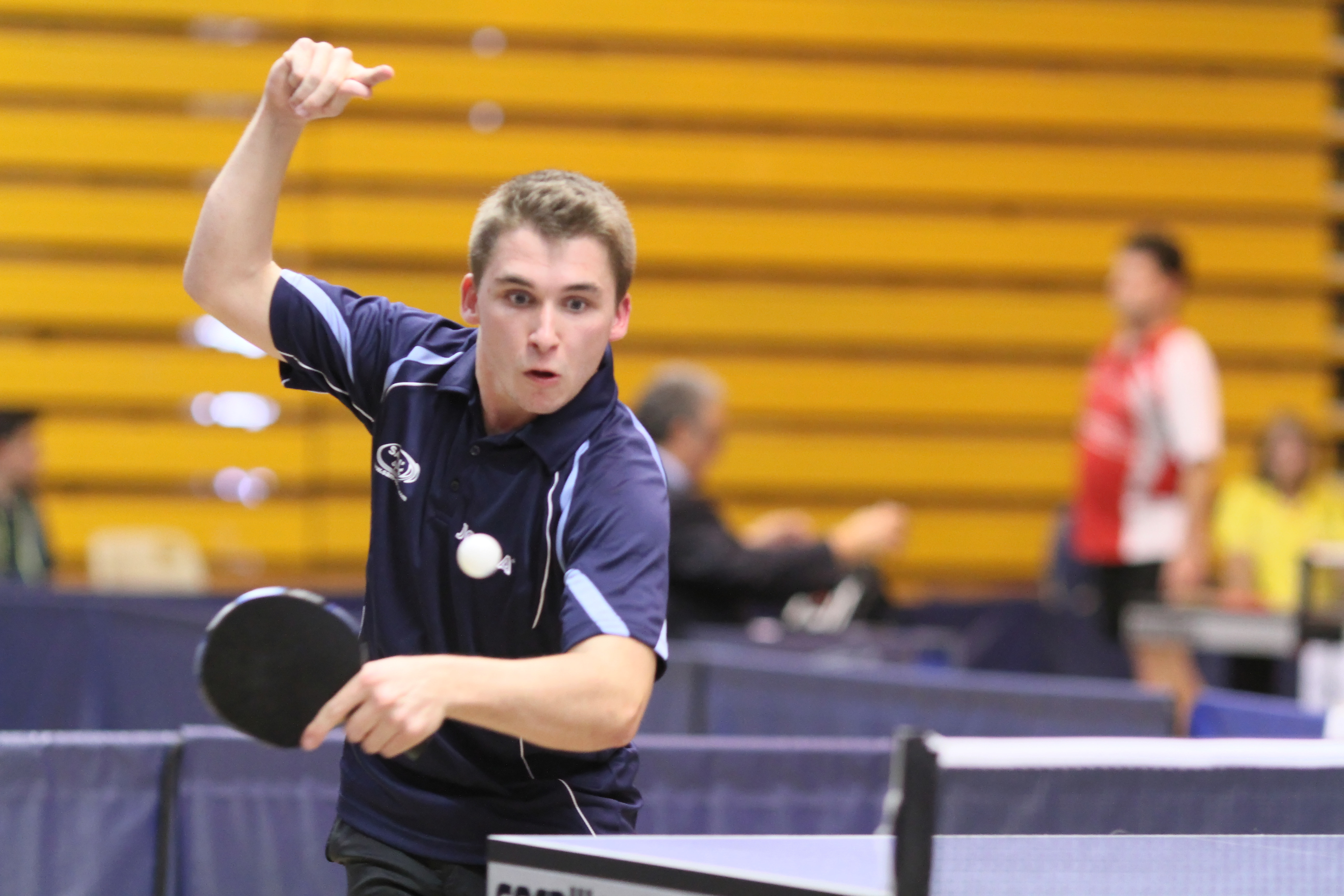
- Esteban Herrault playing table tennis

Personal information
- Born: 18 September 1993 (age 32)
- Home town: Tours, France

Sport
- Sport: Para table tennis
- Disability class: C6
Medal record
Para table tennis
Representing France
Paralympic Games
Bronze medal – third place	2024 Paris	Men's doubles MD14

Esteban Herrault (born 18 September 1993) is a French para table tennis player. He represented France at the 2024 Summer Paralympics.

== Career ==
Herrault represented France at the 2024 Summer Paralympics in the men's doubles MD14 event, along with Clément Berthier, and won a bronze medal.
