= Clément Berthier =

French para table tennis player

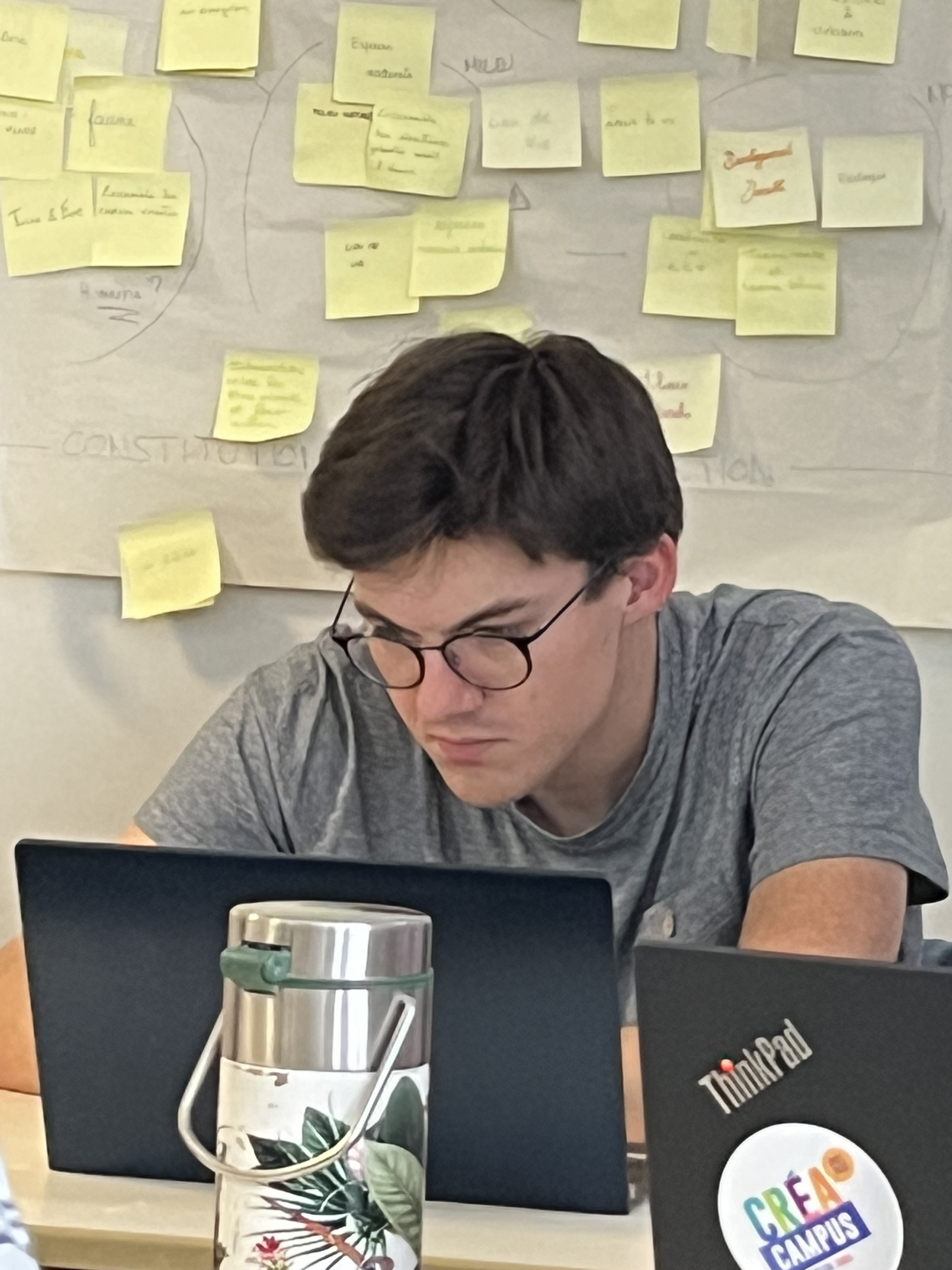
- Clément Berthier at school

Personal information
- Born: 3 February 2000 (age 26) Lille, France

Sport
- Sport: Para table tennis
- Disability class: C8
Medal record
Para table tennis
Representing France
Paralympic Games
Bronze medal – third place	2024 Paris	Men's doubles MD14

Clément Berthier (born 3 February 2000) is a French para table tennis player. He represented France at the 2024 Summer Paralympics.

== Career ==
Berthier represented France at the 2024 Summer Paralympics in the men's doubles MD14 event, along with Esteban Herrault, and won a bronze medal.
