= Phisit Wangphonphathanasiri =

Thai para table tennis player

Personal information
- Native name: พิสิษฐ์ หวังผลพัฒนศิริ
- Born: 1 January 1987 (age 39) Bangkok, Thailand

Sport
- Sport: Table tennis
- Disability class: 8
Medal record
Men's para table tennis
Representing Thailand
Paralympic Games
Silver medal – second place	2024 Paris	Doubles MD14
Bronze medal – third place	2024 Paris	Singles C8
World Championships
Silver medal – second place	2022 Granada	Doubles MD14
Asian Para Games
Gold medal – first place	2022 Hangzhou	Doubles MD14
Silver medal – second place	2018 Jakarta	Teams C8
Bronze medal – third place	2018 Jakarta	Singles C8
Bronze medal – third place	2022 Hangzhou	Singles C8
Bronze medal – third place	2022 Hangzhou	Mixed doubles XD14

Phisit Wangphonphathanasiri (Thai: พิสิษฐ์ หวังผลพัฒนศิริ; born 1 January 1987) is a Thai para table tennis player. He competed at the 2024 Summer Paralympics and reached the gold medal match of the men's doubles MD14 event with Rungroj Thainiyom.
