= Oliver Lam-Watson =

British wheelchair fencer

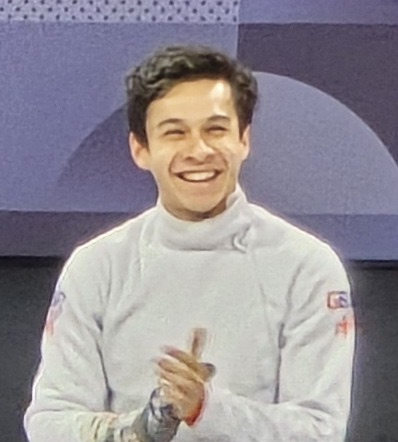

Personal information
- Born: 7 November 1992 (age 33)
Medal record
Men's wheelchair fencing
Representing Great Britain
Paralympic Games
Silver medal – second place	2020 Tokyo	Team foil
Silver medal – second place	2024 Paris	Team foil
Bronze medal – third place	2020 Tokyo	Team épée
Bronze medal – third place	2024 Paris	Team épée

Oliver Kai Lam-Watson (born 7 November 1992) is a British wheelchair fencer. He won bronze in the Men's team épée and silver in the Men's team foil at the 2020 Paralympic Games in Tokyo.

In his personal life he is a user of social media, using various online social media platforms, Oliver was excited to announce his return to the Paralympics in Paris 2024 representing Great Britain in wheelchair fencing. He was also the first person featured in the 2024 Paris advertisement for Aldi grocery stores.

Another personal challenge of Lam-Watsons' has been his hunt for a National championships medal in the Foil discipline despite having obtained medals at International and Paralympic level.

== Early life ==
Lam Watson's late mother was from Hong Kong.
