= Matthias Schindler =

German para-cyclist

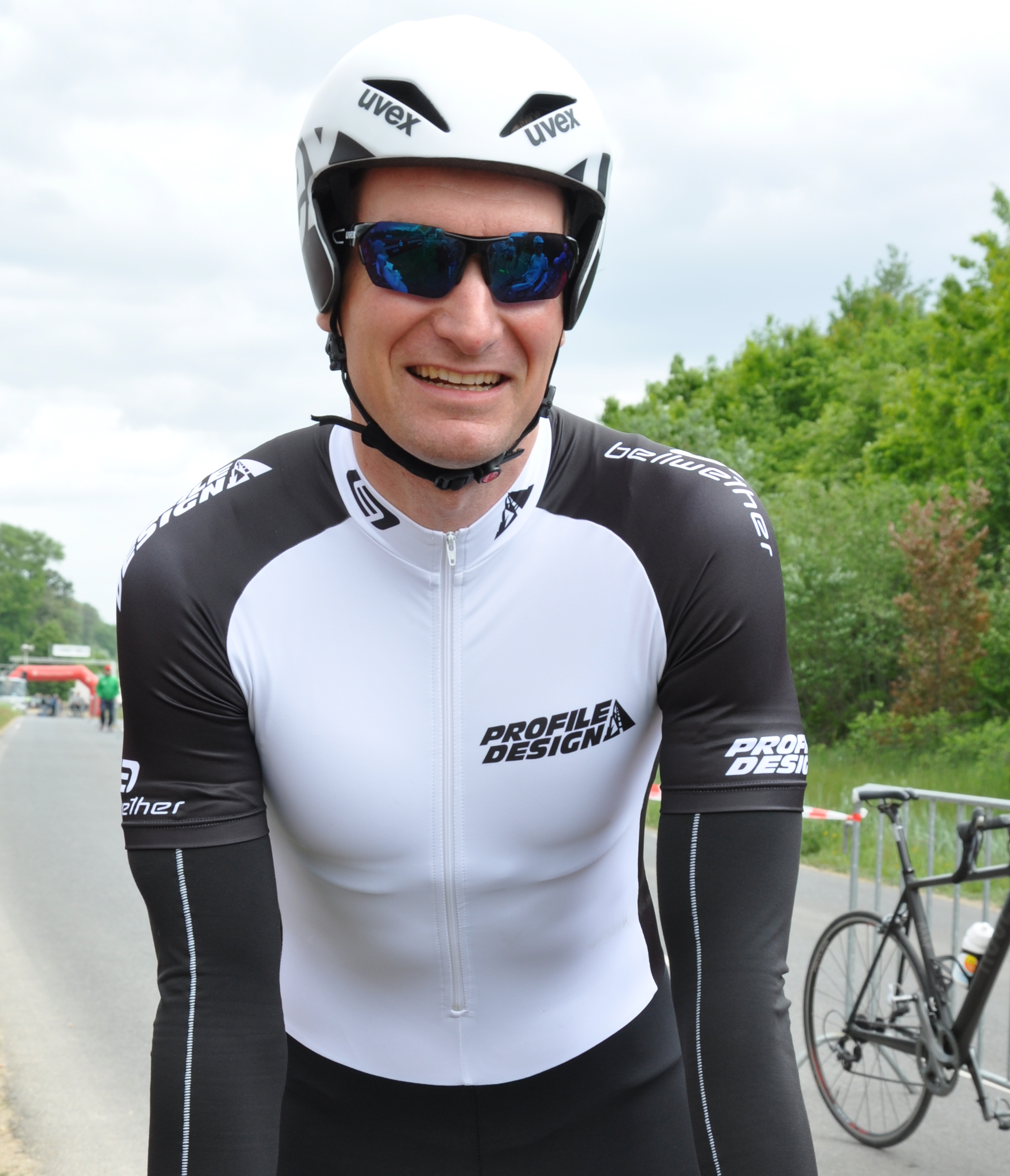

Personal information
- Nationality: German
- Born: 28 March 1982 (age 44) Regensburg, Germany

Sport
- Sport: Para-cycling
- Disability class: C3
Medal record
Men's para-cycling
Representing Germany
Paralympic Games
Bronze medal – third place	2020 Tokyo	Road time trial C3
Bronze medal – third place	2024 Paris	Road time trial C3
Road World Championships
Gold medal – first place	2023 Glasgow	Time trial C3
Silver medal – second place	2021 Cascais	Time trial C3
European Championships
Gold medal – first place	2023 Rotterdam	Time trial C3

Matthias Schindler (born 28 March 1982) is a German para-cyclist who represented Germany at the 2020 Summer Paralympics.

== Career ==
Schindler represented Germany in the men's road time trial C3 event at the 2020 Summer Paralympics and won a bronze medal.
