= Ben Watson (cyclist) =

British para cyclist

Benjamin Watson MBE
Personal information
- Nationality: British
- Born: Benjamin Michael Watson; 11 June 1989 (age 37) Stockport, Greater Manchester, England
- Home town: Manchester, England

Sport
- Country: Great Britain
- Sport: Cycling
- Club: Para-T
- Coached by: Andrew Pink
Medal record
Men's Para-cycling
Representing Great Britain
Paralympic Games
Gold medal – first place	2020 Tokyo	Time trial C3
Gold medal – first place	2020 Tokyo	Road race C1–3
Road World Championships
Silver medal – second place	2024 Zurich	Road race C3
Bronze medal – third place	2019 Emmen	Road time trial C3
Bronze medal – third place	2018 Maniago	Road time trial C3
Bronze medal – third place	2023 Glasgow	Road race C3
Track World Championships
Silver medal – second place	2018 Rio de Janeiro	Scratch C3

Benjamin Michael Watson (born 11 June 1989) is a British para cyclist competing in road, time trial and track cycling events in the C3 category.

== Cycling career ==
Watson has been part of the Great Britain Cycling Team since early 2017.

In 2018 Watson finished second at the UCI World Para-cycling Track Championships in Rio de Janeiro. In the World Road Championships C3 individual time trial he has won bronze both in the 2018 and 2019. Watson won the C3 road race in Yorkshire 2019, which was the first time a para-cycling race took place alongside the UCI Road World Championships.

In 2021 Watson became Paralympic double Champion when he won the Gold Medal in the C3 Men's Time Trial, and the men's C1-3 road race at the Tokyo 2020 Paralympics.

At the 2022 world championships, Watson won the bronze medal in the time trial, behind gold medal winner Finlay Graham.

Watson was appointed Member of the Order of the British Empire (MBE) in the 2022 New Year Honours for services to cycling.

At the 2023 world championships, Watson won the bronze medal in the C3 road race.

Watson was selected to represent Great Britain at the 2024 Summer Paralympics. He finished 5th in the C1-3 road race and 4th in the time trial.
