= Dimitri Coutya =

British wheelchair fencer

Dimitri Coutya MBE
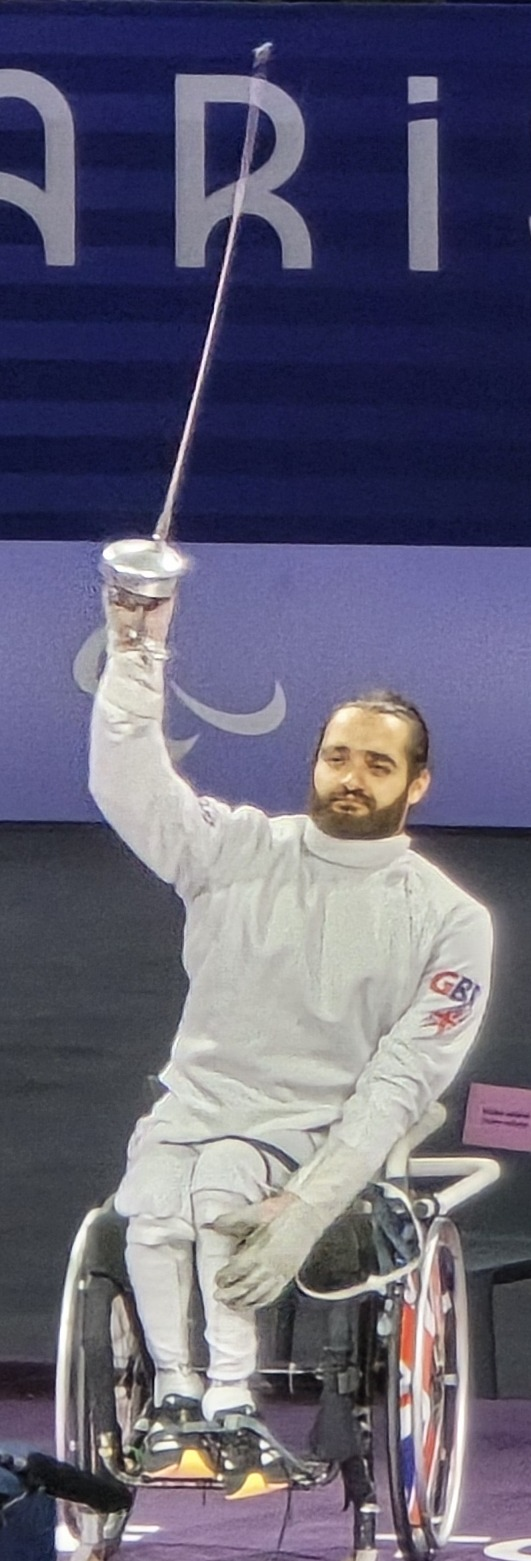

Personal information
- Born: 7 October 1997 (age 28) London, England

Fencing career
- Sport: Fencing
- Weapon: Épée B / Foil B
- National coach: Glen Golding
- Club: University of Bath
Medal record
Men's wheelchair fencing
Representing Great Britain
Summer Paralympics
Gold medal – first place	2024 Paris	Épée B
Gold medal – first place	2024 Paris	Foil B
Silver medal – second place	2024 Paris	Team foil
Bronze medal – third place	2024 Paris	Team épée
Silver medal – second place	2020 Tokyo	Team Foil
Bronze medal – third place	2020 Tokyo	Foil B
Bronze medal – third place	2020 Tokyo	Team épée
Bronze medal – third place	2020 Tokyo	Épée B
IWAS World Championships
Gold medal – first place	2025 Iksan	Foil B
Bronze medal – third place	2025 Iksan	Épée B
Silver medal – second place	2024 Terni	Épée B
Bronze medal – third place	2024 Terni	Foil B
Gold medal – first place	2019 Cheongju	Épée B
Silver medal – second place	2019 Cheongju	Foil B
Gold medal – first place	2017 Rome	Épée B
Gold medal – first place	2017 Rome	Foil B
Silver medal – second place	2015 Eger	Foil B
IWAS European Championships
Gold medal – first place	2024 Paris	Épée B
Gold medal – first place	2024 Paris	Foil B
Gold medal – first place	2024 Paris	Team foil B
Silver medal – second place	2024 Paris	Sabre B
Bronze medal – third place	2024 Paris	Team épée B
Gold medal – first place	2022 Warsaw	Foil B
Gold medal – first place	2022 Warsaw	Épée B
Gold medal – first place	2022 Warsaw	Team Foil
Gold medal – first place	2022 Warsaw	Team épée
Gold medal – first place	2018 Terni	Épée B
Bronze medal – third place	2018 Terni	Foil B
Silver medal – second place	2016 Torino	Foil B
Bronze medal – third place	2016 Torino	Épée B

Dimitri Coutya, MBE (born 7 October 1997) is a British wheelchair fencer. He is the Cat B Wheelchair Fencing Champion for Individual Foil and Individual Épée at the Paris 2024 Summer Paralympics. He won a team silver, a team bronze and two individual bronze medals for Great Britain in Wheelchair fencing at the 2020 Summer Paralympics at the Makuhari Messe, Tokyo, Japan.

Fencing internationally in Épée Cat B and Foil Cat B, he won a total of 82 Men Single International Individual medals for GBR.

After reaching the Épée quarter final in Rio 2016, Coutya won two world championships golds in Rome 2017. He won his first European championships Gold in 2018 in Terni - Italy. At the 2019 world championships in Cheong Ju - South Korea, Coutya won a Gold in Épée and a Silver in Foil.

During the preparations for the Paris 2024 Paralympics, Coutya won 7 European Titles, World Championship Bronze and Silver medals (Terni 2023 - Italy), and his first European Sabre medal, a Silver in the Paris 2024 European Championship.

For several years Coutya has been ranked world no.1 in both Wheelchair Fencing Cat B Épée and Cat B Foil.

On 3 July 2024, Coutya became the first British Fencing athlete to be selected for the Paralympics, to fence in all three individual weapons (Sabre, Foil and Épée).

In the Paris 2024 Summer Pralympics, Coutya became the first Brit to win an Individual Foil Gold since Cyril Thomas in Tokyo 1964. He followed that with an Individual Épée Gold taking Paralympics GB's overall gold medal tally to surpass Tokyo's 41 medals.
