= Triathlon at the Summer Paralympics =

- Events: 8 (men: 4; women: 4)

Games
- 1960; 1964; 1968; 1972; 1976; 1980; 1984; 1988; 1992; 1996; 2000; 2004; 2008; 2012; 2016; 2020; 2024
- Medalists

Triathlon debuted at the 2016 Summer Paralympics held in Rio de Janeiro, Brazil.

Para triathlon is a variant of the triathlon for athletes with a variety of physical disabilities. The sport is governed by World Triathlon. The Paralympic event is a sprint race consisting of 750 m swimming, 20 km cycling and 5 km running stages. Athletes of both sexes compete in six categories according to the nature of their physical impairments. Some classifications allow for helpers in transition, while others allow for sighted pilot-guides throughout the race.

== 2016 ==
The Triathlon debuted at the 2016 Summer Paralympics held in Rio de Janeiro, Brazil.

=== Medals ===
Event	Gold	Silver	Bronze
Men's individual PT1	Jetze Plat; Netherlands	Geert Schipper; Netherlands	Giovanni Achenza; Italy
Men's individual PT2	Andrew Lewis; Great Britain	Michele Ferrarin; Italy	Mohamed Lahna; Morocco
Men's individual PT4	Martin Schulz; Germany	Stefan Daniel; Canada	Jairo Ruiz Lopez; Spain
Women's individual PT2	Allysa Seely; United States	Hailey Danisewicz; United States	Melissa Stockwell; United States
Women's individual PT4	Grace Norman; United States	Lauren Steadman; Great Britain	Gwladys Lemoussu; France
Women's individual PT5	Katie Kelly; Australia	Alison Patrick; Great Britain	Melissa Reid; Great Britain

== 2020 ==
The Triathlon returned to the program at the 2020 Summer Paralympics in Tokyo, Japan. Classifications have been slightly amended in the interim, allowing for the introduction of a tandem-bike based triathlon for visually impaired athletes with guides.

Event	Class	Gold	Silver	Bronze
Men	PTWC	Jetze Plat; Netherlands	Florian Brungraber; Austria	Giovanni Achenza; Italy
Men	PTS4	Alexis Hanquinquant; France	Hideki Uda; Japan	Alejandro Sánchez Palomero; Spain
Men	PTS5	Martin Schulz; Germany	George Peasgood; Great Britain	Stefan Daniel; Canada
Men	PTVI	United States; Bradley Snyder; Guide: Greg Billington	Spain; Héctor Catalá Laparra; Guide: Gustavo Rodríguez Iglesias	Japan; Satoru Yoneoka; Guide: Kohei Tsubaki
Women	PTWC	Kendall Gretsch; United States	Lauren Parker; Australia	Eva Moral; Spain
Women	PTS2	Allysa Seely; United States	Hailey Danz; United States	Veronica Yoko Plebani; Italy
Women	PTS5	Lauren Steadman; Great Britain	Grace Norman; United States	Claire Cashmore; Great Britain
Women	PTVI	Spain; Susana Rodríguez; Guide: Sara Loehr	Italy; Anna Barbaro; Guide: Charlotte Bonin	France; Annouck Curzillat; Guide: Céline Bousrez

== 2024 ==
Event	Class	Gold	Silver	Bronze
Men	PTWC	Jetze Plat; Netherlands	Florian Brungraber; Austria	Geert Schipper; Netherlands
Men	PTS2	Jules Ribstein; France	Mohamed Lahna; United States	Mark Barr; United States
Men	PTS3	Daniel Molina; Spain	Max Gelhaar; Germany	Nico Van Der Burgt; Netherlands
Men	PTS4	Alexis Hanquinquant; France	Carson Clough; United States	Nil Riudavets; Spain
Men	PTS5	Chris Hammer; United States	Disqualified|	Martin Schulz; Germany
Men	PTVI	Dave Ellis; Great Britain	Thibaut Rigaudeau; France	Antoine Perel; France
Women	PTWC	Lauren Parker; Australia	Kendall Gretsch; United States	Leanne Taylor; Canada
Women	PTS2	Hailey Danz; United States	Veronica Yoko Plebani; Italy	Allysa Seely; United States
Women	PTS4	Megan Richter; Great Britain	Marta Francés; Spain	Hannah Moore; Great Britain
Women	PTS5	Grace Norman; United States	Claire Cashmore; Great Britain	Lauren Steadman; Great Britain
Women	PTVI	Susana Rodríguez; Spain	Francesca Tarantello; Italy	Anja Renner; Germany

== Medal table ==
Updated after the 2024 Summer Paralympics.

Rank	Nation	Gold	Silver	Bronze	Total
1	United States (USA)	8	6	3	17
2	Great Britain (GBR)	4	4	4	12
3	Spain (ESP)	3	2	4	9
4	France (FRA)	3	1	3	7
5	Netherlands (NED)	3	1	2	6
6	Germany (GER)	2	1	2	5
7	Australia (AUS)	2	1	0	3
8	Italy (ITA)	0	4	3	7
9	Austria (AUT)	0	2	0	2
10	Canada (CAN)	0	1	2	3
11	Japan (JPN)	0	1	1	2
12	Morocco (MAR)	0	0	1	1
Totals (12 entries)		25	24	25	74

== See also ==
- Triathlon at the Summer Olympics
