= Triathlon at the 2016 Summer Paralympics =

Triathlon at the XV Paralympic Games
- Venue: Fort Copacabana
- Dates: 10–12 September 2016
- Competitors: 60 in six events

The triathlon competitions at the 2016 Summer Paralympics in Rio de Janeiro took place from 10 to 12 September 2016 at Fort Copacabana. Sixty athletes competed across two genders, and six events. This was the first Paralympic Games to feature para triathlon, one of two new sports (along with para canoe) added to the schedule for 2016.

== Format ==
The Paralympic triathlon contained three components; a 750 m (820 yd) swim, 20 km (12 mi) cycle, and a 5 km (3.1 mi) run. The competition took the form of a single event between all competitors with no heats. The competition took place across four of the five recognised para triathlon classifications; both genders competed in the PT2 and PT4 classifications, the PT1 category for men only, where wheelchair athletes used handcycles on the cycling leg, and racing wheelchairs on the run leg, and the PT5 category for women only, where women with visual impairments were assisted by a sighted guide, using a tandem bicycle on the cycling leg; as with other events for blind and visually impaired athletes, any guide did not count as a quota athlete but was awarded a medal as appropriate.

No competition was held in the PT3 classification in 2016.

Triathlon at the 2016 Summer Paralympics - Classification and events
| Classification | Description | Men's Event | Women's Event |
|---|---|---|---|
| PT1 | Athletes with mobility impairments that render them incapable of safely running or pedalling a bicycle. They must have a classification assessment score of up to 640,0 points. Athletes must use a recumbent handcycle during the cycling stage and a racing wheelchair for the running phase of the race. | ● | no women's event was held in this classification |
| PT2 | Athletes with mobility impairments that have a classification assessment score of up to 454,9 points. Amputees may use approved prostheses or supportive devices during the running and cycling stages. | ● | ● |
| PT3 | Athletes with mobility impairments such as muscle power, limb deficiency, hypertonia, ataxia or athetosis that have a classification assessment score from 455,0 to 494,9 points. Athletes may use approved prostheses or supportive devices during the running and cycling stages. | no event was held in this classification | |
| PT4 | Athletes with mobility impairments such as muscle power, limb deficiency, hypertonia, ataxia or athetosis that have a classification assessment score from 495,0 to 557,0 points. Athletes may use approved prostheses or supportive devices during the running and cycling stages. | ● | ● |
| PT5 | Athletes with a visual impairment. All qualifying levels of visual impairment, IBSA/IPC defined sub-classes B1, B2, and B3, are grouped together in this classification. Athletes must have a sighted guide of the same gender and nationality during the entire race and use a tandem bicycle during the cycling stage. The guide will not be counted towards a quota, but will be eligible to receive a medal. | no men's event was held in this classification | ● |

== Qualification ==
In 2016, the field was largely selected on the basis of rankings, although spaces were reserved for the nation represented by the 2015 World Champion in each classification, two host nation athletes, and eight selections from the Bipartite Commission. If host nation athletes qualified using the ITU Rankings criteria, the host nation places were reduced, and awarded instead by the Bipartite Commission.

A National Paralympic Committee (NPC) was allowed to allocated a maximum of two qualification slots per medal event for a maximum total of twelve qualification slots in 2016. Exceptions were made via the Bipartite Commission Invitation Allocation method.

To be eligible for selection by an NPC, athletes had to:

- be ranked on the ITU Paralympic Qualification List closing 30 June 2016;
- be internationally classified with either of the following -
  - 'Confirmed' sport class status
  - 'Review' sport class status with a review date after 31 December 2016.

Ten places, not including guides in the PT5 classification, were available for each of the six events, awarded as follows:

Triathlon at the 2016 Summer Paralympics - Qualification
| Qualification event | Number | PT1 | PT2 | PT4 |
| Qualification event | Number | Men | | |
|---|---|---|---|---|
| 2015 ITU World Championships 19 September 2015 (United States) Chicago | 1 per event | Australia (AUS) | Italy (ITA) | Canada (CAN) |
| 2016 ITU Paralympic Qualification List | 6 per event | United States (USA); Netherlands (NED); Netherlands (NED); Italy (ITA); Brazil (BRA); Great Britain (GBR) | France (FRA); United States (USA); Morocco (MAR); Australia (AUS); Great Britain (GBR); Great Britain (GBR) | Germany (GER); France (FRA); Spain (ESP); Mexico (MEX); United States (USA); Great Britain (GBR) |
| Host Quota across all 6 events | 0* | —N/a | | |
| Bipartite Committee Places across all 6 events | 10 | Great Britain (GBR); Japan (JPN); Australia (AUS) | Germany (GER); Italy (ITA); Spain (ESP) | France (FRA); Great Britain (GBR); Australia (AUS) |
| | | Women | | |
| | | PT2 | PT4 | PT5 |
| 2015 ITU World Championships 19 September 2015 (United States) Chicago | 1 per event | United States (USA) | Great Britain (GBR) | Australia (AUS) |
| 2016 ITU Paralympic Qualification List | 6 per event | United States (USA); France (FRA); Finland (FIN); Russia (RUS); Spain (ESP); Japan (JPN) | United States (USA); Australia (AUS); Great Britain (GBR); France (FRA); Canada (CAN); Brazil (BRA) | United States (USA); United States (USA); Netherlands (NED); Spain (ESP); Great Britain (GBR); Great Britain (GBR) |
| Host Quota across all 6 events | 1 | | Brazil (BRA) | |
| Bipartite Committee Places across all 6 events | 7 | United States (USA) | United States (USA); Australia (AUS); Great Britain (GBR) | Japan (JPN); Canada (CAN); Ireland (IRL) |

== Medal summary ==
=== Medal table ===
| Rank | Nation | Gold | Silver | Bronze | Total |
|---|---|---|---|---|---|
| 1 | United States (USA) | 2 | 1 | 1 | 4 |
| 2 | Great Britain (GBR) | 1 | 2 | 1 | 4 |
| 3 | Netherlands (NED) | 1 | 1 | 0 | 2 |
| 4 | Australia (AUS) | 1 | 0 | 0 | 1 |
| 4 | Germany (GER) | 1 | 0 | 0 | 1 |
| 6 | Italy (ITA) | 0 | 1 | 1 | 2 |
| 7 | Canada (CAN) | 0 | 1 | 0 | 1 |
| 8 | France (FRA) | 0 | 0 | 1 | 1 |
| 8 | Morocco (MAR) | 0 | 0 | 1 | 1 |
| 8 | Spain (ESP) | 0 | 0 | 1 | 1 |
| Totals (10 entries) | | 6 | 6 | 6 | 18 |

=== Events ===
| Event | Class | Gold | Silver | Bronze |
|---|---|---|---|---|
| Men's individual | PT1 | Jetze Plat; Netherlands | Geert Schipper; Netherlands | Giovanni Achenza; Italy |
| Men's individual | PT2 | Andrew Lewis; Great Britain | Michele Ferrarin; Italy | Mohamed Lahna; Morocco |
| Men's individual | PT4 | Martin Schulz; Germany | Stefan Daniel; Canada | Jairo Ruiz Lopez; Spain |
| Women's individual | PT2 | Allysa Seely; United States | Hailey Danisewicz; United States | Melissa Stockwell; United States |
| Women's individual | PT4 | Grace Norman; United States | Lauren Steadman; Great Britain | Gwladys Lemoussu; France |
| Women's individual | PT5 | Katie Kelly; Australia | Alison Patrick; Great Britain | Melissa Reid; Great Britain |
