= Triathlon at the 2020 Summer Paralympics – Men's PTS5 =

Men's PTS5 at the XVI Paralympic Games
- Venue: Odaiba Marine Park
- Dates: 29 August 2021
- Competitors: 10 from 9 nations

Medalists
1st place, gold medalist(s)		Martin Schulz	Germany
2nd place, silver medalist(s)		George Peasgood	Great Britain
3rd place, bronze medalist(s)		Stefan Daniel	Canada

The Triathlon at the 2020 Summer Paralympics – Men's PTS5 event at the 2020 Paralympic Games took place at 08:30 on 29 August 2021 at the Odaiba Marine Park.

== Results ==
Key : T = Transition; L = Lap

Rank	Bib	Name	Nationality	Swim	T1	Bike				T2	Run				Time
Rank	Bib	Name	Nationality	Swim	T1	L1	L2	L3	L4	T2	L1	L2	L3	L4	Time
1st place, gold medalist(s)	522	Martin Schulz	Germany	10:28	0:52	7:08	7:10	7:13	7:21	0:47	3:49	4:17	4:21	4:44	58:10
2nd place, silver medalist(s)	524	George Peasgood	Great Britain	9:27	0:53	7:34	7:14	7:12	7:14	0:38	4:01	4:47	4:46	5:09	58:55
3rd place, bronze medalist(s)	525	Stefan Daniel	Canada	10:31	0:59	7:37	7:30	7:33	7:33	0:49	3:45	4:17	4:25	4:23	59:22
4	523	Chris Hammer	United States	11:31	0:59	7:32	7:28	7:26	7:42	0:46	3:39	4:08	4:08	4:09	59:28
5	528	Ronan Cordeiro	Brazil	10:32	0:47	7:56	7:50	7:52	7:51	0:51	3:55	4:25	4:28	4:55	1:01:22
6	529	Carlos Rafael Viana	Brazil	11:32	0:50	7:49	7:44	7:46	7:46	0:41	3:52	4:39	4:48	4:59	1:02:26
7	521	David Bryant	Australia	12:07	1:03	7:25	7:29	7:26	7:37	0:48	4:07	4:49	4:46	4:53	1:02:30
8	526	Jairo Ruiz Lopez	Spain	11:45	0:58	7:54	7:51	7:53	7:58	0:42	3:47	4:31	4:31	4:58	1:02:48
9	530	Günther Matzinger	Austria	12:21	1:08	7:38	7:42	7:45	8:00	0:48	3:55	4:28	4:32	4:36	1:02:53
10	527	Yannick Bourseaux	France	12:25	0:56	7:47	7:42	7:46	8:02	0:46	4:02	4:35	4:38	4:55	1:03:34
