= Triathlon at the 2024 Summer Paralympics – Women's PTS2 =

Women's PTS2 at the XVII Paralympic Games
- Venue: Pont Alexandre III
- Dates: 1 September 2024
- Competitors: 10 from 8 nations

Medalists
1st place, gold medalist(s)		Hailey Danz	United States
2nd place, silver medalist(s)		Veronica Yoko Plebani	Italy
3rd place, bronze medalist(s)		Allysa Seely	United States

The Triathlon at the 2024 Summer Paralympics – Women's PTS2 event at the 2024 Paralympic Games will take place at 07:15 CET on 1 September 2024 at Pont Alexandre III, Paris. 10 athletes represented 9 nations competed.

== Venue ==
The triathlon course started from Pont Alexandre III bridge near Seine River and ended at the same place. The event was over sprint distance. There was a 750 metre Swim through Seine River, 20 km para cycling at Champs-Élysées, Avenue Montaigne, and a crossing of the Seine by the Pont des Invalides until reaching the Quai d'Orsay. The last leg of 5 km run ended at Pont Alexandre III bridge.

== Results ==
World Triathlon confirmed the final entry list for the event in August 2024.

Rank	Bib	Athlete	Nationality	Swim	T1	Bike	T2	Run	Total Time	Notes
1st place, gold medalist(s)	202	Hailey Danz	United States	13:11	1:26	36:06	0:59	22:49	1:14:31	
2nd place, silver medalist(s)	207	Veronica Yoko Plebani	Italy	13:12	1:43	37:37	0:59	21:56	1:15:37	
3rd place, bronze medalist(s)	204	Allysa Seely	United States	13:12	-	39:34	0:46	21:47	1:16:33	
4	203	Anu Francis	Australia	14:38	2:03	36:27	1:00	23:40	1:17:48	
5	205	Melissa Stockwell	United States	13:04	1:44	40:08	1:06	25:04	1:21:06	
6	209	Cécile Saboureau	France	13:57	1:59	38:52	1:14	25:41	1:21:43	
7	211	Emma Rodriguez	Venezuela	16:29	2:37	40:48	1:47	24:27	1:26:08	
8	208	Neele Ludwig	Germany	15:30	2:18	42:49	1:18	27:33	1:29:28	
9	206	Yukako Hata	Japan	15:35	2:23	44:07	2:12	29:46	1:34:03	
10	210	Rakel Uriarte	Spain	15:25	2:52	44:48	2:18	34:53	1:40:16	

Key : T = Transition; L = Lap
