= Triathlon at the 2024 Summer Paralympics – Men's PTS5 =

Men's PTS5 at the XVII Paralympic Games
- Venue: Pont Alexandre III
- Dates: 1 September 2024
- Competitors: 10 from 9 nations

Medalists
1st place, gold medalist(s)		Chris Hammer	United States
2nd place, silver medalist(s)		Disqualified	
3rd place, bronze medalist(s)		Martin Schulz	Germany

The Triathlon at the 2024 Summer Paralympics – Men's PTS5 event at the 2024 Paralympic Games took place at 07:15 CET on 1 September 2024 at Pont Alexandre III, Paris. 10 athletes representing 8 nations competed.

== Venue ==
The triathlon course will start from Pont Alexandre III bridge near Seine River and will end at the same place. The event will be over sprint distance. There will be 750 metre Swim through Seine River, 20 km para cycling at Champs-Élysées, Avenue Montaigne, crossing the Seine by the Pont des Invalides and reaching the Quai d'Orsay and last leg of 5 km run will end at Pont Alexandre III bridge.

== Results ==
Rank	Bib	Athlete	Nationality	Swim	T1	Bike	T2	Run	Total Time	Notes
1st place, gold medalist(s)	526	Chris Hammer	United States	12:03	0:54	29:06	0:42	15:59	58:44	
3rd place, bronze medalist(s)	527	Martin Schulz	Germany	11:27	0:52	29:35	0:40	16:45	59:19	
4	533	Filipe Marques	Portugal	10:37	0:53	30:41	0:44	17:04	59:59	
5	530	Bence Mocsari	Hungary	10:56	0:47	30:22	0:32	17:26	1:00:03	
6	532	Ugurcan Ozer	Turkey	11:32	0:58	30:51	0:32	17:24	1:01:17	
7	529	Jack Howell	Australia	10:54	0:54	31:20	0:41	18:32	1:02:21	
8	531	David Bryant	Australia	12:45	0:58	30:27	0:32	18:05	1:02:47	
9	534	Jairo Ruiz Lopez	Spain	12:05	1:24	31:16	0:31	18:14	1:03:30	
10	525	Stefan Daniel	Canada	11:24	0:49	34:37	0:36	16:32	1:03:58	
	528	Ronan Cordeiro	Brazil	10:52	0:43	30:31	0:31	16:24	59:01	DQ

Key : T = Transition; L = Lap
