= Triathlon at the 2020 Summer Paralympics – Women's PTS2 =

Women's PTS2 at the XVI Paralympic Games
- Venue: Odaiba Marine Park
- Dates: 28 August 2021
- Competitors: 8 from 6 nations

Medalists
| 1st place, gold medalist(s) | | Allysa Seely | United States |
| 2nd place, silver medalist(s) | | Hailey Danz | United States |
| 3rd place, bronze medalist(s) | | Veronica Yoko Plebani | Italy |

The Triathlon at the 2020 Summer Paralympics – Women's PTS2 event at the 2020 Paralympic Games took place at 06:31 on 28 August 2021 at the Odaiba Marine Park.

== Results ==
Key : T = Transition; L = Lap

| Rank | Bib | Name | Nationality | Swim | T1 | Bike | | | | T2 | Run | | | | Time |
| Rank | Bib | Name | Nationality | Swim | T1 | L1 | L2 | L3 | L4 | T2 | L1 | L2 | L3 | L4 | Time |
|---|---|---|---|---|---|---|---|---|---|---|---|---|---|---|---|
| 1st place, gold medalist(s) | 206 | Allysa Seely | United States | 12:47 | 1:36 | 8:57 | 8:55 | 9:09 | 9:28 | 1:19 | 4:52 | 5:30 | 5:33 | 5:57 | 1:14:03 |
| 2nd place, silver medalist(s) | 205 | Hailey Danz | United States | 12:32 | 1:55 | 8:39 | 8:51 | 8:50 | 8:46 | 1:12 | 5:14 | 5:57 | 6:04 | 6:58 | 1:14:58 |
| 3rd place, bronze medalist(s) | 201 | Veronica Yoko Plebani | Italy | 12:29 | 1:46 | 9:02 | 9:02 | 9:07 | 9:26 | 1:07 | 5:04 | 5:54 | 6:11 | 6:47 | 1:15:55 |
| 4 | 210 | Fran Brown | Great Britain | 13:11 | 1:51 | 8:38 | 8:29 | 8:33 | 8:55 | 1:19 | 6:17 | 7:14 | 7:06 | 8:09 | 1:19:42 |
| 5 | 207 | Melissa Stockwell | United States | 12:07 | 2:44 | 10:17 | 9:25 | 9:24 | 9:38 | 1:14 | 5:39 | 6:39 | 6:36 | 7:42 | 1:21:25 |
| 6 | 204 | Yukako Hata | Japan | 11:55 | 2:16 | 10:11 | 10:17 | 10:20 | 10:42 | 1:53 | 6:45 | 7:35 | 7:47 | 8:23 | 1:28:04 |
| 7 | 209 | Rakel Mateo | Spain | 14:24 | 2:22 | 10:14 | 10:21 | 10:32 | 10:51 | 1:24 | 6:45 | 7:41 | 7:35 | 8:28 | 1:30:37 |
| 8 | 202 | Veronika Gabitova | RPC | 16:00 | 2:04 | 10:12 | 10:46 | 10:45 | 11:07 | 1:37 | 7:54 | 9:39 | 9:26 | 10:10 | 1:39:40 |
