= Triathlon at the 2016 Summer Paralympics – Women's PT2 =

Women's PT2 at the XV Paralympic Games
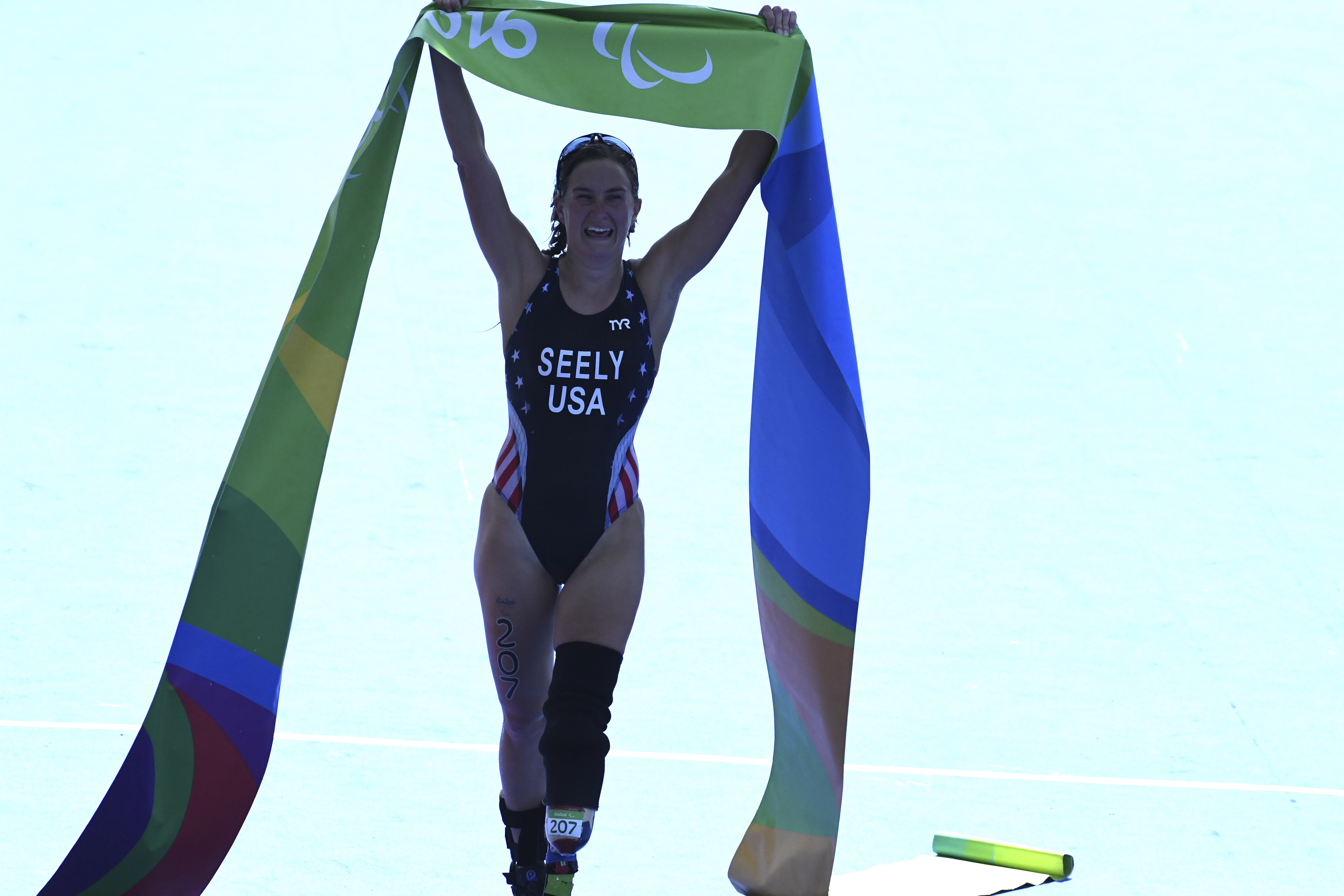
- Allysa Seely wins the race
- Venue: Fort Copacabana
- Dates: 11 September 2016
- Competitors: 8 from 6 nations

Medalists
1st place, gold medalist(s)		Allysa Seely	United States
2nd place, silver medalist(s)		Hailey Danisewicz	United States
3rd place, bronze medalist(s)		Melissa Stockwell	United States

The Triathlon at the 2016 Summer Paralympics – Women's PT2 event at the 2016 Paralympic Games took place at 10:03 on 11 September 2016 at Fort Copacabana.

== Results ==
Rank	Bib	Name	Nationality	Swim	1st Transition	Bike Lap 1	Bike Lap 2	Bike Lap 3	Bike Lap 4	2nd Transition	Run Lap 1	Run Lap 2	Time
1st place, gold medalist(s)	207	Allysa Seely	United States	12:41	2:01	10:31	10:29	10:48	11:00	1:12	11:04	13:09	1:22:55
2nd place, silver medalist(s)	206	Hailey Danisewicz	United States	13:27	2:10	9:41	9:53	10:08	10:31	1:16	12:22	14:15	1:23:43
3rd place, bronze medalist(s)	208	Melissa Stockwell	United States	12:05	2:17	10:50	10:48	10:48	10:41	1:16	12:33	14:06	1:25:24
4	204	Liisa Lilja	Finland	13:00	2:23	10:31	11:01	10:57	11:14	1:21	12:01	13:33	1:26:01
5	205	Élise Marc	France	13:32	2:31	10:32	11:01	11:16	11:54	1:26	12:14	14:01	1:28:27
6	202	Yukako Hata	Japan	12:33	2:42	11:02	11:33	11:45	11:43	1:43	14:01	16:19	1:33:21
7	203	Shahrzad Kiavash	Sweden	15:25	3:20	10:44	11:09	11:09	11:39	2:21	13:24	14:34	1:33:45
8	201	Rakel Mateo	Spain	13:28	2:43	11:51	12:14	12:06	12:29	1:18	16:09	18:15	1:40:33

Source: "Women's - PT2 Schedule and Results". Rio 2016 Paralympic Games. Archived from the original on 3 October 2016.
