= Triathlon at the 2016 Summer Paralympics – Men's PT4 =

Men's PT4 at the XV Paralympic Games
- Venue: Fort Copacabana
- Dates: 10 September 2016
- Competitors: 11 from 9 nations

Medalists
1st place, gold medalist(s)		Martin Schulz	Germany
2nd place, silver medalist(s)		Stefan Daniel	Canada
3rd place, bronze medalist(s)		Jairo Ruiz Lopez	Spain

The Triathlon at the 2016 Summer Paralympics – Men's PT4 event at the 2016 Paralympic Games took place at 10:00 on 10 September 2016 at Fort Copacabana.

== Results ==
Rank	Bib	Name	Nationality	Swim	1st Transition	Bike Lap 1	Bike Lap 2	Bike Lap 3	Bike Lap 4	2nd Transition	Run Lap 1	Run Lap 2	Time
1st place, gold medalist(s)	411	Martin Schulz	Germany	10:33	1:09	7:56	8:08	8:07	8:12	0:39	8:26	9:27	1:02:37
2nd place, silver medalist(s)	410	Stefan Daniel	Canada	10:51	1:10	8:11	8:25	8:32	8:52	0:49	7:43	8:32	1:03:05
3rd place, bronze medalist(s)	404	Jairo Ruiz Lopez	Spain	11:06	1:14	8:10	8:27	8:13	8:21	0:41	8:06	8:56	1:03:14
4	407	Christopher Hammer	United States	12:24	1:21	8:00	8:08	8:09	8:17	0:48	7:55	8:41	1:03:43
5	408	Yannick Bourseaux	France	12:59	1:09	7:51	8:13	8:11	8:20	0:43	8:15	9:13	1:04:54
6	401	Jose Abraham Estrada Sierra	Mexico	10:14	1:08	8:27	8:44	8:39	8:51	0:43	8:43	9:51	1:05:20
7	403	George Peasgood	Great Britain	9:41	1:07	8:28	8:17	8:22	8:26	0:37	9:58	11:12	1:06:08
8	409	Maxime Maurel	France	10:18	1:07	8:26	8:38	8:44	8:52	0:51	9:14	10:38	1:06:48
9	406	Peter Boronkay	Hungary	12:14	1:19	9:45	8:48	8:39	8:43	0:49	8:45	9:36	1:08:38
10	402	David Hill	Great Britain	11:04	1:22	8:41	8:53	8:53	8:57	0:45	9:18	10:45	1:08:38
11	405	Keiichi Sato	Japan	14:04	1:10	8:26	8:35	8:33	8:38	0:44	9:07	9:56	1:09:13

Source: "Men's - PT4 Schedute and Results". Rio 2016 Paralympic Games.
