= Triathlon at the 2016 Summer Paralympics – Men's PT2 =

Men's PT2 at the XV Paralympic Games
- Venue: Fort Copacabana
- Dates: 10 September 2016
- Competitors: 10 from 8 nations

Medalists
1st place, gold medalist(s)		Andy Lewis	Great Britain
2nd place, silver medalist(s)		Michele Ferrarin	Italy
3rd place, bronze medalist(s)		Mohamed Lahna	Morocco

The Triathlon at the 2016 Summer Paralympics – Men's PT2 event at the 2016 Paralympic Games took place at 10:03 on 10 September 2016 at Fort Copacabana.

== Results ==
Rank	Bib	Name	Nationality	Swim	1st Transition	Bike Lap 1	Bike Lap 2	Bike Lap 3	Bike Lap 4	2nd Transition	Run Lap 1	Run Lap 2	Time
1st place, gold medalist(s)	206	Andy Lewis	Great Britain	10:57	1:54	9:09	9:15	9:13	9:21	1:13	9:39	11:08	1:11:49
2nd place, silver medalist(s)	202	Michele Ferrarin	Italy	11:32	1:29	8:36	8:52	8:50	8:57	1:01	11:06	12:07	1:12:30
3rd place, bronze medalist(s)	205	Mohamed Lahna	Morocco	11:34	1:32	9:00	9:06	9:13	9:36	0:58	10:12	11:24	1:12:35
4	204	Mark Barr	United States	10:04	2:18	9:13	9:30	9:58	9:05	1:51	9:51	11:01	1:12:51
5	201	Stéphane Bahier	France	11:37	1:58	8:32	8:43	9:00	8:59	1:25	10:51	12:25	1:13:30
6	207	Ryan Taylor	Great Britain	14:26	1:39	8:44	9:04	9:12	9:28	1:07	9:35	11:05	1:14:20
7	208	Lionel Morales Gonzalez	Spain	12:08	2:16	9:13	9:39	9:42	9:47	1:04	10:56	11:58	1:16:43
8	210	Stefan Loesler	Germany	12:07	2:24	9:53	9:57	10:08	10:18	1:22	10:08	11:07	1:17:24
9	203	Giovanni Sasso	Italy	12:24	1:53	9:06	9:08	8:56	9:32	1:31	12:34	14:13	1:19:17
10	209	Brant Garvey	Australia	10:45	1:36	9:51	10:21	10:11	10:17	1:56	11:49	12:35	1:19:21

Source: "Men's - PT2 Schedute and Results". Rio 2016 Paralympic Games. Archived from the original on 23 September 2016.
