= Allysa Seely =

American paratriathlete and Paralympic gold medalist

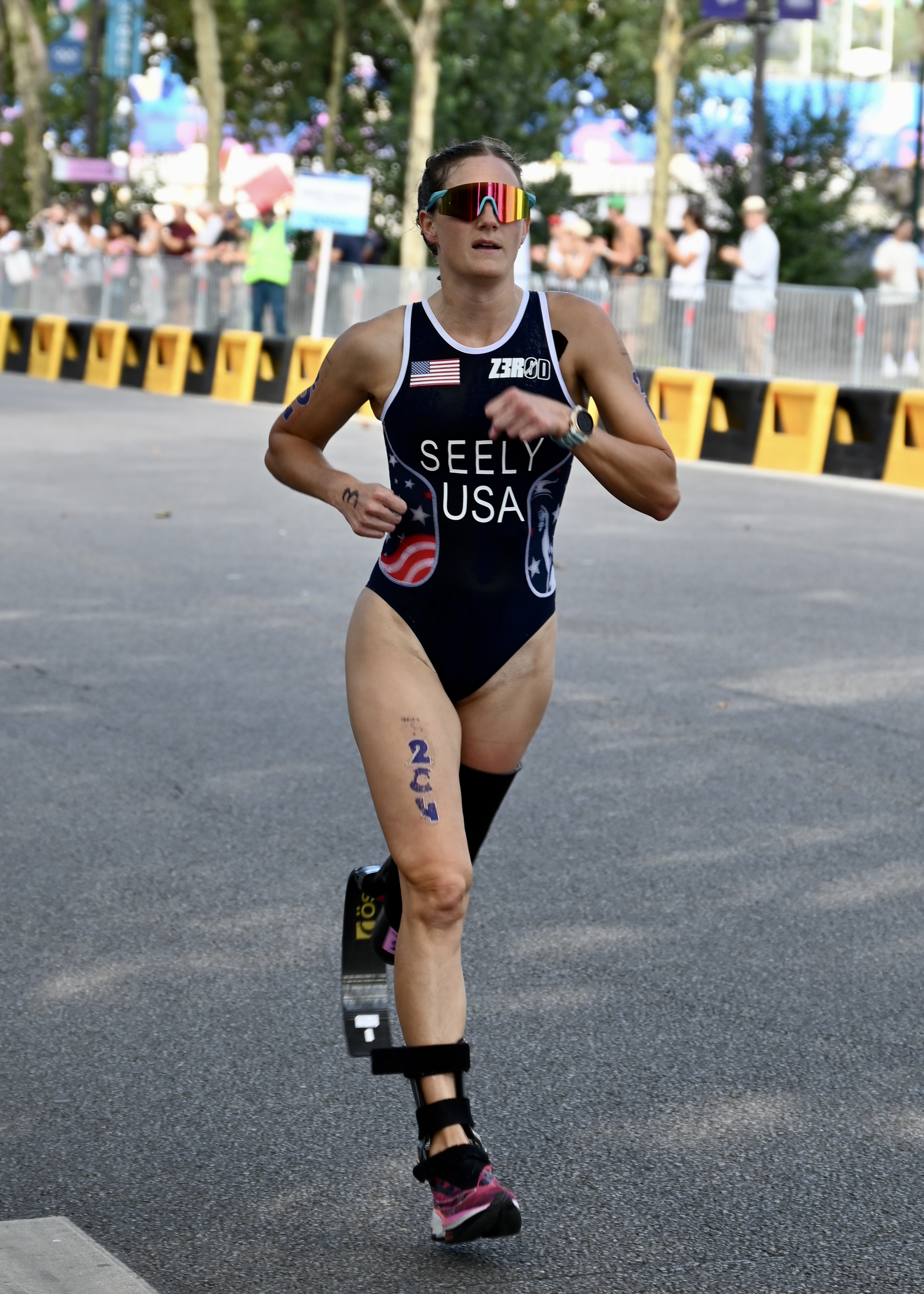
- Seely at the 2024 Summer Paralympics

Personal information
- Nationality: (United States) American
- Born: Allysa Ann Seely; January 4, 1989 (age 37)
- Home town: Glendale, Arizona
- Education: Arizona State University

Sport
- Sport: Paratriathlon
- Disability class: PTS2
Medal record
Representing United States
Paralympic Games
Gold medal – first place	2016 Rio de Janeiro	PT2
Gold medal – first place	2020 Tokyo	PTS2
Bronze medal – third place	2024 Paris	PTS2
World Championships
Gold medal – first place	2015 Rotterdam	PT2
Gold medal – first place	2016 Chicago	PT2
Gold medal – first place	2018 Gold Coast	PTS2
Gold medal – first place	2024 Torremolinos	PTS2
Silver medal – second place	2017 Rotterdam	PTS2
Silver medal – second place	2019 Lausanne	PTS2
Bronze medal – third place	2012 Auckland	TRI-5
Bronze medal – third place	2023 Pontevedra	PTS2
Americas Championships
Gold medal – first place	2016 Sarasota	PT2
Gold medal – first place	2017 Sarasota	PTS2
Silver medal – second place	2021 Pleasant Prairie	PTS2
Bronze medal – third place	2015 Monterrey	PT2
Bronze medal – third place	2024 Miami	PTS2

Allysa Seely (born January 4, 1989) is an American paratriathlete and gold medalist at the 2016 and 2020 Summer Paralympics.

== Background ==
Seely was born on January 4, 1989. She grew up in Glendale, Arizona, and graduated from Mountain Ridge High School in 2007. She attended Arizona State University afterwards.

In September 2008 Seely raced her first triathlon as part of a group that raises money for cancer research and then joined the Arizona State University triathlon team. In 2010 Seely was diagnosed with Chiari II malformation, basilar invagination, and Ehlers–Danlos syndrome. In August 2013, her left leg was amputated below the knee.

In 2020 Seely was diagnosed with endocarditis as well as a blood clot in her heart.

== Sports career ==
Seely was nationally ranked in the triathlon prior to her diagnoses and amputation. She is a three-time world champion at the paratriathlon, having won in 2015, 2016 and 2018.

=== 2016 Summer Paralympics ===
Seely competed in the 2016 Summer Paralympics. She won the gold medal in the Paratriathlon. She also competed in Athletics, the Women's 200 meters where she placed 6th.

=== 2020 Summer Paralympics ===
Seely competed at the 2020 Summer Paralympics where she defended her title and won her second gold medal in the paratriathlon.

=== 2024 Summer Paralympics ===
Seely competed at the 2024 Summer Paralympics where she won the bronze medal in the paratriathlon behind Hailey Danz and Veronica Yoko Plebani.

== Personal life ==
Seely currently resides in Colorado Springs, Colorado, with her golden retriever and trains at the Olympic Training Center.

== Competitive history ==
Year	Event	Finish	Time	Class
2012	Edmonton Triathlon World Cup	2nd place, silver medalist(s)	1:25:07	TRI-5
2012	World Grand Final Auckland	3rd place, bronze medalist(s)	1:17:43	TRI-5
2014	Yokohama World Paratriathlon Event	2nd place, silver medalist(s)	1:30:12	PT3
2014	Triathlon Pan American Championships Dallas	1st place, gold medalist(s)	1:41:07	PT3
2014	Chicago World Paratriathlon Event	1st place, gold medalist(s)	1:30:38	PT3
2014	Magog World Paratriathlon Event	1st place, gold medalist(s)	1:29:41	PT3
2014	World Grand Final Edmonton	4	1:36:29	PT3
2014	USA Paratriathlon National Championships	1st place, gold medalist(s)	1:50:31	PT3
2015	Triathlon American Championships Monterrey	3rd place, bronze medalist(s)	1:28:48	PT2
2015	London World Paratriathlon Event	3rd place, bronze medalist(s)	1:35:34	PT2
2015	Besançon World Paratriathlon Event	2nd place, silver medalist(s)	1:34:27	PT2
2015	Rio de Janeiro World Paratriathlon Event	3rd place, bronze medalist(s)	1:28:25	PT2
2015	Detroit World Paratriathlon Event	2nd place, silver medalist(s)	1:20:37	PT2
2015	Edmonton World Paratriathlon Event	1st place, gold medalist(s)	1:30:33	PT2
2015	World Grand Final Chicago	1st place, gold medalist(s)	1:25:03	PT2
2016	Paratriathlon American Championships Sarasota	1st place, gold medalist(s)	1:17:29	PT2
2016	World Championships Rotterdam	1st place, gold medalist(s)	1:23:46	PT2
2016	Paralympic Paratriathlon PT2	1st place, gold medalist(s)	1:22:55	PT2
2016	Paralympic 200 Meters T36	6	32.36	T36
2017	Paratriathlon American Championships Sarasota	1st place, gold medalist(s)	1:17:47	PTS2
2017	Gold Coast World Paratriathlon Series	1st place, gold medalist(s)	1:26:35	PTS2
2017	Yokohama World Paratriathlon Series	1st place, gold medalist(s)	1:21:01	PTS2
2017	World Grand Final Rotterdam	2nd place, silver medalist(s)	1:24:50	PTS2
2018	World Paratriathlon Series Yokohama	1st place, gold medalist(s)	1:17:39	PTS2
2018	Iseo - Franciacorta World Paratriathlon Series	1st place, gold medalist(s)	1:19:22	PTS2
2018	Edmonton World Paratriathlon Series	1st place, gold medalist(s)	1:21:54	PTS2
2018	World Grand Final Gold Coast	1st place, gold medalist(s)	1:17:54	PTS2
2019	World Paratriathlon Series Milan	1st place, gold medalist(s)	1:17:44	PTS2
2019	World Paratriathlon Series Yokohama	1st place, gold medalist(s)	1:19:38	PTS2
2019	World Paratriathlon Series Montreal	1st place, gold medalist(s)	1:20:12	PTS2
2019	Tokyo World Cup	DNF		PTS2
2019	World Grand Final Lausanne	2nd place, silver medalist(s)	1:25:18	PTS2
2021	Americas Triathlon Para Championships	2nd place, silver medalist(s)	1:17:03	PTS2
2021	Paralympic Paratriathlon PTS2	1st place, gold medalist(s)	1:14:03	PTS2
2023	Americas Triathlon Para Cup St. Peters	1st place, gold medalist(s)	1:18:14	PTS2
2023	World Triathlon Cross Championships Ibiza	1st place, gold medalist(s)	1:52:26	PTS2
2023	World Triathlon Para Series Yokohama	3rd place, bronze medalist(s)	1:15:36	PTS2
2023	World Triathlon Para Series Swansea	1st place, gold medalist(s)	38:50	PTS2
2023	World Triathlon Para Championships Pontevedra	3rd place, bronze medalist(s)	1:15:48	PTS2
2024	Americas Triathlon Para Cup Miami	3rd place, bronze medalist(s)	1:16:07	PTS2
2024	World Triathlon Para Series Devonport	2nd place, silver medalist(s)	1:22:16	PTS2
2024	World Triathlon Para Cup Besancon	1st place, gold medalist(s)	1:24:13	PTS2
2024	World Triathlon Para Series Swansea	1st place, gold medalist(s)	1:20:12	PTS2
2024	World Triathlon Para Series Montreal	1st place, gold medalist(s)	1:14:20	PTS2
2024	Paralympic Paratriathlon PTS2	3rd place, bronze medalist(s)	1:13:32	PTS2
2024	World Triathlon Para Championships Torremolinos	1st place, gold medalist(s)	1:19:23	PTS2
2025	World Triathlon Para Cup Magog	1st place, gold medalist(s)	1:26:01	PTS2
2025	World Triathlon Para Series Montreal	2nd place, silver medalist(s)	1:19:36	PTS2
2025	World Triathlon Para Championships Wollongong	4	1:25:34	PTS2
2026	World Triathlon Para Cup Chiba	2nd place, silver medalist(s)	1:23:40	PTS2

== See also ==
- United States at the 2016 Summer Paralympics
- United States at the 2020 Summer Paralympics
- Paratriathlon at the 2016 Summer Paralympics
- Paratriathlon at the 2020 Summer Paralympics
