= Triathlon at the 2016 Summer Paralympics – Women's PT5 =

Women's PT5 at the XV Paralympic Games
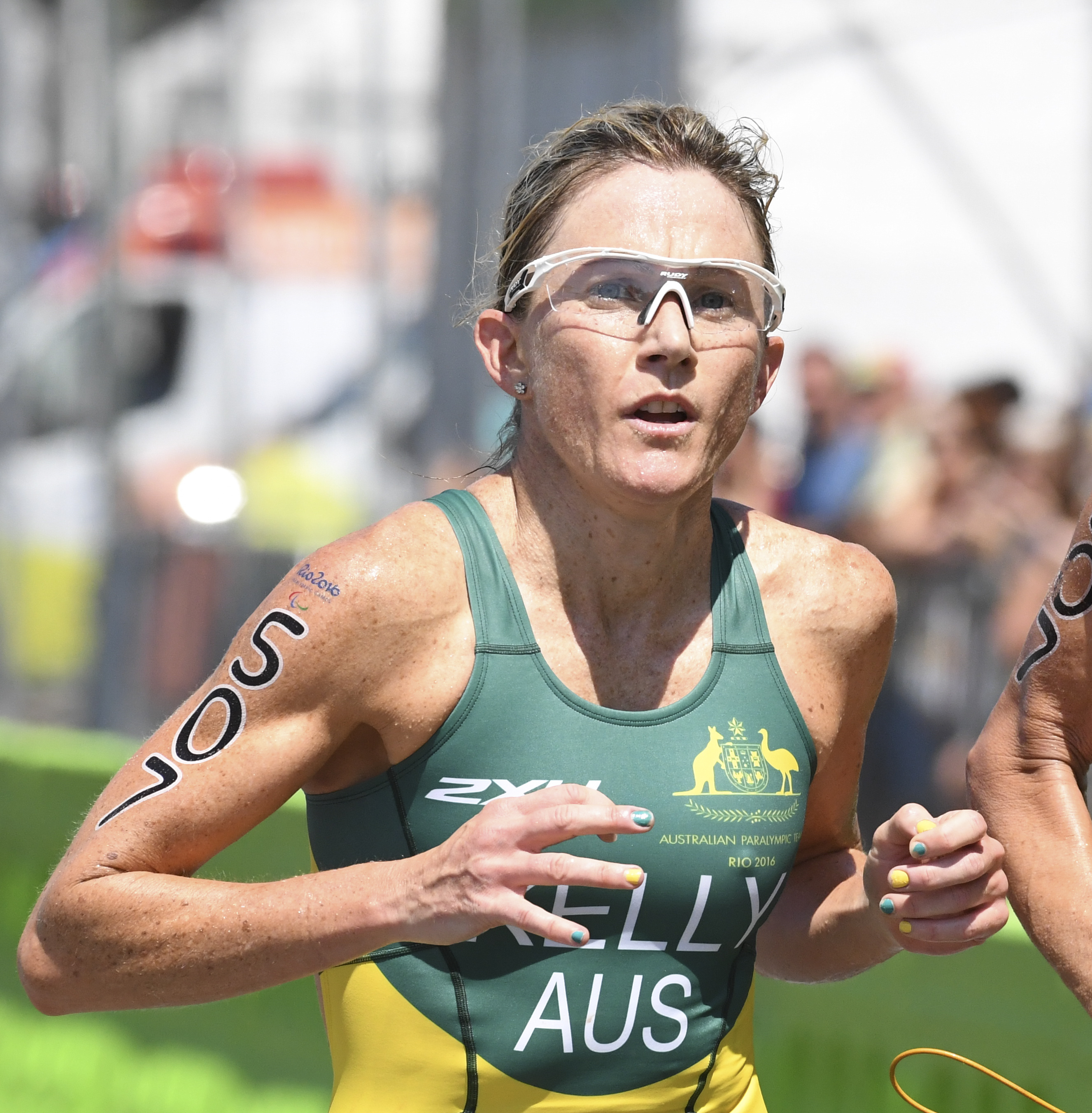
- Katie Kelly running in the event
- Venue: Fort Copacabana
- Dates: 11 September 2016
- Competitors: 10 from 8 nations

Medalists
1st place, gold medalist(s)		Katie Kelly; Michellie Jones	Australia
2nd place, silver medalist(s)		Alison Patrick; Hazel Smith	Great Britain
3rd place, bronze medalist(s)		Melissa Reid; Nicole Walters	Great Britain

The Triathlon at the 2016 Summer Paralympics – Women's PT5 event at the 2016 Paralympic Games took place at 11:35 on 11 September 2016 at Fort Copacabana.

== Results ==
Rank	Bib	Name	Nationality	Class	Swim	1st Transition	Bike Lap 1	Bike Lap 2	Bike Lap 3	Bike Lap 4	2nd Transition	Run Lap 1	Run Lap 2	Time
1st place, gold medalist(s)	507	Katie Kelly; Michellie Jones	Australia	TRPT5W-B3	12:21	1:24	8:10	8:17	8:18	8:30	0:53	9:51	10:46	1:12:18
2nd place, silver medalist(s)	503	Alison Patrick; Hazel Smith	Great Britain	TRPT5W-B3	12:01	1:29	8:17	8:24	8:31	8:49	0:54	9:52	11:15	1:13:20
3rd place, bronze medalist(s)	504	Melissa Reid; Nicole Walters	Great Britain	TRPT5W-B3	12:05	1:31	8:06	8:24	8:26	8:38	0:51	10:32	11:46	1:14:07
4	508	Elizabeth Baker; Jillian Petersen	United States	TRPT5W-B3	12:40	1:33	8:14	8:26	8:27	8:34	0:56	10:12	11:44	1:14:34
5	501	Susana Rodriguez Gacio; Maria Isabel Gallardo García	Spain	TRPT5W-B2	12:32	1:21	8:32	8:39	8:50	8:58	0:53	10:17	11:39	1:15:29
6	505	Joleen Hakker; Linda Van Vliet	Netherlands	TRPT5W-B1	15:16	1:52	8:25	8:41	8:56	8:56	1:02	10:59	12:11	1:16:18
7	509	Patricia Walsh; Jessica Jones Meyers	United States	TRPT5W-B1	16:29	1:57	8:43	8:49	8:55	9:08	1:13	10:59	11:42	1:17:55
8	510	Catherine Walsh; Francine Meehan	Ireland	TRPT5W-B3	17:23	1:35	8:20	8:30	8:38	8:44	1:03	11:35	12:49	1:22:25
9	506	Atsuko Yamada; Yuu Nishyama	Japan	TRPT5W-B2	13:48	1:44	9:08	9:17	9:11	9:13	0:58	12:01	13:38	1:22:46
10	502	Christine Robbins; Sacha Boulton	Canada	TRPT5W-B3	16:34	1:39	8:56	9:03	9:09	9:11	0:57	11:13	12:29	1:22:59

Source: "Women's - PT5 Schedute and Results". Rio 2016 Paralympic Games. Archived from the original on 22 September 2016.
