= Triathlon at the 2024 Summer Paralympics – Men's PTS2 =

Men's PTS2 at the XVII Paralympic Games
- Venue: Pont Alexandre III
- Dates: 1 September 2024
- Competitors: 10 from 6 nations

Medalists
1st place, gold medalist(s)		Jules Ribstein	France
2nd place, silver medalist(s)		Mohamed Lahna	United States
3rd place, bronze medalist(s)		Mark Barr	United States

The Triathlon at the 2024 Summer Paralympics – Men's PTS2 event at the 2024 Summer Paralympics took place at 07:15 CET on 1 September 2024 at Pont Alexandre III, Paris. 10 athletes representing 8 nations competed.

== Venue ==
The triathlon course will start from Pont Alexandre III bridge near Seine River and will end at the same place. The event will be over sprint distance. There will be 750 metre Swim through Seine River, 20 km para cycling at Champs-Élysées, Avenue Montaigne, crossing the Seine by the Pont des Invalides and reaching the Quai d'Orsay and last leg of 5 km run will end at Pont Alexandre III bridge.

== Results ==
Rank	Bib	Athlete	Nationality	Swim	T1	Bike	T2	Run	Total Time	Notes
1st place, gold medalist(s)	225	Jules Ribstein	France	11:01	1:14	32:40	1:02	19:50	1:05:47	
2nd place, silver medalist(s)	222	Mohamed Lahna	United States	12:09	1:15	33:00	0:52	20:02	1:07:18	
3rd place, bronze medalist(s)	224	Mark Barr	United States	10:46	1:43	34:18	0:58	19:48	1:07:33	
4	223	Maurits Morsink	Netherlands	16:40	1:31	32:08	0:40	17:28	1:08:27	
5	227	Wim De Paepe	Belgium	11:06	1:17	33:34	1:16	22:03	1:09:16	
6	226	Lionel Morales	Spain	11:47	2:12	34:09	1:14	20:59	1:10:21	
7	228	Geoffrey Wersy	France	16:16	1:17	35:45	2:18	21:23	1:16:59	
8	230	Gianluca Valori	Italy	17:37	2:25	36:01	0:26	23:10	1:19:39	
9	229	Tom Goodman	Australia	19:05	2:04	36:49	1:17	21:57	1:21:12	
	231	Juan Esteban Patiño	Colombia						DSQ	

Key : T = Transition; L = Lap
