= Ryan Taylor (paratriathlete) =

British paralympic triathlete (born 1993)

Personal information
- Born: 23 May 1993 (age 33) Derby, England

Sport
- Country: United Kingdom
- Sport: Paratriathlon
Medal record
Paratriathlon
Representing United Kingdom
World Championships
Silver medal – second place	2018 Gold Coast	PTS3
Bronze medal – third place	2025 Wollongong	PTS3
European Championships
Silver medal – second place	2018 Tartu	PTS3

Ryan Taylor (born 23 May 1993) is a British paralympic triathlete who competes in the PTS3 category. He is a medalist at the World Championships. He also competed at the 2016 Summer Paralympics.

== Early life ==
Born in Derby, Taylor has cerebral palsy that affects the right side of his body, prompting him to use an adoptive bike with brake and gear controls mainly on the left side.

== Career ==
On 15 July 2016, the British Paralympic Association announced the selection of eleven athletes, including Taylor, to compete in the inaugural Olympic paratriathlon competition in Rio. In September 2016, representing his country at the 2016 Summer Paralympics, he finished in sixth place in the PT2 event.

In the 2018 European Championships held in July, Taylor won the silver medal in his category. By September, in 2018 World Championships, he won the silver medal.

In 2025, Taylor ended his hiatus from triathlon and won the World Triathlon Para Cup event in Abu Dhabi and finished in second place in Alhandra. In October 2025, Taylor competed in the World Triathlon Para Championships, where he won the silver medal in the PTS3 event.
