= Jules Ribstein =

French paralympic triathlete

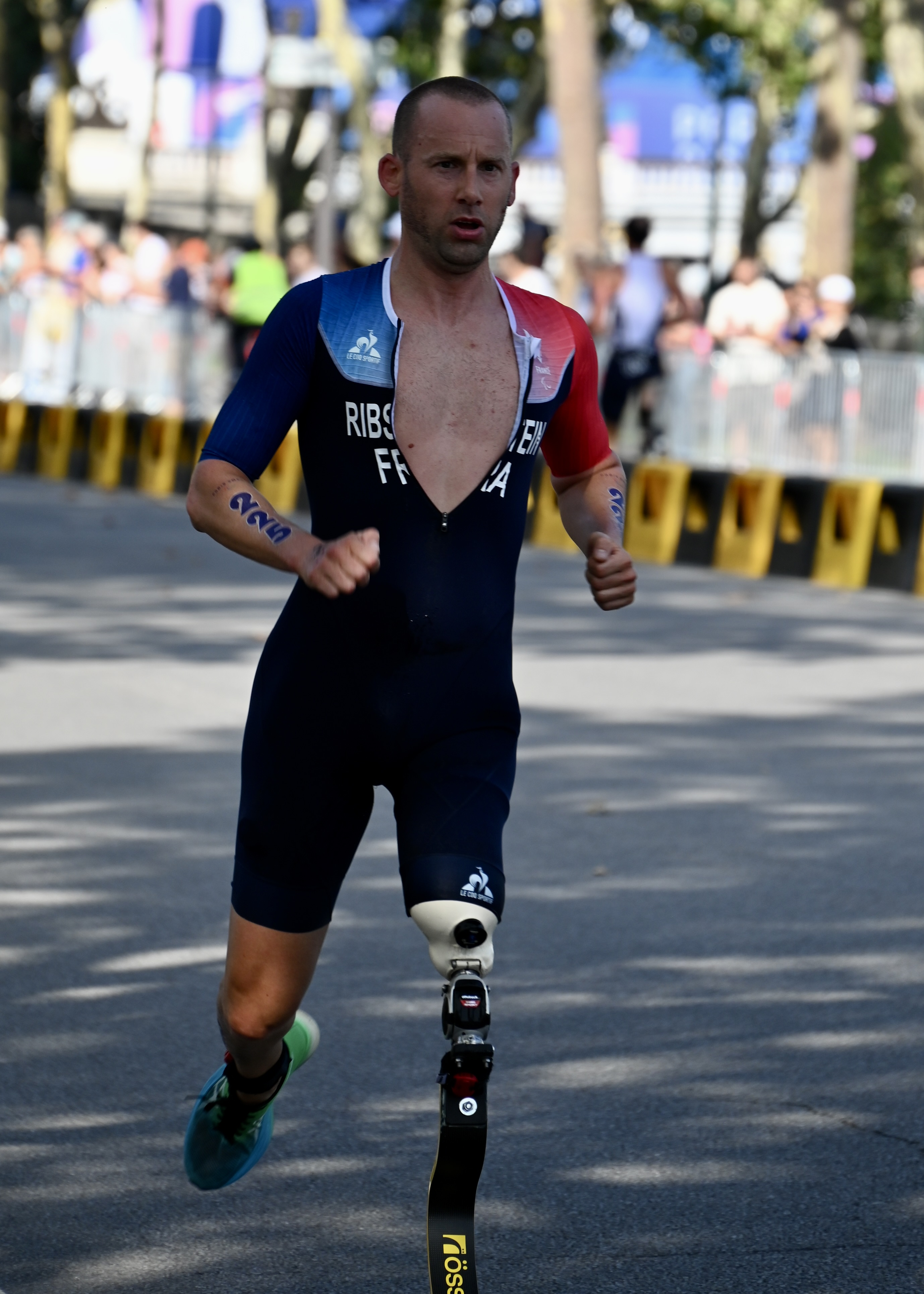
- Ribstein at the 2024 Summer Paralympics

Personal information
- Children: 2

Sport
- Country: France
- Sport: Paratriathlon
Medal record
Men's paratriathlon
Representing France
Paralympic Games
Gold medal – first place	2024 Paris	PTS2
World Championships
Gold medal – first place	2019 Lausanne	PTS2
Gold medal – first place	2021 Abu Dhabi	PTS2
Gold medal – first place	2022 Abu Dhabi	PTS2
Gold medal – first place	2023 Ponteverde	PTS2
Gold medal – first place	2025 Wollongong	PTS2
Gold medal – first place	2026 Pontevedra	PTS2
Bronze medal – third place	2018 Gold Coast	PTS2
European Championships
Gold medal – first place	2019 Valencia	PTS2
Gold medal – first place	2021 Valencia	PTS2
Gold medal – first place	2024 Vichy	PTS2
Silver medal – second place	2022 Olsztyn	PTS2
Silver medal – second place	2023 Madrid	PTS2
Silver medal – second place	2025 Besançon	PTS2

Jules Ribstein is a French paralympic triathlete. He competed at the 2024 Summer Paralympics, winning the gold medal in the men's PTS2 event.
