= Veronica Yoko Plebani =

Italian Paralympic para-snowboarder, para-canoeist and para-triathlete

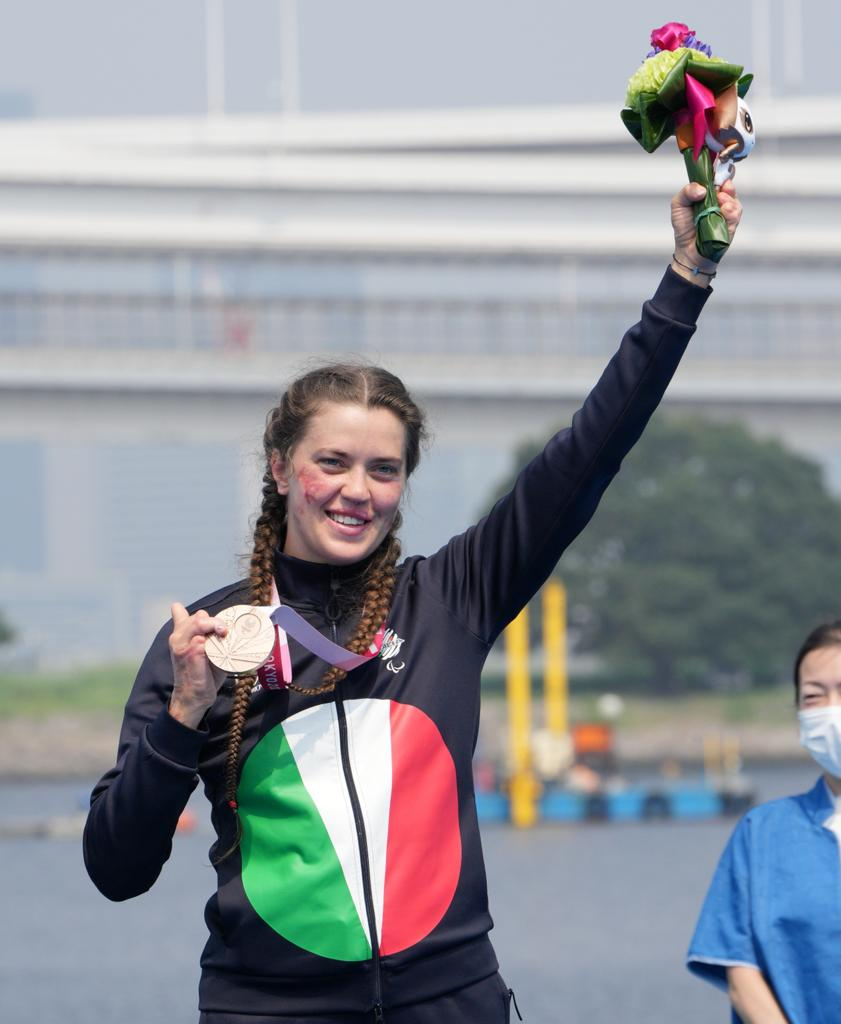

Personal information
- National team: Italy
- Born: 1 March 1996 (age 30) Gavardo, Italy

Sport
- Sport: Parasnowboarding; paracanoeing; paratriathlon
Medal record
Women's paratriathlon
Representing Italy
Paralympic Games
Silver medal – second place	2024 Paris	PTS2
Bronze medal – third place	2020 Tokyo	PTS2
European Championships
Gold medal – first place	2022 Olsztyn	PTS2
Bronze medal – third place	2018 Tartu	PTS2
Bronze medal – third place	2019 Valencia	PTS2

Veronica Yoko Plebani (born 1 March 1996) is an Italian Paralympic athlete who has competed in snowboarding, paracanoeing and paratriathlon. She competed at the 2020 Summer Paralympics, in Paratriathlon, Women's PTS2, winning a bronze medal.

== Biography ==
Plebani was born in Gavardo, in the province of Brescia, on 1 March 1996 and residing in Palazzolo sull'Oglio. Since childhood she has practiced numerous sports such as dance, gymnastics, athletics and snowboarding.

On 27 April 2011, Plebani contracted meningitis, which she survived with the loss of the phalanges of the hands and toes. In November 2011, just out of the hospital, she participated in the 5k the day before the New York City Marathon crossing the finish line with 28 runners of the Monza Marathon Team. In the meantime, she became part of the art4sport team, through which she began practicing canoeing and snowboarding. Plebani holds a Political Science degree from University of Bologna.

She competed at the 2014 Winter Paralympics, in snowboarding, and at the 2016 Summer Paralympics, in kayaking. In 2017, she started paratriathlon, and competed at the 2017 ITA Paratriathlon National Championships and the 2017 Besancon ITU Paratriathlon World Cup, winning gold medals.

== Achievements ==
Year	Competition	Venue	Rank	Event	Time	
Para snowboard
2014	Winter Paralympics	(Russia) Sochi	11th	Snowboard cross – Standing	3:42.34	
Para canoeing
2016	Summer Paralympics	(Brazil) Rio de Janeiro	6th	KL3	52.802	
Para triathlon
2021	Summer Paralympics	(Japan) Tokyo	3rd	PTS2	1:15.55	Para triathlon
2024	Summer Paralympics	(France) Paris	2nd	PTS2	1:15.37	Para triathlon
