= Chris Hammer (athlete) =

American para-athlete (born 1986)

Personal information
- Born: 30 March 1986 (age 40) Mount Clemens, Michigan, U.S.
- Height: 1.78 m (5 ft 10 in)

Sport
- Country: United States
- Sport: Paratriathlon
- Disability class: PTS5
Medal record
Men's para-athletics
Representing United States
Parapan American Games
Gold medal – first place	2011 Guadalajara	1500m T46
Men's paratriathlon
Paralympic Games
Gold medal – first place	2024 Paris	PTS5
World Championships
Gold medal – first place	2021 Abu Dhabi	PTS5
Gold medal – first place	2025 Wollongong	PTS5
Gold medal – first place	2026 Pontevedra	PTS5
Bronze medal – third place	2014 Edmonton	PTS5
Bronze medal – third place	2017 Rotterdam	PTS5
Bronze medal – third place	2019 Lausanne	PTS5
Bronze medal – third place	2022 Abu Dhabi	PTS5
Bronze medal – third place	2023 Ponteverde	PTS5
Americas Championships
Gold medal – first place	2016 Sarasota	PT4
Gold medal – first place	2017 Sarasota	PTS5
Gold medal – first place	2018 Sarasota-Bradenton	PTS5
Silver medal – second place	2014 Dallas	PT4
Silver medal – second place	2015 Monterrey	PT4
Silver medal – second place	2021 Pleasant Prairie	PTS5
Silver medal – second place	2022 Sarasota-Bradenton	PTS5
Silver medal – second place	2024 Miami	PTS5
Bronze medal – third place	2019 Sarasota-Bradenton	PTS5
Bronze medal – third place	2023 Sarasota	PTS5

Christopher Hammer (born 30 March 1986) is an American paratriathlete and former para-athletics middle-distance runner. He was born without his left hand. He competed at the Paralympic Games three times: in para-athletics he ran the men's T46 marathon, 800m and 1500m at the 2012 Summer Paralympics and changed to paratriathlon for the 2016 and 2020 Summer Paralympics.

== Career ==
In 2018 he started coaching triathlon at Davis & Elkins College in Elkins, West Virginia. Hammer has level 2 coaching certification and is a member of the USA Triathlon Nationals Coaching Committee. Hammer has a master's degree in sport psychology from Eastern Washington University and from the University of Utah he has an MBA and a PhD in sport psychology.
