= Mohamed Lahna =

Moroccan paratriathlete

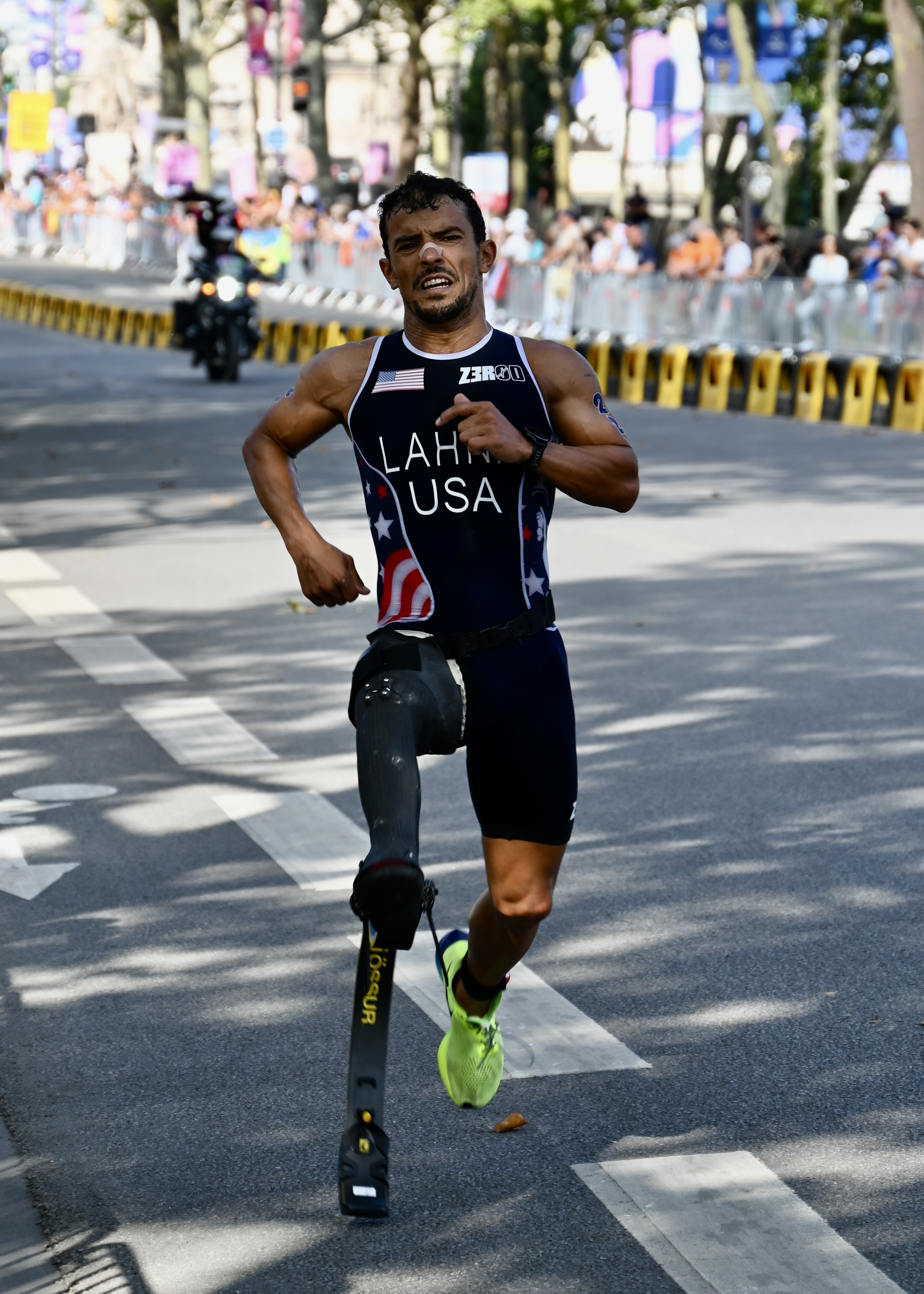
- Lahna at the 2024 Summer Paralympics

Personal information
- Full name: Mohamed Lahna
- National team: United States
- Born: March 11, 1982 (age 44) Casablanca, Morocco

Sport
- Sport: Paratriathlon
- Disability: Amputee
- Disability class: PT2
Medal record
Men's paratriathlon
Representing Morocco
Paralympic Games
Bronze medal – third place	2016 Rio	PT2
World Championships
Silver medal – second place	2011 Beijing	TRI 2
Representing United States
Paralympic Games
Silver medal – second place	2024 Paris	PTS2
World Championships
Silver medal – second place	2023 Ponteverde	PTS2
Silver medal – second place	2026 Pontevedra	PTS2
Bronze medal – third place	2025 Wollongong	PTS2
Americas Championships
Silver medal – second place	2017 Sarasota	PTS2
Silver medal – second place	2022 Sarasota-Bradenton	PTS2
Silver medal – second place	2023 Sarasota	PTS2
Bronze medal – third place	2018 Sarasota-Bradenton	PTS2

Mohamed Lahna (born March 11, 1982) is a Moroccan-American paratriathlete. Lahna won bronze in the men's PT2 paratriathlon at the 2016 Paralympics.

== Background ==
Mohamed Lahna was born without a right femur; due to this, he was not able to compete in his first triathlon until 2008. He started as a strong swimmer and was able to swim across the Strait of Gibraltar. He went on to represent Morocco until 2016.

As of 2017, Lahna has been competing under World Triathlon after requesting a change of representation from Morocco to the United States.

Mohamed has won four gold medals to date as well as 13 podium finishes and is currently ranked fourth in the world.

== Career ==
Lahna won bronze in the PT2 category at the 2016 Paralympics in Rio, the first Paralympics to include triathlon events. Lahna won in 1 hour 13 minutes and 35 seconds, with a margin of 46-second from the winner, the British Andy Lewis.

== Personal life ==
Mohamed Lahna was born on March 11, 1982, in Casablanca, Morocco
