= Cécile Saboureau =

French paratriathlete (born 1983)

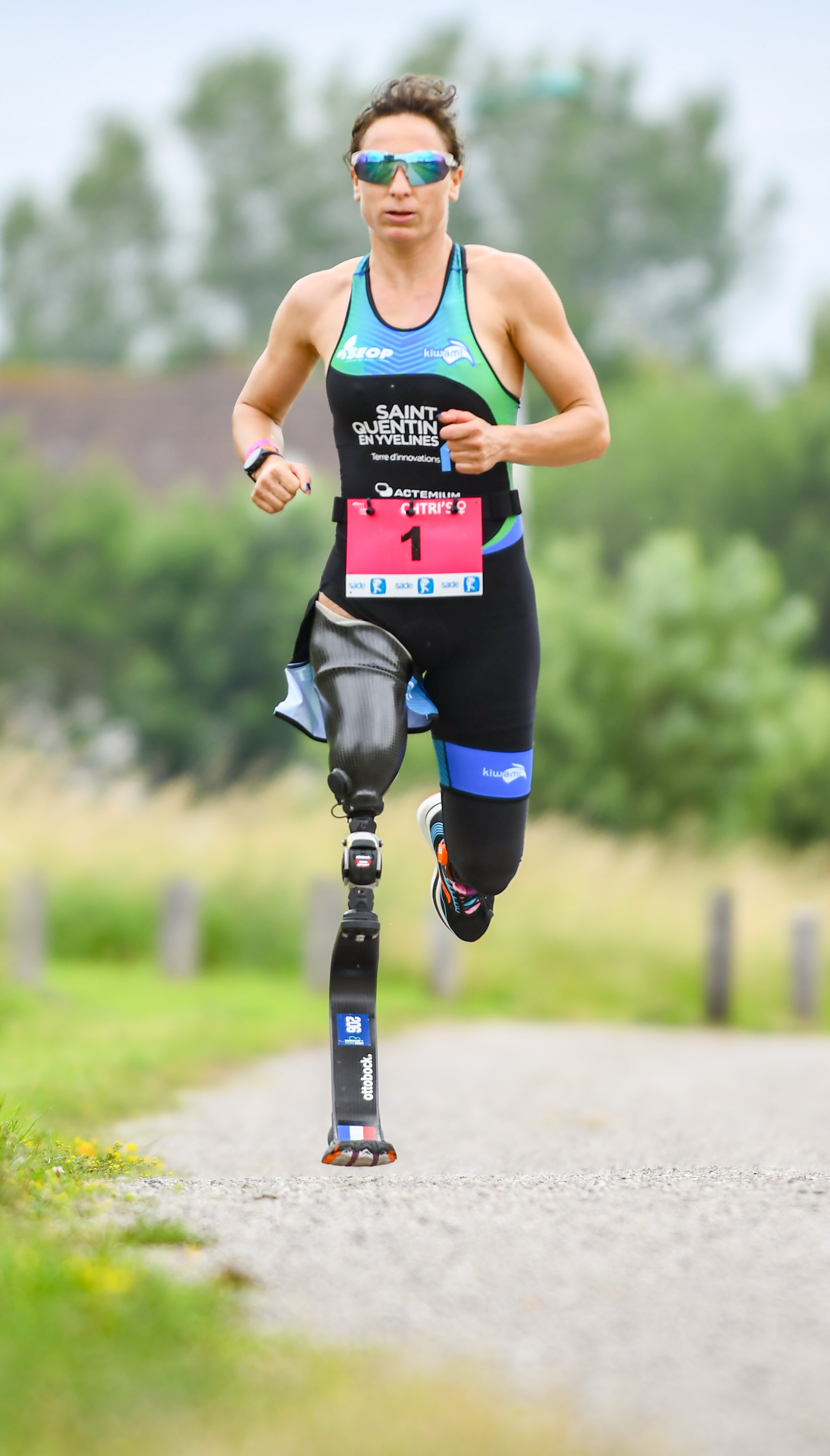

Personal information
- National team: France
- Born: 14 May 1983 (age 43) Pithiviers, France

Sport
- Sport: Paratriathlon
Medal record
Women's paratriathlon
Representing France
European Championships
Gold medal – first place	2023 Madrid	PTS2
Gold medal – first place	2024 Vichy	PTS2

Cécile Saboureau (born 14 May 1983) is a French paratriathlete. She is a two-time French champion and PTS2 European champion in 2023.

== Early life and amputation ==
During her youth, Saboureau was a professional rider. Beginning at age 12, she had participated in the French and European show jumping equestrian championships and won several titles. In 2004, when Saboureau was 20 years old, she was the victim of a car accident that caused her to have to amputate a large part of her right leg. After two years of rehabilitation, she wore a femoral prosthesis, resumed equestrian competition and became the French disabled show jumping champion.

== Career ==
In July 2018, Saboureau began her paratriathlon career, registered with the Triathlon Club de Saint-Quentin en Yvelines, won her first French championship in Gravelines in 2018 in the PTS2 category and in December, she was selected for the French team. In 2020, she won the French paratriathlon champion title for the second time in Quiberon. Between 2018 and 2021, she stood on the podium several times at the triathlon world cup stages, and rose to 9th place in the world in her discipline. In addition, she took part in the European Running Clinics, the European para-athletics championships in Berlin organized by Ottobock.

Though selected for the French triathlon team for the 2020 Summer Paralympics, Saboureau withdrew at the end of July 2021, following a road accident during training. On 30 July 2021, Saboureau was in the middle of a cycling training session on a departmental road near Vichy with the French team. While she had priority, a truck cut her off and, not having seen her, her head got stuck in the dumpster and the trucker fled. She escaped with several fractures. To avoid wearing a corset for four months, she chose to have spinal surgery using spinejack cementoplasty.

== Personal life ==
Saboureau obtained a diploma in equine ethology at the Haras de la Cense in Rochefort-en-Yvelines, as well as a federal certificate in equine handi supervision (BFEEH). She is an equine ethology teacher and riding instructor. She is president and founder of the Association sport handicap et autonomie (A.S.H.A), she is also an ambassador for Ottobock, whose prosthesis she wears and the Alice Milliat Foundation. She is also involved in other associations which are "Mobiles en Ville" and the "Association for the defense and study of amputees". On 14 and 15 June 2018, she volunteered at the fourth edition of the Handisport Paris Open which takes place at Stade Sébastien Charléty.

As of 2021, Saboureau resides in Élancourt.
