= Ronan Cordeiro =

Brazilian paratriathlete (born 1997)

Personal information
- Full name: Ronan Nunes Cordeiro
- Born: 10 August 1997 (age 29) Curitiba, Paraná, Brazil

Sport
- Country: Brazil
- Sport: Paratriathlon
- Disability class: PTS5
Medal record
Men's paratriathlon
Representing Brazil
Paralympic Games
Disqualified	2024 Paris	PTS5
World Championships
Bronze medal – third place	2021 Abu Dhabi	PTS5
Bronze medal – third place	2023 Ponteverde	Mixed relay
Americas Championships
Gold medal – first place	2022 Sarasota-Bradenton	PTS5
Silver medal – second place	2023 Sarasota	PTS5
Bronze medal – third place	2024 Miami	PTS5

Ronan Nunes Cordeiro (born 10 August 1997) is a Brazilian paratriathlete.

== Career ==
Cordeiro represented Brazil at the 2024 Summer Paralympics and won a silver medal in the PTS5 event.

=== Doping ===
On 2 September 2024, Cordeiro failed a drug test during the Paris Paralympics – the paratriathlete provided an in-competition urine sample that returned an adverse analytical finding (AAF) testing positive for an anabolic androgenic steroid, 19-norandrosterone (19-NA). The International Paralympic Committee (IPC) charged Cordeiro with an anti-doping rule violation (ADRV) and he was placed on provisional suspension in October 2024. The Brazilian denied the allegation and requested a hearing before the IPC's Independent Anti-Doping Tribunal.

The hearing of Cordeiro's case took place on 28 January 2026. After reviewing the evidence, the Tribunal upheld the IPC's charge and imposed the full consequences on the basis of anti-doping rule violations.

As a result, all of Cordeiro's results from the Men's PTS5 event at Paris 2024 have been disqualified, including the forfeiture of his silver medal, as well as any associated points and prizes.
