= Alison Peasgood =

British paratriathlete (born 1987)

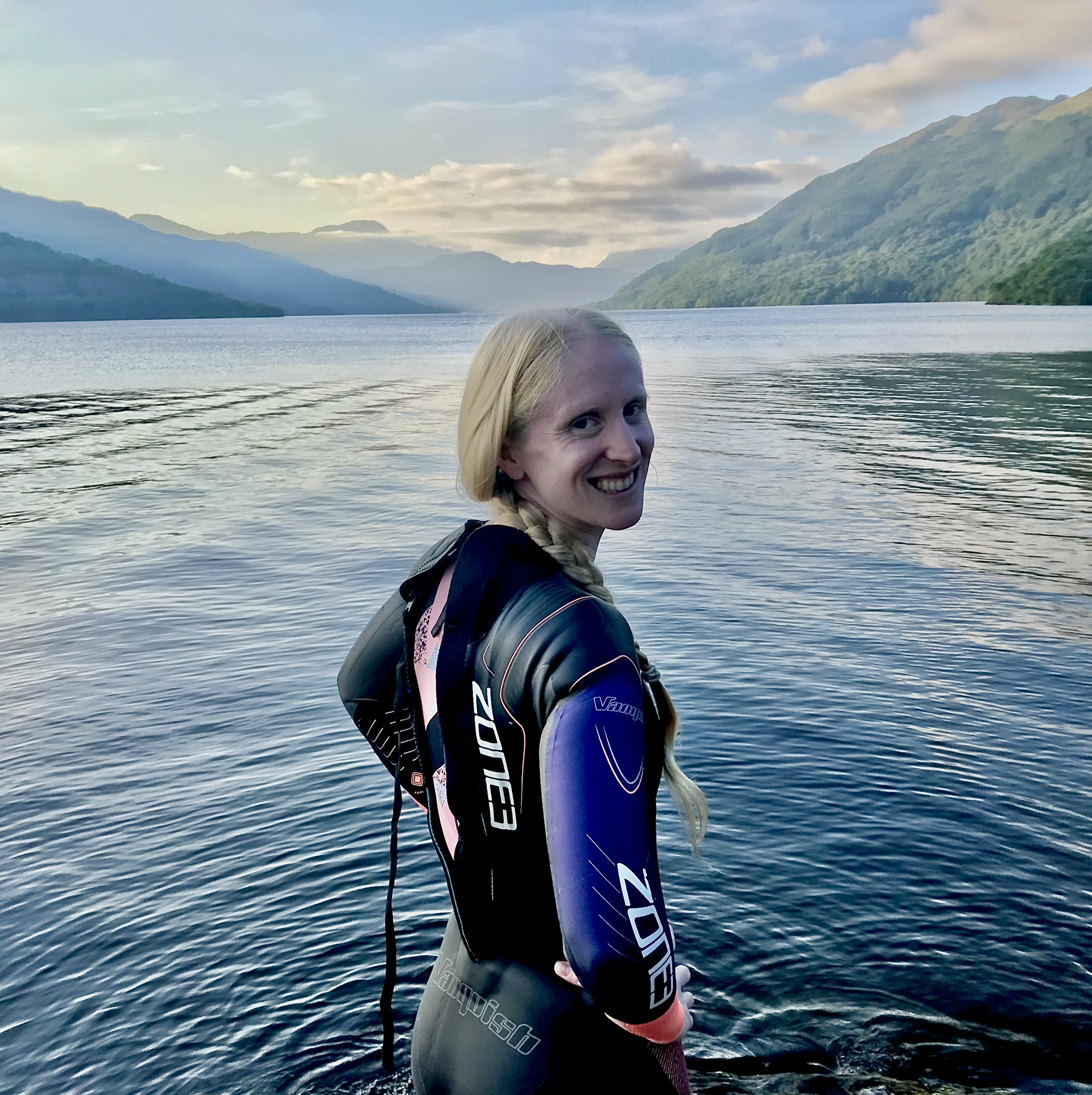
- Alison Peasgood at Loch Lomond

Personal information
- Nationality: British
- Born: Alison Patrick; 1 October 1987 (age 38) Kirkcaldy, Scotland

Sport
- Sport: Paratriathlon
Medal record
Women's paratriathlon
Representing Great Britain
Paralympic Games
Silver medal – second place	2016 Rio de Janeiro	PT5
World Championships
Gold medal – first place	2014 Edmonton	PT5
Gold medal – first place	2016 Rotterdam	PT5
Silver medal – second place	2015 Chicago	PT5
Silver medal – second place	2018 Gold Coast	PTVI
Bronze medal – third place	2021 Abu Dhabi	PTVI
Bronze medal – third place	2022 Abu Dhabi	PTVI
European Championships
Gold medal – first place	2015 Geneva	PT5
Gold medal – first place	2016 Lisbon	PT5
Gold medal – first place	2018 Tartu	PTVI
Silver medal – second place	2022 Olsztyn	PTVI
Bronze medal – third place	2014 Kitzbühel	PT5

Alison Peasgood (born Alison Patrick; 1 October 1987) is a British paratriathlete. She competed in the women's PT5 class at the 2016 Summer Paralympics and won a silver medal guided by Hazel Smith. She competed again at the 2024 Paralympics partnered by Brooke Gillies.

== Biography ==
Alison was born in 1987 with albinism. She was blind at birth and gained some sight afterwards, but has never had full vision. Moreover, she has nystagmus, which causes eye movement, and her albinism makes her, and particularly her eyes, sensitive to light. Alison worked as a physiotherapist at Victoria Hospital in Dunfermline until she moved to Loughborough.

Paratriathlon became an Olympic sport at the 2016 Rio Paralympics. Patrick took the silver medal in the PT5 class behind Katie Kelly of Australia. Her guide for the race was Hazel Smith who is a Durham Engineer. They had trained for two years before the Olympics. They started out with a coffee together and went on to going on tandem bike rides together. Smith was already a tri-athlete having been reserve for the team at 2014 Commonwealth games.

Alison was voted "West Fife's Sports Personality of the Year ".

In March 2017 she competed at the UCI Para-cycling Track World Championships in Los Angeles. She teamed up with cyclist Helen Scott and they gained two more medals. Their tandem came third in the 1 km time trial and they gained a silver at the tandem sprint behind Thornhill and Hall.

She came fourth in the postponed Paralympics in Tokyo.

She competed again at her third Paralympics in 2024 in Paris partnered by Brooke Gillies who made her paralympics debut. Gillies had moved down to Loughborough to train with her but their work together was delayed until Peasgood gave birth to a child. She was again fourth in Paris in an event won by Susana Rodriguez from Spain.
