= Melissa Reid (paratriathlete) =

British Paralympic triathlete

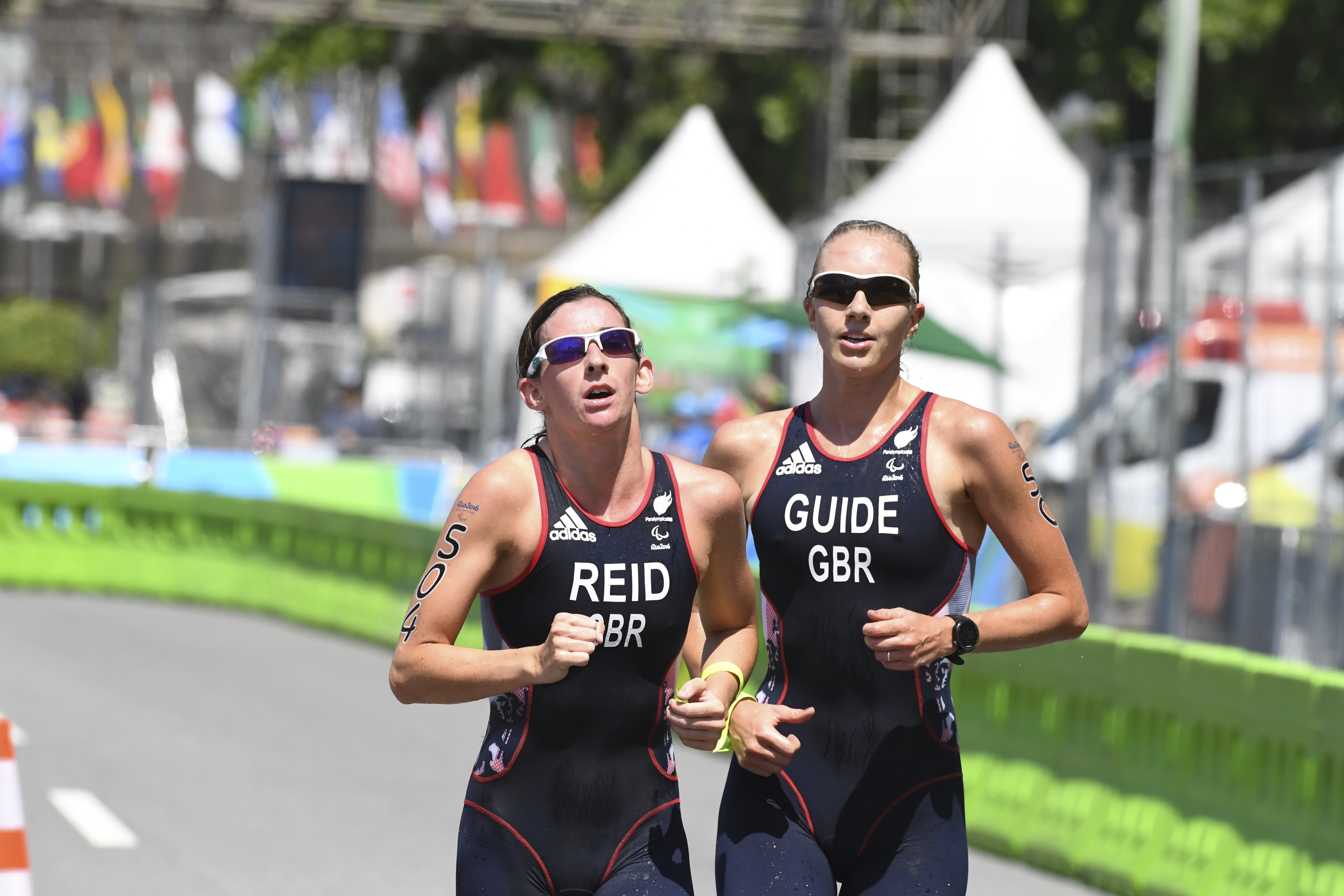
- Melissa Reid (paratriathlete)

Personal information
- Nationality: British
- Born: 15 November 1990 (age 35) Nottinghamshire, England, United Kingdom

Sport
- Sport: Paratriathlon
Medal record
Representing Great Britain
Women's paratriathlon
Paralympic Games
Bronze medal – third place	2016 Rio de Janeiro	PT5
World Championships
Gold medal – first place	2013 London	TRI 6b
Silver medal – second place	2012 Auckland	TRI 6
Silver medal – second place	2014 Edmonton	PT5
Silver medal – second place	2019 Lausanne	PTVI
Bronze medal – third place	2016 Rotterdam	PT5
Bronze medal – third place	2017 Rotterdam	PTVI
European Championships
Gold medal – first place	2013 Alanya	TRI 6b
Gold medal – first place	2017 Kitzbühel	PTVI
Silver medal – second place	2014 Kitzbühel	PT5
Silver medal – second place	2016 Lisbon	PT5
Silver medal – second place	2019 Valencia	PTVI
Bronze medal – third place	2015 Geneva	PT5
Women's para-aquathlon
World Championships
Gold medal – first place	2012 Auckland	TRI 6
Gold medal – first place	2013 London	TRI 6b
Gold medal – first place	2014 Edmonton	PT5
Gold medal – first place	2015 Chicago	PT5

Melissa Reid (born 15 November 1990) is a visually impaired British paratriathlete who competes in the PTVI classification. She is a Paralympic bronze medallist and a former World and European Champion. She is based in Falmouth in Cornwall.

== Career ==
Reid competes with a guide athlete in the PTVI category and was first selected for the British Triathlon Paratriathlon squad in 2012 having finished second at the 2011 ITU World Championship Series in London. Reid won her first national gold at the GBR Paratriathlon National Championships in 2013. She became ITU World Champion in 2013 and won the ETU European Championships in 2013 and 2017. She also competed for ParalympicsGB and won a bronze medal at the Rio de Janeiro Paralympic Games in 2016 in the Women's PT5 class for visually impaired athletes.

The 2017 season, saw her win gold at the Kitzbühel ETU Triathlon European Championships, she also won two bronze medals one at the Yokohama ITU World Paratriathlon Series and one at the ITU World Triathlon Grand Final Rotterdam. Reid suffered a prolapsed disc towards the tail end of 2017 which put her out of contention for 18 months.

Despite the injury, her 2019 return saw her win two golds at the Besançon ITU Paratriathlon World Cup and the Magog ITU Paratriathlon World Cup. Reid went on to claim three consecutive silvers at the ITU World Triathlon Grand Final Lausanne, Tokyo ITU Paratriathlon World Cup and the Valencia ETU Paratriathlon European Championships in 2019.

During the COVID-19 lockdown she decided to switch her guide partner to Hazel Smith who had experience working with paratriathlete Alison Peasgood (then Alison Patrick) when she became world champion. Together they had to work out how they could train together for each of the three disciplines.

== Early life ==
Reid was born in Nottinghamshire and moved to Cornwall when she was ten. She is a member of Gyllngvase club and was introduced to triathlon by her father, having previously taken part in surfing, swimming and surf life saving.

== Competitions ==
The following list of results. Unless indicated otherwise, the competitions are triathlons.

Date	Competition	Rank
2019-09-14	Valencia ETU Paratriathlon European Championships	2
2019-09-01	ITU World Triathlon Grand Final Lausanne	2
2019-08-17	Tokyo ITU Paratriathlon World Cup	2
2019-07-13	Magog ITU Paratriathlon World Cup	1
2019-06-16	Besançon ITU Paratriathlon World Cup	1
2019-05-18	Yokohama ITU World Paratriathlon Series	3
2017-09-15	ITU World Triathlon Grand Final Rotterdam	3
2017-06-16	Kitzbuhel ETU Triathlon European Championships	1
2017-05-13	Yokohama ITU World Paratriathlon Series	3

DNF = Did not finish

DNS = Did not start

DSQ = Disqualified
