= Michele Ferrarin =

Italian Paralympic athlete (born 1971)

Personal information
- Born: 11 August 1971 (age 54) Verona, Italy

Sport
- Country: Italy
- Sport: Paralympic swimming Paratriathlon
- Disability: Spinal muscular atrophy
- Club: Fiamme Oro
Medal record
Men's paratriathlon
Representing Italy
Paralympic Games
Silver medal – second place	2016 Rio de Janeiro	Men's PT2
World Championships
Gold medal – first place	2013 London	TRI 3
Gold medal – first place	2015 Chicago	PT2
Silver medal – second place	2014 Edmonton	PT2

Michele Ferrarin (born 11 August 1971) is an Italian paratriathlete and swimmer. Born in Verona, he represented Italy at the 2016 Summer Paralympics in Rio de Janeiro, Brazil and he won the silver medal in the men's PT2 event. He also represented Italy at the 2012 Summer Paralympics in London, United Kingdom in swimming without winning a medal.
