= Andrew Lewis (triathlete) =

British paratriathlete (born 1983)

Andrew Lewis MBE
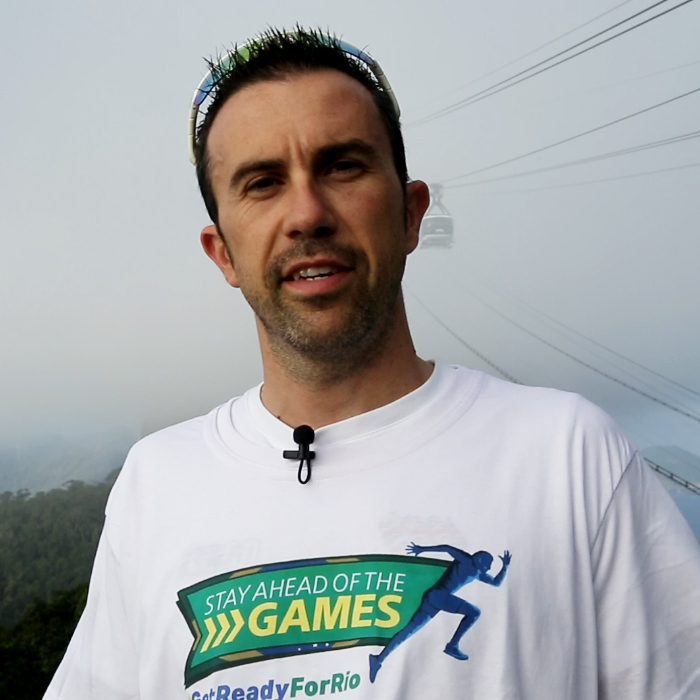
- Lewis in 2015

Personal information
- Full name: Andrew James Lewis
- National team: Great Britain
- Born: 24 January 1983 (age 43)

Sport
- Sport: Paratriathlon
- Disability: Amputee
- Disability class: PT2

Achievements and titles
- World finals: World Championships 2016 Gold
Medal record
Men's para triathlon
Representing Great Britain
Paralympic Games
Gold medal – first place	2016 Rio	PT2
World Championships
Gold medal – first place	2016 Rotterdam	PT2
Gold medal – first place	2017 Rotterdam	PTS2
Silver medal – second place	2018 Gold Coast	PTS2
Silver medal – second place	2019 Lausanne	PTS2
European Championships
Gold medal – first place	2016 Lisbon	PT2
Gold medal – first place	2017 Kitzbühel	PTS2
Silver medal – second place	2018 Tartu	PTS2
Silver medal – second place	2019 Valencia	PTS2

Andrew James Lewis (born 24 January 1983) is a retired British paratriathlete. Lewis is one of Britain's most successful PT2 paratriathletes, winning gold medals at European, world and Paralympic levels.

== Background ==
As a youngster, Lewis competed for Gloucestershire as a cross-country runner. At the age of 16 he was involved in a motorcycle accident, which eventually resulted in a through the knee amputation in his right leg when he was 22.

== Career ==
Lewis took up paratriathlon in 2013, competing in the men's PT2 category from 2014. In August 2014 he won the British Paratriathlon National Championships. His first major title came in May 2016, when he finished in first place at the ETU Triathlon European Championships, in Lisbon. In July of the same year he took the gold medal at the Paratriathlon World Championships in Rotterdam, before also going on to take gold at the 2016 Paralympics in Rio.

Lewis was awarded an MBE for services to triathlon, in the 2017 New Year Honours list.

In 2020 Lewis retired from competitive paratriathlon to launch a mental health business.

== Personal life ==
Lewis lives in Whitecroft, in the Forest of Dean, Gloucestershire, with his wife and two children.
