= Martin Schulz (paratriathlete) =

German paratriathlete (born 1990)

Personal information
- Full name: Martin Schulz
- Nationality: German
- Born: 17 March 1990 (age 36) Oschatz, Germany
Medal record
Men's paratriathlon
Representing Germany
Paralympic Games
Gold medal – first place	2016 Rio de Janeiro	PT4
Gold medal – first place	2020 Tokyo	PTS5
Bronze medal – third place	2024 Paris	PTS5
World Championships
Gold medal – first place	2013 London	TRI 4
Gold medal – first place	2014 Edmonton	PT4
Gold medal – first place	2016 Rotterdam	PT4
Gold medal – first place	2023 Ponteverde	PTS5
Silver medal – second place	2012 Auckland	TRI 4
Silver medal – second place	2015 Chicago	PT4
Silver medal – second place	2018 Gold Coast	PTS5
Silver medal – second place	2019 Lausanne	PTS5
Silver medal – second place	2022 Abu Dhabi	PTS5
Silver medal – second place	2026 Pontevedra	PTS5
Bronze medal – third place	2025 Wollongong	PTS5
European Championships
Gold medal – first place	2012 Eilat	TRI 4
Gold medal – first place	2013 Alanya	TRI 4
Gold medal – first place	2014 Kitzbühel	PT4
Gold medal – first place	2015 Geneva	PT4
Gold medal – first place	2016 Lisbon	PT4
Gold medal – first place	2017 Kitzbühel	PTS5
Gold medal – first place	2018 Tartu	PTS5
Gold medal – first place	2019 Valencia	PTS5
Gold medal – first place	2021 Valencia	PTS5
Gold medal – first place	2022 Olsztyn	PTS5
Gold medal – first place	2023 Madrid	PTS5
Gold medal – first place	2025 Besançon	PTS5

Martin Schulz (born 17 March 1990) is a PTS5 class paratriathlete who had his debut in the sport in 2012. He represented Germany at the 2016 and 2020 Summer Paralympics in paratriathlon, winning gold medals in the men's PT4 & PTS5 events. He has a limb deficiency and a missing lower left arm.
