= Hailey Danz =

American paratriathlete (born 1991)

Personal information
- Born: Hailey Danisewicz; January 9, 1991 (age 35) Wauwatosa, Wisconsin

Sport
- Country: United States
- Sport: Paratriathlon
- Disability class: PTS2
Medal record
Representing United States
Paralympic Games
Gold medal – first place	2024 Paris	PTS2
Silver medal – second place	2016 Rio de Janeiro	PT2
Silver medal – second place	2020 Tokyo	PTS2
World Championships
Gold medal – first place	2013 London	TRI 2
Gold medal – first place	2021 Abu Dhabi	PTS2
Gold medal – first place	2022 Abu Dhabi	PTS2
Gold medal – first place	2023 Ponteverde	PTS2
Gold medal – first place	2026 Pontevedra	PTS2
Silver medal – second place	2012 Auckland	TRI 2
Silver medal – second place	2014 Edmonton	PT2
Silver medal – second place	2015 Chicago	PT2
Silver medal – second place	2025 Wollongong	PTS2
Bronze medal – third place	2016 Rotterdam	PT2
Bronze medal – third place	2018 Gold Coast	PTS2
Bronze medal – third place	2019 Lausanne	PTS2
Americas Championships
Gold medal – first place	2014 Dallas	PT2
Gold medal – first place	2015 Monterrey	PT2
Gold medal – first place	2018 Sarasota-Bradenton	PTS2
Gold medal – first place	2019 Sarasota-Bradenton	PTS2
Gold medal – first place	2021 Pleasant Prairie	PTS2
Gold medal – first place	2022 Sarasota-Bradenton	PTS2
Gold medal – first place	2023 Sarasota	PTS2
Silver medal – second place	2024 Miami	PTS2

Hailey Danz (née: Danisewicz, born January 9, 1991) is an American paratriathlete.

== Career ==
She won the gold medal in the women's PTS2 event at the 2024 Summer Paralympics held in Paris, France. In 2016, she won the silver medal in the women's PT2 event at the Summer Paralympics held in Rio de Janeiro, Brazil. She also won the silver medal in the women's PTS2 event at the 2020 Summer Paralympics held in Tokyo, Japan.

== Personal life ==
Danz attended Wauwatosa East High School in Wauwatosa, Wisconsin. She is openly gay.
