= Rakel Mateo =

Spanish paratriathlete

Rakel Mateo Uriarte
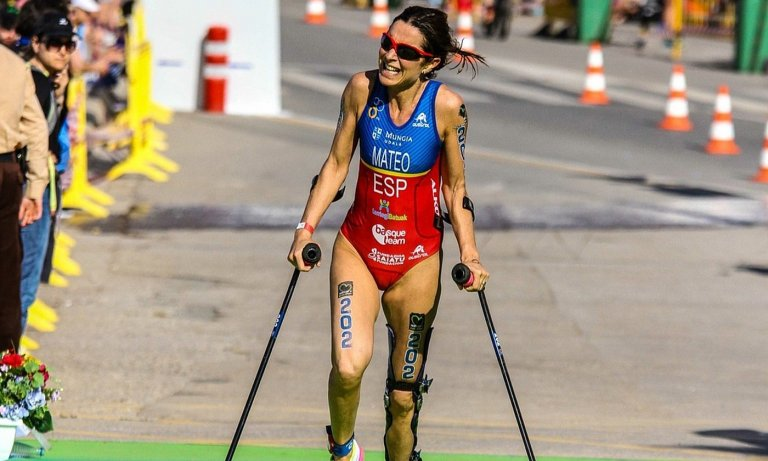

Personal information
- Born: 13 June 1975 (age 51) Mungia, Spain

Sport
- Country: Spain
- Sport: Paratriathlon
- Disability class: PT2
Medal record
Women's paratriathlon
Representing Spain
European Triathlon Championships
Silver medal – second place	2018 Tartu	PT2
Bronze medal – third place	2015 Geneva	PT2
Bronze medal – third place	2021 Valencia	PTS2

Rakel Mateo Uriate (born 13 June 1975) is a Spanish paratriathlete who competes in international level events. She is three time Spanish paratriathlon champion and double European medalist.

Mateo Uriate sustained paralysis in her left leg after an accident in 2001.
