= Katie Kelly (paratriathlete) =

Australian paratriathlete

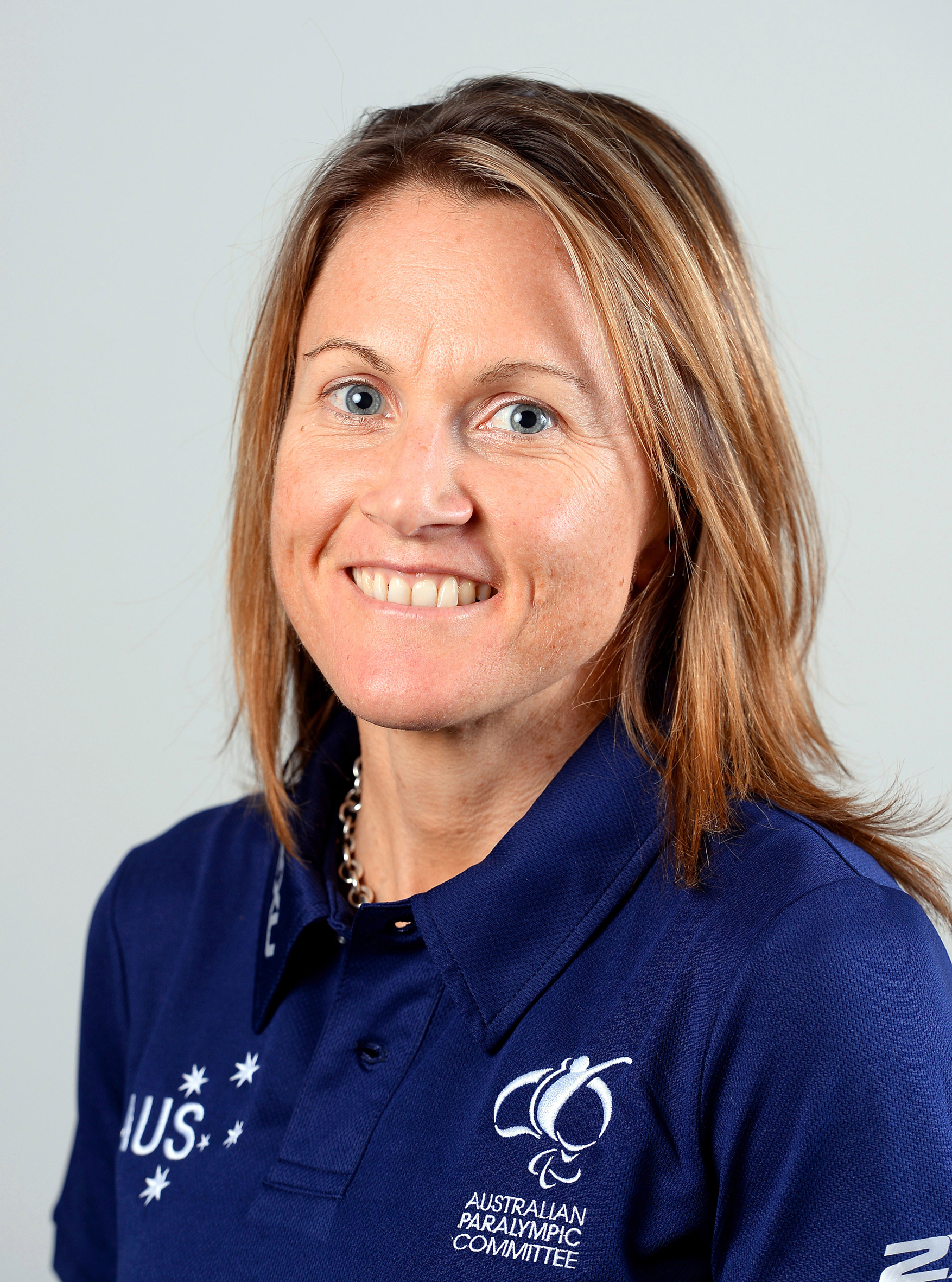
- Kelly in 2015

Personal information
- Nationality: (Australia) Australian
- Born: Kathleen Margaret Kelly; 6 February 1975 (age 51) Casino, New South Wales, Australia

Sport
- Sport: Paratriathlon
Medal record
Representing Australia
Paralympic Games
Gold medal – first place	2016 Rio de Janeiro	PT5
World Championships
Gold medal – first place	2015 Chicago	PT5
Gold medal – first place	2017 Rotterdam	PTV1
Bronze medal – third place	2018 Gold Coast	PTV1
Oceania Championships
Gold medal – first place	2019 Newcastle	PTVI
Gold medal – first place	2020 Newcastle	PTVI

Kathleen Margaret "Katie" Kelly OAM (born 6 February 1975) is an Australian paratriathlete, who has a degenerative disease known as Usher syndrome. Kelly began competing in the PT5 paratriathlon classification in February 2015 when her condition deteriorated to a legally blind state. She has just 30 per cent of her vision. With her guide Michellie Jones, Kelly won gold medals at the 2015 and 2017 ITU World Championships and 2016 Rio Paralympics. She competed at the 2020 Summer Paralympics.

== Personal life ==
Kelly was born on 6 February 1975 in Casino, New South Wales. She is one of five siblings, all of whom were heavily into sport. At the age of five she was diagnosed with poor hearing and subsequently has worn hearing aids. In her mid-20s she was diagnosed with Usher syndrome by an ophthalmologist. The loss of vision meant that she forfeited her driver's license. In January 2015, she was declared legally blind by an ophthalmologist.

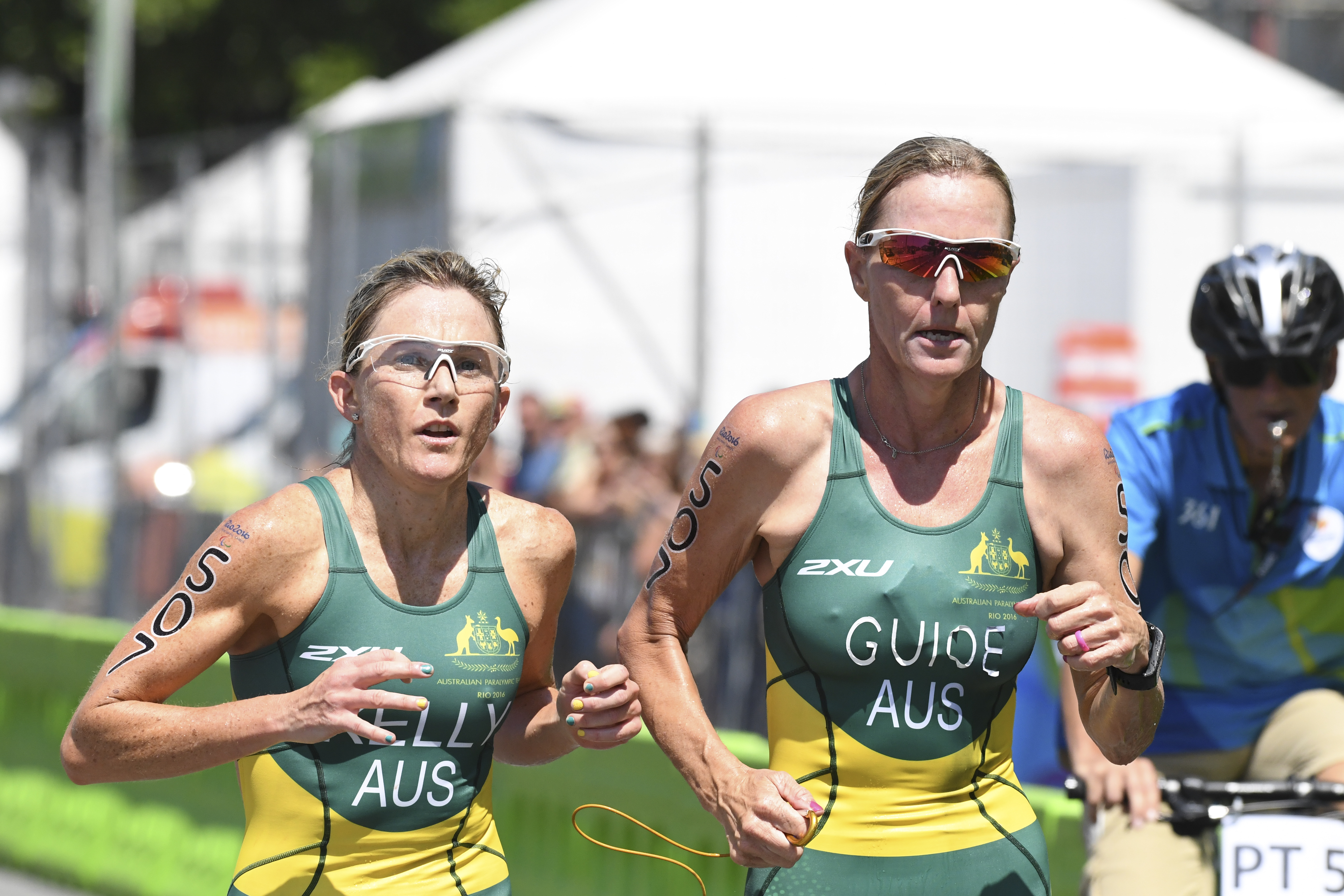
Kelly and Jones at the 2016 Paralympics

Kelly was educated at St Ursula's College and Downlands College, Toowoomba. She completed a Bachelor of Sports Management from Griffith University. In 2009, she gained her master's from the University of Technology Sydney.

Kelly has worked in the sports industry in roles with the National Rugby League, Melbourne Storm, ANZ Stadium, Newcastle Knights, Northern Territory Dept Sport and Recreation and Athletics NSW. She has also done pro bono work as media liaison officer for the Australian Blind Cricket Team and was a former media liaison officer for the Australian Deaflympic team at the 2005 Deaflympics that was held in Melbourne and was also a DSA board member.

In 2017, Kelly established the Sport Access Foundation to assist children with a disability with access to sport and recreational facilities.

== Sports career ==
Prior to moving into paratriathlon, Kelly was actively involved in sport particularly distance running and ironman events. She has competed in the New York Marathon. After being diagnosed as legally blind in January 2015, Kelly contacted the Australian Paralympic Committee regarding her eligibility to compete in paratriathlon. In February 2015, was classified as a vision impaired (PT5) paratriathlete.

On 13 March 2015, Kelly placed first at the ITU World Paratriathlon held at the Sunshine Coast, Queensland with her guide Laura Cook. Kelly completed a 750 m swim, 20 km bike ride and a 5 km run to beat her Japanese rival, Atsuko Yamada with a world-class time of 1:15:26. Two weeks later, Kelly placed first at the National Paratriathlon Championships in Redcliffe on 29 March 2015, with a time of 1:16:59. These titles led Kelly to be ranked number 13 in the world.

In May 2015 it was confirmed that two-time International Triathlon Union (ITU) world champion, Michellie Jones, would be Kelly's new guide in the lead up to the 2016 Summer Paralympics. With Jones, she won the World Paratriathlon Event held in Yokohama, Japan on 16 May 2015.

Kelly with guide Jones won her their first World Championship title after a come-from-behind victory at the 2015 World Championships Final in Chicago. Kelly's main aim is to make the Australian paratriathlon team for the 2016 Rio Paralympics. At the 2016 Rio Paralympics, Kelly with Jones as the guide won the gold medal in the Women's PT5 event. It was Australia's first medal in paratriathlon at the Summer Paralympics. At the 2017 ITU World Championships, Rotterdam, Kelly and Jones won the gold medal in Women's PTV1. It was their second world championship title.

She won the bronze medal with guide Holly Grice in the Women's PTV1 at 2018 World Championships at Gold Coast, Queensland after battling a stressed left metatarsal in the lead up to the event. At the 2019 ITU World Triathlon Grand Final in Lausanne, she finished eighth in the Women's PTVI.

Kelly's guide for 2020 Summer Paralympics was Briarna Silk and they trained with Triathlon Australia's High Performance Coach Dan Atkins on the Gold Coast. She finished sixth in Women's PTVI with a time of 1:13.01.

== Recognition ==
- 2016/17 – Sir Roden Cutler Award, Primary Club of Australia
- 2017 – Order of Australia Medal in 2017.
- 2017 – Triathlon Australia Female Performance of the Year.
- 2017 – Triathlon Australia Paratriathlete Performance of the Year.
- 2023 - Griffith University Sport Hall of Fame
- 2024 - Triathlon Australia Hall of Fame
