= Stefan Daniel =

Canadian Paralympic triathlete

Daniel Stefan
Personal information
- Full name: Stefan MF Daniel
- Born: February 22, 1997 (age 29) Calgary, Alberta, Canada
- Height: 1.75

Sport
- College team: University of Calgary Dinos
Medal record
Men's paratriathlon
Representing Canada
Paralympic Games
Silver medal – second place	2016 Rio de Janeiro	PT4
Bronze medal – third place	2020 Tokyo	PTS5
World Championships
Gold medal – first place	2015 Chicago	PT4
Gold medal – first place	2017 Rotterdam	PTS5
Gold medal – first place	2018 Gold Coast	PTS5
Gold medal – first place	2019 Lausanne	PTS5
Gold medal – first place	2022 Abu Dhabi	PTS5
Gold medal – first place	2024 Torremolinos	PTS5
Silver medal – second place	2014 Edmonton	PT4
Silver medal – second place	2023 Ponteverde	PTS5
Bronze medal – third place	2013 London	TRI 4
Americas Championships
Gold medal – first place	2014 Dallas	PT4
Gold medal – first place	2015 Monterrey	PT4
Gold medal – first place	2019 Sarasota-Bradenton	PTS5
Gold medal – first place	2021 Pleasant Prairie	PTS5
Gold medal – first place	2023 Sarasota	PTS5
Gold medal – first place	2024 Miami	PTS5
Bronze medal – third place	2022 Sarasota-Bradenton	PTS5

Stefan Daniel (born February 22, 1997) is a Canadian Paralympic triathlete. He won a silver medal at the 2016 Summer Paralympics in the Men's PT4. Stefan Daniel is a 2nd team All Canadian in USPORT Cross Country while competing for the University of Calgary, Dinos. In the 2020 Summer Paralympics he won the bronze medal in the Men's PTS5 category.

2 Time Host of "Project Stefan."

== Biography ==
Stefan shares a close bond with his brother, Christian, who has cerebral palsy. Christian is also an accomplished para-swimmer and they have been able to travel and compete together as part of Swimming Canada’s national development team.
