= Melissa Stockwell =

American triathlete, swimmer and former U.S. Army officer

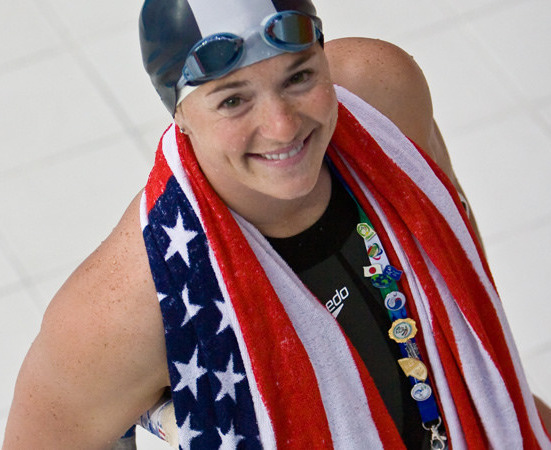
- Stockwell in 2011

Personal information
- Born: January 31, 1980 (age 46) Grand Haven, Michigan, U.S.
- Height: 5 ft 5 in (1.65 m)
- Weight: 130 lb (59 kg)
- Website: MelissaStockwell.com

Sport

Military service
- Branch/service: United States Army
- Years of service: 2002–2005
- Rank: First lieutenant
- Unit: 1st Cavalry Division
- Battles/wars: Iraq War
Medal record
Women's paratriathlon
Representing United States
Paralympic Games
Bronze medal – third place	2016 Rio de Janeiro	PT2
World Championships
Gold medal – first place	2010 Budapest	Tri 2
Gold medal – first place	2011 Beijing	Tri 2
Gold medal – first place	2012 Auckland	Tri 2
Silver medal – second place	2013 London	Tri 2
Silver medal – second place	2022 Abu Dhabi	PTS2
Bronze medal – third place	2015 Chicago	Tri 2
Americas Championships
Gold medal – first place	2024 Miami	PTS2
Silver medal – second place	2015 Monterrey	PT2
Silver medal – second place	2016 Sarasota	PT2

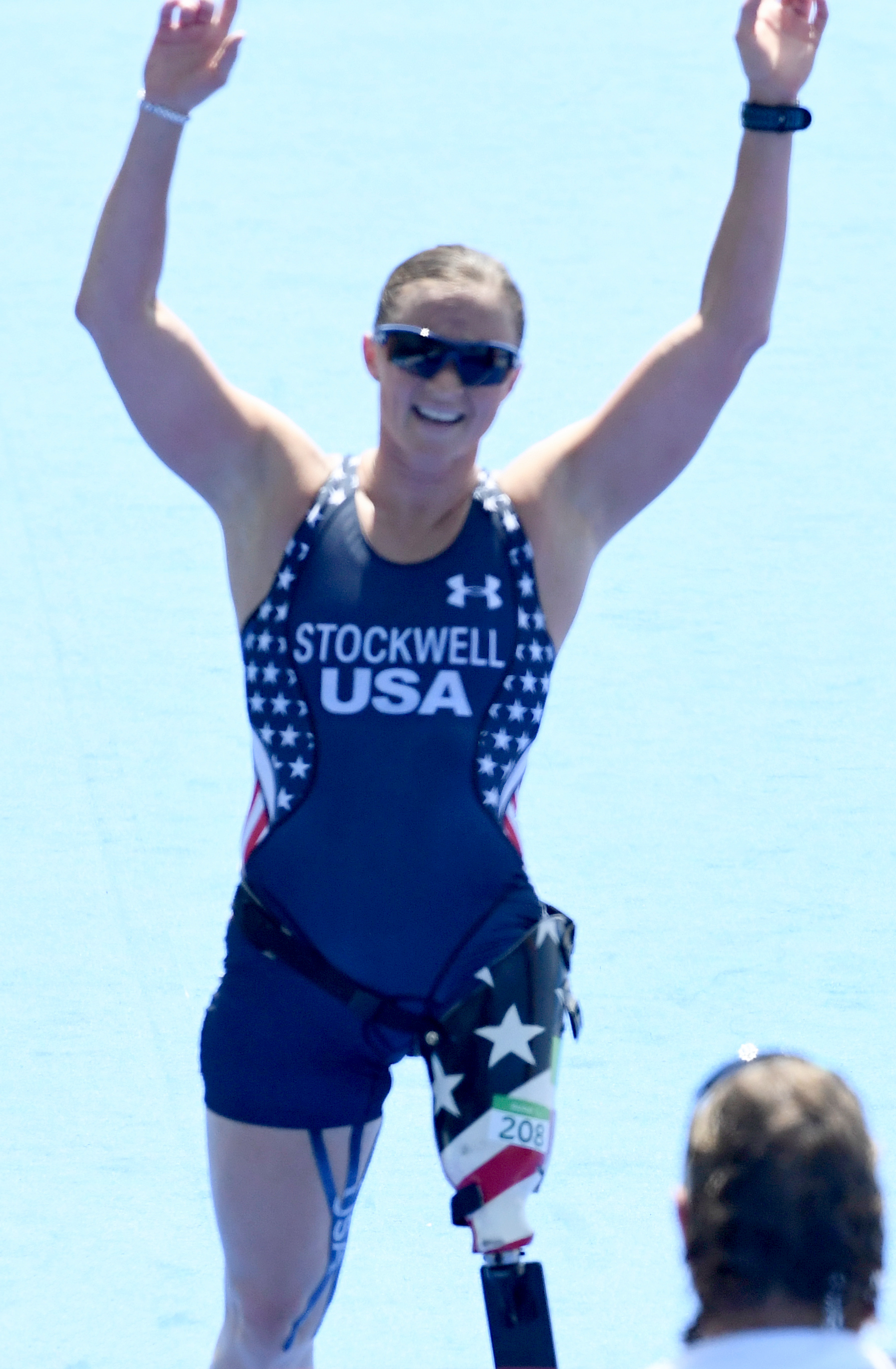
Melissa Stockwell at the 2016 Paralympics

Melissa Stockwell (born January 31, 1980) is an American two-time Paralympic triathlete, swimmer and former U.S. Army officer. Competing in the 2008 Summer Paralympics in three swimming events, she returned to race in the 2016 Paralympic Games and won a bronze medal in the inaugural triathlon event on September 11, 2016.

== Military career ==
She joined the ROTC at the University of Colorado in her sophomore year and was a senior in college when the September 11, 2001 attack happened. She had Transportation Officer Basic Course training in Virginia before being assigned to the 1st Cavalry Division at Fort Hood, Texas. She was deployed in March 2004 to Iraq.

A first lieutenant, she was the first female soldier to lose a limb in the Iraq War. She lost her left leg when a roadside bomb exploded when she was leading a convoy in Baghdad. For her service in Iraq she was awarded the Bronze Star and the Purple Heart. Following her retirement from the military she works as a prosthetist and served on the board of directors of the Wounded Warrior Project from 2005 to 2014.

== Sport ==
She subsequently became the first Iraq veteran chosen for the Paralympics. She competed in three swimming events, the 100 m butterfly, 100 m freestyle, and 400 m freestyle, at the 2008 Summer Paralympics, and finished sixth, fifth, and fourth in her heats, respectively. She was the U.S. team's flag bearer at the closing ceremonies.

Turning to triathlon after the Beijing Paralympics, Stockwell was selected to represent the US in the 2010 ITU Paratriathlon World Championships in Budapest. She won the Women's TRI-2 (above knee amputee) class, then successfully defended her TRI-2 World Champion title in 2011 and 2012. She is a multiple US National Paratriathlon Champion in her classification, and was named USAT Paratriathlete of the Year in 2010 and 2011. As of January 2013 Stockwell is at the top of the ITU's rankings in the women's TRI-2 class. She won a bronze medal in the PT2 category at the 2016 Paralympics.

Stockwell is a Level 1 USAT Triathlon coach and co-founder of Dare2Tri, a Chicago-based triathlon club specifically for athletes with disability.

== Filmography ==
- Warrior Champions: From Baghdad to Beijing, a documentary film by directors Brent Renaud and Craig Renaud.
