= Jairo Ruiz Lopez =

Spanish Paralympic triathlete

Jairo Ruiz
Personal information
- Full name: Jairo Ruiz Lopez
- Nationality: Spanish
- Born: 26 November 1988 (age 37) Almería, Spain
Medal record
Representing Spain
Men's paratriathlon
Paralympic Games
Bronze medal – third place	2016 Rio de Janeiro	PT4
World Championships
Silver medal – second place	2017 Rotterdam	PTS5
Bronze medal – third place	2016 Rotterdam	PT4
Bronze medal – third place	2024 Torremolinos	Mixed relay
European Championships
Silver medal – second place	2016 Lisbon	PT4
Silver medal – second place	2017 Kitzbühel	PTS5
Silver medal – second place	2018 Tartu	PTS5
Silver medal – second place	2019 Valencia	PTS5
Bronze medal – third place	2013 Alanya	TRI 4
Bronze medal – third place	2014 Kitzbühel	PT4
Men's para-duathlon
World Championships
Gold medal – first place	2016 Aviles	PT4
Gold medal – first place	2019 Pontevedra	PTS5

Jairo Ruiz Lopez (born 26 November 1988) is a Spanish Paralympic triathlete. He won a bronze medal at the 2016 Summer Paralympics in the Men's PT4.
