= Cycling at the 2016 Summer Paralympics – Men's road race =

The Men's road race cycling events at the 2016 Summer Paralympics took place on September 17 at Flamengo Park, Pontal. Events took place over eight events, spanning twelve classifications.

== Classification ==
Cyclists are given a classification depending on the type and extent of their disability. The classification system allows cyclists to compete against others with a similar level of function. The class number indicates the severity of impairment with "1" being most impaired.

Cycling classes are:

- B: Blind and visually impaired cyclists use a Tandem bicycle with a sighted pilot on the front
- H 1–4: Cyclists with an impairment that affects their legs use a handcycle
- T 1–2: Cyclists with an impairment that affects their balance use a tricycle
- C 1-5: Cyclists with an impairment that affects their legs, arms and/or trunk but are capable of using a standard bicycle

== Men's road races ==
=== B ===
Class	Gold	Silver	Bronze
B	Vincent Ter Schure; Netherlands	Ignacio Ávila; Spain	Steve Bate; Great Britain

=== H2 ===
Class	Gold	Silver	Bronze
H2	William Groulx; United States	Luca Mazzone; Italy	Tobias Fankhauser; Switzerland

=== H3 ===
Class	Gold	Silver	Bronze
H3	Paolo Cecchetto; Italy	Maximilian Weber; Germany	Charles Moreau; Canada

=== H4 ===
Class	Gold	Silver	Bronze
H4	Vico Merklein; Germany	Rafał Wilk; Poland	Joël Jeannot; France

=== H5 ===
Class	Gold	Silver	Bronze
H5	Ernst van Dyk; South Africa	Alessandro Zanardi; Italy	Jetze Plat; Netherlands

=== C1-3 ===
Class	Gold	Silver	Bronze
C1-3	Steffen Warias; Germany	Kris Bosmans; Belgium	Fabio Anobile; Italy

=== C4-5 ===
Class	Gold	Silver	Bronze
C4-5	Daniel Abraham Gebru; Netherlands	Lauro César Chaman; Brazil	Andrea Tarlao; Italy

=== T1-2 ===
Class	Gold	Silver	Bronze
T1–2	Hans-Peter Durst; Germany	David Stone; Great Britain	Néstor Ayala Ayala; Colombia
