= Cycling at the 2016 Summer Paralympics – Men's road time trial =

(2016) Paralympic Cycling Road time trials

The Men's road time trial cycling events at the 2016 Summer Paralympics took place on September 17 at Flamengo Park, Pontal. Eleven events took place over twelve classifications. The T1-2 time trial, which took in two classifications, was a 'factored' event, with times adjusted by classification to allow fair competition.

== Classification ==
Cyclists are given a classification depending on the type and extent of their disability. The classification system allows cyclists to compete against others with a similar level of function. The class number indicates the severity of impairment with "1" being most impaired.

Cycling classes are:

- B: Blind and visually impaired cyclists use a Tandem bicycle with a sighted pilot on the front
- H 1–4: Cyclists with an impairment that affects their legs use a handcycle
- T 1–2: Cyclists with an impairment that affects their balance use a tricycle
- C 1-5: Cyclists with an impairment that affects their legs, arms and/or trunk but are capable of using a standard bicycle

== Men's time trials ==
=== B ===
Class	Gold	Silver	Bronze
B	Steve Bate pilot : Adam Duggleby; Great Britain	Vincent Ter Schure pilot : Timo Fransen; Netherlands	Kieran Modra pilot: David Edwards; Australia

=== H2 ===
Class	Gold	Silver	Bronze
H2	Luca Mazzone; Italy	William Groulx; United States	Brian Sheridan; United States

=== H3 ===
Class	Gold	Silver	Bronze
H3	Vittorio Podestà; Italy	Walter Ablinger; Austria	Charles Moreau; Canada

=== H4 ===
Class	Gold	Silver	Bronze
H4	Rafał Wilk; Poland	Thomas Fruhwirth; Austria	Vico Merklein; Germany

=== H5 ===
Class	Gold	Silver	Bronze
H5	Alessandro Zanardi; Italy	Stuart Tripp; Australia	Oscar Sanchez; United States

=== C1 ===
Class	Gold	Silver	Bronze
C1	Michael Teuber; Germany	Ross Wilson; Canada	Giancarlo Masini; Italy

=== C2 ===
Class	Gold	Silver	Bronze
C2	Tristen Chernove; Canada	Colin Lynch; Ireland	Liang Guihua; China

=== C3 ===
Class	Gold	Silver	Bronze
C3	Eoghan Clifford; Ireland	Masaki Fujita; Japan	Michael Sametz; Canada

=== C4 ===
Class	Gold	Silver	Bronze
C4	Jozef Metelka; Slovakia	Kyle Bridgwood; Australia	Patrik Kuril; Slovakia

=== C5 ===
Class	Gold	Silver	Bronze
C5	Yegor Dementyev; Ukraine	Alistair Donohoe; Australia	Lauro Cesar Chaman; Brazil

=== T1-2 ===
Class	Gold	Silver	Bronze
T1–2	Hans-Peter Durst; Germany	Ryan Boyle; United States	David Stone; Great Britain
