= Italy at the 2016 Summer Paralympics =

- IPC code: ITA
- NPC: Comitato Italiano Paralimpico
- Website: Official website

in Rio de Janeiro
- Competitors: 101 in 14 sports
- Flag bearers: Martina Caironi (gold) (silver) (opening); Beatrice Vio (gold) (bronze) (closing)
- Medals Ranked 9th: Gold 10 Silver 14 Bronze 15 Total 39

Summer Paralympics appearances (overview)
- 1960; 1964; 1968; 1972; 1976; 1980; 1984; 1988; 1992; 1996; 2000; 2004; 2008; 2012; 2016; 2020; 2024

Italy competed at the 2016 Summer Paralympics in Rio de Janeiro, Brazil, from 7 September to 18 September 2016. Martina Caironi was chosen to carry the nation's flag at the opening ceremony.

== Medallists ==
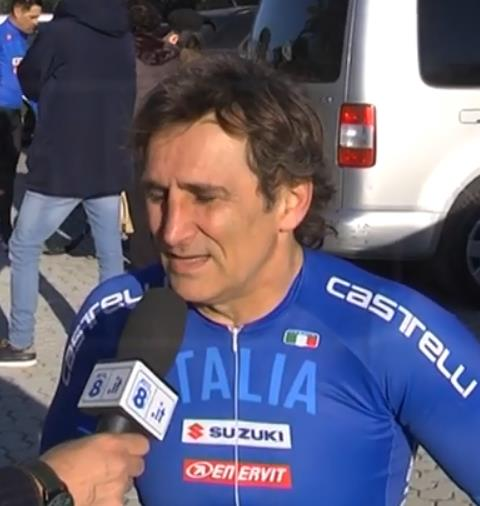
The legend Alex Zanardi, two gold medals at this edition.

Medal	Athlete	Sport	Event
Gold	Federico Morlacchi	Swimming	200 m medley SM9
Gold	Francesco Bocciardo	Swimming	400 m freestyle S6
Gold	Alex Zanardi	Cycling	Time Trial H5
Gold	Vittorio Podestà	Cycling	Time Trial H3
Gold	Luca Mazzone	Cycling	Time Trial H2
Gold	Assunta Legnante	Athletics	Shot Put women F11-12
Gold	Beatrice Vio	Fencing	Individual Foil CB
Gold	Paolo Cecchetto	Cycling	Road Race H3
Gold	Luca Mazzone; Vittorio Podestà; Alex Zanardi	Cycling	Relay Time Trial
Gold	Martina Caironi	Athletics	100 m women T42
Silver	Francesco Bettella	Swimming	100 m backstroke men S1
Silver	Federico Morlacchi	Swimming	400 m freestyle men S9
Silver	Michele Ferrarin	Paratriathlon	Men race PT2
Silver	Martina Caironi	Athletics	Long jump women T42
Silver	Cecilia Camellini	Swimming	400 m freestyle women S11
Silver	Giulia Ghiretti	Swimming	100 m breaststroke women SB4
Silver	Oney Tapia	Athletics	Discus throw men F11
Silver	Federico Morlacchi	Swimming	100 m breaststroke men SB8
Silver	Alberto Simonelli	Archery	Men's individual compound open
Silver	Luca Mazzone	Cycling	Road race men H2
Silver	Alex Zanardi	Cycling	Road race men H5
Silver	Federico Morlacchi	Swimming	100 m butterfly men S9
Silver	Francesco Bettella	Swimming	50 m backstroke men S1
Silver	Arjola Trimi	Swimming	50 m freestyle women S4
Bronze	Giovanni Achenza	Paratriathlon	Men's race PT1
Bronze	Giulia Ghiretti	Swimming	50 m butterfly women S5
Bronze	Vincenzo Boni	Swimming	50 m backstroke men S3
Bronze	Roberto Airoldi; Elisabetta Mijno	Archery	Team
Bronze	Giada Rossi	Table tennis	Women's single classes 1-2
Bronze	Amine Kalem	Table tennis	Men's single class 9
Bronze	Giancarlo Masini	Cycling	Men's time trial C1
Bronze	Francesca Porcellato	Cycling	Women's time trial H1-2-3
Bronze	Efrem Morelli	Swimming	50 m breaststroke men SB3
Bronze	Francesca Porcellato	Cycling	Women's road race H1-2-3-4
Bronze	Fabio Anobile	Cycling	Men's road race C1-2-3
Bronze	Andreea Mogos; Loredana Trigilia; Beatrice Vio	Fencing	Women's team foil
Bronze	Alvise De Vidi	Athletics	400 m men T51
Bronze	Andrea Tarlao	Cycling	Men's road race C4-5
Bronze	Monica Contrafatto	Athletics	100 m women T42

== Archery ==
Italy qualified nine archers for the Rio Games following their performance at the 2015 World Archery Para Championships and the 2016 European Qualifier Event. This included four spots in the compound open, 3 for men and 1 for a woman, 4 spots in the recurve open with 2 for a man and 2 for a woman, and 1 spot for a man in the W1 event.

Men

Athlete	Event	Ranking Round		Round of 32	Round of 16	Quarterfinals	Semifinals	Finals	
Athlete	Event	Score	Seed	Opposition Score	Opposition Score	Opposition Score	Opposition Score	Opposition Score	Rank
Matteo Bonacina	Individual compound	661	19	Ai (CHN); L 135-143	Did not advance				
Giampaolo Cancelli	Individual compound	670	11	Evans (CAN); W 146-128	Pavlik (SVK); L 134-140	Did not advance			
Alberto Simonelli	Individual compound	678	7	Medvedev (KAZ); W 137-121	Forsberg (FIN); W140-136	Hall (GBR); W143-136	Ai (CHN); W 146-144	Shelby (USA); L 143-144	2nd place, silver medalist(s)
Fabio Luca Azzolini	Individual compound W1	570	13	—N/a	Yenier (TUR); L 131-138	Did not advance			
Roberto Airoldi	Individual recurve open	624	6	Rezende (BRA); L 5-6	Did not advance				
Alessandro Erario	Individual recurve open	601	15	Onedera (JPN); W 6-0	Netsiri (THA); L 1-7	Did not advance			

Women

Athlete	Event	Ranking Round		Round of 32	Round of 16	Quarterfinals	Semifinals	Finals	
Athlete	Event	Score	Seed	Opposition Score	Opposition Score	Opposition Score	Opposition Score	Opposition Score	Rank
Eleonora Sarti	Individual compound open	649	7	—N/a	Grinham (GBR); L 132-133	Did not advance			
Elisabetta Mijno	Individual recurve open	601	10	Nemati (IRI); L 4-6	Did not advance				
Veronica Floreno	Individual recurve open	549	22	Hess (GER); W 6-4	Lee (KOR); L 0-6	Did not advance			

Mixed

Athlete	Event	Ranking Round		Round of 16	Quarterfinals	Semifinals	Finals	
Athlete	Event	Score	Seed	Opposition Score	Opposition Score	Opposition Score	Opposition Score	Rank
Alberto Simonelli; Eleonora Sarti	Team compound open	1327	4	—N/a	Stubbs/ Grinham (GBR); L 149-150	Did not advance		
Elisabetta Mijno; Roberto Airoldi	Team recurve open	1225	4	Jonasts/ Melle (LAT); W 6-0	Cordeiro/ Dergovics (BRA); W 6-2	Nemati/ Ranjbarkivaj (IRI); L 0-6	Buyanjargal/ Dambadondog (MGL); W5-1	3rd place, bronze medalist(s)

== Athletics ==
Men's

Athletes	Event	Heats		Final	
Athletes	Event	Result	Rank	Result	Rank
Alvise De Vidi	100 metres T51	—N/a		22.73	5
Alvise De Vidi	400 metres T51	—N/a		1:22.38	3rd place, bronze medalist(s)
Emanuele di Marino	200 metres T44	24.74	6	Did not advance	
Emanuele di Marino	400 metres T44	DSQ		Did not advance	
Ruud Lorain Flovany Koutiki Tsilulu	400 metre T20	51.53	4 q	51.14	7
Alessandro di Lello	Marathon T46	DNS			
Roberto la Barbera	Long jump T44	—N/a		6.32	8
Oney Tapia	Shot put F12	—N/a		12.72	9
Oney Tapia	Discus throw F11	—N/a		40.89	2nd place, silver medalist(s)

Women's

Athletes	Event	Heats		Final	
Athletes	Event	Result	Rank	Result	Rank
Arjola Dedaj; Guide: Elisa Bettini	100 metres T11	13.43	3	Did not advance	
Arjola Dedaj; Guide: Elisa Bettini	200 metres T11	27.69	3	Did not advance	
Arjola Dedaj; Guide: Elisa Bettini	Long jump T11	—N/a		4.51	6
Oxana Corso	100 metres T35	—N/a		15.67	5
Oxana Corso	200 metres T35	—N/a		32.68	4
Martina Caironi	100 metres T42	14.80	1 Q	14.97	1st place, gold medalist(s)
Martina Caironi	Long jump T42	—N/a		4.66	2nd place, silver medalist(s)
Monica Graziana Contrafatto	100 metres T42	16.20	2 Q	16.30	3rd place, bronze medalist(s)
Giuseppina Versace	100 metres T44	14.42	6	Did not advance	
Giuseppina Versace	200 metres T44	28.13	3 Q	28.90	8
Giuseppina Versace	400 metres T44	—N/a		DSQ	
Federica Maspero	100 metres T44	14.37	5	Did not advance	
Federica Maspero	200 metres T44	29.04	5	Did not advance	
Federica Maspero	400 metres T44	—N/a		1:03.83	4
Assunta Legnante	Shot put F12	—N/a		15.74	1st place, gold medalist(s)
Assunta Legnante	Discus throw F11	—N/a		31.51	4

== Cycling ==
With one pathway for qualification being one highest ranked NPCs on the UCI Para-Cycling male and female Nations Ranking Lists on 31 December 2014, Italy qualified for the 2016 Summer Paralympics in Rio, assuming they continued to meet all other eligibility requirements.

=== Road ===
Men

Athlete	Event	Class	Time	Rank
Emanuele Bersini; Guide :Riccardo Panizza	Time trial	B	36:35.37	7
Emanuele Bersini; Guide :Riccardo Panizza	Road race	B	2:32:06	9
Luca Mazzone	Time trial	H2	32:07.09	1st place, gold medalist(s)
Luca Mazzone	Road race	H2	1:15:23	2nd place, silver medalist(s)
Vittorio Podestà	Time trial	H3	28:19.45	1st place, gold medalist(s)
Vittorio Podestà	Road race	H3	1:33:17	6
Paolo Cecchetto	Time trial	H3	34:41.41	13
Paolo Cecchetto	Road race	H3	1:33:17	1st place, gold medalist(s)
Alessandro Zanardi	Time trial	H5	28:36.81	1st place, gold medalist(s)
Alessandro Zanardi	Road race	H5	1:37:49	2nd place, silver medalist(s)
Giancarlo Masini	Time trial	C1	28:47.83	3rd place, bronze medalist(s)
Giancarlo Masini	Road race	C1-3	1:55:20	19
Fabio Anobile	Time trial	C3	41:03.19	7
Fabio Anobile	Road race	C1-3	1:49:11	3rd place, bronze medalist(s)
Andrea Tarlao	Time trial	C5	38:14.59	5
Andrea Tarlao	Road race	C4-5	2:13:46	3rd place, bronze medalist(s)
Pierpaolo Addesi	Time trial	C5	41:28.36	11
Pierpaolo Addesi	Road race	C4-5	2:15:41	7
Giorgio Farroni	Time trial	T1-2	38:14.59	5
Giorgio Farroni	Road race	T1-2	3:52:00	5
Vittorio Podestà; Luca Mazzone; Alessandro Zanardi	Mixed team relay		32:34:00	1st place, gold medalist(s)

Women

Athlete	Event	Class	Time	Rank
Francesca Porcellato	Time trial	H1-3	34:20.48	3rd place, bronze medalist(s)
Francesca Porcellato	Road race	H1-4	1:15:58	3rd place, bronze medalist(s)
Jenny Narcisi	Time trial	C4	32:19.73	6
Jenny Narcisi	Road race	C4-5	2:28:56	13

=== Track ===
Men

Athlete	Event	Class	Time	Rank
Giancarlo Masini	Time trial	1km C1-3	1:22.79	25
Giancarlo Masini	Individual pursuit	C1	4:14.79	7

Women

Athlete	Event	Class	Time	Rank
Jenny Narcisi	Time trial	500m C4-5	45.421	14
Jenny Narcisi	Individual pursuit	C4	4:19.968	8

== Equestrian ==
The country qualified to participate in the team event at the Rio Games.

Italy fielded a squad of four riders to compete.

Athlete	Horse	Grade	Dressage individual Test		Dressage freestyle Test		Dressage team test	
Athlete	Horse	Grade	Points	Rank	Points	Rank	Points	Rank
Sara Morganti	Royal Delight	Ia	DNS		Did not advance		WD	—N/a
Luigi Ferdinando Acerbi	Quasimodo di Sanpatrignano	Ia	67.826	15	Did not advance		70.000	—N/a
Francesca Salvadé	Muggel 4	II	69.147	9	Did not advance		69.147	—N/a
Silvia Veratti	Zadok	II	69.353	6	Did not advance		69.353	—N/a
Luigi Ferdinando Acerbi; Sara Morganti; Francesca Salvadé; Silvia Veratti	See above	Team	—N/a				208.500	9

== Paracanoeing ==
Italy earned a qualifying spot at the 2016 Summer Paralympics in this sport following their performance at the 2015 ICF Canoe Sprint & Paracanoe World Championships in Milan, Italy where the top six finishers in each Paralympic event earned a qualifying spot for their nation. Salvatore Ravalli earned the spot for Italy after finishing sixth in the men's KL1 event. Federico Mancarella earned another spot for Italy after finishing fourth in the men's KL2 event. Veronica Yoko Plebani earned a third spot for Italy after finishing fifthin the women's KL3 event.

Athlete	Event	Heats		Semifinals		Final	
Athlete	Event	Time	Rank	Time	Rank	Time	Rank
Salvatore Ravalli	Men's KL1	01:16.28	5 SF	01:07.65	5	Did not advance	
Federico Mancarella	Men's KL2	47.300	3 SF	47.408	1 F	45.596	5
Veronica Yoko Plebani	Women's KL3	55.466	2 F	—N/a		52.802	6

Qualification Legend: SF = Qualify to semifinal; FA = Qualify to final (medal); FB = Qualify to final B (non-medal); F=Qualify to final

== Paratriathlon ==
Athlete	Event	Time	Rank
Giovanni Achenza	Men's PT1	1:01:45	3rd place, bronze medalist(s)
Michele Ferrarin	Men's PT2	1:12:30	2nd place, silver medalist(s)
Giovanni Sasso	Men's PT2	1:19:17	9

== Rowing ==
One pathway for qualifying for Rio involved having a boat have top eight finish at the 2015 FISA World Rowing Championships in a medal event. Italy qualified for the 2016 Games under this criterion in the AS Men's Single Sculls event with an eighth-place finish in a time of 04:58.860. Italy qualified a second boat in the AS Women's Single Sculls event with a sixth-place finish in a time of 05:50.920. Italy qualified a third boat with a fourth-place finish in the LTA Mixed Coxed Four event in a time of 03:30.980, eleven seconds behind first-place finisher, Great Britain, who had a time of 03:19.560.

Athlete	Event	Heats		Repechage		Final	
Athlete	Event	Time	Rank	Time	Rank	Time	Rank
Fabrizio Caselli	Men's single sculls	5:10.02	3 R	5:08.96	4 FB	5:06.37	8
Eleonora de Paolis	Women's single sculls	5:50.99	5 R	5:58.65	4 FB	5:54.13	9
Valentina Grassi; Tommaso Schettino; Luca Lunghi; Florinda Trombetta; Giuseppe Di Capua	Mixed coxed four	3:37.37	5 R	3:42.45	4 FB	3:35.76	10

Qualification Legend: FA=Final A (medal); FB=Final B (non-medal); R=Repechage

== Sailing ==
Italy qualified a boat for one of the three sailing classes at the Games through their results at the 2014 Disabled Sailing World Championships held in Halifax, Nova Scotia, Canada. A crew qualified for the two-person SKUD-18 class.

An alternative pathway for qualifying for Rio involved having a boat have top seven finish at the 2015 Combined World Championships in a medal event where the country had nor already qualified through via the 2014 IFDS Sailing World Championships. Italy qualified for the 2016 Games under this criterion in the Sonar event with a fourteenth-place finish overall and the sixth country who had not qualified via the 2014 Championships. Italy qualified a second under this criterion in the 2.4m event with a tenth-place finish overall and the second country who had not qualified via the 2014 Championships. The boat was crewed by Antonio Squizzato.

Athlete	Event	Race											Net points	Final rank
Athlete	Event	1	2	3	4	5	6	7	8	9	10	11	Net points	Final rank
Antonio Squizzato	Norlin Mark 3 / 2.4 Metre	10	6	9	7	4	9	6	5	6	10	~~11~~	72	7
Marco Gualandris; Marta Zanetti	Skud 18	2	4	7	7	DSQ; ~~12~~	DNF; 12	4	9	3	3	5	56	6
Gianluca Raggi; Fabrizio Solazzo; Gian Bachisio Pira	Sonar	~~14~~	13	11	13	12	13	7	12	9	6	13	109	12

== Shooting ==
The country sent shooters to 2015 IPC IPC Shooting World Cup in Osijek, Croatia, where Rio direct qualification was available. They earned a qualifying spot at this event based on the performance of Nadia Fario in the P4 – 50m Pistol Mixed SH1 event.

The third opportunity for direct qualification for shooters to the Rio Paralympics took place at the 2015 IPC IPC Shooting World Cup in Sydney, Australia. At this competition, Massimo Croci earned a qualifying spot for their country in the R3 - Mixed 10m Air Rifle Prone SH1 event.

The last direct qualifying event for Rio in shooting took place at the 2015 IPC Shooting World Cup in Fort Benning in November. Pamela Novaglio earned a qualifying spot for their country at this competition in the R5 Mixed 10m Air Rifle Prone SH2 event.

Athlete	Event	Qualification		Final	
Athlete	Event	Score	Rank	Score	Rank
Massimo Croci	Mixed 10 M air rifle prone SH1	631.7	12	Did not advance	
Nadia Fario	Women's 10m air pistol SH1	360.0	12	Did not advance	
Nadia Fario	Mixed 50 M pistol SH1	522.0	13	Did not advance	
Pamela Novaglio	Mixed 10 M air rifle prone SH2	627.5	27	Did not advance	

== Swimming ==
The top two finishers in each Rio medal event at the 2015 IPC Swimming World Championships earned a qualifying spot for their country for Rio. Francesco Bocciardo earned Italy a spot after winning gold in the Men's 400m Freestyle S6.

Men

Athlete	Event	Heats		Final	
Athlete	Event	Result	Rank	Result	Rank
Vincenzo Boni	50 metre freestyle S3	47.03	4 Q	47.32	5
Vincenzo Boni	100 metre freestyle S4	1:39.66	10	Did not advance	
Vincenzo Boni	50 metre backstroke S3	47.16	2 Q	46.67	3rd place, bronze medalist(s)
Vincenzo Boni	200 metre freestyle S3	—N/a		3:30.02	4
Giovanni Sciaccaluga	50 metre freestyle S5	36.35	7 Q	36.85	8
Giovanni Sciaccaluga	100 metre freestyle S5	1:22.45	9	Did not advance	
Giovanni Sciaccaluga	200 metre freestyle S5	2:54.48	7 Q	2:51.63	7
Marco Maria Dolfin	50 metre freestyle S6	36.05	21	Did not advance	
Marco Maria Dolfin	100 metre breaststroke SB5	1:40.00	5 Q	1:38.27	4
Marco Maria Dolfin	200 metre individual medley SM6	3:23.30	12	Did not advance	
Francesco Bocciardo	50 metre freestyle S6	33.16	13	Did not advance	
Francesco Bocciardo	100 metre freestyle S6	1:09.63	7 Q	1:09.64	8
Francesco Bocciardo	400 metre freestyle S6	5:18.61	2 Q	5:02.15	1st place, gold medalist(s)
Riccardo Menciotti	50 metre freestyle S10	25.77	13	Did not advance	
Riccardo Menciotti	100 metre freestyle S10	56.77	14	Did not advance	
Riccardo Menciotti	400 metre freestyle S10	4:30.27	15	Did not advance	
Riccardo Menciotti	100 metre backstroke S10	1:02.63	8 Q	1:02.70	8
Riccardo Menciotti	100 metre butterfly S10	59.33	7 Q	59.65	7
Fabrizio Sottile	50 metre freestyle S12	25.95	14	Did not advance	
Fabrizio Sottile	100 metre backstroke S12	1:08.93	10	Did not advance	
Fabrizio Sottile	100 metre breaststroke SB12	1:13.60	8 Q	1:13.92	8
Valerio Taras	100 metre freestyle S7	1:08.64	10	Did not advance	
Valerio Taras	400 metre freestyle S7	5:17.42	9	Did not advance	
Valerio Taras	50 metre butterfly S7	34.17	11	Did not advance	
Valerio Taras	200 metre individual medley SM7	2:48.98	6 Q	2:47.27	7
Federico Morlacchi	100 metre freestyle S9	57.75	6 Q	57.28	4
Federico Morlacchi	400 metre freestyle S9	4:22.20	2 Q	4:17.91	2nd place, silver medalist(s)
Federico Morlacchi	100 metre breaststroke SB8	—N/a		1:12.68	2nd place, silver medalist(s)
Federico Morlacchi	100 metre butterfly S9	1:01.57	2 Q	59.52	2nd place, silver medalist(s)
Federico Morlacchi	200 metre individual medley SM9	2:20.15	3 Q	2:16.72	1st place, gold medalist(s)
Francesco Bettella	50 metre backstroke S1	—N/a		1:12.49	2nd place, silver medalist(s)
Francesco Bettella	100 metre backstroke S1	—N/a		2:27.06	2nd place, silver medalist(s)
Efrem Morelli	50 metre backstroke S4	49.75	8 Q	52.54	8
Efrem Morelli	50 metre breaststroke SB3	49.88	4 Q	49.92	3rd place, bronze medalist(s)
Efrem Morelli	150 metre individual medley SM4	2:41.32	4 Q	2:43.75	5
Andrea Massussi	50 metre backstroke S5	43.82	8 Q	42.22	7
Andrea Massussi	100 metre breaststroke SB4	—N/a		1:51.96	7
Andrea Massussi	50 metre butterfly S5	48.21	14	Did not advance	

Women

Athlete	Event	Heats		Final	
Athlete	Event	Result	Rank	Result	Rank
Arjola Trimi	50 metre freestyle S4	42.60	4 Q	40.51	2nd place, silver medalist(s)
Arjola Trimi	50 metre backstroke S4	57.09	7 Q	54.03	5
Arjola Trimi	50 metre breaststroke SB3	1:06.55	5 Q	1:07.69	6
Arjola Trimi	150 metre individual medley SM4	3:02.37	5 Q	2:57.91	5
Emanuela Romano	50 metre freestyle S6	37.04	8 Q	36.62	8
Emanuela Romano	100 metre freestyle S6	1:20.15	7 Q	1:18.34	7
Emanuela Romano	400 metre freestyle S6	5:58.53	8 Q	5:51.05	7
Emanuela Romano	100 metre backstroke S6	1:32.42	6 Q	1:32.45	5
Emanuela Romano	100 metre breaststroke SB5	1:50.90	6 Q	1:52.33	7
Francesca Secci	50 metre freestyle S9	31.94	18	Did not advance	
Francesca Secci	100 metre freestyle S9	1:09.95	19	Did not advance	
Francesca Secci	400 metre freestyle S9	5:11.18	12	Did not advance	
Francesca Secci	100 metre backstroke S9	DSQ		Did not advance	
Francesca Secci	100 metre butterfly S9	1:14.64	12	Did not advance	
Francesca Secci	200 metre individual medley SM9	2:50.91	18	Did not advance	
Cecilia Camellini	50 metre freestyle S11	31.52	5 Q	31.71	5
Cecilia Camellini	100 metre freestyle S11	1:09.10	2 Q	1:10.39	5
Cecilia Camellini	400 metre freestyle S11	5:19.17	1 Q	5:16.36	2nd place, silver medalist(s)
Cecilia Camellini	100 metre backstroke S11	1:22.01	4 Q	1:23.12	7
Martina Rabbolini	50 metre freestyle S11	34.88	11	Did not advance	
Martina Rabbolini	100 metre freestyle S11	1:18.50	13	Did not advance	
Martina Rabbolini	400 metre freestyle S11	5:51.70	11	Did not advance	
Martina Rabbolini	100 metre backstroke S11	1:30.28	12	Did not advance	
Martina Rabbolini	100 metre breaststroke SB11	—N/a		1:38.81	7
Martina Rabbolini	200 metre individual medley SM11	3:15.67	11	Did not advance	
Alessia Berra	50 metre freestyle S13	28.85	7 Q	29.01	8
Alessia Berra	100 metre freestyle S13	1:02.29	7 Q	1:02.16	7
Alessia Berra	400 metre freestyle S13	4:46.39	4 Q	4:44.52	5
Alessia Berra	100 metre butterfly S13	1:07.39	5 Q	1:08.24	6
Alessia Berra	200 metre individual medley SM13	2:36.39	6 Q	2:37.91	7
Xenia Francesca Palazzo	200 metre freestyle S14	2:21.25	8 Q	2:19.21	6
Xenia Francesca Palazzo	100 metre backstroke S14	1:18.26	8 Q	1:17.64	8
Xenia Francesca Palazzo	100 metre breaststroke SB14	1:29.72	11	Did not advance	
Xenia Francesca Palazzo	200 metre individual medley SM14	2:48.04	10	Did not advance	
Arianna Talamona	400 metre freestyle S7	—N/a		5:48.37	7
Arianna Talamona	100 metre backstroke S7	1:33.46	12	Did not advance	
Arianna Talamona	100 metre breaststroke SB6	1:52.14	10	Did not advance	
Arianna Talamona	200 metre individual medley SM7	3:18.06	6 Q	3:16.97	6
Gloria Boccanera	50 metre backstroke S2	—N/a		1:22.80	4
Gloria Boccanera	100 metre backstroke S2	—N/a		3:18.38	6
Giulia Ghiretti	50 metre backstroke S5	54.68	10	Did not advance	
Giulia Ghiretti	100 metre breaststroke SB4	1:55.58	3 Q	1:50.58	2nd place, silver medalist(s)
Giulia Ghiretti	50 metre butterfly S5	48.33	4 Q	45.74	3rd place, bronze medalist(s)

== Table tennis ==
Men

Athlete	Event	Group Stage				Round 1	Quarterfinals	Semifinals	Final	
Athlete	Event	Opposition Result	Opposition Result	Opposition Result	Rank	Opposition Result	Opposition Result	Opposition Result	Opposition Result	Rank
Andrea Borgato	Individual C1	Davies (GBR); L 2-3	Keller (SUI); W 3-1	—N/a	2	—N/a	Lee (KOR); L 0-3	Did not advance		
Giuseppe Vella	Individual C2	Yezyk (UKR); L 0-3	Suchánek (CZE); L 1-3	—N/a	3	Did not advance				
Raimondo Alecci	Individual C6	Rosenmeier (DEN); L 0-3	Alcaraz (ESP); L 2-3	—N/a	3	Did not advance				
Mohamed Amine Kalem	Individual C9	Zhao (CHN); W 3-2	Moreira (BRA); L 2-3	—N/a	2	Shchepansky (UKR); W 3-0	Ma (CHN); W 3-2	Last (NED); L 1-3	Gonzales (ESP); W 3-0	3rd place, bronze medalist(s)
Andrea Borgato; Giuseppe Vella	Team C1-2	—N/a					South Korea (KOR); L 0-2	Did not advance		
Raimondo Alecci; Mohamed Amine Kalem	Team C9-10	—N/a				Great Britain (GBR); L 0-2	Did not advance			

Women

Athlete	Event	Group Stage				Round 1	Quarterfinals	Semifinals	Final	
Athlete	Event	Opposition Result	Opposition Result	Opposition Result	Rank	Opposition Result	Opposition Result	Opposition Result	Opposition Result	Rank
Giada Rossi	Individual C1-2	Brill (ISR); W 3-0	Bootwansirina (THA); W 3-1	—N/a	1	—N/a	Buclaw (POL); W 3-2	Seo (KOR); L 0-3	Bootwansirina (THA); W 3-0	3rd place, bronze medalist(s)
Clara Podda	Individual C1-2	Seo (KOR); L 0-3	Oliveira (BRA); W 3-2	—N/a	2	—N/a	Liu (CHN); L 0-3	Did not advance		
Michela Brunelli	Individual C3	Muzinic (CRO); W 3-2	Kim (KOR); W 3-1	—N/a	1	—N/a	Yoon (KOR); L 0-3	Did not advance		
Giada Rossi; Clara Podda; Michela Brunelli	Team C1-3	—N/a					Great Britain (GBR); W 2-1	China (CHN); L 0-2	South Korea (KOR); L 1-2	4

== Wheelchair fencing ==
Italy will send eight wheelchair fencers to the Rio Paralympics.

Men

Athlete	Event		Pools	Round of 16	Quarterfinal	Semifinal	Final / BM	
Athlete	Event		Rank	Opposition Score	Opposition Score	Opposition Score	Opposition Score	Rank
Matteo Betti	Men's épée	Category A	6 Q	—N/a	Gilliver (GBR); L 11-15	Did not advance		
Matteo Betti	Men's foil	Category A	6 Q	—N/a	Pender (POL); L 14-15	Did not advance		
Emanuele Lambertini	Men's foil	Category A	8 Q	—N/a	Sun (CHN); L 5-15	Did not advance		
Marco Cima	Men's foil	Category B	2 Q	—N/a	Sarri (ITA); W 15-14	Feng (CHN); L 14-15	Valet (FRA); L 4-15	4
Alessio Sarri	Men's foil	Category B	6 Q	—N/a	Cima (ITA); L 14-15	Did not advance		
Alessio Sarri	Men's sabre	Category B	4 Q	—N/a	Pluta (POL); L 13-15	Did not advance		
Alberto Pellegrini	Men's sabre	Category A	7 Q	—N/a	Tian (CHN); L 5-15	Did not advance		
Matteo Betti; Marco Cima; Emanuele Lambertini	Men's épée	Team	5	—N/a		Did not advance	5th-6th classification Brazil; W 45-38	5
Matteo Betti; Marco Cima; Emanuele Lambertini	Men's foil	Team	5	—N/a		Did not advance	5th-6th classification Brazil; W 45-14	5

Women

Athlete	Event		Pools	Round of 16	Quarterfinal	Semifinal	Final / BM	
Athlete	Event		Rank	Opposition Score	Opposition Score	Opposition Score	Opposition Score	Rank
Loredana Trigilia	Women's foil	Category A	10	—N/a	Did not advance			
Andreea Mogos	Women's foil	Category A	7 Q	—N/a	Rong (CHN); L 7-15	Did not advance		
Beatrice Vio	Women's foil	Category B	1 Q	—N/a	Makowska (POL); W 15-6	Yao (CHN); W 15-1	Zhou (CHN); W 15-7	1st place, gold medalist(s)
Loredana Trigilia; Andreea Mogos; Beatrice Vio	Women's foil	Team	3 Q	—N/a		China; L 37-45	Hong Kong; W 45-44	3rd place, bronze medalist(s)

== Wheelchair tennis ==
Italy qualified one competitors in the men's single event, Fabian Mazzei. Italy qualified one player in the women's singles event, Marianna Lauro. The country also qualified one player in the quad singles event, Alberto Corradi.

Men

Athlete	Event	Round of 64	Round of 32	Round of 16	Quarterfinals	Semifinals	Final / BM	
Athlete	Event	Opposition Score	Opposition Score	Opposition Score	Opposition Score	Opposition Score	Opposition Score	Rank
Fabian Mazzei	Singles	McCarroll (GBR); L 5-7, 3-6	Did not advance					
Alberto Corradi	Quad	—N/a		Lapthorne (GBR); L 2-6, 3-6	Did not advance			

Women

Athlete	Event	Round of 64	Round of 32	Round of 16	Quarterfinals	Semifinals	Final / BM	
Athlete	Event	Opposition Score	Opposition Score	Opposition Score	Opposition Score	Opposition Score	Opposition Score	Rank
Marianna Lauro	Singles	—N/a	Baron (USA); L 1-6, 3-6	Did not advance				

== See also ==
- Italy at the 2016 Summer Olympics
