= Cycling at the 2016 Summer Paralympics – Men's road race C1–3 =

Cycling, Men's road race C1-2-3 at the XV Paralympic Games
- Venue: Pontal, Rio
- Dates: September 17
- Competitors: 40

The men's road race C1-2-3 cycling event at the 2016 Summer Paralympics took place on September 17 at Pontal, Rio. The race distance was 60 km.

== Results : Men's road race C1-2-3 ==
Rank	Name	Nationality	Classification	Time	Deficit
1	Steffen Warias	Germany	C3	01:49:11	0
2	Kris Bosmans	Belgium	C3	s.t.	s.t.
3	Fabio Anobile	Italy	C3	s.t.	s.t.
4	Esneider Munoz Marin	Colombia	C3	s.t.	s.t.
5	Eoghan Clifford	Ireland	C3	01:49:21	10
6	David Nicholas	Australia	C3	01:51:48	02:37:00
7	Henrik Marvig	Sweden	C3	s.t.	s.t.
8	Ivo Koblasa	Czech Republic	C2	s.t.	s.t.
9	Eduardo Santas Ascensio	Spain	C3	s.t.	s.t.
10	Joseph Berenyi	United States	C3	s.t.	s.t.
11	Fraser Sharp	New Zealand	C3	s.t.	s.t.
12	Israel Hilario Rimas	Peru	C2	s.t.	s.t.
13	Masaki Fujita	Japan	C3	s.t.	s.t.
14	Michael Teuber	Germany	C1	01:52:09	02:58:00
15	Tristen Chernove	Canada	C2	01:54:49	05:38:00
16	Maurice Far Eckhard Tio	Spain	C2	01:54:58	05:47:00
17	Yongsik Jin	South Korea	C3	01:55:04	05:53:00
18	Erich Winkler	Germany	C1	s.t.	s.t.
19	Giancarlo Masini	Italy	C1	01:55:20	06:09:00
20	Cirio de Jesus Molina	Venezuela	C2	01:58:19	09:08:00
21	Arnoud Nijhuis	Netherlands	C1	01:58:53	09:42:00
22	Telmo Pinao	Portugal	C2	01:58:55	09:44:00
23	Juan Jose Mendez Fernandez	Spain	C1	01:59:15	10:04:00
24	Colin Lynch	Ireland	C2	02:00:56	11:45:00
25	Glenn Johansen	Norway	C3	s.t.	s.t.
26	Guihua Liang	China	C2	02:01:55	12:44:00
27	Roger Bolliger	Switzerland	C2	02:07:36	18:25:00
28	Craig Ridgard	South Africa	C2	s.t.	s.t.
29	Attila Olah	Romania	C2	02:07:59	18:48:00
30	Rodrigo Lopez	Argentina	C1	02:15:19	26:08:00
31	Shota Kawamoto	Japan	C2	02:26:46	37:35:00
-	Ross Wilson	Canada	C1	DNF	-
-	Victor Garrido Marquez	Venezuela	C2	DNF	-
-	Diederick Schelfhout	Belgium	C3	DNF	-
-	Amador Granados Alkorta	Spain	C3	DNF	-
-	Hao Xie	China	C2	DNF	-
-	Zhangyu Li	China	C1	DNF	-
-	Michael Sametz	Canada	C3	DNF	-
-	Alvaro Galvis Becerra	Colombia	C2	DSQ	-
-	William Lister	United States	C1	DNS	
