= Cycling at the 2016 Summer Paralympics – Men's road time trial H3 =

Cycling, men's road time trial H3 at the XV Paralympic Games
- Venue: Flamengo Park
- Dates: 14 September
- Competitors: 12 from 9 nations

Medalists
1st place, gold medalist(s)		Vittorio Podesta	Italy
2nd place, silver medalist(s)		Walter Ablinger	Austria
3rd place, bronze medalist(s)		Charles Moreau	Canada

The Men's time trial H3 road cycling event at the 2016 Summer Paralympics took place on 14 September at Flamengo Park, Pontal. Twelve riders from nine nations competed.

The H3 category is a handcycle class is for cyclists with lower limb disabilities and neurological dysfunction.

== Results : Men's road time trial H3 ==
Rank	Name	Nationality	Time	Deficit	Avg. Speed
1st place, gold medalist(s)	Vittorio Podesta	Italy	28:19.45	0	42.367
2nd place, silver medalist(s)	Walter Ablinger	Austria	29:26.01	+1:06.56	40.77
3rd place, bronze medalist(s)	Charles Moreau	Canada	29:26.91	+1:07.46	40.749
4	Heinz Frei	Switzerland	29:27.13	+1:07.68	40.744
5	William Lachenauer	United States	29:59.47	+1:40.02	40.012
6	Lukas Weber	Switzerland	30:35.66	+2:16.21	39.223
7	Jean-Francois Deberg	Belgium	30:53.37	+2:33.92	38.848
8	David Franek	France	31:11.16	+2:51.71	38.479
9	Maximilian Weber	Germany	31:20.94	+3:01.49	38.279
10	Jani Peltopuro	Finland	32:32.81	+4:13.36	36.87
11	Declan Slevin	Ireland	32:59.53	+4:40.08	36.372
12	Luciano Fratini	Luxembourg	34:05.77	+5:46.32	35.195
13	Paolo Cecchetto	Italy	34:41.41	+6:21.96	34.592
