= 2017 UCI Para-cycling Road World Championships =

- Venue: Pietermaritzburg, South Africa
- Date: 31 August–3 September 2017
- Nations participating: 38
- Cyclists participating: 277
- Events: 5

The 2017 UCI Para-cycling Road World Championships was the seventh edition of the World Championships for road cycling for athletes with a physical disability. The Championships took place on the roads of Pietermaritzburg in South Africa from 31 August to 3 September 2017.

== Classification ==
Sport class

- Cycling
  - C1 - locomotor disability: Neurological, or amputation
  - C2 - Locomotor disability: Neurological, decrease in muscle strength, or amputation
  - C3 - Locomotor disability: Neurological, or amputation
  - C4 - Locomotor disability: Neurological, or amputation
  - C5 - Locomotor disability: Neurological, or amputation
- Hand cycling
  - H1 - tetraplegics with severe upper limb impairment to the C6 vertebra
  - H2 - Tetraplegics with minor upper limb impairment from C7 through T3
  - H3 - paraplegics with impairment from T4 through T10
  - H4 - Paraplegics with impairment from T11 down, and amputees unable to kneel
  - H5 - Athletes who can kneel on a handcycle, a category that includes paraplegics and amputees
- Tricycle
  - T1 - Severe locomotor dysfunction
  - T2 - Moderate loss of stability and function
- Tandem
  - Tandem B - Visual impairment

== Event winners ==
| Event | Class | Gold | | Silver | | Bronze | |
|---|---|---|---|---|---|---|---|
Men's events
| 15.5 km time trial | H1 | Benjamin Früh; Switzerland | 45:14.14 | Nicolas Pieter du Preez; South Africa | 46:52.67 | Harri Sopanen; Finland | 50:39.42 |
| 15.5 km time trial | H2 | Luca Mazzone; Italy | 29:19.00 | William Groulx; United States | 29:25.63 | Sergio Garrote Munoz; Spain | 31:21.98 |
| 15.5 km time trial | T1 | Sergey Semochkin; Russia | 35:45.68 | Rickard Nilsson; Sweden | 38:09.64 | Leonardo Melle; Italy | 38:56.77 |
| 15.5 km time trial | T2 | Hans-Peter Durst; Germany | 27:41.14 | Ryan Boyle; United States | 27:57.17 | Stephen Hills; New Zealand | 29:21.08 |
| 23.3 km time trial | C1 | Michael Teuber; Germany | 35:29.66 | Ross Wilson; Canada | 35:57.87 | William Lister; United States | 37:02.31 |
| 23.3 km time trial | C2 | Tristen Chernove; Canada | 35:32.72 | Darren Hicks; Australia | 35:49.16 | Israel Hilario Rimas; Peru | 35:50.96 |
| 23.3 km time trial | C3 | Michael Sametz; Canada | 32:48.92 | Benjamin Watson; Great Britain | 33:26.11 | Esneider Muñoz; Colombia | 34:18.19 |
| 23.3 km time trial | H3 | Paolo Cecchetto; Italy | 39:30.59 | Heinz Frei; Switzerland | 39:55.97 | Charles Moreau; Canada | 40:22.98 |
| 23.3 km time trial | H4 | Jetze Plat; Netherlands | 36:39.14 | Rafal Wilk; Poland | 38:27.81 | Krystian Giera; Poland | 39:04.52 |
| 23.3 km time trial | H5 | Alessandro Zanardi; Italy | 37:47.96 | Tim de Vries; Netherlands | 37:50.59 | Luis Costa; Portugal | 38:35.47 |
| 31 km time trial | C4 | Jozef Metelka; Slovakia | 42:11.02 | Kyle Bridgwood; Australia | 42:23.08 | Diego Germán Dueñas; Colombia | 43:46.44 |
| 31 km time trial | C5 | Daniel Abraham Gebru; Netherlands | 41:07.98 | Yegor Dementyev; Ukraine | 41:17.23 | Lauro Cesar Chaman; Brazil | 41:44.23 |
| 31 km time trial | Tandem B | Marcin Polak; Michał Ładosz (pilot); Poland | 39:17.24 | Stephen Bate; Adam Duggleby (pilot); Great Britain | 39:20.93 | Vincent ter Schure; Timo Fransen (pilot); Netherlands | 40:00.59 |
| 30.4 km Road race | H1 | Nicolas Pieter du Preez; South Africa | 1:22:29 | Benjamin Früh; Switzerland | + 00:00:45 | Fabrizio Cornegliani; Italy | + 00:04:26 |
| 30.4 km Road race | T1 | Sergey Semochkin; Russia | 1:10:43 | Leonardo Melle; Italy | -1 LAP | Rickard Nilsson; Sweden | -1 LAP |
| 30.4 km Road race | T2 | Hans-Peter Durst; Germany | 56:51 | Stephen Hills; New Zealand | + 00:02 | Joan Reinoso Figuerola; Spain | + 00:11 |
| 42.5 km Road race | H2 | Luca Mazzone; Italy | 1:20:13 | William Groulx; United States | + 00:01:12 | Sergio Garrote Munoz; Spain | + 00:04:05 |
| 60.7 km Road race | C1 | Pierre Senska; Germany | 1:34:37 | Ricardo Ten Argiles; Spain | s.t. | Michael Teuber; Germany | + 00:00:03 |
| 60.7 km Road race | C2 | Tristen Chernove; Canada | 1:33:47 | Darren Hicks; Australia | s.t. | François Lacroix; France | s.t. |
| 60.7 km Road race | C3 | Henrik Marvig; Sweden | 1:33:46 | Steffen Warias; Germany | s.t. | Fabio Anobile; Italy | s.t. |
| 60.7 km Road race | H3 | David Franek; France | 1:42:19 | Paolo Cecchetto; Italy | s.t. | Heinz Frei; Switzerland | + 00:00:03 |
| 60.7 km Road race | H4 | Jetze Plat; Netherlands | 1:42:47 | Rafal Wilk; Poland | + 00:00:02 | Bernd Jeffré; Germany | + 00:03:13 |
| 60.7 km Road race | H5 | Tim de Vries; Netherlands | 1:50:11 | Alessandro Zanardi; Italy | s.t. | Johan Reekers; Netherlands | s.t. |
| 85.0 km Road race | C4 | Tobias Vetter; Germany | 2:06:47 | Kyle Bridgwood; Australia | s.t. | Sergei Pudov; Russia | s.t. |
| 85.0 km Road race | C5 | Lauro Cesar Chaman; Brazil | 2:04:04 | Wolfgang Eibeck; Germany | + 00:02:12 | Dorian Foulon; France | + 00:02:41 |
| 109.3 km Road race | Tandem B | Nelson Javier Serna; Marlon Pérez Arango(pilot); Colombia | 2:29:45 | Tristan Bangma; Patrick Bos(pilot); Netherlands | + 00:00:27 | Marcin Polak; Michał Ładosz(pilot); Poland | s.t. |
Women's events
| 15.5 km time trial | C2 | Daniela Munévar; Colombia | 27:57.61 | Alyda Norbruis; Netherlands | 28:28.93 | Allison Jones; United States | 28:29.86 |
| 15.5 km time trial | C3 | Keiko Noguchi; Japan | 26:17.23 | Anna Beck; Sweden | 26:20.19 | Denise Schindler; Germany | 26:24.89 |
| 15.5 km time trial | H1 | Emilie Miller; Australia | 1:47:32.51 | | | | |
| 15.5 km time trial | H2 | Carmen Koedood; Netherlands | 51:27.92 | Ciara Staunton; Ireland | 1:10:24.36 | | |
| 15.5 km time trial | H3 | Francesca Porcellato; Italy | 31:16.70 | Renata Kałuża; Poland | 33:14.03 | Anna Oroszova; Slovakia | 33:52.38 |
| 15.5 km time trial | H4 | Christiane Reppe; Germany | 32:08.05 | Sandra Graf; Switzerland | 33:21.34 | Svetlana Moshkovich; Russia | 33:22.44 |
| 15.5 km time trial | H5 | Andrea Eskau; Germany | 27:47.61 | Laura de Vaan; Netherlands | 29:06.63 | Jennette Jansen; Netherlands | 30:09.82 |
| 15.5 km time trial | T1 | Shelley Gautier; Canada | 38:03.35 | Yulia Sibagatova; Russia | 38:08.46 | Toni Mould; South Africa | 1:06:38.81 |
| 15.5 km time trial | T2 | Carol Cooke; Australia | 33:03.98 | Jill Walsh; United States | 33:11.05 | Jana Majunke; Germany | 34:14.85 |
| 23.3 km time trial | C4 | Shawn Morelli; United States | 36:48.39 | Raphaela Eggert; Germany | 40:03.52 | Meg Lemon; Australia | 40:12.06 |
| 23.3 km time trial | C5 | Anna Harkowska; Poland | 36:39.63 | Samantha Bosco; United States | 36:49.97 | Kerstin Brachtendorf; Germany | 36:52.63 |
| 31 km time trial | Tandem B | Katie-George Dunlevy; Eve McCrystal(pilot); Ireland | 45:40.57 | Lora Fachie; Corrine Hall(pilot); Great Britain | 45:46.02 | Iwona Podkościelna; Aleksandra Tecław(pilot); Poland | 47:02.75 |
| 18.2 km Road race | H1 | Emilie Miller; Australia | 1:47:32.51 | | | | |
| 24.3 km Road race | T1 | Shelley Gautier; Canada | 1:01:41 | Toni Mould; South Africa | -1 LAP | | |
| 24.3 km Road race | T2 | Carol Cooke; Australia | 51:07 | Jana Majunke; Germany | + 00:32 | Jill Walsh; United States | + 01:03 |
| 36.4 km Road race | H2 | Carmen Koedood; Netherlands | 1:34:54 | Ciara Staunton; Ireland | -1 LAP | | |
| 42.5 km Road race | H3 | Francesca Porcellato; Italy | 1:24:16 | Anna Oroszova; Slovakia | + 00:05:21 | Renata Kałuża; Poland | + 00:05:43 |
| 42.5 km Road race | H4 | Christiane Reppe; Germany | 1:29:16 | Svetlana Moshkovich; Russia | + 00:00:02 | Sandra Graf; Switzerland | + 00:00:18 |
| 42.5 km Road race | H5 | Andrea Eskau; Germany | 1:18:05 | Laura de Vaan; Netherlands | + 00:06:04 | Jennette Jansen; Netherlands | s.t. |
| 48.6 km Road race | C2 | Allison Jones; United States | 1:30:44 | Daniela Munévar; Colombia | + 00:00:03 | Alyda Norbruis; Netherlands | + 00:05:23 |
| 48.6 km Road race | C3 | Anna Beck; Sweden | 1:31:33 | Denise Schindler; Germany | s.t. | Keiko Noguchi; Japan | s.t. |
| 60.7 km Road race | C4 | Shawn Morelli; United States | 1:42:15 | Jenny Narcisi; Italy | + 00:03:34 | Meg Lemon; Australia | + 00:04:21 |
| 60.7 km Road race | C5 | Kerstin Brachtendorf; Germany | 1:41:58 | Mariela Delgado; Argentina | s.t. | Crystal Lane; Great Britain | s.t. |
| 85 km Road race | Tandem B | Katie-George Dunlevy; Eve McCrystal(pilot); Ireland | 2:05:54 | Iwona Podkościelna; Aleksandra Tecław(pilot); Poland | s.t. | Eleni Kalatzi; Argyro Milaki(pilot); Greece | s.t. |
Mixed events
| Team Relay | H1-5 | Paolo Cecchetto; Luca Mazzone; Alessandro Zanardi; Italy | 16:31 | Matthew Updike; William Groulx; Alfredo de los Santos; United States | + 00:00:06 | Bernd Jeffré; Mariusz Frankowski; Andrea Eskau; Germany | + 00:00:51 |

== Medal table ==
| Rank | Nation | Gold | Silver | Bronze | Total |
|---|---|---|---|---|---|
| 1 | Germany (GER) | 10 | 5 | 6 | 21 |
| 2 | Italy (ITA) | 7 | 4 | 4 | 15 |
| 3 | Netherlands (NED) | 6 | 5 | 5 | 16 |
| 4 | Canada (CAN) | 5 | 1 | 1 | 7 |
| 5 | Australia (AUS) | 4 | 4 | 2 | 10 |
| 6 | United States (USA) | 3 | 6 | 3 | 12 |
| 7 | Poland (POL) | 2 | 4 | 4 | 10 |
| 8 | Russia (RUS) | 2 | 2 | 2 | 6 |
| 9 | Sweden (SWE) | 2 | 2 | 1 | 5 |
| 10 | Ireland (IRL) | 2 | 2 | 0 | 4 |
| 11 | Colombia (COL) | 2 | 1 | 2 | 5 |
| 12 | Switzerland (SUI) | 1 | 3 | 2 | 6 |
| 13 | South Africa (RSA) | 1 | 2 | 1 | 4 |
| 14 | Slovakia (SVK) | 1 | 1 | 1 | 3 |
| 15 | France (FRA) | 1 | 0 | 2 | 3 |
| 16 | Brazil (BRA) | 1 | 0 | 1 | 2 |
| 16 | Japan (JPN) | 1 | 0 | 1 | 2 |
| 18 | Great Britain (GBR) | 0 | 3 | 1 | 4 |
| 19 | Spain (ESP) | 0 | 1 | 3 | 4 |
| 20 | New Zealand (NZL) | 0 | 1 | 1 | 2 |
| 21 | Argentina (ARG) | 0 | 1 | 0 | 1 |
| 21 | Ukraine (UKR) | 0 | 1 | 0 | 1 |
| 23 | Finland (FIN) | 0 | 0 | 1 | 1 |
| 23 | Peru (PER) | 0 | 0 | 1 | 1 |
| 23 | Portugal (POR) | 0 | 0 | 1 | 1 |
| Totals (25 entries) | | 51 | 49 | 46 | 146 |

== Participating nations ==
38 nations participated.

- Argentina
- Australia
- Austria
- Belgium
- Brazil
- Burkina Faso
- Canada
- Colombia
- Costa Rica
- Czech Republic
- Denmark
- Dominican Republic
- Spain
- Estonia
- Finland
- France
- Great Britain
- Germany
- Greece
- India
- Ireland
- Italy
- Japan
- Lebanon
- Malaysia
- Netherlands
- New Zealand
- Peru
- Poland
- Portugal
- South Africa
- Russia
- Switzerland
- Slovakia
- Sweden
- Ukraine
- United States
- Venezuela
