= Cycling at the 2016 Summer Paralympics – Men's road time trial H2 =

Cycling, Men's road time trial H2 at the XV Paralympic Games
- Venue: Flamengo Park
- Dates: 14 September
- Competitors: 9 from 8 nations

Medalists
1st place, gold medalist(s)		Luca Mazzone	Italy
2nd place, silver medalist(s)		William Groulx	United States
3rd place, bronze medalist(s)		Brian Sheridan	United States

The Men's time trial H2 road cycling event at the 2016 Summer Paralympics took place on 14 September at Flamengo Park, Pontal. Eight riders from seven nations competed.

H or handcycle classifications are for cyclists using handcycles rather than standard bicycles, because of lower limb dysfunction or amputation.

The H2 category is specifically for athletes with tetraplegia C7/C8 and severe athetosis/ataxia/dystonia, and tetraplegics with impairments corresponding to a complete cervical lesion at C7/C8 or above. This classification is marked by complete loss of trunk stability and lower limb function, and spinal cord injury. The H2 time trial features athletes with the most severe impairments in the H class.

Former Paralympic swimmer, and eight time World champion, Italy's Luca Mazzone took the gold medal, 6 seconds ahead of rival William Groulx of the United States, the first of three medals Mazzone would win (the others coming in the H2 road race and the Mixed team relay).

== Results : Men's road time trial H2 ==
Rank	Name	Nationality	Time	Deficit	Avg. Speed
1st place, gold medalist(s)	Luca Mazzone	Italy	32:07.09	0	37.362
2nd place, silver medalist(s)	William Groulx	United States	32:13.12	+0:06.03	37.245
3rd place, bronze medalist(s)	Brian Sheridan	United States	33:39.74	+1:32.65	35.648
4	Anders Backman	Sweden	36:04.26	+3:57.17	33.268
5	Christophe Hindricq	Belgium	36:30.00	+4:22.91	32.877
6	Yaakov Kobi Lion	Israel	36:50.45	+4:43.36	32.573
7	Wolfgang Schattauer	Austria	37:56.39	+5:49.30	31.629
-	Tobias Fankhauser	Switzerland	-	-	DNF
