= Cycling at the 2016 Summer Paralympics – Men's road race H3 =

Cycling, Men's road race H3 at the XV Paralympic Games
- Venue: Pontal, Rio
- Dates: September 17
- Competitors: 13

Medalists
1st place, gold medalist(s)		Paolo Cecchetto	Italy
2nd place, silver medalist(s)		Max Weber	Germany
3rd place, bronze medalist(s)		Charles Moreau	Canada

The men's road race H3 cycling event at the 2016 Summer Paralympics took place on September 17 at Pontal, Rio. Thirteen riders competed. The race distance was 60 km.

== Results : Men's road race H3 ==
Rank	Name	Nationality	Classification	Time	Deficit
1st place, gold medalist(s)	Paolo Cecchetto	Italy	H3	01:33:17	0
2nd place, silver medalist(s)	Max Weber	Germany	H3	s.t.	s.t.
3rd place, bronze medalist(s)	Charles Moreau	Canada	H3	s.t.	s.t.
4	Jean-Francois Deberg	Belgium	H3	s.t.	s.t.
5	David Franek	France	H3	s.t.	s.t.
6	Vittorio Podesta	Italy	H3	s.t.	s.t.
7	Heinz Frei	Switzerland	H3	01:34:29	01:12:00
8	Jani Peltopuro	Finland	H3	01:39:25	06:08:00
9	Declan Slevin	Ireland	H3	01:44:30	11:13:00
10	Luciano Fratini	Luxembourg	H3	01:52:52	19:35:00
11	Walter Ablinger	Austria	H3	01:53:29	20:12:00
12	William Lachenauer	United States	H3	s.t.	s.t.
-	Lukas Weber	Switzerland	H3	DNF	-
