= Cycling at the 2016 Summer Paralympics – Women's road race =

The Women's road race cycling events at the 2016 Summer Paralympics took place on September 17 at Flamengo Park, Pontal. Six events were held, over 13 classifications.

== Classification ==
Cyclists are given a classification depending on the type and extent of their disability. The classification system allows cyclists to compete against others with a similar level of function. The class number indicates the severity of impairment with "1" being most impaired.

Cycling classes are:

- B: Blind and visually impaired cyclists use a Tandem bicycle with a sighted pilot on the front
- H 1–4: Cyclists with an impairment that affects their legs use a handcycle
- T 1–2: Cyclists with an impairment that affects their balance use a tricycle
- C 1-5: Cyclists with an impairment that affects their legs, arms and/or trunk but are capable of using a standard bicycle

== Women's road races ==
=== B ===
| Class | Gold | Silver | Bronze |
|---|---|---|---|
| B | Iwona Podkoscielna; Poland | Katie George Dunlevy; Ireland | Emma Foy; New Zealand |

=== H1-4 ===
| Class | Gold | Silver | Bronze |
|---|---|---|---|
| H1-4 | Christiane Reppe; Germany | Lee Do-yeon; South Korea | Francesca Porcellato; Italy |

=== H5 ===
| Class | Gold | Silver | Bronze |
|---|---|---|---|
| H5 | Andrea Eskau; Germany | Laura de Vaan; Netherlands | Jennette Jansen; Netherlands |

=== C1-3 ===
| Class | Gold | Silver | Bronze |
|---|---|---|---|
| C1-3 | Jamie Whitmore; United States | Zeng Sini; China | Denise Schindler; Germany |

=== C4-5 ===
| Class | Gold | Silver | Bronze |
|---|---|---|---|
| C4-5 | Sarah Storey; Great Britain | Anna Harkowska; Poland | Crystal Lane; Great Britain |

=== T1-2 ===
| Class | Gold | Silver | Bronze |
|---|---|---|---|
| T1–2 | Carol Cooke; Australia | Jill Walsh; United States | Jana Majunke; Germany |
