= Cycling at the 2016 Summer Paralympics – Women's road time trial =

The Women's road time trial cycling events at the 2016 Summer Paralympics took place on September 17 at Flamengo Park, Pontal. Seven events took place over thirteen classifications. Four of these events, spanning multiple classifications were 'factored' events, with final times adjusted in line with classification to ensure fairness.

== Classification ==
Cyclists are given a classification depending on the type and extent of their disability. The classification system allows cyclists to compete against others with a similar level of function. The class number indicates the severity of impairment with "1" being most impaired.

Cycling classes are:

- B: Blind and visually impaired cyclists use a Tandem bicycle with a sighted pilot on the front
- H 1–4: Cyclists with an impairment that affects their legs use a handcycle
- T 1–2: Cyclists with an impairment that affects their balance use a tricycle
- C 1-5: Cyclists with an impairment that affects their legs, arms and/or trunk but are capable of using a standard bicycle

== Women's time trials ==
=== B ===
Class	Gold	Silver	Bronze
B	Katie George Dunlevy; Ireland	Yurie Kanuma; Japan	Lora Turnham; Great Britain

=== H1-3 ===
Class	Gold	Silver	Bronze
H1–3	Karen Darke; Great Britain	Alicia Dana; United States	Francesca Porcellato; Italy

=== H4-5 ===
Class	Gold	Silver	Bronze
H4–5	Dorothee Vieth; Germany	Andrea Eskau; Germany	Laura de Vaan; Netherlands

=== C1-3 ===
Class	Gold	Silver	Bronze
C1–3	Alyda Norbruis; Netherlands	Denise Schindler; Germany	Zeng Sini; China

=== C4 ===
Class	Gold	Silver	Bronze
C4	Shawn Morelli; United States	Megan Fisher; United States	Susan Powell; Australia

=== C5 ===
Class	Gold	Silver	Bronze
C5	Sarah Storey; Great Britain	Anna Harkowska; Poland	Samantha Bosco; United States

=== T1-2 ===
Class	Gold	Silver	Bronze
T1–2	Carol Cooke; Australia	Jill Walsh; United States	Shelley Gautier; Canada
