= Cycling at the 2016 Summer Paralympics – Men's road time trial C5 =

Cycling, Men's road time trial C5 at the XV Paralympic Games
- Venue: Flamengo Park
- Dates: 14 September
- Competitors: 14 from 12 nations

Medalists
1st place, gold medalist(s)		Yegor Dementyev	Ukraine
2nd place, silver medalist(s)		Alistair Donohoe	Australia
3rd place, bronze medalist(s)		Lauro Cesar Chaman	Brazil

The Men's time trial C5 road cycling event at the 2016 Summer Paralympics took place on 14 September at Flamengo Park, Pontal. Fourteen riders from twelve nations competed.

The C5 category is for cyclists with least impairment, including single amputation and minimal neurological dysfunction.

== Results ==
Rank	Name	Nationality	Time
1st place, gold medalist(s)	Yegor Dementyev	Ukraine	36:53.23
2nd place, silver medalist(s)	Alistair Donohoe	Australia	37:33.36
3rd place, bronze medalist(s)	Lauro César Chaman	Brazil	37:37.43
4	Daniel Abraham Gebru	Netherlands	37:57.05
5	Andrea Tarlao	Italy	38:14.59
6	Wolfgang Eibeck	Austria	38:15.05
7	Liu Xinyang	China	39:55.90
8	Tomáš Kajnar	Czech Republic	40:16.57
9	Soelito Gohr	Brazil	40:49.70
10	Christopher Murphy	United States	40:52.63
11	Pierpaolo Addesi	Italy	41:28.36
12	Edwin Fabian Matiz Ruiz	Colombia	41:49.94
13	José Frank Rodríguez	Dominican Republic	42:44.57
14	Dane Wilson	South Africa	44:17.59
