= Cycling at the 2016 Summer Paralympics – Men's road race H2 =

Cycling, Men's road race H2 at the XV Paralympic Games
- Venue: Pontal, Rio de Janeiro
- Dates: September 17
- Competitors: 8 from 7 nations

Medalists
1st place, gold medalist(s)		William Groulx	United States
2nd place, silver medalist(s)		Luca Mazzone	Italy
3rd place, bronze medalist(s)		Tobias Fankhauser	Switzerland

The Men's road race H2 cycling event at the 2016 Summer Paralympics took place on September 7 at Pontal, Rio de Janeiro. Eight riders from seven different nations competed. The race distance was 56 km.

== Results ==
Rank	Name	Country	Category	Time	Deficit
1st place, gold medalist(s)	William Groulx	United States	H2	01:15:23	0
2nd place, silver medalist(s)	Luca Mazzone	Italy	H2	s.t	s.t.
3rd place, bronze medalist(s)	Tobias Fankhauser	Switzerland	H2	01:23:12	+07:49
4	Anders Backman	Sweden	H2	01:23:14	+07:51
5	Christophe Hindricq	Belgium	H2	s.t	s.t.
6	Brian Sheridan	United States	H2	01:23:47	+08:24
7	Wolfgang Schattauer	Austria	H2	01:31:39	+16:16
8	Yaakov Kobi Lion	Israel	H2	01:45:24	+30:01
