= Cycling at the 2016 Summer Paralympics – Men's road time trial C1 =

Cycling, Men's road time trial C1 at the XV Paralympic Games
- Venue: Flamengo Park
- Dates: 14 September
- Competitors: 9 from 8 nations

Medalists
1st place, gold medalist(s)		Michael Teuber	Germany
2nd place, silver medalist(s)		Ross Wilson	Canada
3rd place, bronze medalist(s)		Giancarlo Masinia	Italy

The Men's time trial C1 road cycling event at the 2016 Summer Paralympics took place on 14 September at Flamengo Park, Pontal. Nine riders from eight nations competed.

The C1 category is for cyclists with upper or lower limb disabilities and most severe neurological dysfunction.

== Results ==
Rank	Name	Nationality	Time
1st place, gold medalist(s)	Michael Teuber	Germany	27:53.98
2nd place, silver medalist(s)	Ross Wilson	Canada	28:47.34
3rd place, bronze medalist(s)	Giancarlo Masini	Italy	28:47.83
4	Erich Winkler	Germany	29:37.37
5	William Lister	United States	29:49.23
6	Li Zhangyu	China	30:00.77
7	Juan José Méndez Fernández	Spain	30:05.23
8	Rodrigo López	Argentina	31:43.42
9	Arnoud Nijhuis	Netherlands	32:54.22
