= Cycling at the 2016 Summer Paralympics – Women's road race C4–5 =

Cycling, Women's road race C4-5 at the XV Paralympic Games
- Venue: Pontal, Rio
- Dates: September 17

The women's road race C4-5 cycling event at the 2016 Summer Paralympics took place on September 17 at Pontal, Rio. The race distance was 60 km.

== Results ==
Rank	Name	Nationality	Classification	Time	Deficit
1st place, gold medalist(s)	Sarah Storey	Great Britain	C5	02:15:42	-
2nd place, silver medalist(s)	Anna Harkowska	Poland	C5	02:19:11	+03:29
3rd place, bronze medalist(s)	Crystal Lane	Great Britain	C5	02:21:58	+06:16
4	Mariela Delgado	Argentina	C5	s.t.	s.t.
5	Kerstin Brachtendorf	Germany	C5	s.t.	s.t
6	Samantha Bosco	United States	C5	02:22:06	+06:24
7	Alexandra Lisney	Australia	C4	02:22:56	07:14:00
8	Jennifer Schuble	United States	C5	02:24:03	08:21:00
9	Susan Powell	Australia	C4	02:25:50	10:08:00
10	Shawn Morelli	United States	C4	02:25:53	10:11:00
11	Jianping Ruan	China	C4	02:28:54	13:12:00
12	Megan Fisher	United States	C4	02:28:56	13:14:00
13	Jenny Narcisi	Italy	C4		
14	Katell Alençon	France	C4	02:29:04	13:22:00
15	Mari-Liis Juul	Estonia	C5	02:35:02	19:20:00
16	Marie-Claude Molnar	Canada	C4	02:37:49	22:07:00
	Nicole Clermont	Canada	C5	DNF	
	Jufang Zhou	China	C5	DNF	
	Kadeena Cox	Great Britain	C4	DNS	
