= Cycling at the 2016 Summer Paralympics – Men's road race C4–5 =

Cycling, Men's road race C4-5 at the XV Paralympic Games
- Venue: Pontal, Rio
- Dates: September 17
- Competitors: 30 from 20 nations

Medalists
1st place, gold medalist(s)		Daniel Abraham	Netherlands
2nd place, silver medalist(s)		Lauro Chaman	Brazil
3rd place, bronze medalist(s)		Andrea Tarlao	Italy

The men's road race C4-5 cycling event at the 2016 Summer Paralympics took place on September 17 at Pontal, Rio. The race distance was 60 km.

== Death of Bahman Golbarnezhad ==
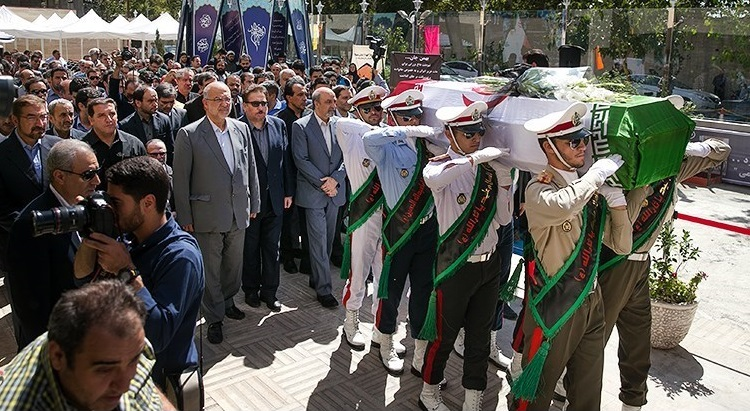
Funeral of Golbarnezhad in Tehran, 22 September 2016

During this race, the Iranian cyclist, Bahman Golbarnezhad suffered a head injury during a collision with a rock on a mountainous stretch of the circuit in Pontal Beach. Golbarnezhad was treated on-site, and was in the process of being transported to the athletes' hospital when he died from a cardiac arrest. The Union Cycliste Internationale (UCI) announced that it would investigate the incident, and the I. R. Iran National Paralympic Committee requested a report on the incident from the IPC. Golbarnezhad's death marked the first time since the 1960 Summer Olympics that an Olympic or Paralympic athlete had died during competition.

Following the incident, the flag of Iran was lowered to half-mast in the Paralympic Village, and for the Iranian sitting volleyball victory against Bosnia and Herzegovina. A period of silence was also held during the closing ceremony of the 2016 Summer Paralympics.

== Results : Men's road race C4-5 ==
Rank	Name	Nationality	Classification	Time	Deficit
1st place, gold medalist(s)	Daniel Abraham Gebru	Netherlands	C5	02:13:08	0
2nd place, silver medalist(s)	Lauro Chaman	Brazil	C5	02:13:46	38
3rd place, bronze medalist(s)	Andrea Tarlao	Italy	C5	s.t.	s.t.
4	Patrik Kuril	Slovakia	C4	s.t.	s.t.
5	Alistair Donohoe	Australia	C5	02:14:03	55
6	Kyle Bridgwood	Australia	C4	02:15:41	02:33:00
7	Pierpaolo Addesi	Italy	C5	s.t.	s.t.
8	Wolfgang Eibeck	Austria	C5	02:17:45	04:37:00
9	Carol-Eduard Novak	Romania	C4	02:18:07	04:59:00
10	Edwin Matiz Ruiz	Colombia	C5	02:19:26	06:18:00
11	Jiri Bouska	Czech Republic	C4	s.t.	s.t.
12	Thomas Schafer	Germany	C4	s.t.	s.t.
13	Jiří Ježek	Czech Republic	C4	02:19:36	06:28:00
14	Soelito Gohr	Brazil	C5	02:24:25	11:17:00
15	Tomas Kajnar	Czech Republic	C5	s.t.	s.t.
16	José Frank Rodríguez	Dominican Republic	C5	02:27:07	13:59:00
17	Damian Lopez Alfonso	Cuba	C4	02:29:33	16:25:00
18	Leonel Solis	Costa Rica	C4	02:30:09	17:01:00
19	Jeffrey Martin	United States	C4	02:32:26	19:18:00
20	Christopher Murphy	United States	C5	s.t.	s.t.
21	Dane Wilson	South Africa	C5	02:38:50	25:42:00
22	Diego Duenas Gomez	Colombia	C4	02:46:29	33:21:00
-	Jozef Metelka	Slovakia	C4	DNF	-
-	Xinyang Liu	China	C5	DNF	-
-	Cesar Neira Perez	Spain	C4	DNF	-
-	Guoping Wei	China	C4	DNF	-
-	Bahman Golbarnezhad	Iran	C4	DNF	-
-	Masashi Ishii	Japan	C4	DNF	-
-	Alfonso Cabello Llamas	Spain	C5	DNF	-
-	Yegor Dementyev	Ukraine	C5	DSQ	-
