= Cycling at the 2016 Summer Paralympics – Men's individual pursuit =

The Men's individual pursuit cycling events at the 2016 Summer Paralympics took place on September 8–11 at Rio Olympic Velodrome. Six events took place over six classifications.

== Classification ==
Cyclists are given a classification depending on the type and extent of their disability. The classification system allows cyclists to compete against others with a similar level of function. The class number indicates the severity of impairment with "1" being most impaired.

Cycling classes for track cycling are:

- B: Blind and visually impaired cyclists use a Tandem bicycle with a sighted pilot on the front
- C 1-5: Cyclists with an impairment that affects their legs, arms and/or trunk but are capable of using a standard bicycle

== Men's individual pursuit ==
=== B ===
| Class | Gold | Silver | Bronze |
|---|---|---|---|
| B | Steve Bate; Great Britain | Vincent ter Schure; Netherlands | Stephen de Vries; Netherlands |

=== C1 ===
| Class | Gold | Silver | Bronze |
|---|---|---|---|
| C1 | Li Zhangyu; China | Ross Wilson; Canada | Arnoud Nijhuis; Netherlands |

=== C2 ===
| Class | Gold | Silver | Bronze |
|---|---|---|---|
| C2 | Liang Guihua; China | Tristen Chernove; Canada | Louis Rolfe; Great Britain |

=== C3 ===
| Class | Gold | Silver | Bronze |
|---|---|---|---|
| C3 | David Nicholas; Australia | Joseph Berenyi; United States | Eoghan Clifford; Ireland |

=== C4 ===
| Class | Gold | Silver | Bronze |
|---|---|---|---|
| C4 | Jozef Metelka; Slovakia | Kyle Bridgwood; Australia | Diego Dueñas; Colombia |

=== C5 ===
| Class | Gold | Silver | Bronze |
|---|---|---|---|
| C5 | Yegor Dementyev; Ukraine | Alistair Donohoe; Australia | Edwin Fabian Matiz Ruiz; Colombia |
