= Mohamed Amine Kalem =

Italian-Tunisian para table tennis player

Personal information
- Born: 27 January 1982 (age 44) Menzel Temime, Tunisia
- Height: 184 cm (6 ft 0 in)

Sport
- Country: Italy
- Sport: Para table tennis
- Disability class: C9
Medal record
Para table tennis
Representing Italy
Paralympic Games
Bronze medal – third place	2016 Rio de Janeiro	Men's singles C9
European Championships
Silver medal – second place	2017 Lasko	Men's teams C9

Mohamed Amine Kalem (born 27 January 1982) is an Italian-Tunisian para table tennis player who competes in international level events. He is a Paralympic bronze medalist and a European silver medalist.

Kalem was born with a shortened left leg.
