= Cycling at the 2016 Summer Paralympics – Women's individual pursuit =

The Women's individual pursuit cycling events at the 2016 Summer Paralympics took place on September 8–11 at Rio Olympic Velodrome. Four events took place over six classifications.

== Classification ==
Cyclists are given a classification depending on the type and extent of their disability. The classification system allows cyclists to compete against others with a similar level of function. The class number indicates the severity of impairment with "1" being most impaired.

Cycling classes for track cycling are:

- B: Blind and visually impaired cyclists use a Tandem bicycle with a sighted pilot on the front
- C 1-5: Cyclists with an impairment that affects their legs, arms and/or trunk but are capable of using a standard bicycle

== Women's individual pursuit ==
=== B ===
| Event | Gold | Silver | Bronze |
|---|---|---|---|
| B | Lora Turnham; Great Britain | Emma Foy; New Zealand | Sophie Thornhill; Great Britain |

=== C1–3 ===
| Event | Gold | Silver | Bronze |
|---|---|---|---|
| C1–3 | Megan Giglia; Great Britain | Jamie Whitmore; United States | Alyda Norbruis; Netherlands |

=== C4 ===
| Event | Gold | Silver | Bronze |
|---|---|---|---|
| C4 | Shawn Morelli; United States | Susan Powell; Australia | Megan Fisher; United States |

=== C5 ===
| Event | Gold | Silver | Bronze |
|---|---|---|---|
| C5 | Sarah Storey; Great Britain | Crystal Lane; Great Britain | Samantha Bosco; United States |
