= Colin Lynch (cyclist) =

Irish Paralympic cyclist

Personal information
- Nationality: Irish
- Born: 16 December 1970 (age 55) Singapore

Sport
- Country: Ireland
- Sport: Para-cycling
- Disability class: C2
- Event(s): Individual time trial, Track time trial, Individual pursuit
- Club: Manchester Wheelers
- Coached by: Neill Delahaye

Achievements and titles
- Personal best: C2 Class Paracycling World Hour Record – 43.133km (1 October 2016)
Medal record
Men's Para-cycling
Representing Ireland
Summer Paralympics
Silver medal – second place	2016 Rio de Janeiro	Road time trial C2
UCI Para-cycling Road World Championships
Gold medal – first place	2011 Roskilde	Road time trial (C2)
Bronze medal – third place	2013 Baie-Comeau	Road time trial (C2)
UCI Para-cycling Track World Championships
Gold medal – first place	2012 Los Angeles	3km pursuit (C2)
Bronze medal – third place	2014 Aguascalientes	3km pursuit (C2)
Silver medal – second place	2016 Montichiari	3km pursuit (C2)
UCI Para-cycling Road World Cups
Gold medal – first place	2011 Australia	Road time trial (C2)
Silver medal – second place	2011 Australia	Road race (C2)
Silver medal – second place	2011 Spain	Road time trial (C2)
Gold medal – first place	2013 Spain	Road time trial (C2)
Silver medal – second place	2013Italy	Road time trial (C2)
Silver medal – second place	2013 Canada	Road time trial (C2)
Gold medal – first place	2014 Italy	Road time trial (C2)
Gold medal – first place	2015 Italy	Road time trial (C2)
Gold medal – first place	2015 Switzerland	Road time trial (C2)
Gold medal – first place	2016 Spain	Road time trial (C2)
Silver medal – second place	2016 Belgium	Road time trial (C2)
Gold medal – first place	2017 Italy	Road time trial (C2)
Gold medal – first place	2017 Belgium	Road time trial (C2)
Gold medal – first place	2017 Netherlands	Road time trial (C2)

Colin Lynch (born 16 December 1970) is a retired Paralympic cyclist competing in C2 classification events for Ireland.

== Career ==
Lynch won a silver medal at the 2016 Summer Paralympics in the time trial C2 event.

Lynch started riding for the Irish Paracycling National Team in 2010. In 2011 he won his first UCI Paracycling World Cup Time Trial medal in Australia, followed by a silver medal in a World Cup time trial in Spain. In the World Championships in Roskilde, Denmark that year, Lynch won his first World Championship title in the time trial.

It was quickly followed up by another World Championship title in 2012 in the 3 km Pursuit in Los Angeles.

The London 2012 Paralympic Games were a disappointment for Lynch as he missed winning a bronze medal in the 3 km Pursuit by 1/10th of a second. Also finished 5th in the road time trial and crashed in the road race.

In 2013, Lynch returned to form, winning a bronze medal in the time trial in the World Championships in Canada. There were also silver medals in the time trial in World Cup races in Canada and Italy, a gold in Spain, and the overall UCI Paracycling World Cup title. The season was topped off with a bronze medal in the time trial in the World Championships in Canada.

2014 brought more success on the track, with a silver medal in the World Championships in the 3 km Pursuit in Mexico. A gold medal in the time trial in the World Cup event in Italy but a disappointing 5th place in the World Championships in the USA.

In 2015, disappointment again – losing out in the bronze medal ride-off in the 3 km Pursuit in the Track Cycling World Championships in the Netherlands. However, there were back-to-back World Cup time trial wins in Italy and Switzerland.

In 2016, more track success with a silver medal in the 3 km Pursuit in the World Championships in the Netherlands, followed by a World Cup silver and a gold in events in Belgium and Spain.

At the 2016 Paralympic Games, Lynch finished 5th in the 3 km Pursuit and won the silver medal in the time trial.

On 1 October 2016 in Manchester, UK, Lynch was the first Paracycling rider to set an Hour Record under revised and approved UCI rules. The distance ridden was 43.133 beating the previous World Best mark set by Laurent Thirionet in 1999 of 40.031 km.

== Personal life ==
Lynch broke his foot playing rugby aged sixteen and was then diagnosed with a spinal tumour. The tumour was removed but the cast was placed too tightly on his foot and caused tissue damage, and his left leg had to be amputated below the knee.

In addition, Lynch lost the use of the muscle below the knee on the opposite leg. The resulting disability placed him in the C2 class for Paracycling.

Lynch was born in Singapore and spent most of his early life in Canada. He competed for Ireland as his father was a native of Drogheda.
