= Max Weber (cyclist) =

German paralympic cyclist

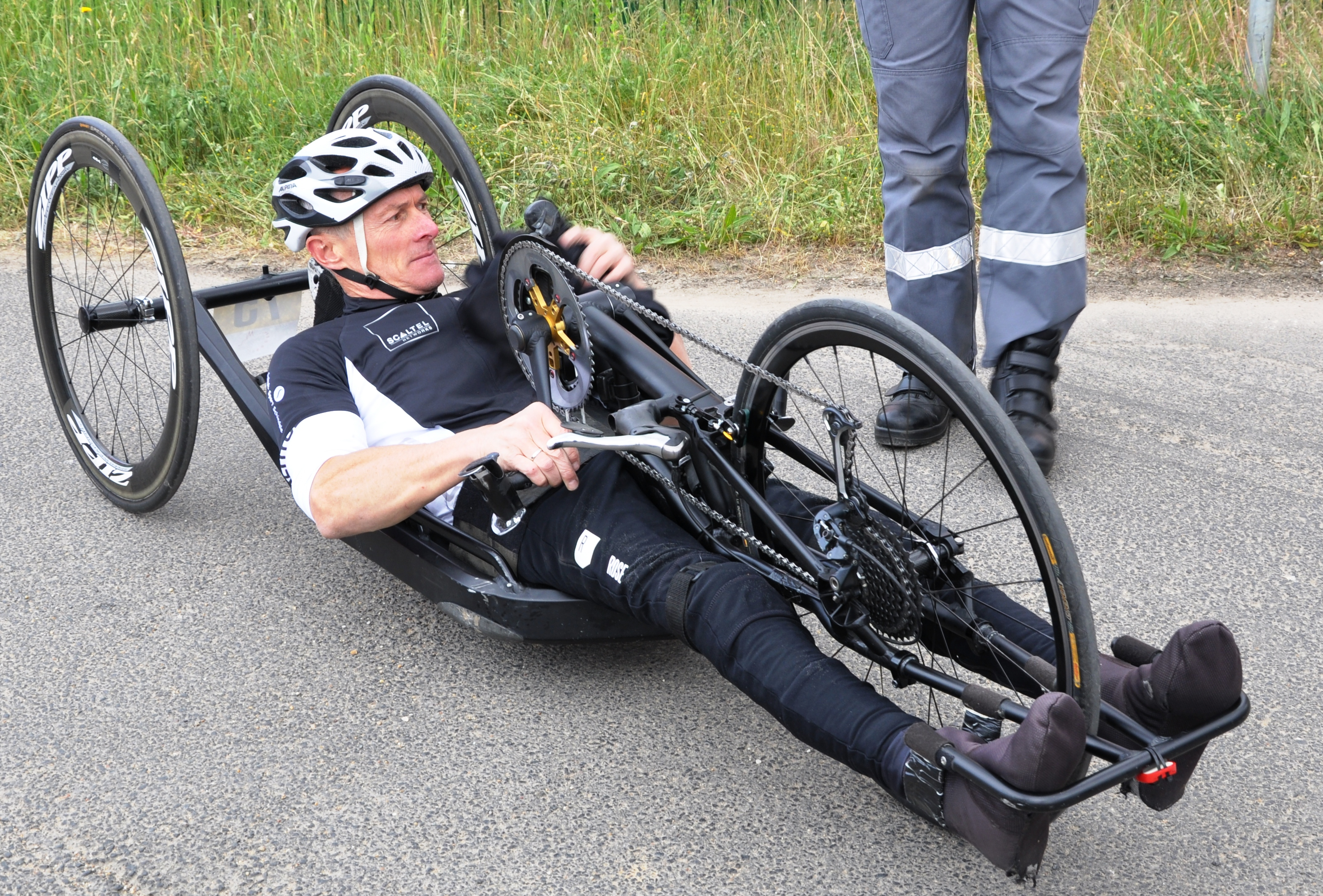
- Weber in 2016

Personal information
- Born: 9 August 1964 (age 61) Obergünzburg, Ostallgäu, Bavaria

Sport
- Country: Germany
- Sport: Road cycling
Medal record
Road cycling
Representing Germany
Paralympic Games
Silver medal – second place	2008 Beijing	Men's road race HC B
Silver medal – second place	2016 Rio de Janeiro	Men's road race H3

Max Weber (born 9 August 1964 in Obergünzburg) is a German paralympic cyclist. He competed in cycling events at the 2000, 2008, 2012 and 2016 Summer Paralympics, winning the silver medal in the men's road race HC B event in 2008, and another silver medal in 2016 in the men's road race H3 event.
