= Francesca Porcellato =

Italian paralympic athlete

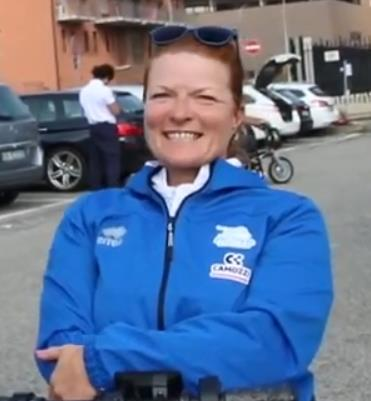
- Porcellato in 2018.

Personal information
- Nickname: La rossa volante (The flying red)
- Born: 5 September 1970 (age 56) Castelfranco Veneto, Italy
- Height: 1.63 m (5 ft 4 in)
- Weight: 50 kg (110 lb)

Sport
- Country: Italy
- Sport: Para Athletics; Para Cross-country skiing Para Cycling
- Club: Gruppo Ciclistico APRE (Para-cycling)
Medal record
Representing Italy
Event	1st	2nd	3rd
Summer Paralympics	2	4	7
Winter Paralympics	1	0	0
Para Athletics World Championships	4	3	2
Para Cycling World Championships	6	2	0
European Para Championships	1	2	0
Para Nordic Skiing World C'ships	0	1	0
Para Athletics European C'ships	0	7	3
Total	14	19	12
Women's para athletics
Paralympic Games
Gold medal – first place	1988 Seoul	100 m T53
Gold medal – first place	1988 Seoul	4x100 m T53
Silver medal – second place	1988 Seoul	200 m T53
Silver medal – second place	2004 Athens	100 m T53
Silver medal – second place	2004 Athens	800 m T53
Bronze medal – third place	1988 Seoul	4x200 m T53
Bronze medal – third place	1988 Seoul	4x400 m T53
Bronze medal – third place	1992 Barcelona	400 m TW3
Bronze medal – third place	2000 Sydney	100 m T53
Bronze medal – third place	2004 Athens	400 m T53
Women's para cross-country skiing
Paralympic Games
Gold medal – first place	2010 Vancouver	1 km sprint classic
Nordic Skiing World Championships
Silver medal – second place	2011 Khanty	5 km freestyle
Women's para-cycling
Paralympic Games
Silver medal – second place	2020 Tokyo	Time trial H1–3
Bronze medal – third place	2016 Rio	Time trial H1-2-3
Bronze medal – third place	2016 Rio	Road race H1-2-3-4
Road World Championships
Gold medal – first place	2015 Nottwil	Time Trial H3
Gold medal – first place	2015 Nottwil	Road race H3
Gold medal – first place	2017 Pietermaritzburg	Time Trial H3
Gold medal – first place	2017 Pietermaritzburg	Road race H3
Gold medal – first place	2018 Maniago	Time Trial H3
Gold medal – first place	2018 Maniago	Road race H3
Silver medal – second place	2022 Baie-Comeau	Time trial H3
Silver medal – second place	2022 Baie-Comeau	Road race H3
European Championships
Gold medal – first place	2023 Rotterdam	Road race H3
Silver medal – second place	2023 Rotterdam	Time trial H3
Silver medal – second place	2023 Rotterdam	Mixed team relay H1–H5

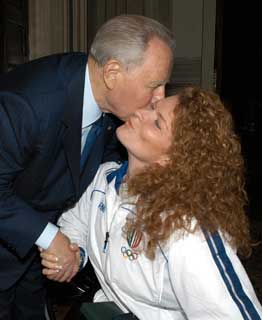
Porcellato with former Italian president Carlo Azeglio Ciampi in 2004.

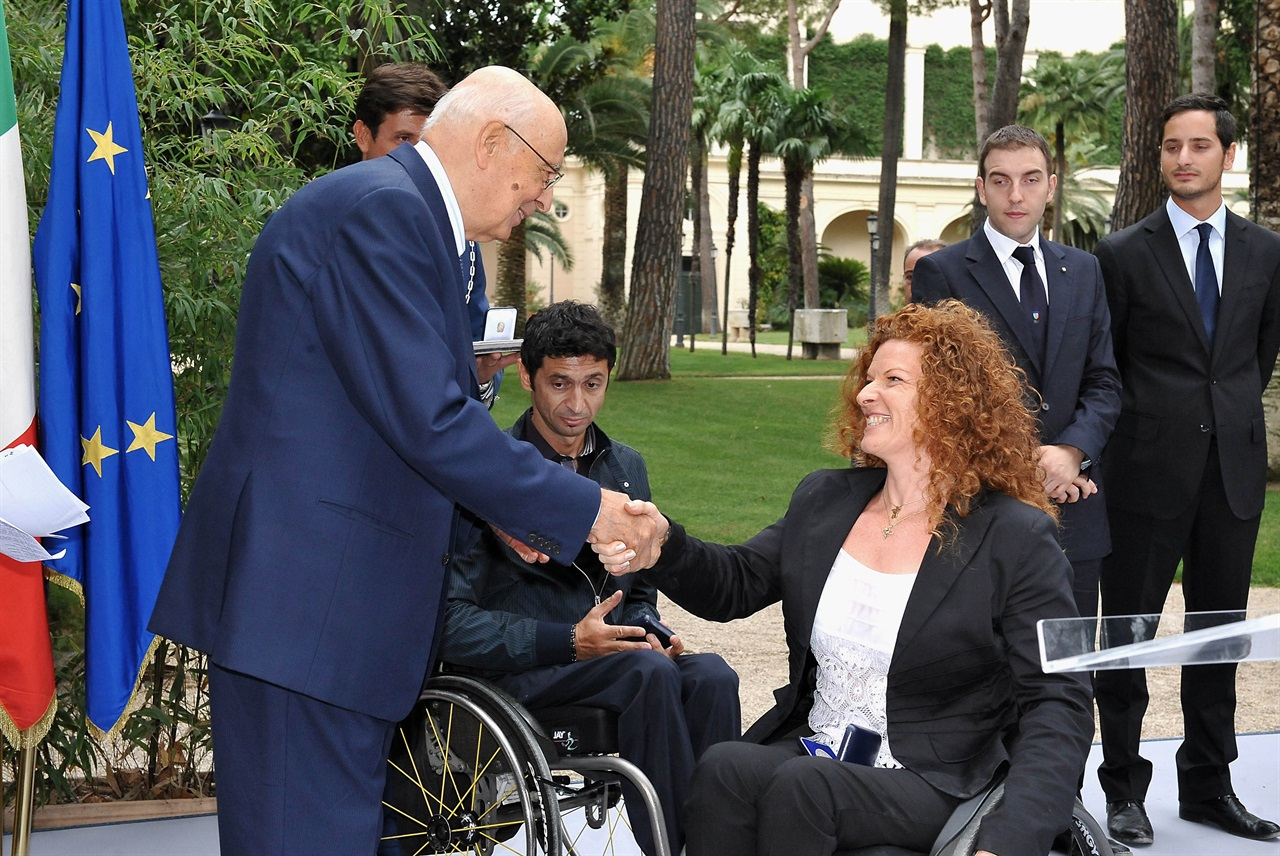
Porcellato with former Italian president Giorgio Napolitano in 2010.

Francesca Porcellato (born 5 September 1970) is an Italian disabled sportsperson who competed at international level in three different sports. Porcellato began her sporting career as a wheelchair racer competing in six Summer Paralympics before switching to Para Cross-country skiing where she won gold at the 2010 Winter Paralympics in the 1 km sprint. In 2015, she became six-time UCI Para-cycling World champion.

== Biography ==
Porcellato was hit by a truck when she was 2 years old and it broke her back. She discovered that she is paralyzed. In addition to participation in the Paralympics, she is one of two women to have won four London Marathon wheelchair races, shared with the Russian-born American Tatyana McFadden. She competed in wheelchair racing at every Summer Paralympic Games from 1988 to 2008, and in 2006 participated in the Winter Paralympics in cross-country sit-skiing. She won a total of two gold, three silver, and five bronze medals, all in athletics. She won the silver medal in the 800 metres T54 race at the 2009 Mediterranean Games. She lit the cauldron of the 2026 Winter Paralympics in Cortina d'Ampezzo.

== Statistics ==
=== Paralympic appearances ===
She was not present at this edition.

Francesca participated in eleven editions of the Paralympic Games, eight summer and three winter. She was the flag bearer for Italy at Vancouver 2010.

Sport	1988 Summer	1992 Summer	1996 Summer	2000 Summer	2004 Summer	2006 Winter	2008 Summer	2010 Winter	2012 Summer	2014 Winter	2016 Summer	2018 Winter	2020 Summer	Appearances
Para athletics	X	X	X	X	X		X							6
Para cross-country skiing						X		X		X				3
Para cycling											X		X	2

=== Achievements ===
Year	Competition	Venue	100 m	200 m	400 m	800 m	4x100 m	4x200 m	4x400 m	5 km freestyle	Time trial	Road race
Para athletics
1988	Summer Paralympics	(South Korea) Seoul	1st place, gold medalist(s)	2nd place, silver medalist(s)			1st place, gold medalist(s)	3rd place, bronze medalist(s)	3rd place, bronze medalist(s)			
1992	Summer Paralympics	(Spain) Barcelona			3rd place, bronze medalist(s)							
2000	Summer Paralympics	(Australia) Sydney	3rd place, bronze medalist(s)									
2004	Summer Paralympics	(Greece) Athens	2nd place, silver medalist(s)		3rd place, bronze medalist(s)	2nd place, silver medalist(s)						
Para cross-country skiing
2010	Winter Paralympics	(Canada) Vancouver								1st place, gold medalist(s)		
Para cycling
2016	Summer Paralympics	(Brazil) Rio de Janeiro									3rd place, bronze medalist(s)	3rd place, bronze medalist(s)
2021	Summer Paralympics	(Japan) Tokyo									2nd place, silver medalist(s)	

=== Other results ===
Porcellato won seven International marathons.

- New York City Marathon
  - Wheelchair race: 2001
- Boston Marathon
  - Wheelchair race: 2015
- London Marathon
  - Wheelchair race: 2003, 2003, 2005, 2006
- Paris Marathon
  - Wheelchair race: ????

== See also ==
- Italy at the Summer Paralympics - Multiple medallists
