= Lauro Chaman =

Brazilian cyclist (born 1987)

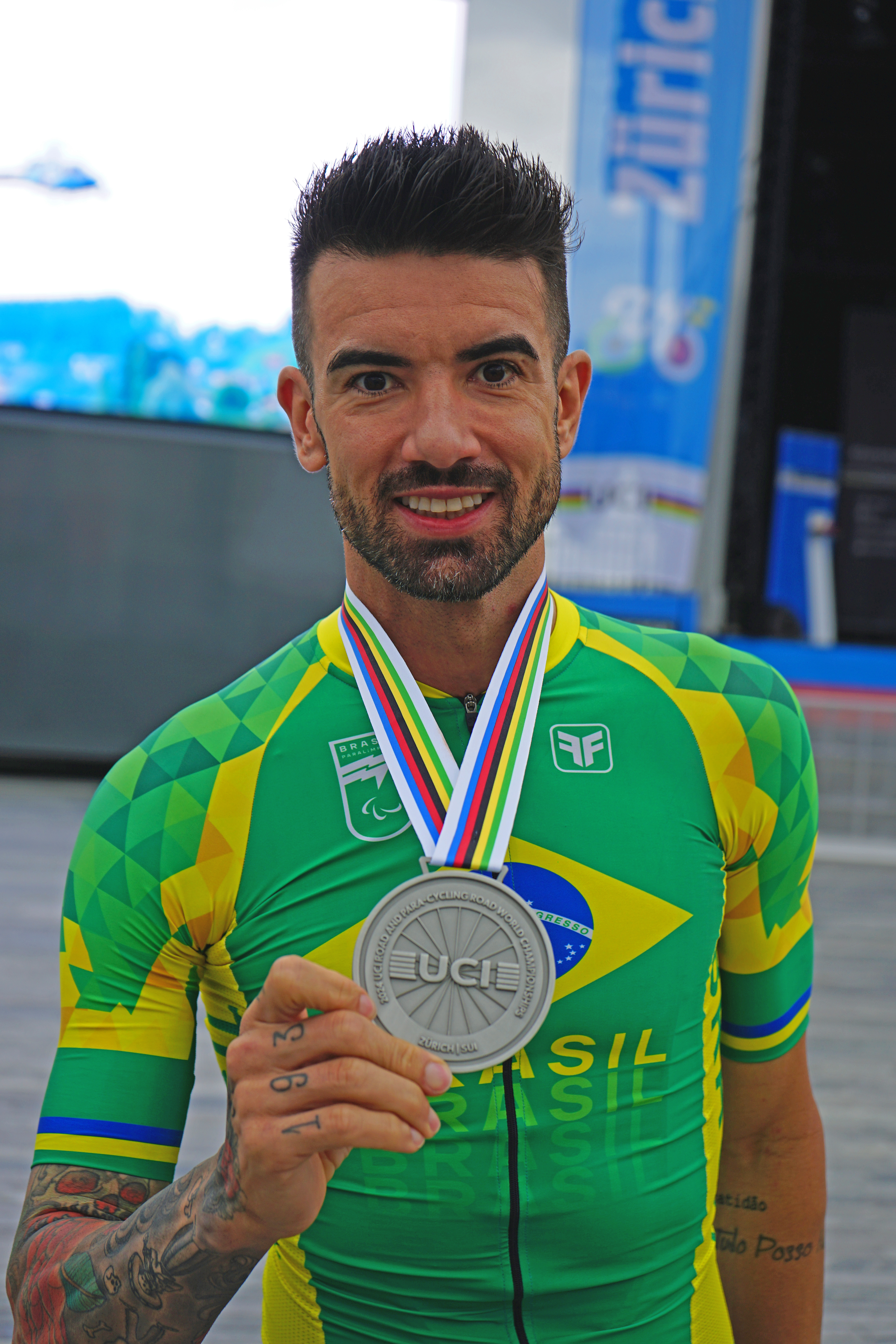
- Chaman at the 2024 UCI Para-cycling Road World Championships

Personal information
- Full name: Lauro César Mouro Chaman
- Born: 25 June 1987 (age 39) Araraquara, Brazil

Cycling career
- Sport: Cycling
- Current team: Memorial–Santos–Fupes
- Discipline: Road
- Role: Rider

Amateur teams
- 2015–2016: Memorial–Santos–Fupes
- 2018: Funvic/Soul Brasil Pro Cycling
- 2019–: Memorial–Santos–Fupes

Professional teams
- 2014: Memorial–Prefeitura de Santos
- 2017: Soul Brasil Pro Cycling
Medal record
Para cycling
Representing Brazil
Paralympic Games
| Silver medal – second place | 2016 Rio de Janeiro | Road race C4–5 |
| Bronze medal – third place | 2016 Rio de Janeiro | Road time trial C5 |
Road World Championships
| Gold medal – first place | 2017 Pietermaritzburg | Road race C5 |
| Gold medal – first place | 2021 Cascais | Road race C5 |
| Gold medal – first place | 2025 Ronse | Road race C5 |
| Silver medal – second place | 2010 Baie-Comeau | Road race C5 |
| Silver medal – second place | 2014 Greenville | Road race C5 |
| Silver medal – second place | 2018 Maniago | Time trial C5 |
| Silver medal – second place | 2022 Baie-Comeau | Road race C5 |
| Silver medal – second place | 2023 Glasgow | Time trial C5 |
| Silver medal – second place | 2024 Zurich | Time trial C5 |
| Bronze medal – third place | 2010 Baie-Comeau | Time trial C5 |
| Bronze medal – third place | 2019 Pietermaritzburg | Time trial C5 |
| Bronze medal – third place | 2019 Emmen | Time trial C5 |
| Bronze medal – third place | 2021 Cascais | Time trial C5 |
| Bronze medal – third place | 2024 Zurich | Road race C5 |
Track World Championships
| Gold medal – first place | 2018 Rio de Janeiro | Scratch C4-5 |
| Silver medal – second place | 2017 Los Angeles | Individual pursuit C5 |
| Silver medal – second place | 2020 Milton | Individual pursuit C5 |
| Silver medal – second place | 2020 Milton | Omnium C5 |
| Silver medal – second place | 2024 Rio de Janeiro | Individual pursuit C5 |
| Silver medal – second place | 2025 Rio de Janeiro | Elimination C5 |
| Silver medal – second place | 2026 Apeldoorn | Elimination C5 |
| Bronze medal – third place | 2017 Los Angeles | 1km time trial C5 |
| Bronze medal – third place | 2017 Los Angeles | Scratch C5 |
| Bronze medal – third place | 2020 Milton | Scratch race C5 |
| Bronze medal – third place | 2022 Saint-Quentin-en-Yvelines | Omnium C5 |
| Bronze medal – third place | 2023 Glasgow | Omnium C5 |
| Bronze medal – third place | 2023 Glasgow | Scratch race C5 |
Parapan American Games
| Gold medal – first place | 2015 Toronto | Road race C4-5 |
| Gold medal – first place | 2015 Toronto | Time trial C1-5 |
| Gold medal – first place | 2019 Lima | Road race C4-5 |
| Gold medal – first place | 2019 Lima | Individual pursuit C4-5 |
| Gold medal – first place | 2023 Santiago | Individual pursuit C4-5 |
| Silver medal – second place | 2015 Toronto | Individual pursuit C4-5 |
| Silver medal – second place | 2019 Lima | Time trial C1-5 |
| Silver medal – second place | 2023 Santiago | Time trial C1-5 |
| Silver medal – second place | 2023 Santiago | Road race C4-5 |

Lauro César Mouro Chaman (born 25 June 1987) is a Brazilian para cyclist, who currently rides for Memorial–Santos–Fupes.

== Career ==
In the 2016 Summer Paralympics, Chaman won the bronze medal in the C5 time trial, and finished second to Daniel Abraham Gebru in the C4–5 road race.

In 2017, Chaman joined UCI Professional Continental team Soul Brasil Pro Cycling.

The following season, he won the Brazilian National Time Trial Championships.

== Major results ==
2018
1st Time trial, National Road Championships
2019
5th Time trial, National Road Championships
2021
1st Time trial, National Road Championships
2022
National Road Championships

1st Time trial
4th Road race

4th Time trial, Pan American Road Championships
