= Tobias Fankhauser =

Swiss paralympic cyclist

Sport
- Country: Switzerland
- Sport: Road cycling
Medal record
Representing Switzerland
Paralympic Games
Road cycling
Silver medal – second place	2012 London	Men's road race H1
Bronze medal – third place	2016 Rio de Janeiro	Men's road race H2

Tobias Fankhauser is a Swiss paralympic cyclist. He participated at the 2012 Summer Paralympics in the cycling competition, being awarded the silver medal in the men's road race H1 event. Fankhauser also participated at the 2016 Summer Paralympics in the cycling competition, being awarded the bronze medal in the men's road race H2 event.
