= Brian Sheridan =

American Paralympic cyclist

Personal information
- Born: October 13, 1975 (age 51) Bay City, Michigan

Cycling career
- Sport: Cycling
Medal record
Men's para-cycling
Representing United States
Summer Paralympics
Bronze medal – third place	2016 Rio de Janeiro	Road time trial H2
Parapan American Games
Gold medal – first place	2015 Toronto	Time trial H1-5
Silver medal – second place	2015 Toronto	Road race H1-2

Brian Sheridan (born October 13, 1975) is an American Paralympic cyclist. In 2016, he represented the United States at the Summer Paralympics held in Rio de Janeiro, Brazil and he won the bronze medal in the men's road time trial H2 event. In 2015, he won one gold medal and one silver medal in cycling at the Parapan American Games held in Toronto, Canada.
