= Liang Guihua =

Chinese Paralympic cyclist

Personal information
- Nationality: Chinese

Sport
- Sport: Cycling
Medal record
Representing China
Men's Paralympic cycling
Summer Paralympics
Gold medal – first place	2016 Rio de Janeiro	Individual pursuit C2
Bronze medal – third place	2016 Rio de Janeiro	Road time trial C2
Bronze medal – third place	2020 Tokyo	Individual pursuit C2
Asian Para Games
Gold medal – first place	2018 Jakarta	Road time trial C1–2

Liang Guihua is a Chinese cyclist. He won the gold medal at the Men's C2 3000 meter individual pursuit event at the 2016 Summer Paralympics with 3:44.553. He also won the bronze medal at the Men's road time trial C2 event, with 28:17.77.
