= Vittorio Podestà =

Italian Paralympic cyclist

Personal information
- Nationality: Italian
- Born: 1 June 1973 (age 53) Lavagna, Italy

Sport
- Country: Italy
- Sport: Para-cycling
- Disability: Spinal Cord Injuries
- Disability class: H3
- Club: ASD A Ruota Libera
- Coached by: Francesco Chiappero
Medal record
Event	1st	2nd	3rd
Paralympic Games	2	2	2
World Championships	8	2	2

Vittorio Podestà (born 3 June 1973 in Lavagna) is a male Italian paralympic cyclist.

== Biography ==
He is an engineer and he lives in Chiavari with his wife Barbara.

== Achievements ==
Year	Competition	Venue	Position	Event	Notes
2008	Paralympics Games	(China) Beijing	2nd	Time Trial HCB	
2012	Paralympics Games	(United Kingdom) London	2nd	Team Relay	
2012	Paralympics Games	(United Kingdom) London	3rd	Time Trial H2	
2012	Paralympics Games	(United Kingdom) London	3rd	Road Race H2	
2016	Paralympics Games	(Brazil) Rio de Janeiro	1st	Time Trial H3	
2016	Paralympics Games	(Brazil) Rio de Janeiro	1st	Team Relay	

== See also ==
- Italy at the 2008 Summer Paralympics
- Italy at the 2012 Summer Paralympics
- Italy at the 2016 Summer Paralympics
