= Daniel Abraham (cyclist) =

Dutch-Eritrean cyclist (born 1985)

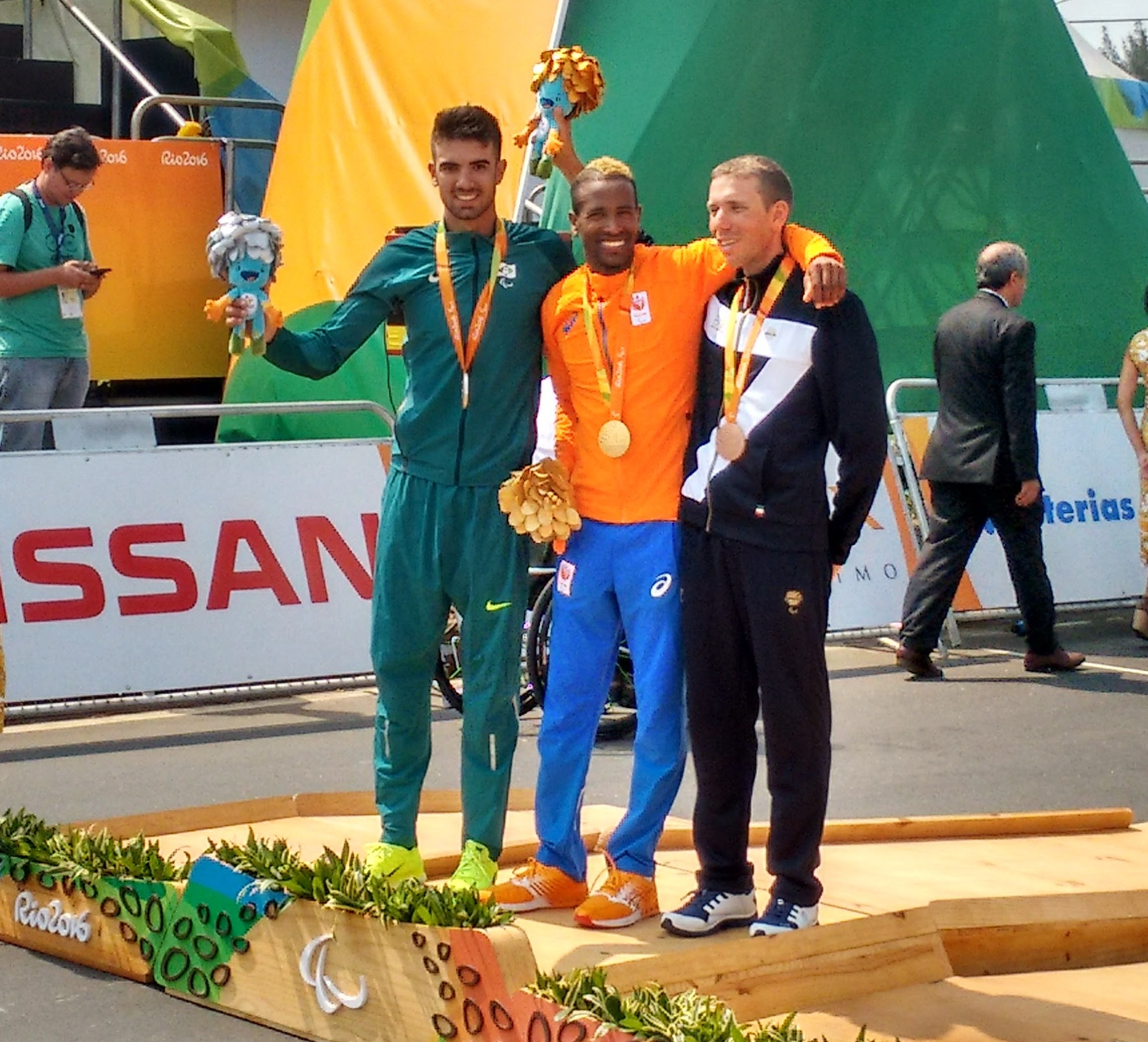
- Abraham (center) at the 2016 Summer Paralympics

Personal information
- Full name: Daniel Abraham Gebru
- Born: 11 February 1985 (age 41) Ethiopia

Cycling career
- Sport: Cycling
- Disciplines: Road; Track
- Role: Rider

Amateur teams
- 2014: WTC de Amstel
- 2016: Marco Polo
- 2017: Willebrord Wil Vooruit

Professional teams
- 2010–2012: Marco Polo Cycling Team
- 2013–2015: CCN
- 2018–2020: BEAT Cycling Club
Medal record
Men's para-cycling
Representing Netherlands
Paralympic Games
Gold medal – first place	2016 Rio de Janeiro	Road race C4-5
Gold medal – first place	2020 Tokyo	Road time trial C5
Gold medal – first place	2024 Paris	Road time trial C5
Bronze medal – third place	2020 Tokyo	Road race C4-5
Road World Championships
Gold medal – first place	2017 Pietermaritzburg	Time Trial C5
Gold medal – first place	2018 Maniago	Time Trial C5
Gold medal – first place	2021 Cascais	Time Trial C5
Gold medal – first place	2022 Baie-Comeau	Time Trial C5
Gold medal – first place	2023 Glasgow	Time Trial C5
Gold medal – first place	2024 Zurich	Time trial C5
Silver medal – second place	2019 Emmen	Time Trial C5
Bronze medal – third place	2025 Ronse	Time trial C5
Track World Championships
Gold medal – first place	2023 Glasgow	Scratch race C5
Gold medal – first place	2025 Rio de Janeiro	Scratch race C5
Silver medal – second place	2020 Milton	Scratch race C5
Bronze medal – third place	2018 Rio de Janeiro	Individual pursuit C5
Bronze medal – third place	2018 Rio de Janeiro	Scratch race C5
Bronze medal – third place	2019 Apeldoorn	Individual pursuit C5
Bronze medal – third place	2019 Apeldoorn	Scratch race C5
Bronze medal – third place	2022 Saint-Quentin-en-Yvelines	Individual pursuit C5
Bronze medal – third place	2022 Saint-Quentin-en-Yvelines	Scratch race C5
European Championships
Gold medal – first place	2023 Rotterdam	Road race C5
Silver medal – second place	2023 Rotterdam	Time trial C5

Daniel Abraham Gebru (born 11 February 1985) is a Dutch-Eritrean cyclist, who most recently rode for UCI Continental team BEAT Cycling Club.

== Career ==
Abraham moved to the Netherlands in 2000 and raced for the Marco Polo Cycling Team between 2010 and 2012. He focused on racing in paralympic events, for which he was eligible because of an underdeveloped leg.

In 2016 he competed for the Netherlands in the Summer Paralympics. Abraham only had a residence permit, but was allowed to compete as a stateless citizen on behalf of the Netherlands in the C4–5 road race. During the race, Abraham was in position to win the bronze medal, but just before the finish the two leaders: Australian Alistair Donohoe and Ukrainian Yegor Dementyev, both crashed, and Abraham took the win. After this, he was decorated as a Knight in the Order of Orange-Nassau. He was issued a Dutch passport on 22 August 2017.

== Major results ==
=== Road ===
2016
1st C4–5 road race, Summer Paralympics
2017
1st C5 Time trial, UCI Para Road World Championships
2018
1st C5 Time trial, UCI Para Road World Championships
9th Chrono Champenois
9th Duo Normand
2019
2nd C5 Time trial, UCI Para Road World Championships
1st Stage 1 Kreiz Breizh Elites (TTT)
2021
1st C4–5 road race, Summer Paralympics
1st C5 Time trial, UCI Para Road World Championships
2022
1st C5 Time trial, UCI Para Road World Championships
2023
1st C5 Time trial, UCI Para Road World Championships
European Para Championships

1st C5 Road race
2nd C5 Time trial

=== Track ===
2018
UCI Para Track World Championships

3rd C5 Individual pursuit
3rd Scratch

2019
UCI Para Track World Championships

3rd C5 Individual pursuit
3rd Scratch

2020
2nd C5 Scratch, UCI Para Track World Championships
2022
UCI Para Track World Championships

3rd C5 Individual pursuit
3rd Scratch

2023
1st C5 Scratch, UCI Para Track World Championships
