= Ross Wilson (cyclist) =

Canadian para-cyclist

Personal information
- Born: December 10, 1981 (age 44) Sherwood Park, Alberta, Canada
Medal record
Men's Para-cycling
Representing Canada
2016 Summer Paralympics
Silver medal – second place	2016 Rio de Janeiro	Individual Pursuit C1
Silver medal – second place	2016 Rio de Janeiro	Road time trial C1

Ross Wilson (born December 10, 1981) is a Canadian para-cyclist.

== Early life ==
Wilson was born on December 10, 1981, in Sherwood Park, Alberta.

== Career ==
In his 20s, Wilson began noticing his gait changing and he would constantly be rolling his ankles. He was eventually diagnosed with Charcot–Marie–Tooth disease, a neurological condition that affected his nerves and muscles. After losing over 100 pounds, he bought himself a bike to stay active and continue to lose weight. He subsequently joined the Juventus Cycling Club in 2012 where he met coach Cam Jennings. By 2014, he joined the Argyll Velodrome Association and raced in the 2014 UCI Para-cycling Road World Championships.

While training for the 2015 UCI Para-cycling Road World Championships, Wilson was struck by a car backing out of a parking spot. As his body flew through the back window, he broke his clavicle, some ribs, and vertebrae. However, he recovered by 2016 and was named to Team Canada's roster for the 2016 Summer Paralympics. To qualify for the Paralympics, Wilson set a new world and Paralympic record at 3:53.66, which was beaten five minutes later by Zhangyu at 3:50.373. Wilson ended his first Paralympic Games with two silver medals; one in men’s c1 individual pursuit and another in the men’s c1 road time trial.

In 2017, Wilson earned a gold medal at the 2017 UCI Para-cycling Track World Championships in the C1 men's 3,000 metre individual pursuit. He would later take home a silver medal at the 2017 UCI Para-cycling Road World Championships, losing to Germany’s Michael Teuber.

The following year, Wilson earned a silver medal after finishing 2.362 seconds behind Ricardo Argiles at the 2018 UCI Para-cycling Track World Championships in Rio de Janeiro, Brazil. He also earned a bronze medal at the 2019 UCI Para-cycling Road World Championships. At the 2018–19 UCI Track Cycling World Cup, Wilson set a new world record for the C1 Men’s Individual Pursuit with a time of 3:49.450.
