= Giancarlo Masini =

Italian Paralympic cyclist

Personal information
- Born: 10 January 1970 (age 56) Pontevico, Italy

Sport
- Country: Italy
- Sport: Para cycling
- Disability: Spinal Cord Injuries
- Disability class: C1
- Club: G.S. Fiamme Azzurre
- Coached by: Mario Valentini
Medal record
Event	1st	2nd	3rd
Paralympic Games	0	0	1
Road World Para Cycling C'ships	0	1	1
Track World Para Cycling C'ships	0	1	0
Total	0	2	2

Giancarlo Masini (born 10 January 1970) is a former Italian paralympic cyclist who won a bronze medal at the 2016 Summer Paralympics.
