= Fabio Anobile =

Italian Paralympic cyclist

Personal information
- Born: 16 December 1993 (age 32) Saronno, Italy

Sport
- Country: Italy
- Sport: Para cycling
- Disability: Impaired range of motion
- Disability class: C3
- Club: G.S. Fiamme Azzurre
- Coached by: Mario Valentini
Medal record
Event	1st	2nd	3rd
Paralympic Games	0	0	1
Road World Para Cycling C'ships	1	0	3
Track World Para Cycling C'ships	0	1	0
Total	1	1	4

Fabio Anobile (born 16 December 1993) is an Italian paralympic cyclist who won a bronze medal at the 2016 Summer Paralympics.
