= Charles Moreau (cyclist) =

Canadian Paralympic cyclist

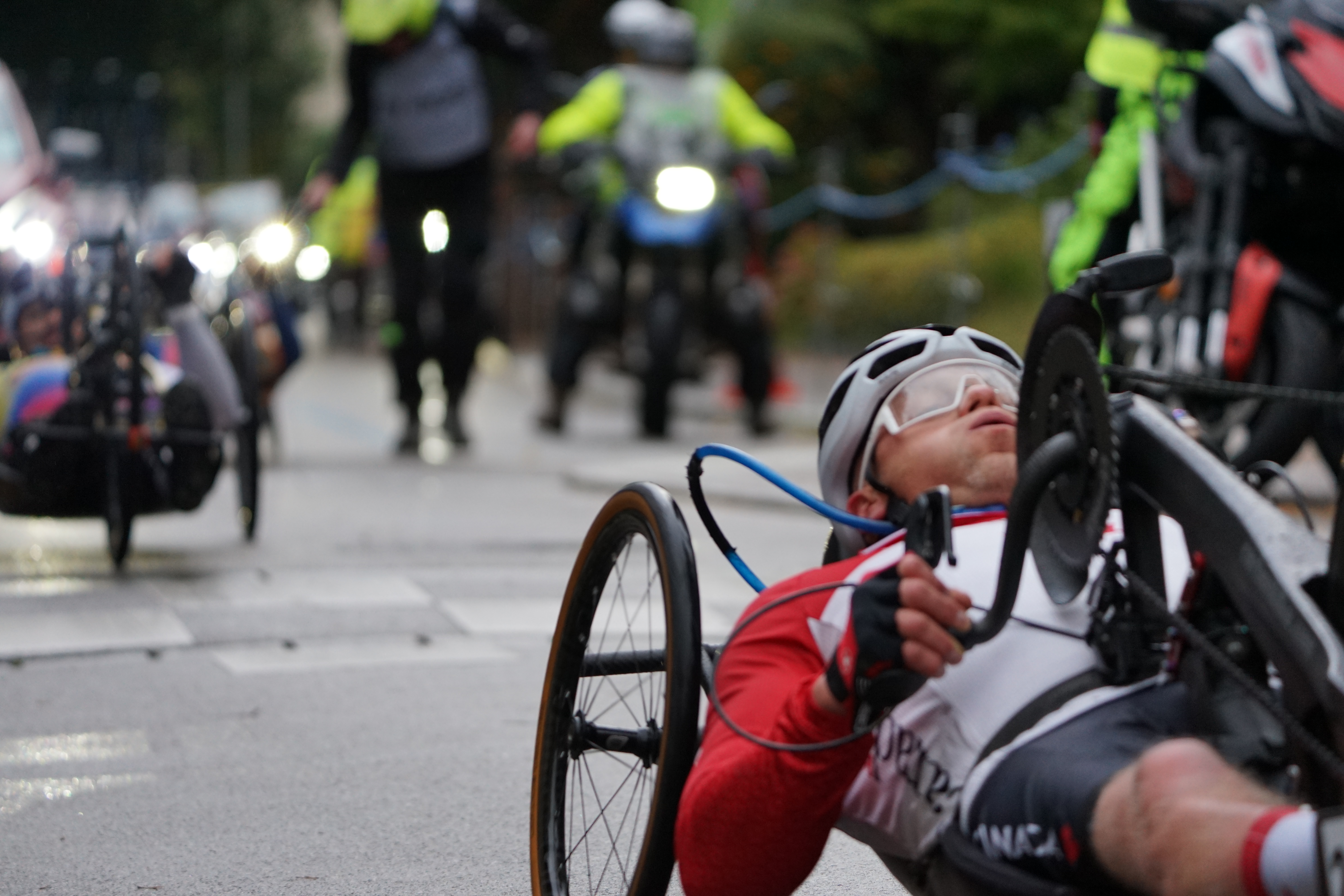
- Charles Moreau in a steep climb at the 2024 World Championships

Personal information
- Born: 11 April 1982 (age 44) Victoriaville, Quebec, Canada

Sport
- Country: Canada
- Sport: Paralympic cycling
- Disability class: H3
Medal record
Paralympic cycling
Representing Canada
Paralympic Games
Bronze medal – third place	2016 Rio de Janeiro	Road race H3
Bronze medal – third place	2016 Rio de Janeiro	Road time trial H3
Parapan American Games
Bronze medal – third place	2015 Toronto	Road race H3
Bronze medal – third place	2015 Toronto	Road time trial H3
Paratriathlon
ITU World Championships
Silver medal – second place	2009 Gold Coast	Paratriathlon TRI-1

Charles Moreau (born 11 April 1982) is a Canadian Paralympic cyclist who competes at international elite cycling competitions. He is a double Paralympic and Parapan American Games bronze medalist in road cycling.

== Accident ==
On 20 January 2008, Moreau was involved in a serious car accident. His car broke down on a bridge near Trois-Rivières, he waited for a tow truck to recover his vehicle. Ten minutes later, a truck collided into his car and left him paralysed from the waist down. Moreau tried out paratriathlon and won a silver medal at the 2009 World Championships and three fourth-place positions in other world triathlon championships, he switched to cycling and has won numerous medals and victories at four World Cups since 2015.
