= Paolo Cecchetto =

Italian Paralympic cyclist

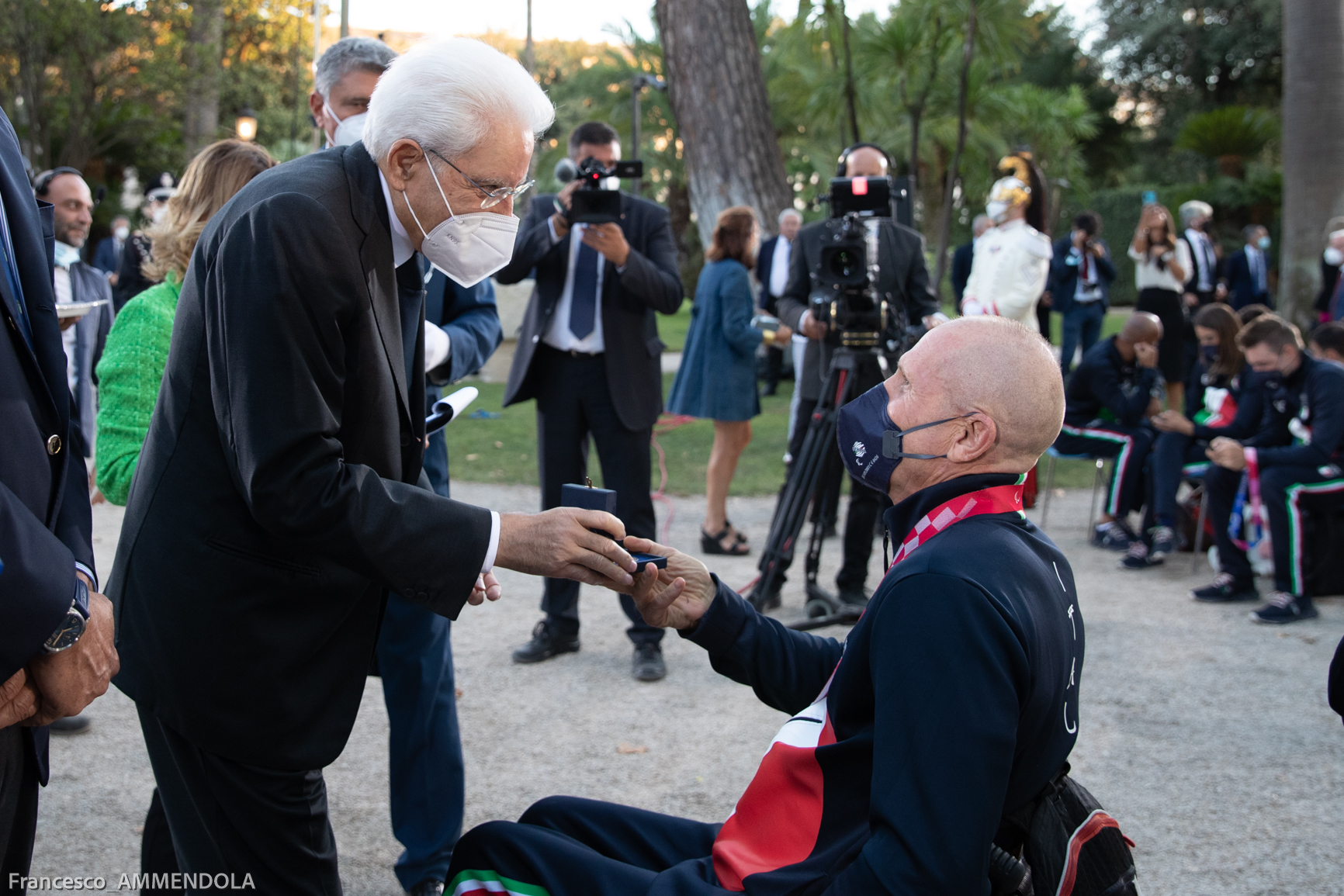
- Cecchetto awarded by the Italian President Sergio Mattarella at Quirinale Palace in 2021.

Personal information
- National team: Italy
- Born: 19 July 1967 (age 59) Legnano, Italy

Sport
- Sport: Para cycling
Medal record
Event	1st	2nd	3rd
Paralympic Games	2	0	0
World Para Cycling C'ships	3	2	0
Total	5	2	0

Paolo Cecchetto (born 19 July 1967) is an Italian paralympic cyclist who won a gold medal at the Summer Paralympics.

== See also ==
- Italy at the 2020 Summer Paralympics
