= Luca Mazzone =

Italian Paralympic cyclist

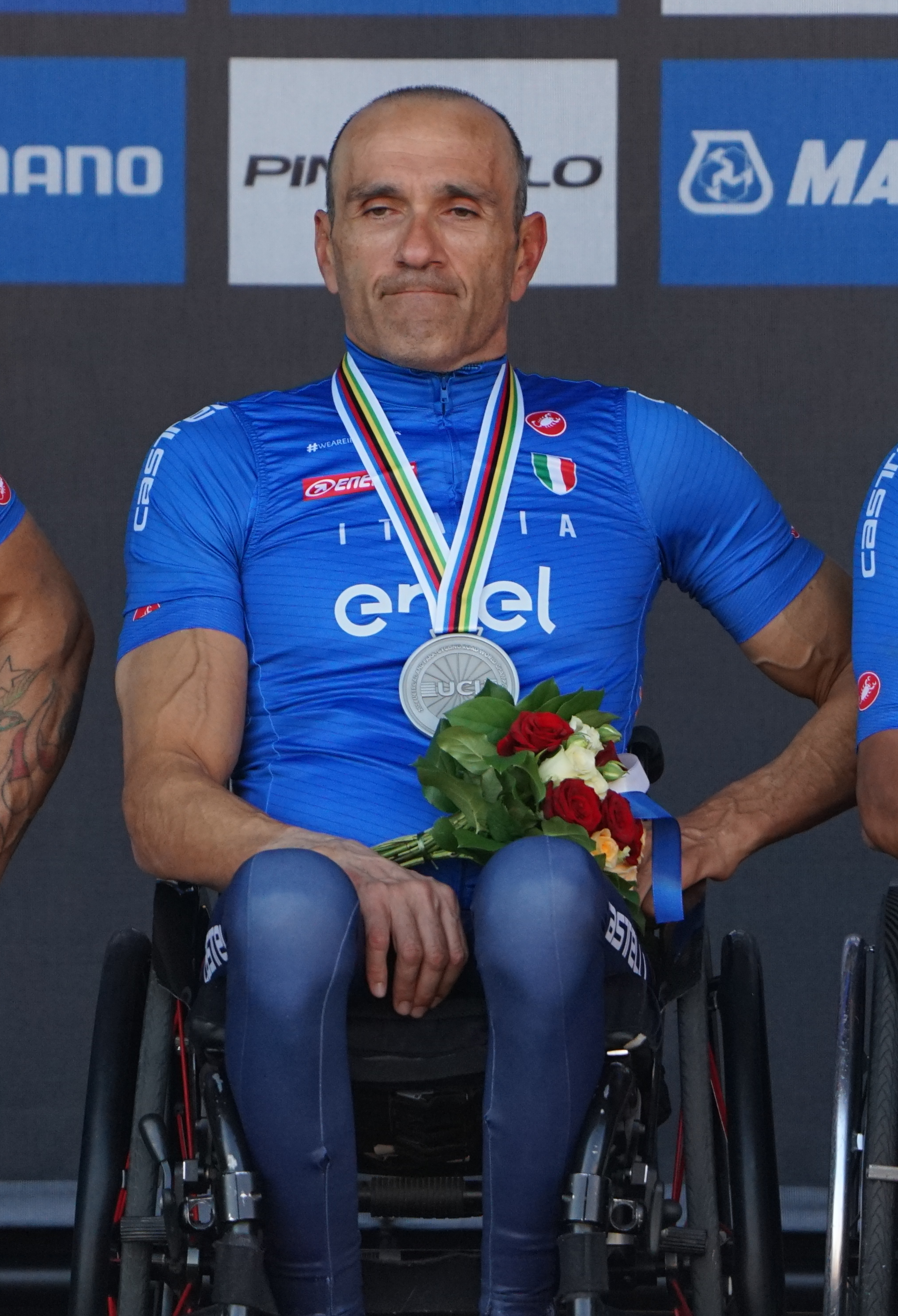
- Mazzone winning silver at World Championships 2024 in Zurich

Personal information
- National team: Italy
- Born: 3 May 1971 (age 55) Terlizzi, Italy

Sport
- Sport: Para swimming Para cycling
- Disability class: H2
- Club: Canottieri Aniene (till 2008)
Medal record
| Event | 1st | 2nd | 3rd |
|---|---|---|---|
| Paralympic Games | 3 | 6 | 1 |
| World Para Swimming C'ships | 0 | 0 | 3 |
| World Para Cycling C'ships | 19 | 4 | 0 |
| European Para Championships | 0 | 0 | 2 |
| Total | 22 | 10 | 6 |

Luca Mazzone (born 3 May 1971) is an Italian paralympic cyclist and former para swimmer who won eight medals at the Summer Paralympics (3 gold and 3 silver in cycling, 2 silver in swimming).

== Career ==
He competed in five Paralympics, three in Swimming (2000, 2004, 2008) and two in Cycling (2016, 2020). He also won 18 world titles in cycling.

== See also ==
- Italy at the 2000 Summer Paralympics - Medalists
- Italy at the 2016 Summer Paralympics - Medalists
- Italy at the 2020 Summer Paralympics - Medalists
