= Flamengo Park =

Largest public park in Rio de Janeiro, Brazil

Coordinates: 22.921°S 43.170°W

Flamengo Park Aterro do Flamengo Eduardo Gomes Park
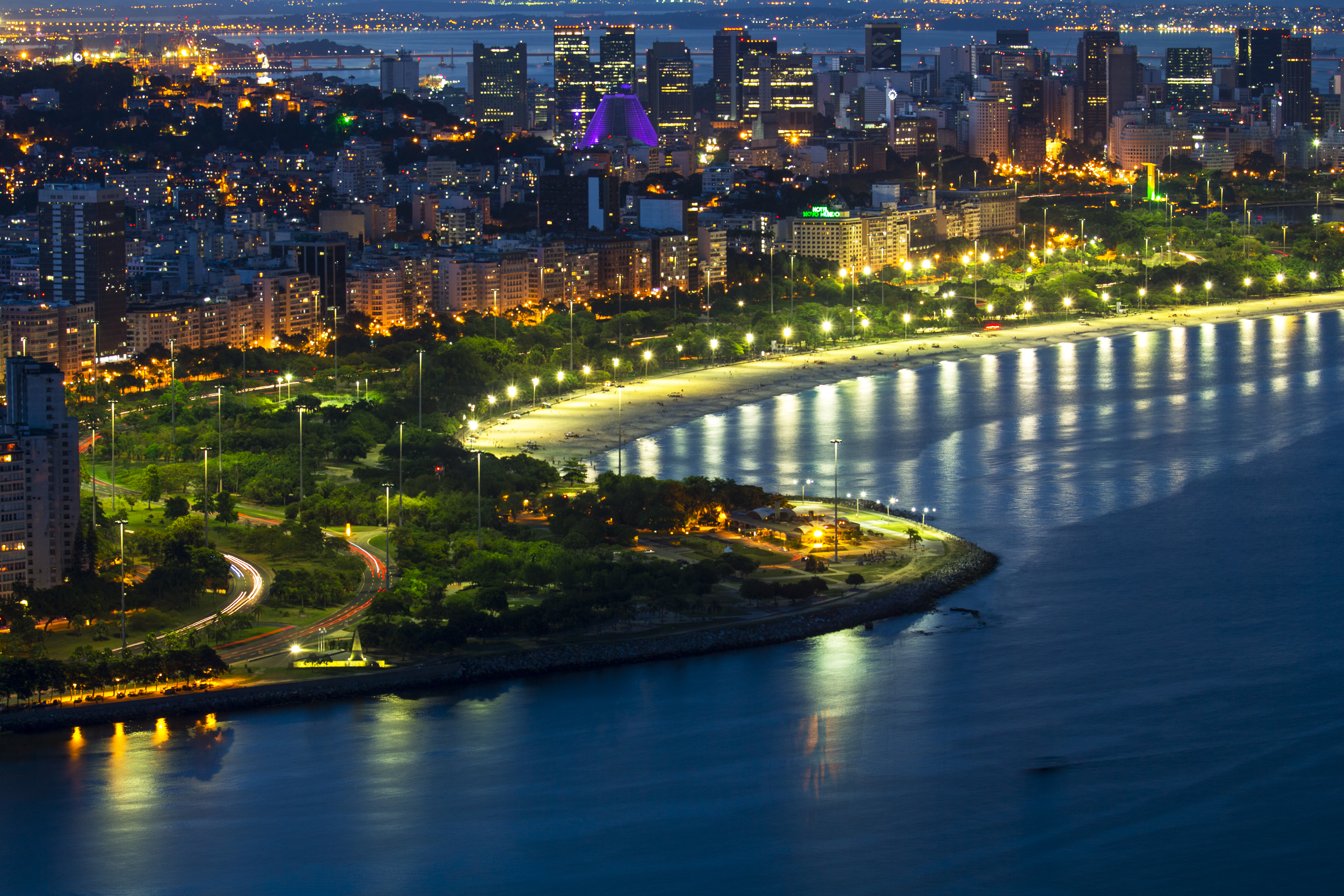
- Aterro do Flamengo at night
- Interactive map of Flamengo Park; Aterro do Flamengo; Eduardo Gomes Park
- Type: Urban park
- Location: Rio de Janeiro
- Area: 296 acres (120 ha)
- Created: 1965
- Operator: Fundação Parques e Jardins
- Open: All year

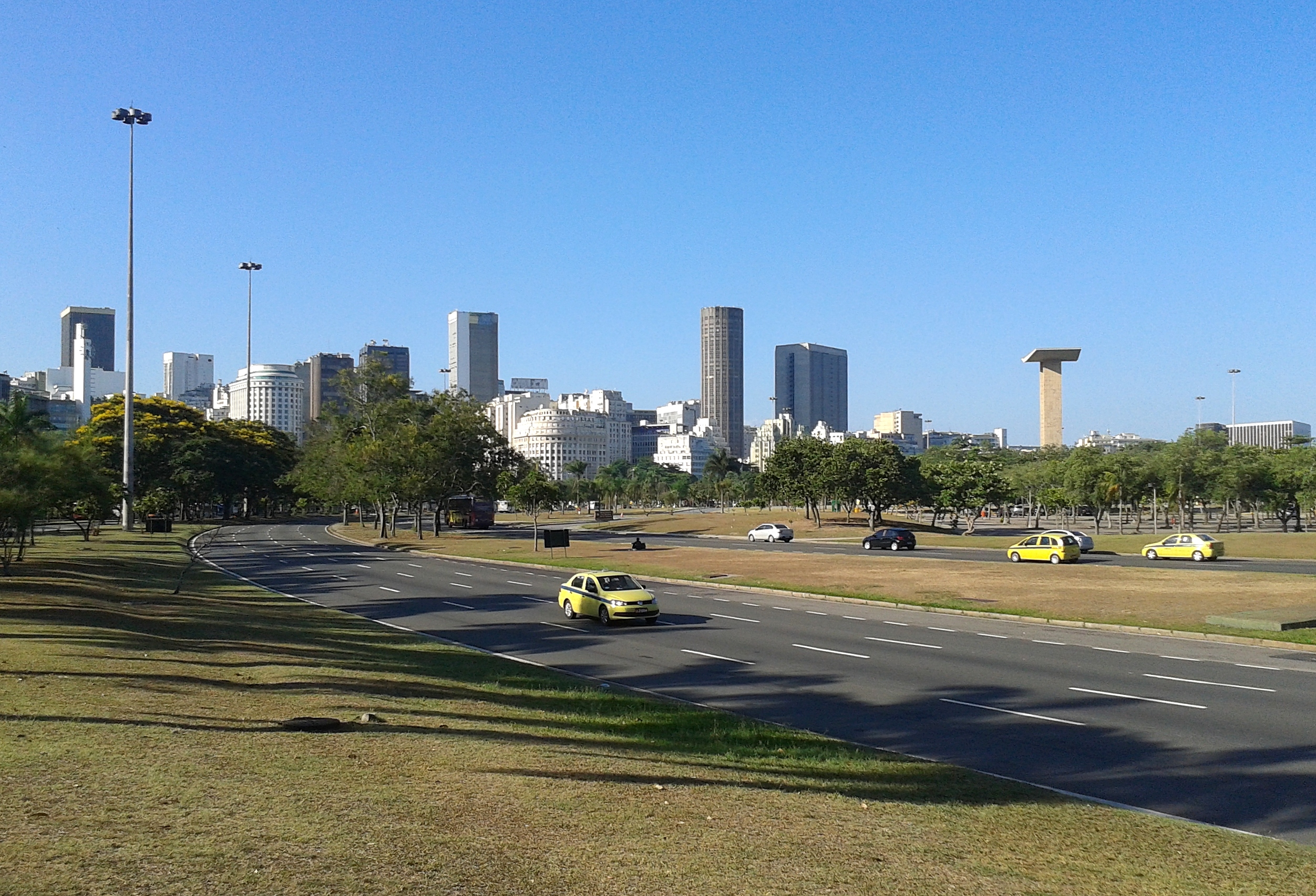
Infante Dom Henrique Avenue

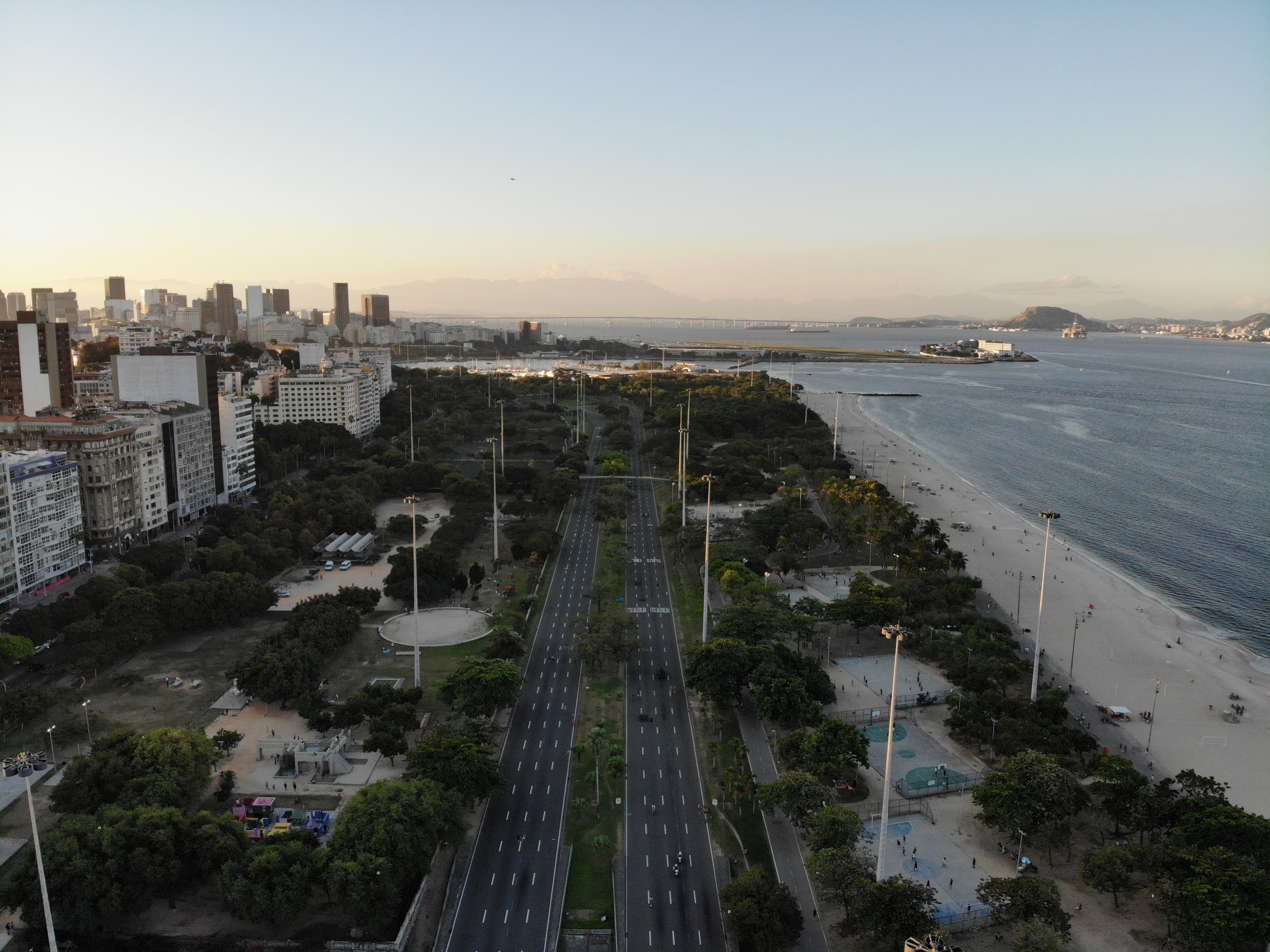
Eduardo Gomes Park in 2018.

Flamengo Park, also known as Aterro do Flamengo, Eduardo Gomes Park, and Aterro do Brigadeiro Eduardo Gomes, is the largest public park and recreation area within the city of Rio de Janeiro, in eastern Brazil, and the largest urban seaside park in the world.

The park is located along Guanabara Bay, in the Flamengo neighborhood of the city, between Downtown Rio and Copacabana.

== Design ==
Flamengo Park was envisioned by Lota de Macedo Soares, while conceived and designed by Affonso Eduardo Reidy with Modernist park gardens and civic landscapes designed by world-renowned landscape designer and artist Roberto Burle Marx. The 296 acres (120 ha) park was completed in 1965.

== Features ==
Flamengo Park is the location of the Rio de Janeiro Museum of Modern Art, the Carmen Miranda Museum, and the Monument to the Dead of World War II with Modernist memorial sculptures.

== Sports ==
Flamengo Park has a strong sports tradition, with many different outdoor recreational facilities available.

Various marathons in the city start and finish in the park. It provides a main segment for Rio's Cycling Race, which is allotted the largest number of points among the Latin American events on the Union Cycliste Internationale (UCI) world ranking.

=== 2007 Pan American Games ===
In the 2007 Pan American Games, Marina da Glória was the main venue for the Rio 2007 Sailing competitions. Also during the Games, the Marathon (men's and women's) arrival points were set up at the Flamengo Park, which also staged the Race Walking and Cycling Road competitions.
