= Pontal =

- Municipality
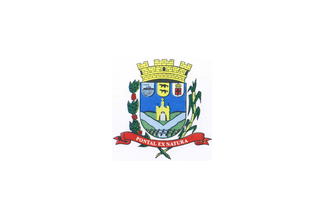
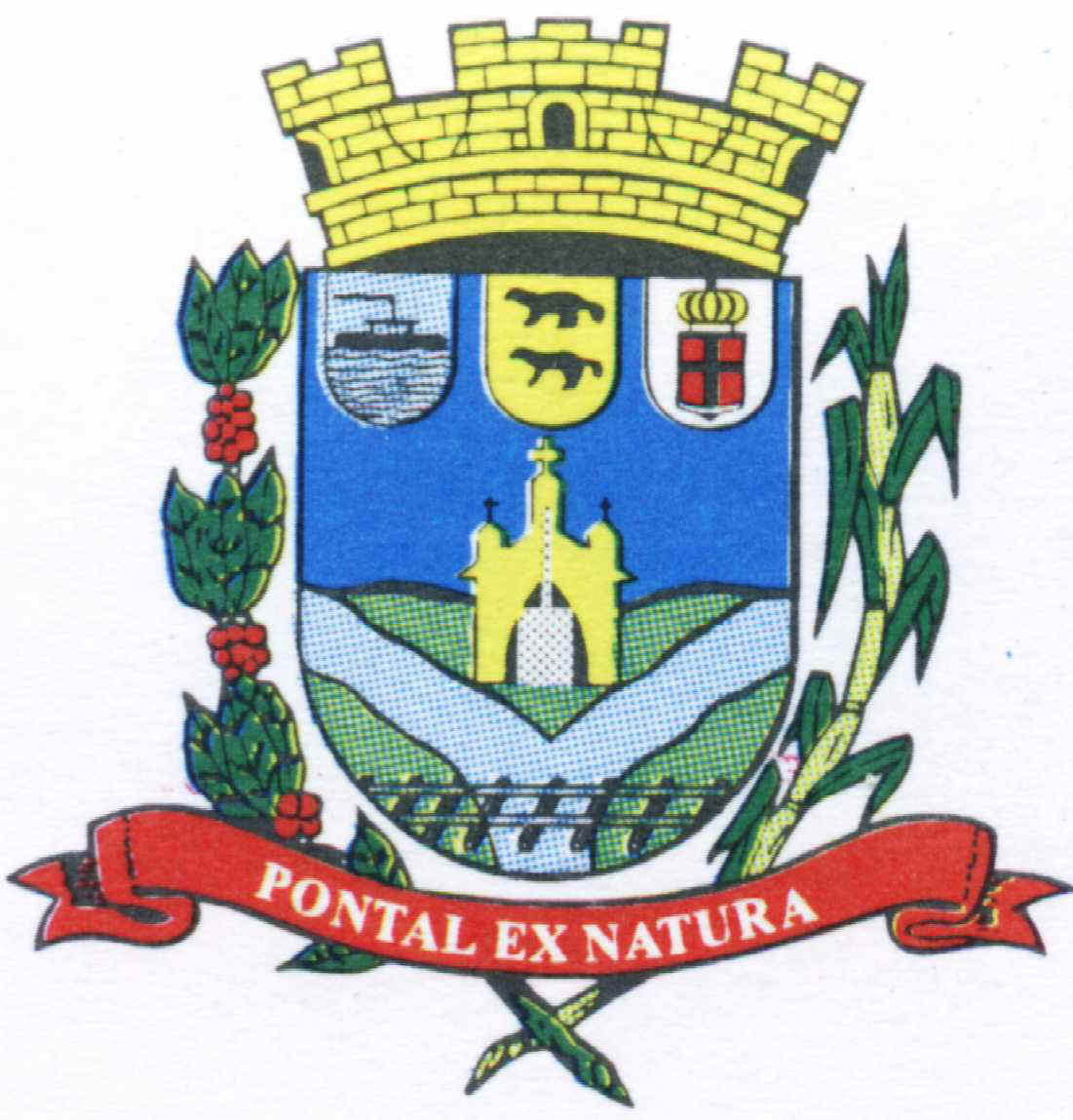
- Flag Coat of arms

- Location in São Paulo state

- Location in Brazil
- Coordinates: 21°1′21″S 48°2′14″W
- Country: Brazil
- Region: Southeast
- State: São Paulo

Area
  - Total: 356 km^{2} (137 sq mi)

Population (2020)
  - Total: 50,852
  - Density: 143/km^{2} (370/sq mi)
- Time zone: UTC−3 (BRT)

Pontal is a municipality in the state of São Paulo in Brazil. The population is 50,852 (2020 est.) in an area of 356 km^{2}. The elevation is 515 m.

== Geography ==
It has an area of 356.320 km².

Pontal borders five other municipalities: Jardinópolis to the east, Sertãozinho to the south, Pitangueiras to the west and Sales de Oliveira and Morro Agudo to the north.

== Media ==
In telecommunications, the city was served by Companhia Telefônica Brasileira until 1973, when it began to be served by Telecomunicações de São Paulo. In July 1998, this company was acquired by Telefónica, which adopted the Vivo brand in 2012.

The company is currently an operator of cell phones, fixed lines, internet (fiber optics/4G) and television (satellite and cable).

== See also ==
- List of municipalities in São Paulo
- Interior of São Paulo
