= 2015 UCI Para-cycling Road World Championships =

- Venue: Nottwil, Switzerland
- Date(s): 29 July–2 August 2015
- Nations participating: 46
- Cyclists participating: 289
- Events: 5

The 2015 UCI Para-cycling Road World Championships were sixth edition of the World Championships for road cycling for athletes with a physical disability. The Championships took place on the roads of Nottwil in Switzerland from 29 July to 2 August 2015. Italy were the most successful team of the competition in number of gold medals won (9), while Germany finished with the greatest total of medals (21).

== Classification ==
Sport class

- Cycling
  - C1 - locomotor disability: Neurological, or amputation
  - C2 - Locomotor disability: Neurological, decrease in muscle strength, or amputation
  - C3 - Locomotor disability: Neurological, or amputation
  - C4 - Locomotor disability: Neurological, or amputation
  - C5 - Locomotor disability: Neurological, or amputation
- Hand cycling
  - H1 - tetraplegics with severe upper limb impairment to the C6 vertebra
  - H2 - Tetraplegics with minor upper limb impairment from C7 thru T3
  - H3 - paraplegics with impairment from T4 thru T10
  - H4 - Paraplegics with impairment from T11 down, and amputees unable to kneel
  - H5 - Athletes who can kneel on a handcycle, a category that includes paraplegics and amputees
- Tricycle
  - T1 - Severe locomotor dysfunction
  - T2 - Moderate loss of stability and function
- Tandem
  - Tandem B - Visual impairment

== Event winners ==
Event	Class	Gold		Silver		Bronze	
Men's events
21km time trial	C1	Michael Teuber; Germany	32:32.60	Juan José Méndez Fernández; Spain	33:50.25	Giancarlo Masini; Italy	33:52.14
21km time trial	C2	Arslan Gilmutdinov; Russia	31:08.44	Liang Guihua; China	31:48.78	Israel Hilario Rimas; Peru	31:56.93
31km time trial	C3	Eoghan Clifford; Ireland	48:53.60	Steffen Warias; Germany	49:41.51	Sergey Ustinov; Russia	50:44.70
31km time trial	C4	Kyle Bridgwood; Australia	46:28.32	Sergey Pudov; Russia	46:49.26	Patrik Kuril; Slovakia	47:36.12
31km time trial	C5	Yegor Dementyev; Ukraine	45:25.45	Alistair Donohoe; Australia	45:51.90	Andrea Tarlao; Italy	46:30.91
31km time trial	Tandem B	Marcin Polak; Michał Ładosz (pilot); Poland	43:34.44	Carlos Gonzalez Garcia; Noel Martin Infante (pilot); Spain	44:45.44	Emanuele Bersini; Riccardo Panizza (pilot); Italy	46:00.91
14km time trial	T1	Quentin Aubague; France	30:15	Sergey Semochkin; Russia	31:29	Jiri Hindr; Czech Republic	32:01
14km time trial	T2	Hans-Peter Durst; Germany	25:00.82	Giorgio Farroni; Italy	26:20.60	Ryan Boyle; United States	26:23.87
14km time trial	H1	Nicolas Pieter du Preez; South Africa	41:59.74	Timothy Williams; New Zealand	44:35.82	Benjamin Frueh; Switzerland	44:52.20
14km time trial	H2	Luca Mazzone; Italy	27:57.34	William Groulx; United States	28:19.52	Tobias Fankhauser; Switzerland	29:48.62
15.5km time trial	H3	Vittorio Podesta; Italy	30:15.89	Heinz Frei; Switzerland	30:43.64	Lukas Weber; Switzerland	31:00.39
15.5km time trial	H4	Rafal Wilk; Poland	28:55.15	Vico Merklein; Germany	29:36.93	Thomas Fruehwirth; Austria	29:52.46
15.5km time trial	H5	Alessandro Zanardi; Italy	28:29.12	Oscar Sanchez; United States	29:08.81	Ernst van Dyk; South Africa	29:21.46
56km Road race	C1	Pierre Senska; Germany	1:30:48	Michael Teuber; Germany	+ 00:00:00	Erich Winkler; Germany	+ 00:00:00
56km Road race	C2	Israel Hilario Rimas; Peru	1:29:04	Maurice Eckhard Tio; Spain	+ 00:01:25	Ivo Koblasa; Czech Republic	+ 00:01:42
56km Road race	C3	Masaki Fujita; Japan	1:27:34	Alexsey Obydennov; Russia	+ 00:01:24	Eduardo Santas Asensio; Spain	+ 00:01:24
77.5km Road race	C4	Patrik Kuril; Slovakia	2:00:58	Carol-Eduard Novak; Romania	+ 00:00:27	Sergey Pudov; Russia	+ 00:03:04
77.5km Road race	C5	Alistair Donohoe; Australia	2:00:55	Yegor Dementyev; Ukraine	+ 00:00:00	Andrea Tarlao; Italy	+ 00:00:00
35km Road race	H1	Nicolas Pieter du Preez; South Africa	1:25:57	Timothy Williams; New Zealand	+ 00:07:35	Teppo Polvi; Finland	+ 00:08:38
49km Road race	H2	Luca Mazzone; Italy	1:30:05	William Groulx; United States	+ 00:01:11	Anders Backman; Sweden	+ 00:04:51
62km Road race	H3	Vittorio Podesta; Italy	01:33:30	Heinz Frei; Switzerland	+ 00:03:17	Lukas Weber; Switzerland	+ 00:04:29
62km Road race	H4	Rafal Wilk; Poland	01:32:40	Vico Merklein; Germany	+ 00:00:49	Mathieu Bosredon; France	+ 00:02:13
62km Road race	H5	Alessandro Zanardi; Italy	01:29:21	Jetze Plat; Netherlands	+ 00:00:00	Johan Reekers; Netherlands	+ 00:00:33
21km Road race	T1	Quentin Aubague; France	00:47:49	Jiri Hindr; Czech Republic	+ 00:01:55	Sergey Semochkin; Russia	+ 00:02:40
28km Road race	T2	Hans-Peter Durst; Germany	00:52:28	Néstor Javier Ayala; Colombia	+ 00:00:00	Ryan Boyle; United States	+ 00:01:00
108.5km Road race	Tandem B	Ignacio Avila Rodriguez; Joan Font Bertoli (pilot); Spain	2:48.33	Vincent Ter Schure; Timo Franssen (pilot); Netherlands	+ 00:00:00	Carlos Gonzalez Garcia; Noel Martin Infante (pilot); Spain	+ 00:01:59
Women's events
14km time trial	T1	Shelley Gautier; Canada	36:32.87	Yulia Sibagatova; Russia	38:54.56	Svetlana Perova; Russia	45:05.82
14km time trial	T2	Carol Cooke; Australia	28:05.80	Jil Walsh; United States	29:25.50	Jana Majunke; Germany	30:00.75
14km time trial	H1	Emilie Miller; Australia	47:33.76				
14km time trial	H2	Justine Asher; South Africa	37:35.51	Carmen Koedood; Netherlands	54:08.16	Mikyoung Jeon; South Korea	58:15.49
14km time trial	H3	Francesca Porcellato; Italy	27:53.94	Alicia Dana; United States	29:11.21	Renata Kaluza; Poland	29:57.36
14km time trial	H4	Svetlana Moshkovich; Russia	27:46.54	Christiane Reppe; Germany	28:00.50	Sandra Graf; Switzerland	29:47.74
14km time trial	H5	Laura de Vaan; Netherlands	24:58.43	Andrea Eskau; Germany	25:06.61	Dorothee Vieth; Germany	25:37.53
14km time trial	C1	Li Jieli; China	29:37.80				
14km time trial	C2	Zeng Sini; China	24:25.69	Allison Jones; United States	25:10.89	Tereza Diepolova; Czech Republic	25:49.60
14km time trial	C3	Jamie Whitmore Cardenas; United States	23:13.26	Denise Schindler; Germany	24:22.57	Simone Kennedy; Australia	25:35.81
21km time trial	C4	Shawn Morelli; United States	34:29.11	Alexandra Green; Australia	35:13.29	Megan Fisher; United States	35:24.17
21km time trial	C5	Sarah Storey; Great Britain	30:52.36	Anna Harkowska; Poland	33:08.17	Kerstin Brachtendorf; Germany	34:14.78
31km time trial	Tandem B	Iwona Podkoscielna; Aleksandra Wnuczek (pilot); Poland	52:05.61	Emma Foy; Laura Thompson (pilot); New Zealand	52:05.64	Odette van Deudekom; Kim van Dijk (pilot); Netherlands	53:03.36
21km Road race	H1	Emilie Miller; Australia	1:36:06				
35km Road race	H2	Justine Asher; South Africa	1:21:35	Carmen Koedood; Netherlands	-1 lap	Mikyoung Jeon; South Korea	-1 lap
42km Road race	H3	Francesca Porcellato; Italy	1:13:16	Alicia Dana; United States	+ 00:02:01	Renata Kaluza; Poland	+ 00:04:15
49km Road race	H4	Christiane Reppe; Germany	1:28:58	Silke Pan; Germany	+ 00:03:18	Sandra Graf; Switzerland	+ 00:07:21
49km Road race	H5	Andrea Eskau; Germany	1:22:26	Laura de Vaan; Netherlands	+ 00:00:06	Oksana Masters; United States	+ 00:00:10
49km Road race	C1	Li Jieli; China	01:42:26				
49km Road race	C2	Zeng Sini; China	01:29:33	Daniela Munévar; Colombia	+ 00:01:11	Allison Jones; United States	+ 00:01:34
49km Road race	C3	Jamie Whitmore; United States	01:29:32	Denise Schindler; Germany	+ 00:01:07	Simone Kennedy; Australia	+ 00:08:24
62km Road race	C4	Shawn Morelli; United States	02:01:06	Susan Powell; Australia	+ 00:04:08	Jenny Narcisi; Italy	+ 00:04:23
62km Road race	C5	Sarah Storey; Great Britain	1:44:45	Anna Harkowska; Poland	+ 00:08:24	Kerstin Brachtendorf; Germany	+ 00:09:01
21km Road race	T1	Shelley Gautier; Canada	57:06	Yulia Sibagatova; Russia	+ 00:03:57	Svetlana Perova; Russia	+ 00:13:16
28km Road race	T2	Jill Walsh; United States	00:58:52	Carol Cooke; Australia	+ 00:00:06	Jana Majunke; Germany	+ 00:02:06
77.5km Road race	Tandem B	Iwona Podkoscielna; Aleksandra Wnuczek (pilot); Poland	2:19:11	Emma Foy; Laura Thompson (pilot); New Zealand	+ 00:00:11	Odette van Deudekom; Kim van Dijk (pilot); Netherlands	+ 00:05:53
Mixed events
Team Relay	H1-5	Vittorio Podesta; Luca Mazzone; Alessandro Zanardi; Italy	31:13	William Lachenauer; William Groulx; Oscar Sanchez; United States	32:24	Jean-Marc Berset; Tobias Fankhauser; Heinz Frei; Switzerland	32:45

== Medal table ==
Rank	Nation	Gold	Silver	Bronze	Total
1	Italy (ITA)	9	1	5	15
2	Germany (GER)	6	9	6	21
3	United States (USA)	5	8	5	18
4	Poland (POL)	5	2	2	9
5	South Africa (RSA)	4	0	1	5
6	Australia (AUS)	3	4	2	9
7	Russia (RUS)	2	5	5	12
8	China (CHN)	2	1	0	3
9	France (FRA)	2	0	1	3
10	Canada (CAN)	2	0	0	2
10	Great Britain (GBR)	2	0	0	2
12	Netherlands (NED)	1	5	3	9
13	Spain (ESP)	1	3	2	6
14	Ukraine (UKR)	1	1	0	2
15	Peru (PER)	1	0	1	2
15	Slovakia (SVK)	1	0	1	2
17	Ireland (IRL)	1	0	0	1
17	Japan (JPN)	1	0	0	1
19	New Zealand (NZL)	0	4	0	4
20	Switzerland (SUI)	0	2	7	9
21	Colombia (COL)	0	2	0	2
22	Czech Republic (CZE)	0	1	3	4
23	Romania (ROM)	0	1	0	1
24	Austria (AUT)	0	0	1	1
24	Finland (FIN)	0	0	1	1
24	Sweden (SWE)	0	0	1	1
Totals (26 entries)		49	49	47	145

== Participating nations ==
32 nations participated.

- Australia
- Austria
- Belgium
- Brazil
- Canada
- China
- Colombia
- Costa Rica
- Croatia
- Czech Republic
- Denmark
- Estonia
- Finland
- France
- Germany
- Great Britain
- Greece
- Haiti
- Hungary
- Iceland
- Ireland
- Israel
- Italy
- Japan
- Luxembourg
- Malaysia
- Montenegro
- Netherlands
- New Zealand
- Norway
- Peru
- Poland
- Portugal
- Romania
- Russia
- Slovakia
- Slovenia
- South Africa
- South Korea
- Spain
- Sweden
- Switzerland
- Ukraine
- United Arab Emirates
- United States
- Venezuela
