= Cycling at the 2012 Summer Paralympics – Mixed road race =

Cycling, Mixed road race T1-2 at the XIV Paralympic Games
- Venue: Brands Hatch
- Dates: September 6-8, 2012
- Competitors: 19 from 16 nations

Medalists
1st place, gold medalist(s)		David Stone	Great Britain
2nd place, silver medalist(s)		Giorgio Farroni	Italy
3rd place, bronze medalist(s)		David Vondracek	Czech Republic

The Mixed road race T1-2 cycling event at the 2012 Summer Paralympics took place on September 8 at Brands Hatch. Nineteen riders from sixteen nations competed. The race distance was 24 km. Results were not factored.

== Results ==
DNF = Did Not Finish. DNS = Did Not Start. LAP=Lapped (8 km).

Rank	Name	Country	Class	Time
1st place, gold medalist(s)	David Stone	Great Britain	T2-M	45:17
2nd place, silver medalist(s)	Giorgio Farroni	Italy	T2-M	45:24
3rd place, bronze medalist(s)	David Vondracek	Czech Republic	T2-M	48:34
4	Gerhard Viljoen	South Africa	T2-M	48:37
5	Steven Peace	United States	T2-M	49:16
6	Helmut Winterleitner	Austria	T2-M	50:04
7	Carol Cooke	Australia	T2-W	51:22
8	Stamatios Kotzias	Greece	T2-M	54:10
9	Quentin Aubague	France	T1-M	58:12
10	Madre Carinus	South Africa	T2-W	1:00:00
11	Lenka Kadetova	Czech Republic	T2-W	1:03:21
12	Mario Alilovic	Croatia	T1-M	1:07:44
13	Aitor Oroza Flores	Spain	T1-M	1:07:57
	Shelley Gautier	Canada	T1-W	LAP
	Simona Matickova	Slovakia	T1-W	LAP
	Nestor Ayala Ayala	Colombia	T2-M	DNF
	Hans-Peter Durst	Germany	T2-M	DNF
	Alan Schmidt	Denmark	T1-M	DNF
	Marie-Eve Croteau	Canada	T2-W	DNS
