= Cycling at the 2016 Summer Paralympics – Men's road time trial T1–2 =

Cycling, Men's road time trial T1-2 at the XV Paralympic Games
- Venue: Flamengo Park
- Dates: 14 September
- Competitors: 12

Medalists
1st place, gold medalist(s)		Hans-Peter Durst	Germany
2nd place, silver medalist(s)		Ryan Boyle	United States
3rd place, bronze medalist(s)		David Stone	Great Britain

The Men's time trial T1-2 road cycling event at the 2016 Summer Paralympics took place on 14 September at Flamengo Park, Pontal. Eight riders from seven nations competed.

The T1 category and T2 category for tricycle classifications for cyclists with balance impairments. As a joined category, the times are factored to produce a final 'time'.

== Results : Men's road time trial T1-2 ==
Rank	Name	Nationality	Time	Factor (%)	Final Time
1st place, gold medalist(s)	Hans-Peter Durst	Germany	22:57.34	100	22:57.34
2nd place, silver medalist(s)	Ryan Boyle	United States	24:21.35	100	24:21.35
3rd place, bronze medalist(s)	David Stone	Great Britain	24:42.25	100	24:42.25
4	Quentin Aubague	France	30:37.62	82.35	25:13.28
5	Rickard Nilsson	Sweden	30:51.25	82.35	25:24.50
6	Jiri Hindr	Czech Republic	31:05.61	82.35	25:36.33
7	Nestor Ayala Ayala	Colombia	26:09.88	100	26:09.88
8	Stephen Hills	New Zealand	26:23.64	100	26:23.64
9	Goldy Fuchs	South Africa	26:42.02	100	26:42.02
10	Tim Celen	Belgium	27:03.03	100	27:03.03
11	Giorgio Farroni	Italy	27:04.08	100	27:04.08
12	David Vondracek	Czech Republic	27:11.30	100	27:11.30
