= Cycling at the 2012 Summer Paralympics – Mixed road time trial =

Paralympic cycling event

Cycling, mixed road time trial T1-2 at the XIV Paralympic Games
- Venue: Brands Hatch
- Dates: September 5, 2012
- Competitors: 19 from 16 nations

Medalists
1st place, gold medalist(s)		Carol Cooke	Australia
2nd place, silver medalist(s)		Hans-Peter Durst	Germany
3rd place, bronze medalist(s)		David Stone	Great Britain

The Mixed time trial T1-2 road cycling event at the 2012 Summer Paralympics took place on September 5 at Brands Hatch. Nineteen riders from sixteen nations competed. The race distance was 8 km.

== Results ==
Rank	Name	Country	Class and gender	Race time	Factor	Final time
1st place, gold medalist(s)	Carol Cooke	Australia	T2-W	15:58.39	86.66	13:50.54
2nd place, silver medalist(s)	Hans-Peter Durst	Germany	T2-M	14:11.95	100.00	14:11.95
3rd place, bronze medalist(s)	David Stone	Great Britain	T2-M	14:25.66	100.00	14:25.66
4	Quentin Aubague	France	T1-M	17:24.19	83.41	14:30.96
5	Giorgio Farroni	Italy	T2-M	14:50.49	100.00	14:50.49
6	Nestor Ayala Ayala	Colombia	T2-M	15:00.81	100.00	15:00.81
7	Gerhard Viljoen	South Africa	T2-M	15:26.41	100.00	15:26.41
8	David Vondracek	Czech Republic	T2-M	15:52.29	100.00	15:52.29
9	Steven Peace	United States	T2-M	15:57.69	100.00	15:57.69
10	Helmut Winterleitner	Austria	T2-M	16:17.65	100.00	16:17.65
11	Shelley Gautier	Canada	T1-W	23:18.19	72.28	16:50.61
12	Madre Carinus	South Africa	T2-W	19:30.28	86.66	16:54.16
13	Lenka Kadetova	Czech Republic	T2-W	19:31.60	86.66	16:55.30
14	Mario Alilovic	Croatia	T1-M	20:45.10	83.41	17:18.53
15	Aitor Oroza Flores	Spain	T1-M	20:55.11	83.41	17:26.88
16	Stamatios Kotzias	Greece	T2-M	18:11.90	100.00	18:11.90
17	Alan Schmidt	Denmark	T1-M	22:29.68	83.41	18:45.77
18	Simona Matickova	Slovakia	T1-W	32:38.41	72.28	23:35.54
	Marie-Eve Croteau	Canada	T2-W			DNS
