= Cycling at the 2016 Summer Paralympics – Men's road race T1–2 =

Cycling, Men's road race T1-2 at the XV Paralympic Games
- Venue: Pontal, Rio
- Dates: September 17

The men's road race T1-2 cycling event at the 2016 Summer Paralympics took place on September 17 at Pontal, Rio. The race distance was 60 km.

== Results : Men's road race T1-2 ==
Rank	Name	Nationality	Classification	Time	Deficit
1st place, gold medalist(s)	Hans-Peter Durst	Germany	T2	02:57:00	0
2nd place, silver medalist(s)	David Stone	Great Britain	T2	03:00:00	3
3rd place, bronze medalist(s)	Néstor Javier Ayala	Colombia	T2	s.t.	s.t.
4	Ryan Boyle	United States	T2	03:16:00	19
5	Giorgio Farroni	Italy	T2	03:52:00	55
6	Tim Celen	Belgium	T2	06:23:00	03:26:00
7	David Vondracek	Czech Republic	T2	s.t.	s.t.
8	Stephen Hills	New Zealand	T2	s.t.	s.t.
9	Goldy Fuchs	South Africa	T2	09:13:00	06:16:00
10	Quentin Aubague	France	T1	01:06:26	15:29:00
11	Rickard Nilsson	Sweden	T1	01:07:34	16:37:00
12	Jiri Hindr	Czech Republic	T1	01:07:38	16:41:00
