= Austria at the 2020 Summer Paralympics =

- IPC code: AUT
- NPC: Austrian Paralympic Committee
- Website: www.oepc.at (in German)

in Tokyo
- Competitors: 25 in 8 sports
- Medals: Gold 1 Silver 5 Bronze 3 Total 9

Summer Paralympics appearances (overview)
- 1960; 1964; 1968; 1972; 1976; 1980; 1984; 1988; 1992; 1996; 2000; 2004; 2008; 2012; 2016; 2020; 2024

Austria competed at the 2020 Summer Paralympics in Tokyo, Japan, from 24 August to 5 September 2021. The Austrian delegation consisted of seven athletes, six men and one woman. The delegation won nine medals, one gold, five silver, and three bronze, placing 48th.

== Background ==
Originally scheduled to take place in Tokyo, Japan from 24 July to 9 August 2020, the Games were postponed due to the COVID-19 pandemic. They were eventually played in Tokyo from 24 August through 5 September 2021.

=== Delegation ===
The Austrian delegation consisted of 25 athletes, 18 men and seven woman.

Sport	Men	Women	Total	Ref.
Athletics	2	1	3	
Canoeing	1	0	1	
Cycling	4	2	6	
Equestrian	2	2	4	
Swimming	2	1	3	
Table Tennis	1	0	1	
Triathlon	2	0	2	
Wheelchair Tennis	4	0	4	
Total	18	7	25	

== Medalists ==
The Austrian delegation won nine medals, one gold, five silver, and three bronze, finishing in a joint 65th place in the medal table alongside the delegations of Kuwait, Namibia, and Slovenia.

Medal	Name	Sport	Event	Date
Gold	Walter Ablinger	Cycling	Men's road time trial H4	31 August
Silver	Pepo Puch	Equestrian	Individual championship test grade II	26 August
Silver	Florian Brungraber	Paratriathlon	Men's PTWC	29 August
Silver	Pepo Puch	Equestrian	Individual freestyle test grade II	30 August
Silver	Thomas Frühwirth	Cycling	Men's road time trial H4	31 August
Silver	Thomas Frühwirth	Cycling	Men's road race H4	1 September
Bronze	Alexander Gritsch	Cycling	Men's road time trial H4	31 August
Bronze	Alexander Gritsch	Cycling	Men's road race H4	1 September
Bronze	Walter Ablinger	Cycling	Men's road race H4	1 September

== Athletics ==
Men's track

Thomas Geierspichler participated in the men's track events. He has represented Austria at every paralympics since the 2000 games at Sydney. Geierspichler did not win a medal.

Athlete	Event	Heats		Final		Ref.
Athlete	Event	Result	Rank	Result	Rank	Ref.
Thomas Geierspichler	400m T52	1:04.22	5 q	1:02.68	6	
Thomas Geierspichler	1500m T52	—N/a		3:54.77	4	

Men's field

Athlete	Event	Final		Ref.
Athlete	Event	Result	Rank	Ref.
Bil Marinkovic	Discus throw F11	33.45	5	

Women's field

Athlete	Event	Final		Ref.
Athlete	Event	Result	Rank	Ref.
Natalija Eder	Javelin throw F13	37.92	4	
Natalija Eder	Shot put F12	11.45	7	

== Cycling ==
Walter Ablinger, Thomas Frühwirth, Ernst Bachmaier, Elisabeth Egger, Alexander Gritsch, Yvonne Marzinke all qualified to compete.

=== Road ===
Men's road

Athlete	Event	Time	Rank	Ref.
Walter Ablinger	Road race H3	2:35:06	3rd place, bronze medalist(s)	
Walter Ablinger	Time trial H3	43:39.17	1st place, gold medalist(s)	
Ernst Bachmaier	Road race H1–2	did not start		
Ernst Bachmaier	Time trial H1	did not finish		
Thomas Frühwirth	Road race H4	2:20:56	2nd place, silver medalist(s)	
Thomas Frühwirth	Time trial H4	38:30.61	2nd place, silver medalist(s)	
Alexander Gritsch	Road race H4	2:22:38	3rd place, bronze medalist(s)	
Alexander Gritsch	Time trial H4	39:58.93	3rd place, bronze medalist(s)	

Women's road

Athlete	Event	Time	Rank	Ref.
Elisabeth Egger	Road race H1–4	did not finish		
Elisabeth Egger	Time trial H1–3	46:02.84	10	
Yvonne Marzinke	Road race C1–3	1:25:42	14	
Yvonne Marzinke	Time trial C1–3	30:35.19	13	

=== Track ===
Women's track

Athlete	Event	Qualification		Final		Ref.
Athlete	Event	Time	Rank	Opposition Time	Rank	Ref.
Yvonne Marzinke	Individual pursuit C1–3	4:29.147	13	did not advance		
Yvonne Marzinke	Time trial C1–3	—N/a		42.023	8	

== Equestrian ==
Athlete	Event	Score	Rank	Ref.
Bernd Brugger	Individual championship test grade IV	66.903	11	
Pepo Puch	Individual championship test grade II	73.441	2nd place, silver medalist(s)	
Pepo Puch	Individual freestyle test grade II	81.007	2nd place, silver medalist(s)	
Julia Sciancalepore	Individual championship test grade I	70.571	7	
Valentina Strobl	Individual championship test grade V	64.381	13	
Bernd Brugger; Pepo Puch; Julia Sciancelapore	Team	213.502	9	

== Paracanoeing ==
Austria sent a single athlete, Markus Swoboda, to compete in Paracanoeing.

Athlete	Event	Heats		Semifinals		Final		Ref.
Athlete	Event	Time	Rank	Time	Rank	Time	Rank	Ref.
Markus Swoboda	Men's KL2	49.465	7	42.697	2 FA	43.090	5	
Markus Swoboda	Men's VL3	DSQ		Did not advance				

== Paratriathlon ==
Florian Brungraber and former sprinter Günther Matzinger qualified to compete.

Athlete	Event	Swim	Trans 1	Bike	Trans 2	Run	Total Time	Rank
Florian Brungraber	Men's PTWC	13:35	1:23	41:59	0:54	12:04	59:55	2nd place, silver medalist(s)
Günther Matzinger	Men's PTS5	12:21	1:08	21:05	0:48	17:31	1:02:53	9

== Swimming ==
Andreas Ernhofer, Janina Falk, Andreas Onea have qualified to compete.

Men

Athlete	Event	Heats		Final	
Athlete	Event	Result	Rank	Result	Rank
Andreas Ernhofer	50m freestyle S4	45.10	15	did not advance	
Andreas Ernhofer	100m freestyle S4	1:38.49	11	did not advance	
Andreas Ernhofer	200m freestyle S4	3:39.44	14	did not advance	
Andreas Ernhofer	50m backstroke S4	50.18	12	did not advance	
Andreas Ernhofer	50m breaststroke SB3	54.18	7 Q	55.00	8
Andreas Ernhofer	150m individual medley SM4	2:51.58	10	did not advance	
Andreas Onea	100m breaststroke SB8	1:13.90	10	did not advance	
Andreas Onea	100m butterfly S8	1:09.52	15	did not advance	
Andreas Onea	200m individual medley SM8	2:31.03	9	did not advance	

Women

Athlete	Event	Heats		Final	
Athlete	Event	Result	Rank	Result	Rank
Janina Falk	200m freestyle S14	2:20.39	10	did not advance	
Janina Falk	100m backstroke S14	1:19.44	14	did not advance	
Janina Falk	100m breaststroke SB14	1:28.68	14	did not advance	
Janina Falk	100m butterfly S14	1:13.62	14	did not advance	
Janina Falk	200m individual medley SM14	2:37.51	9	did not advance	

== Table tennis ==
Austria entered one athletes into the table tennis competition at the games. Krisztian Gardos qualified via World Ranking allocation.

Men

Athlete	Event	Group Stage				Quarterfinals	Semifinals	Final	
Athlete	Event	Opposition Result	Opposition Result	Opposition Result	Rank	Opposition Result	Opposition Result	Opposition Result	Rank
Krisztian Gardos	Individual C10	Cogill (RSA); W 11–5, 11–9, 11-7	Bohéas (FRA); L 13–11, 11–13, 4–11, 3-11	Carbinatti Junior (BRA); W 6–11, 11–9, 11–5, 11-9	2 Q	Radovic (MNE); L 8–11, 8–11, 14–12, 8-11	did not advance		

== Wheelchair tennis ==
The Austrian delegation sent four male athletes, none of whom made it past the first round.

Athlete	Event	Round of 64	Round of 32	Round of 16	Quarterfinals	Semifinals	Final / BM		Ref.
Athlete	Event	Opposition Result	Opposition Result	Opposition Result	Opposition Result	Opposition Result	Opposition Result	Rank	Ref.
Thomas Flax	Men's singles	Maripa (RSA); L 2–6, 0-6	ss						
Nico Langmann	Men's singles	Vandorpe (BEL); L 4–6, 1-6	did not advance						
Martin Legner	Men's singles	Ji (CHN); L 1–6, 0-6	did not advance						
Josef Riegler	Men's singles	Spaargaren (NED); L 0–6, 0-6	did not advance						

== See also ==
- Austria at the Paralympics
- Austria at the 2020 Summer Olympics
