= Cycling at the 2016 Summer Paralympics – Men's road time trial H4 =

Cycling, men's road time trial H4 at the XV Paralympic Games
- Venue: Flamengo Park
- Dates: 14 September
- Competitors: 12 from 9 nations

Medalists
1st place, gold medalist(s)		Rafał Wilk	Poland
2nd place, silver medalist(s)		Thomas Fruhwirth	Austria
3rd place, bronze medalist(s)		Vico Merklein	Germany

The Men's time trial H4 road cycling event at the 2016 Summer Paralympics took place on 14 September at Flamengo Park, Pontal. Twelve riders from nine nations competed.

The H4 category is a handcycle class is for cyclists with lower limb disabilities and neurological dysfunction.

== Results : Men's road time trial H4 ==
Rank	Name	Nationality	Time	Deficit	Avg. Speed
1st place, gold medalist(s)	Rafał Wilk	Poland	27:39.31	0	43.392
2nd place, silver medalist(s)	Thomas Fruhwirth	Austria	27:49.31	+0:10.00	43.132
3rd place, bronze medalist(s)	Vico Merklein	Germany	28:42.34	+1:03.03	41.804
4	Kim Kluver Christiansen	Denmark	28:55.71	+1:16.40	41.482
5	Thomas Davis	United States	29:25.71	+1:46.40	40.777
6	Joel Jeannot	France	29:40.19	+2:00.88	40.445
7	Mathieu Bosredon	France	29:53.76	+2:14.45	40.139
8	Arkadiusz Skrzypinski	Poland	30:12.01	+2:32.70	39.735
9	Michael Jorgensen	Denmark	30:12.53	+2:33.22	39.723
10	Jonas Van De Steene	Belgium	30:32.66	+2:53.35	39.287
11	Joel Wagener	Luxembourg	31:59.40	+4:20.09	37.512
12	Felix Frohofer	Switzerland	32:37.01	+4:58.30	-
