= Cycling at the 2020 Summer Paralympics – Men's road race H4 =

Men's road race H4 at the XVI Paralympic Games
- Venue: Fuji Speedway
- Dates: 1 September
- Competitors: 10 from 12 nations
- Winning time: 2:15:13

Medalists
1st place, gold medalist(s)		Jetze Plat	Netherlands
2nd place, silver medalist(s)		Thomas Frühwirth	Austria
3rd place, bronze medalist(s)		Alexander Gritsch	Austria

The men's road race H4 cycling event at the 2020 Summer Paralympics took place on 1 September 2021, at the Fuji Speedway in Tokyo. 10 riders competed in the event.

The H4 classification is for paraplegics with impairment from T11 down, and amputees unable to knee. These riders will operate using a hand-operated cycle.

== Results ==
The event took place on 1 September 2021, at 14:15:

Rank	Rider	Nationality	Time	Deficit
1st place, gold medalist(s)	Jetze Plat	Netherlands	2:15:13	
2nd place, silver medalist(s)	Thomas Frühwirth	Austria	2:20:56	+5:43
3rd place, bronze medalist(s)	Alexander Gritsch	Austria	2:22:38	+7:25
4	Jonas Van de Steene	Belgium	2:23:54	+8:41
5	David Thomas	United States	2:31:47	+16:34
6	Grant Allen	Australia	2:33:31	+18:18
7	Fabian Recher	Switzerland	2:33:31	+18:18
8	Krystian Giera	Poland	2:34:30	+19:17
9	Kim Christiansen	Denmark	-1 Lap	
10	Yoon Yeo-keun	South Korea	-1 Lap	
	Rafał Wilk	Poland	DNF	
	Bernd Jeffré	Germany	DNF	
