= Austria at the 2016 Summer Paralympics =

- IPC code: AUT
- NPC: Austrian Paralympic Committee
- Website: www.oepc.at (in German)

in Rio de Janeiro
- Competitors: 26 in 9 sports
- Flag bearer: Wolfgang Eibeck
- Medals Ranked 50th: Gold 1 Silver 4 Bronze 4 Total 9

Summer Paralympics appearances (overview)
- 1960; 1964; 1968; 1972; 1976; 1980; 1984; 1988; 1992; 1996; 2000; 2004; 2008; 2012; 2016; 2020; 2024

Austria is competing with 26 athletes at the 2016 Summer Paralympics in Rio de Janeiro, Brazil, from 7 September to 18 September 2016.

== Medalists ==
The following Austrian competitors won medals at the games. In the by discipline sections below, medalists' names are bolded.

Medal	Name	Sport	Event	Date
Gold	Pepo Puch	Equestrian	Individual championship test grade Ib	September 14
Silver	Markus Swoboda	Paracanoeing	Men's KL2	September 15
Silver	Walter Ablinger	Cycling	Men's road time trial H3	September 15
Silver	Thomas Frühwirth	Cycling	Men's road time trial H4	September 15
Silver	Pepo Puch	Equestrian	Individual freestyle test grade Ib	September 16
Bronze	Krisztian Gardos	Table tennis	Men's individual Class 10	September 12
Bronze	Andreas Onea	Swimming	Men's 100 metre breaststroke SB8	September 14
Bronze	Günther Matzinger	Athletics	Men's 400 metres T47	September 17
Bronze	Natalija Eder	Athletics	Women's javelin throw F13	September 17

== Support ==
“Project Rio 2016” was created by the government to support Paralympic athletes seeking to qualify for the Rio Games. The former Austrian Minister of Sport Gerald Klug met with Paralympians Andreas Onea and Sabine Weber-Treiber as part of this program. The current Minister of Sports is Hans Peter Doskozil.

== Disability classifications ==
Every participant at the Paralympics has their disability grouped into one of five disability categories; amputation, the condition may be congenital or sustained through injury or illness; cerebral palsy; wheelchair athletes, there is often overlap between this and other categories; visual impairment, including blindness; Les autres, any physical disability that does not fall strictly under one of the other categories, for example dwarfism or multiple sclerosis. Each Paralympic sport then has its own classifications, dependent upon the specific physical demands of competition. Events are given a code, made of numbers and letters, describing the type of event and classification of the athletes competing. Some sports, such as athletics, divide athletes by both the category and severity of their disabilities, other sports, for example swimming, group competitors from different categories together, the only separation being based on the severity of the disability.

== Athletics ==
Men
Track & road events

Athlete	Event	Heat		Final	
Athlete	Event	Result	Rank	Result	Rank
Mario Bauer	Marathon T46	—N/a		2:58:34	5
Thomas Geierspichler	100 metres T52	19.82	12	did not advance	
Thomas Geierspichler	400 metres T52	1:03.27	9	did not advance	
**Günther Matzinger**	400 metres T47	49.90 **SB**	3 **Q**	48.95 **SB**	3rd place, bronze medalist(s)

Field events

Athlete	Event	Final	
Athlete	Event	Distance	Position
Bil Marinkovic	Discus throw F11	37.22 **SB**	4

Women
Field events

Athlete	Event	Final	
Athlete	Event	Distance	Position
**Natalija Eder**	Javelin throw F13	40.49 **PB**	3rd place, bronze medalist(s)

== Paracanoe ==
Men

Athlete	Event	Heats		Semifinals		Final	
Athlete	Event	Time	Rank	Time	Rank	Time	Rank
**Markus Swoboda**	KL2	44.525	1 **FA**	Bye		43.726	2nd place, silver medalist(s)

== Cycling ==
With one pathway for qualification being one highest ranked NPCs on the UCI Para-Cycling male and female Nations Ranking Lists on 31 December 2014, Austria qualified for the 2016 Summer Paralympics in Rio, assuming they continued to meet all other eligibility requirements.

=== Road ===
Men

Athlete	Event	Time	Rank
**Walter Ablinger**	Road race H3	1:53:29	11
**Walter Ablinger**	Road time trial H3	29:26.01	2nd place, silver medalist(s)
Wolfgang Eibeck	Road race C4–5	2:17:45	8
Wolfgang Eibeck	Road time trial C5	38:15.05	6
**Thomas Frühwirth**	Road race H4	1:28:59	7
**Thomas Frühwirth**	Road time trial H4	27:49.31	2nd place, silver medalist(s)
Wolfgang Schattauer	Road race H2	1:31:39	7
Wolfgang Schattauer	Road time trial H2	37:56.39	7
Walter Ablinger; Thomas Frühwirth; Wolfgang Schattauer	Mixed team relay	35:38	5

=== Track ===
Pursuit

Athlete	Event	Qualification		Final	
Athlete	Event	Time	Rank	Opponent Results	Rank
Wolfgang Eibeck	Men's individual pursuit C5	4:49.644	8	did not advance	

== Equestrian ==
The country qualified to participate in the team event at the Rio Games.

Athlete	Horse	Event	Score	Rank
Thomas Haller	Puschkin 7	Individual championship test grade II	WD	
Michael Knauder	Contessa 15	Individual championship test grade Ia	68.087	14
**Pepo Puch**	Fontainenoir	Individual championship test grade Ib	75.103	1st place, gold medalist(s)
**Pepo Puch**	Fontainenoir	Individual freestyle test grade Ib	76.750	2nd place, silver medalist(s)
Julia Sciancalepore	Pommery 4	Individual championship test grade Ia	66.304	19
Thomas Haller; Michael Knauder; Pepo Puch; Julia Sciancalepore	See above	Team	418.160	8

== Rowing ==
Athlete	Event	Heats		Repechage		Final	
Athlete	Event	Time	Rank	Time	Rank	Time	Rank
Maria Dorn; Thomas Ebner; Gerheid Pahl; Benjamin Strasser	Mixed coxed four	3:47.13	6 **R**	3:58.96	5 **FB**	3:45.98	11

== Sailing ==
One pathway for qualifying for Rio involved having a boat have top seven finish at the 2015 Combined World Championships in a medal event where the country had nor already qualified through via the 2014 IFDS Sailing World Championships. Austria qualified for the 2016 Games under this criterion in the 2.4m event with a ninth-place finish overall and the first country who had not qualified via the 2014 Championships. The boat was crewed by Sven Reiger.

Athlete	Event	Race											Net points	Final rank
Athlete	Event	1	2	3	4	5	6	7	8	9	10	11	Net points	Final rank
Sven Reiger	Norlin Mark 3 / 2.5 metre	8	8	6	5	7	6	11	12	10	~~13~~	13	86	11

== Swimming ==
Swimmers Andreas Onea and Sabine Weber-Treiber were Paralympic swimmers who benefited from the Austrian government's “Project Rio 2016”.

Men

Athlete	Event	Heats		Final	
Athlete	Event	Result	Rank	Result	Rank
**Andreas Onea**	50m freestyle S8	29.49	15	did not advance	
**Andreas Onea**	100m breaststroke SB8	—N/a		1:14.44	3rd place, bronze medalist(s)
**Andreas Onea**	100m butterfly S8	1:04.84	6 **Q**	1:05.23	6
**Andreas Onea**	200m individual medley SM8	2:35.34	9	did not advance	

Women

Athlete	Event	Heats		Final	
Athlete	Event	Result	Rank	Result	Rank
Sabine Weber-Treiber	50m freestyle S6	37.89	10	did not advance	
Sabine Weber-Treiber	100m freestyle S6	1:27.88	16	did not advance	
Sabine Weber-Treiber	100m breaststroke SB5	1:53.73	8 **Q**	DSQ	

== Table tennis ==
Men

Athlete	Event	Group Stage			Round 1	Quarterfinals	Semifinals	Final	
Athlete	Event	Opposition Result	Opposition Result	Rank	Opposition Result	Opposition Result	Opposition Result	Opposition Result	Rank
Egon Kramminger	Individual C3	Feng Pf (CHN); **L** 0–3	Glinbancheun (THA); **L** 0–3	3	did not advance				
Stanislaw Fraczyk	Individual C9	Perez (ESP); **W** 3–2	Thompson (GBR); **W** 3–0	1 **Q**	—N/a	Last (NED); **L** 1–3	did not advance		
**Krisztian Gardos**	Individual C10	Ruiz (ESP); **W** 3–1	Carbinatti (BRA); **W** 3–2	1 **Q**	—N/a	Kodjabashev (BUL); **W** 3–2	Chojnowski (POL); **L** 0–3	Hao L (CHN); **W** 3–0	3rd place, bronze medalist(s)
Stanislaw Fraczyk; Krisztian Gardos	Team C9–10	—N/a			Netherlands; **L** 1–2	did not advance			

Women

Athlete	Event	Group Stage			Round 1	Quarterfinals	Semifinals	Final	
Athlete	Event	Opposition Result	Opposition Result	Rank	Opposition Result	Opposition Result	Opposition Result	Opposition Result	Rank
Doris Mader	Individual C3	Lee M-g (KOR); **L** 0–3	Fontaine (USA); **W** 3–0	2 **Q**	Yoon Jy (KOR); **L** 0–3	did not advance			

== Wheelchair tennis ==
Austria qualified two competitors in the men's single event, Nico Langmann and Martin Legner.

Men

Athlete	Event	Round of 64	Round of 32	Round of 16	Quarterfinals	Semifinals	Final / BM	
Athlete	Event	Opposition Score	Opposition Score	Opposition Score	Opposition Score	Opposition Score	Opposition Score	Rank
Nico Langmann	Singles	Dong S (CHN); **L** 0–6, 3–6	did not advance					
Martin Legner	Singles	Im H-w (KOR); **L** 1–6, 3–6	did not advance					
Nico Langmann; Martin Legner	Doubles	—N/a	Bye	Kunieda / Saida (JPN); **L** 2–6, 0–6	did not advance			

== See also ==
- Austria at the 2016 Summer Olympics
