= Bernd Jeffré =

German paracyclist

Personal information
- Born: 17 March 1964 (age 62) Kiel, Germany

Sport
- Sport: Para-cycling
- Disability class: H3; H4

Achievements and titles
- Paralympic finals: 2012, 2020
- World finals: 2010, 2011, 2014, 2015, 2017, 2018, 2019, 2021
Medal record
Representing Germany
World Marathon Majors
Gold medal – first place	2008 Berlin	Handcycle
Silver medal – second place	2010 Berlin	Handcycle
Paralympic Games
Bronze medal – third place	2012 London	Time trial H3
UCI Para-cycling Road World Championships
Bronze medal – third place	2017 Pietermaritzburg	Team relay
Bronze medal – third place	2019 Emmen	Team relay
Bronze medal – third place	2021 Cascais	Team relay

Bernd Jeffré (born 17 March 1964) is a German paracyclist who won the handcycle race at the 2008 Berlin Marathon. He also won a bronze medal in the road time trial H3 event at the 2012 Summer Paralympics, and has won three team relay bronze medals at the UCI Para-cycling Road World Championships. He competed at the delayed 2020 Summer Paralympics.

== Personal life ==
Jeffré was born in Kiel, Germany. He has paraplegia, after a crane accident at the age of 37. Jeffré is married.

== Career ==
Jeffré started playing wheelchair basketball, and started competing with a handbike in 2004. He trains at the Gymnastik-Club 1965 Nendorf. He won the handcycle race at the 2008 Berlin Marathon, in a course record time of 1:05:44. He was the first person to finish the Berlin Marathon race in under 1:10.00. He came second in the handcycle race at the 2010 Berlin Marathon behind Vico Merklein. Jeffré and Merklein had led the race throughout. Jeffré may have lost the race due to wearing too few clothes and becoming cold during the race. His wife had suggested wearing more clothes, but Jeffré chose to ignore her. He came eighth in the time trial event at the 2010 UCI Para-cycling Road World Championships, and fifth in the road race. At the 2011 Championships, he came eighth in the road race.

At the 2012 Summer Paralympics, Jeffré came third in the road time trial H3 event, and sixth in the road race H3. He was the first Paralympic medallist from Lower Saxony. In 2013, he was a contender for German disabled athlete of the year. At the 2014 UCI Para-cycling Road World Championships, Jeffré came sixth in the time trial. At the 2015 Championships, he came eighth at the same event.

At the 2017 UCI Para-cycling Road World Championships, he was part of the German team that came third in the team relay event, alongside Mariusz Frankowski and Andrea Eskau. He also came fourth in the individual time trial at the Championships. In the same year, he came second in a European Handbike Circuit competition, and second in a handbike marathon event in Rosenau, France. In 2018, he came fifth in the World Championships time trial, sixth in the road race and seventh in the team relay. He won the Road World Cup H4 overall standings for the season. At the 2019 Championships, he came third in the team relay, eighth in the time trial and ninth in the road race. At the 2021 UCI Para-cycling Road World Championships, Jeffré came third in the team relay event, alongside Annika Zeyen and Vico Merklein. He came 13th in the individual road race.

In July 2021, Jeffré was selected for the German team for the delayed 2020 Summer Paralympics. He finished eighth in the time trial H4 event, and did not finish the road race H4 due to a technical problem with his handcycle. He was part of the German team, alongside Zeyen and Merklein, that came fourth in the mixed team relay.
