= Cycling at the 2020 Summer Paralympics – Men's road time trial H4 =

Men's road time trial H4 at the XVI Paralympic Games
- Venue: Fuji Speedway
- Dates: 31 August
- Competitors: 12 from 10 nations
- Winning time: 37:28.92

Medalists
1st place, gold medalist(s)		Jetze Plat	Netherlands
2nd place, silver medalist(s)		Thomas Fruehwirth	Austria
3rd place, bronze medalist(s)		Alexander Gritsch	Austria

The men's time trial H4 road cycling event at the 2020 Summer Paralympics took place on 31 August 2021, at Fuji Speedway, Tokyo. 12 riders competed in the event.

The H4 classification is for paraplegics with impairment from T11 down, and amputees unable to kneel. These riders operate a hand-operated cycle.

== Results ==
The event took place on 31 August 2021, at 9:25:

Rank	Rider	Nationality	Time	Deficit
1st place, gold medalist(s)	Jetze Plat	Netherlands	37:28.92	
2nd place, silver medalist(s)	Thomas Frühwirth	Austria	38:30.61	+1:01.69
3rd place, bronze medalist(s)	Alexander Gritsch	Austria	39:58.93	+2:30.01
4	Rafał Wilk	Poland	40:09.78	+2:40.86
5	Tom Davis	United States	41:14.12	+3:45.20
6	Grant Allen	Australia	41:21.94	+3:53.02
7	Krystian Giera	Poland	42:10.59	+4:41.67
8	Bernd Jeffré	Germany	43:53.61	+6:24.69
9	Jonas van de Steene	Belgium	44:07.03	+6:38.11
10	Kim Christiansen	Denmark	45:19.19	+7:50.27
11	Yeokeun Yoon	South Korea	50:13.05	+12:44.13
12	Fabian Recher	Switzerland	DNF	
