= Cycling at the 2012 Summer Paralympics – Men's road time trial H3 =

Cycling, Men's road time trial H3 at the XIV Paralympic Games
- Venue: Brands Hatch
- Dates: September 5, 2012
- Competitors: 10 from 8 nations

Medalists
1st place, gold medalist(s)		Rafał Wilk	Poland
2nd place, silver medalist(s)		Nigel Barley	Australia
3rd place, bronze medalist(s)		Bernd Jeffre	Germany

The Men's time trial H3 road cycling event at the 2012 Summer Paralympics took place on September 5 at Brands Hatch. Ten riders from eight nations competed. The race distance was 16 km.

== Results ==
Rank	Name	Country	Time
1st place, gold medalist(s)	Rafał Wilk	Poland	25:24.17
2nd place, silver medalist(s)	Nigel Barley	Australia	26:18.34
3rd place, bronze medalist(s)	Bernd Jeffre	Germany	27:00.90
4	Vico Merklein	Germany	27:05.81
5	Joël Jeannot	France	27:51.96
6	Thomas Gerlach	Denmark	28:10.82
7	Mauro Cratassa	Italy	28:36.65
8	Arkadiusz Skrzypinski	Poland	28:37.07
9	Mark Ledo	Canada	28:39.64
10	Gaysli Leon	Haiti	45:03.66
