= Cycling at the 2016 Summer Paralympics – Men's road race H4 =

Cycling, Men's road race H4 at the XV Paralympic Games
- Venue: Pontal, Rio
- Dates: September 17
- Competitors: 12

Medalists
| 1st place, gold medalist(s) | | Vico Merklein | Germany |
| 2nd place, silver medalist(s) | | Rafał Wilk | Poland |
| 3rd place, bronze medalist(s) | | Joel Jeannot | France |

The men's road race H4 cycling event at the 2016 Summer Paralympics took place on September 17 at Pontal, Rio. Thirteen riders competed. The race distance was 60 km.

== Results : Men's road race H4 ==
| Rank | Name | Nationality | Classification | Time | Deficit |
|---|---|---|---|---|---|
| 1st place, gold medalist(s) | Vico Merklein | Germany | H4 | 01:28:48 | 0 |
| 2nd place, silver medalist(s) | Rafał Wilk | Poland | H4 | 01:28:51 | 3 |
| 3rd place, bronze medalist(s) | Joel Jeannot | France | H4 | 01:28:54 | 6 |
| 4 | Mathieu Bosredon | France | H4 | s.t. | s.t. |
| 5 | Jonas Van De Steene | Belgium | H4 | 01:28:57 | 9 |
| 6 | Thomas Davis | United States | H4 | 01:28:59 | 11 |
| 7 | Thomas Fruhwirth | Austria | H4 | s.t. | s.t. |
| 8 | Kim Kluver Christiansen | Denmark | H4 | s.t. | s.t. |
| 9 | Michael Jorgensen | Denmark | H4 | 01:33:00 | 04:12:00 |
| 10 | Arkadiusz Skrzypinski | Poland | H4 | 01:35:04 | 06:16:00 |
| 11 | Joel Wagener | Luxembourg | H4 | 01:41:11 | 12:23:00 |
| 12 | Felix Frohofer | Switzerland | H4 | s.t. | s.t. |
