= Grant Allen (cyclist) =

Australian Paralympic cyclist

Personal information
- Nationality: Australian
- Born: 24 July 1980 (age 45) Auburn, South Australia

Sport
- Country: Australia
- Sport: Cycling
- Disability class: H4
- Club: Port Adelaide Cycling Club
Medal record
Cycling
Road World Championships
Silver medal – second place	2025 Ronse	Mixed team relay H1–5

Grant Allen (born 24 July 1980) is an Australian Paralympic cyclist. He represented Australia at the 2020 Tokyo Paralympics.

== Personal ==
Allen was born 24 July 1980 in Auburn, South Australia, where he grew up on a small farm. He moved to Adelaide after finishing high school and started working in a bike shop, extending his riding experience to mountain bikes. He travelled overseas to work with bike brands shooting parts for mountain bike films and competing in events such as the Red Bull Rampage in the Utah desert. In preparation for 2011 Red Bull Rampage whilst training he overshot a large jump and crashed, suffering a spinal cord injury.

== Cycling ==
After his accident, he took up handcycling and is classified as H4. He has won the Men's Road Race and Time Trial H4 events at the Australian Championships from 2017 to 2021. At the 2018 UCI Para-cycling Road World Championships in Maniago, Italy, he finished 8th in the Men's Road Race H4 and 18th Men's Time Trial H4.

At the 2020 Tokyo Paralympics, he finished sixth both the Men's Road Time Trial H4 and Men's Road Race H4.

Allen finished fifth in the Men's Time Trial H4 and sixth in the Men's Road Race H4 at the 2022 UCI Para-cycling Road World Championships in Baie-Comeau.

At the 2025 UCI Para-cycling Road World Championships in Ronse, he won the silver medal in the Mixed Team Relay H1-5, seventh in the Men's Time Trial H4 and ninth in the Men's Road Race H4.
