= Jetze Plat =

Dutch Paralympic athlete (born 1991)

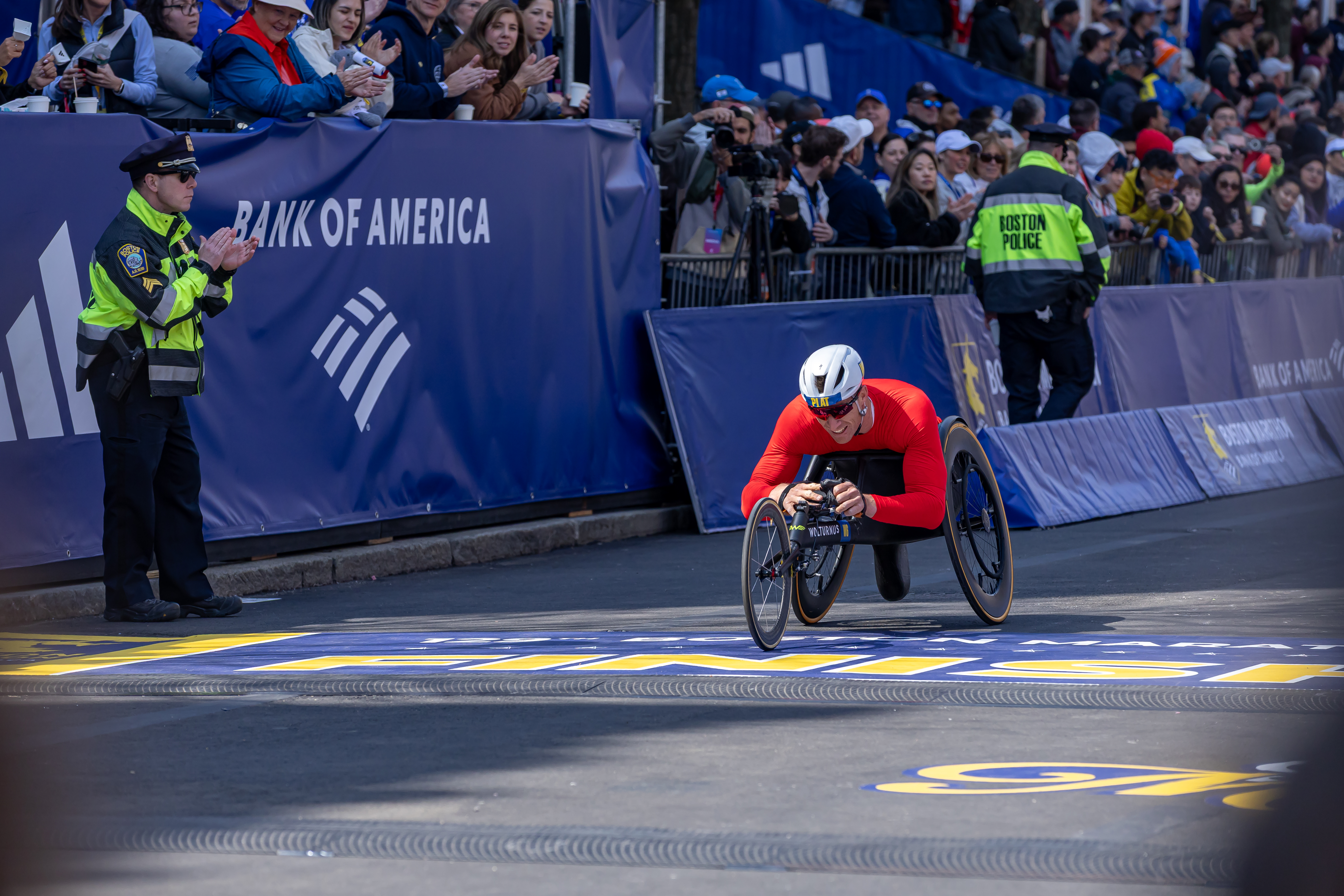
- Jetze Plat finishing at the 129th Boston Marathon

Personal information
- Born: 10 June 1991 (age 35) Amsterdam, Netherlands
- Website: jetzeplat.nl

Sport
- Sport: Para-cycling; Paratriathlon
- Coached by: Guido Vroemen
Medal record
Representing Netherlands
Men's paracycling
Paralympic Games
Gold medal – first place	2020 Tokyo	Road time trial H4
Gold medal – first place	2020 Tokyo	Road Race H4
Gold medal – first place	2024 Paris	Road time trial H4
Gold medal – first place	2024 Paris	Road race H4
Bronze medal – third place	2016 Rio de Janeiro	Road Race H5
Road World Championships
Gold medal – first place	2022 Baie-Comeau	Road race H4
Gold medal – first place	2023 Glasgow	Road time trial H4
Men's paratriathlon
Paralympic Games
Gold medal – first place	2016 Rio de Janeiro	PT1
Gold medal – first place	2020 Tokyo	PTWC
Gold medal – first place	2024 Paris	PTWC
World Championships
Gold medal – first place	2016 Rotterdam	PT1
Gold medal – first place	2017 Rotterdam	PTWC
Gold medal – first place	2018 Gold Coast	PTWC
Gold medal – first place	2019 Lausanne	PTWC
Gold medal – first place	2021 Abu Dhabi	PTWC
Gold medal – first place	2022 Abu Dhabi	PTWC
Gold medal – first place	2024 Torremolinos	PTWC
Silver medal – second place	2013 London	TRI 1
Silver medal – second place	2023 Ponteverde	PTWC
Bronze medal – third place	2015 Chicago	PT1
European Championships
Gold medal – first place	2014 Kitzbühel	PT1
Gold medal – first place	2015 Geneva	PT1
Gold medal – first place	2016 Lisbon	PT1
Gold medal – first place	2017 Kitzbühel	PTWC
Gold medal – first place	2021 Valencia	PTWC
Gold medal – first place	2022 Olsztyn	PTWC
Gold medal – first place	2023 Madrid	PTWC

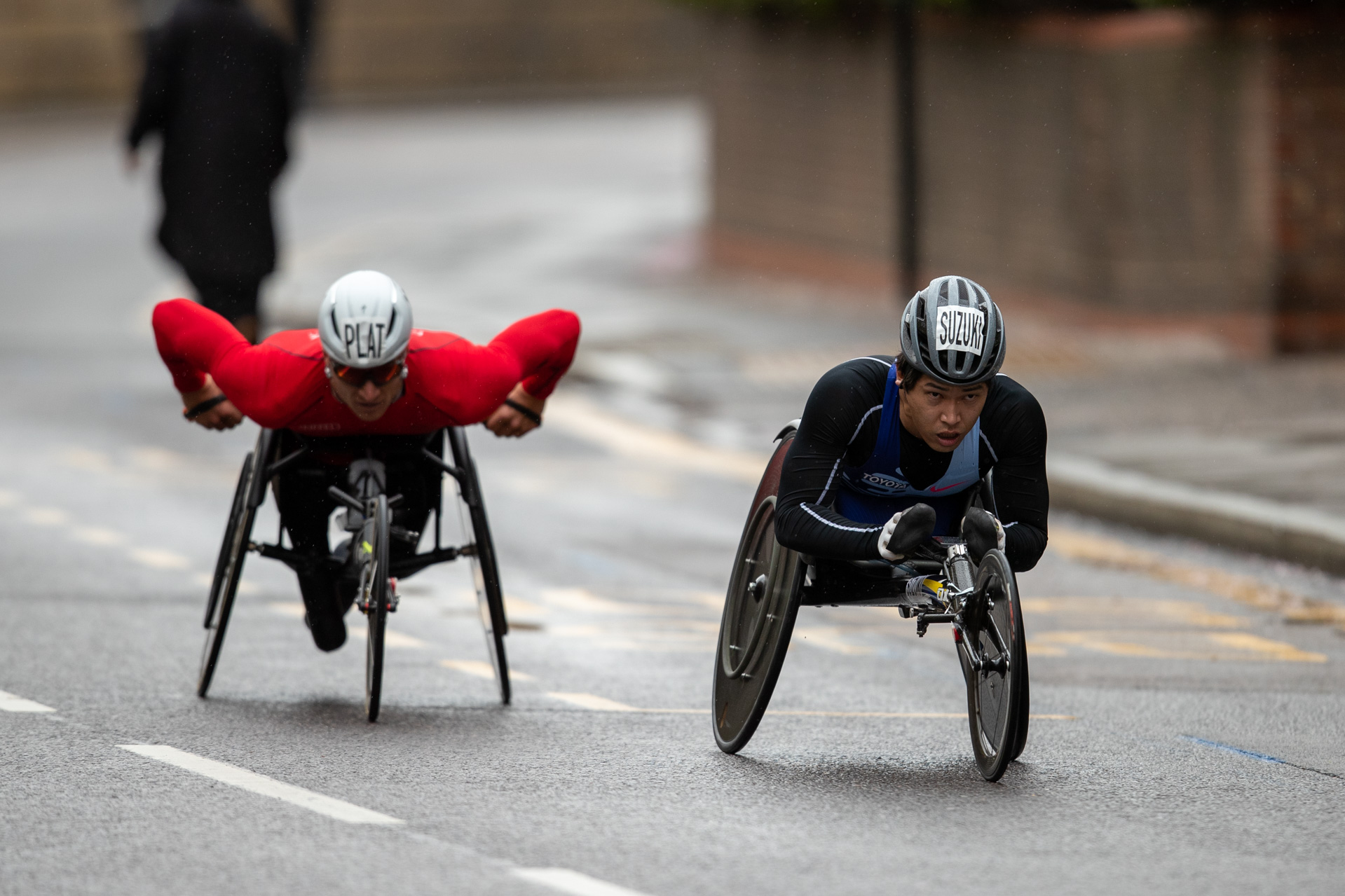
2023 TCS London Marathon - Elite wheelchair race - Tomoki Suzuki (W143) leading Jetze Plat (W158) between mile 16 and 17.

Jetze Plat (born 10 June 1991) is a Dutch para-cyclist in the H4 class. He also competes in the paratriathlon.

== Career ==
Plat was born on 10 June 1991, in Amsterdam, with two stunted legs. In 1995, Plat started using a handcycle, to cycle to school. Later he started practising the sport para-cycling. In the beginning of his athletic career Plat was coached and trained by Kees van Breukelen. As Plat improved in the sport he was coached by Ralf Bekers. During the World Cup in Rome, Plat qualified for the 2012 Summer Paralympics in London. Since 2013, he is coached by Guido Vroemen.

In the 2016 Summer Paralympics in Rio, Plat competed in both cycling and para-triathlon. He won the paratriathlon gold medal in the PT1 class. He also won a bronze medal in the Men's Road Race in H5 class. These were his first Paralympic medals.

He was one of the flag bearers for the Netherlands during the opening ceremony of the 2020 Summer Paralympics.

In Tokyo, at the 2020 Summer Paralympics, Plat competed in both cycling and para-triathlon again. He won gold medals in the Men's H4 Road Race and Men's H4 Time Trial for cycling and a gold medal in the para-triathlon (Men's Individual PTWC).
