= Néstor Javier Ayala =

Colombian paracyclist

Personal information
- Full name: Néstor Javier Ayala Ayala
- Born: Bogotá, Colombia

Sport
- Sport: Para cycling
- Disability class: T2

Achievements and titles
- Paralympic finals: 2016
- World finals: 2013, 2015, 2017, 2018, 2019
- Regional finals: 2011, 2015, 2019
- National finals: 2020
Medal record
Representing Colombia
Paralympic Games
Bronze medal – third place	2016 Rio de Janeiro	Road race T1–2
World Championships
Bronze medal – third place	2013 Baie-Comeau	Road race T2
Bronze medal – third place	2013 Baie-Comeau	Time trial T2
Silver medal – second place	2015 Nottwil	Road race T2
Bronze medal – third place	2018 Maniago	Road race T2
Parapan American Games
Gold medal – first place	2011 Guadalajara	Road race T1-2
Gold medal – first place	2015 Toronto	Road race T1-2
Gold medal – first place	2019 Lima	Road race T1-2

Néstor Javier Ayala Ayala is a Colombian paracyclist, who came third in the men's road race T1–2 event at the 2016 Summer Paralympics. He has also won medals at the 2013, 2015 and 2018 UCI Para-cycling Road World Championships, and multiple medals at the Parapan American Games.

== Personal life ==
Ayala is from Bogotá, Colombia. He studied Physical Education at the University of Santo Tomas.

== Career ==
Ayala started cycling in 2007. He competes in T2 classification events, for athletes with cerebral palsy. He won gold medals at the 2011 and 2015 Parapan American Games, and a silver medal at the 2019 Parapan American Games.

At the 2013 UCI Para-cycling Road World Championships, Ayala came third in both the road race and time trial T2 events. In May 2014, he won a Paralympic World Cup event in Italy. At the 2015 World Championships, Ayala came second in the 28 km road race.

Ayala came third in the men's road race T1–2 event at the 2016 Summer Paralympics. He also came seventh in the time trial T1–2 event at the Games. At the 2017 UCI Para-cycling Road World Championships, Ayala finished fourth in the time trial T2 event, a fraction of a second behind Stephen Hills, who finished third. At the 2018 World Championships, Ayala finished third in the road race T2 event. He competed at the 2019 World Championships, but did not win a medal. That year, he also came fourth in a World Cup road race event in Italy. At the 2020 Colombian National Championships, Ayala won the road race event, and finished second in the time trial.

== Honours ==
Ayala won the Acord Bogotá-IDRD award in 2013 and 2014.
