= Simone Kennedy (cyclist) =

English-born Australian cyclist

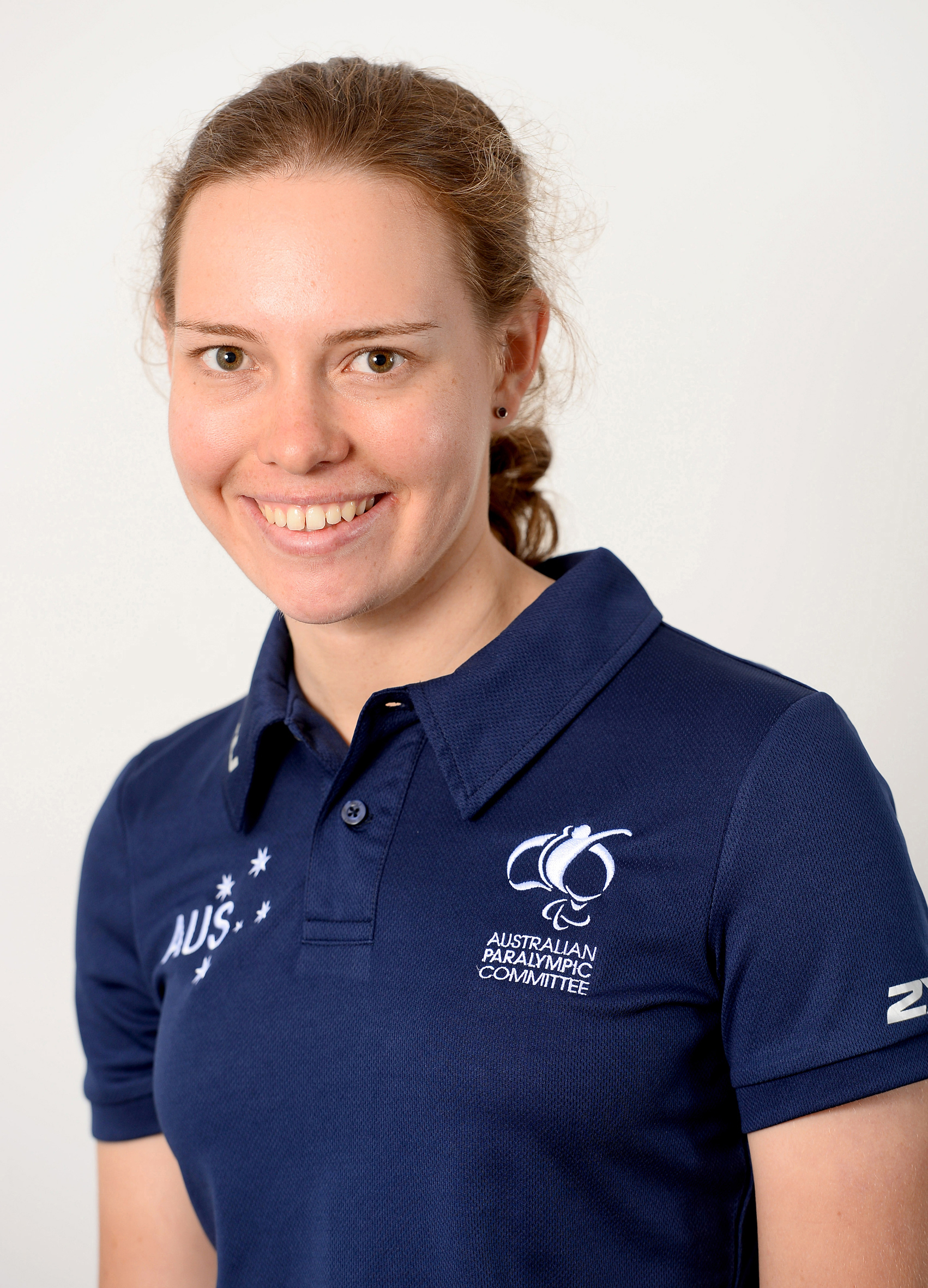
- 2016 Australian Paralympic team portrait of Kennedy

Personal information
- Nationality: Australian
- Born: 4 January 1994 (age 32) London, England

Sport
- Country: Australia
- Sport: Cycling
- Club: Parramatta Cycling Club
Medal record
Cycling
Paralympic Games
Silver medal – second place	2012 London	Women's individual pursuit C1-3
UCI Para-cycling Track World Championships
Gold medal – first place	2012 Los Angeles	Women's 3km Individual Pursuit C3
Gold medal – first place	2012 Los Angeles	Women's 500m Time Trial C3
Gold medal – first place	2017 Los Angeles	Women's 3km Individual Pursuit C3
Bronze medal – third place	2014 Aguascalientes	Women's 3km Individual Pursuit C3
Bronze medal – third place	2014 Aguascalientes	Women's 500m Time Trial C3
Bronze medal – third place	2015 Appledorn	Women's 3km Individual Pursuit C3
Bronze medal – third place	2015 Appledorn	Women's 500m Time Trial C3
Bronze medal – third place	2016 Montichiari	Women's 3km Individual Pursuit C3
UCI Para-cycling Road World Championships
Bronze medal – third place	2015 Nottwil	Women's Time Trial C3
Bronze medal – third place	2015 Nottwil	Women's Road Race C3

Simone Kennedy (born 4 January 1994) is an Australian cyclist. She represented Australia at the 2012 Summer Paralympics and won a silver medal in the individual pursuit C1-3. She represented Australia at the 2016 Rio Paralympics.

== Personal ==
Kennedy was born on 4 January 1994 in London, England. She has cerebral palsy which affects the left side of her body. She attended Tara Anglican School for Girls and she credits the teachers at the school in encouraging her to become involved in disability sport. In 2016, she is studying a Bachelor of Sports Coaching and Administration at the Australian College of Physical Education in Sydney.

== Cycling ==
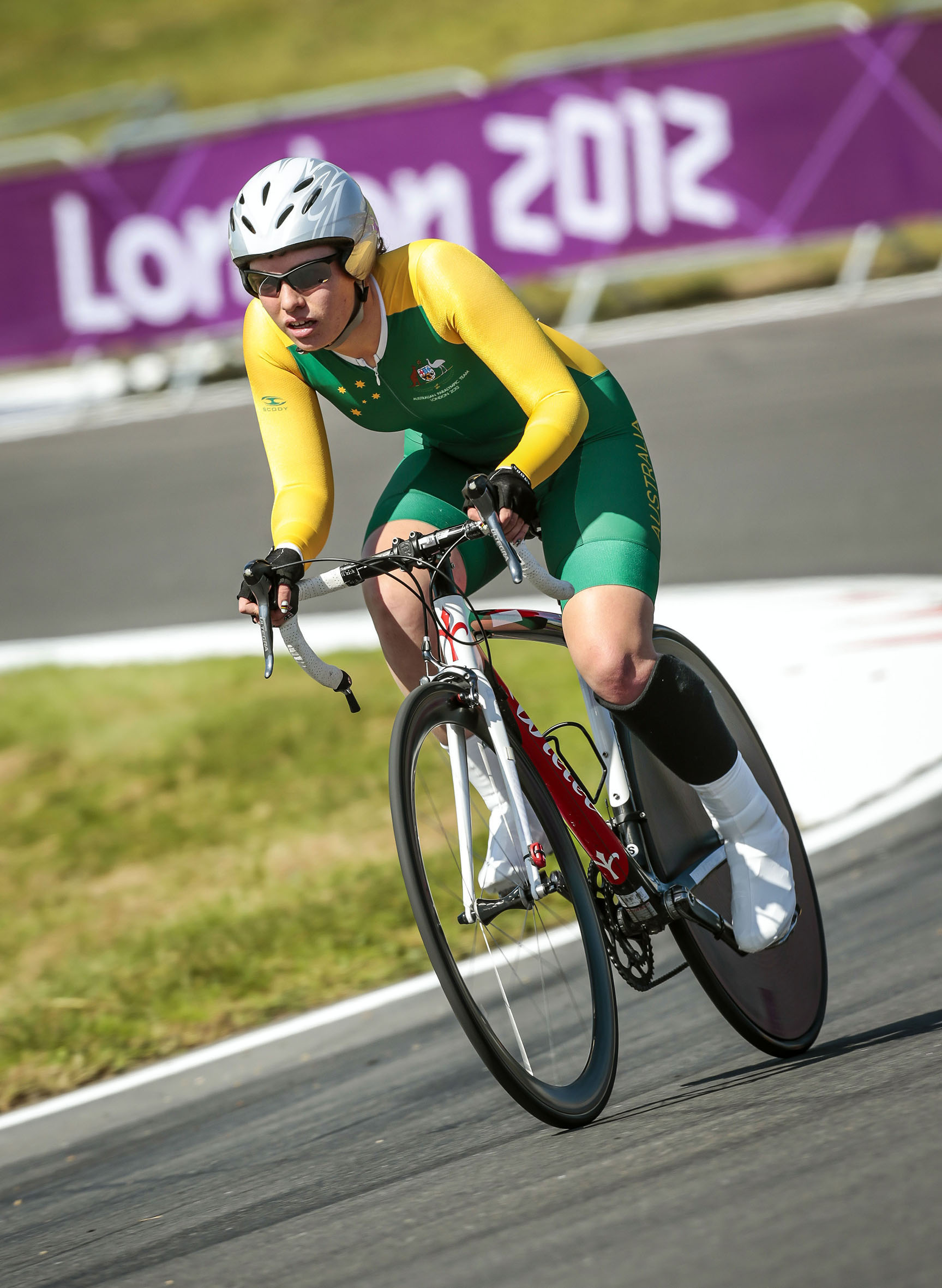
Kennedy at the 2012 London Paralympics

Kennedy is a C3 classified cyclist. She is a member of the Parramatta Cycling Club.

Kennedy started cycling when she was a fifteen-year-old. In 2012, she participated her first major international competition when she cycled in the UCI Para-cycling Track World Championships in Los Angeles, where she finished first in the C3 500-metre time trial and 3-kilometre individual pursuit. She was selected to represent Australia at the 2012 Summer Paralympics in cycling's 3 km pursuit, the 500m time trial and two road roads. In the lead up to the Paralympics, she participated in the Blenheim Palace festival of cycling time trial event.

At the 2014 UCI Para-cycling Track World Championships in Aguascalientes in Mexico, she won bronze medals in the Women's 3 km Individual Pursuit C3 and Women's 500m Time Trial C3.

Kennedy repeated her 2014 medal results at the 2015 UCI Para-cycling Track World Championships in Appledorn in Netherlands by winning bronze medals in the Women's 500m Time Trial C3 and Women's 3 km Individual Pursuit C3.

At the 2015 UCI Para-cycling Road World Championships Nottwil, Switzerland, she won a bronze medal in the Women's Time Trial C3. and Women's Road Race C3.

At the 2016 Rio Paralympics, she competed in four events. Her best results were eight in the Women's individual pursuit C1-3 and Women's road race C1-3.

Kennedy won the gold medal in the Women's 3 km Individual Pursuit at the 2017 UCI Para-cycling Track World Championships, Los Angeles, United States.

At the 2017 UCI Para-cycling Road World Championships, Pietermaritzburg, South Africa, she finished fifth in the Women's Time Trial C3 and fifth in the Women's Road Race C1-3. In 2016, she is a New South Wales Institute of Sport scholarship holder.
