= Florian Brungraber =

Austrian Paralympic athlete (born 1984)

Personal information
- Born: 29 September 1984 (age 41) Freistadt, Upper Austria, Austria

Sport
- Country: Austria
- Sport: Paratriathlon
- Disability class: PTWC
Medal record
Men's paratriathlon
Representing Austria
Paralympic Games
| Silver medal – second place | 2020 Tokyo | PTWC |
| Silver medal – second place | 2024 Paris | PTWC |
World Championships
| Silver medal – second place | 2022 Abu Dhabi | PTWC |
| Silver medal – second place | 2024 Torremolinos | PTWC |
| Silver medal – second place | 2025 Wollongong | PTWC |
| Silver medal – second place | 2026 Pontevedra | PTWC |
| Bronze medal – third place | 2021 Abu Dhabi | PTWC |
| Bronze medal – third place | 2023 Ponteverde | PTWC |
European Championships
| Silver medal – second place | 2021 Valencia | PTWC |
| Silver medal – second place | 2023 Madrid | PTWC |
| Silver medal – second place | 2024 Vichy | PTWC |
| Bronze medal – third place | 2019 Valencia | PTWC |
| Bronze medal – third place | 2022 Olsztyn | PTWC |

Florian Brungraber (born 29 September 1984) is an Austrian paratriathlete. He represented Austria at the 2020 Summer Paralympics and he won the silver medal in the men's PTWC event.
