= Hans-Peter Durst =

German para cyclist

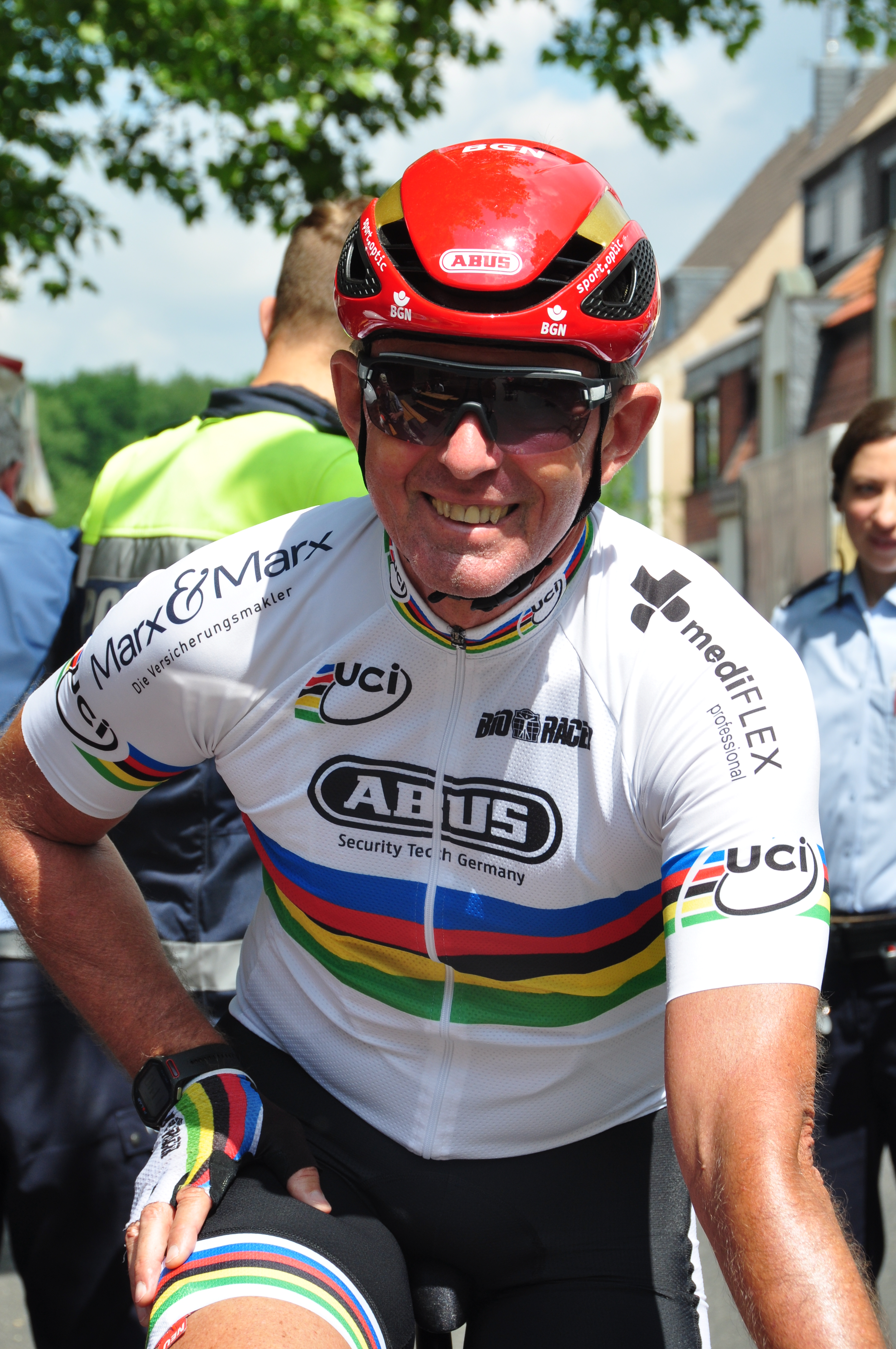
- Durst in 2017

Personal information
- Born: 24 May 1958 (age 68) Dortmund, Germany

Sport
- Sport: Para-cycling
- Disability class: T2
- Retired: 2022

Achievements and titles
- Paralympic finals: 2012, 2016
- World finals: 2015, 2017, 2019, 2021
Medal record
Representing Germany
Paralympic Games
Silver medal – second place	2012 London	Time trial T1–2
Gold medal – first place	2016 Rio de Janeiro	Time trial T1–2
Gold medal – first place	2016 Rio de Janeiro	Road race T1–2
UCI Para-cycling Road World Championships
Gold medal – first place	2015 Nottwil	Time trial T2
Gold medal – first place	2015 Nottwil	Road race T2
Gold medal – first place	2017 Pietermaritzburg	Time trial T1–2
Gold medal – first place	2017 Pietermaritzburg	Road race T1–2
Gold medal – first place	2019 Emmen	Time trial T1–2

Hans-Peter Durst (born 24 May 1958) is a German former para cyclist who won two gold medals at the 2016 Summer Paralympics, and a silver medal at the 2012 Summer Paralympics. He won gold medals at the 2015, 2017 and 2019 UCI Para-cycling Road World Championships.

== Personal life ==
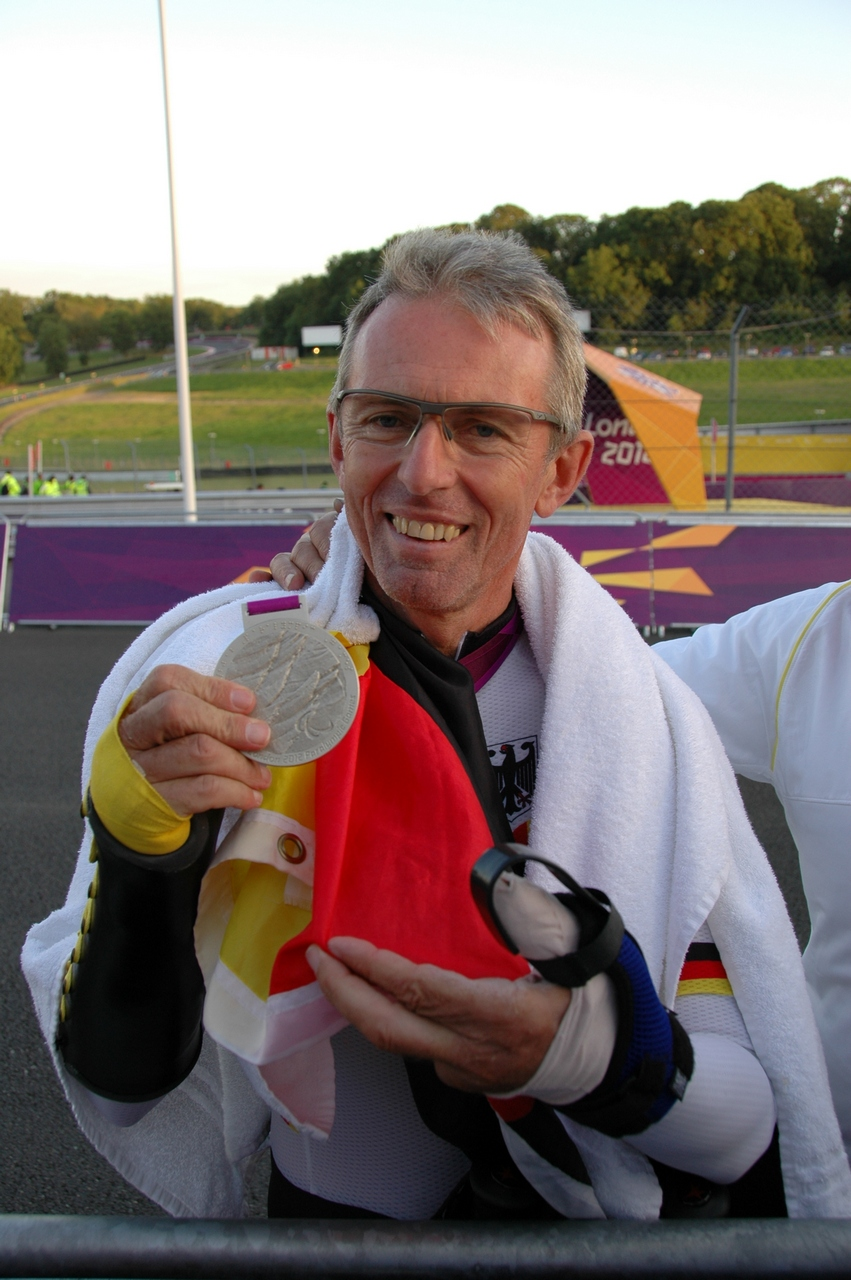
Durst with his 2012 Summer Paralympics silver medal

Durst is from Dortmund, Germany. He has two children. Durst has a loss of the sense of balance after a traumatic brain injury, caused by a car accident in 1994.

== Career ==
Durst competed in T2 classification competitions, for athletes that use a tricycle. At the 2012 Summer Paralympics, he came second in the time trial T1–2 event. At the 2015 UCI Para-cycling Road World Championships, he won the road race and time trial T2 events.

In the road time trial T1–2 event at the 2016 Summer Paralympics, Durst's saddle fell off his tricycle after 500 metres (0.31 mi) of the race, and he rode for 14.5 kilometres (9.0 mi) without a saddle. Nevertheless, he won the competition, by over a minute. He also won the road race T1–2 at the same Games. Durst's tricycle at the Games cost €18,000, and weighed 11.8 kilograms (26 lb), which was just above the competition's minimum weight limit.

In 2017, Durst won the time trial and road race T2 events at the Para-Cycling World Cup event in Emmen, Netherlands. At the 2017 UCI Para-cycling Road World Championships, Durst won the time trial and road race T2 events. As of 2018, Durst was the oldest professional cyclist registered with the Union Cycliste Internationale. He did not compete at the Para-Cycling World Cup in 2018, and missed much of the 2019 season as well for health reasons. At the 2019 UCI Para-cycling Road World Championships, he won the time trial event.

In May 2021, Durst chose not to compete in the delayed 2020 Summer Paralympics in Tokyo, Japan, due to the COVID-19 pandemic, the effect of the Paralympics on Japan's COVID-19 rates, and in solidarity with the Japanese people, most of whom did not want the Games to happen. In June 2021, he competed at the 2021 UCI Para-cycling Road World Championships.

In June 2022, Durst announced his retirement from para-cycling.

== Honours ==
Durst was named Dortmund's athlete of the year for 2011 and 2012. He won the award again in 2016.
