= Triathlon at the 2020 Summer Paralympics – Men's PTWC =

Men's PTWC at the XVI Paralympic Games
- Venue: Odaiba Marine Park
- Dates: 29 August 2021
- Competitors: 10 from 7 nations

Medalists
1st place, gold medalist(s)		Jetze Plat	Netherlands
2nd place, silver medalist(s)		Florian Brungraber	Austria
3rd place, bronze medalist(s)		Giovanni Achenza	Italy

The Triathlon at the 2020 Summer Paralympics – Men's PTWC event at the 2020 Paralympic Games took place at 06:30 on 29 August 2021 at the Odaiba Marine Park.

== Results ==
Key : T = Transition; L = Lap

Rank	Bib	Name	Nationality	Swim	T1	Bike				T2	Run				Time
Rank	Bib	Name	Nationality	Swim	T1	L1	L2	L3	L4	T2	L1	L2	L3	L4	Time
1st place, gold medalist(s)	123	Jetze Plat	Netherlands	9:31	1:11	7:28	7:31	7:41	7:51	0:47	2:50	3:08	3:09	3:36	57:51
2nd place, silver medalist(s)	126	Florian Brungraber	Austria	10:27	1:23	7:52	8:00	8:02	8:05	0:54	2:48	3:01	2:59	3:16	59:55
3rd place, bronze medalist(s)	127	Giovanni Achenza	Italy	11:44	1:17	8:04	8:20	8:30	8:38	0:44	3:17	3:44	3:48	3:59	1:02:05
4	124	Geert Schipper	Netherlands	10:55	1:18	8:21	8:36	8:27	8:40	0:49	2:56	3:11	3:12	3:28	1:03:01
5	129	Ahmed Andaloussi	France	13:00	1:28	8:45	8:53	8:50	9:08	0:55	3:08	3:21	3:26	3:51	1:04:45
6	122	Jumpei Kimura	Japan	12:04	1:24	8:40	9:35	8:56	9:01	1:02	3:17	3:30	3:34	3:47	1:04:50
7	125	Nic Beveridge	Australia	11:42	1:09	9:38	9:14	9:05	9:20	1:00	3:07	3:24	3:26	3:45	1:04:50
8	121	Fathi Zwoukhi	Tunisia	12:37	1:25	8:49	8:55	8:50	9:49	1:17	3:03	3:49	3:31	3:39	1:05:44
9	128	Pier Alberto Buccoliero	Italy	12:14	1:34	8:50	8:59	9:05	9:16	0:50	3:28	3:38	4:06	4:08	1:09:16
10	130	Alexandre Paviza	France	13:01	1:30	9:09	9:13	9:14	9:35	0:55	4:34	5:12	3:45	4:46	1:10:54
