= Cycling at the 2012 Summer Paralympics – Women's individual pursuit C1–3 =

Women's Individual Pursuit C 1-3 at the XIV Paralympic Games
- Venue: London Velopark
- Date: 30 August
- Competitors: 10 from 8 nations

Medalists
1st place, gold medalist(s)		Sini Zeng	China
2nd place, silver medalist(s)		Simone Kennedy	Australia
3rd place, bronze medalist(s)		Allison Jones	United States

The women's C1–3 individual pursuit event in cycling at the 2012 Summer Olympics was held on 30 August at the London Velopark. Ten riders from eight nations competed.

The competition began with five head to head races between the ten riders. These races were held over a 3000 m course and each rider was given a time for their race. The fastest two riders were advanced to the gold medal final whilst the third and fourth fastest times raced it out for the bronze.

The gold medal was eventually won by Zeng Sini of China, while Simone Kennedy of Australia took the silver and Allison Jones of the United States took bronze.

== Qualification ==
Rank	Athlete	Nationality	Class	Time
1	Zeng Sini	China	C2	4:19.841
2	Simone Kennedy	Australia	C3	4:23.450
3	Denise Schindler	Germany	C3	4:24.589
4	Allison Jones	United States	C2	4:28.504
5	Alyda Norbruis	Netherlands	C2	4:30.507
6	He Yin	China	C2	4:34.515
7	Raquel Acinas Poncelas	Spain	C2	4:38.537
8	Jayme Paris	Australia	C1	4:40.123
9	Tereza Diepoldova	Czech Republic	C2	4:47.356
10	Anita Ruetz	Austria	C2	5:05.697

== Bronze medal race ==
Rank	Athlete	Nationality	Time	Average speed
3rd place, bronze medalist(s)	Allison Jones	United States	4:27.793	40.329 km/h
4	Denise Schindler	Germany	4:31.117	39.835 km/h

== Gold medal race ==
Rank	Athlete	Nationality	Time	Average speed
1st place, gold medalist(s)	Zeng Sini	China	4:20.820	41.407 km/h
2nd place, silver medalist(s)	Simone Kennedy	Australia	4:24.893	40.771 km/h
