= Thomas Frühwirth =

Austrian para-cyclist (born 1981)

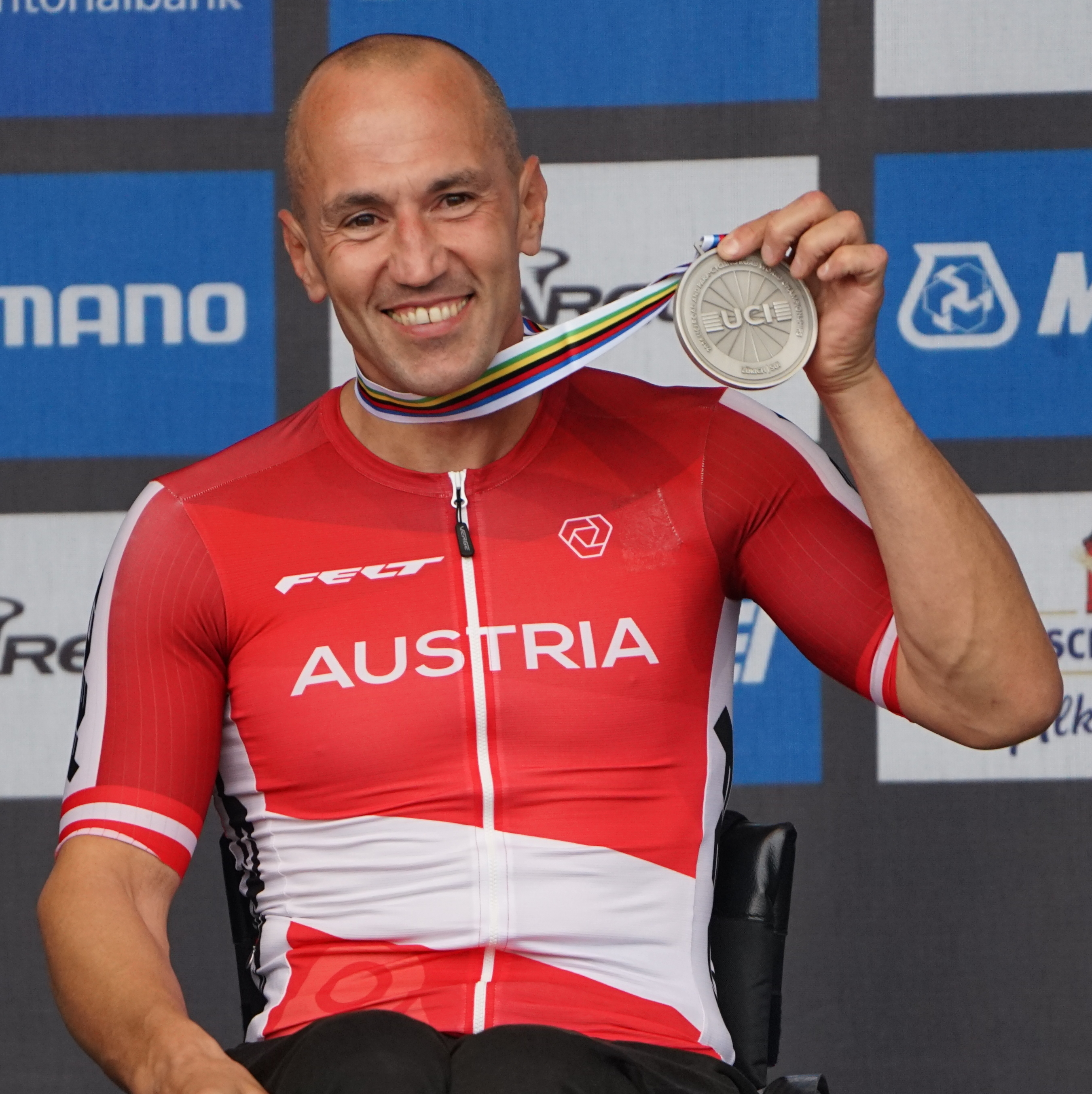
- Frühwirth at the 2024 World Championships

Personal information
- Nickname: TiggerTom
- Nationality: Austrian
- Born: 12 August 1981 (age 45) Graz, Austria

Sport
- Sport: Para-cycling
- Disability class: H4
Medal record
Representing Austria
Men's Para-cycling
Event	1st	2nd	3rd
Paralympic Games	0	5	0
Road World Championships	2	5	5
European Para Championships	1	0	1
Total	3	10	6
Paralympic Games
Silver medal – second place	2016 Rio de Janeiro	Road time trial H4
Silver medal – second place	2020 Tokyo	Road time trial H4
Silver medal – second place	2020 Tokyo	Road race H4
Silver medal – second place	2024 Paris	Road time trial H4
Silver medal – second place	2024 Paris	Road race H4
Road World Championships
Gold medal – first place	2024 Zurich	Time trial H4
Gold medal – first place	2025 Ronse	Time trial H4
Silver medal – second place	2021 Cascais	Road race H4
Silver medal – second place	2021 Cascais	Time trial H4
Silver medal – second place	2022 Baie-Comeau	Time trial H4
Silver medal – second place	2022 Baie-Comeau	Road race H4
Silver medal – second place	2024 Zurich	Road race H4
Bronze medal – third place	2023 Glasgow	Road race H4
Bronze medal – third place	2025 Ronse	Road race H4
European Championships
Gold medal – first place	2023 Rotterdam	Time trial H4
Bronze medal – third place	2023 Rotterdam	Road race H4
Men's paratriathlon
World Championships
Gold medal – first place	2010 Budapest	TRI 1
Gold medal – first place	2025 Wollongong	PTWC
Gold medal – first place	2026 Pontevedra	PTWC
Bronze medal – third place	2024 Torremolinos	PTWC
European Championships
Gold medal – first place	2025 Besançon	PTWC
Silver medal – second place	2017 Kitzbühel	PTWC
Men's para-duathlon
World Championships
Gold medal – first place	2011 Gijon	TRI 1

Thomas Frühwirth (born 12 August 1981) is an Austrian Para-cyclist who represented Austria at the Paralympic Games.

== Early life ==
Thomas Frühwirth was born on a farm in southeast Styria, Austria. He has three brothers. At the age of 15 he started Enduro sports. He completed an apprenticeship as a car mechanic and car electrician, worked in development at Steyr Daimler Puch and later at the motorcycle manufacturer KTM AG. In 2004 he had a motorcycle accident while on vacation in Poland. The result was incomplete paraplegia.

== Career ==
Frühwirth represented Austria in the men's road time trial H4 and road race H4 events at the 2016 Summer Paralympics and won a silver medal in time trial. He again represented Austria in the men's road time trial H4 and road race H4 events at the 2020 Summer Paralympics and won two silver medals.

Thomas Frühwirth owns the course record in the division Handcycling at the Ironman Hawaii in 8h 15' 39" (Ironman World Championship 2022).

In September 2026, he competed at the 2026 World Triathlon Para Championships and won a gold medal despite suffering a punctured tire on his racing chair just after the first corner of the run.

== Sports achievements ==
=== Achievements in para-cycling ===
Year	Competition	Country	Ranking
2025	UCI Para-cycling Road World Championships - Time Trial	Belgium	Gold
2025	UCI Para-cycling Road World Championships - Road Race	Belgium	Bronze
2024	UCI Para-cycling Road World Championships - Time Trial	Switzerland	Gold
2024	UCI Para-cycling Road World Championships - Road Race	Switzerland	Silver
2024	2024 Summer Paralympics - Time Trial	France	Silver
2024	2024 Summer Paralympics - Road Race	France	Silver
2023	UCI Para-cycling Road World Championships - Road Race	Scotland	Bronze
2022	UCI Para-cycling Road World Championships - Time Trial	Canada	Silver
2022	UCI Para-cycling Road World Championships - Road Race	Canada	Silver
2021	2020 Summer Paralympics - Time Trial	Japan	Silver
2021	2020 Summer Paralympics - Road Race	Japan	Silver
2021	UCI Para-cycling Road World Championships - Time Trial	Portugal	Silver
2021	UCI Para-cycling Road World Championships - Road Race	Portugal	Silver
2019	UCI Para-cycling Road World Championships - Time Trial	Netherlands	Bronze
2016	2016 Summer Paralympics - Time Trial	Brazil	Silver
2015	UCI Para-cycling Road World Championships - Time Trial	Switzerland	Bronze
2014	UCI Para-cycling Road World Championships - Time Trial	United States	Bronze

=== Achievements in Para-Triathlon ===
The table shows the most significant results (podium) obtained in paratriathlon competitions since 2010.

Year	Competition	Country	Ranking	Time
2026	World Triathlon Para Championships	Spain	Gold	1h 02' 33"
2025	Europe Triathlon Para Championships	France	Gold	1h 02' 24"
2024	World Triathlon Para Championships	Spain	Bronze	0h 59' 17"
2023	Ironman World Championship 2023 Nice	France	Gold	9h 43' 21"
2022	Ironman World Championship 2022 Hawaii	United States	Gold	8h 15' 39"
2022	Ironman World Championship 2021 St. George Utah	United States	Gold	9h 29' 35"
2020	Ironman Cozumel	Mexico	Gold	8h 08' 27"
2020	Knappenman "Ironman"	Germany	Gold	7h 26' 18"
2017	30. Austria Triathlon (Ironman distance)	Austria	Gold	7h 48' 36"
2017	2017 European Para-Triathlon Championships PTWC-H2	Austria	Silver	1h 02' 42"
2017	Austrian Para-Triathlon Championships PTWC-H2	Austria	Gold	58' 05"
2015	Ironman 70.3 Zell am See	Austria	Gold	4h 53' 35"
2013	Ironman World Championship Hawaii	United States	Gold	9h 2' 55"
2011	ITU Para-Duathlon World Championships TR1	Spain	Gold	58' 44"
2011	IUTA Double Ironman	Slovenia	Gold	22h 05' 52"
2010	ITU Para-Triathlon World Championships TR1	Hungary	Gold	1h 08' 36"
2010	Ironman World Championship Hawaii	United States	Silver	10h 13' 27"
