= Alexander Gritsch =

Austrian para-cyclist (born 1982)

Personal information
- Nationality: Austrian
- Born: 7 May 1982 (age 44) Tarrenz, Austria

Sport
- Sport: Para-cycling
- Disability class: H4
- Coached by: Michael Flir
Medal record
Men's Para-cycling
Representing Austria
Paralympic Games
Bronze medal – third place	2020 Tokyo	Road time trial H4
Road World Championships
Bronze medal – third place	2021 Cascais	Road time trial H4
European Championships
Silver medal – second place	2023 Rotterdam	Time trial H4

Alexander Gritsch (born 12 August 1982) is an Austrian Para-cyclist who represented Austria at the 2020 Summer Paralympics.

== Career ==
Gritsch represented Austria at the 2021 UCI Para-cycling Road World Championships in the time trial H4 event and won a bronze medal.

Gritsch represented Austria in the men's road time trial H4 event at the 2020 Summer Paralympics and won a bronze medal.
