= Nigel Barley (cyclist) =

Australian cyclist (born 1974)

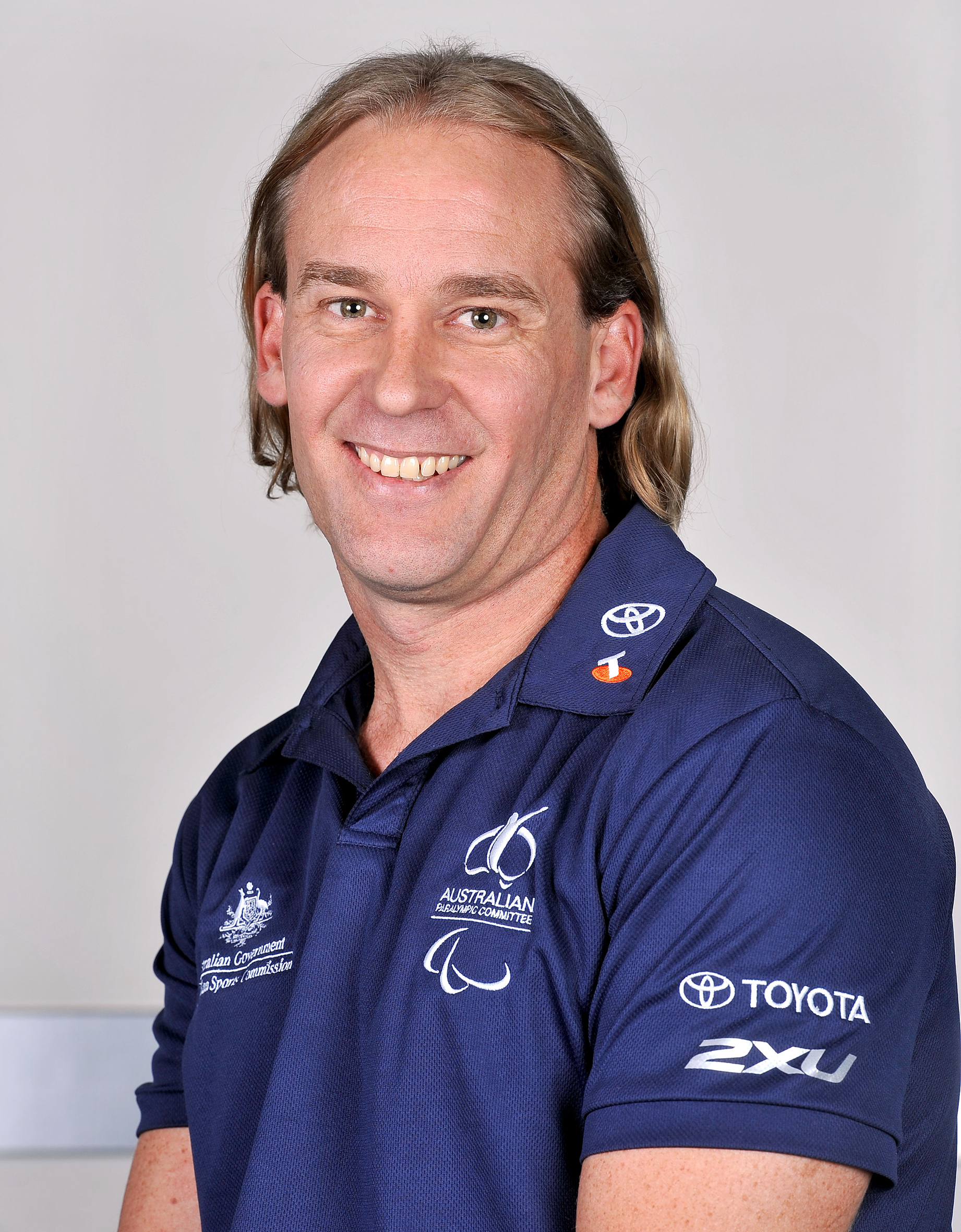
- 2012 Australian Paralympic team portrait of Barley

Personal information
- Nationality: Australian
- Born: 27 September 1974 (age 52) Western Australia

Sport
- Country: Australia
- Sport: Cycling
- Events: Road time trial Road race
Medal record
Cycling
Paralympic Games
Silver medal – second place	2012 London	Men's IndividualRoad Time Trial H3
Para-cycling Road World Championships
Bronze medal – third place	2013 Baie-Comeau	Men's Individual Time Trial H3

Nigel Barley (born 27 September 1974) is an Australian cyclist. At the 2012 Summer Paralympics, he won a silver medal.

== Personal ==
Barley was born on 27 September 1974. He is from Western Australia. When he was twenty-six years old, he broke his back after falling from a roof and onto a hammer. As of 2012, he lives in Parkerville, Western Australia.

== Cycling ==
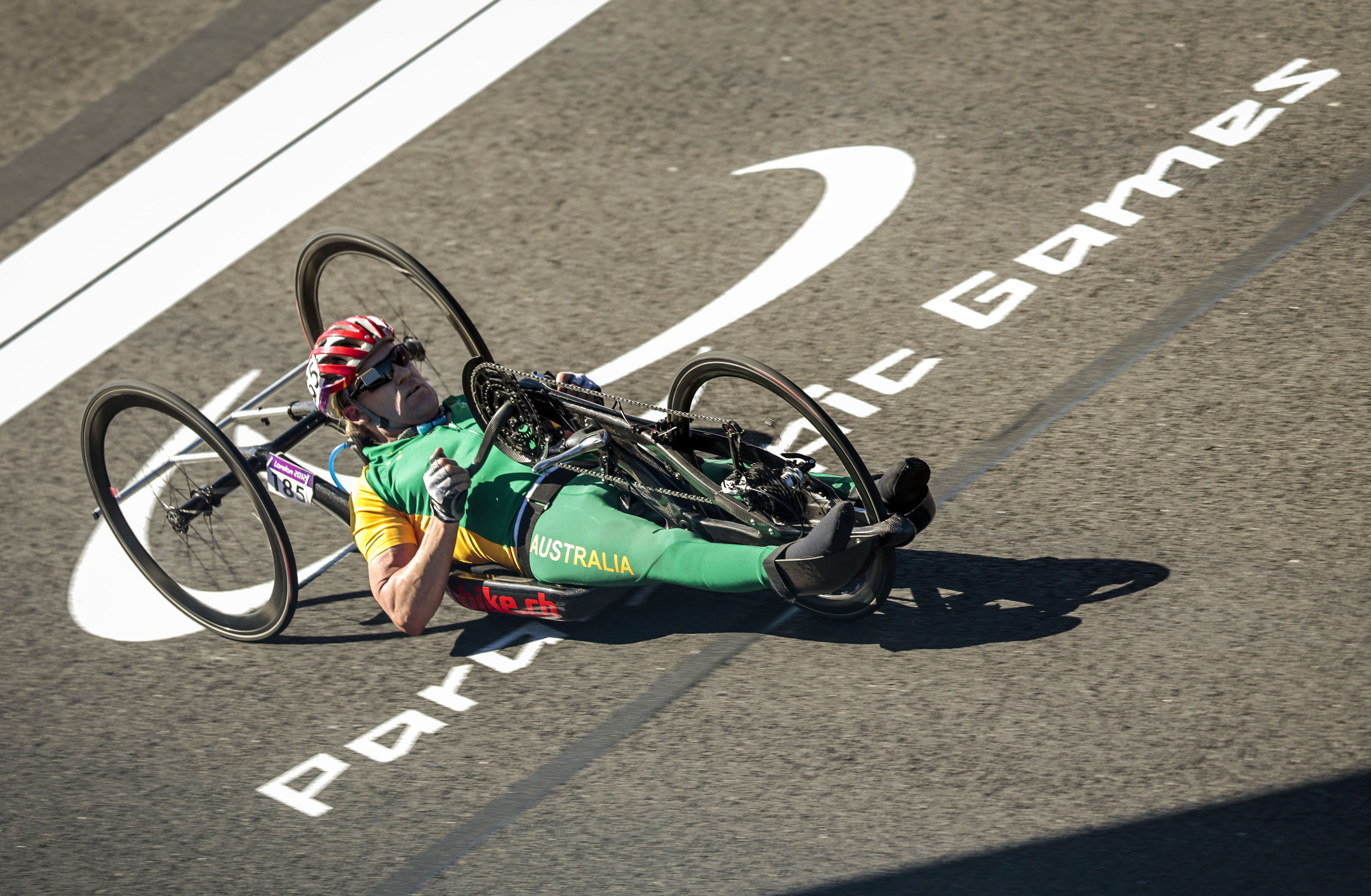
Barley at the 2012 London Paralympics

Barley is an H3 classified hand-cyclist competing in road time trial and road race events. He has a scholarship with the Western Australian Institute of Sport. His carbon fibre hand-cycle costs A$20,000.

Barley took up the sport within a year of his accident. He has hand-cycled from Perth, Western Australia to Sydney, New South Wales. At the 2011 para-cycling road World Cup in Sydney, he finished third in the H3 hand cycling event. In 2012, he competed in races in Italy, Spain, Switzerland, Australia and France. Some of these races were part of the 2012 International Paracycling Tour season. Others were part of the World Cup season. At the 2012 Summer Paralympics, he won a silver medal in the Men's Road Individual Time Trial H3. He was the sixth Western Australia to be named to the Australian team. The Paralympics were his first.

Competing at the 2013 Para-cycling Road World Championships, Baie-Comeau, Canada, he won a bronze medal in the Men's Individual Time Trial H3.

== Recognition ==
Nigel is a three-time winner of the Wheelchair Sports WA Sports Star of the Year award having won in 2011 alongside Darren Gardiner, 2012 alongside Shaun Norris, and 2013.
