= Aleksandra Wnuczek =

Polish cyclist

Personal information
- Born: 23 May 1986 (age 40) Poland

Cycling career
- Sport: Cycling
- Discipline: Road cycling

Professional team
- 2008: POL-Aqua

Aleksandra Wnuczek (born 23 May 1986) is a road cyclist from Poland. She represented her nation at the 2007 UCI Road World Championships.
