= Valentina Strobl =

Austrian Paralympian (born 2000)

Personal information
- Nationality: Austrian
- Born: 12 May 2000 (age 26) Innsbruck, Austria

Sport
- Country: Austria
- Sport: Para-equestrian

Valentina Strobl (born 12 May 2000 in Innsbruck) is an Austrian Paralympic equestrian. She qualified for the 2020 Summer Paralympics and the 2024 Summer Paralympics.

== Career ==
She competed at the 2018 CDI Juniors Tour. She competed at the Commercial Bank Chi Al Shaqab, Para Dressage CPEDI3 .
