= Iwona Podkościelna =

Polish Paralympic cyclist

Iwona Podkościelna (born 1 June 1988 in Bychawa) is a Polish road racing paracyclist. She, along with her pilot Alexsandra Teclaw, won a gold medal at the 2016 Summer Paralympics for Team Poland in the women's road race B.

In 2015 Iwona won double gold at the UCI Para-cycling Road World Championships in Nottwil, Switzerland.
