= Stephen Hills (cyclist) =

New Zealand Paralympic cyclist

Personal information
- Born: 15 December 1981 (age 44)

Sport
- Country: New Zealand
- Sport: Cycling
- Disability class: T2
- Coached by: Stu MacDonald
Medal record
UCI Para-cycling Road World Championships
Bronze medal – third place	2019 Emmen	T2 road race

Stephen Hills (born 15 December 1981) is a New Zealand cyclist. He competed at the 2016 and 2020 Summer Paralympics. He was a bronze medallist at the 2019 UCI Para-cycling Road World Championships in the Netherlands.
