= Tom Davis (handcyclist) =

American Paralympian handcyclist

Thomas (Tom) Howard Davis
- Born: April 22, 1977 (age 49); Montpelier, Indiana
- Occupation: Hand Cyclist
- Years active: 2012 to Current
- Organization: TeamUSA Paralympian
- Height: 6 ft 0 in (183 cm)
- Spouse: Jamie (Brown) Davis
- Children: Brenan, Elliana, Isaiah, Lyllian
- Website: https://www.tomdavisparacycling.com

Tom Davis
- Military career
- Allegiance: United States
- Branch: Army
- Rank: Sergeant

Thomas (Tom) Davis is a TeamUSA Paralympian Handcyclist in the MH4 category. He has won the Boston Marathon 2015 through 2019. He was scheduled to compete in the Boston Marathon in 2020 but it was cancelled due to the COVID-19 Pandemic. He competed in the 2016 Rio Paralympic Games. Davis is currently training to compete for TeamUSA at the Tokyo Paralympic Games.

== Personal life ==
Davis met his wife Jamie (née Brown) in November 2003. The couple became engaged in February 2004 and were married in July that same year. Their wedding was originally scheduled for May 2004 but it was delayed due to Davis being extended in Iraq with the U.S. Army.

The couple are parents to four children, Brenan, Elliana (Elli), Isaiah, and Lyllian (Lylli). The Davis family makes their home in Fremont, Indiana.

== Military career ==
In June 2006, while stationed in Ramadi, Iraq, the Humvee that Davis was riding in hit an improvised explosive device (IED). The Humvee was rocketed into in the air and landed on its top. Davis was trapped in the Humvee and pulled out by Jason Dickerson, an Army medic. Davis suffered massive blood loss, a concussion, traumatic brain injury, two broken forearms, right broken knee, broken nose, broken facial bones and a broken toe on his right foot. After numerous surgeries to repair his body to include a spinal fusion, the decision was made to amputate his left leg above the knee.

== Racing career ==
A part of Davis' rehabilitation from his military injuries was handcycling. He began handcycling in 2012. Davis raced in the Boston Marathon in 2015 and 2016 and won the event. In 2017, Handcycling was officially recognized at the Boston Marathon. Davis continued to win in 2017, 2018 and 2019.

In July 2016, Davis was named to the TeamUSA Paralympic Team for the 2016 Rio Paralympics.

During the 2017 Detroit Free Press/Chemical Bank Marathon, Davis hit a manhole cover and had to leave the race due to a flat tire.

In April 2021, Davis raced the 15 km time trial course in Huntsville, Alabama. While there, Davis completed the course in a time of 20:43, beating all competitors.

=== Major results ===
Year	Boston Marathon	Detroit Free Press Marathon	Pittsburgh Marathon	Crim Festival of the Races	USA Cycling Masters National Championships	Paralympics
2013	1:17:59	1:18:46	1:10:00			
2014		1:09:48 CR				
2015	1:17:49	1:12:37				
2016		1:08:39 (Tied)				Road Course 1:28:59 (6th)
2017	0:58:36 CR	DNF - Flat Tire				
2018	1:18:41	1:18:41		Third	23:29:40	
2019	1:01:22	1:05:12 CR		28:13		
2020						
2021						Paralympic Time Trial 23:01
WR – World Record; CR – Course record
