= Krisztian Gardos =

Austrian para table tennis player

Personal information
- Born: 6 April 1975 (age 51) Budapest, Hungary

Sport
- Country: Austria
- Sport: Para table tennis
- Disability: Hip osteoarthritis
Medal record
Para table tennis
Representing Austria
Paralympic Games
Bronze medal – third place	2016 Rio de Janeiro	Men's individual C10
World Championships
Bronze medal – third place	2018 Lasko	Men's individual C10

Krisztian Gardos (born 6 April 1975) is a Hungarian-born Austrian para table tennis player. In 2016, he won the bronze medal in the men's individual C10 event at the 2016 Summer Paralympics held in Rio de Janeiro, Brazil. He competed at the 2020 Summer Paralympics in Tokyo, Japan.

He is the older brother of Robert Gardos who is a table tennis player in Austria's national team.
