= Shelley Gautier =

Canadian Paralympic cyclist

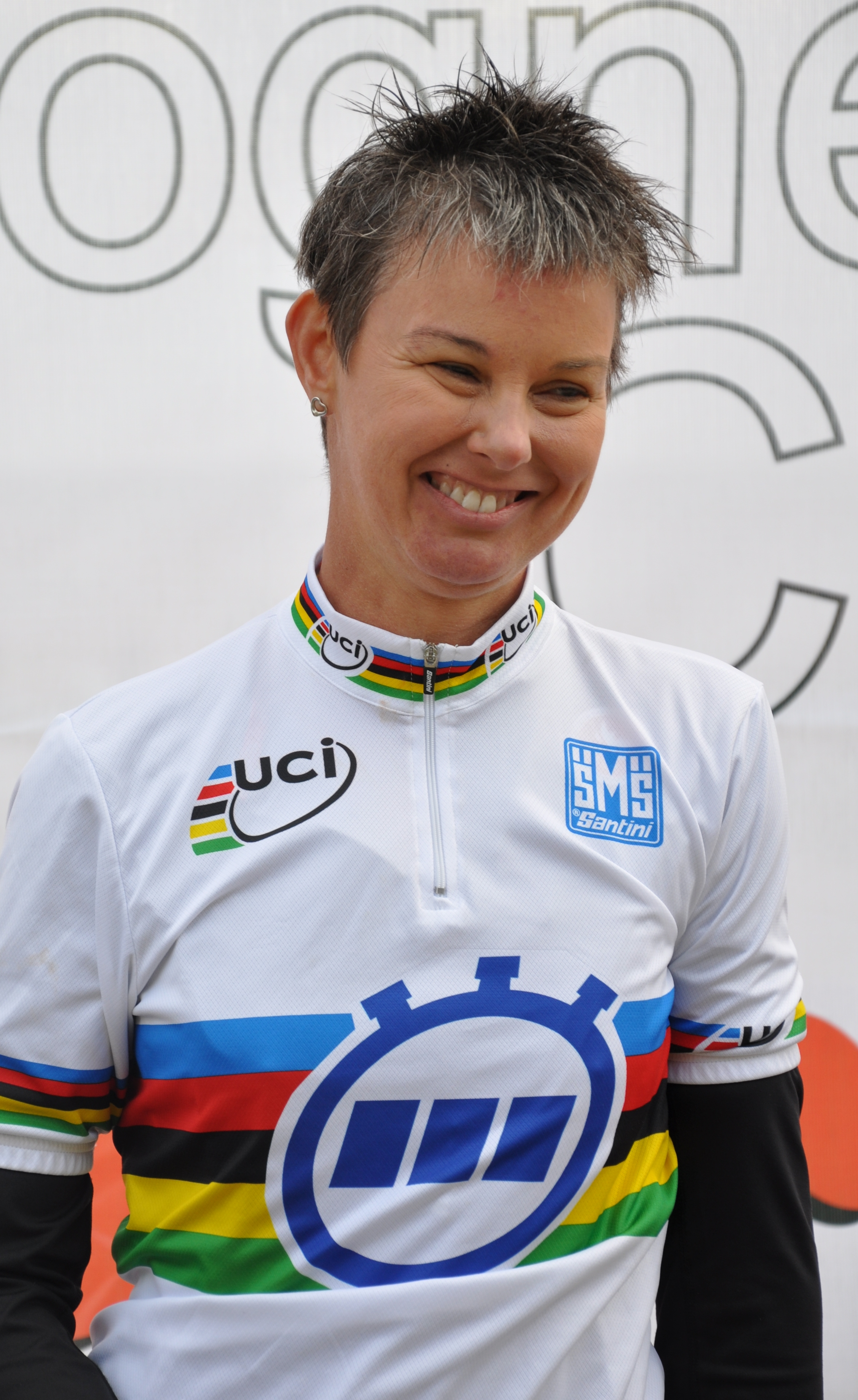

Personal information
- Born: October 31, 1968 (age 58) Niagara Falls, Ontario

Cycling career
- Sport: Cycling
- Role: Rider
Medal record
Para-cycling
Representing Canada
Paralympic Games
| Bronze medal – third place | 2016 Rio | Road time trial T1–2 |
Road World Championships
| Gold medal – first place | 2010 Baie-Comeau | Time trial T1 |
| Gold medal – first place | 2010 Baie-Comeau | Road race T1 |
| Gold medal – first place | 2011 Roskilde | Time trial T1 |
| Gold medal – first place | 2011 Roskilde | Road race T1 |
| Gold medal – first place | 2013 Baie-Comeau | Time trial T1 |
| Gold medal – first place | 2013 Baie-Comeau | Road race T1 |
| Gold medal – first place | 2014 Greenville | Time trial T1 |
| Gold medal – first place | 2014 Greenville | Road race T1 |
| Gold medal – first place | 2015 Nottwil | Time trial T1 |
| Gold medal – first place | 2015 Nottwil | Road race T1 |
| Gold medal – first place | 2017 Pietermaritzburg | Time trial T1 |
| Gold medal – first place | 2017 Pietermaritzburg | Road race T1 |
| Gold medal – first place | 2018 Maniago | Time trial T1 |
| Gold medal – first place | 2018 Maniago | Road race T1 |
| Gold medal – first place | 2021 Cascais | Road race T1 |
| Gold medal – first place | 2021 Cascais | Time trial T1 |
| Silver medal – second place | 2019 Emmen | Road race T1 |
| Bronze medal – third place | 2019 Emmen | Time trial T1 |
| Bronze medal – third place | 2022 Baie-Comeau | Time trial T1 |
| Bronze medal – third place | 2023 Glasgow | Time trial T1 |
| Silver medal – second place | 2023 Glasgow | Road race T1 |
Parapan American Games
| Silver medal – second place | 2011 Guadalajara | Mixed road time Trial T1-2 |
| Silver medal – second place | 2015 Toronto | Mixed road time trial T1-2 |

Shelley Gautier (born 31 October 1968) is a Canadian multi-medalist in para-cycling. At the UCI Para-cycling Road World Championships from 2010 to 2022, Gautier has won 16 golds as part of her 19 medals. At the Parapan American Games, Gautier won a silver at the mixed road time trial event held at the 2011 Parapan American Games and 2015 Parapan American Games. As a Paralympic competitor, Gautier won a bronze at the 2016 Summer Paralympics in the women's time trial event. Apart from para-cycling, Gautier competed in disabled sailing. Gautier was inducted into the Niagara Falls Sports Wall of Fame in 2003 and nominated for the Laureus World Sports Award for Sportsperson of the Year with a Disability in 2015.

== Early life and education ==
Gautier was born on 31 October 1968 in Niagara Falls, Ontario. She went to the University of Western Ontario for an honours degree in physical education before graduating from the University of Toronto with a physical therapy degree.

== Career ==
Gautier began her sports career while in university as a college athlete. After a head injury and coma in 2001, Gautier was diagnosed with hemiparesis on the right side of her body. After her injury, Gautier started competing in disabled sailing before moving on towards para-cycling. During her disabled sailing career, Gautier won the Silver Fleet event at the 2006 Mobility Cup and was the president of the Disabled Sailing Association of Ontario from 2006 to 2007.

In para-cycling, Gautier won repeat golds in the time trial and road race events at the UCI Para-cycling Road World Championships from 2010 to 2015. Gautier continued to win gold at the road race and time trial events at the 2017 UCI Para-cycling Road World Championships and 2018 UCI Para-cycling Road World Championships. During the 2019 UCI Para-cycling Road World Championships, Gautier won silver in the road race and bronze in the time trial. At the 2021 UCI Para-cycling Road World Championships, Gautier won gold in the road race and time trial events. For the 2022 UCI Para-cycling Road World Championships, Gautier won bronze in the time trial and was last in the road race.

Outside of UCI, Gautier won a silver at the 2011 Parapan American Games and 2015 Parapan American Games in the mixed time trial events. After not medalling at the 2012 Summer Paralympics, Gautier received a bronze medal in the women's time trial event at the 2016 Summer Paralympics. Gautier did not win a medal at her events during the 2020 Summer Paralympics. Apart from competitions, the Shelley Gautier Para-Sport Foundation was created by Gautier in the mid-2010s.

== Awards and honours ==
In 2003, Gautier was inducted into the Niagara Falls Sports Wall of Fame as a member of the A. N. Myer Secondary School's soccer team. Gautier was nominated for the Laureus World Sports Award for Sportsperson of the Year with a Disability in 2015 and lost to Tatyana McFadden.
