= Rafał Wilk =

Polish Paralympic cyclist

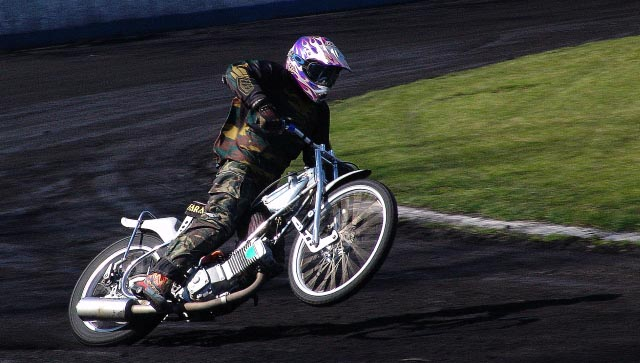
- Wilk as a speedway rider
- Born: 9 December 1974 (age 51); Łańcut, Poland
- Nationality: Polish

Career history

Poland
- 1991–1996, 1999–2000 2002–2004: Rzeszów
- 1997: Łódź
- 1998: Gniezno
- 2001, 2005-2006: Krosno

Denmark
- 2004: Brovst

Rafał Wilk
Medal record

Road cycling

Representing Poland

Paralympic Games
Gold medal – first place	2012 London	Men's road time trial H3
Gold medal – first place	2012 London	Men's road race H3
Gold medal – first place	2016 Rio de Janeiro	Road time trial (H4)
Silver medal – second place	2016 Rio de Janeiro	Road race H4
Bronze medal – third place	2024 Paris	Road race H4

Road World Championships
Gold medal – first place	2015 Nottwil	Time trial (H4)

Rafał Wilk (born 9 December 1974 in Łańcut) is a Paralympic handcyclist and former speedway rider from Poland.

== Career ==
Wilk won two gold medals at the 2012 Summer Paralympics in London. He is now a handcyclist but he used to be a professional speedway rider. He started doing sports in 1991, at the age of 12.

On 3 May 2006, Wilk had an accident during a speedway meeting in Krosno. He injured his spinal cord, and lost control in the lower part of his body. After the accident, he was determined to continue as an athlete, so he took up monoski and went on to practice handbiking. He proved successful in the latter, shortly winning his first Polish championship title. In 2012, during the London Summer Paralympic Games, he won two gold medals in road cycling in the H3 category (handbiking).
