= David Stone (cyclist) =

British para-cyclist

David Stone MBE
Personal information
- Full name: David Robert Stone
- Nationality: English and British
- Born: 30 April 1981 (age 45) Birmingham

Sport
- Sport: Cycling
- Event(s): Road Race and Time Trial
Medal record
Cycling
Paralympic Games
Gold medal – first place	2008 Beijing	Road Race CP1/3
Gold medal – first place	2008 Beijing	Time Trial CP1/3
Gold medal – first place	2012 London	Mixed road race T 1–2
Silver medal – second place	2016 Rio de Janeiro	Road race T 1–2
Bronze medal – third place	2012 London	Mixed Time Trial T 1–2
Bronze medal – third place	2016 Rio de Janeiro	Time trial T 1–2
World Paracycling Championships
Gold medal – first place	2005	Team Sprint
Gold medal – first place	2006	Road Race
Gold medal – first place	2006	Time Trial
Gold medal – first place	2007	Road Race
Gold medal – first place	2007	Time Trial
Gold medal – first place	2010	Road Race
Gold medal – first place	2010	Time Trial
Gold medal – first place	2013	Road Race
Silver medal – second place	2009	Time Trial
Silver medal – second place	2011	Time Trial
Silver medal – second place	2013	Time Trial
Silver medal – second place	2014	Road Race
Silver medal – second place	2016	Road Race
Bronze medal – third place	2005	Road Race
Bronze medal – third place	2005	Time Trial
Bronze medal – third place	2014	Time Trial

David Robert Stone, MBE (born 30 April 1981) is a British para-cyclist.

Stone specialises in the Road Race and Time Trial events, winning gold medals in both events at Paralympic and World Championship level. In the 2009 New Year Honours he was appointed a Member of the Order of the British Empire (MBE).

== Early life ==
David was born in Birmingham in 1981. He started cycling aged 8, and competed in his first race aged 15, when he was spotted by the manager of the Great Britain team.

== Disability ==
David has cerebral palsy. He has described cycling as an outlet of frustration, and a source of freedom and enjoyment.

== Competition record ==
Competition	Event	Result	Medal
2000 Sydney Paralympics	Road Race	7th place	
	Time Trial	7th place	
2005 World Paracycling Championships	Team Sprint	1st Place	Gold medal
	Road Race	3rd Place	Bronze medal
	Time Trial	3rd Place	Bronze medal
2006 World Paracycling Championships	Road Race	1st Place	Gold medal
	Time Trial	1st Place	Gold medal
2007 World Paracycling Championships	Road Race	1st Place	Gold medal
	Time Trial	1st Place	Gold medal
2008 Beijing Paralympics	Road Race CP1/3	1st Place	Gold medal
	Time Trial CP1/3	1st Place	Gold medal
2009 World Paracycling Championships	Time Trial	2nd Place	Silver medal
2010 World Paracycling Championships	Road Race	1st Place	Gold medal
	Time Trial	1st Place	Gold medal
2011 World Paracycling Championships	Road Race	4th place	
	Time Trial	2nd Place	Silver medal
2012 London Paralympics	Road Race	1st Place	Gold medal
	Mixed Time Trial T 1–2	3rd Place	Bronze medal
2013 World Paracycling Championships	Road Race	1st Place	Gold medal
	Time Trial	2nd Place	Silver medal
2014 World Paracycling Championships	Road Race	2nd Place	Silver medal
	Time Trial	3rd Place	Bronze medal
2016 World Paracycling Championships	Road Race	2nd Place	Silver medal
	Time Trial	4th place	

== See also ==
- 2012 Summer Olympics and Paralympics gold post boxes
