= Ryan Boyle (cyclist) =

American tricyclist (born 1993)

Personal information
- Born: 13 November 1993 (age 32) New Haven, Connecticut, United States

Sport
- Sport: Paralympic cycling
Medal record
Representing United States
Paralympic Games
| Silver medal – second place | 2016 Rio de Janeiro | Time trial T1-2 |
Parapan American Games
| Silver medal – second place | 2015 Toronto | Road race T1-2 |
| Bronze medal – third place | 2015 Toronto | Time trial T1-2 |

Ryan Boyle (born November 13, 1993) is an American tricyclist. Boyle won a silver medal at the 2016 Summer Paralympics in his time trial.

== Early life and education ==
Boyle was born on November 13, 1993, to parents Matthew and Nancy Boyle in New Haven, Connecticut alongside his brother Matthew. Growing up, his family went on mountain biking trips to New Hampshire and he began competitive mountain biking and BMX riding circuits. At the age of 10, he suffered a brain injury at the back of his skull as the result of being crushed by the impact of a truck. He was in a coma for two months before waking up and displaying the ability to move one finger on his right hand. Once he could ask his parents about the accident, he laughed hysterically because he did not believe it had happened. As part of his rehabilitation, Boyle joined the Beyond Therapy Program at the Shepherd Center in Atlanta. Upon being transferred to Blythedale Children's Hospital in December 2005, Boyle began intensive therapy that covered speech, feeding, standing, biking, and occupational therapy.

Following his recovery, where he had to relearn how to breathe, talk, eat and walk, Boyle joined a swim team. He swam on his school team until someone gifted him a high-end road tricycle years later. However, upon returning to school, Boyle says he felt alienated by his peers due to his wheelchair. During his freshman year, he wrote When the Lights go Out: A Boy Given a Second Chance. He attended St. Joseph High School before his family moved to Georgia midway through his junior year. Boyle eventually graduated from Blessed Trinity High School in 2011 and enrolled at Berry College. He eventually transferred to Furman University in order to be closer to his coaches.

== Career ==
Boyle was named to the 2016 United States Paralympic Team and he competed in the T1-2 men’s time trial. In his debut, Boyle finished with a time of 26:49.67 earning a silver medal. Following this, Boyle won the 2018 Chelsea Cohen Courage Award. He was again named to the United States Paralympic Team prior to the delayed 2020 Summer Paralympics.

== Selected publications ==
- When the Lights go Out: A Boy Given a Second Chance (2012)
