= T2 (classification) =

Para-cycling classification

T2 is a para-cycling classification. The class is for cyclists with more moderate loss of stability and function compared to T1. It includes people with a variety of different types of disabilities including cerebral palsy. This class uses tricycles (hence the "T" in T2) and competes at the Paralympic Games in road events only and is governed by the Union Cycliste Internationale.

== Definition ==
PBS defined this classification as "T2 is for athletes with more moderate loss of stability and function. " In 1997, this classification was defined by Alison Gray in Against the odds : New Zealand Paralympians as: "partial mobility in arms and trunk". Gray noted this classification was for wheelchair athletes. The Telegraph defined this classification in 2011 as "T 1-2: Athletes on tricycles, who have severe locomotive dysfunctions and limited ability to pedal" The UCI recommends this be coded as MT2 or WT2.

== Disability groups ==
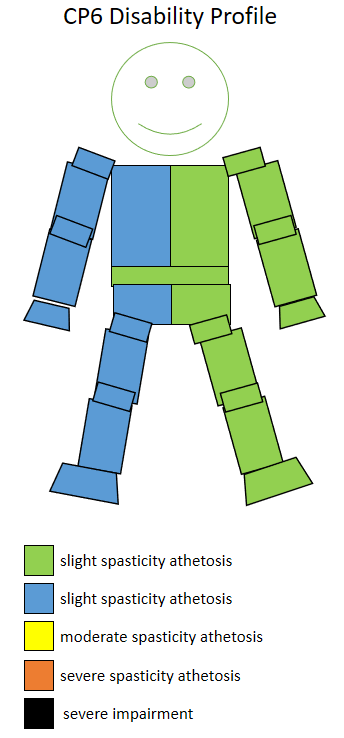
The spasticity athetosis level and location of a CP6 sportsperson.

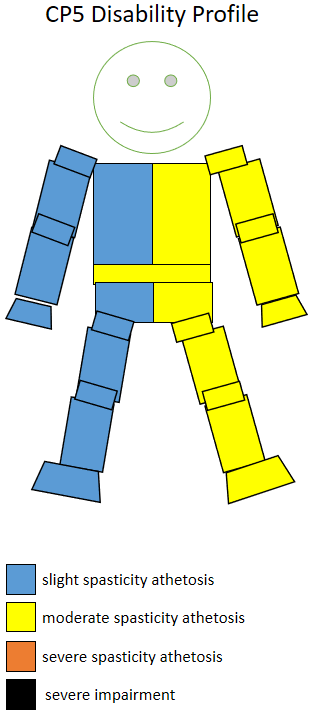
The spasticity athetosis level and location of a CP5 sportsperson.

CP5 and CP6 competitors may compete in the T2 class. Cyclists opting to compete in the T2 class often do so as a result of balance issues, which make riding a standard bicycle or handcycle difficult. Tricyclists are not eligible to compete in track events, only in road events.

== Classification history ==
Cycling first became a Paralympic sport at the 1988 Summer Paralympics. In September 2006, governance for para-cycling, including the responsibility for classification, passed from the International Paralympic Committee's International Cycling Committee to UCI.

== Becoming classified ==
Classification is handled by Union Cycliste Internationale. Classification for the UCI Para-Cycling World Championships is completed by at least two classification panels. Members of the classification panel must not have a relationship with the cyclist and must not be involved in the World Championships in any other role than as classifier. In national competitions, the classification is handled by the national cycling federation. Classification often has three components: physical, technical and observation assessment.

== Competitors ==
Competitors in this classification include David Stone from Great Britain, and Australia's Carol Cooke.

== Rankings ==
This classification has UCI rankings for elite competitors.

== At the Paralympic Games ==
At the 2012 Summer Paralympics, events for this classification include T 1-2 Road Race and Mixed T 1-2 Time Trial.

== See also ==
- Para-cycling classification
- Cycling at the Summer Paralympics
