= Giorgio Farroni =

Italian Paralympic cyclist (born 1976)

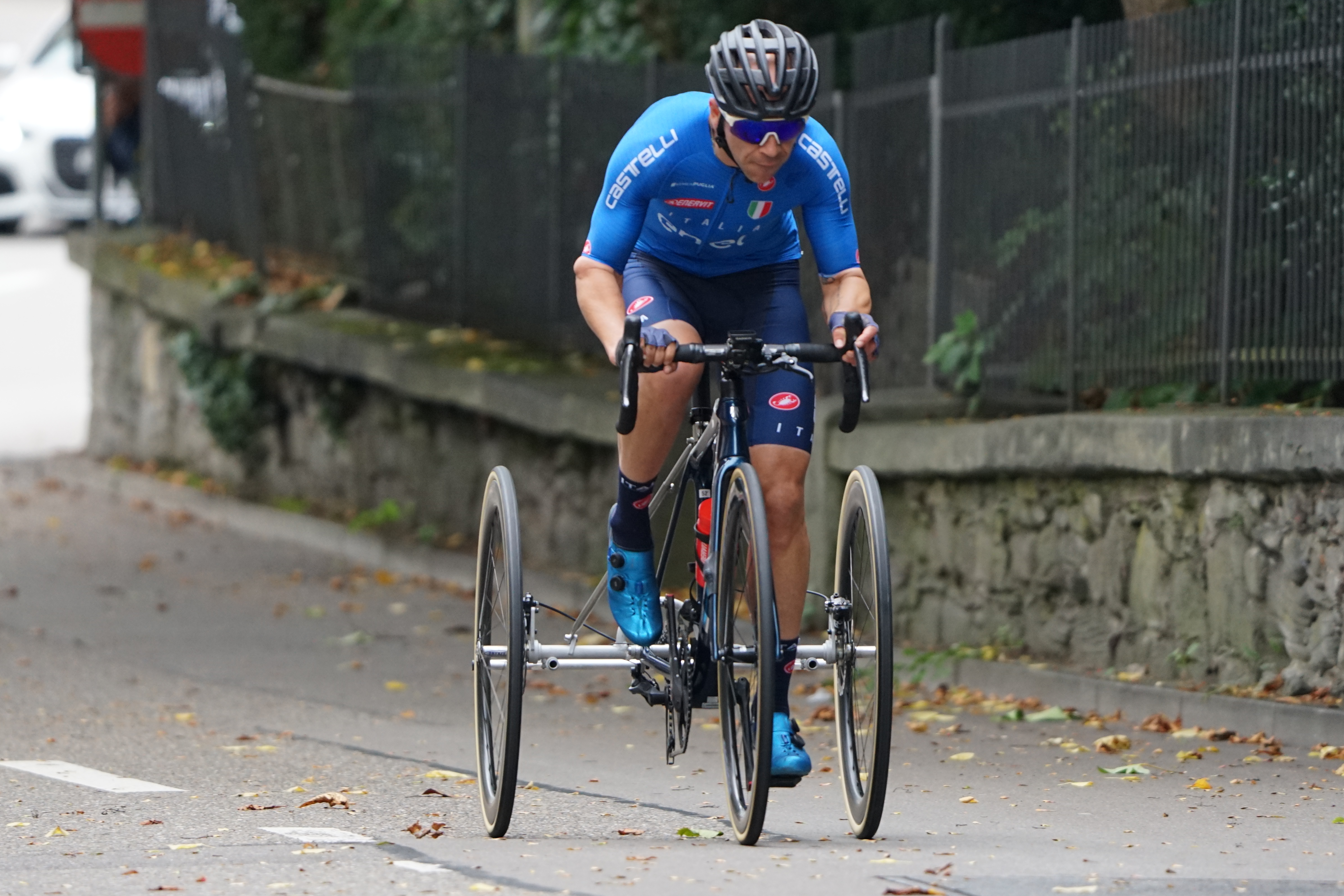
- Giorgio Farroni during the 2024 World Championships

Personal information
- Born: 28 September 1976 (age 49) Fabriano, Italy

Sport
- Country: Italy
- Sport: Para cycling
Medal record
Men's Para-cycling
Representing Italy
World Championships
Gold medal – first place	2025 Ronse	Time trial T1
Gold medal – first place	2025 Ronse	Road race T1
Silver medal – second place	2024 Zurich	Time trial T1
Silver medal – second place	2024 Zurich	Road race T1
European Championships
Gold medal – first place	2023 Rotterdam	Time trial T1
Gold medal – first place	2023 Rotterdam	Road race T1

Giorgio Farroni (born 28 September 1976) is an Italian Paralympic cyclist who has won three medals at the Summer Paralympics.
