= Quentin Aubague =

French Paralympic cyclist (born 1989)

Personal information
- Born: 16 June 1989 (age 37) Decize, France
- Home town: Beaulon, France

Sport
- Country: France
- Sport: Paralympic cycling
Medal record
Paralympic cycling
Representing France
World Championships
Gold medal – first place	2009 Bogogno	Time trial T1
Gold medal – first place	2009 Bogogno	Road race T1
Gold medal – first place	2010 Baie-Comeau	Time trial T1
Gold medal – first place	2010 Baie-Comeau	Road race T1
Gold medal – first place	2011 Roskilde	Time trial T1
Gold medal – first place	2014 Greenville	Time trial T1
Gold medal – first place	2014 Greenville	Road race T1
Gold medal – first place	2015 Nottwil	Time trial T1
Gold medal – first place	2015 Nottwil	Road race T1
Bronze medal – third place	2011 Roskilde	Road race T1

Quentin Aubague (born 16 June 1989) is a French Paralympic cyclist who competes in international road cycling competitions. He is a nine-time World champion. He has competed at the 2012 and 2016 Summer Paralympics and has reached fourth place in the road race at both Games.

Aubague had a cerebral haemorrhage after he was born and had quadriplegia in all four limbs as a result, his parents were told that he will never walk. When he became a toddler, his parents encouraged him to use a tricycle and Aubague started to pedal without any help. He continued his love for cycling into his teens and he often travelled with his father on a tandem and he later ensued his passion into elite tricycle racing, Aubague began his sporting career at the 2009 UCI Para-cycling Road World Championships in Bogogno, Italy and won his first ever medals, two golds in the road race and time trial T1.
