= H4 (classification) =

Para-cycling classification

H4 is a para-cycling classification. The UCI recommends this be coded as MH4 or WH4.

== Definition ==
Union Cycliste Internationale (UCI) defines H4 as:

- Paraplegic with impairments corresponding to a complete lesion from Th11 or below
- No lower limb function or limited function
- Normal or almost normal trunk stability
- Non-spinal cord injury, functional ability profile equivalent to sport class H4 (ex-H3)
- Incomplete loss of lower limb function, functional ability profile equivalent to sport class H4 (ex-H3) or H5 (ex-H4), with other disabilities, which prevent the safe use of a conventional bicycle, tricycle or the Kneeling position in a handbike
- Recumbent position in handbike (AP or ATP-bike)
- Diplegia and athetosis/ataxia/dystonia (almost normal UE) Hemiplegic with spasticity a

minimum of grade 3, lower limb more involved.

== The cycle ==
This classification can use ATP3 knee-seat cycle that is forward leaning on a rigid frame.

== Classification history ==
Cycling first became a Paralympic sport at the 1988 Summer Paralympics. In September 2006, governance for para-cycling passed from the International Paralympic Committee's International Cycling Committee to UCI at a meeting in Switzerland. When this happened, the responsibility of classifying the sport also changed.

For the 2016 Summer Paralympics in Rio, the International Paralympic Committee had a zero classification at the Games policy. This policy was put into place in 2014, with the goal of avoiding last minute changes in classes that would negatively impact athlete training preparations. All competitors needed to be internationally classified with their classification status confirmed prior to the Games, with exceptions to this policy being dealt with on a case-by-case basis.

== Competitors ==
Competitors in this classification include Ernst van Dyk (South Africa), Alex Zanardi (Italy), Andrea Eskau (Germany) and Laura de Vaan (Netherlands).

== Rankings ==
This classification has UCI rankings for elite competitors.

== Events ==
Events for this classification at the include the men's Individual H 4 Road Race, Men's Individual H 4 Time Trial, women's Individual H 4 Road Race, and Women's Individual H 4 Time Trial.

== Becoming classified ==
Classification is handled by Union Cycliste Internationale. Classification for the UCI Para-Cycling World Championships is completed by at least two classification panels. Members of the classification panel must not have a relationship with the cyclist and must not be involved in the World Championships in any other role than as classifier. In national competitions, the classification is handled by the national cycling federation. Classification often has three components: physical, technical and observation assessment.

== See also ==
- Para-cycling classification
- Cycling at the Summer Paralympics
