= Cycling at the 2020 Summer Paralympics – Women's road race =

The women's road race cycling events at the 2020 Summer Paralympics took place from September 1 to 3 at Fuji Speedway, Oyama. Six events took place over twelve classifications.

== Classification ==
Cyclists are given a classification depending on the type and extent of their disability. The classification system allows cyclists to compete against others with a similar level of function. The class number indicates the severity of impairment with "1" being most impaired.

Cycling classes are:

- B: Blind and visually impaired cyclists use a Tandem bicycle with a sighted pilot on the front
- H 1–4: Cyclists with an impairment that affects their legs use a handcycle
- T 1–2: Cyclists with an impairment that affects their balance use a tricycle
- C 1-5: Cyclists with an impairment that affects their legs, arms, and/or trunk but are capable of using a standard bicycle

== Schedule ==
F	Finals

Women's Road Race
Event↓/Date →	1 September	2 September	3 September
B			F
H1-4	F		
H5	F		
C1-3			F
C4-5		F	
T1-2		F	

== Medal table ==
Rank	NPC	Gold	Silver	Bronze	Total
1	Germany	1	2	0	3
1	Great Britain	1	2	0	3
3	United States	1	0	2	3
4	Ireland	1	0	0	1
4	Japan	1	0	0	1
4	Netherlands	1	0	0	1
7	Sweden	0	1	1	2
8	China	0	1	0	1
9	Australia	0	0	1	1
9	France	0	0	1	1
9	Italy	0	0	1	1
Totals (11 entries)		6	6	6	18

== Medal summary ==
Classification	Gold		Silver		Bronze	
B	Ireland; Katie-George Dunlevy pilot: Eve McCrystal	47:32.07	Great Britain; Lora Fachie pilot: Corrine Hall	48:32.06	Sweden; Louise Jannering pilot: Anna Svärdström	49:36.06
H1-4	Jennette Jansen; Netherlands	56:15	Annika Zeyen; Germany	56:21	Alicia Dana; United States	56:24
H5	Oksana Masters; United States	2:23:39	Sun Bianbian; China	2:26:50	Katia Aere; Italy	2:28:11
C1–3	Keiko Sugiura; Japan	1:12:55	Anna Beck; Sweden	1:13:11	Paige Greco; Australia	1:13:11
C4–5	Sarah Storey; Great Britain	2:21:51	Crystal Lane-Wright; Great Britain	2:21:58	Marie Patouillet; France	2:23:49
T1–2	Jana Majunke; Germany	1:00:58	Angelika Dreock-Käser; Germany	1:03:40	Jill Walsh; United States	1:05:48
