= Germany at the 2020 Summer Paralympics =

- Flag of Germany
- IPC code: GER
- NPC: National Paralympic Committee Germany

in Tokyo, Japan August 24, 2021 – September 5, 2021
- Competitors: 134 (76 men and 58 women) in 18 sports
- Flag bearers (opening): Michael Teuber; Mareike Miller
- Flag bearer (closing): Natascha Hiltrop
- Medals Ranked 12th: Gold 13 Silver 12 Bronze 18 Total 43

Summer Paralympics appearances (overview)
- 1960; 1964; 1968; 1972; 1976; 1980; 1984; 1988; 1992; 1996; 2000; 2004; 2008; 2012; 2016; 2020; 2024

Other related appearances
- East Germany (1984)

Germany competed at the 2020 Summer Paralympics in Tokyo, Japan, from 24 August to 5 September 2021. This was their sixteenth consecutive appearance at the Summer Paralympics since 1960.

== Medalists ==
Medal	Name	Sport	Event	Date
Gold	Martin Schulz	Paratriathlon	Men's PTS5	29 August
Gold	Valentin Baus	Table tennis	Men's individual class 5	29 August
Gold	Felix Streng	Athletics	Men's 100 metres T64	30 August
Gold	Annika Zeyen	Cycling	Women's road time trial H1–3	31 August
Gold	Jana Majunke	Cycling	Women's road time trial T1–2	31 August
Gold	Natascha Hiltrop	Shooting	Mixed R3 10 metre air rifle prone SH1	1 September
Gold	Taliso Engel	Swimming	Men's 100 metre breaststroke SB13	1 September
Gold	Elena Krawzow	Swimming	Women's 100 metre breaststroke SB13	1 September
Gold	Markus Rehm	Athletics	Men's long jump T64	1 September
Gold	Jana Majunke	Cycling	Women's road race T1–2	2 September
Gold	Johannes Floors	Athletics	Men's 400 metres T62	3 September
Gold	Edina Müller	Paracanoeing	Women's KL1	4 September
Gold	Lindy Ave	Athletics	Women's 400 metres T38	4 September
Silver	Thomas Schmidberger	Table tennis	Men's individual class 3	28 August
Silver	Léon Schäfer	Athletics	Men's long jump T63	28 August
Silver	Frances Herrmann	Athletics	Women's javelin throw F34	29 August
Silver	Vico Merklein	Cycling	Men's road time trial H4	31 August
Silver	Steffen Warias	Cycling	Men's road time trial C3	31 August
Silver	Irmgard Bensusan	Athletics	Women's 200 metres T64	31 August
Silver	Annika Zeyen	Cycling	Women's road race H1–4	1 September
Silver	Angelika Dreock-Käser	Cycling	Women's road race T1–2	2 September
Silver	Thomas Brüchle; Thomas Schmidberger	Table tennis	Men's team class 3	2 September
Silver	Natascha Hiltrop	Shooting	Women's R8 50 metre 3 positions SH1	3 September
Silver	Irmgard Bensusan	Athletics	Women's 100 metres T64	3 September
Silver	Felix Streng	Athletics	Men's 200 metres T64	4 September
Bronze	Denise Schindler	Cycling	Women's individual pursuit C1–3	25 August
Bronze	Verena Schott	Swimming	Women's 200 metre individual medley SM6	26 August
Bronze	Stephanie Grebe	Table tennis	Women's individual class 6	28 August
Bronze	Verena Schott	Swimming	Women's 100 metre breaststroke SB5	28 August
Bronze	Lindy Ave	Athletics	Women's 100 metres T38	28 August
Bronze	Niko Kappel	Athletics	Men's shot put F41	30 August
Bronze	Regine Mispelkamp	Equestrian	Individual freestyle test grade V	30 August
Bronze	Léon Schäfer	Athletics	Men's 100 metres T63	30 August
Bronze	Johannes Floors	Athletics	Men's 100 metres T64	30 August
Bronze	Kerstin Brachtendorf	Cycling	Women's road time trial C5	31 August
Bronze	Michael Teuber	Cycling	Men's road time trial C1	31 August
Bronze	Sebastian Dietz	Athletics	Men's shot put F36	31 August
Bronze	Matthias Schindler	Cycling	Men's road time trial C3	31 August
Bronze	Angelika Dreock-Käser	Cycling	Women's road time trial T1–2	31 August
Bronze	Thomas Rau; Björn Schnake	Table tennis	Men's team class 6–7	1 September
Bronze	Verena Schott	Swimming	Women's 100 metre backstroke S6	3 September
Bronze	Ali Lacin	Athletics	Men's 200 metres T61	3 September
Bronze	Felicia Laberer	Paracanoeing	Women's KL3	4 September

== Competitors ==
The following is the list of number of competitors participating in the Games:

Sport	Men	Women	Total
Archery	1	0	1
Athletics	13	14	27
Badminton	3	3	6
Boccia	1	0	1
Cycling	7	6	13
Equestrian	1	3	4
Goalball	6	0	6
Judo	2	2	4
Paracanoeing	1	4	5
Paratriathlon	1	0	1
Rowing	1	1	2
Shooting	4	2	6
Sitting volleyball	12	0	12
Swimming	5	6	11
Table tennis	5	3	8
Wheelchair basketball	12	12	24
Wheelchair fencing	1	1	2
Wheelchair tennis	0	1	1
Total	76	58	134

== Archery ==
Germany earned one quota place at the 2019 Para Archery World Championships held in Den Bosch, Netherlands.

Athlete	Event	Ranking round		Round of 32	Round of 16	Quarterfinals	Semifinals	Finals	
Athlete	Event	Score	Seed	Opposition score	Opposition score	Opposition score	Opposition score	Opposition score	Rank
Maik Szarszewski	Men's individual recurve open	569	29	Netsiri (THA); W 6–2	Fabčič (SLO); W 6–0	Singh (IND); L 2–6	Did not advance		

== Athletics ==
Johannes Floors, Niko Kappel, Felix Streng, Markus Rehm, Felix Streng, Sebastian Dietz, Katrin Mueller-Rottgardt, Irmgard Bensusan, Frances Herrmann and Birgit Kober are among the athletes to represent Germany in athletics.

Men's track

Athlete	Event	Heats		Final	
Athlete	Event	Result	Rank	Result	Rank
Alhassane Baldé	800m T54	1:41.10	14	Did not advance	
Alhassane Baldé	1500m T54	2:58.92	10	Did not advance	
Alhassane Baldé	5000m T54	DNF		Did not advance	
David Behre	100m T64	12.10	15	Did not advance	
Marcel Böttger; Guide: Alexander Kosenkow	100m T12	DQ		Did not advance	
Johannes Floors	100m T64	10.78 SB	2 Q	10.79 PR	3rd place, bronze medalist(s)
Johannes Floors	400m T62	—N/a		45.85 SB	1st place, gold medalist(s)
Ali Lacin	200m T61	—N/a		24.64 SB	3rd place, bronze medalist(s)
Léon Schäfer	100m T63	12.32 SB	3 Q	12.22 PB	3rd place, bronze medalist(s)
Felix Streng	100m T64	10.72 PR	1 Q	10.76	1st place, gold medalist(s)
Felix Streng	200m T64	21.98	2 Q	21.78 SB	2nd place, silver medalist(s)

Men's field

Athlete	Event	Final	
Athlete	Event	Result	Rank
Marcel Böttger	Long jump T12	5.61	10
Sebastian Dietz	Shot put F36	14.81 SB	3rd place, bronze medalist(s)
Yannis Fischer	Shot put F40	10.16	6
Niko Kappel	Shot put F41	13.30	3rd place, bronze medalist(s)
Ali Lacin	Long jump T63	6.70 AR	5
Markus Rehm	Long jump T64	8.18	1st place, gold medalist(s)
Léon Schäfer	Long jump T63	7.12 PR	2nd place, silver medalist(s)
Daniel Scheil	Shot put F33	9.86	5
Mathias Schulze	Shot put F46	15.60 PB	5

Women's track

Athlete	Event	Heats		Semi-final		Final	
Athlete	Event	Result	Rank	Result	Rank	Result	Rank
Lindy Ave	100m T38	12.87 PB	3 Q	—N/a		12.77 PB	3rd place, bronze medalist(s)
Lindy Ave	400m T38	1:01.16 PB	1 Q	—N/a		1:00.00 WR	1st place, gold medalist(s)
Irmgard Bensusan	100m T64	13.01	2 Q	—N/a		12.89 PR	2nd place, silver medalist(s)
Irmgard Bensusan	200m T64	26.41 PR	1 Q	—N/a		26.58	2nd place, silver medalist(s)
Janne Sophie Engeleiter	100m T13	12.42 PB	9	—N/a		Did not advance	
Isabelle Foerder	100m T35	15.65	6 Q	—N/a		15.32	4
Isabelle Foerder	200m T35	—N/a				33.05	7
Merle Menje	400m T54	55.24 PB	5 q	—N/a		56.69	8
Merle Menje	800m T54	1:53.06	7 Q	—N/a		1:46.43	4
Merle Menje	1500m T54	3:36.46	9 Q	—N/a		3:28.64	4
Merle Menje	5000m T54	—N/a				11:16.38 PB	6
Nele Moos	100m T38	13.58 PB	10	—N/a		Did not advance	
Nele Moos	400m T38	1:03.07	9	—N/a		Did not advance	
Katrin Mueller-Rottgardt; Guide: Noel-Phillippe Fiener	100m T12	DNS		Did not advance			
Katrin Mueller-Rottgardt; Guide: Noel-Phillippe Fiener	400m T12	DQ		—N/a		Did not advance	
Nicole Nicoleitzik	100m T36	14.84	6 Q	—N/a		14.95	6
Nicole Nicoleitzik	200m T36	31.31	4 Q	—N/a		DQ	
Maria Tietze	100m T64	13.71 SB	12	—N/a		Did not advance	
Maria Tietze	200m T64	27.77 PB	7 Q	—N/a		28.22	7

Women's field

Athlete	Event	Final	
Athlete	Event	Result	Rank
Marie Brämer-Skowronek	Shot put F34	7.73	4
Frances Herrmann	Javelin throw F34	17.72 SB	2nd place, silver medalist(s)
Juliane Mogge	Shot put F36	8.49 SB	4
Lise Petersen	Javelin throw F46	32.46	7
Martina Willing	Javelin throw F56	19.78	5

Mixed track

Athlete	Event	Heats		Final	
Athlete	Event	Result	Rank	Result	Rank
Marcel Böttger; David Behre; Lindy Ave; Merle Menje	4 × 100 metres relay	48.21	5	Did not advance	

== Badminton ==
Germany has qualified a total of six para-badminton players for each of the following events into the Paralympic tournament based on the Para Badminton World Rankings.

Men

Athlete	Event	Group Stage				Quarterfinal	Semifinal	Final / BM	
Athlete	Event	Opposition Score	Opposition Score	Opposition Score	Rank	Opposition Score	Opposition Score	Opposition Score	Rank
Thomas Wandschneider	Singles WH1	Homhual (THA); L (19–21, 21–17, 12–21)	Lee D-s (KOR); L (21–17, 19–21, 17–21)	—N/a	3	Did not advance			
Young-chin Mi	Singles WH1	Murayama (JPN); L (8–21, 7–21)	Lee S-s (KOR); L (18–21, 13–21)	—N/a	3	Did not advance			
Jan-Niklas Pott	Singles SL4	Lalinakere Yathiraj (IND); L (9–21, 3–21)	Mazur (FRA); L (3–21, 7–21)	Susanto (INA); W (21–15, 23–21)	3	—N/a	Did not advance		
Young-chin Mi; Thomas Wandschneider	Doubles WH1–WH2	Qu / Mai (CHN); L (10–21, 8–21)	Murayama / Kajiwara (JPN); L (12–21, 9–21)	—N/a	3	—N/a	Did not advance		

Women

Athlete	Event	Group Stage				Quarterfinal	Semifinal	Final / BM	
Athlete	Event	Opposition Score	Opposition Score	Opposition Score	Rank	Opposition Score	Opposition Score	Opposition Score	Rank
Valeska Knoblauch	Singles WH1	Rongen (GER); W (21–7, 21–8)	Suter-Erath (SUI); L (18–21, 15–21)	—N/a	2 Q	Zhang (CHN); L (16–21, 18–21)	Did not advance		
Elke Rongen	Singles WH1	Knoblauch (GER); L (7–21, 8–21)	Suter-Erath (SUI); L (6–21, 7–21)	—N/a	3	Did not advance			
Katrin Seibert	Singles SL4	Parmar (IND); W (23–21, 19–21, 21–15)	Cheng (CHN); L (5–21, 11–21)	—N/a	2	—N/a	Did not advance		
Valeska Knoblauch; Elke Rongen	Doubles WH1–WH2	Yin / Liu (CHN); L (3–21, 8–21)	Mathez / Suter-Erath (SUI); L (11–21, 11–21)	—N/a	3	—N/a	Did not advance		

Mixed

Athlete	Event	Group Stage			Semifinal	Final / BM	
Athlete	Event	Opposition Score	Opposition Score	Rank	Opposition Score	Opposition Score	Rank
Jan-Niklas Pott; Katrin Seibert	Doubles SL3–SU5	Susanto / Oktila (INA); L (7–21, 17–21)	Fujihara / Sugino (JPN); L (23–25, 11–21)	3	Did not advance		

== Boccia ==
Boris Nicolai qualified for Germany in Individual BC4 events. This is the first time that Germany will compete in this sport.

Athlete	Event	Preliminaries		Round of 16	Quarterfinals	Semifinals	Final	
Athlete	Event	Opponent	Rank	Opposition Score	Opposition Score	Opposition Score	Opposition Score	Rank
Boris Nicolai	Individual BC4	Balcová (SVK); L 1–6	2	Did not advance				
Boris Nicolai	Individual BC4	Chica (COL); W 7–1	2	Did not advance				
Boris Nicolai	Individual BC4	Cely (COL); L 3–5	2	Did not advance				

== Cycling ==
Men's road

Athlete	Event	Time	Rank
Bernd Jeffré	Road race H4	DNF	
Bernd Jeffré	Time trial H4	43:53.61	8
Vico Merklein	Road race H3	DNF	
Vico Merklein	Time trial H3	43:41.06	2nd place, silver medalist(s)
Matthias Schindler	Road race C1–3	2:17:02	13
Matthias Schindler	Time trial C3	36:17.95	3rd place, bronze medalist(s)
Pierre Senska	Road race C1–3	2:29:26	29
Pierre Senska	Time trial C1	26:25.41	4
Michael Teuber	Road race C1–3	2:26:53	24
Michael Teuber	Time trial C1	24:58.67	3rd place, bronze medalist(s)
Steffen Warias	Road race C1–3	2:11:06	7
Steffen Warias	Time trial C3	35:57.41	2nd place, silver medalist(s)

Women's road

Athlete	Event	Time	Rank
Kerstin Brachtendorf	Road race C4–5	2:24:16	5
Kerstin Brachtendorf	Time trial C5	38:34.49	3rd place, bronze medalist(s)
Angelika Dreock-Käser	Road race T1–2	1:03:40	2nd place, silver medalist(s)
Angelika Dreock-Käser	Time trial T1–2	36:53.88	3rd place, bronze medalist(s)
Andrea Eskau	Road race H5	2:47:25	4
Andrea Eskau	Time trial H4–5	50:10.19	5
Jana Majunke	Road race T1–2	1:00:58	1st place, gold medalist(s)
Jana Majunke	Time trial T1–2	36:06.17	1st place, gold medalist(s)
Denise Schindler	Road race C1–3	1:15:38	5
Denise Schindler	Time trial C1–3	28:44.33	9
Annika Zeyen	Road race H1–4	56:21	2nd place, silver medalist(s)
Annika Zeyen	Time trial H1–3	32:46.97	1st place, gold medalist(s)

Mixed road

Athlete	Event	Time	Rank
Bernd Jeffré; Vico Merklein; Annika Zeyen	Team relay H1–5	53:55	4

Men's track

Athlete	Event	Qualification		Final	
Athlete	Event	Time	Rank	Opposition Time	Rank
Kai Kruse piloted by Robert Förstemann	Individual pursuit B	DNF		Did not advance	
Kai Kruse piloted by Robert Förstemann	Time trial B	—N/a		1:00.554	4
Pierre Senska	Individual pursuit C1	3:50.016	6	Did not advance	
Michael Teuber	Individual pursuit C1	3:59.521	8	Did not advance	

Women's track

Athlete	Event	Qualification		Final	
Athlete	Event	Time	Rank	Opposition Time	Rank
Denise Schindler	Individual pursuit C1–3	3:57.625	3 QB	Brown (USA); W 3:55.120	3rd place, bronze medalist(s)

== Equestrian ==
Germany qualified for the 2020 Summer Paralympics after reaching 1st place in the 2018 FEI World Equestrian Games. The team includes Saskia Deutz, Heidemarie Dresing, Regine Mispelkamp and Steffen Zeibig.

Athlete	Horse	Event	Score	Rank
Saskia Deutz	Soyala	Individual championship test grade IV	70.975	6
Saskia Deutz	Soyala	Individual freestyle test grade IV	73.485	6
Heidemarie Dresing	La Boum 20	Individual championship test grade II	72.294	4
Heidemarie Dresing	La Boum 20	Individual freestyle test grade II	74.867	4
Regine Mispelkamp	Highlander Delight's	Individual championship test grade V	73.191	4
Regine Mispelkamp	Highlander Delight's	Individual freestyle test grade V	76.820	3rd place, bronze medalist(s)
Steffen Zeibig	Feel Good 4	Individual championship test grade III	69.323	13
Saskia Deutz; Heidemarie Dresing; Regine Mispelkamp	See above	Team	215.036	7

== Goalball ==
=== Men ===
The following is the Germany roster in the men's goalball tournament of the 2020 Summer Paralympics.

No.	Player	Class	Date of birth (age)
1	Michael Dennis	B2	13 October 1992 (aged 28)
2	Felix Rogge	B3	17 January 1989 (aged 32)
3	Thomas Steiger	B2	31 July 1996 (aged 25)
6	Oliver Hörauf	B2	13 November 1996 (aged 24)
7	Reno Tiede	B2	16 March 1990 (aged 31)
9	Fabian Diehm	B3	6 October 1997 (aged 23)

Group stage

Pos	Team	Pld	W	D	L	GF	GA	GD	Pts	Qualification
1	Belgium	4	2	0	2	18	13	+5	6	Quarter-finals
2	Ukraine	4	2	0	2	18	15	+3	6	Quarter-finals
3	Turkey	4	2	0	2	15	15	0	6	Quarter-finals
4	China	4	2	0	2	21	22	−1	6	Quarter-finals
5	Germany	4	2	0	2	16	23	−7	6	

Source: TOCOG

25 August 2021; 17:30	Germany	6–4	Turkey	Makuhari Messe, Tokyo; Referees: Romualdas Vaitiekus (Lithuania), Reza Dehghan (Iran)
25 August 2021; 17:30	Dennis 4 Hörauf 1 Steiger 1	Report	Karakaya 3 Gündoğdu 1	Makuhari Messe, Tokyo; Referees: Romualdas Vaitiekus (Lithuania), Reza Dehghan (Iran)

26 August 2021; 17:30	Ukraine	11–5	Germany	Makuhari Messe, Tokyo; Referees: Yoshinori Nii (Japan), Vaida Pokvytytė (Lithuania)
26 August 2021; 17:30	Zhyhalin 7 Oliinyk 4	Report	Dennis 3 Rogge 2	Makuhari Messe, Tokyo; Referees: Yoshinori Nii (Japan), Vaida Pokvytytė (Lithuania)

28 August 2021; 19:00	Germany	2–0	Belgium	Makuhari Messe, Tokyo; Referees: Raquel Gomez Aguado (Spain), Vaida Pokvytytė (Lithuania)
28 August 2021; 19:00	Dennis 2	Report		Makuhari Messe, Tokyo; Referees: Raquel Gomez Aguado (Spain), Vaida Pokvytytė (Lithuania)

30 August 2021; 17:30	China	8–3	Germany	Makuhari Messe, Tokyo; Referees: Reza Dehghan (Iran), Romualdas Vaitiekus (Lithuania)
30 August 2021; 17:30	Yang Mingyuan 7 Hu Mingyao 1	Report	Dennis 2 Tiede 1	Makuhari Messe, Tokyo; Referees: Reza Dehghan (Iran), Romualdas Vaitiekus (Lithuania)

== Judo ==
Four German judoka have qualified to compete at the Games.

Men

Athlete	Event	Preliminary	Quarterfinals	Semifinals	Repechage round 1	Repechage round 2	Final/ Bronze medal contest	
Athlete	Event	Opposition Result	Opposition Result	Opposition Result	Opposition Result	Opposition Result	Opposition Result	Rank
Nikolai Kornhass	-73kg	Bye	Daulet (KAZ); L 01–10	Did not advance	Bye	Mahomedov (UKR); L 00–01	Did not advance	
Oliver Upmann	-100kg	Bye	Matsumoto (JPN); W 10–00	Skelley (GBR); L 00–11	Bye		Shevchenko (RPC); L 00–11	5

Women

Athlete	Event	Preliminary	Quarterfinals	Semifinals	Repechage round 1	Repechage round 2	Final/ Bronze medal contest	
Athlete	Event	Opposition Result	Opposition Result	Opposition Result	Opposition Result	Opposition Result	Opposition Result	Rank
Carmen Brussig	-48kg	Potapova (RPC); L 00–01	Did not advance		Tasin (TUR); L 01–11	Did not advance		
Ramona Brussig	-52kg	Bye	Cardoso (BRA); W 10–00	Gagne (CAN); L 00–11	Bye		Nikolaychyk (UKR); L 00–11	5

== Paracanoeing ==
Germany qualified six paracanoeists.

Athlete	Event	Heats		Semifinal		Final	
Athlete	Event	Result	Rank	Result	Rank	Result	Rank
Ivo Kilian	Men's KL2	50.389	6 SF	48.247	6 FB	49.306	13
Tom Kierey	Men's KL3	42.098	3 SF	41.647	3 FA	42.155	6
Edina Müller	Women's KL1	56.391	1 FA	Bye		53.958	1st place, gold medalist(s)
Anja Adler	Women's KL2	55.693	2 SF	54.338	1 FA	54.155	4
Felicia Laberer	Women's KL3	53.022	3 SF	51.049	1 FA	51.868	3rd place, bronze medalist(s)
Katharina Bauernschmidt	Women's VL2	1:05.324	3 SF	1:02.601	2 FA	1:04.023	6

== Paratriathlon ==
Athlete	Event	Swim	Trans 1	Bike	Trans 2	Run	Total time	Rank
Martin Schulz	Men's PTS5	10:28	0:52	28:52	0:47	17:11	58:10	1st place, gold medalist(s)

== Rowing ==
Germany qualified two boats in the single sculls events for the games. Sylvia Pille-Steppat will compete in the women's single sculls by finishing sixth at the 2019 World Rowing Championships in Ottensheim, Austria and securing one of seventh available place. Meanwhile, Marcus Klemp will compete in the men's single sculls events by winning the gold medal at the 2021 Final Paralympic Qualification Regatta in Gavirate, Italy.

Athlete	Event	Heats		Repechage		Final	
Athlete	Event	Time	Rank	Time	Rank	Time	Rank
Marcus Klemp	Men's single sculls	11:10.97	5 R	9:40.05	3 FB	10:32.27	8
Sylvia Pille-Steppat	Women's single sculls	11:39.70	3 R	10:49.78	2 FA	12:02.47	5

Qualification Legend: FA=Final A (medal); FB=Final B (non-medal); R=Repechage

== Shooting ==
Germany entered four athletes into the Paralympic competition. All of them successfully break the Paralympic qualification at the 2018 WSPS World Championships which was held in Cheongju, South Korea, 2018 WSPS World Cup which was held in Châteauroux, France, 2019 WSPS World Cup which was held in Al Ain, United Arab Emirates and 2019 WSPS World Championships which was held in Sydney, Australia.

Athlete	Event	Qualification		Final	
Athlete	Event	Score	Rank	Score	Rank
Bernhard Fendt	Mixed R3 – 10 m air rifle prone SH1	631.1	17	Did not advance	
Bernhard Fendt	Mixed R6 – 50 m rifle prone SH1	616.0	12	Did not advance	
Natascha Hiltrop	Women's R2 – 10 m air rifle standing SH1	616.5	11	Did not advance	
Natascha Hiltrop	Mixed R3 – 10 m air rifle prone SH1	635.4	2 Q	253.1 PR	1st place, gold medalist(s)
Natascha Hiltrop	Mixed R6 – 50 m rifle prone SH1	627.7 QWR	1 Q	184.6	5
Natascha Hiltrop	Women's R8 – 50 m three positions SH1	1157	6 Q	457.1	2nd place, silver medalist(s)
Tobias Meyer	Men's P1 – 10 m air pistol SH1	556	15	Did not advance	
Tobias Meyer	Mixed P4 – 50 m pistol SH1	529	10	Did not advance	
Moritz Alexander Möbius	Mixed P5 – 10 m rifle prone SH2	629.9	27	Did not advance	
Moritz Alexander Möbius	Mixed P9 – 50 m rifle prone SH2	620.5	11	Did not advance	
Elke Seeliger	Mixed R6 – 50 m rifle prone SH1	603.1	45	Did not advance	
Elke Seeliger	Women's R8 – 50 m three positions SH1	1145	10	Did not advance	
Tim Focken	Mixed P9 – 50 m rifle prone SH2	619.0	14	Did not advance	

== Sitting volleyball ==
Germany have qualified to compete at the Games in the sitting volleyball.

Summary

Team	Event	Group stage				Semi-final	Final / BM	
Team	Event	Opposition Score	Opposition Score	Opposition Score	Rank	Opposition Score	Opposition Score	Rank
Germany men's	Men's tournament	Iran; L 0–3	China; L 1–3	Brazil; W 3–1	3	Did not advance	5th Place Match; Egypt; L 2–3	6

=== Men's tournament ===
Group play

Pos	Team	Pld	W	L	Pts	SW	SL	SR	SPW	SPL	SPR	Qualification
1	Iran	3	3	0	3	9	0	MAX	225	177	1.271	Semifinals
2	Brazil	3	1	2	1	4	7	0.571	253	258	0.981	Semifinals
3	Germany	3	1	2	1	4	7	0.571	247	258	0.957	Fifth place match
4	China	3	1	2	1	4	7	0.571	241	273	0.883	Seventh place match

Source: TOCOG

28 August 2021; 10:00 v	Iran	3–0	Germany	Makuhari Messe, Tokyo; Referees: Vanessa Redes (BRA), Khalid Shanishah (LBA)
28 August 2021; 10:00 v	(25–23, 25–16, 25–17); Results Statistics			Makuhari Messe, Tokyo; Referees: Vanessa Redes (BRA), Khalid Shanishah (LBA)

30 August 2021; 14:00 v	Germany	1–3	China	Makuhari Messe, Tokyo; Referees: Kim Jong-heun (KOR), Sari Mannersuo (FIN)
30 August 2021; 14:00 v	(23–25, 25–23, 23–25, 23–25); Results Statistics			Makuhari Messe, Tokyo; Referees: Kim Jong-heun (KOR), Sari Mannersuo (FIN)

31 August 2021; 14:00 v	Brazil	1–3	Germany	Makuhari Messe, Tokyo; Referees: Ebrahim Firouzi (IRI), Haris Helac (BIH)
31 August 2021; 14:00 v	(23–25, 25–22, 19–25, 18–25); Results Statistics			Makuhari Messe, Tokyo; Referees: Ebrahim Firouzi (IRI), Haris Helac (BIH)

Fifth Place Match

2 September 2021; 15:30 v	Egypt	3–2	Germany	Makuhari Messe, Tokyo; Referees: Kim Jong-heun (KOR), Marie-Claude Richer (CAN)
2 September 2021; 15:30 v	(25–23, 24–26, 25–18, 22–25, 15–8); Results Statistics			Makuhari Messe, Tokyo; Referees: Kim Jong-heun (KOR), Marie-Claude Richer (CAN)

== Swimming ==
Men

Athlete	Event	Heats		Final	
Athlete	Event	Result	Rank	Result	Rank
Malte Braunschweig	50m freestyle S9	26.69	15	Did not advance	
Malte Braunschweig	100m backstroke S9	1:08.24	12	Did not advance	
Malte Braunschweig	100m butterfly S9	1:02.10	7 Q	1:02.95	8
Fabian Brune	100m backstroke S6	1:24.13	11	Did not advance	
Taliso Engel	50m freestyle S13	24.70	10	Did not advance	
Taliso Engel	400m freestyle S13	4:21.09	5 Q	4:20.73	6
Taliso Engel	100m breaststroke SB13	1:03.52 WR	1 Q	1:02.97 WR	1st place, gold medalist(s)
Taliso Engel	200m individual medley SM13	2:15.66	6 Q	2:14.05	6
Justin Kaps	100m freestyle S10	57.01	12	Did not advance	
Justin Kaps	400m freestyle S10	4:18.99	7 Q	4:15.85	7
Josia Topf	50m freestyle S3	46.48	1 Q	47.09	5
Josia Topf	200m freestyle S3	3:53.38	8 Q	3:49.44	6
Josia Topf	50m backstroke S3	49.78	6 Q	49.99	7
Josia Topf	150m individual medley SM3	3:16.91	4 Q	3:20.35	6

Women

Athlete	Event	Heats		Final	
Athlete	Event	Result	Rank	Result	Rank
Gina Böttcher	50m freestyle S4	46.33	9	Did not advance	
Gina Böttcher	50m backstroke S4	54.40	6 Q	53.96	6
Gina Böttcher	50m butterfly S5	52.78	11	Did not advance	
Gina Böttcher	50m breaststroke SB3	1:17.41	12	Did not advance	
Gina Böttcher	150m individual medley SM4	3:13.51	10	Did not advance	
Marlene Endrolath	100m butterfly S13	1:15.53	16	Did not advance	
Marlene Endrolath	100m breaststroke SB13	1:21.81	8 Q	1:20.79	8
Marlene Endrolath	200m individual medley SM13	2:38.22	7 Q	2:36.55	7
Elena Krawzow	50m freestyle S13	28.61	12	Did not advance	
Elena Krawzow	100m breaststroke SB13	1:15.31	1 Q	1:13.46	1st place, gold medalist(s)
Mira Jeanne Maack	400m freestyle S8	—N/a		5:12.82	5
Mira Jeanne Maack	100m backstroke S8	—N/a		1:22.77	5
Mira Jeanne Maack	100m breaststroke SB8	DQ		Did not advance	
Mira Jeanne Maack	200m individual medley SM8	3:04.65	5 Q	3:04.78	6
Verena Schott	50m freestyle S6	36.59	12	Did not advance	
Verena Schott	100m backstroke S6	1:23.92	4 Q	1:21.16	3rd place, bronze medalist(s)
Verena Schott	100m breaststroke SB5	1:46.73	5 Q	1:43.61	3rd place, bronze medalist(s)
Verena Schott	50m butterfly S6	38.16	6 Q	37.03	4
Verena Schott	200 metre individual medley SM6	3:04.37	4 Q	2:59.09	3rd place, bronze medalist(s)

== Table tennis ==
Germany entered eight athletes into the table tennis competition at the games. Thomas Schmidberger & Valentin Baus qualified from 2019 ITTF European Para Championships which was held in Helsingborg, Sweden and six other athletes via World Ranking allocation.

Men

Athlete	Event	Group Stage			Round 1	Quarterfinals	Semifinals	Final	
Athlete	Event	Opposition Result	Opposition Result	Rank	Opposition Result	Opposition Result	Opposition Result	Opposition Result	Rank
Thomas Schmidberger	Individual C3	Toporkov (RPC); W 3–0	Baek Y-b (KOR); W 3–0	1 Q	Bye	Zhao P (CHN); W 3–0	Zhai X (CHN); W 3–0	Feng P (CHN); L 2–3	2nd place, silver medalist(s)
Thomas Brüchle	Individual C3	Koleosho (NGR); W 3–0	Petruniv (UKR); W 3–0	1 Q	van Emburgh (USA); L 2–3	Did not advance			
Valentin Baus	Individual C5	Zenaty (EGY); W 3–0	Öztürk (TUR); W 3–2	1 Q	—N/a	Savant-Aira (FRA); W 3–0	Hunter-Spivey (GBR); W 3–0	Cao N (CHN); W 3–2	1st place, gold medalist(s)
Thomas Rau	Individual C6	Thainiyom (THA); L 0–3	Eminović (BIH); W 3–0	2 Q	Seidenfeld (USA); L 1–3	Did not advance			
Björn Schnake	Individual C7	Morales (ESP); L 1–3	Vargas (COL); W 3–2	2 Q	Salmin (BRA); W 3–0	Bayley (GBR); L 0–3	Did not advance		
Thomas Brüchle; Thomas Schmidberger	Team C3	—N/a					Czech Republic; W 2–0	China; L 1–2	2nd place, silver medalist(s)
Thomas Rau; Björn Schnake	Team C6–7	—N/a			Bye	Thailand; W 2–1	China; L 0–2	Did not advance	3rd place, bronze medalist(s)

Women

Athlete	Event	Group Stage			Round 1	Quarterfinals	Semifinals	Final	
Athlete	Event	Opposition Result	Opposition Result	Rank	Opposition Result	Opposition Result	Opposition Result	Opposition Result	Rank
Sandra Mikolaschek	Individual C4	di Toro (AUS); W 3–0	Matić (SRB); W 3–0	1 Q	Bye	Zhang M (CHN); L 1–3	Did not advance		
Stephanie Grebe	Individual C6	Chebanika (RPC); W 3–1	Moon S-k (KOR); W 3–0	1 Q	—N/a	Bye	Alieva (RPC); L 0–3	Did not advance	3rd place, bronze medalist(s)
Juliane Wolf	Individual C8	Mao J (CHN); L 0–3	Tomono (JPN); L 2–3	3	—N/a	Did not advance			
Stephanie Grebe; Juliane Wolf	Team C6–8	—N/a				China; L 0–2	Did not advance		

== Wheelchair basketball ==
Germany men's team qualified for the 2020 Summer Paralympics after entered top four at the 2019 IWBF Men's European Championship.

Germany's women's team qualified for the 2020 Summer Paralympics after winning the bronze medal in the 2018 Wheelchair Basketball World Championship held in Hamburg, Germany.

Summary

Team	Event	Group stage						Quarter-final	Semi-final	Final / BM	
Team	Event	Opposition Score	Opposition Score	Opposition Score	Opposition Score	Opposition Score	Rank	Opposition Score	Opposition Score	Opposition Score	Rank
Germany men's	Men's tournament	United States; L 55–58	Great Britain; W 71–59	Australia; L 53–64	Algeria; W 71–50	Iran; W 56–53	4 Q	Spain; L 68–71	Did not advance	7th Place Match; Canada; W 68–56	7
Germany women's	Women's tournament	Australia; W 77–58	Great Britain; W 53–35	Canada; W 59–57	Japan; W 59–54	—N/a	1 Q	Spain; W 57–33	Netherlands; L 42–52	BM; United States; L 51–64	4

=== Men ===
The following is the Germany roster in the men's wheelchair basketball tournament of the 2020 Summer Paralympics.

Germany men's national wheelchair basketball team - 2020 Summer Paralympics roster
Players
Coaches

No.	Name	Age – Date of birth	Pts.
4	Phillip Schorp	27 – 8 October 1993	1.0
5	Nico Dreimueller	23 – 10 December 1997	2.0
6	Matthias Guentner	22 – 10 November 1998	4.5
7	Christopher Huber	25 – 9 October 1995	1.0
8	Andre Bienek	34 – 31 October 1986	3.0
9	Tobias Hell	21 – 17 May 2000	1.0
10	Jan Haller	32 – 1 October 1988	2.0
11	Jan Sadler	28 – 9 July 1993	3.0
12	Eicke Albrecht Jens	30 – 2 June 1991	3.0
13	Thomas Boehme	30 – 24 June 1991	3.0
14	Aliaksandr Halouski	34 – 30 April 1987	4.5
15	Joseph Bestwick	36 – 1 December 1984	4.5

Head coach

Nicolai Zeltinger

Assistant coach(es)

Martin Kluck

Legend

- Age - describes age on 24 August 2021

Group play

Pos	Team	Pld	W	L	PF	PA	PD	Pts	Qualification
1	Great Britain	5	4	1	332	303	+29	9	Quarter-finals
2	United States	5	4	1	338	223	+115	9	Quarter-finals
3	Australia	5	3	2	335	265	+70	8	Quarter-finals
4	Germany	5	3	2	306	284	+22	8	Quarter-finals
5	Iran	5	1	4	271	318	−47	6	9th/10th place playoff
6	Algeria	5	0	5	202	391	−189	5	11th/12th place playoff

Source: TOCOG
Rules for classification: 1) Points; 2) Head-to-head results; 3) Points difference; 4) Points scored.

26 August 2021
9:00

Report

United States	58–55	Germany
Scoring by quarter: 10–16, 12–12, 18–14, 18–13
Pts: Bell 20; Rebs: Bell 8 Asts: Scott 10		Pts: Böhme 19; Rebs: Böhme 9 Asts: Böhme 7

Ariake Arena
Referees: Linas Radykas

27 August 2021
14:45

Report

Germany	71–59	Great Britain
Scoring by quarter: 13–13, 18–15, 26–15, 14–16
Pts: Böhme 27; Rebs: Böhme 10; Asts: Böhme, Halouski 5		Pts: Choudhry 14; Rebs: Manning 10; Asts: Warburton 13

Musashino Forest Sport Plaza
Attendance: 8
Referees: Alexandre Lapointe

28 August 2021
11:15

Report

Australia	64–53	Germany
Scoring by quarter: 21–11, 7–11, 20–19, 16–12
Pts: Latham 17; Rebs: Latham 11; Asts: Norris 10		Pts: Halouski 13; Rebs: Bienek 9 Asts: Halouski 8

Ariake Arena
Referees: Adam Fronczak

29 August 2021
14:45

Report

Germany	71–50	Algeria
Scoring by quarter: 18–13, 19–12, 16–19, 18–6
Pts: Böhme 21; Rebs: Böhme 11; Asts: Böhme 8		Pts: Badrane, Megueddem 11; Rebs: Zidi 9 Asts: Zidi 4

Ariake Arena
Referees: Hector Carmona

30 August 2021
11:30

Report

Germany	56–53	Iran
Scoring by quarter: 16–13, 13–12, 18–8, 9–20
Pts: Halouski 27; Rebs: Halouski 15; Asts: Böhme 7		Pts: Sayari 16; Rebs: Sayari 15; Asts: Sayari 8

Ariake Arena
Referees: Juan Urunuela

Quarter-final

1 September 2021
15:00

Report

Spain	71–68	Germany
Scoring by quarter: 21–19, 19–15, 14–14, 17–20
Pts: Ruiz 24; Rebs: García 16; Asts: García 13		Pts: Böhme 16; Rebs: Böhme 8 Asts: Halouski 8

Ariake Arena
Referees: Matias Quintana

Seventh place match

3 September 2021
12:30

Report

Germany	68–56	Canada
Scoring by quarter: 19–21, 18–10, 13–10, 18–15
Pts: Halouski 20; Rebs: Bienek 11; Asts: Böhme, Halouski 6		Pts: Hedges 16; Rebs: Goncin 14; Asts: Goncin 11

Ariake Arena
Referees: Hsieh Shu-fei

=== Women ===
The following is the Germany roster in the women's wheelchair basketball tournament of the 2020 Summer Paralympics.

Germany women's national wheelchair basketball team - 2020 Summer Paralympics roster
Players
Coaches

No.	Name	Age – Date of birth	Pts.
4	Johanna Welin-Ryklin	31 – 3 August 1990	4.5
5	Mareike Miller	37 – 24 June 1984	2.0
6	Catharina Weiss	21 – 2 June 2000	1.0
7	Anne Patzwald	32 – 2 July 1989	1.0
8	Katharina Lang	28 – 2 January 1993	4.5
9	Laura Fuerst	30 – 23 April 1991	2.0
10	Lisa Bergenthal	21 – 30 November 1999	3.5
11	Maya Lindholm	30 – 20 December 1990	2.5
12	Annabel Breuer	28 – 23 October 1992	1.5
13	Svenja Mayer	30 – 21 May 1991	2.5
14	Lena Knippelmeyer	31 – 6 April 1990	4.5
15	Barbara Gross	27 – 20 November 1993	4.5

Head coach

Dennis Nohl

Assistant coach(es)

Andre Hopp

Legend

- Age - describes age on 24 August 2021

Group play

Pos	Team	Pld	W	L	PF	PA	PD	Pts	Qualification
1	Germany	4	4	0	248	204	+44	8	Quarter-finals
2	Canada	4	3	1	267	185	+82	7	Quarter-finals
3	Japan (H)	4	2	2	216	215	+1	6	Quarter-finals
4	Great Britain	4	1	3	212	218	−6	5	Quarter-finals
5	Australia	4	0	4	180	301	−121	4	9th/10th place playoff

Source: TOCOG
Rules for classification: 1) Points; 2) Head-to-head results; 3) Points difference; 4) Points scored.
(H) Hosts

26 August 2021
9:00

Report

Germany	77–58	Australia
Scoring by quarter: 24–13, 21–12, 7–14, 25–19
Pts: Miller 30; Rebs: Miller 11; Asts: Lang, Miller 8		Pts: Merritt 27; Rebs: Merritt 10; Asts: Merritt 6

Musashino Forest Sport Plaza
Attendance: 360
Referees: Hsieh Shu-fei

27 August 2021
20:30

Report

Great Britain	35–53	Germany
Scoring by quarter: 7–18, 10–12, 4–8, 14–15
Pts: Love 8 Rebs: Love 8 Asts: Freeman 6		Pts: Miller 21; Rebs: Miller 18; Asts: Lang 9

Musashino Forest Sport Plaza
Referees: Shunsuke Nikaido

28 August 2021
17:00

Report

Germany	59–57	Canada
Scoring by quarter: 19–12, 14–11, 15–15, 11–19
Pts: Miller 19; Rebs: Miller 15; Asts: Miller 8		Pts: Dandeneau 23; Rebs: Dandeneau 9 Asts: Young 6

Ariake Arena
Referees: Helen Rosenberg

29 August 2021
11:15

Report

Japan	54–59	Germany
Scoring by quarter: 12–9, 14–13, 16–15, 12–22
Pts: Fujii 16; Rebs: Amimoto 8 Asts: Amimoto, Hagino 4		Pts: Lang 27; Rebs: Lang 17; Asts: Lang 8

Ariake Arena
Referees: Gustavo Mathias

Quarter-final

31 August 2021
15:00

Report

Germany	57–33	Spain
Scoring by quarter: 16–13, 8–6, 19–5, 14–9
Pts: Lang 14; Rebs: Miller 10; Asts: Lang, Miller 7		Pts: Perez 13; Rebs: Lopez 9 Asts: S. Ruiz 5

Ariake Arena
Referees: Helen Rosenberg

Semi-final

2 September 2021
18:15

Report

Germany	42–52	Netherlands
Scoring by quarter: 12–16, 13–10, 11–9, 6–17
Pts: Lang 18; Rebs: Lang 8 Asts: Lang 5		Pts: Beijer 30; Rebs: Beijer 19; Asts: Visser 6

Ariake Arena
Attendance: 279
Referees: Sebastien Gauthier

Bronze medal match

4 September 2021
17:45

Report

Germany	51–64	United States (bronze)
Scoring by quarter: 13–20, 12–11, 14–13, 12–20
Pts: Miller 26; Rebs: Lang 11; Asts: Miller 8		Pts: Zurbrugg 22; Rebs: Hollermann 12; Asts: Hollermann 10

Ariake Arena
Attendance: 30
Referees: Shunsuke Nikaido

== Wheelchair fencing ==
Maurice Schmidt and Sylvi Tauber have been selected to compete.

Men

Athlete	Event	Group Stage							Round of 16	Quarterfinals	Semifinals	Final	
Athlete	Event	Opposition Result	Opposition Result	Opposition Result	Opposition Result	Opposition Result	Opposition Result	Rank	Opposition Result	Opposition Result	Opposition Result	Opposition Result	Rank
Maurice Schmidt	Épée A	Rousell (CAN); W 5–2	Lambertini (ITA); L 2–5	Shaburov (RPC); L 3–5	Akkaya (TUR); W 5–3	Tian J (CHN); L 1–5	Al-Madhkhoori (IRQ); L 2–5	10 Q	Al-Madhkhoori (IRQ); L 13–15	Did not advance			
Maurice Schmidt	Sabre A	Demchuk (UKR); L 3–5	Giordan (ITA); L 3–5	Li H (CHN); W 5–3	Rousell (CAN); W 5–2	—N/a		7 Q	Demchuk (UKR); L 14–15	Did not advance			

Women

Athlete	Event	Group Stage							Round of 16	Quarterfinals	Semifinals	Final	
Athlete	Event	Opposition Result	Opposition Result	Opposition Result	Opposition Result	Opposition Result	Opposition Result	Rank	Opposition Result	Opposition Result	Opposition Result	Opposition Result	Rank
Sylvi Tauber	Foil B	Makrytskaya (BLR); L 2–5	Geddes (USA); W 5–3	Mishurova (RPC); L 4–5	Mezo (HUN); L 2–5	Sakurai (JPN); L 4–5	Zhou J (CHN); L 1–5	12	Did not advance				
Sylvi Tauber	Sabre B	Xiao R (CHN); L 4–5	Jana (THA); L 4–5	Khetsuriani (GEO); L 2–5	Pasquino (ITA); L 4–5	Hayes (USA); W 5–1	—N/a	9 Q	Mishurova (RPC); W 15–14	Fedota (UKR); L 9–15	Did not advance		

== Wheelchair tennis ==
Athlete	Event	Round of 64	Round of 32	Round of 16	Quarterfinals	Semifinals	Final / BM	
Athlete	Event	Opposition Result	Opposition Result	Opposition Result	Opposition Result	Opposition Result	Opposition Result	Rank
Katharina Krüger	Women's singles	—N/a	van Koot (NED); L 3–6, 1–6	Did not advance				

== See also ==
- Germany at the Paralympics
- Germany at the 2020 Summer Olympics
