= Cycling at the 2024 Summer Paralympics – Women's road time trial H4–5 =

Women's road time trial H4–5 at the XVII Paralympic Games
- Venue: Clichy-sous-Bois
- Dates: 4 September
- Competitors: 13 from 9 nations
- Winning time: 23:45.20

Medalists
1st place, gold medalist(s)		Oksana Masters	United States
2nd place, silver medalist(s)		Chantal Haenen	Netherlands
3rd place, bronze medalist(s)		Sun Bianbian	China

The Women's time trial H4–5 road cycling event at the 2024 Summer Paralympics took place on 4 September 2024, at Clichy-sous-Bois, Paris. 13 riders competed in the event.

The H4-5 classifications are for hand cyclists with the mildest level of impairment. As this is a composite classification event, times are factored.

== Results ==
Rank	Rider	Nationality	Class	r.t.	Factor	Result	n.d.	Notes
1st place, gold medalist(s)	Oksana Masters	United States	H5	23:45.20	100%	23:45.20		
2nd place, silver medalist(s)	Chantal Haenen	Netherlands	H5	23:51.44	100%	23:51.44	+00:06.24	
3rd place, bronze medalist(s)	Sun Bianbian	China	H5	25:13.07	100%	25:13.07	+01:27.87	
4	Jennette Jansen	Netherlands	H4	25:46.87	100%	25:46.87	+02:01.67	
5	Ana Maria Vitelaru	Italy	H5	26:16.93	100%	26:16.93	+02:31.73	
6	Andrea Eskau	Germany	H5	26:35.88	100%	26:35.88	+02:50.68	
7	Katia Aere	Italy	H5	27:07.35	100%	27:07.35	+03:22.15	
8	Svetlana Moshkovich	Austria	H4	27:15.05	100%	27:15.05	+03:29.85	
9	Suzanna Tangen	Norway	H4	27:37.70	100%	27:37.70	+03:52.50	
10	Sandra Stoeckli	Switzerland	H4	28:28.29	100%	28:28.29	+04:43.09	
11	Lee Do-yeon	South Korea	H4	28:36.01	100%	28:36.01	+04:50.81	
12	Giulia Ruffato	Italy	H4	28:40.43	100%	28:40.43	+04:55.23	
13	Cornelia Wibmer	Austria	H4	34:31.97	100%	34:31.97	+10:46.77	
