= Cycling at the 2020 Summer Paralympics – Women's road time trial H4–5 =

Women's road time trial H4–5 at the XVI Paralympic Games
- Venue: Fuji Speedway
- Dates: 31 August
- Competitors: 12 from 9 nations
- Winning time: 45:40.05

Medalists
1st place, gold medalist(s)		Oksana Masters	United States
2nd place, silver medalist(s)		Sun Bianbian	China
3rd place, bronze medalist(s)		Jennette Jansen	Netherlands

The women's road time trial H4–5 road cycling event at the 2020 Summer Paralympics took place on 31 August 2021, at Fuji Speedway, Tokyo. 12 riders competed in the event.

The event covers the following two classifications, that both use hand-operated bicycles:

- H4: paraplegics with impairment from T11 down, and amputees unable to kneel.
- H5: athletes who can kneel on a handcycle, a category that includes paraplegics and amputees.

== Results ==
The event took place on 31 August 2021, at 9:59:

Rank	Rider	Nationality	Class	Time	Deficit
1st place, gold medalist(s)	Oksana Masters	United States	H5	45:40.05	
2nd place, silver medalist(s)	Sun Bianbian	China	H5	47:26.53	+1:46.48
3rd place, bronze medalist(s)	Jennette Jansen	Netherlands	H4	48:45.69	+3:05.64
4	Chantal Haenen	Netherlands	H5	49:15.28	+3:35.23
5	Andrea Eskau	Germany	H5	50:10.19	+4:30.14
6	Katia Aere	Italy	H5	50:40.24	+5:00.19
7	Ana Maria Vitelaru	Italy	H5	50:58.69	+5:18.64
8	Sandra Stöckli	Switzerland	H4	52:44.91	+7:04.86
9	Svetlana Moshkovich	RPC	H4	52:47.14	+7:07.09
10	Lee Do-yeon	South Korea	H4	55:42.91	+10:02.86
11	Sandra Graf	Switzerland	H4	55:45.74	+10:05.69
12	Suzanna Tangen	Norway	H4	57:38.97	+11:58.92
