= Cycling at the 2024 Summer Paralympics – Women's road race H5 =

Women's road race H5 at the XVII Paralympic Games
- Dates: 5 September
- Competitors: 6 from 5 nations
- Winning time: 1:54:24

Medalists
1st place, gold medalist(s)		Oksana Masters	United States
2nd place, silver medalist(s)		Sun Bianbian	China
3rd place, bronze medalist(s)		Ana Maria Vitelaru	Italy

The women's road race H5 cycling event at the 2024 Summer Paralympics took place on 5 September 2024. 6 riders from 5 nations competed in the event.

== Schedule ==
F	Finals

Women's Road Race
Event↓/Date →	5 September	6 September	7 September
B		F	
H1-4	F		
H5	F		
C1-3			F
C4-5		F	
T1-2			F

== Results ==
Rank	Rider	Nationality	Class	Time	Gap	Notes
1st place, gold medalist(s)	Oksana Masters	United States	(H5)	1:53:14		
2nd place, silver medalist(s)	Bianbian Sun	China	(H5)	1:52:25	+11	
3rd place, bronze medalist(s)	Ana Maria Vitelaru	Italy	(H5)	1:52:27	+13	
4	Andrea Eskau	Germany	(H5)	1:52:47	+33	
5	Katia Aere	Italy	(H5)	1:59:01	+6:47	
—	Chantal Haenen	Netherlands	(H5)	DNF		
