= 2021 UCI Para-cycling Road World Championships =

- Venue: Cascais, Portugal
- Date(s): 9–13 June 2021
- Nations participating: 39
- Cyclists participating: 270
- Events: 51

The 2021 UCI Para-cycling Road World Championships was tenth edition of the World Championships for road cycling for athletes with a physical disability. The Championships took place in Cascais in Portugal from 9 to 13 June 2021.

== Medalists ==
| Event | Class | Gold | | Silver | | Bronze | |
|---|---|---|---|---|---|---|---|
Men's events
| 16.8 km time trial | H1 | Fabrizio Cornegliani; Italy | 36' 44.80" | Pieter du Preez; South Africa | + 1' 41.62" | Maxime Hordies; Belgium | + 3' 16.99" |
| 16.8 km time trial | H2 | Luca Mazzone; Italy | 27' 41.20" | Sergio Garrote; Spain | + 36.79" | Florian Jouanny; France | + 2' 09.68" |
| 16.8 km time trial | T1 | Giorgio Farroni; Italy | 31' 33.94" | Gonzalo García; Spain | + 1' 10.47" | Petr Berger; Czech Republic | + 5' 38.30" |
| 16.8 km time trial | T2 | Joan Reinoso; Spain | 28' 33.12" | Matthew Rodriguez; United States | + 28.45" | Dennis Connors; United States | + 43.57" |
| 16.8 km time trial | C1 | Ricardo Ten; Spain | 24' 31.64" | Mikhail Astashov; RPC | + 5.01" | Michael Teuber; Germany | + 36.26" |
| 25.2 km time trial | H3 | Paolo Cecchetto; Italy | 37' 59.20" | Luis García-Marquina; Spain | + 24.00" | Vico Merklein; Germany | + 51.80" |
| 25.2 km time trial | H4 | Jetze Plat; Netherlands | 35' 27.10" | Thomas Frühwirth; Austria | + 35.57" | Alexander Gritsch; Austria | + 1' 34.16" |
| 25.2 km time trial | H5 | Mitch Valize; Netherlands | 36' 01.84" | Loïc Vergnaud; France | + 21.73" | Gary O'Reilly; Ireland | + 54.90" |
| 25.2 km time trial | C2 | Alexandre Léauté; France | 35' 09.88" | Maurice Eckhard; Spain | + 10.81" | Arslan Gilmutdinov; RPC | + 38.44" |
| 33.6 km time trial | C3 | Florian Bouziani; France | 48' 14.26" | Matthias Schindler; Germany | + 1.63" | Alejandro Perea; Colombia | + 49.14" |
| 33.6 km time trial | C4 | George Peasgood; Great Britain | 45' 02.52" | Cody Jung; United States | + 1' 45.27" | Diego Germán Dueñas; Colombia | + 2' 21.39" |
| 33.6 km time trial | C5 | Daniel Abraham; Netherlands | 43' 22.98" | Dorian Foulon; France | + 2.43" | Lauro Chaman; Brazil | + 2.65" |
| 33.6 km time trial | Tandem B | Great Britain; Stephen Bate; Adam Duggleby (pilot) | 41' 11.60" | France; Alexandre Lloveras; Corentin Ermenault (pilot) | + 8.03" | Netherlands; Vincent ter Schure; Timo Fransen (pilot) | + 8.10" |
| 25.2 km road race | T1 | Giorgio Farroni; Italy | 49' 30" | Gonzalo García; Spain | + 3' 43" | Petr Berger; Czech Republic | + 7' 57" |
| 33.6 km road race | T2 | Tim Celen; Belgium | 1h 01' 12" | Juan José Betancourt Quiroga; Colombia | s.t. | Joan Reinoso; Spain | + 2" |
| 50.4 km road race | H1 | Pieter du Preez; South Africa | 1h 38' 06" | Fabrizio Cornegliani; Italy | s.t. | Maxime Hordies; Belgium | s.t. |
| 50.4 km road race | H2 | Luca Mazzone; Italy | 1h 29' 04" | Sergio Garrote; Spain | + 4" | Florian Jouanny; France | + 2' 03" |
| 67.2 km road race | H3 | Riadh Tarsim; France | 1h 48' 29" | Vico Merklein; Germany | s.t. | Luis García-Marquina; Spain | s.t. |
| 67.2 km road race | H4 | Jetze Plat; Netherlands | 1h 37' 48" | Thomas Frühwirth; Austria | + 28" | Fabian Recher; Switzerland | + 3' 44" |
| 67.2 km road race | H5 | Mitch Valize; Netherlands | 1h 46' 26" | Loïc Vergnaud; France | s.t. | Tim de Vries; Netherlands | + 1' 34" |
| 67.2 km road race | C1 | Pierre Senska; Germany | 1h 46' 16" | Ricardo Ten; Spain | s.t. | Mikhail Astashov; RPC | s.t. |
| 67.2 km road race | C2 | Alexandre Léauté; France | 1h 40' 05" | Arslan Gilmutdinov; RPC | + 24" | Ewoud Vromant; Belgium | + 2' 05" |
| 67.2 km road race | C3 | Fabio Anobile; Italy | 1h 50' 56" | Stijn Boersma; Netherlands | s.t. | Finlay Graham; Great Britain | s.t. |
| 92.4 km road race | C4 | Patrik Kuril; Slovakia | 2h 05' 49" | George Peasgood; Great Britain | + 4" | Ronan Grimes; Ireland | + 2' 47" |
| 92.4 km road race | C5 | Lauro Chaman; Brazil | 2h 05' 47" | Yehor Dementyev; Ukraine | s.t. | Kévin Le Cunff; France | + 1' 20" |
| 117.6 km road race | Tandem B | Spain; Christian Venge; Noel Martín (pilot) | 2h 33' 04" | Netherlands; Vincent ter Schure; Timo Fransen (pilot) | s.t. | Netherlands; Tristan Bangma; Patrick Bos (pilot) | s.t. |
Women's events
| 16.8 km time trial | H1 | Simona Canipari; Italy | 1h 00' 08.69" | | | | |
| 16.8 km time trial | H2 | Roberta Amadeo; Italy | 41' 10.14" | | | | |
| 16.8 km time trial | H3 | Francesca Porcellato; Italy | 28' 38.17" | Annika Zeyen; Germany | + 21.20" | Renata Kałuża; Poland | + 1' 00.93" |
| 16.8 km time trial | H4 | Jennette Jansen; Netherlands | 27' 49.42" | Svetlana Moshkovich; RPC | + 1' 25.43" | Sandra Graf; Switzerland | + 1' 46.90" |
| 16.8 km time trial | H5 | Chantal Haenen; Netherlands | 28' 59.12" | Ana Maria Vitelaru; Italy | + 23.28" | Katia Aere; Italy | + 1' 25.05" |
| 16.8 km time trial | T1 | Shelley Gautier; Canada | 40' 24.19" | Yulia Sibagatova; RPC | + 2' 05.40" | | |
| 16.8 km time trial | T2 | Angelika Dreock-Käser; Germany | 33' 31.10" | Jana Majunke; Germany | + 7.88" | Jill Walsh; United States | + 21.86" |
| 16.8 km time trial | C2 | Daniela Munévar; Colombia | 28' 43.40" | Maike Hausberger; Germany | + 25.42" | Flurina Rigling; Switzerland | + 38.75" |
| 16.8 km time trial | C3 | Anna Beck; Sweden | 26' 34.60" | Élise Marc; France | + 30.00" | Denise Schindler; Germany | + 1' 13.01" |
| 25.2 km time trial | C4 | Marie-Claude Molnar; Canada | 41' 49.47" | Katell Alençon; France | + 2' 06.77" | Elena Galkina; RPC | + 2' 35.93" |
| 25.2 km time trial | C5 | Sarah Storey; Great Britain | 35' 47.24" | Crystal Lane-Wright; Great Britain | + 46.09" | Kerstin Brachtendorf; Germany | + 2' 05.06" |
| 33.6 km time trial | Tandem B | Great Britain; Lora Fachie; Corrine Hall (pilot) | 48' 28.38" | Ireland; Katie-George Dunlevy; Eve McCrystal (pilot) | + 30.72" | Poland; Dominika Putyra; Ewa Bańkowska (pilot) | + 1' 37.22" |
| 25.2 km road race | T1 | Shelley Gautier; Canada | 1h 05' 27" | Yulia Sibagatova; RPC | + 2' 44" | | |
| 33.6 km road race | T2 | Jana Majunke; Germany | 1h 07' 06" | Jill Walsh; United States | s.t. | Angelika Dreock-Käser; Germany | s.t. |
| 42.0 km road race | H1 | Simona Canipari; Italy | 1h 46' 23" | | | | |
| 42.0 km road race | H2 | Roberta Amadeo; Italy | 1h 41' 15" | | | | |
| 58.8 km road race | H3 | Annika Zeyen; Germany | 1h 50' 56" | Francesca Porcellato; Italy | s.t. | Renata Kałuża; Poland | + 9" |
| 58.8 km road race | H4 | Jennette Jansen; Netherlands | 1h 49' 49" | Sandra Stöckli; Switzerland | + 2' 03" | Silke Pan; Switzerland | + 2' 18" |
| 58.8 km road race | H5 | Chantal Haenen; Netherlands | 2h 03' 33" | Ana Maria Vitelaru; Italy | s.t. | Katia Aere; Italy | + 4" |
| 58.8 km road race | C2 | Maike Hausberger; Germany | 1h 43' 31" | Flurina Rigling; Switzerland | + 4" | Daniela Munévar; Colombia | + 3' 10" |
| 58.8 km road race | C3 | Anna Beck; Sweden | 1h 40' 07" | Denise Schindler; Germany | s.t. | Daphne Schrager; Great Britain | + 3' 30" |
| 67.2 km road race | C4 | Marie-Claude Molnar; Canada | 1h 56' 17" | Elena Galkina; RPC | + 5' 24" | Katell Alençon; France | + 7' 33" |
| 67.2 km road race | C5 | Sarah Storey; Great Britain | 1h 52' 01" | Kerstin Brachtendorf; Germany | s.t. | Alina Punina; RPC | s.t. |
| 100.8 km road race | Tandem B | Great Britain; Sophie Unwin; Jenny Holl (pilot) | 2h 34' 34" | Ireland; Katie-George Dunlevy; Eve McCrystal (pilot) | s.t. | Great Britain; Lora Fachie; Corrine Hall (pilot) | s.t. |
Mixed events
| Team Relay | H1-5 | Italy; Diego Colombari (H5); Luca Mazzone (H2); Paolo Cecchetto (H3) | 23' 29" | Spain; Israel Rider (H3); Sergio Garrote (H2); Luis Miguel García-Marquina (H3) | + 17" | Germany; Annika Zeyen (H3); Bernd Jeffré (H4); Vico Merklein (H3) | + 38" |

== Medal table ==
| Rank | Nation | Gold | Silver | Bronze | Total |
|---|---|---|---|---|---|
| 1 | Italy | 13 | 4 | 2 | 19 |
| 2 | Netherlands | 9 | 2 | 3 | 14 |
| 3 | Great Britain | 6 | 2 | 3 | 11 |
| 4 | Germany | 5 | 7 | 6 | 18 |
| 5 | France | 4 | 6 | 4 | 14 |
| 6 | Canada | 4 | 0 | 0 | 4 |
| 7 | Spain | 3 | 8 | 2 | 13 |
| 8 | Sweden | 2 | 0 | 0 | 2 |
| 9 | Colombia | 1 | 1 | 3 | 5 |
| 10 | South Africa | 1 | 1 | 0 | 2 |
| 11 | Belgium | 1 | 0 | 3 | 4 |
| 12 | Brazil | 1 | 0 | 1 | 2 |
| 13 | Slovakia | 1 | 0 | 0 | 1 |
| 14 | Russian Paralympic Committee | 0 | 6 | 4 | 10 |
| 15 | United States | 0 | 3 | 2 | 5 |
| 16 | Switzerland | 0 | 2 | 4 | 6 |
| 17 | Ireland | 0 | 2 | 2 | 4 |
| 18 | Austria | 0 | 2 | 1 | 3 |
| 19 | Ukraine | 0 | 1 | 0 | 1 |
| 20 | Poland | 0 | 0 | 3 | 3 |
| 21 | Czech Republic | 0 | 0 | 2 | 2 |
| Totals (21 entries) | | 51 | 47 | 45 | 143 |

== Participating nations ==
39 nations participated.

- Argentina (3)
- Austria (8)
- Belgium (15)
- Brazil (11)
- Canada (9)
- Colombia (10)
- Cuba (2)
- Czech Republic (8)
- Denmark (2)
- Dominican Republic (2)
- Estonia (3)
- Finland (4)
- France (13)
- Germany (16)
- Great Britain (12)
- Greece (4)
- Hungary (1)
- Indonesia (2)
- Ireland (7)
- Israel (1)
- Italy (20)
- Kenya (5)
- Latvia (1)
- Netherlands (17)
- Norway (1)
- Peru (2)
- Poland (12)
- Portugal (12)
- Romania (1)
- Russian Paralympic Committee (13)
- Slovakia (3)
- Slovenia (2)
- South Africa (4)
- Spain (18)
- Sweden (5)
- Switzerland (13)
- Ukraine (1)
- United States (6)
- Venezuela (1)
