= Cycling at the 2016 Summer Paralympics – Women's road time trial T1–2 =

Cycling, Women's road time trial T1-2 at the XV Paralympic Games
- Venue: Flamengo Park
- Dates: 14 September
- Competitors: 7 from 6 nations

Medalists
1st place, gold medalist(s)		Carol Cooke	Australia
2nd place, silver medalist(s)		Jill Walsh	United States
3rd place, bronze medalist(s)		Shelley Gautier	Canada

The Women's road time trial T1-2 road cycling event at the 2016 Summer Paralympics took place on the afternoon of 14 September at Flamengo Park, Pontal. 7 riders competed over one lap of a fifteen kilometre course.

The T1 category is for cyclists with significant balance issues. The T2 category is for cyclists with moderate balance issues. In both categories, tricycles are used.

== Results ==
Women's road time trial T1-2. 14 September 2016, Rio.

Rank	Rider	Nationality	Classification	Time	Factor (%)	Final Time
1st place, gold medalist(s)	Carol Cooke	Australia	T2	26:11.40	100	26:11.40
2nd place, silver medalist(s)	Jill Walsh	United States	T2	26:49.67	100	26:49.67
3rd place, bronze medalist(s)	Shelley Gautier	Canada	T1	32:36.13	82.35	26:50.87
4	Jana Majunke	Germany	T2	27:43.46	100	27:43.46
5	Hannah Dines	Great Britain	T2	28:51.20	100	28:51.20
6	Marie-Eve Croteau	Canada	T2	29:43.47	100	29:43.47
7	Cristina Liliana Otero	Argentina	T2	35:20.52	100	35:20.52
