= Cycling at the 2020 Summer Paralympics – Women's road time trial T1–2 =

Women's road time trial T1–2 at the XVI Paralympic Games
- Venue: Fuji Speedway
- Dates: 31 August 2021
- Competitors: 11 from 8 nations
- Winning time: 36:06.17

Medalists
1st place, gold medalist(s)		Jana Majunke	Germany
2nd place, silver medalist(s)		Carol Cooke	Australia
3rd place, bronze medalist(s)		Angelika Dreock-Käser	Germany

The women's road time trial T1–2 road cycling event at the 2020 Summer Paralympics took place on 31 August 2021 around the Fuji Speedway in Shizuoka Prefecture. 11 riders from 8 nations competed in the race.

The T1–2 classification is for cyclists who have an impairment which affects their balance. They compete with a three-wheeled cycle called a tricycle - three wheels providing more balance than a standard two-wheeled cycle.

== Results ==
The event started on 31 August 2021 at 15:37.

Rank	Rider	Nationality	Class	Real time	Factored time
1st place, gold medalist(s)	Jana Majunke	Germany	T2	36:06.17	36:06.17
2nd place, silver medalist(s)	Carol Cooke	Australia	T2	36:38.46	36:38.46
3rd place, bronze medalist(s)	Angelika Dreock-Käser	Germany	T2	36:53.88	36:53.88
4	Jill Walsh	United States	T2	37:24.20	37:24.20
5	Eltje Malzbender	New Zealand	T1	44:57.21	38:52.55
6	Marie-Ève Croteau	Canada	T2	39:45.55	39:45.55
7	Monica Sereda	United States	T2	40:48.12	40:48.12
8	Shelley Gautier	Canada	T1	47:33.05	41:07.32
9	Yulia Sibagatova	RPC	T1	56:56.11	49:14.25
10	Toni Mould	South Africa	T1	1:02:11.37	53:46.89
11	Aikaterini El Latif	Greece	T2	58:13.66	58:13.66

Factors

T1 – 86.480
T2 – 100.00
