= Rocky's Knife =

1967 film

- Directed by: Joachim Mock
- Written by: Joachim Mock
- Produced by: Joachim Mock
- Starring: Michael Miller; Karl-Josef Cramer; Thomas Rau
- Cinematography: Wolfgang Lührse
- Music by: Horst A. Hass
- Production company: Mock-Film
- Release date: 2 March 1967
- Running time: 88 minutes
- Country: West Germany
- Language: German

Rocky's Knife (German: Rockys Messer) is a 1967 West German thriller film directed by Joachim Mock and starring Michael Miller, Karl-Josef Cramer and Thomas Rau.

== Cast ==
- Michael Miller as Rocky
- Karl-Josef Cramer as The Long One
- Thomas Rau as Elois
- Christine Dass as Lu
- Barbara Ratthey as Knife-Kitti
- Heidrun Kussin as Eva
- Uwe Pietsch as Chicago
- Manfred Kunkel as Blacky
- Dietrich Stephan as Mauke
- Wolfgang Priewe as Klaus
- Mildred Wuest as Karin
- Arthur Binder
- Gerda Blisse
- Dieter Kursawe
- Ulrich del Mestre

== Bibliography ==
- Peter Cowie & Derek Elley. World Filmography: 1967. Fairleigh Dickinson University Press, 1977.
