= Cycling at the 2016 Summer Paralympics – Women's road race T1–2 =

Cycling, Women's road race T1-2 at the XV Paralympic Games
- Venue: Pontal, Rio
- Dates: September 17

The women's road race T1-2 cycling event at the 2016 Summer Paralympics took place on September 17 at Pontal, Rio. The race distance was 60 km.

== Results : Women's road race T1-2 ==
Rank	Name	Nationality	Classification	Time	Deficit
1st place, gold medalist(s)	Carol Cooke	Australia	T2	01:07:51	-
2nd place, silver medalist(s)	Jill Walsh	United States	T2	01:08:08	+17
3rd place, bronze medalist(s)	Jana Majunke	Germany	T2	01:08:19	+28
4	Marie-Eve Croteau	Canada	T2	01:08:42	51
5	Hannah Dines	Great Britain	T2	01:09:03	01:12:00
6	Shelley Gautier	Canada	T1	01:11:37	03:46:00
7	Cristina Otero	Argentina	T2	01:16:06	08:15:00
