= Jill Walsh =

Jill Walsh may refer to:

- Jill Walsh (cyclist) (born 1963), American cyclist
- Jill Paton Walsh (1937–2020), English novelist and children's writer
