= Björn Schnake =

German Paralympic table tennis player

Personal information
- Born: 13 December 1971 (age 54) Hildesheim, Germany

Sport
- Country: Germany
- Sport: Para table tennis
- Disability: Vitamin D resistant rickets
- Disability class: C7
Medal record
Para table tennis
Representing Germany
Paralympic Games
Bronze medal – third place	2020 Tokyo	Teams C6-7

Björn Schnake (born 13 December 1971) is a German Paralympic table tennis player. He won bronze in the Men's team class 6–7 at the 2020 Summer Paralympics in Tokyo with teammate Thomas Rau. For winning a bronze-medal at the Tokyo-Paralympics he was awarded by the President of the Federal Republic of Germany with Silver Laurel Leaf, Germany's highest sport-award.
