= Cycling at the 2020 Summer Paralympics – Women's road race H1–4 =

Women's road race H1–4 at the XVI Paralympic Games
- Venue: Fuji Speedway
- Dates: 1 September 2021
- Competitors: 16 from 15 nations
- Winning time: 56:15

Medalists
1st place, gold medalist(s)		Jennette Jansen	Netherlands
2nd place, silver medalist(s)		Annika Zeyen	Germany
3rd place, bronze medalist(s)		Alicia Dana	United States

The women's road race H1-4 cycling event at the 2020 Summer Paralympics took place on 1 September 2021, at the Fuji Speedway in Shizuoka Prefecture. 16 riders competed in the event.

The event covers the following four classifications, all of which uses hand-operated bicycles:

- H1: tetraplegics with severe upper limb impairment to the C6 vertebra.
- H2: tetraplegics with minor upper limb impairment from C7 through T3.
- H3: paraplegics with impairment from T4 through T10.
- H4: paraplegics with impairment from T11 down, and amputees unable to kneel.

== Results ==
The event took place on 1 September 2021 at 12:20.

Rank	Rider	Nationality	Class	Time	Deficit
1st place, gold medalist(s)	Jennette Jansen	Netherlands	H4	56:15	
2nd place, silver medalist(s)	Annika Zeyen	Germany	H3	56:21	+0:06
3rd place, bronze medalist(s)	Alicia Dana	United States	H3	56:24	+0:09
4	Svetlana Moshkovich	RPC	H4	57:47	+1:32
5	Renata Kałuża	Poland	H3	57:47	+1:32
6	Kateřina Antošová	Czech Republic	H3	59:37	+3:22
7	Francesca Porcellato	Italy	H3	59:45	+3:30
8	Anna Oroszová	Slovakia	H3	59:48	+3:33
9	Sandra Graf	Switzerland	H4	59:49	+3:34
10	Lee Do-yeon	South Korea	H4	1:00:34	+4:19
11	Sandra Stöckli	Switzerland	H4	1:03:53	+7:38
12	Suzanna Tangen	Norway	H4	1:06:38	+10:23
13	Jady Malavazzi	Brazil	H3	1:06:43	+10:28
14	Lee Gyeong-hwa	South Korea	H3	1:15:28	+19:13
15	Arna Sigríður Albertsdóttir	Iceland	H3	1:22:04	+25:49
	Elisabeth Egger	Austria	H3	DNF	
