= Cycling at the 2020 Summer Paralympics – Women's road race H5 =

Women's road race H5 at the XVI Paralympic Games
- Venue: Fuji Speedway
- Dates: 1 September
- Competitors: 6 from 5 nations
- Winning time: 2:23:39

Medalists
1st place, gold medalist(s)		Oksana Masters	United States
2nd place, silver medalist(s)		Sun Bianbian	China
3rd place, bronze medalist(s)		Katia Aere	Italy

The women's road race H5 cycling event at the 2020 Summer Paralympics took place on 1 September 2021, at the Fuji Speedway in Tokyo. Six riders competed in the event.

The H5 classification is for athletes who can kneel on a handcycle, a category that includes paraplegics and amputees. These riders operated using a hand-operated cycle.

== Results ==
The event took place on 1 September 2021, at 12:15:

Rank	Rider	Nationality	Time	Deficit
1st place, gold medalist(s)	Oksana Masters	United States	2:23:39	
2nd place, silver medalist(s)	Sun Bianbian	China	2:26:50	+3:11
3rd place, bronze medalist(s)	Katia Aere	Italy	2:28:11	+4:32
4	Chantal Haenen	Netherlands	2:47:25	+23:46
	Andrea Eskau	Germany	DNF	
	Ana Maria Vitelaru	Italy	DNF	
