= Florian Bouziani =

French para-cyclist (born 1990)

Personal information
- Nationality: French
- Born: 19 July 1990 (age 35) Avignon, France

Sport
- Sport: Para-cycling
- Disability class: C3
Medal record
Men's Para-cycling
Representing France
Road World Championships
Gold medal – first place	2021 Cascais	Time trial C3
Gold medal – first place	2024 Zurich	Time trial C3
Bronze medal – third place	2022 Baie-Comeau	Time trial C3

Florian Bouziani (born 19 July 1990) is a French Para-cyclist.

== Career ==
Bouziani represented France at the 2021 UCI Para-cycling Road World Championships and won a gold medal in the time trial C3 event. He failed to make France's roster for the 2020 Summer Paralympics, despite being the reigning World Champion in the C3 time trial category.

He again competed at the 2022 UCI Para-cycling Road World Championships and won a bronze medal in the time trial C3 event.

On 21 September 2024, he was selected to compete at the 2024 UCI Para-cycling Road World Championships. He won a gold medal in the time trial C3 event.

== Personal life ==
On 5 October 2013, Bouziani was involved in an explosion that destroyed the motorcycle shop where he was working at. He suffered burns to 90% of his body, was left paralyzed in his feet and had his right index finger amputated as a result of his injuries.
