= Carol Cooke =

Australian cyclist, swimmer, and rower

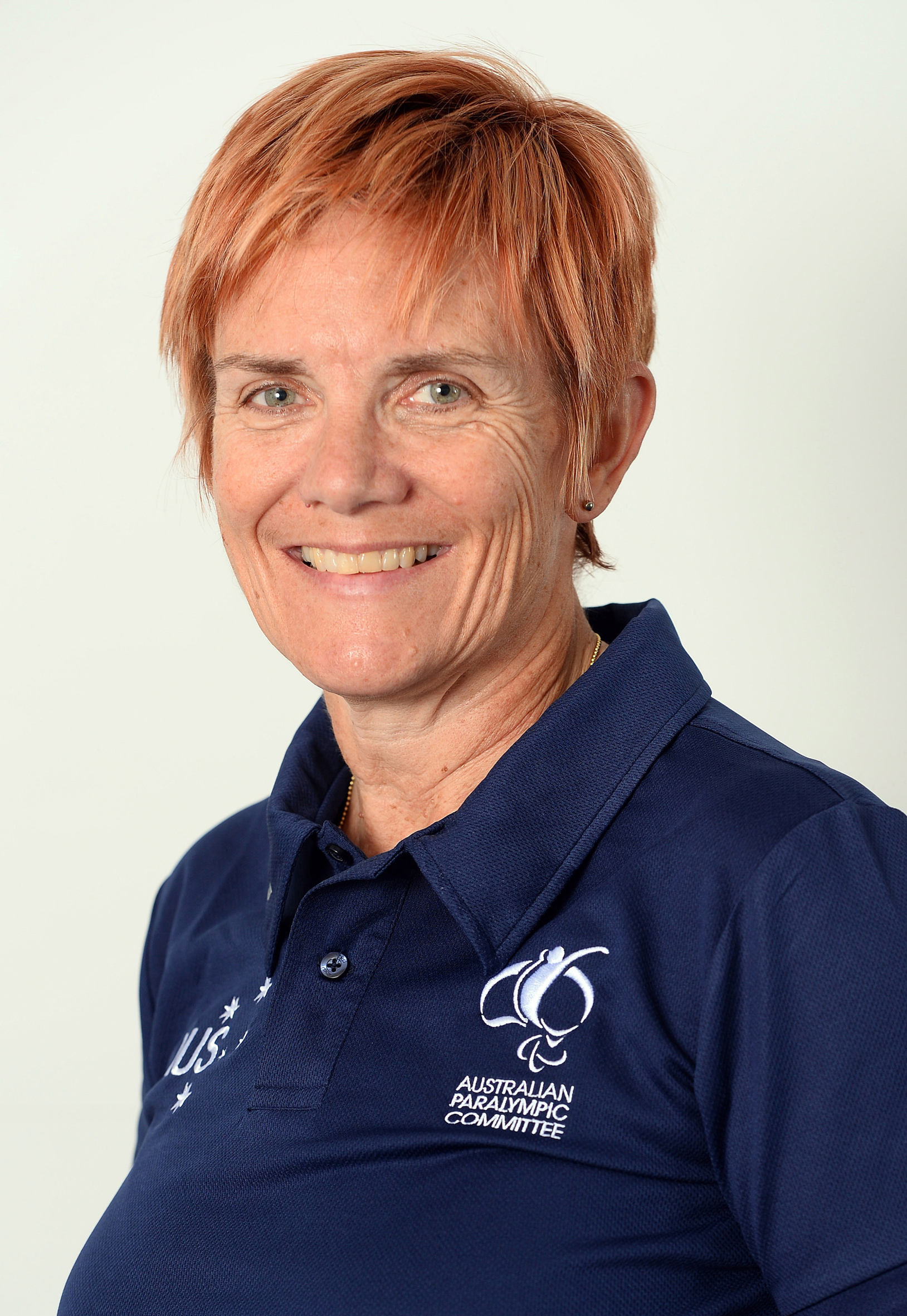
- 2016 Australian Paralympic team portrait of Cooke

Personal information
- Full name: Carol Lynn Cooke
- Nationality: Australian
- Born: 6 August 1961 (age 65) Toronto, Ontario, Canada

Sport
- Country: Australia
- Sport: Cycling
- Disability: Multiple sclerosis
- Disability class: T2
- Club: St. Kilda CC
Medal record
Cycling
Paralympic Games
Gold medal – first place	2012 London	Mixed Time Trial T1–2
Gold medal – first place	2016 Rio de Janeiro	Women's Time Trial T1–2
Gold medal – first place	2016 Rio de Janeiro	Women's Road Race T1–2
Silver medal – second place	2020 Tokyo	Women's Time Trial T1–2
UCI Para-cycling Road World Championships
Silver medal – second place	2011 Roskilde	Women's Individual Time Trial T2
Silver medal – second place	2011 Roskilde	Women's Road Race T2
Gold medal – first place	2013 Baie-Comeau	Women's Individual Time Trial T2
Gold medal – first place	2013 Baie-Comeau	Women's Road Race T2
Gold medal – first place	2014 Grenville	Women's Individual Time Trial T2
Gold medal – first place	2014 Grenville	Women's Road Race T2
Gold medal – first place	2015 Nottwil	Women's Individual Time Trial T2
Silver medal – second place	2015 Nottwil	Women's Road Race T2
Gold medal – first place	2017 Pietermaritzburg	Women's Individual Time Trial T2
Gold medal – first place	2017 Pietermaritzburg	Women's Road Race T2
Silver medal – second place	2018 Maniago	Women's Individual Time Trial T2
Silver medal – second place	2018 Maniago	Women's Road Race T2
Gold medal – first place	2019 Emmen	Women's Individual Time Trial T2
Gold medal – first place	2019 Emmen	Women's Road Race T2
Silver medal – second place	2022 Baie-Comeau	Women's Time Trial T2

Carol Lynn Cooke, AM (born 6 August 1961) is a Canadian-born Australian cyclist, swimmer and rower. A keen swimmer, she was part of the Canadian national swimming team and was hoping to be selected for the 1980 Moscow Olympics before her country boycotted the games. She moved to Australia in 1994, was diagnosed with multiple sclerosis in 1998, and took up rowing in 2006, in which she narrowly missed out on being part of the 2008 Beijing Paralympics. She then switched to cycling, where she won a gold medal at the 2012 London Paralympics, two gold medals at the 2016 Rio de Janeiro Paralympics and a silver medal at the 2020 Tokyo Paralympics.

== Personal ==
Carol Lynn Cooke was born on 6 August 1961 in Toronto, Ontario, Canada. She worked with the Metropolitan Toronto Police Force for 14 years, following in the footsteps of her family, and spent some time working with the undercover drug squad. She met and married her husband, then moved to Australia in 1994. Cooke was diagnosed with multiple sclerosis in 1998, just before her 37th birthday. She is an ambassador for those dealing with the disease. In this role, she founded the 24 Hour Mega Swim which is a relay swimming event that raises money for people with multiple sclerosis. By the time she stepped down 21 years on, Mega Swim and grown into Mega Challenges and raised over $11 million. She works as a motivational speaker and event planner and lives in the Melbourne suburb of Northcote.

== Sports career ==
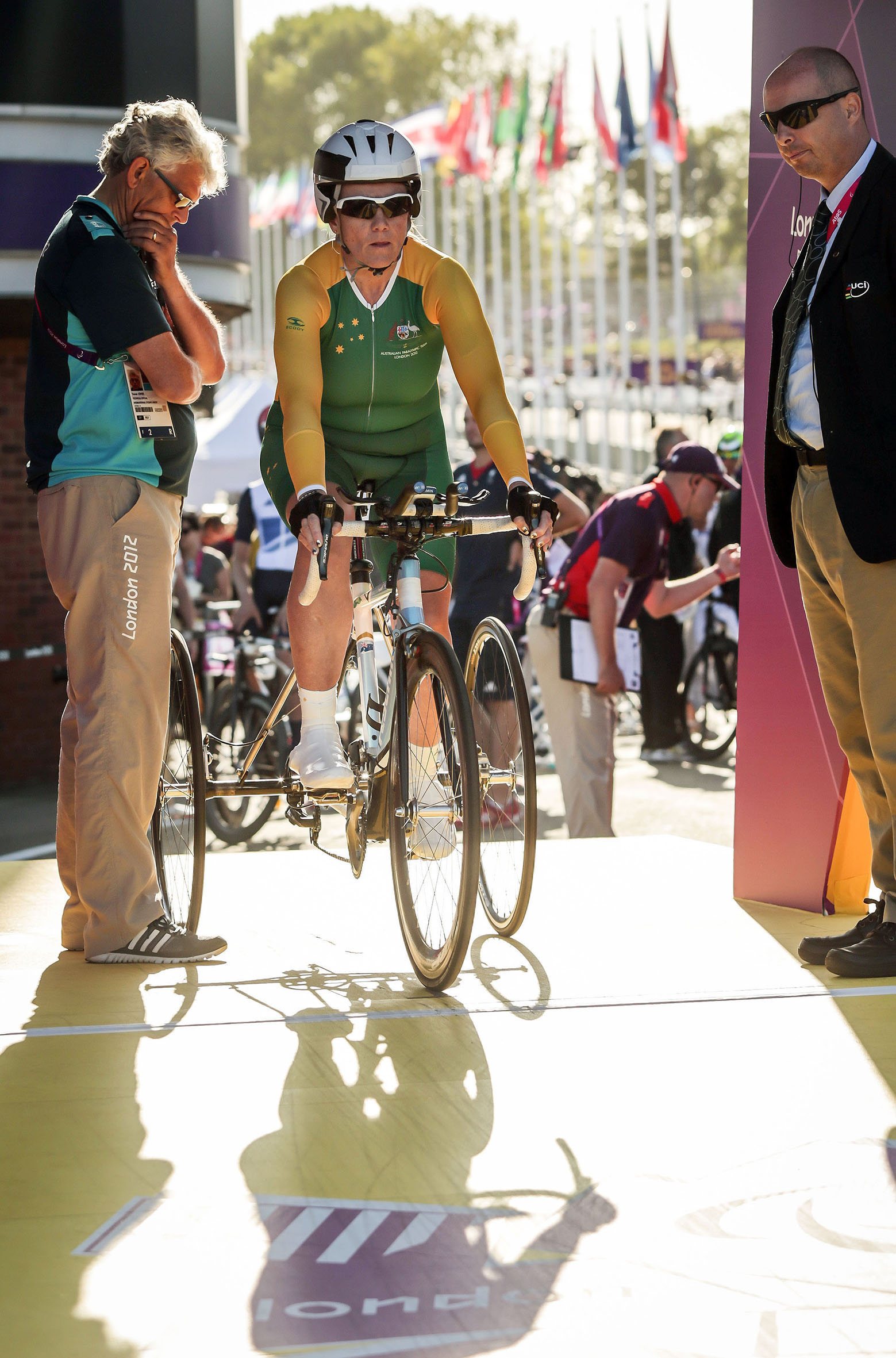
Cooke at the 2012 London Paralympics

Cooke is a keen swimmer, and was hoping to make the Canadian team for the 1980 Moscow Olympics, but she did not compete because Canada joined the boycott of the games. She then took up triathlon, coming fifth in her first competition, the 1985 World Police and Fire Games. She participated in several masters' tournaments in swimming, winning five medals (four gold and a silver) in the Athletes With Disability Division at the 2005 World Masters Games. In 2006, at the age of 44, she qualified for the Telstra Commonwealth Games Swimming Trials; she reached the finals of the 50m breaststroke multi-disability event.

She attended a talent search day run by the Victorian Institute of Sport in December 2005, where it was recommended that she take up rowing; she began training for the sport in June 2006. Her coxed four team missed out on a position at the 2008 Beijing Paralympics by 0.8 seconds in the qualifying World Cup tournament in Munich. She also came sixth at the 2009 World Rowing Championships.

She then took up cycling, buying a tricycle "on a whim", and won both the trial and road racing events at the 2011 Australian Para-Cycling Road Championships. She won gold medals in both the road race and road trial competitions at the 2011 Para-cycling Road World Cup in Australia, silver medals in the same events at that year's UCI Para-cycling Road World Championships in Denmark, and a gold medal at the 2012 London Paralympics in the Mixed Time Trial T1–2 event. Classified as a T2 cyclist, she is coached by Rebecca Henderson, receives a scholarship from the Victorian Institute of Sport, and is a member of St. Kilda CC.

Competing at the 2013 UCI Para-cycling Road World Championships in Baie-Comeau, Canada, she won two gold medals in the Women's Individual Time Trial T2 and Women's Road Race T2. Cooke successfully defended the titles at the 2014 UCI Para-cycling Road World Championships in Greenville, South Carolina.

In 2015, at the UCI Para-cycling Road World Championships in Nottwil, Switzerland, she won a gold medal in the Women's Time Trial T2 and a silver medal in the Women's Road Race T2.

At the 2016 Rio Paralympics, she won gold medals in the Women's Time Trial T1–2 and Women's Road Race T1–2.

Cooke won two gold medals in the Women's Time Trial T2 and Women's Road Race T2 at the 2017 UCI Para-cycling Road World Championships in Pietermaritzburg, South Africa.

At the 2018 UCI Para-cycling Road World Championships in Maniago, Italy, she won the silver medals in the Women's Time Trial T2 and Women's Road Race T2.

At the 2019 UCI Para-cycling Road World Championships, in Emmen, Netherlands, she won gold medals in the Women's Time Trial T2 and Women's Road Race T2.

At the 2020 Tokyo Paralympics, Cooke won the silver medal in the Women's Road Time Trial T1–2 with a time of 36:38.46, less than 32 seconds behind the winner, Jana Majunke of Germany. She did not finish the Women's Road Race T1–2 due to having a serious crash. She was hospitalised with a punctured lung and was unable to depart Tokyo with the main Australian team.

Cooke won the silver medal in the Women's Time Trial T2 and did not finish the Women's Road Race T2 at the 2022 UCI Para-cycling Road World Championships in Baie-Comeau.

== Recognition ==
Cooke was named the 2006 Victorian Masters' Athlete of the Year by the Victorian Institute of Sport. She was added to the lists of Who's Who of Australian Women and Victorians in 2008 and Who's Who of Australian Women in 2010. She received a Pride of Australia Medal in 2006 in the "role model" category, received the 2009 John Studdy Award from MS Australia, and was named a Paul Harris Fellow by Rotary International in 2009. In 2011, she received a commendation in the Minister for Health Volunteer Awards. In November 2013, she was named Cycling Australia's Elite Female Para-Cyclist of the Year. She was appointed a Member of the Order of Australia in the 2014 Australia Day Honours "For significant service to sport as a gold medallist at the London 2012 Paralympic Games, and through fundraising and representational roles with charitable healthcare organisations." She was awarded Cycling Australia's Female Elite Para-Cyclist in 2015, 2016 and 2017. In 2017, Cooke was awarded the Victorian Disability Sport and Recreation Masters Sportsperson of the Year and the Victorian Institute of Sport's top award – VIS Award of Excellence. In 2019 and 2022, Cooke was awarded Cycling Australia's Para Female Road Cyclist of the Year.

Cooke has written several books. Cycle of Life: A Gold Medal Paralympian's Secrets to Success was published in 2015, updated in 2017 as Finding Your Inner Gold, 2017, and The Force Within in July 2021.
