= Cycling at the 2020 Summer Paralympics – Women's road race T1–2 =

Women's road race T1–2 at the XVI Paralympic Games
- Venue: Fuji Speedway
- Dates: 2 September 2021
- Competitors: 11 from 8 nations
- Winning time: 1:00:58

Medalists
1st place, gold medalist(s)		Jana Majunke	Germany
2nd place, silver medalist(s)		Angelika Dreock-Käser	Germany
3rd place, bronze medalist(s)		Jill Walsh	United States

The women's road race T1-2 cycling event at the 2020 Summer Paralympics took place on 2 September 2021, at the Fuji Speedway in Shizuoka Prefecture. 11 riders competed in the event.

The T1–2 classification is for cyclists who have an impairment which affects their balance. They compete with a three-wheeled cycle called a tricycle - three wheels providing more balance than a standard two-wheeled cycle.

== Results ==
The event took place on 2 September 2021 at 13:05.

Rank	Rider	Nationality	Class	Time	Deficit
1st place, gold medalist(s)	Jana Majunke	Germany	T2	1:00:58	
2nd place, silver medalist(s)	Angelika Dreock-Käser	Germany	T2	1:03:40	+2:42
3rd place, bronze medalist(s)	Jill Walsh	United States	T2	1:05:48	+4:50
4	Monica Sereda	United States	T2	1:07:32	+6:34
5	Shelley Gautier	Canada	T1	1:24:48	+23:50
6	Aikaterini El Latif	Greece	T2	1:32:08	+31:10
7	Yulia Sibagatova	RPC	T1	1:40:22	+39:24
8	Toni Mould	South Africa	T1	1:52:17	+51:19
	Carol Cooke	Australia	T2	DNF	
	Marie-Ève Croteau	Canada	T2	DNF	
	Eltje Malzbender	New Zealand	T1	DNF	
