= Jill Walsh (cyclist) =

American para-cyclist (born 1963)

Personal information
- Born: June 19, 1963 (age 63) Rochester, New York, United States

Sport
- Country: United States
- Sport: Cycling
- Disability: Multiple sclerosis
- Disability class: T2
Medal record
Paralympic athletics
Representing United States
Paralympic Games
Silver medal – second place	2016 Rio de Janeiro	road time trial T1–2
Silver medal – second place	2016 Rio de Janeiro	road race T1–2
Bronze medal – third place	2020 Tokyo	road race T1–2
UCI Para-cycling Road World Championships
Gold medal – first place	2015 Nottwil	Women's Road Race T2
Gold medal – first place	2018 Maniago	Women's Individual Time Trial T2
Gold medal – first place	2018 Maniago	Women's Road Race T2
Silver medal – second place	2014 Grenville	Women's Road Race T2
Silver medal – second place	2015 Nottwil	Women's Individual Time Trial T2
Silver medal – second place	2017 Pietermaritzburg	Women's Individual Time Trial T2
Silver medal – second place	2019 Emmen	Women's Individual Time Trial T2
Silver medal – second place	2021 Cascais	Women's Individual Road Race T2
Bronze medal – third place	2014 Grenville	Women's Individual Time Trial T2
Bronze medal – third place	2017 Pietermaritzburg	Women's Road Race T2
Bronze medal – third place	2021 Cascais	Women's Individual Time Trial T2
Parapan American Games
Gold medal – first place	2015 Toronto	Mixed Road Time Trial T1-2
Gold medal – first place	2019 Lima	Mixed Road Time Trial T1-2

Jill Walsh (born June 19, 1963) is an American para-cyclist. She is a three-time medalist at the Paralympic Games and a two-time gold medalist at the Parapan American Games. She also won 11 medals, including three gold, at the UCI Para-cycling Road World Championships.

== Early life and background ==
Walsh was born in Rochester, New York on June 19, 1963. She attended Binghamton University and worked as a New York state trooper. In 2010, she was diagnosed with multiple sclerosis.

== Career ==
Walsh competed in the 2014 UCI Para-cycling Road World Championships in Greenville, South Carolina, where she won a bronze medal in Women's Individual Time Trial T2 and silver Women's Road Race T2, finishing behind Carol Cooke who had won both events. In 2015, at the UCI Para-cycling Road World Championships in Nottwil, Switzerland, she won a silver medal in the Women's Time Trial T2 and a gold medal in the Women's Road Race T2. A month later at the 2015 Parapan American Games, she won the gold medal in the Mixed Time Trial T1-2 event. At the 2016 Summer Paralympics, she won a silver medal in the women's time trial T1–2 category and the women's road race T1–2 category, finishing behind Cooke.

Walsh won a silver medal in the Women's Time Trial T2 and bronze medal in the Women's Road Race T2 at the 2017 UCI Para-cycling Road World Championships in Pietermaritzburg, South Africa. At the 2018 UCI Para-cycling Road World Championships in Maniago, Italy, she won the gold medals in the Women's Time Trial T2 and Women's Road Race T2. At the 2019 Parapan American Games, Walsh won the gold medal in the Mixed Time Trial T1-2 event. Then at the 2019 UCI Para-cycling Road World Championships, in Emmen, Netherlands, she won a silver medal in the Women's Time Trial T2.

Walsh competed in the 2021 UCI Para-cycling Road World Championships, where she won a bronze medal in the time trial and a silver medal in the road race. She then represented the United States at the delyed 2020 Summer Paralympics in the women's road time trial T1–2 and women's road race T1–2 events, the latter being her last and where she won a bronze medal.

== Personal life ==
Walsh is married to Greg Walsh and they have three children. Besides triathlon, she also enjoys building projects.
