= Sitting volleyball at the 2020 Summer Paralympics – Men's tournament =

Men's sitting volleyball at the XVI Paralympic Games
- Venue: Makuhari Messe
- Dates: 27 August – 4 September 2021
- Competitors: 96 from 8 nations

Medalists
1st place, gold medalist(s)		Iran
2nd place, silver medalist(s)		RPC (RPC)
3rd place, bronze medalist(s)		Bosnia and Herzegovina

The men's tournament in sitting volleyball at the 2020 Summer Paralympics was held between 27 August until 4 September 2021 at the Makuhari Messe, Tokyo.

== Results ==
All times are local (UTC+9).

=== Preliminary round ===
==== Pool A ====
Pos	Team	Pld	W	L	Pts	SW	SL	SR	SPW	SPL	SPR	Qualification
1	RPC (RPC)	3	3	0	3	9	0	MAX	225	151	1.490	Semifinals
2	Bosnia and Herzegovina	3	2	1	2	6	3	2.000	205	176	1.165	Semifinals
3	Egypt	3	1	2	1	3	6	0.500	193	174	1.109	Fifth place match
4	Japan	3	0	3	0	0	9	0.000	103	225	0.458	Seventh place match

Source: TOCOG

27 August 2021; 14:00 v	Japan	0–3	RPC (RPC)	Makuhari Messe, Tokyo; Referees: Khalid Shanishah (LBA), Christina Fiebich (USA)
27 August 2021; 14:00 v	(6–25, 17–25, 15–25); Results Statistics			Makuhari Messe, Tokyo; Referees: Khalid Shanishah (LBA), Christina Fiebich (USA)

27 August 2021; 22:00 v	Egypt	0–3	Bosnia and Herzegovina	Makuhari Messe, Tokyo; Referees: Andre Calado (BRA), Neal Konowalyk (CAN)
27 August 2021; 22:00 v	(23–25, 22–25, 15–25); Results Statistics			Makuhari Messe, Tokyo; Referees: Andre Calado (BRA), Neal Konowalyk (CAN)

29 August 2021; 10:00 v	RPC (RPC)	3–0	Bosnia and Herzegovina	Makuhari Messe, Tokyo; Referees: Neal Konowalyk (CAN), Ebrahim Firouzi (IRI)
29 August 2021; 10:00 v	(25–19, 25–18, 25–18); Results Statistics			Makuhari Messe, Tokyo; Referees: Neal Konowalyk (CAN), Ebrahim Firouzi (IRI)

29 August 2021; 18:30 v	Japan	0–3	Egypt	Makuhari Messe, Tokyo; Referees: Marie-Claude Richer (CAN), Huang Xiao (CHN)
29 August 2021; 18:30 v	(11–25, 7–25, 6–25); Results Statistics			Makuhari Messe, Tokyo; Referees: Marie-Claude Richer (CAN), Huang Xiao (CHN)

31 August 2021; 10:00 v	Egypt	0–3	RPC (RPC)	Makuhari Messe, Tokyo; Referees: Dominik Raca (CRO), Ute Fischer (GER)
31 August 2021; 10:00 v	(21–25, 17–25, 20–25); Results Statistics			Makuhari Messe, Tokyo; Referees: Dominik Raca (CRO), Ute Fischer (GER)

31 August 2021; 20:30 v	Bosnia and Herzegovina	3–0	Japan	Makuhari Messe, Tokyo; Referees: Barbara Pakuła (POL), Kim Jong-heun (KOR)
31 August 2021; 20:30 v	(25–13, 25–15, 25–13); Results Statistics			Makuhari Messe, Tokyo; Referees: Barbara Pakuła (POL), Kim Jong-heun (KOR)

==== Pool B ====
Pos	Team	Pld	W	L	Pts	SW	SL	SR	SPW	SPL	SPR	Qualification
1	Iran	3	3	0	3	9	0	MAX	225	177	1.271	Semifinals
2	Brazil	3	1	2	1	4	7	0.571	253	258	0.981	Semifinals
3	Germany	3	1	2	1	4	7	0.571	247	258	0.957	Fifth place match
4	China	3	1	2	1	4	7	0.571	241	273	0.883	Seventh place match

Source: TOCOG

28 August 2021; 10:00 v	Iran	3–0	Germany	Makuhari Messe, Tokyo; Referees: Vanessa Redes (BRA), Khalid Shanishah (LBA)
28 August 2021; 10:00 v	(25–23, 25–16, 25–17); Results Statistics			Makuhari Messe, Tokyo; Referees: Vanessa Redes (BRA), Khalid Shanishah (LBA)

28 August 2021; 18:30 v	Brazil	3–1	China	Makuhari Messe, Tokyo; Referees: Sari Mannersuo (FIN), Ritsuto Yamamichi (JPN)
28 August 2021; 18:30 v	(28–26, 26–28, 25–19, 25–13); Results Statistics			Makuhari Messe, Tokyo; Referees: Sari Mannersuo (FIN), Ritsuto Yamamichi (JPN)

30 August 2021; 14:00 v	Germany	1–3	China	Makuhari Messe, Tokyo; Referees: Kim Jong-heun (KOR), Sari Mannersuo (FIN)
30 August 2021; 14:00 v	(23–25, 25–23, 23–25, 23–25); Results Statistics			Makuhari Messe, Tokyo; Referees: Kim Jong-heun (KOR), Sari Mannersuo (FIN)

30 August 2021; 20:30 v	Iran	3–0	Brazil	Makuhari Messe, Tokyo; Referees: Ritsuto Yamamichi (JPN), Krisztina Árpás (HUN)
30 August 2021; 20:30 v	(25–19, 25–23, 25–22); Results Statistics			Makuhari Messe, Tokyo; Referees: Ritsuto Yamamichi (JPN), Krisztina Árpás (HUN)

31 August 2021; 14:00 v	Brazil	1–3	Germany	Makuhari Messe, Tokyo; Referees: Ebrahim Firouzi (IRI), Haris Helac (BIH)
31 August 2021; 14:00 v	(23–25, 25–22, 19–25, 18–25); Results Statistics			Makuhari Messe, Tokyo; Referees: Ebrahim Firouzi (IRI), Haris Helac (BIH)

31 August 2021; 18:30 v	China	0–3	Iran	Makuhari Messe, Tokyo; Referees: Christina Fiebich (USA), Toomas Murulo (EST)
31 August 2021; 18:30 v	(21–25, 22–25, 14–25); Results Statistics			Makuhari Messe, Tokyo; Referees: Christina Fiebich (USA), Toomas Murulo (EST)

=== Knockout stage ===
==== Bracket ====
Semifinals
2 September
RPC (RPC)	3
Brazil	1
2 September
Iran	3
Bosnia and Herzegovina	0

Gold medal match
4 September
RPC (RPC) (silver)	1
Iran (gold)	3
Bronze medal match
4 September
Brazil	1
Bosnia and Herzegovina (bronze)	3

==== Semifinals ====
2 September 2021; 18:30 v	RPC (RPC)	3–1	Brazil	Makuhari Messe, Tokyo; Referees: Haris Helać (BIH), Christina Fiebich (USA)
2 September 2021; 18:30 v	(22–25, 25–21, 25–19, 25–19); Results Statistics			Makuhari Messe, Tokyo; Referees: Haris Helać (BIH), Christina Fiebich (USA)

2 September 2021; 20:30 v	Iran	3–0	Bosnia and Herzegovina	Makuhari Messe, Tokyo; Referees: Dominik Raca (CRO), Andre Calado (BRA)
2 September 2021; 20:30 v	(25–16, 25–16, 25–17); Results Statistics			Makuhari Messe, Tokyo; Referees: Dominik Raca (CRO), Andre Calado (BRA)

==== Seventh place match ====
2 September 2021; 13:30 v	Japan	0–3	China	Makuhari Messe, Tokyo; Referees: Ute Fischer (GER), Vanessa Redes (BRA)
2 September 2021; 13:30 v	(14–25, 18–25, 19–25); Results Statistics			Makuhari Messe, Tokyo; Referees: Ute Fischer (GER), Vanessa Redes (BRA)

==== Fifth place match ====
2 September 2021; 15:30 v	Egypt	3–2	Germany	Makuhari Messe, Tokyo; Referees: Kim Jong-heun (KOR), Marie-Claude Richer (CAN)
2 September 2021; 15:30 v	(25–23, 24–26, 25–18, 22–25, 15–8); Results Statistics			Makuhari Messe, Tokyo; Referees: Kim Jong-heun (KOR), Marie-Claude Richer (CAN)

==== Bronze medal match ====
4 September 2021; 14:00 v	Brazil	1–3	Bosnia and Herzegovina (bronze)	Makuhari Messe, Tokyo; Referees: Neal Konowalyk (CAN), Sari Mannersuo (FIN)
4 September 2021; 14:00 v	(25–23, 19–25, 18–25, 11–25); Results Statistics			Makuhari Messe, Tokyo; Referees: Neal Konowalyk (CAN), Sari Mannersuo (FIN)

==== Gold medal match ====
4 September 2021; 19:00 v	(silver) RPC (RPC)	1–3	Iran (gold)	Makuhari Messe, Tokyo; Referees: Toomas Murulo (EST), Benno Meijer (NED)
4 September 2021; 19:00 v	(21–25, 14–25, 25–19, 17–25); Results Statistics			Makuhari Messe, Tokyo; Referees: Toomas Murulo (EST), Benno Meijer (NED)

== Final ranking ==
Rank	Team
1st place, gold medalist(s)	Iran
2nd place, silver medalist(s)	RPC (RPC)
3rd place, bronze medalist(s)	Bosnia and Herzegovina
4	Brazil
5	Egypt
6	Germany
7	China
8	Japan

== See also ==
- Sitting volleyball at the 2020 Summer Paralympics – Women's tournament
