= Sun Bianbian =

Chinese para-cyclist

Personal information
- Nationality: Chinese
- Born: 27 July 1988 (age 37)

Sport
- Sport: Para-cycling
- Disability class: H5
Medal record
Women's Para-cycling
Representing China
Paralympic Games
Silver medal – second place	2020 Tokyo	Road time trial H4–5
Silver medal – second place	2020 Tokyo	Road race H5
Silver medal – second place	2024 Paris	Road race H5
Bronze medal – third place	2024 Paris	Road time trial H4–5
Asian Para Games
Gold medal – first place	2022 Hangzhou	Road race H1–5
Silver medal – second place	2022 Hangzhou	Time trial H1–5

Sun Bianbian (born 27 July 1988) is a Chinese Para-cyclist. She represented China in the 2020 Summer Paralympics.

== Career ==
Sun represented China in the 2020 Summer Paralympics where she won the silver medal in the road time trial H4–5 and road race H5 events.
