= Hannah Dines =

British T2 trike rider

Personal information
- Born: 14 April 1993 (age 33) Glasgow, Scotland
- Education: Dundee University; Manchester Metropolitan University

Sport
- Country: Great Britain
- Sport: Paralympic cycling
- Disability: Cerebral palsy
- Disability class: T2
- Coached by: Paula Dunn; Janice Eaglesham

Hannah Dines (born 14 April 1993) is a British former T2 trike rider who competed at the 2016 Summer Paralympics.

She competed in the 2015 UCI C1 Brixia Para-cycling Cup in Italy where she won a TT and road race in the T2 class.
