= Ana Maria Vitelaru =

Italian Paralympic cyclist

Personal information
- Born: 30 March 1983 (age 43) Romania

Sport
- Country: Italy
Medal record
Women's cycling
Representing Italy
Paralympic Games
Bronze medal – third place	2024 Paris	Road race H5
Road World Championships
Silver medal – second place	2021 Cascais	Road race H5
Silver medal – second place	2021 Cascais	Time trial H5
Silver medal – second place	2022 Baie-Comeau	Road race H5
Silver medal – second place	2022 Baie-Comeau	Time trial H5
Silver medal – second place	2024 Zurich	Road race H5
Silver medal – second place	2025 Ronse	Road race H5
Bronze medal – third place	2018 Maniago	Road race H5
Bronze medal – third place	2018 Maniago	Time trial H5
Bronze medal – third place	2023 Glasgow	Time trial H5
Bronze medal – third place	2024 Zurich	Time trial H5
Bronze medal – third place	2025 Ronse	Time trial H5

Ana Maria Vitelaru (born 30 March 1983) is an Italian cyclist who competes in handcycle events. Vitelaru represented Italy at the 2020 and 2024 Summer Paralympics, winning a bronze medal in the latter.

== Early life ==
Vitelaru was born in Romania on 30 March 1983. In 2000, when she was 17, she emigrated to Italy, and in the same year, she was involved in an accident at a train station that caused her to have both of her legs amputated.

== Cycling career ==
At the 2018 Road World Championships, Vitelaru won the bronze medal in the road race and time trial. She also competed in these two events in the 2021 UCI Para-cycling Road World Championships, where she won the silver medal in both of these events behind Chantal Haenen. At the 2022 UCI Para-cycling Road World Championships, Vitelaru won the silver medal in the road race and time trial events. At the 2023 UCI Para-cycling Road World Championships, she won the bronze medal in the time trial. In the 2024 Summer Paralympics, Vitelaru won the bronze medal in the road race.
