= Chantal Haenen =

Dutch para-cyclist and pararower (born 1997)

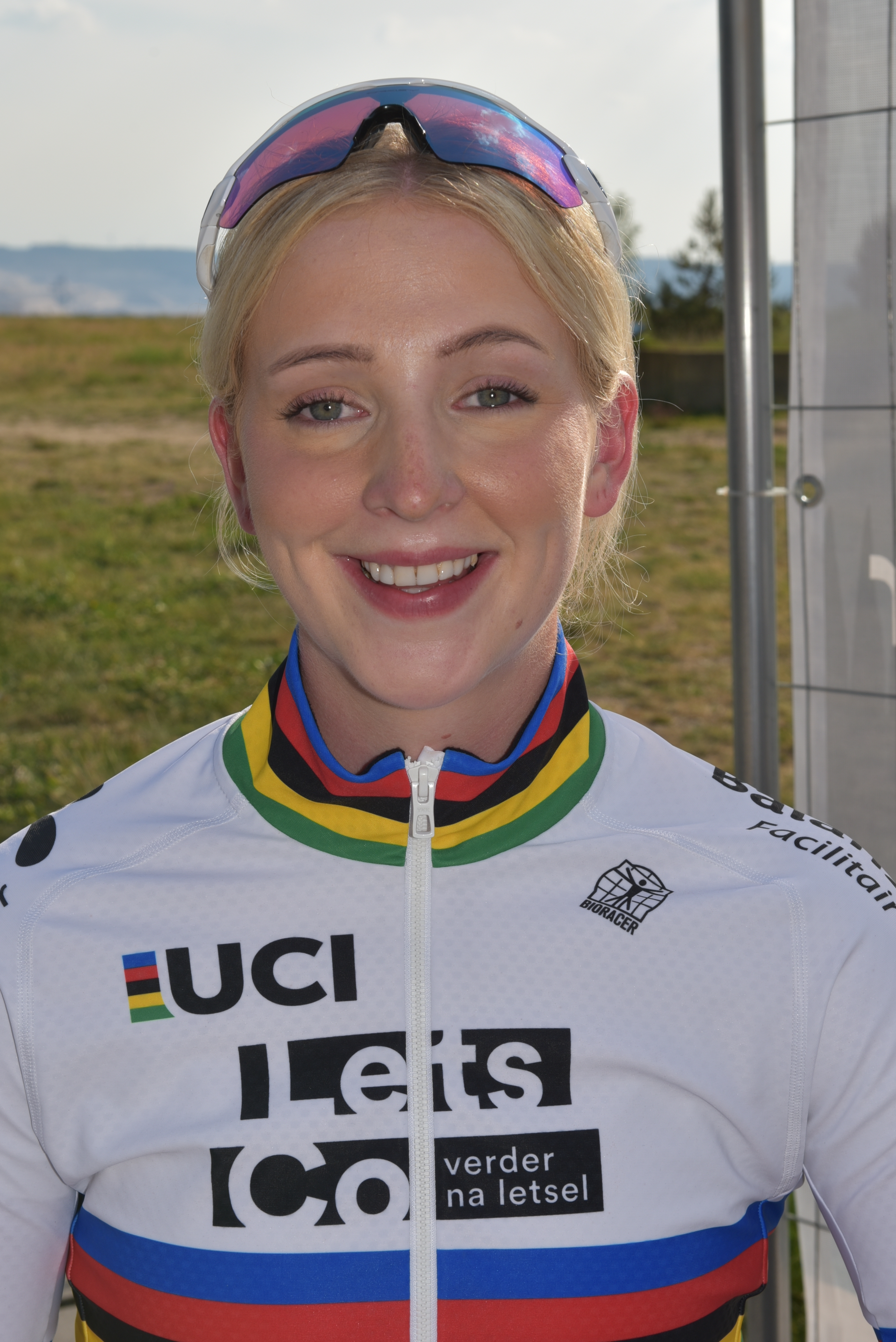
- Chantal Haenen (2022)

Personal information
- Nationality: Dutch
- Born: 22 April 1997 (age 29)
- Weight: 46 kg (101 lb)

Sport
- Sport: Para-cycling; pararowing
- Disability class: H5
- Coached by: Jelle Vanendert
Medal record
Women's Para-cycling
Representing Netherlands
Paralympic Games
| Silver medal – second place | 2024 Paris | Road time trial H4–5 |
Road World Championships
| Gold medal – first place | 2021 Cascais | Time trial H5 |
| Gold medal – first place | 2021 Cascais | Road race H5 |
| Gold medal – first place | 2023 Glasgow | Time trial H5 |
| Gold medal – first place | 2024 Zurich | Time trial H5 |
| Gold medal – first place | 2024 Zurich | Road race H5 |
| Gold medal – first place | 2025 Ronse | Time trial H5 |
| Gold medal – first place | 2025 Ronse | Road race H5 |
| Silver medal – second place | 2023 Glasgow | Road race H5 |
| Bronze medal – third place | 2019 Emmen | Time trial H5 |
| Bronze medal – third place | 2019 Emmen | Time trial H5 |
| Bronze medal – third place | 2022 Baie-Comeau | Road race H5 |
Pararowing
European Rowing Championships
| Silver medal – second place | 2023 Bled | PR2 mixed double sculls |

Chantal Haenen (born 22 April 1997) is a Dutch para-cyclist who competes in the H5 category and pararower. She is a seven-time gold medalist at the Road World Championships.

== Sporting career ==
Prior to her impairment and para-cycling career, Haenen had competed in showjumping. When she was 18 years old, she was involved in a traffic accident that resulted in having her legs amputated.

Haenen began her para-cycling career in 2017. She competed in the 2019 UCI Para-cycling Road World Championships, winning the bronze medal in the time trial and road race events, and also competed in these two events in the 2021 UCI Para-cycling Road World Championships, where she won the gold medal in both of them. She then competed at the delayed 2020 Summer Paralympics in the time trial and road race, finishing in fourth place in both of them. In the 2022 UCI Para-cycling Road World Championships, Haenen won the bronze medal in the road race event. The following year, she won the gold medal in the time trial and the silver medal in the road race.

In addition to para-cycling, Haenen also competes in pararowing, having competed alongside Corné de Koning in the PR2 mixed double sculls events in the 2022 and 2023 World Rowing Championships, where the two finished in fourth place in both of them.
