= Monica Sereda =

American paracyclist (born 1967)

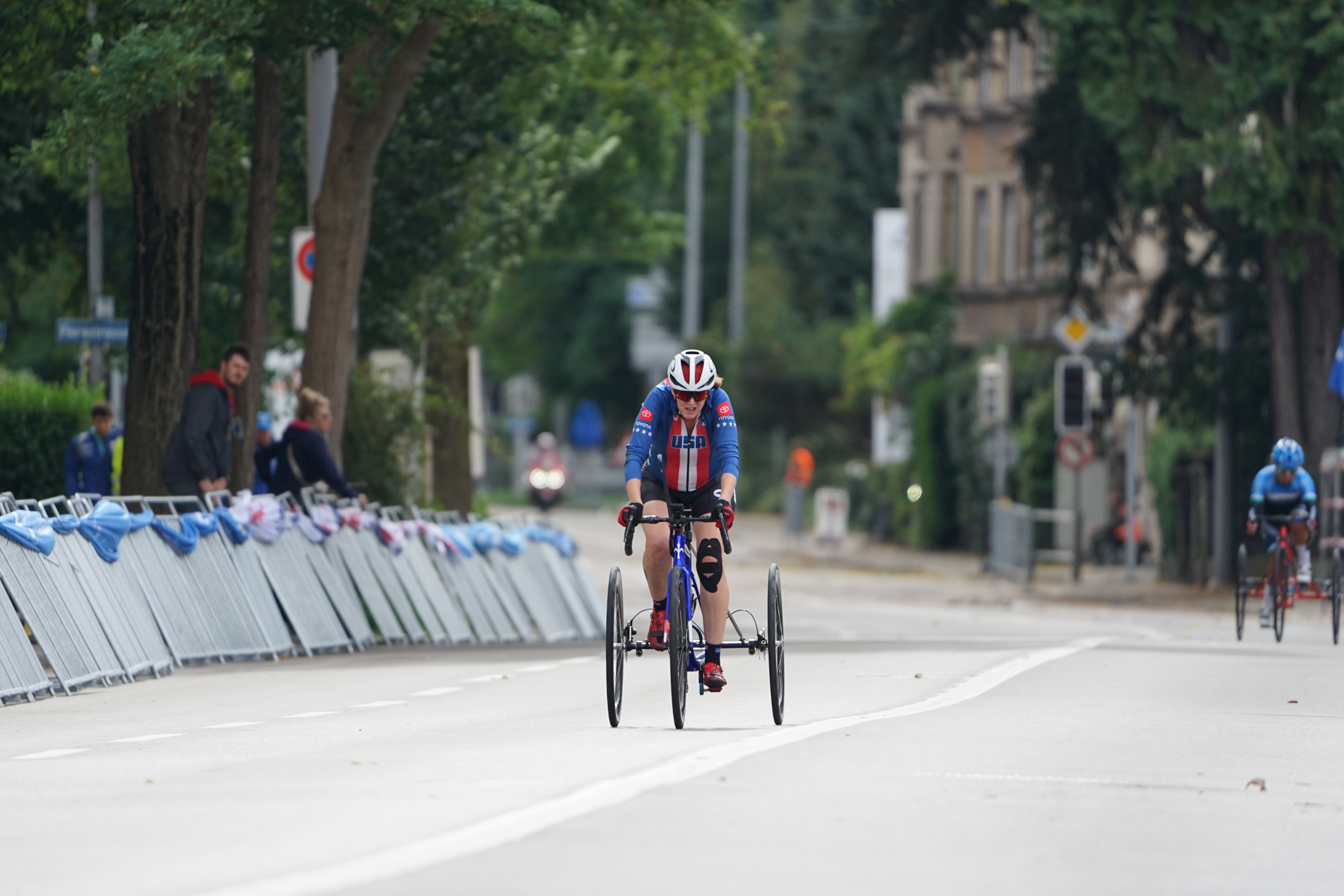
- Monica Sereda during the 2024 World Championships

Personal information
- Nationality: American
- Born: July 13, 1967 (age 58) Chicago, Illinois, United States

Sport
- Country: United States
- Sport: Cycling
- Disability class: T2

Monica Sereda (born July 13, 1967) is an American Paralympic cyclist. She competed at the 2020 Summer Paralympics, which were postponed to 2021.

== Personal life ==
Sereda was born in Chicago, Illinois on July 13, 1967, and graduated from Lyons Township High School in La Grange, Illinois. She retired as a master sergeant in the United States Army in 2011.

Sereda is part of the LGBTQ community.
