= Angelika Dreock-Käser =

Germany para-cyclist (born 1967)

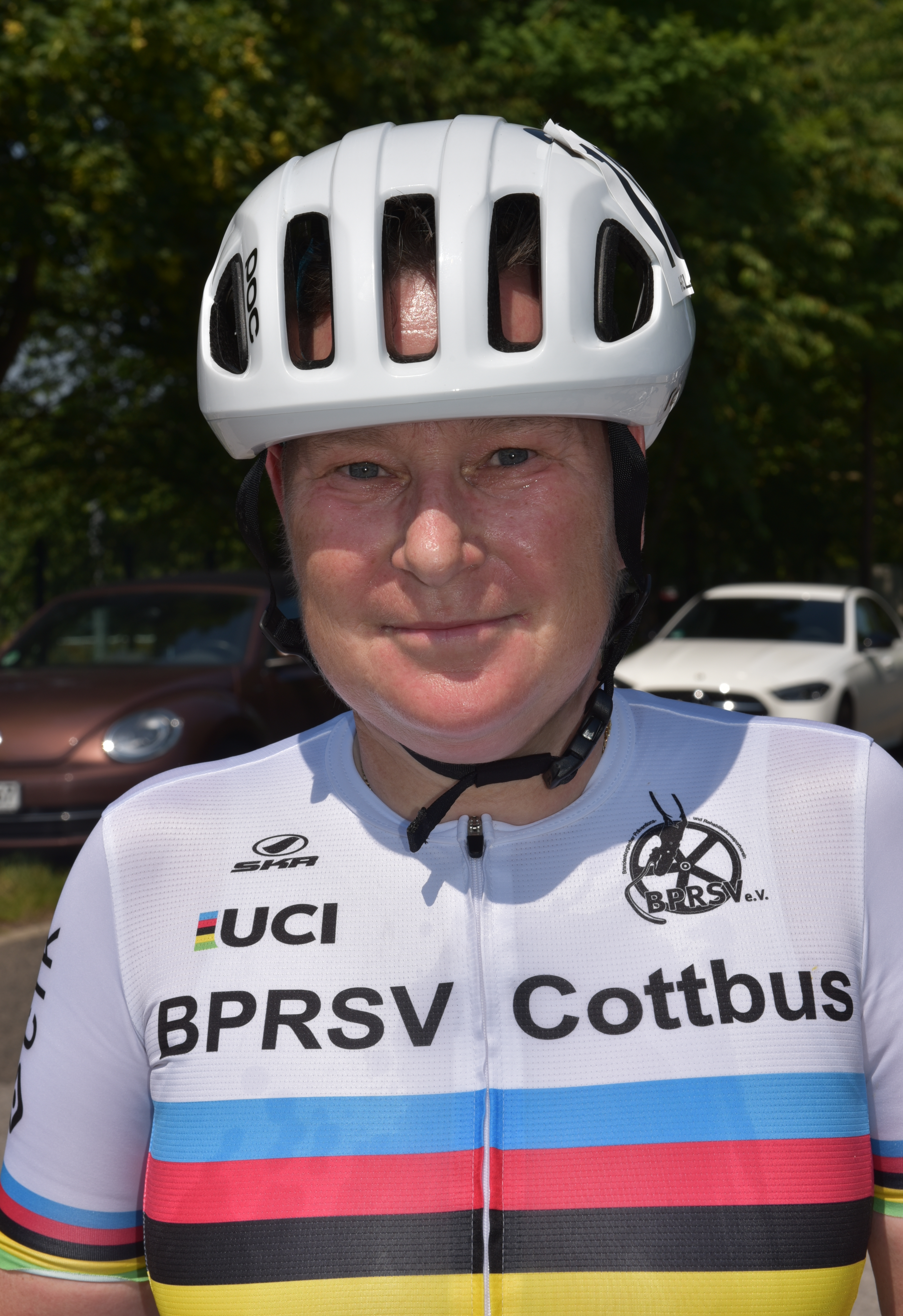
- Dreock-Käser in 2022

Personal information
- Nationality: German
- Born: 2 March 1967 (age 59) Bremervörde, Germany

Sport
- Sport: Para-cycling
- Disability: Ataxia
- Disability class: T2
- Club: BPRSV Cottbus
- Coached by: Renee Schmidt
Medal record
Women's Para-cycling
Representing Germany
Paralympic Games
Silver medal – second place	2020 Tokyo	Road race T1–2
Bronze medal – third place	2020 Tokyo	Road time trial T1–2
Road World Championships
Gold medal – first place	2021 Cascais	Time trial T2
Gold medal – first place	2022 Baie-Comeau	Time trial T2
Silver medal – second place	2023 Glasgow	Time trial T2
Silver medal – second place	2025 Ronse	Time trial T2
Bronze medal – third place	2021 Cascais	Road race T2
Bronze medal – third place	2024 Zurich	Time trial T2
Bronze medal – third place	2024 Zurich	Road race T2
Bronze medal – third place	2025 Ronse	Road race T2
European Championships
Silver medal – second place	2023 Rotterdam	Time trial T2
Silver medal – second place	2023 Rotterdam	Road race T2

Angelika Dreock-Käser (born 2 March 1967) is a German para-cyclist who represented Germany at the 2020 Summer Paralympics.

== Career ==
Dreock-Käser represented Germany at the 2020 Summer Paralympics in the women's road race T1–2 event and won a silver medal. She also competed in the women's road time trial T1–2 event and won a bronze medal.
