= Thomas Rau =

German para table tennis player

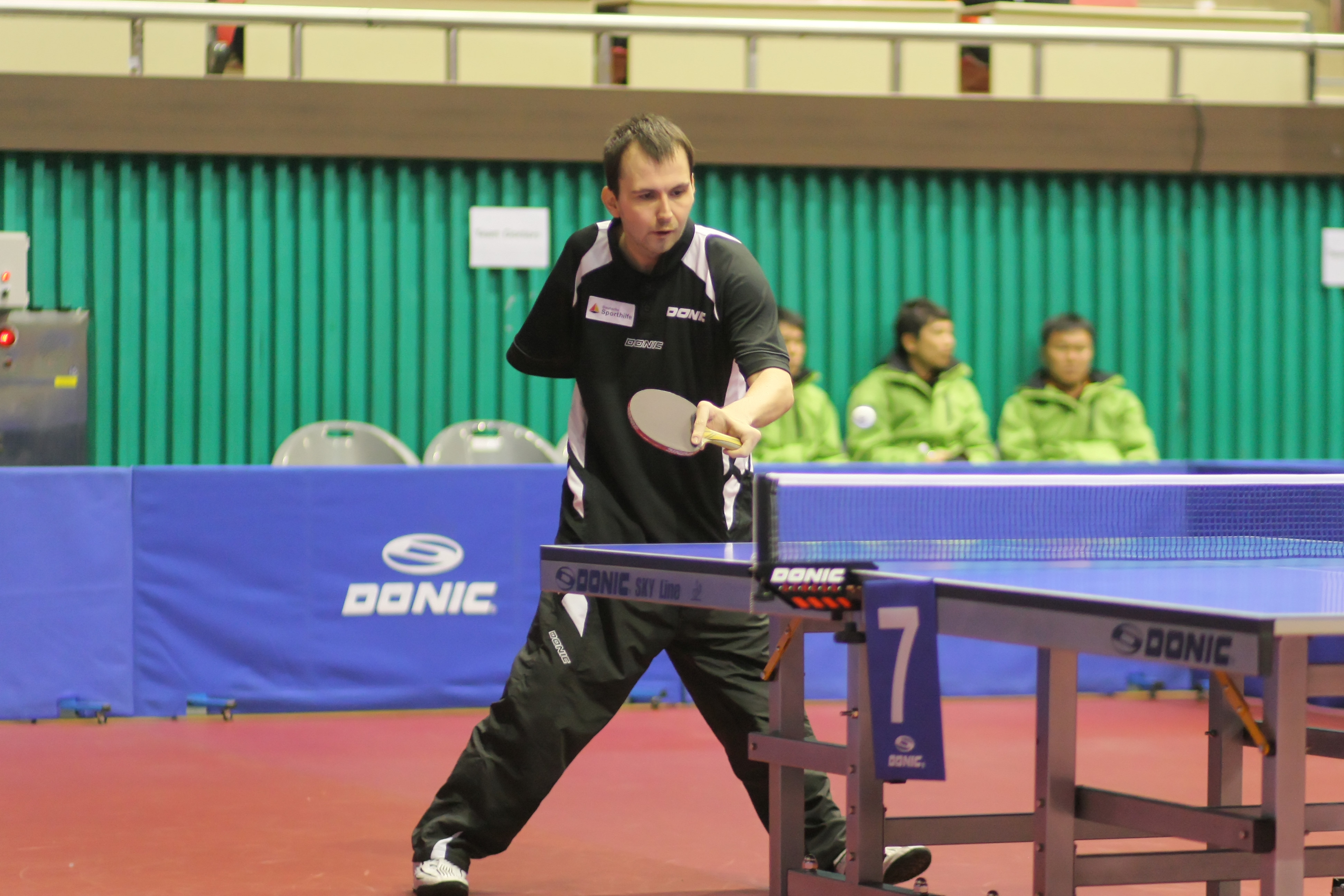
- Rau at 2010 World Championships

Personal information
- Nickname: Dirk
- Born: 6 April 1984 (age 42) Neustadt in Holstein, West Germany
- Height: 1.78 m (5 ft 10 in)

Sport
- Country: Germany
- Sport: Para table tennis
- Disability: Ectrodactyly
- Disability class: C6
Medal record
Para table tennis
Representing Germany
Paralympic Games
| Bronze medal – third place | 2020 Tokyo | Teams C6-7 |
World Championships
| Bronze medal – third place | 2010 Gwangju | Singles C6 |
European Championships
| Gold medal – first place | 2011 Split | Teams C6 |
| Silver medal – second place | 2011 Split | Singles C6 |
| Silver medal – second place | 2013 Lignano | Teams C6 |
| Bronze medal – third place | 2019 Helsingborg | Singles C6 |

Thomas Rau (born 6 April 1984) is a German para table tennis player. He won bronze in the Men's team class 6–7 at the 2020 Summer Paralympics in Tokyo. He is a European champion and a World bronze medalist. He was born without a right arm and has missing fingers on his left hand.
