= Jennette Jansen =

Dutch Paralympic athlete (born 1968)

Personal information
- Nationality: Dutch
- Born: 17 April 1968 (age 58) Westerhaar, Netherlands

Sport
- Sport: Para-cycling
Medal record
Representing Netherlands
Women's paralympic athletics
Paralympic Games
Gold medal – first place	1988 Seoul	800 m A1–3/A9/L2
Gold medal – first place	1988 Seoul	1500 m A1–3/A9/L2
Gold medal – first place	1988 Seoul	3000 m A1–3/A9/L2
Silver medal – second place	1992 Barcelona	5000 metres – TW3-4
Silver medal – second place	1992 Barcelona	Marathon – TW3-4
Bronze medal – third place	1992 Barcelona	1500 metres – TW3-4
Women's wheelchair basketball
Paralympic Games
Silver medal – second place	1996 Atlanta	Team competition
Women's para cycling
Paralympic Games
Gold medal – first place	2020 Tokyo	Road race H1–4
Silver medal – second place	2024 Paris	Road race H1–4
Bronze medal – third place	2016 Rio de Janeiro	Road race H5
Bronze medal – third place	2020 Tokyo	Road time trial H4–5
Road World Championships
Gold medal – first place	2023 Glasgow	Time trial H4
Gold medal – first place	2023 Glasgow	Road race H4
Gold medal – first place	2024 Zurich	Road race H4
European Championships
Gold medal – first place	2023 Rotterdam	Time trial H4
Bronze medal – third place	2023 Rotterdam	Road race H4

Jennette Jansen (born 17 April 1968) is a Paralympian from the Netherlands competing mainly in category TW4 wheelchair racing and later as a basketball player and cyclist. She competed at the 2020 Summer Paralympics, in Women's individual class 7, winning a gold medal, and in Women's road time trial H4–5 winning a bronze medal.

== Career ==
Jansen first appeared in the Paralympics in the Athletics events of the 1988 Seoul games, where she won three gold medals in athletics. By the time of the Atlanta games in 1996 she was part of the Dutch team in wheelchair basketball that won the silver medal, she continued competing as part of the team in 2000 and 2004 but without any further medal success. She competed at the 2016 Summer Paralympics, where she won bronze in the H5 road race.
