= Svetlana Moshkovich =

Russian-Austrian cyclist (born 1983)

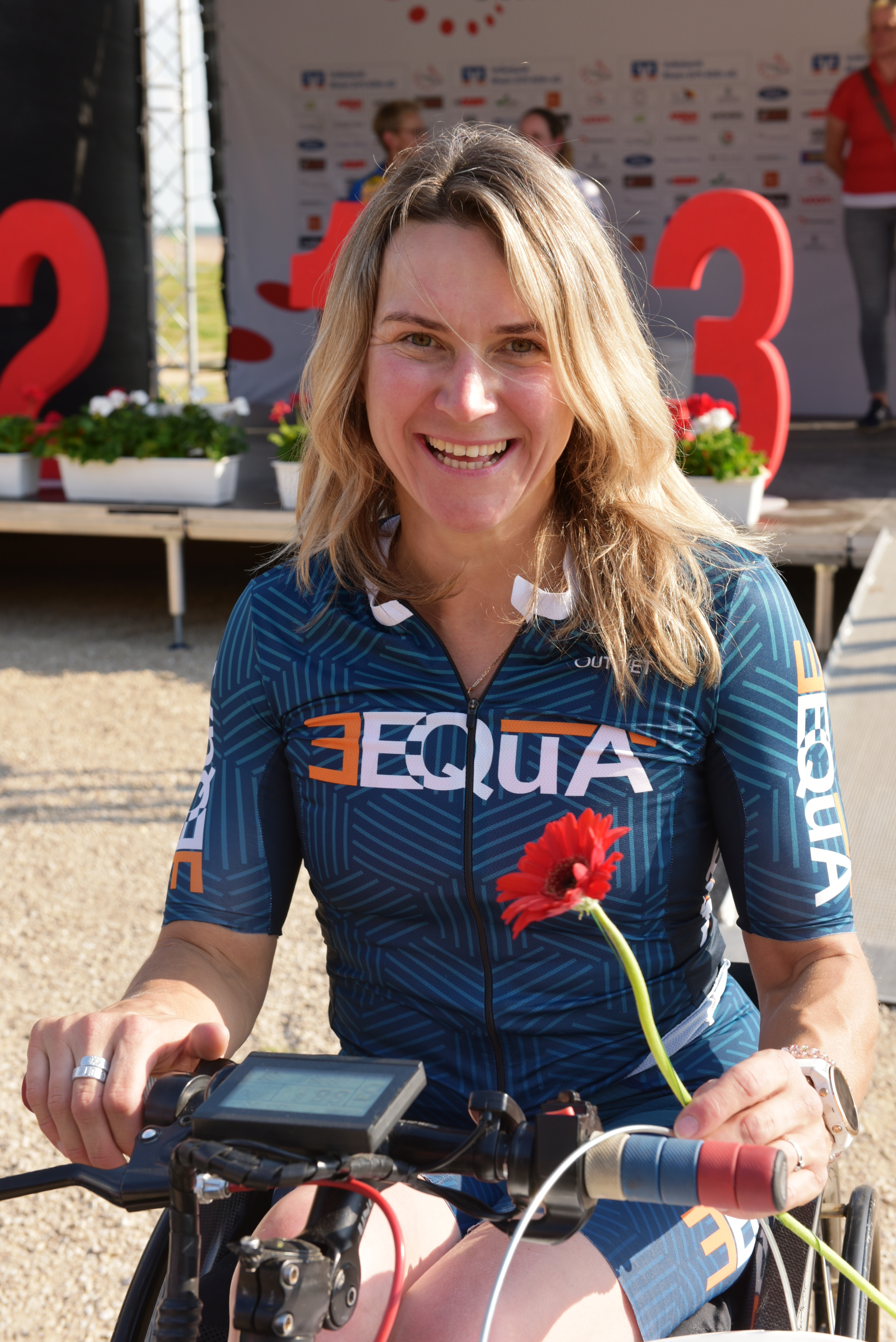
- Moshkovich in 2022

Personal information
- Born: 4 June 1983 (age 43) Krasnoyarsk, Russian SFSR, Soviet Union

Cycling career
- Sport: Cycling
- Discipline: Road
- Role: Rider
Medal record
Representing Russia
Paralympic Games
Bronze medal – third place	2012 London	Time trial H3
Road World Championships
Gold medal – first place	2015 Nottwil	Time trial H4
Silver medal – second place	2013 Baie-Comeau	Road race H3
Silver medal – second place	2013 Baie-Comeau	Time trial H3
Silver medal – second place	2014 Greenville	Road race H4
Silver medal – second place	2014 Greenville	Time trial H4
Silver medal – second place	2017 Pietermaritzburg	Road race H4
Silver medal – second place	2018 Maniago	Road race H4
Silver medal – second place	2018 Maniago	Time trial H4
Bronze medal – third place	2017 Pietermaritzburg	Time trial H4
Representing Austria
Gold medal – first place	2024 Zurich	Time trial H4
Gold medal – first place	2025 Ronse	Time trial H4
Bronze medal – third place	2025 Ronse	Road race H4
Representing the RPC
Silver medal – second place	2021 Cascais	Time trial H4

Svetlana Vladimirovna Moshkovich (Note: Russian: Светлана Владимировна Мошкович) (born 4 June 1983) is a Russian-Austrian paracyclist who competes in handbike races.

== Early and personal life ==
In 2004, Moshkovich suffered severe spinal injuries in a car accident. Her boyfriend and another friend died in the accident, and she has had to use a wheelchair since then. Before the accident, she had been involved in dance sport. She came to Heidelberg from Russia as part of a rehabilitation program. Since life for a physically disabled person was more independent in Germany than in Russia, she decided to stay in 2009. She continued her studies in computer linguistics and began to exercise with a handbike, which gave her a feeling of freedom. She then began studying sports in Innsbruck, where she has lived since 2014. In 2022, Moshkovich became an Austrian citizen.

== Career ==
From 2011, Moshkovich competed in World Cup races in paracycling, initially for Russia. At the 2012 Summer Paralympics in London, she took third place in the time trial; in the road race she finished sixth. In 2015 she won the world title in the time trial, and she won further medals at world championships and other races. In 2021 she competed in the Paralympics in Tokyo, finishing fourth in the road race and ninth in the time trial.

In 2015, 2018 and 2023, Moshkovich won the overall World Cup ranking. In September 2023 she was granted permission to compete for Austria in major events such as the Paralympics and World Championships. For 2024 she plans to compete in the Paralympics in Paris and set an hour world record.

== Honors ==
In 2023, Moshkovich was named Austrian Paracyclist of the Year.
