= Katia Aere =

Italian para-cyclist (born 1971)

Personal information
- Nationality: Italian
- Born: 28 August 1971 (age 55)

Sport
- Sport: Para-cycling
- Disability class: H5
- Club: ASD Polisportiva Trivium Spilimbergo
- Coached by: Mario Valentini
Medal record
Representing Italy
Women's para-cycling
Paralympic Games
| Bronze medal – third place | 2020 Tokyo | Road race H5 |
Road World Championships
| Bronze medal – third place | 2021 Cascais | Road race H5 |
| Bronze medal – third place | 2021 Cascais | Time trial H5 |
| Bronze medal – third place | 2022 Baie-Comeau | Time trial H5 |
European Championships
| Bronze medal – third place | 2023 Rotterdam | Time trial H5 |
| Bronze medal – third place | 2023 Rotterdam | Road race H5 |
Women's freediving
World Games
| Silver medal – second place | 2025 Chengdu | DNF |

Katia Aere (born 28 August 1971) is an Italian Para-cyclist. She represented Italy at the 2020 Summer Paralympics.

== Career ==
Aere competed in Paralympic swimming and trained with ASD Polisportiva Trivium

Aere represented Italy in the women's road race H5 event at the 2020 Summer Paralympics and won a bronze medal.
