= Jana Majunke =

German Paralympic cyclist

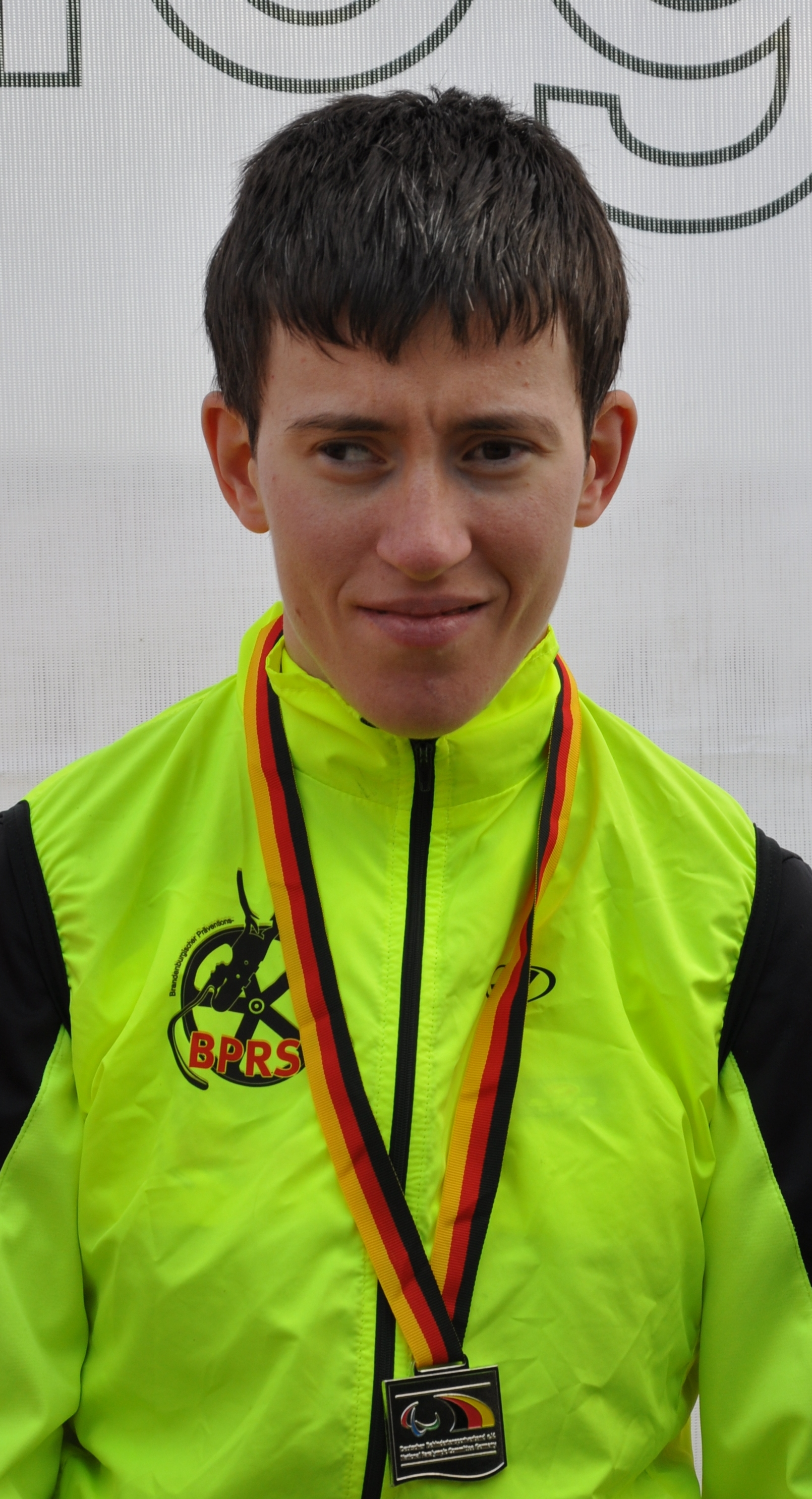
- Majunke in 2016

Personal information
- Nationality: German
- Born: 21 August 1990 (age 35) Cottbus, Germany

Sport
- Country: Germany
- Sport: Cycling
Medal record
Paralympic Games
Gold medal – first place	2020 Tokyo	Time trial T1–2
Gold medal – first place	2020 Tokyo	Road race T1–2
Bronze medal – third place	2016 Rio de Janeiro	Road race T1–2
Road World Championships
Bronze medal – third place	2023 Glasgow	Road race T2
Bronze medal – third place	2025 Ronse	Time trial T2

Jana Majunke (born 21 August 1990) is a German Paralympic cyclist.

== Career ==
Majunke competed at the 2016 Paralympic Games where she won a bronze medal in the women's road race T1–2 event and at the 2020 Paralympic Games where she won gold medals in the Women's road time trial T1–2 and road race T1–2 events.
