= Cycling at the 2016 Summer Paralympics – Men's road time trial H5 =

Cycling, men's road time trial H5 at the XV Paralympic Games
- Venue: Flamengo Park
- Dates: 14 September
- Competitors: 10 from 9 nations

Medalists
1st place, gold medalist(s)		Alessandro Zanardi	Italy
2nd place, silver medalist(s)		Stuart Tripp	Australia
3rd place, bronze medalist(s)		Oscar Sanchez	United States

The Men's time trial H5 road cycling event at the 2016 Summer Paralympics took place on 14 September at Flamengo Park, Pontal. Twelve riders from nine nations competed.

The H5 category is a handcycle class is for cyclists with lower limb disabilities, such as amputation, but more or less full trunk stability.

== Results : Men's road time trial H5 ==
Rank	Name	Nationality	Time	Deficit	Avg. Speed
1st place, gold medalist(s)	Alessandro Zanardi	Italy	28:36.81	0	41.938
2nd place, silver medalist(s)	Stuart Tripp	Australia	28:39.55	2.74	41.871
3rd place, bronze medalist(s)	Oscar Sanchez	United States	28:51.73	14.92	41.577
4	Tim de Vries	Netherlands	29:02.96	26.15	41.309
5	Ernst Van Dyk	South Africa	29:26.31	49.5	40.763
6	Jetze Plat	Netherlands	29:28.26	51.45	40.718
7	Alfredo de los Santos	United States	31:01.34	+2:24.53	38.682
8	Luis Costa	Portugal	31:06.06	+2:29.25	38.584
9	Johan Reekers	Netherlands	31:40.20	+3:03.39	37.891
10	Primoz Jeralic	Slovenia	33:35.96	+4:59.15	35.715
