= Cycling at the 2012 Summer Paralympics – Men's road race H4 =

Cycling, Men's road race H4 at the XIV Paralympic Games
- Venue: Brands Hatch
- Dates: September 7, 2012
- Competitors: 10 from 9 nations

Medalists
1st place, gold medalist(s)		Alex Zanardi	Italy
2nd place, silver medalist(s)		Ernst van Dyk	South Africa
3rd place, bronze medalist(s)		Wim Decleir	Belgium

The Men's road race H4 cycling event at the 2012 Summer Paralympics took place on September 7 at Brands Hatch. Ten riders from nine different nations competed. The race distance was 64 km.

== Results ==
LAP=Lapped (8 km).

Rank	Name	Country	Time
1st place, gold medalist(s)	Alex Zanardi	Italy	2:00:32
2nd place, silver medalist(s)	Ernst van Dyk	South Africa	2:00:33
3rd place, bronze medalist(s)	Wim Decleir	Belgium	2:00:35
4	Jetze Plat	Netherlands	2:00:35
5	Oscar Sanchez	United States	2:00:35
6	Norbert Mosandl	Germany	2:00:35
7	Johan Reekers	Netherlands	2:00:35
8	Stuart Tripp	Australia	2:00:35
9	Nati Groberg	Israel	2:11:58
10	Lassane Gasbeogo	Burkina Faso	LAP
