= Cycling at the 2016 Summer Paralympics – Men's road race H5 =

Cycling, Men's road race H5 at the XV Paralympic Games
- Venue: Pontal, Rio
- Dates: September 17
- Competitors: 10

The men's road race H5 cycling event at the 2016 Summer Paralympics took place on September 17 at Pontal, Rio. Ten riders competed. The race distance was 60 kilometres (37 mi) long.

Rank	Name	Nationality	Classification	Time	Deficit
1	Ernst Van Dyk	South Africa	H5	01:37:49	0
2	Alessandro Zanardi	Italy	H5	s.t.	s.t.
3	Jetze Plat	Netherlands	H5	s.t.	s.t.
4	Oscar Sanchez	United States	H5	01:37:51	2
5	Johan Reekers	Netherlands	H5	s.t.	s.t.
6	Alfredo de los Santos	United States	H5	s.t.	s.t.
7	Stuart Tripp	Australia	H5	s.t.	s.t.
8	Luis Costa	Portugal	H5	01:37:56	7
9	Tim De Vries	Netherlands	H5	s.t.	s.t.
10	Primoz Jeralic	Slovenia	H5	01:54:42	16:53:00
