= Cycling at the 2016 Summer Paralympics – Women's road race H1–4 =

Cycling, Women's road race H1-4 at the XV Paralympic Games
- Venue: Pontal, Rio
- Dates: September 17

The women's road race H1-2-3-4 cycling event at the 2016 Summer Paralympics took place on September 17 at Pontal, Rio. The race distance was 60 km.

== Results : Women's road race H1-2-3-4 ==
Rank	Name	Nationality	Classification	Time	Deficit
1st place, gold medalist(s)	Christiane Reppe	Germany	H4	01:15:56	0
2nd place, silver medalist(s)	Lee Do-yeon	South Korea	H4	01:15:58	+2
3rd place, bronze medalist(s)	Francesca Porcellato	Italy	H3	01:15:58	s.t.
4	Alicia Dana	United States	H3	01:16:01	+5
5	Renata Kaluza	Poland	H3	01:16:46	+50
6	Huaxian Li	China	H3	01:22:17	+06:21
7	Sandra Graf	Switzerland	H4	01:23:41	+07:45
8	Sandra Stoeckli	Switzerland	H4	01:26:08	+10:12
9	Katerina Antosova	Czech Republic	H3	01:26:25	+10:29
10	Jady Martins Malavazzi	Brazil	H3	01:27:19	+11:23
11	Anna Oroszova	Slovakia	H3	01:28:57	+13:01
12	Justine Asher	South Africa	H2	01:37:36	+21:40
13	Mikyoung Jeon	South Korea	H2	01:56:08	+40:12
14	Ciara Staunton	Ireland	H2	-1LAP	
	Karen Darke	Great Britain	H3	DNF	
