= Slovenia at the 2016 Summer Paralympics =

- IPC code: SLO
- NPC: Sports Federation for the Disabled of Slovenia
- Website: www.zsis.si

in Rio de Janeiro
- Competitors: 8 in 5 sports
- Medals Ranked 58th: Gold 1 Silver 1 Bronze 0 Total 2

Summer Paralympics appearances (overview)
- 1992; 1996; 2000; 2004; 2008; 2012; 2016; 2020; 2024

Other related appearances
- Yugoslavia (1972–2000)

Slovenia competed at the 2016 Summer Paralympics in Rio de Janeiro, from 7 September to 18 September 2016. Sports they qualified athletes to compete at included shooting.

== Disability classifications ==
Every participant at the Paralympics has their disability grouped into one of five disability categories; amputation, the condition may be congenital or sustained through injury or illness; cerebral palsy; wheelchair athletes, there is often overlap between this and other categories; visual impairment, including blindness; Les autres, any physical disability that does not fall strictly under one of the other categories, for example dwarfism or multiple sclerosis. Each Paralympic sport then has its own classifications, dependent upon the specific physical demands of competition. Events are given a code, made of numbers and letters, describing the type of event and classification of the athletes competing. Some sports, such as athletics, divide athletes by both the category and severity of their disabilities, other sports, for example swimming, group competitors from different categories together, the only separation being based on the severity of the disability.

== Medalists ==
Medal	Name	Sport	Event	Date
Gold	Veselka Pevec	Shooting	Mixed 10 m air rifle standing SH2	10 September
Silver	Franček Gorazd Tiršek	Shooting	Mixed 10 m air rifle standing SH2	10 September

Medals by sport
Sport	Gold medal	Silver medal	Bronze medal	Total
Shooting	1	1	0	2

Medals by day
Day	Date	1st place, gold medalist(s)	2nd place, silver medalist(s)	3rd place, bronze medalist(s)	Total
1	8 September	0	0	0	0
2	9 September	0	0	0	0
3	10 September	1	1	0	2
4	11 September	0	0	0	0
5	12 September	0	0	0	0
6	13 September	0	0	0	0
7	14 September	0	0	0	0
8	15 September	0	0	0	0
9	16 September	0	0	0	0
10	17 September	0	0	0	0
11	18 September	0	0	0	0
Total		1	1	0	2

== Competitors ==
The following is the list of number of competitors participating at the Games:

Sport	Men	Women	Total
Athletics	1	0	1
Cycling	1	0	1
Paracanoeing	1	0	1
Shooting	3	1	4
Swimming	1	0	1
Total	7	1	8

== Athletics ==
Men's Road Events

Athlete	Events	Final	
Athlete	Events	Time	Rank
Sandi Novak	Marathon T11-12	3:02:36	8

== Cycling ==
=== Road ===
Athlete	Event	Time	Rank
Primož Jeralič	Men's road race H5	1:54:42	10
Primož Jeralič	Men's time trial H5	33:35.96	10

== Paracanoeing ==
Athlete	Event	Heats		Semifinal		Final	
Athlete	Event	Time	Rank	Time	Rank	Time	Rank
Dejan Fabčič	Men's KL2	48.131	3 QS	48.633	2 FA	47.420	6

== Shooting ==
The first opportunity to qualify for shooting at the Rio Games took place at the 2014 IPC Shooting World Championships in Suhl. Shooters earned spots for their NPC. Slovenia earned a pair of qualifying spot at this event in the R4 – 10m Air Rifle Standing Mixed SH2 event as a result of the performances of Franček Gorazd Tiršek and Veselka Pevec.

The country sent shooters to 2015 IPC IPC Shooting World Cup in Osijek, Croatia, where Rio direct qualification was also available. They earned a qualifying spot at this event based on the performance of Damjan Pavlin in the R5 – 10m Air Rifle Prone Mixed SH2 event. Franc Pinter earned a second spot for Slovenia at this competition in the R7 – 50m Rifle 3 Positions SH1 Men.

Athlete	Event	Qualification		Final	
Athlete	Event	Score	Rank	Score	Rank
Franc Pinter	Men's 10 m air rifle standing SH1	613.8	11	did not advance	
Franc Pinter	Men's 50 m rifle 3 positions SH1	1122	18	did not advance	
Franc Pinter	Mixed 10 m air rifle prone SH1	626.6	29	did not advance	
Franc Pinter	Mixed 50 metre rifle prone SH1	595.8	38	did not advance	
Damjan Pavlin	Mixed 10 m air rifle standing SH2	Disqualified		did not advance	
Damjan Pavlin	Mixed 10 m air rifle prone SH2	628.8	21	did not advance	
Veselka Pevec	Mixed 10 m air rifle standing SH2	634.9	1 Q	211.0	1st place, gold medalist(s)
Veselka Pevec	Mixed 10 m air rifle prone SH2	632.7	13	did not advance	
Franček Gorazd Tiršek	Mixed 10 m air rifle standing SH2	634.5	2 Q	210.8	2nd place, silver medalist(s)
Franček Gorazd Tiršek	Mixed 10 m air rifle prone SH2	635.1	4 Q	104.1	7

== Swimming ==
Men

Athlete	Events	Heats		Final	
Athlete	Events	Time	Rank	Time	Rank
Darko Đurić	50 m freestyle S4	—N/a		41.21	4
Darko Đurić	100 m freestyle S4	1:28.26	4 Q	1:27.17	5
Darko Đurić	50 m butterfly S5	40.99	8 Q	40.92	8

== See also ==
- Slovenia at the 2016 Summer Olympics
