= Alex Zanardi =

Italian racing driver and para-cyclist (1966–2026)

Alex Zanardi OMRI
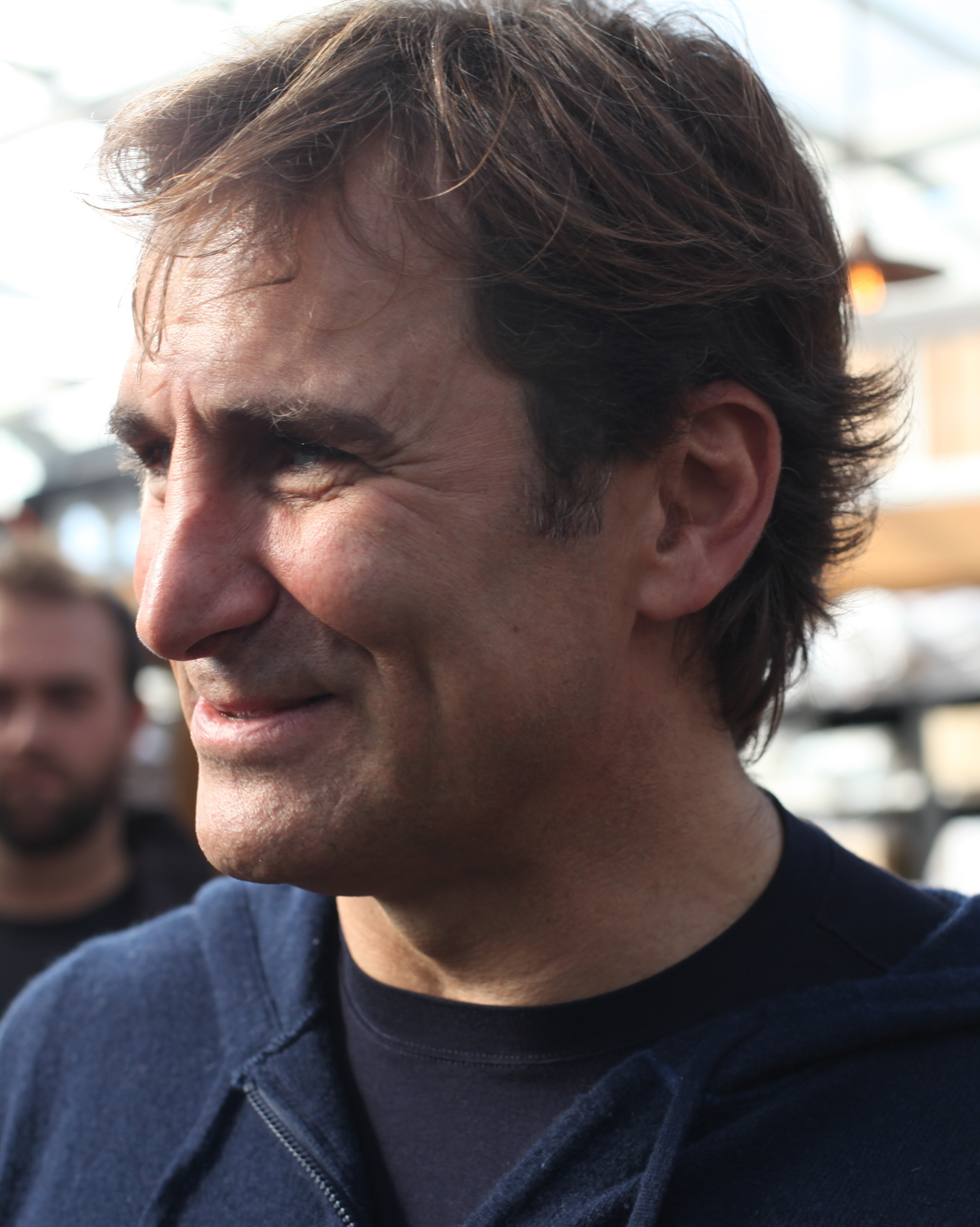
- Zanardi in 2011
- Born: Alessandro Leone Zanardi; 23 October 1966; Bologna, Emilia-Romagna, Italy
- Died: 1 May 2026 (aged 59); Padua, Veneto, Italy
- Spouse: Daniela Manni (m. 1996)
- Children: 1
- Awards: Full list

Formula One World Championship career
- Nationality: (Italy) Italian
- Active years: 1991–1994, 1999
- Team(s): Jordan, Minardi, Lotus, Williams
- Entries: 44 (41 starts)
- Championships: 0
- Wins: 0
- Podiums: 0
- Career points: 1
- Pole positions: 0
- Fastest laps: 0
- First entry: 1991 Spanish Grand Prix
- Last entry: 1999 Japanese Grand Prix

Champ Car career
- 66 races run over 4 years
- Years active: 1996–1998, 2001
- Teams: Chip Ganassi Racing, Mo Nunn Racing
- Best finish: 1st (1997, 1998)
- First race: 1996 Marlboro Grand Prix of Miami (Homestead)
- Last race: 2001 American Memorial (Lausitz)
- First win: 1996 Budweiser/G. I. Joe's 200 (Portland)
- Last win: 1998 Honda Indy 300 (Surfers Paradise)
Wins	Podiums	Poles
15	28	10

World Touring Car Championship career
- Years active: 2005–2009
- Teams: ROAL
- Starts: 105
- Wins: 4
- Podiums: 10
- Poles: 1
- Fastest laps: 4
- Best finish: 10th in 2005

Previous series
- 2018; 2014–2015; 1992–2006 (Note: The exact years Zanardi competed in Italian Superturismo: 1992, 2005–2006.); 2003–2005; 1989, 1991; 1988–1990: DTM; Blancpain GT; Italian Superturismo; ETCC; International F3000; Italian F3

Championship titles
- 2005; 1990: Italian Superturismo; European F3 Cup
Medal record
Men's para-cycling
Representing Italy
Event	1st	2nd	3rd
Paralympic Games	4	2	0
World Championships	12	5	1
Total	16	7	1
Paralympic Games
Gold medal – first place	2012 London	Road time trial (H4)
Gold medal – first place	2012 London	Road race (H4)
Gold medal – first place	2016 Rio de Janeiro	Road time trial (H5)
Gold medal – first place	2016 Rio de Janeiro	Mixed team relay (H2–5)
Silver medal – second place	2012 London	Mixed team relay (H1–H4)
Silver medal – second place	2016 Rio de Janeiro	Road race (H5)
World Championships
Gold medal – first place	2013 Baie-Comeau	Time trial (H5)
Gold medal – first place	2013 Baie-Comeau	Relay (H5)
Gold medal – first place	2013 Baie-Comeau	Road race (H5)
Gold medal – first place	2014 Greenville	Time trial (H5)
Gold medal – first place	2014 Greenville	Relay (H5)
Gold medal – first place	2015 Nottwil	Time trial (H5)
Gold medal – first place	2015 Nottwil	Road race (H5)
Gold medal – first place	2015 Nottwil	Relay (H5)
Gold medal – first place	2017 Pietermaritzburg	Road race (H5)
Gold medal – first place	2017 Pietermaritzburg	Relay (H5)
Gold medal – first place	2019 Emmen	Time trial (H5)
Gold medal – first place	2019 Emmen	Relay (H5)
Silver medal – second place	2011 Roskilde	Time trial (H4)
Silver medal – second place	2014 Greenville	Road race (H5)
Silver medal – second place	2017 Pietermaritzburg	Time trial (H5)
Silver medal – second place	2018 Maniago	Relay (H5)
Silver medal – second place	2019 Emmen	Road race (H5)
Bronze medal – third place	2018 Maniago	Time trial (H5)

Alessandro Leone Zanardi (Italian pronunciation: [ˈaːleks dzaˈnardi]; 23 October 1966 – 1 May 2026) was an Italian racing driver and para-cyclist who competed in Formula One between 1991 and 1999, (Note: The exact years Zanardi competed in Formula One: 1991–1994, 1999.) in CART between 1996 and 2001, (Note: The exact years Zanardi competed in CART: 1996–1998, 2001.) in the World Touring Car Championship from 2005 to 2009, and at two editions of the Summer Paralympics in 2012 and 2016. In American open-wheel racing, Zanardi won two CART national championship titles in 1997 and 1998 with Chip Ganassi Racing. In para-cycling, he won four Paralympic gold medals and 12 UCI Road World Championships.

After a brief career in kart racing and junior formulae—where he won the CIK-FIA European Championship in 1987 and the FIA European F3 Cup in 1990—Zanardi contested Formula One from 1991 to 1994 and again in 1999; his best result was a sixth-place finish in the 1993 Brazilian Grand Prix. Between these spells, he won two titles and 15 races in CART. Upon his return to CART in 2001, a major crash in the 2001 American Memorial at the Lausitzring resulted in the amputation of both his legs. He returned to racing less than two years after the accident, competing in European Touring Car from 2003 to 2005 before a five-year stint in the World Touring Car Championship, where he scored four victories. He received the Laureus World Sports Award for Comeback of the Year in the latter year.

In addition to continuing his motor racing career, Zanardi began handcycling, with the stated goal of representing Italy at the 2012 Summer Paralympics. He soon began taking international medals before winning two golds at the Paralympics, which he repeated in 2016. He additionally won 12 UCI Para-cycling Road World Championships in various categories between 2013 and 2019. In June 2020, Zanardi was involved in a road collision while competing in the Obiettivo Tricolore handcycling race; he underwent three hours of neurosurgery before being placed in an induced coma. He returned home for rehabilitation 18 months later and died nearly six years after the accident. In addition to being appointed a Knight Grand Cross of the Order of Merit of the Italian Republic in 2014, Zanardi was inducted into the Motorsports Hall of Fame of America in 2013 and the Long Beach Motorsports Walk of Fame in 2022.

== Early life ==
Alessandro Leone Zanardi was born on 23 October 1966 in Bologna, the capital and largest city of Emilia-Romagna, Italy. His father, Dino Zanardi, was a plumber, while his mother, Anna, was a shirtmaker. His family moved to the suburb of Castel Maggiore when he was three years old. His sister, Cristina, was a promising swimmer prior to her death in an automobile collision in 1979.

Zanardi began kart racing when he was 13 years old. He built his first kart from the wheels of a dustbin and pipes from his father's work as a plumber. He dominated the top class of the CIK-FIA European Championship in 1987, with victories in all five rounds. In 1988, he progressed to the Italian Formula Three Championship, with a fifth-place as his highest finish as he clinched seventh overall. He took two pole positions and three podiums, repeating this result in 1989; his team had switched to unleaded fuel, which reduced his car's engine power. In 1991, he advanced to International Formula 3000 with Il Barone Rampante, themselves newcomers to the series. He won his debut F3000 race, scoring two more wins that season and finishing second in the championship to Christian Fittipaldi.

== Motor racing ==
=== Formula One (1991–1994) ===
After testing for the Footwork team, Zanardi mounted a strong season in F3000. Eddie Jordan looked to replace Roberto Moreno for the remainder of the 1991 season, bringing in Zanardi for the last three races at Jordan. Zanardi finished two of them, both in 9th place. In 1992, however, Zanardi had to be content with guest drives for Minardi, replacing the injured Christian Fittipaldi. In the off-season, he tested for Benetton, but he contracted with Lotus for 1993. He later stated that in hindsight, he should have stayed on as the Benetton test driver as he would likely have been given a full-time drive for 1994 following Riccardo Patrese's retirement, where he would have been in a race-winning car alongside that year's world champion Michael Schumacher.

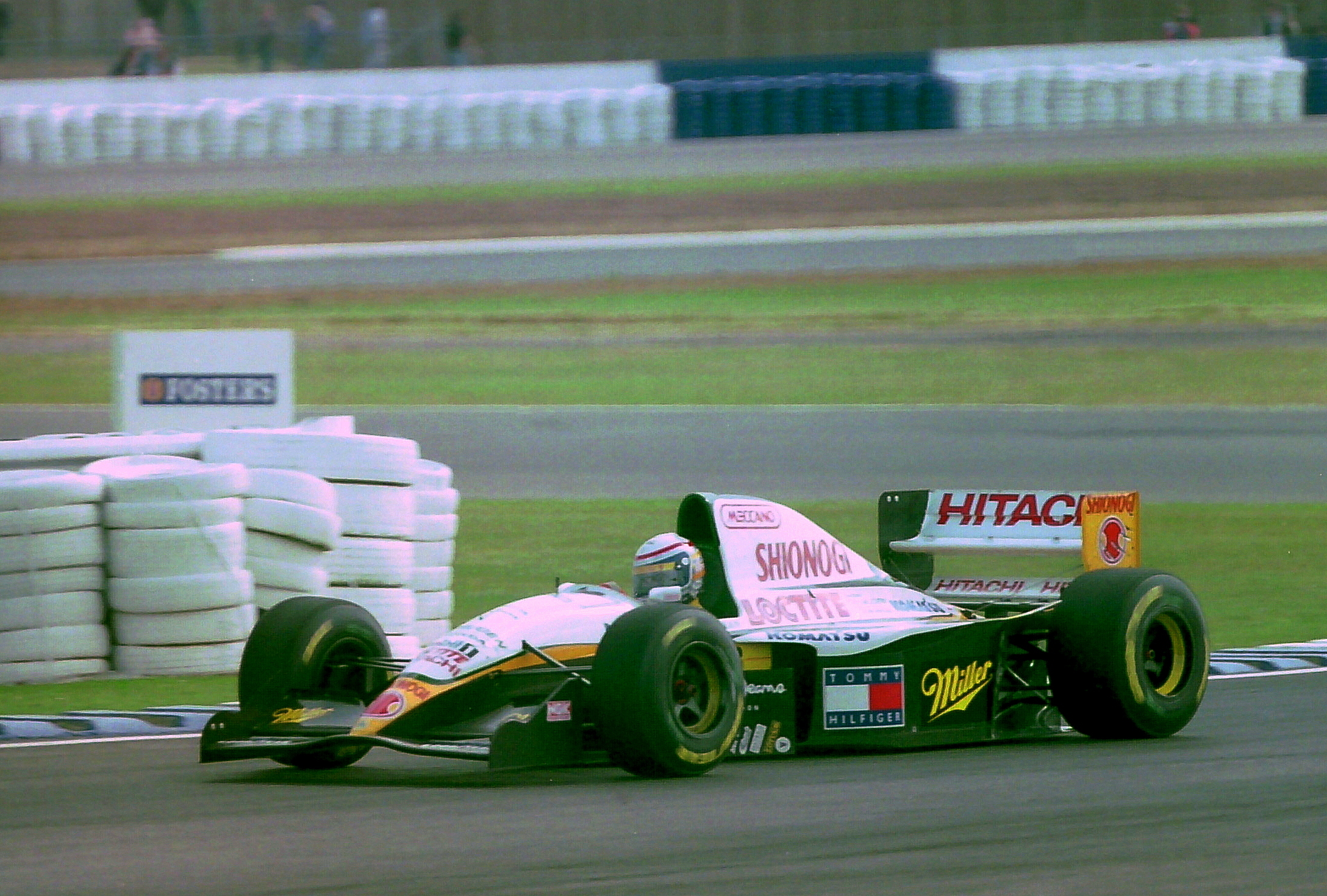
Zanardi driving for Lotus at the 1994 British Grand Prix.

Zanardi compared reasonably to teammate Johnny Herbert in 1993 and was important in fine-tuning the team's active suspension system, scoring his only F1 point at the Brazilian Grand Prix. He was injured when an elderly motorist collided with his bicycle, knocking him down and running over Zanardi's left foot. Despite several broken bones, Zanardi raced in Germany, but he spun out and did not finish. Zanardi's season ended prematurely after he sustained a concussion as a result of a crash in practice for the Belgian Grand Prix.

Still recovering, Zanardi missed the beginning of the 1994 season while he was working as a test driver for Lotus, but he returned in the Spanish Grand Prix, replacing Pedro Lamy, who had been injured in a testing crash. However, Lotus struggled in its final season in F1 and Zanardi failed to score a single point or qualify higher than 13th. For the races in Belgium and Portugal, Zanardi was replaced by Belgian pay driver Philippe Adams.

With Lotus Formula One defunct, Zanardi practised to race in sports car racing. His first meeting was at a Porsche Supercup event at Imola. Zanardi later raced at a four-hour event at Donington Park, where he and Alex Portman retired with eight minutes remaining despite leading by over a lap. The pair managed to finish fourth at a rainy day race at Silverstone.

=== CART Championship series ===
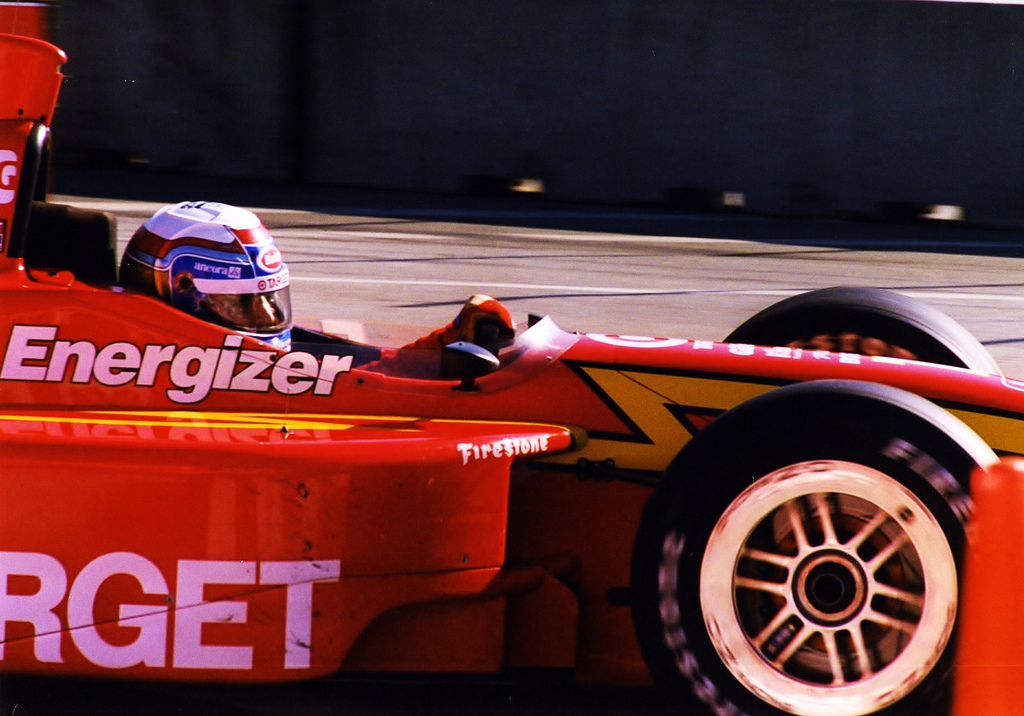
Zanardi racing in Vancouver

In 1995, Zanardi went to the United States for a drive in the CART Series. He felt that finding a race seat would be easy with Formula One experience, but drew no interest from any team. However, Reynard Commercial Director Rick Gorne managed to secure Zanardi a test drive at Homestead with Chip Ganassi Racing. Zanardi signed a contract on 23 October 1995. The team's race engineer Mo Nunn advised Chip against signing him, as he believed Italian drivers were too prone to mistakes.

Zanardi rapidly became one of the series' most popular drivers. He took the pole for his second race, although his first win did not come until mid-season. Overall, he won three races in his rookie season and six pole positions, finishing third in the championship behind teammate Jimmy Vasser and Michael Andretti. He and Andretti were level on points but Andretti took second place by virtue of having five race wins compared to Zanardi's three. Zanardi was named Rookie of the Year. A win came at Mazda Raceway Laguna Seca in the final race of the 1996 season, where Zanardi conducted a highly risky overtake at the Corkscrew corner (known to many racing fans as "The Pass"; the maneuver was banned for future years), on race leader Bryan Herta, having fought his way through the field.

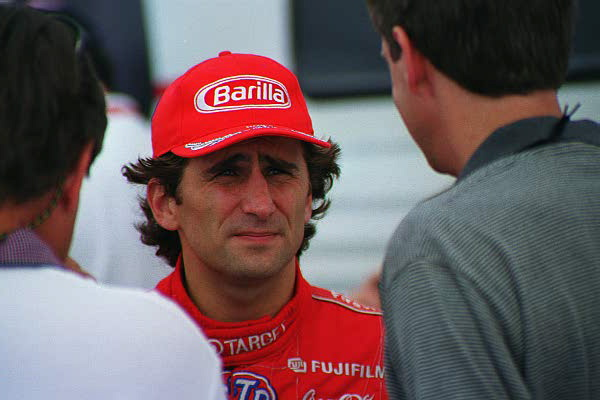
Zanardi at the 1998 CART grand prix in Laguna Seca

Zanardi improved his form in CART in 1997, winning five of seventeen races, including three in a row and four of the five rounds held in the mid to late portion of the season en route to winning the Drivers' Championship. In 1998, Zanardi was even more dominant in his Ganassi Reynard-Honda, winning 7 of 19 races with an incredible 15 podiums in those 19 races. He won four races in a row in June and July en route to his second consecutive CART title, the third in a row for Ganassi and Honda, and the fourth for Reynard.

After winning a race, Zanardi was fond of spinning his car around in tight circles, leaving circular doughnut-shaped patterns of tyre rubber on the track; Zanardi became known as "the Donut King" for this practice. This would eventually become a popular means of celebrating race wins all across the USA.

=== Return to Formula One ===
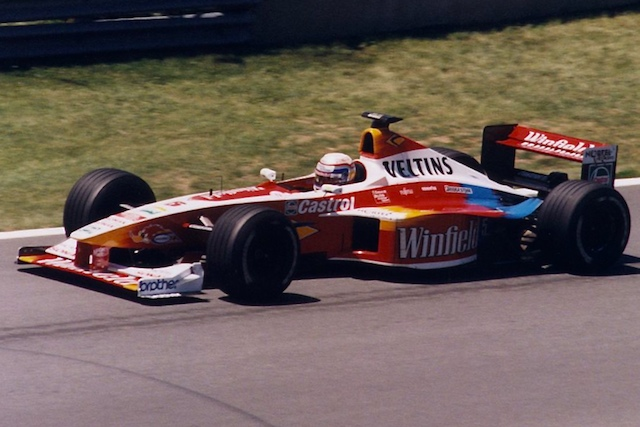
Zanardi driving for Williams at the 1999 Canadian Grand Prix

Zanardi's CART success caught the attention of Sir Frank Williams, with whom he made contact in 1997, to inform them he would be available for contract negotiations if needed. Williams visited Zanardi, who signed a three-year contract in July 1998, which was publicly confirmed in September of that year. He began testing at the end of that year alongside test driver Juan Pablo Montoya. Zanardi also received offers from BAR and Honda. In Australia, Zanardi was ninth quickest in the first free practice session but had limited track time due to reliability issues and traffic in qualifying meant he could only start 15th. He showed promise in the warm-up with sixth, but the race saw him crash out on lap 21. Moving on to Brazil, Zanardi once again experienced limited time on the track, which was mainly due to engine issues. He started 16th and retired with a differential failure. Zanardi also incurred a $5,000 fine for speeding in the pit lane.

At Imola, Zanardi's form improved with a start position of tenth. The race itself threw up a surprise for Zanardi. His car was suffering electronic issues and ran a steady seventh in the closing stages, however he ran over oil from Johnny Herbert's Stewart at the Villeneuve chicane and spun out into the gravel. Zanardi out-qualified Schumacher at Monaco by over half a second. More drama occurred on race day as the seat in his Williams broke off during the early stages of the race but he managed to finish eighth and last of the runners. In Spain, despite setting the fifth-quickest lap in first free practice, a wrong set-up placed Zanardi 17th in qualifying. His car's gearbox seized after a pit stop. Similar problems occurred in Canada, where Friday practice running was limited. Managing to out-qualify Schumacher, Zanardi's race was incident-filled. Whilst running in eighth, he spun off into the gravel trap early on and dropped to last. Further time was lost when leaving the pit lane during a safety car period and receiving a stop-go penalty. A further excursion occurred when a manoeuvre on Luca Badoer's Minardi ended with Zanardi crashing out.

The wet qualifying for the French Grand Prix saw Zanardi qualify 15th after the Williams team misread conditions and aquaplaned during the race. At Silverstone, Zanardi qualified 13th and finished 11th. In Austria, he started 14th. In the first part of the race, Zanardi's radio communications failed and around lap 33, his team hung out pit boards, calling him in to pit, but a battle with Pedro Diniz distracted Zanardi, causing him to miss the board twice, and he eventually ran out of fuel. Mechanical failures saw Zanardi with premature exits from the next two races before he finished eighth in Belgium.

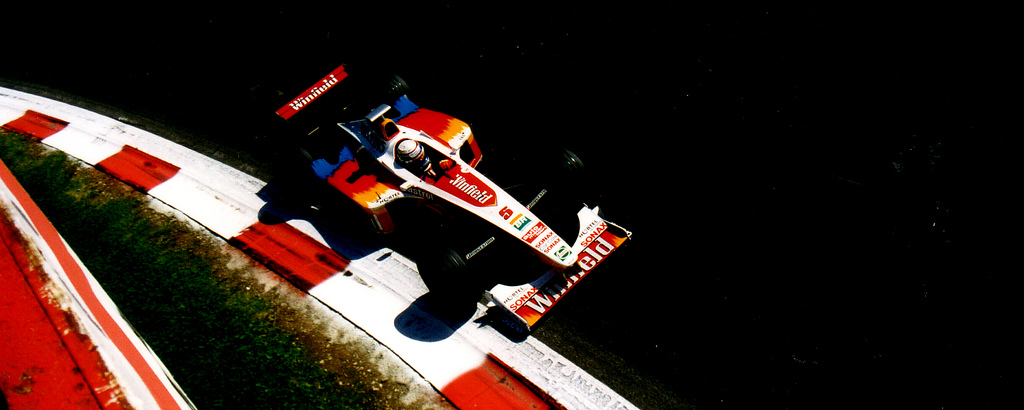
Zanardi at a pre-Grand Prix test at Monza in 1999

At Monza, Zanardi qualified fourth ahead of teammate Ralf Schumacher. He overtook David Coulthard and Heinz-Harald Frentzen at the start. Frentzen took over second from Zanardi at the Roggia chicane. On the third lap, the floor on the Williams became loose, and he was forced to wave his rivals past, but managed to finish seventh. At the next round at the Nürburgring, Zanardi qualified in 18th, placing blame on traffic. He performed well at the start but had to take avoiding action when Alexander Wurz clipped Pedro Diniz. The incident left Zanardi in last position but he regained positions before his car succumbed to his engine stalling. The penultimate round in Malaysia had seen Zanardi start from 16th with a first-lap collision that damaged his front rim, with a pit-stop preventing better progress. He later ran wide, which caused damage to the car's radiators and prompted another pit-stop with Zanardi finishing tenth.

The final race of the season was in Japan, where he qualified 16th. In the race, Zanardi overtook many of his rivals, driving as high as ninth before his pit-lane limiter activated with the engine shutting off when he attempted to turn off the limiter on the first lap. At the end of the season, Zanardi and the Williams team decided to go their separate ways with an estimated cost of $4 million for the termination of Zanardi's contract. |

=== CART return and Lausitzring crash ===
"When I woke up without legs, I looked at the half that was left, not the half that was lost".
(Original: "Quando mi sono risvegliato senza gambe ho guardato la metà che era rimasta, non la metà che era andata persa".)

In the 2000 season, Zanardi was not signed by a team, but was interested in a CART comeback. He tested for Mo Nunn in July at Sebring, driving for 246 laps and opting to sign with the team for 2001. For most of the season, Zanardi had little success, with three top-ten finishes and a best result of fourth place in the 2001 Molson Indy Toronto. During the 2001 American Memorial at the EuroSpeedway Lausitz on 15 September 2001, Zanardi started from the back of the grid and was gaining an upper hand in the race. After a late pit stop, Zanardi was attempting to merge back onto the track when he accelerated abruptly, lost control of his car, and spun onto the race track into the direct path of Patrick Carpentier. Carpentier was able to avoid him, but Alex Tagliani, who was just behind Carpentier at the time, was not, and Zanardi's car was impacted from the side from behind the front wheel, severing the nose of the car. Zanardi lost both legs (one at and one above the knee) in the impact and nearly three-quarters of his blood volume, though rapid medical intervention saved his life. Further portions of his legs were amputated during three hours of surgery to clean and facilitate closing the wounds.

== Post-amputation racing ==
Zanardi was fitted with two prosthetic limbs and began rehabilitating. Dissatisfied with the limitations of legs available commercially, Zanardi designed and built his own custom legs to allow him to compare the weight and stiffness of various feet to find the ones most suitable for racing. In 2002, CART honoured Zanardi by allowing him to wave the checkered flag in Toronto, Canada. In 2003, Zanardi was ready to take to the track again, with the aid of hand-operated brake and accelerator controls. Before the 2003 German 500 began, Zanardi ceremonially drove the thirteen laps he never finished at the Lausitzring in 2001. His fastest lap time of 37.487 seconds would have qualified him fifth in the actual race.

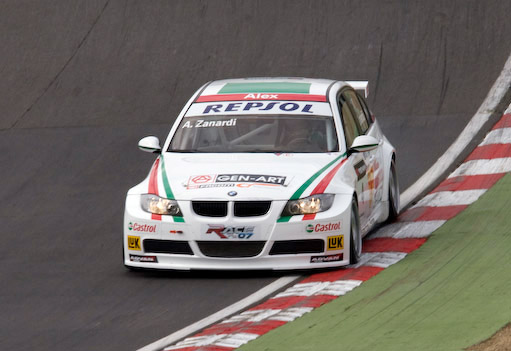
Zanardi driving a BMW 320si WTCC car at Brands Hatch in 2008

Zanardi competed at Monza, Italy, in a round of the 2003 European Touring Car Championship, in his first race since the accident in a touring car modified to allow the use of his prosthetic feet, finishing the race in seventh. In 2004, Zanardi returned to racing full-time, driving for Roberto Ravaglia's BMW Team Italy-Spain in the FIA European Touring Car Championship. In 2005, the series became the World Touring Car Championship by adding two non-European races. On 24 August 2005, Zanardi won his first world series race, celebrating with a series of trademark "donuts". He took further wins at Istanbul in 2006 and Brno in 2008 and 2009. At the end of the 2009 season, he announced his retirement from the WTCC. He took the 2005 Italian Superturismo Championship as organised by the Automobile Club d'Italia with eight victories from twelve races in a Team BMW Italy-entered BMW 320si run by ROAL Motorsport.

Zanardi returned to a Formula One car in late November 2006 at a testing session for BMW Sauber in Valencia, Spain. The car had been specially adapted to have hand controls fitted on the steering wheel. After the drive, Zanardi said that the main problem he was having was using only his right hand to steer through corners, as his left operated the throttle. Zanardi said, "Of course, I know that I won't get a contract with the Formula One team, however having the chance to drive an F1 racer again is just incredible."

In November 2012, Zanardi tested a BMW DTM touring car, completing 32 laps of the Nürburgring. He later said that the test had rekindled his interest in motor racing, and in January 2014, it was announced that he would return to motorsport in the 2014 Blancpain Sprint Series season, racing a BMW Z4 GT3 for Ravaglia's ROAL Motorsport team. In 2018, he made a one-off appearance in the Deutsche Tourenwagen Masters, driving a BMW M4 DTM in the Misano round of the series. After qualifying in last place for both races, he finished 12th out of 13 finishers in the first race before placing fifth in the second race in mixed weather: after the race he said that as radio communication between drivers and the pits is banned in the DTM except when cars are in the pit lane, when his team told him of his fifth-place finish he initially believed it was a joke at his expense.

Zanardi returned to U.S. motor racing by entering the 2019 24 Hours of Daytona that January. Using a similar set of controls as the BMW M4 that he used in the DTM series, the GTLM-specification BMW M8 GTE had a special steering wheel that allowed him to actuate the accelerator with his left hand and shift with his right hand. Brakes were applied with a large handle with by his right hand. The brake handle also had a downshift trigger on it so he could still "engine brake" like his teammates John Edwards, Jesse Krohn, and Chaz Mostert. The team finished 32nd overall and ninth in the GTLM category.

== Handcycling and triathlon ==
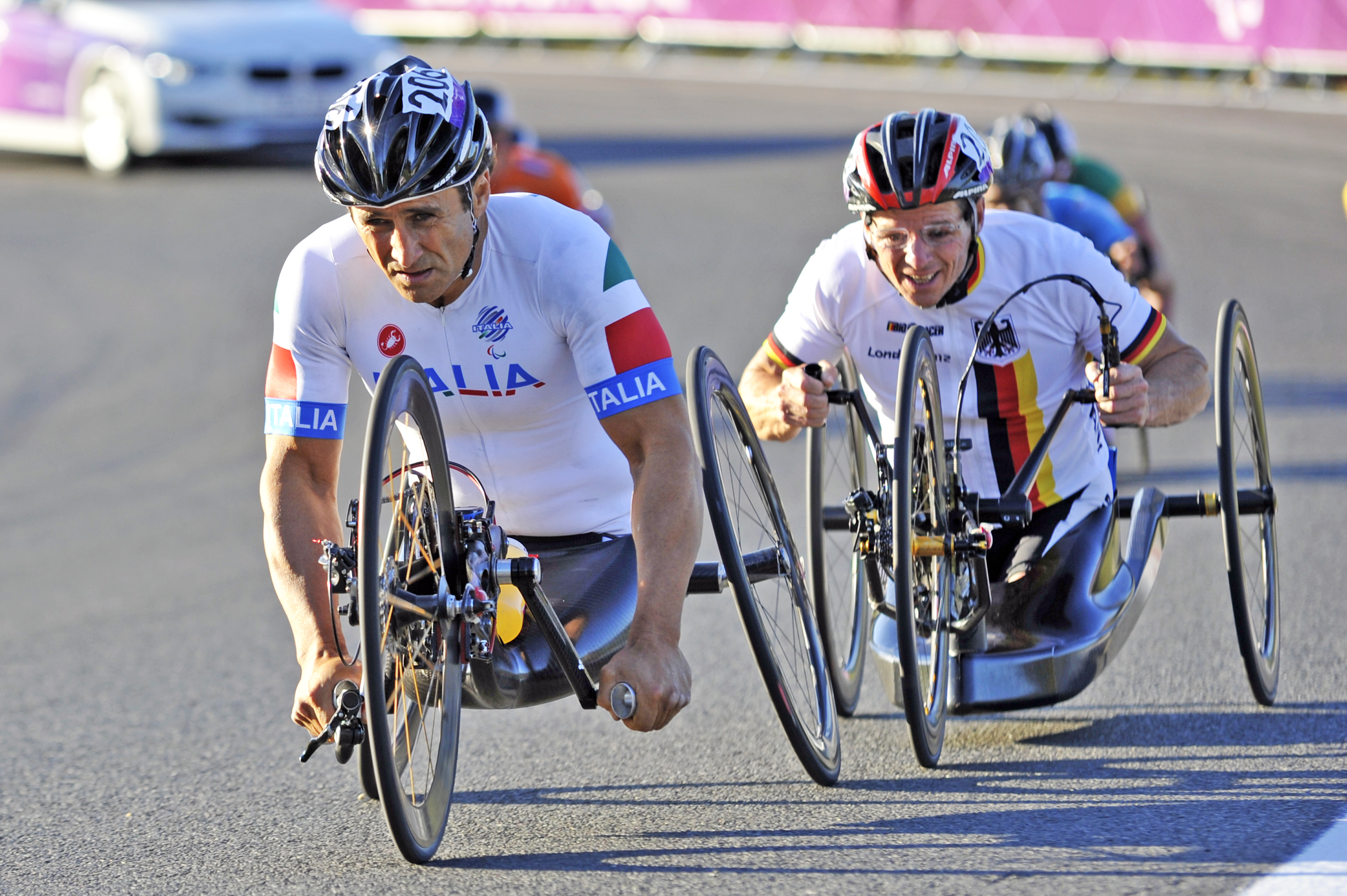
Zanardi (left) at the 2012 Summer Paralympics

After the injuries sustained from his 2001 racing accident, Zanardi decided to return to sport, taking up handcycling. In 2007, he achieved 4th place in the New York City Marathon in the handcycle division, after only four weeks of training. He took up handcycling in earnest and competed at the Para-Cycling Road World Championships in 2009. He stated that he was targeting a place in the Italian team for the 2012 Summer Paralympics. In 2009, he won the Venice Marathon in the category for disabled people, riding his wheelchair in a time of 1:13:56, and won the Rome City Marathon in 2010, in a time of 1:15:53. In 2011, at his fourth attempt, Zanardi won the New York City Marathon in his handcycling class.

On 5 September 2012, Zanardi won a gold medal in the men's road time trial H4 at the 2012 Paralympic Games in London, finishing 27.14 seconds ahead of Nobert Mosandi at Brands Hatch in Kent. Two days later, he won the individual H4 road race, ahead of Ernst van Dyk (South Africa) and Wim Decleir (Belgium), and then a silver medal for Italy in the mixed team relay H1-4 on 8 September 2012. The bike used by Zanardi was constructed by Italian racecar constructor Dallara. As a result, Zanardi was named one of "The Men of the Year 2012" by Top Gear. Zanardi was also voted the best male athlete of the 2012 Paralympics. Before the Games in London, Zanardi expressed interest in returning to auto racing for the 2013 Indianapolis 500; while this failed to pan out, at the event he was presented with his 1996 CART Laguna Seca-winning car by Target Chip Ganassi Racing.

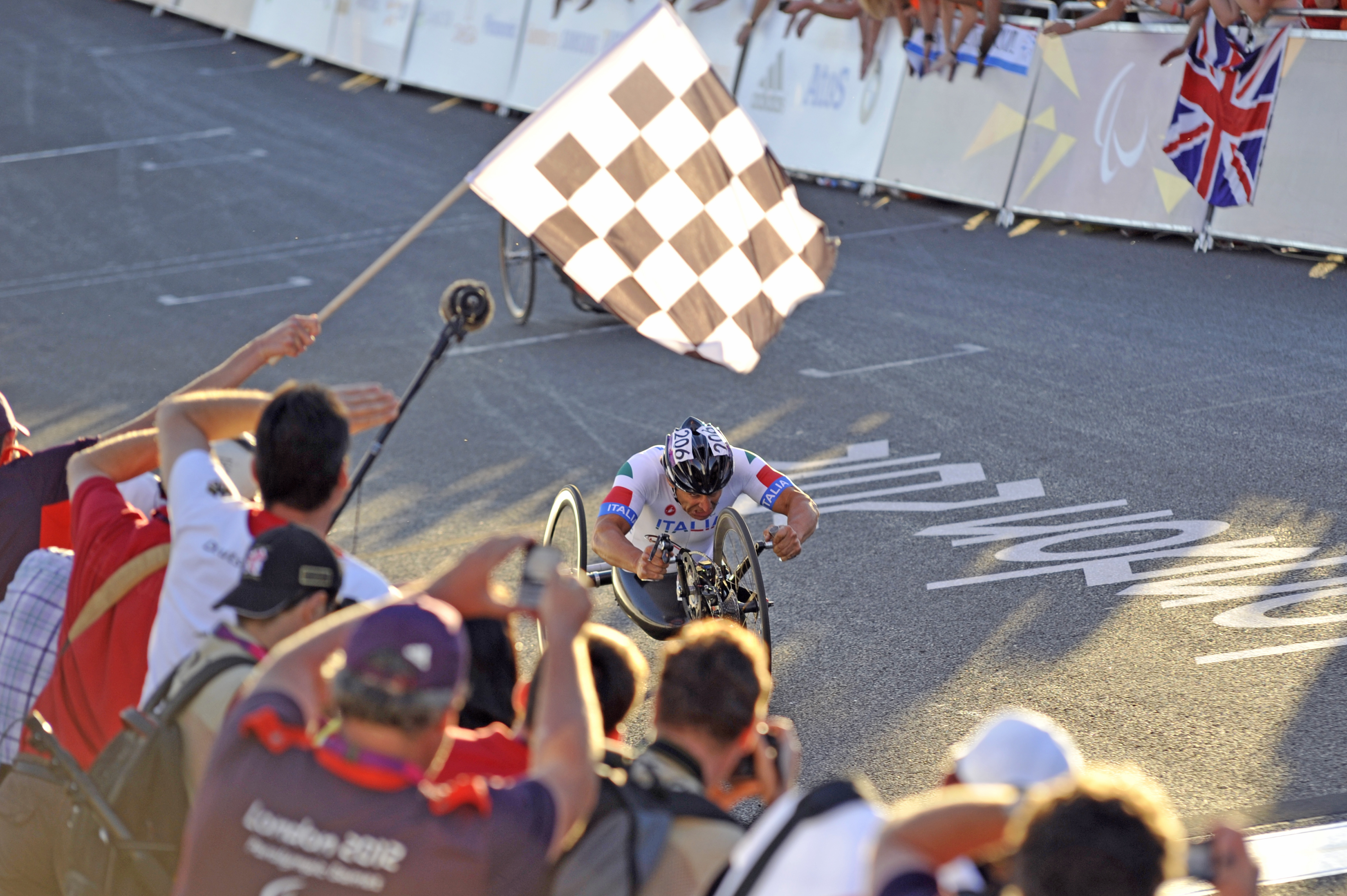
Zanardi won four Paralympic gold medals and 12 world championships in para-cycling.

Zanardi completed the 2014 Ironman World Championship with a time of 9:47:14, ranking 272nd overall and 19th out of 247 in the 45–49-year category. He used a handcycle for the cycling section and a racing wheelchair for the running section. In September 2015, Zanardi announced that he would be taking part in the Berlin Marathon using a recumbent hand cycle. At the 2016 Summer Paralympics in Rio de Janeiro he won the gold medals in the H5 category road cycling men's time trial and mixed team relay, and also silver in the road race. On 22 September 2018, competing in Ironman Italy Emilia-Romagna 2018 Cervia, Italy, Zanardi broke the Ironman world record in the handcycle (HC) division, with a time of 8:26:06. With that time, he also ranked fifth overall in the competition. He competed again in 2019 and improved his time 8:25:30, finishing 8th overall.

=== 2020 cycling accident ===
On 19 June 2020, Zanardi was involved in a serious accident while competing in the Obiettivo tricolore Italian national road race for paralympic athletes. The accident occurred on State Highway 146 between Pienza and San Quirico. According to Gazzetta dello Sport, Zanardi was descending a hill when he lost control of his handcycle and veered into an oncoming truck, leading to severe facial and cranial trauma. Emergency services attended the scene after other competitors helped to raise the alarm, and Zanardi was airlifted to the Santa Maria alle Scotte Hospital in Siena. He was treated in intensive care for serious head injuries.

In September 2020, it was reported that Zanardi was showing signs of interaction but that his condition remained "serious", and that he had undergone several surgeries to reconstruct his face. In November 2020, Zanardi was transferred to a hospital in Padua, which was closer to his home to continue his recovery. In December 2020, it was reported that Zanardi regained his sight and hearing. Furthermore, he could also respond non-verbally to questions and shake hands on demand. In January 2021, it was reported that Zanardi was able to speak again following a waking surgery. In December 2021, 18 months after the accident, he was able to return home in order to continue his rehabilitation. In July 2022, Zanardi was hospitalised after a fire broke out at his home in Italy due to a defect in his home's solar panels which damaged medical equipment he used while recovering from the handcycling crash. He was released back to his home 76 days later in September.

== Personal life ==
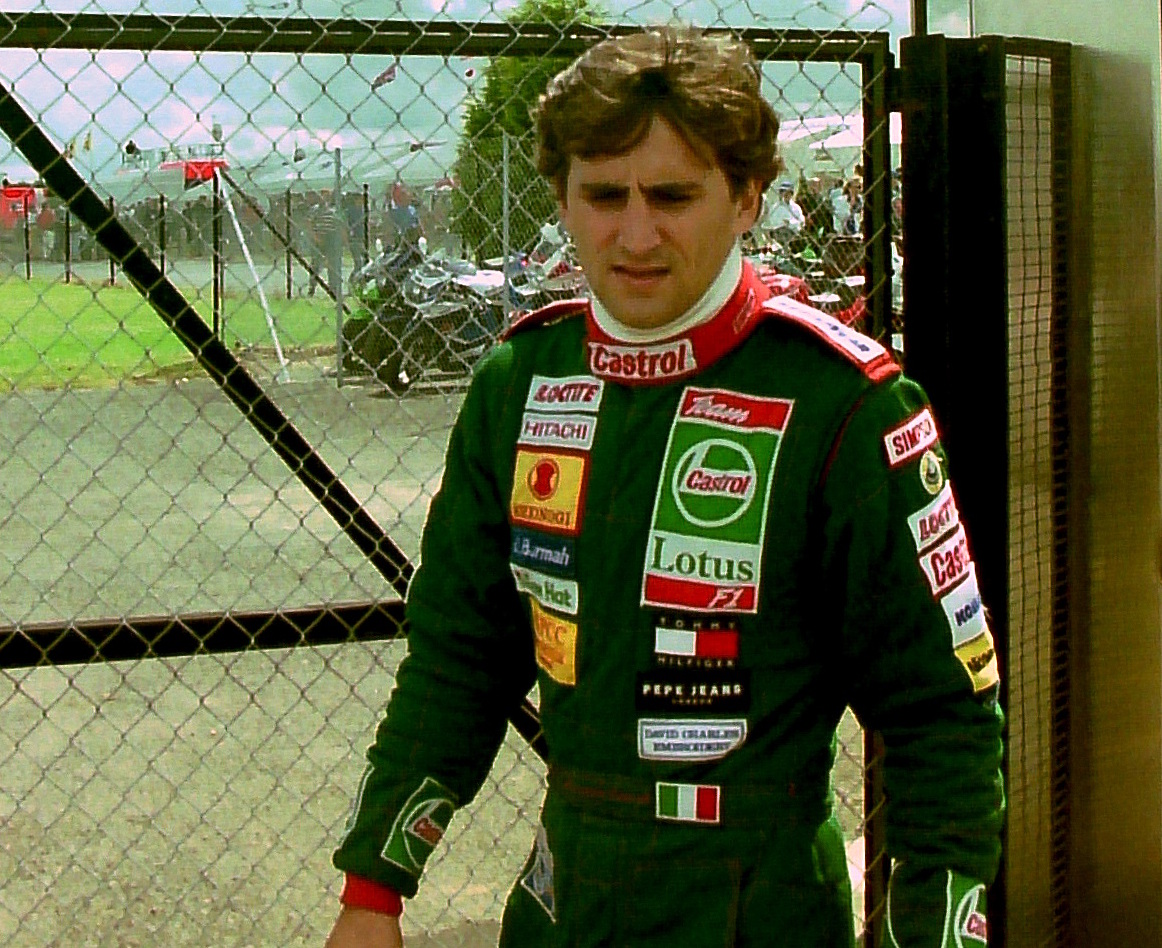
Zanardi at the 1993 British Grand Prix

In 1996, Zanardi married Daniela Manni, with whom he had a son. Zanardi co-wrote two books based on his life, Alex Zanardi: My Story (2004) with Gianluca Gasparini and Alex Zanardi: My Sweetest Victory (2004). Zanardi and his story were featured on the HBO sports series Real Sports with Bryant Gumbel. Zanardi wrote the opening chapters for the books of Steve Olvey, the former CART medical director, including Rapid Response: My Inside Story as a Motor Racing Life Saver. He also started his own brand of go-karts in collaboration with CRG in 2004, which has won four CIK-FIA World Championships and three CIK-FIA European Championships, including Nyck de Vries's back-to-back KF1 World Championships in 2010 and 2011.

=== Zanardi Edition NSX ===
The Alex Zanardi Edition Acura NSX was introduced in 1999 for the U.S. market to commemorate Zanardi's two back-to-back CART championship wins for Honda in 1997 and 1998. The car features revised suspension, as well as a fixed roof, lightweight BBS wheels, single-pane rear glass, a lightweight rear spoiler, manual steering, and a lighter battery, making it 67.5 kg (149 lb) lighter than the targa top version. Only 51 examples were ever built, and all were painted in the newly introduced New Formula Red Color Code: R-510 which subsequently replaced Formula Red Color Code: R-77 in all markets from the year 2000 onward, to reflect the colour of the car he drove for Chip Ganassi Racing.

=== Death ===
Zanardi died aged 59 at his home in Padua on 1 May 2026. In an obituary for Formula One, the British racing journalist David Tremayne (also a friend of Zanardi), described him as "a hero of the highest calibre". Andrew Benson of BBC Sport called him "a 21st century hero. A man who inspired millions through his unquenchable spirit in the face of unbelievable adversity. An icon of two different sports." President of Italy Sergio Mattarella said he was "an athlete of outstanding qualities, he showed extraordinary character even after the very serious accident he suffered ... he has been for all these years a reference point for the entire world of sport, loved and admired also for his courage, resilience and ability to convey enthusiasm." Prime Minister Giorgia Meloni called him "a great champion and an extraordinary man, capable of turning every trial of life into a lesson in courage, strength and dignity".

Condolences were expressed by industry executives such as Formula One CEO Stefano Domenicali, FIA president Mohammed Ben Sulayem, Chip Ganassi Racing founder Chip Ganassi, Ferrari president John Elkann, Mercedes team principal Toto Wolff, Williams team principal James Vowles, and McLaren CEO Zak Brown, as well as several fellow Williams alumnus, including 1978 World Drivers' Champion Mario Andretti, 1996 World Drivers' Champion Damon Hill, Heinz-Harald Frentzen, and Carlos Sainz Jr. A moment of silence was observed at the Miami Grand Prix, in the GT World Challenge Europe, before the IMSA Monterey Sportscar Championship, and before all Italian Serie A football fixtures that weekend. Mercedes, Ferrari, and Williams ran liveries with "Ciao, Alex" (lit. 'Goodbye, Alex') emblems in Miami. Kimi Antonelli dedicated his pole position to Zanardi.

WeatherTech Raceway Laguna Seca officially designated Turns 8 and 8A, the Corkscrew, as the Zanardi Curve.

== Awards and honours ==
- Autosport Gregor Grant Award: 1998, 2003
- Laureus World Sports Award for Comeback of the Year: 2005
- Motorsports Hall of Fame of America inductee: 2013
- Gazzetta Legend Award: 2015
- Long Beach Motorsports Walk of Fame inductee: 2022

=== Orders and special awards ===
- Italy
  - Knight Grand Cross of the Order of Merit of the Italian Republic: 2014
  - Commander of the Order of Merit of the Italian Republic: 2013
  - Knight of the Order of Merit of the Italian Republic: 2003
- San Marino
  - Commander of the Order of Saint Agatha: 2019
- Italian National Olympic Committee
  - Golden Collar of Sports Merit: 2012, 2016, 2017, 2019
  - Gold Medal of Athletic Valour: 2006
  - Silver Medal of Athletic Valour: 1987, 1990
  - Bronze Medal of Athletic Valour: 1985

== Racing record ==
=== Racing career summary ===
Season	Series	Team	Races	Wins	Poles	F/Laps	Podiums	Points	Position
1988	Italian Formula Three Championship	Coperchini	9	0	0	0	0	2	16th
1989	Italian Formula Three Championship	Erre 3 Racing	11	0	2	1	2	13	7th
1989	FIA European Formula Three Cup	Erre 3 Racing	1	0	0	0	0	—N/a	7th
1989	Macau Grand Prix	Federal Express Intersport Racing	1	0	0	0	0	—N/a	DNF
1989	International Formula 3000	Automotive BVM	1	0	0	0	0	0	NC
1990	Italian Formula Three Championship	RC Motorsport	11	2	1	?	4	35	**2nd**
1990	FIA European Formula Three Cup	RC Motorsport	1	1	0	0	1	—N/a	**1st**
1990	Macau Grand Prix	RC Motorsport	1	0	0	0	0	—N/a	7th
1991	International Formula 3000	Il Barone Rampante	10	2	3	3	6	42	**2nd**
1991	Formula One	Team 7UP Jordan	3	0	0	0	0	0	NC
1992	Italian Superturismo Championship	Jolly Club	1	0	0	0	0	6	24th
1992	Formula One	Minardi Team	1	0	0	0	0	0	NC
1992	Porsche Carrera Cup Germany	Porsche AG	1	0	0	0	0	0	NC
1993	Formula One	Team Lotus	11	0	0	0	0	1	20th
1994	Formula One	Team Lotus	10	0	0	0	0	0	NC
1995	BPR Global GT Series	Lotus GT Team	2	0	0	0	0	28	63rd
1996	PPG Indy Car World Series	Target Ganassi Racing	16	3	6	6	6	132	**3rd**
1997	CART PPG World Series	Target Chip Ganassi	16	5	4	6	7	195	**1st**
1997	International Race of Champions	—N/a	4	0	3	0	0	17	12th
1998	CART FedEx Championship Series	Chip Ganassi Racing	19	7	0	5	15	285	**1st**
1999	Formula One	Winfield Williams	16	0	0	0	0	0	NC
2001	CART FedEx Championship Series	Mo Nunn Racing	15	0	0	1	0	24	23rd
2003	European Touring Car Championship	BMW Team Italy-Spain	2	0	0	0	0	—N/a	NC†
2004	European Touring Car Championship	BMW Team Italy-Spain	17	0	0	0	0	8	14th
2005	World Touring Car Championship	BMW Team Italy-Spain	17	1	0	0	2	36	10th
2005	Italian Superturismo Championship	BMW Team Italy	10	8	3	6	9	91	**1st**
2005	European Touring Car Cup	BMW Team Italy-Spain	2	1	1	0	1	12	**3rd**
2006	World Touring Car Championship	BMW Team Italy-Spain	20	1	0	1	3	26	11th
2006	Italian Superturismo Championship	BMW Team Italy-Spain	4	4	4	1	4	46	5th
2006	European Touring Car Cup	BMW Team Italy-Spain	2	0	1	0	0	5	7th
2007	World Touring Car Championship	BMW Team Italy-Spain	21	0	0	2	1	14	15th
2008	World Touring Car Championship	BMW Team Italy-Spain	24	1	1	1	3	36	13th
2009	World Touring Car Championship	BMW Team Italy-Spain	23	1	0	0	1	31	12th
2014	Blancpain GT Sprint Series	ROAL Motorsport	11	0	0	0	0	12	19th
2015	Blancpain GT Sprint Series	ROAL Motorsport	2	0	0	0	0	4	25th
2016	Italian GT Championship	BMW Team Italia	2	1	0	0	1	25	17th
2018	Deutsche Tourenwagen Masters	BMW Team RMR	2	0	0	0	0	—N/a	NC†
2019	IMSA SportsCar Championship	BMW Team RLL	1	0	0	0	0	22	24th
2019	Italian GT Championship	BMW Team Italia	1	0	0	0	0	0	NC

^{†} As Zanardi was a guest driver, he was ineligible for championship points.

=== Complete International Formula 3000 results ===
(key) (Races in bold indicate pole position; races in italics indicate fastest lap)

Year	Entrant	1	2	3	4	5	6	7	8	9	10	Pos	Points
1989	Automotive BVM	SIL	VAL	PAU	JER	PER	BRH	BIR	SPA	BUG	DIJ; 16	NC	0
1991	Il Barone Rampante	VAL; 1	**PAU**; Ret	JER; 2	**MUG**; 1	PER; Ret	HOC; Ret	**BRH**; 2	SPA; 2	BUG; Ret	NOG; 2	**2nd**	**42**

=== Complete Formula One results ===
(key) (Races in bold indicate pole position; races in italics indicate fastest lap)

Year	Entrant	Chassis	Engine	1	2	3	4	5	6	7	8	9	10	11	12	13	14	15	16	WDC	Pts
1991	Team 7UP Jordan	Jordan 191	Ford HBA4 3.5 V8	USA	BRA	SMR	MON	CAN	MEX	FRA	GBR	GER	HUN	BEL	ITA	POR	ESP; 9	JPN; Ret	AUS; 9	NC	0
1992	Minardi Team	Minardi M192	Lamborghini 3512 3.5 V12	RSA	MEX	BRA	ESP	SMR	MON	CAN	FRA	GBR; DNQ	GER; Ret	HUN; DNQ	BEL	ITA	POR	JPN	AUS	NC	0
1993	Team Lotus	Lotus 107B	Ford HBD6 3.5 V8	RSA; Ret	BRA; 6	EUR; 8	SMR; Ret	ESP; 14†	MON; 7	CAN; 11	FRA; Ret	GBR; Ret	GER; Ret	HUN; Ret	BEL; DNQ	ITA	POR	JPN	AUS	20th	1
1994	Team Lotus	Lotus 107C	Mugen Honda MF-351 HC 3.5 V10	BRA	PAC	SMR	MON	ESP; 9	CAN; 15											NC	0
1994	Team Lotus	Lotus 109	Mugen Honda MF-351 HC 3.5 V10							FRA; Ret	GBR; Ret	GER; Ret	HUN; 13	BEL	ITA; Ret	POR	EUR; 16	JPN; 13	AUS; Ret	NC	0
1999	Williams Winfield	Williams FW21	Supertec FB01 3.0 V10	AUS; Ret	BRA; Ret	SMR; 11†	MON; 8	ESP; Ret	CAN; Ret	FRA; Ret	GBR; 11	AUT; Ret	GER; Ret	HUN; Ret	BEL; 8	ITA; 7	EUR; Ret	MAL; 10	JPN; Ret	NC	0

^{†} Did not finish but was classified, as he completed more than 90% of the race distance.

=== Complete CART results ===
(key) (Races in bold indicate pole position; races in italics indicate fastest lap)

Year	Team	No.	Chassis	Engine	1	2	3	4	5	6	7	8	9	10	11	12	13	14	15	16	17	18	19	20	Rank	Points
1996	Target Ganassi Racing	4	Reynard 96i	Honda HRH	MIA; 24	**RIO**; 4	SRF; 21	LBH; 24	NAZ; 13	MCH; 17	MIL; 13	DET; 11	**POR**; 1	CLE; 2	TOR; 2	MCH; 21	**MDO**; 1	**ROA**; 3	**VAN**; 26	**LAG**; 1					**3rd**	**132**
1997	Target Chip Ganassi	4	Reynard 97i	Honda HRR	**MIA**; 7	**SRF**; 4	LBH; 1	NAZ; 11	RIO; 4	GAT; 4	MIL; 13	DET; 26	POR; 11	**CLE**; 1	TOR; 2	MCH; 1	MDO; 1	ROA; 1	**VAN**; 4	LAG; 3	FON; DNS				**1st**	**195**
1998	Chip Ganassi Racing	1	Reynard 98i	Honda HRK	MIA; 3	MOT; 23	LBH; 1	NAZ; 2	RIO; 2	GAT; 1	MIL; 8	DET; 1	POR; 1	CLE; 1	TOR; 1	MCH; 3	MDO; 12	ROA; 2	VAN; 4	LAG; 2	HOU; 2	SRF; 1	FON; 3		**1st**	**285**
2001	Mo Nunn Racing	66	Reynard 01i	Honda HR-1	MTY; 24	LBH; 26	NAZ; 20	MOT; 7	MIL; 11	DET; 24	POR; 26	CLE; 13	TOR; 4	MCH; 20	CHI; 9	MDO; 19	ROA; 13	VAN; 24	LAU; 20	ROC	HOU	LAG	SRF	FON	**23rd**	**24**

=== Complete International Race of Champions results ===
(key) (Races in bold indicate pole position; * indicates most laps led)

Year	Make	1	2	3	4	Pos	Points
1997	Pontiac	**DAY**; 10	CLT; 12	**CAL**; 12	**MCH**; 12	12th	17

=== Complete World Touring Car Championship results ===
(key) (Races in bold indicate pole position; races in italics indicate fastest lap)

Year	Entrant	Car	1	2	3	4	5	6	7	8	9	10	11	12	13	14	15	16	17	18	19	20	21	22	23	24	Pos	Points
2005	BMW Team Italy-Spain	BMW 320i	ITA; 1; 10	ITA; 2; 7	FRA; 1; 15	FRA; 2; 25	GBR; 1; 23	GBR; 2 DNS	SMR; 1; 8	SMR; 2; 6	MEX; 1; 13	MEX; 2 Ret	BEL; 1 WD	BEL; 2 WD	GER; 1; 8	GER; 2; 1	TUR; 1; 6	TUR; 2; 3	ESP; 1; 8	ESP; 2; 5	MAC; 1; 13	MAC; 2; 4					10th	36
2006	BMW Team Italy-Spain	BMW 320si	ITA; 1; 7	ITA; 2; 23	FRA; 1; 14	FRA; 2 Ret	GBR; 1; 10	GBR; 2; 9	GER; 1; 24	GER; 2; 13	BRA; 1; 10	BRA; 2; 3	MEX; 1; 17	MEX; 2 Ret	CZE; 1; 2	CZE; 2; 22	TUR; 1; 1	TUR; 2; 9	ESP; 1; 15	ESP; 2; 17	MAC; 1; 23	MAC; 2; 9					11th	26
2007	BMW Team Italy-Spain	BMW 320si	BRA; 1; 7	BRA; 2; 6	NED; 1; 12	NED; 2; 11	ESP; 1 Ret	ESP; 2 DNS	FRA; 1 Ret	FRA; 2; 9	CZE; 1; 3	CZE; 2; 20	POR; 1; 16	POR; 2; 15	SWE; 1; 20	SWE; 2; 15	GER; 1 Ret	GER; 2; 15	GBR; 1; 15	GBR; 2 Ret	ITA; 1; 13	ITA; 2; 6	MAC; 1; 10	MAC; 2 Ret			15th	14
2008	BMW Team Italy-Spain	BMW 320si	BRA; 1; 15	BRA; 2; 11	MEX; 1; 15	MEX; 2; 11	ESP; 1; 12	ESP; 2; 18	FRA; 1; 12	FRA; 2; 11	**CZE**; **1**; 1	CZE; 2; 2	POR; 1; 20	POR; 2; 13	GBR; 1; 4	GBR; 2; 3	GER; 1; 12	GER; 2; 19	EUR; 1; 12	EUR; 2; 9	ITA; 1; 8	ITA; 2; 7	JPN; 1; 13	JPN; 2 Ret	MAC; 1; 23	MAC; 2; 5	13th	36
2009	BMW Team Italy-Spain	BMW 320si	BRA; 1; 10	BRA; 2; 14	MEX; 1; 13	MEX; 2; 6	MAR; 1 Ret	MAR; 2 DNS	FRA; 1 NC	FRA; 2; 5	ESP; 1; 12	ESP; 2; 5	CZE; 1; 1	CZE; 2 Ret	POR; 1; 12	POR; 2; 10	GBR; 1; 12	GBR; 2; 12	GER; 1; 17	GER; 2 Ret	ITA; 1; 4	ITA; 2; 4	JPN; 1; 15	JPN; 2; 17	MAC; 1; 9	MAC; 2; 9	12th	31

=== Complete Blancpain Sprint Series results ===
(key) (Races in bold indicate pole position; races in italics indicate fastest lap)

Year	Entrant	Car	Class	1	2	3	4	5	6	7	8	9	10	11	12	13	14	Pos	Points
2014	ROAL Motorsport	BMW Z4 GT3	Pro	NOG; QR; 14	NOG; CR; 13	BRH; QR; 17	BRH; CR; 5	ZAN; QR	ZAN; CR	SVK; QR; 10	SVK; CR; Ret	ALG; QR; 14	ALG; CR; 9	ZOL; QR; 10	ZOL; CR; 13	BAK; QR; Ret	BAK; CR; DNS	20th	12

=== Complete Deutsche Tourenwagen Masters results ===
(key) (Races in bold indicate pole position; races in italics indicate fastest lap)

Year	Entrant	Car	1	2	3	4	5	6	7	8	9	10	11	12	13	14	15	16	17	18	19	20	Pos	Points
2018	BMW Team RMR	BMW M4 DTM	HOC; 1	HOC; 2	LAU; 1	LAU; 2	HUN; 1	HUN; 2	NOR; 1	NOR; 2	ZAN; 1	ZAN; 2	BRH; 1	BRH; 2	MIS; 1; 13	MIS; 2; 5	NÜR; 1	NÜR; 2	SPL; 1	SPL; 2	HOC; 1	HOC; 2	NC†	—

^{†} As Zanardi was a guest driver, he was ineligible for championship points.

=== Complete WeatherTech SportsCar Championship results ===
(key) (Races in bold indicate pole position; races in italics indicate fastest lap)

Year	Entrant	Class	Chassis	Engine	1	2	3	4	5	6	7	8	9	10	11	Pos	Points
2019	BMW Team RLL	GTLM	BMW M8 GTE	BMW S63 4.0 L Turbo V8	DAY; 9	SEB	LBH	MDO	WGL	MOS	LIM	ELK	VIR	LGA	PET	24th	22

== Bibliography ==
=== Autobiographies ===
- Zanardi, Alex; Gasparini, Gianluca (2004). Alex Zanardi: My Sweetest Victory. Haynes Publishing. ISBN 978-1844251087.
- Zanardi, Alex; Gasparini, Gianluca (2016). Volevo solo pedalare... ma sono inciampato in una seconda vita [I only wanted to pedal... but I stumbled into a second life] (in Italian). Rizzoli. ISBN 978-8817090339.
- Zanardi, Alex (2019). «Quel ficcanaso di Zanardi»: Storie e riflessioni di un ottimista incallito ["That busybody Zanardi": Stories and reflections of a hardened optimist] (in Italian). Rizzoli. ISBN 978-8817143165.

=== Biographies and related works ===
- Donnini, Mario (2024). Alex Zanardi: A Life in Pictures / Immagini di una vita (in Italian and English). Giorgio Nada Editore. ISBN 978-8879119283.
- Arrigoni, Claudio (2021). Alex Zanardi: Ancora [Alex Zanardi: Again] (in Italian). Baldini+Castoldi. ISBN 978-8893883733.
- Olvey, Stephen (2006). Rapid Response: My Inside Story As a Motor Racing Life-saver. Haynes Publishing. ISBN 978-1844253395. – Contains a detailed medical perspective on Zanardi's 2001 crash and rescue.

Sporting positions
Preceded by Gianni Morbidelli	FIA European Formula Three Cup winner 1990	Succeeded by Benoît Tréluyer (1999)
Preceded by Jimmy Vasser	CART Series; Champion; 1997–1998	Succeeded by Juan Pablo Montoya
Preceded by Adriano de Micheli	Italian Touring Car; Champion; 2005	Succeeded by Roberto Colciago
Awards and achievements
Preceded by Gil de Ferran	CART Rookie of the Year; 1996	Succeeded by Patrick Carpentier
Preceded by Armin Zöggeler	Italian Sportsman of the Year; 2012	Succeeded by Vincenzo Nibali
