= Cycling at the 2016 Summer Paralympics – Women's road time trial C4 =

Cycling, Women's road time trial C4 at the XV Paralympic Games
- Venue: Flamengo Park
- Dates: 14 September
- Competitors: 9

Medalists
1st place, gold medalist(s)		Shawn Morelli	United States
2nd place, silver medalist(s)		Megan Fisher	United States
3rd place, bronze medalist(s)		Susan Powell	Australia

The Women's road time trial C4 road cycling event at the 2016 Summer Paralympics took place on the afternoon of 14 September at Flamengo Park, Pontal. 9 riders competed over two laps of a fifteen kilometre course.

The C4 category is for cyclists with moderate upper limb impairment.

== Results ==
Women's road time trial C4. 14 September 2016, Rio.

Rank	Rider	Nationality	Time	Deficit	Avg. Speed (km/h)
1st place, gold medalist(s)	Shawn Morelli	United States	29:45.40	0	40.327
2nd place, silver medalist(s)	Megan Fisher	United States	30:15.72	30.32	39.654
3rd place, bronze medalist(s)	Susan Powell	Australia	30:19.29	33.89	39.576
4	Alexandra Lisney	Australia	30:28.39	42.99	39.379
5	Marie-Claude Molnar	Canada	30:54.75	01:09.35	38.819
6	Jenny Narcisi	Italy	32:19.73	02:34.33	37.119
7	Ruan Jianping	China	32:46.66	03:01.26	36.61
8	Katherine Horan	New Zealand	33:32.37	03:46.97	35.779
9	Katell Alençon	France	34:15.88	04:30.48	35.021
