= Lee Do-yeon =

South Korean para-athlete (born 1972)

Personal information
- Nationality: South Korean
- Born: 9 January 1972 (age 54) South Korea

Sport
- Sport: Para-cycling; Paralympic biathlon; Paralympic cross-country skiing
- Disability class: H4
Medal record
Women's Para-cycling
Representing South Korea
Summer Paralympics
Silver medal – second place	2016 Rio de Janeiro	Road race T1–4
Road World Championships
Gold medal – first place	2014 Greenville	Road time trial H4
Silver medal – second place	2019 Emmen	Road time trial H4
Silver medal – second place	2023 Glasgow	Road time trial H4
Silver medal – second place	2023 Glasgow	Road race H4
Bronze medal – third place	2014 Greenville	Road race H4
Bronze medal – third place	2019 Emmen	Road race H4
Asian Para Games
Gold medal – first place	2018 Jakarta	Time trial H4
Gold medal – first place	2018 Jakarta	Road race H4
Gold medal – first place	2022 Hangzhou	Time trial H4
Bronze medal – third place	2022 Hangzhou	Road race H4

Lee Do-yeon (born 9 January 1972) is a South Korean cyclist, biathlete and cross-country skier. As a cyclist she competed in the 2016, 2020, and 2024 Summer Paralympics, winning a bronze medal in the 2016 edition. As a biathlete and cross-country skier, she competed in the 2018 Winter Paralympics.

== Background ==
At the age of 19, Lee was paralyzed when she fell from a building. Starting her sporting career in 2007, she initially played table tennis before switching to athletics in 2012, and the following year, she began cycling.

== Sporting career ==
Lee won her first medal in Road World Championships in 2014 when she won the gold medal in the time trial and the bronze medal in the road race. She then competed in the 2016 Summer Paralympics, winning a silver medal in the road race H1–4 event.

At the 2018 Winter Paralympics, Lee competes in three biathlon events and four cross-country skiing events. Returning to cycling, she competed in the 2018 Asian Para Games winning both H2–4 events.

At the 2019 Para-cycling Road World Championships in Emmen, Lee won the silver medal in the time trial and won the bronze medal in the road race. At the 2023 Para-cycling Road World Championships, she won the silver medal in both H4 events. At the 2022 Asian Para Games, she won the gold medal in the time trial and the bronze medal in the road race.

== Personal life ==
Lee is the mother of three daughters.
