= Veselka Pevec =

Slovenian Paralympic sport shooter

Sport
- Country: Slovenia
- Sport: Paralympic shooting
- Disability: Paraplegia
- Disability class: SH2
Medal record
Paralympic Games
Gold medal – first place	2016 Rio de Janeiro	Mixed 10 m air rifle standing SH2

Veselka Pevec is a Slovenian Paralympic sport shooter. She represented Slovenia at the 2016 Summer Paralympics and she won the gold medal in the mixed 10 metre air rifle standing SH2 event.

At age 18 she was shot six times by her boyfriend and she became paraplegic as a result.
