= H5 (classification) =

Para-cycling classification

H5 is a para-cycling classification. The UCI recommends this be coded as MH5 or WH5.

== Definition ==
UCI defines H5 as: "An athlete who can use the kneeling position must use it and therefore will be classified accordingly.

- Paraplegic with impairments corresponding to a complete lesion from Th11 or below
- Double below or Double through knee amputee
- Single leg amputation (AK), minimal disability below knee amputation (BK)
- Incomplete loss of lower limb function, with other disabilities, which prevent the safe use of a conventional bicycle or tricycle
- Kneeling Position (HK-bike), in case of mobility reduction that prevents kneeling, the athlete can use a recumbent bike in H4 (ex-H3)
- Hemiplegic with spasticity grade 2, lower limb more involved
- Diplegic, lower spasticity grade 2 in both legs
- Mild to moderate athetosis or ataxia

== The cycle ==
This classification can use an ATP3 knee-seat cycle that is forward leaning on a rigid frame.

== Classification history ==
Cycling first became a Paralympic sport at the 1988 Summer Paralympics. In September 2006, governance for para-cycling passed from the International Paralympic Committee's International Cycling Committee to UCI at a meeting in Switzerland. When this happened, the responsibility of classifying the sport also changed.

For the 2016 Summer Paralympics in Rio, the International Paralympic Committee had a zero classification at the Games policy. This policy was put into place in 2014, with the goal of avoiding last minute changes in classes that would negatively impact athlete training preparations. All competitors needed to be internationally classified with their classification status confirmed prior to the Games, with exceptions to this policy being dealt with on a case-by-case basis.

== Competitors ==
Competitors in this classification include Stuart Tripp of Australia and Alex Zanardi of Italy.

== Rankings ==
This classification has UCI rankings for elite competitors.

== Events ==
Events for this classification at the include the men's Individual H5 Road Race, Men's Individual H5 Time Trial, women's Individual H5 Road Race, and Women's Individual H5 Time Trial.

== Becoming classified ==
Classification is handled by Union Cycliste Internationale. Classification for the UCI Para-Cycling World Championships is completed by at least two classification panels. Members of the classification panel must not have a relationship with the cyclist and must not be involved in the World Championships in any other role than as classifier. In national competitions, the classification is handled by the national cycling federation. Classification often has three components: physical, technical and observation assessment.

== See also ==
- Para-cycling classification
- Cycling at the Summer Paralympics
