= Wim Decleir =

Belgian wheelchair athlete

Personal information
- Nationality: Belgian
- Born: 5 March 1971 (age 55)

Sport
- Sport: Para-cycling
Medal record
Representing Belgium
Men's para-cycling
Paralympic Games
Bronze medal – third place	2012 London	Road race H4
Road world championships
Silver medal – second place	2011 Roskilde	Road race (H4)
Bronze medal – third place	2010 Baie-Comeau	Road race (H4)
Bronze medal – third place	2010 Baie-Comeau	Time trial (H4)

Wim Decleir (born 5 March 1971) is a Paralympian sportsman from Belgium. He competed in para-cycling.

== Personal history ==
Decleir was born in Belgium in 1971. He was a promising football player for former Belgian first division club, K.R.C. Harelbeke. After a motorcycle accident in 1989, his left leg was amputated in 1995. Soon after Decleir started powerlifting and in 2000 he switched to handcycling.

Decleir is married with two children and is a bank manager. In 2012, he made the national news headlines when his mistress was murdered by her husband.

== Sporting career ==
Decleir competed in the H4 men's road race and time trial at the 2012 Summer Paralympics in London finishing 4th in the time trial and winning a bronze in the road race. German athlete Norbert Mosandl, 2nd in the time trial, was banned one year later for two years after a positive doping test for EPO.

He won two bronze medals at the UCI Para-cycling Road World Championships in 2010 in Baie-Comeau, Canada and a silver in the Road Race H4 at the 2011 World Championships in Roskilde, Denmark.

He won the Berlin Marathon in 2005, 2006 and 2007 and the Hamburg Marathon in 2006 and 2008.

== Awards ==
- Belgian Paralympic Athlete of the Year (2011) after finishing year ranked world number 1 for Road Race
- Trophy Victor Boin (2017)
