= Oz Sanchez =

American handcyclist and triathlete

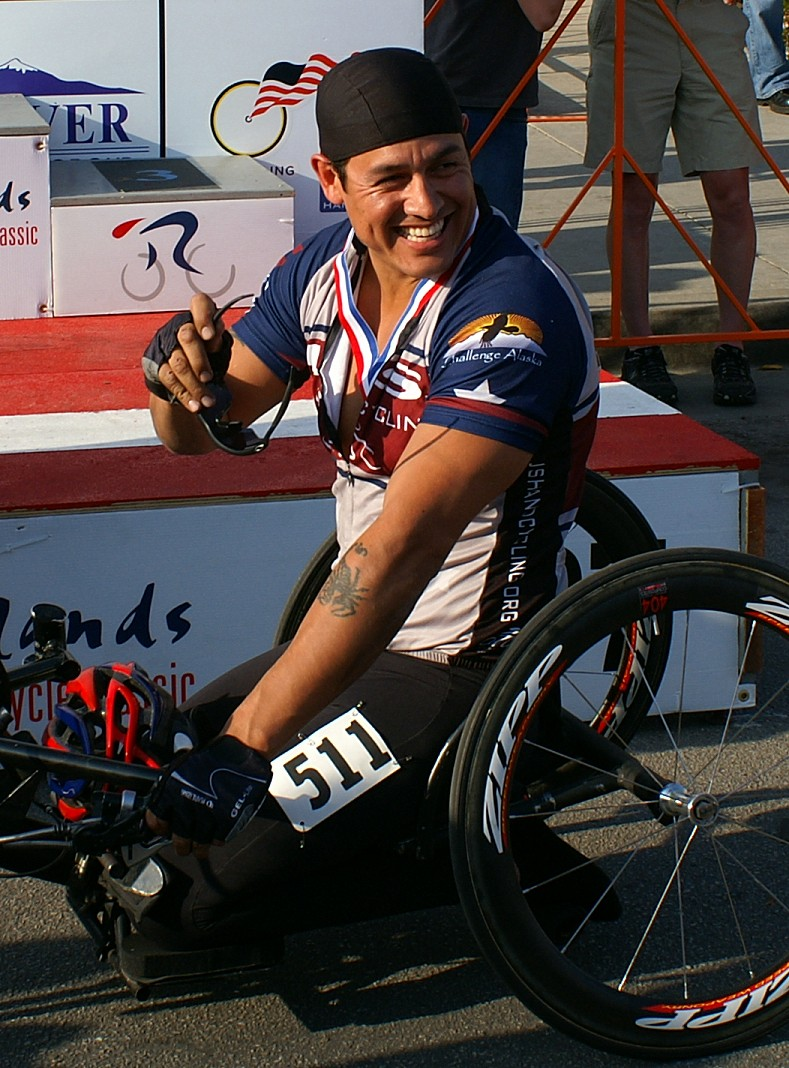
- Sanchez in 2007

Personal information
- Full name: Oscar Sanchez
- Nationality: American
- Born: December 2, 1975 (age 50) Los Angeles, California, U.S.
- Education: B.S. in Business Management and M.S. in Marriage and Family Therapy from San Diego State University
- Occupation: Former US Marine Corps Special Forces. Motivational speaker.
- Years active: 2006–
- Website: www.knownolimits.com

Sport
- Sport: Cycling, triathlon
- Disability: Paraplegia
- Disability class: H5 (cycling)
Medal record
Men's road bicycle racing
Representing United States
Paralympic Games
Gold medal – first place	2008 Beijing	time trial (HC C)
Bronze medal – third place	2008 Beijing	Road race (HC C)
Gold medal – first place	2012 London	Mixed team relay
Bronze medal – third place	2012 London	Road time trial (H4)
Silver medal – second place	2016 Rio de Janeiro	Mixed team relay
Bronze medal – third place	2016 Rio de Janeiro	Road time trial (H5)
Parapan American Games
Gold medal – first place	2011 Guadalajara	Mixed time trial (H1-4)
Gold medal – first place	2011 Guadalajara	Road race (H2-4)

Oscar "Oz" Sanchez (born December 2, 1975) is an American Paralympic handcyclist and triathlete. A former Marine, he has a spinal cord injury following a motorcycle accident in 2001. He started handcycling competitively in 2006, and competes in the H5 classification. At the 2011 Parapan American Games, Sanchez won a gold in the road race and time trial for his classification. He won medals at the 2008, 2012 Paralympic Games and 2016 Paralympic Games. Sanchez was also a medallist at the UCI Para-cycling Road World Championships in 2009, 2010 and 2011.

His story is featured in the 2009 documentary Unbeaten, directed by Steven C. Barber. He is of Mexican American descent.

== Medals at the Paralympic Games ==
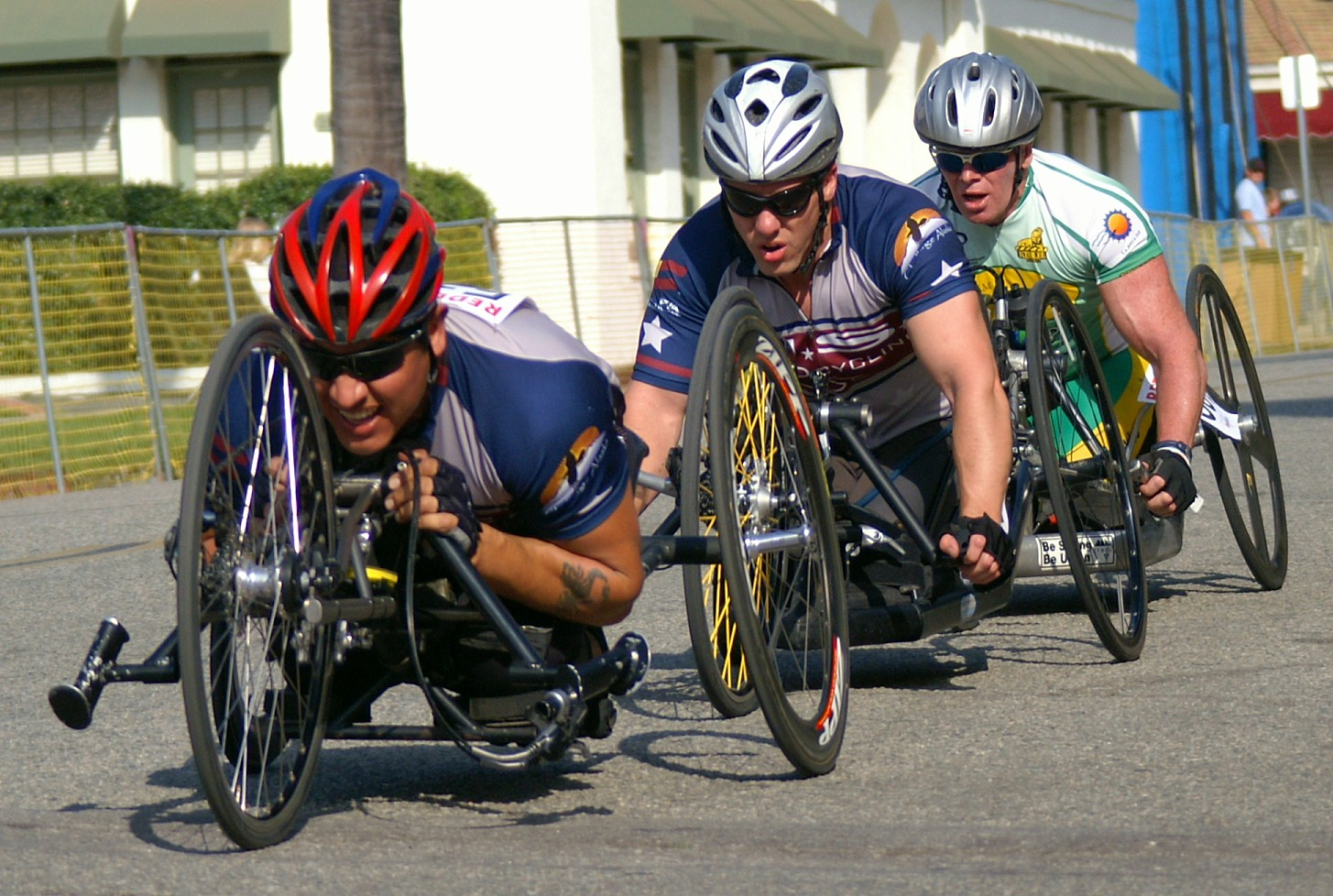
Oz Sanchez, Seth Arseneau and Todd Philpott race at the Redlands Bike Classic, 2007

=== 2016 ===
- - Cycling - mixed team relay
- - Cycling - time trial

=== 2012 ===
- - Cycling - team relay
- - Cycling - time trial

=== 2008 ===
- - Cycling - time trial
- - Cycling - road race
