= Stuart Tripp =

Australian cyclist

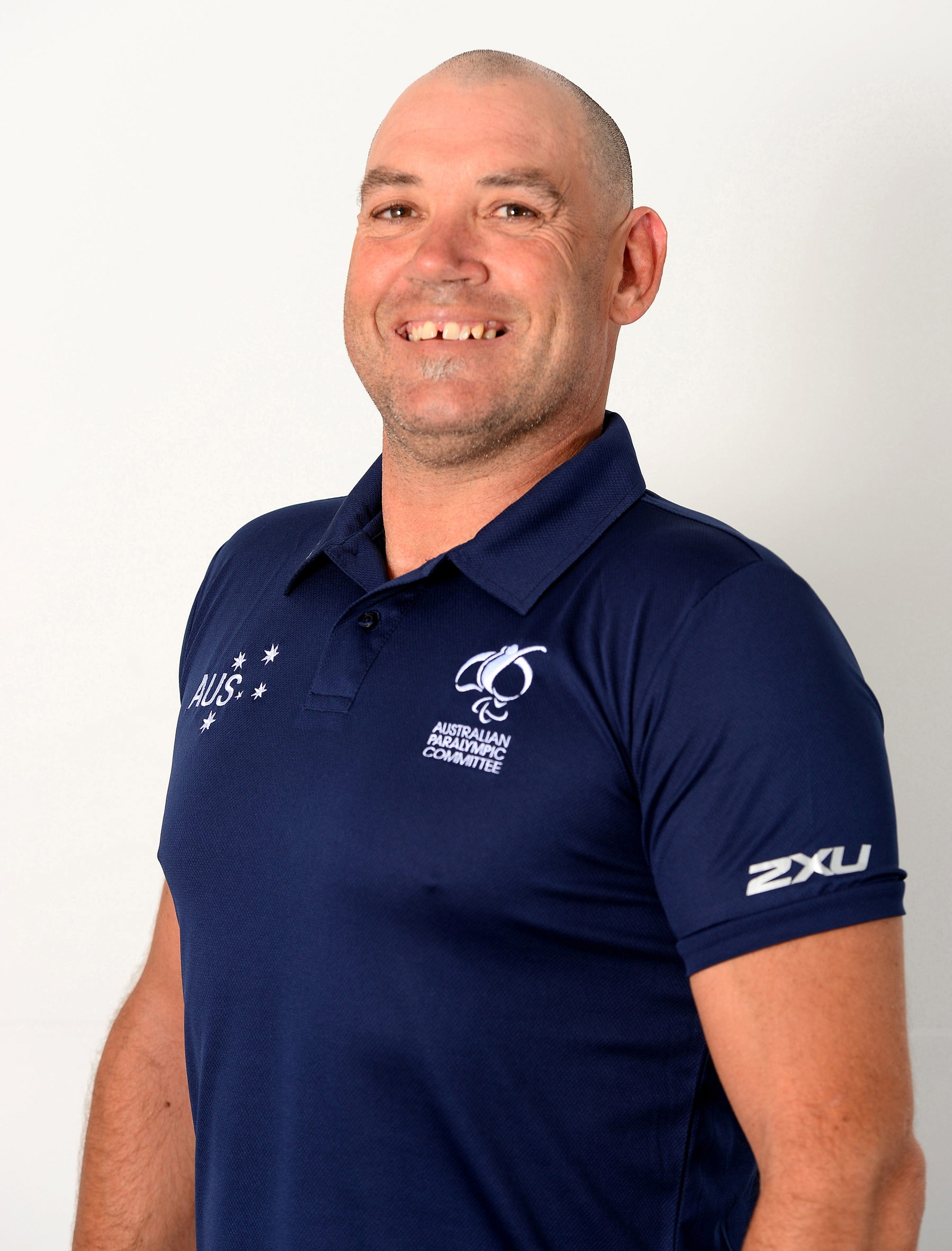
- 2016 Australian Paralympic team portrait of Tripp

Personal information
- Nationality: Australian
- Born: 13 June 1970 (age 56) Traralgon, Victoria

Sport
- Country: Australia
- Sport: Cycling
- Disability class: H5
- Events: Road Race; Road Time Trial
- Club: St Kilda Cycling Club
Medal record
Men's road bicycle racing
Representing Australia
Paralympic Games
Silver medal – second place	2016 Rio de Janeiro	Men's Time Trial H5

Stuart Tripp (born 13 June 1970) is an Australian cyclist. He won a silver medal in the Men's Road Time Trial H5 at the 2016 Rio Paralympics and competed at the 2020 Tokyo Paralympics.

== Personal ==
Tripp was born on 13 June 1970 in Traralgon, Victoria. His right leg was amputated following a 1994 car accident that had left him in a coma for several weeks after the initial accident. The accident happened when he was 23 years old and also resulted in both his legs being broken. Neither drugs nor alcohol were causes and his seatbelt helped save his life. Following his accident, he turned to alcohol and smoking cigarettes as a form of coping but he eventually stopped using both.

Tripp is a qualified plumber and has degrees in science and adult learning and development. He is also an accomplished author, with an autobiography titled 'Travelling Hopefully' published in 2007.

Tripp has competed in the New York City Marathon in the handcycle class. As of 2021, he lives in Northcote, Victoria. He is a husband and father and when not training or spending time with his kids he also visits schools where he acts as a motivational speaker for youngsters.

== Cycling ==
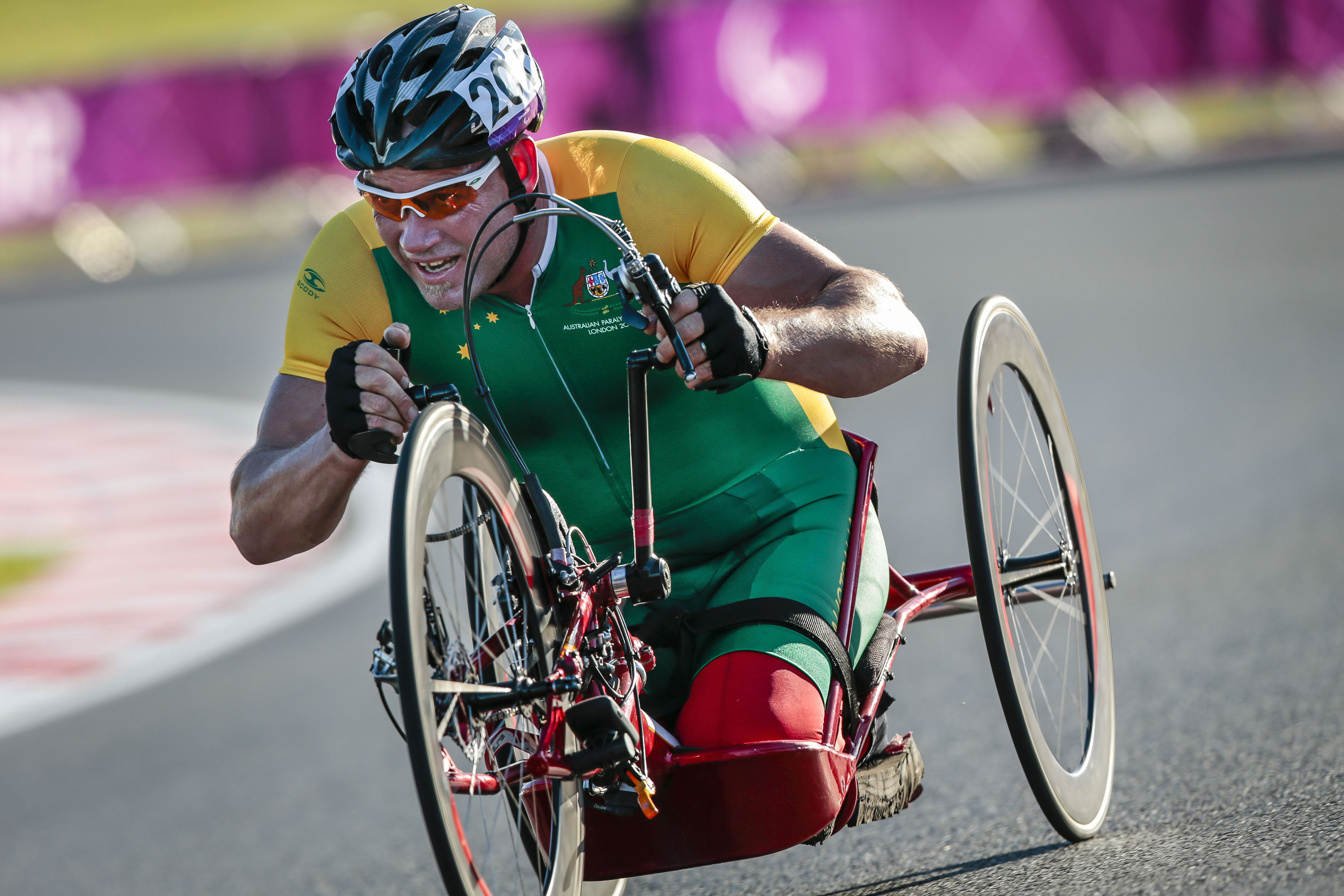
Tripp at the 2012 London Paralympics

Tripp is an H5 classified cyclist. He uses a hand cycle, and believes cycling helped save his life following his accident, taking up the sport on the recommendation of psychologist at a time when he was smoking two packs of cigarettes a day.

Tripp participated in the Victorian event in the 2012 Australian National Handcycle Series. With a time of 21:04, he finished first in the H4 event. Stuart Tripp, Alex Welsh, and Kiwi Tiffiney Perry competed together as a team in a relay race at an Australian cycling event. At the 2012 London Paralympics he had two top ten placings.

At the 2014 UCI Para-cycling Road Championships in Greenville, North Carolina, he finished fifth in the Men's Time Trial H5 and sixth in the Men's Road Race M5. Tripp won a silver medal in Men's Time Trial H5 at the 2014 UCI World Cup held in - Cantimpalos, Spain. In 2015 Tripp broke his arm during a riding accident and that prevented him from participating in the 2015 World Championships in Notwill, Switzerland and a World Cup event in Germany. This had serious potential consequences for a position in the 2016 Australian Paralympic Cycling Team.

At the 2016 Rio Paralympics, he won the silver medal in the Men's Road Time Trial H5. He also finished seventh in the Men's Road Race H5.

In 2016, he was a Victorian Institute of Sport scholarship holder and was awarded their Sarah Tait Spirit Award with diver Anabelle Smith.

At the 2017 UCI Para-cycling Road World Championships, Pietermaritzburg, south Africa, he finished fourth in the Men's Time Trial H5.

At the 2019 UCI Para-cycling Road World Championships, Emmen, Netherlands, he finished fifth in Men's Time Trial H5 and Men's Road Race H5.

At the 2020 Tokyo Paralympics, Tripp finished eighth in the Men's Road Time Trial H5 and seventh in the Men's Road Race H5.

Tripp finished ninth in the Men's Time Trial H5 and eighth in the Men's Road Race H5 at the 2022 UCI Para-cycling Road World Championships in Baie-Comeau.
