= Australian Paralympic Shooting Team =

Shooting has been included in the Summer Paralympic Games from the 1976 Games. Australia has been represented at each Games since 1976.

Notable Australian athletes:

- Elizabeth Kosmala, a wheelchair athlete, has won 12 shooting medals (9 gold and 3 silver medals). Kosmala has been selected in the team for London Games. It will be her 11th consecutive Games.
- Barbara Caspers has won 7 medals (5 gold, 1 silver and 1 bronze medals)

== Medal table ==
Games	Gold	Silver	Bronze	Total
1976 Toronto	1	0	0	1
1980 Arnhem	2	3	1	6
1984 Stoke Mandeville	9	0	0	9
1988 Seoul	3	1	0	4
1992 Barcelona	0	0	0	0
1996 Atlanta	0	1	0	1
2000 Sydney*	0	1	0	1
2004 Athens	0	1	1	2
2008 Beijing	0	0	0	0
2012 London	0	0	1	1
2016 Rio	0	0	0	0
2020 Tokyo	0	0	0	0
2024 Paris	0	0	0	0
Totals (13 entries)	15	7	3	25

== Summer Paralympic Games ==
=== 1976 ===
Australia represented by:
Men – Kevin Bawden, J. Handbridge
Women – Elizabeth Richards
Australia won 1 gold medal through Elizabeth Richard's performance in Mixed rifle shooting 2–5.

=== 1980 ===
Australia represented by:
Men – Peter Pascoe
Women – Barbara Caspers, Elizabeth Kosmala
Australia won 6 medals - 2 gold medals, 3 silver medals and 1 bronze medal

=== 1984 ===
Australia represented by:
Men – Troy Andrews, Kevin Bawden, Keith Bremner, Allan Chadwick, Peter Parker, Andrew Rainbow, Stanley Sims, Grant Walker
Women – Barbara Caspers, Elizabeth Kosmala
Australian team won 9 gold medals - Barbara Caspers and Elizabeth Kosmala both won 4 gold medals and Allan Chadwick one gold medal.

=== 1988 Seoul ===
Australia represented by:
Men – Robert Bakker, Keith Bremner, Allan Chadwick, Andrew Rainbow, Stanley Simms, Grant Walker
Women – Barbara Caspers, Elizabeth Kosmala
Elizabeth Kosmala won all Australia's shooting medals - 3 gold medals and one silver medal.

=== 1992 Barcelona ===
Australia represented by:
Men – Keith Bremner, Andrew Rambow
Women – Elizabeth Kosmala

=== 1996 Atlanta ===
Australia represented by:
Men – Ashley Adams, Keith Bremner, Iain Fischer, James Nomarhas, Peter Worsley
Women – Patricia Fischer, Libby Kosmala
Coach – Yvonne Hill (Head), Raymund Brummell

=== 2000 Sydney ===
Australia represented in shooting by:
Men – Ashley Adams, Stephen Guy, Stan Kosmala, Jeff Lane, James Nomarhas, Paul Schofield, Peter Shannon, Peter Tait, Peter Worsley
Women – Elizabeth Kosmala
Coaches – Yvonne Hill (Head), Anne Bugden, Evangelos Anagnostou
Officials – Andre Jurich

Australia won a silver medal with Peter Tait's performance in the pistol. Six shooters made finals.

=== 2004 Athens ===
Australia represented in shooting:
Men - Ashley Adams, James Nomarhas, Peter Worsley, David Ziebarth Women – Elizabeth Kosmala
Coaches - Miroslav Sipek (Head), Hans Heiderman
Officials - Michelle Fletcher (Manager), Craig Jarvis, Elizabeth Ziebarth
Australia won 1 silver and 1 bronze medal through Ashley Adams' performances.

Detailed Australian Results

=== 2008 Beijing ===
Representing Australia in shooting:
Men - Ashley Adams, Sebastian Hume, Jason Maroney
Women - Libby Kosmala
Coaches - Miro Sipek (Head Coach), Michelle Fletcher
Officials - Nick Sullivan (Section Manager), Anne Bugden

Australia did not win a medal.

Detailed Australian Results

=== 2012 London ===
Representing Australia in shooting:
Men - Ashley Adams, Luke Cain, Jason Maroney, Bradley Mark
Women - Libby Kosmala, Natalie Smith
Coach - Miro Sipek
Officials – Section Manager – Nick Sullivan, Technical Support – Stuart Smith, Personal Care Attendant – Anne Bugden, Yvonne Cain, Margaret Zubcic
Libby Kosmala competed at her 11th Paralympic Games at the age of 70. Ashley Adams competed at his 4th Games. Natalie Smith won a bronze medal.

Detailed Australian Results

=== 2016 Rio ===
Representing Australia in shooting:

Representing Australia in shooting:
Men - Luke Cain, Bradley Mark, Chris Pitt (d), Anton Zappelli (d)
Women - Libby Kosmala, Natalie Smith
'Coach - Head Coach - Miro Sipek, Assistant Coach - Margaret Bugden,
Officials - Team Leader - Tim Mahon, Carers - Yvonne Cain, Stuart Smith, Margaret Zubcic
Australia did not win any medals. Australia's best placing was Christopher Pitt's fourth.

Detailed Australian Results

=== 2020 Tokyo ===
Representing Australia in shooting:
Men - Chris Pitt, Anton Zappelli
Women - Natalie Smith
Officials - Team Leader - Kurt Olsen, Technical Support - Catherine Berry
Australia did not win any medals.

Detailed Australian Results

=== 2024 Paris ===
Representing Australia in shooting:
Men - Anton Zappelli
Women - Natalie Smith
Officials - Team manager - Catherine Berry, Physiotherapist - Ben Frick
Australia did not win any medals.

Detailed Australian Results

(d) Paralympic Games debut

.

== See also ==
- List of Australian Paralympic shooting medalists
- Shooting at the Summer Paralympics
- Australia at the Paralympics
