= List of Australian Paralympic shooting medalists =

Shooting first entered the Summer Paralympic Games in 1976. Australia has competed at every Paralympic shooting competition.

== Medalists ==
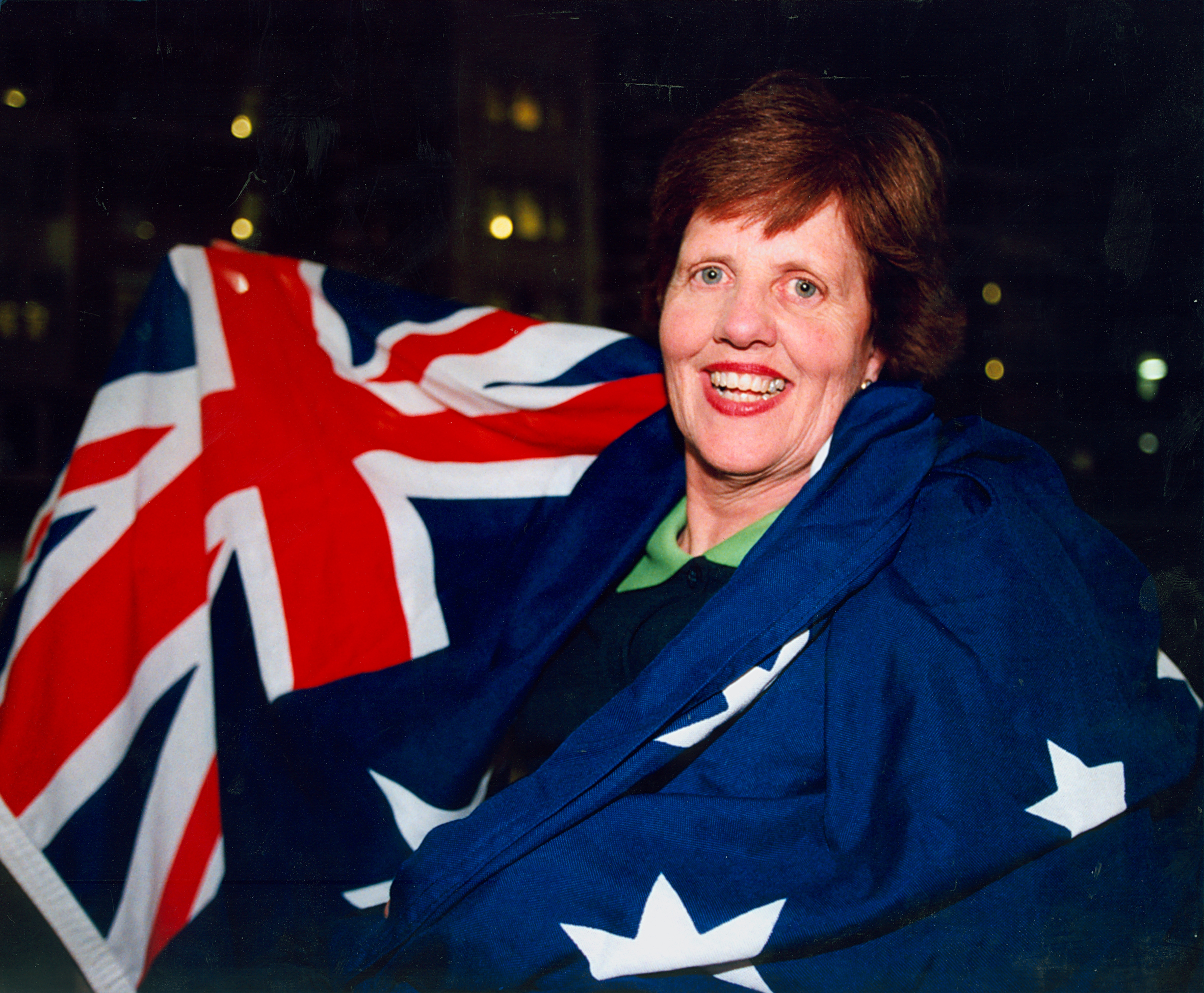
Shooter Elizabeth Kosmala at the 1996 Atlanta Paralympic Games

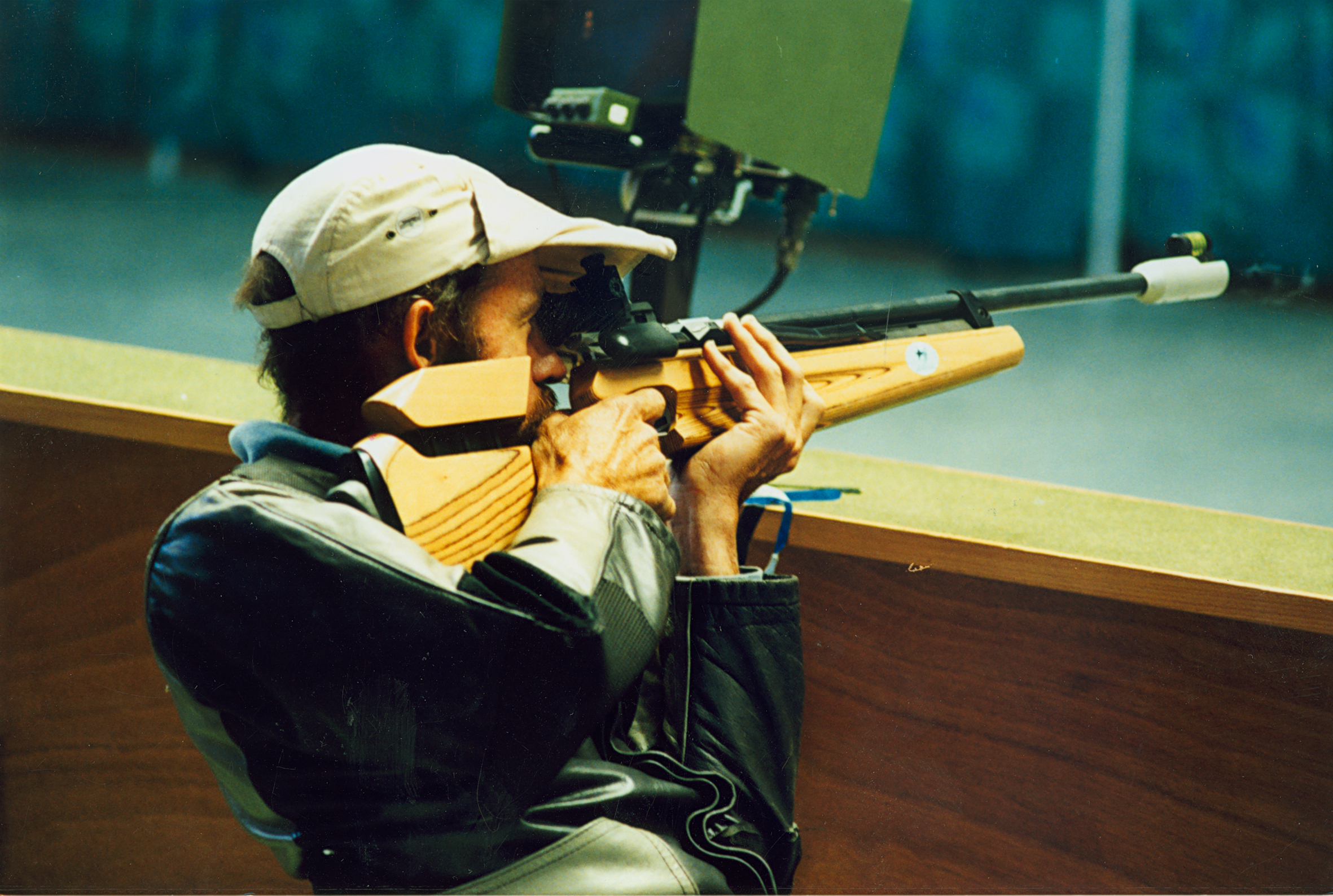
Ashley Adams shooting at the 1996 Atlanta Paralympic Games

As of the 2012 Games.

Athlete	Gold	Silver	Bronze	Total
Allan Chadwick	1	0	0	1
Ashley Adams	0	1	1	2
Barbara Caspers	5	1	1	7
Elizabeth Kosmala	9	3	0	12
James Nomarhas	0	1	0	1
Natalie Smith	0	0	1	1
Peter Tait	0	1	0	0

== Summer Paralympics ==
=== 1976 ===
Australia won 1 gold medal.

Medal	Name	Event
Gold	Elizabeth Richards	Mixed rifle shooting 2–5

=== 1980 ===
Australia won 2 gold medals, 3 silver medals and 1 bronze medal.

Medal	Name	Event
Gold	Barbara Caspers	Mixed air rifle kneeling 1A-1C
Gold	Elizabeth Kosmala	Mixed air rifle prone 2–5
Silver	Barbara Caspers	Mixed air rifle 3 positions 1A-1C
Silver	Elizabeth Kosmala	Mixed air rifle 3 positions 2–5
Silver	Elizabeth Kosmala	Mixed air rifle kneeling 2–5
Bronze	Barbara Caspers	Mixed air rifle standing 1A-1C

=== 1984 ===
Australia won 9 gold medals.

Medal	Name	Event
Gold	Allan Chadwick	Men's Rifle prone – tetraplegic (aids) 1A-1C
Gold	Libby Kosmala	Women's Air rifle 3 positions 2–6
Gold	Libby Kosmala	Women's Air rifle kneeling 2–6
Gold	Libby Kosmala	Women's Air rifle prone 2–6
Gold	Libby Kosmala	Women's Air rifle standing 2–6
Gold	Barbara Caspers	Women'sAir rifle kneeling 1A-1C
Gold	Barbara Caspers	Women's Air rifle prone 1A-1C
Gold	Barbara Caspers	Women's Air rifle standing 1A-1C
Gold	Barbara Caspers	Mixed Air rifle 3 positions 1A-1C

=== 1988 ===
Australia won 3 gold medals and 1 silver medal.

Medal	Name	Event
Gold	Elizabeth Kosmala	Women's Air rifle 3 positions 2–6
Gold	Elizabeth Kosmala	Women's Air rifle kneeling 2–6
Gold	Elizabeth Kosmala	Women's Air rifle prone 2–6
Silver	Elizabeth Kosmala	Women's Air rifle standing 2–6

=== 1992 ===
No Medals

=== 1996 ===
Australia won 1 silver medal.

Medal	Name	Event
Silver	James Nomarhas	Mixed sport pistol SH1

=== 2000 ===
Australia won 1 silver medal.

Medal	Name	Event
Silver	Peter Tait	Mixed sport pistol SH1

=== 2004 ===
Australia won 1 silver medal and 1 bronze medal.

Medal	Name	Event
Silver	Ashley Adams	Mixed free rifle prone SH1
Bronze	Ashley Adams	Men's air rifle standing SH1

=== 2008 ===
No medals.

=== 2012 ===
Australia won 1 bronze medal.

Medal	Name	Event
Bronze	Natalie Smith	Women's 10 metre air rifle standing SH1

== See also ==
- Australian Paralympic Shooting Team
