= Miro Sipek =

Australian shooting coach (born 1948)

Miroslav Šipek
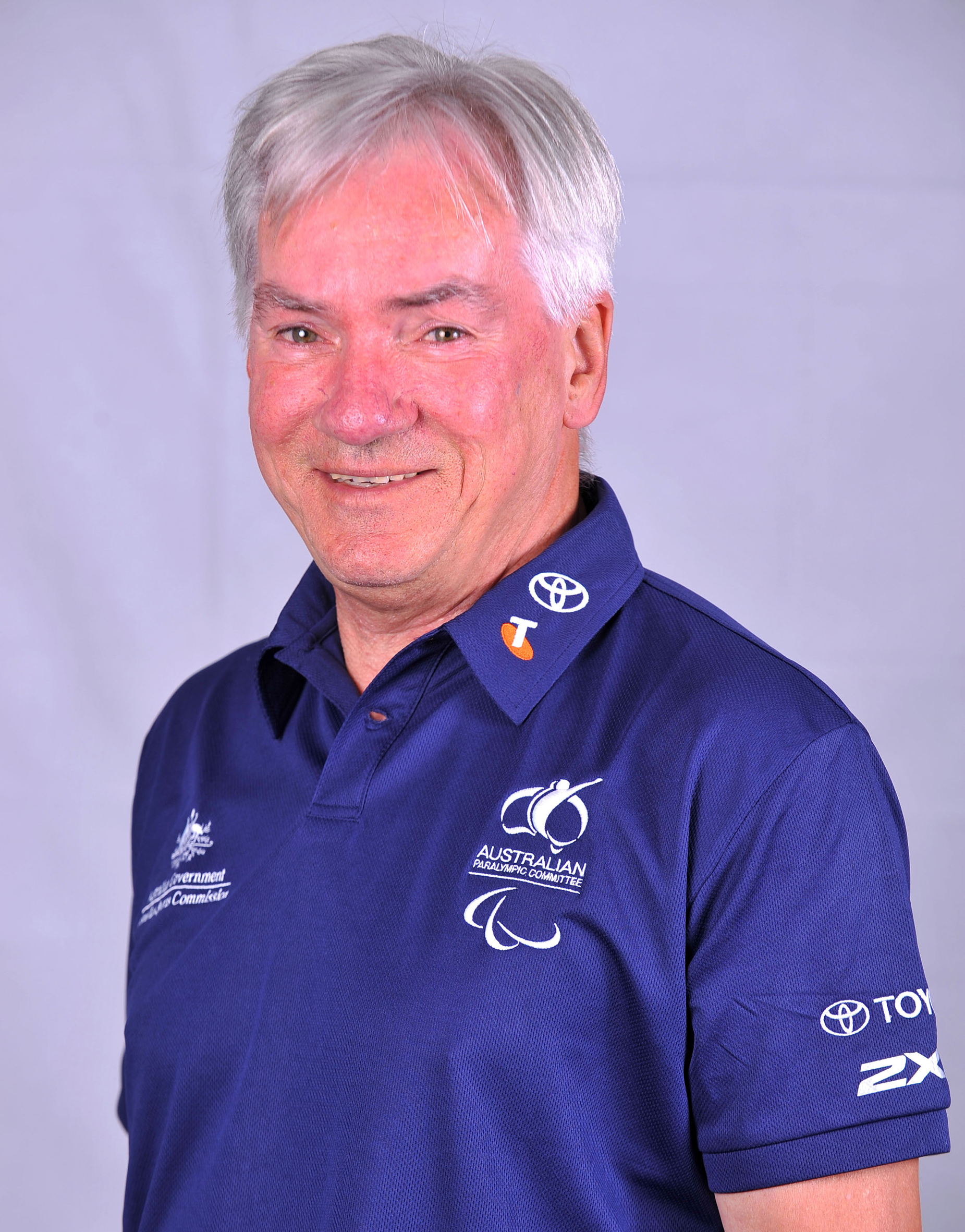
- 2012 team portrait of Miro Sipek

Personal information
- Full name: Miroslav Šipek
- Nickname: Miro
- Nationality: Australian
- Born: 6 April 1948 (age 78) Sarajevo, Bosnia and Herzegovina, former Yugoslavia
- Height: 176 cm (69 in) (1976)
- Weight: 67 kg (148 lb) (1976)

Sport
- Country: Australia
- Sport: Shooting
- Retired: 1985
- Now coaching: 1997-2009, Australian National Team; 2001-2019, Australian Paralympic National Team

Achievements and titles
- Olympic finals: 1976 Montreal
- World finals: Bronze, 1970 Phoenix Arizona
- Regional finals: 4 Silver medals at European Championships; Multiple medals at other International competitions including 16 Gold at Balkan Championships
- National finals: 27 times Yugoslav Champion (19 senior and 8 as a Junior)
Medal record
Men's shooting
Representing Yugoslavia
World Championships
Bronze medal – third place	1970 Phoenix Arizona (USA)	50m rifle prone
European Championships
Silver medal – second place	1968 Wiesbaden (Germany)	50m prone
Silver medal – second place	1968 Wiesbaden (Germany)	50m prone - team
Silver medal – second place	1969 Plzen (Czechoslovakia)	3 position 3x20
Silver medal – second place	1975 Bucharest (Romania)	kneeling 50m
Balkan Championships
Gold medal – first place	16 x Gold	Rifle
Representing Australia
Olympics, World Championships, World Cup, Commonwealth Games
Gold medal – first place	13 x Gold	Coach
Silver medal – second place	6 x Silver	Coach
Bronze medal – third place	11 x Bronze	Coach
Paralympics, IPC World Championships, IPC World Cup
Gold medal – first place	26 x Gold	Coach
Silver medal – second place	33 x Silver	Coach
Bronze medal – third place	24 x Bronze	Coach

Miroslav "Miro" Šipek (born 6 April 1948) is an Australian rifle shooting coach. During his long and successful shooting career he was a champion of Yugoslavia 27 times in a range of disciplines (19 times as a senior and 8 as a junior National Team member). He won several medals at various international competitions and Balkans Championships, 4 silver medals at European Championships and a bronze at the 1970 World Championships in Phoenix Arizona.

Miro represented Yugoslavia at the 1976 Summer Olympics in rifle shooting. In 1992, he led the first Bosnia-Herzegovina National Team from his war torn country to the 1992 Summer Olympics. Miro was the coach for Australia's shooters at 2000 Summer Olympics, 2004 Summer Olympics and 2008 Summer Olympics. He was the coach for Australia's Paralympic shooters at the Athens 2004, Beijing 2008, London 2012 and Rio 2016.

== Personal ==
Born on 6 April 1948 in Sarajevo, Bosnia and Herzegovina (former Yugoslavia) where he attended Primary School, High School and University for Physical Education.

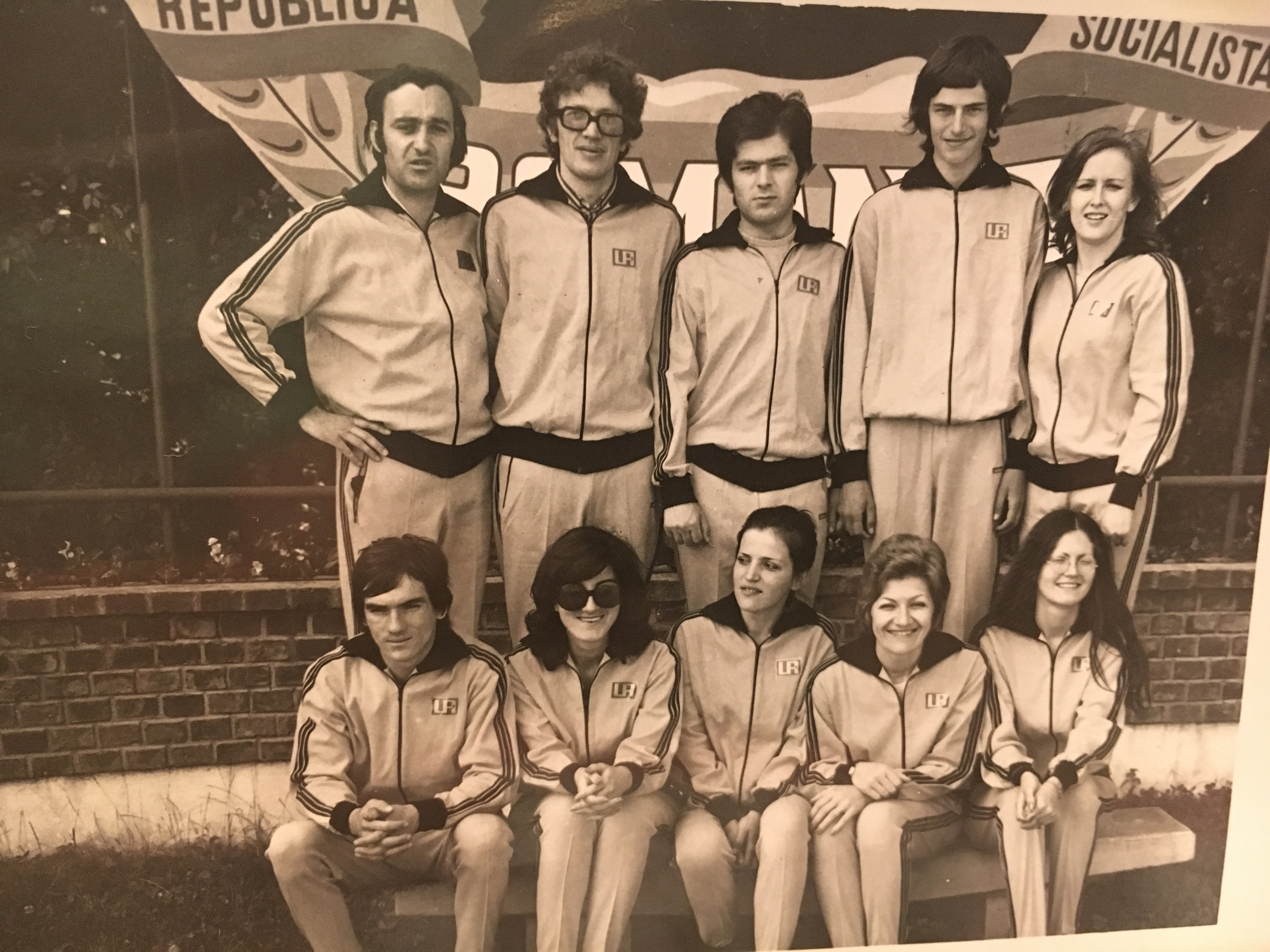
BiH Shooting team in Bucharest 1973. (Miroslav Sipek - bottom left; Mirsada Cengic (now Sipek) - top right)

In 1973 he married Mirsada Čengić, club teammate and member of the Bosnian-Herzegovinian shooting team. Together they've had two children (Goran and Mirela) and four grandchildren (Denis, Dino, Aron and Liam).

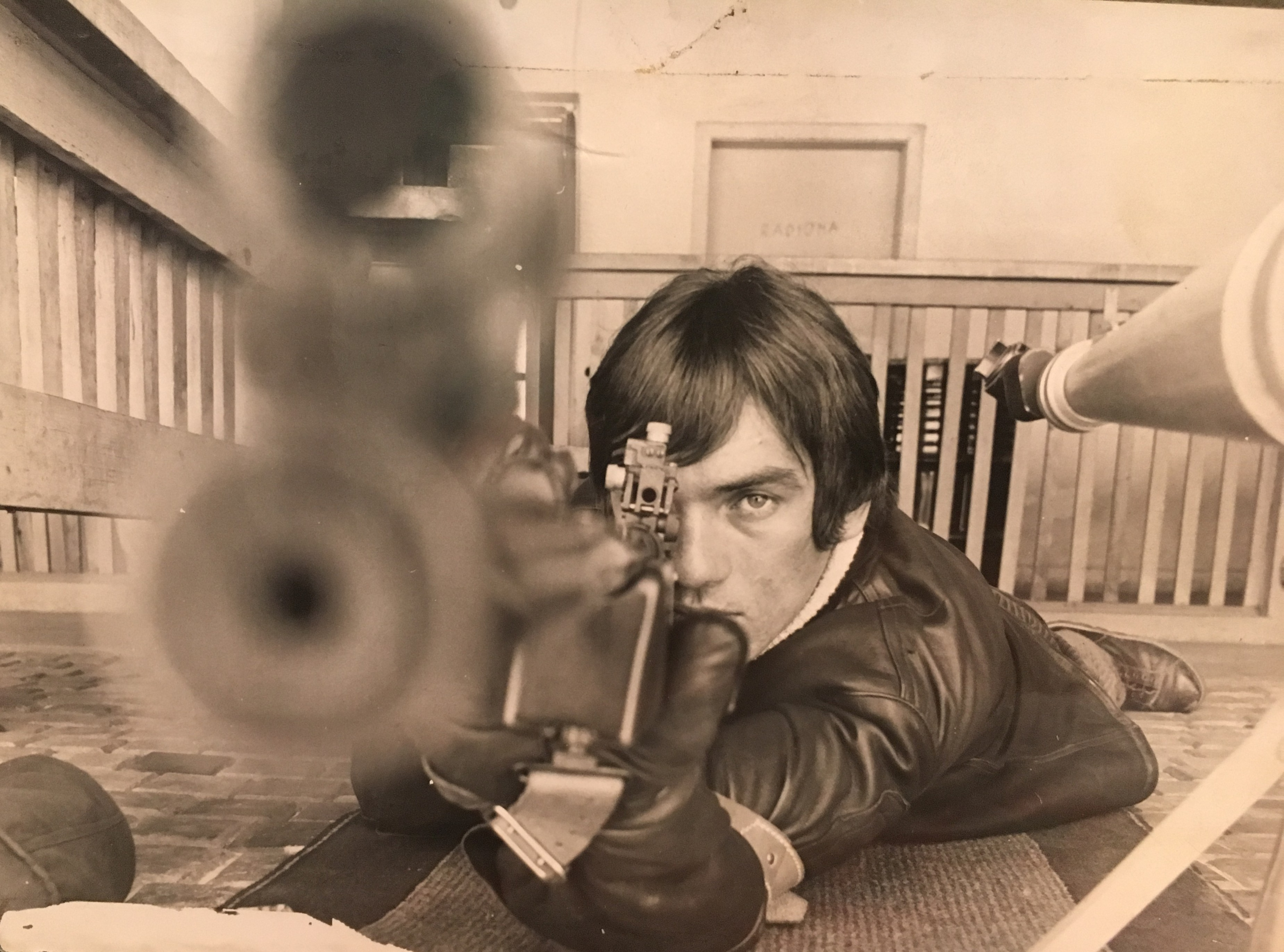
Miroslav Sipek - shooting 50m prone 1969

He started playing sport at a young age and was a talented footballer and table tennis player. His shooting career started in 1965 when he joined ‘Mico Sokolovic’ Shooting Club in his home town of Sarajevo. Very next year, he became member of the most successful Yugoslav club 'Mile Vujocic Uco - Sarajevo'. He represented Yugoslavia as part of the Junior National Team 15 times, his first appearance being in Bucharest in 1965.

During his long and successful shooting career he was a champion of Yugoslavia 27 times in a range disciplines (19 times as a senior and 8 as a junior National Team member). He won number of medals at various international competitions and Balkans Championships, 4 silver medals at European Championships and a bronze at the World Championships in Phoenix Arizona. He represented Yugoslavia at the 1976 Summer Olympics.

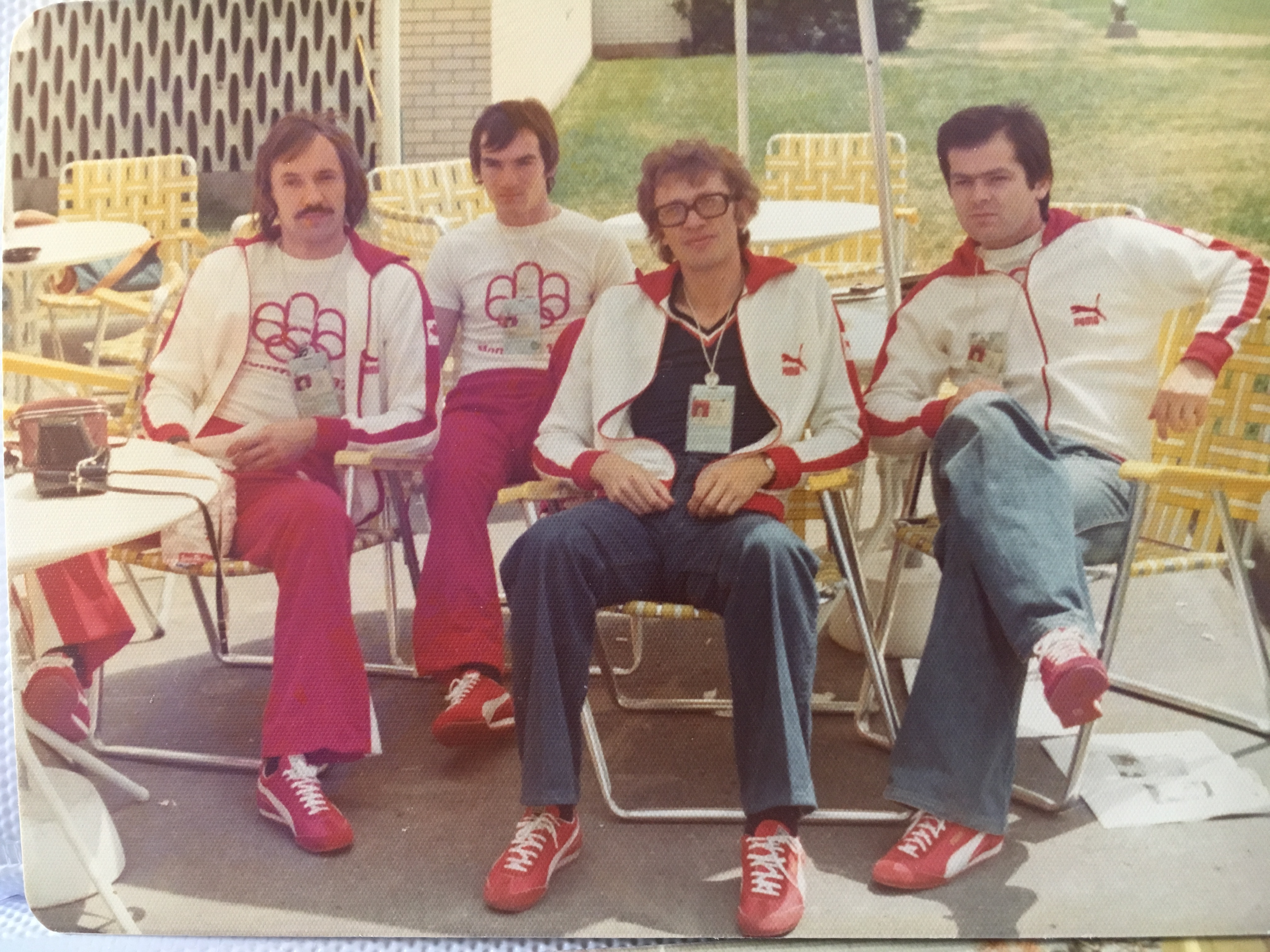
Yugoslav Shooting Team - Montreal 1976

In 1969, he was honoured as the Athlete of the Year of Bosnia and Herzegovina. He was a recipient of various regional and national honours and awards in ex-Yugoslavia, including the 'Silver Rays' ("Orden Zasluga Za Narod sa Srebrnim Zracima") which is the highest civilian decoration awarded by the late Yugoslav president Josip Broz Tito.

In 1985, after more than 250 appearances for Yugoslav Team in competitions and championships all over the world, he retired from competing and continued his shooting career as a Coach and National Selector. In 1986, Miro led Yugoslav Shooting Team to World Championships Title (prone women) in Suhl, Germany. He worked as a High Performance Manager at the Bosnian-Herzegovinian Institute of Sport. In 1992 he led the first Bosnian-Herzegovinian National Team from his war torn country to the 1992 Summer Olympics.

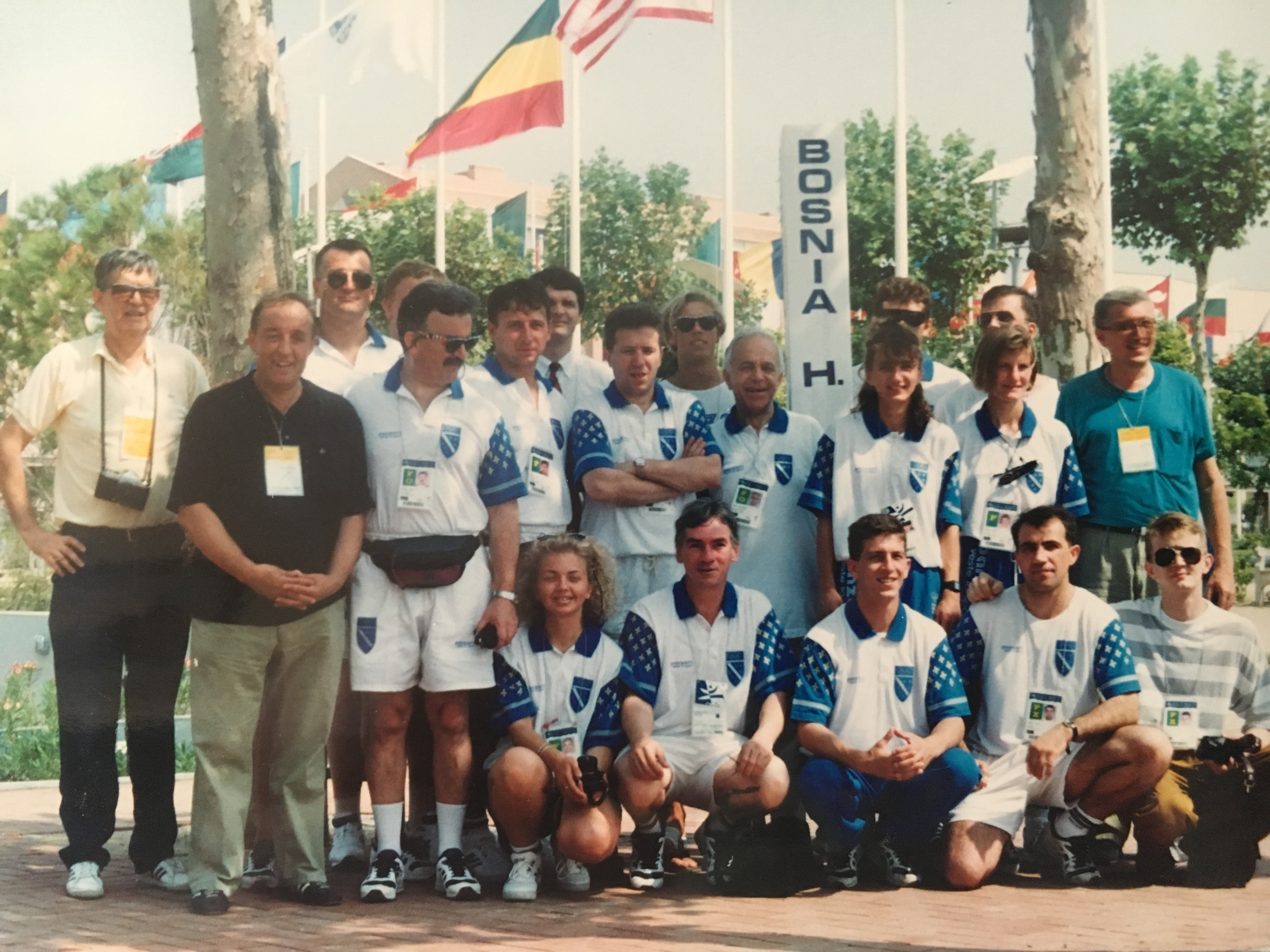
Olympic Team of Bosnia and Herzegovina at their first Olympics in Barcelona 1992 (Miro 4th bottom right).

His career continues in Australia where he moved with his family in 1995. He worked with the National Olympic Shooting Team of Australia from 1997 and took the team to the Olympics in 2000 Summer Olympics, 2004 Summer Olympics and 2008 Summer Olympics, as well as the Commonwealth Games in Manchester 2002 and Melbourne 2006. In 2009 he started working with the Australian Paralympic Shooting Team, whom he has been coaching until his retirement in January 2019.

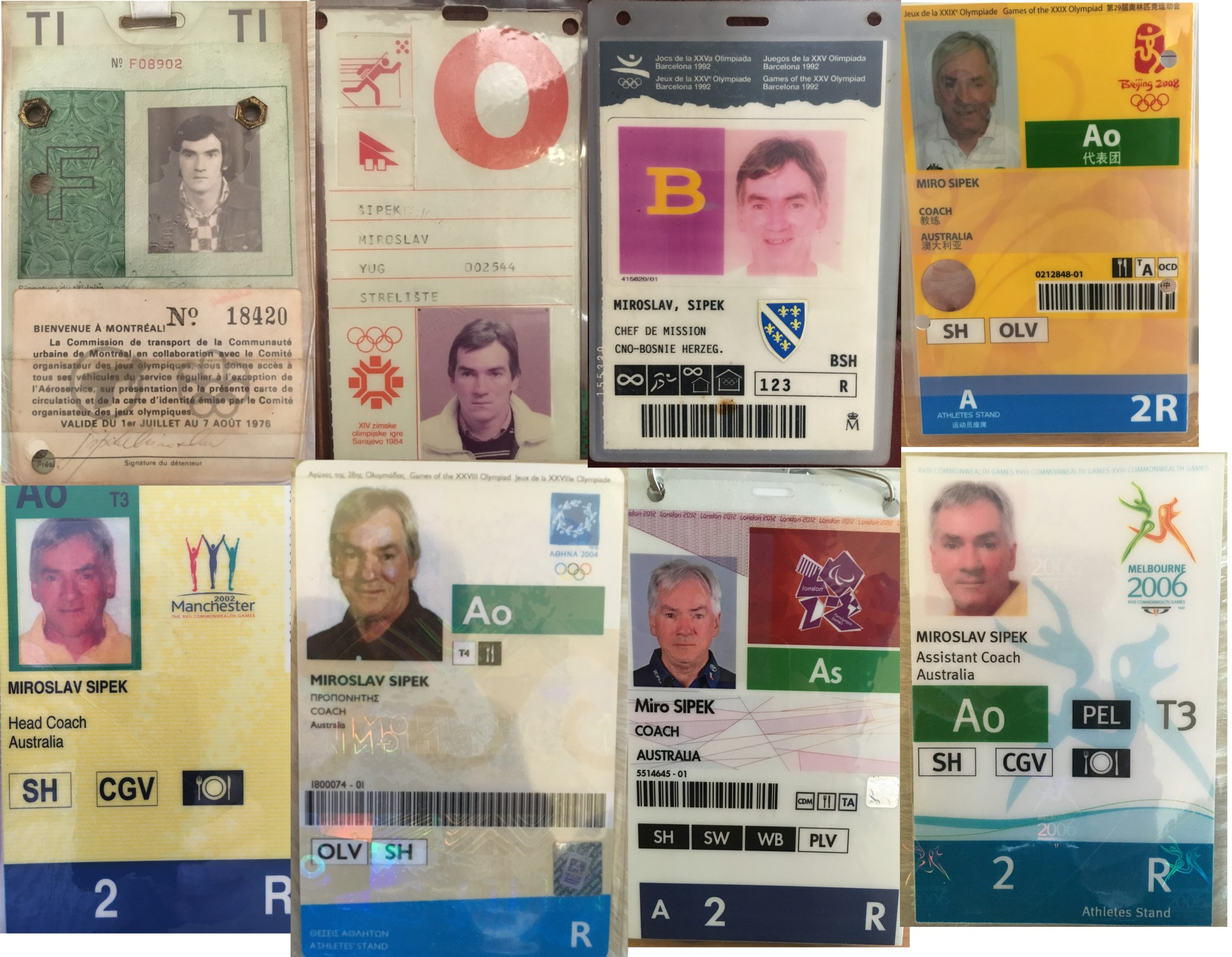
Athlete YUG (Montreal 1976), Organiser YUG (Sarajevo 1984), Chef De Mission BiH (Barcelona 1992), Coach AUS (Beijing 2008), Coach AUS (Manchester 2002), Coach AUS (Athens 2004), Coach AUS (London 2012), Coach Melbourne (2006)

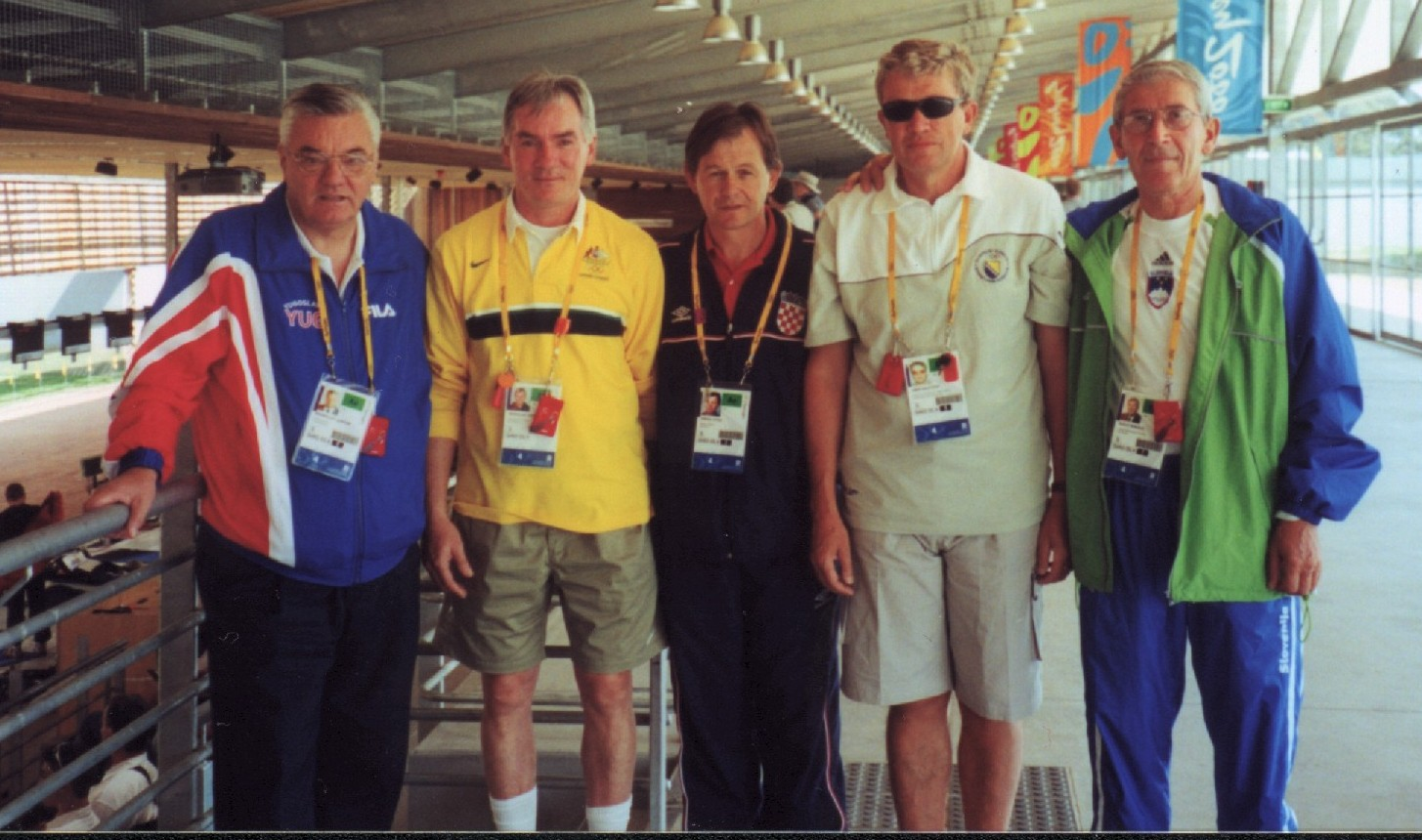
ex-Yugoslav shooting coaches at Sydney Olympics: Loncar (SRB), Sipek (AUS), Vitez (CRO), Dautovic (BiH), Mikolic (SLO)

== Shooting ==
=== Sporting achievements ===
- April 1966 broke the Yugoslav national record, 3-positions 3x20 (562)
- April 1966 chosen for the junior National Team of Yugoslavia
- September 1966 debuted with the senior National Team of Yugoslavia
- October 1966 First senior gold medal at the Balkan Championship 3x20 (571) (total of 16 gold medals at Balkan Championships throughout career)
- 1968 Silver medal at the Junior European Championships in Wiesbaden (Germany)
- 1969 Silver medal in team 3-positions discipline 3x20 at the European Championships in Plzen (Czechoslovakia)
- 1969 named as the athlete of the year of Bosnia and Herzegovina
- 1970 recipient of the Plaque of the City of Sarajevo
- 1970 Team bronze medal at the World Championships in Phoenix Arizona (60 Prone)
- 1975 placed 5th, 3-positions, at the World Championships in Thun (Switzerland)
- 1975 awarded 'Silver Rays' Decoration by the late Yugoslav president Josip Broz Tito
- 1975 Silver medal at the European Championships in Bucharest (Romania)
- 1976 competed at the 1976 Summer Olympics where he represented Yugoslavia in the Three Position, Prone 50 meter events
- 1966-1985 Several Sport Honours – Yugoslavia
- 1981 Youth Day (May 25) Award
- Awarded the title of the Meritorious Athlete of Yugoslavia
- 1989 ISSF (UIT) Gold Medal Honour
- 1988-1992 President of National Shooting Association B&H
- 1992-1996 Member of Executive Committee – Olympic Committee B&H
- 1992 Led the first B&H National Team to the 1992 Summer Olympics
- 1995 first non German to win Gau-Schützenkönig (Shooting King) in Ruhpolding, Germany

=== Coaching ===
Miro Sipek is a rifle shooting coach. He led Yugoslav Shooting Team to World Championships Title (prone women) in 1986, Suhl (Germany).

From 1997 Miro has been coaching Australian Shooting Team(s). Shooters he has coached include Warren Potent, Ashley Adams, Libby Kosmala, Jason Maroney, Tim Lowndes, Sue McCready, Belinda Imgrund (Muhlberg), Carrie Quigley, Sam and Rob Wieland, Nat Smith, Luke Cain, Anton Zappelli, Bradley Mark... He started coaching Ben Burge in 2003.

Miro was the coach for Australia's shooters at the Summer Olympic Games in:

- 2000
- 2004
- 2008.

He coached Australia's Paralympic shooters at the Paralympics in:

- Athens 2004
- Beijing 2008 and Paralympics.
- London 2012
- Rio 2016.

Miro was also shooting coach for Commonwealth Games in:

- Manchester 2002
- Melbourne 2006

=== Retirement ===
After a 54-year career in shooting, first as an athlete and then as a coach, Miro finally retired for the sport in January 2019.

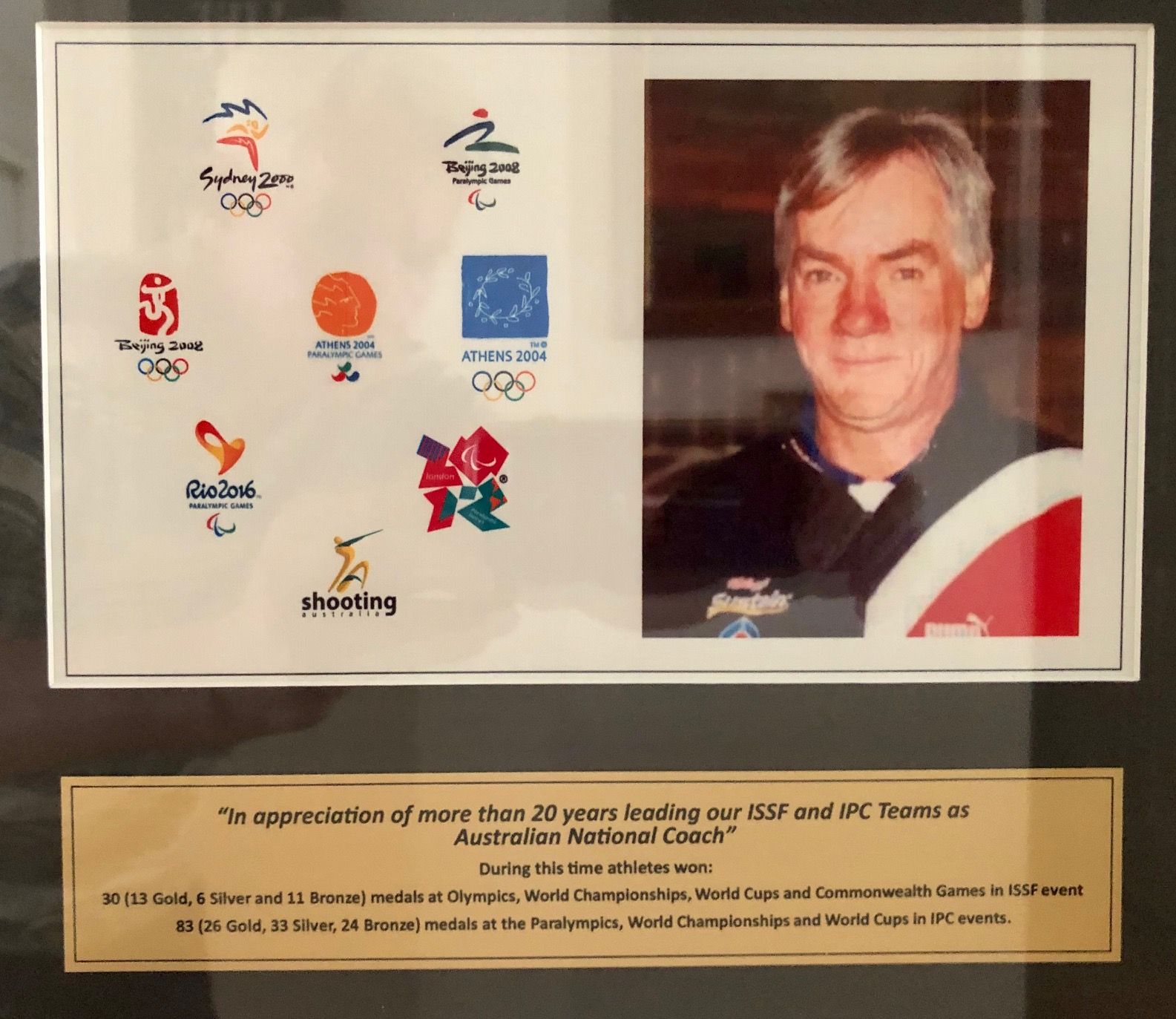
Appreciation Plaque from Shooting Australia for achievements as Australian National Coach.

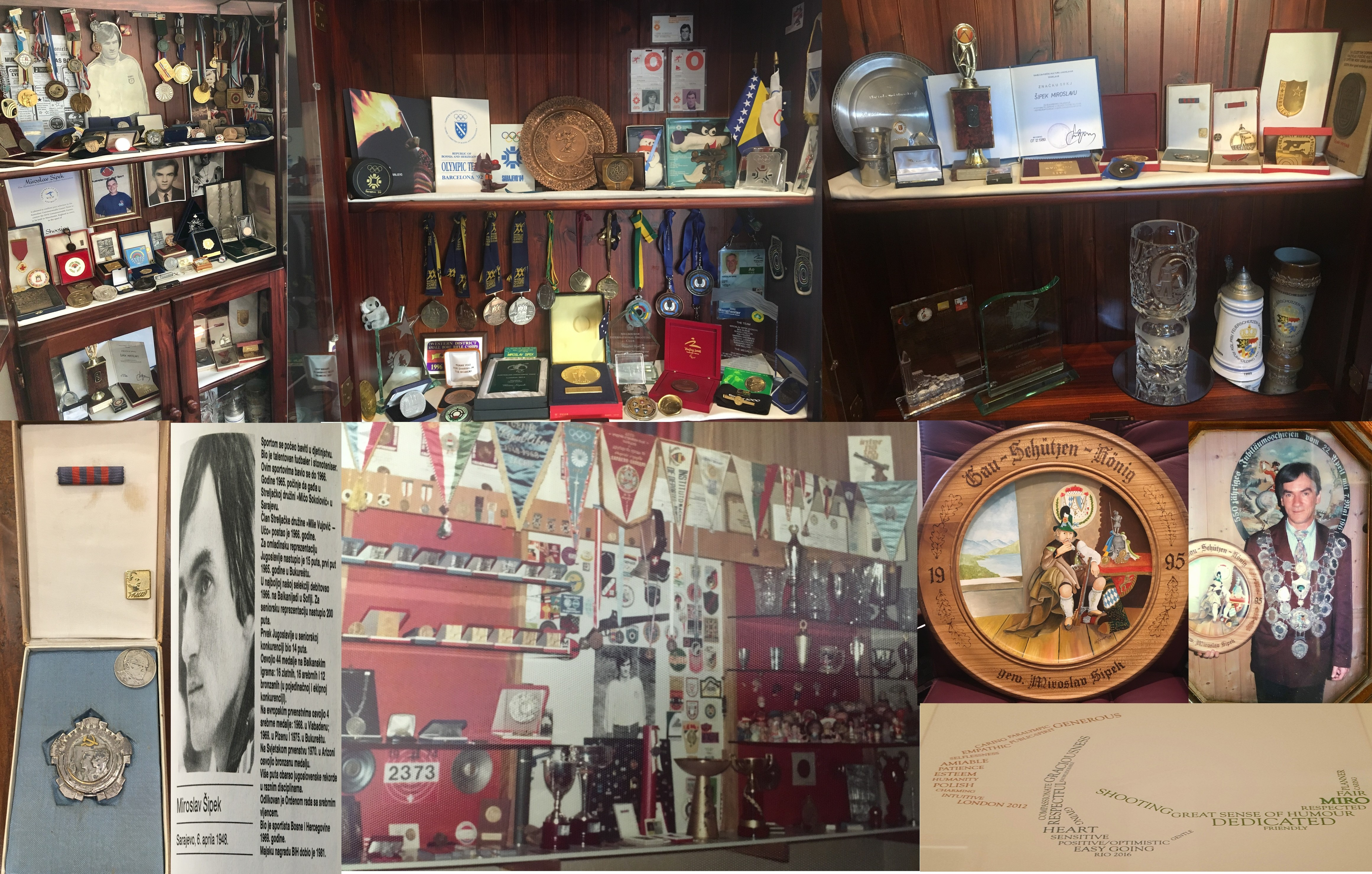
Some of Miro's medals and trophies
