= Šipek =

Šipek may refer to:

- Šipek, Črnomelj, a village in Slovenia
- Šipek, Croatian surname
  - Miro Šipek (born 1948), Croatian-Australian rifle shooting coach
  - Stjepan Šipek (1942–2019), Croatian-American actor
