= Luke Cain =

Australian male shooter Paralympian (born 1980)

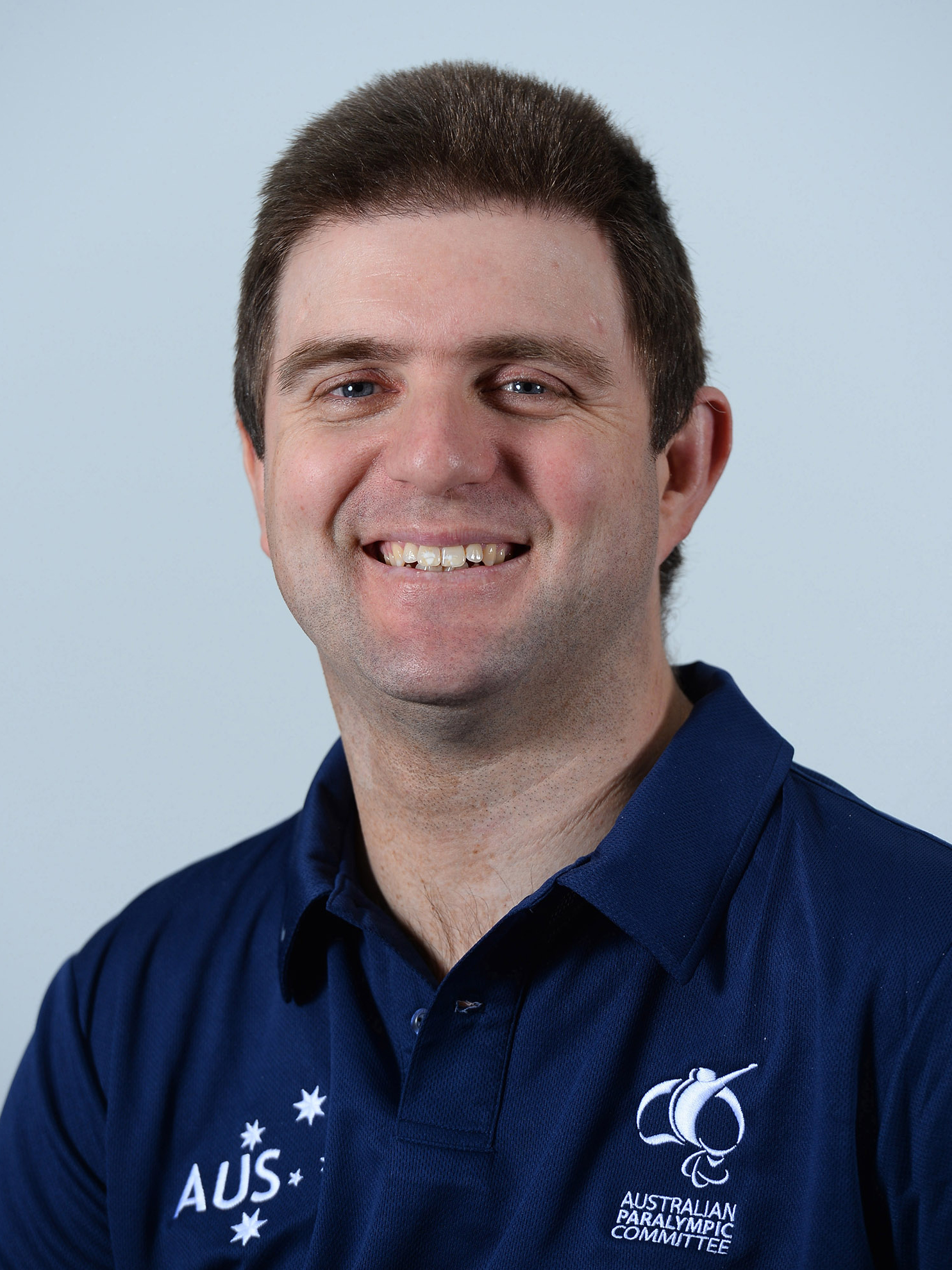
- 2016 Australian Paralympic team portrait

Personal information
- Nationality: Australian
- Born: 3 February 1980 (age 46)

Sport
- Country: Australia
- Sport: Shooting
- Events: 10m air rifle prone 10m air rifle standing
- Club: Springvale Range Club

Luke Cain (born 3 February 1980) is an SH2-classified Australian shooter who became a paraplegic after an accident while playing Australian rules football. He started competing in 2007, as the sport suited his disability, and has been a Victorian Institute of Sport scholarship holder since 2008. He first represented Australia internationally in 2009 at a World Cup event in South Korea. He has also represented Australia in two Paralympic Games including the 2016 Rio Paralympics.

== Personal ==
Cain was born on 3 February 1980 in Rosebud, Victoria. He started playing Australian rules football when he was seven years old for the Rye Football Club. He played senior football for Rosebud Football Club as a full-forward. In August 1999, at the age of nineteen, he was playing for Rosebud in a game against Hastings Football Club when he broke his neck after being sandwiched between a teammate and an opposing player. He is a paraplegic, and requires use of a wheelchair because of paralysis that affects him from the chest down. He has limited use of his fingers and no use of his hands. Before his accident, he participated in a range of sports, including basketball, athletics, waterskiing, kneeboarding and wakeboarding. After his accident, he continued in some sports, including angling. As of 2012, he resides in Boneo, Victoria.

His cousin is Travis Cloke, an AFL All-Australian full-forward. Cain has been an inspiration to his cousin on the football field. At the same time, Cloke has supported Cain. Other cousins include AFL players Jason Cloke and Cameron Cloke.

== Shooting ==
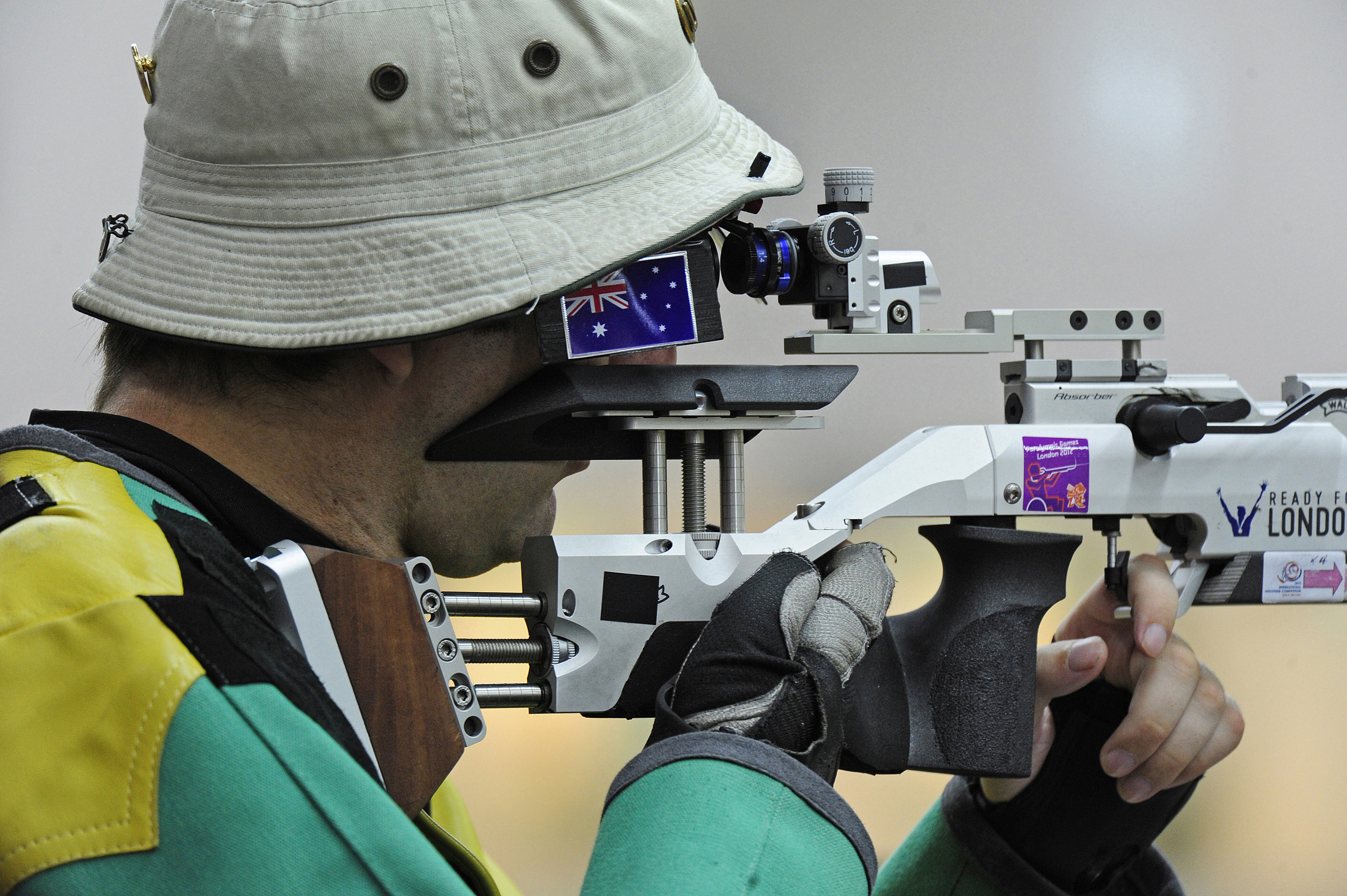
Cain shooting at the 2012 London Paralympics

Cain is an SH2-classified shooter competing in 10m air rifle prone and 10m air rifle standing events. He has been a Victorian Institute of Sport scholarship holder since 2008, and is a member of the Springvale Range Club. He is coached by Miro Sipek as an individual and when on the national team.

As a youngster, Cain hunted with his father and cousin. He took up the sport of shooting because it was one of the few available to people with his physical limitations. As of 2012, he was sponsored by Miall's Gun Shop of Frankston, Victoria, who provided him with competition gear including cleaning supplies, a rifle case and a rifle. He holds two world records, one in the individual 600–600 R4 prone event, and another in the R4 10-metre standing event.

Cain started competing in 2007, and made the Australian national team the same year. During Australia's 2009 domestic series, the Australia Cup, an invitation-only series for the top shooters in the country, he earned a bronze, silver and gold medal. That year, he made his national team debut at an international event when he represented Australia at the 2009 ISSF World Cup in South Korea. By early 2010, he was looking for a sponsor to assist with costs for his international competitions. He set a personal best of 598 out of 600 in the SH-2 prone air event at the 2010 World Cup in Germany, and not long after, set a new personal best when he shot 599 at the same event at the 2010 World Cup in France. He came in first at the 2010 Oceania Shooting Federation Continental Championship. At the 2010 IPC Shooting World Championships in Zagreb, he came in first in the SH-2 prone air event by setting a world record of 600 points, a perfect score. At the 2011 Great Britain International, he finished second in the 10m air rifle prone event. He competed in the United States-hosted International Paralympic Committee World Cup in 2011, finishing fourth in the R5 Air Rifle Prone event with a score of 599. He earned a gold medal in the team event with teammates Jason Maroney and Bradley Mark. In 2012, he trained up to six days a week. At the Australian nationals, he finished second in the prone event behind New Zealander Michael Johnson, and third in the standing event behind fellow Australian Bradley Marks and Johnson.

Cain was selected to represent Australia at the 2012 Summer Paralympics in Mixed R5-10m Air Rifle Prone-SH2 and Mixed R4-10m Air Rifle Standing-SH2 shooting events. Competing on 3 September, he did not medal, finishing 27th in the standing event and 28th in the prone event.

Most recently Cain had represented Australia in the 2016 Rio Paralympics. He competed in the Mixed 10 m air rifle standing SH2 and the Mixed 10 m air rifle prone SH2. Cain did not medal, placing 26th in the standing event and 33rd in the prone event.

=== Performance ===
Event	Competition	Date	Score	Finish	Notes	Reference
Prone Air – SH2	2012 Summer Paralympics	Sept-12	Shot 592	27th		
Prone Air – SH2	International Paralympic Committee World Cup	2011	Shot 599+105.6	4th		
Prone Air – SH2	World Cup GB	Oct-10	Shot 598	4th		
Prone Air – SH2	World Championships Croatia	Jul-10	Shot 600	9th	New personal best	
Prone Air – SH2	Aus Cup	Jul-10	Shot 599	2nd		
Prone Air – SH2	AISL GP	Jul-10	Shot 597	3rd		
Prone Air – SH2	World Cup France	May-10	Shot 599	9th	New personal best	
Prone Air – SH2	World Cup Germany	May-10	Shot 598	10th	New personal best	
Prone Air – SH2	Australia Cup	May-10	Shot 596	1st		
Prone Air – SH2	Nationals	Mar-10	Shot 593	2nd		
Prone Air – SH2	Australia Cup	Feb-10	Shot 597	2nd		
Prone Air – SH2	Oceania	Dec-09	Shot 597	1st		
Prone Air – SH2	Aus Cup Final	Oct-09	Shot 597	3rd		
Prone Air – SH2	Aus Cup	Sep-09	Shot 597	1st		
Prone Air – SH2	Arafura	May-09	Shot 595	3rd		
Prone Air – SH2	Korea Cup	Apr-09	Shot 596	11th		
Prone Air – SH2	Nationals	Apr-09	Shot 597	3rd		
Prone Air – SH2	Aus Cup	Mar-09	Shot 591	3rd		
Standing Air – SH2	2012 Summer Paralympics	Sept-12	Shot 586	28th		
Standing Air – SH2	International Paralympic Committee World Cup	2011	Shot 596+103.1	6th		
Standing Air – SH2	AISL GP	Jul-10	Shot 593	3rd		
Standing Air – SH2	World Cup France	May-10	Shot 593	11th		
Standing Air – SH2	World Cup Germany	May-10	Shot 592	13th		
Standing Air – SH2	Aus Cup	May-10	Shot 586	1st		
Standing Air – SH2	Nationals	Mar-10	Shot 588	2nd		
Standing Air – SH2	Aus Cup	Feb-10	Shot 590	2nd		
Standing Air – SH2	Oceania	Dec-09	Shot 597	2nd		
Standing Air – SH2	Aus Cup Final	Oct-09	Shot 592	2nd		
Standing Air – SH2	Aus Cup	Sep-09	Shot 594	1st		
Standing Air – SH2	Arafura	May-09	Shot 587	2nd		
Standing Air – SH2	Korea Cup	Apr-09	Shot 587	10th		
Standing Air – SH2	Nationals	Apr-09	Shot 592	2nd		
Standing Air – SH2	Aus Cup	Mar-09	Shot 592	2nd		
