= Peter Worsley (sport shooter) =

Australian sport shooter and sculptor

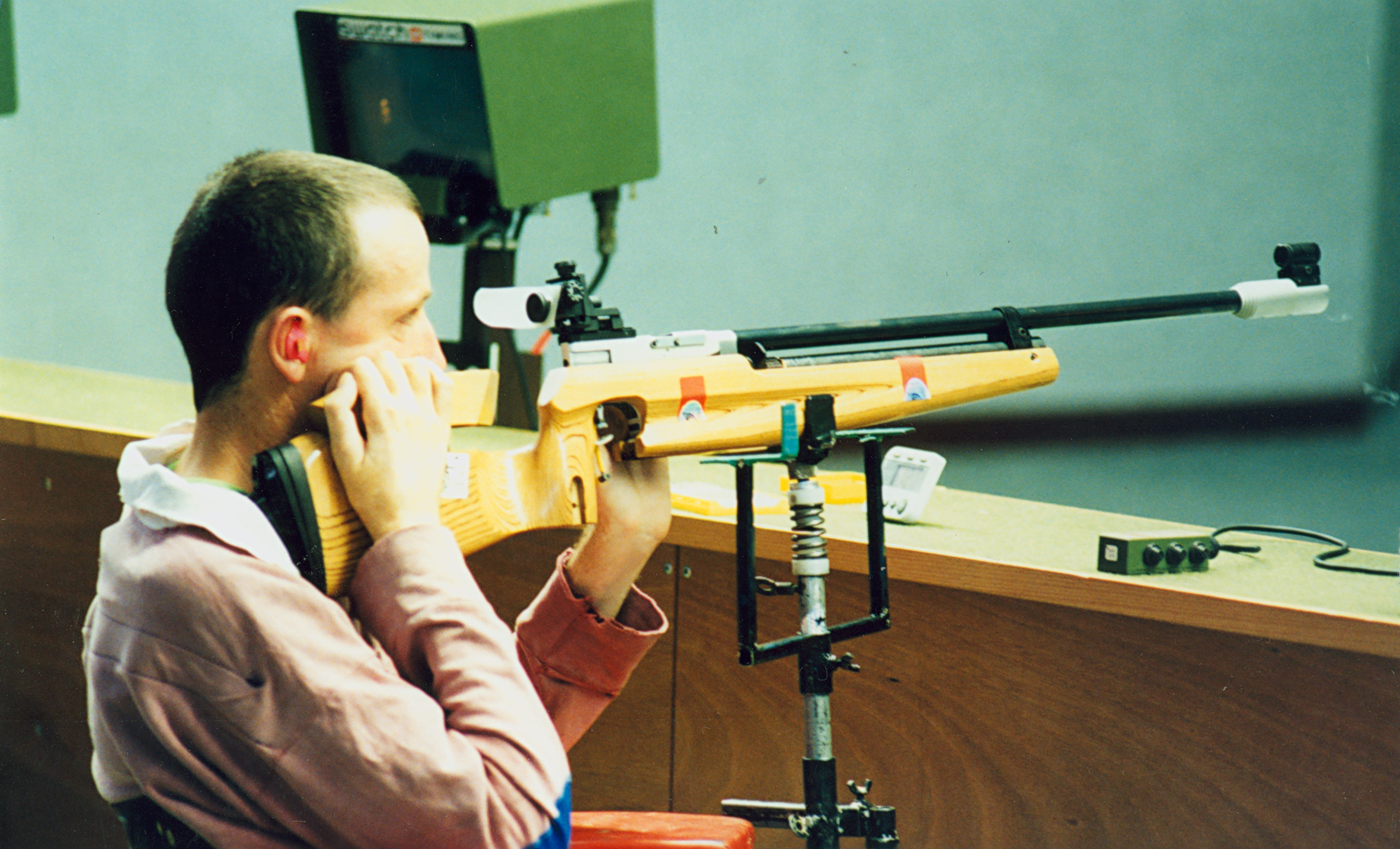
Worsley at the 1996 Atlanta Paralympics

Peter Michael Worsley (born 9 January 1968) is an Australian sculptor and Paralympic shooter. He became a quadriplegic following a Rugby Union match during his first year at university. He competed at three successive Paralympic Games from 1996 as well as the 1994 FESPIC Games, European and World Shooting Championships in Spain and Korea, Swiss Open Championships, Oceania and other International and National shooting championships.

== Personal ==
Worsley was born on 9 January 1968 in the New South Wales country town of Jerilderie. He developed his skill in shooting at the family farm in Inverell. He attended Inverell Public School and completed his high school education at Farrer Memorial Agricultural High School in Tamworth. While a student attending Wagga Wagga Agricultural College (which later became Charles Sturt University), he was injured in a scrum, suffered a broken neck, playing Hooker for the Wagga Wagga Agricultural College Rugby Union team. Following his injury, he spent eleven months in Prince Henry Hospital in Sydney. During his rehabilitation at the hospital he met Paralympic rifle shooter Allan Chadwick who inspired Worsley to take up the sport of target shooting.

A classification system regulated and monitored by the International Paralympic Committee ensures that competition is fair and equal in Paralympic Sport. Worsley's classification SH2 rifle events, requires the athlete to use a sporting stand to support the rifle and does not exclude lower limb impairment. He competed in three events prone, standing and 3x40 (40 shots in each position kneeling, standing and prone) the difference being that both the athlete's elbows may be rested on a support in prone, one elbow for kneeling but no elbows in standing.

Worsley completed his Honours Degree, Bachelor of Applied Science (Agriculture) at Charles Sturt University in 1991. He was the first student studying Agriculture to receive an Honours Degree, specializing in Remote Sensing. He continued his studies and in 1997, was admitted to the degree of Master of Rural Science, The University of New England, Armidale. He moved to the central west town of Orange in February 1992, to gain work experience with the Department of Agriculture. In August of that year he moved to Tamworth, accepted a position in the field of Bio Security with the Department of Agriculture, and has been employed in this field since 1992. While studying at University in Wagga Wagga he met Michelle. Both he and his wife Michelle, who now have two children, were employed by New South Wales Department of Agriculture, Orange.

At the 2006 SAIL-WORLD, Keen sailing-New South Wales Access Class Championships, hosted by Sailability Kogarah Bay, Worsley received The Encouragement Award, one of the nine awards presented. Twenty one sailors with a disability competed.

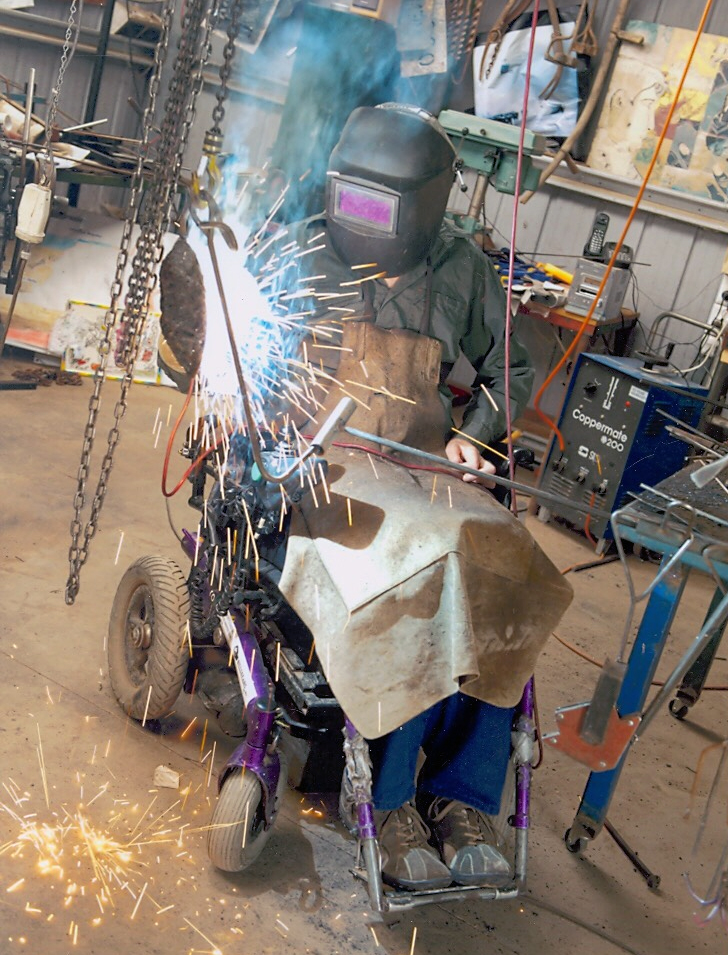
Peter Worsley is an accomplished sculptor who works in metal, welding large sculptures in his studio.

In 2011, Rocky Mileto, a quadriplegic injured in a Rugby Union accident in 1996, founded the Hearts in Union Rugby Union Foundation. He presented Worsley with a new wheelchair during half time at the Harper Bernays Rugby Challenge match, Millamolong New South Wales. $50000 was raised on behalf of the Hearts in Union charity. In 2017, this same charity donated a Miele oven and cooktop to the Worsley family. It was specifically installed to meet Peter's needs and to enjoy cooking for his family.

During fundraising at the annual Ag Races at the Murrumbidgee Turf Club New South Wales in 2016, students from Charles Sturt University, previously known as Riverina College of Advanced Education, donated $20000 of the total raised to Worsley, a former student.

Worsley's first entry into competition in the world of art was rewarded in 2017. Blayney Shire Council acquired Worsley's work Stumped. The work had to be created by a local artist, relevant to the community and accessible to the public. The art is now on display in the Council Chambers.

Worsley, who has been creating metal sculptures since about 2002, held his inaugural exhibition 'unfurl' in metal sculpture, with fellow artist Colleen Southwell, at The Corner Store Gallery, Orange New South Wales on 10 April 2018. From 14–22 May 2019 Worsley's second exhibition 'essentiae', an exhibition in paper and steel, was held in Katoomba New South Wales, with fellow artist Colleen Southwell. Funds from Accessible Arts Grants Program provided the finance to install a Gantry Crane in his workshop to assist in furthering his artistic ability for constructing sculptures from scrap metal. Worsley's recognition of the crane was appreciated in 2016. The Gantry had opened up a world of possibilities with no real limits to what he can do.

In 2019, Doctor Sumitha Gounden, rehabilitation medical director at the Orange hospital New South Wales, commissioned Worsley to display his sculptures in the hospital's rehabilitation garden. Patients would enjoy not only the beauty of the sculptures but feel inspired. This, Worsley reiterated in an interview with journalist Tanya Marsche.

== Sport shooting ==
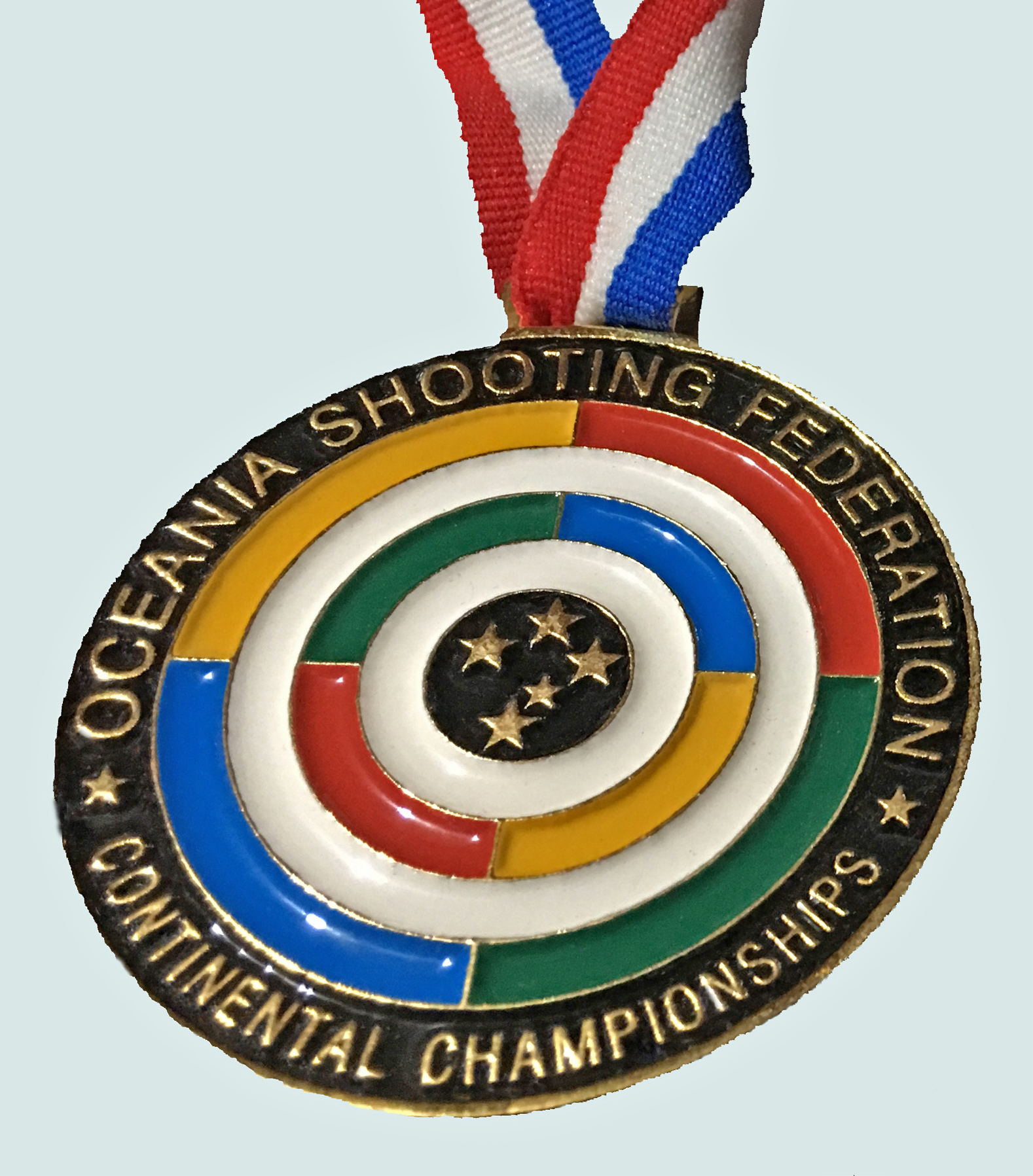
One of two gold medals won by Australian Paralympic shooter Peter Worsley at the 2001 Oceania Shooting Championships.

Worsley's first shooting competition was at the 1994 National Disabled Championships in Melbourne, where he broke 3 Australian records. That same year he competed at the FESPIC Games in Beijing. He won a gold medal in the Men's Air Rifle prone 60 shots event and a silver medal in the Men's Air Rifle 3×40 shots events. At the 1995 European Championships in Finland, he finished in 4th position in the Men's Air Rifle prone event, breaking his own Australian record with a 598/600. At the 1996 Atlanta Paralympics, he came in 22nd and 23rd in the Mixed Air Rifle SH2 events in standing and prone events respectively, and 17th in the Mixed Air Rifle 3×40 shots SH2 events. At the 1998 World Shooting Championships for the Disabled in Spain, he finished in 20th and 23rd position in the standing and prone events, respectively. At the 1999 Oceania Championships, Cecil Park Sydney, Worsley finished in 7th and 4th position in Mixed standing and prone events. With final scores of 596 and 585 in prone and standing, respectively, Worsley qualified for selection at the 2000 Summer Paralympics in Sydney. At the Korean World Championships in 2002, Worsley finished in 15th position in Air Rifle prone SH2 event. At the 2003 Swiss Open Championships, Worsley broke his prone Australian record, shot a Personal Best of 600/600 and finished in 2nd position in the final. He was one of the top 80 athletes who received an invitation to compete at the Fiocchi Final in Italy that year. At the time of these championships, he held three Australian records in standing, prone, and 3×40 shots events, was ranked fourth in the world in his classification, and broke a new Australian record for standing over 10 metres. At the 2000 Sydney Paralympics, he finished in 6th position in the standing and prone events, while he finished in 21st position in standing and 23rd in prone at the 2004 Athens Paralympics.

== Recognition ==
- 2003 – Medal of the Order of Australia OAM – For service to rifle-shooting as a competitor, and to developmental geospatial information systems for natural disaster assessment and management.
- 2000 – Australian Sports Medal – Took up competitive shooting as a paraplegic (sic), after suffering serious spinal damage in rugby union.
