= James Nomarhas =

Australian Paralympic shooter (born 1951)

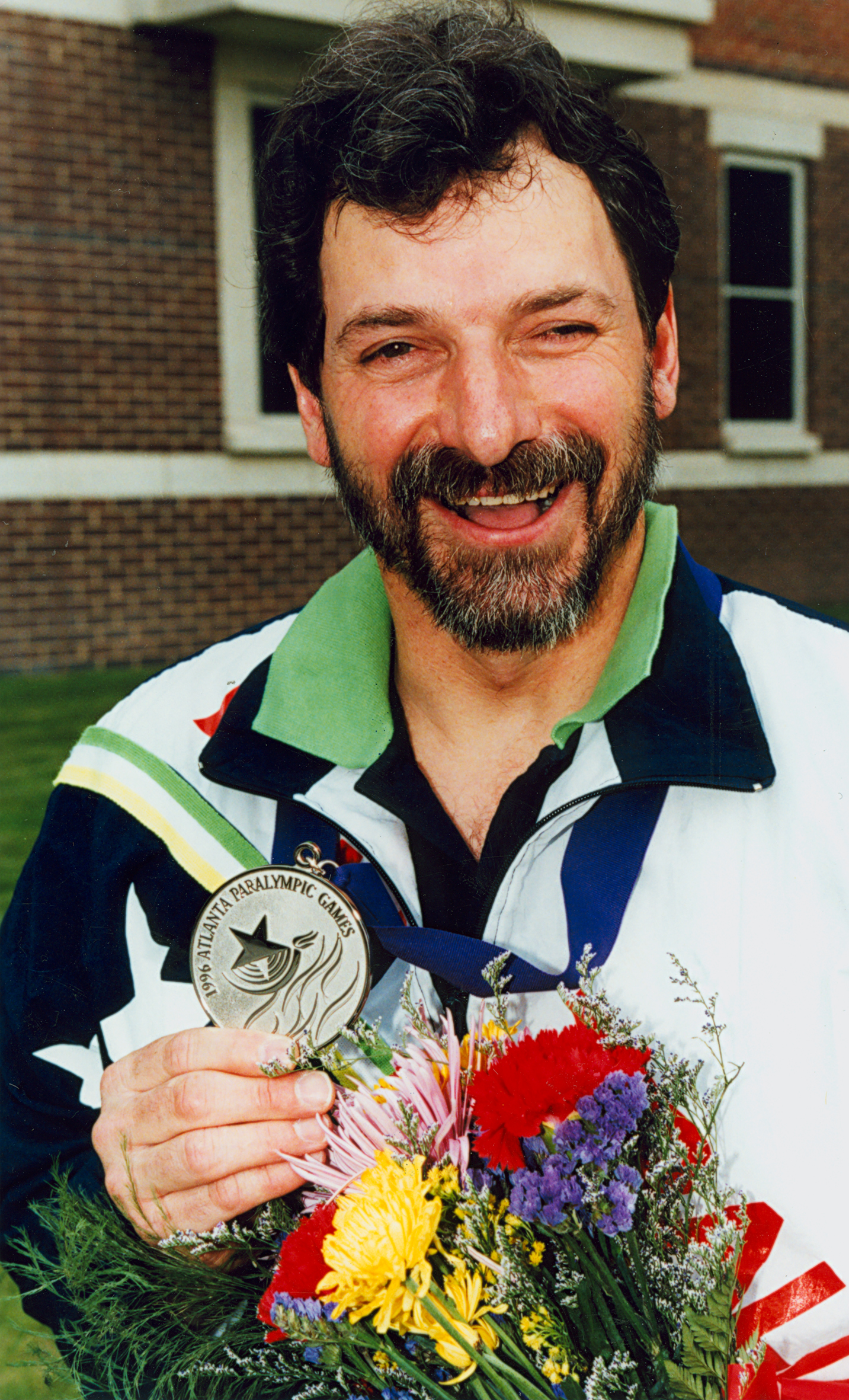
- Nomarhas displaying his silver medal at the 1996 Summer Paralympics

Personal information
- Nationality: Australia
- Born: 15 November 1951 (age 74) Wagga Wagga, New South Wales
Medal record
Shooting
Paralympic Games
| Silver medal – second place | 1996 Atlanta | Mixed Sport Pistol SH1 |

James Nomarhas (born 15 November 1951) is an Australian Paralympic shooter. He won a silver medal at the 1996 Summer Paralympics. He competed in pistol events at three successive Summer Paralympics from 1996, as well as at the World Shooting Championships, Oceania, Korean, German and National Championships, and the Arafura Games in 2009.

== Personal ==
Nomarhas was born on 15 November 1951 in the New South Wales country town of Wagga Wagga. Following completion of his high school education at Wagga Wagga High School, he was assistant photographer at Sydney University for 5 years. At 23 years of age he transferred to the National Library of Australia Canberra. Nomarhas's photographic skills were recognised. His photographic work "The flame lighting the stadium during the opening ceremony"at the Opening Ceremony of the Sydney 2000 Paralympic Games, was published in Part 11 of the text Benchmark Games. During his 34 years employment at the National Library, Nomarhas continued his sports shooting career.

The classification system in Paralympic sport ensures that competition is fair and equal. It determines the eligibility of the athlete and how they are grouped for competition. Nomarhas, classified SH1 (Pistol) is open to athletes with both upper and / or lower limb impairment. It designates Sport Class status in accordance with Classification Rules of the International Paralympic Committee.

== Sports Shooting ==
At Nomarhas' first International Paralympic Games, the 1996 Summer Paralympics, he won the silver medal in Sports Pistol Mixed SH1 event, finished 22nd in Air pistol Men event. At the Sydney 2000 Summer Paralympics, he competed in Air Pistol Men, Free Pistol and Sports Pistol Mixed events. At the Athens 2004 Summer Paralympics, Nomarhas competed in Sport Pistol Mixed.

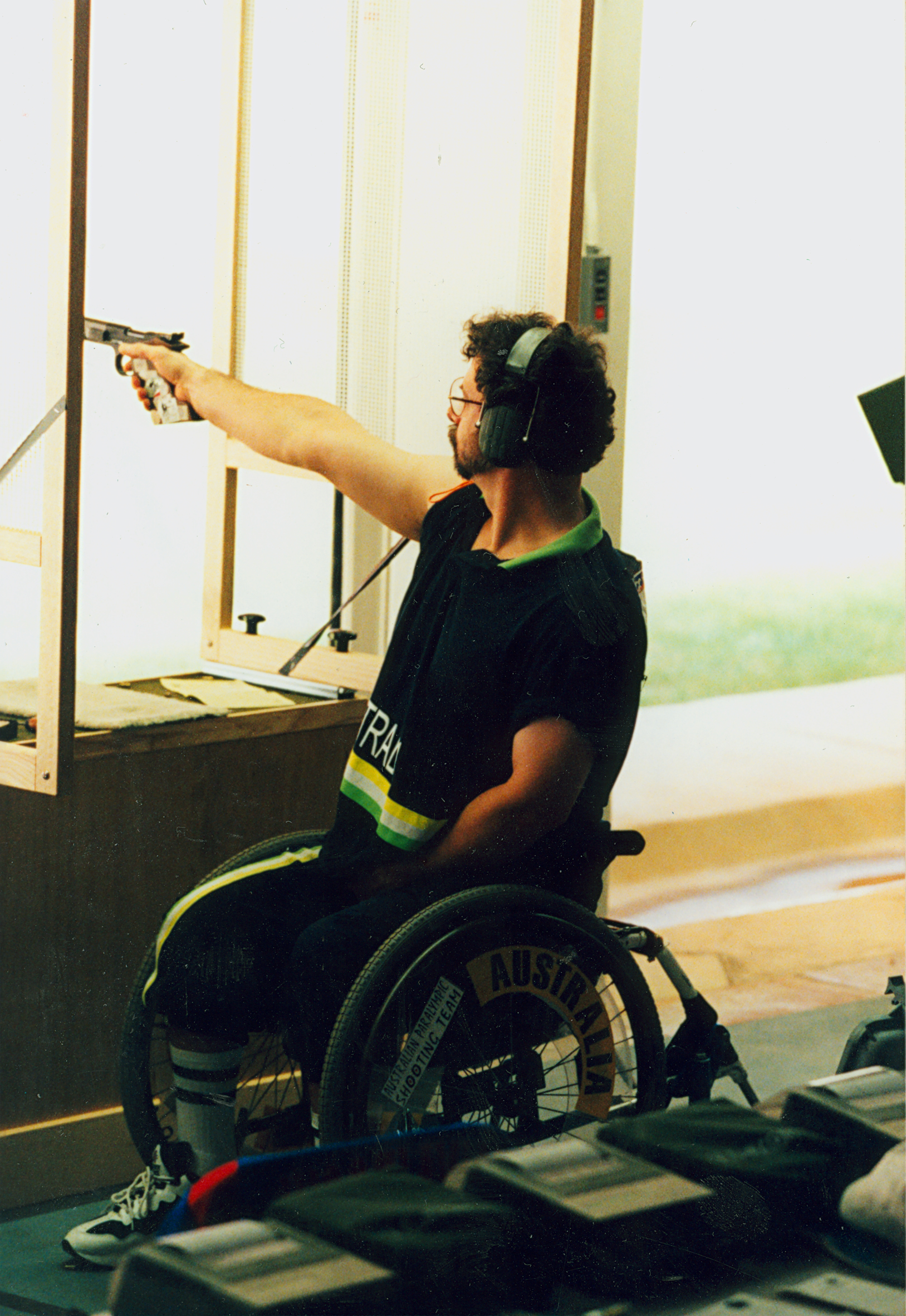
James Nomarhas competes at the 1996 summer Paralympics.

At the 1998 World Shooting Championships for the Disabled in Santander, Nomarhas competed in Air Pistol Men, Sport Pistol .22, and Free Pistol events.

At the 1999 Oceania Championships Cecil Park Sydney, Nomarhas, who competed in Air, Sport and Free Pistol events, won the bronze medal in Sport Pistol. According to the ISCD Chairman, Dane Baskin, these championships were the biggest held outside Europe.

At the 1999 Deutsche Meisterschaft Sportschiessen, Munich Germany, Nomarhas finished in 16th position in Sport Pistol and 15th in Free Pistol events.

At the Korean Open Shooting Championships for the Disabled, Seoul 1999, he competed in Air Pistol, finished one point behind Australian shooter Keith Bremner.

At the 2006 IPC World Championships, Sargans Switzerland, Nomarhas competed in Three Team competition events with team members Stephen McCormack and Jeffery Lane, the Elimination Relay Nr.

Competing at the Arafura Games 2009 - Shooting - Pistol/Air Rifle events, Nomarhas won the gold medal in both ISCD Air Pistol Men and Sport Pistol events, gold medaL ISCD Air Pistol Mens Teams with fellow team members S. McCormack and Mark Gleeson, bronze medal ISCD 50 metre Pistol event.
