= Anton Zappelli =

Australian Paralympic shooter

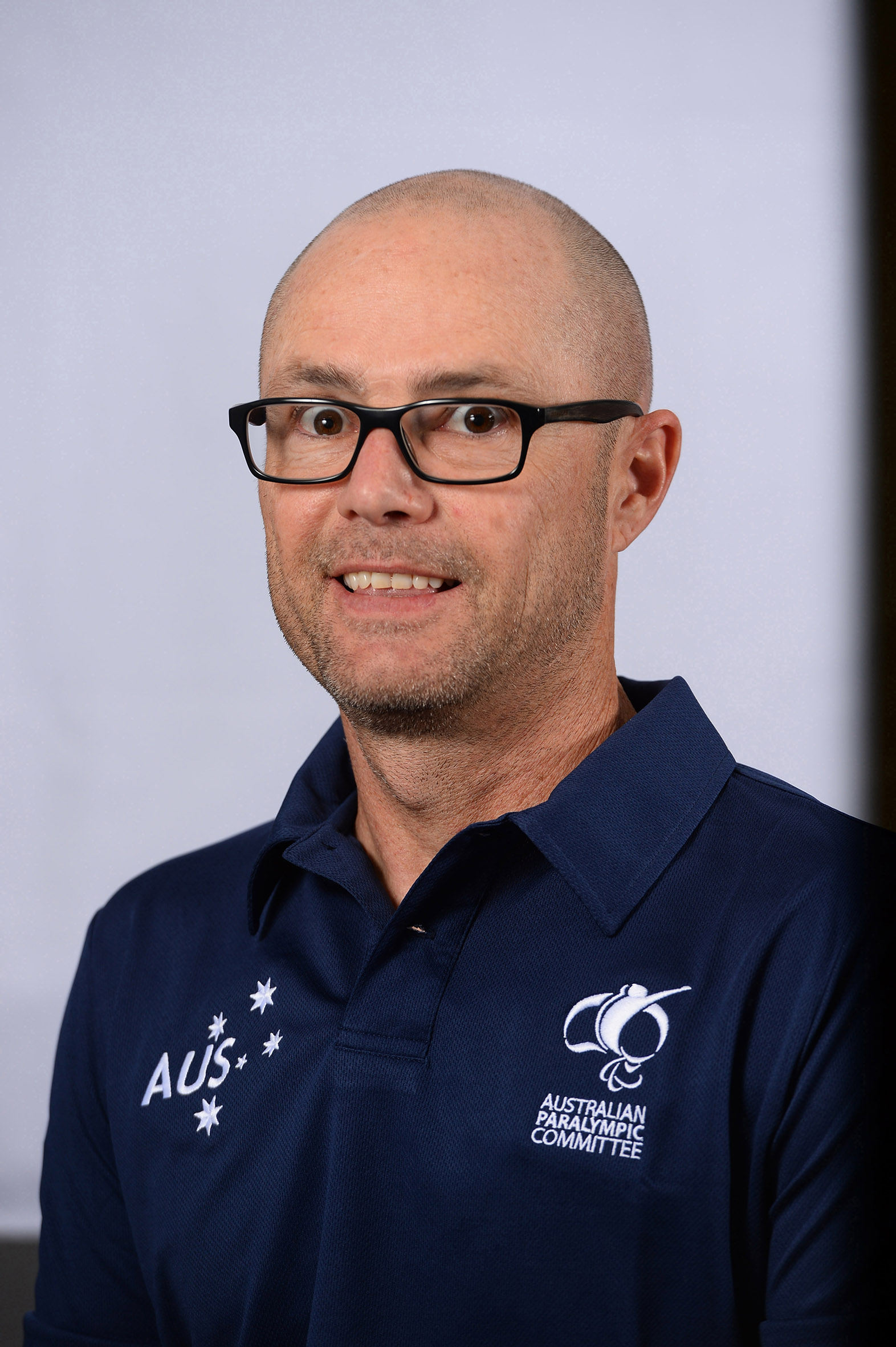
- 2016 Australian Paralympic team portrait

Personal information
- Nationality: Australian
- Born: 28 September 1971 (age 54)

Sport
- Country: Australia
- Sport: Shooting
- Club: Kalamunda Small Bore
Medal record
Shooting para sport
Representing Australia
World Championships
Silver medal – second place	2018 Cheongju	Mixed 10m Air Rifle Prone SH1
Silver medal – second place	2019 Sydney	Mixed 10m Air Rifle Prone SH1

Anton Zappelli (born 28 September 1971) is an Australian Paralympic shooter. He represented Australia at the 2016 Rio Paralympics, 2020 Tokyo Paralympics and 2024 Paris Paralympics.

== Personal ==
Zappelli was born on 28 September 1971 in Mullewa, Western Australia. At the age of 17, in March 1989, he was involved in a car accident that left him a paraplegic T12 complete. His girlfriend who did not have a licence lost control of the vehicle. His two younger sisters were also in the car. Prior to the accident, he was an apprentice boiler maker at Monodelphous Engineering Kalgoorlie. He has studied jewellery design and manufacturing. He was a roadie for five years with the band The Waifs. He is employed as a disability support officer with Rocky Bay. In 2010, Zappelli with two paraplegics Jim Cairns and Terry Mader and quadriplegic Craig Parsons embarked on a 5000 km tour of the Australian outback to visit the sites of their motor vehicles accidents. Their tour was captured in the award-winning documentary, The Ride. Zappelli is a strong supporter of road safety. He is married with twin boys and girl.

== Shooting ==
Prior to his accident, he was a well regarded junior golfer. After the accident he took up wheelchair road racing. He took up shooting in 2011 and is classified as a SH1. He is a member of the Kalamunda Small Bore Club. Zappelli made his World Championship debut in 2014, finishing 13th in the 10m Air Rifle Prone. In 2015, at the IPC World Cup, he won the bronze medal in the 10m Air Rifle Prone SH1 and this resulted in Australia securing six quota places for the 2016 Rio Paralympics. At the 2016 IPC World Cup in Al Ain, UAE, Zappelli combined with Natalie Smith and Libby Kosmala to win the bronze medal R3 10m Air Rifle Mixed team event. In 2016, he competed in the Rio Paralympics where he placed 18th in the Mixed 10 metre air rifle prone SH1 and placed 36th in the Mixed 50 metre rifle prone SH1.

Zappelli with Natalie Smith and Glen McMurtrie won the silver medal in the Team R3 - Mixed 10m Air Rifle prone SH1 at the 2018 World Shooting Para Sport Championships, Cheongju, South Korea.

At the 2019 World Para-sport Shooting Championships in Sydney, he won his first world championship medal with silver in the Mixed 10m Air Rifle Prone SH1.

At the 2020 Summer Paralympics, he finished 15th in the Mixed 10m Air Rifle Prone SH1 and 11th in the Mixed 50m Air Rifle Prone SH1. At the 2024 Summer Paralympics, he finished 15th in the Mixed 10m Air Rifle Prone SH1 and 18th in the Mixed 50m Air Rifle Prone SH1.

== Recognition ==
- 2019 - Shooting Australia Ashley Adams Athlete of the Year
- 2019 - Shooting Australia Para-shooter of the Year
- 2022 - Shooting Australia High Performance Program Winner for Para-shooting
