= Keith Bremner =

Australian paralympic shooter

Keith Bremner ( 1947 – 2013) was an Australian Paralympic Shooter, who participated in other sports at International Paralympic Games. He competed at four successive Summer Paralympics from 1984, FESPIC Games, International Stoke Mandeville Games, World Shooting Championships, Oceania and Korean Shooting Championships for the Disabled. He was Chairman and long-term member of the Paraplegic and Quadriplegic Association of New South Wales, and long-term member of Wheelchair Sports New South Wales.

== Personal ==
Bremner was born October 1947 in the New South Wales country town of Bathurst. He was elected Chairman of The Paraplegic & Quadriplegic Association of NSW from June 1981 – 1983. This followed his nomination by fellow Paralympian Bruce Thwaite and his long term membership with the organisation. He resigned as Chairman of the Sports Sub-Committee at that same meeting.

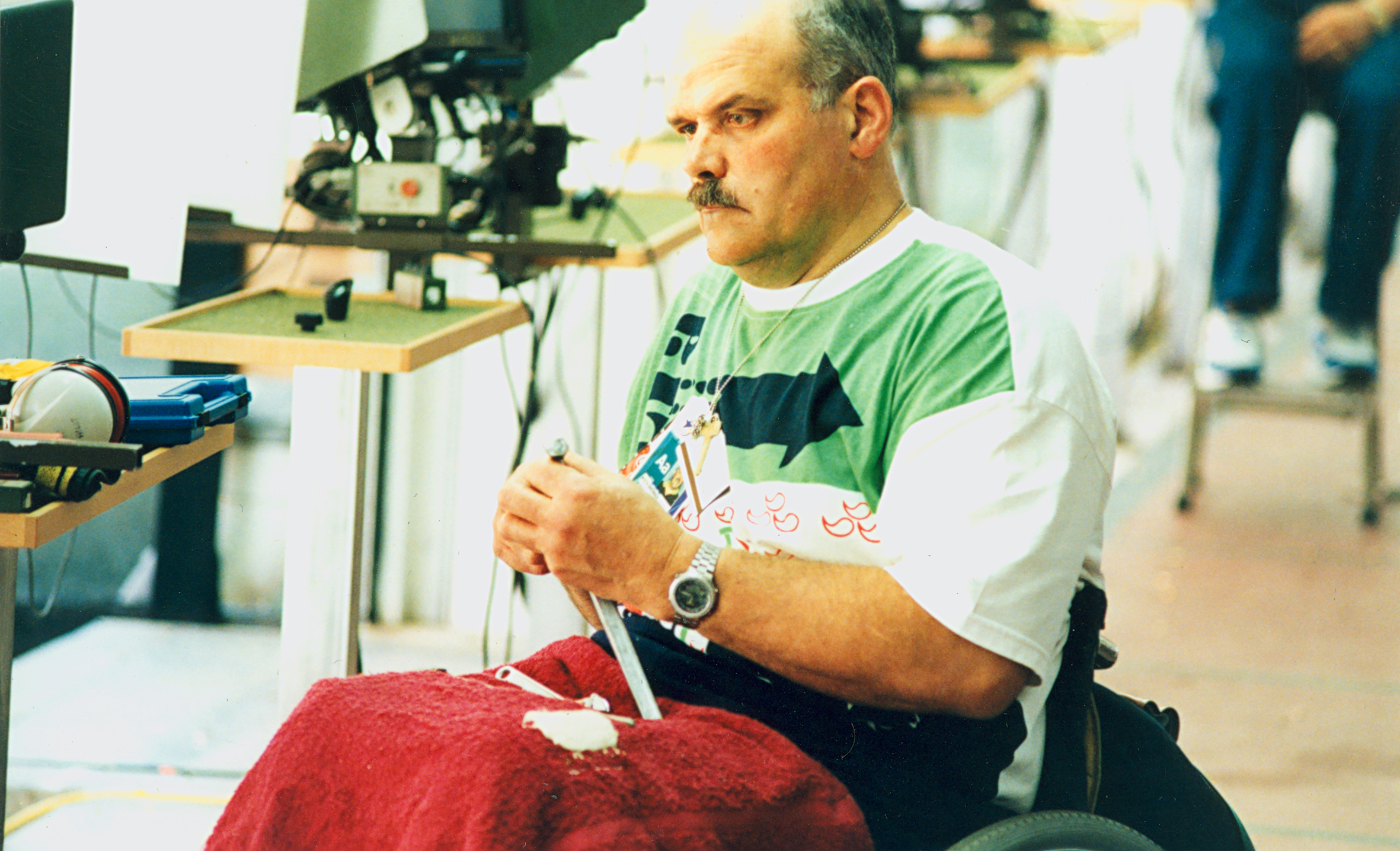
Australian paralympic shooter, Keith Bremner, at the shooting event during the Atlanta 1996 Paralympic Games.

At the 50 Year Reunion of Wheelchair Sports NSW, Bremner was recognized as one of its two longest-serving members, having been with the organization for over forty years.

In Paralympic sport a classification system ensures that competition is fair and equal. Bremner's classification SH1, governed by World Shooting Para Sport, designates Sport Class Status in accordance with the Classification Rules of the International Paralympic Committee. This classification applies to both pistol and rifle status if the athlete has a permanent lower limb impairment. After competing in pistol events at the 1984 Summer Paralympics, Bremner competed in rifle events at the 1988 Summer Paralympics. He returned to pistol shooting events at the 1992 Summer Paralympics and 1996 Summer Paralympics.

Bremner was a member of Australia's largest gold medal shooting team at the 1984 Summer Paralympics, and a member of Australia's largest shooting team to compete at Summer Paralympic Games. He travelled overseas more than forty times to compete during his sporting career.

In the records of the Team Members Handbook of the 1992 Summer Paralympics, Bremner was noted as a qualified musician, wool-classer, mechanic, welder and fitter/machinist with recreational interests in shooting, music and fishing.

In 2005, members of the Orange & District Pistol Club New South Wales held their Open Day at the Icely Road Range, Orange. Bremner attended to talk to people with a disability to encourage them to find a sport to which they could adjust.

== Sports shooting ==
At Bremner's first International Paralympic Games the 1984 Summer Paralympics, he competed in Men's Air Pistol SH1, class 2-6, finished in 11th position. Following his decision to compete in rifle shooting events at the 1988 Summer Paralympics, he reached the final round in Men's Air Rifle standing and 3 position team; Mixed Air Rifle prone, standing, kneeling and 3 position; in addition to the final round in Men's Air Pistol. He competed in Air and Free Pistol shooting at the 1992 Summer Paralympics. Four years later, at the 1996 Summer Paralympics Atlanta USA, he competed in Air, Sports and Free Pistol shooting events.

Teams were divided into sub-teams by impairment at the FESPIC Games of 1986 and 1989. Bremner was a member of the wheelchair shooting team at the 1986 Surakarta Games (31 Aug-7 Sept) At the 1989 Kobe FESPIC Games, Bremner finished in 5th and 7th position in Independent standing and prone events respectively, and 2nd in the prone team event; 7th in Independent kneeling, 6th in 3 position Independent and 3rd in the kneeling team event with C. Adsett and W.Brittain.

At the International Stoke Mandeville Wheelchair Games 1987, Bremner finished equal 6th in the final round of Air Pistol shooting. In 1991 at these Games, known as the Courage Games, Bremner won the Silver medal in First Class Air Pistol shooting.

At the 1998 World Shooting Championships for the Disabled in Santander, Spain, Bremner competed in Air, Sport and Free Pistol shooting events.

At the 1999 Oceania Championships Cecil Park Sydney, Bremner competed in Air, Sports and Free Pistol shooting events.

At the 1999 Korean Open Shooting Championships for the Disabled Seoul, Bremner finished in 9th position Air Pistol shooting.

In addition to his shooting career, Bremner competed in Male Tetraplegic Double FITA Archery, Discus and Shot Put at the 1981 Stoke Mandeville Wheelchair Games.
