= Peter Tait (sport shooter) =

Australian Paralympic shooter

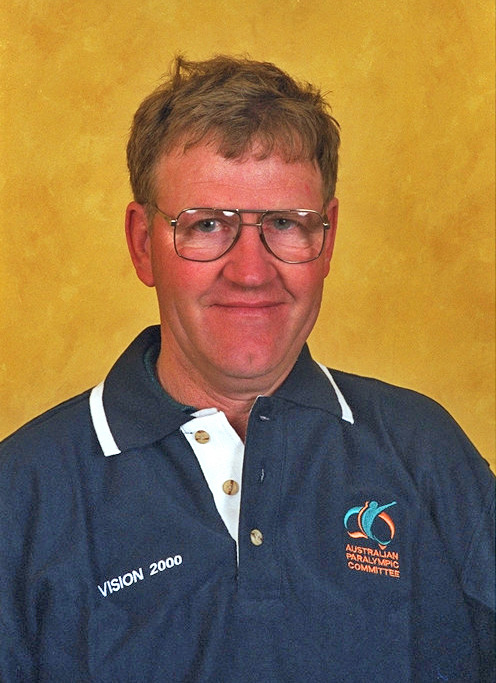
- Tait in 2000

Personal information
- Nationality: Australia
- Born: 5 March 1949 (age 77) Willaura, Victoria, Australia
Medal record
Shooting para sport
Representing Australia
Paralympic Games
Silver medal – second place	2000 Sydney	Mixed sport pistol SH1

Peter Tait (born 5 March 1949) is a former Australian Paralympic shooter. He won a silver medal at the 2000 Summer Paralympics in the Mixed Sport Pistol SH1 event, competed at the FESPIC Games, World Shooting Championships, Oceania, National and State Championships.

== Personal ==
Tait was born 5 March 1949 in the Victorian country town of Willaura. A builder by trade, his major sporting interest was in competitive pistol shooting.

In Paralympic sport a classification system ensures that competition is fair and equal. It determines the eligibility of the athlete and how they are grouped for competition. Tait's classification SH1 (pistol) is open to athletes with both upper and / or lower limb impairment. Governed by World Shooting Para Sport, it designates Sport Class Status in accordance with Classification Rules of the International Paralympic Committee.

Tait was one of the district's best shooters and a top shooter from the Ballarat Pistol Club, Mount Rowan Victoria. He assisted in match practice and technique with Olympic pistol shooter Emma Crouch, athlete at the 1988 Summer Olympics Beijing.

In announcing a $12.48 million grant to the Victorian Sports Shooting Program in 2014, the Minister Damian Drum MLC, acknowledged Tait's contribution to Victoria's proud history of medallists in sports shooting.

The new Ballarat Paralympic Walk constructed in 2018, at Lake Wendouree Victoria, honoured Peter Tait and four other Victorian Paralympic athletes. Their names will be the first etched into the design of the monument located beside the Ballarat Olympic Precinct.

== Sports Shooting ==
At the Sydney 2000 Summer Paralympics, Tait won the silver medal in the Mixed Sport Pistol SH1 event.

At the 1999 Beijing FESPIC Games, Tait won the silver medal with team members Stephen Guy and Simon McGrath in Team Air Pistol Men SH1 event, 6th position in Air Pistol Men SH1 event.

At the Deutsche Meistereschaft Sportschiessen 1999, Munich Germany, Tait won the gold medal in Sport Pistol, finished 9th Free Pistol and 10th Air Pistol events.

At the 1999 Oceania Championships Cecil Park Sydney, Tait won the silver medal in Sport Pistol, finished 7th in Air Pistol and 14th in Free Pistol event. According to ISCD Chairman Dane Baskin, these championships with 131 competitors from 24 nations formed the largest disabled shooting competition ever staged outside Europe.

At the World Shooting Championships for the Disabled in Santander in 1998, Tait finished 11th in Sport Pistol.22, 17th Air Pistol Men and 30th Free Pistol events.

In 1993, Tait won the Victorian State Title Black Powder 25 metre event. At the Victorian Amateur Pistol Association Black Powder State Titles in 2011, he finished 3rd A Grade 25 metre event, 1st C Grade 50 metre event.
