= Ashley Adams =

Australian Paralympic shooter

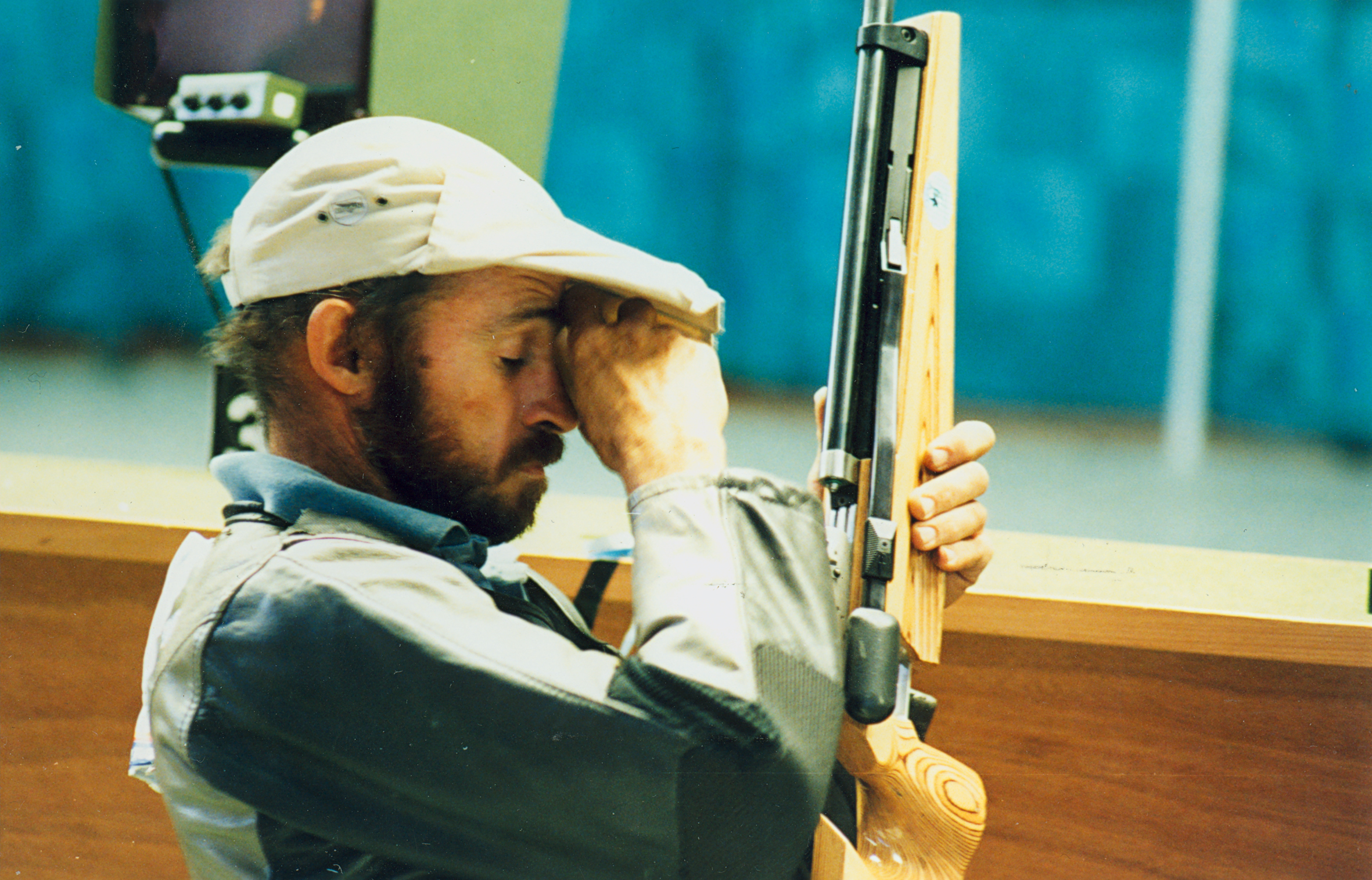
- Adams at the 1996 Summer Paralympics in Atlanta

Personal information
- Full name: Ashley Phillip Adams
- Nationality: Australia
- Born: 12 October 1955 Toowoomba, Queensland
- Died: 17 March 2015 (aged 59) Blackall
Medal record
Shooting para sport
Representing Australia
Paralympic Games
Silver medal – second place	2004 Athens	Mixed Free Rifle Prone SH1
Bronze medal – third place	2004 Athens	Men's Air Rifle Standing SH1

Ashley Phillip Adams (12 October 1955 – 17 March 2015) was an Australian Paralympic shooting medallist and cattle grazier.

== Personal ==
Adams was born on 12 October 1955 in Toowoomba. He became a paraplegic in 1982 at the age of 26 after being involved in an accident at a local motorbike competition, where he fell off his motorbike and broke his back. Following his accident, he underwent a six-month period of rehabilitation. He was a cattle grazier who owned a 64,000-acre (26,000 ha) station near Blackall, Queensland. He made extensive modifications to the station's infrastructure to improve his access to the land, including the installation of gates that open both ways. He produced TendaBeef, and supported the genetic breeding of cattle.

Adams died on 17 March 2015 after a quad bike accident on his farm. He was 59.

== Competitive shooting ==
Adams was a competitive sport shooter. He started shooting competitively in 1993, after some previous experience with shooting working on farms. Events he competed in included R3 Mixed Air Rifle Prone, R1 Men's 10m Air Rifle Standing, R6 Mixed 50m Free Rifle Prone and R7 Free Rifle 3x40 50m. When he competed in club-based events, he represented the Charleville Small Bore Rifle Club. He shot from a prone position on the ground similar to that of Olympic competitors, instead of a prone position in his wheelchair. He had an Australian Institute of Sport scholarship from 1998 to 2000.

In 1998, Adams set a world record at the English Match and won a gold medal in the 50m Rifle Prone event at the IPC Shooting World Championships in Santander, Spain. He finished first at the Swiss Open in 2002 and 2003. In 2007, he won a gold medal and a bronze medal at the Korean Cup. That same year, he finished first at the Australian Open Able-body Prone National Championship. In 2011, he competed in ISSF World Cup events in Turkey and Spain, where he finished first in the Spanish .22 event and second in the Turkish air rifle event. In Spain, he also picked up fourth place in the men's R7 50m rifle 3 position SH1 event and seventh in the R1 10m air rifle SH1 event.

In 2011, he was ranked first in the world in two different shooting events. In that year, he was also ranked as one of the top able-bodied open shooters in Australia. He was ranked in the top ten in the world for three events at the end of 2014.

=== Paralympics ===
Adams first represented Australia at an international level in the 1996 Atlanta Paralympics. He went on to compete at the 2000 Sydney, 2004 Athens, 2008 Beijing and 2012 London Paralympics. at the 2004 Athens Games, he won a silver medal in the Mixed Free Rifle Prone SH1 event and a bronze medal in the Men's Air Rifle Standing SH1 event. At the 2008 Beijing Games, he finished fourth in both the 10 m air rifle standing event the 50 m free rifle prone events. He finished in the top twenty in all four of his events at the 2012 London Games.

== Recognition ==
Adams was recognised several times for his sporting accomplishments. He won a Merit Award given out by the Australian Paralympic Committee. He twice won the Male Athlete Senior Sporting Wheelies Award and received an Australian Sports Medal in 2000.

Australia's national peak body for target shooting sports, Shooting Australia, awards the Ashley Adams Perpetual Trophy each year, which recognises the best and fairest athlete of a calendar year as voted upon by only "Aiming4Gold" squadded athletes.
