= Barbara Caspers =

Australian Paralympic shooter

Personal information
- Nationality: Australia
Medal record
Shooting
Paralympic Games
Gold medal – first place	1980 Arnhem	Mixed Air Rifle Kneeling 1A–1C
Silver medal – second place	1980 Arnhem	Mixed Air Rifle 3 Positions 1A–1C
Bronze medal – third place	1980 Arnhem	Mixed Air Rifle Standing 1A–1C
Gold medal – first place	1984 New York/Stoke Mandeville	Women's Air Rifle Kneeling 1A–1C
Gold medal – first place	1984 New York/Stoke Mandeville	Women's Air Rifle Prone 1A–1C
Gold medal – first place	1984 New York/Stoke Mandeville	Women's Air Rifle Standing 1A–1C
Gold medal – first place	1984 New York/Stoke Mandeville	Mixed Air Rifle 3 Positions 1A–1C

Barbara Caspers is an Australian Paralympic shooter. At the 1980 Arnhem Games, she won a gold medal in the Mixed Air Rifle Kneeling 1A–1C event, a silver medal in the Mixed Air Rifle 3 Positions 1A–1C event, and a bronze medal in the Mixed Air Rifle Standing 1A–1C event. At the 1984 New York/Stoke Mandeville Games, she won four gold medals in the Women's Air Rifle Kneeling 1A–1C, Women's Air Rifle Prone 1A–1C, Women's Air Rifle Standing 1A–1C, and Mixed Air Rifle 3 Positions 1A–1C events. She competed but did not win any medals at the 1988 Seoul Games.
