= Jason Maroney =

Australian shooter (born 1967)

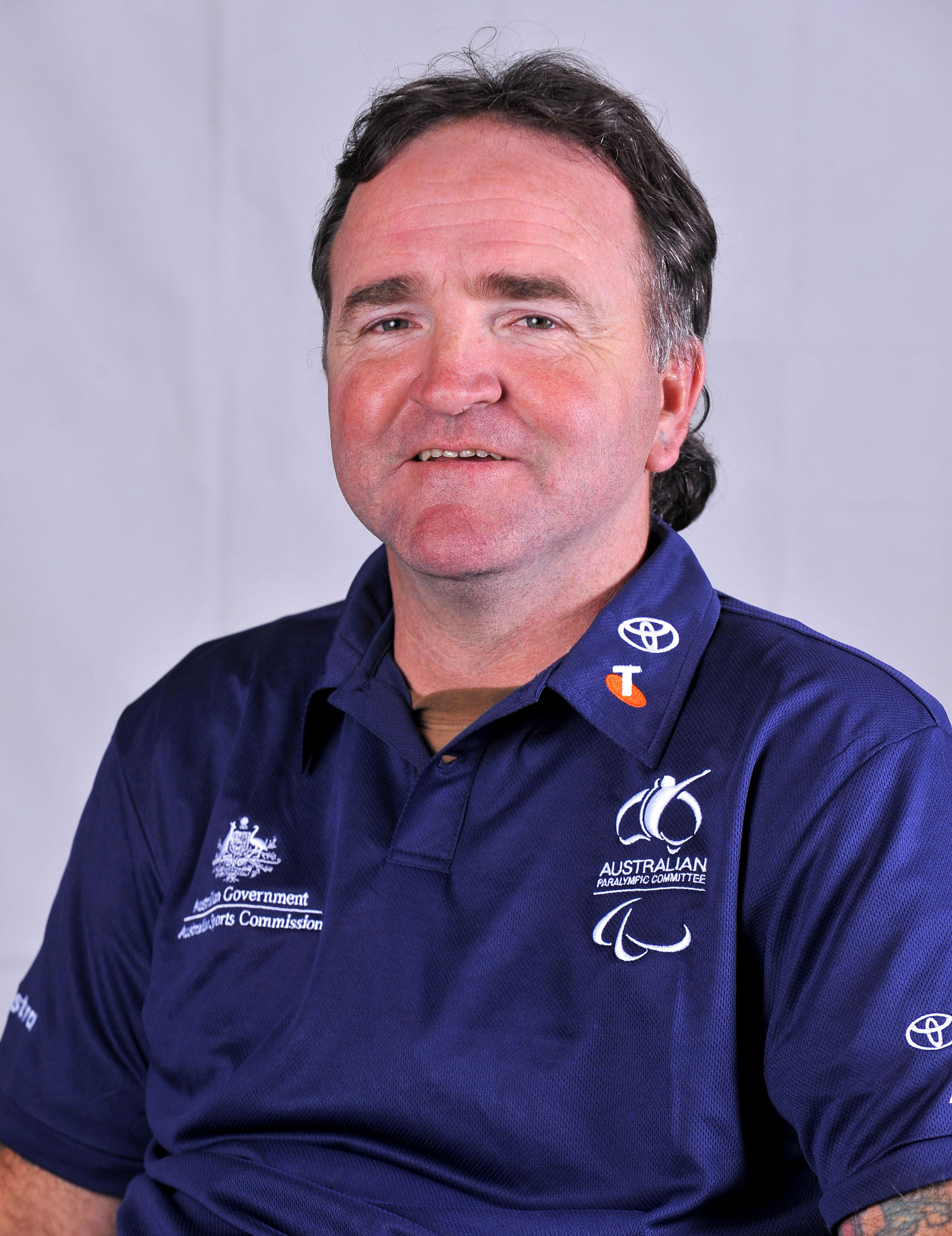
- 2012 Australian Paralympic team portrait of Maroney

Personal information
- Nationality: Australian
- Born: 19 March 1967 (age 59)

Sport
- Country: Australia
- Sport: Shooting
- Event(s): R4-10m air rifle standing SH2; R4 Air Rifle; R5 Air Rifle

Jason Maroney (born 19 March 1967) is an Australian shooter. He was selected to represent Australia at the 2012 Summer Paralympics in shooting. He did not medal at the 2012 Games.

== Personal ==
Maroney was born on 19 March 1967. He is originally from Glenrowan, Victoria. He spent time in the army. He became a quadriplegic as a result of a car accident when he was 19 years old. He uses a wheelchair.

== Shooting ==
Maroney is a shooter. He is classified as a SH2 shooter.

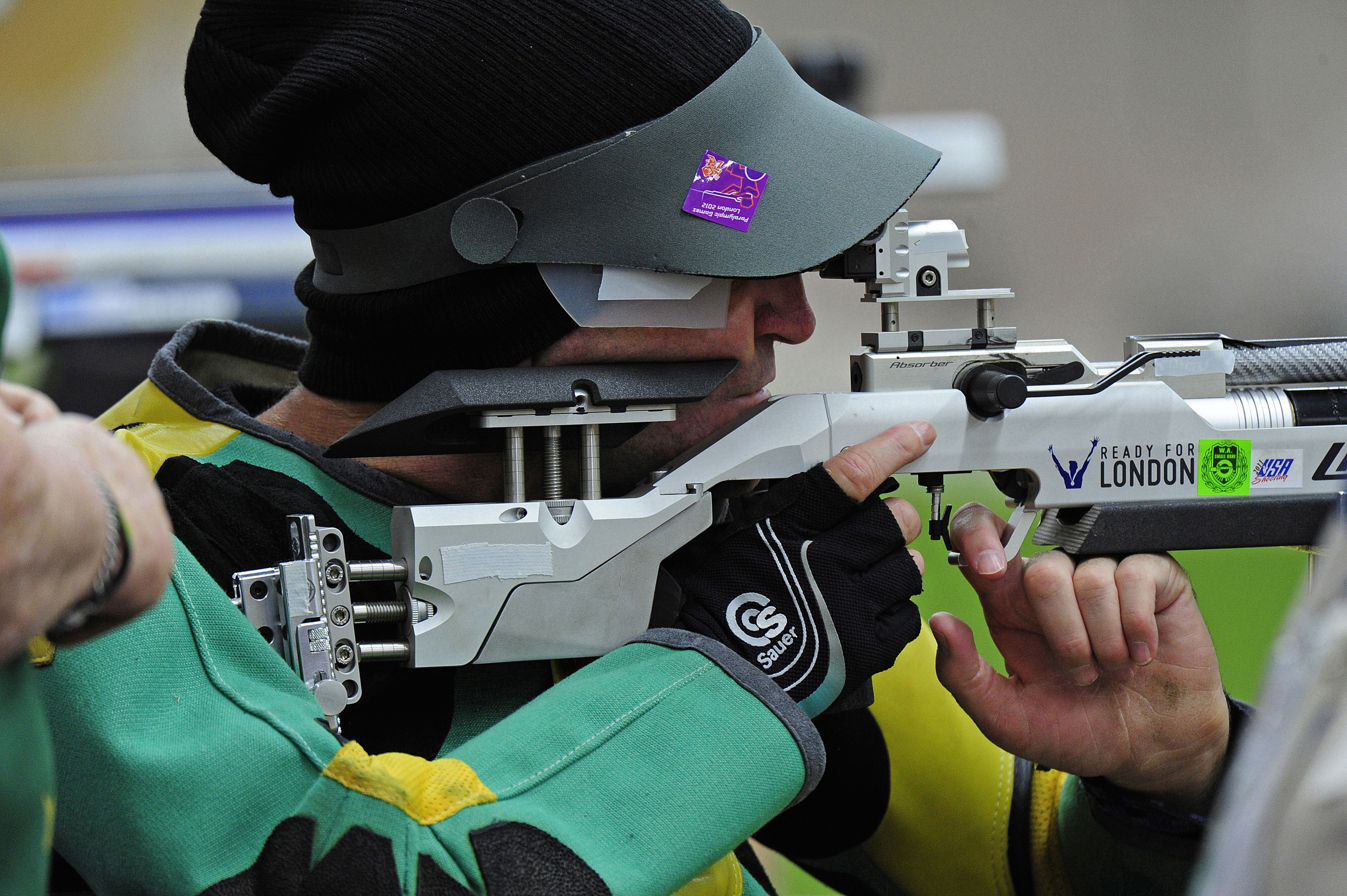
Maroney shooting at the 2012 London Paralympics

Maroney took up competitive shooting in 2004. He first represented Australia in 2005. In 2006, he demonstrated the sport to six people with disabilities as part of a Sporting Shooters Association of Australia (SSAA) held the Shooting For All day event in Springvale. He competed at the 2008 Summer Paralympics, making the finals in the mixed R5-10m air rifle prone SH2 event and finishing sixth overall. He finished fifth in the mixed R4-10m air rifle standing SH2 event. He finished first at the Korean hosted 2009 Open Asian Championships. He finished second at the 2010 World Championships. He was selected to represent Australia at the 2012 Summer Paralympics in shooting in the R4 and R5 Air Rifle events. The 2012 Games were his second. He did not medal at the 2012 Games.
