= Allan Chadwick =

Australian Paralympic shooter

Personal information
- Nationality: Australia
Medal record
Shooting
Paralympic Games
Gold medal – first place	1984 New York/Stoke Mandeville	Men's Rifle Prone – Tetraplegic (Aids) 1A–1C

Allan Chadwick is an Australian Paralympic shooter. At the 1984 New York/Stoke Mandeville Games, he won a gold medal in the Men's Rifle Prone – Tetraplegic (Aids) 1A–1C event. He also competed in shooting but did not win any medals at the 1988 Seoul Games.
