= Natalie Smith (sport shooter) =

Australian Paralympic shooter

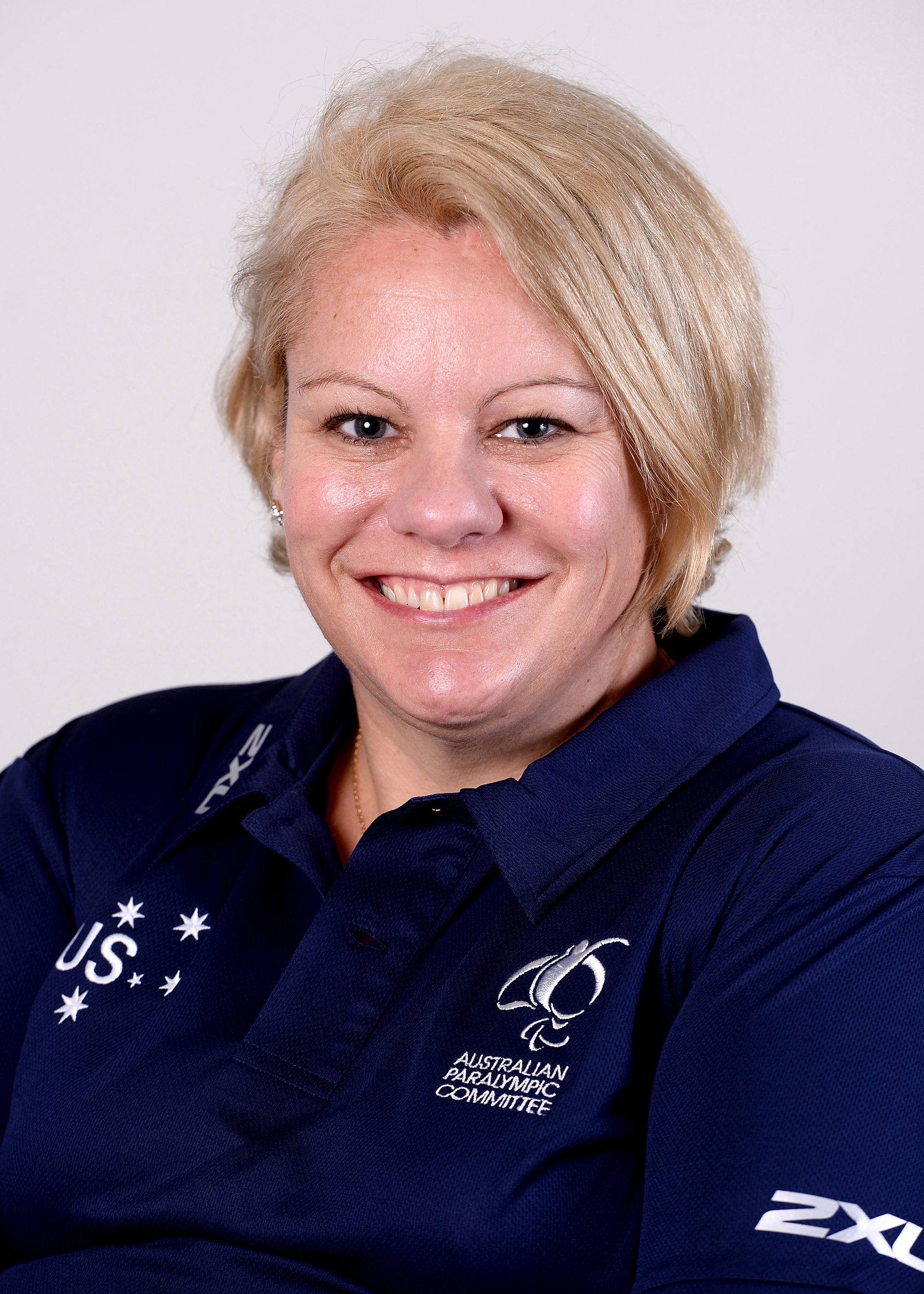
- 2016 Australian Paralympic team portrait

Personal information
- Nationality: Australian
- Born: 23 April 1975 (age 51)

Sport
- Country: Australia
- Sport: Shooting
Medal record
Women's shooting para sport
Representing Australia
Paralympic Games
| Bronze medal – third place | 2012 London | 10 m air rifle standing SH1 |

Natalie Smith (born 23 March 1975) is an Australian Paralympic shooter. At the 2012 Summer Paralympics, she won a bronze medal. She also represented Australia at the 2016 Rio Paralympics, 2020 Tokyo Paralympics and 2024 Paris Paralympics.

== Personal ==
Smith was born on 23 March 1975. She was originally from Fitzgibbon, Queensland. When she was 34 years old, she had an accident while hiking that left her a paraplegic. Prior to her accident, she was a skydiver and equestrian rider. She is married to Stuart and in 2014 she gave birth to a son Daniel.

Shooting is a family sport, as her grandfather is Norman Lutz who was supposed to represent Australia at the 1956 Summer Olympics but ultimately missed the Games because of a heart attack. She lives in Brisbane and works as a nurse.

== Shooting ==
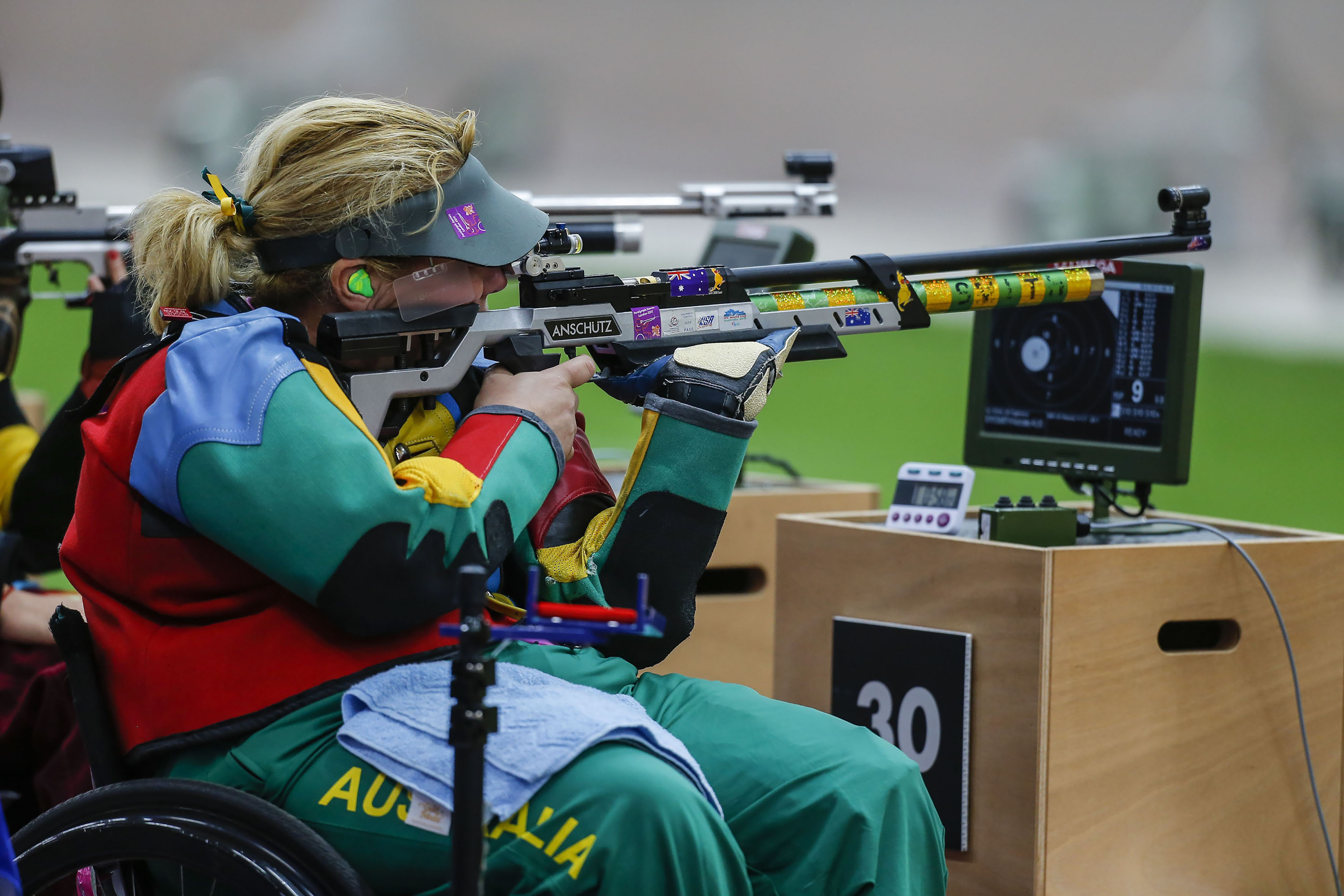
Smith competing at the 2012 London Paralympics

Smith is an SH1 classified shooter competing in 10m Air Rifle Prone and 10m Air Rifle Standing events.

Smith started competitive shooting in 2010 following an Australian Paralympic Committee talent search. She made the Australian Paralympic shooting shadow team in 2011. At the 2011 IPC World Cup meet in Fort Benning, she won a gold medal in the SH1 standing air rifle event. In the process, she set an Australian record.

She was selected to represent Australia at the 2012 Summer Paralympics in shooting. The Games were her first. There she participated in the Women's 10 m Air Rifle standing SH1 and Mixed 10 m Air Rifle prone SH1 – winning a bronze in the 10 m Air Rifle standing.

In November 2015 at the International Paralympic Committee World Cup in Fort Benning, United States, she won the gold medal in the R8 SH1 3 Position rifle event and set a new Australian record of 576 in qualification.

In 2015, she has a scholarship with the Queensland Academy of Sport.

In the 2016 Rio Paralympics she represented Australia in four rifle events although did not win a medal, her best result was 5th overall in the Women's R2-10m Air Rifle Standing - SH1.

At the 2020 Summer Paralympics, she finished 19th in the Women's 10m Air Rifle Standing SH1 and 46th in the Mixed R3-10 m Air Rifle Prone SH1. At the 2024 Summer Paralympics, she finished 12th in the Women's 10m Air Rifle Standing SH1 and 8th in the R8 Women's 50 metre rifle 3 positions SH1.

She has held a scholarship with the Queensland Academy of Sport.
