= World Shooting Para Sport Championships =

The World Shooting Para Sport Championships, originally known as the IPC Shooting World Championships, are the world championships for shooting where athletes with a disability compete. They are organised by the International Paralympic Committee (IPC) on a four year rotation with the Paralympic Games.

The Championships are open to both men and women, with two main classifications, SH1 and SH2. SH1 classification shooting events include pistols and rifles, while SH2 events are rifles only.

The IPC, which serves as the international governing body for shooting involving competitors with disabilities, changed the sport's name to "Shooting Para sport" effective 30 November 2016. At the same time, it adopted the "World Para" branding for the committees that govern all disability sports for which it serves as the international federation, including shooting.

== History ==
Number	Edition	Venue	Dates	Best nation
1	1994	Linz, Austria		Germany
2	1998	Santander, Spain		
3	2002	Seoul, South Korea		China
4	2006	Sargans, Switzerland		
5	2010	Zagreb, Croatia	16–23 July	
6	2014	Suhl, Germany	18–26 July	South Korea
7	2018	Cheongju, South Korea	1–12 May	South Korea
8	2019	Sydney, Australia	12–18 October	Ukraine
9	2022	Al Ain, United Arab Emirates	6–17 November	Ukraine
10	2026	Changwon, South Korea	3–14 September	
