= Cycling at the 2024 Summer Paralympics – Women's road time trial C1–3 =

Women's road time trial C1–3 at the XVII Paralympic Games
- Venue: Clichy-sous-Bois
- Dates: 4 September
- Competitors: 16 from 13 nations
- Winning time: 21:30.45

Medalists
1st place, gold medalist(s)		Maike Hausberger	Germany
2nd place, silver medalist(s)		Frances Brown	Great Britain
3rd place, bronze medalist(s)		Anna Beck	Sweden

The Women's time trial C1–3 road cycling event at the 2024 Summer Paralympics took place on 4 September 2024, at Clichy-sous-Bois, Paris. 16 riders competed in the event.

The C1-3 classification is for cyclists described as follows:

- C1: severe hemiplegic or diplegic spasticity; severe athetosis or ataxia; bilateral through knee amputation, etc.
- C2: moderate hemiplegic or diplegic spasticity; moderate athetosis or ataxia; unilateral above knee amputation, etc.
- C3: moderate hemiplegic or diplegic spasticity; moderate athetosis or ataxia; bilateral below knee or unilateral through knee amputation, etc.

As this is a composite classification event, times are factored.

== Results ==
Rank	Rider	Nationality	Class	r.t.	Factor	Result	n.d.	Notes
1st place, gold medalist(s)	Maike Hausberger	Germany	C2	22:10.09	97.02%	21:30.45		
2nd place, silver medalist(s)	Frances Brown	Great Britain	C1	23:57.73	90.85%	21:46.18	+00:15.73	
3rd place, bronze medalist(s)	Anna Beck	Sweden	C3	21:54.71	100.00%	21:54.71	+00:24.26	
4	Flurina Rigling	Switzerland	C2	22:35.40	97.02%	21:55.01	+00:24.56	
5	Daphne Schrager	Great Britain	C2	22:56.94	97.02%	22:15.91	+00:45.46	
6	Keiko Sugiura	Japan	C3	22:38.53	100.00%	22:38.53	+01:08.08	
7	Wang Xiaomei	China	C3	22:44.59	100.00%	22:44.59	+01:14.14	
8	Clara Brown	United States	C3	22:58.00	100.00%	22:58.00	+01:27.55	
9	Qian Wangwei	China	C1	25:35.09	90.85%	23:14.63	+01:44.18	
10	Daniela Munévar	Colombia	C2	24:12.75	97.02%	23:29.46	+01:59.01	
11	Jamie Whitmore	United States	C3	23:57.57	100.00%	23:57.57	+02:27.12	
12	Richael Timothy	Ireland	C3	24:32.40	100.00%	24:32.40	+03:01.95	
13	Amanda Reid	Australia	C2	26:06.41	97.02%	25:19.73	+03:49.28	
14	Mel Pemble	Canada	C3	26:05.83	100.00%	26:05.83	+04:35.38	
15	Sabrina Custodia da Silva	Brazil	C2	27:54.55	97.02%	27:04.65	+05:34.20	
16	Jyoti Gaderiya	India	C2	30:55.45	97.02%	30:00.16	+08:29.71	
