= Cycling at the 2024 Summer Paralympics – Women's individual pursuit C1–3 =

Women's individual pursuit C1–3 at the XVII Paralympic Games
- Venue: Vélodrome National, Saint-Quentin-en-Yvelines
- Dates: 29 August 2024
- Competitors: 10 from 9 nations
- Winning time: 3:41.692 WR

Medalists
1st place, gold medalist(s)		Wang Xiaomei	China
2nd place, silver medalist(s)		Daphne Schrager	Great Britain
3rd place, bronze medalist(s)		Flurina Rigling	Switzerland

The women's individual pursuit class C1–3 track cycling event at the 2024 Summer Paralympics took place on 29 August 2024 at the Vélodrome National, Saint-Quentin-en-Yvelines. This class (C) is for the cyclist who has impairments that affect their legs, arms, and/or trunk but are still capable of using a standard bicycle. 10 cyclists representing 9 nations shall take part.

== Competition format ==
The competition begins with a qualifying round where the cyclists are divided into heats with 2 cyclists each; they compete on a time trial basis. The two fastest overall in the qualifying round qualify to the gold medal final; the 3rd and 4th fastest will qualify to the bronze medal final.

The distance of this event is 3000m. The event finals are held on the same day as the qualifying.

The classifications of C1, C2 and C3 are described by the IPC as follows:

- C1: severe hemiplegic or diplegic spasticity; severe athetosis or ataxia; bilateral through knee amputation, etc.
- C2: moderate hemiplegic or diplegic spasticity; moderate athetosis or ataxia; unilateral above knee amputation, etc.
- C3: moderate hemiplegic or diplegic spasticity; moderate athetosis or ataxia; bilateral below knee or unilateral through knee amputation, etc.

== Records ==
The following world and Paralympic Games records were current before competition commenced:

Women's C1 3000m Individual Pursuit
WR	4:10.941	Fran Brown	Great Britain	Glasgow	8 June 2023
PR	4:31.476	Qian Wangwei	China	Tokyo	25 Aug 2021
Women's C2 3000m Individual Pursuit
WR	3:51.721	Daphne Schrager	Great Britain	Glasgow	8 Feb 2023
PR	4:06.263	Zeng Sini	China	Tokyo	25 Aug 2021
Women's C3 3000m Individual Pursuit
WR	3:50.815	Paige Greco	Australia	Tokyo	25 August 2021
PR	3:50.815	Paige Greco	Australia	Tokyo	25 August 2021

== Schedule ==
All times are Central European Summer Time (UTC+2)

Date	Time	Round
29 August	12:55	Qualifying
29 August	16:24	Finals

== Results ==
=== Qualifying ===
Rank	Heat	Cyclist	Nation	Class	Result	Notes
1	4	Wang Xiaomei	China	C3	3:44.660	QG, WR
2	5	Daphne Schrager	Great Britain	C2	3:45.133	QG, WR
3	3	Maike Hausberger	Germany	C2	3:49.444	QB
4	4	Flurina Rigling	Switzerland	C2	3:50.347	QB
5	5	Keiko Sugiura	Japan	C3	3:53.549	
6	3	Anna Beck	Sweden	C3	3:59.993	
7	2	Rachael Timothy	Ireland	C3	4:05.247	
8	1	Daniela Munévar	Colombia	C2	4:14.667	
9	2	Qian Wangwei	China	C1	4:17.814	PR
10	1	Jyoti Gaderiya	India	C2	4:53.929	

=== Finals ===
Rank	Cyclist	Nation	Class	Result	Notes
Gold medal final
1st place, gold medalist(s)	Wang Xiaomei	China	C3	3:41.692	WR
2nd place, silver medalist(s)	Daphne Schrager	Great Britain	C2	3:51.129	
Bronze medal final
3rd place, bronze medalist(s)	Flurina Rigling	Switzerland	C2	3:48.512	
4	Maike Hausberger	Germany	C2	3:50.985	
