= Cycling at the 2020 Summer Paralympics – Women's individual pursuit C1–3 =

Women's individual pursuit C1–3 at the XVI Paralympic Games
- Venue: Izu Velodrome
- Dates: 25 August 2021
- Competitors: 15 from 11 nations

Medalists
1st place, gold medalist(s)		Paige Greco	Australia
2nd place, silver medalist(s)		Wang Xiaomei	China
3rd place, bronze medalist(s)		Denise Schindler	Germany

The women's individual pursuit class C1–3 track cycling event at the 2020 Summer Paralympics took place on 25 August 2021 at the Izu Velodrome, Japan. This class (C) is for the cyclist who has impairments that affect their legs, arms, and/or trunk but are still capable to use a standard bicycle. There will be 15 cyclists from 11 nations competing.

== Competition format ==
The competition begins with a qualifying round where the 15 cyclists are divided into 8 heats with 2 cyclists each except heat 1 which will only contain 1 cyclist; they compete on a time trial basis. The 2 fastest in the qualifying round would qualify to the gold medal final while the 3rd and 4th fastest will qualify to the bronze medal final. The distance of this event is 3000m. The event finals are held on the same day as the qualifying.

== Schedule ==
All times are Japan Standard Time (UTC+9)

Date	Time	Round
25 August	10:00	Qualifying
25 August	13:45	Finals

== Results ==
=== Qualifying ===
Rank	Heat	Nation	Cyclists	Class	Result	Notes
1	7	Australia	Paige Greco	C3	3:52.283	WR, QG
2	5	China	Wang Xiaomei	C3	3:55.781	QG
3	7	Germany	Denise Schindler	C3	3:57.625	QB
4	8	United States	Clara Brown	C3	4:00.183	QB
5	5	Japan	Keiko Sugiura	C3	4:02.834	
6	6	Sweden	Anna Beck	C3	4:03.035	
7	6	China	Zeng Sini	C2	4:06.263	WR
8	4	United States	Jamie Whitmore	C3	4:11.108	
9	3	Ireland	Richael Timothy	C3	4:11.699	
10	2	Colombia	Daniela Munévar	C2	4:12.080	
11	4	New Zealand	Sarah Ellington	C2	4:12.506	
12	8	Netherlands	Alyda Norbruis	C2	4:13.727	
13	3	Austria	Yvonne Marzinke	C2	4:29.147	
14	1	China	Qian Wangwei	C1	4:31.476	WR
15	2	Japan	Miho Fujii	C2	4:52.254	

=== Finals ===
Rank	Nation	Cyclists	Class	Result	Notes
Gold medal final
1st place, gold medalist(s)	Australia	Paige Greco	C3	3:50.815	WR
2nd place, silver medalist(s)	China	Wang Xiaomei	C3	3:54.975	
Bronze medal final
3rd place, bronze medalist(s)	Germany	Denise Schindler	C3	3:55.120	
4	United States	Clara Brown	C3	4:01.523	
