= Cycling at the 2020 Summer Paralympics – Women's road time trial C1–3 =

Women's road time trial C1–3 at the XVI Paralympic Games
- Venue: Fuji Speedway
- Dates: 31 August 2021
- Competitors: 14 from 11 nations
- Winning time: 25:55.76

Medalists
1st place, gold medalist(s)		Keiko Sugiura	Japan
2nd place, silver medalist(s)		Anna Beck	Sweden
3rd place, bronze medalist(s)		Paige Greco	Australia

The women's time trial class C1-3 road cycling event at the 2020 Summer Paralympics took place on 31 August 2021 at the Fuji Speedway, Japan. 14 riders from 11 nations competed in this event.

The event covers the following three classifications, that all use standard bicycles:

- C1: cyclists with severe hemiplegic or diplegic spasticity; severe athetosis or ataxia; bilateral through knee amputation, etcetera.
- C2: cyclists with moderate hemiplegic or diplegic spasticity; moderate athetosis or ataxia; unilateral above knee amputation, etcetera.
- C3: cyclists with moderate hemiplegic or diplegic spasticity; moderate athetosis or ataxia; bilateral below knee or unilateral through knee amputation, etcetera.

== Results ==
The event took place on 31 August 2021, at 8:55:

Rank	Rider	Nationality	Class	Real Time	Finish Time	Deficit
1st place, gold medalist(s)	Keiko Sugiura	Japan	C3	25:55.76	25:55.76	
2nd place, silver medalist(s)	Anna Beck	Sweden	C3	26:18.03	26:18.03	+22.27
3rd place, bronze medalist(s)	Paige Greco	Australia	C3	26:37.54	26:37.54	+41.78
4	Zeng Sini	China	C2	27:54.05	26:53.95	+58.19
5	Clara Brown	United States	C3	26:57.28	26:57.28	+1:01.52
6	Wang Xiaomei	China	C3	27:09.89	27:09.89	+1:14.13
7	Jamie Whitmore	United States	C3	27:20.48	27:20.48	+1:24.72
8	Daniela Munévar	Colombia	C2	28:59.26	27:56.82	+2:01.06
9	Denise Schindler	Germany	C3	28:44.33	28:44.33	+2:48.57
10	Sarah Ellington	New Zealand	C2	30:09.02	29:04.08	+3:08.32
11	Qian Wangwei	China	C1	31:42.32	29:18.31	+3:22.55
12	Elise Marc	France	C3	31:42.32	29:18.31	+3:37.16
13	Yvonne Marzinke	Austria	C2	31:43.53	30:35.19	+4:39.43
14	Richael Timothy	Ireland	C3	30:55.24	30:55.24	+4:59.48
15	Miho Fujii	Japan	C2	34:23.08	33:09.02	+7:13.26

Factors

C1 – 92.430
C2 – 96.410
C3 – 100.00
