= Cycling at the 2024 Summer Paralympics – Women's road race C1–3 =

Women's road race C1-3 at the XVII Paralympic Games
- Dates: 7 September 2024
- Competitors: 16 from 13 nations

Medalists
1st place, gold medalist(s)		Keiko Sugiura	Japan
2nd place, silver medalist(s)		Flurina Rigling	Switzerland
3rd place, bronze medalist(s)		Clara Brown	United States

The women's road race C1-3 cycling event at the 2024 Summer Paralympics took place on 7 September 2024. 16 riders competed in the event.

The event covers the following three classifications, that all use standard bicycles:

- C1: cyclists with severe hemiplegic or diplegic spasticity; severe athetosis or ataxia; bilateral through knee amputation, etcetera.
- C2: cyclists with moderate hemiplegic or diplegic spasticity; moderate athetosis or ataxia; unilateral above knee amputation, etcetera.
- C3: cyclists with moderate hemiplegic or diplegic spasticity; moderate athetosis or ataxia; bilateral below knee or unilateral through knee amputation, etcetera.

== Schedule ==
F	Finals

Women's Road Race
Event↓/Date →	5 September	6 September	7 September
B		F	
H1-4	F		
H5	F		
C1-3			F
C4-5		F	
T1-2			F

== Results ==
The event took place on 7 September 2024 at 9:48.

Rank	Rider	Nationality	Class	Time	Gap	Notes
1st place, gold medalist(s)	Keiko Sugiura	Japan	(C3)	1:38:48		s.t.
2nd place, silver medalist(s)	Flurina Rigling	Switzerland	(C2)	1:38:48	+0	s.t.
3rd place, bronze medalist(s)	Clara Brown	United States	(C3)	1:38:48	+0	s.t.
4	Anna Beck	Sweden	(C3)	1:38:49	+1	
5	Jamie Whitmore	United States	(C3)	1:39:10	+22	
6	Daphne Schrager	Great Britain	(C2)	1:43:14	+4:26	
7	Frances Brown	Great Britain	(C1)	1:43:17	+4:29	
8	Xiaomei Wang	China	(C3)	1:44:38	+5:50	
9	Maike Hausberger	Germany	(C2)	1:45:14	+5:50	
10	Daniela Munevar	Colombia	(C2)	1:45:44	+6:56	
11	Richael Timothy	Ireland	(C3)	1:48:47	+9:59	
12	Wangwei Qian	China	(C1)	1:56:28	+17:40	
13	Amanda Reid	Australia	(C2)	1:57:02	+18:14	
14	Sabrina Custodia	Brazil	(C2)	2:08:24	+29:36	
	Jyoti Gaderiya	India	(C2)	-1 LAP		

s.t. Same time
