= Cycling at the 2020 Summer Paralympics – Women's road race C1–3 =

Men's road race C1-3 at the XVI Paralympic Games
- Venue: Fuji Speedway
- Dates: 3 September 2021
- Competitors: 15 from 11 nations
- Winning time: 1:12:55

Medalists
1st place, gold medalist(s)		Keiko Sugiura	Japan
2nd place, silver medalist(s)		Anna Beck	Sweden
3rd place, bronze medalist(s)		Paige Greco	Australia

The women's road race C1-3 cycling event at the 2020 Summer Paralympics took place on 3 September 2021, at the Fuji Speedway in Shizuoka Prefecture. 15 riders competed in the event.

The event covers the following three classifications, that all use standard bicycles:

- C1: cyclists with severe hemiplegic or diplegic spasticity; severe athetosis or ataxia; bilateral through knee amputation, etcetera.
- C2: cyclists with moderate hemiplegic or diplegic spasticity; moderate athetosis or ataxia; unilateral above-knee amputation, etcetera.
- C3: cyclists with moderate hemiplegic or diplegic spasticity; moderate athetosis or ataxia; bilateral below-knee or unilateral through knee amputation, etcetera.

== Results ==
The event took place on 3 September 2021 at 9:35.

Rank	Rider	Nationality	Class	Time	Deficit
1st place, gold medalist(s)	Keiko Sugiura	Japan	C3	1:12:55	
2nd place, silver medalist(s)	Anna Beck	Sweden	C3	1:13:11	+0.16
3rd place, bronze medalist(s)	Paige Greco	Australia	C3	s.t.	
4	Wang Xiaomei	China	C3	s.t.	
5	Denise Schindler	Germany	C3	1:15:38	+2:43
6	Clara Brown	United States	C3	s.t.	
7	Jamie Whitmore	United States	C3	s.t.	
8	Daniela Munévar	Colombia	C2	s.t.	
9	Zeng Sini	China	C2	1:16:09	+3:14
10	Elise Marc	France	C3	1:17:42	+4:47
11	Richael Timothy	Ireland	C3	1:21:22	+8:27
12	Sarah Ellington	New Zealand	C2	1:21:23	+8:28
13	Qian Wangwei	China	C1	1:24:51	+11:56
14	Yvonne Marzinke	Austria	C2	1:25:42	+12:47
15	Miho Fujii	Japan	C2	1:37:24	+24:29
