= Cycling at the 2020 Summer Paralympics – Women's time trial C1–3 =

Women's time trial C1–3 at the XVI Paralympic Games
- Venue: Izu Velodrome
- Dates: 27 August 2021
- Competitors: 10 from 6 nations

Medalists
1st place, gold medalist(s)		Amanda Reid	Australia
2nd place, silver medalist(s)		Alyda Norbruis	Netherlands
3rd place, bronze medalist(s)		Qian Wangwei	China

The women's time trial class C1-3 track cycling event at the 2020 Summer Paralympics took place on 27 August 2021 at the Izu Velodrome, Japan. This combine class of (C1-3) under classification C is for cyclists who have impairments that affect their legs, arms, and/or trunk but are still capable to use a standard bicycle. Ten cyclists from six nations competed in this event.

== Competition format ==
The competition immediately began with the finals, where the 10 cyclists competed individually in their own heat by doing a time trial basis where the fastest cyclist won gold, the second fastest a silver, and the third fastest a bronze. The distance of this event was 500m. Cyclists may have had a different official time than their real-time due to this event being a combined class event (C1-3), and some cyclists in their own class may have a disadvantage over other classes (for example due to speed), thus athlete factor was used where those in C1 has 91.95, C2 92.45 and C3 100.00. The time cyclist from class C3 gets will be their official time while those in C1 and 2 can have it lesser due to the factor.

== Schedule ==
All times are Japan Standard Time (UTC+9)

Date	Time	Round
Friday, 27 August	10:00	Finals

== Records ==
Women's C1 500m Time Trial

World Record	Li Jieli (CHN)	43.430	Rio de Janeiro, Brazil	23 March 2018
Paralympic Record	Jayme Richardson (GBR)	45.449	London, United Kingdom	1 September 2012

Women's C2 500m Time Trial

World Record	Amanda Reid (AUS)	38.918	Brisbane, Australia	17 December 2020
Paralympic Record	Alyda Norbruis (NED)	39.631	Rio de Janeiro, Brazil	10 September 2016

Women's C3 500m Time Trial

World Record	Paige Greco (AUS)	39.442	Apeldoorn, Netherlands	15 March 2019
Paralympic Record	Megan Giglia (GBR)	41.252	Rio de Janeiro, Brazil	10 September 2016

== Results ==
Rank	Heat	Nation	Cyclists	Class	Real time	Factored time	Notes
1st place, gold medalist(s)	10	Australia	Amanda Reid	C2	38.487	35.581	WR
2nd place, silver medalist(s)	11	Netherlands	Alyda Norbruis	C2	39.002	36.057	
3rd place, bronze medalist(s)	2	China	Qian Wangwei	C1	41.403	38.070	WR
4	7	Japan	Keiko Sugiura	C3	39.869	39.869	PR
5	8	China	Wang Xiaomei	C3	40.825	40.825	
6	5	China	Zeng Sini	C2	44.637	41.267	
7	3	Japan	Miho Fujii	C2	45.112	41.706	
8	4	Austria	Yvonne Marzinke	C2	45.455	42.023	
9	1	Colombia	Daniela Munévar	C2	45.541	42.103	
10	6	Ireland	Richael Timothy	C3	42.485	42.485	
