= Cycling at the 2020 Summer Paralympics – Women's road time trial =

The women's road time trial cycling events at the 2020 Summer Paralympics took place on August 31 at Fuji Speedway, Oyama, Japan. There will be seven events taking place over twelve classifications. Four of those events, spanning multiple classifications were 'factored' events, with final times adjusted in line with classification to ensure fairness. All events (finals) are to be held on the same day on August 31.

== Classification ==
Cyclists are given a classification depending on the type and extent of their disability. The classification system allows cyclists to compete against others with a similar level of function. The class number indicates the severity of impairment with "1" being most impaired.

Cycling classes are:

- B: Blind and visually impaired cyclists use a Tandem bicycle with a sighted pilot on the front
- H 1–5: Cyclists with an impairment that affects their legs use a handcycle
- T 1–2: Cyclists with an impairment that affects their balance use a tricycle
- C 1–5: Cyclists with an impairment that affects their legs, arms, and/or trunk but are capable of using a standard bicycle

== Medal table ==
Rank	NPC	Gold	Silver	Bronze	Total
1	Germany	2	0	2	4
2	United States	2	0	0	2
3	Great Britain	1	2	0	3
4	Ireland	1	0	0	1
4	Japan	1	0	0	1
6	Australia	0	2	2	4
7	Sweden	0	1	1	2
8	China	0	1	0	1
8	Italy	0	1	0	1
10	Netherlands	0	0	1	1
10	Poland	0	0	1	1
Totals (11 entries)		7	7	7	21

== Medal summary ==
Classification	Gold		Silver		Bronze	
B	Ireland; Katie-George Dunlevy pilot: Eve McCrystal	47:32.07	Great Britain; Lora Fachie pilot: Corrine Hall	48:32.06	Sweden; Louise Jannering pilot: Anna Svärdström	49:36.06
H1-3	Annika Zeyen; Germany	32:46.97	Francesca Porcellato; Italy	33:30.52	Renata Kałuża; Poland	33:50.32
H4-5	Oksana Masters; United States	45:40.05	Sun Bianbian; China	47:26.53	Jennette Jansen; Netherlands	48:45.69
C1-3	Keiko Sugiura; Japan	25:55.76	Anna Beck; Sweden	26:18.03	Paige Greco; Australia	26:37.54
C4	Shawn Morelli; United States	39:33.79	Emily Petricola; Australia	39:43.09	Meg Lemon; Australia	41:14.42
C5	Sarah Storey; Great Britain	36:08.90	Crystal Lane-Wright; Great Britain	37:40.89	Kerstin Brachtendorf; Germany	38:34.49
T1-2	Jana Majunke; Germany	36:06.17	Carol Cooke; Australia	36:38.46	Angelika Dreock-Käser; Germany	36:53.88
