= Japan at the 2020 Summer Paralympics =

- Flag of Japan
- IPC code: JPN
- NPC: Japan Paralympic Committee

in Tokyo
- Competitors: 255 in 22 sports
- Flag bearers: Koyo Iwabuchi & Mami Tani
- Medals Ranked 11th: Gold 13 Silver 15 Bronze 23 Total 51

Summer Paralympics appearances (overview)
- 1964; 1968; 1972; 1976; 1980; 1984; 1988; 1992; 1996; 2000; 2004; 2008; 2012; 2016; 2020; 2024

Japan competed as the host nation of the 2020 Summer Paralympics in their capital Tokyo from 24 August to 5 September 2021.

== Medalists ==
Medal	Name	Sport	Event	Date
Gold	Takayuki Suzuki	Swimming	Men's 100 metre freestyle S4	26 August
Gold	Tomoki Sato	Athletics	Men's 400 metres T52	27 August
Gold	Naohide Yamaguchi	Swimming	Men's 100 metre breaststroke SB14	29 August
Gold	Tomoki Sato	Athletics	Men's 1500 metres T52	29 August
Gold	Keiko Sugiura	Cycling	Women's road time trial C1–3	31 August
Gold	Hidetaka Sugimura	Boccia	Mixed individual BC2	1 September
Gold	Keiko Sugiura	Cycling	Women's road race C1–3	3 September
Gold	Keiichi Kimura	Swimming	Men's 100 metre butterfly S11	3 September
Gold	Sarina Satomi	Badminton	Women's singles WH1	4 September
Gold	Shingo Kunieda	Wheelchair tennis	Men's singles	4 September
Gold	Daiki Kajiwara	Badminton	Men's singles WH2	5 September
Gold	Misato Michishita	Athletics	Women's marathon T12	5 September
Gold	Sarina Satomi; Yuma Yamazaki	Badminton	Women's doubles WH1–WH2	5 September
Silver	Miyuki Yamada	Swimming	Women's 100 metre backstroke S2	25 August
Silver	Uchu Tomita	Swimming	Men's 400 metre freestyle S11	26 August
Silver	Kenya Karasawa	Athletics	Men's 5000 metres T11	27 August
Silver	Hideki Uda	Paratriathlon	Men's PTS4	28 August
Silver	Takayuki Suzuki	Swimming	Men's 200 metre freestyle S4	30 August
Silver	Shinya Wada	Athletics	Men's 1500 metres T11	31 August
Silver	Keiichi Kimura	Swimming	Men's 100 metre breaststroke SB11	1 September
Silver	Miyuki Yamada	Swimming	Women's 50 metre backstroke S2	2 September
Silver	Takayuki Suzuki	Swimming	Men's 50 metre freestyle S4	2 September
Silver	Yuki Oya	Athletics	Men's 100 metres T52	3 September
Silver	Uchu Tomita	Swimming	Men's 100 metre butterfly S11	3 September
Silver	Yui Kamiji	Wheelchair tennis	Woman's Singles	3 September
Silver	Ayako Suzuki	Badminton	Women's singles SU5	4 September
Silver	Keisuke Kawamoto; Kazuki Takahashi; Keiko Tanaka	Boccia	Mixed pairs BC3	4 September
Silver	Japan men's national wheelchair basketball team: Akira Toyoshima; Renshi Chokai; Rin Kawahara; Takuya Furusawa; Ryuga Akaishi; Tetsuya Miyajima; Kiyoshi Fujisawa; Reo Fujimoto; Yoshinobu Takamatsu; Kei Akita; Takayoshi Iwai; Hiroaki Kozai	Wheelchair basketball	Men's tournament	5 September
Bronze	Takayuki Suzuki	Swimming	Men's 50 metre breaststroke SB3	25 August
Bronze	Shinya Wada	Athletics	Men's 5000 metres T11	27 August
Bronze	Yujiro Seto	Judo	Men's 66 kg	27 August
Bronze	Hirokazu Ueyonabaru	Athletics	Men's 400 metres T52	27 August
Bronze	Satoru Yoneoka; Guide: Kohei Tsubaki	Paratriathlon	Men's PTVI	28 August
Bronze	Maki Ito	Table tennis	Women's individual – Class 11	28 August
Bronze	Takayuki Suzuki	Swimming	Men's 150 metre individual medley SM4	28 August
Bronze	Japan national wheelchair rugby team: Masayuki Haga; Yuki Hasegawa; Katsuya Hashimoto; Yukinobu Ike; Daisuke Ikezaki; Tomoaki Imai; Kae Kurahashi; Shunya Nakamachi; Seiya Norimatsu; Hitoshi Ogawa; Shinichi Shimakawa; Hidefumi Wakayama	Wheelchair rugby	Mixed tournament	29 August
Bronze	Ogawa Kazusa	Judo	Women's 70 kg	29 August
Bronze	Hirokazu Ueyonabaru	Athletics	Men's 1500 metres T52	29 August
Bronze	Uchu Tomita	Swimming	Men's 200 metre individual medley SM11	30 August
Bronze	Mitsuteru Moroishi; Koji Sugeno	Wheelchair tennis	Quad doubles	1 September
Bronze	Japan women's national goalball team: Yuki Temma; Rie Urata; Eiko Kakehata; Norika Hagiwara; Rieko Takahasi; Haruka Wakasugi	Goalball	Women's tournament	3 September
Bronze	Uran Sawada; Kengo Oshima; Yuka Takamatsu; Tomoki Suzuki	Athletics	Mixed 4 × 100 metres relay	3 September
Bronze	Takumi Nakamura; Takayuki Hirose; Hidetaka Sugimura; Yuriko Fujii	Boccia	Mixed team BC1–2	4 September
Bronze	Yui Kamiji; Momoko Ohtani	Wheelchair tennis	Women's doubles	4 September
Bronze	Akiko Sugino	Badminton	Women's singles SU5	4 September
Bronze	Yuma Yamazaki	Badminton	Women's singles WH2	4 September
Bronze	Noriko Ito; Ayako Suzuki	Badminton	Women's doubles SL3–SU5	4 September
Bronze	Tadashi Horikoshi	Athletics	Men's marathon T12	5 September
Bronze	Tsutomu Nagata	Athletics	Men's marathon T46	5 September
Bronze	Daiki Kajiwara; Hiroshi Murayama	Badminton	Men's doubles WH1–WH2	5 September
Bronze	Daisuke Fujihara; Akiko Sugino	Badminton	Mixed doubles SL3–SU5	5 September

== Competitors ==
The following is the list of number of competitors participating in the Games:

Sport	Men	Women	Total
Archery	3	3	6
Athletics	26	20	46
Badminton	5	8	13
Boccia	7	3	10
Canoeing	3	3	6
Cycling	4	4	8
Equestrian	4	0	4
Football 5-a-side	10	0	10
Goalball	6	6	12
Judo	7	6	13
Powerlifting	3	1	4
Rowing	3	3	6
Shooting	2	1	3
Sitting volleyball	12	9	21
Swimming	14	13	27
Table tennis	7	4	11
Taekwondo	2	1	3
Triathlon	3	4	7
Wheelchair basketball	12	12	24
Wheelchair fencing	3	3	6
Wheelchair rugby	11	1	12
Wheelchair tennis	6	4	10
Total	153	109	262

== Archery ==
Japan fielded nine archers (four men and five women) at the Games, as the host nation is automatically entitled to use the individual quota places.

Men's individual

Athlete	Event	Ranking round		Round of 32	Round of 16	Quarterfinals	Semifinals	Final / BM	
Athlete	Event	Score	Seed	Opposition Score	Opposition Score	Opposition Score	Opposition Score	Opposition Score	Rank
Kohi Oyama	Individual W1	624	9	—N/a	Koo (KOR); W 129^{10+}-129^{10}	Türkmenoğlu (TUR); L 129-133	Did not advance		
Leon Miyamoto	Individual compound	683	17	Bonacina (ITA); W 141-136	He (CHN); L 139-146	Did not advance			
Tomohiro Ueyama	Individual recurve	609	11	Košťál (CZE); L 0-6	Did not advance				

Women's individual

Athlete	Event	Ranking round		Round of 32	Round of 16	Quarterfinals	Semifinals	Final / BM	
Athlete	Event	Score	Seed	Opposition Score	Opposition Score	Opposition Score	Opposition Score	Opposition Score	Rank
Aiko Okazaki	Individual W1	576	9	—N/a	Brandtlová (CZE); W 128-115	Chen (CHN); L 129-132	Did not advance		
Miho Nagano	Compound	647	22	Van Nest (CAN); L 130-138	Did not advance				
Chika Shigesada	Recurve	584	8	Bye	Gao (CHN); W 7-1	Wu (CHN); L 1-7	Did not advance		

Mixed team

Athlete	Event	Ranking round		Round of 32	Round of 16	Quarterfinals	Semifinals	Final / BM	
Athlete	Event	Score	Seed	Opposition Score	Opposition Score	Opposition Score	Opposition Score	Opposition Score	Rank
Aiko Okazaki; Kohji Oyama	Team W1	1200	4	—N/a		RPC (RPC); L 119-132	Did not advance		
Miho Nagano; Leon Miyamoto	Team compound	1330	10	—N/a	Italy (ITA); L 144-145	Did not advance			
Chika Shigesada; Tomohiro Ueyama	Team recurve	1193	6	—N/a	Brazil (BRA); W 5-3	Italy (ITA); L 2-6	Did not advance		

== Athletics ==
Japan have secured three quotas in athletics after being in the top four of the 2019 World Para Athletics Marathon Championships and twelve more automatic qualification slots at the 2019 World Para Athletics Championships.

Men's road & track

Athlete	Event	Heats		Final	
Athlete	Event	Result	Rank	Result	Rank
Daiki Akai	Men's 400m T20	—N/a		3:58.78	5
Masayuki Higuchi	Men's 1500 m T54	3:03.60	4 q	2:53.60	9
Masayuki Higuchi	Men's 5000 m T54	10:11.49	5 q	10:31.28	8
Tadashi Horikoshi	Men's marathon T12	—N/a		2:28:01	3rd place, bronze medalist(s)
Tomoki Ikoma	Men's 100m T54	14.50	6	Did not advance	
Kakeru Ishida	Men's 100m T47	11.15	5 q	11.05	5
Kakeru Ishida	Men's 400m T47	51.56	5	Did not advance	
Tomoya Ito	Men's 400m T53	57.16	6	Did not advance	
Yuku Iwata	Men's 1500m T20	—N/a		4:01.72	8
Kenya Karasawa	Men's 1500m T11	4:13.32	1 Q	4:08.84	4
Kenya Karasawa	Men's 5000m T11	—N/a		15:18.12	2nd place, silver medalist(s)
Junta Kosuda	Men's 100 m T63	13.58	5	Did not advance	
Kozo Kubo	Men's 5000 m T54	10:21.34	7	Did not advance	
Yutaka Kumagai	Men's marathon T12	—N/a		2:31:32	7
Takeru Matsumoto	Men's 100m T36	12.61	4	Did not advance	
Takeru Matsumoto	Men's 400m T36	—N/a		59.15	7
Tsutomu Nagata	Men's marathon T46	—N/a		2:29:33	3rd place, bronze medalist(s)
Kengo Oshima	Men's 100 m T64	11.41	5	Did not advance	
Kengo Oshima	Men's 200 m T64	23.99	4	Did not advance	
Yuki Oya	Men's 100m T52	—N/a		17.18	2nd place, silver medalist(s)
Tomoki Sato	Men's 400m T52	57.33	1 Q	55.39	1st place, gold medalist(s)
Tomoki Sato	Men's 1500m T52	—N/a		3:29.13	1st place, gold medalist(s)
Tomoki Suzuki	Men's 800m T54	1:37.85	5	Did not advance	
Tomoki Suzuki	Men's 1500 m T54	2:56.34	7 q	2:53.60	9
Tomoki Suzuki	Men's marathon T54	—N/a		1:30:45	7
Yuji Togawa	Men's 1500 m T20	—N/a		4:03.62	9
Hirokazu Ueyonabaru	Men's 400m T52	1:01.05	2 Q	59.95	3rd place, bronze medalist(s)
Hirokazu Ueyonabaru	Men's 1500 m T52	—N/a		3:44.17	3rd place, bronze medalist(s)
Shinya Wada	Men's 1500m T11	—N/a		4:05.27	2nd place, silver medalist(s)
Shinya Wada	Men's 5000m T11	—N/a		15:21.03	3rd place, bronze medalist(s)
Shinya Wada	Men's marathon T12	—N/a		2:33:05	9
Atsushi Yamamoto	Men's 100 m T63	13.20	5	Did not advance	
Yuhei Yasuono	Men's 100 m T33	—N/a		22.34	5

Men's field

Athlete	Event	Final	
Athlete	Event	Result	Rank
Kanta Kokubo	Men's long jump T20	7.01	4
Junta Kosuda	Men's javelin throw T46	5.95	7
Takuya Shiramasa	Men's high jump T64	58.35	6
Toru Suzuki	Men's high jump T64	1.88	5
Atsushi Yamamoto	Men's long jump T63	6.70	4
Akihiro Yamazaki	Men's javelin throw T46	57.69	7

Women's road & track

Athlete	Event	Heats		Semi-final		Final	
Athlete	Event	Result	Rank	Result	Rank	Result	Rank
Yumiko Fuji	Women's marathon T12	—N/a		—N/a		3:17:44	5
Tsubasa Kina	Women's marathon T54	—N/a		—N/a		1:42:33	7
Kaede Maegawa	Women's 100 m T63	16.57	4	—N/a		Did not advance	
Sayaka Makita	Women's 1500 m T20	4:54.60	6	—N/a		Did not advance	
Misato Michishita	Women's marathon T12	—N/a		—N/a		3:00:50	1st place, gold medalist(s)
Momoka Muraoka	Women's 100 m T54	17.10	4 q	—N/a		16.71	6
Mihoko Nishijima	Women's marathon T12	—N/a		—N/a		3:29:12	8
Mana Sasaki	Women's 100 m T13	12.96	4	—N/a		Did not advance	
Mana Sasaki	Women's 400 m T13	58.48	4 q	—N/a		58.05	7
Uran Sawada	Women's 100 m T12	12.71	2 q	12.81	4	Did not advance	
Chiaki Takada	Women's 100 m T11	13.66	3	Did not advance			
Saki Takakuwa	Women's 100 m T64	13.43	5	—N/a		Did not advance	
Yuka Takamatsu	Women's 100 m T38	14.00	6	—N/a		Did not advance	
Yuka Takamatsu	Women's 400 m T38	1:07.23	6	—N/a		Did not advance	
Ayumi Takamura	Women's 400 m T38	1:08.29	6	—N/a		Did not advance	
Aimi Toyoma	Women's 400 m T20	1:00.17	4 q	—N/a		59.99	7
Tomomi Tozawa	Women's 100 m T63	16.26	5 q	—N/a		16.48	8
Wakako Tschida	Women's marathon T54	—N/a		—N/a		1:38:32	4
Sae Tsuji	Women's 200 m T47	26.88	4	—N/a		Did not advance	
Sae Tsuji	Women's 200 m T47	59.98	3 Q	—N/a		58.98	5
Moeko Yamamoto	Women's 1500 m T20	—N/a		—N/a		4:55.03	7

Women's field

Athlete	Event	Final	
Athlete	Event	Result	Rank
Kaede Maegawa	Women's long jump T63	4.23	5
Maya Nakanishi	Women's long jump T64	5.27	6
Uran Sawada	Women's long jump T12	5.15	5
Chiaki Takada	Women's long jump T11	4.74	5
Saki Takakuwa	Women's long jump T64	4.88	8
Tomomi Tozawa	Women's long jump T63	4.39	4

== Badminton ==
Men

Athlete	Event	Group Stage				Quarterfinal	Semifinal	Final / BM	
Athlete	Event	Opposition Score	Opposition Score	Opposition Score	Rank	Opposition Score	Opposition Score	Opposition Score	Rank
Hiroshi Murayama	Singles WH1	Lee S-s (KOR); W (15–21, 21–13, 21–17)	Mi (GER); W (21–8, 21–7)	—N/a	1 Q	Nagashima (JPN); W (21–15, 21–16)	Qu (CHN); L (16–21, 11–21)	Lee D-s (KOR); L (20–22, 21–17, 14-21)	4
Osamu Nagashima	Singles WH1	Qu (CHN); L (9–21, 12–21)	Toupé (FRA); W (21–6, 21–12)	—N/a	2 Q	Murayama (JPN); L (15–21, 16–21)	Did not advance		
Daiki Kajiwara	Singles WH2	Jakobs (FRA); W (21–9, 21–5)	Chan (HKG); W (13–21, 21–12, 21–13)	—N/a	1 Q	Bye	Kim (KOR); W (21–14, 21–15)	Kim J-j (KOR); W (21–18, 21–19)	1st place, gold medalist(s)
Daisuke Fujihara	Singles SL3	Bethell (GBR); L (11–21, 7–21)	Rukaendi (INA); W (21–5, 21–18)	—N/a	2 Q	—N/a	Bhagat (IND); L (11–21, 16–21)	Sarkar (IND); L (20–22, 21–23)	4
Taiyo Imai	Singles SU5	Fang (TPE); L (16–21, 21–17, 10–21)	Eldakrory (EGY); W (21–5, 21–4)	Cheah (MAS); L (19–21, 12–21)	3	—N/a	Did not advance		
Hiroshi Murayama; Daiki Kajiwara	Doubles WH1–WH2	Mi / Wandschneider (GER); W (21–12, 21–9)	Qu / Mai (CHN); L (13–21, 10–21)	—N/a	2 Q	—N/a	Qu / Mai (CHN); L (8–21, 17–21)	Homhual / Junthong (THA); W (21–18, 21–19)	1st place, gold medalist(s)

Women

Athlete	Event	Group Stage			Quarterfinal	Semifinal	Final / BM	
Athlete	Event	Opposition Score	Opposition Score	Rank	Opposition Score	Opposition Score	Opposition Score	Rank
Sarina Satomi	Singles WH1	Kang (KOR); W (21–12, 21–7)	Yin (CHN); L (11–21, 22–24)	2 Q	Suter-Erath (SUI); W (21–8, 21–9)	Yin (CHN); W (21–18, 21–18)	Pookkham (THA); W (14–21, 21–19, 21-13)	1st place, gold medalist(s)
Yuma Yamazaki	Singles WH2	Lee S-a (KOR); W (22–20, 21–16)	Seçkin (TUR); L (15–21, 21–13, 16–21)	2 Q	Gureeva (RPC); W (23–25, 21–7, 21–8)	Xu (CHN); L (12–21, 13–21)	Seçkin (TUR); W (21–16, 21–8)	3rd place, bronze medalist(s)
Rie Ogura	Singles WH2	Xu (CHN); L (6–21, 8–21)	Wetwithan (THA); L (14–21, 17–21)	3	Did not advance			
Haruka Fujino	Singles SL4	Saensupa (THA); ~~W (21–17, 21–10)~~^{1}	Ma (CHN); L (25–27, 8–21)	2	—N/a	Did not advance		
Ayako Suzuki	Singles SU5	Kohli (IND); W (21–7, 21–4)	Bağlar (TUR); W (21–12, 21–8)	1 Q	Bye	Kameyama (JPN); W (21–2, 21–13)	Yang (CHN); L (17–21, 9–21)	2nd place, silver medalist(s)
Kaede Kameyama	Singles SU5	Sugino (JPN); L 1–2 (22–20, 15–21, 16–21)	Rosengren (DEN); W (22–20, 21–13)	2 Q	Kohli (IND); W (21–11, 21–15)	Yang (CHN); L (2–21, 13–21)	Sugino (JPN); L (16–21, 21–6, 13-21)	4
Akiko Sugino	Singles SU5	Kameyama (JPN); W (20–22, 21–15, 21–16)	Rosengren (DEN); W (15–21, 21–13, 21–15)	1 Q	Monteiro (POR); W (21–5, 21–12)	Suzuki (JPN); L (11–21, 11–21)	Kameyama (JPN); W (21–16, 6–21, 21-13)	3rd place, bronze medalist(s)
Sarina Satomi; Yuma Yamazaki	Doubles WH1–WH2	Kang / Lee S-a (KOR); W(21–12, 21–5)	Pookkham / Wetwithan (THA); W (21–16, 21–9)	1 Q	—N/a	Pookkham / Wetwithan (THA); W (21–17, 21–16)	Yin / Liu (CHN); W (16–21, 21–16, 21-13)	1st place, gold medalist(s)
Noriko Ito; Ayako Suzuki	Doubles SL3–SU5	Saensupa / Srinavakul (THA); W (21–11, 21–17)	Oktila / Sadiyah (INA); L (4–21, 8–21)	2 Q	—N/a	Cheng / Ma (CHN); L (6–21, 12–21)	Morin / Noël (FRA); W (21–16, 21–18)	3rd place, bronze medalist(s)

*^{1} Nipada Saensupa from Thailand retired during the match between Ma Huihui from China, though the result doesn't count.

Mixed

Athlete	Event	Group Stage			Semifinal	Final / BM	
Athlete	Event	Opposition Score	Opposition Score	Rank	Opposition Score	Opposition Score	Rank
Daisuke Fujihara; Akiko Sugino	Doubles SL3–SU5	Susanto / Oktila (INA); L (12–21, 11–21)	Pott / Seibert (GER); W (25–23, 21–11)	2 Q	Mazur / Noël (FRA); L (10–21, 11–21)	Bhagat / Kohli (IND); W (23–21, 21–19)	3rd place, bronze medalist(s)

== Boccia ==
Athlete	Event	Group Stage					Quarterfinal	Semifinal	Final / BM	
Athlete	Event	Opposition Score	Opposition Score	Opposition Score	Opposition Score	Rank	Opposition Score	Opposition Score	Opposition Score	Rank
Takumi Nakamura	Individual BC1	Ibarbure (ARG); W 8-5	Zhang (CHN); L 2-6	Sanchez Reyes (MEX); L 1-9	Smith (GBR); L 1-11	4	Did not advance			
Takayuki Hirose	Individual BC2	Valente (POR); W 7-2	Lam (HKG); L 1-6	Kurilak (SVK); W 4-3	—N/a	2	Did not advance			
Hidetaka Sugimura	Individual BC2	Tsypalina (RUS); W 12-0	Allard (CAN); W 6-4	Gonçalves (POR); W 6-1	—N/a	1 Q	Mezík (SVK); W 8-1	Santos (BRA); W 3-2	Vongsa (THA); W 6-1	1st place, gold medalist(s)
Keisuke Kawamoto	Individual BC3	Carvalho (BRA); W 4-2	Howon (KOR); L 5-5*	Tse (HKG); L 2-3	—N/a	3	Did not advance			
Kazuki Takahashi	Individual BC3	Polychronidis (GRE); L 2-7	Andrade (POR); W 9-0	Costa (POR); W 3-2	—N/a	2	Did not advance			
Shun Esaki	Individual BC4	Grisales (COL); L 2-4	McGuire (GBR); L 2-3	Wong (HKG); L 3-5	—N/a	4	Did not advance			
Takumi Nakamura; Yuriko Fujii; Hidetaka Sugimura; Takayuki Hirose	Team BC1–2	Slovakia; W 8-2	Portugal; W 5-4	South Korea; L 5-6	Brazil; W 6-4	1 Q	—N/a	Thailand; L 3-8	Portugal; W 4-3	3rd place, bronze medalist(s)
Kazuki Takahashi; Keisuke Kawamoto; Keiko Tanaka	Pairs BC3	Australia; W 3-2	Hong Kong; L 4-4*	Portugal; W 7-0	Brazil; W 3*-3	2 Q	—N/a	Greece; W 5-1	South Korea; L 4-4*	2nd place, silver medalist(s)

== Cycling ==
=== Road ===
Men

Athlete	Event	Result	Rank
Masaki Fujita	Road time trial C3	36:47.63	7
Masaki Fujita	Road race C1-3	2:11:06	7
Shota Kawamoto	Road time trial C2	39:08.26	9
Shota Kawamoto	Road race C1-3	2:28:51	28

Women

Athlete	Event	Result	Rank
Miho Fujii	Road time trial C1-3	33:09.02	15
Miho Fujii	Road race C1-3	1:37:24	15
Keiko Sugiura	Road time trial C1-3	25:55.76	1st place, gold medalist(s)
Keiko Sugiura	Road race C1-3	1:12:55	1st place, gold medalist(s)

=== Track ===
Men

Athlete	Event	Heats		Final	
Athlete	Event	Result	Rank	Result	Rank
Maski Fujita	Individual pursuit C3	3:38.366	8	Did not advance	
Maski Fujita	Time trial C1-3	—N/a		1:12.306	14
Shota Kawamoto	Individual pursuit C2	3:36.117	4	Liang (CHN); L 3:38.947	4
Shota Kawamoto	Time trial C1-3	—N/a		1:08.531	6

Women

Athlete	Event	Heats		Final	
Athlete	Event	Result	Rank	Result	Rank
Miho Fujii	Individual pursuit C1-3	4:52.254	15	Did not advance	
Miho Fujii	Time trial C1-3	—N/a		41.706	7
Keiko Sugiura	Individual pursuit C1-3	4:02.834	5	Did not advance	
Keiko Sugiura	Time trial C1-3	—N/a		39.869	4

== Equestrian ==
Athlete	Horse	Event	Result	Rank
Sho Iniba	Exclusive	Individual test grade III	67.529	15
Mitsuhide Miyaji	Charmander	Individual test grade II	66.824	7 Q
Mitsuhide Miyaji	Charmander	Individual freestyle test grade II	67.434	8
Katsuji Takashima	Huzette	Individual test grade IV	65.951	14
Sochie Yoshigoe	Hashtag	Individual test grade II	63.823	10
Mitsuhide Miyaji (GII); Sho Iniba (GIII); Katsuji Takashima (GIV)	See above	Team test	198.378	15

== Football 5-a-side ==
Roster

The following is the Japan squad in the football 5-a-side tournament of the 2020 Summer Paralympics.

No.	Pos.	Player	Class	Date of birth (age)
1	GK	Daisuke Satō	Sighted	17 June 1984 (aged 37)
2	DF	Hajime Teranishi	B1	23 May 1990 (aged 31)
3	MF	Robertoizumi Sasaki	B1	2 May 1978 (aged 43)
7	DF	Akihito Tanaka	B1	8 May 1978 (aged 43)
8	FW	Yasuhiro Sasaki	B1	20 November 1975 (aged 45)
9	FW	Satoru Hinata	B1	13 December 1984 (aged 36)
10	MF	Ryo Kawamura	B1	13 February 1989 (aged 32)
11	FW	Tomonari Kuroda	B1	9 October 1978 (aged 42)
13	GK	Masashi Kamiyama	Sighted	21 February 1994 (aged 27)
14	FW	Yuzuki Sonobe	B1	1 September 2003 (aged 17)

Group stage

Pos	Team	Pld	W	D	L	GF	GA	GD	Pts	Qualification
1	Brazil	3	3	0	0	11	0	+11	9	Semi finals
2	China	3	2	0	1	3	3	0	6	Semi finals
3	Japan	3	1	0	2	4	6	−2	3	5th–6th place match
4	France	3	0	0	3	0	9	−9	0	7th–8th place match

Source: TOCOG
29 August 2021
9:00

Japan	4–0	France
Kuroda 4', 9'; Kawamura 19', 27' (pen.)	Report

Aomi Urban Sports Park, Tokyo
Referee: Lucio Morgado (Brazil)

30 August 2021
11:30

Brazil	4–0	Japan
Nonato 5'; Tiago Paraná 25'; Ricardinho 36', 39'	Report

Aomi Urban Sports Park, Tokyo
Referee: Germinal Lubrano (Argentina)

31 August 2021
9:00

Japan	0–2	China
	Report	Zhu Ruiming 12', 18'

Aomi Urban Sports Park, Tokyo
Referee: François Carcouët (France)

Fifth place match

2 September 2021
11:30

Japan	1–0	Spain
Kuroda 20'	Report

Aomi Urban Sports Park, Tokyo
Referee: Rafael Gonzalez (Mexico)

== Goalball ==
Under goalball rules, as the host nation, Japan gets one of the ten slots for the men's, and women's, competitions. There are up to six athletes on the court at a time; three athletes per team are allowed on the court at one time.

=== Men ===
The following is the Japan roster in the men's goalball tournament of the 2020 Summer Paralympics.

No.	Player	Class	Date of birth (age)
1	Yuto Sano	B3	20 June 2002 (aged 19)
4	Yuji Taguchi	B2	16 February 1991 (aged 30)
5	Ryoga Yamaguchi	B1	5 January 1997 (aged 24)
7	Kazuya Kaneko	B3	8 February 2002 (aged 19)
8	Koji Miyajiki	B3	20 March 1995 (aged 26)
9	Yuta Kawashima	B2	24 September 1994 (aged 26)

Group stage

Pos	Team	Pld	W	D	L	GF	GA	GD	Pts	Qualification
1	Japan (H)	4	3	0	1	37	15	+22	9	Quarter-finals
2	Brazil	4	3	0	1	35	17	+18	9	Quarter-finals
3	United States	4	2	0	2	25	35	−10	6	Quarter-finals
4	Lithuania	4	1	1	2	24	31	−7	4	Quarter-finals
5	Algeria	4	0	1	3	20	43	−23	1	

Source: TOCOG
(H) Hosts

25 August 2021; 13:15	Algeria	4–13	Japan	Makuhari Messe, Tokyo; Referees: Bas Spaans (Netherlands), Woradet Kultawongwattana (Thailand)
25 August 2021; 13:15	Belhouchat 3 Larbi 1	Report	Kaneko 7 Miyajiki 3 Sano 2 Yamaguchi 1	Makuhari Messe, Tokyo; Referees: Bas Spaans (Netherlands), Woradet Kultawongwattana (Thailand)

27 August 2021; 13:15	Japan	11–1	United States	Makuhari Messe, Tokyo; Referees: Reza Dehghan (Iran), Woradet Kultawongwattana (Thailand)
27 August 2021; 13:15	Sano 6 Miyajiki 3 Kaneko 2	Report	Walker 1	Makuhari Messe, Tokyo; Referees: Reza Dehghan (Iran), Woradet Kultawongwattana (Thailand)

28 August 2021; 14:45	Lithuania	2–10	Japan	Makuhari Messe, Tokyo; Referees: Warrick Jackes (Australia), Bas Spaans (Netherlands)
28 August 2021; 14:45	Montvydas 1 Pavliukianec 1	Report	Sano 4 Miyajiki 3 Kaneko 2 Yamaguchi 1	Makuhari Messe, Tokyo; Referees: Warrick Jackes (Australia), Bas Spaans (Netherlands)

29 August 2021; 09:00	Japan	3–8	Brazil	Makuhari Messe, Tokyo; Referees: Reza Dehghan (Iran), Launel Scott (Canada)
29 August 2021; 09:00	Yamaguchi 2 Sano 1	Report	Sousa 5 Moreno 3	Makuhari Messe, Tokyo; Referees: Reza Dehghan (Iran), Launel Scott (Canada)

Quarter-final

31 August 2021; 13:15	Japan	4–7	China	Makuhari Messe, Tokyo; Referees: Reza Dehghan (Iran), Svitlana Moroz (Ukraine)
31 August 2021; 13:15	Miyajiki 4	Report	Yang Mingyuan 6 Cai Changgui 1	Makuhari Messe, Tokyo; Referees: Reza Dehghan (Iran), Svitlana Moroz (Ukraine)

=== Women ===
The following is the Japan roster in the women's goalball tournament of the 2020 Summer Paralympics.

No.	Player	Class	Date of birth (age)
1	Yuki Temma	B1	26 July 1990 (aged 31)
2	Rie Urata	B1	1 July 1977 (aged 44)
3	Eiko Kakehata	B3	19 February 1993 (aged 28)
6	Norika Hagiwara	B2	2 February 2001 (aged 20)
7	Rieko Takahashi	B1	20 March 1998 (aged 23)
8	Haruka Wakasugi	B1	23 August 1995 (aged 26)

Group stage

Pos	Team	Pld	W	D	L	GF	GA	GD	Pts	Qualification
1	Turkey	4	3	0	1	30	11	+19	9	Quarterfinals
2	United States	4	3	0	1	22	10	+12	9	Quarterfinals
3	Japan (H)	4	2	1	1	18	13	+5	7	Quarterfinals
4	Brazil	4	1	1	2	23	19	+4	4	Quarterfinals
5	Egypt	4	0	0	4	3	43	−40	0	

Source: TOCOG
Rules for classification: 1) points; 2) goal difference; 3) number of wins; 4) goals against; 5) head-to-head goal difference.
(H) Hosts
25 August 2021
14:45

Turkey	7–1	Japan
Sevd. Altunoluk 3', 11', 17', 21'; Güler 5', 20'; Yilmaz 21'	Report	Hagiwara 5'

Makuhari Messe, Tokyo
Referee: Svitlana Moroz (Ukraine), Raquel Aguado Gómez (Spain)

27 August 2021
10:30

Japan	4–4	Brazil
Temma 1'; Hagiwara 7', 10', 16'	Report	Custodio 14', 21'; Amorim 16', 21'

Makuhari Messe, Tokyo
Referee: Raquel Aguado Gómez (Spain), Svitlana Moroz (Ukraine)

28 August 2021
13:15

Japan	3–2	United States
Hagiwara 8', 11'; Wakasugi 17'	Report	Dennis 8', 19'

Makuhari Messe, Tokyo
Referee: Launel Scott (Canada), Woradet Kultawongwattana (Thailand)

29 August 2021
10:30

Egypt	0–10	Japan
	Report	Hagiwara 1', 1', 5', 6', 7', 8', 8'; Kakehata 1', 6', 7'

Makuhari Messe, Tokyo
Referee: Woradet Kultawongwattana (Thailand), Svitlana Moroz (Ukraine)

Quarterfinal

1 September 2021
15:00

Israel	1–4	Japan
Mahamid 13'	Report	Hagiwara 4', 5', 12', 23'

Makuhari Messe, Tokyo
Referee: Raquel Aguado Gómez (Spain), Warrick Jackes (Australia)

Semi-final

2 September 2021
15:00

Turkey	8–5	Japan
Sevd. Altunoluk 2', 3', 8', 10', 18', 18', 22', 23'	Report	Hagiwara 1', 1', 8', 18', 19'

Makuhari Messe, Tokyo
Referee: Raili Sipura (Finland), Romualdas Vaitiekus (Lithuania)

Bronze medal match

3 September 2021
13:15

Brazil	1–6	Japan
Amorim 22'	Report	Kakehata 2', 4', 12'; Hagiwara 4', 10', 20'

Makuhari Messe, Tokyo
Referee: Vaida Pokvytytė (Lithuania), Raili Sipura (Finland)

== Judo ==
Men

Athlete	Event	Round of 16	Quarterfinals	Semifinals	Repechage 1	Repechage 2	Final / BM	
Athlete	Event	Opposition Result	Opposition Result	Opposition Result	Opposition Result	Opposition Result	Opposition Result	Rank
Takaaki Hirai	−60 kg	Marques (BRA); W 10–01	Bologa (ROU); L 00–10	Did not advance	Bye	Çiftçi (TUR); L 00–10	Did not advance	=7
Yujiro Seto	−66 kg	Gauto (ARG); W 11–00	Kuranbaev (UZB); L 00–10	Did not advance	Bye	Mönkhbat (MGL); W 10–01	Gamjashvili (GEO); W 11–01	3rd place, bronze medalist(s)
Takamasa Nagai	−73 kg	Ramírez (ARG); W 10–00	Kutuev (RPC); L 00–10	Did not advance	Bye	Bareikis (LTU); L 01–11	Did not advance	=7
Aramitsu Kitazono	−81 kg	Solovey (UKR); WD	Did not advance					
Haruka Hirose	−90 kg	Chetouane (ALG); W 10–00	Latchoumanaya (FRA); L 00–10	Did not advance	Bye	Cavalcante (BRA); L 00–10	Did not advance	=7
Yoshikazu Matsumoto	−100 kg	Bye	Upmann (GER); L 00–10	Did not advance	Bye	Khalilov (UZB); L 00–10	Did not advance	=7
Kento Masaki	+100 kg	Bye	Chikoidze (GEO); L 00–10	Did not advance	Bye	Fernández (CUB); L 00–10	Did not advance	=7

Women

Athlete	Event	Round of 16	Quarterfinals	Semifinals	Repechage 1	Repechage 2	Final / BM	
Athlete	Event	Opposition Result	Opposition Result	Opposition Result	Opposition Result	Opposition Result	Opposition Result	Rank
Shizuka Hangai	−48 kg	Bye	Hajiyeva (AZE); L 00–10	Did not advance	Bye	Taşın (AZE); W 10–01	Ivanytska (UKR); L 00–11	=5
Yui Fujiwara	-52 kg	Bye	Safarova (AZE); W 10–00	Abdellaoui (ALG); L 00–10	Bye		Stepaniuk (RPC); L 00–10	=5
Junko Hirose	-57 kg	Bogdanova (BLR); W 10–00	Samandarova (UZB); L 00–11	Did not advance	Bye	González (ARG); W 10–00	Çelik (TUR); L 01–10	=5
Hiroko Kudo	-63 kg	Mutia (USA); W 10–00	Huseynova (AZE); L 00–10	Did not advance	Bye	Payno (ESP); L 00–10	Did not advance	=7
Hiroko Kudo	-70 kg	Paschalidou (GRE); W 10–00	Aliboeva (USA); W w/o	Kaldani (GEO); L 00-10	Bye		Zabrodskaia (RPC); W 01-00	3rd place, bronze medalist(s)
Minako Tsuchiya	+70 kg	—N/a	Emmerich (BRA); L 00-10	Did not advance	—N/a	Harnyk (UKR); L 00-10	Did not advance	=7

== Paracanoeing ==
Men

Athlete	Event	Heats		Semi-final		Final	
Athlete	Event	Time	Rank	Time	Rank	Time	Rank
Koichi Imai	Men's va'a VL3	58.458	5 SF	54.992	5 FB	57.028	10
Yuta Takagi	Men's kayak KL1	1:00.765	6 SF	58.259	5 FB	58.509	12
Hiromi Tatsumi	Men's kayak KL2	47.757	6 SF	46.290	5 FB	47.325	11

Women

Athlete	Event	Heats		Semi-final		Final	
Athlete	Event	Time	Rank	Time	Rank	Time	Rank
Yoshimi Kaji	Women's kayak KL3	55.777	5 SF	52.948	7	Did not advance	
Saki Komatsu	Women's va'a VL2	1:14.310	5 SF	1:08.477	4	Did not advance	
Monika Seryu	Women's kayak KL1	1:00.180	4 SF	1:00.489	2 FA	57.998	7

== Paratriathlon ==
Athlete	Event	Swim	Trans 1	Bike	Trans 2	Run	Total Time	Rank
Hideki Uda	Men's PTS4	12:52	1:11	30:30	0:52	18:20	1:03:45	2nd place, silver medalist(s)
Satoru Yoneoka; Guide: Kohei Tsubaki	Men's PTVI	11:49	1:22	29:34	0:54	18:40	1:02:20	3rd place, bronze medalist(s)
Jumpei Kimura	Men's PTWC	12:04	1:24	36:12	1:02	14:08	1:04:50	7
Wakako Tsuchida	Women's PTWC	15:48	1:45	42:03	1:14	17:38	1:22:32	9
Yukako Hata	Women's PTS2	11:55	2:16	41:30	1:53	30:23	1:28:04	6
Mami Tani	Women's PTS5	13:06	1:41	39:19	1:24	26:53	1:22:23	10
Atsuko Maruo; Guide: Hideki Kikuchi	Women's PTVI	14:01	1:28	34:29	1:02	26:07	1:20:59	11

== Powerlifting ==
Athlete	Event	Total lifted	Rank
Hiroshi Miura	Men's -49 kg	127	9
Tomihiro Kose	Men's -59 kg	145	10
Hajime Ujiro	Men's -72 kg	162	6
Chika Sakamoto	Women's -79 kg	80	8

== Rowing ==
Japan qualified two boats in the women's single sculls and mixed coxed four events for the games. Women's single sculls crews qualified by winning the gold medal at the 2021 FISA Asian & Oceanian Qualification Regatta in Tokyo, while mixed coxed four received the bipartite commission invitation allocation quotas.

Athlete	Event	Heats		Repechage		Final	
Athlete	Event	Time	Rank	Time	Rank	Time	Rank
Ichikawa Tomomi	Women's single sculls	13:50.29	5 R	12:41.10	5 FB	14:14.59	11
Yao Haruka; Kimura Yui; Nishioka Toshihiro; Ariyasu Ryohei; Tatsuta Hiroyuki;	Mixed coxed four	8:14.09	6 R	7:52.35	5 FB	8:36.89	12

Qualification Legend: FA=Final A (medal); FB=Final B (non-medal); R=Repechage

== Shooting ==
Mixed

Athlete	Event	Qualification		Final	
Athlete	Event	Score	Rank	Score	Rank
Daisuke Sasaki	R3 – 10 m air rifle standing SH1	629.4	28	Did not advance	
Yusuke Watanabe	R3 – 10 m air rifle standing SH1	623.0	45	Did not advance	
Yusuke Watanabe	R6 – 50 m air rifle standing SH1	610.1	30	Did not advance	
Mika Mizuta	R5 – 10 m air rifle standing SH2	628.6	32	Did not advance	

== Swimming ==
Five Japanese swimmers have qualified to compete in swimming at the 2020 Summer Paralympics via the 2019 World Para Swimming Championships slot allocation method.

Men

Athlete	Event	Heats		Final	
Athlete	Event	Result	Rank	Result	Rank
Kaede Hinata	Men's 50m freestyle S5	37.45	16	Did not advance	
Kaede Hinata	Men's 50m backstroke S5	41.97	10	Did not advance	
Kaede Hinata	Men's 50m butterfly S5	37.80	8 Q	37.24	7
Keiichi Kimura	Men's 100m backstroke SB11	1:14.05	3 Q	1:11.78	2nd place, silver medalist(s)
Keiichi Kimura	Men's 100m butterfly S11	1:02.25	1 Q	1:02.57	1st place, gold medalist(s)
Keiichi Kimura	Men's 200m individual medley SM11	2:32.60	3 Q	2:29.87	5
Takayuki Suzuki	Men's 50m freestyle S4	38.25	1 Q	37.70	2nd place, silver medalist(s)
Takayuki Suzuki	Men's 100m freestyle S4	1:27.48	2 Q	1:21.58	1st place, gold medalist(s)
Takayuki Suzuki	Men's 200m freestyle S4	3:03.47	2 Q	2:55.15	2nd place, silver medalist(s)
Takayuki Suzuki	Men's 50m breaststroke SB3	51.75	5 Q	49.32	3rd place, bronze medalist(s)
Takayuki Suzuki	Men's 150m individual medley SM4	2:45.77	3 Q	2:40.53	3rd place, bronze medalist(s)
Dai Tokairin	Men's 200m individual medley SM14	2:15.54	8 Q	2:11.29	4
Uchu Tomita	Men's 400m freestyle S11	4:35.77	2 Q	4:31.69	3rd place, bronze medalist(s)
Uchu Tomita	Men's 100m butterfly S11	1:03.32	2 Q	1:03.59	2nd place, silver medalist(s)
Uchu Tomita	Men's 200m individual medley SM11	2:32.87	4 Q	2:28.44	3rd place, bronze medalist(s)
Naohide Yamaguchi	Men's 100m breaststroke SB14	1:04.45	1 Q	1:03.77	1st place, gold medalist(s)

Women

Athlete	Event	Heats		Final	
Athlete	Event	Result	Rank	Result	Rank
Kasumi Fukui	Women's 100m backstroke S14	1:13.12	8 Q	1:12.58	7
Mami Inoue	Women's 100m butterfly S14	1:12.08	12	Did not advance	
Mami Inoue	Women's 200m individual medley SM14	2:36.60	7 Q	2:37.86	8
Tomomi Ishiura	Women's 50m freestyle S11	31.08	5 Q	30.85	7
Tomomi Ishiura	Women's 100m freestyle S11	1:13.76	8 Q	1:13.80	8
Moemi Kinoshita	Women's 100m butterfly S14	1:10.53	7 Q	1:10.25	7
Sakura Koike	Women's 400m freestyle S7	—N/a		5:34.12	6

== Table tennis ==
Japan as host nation, entered five athletes into the table tennis competition at the games. Takashi Asano qualified from 2019 ITTF Asian Para Championships which was held in Taichung, Taiwan and four others via World Ranking allocation.

Men

Athlete	Event	Group Stage				Round of 16	Quarterfinals	Semifinals	Final / BM	
Athlete	Event	Opposition Result	Opposition Result	Opposition Result	Rank	Opposition Result	Opposition Result	Opposition Result	Opposition Result	Rank
Nobuhiro Minami	Individual C2	Cha (KOR); L 2-3	Riapoš (SVK); L 0-3	—N/a	3	Did not advance				
Masachika Inoue	Individual C7	Pereira Stroh (BRA); L 2-3	Ballestrino (AUS); W 3-1	Youssef (EGY); L 0-3	3	Did not advance				
Katsuyoshi Yagi	Individual C7	Liao (CHN); L 0-3	Trtnik (SLO); W 3-0	—N/a	2 Q	Youssef (EGY); L 1-3	Did not advance			
Koyo Iwabuchi	Individual C9	Facey Thompson (GBR); W 3-2	Kats (UKR); L 1-3	Nozdrunov (RPC); L 2-3	3	Did not advance				
Takashi Asano	Individual C11	Von Einem (AUS); W 3-1	Kim G-t (KOR); L 1-3	—N/a	2 Q	Palos (HUN); L 2-3	Did not advance			
Koya Kato	Individual C11	Palos (HUN); L 1-3	Kim C-g (KOR); L 1-3	—N/a	3	Did not advance				
Takeshi Takemori	Individual C11	Van Acker (BEL); L 2-3	Martínez (VEN); W 3-0	—N/a	2 Q	Creange (FRA); L 0-3	Did not advance			
Masachika Inoue; Katsuyoshi Yagi	Team C6-7	—N/a				Brazil (BRA); L 0-2	Did not advance			

Women

Athlete	Event	Group Stage				Quarterfinals	Semifinals	Final / BM	
Athlete	Event	Opposition Result	Opposition Result	Opposition Result	Rank	Opposition Result	Opposition Result	Opposition Result	Rank
Yuri Tomono	Individual C8	Mao (CHN); L 0-3	Wolf (GER); W 3-2	—N/a	2 Q	Huang (CHN); L 0-3	Did not advance		
Nozomi Takeuchi	Individual C10	Partyka (POL); L 0-3	Demir (TUR); L 0-3	—N/a	3	Did not advance			
Kanami Furukawa	Individual C11	Kosmina (UKR); W 3-1	Ferney (FRA); L 0-3	Wong (HKG); L 1-3	3	Did not advance			
Maki Ito	Individual C11	Ng (HKG); L 1-3	Lysiak (POL); W 3-0	Prokofeva (RPC); L 0-3	2 Q	—N/a	Ferney (FRA); L 0-3	Did not advance	3rd place, bronze medalist(s)
Yuri Tomono; Nozomi Takeuchi	Team C9-10	—N/a				Poland (POL); L 0-2	Did not advance		

== Taekwondo ==
Japan as the host nation qualified three athletes to compete in three events at the Paralympics competition.

Athlete	Event	First round	Quarterfinals	Semifinals	Repechage 1	Repechage 2	Final / BM	
Athlete	Event	Opposition Result	Opposition Result	Opposition Result	Opposition Result	Opposition Result	Opposition Result	Rank
Mitsuya Tanaka	Men's –61 kg	Bye	Torquato (BRA); L 24–58	Did not advance	Khalilov (BRA); L 15–20	Did not advance		
Shunsuke Kudo	Men's –75 kg	Bye	Isaldibirov (RPC); L 23–31	Did not advance	Seye (SEN); W 52–31	Samorano (ARG); L 22–42	Did not advance	
Shoko Ota	Women's +58 kg	Bye	Naimova (UZB); L 12–37	Did not advance	Schiel (FRA); W WWD	Watson (AUS); L 12-32	Did not advance	

== Sitting volleyball ==
The women's sitting volleyball team finished in 10th place at the 2018 World ParaVolley Championships in the Netherlands but they hope to improve their volleyball skills before the home games.

Summary

Team	Event	Group stage				Semifinal	Final / BM / Cl.	
Team	Event	Opposition Score	Opposition Score	Opposition Score	Rank	Opposition Score	Opposition Score	Rank
Japan men's	Men's tournament	RPC; L 0–3	Egypt; L 0–3	Bosnia and Herzegovina; L 0–3	4	Did not advance	Seventh place match China; L 0–3	8
Japan women's	Women's tournament	Italy; L 0–3	Brazil; L 0–3	Canada; L 0–3	4	Did not advance	Seventh place match Rwanda; L 0–3	8

=== Men's tournament ===
Group play

Pos	Team	Pld	W	L	Pts	SW	SL	SR	SPW	SPL	SPR	Qualification
1	RPC (RPC)	3	3	0	3	9	0	MAX	225	151	1.490	Semifinals
2	Bosnia and Herzegovina	3	2	1	2	6	3	2.000	205	176	1.165	Semifinals
3	Egypt	3	1	2	1	3	6	0.500	193	174	1.109	Fifth place match
4	Japan	3	0	3	0	0	9	0.000	103	225	0.458	Seventh place match

Source: TOCOG

27 August 2021; 14:00 v	Japan	0–3	RPC (RPC)	Makuhari Messe, Tokyo; Referees: Khalid Shanishah (LBA), Christina Fiebich (USA)
27 August 2021; 14:00 v	(6–25, 17–25, 15–25); Results Statistics			Makuhari Messe, Tokyo; Referees: Khalid Shanishah (LBA), Christina Fiebich (USA)

29 August 2021; 18:30 v	Japan	0–3	Egypt	Makuhari Messe, Tokyo; Referees: Marie-Claude Richer (CAN), Huang Xiao (CHN)
29 August 2021; 18:30 v	(11–25, 7–25, 6–25); Results Statistics			Makuhari Messe, Tokyo; Referees: Marie-Claude Richer (CAN), Huang Xiao (CHN)

31 August 2021; 20:30 v	Bosnia and Herzegovina	3–0	Japan	Makuhari Messe, Tokyo; Referees: Barbara Pakuła (POL), Kim Jong-heun (KOR)
31 August 2021; 20:30 v	(25–13, 25–15, 25–13); Results Statistics			Makuhari Messe, Tokyo; Referees: Barbara Pakuła (POL), Kim Jong-heun (KOR)

Seventh place match

2 September 2021; 13:30 v	Japan	0–3	China	Makuhari Messe, Tokyo; Referees: Ute Fischer (GER), Vanessa Redes (BRA)
2 September 2021; 13:30 v	(14–25, 18–25, 19–25); Results Statistics			Makuhari Messe, Tokyo; Referees: Ute Fischer (GER), Vanessa Redes (BRA)

=== Women's tournament ===
Group play

Pos	Team	Pld	W	L	Pts	SW	SL	SR	SPW	SPL	SPR	Qualification
1	Brazil	3	3	0	3	9	3	3.000	289	237	1.219	Semifinals
2	Canada	3	2	1	2	8	4	2.000	278	243	1.144	Semifinals
3	Italy	3	1	2	1	5	6	0.833	227	232	0.978	Fifth place match
4	Japan (H)	3	0	3	0	0	9	0.000	143	225	0.636	Seventh place match

Source: TOCOG
(H) Host

27 August 2021; 10:00 v	Japan	0–3	Italy	Makuhari Messe, Tokyo; Referees: Toomas Murulo (EST), Ute Fischer (GER)
27 August 2021; 10:00 v	(23–25, 11–25, 10–25); Results Statistics			Makuhari Messe, Tokyo; Referees: Toomas Murulo (EST), Ute Fischer (GER)

29 August 2021; 20:30 v	Japan	0–3	Brazil	Makuhari Messe, Tokyo; Referees: Christina Fiebich (GER), Haris Helac (BIH)
29 August 2021; 20:30 v	(13–25, 16–25, 16–25); Results Statistics			Makuhari Messe, Tokyo; Referees: Christina Fiebich (GER), Haris Helac (BIH)

1 September 2021; 20:30 v	Canada	3–0	Japan	Makuhari Messe, Tokyo; Referees: Huang Xiao (CHN), Sari Mannersuo (FIN)
1 September 2021; 20:30 v	(25–19, 25–15, 25–20); Results Statistics			Makuhari Messe, Tokyo; Referees: Huang Xiao (CHN), Sari Mannersuo (FIN)

Seventh place match

3 September 2021; 13:30 v	Japan	0–3	Rwanda	Makuhari Messe, Tokyo; Referees: Sari Mannersuo (FIN), Barbara Pakuła (POL)
3 September 2021; 13:30 v	(19–25, 21–25, 22–25); Results Statistics			Makuhari Messe, Tokyo; Referees: Sari Mannersuo (FIN), Barbara Pakuła (POL)

== Wheelchair basketball ==
=== Men's tournament ===
Roster

The following is the Japan roster in the men's wheelchair basketball tournament of the 2020 Summer Paralympics.

Japan men's national wheelchair basketball team - 2020 Summer Paralympics roster
Players
Coaches

No.	Name	Age – Date of birth	Pts.
1	Akira Toyoshima	32 – 16 February 1989	2.0
2	Renshi Chokai	22 – 2 February 1999	2.5
6	Rin Kawahara	24 – 3 December 1996	1.5
7	Takuya Furusawa	25 – 8 May 1996	3.0
8	Ryuga Akaishi	20 – 11 September 2000	2.5
10	Tetsuya Miyajima	32 – 29 November 1988	4.0
11	Kiyoshi Fujisawa	35 – 26 July 1986	2.0
13	Reo Fujimoto	37 – 22 September 1983	4.5
21	Yoshinobu Takamatsu	21 – 20 November 1999	4.0
25	Kei Akita	31 – 22 February 1990	3.5
26	Takayoshi Iwai	25 – 28 June 1996	1.0
55	Hiroaki Kozai	33 – 14 July 1988	3.5

Head coach

Kazuyuki Kyoya

Assistant coach(es)

Shimpei Oikawa

Legend

- Age - describes age on 24 August 2021

Group stage

Pos	Team	Pld	W	L	PF	PA	PD	Pts	Qualification
1	Spain	5	5	0	375	272	+103	10	Quarter-finals
2	Japan (H)	5	4	1	312	298	+14	9	Quarter-finals
3	Turkey	5	3	2	353	327	+26	8	Quarter-finals
4	Canada	5	2	3	307	333	−26	7	Quarter-finals
5	South Korea	5	1	4	305	332	−27	6	9th/10th place playoff
6	Colombia	5	0	5	256	346	−90	5	11th/12th place playoff

Source: TOCOG
Rules for classification: 1) Points; 2) Head-to-head results; 3) Points difference; 4) Points scored.
(H) Hosts

26 August 2021
20:30

Report

Colombia	56–63	Japan
Scoring by quarter: 15–24, 13–12, 15–15, 13–12
Pts: Hernandez 21; Rebs: Diaz, Hernandez 8 Asts: Leep 6		Pts: Akita 24; Rebs: Chokai 17; Asts: Chokai 10

Musashino Forest Sport Plaza
Attendance: 40
Referees: Yap Poh Boon

28 August 2021
20:30

Report

South Korea	66–54	Colombia
Scoring by quarter: 19–10, 16–17, 18–10, 13–17
Pts: Lee C. 14; Rebs: Lee Y. 13; Asts: Oh 11		Pts: Hernandez 21; Rebs: Sanz 8 Asts: Hernandez 9

Musashino Forest Sport Plaza
Attendance: 0
Referees: Hiroki Ono

29 August 2021
20:30

Report

Spain	79–61	Japan
Scoring by quarter: 22–18, 26–12, 12–17, 19–14
Pts: García 27; Rebs: García 12; Asts: García 17		Pts: Furusawa 15; Rebs: Chokai, Fujimoto 5 Asts: Akaishi 5

Ariake Arena
Referees: Mauricio Gamez

30 August 2021
14:45

Report

Turkey	55–67	Japan
Scoring by quarter: 12–9, 15–19, 17–17, 11–22
Pts: Toprak 17; Rebs: Gürbulak 9 Asts: Gürbulak 6		Pts: Kozai 22; Rebs: Chokai 14; Asts: Chokai 8

Ariake Arena
Referees: Gustavo Mathias

Quarter-final

1 September 2021
20:45

Report

Japan	61–55	Australia
Scoring by quarter: 14–14, 21–16, 12–9, 14–16
Pts: Kozai 20; Rebs: Chokai 12; Asts: Chokai 9		Pts: O'Neill-Thorne 18; Rebs: Auprince, O'Neill-Thorne 5 Asts: O'Neill-Thorne 7

Ariake Arena
Attendance: 190
Referees: Darrell Hargreaves

Semi-final

3 September 2021
20:45

Report

Japan	79–68	Great Britain
Scoring by quarter: 15–23, 18–13, 19–12, 27–20
Pts: Chokai 20; Rebs: Chokai 8 Asts: Chokai 8		Pts: Choudhry 26; Rebs: Manning 7 Asts: Choudhry 11

Ariake Arena
Attendance: 347
Referees: Darrell Hargreaves

Gold medal match

5 September 2021
12:30

Report

(gold) United States	64–60	Japan (silver)
Scoring by quarter: 18–18, 14–9, 13–19, 19–14
Pts: Serio 28; Rebs: Bell, Williams 7 Asts: Serio 9		Pts: Kozai 18; Rebs: Chokai 18; Asts: Kozai 5

Ariake Arena
Attendance: 62
Referees: Juan Urunuela

=== Women's tournament ===
Roster

The following is the Japan roster in the women's wheelchair basketball tournament of the 2020 Summer Paralympics.

Japan women's national wheelchair basketball team - 2020 Summer Paralympics roster
Players
Coaches

No.	Name	Age – Date of birth	Pts.
2	Izumi Zaima	24 – 4 December 1996	1.0
4	Amane Yanagimoto	23 – 4 August 1998	2.5
5	Miki Hirai	39 – 10 September 1981	2.5
7	Mayumi Tsuchida	44 – 11 March 1977	4.0
10	Mayo Hagino	28 – 9 March 1993	1.5
12	Ikumi Fujii	38 – 2 November 1982	4.0
14	Chinami Shimizu	38 – 8 November 1982	3.0
15	Mari Amimoto	32 – 15 November 1988	4.5
18	Chihiro Kitada	32 – 12 January 1989	4.5
19	Yui Kitama	26 – 6 October 1994	1.0
22	Emi Yasuo	28 – 10 June 1993	2.0
88	Rie Odajima	32 – 1 April 1989	2.5

Head coach

Yoshiaki Iwasa

Assistant coach(es)

Kaori Tachibana, Sayaka Yamasaki

Legend

- Age - describes age on 24 August 2021

Group stage

Pos	Team	Pld	W	L	PF	PA	PD	Pts	Qualification
1	Germany	4	4	0	248	204	+44	8	Quarter-finals
2	Canada	4	3	1	267	185	+82	7	Quarter-finals
3	Japan (H)	4	2	2	216	215	+1	6	Quarter-finals
4	Great Britain	4	1	3	212	218	−6	5	Quarter-finals
5	Australia	4	0	4	180	301	−121	4	9th/10th place playoff

Source: TOCOG
Rules for classification: 1) Points; 2) Head-to-head results; 3) Points difference; 4) Points scored.
(H) Hosts

25 August 2021
17:00

Report

Australia	47–73	Japan
Scoring by quarter: 14–16, 14–18, 11–18, 8–21
Pts: Merritt 18; Rebs: Merritt 19; Asts: Merritt 4		Pts: Kitada 16; Rebs: Amimoto 11; Asts: Amimoto 11

Musashino Forest Sport Plaza
Referees: Celine Villard

27 August 2021
9:00

Report

Canada	61–35	Japan
Scoring by quarter: 13–8, 18–6, 20–11, 10–10
Pts: Dandeneau 19; Rebs: Ouellet, Young 10; Asts: Young 6		Pts: Fujii 10; Rebs: Amimoto 8 Asts: Amimoto 5

Ariake Arena
Referees: Hsieh Shu-fei

27 August 2021
20:30

Report

Great Britain	35–53	Germany
Scoring by quarter: 7–18, 10–12, 4–8, 14–15
Pts: Love 8 Rebs: Love 8 Asts: Freeman 6		Pts: Miller 21; Rebs: Miller 18; Asts: Lang 9

Musashino Forest Sport Plaza
Referees: Shunsuke Nikaido

29 August 2021
11:15

Report

Japan	54–59	Germany
Scoring by quarter: 12–9, 14–13, 16–15, 12–22
Pts: Fujii 16; Rebs: Amimoto 8 Asts: Amimoto, Hagino 4		Pts: Lang 27; Rebs: Lang 17; Asts: Lang 8

Ariake Arena
Referees: Gustavo Mathias

Quarter-final

31 August 2021
20:45

Report

Netherlands	82–24	Japan
Scoring by quarter: 28–6, 18–6, 20–8, 16–4
Pts: Beijer 38; Rebs: Kramer 17; Asts: Kramer 9		Pts: four players 4 Rebs: Kitada 6 Asts: Amimoto 4

Ariake Arena
Referees: Sebastien Gauthier

5th–6th classification playoff

3 September 2021
15:00

Report

Canada	68–49	Japan
Scoring by quarter: 22–4, 16–13, 19–14, 11–18
Pts: Lalonde 20; Rebs: Young 13; Asts: Young 8		Pts: Kitada 20; Rebs: Kitada 8 Asts: Fujii 7

Ariake Arena
Referees: Geghard Tahmasian

== Wheelchair rugby ==
Japan national wheelchair rugby team qualified for the Games automatically as the host nation quotas.

Team roster

- Team event – 1 team of 12 player

Squad	Group stage				Semifinal	Final	Rank
Squad	Opposition Result	Opposition Result	Opposition Result	Rank	Opposition Result	Opposition Result	Rank
Japan national team	France; W 53–51	Australia; W 60–51	Denmark; W 57–53	1	Great Britain; L 49–55	Australia; W 60–52	3rd place, bronze medalist(s)

Group stage

Pos	Team	Pld	W	D	L	GF	GA	GD	Pts	Qualification
1	Japan (H)	3	3	0	0	170	155	+15	6	Semi-finals
2	Australia	3	1	0	2	156	159	−3	2	Semi-finals
3	France	3	1	0	2	151	153	−2	2	Fifth place Match
4	Denmark	3	1	0	2	155	165	−10	2	Seventh place Match

Source: Tokyo2020
(H) Hosts
25 August 2021
20:00

Japan	53–51	France

Yoyogi National Stadium, Tokyo

26 August 2021
12:45

Japan	60–51	Denmark

Yoyogi National Stadium, Tokyo

27 August 2021
12:45

Australia	53–57	Japan

Yoyogi National Stadium, Tokyo

Semi-final

28 August 2021
20:00

Japan	49–55	Great Britain

Yoyogi National Stadium, Tokyo

Bronze medal match

29 August 2021
20:00

Japan	60–52	Australia

Yoyogi National Stadium, Tokyo

== Wheelchair tennis ==
Japan qualified twelve players entries for wheelchair tennis. Shingo Kunieda and Yui Kamiji qualified by winning the gold medal at the 2018 Asian Para Games in Jakarta. Meanwhile ten other athletes qualified by world rankings.

Athlete	Event	Round of 64	Round of 32	Round of 16	Quarterfinals	Semifinals	Final / BM	
Athlete	Event	Opposition Result	Opposition Result	Opposition Result	Opposition Result	Opposition Result	Opposition Result	Rank
Daisuke Arai	Men's singles	Sasson (ISR); W 6-1, 6-1	Olsson (SWE); L 0-6, 2-6	Did not advance				
Shingo Kunieda	Men's singles	—N/a	Gergely (ISR); W 6-0, 6-1	Ji (CHN); W 6-0, 6-1	Houdet (FRA); W 7-6, 6-3	Reid (GBR); W 6-3, 6-2	Egberink (NED); W 6-1, 6-2	1st place, gold medalist(s)
Takuya Miki	Men's singles	Siscar Meseguer (ESP); W 6-1, 6-2	Casco (ARG); W 6-3, 6-1	Peifer (FRA); L 2-6, 3-6	Did not advance			
Takashi Sanada	Men's singles	Anker (NED); W 6-1, 6-1	Im (KOR); W 6-2, 6-1	Reid (GBR); L 2-6, 1-6	Did not advance			
Daisuke Arai; Takuya Miki	Men's doubles	—N/a	Khlongrua / Suwan (THA); W 7-6, 6-3	Fernández / Ledesma (ARG); L 7-6, 6-3	Did not advance			
Shingo Kunieda; Takashi Sanada	Men's doubles	—N/a	Bye	Cattanéo / Menguy (FRA); W 6-1, 6-1	Anker / Spaargaren (NED); W 7-6, 6-3	Hewett / Reid (GBR); L 2-6, 1-6	Egberink / Scheffers (NED); L 3-6, 2-6	4
Yui Kamiji	Women's singles	—N/a	Moreno (ARG); W 6-0, 6-1	Duval (BRA); W 6-0, 6-0	Zhu (CHN); W 7-5, 6-1	van Koot (NED); W 6-2, 6-2	de Groot (NED); L 3-6, 6-7	2nd place, silver medalist(s)
Momoko Ohtani	Women's singles	—N/a	Venter (RSA); W 6-1, 6-2	Lvova (RPC); W 7-5, 6-1	de Groot (NED); L 3-6, 2-6	Did not advance		
Saki Takamuro	Women's singles	—N/a	Montjane (RSA); L 2-6, 1-6	Did not advance				
Manami Tanaka	Women's singles	—N/a	Awane (MAR); W 6-1, 6-2	Whiley (GBR); L 1-6, 0-6	Did not advance			
Yui Kamiji; Momoko Ohtani	Women's doubles	—N/a		Bye	Huang H / Huang J (CHN); W 6-0, 6-0	de Groot / van Koot (NED); L 4-6, 2-6	Wang / Zhu (CHN); W 6-2, 7-6	3rd place, bronze medalist(s)
Saki Takamuro; Manami Tanaka	Women's doubles	—N/a		Bye	Wang / Zhu (CHN); L 2-6, 1-6	Did not advance		
Mitsuteru Moroishi	Quad singles	—N/a		Alcott (AUS); L 6-0, 6-2	Did not advance			
Koji Sugeno	Quad singles	—N/a		Kim (KOR); W 6-0, 6-0	Wagner (USA); W 6-4, 6-2	Schröder (NED); L 2-6, 3-6	Vink (NED); L 1-6, 4-6	4
Mitsuteru Moroishi; Koji Sugeno	Quad doubles	—N/a			Saadon / Weinberg (ISR); W 7-5, 6-2	Alcott / Davidson (AUS); L 2-6, 4-6	Cotterill / Lapthorne (GBR); W 7-5, 3-6, 7-5	3rd place, bronze medalist(s)

== See also ==
- Japan at the Paralympics
- Japan at the 2020 Summer Olympics
