= Richael Timothy =

Irish para cyclist

Personal information
- Home town: Ballymoe, County Galway

Sport
- Country: Ireland
- Sport: Para-cycling
- Disability class: C3
- Club: Castlerea Cycling Club
Medal record
Representing Ireland
Women's para cycling
Track World Championships
Bronze medal – third place	2020 Milton	Scratch Race
Bronze medal – third place	2023 Glasgow	Scratch Race
Bronze medal – third place	2023 Glasgow	Omnium
Road European Championships
Gold medal – first place	2026 Maniago	Road Race
Bronze medal – third place	2026 Maniago	Time Trial

Richael Timothy is an Irish para-cyclist. She has represented Ireland at the 2020 and 2024 Summer Paralympics. She has won three bronze medals at the UCI Para-cycling Track World Championships, and became the road race champion in the women's C3 category at the 2026 UEC Para-cycling European Championships.

== Early and personal life ==
Richael Timothy is from Ballymoe from County Galway. During her teenage years, she played association football, and represented the Republic of Ireland at under-15 and under-17 level. She also played inter-county Gaelic football for Roscommon as a goalkeeper.

At the age of 21, Timothy was forced to retire from football due to hereditary haemorrhagic telangiectasia (HHT), a rare vascular disorder. Following treatment, she suffered an acquired brain injury in 2016 which left her with only 30% strength in her right arm and leg.

Timothy identifies as LGBTQ, and is married to Jennifer Downey, who is a physiotherapist.

== Career ==
After her acquired brain injury, Timothy turned to indoor cycling as a means of rehabilitation and took up para-cycling based on her doctor's recommendation in 2017. She joined Cycling Ireland's development programme. She quickly progressed through the para-cycling ranks, and made her international debut for Ireland in 2017. She won her first international medal at an Manchester Para-Cycling International, securing a silver medal in the Scratch Race.

Timothy won a bronze medal in the Scratch Race at the 2020 UCI Para-cycling Track World Championships held in Milton. She finished fourth in the Road Race and fifth in the Time Trial at the 2021 UCI Para-cycling Road World Championships. She became the Irish national champion in the Time Trial event in 2021. She represented Ireland at the 2020 Summer Paralympics in Tokyo. She competed in four events: the women's individual pursuit C1–3, women's time trial C1–3, women's road time trial C1–3, and women's road race C1–3. Her best result was ninth place in the individual pursuit.

Timothy won two bronze medals at the 2023 UCI Para-cycling Track World Championships held in Glasgow. She finished third in the Scratch Race and Omnium in the C3 classification. She represented Ireland at the 2024 Summer Paralympics in Paris. She competed in four events: the women's individual pursuit C1–3, women's time trial C1–3, women's road time trial C1–3, and women's road race C1–3. Her best result was seventh place in the individual pursuit event.

In June 2026, Timothy won a gold medal in the Road Race and a bronze medal in the Time Trial event in the women's C3 category at the UEC Para-cycling European Road Championships in Italy.
