= Athletics at the 2020 Summer Paralympics – Men's 1500 metres T52 =

Men's 1500 metres T52 at the XVI Paralympic Games
- Venue: Tokyo National Stadium
- Dates: 29 August 2021 (final)
- Competitors: 7 from 5 nations
- Winning time: 3:29.13

Medalists
| 1st place, gold medalist(s) | | Tomoki Sato | Japan |
| 2nd place, silver medalist(s) | | Raymond Martin | United States |
| 3rd place, bronze medalist(s) | | Hirokazu Ueyonabaru | Japan |

The men's 1500 metres T52 event at the 2020 Summer Paralympics in Tokyo took place on 29 August 2021.

The T52 category is for wheelchair athletes with damage to spinal cord in the higher parts of the back, substantially impaired or no trunk function, and minimal or no leg function. Pushing power comes from elbow extensions, and appears close to normal except for use of modified gloves to compensate for grip.

== Records ==
Prior to the competition, the existing records were as follows:

| World Record | Tomoki Sato (JPN) | 3:25.08 | Machida, Japan | 1 July 2018 |
| Paralympic Record | Raymond Martin (USA) | 3:40.63 | Rio de Janeiro, Brazil | 15 September 2016 |

| Area | Time | Athlete | Nation |
|---|---|---|---|
| Africa | Vacant | | |
| America | 3:29.79 | Raymond Martin | United States |
| Asia | 3:25.08 WR | Tomoki Sato | Japan |
| Europe | 3:36.04 | Santiago Sanz | Spain |
| Oceania | 3:59.15 | Lachlan Jones | Australia |

== Results ==
The final took place on 29 August 2021, at 20:42:

| Rank | Athlete | Nation | Time | Notes |
|---|---|---|---|---|
| 1st place, gold medalist(s) | Tomoki Sato | Japan | 3:29.13 | GR |
| 2nd place, silver medalist(s) | Raymond Martin | United States | 3:29.72 | AR |
| 3rd place, bronze medalist(s) | Hirokazu Ueyonabaru | Japan | 3:44.17 | PB |
| 4 | Thomas Geierspichler | Austria | 3:54.77 | SB |
| 5 | Leonardo De Jesus Perez Juarez | Mexico | 3:54.82 | SB |
| 6 | Jerrold Mangliwan | Philippines | 3:58.24 | PB |
| 7 | Isaiah Rigo | United States | 3:59.42 | |
