= Cycling at the 2024 Summer Paralympics – Women's road time trial =

The women's road time trial cycling events at the 2024 Summer Paralympics took place on 4 September at Clichy-sous-Bois, Paris. Seven events took place over twelve classifications. The T1-2, H1-3, H4-5 and C1-3 time trials, all races which took in multiple classifications, were 'factored' events, with times adjusted by classification to allow fair competition. All events (finals) were held on the same day (4 September).

== Classification ==
Cyclists are given a classification depending on the type and extent of their disability. The classification system allows cyclists to compete against others with a similar level of function. The class number indicates the severity of impairment with "1" being most impaired.

Cycling classes are:

- B: Blind and visually impaired cyclists use a Tandem bicycle with a sighted pilot on the front
- H 1–5: Cyclists with an impairment that affects their legs use a handcycle
- T 1–2: Cyclists with an impairment that affects their balance use a tricycle
- C 1–5: Cyclists with an impairment that affects their legs, arms, and/or trunk but are capable of using a standard bicycle

== Medal table ==
* Host nation (France)

| Rank | NPC | Gold | Silver | Bronze | Total |
|---|---|---|---|---|---|
| 1 | United States | 3 | 0 | 0 | 3 |
| 2 | Great Britain | 1 | 2 | 1 | 4 |
| 3 | Netherlands | 1 | 1 | 0 | 2 |
| 4 | Germany | 1 | 0 | 1 | 2 |
| 5 | Ireland | 1 | 0 | 0 | 1 |
| 6 | Australia | 0 | 2 | 1 | 3 |
| 7 | Switzerland | 0 | 1 | 1 | 2 |
| 8 | France* | 0 | 1 | 0 | 1 |
| 9 | China | 0 | 0 | 1 | 1 |
| 9 | Denmark | 0 | 0 | 1 | 1 |
| 9 | Sweden | 0 | 0 | 1 | 1 |
| Totals (11 entries) | | 7 | 7 | 7 | 21 |

== Medal summary ==
| Classification | Gold | | Silver | | Bronze | |
Time trials
| B | Katie-George Dunlevy Pilot: Linda Kelly; Ireland | 38:16.58 | Sophie Unwin Pilot: Jenny Holl; Great Britain | 39:40.18 | Lora Fachie Pilot: Corrine Hall; Great Britain | 40:41.30 |
| H1-3 | Katerina Brim; United States | 24:14.59 (28:08.83) | Lauren Parker; Australia | 24:24.09 (24:24.09) | Annika Zeyen-Giles; Germany | 25:30.84 (25:30.84) |
| H4-5 | Oksana Masters; United States | 23:45.20 | Chantal Haenen; Netherlands | 23:51.44 | Sun Bianbian; China | 25:13.07 |
| C1-3 | Maike Hausberger; Germany | 21:30.45 (22:10.09) | Frances Brown; Great Britain | 21:46.18 (23:57.73) | Anna Beck; Sweden | 21:54.71 (21:54.71) |
| C4 | Samantha Bosco; United States | 21:39.24 | Meg Lemon; Australia | 21:44.16 | Franziska Matile-Dörig; Switzerland | 21:44.33 |
| C5 | Sarah Storey; Great Britain | 20:22.15 | Heidi Gaugain; France | 20:26.84 | Alana Forster; Australia | 21:00.48 |
| T1-2 | Marieke van Soest; Netherlands | 25:47.78 (29:03.58) | Celine van Till; Switzerland | 27:58.13 (27:58.13) | Emma Lund; Denmark | 28:52.13 (28:52.13) |
