= Athletics at the 2020 Summer Paralympics – Men's 400 metres T52 =

Men's 400 metres T52 at the XVI Paralympic Games
- Venue: Tokyo National Stadium
- Dates: 27 August 2021 (final)
- Competitors: 11 from 7 nations
- Winning time: 55.39

Medalists
1st place, gold medalist(s)		Tomoki Sato	Japan
2nd place, silver medalist(s)		Raymond Martin	United States
3rd place, bronze medalist(s)		Hirokazu Ueyonabaru	Japan

The men's 400 metres T52 event at the 2020 Summer Paralympics in Tokyo, took place on 27 August 2021.

The T52 category is for wheelchair athletes with damage to spinal cord in the higher parts of the back, substantially impaired or no trunk function, and minimal or no leg function. Pushing power comes from elbow extensions, and appears close to normal except for use of modified gloves to compensate for grip.

== Records ==
Prior to the competition, the existing records were as follows:

World record	Tomoki Sato (JPN)	55.13	Machida, Japan	1 July 2018
Paralympic record	Tomoya Ito (JPN)	57.25	Beijing, China	12 September 2008

Area	Time	Athlete	Nation
Africa	1:01.93	Abdellah Ez Zine	Morocco
America	55.19	Raymond Martin	United States
Asia	55.13 WR	Tomoki Sato	Japan
Europe	1:00.44	Thomas Geierspichler	Austria
Oceania	1:05.21	Lachlan Jones	Australia

== Results ==
=== Heats ===
Heat 1 took place on 27 August 2021, at 10:43:

Rank	Lane	Name	Nationality	Class	Time	Notes
1	6	Raymond Martin	United States	T52	57.70	Q, SB
2	7	Hirokazu Ueyonabaru	Japan	T52	1:01.05	Q
3	4	Leonardo De Jesus Perez Juarez	Mexico	T52	1:02.92	Q
4	3	Jerrold Mangliwan	Philippines	T52	1:03.41	q
5	5	Thomas Geierspichler	Austria	T52	1:04.22	q

Heat 2 took place on 27 August 2021, at 10:50:

Rank	Lane	Name	Nationality	Class	Time	Notes
1	6	Tomoki Sato	Japan	T52	57.33	Q
2	4	Gianfranco Iannotta	United States	T52	1:00.98	Q, SB
3	8	Isaiah Rigo	United States	T52	1:01.75	Q
4	3	Beat Bösch	Switzerland	T52	1:05.10	
5	7	Sam McIntosh	Australia	T52	1:07.97	SB
	5	Edgar Navarro	Mexico	T51	DQ	WPA 17.8

=== Final ===
The final took place on 27 August 2021, at 20:16:

Rank	Lane	Name	Nationality	Class	Time	Notes
1st place, gold medalist(s)	7	Tomoki Sato	Japan	T52	55.39	PR
2nd place, silver medalist(s)	4	Raymond Martin	United States	T52	55.59	SB
3rd place, bronze medalist(s)	5	Hirokazu Ueyonabaru	Japan	T52	59.95	
4	6	Gianfranco Iannotta	United States	T52	1:00.57	PB
5	8	Leonardo De Jesus Perez Juarez	Mexico	T52	1:01.66	
6	2	Thomas Geierspichler	Austria	T52	1:02.68	SB
	3	Jerrold Mangliwan	Philippines	T52	DQ	WPA 18.5a
	9	Isaiah Rigo	United States	T52	DQ	WPA 18.5a
