= Paige Greco =

Australian Paralympic cyclist (1997–2025)

Paige Greco OAM
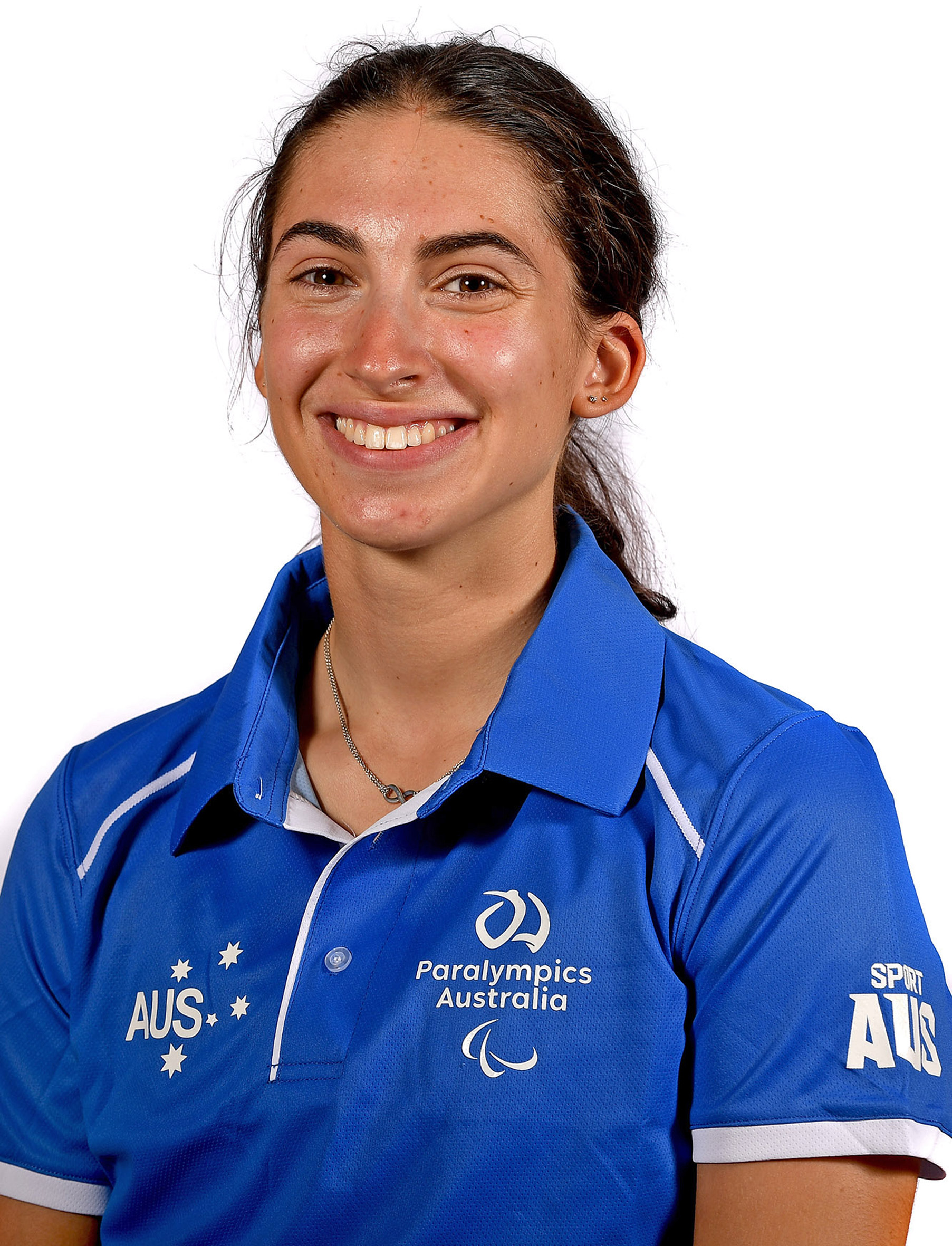
- Greco in 2019

Personal information
- Born: 19 February 1997 Melbourne, Victoria, Australia
- Died: 15 November 2025 (aged 28) Adelaide, South Australia, Australia

Sport
- Country: Australia
- Sport: Cycling
- Disability class: C3
- Club: Port Adelaide Cycling Club
Medal record
Cycling
Paralympic Games
Gold medal – first place	2020 Tokyo	Pursuit C1–3
Bronze medal – third place	2020 Tokyo	Road Time Trial C1–3
Bronze medal – third place	2020 Tokyo	Road Race Trial C1–3
Track World Championships
Gold medal – first place	2019 Apeldoorn	3km Pursuit C3
Gold medal – first place	2019 Apeldoorn	500m Time Trial C3
Silver medal – second place	2019 Apeldoorn	Scratch Race C3
Gold medal – first place	2020 Milton	3km Pursuit C3
Bronze medal – third place	2022 Saint-Quentin-en-Yvelines	500 m Time Trial C3
Bronze medal – third place	2023 Glasgow	Individual pursuit C3
Road World Championships
Gold medal – first place	2019 Emmen	Time Trial C3
Bronze medal – third place	2022 Baie-Comeau	Time Trial C3
Bronze medal – third place	2023 Glasgow	Road Race C3
Bronze medal – third place	2025 Ronse	Road race C3

Paige Greco OAM (19 February 1997 – 15 November 2025) was an Australian Paralympic cyclist who won gold medals at the 2019 Paracycling World Track Championships in C1-3 women's pursuit and at the 2020 Summer Paralympics. She set a new world record of 3:52.283 in the 3000 metre individual pursuit at the Tokyo Paralympics.

== Background ==
Paige Greco was born on 19 February 1997, in Melbourne, Victoria. She had cerebral palsy, mainly affecting the right side of her body, and completed an exercise science degree at the University of South Australia.

== Cycling career ==
Greco was classified as a C3 cyclist. Before turning to cycling, Greco was a promising track and field athlete. In 2018, Greco moved from Victoria to South Australian Sports Institute to be coached by Loz Shaw.

At the 2019 UCI Para-cycling Track World Championships in Apeldoorn, Netherlands, she won gold medals in the Women's 3 km Pursuit C3 and C3 500m Time Trial. In qualifying for Women's 3 km Pursuit final, Greco's time of 4mins 0.206secs broke the existing world record by three seconds. In the 500m Time Trial C3, her time of 39.442secs smashed the previous mark by almost two seconds. She also won the silver medal in the Women's Scratch Race C3. At the 2019 UCI Para-cycling Road World Championships, Emmen, Netherlands, she won the gold medal in the Women's Time Trial C3 and fifth in the Women's Road Race C3. Greco was named the 2019 Cycling Australia para female track cyclist of the year.

At the 2020 UCI Para-cycling Track World Championships in Milton, Ontario, she won the gold medal in the Women's Individual Pursuit C3. In her first Paralympic Games in 2020 Tokyo, Grego won the Women's 3000m Individual Pursuit C1-3, setting a world record time of 3:50.815 in the gold medal race. She won bronze medals in the Women's Road Trial Trial C1-3 with a time of 26:37:54, and Women's Road Race C1-3 with a time of 1:13.11. She was named the 2021 South Australian Sports Institute para athlete of the year.

At the 2022 UCI Para-cycling Road World Championships in Baie-Comeau, she won the bronze medal in the Women's Time Trial C3 and finished 5th in the Women's Road Race C3. At the 2022 UCI Para-cycling Track World Championships in Saint-Quentin-en-Yvelines, France, she won the bronze medal in Women's Time Trial C3. She received the Medal of the Order of Australia (OAM) in 2022, for service to sport as a gold medallist at the Tokyo Paralympic Games 2020.

Greco missed selection for 2024 Paris Paralympics. In 2025, Greco sustained serious injuries in a crash while competing at a Road World Cup event in Maniago, Italy. At the 2025 UCI Para-cycling Road World Championships in Ronse, she won the bronze medal in the Women's Road Race C3 and fifth in the Women's Time Trial C3.

== Death ==
On 16 November 2025, Greco died at the age of 28, after experiencing a "sudden medical episode", at her residence in Adelaide, South Australia.
