= Hirokazu Ueyonabaru =

Japanese Paralympic athlete (1971–2026)

Personal information
- Born: March 22, 1971 Okinawa, Japan
- Died: September 26, 2026 (aged 55) Uruma, Okinawa Prefecture, Japan

Sport
- Sport: Paralympic athletics
- Disability class: T52
Medal record
Men's para-athletics
Representing Japan
Paralympic Games
Silver medal – second place	2008 Beijing	Marathon T52
Bronze medal – third place	2020 Tokyo	400m T52
World Championships
Silver medal – second place	2015 Doha	400m T52
Silver medal – second place	2015 Doha	1500m T52
Silver medal – second place	2025 New Delhi	400m T52
Silver medal – second place	2025 New Delhi	1500m T52
Bronze medal – third place	2017 London	1500m T52
Asian Para Games
Gold medal – first place	2018 Jakarta	800 m T51/52
Silver medal – second place	2014 Incheon	100m T52
Silver medal – second place	2014 Incheon	400m T52
Silver medal – second place	2022 Hangzhou	400 m T52

Hirokazu Ueyonabaru (上与那原 寛和, Ueyonabaru Hirokazu; March 22, 1971 – September 26, 2026) was a Japanese Paralympic athlete competing mainly in category T52 long-distance events.

== Biography ==
Ueyonabaru competed in the 2008 Summer Paralympics in Beijing, China. There he won a silver medal in the men's Marathon T52, finished sixth in the men's 200 m T52, sixth in the men's 400 m T52 and fourth in the men's 800 m T52.

Ueyonabaru died on September 26, 2026, at the age of 55, from injuries sustained in a traffic collision seven days earlier.
