= Fran Brown (paratriathlete) =

British paraclimbing world champion

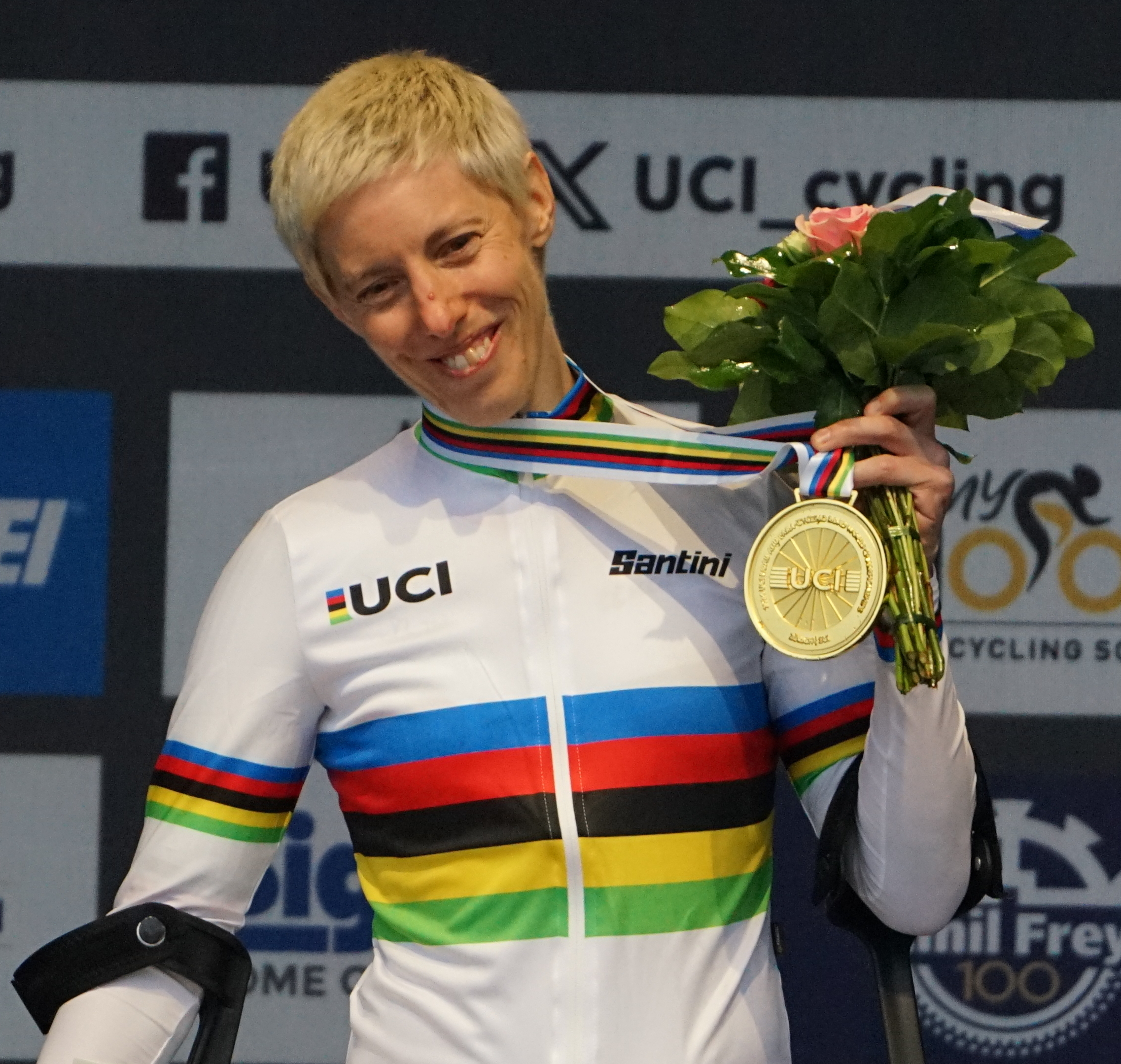
- Brown at the 2024 World Championships

Personal information
- Nationality: British
- Born: 10 October 1984 (age 41) Truro, England

Sport
- Sport: Paratriathlon; Paracycling; Paraclimbing
Medal record
Representing Great Britain
Women's para-cycling
Paralympic Games
Silver medal – second place	2024 Paris	Road time trial C1–3
Track World Championships
Gold medal – first place	2023 Glasgow	Individual pursuit C1
Gold medal – first place	2023 Glasgow	Scratch race C1
Gold medal – first place	2023 Glasgow	Omnium C1
Silver medal – second place	2023 Glasgow	500m time trial C1
Road World Championships
Gold medal – first place	2022 Bae Comeau	Road race C1
Gold medal – first place	2022 Bae Comeau	Time trial C1
Gold medal – first place	2023 Glasgow	Road race C1
Gold medal – first place	2023 Glasgow	Time trial C1
Gold medal – first place	2024 Zurich	Road race C1
Gold medal – first place	2024 Zurich	Time trial C1
Paratriathlon
World Paratriathlon Championships
Gold medal – first place	2019 Lausanne	PTS2
Silver medal – second place	2018 Gold Coast	PTS2
Silver medal – second place	2021 Abu Dhabi	PTS2
Bronze medal – third place	2017 Rotterdam	PTS2
European Paratriathlon Championships
Gold medal – first place	2018 Tartu	PTS2
Gold medal – first place	2019 Valencia	PTS2
Gold medal – first place	2021 Valencia	PTS2
Silver medal – second place	2017 Valencia	PTS2
Paraclimbing
World Championships
Gold medal – first place	2012 Paris	Lead Phy.D

Fran Brown (born 10 October 1984) is a British para-athlete across multiple disciplines. She is a nine-time world champion in paracycling from the 2022, 2023 and 2024 UCI Para-cycling World Championships in the C1 classification, across road and track events, a two-time former paraclimbing Lead world champion from 2012, and the 2019 PTS2 world and three-time European champion in paratriathlon. She won her first Paralympic Games medal, a silver in the combined road time trial for C1, 2 and 3 athletes, in 2024.

== Biography ==
Brown grew up in Cornwall, attending Truro School. She studied lighting technology at Cardiff University and worked as deputy chief electrician for stage theatre productions in London. While at work, Brown suffered a 16-foot fall, dislocating three vertebrae in her neck.

=== Paraclimbing ===
Brown, who had climbed as a child, returned to the sport after her injury. In 2012, she became the paraclimbing world champion, the first British person to hold the title.

=== Paratriathlon ===
In 2018, Brown won the silver medal in her category at the ITU World Championships. In 2019, she became the paratriathlon world champion and European champion in the PTS2 category.

== Results ==
Brown's competition results are listed below. Unless indicated otherwise, the competitions are paratriathlons.

Date	Competition	Rank
2023-08-12	UCI Para Cycling World Championships Glasgow 2023	5× gold 1× silver
2022-08-04	UCI Para Cycling Road World Championships Bae Comeau Canada 2022	C1 TT gold RR gold
2019-09-14	Valencia ETU Paratriathlon European Championships	1
2019-09-01	ITU World Triathlon Grand Final Lausanne	1
2019-08-17	Tokyo ITU Paratriathlon World Cup	2
2019-06-28	Groupe Copley World Paratriathlon Series Montreal	DNS
2019-05-18	Yokohama ITU World Paratriathlon Series	2
2018-09-15	ITU World Triathlon Grand Final Gold Coast	2
2018-07-19	Tartu ETU Triathlon European Championships	1
2018-06-30	Iseo - Franciacorta ITU World Paratriathlon Series	2
2018-05-12	Yokohama ITU World Paratriathlon Series	3
2017-09-15	ITU World Triathlon Grand Final Rotterdam	3
2017-07-28	Edmonton ITU World Paratriathlon Series	3
2017-06-16	Kitzbuhel ETU Triathlon European Championships	2
2016-08-14	GBR Paratriathlon National Championships	1

DNF = Did not finish

DNS = Did not start

DSQ = Disqualified
