= Clara Brown (cyclist) =

American para cyclist

Personal information
- Nickname: Brownie
- Born: November 3, 1995 (age 30) Portland, Maine, U.S.
- Height: 5 ft 3 in (1.60 m)
- Weight: 120 lb (54 kg)

Sport
- Country: United States
- Sport: Para cycling
- Disability: x
- Disability class: C3
- Event(s): Track cycling Road cycling
- Club: Colorado Springs Olympic Training Center
- Coached by: Noah Middlestaedt
Medal record
Para cycling
Representing United States
Paralympic Games
Bronze medal – third place	2024 Paris	Road race C1–3
Road World Championships
Gold medal – first place	2022 Baie-Comeau	Time trial C3
Gold medal – first place	2025 Ronse	Road race C3
Silver medal – second place	2022 Baie-Comeau	Road race C3
Bronze medal – third place	2019 Emmen	Road race C3
Bronze medal – third place	2019 Emmen	Time trial C3
Bronze medal – third place	2025 Ronse	Time trial C3
Track World Championships
Gold medal – first place	2020 Milton	Time trial
Gold medal – first place	2020 Milton	Omnium
Silver medal – second place	2020 Milton	Track pursuit
Silver medal – second place	2020 Milton	Scratch race
Bronze medal – third place	2022 Saint-Quentin-en-Yvelines	Scratch race
Parapan American Games
Gold medal – first place	2019 Lima	Road time trial
Gold medal – first place	2019 Lima	Road race
Gold medal – first place	2019 Lima	Individual pursuit
Bronze medal – third place	2019 Lima	Track time trial

Clara Brown (born November 3, 1995) is an American para cyclist who competes in international level events in both track cycling and road cycling.

== Sporting career ==
=== Early beginnings ===
Brown was a very active young person: she was a competitive gymnast, runner and skier before her freak accident in March 2008 in a gymnastics training session; she sustained an incomplete spinal cord injury when she was twelve years old when she broke two vertebrae and was initially paralyzed from the neck down. She spent many years of spinal cord physical rehabilitation at Shepherd Center in Atlanta during which she developed excruciating pain in her left leg caused by avascular necrosis. In high school, although she was a student at Falmouth High School, was able to join the Waynflete High School crew team as a coxswain.

=== Discovery of para sport ===
She has mild hemiplegia on her right side, causing some limitations in her motor function. On her left side, from the chest down she has lost her sense of hot/cold and sharp/dull.

Brown bought her first modified road bike when she attended first year at University of Puget Sound to use as a means of transport and to keep fit and healthy. Her bike was modified to place the rear brake lever on the left because her right hand is mostly paralyzed. Once she graduated from college, she worked at a bike touring company and this was where she met someone who works for the Paralympic Advisory Committee who invited her to a talent ID camp. She then decided to join the United States Paralympic Committee to become a competitive para-cyclist.

Her first international competition was the Para-cycling World Cup in 2018 at Baie-Comeau in Canada where she placed third in the road race and fourth in the time trial. She went to the 2019 UCI Para-cycling Road World Championships in Emmen, Netherlands and won two of her first medals in the competition: two bronze medals. Then in September, she represented the United States at the 2019 Parapan American Games in Lima, Peru where she won two gold medals and two silver medals in both road and track cycling events.

On April 17, 2021, Brown won the U.S. Paralympics Cycling Open for C3 15 km time trial in Huntsville, Alabama, qualifying her for the upcoming Tokyo 2020 Paralympic Games (delayed until 2021 because of Covid-19).
