= Jyoti Gaderiya =

Indian para athlete

Jyoti Radheshyam Gaderiya (born 1998) is an Indian para cyclist from Maharashtra. She qualified to represent India at the 2024 Summer Paralympics at Paris. She competes in the women's elite C2 category. At the Paris Paralympics on 29 August 2024, she finished 10th in the Women's 3000 m individual pursuit C1-3 with a time of 4:53.929. and 15th place.

== Early life ==
Gaderiya is from Dongargaon village, Mohadi taluk, in Bhandara district. She is the daughter of Radheshyam Kashiram Gaderiya, a farmer, and Usha Radheshyam Gaderiya. She has three sisters and a brother. She used to take part in athletics at school was a state level kabaddi player before her accident. She met with a life-threatening accident in May 2016 and lost her left leg. In 2019, she took up rowing and participated in Asian Rowing Championships where she won a bronze medal. But in 2022, she shifted to cycling. She trains at Hyderabad with Aditya Mehta Foundation. The para athletes from the foundation met the chief minister A. Revanth Reddy and briefed him about their preparations before the Paralympics.

== Career ==
At the para-cycling event of the Asian Track Championships in New Delhi, she won three gold medals. In November 2022, she won a gold medal in the 13 km time trials of the Malaysia Para Road Championship. She also won the 13.5 km Malaysia Para Road Race Championship, 500m Time Trial at the Malaysia Para Track Championship and 3 km individual pursuit at the Malaysia Para Track Championship.

In 2022, she participated in the 10th Asian Road Para Cycling Championship at Tajikistan and the World Para Cycling Track Championships 2022, where she was ranked 8th. In 2023, she took part in the World Para Track Cycling Championship at Scotland. She also represented India at the 2023 Asian Games in China. In November 2024, she took part in the Asian Para Track Cycling Championship at New Delhi.
