= Yvonne Marzinke =

Austrian athlete

Personal information
- Nationality: Austrian
- Born: 15 June 1976 (age 50) Munich, Germany

Sport
- Country: Austria
- Sport: Para-cycling
Medal record
Women's Para-cycling
Representing Austria
European Championships
Bronze medal – third place	2023 Rotterdam	Time trial C2
Bronze medal – third place	2023 Rotterdam	Road race C2

Yvonne Marzinke (born 15 June 1976 in Munich) is a German-born Austrian para-cyclist. She competed at the 2020 Summer Paralympics.

== Career ==
She competed at the 2019 UCI Para Cycling Road World Championships. 2019 UCI World Cup, and 2021 Paracycling World Cup.
