= Anna Beck =

Swedish para-cyclist

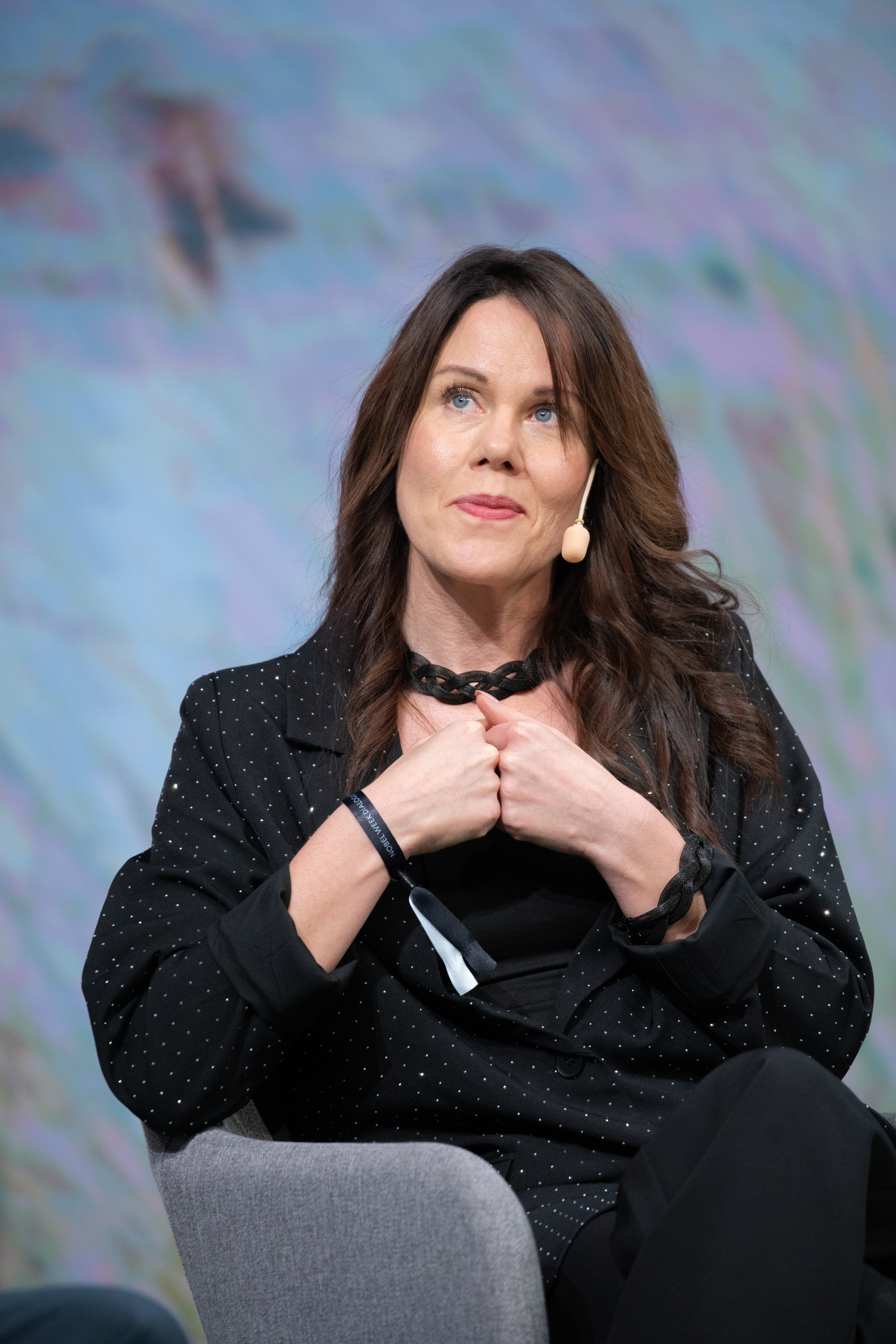
- Beck at 2024 Nobel Week

Personal information
- Born: 24 November 1979 (age 46) Kil, Sweden
- Home town: Kil, Sweden

Sport
- Country: Sweden
- Sport: Para-cycling
- Disability class: C3
- Coached by: Marcus Streijffert
Medal record
Women's para-cycling
Representing Sweden
Paralympic Games
Silver medal – second place	2020 Tokyo	Road time trial C1–3
Silver medal – second place	2020 Tokyo	Road race C1–3
Bronze medal – third place	2024 Paris	Road time trial C1–3
Road World Championships
Gold medal – first place	2017 Pietermaritzburg	Road race C3
Gold medal – first place	2021 Cascais	Road race C3
Gold medal – first place	2021 Cascais	Time trial C3
Gold medal – first place	2023 Glasgow	Time trial C3
Gold medal – first place	2024 Zurich	Time trial C3
Silver medal – second place	2017 Pietermaritzburg	Time trial C3
Track World Championships
Bronze medal – third place	2019 Apeldoorn	Individual pursuit C3

Anna Beck (born 24 November 1979) is a Swedish para-cyclist who represented Sweden in the 2020 and 2024 Summer Paralympics.

== Career ==
Beck represented Sweden at the 2020 Summer Paralympics and won a silver medal in the road race C1–3 and road time trial C1–3.

In September 2024, she represented Sweden at the 2024 Summer Paralympics and won a bronze medal in the road time trial C1–3 event, Sweden's first medal of the 2024 Paralympics. Weeks later, she then competed at the 2024 UCI Para-cycling Road World Championships and won a gold medal in the time trial C3 event.
