= Miho Fujii =

Japanese actress, comedian, and model

Miho Fujii (Japanese: 藤井 美穂, ふじい みほ), is a Japanese actress, comedian, and model.

== Career ==
Fujii was born in Mie Prefecture of Japan.

During high school, she was involved in a local theatre company. After graduating high school, she went to the Toho Gakuen College of Drama and Music. Fujii was inspired to travel abroad and went to a language and drama school in Los Angeles, and appeared in comedy shows.

After that, Fujii became a plus-size model, one of the few Asian plus-size models with the opportunity to appear in movies and television as an actress.
