= Wang Xiaomei =

Chinese Paralympic cyclist

Personal information
- Native name: 王小梅
- Born: 20 August 2000 (age 26) Dali, Yunnan, China

Sport
- Country: China
- Sport: Cycling
Medal record
Paralympic Games
Gold medal – first place	2024 Paris	Pursuit C1–3
Silver medal – second place	2020 Tokyo	Pursuit C1–3
Road World Championships
Silver medal – second place	2023 Glasgow	Time trial C3
Asian Para Games
Silver medal – second place	2022 Hangzhou	Time trial C1–3
Bronze medal – third place	2022 Hangzhou	Road race C1–5
Bronze medal – third place	2022 Hangzhou	Pursuit C1–3
Track World Championships
Gold medal – first place	2020 Milton	Scratch race C3
Gold medal – first place	2024 Rio de Janeiro	500 m time trial C3
Gold medal – first place	2024 Rio de Janeiro	Individual pursuit C3
Gold medal – first place	2024 Rio de Janeiro	Scratch race C3
Gold medal – first place	2024 Rio de Janeiro	Omnium C3
Silver medal – second place	2020 Milton	500 m time trial C3
Silver medal – second place	2020 Milton	Omnium C3
Silver medal – second place	2026 Apeldoorn	Scratch race C3

Wang Xiaomei (王小梅) (born 20 August 2000) is a Chinese cyclist. She won gold at the 2020 Summer Paralympics and the 2024 Summer Paralympics.

== Career ==
She won a silver medal in the women's individual pursuit C1–3 event at the 2020 Summer Paralympics.

At the 2024 UCI Para-cycling Track World Championships she won four gold medals, in the 500 m time trial, individual pursuit, scratch race and omnium events.
