= Keiko Sugiura =

Japanese cyclist

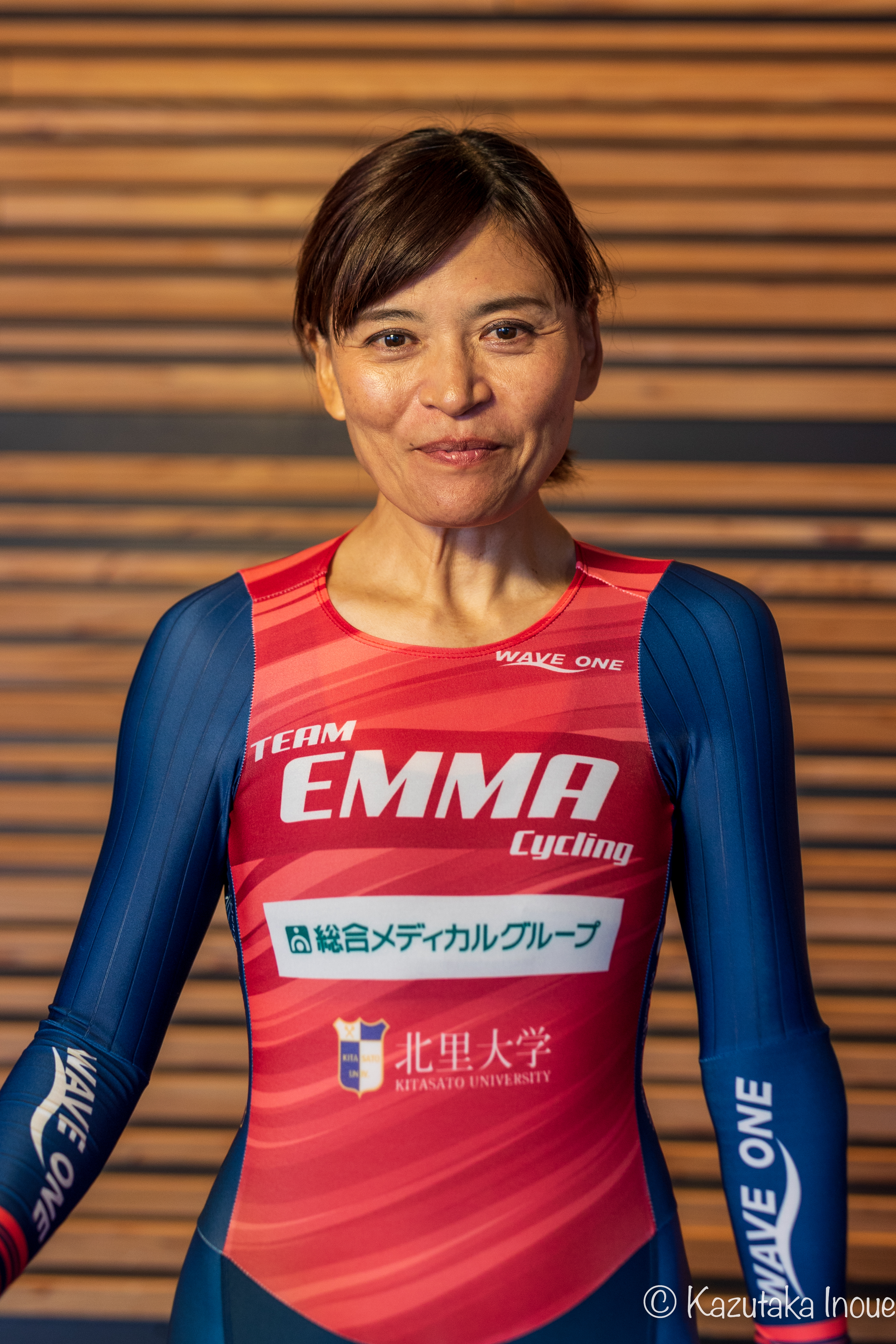

Personal information
- Born: December 26, 1970 (age 55) Kakegawa, Shizuoka, Japan

Cycling career
- Sport: Cycling
- Disciplines: Road track
- Role: Rider
Medal record
Representing Japan
Paralympic Games
Gold medal – first place	2020 Tokyo	Road race C1–3
Gold medal – first place	2020 Tokyo	Time trial C1–3
Gold medal – first place	2024 Paris	Road race C1–3
Road World Championships
Gold medal – first place	2017 Pietermaritzburg	Road race C3
Gold medal – first place	2018 Maniago	Road race C3
Gold medal – first place	2022 Baie-Comeau	Road race C3
Silver medal – second place	2018 Maniago	Time trial C3
Silver medal – second place	2019 Emmen	Road race C3
Silver medal – second place	2019 Emmen	Time trial C3
Silver medal – second place	2022 Baie-Comeau	Time trial C3
Bronze medal – third place	2017 Pietermaritzburg	Time trial C3
Bronze medal – third place	2023 Glasgow	Time trial C3
Track World Championships
Gold medal – first place	2023 Glasgow	Individual pursuit C3
Silver medal – second place	2019 Appeldoorn	Time trial C3
Silver medal – second place	2022 Saint-Quentin-en-Yvelines	Time trial C3
Silver medal – second place	2024 Rio de Janeiro	Individual pursuit C3
Bronze medal – third place	2020 Milton	Time trial C3
Asian Para Games
Silver medal – second place	2026 Aichi–Nagoya	Individual pursuit C1-3

Keiko Sugiura (杉浦佳子, Sugiura Keiko; born December 26, 1970) is a Japanese road and track cyclist in the C3 category from Shizuoka Prefecture. She changed her surname from Noguchi (野口) to her maiden name Sugiura in 2018. She belongs to Team Bridgestone Cycling. She has also been active under the name of Yoshiko Sugiura since around 2019. Sugiura won the gold medal at the women's road time trial, at the 2020 Summer Paralympics and 2024 Summer Paralympics,

== Early life ==
Sugiura was born in Kakegawa, Shizuoka on December 26, 1970. She attended Kakegawa Nishi High School and later Kitasato University Faculty of Pharmaceutical Sciences. After graduating from college, she participated in triathlon and road racing as a hobby while working as a pharmacist and sports pharmacist.

== Career ==
In April 2016, Sugiura was injured during a road race in Shizuoka, resulting in cerebral contusion, traumatic subarachnoid hemorrhage, crushed fracture of skull, clavicle, ribs and scapula, and injuries to the trisection canal. Although she survived, doctors told her she could not heal from her condition, she still had higher brain dysfunction. During the rehabilitation, an acquaintance recommended paracycling, and in March 2017, she returned to the Utsunomiya Criterium & Road Race.

After that, Sugiura registered as a para-cyclist. She won the gold medal in the time trial of the 2017 UCI Para-cycling Road World Championships and got a lot of attention. She also won the gold medal at 2018 UCI Para-cycling Road World Championships in the road race. She was selected as one of the winners of the UCI (Union Cycliste Internationale) annual award, the Para-Cycling Award, for her success this season, including winning the afformentioned road race. The award was her first Japanese award.

At the 2020 Summer Paralympics, Sugiura won the gold medal at the women's road time trial. She thus became the oldest Japanese person to win a Paralympic gold medal at the age of 50. She also won the women's road race, becoming the first Japanese cyclist to win two gold medals in the same Paralympics.

== Personal life ==
Sugiura has two children. Her son, Yuma Noguchi, is also a professional road cyclist.
