= Qian Wangwei =

Chinese para-cyclist (born 1994)

Personal information
- Nationality: Chinese
- Born: 24 September 1994 (age 32)

Sport
- Sport: Para-cycling
- Disability class: C1
Medal record
Para cycling
Representing China
Paralympic Games
| Silver medal – second place | 2024 Paris | 500m time trial C1–3 |
| Bronze medal – third place | 2020 Tokyo | 500m time trial C1–3 |
Track World Championships
| Gold medal – first place | 2020 Milton | 500m time trial C1 |
| Gold medal – first place | 2020 Milton | Individual pursuit C1 |
| Gold medal – first place | 2020 Milton | Scratch race C1 |
| Gold medal – first place | 2020 Milton | Omnium C1 |
| Gold medal – first place | 2023 Glasgow | 500m time trial C1 |
| Gold medal – first place | 2024 Rio de Janeiro | 500m time trial C1 |
| Gold medal – first place | 2024 Rio de Janeiro | Individual pursuit C1 |
| Gold medal – first place | 2024 Rio de Janeiro | Scratch race C1 |
| Gold medal – first place | 2024 Rio de Janeiro | Omnium C1 |
| Gold medal – first place | 2026 Apeldoorn | Sprint C1 |
| Gold medal – first place | 2026 Apeldoorn | Scratch race C1 |
| Gold medal – first place | 2026 Apeldoorn | Time trial C1 |
| Silver medal – second place | 2026 Apeldoorn | Elimination C1 |
Asian Para Games
| Gold medal – first place | 2022 Hangzhou | Time trial C1–3 |

Qian Wangwei (born 24 September 1994) is a Chinese para-cyclist who competed at the 2020 and 2024 Summer Paralympics.

== Career ==
She who won a bronze medal in the time trial C1–3 event at the 2020 Summer Paralympics.
