= Daniela Munévar =

Colombian Paralympic cyclist

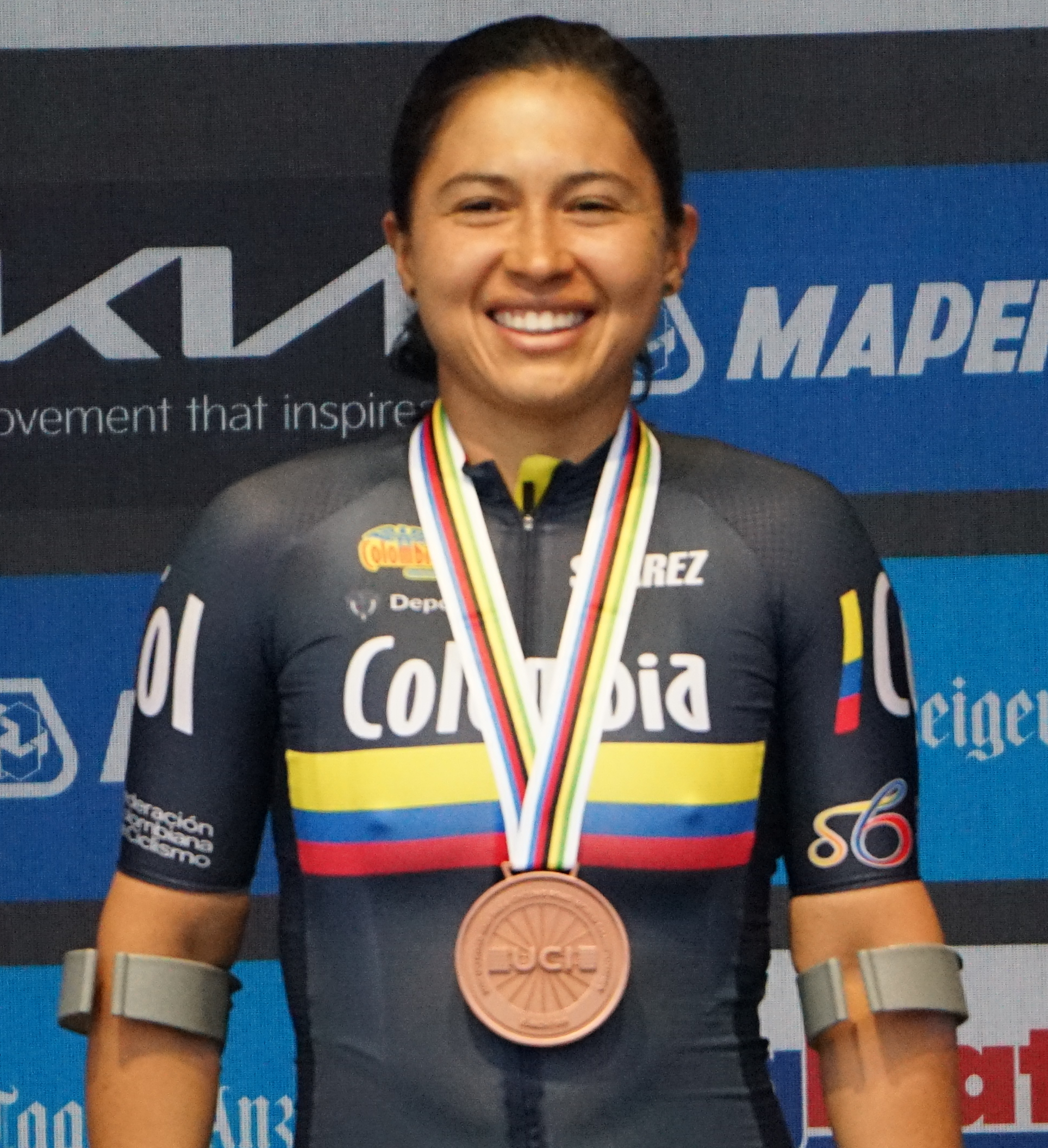
- Munévar at the 2024 World Championships

Personal information
- Full name: Daniela Carolina Munévar Flórez
- Born: 18 July 1995 (age 30) Cucaita, Colombia

Sport
- Country: Colombia
- Sport: Para cycling
- Disability class: C2
Medal record
Para-cycling
Representing Colombia
World Road Championships
| Gold medal – first place | 2017 Pietermaritzburg | Time trial C2 |
| Gold medal – first place | 2021 Cascais | Time trial C2 |
| Silver medal – second place | 2015 Nottwil | Road race C2 |
| Silver medal – second place | 2017 Pietermaritzburg | Road race C2 |
| Silver medal – second place | 2019 Emmen | Road race C2 |
| Silver medal – second place | 2022 Baie-Comeau | Road race C2 |
| Silver medal – second place | 2023 Glasgow | Road race C2 |
| Silver medal – second place | 2025 Ronse | Road race C2 |
| Bronze medal – third place | 2018 Maniago | Time trial C2 |
| Bronze medal – third place | 2018 Maniago | Road race C2 |
| Bronze medal – third place | 2019 Emmen | Time trial C2 |
| Bronze medal – third place | 2021 Cascais | Road race C2 |
| Bronze medal – third place | 2022 Baie-Comeau | Time trial C2 |
| Bronze medal – third place | 2024 Zurich | Road race C2 |
World Track Championships
| Silver medal – second place | 2019 Apeldoorn | Individual pursuit C2 |
| Bronze medal – third place | 2018 Rio de Janeiro | Individual pursuit C2 |
| Bronze medal – third place | 2022 Saint-Quentin-en-Yvelines | Individual pursuit C2 |
| Bronze medal – third place | 2022 Saint-Quentin-en-Yvelines | Omnium C2 |
| Bronze medal – third place | 2024 Rio de Janeiro | Individual pursuit C2 |
| Bronze medal – third place | 2024 Rio de Janeiro | Omnium C2 |
Parapan American Games
| Gold medal – first place | 2023 Santiago | Road race C1-3 |
| Silver medal – second place | 2019 Lima | Road race C1-3 |
| Silver medal – second place | 2019 Lima | Time trial C1-5 |
| Silver medal – second place | 2019 Lima | Individual pursuit C1-3 |
| Bronze medal – third place | 2023 Santiago | Time trial C1-5 |
Pan American Road Championships
| Gold medal – first place | 2022 Maringá | Road race C2 |
| Gold medal – first place | 2022 Maringá | Time trial C2 |
Pan American Track Championships
| Gold medal – first place | 2022 Maringá | Time trial C2 |
| Gold medal – first place | 2022 Maringá | Individual pursuit C2 |
| Gold medal – first place | 2022 Maringá | Omnium C2 |
| Gold medal – first place | 2022 Maringá | Scratch C2 |
South American Para Games
| Gold medal – first place | 2026 Valledupar | Road race C1-3 |
| Gold medal – first place | 2026 Valledupar | Time trial C1-3 |

Daniela Carolina Munévar Flórez (born 18 July 1995) is a Colombian Paralympic cyclist who competes in international road cycling events. She is a Parapan American Games champion, double World champion and has competed at the 2016 and 2020 Summer Paralympics.

== Personal life ==
In April 2014, Munévar was involved in a road accident when a truck hit and dragged her while she was cycle training near Duitama. She has a lower leg amputation and uses crutches.

== Career ==
Munévar was awarded the Best Paralympic Athlete of the Year in 2022 following her success at the UCI World Para Championships.
