= C3 (classification) =

Para-cycling classification

C3 is a para-cycling classification. The class includes people with moderate upper or lower limb dysfunctions and includes cyclists with cerebral palsy, limb impairments and amputations. The UCI recommends this be coded as MC3 or WC3. The class competes at the Paralympic Games.

== Definition ==
PBS defined this classification as "Cyclists with upper or lower limb disabilities and moderate neurological dysfunction." The Telegraph defined this classification in 2011 as "C 1–5: Athletes with cerebral palsy, limb impairments and amputations." The UCI recommends this be coded as MC3 or WC3.

== Disability groups ==
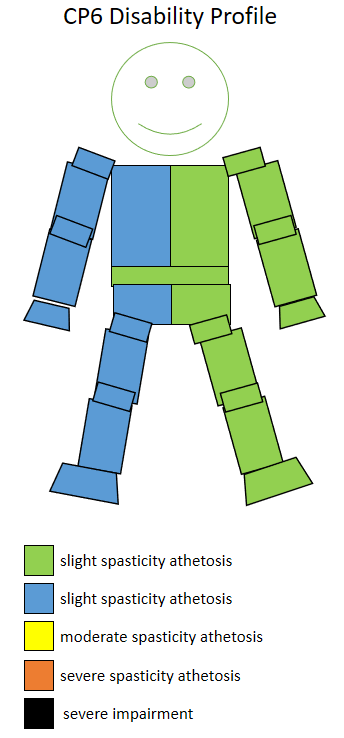
The spasticity athetosis level and location of a CP6 sportsperson.

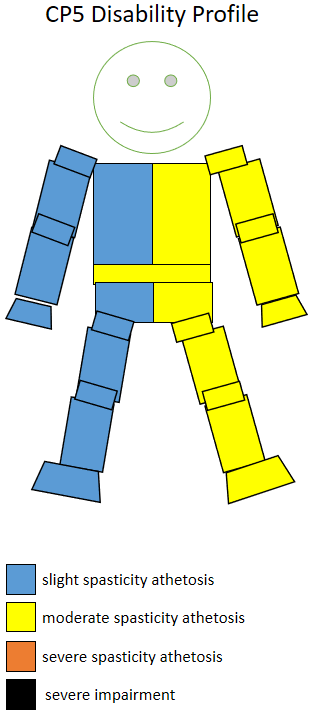
The spasticity athetosis level and location of a CP5 sportsperson.

People with cerebral palsy are one of the groups covered by this classification, specifically the CP5 and CP6 classes. CP5 and CP6 competitors may compete using tricycles in the T2 class or they can choose to compete in the C3 class.

CP5 sportspeople in this class have greater functional control of their upper body. They may require the use of an assistive device when walking but they do not require use of a wheelchair. They often have problems with their dynamic equilibrium but not their static equilibrium. Quick movements can upset their balance.

CP6 sportspeople are able to walk without the need for an assistive device. They lack coordination in all their limbs, with the greater lack of coordination involving their upper body. Their bodies are often in motion, and they cannot maintain a still state. While CP2, CP3 and CP6 have similar issues with Athetoid or Ataxic, CP6 competitors have "flight" while they are ambulant in that it is possible for both feet to not be touching the ground while walking. CP2 and CP3 are unable to do this.

== Classification history ==
Cycling first became a Paralympic sport at the 1988 Summer Paralympics. In September 2006, governance for para-cycling passed from the International Paralympic Committee's International Cycling Committee to UCI at a meeting in Switzerland. When this happened, the responsibility of classifying the sport also changed.

== At the Paralympic Games ==
For the 2016 Summer Paralympics in Rio, the International Paralympic Committee had a zero classification at the Games policy. This policy was put into place in 2014, with the goal of avoiding last minute changes in classes that would negatively impact athlete training preparations. All competitors needed to be internationally classified with their classification status confirmed prior to the Games, with exceptions to this policy being dealt with on a case-by-case basis.

== Becoming classified ==
Classification is handled by Union Cycliste Internationale. Classification for the UCI Para-Cycling World Championships is completed by at least two classification panels. Members of the classification panel must not have a relationship with the cyclist and must not be involved in the World Championships in any other role than as classifier. In national competitions, the classification is handled by the national cycling federation. Classification often has three components: physical, technical and observation assessment.

== Rankings ==
This classification has UCI rankings for elite competitors.

== Competitors ==
Competitors in this class include Australia's Simone Kennedy and Ireland's Eoghan Clifford.

== See also ==
- Para-cycling classification
- Cycling at the Summer Paralympics
