= 2026 UCI Para-cycling Road World Championships =

Cycling world championships

- Location: Huntsville, Alabama, United States
- Dates: 4–7 September

The 2026 UCI Para-cycling Road World Championships was the 15th edition of World Championships for road cycling for athletes with a physical disability. The championships took place in Cummings Research Park in Huntsville, Alabama, United States from 4 to 7 September 2026 where a total of 348 athletes from 49 countries were set to compete.

== Medalists ==
Events are held in four broad categories, with four different types of bicycle, denoted by a letter-number code:

- B1 are pairs races for blind and visually impaired cyclists, riding a tandem bicycle with a sighted 'pilot'.
- C1-C5 are cyclists on standard or near-standard bicycles, with minor modifications to allow use by paracyclists, e.g. attachments on handlebars or pedals.
- H1-H5 are hand cycling races using tricycles powered by hand-cranking of pedals from a recumbent position. Typically hand-cyclists share similar lower body disabilities to wheelchair racing athletes in para athletics, but in H1-H5 events, their power is applied indirectly through a chained and geared pedal system rather than directly to the wheels of the chair by pushing to create the distinction between cycling and athletics. There are no 'H' class track events.
- T1-T2 are Tricycle races, typically for cyclists with good movement but significant balance or co-ordination issues for whom a two-wheeled bicycle is not suitable. There are no 'T' class track events.

As a general rule, the lower the number in the race code (e.g., C4 or H2), the greater the level of impairment.

=== Men's events ===
Event	Class	Gold		Silver		Bronze	
Time trial
14.6 km time trial	T1	Jianxin Chen; China	24:36,11	Anthony Bethleem; France	+ 00:00,50	Lu Rongfei; China	+ 00:14,94
14.6 km time trial	T2	Maximilian Jäger; Germany	22:22,07	Calum O'Neill; Great Britain	+ 00:01,01	Dennis Connors; United States	+ 00:11,32
14.6 km time trial	H1	Patrik Jahoda; Czech Republic	30:42,59	Barry Wilcox; United States	+ 00:14,65	Nicolas Pieter Du Preez; South Africa	+ 00:23,46
14.6 km time trial	H2	Florian Jouanny; France	22:44,98	Luca Mazzone; Italy	+ 00:17,53	Cody Wills; United States	+ 01:21,83
14.6 km time trial	C1	Thomas Tarou; France	19:30,00	Ricardo Ten Argilés; Spain	+ +00:33,87	Aaron Keith; United States	+ +00:41,10
14.6 km time trial	C2	Alexandre Léauté; France	17:57,12	Arthur Bauchet; France	+ 00:02,36	Ewoud Vromant; Belgium	+ 00:25,69
29.2 km time trial	C3	Louis Hubert; France	36:03,41	Michael Sametz; Canada	+ 00:29,89	Alexandre Hayward; Canada	+ 00:59,77
29.2 km time trial	C4	Gatien Le Rousseau; France	35:11,16	Kévin Le Cunff; France	+ 00:57,57	Mattis Lebeau; France	+ 01:18,05
29.2 km time trial	C5	Elouan Gardon; United States	33:59,81	Daniel Abraham Gebru; Netherlands	+ 01:24,03	Lauro Cesar Mouro Chaman; Brazil	+ 02:05,36
29.2 km time trial	H3	Marvin Odent; Belgium	40:54,12	Micha Wäfler; Switzerland	+ 00:47,77	Daniel Ulmann; Germany	+ 01:00,70
29.2 km time trial	H4	Thomas Frühwirth; Austria	32' 35.22"	Callum Russell; Great Britain	+ 00:40,10	Joseph Fritsch; France	+ 00:54,29
29.2 km time trial	H5	Loïc Vergnaud; France	40:49,23	Mitch Valize; Netherlands	+ 00:32,91	Liu Qiangli; China	+ 01:58,46
29.2 km time trial	B	France; Elie de Carvalho; Pilot: Mickaël Guichard	31:56,01	Netherlands; Tristan Bangma; Pilot: Patrick Bos	+ 00:24,73	France; Alexandre Lloveras; Pilot: Thomas Denis	+ 00:36,62
Road race
41.4 km road race	T1	Lu Rongfei; China	1:11:46	Jianxin Chen; China	+ 00:03	Giorgio Farroni; Italy	+ 00:04
41.4 km road race	T2	Tim Celen; Belgium	1:08:20	Dennis Connors; United States	00:0	Felix Barrow; Great Britain	+ 00:02
55.2 km road race	H1	Fabrizio Cornegliani; Italy	1:59:13	Maarten Duif; Canada	1 LAP	Patrik Jahoda; Czech Republic	1 LAP"
55.2 km road race	H2	Florian Jouanny; France	1:29:08	Luca Mazzone; Italy	00:00	Cody Wills; United States	+ 00:18
69.0 km road race	H3	Johan Quaile; France	1:39:49	Christian Gyldenøhr; Norway	00:00	Micha Wäfler; Switzerland	+ 00:02
69.0 km road race	H4	Callum Russell; Great Britain	1:39:32	Fabian Recher; Switzerland	00:00	Joseph Fritsch; France	00:00
69.0 km road race	H5	Mitch Valize; Netherlands	1:55:07	Liu Qiangli; China	00:00	Loïc Vergnaud; France	00:00
69.0 km road race	C1	Liang Weicong; China	1:55:20	Thomas Tarou; France	00:00	Pierre Senska; Germany	+ 00:02
69.0 km road race	C2	Alexandre Léauté; France	1:36:07	Arthur Bauchet; France	+ 00:36	Hidde Buur; Netherlands	+ 00:36
69.0 km road race	C3	Thomas Peyroton-Dartet; France	1:36:43	Juan Alberto Jiménez Gutiérrez; Spain	+ 00:04	Eduardo Santas Asensio; Spain	+ 00:09
82.8 km road race	C4	Andrea Biancalani; Italy	2:00:05	Kévin Le Cunff; France	00:00	Archie Atkinson; Great Britain	00:00
82.8 km road race	C5	Eliott Pierre; France	1:50:09	Carlos Andrés Vargas Villanueva; Colombia	00:00	Dorian Foulon; France	00:00
96.6 km road race	B	Spain; Imanol Arriortua Zorrilla; Pilot: Mikel Aristi Gardoki	01:57:46	Spain; Joan Sansó Riera; Pilot: Eloy Teruel	+ 00:13	Netherlands; Tristan Bangma; Pilot: Patrick Bos	+ 00:25

=== Women's events ===
Event	Class	Gold		Silver		Bronze	
Time trial
14.6 km time trial	T1	Marjona Pardaboyeva; Uzbekistan	29:42,82	Pavlína Vejvodová; Czech Republic	+ 00:17,50	Quan Shiqi; China	+ 01:25,76
14.6 km time trial	T2	Celine van Till; Switzerland	26:03,93	Emma Lund; Denmark	+ 00:24,48	Angelika Dreock-Käser; Germany	+ 00:56,22
14.6 km time trial	H1	Pokiza Akhmadbekova; Uzbekistan	44:09,15	Manuela Vos van den Bouwhuijsen; Spain	+ 02:52,60		
14.6 km time trial	H2	Katerina Brim; United States	23:20,58	Roberta Amadeo; Italy	+ 08:59,18	Patcharapha Seesen; Thailand	+ 11:34,15
14.6 km time trial	H3	Lauren Parker; Australia	23:03,62	Anaïs Vincent; France	+ 00:33,37	Jessica Moreira Ferreira; Brazil	+ 01:28,71
14.6 km time trial	H4	Emelia Perry; United States	23:05,35	Sandra Fuhrer; Switzerland	+ 00:55,98	Cornelia Wibmer; Austria	+ 01:06,92
14.6 km time trial	H5	Chantal Haenen; Netherlands	22:45,97	Sun Bianbian; China	+ 01:58,01	Ana Maria Vitelaru; Italy	+ 02:36,68
14.6 km time trial	C1	Tahlia Clayton-Goodie; Australia	22:47,22	Qian Wangwei; China	+ 01:05,80	Victoria Maria de Camargo e Barbosa; Brazil	+ +04:41,74
14.6 km time trial	C2	Amelia Cass; Great Britain	21:17,96	Flurina Rigling; Switzerland	+ 00:10,97	Allison Jones; United States	+ 01:28,48
14.6 km time trial	C3	Wang Xiaomei; China	20:43,44	Marie Quellhorst; Germany	+ 00:01,80	Emily Petricola; Australia	+ 00:04,43
29.2 km time trial	C4	Samantha Bosco; United States	40:10,93	Tara Neyland; Australia	+ 00:45,80	Grace Norman; United States	+ 00:56,61
29.2 km time trial	C5	Heidi Gaugain; France	39:14,49	Alana Forster; Australia	+ 01:21,05	Crystal Lane-Wright; Great Britain	+ 02:19,71
29.2 km time trial	B	Ireland; Katie-George Dunlevy; Pilot: Linda Kelly	36:55,48	Ireland; Sinead Greenan; Pilot: Alice Sharpe	+ 00:32,60	United Kingdom; Sophie Unwin; Pilot: Jenny Holl	+ 00:53,31
Road race
27.6 km road race	T1	Marjona Pardaboyeva; Uzbekistan	0:56:38	Quan Shiqi; China	+ 01:51	Pavlína Vejvodová; Czech Republic	+ 01:53
27.6 km road race	T2	Rita Malinkiewicz; Poland	0:52:05	Wu Wenxi; China	00:00	Celine van Till; Switzerland	00:00
13.8 km road race	H1	Manuela Vos van den Bouwhuijsen; Spain	0:44:29	Pokiza Akhmadbekova; Uzbekistan	+ 03:50		
27.6 km road race	H2	Katerina Brim; United States	0:46:11	Roberta Amadeo; Italy	+ 16:14	Patcharapha Seesen; Thailand	+ 21:12
55.2 km road race	H3	Anaïs Vincent; France	1:30:47	Jady Martins Malavazzi; Brazil	00:00	Lauren Parker; Australia	00:00
55.2 km road race	H4	Sandra Fuhrer; Switzerland	1:30:47	Emelia Perry; United States	+ 04:44	Kristina Madajová; Slovakia	+ 04:44
55.2 km road race	H5	Chantal Haenen; Netherlands	1:30:40	Sun Bianbian; China	+ 12:09	Ana Maria Vitelaru; Italy	+ 17:40
55.2 km road race	C1	Qian Wangwei; China	1:41:51	Tahlia Clayton-Goodie; Australia	+ 00:03	Victoria Maria de Camargo e Barbosa; Brazil	-1 LAP
55.2 km road race	C2	Flurina Rigling; Switzerland	1:41:51	Heather Jameson; Ireland	+ 00:03	Amelia Cass; Great Britain	+ 00:03
55.2 km road race	C3	Wang Xiaomei; China	1:32:14	Clara Brown; United States	00:00	Keiko Sugiura; Japan	00:00
69.0 km road race	C4	Samantha Bosco; United States	1:44:55	Tara Neyland; Australia	00:00	Li Xiaohui; China	+ 02:41
69.0 km road race	C5	Anna Harkowska; Poland	1:45:58	Margot Boulet; France	00:00	Alana Forster; Australia	00:00
82.8 km road race	B	United Kingdom; Sophie Unwin; Pilot: Jenny Holl	02:03:30	Ireland; Sinead Greenan; Pilot: Alice Sharpe	00:00	Italy; Marianna Agostini; Pilot: Noemi Lucrezia Eremita	+ 00:02

=== Mixed events ===
Event	Class	Gold		Silver		Bronze	
18.9 km team relay	H1–5	France; Johan Quaile; Anaïs Vincent; Joseph Fritsch	29:09	United States; Thomas Davis; Katerina Brim; Matt Tingley	+ 00:43	Australia; Grant Allen; Alex Welsh; Lauren Parker	+ 00:46

== Medal table ==
* Host nation (United States)

Rank	Nation	Gold	Silver	Bronze	Total
1	France (FRA)	15	8	6	29
2	China (CHN)	6	7	4	17
3	United States (USA)*	6	5	6	17
4	Switzerland (SUI)	3	4	2	9
5	Netherlands (NED)	3	3	2	8
6	Great Britain (GBR)	3	2	5	10
7	Uzbekistan (UZB)	3	1	0	4
8	Australia (AUS)	2	4	4	10
8	Italy (ITA)	2	4	4	10
10	Spain (ESP)	2	4	1	7
11	Belgium (BEL)	2	0	1	3
12	Poland (POL)	2	0	0	2
13	Ireland (IRL)	1	3	0	4
14	Germany (GER)	1	1	3	5
15	Czech Republic (CZE)	1	1	2	4
16	Austria (AUT)	1	0	1	2
17	Canada (CAN)	0	2	1	3
18	Brazil (BRA)	0	1	4	5
19	Colombia (COL)	0	1	0	1
19	Denmark (DEN)	0	1	0	1
19	Norway (NOR)	0	1	0	1
22	Thailand (THA)	0	0	2	2
23	Japan (JPN)	0	0	1	1
23	Slovakia (SVK)	0	0	1	1
23	South Africa (RSA)	0	0	1	1
Totals (25 entries)		53	53	51	157
