= Cycling at the 2024 Summer Paralympics – Women's road time trial C4 =

Women's road time trial C4 at the XVII Paralympic Games
- Venue: Clichy-sous-Bois
- Dates: 4 September
- Competitors: 9 from 6 nations
- Winning time: 21:39.24

Medalists
1st place, gold medalist(s)		Samantha Bosco	United States
2nd place, silver medalist(s)		Meg Lemon	Australia
3rd place, bronze medalist(s)		Franziska Matile-Dörig	Switzerland

The Women's time trial C4 road cycling event at the 2024 Summer Paralympics took place on 4 September 2024, at Clichy-sous-Bois, Paris. Nine riders competed in the event.

The C4 classification is for cyclists described as follows:

C4: mild hemiplegic or diplegic spasticity; mild athetosis or ataxia; unilateral below knee or bilateral below elbow amputation, etc.

== Results ==
Rank	Rider	Nationality	Result	Deficit	Notes
1st place, gold medalist(s)	Samantha Bosco	United States	21:39.24		
2nd place, silver medalist(s)	Meg Lemon	Australia	21:44.16	+00:04.92	
3rd place, bronze medalist(s)	Franziska Matile-Dörig	Switzerland	21:44.33	+00:05.09	
4	Emily Petricola	Australia	21:48.44	+00:09.20	
5	Keely Shaw	Canada	22:09.19	+00:29.95	
6	Shawn Morelli	United States	22:53.35	+01:14.11	
7	Anna Grace Taylor	New Zealand	23:48.67	+02:09.43	
8	Li Xiaohui	China	24:03.84	+02:24.60	
–	Kate O'Brien	Canada	DNF	–	
