= Cycling at the 2020 Summer Paralympics – Women's road time trial C4 =

Women's road time trial C4 at the XVI Paralympic Games
- Venue: Fuji Speedway
- Dates: 31 August 2021
- Competitors: 8 from 6 nations
- Winning time: 39:33.79

Medalists
1st place, gold medalist(s)		Shawn Morelli	United States
2nd place, silver medalist(s)		Emily Petricola	Australia
3rd place, bronze medalist(s)		Meg Lemon	Australia

The women's time trial class C4 road cycling event at the 2020 Summer Paralympics took place on 31 August 2021 at Fuji Speedway, Japan. 8 riders from 6 nations competed in this event.

The C4 classification is for cyclists with mild hemiplegic or diplegic spasticity; mild athetosis or ataxia; unilateral below knee or bilateral below elbow amputation, etcetera.

== Results ==
The event took place on 31 August 2021, at 8:30:

Rank	Rider	Nationality	Time	Deficit
1st place, gold medalist(s)	Shawn Morelli	United States	39:33.79	
2nd place, silver medalist(s)	Emily Petricola	Australia	39:43.09	+9.30
3rd place, bronze medalist(s)	Meg Lemon	Australia	41:14.42	+1:40.63
4	Keely Shaw	Canada	42:11.09	+2:37.30
5	Katell Alençon	France	44:18.59	+4:44.80
6	Ruan Jinping	China	44:55.99	+5:22.20
	Anna Taylor	New Zealand	DNF	
	Kate O'Brien	Canada	DNF	
