= Cody Wills =

American cyclist (born 1990)

Personal information
- Born: September 26, 1990 (age 36) Harrisburg, Pennsylvania, U.S.

Cycling career
- Sport: Cycling
- Discipline: Road
Medal record
Representing the United States
Road World Championships
Bronze medal – third place	2026 Huntsville	Road race H2
Bronze medal – third place	2026 Huntsville	Time trial H2

Cody Wills (born September 26, 1990) is an American cyclist. He has won multiple medals in the UCI Para-cycling Road World Championships and competed in the 2024 Summer Paralympics.

== Early life ==
Prior to his para-cycling career, Wills competed in the Pro-Am class of the ATV Motocross National Championship. This ended on February 19, 2011 at a Motorama 2011 qualifying race, where he crashed his ATV and landed on his head, fracturing his C6 vertebra and spinal cord in the process. This event also left him paralyzed.

== Career ==
In August 2023, Wills competed in the Road National Championships, where he won the road race and time trials in the H2 category, after he which took part in the Road World Championships the following month.

Wills competed at the 2024 Summer Paralympics in the road time trial H2 and race H1–2 events, finishing in sixth and fifth place respectively. He competed at the 2025 Road World Championships held in Ronse, Belgium, where he competed in the H2 road race and team relay, finishing in fifth place in both races.

In June 2026, Wills was named to the US squad for the 2026 Road World Championships held in Huntsville, Alabama. He competed there, where he won a bronze medal in both the H2 time trial and road race, which were his first medals in the championships.
