= Cycling at the 2024 Summer Paralympics – Women's pursuit C4 =

Women's individual pursuit C4 at the XVII Paralympic Games
- Venue: Vélodrome National
- Dates: 30 August 2024
- Competitors: 8 from 6 nations

Medalists
1st place, gold medalist(s)		Emily Petricola	Australia
2nd place, silver medalist(s)		Anna Taylor	New Zealand
3rd place, bronze medalist(s)		Keely Shaw	Canada

The women's individual pursuit class C4 track cycling event at the 2024 Summer Paralympics took place on 30 August 2024 at the Vélodrome National.

== Competition format ==
The C category is for cyclists with a physical impairment (muscle power or range of motion, and impairments affecting the coordination) that prevents them from competing in able-bodied competition but still competes using a standard bicycle.

The competition starts with a qualifying round where it comprises a head-to-head race between the 9 cyclists; The 2 fastest cyclists in the qualifying would qualify to the gold medal final while the 3rd and 4th fastest will qualify to the bronze medal final where they will race head-to-head. The distance of this event is 3000 metres. The medal finals are also held on the same day as the qualifying.

== Schedule ==
All times are Central European Summer Time (UTC+2)

Date	Time	Round
30 August	12:15	Qualifying
30 August	15:17	Final

== Results ==
=== Qualifying ===
Rank	Heat	Cyclist	Nation	Result	Notes
1	4	Emily Petricola	Australia	3:35.856	QG, WR
2	3	Anna Taylor	New Zealand	3:42.137	QG
3	2	Keely Shaw	Canada	3:44.012	QB
4	3	Samantha Bosco	United States	3:46.413	QB
5	4	Franziska Matile-Dörig	Switzerland	3:47.142	
6	1	Meg Lemon	Australia	3:49.703	
7	2	Shawn Morelli	United States	3:54.843	
8	1	Li Xiaohui	China	3:57.899	

=== Finals ===
Rank	Cyclist	Nation	Result	Notes
Gold medal final
1st place, gold medalist(s)	Emily Petricola	Australia		
2nd place, silver medalist(s)	Anna Taylor	New Zealand	OVL	
Bronze medal final
3rd place, bronze medalist(s)	Keely Shaw	Canada	3:46.942	
4	Samantha Bosco	United States	3:48.589	
