= Meg Lemon =

Australian Paralympic cyclist

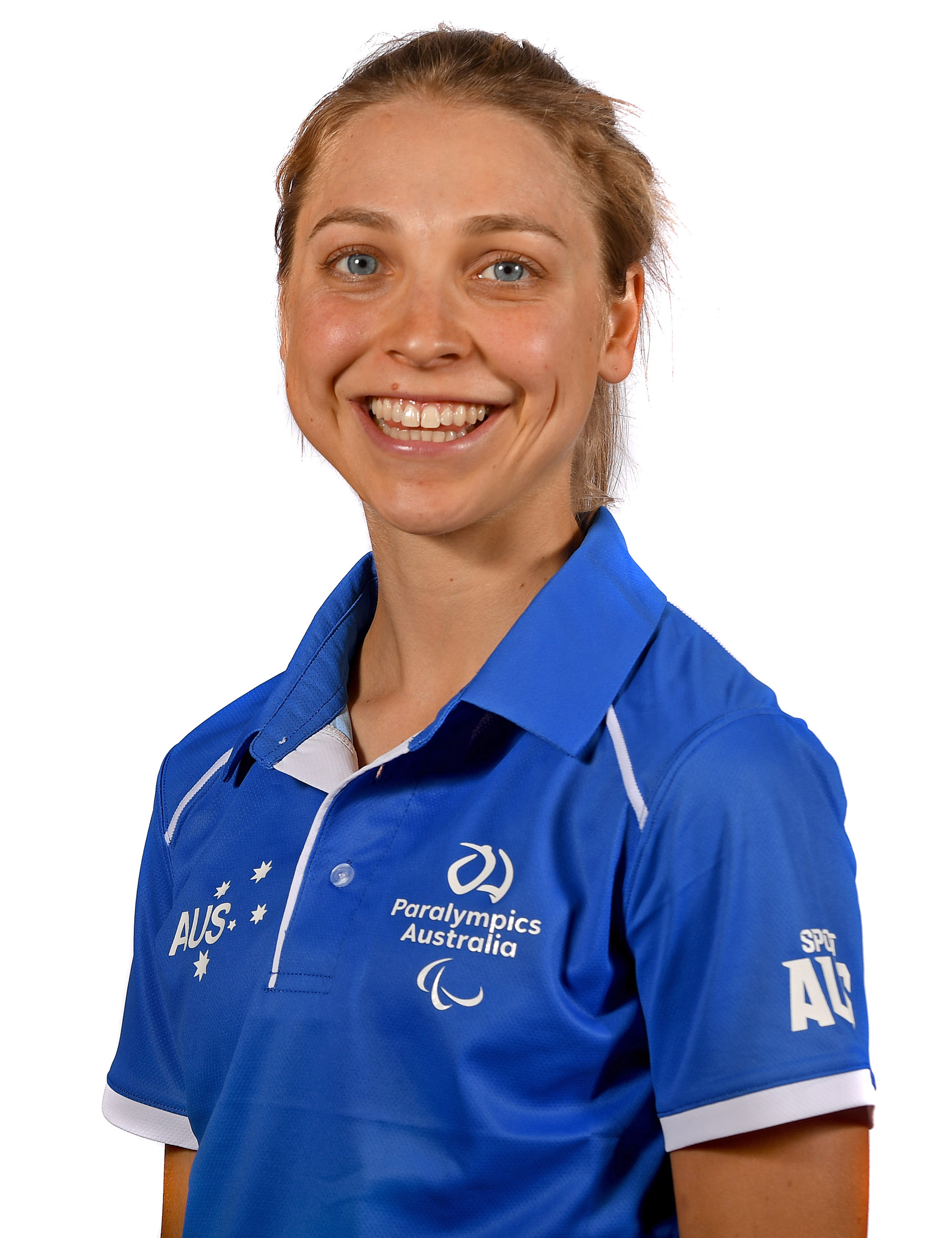
- Meg Lemon in 2019

Personal information
- Nationality: Australian
- Born: 5 October 1989 (age 36)

Sport
- Country: Australia
- Sport: Cycling
- Disability class: C4
- Club: Port Adelaide Cycling Club
Medal record
Cycling
Paralympic Games
Silver medal – second place	2024 Paris	Road Time Trial C4
Bronze medal – third place	2020 Tokyo	Road Time Trial C4
Road World Championships
Silver medal – second place	2022 Baie-Comeau	Road Race C4
Bronze medal – third place	2017 Pietermaritzburg	Time Trial C4
Bronze medal – third place	2017 Pietermaritzburg	Road Race C4
Bronze medal – third place	2018 Maniago	Time Trial C4
Bronze medal – third place	2019 Emmen	Time Trial C4
Bronze medal – third place	2019 Emmen	Road Race Trial C4
Bronze medal – third place	2023 Glasgow	Road race C4
Bronze medal – third place	2025 Ronse	Time trial C4
Bronze medal – third place	2025 Ronse	Road race C4
Track World Championships
Silver medal – second place	2019 Apeldoorn	Scratch Race C4
Silver medal – second place	2020 Milton	Pursuit C4
Bronze medal – third place	2018 Rio	Pursuit C4
Bronze medal – third place	2019 Apeldoorn	Pursuit C4
Bronze medal – third place	2022 Saint-Quentin-en-Yvelines	Pursuit C4
Bronze medal – third place	2022 Saint-Quentin-en-Yvelines	Scratch Race C4

Meg Lemon (born 5 October 1989) is an Australian Paralympic cyclist. She represented Australia at the 2020 Summer Paralympics where she won a bronze medal and the 2024 Summer Paralympics, where she won a silver medal.

== Personal ==
Lemon was born on 5 October 1989. She attended Sacred Heart College in Adelaide, South Australia. Lemon has a bachelor's degree, Nutrition and Dietetics from Flinders University and works as a sports dietitian. Lemon sustained a brain injury when hit by a car while riding to work and left her with a weakened right side of her body.

== Cycling ==
Lemon is classified as a C4 cyclist. In her international debut at the 2017 UCI Para-cycling Track World Championships in Los Angeles, United States, she finished fourth in the Women's C4-C5 Scratch Race.

In September 2017, at the 2017 UCI Para-cycling Road World Championships, Pietermaritzburg, South Africa, Lemon won bronze medals in the Women's Time Trial C4 and Women's Road Race C4. At the 2018 UCI Para-cycling Track World Championships in Rio de Janeiro, Brazil, she won a bronze medal in the Women's Pursuit C4 and was ninth in Women's Scratch Race C4-5 and Women's 500 m Time Trial C4. At the 2018 UCI Para-cycling Road World Championships, Maniago, Italy she won the bronze medal in the Women's Time Trial C4 and finished fourth in the Women's Road Race C4.

At the 2019 UCI Para-cycling Track World Championships in Apeldoorn, Netherlands, she won the silver medal in the Women's Scratch Race C4 and the bronze medal in the Women's Individual Pursuit C4.

At the 2019 UCI Para-cycling Road World Championships in Emmen, Netherlands, she won bronze medals in the Women's Time Trial C4 and Road Race C4.

At the 2020 UCI Para-cycling Track World Championships in Milton, Ontario, she won the silver medal in the Women's Individual Pursuit C4.

At the 2020 Tokyo Paralympics, Lemon won the bronze medal in the Women's Road Time Trial C4 with a time of 41:14.42 and finished fourth in Women's Individual Pursuit C4, ninth together with Amanda Reid and Gordon Allan in the Mixed Team Sprint C1–5 and eighth in Women's Road Race C4-5.

Lemon won the silver medal in the Women's Road Race C4 at 2022 UCI Para-cycling Road World Championships in Baie-Comeau.

At the 2022 UCI Para-cycling Track World Championships in Saint-Quentin-en-Yvelines, France, she won two bronze medals - Women's Pursuit C4 and Women's Scratch Race C4.

At the 2024 Summer Paralympics in Paris, she won silver in the Women's C4 Individual Time Trial. She finished sixth in Women's Individual pursuit C4 and twelfth in the Women's road race C4-5.

At the 2025 UCI Para-cycling Road World Championships in Ronse, she won bronze medals in the Women's Time Trial C4 and Women's Road Race C4.

Lemon has held a South Australian Institute of Sport scholarship athlete.
