= 2025 UCI Para-cycling Road World Championships =

Cycling world championships

- Location: Ronse, Belgium
- Dates: 28–31 August

The 2025 UCI Para-cycling Road World Championships was the 14th edition of World Championships for road cycling for athletes with a physical disability. For the first time in history, the UCI Para-cycling Road World Championships took place in Belgium and with a record 328 athletes from 51 countries, it was the biggest Para-cycling Road World Championships ever in a year following the Paralympic Games. The championships took place in Ronse, Belgium from 28 to 31 August 2025.

== Medalists ==
Events are held in four broad categories, with four different types of bicycle, denoted by a letter-number code:

- B1 are pairs races for blind and visually impaired cyclists, riding a tandem bicycle with a sighted 'pilot'.
- C1-C5 are cyclists on standard or near-standard bicycles, with minor modifications to allow use by paracyclists, e.g. attachments on handlebars or pedals.
- H1-H5 are hand cycling races using tricycles powered by hand-cranking of pedals from a recumbent position. Typically hand-cyclists share similar lower body disabilities to wheelchair racing athletes in para athletics, but in H1-H5 events, their power is applied indirectly through a chained and geared pedal system rather than directly to the wheels of the chair by pushing to create the distinction between cycling and athletics. There are no 'H' class track events.
- T1-T2 are Tricycle races, typically for cyclists with good movement but significant balance or co-ordination issues for whom a two-wheeled bicycle is not suitable. There are no 'T' class track events.

As a general rule, the lower the number in the race code (e.g., C4 or H2), the greater the level of impairment.

=== Men's events ===
Event	Class	Gold		Silver		Bronze	
Time trial
11.6 km time trial	T1	Giorgio Farroni; Italy	+ 1' 25.03"	Junyoung Park; South Korea	+ 43.35"	Aziz Atakhodjaev; Uzbekistan	+ 1' 06.97"
11.6 km time trial	T2	Tim Celen; Belgium	18' 33.90"	Maximilian Jäger; Germany	+ 11.61"	Wolfgang Steinbichler; Austria	+ 20.06"
11.6 km time trial	H1	Fabrizio Cornegliani; Italy	25' 39.20"	Nicolas Pieter Du Preez; South Africa	+ 1' 06.33"	Patrik Jahoda; Czech Republic	+ 2' 05.30"
11.6 km time trial	H2	Florian Jouanny; France	18' 41.21"	Sergio Garrote Muñoz; Spain	+ 27.33"	Luca Mazzone; Italy	+ 29.98"
23.2 km time trial	C1	Ricardo Ten Argilés; Spain	34' 11.01"	Zbigniew Maciejewski; Poland	+ 32.40"	Pierre Senska; Germany	+ 1' 17.35"
23.2 km time trial	C2	Alexandre Léauté; France	31' 10.91"	Darren Hicks; Australia	+ 1' 08.41"	Ewoud Vromant; Belgium	+ 1' 10.87"
23.2 km time trial	C3	Alexandre Hayward; Canada	30' 06.33"	Louis Hubert; France	+ 8.55"	Finlay Graham; Great Britain	+ 13.99"
23.2 km time trial	C4	Mattis Lebeau; France	28' 31.21"	Gatien Le Rousseau; France	+ 11.52"	Kévin Le Cunff; France	+ 12.44"
23.2 km time trial	C5	Franz-Josef Lässer; Austria	28' 25.98"	Dorian Foulon; France	+ 15.55"	Daniel Abraham; Netherlands	+ 55.50"
23.2 km time trial	H3	Mathieu Bosredon; France	33' 36.93"	Johan Quaile; France	+ 54.40"	Marvin Odent; Belgium	+ 1' 02.22"
23.2 km time trial	H4	Thomas Frühwirth; Austria	32' 35.22"	Fabian Recher; Switzerland	+ 27.48"	Callum Russell; Great Britain	+ 44.13"
23.2 km time trial	H5	Mitch Valize; Netherlands	33' 34.87"	Loïc Vergnaud; France	+ 1' 11.62"	Tim de Vries; Netherlands	+ 2' 28.73"
34.8 km time trial	B	France; Elie de Carvalho; Pilot: Mickaël Guichard	40' 08.13"	Netherlands; Tristan Bangma; Pilot: Patrick Bos	+ 7.23"	Netherlands; Vincent ter Schure; Pilot: Timo Fransen	+ 58.54"
Road race
35.0 km road race	T1	Giorgio Farroni; Italy	1h 06' 01"	Junyoung Park; South Korea	+ 2' 55"	Martin Heggelund; Denmark	+ 4' 38"
35.0 km road race	T2	Tim Celen; Belgium	59' 56"	Wolfgang Steinbichler; Austria	+ 3"	Felix Barrow; Great Britain	+ 3"
46.6 km road race	H1	Fabrizio Cornegliani; Italy	1h 18' 34"	Barry Wilcox; United States	+ 1' 08"	Nicolas Pieter Du Preez; South Africa	+ 3' 02"
46.6 km road race	H2	Florian Jouanny; France	1h 17' 08"	Sergio Garrote Muñoz; Spain	+ 0' 35"	Luca Mazzone; Italy	+ 2' 27"
61.6 km road race	H3	Mathieu Bosredon; France	1h 45' 51"	Martino Pini; Italy	+ 1' 46"	Mirko Testa; Italy	+ 1' 48"
61.6 km road race	H4	Joseph Fritsch; France	1h 40' 50"	Fabian Recher; Switzerland	+ 4"	Thomas Frühwirth; Austria	+ 1' 33"
61.6 km road race	H5	Mitch Valize; Netherlands	1h 43' 35"	Loïc Vergnaud; France	+ 1' 28"	Tim de Vries; Netherlands	+ 6' 56"
61.6 km road race	C1	Thomas Tarou; France	1h 41' 22"	Ricardo Ten Argilés; Spain	+ 7"	Michael Teuber; Germany	+ 43"
61.6 km road race	C2	Alexandre Léauté; France	1h 33' 09"	Andrea Ercolanelli; France	+ 1' 00"	Hidde Buur; Netherlands	+ 4' 21"
61.6 km road race	C3	Finlay Graham; Great Britain	1h 31' 51"	Thomas Peyroton-Dartet; France	s.t.	Alexandre Hayward; Canada	+ 2"
92.4 km road race	C4	Mattis Lebeau; France	2h 12' 04"	Kévin Le Cunff; France	s.t.	Archie Atkinson; Great Britain	+ 2' 19"
92.4 km road race	C5	Lauro Chaman; Brazil	2h 11' 29"	Yehor Dementyev; Ukraine	s.t.	Eliott Pierre; France	s.t.
92.4 km road race	B	Italy; Federico Andreoli; Pilot: Francesco Di Felice	2h 05' 08"	Spain; Joan Sansó Riera; Pilot: Eloy Teruel	+ 22"	France; Elie de Carvalho; Pilot: Mickaël Guichard	+ 22"

=== Women's events ===
Event	Class	Gold		Silver		Bronze	
Time trial
11.6 km time trial	T1	Marieke van Soest; Netherlands	+ 23' 15.13"	Marjona Pardaboyeva; Uzbekistan	+ 1' 29.30"	Pavlína Vejvodová; Czech Republic	+ 2' 27' 41"
11.6 km time trial	T2	Celine van Till; Switzerland	+ 21' 26.23"	Angelika Dreock-Käser; Germany	+ 1' 17.10"	Jana Majunke; Germany	+ 1' 57.82"
11.6 km time trial	H1	Manuela Vos van den Bouwhuijsen; Spain	50' 20.88"	Pokiza Akhmadbekova; Uzbekistan	+ 28' 28.48"		
11.6 km time trial	H2	Roberta Amadeo; Italy	27' 48.63"	Patcharapha Seesen; Thailand	+ 1' 53.95"	Gilmara Sol do Rosário Gonçalves; Brazil	+ 7' 05.33"
11.6 km time trial	H3	Lauren Parker; Australia	19' 25.68"	Anaïs Vincent; France	+ 23.75"	Annika Zeyen-Giles; Germany	+ 38.47"
11.6 km time trial	H4	Svetlana Moshkovich; Austria	19' 52.39"	Emelia Perry; United States	+ 8.93"	Cornelia Wibmer; Austria	+ 9.29"
11.6 km time trial	H5	Chantal Haenen; Netherlands	19' 21.16"	Andrea Eskau; Germany	+ 1' 03.25"	Ana Maria Vitelaru; Italy	+ 1' 41.85"
23.2 km time trial	C1	Tahlia Clayton-Goodie; Australia	19' 34.82"	Victoria Maria de Camargo e Barbosa; Brazil	+ 5' 08.14"	Nuraini Muhamad Shukri; Malaysia	+ 6' 33.17"
23.2 km time trial	C2	Flurina Rigling; Switzerland	36' 04.39"	Maike Hausberger; Germany	+ 14.28"	Allison Jones; United States	+ 2' 30.49"
23.2 km time trial	C3	Emily Petricola; Australia	36' 35.00"	Marie Quellhorst; Germany	+ 22.32"	Clara Brown; United States	+ 41.88"
23.2 km time trial	C4	Tara Neyland; Australia	33' 51.60"	Grace Norman; United States	+ 13.60"	Meg Lemon; Australia	+ 27.84"
23.2 km time trial	C5	Alana Forster; Australia	33' 08.41"	Morgan Newberry; Great Britain	+ 1' 55.00"	Nicole Murray; New Zealand	+ 2' 09.27"
23.2 km time trial	B	Ireland; Katie-George Dunlevy; Pilot: Linda Kelly	30' 04.69"	United Kingdom; Sophie Unwin; Pilot: Jenny Holl	+ 31.05"	France; Anne-Sophie Centis; Pilot: Lara Lallemant	+ 1' 43.54"
Road race
23.3 km road race	T1	Marieke van Soest; Netherlands	46' 58"	Marjona Pardaboyeva; Uzbekistan	+ 2' 01"	Pavlína Vejvodová; Czech Republic	+ 3' 50
23.3 km road race	T2	Celine van Till; Switzerland	46' 42"	Rita Malinkiewicz; Poland	+ 1' 02"	Angelika Dreock-Käser; Germany	+ 1' 08
35.0 km road race	H1	Manuela Vos van den Bouwhuijsen; Spain	1h 45' 40"	Pokiza Akhmadbekova; Uzbekistan	1 LAP		
35.0 km road race	H2	Roberta Amadeo; Italy	1h 26' 32"	Patcharapha Seesen; Thailand	+ 9' 25"	Gilmara Sol do Rosário Gonçalves; Brazil	+ 23' 28
46.2 km road race	H3	Lauren Parker; Australia	1h 34' 11"	Anaïs Vincent; France	+ 4' 34"	Annika Zeyen; Germany	+ 8' 12"
46.2 km road race	H4	Sandra Fuhrer; Switzerland	1h 40' 25"	Emelia Perry; United States	+ 2' 27"	Svetlana Moshkovich; Austria	+ 3' 49"
46.2 km road race	H5	Chantal Haenen; Netherlands	1h 37' 37"	Ana Maria Vitelaru; Italy	s.t.	Andrea Eskau; Germany	+ 16' 54
61.6 km road race	C1	Tahlia Clayton-Goodie; Australia	2h 02' 13"	Victoria Maria de Camargo e Barbosa; Brazil	-1 LAP		
61.6 km road race	C2	Flurina Rigling; Switzerland	1h 46' 03"	Daniela Munévar; Colombia	+ 8' 21"	Maike Hausberger; Germany	+ 11' 34"
61.6 km road race	C3	Clara Brown; United States	1h 46' 02"	Jamie Whitmore; United States	+ 5' 43"	Paige Greco; Australia	+ 9' 20"
77.0 km road race	C4	Tara Neyland; Australia	2h 08' 38"	Samantha Bosco; United States	+ 3' 23"	Meg Lemon; Australia	+ 6' 13"
77.0 km road race	C5	Alana Forster; Australia	2h 08' 04"	Anna Harkowska; Poland	+ 38"	Morgan Newberry; Great Britain	+ 3' 22"
77.0 km road race	B	Ireland; Katie-George Dunlevy; Pilot: Linda Kelly	2h 02' 13"	Poland; Patrycja Kuter; Pilot: Karolina Kołkowicz	+ 21"	United Kingdom; Sophie Unwin; Pilot: Jenny Holl	+ 2' 40"

=== Mixed events ===
Event	Class	Gold		Silver		Bronze	
18.9 km team relay	H1–5	France; Joseph Fritsch; Florian Jouanny; Johan Quaile	32:42	Australia; Alex Welsh; Lauren Parker; Grant Allen	33:20	Italy; Davide Cortini; Luca Mazzone; Mirko Testa	33:20

== Medal table ==
* Host nation (Belgium)

Rank	Nation	Gold	Silver	Bronze	Total
1	France (FRA)	12	11	4	27
2	Australia (AUS)	9	2	3	14
3	Italy (ITA)	7	2	5	14
4	Netherlands (NED)	6	1	5	12
5	Switzerland (SUI)	5	2	0	7
6	Spain (ESP)	3	4	0	7
7	Austria (AUT)	3	1	4	8
8	Belgium (BEL)*	2	0	2	4
9	Ireland (IRL)	2	0	0	2
10	United States (USA)	1	6	2	9
11	Great Britain (GBR)	1	2	7	10
12	Brazil (BRA)	1	2	2	5
13	Canada (CAN)	1	0	1	2
14	Germany (GER)	0	5	8	13
15	Uzbekistan (UZB)	0	4	1	5
16	Poland (POL)	0	4	0	4
17	South Korea (KOR)	0	2	0	2
17	Thailand (THA)	0	2	0	2
19	South Africa (RSA)	0	1	1	2
20	Colombia (COL)	0	1	0	1
20	Ukraine (UKR)	0	1	0	1
22	Czech Republic (CZE)	0	0	3	3
23	Denmark (DEN)	0	0	1	1
23	Malaysia (MAS)	0	0	1	1
23	New Zealand (NZL)	0	0	1	1
Totals (25 entries)		53	53	51	157
