= Cycling at the 2020 Summer Paralympics – Women's individual pursuit C4 =

Women's individual pursuit C4 at the XVI Paralympic Games
- Venue: Izu Velodrome
- Dates: 25 August 2021
- Competitors: 6 from 5 nations

Medalists
1st place, gold medalist(s)		Emily Petricola	Australia
2nd place, silver medalist(s)		Shawn Morelli	United States
3rd place, bronze medalist(s)		Keely Shaw	Canada

The women's individual pursuit class C4 track cycling event at the 2020 Summer Paralympics was contested on 25 August 2021 at the Izu Velodrome, Japan. This class is for the cyclist who has impairments that affect their legs, arms, and/or trunk; they are still able to use a standard bicycle. 6 cyclist from 5 nations will be competing in this event.

== Competition format ==
The competition begins off with the qualifying round where all 6 cyclist are divided into 3 heat, each heat containing 2 cyclists, they compete individually in a time trial basis. The 2 fastest in the qualifying round would qualify to the gold medal final while the 3rd and 4th fastest will qualify to the bronze medal final. The distance of this event is 3000m. The events' finals are held on the same day as the qualifying round.

== Schedule ==
Date	Time	Round
25 August	10:56	Qualifying
25 August	14:00	Finals

== Records ==
World Record	Emily Petricola (AUS)	3:44.146	Milton, Canada	1 February 2021
Paralympic Record	Shawn Morelli (USA))	3:57.741	Rio de Janeiro, Brazil	8 September 2016

== Results ==
=== Qualifying ===
Rank	Heat	Nation	Cyclists	Result	Notes
1	2	Australia	Emily Petricola	3:38.061	QG, WR
2	3	United States	Shawn Morelli	3:46.842	QG
3	2	Canada	Keely Shaw	3:49.032	QB
4	3	Australia	Meg Lemon	3:49.043	QB
5	1	New Zealand	Anna Taylor	3:54.167	
6	1	China	Ruan Jianping	4:05.557	

=== Finals ===
Rank	Nation	Cyclists	Result	Notes
Gold medal final
1st place, gold medalist(s)	Australia	Emily Petricola		
2nd place, silver medalist(s)	United States	Shawn Morelli	OVL	
Bronze medal final
3rd place, bronze medalist(s)	Canada	Keely Shaw	3:48.342	
4	Australia	Meg Lemon	3:49.972	
