= Pokiza Akhmadbekova =

Uzbekistani para-cyclist (born 2006)

Personal information
- Born: 19 September 2006 (age 20)

Cycling career
- Sport: Cycling
- Discipline: Road
- Role: Rider
Medal record
Representing Uzbekistan
Women's para-cycling
Road World Championships
Gold medal – first place	2026 Huntsville	Time trial H1
Silver medal – second place	2025 Ronse	Time trial H1
Silver medal – second place	2025 Ronse	Road race H1
Silver medal – second place	2026 Huntsville	Road race H1

Pokiza Akhmadbekova (born 19 September 2006) is an Uzbekistani para-cyclist who competes in handcycling.

== Career ==
Making her Road World Championships debut, Akhmadbekova competed at the 2025 edition in Ronse, where she won a silver medal in the time trial H1 event with a time of 1:18:59,35, finishing 28 minutes behind Manuela Vos. She also competed in the road race in the same category where she won the silver medal, once again finishing behind Vos.

Akhmadbekova won the 2026 Road World Cup, in which she won twice at Thailand and finished in second place in four occasions. At the 2026 Road World Championships held in Huntsville, Alabama, U.S., she won the gold medal in the time trial H1 event with a time of 47:01.75, finishing ahead of Vos. She also finished behind her in the road race where she won the silver medal.
