= Malinkiewicz =

Malinkiewicz [malinˈkjɛvit͡ʂ] is a Polish surname. Archaic feminine forms are Malinkiewiczowa (by husband), Malinkiewiczówna (by father); they still can be used colloquially. Notable people with the surname include:

- Frank Malinkiewicz, Am-Pol Eagle Citizen of the Year Award 1975 winner
- Olga Malinkiewicz (born 1982), Polish physicist, inventor and entrepreneur
- Rita Malinkiewicz (born 1995), Polish cyclist
