= Emily Petricola =

Australian Paralympic cyclist

Emily Petricola OAM
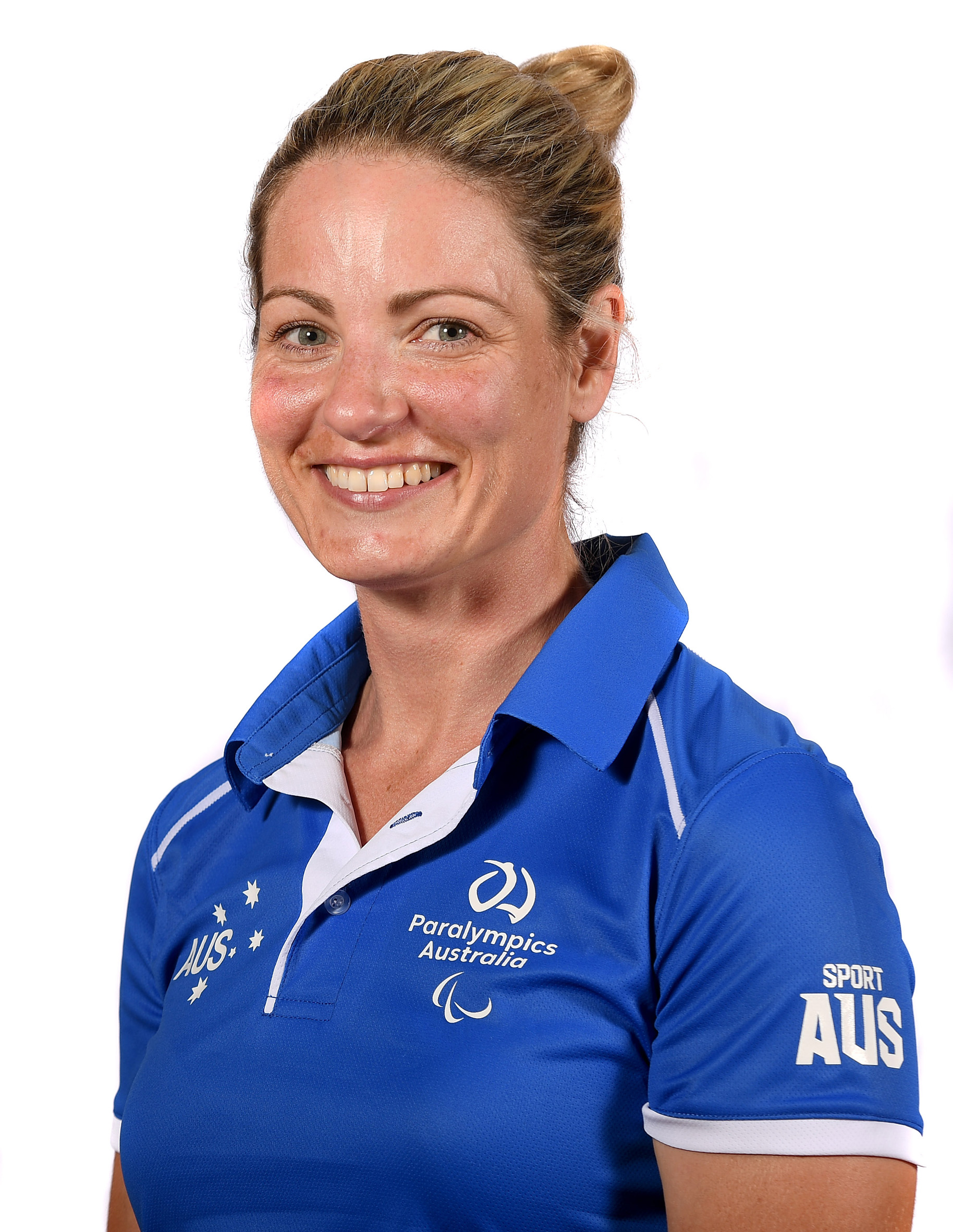
- Emily Petricola in 2019

Personal information
- Nationality: Australian
- Born: 24 April 1980 (age 46)

Sport
- Country: Australia
- Sport: Para-cycling
- Disability class: C4
Medal record
Women's para-cycling
Representing Australia
Paralympic Games
Gold medal – first place	2020 Tokyo	Pursuit C4
Gold medal – first place	2024 Paris	Pursuit C4
Silver medal – second place	2020 Tokyo	Road time trial C4
Track World Championships
Gold medal – first place	2019 Apeldoorn	Individual pursuit C4
Gold medal – first place	2020 Milton	Individual pursuit C4
Gold medal – first place	2020 Milton	Omnium C4
Gold medal – first place	2020 Milton	Scratch Race C4
Gold medal – first place	2022 Saint-Quentin-en-Yvelines	Individual pursuit C4
Gold medal – first place	2022 Saint-Quentin-en-Yvelines	Omnium C4
Gold medal – first place	2022 Saint-Quentin-en-Yvelines	Scatch Race C4
Gold medal – first place	2023 Glasgow	Individual pursuit C4
Gold medal – first place	2024 Rio de Janeiro	Omnium C4
Gold medal – first place	2024 Rio de Janeiro	Individual pursuit C4
Gold medal – first place	2025 Rio de Janeiro	Scratch race C3
Gold medal – first place	2025 Rio de Janeiro	1 km time trial C3
Gold medal – first place	2025 Rio de Janeiro	Elimination C3
Silver medal – second place	2018 Rio	Individual pursuit C4
Silver medal – second place	2019 Apeldoorn	Scratch Race C4
Silver medal – second place	2024 Rio de Janeiro	Scratch Race C4
Bronze medal – third place	2018 Rio	Time Trial C4
Bronze medal – third place	2025 Rio de Janeiro	Sprint C3
Road World Championships
Gold medal – first place	2019 Emmen	Time trial C4
Gold medal – first place	2025 Ronse	Time trial C3
Silver medal – second place	2022 Baie-Comeau	Time trial C4
Silver medal – second place	2023 Glasgow	Time trial C4
Silver medal – second place	2023 Glasgow	Road race C4
Bronze medal – third place	2026 Huntsville	Time trial C3

Emily Petricola OAM (born 24 April 1980) is an Australian Paralympic cyclist. She is a world record holder, gold medallist at the 2020 Tokyo Paralympics and the 2024 Paris Paralympics. She is a multiple gold medallist at the UCI Para-cycling Track World Championships. In 2025, she was appointed South Australian Sports Institute’s (SASI’s) Para Unit Lead.

== Personal ==
In 2007 at the age of 27, Petricola was diagnosed with multiple sclerosis. She used to teach English in a private school. She is a qualified English and humanities teacher.

== Cycling ==
Petricola is classified as a C4 cyclist. In her first major international competition at the 2018 UCI Para-cycling Track World Championships in Rio de Janeiro, Brazil, she won the silver medal in Women's Pursuit C4 and the bronze medal in the Women's 500m Time Trial. In the Women's Pursuit C4 heats she set a world record time.

In 2019, she relocated from Melbourne to the Australian Cycling Team headquarters in Adelaide. At the 2019 UCI Para-cycling Track World Championships in Apeldoorn, Netherlands, she won the gold medal in the Women's Pursuit C4. After breaking the world record in qualifying, in the final she overtook her opponent to win the gold. She also won the bronze medal in the Women's Scratch Race C4.

At the 2019 UCI Para-cycling Road World Championships, Emmen, Netherlands, she won the gold medal in the Women's Time Trial C4 and finished fifth in the Women's Road Race C4.

At the 2020 UCI Para-cycling Track World Championships in Milton, Ontario, she won three gold medals - Women's Individual Pursuit C4, Women's Omnium C4 and Women's Scratch Race C4.

Petricola in her first Paralympic Games in 2020Tokyo, won the Women's 3000m Individual Pursuit C4, setting a world record time of 3:38.061 in the qualifying for the gold medal race. She won the silver medal in the Women's Road Time Trial C4 and finished tenth in the Women's Road Race C4–5.

Petricola won the silver medal in the Women's Time Trial C4 and did not finish the Women's Road Race C4 at 2022 UCI Para-cycling Road World Championships in Baie-Comeau.

At the 2022 UCI Para-cycling Track World Championships in Saint-Quentin-en-Yvelines, France, she won three gold medals - Women's Pursuit C4, Women's Scratch Race C4 and Women's Omnium C4.

At the 2024 UCI Para-cycling Track World Championships in Rio de Janeiro, Brazil, she won two gold medals - Women's Pursuit C4 and Women's Omnium C4 and silver medal in the Women's Scratch Race C4.

She won gold medal in the Women's C4 3000m Individual Pursuit at the 2024 Summer Paralympics in Paris in a world record time of 3:35.856. She finished fourth in the Women's road time trial C4 and eleventh in the Women's road race C4-5.

At the 2025 UCI Para-cycling Road World Championships in Ronse, she won the gold medal in the Women's Time Trial C3.

At the 2025 UCI Para-cycling Track World Championships in Rio de Janeiro, Brazil, she won three gold medals - Women's Time Trial C3, Women's Elimination C3 and Women's Scratch Race C3 and the bronze medal in the Women's Sprint C3.

Petricola featured in Changing Track - a documentary on the Australian Paralympic Cycling team in the lead up to the 2024 Paris Paralympics.

== Recognition ==
- 2023 - 2022 – Medal of the Order of Australia for service to sport as a gold medallist at the Tokyo Paralympic Games 2020
- 2022 - AusCycling - Women’s Track Para-cyclist of the Year
- 2022 - Australian Institute of Sport - Female Para-athlete of The Year
- 2023 - Victorian Institute of Sport Para Athlete of The Year
- 2024 - Victorian Institute of Sport Para Athlete of The Year with Qian Yang
- 2024 - AusCycling - Women’s Track Para-cyclist of the Year
