= Manuela Vos =

Dutch-Spanish para-cyclist (born 1968)

Personal information
- Full name: Manuela Vos van den Bouwhuijsen
- Born: 27 September 1968 (age 58) Leeuwarden, Netherlands

Cycling career
- Sport: Cycling
- Discipline: Road
- Role: Rider
Medal record
Representing Spain
Women's para-cycling
Road World Championships
Gold medal – first place	2024 Zurich	Time trial H1
Gold medal – first place	2025 Ronse	Time trial H1
Gold medal – first place	2026 Huntsville	Road race H1
Gold medal – first place	2025 Ronse	Road race H1
Silver medal – second place	2024 Zurich	Road race H1
Silver medal – second place	2026 Huntsville	Time trial H1
Road European Championships
Gold medal – first place	2026 Maniago	Road race H1
Gold medal – first place	2026 Maniago	Time trial H1

Manuela Vos van den Bouwhuijsen (Note: In this Spanish name, the first or paternal surname is Vos and the second or maternal family name is van den Bouwhuijsen.) (born 27 September 1968) is a Dutch-born Spanish para-cyclist who competes in handcycling. She has won multiple medals at the Road World Championships.

== Early life ==
Vos was born in Leeuwarden, Netherlands on 27 September 1968. In 1998, she emigrated to Spain.

== Career ==
Vos made her para-cycling debut in 2022 at a Copa de España event held in Ciudad Real.

In May 2024, Vos competed at the Road World Cup in Ostend, Belgium, winning two medals in the event. Several months later, she competed at the Road World Championships in Zurich, where she won a gold medal in the time trial H1 event with a time of 33:58:83, finishing seven minutes ahead of Luisa Pasini. As a result, she became the first Spanish woman to win a gold medal at the Para-cycling Road World Championships. She also won the silver medal in the road race in the same category, finishing behind Pasini.

At the 2025 Road World Championships held in Ronse, Belgium, Vos won the gold medal in the time trial H1 event with a time of 50:20.88, finishing ahead of Pokiza Akhmadbekova. She also competed in the road race in the same category where she won the gold medal, once again finishing ahead of Akhmadbekova.

Vos finished second the 2026 Road World Cup, in which she won at least four times at Belgium and Italy. In June 2026, she made er European Road Championships debut and won the gold medal in the road race and time trial. At the 2026 Road World Championships held in Huntsville, Alabama, U.S., Vos won the silver medal in the time trial H1 event with a time of 47:01.75, finishing behind Akhmadbekova. She also finished ahead of her in the road race where she won the gold medal.

== Personal life ==
Vos has three children and is a professional musician. On 5 July 2021, she fell while climbing in the Picos de Europa, leaving her quadriplegic in the process. She became a naturalized Spanish citizen in 2024.
