= Jean Emile Oosterlynck =

Belgian painter

Jean Emile Oosterlynck (1915–1996) was a Belgian (Flemish) painter who was born in Paris because of World War I. He studied at Courtrai and Anvers in Belgium. Influenced by Paul Klee, Oosterlynck looked to objects for their symbolic value – the dome of Sacre-Cœur against the Paris night sky, shuttered windows, the flutter of two birds in an embrace, the simple objects of a still life. His colors were strong and his objects are disposed in semi-abstract arrangements. An ability to create an image that imposes itself on the memory is perhaps his greatest gift. Oosterlynck took part in an exhibition of the association of artists called Centre artistique de la ville de Renaix/Kunstcentrum Ronse in 1958. Oosterlynck lived in Belgium until 1979, when he moved to and lived in Majorca, Spain, until his death.

== Bibliography ==
- P.-J. LACHAERT & Y. DEWOLF, De vergeten Ronsese kunstenaar Denis Célérier (1899-1970). Beeldende kunst in Ronse tussen 1938 en 1960, in: Annalen Geschiedkundige Kring Ronse, LXXI, 2022, p. 48.
