= Alex Welsh (cyclist) =

Australian para-cyclist (born 1991)

Personal information
- Full name: Alexander Welsh
- Nationality: Australian
- Born: 5 September 1991 (age 35) Korumburra, Australia

Sport
- Sport: Para-cycling
- Disability class: H3
Medal record
Men's para-cycling
Representing Australia
Road World Championships
Silver medal – second place	2025 Ronse	Mixed team relay H1–5

Alexander Welsh (born 5 September 1991) is an Australian para-cyclist.

== Early life ==
Welsh was a motocross racer and suffered a spinal cord injury in 2009 during a training accident.

== Career ==
On 3 July 2025, Welsh was selected to represent Australia at the 2025 UCI Para-cycling Road World Championships. This marked the first time the ARA Australian Cycling Team competed at the 2025 UCI Para-cycling Road World Championships in Ronse, in the mixed H team relay. He won a silver medal in the mixed team relay H1–5 with a time of 33:20. He finished 11th in the Men's Time Trial H3 and 14th in the Men's Road Race H3.
