= Francisco García Rus =

Spanish para-cyclist (born 1992)

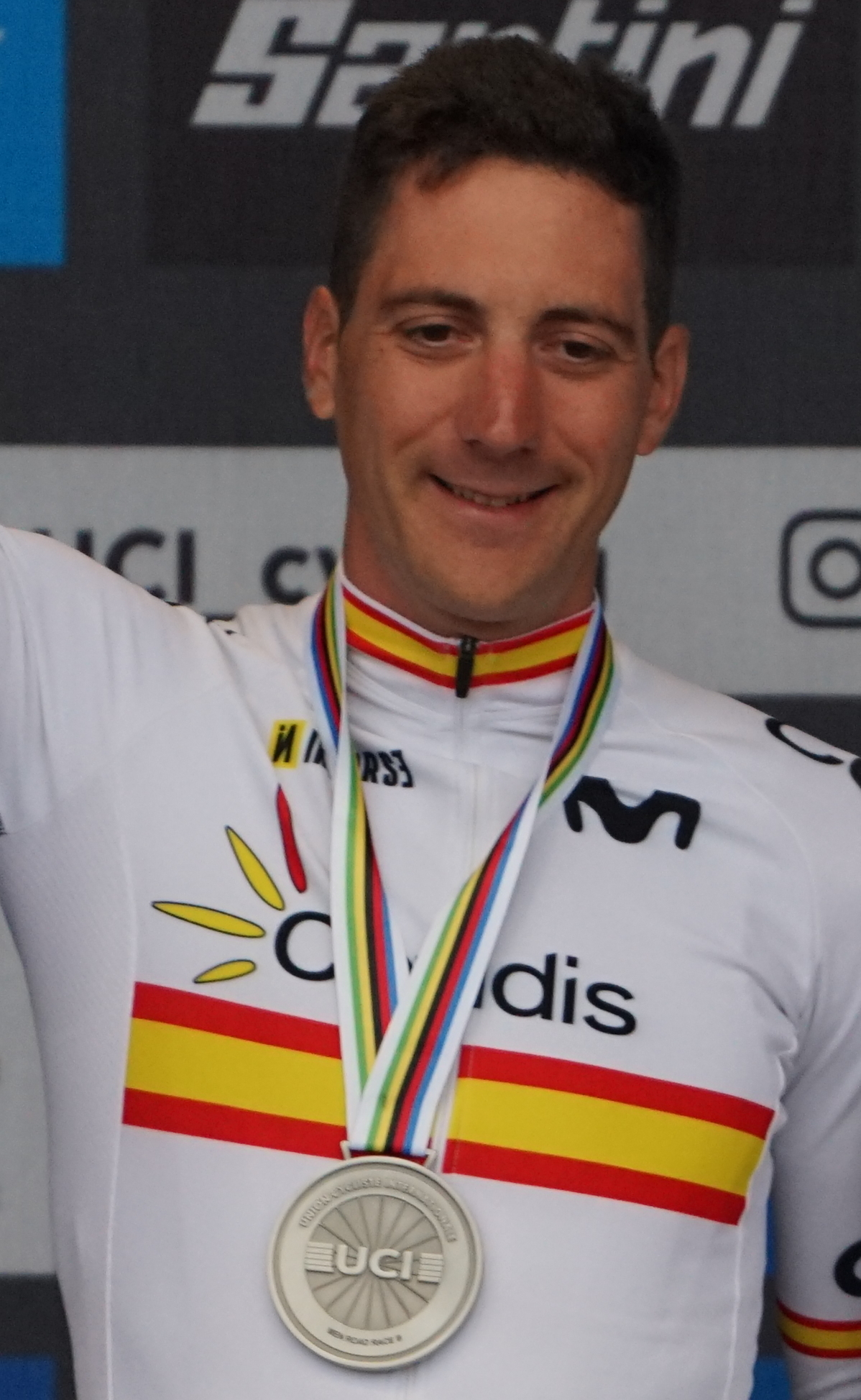
- García at the 2024 UCI Para-cycling Road World Championships

Personal information
- Nickname: Fran
- Born: 25 April 1992 (age 34) Caravaca de la Cruz, Spain
- Height: 1.84 m (6 ft 0 in)
- Weight: 78 kg (172 lb)

Cycling career
- Sport: Cycling
- Current team: Vigo–Rias Baixas
- Discipline: Road
- Role: Rider

Amateur teams
- 2010: Cajamar–Almería
- 2011: KTM–Murcia amateur
- 2012: Andalucía amateur
- 2013–2014: GSport–Valencia Sports–Wolfbike
- 2017–2018: GSport–Valencia Sports–Wolfbike
- 2020–2023: Aluminios Cortizo
- 2024–: Vigo–Rias Baixas

Professional team
- 2019: Ludofoods–Louletano
Medal record
Representing Spain
Men's para-cycling
Road World Championships
Silver medal – second place	2024 Zurich	Road race B
Bronze medal – third place	2024 Zurich	Time trial B

Francisco García Rus (born 25 April 1992) is a Spanish racing cyclist, who competes both in able-bodied events and as a para-cyclist in tandem cycling events as a sighted guide.

== Career ==
García Rus made his professional debut in 2019.

García Rus represented Spain at the 2024 UCI Para-cycling Road World Championships and won a silver medal in the road race B and a bronze medal in the time trial B, serving as a pilot for Imanol Arriortua Zorrilla.

== Major results ==
2010
1st Circuito Guadiana Juniors
2013
1st Ronda al Maestrazgo
2014
1st Stage 2 Vuelta a Navarra
1st Stage 1 Vuelta a Zamora
1st Stage 2 Vuelta a Palencia
1st Stage 2 Volta a Castelló
2nd Road race, National Under-23 Road Championships
2017
1st Memorial Pascual Momparler
1st Gran Premio Macario
1st Prologue Vuelta Ciclista a León
1st Stage 2 Vuelta a Alicante
1st Stage 3 Vuelta a la Provincia de Valencia
2018
1st Trofeo Ayuntamiento de Zamora
1st Stage 3 Volta a Lleida
1st Stage 3 Tour of Galicia
1st Prologue Vuelta a Zamora
1st Stage 1 Vuelta a la Provincia de Valencia
2021
1st Prologue Vuelta a Zamora
2022
1st Stage 4 Circuito Montañés
2023
1st Overall Mémorial Manuel Sanroma

1st Stage 1

1st Trofeo Ayuntamiento de Zamora
1st Clásica de la Chuleta
2024
1st Clásica de la Chuleta
UCI Para Road World Championships

2nd Road race B (with Imanol Arriortua Zorrilla)
3rd Time trial B (with Imanol Arriortua Zorrilla)
