= Sinead Greenan =

Irish para-cyclist (born 1992)

Personal information
- Born: 11 September 1992 (age 34) Cootehill, County Cavan, Ireland

Cycling career
- Sport: Cycling
- Discipline: Road
- Role: Rider
Medal record
Representing Ireland
Women's para-cycling
Road World Championships
Silver medal – second place	2026 Huntsville	Road race B
Silver medal – second place	2026 Huntsville	Time trial B
Road European Championships
Silver medal – second place	2026 Maniago	Road race B

Sinead Greenan (born 11 September 1992) is an Irish para-cyclist competing in tandem events.

== Early life ==
Born in Cootehill, County Cavan, Ireland, Greenan was born with congenital cataracts and glaucoma, requiring her to take daily medication. She is the daughter of Mark Greenan of Monaghan and his wife Andrea from Cootehill.

== Career ==
In the Belgium round of the 2026 UCI World Cup, Greenan won the bronze medal in the time trial and road race. In June 2026, she was selected by Cycling Ireland to competed in her first Road European Championships held in Maniago, Italy. Paired with Alice Sharpe, the tandem competed in the time trial, where they finished in fourth place, and in the road race, they won the silver medal. The following month, Greenan and Sharpe were named to the Irish team for the Road World Championships held in Huntsville, Alabama, U.S., a first for the former. At the aforementioned World Championships, the tandem won the silver medal in the time trial and road race.

== Personal life ==
As of 2026, Greenan is married to Colm Hill and resides in Mountbolus. She has also worked as a physiotherapist.

In January 2025, Greenan completed a solo journey in Sri Lanka spanning 840 km (520 mi) in order to fund Sightsavers Ireland.
