= Junyoung Park =

South Korean para-cyclist (born 1990)

Personal information
- Nationality: South Korean
- Born: 15 August 1990 (age 35)

Sport
- Sport: Para-cycling
- Disability class: T1
Medal record
Men's Para-cycling
Representing South Korea
Road World Championships
Silver medal – second place	2025 Ronse	Time trial T1
Silver medal – second place	2025 Ronse	Road race T1

Junyoung Park (born 15 August 1990) is a South Korean para-cyclist competing in T1 classification events.

== Career ==
At the opening round of the 2025 Road World Cup, Park won the silver medal in the road race event. In August 2025, he represented South Korea at the 2025 UCI Para-cycling Road World Championships and won a silver medal in the time trial T1 event with a time of 22:04,84, finishing behind Giorgio Farroni. He also competed in the road race T1 event, winning the silver medal, once again finishing behind Farroni.
