= Roland Cardon =

Belgian composer, pedagogue, flautist, clarinetist and multi-instrumentalist

- Born: 15 April 1929; Ronse, Belgium
- Died: 18 August 2001 (aged 72)
- Other names: Guy Rodenhof
- Occupation: musician

Roland Cardon (15 April 1929 – 18 August 2001) was a Belgian composer, pedagogue, flautist, clarinetist and multi-instrumentalist. He often published works under the name Guy Rodenhof.

After studies at the Ghent Conservatory, from 1955 he was a member of the long-lived band Chasseurs Ardennais in which he played solo flute. In the period 1963 to 1972 he was a lecturer in woodwind and orchestral music in the music school of Aarlen. From 1973 to 1982 he taught flute at the Music Academy in Vilvoorde. In addition, he taught at the Rijksmuziekacademie in Etterbeek in flute from 1973 to 1977. From 1974 to 1977 he was lecturer in the conducting of wind or fanfare orchestras at the Royal Conservatory of Brussels. From 1 January 1982 to 1 July 1994 he was director at the Municipal Conservatory of Ostend.

== Compositions ==
=== Orchestra ===
- Serenade, for strings
  1. Moderato
  2. Andante
  3. Allegro

=== Band ===
- 1968 Capriccio in Blue
- Ad Futurum
- Arlequino, ouverture in sonatenvorm
- Blue, sweet & swing, voor klarinettenkoor
- Childrens Symphony
- Claribel, voor klarinettenkoor
- Concertino, voor piano en harmonieorkest
- Cricket First
- Dance Party, suite
  1. Bossalero
  2. Tangentino
  3. Chachambo
  4. Salsamba
- Dear Harry
- De Engelbewaarders
- De Gilde
- Fantasia en Rondo, voor klarinettenkoor
- Go (marche)
- Goede Nacht - Tot Weerziens, voor gemengd koor en harmonieorkest
- Hello, voor harmonieorkest
- Het gulden ei
- Hooglede '78
- Intrada
- Izegem 900
- Jubilate
- La marche du souvenir
- Le Grand Manège
- Lovers Prayer, voor altsaxofoon solo en harmonieorkest
- Lullaby, voor klarinettenkoor
- Majorette-special
- Marche de la Légion Mobile
- Mauritiana
- Moods, voor klarinettenkoor
- Mozart, Weber & Co., voor klarinettenkoor
- Nuts City
- Ouverture 150, voor klarinettenkoor
- Pasticcio
- Prelude, voor klarinettenkoor
- Rondo Fantastico
- Saint-Pol sur Mer
- Serenade, voor klarinettenkoor
- The Way In
- Theme & Dance, voor klarinettenkoor
- Three Inventions, voor klarinettenkoor
- Time is over
- Vicennium

=== Chamber music ===
- Andante & Allegro Moderato, voor gitaar-ensemble
- B & J, duo voor trompet en klarinet
- Close-Up, voor slagwerk-ensemble
- Four Miniatures, voor saxofoon solo
- Introduction & Dance, voor basklarinet en piano
  1. Lento poco rubato
  2. Allegro con spirito
- Invertings, voor klarinet solo
  1. Lento poco rubato
  2. Allegro moderato
- Melopée & Dans, voor fluit en piano
- Siciliana, voor altsaxofoon en piano
- Three Shorty's, voor koperkwintet
  1. Allegro moderato
  2. Adagio
  3. Allegro giocoso

== Bibliography ==
- Francis Pieters: Van trompetsignaal tot muziekkapel, Kortrijk: VZW Muziek Centrum, 1981
- Wolfgang Suppan, Armin Suppan: Das Neue Lexikon des Blasmusikwesens, 4. Auflage, Freiburg-Tiengen, Blasmusikverlag Schulz GmbH, 1994, ISBN 3-923058-07-1
- Paul E. Bierley, William H. Rehrig: The heritage encyclopedia of band music : composers and their music, Westerville, Ohio: Integrity Press, 1991, ISBN 0-918048-08-7
- Norman E. Smith: March music notes, Lake Charles, La.: Program Note Press, 1986, ISBN 978-0-9617346-1-9
