= Patcharapha Seesen =

Thai para-cyclist (born 2005)

Personal information
- Born: 27 July 2005 (age 21)

Cycling career
- Sport: Cycling
- Discipline: Road
- Role: Rider
Medal record
Representing Thailand
Women's para-cycling
Road World Championships
Silver medal – second place	2025 Ronse	Time trial H2
Silver medal – second place	2025 Ronse	Road race H2

Patcharapha Seesen (born 27 July 2005) is a Thai para-cyclist who competes in the H2 category.

== Career ==
Making her Road World Championships debut, Patcharapha competed at the 2025 edition in Ronse, where she won a silver medal in the time trial H2 event with a time of 29:42,58, finishing behind Roberta Amadeo. She also competed in the road race in the same category where she won the silver medal, once again finishing behind Amadeo.
