= Amelia Cass =

British para-cyclist (born 1999)

Personal information
- Nickname: Millie
- Born: 27 April 1999 (age 27)

Sport
- Sport: Para-cycling
- Disability class: C2
Medal record
Women's para-cycling
Representing Great Britain
Road World Championships
Gold medal – first place	2026 Huntsville	Time trial C2
Bronze medal – third place	2023 Glasgow	Time trial C2
Bronze medal – third place	2024 Zurich	Time trial C2
Bronze medal – third place	2026 Huntsville	Road race C2
Track World Championships
Silver medal – second place	2026 Apeldoorn	Scratch race C2
Silver medal – second place	2026 Apeldoorn	Elimination C2
Road European Championships
Gold medal – first place	2026 Maniago	Time trial C2
Silver medal – second place	2026 Maniago	Road race C2

Amelia Cass (born 27 April 1999) is a British para-cyclist who competes in road and track events.

== Career ==
Cass made her international debut for Great Britain at the 2023 UCI Para-cycling Track World Championships in August 2023, and finished in seventh place in the individual pursuit C2 event. The next week she then competed at the 2023 UCI Para-cycling Road World Championships and won a bronze medal in the time trial C2 event.

In March 2024, she competed at the 2024 UCI Para-cycling Track World Championships and finished in fourth place in the individual pursuit C2 event. In September 2024, she then competed at the 2024 UCI Para-cycling Road World Championships and won a bronze medal in the time trial C2 event.

In June 2026, she competed at the 2026 UEC Para-cycling European Championships in Maniago, Italy, claiming gold in the C2 time trial and silver in the road race. In September 2026, she competed at the 2026 UCI Para-cycling Road World Championships, where she became a world champion finishing in first place in the C2 time trial. She also won a bronze medal in the road race.
