= Patrycja Kuter =

Polish para-cyclist (born 1993)

Personal information
- Nationality: Polish
- Born: 20 June 1993 (age 33)

Sport
- Sport: Para-cycling
- Disability: Vision impairment
Medal record
Representing Poland
Women's para-cycling
Road World Championships
Silver medal – second place	2025 Ronse	Road race B
European Championships
Gold medal – first place	2023 Rotterdam	Time trial B

Patrycja Kuter (born 20 June 1993) is a Polish para-cyclist who competes in tandem events. She represented Poland at the 2023 European Para Championships and the 2024 Summer Paralympics.

== Career ==
Kuter competed at the 2023 European Para Championships in cycling and won the gold medal in the time trial.

In September 2024, Kuter represented Poland at the 2024 Summer Paralympics in the time trial B event and the road race B event, finishing in eighth place in the latter. She also competed at the 2024 UCI Para-cycling Road World Championships in the road race and time trial B events, where she finished in fourth and seventh place respectively. She thus did not win a medal in either of them.

In August 2025, Kuter competed at the 2025 UCI Para-cycling Road World Championships with Karolina Kołkowicz serving as her sighted pilot. In the time trial event, she finished in eighth place, while in the road race event. she won the silver medal, which was her first in the championships.
