= Associated Weavers =

Manufacturer

Associated Weavers Europe
- Founded: 1964
- Founder: Trend Mills
- Headquarters: Industriezone Klein Frankrijk; Weverijstraat 1, 9600 Ronse
- Products: carpet
- Parent: Belgotex International Group
- Website: www.associated-weavers.com

Associated Weavers International Group is currently a Belgian textile manufacturing company. The company head office and production plant is located in Ronse.

== History ==
A company with the name "Associated Weavers" was founded in Bradford, West Yorkshire, England and run by the Abrahams family. By the early 1970s the site in Tong employed 2,500 people and was the world's largest producer of Axminster woven carpets and Europe's largest producer of tufted printed carpets. At that time the company was principally led by managing director Jack Collins, commercial director David Croft and the marketing and design director Michael Kelly.

In 1964, the American carpet manufacturer Trend Mills started producing carpet in Ronse, Belgium.

In 1969, an American concern Champion International took over the plant in Ronse and in 1973 the British Associated Weavers in Bradford. The production of tufted broadloom carpet was moved to the location in Ronse. Although at one time the company produced one in seven of all carpets bought in the UK, it was not a widely known brand name.

Due to a rapid contraction of the UK carpet sector the Bradford site was sold in the early 1980s; and in 1984 Champion International decided to withdraw from the carpet industry altogether. The result was a management buy-out, in 1984, followed by the establishment of the holding company "Associated Weavers International".

In 1990 the company acquired Prado, which was founded in 1909 as Tissage Van de Wiele as a weaving mill for furnishing fabrics, Prado makes both woven and tufted wall-to-wall carpet and rugs.

In 1997 the company registered on the Brussels Stock Exchange as the first Belgian carpet manufacturer.

In 1998 the company acquired a factory in Liberec, Czech Republic for mainly labour-intensive work such as finishing carpets and rugs.

In 2001 it took over the French company, Balsan, specialising in broadloom carpet for contract applications such as hotels, public buildings, schools, etc.

Since 2010, Associated Weavers International is part of Belgotex International Group.

== Change of strategy ==
Associated Weavers had been pursuing for years a volume strategy in the medium-low segment of the market and was seeking in vain to achieve satisfying business results.

The strategy was adjusted by a heavy emphasis on the development of trendy, value-for-money products brought into market via innovative marketing concepts. Investments were made in a complete rebranding, with the new logo integrating the tagline “Carpet your life” as the prime feature.

The slogan “Carpet your life” is no less than an invitation to the end consumer to choose a carpet from among a series of new collections offered in an inviting “Butterfly” display per colour, based on five universal life styles.

== Possible involvement in pollution by PFAS ==
Belgian newspapers published in September 2021 news about the pollution from PFAS in Ronse, linking it to the presence of textile industries in the town.
