= Andrea Ercolanelli =

French para-cyclist (born 2001)

Personal information
- Nationality: French
- Born: 20 June 2001 (age 25)

Sport
- Sport: Para-cycling
- Disability class: C2
Medal record
Men's para-cycling
Representing France
Road World Championships
Silver medal – second place	2025 Ronse	Road race C2

Andrea Ercolanelli (born 20 June 2001) is a French para-cyclist.

== Career ==
In August 2025, Ercolanelli represented France at the 2025 UCI Para-cycling Road World Championships and won a silver medal in the road race C2 event with a time of 1:34:09.
