= Josephine Rizos =

Irish para-cyclist (born 1995)

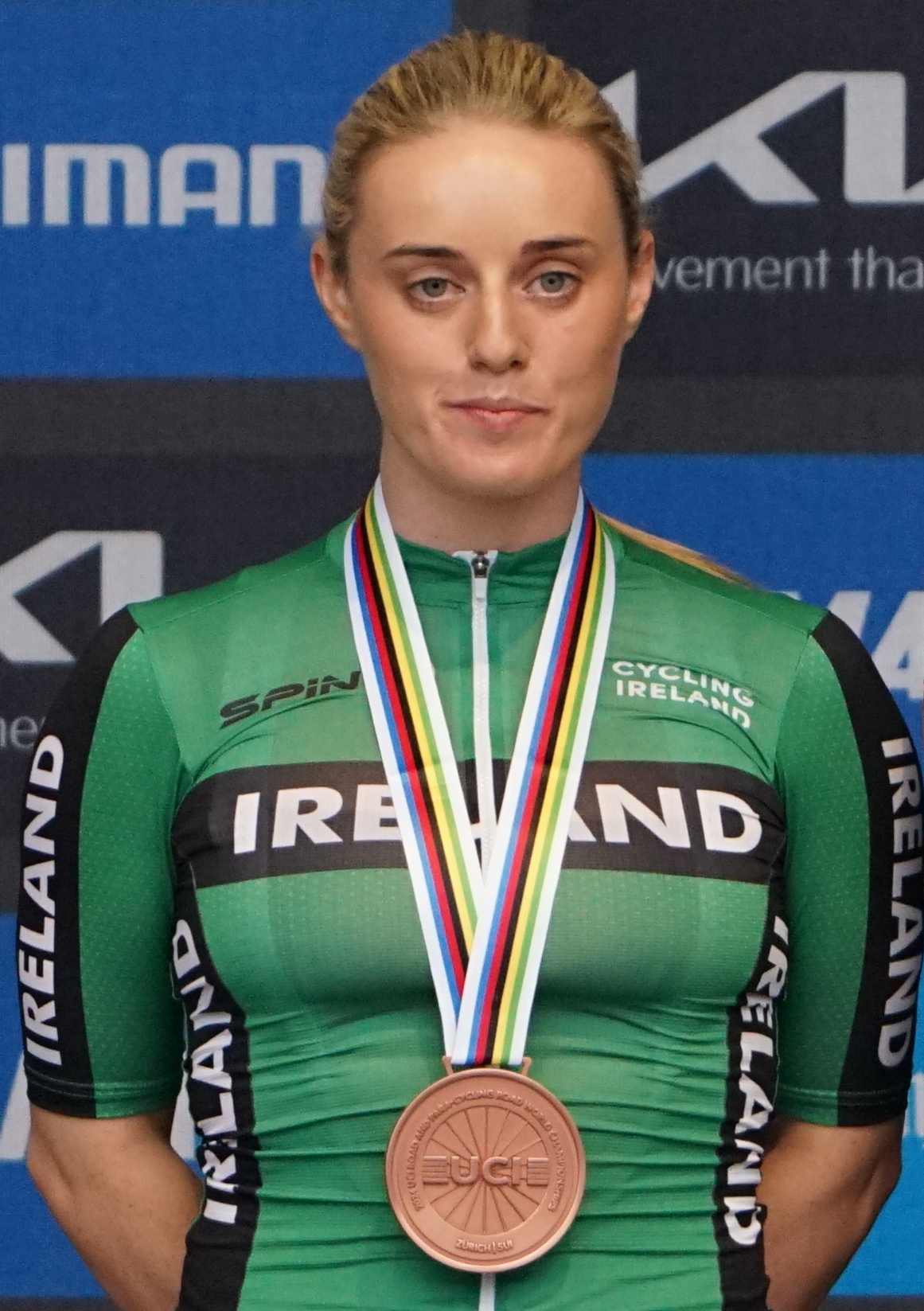
- Rizos at the 2024 Road World Championships

Personal information
- Nationality: Irish
- Born: Josephine Healion; 21 September 1995 (age 31)
- Home town: Tullamore, County Offaly, Ireland

Sport
- Sport: Para-cycling
- Disability class: B
Medal record
Women's para-cycling
Representing Ireland
Road World Championships
Bronze medal – third place	2022 Baie-Comeau	Road race B
Bronze medal – third place	2024 Zurich	Road race B
Track World Championships
Silver medal – second place	2026 Apeldoorn	Tandem B sprint

Josephine Rizos (née Healion; born 21 September 1995) is a visually impaired Irish para-cyclist who competes in tandem road and track events. She represented Ireland at the 2024 Summer Paralympics.

== Career ==
Healion made her international debut for Ireland at the 2022 UCI Para-cycling Road World Championships and won a bronze medal in the road race B event, along with her pilot, Linda Kelly. Since 2023, Healion has been piloted by Eve McCrystal in international road competitions and Linda Kelly in international track competitions.

In September 2024, Healion represented Ireland at the 2024 Summer Paralympics in road cycling and finished in fourth place in the road race B and fifth place in the road time trial B. She also competed in track cycling and finished in fifth pace in the individual pursuit B and seventh place in the time trial B. Weeks later she competed at the 2024 UCI Para-cycling Road World Championships and won a bronze medal in the road race B event.

In October 2026, she was selected to compete at the 2026 UCI Para-cycling Track World Championships. She won a silver medal in tandem B sprint.
