= Marjona Pardaboyeva =

Uzbekistani para-cyclist (born 2008)

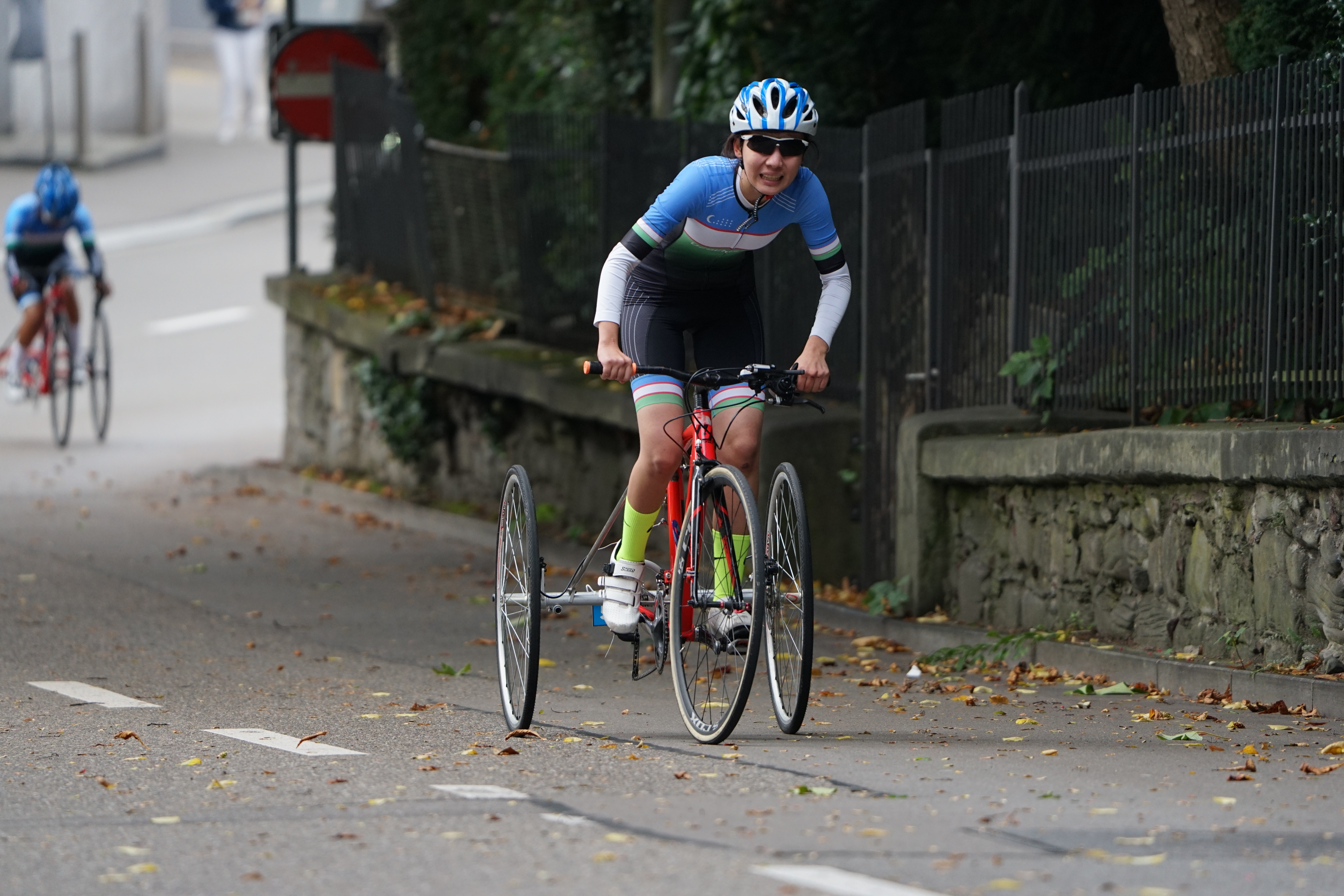
- Pardaboyeva at the 2024 UCI Para-cycling Road World Championships

Personal information
- Born: 13 April 2008 (age 18)

Cycling career
- Sport: Cycling
- Discipline: Road
- Role: Rider
Medal record
Representing Uzbekistan
Women's para-cycling
Road World Championships
| Silver medal – second place | 2025 Ronse | Time trial T1 |
| Silver medal – second place | 2025 Ronse | Road race T1 |
Asian Para Road Cycling Championships
| Gold medal – first place | 2025 Phitsanulok | Road race T1 |
| Silver medal – second place | 2025 Phitsanulok | Time trial T1 |

Marjona Pardaboyeva (born 13 April 2008) is an Uzbekistani para-cyclist who competes in the T1 category.

== Career ==
Making her Road World Championships debut, Pardaboyeva competed at the 2024 edition in Zurich in the road race and time trial T1 events, where she finished in sixth and last place in both of them.

Pardaboyeva competed in the Asian Para Road Cycling Championships in February 2025, winning gold in the road race and silver in the time trial. In May, she won the bronze medal in time trial and road race events in the Maniago round of the Road World Cup. She made her return to the Road World Championships, where she competed at the 2025 edition in Ronse. She won a silver medal in the time trial T1 event with a time of 0:48:59, finishing behind Marieke van Soest. She also competed in the road race in the same category where she won the silver medal, once again finishing behind van Soest.
