= Callum Russell =

British para-cyclist (born 1996)

Personal information
- Nationality: British
- Born: 17 April 1996 (age 30)

Sport
- Sport: Para-cycling
- Disability class: H4
- Event: Handcycling
Medal record
Representing Great Britain
Men's Para-cycling
Road World Championships
Gold medal – first place	2026 Huntsville	Road race H4
Silver medal – second place	2026 Huntsville	Time trial H4
Bronze medal – third place	2025 Ronse	Time trial H4
UCI Para-cycling Road World Cup
Bronze medal – third place	2026 Abruzzo	Time trial H4
Bronze medal – third place	2026 Abruzzo	Road race H4
Bronze medal – third place	2026 Gistel	Time trial H4
Bronze medal – third place	2025 Maniago	Road race H4
UEC Para-cycling Road European Championships
Bronze medal – third place	2026 Maniago	Road race H4

Callum Russell (born 17 April 1996) is a British para-cyclist who competes in the H4 handcycling classification.

== Career ==
=== 2024 ===
Russell made his international debut for Great Britain at the 2024 UCI Road and Para-cycling Road World Championships in Zürich, Switzerland. He finished fourth in the men's H4 time trial and fifth in the road race at his first world championships.

During the 2024 UCI Para-cycling Road World Cup, Russell finished eighth in the H4 road race and eleventh in the time trial at the Ostend round. At the Maniago round in Italy, he finished ninth in the time trial and twelfth in the road race. He also competed in the mixed handcycle team relay at both rounds.

=== 2025 ===
In 2025, Russell finished fifth in both the H4 time trial and road race at the Ostend–Bruges round of the 2025 UCI Para-cycling Road World Cup. At the Maniago round in Italy, he finished fifth in the time trial and won bronze in the road race.

British Cycling described Russell's bronze-medal performance in Maniago as the first World Cup medal won by a British male handcyclist.

At the 2025 UCI Para-cycling Road World Championships in Ronse, Belgium, Russell won bronze in the men's H4 time trial and finished fifth in the road race.

=== 2026 ===
In 2026, Russell won bronze in the H4 time trial at the Gistel round of the 2026 UCI Para-cycling Road World Cup and finished fourth in the road race. At the Abruzzo round in Italy, he won bronze in both the time trial and road race.

At the 2026 UEC Para-cycling Road European Championships in Maniago, Italy, Russell finished fourth in the H4 time trial and won bronze in the road race.

At the 2026 UCI Para-cycling Road World Championships in Huntsville, Alabama, Russell won silver in the men's H4 time trial before winning gold in the H4 road race. The road-race victory gave Russell his first UCI world title.

== Major results ==
Year	Competition	Event	Result
2024	UCI Para-cycling Road World Cup – Ostend	H4 road race	8th
2024	UCI Para-cycling Road World Cup – Ostend	H4 time trial	11th
2024	UCI Para-cycling Road World Cup – Ostend	Mixed handcycle team relay	13th
2024	UCI Para-cycling Road World Cup – Maniago	H4 time trial	9th
2024	UCI Para-cycling Road World Cup – Maniago	H4 road race	12th
2024	UCI Para-cycling Road World Cup – Maniago	Mixed handcycle team relay	10th
2024	UCI Para-cycling Road World Championships	H4 time trial	4th
2024	UCI Para-cycling Road World Championships	H4 road race	5th
2025	UCI Para-cycling Road World Cup – Ostend–Bruges	H4 time trial	5th
2025	UCI Para-cycling Road World Cup – Ostend–Bruges	H4 road race	5th
2025	UCI Para-cycling Road World Cup – Maniago	H4 time trial	5th
2025	UCI Para-cycling Road World Cup – Maniago	H4 road race	3rd
2025	UCI Para-cycling Road World Championships	H4 time trial	3rd
2025	UCI Para-cycling Road World Championships	H4 road race	5th
2026	UCI Para-cycling Road World Cup – Gistel	H4 time trial	3rd
2026	UCI Para-cycling Road World Cup – Gistel	H4 road race	4th
2026	UCI Para-cycling Road World Cup – Abruzzo	H4 time trial	3rd
2026	UCI Para-cycling Road World Cup – Abruzzo	H4 road race	3rd
2026	UEC Para-cycling Road European Championships	H4 time trial	4th
2026	UEC Para-cycling Road European Championships	H4 road race	3rd
2026	UCI Para-cycling Road World Championships	H4 time trial	2nd
2026	UCI Para-cycling Road World Championships	H4 road race	1st

== Personal life ==
Russell is a former mountain biker who suffered a spinal injury in March 2018 during a race.

Following his injury, he joined Great Britain's Pararowing team before transitioning to Para-cycling.
