= Eliott Pierre =

French para-cyclist (born 2001)

Personal information
- Nationality: French
- Born: 18 January 2001 (age 25)

Sport
- Sport: Para-cycling
- Disability class: C5
Medal record
Men's para-cycling
Representing France
Road World Championships
Bronze medal – third place	2025 Ronse	Road race C5

Eliott Pierre (born 18 January 2001) is a French para-cyclist. He represented France at the 2025 UCI Para-cycling Road World Championships and won a bronze medal in the road race C5 event with a time of 2:11:29.
