= Felix Barrow =

British Para-cyclist (born 2004)

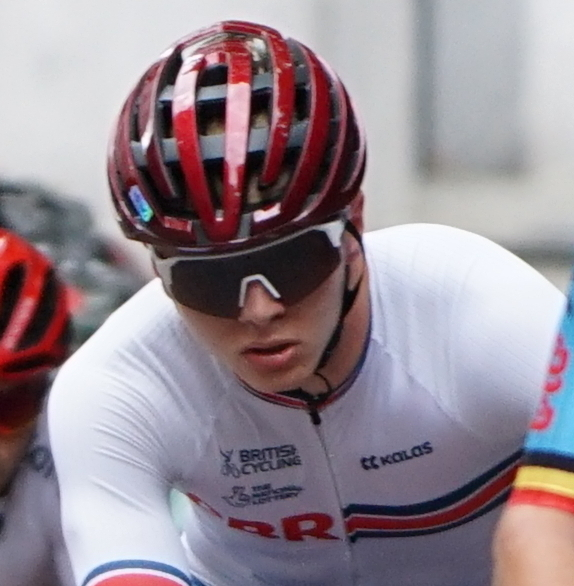
- Barrow during the 2024 World Championships

Personal information
- Nationality: British
- Born: 18 August 2004 (age 21)

Sport
- Sport: Para-cycling
- Disability class: T2
Medal record
Men's para-cycling
Representing Great Britain
Road World Championships
Gold medal – first place	2024 Zurich	Time trial T2
Bronze medal – third place	2023 Glasgow	Time trial T2
Bronze medal – third place	2025 Ronse	Road race T2

Felix Barrow (born 18 August 2004) is a British Para-cyclist.

== Early life ==
Growing up, Barrow was a swimmer and triathlete for the Chapel TriStars junior triathlon club.

== Career ==
Barrow made his international debut for Great Britain at the 2023 UCI Para-cycling Road World Championships and won a bronze medal in the time trial T2 event. He again represented Great Britain at the 2024 UCI Para-cycling Road World Championships and won a gold medal in the time trial T2 event with a time of 16:28.66, finishing 34.84 seconds ahead of silver medalist Tim Celen.

== Personal life ==
In October 2015 Barrow was hit by a car while walking to Swanmore College. His injuries included a broken leg and a dislocated elbow, knee and ankle, and a traumatic brain injury which affects his speech. He was airlifted to Southampton General Hospital and spent four weeks in the intensive care unit in an induced coma, followed by four weeks in the high-dependency unit.
