= Barry Wilcox (cyclist) =

American para-cyclist (born 1978)

Personal information
- Born: July 10, 1978 (age 48) Port Angeles, Washington, U.S.

Sport
- Sport: Para-cycling
- Disability class: H1
Medal record
Men's para-cycling
Representing the United States
Road World Championships
| Silver medal – second place | 2025 Ronse | Road race H1 |
| Bronze medal – third place | 2023 Glasgow | Road race H1 |

Barry Wilcox (born July 10, 1978) is an American para-cyclist.

== Early life ==
Wilcox was involved in a car accident at 16 years old, which resulted in broken C6 and C7 vertebrae, a spinal cord injury and multiple skull fractures.

== Career ==
Wilcox made his Road World Championships debut in 2023, and won a bronze medal in the road race H1 event. In August 2025, he represented the United States at the 2025 UCI Para-cycling Road World Championships and won a silver medal in the road race H1 event.

== Personal life ==
Wilcox is a clinical exercise physiologist and instructor at Park University in Gilbert, Arizona.
