= Imanol Arriortua =

Austrian para-cyclist (born 1998)

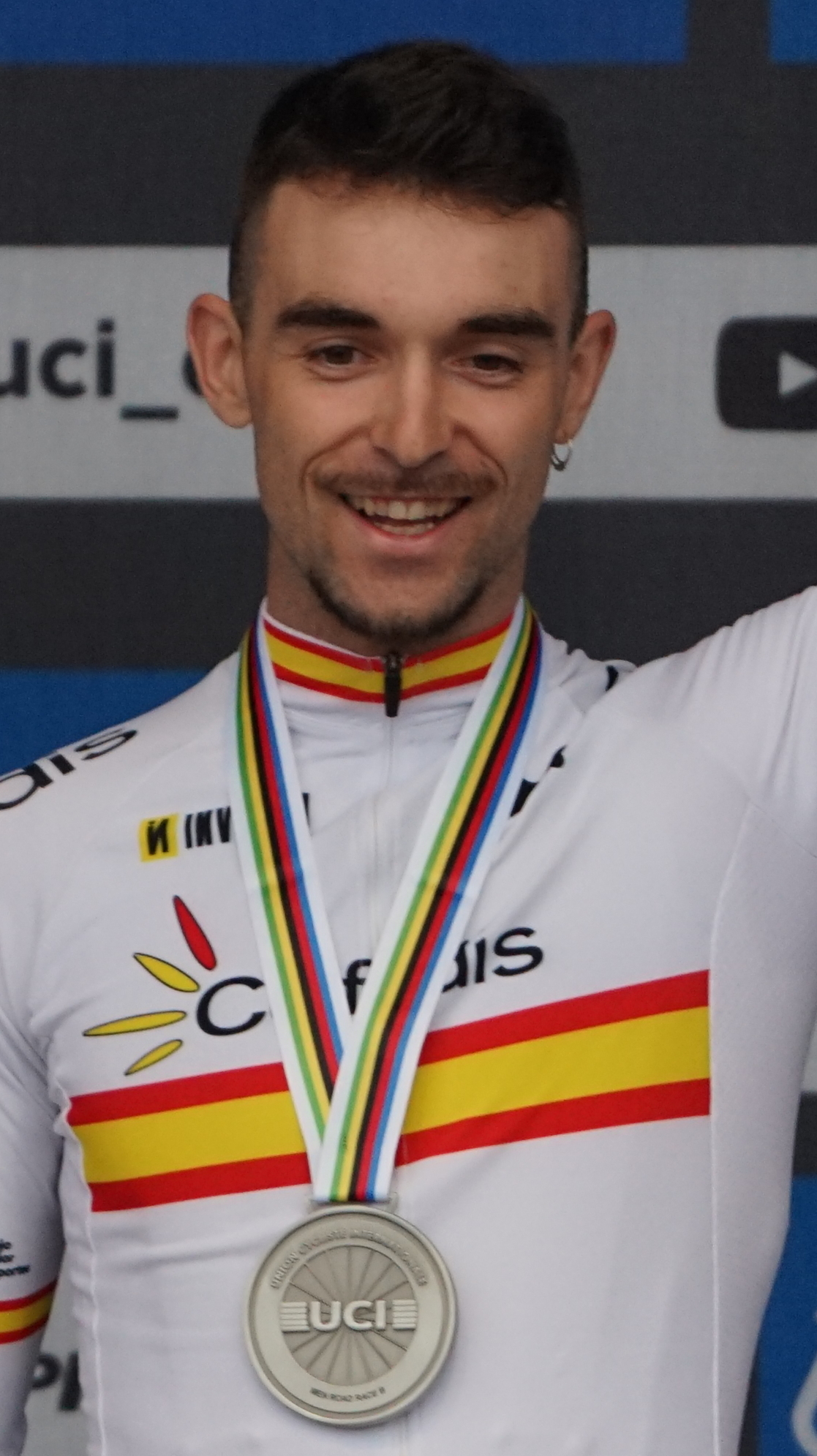
- Arriortua at the 2024 UCI Para-cycling Road World Championships

Personal information
- Full name: Imanol Arriortua Zorrilla
- Nationality: Spanish
- Born: 12 May 1998 (age 28)

Sport
- Sport: Para-cycling
- Disability class: B
Medal record
Representing Spain
Men's para-cycling
Road World Championships
Silver medal – second place	2024 Zurich	Road race B
Bronze medal – third place	2024 Zurich	Time trial B

Imanol Arriortua Zorrilla (born 12 May 1998) is a Spanish visually impaired para-cyclist who competes in tandem cycling events.

== Career ==
Arriortua Zorrilla began para-cycling in 2024. He represented Spain at the 2024 UCI Para-cycling Road World Championships and won a silver medal in the road race B and a bronze medal in the time trial B, along with his pilot Francisco García Rus.
