= Linda Kelly (cyclist) =

Irish para-cyclist

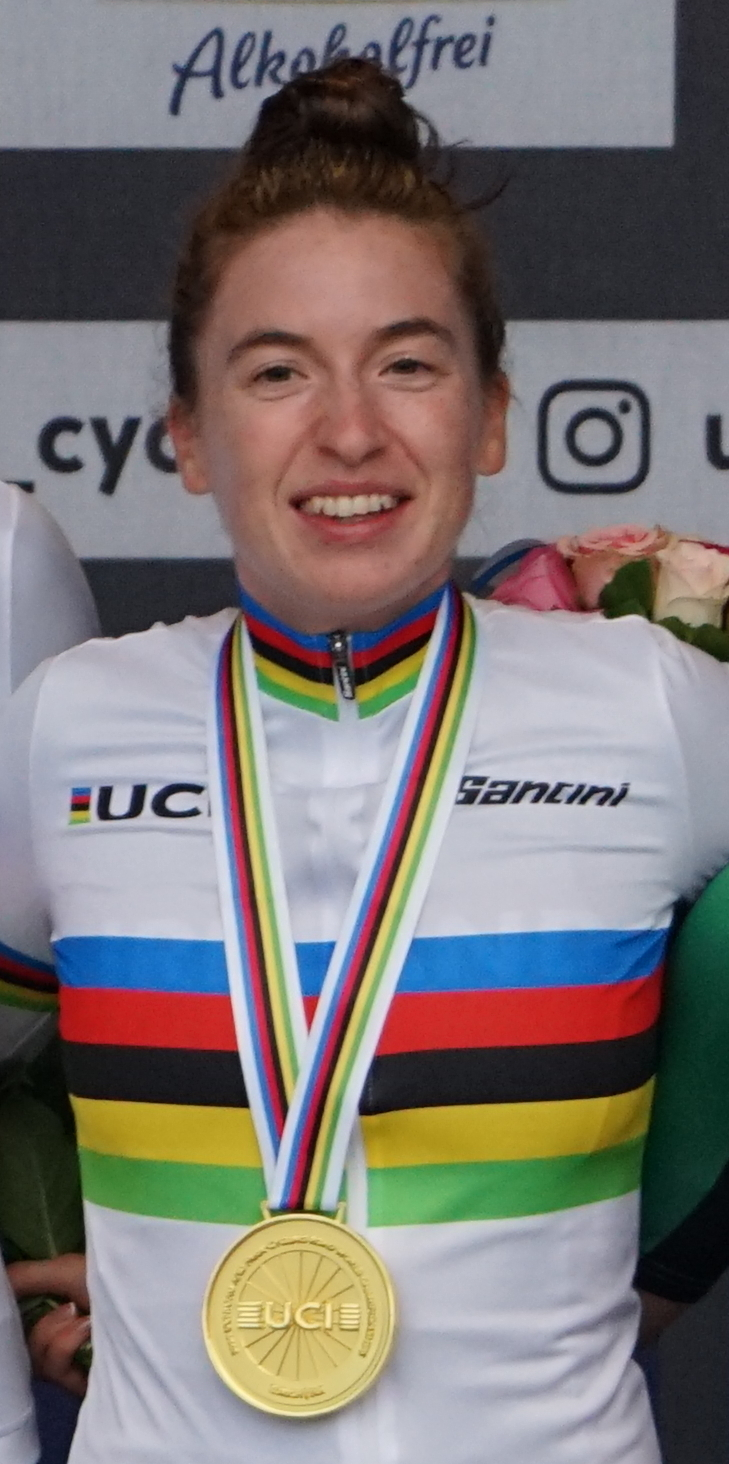
- Kelly at the 2024 UCI Para-cycling Road World Championships

Personal information
- Born: Ireland

Cycling career
- Sport: Cycling
- Disciplines: Road; Para-cycling
- Role: Rider
- Rider type: Tandem pilot

Amateur team
- Spin the Bean
Medal record
Women's para-cycling
Representing Ireland
Paralympic Games
Gold medal – first place	2024 Paris	Time trial B
Silver medal – second place	2024 Paris	Road race B
UCI Para-cycling Road World Championships
Gold medal – first place	2023 Glasgow	Time trial B
Gold medal – first place	2023 Glasgow	Road race B
Gold medal – first place	2024 Zurich	Time trial B
Gold medal – first place	2024 Zurich	Road race B
Gold medal – first place	2026 Huntsville	Time trial (B)
Bronze medal – third place	2022 Baie-Comeau	Road race B
Road European Championships
Gold medal – first place	2026 Maniago	Time Trial
Bronze medal – third place	2026 Maniago	Road Race

Linda Kelly is an Irish para-cyclist guide competing in tandem events for Ireland, as a sighted pilot for blind cyclists. She is a Paralympic Champion.

== Early life ==
Kelly grew up in New Ross.

== Career ==
Kelly began to cycle as a tandem pilot in 2022. She won bronze at the 2022 UCI Para-cycling Road World Championships as pilot to Josephine Healion. She then won two gold medals at the 2023 UCI Para-cycling Road World Championships as pilot to Katie-George Dunlevy.

She won gold at the 2024 Summer Paralympics in Paris in the time trial B event, as a sighted pilot for Katie-George Dunlevy.
