= Christian Gyldenøhr =

Danish-Norwegian footballer and para-cyclist (born 1985)

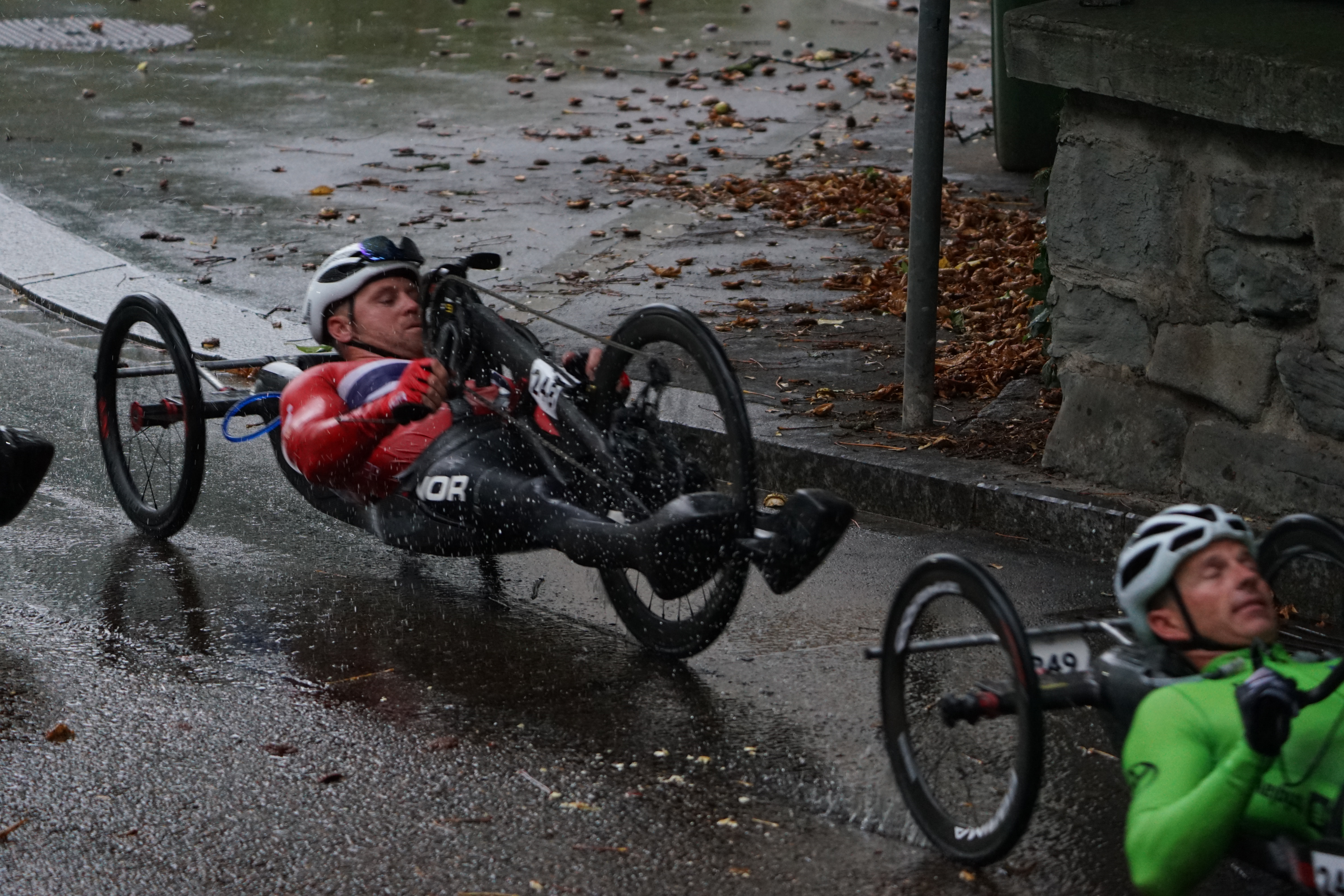
- Christian Gyldenøhr during the 2024 World Championships

Personal information
- Born: 21 October 1985 (age 41)
Association football career
- Position: Centre-back
Senior career*
Years	Team	Apps	(Gls)
2001–2003	Ikast		
2003	Skive		
2003–2005	Holstebro		
2005–2007	Skive		
2007–2010	Ikast		
2010–2013	Brønshøj		
- * Club domestic league appearances and goals

Sport
- Sport: Para-cycling; football
- Disability class: H3
Medal record
Men's para-cycling
Representing Norway
Road World Championships
Bronze medal – third place	2024 Zurich	Road race H3

Christian Gyldenøhr (born 21 October 1985) is a Norwegian para-cyclist who competes in road events and a Danish former footballer who played as a centre-back. As a cyclist, he is a medalist at the UCI Para-cycling Road World Championships.

== Club career ==
Gyldenøhr began his senior football career in 2001 with Ikast. He went on to play for Skive, Holstebro and Brønshøj before retiring in 2013 as a result of his injuries.

== Cycling career ==
After his football career ended, Gyldenøhr moved to Norway. On 24 August 2019, Gyldenøhr was injured in a car accident which left him paralyzed, after which he took up para-cycling.

In January 2024, Gyldenøhr competed at the World Cup in Adelaide, where he won the time trial and finished in second place in the road race. In September, at the Road World Championships, he competed in the time trial, where he finished in seventh place, and the road race, where he won the bronze medal in the C3 classification.
