= Sandra Fuhrer =

Swiss para-cyclist (born 1986)

Personal information
- Born: 27 June 1986 (age 40) Switzerland

Cycling career
- Sport: Cycling
- Discipline: Road
- Role: Rider
Medal record
Women's para-cycling
Representing Switzerland
Road World Championships
Gold medal – first place	2025 Ronse	Road race H4
Bronze medal – third place	2024 Zurich	Road race H4

Sandra Fuhrer (born 27 June 1986) is a Swiss para-cyclist who competes in road events. She is a bronze medalist at the Road World Championships.

== Career ==
In September 2024, Fuhrer competed at the Road World Championships. There, she finished in ninth place in the time trial H4 event won a bronze medal in the road race H4 event.

In August 2025, Fuhrer competed at the Road World Championships. She competed in the road race H4 event in which she won.
