= Franziska Matile-Dörig =

Swiss para-cyclist (born 1992)

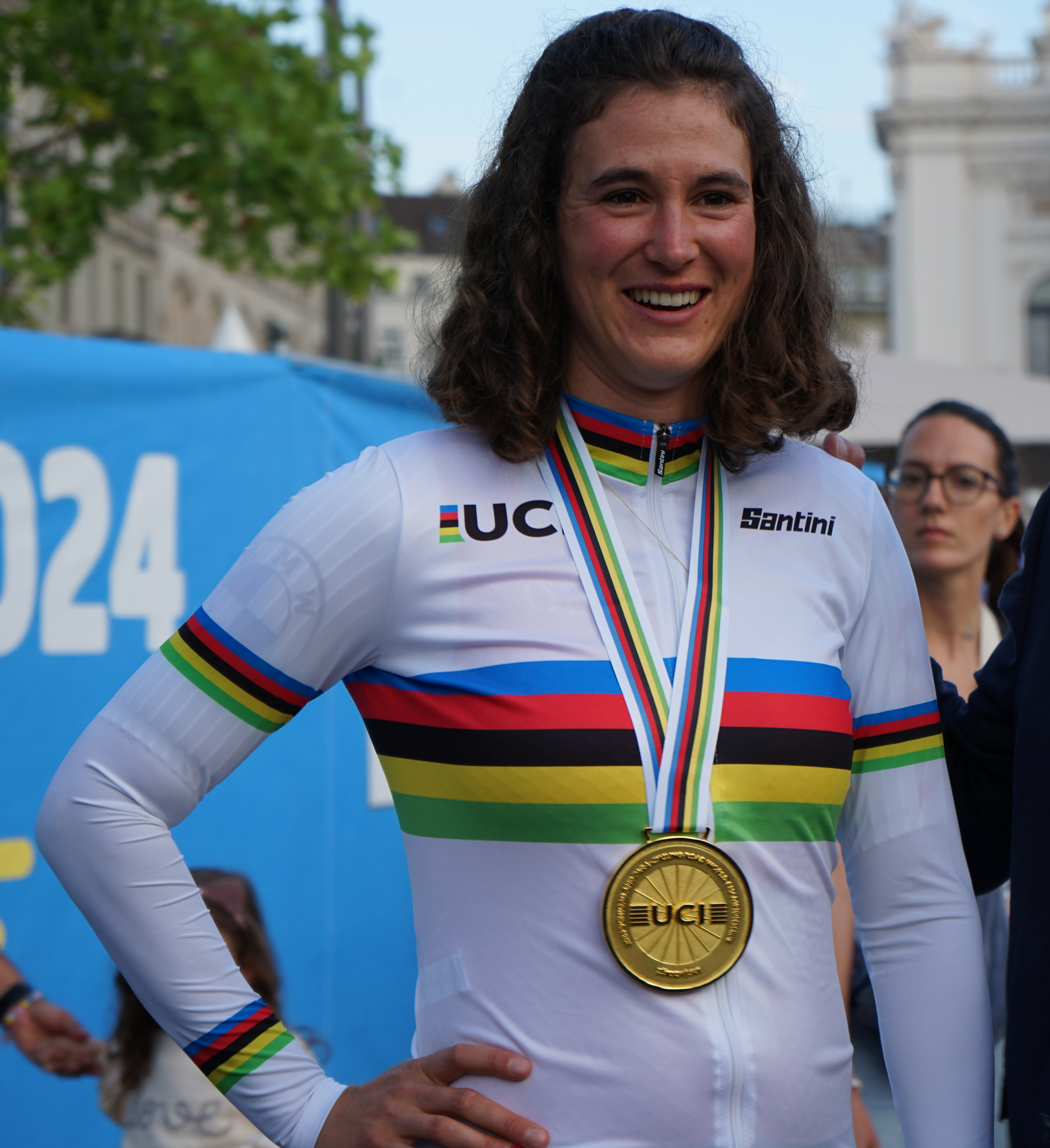
- Matile-Dörig winning gold at the 2024 UCI Para-cycling Road World Championships

Personal information
- Born: 26 March 1992 (age 34)
- Home town: Winterthur, Switzerland

Sport
- Country: Switzerland
- Sport: Para-cycling
- Disability class: C4
- Event(s): Road cycling, track cycling
Medal record
Para-cycling
Paralympic Games
Bronze medal – third place	2024 Paris	Road time trial C4
Road World Championships
Gold medal – first place	2024 Zurich	Time trial C4
Silver medal – second place	2024 Zurich	Road race C4
Track World Championships
Silver medal – second place	2023 Glasgow	Scratch race C4
Bronze medal – third place	2023 Glasgow	Omnium C4
Bronze medal – third place	2024 Rio de Janeiro	Scratch race C4
European Para Championships
Gold medal – first place	2023 Rotterdam	Road time trial C4
Gold medal – first place	2023 Rotterdam	Road race C4

Franziska Matile-Dörig (born 26 March 1992) is a Swiss para-cyclist.

== Sporting career ==
Matile-Dörig was a competitive orienteering athlete. After a long injury break, she retired as a squad athlete, but continued running, mountain sports, ski touring and trail running. She worked as a physiotherapist and trained as an outdoor guide. In a traffic accident in April 2021, she suffered broken bones in both feet. Her left foot was subsequently stiff and deformed. As part of her rehabilitation, she was suggested to take up cycling.

In 2022, Matile-Dörig took part in her first paracycling race in Brugg and came into contact with national coach Dany Hirs, who has been training her ever since. She achieved her first podium finish in the Paracycling World Cup in Maniago, Italy, finishing third in the individual time trial. In 2023 she won four medals: At the European Road Championships she became two-time European champion in time trial and road race. At the World Track Championships she won silver in the scratch and bronze in the omnium.

== Awards and honors ==
In 2023, Matile-Dörig was honored with the Newcomer Award at the Swiss Paralympic Night.
