= Louis Hubert =

French para-cyclist (born 2007)

Personal information
- Nationality: French
- Born: 21 February 2007 (age 19)

Sport
- Sport: Para-cycling
- Disability class: C3
Medal record
Men's Para-cycling
Representing France
Road World Championships
Silver medal – second place	2025 Ronse	Time trial C3

Louis Hubert (born 21 February 2007) is a French para-cyclist.

== Career ==
In August 2025, Hubert represented France at the 2025 UCI Para-cycling Road World Championships and won a silver medal in the time trial C3 event with a time of 30:14.89.
