= Joan Sansó Riera =

Spanish para-cyclist (born 2000)

Personal information
- Nationality: Spanish
- Born: 9 August 2000 (age 25)

Sport
- Sport: Para-cycling
- Disability: Vision impairment
- Disability class: B
Medal record
Men's para-cycling
Representing Spain
Road World Championships
Silver medal – second place	2025 Ronse	Road race B

Joan Sansó Riera (born 9 August 2000) is a Spanish para-cyclist who competes in tandem events.

== Career ==
In August 2025, Sansó Riera represented Spain at the 2025 UCI Para-cycling Road World Championships and won a silver medal in the road race B event, along with his pilot, Eloy Teruel, with a time of 2:05:30.
