= Thomas Tarou =

French para-cyclist (born 1984)

Personal information
- Nationality: French
- Born: 18 October 1984 (age 41)

Sport
- Sport: Para-cycling
- Disability class: C1
Medal record
Men's Para-cycling
Representing France
Road World Championships
Gold medal – first place	2025 Ronse	Road race C1

Thomas Tarou (born 18 October 1984) is a French para-cyclist competing in C1 classification events.

== Career ==
In August 2025, Tarou was selected to represent France at the 2025 UCI Para-cycling Road World Championships. He finished in fourth place in the time trial event, while in the road race event, he won the gold medal, his first in the Road World Championships.
