= Shawn Morelli =

American Paralympic cyclist

Personal information
- Born: March 29, 1976 (age 50) Greenville, Pennsylvania, U.S.

Cycling career
- Sport: Cycling
Medal record
Women's para-cycling
Representing the United States
Paralympic Games
Gold medal – first place	2016 Rio de Janeiro	Pursuit C4
Gold medal – first place	2016 Rio de Janeiro	Road time trial C4
Gold medal – first place	2020 Tokyo	Road time trial C4
Silver medal – second place	2020 Tokyo	Pursuit C4
Track World Championships
Bronze medal – third place	2025 Rio de Janeiro	Scratch race C4

Shawn Morelli (born March 29, 1976) is an American para-cyclist. She is a three-time gold medalist in cycling at the 2016 and 2020 Summer Paralympics, winning four overall medals in both road and track cycling.

== Early life and education ==
Morelli was born March 29, 1976, in Greenville, Pennsylvania, and grew up in Saegertown, Pennsylvania. In 1996, she attended Marion Military Institute, where she graduated with a commission as a Second Lieutenant engineer officer in the United States Army. In 1998, she graduated from Penn State University with a major in history.

== Career ==
Morelli is a veteran of Operation Iraqi Freedom and the war in Afghanistan. She retired as a Major in the United States Army.

After being injured in 2007, she began competitive para-cycling in 2010 and has participated in world championships since 2014.

== Personal life ==
Morelli resides in Leavenworth, Kansas.

== See also ==
- List of Pennsylvania State University Olympians
