= Keely Shaw =

Canadian cyclist (born 1994)

Personal information
- Born: July 18, 1994 (age 32) Midale, Saskatchewan, Canada

Cycling career
- Sport: Cycling
- Discipline: Track cycling
Medal record
Women's track cycling
Representing Canada
Paralympic Games
Bronze medal – third place	2020 Tokyo	Individual pursuit C4
Bronze medal – third place	2024 Paris	Individual pursuit C4
Track World Championships
Silver medal – second place	2019 Apeldoorn	Individual pursuit C4
Silver medal – second place	2023 Glasgow	Individual pursuit C4
Bronze medal – third place	2024 Rio de Janeiro	Individual pursuit C4
Road World Championships
Bronze medal – third place	2022 Baie-Comeau	Time trial C4
Bronze medal – third place	2022 Baie-Comeau	Road race C4
Bronze medal – third place	2023 Glasgow	Time trial C4
Parapan American Games
Silver medal – second place	2023 Santiago	Individual pursuit C4–5

Keely Shaw (born July 18, 1994) is a Canadian track cyclist. She represented Canada at the 2020 and 2024 Summer Paralympics.

== Early life and education ==
Shaw was born on July 18, 1994 to parents Carol and Greg Toles. She grew up on a farm in Midale, Saskatchewan. At age 15 in 2009, she was involved in a horse-riding accident resulting in partial paralysis on her left side. She became interested in parasport in university.

Shaw graduated from University of Saskatchewan with a bachelor's degree in kinesiology in 2016. She then went on to complete a master's degree at the University of Saskatchewan in the area of exercise physiology and sport nutrition with a thesis titled "The Effect of Dark Chocolate on Metabolism and Performance in Trained Cyclists at Simulated Altitude". She continued her education with a Ph.D., also at the University of Saskatchewan in exercise physiology and sport nutrition with a special focus on sport nutrition for special populations, namely female, master's, and Paralympic athletes. Shaw defended her thesis in December 2023.

== Career ==
Shaw began her cycling career in May 2017, competing in road race in Moose Jaw, and winning her first medal at a national championship a year later. She made a quick jump to the National team, earning a 5th place in the Individual pursuit in the women's C4 category at Paracycling Track World Championships in 2018 before earning her first World Championship podium in 2019 at the UCI Para-cycling Track World Championships. In 2021, she made her Paralympics debut, where she won a bronze medal in the individual pursuit C4 event with a time of 3:48.342 She was named the Sask Sport Female Athlete of the Year Award for 2021.

Shaw won two bronze medals at the 2022 UCI Para-cycling Road World Championships, one in the women's C4 70.2-kilometre road race and one in the women's C4 time trial. At the 2023 UCI Para-cycling Road World Championships, Shaw won bronze in the women's C4 individual time trial. She won silver in the women's C4 individual pursuit at the 2023 UCI Para-cycling Track World Championships. At the 2024 UCI Para-cycling Track World Championships, she won a bronze medal in the women's C4 individual pursuit. She placed ninth in the 500m time trial.

Shaw was selected to compete in para-cycling for Canada at the 2024 Summer Paralympics, and won a bronze medal in the individual pursuit C4 event.
