= Rita Malinkiewicz =

Polish cyclist (born 1995)

Personal information
- Born: 28 March 1995 (age 31)

Cycling career
- Sport: Cycling
- Discipline: Road
- Role: Rider
Medal record
Representing Poland
Women's para-cycling
Road World Championships
| Silver medal – second place | 2025 Ronse | Road race T2 |

Rita Malinkiewicz (born 28 March 1995) is a Polish cyclist, specializing primarily in mountain biking until her accident in 2020, after which she switched to road biking in para-cycling.

== Career ==
In 2017, Malinkiewicz competed in the MTB Marathon World Championships, but did not finish. She has also competed in several international championship events in younger age categories in cross-country. In 2016, she did not finish the U21 World Championships, and in the European Championships, she finished 15th in the same category. In 2015, she finished 20th in the European Championships in the same category. In the junior competition in 2013, she placed 21st and in 2012 37th. She has also competed several times in the U23 and junior (under 23) cross-country Mountain Bike World Cup, achieving her best result in August 2015 in Val di Sole, where she finished 29th in the youth competition.

Malinkiewicz has twice won medals at the Polish Senior Mountain Bike Championships – in 2014, she won silver in the marathon and in 2016, bronze in the sprint. She has also stood on the podium at the Polish National Mountain Bike Championships in younger age categories in cross-country – in 2013, she became the Polish Junior Champion, and in 2011, she won a bronze medal at the Polish Junior Championships. On 1 June 2020, in Wilkowice, Malinkiewicz suffered serious injuries in an accident in which she and another cyclist were involved in a head-on collision with a passenger car.

At the 2025 Road World Championships, Malinkiewicz competed in the time trial and road race T2 events, where in the latter, she won the silver medal, finishing behind Celine van Till.
