= Anna Taylor (cyclist) =

New Zealand para cyclist

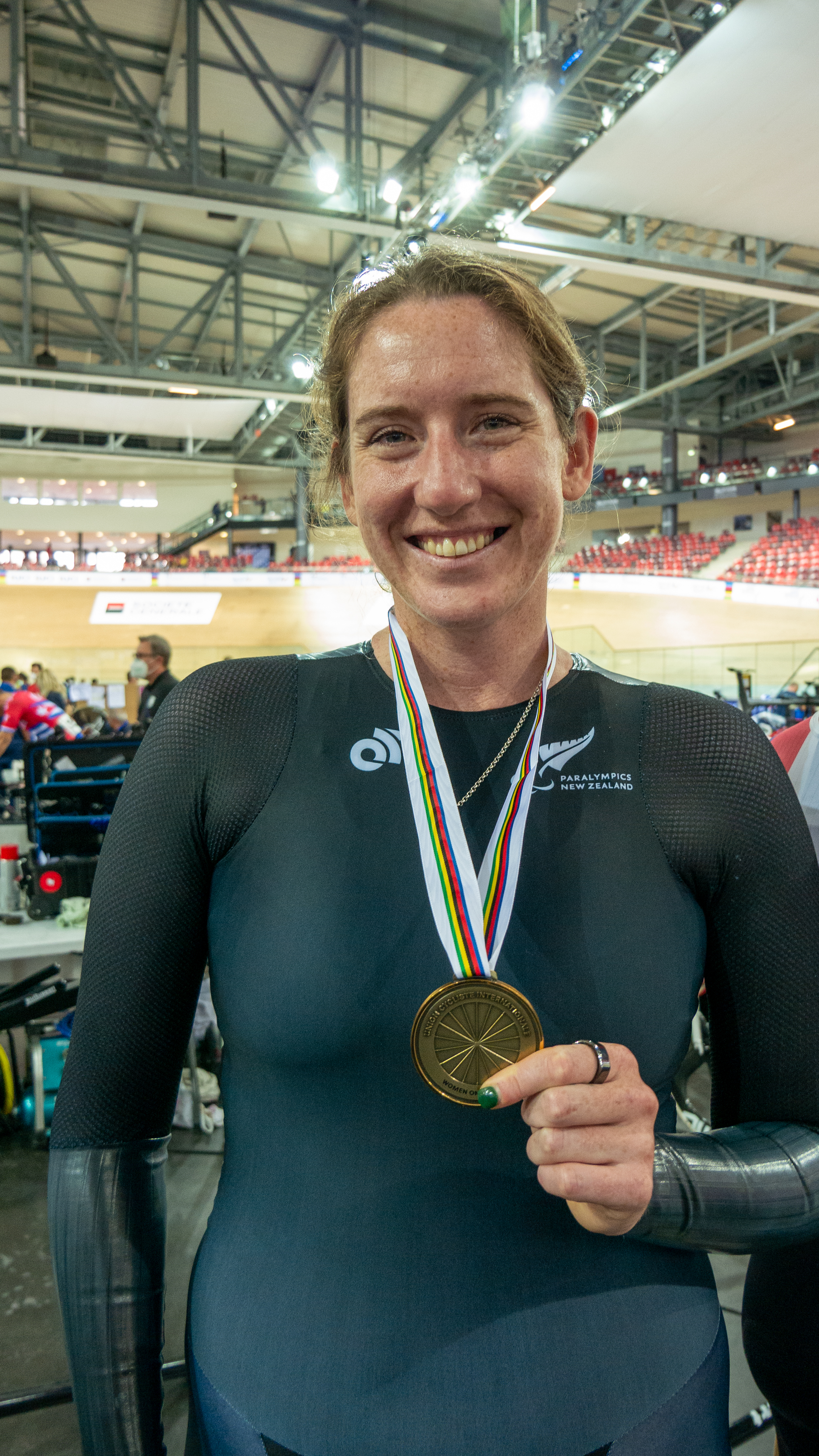

Personal information
- Full name: Anna Grace Taylor
- Born: 7 August 1991 (age 35)

Sport
- Country: New Zealand
- Sport: Para-cycling
- Disability class: C4
Medal record
Paralympic Games
Silver medal – second place	2024 Paris	Pursuit C4
Track World Championships
Gold medal – first place	2023 Glasgow	Omnium C4
Bronze medal – third place	2022 Saint-Quentin-en-Yvelines	500m time trial C4
Bronze medal – third place	2022 Saint-Quentin-en-Yvelines	Omnium C4
Bronze medal – third place	2026 Apeldoorn	Time trial C4

Anna Grace Taylor (born 7 August 1991) is a New Zealand Para cyclist. She competed in Para cycling – track at the 2020 Summer Paralympics, becoming New Zealand Paralympian #225.

== Hometown ==
Taylor lives in Cambridge in the Waikato region of New Zealand.

== Medal record ==
Taylor made her international debut at the 2019 UCI Para Cycling Track World Championships, and her Paralympic debut at the Tokyo 2020 Paralympic Games in 2021.

In Tokyo 2020, Taylor placed 5th in the Women’s C4 3000m Individual Pursuit. Her time of 3:54.167 was a Paralympic Record but was later beaten by another competitor. Taylor also placed 8th in the Women’s C4-5 500m Time Trial Final.

Taylor earned her first World Championships medals at the 2022 UCI Para Cycling Track World Championships, where she earned bronze in the 500m Time Trial and bronze in the Omnium.

== Impairment and classification ==
Taylor was given a C4 classification after an Acute Cauda Equina Syndrome in 2016 – severe disc prolapse that compressed the spinal cord. She underwent emergency surgery and has subsequent weakness in the left leg, and minor weakness in the right.
