= World record progression in track para-cycling – Women's 500m time trial =

This is an overview of the progression of the World record in track para-cycling for the 500m women's time trial as recognised by the Union Cycliste Internationale (UCI).

== Current classifications ==
Key to tables: Not ratified or later rescined by UCI

=== C5 Progression ===
Time	Cyclists	Class	Location	Track	Date	Competition	Ref
36.379	Zhou Jufang (CHN)	C5	Aguascalientes, Mexico	Indoor track	10 April 2014		
36.004	Zhou Jufang (CHN)	C5	Rio de Janeiro, Brazil	Indoor track	10 September 2016	Paralympic Games	
35.599	Caroline Groot (NED)	C5	Izu, Japan	Indoor track	27 August 2021	Paralympic Games	
35.390	Caroline Groot (NED)	C5	Saint-Quentin-en-Yvelines, France	Indoor track	29 August 2024	Paralympic Games	

=== C4 Progression ===
Time	Cyclists	Class	Location	Track	Date	Competition	Ref
40.015	Susan Powell (AUS)	C4	Adelaide, Australia	Indoor track	5 February 2010		
38.974	Jianping Ruan (CHN)	C4	Carson, United States	Indoor track	9 February 2012		
38.425	Jianping Ruan (CHN)	C4	London, United Kingdom	Indoor track	1 September 2012	Paralympic Games	
37.879	Jianping Ruan (CHN)	C4	Aguascalientes, Mexico	Indoor track	10 April 2014		
37.456	Kadeena Cox (GBR)	C4	Montichiari, Italy	Indoor track	17 March 2016		
35.716	Kadeena Cox (GBR)	C4	Rio de Janeiro, Brazil	Indoor track	10 September 2016	Paralympic Games	
35.223	Kate O'Brien (CAN)	C4	Milton, Canada	Indoor track	31 January 2020		
34.812	Kadeena Cox (GBR)	C4	Izu, Japan	Indoor track	27 August 2021	Paralympic Games	

=== C3 Progression ===
Time	Cyclists	Class	Location	Track	Date	Competition	Ref
42.955	Jamie Whitmore (USA)	C3	Aguascalientes, Mexico	Indoor track	10 April 2014		
41.761	Megan Giglia (GBR)	C3	Montichiari, Italy	Indoor track	18 March 2016		
41.252	Megan Giglia (GBR)	C3	Rio de Janeiro, Brazil	Indoor track	8 September 2016	Paralympic Games	
39.442	Paige Greco (AUS)	C3	Apeldoorn, Netherlands	Indoor track	15 March 2019		
39.004	Keiko Sugiura (JPN)	C3	Saint-Quentin-en-Yvelines, France	Indoor track	20 October 2022	World Championships	
39.093	Aniek van den Aarssen (NED)	C3	Saint-Quentin-en-Yvelines, France	Indoor track	20 October 2022	World Championships	
38.512	Mel Pemble (CAN)	C3	Saint-Quentin-en-Yvelines (FRA)	Indoor track	31 August 2024	Paralympic Games	

=== C2 Progression ===
Time	Cyclists	Class	Location	Track	Date	Competition	Ref
44.862	Alison Jones (USA)	C2	Guadalajara, Mexico	Indoor track	15 November 2011		
43.101	Alyda Norbruis (NED)	C2	Carson, United States	Indoor track	9 February 2012		
42.448	He Yin (CHN)	C2	London, United Kingdom	Indoor track	1 September 2012		
40.002	Alyda Norbruis (NED)	C2	Aguascalientes, Mexico	Indoor track	10 April 2014		
39.959	Alyda Norbruis (NED)	C2	Apeldoorn, Netherlands	Indoor track	26 March 2015		
39.631	Alyda Norbruis (NED)	C2	Rio de Janeiro, Brazil	Indoor track	10 September 2016	Paralympic Games	
39.505	Amanda Reid (AUS)	C2	Apeldoorn, Netherlands	Indoor track	15 March 2019		
39.035	Amanda Reid (AUS)	C2	Milton, Canada	Indoor track	31 January 2020		
38.918	Amanda Reid (AUS)	C2	Brisbane, Australia	Indoor track	17 December 2020		
38.487	Amanda Reid (AUS)	C2	Izu, Japan	Indoor track	27 August 2021	Paralympic Games	
38.162	Amanda Reid (AUS)	C2	Glasgow, United Kingdom	Indoor track	6 August 2023	World Championships	

=== C1 Progression ===
Time	Cyclists	Class	Location	Track	Date	Competition	Ref
45.449	Jayme Richardson (AUS)	C1	London, United Kingdom	Indoor track	1 September 2012	Paralympic Games	
44.439	Li Jieli (CHN)	C1	Montichiari, Italy	Indoor track	18 March 2016		
43.430	Li Jieli (CHN)	C1	Rio de Janeiro, Brazil	Indoor track	23 March 2018		
41.403	Qian Wangwei (CHN)	C1	Izu, Japan	Indoor track	27 August 2021	Paralympic Games	
41.113	Qian Wangwei (CHN)	C1	Glasgow, United Kingdom	Indoor track	4 August 2023	World Championships	
40.883	Qian Wangwei (CHN)	C1	Saint-Quentin-en-Yvelines (FRA)	Indoor track	31 August 2024	Paralympic Games	
40.878	Qian Wangwei (CHN)	C1	Saint-Quentin-en-Yvelines (FRA)	Indoor track	31 August 2024	Paralympic Games	

=== B Progression (1000m) ===
Time	Cyclists	Class	Location	Track	Date	Competition	Ref
1:14.450	Teresa Poole (AUS); Sandra Smith (AUS)	B	Gent, Belgium	Indoor track	2 June 1994		
1:13.473	Teresa Poole (AUS); Sandra Smith (AUS)	B	Atlanta, United States	Open air track	17 August 1996	Paralympic Games	
1:11.927	Sarnya Parker (AUS); Tania Modra (AUS)	B	Sydney, Australia	Indoor track	20 October 2000	Paralympic Games	
1:11.160	Aileen McGlynn (GBR); Ellen Hunter (GBR)	B	Athens, Greece	Indoor track	21 September 2004	Paralympic Games	
1:10.431	Aileen McGlynn (GBR); Ellen Hunter (GBR)	B	Athens, Greece	Indoor track	5 May 2006		
1:09.066	Aileen McGlynn (GBR); Ellen Hunter (GBR)	B	Beijing, China	Indoor track	8 September 2008	Paralympic Games	
1:09.054	Aileen McGlynn (GBR); Ellen Hunter (GBR)	B	Manchester, United Kingdom	Indoor track	7 November 2009		
1:08.714	Felicity Johnson (AUS); Stephanie Morton (AUS)	B	Carson, United States	Indoor track	10 February 2012		
1:05.912	Sophie Thornhill (GBR); Rachel James (GBR)	B	Aguascalientes, Mexico	Indoor track	11 April 2014		
1:05.079	Sophie Thornhill (GBR); Helen Scott (GBR)	B	Rio de Janeiro, Brazil	Indoor track	24 March 2018		
1:04.623	Sophie Thornhill (GBR); Helen Scott (GBR)	B	Brisbane, Australia	Indoor track	7 April 2018		
