= World record progression in track para-cycling – Women's individual pursuit =

This is an overview of the progression of the World record in track para-cycling for the women's individual pursuit as recognised by the Union Cycliste Internationale (UCI).

== Current classifications ==
=== C5 Progression ===
3000 m

Time	Cyclists	Class	Location	Track	Date	Competition	Ref
3:33.248	Sarah Storey (GBR)	C5	Manchester, Great Britain	Indoor track	29 November 2011		
3:32.170	Sarah Storey (GBR)	C5	London, Great Britain	Indoor track	1 September 2012	Paralympic Games	
3:32.050	Sarah Storey (GBR)	C5	Aguascalientes, Mexico	Indoor track	12 April 2014	Paralympic Games	
3:31.394	Sarah Storey (GBR)	C5	Rio, Brazil	Indoor track	8 September 2016	Paralympic Games	
3:27.057	Sarah Storey (GBR)	C5	Izu, Japan	Indoor track	25 August 2021	Paralympic Games	

4000 m

Time	Cyclists	Class	Location	Track	Date	Competition	Ref
5:06.470	Morgan Newberry (GBR)	C5	Glasgow, United Kingdom	Indoor track	30 July 2026	Commonwealth Games	
5:05.764	Morgan Newberry (GBR)	C5	Glasgow, United Kingdom	Indoor track	30 July 2026	Commonwealth Games	

=== C4 Progression ===
3000 m

Time	Cyclists	Class	Location	Track	Date	Competition	Ref
4:09.391	Susan Powell (AUS)	C4	Adelaide, Australia	Indoor track	4 February 2010		
4:05.403	Marie-Claude Molnar (CAN)	C4	Guadalajara, Mexico	Indoor track	16 November 2011		
4:03.306	Susan Powell (AUS)	C4	London, Great Britain	Indoor track	1 September 2012	Paralympic Games	
3:56.135	Susan Powell (AUS)	C4	Aguascalientes, Mexico	Indoor track	12 April 2014		
3:55.006	Shawn Morelli (USA)	C4	Montichiari, Italy	Indoor track	19 March 2016		
3:54.501	Emily Petricola (AUS)	C4	Rio de Janeiro, Brazil	Indoor track	24 March 2018		
3:53.297	Emily Petricola (AUS)	C4	Apeldoorn, Netherlands	Indoor track	16 March 2019		
3:48.210	Emily Petricola (AUS)	C4	Brisbane, Australia	Indoor track	3 November 2019		
3:44.146	Emily Petricola (AUS)	C4	Milton, Canada	Indoor track	1 February 2020		
3:38.061	Emily Petricola (AUS)	C4	Izu, Japan	Indoor track	22 August 2021	Paralympic Games	
3:35.856	Emily Petricola (AUS)	C4	Saint-Quentin-en-Yvelines, France	Indoor track	30 August 2024	Paralympic Games	

4000 m

Time	Cyclists	Class	Location	Track	Date	Competition	Ref
4:49.648	Tara Neyland (NZL)	C4	Glasgow, United Kingdom	Indoor track	30 July 2026	Commonwealth Games	

=== C3 Progression ===
Time	Cyclists	Class	Location	Track	Date	Competition	Ref
4:07.487	Jamie Whitmore (USA)	C3	Aguascalientes, Mexico	Indoor track	12 April 2014		
4:06.756	Megan Giglia (GBR)	C3	Aguascalientes, Mexico	Indoor track	17 March 2016		
4:03.544	Megan Giglia (GBR)	C3	Rio de Janeiro, Brazil	Indoor track	8 September 2016	Paralympic Games	
4:00.206	Paige Greco (AUS)	C3	Apeldoorn, Netherlands	Indoor track	14 March 2019		
3:52.283	Paige Greco (AUS)	C3	Izu, Japan	Indoor track	22 August 2021	Paralympic Games	
3:50.815	Paige Greco (AUS)	C3	Izu, Japan	Indoor track	22 August 2021	Paralympic Games	
3:44.660	Wang Xiaomei (CHN)	C3	Saint-Quentin-en-Yvelines, France	Indoor track	29 August 2024	Paralympic Games	
3:41.692	Wang Xiaomei (CHN)	C3	Saint-Quentin-en-Yvelines, France	Indoor track	29 August 2024	Paralympic Games	

=== C2 Progression ===
Time	Cyclists	Class	Location	Track	Date	Competition	Ref
4:21.699	Alison Jones (USA)	C2	Guadalajara, Mexico	Indoor track	16 November 2011		
4:19.841	Sini Zeng (CHN)	C2	London, Great Britain	Indoor track	30 August 2012	Paralympic Games	
4:07.454	Alyda Norbruis (NED)	C2	Aguascalientes, Mexico	Indoor track	12 April 2014		
4:06.263	Zeng Sini (CHN)	C2	Izu, Japan	Indoor track	22 August 2021	Paralympic Games	
4:02.713	Flurina Rigling (SUI)	C2	Saint-Quentin-en-Yvelines, France	Indoor track	22 October 2022	World Championships	
4:00.228	Flurina Rigling (SUI)	C2	Saint-Quentin-en-Yvelines, France	Indoor track	22 October 2022	World Championships	
3:51.721	Daphne Schrager (GBR)	C2	Glasgow, United Kingdom	Indoor track	3 August 2023	World Championships	
3:45.133	Daphne Schrager (GBR)	C2	Saint-Quentin-en-Yvelines, France	Indoor track	29 August 2024	Paralympic Games	

=== C1 Progression ===
Time	Cyclists	Class	Location	Track	Date	Competition	Ref
4:40.123	Jayme Paris (AUS)	C1	London, Great Britain	Indoor track	30 August 2012	Paralympic Games	
4:31.476	Qian Wangwei (CHN)	C1	Izu, Japan	Indoor track	25 August 2021	Paralympic Games	
4:12.316	Frances Brown (GBR)	C1	Glasgow, United Kingdom	Indoor track	3 August 2023	World Championships	
4:10.941	Frances Brown (GBR)	C1	Glasgow, United Kingdom	Indoor track	6 August 2023	World Championships	
4:10.301	Qian Wangwei (CHN)	C1	Izu, Japan	Indoor track	19 October 2026	Asian Para Games	

=== B Progression ===
3000 m

Time	Cyclists	Class	Location	Track	Date	Competition	Ref
3:59.340	Teresa Poole (AUS); Sandra Smith (AUS)	B	Gent, Belgium	Indoor track	3 June 1994		
3:48.650	Teresa Poole (AUS); Sandra Smith (AUS)	B	Augsburg, Germany	Indoor track	1 August 1995		
3:48.199	Lindy Hou (AUS); Toireasa Ryan (AUS)	B	Prague, Czech Republic	Indoor track	17 September 2003		
3:44.288	Sarnya Parker (AUS); Tania Modra (AUS)	B	Sydney, Australia	Indoor track	21 October 2000	Paralympic Games	
3:44.177	Sarnya Parker (AUS); Toireasa Ryan (AUS)	B	Augsburg, Germany	Indoor track	8 August 2002		
3:41.612	Karissa Whitsell (USA); Katie Compton (USA)	B	Augsburg, Germany	Indoor track	8 August 2002		
3:38.564	Janet Shaw (AUS); Kelly McCombie (AUS)	B	Sydney, Australia	Indoor track	29 April 2004		
3:38.482	Phillipa Gray (NZL); Laura Thompson (NZL)	B	Athens, Greece	Indoor track	22 September 2004	Paralympic Games	
3:36.816	Karissa Whitsell (USA); Katie Compton (USA)	B	Athens, Greece	Indoor track	22 September 2004	Paralympic Games	
3:36.362	Karissa Whitsell (USA); Mackenzie Woodring (USA)	B	Manchester, Great Britain	Indoor track	8 November 2009		
3:31.530	Phillipa Gray (NZL); Laura Thompson (NZL)	B	London, Great Britain	Indoor track	2 September 2012	Paralympic Games	
3:23.328	Emma Foy (NZL); Laura Fairweather (NZL)	B	Aguascalientes, Mexico	Indoor track	10 April 2014		
3:22.088	Emma Foy (NZL); Hannah Van Kampen (NZL)	B	Cambridge, New Zealand	Indoor track	10 November 2019		
3:20.819	Emma Foy (NZL); Hannah Van Kampen (NZL)	B	Milton, Canada	Indoor track	31 January 2020		
3:19.483	Lora Fachie (GBR); Corrine Hall (GBR)	B	Izu, Japan	Indoor track	28 August 2021	Paralympic Games	
3:17.643	Sophie Unwin (GBR); Jenny Holl (GBR)	B	Saint-Quentin-en-Yvelines, France	Indoor track	1 September 2024	Paralympic Games	

4000 m

Time	Cyclists	Class	Location	Track	Date	Competition	Ref
4:36.737	Sophie Unwin (GBR); Jenny Holl (GBR)	B	Manchester, Great Britain	Indoor track	21 February 2025	British Championships	
4:32.697	Sophie Unwin (GBR); Jenny Holl (GBR)	B	Rio de Janeiro, Brazil	Indoor track	17 October 2025	World Championships	
4:30.262	Sophie Unwin (GBR); Jenny Holl (GBR)	B	Apeldoorn, Netherlands	Indoor track	30 October 2026	World Championships	
4:29.672	Emma Foy (NZL); Jessie Hodges (NZL)	B	Apeldoorn, Netherlands	Indoor track	30 October 2026	World Championships	
