= Paralympic record progression track cycling – Women's 500 m time trial =

This is an overview of the progression of the Paralympic track cycling record of the women's 500 m time trial as recognised by the Union Cycliste Internationale (UCI) and IPC.

== C5 Progression ==
| Time | Cyclists | Class | Location | Track | Date | Competition | Ref |
|---|---|---|---|---|---|---|---|
| 36.937 | Ju Fang Zhou (CHN) | C5 | Beijing (CHN) | Indoor track | 8 September 2008 | 2008 Paralympic Games | |
| 36.004 | Ju Fang Zhou (CHN) | C5 | Rio (GBR) | Indoor track | 10 September 2016 | 2016 Paralympic Games | |
| 35.599 | Caroline Groot (NED) | C5 | Izu (JPN) | Indoor track | 27 August 2021 | 2020 Paralympic Games | |
| 35.390 | Caroline Groot (NED) | C5 | Saint-Quentin-en-Yvelines (FRA) | Indoor track | 29 August 2024 | 2024 Paralympic Games | |

== C4 Progression ==
| Time | Cyclists | Class | Location | Track | Date | Competition | Ref |
|---|---|---|---|---|---|---|---|
| 40.278 | Jennifer Schuble (USA) | CP4 | Beijing (CHN) | Indoor track | 8 September 2008 | 2008 Paralympic Games | |
| 38.425 | Jianping Ruan (CHN) | C4 | London (GBR) | Indoor track | 1 September 2012 | 2012 Paralympic Games | |
| 35.716 | Kadeena Cox (GBR) | C4 | Rio (BRA) | Indoor track | 10 September 2016 | 2016 Paralympic Games | |
| 34.812 | Kadeena Cox (GBR) | C4 | Izu (JPN) | Indoor track | 27 August 2021 | 2020 Paralympic Games | |

== C3 Progression ==
| Time | Cyclists | Class | Location | Track | Date | Competition | Ref |
|---|---|---|---|---|---|---|---|
| 46.427 | Jayme Paris (AUS) | CP3 | Beijing (CHN) | Indoor track | 8 September 2008 | 2008 Paralympic Games | |
| 43.281 | Paula Tesoriero (NZL) | LC3 | Beijing (CHN) | Indoor track | 8 September 2008 | 2008 Paralympic Games | |
| 43.281 | (International Paralympic Committee) Minimum standard | C3 | | | | | |
| 41.252 | Megan Giglia (GBR) | C3 | Rio (BRA) | Indoor track | 10 September 2016 | 2016 Paralympic Games | |
| 39.869 | Keiko Sugiura (JPN) | C3 | Izu (JPN) | Indoor track | 27 August 2021 | 2020 Paralympic Games | |
| 38.512 | Mel Pemble (CAN) | C3 | Saint-Quentin-en-Yvelines (FRA) | Indoor track | 31 August 2024 | 2024 Paralympic Games | |

== C2 Progression ==
| Time | Cyclists | Class | Location | Track | Date | Competition | Ref |
|---|---|---|---|---|---|---|---|
| 41.133 | Ye Yaping (CHN) | LC2 | Beijing (CHN) | Indoor track | 8 September 2008 | 2008 Paralympic Games | |
| 42.448 | Yin He (CHN) | C2 | London (GBR) | Indoor track | 1 September 2012 | 2012 Paralympic Games | |
| 40.354 | Amanda Reid (AUS) | C2 | Rio (BRA) | Indoor track | 10 September 2016 | 2016 Paralympic Games | |
| 39.631 | Alyda Norbruis (NED) | C2 | Rio (BRA) | Indoor track | 10 September 2016 | 2016 Paralympic Games | |
| 38.487 | Amanda Reid (AUS) | C2 | Izu (JPN) | Indoor track | 27 August 2021 | 2020 Paralympic Games | |

== C1 Progression ==
| Time | Cyclists | Class | Location | Track | Date | Competition | Ref |
|---|---|---|---|---|---|---|---|
| 36.937 | Ju Fang Zhou (CHN) | LC1 | Beijing (CHN) | Indoor track | 8 September 2008 | 2008 Paralympic Games | |
| 45.449 | Jayme Paris (AUS) | C1 | London (GBR) | Indoor track | 1 September 2012 | 2012 Paralympic Games | |
| 41.403 | Qian Wangwei (CHN) | C1 | Izu (JPN) | Indoor track | 27 August 2021 | 2020 Paralympic Games | |
| 40.883 | Qian Wangwei (CHN) | C1 | Saint-Quentin-en-Yvelines (FRA) | Indoor track | 31 August 2024 | 2024 Paralympic Games | |
| 40.878 | Qian Wangwei (CHN) | C1 | Saint-Quentin-en-Yvelines (FRA) | Indoor track | 31 August 2024 | 2024 Paralympic Games | |
