= World record progression in track para-cycling – Men's individual pursuit =

This is an overview of the progression of the World record in track para-cycling for the Individual pursuit as recognised by the Union Cycliste Internationale (UCI).

== Current classifications ==
=== C5 Progression (4000m) ===
Time	Cyclists	Class	Location	Track	Date	Competition	Ref
4:37.230	Michael Gallagher (AUS)	C5	Montichiari, Italy	Indoor track	12 March 2011		
4:30.012	Michael Gallagher (AUS)	C5	Aguascalientes, Mexico	Indoor track	10 April 2014		
4:24.057	Michael Gallagher (AUS)	C5	Aguascalientes, Mexico	Indoor track	11 April 2014		
4:18.274	Dorian Foulon (FRA)	C5	Izu, Japan	Indoor track	27 August 2021	Paralympic Games	
4:17.700	Dorian Foulon (FRA)	C5	Saint-Quentin-en-Yvelines, France	Indoor track	31 August 2024	Paralympic Games	

=== C4 Progression (4000m) ===
Time	Cyclists	Class	Location	Track	Date	Competition	Ref
4:40.315	Carol-Eduard Novak (ROU)	C4	London, Great Britain	Indoor track	1 September 2012	Paralympic Games	
4:30.806	Jozef Metelka (SVK)	C4	Aguascalientes, Mexico	Indoor track	11 April 2014		
4:26.924	Jozef Metelka (SVK)	C4	Montichiari, Italy	Indoor track	9 March 2016		
4:22.772	Jozef Metelka (SVK)	C4	Izu, Japan	Indoor track	26 August 2021	Paralympic Games	
4:17.700	Archie Atkinson (GBR)	C4	Saint-Quentin-en-Yvelines, France	Indoor track	31 August 2024	Paralympic Games	

=== C3 Progression (3000m) ===
Time	Cyclists	Class	Location	Track	Date	Competition	Ref
3:35.257	Darren Kenny (GBR)	C3	London, Great Britain	Indoor track	31 August 2012	Paralympic Games	
3:26.691	Alexey Obydennov (RUS)	C3	Aguascalientes, Mexico	Indoor track	11 April 2014		
3:19.780	Finlay Graham (GBR)	C3	Izu, Japan	Indoor track	26 August 2021	Paralympic Games	
3:17.593	Jaco van Gass (GBR)	C3	Izu, Japan	Indoor track	26 August 2021	Paralympic Games	
3:15.488	Jaco van Gass (GBR)	C3	Saint-Quentin-en-Yvelines, France	Indoor track	30 August 2024	Paralympic Games	

=== C2 Progression (3000m) ===
Time	Cyclists	Class	Location	Track	Date	Competition	Ref
3:48.149	Liang Guihua (CHN)	C2	Montichiari, Italy	Indoor track	11 March 2011		
3:45.828	Liang Guihua (CHN)	C2	London, Great Britain	Indoor track	31 August 2012	Paralympic Games	
3:45.243	Liang Guihua (CHN)	C2	London, Great Britain	Indoor track	31 August 2012	Paralympic Games	
3:40.367	Liang Guihua (CHN)	C2	Aguascalientes, Mexico	Indoor track	11 April 2014		
3:36.322	Ewoud Vromant (BEL)	C2	Milton, Canada	Indoor track	31 January 2020		
3:31.817	Alexandre Léauté (FRA)	C2	Izu, Japan	Indoor track	26 August 2021	Paralympic Games	
3:31.478	Alexandre Léauté (FRA)	C2	Izu, Japan	Indoor track	26 August 2021	Paralympic Games	
3:31.082	Alexandre Léauté (FRA)	C2	Saint-Quentin-en-Yvelines, France	Indoor track	22 October 2022	World Championships	
3:25.888	Alexandre Léauté (FRA)	C2	Glasgow, Great Britain	Indoor track	2 August 2023	World Championships	
3:24.298	Alexandre Léauté (FRA)	C2	Saint-Quentin-en-Yvelines, France	Indoor track	30 August 2024	Paralympic Games	

=== C1 Progression (3000m) ===
Time	Cyclists	Class	Location	Track	Date	Competition	Ref
3:53.881	Mark Colbourne (GBR)	C1	London, Great Britain	Indoor track	31 August 2012	Paralympic Games	
3:51.961	Li Zhangyu (CHN)	C1	Montichiari, Italy	Indoor track	17 March 2016		
3:50.373	Li Zhangyu (CHN)	C1	Rio de Janeiro, Brazil	Indoor track	9 September 2016	Paralympic Games	
3:50.051	Ricardo Ten Argiles (ESP)	C1	Apeldoorn, Netherlands	Indoor track	14 March 2019		
3:49.450	Ross Wilson (CAN)	C1	Glasgow, Great Britain	Indoor track	8 November 2019		
3:45.469	Li Zhangyu (CHN)	C1	Milton, Canada	Indoor track	30 January 2020		
3:35.954	Mikhail Astashov (RUS)	C2	Izu, Japan	Indoor track	26 August 2021	Paralympic Games	
3:31.338	Li Zhangyu (CHN)	C1	Saint-Quentin-en-Yvelines, France	Indoor track	29 August 2024	Paralympic Games	

=== B Progression (4000m) ===
Time	Cyclists	Class	Location	Track	Date	Competition	Ref
4:38.340	Paul Clohessy (AUS); Edmund Hollands (AUS)	B	Perth, Australia	Indoor track	26 May 1995		
4:35.840	Paul Clohessy (AUS); Edmund Hollands (AUS)	B	Augsburg, Germany	Indoor track	2 August 1995		
4:34.150	Herve Deschamps (FRA); Guy Rouchouze (FRA)	B	Augsburg, Germany	Indoor track	16 August 1998		
4:32.835	Matthew King (USA); Spencer Yates (AUS)	B	Atlanta, United States	Indoor track	17 August 1996	Paralympic Games	
4:30.546	Paul Clohessy (AUS); Edmund Hollands (AUS)	B	Colorado Springs, United States	Indoor track	17 September 1998		
4:26.498	Jan Mulder (NED); Jeron Straathof (NED)	B	Sydney, Australia	Indoor track	22 October 2000	Paralympic Games	
4:21.451	Kieran Modra (AUS); Robert Crowe (AUS)	B	Aigle, Switzerland	Indoor track	11 September 2006		
4:20.891	Kieran Modra (AUS); Tyson Lawrwence (AUS)	B	Aigle, Switzerland	Indoor track	11 September 2006		
4:17.780	Kieran Modra (AUS); Scott Mcphee (AUS)	B	London, Great Britain	Indoor track	30 August 2012	Paralympic Games	
4:17.756	Kieran Modra (AUS); Scott Mcphee (AUS)	B	London, Great Britain	Indoor track	1 September 2012	Paralympic Games	
4:11.213	Matt Formston (AUS); Michael Curran (AUS)	B	Aguascalientes, Mexico	Indoor track	10 April 2014		
4:08.146	Steve Bate (GBR); Adam Duggelby (GBR)	B	Rio de Janeiro, Brazil	Indoor track	8 September 2016	Paralympic Games	
4:03.528	Marcin Polak (POL); Michał Ładosz (POL)	B	Milton, Canada	Indoor track	31 January 2020		
3:59.470	Tristan Bangma (NED); Patrick Bos (NED)	B	Izu, Japan	Indoor track	25 August 2021	Paralympic Games	
3:58.766	Tristan Bangma (NED); Patrick Bos (NED)	B	Glasgow, Great Britain	Indoor track	2 August 2023	World Championships	
3:58.397	Tristan Bangma (NED); Patrick Bos (NED)	B	Rio de Janeiro, Brazil	Indoor track	23 March 2024	World Championships	
3:55.396	Tristan Bangma (NED); Patrick Bos (NED)	B	Saint-Quentin-en-Yvelines, France	Indoor track	29 August 2024	Paralympic Games	
