= Paralympic record progression track cycling – Men's individual pursuit =

This is an overview of the progression of the Paralympic track cycling record of the men's individual pursuit as recognised by the Union Cycliste Internationale (UCI) and IPC.

== C5 Progression (4000m) ==
Time	Cyclists	Class	Location	Track	Date	Competition	Ref
4:30.012	Michael Gallagher (AUS)	C5	London (GBR)	Indoor track	1 September 2012	2012 Paralympic Games	
4:18.274	Dorian Foulon (FRA)	C5	Izu (JPN)	Indoor track	27 August 2021	2020 Paralympic Games	
4:17.700	Dorian Foulon (FRA)	C5	Saint-Quentin-en-Yvelines (FRA)	Indoor track	31 August 2024	2024 Paralympic Games	

== C4 Progression (4000m) ==
Time	Cyclists	Class	Location	Track	Date	Competition	Ref
4:40.315	Carol-Eduard Novak (ROU)	C4	London (GBR)	Indoor track	1 September 2012	2012 Paralympic Games	
4:29.112	Jozef Metelka (SVK)	C4	Rio (BRA)	Indoor track	10 September 2016	2016 Paralympic Games	
4:22.772	Jozef Metelka (SVK)	C4	Izu (JPN)	Indoor track	26 August 2021	2020 Paralympic Games	
4:17.700	Archie Atkinson (GBR)	C4	Saint-Quentin-en-Yvelines (FRA)	Indoor track	31 August 2024	2024 Paralympic Games	

== C3 Progression (3000m) ==
Time	Cyclists	Class	Location	Track	Date	Competition	Ref
3:35.257	Darren Kenny (GBR)	C3	London (GBR)	Indoor track	31 August 2012	2012 Paralympic Games	
3:32.336	David Nicholas (AUS)	C3	Rio (BRA)	Indoor track	9 September 2016	2016 Paralympic Games	
3:17.593	Jaco van Gass (GBR)	C3	Izu (JPN)	Indoor track	26 August 2021	2020 Paralympic Games	
3:15.488	Jaco van Gass (GBR)	C3	Saint-Quentin-en-Yvelines (FRA)	Indoor track	30 August 2024	2024 Paralympic Games	

== C2 Progression (3000m) ==
Time	Cyclists	Class	Location	Track	Date	Competition	Ref
3:45.828	Guihua Liang (CHN)	C2	London (GBR)	Indoor track	31 August 2012	2012 Paralympic Games	
3:45.243	Guihua Liang (CHN)	C2	London (GBR)	Indoor track	31 August 2012	2012 Paralympic Games	
3:42.916	Guihua Liang (CHN)	C2	Rio (BRA)	Indoor track	9 September 2016	2016 Paralympic Games	
3:31.817	Alexandre Léauté (FRA)	C2	Izu (JPN)	Indoor track	26 August 2021	2020 Paralympic Games	
3:31.478	Alexandre Léauté (FRA)	C2	Izu (JPN)	Indoor track	26 August 2021	2020 Paralympic Games	
3:24.298	Alexandre Léauté (FRA)	C2	Saint-Quentin-en-Yvelines (FRA)	Indoor track	30 August 2024	2024 Paralympic Games	

== C1 Progression (3000m) ==
Time	Cyclists	Class	Location	Track	Date	Competition	Ref
3:53.881	Mark Colbourne (GBR)	C1	London (GBR)	Indoor track	31 August 2012	2012 Paralympic Games	
3:50.373	Li Zhangyu (CHN)	C1	Rio (BRA)	Indoor track	9 September 2016	2016 Paralympic Games	
3:35.954	Mikhail Astashov	C1	Izu (JPN)	Indoor track	26 August 2021	2020 Paralympic Games	
3:31.338	Li Zhangyu (CHN)	C1	Saint-Quentin-en-Yvelines (FRA)	Indoor track	29 August 2024	2024 Paralympic Games	

== B Progression (4000m) ==
Time	Cyclists	Class	Location	Track	Date	Competition	Ref
4:26.498	Jan Mulder (NED); Jeron Straathof (NED)	B	Sydney (AUS)	Indoor track	19 October 2000	2000 Paralympic Games	
4:21.451	Kieran Modra (AUS); Roberts Crowe (AUS)	B	Athens (GRE)	Indoor track	19 September 2004	2004 Paralympic Games	
4:17.756	Neil Fachie (GBR); Barney Storey (GBR)	B	London (GBR)	Indoor track	30 August 2012	2012 Paralympic Games	
4:08.146	Steve Bate (GBR); Adam Duggleby (GBR)	B	Rio de Janeiro (BRA)	Indoor track	8 September 2016	2016 Paralympic Games	
3:59.470	Tristan Bangma (NED); Patrick Bos (NED)	B	Tokyo (JPN)	Indoor track	22 August 2021	2020 Paralympic Games	
3:55.396	Tristan Bangma (NED); Patrick Bos (NED)	B	Saint-Quentin-en-Yvelines (FRA)	Indoor track	29 August 2024	2024 Paralympic Games	
