= List of Paralympic Games records in track cycling =

This is the list of Paralympic records in track cycling.

== Men's records ==
denotes a performance that is also a current world record. Statistics are correct as of 1 September 2024.

Event	Record	Athlete	Class	Nationality	Date	Meet	Place	Ref
Flying 200 m time trial (progression)	10.050	Anthony Kappes; Craig MacLean (pilot)	B	Great Britain	2 September 2012	2012 Paralympic Games	London, Great Britain	
1 km time trial (progression)	1:01.557	Alfonso Cabello	C5	Spain	26 August 2021	2020 Paralympic Games	Izu, Japan	
1 km time trial (progression)	1:02.021	Korey Boddington	C4	Australia	31 August 2024	2024 Paralympic Games	Saint-Quentin-en-Yvelines, France	
1 km time trial (progression)	1:04.825	Jaco van Gass	C3	Great Britain	31 August 2024	2024 Paralympic Games	Saint-Quentin-en-Yvelines, France	
1 km time trial (progression)	1:07.944	Alexandre Léauté	C2	France	31 August 2024	2024 Paralympic Games	Saint-Quentin-en-Yvelines, France	
1 km time trial (progression)	1:08.347	Li Zhangyu	C1	China	27 August 2021	2020 Paralympic Games	Izu, Japan	
1 km time trial (progression)	58.038	Neil Fachie; Matt Rotherham (pilot)	B	Great Britain	28 August 2021	2020 Paralympic Games	Izu, Japan	
3000 m pursuit (progression)	3:15.488	Jaco van Gass	C3	Great Britain	30 August 2024	2024 Paralympic Games	Saint-Quentin-en-Yvelines, France	
3000 m pursuit (progression)	3:24.298	Alexandre Léauté	C2	France	30 August 2024	2024 Paralympic Games	Saint-Quentin-en-Yvelines, France	
3000 m pursuit (progression)	3:31.338	Li Zhangyu	C1	China	29 August 2024	2024 Paralympic Games	Saint-Quentin-en-Yvelines, France	
4000 m pursuit (progression)	4:13.934	Dorian Foulon	C5	France	31 August 2024	2024 Paralympic Games	Saint-Quentin-en-Yvelines, France	
4000 m pursuit (progression)	4:17.700	Archie Atkinson	C4	Great Britain	31 August 2024	2024 Paralympic Games	Saint-Quentin-en-Yvelines, France	
4000 m pursuit (progression)	3:55.396	Tristan Bangma; Patrick Bos (pilot)	B	Netherlands	29 August 2024	2024 Paralympic Games	Saint-Quentin-en-Yvelines, France	

== Women's records ==
denotes a performance that is also a current world record. Statistics are correct as of 1 September 2024.

Event	Record	Athlete	Class	Nationality	Date	Meet	Place	Ref
Flying 200 m time trial (progression)	11.675	Lindy Hou; Janelle Lindsay (pilot)	B	Australia	19 September 2004	2004 Paralympic Games	Athens, Greece	
500 m time trial (progression)	35.390	Caroline Groot	C5	Netherlands	29 August 2024	2024 Paralympic Games	Saint-Quentin-en-Yvelines, France	
500 m time trial (progression)	34.812	Kadeena Cox	C4	Great Britain	27 August 2021	2020 Paralympic Games	Izu, Japan	
500 m time trial (progression)	38.512	Mel Pemble	C3	Canada	31 August 2024	2024 Paralympic Games	Saint-Quentin-en-Yvelines, France	
500 m time trial (progression)	38.487	Amanda Reid	C2	Australia	27 August 2021	2020 Paralympic Games	Izu, Japan	
500 m time trial (progression)	40.878	Qian Wangwei	C1	China	31 August 2024	2024 Paralympic Games	Saint-Quentin-en-Yvelines, France	
1 km time trial (progression)	1:05.291	Larissa Klaassen; Imke Brommer (pilot)	B	Netherlands	26 August 2021	2020 Paralympic Games	Izu, Japan	
3000 m individual pursuit (progression)	3:27.057	Sarah Storey	C5	Great Britain	25 August 2021	2020 Paralympic Games	Izu, Japan	
3000 m individual pursuit (progression)	3:35.856	Emily Petricola	C4	Australia	30 August 2024	2024 Paralympic Games	Saint-Quentin-en-Yvelines, France	
3000 m individual pursuit (progression)	3:41.692	Wang Xiaomei	C3	China	29 August 2024	2024 Paralympic Games	Saint-Quentin-en-Yvelines, France	
3000 m individual pursuit (progression)	3:45.133	Daphne Schrager	C2	Great Britain	29 August 2024	2024 Paralympic Games	Saint-Quentin-en-Yvelines, France	
3000 m individual pursuit (progression)	4:17.814	Qian Wangwei	C1	China	29 August 2024	2024 Paralympic Games	Saint-Quentin-en-Yvelines, France	
3000 m individual pursuit (progression)	3:17.643	Sophie Unwin; Jenny Holl (pilot)	B	Great Britain	1 September 2024	2024 Paralympic Games	Saint-Quentin-en-Yvelines, France	

== Mixed records ==
denotes a performance that is also a current world record. Statistics are correct as of 28 August 2021.

Event	Record	Athlete	Class	Nationality	Date	Meet	Place	Ref
750 m Team Sprint (progression)	47.579	Kadeena Cox; Jaco van Gass; Jody Cundy	C1–5	Great Britain	28 August 2021	2020 Paralympic Games	Izu, Japan	
