= Paralympic record progression track cycling – Women's individual pursuit =

This is an overview of the progression of the Paralympic track cycling record of the women's individual pursuit as recognised by the Union Cycliste Internationale (UCI) and IPC.

== Record progressions ==
WR - denotes a time which was also the world record

=== C5 Progression ===
Time	Cyclists	Class	Location	Track	Date	Competition	Ref
3:32.170	Sarah Storey (GBR)	C5	London (GBR)	Indoor track	1 September 2012	2012 Paralympic Games	
3:31.39 WR	Sarah Storey (GBR)	C5	Rio (BRA)	Indoor track	8 September 2016	2016 Paralympic Games	
3:27.057 WR	Sarah Storey (GBR)	C5	Izu (JPN)	Indoor track	25 August 2021	2020 Paralympic Games	

=== C4 Progression ===
Time	Cyclists	Class	Location	Track	Date	Competition	Ref
4:03.306	Susan Powell (AUS)	C4	London (GBR)	Indoor track	1 September 2012	2012 Paralympic Games	
3:57.741	Shawn Morelli (USA)	C4	Rio (BRA)	Indoor track	8 September 2016	2016 Paralympic Games	
3:38.061	Emily Petricola (AUS)	C4	Izu (JPN)	Indoor track	22 August 2021	2020 Paralympic Games	
3:35.856 WR	Emily Petricola (AUS)	C4	Saint-Quentin-en-Yvelines (FRA)	Indoor track	30 August 2024	2024 Paralympic Games	

=== C3 Progression ===
Time	Cyclists	Class	Location	Track	Date	Competition	Ref
4:22.862	(International Paralympic Committee) Minimum standard	C3					
4:03.544 WR	Megan Giglia (GBR)	C3	Rio (BRA)	Indoor track	8 September 2016	2016 Paralympic Games	
3:52.283 WR	Paige Greco (AUS)	C3	Izu (JPN)	Indoor track	22 August 2021	2020 Paralympic Games	
3:50.815 WR	Paige Greco (AUS)	C3	Izu (JPN)	Indoor track	22 August 2021	2020 Paralympic Games	
3:44.660 WR	Wang Xiaomei (CHN)	C3	Saint-Quentin-en-Yvelines (FRA)	Indoor track	29 August 2024	2024 Paralympic Games	
3:41.692 WR	Wang Xiaomei (CHN)	C3	Saint-Quentin-en-Yvelines (FRA)	Indoor track	29 August 2024	2024 Paralympic Games	

=== C2 Progression ===
Time	Cyclists	Class	Location	Track	Date	Competition	Ref
4:19.841	Sini Zeng (CHN)	C2	London (GBR)	Indoor track	30 August 2012	2012 Paralympic Games	
4:10.654	Alyda Norbruis (NED)	C2	Rio (BRA)	Indoor track	8 September 2016	2016 Paralympic Games	
4:06.263	Zeng Sini (CHN)	C2	Izu (JPN)	Indoor track	22 August 2021	2020 Paralympic Games	
3:45.133 WR	Daphne Schrager (GBR)	C2	Saint-Quentin-en-Yvelines (FRA)	Indoor track	29 August 2024	2024 Paralympic Games	

=== C1 Progression ===
Time	Cyclists	Class	Location	Track	Date	Competition	Ref
4:40.123	Jayme Paris (AUS)	C1	London (GBR)	Indoor track	30 August 2012	2012 Paralympic Games	
4:31.476	Qian Wangwei (CHN)	C1	Izu (JPN)	Indoor track	25 August 2021	2020 Paralympic Games	
4:17.814	Qian Wangwei (CHN)	C1	Saint-Quentin-en-Yvelines (FRA)	Indoor track	29 August 2024	2024 Paralympic Games	

=== B Progression ===
Time	Cyclists	Class	Location	Track	Date	Competition	Ref
3:54.307	Teresa Poole (AUS); Sandra Smith (AUS)	B	Atlanta (USA)	Indoor track	17 August 1996	1996 Paralympic Games	
3:44.288	Sarnya Parker (AUS); Tania Modra (AUS)	B	Sydney (AUS)	Indoor track	21 October 2000	2000 Paralympic Games	
3:38.795	Karissa Whitsell (USA); Katie Compton (USA)	B	Athens (GRE)	Indoor track	22 September 2004	2004 Paralympic Games	
3:38.482	Phillipa Gray (NZL); Laura Thompson (NZL)	B	Athens, (GRE)	Indoor track	22 September 2004	2004 Paralympic Games	
3:36.816	Karissa Whitsell (USA); Katie Compton (USA)	B	Athens, (GRE)	Indoor track	22 September 2004	2004 Paralympic Games	
3:31.530	Phillipa Gray (NZL); Laura Thompson (NZL)	B	London, (GBR)	Indoor track	2 September 2012	2012 Paralympic Games	
3:19.483	Lora Fachie (GBR); Corrine Hall (GBR)	B	Izu, (JPN)	Indoor track	28 August 2021	2020 Paralympic Games	
3:17.643	Sophie Unwin (GBR); Jenny Holl (GBR)	B	Saint-Quentin-en-Yvelines (FRA)	Indoor track	1 September 2024	2024 Paralympic Games	
