= World record progression in track para-cycling – Women's flying 200m time trial =

This is an overview of the progression of the World record in track para-cycling for the Flying 200m women's time trial as recognised by the Union Cycliste Internationale (UCI).

== Current classifications ==
=== C5 Progression ===
Time	Cyclists	Class	Location	Track	Date	Competition	Ref
12.753	Crystal Lane (USA)	C5	Manchester, Great Britain	Indoor track	26 September 2013		
12.070	Caroline Groot (NED)	C5	Apeldoorn, Netherlands	Indoor track	15 March 2019		
11.605	Marie Patouillet (FRA)	C5	Saint-Quentin-en-Yvelines, France	Indoor track	20 October 2022	World Championships	

=== C4 Progression ===
Time	Cyclists	Class	Location	Track	Date	Competition	Ref
15.736	Zoe Marusiak (GBR)	C4	Manchester, Great Britain	Indoor track	23 August 2003		
13.551	Kate Horan (NZL)	C4	Cambridge, New Zealand	Indoor track	30 January 2015		
13.198	Kate Horan (NZL)	C4	Cambridge, New Zealand	Indoor track	11 February 2016		
12.957	Nikita Howarth (NZL)	C4	Invercargill, New Zealand	Indoor track	1 December 2018		
11.519	Kate O'Brien (CAN)	C4	Milton, Canada	Indoor track	31 January 2020	World Championships	
11.409	Kadeena Cox (GBR)	C4	Apeldoorn, Netherlands	Indoor track	31 October 2026	World Championships	

=== C3 Progression ===
Time	Cyclists	Class	Location	Track	Date	Competition	Ref
14.389	Carla Brown (USA)	C3	Colorado Springs, United States	Indoor track	8 December 2018		
13.250	Paige Greco (AUS)	C3	Apeldoorn, Netherlands	Indoor track	15 March 2019		
12.853	Wang Xiaomei (CHN)	C3	Milton, Canada	Indoor track	31 January 2020	World Championships	
12.666	Mel Pemble (CAN)	C3	Saint-Quentin-en-Yvelines, France	Indoor track	20 October 2022	World Championships	
12.506	Wang Xiaomei (CHN)	C3	Rio de Janeiro, Brazil	Indoor track	23 March 2024	World Championships	

=== C2 Progression ===
Time	Cyclists	Class	Location	Track	Date	Competition	Ref
14.720	Paula Tesoriero (NZL)	C2	Manchester, Great Britain	Indoor track	22 May 2009		
13.672	Song Zhenling (CHN)	C2	Milton, Canada	Indoor track	31 January 2020	World Championships	
13.234	Amanda Reid (AUS)	C2	Brisbane, Australia	Indoor track	3 April 2022	Oceania Championships	
13.123	Flurina Rigling (SUI)	C2	Glasgow, Great Britain	Indoor track	4 August 2023	World Championships	
13.037	Flurina Rigling (SUI)	C2	Apeldoorn, Netherlands	Indoor track	31 October 2026	World Championships	

=== C1 Progression ===
Time	Cyclists	Class	Location	Track	Date	Competition	Ref
18.467	Qian Wangwei (CHN)	C1	Milton, Canada	Indoor track	1 September 2012	World Championships	
15.606	Katie Toft (GBR)	C1	Saint-Quentin-en-Yvelines, France	Indoor track	20 October 2022	World Championships	
13.367	Qian Wangwei (CHN)	C1	Glasgow, Great Britain	Indoor track	6 August 2023	World Championships	

=== B Progression (1000m) ===
Time	Cyclists	Class	Location	Track	Date	Competition	Ref
13.100	Teresa Poole (AUS); Sandra Smith (AUS)	B	Gent, Belgium	Indoor track	2 June 1994		
12.779	Christine Fisher (AUS); Geneviève Warriner (AUS)	B	Sydney, Australia	Indoor track	19 April 2002		
12.438	Sarnya Parker (AUS); Toireasa Ryan (AUS)	B	Augsburg, Germany	Indoor track	5 August 2002		
12.375	Sarnya Parker (AUS); Toireasa Ryan (AUS)	B	Augsburg, Germany	Indoor track	7 August 2002		
12.285	Julia Werner-Hafter (USA); Nathalie Kelly (USA)	B	Colorado Springs, United States	Indoor track	15 September 1998		
12.126	Janet Shaw (AUS); Leeanne Manderson (AUS)	B	Sydney, Germany	Indoor track	3 May 2003		
12.029	Janet Shaw (AUS); Leeanne Manderson (AUS)	B	Sydney, Australia	Indoor track	30 April 2004		
11.456	Felicity Johnson (AUS); Stephanie Morton (AUS)	B	Melbourne, Australia	Indoor track	16 December 2011		
11.112	Brandie O'Connor (AUS); Breanna Hargrave (AUS)	B	Aguascalientes, Mexico	Indoor track	13 April 2014		
11.045	Jessica Gallagher (AUS); Madison Janssen (AUS)	B	Montichiari, Italy	Indoor track	20 March 2016		
10.891	Sophie Thornhill (GBR); Helen Scott (GBR)	B	Rio de Janeiro, Brazil	Indoor track	25 March 2018		
10.762	Sophie Thornhill (GBR); Helen Scott (GBR)	B	Apeldoorn, Netherlands	Indoor track	17 March 2019		
10.609	Sophie Thornhill (GBR); Helen Scott (GBR)	B	Brisbane, Australia	Indoor track	5 April 2019		
