= Cycling at the 2016 Summer Paralympics – Women's road race C1–3 =

Cycling, Women's road race C1-3 at the XV Paralympic Games
- Venue: Pontal, Rio
- Dates: September 17

The women's road race C1-3 cycling event at the 2016 Summer Paralympics took place on September 17 at Pontal, Rio. The race distance was 60 km.

== Results : Women's road race C1-3 ==
Rank	Name	Nationality	Classification	Time	
1st place, gold medalist(s)	Jamie Whitmore	United States	C3	01:30:14	0
2nd place, silver medalist(s)	Zeng Sini	China	C2	s.t.	s.t.
3rd place, bronze medalist(s)	Denise Schindler	Germany	C3	s.t.	s.t.
4	Allison Jones	United States	C2	01:30:35	+21
5	Alyda Norbruis	Netherlands	C2	s.t.	s.t.
6	Zhenling Song	China	C2	01:30:40	+26
7	Megan Giglia	Great Britain	C3	s.t.	s.t.
8	Simone Kennedy	Australia	C3	01:30:49	+35
9	Tereza Diepoldova	Czech Republic	C2	01:30:53	39
10	Daniela Munevar	Colombia	C2	01:32:12	+01:58
11	Amanda Reid	Australia	C2	01:39:12	+08:58
