= Cycling at the 2016 Summer Paralympics – Women's road time trial C1–3 =

Cycling, women's road time trial C1–3 at the XV Paralympic Games
- Venue: Flamengo Park
- Dates: 14 September
- Competitors: 12 from 9 nations

Medalists
1st place, gold medalist(s)		Alyda Norbruis	Netherlands
2nd place, silver medalist(s)		Denise Schindler	Germany
3rd place, bronze medalist(s)		Zeng Sini	China

The Women's time trial C1–3 road cycling event at the 2016 Summer Paralympics took place on 14 September at Flamengo Park, Pontal. Twelve riders from nine nations competed.

The C1 category is for cyclists with upper or lower limb disabilities and most severe neurological dysfunction. The C2 category is for cyclists with upper or lower limb impairments and moderate to severe neurological dysfunction. The C3 category is for cyclists with moderate upper or lower limb dysfunctions and includes those with cerebral palsy, limb impairments and amputations.

== Results ==
Rank	Name	Nationality	Class	Factored time
1st place, gold medalist(s)	Alyda Norbruis	Netherlands	C2	29:46.51
2nd place, silver medalist(s)	Denise Schindler	Germany	C3	30:18.99
3rd place, bronze medalist(s)	Zeng Sini	China	C2	30:41.42
4	Daniela Munévar	Colombia	C2	30:46.88
5	Allison Jones	United States	C2	31:44.34
6	Megan Giglia	Great Britain	C3	31:44.56
7	Jamie Whitmore	United States	C3	31:45.47
8	Tereza Diepoldová	Czech Republic	C2	32:16.37
9	Song Zhenling	China	C2	32:36.92
10	Simone Kennedy	Australia	C3	34:31.32
11	Amanda Reid	Australia	C2	35:55.81
–	Roxanne Burns	South Africa	C3	DNS
