= Mikhail Astashov =

Russian Paralympic cyclist (born 1988)

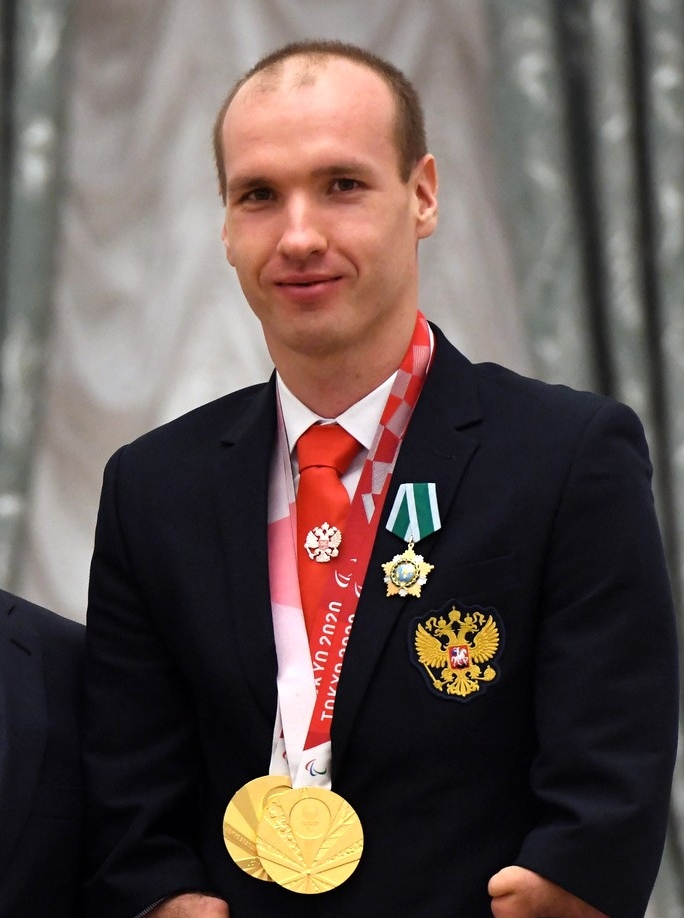

Personal information
- Full name: Mikhail Yevgenyevich Astashov
- Born: 16 October 1988 (age 38) Khandagatay, Soviet Union

Cycling career
- Sport: Cycling
- Disciplines: C1 pursuit, time trial
- Role: Rider
Medal record
Representing RPC
Para-cycling
Paralympic Games
Gold medal – first place	2020 Tokyo	Individual pursuit C1
Gold medal – first place	2020 Tokyo	Road time trial C1

Mikhail Yevgenyevich Astashov (Russian: Михаил Евгеньевич Асташов; born 16 October 1988) is a Russian Paralympic track cyclist and road cyclist, as well as a paratriathlete. He is a two-time Paralympic champion.

== Biography ==
Astashov was born 16 October 1988 in the village of Khandagay. When he was a few days old, he was taken away from his parents, after physicians and aid workers urged them to send him to a baby house, wondering, why they need such a child without hands and feet and assuring them, he won't live long anyway. When he was five he was sent to an orphanage. The time which he spent in the orphanage was positive; Astashov learned all the regular tasks, including walking. Beside that, he practiced different kind of sports, the first one being badminton, which he had to abandon due to lack of support in Ulan-Ude. Then he tried swimming and table tennis, collecting success there, before switching to athletics, which he replaced with paratriathlon (swimming, cycling and walking). He stayed in the orphanage until the age of 18, when he began searching for his family, whom he eventually found. His mother, father, and two brothers were proud and happy to welcome him back.

Astashov enrolled at the East-Siberian Institute for Culture. In addition to being a successful cyclist, he is a junior national champion in badminton, a multiple-time national champion and record holder in swimming and athletics, and a 2016 World Paratriathlon silver medalist. However, despite these achievements, his results went largely unnoticed in Russia, and he did not receive a license to compete in the Paralympics. Searching for financial support, he met Anton Shipulin, former biathlete and current State Duma deputy, in 2019. Shipulin found a solution to collect the needed money for the 2020 Summer Paralympics. However, to qualify, he needed to achieve results sufficient for the Paralympics; this was accomplished after he earned podium finishes in several national and world championships and cups. He also had the opportunity to compete in triathlon, but his classification, PTS2, is not a sanctioned category in the Paralympics.

At the Summer Paralympics, held in Tokyo in August 2021, Astashov won gold in the 2020 individual pursuit C1 event, setting a World Record in the qualifying round and overlapping Tristen Chernove in the final. He also finished fourth in the time trial C1–3 event. However, in the road time trial event he again finished first.
