= Cycling at the 2016 Summer Paralympics – Women's individual pursuit C1–3 =

Women's individual pursuit C1–3 at the XV Paralympic Games
- Dates: 8 September
- Competitors: 12 from 9 nations

Medalists
1st place, gold medalist(s)		Megan Giglia	Great Britain
2nd place, silver medalist(s)		Jamie Whitmore	United States
3rd place, bronze medalist(s)		Alyda Norbruis	Netherlands

The women's individual C1–3 took place on 8 September 2016.

The event began with a qualifying race over 3000m. Each of the eleven athletes competed individually on a time trial basis. The fastest two riders raced for the gold medal, and the third and fourth fastest riders raced for the bronze.

== Preliminaries ==
Q: Qualifier
WR: World Record
PR: Paralympic Record

Rank	Name	Country	Time
1	Megan Giglia	Great Britain	4:03.544 Q WR
2	Jamie Whitmore	United States	4:11.778 Q
3	Alyda Norbruis	Netherlands	4:12.030 Q PR
4	Sini Zeng	China	4:15.386 Q
5	Daniela Munevar	Colombia	4:21.942
6	Allison Jones	United States	4:27.038
7	Zhenling Song	China	4:28.102
8	Simone Kennedy	Australia	4:33.815
9	Tereza Diepoldova	Czech Republic	4:38.406
10	Jieli Li	China	4:43.367
11	Roxanne Burns	South Africa	4:43.478
12	Denise Schindler	Germany	Disqualified

== Finals ==
Gold medal match

Name	Time	Rank
Megan Giglia (GBR)	caught opponent	1st place, gold medalist(s)
Jamie Whitmore (USA)		2nd place, silver medalist(s)

Bronze medal match

Name	Time	Rank
Alyda Norbruis (NED)	4:10.654	3rd place, bronze medalist(s)
Sini Zeng (CHN)	4:17.730	4
