= Cycling at the 2016 Summer Paralympics – Women's time trial =

The Women's time trial cycling events at the 2016 Summer Paralympics took place on September 8–11 at Rio Olympic Velodrome. Three events took place covering six classifications.

== Classification ==
Cyclists are given a classification depending on the type and extent of their disability. The classification system allows cyclists to compete against others with a similar level of function. The class number indicates the severity of impairment with "1" being most impaired.

Cycling classes for track cycling are:

- B: Blind and visually impaired cyclists use a Tandem bicycle with a sighted pilot on the front
- C 1-5: Cyclists with an impairment that affects their legs, arms and/or trunk but are capable of using a standard bicycle

== Women's time trials ==
=== C1-3 ===
Class	Gold	Silver	Bronze
C1–3 (500 m)	Alyda Norbruis; Netherlands	Amanda Reid; Australia	Song Zhenling; China

=== C4-5 ===
Class	Gold	Silver	Bronze
C4–5 (500 m)	Kadeena Cox; Great Britain	Zhou Jufang; China	Ruan Jianping; China

=== B ===
Class	Gold	Silver	Bronze
B (1 km)	Sophie Thornhill; Great Britain	Larissa Klaassen; Netherlands	Jessica Gallagher; Australia
