= List of world records in track para-cycling =

This is the list of world records in track para-cycling.

== Men's records ==
denotes a performance that is also a current Paralympic record. Statistics are correct as of 1 September 2024.

Event	Record	Athlete	Class	Nationality	Date	Meet	Place	Ref
Flying 200m time trial	9.568	Neil Fachie; Matt Rotherham (pilot)	B	Great Britain	7 April 2018	Commonwealth Games	Brisbane, Australia	
Flying 200m time trial	10.381	Blaine Hunt	C5	Great Britain	20 October 2022	World Championships	Saint-Quentin-en-Yvelines, France	
Flying 200m time trial	10.298	Korey Boddington	C4	Australia	14 February 2025	Oceania Championships	Brisbane, Australia	
Flying 200m time trial	10.740	Devon Briggs	C3	New Zealand	29 October 2026	World Championships	Apeldoorn, Netherlands	
Flying 200m time trial	11.212	Alexandre Léauté	C2	France	20 October 2022	World Championships	Saint-Quentin-en-Yvelines, France	
Flying 200m time trial	11.641	Li Zhangyu	C1	China	21 March 2024	World Championships	Rio de Janeiro, Brazil	
1km time trial	1:01.557	Alfonso Cabello	C5	Spain	26 August 2021	Paralympic Games	Izu, Japan	
1km time trial	1:01.466	Jody Cundy	C4	Great Britain	12 April 2014	World Championships	Aguascalientes, Mexico	
1km time trial	1:04.825	Jaco van Gass	C3	Great Britain	31 August 2024	Paralympic Games	Saint-Quentin-en-Yvelines, France	
1km time trial	1:07.944	Alexandre Léauté	C2	France	31 August 2024	Paralympic Games	Saint-Quentin-en-Yvelines, France	
1km time trial	1:08.347	Li Zhangyu	C1	China	27 August 2021	Paralympic Games	Izu, Japan	
1km time trial	58.038	Neil Fachie; Matt Rotherham (pilot)	B	Great Britain	28 August 2021	Paralympic Games	Izu, Japan	
3000m pursuit (progression)	3:15.488	Jaco van Gass	C3	Great Britain	30 August 2024	Paralympic Games	Saint-Quentin-en-Yvelines, France	
3000m pursuit (progression)	3:24.298	Alexandre Léauté	C2	France	30 August 2024	Paralympic Games	Saint-Quentin-en-Yvelines, France	
3000m pursuit (progression)	3:31.338	Li Zhangyu	C1	China	29 August 2024	Paralympic Games	Saint-Quentin-en-Yvelines, France	
4000m pursuit (progression)	4:13.934	Dorian Foulon	C5	France	31 August 2024	Paralympic Games	Saint-Quentin-en-Yvelines, France	
4000m pursuit (progression)	4:17.700	Archie Atkinson	C4	Great Britain	31 August 2024	Paralympic Games	Saint-Quentin-en-Yvelines, France	
4000m pursuit (progression)	3:55.396	Tristan Bangma; Patrick Bos (pilot)	B	Netherlands	29 August 2024	Paralympic Games	Saint-Quentin-en-Yvelines, France	
Hour record	52.054 km	Franz-Josef Lässer	C5	Austria	6 August 2026		Grenchen, Switzerland.	
Hour record	47.904 km	John Terrell	C4	United States	12 October 2023		Aguascalientes, Mexico	
Hour record	41.817 km	Darren Kenny	C3	Great Britain	8 January 2005		Manchester, Great Britain	
Hour record	46.521 km	Ewoud Vromant	C2	Belgium	16 July 2022		Grenchen, Switzerland	
Hour record	42.583 km	Michael Teuber	C1	Germany	30 November 2018		Berlin, Germany	
Hour record	49.625 km	Herve Deschamps; Guy Rouchouze (pilot)	B	France	29 November 1997		Bordeaux, France	

== Women's records ==
denotes a performance that is also a current Paralympic record. Statistics are correct as of 1 September 2024.

Event	Record	Athlete	Class	Nationality	Date	Meet	Place	Ref
Flying 200m time trial (progression)	10.609	Sophie Thornhill; Helen Scott (pilot)	B	Great Britain	5 April 2018	Commonwealth Games	Brisbane, Australia	
Flying 200m time trial (progression)	11.605	Marie Patouillet	C5	France	20 October 2022	World Championships	Saint-Quentin-en-Yvelines, France	
Flying 200m time trial (progression)	11.409	Kadeena Cox	C4	Great Britain	31 October 2026	World Championships	Apeldoorn, Netherlands	
Flying 200m time trial (progression)	12.506	Wang Xiaomei	C3	China	23 March 2024	World Championships	Rio de Janeiro, Brazil	
Flying 200m time trial (progression)	13.037	Flurina Rigling	C2	Switzerland	31 October 2026	World Championships	Apeldoorn, Netherlands	
Flying 200m time trial (progression)	13.367	Qian Wangwei	C1	China	6 August 2023	World Championships	Glasgow, United Kingdom	
500m time trial (progression)	35.390	Caroline Groot	C5	Netherlands	29 August 2024	Paralympic Games	Saint-Quentin-en-Yvelines, France	
500m time trial (progression)	34.812	Kadeena Cox	C4	Great Britain	27 August 2021	Paralympic Games	Izu, Japan	
500m time trial (progression)	38.512	Mel Pemble	C3	Canada	31 August 2024	Paralympic Games	Saint-Quentin-en-Yvelines, France	
500m time trial (progression)	38.162	Amanda Reid	C2	Australia	6 August 2023	World Championships	Glasgow, United Kingdom	
500m time trial (progression)	40.878	Qian Wangwei	C1	China	31 August 2024	Paralympic Games	Saint-Quentin-en-Yvelines, France	
1 km time trial	1:11.390	Li Huiling	C5	China	19 October 2026	Asian Para Games	Izu, Japan	
1 km time trial	1:09.545	Kadeena Cox	C4	Great Britain	30 October 2026	World Championships	Apeldoorn, Netherlands	
1 km time trial	1:14.630	Emily Petricola	C3	Australia	17 October 2025	World Championships	Rio de Janeiro, Brazil	
1 km time trial	1:16.750	Flurina Rigling	C2	Switzerland	29 October 2026	World Championships	Apeldoorn, Netherlands	
1 km time trial	1:20.417	Qian Wangwei	C1	China	20 October 2026	Asian Para Games	Izu, Japan	
1 km time trial	1:04.623	Sophie Thornhill; Helen Scott (pilot)	B	Great Britain	5 April 2018	Commonwealth Games	Brisbane, Australia	
3000m pursuit (progression)	3:27.057	Sarah Storey	C5	Great Britain	25 August 2021	Paralympic Games	Izu, Japan	
3000m pursuit (progression)	3:35.856	Emily Petricola	C4	Australia	30 August 2024	Paralympic Games	Saint-Quentin-en-Yvelines, France	
3000m pursuit (progression)	3:41.692	Wang Xiaomei	C3	China	29 August 2024	Paralympic Games	Saint-Quentin-en-Yvelines, France	
3000m pursuit (progression)	3:45.133	Daphne Schrager	C2	Great Britain	29 August 2024	Paralympic Games	Saint-Quentin-en-Yvelines, France	
3000m pursuit (progression)	4:10.301	Qian Wangwei	C1	China	19 October 2026	Asian Para Games	Izu, Japan	
3000m pursuit (progression)	3:17.643	Sophie Unwin; Jenny Holl (pilot)	B	Great Britain	1 September 2024	Paralympic Games	Saint-Quentin-en-Yvelines, France	
4000m pursuit (progression)	5:05.764	Morgan Newberry	C5	Great Britain	30 July 2026	Commonwealth Games	Glasgow, United Kingdom	
4000m pursuit (progression)	4:49.648	Tara Neyland	C4	Australia	30 July 2026	Commonwealth Games	Glasgow, United Kingdom	
4000m pursuit (progression)	4:29.672	Emma Foy; Jessie Hodges (pilot)	B	New Zealand	30 October 2026	World Championships	Apeldoorn, Netherlands	
Hour record	45.502 km	Sarah Storey	C5	Great Britain	28 February 2015	Revolution Series	London, Great Britain	
Hour record	42.930 km	Lindy Hou; Toireasa Gallagher (pilot)	B	Australia	29 November 1997		Sydney, Australia	

== Mixed records ==
Key to tables: Not ratified or later rescined by UCI

Event	Record	Athlete	Class	Nationality	Date	Meet	Place	Ref
Team sprint	49.013	Jessica Gallagher; Jacqui Mengler-Mohr (pilot); Kane Perris; Luke Zaccaria (pilot)	B	Australia	10 February 2026	Oceania Championships	Cambridge, New Zealand	
Team sprint	48.901	Libby Clegg; Georgia Holt (pilot); James Ball; Steffan Lloyd (pilot)	B	Great Britain	20 October 2022	World Championships	Saint-Quentin-en-Yvelines, France	
Team sprint	47.579	Kadeena Cox; Jaco van Gass; Jody Cundy	C1–5	Great Britain	28 August 2021	Paralympic Games	Izu, Japan	
