= Cycling at the 2020 Summer Paralympics – Men's individual pursuit C1 =

Men's individual pursuit C1 at the XVI Paralympic Games
- Venue: Izu Velodrome
- Dates: 26 August 2021
- Competitors: 10 from 9 nations

Medalists
| 1st place, gold medalist(s) | | Mikhail Astashov | RPC |
| 2nd place, silver medalist(s) | | Tristen Chernove | Canada |
| 3rd place, bronze medalist(s) | | Li Zhangyu | China |

The men's individual pursuit class C1 track cycling event at the 2020 Summer Paralympics took place on 26 August 2021 at the Izu Velodrome, Japan. This class is for the cyclists who have impairments that affect their legs, arms, and/or trunk but are still capable to use a standard bicycle. 10 cyclists from 9 nations will be competing in this event.

== Competition format ==
The competition begins with the qualifying round where all 10 cyclists are divided into 5 heats; each heat having 2 cyclists. They will be competing on a time trial basis. The 2 fastest in the qualifying round would qualify to the gold medal final while the 3rd and 4th fastest will qualify to the bronze medal final. The distance of this event is 3000m. The event finals are held on the same day as the qualifying.

== Schedule ==
All times are Japan Standard Time (UTC+9)

| Date | Time | Round |
|---|---|---|
| Thursday, 26 August | 10:30 | Qualifying |
| Thursday, 26 August | 15:03 | Finals |

== Records ==
| World Record | Li Zhangyu (CHN) | 3:45.469 | Milton, Canada | 30 January 2020 |
| Paralympic Record | Li Zhangyu (CHN) | 3:50.373 | Rio de Janeiro, Brazil | 9 September 2016 |

== Results ==
=== Qualifying ===
| Rank | Heat | Nation | Cyclists | Result | Notes |
|---|---|---|---|---|---|
| 1 | 1 | RPC | Mikhail Astashov | 3:35.954 | QG, WR |
| 2 | 4 | Canada | Tristen Chernove | 3:40.591 | QG |
| 3 | 5 | China | Li Zhangyu | 3:41.164 | QB |
| 4 | 5 | Spain | Ricardo Ten Argilés | 3:42.795 | QB |
| 5 | 4 | United States | Aaron Keith | 3:45.354 | |
| 6 | 3 | Germany | Pierre Senska | 3:50.016 | |
| 7 | 3 | Malaysia | Mohamad Yusof Hafizi Shaharuddin | 3:58.413 | |
| 8 | 2 | Germany | Michael Teuber | 3:59.521 | |
| 9 | 2 | Argentina | Rodrigo Fernando López | 4:17.864 | |
| 10 | 1 | Brazil | Carlos Alberto Gomes Soares | 4:26.763 | |

=== Finals ===
| Rank | Nation | Cyclists | Result | Notes |
|---|---|---|---|---|
Gold medal final
| 1st place, gold medalist(s) | RPC | Mikhail Astashov | | |
| 2nd place, silver medalist(s) | Canada | Tristen Chernove | OVL | |
Bronze medal final
| 3rd place, bronze medalist(s) | China | Li Zhangyu | 3:39.273 | |
| 4 | Spain | Ricardo Ten Argilés | 3:43.351 | |
