= Cycling at the 2020 Summer Paralympics – Men's time trial C1–3 =

Men's time trial C1–3 at the XVI Paralympic Games
- Venue: Izu Velodrome
- Dates: 27 August 2021
- Competitors: 22 from 17 nations

Medalists
1st place, gold medalist(s)		Li Zhangyu	China
2nd place, silver medalist(s)		Alexandre Léauté	France
3rd place, bronze medalist(s)		Jaco van Gass	Great Britain

The men's time trial class C1-3 track cycling event at the 2020 Summer Paralympics took place on 27 August 2021 at the Izu Velodrome, Japan. This combine class (C1-3) under classification C is for cyclists who have impairments that affect their legs, arms, and/or trunk but are still capable to use a standard bicycle. 22 cyclists from 17 nations competed in this event.

== Competition format ==
The competition immediately begins with the finals, where the 23 cyclists will individually in their own heat, compete by doing a time trial basis where the fastest cyclist will win gold, the 2nd fastest a silver, and the 3rd fastest a bronze. The distance of this event is 1000m. A cyclist may have a different official time than their real-time due to this event being a combined class event (C1-3), and some cyclists in their own class may have a disadvantage over other classes (for example due to speed), thus athlete factor was used where those in C1 has 93.46, C2 93.96 and C3 100.00. The time cyclist from class C3 gets will be their official time while those in C1 and 2 can have it lesser due to the factor.

== Schedule ==
All times are Japan Standard Time (UTC+9)

Date	Time	Round
Friday, 27 August	13:20	Finals

== Records ==
Men's C1 1000m Time Trial

World Record	Li Zhangyu (CHN)	1:11.166	Milton, Canada	31 January 2020
Paralympic Record	Li Zhangyu (CHN)	1:11.937	Rio de Janeiro, Brazil	10 September 2016

Men's C2 1000m Time Trial

World Record	Alexandre Léauté (FRA)	1:11.373	Milton, Canada	31 January 2020
Paralympic Record	Tristen Chernove (CAN)	1:14.716	Rio de Janeiro, Brazil	9 September 2016

Men's C3 1000m Time Trial

World Record	Alexey Obydennov (RUS)	1:06.131	Aguascalientes, Mexico	12 April 2014
Paralympic Record	Darren Kenny (GBR)	1:08.668	Beijing, China	9 September 2008

== Results ==
Rank	Heat	Nation	Cyclists	Class	Real time	Factored time	Notes
1st place, gold medalist(s)	19	China	Li Zhangyu	C1	1:08.347	1:03.877	WR
2nd place, silver medalist(s)	18	France	Alexandre Léauté	C2	1:09.211	1:05.031	WR
3rd place, bronze medalist(s)	22	Great Britain	Jaco van Gass	C3	1:05.569	1:05.569	WR
4	2	RPC	Mikhail Astashov	C1	1:10.450	1:05.843	
5	17	Australia	Gordon Allan	C2	1:10.331	1:06.083	
6	13	Japan	Shota Kawamoto	C2	1:12.936	1:08.531	
7	20	Belgium	Diederick Schelfhout	C3	1:08.825	1:08.825	
8	11	Spain	Ricardo Ten Argilés	C1	1:13.794	1:08.968	
9	21	Spain	Eduardo Santas Asensio	C3	1:08.992	1:08.992	
10	12	China	Liang Guihua	C2	1:13.907	1:08.968	
11	23	United States	Joseph Berenyi	C3	1:09.582	1:09.582	
10	9	United States	Aaron Keith	C1	1:15.682	1:10.732	
12	10	RPC	Arslan Gilmutdinov	C2	1:15.691	1:11.119	
13	14	Colombia	Alejandro Perea Arango	C3	1:11.423	1:11.423	
14	15	Japan	Masaki Fujita	C3	1:12.306	1:12.306	
15	8	Czech Republic	Ivo Koblasa	C2	1:17.287	1:12.619	
16	6	Romania	Eduard Mihaita Moescu	C2	1:21.089	1:16.191	
17	7	Argentina	Rodrigo Fernando Lopez	C1	1:22.594	1:17.192	
18	3	Sweden	Henrik Marvig	C3	1:18.100	1:18.100	
19	5	Brazil	Carlos Alberto Gomes Soares	C1	1:24.411	1:18.891	
20	4	Venezuela	Victor Hugo Garrido Marquez	C2	1:27.534	1:22.247	
22	1	Cuba	Damian Lopez Alfonso	C1	1:30.047	1:24.158	
	16	Canada	Tristen Chernove	C1	DNS		
