= Cycling at the 2012 Summer Paralympics – Women's road race C1–3 =

Cycling, women's road race C1–3 at the XIV Paralympic Games
- Venue: Brands Hatch
- Dates: 6 September 2012
- Competitors: 9 from 7 nations

Medalists
1st place, gold medalist(s)		Zeng Sini	China
2nd place, silver medalist(s)		Denise Schindler	Germany
3rd place, bronze medalist(s)		Allison Jones	United States

The women's road race C1–3 event in cycling at the 2012 Summer Paralympics took place on 6 September at Brands Hatch. Nine riders from seven different nations competed. The race distance was 48 km.

== Results ==
DNF = Did Not Finish

Rank	Name	Country	Class	Time
1st place, gold medalist(s)	Zeng Sini	China	C2	1:29:02
2nd place, silver medalist(s)	Denise Schindler	Germany	C3	1:29:11
3rd place, bronze medalist(s)	Allison Jones	United States	C2	1:29:11
4	Tereza Diepoldova	Czech Republic	C2	1:29:48
5	Raquel Acinas Poncelas	Spain	C2	1:39:51
6	Simone Kennedy	Australia	C3	1:52:32
	Anita Ruetz	Austria	C2	DNF
	Jayme Paris	Australia	C1	DNF
	He Yin	China	C2	DNF
