= Cycling at the 2020 Summer Paralympics – Men's road time trial C1 =

Men's road time trial C1 at the XVI Paralympic Games
- Venue: Fuji Speedway
- Dates: 31 August 2021
- Competitors: 11 from 10 nations
- Winning time: 24:53.37

Medalists
1st place, gold medalist(s)		Mikhail Astashov	RPC
2nd place, silver medalist(s)		Aaron Keith	United States
3rd place, bronze medalist(s)		Michael Teuber	Germany

The men's time trial class C1 road cycling event at the 2020 Summer Paralympics took place on 31 August 2021 at Fuji Speedway, Japan. 11 riders from 10 nations competed in this event.

The C1 classification is for cyclists with severe hemiplegic or diplegic spasticity; severe athetosis or ataxia; bilateral through knee amputation, etcetera.

== Results ==
The event took place on 31 August 2021, at 8:41:

Rank	Rider	Nation	Time	Deficit
1st place, gold medalist(s)	Mikhail Astashov	RPC	24:53.37	
2nd place, silver medalist(s)	Aaron Keith	United States	24:55.40	+2.03
3rd place, bronze medalist(s)	Michael Teuber	Germany	24:58.67	+5.30
4	Pierre Senska	Germany	26:25.41	+1:32.04
5	Mohamad Yusof Hafizi Shaharuddin	Malaysia	26:46.56	+1:53.19
6	Li Zhangyu	China	27:23.62	+2:30.25
7	Ross Wilson	Canada	27:57.31	+3:03.94
8	Carlos Alberto Gomes Soares	Brazil	28:13.44	+3:20.07
9	Rodrigo Fernando Lopez	Argentina	30:01.61	+5:08.24
10	Damian Lopez Alfonso	Cuba	30:45.20	+5:51.83
	Ricardo Ten Argilés	Spain	DNF	
