= Paralympic record progression track cycling – Women's 1 km time trial =

This is an overview of the progression of the Paralympic track cycling record of the women's 1 km time trial as recognised by the Union Cycliste Internationale (UCI) and IPC.

== B Progression ==
Time	Cyclists	Class	Location	Track	Date	Competition	Ref
1:11.467	Claudio Costa (ITA); Patrizia Spadaccini (ITA)	M/WB	Atlanta (USA)	Indoor track	17 August 1996	1996 Paralympics	
1:13.473	Teresa Poole (AUS); Sandra Smith (AUS)	B	Atlanta (USA)	Indoor track	17 August 1996	1996 Paralympics	
1:11.927	Sarnya Parker (AUS); Tania Modra (AUS)	B	Athens (GRE)	Indoor track	20 October 2000	2000 Paralympics	
1:11.160	Aileen Mcglynn (GBR); Ellen Hunter (GBR)	B	Athens (GRE)	Indoor track	21 September 2004	2004 Paralympics	
1:08.919	Felicity Johnson (AUS); Stephanie Morton (AUS)	B	Athens (GRE)	Indoor track	31 August 2012	2012 Paralympics	
1:06.283	Sophie Thornhill (GBR); Helen Scott (GBR)	B	Rio (BRA)	Indoor track	9 September 2016	2016 Paralympics	
1:05.291	Larissa Klaassen (NED); Imke Brommer (NED)	B	Izu (JPN)	Indoor track	26 August 2021	2020 Paralympic Games	
