= Paralympic record progression track cycling – Men's flying 200 m time trial =

This is an overview of the progression of the Paralympic track cycling record of the men's flying 200 m time trial as recognised by the Union Cycliste Internationale (UCI) and IPC.

== B Progression ==
Time	Cyclists	Class	Location	Track	Date	Competition	Ref
11.247	Vincent Mignon (FRA); Eric Guezo (FRA)	B	Atlanta (USA)	Indoor track	18 August 1996	1996 Paralympics	
10.918	Jan Szojka (SVK); Juraj Petrovic (SVK)	B	Sydney (AUS)	Indoor track	23 October 2000	2000 Paralympics	
10.771	Kieran Modra (AUS); David Short (AUS)	B	London (GBR)	Indoor track	20 September 2004	2004 Paralympics	
10.050	Anthony Kappes (GBR); Barney Storey (GBR)	B	London (GBR)	Indoor track	2 September 2012	2012 Paralympics	
