= Paralympic record progression track cycling – Women's flying 200 m time trial =

Event

This is an overview of the progression of the Paralympic track cycling record of the women's flying 200 m time trial as recognised by the Union Cycliste Internationale (UCI) and IPC.

== B Progression ==
Time	Cyclists	Class	Location	Track	Date	Competition	Ref
11"940	Cara Dunne (USA); Scott Evans (USA)	M/WB	Atlanta (USA)	Indoor track	18 August 1996	1996 Paralympics	
11"505	Pamela Fernandes (USA); Alphonso Whaley (USA)	M/WB	Sydney (AUS)	Indoor track	22 October 2000	2000 Paralympics	
11"675	Cara Dunne (USA); Scott Evans (USA)	B	Athens (GRE)	Indoor track	19 September 2004	2004 Paralympics	
