= Track cycling at the 2026 Commonwealth Games – Women's individual pursuit C4–5 =

Cycling Track – Women's individual pursuit C4–5 at the 2026 Commonwealth Games
- Venue: Sir Chris Hoy Velodrome
- Dates: 30 July
- Competitors: 6 from 4 nations
- Winning time: 4:46.614

Medalists
gold medal	Tara Neyland	Australia
silver medal	Morgan Newberry	England
bronze medal	Nicole Murray	New Zealand

The women's individual pursuit C4-5 at the 2026 Commonwealth Games was part of the cycling programme, and took place on 30 July 2026. The event, held for the first time in Glasgow, was won by Tara Neyland of Australia.

== Records ==
Prior to this competition, existing world records in the C4 and C5 classifications at the extended distance had not been established; the fastest C4 and C5 cyclists in qualification were therefore recognised as the new world and Commonwealth Games records holders for their classification.

== Schedule ==
The schedule was as follows:

All times are British Summer Time (UTC+1)

Date	Time	Round
Thursday 30 July 2026	12:29	Qualifying
Thursday 30 July 2026	18:16 / 18:23	Finals

== Results ==
=== Qualifying ===
The two fastest riders advanced to the gold medal final. The next two fastest riders advanced to the bronze medal final.

Rank	Name	Country	Classification	Real Time	Factor (%)	Factored Time	Notes
1	Tara Neyland	Australia	C4	4:49.648	98.67	4:45.796	QG, WR C4
2	Morgan Newberry	England	C5	5:06.470	100	5:06.470	QG, WR C5
3	Nicole Murray	New Zealand	C5	5:06.878	100	5:06.878	QB
4	Erin Normoyle	Australia	C4	5:28.635	98.67	5:24.264	QB
5	Kadeena Cox	England	C4	6:42.472	98.67	6:37.119	
6	Lisha Das	India	C5	6:58.000	100	6:58.000	

=== Finals ===
The finals took place on the afternoon of 30 July.

For gold

Rank	Name	Country	Classification	Real Time	Factor (%)	Factored Time	Notes
1st place, gold medalist(s)	Tara Neyland	Australia	C4	4:50.477	98.67	4:46.614	
2nd place, silver medalist(s)	Morgan Newberry	England	C5	5:05.764	100	5:05.764	WR C5

For bronze

Rank	Name	Country	Classification	Real Time	Factor (%)	Factored Time	Notes
3rd place, bronze medalist(s)	Nicole Murray	New Zealand	C5	5:06.199	100	5:06.199	
4	Erin Normoyle	Australia	C4	5:39.140	98.67	5:34.629	
