= Khandagay =

Khandagay Хандагай
- Settlement
- Location within Republic of Buryatia Location within Russia
- Coordinates: 52°00′N 109°07′E
- Country: Russia
- Region: Republic of Buryatia
- District: Khorinsky District
- Time zone: UTC+8:00

Khandagay (Russian: Хандагай) is a rural locality (a settlement) in Khorinsky District, Republic of Buryatia, Russia. The population was 448 as of 2010. There are 9 streets.

== Geography ==
Khandagay is located 61 km southwest of Khorinsk (the district's administrative centre) by road. Tarbagatay is the nearest rural locality.
