= Cycling at the 2004 Summer Paralympics – Women's individual pursuit =

Women's Individual Pursuit Tandem B1-3 at the XII Paralympic Games
- Paralympic Cycling (track)
- Venue: Olympic Velodrome
- Dates: 21–22 September 2004
- Competitors: 12 from 9 nations

Medalists
1st place, gold medalist(s)		Karissa Whitsell; Katie Compton	United States
2nd place, silver medalist(s)		Lindy Hou; Toireasa Ryan	Australia
3rd place, bronze medalist(s)		Janet Shaw; Kelly McCombie	Australia

The Women's individual pursuit tandem B1-3 track cycling event at the 2004 Summer Paralympics was competed on 21 & 22 September. It was won by Karissa Whitsell and her sighted pilot Katie Compton, representing United States.

== Qualifying ==
21 Sept. 2004, 10:10

Qualified for next round

Rank	Athlete	Time	Notes
1	Karissa Whitsell (USA); Katie Compton (USA)	3:38.80	PR
2	Lindy Hou (AUS); Toireasa Ryan (AUS)	3:39.69	
3	Janet Shaw (AUS); Kelly McCombie (AUS)	3:42.44	
4	May Britt Hartwell (NOR); Tone Gravvold (NOR)	3:46.58	
5	Michaela Fuchs (GER); Eva Fuenfgeld (GER)	3:49.10	
6	Iryna Fiadotava (BLR); Aksana Zviahintsava (BLR)	3:50.60	
7	Yan Xiaolei (CHN); Xu Yi Mei (CHN)	3:51.15	
8	Shawn Marsolais (CAN); Lisa Sweeney (CAN)	3:54.83	
9	Ana Miguelez (ESP); Beatriz Eva Grande (ESP)	3:58.18	
10	Natallia Piatrova (BLR); Yadviha Skorabahataya (BLR)	4:00.60	
11	Merja Hanski (FIN); Virve Taljavirta (FIN)	4:01.46	
	Lyn Lepore (AUS); Jenny MacPherson (AUS)	DNS	

== 1st round ==
22 Sept. 2004, 10:10

Qualified for gold final
Qualified for bronze final

Heat 1

Rank	Athlete	Time	Notes
1	May Britt Hartwell (NOR); Tone Gravvold (NOR)	3:44.66	
2	Michaela Fuchs (GER); Eva Fuenfgeld (GER)	3:47.92	

Heat 2

Rank	Athlete	Time	Notes
1	Janet Shaw (AUS); Kelly McCombie (AUS)	3:42.24	
2	Iryna Fiadotava (BLR); Aksana Zviahintsava (BLR)	3:49.42	

Heat 3

Rank	Athlete	Time	Notes
1	Lindy Hou (AUS); Toireasa Ryan (AUS)	3:38.48	WR
2	Yan Xiaolei (CHN); Xu Yi Mei (CHN)	OVL	

Heat 4

Rank	Athlete	Time	Notes
1	Karissa Whitsell (USA); Katie Compton (USA)	3:39.56	
2	Shawn Marsolais (CAN); Lisa Sweeney (CAN)	OVL	

== Final round ==
22 Sept. 2004, 12:15

Gold

Rank	Athlete	Time	Notes
1st place, gold medalist(s)	Karissa Whitsell (USA); Katie Compton (USA)	3:36.82	WR
2nd place, silver medalist(s)	Lindy Hou (AUS); Toireasa Ryan (AUS)	3:39.32	

Bronze

Rank	Athlete	Time	Notes
3rd place, bronze medalist(s)	Janet Shaw (AUS); Kelly McCombie (AUS)	3:42.30	
4	May Britt Hartwell (NOR); Tone Gravvold (NOR)	3:46.18	
