= John Terrell =

American Para-cyclist

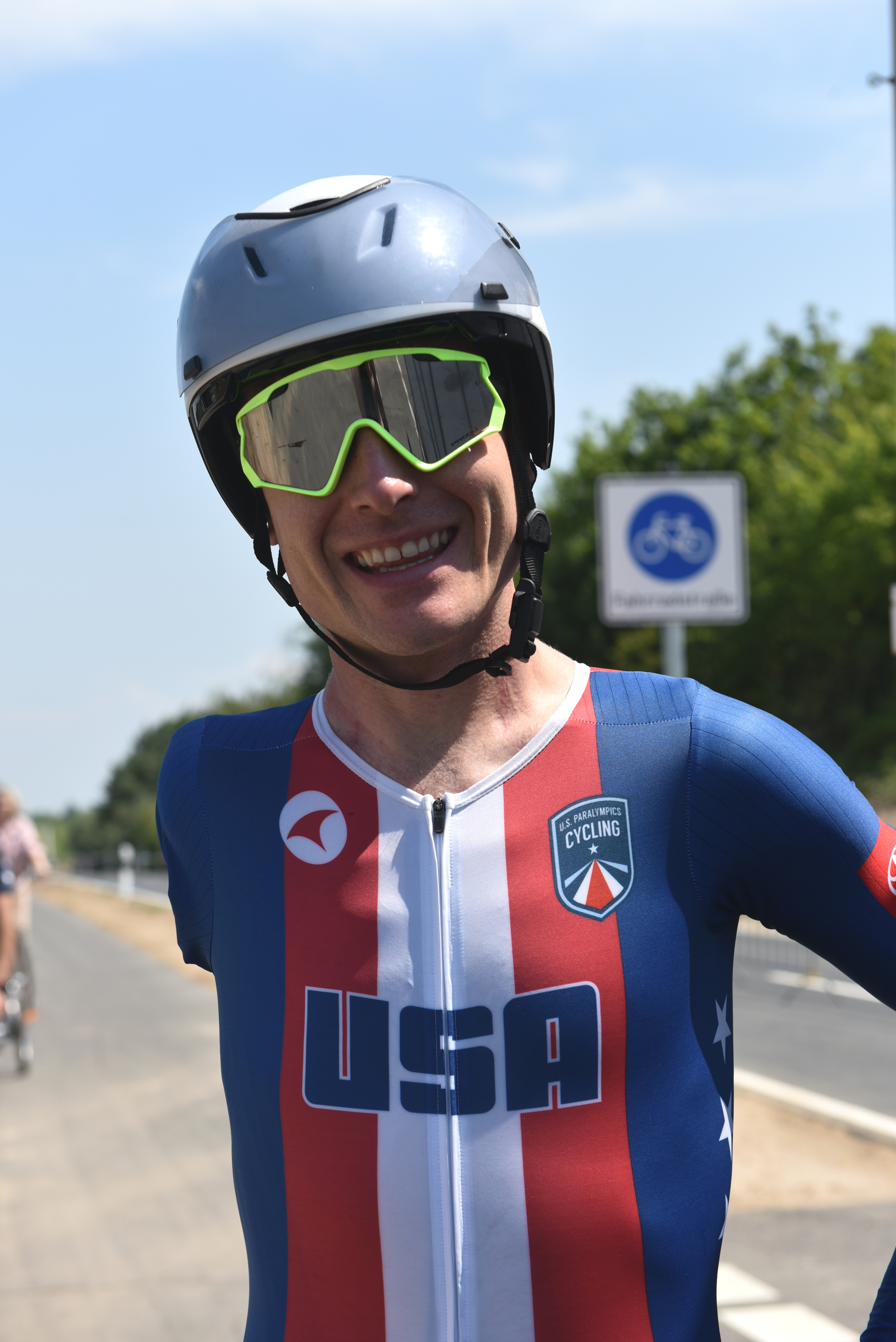
- John Terrell in 2022

Personal information
- Nationality: American
- Born: Converse, Texas

Sport
- Sport: Para-cycling
- Disability: Brachial plexus injury
- Disability class: C4
Medal record
Men's para-cycling
Representing United States
Track World Championships
Bronze medal – third place	2022 Saint-Quentin-en-Yvelines	Scratch race C4
Bronze medal – third place	2022 Saint-Quentin-en-Yvelines	Omnium C4

John Terrell is an American para-cyclist who represents the United States internationally.

== Career ==
Terrell made his international debut for the United States at the 2022 UCI Para-cycling Road World Cup where he won a silver medal in the first world cup time trial and a gold medal in the second event.

He represented the United States at the 2022 UCI Para-cycling Road World Championships, where he competed with a broken sternum and bruised lung and finished in sixth place in the road race.

Terrell represented the United States at the 2022 UCI Para-cycling Track World Championships where he won a bronze medal in the scratch race and omnium events.

== Personal life ==
Terrell was hit by a car as a pedestrian at the age of 19 and experienced a brachial plexus injury as a result of blunt-force trauma. He tried to salvage his limbs for over two years, but the nerve transplant surgeries were unsuccessful, and he had his right arm amputated.
