= Tristen Chernove =

Canadian Paralympic cyclist

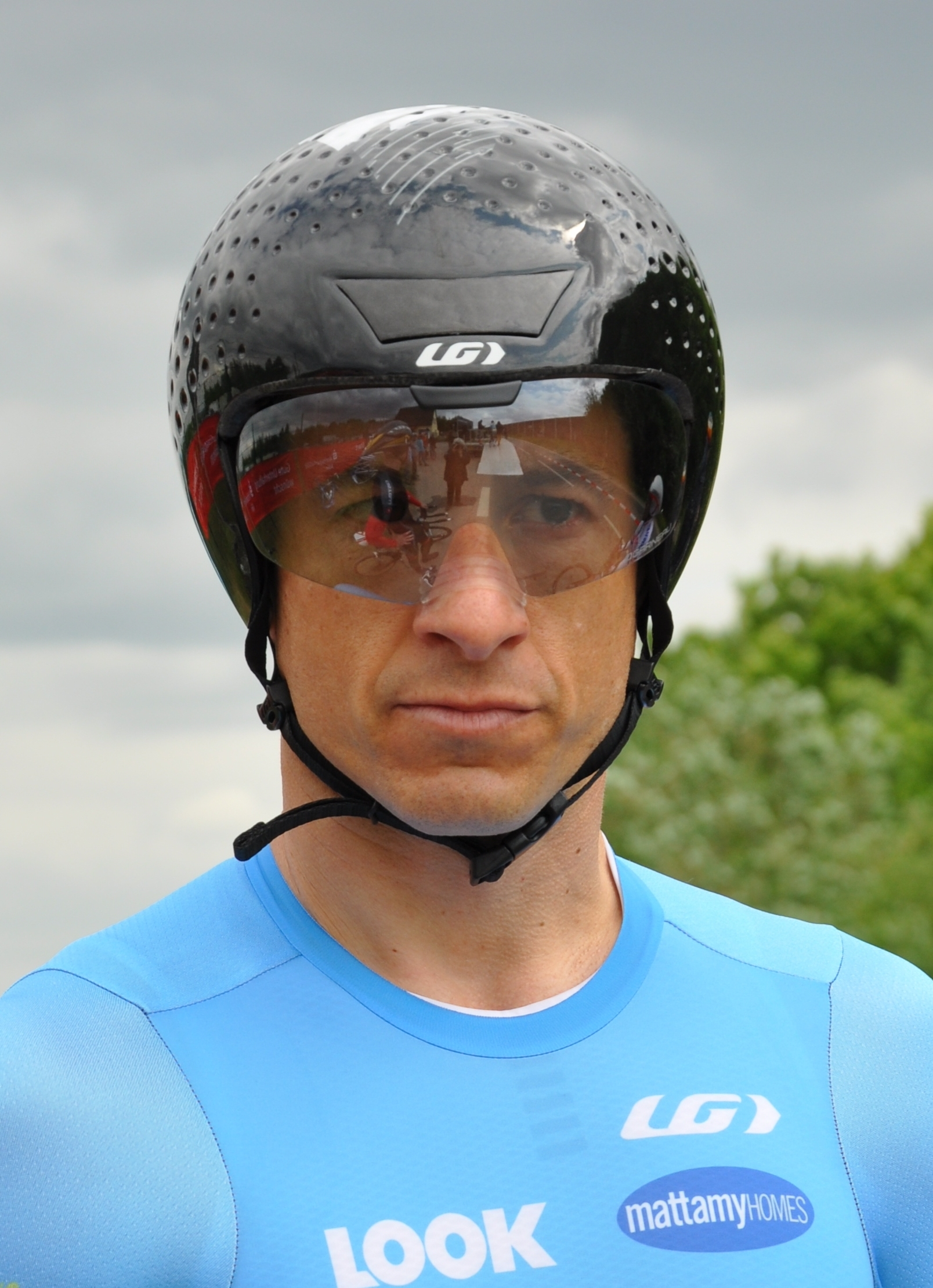
- Chernove in 2016

Personal information
- Born: May 22, 1975 (age 51) Powell River, British Columbia, Canada

Cycling career
- Sport: Cycling
Medal record
Representing Canada
Paralympic Games
Cycling
Gold medal – first place	2016 Rio de Janeiro	Road time trial C2
Silver medal – second place	2016 Rio de Janeiro	Individual pursuit C2
Bronze medal – third place	2016 Rio de Janeiro	1 km time trial C1–3
Silver medal – second place	2020 Tokyo	Individual pursuit C1

Tristen Chernove (born May 22, 1975) is a Canadian retired Para cyclist and entrepreneur.

== Early life ==
Chernove was born on May 22, 1975. He graduated from Max Cameron High School in Powell River, British Columbia. Chernove was diagnosed with Charcot–Marie–Tooth disease in 2009, which he inherited from his mother. After the diagnosis, Chernove switched from competitive paddling to cycling.

In 2001, Chernove accepted a position at the Vancouver International Airport as a trainer and manager in emergency services. While driving a converted bus in Mexico, Chernove hit a section of the road that was unpaved and was thrown from the bus causing his back to break.

== Career ==
In May 2015, Chernove was convinced by a videographer for Tourism Alberta to try out for para-cycling. Intrigued by the idea, Chernove contacted the director of Cycling Canada's para-cycling program who invited him to a try-out. He qualified for the Canadian National Team and won a silver medal in the C2 3000-metre individual pursuit at the 2016 Summer Paralympics. He also earned a bronze medal in the 1,000-metre time trial and a gold medal in another time trial. As a result, he was named Canadian Para-Cyclist of the Year in December 2016.

The next year, Chernove competed with Team Canada at the 2017 Para-cycling Track World Championships, where he won gold and his second World Championship title. He later won a silver and a bronze medallist at the 2018 UCI Para-cycling Road World Cup. In December 2018, Chernove was again named Canadian Para-Cyclist of the Year.

On January 11, 2019, he was named a finalist for BC Athlete of the Year Award. Later, Chernove won a gold and silver medal at the 2019 UCI Para-cycling Road World Cup. On September 6, 2019, Chernove was selected to compete for Team Canada at the 2019 UCI Para-cycling Road World Championships. He ended the tournament with a gold medal in the C2 category scratch race, a silver medal in the individual pursuit, and a bronze in the 1,000 metre time trial.

While competing with the Canadian National Team, Chernove also sits as CEO of Elevate Airports Inc.

At the 2020 Summer Paralympics, he won silver in the C1 3000m individual pursuit. He withdrew from the C1 3000m time trial and announced his retirement from the sport.

== Personal life ==
Chernove and his wife have two daughters together.
