= Khandagatay =

Khandagatay Хандагатай
- Selo
- Location within Republic of Buryatia Location within Russia
- Coordinates: 51°16′24″N 107°19′04″E
- Country: Russia
- Region: Republic of Buryatia
- District: Tarbagataysky District
- Time zone: UTC+8:00

Khandagatay (Russian: Хандагатай; Buryat: Хандагата, Khandagata) is a rural locality (a selo) in Tarbagataysky District, Republic of Buryatia, Russia. The population was 286 as of 2010. There are 4 streets.

== Geography ==
Khandagatay is located 38 km southwest of Tarbagatay (the district's administrative centre) by road. Barykino-Klyuchi is the nearest rural locality.
