= Cycling at the 2020 Summer Paralympics – Men's individual pursuit C3 =

Men's individual pursuit C3 at the XVI Paralympic Games
- Venue: Izu Velodrome
- Dates: 26 August 2021
- Competitors: 8 from 7 nations

Medalists
1st place, gold medalist(s)		Jaco van Gass	Great Britain
2nd place, silver medalist(s)		Finlay Graham	Great Britain
3rd place, bronze medalist(s)		David Nicholas	Australia

The men's individual pursuit class C3 track cycling event at the 2020 Summer Paralympics took place on 26 August 2021 at the Izu Velodrome, Japan. This class is for cyclists who have impairments that affect their legs, arms, and/or trunk but are still capable to use a standard bicycle. 8 cyclists from 7 nations competed in this event.

== Competition format ==
The competition starts with a qualifying round where the 8 cyclists are divided into 4 heats, each heat containing 2 cyclists; they will then compete on a time trial basis. The 2 fastest in the qualifying round would qualify to the gold medal final while the 3rd and 4th fastest will qualify to the bronze medal final. The distance of this event is 3000m. The event finals are held on the same day as the qualifying.

== Schedule ==
All times are Japan Standard Time (UTC+9)

Date	Time	Round
Thursday, 26 August	12:04	Qualifying
Thursday, 26 August	15:52	Finals

== Records ==
World Record	Alexey Obydennov (RUS)	3:26.691	Aguascalientes, Mexico	11 April 2014
Paralympic Record	David Nicholas (AUS)	3:32.336	Rio de Janeiro, Brazil	9 September 2016

== Results ==
=== Qualifying ===
Rank	Heat	Nation	Cyclists	Result	Notes
1	3	Great Britain	Jaco van Gass	3:17.593	QG, WR
2	2	Great Britain	Finlay Graham	3:19.780	QG
3	4	Australia	David Nicholas	3:23.674	QB
4	4	Spain	Eduardo Santas Asensio	3:27.682	QB
5	3	Belgium	Diederick Schelfhout	3:30.284	
6	1	Colombia	Alejandro Perea Arango	3:31.551	
7	2	United States	Joseph Berenyi	3:35.652	
8	1	Japan	Masaki Fujita	3:38.366	

=== Finals ===
Rank	Nation	Cyclists	Result	Notes
Gold medal final
1st place, gold medalist(s)	Great Britain	Jaco van Gass	3:20.987	
2nd place, silver medalist(s)	Great Britain	Finlay Graham	3:22.000	
Bronze medal final
3rd place, bronze medalist(s)	Australia	David Nicholas	3:25.877	
4	Spain	Eduardo Santas Asensio	3:27.833	
