= Denise Schindler =

German Paralympic cyclist (born 1985)

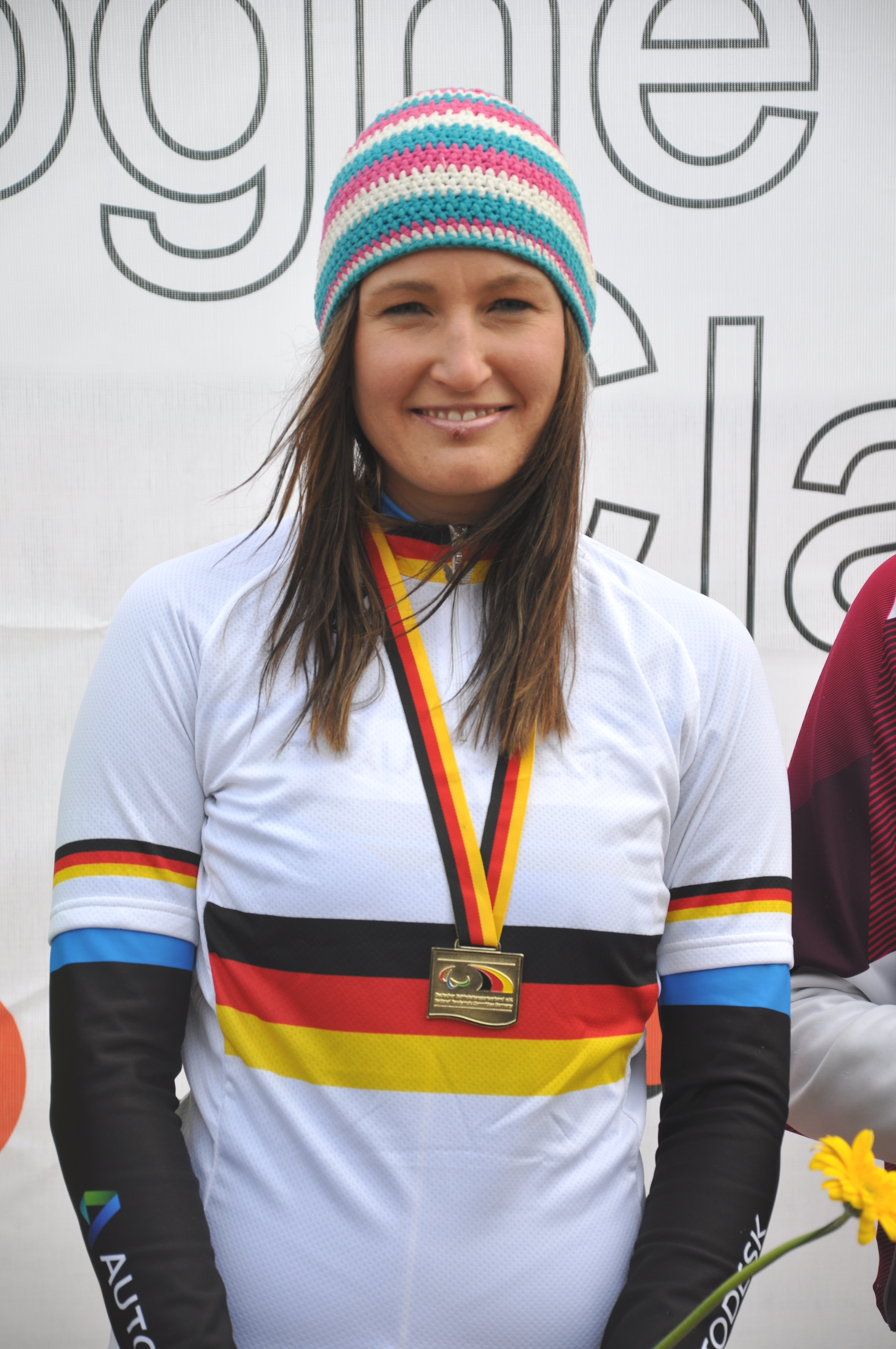
- Schindler in 2016

Personal information
- Nationality: German
- Born: 9 November 1985 (age 40) Chemnitz, Germany

Sport
- Country: Germany
- Sport: Cycling
Medal record
Paralympic Games
Silver medal – second place	2016 Rio de Janeiro	Road time trial C1–3
Silver medal – second place	2012 London	Road race C1–3
Bronze medal – third place	2016 Rio de Janeiro	Road race C1–3
Bronze medal – third place	2020 Tokyo	Pursuit C1–3
Track World Championships
Bronze medal – third place	2020 Milton	Individual pursuit C3
Bronze medal – third place	2020 Milton	Omnium C3

Denise Schindler (born 9 November 1985) is a German Paralympic cyclist.

== Life and career ==
Schindler got into a tram accident when she was three years old, resulting in her right leg being amputated below the knee. She began cycling when she was 18.

She participated at the Paralympic Games in 2012, where she won a silver medal in the women's road race C1–3 event, and in 2016, where she won a silver medal in the women's road time trial C1–3 event and a bronze medal in the women's road race C1–3 event.

Schindler worked with software company Autodesk to develop of a new process for making prosthetics for amputees which could be measured digitally and made using 3D printing. The resulting prosthetic was lighter, cheaper and could take five days to make rather than 10 weeks. She used it at the 2016 Paralympic Games.

In 2021, Schindler was elected to represent Paralympic cyclists in the UCI Athletes’ Commission alongside Colin Lynch.
