= Zhou Jufang =

Chinese Paralympic cyclist

Personal information
- Nationality: Chinese
- Born: 19 December 1985 (age 40) Shanghai, China

Sport
- Sport: Cycling
Medal record
Representing China
Women's Paralympic cycling
Summer Paralympics
Gold medal – first place	2004 Athens	1km time trial LC1-4/CP 3/4
Silver medal – second place	2016 Rio de Janeiro	500 m time trial C4–5
Bronze medal – third place	2008 Beijing	Individual time trial LC1-2/CP4
World Track Championships
Gold medal – first place	2007 Bordeaux	500m time trial LC1
Silver medal – second place	2018 Rio de Janeiro	Time trial C5

Zhou Jufang (born 19 December 1985) is a Chinese cyclist. She won the silver medal at the Women's C4–5 500 meter time trial event at the 2016 Summer Paralympics with a world record of 36.004.
