= Cycling at the 2024 Summer Paralympics – Men's pursuit C3 =

Men's individual pursuit C3 at the XVII Paralympic Games
- Venue: Vélodrome National
- Dates: 30 August 2024
- Competitors: 7 from 6 nations
- Winning time: 3:18.460

Medalists
1st place, gold medalist(s)		Jaco van Gass	Great Britain
2nd place, silver medalist(s)		Finlay Graham	Great Britain
3rd place, bronze medalist(s)		Alexandre Hayward	Canada

The men's individual pursuit class C3 track cycling event at the 2024 Summer Paralympics took place on 30 August 2024 at the Vélodrome National.

== Competition format ==
The C category is for cyclists with a physical impairment (muscle power or range of motion, and impairments affecting the coordination) that prevents them from competing in able-bodied competition but still competes using a standard bicycle.

The competition starts with a qualifying round where it comprises a head-to-head race between the 8 cyclists; The 2 fastest cyclists in the qualifying would qualify to the gold medal final while the 3rd and 4th fastest will qualify to the bronze medal final where they will race head-to-head. The distance of this event is 3000 metres. The medal finals are also held on the same day as the qualifying.

== Schedule ==
All times are Central European Summer Time (UTC+2)

Date	Time	Round
30 August	13:27	Qualifying
30 August	16:18	Finals

== Results ==
=== Qualifying ===
Rank	Heat	Cyclist	Nation	Result	Notes
1	4	Jaco van Gass	Great Britain	3:15.488	QG, WR
2	3	Finlay Graham	Great Britain	3:17.305	QG
3	3	Eduardo Santas	Spain	3:25.874	QB
4	2	Alexandre Hayward	Canada	3:26.940	QB
5	4	Devon Briggs	New Zealand	3:27.017	
6	2	Thomas Peyroton-Dartet	France	3:28.192	
7	1	Muhammad Adi Raimie Amizazahan	Malaysia	3:47.922	

=== Finals ===
Rank	Cyclist	Nation	Result	Notes
Gold medal final
1st place, gold medalist(s)	Jaco van Gass	Great Britain	3:18.460	
2nd place, silver medalist(s)	Finlay Graham	Great Britain	3:22.540	
Bronze medal final
3rd place, bronze medalist(s)	Alexandre Hayward	Canada	3:24.865	
4	Eduardo Santas	Spain	3:28.617	
