= Aaron Keith =

American cyclist (born 1971)

Personal information
- Born: June 23, 1971 (age 55) Woodinville, Washington, U.S.

Sport
- Sport: Para-cycling
- Disability class: C1
Medal record
Men's Para-cycling
Representing United States
Paralympic Games
Silver medal – second place	2020 Tokyo	Road time trial C1
Road World Championships
Silver medal – second place	2022 Baie-Comeau	Time trial C1
Bronze medal – third place	2023 Glasgow	Time trial C1
Track World Championships
Silver medal – second place	2022 Saint-Quentin-en-Yvelines	Scratch race C1
Silver medal – second place	2022 Saint-Quentin-en-Yvelines	Individual pursuit C1
Bronze medal – third place	2023 Glasgow	Scratch race C1
Bronze medal – third place	2024 Rio de Janeiro	Individual pursuit C1

Aaron Keith (born June 23, 1971) is an American Para-cyclist who represented the United States at the 2020 Summer Paralympics.

== Career ==
Keith represented the United States in the men's road time trial C1 event at the 2020 Summer Paralympics and won a silver medal.

Keith represented the United States at the 2022 UCI Para-cycling Track World Championships where he won a silver medal in the scratch race and individual pursuit events.

In August 2024, Keith was issued with a 14-month ban set to expire in June 2026 for an anti-doping rule violation relating to a positive test for anabolic steroids in January 2024. An earlier shorter ban for four months was superseded by a settlement agreement that Keith agreed with the Court of Arbitration for Sport.
