= Cycling at the 2020 Summer Paralympics – Women's time trial C4–5 =

Women's time trial C4-5 at the XVI Paralympic Games
- Venue: Izu Velodrome
- Dates: 27 August 2021
- Competitors: 11 from 10 nations

Medalists
| 1st place, gold medalist(s) | | Kadeena Cox | Great Britain |
| 2nd place, silver medalist(s) | | Kate O'Brien | Canada |
| 3rd place, bronze medalist(s) | | Caroline Groot | Netherlands |

The women's time trial class C4-5 track cycling event at the 2020 Summer Paralympics took place on 27 August 2021 at the Izu Velodrome, Japan. This combined class of (C4-5) under classification C is for cyclists who have impairments that affect their legs, arms, and/or trunk but are still capable to use a standard bicycle. 11 cyclists from 10 nations competed in this event.

== Competition format ==
The competition immediately begins with the finals, where the 11 cyclists will individually in their own heat, compete by doing a time trial basis where the fastest cyclist will win gold, the 2nd fastest a silver, and the 3rd fastest a bronze. The distance of this event is 500m. Cyclists may have a different official time than their real-time due to this event being a combined class event (C1-3), and some cyclists in their own class may have a disadvantage over other classes (for example due to speed), thus athlete factor was used where those in C4 HAS 98.91 and C5 100.00. The time cyclist from class C5 gets will be their official time while those in C4 will have it lesser due to the factor.

== Schedule ==
All times are Japan Standard Time (UTC+9)

| Date | Time | Round |
|---|---|---|
| Friday, 27 August | 14:29 | Finals |

== Records ==
Women's C4 500m Time Trial

| World record | Kate O'Brien (CAN) | 35.223 | Milton, Canada | 31 January 2020 |
| Paralympic record | Kadeena Cox (GBR) | 35.716 | Rio De Janeiro, Brazil | 10 September 2016 |

Women's C5 500m Time Trial

| World record | Zhou Jufangs (CHN) | 36.004 | Rio de Janeiro, Brazil | 10 September 2016 |
| Paralympic record | Zhou Jufangs (CHN) | 36.004 | Rio de Janeiro, Brazil | 10 September 2016 |

== Results ==
| Rank | Heat | Nation | Cyclists | Class | Real time | Factored time | Notes |
|---|---|---|---|---|---|---|---|
| 1st place, gold medalist(s) | 11 | Great Britain | Kadeena Cox | C4 | 34.812 | 34.433 | WR |
| 2nd place, silver medalist(s) | 10 | Canada | Kate O'Brien | C4 | 35.830 | 35.439 | |
| 3rd place, bronze medalist(s) | 9 | Netherlands | Caroline Groot | C5 | 35.599 | 35.599 | WR |
| 4 | 8 | France | Marie Patouillet | C5 | 36.683 | 36.683 | |
| 5 | 5 | China | Ruan Jianping | C4 | 37.834 | 37.422 | |
| 6 | 6 | New Zealand | Nicole Murray | C5 | 37.657 | 37.657 | |
| 7 | 7 | RPC | Alina Punina | C5 | 38.369 | 38.369 | |
| 8 | 3 | New Zealand | Anna Taylor | C4 | 39.140 | 38.713 | |
| 9 | 4 | Argentina | Mariela Delgado | C5 | 38.892 | 38.892 | |
| 10 | 1 | Colombia | Paula Ossa | C5 | 39.868 | 39.868 | |
| 11 | 2 | Brazil | Ana Raquel Montenegro Batsita Lins | C5 | 44.157 | 44.157 | |
