= Tara Neyland =

Australian para-cyclist (born 1994)

- Tary Neyland (2026)

Personal information
- Nationality: Australian
- Born: 28 January 1994 (age 32)

Sport
- Sport: Para-cycling
- Disability: Facioscapulohumeral muscular dystrophy
- Disability class: C4
Medal record
Women's para-cycling
Representing Australia
Event	1st	2nd	3rd
Road World Championships	2	1	0
Track World Championships	5	2	0
Commonwealth Games	2	0	0
Total	9	3	0
Road World Championships
Gold medal – first place	2025 Ronse	Time trial C4
Gold medal – first place	2025 Ronse	Road race C4
Silver medal – second place	2026 Huntsville	Time trial C4
Track World Championships
Gold medal – first place	2025 Rio de Janeiro	Elimination C4
Gold medal – first place	2025 Rio de Janeiro	Time trial C4
Gold medal – first place	2025 Rio de Janeiro	Scratch C4
Gold medal – first place	2026 Apeldoorn	Scratch C4
Gold medal – first place	2026 Apeldoorn	Elimination C4
Silver medal – second place	2026 Apeldoorn	Time trial C4
Silver medal – second place	2026 Apeldoorn	Sprint C4
Commonwealth Games
Gold medal – first place	2026 Glasgow	Individual pursuit C4-5
Gold medal – first place	2026 Glasgow	1 km time trial C4-5

Tara Neyland (born 28 January 1994) is an Australian para-cyclist. She is a two-time Road World Champion and five-time Track World Champion.

== Career ==
On 3 July 2025, Neyland was selected to represent Australia at the 2025 UCI Para-cycling Road World Championships. She won a gold medal in the time trial C4 event with a time of 33:51.60. She also won a gold medal in the road race C4 event with a time of 2:08:38. In October 2025, she represented Australia at the 2025 UCI Para-cycling Track World Championships and won gold medals in the elimination C4, 1 km time trial C4, and scratch race C4 events.

In August 2026, she competed at the 2026 Commonwealth Games and won gold medals in the individual pursuit C4-5 and 1 km time trial C4-5 events. During the individual pursuit she set a Commonwealth Games and World record time of 4:49.648. During the 1 km time trial she set a Commonwealth Games and World record time of 1:09.667.

== Personal life ==
In 2023, Neyland was diagnosed with facioscapulohumeral muscular dystrophy, a progressive neuromuscular condition that causes muscle weakness and loss. She works as an osteopath.

== Recognition ==
In 2026, awarded with Hannah Macdougall the Elite Sportsperson of the Year at the Victorian Disability Sport & Recreation Awards.
