= Ruan Jianping =

Chinese Paralympic cyclist

Personal information
- Nationality: Chinese

Sport
- Sport: Cycling
Medal record
Representing China
Women's Paralympic cycling
Summer Paralympics
Bronze medal – third place	2016 Rio de Janeiro	Women's C4–5 500 meter time trial
Track World Championships
Silver medal – second place	2020 Milton	Scratch race C4
Bronze medal – third place	2020 Milton	Omnium C4
Bronze medal – third place	2020 Milton	500 m time trial C4
Asian Para Games
Silver medal – second place	2018 Jakarta	Women's C2–5 Track Cycling Pursuit

Ruan Jianping is a Chinese cyclist. She won the bronze medal at the Women's C4–5 500 meter time trial event at the 2016 Summer Paralympics with 36.557.
