= Jamie Whitmore =

American triathlete and para-cyclist (born 1976)

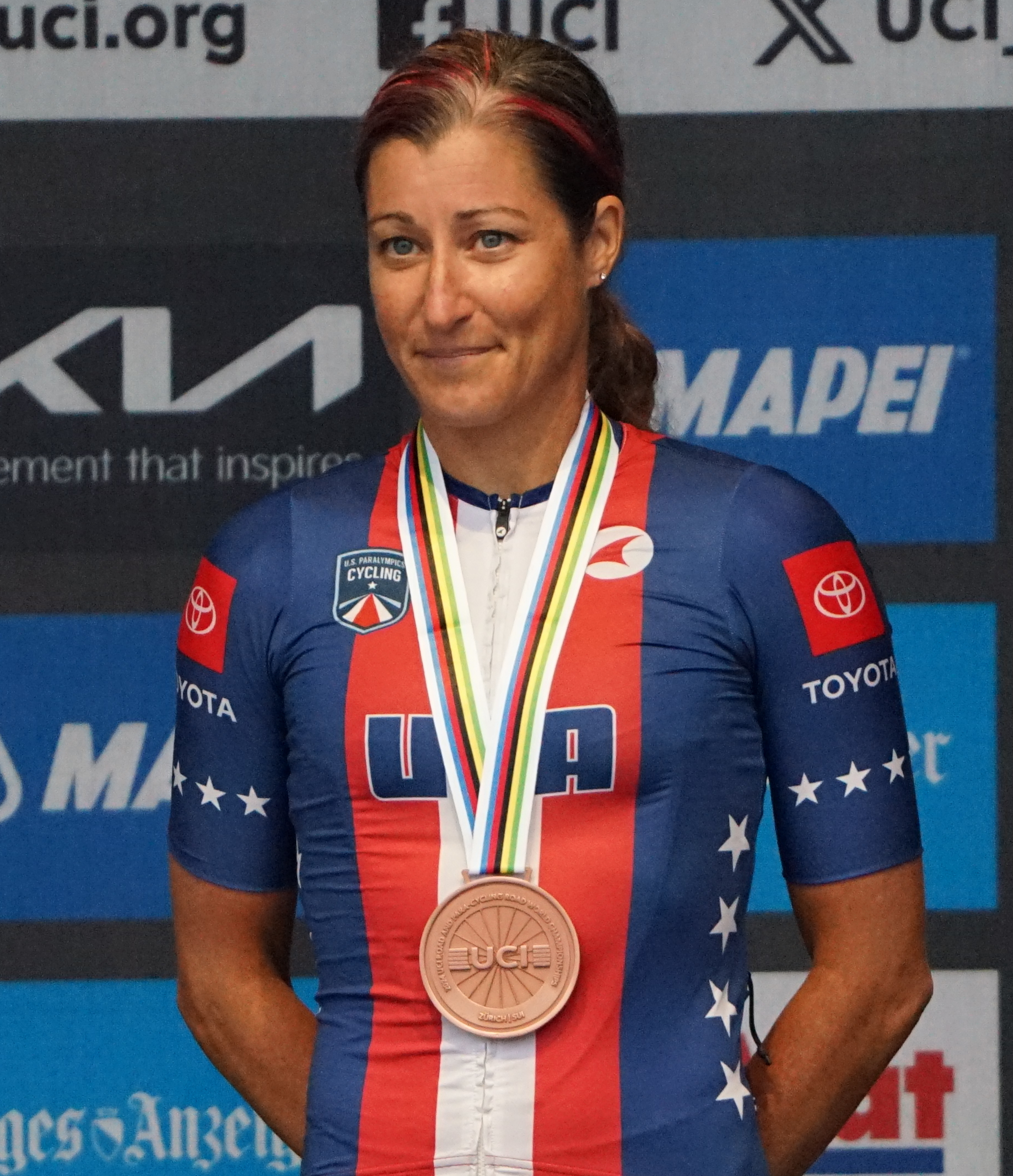
- Whitmore at the 2024 World Championships

Personal information
- Full name: Jamie Whitmore
- Born: May 4, 1976 (age 50) Sacramento, California
- Height: 5 ft (1.5 m)
- Weight: 112 lb (51 kg)

Cycling career
- Sport: Cycling
- Role: Rider
Medal record
Para-cycling
Representing United States
Paralympic Games
Gold medal – first place	2016 Rio	Road race C1–3
Silver medal – second place	2016 Rio	Individual pursuit C1–3
Road World Championships
Gold medal – first place	2013 Baie-Comeau	Time trial C3
Gold medal – first place	2013 Baie-Comeau	Road race C3
Gold medal – first place	2014 Greenville	Time trial C3
Gold medal – first place	2014 Greenville	Road race C3
Gold medal – first place	2015 Nottwil	Time trial C3
Gold medal – first place	2015 Nottwil	Road race C3
Silver medal – second place	2024 Zurich	Time trial C3
Silver medal – second place	2025 Ronse	Road race C3
Bronze medal – third place	2018 Maniago	Time trial C3
Bronze medal – third place	2018 Maniago	Road race C3
Bronze medal – third place	2022 Baie-Comeau	Time trial C3
Bronze medal – third place	2024 Zurich	Road race C3
Track World Championships
Gold medal – first place	2014 Aguascalientes	Time Trial C3
Gold medal – first place	2014 Aguascalientes	Pursuit C3
Gold medal – first place	2015 Apeldoorn	Time Trial C3
Gold medal – first place	2017 Los Angeles	Time Trial C3
Gold medal – first place	2017 Los Angeles	Scratch C3
Silver medal – second place	2015 Apeldoorn	Pursuit C3
Silver medal – second place	2015 Apeldoorn	Scratch C3
Silver medal – second place	2016 Montichiari	Scratch C3
Bronze medal – third place	2016 Montichiari	Time Trial C3
Bronze medal – third place	2018 Rio de Janeiro	Time Trial C3
Bronze medal – third place	2018 Rio de Janeiro	Pursuit C3
Bronze medal – third place	2018 Rio de Janeiro	Scratch C3

Jamie Whitmore Cardenas (born 4 May 1976) is a former American triathlete turned para-cyclist. Whitmore began her sports career competing in the XTERRA Triathlon throughout the 2000s. As a XTERRA triathlete, she won over thirty events and was the XTERRA world champion in 2004. After being diagnosed with spindle cell sarcoma in 2008, Whitmore moved to para-cycling in the 2010s and competed in championships held by the Union Cycliste Internationale.

Since 2013, Whitmore has won twenty overall medals while competing at the UCI Para-cycling Road World Championships and UCI Para-cycling Track World Championships. After breaking the C3 world record in time trial and pursuit at the 2014 para-cycling track championships, Whitmore won gold in the road race and pursuit events at the 2016 Summer Paralympics. Apart from her medals, Whitmore was inducted into the XTERRA Hall of Fame in 2012 and was the winner of the Best Female Athlete with a Disability ESPY Award in 2014.

== Early life and education ==
Whitmore was born on 4 May 1976 in Sacramento, California. During her childhood, Whitmore played in various sports before she started track and field in middle school. As an athlete, Whitmore went to California State University, Northridge on a scholarship and completed a criminology degree in 1998.

== Career ==
=== Triathlon and road para-cycling ===
After university, Whitmore competed in mountain bike races before settling on triathlon in the early 2000s. As a competitor for XTERRA Triathlon, Whitmore was the world champion in 2004 and won over thirty races including consecutive United States championships from 2002 to 2007 excluding 2006. In 2008, Whitmore was diagnosed with spindle cell sarcoma and became paralyzed in her leg due to drop foot. After her paralysis ended her triathlon career, Whitmore returned to cycling in the 2010s.

As a paracyclist, Whitmore began competing in championships held by the Union Cycliste Internationale in 2013. At the UCI Para-cycling Road World Championships, Whitmore won back to back gold medals at the time trial and road race events from 2013 to 2015. She later won bronze in both events during the 2018 event. During the 2022 edition, Whitmore won bronze in the road race.

=== Track para-cycling ===
Simultaneously, Whitmore started competing at the UCI Para-cycling Track World Championships in 2014. At the 2014 event, Whitmore broke the world records in the time trial and pursuit events for the C3 classification while winning her first track gold medals in those events. The following year, Whitmore reclaimed her gold in time trial while adding a silver in pursuit and scratch race. She added a silver in scratch race and bronze in time trial at the 2016 track championship.

Whitmore added a gold in time trial and scratch in 2017 with additional bronzes in time trial, pursuit and scratch in 2018. In international events, Whitmore competed at her first Paralympics during the 2016 Summer Paralympics. As a C1-3 competitor, she won gold in the road race and silver in the 3000 meters individual pursuit. At the 2020 Summer Paralympics, Whitmore did not any medals in her events.

== Awards and honors ==
Whitmore was inducted into the XTERRA Hall of Fame in 2012 and won the Best Female Athlete with a Disability ESPY Award in 2014.

Jamie is a single mother of twin boys.
