= Jaco van Gass =

British paracyclist

Jaco van Gass OBE
Personal information
- Born: 20 August 1986 (age 40) Middelburg, South Africa

Cycling career
- Sport: Cycling
- Discipline: Track
Medal record
Men's para cycling
Representing Great Britain
Summer Paralympics
Gold medal – first place	2020 Tokyo	Individual pursuit C3
Gold medal – first place	2020 Tokyo	Mixed team sprint C1–5
Gold medal – first place	2024 Paris	Individual pursuit C3
Gold medal – first place	2024 Paris	Mixed team sprint C1–5
Bronze medal – third place	2020 Tokyo	Time trial C1–3
Track World Championships
Gold medal – first place	2020 Milton	1K time trial C3
Gold medal – first place	2020 Milton	Scratch race
Gold medal – first place	2020 Milton	Omnium
Gold medal – first place	2022 Saint-Quentin-en-Yvelines	1K time trial C3
Gold medal – first place	2023 Glasgow	1K time trial C3
Gold medal – first place	2023 Glasgow	Scratch race C3
Gold medal – first place	2023 Glasgow	Omnium C3
Gold medal – first place	2024 Rio de Janeiro	Omnium C3
Silver medal – second place	2020 Milton	3K pursuit
Silver medal – second place	2019 Emmen	Road Race C3
Silver medal – second place	2023 Glasgow	Individual pursuit C3
Silver medal – second place	2023 Glasgow	Mixed team sprint C1–5
Silver medal – second place	2024 Rio de Janeiro	1K time trial C3
Bronze medal – third place	2018 Rio de Janeiro	Individual pursuit C4

Jaco-Albert van Gass (born 20 August 1986) is a South African-born British racing cyclist who competes in para-cycling track events. He won two gold medals and one bronze medal at the Tokyo 2020 Paralympic Games. He is a three times world record holder in Track cycling.

== Deployment in Afghanistan ==
Van Gass was born in South Africa. At the age of 20, he moved to the UK to join the British Armed Forces. In mid-2007, he finished his training and became a member of the Parachute Regiment. During his second deployment to Afghanistan in 2009, he was hit by a rocket-propelled grenade, losing his lower left arm, puncturing internal organs, and suffering a collapsed lung, shrapnel and blast wounds, and leg fractures.

== Athletic career ==
Van Gass first learned to ski and took part in competitions as a member of the Combined Services Disabled Ski Team. In 2011, he was the first South African-born person to conquer the eighth highest mountain in the world at 8,164 metres, the Manaslu in the Himalayas. In 2012, he made an attempt to climb Mount Everest, which failed due to poor weather conditions. In the meantime, he has also successfully completed marathons.

In December 2013, van Gass was part of a group of disabled soldiers who, together with Prince Harry, completed a 335-kilometre march to the South Pole for the benefit of the aid organization Walking With The Wounded. This raised £1.5 million in donations that were to be used for the athletic rehabilitation of wounded soldiers.

Van Gass then turned his interest to cycling and was accepted into the Paralympic Development Program in 2013. At the Invictus Games in September 2014, he won two gold medals in cycling. Since the end of 2014, he has been participating in the Paralympic Academy Program of British Cycling.

Van Gass made his debut at the 2015 UCI Para-cycling Track World Championships and finished seventh in the individual pursuit and eighth in the 1,000 metre time trial. At the 2016 UCI Para-cycling Track World Championships in Montichiari, Italy, he won the bronze medal in the scratch race. Two years later, at the 2018 UCI Para-cycling Track World Championships in Rio de Janeiro, he finished third in the individual pursuit. In 2020, he won a silver medal in the pursuit and gold medals in the kilo, scratch race and omnium.

At the 2020 Summer Paralympics, Van Gass won the gold medal in the men's individual pursuit C3, mixed team sprint C1–5 and the bronze medal in the men's time trial C1–3.

Van Gass was appointed a Member of the Order of the British Empire (MBE) in the 2022 New Year Honours for services to cycling.

At the 2024 Summer Paralympics, Van Gass won a gold medal in the C3 3000m just days after being hit by a car. He also came 4th in the C3 1000m. In the road events he came 6th in the road race and 8th in the time trial.

Van Gass was appointed Officer of the Order of the British Empire (OBE) in the 2025 New Year Honours for services to cycling.
