= Song Zhenling =

Chinese Paralympic cyclist

Personal information
- Nationality: Chinese

Sport
- Sport: Cycling
Medal record
Representing China
Women's Paralympic cycling
Summer Paralympics
Bronze medal – third place	2016 Rio de Janeiro	500 meter time trial C1–3
Track World Championships
Silver medal – second place	2023 Glasgow	500 m time trial C2
Asian Para Games
Silver medal – second place	2022 Hangzhou	500 m time trial C1–3

Song Zhenling is a Chinese cyclist. She won the bronze medal at the Women's C1–3 500 meter time trial event at the 2016 Summer Paralympics with 40.020.
