= Caroline Groot =

Dutch Paralympic cyclist (born 1997)

Personal information
- Nationality: Dutch
- Born: 4 September 1997 (age 29) Andijk, Netherlands

Sport
- Sport: Paralympic athletics
- Disability class: C5
- Event: cycling
Medal record
Women's para-cycling
Representing Netherlands
Paralympic Games
Gold medal – first place	2024 Paris	C4-5 time trial
Bronze medal – third place	2020 Tokyo	C4-5 time trial
Track World Championships
Gold medal – first place	2018 Rio de Janeiro	Scratch race C4-5
Gold medal – first place	2019 Apeldoorn	500m time trial
Gold medal – first place	2020 Milton	500m time trial
Gold medal – first place	2022 Saint-Quentin-en-Yvelines	500m time trial
Gold medal – first place	2023 Glasgow	500m time trial C5
Gold medal – first place	2024 Rio de Janeiro	500m time trial C5

Caroline Groot (born 4 September 1997) is a Dutch Paralympic cyclist who competes in C5 classification. She made her first Paralympic appearance during the 2020 Summer Paralympics.

== Career ==
Caroline claimed gold medal in C5 scratch race at the 2018 UCI Para-cycling Track World Championships.

She pulled off an upset at the 2019 UCI Para-cycling Track World Championships where she beat much fancied British veteran cyclist Sarah Storey to claim gold medal in the women's 500m time trial event. She retained her title in the 500m time trial C5 event at the 2020 UCI Para-cycling Track World Championships with a timing of 36.159.

She represented Netherlands at the 2020 Summer Paralympics and competed in women's C4-5 where she claimed a bronze medal. She also set a new world record in women's C5 500m time trial with a record timing of 35.599 to she win the bronze medal.

She competed at the 2024 Paris Paralympics and she beat the home favourite, Marie Patouillet, in the women's C4-5 500m time trial final. The Tokyo silver medallist Kate O’Brien came third.
