= Montichiari =

Montichiari Munticiàr
- Comune
- Città di Montichiari
- Coat of arms

- Location within Italy Location within Lombardy
- Coordinates: 45°25′N 10°24′E
- Country: Italy
- Region: Lombardy
- Province: Brescia (BS)
- Frazioni: Vighizzolo, Novagli, Chiarini, Ro, Sant'Antonio

Government
  - Mayor: Marco Togni

Area
  - Total: 81 km^{2} (31 sq mi)
- Elevation: 108 m (354 ft)

Population (2011)
  - Total: 26,140
  - Density: 320/km^{2} (840/sq mi)
- Demonym: Monteclarensi
- Time zone: UTC+1 (CET)
  - Summer (DST): UTC+2 (CEST)
- Postal code: 25018
- Dialing code: 030
- Patron saint: San Pancrazio
- Saint day: May 12
- Website: Official website

Montichiari (Brescian: Munticiàr) is a town and comune in the province of Brescia, in Lombardy. It received the honorary title of city with a presidential decree on December 27, 1991. The town is home to the Gabriele D'Annunzio airport (Italian: Aeroporto Gabriele D'Annunzio), the fair center Centro Fiera del Garda and the Bonoris castle (Italian: Castello Bonoris).

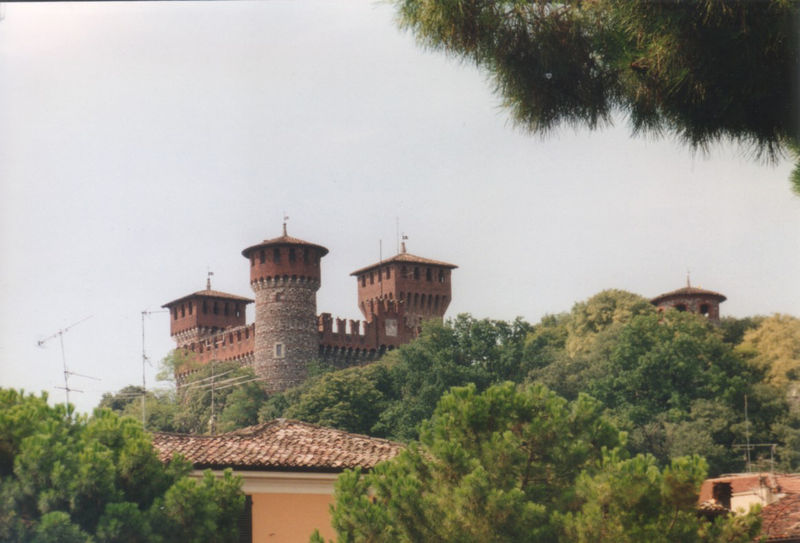
The Bonoris castle in Montichiari.

Giovanni Treccani, publisher of the eponymous encyclopedia, was born in Montichiari.

== Twin towns ==
Montichiari is twinned with:

- Gambettola, Italy
- Pescara, Italy
