= Alyda Norbruis =

Dutch Paralympic cyclist

Personal information
- Born: 28 March 1989 (age 37) Ureterp, Netherlands

Cycling career
- Sport: Cycling
- Role: Rider
Medal record
Para-cycling
Representing Netherlands
Paralympic Games
| Gold medal – first place | 2016 Rio de Janeiro | Road time trial C1–3 |
| Gold medal – first place | 2016 Rio de Janeiro | 500m track time trial C1–3 |
| Silver medal – second place | 2012 London | 500m track time trial C1–3 |
| Silver medal – second place | 2020 Tokyo | 500m track time trial C1–3 |
| Bronze medal – third place | 2016 Rio de Janeiro | Individual pursuit C1-3 |

Alyda Norbruis (born 28 March 1989, Ureterp) is a Dutch/Frisian Paralympic cyclist. She won medals at the 2012 Summer Paralympics and the 2016 Summer Paralympics. She competed at the 2020 Summer Paralympics, in Women's time trial C1–3, winning a silver medal.

She competed at the 2012 Track Cycling World Championships.
