= Megan Giglia =

British cyclist (born 1985)

Megan Giglia MBE
Personal information
- Nationality: British
- Born: 26 March 1985 (age 41) Kent, England
- Website: www.megangiglia.com

Sport
- Country: Great Britain
- Sport: Track & Road Cycling
- Club: Para-T and Congleton Cycling Club
Medal record
Representing Great Britain
Women's Para-cycling
Summer Paralympics
Gold medal – first place	2016 Rio de Janeiro	Ind. Pursuit (C3)
Track World Championships
Gold medal – first place	2016 Montichiari	Time trial (C3)
Gold medal – first place	2016 Montichiari	Pursuit (C3)

Megan Giglia (born 26 March 1985) is a British Paralympic track cyclist competing in C3 classification events. Giglia came to note as a cyclist during the 2016 UCI Para-cycling Track World Championships where she won gold medals in the Individual Pursuit and Time Trial events becoming double world champion and setting new world records in both.

== Personal history ==
Giglia was born in 1985 in Kent, England and spent her early life in Stratford-upon-Avon before moving to Manchester. In 2013 Giglia worked as a multi-sport coach, specialising in teaching rugby and gymnastics. After suffering from several fainting spells at work she sought medical advice that revealed blood in her spinal fluid. Further tests showed a bleed on her brain which required surgery. Initially attempts were made to insert fine coils into her brain, but when this failed she underwent a craniotomy. She awoke from the surgery after a two-week induced coma with the loss of function the right side of her body, reduced speech and memory loss. A month after her operation Giglia was admitted to an intensive rehab facility. Although feeling positive at the unit, Giglia discovered the extent of her disability on returning home, as she found simple everyday tasks difficult to complete independently. A few months later she was diagnosed with epilepsy, she and her partner split up and Giglia fell into a depression. She left her home and spent three weeks sleeping on her friends couch, before a talk with her friend's mother, who had terminal cancer, placed her life into perspective. In a 2015 interview, Giglia stated that "She made me rethink things. I had to do something for me. She gave me back that focus. She told me she wanted me to find a sport and be the best I can be."

== Cycling career ==
After deciding to turn her life around, Giglia researched several sports to join and attended a para-cycling selection camp for women. A year on from her stroke she was classified as a C3 athlete and was accepted on to the British Cycling Paralympic Development Programme. Over the next six months she progressed through the Great Britain talent scheme until she progressed to the Academy in October 2014.

Giglia was selected for the Great Britain team at the 2015 UCI Para-cycling Track World Championships in Apeldoorn. She finished just outside the medal positions in both the C3 500m time-trial (4th) and the C3 individual pursuit (4th). She was then selected for the 2015 UCI Para-cycling Road World Championships in Nottwil in Switzerland; but again failed to medal with two fourth places in the time trial and the road race. The year ended with a major break-through for Giglia when she beat the reigning world champion, Denise Schindler, in the C3 individual pursuit.

In 2016, in the buildup to the Summer Paralympics in Rio, Giglia entered her second World Championships. There, at Montichiari in Italy, she won gold in both the C3 500m time-trial and the individual pursuit setting new world records in both events.

On the first day of the 2016 Rio Paralympics, Giglia won the women's 3000 m individual pursuit (C3), Great Britain's first medal of the Games.

Giglia was appointed Member of the Order of the British Empire (MBE) in the 2017 New Year Honours for services to cycling.
