= Vélodrome National =

French arena for track cycling

National Velodrome of Saint-Quentin-en-Yvelines
- Vélodrome de Saint-Quentin-en-Yvelines
- Interactive map of National Velodrome of Saint-Quentin-en-Yvelines
- Location: 1 Rue Laurent Fignon; Montigny-le-Bretonneux, France
- Coordinates: 48°47′16″N 02°02′05″E
- Capacity: 5,000
- Surface: Wood
- Field size: 250 m (270 yd) track

Construction
- Groundbreaking: 2011
- Built: 2011–2014
- Opened: 13 January 2014
- Architect: Chabanne et partenaires

The Vélodrome National de Saint-Quentin-en-Yvelines is a velodrome in Montigny-le-Bretonneux, France. It was built between 2011 and 2014 and hosted the 2015, 2022 UCI Track Cycling World Championships, and the 2016 UEC European Track Championships. It hosted the cycling venue in the 2024 Summer Olympics. The track is 250 m long and 8 m wide, a metre wider than most other tracks.

The velodrome is 36km from the Olympic Village, and is close to other 2024 Summer Olympics venues: Saint-Quentin-en-Yvelines BMX Stadium, Golf National, Colline d'Élancourt (mountain biking), and the Palace of Versailles.

== See also ==
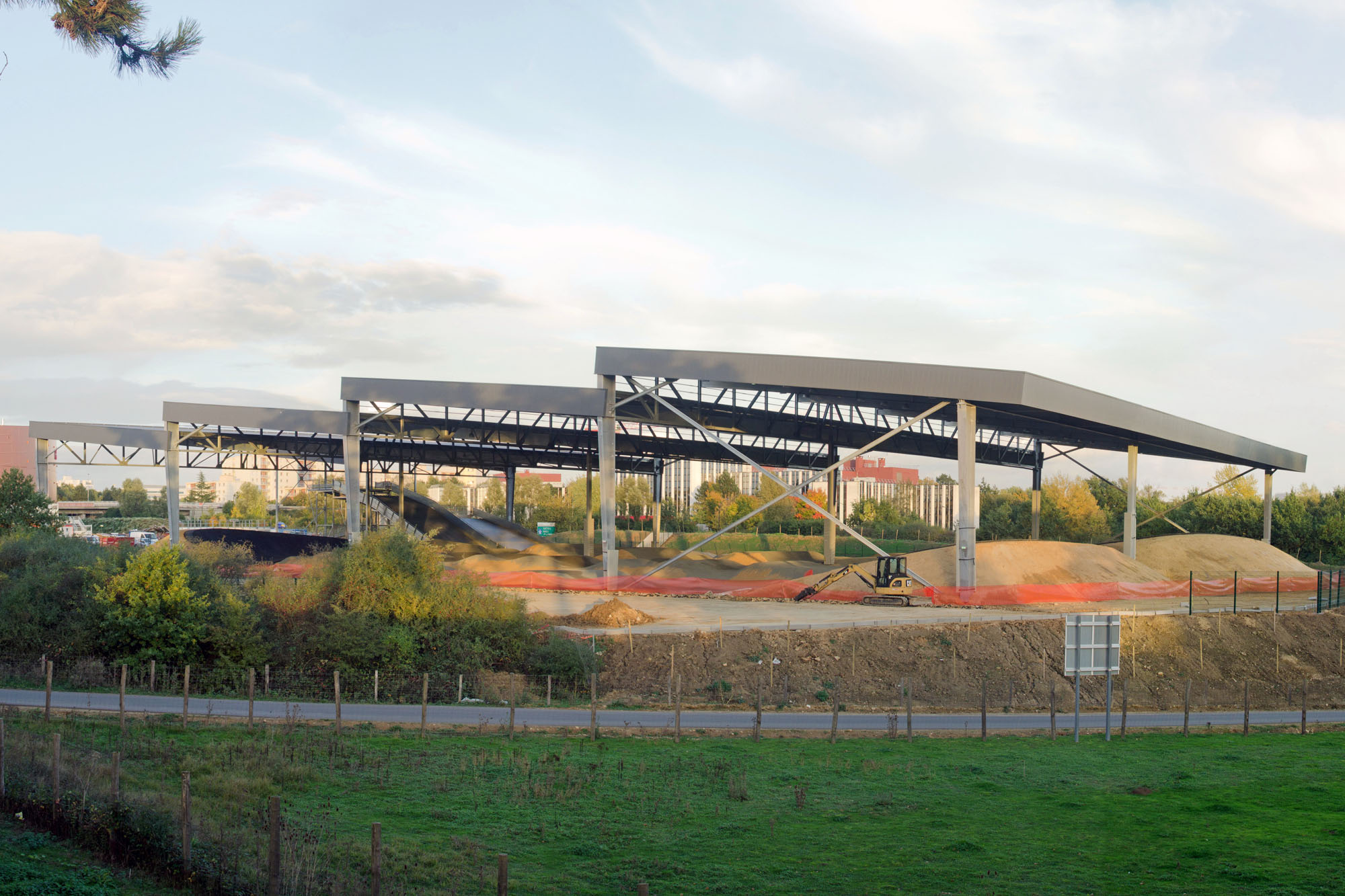
BMX National de Saint-Quentin-en-Yvelines

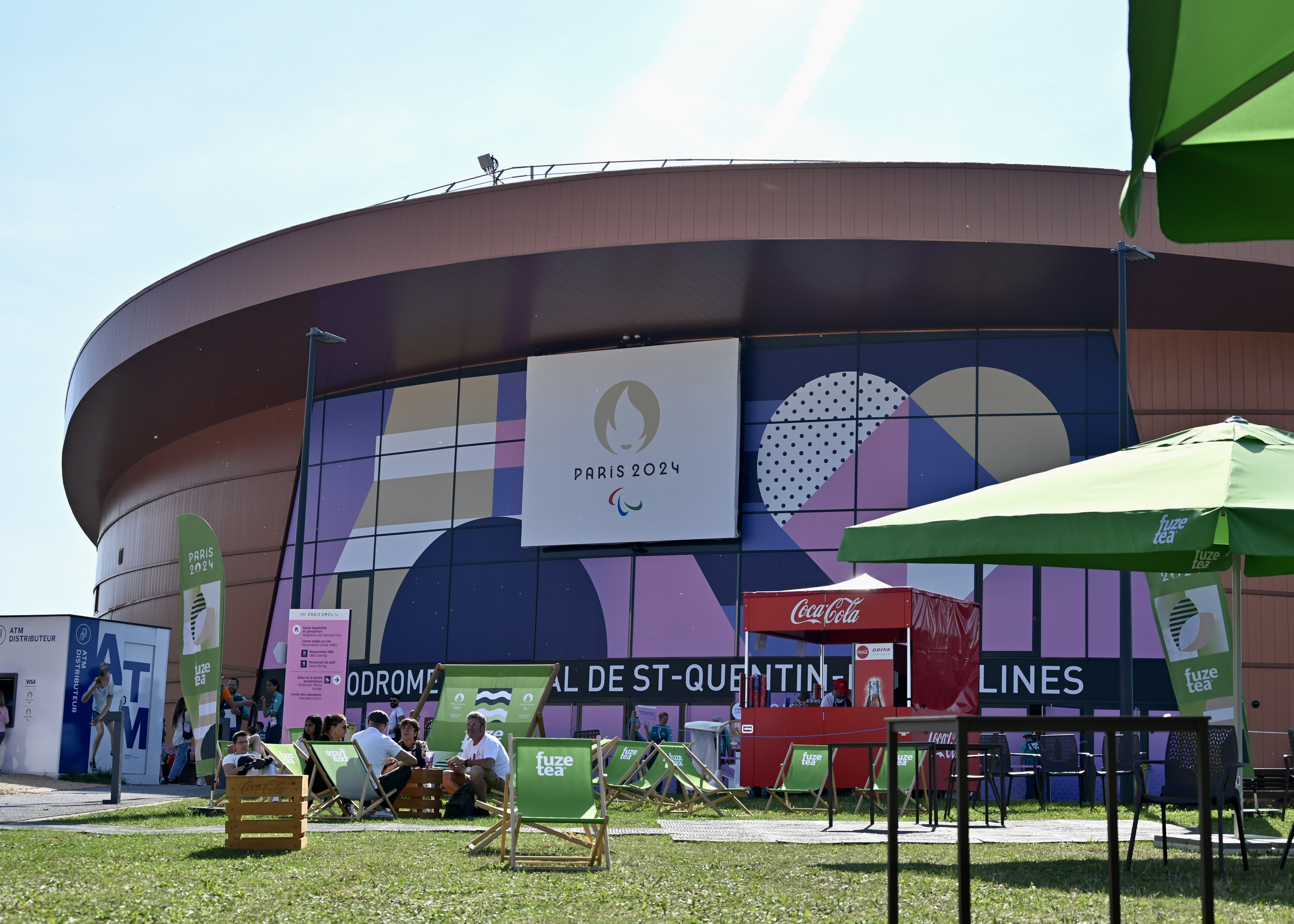
The Vélodrome National during the 2024 Summer Paralympics.

- List of cycling tracks and velodromes

Preceded by Velódromo Alcides Nieto Patiño; Cali	UCI Track Cycling World Championships; Venue; 2015	Succeeded by London Velodrome; London
Preceded by Vélodrome Couvert Régional Jean-Stablinski; Roubaix	UCI Track Cycling World Championships; Venue; 2022	Succeeded by Sir Chris Hoy Velodrome; Glasgow
