= Athletics at the 2020 Summer Paralympics – Women's long jump =

The Women's long jump athletics events for the 2020 Summer Paralympics took place at the Tokyo National Stadium from August 27 to September 3, 2021. A total of 8 events were contested in this discipline.

== Schedule ==
R	Round 1	½	Semifinals	F	Final

Date	Fri 27		Sat 28		Sun 29		Mon 30		Tue 31		Wed 1		Thu 2		Fri 3	
Event	M	E	M	E	M	E	M	E	M	E	M	E	M	E	M	E
T11	F															
T12					F											
T20																F
T37						F										
T38										F						
T47															F	
T63														F		
T64			F													

== Medal summary ==
The following is a summary of the medals awarded across all long jump events.

Classification	Gold		Silver		Bronze	
T11	Silvânia Costa de Oliveira; Brazil	5.00	Asila Mirzayorova; Uzbekistan	4.91	Yuliia Pavlenko; Ukraine	4.86
T12	Oksana Zubkovska; Ukraine	5.54	Sara Martínez; Spain	5.38	Lynda Hamri; Algeria	5.33
T20	Karolina Kucharczyk; Poland	6.03 GR	Aleksandra Ruchkina; RPC	5.49	Mikela Ristoski; Croatia	5.46
T37	Wen Xiaoyan; China	5.13	Jaleen Roberts; United States	4.65	Anna Sapozhnikova; RPC	4.56
T38	Luca Ekler; Hungary	5.63 WR	Margarita Goncharova; RPC	5.29	Olivia Breen; Great Britain	4.91
T47	Anna Grimaldi; New Zealand	5.76 GR	Aleksandra Moguchaia; RPC	5.67	Kiara Rodriguez; Ecuador	5.63 AR
T63	Vanessa Low; Australia	5.28 WR	Martina Caironi; Italy	5.14	Elena Kratter; Switzerland	5.01
T64	Fleur Jong; Netherlands	6.16 WR	Marie-Amélie Le Fur; France	6.11 GR	Marlene van Gansewinkel; Netherlands	5.78

== Results ==
=== T11 ===
The T11 category is for athletes with a visual impairment. A T11 athlete may be entirely without sight, or be able to perceive light, but have no ability to see the shape of a hand at any distance. T11 athletes commonly run with guides.

Records

Prior to this competition, the existing world, Paralympic, and area records were as follows:

World record	Silvânia Costa de Oliveira (BRA)	5.46	São Paulo, Brazil	17 July 2016
Paralympic record	Purificación Ortiz (ESP)	5.07	Atlanta, Georgia	19 August 1996

Area	Distance (m)	Wind	Athlete	Nation
Africa	4.89	-0.5	Record Mark	
America	5.46 WR	+0.1	Silvânia Costa de Oliveira	Brazil
Asia	4.99	-0.5	Zhou Guohua	China
Europe	5.21	+0.0	Purificación Ortiz	Spain
Oceania	Vacant			

Results

The final in this classification took place on 27 August 2021, at 9:30:

Rank	Athlete	Nationality	1	2	3	4	5	6	Best	Notes
1st place, gold medalist(s)	Silvânia Costa de Oliveira	Brazil	x	x	4.76	4.69	5.00	4.84	5.00	SB
2nd place, silver medalist(s)	Asila Mirzayorova	Uzbekistan	x	4.89	4.64	x	4.80	4.91	4.91	PB
3rd place, bronze medalist(s)	Yuliia Pavlenko	Ukraine	4.84	x	4.86	4.75	4.81	4.74	4.86	
4	Lorena Salvatini Spoladore	Brazil	4.41	4.54	x	4.74	4.77	4.70	4.77	SB
5	Chiaki Takada	Japan	4.74	4.57	x	4.57	4.59	4.44	4.74	PB
6	Viktoria Karlsson	Sweden	4.25	4.44	x	4.40	4.41	4.55	4.55	
7	Janjira Panyatib	Thailand	4.27	4.30	4.31	4.32	4.01	4.06	4.32	
8	Lahja Ishitile	Namibia	x	4.23	4.26	4.19	x	4.52	4.52	

=== T12 ===
The T12 category is for athletes with visual impairment. Athletes in this category will generally have some residual sight, the ability to recognise the shape of a hand at a distance of 2 metres and the ability to perceive clearly will be no more than 2/60. T12 athletes commonly run with guides.

Records

Prior to this competition, the existing world, Paralympic, and area records were as follows:

World record	Oksana Zubkovska (UKR)	6.60	London, United Kingdom	7 September 2012
Paralympic record	Oksana Zubkovska (UKR)	6.60	London, United Kingdom	7 September 2012

Area	Distance (m)	Wind	Athlete	Nation
Africa	5.71	+0.8	Lynda Hamri	Algeria
America	5.71	+0.7	Daineris Mijans	Cuba
Asia	5.74	+0.7	Liu Miaomiao	China
Europe	6.60 WR	-0.9	Oksana Zubkovska	Ukraine
Oceania	3.41	+1.0	Record Mark	

Results

The final in this classification took place on 29 August 2021, at 9:30:

Rank	Athlete	Nationality	1	2	3	4	5	6	Best	Notes
1st place, gold medalist(s)	Oksana Zubkovska	Ukraine	5.15	5.24	5.54	-	-	x	5.54	
2nd place, silver medalist(s)	Sara Martínez	Spain	5.22	5.38	5.21	4.09	5.14	3.79	5.38	
3rd place, bronze medalist(s)	Lynda Hamri	Algeria	5.33	5.28	5.13	5.11	5.08	5.25	5.33	SB
4	Yokutkhon Kholbekova	Uzbekistan	5.06	5.07	5.32	5.28	5.16	5.04	5.32	PB
5	Uran Sawada	Japan	4.88	4.86	5.00	5.15	4.98	4.88	5.15	SB
6	Anna Kaniuk	Belarus	4.89	4.95	x	4.91	4.88	4.86	4.95	
7	Sara Fernández Roldán	Spain	x	x	4.85	4.62	4.68	4.76	4.85	

=== T20 ===
The T20 category is for athletes with intellectual impairment. T20 athletes have an IQ score of 75 or less.

Records

Prior to this competition, the existing world, Paralympic, and area records were as follows:

World record	Karolina Kucharczyk (POL)	6.21	Dubai, United Arab Emirates	14 November 2019
Paralympic record	Karolina Kucharczyk (POL)	6.00	London, United Kingdom	3 September 2012

Area	Distance (m)	Wind	Athlete	Nation
Africa	4.84	+1.6	Record Mark	
America	5.09	+0.7	Norkelys del Carmen Gonzalez Henriquez	Venezuela
Asia	5.20	-0.4	Siti Noor Radiah Ismail	Malaysia
Europe	6.21 WR	-0.9	Karolina Kucharczyk	Poland
Oceania	4.87	-0.1	Caytlyn Sharp	Australia

Results

The final in this classification took place on 3 September 2021, at 19:00:

Rank	Athlete	Nationality	1	2	3	4	5	6	Best	Notes
1st place, gold medalist(s)	Karolina Kucharczyk	Poland	5.87	6.00	5.80	6.03	5.91	5.79	6.03	GR
2nd place, silver medalist(s)	Aleksandra Ruchkina	RPC	5.24	5.49	x	5.47	5.39	5.26	5.49	
3rd place, bronze medalist(s)	Mikela Ristoski	Croatia	5.38	5.39	5.45	5.46	5.45	x	5.46	
4	Esra Bayrak	Turkey	x	4.89	5.37	x	x	x	5.37	
5	Jardênia Félix	Brazil	5.29	5.29	5.08	5.25	5.28	x	5.29	AR
6	Ana Filipe	Portugal	5.01	5.16	5.02	x	4.93	5.13	5.16	
7	Fatma Damla Altın	Turkey	5.01	5.06	x	x	4.97	x	5.06	
8	Irina Potekhina	RPC	4.99	4.62	4.96	4.47	4.81	x	4.99	
9	Claudia Santos	Portugal	4.82	4.85	4.89	did not advance			4.89	
10	Salima Rozema	Netherlands	4.67	4.69	4.56	did not advance			4.69	

=== T37 ===
The T37 category is for ambulant athletes with cerebral palsy. These athletes have movement and coordination problems on one half of their body. They have good ability in their dominant side of their body (ie hemiplegia).

Records

Prior to this competition, the existing world, Paralympic, and area records were as follows:

World record	Wen Xiaoyan (CHN)	5.22	Dubai, United Arab Emirates	10 November 2019
Paralympic record	Wen Xiaoyan (CHN)	5.14	Rio de Janeiro, Brazil	14 September 2016

Area	Distance (m)	Wind	Athlete	Nation
Africa	4.35	+0.0	Neda Bahi	Tunisia
America	5.08	+0.1	Jaleen Roberts	United States
Asia	5.22 WR	+1.7	Wen Xiaoyan	China
Europe	4.89	-0.1	Zhanna Fekolina	Russia
Oceania	4.92	+0.0	Lisa McIntosh	Australia

Results

The final in this classification took place on 29 August 2021, at 19:12:

Rank	Athlete	Nationality	1	2	3	4	5	6	Best	Notes
1st place, gold medalist(s)	Wen Xiaoyan	China	4.91	x	4.73	5.13	5.11	5.08	5.13	SB
2nd place, silver medalist(s)	Jaleen Roberts	United States	4.54	4.65	4.39	4.40	4.57	4.64	4.65	
3rd place, bronze medalist(s)	Anna Sapozhnikova	RPC	4.56	x	x	4.40	4.49	4.52	4.56	
4	Manon Genest	France	4.40	4.30	4.34	4.11	x	3.97	4.40	
5	Sabina Sukhanova	Uzbekistan	4.14	x	3.94	4.02	4.29	4.36	4.36	PB
6	Marta Piotrowska	Poland	4.28	4.14	4.09	4.14	4.23	4.17	4.28	
7	Anais Anne Lise Angeline	Mauritius	4.07	3.66	3.67	3.88	3.91	3.56	4.07	
8	Bergrun Osk Adalsteinsdottir	Iceland	3.74	x	4.04	3.85	4.01	3.92	4.04	
9	Francesca Cipelli	Italy	3.93	3.59	3.96	did not advance			3.96	

=== T38 ===
The T38 category is for ambulant athletes with cerebral palsy. T38 athletes have the mildest form of impairment caused by cerebral palsy, often in only one limb, and not affecting the ability to run, walk or jump freely, although impairing performance. T38 athletes may suffer minor co-ordination difficulties.

Records

Prior to this competition, the existing world, Paralympic, and area records were as follows:

World record	Luca Ekler (HUN)	5.51	Bydgoszcz, Poland	4 June 2021
Paralympic record	Margarita Goncharova (RUS)	4.84	London, United Kingdom	31 August 2012

Area	Distance (m)	Wind	Athlete	Nation
Africa	4.23	+0.7	Juanelie Meijer	South Africa
America	4.72	+0.7	Jenifer Martins dos Santos	Brazil
Asia	4.77	+0.1	Record Mark	
Europe	5.51 WR	+1.1	Luca Ekler	Hungary
Oceania	4.62	+0.4	Taylor Doyle	Australia

Results

The final in this classification took place on 31 August 2021, at 19:00:

Rank	Athlete	Nationality	1	2	3	4	5	6	Best	Notes
1st place, gold medalist(s)	Luca Ekler	Hungary	5.60	x	5.63	x	x	4.00	5.63	WR
2nd place, silver medalist(s)	Margarita Goncharova	RPC	5.03	4.99	x	5.29 w	5.09	5.23	5.29 w	
3rd place, bronze medalist(s)	Olivia Breen	Great Britain	4.91	x	x	4.72	4.72	4.65	4.91	
4	Aleksandra Nedelko	RPC	4.37	x	x	4.32	4.37	4.25	4.37	
5	Anna Trener-Wierciak	Poland	4.22	x	x	x	x	4.33	4.33	
6	Hetty Bartlett	Great Britain	x	3.89	4.05	3.86	3.76	3.99	4.05	

=== T47 ===
The T47 category is for athletes who have a single below elbow or wrist amputation or similar disability, with normal function in both legs.

Records

Prior to this competition, the existing world, Paralympic, and area records were as follows:

World record	Carlee Beattie (AUS)	6.01	Sydney, Australia	9 March 2013
Paralympic record	Iryna Leantsiuk (BLR)	5.71	Athens, Greece	20 September 2004

Area	Distance (m)	Wind	Athlete	Nation
Africa	4.73	+0.2	Ahiakwo Joy Ozioma	Nigeria
America	5.60	+1.1	Kiara Rodriguez	Ecuador
Asia	5.41	-1.1	Ouyang Jingling	China
Europe	5.92	-0.1	Nikol Rodomakina	Russia
Oceania	6.01 WR	+0.8	Carlee Beattie	Australia

Results

The final in this classification took place on 3 September 2021, at 9:35:

Rank	Athlete	Nationality	Class	1	2	3	4	5	6	Best	Notes
1st place, gold medalist(s)	Anna Grimaldi	New Zealand	T47	5.74	x	x	5.76	5.64	4.55	5.76	GR
2nd place, silver medalist(s)	Aleksandra Moguchaia	RPC	T46	5.47	5.67	5.40	5.59	5.32	5.67	5.67	SB
3rd place, bronze medalist(s)	Kiara Rodriguez	Ecuador	T46	5.63	x	x	5.20	x	x	5.63	AR
4	Taleah Williams	United States	T47	5.17	5.19	x	5.07	5.39	5.21	5.39	
5	Amy Watt	Canada	T47	5.14	5.28	5.15	5.18	x	4.82	5.28	
6	Styliani Smaragdi	Greece	T47	5.04	x	5.19	x	5.05	5.10	5.19	
7	Polly Maton	Great Britain	T46	5.06	5.19	5.05	4.95	4.89	5.05	5.19	
8	Angelina Lanza	France	T46	5.17	3.58	4.85	4.54	x	4.59	5.17	
9	Kumudu P. Dissanayake Mudiyanselage	Sri Lanka	T46	4.92	4.77	4.73	did not advance			4.92	PB
10	Aldana Isabel Ibanez	Argentina	T47	x	4.71	4.86	did not advance			4.86	
11	Bjørk Nørremark	Denmark	T47	x	x	4.77	did not advance			4.77	
12	Paola del Valle Garcia Ramos	Venezuela	T46	4.63	4.68	4.45	did not advance			4.68	

=== T63 ===
Records

Prior to this competition, the existing world, Paralympic, and area records were as follows:

World record	Martina Caironi (ITA)	5.19	Nembro, Italy	17 June 2021
Paralympic record	Vacant	–		

Area	Distance (m)	Wind	Athlete	Nation
Africa	2.72	-2.4	Record Mark	
America	4.10	-3.7	Lacey Henderson	United States
Asia	4.56	-1.7	Tomomi Tozawa	Japan
Europe	5.19 WR	+1.0	Martina Caironi	Italy
Oceania	4.38	-0.5	Kelly Cartwright	Australia

Results

The final in this classification took place on 2 September 2021, at 19:00:

Rank	Athlete	Nationality	Class	1	2	3	4	5	6	Best	Notes
1st place, gold medalist(s)	Vanessa Low	Australia	T61	4.48	5.16	4.88	3.96	5.20	5.28	5.28	WR
2nd place, silver medalist(s)	Martina Caironi	Italy	T63	x	5.01	x	4.88	5.14	4.72	5.14	
3rd place, bronze medalist(s)	Elena Kratter	Switzerland	T63	4.56	4.61	4.71	4.81	5.01	4.71	5.01	PB
4	Tomomi Tozawa	Japan	T63	x	x	4.12	x	x	4.39	4.39	
5	Kaede Maegawa	Japan	T63	3.98	x	4.17	4.23	x	4.19	4.23	
6	Desiree Vila Bargiela	Spain	T63	3.99	3.83	4.00	3.81	4.02	3.59	4.02	
7	Fleur Schouten	Netherlands	T63	x	3.88	3.84	3.47	3.97	x	3.97	
8	Sofia Gonzalez	Switzerland	T63	3.96	3.75	3.67	3.53	3.55	2.90	3.96	PB
	Gitte Haenen	Belgium	T63	3.51	x	3.72	did not advance			3.72	SB
	Ana Claudia Maria da Silva	Brazil	T42	3.63	3.41	3.38	did not advance			3.63	

=== T64 ===
Records

Prior to this competition, the existing world, Paralympic, and area records were as follows:

World record	Marie-Amélie Le Fur (FRA)	6.14	Dubai, United Arab Emirates	11 February 2021
Paralympic record	Marie-Amélie Le Fur (FRA)	5.83	Rio de Janeiro, Brazil	9 September 2016

Area	Distance (m)	Wind	Athlete	Nation
Africa	Vacant			
American	5.21	-0.3	Beatriz Hatz	United States
Asia	5.70	+0.4	Maya Nakanishi	Japan
Europe	6.14 WR	+0.1	Marie-Amélie Le Fur	France
Oceania	5.49	+0.0	Sarah Walsh	Australia

Results

The final in this classification took place on 28 August 2021, at 10:42:

Rank	Athlete	Nationality	Class	1	2	3	4	5	6	Best	Notes
1st place, gold medalist(s)	Fleur Jong	Netherlands	T62	6.16	5.83	x	5.93	x	x	6.16	WR
2nd place, silver medalist(s)	Marie-Amélie Le Fur	France	T64	5.78	5.99	5.83	5.60	5.92	6.11	6.11	PR
3rd place, bronze medalist(s)	Marlene van Gansewinkel	Netherlands	T64	5.60	x	5.46	5.78	5.22	5.62	5.78	
4	Stefanie Reid	Great Britain	T64	x	5.55	x	5.39	5.75	5.63	5.75	SB
5	Beatriz Hatz	United States	T64	x	5.43	5.11	5.10	5.24	5.34	5.43	AR
6	Maya Nakanishi	Japan	T64	x	5.12	x	4.93	5.27	x	5.27	
7	Sarah Walsh	Australia	T64	5.01	5.11	4.73	x	4.88	5.03	5.11	
8	Saki Takakuwa	Japan	T64	3.19	4.88	4.55	x	3.64	4.72	4.88	
9	Typhaine Soldé	France	T64	x	4.60	3.97				4.60	
10	Sara Andres Barrio	Spain	T62	4.30	4.54	4.46				4.54	
