= 2019 World Para Athletics Championships – Women's long jump =

The women's long jump at the 2019 World Para Athletics Championships was held at the Dubai Club for People with Determination in Dubai from 7–15 November.

== Medalists ==
Event	Gold		Silver		Bronze	
T11	Zhou Guohua; China	4.92 SB	Yuliia Pavlenko; Ukraine	4.87 PB	Meritxell Playa Faus; Spain	4.74 SB
T12	Oksana Zubkovska; Ukraine	5.73 SB	Lynda Hamri; Algeria	5.58	Gabriela Mendonça Ferreira; Brazil	5.54 PB
T20	Karolina Kucharczyk; Poland	6.21 WR	Aleksandra Ruchkina; Russia	5.62	Mikela Ristoski; Croatia	5.61 SB
T37	Wen Xiaoyan; China	5.22 WR	Jaleen Roberts; United States	4.81	Marta Piotrowska; Poland	4.45 SB
T38	Luca Ekler; Hungary	5.31 CR	Margarita Goncharova; Russia	5.10	Olivia Breen; United Kingdom	4.93
T47	Kiara Rodriguez; Ecuador	5.52	Anna Grimaldi; New Zealand	5.50 SB	Aleksandra Moguchaia; Russia	5.45
T63	Vanessa Low; Australia	4.68	Gitte Haenen; Belgium	4.41	Tomomi Tozawa; Japan	4.33
T64	Maya Nakanishi; Japan	5.37 SB	Marlene van Gansewinkel; Netherlands	5.28	Sarah Walsh; Australia	5.20 =AR

== Detailed results ==
=== T11 ===
Rank	Athlete	Result	Notes
1st place, gold medalist(s)	Zhou Guohua; China	4.92	SB
2nd place, silver medalist(s)	Yuliia Pavlenko; Ukraine	4.87	
3rd place, bronze medalist(s)	Meritxell Playa Faus; Spain	4.74	
4	Chiaki Takada; Japan	4.69	
5	Viktoria Karlsson; Sweden	4.65	
6	Arjola Dedaj; Italy	4.60	
7	Asila Mirzayorova; Uzbekistan	4.44	
8	Lahja Ishitile; Namibia	4.44	
9	Janjira Panyatib; Thailand	3.92	
10	Lorena Salvatini Spoladore; Brazil	3.32	

=== T12 ===
Rank	Athlete	Result	Notes
1st place, gold medalist(s)	Oksana Zubkovska; Ukraine	5.73	SB
2nd place, silver medalist(s)	Lynda Hamri; Algeria	5.58	
3rd place, bronze medalist(s)	Gabriela Mendonça Ferreira; Brazil	5.54	
4	Sara Martínez; Spain	5.40	
5	Uran Sawada; Japan	5.27	
6	Anna Kaniuk; Belarus	5.13	
7	Katrin Mueller-Rottgardt; Germany	4.91	
8	Sara Fernandez Roldan; Spain	4.78	
9	Shen Yaqin; China	4.45	

=== T20 ===
Rank	Athlete	Result	Notes
1st place, gold medalist(s)	Karolina Kucharczyk; Poland	6.21	WR
2nd place, silver medalist(s)	Aleksandra Ruchkina; Russia	5.62	
3rd place, bronze medalist(s)	Mikela Ristoski; Croatia	5.61	
4	Érica Gomes; Portugal	5.46	
5	Esra Bayrak; Turkey	5.38	
6	Irina Potekhina; Russia	5.33	
7	Ana Filipe; Portugal	5.24	
8	Martina Barber; United Kingdom	5.20	
9	Siti Noor Radiah Ismail; Malaysia	5.13	
10	Claudia Santos; Portugal	5.12	
11	Stefania Gudmundsdottir; Iceland	4.81	
12	Fatma Damla Altin; Turkey	4.58	

=== T37 ===
Rank	Athlete	Result	Notes
1st place, gold medalist(s)	Wen Xiaoyan; China	5.22	WR
2nd place, silver medalist(s)	Jaleen Roberts; United States	4.81	
3rd place, bronze medalist(s)	Marta Piotrowska; Poland	4.45	
4	Manon Genest; France	4.30	
5	Bergrun Adalsteinsdottir; Iceland	4.27	
6	Sabina Sukhanova; Uzbekistan	4.25	
7	Anais Anne Lise Angeline; Mauritius	4.15	
8	Francesca Cipelli; Italy	3.99	
9	Anna Sapozhnikova; Russia	3.98	

=== T38 ===
Rank	Athlete	Result	Notes
1st place, gold medalist(s)	Luca Ekler; Hungary	5.31	CR
2nd place, silver medalist(s)	Margarita Goncharova; Russia	5.10	
3rd place, bronze medalist(s)	Olivia Breen; United Kingdom	4.93	
4	Róża Kozakowska; Poland	4.70	SB
5	Aleksandra Nedelko; Russia	4.67	
6	Nele Moos; Germany	4.49	
7	Anna Trener-Wierciak; Poland	4.36	
8	Maria Fernandes; Portugal	4.00	
9	Rafailia Vaia Apostolou; Greece	3.76	

=== T47 ===
Rank	Athlete	Result	Notes
1st place, gold medalist(s)	Kiara Rodriguez; Ecuador	5.52	
2nd place, silver medalist(s)	Anna Grimaldi; New Zealand	5.50	
3rd place, bronze medalist(s)	Aleksandra Moguchaia; Russia	5.45	
4	Nikol Rodomakina; Russia	5.32	
5	Angelina Lanza; France	5.27	
6	Taleah Williams; United States	5.25	
7	Styliani Smaragdi; Greece	5.02	
8	Amy Watt; Canada	4.69	
9	Kumudu Dissanayake Mudiyanselage; Sri Lanka	4.51	
10	Esra Genc; Turkey	4.44	
11	Dilba Tanrikulu; Turkey	4.40	

=== T63 ===
Rank	Athlete	Result	Notes
1st place, gold medalist(s)	Vanessa Low; Australia	4.68	
2nd place, silver medalist(s)	Gitte Haenen; Belgium	4.41	
3rd place, bronze medalist(s)	Tomomi Tozawa; Japan	4.33	
4	Kaede Maegawa; Japan	4.13	
5	Karisma Evi Tiarani; Indonesia	3.97	
6	Fleur Schouten; Netherlands	3.96	
7	Sayaka Murakami; Japan	3.63	
8	Desirée Vila Bargiela; Spain	3.60	
9	Sofia Gonzalez; Switzerland	3.60	
10	Scout Bassett; United States	3.33	
11	Lacey Henderson; United States	3.28	

=== T64 ===
Rank	Athlete	Result	Notes
1st place, gold medalist(s)	Maya Nakanishi; Japan	5.37	SB
2nd place, silver medalist(s)	Marlene van Gansewinkel; Netherlands	5.28	
3rd place, bronze medalist(s)	Sarah Walsh; Australia	5.20	
4	Fleur Jong; Netherlands	5.16	
5	Beatriz Hatz; United States	5.11	
6	Saki Takakuwa; Japan	5.04	
7	Sara Andres Barrio; Spain	4.64	
8	Maria Tietze; Germany	4.26	
9	Typhaine Soldé; France	3.90	
10	Madison Wilson-Walker; Canada	3.59	

== See also ==
- List of IPC world records in athletics
