= Athletics at the 2020 Summer Paralympics – Women's 100 metres T63 =

Women's 100 metres T63 at the XVI Paralympic Games
- Venue: Tokyo National Stadium
- Dates: 4 September 2021 (final)
- Competitors: 13 from 9 nations
- Winning time: 14.11

Medalists
| 1st place, gold medalist(s) | | Ambra Sabatini | Italy |
| 2nd place, silver medalist(s) | | Martina Caironi | Italy |
| 3rd place, bronze medalist(s) | | Monica Contrafatto | Italy |

The women's 100 metres T63 event at the 2020 Summer Paralympics in Tokyo, took place on 4 September 2021.

== Records ==
Prior to the competition, the existing records were as follows:

| World record | Ambra Sabatini (ITA) | 14.59 | Dubai, United Arab Emirates | 12 February 2021 |
| Paralympic record | Martina Caironi (ITA) | 14.80 | Rio de Janeiro, Brazil | 17 September 2016 |

| Area | Time | Athlete | Nation |
|---|---|---|---|
| Africa | 19.79 | Record Mark | |
| America | 16.31 | Noelle Lambert | United States |
| Asia | 15.75 | Tomomi Tozawa | Japan |
| Europe | 14.59 WR | Ambra Sabatini | Italy |
| Oceania | 16.14 | Kelly Cartwright | Australia |

== Results ==
=== Heats ===
Heat 1 took place on 4 September 2021, at 11:02:

| Rank | Lane | Name | Nationality | Class | Time | Notes |
|---|---|---|---|---|---|---|
| 1 | 3 | Ambra Sabatini | Italy | T63 | 14.39 | Q, WR |
| 2 | 5 | Monica Contrafatto | Italy | T63 | 14.72 | Q, PB |
| 3 | 4 | Elena Kratter | Switzerland | T63 | 15.02 | Q, PB |
| 4 | 8 | Noelle Lambert | United States | T63 | 16.20 | q, AR |
| 5 | 2 | Tomomi Tozawa | Japan | T63 | 16.26 | q |
| 6 | 7 | Fleur Schouten | Netherlands | T63 | 16.82 | SB |
| 7 | 6 | Desirée Vila Bargiela | Spain | T63 | 16.84 | PB |

Heat 2 took place on 4 September 2021, at 11:08:

| Rank | Lane | Name | Nationality | Class | Time | Notes |
|---|---|---|---|---|---|---|
| 1 | 5 | Martina Caironi | Italy | T63 | 14.37 | Q, WR |
| 2 | 6 | Karisma Evi Tiarani | Indonesia | T42 | 14.83 | Q, SB |
| 3 | 4 | Sofia Gonzalez | Switzerland | T63 | 16.17 | Q, PB |
| 4 | 8 | Kaede Maegawa | Japan | T63 | 16.57 | |
| 5 | 3 | Ana Cláudia Maria da Silva | Brazil | T42 | 16.63 | |
| 6 | 7 | Gitte Haenen | Belgium | T63 | 16.70 | SB |

=== Final ===
The final took place on 4 September 2021, at 21:26:

| Rank | Lane | Name | Nationality | Class | Time | Notes |
|---|---|---|---|---|---|---|
| 1st place, gold medalist(s) | 7 | Ambra Sabatini | Italy | T63 | 14.11 | WR |
| 2nd place, silver medalist(s) | 6 | Martina Caironi | Italy | T63 | 14.46 | |
| 3rd place, bronze medalist(s) | 4 | Monica Contrafatto | Italy | T63 | 14.73 | |
| 4 | 5 | Karisma Evi Tiarani | Indonesia | T42 | 14.83 | GR (T42) |
| 5 | 9 | Elena Kratter | Switzerland | T63 | 15.07 | |
| 6 | 2 | Noelle Lambert | United States | T63 | 15.97 | AR |
| 7 | 8 | Sofia Gonzalez | Switzerland | T63 | 16.38 | |
| 8 | 3 | Tomomi Tozawa | Japan | T63 | 16.48 | |
