= 2021 World Para Athletics European Championships – Women's long jump =

The women's long jump events were held at the 2021 World Para Athletics European Championships in Bydgoszcz, Poland.

== Medalists ==
Event	Gold		Silver		Bronze	
T11	Yuliia Pavlenko (UKR)	4.91 CR	Viktoria Karlsson (SWE)	4.70	Arjola Dedaj (ITA)	4.49
T12	Oksana Zubkovska (UKR)	5.57 CR	Sara Martínez (ESP)	5.31	Anna Kaniuk (BLR)	5.01
T20	Karolina Kucharczyk (POL)	6.13	Aleksandra Ruchkina (RUS)	5.59	Mikela Ristoski (CRO)	5.54
T37	Anna Sapozhnikova (RUS)	4.60 PB	Manon Genest (FRA)	4.51 PB	Marta Piotrowska (POL)	4.44
T38	Luca Ekler (HUN)	5.51 =WR	Margarita Goncharova (RUS)	5.25 PB	Olivia Breen (GBR)	4.94
T47	Aleksandra Moguchaia (RUS)	5.59 CR	Nikol Rodomakina (RUS)	5.32	Polly Maton (GBR)	5.28 =PB
T63	Martina Caironi (ITA)	5.06 WR	Elena Kratter (SUI)	4.30 PB	Desirée Vila Bargiela (ESP)	4.23 PB
T64	Fleur Jong (NED)	6.06 WR	Marlene van Gansewinkel (NED)	5.82 PB	Stef Reid (GBR)	5.26
WR world record | ER European record | CR championship record | NR national record | WL world leading | EL European leading | PB personal best | SB seasonal best

== See also ==
- List of IPC world records in athletics
