= Athletics at the 2024 Summer Paralympics – Women's 100 metres T63 =

Women's 100 metres T63 at the XVII Paralympic Games
- Venue: Stade de France
- Dates: 7 September 2024
- Competitors: 10 from 6 nations
- Winning time: 14.16

Medalists
1st place, gold medalist(s)		Martina Caironi	Italy
2nd place, silver medalist(s)		Karisma Evi Tiarani	Indonesia
3rd place, bronze medalist(s)		Monica Contrafatto	Italy
3rd place, bronze medalist(s)		Ndidikama Okoh	Great Britain

100 metres at the 2024 Summer Paralympics
Men · T11 · T12 · T13 · T34 · T35 · T36 · T37 · T38 · T44 · T47 · T51 · T52 · T53 · T54 · T63 · T64
Women · T11 · T12 · T13 · T34 · T35 · T36 · T37 · T38 · T47 · T53 · T54 · T63 · T64

The women's 100 metres T63 event at the 2024 Summer Paralympics in Paris, took place on 7 September 2024.

== Classification ==
The event is open to T42 and T63 athletes. Athletes may have movement moderately affected in one leg or the absence of limbs above the knee.

== Records ==
Prior to the competition, the existing records were as follows:

T42
World record	Karisma Evi Tiarani (INA)	14.37	(China) Hangzhou	26 October 2023
Paralympic record	Karisma Evi Tiarani (INA)	14.83	(Japan) Tokyo	4 September 2021

Area	Time		Athlete	Location	Date
Africa	19.49		(South Africa) Carine Swanepoel	(South Africa) Durban	15 March 2005
America	15.64		(Brazil) Ana Cláudia Silva	(Brazil) São Paulo	25 April 2019
Asia	14.37	WR	(Indonesia) Karisma Evi Tiarani	(China) Hangzhou	26 October 2023
Europe	Vacant				
Oceania	Vacant				

T63
World record	Ambra Sabatini (ITA)	13.98	(France) Paris	13 July 2023
Paralympic record	Ambra Sabatini (ITA)	14.11	(Japan) Tokyo	4 September 2021

Area	Time		Athlete	Location	Date
Africa	19.79		Record mark		
America	14.95		(United States) Lindi Marcusen	(United States) Miramar	19 July 2024
Asia	15.75		(Japan) Tomomi Tozawa	(Japan) Tottori City	6 June 2021
Europe	13.98	WR	(Italy) Ambra Sabatini	(France) Paris	13 July 2023
Oceania	16.14		(Australia) Kelly Cartwright	(United Kingdom) London	5 September 2012

== Results ==
=== Round 1 ===
Heat 1 took place on 7 September 2024: First 3 in each heat (Q) and the next 2 fastest (q) advance to the final

Rank	Lane	Class	Athlete	Nation	Time	Notes
1	6	T63	Monica Contrafatto	Italy	14.33 (.326)	Q, PB
2	3	T63	Ambra Sabatini	Italy	14.33 (.330)	Q, SB
3	7	T42	Ndidikama Okoh	Great Britain	14.69	Q, PR
4	5	T63	Noelle Lambert	United States	15.38	q
5	4	T63	Tomomi Tozawa	Japan	15.85	
Source:					Wind: +0.5 m/s	

Heat 2 took place on 7 September 2024:

Rank	Lane	Class	Athlete	Nation	Time	Notes
1	3	T63	Martina Caironi	Italy	14.31	Q, SB
2	4	T42	Karisma Evi Tiarani	Indonesia	14.34	Q, WR
3	6	T63	Elena Kratter	Switzerland	15.06	Q, SB
4	7	T63	Lindi Marcusen	United States	15.09	q
5	5	T63	Kaede Maegawa	Japan	16.34	
Source:					Wind: +0.2 m/s	

=== Final ===
The final took place on 7 September 2024.

Rank	Lane	Class	Athlete	Nation	Time	Notes
1st place, gold medalist(s)	4	T63	Martina Caironi	Italy	14.16	SB
2nd place, silver medalist(s)	5	T42	Karisma Evi Tiarani	Indonesia	14.26	WR
3rd place, bronze medalist(s)	7	T63	Monica Contrafatto	Italy	14.60	
3rd place, bronze medalist(s)	3	T42	Ndidikama Okoh	Great Britain	14.59	PB
5	8	T63	Elena Kratter	Switzerland	15.00	PB
6	2	T63	Lindi Marcusen	United States	15.11	
7	9	T63	Noelle Lambert	United States	15.39	
—	6	T63	Ambra Sabatini	Italy	DNF	
Source:					Wind: +0.8 m/s	

Notes: Monica Contrafatto awarded joint bronze medal due to interference, after Ambra Sabatini accidentally fell and tripped Contrafatto.
