= Ndidikama Okoh =

British Paralympic athlete

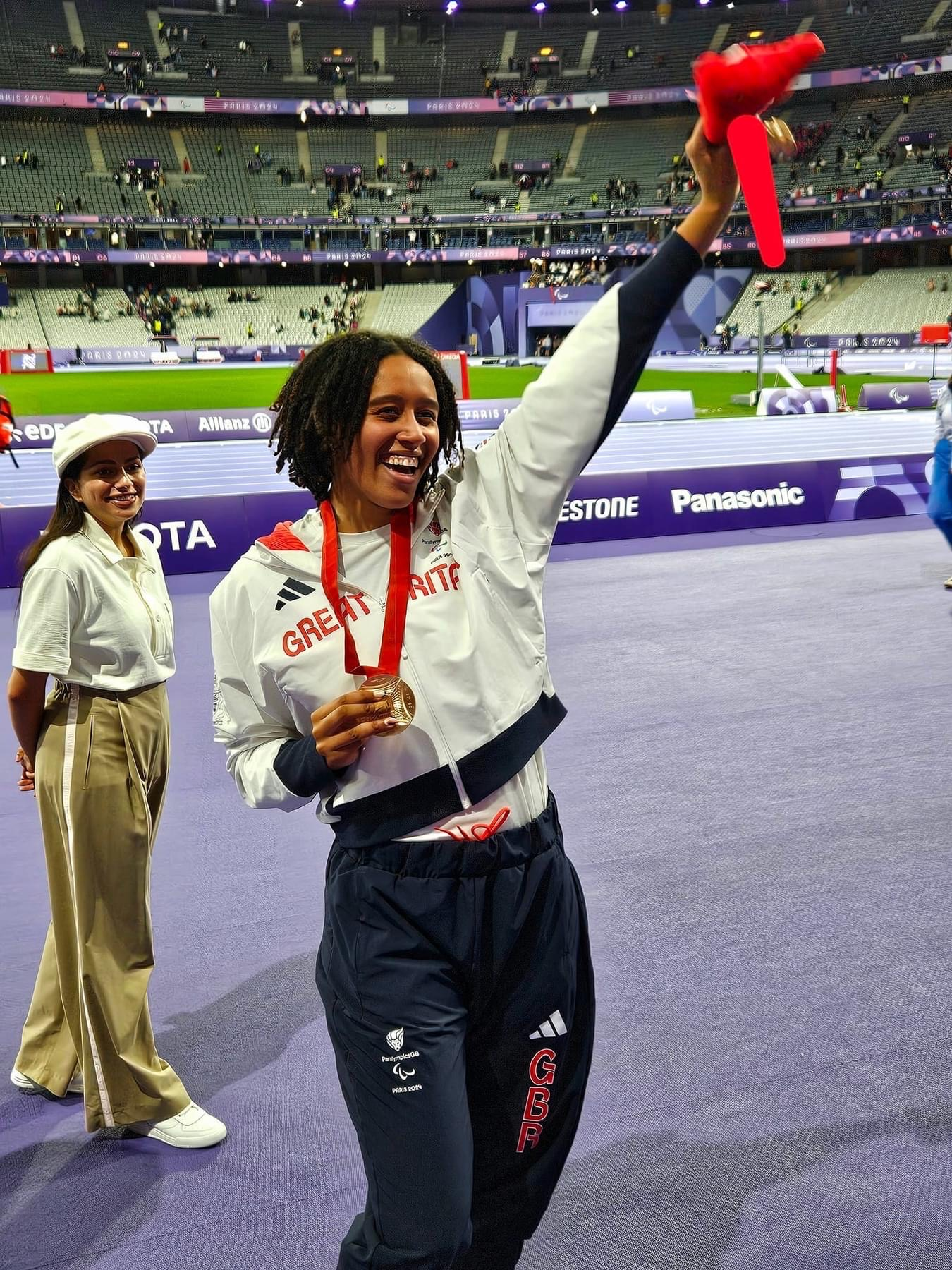
- Okoh celebrating her bronze medal at the 2024 Paralympics

Personal information
- Born: 3 December 2002 (age 23)

Sport
- Country: Great Britain
- Sport: Para athletics
- Disability class: T42
- Events: 100 metres; Long jump
- Club: Birchfield Harriers
Medal record
Women's athletics
Representing Great Britain
Summer Paralympics
Bronze medal – third place	2024 Paris	100 m T63
World Championships
Bronze medal – third place	2025 New Delhi	100 m T63

Ndidikama Okoh (born 3 December 2002) is a British para-athlete who specializes in sprint events. She won a bronze medal at the 2024 Summer Paralympics in Paris.

== Early life and education ==
Okoh was born on 3 December 2002. She attended the University of Birmingham, where she obtained a degree in criminology and law.

== Athletics career ==
At the 2024 Summer Paralympics, Okoh competed in the women's 100 m T63, which took place on 7 September 2024. At Heat 1, she finished in third place, behind Monica Contrafatto and Ambra Sabatini, with all three advancing to the final. In the final, Okoh finished 3rd and was one of two women awarded bronze medals were after an appeal by Monica Contrafatto when her fellow Italian competitor Ambra Sabatini fell outside of her lane just before the finish line and tripped Contrafatto during the fall. Contrafatto's time was recorded while she was falling forward at the finish line because of the trip. Okoh crossed the finish line just before Contrafatto, resulting in a minor time difference between the two bronze medalists.

Okoh competed at the 2025 World Para Athletics Championships, where she won the bronze medal in the 100 m T63.

Okoh also completed at 2026 Commonwealth Games for Team England in the Discus.

== Personal life ==
Okoh suffers from lymphedema, which means she has a leg twice the size as the other.
