= ACT Academy of Sport =

The ACT Academy of Sport (ACTAS) was launched in 1989. It is an endorsed Australian Olympic Committee and Australian Paralympic Committee National Training Centre and a member of the National Institutes of Network.

== History ==
The establishment of ACTAS as a pilot program was announced in the Australian Government's budget delivered in August 1988. ACTAS was allocated a budget of $100,000 as part the Community Development Fund. At the time of the announcement, the Australian Government was responsible for sport development in the Australian Capital Territory. The ACT Government took over responsibility after self government in 1989. ACTAS first Chairman was Dick Telford, head of Australian Institute of Sport Sports Science. ACTAS first executive officer was Jenny Roberts and it was located at the Canberra College of Advanced Education's Centre of Sports Studies. In 1994, it became a partner of the Australian Sports Commission's Olympic Athlete Program, which provided $350,000 to employ eight full-time coaches. In January 1995, there were 11 full and part-time administrators and 10 full-time coaches and a budget of $1 million. In 1995 Ken Norris replaced Jenny Roberts as chief executive officer and ACTAS moved to Bruce Stadium. In 1999, ACTAS was recognized by the Australian Olympic Committee as an Olympic Training Centre. In 2015, ACTAS new training facility was opened as part of upgrade the National Hockey Centre.

== The purpose ==
ACTAS aim is to assist Canberra's elite, and potentially elite athletes and teams improve their sporting performances. It provides a range of athlete performance services - coaching, training, sport science, athlete welfare and development and competition assistance.

== Sports ==
In 2016, ACTAS offers has six sports scholarship programs: basketball, cycling, hockey, football, netball and rowing. It also offers scholarships to individual athletes. In the past these scholarships have been offered to athletes in a range of sports including: athletics, triathlon, judo, boxing, wrestling, swimming, orienteering, squash, table tennis, power-lifting, equestrian and volleyball.

== Notable athletes ==
Since its launch in 1989, ACTAS has developed numerous Olympic, Paralympic and Commonwealth Games representatives.
Athletics

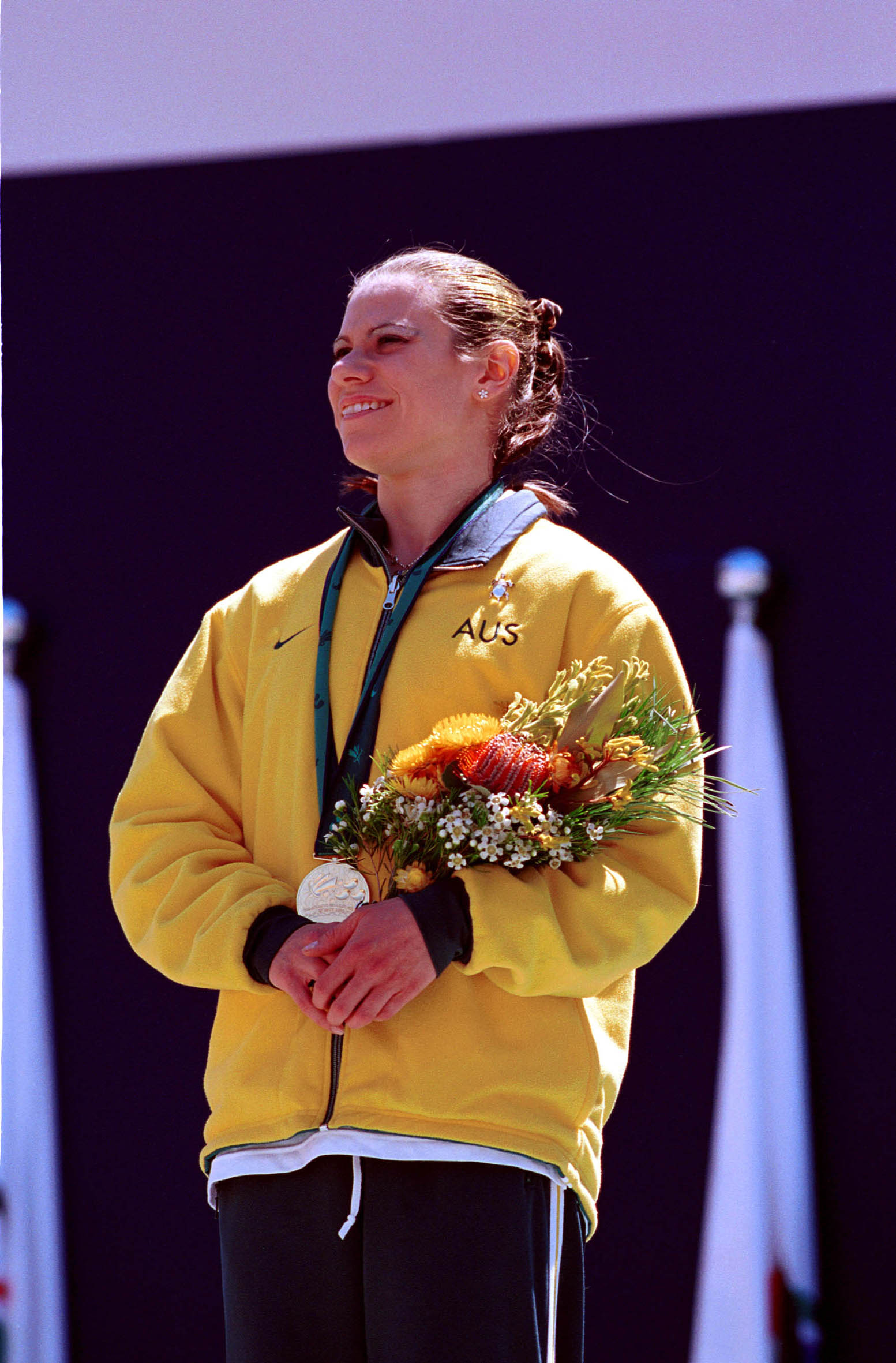
Lisa Llorens on the podium with her gold medal won in the 200 m T20 at the 2000 Summer Paralympics

Olympics: Susan Hobson, Matt Beckenham, Zoe Buckman, Lisa Corrigan, Stuart Rendell, Brendan Cole, Melissa Breen, Lauren Wells
Paralympics: Angie Ballard, Andrew Laggner, Lisa Llorens, Richard Nicholson, Sharon Rackham, Murray Goldfinch, Roy Daniell, Louise Ellery
Commonwealth Games: Susan Hobson, Matt Beckenham, Lisa Corrigan, Brendan Cole, Stuart Rendell, Melissa Breen, Lauren Wells
Baseball
Olympics: Jeff Williams
Basketball

Olympics: Patrick Mills
Paralympics: Tristan Knowles
Boxing
Olympics: Gerard O'Mahony
Commonwealth Games:Gerard O'Mahony, Steven Rudic
Cricket
Australian team: Michael Bevan
Cycling

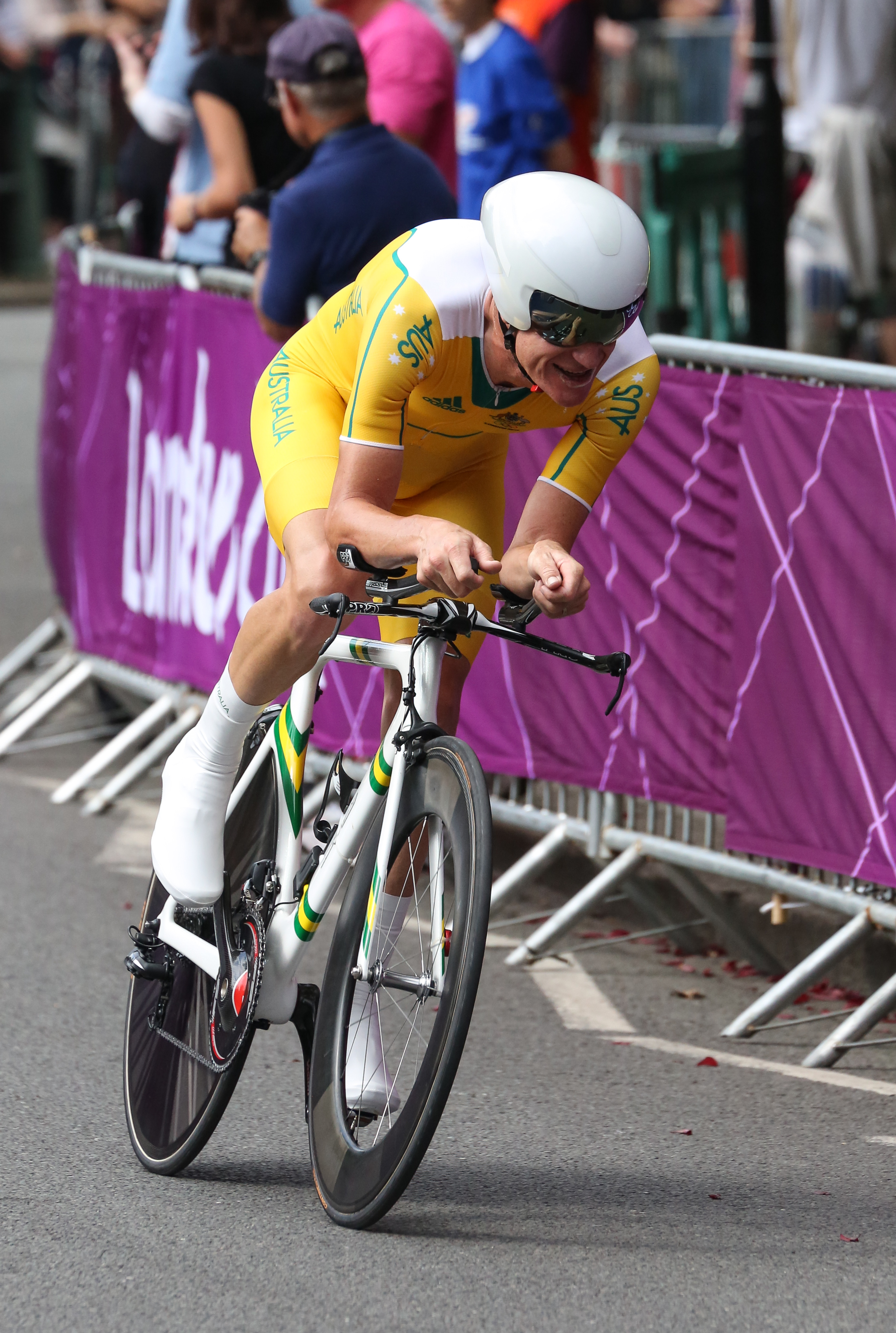
Michael Rogers in Time Trial at 2012 London Olympics

Olympics: Michael Rogers Oenone Wood, Caroline Buchanan, Gracie Elvin, Michael Matthews, Tracey Gaudry, Mary Grigson, Chloe Hosking, Dan Ellis, Rebecca Henderson
Paralympics: Michael Milton, Jane Armstrong, Anthony Biddle, Kial Stewart, Sue Powell
Commonwealth Games: Michael Rogers, Margaret Hemsley, Mary Grigson, Alison Wright, Mathew Hayman, Oenone Wood, Dan Ellis, Chloe Hosking, Gracie Elvin, Nathan Haas, Vicki Whitelaw, Michael Matthews, Nathan Hart, Brandie O'Connor, Thomas Clarke (pilot), Paul Kennedy
Others: Peter Rogers, Deane Rogers, Rebecca Wiasak
Football
Olympics: Peita-Claire Hepperlin, Amy Wilson, Sacha Wainwright, Nikolai Topor-Stanley, Lydia Williams
Other: Julie Murray, George Timotheou
Hockey
Olympics: Anna Flanagan, Glenn Turner, Nicole Arrold, Michael York, Lisa Carruthers, Katrina Powell, Andrew Charter
Commonwealth Games: Michael York, Lisa Carruthers, Katrina Powell, Ben Taylor, Sarah Taylor, Nicole Arrold, Glenn Turner, Anna Flanagan, Edwina Bone, Andrew Charter
Ice Skating
World Championships: Miriam Manzano
Judo
Olympics: Matt D'Aquino, Tom Hill
Lawn Bowls
Commonwealth Games: Adam Jeffrey
Rowing

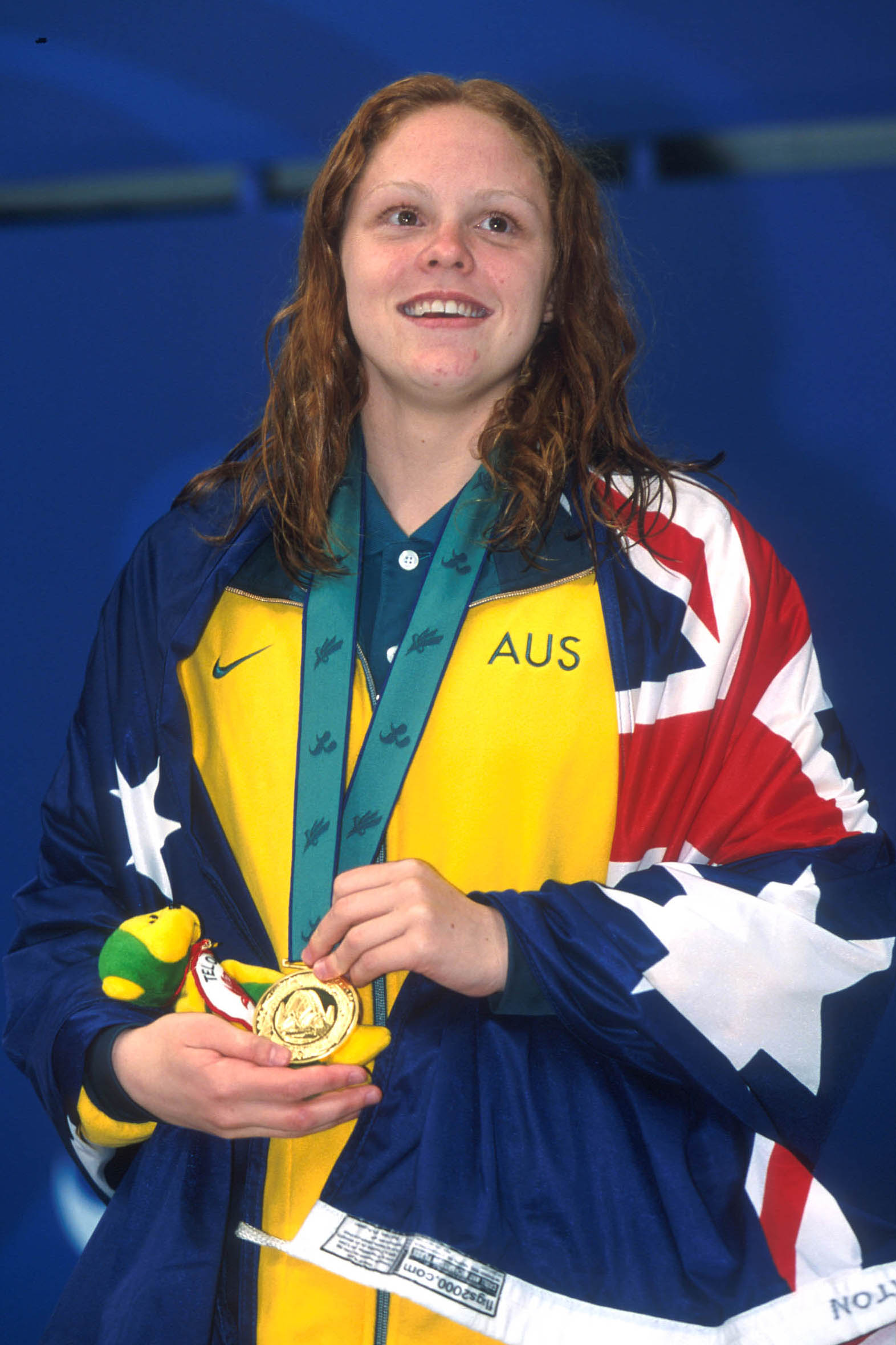
Siobhan Paton wpn six gold medals at 2000 Sydney Paralympics

Olympics: Sarah Cook, Sonia Mills, Kay Hick, Bruce Hick, Kerry Knowler, Jamie Fernandez, Nick Porzig, Brett Hayman, Craig Jones, Jane Robinson
Commonwealth Games: Kay Hick, Jamie Fernandez, Bruce Hick, Nick Portzig, Fleur Spriggs, Craig Jones, Mitchell Punch
Sailing
Olympics: Brendan Todd
Paralympics: Peter Thompson
Skiing
Olympics: Laura Peel
Paralympics: Michael Milton
Shooting
Olympics: Matthew Inabinet
Softball
Olympics: Joanne Brown, Sally McCreedy
Squash
Commonwealth Games: Stuart Boswell
Swimming
Olympics: Angela Kennedy
Paralympics: Siobhan Paton, Katrina Lewis, Joshua Alford
Table tennis
Olympics: Jeff Plumb, Alison Shanley
Triathlon
Olympics: Simon Thompson
Paralympics: Katie Kelly, Nic Beveridge
Volleyball
Olympics: Ben Hardy
Wheelchair Rugby
Paralympics: Garry Croker
