= Beckenham (disambiguation) =

Beckenham is a town in London, England.

Beckenham may also refer to:

- Beckenham (UK Parliament constituency), a former constituency represented in the House of Commons
- Beckenham, Western Australia, a suburb of Perth, Western Australia
- Beckenham, New Zealand, a suburb of Christchurch, New Zealand
- Beckenham Junction station, the main station in the London town
- Municipal Borough of Beckenham, a local authority in Kent, England from 1878 to 1965
- New Beckenham railway station, in the London suburb of the same name.
- Matthew Beckenham (born 1976), Australian hurdler
