= Aleksandra Ruchkina =

Russian Paralympic athlete (born 1997)

Personal information
- Nationality: Russian
- Born: 1 July 1997 (age 28) Kaliningrad, Russia

Sport
- Sport: Track and field
- Disability class: T20
- Event: long jump
Medal record
Women's para athletics
Representing RPC
Paralympic Games
Silver medal – second place	2020 Tokyo	Long jump F20
Representing Russia
World Championships
Silver medal – second place	2019 Dubai	Long jump T20
European Championships
Silver medal – second place	2021 Bydgoszcz	Long jump T20

Aleksandra Ruchkina (born 1 July 1997 in Kaliningrad, Russia) is a Russian Paralympic athlete. At the 2020 Summer Paralympics, she won a silver medal at the Long jump T20 for intellectually impaired athletes.
