= Yuliia Pavlenko =

Ukrainian Paralympic athlete (born 1991)

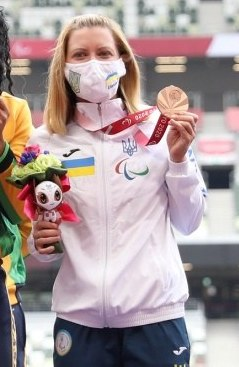

Personal information
- Nationality: Ukrainian
- Born: 9 August 1991 (age 34) Artemivsk, Ukrainian SSR, Soviet Union (Now Bakhmut, Ukraine)

Sport
- Sport: Paralympic athletics
- Disability class: T11
- Club: Invasport
- Coached by: Vyacheslav Ponka
Medal record
Paralympic athletics
Representing Ukraine
Paralympic Games
Bronze medal – third place	2020 Tokyo	Long jump T11
World Championships
Silver medal – second place	2019 Dubai	Long jump T11
European Championships
Gold medal – first place	2021 Bydgoszcz	Long jump T11
Gold medal – first place	2021 Bydgoszcz	100 m T11
Bronze medal – third place	2021 Bydgoszcz	200 m T11

Yuliia Serhiivna Pavlenko (Ukrainian: Ю́лія Сергі́ївна Павленко; born 9 August 1991) is a visually impaired Ukrainian Paralympic athlete. She represented Ukraine at the 2020 Summer Paralympics.

== Career ==
Pavlenko represented Ukraine in the long jump T11 even at the 2020 Summer Paralympics and won a bronze medal.
