= Lauren Wells (hurdler) =

Australian athletics competitor

Lauren Boden
Personal information
- Nationality: Australian
- Born: 3 August 1988 (age 37) Canberra, Australia
- Height: 1.79 m (5 ft 10 1/2 in) (2012)
- Weight: 66 kg (146 lb) (2012)

Sport
- Country: Australia
- Sport: Athletics
- Event(s): 400 metre hurdles 400 metres Long jump
- Coached by: Matt Beckenham

Lauren Boden (born 3 August 1988) is an Australian athletics competitor. Her events are the 400 metre hurdles, 400 metres and long jump. She was the youngest woman to win the 400 metres hurdle event at the Australian national championships. She has competed in the long jump event and the 400 metres hurdle event at the World University Games. She has competed at the 2006 and 2010 Commonwealth Games and the 2012 and 2016 Summer Olympics in the 400 metre hurdles event.

== Personal ==
Boden was born on 3 August 1988 in Canberra. She attended Kaleen Primary School before going to high school at Lyneham High School and Daramalan College. She then attended the University of Canberra, where she earned a Bachelor of Science in Psychology while majoring in sport science. In 2004, she was named the ACT Sports Star of the Year – Junior Athlete and earned the Pierre de Coubertin Award. As of 2012, she lives in Canberra.

Boden is 179 centimetres (70 in) tall and weighs 66 kilograms (146 lb).

People confuse her for Jana Pittman. They look alike and have a similar hurdling style. Many news stories about Boden compare her to Pittman.

== Athletics ==
Boden is an athletics competitor in the 400 metre hurdles event, 400 metres event and the long jump. She started competing in athletics when she was five years old. She competes for the North Canberra/Gungahlin athletics club. She is coached by Matt Beckenham, became her coach in 2003. Her training partner is Melissa Breen. She has held an athletics scholarship from the ACT Academy of Sport and the Australian Institute of Sport. Running for the Australian national team, she wears number 81.

Boden represented Australia at the 2012 Summer Olympics, where she made her Olympic debut in the 400 metre hurdle event as Australia's only competitor in the event.

=== 400 metre hurdles ===
Boden started competing in open age races when she was sixteen years old.

In 2005, Boden won the 400 metres hurdles event at the Australian national championships. She was the youngest person to win the event. She repeated her victory in the event at the 2007, 2008, 2010 and 2011 Australian national championships. Her personal best in the 400 metre hurdles is 55.25 seconds. That year she also competed in the World Youth Championships.

As a seventeen-year-old, Boden competed in the 400 metre hurdles event at the 2006 Commonwealth Games, but did not make the finals. She also competed but did not reach the final at the 2006 World Junior Championships. She competed in the event again in the 2010 Commonwealth Games where she finished fourth.

Boden competed at the World University Games in Bangkok in 2007, where she finished fourth in the qualifying round with a time of 58.72 seconds. At the 2009 edition in Belgrade, she finished fifth in the finals with a time of 56.81 seconds.

In 2011 she competed in her first senior World Championships, in Daegu, reaching the semifinal.

In February 2012, Boden clocked an A-standard Olympic qualifying time of 55.45 seconds at the Sydney Track Classic. Her (then) personal best time in the event was 55.25 seconds was set on 8 May 2010 in Osaka.

In 2013, she set a new personal best of 55.08 at Oordegem-Lede, and competed again at the world championships.

She competed in the 400 m hurdles at the 2014 Commonwealth Games and was part of the Australian 4 x 400 m team. She finished in 4th in both events.

She reached the World Championships again in 2015, the 2016 Olympics and the 2017 World Championship.

=== Long jump ===
In 2007, Boden competed in the long jump event at the Australian national championships, where she finished second with 6.39m with an illegal tailwind (+4.1 m/s). That same year, she competed at the World University Games in Bangkok where she finished sixth with a jump of 6.40 metres.

=== 400 metres ===
Boden beat her personal best time during a meet in Dormagen, Germany in the last weekend in June 2012. Her new personal best is 52.82. Her previous best time in the event was 53.51 seconds.
