= St John Bosco College, Engadine =

St John Bosco College

Location
- 95 Banksia Avenue, Engadine, New South Wales; Australia; 34°3′53.2″S 151°0′28.3″E

Information
- Former name: St John Bosco High School
- Type: Independent co-educational secondary day school
- Motto: Latin: Gaudium et Spes (Joy and Hope)
- Denomination: Roman Catholicism
- Patron saint: Saint John Bosco
- Founded: 1978; 48 years ago
- Educational authority: Sydney Catholic Schools
- Principal: Jennifer Fowler
- Years: 7–12
- Houses: Chisholm, Savio, Dunlea, Mackillop
- Colours: Green and white
- Feeder schools: Saint John Bosco Primary; Holy Cross Primary, Helensburgh
- Website: sjbcengadine.syd.catholic.edu.au

St John Bosco College is an independent systemic Roman Catholic co-educational secondary day school, located in Engadine, a southern suburb of Sydney, New South Wales, Australia.

The college was founded in 1978 under the name St John Bosco High School.

== History ==
St John Bosco High School was originally founded in 1978 at the initiative of the parishioners of St John Bosco Parish, Engadine, as a systemic Years 7 - 10 school under the administration of the Salesians of Don Bosco. The school was built after many years of planning and effort by the Parish Priest, John Briffa SDB, and a group of parishioners. The school's name was changed to St John Bosco College in 1998 when the first Year 11 students were enrolled. The first class to graduate from St John Bosco College was in 1999.

== Patron ==
The patron of the college is Saint John Bosco, an Italian saint from the 1800s who modelled his teaching methods on the practices of Saint Francis de Sales (therefore his pedagogy and charism are called Salesian).

== Notable alumni ==
- Emily Arthur – snowboarder
- Robbie Kearns – professional rugby league footballer
- Lindsay McDougall – musician and radio personality
- Maryanne Stuart – politician
- Sarah Walsh – Paralympic athlete
- Jackie O - Radio host

== See also ==
- List of Catholic schools in New South Wales
- Catholic education in Australia
