= Melissa Breen =

Australian sprinter (born 1990)

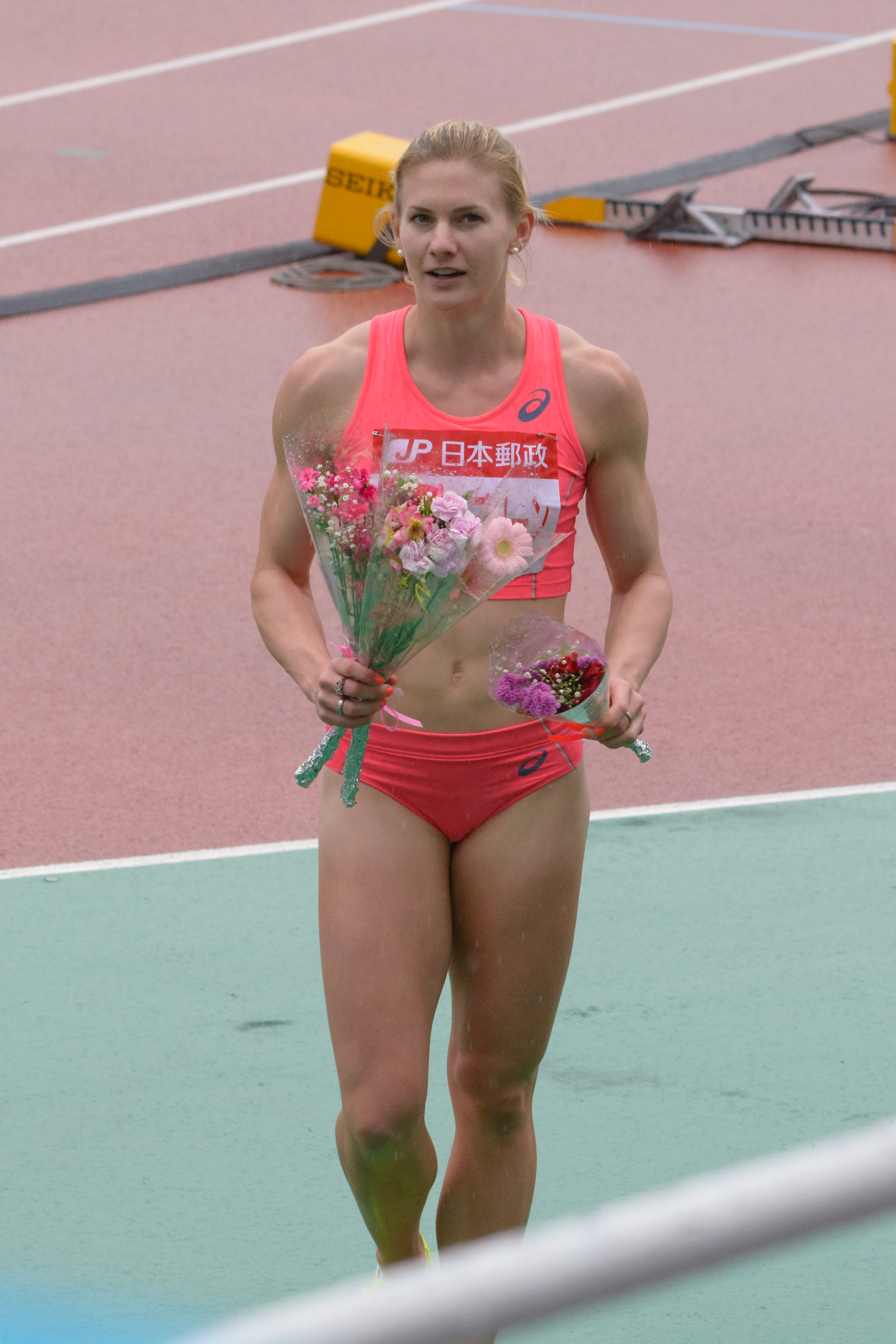
- Melissa Breen at "Mikio Oda Memorial", 2015, Hiroshima, Japan

Personal information
- Nationality: Australian
- Born: 17 September 1990 (age 36) Canberra, Australia
- Height: 1.74 m (5 ft 9 in)
- Weight: 67 kg (148 lb) (2018)

Sport
- Country: Australia
- Sport: Track and field
- Events: 100 metres 200 metres
- Club: Matt Beckenham

Melissa Breen (born 17 September 1990) is an Australian 100 metres and 200 metres runner. Breen broke the Australian record for the women's 100 m sprint, when she clocked 11.11 seconds at the ACT Championships, held on 9 Feb 2014 at the Australian Institute of Sport track in Canberra under ideal conditions with a 1.9 mps following wind, warm conditions and 600+ metres elevation. This broke a record previously held by Melinda Gainsford-Taylor, which had stood for more than 20 years.

Breen was selected to represent Australia at the 2012 Summer Olympics in the 100 m event. She has won the Australian national championships in the 100 m event in 2010, 2012, 2015 and 2016. She won the 200 m event at the national championships in 2009 and 2012. She represented Australia at the 2010 Commonwealth Games in the 100 m event, finishing fifth in the semi-finals. She was also selected in the 2014 Commonwealth Games in Glasgow, UK, and the subsequent 2018 Commonwealth Games on the Gold Coast, Australia.

in 2025, she was inducted into ACT Sport Hall of Fame as an Athlete Member.

== Early life ==
Breen was born on 17 September 1990 in the Australian Capital Territory. She attended Saint Anthony's Parish School in Wanniassa before going to St Mary MacKillop College, Canberra for high school. She had tertiary training at the Australian Vocational Training Academy from 2009 to 2010, where she earned two certificates. Amongst the certificates she holds are ones in a Certificate III in Fitness, Certificate IV in Fitness, First Aid Certificate, Level 3 Athletics Coach Event Group – Sprints and Relays, and Level One Strength and Conditioning. These qualifications enable her to coach athletics. She uses Twitter and writes a blog. As of 2012, she lives in Canberra.

Breen is 173 centimetres (68 in) tall and weighs 65 kilograms (143 lb).

== Athletics career ==
Breen is a 100 m and 200 m athletics specialist. She is a member of the Woden Harriers athletics club. Her training partner is Lauren Boden. She bases her Australian training in Canberra and her European training in Cologne, Germany. She is coached by Matt Beckenham. She was previously coached by Rob Wozniak from 2003 to 2006. She has been an ACT Academy of Sport scholarship holder. Her personal best time in the 100 m event is 11.11 seconds set on 9 February 2014 in Canberra. Her personal best time in the 200 m event is 23.12 seconds, set on 9 March 2013 in Sydney.

Breen has won the Australian national championships in the 100 m event in 2010 and 2012. She won the 200 m event at the national championships in 2009 and 2012. In the under 18 age group, she won the 100 m event in 2008 and the 200 m event in 2007. She finished third in the under 20 age in the 200 m event and first in the 100 m event in 2008. She competed at the 2010 Commonwealth Games, finishing fifth in the 100 m semifinal. She competed in the 100 m and 200 m events at a meet in the last weekend of June 2012 in Dormagen, Germany, winning the 100 m with a time of 11.38 seconds and the 200 m with a time of 23.73s. Her 100 m time was a personal best for the event at a competition in Europe. At the German competition, she had an opportunity to qualify for the Olympics in the 4 × 100 m relay, but she and Australia's other runners did not make the top 16.

=== 2012 Olympics ===
Breen was one of fifty-four track and field competitors chosen to represent Australia at the 2012 Summer Olympics. She was chosen by Athletics Australia, despite not having run an Olympic A qualifying time in her event, after having run the 100 m event 27 times in 2012 without Olympic A qualifying time and coming within 0.02 seconds of setting a time. The chairman of Athletics Australia justified her selection, saying "In the case of Melissa Breen, at our final selection meeting, like all eligible athletes, we took into account her season’s results and progression over the qualifying period. With multiple personal bests, an improved level of consistency in her performances and the fact that she is an emerging athlete in our sport, the selectors chose to identify her for nomination to the AOC." Breen was the only athletics competitor in Australia who was nominated who had not set an Olympic A qualifying time. She placed third from last in her first round heat in the 100 metres.

She competed at the 2014 and 2018 Commonwealth Games, reaching the semifinals. At the Rio Olympics she finished 7th in heat 7 in 11.74 seconds. She has also competed at the 2011, 2013 and 2015 World Championships.

=== 2014 Commonwealth Games ===
Breen competed in the 2014 Commonwealth Games in Glasgove, UK, in her pet events, the 100 metres, and, subsequently, the 4 x 100 metre relay. Glasgow Commonwealth Games Results from World Athletics:

Pl.	Discipline	Mark	Wind	Race	Competition	Venue	Date
5.	100 Metres	11.45	+0.1	SF1	Glasgow Commonwealth Games	Hampden Park, Glasgow (GBR)	28 JUL 2014
1.	100 Metres	11.54	-0.3	H2	Glasgow Commonwealth Games	Hampden Park, Glasgow (GBR)	27 JUL 2014

=== 2018 Commonwealth Games ===
Breen was selected for the 2018 Commonwealth Games on the Gold Coast where she competed in the 100 metres and the 4 x 100 metre relay. Gold Coast Commonwealth Games Results from World Athletics:

Pl.	Discipline	Mark	Wind	Race	Competition	Venue	Date
5.	100 Metres	11.76	-0.1	SF2	Gold Coast Commonwealth Games	Gold Coast (AUS)	08 APR 2018
4.	100 Metres	11.65	+2.1	H4	Gold Coast Commonwealth Games	Gold Coast (AUS)	08 APR 2018
