= Athletics at the 2008 Summer Paralympics – Women's long jump F12 =

The Women's Long Jump F12 had its Final held on September 14 at 9:20.

== Medalists ==
Gold	Oksana Zubkovska; Ukraine
Silver	Volha Zinkevich; Belarus
Bronze	Liu Miaomiao; China

== Results ==
Place	Athlete	1	2	3	4	5	6	Best
1	Oksana Zubkovska (UKR)	6.15	6.22	-	-	-	6.28	6.28 WR
2	Volha Zinkevich (BLR)	5.41	5.29	5.52	5.64	5.62	5.81	5.81
3	Liu Miaomiao (CHN)	5.74	5.54	5.69	5.66	5.59	5.27	5.74
4	Daineris Mijan (CUB)	5.33	5.43	5.48	5.64	5.57	5.71	5.71
5	Anna Kaniouk (BLR)	5.43	5.52	5.55	5.43	5.54	5.56	5.56
6	Marija Ivekovic (CRO)	5.52	5.54	5.44	5.45	5.35	5.51	5.54
7	Rosalia Lazaro (ESP)	5.39	5.52	x	x	5.33	5.47	5.52
8	Oxana Boturchuk (UKR)	5.12	5.14	5.27	4.96	5.28	5.14	5.28
9	Tanja Dragic (SRB)	5.05	5.07	5.00				5.07
10	Alla Jasim Al-Qaysu (IRQ)	5.01	5.00	-				5.01
11	Sara Martinez (ESP)	5.00	4.97	5.00				5.00
12	Hanah Ngendo Mwangi (KEN)	4.91	4.68	4.90				4.91
13	Svetlana Makeyeva (KAZ)	4.61	4.46	4.51				4.61
14	Radostina Ivanova (BUL)	2.13	-	-				2.13
