= Aleksandra Moguchaia =

Russian Paralympic athlete (born 1990)

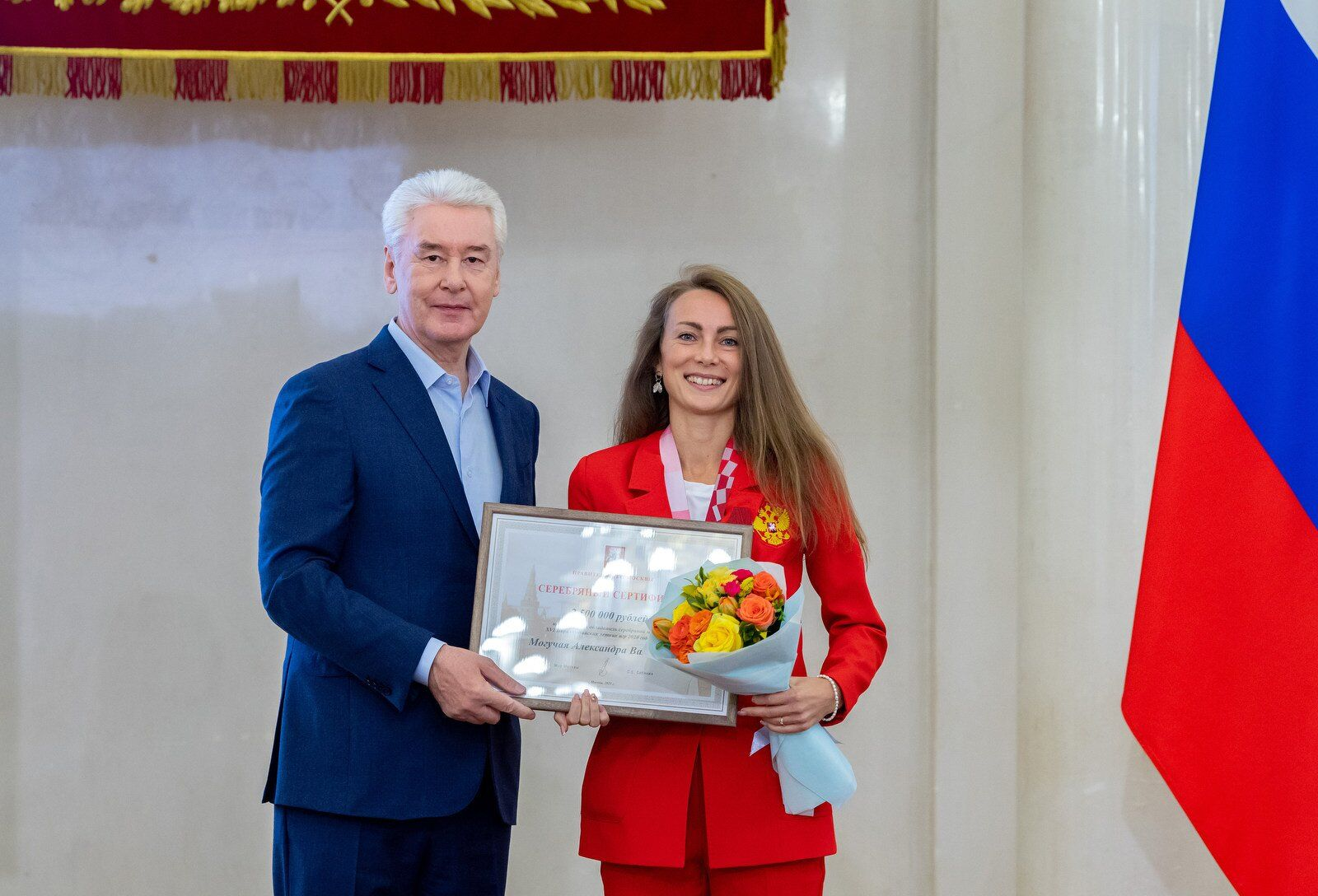

Personal information
- Nationality: Russian
- Born: 18 August 1990 (age 35) Severodvinsk, Russia

Sport
- Sport: Paralympic athletics
- Disability class: T46
- Event: Long jump
Medal record
Women's para-athletics
Representing RPC
Paralympic Games
Silver medal – second place	2020 Tokyo	long jump T47
Representing Russia
World Championships
Bronze medal – third place	2015 Doha	400 m T47
Bronze medal – third place	2019 Dubai	long jump T47
European Championships
Gold medal – first place	2016 Grosseto	long jump T47
Gold medal – first place	2021 Bydgoszcz	long jump T47
Silver medal – second place	2016 Grosseto	100 m T47

Aleksandra Moguchaia (born 18 August 1990) is a Russian para-athlete who represented Russia at the Paralympic Games.

== Career ==
Moguchaia made her international debut for Russia at the 2004 Summer Paralympics. Moguchaia represented Russian Paralympic Committee athletes at the 2020 Summer Paralympics in the long jump T47 event and won a silver medal.
