= Oksana Zubkovska =

Ukrainian Paralympic athlete

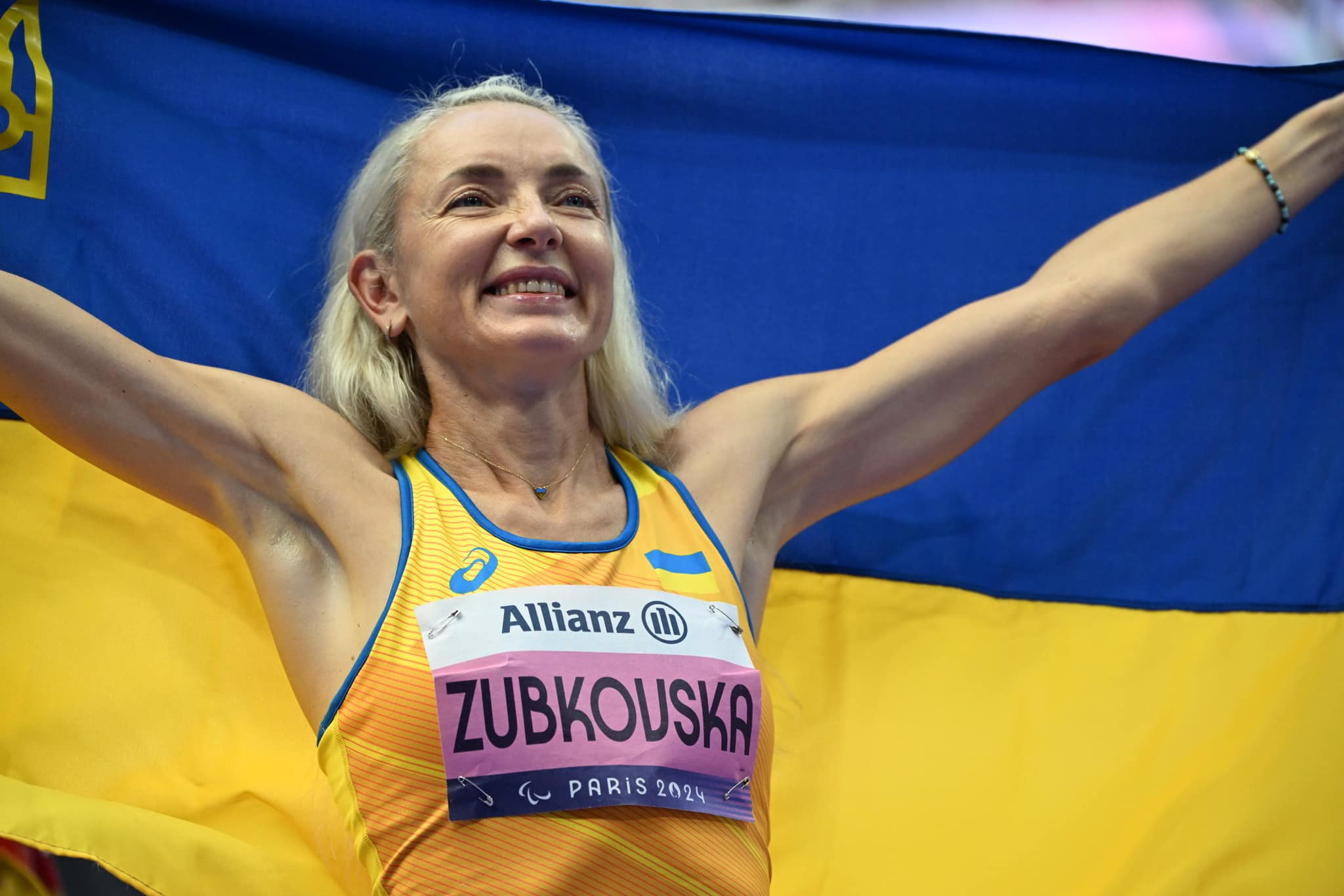
- Zubkovska at the 2024 Summer Paralympics

Personal information
- Native name: Оксана Зубковська
- Born: 15 July 1981 (age 45)
Medal record
Women's para athletics
Representing Ukraine
Paralympic Games
Gold medal – first place	2008 Beijing	Long jump F12
Gold medal – first place	2012 London	Long jump F11/12
Gold medal – first place	2016 Rio	Long jump T12
Gold medal – first place	2020 Tokyo	Long jump T12
Gold medal – first place	2024 Paris	Long jump T12
World Championships
Gold medal – first place	2013 Lyon	Long jump T12
Gold medal – first place	2015 Doha	Long jump T12
Gold medal – first place	2017 London	Long jump T12
Gold medal – first place	2019 Dubai	Long jump T12
Gold medal – first place	2023 Paris	Long jump T12
IBSA World Games
Gold medal – first place	2007 São Paulo	Long jump T12
Gold medal – first place	2011 Antalya	Long jump T12
European Championships
Gold medal – first place	2021 Bydgoszcz	Long jump T12
- Updated on 1 September 2024

Oksana Zubkovska (born 15 July 1981) is a Paralympian athlete from Ukraine competing mainly in category F12 long jump events. She won the gold medal in the women's long jump F12 event at the Summer Paralympics in 2008, 2012, 2016, 2020 and 2024.
