= Sarah Walsh (athlete) =

Australian Paralympic athlete (born 1998)

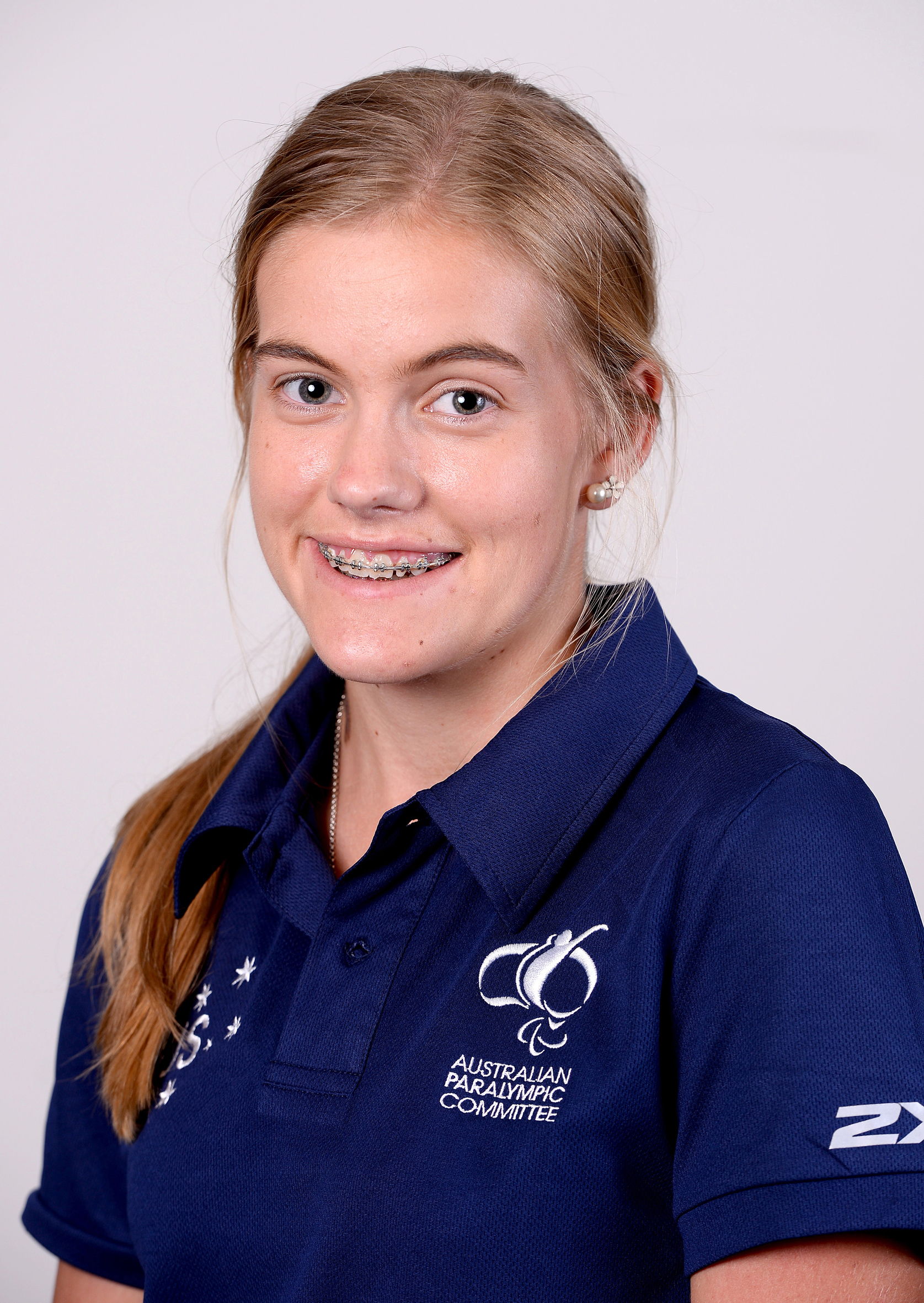
- 2016 Australian Paralympic team portrait

Personal information
- Born: 14 July 1998 (age 28) Sydney, New South Wales

Sport
- Club: Sutherland District Athletics Club
- Coached by: Matthew Beckenham
Medal record
Track and field (T64)
Representing Australia
World Para Athletics Championships
Bronze medal – third place	2019 Dubai	Long Jump T64

Sarah Walsh (born 14 July 1998) is an Australian Paralympic amputee athlete. She represented Australia at the 2016 Rio Paralympics, 2020 Tokyo Paralympics and the 2024 Paris Paralympics. .

== Personal ==
Walsh was born on 14 July 1998 in Sydney, New South Wales. She was born with fibular hemimelia and this led to her right leg being amputated below the knee when she was 18 months old. She attended St John Bosco College, Sydney.

== Athletics ==
Walsh was encouraged by a teacher to take up para-athletics at the age of nine. She then joined Helensburgh Little Athletics Club. She received her first prosthetic running blade at the age of 10 as a result of sponsorship from Otto Bock and the Appliance and Limb Centre. She is classified as a T64 athlete. She competed at the 2015 IPC Athletics World Championships in Doha where she finished sixth in the Women's Long Jump T44 and competed in the heats of the Women's 100m T44. In the 2016 Rio Paralympics she competed in the T44 Long jump and receiving a result of 4.82 which placed her 6th overall.

At the 2017 World Para Athletics Championships in London, England, she finished fourth in the Women's Long Jump T44 with a jump of 4.85m.

At the 2019 World Para Athletics Championships in Dubai, she won the bronze medal in the Women's Long Jump T64 with a leap of 5.20m.

At the 2020 Tokyo Paralympics, she finished seventh in the Women's Long Jump T64 with a jump of 5:11m. Walsh finished fifth place in the Women's Long Jump T64, leaping to a 4.84m (+0.2) at 2023 World Para Athletics Championships in Paris. At the 2024 World Para Athletics Championships in Kobe, she finished fourth in the Women's Long Jump T64 with a jump of 5.14m.

At the 2024 Paris Paralympics, she finished eight in the Women's Long jump T64 with a jump of 4.88m. At the 2025 World Para Athletics Championships in New Delhi, she finished fifth in the Women's Long Jump T64 with a jump of 5.14m (-0.9).

She is a member of the Sutherland District Athletics Club and coached by Matt Beckenham.
