= Monica Contrafatto =

Italian Paralympic athlete

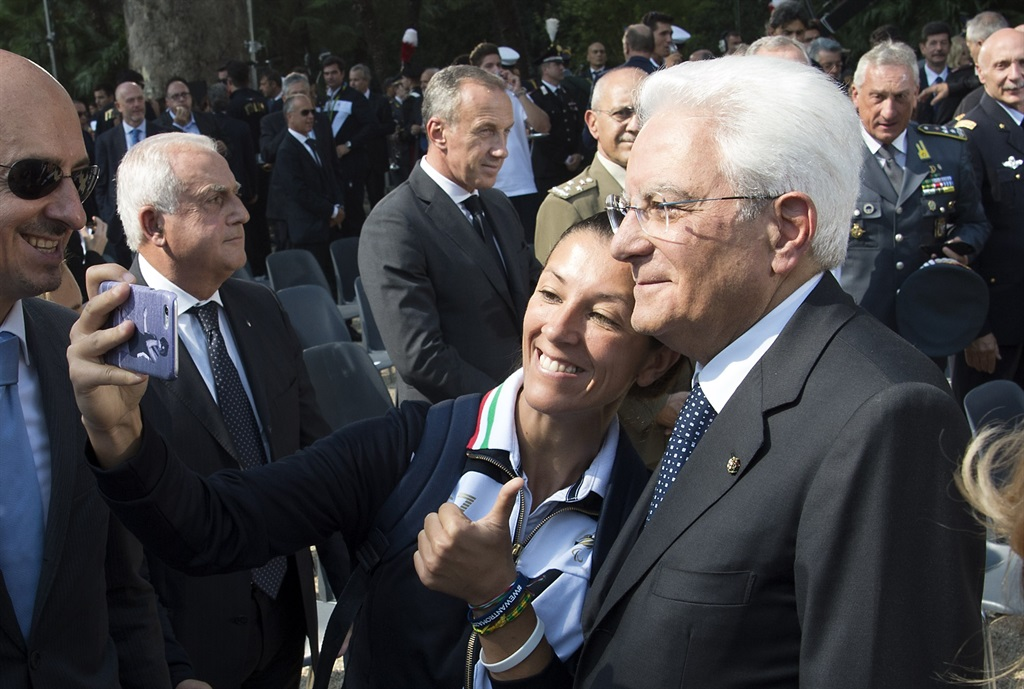
- Monica Contrafatto takes a selfie with the President of Italy Sergio Mattarella

Personal information
- Full name: Monica Graziana Contrafatto
- Nationality: Italian
- Born: 9 March 1981 (age 45) Gela, Italy

Sport
- Country: Italy
- Sport: Paralympic athletics
Medal record
Women's para athletics
Representing Italy
Event	1st	2nd	3rd
Paralympic Games	0	0	3
World Championships	0	2	1
European Championships	0	1	1
Total	0	3	5
Paralympic Games
Bronze medal – third place	2016 Rio de Janeiro	100 m T42
Bronze medal – third place	2020 Tokyo	100 m T63
Bronze medal – third place	2024 Paris	100 m T63
World Championships
Silver medal – second place	2017 London	100 m T42

Monica Graziana Contrafatto (born 9 March 1981 in Gela) is an Italian Paralympic athlete. She competed at the 2016 Summer Paralympics, in 100m T42, winning a bronze medal. She competed at the 2020 Summer Paralympics, in 100m T63.

== Biography ==
A soldier of the Italian Army's 1st Bersaglieri Regiment Contrafatto was injured on 24 March 2012, during a mortar attack on Forward Operating Base "Ice" in Gulistan District, Farah Province in Afghanistan. As a consequence of her injuries her right leg had to be amputated.

== Achievements ==
Year	Competition	Venue	Position	Event	Time	Notes
2016	Paralympics Games	(Brazil) Rio de Janeiro	3rd	100 m – T42	16.30	
2021	Paralympics Games	(Japan) Tokyo	3rd	100 m – T63	14.73	(Note: She ran her PB (14.72) in heats.)

== See also ==
- Italy at the 2016 Summer Paralympics
- Italy at the 2020 Summer Paralympics
