= Amy Watt =

Canadian-American long jumper (born 1997)

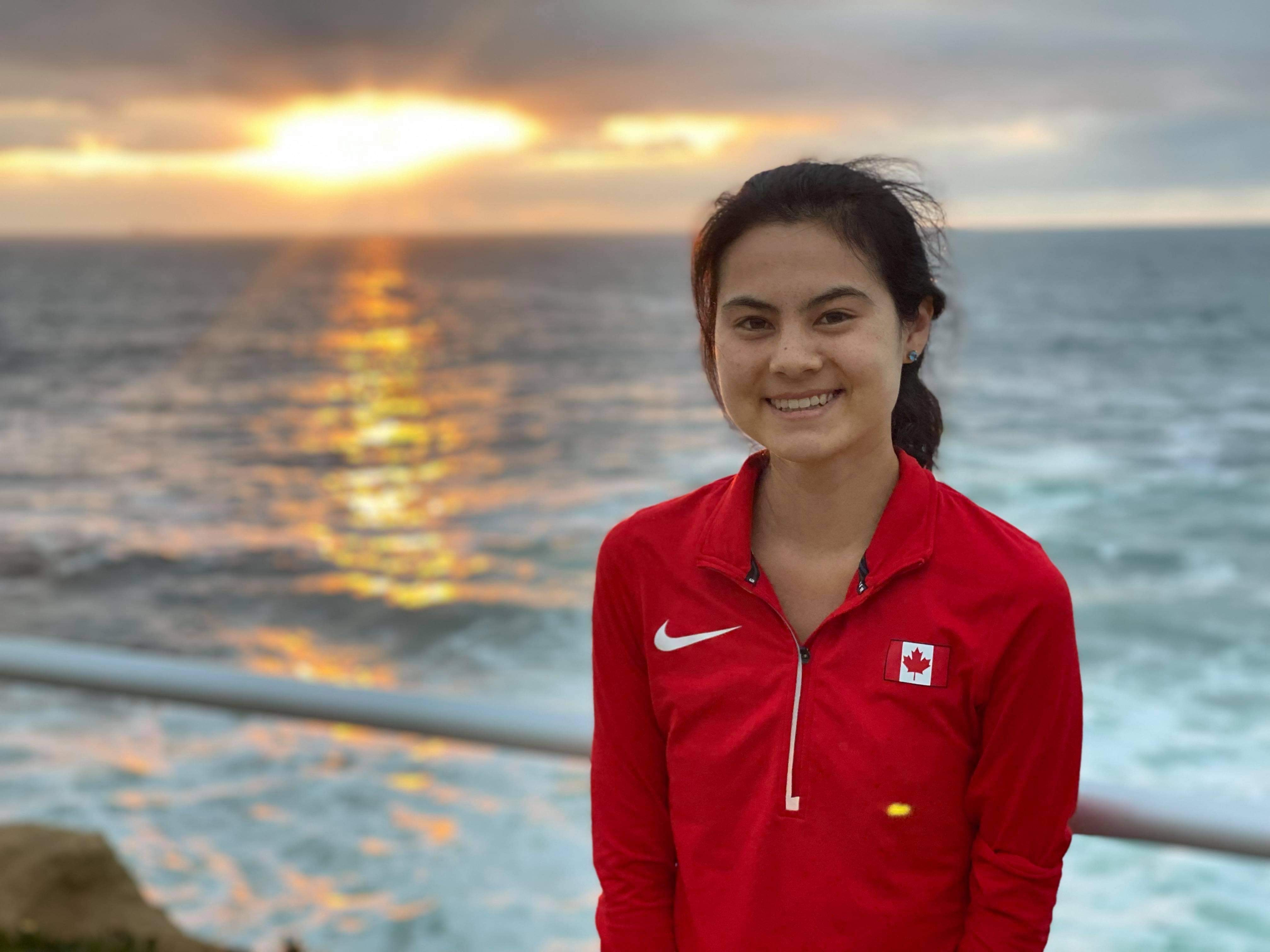

Personal information
- Born: December 16, 1997 (age 28) Palo Alto, California, United States
- Education: Pomona College

Sport
- Country: Canada; United States
- Sport: Paralympic athletics
- Disability class: T47
- Event: Long Jump

Achievements and titles
- Personal best: 5.35 metres (17.6 ft)
Medal record
Paralympic athletics
Representing Canada
World Championships
Parapan American Games

Amy Watt (born December 16, 1997) is a Canadian-American former Paralympic athlete who mainly competed in the long jump in international level events. She was born missing her left arm just below the elbow due to amniotic band syndrome. Watt competed for the United States at the 2016 Paralympic Games in Rio de Janeiro. She competed in the 2020 Summer Paralympics in Long jump T47 for Canada, placing fifth. Watt decided to retire from international Paralympic competitions after Tokyo 2020.

== Career ==
Watt holds United States and Canadian dual citizenship. She was born and raised in Palo Alto, California; and her father, Jeff, is from Canada. Watt competed at the 2015 Parapan American Games in Toronto, 2015 IPC World Championships in Doha, Qatar, and 2016 Summer Paralympics in Rio de Janeiro for the United States.

Watt competed at the 2019 Parapan American Games in Lima, Peru and 2019 IPC World Championships in Dubai for Canada.

Watt's first foray into elite paralympics competitions was at the 2015 US Paralympics Track and Field National Championships, where she placed first in long jump and 400m, second in 100m and 200m.

Watt attended Pomona College in Claremont, California. She took a couple of years break from international competitions to focus on her education before switching to compete for Canada in 2019. Watt graduated cum laude with a double major in mathematics and molecular biology and a minor in computer science in 2020. After graduation, Watt embarked on her professional career as a data scientist working for Meta. In 2023, she decided to pursue graduate studies full time at the University of Washington department of biostatistics.
