= Karolina Kucharczyk =

Polish Paralympic athlete (born 1991)

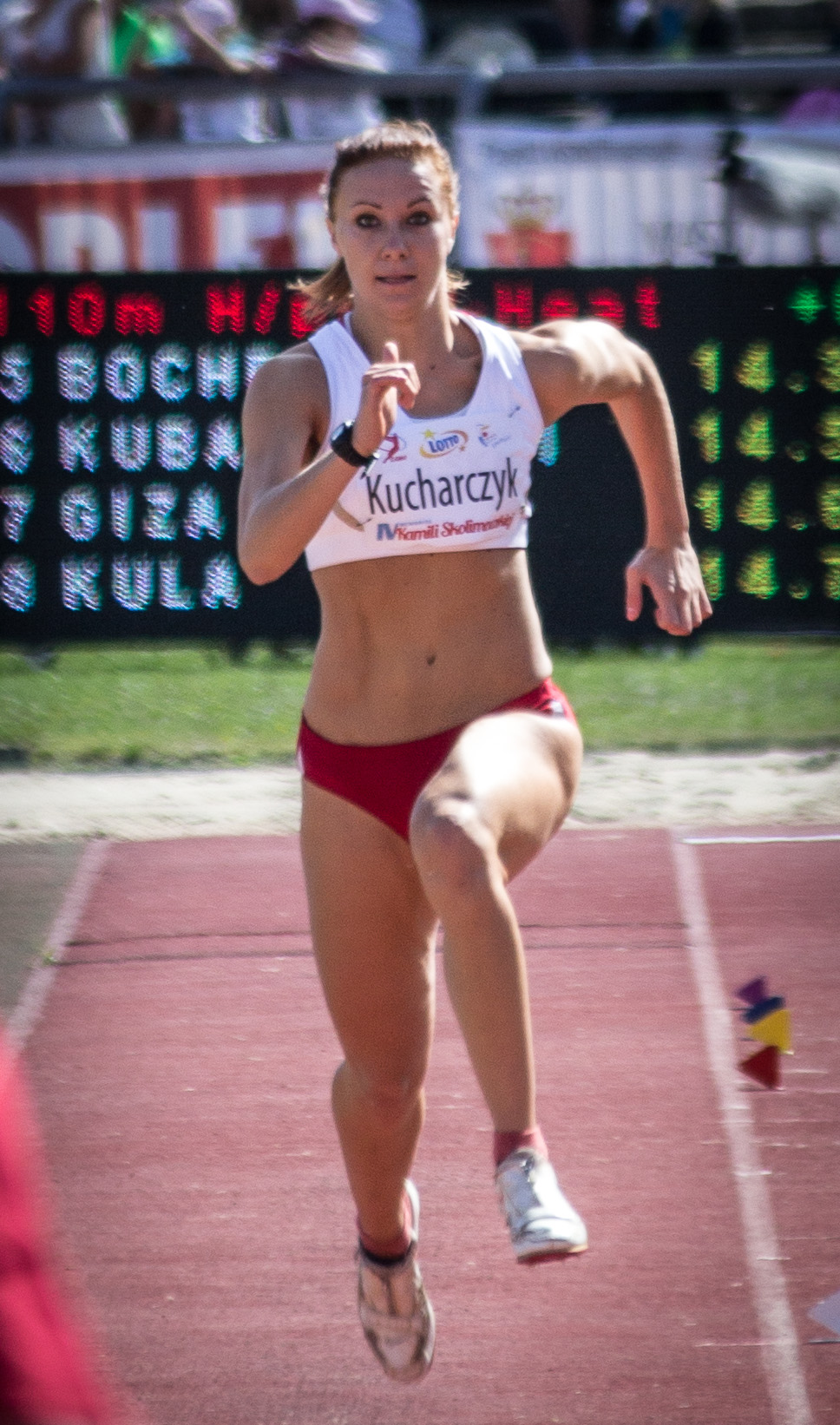
- Kucharczyk competing in 2013

Personal information
- Nationality: Polish
- Born: 24 April 1991 (age 35) Rawicz, Poland

Sport
- Sport: track and field
- Disability class: T20
- Event: long jump
- Club: UKS Achilles Leszno
- Coached by: Zbigniew Lewkowicz (national); Dariusz Gorski (club)
Medal record
Women's para-athletics
Representing Poland
Paralympic Games
Gold medal – first place	2012 London	Long jump F20
Gold medal – first place	2020 Tokyo	Long jump T20
Gold medal – first place	2024 Paris	Long jump T20
Silver medal – second place	2016 Rio de Janeiro	Long jump T20
World Championships
Gold medal – first place	2013 Lyon	Long jump T20
Gold medal – first place	2015 Doha	Long jump T20
Gold medal – first place	2019 Dubai	Long jump T20
Gold medal – first place	2023 Paris	Long jump T20
Silver medal – second place	2011 Christchurch	Long jump F20
Bronze medal – third place	2025 New Delhi	Long jump T20
European Championships
Gold medal – first place	2012 Stadskanaal	Long jump T20
Gold medal – first place	2016 Grosseto	Long jump T20

Karolina Kucharczyk (born 24 April 1991 in Rawicz) is a Polish Paralympic athlete who began in her sport at age twelve.

== Career ==
She won a gold medal for Poland at the 2012 Summer Paralympics in the Long Jump class F20. She broke her own record in doing so with a jump of 6.00m. She won a silver medal at the 2016 Summer Paralympics. She won a gold medal at the 2020 Summer Paralympics, in Women's long jump T20.

She competed at the 2011 World Championships, 2013 World Championships, 2015 World Championships, winning a gold medal, and 2019 World Championships.
