= Liu Miaomiao (athlete) =

Chinese Paralympic athlete (born 1989)

Personal information
- Born: 1989 (age 36–37)
Medal record
Paralympic athletics
Representing China
Paralympic Games
Bronze medal – third place	2008 Beijing	Long Jump - F12

Liu Miaomiao (Chinese: 刘苗苗; pinyin: Liú Miáomiáo; born 1989) is a Paralympian athlete from China competing mainly in category F12 long jump events.

She competed in the 2008 Summer Paralympics in Beijing, China. There she won a bronze medal in the women's F12 long jump event.
