= Chiaki Takada =

Japanese Paralympic athlete

Personal information
- Born: 1984 (age 41–42) Mitaka City, Japan

Sport
- Country: Japan
- Sport: Paralympic athletics
- Disability class: T11
- Events: 100 metres Long jump
- Coached by: Shigekazu Omori; Kumiko Ikeda
Medal record
Paralympic athletics
Representing Japan
World Championships
Silver medal – second place	2017 London	Long jump T11
Asian Para Games
Silver medal – second place	2018 Jakarta	Long jump T11

Chiaki Takada (born 1984) is a Japanese Paralympic athlete who competes in long jump at international track and field competitions, she is a former sprinter.

== Career ==
Takada trains with former Japanese Olympic sprinter Shigekazu Omori who is also her running guide and Olympic long jumper Kumiko Ikeda coaches her in the long jump.

=== Paralympics ===
She is a World silver medalist and has competed at the 2016 and 2020 Summer Paralympics.

=== World Championships ===
Takada won silver in the 2017 World Championships in London.

=== Asian Para Games ===
Takada won silver in the 2018 Asian Para Games in Jakarta.

== Family ==
Takada is married to Yuji Takada who is a three-time Deaflympics athlete who competes in 400 metre hurdles. They both met at the Japan Para Athletics Championships in 2006 then got married in 2008, they have a son together who was born in 2009.
