= Matthew Beckenham =

Australian hurdler

Personal information
- Nationality: Australian
- Born: 18 March 1976 (age 50) Narromine, Australia

Sport
- Sport: Track and field
- Event: 400 metres hurdles

Matthew Beckenham (born 18 March 1976) is an Australian hurdler. He competed in the men's 400 metres hurdles at the 2000 Summer Olympics.

He has coached Olympic athletes - Melissa Breen, Lauren Wells and Brendan Cole and Paralympic athletes - Sarah Walsh and Chad Perris.
