= Tomomi Tozawa =

Japanese para athlete (born 1999)

- Tozawa at the 2024 Summer Paralympics

Personal information
- Nationality: Japanese
- Born: 14 January 1999 (age 27) Tsukuba, Ibaraki, Japan

Sport
- Sport: Para athletics
- Disability class: T63
Medal record
Women's para athletics
Representing Japan
World Championships
Silver medal – second place	2024 Kobe	100 m T63
Silver medal – second place	2024 Kobe	Long jump T63
Bronze medal – third place	2019 Dubai	Long jump T63
Asian Para Games
Gold medal – first place	2026 Aichi–Nagoya	Long jump T63

Tomomi Tozawa (兎澤朋美, Tozawa Tomomi; born 14 January 1999) is a Japanese para athlete who specializes in the long jump. She represented Japan at the 2020 and 2024 Summer Paralympics.

== Career ==
In November 2019, Tozawa competed at the 2019 World Para Athletics Championships and won a bronze medal in the long jump T63 event with a jump of 4.33 metres. She was subsequently selected to represent Japan at the 2020 Summer Paralympics. During her Paralympics debut she finished in fourth place in the long jump T63 event with a jump of 4.39 metres.

In May 2024, she competed at the 2024 World Para Athletics Championships and won a silver medal in the 100 metres T63 event. She also won a silver medal in the long jump T63 event. In September 2024, she represented Japan at the 2024 Summer Paralympics and finished in fifth place in the long jump T63 event with a jump of 4.58 metres.

She again competed at the 2025 World Para Athletics Championships and finished in fifth place in the long jump T63 event with a jump of 4.77 metres.

In October 2026, she competed at the 2026 Asian Para Games and won a gold medal in the long jump T63 event.

== Personal life ==
In the fifth grade of elementary school, she was diagnosed with osteosarcoma, which resulted in the amputation of her left leg from the thigh down.
