= Elena Kratter =

Swiss Paralympic athlete (born 1996)

Personal information
- Nationality: Swiss
- Born: 5 July 1996 (age 29) St. Gallen, Switzerland

Sport
- Sport: Paralympic athletics
- Disability class: T63
- Event: Long jump
Medal record
Women's para-athletics
Representing Switzerland
Paralympic Games
Bronze medal – third place	2020 Tokyo	Long jump T63
Bronze medal – third place	2024 Paris	Long jump T63
World Championships
Silver medal – second place	2023 Paris	Long jump T63
Silver medal – second place	2025 New Delhi	Long jump T63
European Championships
Silver medal – second place	2021 Bydgoszcz	Long jump T63
Silver medal – second place	2021 Bydgoszcz	100 m T63

Elena Kratter (born 5 July 1996) is a Swiss para-athlete who specializes in long jump. She represented Switzerland at the 2020 and 2024 Summer Paralympics

== Career ==
Kratter competed at the 2019 World Para Alpine Skiing Championships and switched to para-athletics after sustaining a knee injury while skiing.

Kratter represented Switzerland at the 2020 Summer Paralympics in the long jump T63 event and won a bronze medal.
