= Gitte Haenen =

Belgian Paralympic athlete (born 1986)

Personal information
- Born: 23 March 1986 (age 40) Mortsel, Belgium
- Height: 1.70 m (5 ft 7 in)
- Weight: 60 kg (132 lb)

Sport
- Country: Belgium
- Sport: Paralympic athletics
- Disability class: T63
- Event(s): 100 metres Long jump
- Club: KAA Ghent
- Coached by: Mieke van Thuyne
Medal record
Paralympic athletics
Representing Belgium
World Championships
| Silver medal – second place | 2019 Dubai | Women's long jump T63 |
| Bronze medal – third place | 2019 Dubai | Women's 100m T63 |
European Championships
| Silver medal – second place | 2018 Berlin | Women's long jump T63 |
| Bronze medal – third place | 2018 Berlin | Women's 100m T63 |

Gitte Haenen (born 23 March 1986) is a Belgian Paralympic athlete who competes in 100 metres and long jump events in international level events. She is also a former paratriathlete and Thai boxer competing in an elite level.

In 2010, Haenen was involved in an accident in a Thai boxing training session. She was accidentally kicked in the left knee which tore her anterior cruciate ligament and had to have many operations and rehabilitation, however, in 2014, her left knee worsened and Haenen suffered with chronic pain and nerve damage and was prescribed morphine for her injury. She was forced to give up boxing and her left leg was amputated above the knee in March 2016.
