= Desirée Vila Bargiela =

Spanish Paralympic athlete

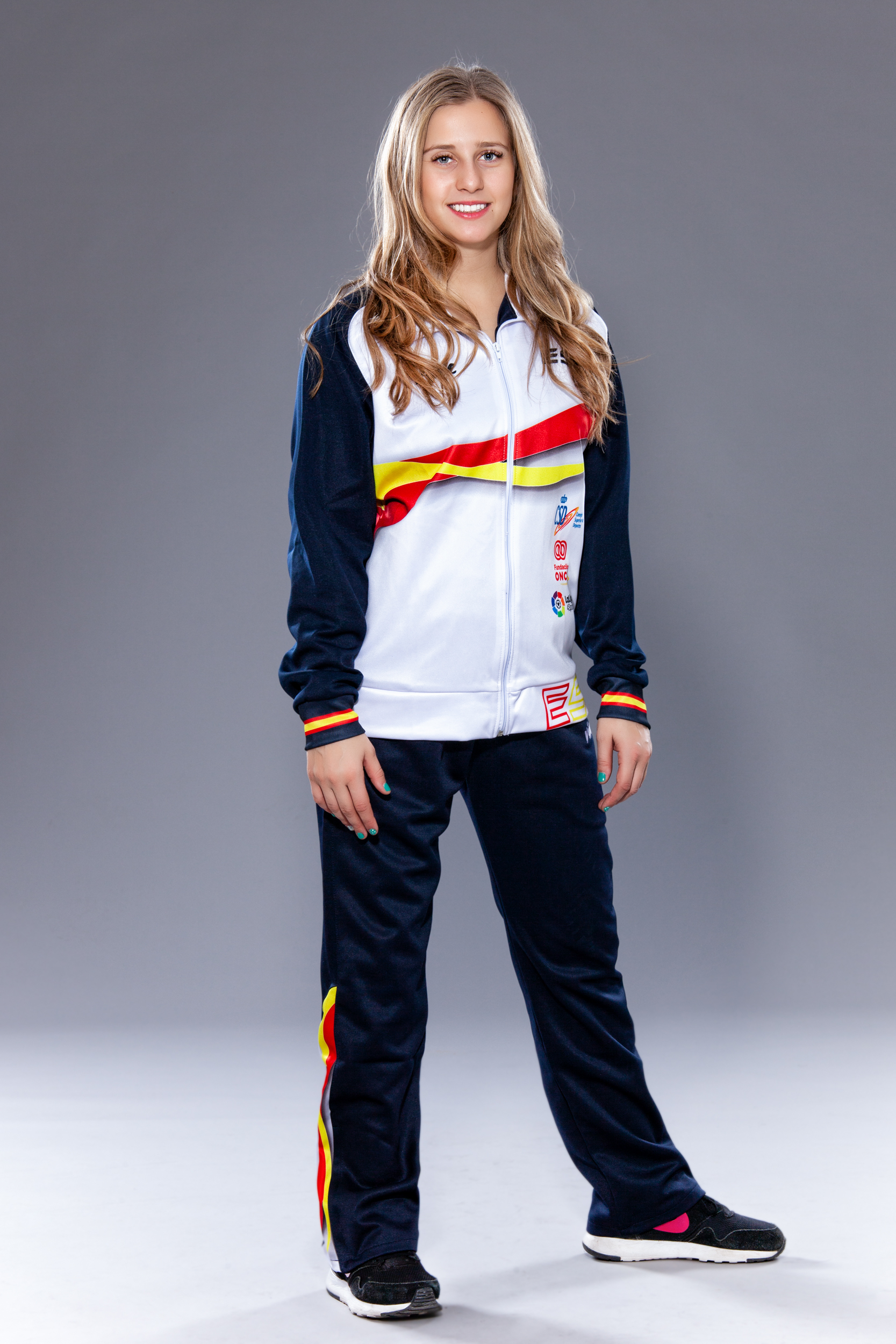

Personal information
- Born: 15 June 1998 (age 27) Gondomar, Spain
- Home town: Vigo, Spain
- Height: 1.58 m (5 ft 2 in)

Sport
- Country: Spain
- Sport: Paralympic athletics
- Disability class: T63

Desirée Vila Bargiela (born 15 June 1998) is a Paralympic athlete and former acrobatic gymnast who competes in international level events.

== Sport accident ==
On 26 February 2015, Vila was doing gymnastics practice at the 2015 European Acrobatic Gymnastics Championships and broke her right tibia and fibula and compressing her popliteal artery, which resulted in her right leg being amputated above the knee and was forced to quit the sport after only being a professional acrobatic gymnast for three years prior to her injury. Her family filed a lawsuit for medical negligence against the doctor and the hospital where Vila was treated, the doctor was sentenced to two years in prison and received a four-year suspension, the family were given a €2 million compensation. However, in 2019, the doctor's jail sentence and suspension were revoked and the compensation was reduced.

== Paralympic athletics career ==
Vila took up Paralympic athletics at the age of nineteen after being encouraged by a friend. She competed for her country at the World Para Athletics European Championships and the World Para Athletics Championships where she competed in sprinting and long jump events.

She ends at sixth place in the women's long jump of the 2018 World Para Athletics European Championships in Berlin. Her highest achievement is ending at third place in the women's long jump of the 2021 World Para Athletics European Championships.
