= Ambra Sabatini =

Italian Paralympic athlete

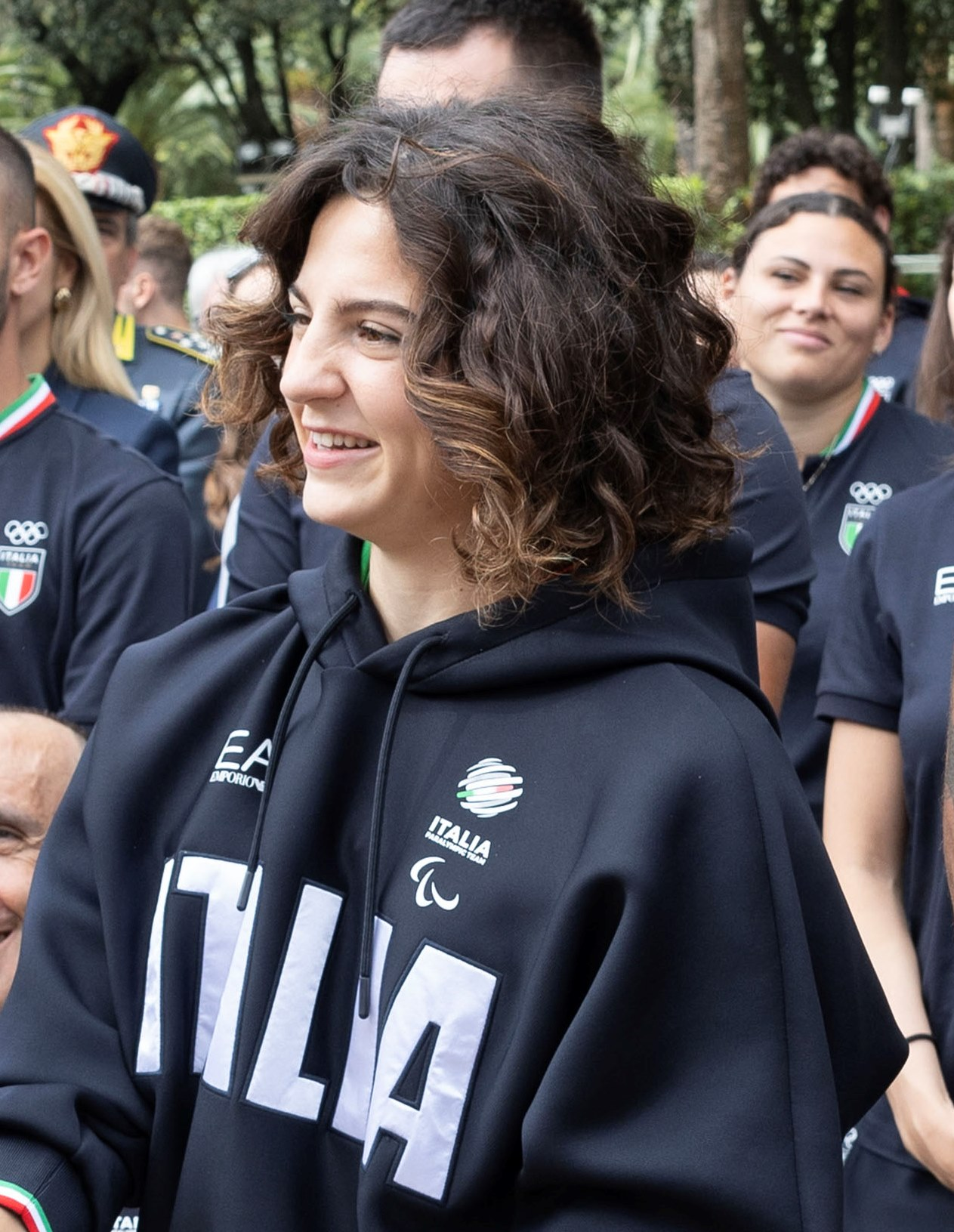
- Sabatini in 2024.

Personal information
- Nationality: Italian
- Born: 19 January 2002 (age 24) Livorno, Italy

Sport
- Sport: Paralympic athletics
- Disability class: T63
- Event: Sprints
- Club: Atletica Grosseto (2019–21); G.S. Fiamme Gialle (since 2021)
- Coached by: Jacopo Boscherini

Achievements and titles
- Personal bests: 100 m: 13.98 (2023) WR
Medal record
Women's para athletics
Representing Italy
Event	1st	2nd	3rd
Paralympic Games	1	0	0
World Championships	2	0	0
Total	3	0	0
Paralympic Games
Gold medal – first place	2020 Tokyo	100 m T63
World Championships
Gold medal – first place	2023 Paris	100 m T63
Gold medal – first place	2025 New Delhi	100 m T63

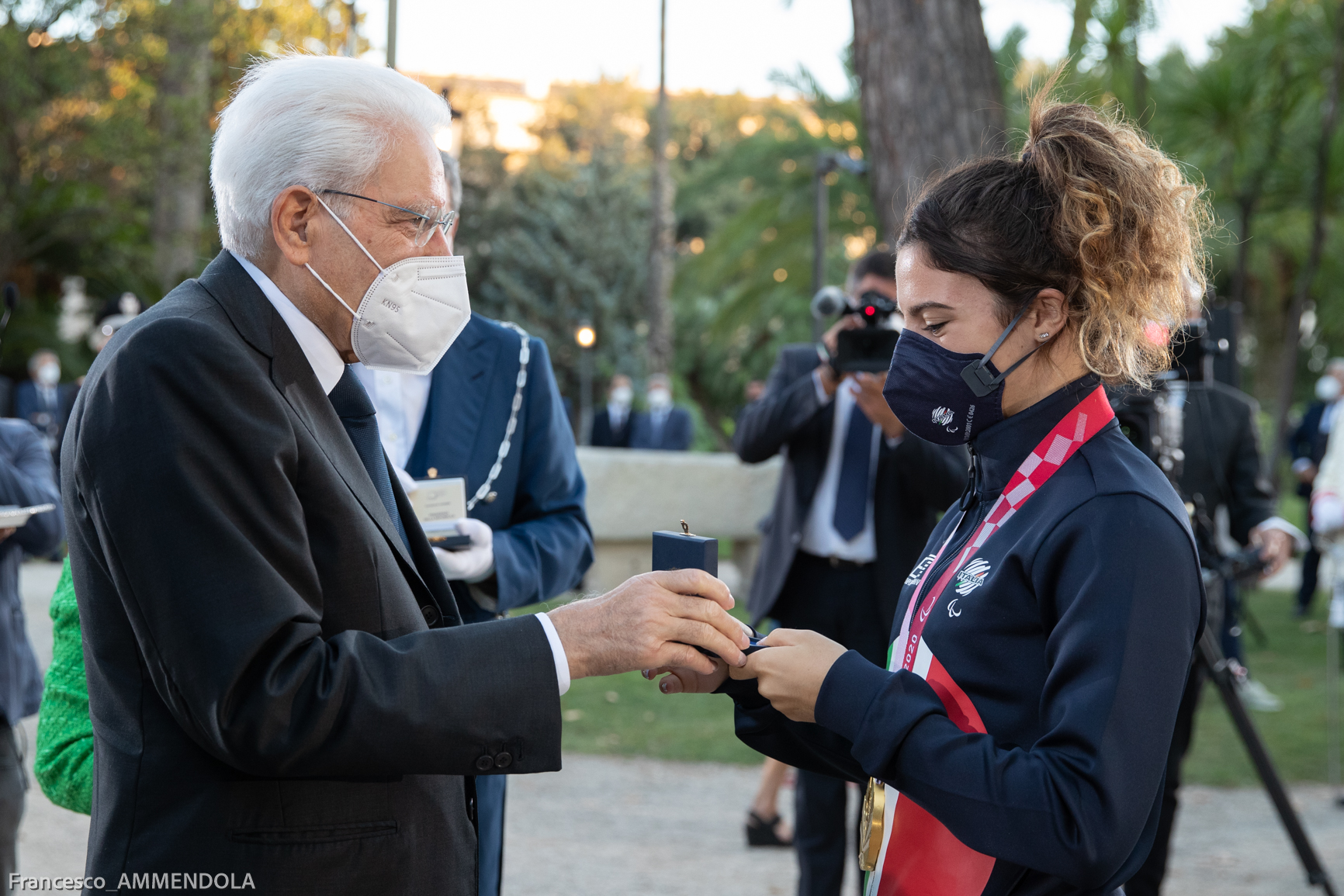
Sabatini awarded by Sergio Mattarella at Quirinale in 2021.

Ambra Sabatini (born 19 January 2002) is an Italian Paralympic athlete.

She competed at the Dubai 2021 Paralympic World Cup, setting a world record.

== The accident ==
On 5 June 2019, while on her way to an athletics training, Ambra had a road crash as a passenger on the scooter driven by her father. Their vehicle was hit by a truck and as a result of the injuries sustained, Ambra suffered the amputation of her left leg above the knee.

== World records ==
- 100 m T63: 13.98 ( (France) Paris, 13 July 2023) - current holder

== Achievements ==
=== Track ===
Year	Competition	Venue	Position	Event	Notes
2021	Summer Paralympics	Tokyo, Japan	1st	100 m	14.11 s
2023	World Championships	Paris, France	1st	100 m	13.98 s
2025	World Championships	New Delhi, India	1st	100 m	14.39 s

== See also ==
- List of IPC world records in athletics
