= Viktoria Karlsson =

Swedish Paralympic athlete

Personal information
- Nickname: Vickan
- Born: 27 January 1997 (age 29) Söderhamn, Sweden
- Home town: Gothenburg, Sweden
- Height: 179 cm (5 ft 10 in)
- Weight: 65 kg (143 lb)

Sport
- Country: Sweden
- Sport: Para athletics
- Disability: Eye cancer
- Disability class: T11
- Event: Long jump
- Club: Gothenburg KIK
- Coached by: Jeremy Pryce
Medal record
Para athletics
Representing Sweden
World Championships
Bronze medal – third place	2015 Doha	Women's long jump T11
European Championships
Gold medal – first place	2014 Swansea	Women's long jump T11
Gold medal – first place	2016 Grosseto	Women's long jump T11
Gold medal – first place	2018 Berlin	Women's long jump T11
Silver medal – second place	2012 Stadskanaal	Women's long jump T11

Viktoria Karlsson (born 27 January 1997) is a blind Swedish Paralympic athlete who competes in long jump events in international level events. She was a former para cross-country skier who competed in international level.

== Life ==
Karlsson was born in 1997 in Soderhamn. By the time she was five she had lost her eyesight due to cancer which started when she was eighteen months old. In 2004 she became a long jumper after she got involved in athletics because the parents thought she would benefit. She won a gold medal at the 2014 IPC Athletics European Championships.

In 2016 Jeremy Pryce became her coach and she joined the Goteborgs KIK club. Two years later she was competing in the T11 category in Berlin where she won another gold medal after being Sweden's flag bearer at the 2018 European Championships.

The following year she tried Para cross-country skiing.

In 2020 she was supported financially by a campaign which raised money from Swedes who bought a particular pillow. The money was shared between judoka Nicolina Pernheim, cyclist Louise Jannering and Karlsson in order that they could fund guides prior to the postponed 2020 Summer Paralympics in Tokyo. Karlsson's guide is Sofia Sandgren.

Karlsson's best jump is 4.56 metres which is a Swedish record.
