= Marta Piotrowska =

Polish Paralympic athlete (born 1991)

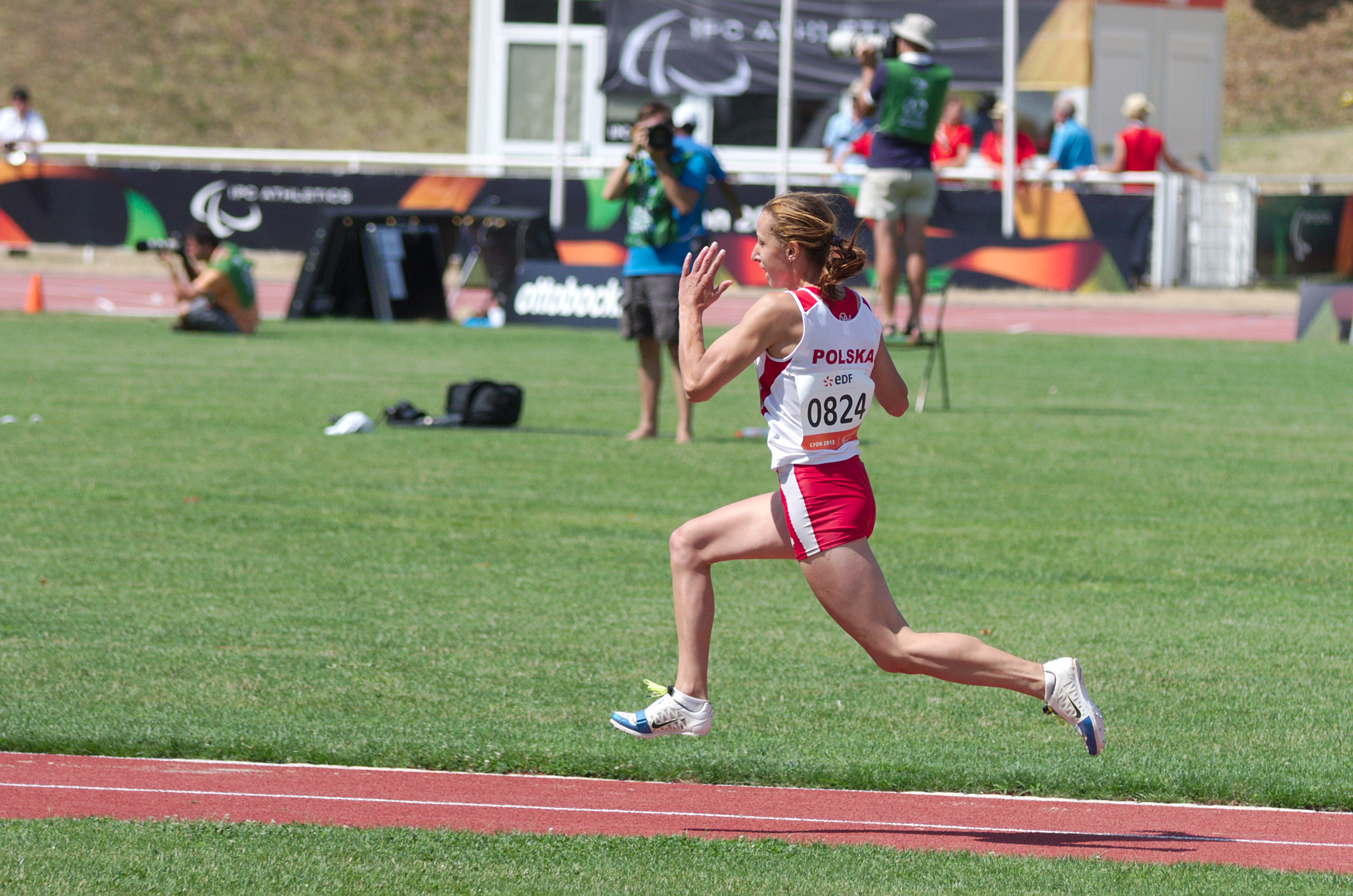

Personal information
- Born: 29 December 1991 (age 34) Zduńska Wola, Poland
- Height: 1.62 m (5 ft 4 in)
- Spouse: Pawel Piotrowski

Sport
- Country: Poland
- Sport: Paralympic athletics
- Disability: Cerebral palsy
- Disability class: T37
- Coached by: Tomasz Kus
Medal record
Paralympic athletics
Representing Poland
World Championships
Silver medal – second place	2011 Christchurch	Women's long jump F38
Bronze medal – third place	2017 London	Women's long jump T37
Bronze medal – third place	2019 Dubai	Women's long jump T37
European Championships
Gold medal – first place	2018 Berlin	Women's long jump T37

Marta Piotrowska née Langner (born 29 December 1991) is a Polish Paralympic athlete who competes in 100 metres, 200 metres and long jump events in international level events.
