= Commonwealth Games record progression in track cycling =

Improvement of event performance over time

This is an overview of the progression of the Commonwealth Games track cycling records, maintained by the CGF.

== Men's records ==
=== Flying 200 m time trial ===
Time	Cyclists	Location	Track	Date	Competition	Ref
10.145	(Australia) Sean Eadie	(England) Manchester	Indoor track	30 July 2002	2002 Commonwealth Games	
10.058	(Australia) Shane Perkins	(India) Delhi	Indoor track	6 October 2010	2010 Commonwealth Games	
9.779	(Australia) Matthew Glaetzer	(Scotland) Glasgow	Indoor track	24 July 2014	2014 Commonwealth Games	
9.583	(Australia) Matthew Glaetzer	(Australia) Brisbane	Indoor track	7 April 2018	2018 Commonwealth Games	
9.445	(Trinidad and Tobago) Nicholas Paul	(England) London	Indoor track	31 July 2022	2022 Commonwealth Games	
9.361	(Australia) Leigh Hoffman	(Scotland) Glasgow	Indoor track	1 August 2026	2026 Commonwealth Games	

=== 1 km time trial ===
Time	Cyclists	Location	Track	Date	Competition	Ref
1:01.726	(Scotland) Chris Hoy	(England) Manchester	Indoor track	28 July 2002	2002 Commonwealth Games	
1:01.411	(Australia) Scott Sunderland	(India) Delhi	Indoor track	5 October 2010	2010 Commonwealth Games	
1:00.675	(Australia) Scott Sunderland	(Scotland) Glasgow	Indoor track	26 July 2014	2014 Commonwealth Games	
59.340	(Australia) Matthew Glaetzer	(Australia) Brisbane	Indoor track	8 April 2018	2018 Commonwealth Games	
58.530	(Australia) Leigh Hoffman	(Scotland) Glasgow	Indoor track	2 August 2026	2026 Commonwealth Games	

=== Team sprint ===
Time	Cyclists	Location	Track	Date	Competition	Ref
45.192	England; Jason Queally; Andy Slater; Jamie Staff	(England) Manchester	Indoor track	2 August 2002	2002 Commonwealth Games	
44.506	Australia; Sean Eadie; Jobie Dajka; Ryan Bayley	(England) Manchester	Indoor track	2 August 2002	2002 Commonwealth Games	
44.265	Scotland; Ross Edgar; Chris Hoy; Craig MacLean	(Australia) Melbourne	Indoor track	19 March 2006	2006 Commonwealth Games	
43.772	Australia; Dan Ellis; Jason Niblett; Scott Sunderland	(India) Dehli	Indoor track	8 October 2010	2010 Commonwealth Games	
43.254	New Zealand; Eddie Dawkins; Ethan Mitchell; Sam Webster	(Scotland) Glasgow	Indoor track	24 July 2014	2014 Commonwealth Games	
43.181	New Zealand; Eddie Dawkins; Ethan Mitchell; Sam Webster	(Scotland) Glasgow	Indoor track	24 July 2014	2014 Commonwealth Games	
42.822	New Zealand; Ethan Mitchell; Eddie Dawkins; Sam Webster	(Australia) Brisbane	Indoor track	5 April 2018	2018 Commonwealth Games	
42.222	Australia; Leigh Hoffman; Matthew Richardson; Matthew Glaetzer	(England) London	Indoor track	29 July 2022	2022 Commonwealth Games	
42.040	Australia; Matthew Glaetzer; Leigh Hoffman; Matthew Richardson	(England) London	Indoor track	29 July 2022	2022 Commonwealth Games	

=== 4000 m individual pursuit ===
Time	Cyclists	Location	Track	Date	Competition	Ref
4:19.967	(Australia) Luke Roberts	(England) Manchester	Indoor track	30 July 2002	2002 Commonwealth Games	
4:18.194	(Australia) Bradley McGee	(England) Manchester	Indoor track	31 July 2002	2002 Commonwealth Games	
4:16.358	(Australia) Bradley McGee	(England) Manchester	Indoor track	31 July 2002	2002 Commonwealth Games	
4:14.845	(Australia) Jack Bobridge	(India) Delhi	Indoor track	5 October 2010	2010 Commonwealth Games	
4:11.455	(England) Charlie Tanfield	(Australia) Brisbane	Indoor track	6 April 2018	2018 Commonwealth Games	
4:07.129	(New Zealand) Aaron Gate	(England) London	Indoor track	30 July 2022	2022 Commonwealth Games	
4:04.132	(Australia) Oliver Bleddyn	(Scotland) Glasgow	Indoor track	31 July 2026	2026 Commonwealth Games	
4:03.898	(Australia) Oliver Bleddyn	(Scotland) Glasgow	Indoor track	31 July 2026	2026 Commonwealth Games	

=== 4000 m team pursuit ===
Time	Cyclists	Location	Track	Date	Competition	Ref
4:04.034	Australia; Graeme Brown; Peter Dawson; Mark Renshaw; Stephen Wooldridge	(England) Manchester	Indoor track	31 July 2002	2002 Commonwealth Games	
3:59.583	Australia; Graeme Brown; Peter Dawson; Mark Renshaw; Luke Roberts	(England) Manchester	Indoor track	1 August 2002	2002 Commonwealth Games	
3:55.421	Australia; Jack Bobridge; Michael Freiberg; Cameron Meyer; Dale Parker	(India) Dehli	Indoor track	7 October 2010	2010 Commonwealth Games	
3:54.851	Australia; Jack Bobridge; Luke Davison; Alex Edmondson; Glenn O'Shea	(Scotland) Glasgow	Indoor track	24 July 2014	2014 Commonwealth Games	
3:52.041	Australia; Leigh Howard; Jordan Kerby; Alex Porter; Sam Welsford	(Australia) Brisbane	Indoor track	5 April 2018	2018 Commonwealth Games	
3:49.804	Australia; Leigh Howard; Sam Welsford; Kelland O'Brien; Alex Porter	(Australia) Brisbane	Indoor track	5 April 2018	2018 Commonwealth Games	
3:47.575	New Zealand; Aaron Gate; Jordan Kerby; Tom Sexton; Campbell Stewart	(England) London	Indoor track	29 July 2022	2022 Commonwealth Games	
3:47.092	England; Henry Hobbs; Charlie Tanfield; William Tidball; Ethan Vernon	(Scotland) Glasgow	Indoor track	30 July 2026	2026 Commonwealth Games	

== Women's records ==
=== Flying 200 m time trial ===
Time	Cyclists	Location	Track	Date	Competition	Ref
11.452	(Canada) Lori-Ann Muenzer	(England) Manchester	Indoor track	31 July 2002	2002 Commonwealth Games	
11.275	(England) Victoria Pendleton	(Australia) Melbourne	Indoor track	18 March 2006	2006 Commonwealth Games	
11.140	(Australia) Anna Meares	(India) Delhi	Indoor track	5 October 2010	2010 Commonwealth Games	
10.984	(Australia) Stephanie Morton	(Scotland) Glasgow	Indoor track	26 July 2014	2014 Commonwealth Games	
10.524	(Australia) Stephanie Morton	(Australia) Brisbane	Indoor track	6 April 2018	2018 Commonwealth Games	
10.322	(Wales) Emma Finucane	(Scotland) Glasgow	Indoor track	31 July 2026	2026 Commonwealth Games	

=== 500 m time trial ===
Time	Cyclists	Location	Track	Date	Competition	Ref
35.084	(Australia) Kerrie Meares	(England) Manchester	Indoor track	28 July 2002	2002 Commonwealth Games	
34.326	(Australia) Anna Meares	(Australia) Melbourne	Indoor track	16 March 2006	2006 Commonwealth Games	
33.758	(Australia) Anna Meares	(India) Delhi	Indoor track	5 October 2010	2010 Commonwealth Games	
33.435	(Australia) Anna Meares	(Scotland) Glasgow	Indoor track	24 July 2014	2014 Commonwealth Games	
33.234	(Australia) Kristina Clonan	(England) London	Indoor track	31 July 2022	2022 Commonwealth Games	

=== 1 km time trial ===
Time	Cyclists	Location	Track	Date	Competition	Ref
1:05.285	(Wales) Emma Finucane	(Scotland) Glasgow	Indoor track	1 August 2026	2026 Commonwealth Games	

=== Team sprint (500 m) ===
Time	Cyclists	Location	Track	Date	Competition	Ref
34.115	Australia; Kaarle McCulloch; Anna Meares	(India) Delhi	Indoor track	6 October 2010	2010 Commonwealth Games	
33.811	Australia; Kaarle McCulloch; Anna Meares	(India) Delhi	Indoor track	6 October 2010	2010 Commonwealth Games	
32.578	Australia; Kaarle McCulloch; Stephanie Morton	(Australia) Brisbane	Indoor track	5 April 2018	2018 Commonwealth Games	
32.488	Australia; Kaarle McCulloch; Stephanie Morton	(Australia) Brisbane	Indoor track	5 April 2018	2018 Commonwealth Games	

=== Team sprint (750 m) ===
Time	Cyclists	Location	Track	Date	Competition	Ref
47.841	New Zealand; Rebecca Petch; Olivia King; Ellesse Andrews	(England) London	Indoor track	29 July 2022	2022 Commonwealth Games	
47.425	New Zealand; Ellesse Andrews; Olivia King; Rebecca Petch	(England) London	Indoor track	29 July 2022	2022 Commonwealth Games	
46.972	Wales; Rhian Edmunds; Emma Finucane; Lowri Thomas	(Scotland) Glasgow	Indoor track	30 July 2026	2026 Commonwealth Games	
46.760	Wales; Rhian Edmunds; Emma Finucane; Lowri Thomas	(Scotland) Glasgow	Indoor track	30 July 2026	2026 Commonwealth Games	

=== 3000 m individual pursuit ===
Time	Cyclists	Location	Track	Date	Competition	Ref
3:32.504	(New Zealand) Sarah Ulmer	(England) Manchester	Indoor track	1 August 2002	2002 Commonwealth Games	
3:32.467	(New Zealand) Sarah Ulmer	(England) Manchester	Indoor track	2 August 2002	2002 Commonwealth Games	
3:30.290	(Australia) Katie Mactier	(Australia) Melbourne	Indoor track	19 March 2006	2006 Commonwealth Games	
3:29.038	(England) Joanna Rowsell	(Scotland) Glasgow	Indoor track	25 July 2014	2014 Commonwealth Games	
3:24.119	(Scotland) Katie Archibald	(Australia) Brisbane	Indoor track	6 April 2018	2018 Commonwealth Games	
3:19.836	(New Zealand) Bryony Botha	(England) London	Indoor track	30 July 2022	2022 Commonwealth Games	
3:18.456	(New Zealand) Bryony Botha	(England) London	Indoor track	30 July 2022	2022 Commonwealth Games	

=== 4000 m individual pursuit ===
Time	Cyclists	Location	Track	Date	Competition	Ref
4:25.719	(England) Josie Knight	(Scotland) Glasgow	Indoor track	31 July 2026	2026 Commonwealth Games	
4:24.272	(Wales) Anna Morris	(Scotland) Glasgow	Indoor track	31 July 2026	2026 Commonwealth Games	

=== 4000 m team pursuit ===
Time	Cyclists	Location	Track	Date	Competition	Ref
4:17.218	Australia; Alexandra Manly; Annette Edmondson; Ashlee Ankudinoff; Amy Cure	(Australia) Brisbane	Indoor track	5 April 2018	2018 Commonwealth Games	
4:15.214	Australia; Alexandra Manly; Annette Edmondson; Ashlee Ankudinoff; Amy Cure	(Australia) Brisbane	Indoor track	5 April 2018	2018 Commonwealth Games	
4:14.605	Australia; Georgia Baker; Sophie Edwards; Chloe Moran; Maeve Plouffe	(England) London	Indoor track	29 July 2022	2022 Commonwealth Games	
4:12.234	Australia; Georgia Baker; Sophie Edwards; Chloe Moran; Maeve Plouffe	(England) London	Indoor track	29 July 2022	2022 Commonwealth Games	
4:10.658	Australia; Georgia Baker; Claudia Marcks; Alyssa Polites; Felicity Wilson-Haffenden	(Scotland) Glasgow	Indoor track	30 July 2026	2026 Commonwealth Games	

== See also ==
- Commonwealth Games records
