= Track cycling at the 2026 Commonwealth Games – Women's elimination race =

Cycling Track – Women's elimination race at the 2026 Commonwealth Games
- Venue: Sir Chris Hoy Velodrome
- Dates: 2 August

Medalists
gold medal	Alyssa Polites	Australia
silver medal	Georgia Baker	Australia
bronze medal	Maggie Coles-Lyster	Canada

The women's elimination race at the 2026 Commonwealth Games was part of the cycling programme, and took place on 2 August 2026.

== Schedule ==
The schedule is as follows:

All times are British Summer Time (UTC+1)

Date	Time	Round
Friday 2 August 2026	15:00	Finals

== Results ==
Rank	Riders
1	Alyssa Polites (AUS)
2	Georgia Baker (AUS)
3	Maggie Coles-Lyster (CAN)
4	Madelaine Leech (ENG)
5	Ally Wollaston (NZL)
6	Anna Morris (WAL)
7	Erin Boothman (SCO)
8	Carys Lloyd (WAL)
9	Sophie Edwards (AUS)
10	Samantha Donnelly (NZL)
11	Jessica Roberts (WAL)
12	Prudence Fowler (NZL)
13	Abi Miller (ENG)
14	Erin Creighton (NIR)
15	Kate Richardson (SCO)
16	Valencia Tan (SGP)
17	Neah Evans (SCO)
18	Alexandra Volstad (CAN)
19	Sophie Lewis (ENG)
20	Elizabeth Le Min Liau (SGP)
21	Esther Wong (NIR)
22	S'annara Grove (RSA)
DNS	Emma Jeffers (NIR)
