= Track cycling at the 2026 Commonwealth Games – Women's points race =

Cycling Track – Women's points race at the 2026 Commonwealth Games
- Venue: Sir Chris Hoy Velodrome
- Dates: 1 August
- Winning time: 66

Medalists
gold medal	Anna Morris	Wales
silver medal	Jessica Roberts	Wales
bronze medal	Georgia Baker	Australia

The women's points race at the 2026 Commonwealth Games was part of the cycling programme, and took place on 1 August 2026.

== Schedule ==
The schedule is as follows:

All times are British Summer Time (UTC+1)

Date	Time	Round
Saturday 1 August 2026	15:55	Final

== Results ==
=== Final ===
100 laps (25 km) were raced with 10 sprints.

Rank	Rider	Lap points	Sprint points	Total points
1st place, gold medalist(s)	Anna Morris (WAL)	40	26	66
2nd place, silver medalist(s)	Jessica Roberts (WAL)	40	12	52
3rd place, bronze medalist(s)	Georgia Baker (AUS)	40	11	51
4	Ally Wollaston (NZL)	20	27	47
5	Josie Knight (ENG)	40	2	42
6	Erin Boothman (SCO)	40	0	40
7	Maggie Coles-Lyster (CAN)	20	10	30
8	Bryony Botha (NZL)	20	5	25
9	Emily Shearman (NZL)	20	3	23
10	Madelaine Leech (ENG)	20	3	3
11	Elizabeth Liau (SGP)	20	0	20
12	Alyssa Polites (AUS)		8	8
13	Sophie Edwards (AUS)		3	3
14	Kate Richardson (SCO)		3	3
15	Valencia Tan (SGP)		2	2
16	S'annara Grove (RSA)		2	2
17	Alexandra Volstad (CAN)		1	1
18	Emma Jeffers (NIR)			0
19	Erin Creighton (NIR)			0
20	Grace Lister (ENG)			0
21	Esther Wong (NIR)			0
	Neah Evans (SCO)	-40		DNF
	Carys Lloyd (WAL)	-20	3	DNF
