= Track cycling at the 2026 Commonwealth Games – Women's scratch race =

Cycling Track – Women's scratch race at the 2026 Commonwealth Games
- Venue: Sir Chris Hoy Velodrome
- Dates: 31 July

Medalists
gold medal	Georgia Baker	Australia
silver medal	Samantha Donnelly	New Zealand
bronze medal	Erin Boothman	Scotland

The women's scratch race at the 2026 Commonwealth Games was part of the cycling programme, and took place on 31 July 2026.

== Schedule ==
The schedule is as follows:

All times are British Summer Time (UTC+1)

Date	Time	Round
Friday 31 July 2026	17:56	Finals

== Results ==
=== Final ===
40 laps (10 km) were raced.

Rank	Riders	Laps down
1	Georgia Baker (AUS)	
2	Samantha Donnelly (NZL)	
3	Erin Boothman (SCO)	
4	Abi Miller (ENG)	
5	Anna Morris (WAL)	
6	Maggie Coles-Lyster (CAN)	
7	Madelaine Leech (ENG)	
8	Alexandra Volstad (CAN)	
9	Kate Richardson (SCO)	
10	Erin Creighton (NIR)	
11	Emma Jeffers (NIR)	
12	Alyssa Polites (AUS)	
13	S'annara Grove (RSA)	
14	Sophie Lewis (ENG)	
15	Elizabeth Liau (SGP)	
16	Prudence Fowler (NZL)	
17	Neah Evans (SCO)	
18	Ally Wollaston (NZL)	
19	Esther Wong (NIR)	
20	Carys Lloyd (WAL)	
21	Megan Barker (WAL)	
22	Valencia Tan (SGP)	
23	Sophie Edwards (AUS)	
