= List of Australian records in track cycling =

Australian Athletic Records

The following are the national records in track cycling in Australia maintained by Australia's national cycling federation: Cycling Australia.

== Men ==
Key to tables: Awaiting ratification Record not kept by Cycling Australia Not ratified or later rescinded by the Cycling Australia

Event	Record	Athlete	Date	Meet	Place	Ref
Flying 200m time trial	9.091	Matthew Richardson	7 August 2024	Olympic Games	Saint-Quentin-en-Yvelines, France	
250m time trial (standing start)	16.886	Leigh Hoffman	6 August 2024	Olympic Games	Saint-Quentin-en-Yvelines, France	
1km time trial	58.526	Matthew Glaetzer	8 August 2023	World Championships	Glasgow, United Kingdom	
1 km time trial (sea level)	58.526	Matthew Glaetzer	8 August 2023	World Championships	Glasgow, United Kingdom	
Team sprint	41.597	Matthew Glaetzer; Leigh Hoffman; Matthew Richardson	6 August 2024	Olympic Games	Saint-Quentin-en-Yvelines, France	
4000m individual pursuit	4:03.898	Oliver Bleddyn	31 July 2026	Commonwealth Games	Glasgow, United Kingdom	
4000m team pursuit	3:40.730	Oliver Bleddyn; Sam Welsford; Conor Leahy; Kelland O'Brien	6 August 2024	Olympic Games	Saint-Quentin-en-Yvelines, France	
Hour record	52.491 km	Rohan Dennis	8 February 2015		Grenchen, Switzerland	

== Women ==
Event	Record	Athlete	Date	Meet	Place	Ref
Flying 200m time trial	10.310	Kristina Clonan	9 August 2024	Olympic Games	Saint-Quentin-en-Yvelines, France	
250m time trial (standing start)	18.415	Anna Meares	4 April 2012	World Championships	Melbourne, Australia	
500m time trial	32.836	Anna Meares	6 December 2013	World Cup	Aguascalientes, Mexico	
500m time trial (sea level)	32.911	Kristina Clonan	14 May 2022	Nations Cup	Milton, Canada	
1 km time trial	1:05.607	Claudia Marcks	1 August 2026	Commonwealth Games	Glasgow, United Kingdom	
Team sprint (500 m)	32.255	Kaarle McCulloch; Stephanie Morton	27 February 2019	World Championships	Pruszków, Poland	
Team sprint (750 m)	46.453	Alessia McCaig; Molly McGill; Kristine Perkins	22 October 2025	World Championships	Santiago, Chile	
3000m individual pursuit	3:19.994	Maeve Plouffe	5 February 2022		Adelaide, Australia	
4000m individual pursuit	4:32.651	Sophie Edwards	25 March 2026	Australian Championships	Brisbane, Australia	
3000m team pursuit	3:16.935	Annette Edmondson; Melissa Hoskins; Josephine Tomic	4 August 2012	Olympic Games	London, United Kingdom	
4000m team pursuit	4:08.612	Georgia Baker; Sophie Edwards; Chloe Moran; Maeve Plouffe	6 August 2024	Olympic Games	Saint-Quentin-en-Yvelines, France	
Hour record	46.882 km	Bridie O'Donnell	22 January 2016		Adelaide, Australia	
