= Track cycling at the 2026 Commonwealth Games – Women's individual pursuit =

Cycling Track – Women's individual pursuit at the 2026 Commonwealth Games
- Venue: Sir Chris Hoy Velodrome
- Dates: 31 July
- Winning time: 4:24.272

Medalists
gold medal	Anna Morris	Wales
silver medal	Josie Knight	England
bronze medal	Erin Boothman	Scotland

The women's individual pursuit at the 2026 Commonwealth Games was part of the cycling programme, and took place on 31 July 2026.

== Records ==
Prior to this competition, the existing world and Games records were as follows:

World record	(England) Josie Knight	4:19.461	Konya Velodrome, Konya	4 February 2026

== Schedule ==
The schedule is as follows:

All times are British Summer Time (UTC+1)

Date	Time	Round
Friday 31 July 2026	10:30	Qualifying
Friday 31 July 2026	16:33 / 16:40	Finals

== Results ==
=== Qualifying ===
The two fastest riders advanced to the gold medal final. The next two fastest riders advanced to the bronze medal final.

Rank	Riders	Time	Behind	Notes
1	Josie Knight (ENG)	4:25.719	—	QG, GR
2	Anna Morris (WAL)	4:25.817	+0.098	QG
3	Erin Boothman (SCO)	4:31.551	+5.832	QB
4	Bryony Botha (NZL)	4:32.548	+6.829	QB
5	Claudia Marcks (AUS)	4:32.811	+7.092	
6	Ciara Oliva (WAL)	4:33.504	+7.785	
7	Emily Shearman (NZL)	4:35.688	+9.969	
8	Grace Lister (ENG)	4:37.937	+12.218	
9	Maggie Coles-Lyster (CAN)	4:38.485	+12.766	
10	Jessica Roberts (WAL)	4:40.519	+14.800	
11	Esther Wong (NIR)	4:46.298	+20.579	
12	Alexandra Volstad (CAN)	4:46.830	+21.111	
13	Monica Jelimo Kiplagat (KEN)	5:46.416	+1:20.697	
14	Kendra Masiga Tabu (KEN)	5:48.371	+1:22.652	
15	Josette Umi Kiarie (KEN)	6:17.360	+1:51.641	
16	Erica Sezdro (GHA)	7:15.853	+2:50.134	
	Sophie Edwards (AUS)	DSQ		
	Felicity Wilson-Haffenden (AUS)	DSQ		

=== Finals ===
Rank	Nation	Time	Gap	Notes
Gold medal final
1st place, gold medalist(s)	Anna Morris (WAL)	4:24.272	—	GR
2nd place, silver medalist(s)	Josie Knight (ENG)	4:30.413	+6.141	
Bronze medal final
3rd place, bronze medalist(s)	Erin Boothman (SCO)	4:30.251	—	
4	Bryony Botha (NZL)	4:31.496	+1.245	
