= Northern Ireland at the 2026 Commonwealth Games =

- Flag of Northern Ireland
- CG code: NIR
- CGA: Northern Ireland Commonwealth Games Council
- Website: www.teamni.org

in Glasgow, Scotland 23 July 2026 – 2 August 2026
- Competitors: 65 in 8 sports
- Flag bearer (opening): Gary Kelly
- Baton bearer: Bethany Firth
- Flag bearer (closing): Adam McKeown
- Medals Ranked 12th: Gold 3 Silver 4 Bronze 9 Total 16

Commonwealth Games appearances (overview)
- 1934; 1938; 1950; 1954; 1958; 1962; 1966; 1970; 1974; 1978; 1982; 1986; 1990; 1994; 1998; 2002; 2006; 2010; 2014; 2018; 2022; 2026; 2030

Other related appearances
- Ireland (1930)

Northern Ireland will compete at the 2026 Commonwealth Games in Glasgow between 23 July and 2 August 2026. It will be Northern Ireland's twenty-first appearance.

The team from Northern Ireland consisted of 65 athletes. Bowler Gary Kelly was the country's flagbearer during the opening ceremony. Meanwhile, para swimmer Bethany Firth was the baton bearer during the opening ceremony.

== Competitors ==
The following is the list of number of competitors participating at the Games per sport/discipline.

Sport	Men	Women	Total
Artistic gymnastics	4	0	4
Athletics	3	3	6
Bowls	2	2	4
Boxing	7	5	12
Judo	2	1	3
Netball	—N/a	12	12
Swimming	7	8	15
Track cycling	2	3	5
Weightlifting	2	2	4
Total	29	36	65

== Medalists ==
Medal	Name	Sport	Event	Date
Gold	Kate O'Connor	Athletics	Women's heptathlon	29 July
Gold	Jon McConnell	Boxing	Men's 70 kg	1 August
Gold	Gary Kelly; Adam McKeown	Bowls	Men's pairs	2 August
Silver	Barry McClements	Swimming	Men's 100 metre backstroke S9	26 July
Silver	Daniel Wiffen	Swimming	Men's 1500 metre freestyle	29 July
Silver	Michaela Walsh	Boxing	Women's 57kg	1 August
Silver	Kaci Rock	Boxing	Women's 65kg	1 August
Bronze	Bethany Firth	Swimming	Women's 200 metre freestyle S14	25 July
Bronze	Chloe Wilson; Shauna O'Neill	Bowls	Women's pairs	28 July
Bronze	Gary Kelly	Bowls	Men's singles	28 July
Bronze	Ellie McCartney	Swimming	Women's 200 metre breaststroke	29 July
Bronze	Willie John McCartan	Boxing	Men's +90 kg	31 July
Bronze	Garyn McAllister	Boxing	Men's 90 kg	31 July
Bronze	Jude Gallagher	Boxing	Men's 60kg	31 July
Bronze	Rachael Hawkes	Judo	Women's 70kg	1 August
Bronze	Joshua Green	Judo	Men's 73kg	1 August

== Athletics ==
Men

Track events

Athlete	Event	Heat		Semifinal		Final	
Athlete	Event	Result	Rank	Result	Rank	Result	Rank
James Gormley	Mile	4:04.40	10	—N/a		Did not advance	
Nick Griggs	5000 metres	—N/a				13:25.84	6
Callum Morgan	5000 metres	—N/a				13:39.02	15

Women

Track events

Athlete	Event	Semifinal		Final	
Athlete	Event	Result	Rank	Result	Rank
Eva Walsh Dann	100 metres (T38)	14.18	5	Did not advance	

Field events

Athlete	Event	Qualification		Final	
Athlete	Event	Distance	Rank	Distance	Rank
Eva Walsh Dann	Long jump (T38)	—N/a		NM	

Combined events – Heptathlon

Athlete	Event	100H	HJ	SP	200 m	LJ	JT	800 m	Final	Rank
Kate O'Connor	Heptathlon	13.54	1.82	12.85	24.14	6.37	52.85 GHB	2:10.45 GHB	6569	1st place, gold medalist(s)
Kate O'Connor	Heptathlon	1044	1003	717	967	965	915	958	6569	1st place, gold medalist(s)
Anna McCauley	Heptathlon	13.70 PB	1.73	12.13	24.55	6.23 PB	36.99	2:10.86	5994	8
Anna McCauley	Heptathlon	1021	891	670	929	921	610	952	5994	8

== Boxing ==
Commonwealth Games Northern Ireland announced a team of twelve boxers for the Games on 11 May 2026.

Men

Athlete	Event	Round of 32	Round of 16	Quarterfinals	Semifinals	Final	
Athlete	Event	Opposition Result	Opposition Result	Opposition Result	Opposition Result	Opposition Result	Rank
Louis Rooney	55 kg	Seholoholo (LES); L KO	Did not advance				
Jude Gallagher	60 kg	bye	Ullah (PAK); W 4–0	Albert Ngulube (ZAM); W 3–2	Tryagain Ndevelo (NAM); L 2–3	—	3rd place, bronze medalist(s)
John Paul Hale	65 kg	bye	Mughalzai (ENG); L 0–5	Did not advance			
Jon McConnell	70 kg	bye	Sumit (IND); W 4–1	Carl Hield (BAH); W WO	Sonny Kerr (SCO); W 5–0	Orlando Holley-Sotomi (WAL) –	1st place, gold medalist(s)
Eoghan Quinn	80 kg	bye	Micock (SEY); L 1–4	Did not advance			
Garyn McAllister	90 kg	—	bye	Muntari (GHA); W 5–0	Connor Williams (WAL); L 0–5	—	3rd place, bronze medalist(s)
Willie John McCartan	+90 kg	—		Plange (GHA); W 5–0	Damar Thomas (ENG); L WO	—	3rd place, bronze medalist(s)

Women

Athlete	Event	Round of 16	Quarterfinals	Semifinals	Final	
Athlete	Event	Opposition Result	Opposition Result	Opposition Result	Opposition Result	Rank
Caitlin Fryers	51 kg	Ferdous (BAN); W 5–0	Sakshi Chaudhary (IND); L 0–5	Did not advance		
Nicole Clyde	54 kg	Bamfo (GHA); W 5–0	Preeti Pawar (IND); L 0–5	Did not advance		
Michaela Walsh	57 kg	bye	Brown (SCO); W 5–0	Jasmine Duamakanakana (FIJ); W 5–0	Jaismine Lamboria (IND) –	2nd place, silver medalist(s)
Kaci Rock	65 kg	—	Pasene (NIU); W 5–0	Caitlin Rainey (SCO); W 3–2	Sacha Hickey (ENG) –	2nd place, silver medalist(s)
Janseen Hill	70 kg	—	Reid (ENG); L 0–5	Did not advance		

== Bowls ==
Commonwealth Games NI selected a team of four bowlers for the Games.

Men

Athlete	Event	Group Stage							Semifinal	Final / BM	
Athlete	Event	Opposition Score	Opposition Score	Opposition Score	Opposition Score	Opposition Score	Opposition Score	Rank	Opposition Score	Opposition Score	Rank
Gary Kelly	Singles	McIlroy (NZL); W 2–0	Hill (TGA); W 1–1*	Tafatu (NIU); W 2–0	Rittmuller (RSA); W 2–0	Yuen (SGP); W 2–0	Graham (NFK); W 1–1*	1 Q	Tolchard (ENG); L 0–2	Wilson (AUS); W 2–0	3rd place, bronze medalist(s)
Gary Kelly; Adam McKeown	Pairs	Hill / Nathan (TGA); W 2–0	Khan / Qureshi (PAK); W 2–0	Forsyth / Grantham (NZL); W 1*–1	LC Prasad / S Prasad (FIJ); W 2–0	Teys / Wedlock (AUS); W 1.5–0.5	–	1 Q	Rusli / Rahim (MAS); W 1*–1	Brett / Walker (ENG); W 1*–1	1st place, gold medalist(s)

Women

Athlete	Event	Group Stage							Semifinal	Final / BM	
Athlete	Event	Opposition Score	Opposition Score	Opposition Score	Opposition Score	Opposition Score	Opposition Score	Rank	Opposition Score	Opposition Score	Rank
Shauna O’Neill	Singles	Papani (NIU); W 2–0	Mooketsi (BOT); W 2–0	Tiong (SGP); W 1*–1	Bruce (NZL); W 1*–1	Merrien (GGY); L 0–2	—	2	Did not advance		
Shauna O’Neill; Chloe Wilson	Pairs	Merrien / Ogier (GGY); W 2–0	Whitehead / Garrett (IOM); W 2–0	Cottrell / Hayman (AUS); L 0–2	Banda / Siame (ZAM); W 2–0	Tan / Lin (SGP); W 2–0	Ioane / Papani (NIU); W 2–0	1 Q	Haidar / Nawawi (MAS); L 1–1*	Williams / Gowen (WAL); W 2–0	3rd place, bronze medalist(s)

== Track cycling ==
Northern Ireland selected a team of five cyclists including one para athlete, all events will take place at the Sir Chris Hoy Velodrome.

Women

- Erin Creighton
- Emma Jeffers
- Esther Wong

Men

- Matthew Dobbins
- Chris Burns (Para Cyclist)

Points race

Athlete	Event	Qualification		Final	
Athlete	Event	Points	Rank	Points	Rank
Matti Dobbins	Men's point race	0	12	Did not advance	
Erin Creighton	Women's point race	—N/a		0	19
Emma Jeffers	Women's point race	—N/a		0	18
Esther Wong	Women's point race	—N/a		0	21

Scratch race

Athlete	Event	Qualification	Final
Athlete	Event	Rank	Rank
Matti Dobbins	Men's scratch race	5 Q	DNF
Erin Creighton	Women's scratch race	—N/a	10
Emma Jeffers	Women's scratch race	—N/a	11
Esther Wong	Women's scratch race	—N/a	19

Elimination race

Athlete	Event	Final
Athlete	Event	Rank
Matti Dobbins	Men's elimination race	20
Erin Creighton	Women's elimination race	14
Emma Jeffers	Women's elimination race	DNS
Esther Wong	Women's elimination race	21

Pursuit

Athlete	Event	Qualification		Final	
Athlete	Event	Time	Rank	Opponent Results	Rank
Esther Wong	Women's individual pursuit	4:46.298	11	Did not advance	
Chris Burns	Men's individual pursuit C1–3	3:56.480	6	Did not advance	

Time trial

Athlete	Event	Time	Rank
Chris Burns	Men's 1 km time trial C1–3	1:13.836	5

== Artistic gymnastics ==
Northern Ireland selected a team of four gymnasts for Glasgow 2026, but chose not to contest the team event. Chester Enriquez withdrew with injury.

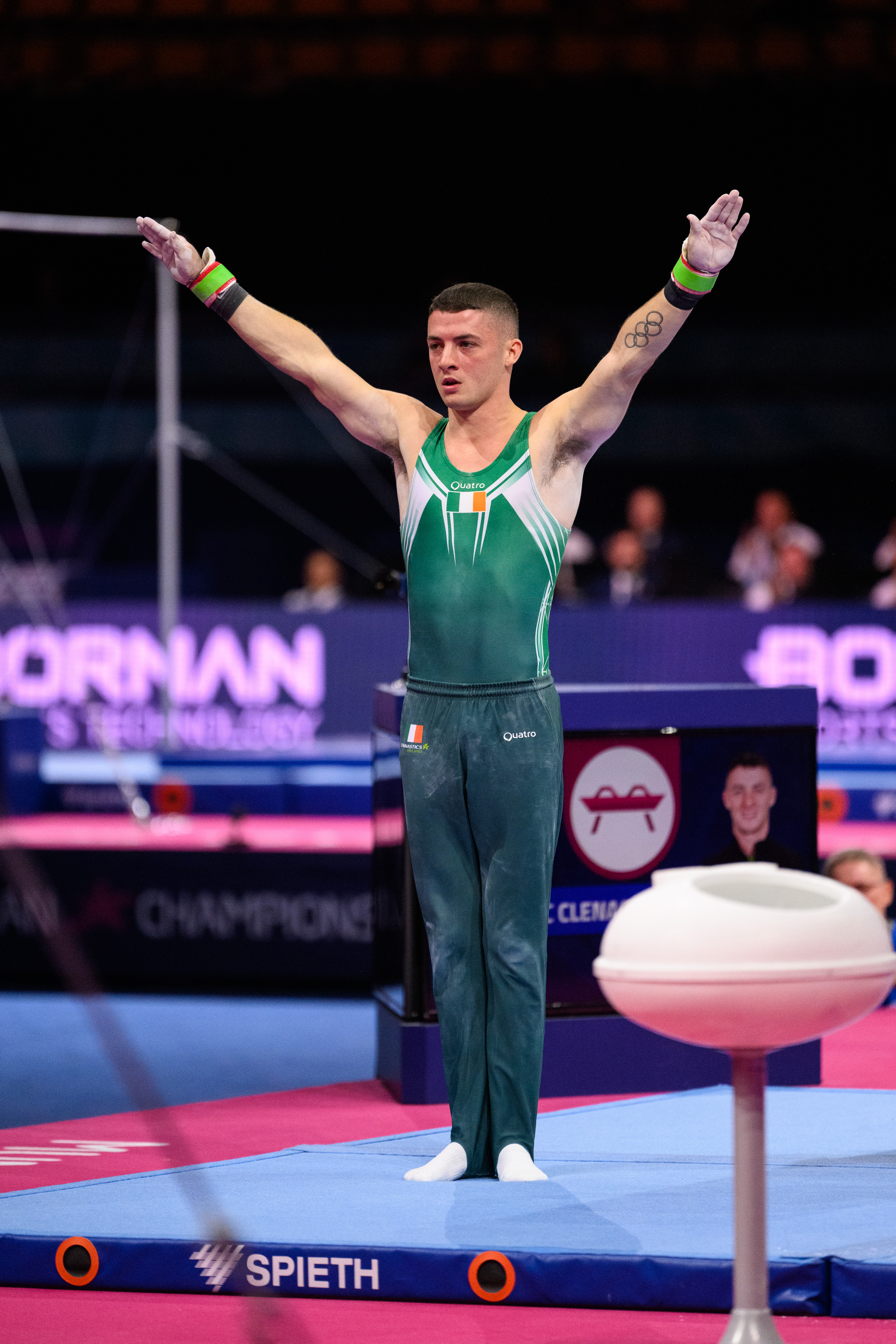
Rhys McClenaghan

Men
Individual Qualification

Athlete	Event	Apparatus					
Athlete	Event	F	PH	R	V	PB	HB
Rhys McClenaghan	Team	12.750 R	14.500 Q	-	-	-	-
Eamon Montgomery	Team	13.000	-	-	-	-	-
Ewan McAteer	Team	-		-	13.650 Q	-	-

Pommel horse

Athlete	Event	Difficulty	Execution	Penalty	Total	Rank
Rhys McClenaghan	Pommel horse	5.200	7.800	—	13.000	6

Vault

Athlete	Event	Vault 1			Vault 2			Total	Rank
Athlete	Event	Difficulty	Execution	Penalty	Difficulty	Execution	Penalty	Total	Rank
Ewan McAteer	Vault	4.800	8.200	–0.300	4.400	8.500	–0.100	13.650	7

== Judo ==
Team Northern Ireland will send a team of 3 judoka they announced their team on 20 June 2026.

Athlete	Event	Round of 32	Round of 16	Quarterfinals	Semifinals	Repechage	Final/BM	
Athlete	Event	Opposition Result	Opposition Result	Opposition Result	Opposition Result	Opposition Result	Opposition Result	Rank
Rachael Hawkes	Women's 70 kg	—	bye	de Villiers (NZL); L 0–101s1	Did not advance	Devall (WAL); W 1s1–0s1	Thibault (CAN); W 100–000	3rd place, bronze medalist(s)
Joshua Green	Men's 73 kg	bye	Lawson (TOG); W 1s1–0s2	Short (SCO); W 1s2–0	Levy (ENG); L 0–11s1	—N/a	Moore (WAL); W 10–0s2	3rd place, bronze medalist(s)
Adam Hall	Men's +100 kg	—	Takayawa (FIJ); L 0s2–101s1	Did not advance				

== Netball ==
Northern Ireland qualified as one of the top 11 eligible teams in the World Netball Rankings as of September 1, 2025.

Roster

12 Player Squad
Name	Club
Michelle Magee (Captain)	(England) Birmingham Panthers
Caroline O'Hanlon (VC)	(Northern Ireland) Larkfield
Emma Magee	(Northern Ireland) The Downs Netball Club
Evelyn McCagherty	(England) Nottingham Forest
Fionnuala Toner	(Northern Ireland) Belfast Ladies Netball Club
Frances Keenan	(Northern Ireland) Belfast Ladies Netball Club
Georgie McGrath	(Northern Ireland) Kingsway
Lauren Walshe	(Northern Ireland) Belfast Ladies Netball Club
Lisa Bowman	(Northern Ireland) Larkfield
Maria McCann	(Northern Ireland) Belfast Ladies Netball Club
Niamh Cooper	(England) Nottingham Forest
Orlaith Rogers	(England) Leeds Rhinos

Reserves: Ciara Crosbie, Lisa Carlin, Rachel Duckers & Orla McGeough

Summary

Team	Event	Group stage						Semifinal	Final / BM / Cl.	
Team	Event	Opposition Result	Opposition Result	Opposition Result	Opposition Result	Opposition Result	Rank	Opposition Result	Opposition Result	Rank
Northern Ireland	Women's tournament	England; L 34-83	Australia; L 27-88	Malawi; L 48-64	Tonga; L 52-58	South Africa; L 30-78	6	Did not advance	11th place match Trinidad and Tobago; W 78-39	11

Group stage

Pos	Team	Pld	W	D	L	GF	GA	GD	Pts	Qualification
1	Australia	5	5	0	0	378	191	+187	10	Semi-finals
2	England	5	4	0	1	355	224	+131	8	Semi-finals
3	South Africa	5	3	0	2	340	231	+109	6	Classification matches
4	Malawi	5	2	0	3	233	303	−70	4	Classification matches
5	Tonga	5	1	0	4	219	396	−177	2	Classification matches
6	Northern Ireland	5	0	0	5	191	371	−180	0	Classification matches

Source: Glasgow 2026

25 July 2026; 14:00	Report	England	83–34	Northern Ireland	OVO Hydro; Umpires: Justin Barnes, Kristie Simpson; Reserve umpire: Tracy-Ann Griffiths
25 July 2026; 14:00	Report	Scoring by quarter: 24–7, 17–11, 19–8, 23–8			OVO Hydro; Umpires: Justin Barnes, Kristie Simpson; Reserve umpire: Tracy-Ann Griffiths
25 July 2026; 14:00	Report	Eleanor Cardwell 36/38 (95%); Olivia Tchine 25/26 (96%); Sasha Glasgow 12/12 (100%); Lois Pearson 4/5 (80%); Ella Clark 6/8 (75%)		Lisa Bowman 24/28 (86%); Orlaith Rogers 7/9 (78%); Emma Magee 3/4 (75%); Georgie McGrath 0/2 (0%)	OVO Hydro; Umpires: Justin Barnes, Kristie Simpson; Reserve umpire: Tracy-Ann Griffiths

26 July 2026; 14:00	Report	Malawi	64–48	Northern Ireland	OVO Hydro; Umpires: Tania Fink, Gary Burgess; Reserve umpire: Kristie Simpson
26 July 2026; 14:00	Report	Scoring by quarter: 19–9, 16–14, 9–15, 20–10			OVO Hydro; Umpires: Tania Fink, Gary Burgess; Reserve umpire: Kristie Simpson
26 July 2026; 14:00	Report	Mwai Kumwenda 57/58 (98%); Ethel Ng'ambi 7/7 (100%)		Lisa Bowman 30/34 (88%); Orlaith Rogers 15/19 (79%); Emma Magee 3/4 (75%)	OVO Hydro; Umpires: Tania Fink, Gary Burgess; Reserve umpire: Kristie Simpson

27 July 2026; 16:00	Report	Tonga	58–52	Northern Ireland	OVO Hydro; Umpires: Kate Mann, Tracy-Ann Griffiths; Reserve umpire: Bronwen Adams
27 July 2026; 16:00	Report	Scoring by quarter: 15–11, 16–15, 14–11, 15–15			OVO Hydro; Umpires: Kate Mann, Tracy-Ann Griffiths; Reserve umpire: Bronwen Adams
27 July 2026; 16:00	Report	Uneeq Palavi 49/50 (98%); Marie Payn 7/7 (100%); Sovika Pousini 2/4 (50%)		Lisa Bowman 32/41 (78%); Emma Magee 9/13 (69%); Georgie McGraith 8/11 (73%); Orlaith Rogers 3/3 (100%)	OVO Hydro; Umpires: Kate Mann, Tracy-Ann Griffiths; Reserve umpire: Bronwen Adams

28 July 2026; 14:00	Report	South Africa	78–30	Northern Ireland	OVO Hydro; Umpires: Georgina Sulley-Beales, Kate Mann; Reserve umpire: Ken Metekingi
28 July 2026; 14:00	Report	Scoring by quarter: 14–8, 18–10, 21–4, 25–8			OVO Hydro; Umpires: Georgina Sulley-Beales, Kate Mann; Reserve umpire: Ken Metekingi
28 July 2026; 14:00	Report	Elmeré van der Berg 39/42 (93%); Rolene Streutker 25/28 (89%); Kamogelo Maseko 11/11 (100%); Sammy Ngubane 3/4 (75%)		Lisa Bowman 17/24 (71%); Orlaith Rogers 8/10 (80%); Emma Magee 5/8 (63%)	OVO Hydro; Umpires: Georgina Sulley-Beales, Kate Mann; Reserve umpire: Ken Metekingi

30 July 2026; 16:00	Report	Australia	88–27	Northern Ireland	OVO Hydro; Umpires: Gary Burgess, Angela Armstrong-Lush; Reserve umpire: Alison Harrison
30 July 2026; 16:00	Report	Scoring by quarter: 27–6, 20–4, 19–12, 22–5			OVO Hydro; Umpires: Gary Burgess, Angela Armstrong-Lush; Reserve umpire: Alison Harrison
30 July 2026; 16:00	Report	Cara Koenen 57/58 (98%); Sophie Garbin 15/15 (100%); Sophie Dwyer 11/11 (100%); Georgie Horjus 5/7 (71%)		Lisa Bowman 15/18 (83%); Orlaith Rogers 7/10 (70%); Georgie McGrath 3/5 (60%); Emma Magee 2/3 (67%)	OVO Hydro; Umpires: Gary Burgess, Angela Armstrong-Lush; Reserve umpire: Alison Harrison

Eleventh place match

31 July 2026; 09:00	Report	Northern Ireland	78–39	Trinidad and Tobago	OVO Hydro; Umpires: Tracy-Ann Griffiths, Alison Harrison; Reserve umpire: Kate Mann
31 July 2026; 09:00	Report	Scoring by quarter: 19–10, 21–8, 20–10, 18–11			OVO Hydro; Umpires: Tracy-Ann Griffiths, Alison Harrison; Reserve umpire: Kate Mann
31 July 2026; 09:00	Report	Lisa Bowman 45/51 (88%); Orlaith Rogers 14/15 (93%); Georgie McGrath 10/10 (100%); Emma Magee 9/9 (100%)		Afeisha Noel 26/31 (84%); Joelisa Cooper 6/6 (100%); Demisha Henry 6/7 (86%); Janeisha Cassimy 1/1 (100%)	OVO Hydro; Umpires: Tracy-Ann Griffiths, Alison Harrison; Reserve umpire: Kate Mann

== Swimming ==
Swim Ireland announced the Northern Ireland swimming team for the 2026 Commonwealth Games on 13 May 2026. Men

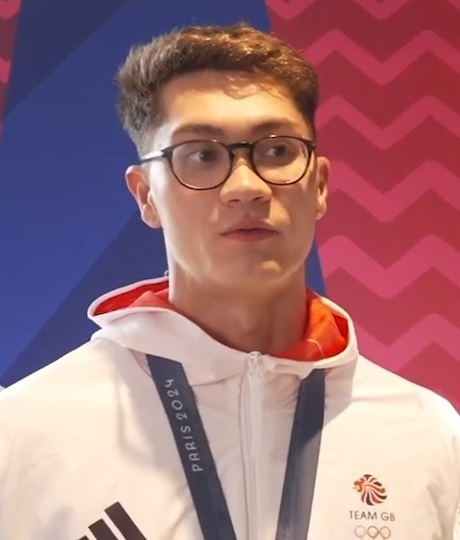
Jack McMillan

Athlete	Event	Heat		Semifinal		Final	
Athlete	Event	Time	Rank	Time	Rank	Time	Rank
Jack McMillan	100 m freestyle	49.51	10 Q	49.13	11	did not advance	
Jack McMillan	200 m freestyle	1:46.72	5 Q	–		1:46.29	6
Jack McMillan	400 m freestyle	3:48.65	7 Q	–		3:49.18	7
Daniel Wiffen	400 m freestyle	3:47.01	3 Q	–		3:47.22	5
Daniel Wiffen	800 m freestyle	–				7:48.82	4
Daniel Wiffen	1500 m freestyle	–				14:44.70	2nd place, silver medalist(s)
Conor Ferguson	50 m backstroke	25.48	12 Q	25.85	16	did not advance	
Paddy Johnston	50 m backstroke	25.38	11 Q	25.63	15	did not advance	
Barry McClements	100 m backstroke S8	1:07.30	4 Q	–		1:03.68	2nd place, silver medalist(s)
Barry McClements	100 m butterfly S10	1:01.92	5 Q	–		1:01.64	6
Matthew Hamilton; Paddy Johnston; Adam Bradley; Jack McMillan	4 x 100 m medley relay	3:41.06	6 Q	—		3:37.58	6

Women

Athlete	Event	Heat		Semifinal		Final	
Athlete	Event	Time	Rank	Time	Rank	Time	Rank
Danielle Hill	50 m freestyle						
Danielle Hill	50 m backstroke	28.04	2 Q				
Danielle Hill	100 m backstroke	1:01.28	8 Q	1:00.83	9	did not advance	
Grace Davison	100 m freestyle						
Grace Davison	200 m freestyle			–			
Grace Davison	100 m backstroke	1:01.21					
Grace Davison	200 m backstroke			–			
Lottie Cullen	100 m backstroke						
Lottie Cullen	200 m backstroke			–			
Ellie McCartney	100 m breaststroke						
Ellie McCartney	200 m breaststroke			–			
Ellie McCartney	200 m individual medley			–			
Bethany Firth	200 m freestyle S14	2:09.96	1 Q	—		2:07.63	3rd place, bronze medalist(s)
Alana Burns-Atkin; Victoria Catterson; Emily Hughes; TBC	4 x 100m medley relay			—			

== Weightlifting ==
On 18 May 2026, the IWF Commonwealth Games weightlifting ranking lists were finalised. The top eight ranked lifters, limited to one per CGA, and not including Scotland (who got automatic host spots) and the directly qualified reigning Commonwealth Weightlifting champions, gained a quota place for the games in their weight class.

Northern Ireland qualified four lifters.

Athlete	Event	Snatch (kg)		Clean & Jerk (kg)		Total (kg)	Rank
Athlete	Event	Result	Rank	Result	Rank	Total (kg)	Rank
Harrison McGrogan	Men's 71 kg						
Omar Keshta	Men's +110 kg						
Hannah Crymble	Women's 63 kg						
Kaitlin Saunders	Women's 77 kg						

== Events not contested ==
=== 3x3 Basketball ===
Both men's and women's teams took part in the Home Nations Qualifier alongside England, Wales and the Isle of Man, but both failed to qualify. The men won their first two matches against Wales and the Isle of Man before losing their final group stage game against England and then losing to them again in the final 21-9, while the women lost against both Wales and England while they beat the Isle of Man.

The men's and women's 3x3 squads took part in the IWBF Europe Qualifier in Nottingham in April 2026. The women's team lost both of their games against England and Wales, while the men's team lost to Wales in their semi-final after beating Wales and Cyprus in the group as well as losing to England.
