= Track cycling at the 2026 Commonwealth Games =

- Track cycling and para track cycling pictogram
- Venue: Sir Chris Hoy Velodrome, Glasgow
- Dates: 30 July – 2 August 2026
- Competitors: 155 from 23 nations

Track cycling at the 2026 Commonwealth Games was the 22nd appearance of Cycling at the Commonwealth Games. The cycling competition at the 2026 Commonwealth Games was held between 30 July and 2 August 2026 at the Sir Chris Hoy Velodrome in Glasgow. Unlike previous games, only track events were contested in both able-bodied and para-cycling categories.

Despite the loss of mountain-biking and road cycling events, the programme remained at 26 medal events with the addition of the elimination race for both men and women, and the expansion of the para-cycling program to include C1–3 men's and C4–5 women's events, while the women's team sprint and time trial events were extended to match the race distances of the men's events.

== Schedule ==
The competition schedule is as follows:

Qualifying / Heats / Repechage	¼	Quarter-finals	½	Semi-finals	F	Medal final(s)

Track and para-track cycling
Date Event	Thu 30			Fri 31			Sat 1				Sun 2		
Session →	M		A	M	A		M		A		M		A
Track cycling
Men's sprint							Q	¼	½	F			
Men's keirin				Q	½	F							
Men's 1 km time trial											F		
Men's team sprint	Q		F										
Men's individual pursuit				Q	F								
Men's points race											Q		F
Men's scratch race							Q		F				
Men's elimination race				Q	F								
Men's team pursuit	Q		F										
Women's sprint				Q	½	F							
Women's keirin											Q	½	F
Women's 1 km time trial									F				
Women's team sprint	Q		F										
Women's individual pursuit				Q	F								
Women's points race							Q		F				
Women's scratch race				Q	F								
Women's elimination race											Q		F
Women's team pursuit	Q		F										
Para-track cycling
Men's tandem sprint B							Q	½	F				
Men's tandem 1 km time trial B			F										
Men's 1 km time trial C1–3					F								
Men's individual pursuit C1–3											Q		F
Women's tandem sprint B	Q	½	F										
Women's tandem 1 km time trial B									F				
Women's 1 km time trial C4–5													F
Women's individual pursuit C4–5	Q		F										

== Participating nations ==
There were 23 participating Commonwealth Games Associations (CGAs) in track cycling with a total of 155 athletes (91 men and 64 women). The number of athletes a nation entered is in parentheses beside the name of the country. Both Belize and Gambia entered one male cyclist each, but both athletes did not contest an event.

- Anguilla (1)
- Antigua and Barbuda (1)
- Australia (23)
- Bermuda (1)
- Canada (8)
- England (23)
- Ghana (2)
- Grenada (1)
- India (7)
- Isle of Man (2)
- Jamaica (1)
- Kenya (6)
- Malaysia (9)
- Nigeria (1)
- Northern Ireland (5)
- New Zealand (17)
- South Africa (2)
- Scotland (18)
- Singapore (2)
- Sierra Leone (2)
- Trinidad and Tobago (4)
- Uganda (1)
- Wales (18)

== Medal summary ==
=== Medal table ===
* Host nation (Scotland)

Rank	Nation	Gold	Silver	Bronze	Total
1	Australia	10	10	8	28
2	Wales	6	3	2	11
3	England	3	7	5	15
4	New Zealand	3	3	5	11
5	Scotland*	2	2	4	8
6	Isle of Man	1	0	0	1
6	Malaysia	1	0	0	1
8	Trinidad and Tobago	0	1	1	2
9	Canada	0	0	1	1
Totals (9 entries)		26	26	26	78

=== Medalists ===
==== Men ====
Event	Gold	Silver	Bronze
Sprint	Leigh Hoffman; Australia	Nicholas Paul; Trinidad and Tobago	Tayte Ryan; Australia
Team sprint	Australia; Daniel Barber; Ryan Elliott; Leigh Hoffman	England; Harry Ledingham-Horn; Joseph Truman; Hamish Turnbull	Trinidad and Tobago; Nicholas Paul; Njisane Phillip; Zion Pulido
Keirin	Azizulhasni Awang; Malaysia	Leigh Hoffman; Australia	Harry Ledingham-Horn; England
1 km time trial	Leigh Hoffman; Australia	Joseph Truman; England	Tayte Ryan; Australia
Individual pursuit	Oliver Bleddyn; Australia	Conor Leahy; Australia	James Moriarty; Australia
Team pursuit	England; Henry Hobbs; Charlie Tanfield; William Tidball; Ethan Vernon	Australia; Blake Agnoletto; Oliver Bleddyn; Conor Leahy; James Moriarty	New Zealand; Marshall Erwood; George Jackson; Daniel Morton; Thomas Sexton
Points race	Matthew Bostock; Isle of Man	Oliver Bleddyn; Australia	George Jackson; New Zealand
Scratch race	Henry Hobbs; England	Thomas Cornish; Australia	Ethan Vernon; England
Elimination race	Blake Agnoletto; Australia	Mark Stewart; Scotland	Henry Hobbs; England

==== Women ====
Event	Gold	Silver	Bronze
Sprint	Emma Finucane; Wales	Sophie Capewell; England	Rhian Edmunds; Wales
Team sprint	Wales; Rhian Edmunds; Emma Finucane; Lowri Thomas	England; Sophie Capewell; Katy Marchant; Rhianna Parris-Smith	Scotland; Lauren Bell; Iona Moir; Madeleine Silcock
Keirin	Emma Finucane; Wales	Ellesse Andrews; New Zealand	Kristina Clonan; Australia
1 km time trial	Emma Finucane; Wales	Claudia Marcks; Australia	Ellesse Andrews; New Zealand
Individual pursuit	Anna Morris; Wales	Josie Knight; England	Erin Boothman; Scotland
Team pursuit	Australia; Georgia Baker; Claudia Marcks; Alyssa Polites; Felicity Wilson-Haffenden	New Zealand; Bryony Botha; Prudence Fowler; Emily Shearman; Ally Wollaston	Wales; Megan Barker; Anna Morris; Ciara Oliva; Jessica Roberts
Points race	Anna Morris; Wales	Jessica Roberts; Wales	Georgia Baker; Australia
Scratch race	Georgia Baker; Australia	Samantha Donnelly; New Zealand	Erin Boothman; Scotland
Elimination race	Alyssa Polites; Australia	Georgia Baker; Australia	Maggie Coles-Lyster; Canada

==== Para Men ====
Event	Gold	Silver	Bronze
Men's tandem sprint B	Scotland; Neil Fachie; Aaron Pope (Pilot)	Wales; James Ball; Matt Rotherham (Pilot)	Australia; Kane Perris; Luke Zaccaria (Pilot)
Men's tandem 1 km time trial B	Scotland; Neil Fachie; Aaron Pope (Pilot)	Wales; James Ball; Matt Rotherham (Pilot)	Australia; Kane Perris; Luke Zaccaria (Pilot)
Men's 1 km time trial C1–3	Devon Briggs; New Zealand	Gordon Allan; Australia	Fin Graham; Scotland
Men's individual pursuit C1–3	Matthew Robertson; England	Fin Graham; Scotland	Devon Briggs; New Zealand

==== Para women ====
Event	Gold	Silver	Bronze
Women's tandem sprint B	New Zealand; Emma Foy; Jessie Hodges (Pilot)	Australia; Jessica Gallagher; Jacqui Mengler-Mohr (Pilot)	England; Elizabeth Jordan; Sylvia Misztal (Pilot)
Women's tandem 1 km time trial B	New Zealand; Emma Foy; Jessie Hodges (Pilot)	Australia; Jessica Gallagher; Jacqui Mengler-Mohr (Pilot)	England; Sophie Unwin; Anna Whitworth-Hay (Pilot)
Women's individual pursuit C4–5	Tara Neyland; Australia	Morgan Newberry; England	Nicole Murray; New Zealand
Women's 1 km time trial C4–5	Tara Neyland; Australia	Kadeena Cox; England	Erin Normoyle; Australia
