= Track cycling at the 2026 Commonwealth Games – Women's team pursuit =

Cycling Track – Women's team pursuit at the 2026 Commonwealth Games
- Venue: Sir Chris Hoy Velodrome
- Dates: 30 July

Medalists
gold medal	Georgia Baker; Claudia Marcks; Alyssa Polites; Felicity Wilson-Haffenden	Australia
silver medal	Bryony Botha; Prudence Fowler; Emily Shearman; Ally Wollaston	New Zealand
bronze medal	Megan Barker; Anna Morris; Ciara Oliva; Jessica Roberts	Wales

The women's team pursuit at the 2026 Commonwealth Games was part of the cycling programme, and took place on 30 July 2026.

== Records ==
Prior to this competition, the existing world and Games records were as follows:

World record	Great Britain (Katie Archibald, Josie Knight, Anna Morris, Millie Couzens)	4:02.808	Konya Velodrome, Konya	2 February 2026
Games record	Australia (Georgia Baker, Sophie Edwards, Chloe Moran, Maeve Plouffe)	4:12.234	Lee Valley VeloPark, London	29 July 2022

== Schedule ==
The schedule is as follows:

All times are British Summer Time (UTC+1)

Date	Time	Round
Thursday 30 July 2026	10:15	Qualifying
Thursday 30 July 2026	16:36	Finals

== Results ==
=== Qualifying ===
The two fastest teams advanced to the gold medal final. The next two fastest teams advanced to the bronze medal final.

Rank	Nation	Time	Behind	Notes
1	Australia; Sophie Edwards; Claudia Marcks; Alyssa Polites; Felicity Wilson-Haffenden	4:13.469		QG
2	New Zealand; Bryony Botha; Samantha Donnelly; Prudence Fowler; Ally Wollaston	4:13.698	+0.229	QG
3	Wales; Megan Barker; Anna Morris; Ciara Oliva; Jessica Roberts	4:15.514	+2.045	QB
4	England; Josie Knight; Madelaine Leech; Grace Lister; Abigail Miller	4:16.534	+3.065	QB
5	Kenya; Nancy Debe; Josette Kiarie; Monica Jelimo Kiplagat; Kendra Masiga	5:50.745	+1:37.276	

=== Finals ===
Rank	Nation	Time	Behind	Notes
Gold medal final
1st place, gold medalist(s)	Australia; Georgia Baker; Claudia Marcks; Alyssa Polites; Felicity Wilson-Haffenden	4:10.658		GR
2nd place, silver medalist(s)	New Zealand; Bryony Botha; Prudence Fowler; Emily Shearman; Ally Wollaston	4:12.775	+2.117	
Bronze medal final
3rd place, bronze medalist(s)	Wales; Megan Barker; Anna Morris; Ciara Oliva; Jessica Roberts	4:12.973		
4	England; Josie Knight; Sophie Lewis; Grace Lister; Abigail Miller	4:20.653	+7.680	
