= Cycling at the 2022 Commonwealth Games – Women's points race =

Cycling Track – Women's points race at the 2022 Commonwealth Games
- Venue: Lee Valley VeloPark
- Dates: 31 July 2022
- Competitors: 19 from 9 nations
- Winning points: 55

Medalists
gold medal	Georgia Baker	Australia
silver medal	Neah Evans	Scotland
bronze medal	Eluned King	Wales

The women's points race at the 2022 Commonwealth Games, as part of the cycling programme, took place on 31 July 2022.

== Schedule ==
The schedule was as follows:

All times are British Summer Time (UTC+1)

Date	Time	Round
Sunday 31 July 2022	15:53	Final

== Results ==
=== Final ===
100 laps (25 km) were raced with 10 sprints.

Rank	Rider	Lap points	Sprint points	Total points
1st place, gold medalist(s)	Georgia Baker (AUS)	20	35	55
2nd place, silver medalist(s)	Neah Evans (SCO)	20	16	36
3rd place, bronze medalist(s)	Eluned King (WAL)	20	12	32
4	Maggie Coles-Lyster (CAN)	20	7	27
5	Michaela Drummond (NZL)	20	7	27
6	Josie Knight (ENG)	20	6	26
7	Chloe Moran (AUS)	20	5	25
8	Bryony Botha (NZL)	20	3	23
9	Emily Shearman (NZL)	20	2	22
10	Jessica Roverts (WAL)	20	1	21
11	Alice Sharpe (NIR)		6	6
12	Ariane Bonhomme (CAN)		5	5
13	Laura Kenny (ENG)		5	5
14	Maddie Leech (ENG)		1	1
15	Anna Morris (WAL)			0
16	Maeve Plouffe (AUS)			0
17	Amber Paige M Joseph (BAR)	-20		-20
18	Ngaire Barraclough (CAN)			DNF
18	Alexi Costa-Ramirez (TTO)	-40		DNF
