= Athletics at the 2026 Commonwealth Games – Women's long jump (T38) =

Women's long jump (T38) at the 2026 Commonwealth Games
- Venue: Scotstoun Stadium, Glasgow
- Dates: 31 July (final)

Medalists
gold medal	Olivia Breen	Wales
silver medal	Layla Sharp	Australia
bronze medal	Alya Kowalczyk	Australia

The women's long jump (T38) at the 2026 Commonwealth Games, as part of the athletics programme, will take place in the Scotstoun Stadium on 31 July 2026. The event is open to ambulant female athletes with a significant impairment of motor control or co-ordination, in classes T37 and T38.

Contested in 2014 and 2018, the event returns after a hiatus from the 2022 Commonwealth Games. This will be the fourth edition of the Games to have a women's long jump broadly in the T38 classification.

Despite the gap, the 2018 Games champion, Olivia Breen from Wales, will return to defend her title.

== Records ==
Prior to this competition, the existing records were as follows:

Record (T37)
World record	5.45 m	Wen Xiaoyan (CHN)	Hangzhou, China	24 October 2023
Record (T38)
World record	5. 82 m	Luca Ekler (HUN)	Paris, France	10 June 2022
Games Record	4.86 m	Olivia Breen (WAL)	Gold Coast, Australia	8 April 2018

== Qualification ==
Para athletic event qualification is regulated by a special system organised between Commonwealth Sport and the International Paralympic Committee. Each para athletic event allowed for eight quota places, or 10 in the case of throwing events. All but one quota in each event was available on the basis of the Commonwealth Para Rankings on 31 Match 2026, to a maximum of two per Commonwealth Games Association (CGA), with the remaining quota allocated by Bipartite invitation.

This list did not set a limit on entrants, as other athletes in the same classification, but qualified directly for another event, could enter the event in question, up to a maximum (combined quota, invitation and 'separate event' quota) of three per event per CGA.

In the case of the women's long jump (T38), three events – the T37/38 100 metres, 200 metres and long jump – share classifications.

== Schedule ==
The schedule is as follows:

Date	Time	Round
31 July 2026	10:00	Final

All times are British Summer Time (UTC+1)

== Results ==
=== Final ===
The women's long jump (T38) will be held as a stand alone final. The event is scheduled for the morning of 31 July 2026.

Rank	Name	Country	Attempts						Result	Notes
Rank	Name	Country	1	2	3	4	5	6	Result	Notes
1st place, gold medalist(s)	Olivia Breen	Wales	5.09	5.03	4.86	x	x	x	5.09	
2nd place, silver medalist(s)	Layla Sharp	Australia	x	5.02	4.89	x	x	5.06	5.06	GR*
3rd place, bronze medalist(s)	Ayla Kowalczyk	Australia	4.58	4.36	4.42	4.58	4.32	4.71	4.71	PB
4	Anais Angeline	Mauritius	4.71	4.45	4.39	4.41	4.42	4.31	4.71	AR
5	Sienna Newton	Australia	4.50	4.49	4.51	4.15	4.70	x	4.70	PB
6	Maddie Down	England	x	x	4.59	x	4.65	x	4.65	SB
7	Liezel Gouws	South Africa	x	4.38	4.01	4.35	4.20	4.35	4.38	SB*
8	Elizabeth Dodds	England	x	x	4.07	x	x	x	4.07	SB
—	Eve Walsh Dann	Northern Ireland	x	x	x	0	0	0	NM	
The event was strongly wind affected, and the winning jump of 5.09 m by Olivia Breen, while valid for competition, was ineligible for records purposes for a >2.0 m/s following wind. The final effort of Layla Sharp was less than the 5.09 m effort of Breen, but was made in wind legal conditions, and thus is recognised as a new Games record.
