= Athletics at the 2026 Commonwealth Games – Women's 100 metres (T38) =

Women's 100 metres (T38) at the 2026 Commonwealth Games
- Venue: Scotstoun Stadium, Glasgow
- Dates: 27 July 2026 (heats and final)
- Competitors: 10 from 6 nations
- Winning time: 12.79

Medalists
gold medal	Sophie Hahn	England
silver medal	Olivia Breen	Wales
bronze medal	Maddie Down	England

The women's 100 metres (T38) event at the 2026 Commonwealth Games, also referred to as the women's 100 metres T37/38 event, as part of the para-athletics programme, will take place at the Scotstoun Stadium on 27 July 2026.

The event is open to female para-athletes in the T37 and T38 classification for ambulant para-athletes with a physical or co-ordination impairment.

The entire podium from 2022 are set to return to contest the event in 2026, with reigning champion from 2022, Wales' Olivia Breen returning to defend her title following selection for Tim Cymru/Team Wales, along with 2018 champion, and 2022 silver medalist, England's Sophie Hahn who was preselected for Team England. Rhiannon Clarke, who won bronze in 2022, also returns following selection by the Australian association.

== Records ==
Prior to this competition, the existing world and Games records were as follows:

Records T37
World record	Wen Xiaoyan (CHN)	12.27	Kobe, Japan	21 May 2024
Records T38
World record	Karen Palomeque (COL)	12.26	Paris, France	31 August 2024
Games record	Sophie Hahn (ENG)	12.46	Gold Coast, Australia	12 April 2018

== Schedule ==
The schedule is as follows:

Date	Time	Round
27 July 2026	10:00	First round
27 July 2026	18:30	Final

All times are United Kingdom time (UTC+1)

== Qualification ==
Para athletic event qualification is regulated by a special system organised between Commonwealth Sport and the International Paralympic Committee. Each para athletic event allowed for eight quota places, or 10 in the case of throwing events. All but one quota in each event was available on the basis of the Commonwealth Para Rankings on 31 Match 2026, to a maximum of two per Commonwealth Games Association (CGA), with the remaining quota allocated by Bipartite invitation.

This list did not set a limit on entrants, as other athletes in the same classification, but qualified directly for another event, could enter the event in question, up to a maximum (combined quota, invitation and 'separate event' quota) of three per event per CGA.

In the case of the women's 100 metres (T38), three events—the T27/38 100 metres, 200 metres and long jump—share eligible classifications.

== Entrants ==
The following national associations have entered athletes in this event. further athletes may be entered before the event is commenced:

- Australia (2)
- England (2)
- Canada (1)
- Wales (1)
- Mauritius (1)
- Northern Ireland (1)
- South Africa (1)

== Results ==
=== First round ===
The first round is scheduled for the morning session of 27 July 2026.

==== Heat 1 ====
Place	Lane	Athlete	Nation	Time	Notes
1	3	Sophie Hahn	England	12.75	Q, SB
2	5	Ella Azura Pardy	Australia	13.44	Q, SB
3	7	Briseis Brittain	Australia	13.50	Q, SB
4	6	Natalie Thirsk	Canada	13.62	q, PB
5	4	Liezel Gouws	South Africa	14.24	SB
				Wind: (+0.7 m/s)	

==== Heat 2 ====
Place	Lane	Athlete	Nation	Time	Notes
1	7	Rhiannon Clarke	Australia	12.96	Q, SB
2	6	Olivia Breen	Wales	13.05	Q, SB
3	4	Maddie Down	England	13.10	Q, SB
4	5	Sheryl James	South Africa	13.94	q, SB
5	3	Eve Walsh Dann	Northern Ireland	14.18	
				Wind: (+1.0 m/s)	

=== Final ===
The final of the women's 100 metres (T38) is scheduled for the evening session of 27 July 2026.

Place	Lane	Athlete	Nation	Time	Notes
1st place, gold medalist(s)	4	Sophie Hahn	England	12.75	
2nd place, silver medalist(s)	6	Olivia Breen	Wales	12.86 [.852]	SB
3rd place, bronze medalist(s)	2	Maddie Down	England	12.86 [.854]	PB
4	5	Rhiannon Clarke	Australia	12.94	SB
5	3	Ella Azura Pardy	Australia	13.48	
6	7	Briseis Brittain	Australia	13.50	SB
7	1	Natalie Thirsk	Canada	13.81	
8	8	Sheryl James	South Africa	14.08	
				Wind: (+1.4 m/s)	
