= Boxing at the 2026 Commonwealth Games – Men's 70 kg =

Boxing competitions

Boxing – Men's 70 kg at the 2026 Commonwealth Games
- Venue: SEC Centre
- Dates: July 24 – 1 August 2026
- Competitors: 17 from 17 nations

Medalists
gold medal	Jon McConnell	Northern Ireland
silver medal	Orlando Holley-Sotomi	Wales
bronze medal	Merven Clair	Mauritius
bronze medal	Sonny Kerr	Scotland

The men's 70 kg boxing competitions at the 2026 Commonwealth Games in Glasgow, Scotland took place between July 24 and August 1 at the SEC Centre.

Like all Commonwealth boxing events, the competition was a straight single-elimination tournament. Both semifinal losers were awarded bronze medals, so no boxers competed again after their first loss. Bouts consisted of three rounds of three minutes each, with one-minute breaks between rounds.

== Schedule ==
The schedule was as follows:

Date	Round
Saturday 24 July	Round of 32
Monday 27 July	Round of 16
Wednesday 29 July	Quarter-finals
Friday 31 July	Semi-finals
Saturday 1 August	Final

== Results ==
The draw was as follows:

=== Bracket ===
Round of 32
Refiloe Thai (LES)	4
Ayomide Foly (NGR)	0

Round of 16
Lorenzo Bonne (SEY)	0
Refiloe Thai (LES)	5
Orlando Holley-Sotomi (WAL)	4
Paddy Hewitt (ENG)	1
Eiljah Qiokata (FIJ)
Precious Nettey (GHA)	RSC
Pasoni Taafaki (TUV)	0
Merven Clair (MRI)	5
Marion Faustino Ah Tong (SAM)	RSC
Tavita Kaoma (KIR)
Sonny Kerr (SCO)	3
Boniface Maina (KEN)	0
Carl Hield (BAH)	3
Osward Talaka (SOL)	1
Sumit Kundu (IND)	1
Jon McConnell (NIR)	4

Quarterfinals
Refiloe Thai (LES)
Orlando Holley-Sotomi (WAL)	KO
Precious Nettey (GHA)	0
Merven Clair (MRI)	5
Marion Faustino Ah Tong (SAM)	0
Sonny Kerr (SCO)	5
Carl Hield (BAH)
Jon McConnell (NIR)	WO

Semifinals
Orlando Holley-Sotomi (WAL)	5
Merven Clair (MRI)	0
Sonny Kerr (SCO)	0
Jon McConnell (NIR)	5

Final
Orlando Holley-Sotomi (WAL)	1
Jon McConnell (NIR)	4
