= Eluned King =

British cyclist

Personal information
- Nickname: El
- Born: 1 August 2002 (age 24) Swansea, Wales
- Height: 170 cm (5 ft 7 in)
- Weight: 60 kg (132 lb)

Cycling career
- Sport: Cycling
- Current team: Handsling Alba Development Road Team
- Disciplines: Track, Road
- Role: Rider
- Rider type: all rounder

Amateur team
- Liv Cycling Club

Professional teams
- 2022: Le Col–Wahoo
- 2023: Lifeplus Wahoo
- 2024: Lifeplus Wahoo
- 2025–2026: Handsling Alba Development Road Team
Medal record
Representing Wales
Commonwealth Games
Bronze medal – third place	2022 Birmingham	points race

Eluned King (born 1 August 2002) is a British and Welsh international cyclist. In 2022, she represented Wales at the Commonwealth Games and won a bronze medal in the points race. She currently rides for UCI Women's Continental Team Alba Development Racing Team.

== Cycling career ==
King joined Le Col–Wahoo in 2022, having moved from Liv Cycling Club. She currently rides for Scottish team Alba Development and is a sports scholar at the University of Nottingham. In 2022, she was selected for the 2022 Commonwealth Games in Birmingham where she competed in the points race and won a bronze medal.
