= Track cycling at the 2026 Commonwealth Games – Men's elimination race =

Cycling Track – Men's elimination race at the 2026 Commonwealth Games
- Venue: Sir Chris Hoy Velodrome
- Dates: 31 July

Medalists
gold medal	Blake Agnoletto	Australia
silver medal	Mark Stewart	Scotland
bronze medal	Henry Hobbs	England

The men's elimination race at the 2026 Commonwealth Games was part of the cycling programme, and took place on 31 July 2026.

== Schedule ==
The schedule is as follows:

All times are British Summer Time (UTC+1)

Date	Time	Round
Friday 31 July 2026	19:23	Finals

== Results ==
Rank	Riders
1	Blake Agnoletto (AUS)
2	Mark Stewart (SCO)
3	Henry Hobbs (ENG)
4	Thomas Sexton (NZL)
5	William Tidball (ENG)
6	Keegan Hornblow (NZL)
7	Thomas Cornish (AUS)
8	Ben Swift (IOM)
9	Jadian Neaves (TTO)
10	Rory Gravelle (WAL)
11	Lewis Askey (SCO)
12	Ethan Vernon (ENG)
13	Elliot Rowe (SCO)
14	Lau New Joe (MAS)
15	Red Walters (GRN)
16	William Perrett (WAL)
17	Jonathan Hinse (CAN)
18	William Roberts (WAL)
19	George Jackson (NZL)
20	Matti Dobbins (NIR)
21	Harshveer Sekhon (IND)
22	Gabriel Seguin (CAN)
23	Delroy Carty (AIA)
