= Maddie Down =

British athlete (born 2007)

Personal information
- Born: 2007 (age 18–19)

Sport
- Sport: Sprinting, long jump
- Disability class: T38
- Events: 100m, 200m, long jump

Achievements and titles
- Paralympic finals: 2024
- World finals: 2025
- Commonwealth finals: 2023 Youth
Medal record
Representing England
Commonwealth Games
Bronze medal – third place	2026 Glasgow	100m T38
Commonwealth Youth Games
Gold medal – first place	2023 Trinbago	100m T38
Gold medal – first place	2023 Trinbago	Long jump
UK Indoor Championships
Gold medal – first place	2026 UK Indoor Championships	60m T38

Madeline Down (born 2007) is a British athlete, who won the 100 metres T38 and long jump events at the 2023 Commonwealth Youth Games.

== Career ==
Down is a member of Halesowen Athletics Club. She trains at the University of Birmingham and has been a part of the British Athletics Paralympic Futures Programme. She has been a member the British Athletics World Class Programme from the age of 17 following her performances in the Paris Paralympics.

At the 2022 Birmingham Indoor Grand Prix, Down came third in the 60 metres event. In early 2023, Down had an L5 stress fracture in her back.

At the 2023 Commonwealth Youth Games, Down won both the 100 metres T38 and long jump events; it was the first time that para sports had been included at the Commonwealth Youth Games. It was her first international competition. She was later nominated for the 2023 SportsAid One-To-Watch award. In 2024, she won the long jump events at the English Indoor and Outdoor Championships.

Down was selected for the 100 metres T38 and long jump events at the 2024 Summer Paralympics; it was her first Paralympic Games appearance. In the 100 metres event, she qualified for the final after a personal best time of 12.98s in the heats. She finished eighth in the final. In the T38 long jump she finished in 6th place with a PB of 4.81 metres.

Down was selected to represent Great Britain at the World Para Athletics Championships in Delhi in 2025, competing while still 17 years of age she jumped over 5.00m for the first time in competition and finished 5th which was also her world ranking by year end.

Down won her first senior British title winning the 60m at the UK Indoor Championships in her home city of Birmingham.

== Personal life ==
Down has attended the University of Birmingham School; her Paralympics attendance was just after she completed her GCSEs. She was inspired to compete in athletics after watching the 2012 Summer Paralympics at the age of 4. Down has cerebral palsy.
