= Wales at the 2026 Commonwealth Games =

- Flag of Wales
- CG code: WAL
- CGA: Commonwealth Games Wales
- Website: teamwales.cymru/en

in Glasgow, Scotland 23 July 2026 – 2 August 2026
- Competitors: 114 in 10 sports
- Flag bearer (opening): Rosie Eccles
- Baton bearer: Daniel Salmon
- Flag bearer (closing): Emma Finucane
- Medals Ranked 9th: Gold 9 Silver 10 Bronze 12 Total 31

Commonwealth Games appearances (overview)
- 1930; 1934; 1938; 1950; 1954; 1958; 1962; 1966; 1970; 1974; 1978; 1982; 1986; 1990; 1994; 1998; 2002; 2006; 2010; 2014; 2018; 2022; 2026; 2030

Wales was one of the competing nations at the 2026 Commonwealth Games in Glasgow, Scotland. This marks the country's 23rd participation at the games, since making its debut at the 1930 British Empire Games, the inaugural edition of the event which evolved to become the Commonwealth Games. The team is competing under a new bilingual branding as 'cymru|wales' and 'Tim Cymru|Team Wales' for the first time.

On 19 June 2026, Team Wales announced its team of 114 athletes across 10 sports. A bipartite invitation to the men's and women's 3 x 3 wheelchair basketball event announced on that date means that the Welsh team are represented in ten sports in the 2026 Games.

Boxer Rosie Eccles was the country's opening ceremony flagbearer. Meanwhile, bowler Daniel Salmon was the baton bearer during the opening ceremony.

Track Cyclist Emma Finucane was chosen to be the closing ceremony flagbearer after her historic performance throughout the games.

Emma Finucane became the first ever cyclist to win all four sprint events at the same Commonwealth Games, as well as the first Welsh woman to do so. She won gold in the team sprint, individual sprint, 1000m time trial and keirin while setting a Commonwealth Games record in the team sprint with a 46.760s alongside teammates Lowri Thomas and Rhian Edmunds. Wales ended the Games with a total of 31 medals.

== Administration ==
Former broadcaster Gethin Jones will act as chef de mission and spokesperson for Tim Cymru during the Games, and announced the full squad on 19 June 2026. The team is organised by Commonwealth Games Wales under the chief executive officer Rebecca Edwards-Symmons.

== Medalists ==
Medal	Name	Sport	Event	Date
Gold	Ruby Evans	Artistic gymnastics	Women's floor	28 July
Gold	Aled Davies	Athletics	Men's discus throw F44	29 July
Gold	Rhian Edmunds; Emma Finucane; Lowri Thomas	Track cycling	Women's team sprint	30 July
Gold	Anna Morris	Track cycling	Women's individual pursuit	31 July
Gold	Emma Finucane	Track cycling	Women's sprint	31 July
Gold	Olivia Breen	Athletics	Women's long jump T38	31 July
Gold	Anna Morris	Track cycling	Women's 25km points race	1 August
Gold	Emma Finucane	Track cycling	Women's 1 km time trial	1 August
Gold	Emma Finucane	Track cycling	Women's keirin	2 August
Silver	Ela Letton-Jones	Swimming	Women's 100 m freestyle S13	24 July
Silver	Olivia Breen	Athletics	Women's 100 m T38	27 July
Silver	Matt Richards	Swimming	Men's 100 m freestyle	28 July
Silver	Funmi Oduwaiye	Athletics	Women's discus throw F44	29 July
Silver	Matt Richards	Swimming	Men's 200 m freestyle	29 July
Silver	James Ball; Matt Rotherham (pilot)	Track cycling	Men's tandem 1 km time trial B	30 July
Silver	Orlando Holley-Sotomi	Boxing	Men's 70 kg	1 August
Silver	Connor Williams	Boxing	Men's 90 kg	1 August
Silver	Jessica Roberts	Track cycling	Women's 25km points race	1 August
Silver	James Ball; Matt Rotherham (pilot)	Track cycling	Men's tandem sprint B	1 August
Bronze	Rhys Darbey	Swimming	Men's 200 m freestyle S14	25 July
Bronze	Matt Richards; Dan Jones; Bex Sutton; Theodora Taylor; Harry Milne; Kieran Bird; Medi Harris; Meghan Higgs	Swimming	Mixed 4×100 metre freestyle relay	25 July
Bronze	Matt Richards; Dan Jones; Kieran Birds; Tyler Melbourne-Smith; Harry Milne; Jack Knight; Lewis Fraser	Swimming	Men's 4×200 metre freestyle relay	26 July
Bronze	Abigail Roper	Artistic gymnastics	Women's vault	27 July
Bronze	Emily Roper	Artistic gymnastics	Women's uneven bars	27 July
Bronze	Julie Thomas; Jamie Jones; Steffan James; John Wilson	Bowls	Mixed pairs B2–3	28 July
Bronze	Bree Cronin	Athletics	Women's discus throw F44	29 July
Bronze	Laura Hughes	Weightlifting	Women's 77 kg	29 July
Bronze	Megan Barker; Anna Morris; Ciara Oliva; Jessica Roberts	Track cycling	Women's team pursuit	30 July
Bronze	Rosie Eccles	Boxing	Women's 70 kg	31 July
Bronze	Rhian Edmunds	Track cycling	Women's sprint	31 July
Bronze	Owain Harris-Allen	Boxing	Men's 60 kg	31 July

== Competitors ==
The following is the list of number of competitors participating at the Games per sport/discipline.

Sport	Men	Women	Total
Athletics	6	12	18
Basketball 3x3	4	4	8
Bowls	3	3	6
Boxing	4	3	7
Cycling	11	10	21
Gymnastics	5	5	10
Judo	4	4	8
Netball
12	12		
Swimming	11	10	21
Weightlifting	1	6	7
Total	49	69	118*

- includes 1 pilot and two directors

== Athletics ==
Team Wales announced a squad of eighteen athletes, six men and twelve women, including six para athletes, for the track and field events at the 2026 Games. A controversial omission was new Welsh women's 100 metre record holder Hannah Brier, whose achievement came just outside the early reckoning date.

Key

Ranks given for track events are within the athlete's heat only.

- Q = Qualified for the next round
- q = Qualified for the next round as a fastest loser or, in field events, by position without achieving the qualifying target

Track events

Athlete	Event	Heat		Semifinal		Final	
Athlete	Event	Result	Rank	Result	Rank	Result	Rank
Jeremiah Azu	Men's 100 metres	10.10	1 q	10.00	2 Q	10.03	5
Justin Davies	Men's 800 metres	1:46.98	Q	1:45.51 (SB)	DNQ		
Jake Heyward	Men's Mile run	3:54.18	Q				
Charlotte Henrich	Women's 400 metres	52.13	Q	52.13	Q		
Isabelle Boffey	Women's 800 metres	2:01.53	Q	2:00.24	Q	2:01.44	5
Ava Lloyd	Women's Mile run	4:31.41 (PB)	Q				
Melissa Courtney-Bryant	Women's Mile run		4:39.50 (SB)	DNQ			
Melissa Courtney-Bryant	Women's 5000 metres						
Cari Hughes	Women's 3000 metres steeplechase					9:40.71 (Welsh record)	8

Field events

Athlete	Event	Qualification		Final	
Athlete	Event	Distance	Rank	Distance	Rank
Thomas Walley	Men's pole vault				
Adele Nicoll	Women's shot put			16.33	5
Amber Simpson	Women's hammer throw	59.14	13	Did not advance	

Combined events

Athlete	Event		100 m h	SP	HJ	200 m	LJ	JT	800 m	Final	Rank
Abi Pawlett	Women's heptathlon	Result		Withdrew							
Abi Pawlett	Women's heptathlon	Points									

Para-athletics

Athlete	Event	Heat		Final	
Athlete	Event	Result	Rank	Result	Rank
Olivia Breen	Women's 100 metres (T38)	13.05	2 Q	12.86	(silver)
Olivia Breen	Women's long jump (T38)				(gold)
Fumni Oduwaiye	Women's discus throw (F44)				(silver)
Bree Cronin	Women's discus throw (F44)				(bronze)
Ellie Bowen	Women's shot put (F57)				
Aled Davies	Men's discus throw (F44)			48.38	(gold)
Harrison Walsh	Men's discus throw (F44)				5

== Bowls ==
Team Wales announced its team of six bowlers, and two directors, on 19 June 2026.

Men

Athlete	Event	Group Stage					Semifinal	Final / BM	
Athlete	Event	Opposition Score	Opposition Score	Opposition Score	Opposition Score	Opposition Score	Opposition Score	Opposition Score	Rank
Ross Owen	Singles	Quereshi (PAK); W 2-0	Tolchard (ENG); L 0-2	simpson (JAM); W 2-0	Banks (SCO); L 0-2	Prasad (FIJ); W 2-0	Did not advance		
Ross Owen; Daniel Salmon	Pairs	Niue	Guernsey	Malta	Malaysia; L 0-2	Jersey	Did not advance		

Women

Athlete	Event	Group Stage					Semifinal	Final / BM	
Athlete	Event	Opposition Score	Opposition Score	Opposition Score	Opposition Score	Opposition Score	Opposition Score	Opposition Score	Rank
Amy Williams	Singles	India	South Africa	Isle of Man	Malaysia	Zambia			
Amy Williams; Lauren Gowan	Pairs	Canada; W 2-0	Fiji; W 2-0	Kenya; W 2-0	Botswana; W 2-0	New Zealand; L 1-1*			

Para bowls

Athlete	Event	Group Stage					Semifinal	Final / BM	
Athlete	Event	Opposition Score	Opposition Score	Opposition Score	Opposition Score	Opposition Score	Opposition Score	Opposition Score	Rank
Julie Thomas (Jamie Jones - dir.); Steffan James (John Wilson - dir.)	Mixed pair B2-3	Australia; W 1*-1	England; W 2-0	New Zealand; W 1-1*	South Africa; W 2-0	Scotland; W 1*-1	England		(bronze)

== Basketball 3x3 ==
Wales' men's and women's wheelchair basketball teams received bipartite entries to their respective competitions.

Summary

Team	Event	Group stage				Quarterfinal	Semifinal	Final / BM / CM	
Team	Event	Opposition Score	Opposition Score	Opposition Score	Rank	Opposition Score	Opposition Score	Opposition Score	Rank
Wales; Alex Wilson; Ben Johnson-Rolfe; Dan May; Will Bishop	Men's wheelchair	Malaysia; W 14—13	South Africa; L 16—12	Scotland —		—			
Wales; Anastasia Blease; Chloe Morgan; Libi Phillips; Molly Lander	Women's wheelchair	India; W 16—1	Nigeria; W 17—1	Scotland —		—			

=== Men's wheelchair tournament ===
Group play

Pos	Team	Pld	W	L	PF	PA	PD	Qualification
1	Scotland	3	3	0	54	25	+29	Semi-finals
2	South Africa	3	2	1	38	37	+1	Play-ins
3	Wales	3	1	2	36	50	−14	Play-ins
4	Malaysia	3	0	3	29	45	−16	

Source: Glasgow 2026
Rules for classification: 1) Wins; 2) Head-to-head record; 3) Points scored.

25 July 2026
16:35

Report

Wales	14–13	Malaysia
Pts: May 8		Pts: Zakaria 10

SEC Centre, Glasgow

26 July 2026
17:00

Report

South Africa	16–12	Wales
Pts: Shelembe 6		Pts: Marshall-Wilson 8

SEC Centre, Glasgow

27 July 2026
19:55

Report

Wales	10–21	Scotland
Pts: May 7		Pts: Erskine 13

SEC Centre, Glasgow

=== Women's wheelchair tournament ===
Group play

Pos	Team	Pld	W	L	PF	PA	PD	Qualification
1	Scotland	3	3	0	53	7	+46	Semi-finals
2	Wales	3	2	1	35	18	+17	Quarter-finals
3	Nigeria	3	1	2	9	39	−30	Quarter-finals
4	India	3	0	3	11	44	−33	

Source: Glasgow 2026
Rules for classification: 1) Wins; 2) Head-to-head record; 3) Points scored.

25 July 2026
12:05

Report

Wales	16–1	India
Pts: Blease 7		Pts: Gupta 1

SEC Centre, Glasgow

26 July 2026
19:55

Report

Nigeria	1–17	Wales
Pts: Nwaozuzu 1		Pts: Lander 7

SEC Centre, Glasgow

27 July 2026
17:50

Report

Wales	2–16	Scotland
Pts: Lander 2		Pts: Smith 11

SEC Centre, Glasgow

== Boxing ==
Wales selected seven boxers at the boxing tournament at the 2026 Commonwealth Games

Men

Athlete	Event	Round of 32	Round of 16	Quarterfinals	Semifinals	Final	
Athlete	Event	Opposition Result	Opposition Result	Opposition Result	Opposition Result	Opposition Result	Rank
Owain Harris-Allan	60 kg	bye	Chemben (MRI); W 5—0				
Orlando Holley-Sotomi	70 kg	bye	Hewitt (ENG); W 4—1			(silver)	
Daniel Pitt	80 kg	Ioapo (SAM); W 5—0	Kua Gunua Mua (PNG); W 5—0				
Connor Williams	90 kg	—	Kotze (NAM); W RSC				

Women

Athlete	Event	Round of 16	Quarterfinals	Semifinals	Final	
Athlete	Event	Opposition Result	Opposition Result	Opposition Result	Opposition Result	Rank
Niamh Brookes	51 kg	bye				
Helen Jones	54 kg	Ajishola (NGR); W 3 - 2				
Rosie Eccles	70 kg	—	Ncube (RSA) -			

== Cycling ==
Team Wales announced its squad of 19 cyclists and para cyclists for the velodrome on 19 June 2026

=== Track ===
Sprint

Athlete	Event	Qualification		1/8 Finals	Quarterfinals	Semifinals	Final	
Athlete	Event	Time	Rank	Opposition Time	Opposition Time	Opposition Time	Opposition Time	Rank
Jonah Jenkins	Men's sprint	10.107	19th	DNQ	DNQ	DNQ	DNQ	N/A
Ioan Hepburn	Men's sprint	9.807	11th	Harry Ledingham-Horn L +0.040	DNQ	DNQ	DNQ	N/A
Steffan Lloyd	Men's sprint	9.950	15th	Nicholas Paul L +0.093	DNQ	DNQ	DNQ	N/A
Emma Finucane	Women's sprint	10.322	1st	Rebecca Petch W -0.337	Ellesse Andrews W 2-0	Rhian Edmunds W 2-0	Sophie Capewell W 2-0	(gold)
Lowri Thomas	Women's sprint	10.825	13th	Lauren Bell L +0.066	DNQ	DNQ	DNQ	N/A
Rhian Edmunds	Women's sprint	10.622	5th	Liliya Tatarinoff W -0.039	Lauren Bell W 2-0	Emma Finucane L 2-0	DNQ	N/A
Lewis Oliva; Ioan Hepburn; Jonah Jenkins; Steffan Lloyd	Men's team sprint	44.075	4th	N/A	N/A	N/A	Trinidad and Tobago L - DNS	4th
Emma Finucane; Rhian Edmunds; Lowri Thomas	Women's team sprint	46.972	1st	N/A	N/A	N/A	England W -0.141 (GR)	(gold)
James Ball; Matt Rotherham - (pilot)	Men's tandem sprint B	9.927	3rd	N/A	N/A	New Zealand W 2-0	Scotland L 2-1	(silver)

Keirin

Athlete	Event	1st Round	Repechage	Semifinals	Final
Athlete	Event	Rank	Rank	Rank	Rank
Steffan Lloyd	Men's keirin	4th	2nd	DNQ	N/A
Ioan Hepburn	Men's keirin	6th	3rd	DNQ	N/A
Jonah Jenkins	Men's keirin	3rd	1st	5th	10th
Emma Finucane	Women's keirin	1st	N/A	1st	(gold)
Lowri Thomas	Women's keirin	3rd	3rd	2nd	6th
Rhian Edmunds	Women's keirin	DNF	DNQ	DNQ	N/A

Time trial

Athlete	Event	Time	Rank
Steffan Lloyd	Men's time trial	1:00.638	6th
Rhys Britton	Men's time trial	1:01.939	11th
Jonah Jenkins	Men's time trial	1:02.435	13th
Emma Finucane	Women's time trial	1:05.285	(gold)
Rhian Edmunds	Women's time trial	1:06.978	9th
Megan Barker	Women's time trial	1:06.345	5th
James Ball; Matt Rotherham - (pilot)	Men's tandem time trial B	1:00.546	(silver)

Pursuit

Athlete	Event	Qualification		Final	
Athlete	Event	Time	Rank	Opponent Results	Rank
Rhys Britton	Men's individual pursuit	4:13.063	10th	DNQ	N/A
William Salter	Men's individual pursuit	4:16.617	13th	DNQ	N/A
William Salter; William Roberts; Rory Gravelle; Rhys Britton	Men's team pursuit	3:55.552	4th	New Zealand L +1.753	4th
Anna Morris	Women's individual pursuit	4:25:817	2nd	Josie Knight W -6.141 (GR)	(gold)
Jess Roberts	Women's individual pursuit	4:40.519	10th	DNQ	N/A
Ciara Oliva	Women's individual pursuit	4:33.504	6th	DNQ	N/A
Megan Barker; Anna Morris; Jess Roberts; Ciara Oliva	Women's team pursuit	4:15.514	3rd	England W -7.680	(bronze)

Points race

Athlete	Event	Final	
Athlete	Event	Points	Rank
William Perrett	Men's points race	50	6th
William Roberts	Men's points race	30	11th
William Salter	Men's points race	4	14th
Carys Lloyd	Women's points race		
ABD	Women's points race		
Jessica Roberts	Women's points race	52	(silver)
Anna Morris	66	(gold)	

Scratch race

Athlete	Event	Qualification	Final
William Perrett	Men's scratch race	Qualified	13th
William Roberts	Men's scratch race	Qualified	14th
Rhys Britton	Men's scratch race	Qualified	DNF
Anna Morris	Women's scratch race	N/A	5th
Carys Lloyd	Women's scratch race	N/A	20th
Megan Barker	Women's scratch race	N/A	21st

Elimination race

Athlete	Event	Rank
Rory Gravelle	Men's elimination	10th
William Perrett	Men's elimination	16th
William Roberts	Men's elimination	18th
Anna Morris	Women's elimination	6th
Carys Lloyd	Women's elimination	8th
Jess Roberts	Women's elimination	11th

== Artistic gymnastics ==
Team Wales announced its 10 member gymnastics squad for the Games on 19 June 2026.

Men
Team Final & Individual Qualification

Athlete	Event	Apparatus						Total	Rank
Athlete	Event	F	PH	R	V	PB	HB	Total	Rank
Alexander Niscoveanu	Team	12.150	12.100	11.750	~~12.550~~	13.150	13.200 Q	74.900	12 Q
Elliot Vernon	Team	12.300	12.850	11.700	13.150	13.650 Q	12.700	76.350	11 Q
Henry Lewis	Team	~~12.050~~	12.200	12.100	12.900				
Jacob Edwards	Team	12.850			13.750	~~11.600~~	11.900		
Joe Cemlyn-Jones	Team		~~11.150~~			12.600	~~11.500~~		
Total	Team	37.300	37.150	35.550	39.800	39.400	37.800	227.000	6

Individual Finals

Athlete	Event	Apparatus						Total	Rank
Athlete	Event	FX	PH	SR	VT	PB	HB	Total	Rank
Elliot Vernon	All-around	12.800	13.400	12.450	13.100	11.850	13.000	76.600	9
Alexander Niscoveanu	All-around	12.800	12.450	11.900	13.750	10.350	12.800	74.050	11

Athlete	Apparatus	Score	Rank
Elliot Vernon	Parallel bars	12.700	7
Alexander Niscoveanu	Horizontal bar	11.666	7

Women
Team Final & Individual Qualification

Athlete	Event	Apparatus				Total	Rank
Athlete	Event	V	UB	BB	F	Total	Rank
Abigail Roper	Team	13.450 Q	~~11.100~~	11.650			
Emily Roper	Team	~~13.100~~ Q	13.600 Q	11.100	~~11.800~~	49.600	11 Q
Frances Stone	Team	13.200		~~9.800~~	11.950		
Jemima Taylor	Team		13.300		12.350		
Ruby Evans	Team	14.050	13.300 Q	12.550 Q	12.900 Q	52.800	2 Q
Total	Team	40.700	40.200	35.300	37.200	153.400	4

Individual Finals

Athlete	Event	Apparatus				Total	Rank
Athlete	Event	V	UB	BB	F	Total	Rank
Ruby Evans	All-around	14.100	12.850	10.950	12.950	50.850	6
Emily Roper	All-around	13.300	13.300	12.550	11.200	50.350	7

Athlete	Apparatus	Score	Rank
Abigail Roper	Vault	13.433	3rd place, bronze medalist(s)
Emily Roper	Vault	13.283	4
Emily Roper	Uneven bars	13.666	3rd place, bronze medalist(s)
Jemima Taylor	Uneven bars	11.766	7
Ruby Evans	Balance beam	12.300	7
Ruby Evans	Floor	13.500	(gold)

== Judo ==
Team Wales announced a team of eight judoka, four men and four women, on 19 June 2026

Men

Athlete	Event	Round of 32	Round of 16	Quarterfinals	Semifinals	Repechage	Final/BM	
Athlete	Event	Opposition Result	Opposition Result	Opposition Result	Opposition Result	Opposition Result	Opposition Result	Rank
Joshua Bell
Ben Moore	-73 kg							
Oliver Barratt	-100 kg							
Joshua Whitehouse	+100 kg							

Women

Athlete	Event	Round of 32	Round of 16	Quarterfinals	Semifinals	Repechage	Final/BM	
Athlete	Event	Opposition Result	Opposition Result	Opposition Result	Opposition Result	Opposition Result	Opposition Result	Rank
Ashleigh Barnikel	-48 kg							
Lola Hudson	-52 kg							
Millie Bayliss	-63 kg							
Holly Devall	-70 kg							

== Netball ==
Wales qualified on rankings for the netball competition at the 2026 Commonwealth Games.

Squad

The Team Wales squad for the Commonwealth Games was announced on 30 June 2026.

- Lowri Windsor
- Alex Johnson
- Poppy Tydeman
- Vicky Booth
- Nansi Kuti
- Caris Morgan
- Megan Pilkington
- Zoe Matthewman
- Phillipa Yarranton
- Bethan Dyke
- Leah Middleton
- Georgia Rowe

Summary

Team	Event	Group stage						Semifinal	Final / BM / Cl.	
Team	Event	Opposition Result	Opposition Result	Opposition Result	Opposition Result	Opposition Result	Rank	Opposition Result	Opposition Result	Rank
Wales	Women's tournament	Uganda; 50–59	Scotland; 47–56	Trinidad and Tobago	New Zealand	Jamaica				

Group stage

Pos	Team	Pld	W	D	L	GF	GA	GD	Pts	Qualification
1	New Zealand	5	5	0	0	333	202	+131	10	Semi-finals
2	Jamaica	5	4	0	1	303	195	+108	8	Semi-finals
3	Uganda	5	3	0	2	303	255	+48	6	Classification matches
4	Scotland	5	2	0	3	276	258	+18	4	Classification matches
5	Wales	5	1	0	4	236	284	−48	2	Classification matches
6	Trinidad and Tobago	5	0	0	5	138	395	−257	0	Classification matches

Source: Glasgow 2026

25 July 2026; 16:00	Report	Wales	50–59	Uganda	OVO Hydro; Umpires: Gary Burgess, Ken Metekingi; Reserve umpire: Tania Fink
25 July 2026; 16:00	Report	Scoring by quarter: 13–15, 18–13, 8–17, 11–14			OVO Hydro; Umpires: Gary Burgess, Ken Metekingi; Reserve umpire: Tania Fink
25 July 2026; 16:00	Report	Georgia Rowe 30/30 (100%); Phillipa Yarranton 16/17 (94%); Zoe Matthewman 4/5 (80%)		Shadiah Nassanga 27/27 (100%); Mary Cholhok 23/25 (92%); Alice Isoto 9/9 (100%)	OVO Hydro; Umpires: Gary Burgess, Ken Metekingi; Reserve umpire: Tania Fink

26 July 2026; 9:00	Report	Wales	47–56	Scotland	OVO Hydro; Umpires: Louise Travis, Angela Armstrong-Lush; Reserve umpire: Kate Mann
26 July 2026; 9:00	Report	Scoring by quarter: 8–16, 13–12, 12–15, 14–13			OVO Hydro; Umpires: Louise Travis, Angela Armstrong-Lush; Reserve umpire: Kate Mann
26 July 2026; 9:00	Report	Nansi Kuti 29/30 (97%); Phillipa Yarranton 10/11 (91%); Georgia Rowe 8/9 (89%)		Emma Barrie 39/41 (95%); Niamh McCall 17/20 (85%)	OVO Hydro; Umpires: Louise Travis, Angela Armstrong-Lush; Reserve umpire: Kate Mann

28 July 2026; 16:00	Report	Wales	74–30	Trinidad and Tobago	OVO Hydro; Umpires: Tracy-Ann Griffiths, Kristie Simpson; Reserve umpire: Gary Burgess
28 July 2026; 16:00	Report	Scoring by quarter: 23–8, 20−11, 15–5, 16−6			OVO Hydro; Umpires: Tracy-Ann Griffiths, Kristie Simpson; Reserve umpire: Gary Burgess
28 July 2026; 16:00	Report	Georgia Rowe 31/31 (100%); Nansi Kuti 23/30 (77%); Phillipa Yarranton 10/11 (91%); Zoe Matthewman 10/13 (77%)		Afeisha Noel 15/17 (88%); Makayla Grant 6/7 (86%); Demisha Henry 5/7 (71%); Joelisa Cooper 4/5 (80%)	OVO Hydro; Umpires: Tracy-Ann Griffiths, Kristie Simpson; Reserve umpire: Gary Burgess

29 July 2026; 19:00	Report	New Zealand	65–37	Wales	OVO Hydro; Umpires: Gary Burgess, Justin Barnes; Reserve umpire: Kate Mann
29 July 2026; 19:00	Report	Scoring by quarter: 17–7, 19–8, 15–10, 14–12			OVO Hydro; Umpires: Gary Burgess, Justin Barnes; Reserve umpire: Kate Mann
29 July 2026; 19:00	Report	Martina Salmon 30/35 (86%); Amelia Walsmley 28/30 (93%); Georgia Heffernan 7/8 (88%)		Georgia Rowe 18/19 (95%); Zoe Matthewman 9/9 (100%); Nansi Kuti 5/6 (83%); Phillipa Yarranton 5/7 (71%)	OVO Hydro; Umpires: Gary Burgess, Justin Barnes; Reserve umpire: Kate Mann

30 July 2026; 19:00	Report	Jamaica	74–28	Wales	OVO Hydro; Umpires: Tania Fink, Justin Barnes; Reserve umpire: Ken Metekingi
30 July 2026; 19:00	Report	Scoring by quarter: 13–11, 23–7, 16–5, 22–5			OVO Hydro; Umpires: Tania Fink, Justin Barnes; Reserve umpire: Ken Metekingi
30 July 2026; 19:00	Report	Romelda Aiken-George 26/30 (87%); Shanice Beckford 26/32 (81%); Azara Wilmot 16/19 (84%); Rhea Dixon 6/8 (75%)		Georgia Rowe 18/19 (95%); Phillipa Yarranton 6/8 (75%); Zoe Matthewman 3/3 (100%); Nansi Kuti 1/1 (100%)	OVO Hydro; Umpires: Tania Fink, Justin Barnes; Reserve umpire: Ken Metekingi

== Swimming ==
Team Wales selected a squad of 21 swimmers

Men

Athlete	Event	Heat		Semifinal		Final	
Athlete	Event	Time	Rank	Time	Rank	Time	Rank
Dan Jones	100 metres freestyle						
Kyle Booth	50 metre breaststroke						
Kyle Booth	100 metres breaststroke						
Kieran Bird	200 metres freestyle						
Lewis Fraser	50 metres butterfly						
Lewis Fraser	100 metres butterfly						
Jack Knight	100 metres backstroke						
Joshua Inglis	50 metres breaststroke						
Joshua Inglis	100 metres breaststroke						
Harry Milne	100 metres freestyle						
Matt Richards	100 metres freestyle						(silver)
Matt Richards	200 metres freestye						
Tyler Melbourne-Smith	200 metres freestyle						
Tyler Melbourne-Smith	400 metres freestyle						
Tyler Melbourne-Smith	800 metres freestyle						
Rhys Darbey	200 metres freestyle S14						
Dylan Broom	200 metres freestyle S14						

Women

Athlete	Event	Heat		Semifinal		Final	
Athlete	Event	Time	Rank	Time	Rank	Time	Rank
Alexandra Bastone	200 metres freestyle						
Alexandra Bastone	400 metres freestyle	colspan=2					
Alexandra Bastone	800 metres freestyle						
Amy Crowley	50 metres breaststroke						
Amy Crowley	100 metres breaststroke						
Sophie Davies	100 metres freestyle						
Sophie Davies	200 metres freestyle						
Medi Harris	50 metres backstroke						
Meghan Higgs	50 metres freestyle						
Meghan Higgs	100 metres freestyle						
Rebecca Sutton	50 metres backstroke						
Rebecca Sutton	100 metres backstroke						
Theodora Taylor	50 metres freestyle						
Theodora Taylor	100 metres freestyle						
Theodora Taylor	100 metres breaststroke						
Theodora Taylor	50 metres butterfly						
Ela Letton-Jones	S12	1:04.73	Q			1:04.30	(silver)
Meghan Willis	S9						
Rose Williams	S14	2:14.75	Q	-	-	2:11.29	4

Relays

Athlete	Event	Heat		Final	
Athlete	Event	Time	Rank	Time	Rank
	Men's 4 × 100 m freestyle relay	DSQ			
	Men's 4 × 200 m freestyle relay	Q	7:35.05	(bronze)	7:09.59
	Men's 4 × 100 m medley relay				
	Women's 4 × 100 m freestyle relay				
	Women's 4 × 200 m freestyle relay				
	Women's 4 × 100 m medley relay				
	4 × 100 m mixed freestyle relay	Q	3:31.46	(bronze)	3.38.67

== Weightlifting ==
On 18 May 2026, the IWF Commonwealth Games weightlifting ranking lists were finalised. On publication, Wales had qualified six weightlifters (One man and five women). On 22 June, Charlotte Whalley was awarded a further reallocation space in the women's 63 kg class.

Men

Athlete	Event	Snatch (kg)		Clean & Jerk (kg)		Total (kg)	Rank
Athlete	Event	Result	Rank	Result	Rank	Total (kg)	Rank
James Wales	+110 kg						

Women

Athlete	Event	Snatch (kg)		Clean & Jerk (kg)		Total (kg)	Rank
Athlete	Event	Result	Rank	Result	Rank	Total (kg)	Rank
Nikole Roberts	48 kg						
Madaline Connolly	53 kg						
Catrin Haf Jones	58 kg						
Charlotte Whalley	63 kg						
Chloe Hood	69 kg						
Laura Hughes	77 kg	95 kg		129 kg		224 kg	(bronze)
