= Orlando Holley-Sotomi =

Welsh boxer

Personal information
- Nationality: Wales

Boxing career
Medal record
Men's amateur boxing
Representing Wales
Commonwealth Games
Silver medal – second place	2026 Glasgow	70 kg

Orlando Holley-Sotomi is a Welsh boxer. He competed at the 2026 Commonwealth Games, winning the silver medal in the men's 70 kg event.
