= Track cycling at the 2026 Commonwealth Games – Women's 1 km time trial =

Cycling Track – Women's time trial at the 2026 Commonwealth Games
- Venue: Sir Chris Hoy Velodrome
- Dates: 1 August
- Winning time: 1:05.285

Medalists
gold medal	Emma Finucane	Wales
silver medal	Claudia Marcks	Australia
bronze medal	Ellesse Andrews	New Zealand

The women's time trial at the 2026 Commonwealth Games was part of the cycling programme, and took place on 1 August 2026.

== Records ==
Prior to this competition, the existing world and Games records were as follows:

World record	(Netherlands) Hetty van de Wouw	1:03.121	Peñalolén Velodrome, Santiago	25 October 2025
Games record	not established			

== Schedule ==
The schedule is as follows:

All times are British Summer Time (UTC+1)

Date	Time	Round
Saturday 1 August 2026	16:33	Finals

== Results ==
Rank	Rider	Time	Behind	Notes
1st place, gold medalist(s)	Emma Finucane (WAL)	1:05.285	—	GR
2nd place, silver medalist(s)	Claudia Marcks (AUS)	1:05.607	+0.322	
3rd place, bronze medalist(s)	Ellesse Andrews (NZL)	1:05.737	+0.452	
4	Sophie Capewell (ENG)	1:06.107	+0.822	
5	Megan Barker (WAL)	1:06.345	+1.060	
6	Lauren Bell (SCO)	1:06.368	+1.083	
7	Ellie Stone (SCO)	1:06.877	+1.592	
8	Liliya Tatarinoff (AUS)	1:06.890	+1.605	
9	Rhian Edmunds (WAL)	1:06.978	+1.693	
10	Georgette Rand (ENG)	1:07.021	+1.736	
11	Alessia McCaig (AUS)	1:07.998	+2.713	
12	Nurul Izzah Izzati Mohd Asri (MAS)	1:08.673	+3.388	
13	Maddy Silcock (SCO)	1:12.810	+7.525	
14	Monica Jelimo Kiplagat (KEN)	1:24.462	+19.177	
15	Kendra Masiga (KEN)	1:27.255	+21.970	
16	Josette Umi Kiarie (KEN)	1:31.909	+26.624	
17	Erica Sedzro (GHA)	1:41.965	+36.680	
