= Cycling at the 2022 Commonwealth Games – Women's team pursuit =

Cycling Track – Women's team pursuit at the 2022 Commonwealth Games
- Venue: Lee Valley VeloPark
- Dates: 29 July
- Competitors: 20 from 5 nations
- Winning time: 4:12.234

Medalists
gold medal	Georgia Baker; Sophie Edwards; Chloe Moran; Maeve Plouffe	Australia
silver medal	Ellesse Andrews; Bryony Botha; Michaela Drummond; Emily Shearman	New Zealand
bronze medal	Laura Kenny; Josie Knight; Maddie Leech; Sophie Lewis	England

The women's team pursuit at the 2022 Commonwealth Games was part of the cycling programme, and took place on 29 July 2022.

== Records ==
Prior to this competition, the existing world and Games records were as follows:

World record	Germany (Franziska Brauße, Lisa Brennauer, Lisa Klein, Mieke Kröger)	4:04.242	Izu, Japan	3 August 2021
Games record	Australia (Alexandra Manly, Annette Edmondson, Ashlee Ankudinoff, Amy Cure)	4:15.214	Brisbane, Australia	5 April 2018

== Schedule ==
The schedule is as follows:

All times are British Summer Time (UTC+1)

Date	Time	Round
Friday 29 July 2022	10:14	Qualifying
Friday 29 July 2022	16:41	Finals

== Results ==
=== Qualifying ===
The two fastest teams advance to the gold medal final. The next two fastest teams advance to the bronze medal final.

Rank	Nation	Time	Behind	Notes
1	Australia; Georgia Baker; Sophie Edwards; Chloe Moran; Maeve Plouffe	4:14.605		QG, GR
2	New Zealand; Ellesse Andrews; Bryony Botha; Michaela Drummond; Emily Shearman	4:18.434	+3.829	QG
3	England; Laura Kenny; Josie Knight; Maddie Leech; Sophie Lewis	4:19.841	+5.236	QB
4	Wales; Megan Barker; Ella Barnwell; Anna Morris; Jessica Roberts	4:20.398	+5.793	QB
5	Canada; Ngaire Barraclough; Ariane Bonhomme; Maggie Coles-Lyster; Devaney Collier	4:24.701	+10.096	

=== Finals ===
Rank	Nation	Time	Behind	Notes
Gold medal final
1st place, gold medalist(s)	Australia; Georgia Baker; Sophie Edwards; Chloe Moran; Maeve Plouffe	4:12.234		GR
2nd place, silver medalist(s)	New Zealand; Ellesse Andrews; Bryony Botha; Michaela Drummond; Emily Shearman	4:17.984	+5.750	
Bronze medal final
3rd place, bronze medalist(s)	England; Laura Kenny; Josie Knight; Maddie Leech; Sophie Lewis	4:17.096		
4	Wales; Megan Barker; Ella Barnwell; Anna Morris; Jessica Roberts	4:18.992	+1.796	
