= Sophie Lewis (cyclist) =

British cyclist (born 2002)

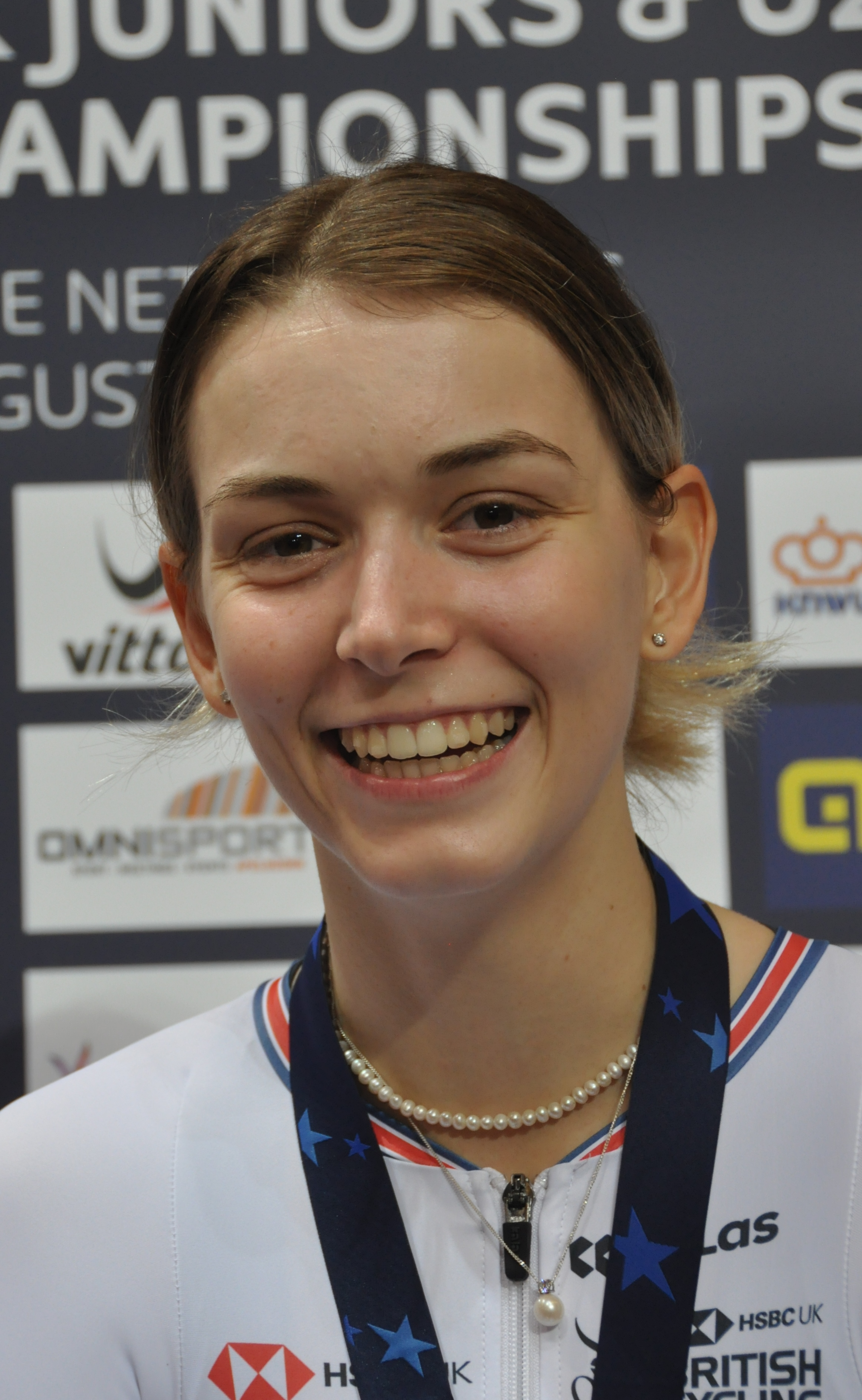
- Lewis in 2021

Personal information
- Born: 17 June 2002 (age 24) England

Cycling career
- Sport: Cycling
- Current team: DAS-Handsling
- Discipline: Track cycling
- Role: Rider
- Rider type: omnium, madison, road
Medal record
Representing Great Britain
Women's track cycling
European Championships
Bronze medal – third place	2025 Heusden-Zolder	Team pursuit

Sophie Lewis (born 2002) is a British and English track cyclist. She won a bronze medal in the women’s team pursuit representing England at the 2022 Commonwealth Games. She was also a bronze medalist in the women’s team pursuit at the 2025 UEC European Track Championships in Belgium.

== Cycling career ==
She was educated at Bedford Girls' School, leaving in 2020 before becoming a member of the Great British Cycling Team full time programme. She was also a former member of Cycle Club Ashwell in Hertfordshire.

In 2022, she won a gold medal to became British champion, when winning the Omnium event at the 2022 British National Track Championships in Newport, Wales. She also won a silver medal at the English Women’s National Madison Championships alongside Maddie Leech, edged out from winning gold in a close finish, losing their lead in the final 20 laps to eventual winners Dame Laura Kenny and Neah Evans. She was selected later that year to represent England at the home-held 2022 Commonwealth Games in Birmingham. Alongside Kenny, Leech, and Josie Knight, she won a bronze medal in the women’s team pursuit at the Games.

She competed at the U23 European Track Championships in Portugal, winning the U23 Team Pursuit alongside Maddie Leech, Grace Lister and Kate Richardson. She also won in the U23 wonen’s Madison with Maddie Leech.

She competed for Great Britain at the 2025 UEC European Track Championships in Heusden-Zolder, Belgium, in February 2025, winning a bronze medal in the women's team pursuit race.

== Major results ==
=== Track ===
2022
National Championships

1st Omnium
2nd Madison (with Maddie Leech)

3rd Team pursuit, Commonwealth Games
2023
UEC European Under-23 Championships

1st Team pursuit
1st Madison (with Maddie Leech)

2024
UEC European Under-23 championships

1st Team pursuit
1st Elimination

2025
UEC European Track Championships

3rd Team pursuit
