= Emily Shearman =

New Zealand cyclist (born 1999)

Personal information
- Born: 23 February 1999 (age 27) Palmerston North, New Zealand
- Height: 1.68 m (5 ft 6 in)
- Weight: 64 kg (141 lb)

Cycling career
- Sport: Cycling
- Discipline: Track Cycling
Medal record
Women's track cycling
Representing New Zealand
Olympic Games
Silver medal – second place	2024 Paris	Team pursuit
World Championships
Silver medal – second place	2023 Glasgow	Team pursuit
Commonwealth Games
Silver medal – second place	2022 Birmingham	Team pursuit
Silver medal – second place	2026 Glasgow	Team pursuit
Junior World Championships
Silver medal – second place	2017 Montichiari	Team pursuit
Silver medal – second place	2016 Aigle	Team pursuit

Emily Shearman (born 23 February 1999) is a New Zealand racing cyclist. She represented her country at the 2022 Commonwealth Games, winning a silver medal in the team pursuit. On 7 August 2024, she won a silver medal in the team pursuit during the 2024 summer Olympic Games with Ally Wollaston, Bryony Botha and Nicole Shields.

She won silver medals in the team pursuit at the 2016 and 2017 Junior World Championships. She competed at the 2019/2020 World Cup and 2019/2020 Oceania Championships winning gold in the team pursuit. She won silver in the team pursuit at 2023 World Championships.
