= Emma Jeffers =

Irish cyclist (born 2004)

- Jeffers in 2024

Personal information
- Born: 11 November 2004 (age 21) Eccleston, England

Cycling career
- Sport: Cycling
- Current team: Liv AlUla Jayco
- Disciplines: Road, Track
- Role: Rider

Professional teams
- 2023: DAS-Handsling
- 2024–: Liv AlUla Jayco

Emma Jeffers (born 11 November 2004) is an Irish professional road racing cyclist, who currently rides for UCI Women's WorldTeam Liv AlUla Jayco. She won the British National Circuit Race Championships in 2024, prior to declaring for Ireland that year.

== Career ==
Jeffers started BMX racing at the age of four years-old. She won European Cup races in 2018 and placed second at age-group level at the British and World championships. She took part in her first international road race in 2019 before joining JRC-Interflon Race Team. In 2021, she placed second to Millie Couzens in the British junior women's race at the British National Road Race Championships.

Continuing as a junior rider, Jeffers won the Grand Prix de Plouay in 2022. Also in the 2022 season, she placed fourth at junior Gent-Wevelgem. She also had a stage victory at Rás na mBan in 2023. She rode for British Continental team, DAS-Handsling, prior to being recruited by the Liv-AlUla-Jayco development team for the 2024 season. In April, she secured her first UCI level win at the 2024 Gracia Orlová in the Czech Republic. In June 2024, Jeffers won her first elite national title at the British National Circuit Race Championships in Darlington.

Jeffers declared for Ireland at the age of 20 years-old. Jeffers won the Irish under-23 national championships in June 2026. Jeffers made her Commonwealth Games debut for Northern Ireland in 2026 in Glasgow, Scotland. She competed for Ireland at the 2026 UCI Track Cycling World Championships in Shanghai, China, taking part in the Elimination Race and Team Pursuit.

== Personal life ==
From Lancashire, her brother Cameron Jeffers is also a competitive cyclist.
