= Ciara Horne =

British (and former Irish) racing cyclist

Ciara Oliva
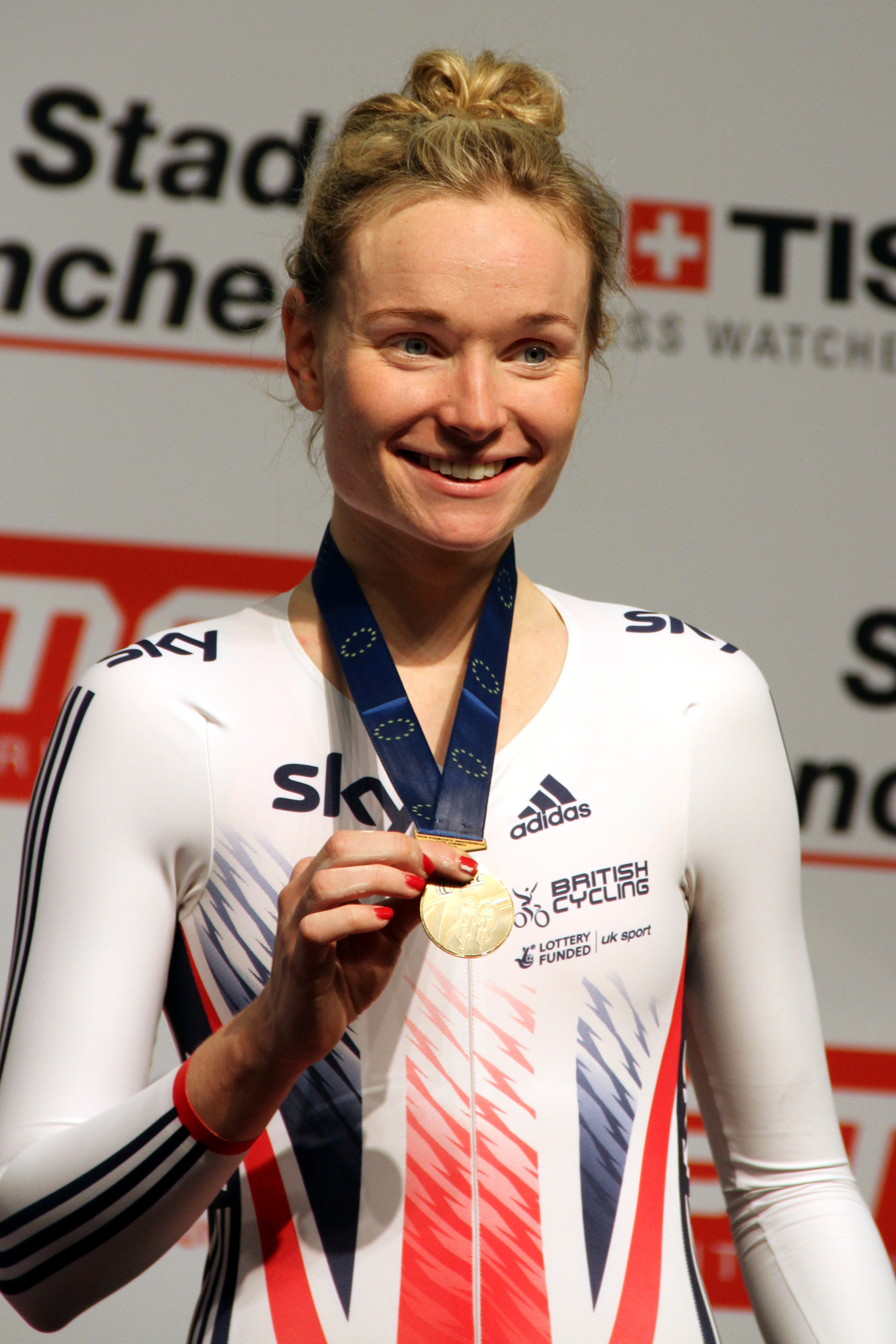
- Horne at the 2015 UEC European Track Championships

Personal information
- Full name: Ciara Maurizia Oliva
- Born: Ciara Maurizia Horne; 17 September 1989 (age 37)
- Height: 1.79 m (5 ft 10 in)
- Weight: 60 kg (132 lb; 9 st 6 lb)

Cycling career
- Sport: Cycling
- Current team: Team USN / Pearl Izumi Sports Tours International
- Disciplines: Track & Road
- Role: Rider
- Rider type: Endurance

Amateur team
- 2013: Breast Cancer Care

Professional team
- 2014–: Pearl Izumi Sports Tours International
Medal record
Women's track cycling
Representing Great Britain
World Championships
| Bronze medal – third place | 2016 London | Team pursuit |
European Championships
| Gold medal – first place | 2014 Guadeloupe | Team pursuit |
| Gold medal – first place | 2015 Grenchen | Team pursuit |
| Bronze medal – third place | 2015 Grenchen | Individual pursuit |
Women's road cycling
Representing Cervélo–Bigla Pro Cycling
World Championships
| Bronze medal – third place | 2016 Doha | Team time trial |
Representing Wales
Commonwealth Games
| Bronze medal – third place | 2026 Glasgow | Team pursuit |

Ciara Oliva née Ciara Maurizia Horne (born 17 September 1989) is a British racing cyclist. Having formerly represented Ireland at an international level, Horne has switched nationality and currently rides on the track for the Welsh Cycling backed Team USN, and also races on the road for the Breast Cancer Care racing team. Horne formed part of the Great Britain team who became 2014 European champions in the team pursuit.

== Career ==
Horne was brought up in Kenilworth, near Coventry, Warwickshire, and attended Stratford Girls' Grammar School, Horne obtained a First Class degree in physiotherapy from the University of Birmingham in 2013.

Horne began her sporting life at the age of 7 as a swimmer. She competed at the national level until the age of 16 when she suffered a serious shoulder injury which required surgery. This prompted her to switch to triathlon, getting onto the world class start programme and competing at the Salford Junior world cup where she finished eighth. Affected by injuries, Horne found that the majority of her training would be in the form of cycling and her love for the sport was born. Horne joined a cycling team in October 2009.

Horne qualified to represent Ireland through her mother. In July 2012, Horne renounced her Irish citizenship. Having held dual nationality, Horne qualified for a British racing licence through British Cycling. Horne's father was born in Barry, Vale of Glamorgan, Wales, she was offered the opportunity to train with the Welsh Cycling Squad.

Horne represented Wales at the Commonwealth Games in Glasgow, 2014, competing in the time trial and individual pursuit.

She is married to racing cyclist Lewis Oliva. The couple have three children.

She came out of retirement to compete under her married name of Ciara Oliva at the 2026 Commonwealth Games in Glasgow. At the Games, Horne, along with Anna Morris, Megan Barker and Jessica Roberts, won the bronze medal for Wales after defeating England in the team pursuit. Shortly thereafter Oliva came out of retirement fully and rejoined the Great Britain team.

== Major results ==
=== Road ===
2012
4th Time trial, British National Championships
2015
2nd Overall Tour of the Reservoir
5th Time trial, British National Championships
2016
3rd Team time trial, UCI World Championships

=== Track ===
2011
Irish National Championships

2nd 500m time trial
2nd Individual pursuit
2nd Scratch

2012
2nd Team pursuit, UCI World Cup, Cali
2013
Revolution Series

1st Scratch
3rd Points Race

3rd Team pursuit, UCI World Cup, Aguascalientes
2014
1st Team pursuit, UEC European Championships
UCI World Cup

1st Team pursuit, Guadalajara
1st Team pursuit, London

2nd Team pursuit, British National Championships
2015
UEC European Championships

1st Team pursuit
3rd Individual pursuit

British National Championships

1st Team pursuit
3rd Individual pursuit

2nd Individual pursuit, Revolution Series, Derby
2016
3rd Team pursuit, UCI World Championships
2026
3rd Team pursuit, Commonwealth Games
