= Maeve Plouffe =

Australian cyclist (born 1999)

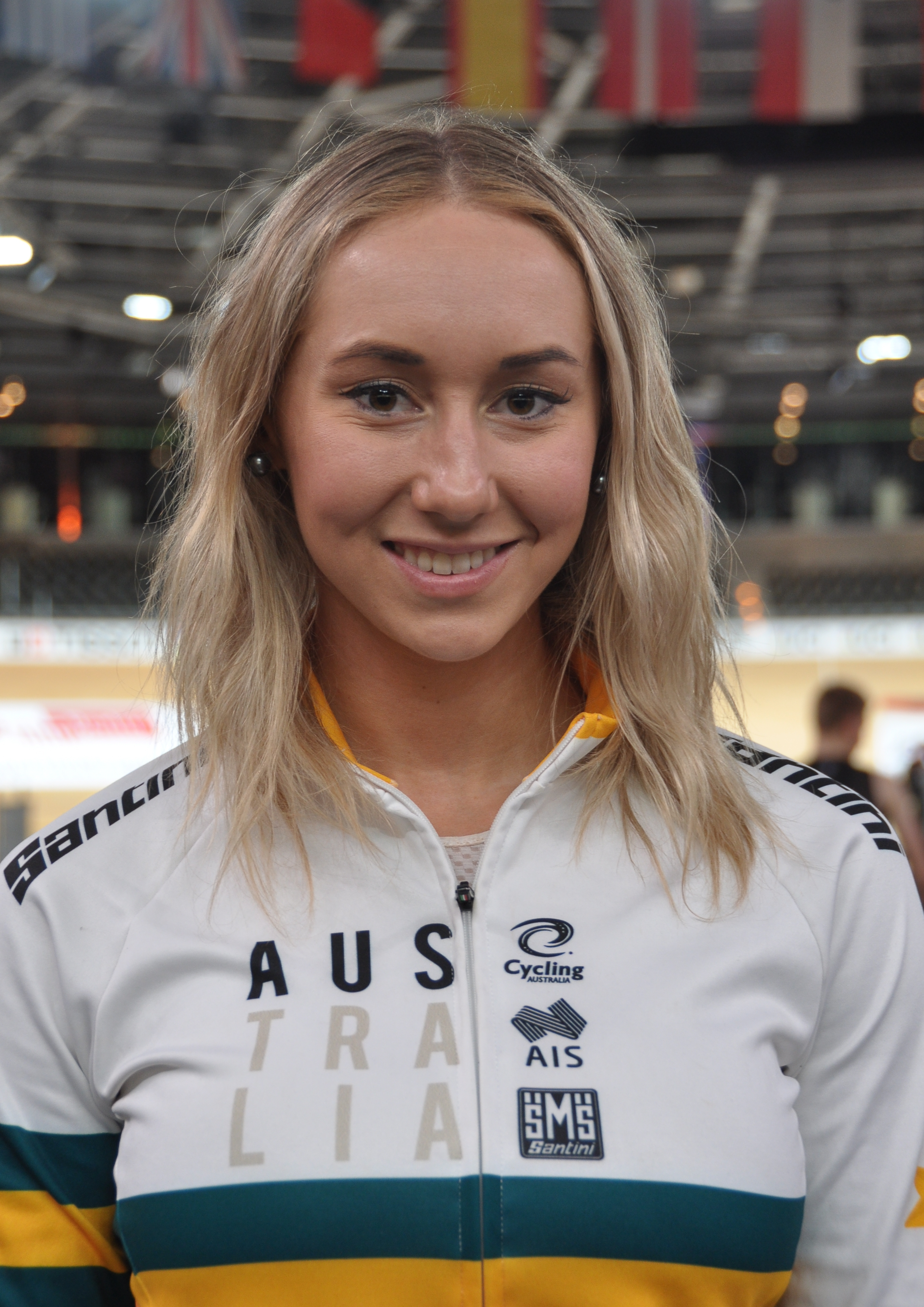
- Maeve Plouffe (2020)

Personal information
- Born: 8 July 1999 (age 27)

Cycling career
- Sport: Cycling
- Current team: Hess Cycling Team
- Role: Rider

Amateur team
- 2025–: Hess Cycling Team

Professional team
- 2023–2024: Team DSM
Medal record
Women's track cycling
Representing Australia
Commonwealth Games
Gold medal – first place	2022 Birmingham	Team pursuit
Silver medal – second place	2022 Birmingham	Individual pursuit

Maeve Plouffe (born 8 July 1999) is an Australian professional racing cyclist for Hess Cycling Team. She was selected on the Australian women's track endurance squad for the 2020 Summer Olympics and the 2024 Summer Olympics. She is the current Australian record holder for both the Team Pursuit and the 3000m Individual Pursuit, in which she was the third woman in history to break the 3:20 barrier. At the 2022 Commonwealth Games, Plouffe won the gold medal in the women's team pursuit event alongside Sophie Edwards, Chloe Moran and Georgia Baker, setting a games record time of 4:14.06. In the same year, she also won a silver medal in the Individual pursuit.

== Early cycling career ==
Plouffe was introduced to track cycling by a South Australian Sports Institute talent identification program from a background of swimming and surf life saving. She exhibited an early aptitude for the road time trial, winning the event as an U17 in her first year competing at the Australian Junior Road National Championships and again as an U19 in the Oceania Road Cycling Championships. Maeve made her international debut in the 2017 UCI Junior Track Cycling World Championships.

== Elite career ==
Plouffe made her international elite debut at nineteen years of age in the opening round of the 2018–19 UCI Track Cycling World Cup women's points race in Saint-Quentin-en-Yvelines, France. She represented Australia again at the UCI Track Cycling World Cup in Hong Kong, before returning to Australia to win three elite Australian Championship titles in the individual pursuit, team pursuit and madison. In the 2020 season Maeve Plouffe became Oceania champion in the scratch race and won two silver and two bronze medals. Only three months prior to the championships, she underwent an operation on her wrist as a result of a fall in a street race in Belgium. In the 2019–20 UCI Track Cycling World Cup season, Maeve's team won a silver medal and set a new Australian record in the women's team pursuit in Cambridge, New Zealand, before winning a gold medal in the women's team pursuit in Brisbane, Australia. Her performances gained her selection for the UCI Track World Championships in Berlin, where she rode in the women's team pursuit event and the women's individual pursuit event. The team consisting of Ashlee Ankudinoff, Georgia Baker, Annette Edmondson, Alexandra Manly, Maeve Plouffe finished fifth.

Plouffe was the youngest member of the women’s cycling team at her Olympic debut in Tokyo in 2021 where she was a member of the team pursuit squad that finished fifth. In 2022, she won gold in the Individual Pursuit at the UCI Track Nations Cup in Milton. At the 2022 Commonwealth Games, Plouffe won the gold medal in the Team Pursuit and silver in the Individual Pursuit, setting Commonwealth Games records in the process. After a successful season on both the track and road, including being named Australian Track Cyclist of the Year, she went on to race in the UCI Women's World Tour with Team DSM in 2023 and 2024. In 2024 Plouffe raced at her second Olympic Games in Paris.

== Personal life ==
In 2020, Plouffe was studying a double degree in law and science, with double majors in marine biology and ecology at the University of Adelaide.
