= Alyssa Polites =

Australian track cyclist (born 2003)

Personal information
- Born: 2 February 2003 (age 23) Melbourne, Australia

Cycling career
- Sport: Cycling
- Discipline: Track cycling
- Role: Rider
Medal record
Representing Australia
Women's track cycling
Commonwealth Games
Gold medal – first place	2026 Glasgow	Team pursuit
Gold medal – first place	2026 Glasgow	Elimination race

Alyssa Polites (born 2 February 2003) is an Australian track cyclist. She won two gold medals at the 2026 Commonwealth Games, with victory in the elimination race and as a member of the Australian team pursuit.

== Career ==
From Melbourne, she took up cycling as a 12 year-old and competed as a member of Caulfield Carnegie Cycling Club. She won the Australian junior national time trial and road race titles at the 2021 Australian road championships. In 2022, she won the under-23 road race title at the age of 18 years-old, as well as placing third overall in the Senior race and silver in the under-23 individual time trial. That year, she also won the Australian national Madison title on the track alongside Maeve Plouffe. Polites competed for Australia at the 2022 Commonwealth Games, placing eighteenth in the scratch race.

Polites signed a 2 year WorldTour contract with Jayco-AlUla at the age of 19 years-old but suffered from injury and illness including a ruptured spleen in a crash at the first women edition of the Tour l’Avenir.

Polites competed for Australia at the 2025 Santos Tour Down Under winning the Queen of the mountain classification, before later representing Australia at the 2025 UCI Track Cycling World Championships in Santiago, Chile. She was selected to ride for Australia at the 2026 Commonwealth Games in Glasgow, Scotland, winning the gold medal in the team pursuit on 30 July. Later at the Games, Polites also became a gold medallist with victory in the elimination race.

== Personal life ==
Born in Australia, Polites is of Greek, Italian and Yugoslavian descent. She is studying for a Bachelor of Exercise and Sport (Science) and Bachelor of Business (Sport Management) at Deakin University.
