= Alexandra Volstad =

Canadian cyclist (born 2006)

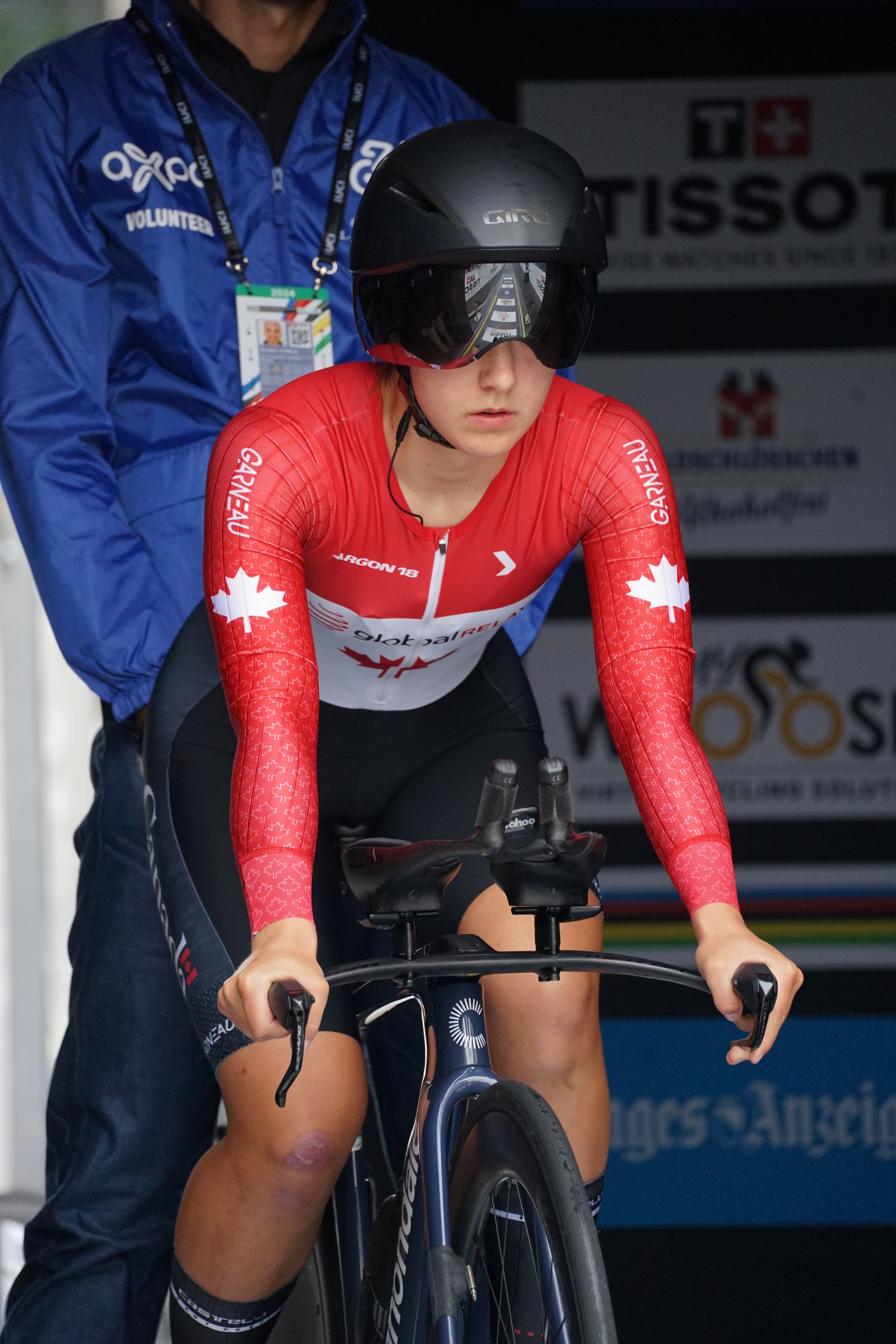
- Volstad at the 2024 UCI Road World Championships

Personal information
- Born: 3 January 2006 (age 20) Calgary, Canada

Cycling career
- Sport: Cycling
- Current team: EF Education–Oatly
- Discipline: Road
- Role: Rider

Professional team
- 2025–: EF Education–Oatly

Alexandra Volstad (born 3 January 2006) is a Canadian professional racing cyclist, who currently rides for the UCI Women's ProTeam EF Education–Oatly.

== Career ==
A native of Calgary, Volstad was initially a speed-skater before becoming a cyclist when she was looking for a summer sport. A member of the Canadian Sport Institute as a youngster, she raced track, road and mountain biking, before making a name for herself by winning several junior titles in Canada.

She then joined EF-Oatly-Cannodale in 2025, turning down an offer to study engineering at university to pursue her professional career.
