= Claudia Marcks =

Australian track cyclist (born 2003)

Personal information
- Born: 14 November 2003 (age 22)

Cycling career
- Sport: Cycling
- Discipline: Track cycling
- Role: Rider
Medal record
Representing Australia
Women's track cycling
Commonwealth Games
Gold medal – first place	2026 Glasgow	Team pursuit
Silver medal – second place	2026 Glasgow	1 km TT

Claudia Marcks (born 14 November 2003) is an Australian track cyclist. She is the a Australian record holder in the 1000 km time trial and won two medals at the 2026 Commonwealth Games, including a gold medal in the team pursuit.

== Career ==
Marcks is a member of The Canberra Cycling Club. In March 2025, Marcks became the inaugural elite women's 1000m time trial Australian national champion.

Marcks was a member of the gold medal winning Australian women's pursuit team which won the 2026 Oceania Track Championships in New Zealand. She was selected to ride for Australia at the 2026 Commonwealth Games in Glasgow, Scotland, winning the gold medal in the team pursuit on 30 July. Later at the Games, she won a silver medal in the 1000 metres individual time trial, setting a new Australian record time of 1:05.607 to finish runner-up to Emma Finucane.

== Personal life ==
Her parents are Olympic gold medallist rower Megan Marcks and former Australian Paralympic rowing coach Gordon Marcks.
