= Sophie Edwards =

Australian track cyclist (born 2000)

Personal information
- Born: 25 February 2000 (age 26) Adelaide, South Australia

Cycling career
- Sport: Cycling
- Disciplines: Track cycling, road cycling
- Role: Rider
Medal record
Women's track cycling
Representing Australia
Commonwealth Games
Gold medal – first place	2026 Glasgow	Team pursuit
Gold medal – first place	2022 Birmingham	Team pursuit

Sophie Edwards (born 25 February 2000) is an Australian track and road cyclist. She is a two-time gold medalist representing Australia in the team pursuit at the Commonwealth Games

== Career ==
Edwards set a new Australian record in the individual pursuit at the Junior Track World Championships in 2018. Edwards was a gold medalist at the 2022 Commonwealth Games in the Women’s Team Pursuit competition.

On 30 July 2026, Edwards races as part of the Australian team pursuit team that qualified for the final at the 2026 Commonwealth Games in Glasgow, Scotland, alongside Felicity Wilson-Haffenden, Claudia Marcks and Alyssa Polites, with the team ultimately winning the gold medal. She also competed in the individual pursuit at the Games but was disqualified following random post-race equipment checks by official which deemed she had too much padding in her helmet, with teammate Wilson-Haffenden also disqualified for strapping tape to her shoulders to alleviate discomfort which was deemed to have constituted a "morphological change".

== Major results ==
2017
3rd Time trial, National Junior Road Championships
2018
National Junior Road Championships

3rd Time trial,
3rd Road race

2022
7th GP Mazda Schelkens
2023
1st Road race Oceania Continental Road Championships
