= Georgia Baker =

Australian cyclist (born 1994)

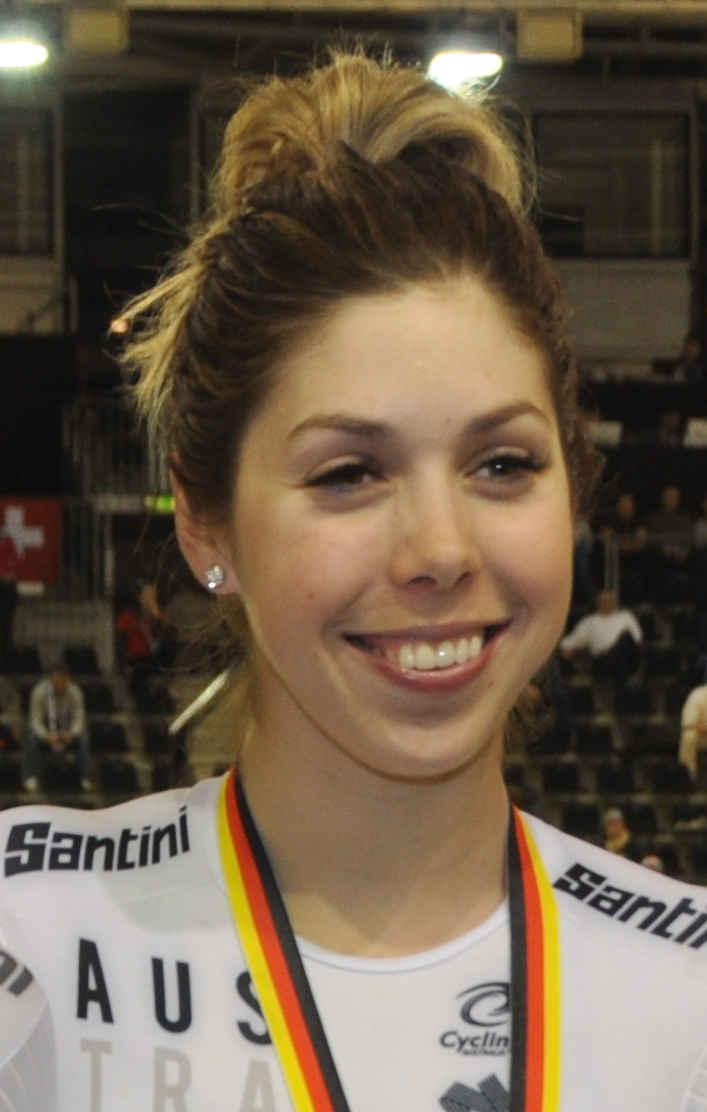
- Baker in 2018

Personal information
- Born: 21 September 1994 (age 32) Launceston, Tasmania, Australia
- Height: 1.79 m (5 ft 10 in)
- Weight: 66 kg (146 lb)

Cycling career
- Sport: Cycling
- Current team: Liv AlUla Jayco
- Disciplines: Track; Road
- Role: Rider
- Rider type: Track Endurance

Amateur teams
- ?: Northern Districts Cycling Club
- 2013: Team Polygon Australia
- 2014: Jayco/Apollo VIS

Professional teams
- 2014: Wiggle–Honda
- 2015–2016: High5 Dream Team
- 2017: Orica–Scott
- 2018: TIS Racing
- 2022–: Team BikeExchange–Jayco
Medal record
Representing Australia
Women's track cycling
World Championships
Gold medal – first place	2019 Pruszków	Team pursuit
Silver medal – second place	2019 Pruszków	Madison
Silver medal – second place	2023 Glasgow	Points race
Silver medal – second place	2023 Glasgow	Madison
Commonwealth Games
Gold medal – first place	2022 Birmingham	Points race
Gold medal – first place	2022 Birmingham	Team pursuit
Women's road bicycle racing
World Championships
Bronze medal – third place	2022 Wollongong	Mixed team relay
Commonwealth Games
Gold medal – first place	2022 Birmingham	Road race

Georgia Baker (born 21 September 1994) is an Australian professional racing cyclist. She rode in the women's team pursuit at the 2016 UCI Track Cycling World Championships.

== Cycling career ==
After taking a break from road racing in 2016 with the High5 Dream Team to focus on her Rio Olympics campaign, Baker signed for Orica-Scott to race in the Women's World Tour team for 2017. In her first European race for the team at the end of May, Baker was among the 90 non-finishers of 121 that started at Gooik–Geraardsbergen–Gooik.

Baker withdrew from the 2017 Women's Tour on the opening stage after experiencing a racing heart and sharp pains in her chest and arm. She was diagnosed with supraventricular tachycardia, which is not a life-threatening condition, but needed to be treated to continue as an athlete. She had surgery in early August, and resumed training for a mixed road and track season in the run-up to the 2018 Commonwealth Games. Following the successful surgery, Baker undertook a three-month training block in Australia before racing at the Oceania Track Championships in November 2017.

Baker qualified for the Tokyo 2020 Olympics. She was a member of the women's pursuit team. The team, consisting of Ashlee Ankudinoff, Georgia Baker, Annette Edmondson, Alexandra Manly and Maeve Plouffe, finished fifth.

At the 2022 Commonwealth Games, Baker won the gold medal in the women's team pursuit event alongside Sophie Edwards, Chloe Moran and Maeve Plouffe, setting a games record time of 4:14.06.

== Major results ==
=== Track ===
2014
2nd Team pursuit, Oceania Track Championships
2015
Oceania Track Championships

1st Individual Pursuit
1st Omnium
2nd Points race
2nd Team pursuit

2nd Madison, Austral (with Danielle McKinnirey)
2016
1st Points race, Oceania Track Championships

=== Road ===
2022
1st Road race, Commonwealth Games
1st Stage 2 Thüringen Ladies Tour
3rd Team relay, UCI Road World Championships
4th Scheldeprijs
7th GP Oetingen
8th UCI Road World Championships – Women's time trial
2023
6th Tour of Chongming Island
9th Time trial, National Road Championships
2024
5th Classic Brugge–De Panne Women
8th Time trial, National Road Championships
2025
2nd Schwalbe Women's One Day Classic
3rd Surf Coast Classic
4th Classic Brugge–De Panne Women
5th Le Samyn
2026
7th Copenhagen Sprint
