= England at the 2026 Commonwealth Games =

- Flag of England
- CG code: ENG
- CGA: Commonwealth Games England
- Website: teamengland.org

in Glasgow, Scotland 23 July 2026 – 2 August 2026
- Flag bearer (opening): Sian Honnor
- Baton bearer: Luke Greenbank
- Flag bearer (closing): Mark Swan
- Medals Ranked 2nd: Gold 29 Silver 45 Bronze 36 Total 110

Commonwealth Games appearances (overview)
- 1930; 1934; 1938; 1950; 1954; 1958; 1962; 1966; 1970; 1974; 1978; 1982; 1986; 1990; 1994; 1998; 2002; 2006; 2010; 2014; 2018; 2022; 2026; 2030

England competed at the 2026 Commonwealth Games in Glasgow between 23 July and 2 August 2026. Having competed at every Games since their 1930 inauguration, it was England's twenty-third appearance.

Bowler Sian Honnor was the country's opening ceremony flagbearer. Meanwhile, swimmer Luke Greenbank was the baton bearer during the opening ceremony. Para powerlifter Mark Swan served as the country's closing ceremony flagbearer.

England finished second in the medal table behind Australia with 29 gold medals, 45 silver medals and 36 bronze medals.

== Administration ==
Commonwealth Games England announced that Jonny Riall had been appointed Chef de Mission for the England team in Glasgow. Prior to his appointment, when the Games were originally planned for Victoria, Australia, Francesca Carter-Kelly had been appointed to the role, but moved on to become Commonwealth Games England Director of Sport and Performance.

== Medalists ==
Medal	Name	Sport	Event	Date
Gold	Mark Swan	Para powerlifting	Men's lightweight	24 July
Gold	Georgia Sheffield	Swimming	Women's 200 metre freestyle S14	25 July
Gold	William Ellard	Swimming	Men's 200 metre freestyle S14	25 July
Gold	Alice Tai	Swimming	Women's 100 metre backstroke S9	26 July
Gold	Luke Whitehouse	Gymnastics	Men's Floor	27 July
Gold	Sophie Hahn	Athletics	Women's T37/38 100 metres	27 July
Gold	Brock Whiston	Swimming	Women's 100 metre breaststroke SB8	27 July
Gold	Thomas Young	Athletics	Men's T37/38 100 metres	27 July
Gold	Sian Honnor; Amy Pharaoh	Bowls	Women's pairs	28 July
Gold	Sam Tolchard	Bowls	Men's singles	28 July
Gold	Charlotte Moore; Joy Hatzelden; Jade Atkin; Lucy Robinson	3x3 basketball	Women's wheelchair	29 July
Gold	Jamell Anderson; Ashley Hamilton; Dwayne Lautier-Ogunleye; Evan Walshe	3x3 basketball	Men's	29 July
Gold	Emily Campbell	Weightlifting	Women's +86 kg	30 July
Gold	Henry Hobbs; Charlie Tanfield; Ethan Vernon; William Tidball; Josh Charlton*	Cycling	Men's team pursuit	30 July
Gold	Zac Shaw	Athletics	Men's 100m T12	30 July
Gold	Acelya Toprak	Judo	Women's -57kg	31 July
Gold	Georgia Hunter Bell	Athletics	Women's 800m	31 July
Gold	Nathan Maguire	Athletics	Men's 1500m T54	1 August
Gold	Sacha Hickey	Boxing	Women's 65kg	1 August
Gold	Patris Mughalzai	Boxing	Men's 65kg	1 August
Gold	Issac Okoh	Boxing	Men's 90kg	1 August
Gold	Ethan Nairne	Judo	Men's -73 kg	1 August
Gold	Kelly Paterson-Pollard	Judo	Women's -70 kg	1 August
Gold	Henry Hobbs	Cycling	Men's scratch race	1 August
Gold	Damar Thomas	Boxing	Men's 90+kg	1 August
Gold	Jazmin Sawyers	Athletics	Women's long jump	1 August
Gold	Katherine Rednall	Bowls	Women's singles	2 August
Gold	Emma Reid	Judo	Women's -78kg	2 August
Gold	Matthew Robertson	Cycling	Men's individual pursuit C1–C3	2 August
Silver	Matthew Harding	Para powerlifting	Men's heavyweight	24 July
Silver	Eva Okaro; Freya Colbert; Leah Schlosshan; Freya Anderson; Abbie Wood*; Erin Little*; Darcy Revitt*; Amalie Smith*	Swimming	Women's 4 × 100 metre freestyle relay	24 July
Silver	Luke Whitehouse; Alexander Yolshin-Cash; Adam Tobin; Joshua Nathan; Gabriel Langton	Gymnastics	Men's artistic team all-around	24 July
Silver	Jacob Mills; James Guy; Gabriel Shepherd; Jacob Whittle; Edward Mildred*; Cameron Brooker*; Oliver Morgan*; Tom Dean*	Swimming	Men's 4 × 100 metre freestyle relay	24 July
Silver	Oliver Morgan	Swimming	Men's 50 metre backstroke	25 July
Silver	Poppy Maskill	Swimming	Women's 200 metre freestyle S14	25 July
Silver	Jacob Mills; Jacob Whittle; Freya Colbert; Freya Anderson; Gabriel Shepherd*; Erin Little*; Abbie Wood*; Tom Dean*	Swimming	Mixed 4 × 100 metre freestyle relay	25 July
Silver	Oliver Morgan	Swimming	Men's 200 metre backstroke	26 July
Silver	James Guy; Tom Dean; Max Litchfield; Gabriel Shepherd; Cameron Brooker*; Jacob Whittle*; Jacob Mills*	Swimming	Men's 4 × 200 metre freestyle relay	26 July
Silver	Abigail Martin	Gymnastics	Women's Vault	27 July
Silver	Amalie Smith	Swimming	Women's 400 metre individual medley	27 July
Silver	Freya Colbert; Abbie Wood; Leah Schlosshan; Freya Anderson	Swimming	Women's 4 × 200 metre freestyle relay	27 July
Silver	Sam Bennett	Athletics	Men's 110 metre hurdles	27 July
Silver	Ron Homer; Sally-Ann Lewis-Wall	Bowls	Mixed pairs B2-3	28 July
Silver	Luke Whitehouse	Gymnastics	Men's vault	28 July
Silver	Abigail Martin	Gymnastics	Women's floor	28 July
Silver	Sarah Davies	Weightlifting	Women's 63kg	28 July
Silver	Amy Hunt	Athletics	Women's 100 metres	28 July
Silver	Isabella Brown	Weightlifting	Women's 77kg	29 July
Silver	Thomas Harvey; Peter Cusack; James Hazell; Oscar Knight	3x3 basketball	Men's wheelchair	29 July
Silver	Oliver Morgan	Swimming	Men's 100 metre backstroke	29 July
Silver	James Guy	Swimming	Men's 200 metre freestyle	29 July
Silver	Madias Ngake	Weightlifting	Women's 86kg	29 July
Silver	Jade O'Dowda	Athletics	Heptathlon	29 July
Silver	Elise Thorner	Athletics	Women's 3000 metre steeplechase	29 July
Silver	Adam Peaty; Jacob Mills; Edward Mildred; Oliver Morgan; Luke Greenbank*; Jacob Peters*; Gregory Butler*; Jacob Whittle*	Swimming	Men's 4 × 100 metre medley relay	29 July
Silver	Cyrille Tchatchet II	Weightlifting	Men's 110kg	30 July
Silver	Morgan Newberry	Cycling	Women's individual pursuit C4–5	30 July
Silver	Sophie Capewell; Katy Marchant; Rhianna Parris-Smith	Cycling	Women's team sprint	30 July
Silver	Harry Ledingham-Horn; Hamish Turnbull; Joe Truman	Cycling	Men's team sprint	30 July
Silver	Josie Knight	Cycling	Women's individual pursuit	31 July
Silver	Sophie Capewell	Cycling	Women's sprint	31 July
Silver	Emily Newnham	Athletics	Women's 400m hurdles	31 July
Silver	Jake Minshull	Athletics	Men's 400m hurdles	31 July
Silver	Daniel Sidbury	Athletics	Men's 1500m T54	1 August
Silver	Sophie Hahn	Athletics	Women's 200m T38	1 August
Silver	Benjamin Levy	Judo	Men's -73 kg	1 August
Silver	Ruby White	Boxing	Women's 51kg	1 August
Silver	Chantelle Reid	Boxing	Women's 75kg	1 August
Silver	Dimiji Shittu	Boxing	Men's 80kg	1 August
Silver	Ben Jefferies; Toby Harries; Yemi Mary John; Lina Nielsen; Poppy Malik*; Laviai Nielsen*	Athletics	Mixed 4x400m relay	1 August
Silver	Nick Brett; Jamie Walker	Bowls	Men's pairs	2 August
Silver	Joe Truman	Cycling	Men's 1 km time trial	2 August
Silver	Max Gregory	Judo	Men's -100kg	2 August
Silver	Kadeena Cox	Cycling	Women's 1 km time trial C4–5	2 August
Bronze	Olivia Broome	Para powerlifting	Women's lightweight	24 July
Bronze	Tom Dean	Swimming	Men's 200 metre individual medley	24 July
Bronze	Matthew Redfern	Swimming	Men's 100 metre freestyle S13	24 July
Bronze	Adam Peaty	Swimming	Men's 100 metre breaststroke	25 July
Bronze	Abigail Martin; Alia Leat; Ruby Stacey; Shantae-Eve Amankwaah; Shanna-Kae Grant	Gymnastics	Women's artistic team all-around	25 July
Bronze	Luke Greenbank	Swimming	Men's 200 metre backstroke	26 July
Bronze	Maddie Down	Athletics	Women's T37/38 100 metres	27 July
Bronze	Iona Winnifrith	Swimming	Women's 100 metre breaststroke SB8	27 July
Bronze	Adam Peaty	Swimming	Men's 50 metre breaststroke	27 July
Bronze	Kimani Jack	Athletics	Men's high jump	27 July
Bronze	Chris Murray	Weightlifting	Men's 79kg	27 July
Bronze	Shantae-Eve Amankwaah	Gymnastics	Women's floor	28 July
Bronze	Amalie Smith	Swimming	Women's 200 metre individual medley	28 July
Bronze	Lauren Cox	Swimming	Women's 50 metre backstroke	28 July
Bronze	Imogen Clark	Swimming	Women's 50 metre breaststroke	28 July
Bronze	Bruce Dee	Swimming	Men's 50 metre freestyle S7	29 July
Bronze	Kevin Santos	Athletics	Men's 100 metre T47	29 July
Bronze	Elizabeth Jordan; Sylvia Misztal	Cycling	Women's tandem sprint B	30 July
Bronze	Scott Lincoln	Athletics	Men's shot put	30 July
Bronze	Andrew Griffiths	Weightlifting	Men's +110 kg	30 July
Bronze	Lauren Mackie	Boxing	Women's 54kg	31 July
Bronze	Charlie Ayre	Judo	Men's -60kg	31 July
Bronze	Tatum Keen	Judo	Women's 52kg	31 July
Bronze	Michael Fryer	Judo	Men's -66kg	31 July
Bronze	Lele Nairne	Judo	Women's -57kg	31 July
Bronze	Harry Ledingham-Horn	Cycling	Men's keirin	31 July
Bronze	Henry Hobbs	Cycling	Men's elimination race	31 July
Bronze	Lucy Kings-Wheatley	Boxing	Women's 60kg	31 July
Bronze	Mary Kate Smith	Boxing	Women's 75kg	31 July
Bronze	Lawrence Okoye	Athletics	Men's Discus throw	1 August
Bronze	Sophie Unwin; Anna Whitworth-Hay	Cycling	Women's tandem 1 km time trial B	1 August
Bronze	Jemima Yeats-Brown	Judo	Women's -70 kg	1 August
Bronze	Jamal Petgrave	Judo	Men's -80 kg	1 August
Bronze	Ethan Vernon	Cycling	Men's scratch race	1 August
Bronze	Owen Heard	Athletics	Men's pole vault	1 August
Bronze	Joe Peplow; Kieran Rollings	Bowls	Men's pairs B6-B8	2 August

Medals by sport
Sport	1st place, gold medalist(s)	2nd place, silver medalist(s)	3rd place, bronze medalist(s)	Total
Athletics	6	9	6	21
Swimming	4	12	10	26
Judo	4	2	6	12
Boxing	4	3	3	10
Cycling	3	7	5	15
Bowls	3	2	1	6
3x3 basketball	2	1	0	3
Gymnastics	1	4	2	7
Weightlifting	1	4	2	7
Para powerlifting	1	1	1	3
Total	29	45	36	110

Medals by day
Day	1st place, gold medalist(s)	2nd place, silver medalist(s)	3rd place, bronze medalist(s)	Total
July 24	1	4	3	8
July 25	2	3	2	7
July 26	1	2	1	4
July 27	4	4	5	13
July 28	2	5	4	11
July 29	2	8	2	12
July 30	3	4	3	10
July 31	2	4	9	15
August 1	9	7	6	22
August 2	3	4	1	8
Total	29	45	36	110

== Competitors ==
The following is the list of number of competitors who participated at the Games per sport/discipline.

Sport	Men	Women	Total
Athletics	41	43	84
3x3 basketball	8	8	16
Bowls	6	8	14
Boxing	7	7	14
Cycling	11	15	26
Gymnastics	5	5	10
Judo	7	7	14
Netball	—N/a	12	12
Para powerlifting	3	4	7
Swimming	18	24	42
Weightlifting	7	8	15
Total	123	141	264

== Athletics ==
Team England announced its para athletics squad of 21 on 24 April 2026.The full squad of 63 able-bodied athletes was announced on 29 June 2026, taking the total England athletics squad to 84.

On 15 July 2026 Hammer thrower Anna Purchase withdrew from the squad with injury.

Prior to the Games, Katerina Johnson-Thompson also withdrew due to injury, while Dina Asher-Smith, Daryll Neita, Amber Anning, Matt Hudson-Smith, Jona Efoloko and Elliot Giles all withdrew from the squad for personal reasons. Tara Simpson-Sullivan (for Purchase, hammer), Niamh Emerson (for Johnson-Thompson, heptathlon), Renee Regis (For Asher-Smith, relay), Mabel Akande (for Neita, 100 metres and relay), Ebuka Nwokeji (for Efoloko, relay), and Tom Keen (for Giles, mile run) were called up as direct replacements. Laviai Nielsen replaced Anning in the individual 400 metres event, having originally been relay only, while Louise Evans joined the relay squad to replace Nielsen. Steeplechaser Mark Pearce was also called up as allowed by England's quota following the withdrawal of Hudson-Smith.

Key

Ranks given for track events are within the athlete's heat only.

- Q = Qualified for the next round
- q = Qualified for the next round as a fastest loser or, in field events, by position without achieving the qualifying target

Men
Track events

Athlete	Event	Heat		Semifinal		Final	
Athlete	Event	Result	Rank	Result	Rank	Result	Rank
Elliot Jones	100 metres	10.07	3 Q	10.24	7	Did not advance	
Zharnel Hughes	200 metres	20.45	1Q	20.67	6	Did not advance	
Ben Pattison	800 metres	1:46.96	2 Q	1:45.42	4 Q	1:46.25	4
Max Burgin	800 metres	1:46.61	1 Q	1:45.61	5	Did not advance	
Alex Botterill	800 metres	1:45.92	2 Q	1:45.39	3 Q	1:46.26	5
Tom Keen	Mile	—		3:59.34	4Q	3:57.60	11
Archie Davis	Mile	—		3:57.98	8	did not advance	
Scott Beattie	10,000 metres	—				27:54.50	5
Tade Ojora	110 metres hurdles	13.48	3 Q	—		13:82	5
Sam Bennett	110 metres hurdles	13.20	1 Q	—		13.30	2nd place, silver medalist(s)
Jake Minshull	400 metres hurdles	48.88	2 Q	—		48.99	2nd place, silver medalist(s)
Josh Faulds	400 metres hurdles	DSQ		did not advance			
Seamus Derbyshire	400 metres hurdles	48.74	1 Q	—		49.45	5
Kristian Imroth	3000 metres s'chase	—				8:38.12	7
Mark Pearce	3000 metres s'chase					8:42.39	8
Nethaneel Mitchell-Blake; Elliot Jones; Romell Glave; Ebuka Nwokeji	4 x 100 metres relay	—		38.90	3Q	38.71	5

Field events

Athlete	Event	Qualification		Final	
Athlete	Event	Distance	Rank	Distance	Rank
Kimani Jack	High jump	—		2.20	3rd place, bronze medalist(s)
Owen Heard	Pole vault	—		5.70	3rd place, bronze medalist(s)
Jake Norris	Hammer throw	—		71.66	4
Scott Lincoln	Shot put	20.09	3 Q	20.99	3rd place, bronze medalist(s)
Ben East	Javelin throw	80.38	4 Q	81.12 PB	7
Lawrence Okoye	Discus throw	—		64.45	3rd place, bronze medalist(s)

Combined events – Decathlon

Athlete	Event	100 m	LJ	SP	HJ	400 m	110H	DT	PV	JT	1500 m	Final	Rank
Sammy Ball	Result	10.56	7.49	13.73	1.97	48.86	14.61	42.43	4.60	44.00	4:32.29	7893	4
Sammy Ball	Points	961	932	712	776	828	897	714	790	513	730	7893	4
Lewis Church	Result	11.14	7.10	14.56	1.97	51.74	14.43	43.77	4.70	56.21	4:30.58	7846	5
Lewis Church	Points	830	838	763	776	736	920	742	819	681	741	7846	5

Women
Track events

Athlete	Event	Heat		Semifinal		Final	
Athlete	Event	Result	Rank	Result	Rank	Result	Rank
Amy Hunt	100 metres	bye		11.02	1Q	10.98	2nd place, silver medalist(s)
Imani-Lara Lansiquot	100 metres	11.04	1Q	11.13	1Q	11.02	4
Mabel Akande	100 metres	11.32	1Q	11.30	6	Did not advance	
Success Eduan	200 metres	bye		22.65	3 Q	23.04	7
Yemi Mary John	400 metres	bye		51.67	1 Q	51.60	6
Laviai Nielsen	400 metres	52.72	2Q	52.17	5	Did not advance	
Georgia Hunter Bell	800 metres	2:02.61	1Q	1:59.88	1Q	1:59.51	1st place, gold medalist(s)
Revée Walcott-Nolan	Mile	—		4:44.93	9	Did not advance	
Katie Snowden	Mile	—		4:33.46	8	Did not advance	
Hannah Nuttall	5000 metres	—				14:51.34	5
Innes FitzGerald	5000 metres	—				15:02.80	11
Izzy Fry	10,000 metres	—				32:50.81	11
Poppy Tank	10,000 metres	—				32:50.83	12
Emma Nwofor	100 metres hurdles	—		13.07	6	Did not advance	
Emily Newnham	400 metres hurdles	—		56.08	2Q	54.04	2nd place, silver medalist(s)
Lina Nielsen	400 metres hurdles	—		55.66	2Q	54.69 SB	4
Elise Thorner	3000 metres s'chase	—				9:05.45	2nd place, silver medalist(s)
Aleeya Sibbons; Mabel Akande; Renee Regis; Louise Evans	4 x 100 metres relay	—		44.11	2Q	43.45	5

Field events

Athlete	Event	Qualification		Final	
Athlete	Event	Distance	Rank	Distance	Rank
Jazmin Sawyers	Long jump	6.80	1Q	6.93	1st place, gold medalist(s)
Lucy Hadaway	Long jump	6.77	2Q	6.62	6
Molly Palmer	Long jump	6.64	3 Q	6.55	7
Georgina Forde-Wells	Triple jump	—		13.70	5
Morgan Lake	High jump	—		NM	-
Gemma Tutton	Pole vault	—		4.10	5
Charlotte Payne	Hammer throw	66.72	4 Q	67.34	4
Tara Simpson-Sullivan	Hammer throw	60.43	12 Q	62.94	9

Combined events – Heptathlon

Athlete	Event	100H	HJ	SP	200 m	LJ	JT	800 m	Final	Rank
Jade O'Dowda	Result	13:32	1.79	13.28	24.93	6.26	43.85	2:12.73	6278	2nd place, silver medalist(s)
Jade O'Dowda	Points	1077	966	746	893	930	741	925	6278	2nd place, silver medalist(s)
Ellen Barber	Result	13.74	1.67	13.17	24.71	6.20	42.77	2:12.29	6050	4
Ellen Barber	Points	1015	818	739	914	912	721	931	6050	4
Niamh Emerson	Result	14.03	1.79	12.94	24.95	5.96	39.31	2:11.37	6002	6
Niamh Emerson	Points	974	966	723	891	837	666	945	6002	6

Mixed

Athlete	Event	Semifinal		Final	
Athlete	Event	Result	Rank	Result	Rank
Laviai Nielsen*; Poppy Malik*; Yemi Mary John; Toby Harries; Ben Jefferies; Lina Nielsen	Mixed 4 x 400 metres relay	3:15.11	1Q	3:11.58	2nd place, silver medalist(s)

Para athletics

Women

Track events

Athlete	Event	Semifinal		Final	
Athlete	Event	Result	Rank	Result	Rank
Maddie Down	100 metres (T38)	13.10	3Q	12.86	3rd place, bronze medalist(s)
Sophie Hahn	100 metres (T38)	12.75	1Q	12.79	1st place, gold medalist(s)
Sophie Hahn	200 metres (T38)	—		27.53	2nd place, silver medalist(s)
Ali Smith	200 metres (T38)	—		29.21	5
Rosie Porter	200 metres (T38)	—		29.30	6
Ellis Kottas	1500 metres (T54)	—			4

Field Events

Athlete	Event	Final	
Athlete	Event	Result	Rank
Elizabeth Dodds	Long jump (T38)	4.07	8
Maddie Down	Long jump (T38)	4.65	6
Ozi Nlewedum	Shot put F57	5.31	9
Didi Okoh	Discus throw (F44)	774 pts	6
Bebe Jackson	Discus throw (F44)	448 pts	8

Men

Track events

Athlete	Event	Semifinal		Final	
Athlete	Event	Result	Rank	Result	Rank
Zac Shaw	100 metres (T12)	10.91	1Q	10.89	1st place, gold medalist(s)
Thomas Young	100 metres (T38)	—		11.11	1st place, gold medalist(s)
Kevin Santos	100 metres (T47)	—		10.85	3rd place, bronze medalist(s)
Kieran O'Hara	1500 metres (T20)	—		4:10.03	7
Daniel Wolff	1500 metres (T20)	—		4:09.27	5
Danny Sidbury	1500 metres (T54)	—		3:18.31	2nd place, silver medalist(s)
Nathan Maguire	1500 metres (T54)	—		3:17.65	1st place, gold medalist(s)

Field events

Athlete	Event	Final	
Athlete	Event	Result	Rank
Samuel Jose	Long jump (T20)	6.04	4
Dan Greaves	Discus throw (F44)	903 pts	4
Taz Nicholls	Shot put (F57)	10.54 SB	5

== 3x3 basketball ==
England's men's and women's wheelchair basketball teams confirmed their qualification by winning the European zone IWBF Commonwealth Games qualification tournaments on April 4 2026.

The 2026 Commonwealth Games 3x3 Home Nations Qualifier for the standing version was held at the National Basketball Performance Centre in Manchester on 22 and 23 May 2026. Teams from England, Wales, Northern Ireland, and the Isle of Man competed in both men's and women's round-robin tournaments, with the winner of each final securing a spot at the Games. England won both tournaments, gaining the last qualification spot in both the men's and women's standing 3x3 competitions.

The two running basketball squads were announced on 7 July 2026, with the two wheelchair basketball squads announced the following day.

Summary

Team	Event	Group stage						Quarterfinal	Semifinal	Final / BM / CM	
Team	Event	Opposition Score	Opposition Score	Opposition Score	Opposition Score	Opposition Score	Rank	Opposition Score	Opposition Score	Opposition Score	Rank
England; Jamell Anderson; Ashley Hamilton; Dwayne Lautier-Ogunleye; Evan Walshe	Men's	Jamaica; W 22-16	Fiji; W 21-16	Kenya; W 21-9	Malaysia; W 21-19	Singapore; W 21-13	1Q	Bye	New Zealand; W 21-16	Australia; W 19-17	1st place, gold medalist(s)
England; Shanice Beckford-Norton; Georgia Gayle; Cheridene Green; Katie Januszewska	Women's	Singapore; W 21–7	Scotland; W 14–9	New Zealand; L 12–21	Papua New Guinea; W 21-4	Tonga; W 21-4	2Q	Jamaica; L 21-20	Did not advance		5
England; James Hazell; Tom Harvey; Oscar Knight; Peter Cusack	Men's wheelchair	Australia; W 16-13	Canada; W 20-10	Kenya; W 21-0	—		1Q	Bye	Canada; W 18-13	Australia; L 13-19	2nd place, silver medalist(s)
England; Charlotte Moore; Joy Hatzelden; Jade Atkin; Lucy Robinson	Women's wheelchair	Australia; W 15-6	Canada; W 15-12	South Africa; W 21-2	—		1Q	Bye	Canada; W 18-10	Scotland; W 18-10	1st place, gold medalist(s)

=== Men's tournament ===
Group play

Pos	Team	Pld	W	L	PF	PA	PD	Qualification
1	England	5	5	0	105	70	+35	Direct to semi-finals
2	Malaysia	5	4	1	103	82	+21	Quarter-finals
3	Singapore	5	2	3	88	86	+2	Quarter-finals
4	Kenya	5	2	3	82	82	0	
5	Fiji	5	1	4	66	97	−31	
6	Jamaica	5	1	4	77	104	−27	

Source: Glasgow 2026
Rules for classification: 1) Wins; 2) Head-to-head record; 3) Points scored.

25 July 2026
12:30

Report

England	22–16	Jamaica
Pts: Walshe 9		Pts: McDonald 7

SEC, Glasgow

25 July 2026
15:45

Report

England	21–13	Fiji
Pts: Lautier-Ogunleye 13		Pts: Waqabaca 5

SEC, Glasgow

25 July 2026
19:50

Report

England	21–9	Kenya
Pts: Lautier-Ogunleye 8		Pts: Gichohi 5

SEC, Glasgow

27 July 2026
13:35

Report

England	21–19	Malaysia
Pts: Lautier-Ogunleye 8		Pts: Chong, Ting 6

SEC, Glasgow

27 July 2026
17:25

Report

Singapore	13–21	England
Pts: Nur 5		Pts: Walshe 8

SEC, Glasgow

Knockout stage

Play-ins
28 July
New Zealand	21
Singapore	15
28 July
Malaysia	16
Scotland	21

Semi-finals
29 July
England	21
New Zealand	16
29 July
Australia	21
Scotland	14

Gold medal match
29 July
England	19
Australia	17
Bronze medal match
29 July
New Zealand	16
Scotland	18

Semi-final

29 July 2026
12:00

Report

England	21–16	New Zealand
Pts: Hamilton 8		Pts: Martin 8

SEC, Glasgow

Final

29 July 2026
19:30

Report

England	19–17	Australia
Pts: Lautier-Ogunleye 7		Pts: Antonio 12

SEC, Glasgow

=== Women's tournament ===
Group play

Pos	Team	Pld	W	L	PF	PA	PD	Qualification
1	New Zealand	5	5	0	105	54	+51	Direct to semi-finals
2	England	5	4	1	89	45	+44	Quarter-finals
3	Tonga	5	3	2	50	72	−22	Quarter-finals
4	Scotland (H)	5	2	3	73	67	+6	
5	Singapore	5	1	4	69	85	−16	
6	Papua New Guinea	5	0	5	33	96	−63	

Source: Glasgow 2026
Rules for classification: 1) Wins; 2) Head-to-head record; 3) Points scored.
(H) Hosts

25 July 2026
10:00

Report

Singapore	7–22	England
Pts: Lim 5		Pts: Beckford-Norton 9

SEC, Glasgow

25 July 2026
17:00

Report

England	14–9	Scotland
Pts: Green 7		Pts: Robb, Doherty 3

SEC, Glasgow

25 July 2026
21:15

Report

New Zealand	21–12	England
Pts: Pupuke-Robati 11		Pts: Gayle 5

SEC, Glasgow

27 July 2026
14:50

Report

England	21–4	Papua New Guinea
Pts: Gayle 9		Pts: Asiba 3

SEC, Glasgow

27 July 2026
18:40

Report

England	21–4	Tonga
Pts: Januszewska 8		Pts: M Finau 3

SEC, Glasgow

Knockout stage

Play-ins
28 July
Uganda	21
Tonga	12
28 July
England	20
Jamaica	21

Semi-finals
29 July
New Zealand	9
Uganda	21
29 July
Australia	21
Jamaica	8

Gold medal match
29 July
Uganda	11
Australia	21
Bronze medal match
29 July
New Zealand	18
Jamaica	13

Quarter-final

28 July 2026
20:00

Report

England	20–21	Jamaica
Pts: Beckford-Norton 9		Pts: Reynolds 7

SEC, Glasgow

=== Men's wheelchair tournament ===
Group play

Pos	Team	Pld	W	L	PF	PA	PD	Qualification
1	England	3	3	0	57	23	+34	Semi-finals
2	Australia	3	2	1	54	33	+21	Play-ins
3	Canada	3	1	2	38	43	−5	Play-ins
4	Kenya	3	0	3	8	58	−50	

Source: Glasgow 2026
Rules for classification: 1) Wins; 2) Head-to-head record; 3) Points scored.

24 July 2026
16:35

Report

England	16–13	Australia
Pts: Cusack 7		Pts: O'Neill-Thorne, Pople 4

SEC Centre, Glasgow

26 July 2026
14:00

Report

England	20–10	Canada
Pts: Knight 7		Pts: Ostepchuk, De'Aeth 3

SEC Centre, Glasgow

27 July 2026
14:25

Report

Kenya	0–21	England
		Pts: Harvey, Knight 6

SEC Centre, Glasgow

Knockout stage

Play-ins
28 July
Australia	21
Wales	6
28 July
South Africa	5
Canada	15

Semi-finals
29 July
Scotland	12
Australia	19
29 July
England	18
Canada	13

Gold medal match
29 July
Australia	19
England	13
Bronze medal match
29 July
Scotland	9
Canada	19

Semi-final

29 July 2026
12:30

Report

Scotland	12–19	Australia
Pts: Erskine 9		Pts: O'Neill-Thorne 8

SEC Centre, Glasgow

29 July 2026
13:00

Report

England	18–13	Canada
Pts: Knight 9		Pts: De'Eath 10

SEC Centre, Glasgow

Final

29 July 2026
18:30

Report

Australia	19–13	England
Pts: Leard 10		Pts: Knight 6

SEC Centre, Glasgow

=== Women's wheelchair tournament ===
Group play

Pos	Team	Pld	W	L	PF	PA	PD	Qualification
1	England	3	3	0	51	20	+31	Semi-finals
2	Australia	3	2	1	38	30	+8	Quarter-finals
3	Canada	3	1	2	41	30	+11	Quarter-finals
4	South Africa	3	0	3	10	60	−50	

Source: Glasgow 2026
Rules for classification: 1) Wins; 2) Head-to-head record; 3) Points scored.

24 July 2026
12:05

Report

England	15–6	Australia
Pts: Haizelden 7		Pts: Munro-Cook 4

SEC Centre, Glasgow

26 July 2026
12:45

Report

England	15–12	Canada
Pts: Robinson, Atkin 5		Pts: Dendeneau 11

SEC Centre, Glasgow

27 July 2026
12:20

Report

South Africa	2–21	England
Pts: Moganedi, Hagu 1		Pts: Robinson 8

SEC Centre, Glasgow

Knockout stage

Play-ins
28 July
Australia	19
Nigeria	2
28 July
Wales	3
Canada	21

Semi-finals
29 July
Scotland	15
Australia	12
29 July
England	18
Canada	10

Gold medal match
29 July
Scotland	10
England	18
Bronze medal match
29 July
Australia	19
Canada	17

Semi-final

29 July 2026
15:00

Report

Scotland	15–12	Australia
Pts: Love 6		Pts: Munro-Cook 6

SEC Centre, Glasgow

29 July 2026
14:30

Report

England	18–10	Canada
Pts: Atkin 9		Pts: Tessier 5

SEC Centre, Glasgow

Final

29 July 2026
19:00

Report

Scotland	10–18	England
Pts: Smith 6		Pts: Atkin 7

SEC Centre, Glasgow

== Boxing ==
England were allocated 12 boxing quotas across the fourteen weight divisions, with a maximum of one boxer per weight allowed. A further two quotas were reallocated to Boxing England, to allow a final selection of fourteen boxers, seven of each sex, on 1 July 2026.

Men

Athlete	Event	Round of 32	Round of 16	Quarterfinals	Semifinals	Final	
Athlete	Event	Opposition Result	Opposition Result	Opposition Result	Opposition Result	Opposition Result	Rank
Ellis Trowbridge	55 kg	Nomleas (VAN); W RSC	Prasanna (SRI); W 4-0	Mohammed (GHA); L 1-4	Did not advance		5
Will Hewitt	60 kg	Bye	Siwach (IND); L 1-4	Did not advance			9
Patris Mughalzai	65 kg	Omar (GHA); W 5-0	Hale (NIR); W 5-0	Batte (UGA); W 3-2	Bonzo (MAW); W 4-1	Cassar (AUS); W 5-0	1st place, gold medalist(s)
Paddy Hewitt	70 kg	Bye	Holley-Sotomi (WAL); L 1-4	Did not advance			9
Dimeji Shittu	80 kg	Bye	Ojok (UGA); W 5-0	Okaka (KEN); W 5-0	Trainor (AUS); W 5-0	Ankush (IND); L 4-1	2nd place, silver medalist(s)
Isaac Okoh	90 kg	—N/a	Bye	Lawson (AUS); W 5-0	McNulty (SCO); W 5-0	Williams (WAL); W 5-0	1st place, gold medalist(s)
Damar Thomas	+90 kg	—N/a		Abdul (UGA); W DSQ	McCartan (NIR); W w/o	Narender (IND); W 5-0	1st place, gold medalist(s)

Women

Athlete	Event	Round of 32	Round of 16	Quarterfinals	Semifinals	Final	
Athlete	Event	Opposition Result	Opposition Result	Opposition Result	Opposition Result	Opposition Result	Rank
Ruby White	51 kg	—N/a	Mathiba (RSA); W 5-0	Katushabe (UGA); W 5-0	Araes (NAM); W RSC	Sakshi (IND); L 5-0	2nd place, silver medalist(s)
Lauren Mackie	54 kg	Faki (KEN); W 5-0	Suraci (AUS); W 3-2	H Jones (WAL); W 5-0	Delgado (CAN); L 1-4	Did not advance	3rd place, bronze medalist(s)
Elise Glynn	57 kg	—N/a	Bye	Jaismine (IND); L 1-4	Did not advance		5
Lucy Kings-Wheatley	60 kg	—N/a	Nokenoke (PNG); W 5-0	Betist (SLE); W 3-2	Priya (IND); L 0-5	Did not advance	3rd place, bronze medalist(s)
Sacha Hickey	65 kg	—N/a		Parveen (IND); W 3-2	Bryson (AUS); W 5-0	Rock (NIR); W 5-0	1st place, gold medalist(s)
Chantelle Reid	70 kg	—N/a		Hill (NIR); W 5-0	Pergoliti (AUS); W 5-0	Choudhary (IND); L 5-0	2nd place, silver medalist(s)
Mary Kate Smith	75 kg	—N/a		Mbata (NGR); W 3-2	Greentree (AUS); L 2-3	Did not advance	3rd place, bronze medalist(s)

== Cycling ==
Commonwealth Games England announced their cycling and para cycling squad on 2 June 2026. Matthew Richardson withdrew from the squad on 29 July 2026 due to injury and was replaced by Harry Radford.

=== Track ===
Sprint

Athlete	Event	Qualification		Round 1	Quarterfinals	Semifinals	Final	
Athlete	Event	Time	Rank	Opposition Time	Opposition Time	Opposition Time	Opposition Time	Rank
Joe Truman	Men's sprint	9.978	8 Q	Awang (MAS); L +0.073	did not advance			
Hamish Turnbull	Men's sprint	9.639	4 Q	Rorke (CAN); L +0.048	did not advance			
Harry Ledingham-Horn	Men's sprint	9.646	6 Q	Ioan Hepburn (WAL); W	Phillip (TTO); W 2-1	Paul (TTO); L 1-2	for bronze Ryan (AUS); L 0-2	4
Harry Radford; Joe Truman; Hamish Turnbull; Harry Ledingham-Horn	Men's team sprint	42.799	2 QG				Australia; L 43.032 +0.577	2nd place, silver medalist(s)
Sophie Capewell	Women's sprint	10.458	2 Q	Mohd Farid (MAS); W	Marchant (ENG); W 2-0	Mohd Asri (MAS); W 2-1	for gold Finucance (WAL); L 0-2	2nd place, silver medalist(s)
Katy Marchant	Women's sprint	10.671	7 Q	McGill (AUS); W	Capewell (ENG); L 0-2	did not advance		
Rhianna Parris-Smith	Women's sprint	10.514	3 Q	King (NZL); W	Mohd Asri (MAS) L 1-2	did not advance		
Sophie Capewell; Katy Marchant; Rhianna Parris-Smith; Georgette Rand	Women's team sprint	47.152	2 QG				Wales; L 46.901 +0.141	2nd place, silver medalist(s)
Sophie Unwin; Anna Whitworth-Hay - pilot	Women's tandem sprint B	10.890	2 Q			Foy / Hodges (p) (AUS); L 0-2	for bronze Jordan/ Misztal (ENG); L 0-2	4
Lizzi Jordan; Sylvia Misztal - pilot	Women's tandem sprint B	10.870	1 Q			Gallagher / Mengler-Mohr (AUS); L 0-2	for bronze Unwin/ Whitworth-Haye (ENG); W 0-2	3rd place, bronze medalist(s)

Keirin

Athlete	Event	1st Round	Repechage	Semifinals	Final
Athlete	Event	Rank	Rank	Rank	Rank
Hamish Turnbull	Men's keirin	4 R	2	did not advance	
Harry Ledingham-Horn	Men's keirin	2 Q	bye	3 Q	3rd place, bronze medalist(s)
Harry Radford	Men's keirin	1 Q	bye	5 QB	9
Katy Marchant	Women's keirin	4 R	1 Q	2 Q	5
Georgette Rand	Women's keirin	4 R	2 Q	6 QB	9
Sophie Capewell	Women's keirin	3 R	1 Q	4 QB	11

Time trial

Athlete	Event	Time	Rank
Joe Truman	Men's time trial	59.525	2nd place, silver medalist(s)
Hamish Turnbull	Men's time trial	1:01.132	8
Harry Ledingham-Horn	Men's time trial	1:00.039	4
Sophie Capewell	Women's time trial	1:06.107	4
Georgette Rand	Women's time trial	1:07.021	10
Sophie Unwin; Sylvia Misztal - pilot	Women's tandem time trial B	1:06.962	3rd place, bronze medalist(s)
Lizzi Jordan; Anna Whitworth-Hay - pilot	Women's tandem time trial B	1:07.977	4
Matthew Robertson	Men's time trial C1-3	1:10.282 FT; 1:14.373 AT	6
Kadeena Cox	Women's time trial C4-5	1:09.943 FT; 1:10:864 AT	2nd place, silver medalist(s)
Morgan Newberry	Women's time trial C4-5	1:18:332	5

Pursuit

Athlete	Event	Qualification		Final	
Athlete	Event	Time	Rank	Opponent Results	Rank
Josh Charlton	Men's individual pursuit	4:08.402	8	did not advance	
Charlie Tanfield	Men's individual pursuit	4:06.254	4	did not advance	
Ethan Vernon	Men's individual pursuit	4:06.367	5	did not advance	
Matthew Robertson	Men's individual pursuit C1-3	3:25.655 FT; 3:37.624 AT	2 QG	3:22.597 FT; 3:34.388 AT	1st place, gold medalist(s)
Ethan Vernon; Charlie Tanfield; Josh Charlton*; Will Tidball; Henry Hobbs	Men's team pursuit	3:50.892	2 QG	Australia; W 3:47.092 GR -1.131	1st place, gold medalist(s)
Josie Knight	Women's individual pursuit	4:25.719 GR	1 QG	Morris (WAL); L 4:30.413 +6.141	2nd place, silver medalist(s)
Grace Lister	Women's individual pursuit	4:37.937	8	did not advance	
Morgan Newberry	Women's individual pursuit C4-5	5:06.470	2 QG	Neyland (AUS); L 5:05.764 +19.150	2nd place, silver medalist(s)
Kadeena Cox	Women's individual pursuit C4-5	6:37.119 FT; 6:42.472 AT	5	did not advance	
Josie Knight; Maddie Leech; Sophie Lewis; Grace Lister; Abi Miller	Women's team pursuit	4:16.534	4 QB	Wales; L 4:20.653 +7.680	4

Points race

Athlete	Event	Final	
Athlete	Event	Points	Rank
Charlie Tanfield	Men's points race	29	12
Will Tidball	Men's points race	DNF	—
Henry Hobbs	Men's points race	DNF	—
Grace Lister	Women's points race	0	20
Josie Knight	Women's points race	42	5
Maddie Leech	Women's points race	23	10

Scratch race

Athlete	Event	Qualification	Final
Ethan Vernon	Men's scratch race	3 Q	3rd place, bronze medalist(s)
'Henry Hobbs	Men's scratch race	9 Q	1st place, gold medalist(s)
Will Tidball	Men's scratch race	10 Q	DNF
Abigail Miller	Women's scratch race		4
Sophie Lewis	Women's scratch race		14
Maddie Leech	Women's scratch race		7

Elimination race

Athlete	Event	Rank
Ethan Vernon	Men's elimination	12
Henry Hobbs	Men's elimination	3rd place, bronze medalist(s)
Will Tidball	Men's elimination	5
Abigail Miller	Women's elimination	13
Sophie Lewis	Women's elimination	19
Maddie Leech	Women's elimination	4

== Artistic gymnastics ==
England announced a full squad of ten gymnasts. On 13 July Max Whitlock withdrew due to a hand injury he sustained in training. He was replaced by reserve Gabriel Langton.

Men
Team Final & Individual Qualification

Athlete	Event	Apparatus						Total	Rank
Athlete	Event	FL	PH	SR	VT	PB	HB	Total	Rank
Adam Tobin	Team	~~12.450~~	12.950 Q	13.400 Q	13.950	13.800 Q	13.100	79.650	4 Q
Alex Yolshin-Cash	Team		~~11.550~~			14.100 Q	13.250 Q		
Joshua Nathan	Team	13.100 Q	12.900	~~12.250~~	13.250				
Luke Whitehouse	Team	14.400 Q	12.400	13.150 Q	14.150 Q	12.900	11.700	78.700	6 Q
Gabriel Langton	Team	12.950		12.800	~~12.350~~	~~12.600~~	~~3.350~~		
Total	Team	40.450	38.250	39.350	41.350	40.800	38.050	238.250	2nd place, silver medalist(s)

Individual all-around final

Athlete	Event	Apparatus						Total	Rank
Athlete	Event	FL	PH	SR	VT	PB	HB	Total	Rank
Adam Tobin	All-around	12.550	12.700	13.050	14.150	13.300	13.050	78.800	5
Luke Whitehouse	All-around	12.950	11.550	12.650	14.000	13.250	12.900	77.300	7

Apparatus finals

Athlete	Event	Difficulty	Execution	Total	Rank
Joshua Nathan	Floor exercise	4.800	7.966	12.766	7
Luke Whitehouse	Floor exercise	6.100	8.466	14.566	1st place, gold medalist(s)
Luke Whitehouse	Rings	4.900	8.200	13.100	5
Adam Tobin	Rings	4.900	8.166	13.066	6
Adam Tobin	Pommel horse	5.000	7.066	12.066	8
Adam Tobin	Parallel bars	5.200	7.833	13.033	6
Alex Yolshin-Cash	Parallel bars	5.300	7.400	12.700	8
Alex Yolshin-Cash	Horizontal bar	4.700	8.533	13.233	4

Athlete	Event	Vault 1			Vault 2			Total	Rank
Athlete	Event	Difficulty	Execution	Total	Difficulty	Execution	Total	Total	Rank
Luke Whitehouse	Vault	5.200	8.950	14.150	4.800	9.050	13.850	14.000	2nd place, silver medalist(s)

Women
Team Final & Individual Qualification

Athlete	Event	Apparatus				Total	Rank
Athlete	Event	VT	UB	BB	FL	Total	Rank
Abigail Martin	Team	13.550 Q	12.800	11.800	13.250 Q	51.400	7 Q
Alia Leat	Team	13.400	12.450	12.800 Q	~~12.150~~	50.800	9 NR
Ruby Stacey	Team	13.250 Q	~~11.700~~	~~11.550~~			
Shantae-Eve Amankwaah	Team	~~12.700~~	13.500 Q	12.150	13.050 Q	51.400	8 Q
Shanna-Kae Grant	Team				12.300		
Total	Team	40.200	38.750	36.750	38.600	154.300	3rd place, bronze medalist(s)

Individual All-around final

Athlete	Event	Apparatus				Total	Rank
Athlete	Event	VT	UB	BB	FL	Total	Rank
Abigail Martin	All-around	13.600	10.950	11.650	12.600	48.800	11
Shantae-Eve Amankwaah	All-around	12.950	13.350	12.200	13.050	51.550	4

Apparatus finals

Athlete	Event	Difficulty	Execution	Total	Rank
Abigail Martin	Floor exercise	5.800	7.533	13.333	2nd place, silver medalist(s)
Shantae-Eve Amankwaah	Floor exercise	5.200	8.100	13.300	3rd place, bronze medalist(s)
Shantae-Eve Amankwaah	Uneven bars	5.700	7.533	13.233	5
Alia Leat	Balance beam	6.000	6.866	12.866	5

Vault

Athlete	Event	Vault 1			Vault 2			Bonus	Total	Rank
Athlete	Event	Difficulty	Execution	Total	Difficulty	Execution	Total	Bonus	Total	Rank
Abigail Martin	Vault	5.000	8.766	13.766	4.800	8.633	13.433	0.2	13.799	2nd place, silver medalist(s)
Ruby Stacey	Vault	4.200	8.500	12.700	3.800	7.500	11.300		12.000	8

== Judo ==
Team England selected a team of 14 judoka on 17 June 2026. The team was highlighted by returning gold medalist Emma Reid, brother and sister Ethan and Lele Nairne, and Acelya Toprak, who transferred allegiance to Azerbaijan before the 2024 Summer Olympics, but has returned to British and English colours since 2025. England selected multiple athletes in four weight classes, so were not represented in some other classes to stay within quota numbers.

Men

Athlete	Event	Round of 32	Round of 16	Quarterfinals	Semifinals	Repechage	Final/BM	
Athlete	Event	Opposition Result	Opposition Result	Opposition Result	Opposition Result	Opposition Result	Opposition Result	Rank
Charlie Ayre	60 kg		bye	Gangaya (MRI); W 101-000	Katz (AUS); L 000-001	bye	for bronze Wali (KEN); W 112-0	3rd place, bronze medalist(s)
Michael Fryer	66 kg	bye	Macdonald (SCO); W 101-001 s3	Balarjishv' (CYP); L 000-011		Majgul (IND); W 002-001	for bronze Agbo (NGR); W 101-000	3rd place, bronze medalist(s)
Ethan Nairne	73 kg	bye	Pacitti (SCO); W 102-001	Moore (WAL); W 001-000	Njie (GAM); W 011-000		for gold Levy (ENG); W 001-000	1st place, gold medalist(s)
Ben Levy	73 kg	bye	Chipokosa (MAW); W 100-000	Johnson (BAH); W 100-000	Green (NIR); W 011-000		for gold Nairne (ENG); L 000-001	2nd place, silver medalist(s)
Jamal Petgrave	90 kg		Morris-McKenzie (GIB); W 100-000	Vojnikovich (AUS); L 001-002		Ngueya (CMR); W 100-000	for bronze Noah Walliss (NZL); W 012-000	3rd place, bronze medalist(s)
Max Gregory	100 kg		bye	Rowley (NZL); W 100-000	Barratt (WAL); W 100-000		for gold Kyle Reyes (CAN); L 000-100	2nd place, silver medalist(s)
Wesley Greenidge	+100 kg		Miller (SCO); L 000-100	did not advance				=12

Women

Athlete	Event	Round of 16	Quarterfinals	Semifinals	Repechage	Final/BM	
Athlete	Event	Opposition Result	Opposition Result	Opposition Result	Opposition Result	Opposition Result	Rank
Tatum Keen	52 kg	bye	Rioux (MRI); W 100-000	Asvesta (CYP); L 000-001	bye	for bronze Hosdon (WAL); W 100-000	3rd place, bronze medalist(s)
Acelya Toprak	57 kg	bye	Delrieu (VAN); W 100-000	Neirne (ENG); W 001-000		for gold Mourya (IND); W 100-000 s3	1st place, gold medalist(s)
Lele Nairne	57 kg	bye	Begue (CMR); W 100-000	Toprak (ENG); L 000-001	bye	for bronze Agyei (GHA); W 1000-000	3rd place, bronze medalist(s)
Jemima Yeats-Brown	70 kg	Njeri (KEN); W 102-000	Pollard (ENG); L 000-101		Takhellambam (IND); W 100-000	for bronze de Villiers (NZL); W 100-000	3rd place, bronze medalist(s)
Kelly Paterson-Pollard	70 kg	bye	Yeats-Brown (ENG); W 101-000	Thibault (CAN); W 100-000		for gold Coughlan (AUS); W 100-000 s3	1st place, gold medalist(s)
Emma Reid	78 kg	bye	Narang (IND); W 100-000	Michaelidou (CYP); W 101-000		for gold Swan (AUS); W 101-000	1st place, gold medalist(s)
Shelly Ludford	78 kg	bye	Godbout (CAN); L 000-001		Cherotich (KEN); W 110-000	for bronze Michaelidou (CYP); L 000-001	=5

== Lawn bowls ==
Team England announced a 14-strong bowls and para-bowls squad on 26 January 2026.

Men

Athlete	Event	Group Stage						Semifinal	Final / BM	
Athlete	Event	Opposition Score	Opposition Score	Opposition Score	Opposition Score	Opposition Score	Rank	Opposition Score	Opposition Score	Rank
Sam Tolchard	Singles	R Owen (WAL); W 2-0	M Qureshi (PAK); W 2-0	R Simpson (JAM); W 2-0	J Banks (SCO); W 2-0	R Prasad (FIJ); L 1-1*	1Q	G Kelly (NIR); W 2-0	Dzulkeple (MAS); W 2-0	1st place, gold medalist(s)
Nick Brett; Jamie Walker	Pairs	Falkland Islands; W 2-0	Botswana; W 2-0	Cook Islands; W 1-1*	Namibia; W 2-0	India; W 1-1*	1Q	Canada; W 2-0	Northern Ireland; L 1-1*	2nd place, silver medalist(s)

Women

Athlete	Event	Group Stage							Semifinal	Final / BM	
Athlete	Event	Opposition Score	Opposition Score	Opposition Score	Opposition Score	Opposition Score	Opposition Score	Rank	Opposition Score	Opposition Score	Rank
Katherine Rednall	Singles	Andrieux (JEY); W 2-0	McKerihen (CAN); L 1-1*	Rixon (MLT); W 1-1*	Arthur-Almond (FLK); W 2-0	Fife (AUS); W 1.5-0.5	Jim (COK); W 2-0	1Q	Wilson (NFK); W 1-1*	Merrien (GGY); W 2-0	1st place, gold medalist(s)
Sian Honnor; Amy Pharaoh	Pairs	India; W 1-1*	Malta; W 2-0	South Africa; W 1-1*	Tonga; W 1-1*	Namibia; W 2-0	—N/a	1Q	Wales; W 1-1*	Malaysia; W 1.5-0.5	1st place, gold medalist(s)

Para-sport

Athlete	Event	Group Stage						Semifinal	Final / BM	
Athlete	Event	Opposition Score	Opposition Score	Opposition Score	Opposition Score	Opposition Score	Rank	Opposition Score	Opposition Score	Rank
Joe Peplow; Kieran Rollings	Men's pairs B6–8	Scotland; W 1-1*	South Africa; L 2-0	Singapore; W 2-0	Australia; L 1-1*	New Zealand; W 1-1*	2Q	New Zealand; L 2-0	Scotland; W 1-1*	3rd place, bronze medalist(s)
Michelle White; Helen Wood	Women's pairs B6–8	Scotland; L 1-1*	Malaysia; L 2-0	Canada; W 1.5-0.5	Australia; L 2-0	New Zealand; W 1-1*	5	Did not advance		5
Ron Homer*; Sally-Ann Lewis-Wall*	Mixed pairs B2-3	Scotland; L 2-0	Wales; L 2-0	South Africa; W 2-0	Australia; L 1-1*	New Zealand; W 2-0	4Q	Wales; W 2-0	Scotland; L 1-1*	2nd place, silver medalist(s)

* assisted by Sue Davies and Elizabeth Shipley (directors)

== Netball ==
England qualified as one of the top 11 eligible teams in the World Netball Rankings as of 1 September 2025. The squad was named on 25 June 2026. Natalie Metcalf withdrew due to a calf injury on 23 July 2026 and was replaced by Ella Clark.

Summary

Team	Event	Group stage						Semifinal	Final / BM / Cl.	
Team	Event	Opposition Result	Opposition Result	Opposition Result	Opposition Result	Opposition Result	Rank	Opposition Result	Opposition Result	Rank
England	Women's tournament	Northern Ireland; W 83–34	Australia; L 47-66	Malawi; W 77–38	Tonga; W 94-32	South Africa; W 58-54	2 Q	New Zealand; L 61-54	Bronze medal match Australia; L 68-50	4

Squad

England Netball Squad
Attack	Midcourt	Defence
Olivia Tchine (vc)	Amy Carter (vc)	Fran Williams (c)
Eleanor Cardwell	Lois Pearson	Funmi Fadoju
Sasha Glasgow	Jessica Shaw	Jayda Pechova
Ella Clark*	Imogen Allison	Halimat Adio

*Ella Clark was an injury replacement for Natalie Metcalf

Group stage

Pos	Team	Pld	W	D	L	GF	GA	GD	Pts	Qualification
1	Australia	5	5	0	0	378	191	+187	10	Semi-finals
2	England	5	4	0	1	355	224	+131	8	Semi-finals
3	South Africa	5	3	0	2	340	231	+109	6	Classification matches
4	Malawi	5	2	0	3	233	303	−70	4	Classification matches
5	Tonga	5	1	0	4	219	396	−177	2	Classification matches
6	Northern Ireland	5	0	0	5	191	371	−180	0	Classification matches

Source: Glasgow 2026

25 July 2026; 14:00	Report	England	83–34	Northern Ireland	OVO Hydro; Umpires: Justin Barnes, Kristie Simpson; Reserve umpire: Tracy-Ann Griffiths
25 July 2026; 14:00	Report	Scoring by quarter: 24–7, 17–11, 19–8, 23–8			OVO Hydro; Umpires: Justin Barnes, Kristie Simpson; Reserve umpire: Tracy-Ann Griffiths
25 July 2026; 14:00	Report	Eleanor Cardwell 36/38 (95%); Olivia Tchine 25/26 (96%); Sasha Glasgow 12/12 (100%); Lois Pearson 4/5 (80%); Ella Clark 6/8 (75%)		Lisa Bowman 24/28 (86%); Orlaith Rogers 7/9 (78%); Emma Magee 3/4 (75%); Georgie McGrath 0/2 (0%)	OVO Hydro; Umpires: Justin Barnes, Kristie Simpson; Reserve umpire: Tracy-Ann Griffiths

26 July 2026; 11:00	Report	Australia	66–47	England	OVO Hydro; Umpires: Alison Harrison, Kristie Simpson; Reserve umpire: Ken Metekingi
26 July 2026; 11:00	Report	Scoring by quarter: 18–11, 17–13, 21–11, 10–12			OVO Hydro; Umpires: Alison Harrison, Kristie Simpson; Reserve umpire: Ken Metekingi
26 July 2026; 11:00	Report	Sophie Garbin 41/42 (98%); Kiera Austin 15/19 (79%); Sophie Dwyer 6/6 (100%); Cara Koenen 4/5 (80%)		Olivia Tchine 23/25 (92%); Lois Pearson 14/16 (88%); Eleanor Cardwell 10/13 (77%)	OVO Hydro; Umpires: Alison Harrison, Kristie Simpson; Reserve umpire: Ken Metekingi

27 July 2026; 14:00	Report	Malawi	38–73	England	OVO Hydro; Umpires: Ken Metekingi, Tania Fink; Reserve umpire: Georgina Sulley-Beales
27 July 2026; 14:00	Report	Scoring by quarter: 9–18, 14–19, 10–18, 5–18			OVO Hydro; Umpires: Ken Metekingi, Tania Fink; Reserve umpire: Georgina Sulley-Beales
27 July 2026; 14:00	Report	Mwayi Kumwenda 20/23 (87%); Ethel Ng'ambi 7/7 (100%); Florence Jeke 5/6 (83%); Tendai Masamba 5/7 (71%); Stellah Matelezi 1/2 (50%)		Olivia Tchine 24/26 (92%); Eleanor Cardwell 21/21 (100%); Lois Pearson 16/17 (94%); Sasha Glasgow 9/10 (90%); Ella Clark 3/3 (100%)	OVO Hydro; Umpires: Ken Metekingi, Tania Fink; Reserve umpire: Georgina Sulley-Beales

29 July 2026; 16:00	Report	England	94–32	Tonga	OVO Hydro; Umpires: Alison Harrison, Ken Metekingi; Reserve umpire: Tracy-Ann Griffiths
29 July 2026; 16:00	Report	Scoring by quarter: 27–8, 18–6, 24–11, 25–7			OVO Hydro; Umpires: Alison Harrison, Ken Metekingi; Reserve umpire: Tracy-Ann Griffiths
29 July 2026; 16:00	Report	Eleanor Cardwell 54/59 (92%); Sasha Glasgow 18/23 (78%); Ella Clark 12/15 (80%); Olivia Tchine 10/11 (91%)		Uneeq Palavi 27/30 (90%); Lavinia Lavea 4/6 (67%); Marie Payn 1/2 (50%)	OVO Hydro; Umpires: Alison Harrison, Ken Metekingi; Reserve umpire: Tracy-Ann Griffiths

30 July 2026; 21:00	Report	England	58–54	South Africa	OVO Hydro; Umpires: Bronwen Adams, Georgina Sulley-Beales; Reserve umpire: Kristie Simpson
30 July 2026; 21:00	Report	Scoring by quarter: 11–17, 17–12, 15–10, 15–15			OVO Hydro; Umpires: Bronwen Adams, Georgina Sulley-Beales; Reserve umpire: Kristie Simpson
30 July 2026; 21:00	Report	Olivia Tchine 41/43 (95%); Lois Pearson 17/17 (100%)		Elmere van der Berg 48/53 (91%); Sammy Ngubane 6/7 (86%)	OVO Hydro; Umpires: Bronwen Adams, Georgina Sulley-Beales; Reserve umpire: Kristie Simpson

== Para powerlifting ==
Team England announced its para powerlifting squad of seven on 3 February 2026. Liam McGarry subsequently withdrew from the men's heavyweight event due to injury.

Athlete	Event	Result	Rank
Mark Swan	Men's lightweight	153.9	1st place, gold medalist(s)
Matthew Harding	Men's heavyweight	131.0	2nd place, silver medalist(s)
Olivia Broome	Women's lightweight	106.6	3rd place, bronze medalist(s)
Charlotte McGuinness	Women's lightweight	96.9	5
Louise Sugden	Women's heavyweight	106.5	4
Doaa Shetea	Women's heavyweight	93.3	6

== Swimming ==
Team England announced its swimming and para-swimming squad on 12 May 2026. 42 swimmers were chosen. One further swimmer was added on 2 July 2026.

Men

Athlete	Event	Heat		Semifinal		Final	
Athlete	Event	Time	Rank	Time	Rank	Time	Rank
Adam Ramsay-Peaty	50 m breaststroke	27.27	5Q	26.82	3Q	26.94	3rd place, bronze medalist(s)
Adam Ramsay-Peaty	100 m breaststroke	59.46	1Q	59.19	1Q	59.65	3rd place, bronze medalist(s)
Oliver Morgan	50 m backstroke	24.91	3Q	24.65	3Q	24.48	2nd place, silver medalist(s)
Oliver Morgan	100 m backstroke	53.65	1Q	53.09	2Q	52.66	2nd place, silver medalist(s)
Oliver Morgan	200 m backstroke	1:58.68	3Q	—		1:56.44	2nd place, silver medalist(s)
Edward Mildred	100 m butterfly	51.62	2Q	51.30	3Q	51.59	6
Edward Mildred	200 m butterfly	1:57.99	3Q	—		1:56.75	5
Jacob Mills	50 m freestyle	22.40	8Q	22.24	7Q	22.19	7
Jacob Mills	100 m freestyle	49.13	6Q	48.54	6Q	48.31	5
Jack Skerry	50 m backstroke	25.08	5Q	24.94	7Q	24.68	4
Jack Skerry	100 m backstroke	54.33	6Q	53.58	4Q	53.43	4
Jack Skerry	200 m backstroke	2:01.11	7Q	—		2:00.62	7
Greg Butler	100 m breaststroke	1:00.61	7Q	1:00.12	6Q	1:00.24	6
Greg Butler	200 m breaststroke	2:10.73	3Q	—		2:09.81	4
James Guy	200 m freestyle	1:45.69	1Q	—		1:45.72	2nd place, silver medalist(s)
James Guy	400 m freestyle	3:48.21	5Q	—		3:46.70	4
Jacob Whittle	100 m freestyle	48.78	4Q	48.60	7Q	48.76	7
Gabe Shepherd	100 m freestyle	48.44	1Q	48.36	5Q	48.52	6
Gabe Shepherd	200 m freestyle	1:48.99	11	—		did not advance	
Max Morgan	50 m breaststroke	27.77	11Q	27.93	10	did not advance	
Max Morgan	100 m breaststroke	1:01.22	10Q	1:01.29	10R	did not advance	
Cameron Brooker	50 m backstroke	25.07	4Q	24.92	6Q	25.01	8
Cameron Brooker	100 m backstroke	54.67	8Q	53.73	6Q	53.73	7
Max Litchfield	200 m medley	1:58.75	=2Q	—		1:58.62	5
Max Litchfield	400 m medley	4:16.82	3Q	—		4:14.18	5
Luke Greenbank	200 m backstroke	1:58.05	1Q	—		1:56.58	3rd place, bronze medalist(s)
Luke Greenbank	200 m butterfly	2:00.55	10	—		Did not advance	
Jacob Peters	50 m butterfly	23.74	6Q	23.49	5Q	23.46	6
Jacob Peters	100 m butterfly	52.52	8Q	52.26	7Q	52.72	8
Tom Dean	200 m freestyle	1:47.46	8Q	—		1:46.86	8
Tom Dean	200 m medley	1:58.75	=2Q	—		1:57.22	3rd place, bronze medalist(s)
Bruce Dee	50 m freestyle S7	31.50	3Q	—		31.33	3rd place, bronze medalist(s)
William Ellard	200 m freestyle S14	1:53.52 GR	1Q	—		1:51.66 GR	1st place, gold medalist(s)
Matthew Redfern	50 metre freestyle S13	25.49	4Q	—		25.36	4
Matthew Redfern	100 metre freestyle S13	58.07	5Q	—		56.86	3rd place, bronze medalist(s)
Jacob Mills; James Guy; Gabriel Shepherd; Jacob Whittle; Edward Mildred*; Cameron Brooker*; Oliver Morgan*; Tom Dean*	4 × 100 m freestyle relay	3:14.68	2Q	—		3:11.69	2nd place, silver medalist(s)
Gabriel Shepherd; Thomas Dean; James Guy; Max Litchfield; Cameron Brooker^{[a]} Jacob Whittle^{[a]} Jacob Mills^{[a]}	4 × 200 m freestyle relay	7:18.13	3Q	—		7:04.98	2nd place, silver medalist(s)
Oliver Morgan; Adam Ramsay-Peaty; Edward Mildred; Jacob Mills; Luke Greenbank; Greg Butler 'Jacob Peters; Jacob Whittle	4 × 100 m medley relay	3:35.84	2Q	—		3:30.68	2nd place, silver medalist(s)

Women

Athlete	Event	Heat		Semifinal		Final	
Athlete	Event	Time	Rank	Time	Rank	Time	Rank
Eva Okaro	100 m freestyle	55.24	7Q	55.12	10	Did not advance	
Eva Okaro	50 m butterfly	26.67	8Q	26.43	7Q	26.57	8
Freya Anderson	100 m freestyle	55.25	8Q	54.79	6Q	54.52	6Q
Freya Anderson	200 m freestyle	1:58.47	6Q	—		1:59.11	7
Freya Colbert	200 m freestyle	1:58.18	3Q	—		1:55.74	4
Freya Colbert	200 m ind. medley	2:14.04	11	—		did not advance	
Lucy Fox	100 m butterfly	1:00.66	12Q	1:00.27	10	did not advance	
Lucy Fox	200 m butterfly	2:12.09	7Q	—		2:12.18	8
Lucy Fox	400 m freestyle	4:12.98	11	—		did not advance	
Leah Schlosshan	100 m freestyle	55.30	10Q	54.82	7Q	55.02	7
Leah Schlosshan	200 m freestyle	1:58.75	7Q	—		1:58.11	6
Amelie Blocksidge	400 m freestyle	4:18.13	16	—		did not advance	
Amelie Blocksidge	800 m freestyle	—				8:38.80	8
Amelie Blocksidge	1500 m freestyle	—				16:27.55	7
Lauren Cox	50 m backstroke	28.14	3Q	27.85	3Q	27.56	3rd place, bronze medalist(s)
Lauren Cox	100 m backstroke	1:01.12	6Q	1:00.39	4Q	1:00.35	5
Abbie Wood	200 m breaststroke	2:31.74	10	—		did not advance	
Abbie Wood	200 m ind. medley	2:11.69	4Q	—		1:11.33	8
Emily Richards	100 m butterfly	59.13	7Q	58.59	9	did not advance	
Emily Richards	200 m butterfly	2:11.15	5Q	—		2:09.12	5
Amalie Smith	400 m freestyle	4:12.97	10	—		did not advance	
Amalie Smith	200 m ind. medley	2:11.38	3Q	—		2:09.61	3rd place, bronze medalist(s)
Amalie Smith	400 m ind. medley	4:39.13	1Q	—		4:33.70	2nd place, silver medalist(s)
Imogen Clark	50 m breaststroke	31.25	6Q	30.94	3Q	30.86	3rd place, bronze medalist(s)
Darcy Revitt	50 m freestyle	25.17	7Q	25.34	8Q	25.17	8
Gabrielle Idle-Beavers	50 m breaststroke	31.32	7Q	31.19	6Q	31.36	7
Gabrielle Idle-Beavers	100 m breaststroke	1:09.34	14Q	1:09.27	11	did not advance	
Alice Tai	100 m backstroke S9	1:16.77	5Q	—		1:11.93	1st place, gold medalist(s)
Brock Whiston	100 m breaststroke SB8	1;27.02	1Q	—		1:22.05	1st place, gold medalist(s)
Brock Whiston	200 m ind. medley SM10	2:47.98	6Q	—		2:46.53	7
Brooklyn Hale	100 m freestyle S9	1:06.66	5Q	—		1:06.52	5
Brooklyn Hale	100 m backstroke S9	1:15.91	3Q	—		1:16.27	5
Brooklyn Hale	200 m ind. medley SM9	DSQ		—		did not advance	
Evie Lambert	100 m freestyle S9	1:07.18	6Q	—		1:07.07	6
Evie Lambert	200 m ind. medley SB9	2:51.59	8Q	—		2:47.46	8
Georgia Sheffield	200 m freestyle S14	2:10.90	3Q	—		2:06.07	1st place, gold medalist(s)
Rebecca Redfern	50 m freestyle S13	30.74	8Q	—		31.04	8
Iona Winnifrith	100 m breaststroke SB8	1:27.04	2Q	—		1;26.31	3rd place, bronze medalist(s)
Isabella Haynes	100 m breaststroke SB8	1:37.57	6Q	—		1:34.35	6
Isabella Haynes	100 m backstroke S9	1:17.28	6Q	—		1:17.52	8
Louise Fiddes	200 m freestyle S14	2:12.46	5Q	—		2:11.38	5
Poppy Maskill	200 m freestyle S14	2:10.71	2Q	—		2:07.44	2nd place, silver medalist(s)
Ursula Carroll	50 m freestyle S13	30.10	6Q	—		29.37	5
Ursula Carroll	100 m freestyle S13	1:05.25	5Q	—		1:05.24	6
Eva Okaro; Freya Colbert; Leah Schlosshan; Freya Anderson; Abbie Wood*; Erin Little*; Darcy Revitt*; Amalie Smith*	4 × 100 m freestyle relay	3:40.92	2Q	—		3:35.66	2nd place, silver medalist(s)
Freya Colbert; Leah Schlosshan 'Abbie Wood; Freya Anderson	4 × 200 m freestyle relay	—		—		7:50.10	2nd place, silver medalist(s)
Lauren Cox; Amalie Smith; Emily Richards; Freya Colbert '* Gabrielle Idle-Beavers * Erin Little	4 × 100 m medley relay	4:05.57	3Q	—		4:00.74	5

Mixed

Athlete	Event	Heat		Final	
Athlete	Event	Time	Rank	Time	Rank
Jacob Mills; Jacob Whittle; Freya Anderson; Freya Colbert; Gabriel Shepherd*; Tom Dean*; Abbie Wood*; Erin Little*	4 × 100 m mixed freestyle	3:26.56	2Q	3:23.91	2nd place, silver medalist(s)
Lauren Cox; Adam Ramsay-Peaty; Edward Mildred; Freya Colbert; Luke Greenbank*; Max Morgan*; Emily Richards*; Freya Anderson*	4 × 100 m mixed medley	3:48.68	3Q	3:45.59	5

== Weightlifting ==
On 18 May 2026, the IWF Commonwealth Games weightlifting ranking lists were finalised. The top eight ranked lifters, limited to one per CGA, and not including Scotland (who got automatic host spots) and the directly qualified reigning Commonwealth Weightlifting champions, gained a quota place for the games in their weight class.

Team England were awarded fifteen quota places out of a maximum sixteen, including multiple European champions Sarah Davies and Emily Campbell. Commonwealth Weightlifting Championships gold medalist from 2023, Cyrille Tchatchet, competed for England for the second time at the Games, 12 years after representing Cameroon in the previous Glasgow Games; Tchatchet sought asylum shortly thereafter, before representing the Refugee Olympic Team and then Great Britain from 2022. Fellow former Cameroonian and Olympic medalist Madias Nzesso Ngake also makes her Commonwealth Games debut for England, having sought asylum in Great Britain following the London 2012 Olympic Games after being outed as lesbian in Cameroon, where homosexuality remains a criminal offence.

Men

Athlete	Event	Snatch (kg)		Clean & Jerk (kg)		Total (kg)	Rank
Athlete	Event	Result	Rank	Result	Rank	Total (kg)	Rank
Kieran Styles	60 kg	95	10	126	7	221	7
Jonathan Chin	71 kg	129	5	170	3	299	4
Chris Murray	79 kg	148	2	177	3	325	3rd place, bronze medalist(s)
Christopher Russ	88 kg	139	5	169	6	308	4
Joshua Hutton	94 kg	153	3	NM	DNF		
Cyrille Tchatchet II	110 kg	166	2	208	1	374	2nd place, silver medalist(s)
Andrew Griffiths	+110 kg	165	3	191	3	356	3rd place, bronze medalist(s)

Women

Athlete	Event	Snatch (kg)		Clean & Jerk (kg)		Total (kg)	Rank
Athlete	Event	Result	Rank	Result	Rank	Total (kg)	Rank
Tammy Wong	48 kg	71	4	89	5	160	5
Noorin Gulam	53 kg	75	5	92	8	167	7
Eliza Pratt	58 kg	87	4	109	4	196	4
Sarah Davies	63 kg	95	4	122	2	217	2nd place, silver medalist(s)
Erin Barton	69 kg	91	7	119	5	210	6
Isabella Brown	77 kg	97	4	132 GR	1	229	2nd place, silver medalist(s)
Madias Nzesso Ngake	86 kg	111 GR	1	128	2	239	2nd place, silver medalist(s)
Emily Campbell	+86 kg	115	1	163 CR GR	1	278 GR	1st place, gold medalist(s)
