= 3x3 basketball at the 2026 Commonwealth Games =

Sport due to held at 2026 Commonwealth Games

- Pictogram of 3x3 basketball
- Venue: SEC Centre, Glasgow
- Dates: 24 – 29 July 2026
- Competitors: 160 from 19 nations

3x3 basketball was among the sports contested at the 2026 Commonwealth Games, held in Glasgow, Scotland. This variation of basketball and its wheelchair counterpart were staged at the Games for the second time following its debut at the previous games. All four tournaments took place between 24 and 29 July 2026.

The able-bodied tournaments were expanded to twelve teams each, while the wheelchair tournaments expanded to eight teams each.

== Schedule ==
The competition schedule was as follows:

G	Group stage	CM	Classification matches	¼	Quarter-finals	½	Semi-finals	B	Bronze medal match	F	Gold medal match

Date Event	Fri 24			Sat 25			Sun 26		Mon 27		Tue 28	Wed 29		
Session →	M	A	E	M	A	E	A	E	A	E	A	A	E	
Men	G			G			G		G		¼	½	B	F
Women	G			G			G		G		¼	½	B	F
Men WC	G			G			G		G		¼	½	B	F
Women WC	G			G			G		G		¼	½	B	F

== Venue ==
The competitions were held at the SEC Centre, Glasgow, alongside indoor bowls, boxing and judo.

== Medal summary ==
=== Medal table ===
* Host nation (Scotland)

Rank	Nation	Gold	Silver	Bronze	Total
1	Australia	2	1	1	4
2	England	2	1	0	3
3	Scotland*	0	1	1	2
4	Uganda	0	1	0	1
5	Canada	0	0	1	1
5	New Zealand	0	0	1	1
Totals (6 entries)		4	4	4	12

=== Medallists ===
Event	Gold	Silver	Bronze
Men	England; Jamell Anderson; Ashley Hamilton; Dwayne Lautier-Ogunleye; Evan Walshe	Australia; Jonah Antonio; Jarred Bairstow; Samuel McDaniel; Jesse Wagstaff	Scotland; Kyle Jimenez; Fraser Malcolm; Owen McCormack; Skyler White
Women	Australia; Amy Atwell; Emma Clarke; Lara McSpadden; Marena Whittle	Uganda; Jane Asinde; Melissa Akullu; Jamila Nansikombi; Peres Nyamwenge	New Zealand; Azure Anderson; Ella Fotu; Eva Langton; Sharne Pupuke-Robati
Wheelchair men	Australia; Tomas Klein; Eithen Leard; Tom O'Neill-Thorne; Luke Pople	England; James Hazell; Tom Harvey; Oscar Knight; Peter Cusack	Canada; Garrett Ostepchuk; Lee Melymick; Kyrell Sopotyk; Reed De’Aeth
Wheelchair women	England; Charlotte Moore; Joy Haizelden; Jade Atkin; Lucy Robinson	Scotland; Kayli English; Robyn Love; Lea Smith; Jodie Waite	Australia; Hannah Dodd; Georgia Munro-Cook; Taishar Ovens; Ebony Stevenson

== Qualification ==
=== Summary ===
CGA	Men		Women		Athletes
CGA	3x3	WC	3x3	WC	Athletes
Australia	Yes	Yes	Yes	Yes	16
Canada		Yes		Yes	8
Cayman Islands	Yes		Yes		8
England	Yes	Yes	Yes	Yes	16
Fiji	Yes		Yes		8
Guyana	Yes				4
India				Yes	4
Jamaica	Yes		Yes		8
Kenya	Yes	Yes	Yes		12
Malaysia	Yes	Yes			8
New Zealand	Yes		Yes		8
Nigeria	Yes			Yes	8
Papua New Guinea			Yes		4
Scotland	Yes	Yes	Yes	Yes	16
Singapore	Yes		Yes		8
South Africa		Yes		Yes	8
Tonga			Yes		4
Uganda			Yes		4
Wales		Yes		Yes	8
Total: 19 CGAs	12	8	12	8	160

=== 3x3 basketball ===
Twelve nations qualify for each tournament at the 2026 Commonwealth Games:

- The host nation;
- Winner of the 3x3 competition at the Pacific Mini Games;
- The top nation in the FIBA 3x3 Federation Rankings from each of the other five CGF regions;
- The five highest-ranked nations not already qualified.

As Great Britain were the highest ranked European region nation in all four competitions, but do not participate as Great Britain at the Commonwealth Games, a Home Nations Qualifier will be held in each event to select the Great Britain/Europe Entrant.

Men

Means of qualification	Quotas	Qualified
Host Nation	1	Scotland
2025 Pacific Mini Games	1	Fiji
FIBA 3x3 Federation Rankings (Regional Qualification)	4	Kenya; Singapore; Cayman Islands; Australia
FIBA 3x3 Federation Rankings (Open Qualification)	5	New Zealand; Nigeria; Jamaica; Malaysia; Guyana
Home Nations Qualifier	1	England
TOTAL	12	

Women

Means of qualification	Quotas	Qualified
Host Nation	1	Scotland
2025 Pacific Mini Games	1	Fiji
FIBA 3x3 Federation Rankings (Regional Qualification)	4	Kenya; Singapore; Cayman Islands; Australia
FIBA 3x3 Federation Rankings (Open Qualification)	5	New Zealand; Uganda; Jamaica; Papua New Guinea; Tonga
Home Nations Qualifier	1	England
TOTAL	12	

;Notes

=== 3x3 wheelchair basketball ===
Eight nations qualify for each tournament at the 2026 Commonwealth Games:

- The host nation.
- The winners of the four IWBF Zonal Qualifiers, with two teams coming from the combined Asia-Pacific competition.
- two nations not already qualified will receive a CGF/IWBF Bipartite Invitation.

Men

Means of qualification	Quotas	Qualified
Host Nation	1	Scotland
IWBF Africa Qualifier	1	South Africa
IWBF Americas Qualifier	1	Canada
IWBF Asia-Pacific	2	Malaysia; Australia
IWBF Europe Qualifier	1	England
Bipartite Invitation	2	Wales; Kenya
TOTAL	8	

Women

Means of qualification	Quotas	Qualified
Host Nation	1	Scotland
IWBF Africa Qualifier	1	Nigeria
IWBF Americas Qualifier	1	Canada
IWBF Asia-Pacific	2	India; Australia
IWBF Europe Qualifier	1	England
Bipartite Invitation	2	Wales; South Africa
TOTAL	8	
