= Hannah Dodd =

Hannah Dodd may refer to:

- Hannah Dodd (Paralympian) (born 1992), Australian Paralympian in the equestrian and wheelchair basketball events
- Hannah Dodd (actress) (born 1995), English actress and model
