= Ebony Stevenson =

Australian wheelchair basketball player (born 2009)

- Stevenson at the 2026 Wheelchair Basketball World Championships in Ottawa

Personal information
- Born: 24 December 2009 (age 16)

Sport
- Sport: Wheelchair basketball
- Position: Guard/Forward
- Disability class: 3.0
- Club: Perth Wheelcat
Medal record
Women's 3x3 wheelchair basketball
Representing Australia
Commonwealth Games
Bronze medal – third place	2026 Glasgow	Team

Ebony Stevenson (born 24 December 2009) is an Australian wheelchair basketball player. In 2026, she won a bronze medal in the 3x3 wheelchair basketball tournament at the 2026 Commonwealth Games and played for the national team (the Gliders) at the 2026 Wheelchair Basketball World Championships in Ottawa, Canada. In 2025, she was named the Western Australian Institute of Sport Young Athlete of the Year.

== Personal life ==
Ebony Stevenson was born on 24 December 2009. In 2018, when she was eight years old, Stevenson suffered a spinal cord stroke that left her paralyzed from the waist down. While in the Perth Children's Hospital, she met Paralympian wheelchair basketball player Natalie Alexander, who gave her a pamphlet regarding a para-sport "come and try" night. Like most people, Stevenson had never sat in a wheelchair basketball chair before. "It honestly felt electric", she later recalled. "When I used to run, I could go so fast, and suddenly I could do that again – just in a chair.”

== Career ==
Stevenson began training at the Western Australian Institute of Sport (WAIS). By the end of the year she had secured a WAIS scholarship. She soon went on to play with the Perth Wheelcats in the Women's National Wheelchair Basketball League, then the Under-25 national squad (the Devils) at the 2023 Women's U25 Wheelchair Basketball World Championship, and ultimately the senior team (the Gliders). In 2025, she was named the WAIS Young Athlete of the Year.

In July 2026, Stevenson competed at the 2026 Commonwealth Games and won a bronze medal in the 3x3 wheelchair basketball tournament with the Wombats. At 16 years of age she was the youngest player on the team. She has worn Converse footwear since she was 13. Indigenous artist Joanne Hill decorated a special pair for her to wear at the Commonwealth Games.

Stevenson was part of the Gliders line up for the Repechage tournament in Guadalajara, Spain, at which the Gliders secured a place at the 2026 Wheelchair Basketball World Championships in Ottawa, Canada, and she played with the Gliders there.
