= Taishar Ovens =

Australian wheelchair basketball player

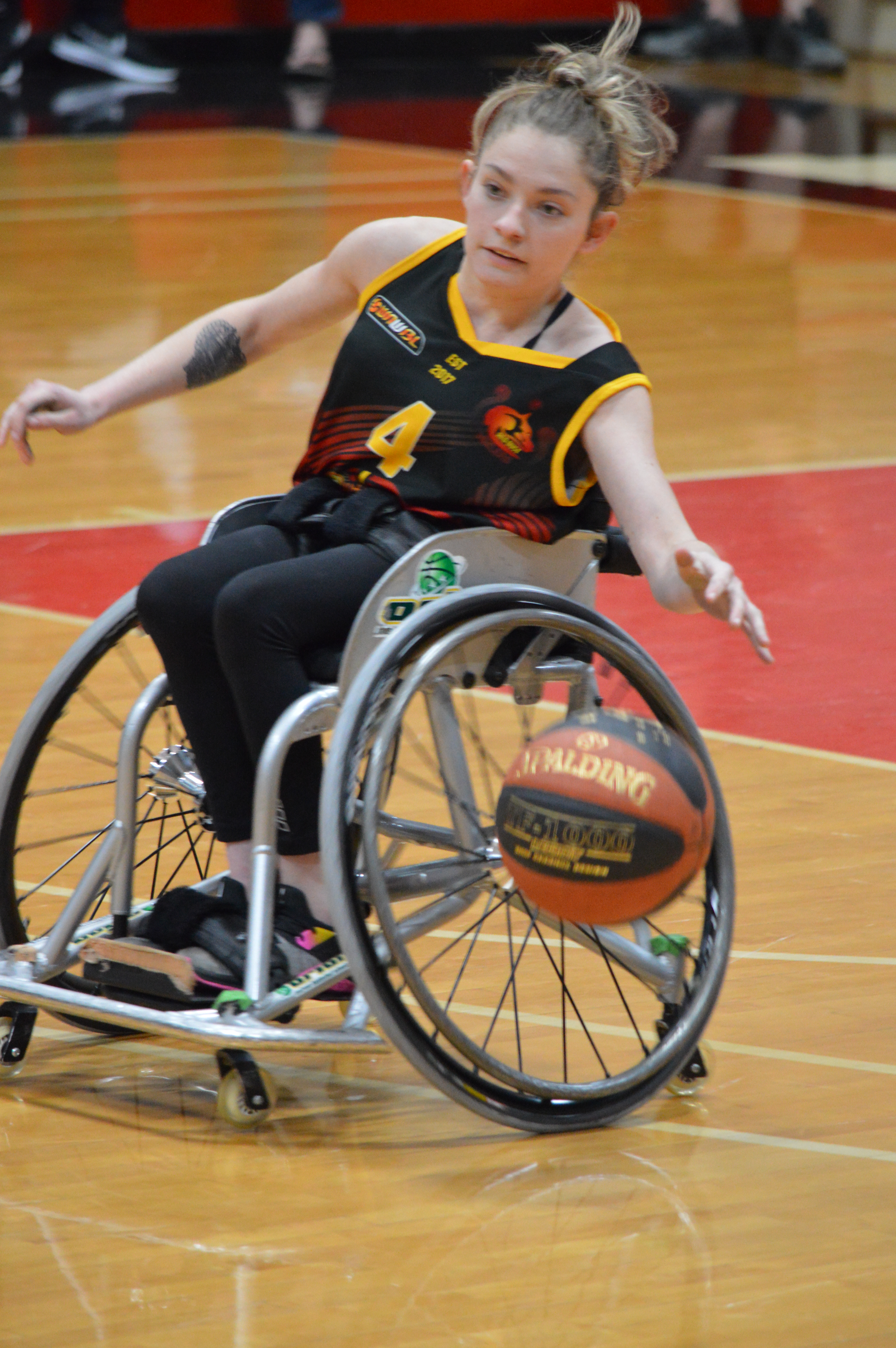

Personal information
- Nationality: Australian
- Born: 7 April 1998 (age 28)

Sport
- Country: Australia
- Sport: Wheelchair basketball
- Disability class: 1.0
- Event: Women's team
- Club: Red Dust Lady Heelers
Medal record
Women's 3x3 wheelchair basketball
Representing Australia
Commonwealth Games
Bronze medal – third place	2026 Glasgow	Team

Taishar Ovens (born 7 April 1998) is a 1.0 point Australian wheelchair basketball player. She represented Australia at the 2020 Summer Paralympics in Tokyo.

== Biography ==
Taishar Ovens was born with scoliosis. In 2008, she had corrective surgery but had a spinal stroke which left her paralysed. She has several qualifications - Certificate III and IV in Fitness and Certificate III in Events. She has worked as a CrossFit coach. In April 2021, she took up a traineeship position at VisAbility's CoAct Disability Employment Services in Perth.

== Career ==
A 1.0 point player. She was a member of the Australian teams that won the silver medal at the 2019 Women's U25 Wheelchair Basketball World Championship. At the 2020 Tokyo Paralympics, the Gliders finished ninth after winning the 9th-10th classification match.

She is coached by Australian Paralympian Brad Ness.
