= Jodie Waite =

Irish wheelchair basketball player (born 2004)

Personal information
- Born: 23 March 2004 (age 22) Limerick, Ireland

Sport
- Sport: Wheelchair basketball
- Disability: Transverse myelitis
- Disability class: 1.0
Medal record
Women's 3x3 wheelchair basketball
Representing Scotland
Commonwealth Games
Silver medal – second place	2026 Glasgow	Team

Jodie Waite (born 23 March 2004) is an Irish wheelchair basketball player and a member of Great Britain women's national wheelchair basketball team. She represented Great Britain at the 2024 Summer Paralympics.

== Career ==
Waite was named female wheelchair basketball player of the year three consecutive times in 2020, 2021 and 2022 by Basketball Ireland. In July 2024, she was selected to represent Great Britain at the 2024 Summer Paralympics in wheelchair basketball.

In July 2026, she represented Scotland at the 2026 Commonwealth Games and won a silver medal in the 3x3 wheelchair basketball tournament. During the final against England she recorded two rebounds off the bench.

== Personal life ==
Waite was diagnosed with transverse myelitis at 13 years old, a condition that left her paralyzed.
