= Lucy Robinson (wheelchair basketball) =

British wheelchair basketball player

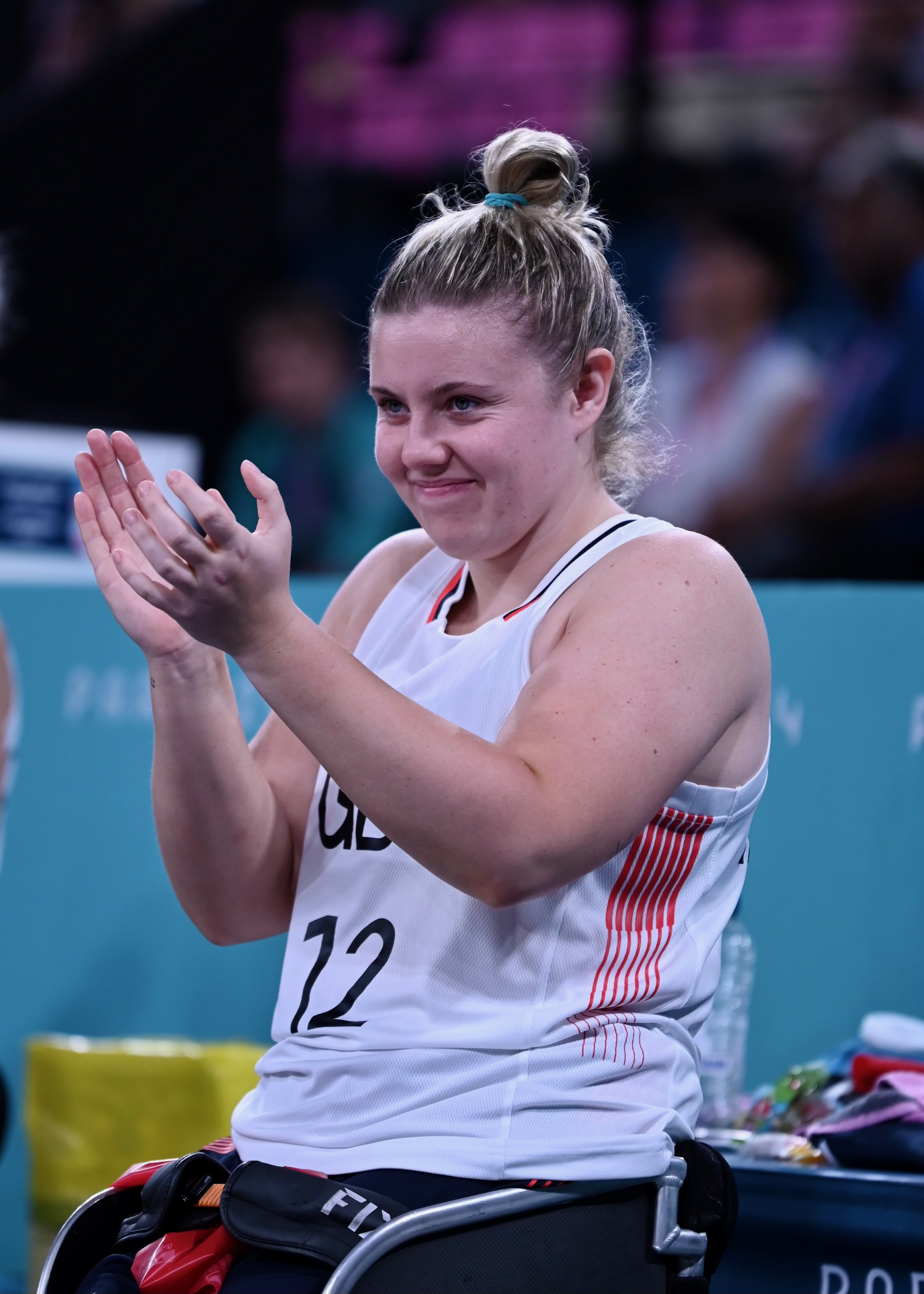
- Robinson at the 2024 Summer Paralympics

Personal information
- Nationality: British
- Born: 21 May 1999 (age 27)

Sport
- Country: United Kingdom
- Sport: Wheelchair basketball
- Disability: avascular necrosis
- Disability class: 4.5
- Club: Loughborough Lightning Wheelchair Basketball Club
Medal record
Women's wheelchair basketball
Representing Great Britain
European Championships
Silver medal – second place	2023 Rotterdam	Team
Silver medal – second place	2025 Sarajevo	Team
Women's 3x3 wheelchair basketball
Representing England
Commonwealth Games
Gold medal – first place	2026 Glasgow	Team

Lucy Robinson (born 21 May 1999) is a British 4.5-point wheelchair basketball player from Leicester. She played for the Great Britain women's national wheelchair basketball team in the delayed 2020 Summer Paralympics in Tokyo and in the 2024 Summer Paralympics in Paris.

== Career ==
Lucy Robinson was born on 21 May 1999. She comes from Mountsorrel and is a primary school teacher. She broke her hip in a roller skating accident. This led to avascular necrosis, a condition causing cellular death in the bone due to interrupted blood supply.

After her injury she was unable to continue playing association football. As a teenager, she started playing wheelchair basketball at the Leicester Cobras club in Leicester after a wheelchair basketball trial event at the club. She studied at the Sheffield Hallam University. She is a member of Sheffield Hallam Wheelchair Basketball club, and currently plays for Loughborough Lightning Wheelchair Basketball. She is a 4.5 point player.

At the 2018 International Wheelchair Basketball Federation U24 European championship, she helped secure a gold medal for Great Britain. She earned a bronze medal at the 2019 Women's U25 Wheelchair Basketball World Championship. She was named 2020 Sportswoman of the Year at the Team Hallam Sports Ball and her team Sheffield Hallam Wheelchair Basketball club was named 2020 Team of the Year. In 2021 she made her debut appearance as a senior with the Great Britain women's national wheelchair basketball team in the delayed 2020 Summer Paralympics in Tokyo. She played for the team again at the 2024 Summer Paralympics in Paris.

== Personal life ==
Robinson is a part of the LGBTQ+ community.
