= Georgia Munro-Cook =

Australian wheelchair basketball player

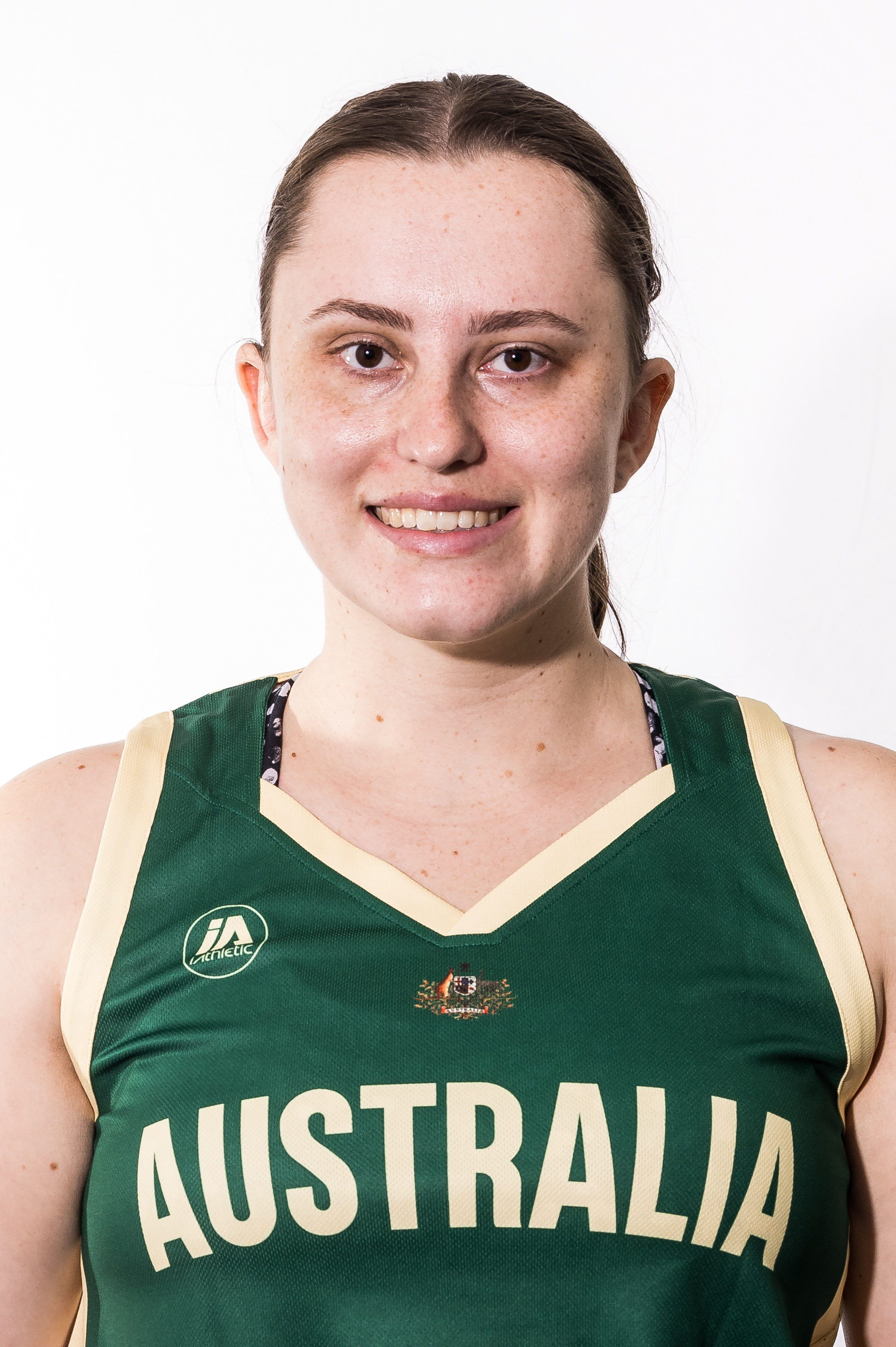
- Munro-Cook with the Australian Gliders in 2023

Personal information
- Nationality: Australia
- Born: 17 May 1994 (age 32)

Sport
- Country: Australia
- Sport: Wheelchair basketball
- Position: forward / centre
- Disability class: 4.5
- Club: Sydney Metro Blues
Medal record
Representing Australia
Women's wheelchair basketball
U25 Women's World Championships
Silver medal – second place	2015 Beijing	Team
Women's 3x3 wheelchair basketball
Commonwealth Games
Bronze medal – third place	2026 Glasgow	Team

Georgia Munro-Cook (born 17 May 1994) is an Australian 4.5 point wheelchair basketball player. She represented Australia at the 2018 Wheelchair Basketball World Championship in Hamburg, the 2020 Summer Paralympics in Tokyo, and the 2022 Wheelchair Basketball World Championships in Dubai.

== Biography ==
Munro-Cook was born on 17 May 1994, the daughter of Meg Munro and Murray Cook; her father is one of the original members of the children's band The Wiggles. As a child, she appeared in seven of The Wiggles' videos, including Big Red Car, Wake Up Jeff!, Wiggly, Wiggly Christmas, It's a Wiggly Wiggly World, Hoop Dee Doo: It's a Wiggly Party and Yule Be Wiggling. She attended Newtown High School of the Performing Arts, earning high marks in English, Mathematics, Science, Australian History and Australian Geography. She attended the University of Sydney, where she wrote her PhD thesis on the history of the Women's National Basketball Association. As of 2023, she works as a postgraduate researcher.

Munro-Cook played able-bodied basketball until she was 18, but had to stop when she was diagnosed with hip dysplasia. However, she soon found a substitute in wheelchair basketball. "It gave me an outlet and a passion to pursue," she recalled. She is a tall forward/centre who is classified a 4.5 point player. In 2014, she joined the Sachs Goudcamp Bears, one of the teams in the Women's National Wheelchair Basketball League. The team was renamed the Sydney Metro Blues in 2016, and won the league championship in 2017. That season, Munro-Cook had five double-doubles. She led the Sydney Metro Blues for scoring, and was second for assists. She was also named to the All-Star Five. She also played for the New South Wales junior side that won the Kevin Coombs Cup in 2016.

In 2015, Munro-Cook was selected as a member of the under 25 national side (the Devils) for the 2015 Women's U25 Wheelchair Basketball World Championship in Beijing. Later that year she played with the senior team, the Gliders, at the 2015 IWBF Asia-Oceania Championships in Chiba, Japan, in October 2015. She subsequently joined the Gliders for the Osaka Cup in Japan in 2016, and the 2017 IWBF Asia-Oceania Championships back in Beijing in October 2017.

She represented Australia at the 2018 Wheelchair Basketball World Championship in Hamburg, where the team came ninth, and at the 2020 Tokyo Paralympics, where the Gliders also finished ninth after winning the 9th-10th classification match. In June 2023, she was a member of the Gliders team at the 2022 Wheelchair Basketball World Championships in Dubai.
