= Jade Atkin =

British wheelchair basketball player (born 2001)

- Atkin at the 2026 Wheelchair Basketball World Championships

Personal information
- Born: 18 September 2001 (age 25) Portsmouth, England

Sport
- Sport: Wheelchair basketball
- Disability: Hereditary spastic paraplegia
- Disability class: 4.5
Medal record
Women's wheelchair basketball
Representing Great Britain
European Championships
Silver medal – second place	2023 Rotterdam	Team
Silver medal – second place	2025 Sarajevo	Team
Women's 3x3 wheelchair basketball
Representing England
Commonwealth Games
Gold medal – first place	2026 Glasgow	Team
Bronze medal – third place	2022 Birmingham	Team

Jade Atkin (born 18 September 2001) is a British wheelchair basketball player and a member of Great Britain women's national wheelchair basketball team. She represented Great Britain at the 2024 Summer Paralympics.

== Career ==
Atkin represented England at the 2022 Commonwealth Games and won a bronze medal in the inaugural wheelchair basketball tournament.

She represented Great Britain at the 2023 IWBF Women's European Championship and won a silver medal. With the win, Great Britain qualified for the 2024 Summer Paralympics. She represented Great Britain at the 2024 Summer Paralympics in wheelchair basketball. During the quarterfinals against the United States, she recorded a team-high 15 points in a 59–52 loss.

On 11 August 2025, she was selected to represent Great Britain at the 2025 European Wheelchair Basketball Championship. She helped Great Britain win a silver medal.

In July 2026, she competed at the 2026 Commonwealth Games and won a gold medal in the wheelchair basketball tournament. She then represented Great Britain at the 2026 Wheelchair Basketball World Championships.

== Personal life ==
Atkin was diagnosed with Hereditary spastic paraplegia.
