= Swimming at the 2026 Commonwealth Games – Men's 200 metre backstroke =

Men's 200 metre backstroke at the 2026 Commonwealth Games
- Venue: Tollcross International Swimming Centre
- Dates: 26 July
- Winning time: 1:54.22 GR

Medalists
gold medal	Pieter Coetze	South Africa
silver medal	Oliver Morgan	England
bronze medal	Luke Greenbank	England

The men's 200 metre backstroke event at the 2026 Commonwealth Games was held on 26 July at the Tollcross International Swimming Centre.

== Records ==
Prior to this competition, the existing world, Commonwealth and Games records were as follows:

Records before the 2026 Commonwealth Games
Record	Time	Athlete (nation)	Meet	Location	Date	Ref
World record	1:51.92	Aaron Peirsol (USA)	2009 World Championships	Rome, Italy	31 July, 2009	
Commonwealth record	1:53.17	Mitch Larkin (AUS)	World Cup	Dubai, UAE	7 November 2015	
Games record	1:55.58	James Goddard (ENG)	2010 Commonwealth Games	Delhi, India	6 October 2010	

== Schedule ==
The schedule is as follows:

All times are British Summer Time (UTC+1)

Date	Time	Round
Sunday 26 July 2026	10:30	Heats
Sunday 26 July 2026	19:00	Final

== Results ==
=== Heats ===
The heats will be held on the morning of 26 July 2026.

Heat results
Rank	Heat	Lane	Swimmer	Nation	Time	Notes
1	1	4	Luke Greenbank	England	1:58.05	Q
2	3	4	Pieter Coetze	South Africa	1:58.48	Q
3	2	4	Oliver Morgan	England	1:58.68	Q
4	3	5	Se-Bom Lee	Australia	1:58.82	Q
5	2	5	Henry Allan	Australia	1:59.34	Q
6	3	3	Benjamin Loewen	Canada	2:00.77	Q
7	1	5	Jack Skerry	England	2:01.11	Q
8	1	3	Isaac Thompson	Jersey	2:03.66	Q
9	3	6	Benjamin Winterborn	Canada	2:05.44	R
10	3	1	Samuel Sterry	Jersey	2:08.24	R
11	2	6	Charles Foster	Isle of Man	2:08.59	
12	1	6	Oscar Dodds	Jersey	2:08.93	
13	3	2	Luke Higgo	Cayman Islands	2:10.13	
14	2	2	Joel Ling	Brunei	2:11.00	
15	1	2	Carter Makira	Cook Islands	2:13.69	
16	1	7	Will Sellars	Cayman Islands	2:15.78	
17	3	7	Zachary Maiden	Guernsey	2:19.26	
18	2	7	Henry Bolton	Guernsey	2:26.87	
	2	3	Matthew Ward	Scotland		DNS

=== Final ===
The final took place during of the evening of 26 July 2026.

Final results
Rank	Lane	Swimmer	Nation	Time	Notes
1st place, gold medalist(s)	5	Pieter Coetze	South Africa	1:54.22	GR
2nd place, silver medalist(s)	3	Oliver Morgan	England	1:56.44	
3rd place, bronze medalist(s)	4	Luke Greenbank	England	1:56.58	
4	6	Se-Bom Lee	Australia	1:56.78	
5	2	Henry Allan	Australia	1:57.05	
6	7	Benjamin Loewen	Canada	1:58.48	
7	1	Jack Skerry	England	2:00.62	
8	8	Isaac Thompson	Jersey	2:03.73	
