= Track cycling at the 2026 Commonwealth Games – Women's 1 km time trial C4–5 =

Cycling Track – Women's time trial C4-5 at the 2026 Commonwealth Games
- Venue: Sir Chris Hoy Velodrome
- Dates: 2 August
- Competitors: 6 from 6 nations
- Winning time: 1:09.667 WR

Medalists
gold medal	Tara Neyland	Australia
silver medal	Kadeena Cox	England
bronze medal	Erin Normoyle	Australia

The women's time trial 4-5 at the 2026 Commonwealth Games was part of the cycling programme, and took place on 2 August 2026. The event was new on the Commonwealth Games schedule, and was won by Australian Tara Neyland.

== Records ==
Prior to this competition, the existing world and Games records were as follows:

World records - Women's 1 km time trial C
C4	Tara Neyland (AUS)	1:10.806	Rio de Janeiro (Brazil)	17 October 2025
C5	Claudia Cretti (ITA)	1:12.028	Rio de Janeiro (Brazil)	16 October 2025

== Schedule ==
The schedule was as follows:

All times are British Summer Time (UTC+1)

Date	Time	Round
Sunday 2 August 2026	16:15	Finals

== Results ==
The C4-5 time trial was a factored event, with the actual time of each cyclist multiplied by a factor consistent with their classification to allow for fair competition between classifications. The unfactored results counted for world and Games records within each classification. The results of the women's time trial C4-5 were therefore as follows:

Rank	Name	Country	Actual time	Classification	Factor (%)	Factored time
1st place, gold medalist(s)	Tara Neyland	Australia	1:09.667 WR	C4	98.7	1:08.761
2nd place, silver medalist(s)	Kadeena Cox	England	1:10.864	C4	98.7	1:09.943
3rd place, bronze medalist(s)	Erin Normoyle	Australia	1:14.511	C4	98.7	1:13.542
4	Nicole Murray	New Zealand	1:13.653; C5 GR	C5	100	1:13.653
5	Morgan Newberry	England	1:18.332	C5	100	1:18.332
6	Lisha Das	India	1:34.410	C5	100	1:34.410
