= Hannah Dodd (Paralympian) =

Australian female equestrian Paralympian (born 1992)

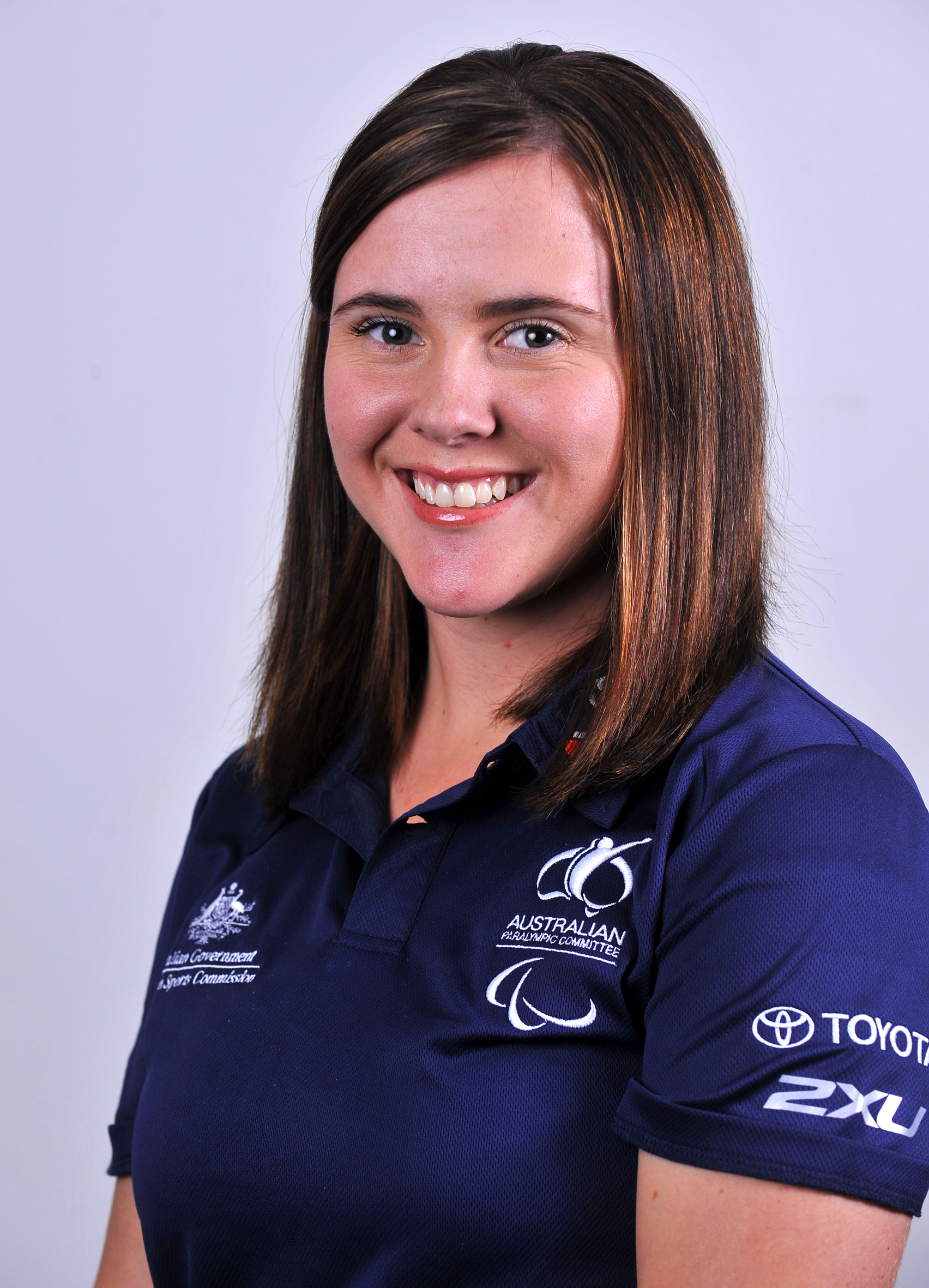
- 2012 Australian Paralympic Team portrait of Dodd

Personal information
- Nationality: Australia
- Born: 27 April 1992 (age 34)

Sport
- Country: Australia
- Sport: Equestrian; Wheelchair basketball
- Disability class: Grade IV; 1.0
- Club: Sydney University Flames
Medal record
Representing Australia
Women's wheelchair basketball
U25 Women's World Championships
Silver medal – second place	2015 Beijing	Team
Women's 3x3 wheelchair basketball
Commonwealth Games
Silver medal – second place	2022 Birmingham	Team
Bronze medal – third place	2026 Glasgow	Team

Hannah Dodd (born 27 April 1992) is an Australian Grade IV equestrian and 1.0 point wheelchair basketball player who represented Australia in equestrian at the 2012 Summer Paralympics in London, coming 11th and 12th in her events. Switching to wheelchair basketball, she made her debut with the national team at the Osaka Cup in February 2015.

In 2008, Dodd was the Australian national Grade IV para-equestrian champion. She was runner-up in 2009, and won the Australian national championships again in 2011, along with the Oceania Championships and the National Titles team events. By 2012, she was the top-ranked Australian competitor in her event and class.

After the London Paralympics, Dodd took up wheelchair basketball. She started playing for the Sydney University Flames in the Women's National Wheelchair Basketball League in 2013, made her debut with the national team at the Osaka Friendship Games in Osaka in February 2015, winning bronze, and was part of the Under 25 team at the 2015 Women's U25 Wheelchair Basketball World Championship in Beijing in July 2015, winning silver.

She represented Australia at the 2018 Wheelchair Basketball World Championship in Hamburg, the 2020 Summer Paralympics in Tokyo and the 2022 Wheelchair Basketball World Championships in Dubai and won silver in the 3x3 Women's tournament at the 2022 Commonwealth Games in Birmingham.

== Personal ==
Hannah Dodd was born on 27 April 1992, and is from Arcadia, New South Wales. She has sacral agenesis with upper limb dystonia, and is missing four vertebrae in her back. When she was about a year old, her kidneys started failing. Her entire renal system needed to be reconstructed. She has two older brothers. She can walk with the aide of a caliper, and also uses a wheelchair. As of 2012, she is a horse riding teacher and student at the University of Western Sydney where she is majoring in sports and exercise science.

== Equestrian ==
Dodd is a Grade IV equestrian competitor, coached by Peter Turner. Due to her sacral agenesis, when she rides her horse, she dislocates several bones every time, but as a result of anti-doping rules, she has had to find alternative ways of coping with pain associated with riding.

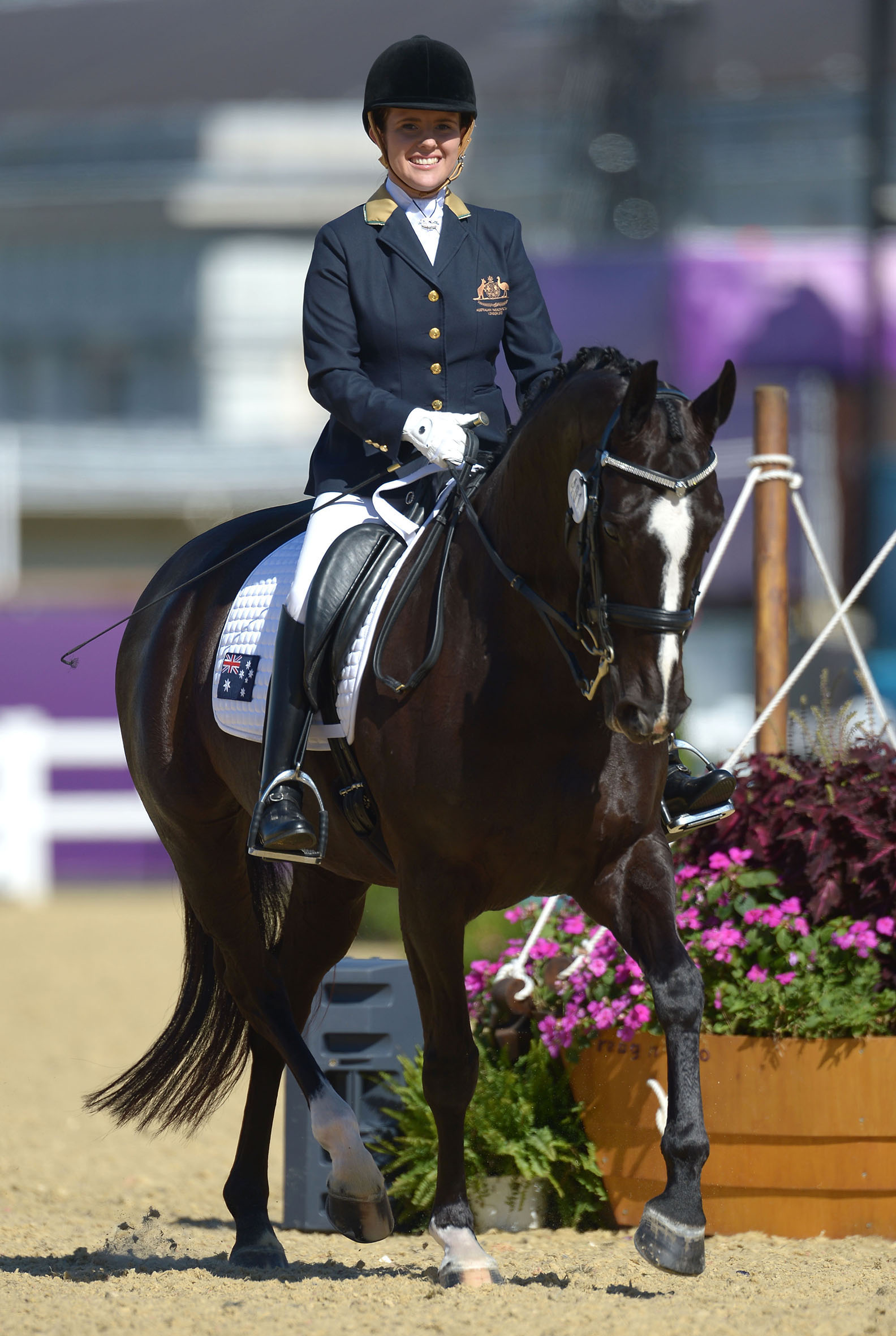
Dodd riding at the 2012 London Paralympics

Dodd has been around horses since she was four months old, and was able to ride on her own by the time she was two years old, before she learned to walk. The sport gave her a degree of independence. She started competing in 2005, and first represented Australia in 2006, winning her first test in England that year. In 2008, she became the youngest-ever winner of the Australian national championships. She finished first at the March 2009 inter-schools cup at the St Ives Showground, and second at the 2009 Australian national championships, but her horse, Lucifer's Dream, was injured in 2009. In 2009 and 2010, she searched for another horse to assist her in getting through Paralympic qualification. She won the Australian national championships again in 2011, along with the Oceania Championships and the National Titles team events. By 2012, she was the top-ranked Australian competitor in her event and class.

Dodd was selected to represent Australia at the 2012 Summer Paralympics in London in equestrian events with her horse Waikiwi. These Games were her first, and she was the youngest Australian equestrian competitor. A fund raiser was organised by Arcadia, New South Wales, residents. While her own costs and the cost of her horse were covered by Australian Paralympic Committee and Equestrian Australia, funds were required for her coach. She was placed 12th in the Individual Championship Test – Grade IV, and 11th in the Individual Freestyle Test – Grade IV and Team Test – Grade IV.

== Wheelchair basketball ==
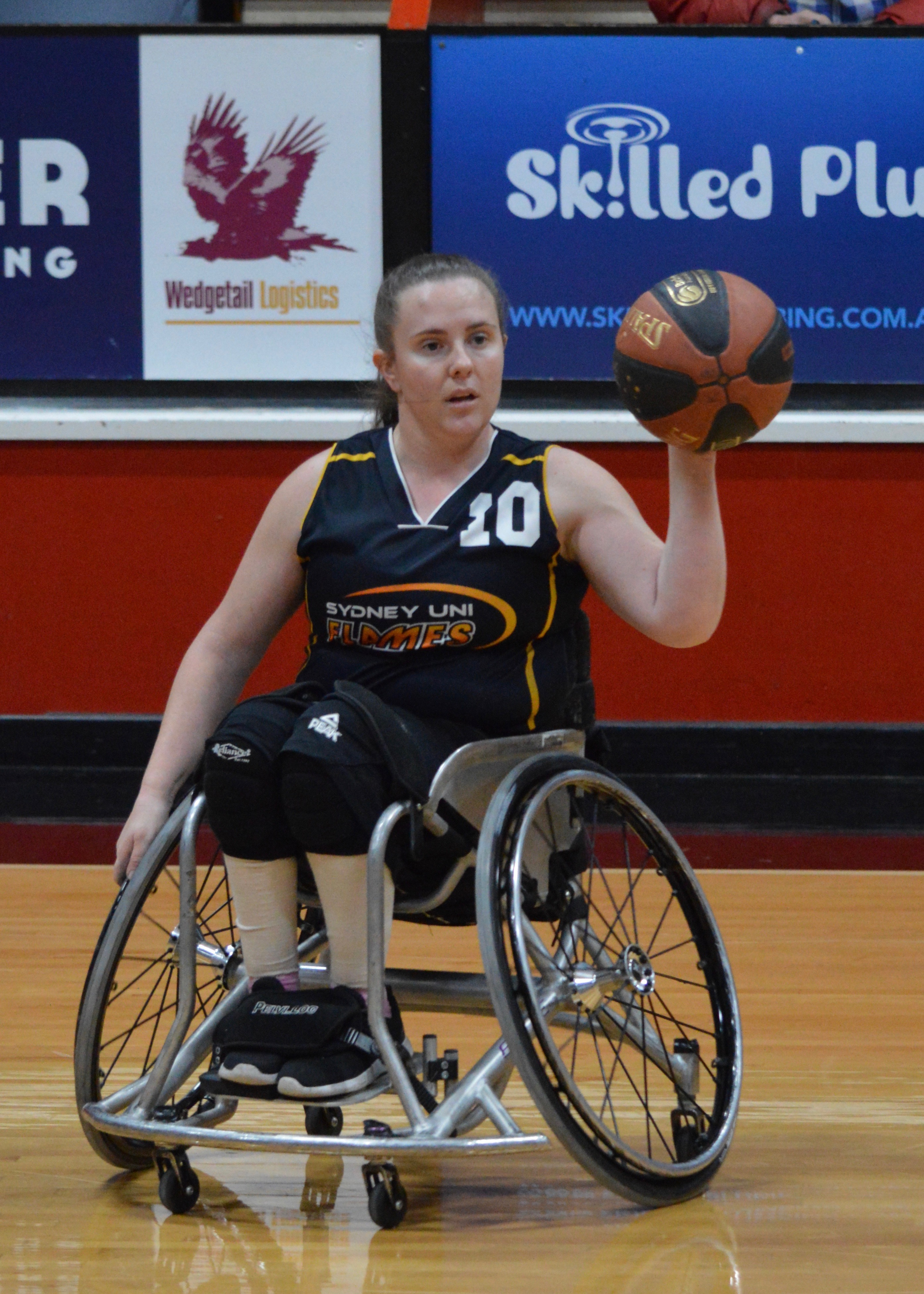
With the Sydney University Flames in 2019

After the London Paralympics, Dodd took up wheelchair basketball. She started for the Sydney University Flames in the Women's National Wheelchair Basketball League in 2013. She has to strap her fingers and wrists, and usually dislocates a shoulder during a game. "I've had a few bangs and scrapes and been tipped out of my chair a few times," she concedes, "but it's really fun. The fast pace really gives you an adrenaline kick and the girls I play with are awesome." "If I have to choose between my two sports for Rio," she said, "I will go with basketball."

Dodd made her debut with the national team, known as the Gliders, at the Osaka Cup in Osaka in February 2015. The Gliders won bronze. In June 2015, Dodd was selected as part of the under 25 team (known as the Devils) for the 2015 Women's U25 Wheelchair Basketball World Championship in Beijing in July. The Devils won silver. By this time her health had deteriorated. She had to use a wheelchair much of the time, and her classification had dropped to a 2.5 point player. In 2015, she was reclassified a 2.0, and in June 2017, as a 1.0.

Dodd represented Australia at the 2018 Wheelchair Basketball World Championship in Hamburg, where the Gliders came ninth. At the 2020 Tokyo Paralympics, the Gliders finished ninth after winning the 9th-10th classification match. She was a member of the Australian team that won the silver medal in the 3x3 Women's tournament at the 2022 Commonwealth Games in Birmingham. In June 2023, she was a member of the Gliders team at the 2022 Wheelchair Basketball World Championships in Dubai.
