= 3x3 basketball at the 2026 Commonwealth Games – Women's wheelchair tournament =

Women's 3x3 wheelchair basketball tournament at the 2026 Commonwealth Games
- Venue: SEC Centre, Glasgow
- Dates: 24 – 29 July 2026
- Competitors: 32 from 8 nations

Medalists
| gold medal | Jade Atkin; Joy Haizelden; Charlotte Moore; Lucy Robinson | England |
| silver medal | Kayli English; Robyn Love; Lea Smith; Jodie Waite | Scotland |
| bronze medal | Hannah Dodd; Georgia Munro-Cook; Taishar Ovens; Ebony Stevenson | Australia |

The women's 3x3 wheelchair basketball tournament at the 2026 Commonwealth Games was held in the SEC Centre, Glasgow between 24 and 29 July 2026. This was the second appearance of the discipline at the Games, and Canada return as defending champions. The tournament expands from six to eight teams..England won the gold medal, defeating Scotland in the final. Australia won the bronze medal.

== Qualification ==
Scotland qualified as host nation, four nations qualified by winning their respective IWBF zonal qualifiers, and the rest received Bipartite Invitations.

| Means of qualification | Quotas | Qualified |
|---|---|---|
| Host Nation | 1 | Scotland |
| IWBF Africa Qualifier | 1 | Nigeria |
| IWBF Americas Qualifier | 1 | Canada |
| IWBF Asia-Pacific | 2 | India; Australia |
| IWBF Europe Qualifier | 1 | England |
| Bipartite Invitation | 2 | Wales; South Africa |
| TOTAL | 8 | |

== Rosters ==
| CGA | Players | | | |
|---|---|---|---|---|
| Australia | Hannah Dodd | Georgia Munro-Cook | Taishar Ovens | Ebony Stevenson |
| Canada | Kady Dandeneau | Élodie Tessier | Puisand Lai | Rosie Long |
| England | Charlotte Moore | Joy Haizelden | Jade Atkin | Lucy Robinson |
| India | Reena Gupta | Ritu Irengbam | Minakshi Jadhav | Laxmi Rayannavar |
| Nigeria | Nofisat Adefala | Gbemisola Ijigbamigbe | Chituru Nwaozuzu | Titilayo Olaleye |
| Scotland | Kayli English | Robyn Love | Lea Smith | Jodie Waite |
| South Africa | Aviwe Ngoni | Michelle Moganedi | Asive Gilifile | Ongezwa Hagu |
| Wales | Anastasia Blease | Chloe Morgan | Libi Phillips | Molly Lander |

== Competition format ==
Eight teams were drawn into two groups. Upon completion of a full round robin, the top team in each group advance to the semi-finals; the teams in second and third advance to the quarter-finals, or 'play-ins'.

== Group stage ==
All times based on British Summer Time (UTC+01:00)

=== Group A ===
| Pos | Team | Pld | W | L | PF | PA | PD | Qualification |
|---|---|---|---|---|---|---|---|---|
| 1 | England | 3 | 3 | 0 | 51 | 20 | +31 | Semi-finals |
| 2 | Australia | 3 | 2 | 1 | 38 | 30 | +8 | Quarter-finals |
| 3 | Canada | 3 | 1 | 2 | 41 | 30 | +11 | Quarter-finals |
| 4 | South Africa | 3 | 0 | 3 | 10 | 60 | −50 | |

Source: Glasgow 2026
Rules for classification: 1) Wins; 2) Head-to-head record; 3) Points scored.

24 July 2026
12:05

Report

| England | 15–6 | Australia |
| Pts: Haizelden 7 | | Pts: Munro-Cook 4 |

SEC Centre, Glasgow

24 July 2026
14:30

Report

| Canada | 19–3 | South Africa |
| Pts: Tessier 10 | | Pts: three players 1 |

SEC Centre, Glasgow

26 July 2026
12:45

Report

| England | 15–12 | Canada |
| Pts: Robinson, Atkin 5 | | Pts: Dendeneau 11 |

SEC Centre, Glasgow

26 July 2026
14:25

Report

| Australia | 20–5 | South Africa |
| Pts: Munro-Cook 10 | | Pts: Gilifile 3 |

SEC Centre, Glasgow

27 July 2026
12:20

Report

| South Africa | 2–21 | England |
| Pts: Moganedi, Hagu 1 | | Pts: Robinson 8 |

SEC Centre, Glasgow

27 July 2026
14:00

Report

| Australia | 12–10 (OT) | Canada |
| Pts: Munro-Cook 8 | | Pts: Dandeneau 8 |

SEC Centre, Glasgow

=== Group B ===
| Pos | Team | Pld | W | L | PF | PA | PD | Qualification |
|---|---|---|---|---|---|---|---|---|
| 1 | Scotland | 3 | 3 | 0 | 53 | 7 | +46 | Semi-finals |
| 2 | Wales | 3 | 2 | 1 | 35 | 18 | +17 | Quarter-finals |
| 3 | Nigeria | 3 | 1 | 2 | 9 | 39 | −30 | Quarter-finals |
| 4 | India | 3 | 0 | 3 | 11 | 44 | −33 | |

Source: Glasgow 2026
Rules for classification: 1) Wins; 2) Head-to-head record; 3) Points scored.

25 July 2026
12:05

Report

| Wales | 16–1 | India |
| Pts: Blease 7 | | Pts: Gupta 1 |

SEC Centre, Glasgow

25 July 2026
16:10

Report

| Scotland | 16–1 | Nigeria |
| Pts: Love 7 | | Pts: Adefala 1 |

SEC Centre, Glasgow

26 July 2026
18:15

Report

| India | 4–21 | Scotland |
| Pts: Gupta 2 | | Pts: Smith 11 |

SEC Centre, Glasgow

26 July 2026
19:55

Report

| Nigeria | 1–17 | Wales |
| Pts: Nwaozuzu 1 | | Pts: Lander 7 |

SEC Centre, Glasgow

27 July 2026
17:50

Report

| Wales | 2–16 | Scotland |
| Pts: Lander 2 | | Pts: Smith 11 |

SEC Centre, Glasgow

27 July 2026
19:30

Report

| India | 6–7 | Nigeria |
| Pts: Jadhav 4 | | Pts: Adefala 6 |

SEC Centre, Glasgow

== Knockout stage ==
Play-ins
28 July
Australia | 19
Nigeria | 2
28 July
Wales | 3
Canada | 21

Semi-finals
29 July
Scotland | 15
Australia | 12
29 July
England | 18
Canada | 10

Gold medal match
29 July
Scotland | 10
England | 18
Bronze medal match
29 July
Australia | 19
Canada | 17

=== Play-ins ===
28 July 2026
20:30

Report

| Wales | 3–21 | Canada |
| Pts: Morgan 2 | | Pts: Dandeneau 15 |

SEC Centre, Glasgow

28 July 2026
21:00

Report

| Australia | 19–2 | Nigeria |
| Pts: Munro-Cook 8 | | Pts: Adefala, Olaleye 1 |

SEC Centre, Glasgow

=== Semi-finals ===
29 July 2026
14:30

Report

| England | 18–10 | Canada |
| Pts: Atkin 9 | | Pts: Tessier 5 |

SEC Centre, Glasgow

29 July 2026
15:00

Report

| Scotland | 15–12 | Australia |
| Pts: Love 6 | | Pts: Munro-Cook 6 |

SEC Centre, Glasgow

=== Bronze medal match ===
29 July 2026
18:00

Report

| Australia | 19–17 | Canada |
| Pts: Munro-Cook 12 | | Pts: Dandeneau 16 |

SEC Centre, Glasgow

=== Gold medal match ===
29 July 2026
19:00

Report

| Scotland | 10–18 | England |
| Pts: Smith 6 | | Pts: Atkin 7 |

SEC Centre, Glasgow

== Final ranking ==
| Rank | Team |
|---|---|
| 1st place, gold medalist(s) | England |
| 2nd place, silver medalist(s) | Scotland |
| 3rd place, bronze medalist(s) | Australia |
| 4 | Canada |
| 5 | Wales |
| 6 | Nigeria |
| 7 | India |
| 8 | South Africa |
