= 3x3 basketball at the 2026 Commonwealth Games – Women's tournament =

Women's 3x3 basketball tournament at the 2026 Commonwealth Games
- Venue: SEC, Glasgow
- Dates: 24 - 28 July 2026
- Competitors: 48 from 12 nations

Medalists
gold medal	Amy Atwell; Emma Clarke; Lara McSpadden; Marena Whittle	Australia
silver medal	Jane Asinde; Melissa Akullu; Jamila Nansikombi; Peres Nyamwenge	Uganda
bronze medal	Azure Anderson; Ella Fotu; Eva Langton; Sharne Pupuke-Robati	New Zealand

The women's 3x3 basketball tournament at the 2026 Commonwealth Games was held in SEC, Glasgow between 24 and 29 July 2026. Australia won the gold medal, defeating Uganda in the final. New Zealand won the bronze medal.

== Qualification ==
Scotland qualified as host nation and the other nations qualified by FIBA 3x3 Federation Ranking. Special arrangements were in place to ascertain the recipient of the quota place earned by Great Britain.

Means of qualification	Quotas	Qualified
Host Nation	1	Scotland
2025 Pacific Mini Games	1	Fiji
FIBA 3x3 Federation Rankings (Regional Qualification)	4	Kenya; Singapore; Cayman Islands; Australia
FIBA 3x3 Federation Rankings (Open Qualification)	5	New Zealand; Uganda; Jamaica; Papua New Guinea; Tonga
Home Nations Qualifier	1	England
TOTAL	12	

== Rosters ==
CGA	Players			
Australia	Amy Atwell	Emma Clarke	Lara McSpadden	Marena Whittle
Cayman Islands	Lyandrea Watson	Jamie Rankin-Maize	Khailan O’Connor	Courtisha Ebanks
England	Shanice Beckford-Norton	Georgia Gayle	Cheridene Green	Katie Januszewska
Fiji	Estelle Kainamoli	Moana Liebregts	Ranadi Koroi	Bulou Tuisue
Jamaica	Tiffany Reynolds	Carissa Robinson	Christeina Bryan	Teneisia Brown
Kenya	Babra Achieng	Esther Minayo	Yvone Okello	Mary Omondi
New Zealand	Azure Anderson	Ella Fotu	Eva Langton	Sharne Pupuke-Robati
Papua New Guinea	Jackie Asiba	Normalisa Dobunaba	Philomena Isei	Nauna Lelai
Scotland	Claire Paxton	Hannah Robb	Kirsty Brown	Ella Doherty
Singapore	Lydia Ang	Han Xingyue	Matilda Lai	Jermaine Lim
Tonga	Finau Kalolaine Tonga	Lesila Kefu Finau	Mele Katokakala Finau	Olivia Maumi Po'uliva'ati
Uganda	Jane Asinde	Melissa Akullu	Jamila Nansikombi	Peres Nyamwenge

== Competition format ==
Twelve teams are drawn into two groups, each of which plays a complete round-robin. Upon completion of the group stage, the top-ranked teams in each group advances to the directly to the semi-finals; the second and third placed placed teams in each group progress to the semi-final 'play-ins'.

== Group stage ==
All times based on British Summer Time (UTC+01:00)

=== Group A ===
Pos	Team	Pld	W	L	PF	PA	PD	Qualification
1	Australia	5	5	0	105	33	+72	Direct to semi-finals
2	Uganda	5	4	1	90	58	+32	Quarter-finals
3	Jamaica	5	3	2	89	75	+14	Quarter-finals
4	Kenya	5	2	3	63	85	−22	
5	Fiji	5	1	4	56	81	−25	
6	Cayman Islands	5	0	5	29	100	−71	

Source: Glasgow 2026
Rules for classification: 1) Wins; 2) Head-to-head record; 3) Points scored.

24 July 2026
10:25

Report

Australia	21–5	Kenya
Pts: Clarke 9		Pts: Minayo 2

SEC, Glasgow

24 July 2026
11:15

Report

Fiji	16–6	Cayman Islands
Pts: Tuisue 7		Pts: O'Connor 4

SEC, Glasgow

24 July 2026
12:55

Report

Uganda	18–17 (OT)	Jamaica
Pts: Asinde 7		Pts: Brown 6

SEC, Glasgow

24 July 2026
14:30

Report

Australia	21–13	Jamaica
Pts: Atwell 8		Pts: Reynolds 8

SEC, Glasgow

24 July 2026
15:20

Report

Uganda	21–7	Cayman Islands
Pts: Akullu 10		Pts: O'Connor 6

SEC, Glasgow

24 July 2026
17:00

Report

Kenya	16–14 (OT)	Fiji
Pts: Omondi 6		Pts: Kainamoli 6

SEC, Glasgow

24 July 2026
19:25

Report

Cayman Islands	5–21	Jamaica
Pts: O'Connor 3		Pts: Brown 8

SEC, Glasgow

24 July 2026
20:15

Report

Uganda	21–5	Kenya
Pts: Asinde 10		Pts: Omondi 3

SEC, Glasgow

24 July 2026
21:05

Report

Australia	21–3	Fiji
Pts: Clarke 10		Pts: Koroi 2

SEC, Glasgow

26 July 2026
11:55

Report

Australia	21–3	Cayman Islands
Pts: Atwell 11		Pts: O'Connor 2

SEC, Glasgow

26 July 2026
13:35

Report

Uganda	21–8	Fiji
Pts: three players 7		Pts: Tuisue 5

SEC, Glasgow

26 July 2026
15:15

Report

Kenya	16–21	Jamaica
Pts: Omondi 7		Pts: Reynolds 13

SEC, Glasgow

26 July 2026
17:25

Report

Fiji	15–17	Jamaica
Pts: Kainamoli 7		Pts: Bryan 7

SEC, Glasgow

26 July 2026
19:05

Report

Kenya	22–8	Cayman Islands
Pts: Minayo, Omondi 7		Pts: Watson 3

SEC, Glasgow

26 July 2026
20:45

Report

Australia	21–9	Uganda
Pts: Atwell 11		Pts: Akullu 4

SEC, Glasgow

=== Group B ===
Pos	Team	Pld	W	L	PF	PA	PD	Qualification
1	New Zealand	5	5	0	105	54	+51	Direct to semi-finals
2	England	5	4	1	89	45	+44	Quarter-finals
3	Tonga	5	3	2	50	72	−22	Quarter-finals
4	Scotland (H)	5	2	3	73	67	+6	
5	Singapore	5	1	4	69	85	−16	
6	Papua New Guinea	5	0	5	33	96	−63	

Source: Glasgow 2026
Rules for classification: 1) Wins; 2) Head-to-head record; 3) Points scored.
(H) Hosts

25 July 2026
10:00

Report

Singapore	7–22	England
Pts: Lim 5		Pts: Beckford-Norton 9

SEC, Glasgow

25 July 2026
10:00

Report

Scotland	10–12	Tonga
Pts: Brown 7		Pts: L Finau, M Finau 5

SEC, Glasgow

25 July 2026
10:00

Report

New Zealand	22–6	Papua New Guinea
Pts: Pupuke-Robati 10		Pts: Dobunaba 3

SEC, Glasgow

25 July 2026
14:30

Report

Singapore	21–8	Papua New Guinea
Pts: Ang, Lai 8		Pts: Asiba 5

SEC, Glasgow

25 July 2026
15:20

Report

New Zealand	21–8	Tonga
Pts: Pupuke-Robati 10		Pts: L Finau 5

SEC, Glasgow

25 July 2026
17:00

Report

England	14–9	Scotland
Pts: Green 7		Pts: Robb, Doherty 3

SEC, Glasgow

25 July 2026
19:25

Report

Singapore	15–21	Scotland
Pts: Han 8		Pts: Brown 8

SEC, Glasgow

25 July 2026
20:15

Report

Tonga	12–10	Papua New Guinea
Pts: M Finau 4		Pts: Asiba 6

SEC, Glasgow

25 July 2026
21:15

Report

New Zealand	21–12	England
Pts: Pupuke-Robati 11		Pts: Gayle 5

SEC, Glasgow

27 July 2026
11:30

Report

Singapore	10–14	Tonga
Pts: Lai 4		Pts: L Finau 6

SEC, Glasgow

27 July 2026
13:10

Report

New Zealand	21–12	Scotland
Pts: Fotu 8		Pts: Brown 7

SEC, Glasgow

27 July 2026
14:50

Report

England	21–4	Papua New Guinea
Pts: Gayle 9		Pts: Asiba 3

SEC, Glasgow

27 July 2026
17:00

Report

Scotland	21–5	Papua New Guinea
Pts: Doherty 8		Pts: Dobunaba 4

SEC, Glasgow

27 July 2026
18:40

Report

England	21–4	Tonga
Pts: Januszewska 8		Pts: M Finau 3

SEC, Glasgow

27 July 2026
20:20

Report

Singapore	16–22	New Zealand
Pts: Lim 8		Pts: Pupuke-Robati 10

SEC, Glasgow

== Knockout stage ==
Play-ins
28 July
Uganda	21
Tonga	12
28 July
England	20
Jamaica	21

Semi-finals
29 July
New Zealand	9
Uganda	21
29 July
Australia	21
Jamaica	8

Gold medal match
29 July
Uganda	11
Australia	21
Bronze medal match
29 July
New Zealand	18
Jamaica	13

=== Play-ins ===
28 July 2026
19:30

Report

Uganda	21–12	Tonga
Pts: Asinde 10		Pts: three players 4

SEC, Glasgow

28 July 2026
20:00

Report

England	20–21	Jamaica
Pts: Beckford-Norton 9		Pts: Reynolds 7

SEC, Glasgow

=== Semi-finals ===
29 July 2026
13:30

Report

Australia	21–8	Jamaica
Pts: Atwell 13		Pts: Reynolds, Brown 3

SEC, Glasgow

29 July 2026
14:00

Report

New Zealand	9–21	Uganda
Pts: Pupuke-Robati 5		Pts: Akullu, Asinde 8

SEC, Glasgow

=== Bronze medal match ===
29 July 2026
17:00

Report

New Zealand	18–13	Jamaica
Pts: Pupuke-Robati 8		Pts: Reynolds 7

SEC, Glasgow

=== Gold medal match ===
29 July 2026
20:00

Report

Uganda	11–21	Australia
Pts: Akullu 7		Pts: Whittle 15

SEC, Glasgow

== Final ranking ==
Rank	Team
1st place, gold medalist(s)	Australia
2nd place, silver medalist(s)	Uganda
3rd place, bronze medalist(s)	New Zealand
4	Jamaica
5	England
6	Tonga
7	Scotland
8	Kenya
9	Singapore
10	Fiji
11	Papua New Guinea
12	Cayman Islands
