= Basketball at the Commonwealth Games =

Basketball at the Commonwealth Games has been held three times, with regular full-court basketball included in 2006 and 2018, and 3x3 introduced in 2022.

Following the 2018 games, regular full-court basketball was replaced as an optional Commonwealth Games sport by the 3x3 variation of the sport. This made its debut at the 2022 Commonwealth Games, with both able-bodied and wheelchair competitions taking place.

== History ==
In 1978, Britain hosted the Commonwealth Basketball Championships. The same tournament was held five years later in New Zealand.

Basketball was first included in the Commonwealth Games in the 2006 games in Melbourne. Australia won gold medals in both the men's and women's competitions. New Zealand's teams and England's teams won the silver and bronze medals respectively.

Basketball was not included in the 2010 Commonwealth Games in Delhi, but India was scheduled to host a Commonwealth Basketball Championship tournament prior to the games. It was later cancelled by FIBA.

Basketball returned as part of the 2018 Commonwealth Games on the Gold Coast. A total of 16 teams (8 men and 8 women) competed in 2018.

In August 2017, it was announced that 3x3 basketball would be part of the 2022 Commonwealth Games in Birmingham.

== Venues ==
- (Australia) Melbourne 2006: Ballarat Minerdome, Bendigo Stadium, Geelong Arena, Traralgon Sports Stadium and Melbourne Park Multi-Purpose Venue, Victoria
- (Australia) Gold Coast 2018: Cairns Convention Centre, Townsville Entertainment and Convention Centre and Gold Coast Convention and Exhibition Centre, Queensland
- (England) Birmingham 2022: Smithfield, West Midlands

== Men's tournaments ==
Year	Host	Gold medal game			Bronze medal game
Year	Host	Gold medalist	Score	Silver medalist	Bronze medalist	Score	Fourth place
2006; Details	Melbourne, Australia	Australia	81-76	New Zealand	England	80-57	Nigeria
2018; Details	Gold Coast, Australia	Australia	87-47	Canada	New Zealand	79-69	Scotland

=== Performance by nations ===
Nation	2006	2018	Years
Australia	1st	1st	2
Barbados	5th	-	1
Cameroon	-	7th	1
Canada	-	2nd	1
England	3rd	6th	2
India	8th	8th	2
New Zealand	2nd	3rd	2
Nigeria	4th	5th	2
Scotland	6th	4th	2
South Africa	7th	-	1
Nations	8	8	10

== Women's tournaments ==
Year	Host	Gold medal game			Bronze medal game
Year	Host	Gold medalist	Score	Silver medalist	Bronze medalist	Score	Fourth place
2006; Details	Melbourne, Australia	Australia	77-39	New Zealand	England	78-75	Nigeria
2018; Details	Gold Coast, Australia	Australia	99-55	England	New Zealand	74-58	Canada

=== Performance by nations ===
Nation	2006	2018	Years
Australia	1st	1st	2
Canada	-	4th	1
England	3rd	2nd	2
India	8th	8th	2
Jamaica	-	5th	1
Malaysia	7th	7th	2
Malta	6th	-	1
Mozambique	5th	6th	2
New Zealand	2nd	3rd	2
Nigeria	4th	-	1
Nations	8	8	10

== 3x3 tournaments ==
=== Men's tournaments ===
Year	Host	Gold medal game			Bronze medal game
Year	Host	Gold medalist	Score	Silver medalist	Bronze medalist	Score	Fourth place
2022; Details	Birmingham, England	England	17-16	Australia	Canada	13-12	Scotland
2026; Details	Glasgow, Scotland	England	19-17	Australia	Scotland	18-16	New Zealand

=== Women's tournaments ===
Year	Host	Gold medal game			Bronze medal game
Year	Host	Gold medalist	Score	Silver medalist	Bronze medalist	Score	Fourth place
2022; Details	Birmingham, England	Canada	14-13	England	Australia	15-13	New Zealand
2026; Details	Glasgow, Scotland	Australia	21-11	Uganda	New Zealand	18-13	Jamaica

=== Men's Wheelchair tournaments ===
Year	Host	Gold medal game			Bronze medal game
Year	Host	Gold medalist	Score	Silver medalist	Bronze medalist	Score	Fourth place
2022; Details	Birmingham, England	Australia	11-9	Canada	England	21-11	Malaysia
2026; Details	Glasgow, Scotland	Australia	19-13	England	Canada	19-9	Scotland

=== Women's Wheelchair tournaments ===
Year	Host	Gold medal game			Bronze medal game
Year	Host	Gold medalist	Score	Silver medalist	Bronze medalist	Score	Fourth place
2022; Details	Birmingham, England	Canada	14-5	Australia	England	12-10	Scotland
2026; Details	Glasgow, Scotland	England	18-10	Scotland	Australia	19-17	Canada

== All-time medal table ==
Updated after the 2026 Commonwealth Games

Rank	Nation	Gold	Silver	Bronze	Total
1	Australia	7	3	2	12
2	England	3	3	4	10
3	Canada	2	2	2	6
4	New Zealand	0	2	3	5
5	Scotland	0	1	1	2
6	Uganda	0	1	0	1
Totals (6 entries)		12	12	12	36
