= List of 2026 Commonwealth Games medal winners =

The programme of the 2026 Commonwealth Games featured 215 events in 10 sports, with six of those sports also including para sport events.

== 3x3 basketball and Wheelchair 3x3 basketball ==
=== Medal table ===
* Host nation (Scotland)

Rank	Nation	Gold	Silver	Bronze	Total
1	Australia	2	1	1	4
2	England	2	1	0	3
3	Scotland*	0	1	1	2
4	Uganda	0	1	0	1
5	Canada	0	0	1	1
5	New Zealand	0	0	1	1
Totals (6 entries)		4	4	4	12

=== Medallists ===
Event	Gold	Silver	Bronze
Men	England; Jamell Anderson; Ashley Hamilton; Dwayne Lautier-Ogunleye; Evan Walshe	Australia; Jonah Antonio; Jarred Bairstow; Samuel McDaniel; Jesse Wagstaff	Scotland; Kyle Jimenez; Fraser Malcolm; Owen McCormack; Skyler White
Women	Australia; Amy Atwell; Emma Clarke; Lara McSpadden; Marena Whittle	Uganda; Jane Asinde; Melissa Akullu; Jamila Nansikombi; Peres Nyamwenge	New Zealand; Azure Anderson; Ella Fotu; Eva Langton; Sharne Pupuke-Robati
Wheelchair men	Australia; Tomas Klein; Eithen Leard; Tom O'Neill-Thorne; Luke Pople	England; James Hazell; Tom Harvey; Oscar Knight; Peter Cusack	Canada; Garrett Ostepchuk; Lee Melymick; Kyrell Sopotyk; Reed De’Aeth
Wheelchair women	England; Charlotte Moore; Joy Haizelden; Jade Atkin; Lucy Robinson	Scotland; Kayli English; Robyn Love; Lea Smith; Jodie Waite	Australia; Hannah Dodd; Georgia Munro-Cook; Taishar Ovens; Ebony Stevenson

== Artistic gymnastics ==
=== Medal table ===
* Host nation (Scotland)

Rank	CGA	Gold	Silver	Bronze	Total
1	Canada	7	5	4	16
2	Australia	4	1	4	9
3	England	1	4	2	7
4	Scotland*	1	1	1	3
5	Wales	1	0	2	3
6	Cyprus	0	2	1	3
7	Singapore	0	1	0	1
Totals (7 entries)		14	14	14	42

=== Men's events ===
Event	Gold	Silver	Bronze
Team all-around	Canada; Jordan Carroll; René Cournoyer; Félix Dolci; William Émard; Ethan Ikeda	England; Gabriel Langton; Joshua Nathan; Adam Tobin; Luke Whitehouse; Alexander Yolshin-Cash	Australia; Benjamin Foster; Tru Hagens; James Hardy; Ritam Malik; Jesse Moore
Individual all-around	Reuben Ward; Scotland	Félix Dolci; Canada	Jesse Moore; Australia
Floor exercise	Luke Whitehouse; England	René Cournoyer; Canada	James Hardy; Australia
Pommel horse	Jordan Carroll; Canada	Reuben Ward; Scotland	Cameron Lynn; Scotland
Rings	Félix Dolci; Canada	William Émard; Canada	James Hardy; Australia
Vault	Félix Dolci; Canada	Luke Whitehouse; England	Neofytos Kyriakou; Cyprus
Parallel bars	Jesse Moore; Australia	Marios Georgiou; Cyprus	Félix Dolci; Canada
Horizontal bar	Félix Dolci; Canada	Marios Georgiou; Cyprus	William Émard; Canada

=== Women's events ===
Event	Gold	Silver	Bronze
Team all-around	Australia; Georgia Godwin; Kate McDonald; Ruby Pass; Breanna Scott; Emily Whitehead	Canada; Ellie Black; Gabrielle Black; Lia Monica Fontaine; Alyssa Guerrier-Calixte; Lia Redick	England; Shantae-Eve Amankwaah; Shanna-Kae Grant; Alia Leat; Abigail Martin; Ruby Stacey
Individual all-around	Ellie Black; Canada	Breanna Scott; Australia	Lia Monica Fontaine; Canada
Vault	Lia Monica Fontaine; Canada	Abigail Martin; England	Abigail Roper; Wales
Uneven bars	Kate McDonald; Australia	Ellie Black; Canada	Emily Roper; Wales
Balance beam	Breanna Scott; Australia	Amanda Yap; Singapore	Lia Monica Fontaine; Canada
Floor exercise	Ruby Evans; Wales	Abigail Martin; England	Shantae-Eve Amankwaah; England

== Athletics and Para athletics ==
=== Medal table ===
* Host nation (Scotland)

Rank	CGA	Gold	Silver	Bronze	Total
1	Australia	12	11	11	34
2	Jamaica	10	3	5	18
3	England	6	9	6	21
4	Canada	4	7	5	16
5	Nigeria	4	3	6	13
6	Scotland*	4	0	3	7
7	India	3	7	6	16
8	Kenya	3	4	4	11
9	New Zealand	2	3	2	7
10	Wales	2	2	1	5
11	South Africa	1	2	1	4
12	Sri Lanka	1	1	0	2
13	Cameroon	1	0	1	2
13	Malaysia	1	0	1	2
15	Bahamas	1	0	0	1
15	British Virgin Islands	1	0	0	1
15	Dominica	1	0	0	1
15	Grenada	1	0	0	1
15	Northern Ireland	1	0	0	1
20	Trinidad and Tobago	0	2	2	4
21	Mauritius	0	2	0	2
22	Cyprus	0	1	1	2
23	Barbados	0	1	0	1
23	Ghana	0	1	0	1
25	Bermuda	0	0	1	1
25	Isle of Man	0	0	1	1
25	Rwanda	0	0	1	1
25	Uganda	0	0	1	1
Totals (28 entries)		59	59	59	177

=== Men ===
Event	Gold		Silver		Bronze	
100 metres	Emmanuel Eseme; Cameroon	9.83 GR, NR	Lachlan Kennedy; Australia	9.85 AR	Kayinsola Ajayi; Nigeria	9.90
200 metres	Sinesipho Dambile; South Africa	19.96	Udodi Onwuzurike; Nigeria	20.09 SB	Christopher Taylor; Jamaica	20.11 PB
400 metres	Samuel Ogazi; Nigeria	44.25	Jereem Richards; Trinidad and Tobago	44.82	Zakithi Nene; South Africa	45.21
800 metres	Navasky Anderson; Jamaica	1:45.33	Luke Boyes; Australia	1:45.93	Wyclife Kinyamal; Kenya	1:46.12
Mile	Josh Kerr; Scotland	3:54.12	Cameron Myers; Australia	3:55.26	Timothy Cheruiyot; Kenya	3:55.41
5000 metres	Mathew Kipsang; Kenya	13:23.61	Ky Robinson; Australia	13:24.70	Gulveer Singh; India	13:24.95
10,000 metres	Ky Robinson; Australia	27:48.93	Gulveer Singh; India	27:49.78	David Mullarkey; Isle of Man	27:50.28
110 metres hurdles	Demario Prince; Jamaica	13.17	Samuel Bennett; England	13.30 PB	Milan Trajkovic; Cyprus	13.32 SB
400 metres hurdles	Ezekiel Nathaniel; Nigeria	48.47	Jake Minshull; England	48.99	Assinie Wilson; Jamaica	49.22
3000 metres steeplechase	Edmund Serem; Kenya	8:18.23	Simon Kiprop Koech; Kenya	8:18.59	Leonard Kipkemoi Bett; Kenya	8:21.63
4 × 100 metres relay	Australia; Lachlan Kennedy; Joshua Azzopardi; Calab Law; Rohan Browning; Christopher Ius*	38.07	Canada; Aaron Brown; Jerome Blake; Brendon Rodney; Andre De Grasse; Duan Asemota*	38.11	Nigeria; Favour Ashe; Kayinsola Ajayi; Adekalu Fakorede; Udodi Onwuzurike; Chidera Ezeakor*	38.12 SB
10,000 metres walk	Isaac Beacroft; Australia	38:45.51 SB	Stephen Ndangiri Kihu; Kenya	38:46.57 PB	Evan Dunfee; Canada	40:03.39
High jump	Romaine Beckford; Jamaica	2.25 m	Sarvesh Kushare; India	2.25 m	Kimani Jack; England	2.20 m
Pole vault	Kurtis Marschall; Australia	5.85 m GR	Kyle Rademeyer; South Africa	5.70 m	Owen Heard; England	5.70 m
Long jump	Tajay Gayle; Jamaica	8.15 m	Murali Sreeshankar; India	8.09 m	Stephen Mackenzie; Scotland	8.08 m
Triple jump	Jordan Scott; Jamaica	16.72 m	Praveen Chithravel; India	16.58 m	Selva Prabhu; India	16.52 m
Shot put	Chukwuebuka Enekwechi; Nigeria	21.07 m	Tom Walsh; New Zealand	21.03 m	Scott Lincoln; England	20.99 m
Discus throw	Matthew Denny; Australia	67.73 m	Fedrick Dacres; Jamaica	65.10 m	Lawrence Okoye; England	64.45 m
Hammer throw	Ethan Katzberg; Canada	80.97 m GR	Iosif Kesidis; Cyprus	76.97 m	Rowan Hamilton; Canada	75.36 m
Javelin throw	Rumesh Tharanga; Sri Lanka	89.75 m	Neeraj Chopra; India	85.83 m	Yashvir Singh; India	85.41 m
Decathlon	Lindon Victor; Grenada	8096 pts SB	Damian Warner; Canada	8036 pts	Tejaswin Shankar; India	7976 pts

=== Women ===
Event	Gold		Silver		Bronze	
100 metres	Zoe Hobbs; New Zealand	10.93 AR	Amy Hunt; England	10.98	Torrie Lewis; Australia	10.99 NR
200 metres	Adaejah Hodge; British Virgin Islands	22.07	Shaniqua Bascombe; Trinidad and Tobago	22.35	Alana Reid; Jamaica	22.56
400 metres	Dejanea Oakley; Jamaica	50.21	Sada Williams; Barbados	50.99	Ella Onojuvwevwo; Nigeria	51.00
800 metres	Georgia Hunter Bell; England	1:59.51	Lilian Odira; Kenya	2:00.58	Sarah Billings; Australia	2:00.61
Mile	Abbey Caldwell; Australia	4:39.31	Jessica Hull; Australia	4:39.86	Claudia Hollingsworth; Australia	4:40.20
5000 metres	Rose Davies; Australia	14:44.53 SB	Jessica Hull; Australia	14:45.01 SB	Megan Keith; Scotland	14:49.10 SB
10,000 metres	Rose Davies; Australia	31:39.32 SB	Diana Wanza; Kenya	31:50.13	Florence Niyonkuru; Rwanda	31:55.47
100 metres hurdles	Devynne Charlton; Bahamas	12.33	Megan Simmonds; Jamaica	12.41	Tobi Amusan; Nigeria	12.60
400 metres hurdles	Sanique Walker; Jamaica	54.00 PB	Emily Newnham; England	54.04	Savannah Sutherland; Canada	54.16 SB
3000 metres steeplechase	Faith Cherotich; Kenya	9:01.76 GR	Elise Thorner; England	9:05.45 PB	Peruth Chemutai; Uganda	9:09.96
4 × 100 metres relay	Jamaica; Alana Reid; Jodean Williams; Lavanya Williams; Ashanti Moore	42.65	Canada; Sade McCreath; Marie-Éloïse Leclair; Frédérique Chiasson; Audrey Leduc	42.76	Trinidad and Tobago; Michelle-Lee Ahye; Shaniqua Bascombe; Leah Bertrand; Reese Webster	43.07 SB
10,000 metres walk	Jemima Montag; Australia	42:13.40 PB	Elizabeth McMillen; Australia	42:39.87 SB	Rebecca Henderson; Australia	43:27.46
High jump	Eleanor Patterson; Australia	1.96 m =GR	Nicola Olyslagers; Australia	1.93 m	Temitope Adeshina; Nigeria	1.90 m
Pole vault	Eliza McCartney; New Zealand	4.65 m	Nina Kennedy; Australia	4.65 m	Imogen Ayris; New Zealand	4.55 m
Long jump	Jazmin Sawyers; England	6.93 m	Ruth Usoro; Nigeria	6.87 m	Brooke Buschkuehl; Australia	6.80 m
Triple jump	Thea LaFond; Dominica	14.60 m	Ackelia Smith; Jamaica	14.04 m	Shantae Foreman; Jamaica	13.96 m
Shot put	Sarah Mitton; Canada	19.88 m	Jessica Oji; Nigeria	17.87 m	Lloydricia Cameron; Jamaica	17.87 m
Discus throw	Samantha Hall; Jamaica	61.66 m	Julia Tunks; Canada	60.67 m	Seema Kaliramna; India	58.65 m
Hammer throw	Camryn Rogers; Canada	74.91 m GR	Lauren Bruce; New Zealand	69.82 m	Lara Roberts; Australia	68.05 m
Javelin throw	Mackenzie Little; Australia	61.88 m SB	Tori Moorby; New Zealand	60.04 m	Irene Jepkemboi; Kenya	57.85 m
Heptathlon	Kate O'Connor; Northern Ireland	6569 pts	Jade O'Dowda; England	6278 pts	Tori West; Australia	6104 pts

=== Mixed ===
Event	Gold		Silver		Bronze	
4 × 400 metres relay	Jamaica; Zandrion Barnes; Leah Anderson; Delano Kennedy; Dejanea Oakley; Shana Kaye Anderson*; Christopher Taylor*	3:10.97	England; Ben Jeffries; Yemi Mary John; Toby Harries; Lina Nielsen; Poppy Malik*; Laviai Nielsen*	3:11.58	Nigeria; Ezekiel Nathaniel; Patience Okon George; Samuel Ogazi; Ella Onojuvwevwo; Udo Edidiong*; Esther Joseph*	3:12.85 SB

=== Para-athletics ===
Men

Event	Gold		Silver		Bronze	
100 metres (T12)	Zachary Shaw; England	10.89	Masala Makatu; South Africa	11.04	George Quarcoo; Canada	11.06
100 metres (T38)	Thomas Young; England	11.11 GR, SB	Ullrich Muller; Australia	11.19 SB	Zachary Gingras; Canada	11.55 PB
100 metres (T47)	Dilip Gavit; India	10.71 GR, SB	Mohammed Basil; India	10.83 SB	Kevin Santos; England	10.85 SB
1500 metres (T20)	Ben Sandilands; Scotland	3:57.25 SB	Michael Barber; Canada	4:01.84	Steven Bryce; Scotland	4:02.40 SB
1500 metres (T54)	Nathan Maguire; England	3:17.65 SB	Daniel Sidbury; England	3:18.31 SB	Sam Rizzo; Australia	3:18.61 SB
Long jump (T20)	Abdul Latif Romly; Malaysia	7.17 m SB	Noah Vucsics; Canada	6.66 m SB	Eljoe Gotuoh; Malaysia	6.51 m SB
Shot put (F57)	Soman Rana; India	13.40 m SB	Shubham Juyal; India	13.28 m SB	Cedric Lekezo Azamdzi; Cameroon	12.57 m SB
Discus throw (F44)	Aled Davies; Wales	48.38 m	Palitha Halgahawela; Sri Lanka	46.84 m PB	Akeem Stewart; Trinidad and Tobago	56.82 m SB

Women

Event	Gold		Silver		Bronze	
100 metres (T38)	Sophie Hahn; England	12.79	Olivia Breen; Wales	12.86 SB	Maddie Down; England	12.86 PB
100 metres (T47)	Sheriauna Haase; Canada	12.23 PB	Chloe Dunbar; Canada	12.33 PB	Anna Grimaldi; New Zealand	12.46 SB
200 metres (T38)	Rhiannon Clarke; Australia	26.92 SB	Sophie Hahn; England	27.53	Briseis Brittain; Australia	27.66
400 metres (T54)	Melanie Woods; Scotland	56.43 SB	Noemi Alphonse; Mauritius	57.89 SB	Jessica Cooper Lewis; Bermuda	59.31
1500 metres (T54)	Melanie Woods; Scotland	3:32.20 GR, SB	Noemi Alphonse; Mauritius	3:32.98 SB	Eliza Ault-Connell; Australia	3:40.84 SB
Long jump (T38)	Olivia Breen; Wales	5.09 m	Layla Sharp; Australia	5.06 m GR, AR	Ayla Kowalczyk; Australia	4.71 m
Shot put (F57)	Sharmila Dhankar; India	9.81 SB	Zinabu Issah; Ghana	8.65 SB	Shilpa Shyla; India	7.26 PB
Discus throw (F44)	Goodness Nwachukwu; Nigeria	39.66 WR	Funmi Oduwaiye; Wales	38.52 SB	Bree Cronin; Wales	36.00 SB

== Bowls ==
=== Medal table ===
* Host nation (Scotland)

Rank	Nation	Gold	Silver	Bronze	Total
1	England	3	2	1	6
2	Australia	2	0	0	2
3	Northern Ireland	1	0	2	3
4	Scotland*	1	0	0	1
5	Malaysia	0	2	2	4
6	New Zealand	0	2	0	2
7	Guernsey	0	1	0	1
8	Norfolk Island	0	0	1	1
8	Wales	0	0	1	1
Totals (9 entries)		7	7	7	21

=== Medallists ===
Event	Gold	Silver	Bronze
Men's singles	Sam Tolchard; England	Izzat Dzulkeple; Malaysia	Gary Kelly; Northern Ireland
Men's pairs	Gary Kelly; Adam McKeown; Northern Ireland	Nick Brett; Jamie Walker; England	Soufi Rusli; Amirul D Rahim; Malaysia
Women's singles	Katherine Rednall; England	Alison Merrien; Guernsey	Shae Wilson; Norfolk Island
Women's pairs	Amy Pharaoh; Sian Honnor; England	Syafiqa Haidar; Aleena Nawawi; Malaysia	Chloe Wilson; Shauna O'Neill; Northern Ireland

==== Para ====
Event	Gold	Silver	Bronze
Men's pairs B6–8	Damien Delgado; James Reynolds; Australia	Kurt Smith; Mark Noble; New Zealand	Joe Peplow; Kieran Rollings; England
Women's pairs B6–8	Louise Hoskins; Serena Bonnell; Australia	Julie O'Connell; Teri Blacbourn; New Zealand	Norazian Daud; Jariah Zakaria; Malaysia
Mixed pairs B2–3	Mary Stevenson; James Aitken; Robert Barr; Sarah-Jane Ewing; Scotland	Ron Homer; Sue Davies; Sally-Ann Lewis-Wall; Elizabeth Shipley; England	Julie Thomas; Jamie Jones; Steffan James; John Wilson; Wales

== Boxing ==
* Host nation (Scotland)

Rank	CGA	Gold	Silver	Bronze	Total
1	India	7	3	0	10
2	England	4	3	3	10
3	Australia	2	1	3	6
4	Northern Ireland	1	2	3	6
5	Canada	0	2	2	4
5	Wales	0	2	2	4
7	Namibia	0	1	2	3
8	Scotland*	0	0	3	3
9	Lesotho	0	0	2	2
9	Zambia	0	0	2	2
11	Fiji	0	0	1	1
11	Ghana	0	0	1	1
11	Mauritius	0	0	1	1
11	Pakistan	0	0	1	1
11	Trinidad and Tobago	0	0	1	1
11	Tuvalu	0	0	1	1
Totals (16 entries)		14	14	28	56

=== Men ===
Event	Gold	Silver	Bronze
55 kg	Jye Dixon; Australia	Jadumani Singh; India	Amadu Mohammed; Ghana
55 kg	Jye Dixon; Australia	Jadumani Singh; India	Philip Haoseb; Namibia
60 kg	Sachin Siwach; India	Tryagain Ndevelo; Namibia	Owain Harris-Allan; Wales
60 kg	Sachin Siwach; India	Tryagain Ndevelo; Namibia	Jude Gallagher; Northern Ireland
65 kg	Patris Mughalzai; England	Jacob Cassar; Australia	Pooana Khoahli; Lesotho
65 kg	Patris Mughalzai; England	Jacob Cassar; Australia	Emmanuel Katema; Zambia
70 kg	Jon McConnell; Northern Ireland	Orlando Holley-Sotomi; Wales	Merven Clair; Mauritius
70 kg	Jon McConnell; Northern Ireland	Orlando Holley-Sotomi; Wales	Sonny Kerr; Scotland
80 kg	Ankush Panghal; India	Dimeji Shittu; England	Joshua Ofori; Canada
80 kg	Ankush Panghal; India	Dimeji Shittu; England	Paul Trainor; Australia
90 kg	Isaac Okoh; England	Connor Williams; Wales	Garyn McAllister; Northern Ireland
90 kg	Isaac Okoh; England	Connor Williams; Wales	Robert McNulty; Scotland
+90 kg	Damar Thomas; England	Narender Berwal; India	Willie John McCartan; Northern Ireland
+90 kg	Damar Thomas; England	Narender Berwal; India	Nigel Paul; Trinidad and Tobago

=== Women ===
Event	Gold	Silver	Bronze
51 kg	Sakshi Chaudhary; India	Ruby White; England	Amber-Jane Wall; Canada
51 kg	Sakshi Chaudhary; India	Ruby White; England	Mischa Aeres; Namibia
54 kg	Preeti Pawar; India	Scarlett Delgado; Canada	Lauren Mackie; England
54 kg	Preeti Pawar; India	Scarlett Delgado; Canada	Catherine Mwape; Zambia
57 kg	Jaismine Lamboria; India	Michaela Walsh; Northern Ireland	Jasmine Daunakamakama; Fiji
57 kg	Jaismine Lamboria; India	Michaela Walsh; Northern Ireland	Rapelang Maselele; Lesotho
60 kg	Priya Ghanghas; India	Marie Al-Ahmadieh; Canada	Fatima Zahra; Pakistan
60 kg	Priya Ghanghas; India	Marie Al-Ahmadieh; Canada	Lucy Kings-Wheatley; England
65 kg	Sacha Hickey; England	Kaci Rock; Northern Ireland	Caitlin Rainey; Scotland
65 kg	Sacha Hickey; England	Kaci Rock; Northern Ireland	Eve Bryson; Australia
70 kg	Arundhati Choudhary; India	Chantelle Reid; England	Rosie Eccles; Wales
70 kg	Arundhati Choudhary; India	Chantelle Reid; England	Lekeisha Pergoliti; Australia
75 kg	Emma-Sue Greentree; Australia	Lovlina Borgohain; India	Mary Kate Smith; England
75 kg	Emma-Sue Greentree; Australia	Lovlina Borgohain; India	Tarona Taafaki; Tuvalu

== Judo ==
=== Medal table ===
* Host nation (Scotland)

Rank	CGA	Gold	Silver	Bronze	Total
1	England	4	2	6	12
2	Canada	4	2	1	7
3	India	2	1	1	4
4	Cyprus	1	2	4	7
5	New Zealand	1	0	1	2
6	Malaysia	1	0	0	1
6	Mauritius	1	0	0	1
8	Australia	0	5	2	7
9	Cameroon	0	1	2	3
10	South Africa	0	1	1	2
11	Northern Ireland	0	0	2	2
11	Scotland*	0	0	2	2
13	Bahamas	0	0	1	1
13	Gabon	0	0	1	1
13	Malta	0	0	1	1
13	Nigeria	0	0	1	1
13	The Gambia	0	0	1	1
13	Tonga	0	0	1	1
Totals (18 entries)		14	14	28	56

=== Men ===
Event	Gold	Silver	Bronze
60 kg	Harsh Singh; India	Joshua Katz; Australia	Charlie Ayre; England
60 kg	Harsh Singh; India	Joshua Katz; Australia	Pedro Neto; Australia
66 kg	Julien Frascadore; Canada	Georgios Balarjishvili; Cyprus	Michael Fryer; England
66 kg	Julien Frascadore; Canada	Georgios Balarjishvili; Cyprus	Petros Christodoulidis; Cyprus
73 kg	Ethan Nairne; England	Benjamin Levy; England	Joshua Green; Northern Ireland
73 kg	Ethan Nairne; England	Benjamin Levy; England	Faye Njie; The Gambia
81 kg	Amir Daniel Abdul Majeed; Malaysia	Timothy Meuwsen; South Africa	Keishin Ochi; Australia
81 kg	Amir Daniel Abdul Majeed; Malaysia	Timothy Meuwsen; South Africa	Odysseas Georgakis; Cyprus
90 kg	Rémi Feuillet; Mauritius	Guillaume Gaulin; Canada	Jamal Petgrave; England
90 kg	Rémi Feuillet; Mauritius	Guillaume Gaulin; Canada	Scott Cusack; Scotland
100 kg	Kyle Reyes; Canada	Max Gregory; England	Georgious Kroussaniotakis; Cyprus
100 kg	Kyle Reyes; Canada	Max Gregory; England	Franck Tahman Zan; Cameroon
+100 kg	Giannis Antoniou; Cyprus	Kayhan Ozcicek-Takagi; Australia	Kody Andrews; New Zealand
+100 kg	Giannis Antoniou; Cyprus	Kayhan Ozcicek-Takagi; Australia	Paula Monta; Tonga

=== Women ===
Event	Gold	Silver	Bronze
48 kg	Asmita Dey; India	Heidi Quach; Canada	Katryna Esposito; Malta
48 kg	Asmita Dey; India	Heidi Quach; Canada	Summer Shaw; Scotland
52 kg	Evelyn Beaton; Canada	Sofia Asvesta; Cyprus	Tatum Keen; England
52 kg	Evelyn Beaton; Canada	Sofia Asvesta; Cyprus	Marie-Céline Baba Matia; Cameroon
57 kg	Acelya Toprak; England	Yamini Mourya; India	Donne Breytenbach; South Africa
57 kg	Acelya Toprak; England	Yamini Mourya; India	Lele Neirne; England
63 kg	Laurence Biron; Canada	Saya Middleton; Australia	Unnati Sharma; India
63 kg	Laurence Biron; Canada	Saya Middleton; Australia	Enku Ekuta; Nigeria
70 kg	Kelly Petersen Pollard; England	Aoife Coughlan; Australia	Jemima Yeats-Brown; England
70 kg	Kelly Petersen Pollard; England	Aoife Coughlan; Australia	Rachael Hawkes; Northern Ireland
78 kg	Emma Reid; England	Maria Swan; Australia	Coralie Godbout; Canada
78 kg	Emma Reid; England	Maria Swan; Australia	Zanet Michaelidou; Cyprus
+78 kg	Sydnee Andrews; New Zealand	Richelle Soppi Mbella; Cameroon	Karra Hanna; Bahamas
+78 kg	Sydnee Andrews; New Zealand	Richelle Soppi Mbella; Cameroon	Marthe Gnacadja Avaro; Gabon

== Netball ==
Gold	Silver	Bronze
New Zealand; Coach: Noeline Taurua	Jamaica; Coach: Sasha-Gaye Henry-Wright	Australia; Coach: Stacey Marinkovich
Karin Burger (c); Maddy Gordon; Catherine Hall; Georgia Heffernan; Kate Heffernan (vc); Kelly Jackson; Grace Nweke; Kimiora Poi; Mila Reuelu-Buchanan; Martina Salmon; Carys Styhe; Amelia Walmsley	Shamera Sterling-Humphrey (c); Romelda Aiken; Shanice Beckford (vc); Kadie-Ann Dehaney; Rhea Dixon; Nicole Dixon-Rochester; Brie Grierson; Crystal Plummer; Abigale Sutherland; Jodi-Ann Ward; Azara Wilmot; Latanya Wilson (vc)	Liz Watson (c); Kiera Austin; Courtney Bruce; Sophie Dwyer; Sophie Garbin; Matilda Garrett; Georgie Horjus; Sarah Klau; Cara Koenen; Kate Moloney (vc); Jamie-Lee Price; Jo Weston

== Swimming ==
=== Medal table ===
* Host nation (Scotland)

Rank	CGA	Gold	Silver	Bronze	Total
1	Australia	37	16	23	76
2	South Africa	6	8	8	22
3	Scotland*	5	5	2	12
4	England	4	12	10	26
5	New Zealand	2	5	3	10
6	Canada	2	2	5	9
7	Jersey	1	1	0	2
8	Wales	0	3	3	6
9	Northern Ireland	0	2	2	4
10	Singapore	0	1	0	1
10	Uganda	0	1	0	1
Totals (11 entries)		57	56	56	169

=== Medalists ===
==== Men ====
Event	Gold		Silver		Bronze	
50 metre freestyle	Cameron McEvoy; Australia	20.97; GR	Flynn Southam; Australia	21.44	Jamie Jack; Australia	21.47
100 metre freestyle	Flynn Southam; Australia	47.13	Matt Richards; Wales	47.64	Kyle Chalmers; Australia	47.74
200 metre freestyle	Kai Taylor; Australia	1:45.22	James Guy; England Matt Richards; Wales	1:45.72	not awarded	
400 metre freestyle	Sam Short; Australia	3:41.25	Elijah Winnington; Australia	3:45.56	Ben Goedemans; Australia	3:45.57
800 metre freestyle	Sam Short; Australia	7:39.81; GR	Ben Goedemans; Australia	7:46.49	Matthew Galea; Australia	7:47.10
1500 metre freestyle	Sam Short; Australia	14:42.11	Daniel Wiffen; Northern Ireland	14:44.70	Ben Goedemans; Australia	14:49.50
50 metre backstroke	Pieter Coetze; South Africa	24.18; GR	Oliver Morgan; England	24.48	Ruard van Renen; South Africa	24.51
100 metre backstroke	Pieter Coetze; South Africa	51.77; CR, AF	Oliver Morgan; England	52.66	Ruard van Renen; South Africa	53.31
200 metre backstroke	Pieter Coetze; South Africa	1:54.22; GR	Oliver Morgan; England	1:56.44	Luke Greenbank; England	1:56.58
50 metre breaststroke	Sam Williamson; Australia	26.50	Michael Houlie; South Africa	26.77	Adam Ramsay-Peaty; England	26.94
100 metre breaststroke	Sam Williamson; Australia	59.17	Filip Nowacki; Jersey	59.34	Adam Ramsay-Peaty; England	59.65
200 metre breaststroke	Filip Nowacki; Jersey	2:07.87	Oliver Dawson; Canada	2:08.39; NR	Zac Stubblety-Cook; Australia	2:08.91
50 metre butterfly	Kyle Chalmers; Australia Ben Armbruster; Australia	22.73; GR, =OC	not awarded		Cameron McEvoy; Australia	22.92
100 metre butterfly	Joshua Liendo; Canada	50.42; GR	Matthew Temple; Australia	50.43	Ben Armbruster; Australia	50.58
200 metre butterfly	Lewis Clareburt; New Zealand	1:55.05	Harrison Turner; Australia	1:55.38	Matthew Temple; Australia	1:55.45
200 metre individual medley	Duncan Scott; Scotland	1:56.38; GR	Lewis Clareburt; New Zealand	1:56.77; NR	Tom Dean; England	1:57.22
400 metre individual medley	Lewis Clareburt; New Zealand	4:08.72	William Petric; Australia	4:11.02	Lorne Wigginton; Canada	4:11.38
4 × 100 metre freestyle relay	Australia; Flynn Southam (47.09) GR; Kai Taylor (47.53); Harrison Turner (47.94); Kyle Chalmers (46.93); Edward Sommerville^{[a]} Matthew Temple^{[a]} William Petric^{[a]} Jamie Jack^{[a]}	3:09.49; GR	England; Jacob Mills (48.02); James Guy (48.24); Gabriel Shepherd (47.73); Jacob Whittle (47.70); Edward Mildred^{[a]} Cameron Brooker^{[a]} Oliver Morgan^{[a]} Tom Dean^{[a]}	3:11.69	South Africa; Pieter Coetze (48.38); Guy Brooks (48.98); Ruard van Renen (48.34); Chad le Clos (48.29); Kris Mihaylov^{[a]}	3:13.99
4 × 200 metre freestyle relay	Australia; Samuel Short (1:46.08); Harrison Turner (1:45.95); Edward Sommerville (1:45.34); Kai Taylor (1:44.10); William Petric^{[a]} Brendon Smith^{[a]} Elijah Winnington^{[a]}	7:01.47; GR	England; Gabriel Shepherd (1:46.67); Thomas Dean (1:45.63); James Guy (1:44.03); Max Litchfield (1:48.65); Cameron Brooker^{[a]} Jacob Whittle^{[a]} Jacob Mills^{[a]}	7:04.98	Wales; Matt Richards (1:45.42); Dan Jones (1:49.13); Kieran Bird (1:47.54); Tyler Melbourne-Smith (1:47.50); Harry Milne^{[a]} Jack Knight^{[a]} Lewis Fraser^{[a]}	7:09.59
4 × 100 metre medley relay	Australia; Henry Allan (53.58); Samuel Williamson (58.40); Matthew Temple (50.18); Flynn Southam (46.55); Isaac Cooper^{[a]} Zac Stubblety-Cook^{[a]} Ben Armbruster^{[a]} Jamie Jack^{[a]}	3:28.71; GR	England; Oliver Morgan (53.20); Adam Ramsay-Peaty (58.74); Edward Mildred (51.04); Jacob Mills (47.70); Luke Greenbank^{[a]} Gregory Butler^{[a]} Jacob Peters^{[a]} Jacob Whittle^{[a]}	3:30.68	South Africa; Pieter Coetze (51.71) CR, AF; Michael Houlie (59.41); Chad le Clos (51.27); Ruard van Renen (48.74); Chris Smith^{[a]} Jarden Eaton^{[a]} Guy Brooks^{[a]}	3:31.13 AF

==== Men's parasport ====
Event	Gold		Silver		Bronze	
50 metre freestyle S7	Christian Sadie; South Africa	28.06; GR	Toh Wei Soong; Singapore	29.36	Bruce Dee; England	31.33
50 metre freestyle S13	Stephen Clegg; Scotland	24.73	Nathan Hendricks; South Africa	24.84	Nicolas-Guy Turbide; Canada	24.96
100 metre freestyle S13	Nathan Hendricks; South Africa	54.54	James Clegg; Scotland	55.16	Matthew Redfern; England	56.86
100 metre backstroke S9	Timothy Hodge; Australia	1:03.00	Barry McClements; Northern Ireland	1:03.68	Harrison Vig; Australia	1:04.87
100 metre breaststroke SB9	Beau Matthews; Australia	1:09.41	Joshua Willmer; New Zealand	1:11.44	Timothy Hodge; Australia	1:12.74
100 metre butterfly S10	Alex Saffy; Australia	57.11	Col Pearse; Australia	57.49	Jack Gill; Canada	1:00.30
200 metre freestyle S14	William Ellard; England	1:51.66; GR	Jack Ireland; Australia	1:55.22	Rhys Darbey; Wales	1:56.24

==== Women ====
Event	Gold		Silver		Bronze	
50 metre freestyle	Meg Harris; Australia	24.23	Alex Perkins; Australia	24.53	Shayna Jack; Australia	24.57
100 metre freestyle	Meg Harris; Australia	52.90	Mollie O'Callaghan; Australia	53.25	Shayna Jack; Australia	53.38
200 metre freestyle	Mollie O'Callaghan; Australia	1:54.66	Lani Pallister; Australia	1:55.01	Erika Fairweather; New Zealand	1:55.24
400 metre freestyle	Lani Pallister; Australia	3:59.56	Erika Fairweather; New Zealand	4:02.65	Jenna Forrester; Australia	4:05.25
800 metre freestyle	Lani Pallister; Australia	8:11.12; GR	Erika Fairweather; New Zealand	8:24.97	Molly Walker; Australia	8:25.93
1500 metre freestyle	Lani Pallister; Australia	15:41.03; GR	Erika Fairweather; New Zealand	15:58.97	Molly Walker; Australia	16:01.37
50 metre backstroke	Kylie Masse; Canada	27.32	Iona Anderson; Australia	27.45	Lauren Cox; England	27.56
100 metre backstroke	Iona Anderson; Australia	58.71	Kylie Masse; Canada	58.77	Olivia Nel; South Africa	1:00.09; NR
200 metre backstroke	Jenna Forrester; Australia	2:08.17	Katie Shanahan; Scotland	2:08.54	Hannah Fredericks; Australia	2:09.02
50 metre breaststroke	Lara van Niekerk; South Africa	30.43	Sienna Toohey; Australia	30.54	Imogen Clark; England Sophie Angus; Canada	30.86
100 metre breaststroke	Angharad Evans; Scotland	1:06.07	Aimee Canny; South Africa	1:06.19	Sienna Toohey; Australia	1:06.47
200 metre breaststroke	Angharad Evans; Scotland	2:23.79	Kaylene Corbett; South Africa	2:24.46	Ellie McCartney; Northern Ireland	2:24.73
50 metre butterfly	Alexandria Perkins; Australia	25.37	Erin Gallagher; South Africa	25.57	Hazel Ouwehand; New Zealand	25.76
100 metre butterfly	Alexandria Perkins; Australia	56.38	Keanna Macinnes; Scotland	57.33	Erin Gallagher; South Africa	57.39
200 metre butterfly	Brittany Castelluzzo; Australia	2:06.56	Keanna Macinnes; Scotland	2:06.76	Elizabeth Dekkers; Australia	2:06.91
200 metre individual medley	Jenna Forrester; Australia	2:09.24	Aimee Canny; South Africa	2:09.37; NR	Amalie Smith; England	2:09.61
400 metre individual medley	Jenna Forrester; Australia	4:31.19	Amalie Smith; England	4:33.70	Ella Ramsay; Australia	4:37.12
4 × 100 metre freestyle relay	Australia; Meg Harris (53.07); Shayna Jack (52.64); Alexandria Perkins (52.88); Mollie O'Callaghan (52.81); Hannah Casey^{[a]} Brittany Castelluzzo^{[a]} Inez Miller^{[a]} Jessica Cole^{[a]}	3:31.40	England; Eva Okaro (54.50); Freya Colbert (53.41); Leah Schlosshan (53.97); Freya Anderson (53.78); Abbie Wood^{[a]} Erin Little^{[a]} Darcy Revitt^{[a]} Amalie Smith^{[a]}	3:35.66	South Africa; Aimee Canny (54.40); Rebecca Meder (54.46); Erin Gallagher (55.52); Olivia Nel (54.29); Georgia Nel^{[a]} Jessica Thompson^{[a]} Caitlin de Lange^{[a]}	3:38.67; AF
4 × 200 metre freestyle relay	Australia; Lani Pallister (1:55.13); Hannah Casey (1:55.43); Inez Miller (1:55.78); Mollie O'Callaghan (1:56.19)	7:42.53	England; Freya Colbert (1:55.98); Abbie Wood (1:58.15); Leah Schlosshan (1:58.22); Freya Anderson (1:57.75)	7:50.10	New Zealand; Erika Fairweather (1:55.92); Caitlin Deans (1:58.12); Eve Thomas (1:59.57); Milana Tapper (1:58.33)	7:51.94
4 × 100 metre medley relay	Australia; Iona Anderson (58.83); Sienna Toohey (1:06.75); Alexandria Perkins (56.30); Meg Harris (52.37); Hannah Fredericks^{[a]} Brittany Castelluzzo^{[a]} Mollie O'Callaghan^{[a]}	3:54.25	Scotland; Katie Shanahan (1:00.66); Angharad Evans (1:04.83); Keanna Macinnes (57.67); Evie Davis (53.86); Holly McGill^{[a]} Anna Morgan^{[a]} Ciara Schlosshan^{[a]} Emma Wood^{[a]}	3:57.02	South Africa; Olivia Nel (1:00.38); Aimee Canny (1:06.37); Erin Gallagher (57.04); Rebecca Meder (54.79); Jessica Thompson^{[a]} Lara van Niekerk^{[a]} Georgia Nel^{[a]}	3:58.58

==== Women's parasport ====
Event	Gold		Silver		Bronze	
50 metre freestyle S13	Kirralee Hayes; Australia	27.63	Danika Vyncka; South Africa	28.41	Jenna Jones; Australia	29.02
100 metre freestyle S9	Lakeisha Patterson; Australia	1:02.99	Emily Beecroft; Australia	1:03.56	Toni Shaw; Scotland	1:04.71
100 metre freestyle S13	Jenna Jones; Australia	1:03.89	Ela Letton-Jones; Wales	1:04.30	Kirralee Hayes; Australia	1:04.42
200 metre freestyle S14	Georgia Sheffield; England	2:06.07; GR	Poppy Maskill; England	2:07.44	Bethany Firth; Northern Ireland	2:07.63
100 metre backstroke S9	Alice Tai; England	1:11.93; GR	Gemma Sellick; Australia	1:14.06	Victoria Belando Nicholson; Australia	1:15.11
100 metre breaststroke SB8	Brock Whiston; England	1:22.05	Husnah Kukundakwe; Uganda	1:26.20	Iona Winnifrith; England	1:26.31
200 metre individual medley SM10	Faye Rogers; Scotland	2:29.61	Jasmine Greenwood; Australia	2:32.13	Mary Jibb; Canada	2:32.54

==== Mixed ====
Event	Gold		Silver		Bronze	
4 × 100 metre freestyle relay	Australia; Flynn Southam (47.29); Kyle Chalmers (47.62); Shayna Jack (52.42); Meg Harris (52.03); Kai Taylor^{[a]} Harrison Turner^{[a]} Hannah Casey^{[a]} Alexandria Perkins^{[a]}	3:19.36; GR	England; Jacob Mills (48.22); Jacob Whittle (48.25); Freya Anderson (53.98); Freya Colbert (53.46); Gabriel Shephard^{[a]} Tom Dean^{[a]} Abbie Wood^{[a]} Erin Little^{[a]}	3:23.91	Wales; Matt Richards (47.62); Dan Jones (49.17); Bex Sutton (54.91); Theodora Taylor (52.63); Harry Milne^{[a]} Kieran Bird^{[a]} Medi Harris^{[a]} Meghan Higgs^{[a]}	3:24.33
4 × 100 metre medley relay	Australia; Iona Anderson (59.44); Sam Williamson (58.81); Matthew Temple (50.05); Meg Harris (52.16); Brittany Castelluzzo^{[a]} Hannah Fredericks^{[a]} Harrison Turner^{[a]}	3:40.46; GR	South Africa; Pieter Coetze (51.98) GR; Michael Houlie (59.65); Erin Gallagher (57.40); Aimee Canny (53.58); Chad le Clos^{[a]} Georgia Nel^{[a]} Hannah Pearse^{[a]} Chris Smith^{[a]}	3:42.61	Scotland; Matthew Ward (53.55); Angharad Evans (1:04.52); Keanna Macinnes (57.60); Duncan Scott (48.03); Dean Fearn^{[a]} Lucy Grieve^{[a]} Joshua Mitchell^{[a]} Emma Wood^{[a]}	3:43.70

^{a} Swimmers who participated in the heats only and received medals.

== Track cycling ==
=== Medal table ===
* Host nation (Scotland)

Rank	Nation	Gold	Silver	Bronze	Total
1	Australia	10	10	8	28
2	Wales	6	3	2	11
3	England	3	7	5	15
4	New Zealand	3	3	5	11
5	Scotland*	2	2	4	8
6	Isle of Man	1	0	0	1
6	Malaysia	1	0	0	1
8	Trinidad and Tobago	0	1	1	2
9	Canada	0	0	1	1
Totals (9 entries)		26	26	26	78

=== Medalists ===
==== Men ====
Event	Gold	Silver	Bronze
Sprint	Leigh Hoffman; Australia	Nicholas Paul; Trinidad and Tobago	Tayte Ryan; Australia
Team sprint	Australia; Daniel Barber; Ryan Elliott; Leigh Hoffman	England; Harry Ledingham-Horn; Joseph Truman; Hamish Turnbull	Trinidad and Tobago; Nicholas Paul; Njisane Phillip; Zion Pulido
Keirin	Azizulhasni Awang; Malaysia	Leigh Hoffman; Australia	Harry Ledingham-Horn; England
1 km time trial	Leigh Hoffman; Australia	Joseph Truman; England	Tayte Ryan; Australia
Individual pursuit	Oliver Bleddyn; Australia	Conor Leahy; Australia	James Moriarty; Australia
Team pursuit	England; Henry Hobbs; Charlie Tanfield; William Tidball; Ethan Vernon	Australia; Blake Agnoletto; Oliver Bleddyn; Conor Leahy; James Moriarty	New Zealand; Marshall Erwood; George Jackson; Daniel Morton; Thomas Sexton
Points race	Matthew Bostock; Isle of Man	Oliver Bleddyn; Australia	George Jackson; New Zealand
Scratch race	Henry Hobbs; England	Thomas Cornish; Australia	Ethan Vernon; England
Elimination race	Blake Agnoletto; Australia	Mark Stewart; Scotland	Henry Hobbs; England

==== Women ====
Event	Gold	Silver	Bronze
Sprint	Emma Finucane; Wales	Sophie Capewell; England	Rhian Edmunds; Wales
Team sprint	Wales; Rhian Edmunds; Emma Finucane; Lowri Thomas	England; Sophie Capewell; Katy Marchant; Rhianna Parris-Smith	Scotland; Lauren Bell; Iona Moir; Madeleine Silcock
Keirin	Emma Finucane; Wales	Ellesse Andrews; New Zealand	Kristina Clonan; Australia
1 km time trial	Emma Finucane; Wales	Claudia Marcks; Australia	Ellesse Andrews; New Zealand
Individual pursuit	Anna Morris; Wales	Josie Knight; England	Erin Boothman; Scotland
Team pursuit	Australia; Georgia Baker; Claudia Marcks; Alyssa Polites; Felicity Wilson-Haffenden	New Zealand; Bryony Botha; Prudence Fowler; Emily Shearman; Ally Wollaston	Wales; Megan Barker; Anna Morris; Ciara Oliva; Jessica Roberts
Points race	Anna Morris; Wales	Jessica Roberts; Wales	Georgia Baker; Australia
Scratch race	Georgia Baker; Australia	Samantha Donnelly; New Zealand	Erin Boothman; Scotland
Elimination race	Alyssa Polites; Australia	Georgia Baker; Australia	Maggie Coles-Lyster; Canada

==== Para Men ====
Event	Gold	Silver	Bronze
Men's tandem sprint B	Scotland; Neil Fachie; Aaron Pope (Pilot)	Wales; James Ball; Matt Rotherham (Pilot)	Australia; Kane Perris; Luke Zaccaria (Pilot)
Men's tandem 1 km time trial B	Scotland; Neil Fachie; Aaron Pope (Pilot)	Wales; James Ball; Matt Rotherham (Pilot)	Australia; Kane Perris; Luke Zaccaria (Pilot)
Men's 1 km time trial C1–3	Devon Briggs; New Zealand	Gordon Allan; Australia	Fin Graham; Scotland
Men's individual pursuit C1–3	Matthew Robertson; England	Fin Graham; Scotland	Devon Briggs; New Zealand

==== Para women ====
Event	Gold	Silver	Bronze
Women's tandem sprint B	New Zealand; Emma Foy; Jessie Hodges (Pilot)	Australia; Jessica Gallagher; Jacqui Mengler-Mohr (Pilot)	England; Elizabeth Jordan; Sylvia Misztal (Pilot)
Women's tandem 1 km time trial B	New Zealand; Emma Foy; Jessie Hodges (Pilot)	Australia; Jessica Gallagher; Jacqui Mengler-Mohr (Pilot)	England; Sophie Unwin; Anna Whitworth-Hay (Pilot)
Women's individual pursuit C4–5	Tara Neyland; Australia	Morgan Newberry; England	Nicole Murray; New Zealand
Women's 1 km time trial C4–5	Tara Neyland; Australia	Kadeena Cox; England	Erin Normoyle; Australia

== Weightlifting ==
=== Medal table ===
* Host nation (Scotland)

Rank	CGA	Gold	Silver	Bronze	Total
1	Malaysia	5	1	1	7
2	Nigeria	3	1	0	4
3	Canada	2	2	4	8
4	India	1	6	1	8
5	England	1	4	2	7
6	New Zealand	1	1	0	2
6	Samoa	1	1	0	2
8	Australia	1	0	2	3
9	Fiji	1	0	0	1
10	Nauru	0	0	2	2
11	Kenya	0	0	1	1
11	Papua New Guinea	0	0	1	1
11	Scotland*	0	0	1	1
11	Wales	0	0	1	1
Totals (14 entries)		16	16	16	48

=== Medalists ===
==== Men's events ====
Event	Gold		Silver		Bronze	
60 kg	Aniq Kasdan; Malaysia	273 kg GR	Rishikanta Chanambam; India	264 kg	Joshua Amunga Mboya; Kenya	260 kg
65 kg	Aznil Bidin; Malaysia	299 kg GR	Muthupandi Raja; India	286 kg	Morea Baru; Papua New Guinea	282 kg
71 kg	Edidiong Umoafia; Nigeria	319 kg GR	John Tafi; Samoa	314 kg	Ezekiel Moses; Nauru	310 kg
79 kg	Muhammad Erry Hidayat; Malaysia	331 kg GR	Ajaya Babu Valluri; India	330 kg	Chris Murray; England	325 kg
88 kg	Muhammad Hafizuddin Roslin; Malaysia	345 kg GR	Cameron McTaggart; New Zealand	338 kg	Angus Doig; Scotland	309 kg
94 kg	Mohamad Syahmi; Malaysia	347 kg GR	Alex Bellemarre; Canada	346 kg	Oliver Saxton; Australia	336 kg
110 kg	Taniela Rainibogi; Fiji	378 kg GR	Cyrille Tchatchet; England	374 kg	Xavier Lusignan; Canada	356 kg
+110 kg	David Liti; New Zealand	389 kg GR	Lovepreet Singh; India	388 kg	Andrew Griffiths; England	356 kg

==== Women's events ====
Event	Gold		Silver		Bronze	
48 kg	Mirabai Chanu; India	190 kg GR	Ruth Nyong; Nigeria	168 kg	Irene Jane Henry; Malaysia	167 kg
53 kg	Omolola Onome Didih; Nigeria	206 kg CR, GR	Gyaneshwari Yadav; India	199 kg	Rebekah Groulx; Canada	178 kg
58 kg	Rafiatu Folashade Lawal; Nigeria	229 kg GR	Ann-Sophie Taschereau; Canada	215 kg	Bindyarani Devi Sorokhaibam; India	199 kg
63 kg	Maude Charron; Canada	232 kg GR	Sarah Davies; England	217 kg	Femily-Crystie Notte; Nauru	216 kg
69 kg	Charlotte Simoneau; Canada	240 kg GR	Harjinder Kaur; India	227 kg	Nya Hayman; Australia	218 kg
77 kg	Seine Stowers; Samoa	237 kg GR	Isabella Brown; England	229 kg	Laura Hughes; Wales	224 kg
86 kg	Eileen Cikamatana; Australia	248 kg GR	Madias Nzesso; England	239 kg	Rose Beaudoin; Canada	230 kg
+86 kg	Emily Campbell; England	278 kg GR	Siti Binti-Draman; Malaysia	253 kg	Etta Love; Canada	250 kg

== See also ==
- 2026 Commonwealth Games medal table
