= Cycling at the 2024 Summer Paralympics – Men's time trial =

The men's time trial track cycling events at the 2024 Summer Paralympics will take place between August 29 to 1 September 2024 at the Vélodrome National, Paris.

Three events will take place in the men's event also over six classifications. Two of the races will be factored races for multiple classifications; the third will be for visual impairment only. The race distance shall be 1000m in each event.

== Classification ==
Cyclists are given a classification depending on the type and extent of their disability. The classification system allows cyclists to compete against others with a similar level of function. The class number indicates the severity of impairment with "1" being most impaired.

Cycling classes are:

- B: Blind and visually impaired cyclists use a Tandem bicycle with a sighted pilot on the front
- C 1-5: Cyclists with an impairment that affects their legs, arms, and/or trunk but are capable of using a standard bicycle

== Medal table ==
* Host nation (France)

Rank	NPC	Gold	Silver	Bronze	Total
1	Great Britain (GBR)	1	2	0	3
2	China (CHN)	1	1	0	2
3	Australia (AUS)	1	0	0	1
4	France (FRA)*	0	0	1	1
4	Germany (GER)	0	0	1	1
4	Spain (ESP)	0	0	1	1
Totals (6 entries)		3	3	3	9

== Medal summary ==
Classification	Gold		Silver		Bronze	
B	James Ball piloted by Steffan Lloyd; Great Britain	58.964	Neil Fachie piloted by Matt Rotherham; Great Britain	59.312	Thomas Ulbricht piloted by Robert Foerstemann; Germany	59.862
C1-3	Li Zhangyu; China	1:03.480	Liang Weicong; China	1:04.103	Alexandre Leaute; France	1:04.207
C4-5	Korey Boddington; Australia	1:01.650	Blaine Hunt; Great Britain	1:01.776	Alfonso Cabello Llamas; Spain	1:01.969
