= Cycling at the 2020 Summer Paralympics – Men's time trial =

The men's time trial track cycling events at the 2020 Summer Paralympics will take place between August 26 to 28 at Izu Velodrome, Japan. A total of three events will take place in the men's event over six classifications. Two of those three events spanned multiple classifications were 'factored' events, with final times adjusted in line with classification to ensure fairness. The distances of all three events are 1000m.

== Classification ==
Cyclists are given a classification depending on the type and extent of their disability. The classification system allows cyclists to compete against others with a similar level of function. The class number indicates the severity of impairment with "1" being most impaired.

Cycling classes are:

- B: Blind and visually impaired cyclists use a Tandem bicycle with a sighted pilot on the front
- T 1–2: Cyclists with an impairment that affects their balance use a tricycle
- C 1-5: Cyclists with an impairment that affects their legs, arms, and/or trunk but are capable of using a standard bicycle

== Schedule ==
F	Finals

Men's time trial
Event↓/Date →	August 26	August 27	August 28
B	F		
C1-3		F	
C4-5			F

== Medal table ==
Rank	NPC	Gold	Silver	Bronze	Total
1	Great Britain	1	2	1	4
2	China	1	0	0	1
2	Spain	1	0	0	1
4	France	0	1	1	2
5	Slovakia	0	0	1	1
Totals (5 entries)		3	3	3	9

== Medal summary ==
Classification	Gold		Silver		Bronze	
B	Great Britain; Neil Fachie piloted by Matt Rotherham	58.038 WR	Great Britain; James Ball piloted by Lewis Stewart	59.503	France; Raphael Beaugillet piloted by François Pervis	1:00.472
C1-3	Li Zhangyu; China	1:03.877 WR	Alexandre Léauté; France	1:05.031 WR	Jaco van Gass; Great Britain	1:05.569 WR
C4-5	Alfonso Cabello; Spain	1:01.557 WR	Jody Cundy; Great Britain	1:01.847 PR	Jozef Metelka; Slovakia	1:04.786
