= Track cycling at the 2026 Commonwealth Games – Men's tandem sprint B =

Men's tandem sprint B at the 2026 Commonwealth Games
- Venue: Sir Chris Hoy Velodrome
- Dates: 1 August
- Competitors: 12 from 6 nations

Medalists
gold medal	Neil Fachie; Aaron Pope	Scotland
silver medal	James Ball; Matt Rotherham	Wales
bronze medal	Kane Perris; Luke Zaccaria	Australia

The men's tandem sprint B at the 2026 Commonwealth Games was part of the cycling programme, and took place on 1 August 2026.

== Records ==
Prior to this competition, the existing world and Games records were as follows:

World record	Neil Fachie (GBR)	9.568	Brisbane, Australia	7 April 2018
Games record	Neil Fachie (SCO)	9.568	Brisbane, Australia	7 April 2018

== Schedule ==
The schedule is as follows:

All times are British Summer Time (UTC+1)

Date	Time	Round
Saturday 1 August 2026	10:42	Qualifying
Saturday 1 August 2026	11:25	Semifinals
Saturday 1 August 2026	15:02	Finals

== Results ==
=== Qualification ===
Qualification took place on the morning of 1 August 2026. Six teams entered a 200 metre flying start time trial, with the top four teams moving to the semi-finals.

Rank	Name	Country	Time	Time behind	Average Speed (km/h)	Notes
1	Neil Fachie pilot:Aaron Pope	Scotland	9.757	-	73.793	Q
2	Kane Perris pilot:Luke Zaccaria	Australia	9.917	+0.160	72.603	Q
3	James Ball pilot:Matthew Rotherham	Wales	9.927	+0.170	72.529	Q
4	Mohd Khairul Wahab pilot:Muhammad Nabil Wafiq Zamri	Malaysia	10.491	+0.734	68.630	Q
5	Oyindamola Tijani pilot:Okeyah Bethel	Nigeria	12.026	+2.269	59.870	
6	Kennedy Ogada pilot:Fabian Gathoni	Kenya	12.618	+2.861	57.061	

=== Semi finals ===
The semi finals were held over a best of three match sprint series. the winners qualified for the gold medal match, while the runners-up entered the bronze medal match.

Rank	Name	Country	Race 1	Race 2	Decider	Notes
Heat 1
1	Neil Fachie pilot:Aaron Pope	Scotland	Winner	Winner		QG
2	Mohd Khairul Wahab pilot:Muhammad Nabil Wafiq Zamri	Malaysia	+0.174	+0.505		QB
			68.643 km/h	67.937 km/h		
Heat 2
1	James Ball pilot:Matthew Rotherham	Wales	Winner	Winner		QG
2	Kane Perris pilot:Luke Zaccaria	Australia	+0.387	+0.050		QB
			69.693 km/h	68.966 km/h		

=== Finals ===
The finals took place on the evening of 1 August 2026. As with the semi-finals, both matches were held as best of three match sprints.

Scotland's Neil Fachie won the title in his final race as a professional para cycling athlete, his sixth and final Commonwealth Games gold medal, to become his nations most successful Commonwealth Games athlete.

Rank	Name	Country	Race 1	Race 2	Decider	Notes
For gold
1st place, gold medalist(s)	Neil Fachie pilot:Aaron Pope	Scotland	Winner	+0.091	Winner	
2nd place, silver medalist(s)	James Ball pilot:Matthew Rotherham	Wales	+0.164	Winner	+0.077	
			70.783 km/h	70.306 km/h	68.376 km/h	
For bronze
3rd place, bronze medalist(s)	Kane Perris pilot:Luke Zaccaria	Australia	Winner	Winner		
4	Mohd Khairul Wahab pilot:Muhammad Nabil Wafiq Zamri	Malaysia	+0.179	+2.145		
			67.576 km/h	68.027 km/h		
