= Cycling at the 2022 Commonwealth Games – Men's tandem 1 km time trial B =

Men's tandem 1 km time trial B at the 2022 Commonwealth Games
- Venue: Lee Valley VeloPark
- Dates: 29 August
- Competitors: 14 (including pilots) from 6 nations
- Winning time: 59.938 GR

Medalists
gold medal	Neil Fachie; Lewis Stewart (pilot)	Scotland
silver medal	James Ball; Matt Rotherham (pilot)	Wales
bronze medal	Stephen Bate; Christopher Latham (pilot)	England

The Men's tandem 1 km time trial B at the 2022 Commonwealth Games, was part of the cycling programme, which took place on 29 July 2022. This event was for blind and visually impaired cyclists riding with a sighted pilot.

== Records ==
Prior to this competition, the existing world and Games records were as follows:

World record	Neil Fachie (GBR)	58.039	Izu, Japan	28 August 2021
Games record	Neil Fachie (SCO)	1:00.065	Brisbane, Australia	5 April 2018

== Schedule ==
The schedule is as follows:

All times are British Summer Time (UTC+1)

Date	Time	Round
Friday 29 July 2022	16:10	Final

Rank	Nation	Riders	Time	Behind	Avg. speed (km/h)	Notes
1st place, gold medalist(s)	Scotland	Neil Fachie; Lewis Stewart (pilot)	59.938		60.062	GR
2nd place, silver medalist(s)	Wales	James Ball; Matt Rotherham (pilot)	1:00.053	+0.115	59.947	
3rd place, bronze medalist(s)	England	Stephen Bate; Christopher Latham (pilot)	1:02.276	+2.338	57.807	
4	Australia	Beau Wootton; Luke Zaccaria (pilot)	1:02.824	+2.886	57.303	
5	Wales	Alex Pope; Steffan Lloyd (pilot)	1:03.912	+3.974	56.327	
6	Kenya	Kennedy Ogada; Peter Njoki (pilot)	1:20.172	+20.234	44.903	
7	Ghana	Frederick Assor; Rudolf Mensah (pilot)	1:25.240	+25.302	42.234	
