= Track cycling at the 2026 Commonwealth Games – Men's tandem 1 km time trial B =

Men's tandem 1 km time trial B at the 2026 Commonwealth Games
- Venue: Sir Chris Hoy Velodrome
- Dates: 30 July
- Competitors: 12 (including pilots) from 6 nations
- Winning time: 1:00.162

Medalists
gold medal	Neil Fachie; Aaron Pope (pilot)	Scotland
silver medal	James Ball; Matt Rotherham (pilot)	Wales
bronze medal	Kane Perris; Luke Zaccaria (pilot)	Australia

The Men's tandem 1 km time trial B at the 2026 Commonwealth Games was part of the cycling programme, which took place on 30 July 2026. This event was for blind and visually impaired cyclists riding with a sighted pilot.

== Records ==
Prior to this competition, the existing world and Games records were as follows:

World record	Neil Fachie (GBR)	58.039	Izu, Japan	28 August 2021
Games record	Neil Fachie (SCO)	59.938	London, United Kingdom	29 July 2022

== Schedule ==
The schedule was as follows:

All times are British Summer Time (UTC+1)

Date	Time	Round
Thursday 30 July 2026	16:10	Final

== Results ==
The results of the time trial were as follows:

Rank	Nation	Riders	Time	Behind	Avg. speed (km/h)	Notes
1st place, gold medalist(s)	Scotland	Neil Fachie; Aaron Pope (pilot)	1:00.162		59.838	
2nd place, silver medalist(s)	Wales	James Ball; Matthew Rotherham (pilot)	1:00.546	+0.384	59.459	
3rd place, bronze medalist(s)	Australia	Kane Perris; Luke Zaccaria (pilot)	1:01.873	+1.711	58.184	
4	Malaysia	Mohd Khairul Hazwan Wahab; Muhammad Nabil Wafiq Zamri (pilot)	1:05.863	+5.701	54.659	
5	Nigeria	Oyindamola Abdullahi Tijani; Okeyah Bethel (pilot)	1:14.504	+14.342	48.320	
6	Kenya	Kennedy Ivuzu Ogada; Fabian Gathoni (pilot)	1:22.052	+21.890	43.875	
