= Athletics at the 2008 Summer Paralympics – Men's pentathlon P12 =

The Men's Pentathlon P12 had its competition held on September 12, with the Long Jump starting at 9:00 and the 1,500m - the last event - at 19:25.

== Medalists ==
Gold	Hilton Langenhoven; South Africa
Silver	Thomas Ulbricht; Germany
Bronze	Mahmoud Khaldi; Tunisia

== Results ==
=== Long Jump ===
Place	Athlete	1	2	3	Best	Points	Total
1	Hilton Langenhoven (RSA)	x	7.24	x	7.24	871	871
2	Ruslan Katyshev (UKR)	6.29	6.58	6.52	6.58	716	716
3	Mahmoud Khaldi (TUN)	6.41	6.58	6.48	6.58	716	716
4	Thomas Ulbricht (GER)	6.58	6.43	x	6.58	716	716
5	Stephane Bozzolo (FRA)	6.52	6.55	6.49	6.55	709	709
6	Antoine Perel (FRA)	6.48	6.39	6.44	6.48	693	693
7	Kurt Vanraefelghem (BEL)	6.33	6.12	6.26	6.33	659	659
8	Jorg Trippen-Hilgers (GER)	6.05	6.24	6.09	6.24	639	639
9	Branimir Budetic (CRO)	5.98	6.13	5.95	6.13	615	615
10	Zhu Pengkai (CHN)	5.99	5.78	4.88	5.99	584	584
11	Abderrahim Zhiou (TUN)	5.93	5.84	5.88	5.93	571	571
12	Gabriel Potra (POR)	5.75	5.80	5.91	5.91	567	567
13	Dimitrios Aziotis (GRE)	4.87	x	5.60	5.60	502	502
14	Goran Zezelj (CRO)	5.52	5.47	4.56	5.52	485	485
	Aliaksandr Tryputs (BLR)				DNS	0	0

=== Javelin Throw ===
Place	Athlete	1	2	3	Best	Points	Total
1	Branimir Budetic (CRO)	51.00	50.61	54.14	54.14	650	1265
2	Zhu Pengkai (CHN)	52.01	52.43	-	52.43	625	1209
3	Thomas Ulbricht (GER)	47.80	40.03	41.10	47.80	556	1272
4	Stephane Bozzolo (FRA)	43.92	46.24	43.68	46.24	533	1242
5	Kurt Vanraefelghem (BEL)	44.35	43.93	39.86	44.35	505	1164
6	Hilton Langenhoven (RSA)	43.56	43.40	42.10	43.56	494	1365
7	Mahmoud Khaldi (TUN)	40.43	42.79	41.55	42.79	483	1199
8	Jorg Trippen-Hilgers (GER)	42.22	41.26	36.71	42.22	474	1113
9	Antoine Perel (FRA)	36.74	33.65	42.01	42.01	471	1164
10	Ruslan Katyshev (UKR)	38.50	36.86	40.96	40.96	456	1172
11	Dimitrios Aziotis (GRE)	40.87	38.73	37.45	40.87	455	957
12	Abderrahim Zhiou (TUN)	33.97	38.29	x	38.29	417	988
13	Gabriel Potra (POR)	33.94	36.11	34.46	36.11	386	953
14	Goran Zezelj (CRO)	33.63	29.77	34.67	34.67	365	850

=== 100 metres ===
Place	Athlete	Time	Points	Total
1	Hilton Langenhoven (RSA)	10.89	885	2250
2	Gabriel Potra (POR)	11.37	780	1733
3	Mahmoud Khaldi (TUN)	11.46	761	1960
4	Thomas Ulbricht (GER)	11.49	755	2027
5	Ruslan Katyshev (UKR)	11.74	703	1875
6	Goran Zezelj (CRO)	11.87	677	1527
7	Dimitrios Aziotis (GRE)	11.90	671	1628
8	Stephane Bozzolo (FRA)	11.95	661	1903
9	Kurt Vanraefelghem (BEL)	12.02	647	1811
10	Jorg Trippen-Hilgers (GER)	12.11	629	1742
11	Abderrahim Zhiou (TUN)	12.18	616	1604
12	Branimir Budetic (CRO)	12.34	586	1851
13	Antoine Perel (FRA)	12.42	571	1735
	Zhu Pengkai (CHN)	DNS	0	1209

=== Discus Throw ===
Place	Athlete	1	2	3	Best	Points	Total
1	Ruslan Katyshev (UKR)	x	34.87	31.48	34.87	561	2436
2	Jorg Trippen-Hilgers (GER)	x	33.79	34.54	34.54	554	2296
3	Branimir Budetic (CRO)	x	33.64	x	33.64	537	2388
4	Kurt Vanraefelghem (BEL)	33.12	32.53	x	33.12	526	2337
5	Stephane Bozzolo (FRA)	30.09	32.64	27.76	32.64	517	2420
6	Thomas Ulbricht (GER)	28.55	30.40	30.19	30.30	472	2499
7	Hilton Langenhoven (RSA)	30.17	x	26.70	30.17	468	2718
8	Goran Zezelj (CRO)	27.57	30.13	26.87	30.13	467	1994
9	Abderrahim Zhiou (TUN)	28.71	29.82	26.71	29.82	461	2065
10	Mahmoud Khaldi (TUN)	25.87	x	28.77	28.77	440	2400
11	Antoine Perel (FRA)	25.86	28.05	x	28.05	426	2161
	Dimitrios Aziotis (GRE)	x	x	x	NM	0	1628
	Gabriel Potra (POR)	-	-	-	NM	0	1733

=== 1,500 metres ===
Place	Athlete	Time	Points	Total
1	Abderrahim Zhiou (TUN)	3:55.77	985	3050
2	Mahmoud Khaldi (TUN)	4:29.31	749	3149
3	Branimir Budetic (CRO)	4:34.74	714	3102
4	Stephane Bozzolo (FRA)	4:38.23	691	3111
5	Hilton Langenhoven (RSA)	4:39.27	685	3403
6	Thomas Ulbricht (GER)	4:40.16	679	3178
7	Antoine Perel (FRA)	4:41.20	673	2834
8	Kurt Vanraefelghem (BEL)	4:43.32	660	2997
9	Ruslan Katyshev (UKR)	4:54.69	591	3027
10	Goran Zezelj (CRO)	5:28.70	406	2400
11	Jorg Trippen-Hilgers (GER)	5:31.29	393	2689

== Final classification ==
Place	Athlete	Total
1	Hilton Langenhoven (RSA)	3403
2	Thomas Ulbricht (GER)	3178
3	Mahmoud Khaldi (TUN)	3149
4	Stephane Bozzolo (FRA)	3111
5	Branimir Budetic (CRO)	3102
6	Abderrahim Zhiou (TUN)	3050
7	Ruslan Katyshev (UKR)	3027
8	Kurt Vanraefelghem (BEL)	2997
9	Antoine Perel (FRA)	2834
10	Jorg Trippen-Hilgers (GER)	2689
11	Goran Zezelj (CRO)	2400
12	Gabriel Potra (POR)	1733
13	Dimitrios Aziotis (GRE)	1628
14	Zhu Pengkai (CHN)	1209
15	Aliaksandr Tryputs (BLR)	0
