= Cycling at the 2022 Commonwealth Games – Men's tandem sprint B =

Men's tandem sprint B at the 2022 Commonwealth Games
- Venue: Lee Valley VeloPark
- Dates: 31 July
- Competitors: 14 from 6 nations

Medalists
gold medal	James Ball; Matt Rotherham	Wales
silver medal	Neil Fachie; Lewis Stewart	Scotland
bronze medal	Beau Wootton; Luke Zaccaria	Australia

The men's tandem sprint B at the 2022 Commonwealth Games is part of the cycling programme, and took place on 31 July 2022.

== Records ==
Prior to this competition, the existing world and Games records were as follows:

World record	Neil Fachie (GBR)	9.568	Brisbane, Australia	7 April 2018
Games record	Neil Fachie (SCO)	9.568	Brisbane, Australia	7 April 2018

== Schedule ==
The schedule is as follows:

All times are British Summer Time (UTC+1)

Date	Time	Round
Sunday 31 July 2022	10:42	Qualifying
Sunday 31 July 2022	11:25	Semifinals
Sunday 31 July 2022	15:02	Finals

== Results ==
=== Qualifying ===
Top 4 riders qualify for Semi-Finals.

Rank	Nation	Riders	Time	Behind	Average speed (km/h)	Notes
1	Scotland	Neil Fachie; Lewis Stewart (pilot)	9.807	—	73.417	Q
2	Wales	James Ball; Matt Rotherham (pilot)	9.851	+0.044	73.089	Q
3	Australia	Beau Wootton; Luke Zaccaria (pilot)	10.370	+0.563	69.431	Q
4	Wales	Alex Pope; Steffan Lloyd (pilot)	10.401	+0.594	69.224	Q
5	England	Stephen Bate; Christopher Latham (pilot)	10.614	+0.807	67.835	
6	Ghana	Frederick Assor; Rudolf Mensah (pilot)	13.186	+3.379	54.603	
7	Kenya	Kennedy Ogada; Peter Njoki (pilot)	13.396	+3.589	53.747	

=== Semifinals ===
The winners race for the gold and silver medals. The losers race for third place.

Heat	Rank	Country	Riders	Race 1	Race 2	Decider	Notes
1	1	Scotland	Neil Fachie; Lewis Stewart (pilot)	won	won		QG
1	2	Wales	Alex Pope; Steffan Lloyd (pilot)	+0.230	+0.128		QB
2	1	Wales	James Ball; Matt Rotherham (pilot)	won	won		QG
2	2	Australia	Beau Wootton; Luke Zaccaria (pilot)	+0.333	+0.145		QB

=== Finals ===
The final classification is determined in the medal finals.

Rank	Country	Riders	Race 1	Race 2	Decider	Notes
Gold medal final
1st place, gold medalist(s)	Wales	James Ball; Matt Rotherham (pilot)	won	won		
2nd place, silver medalist(s)	Scotland	Neil Fachie; Lewis Stewart (pilot)	+0.009	+0.122		
Bronze medal final
3rd place, bronze medalist(s)	Australia	Beau Wootton; Luke Zaccaria (pilot)	won	won		
4	Wales	Alex Pope; Steffan Lloyd (pilot)	+0.164	+0.387		
