= Cycling at the 2018 Commonwealth Games – Men's tandem 1 km time trial B =

2018 Commonwealth games Men's cycling event

Cycling Track – Men's tandem 1 km time trial B at the 2018 Commonwealth Games
- Venue: Anna Meares Velodrome
- Dates: 5 April
- Competitors: 5 from 5 nations
- Winning time: 1:00.065

Medalists
gold medal	Neil Fachie; Matt Rotherham (pilot)	Scotland
silver medal	James Ball; Peter Mitchell (pilot)	Wales
bronze medal	Brad Henderson; Tom Clarke (pilot)	Australia

The Men's tandem 1 km time trial B at the 2018 Commonwealth Games, was part of the cycling programme, which took place on 5 April 2018. This event was for blind and visually impaired cyclists riding with a sighted pilot.

== Records ==
Prior to this competition, the existing world and Games records were as follows:

World record	Neil Fachie (GBR)	59.460	Aguascalientes, Mexico	11 April 2014
Games record	Neil Fachie (SCO)	1:02.096	Glasgow, Scotland	25 July 2014

== Schedule ==
The schedule is as follows:

All times are Australian Eastern Standard Time (UTC+10)

Date	Time	Round
Thursday 5 April 2018	19:06	Final

== Results ==
Rank	Nation	Riders	Time	Behind	Average speed (km/h)	Notes
1st place, gold medalist(s)	Scotland	Neil Fachie; Matt Rotherham (pilot)	1:00.065	–	59.935	GR
2nd place, silver medalist(s)	Wales	James Ball; Peter Mitchell (pilot)	1:00.900	+0.835	59.113	
3rd place, bronze medalist(s)	Australia	Brad Henderson; Tom Clarke (pilot)	1:01.512	+1.447	58.525	
4	Malaysia	Muhammad Afiq Afify Rizan; Muhammad Khairul Adha Rasol (pilot)	1:03.249	+3.184	56.918	
5	Ghana	Frederick Assor; Rudolf Mensah (pilot)	1:26.002	+25.937	41.859	
