= Cycling at the 2018 Commonwealth Games – Men's tandem sprint B =

Cycling programme at the Commonwealth Games

Cycling Track – Men's tandem sprint B at the 2018 Commonwealth Games
- Venue: Anna Meares Velodrome
- Dates: 7 April
- Competitors: 5 from 5 nations

Medalists
gold medal	Neil Fachie; Matt Rotherham (pilot)	Scotland
silver medal	James Ball; Peter Mitchell (pilot)	Wales
bronze medal	Brad Henderson; Tom Clarke (pilot)	Australia

The Men's tandem sprint B at the 2018 Commonwealth Games was part of the cycling programme, taking place on 7 April 2018. This event was for blind and visually impaired cyclists riding with a sighted pilot.

== Records ==
Prior to this competition, the existing world and Games records were as follows:

World record	Neil Fachie (GBR)	9.711	Aguascalientes, Mexico	13 April 2014
Games record	Kieran Modra (AUS)	10.050	Glasgow, Scotland	26 July 2014

== Schedule ==
The schedule was as follows:

All times are Australian Eastern Standard Time (UTC+10)

Date	Time	Round
Saturday 7 April 2018	14:08	Qualifying
Saturday 7 April 2018	14:47	Semifinals
Saturday 7 April 2018	18:32/18:35	Finals

== Results ==
=== Qualifying ===
4 riders will be qualified and seeded for the semifinals according to their times in qualification.

Rank	Nations	Riders	Time	Behind	Average speed (km/h)	Notes
1	Scotland	Neil Fachie; Matt Rotherham (pilot)	9.568	—	75.251	Q, WR, GR
2	Wales	James Ball; Peter Mitchell (pilot)	10.022	+0.454	71.842	Q
3	Malaysia	Muhammad Afiq Afify Rizan; Muhammad Khairul Adha Rasol (pilot)	10.037	+0.469	71.735	Q
4	Australia	Brad Henderson; Tom Clarke (pilot)	10.124	+0.556	71.118	Q
5	Ghana	Frederick Assor; Rudolf Mensah (pilot)	12.816	+3.248	56.180	

=== Semifinals ===
Matches are extended to a best-of-three format hereon. Winners proceed to the gold medal final; losers proceed to the bronze medal final.

Heat	Rank	Nations	Riders	Race 1	Race 2	Decider (i.r.)	Notes
1	1	Scotland	Neil Fachie; Matt Rotherham (pilot)	X	X		QG
1	2	Australia	Brad Henderson; Tom Clarke (pilot)	+0.144	+1.625		QB
2	1	Wales	James Ball; Peter Mitchell (pilot)	X	X		QG
2	2	Malaysia	Muhammad Afiq Afify Rizan; Muhammad Khairul Adha Rasol (pilot)	+0.276	+0.273		QB

=== Finals ===
The final classification is determined in the medal finals.

Rank	Nations	Riders	Race 1	Race 2	Decider (i.r.)
Bronze medal final
3rd place, bronze medalist(s)	Australia	Brad Henderson; Tom Clarke (pilot)	X	X	
4	Malaysia	Muhammad Afiq Afify Rizan; Muhammad Khairul Adha Rasol (pilot)	+0.034	+1.459	
Gold medal final
1st place, gold medalist(s)	Scotland	Neil Fachie; Matt Rotherham (pilot)	X	X	
2nd place, silver medalist(s)	Wales	James Ball; Peter Mitchell (pilot)	+0.147	+0.361	
