= Mahmoud Khaldi =

Tunisian Paralympic athlete

Medal record

Men's para athletics

Representing Tunisia

Paralympic Games
Gold medal – first place	2012 London	400m – T12
Bronze medal – third place	2008 Beijing	Pentathlon – P12

All-Africa Games
Silver medal – second place	2011 Maputo	400m T12

Mahmoud Khaldi is a Paralympian athlete from Tunisia competing mainly in category P12 pentathlon events.

He competed in the 2008 Summer Paralympics in Beijing, China. There he won a bronze medal in the men's Pentathlon – P12 event and went out in the quarter-finals of the men's 400 metres – T12 event

== Athletics ==
Men's 200m – T12

Men's 400m – T12
