= Peter Mitchell (cyclist) =

English cyclist (born 1990)

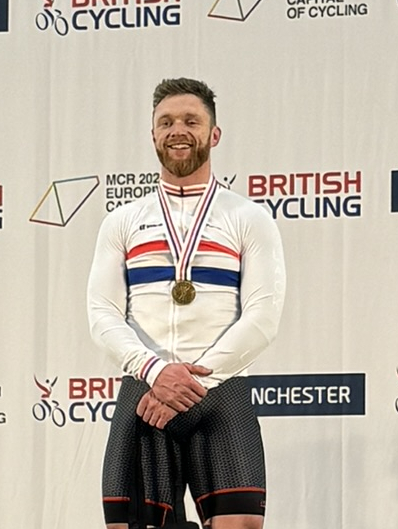

Personal information
- Full name: Peter Mitchell
- Born: 12 January 1990 (age 36) England; United Kingdom

Cycling career
- Sport: Cycling
- Discipline: Track
- Role: Rider
- Rider type: Sprint

Professional team
- 2009–present: Sky+ HD
Medal record
Men's Para-cycling
Representing Great Britain
Paralympic Games
Silver medal – second place	2016 Rio de Janeiro	Tandem B kilo
Track World Championships
Gold medal – first place	2014 Aguascalientes	Tandem B kilo
Gold medal – first place	2014 Aguascalientes	Tandem B sprint
Gold medal – first place	2015 Apeldoorn	Tandem B kilo
Gold medal – first place	2015 Apeldoorn	Tandem B sprint
Gold medal – first place	2016 Montichiari	Tandem B kilo
Gold medal – first place	2016 Montichiari	Tandem B sprint
Silver medal – second place	2018 Rio de Janeiro	Tandem B kilo
Bronze medal – third place	2018 Rio de Janeiro	Tandem B sprint
Representing Wales
Commonwealth Games
Silver medal – second place	2018 Gold Coast	Tandem B kilo
Silver medal – second place	2018 Gold Coast	Tandem B sprint

Peter Mitchell (born 12 January 1990 in London, England) is a British track cyclist, specialising in the individual and team sprints. In 2009, he was named in the Team Sky+ HD track cycling team alongside names such as Chris Hoy and Victoria Pendelton.

In November 2012 it was announced that Mitchell was joining the British paralympic cycling squad as a pilot for the tandem events. Mitchell teamed up with Paralympic gold medallist and multiple world champion Neil Fachie for the 2013 British National Track Championships, where they were second in both the kilo time trial and the 200-metre flying start time trial for mixed blind/visually impaired competitors. In addition he scored a solo second place in the sprint, being defeated in the final by Jason Kenny.

Fachie and Mitchell continued their partnership for the 2014 UCI Para-cycling Track World Championships in Aguascalientes, Mexico. The pair won the gold medal in the tandem 1km time trial, and broke the world record set by Fachie and Barney Storey at the 2012 Paralympics by setting a time of 59.460 seconds, becoming the first tandem pairing to clock a sub-minute time for the kilo time trial. They subsequently won a second gold in the tandem sprint.

He returned to able-bodied track cycling at the 2024 British Cycling National Track Championships and won the national sprint title.

Born in England, at Commonwealth Games level he has represented Wales as a para-cycling pilot, winning two medals in 2018 and Scotland as a sprint cyclist, where he was selected for the 2026 Games.

== Results ==
2007
1st Team Sprint, Junior World Track Championships
3rd Sprint, Junior World Track Championships
2nd Sprint, British National Junior Track Championships
2008
2nd Team Sprint, European Junior Track Championships
3rd Sprint, European Junior Track Championships
2009
2nd Team Sprint, European Under 23 Track Championships
2nd Team Sprint, British National Track Championships
2010
3rd Sprint, European Under 23 Track Championships
2011
2nd Team Sprint, European Under 23 Track Championships
2013
2nd Sprint, British National track championships
2nd BVI Mixed 1km time trial, British National track championships (with Neil Fachie)
2nd BVI Mixed 200m flying start time trial, British National track championships (with Neil Fachie)
2014
1st BVI 1km time trial, UCI Para-cycling Track World Championships (with Neil Fachie)
1st BVI Sprint, UCI Para-cycling Track World Championships (with Neil Fachie)
2nd BVI Mixed 1km time trial, British National Track Championships (with Neil Fachie)
2nd BVI 200m flying start time trial, British National Track Championships (with Neil Fachie)
2015
1st Tandem B sprint, UCI Para-cycling Track World Championships (with Neil Fachie)
2nd BVI 200m mixed standing start time trial, British National Track Championships (with Neil Fachie)
2nd BVI 200m flying start time trial, British National Track Championships (with Helen Scott)
2nd British National Team Sprint Championships (with Matthew Roper and Thomas Scammell)
2024
1st Sprint 2024 British Cycling National Track Championships
2025
2nd Sprint, 2025 British Cycling National Track Championships
2nd Keirin, 2025 British Cycling National Track Championships
