= Cycling at the 2024 Summer Paralympics – Men's time trial B =

Men's time trial B at the XVII Paralympic Games
- Venue: Vélodrome National, Paris
- Dates: 1 September 2024
- Competitors: 22 from 9 nations
- Teams: 11
- Winning time: 58.964

Medalists
1st place, gold medalist(s)		James Ball; Pilot: Steffan Lloyd	Great Britain
2nd place, silver medalist(s)		Neil Fachie; Pilot: Matt Rotherham	Great Britain
3rd place, bronze medalist(s)		Thomas Ulbricht; Pilot: Robert Förstemann	Germany

The men's time trial class B track cycling event at the 2024 Summer Paralympics took place on 1 September 2024 in the Vélodrome National, Paris. This class is for the cyclist who is blind or has visual impairments, they will then ride with tandem bicycles together with a sighted cyclist (also known as the pilot). There will be 11 pairs from 9 different nations competing.

== Competition ==
The 11 pairs were placed into their own heats individually (1 heat including a single 1 pair) where they performed a qualifying time trial. The six fastest pairs qualified for the gold final.

The B classification is described as follows:

- Athletes who are blind or visually impaired. They compete using a two-person cycle known as a tandem, with a sighted "pilot" in the front seat. Under UCI rules, a professional cyclist must not be active for 12 months in any UCI professional tour (starting January 1 of the year) or be selected to any national team in a UCI-sanctioned championship, except Masters (over 40), in order to apply as a para-cycling pilot.

The gold and silver medalists from Tokyo returned. Neil Fachie, piloted by Matt Rotherham seeking a record third Paralympic title in the event in four appearances (having won silver in 2016), while James Ball, piloted by Steffan Lloyd sought to win his first. World bronze medalist, Thomas Ulbricht, piloted by German Olympic legend Robert Förstemann sought to become the first German tandem to win the event.

In a close event, the three pre-race favourites qualified for the final, led by the German Ulbricht. In the final, however, the two British teams asserted themselves, with James Ball, piloted by Steffan Lloyd, taking their first Paralympic Games victory in the event over veteran Neil Fachie, piloted by Matt Rotherham, winning his second silver to go with his two previous golds in the event. Ulbricht and Förstemann could not match the British teams, but did not leave empty-handed, as they hung on to win a deserved bronze medal.

In doing so, Förstemann became one of the few cyclists to win both an Olympic Games medal and a Paralympic Games medal, 12 years after winning bronze in the team sprint at London 2012.

== Schedule ==
All times are Central European Summer Time (UTC+2)

Date	Time	Round
1 September	11:00	Qualifying
1 September	13:51	Final

== Records ==
At the commencement of the event the following world and Paralympic Games records were in place:

Event	Record	Name	Nationality	Mark	Location	Date
Men's B 1000m Time Trial	W.R.	Neil Fachie; Pilot: Matthew Rotherham	Great Britain	58.038	Tokyo	28 August 2021
Men's B 1000m Time Trial	P.R.	Neil Fachie; Pilot: Matthew Rotherham	Great Britain	58.038	Tokyo	28 August 2021

== Results ==
=== Qualifying ===
Rank	Heat	Cyclists	Nation	Result	Notes
1	6	Thomas Ulbricht; Pilot: Robert Förstemann	Germany	59.480	Q
2	5	James Ball; Pilot: Steffan Lloyd	Great Britain	59.793	Q
3	5	Kane Perris; Pilot: Luke Zaccaria	Australia	1:00.374	Q
4	6	Neil Fachie; Pilot: Matt Rotherham	Great Britain	1:00.543	Q
5	4	Martin Gordon; Pilot: Eoin Mullen	Ireland	1:01.158	Q
6	3	Kazuhei Kimura; Pilot: Kiaki Miura	Japan	1:02.022	Q
7	4	Lorenzo Bernard; Pilot: Davide Plebani	Italy	1:03.744	
8	2	Branden Walton; Pilot: Spencer Seggebruch	United States	1:04.080	
9	3	Maximiliano Gómez; Pilot: Sebastián Tolosa	Argentina	1:05.022	
10	2	Damien Vereker; Pilot: Mitchell McLaughlin	Ireland	1:06.740	
11	1	Frederick Assor; Pilot: Rudolf Mensah	Ghana	1:24.722	

=== Final ===
Rank	Cyclists	Nation	Result	Notes
1st place, gold medalist(s)	James Ball; Pilot: Steffan Lloyd	Great Britain	58.964	
2nd place, silver medalist(s)	Neil Fachie; Pilot: Matt Rotherham	Great Britain	59.312	
3rd place, bronze medalist(s)	Thomas Ulbricht; Pilot: Robert Förstemann	Germany	59.862	
4	Kane Perris; Pilot: Luke Zaccaria	Australia	1:00.940	
5	Martin Gordon; Pilot: Eoin Mullen	Ireland	1:01.158	
6	Kazuhei Kimura; Pilot: Kiaki Miura	Japan	1:02.567	
