= Athletics at the 2026 Commonwealth Games – Men's shot put (F57) =

Men's shot put (F57) at the 2026 Commonwealth Games
- Venue: Scotstoun Stadium
- Dates: 1 August
- Winning points: 13.40

Medalists
gold medal	Soman Rana	India
silver medal	Shubham Juyal	India
bronze medal	Cedric Lekezo Azamdzi	Cameroon

The men's shot put (F57) at the 2026 Commonwealth Games, as part of the athletics programme, will place in the Scotstoun Stadium on the morning of 1 August 2026. The event will consist of a stand alone final. The men's F57 event is a new event in the Games, although women have competed in the classification previously.

== Schedule ==
The schedule is as follows:

Date	Time	Round
1 August 2026	20:45	Final

All times are British Summer Time (UTC+1)

== Qualification ==
Para athletic event qualification is regulated by a special system organised between Commonwealth Sport and the International Paralympic Committee. Each para athletic event allowed for eight quota places, or 10 in the case of throwing events. All but one quota in each event was available on the basis of the Commonwealth Para Rankings on 31 Match 2026, to a maximum of two per Commonwealth Games Association (CGA), with the remaining quota allocated by Bipartite invitation.

This list did not set a limit on entrants, as other athletes in the same classification, but qualified directly for another event, could enter the event in question, up to a maximum (combined quota, invitation and 'separate event' quota) of three per event per CGA.

== Results ==
=== Final ===
Rank	Name	#1	#2	#3	#4	#5	#6	Result	Notes
1st place, gold medalist(s)	Soman Rana (IND)	13.38	13.40	x	13.14	13.17	13.11	13.40	SB
2nd place, silver medalist(s)	Shubham Juyal (IND)	13.08	12.42	13.27	13.16	12.88	13.28	13.28	SB
3rd place, bronze medalist(s)	Cedric Lekezo Azamdzi (CMR)	11.90	12.57	12.22	x	r		12.57	SB
4	Nicolaas Strydom (RSA)	10.10	10.94	10.71	10.47	10.38	10.51	10.94	SB
5	Taz Nicholls (ENG)	10.19	10.42	10.54	10.42	9.88	10.39	10.54	SB
6	James Mangerere (KEN)	9.83	9.79	10.34	10.16	9.74	10.16	10.34	PB
7	Matt Shepherd (AUS)	10.29	10.29	9.99	10.20	10.07	10.02	10.29	AR, PB
8	Maitlan Knoke (CAN)	9.47	9.85	9.73	9.64	9.72	9.60	9.85	SB
9	Jerome Bunge (PNG)	9.05	8.73	x	8.74	8.80	x	9.05	PB
10	Cedric Bernard (MRI)	6.90	7.47	6.77	7.53	6.92	7.28	7.53	PB
