= Athletics at the 2026 Commonwealth Games – Men's 100 metres (T47) =

Men's 100 metres (T47) at the 2026 Commonwealth Games
- Venue: Scotstoun Stadium, Glasgow
- Dates: 29 July 2026
- Competitors: 8 from 7 nations
- Winning time: 10.71

Medalists
gold medal	Dilip Gavit	India
silver medal	Mohammed Basil	India
bronze medal	Kevin Santos	England

The men's 100 metres (T47) event at the 2026 Commonwealth Games, also referred to as the men's 100 metres T45-47 event, as part of the para-athletics programme, took place at the Scotstoun Stadium on 29 July 2026.

The event was open to ambulant male para-athletes in the T45, T46 and T47 classifications for para-athletes with an amputation or similar condition. This was the third edition of the event, first introduced in 2018.

== Records ==
Prior to this competition, the existing world and Games records were as follows:

Records T45
World record	Yohansson Nascimento (BRA)	10.94	London, United Kingdom	6 September 2012
RecordsT46/47
World record	Petrúcio Ferreira (BRA)	10.29	São Paulo, Brazil	31 March 2022

== Qualification ==
Para athletic event qualification is regulated by a special system organised between Commonwealth Sport and the International Paralympic Committee. Each para athletic event allowed for eight quota places, or 10 in the case of throwing events. All but one quota in each event was available on the basis of the Commonwealth Para Rankings on 31 Match 2026, to a maximum of two per Commonwealth Games Association (CGA), with the remaining quota allocated by Bipartite invitation.

This list did not set a limit on entrants, as other athletes in the same classification, but qualified directly for another event, could enter the event in question, up to a maximum (combined quota, invitation and 'separate event' quota) of three per event per CGA.

== Schedule ==
The schedule is as follows:

Date	Time	Round
29 July 2026	21:12	Final

All times are United Kingdom time (UTC+1)

== Results ==
=== Final ===
The final of the is scheduled for the evening session of 29 July 2026.

Place	Lane	Class	Athlete	Nation	Time	Notes
1st place, gold medalist(s)	7	T47	Dilip Gavit	India	10.71	GR, SB
2nd place, silver medalist(s)	5	T47	Mohammed Basil	India	10.83	SB
3rd place, bronze medalist(s)	3	T47	Kevin Santos	England	10.85	SB
4	6	T47	Jaydon Page	Australia	10.97	SB
5	1	T47	Hayford Addai	Ghana	10.99	PB
6	4	T47	Collen Mahlalela	South Africa	11.31	SB
7	8	T47	Jahmarley Richards	Jamaica	11.55	SB
	2	T46	Ifeanyi Christian	Nigeria	DNS	
					Wind: (+2.0 m/s)	
