= Branden Walton =

American para-cyclist (born 1998)

Personal information
- Nationality: American
- Born: February 18, 1998 (age 28)
- Home town: Livermore, California, U.S.

Sport
- Sport: Para-cycling
- Disability: Macular degeneration
- Disability class: B
Medal record
Men's para-cycling
Representing the United States
Track World Championships
Bronze medal – third place	2025 Rio de Janeiro	Individual pursuit B
Bronze medal – third place	2026 Apeldoorn	Individual pursuit B

Branden Walton (born February 18, 1998) is an American visually impaired para-cyclist and former para-athlete. He represented the United States at the 2024 Summer Paralympics.

== Early life ==
Walton attended Windsor High School where he ran cross country and track. He made the U.S. Para team for the world junior championships in 2017, and won a gold medal in the 800 meter and a silver medal in the 1,500 meters T13 events. He suffered a back injury in 2021, which ended his running career. His doctor then suggested swimming or cycling.

== Career ==
Walton represented the United States at the 2024 Summer Paralympics and placed sixth in the pursuit B and eighth in time trial B event. He competed at the 2025 UCI Para-cycling Track World Championships and won a bronze medal in the individual pursuit B event.

== Personal life ==
Walton was diagnosed with macular degeneration and rod-cone dystrophy at four years old.
