= Shubham Juyal =

Indian para-athlete

Personal information
- Nationality: Indian
- Born: 23 April 1996 (age 30)

Sport
- Sport: Para-athletics
- Disability class: F57
- Event: Shot put
Medal record
Men's para-athletics
Representing India
Commonwealth Games
Silver medal – second place	2026 Glasgow	Shot put F57

Shubham Juyal (born 23 April 1996) is an Indian para shot putter who competes in the F57 events. He won the silver medal in the men's F57 shot put event at the 2026 Commonwealth Games. He has also won gold medals at the 2025 India Open Para Athletics Championship and the 2026 World Para Athletics Grand Prix in New Delhi.

== Life and career ==
Shubham Juyal was born 23 April 1996. He is a Lance Naik in the Indian Army. He began formal training in shot put in June 2023, and competes in the men's F57 seated shot put event. He was recognised as an "Icon Player" by the Paralympic Committee of India.

In 2025, Juyal won the gold medal at the India Open Para Athletics Championship in Balewadi. He won a silver medal at the 2025 Khelo India Para Games and bronze medals at the 23rd National Para Athletics Championships and the National Para Games held in Goa. He won the bronze medal in the F57 shot put event at the International Grand Prix in Marrakesh. At the 2025 World Para Athletics Championships at New Delhi, he reached the final of the men's F57 shot put event and finished seventh with a personal best throw of 13.72 m (45.0 ft).

In March 2026, Juyal won the gold medal in the men's F57 shot put event at the World Para Athletics Grand Prix in New Delhi with a throw of 14.45 m (47.4 ft). He represented India at the 2026 Commonwealth Games in Glasgow. In the men's shot put F57 event, he recorded a best throw of 14.01 m (46.0 ft) to win the silver medal behind compatriot Soman Rana.
