= Cycling at the 2020 Summer Paralympics – Men's time trial B =

Women's individual pursuit B at the XVI Paralympic Games
- Venue: Izu Velodrome
- Dates: 28 August 2021
- Competitors: 10 from 9 nations
- Winning time: 58.038

Medalists
1st place, gold medalist(s)		Neil Fachie	Great Britain
2nd place, silver medalist(s)		James Ball	Great Britain
3rd place, bronze medalist(s)		Raphaël Beaugillet	France

The men's time trial (class B) track cycling event at the 2020 Summer Paralympics took place on 28 August 2021 at the Izu Velodrome, Japan. This event is for the cyclist who are blind or have visual impairments. Competitors ride tandem bicycles with a sighted cyclist, known as the pilot. A total of 10 pairs from 9 different nations participated in the event.

== Competition format ==
Each of the 10 pairs competed individually in their own heats, racing against the clock in a time trial format. The medals were awarded based on the fastest times: the gold medal went to the fastest pair, silver to the second-fastest, and bronze to the third-fastest. The race distance was 1,000 meters.

== Schedule ==
All times are Japan Standard Time (UTC+9)

Date	Time	Round
Thursday, 26 August	11:08	Finals

== Records ==
World Record	Neil Fachie (pilot: Matt Rotherham) (GBR)	59.278	Manchester, United Kingdom	25 January 2019
Paralympic Record	Tristan Bangma (pilot: Teun Mulder) (NED)	59.822	Rio de Janeiro, Brazil	11 September 2016

== Results ==
Rank	Heat	Nation	Cyclists	Result	Notes
1st place, gold medalist(s)	10	Great Britain	Neil Fachie piloted by Matt Rotherham	58.038	WR
2nd place, silver medalist(s)	9	Great Britain	James Ball piloted by Lewis Stewart	59.503	
3rd place, bronze medalist(s)	7	France	Raphaël Beaugillet piloted by François Pervis	1:00.472	
4	8	Germany	Kai Kruse piloted by Robert Förstemann	1:00.554	
5	6	Ireland	Martin Gordon piloted by Éamonn Byrne	1:01.545	
6	5	Spain	Adolfo Bellido Guerrero piloted by Eloy Teruel Rovira	1:04.061	
7	4	Argentina	Maximiliano Ramon Gomez piloted by Sebastián José Tolosa	1:05.178	
8	3	Singapore	Tee Wee Leong piloted by Ang Kee Meng	1:10.886	
9	2	Hungary	Róbert Ocelka piloted by Gergely Nagy	1:12.388	
10	1	Ghana	Frederick Assor piloted by Rudolf Mensah	1:24.618	
