= Mohammed Basil =

Indian para-athlete

Personal information
- Full name: Mohammed Basil Morssinganakath
- Nationality: Indian
- Born: 28 February 2005 (age 21) Veliyancode, Malappuram, Kerala, India

Sport
- Sport: Para-athletics
- Disability class: T47
- Event: 100 metres
Medal record
Men's para-athletics
Representing India
Asian Para Games
Silver medal – second place	2026 Aichi-Nagoya	100 m T47
Commonwealth Games
Silver medal – second place	2026 Glasgow	100 m T47

Mohammed Basil Morssinganakath (born 28 February 2005) is an Indian para-athlete who competes in the T47 classification in the 100 metres. He won the silver medal in the men's 100 metres T47 event at the 2026 Commonwealth Games.

== Early life ==
Mohammed Basil was born on 28 February 2005 in Veliyancode in Malappuram district, Kerala. He took up para-athletics at a young age and later joined the Sports Authority of India's National Centre of Excellence in Thiruvananthapuram, where he trained as a sprinter. He was born without a limb and competes in the T47 for athletes with upper limb impairment.

== Career ==
In June 2025, Basil won the gold medal in the men's 100 metres T47 event at the World Para Athletics Grand Prix in Paris. In February 2026, he established a new Asian record of 10.63 seconds in the men's 100 metres T47 at the Indian Open in Bengaluru.

He was part of the Indian contingent for the 2026 Commonwealth Games in Glasgow. In the men's 100 metres T47 final, he clocked 10.83 seconds to win the silver medal behind compatriot Dilip Gavit, who set a Commonwealth Games record. The result gave India a one-two finish in the event, the first such instance at the para-athletics events in the Commonwealth Games.
