= Ruslan Katyshev =

Ukrainian Paralympic athlete (born 1983)

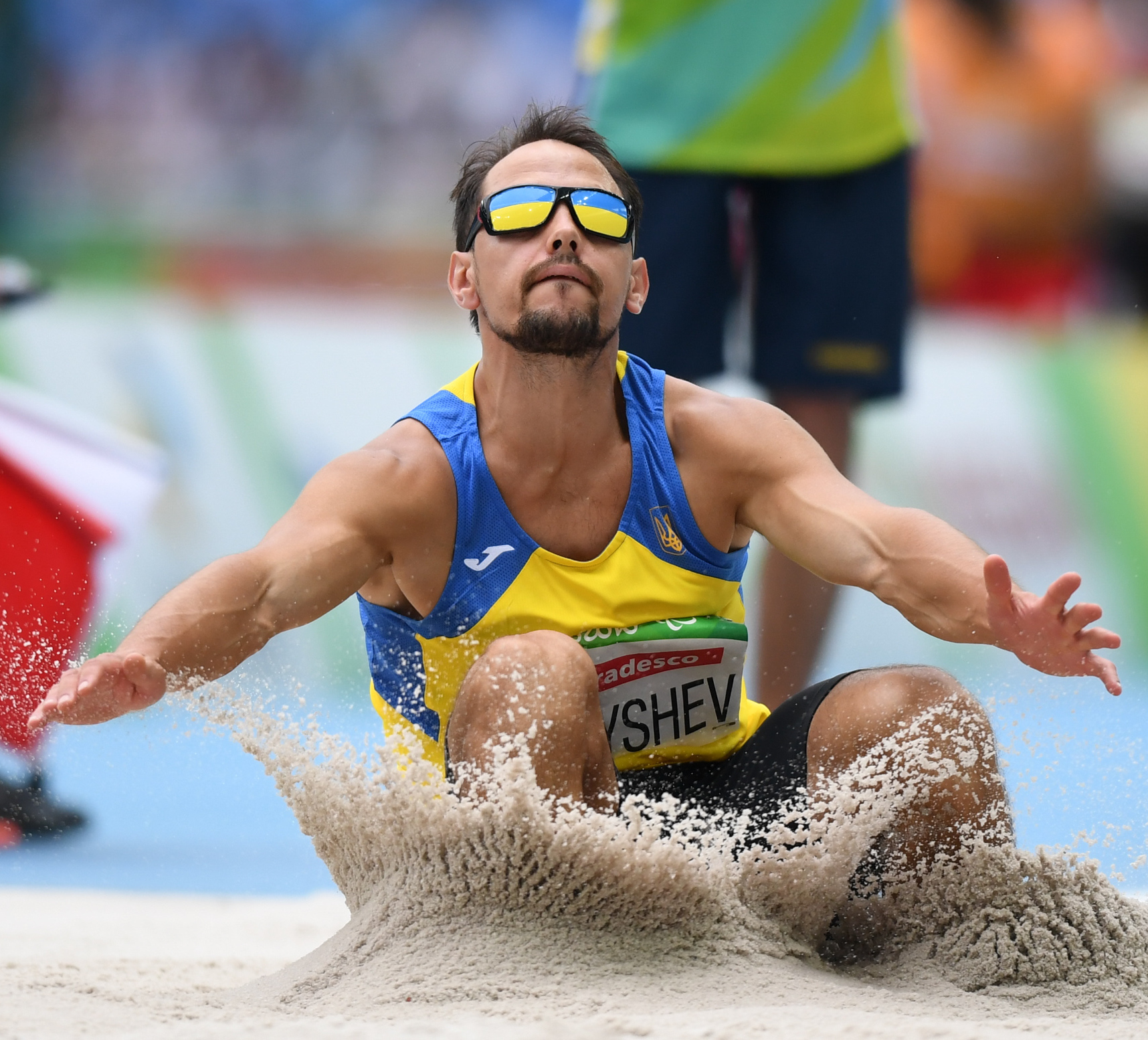
- Katyshev at the 2016 Summer Olympics

Personal information
- Nationality: Ukrainian
- Born: 18 April 1983 (age 43) Odessa, Ukraine
- Height: 175 cm (5 ft 9 in)
- Weight: 73 kg (161 lb)

Sport
- Country: Ukraine
- Sport: Athletics
- Disability class: T11/P11
- Club: Invasport: Odessa
- Coached by: Tatiana Orlova (personal); Andriy Fateev (national)
Medal record
Men's Paralympic athletics
Representing Ukraine
Paralympic Games
| Gold medal – first place | 2012 London | Long jump F11 |
| Bronze medal – third place | 2012 London | Triple jump F11 |
| Bronze medal – third place | 2016 Rio de Janeiro | Long jump F11 |
IPC World Championships
| Gold medal – first place | 2013 Lyon | Triple jump T11 |
| Silver medal – second place | 2017 London | Long jump T11 |
| Bronze medal – third place | 2015 Doha | Long jump T11 |
IPC European Championships
| Gold medal – first place | 2014 Swansea | Long jump T11 |
| Silver medal – second place | 2012 Stadskanaal | Long jump T11 |

Ruslan Katyshev (born 18 April 1983) is a visually impaired Ukrainian track and field athlete. In track and field Katyshev competes in the T11 classification long jump and triple jump events. He is also a P11 classification pentathlete. Katyshev has competed at two Summer Paralympic Games, winning a gold (long jump) and a bronze medal (triple jump) at the 2012 Games in London.
