= Dilip Gavit =

Indian para athlete

Personal information
- Full name: Dilip Mahadu Gavit
- Born: 21 April 2003 (age 23) Nashik, Maharashtra, India

Sport
- Sport: Paralympic athletics
- Disability class: T47
Medal record
Men's para-athletics
Representing India
Asian Para Games
Gold medal – first place	2022 Hangzhou	400 m T47
Gold medal – first place	2026 Aichi-Nagoya	100 m T47
Commonwealth Games
Gold medal – first place	2026 Glassgow	100 m T47

Dilip Mahadu Gavit (born 21 April 2003) is an Indian para-athlete competing in the T47 classification. He has the gold medal in the 400 m T47 race in the 2022 Asian Para Games and the 100 m T47 race in the 2026 Commonwealth Games. He also represented 2024 Summer Paralympics.

== Early life ==
Dilip Gavit was born on 21 April 2003, in Nashik in Maharashtra. When he was five years old, a fall from a tree resulted in an injury that led to his right arm being amputated from below the elbow. He did his schooling at Surgana, and is coached by Vaijanath Kale.

== Career ==
In the 2019 Khelo India Youth Games at Pune, Gavit was part of the Maharashtra team that won the bronze in the men's 4 × 400 m relay. He won the gold medal in the men's 400 m T47 race at the 2022 Asian Para Games at Hangzhou, China. In July 2023, he represented India at the 2023 World Para Athletics Championships where he earned a quota place for the 2024 Summer Paralympics. In July 2026, he won the gold medal in the 100 m T47 race in the 2026 Commonwealth Games at Glasgow, while setting a new Commonwealth Games record. With compatriot Mohammed Basil, winning the silver medal, the result gave India a one-two finish in the event, and the first such instance at the para-athletics events in the Commonwealth Games.
