= Stéphane Bozzolo =

French Paralympic athlete (born 1975)

Medal record

Men's para athletics

Representing France

Paralympic Games
Gold medal – first place	1996 Atlanta	Long jump F11
Gold medal – first place	2000 Sydney	Long jump F12
Silver medal – second place	1996 Atlanta	Pentathlon P11
Silver medal – second place	2000 Sydney	Pentathlon P12
Bronze medal – third place	2008 Beijing	4x100m - T11-13

Stéphane Bozzolo (born 2 May 1975 in Épinal) is a Paralympic athlete from France competing mainly in category P11 pentathlon events.

== Biography ==
He competed in the 1996 Summer Paralympics in Atlanta, United States. There he won a gold medal in the men's Long jump - F11 event, a silver medal in the men's Pentathlon - P11 event and finished fifth in the men's Triple jump - F11 event. He also competed at the 2000 Summer Paralympics in Sydney, Australia. There he won a gold medal in the men's Long jump - F12 event and a silver medal in the men's Pentathlon - P12 event. He also competed at the 2004 Summer Paralympics in Athens, Greece. There he finished eighth in the men's Javelin throw - F12 event, finished fifth in the men's Long jump - F12 event and did not finish in the men's Pentathlon - P12 event. He also competed in the 2008 Summer Paralympics in Beijing, China. There he won a bronze medal in the men's 4 x 100 metre relay - T11-13 event, finished seventh in the men's Long jump - F12 event and finished fourth in the men's Pentathlon - P12 event .
