= Thomas Ulbricht =

German Paralympic athlete

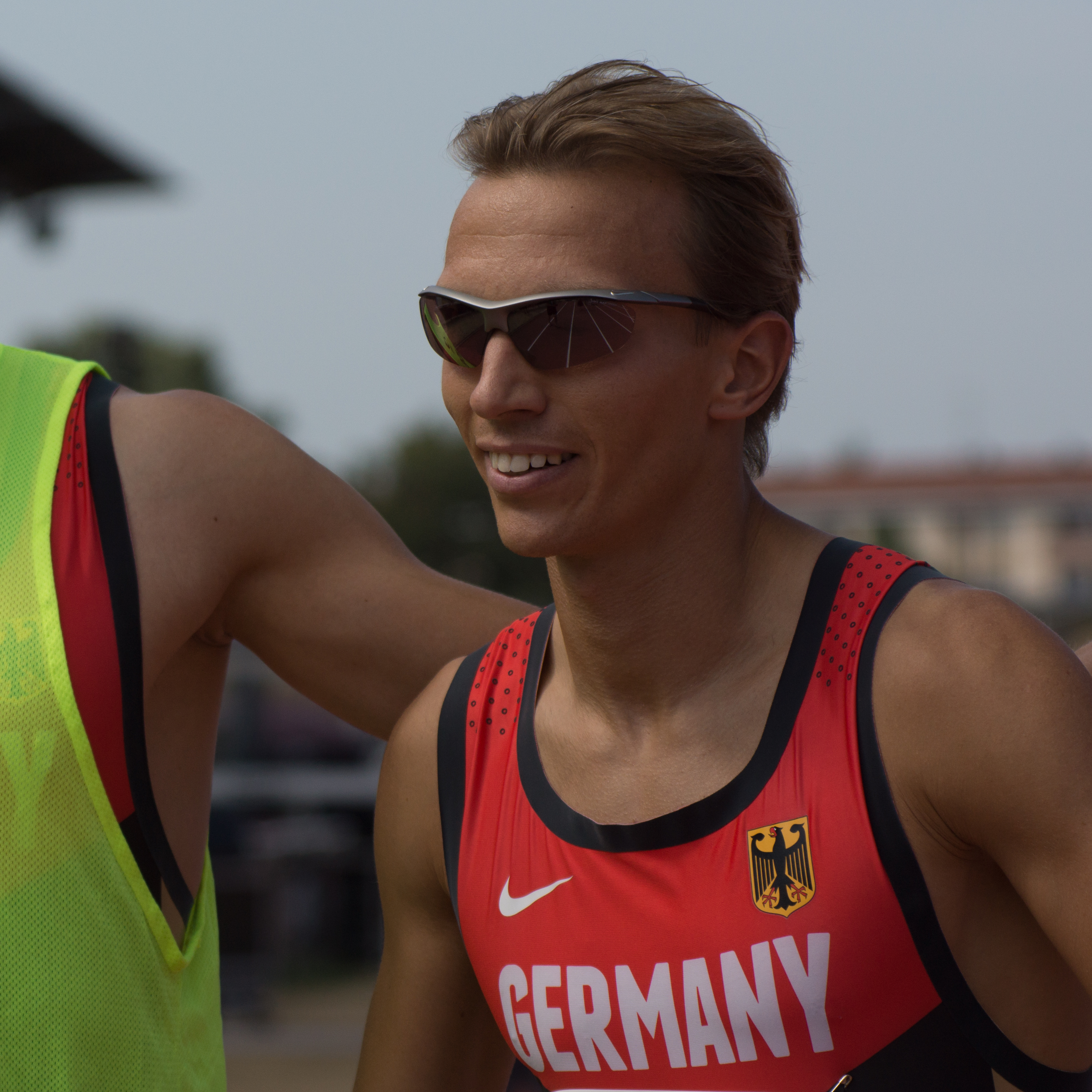
- Ulbricht at the 2013 IPC Athletics World Championships.

Personal information
- Born: 10 July 1985 (age 40)

Sport
- Country: Germany
- Sport: Para-athletics
- Disability class: T12
- Event(s): Para-cycling; Track and field
Medal record
Track and field
Representing Germany
Paralympic Games
| Silver medal – second place | 2008 Beijing | Pentathlon P12 |
European Championships
| Silver medal – second place | 2016 Grosseto | 200m T12 |
Men's Para-cycling
Paralympic Games
| Bronze medal – third place | 2024 Paris | Tandem B kilo |
Track World Championships
| Silver medal – second place | 2023 Glasgow | Tandem B sprint |
| Bronze medal – third place | 2022 Saint-Quentin-en-Yvelines | Tandem B kilo |
| Bronze medal – third place | 2023 Glasgow | Tandem B kilo |
| Bronze medal – third place | 2024 Rio de Janeiro | Tandem B kilo |

Thomas Ulbricht (born 10 July 1985) is a Paralympian athlete from Germany competing mainly in category P12 pentathlon and T12 sprint events.

== Career ==
He competed within the 2004 Summer Paralympics in Athens, Greece. There he finished fifth in the men's 400 metres - T12 event and went out in the first round of the men's 4 x 100 metre relay - T11-13 event. He also competed at the 2008 Summer Paralympics in Beijing, China, a silver medal in the men's Pentathlon - P12 event, went out in the first round of the men's 4 x 100 metre relay - T11-13 event, finished seventh in the men's Javelin throw - F11/12 event and finished tenth in the men's Long jump - F12 event
