= Beau Wootton =

Australian para-cyclist (born 1998)

Personal information
- Nationality: Australian
- Born: 13 August 1998 (age 28)

Sport
- Sport: Para-cycling
- Disability: Optic atrophy
- Disability class: B
Medal record
Men's para-cycling
Representing Australia
Track World Championships
Bronze medal – third place	2026 Apeldoorn	Tandem B kilo
Bronze medal – third place	2026 Apeldoorn	Tandem B sprint
Commonwealth Games
Bronze medal – third place	2022 Birmingham	Tandem B sprint

Beau Wootton (born 13 August 1998) is a visually impaired Australian para-cyclist.

== Career ==
Wootton represented Australia at the 2022 Commonwealth Games and won a bronze medal in the tandem B sprint, along with his pilot Luke Zaccaria.

In October 2026, he was selected to compete at the 2026 UCI Para-cycling Track World Championships, his first Para Track World Championships appearance since 2023. He won a bronze medal in tandem B kilo with a time of 1:01.709.

== Personal life ==
Wootton was born with optic atrophy.
