= Raphaël Beaugillet =

French Paralympic cyclist

Raphaël Beaugillet (born 17 September 1989) is a French Paralympic cyclist. He won bronze in the Men's time trial B in 2020.
