= Aaron Pope =

Scottish track cyclist (born 1999)

Personal information
- Nationality: Scottish
- Born: 10 December 1999 (age 26)

Sport
- Sport: Track cycling
- Disability class: B
Medal record
Men's para-cycling
Representing United Kingdom
Track World Championships
Gold medal – first place	2026 Apeldoorn	Tandem B kilo
Gold medal – first place	2026 Apeldoorn	Tandem B sprint
Gold medal – first place	2026 Apeldoorn	Mixed team sprint B
Representing Scotland
Commonwealth Games
Gold medal – first place	2026 Glasgow	Tandem B kilo
Gold medal – first place	2026 Glasgow	Tandem B sprint

Aaron Pope (born 12 October 1999) is a Scottish track cyclist who serves as the tandem pilot for James Ball.

== Career ==
Pope competed at the 2024 British Cycling National Track Championships and won a gold medal in the 1 km time trial.

He competed at the 2026 Commonwealth Games, serving as the pilot for Neil Fachie, and won gold medals in the tandem B kilo and tandem B sprint events. With Fachie retiring from elite racing following the 2026 Commonwealth Games, Pope subsequently became the pilot for James Ball. In October 2026 he competed at the 2026 UCI Para Cycling Track World Championships, serving as the new pilot for Ball, and won a gold medal in the tandem B kilo with a time of 59.563 seconds.
