= Steffan Lloyd =

Welsh para-cyclist (born 1998)

Personal information
- Nickname: Steff
- Nationality: Welsh
- Born: 23 October 1998 (age 27) Llandysul, Wales

Sport
- Sport: Track cycling
- Disability class: B
Medal record
Men's para-cycling
Representing Great Britain
Paralympic Games
Gold medal – first place	2024 Paris	Tandem B kilo
Track World Championships
Gold medal – first place	2022 Saint-Quentin-en-Yvelines	Mixed team sprint B
Gold medal – first place	2025 Rio de Janeiro	Tandem B kilo
Gold medal – first place	2025 Rio de Janeiro	Tandem B sprint
Silver medal – second place	2022 Saint-Quentin-en-Yvelines	Tandem B kilo
Silver medal – second place	2023 Glasgow	Tandem B kilo
Silver medal – second place	2024 Rio de Janeiro	Tandem B kilo
Bronze medal – third place	2022 Saint-Quentin-en-Yvelines	Tandem B sprint
Bronze medal – third place	2025 Rio de Janeiro	Mixed team sprint B

Steffan Lloyd (born 23 October 1998) is a Welsh track cyclist who serves as the tandem pilot for James Ball. He represented the United Kingdom at the 2024 Summer Paralympics.

== Career ==
Lloyd began cycling in 2019, and in 2021 was selected for the Welsh national team. He began his tandem career as a pilot for Alex Pope at the 2022 Commonwealth Games. They finished in fourth place in the tandem sprint B event. He was then selected by the Great Britain Cycling Team to pilot James Ball. They made their tandem debut together at the 2022 UCI Para-cycling Track World Championships and won a gold medal in the mixed team sprint, a silver medal in the 1 km time trial, and a bronze medal in the sprint B events. The tandem again competed at the 2023 UCI Para-cycling Track World Championships and won a silver medal in the 1 km time trial event.

In February 2024, he competed at the 2024 British Cycling National Track Championships and won a gold medal in the sprint B event, and a silver medal in the 1 km time trial B event. In March 2024, he competed at the 2024 UCI Para-cycling Track World Championships and won a silver medal in the 1 km time trial B event, with a time of 1:00.448. In September 2024, he represented the United Kingdom at the 2024 Summer Paralympics and served as the pilot for Ball and won a gold medal in the time trial B event, with a tieme of 58.964.

In October 2025, he competed at the 2025 UCI Para-cycling Track World Championships and won gold medals in the sprint and 1 km time trial B events. He also won a bronze medal in the mixed team sprint B event.
