= Soman Rana =

Indian para athlete (born 1983)

Personal information
- Born: 16 January 1983 (age 43) Bihar, India

Sport
- Sport: Para-athletics
- Disability class: F57
- Event: Shot put
Medal record
Men's para-athletics
Representing India
World Championships
Bronze medal – third place	2025 New Delhi	Shot put F57
Asian Para Games
Silver medal – second place	2022 Hangzhou	Shot put F57
Commonwealth Games
Gold medal – first place	2026 Glasgow	Shot put F57

Soman Rana (16 January 1983) is an Indian para shot putter who competes in the F57 event. He won the gold medal in the shot put F57 event at the 2026 Commonwealth Games. He has represented India at the 2020 and 2024 Summer Paralympics, finishing fourth and fifth, respectively.

== Early life ==
Soman Rana is from Bihar. He is Havildar in the Indian Army, and trains at Army Paralympic Node at BEG and Centre, Kirkee, Pune. He lost his right leg in a mine blast in December 2006.

== Career ==
In 2019, Rana competed in the men's shot put F56/57 in Dubai at the 2019 World Para Athletics Championships. In 2021, he won a gold at the World Para Athletics Grand Prix at Tunis. He represented India at the 2020 and finished fourth in the shot put F57 event. He won the silver medal in the shot put F57 event at the 2022 Asian Para Games at Hangzhou.

Rana competed at the 2023 World Para Athletics Championships in July 2023, and earned a quota place for the 2024 Summer Paralympics. He finished fifth in the shot put F57 event at the 2024 Summer Paralympics. In February 2025, he won the gold medal at the National Para Athletics Championships at the Jawaharlal Nehru Stadium in Chennai with a throw of 14.42 m (47.3 ft). He finished ahead of Hokato Hotozhe Sema, who had won the bronze medal in the F57 category in the 2024 Summer Paralympics.

In the 2026 Commonwealth Games, Rana won the gold medal in the shot put F57 event with a best throw of 13.4 m (44 ft).
