= Alex Pope =

Australian rugby union international

- Full name: Alexander Murray Pope
- Born: 3 June 1944 (age 82) Brisbane, Australia
- School: Marist College Ashgrove

Rugby union career
- Position: Centre
International career
Years	Team	Apps	(Points)
1968	Australia	1	(0)

Alexander Murray Pope (born 3 June 1944) is an Australian former rugby union international.

Pope was born in Brisbane and attended Marist College Ashgrove.

A centre, Pope was capped once for the Wallabies during his career, playing against the All Blacks at Ballymore Stadium, Brisbane in 1968, which was lost in controversial circumstances. He played in three first-grade premierships with Brisbane club Brothers and in 1971 had the distinction of captaining Queensland.

Pope turned to acting in the late 1970s, with roles on screen and stage, including musicals. He is a close friend of actor and former rugby teammate Ray Meagher and was a guest on Meagher's 2022 episode of This is Your Life.

== See also ==
- List of Australia national rugby union players
