= Rudolf Mensah =

Ghanaian footballer

Personal information
- Full name: Rudolf Nana Kwasi Mensah Jr.
- Date of birth: 20 May 2001 (age 25)
- Place of birth: Accra, Ghana
- Height: 1.85 m (6 ft 1 in)
- Position: Forward

Team information
- Current team: Swedru All Blacks
- Number: 11

Youth career
- Liberty Professionals

Senior career*
| Years | Team | Apps | (Gls) |
| 2020 | Liberty Professionals | 2 | (1) |
| 2020 | Birmingham Legion | 4 | (0) |
| 2021–2022 | Liberty Professionals | | |
| 2022– | Golden Kick | | |
- * Club domestic league appearances and goals as of 27 January 2025

Rudolf Nana Kwasi Mensah Jr. nicknamed “the emergency striker”(born 15 May 2001), is a Ghanaian professional footballer who plays as a forward for Agona Swedru All Blacks in the Ghana Premier League.

== Career ==
In 2020, Mensah made two appearances and scored a single goal for Liberty Professionals before transferring to USL Championship side Birmingham Legion on 4 February 2020. He made his debut for Birmingham on 15 July 2020, appearing as a 71st-minute substitute in a 3–0 win over Memphis 901.
