= Neil Fachie =

Scottish Paralympic multiple sports athlete

Neil Fachie OBE
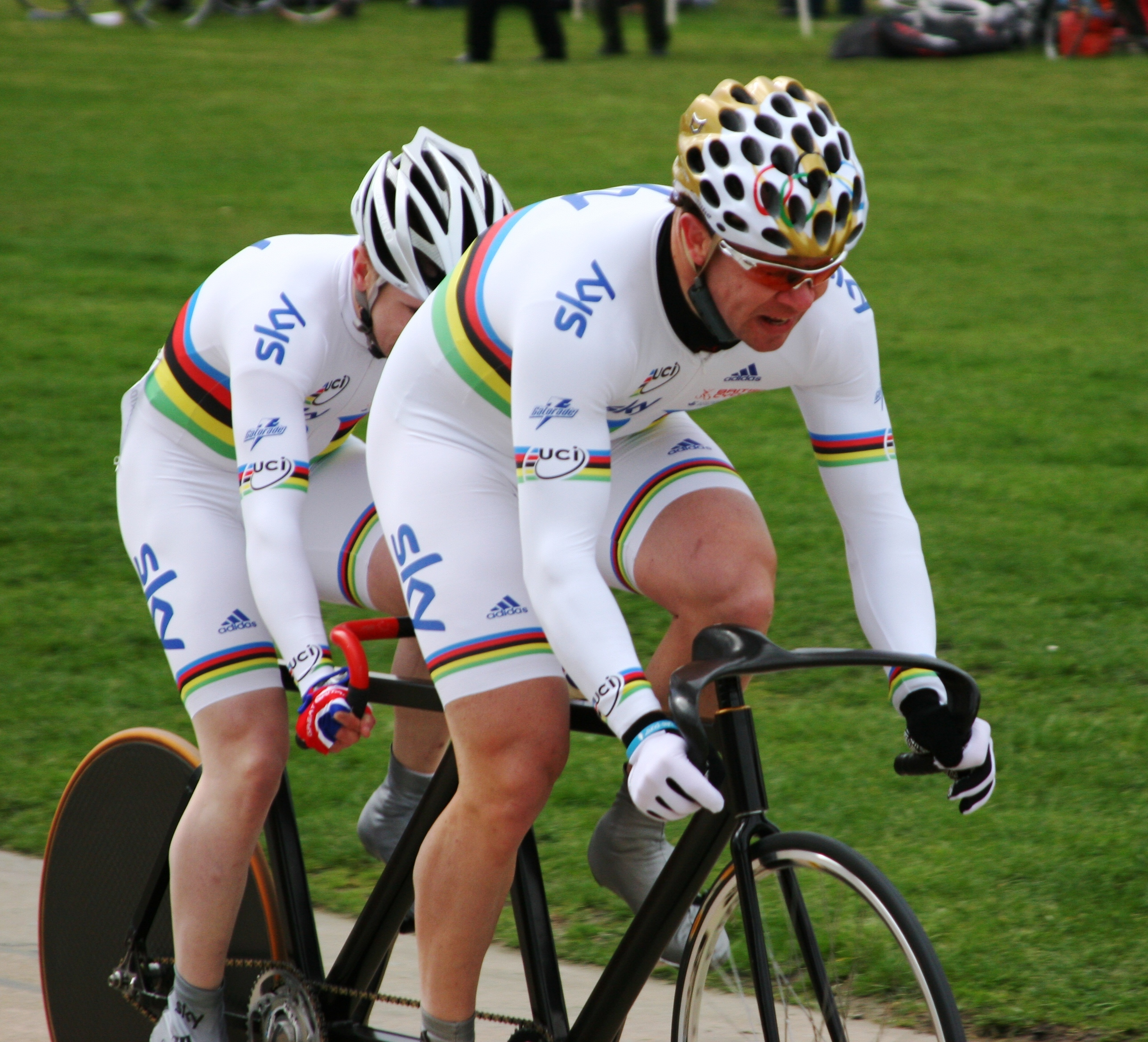
- Barney Storey and Neil Fachie, 2010

Personal information
- Full name: Neil Fachie
- Born: 12 March 1984 (age 42) Aberdeen, Scotland
- Education: University of Aberdeen

Sport
- Country: United Kingdom; Scotland
- Sport: Athletics; Cycling

Achievements and titles
- Paralympic finals: 2008; 2012
Medal record
Men's para cycling
Representing Great Britain
Paralympic Games
Gold medal – first place	2012 London	Tandem B kilo
Silver medal – second place	2012 London	Tandem B sprint
Silver medal – second place	2016 Rio de Janeiro	Tandem B kilo
Silver medal – second place	2024 Paris	Tandem B kilo
Track World Championships
Gold medal – first place	2009 Manchester	Tandem B kilo
Gold medal – first place	2009 Manchester	Tandem B sprint
Gold medal – first place	2011 Montichiari	Tandem B kilo
Gold medal – first place	2011 Montichiari	Tandem B sprint
Gold medal – first place	2014 Aguascalientes	Tandem B kilo
Gold medal – first place	2014 Aguascalientes	Tandem B sprint
Gold medal – first place	2015 Apeldoorn	Tandem B kilo
Gold medal – first place	2015 Apeldoorn	Tandem B sprint
Gold medal – first place	2016 Montichiari	Tandem B kilo
Gold medal – first place	2016 Montichiari	Tandem B sprint
Gold medal – first place	2018 Rio de Janeiro	Tandem B kilo
Gold medal – first place	2018 Rio de Janeiro	Tandem B sprint
Gold medal – first place	2019 Apeldoorn	Tandem B sprint
Gold medal – first place	2020 Milton	Tandem B kilo
Gold medal – first place	2022 Saint-Quentin-en-Yvelines	Tandem B kilo
Gold medal – first place	2023 Glasgow	Tandem B kilo
Gold medal – first place	2023 Glasgow	Tandem B sprint
Gold medal – first place	2023 Glasgow	Tandem B team sprint
Gold medal – first place	2024 Rio de Janeiro	Tandem B kilo
Silver medal – second place	2012 Los Angeles	Tandem B kilo
Silver medal – second place	2017 Los Angeles	Tandem B kilo
Silver medal – second place	2017 Los Angeles	Tandem B sprint
Silver medal – second place	2019 Apeldoorn	Tandem B kilo
Silver medal – second place	2020 Milton	Tandem B sprint
Silver medal – second place	2024 Rio de Janeiro	Tandem B team sprint
Representing Scotland
Commonwealth Games
Gold medal – first place	2014 Glasgow	Tandem B kilo
Gold medal – first place	2014 Glasgow	Tandem B sprint
Gold medal – first place	2018 Gold Coast	Tandem B kilo
Gold medal – first place	2018 Gold Coast	Tandem B sprint
Gold medal – first place	2022 Birmingham	Tandem B kilo
Gold medal – first place	2026 Glasgow	Tandem B kilo
Gold medal – first place	2026 Glasgow	Tandem B sprint
Silver medal – second place	2022 Birmingham	Tandem sprint B

Neil Michael Fachie (born 12 March 1984) is a former Scottish cyclist and track athlete, competing in events for people with a visual impairment. Fachie has competed in two Paralympics, as a sprinter in the 2008 Games in Beijing and as a tandem cyclist at the 2012 Summer Paralympics. In London he won the gold medal in the Men's individual 1 km time trial and silver in the individual sprint, both with Barney Storey as his sighted pilot. Outside of the Paralympic Games, Fachie is a nineteen-time world champion and seven-time Commonwealth Games champion, creating tandem partnerships with Barney Storey, Pete Mitchell, and Olympians Craig MacLean and Matt Rotherham.

== Career history ==
Fachie was born in Aberdeen, Scotland in 1984. Fachie, who has a congenital eye condition, retinitis pigmentosa, studied physics at Aberdeen University. There he took up athletics and at the age of 24 he qualified for the 2008 Summer Paralympics in Beijing, running in the 100m and 200m sprints. After failing to take a podium place in either races in China, Fachie decided to change sports to cycling.

The strength Fachie had built up during his time as a sprinter was instrumental in impressing the Great Britain cycle coaches. By September 2008 he was training with the GB Para-Cycling Team and was part of the team by April the following year. In 2009 he entered the Para-Cycling Track World Championships, with Barney Storey as his pilot. The two took the Gold in both the Kilo and Sprint, setting a new world record in the Kilo. In 2011 Fachie travelled to Montichiari, Italy to compete in his second Para-Cycling Track World Championships. This time paired with Craig MacLean, he again achieved gold in both the Kilo and Sprint, setting a new world record in the Sprint.

Fachie entered his third Para-Cycling Track World Championships, this time held in Los Angeles, USA. His pilot in America again was Storey, who would team up with Fachie at the 2012 Summer Paralympics in London. The pair took the silver in the Kilo. That year, in the Paralympics, Fachie and Storey competed in the Men's 1 km time trial for riders with a visual impairment. The pair set a world record time of 1:01.351, and after team mates and main rivals Anthony Kappes and Craig MacLean suffered a mechanical failure, took the gold medal.

Fachie was appointed Member of the Order of the British Empire (MBE) in the 2013 New Year Honours for services to para-cycling. In June 2013, he was awarded an honorary degree from the University of Aberdeen by the Duchess of Rothesay.

Fachie teamed up with Pete Mitchell for the 2014 UCI Para-cycling Track World Championships in Aguascalientes, Mexico. The pair won the gold medal in the tandem 1km time trial, and broke the world record set by Fachie and Storey at the 2012 Paralympics by setting a time of 59.460 seconds, becoming the first tandem pairing to clock a sub-minute time for the kilo time trial. They subsequently won a second gold in the tandem sprint.

Fachie reunited with Craig MacLean for the 2014 Commonwealth Games in Glasgow, where the pairing won double gold in the kilo time trial and sprint B tandem.

Fachie, piloted by Matt Rotherham, successfully defended his kilo time trial and sprint B tandem titles at the 2018 Commonwealth Games in the Gold Coast, Australia. In doing so he equaled the record for the most number of Commonwealth Gold medals. He shares the record of 4 golds with sprinter Allan Wells and lawn bowler Alex Marshall.

At the 2020 Tokyo Paralympics, Fachie won gold in the men's time trial B alongside Rotherham.

He was appointed Officer of the Order of the British Empire (OBE) in the 2022 Birthday Honours for services to cycling.

In 2022 Neil Fachie won Scotland's first gold medal of the Commonwealth Games in the tandem 1 km time trial B event. He also won a silver medal in the tandem sprint B event.

He competed at the 2026 Commonwealth Games, along with new pilot Aaron Pope, and won gold medals in the tandem B kilo and tandem B sprint events. Following the 2026 Commonwealth Games, Fachie retired from elite racing, finishing his career as Scotland's most successful Commonwealth Games athlete with seven gold medals.

== Personal life ==
He is married to visually impaired English racing cyclist Lora Fachie.

== See also ==
- 2012 Olympics gold post boxes in the United Kingdom
