= Kane Perris =

Australian para-olympian cyclist

- Kane Perriss (2026)

Personal information
- Nationality: Australian
- Born: 12 May 1997 (age 29)

Sport
- Country: Australia
- Sport: Para-cycling
- Disability: Visual impairment
Medal record
Men's para-cycling
Representing Australia
Track World Championships
Gold medal – first place	2025 Rio de Janeiro	Mixed team sprint B
Silver medal – second place	2025 Rio de Janeiro	Tandem B kilo
Silver medal – second place	2025 Rio de Janeiro	Tandem B sprint
Silver medal – second place	2026 Apeldoorn	Tandem B sprint
Commonwealth Games
Bronze medal – third place	2026 Glasgow	Tandem B kilo

Kane Perris (born 12 May 1997) is a legally blind Australian para cyclist. He competed at the 2024 Paris Paralympics.

== Personal ==
Perris was born with albinism and its associated vision loss. He works as a Therapy Assistant at VisAbility. He is the younger brother of Australian Paralympic track sprinter Chad Perris.

== Cycling ==
Perris cycling career started as the result of 2020 talent identification program undertaken by the Western Australian Institute of Sport. His cycling career was derailed for ten months in 2021 due to a serious injury. At the 2024 Para National Championships, Perris with pilot Luke Zaccaria set a national record in the team sprint and achieved a World Championship and Paralympic qualifying time in the 1km time trial. He competed at the 2024 UCI Para-cycling Track World Championships in Rio de Janeiro, Brazil.

At the 2024 Paris Paralympics, he finished fourth in the Men's 1 km time trial B and fourteenth in the Men's individual pursuit B.

At the 2025 UCI Para-cycling Track World Championships in Rio de Janeiro, Brazil, he won the gold medal in the Mixed Team Sprint B and silver medals with pilot Luke Zaccaria in the Men's Tandem Sprint B and Men's Tandem Kilo B.

Perris with his pilot Luke Zaccaria featured in Changing Track - a documentary on the Australian Paralympic Cycling team in the lead up to the 2024 Paris Paralympics.
