= Matt Rotherham =

British cyclist (born 1994)

Matthew Rotherham MBE
Personal information
- Born: 7 December 1994 (age 31) Bolton, England
- Height: 5 ft 8 in (173 cm)

Cycling career
- Sport: Cycling
- Current team: ESV Manchester
- Discipline: Track Sprint
- Role: Rider
- Rider type: Sprinter
Medal record
Men's para cycling
Representing Great Britain
Paralympic Games
Gold medal – first place	2020 Tokyo	Tandem B kilo
Silver medal – second place	2024 Paris	Tandem B kilo
Track World Championships
Gold medal – first place	2023 Glasgow	Tandem B kilo
Gold medal – first place	2023 Glasgow	Tandem B sprint
Representing Scotland
Commonwealth Games
Gold medal – first place	2018 Gold Coast	Tandem B sprint
Gold medal – first place	2018 Gold Coast	Tandem B kilo
Representing Wales
Commonwealth Games
Gold medal – first place	2022 Birmingham	Tandem B sprint
Silver medal – second place	2022 Birmingham	Tandem B kilo

Matthew Rotherham (born 7 December 1994) is a British male track cyclist. Following a career as an elite able bodied cyclist, he transferred to Paralympic track cycling as a sighted pilot in the visually impaired (B) classification. In 2021, he piloted Neil Fachie to Paralympic gold in the men's track time trial B classification. The pair are also Paralympic silver medallists in 2024, Commonwealth Games champions in 2018, and five-time World champions in the discipline.

== Cycling career ==
Rotherham is a five times British champion after winning the time trial Championship at the 2019 British National Track Championships and the 2022 British National Track Championships and three British National Tandem Sprint Championships gold medals.

He also piloted Neil Fachie of Scotland to gold medals at the 2018 Commonwealth Games in the tandem sprint B and tandem 1km time trial B. At the 2022 Commonwealth Games, he piloted James Ball of Wales to a gold medal in the tandem sprint B and a silver medal in the tandem 1km time trial B.

Rotherham was appointed Member of the Order of the British Empire (MBE) in the 2022 New Year Honours for services to cycling.
