= Luke Zaccaria =

Australian track cyclist (born 1993)

- Luke Zaccaria (2026)

Personal information
- Nationality: Australian
- Born: 3 February 1993 (age 33)
- Home town: Perth, Australia

Sport
- Sport: Track cycling
- Disability class: B
Medal record
Men's para-cycling
Representing Australia
Track World Championships
Gold medal – first place	2025 Rio de Janeiro	Mixed team sprint B
Silver medal – second place	2025 Rio de Janeiro	Tandem B kilo
Silver medal – second place	2025 Rio de Janeiro	Tandem B sprint
Silver medal – second place	2026 Apeldoorn	Tandem B sprint
Commonwealth Games
Bronze medal – third place	2022 Birmingham	Tandem B sprint
Bronze medal – third place	2026 Glasgow	Tandem B kilo

Luke Zaccaria (born 3 February 1993) is an Australian track cyclist who serves as the tandem pilot for Kane Perris. He represented Australia at the 2024 Summer Paralympics.

== Career ==
Zaccaria began his tandem career as a pilot for Brad Henderson. The tandem won three gold medals at the 2020 Australian Para-cycling Track National Championships. He also guided Henderson to a sixth place finish at the 2019 UCI Para-cycling Track World Championships. He then served as the pilot for Beau Wootton at the 2022 Commonwealth Games, and won a bronze medal in the tandem sprint B event.

In 2023 he became the pilot for Kane Perris. At the 2024 Para National Championships, the tandem set a national record in the team sprint and achieved a World Championship and Paralympic qualifying time in the 1 km time trial. In March 2024, he competed at the 2024 UCI Para-cycling Track World Championships. The tandem crashed on the opening day and Perris sustained a shoulder injury, three broken ribs and punctured lung. In September 2024, he represented Australia at the 2024 Summer Paralympics in the time trial B event. During qualification they set a national record time of 1:00.374 to qualify third fastest for the final. During the finals they finished in fourth place with a time of 1:00.940, finishing 1.1 seconds behind the bronze medal team from Geramy.

On 19 August 2025, he was selected to compete at the 2025 UCI Para-cycling Track World Championships. He won a gold medal in the mixed team sprint B event with a world record time of 49.288.

Zaccaria and Perris featured in Changing Track - a documentary on the Australian Paralympic Cycling team in the lead up to the 2024 Paris Paralympics.
