= James Ball (cyclist) =

Welsh Paralympic cyclist (born 1991)

Personal information
- Nationality: British
- Born: 24 June 1991 (age 35) Ponthir, Wales

Sport
- Country: Great Britain
- Sport: Para-cycling
- Disability class: B
Medal record
Men's Para-cycling
Representing Great Britain
Paralympic Games
Gold medal – first place	2024 Paris	Tandem B kilo
Silver medal – second place	2020 Tokyo	Tandem B kilo
Track World Championships
Gold medal – first place	2017 Los Angeles	Tandem B kilo
Gold medal – first place	2017 Los Angeles	Tandem B sprint
Gold medal – first place	2019 Apeldoorn	Tandem Kilo
Gold medal – first place	2020 Milton	Tandem sprint
Gold medal – first place	2022 Saint-Quentin-en-Yvelines	Tandem B sprint
Gold medal – first place	2025 Rio de Janeiro	Tandem B kilo
Gold medal – first place	2025 Rio de Janeiro	Tandem B sprint
Gold medal – first place	2026 Apeldoorn	Tandem B kilo
Gold medal – first place	2026 Apeldoorn	Tandem sprint
Gold medal – first place	2026 Apeldoorn	Mixed team sprint B
Silver medal – second place	2018 Rio de Janeiro	Tandem B kilo
Silver medal – second place	2019 Apeldoorn	Tandem Sprint
Silver medal – second place	2020 Milton	Tandem Kilo
Silver medal – second place	2022 Saint-Quentin-en-Yvelines	Tandem B kilo
Silver medal – second place	2023 Glasgow	Tandem B kilo
Silver medal – second place	2024 Rio de Janeiro	Tandem B kilo
Bronze medal – third place	2016 Montichiari	Tandem B sprint
Bronze medal – third place	2018 Rio de Janeiro	Tandem B Sprint
Bronze medal – third place	2025 Rio de Janeiro	Mixed team sprint B
Representing Wales
Commonwealth Games
Gold medal – first place	2022 Birmingham	Tandem B sprint
Silver medal – second place	2018 Gold Coast	Tandem B sprint
Silver medal – second place	2018 Gold Coast	Tandem B kilo
Silver medal – second place	2022 Birmingham	Tandem B kilo
Silver medal – second place	2026 Glasgow	Tandem B kilo

James Ball (born 24 June 1991) is a Welsh para-cyclist who competes in tandem races as an athlete with a visual impairment. Ball is a multiple world champion across the tandem sprint events. He won a gold medal at the 2024 Summer Paralympics in the tandem B kilo alongside his pilot Steffan Lloyd.

== Cycling career ==
Welshman Ball started his sporting career as a swimmer, before moving to athletics. The visually impaired athlete was in line to earn selection in track and field for ParalympicsGB at London 2012, however suffered an injury which ended those aspirations.

On his journey back to full fitness, Ball took part in turbo testing arranged by British Cycling, and his potential on a bike was discovered.

Paired with pilot Craig McLean, Ball took a bronze medal away from his first world championships, in 2016. Paralympic selection – and fifth place in the kilo – followed, before a golden 2017 saw Ball and Matt Rotherham win a sprint double at the world championships in Los Angeles.

Further medals were gained – at both the world championships and the Commonwealth Games – in 2018 where he won Wales's first medal, a silver in the men's B&VI 1,000m time trial.

Ball returned to the top step of the podium at the 2019 world championships, winning the kilo alongside Pete Mitchell.

In 2020 Ball teamed up with Stewart, and the partnership got off to a hugely promising start, winning sprint gold and kilo silver at the world championships in Milton.

In 2021 Ball expanded his collection landing the silver in the men's 1000m time trial at the Tokyo games, further cementing his partnership with Lewis Stewart where they narrowly missed out on the gold to fellow GB teammates Neil Fachie and Matt Rotherham.

At the 2025 UCI Para-cycling Track World Championships in Rio de Janeiro, Ball and pilot Steffan Lloyd won the men's B 1 km time trial—their first world title in the event—clocking 1:00.773.

In October 2026, he competed at the 2026 UCI Para Cycling Track World Championships, along with new pilot Aaron Pope, and won a gold medal in the tandem B kilo with a time of 59.563 seconds.

== Personal history ==
Ball was born in 1991, and comes from Ponthir in Wales.
