= Cycling at the 2018 Commonwealth Games – Women's tandem sprint B =

Cycling Track – Women's tandem sprint B at the 2018 Commonwealth Games
- Venue: Anna Meares Velodrome
- Dates: 5 April 2018
- Competitors: 3 from 3 nations

Medalists
gold medal	Sophie Thornhill; Helen Scott (pilot)	England

The Women's tandem sprint B at the 2018 Commonwealth Games, was part of the cycling programme, which took place on 5 April 2018. This event was for blind and visually impaired cyclists riding with a sighted pilot.

As only three nations entered the event, per Commonwealth Games regulations, no silver or bronze medal was available.

== Records ==
Prior to this competition, the existing world and Games records were as follows:

World record (Note: The mark of 10.891 set by Sophie Thornhill in the 2018 World Championships was not ratified at the time.)	Jessica Gallagher (AUS)	11.045	Montichiari, Italy	20 March 2016
Games record	Sophie Thornhill (ENG)	11.277	Glasgow, Scotland	24 July 2014

== Schedule ==
The schedule is as follows:

All times are Australian Eastern Standard Time (UTC+10)

Date	Time	Round
Thursday 5 April 2018	14:32	Qualifying
Thursday 5 April 2018	19:02	Final

== Results ==
=== Qualifying ===
The two fastest tandems advance to the gold medal final.

Rank	Nation	Riders	Time	Behind	Average speed (km/h)	Notes
1	England	Sophie Thornhill; Helen Scott (pilot)	10.609	—	67.867	WR
2	Australia	Jessica Gallagher; Madison Janssen (pilot)	10.954	+0.345	65.729	
3	Scotland	Aileen McGlynn; Louise Haston (pilot)	11.157	+0.548	64.533	

=== Gold medal final ===
Rank	Nation	Riders	Race 1	Race 2	Decider (i.r.)
1st place, gold medalist(s)	England	Sophie Thornhill; Helen Scott (pilot)	X	X	
2	Australia	Jessica Gallagher; Madison Janssen (pilot)	+0.167	+0.207	
