= Cycling at the 2018 Commonwealth Games =

- (From left to right) Mountain biking, Road, Track
- Venue: Currumbin Beachfront (road); Nerang National Park (mountain biking); Anna Meares Velodrome (track)
- Dates: 10 & 14 April 2018 (road); 12 April 2018 (mountain biking); 5–8 April 2018 (track)

Cycling at the 2018 Commonwealth Games was the 20th appearance of Cycling at the Commonwealth Games. The cycling competition at the 2018 Commonwealth Games was held at the Currumbin Beachfront (road), Nerang National Park (mountain biking), both of which are located in the Gold Coast and Anna Meares Velodrome (track, located in Brisbane) from 5 to 14 April.

A total of 26 events were held: 4 in road cycling, 2 in mountain biking and 20 in track cycling (including four events in para-track cycling). The 26 events were evenly split between men and women. This was done after the Commonwealth Games Federation (CGF) added more women's events in October 2016, to make the games a gender-equal games in terms of overall medal events.

== Schedule ==
H	Heats/qualifying	¼	Quarterfinals	½	Semifinals	F	Final

Road cycling and mountain biking
Date Event	Tue 10	Wed 11	Thu 12	Fri 13	Sat 14
Road cycling
Men's road race					F
Men's time trial	F				
Women's road race					F
Women's time trial	F				
Mountain biking
Men's cross-country			F		
Women's cross-country			F		

Track and para-track cycling
Date Event	Thu 5		Fri 6				Sat 7				Sun 8		
Track cycling
Men's keirin			H		½	F							
Men's individual pursuit			Q		F								
Men's team pursuit	Q	F											
Men's sprint							H	¼	½	F			
Men's 1 km time trial											F		
Men's team sprint	Q	F											
Men's points race											H	F	
Men's scratch race							H		F				
Women's sprint			H	¼	½	F							
Women's keirin											H	½	F
Women's 500m time trial							F						
Women's team sprint	Q	F											
Women's individual pursuit			Q		F								
Women's points race									F				
Women's scratch race												F	
Women's team pursuit	Q	F											
Para-track cycling
Men's tandem sprint B							Q	½	F				
Men's tandem 1 km time trial B	F												
Women's tandem sprint B	Q	F											
Women's tandem 1 km time trial B							F						

== Medal summary ==
=== Medal table ===
* Host nation (Australia)

Rank	Nation	Gold	Silver	Bronze	Total
1	Australia*	14	3	6	23
2	England	4	4	5	13
3	Scotland	4	4	2	10
4	New Zealand	3	9	5	17
5	Wales	1	4	1	6
6	Canada	0	0	3	3
7	South Africa	0	0	2	2
Totals (7 entries)		26	24	24	74

=== Road cycling ===
Event	Gold	Silver	Bronze
Men's road race	Steele Von Hoff; Australia	Jon Mould; Wales	Clint Hendricks; South Africa
Men's time trial	Cameron Meyer; Australia	Harry Tanfield; England	Hamish Bond; New Zealand
Women's road race	Chloe Hosking; Australia	Georgia Williams; New Zealand	Danielle Rowe; Wales
Women's time trial	Katrin Garfoot; Australia	Linda Villumsen; New Zealand	Hayley Simmonds; England

=== Track cycling ===
==== Men ====
Event	Gold	Silver	Bronze
Keirin	Matthew Glaetzer; Australia	Lewis Oliva; Wales	Edward Dawkins; New Zealand
Points race	Mark Stewart; Scotland	Campbell Stewart; New Zealand	Ethan Hayter; England
Individual pursuit	Charlie Tanfield; England	John Archibald; Scotland	Dylan Kennett; New Zealand
Team pursuit	Australia; Alex Porter; Sam Welsford; Leigh Howard; Kelland O'Brien; Jordan Kerby*	England; Oliver Wood; Kian Emadi; Charlie Tanfield; Ethan Hayter	Canada; Michael Foley; Jay Lamoureux; Derek Gee; Aidan Caves; Adam Jamieson*
Scratch race	Sam Welsford; Australia	Campbell Stewart; New Zealand	Christopher Latham; England
Sprint	Sam Webster; New Zealand	Jack Carlin; Scotland	Jacob Schmid; Australia
Team sprint	New Zealand; Ethan Mitchell; Sam Webster; Edward Dawkins	England; Ryan Owens; Joseph Truman; Philip Hindes	Australia; Nathan Hart; Jacob Schmid; Patrick Constable; Matthew Glaetzer*
1 km time trial	Matthew Glaetzer; Australia	Edward Dawkins; New Zealand	Callum Skinner; Scotland

==== Women ====
Event	Gold	Silver	Bronze
Keirin	Stephanie Morton; Australia	Kaarle McCulloch; Australia	Natasha Hansen; New Zealand
Points race	Elinor Barker; Wales	Katie Archibald; Scotland	Neah Evans; Scotland
Individual pursuit	Katie Archibald; Scotland	Rebecca Wiasak; Australia	Annette Edmondson; Australia
Team pursuit	Australia; Alexandra Manly; Annette Edmondson; Ashlee Ankudinoff; Amy Cure	New Zealand; Kirstie James; Rushlee Buchanan; Racquel Sheath; Bryony Botha	Canada; Allison Beveridge; Annie Foreman-Mackey; Ariane Bonhomme; Stephanie Roorda
Scratch race	Amy Cure; Australia	Neah Evans; Scotland	Emily Kay; England
Sprint	Stephanie Morton; Australia	Natasha Hansen; New Zealand	Kaarle McCulloch; Australia
Team sprint	Australia; Kaarle McCulloch; Stephanie Morton	New Zealand; Natasha Hansen; Emma Cumming	England; Lauren Bate; Katy Marchant
500 m time trial	Kaarle McCulloch; Australia	Stephanie Morton; Australia	Emma Cumming; New Zealand

=== Para-track cycling ===
Event	Gold	Silver	Bronze
Men's tandem sprint B	Scotland; Neil Fachie; Matt Rotherham (pilot)	Wales; James Ball; Peter Mitchell (pilot)	Australia; Brad Henderson; Tom Clarke (pilot)
Men's tandem 1 km time trial B	Scotland; Neil Fachie; Matt Rotherham (pilot)	Wales; James Ball; Peter Mitchell (pilot)	Australia; Brad Henderson; Tom Clarke (pilot)
Women's tandem sprint B	England; Sophie Thornhill; Helen Scott (pilot)	Only medal awarded	
Women's tandem 1 km time trial B	England; Sophie Thornhill; Helen Scott (pilot)	Only medal awarded	

=== Mountain biking ===
Event	Gold	Silver	Bronze
Men's cross country	Sam Gaze; New Zealand	Anton Cooper; New Zealand	Alan Hatherly; South Africa
Women's cross country	Annie Last; England	Evie Richards; England	Haley Smith; Canada

=== Records ===
Date	Event	Time	Name	Nation	Records
5 April	Women's B&VI sprint qualifying	10.609	Sophie Thornhill; Helen Scott	England	WR, GR
5 April	Women's 4000m team pursuit qualifying	4:17.218	Ashlee Ankudinoff; Amy Cure; Annette Edmondson; Alexandra Manly	Australia	GR
5 April	Men's 4000m team pursuit qualifying	3:52.041	Leigh Howard; Jordan Kerby; Alex Porter; Sam Welsford	Australia	GR
5 April	Women's team sprint qualifying	32.578	Kaarle McCulloch; Stephanie Morton	Australia	GR
5 April	Men's team sprint qualifying	42.822	Ethan Mitchell; Eddie Dawkins; Sam Webster	New Zealand	GR
5 April	Men's B&VI 1000m time trial final	1:00.065	Neil Fachie; Matt Rotherham	Scotland	GR
5 April	Women's 4000m team pursuit final	4:15.214	Ashlee Ankudinoff; Amy Cure; Annette Edmondson; Alexandra Manly	Australia	GR
5 April	Men's 4000m team pursuit final	3:49.804	Alex Porter; Sam Welsford; Leigh Howard; Kelland O'Brien	Australia	WR, GR
5 April	Women's team sprint final	32.488	Kaarle McCulloch; Stephanie Morton	Australia	GR
6 April	Women's sprint qualifying	10.524	Stephanie Morton	Australia	GR
6 April	Women's 3000m individual pursuit qualifying	3:24.119	Katie Archibald	Scotland	GR
6 April	Men's 4000m individual pursuit qualifying	4.11.455	Charlie Tanfield	England	GR
7 April	Men's sprint qualifying	9.583	Matthew Glaetzer	Australia	GR
7 April	Men's B&VI sprint qualifying	9.568	Neil Fachie; Matt Rotherham	Scotland	WR, GR
7 April	Women's B&VI 1000m time trial final	1:04.623	Sophie Thornhill; Helen Scott	England	WR, GR
8 April	Men's 1000m time trial final	59.340	Matthew Glaetzer	Australia	GR

== Participating nations ==
Multiple athletes took part in more than one discipline. For example, all of Canada's road athletes also competed in the track events.

=== Road ===
There are 34 participating nations in road cycling with a total of 167 athletes.

- Anguilla (5 athletes)
- Antigua and Barbuda (2)
- Australia (12)
- Bahamas (2)
- Belize (4)
- Canada (10)
- Cayman Islands (1)
- Cyprus (2)
- Dominica (1)
- England (13)
- Ghana (3)
- Gibraltar (3)
- Guernsey (7)
- Isle of Man (8)
- Jamaica (1)
- Jersey (6)
- Kenya (4)
- Lesotho (1)
- Malta (2)
- Mauritius (6)
- Mozambique (1)
- Namibia (6)
- New Zealand (13)
- Northern Ireland (7)
- Rwanda (8)
- Saint Vincent and the Grenadines (2)
- Scotland (8)
- Seychelles (3)
- Sierra Leone (2)
- South Africa (5)
- Sri Lanka (2)
- Swaziland (3)
- Uganda (2)
- Wales (12)

=== Mountain bike ===
There are 15 participating nations in mountain biking with a total of 34 athletes.

- Australia (2 athletes)
- Bermuda (1)
- Canada (3)
- Cyprus (2)
- England (3)
- Guernsey (3)
- Isle of Man (1)
- Jersey (2)
- Lesotho (3)
- Namibia (2)
- New Zealand (4)
- Northern Ireland (2)
- Scotland (2)
- South Africa (3)
- Wales (1)

=== Track ===
There are 18 participating nations in track cycling with a total of 146 athletes.

- Antigua and Barbuda (1 athlete)
- Australia (19)
- Barbados (1)
- Canada (15)
- England (15)
- India (9)
- Isle of Man (2)
- Jamaica (1)
- Malaysia (13)
- New Zealand (20)
- Northern Ireland (7)
- Scotland (9)
- Seychelles (3)
- Singapore (1)
- South Africa (10)
- Trinidad and Tobago (4)
- Wales (16)

=== Para-track ===
There are 6 participating nations in para-track cycling with a total of 8 athletes.

- Australia (2 athletes)
- England (1)
- Ghana (1)
- Malaysia (1)
- Scotland (2)
- Wales (1)

== See also ==
- Cycling Track Records
