= 2014 British National Track Championships =

British track cycling competition

- Venue: Manchester, England
- Date: 24–28 September 2014
- Velodrome: Manchester Velodrome

The 2014 British National Track Championships are a series of track cycling competitions held from 24–28 September 2014, at the Manchester Velodrome. They were organised and sanctioned by British Cycling, and were open to British cyclists.

== Competition ==
Separate competitions were held for both men and women, and 6 events were also included for paracyclists, an increase on 4 in 2013. No events were held in Omnium or Madison; the men's and women's programme was broadly identical, and otherwise matched the programme of the UCI World Track Cycling Championships. The women's team pursuit was held over 4000m for four cyclists for the second year.

Open to British cyclists, the winners of each event are entitled to wear the national champion's jersey - a white jersey with a red, white and blue front stripe - for the next year when competing in that discipline.

The sprint events were dominated by Callum Skinner and Jessica Varnish picking up four gold each, and a clean sweep of sprint events; Skinner shared team sprint gold with Olympic champions Jason Kenny and Philip Hindes, while Varnish secured team sprint gold with Dannielle Khan. All women's individual sprint medals were shared among Varnish, Khan, Victoria Williamson and Katy Marchant. Matthew Crampton took silvers in each of the individual sprint events.

The endurance events produced more unpredictable racing with Paralympian Dame Sarah Story securing points race gold, and Katie Archibald beating World, Olympic and Commonwealth champions Joanna Rowsell and Laura Trott in the individual pursuit.

Almost forty years after Maurice Burton, Britain's first black national champion on the track won the last of his senior national titles, his son Germain won his first, in the team pursuit.

Rachel James, sister of absent former World Champion Becky James achieved a unique double, medalling in both able bodied and paralympic events; she achieved a bronze in the team sprint, and piloted double Commonwealth Games champion Sophie Thornhill to two National titles for blind or visually impaired cyclists, in Kilo and 200m flying lap time trials.

== Medal summary ==
=== Men's Events ===
| Event | Gold | | Silver | | Bronze | |
|---|---|---|---|---|---|---|
Men's Events
| Kilo | Callum Skinner; The Rigmar Racers | 1.01.843 | Matthew Crampton; Sprint-Team | 1.02.636 | Matt Rotherham; Sportcity Velo | 1.03.497 |
| Sprint | Callum Skinner; The Rigmar Racers | | Matthew Crampton; Sprint-Team | | Philip Hindes; Sprint-Team | |
| Keirin | Callum Skinner; The Rigmar Racers | | Matthew Crampton; Sprint-Team | | Lewis Oliva; Team USN | |
| Team sprint | Philip Hindes; Jason Kenny; Callum Skinner rep. north West | 44.132 | Jack Payne; Matt Rotherham; Thomas Rotherham; Sportcity Velo | 47.223 | Peter Mitchell; Ryan Owens; Thomas Scammell; Performance Cycle Coaching | 46.84 |
| Individual Pursuit | Andrew Tennant; Madison-Genesis | ct in 3:50.841 | Steven Burke; HARIBO Beacon CT | | Jon Dibben; 100% Me | 4:26.990 |
| Team pursuit | Germain Burton; Christopher Latham; Christopher Lawless; Oliver Wood; 100% Me | 4:09.120 caught opp. | Jonathan Mould; Samuel Williams; Adam Blythe; Russell Downing; Sam Harrison; NFTO | caught | Alistair Rutherford; Philip Trodden; Finlay Young; Jack Barratt; Ryan Fenwick; Rigmar Racers | 4:38.457 |
| Points race | Mark Stewart; Spokes RT | 22 pts | Mark Christian; Team Raleigh | 18 pts | Jonathan Mould; NFTO | 16 pts |
| Scratch race | Oliver Wood; 100% ME | | Zachery May; Metaltek KUOTA RT | | Christopher Latham; 100% ME | |

=== Women's Events ===
| Event | Gold | | Silver | | Bronze | |
|---|---|---|---|---|---|---|
Women's Events
| 500m time trial | Jessica Varnish; Team V-Sprint Racing | 34.419 | Victoria Williamson; VC Norwich | 34.897 | Katy Marchant; Unattached | 35.012 |
| Sprint | Jessica Varnish; Team V-Sprint Racing | 2-0; 12.034; 12.153 | Katy Marchant; Unattached | | Victoria Williamson; VC Norwich | 2-0; 13.077; 11.847 |
| Keirin | Jessica Varnish; Team V-Sprint Racing | | Dannielle Khan; Solihull CC | | Katy Marchant; Unattached | |
| Team sprint | Dannielle Khan; Jessica Varnish rep. West Midlands | 33.969 | Katy Marchant; Victoria Williamson rep. North West | 34.142 | Rachel James; Helen Scott rep. North West | 34.998 |
| Individual Pursuit | Katie Archibald; Pearl Izumi | 3:34.869 | Laura Trott; Wiggle Honda | 3:37.294 | Joanna Rowsell; Wiggle Honda | 3:36.424 |
| Team pursuit | Elinor Barker; Laura Trott; Dani King; Joanna Rowsell; Wiggle Honda | 4.27.324 | Ciara Horne; Anna Turvey; Sarah Storey; Pearl Izumi | 4.33.657 | Jessica Hill; Madeline Moore; Rachel Murray; Harriet Whewell; VC St Raphael | caught opp. |
| Points race | Sarah Storey; Pearl Izumi | 58 pts | Elinor Barker; Wiggle Honda | 35 pts | Laura Trott; Wiggle Honda | 30 pts |
| Scratch race | Laura Trott; Wiggle Honda | | Emily Kay; Team USN | | Danielle King; Wiggle Honda | |

=== Para-cycling Events ===
A series of para-cycling national championships are also held over combined categories using a points system.

| Event | Gold | | Silver | | Bronze | |
|---|---|---|---|---|---|---|
Para-cycling Events
| BVI Mixed Gender 1000m | Sophie Thornhill; Performance Cycle Coaching; Rachel James (p); Abergavenny RC | F.T. 1.01.225; A.T. 1.09.804 | Neil Fachie; Peter Mitchell (p); Performance Cycle Coaching | F.T. 1.01.953; A.T. 1.01.953 | Laura Cluxton; Rock And Road Cycles; Louise Haston (p); City of Edinburgh RC | F.T. 1.04.933; A.T. 1.14.032 |
| C1-5 Mixed Gender Sprint Time Trial | Lauren Booth; Newport Youth Velo CC | F.T. 1.06.784; A. T. 40.654 over 500m | Jonathan Gildea; Seamons CC | F.T. 1.09.835; A.T. 1.09.835 over 1000m | Jaco van Gass; Team Battle Back | F.T. 1.12.085; A.T. 1.13.131 over 1000m |
| BVI Mixed Gender Para Pursuit | Lora Turnham; Corrine Hall; Matrix Fitness - Vulpine | F.T. 4.17.119; A.T. 3.39.860 over 3000m | Lauryn Therin; Bonito Squadra Corse; Rhiannon Henry; Abergavenny RC | F.T. 4.28.122; A.T. 3.49.269 over 3000m | Steve Bate; Adam Duggleby; Wheelbase Altura MGD | F.T. 4.30.313; A.T. 4.30.313 over 4000m |
| C1-5 Mixed Gender Para Pursuit | Jonathan Gildea; Seamons CC | F.T. 4.49.589; A.T. 4.49.589 over 4000m | Jaco van Gass; Team Battle Back | F.T. 5.00.798; A.T. 5.05.162 over 4000m | Louis Rolfe; Cambridge CC | F.T. 5.02.433; A.T. 4.13.464 over 3000m |
| BVI Mixed Gender 200m flying lap | Sophie Thornhill; Performance Cycle Coaching; Rachel James (p); Abergavenny RC | F.T. 9.822; A.T. 11.198 | Neil Fachie; Peter Mitchell (p); Performance Cycle Coaching | F.T. 10.149; A.T. 10.149 | Laura Cluxton; Rock And Road Cycles; Louise Haston (p); City of Edinburgh RC | F.T. 10.394; A.T. 11.850 |
| C1-5 Mixed Gender 200m flying lap | Jaco van Gass; Team Battle Back | F.T. 12.314; A.T. 12.493 | Lauren Booth; Newport Youth Velo CC | F.T. 12.485; A. T. 14.440 | Matthew Hamilton; Lee Valley Youth CC | F.T. 12.666; A.T. 12.666 |

A.T. = Actual Time F.T. = Factored time
