= Cycling at the 2018 Commonwealth Games – Women's tandem 1 km time trial B =

Cycling Track – Women's tandem 1 km time trial B at the 2018 Commonwealth Games
- Venue: Anna Meares Velodrome
- Dates: 7 April
- Competitors: 3 from 3 nations
- Winning time: 1:04.623

Medalists
| gold medal | Sophie Thornhill; Helen Scott (pilot) | England |

The women's tandem 1 km time trial B at the 2018 Commonwealth Games, was part of the cycling programme, which took place on 7 April 2018. This event was for blind and visually impaired cyclists riding with a sighted pilot.

As only three nations entered the event, per Commonwealth Games regulations, no silver or bronze medal was available.

== Records ==
Prior to this competition, the existing world and Games records were as follows:

| World record | Sophie Thornhill (GBR) | 1:05.079 | Rio de Janeiro, Brazil | 24 March 2018 |

== Results ==
| Rank | Nation | Riders | Time | Behind | Average speed (km/h) | Notes |
|---|---|---|---|---|---|---|
| 1st place, gold medalist(s) | England | Sophie Thornhill; Helen Scott (pilot) | 1:04.623 | – | 55.708 | WR |
| | Australia | Jessica Gallagher; Madison Janssen (pilot) | 1:07.165 | +2.542 | 53.559 | |
| | Scotland | Aileen McGlynn; Louise Haston (pilot) | 1:08.993 | +4.370 | 52.179 | |
