= Cycling at the 2018 Commonwealth Games – Men's 1 km time trial =

Cycling Track – Men's 1 km time trial at the 2018 Commonwealth Games
- Venue: Anna Meares Velodrome
- Dates: 8 April
- Competitors: 24 from 10 nations
- Winning time: 59.340 GR

Medalists
gold medal	Matthew Glaetzer	Australia
silver medal	Eddie Dawkins	New Zealand
bronze medal	Callum Skinner	Scotland

The men's 1 km time trial at the 2018 Commonwealth Games, was part of the cycling programme, which took place on 8 April 2018.

== Records ==
Prior to this competition, the existing world and Games records were as follows:

World record	François Pervis (FRA)	56.303	Aguascalientes, Mexico	7 December 2013
Games record	Scott Sunderland (AUS)	1:00.675	Glasgow, United Kingdom	26 July 2014

== Results ==
Rank	Rider	Time	Behind	Notes
1st place, gold medalist(s)	Matthew Glaetzer (AUS)	59.340	–	GR. Sea Level World Record.
2nd place, silver medalist(s)	Eddie Dawkins (NZL)	59.928	+0.588	
3rd place, bronze medalist(s)	Callum Skinner (SCO)	1:01.083	+1.743	
4	Zac Williams (NZL)	1:01.132	+1.792	
5	Jonathan Wale (SCO)	1:01.261	+1.921	
6	Patrick Constable (AUS)	1:01.438	+2.098	
7	Dylan Kennett (NZL)	1:01.546	+2.206	
8	Joseph Truman (ENG)	1:01.795	+2.455	
9	Nicholas Paul (TTO)	1:01.899	+2.559	
10	Nick Yallouris (AUS)	1:01.945	+2.605	
11	Muhammad Fadhil Mohd Zonis (MAS)	1:02.073	+2.733	
12	Kian Emadi (ENG)	1:02.079	+2.739	
13	Lewis Oliva (WAL)	1:02.198	+2.858	
14	Stefan Ritter (CAN)	1:02.339	+2.999	
15	Daniel Bigham (ENG)	1:02.691	+3.351	
16	Ethan Vernon (WAL)	1:02.935	+3.595	
17	Muhammad Sahrom (MAS)	1:03.253	+3.913	
18	Aidan Caves (CAN)	1:03.324	+3.984	
19	Irwandie Lakasek (MAS)	1:04.640	+5.300	
20	Sahil Kumar (IND)	1:05.538	+6.198	
21	Ranjit Singh (IND)	1:05.671	+6.331	
22	Sanuraj Sanandaraj (IND)	1:06.097	+6.757	
23	Christopher Gerry (SEY)	1:14.460	+15.120	
24	Stephen Belle (SEY)	1:14.639	+15.299	
