= Olympic record progression track cycling – Men's flying 200 m time trial =

This is an overview of the progression of the Olympic track cycling record of the men's flying 200 m time trial as recognised by the Union Cycliste Internationale (UCI).

The men's flying 200 m time trial is the qualification for the men's sprint. This discipline is competed since the first Olympics at the 1896 Summer Olympics, but in 1988 the flying 200 m time trial was introduced as a qualification event. The UCI lists the first Olympic record in 1992.

== Progression ==
♦ denotes a performance that is also a current world record. Statistics are correct as of the end of the 2024 Summer Olympics.

Time (s)	Cyclists	Location	Track	Date	Meet	Ref
10.252	Jens Fiedler (GER)	(Spain) Barcelona	Open air	28 July 1992	1992 Olympics	
10.129	Gary Neiwand (AUS)	(United States) Atlanta	Open air	24 July 1996	1996 Olympics	
9.815	Chris Hoy (GBR)	(China) Beijing	Indoor	17 August 2008	2008 Olympics	
9.713	Jason Kenny (GBR)	(United Kingdom) London Velopark, London	Indoor	4 August 2012	2012 Olympics	
9.703	Callum Skinner (GBR)	(Brazil) Rio Olympic Velodrome, Rio de Janeiro	Indoor	12 August 2016	2016 Olympics	
9.551	Jason Kenny (GBR)	(Brazil) Rio Olympic Velodrome, Rio de Janeiro	Indoor	12 August 2016	2016 Olympics	
9.306	Jack Carlin (GBR)	(Japan) Izu Velodrome, Izu	Indoor	4 August 2021	2020 Olympics	
9.215	Jeffrey Hoogland (NED)	(Japan) Izu Velodrome, Izu	Indoor	4 August 2021	2020 Olympics	
9.152	Mikhail Iakovlev (ISR)	(France) Vélodrome National, Saint-Quentin-en-Yvelines	Indoor	7 August 2024	2024 Olympics	
9.091	Matthew Richardson (AUS)	(France) Vélodrome National, Saint-Quentin-en-Yvelines	Indoor	7 August 2024	2024 Olympics	
♦9.088	Harrie Lavreysen (NED)	(France) Vélodrome National, Saint-Quentin-en-Yvelines	Indoor	7 August 2024	2024 Olympics	
