= Rachel James =

Welsh racing cyclist (born 1988)

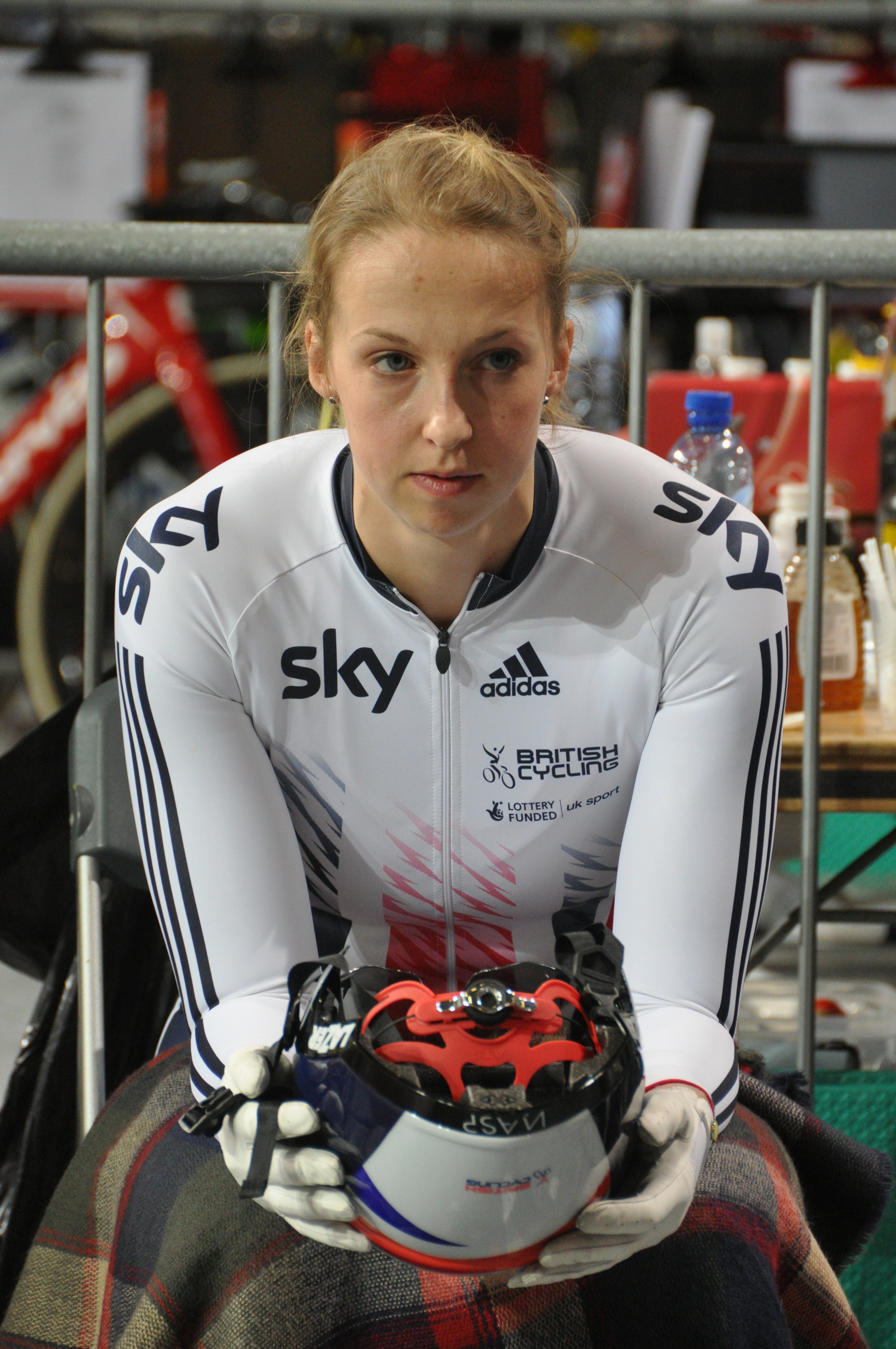
- Rachel James (2016)

Personal information
- Full name: Rachel Sarah James
- Born: 30 August 1988 (age 38) Abergavenny, Monmouthshire, Wales

Cycling career
- Sport: Cycling
- Disciplines: Track & Road
- Role: Rider
- Rider type: Sprinter / All-Rounder

Amateur team
- Abergavenny Road Club
Medal record
Representing Great Britain
Women's track cycling
UCI Para-cycling Track World Championships
| Gold medal – first place | 2014 Aguascalientes | Tandem B kilo |
| Gold medal – first place | 2014 Aguascalientes | Tandem B sprint |

Rachel Sarah James (born 30 August 1988) is a Welsh racing cyclist specializing in track cycling.

== Biography ==
James, from Abergavenny, Wales, is the daughter of David James and Christine Harris, and has a younger sister, Becky, who is a world champion racing cyclist, and also has another two younger sisters; Ffion and Megan, and brother Gareth, who are all keen cyclists. Although Rachel is older than Becky, it was Becky who entered the sport first: she persuaded Rachel to take up cycling, with the hope of the pair representing Wales in the team sprint at the 2014 Commonwealth Games - however these hopes were dashed when the event was removed from the Glasgow games' schedule.

In 2013, James became a pilot for paracyclist Sophie Thornhill. The pair won a gold medal and set a new world record at the 2014 UCI Para-cycling Track World Championships in Aguascalientes in the 1km time trial, on their debut in a major international event. They subsequently won a second gold in the tandem sprint.

James represented Wales at the Commonwealth Games in Glasgow, 2014 where she rode as pilot for former paralympic swimmer Rhiannon Henry. James reunited with Thornhill to compete in the 2014 British National Track Championships in September, where they won the mixed time trial and the 200 metre flying start time trial for blind and visually impaired riders. In addition James took a bronze medal in the team sprint alongside Helen Scott.

== Palmarès ==
2012
1st Team sprint, British National Track Championships (with Becky James)

2013
3rd Keirin, British National Track Championships
3rd Team sprint, British National Track Championships (with Ellie Coster)

2014
1st Tandem B 1km time trial, UCI Para-cycling Track World Championships (with Sophie Thornhill)
1st Tandem B sprint, UCI Para-cycling Track World Championships (with Sophie Thornhill)
1st Para Cycling BVI mixed time trial, British National Track Championships (with Sophie Thornhill)
1st Para Cycling BVI 200m flying start time trial, British National Track Championships (with Sophie Thornhill)
3rd Team sprint, British National Track Championships (with Helen Scott)
2017
2nd Keirin, Oberhausen
3rd Keirin, International track race - Panevežys
