= Cycling at the 2018 Commonwealth Games – Women's individual pursuit =

Cycling Track – Women's individual pursuit at the 2018 Commonwealth Games
- Venue: Anna Meares Velodrome
- Dates: 6 April
- Competitors: 22 from 9 nations
- Winning time: 3:26.088

Medalists
| gold medal | Katie Archibald | Scotland |
| silver medal | Rebecca Wiasak | Australia |
| bronze medal | Annette Edmondson | Australia |

The women's individual pursuit at the 2018 Commonwealth Games was part of the cycling programme, which took place on 6 April 2018.

== Records ==
Prior to this competition, the existing world and Games records were as follows:

| World record | Chloé Dygert (USA) | 3:20.060 | Apeldoorn, Netherlands | 3 March 2018 |
| Games record | Joanna Rowsell (ENG) | 3:29.038 | Glasgow, Scotland | 25 July 2014 |

== Schedule ==
The schedule is as follows:

All times are Australian Eastern Standard Time (UTC+10)

| Date | Time | Round |
|---|---|---|
| Friday 6 April 2018 | 13:26 | Qualifying |
| Friday 6 April 2018 | 19:30 / 19:38 | Finals |

== Results ==
=== Qualifying ===
The two fastest riders advance to the gold medal final. The next two fastest riders advance to the bronze medal final.

| Rank | Riders | Time | Behind | Notes |
|---|---|---|---|---|
| 1 | Katie Archibald (SCO) | 3:24.119 | — | QG, GR |
| 2 | Rebecca Wiasak (AUS) | 3:25.936 | +1.817 | QG |
| 3 | Annette Edmondson (AUS) | 3:27.255 | +3.136 | QB |
| 4 | Ashlee Ankudinoff (AUS) | 3:27.624 | +3.505 | QB |
| 5 | Kirstie James (NZL) | 3:29.192 | +5.073 | |
| 6 | Ellesse Andrews (NZL) | 3:33.707 | +9.588 | |
| 7 | Annie Foreman-Mackey (CAN) | 3:33.975 | +9.856 | |
| 8 | Ciara Horne (WAL) | 3:35.153 | +11.034 | |
| 9 | Bryony Botha (NZL) | 3:35.394 | +11.275 | |
| 10 | Emily Nelson (ENG) | 3:36.397 | +12.278 | |
| 11 | Kinley Gibson (CAN) | 3:36.582 | +12.463 | |
| 12 | Emily Kay (ENG) | 3:37.501 | +13.382 | |
| 13 | Ellie Dickinson (ENG) | 3:37.616 | +13.497 | |
| 14 | Jessica Roberts (WAL) | 3:37.625 | +13.506 | |
| 15 | Hayley Jones (WAL) | 3:37.658 | +13.539 | |
| 16 | Ariane Bonhomme (CAN) | 3:38.604 | +14.485 | |
| 17 | Eileen Burns (NIR) | 3:42.486 | +18.367 | |
| 18 | Charlene du Preez (RSA) | 3:45.764 | +21.645 | |
| 19 | Ilze Bole (RSA) | 3:53.312 | +29.193 | |
| 20 | Sonali Mayanglambam (IND) | 3:59.028 | +34.909 | |
| 21 | Danielle van Niekerk (RSA) | 4:03.570 | +39.451 | |
| 22 | Amritha Reghunath (IND) | 4:12.437 | +48.318 | |

=== Finals ===
The final classification is determined in the medal finals.

| Rank | Riders | Time | Behind | Notes |
|---|---|---|---|---|
Bronze medal final
| 3rd place, bronze medalist(s) | Annette Edmondson (AUS) | 3:30.922 | — | |
| 4 | Ashlee Ankudinoff (AUS) | 3:31.093 | +0.171 | |
Gold medal final
| 1st place, gold medalist(s) | Katie Archibald (SCO) | 3:26.088 | — | |
| 2nd place, silver medalist(s) | Rebecca Wiasak (AUS) | 3:27.548 | +1.460 | |
