= Rebecca Wiasak =

Australian cyclist (born 1984)

Personal information
- Born: 24 May 1984 (age 42) Geelong, Australia
- Height: 175 cm (5 ft 9 in)
- Weight: 65 kg (143 lb)

Cycling career
- Sport: Cycling
- Current team: Fearless Femme Racing
- Disciplines: Track cycling, Road racing

Amateur teams
- 2015–2017: High5 Dream Team
- 2017–: Fearless Femme Racing

Professional team
- 2014: Wiggle–Honda
Medal record
Representing Australia
Women's track cycling
World Championships
Gold medal – first place	2015 Yvelines	Individual pursuit
Gold medal – first place	2016 London	Individual pursuit
Silver medal – second place	2017 Hong Kong	Team pursuit
Commonwealth Games
Silver medal – second place	2018 Gold Coast	Individual pursuit

Rebecca Wiasak (born 24 May 1984) is an Australian track cyclist. She represented her nation at the 2015 UCI Track Cycling World Championships where she became a world champion in individual pursuit. In January 2015 she was announced as part of the inaugural line-up for the High5 Dream Team. In 2017, Wiasak raced domestically for ACTAS on the track, for High5 Dream Team in Australia and in the United States of America for Fearless Femme Racing on the road.

In 2009 Wiasak represented Australia in Lithuanian World Games competing in women's basketball. After missing out of selection to compete at a major international Games at the Glasgow 2014 and Rio 2016, Wiasak was selected for her first Commonwealth Games. At the 2018 Gold Coast Commonwealth Games, she set a new Australian record beating her previous national record set at the Paris 2015 track world championships, and Wiasak was one of four riders to beat the previous Commonwealth Games individual pursuit record Joanna Rowsell set in 2014.

== Major results ==
2014
BikeNZ Classic

1st Points Race
2nd Omnium

Oceania Track Championships

2nd Individual Pursuit
2nd Team Pursuit (with Ashlee Ankudinoff, Georgia Baker, Lauren Perry and Elissa Wundersitz)
3rd Scratch Race

2nd Scatch Race, BikeNZ Cup

2015
1st Individual pursuit, UCI Track World Championships
1st Individual Pursuit, South Australian Grand Prix

2016
1st Individual pursuit, UCI Track World Championships

2017
1st Individual pursuit, National Track Championships
2nd Team Pursuit, UCI Track World Championships
4th Individual Time Trial, Australian National Time Trial Championships

2018
1st Australian National Criterium Championships
2nd Individual Pursuit, Commonwealth Games
3rd Individual Pursuit, Australian National Track Championships

2019
1st Australian National Criterium Championships
5th Overall Lexus of Blackburn Bay Cycling Classic
