= Cycling at the 2016 Summer Paralympics – Women's 1 km time trial B =

1km time trial by bycycle

Cycling, Women's 1 km Time Trial B at the XV Paralympic Games
- Dates: September 11, 2016
- Competitors: 14 from 10 nations
- Winning time: 01:06.28(PR)

Medalists
1st place, gold medalist(s)		Sophie Thornhill pilot : Helen Scott	Great Britain
2nd place, silver medalist(s)		Larissa Klaassen pilot : Haliegh Dolman	Netherlands
3rd place, bronze medalist(s)		Jessica Gallagher pilot : Madison Janssen	Australia

The Women's 1 km Time Trial B track cycling event at the 2016 Summer Paralympics took place on September 10. This class was for blind and visually impaired cyclists riding with a sighted pilot. Fourteen pairs from 10 different nations competed.

== Results ==
Rank	Athlete	Nation	Time	Speed (km/h)	Notes
1st place, gold medalist(s)	Sophie Thornhill pilot : Helen Scott	Great Britain	01:06.28	54.312	PR
2nd place, silver medalist(s)	Larissa Klaassen pilot : Haliegh Dolman	Netherlands	01:07.06	53.684	
3rd place, bronze medalist(s)	Jessica Gallagher pilot : Madison Janssen	Australia	01:08.17	52.808	
4	Emma Foy pilot : Laura Thompson	New Zealand	01:10.19	51.291	
5	Yurie Kanuma pilot : Mai Tanaka	Japan	01:11.08	50.65	
6	Amanda Cameron pilot : Hannah Van Kampen	New Zealand	01:11.74	50.183	
7	Katie George Dunlevy pilot : Evelyn Mccrystal	Ireland	01:12.33	49.77	
8	Griet Hoet pilot : Anneleen Monsieur	Belgium	01:12.40	49.722	
9	Iwona Podkoscielna pilot : Aleksandra Teclaw	Poland	01:13.41	49.038	
10	Adamantia Chalkiadaki pilot : Argyro Milaki	Greece	01:13.43	49.025	
11	Anna Duzikowska pilot : Natalia Morytko	Poland	01:14.89	48.071	
12	Josefa Benitez Guzman pilot : Beatriu Gomez Franquet	Spain	01:15.38	47.756	
13	Marcia Fanhani pilot : Mariane Ferreira	Brazil	01:22.35	43.713	
14	Paraskevi Kantza pilot : Vasiliki Voutzali	Greece	01:23.75	42.986	
