= Cycling at the 2022 Commonwealth Games – Women's individual pursuit =

Cycling Track – Women's individual pursuit at the 2022 Commonwealth Games
- Venue: Lee Valley VeloPark
- Dates: 30 July
- Competitors: 15 from 8 nations
- Winning time: 3:18.456

Medalists
gold medal	Bryony Botha	New Zealand
silver medal	Maeve Plouffe	Australia
bronze medal	Neah Evans	Scotland

The women's individual pursuit at the 2022 Commonwealth Games was part of the cycling programme, which took place on 30 July 2022, at the Lee Valley VeloPark, Stratford, London, England.

== Records ==
Prior to this competition, the existing world and Games records were as follows:

World record	Chloé Dygert (USA)	3:16.937	Berlin, Germany	29 February 2020
Games record	Katie Archibald (SCO)	3:24.119	Brisbane, Australia	6 April 2018

== Schedule ==
The schedule is as follows:

All times are British Summer Time (UTC+1)

Date	Time	Round
Saturday 30 July 2022	10:41	Qualifying
Saturday 30 July 2022	16:30 / 16:37	Finals

== Results ==
=== Qualifying ===
The two fastest riders advanced to the gold medal final. The next two fastest riders advanced to the bronze medal final.

Rank	Riders	Time	Behind	Notes
1	Bryony Botha (NZL)	3:19.836	—	QG, GR
2	Maeve Plouffe (AUS)	3:21.995	+2.159	QG
3	Neah Evans (SCO)	3:23.476	+3.640	QB
4	Sarah Roy (AUS)	3:25.262	+5.426	QB
5	Josie Knight (ENG)	3:25.496	+5.660	
6	Anna Morris (WAL)	3:26.386	+6.550	
7	Maggie Coles-Lyster (CAN)	3:28.218	+8.382	
8	Ariane Bonhomme (CAN)	3:32.582	+12.746	
9	Alice Sharpe (NIR)	3:32.814	+12.978	
10	Sophie Edwards (AUS)	3:33.079	+13.243	
11	Ella Barnwell (WAL)	3:34.064	+14.228	
12	Maddie Leech (ENG)	3:34.420	+14.584	
13	Devaney Collier (CAN)	3:38.566	+18.730	
14	Grace Lister (ENG)	3:39.773	+19.937	
15	Meenakshi Rohilla (IND)	3:49.596	+29.760	

=== Finals ===
Rank	Riders	Time	Gap	Notes
Gold medal final
1st place, gold medalist(s)	Bryony Botha (NZL)	3:18.456	—	GR
2nd place, silver medalist(s)	Maeve Plouffe (AUS)	3:27.122	+8.666	
Bronze medal final
3rd place, bronze medalist(s)	Neah Evans (SCO)	3:25.050	—	
4	Sarah Roy (AUS)	3:28.079	+3.029	
