= 2014 UEC European Track Championships – Men's 1 km time trial =

Men's 1km time trial at the 2014 UEC European Track Championships
- UEC European Champion jersey
- Venue: Vélodrome Amédée Détraux, Baie-Mahault
- Date: 18 October
- Competitors: 18 from 13 nations

Medalists
gold medal	Callum Skinner	Great Britain
silver medal	Joachim Eilers	Germany
bronze medal	Quentin Lafargue	France

The Men's 1 km time trial was held on 18 October 2014.

== Results ==
Rank	Name	Nation	Time	Notes
1st place, gold medalist(s)	Callum Skinner	Great Britain	1:02.399	
2nd place, silver medalist(s)	Joachim Eilers	Germany	1:02.474	
3rd place, bronze medalist(s)	Quentin Lafargue	France	1:02.734	
4	Michaël D'Almeida	France	1:03.031	
5	Eric Engler	Germany	1:03.542	
6	Tomáš Bábek	Czech Republic	1:03.729	
7	Krzysztof Maksel	Poland	1:04.174	
8	José Moreno Sánchez	Spain	1:04.802	
9	Hugo Haak	Netherlands	1:04.869	
10	Matthew Crampton	Great Britain	1:04.909	
11	Alexey Tkachev	Russia	1:04.919	
12	Francesco Ceci	Italy	1:05.292	
13	Nils van 't Hoenderdaal	Netherlands	1:06.311	
14	Moreno De Pauw	Belgium	1:06.493	
15	Anders Holm	Denmark	1:06.734	
16	Rafał Sarnecki	Poland	1:06.920	
17	Ioannis Kalogeropoulos	Greece	1:08.198	
18	Sandor Szalontay	Hungary	DNS	
