= Devon Briggs =

New Zealand para-cyclist (born 2004)

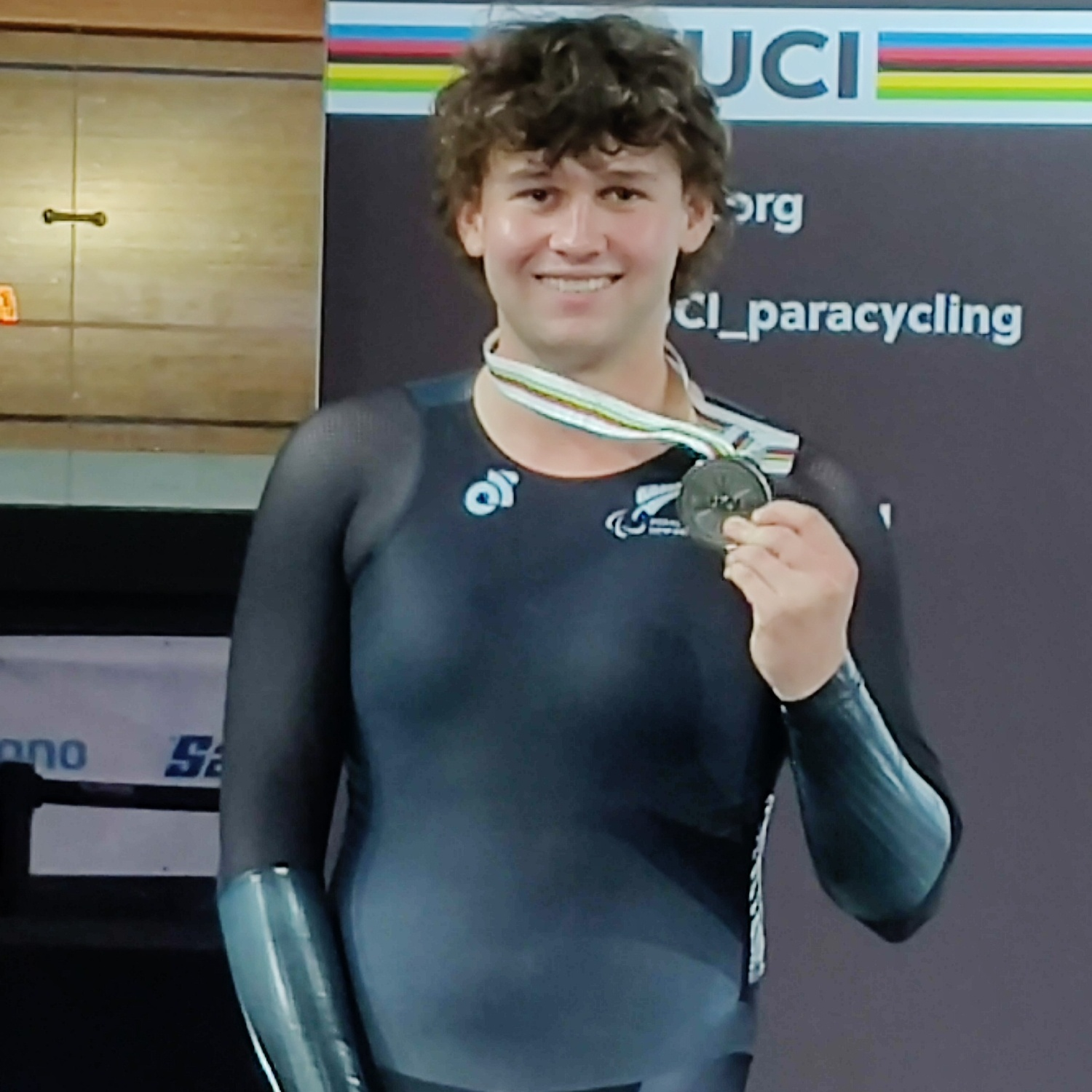
- Briggs in 2022

Personal information
- Born: 13 January 2004 (age 22)
- Home town: Cambridge, New Zealand

Sport
- Sport: Para-cycling
- Disability: Clubfoot
- Disability class: C3
- Coached by: Damian Wiseman
Medal record
Men's para-cycling
Representing New Zealand
Track World Championships
Gold medal – first place	2024 Rio de Janeiro	Time trial C3
Gold medal – first place	2025 Rio de Janeiro	Scratch race C3
Gold medal – first place	2026 Apeldoorn	Sprint C3
Gold medal – first place	2026 Apeldoorn	Time trial C3
Gold medal – first place	2026 Apeldoorn	Elimination C3
Silver medal – second place	2022 Saint-Quentin-en-Yvelines	Time trial C4
Silver medal – second place	2022 Saint-Quentin-en-Yvelines	Omnium C4
Silver medal – second place	2024 Rio de Janeiro	Omnium C3
Silver medal – second place	2025 Rio de Janeiro	Sprint C3
Silver medal – second place	2025 Rio de Janeiro	Time trial C3
Silver medal – second place	2026 Apeldoorn	Scratch race C3
Bronze medal – third place	2023 Glasgow	Time trial C3
Bronze medal – third place	2023 Glasgow	Individual pursuit C3
Bronze medal – third place	2023 Glasgow	Scratch race C3
Bronze medal – third place	2023 Glasgow	Omnium C3
Bronze medal – third place	2024 Rio de Janeiro	Individual pursuit C3
Commonwealth Games
Gold medal – first place	2026 Glasgow	Time trial C1–3
Bronze medal – third place	2026 Glasgow	Ind. pursuit C1–3

Devon Briggs (born 13 January 2004) is a New Zealand para-cyclist who competes in road and track events. He represented New Zealand at the 2024 Summer Paralympics. He is a five-time Track World Champion.

== Early life ==
Briggs was born with severe clubfeet, and has undergone 19 surgeries. He began cycling at ten years old.

== Career ==
Briggs made his international debut for New Zealand at the 2022 UCI Para-cycling Track World Championships and won silver medals in the time trial and omnium C4 events.

At 18 years old, he was the youngest member for New Zealand's cycling team. He again competed at the 2023 UCI Para-cycling Track World Championships and won bronze medals in the time trial, individual pursuit, scratch race and omnium C3 events.

In March 2024, Briggs represented New Zealand at the 2024 UCI Para-cycling Track World Championships and won a gold medal in the time trial C3 event with a world record time of 1:05.259. He also won a silver medal in the omnium and a bronze medal in the individual pursuit. In September 2024, he then competed at the 2024 Summer Paralympics and finished in fifth place in the individual pursuit C3 event and seventh place in the time trial C1–3 event. He competed in the track cycling events with a fractured sacrum and dislocated coccyx which he suffered in a crash during his final training session in Switzerland. He then withdrew from the road cycling events at the Paralympics.

On 9 September 2025, he was selected to represent New Zealand at the 2025 UCI Para-cycling Track World Championships. He won a silver medal in the sprint C3 event.

In July 2026 he competed at the 2026 Commonwealth Games and won a gold medal in the time trial C1–3 event with a Commonwealth Games record time of 1:05.536. He also won a bronze medal in the individual pursuit C1–3 event. In October 2026, he competed at the 2026 UCI Para Cycling Track World Championships and won gold medals in the sprint, time trial, and elimination C3 events. He also won a silver medal in the scratch race C3 event.
