= List of Commonwealth Games records in track cycling =

This is the list of Commonwealth Games records in track cycling.

== Men's records ==
♦ denotes a performance that is also a current Para-cycling world record. Statistics are correct as of the 2026 Commonwealth Games.

Event	Record	Athlete	Nationality	Date	Meet	Place	Ref
Flying 200 m time trial (progression)	9.361	Leigh Hoffman	Australia	1 August 2026	2026 Commonwealth Games	Glasgow, Scotland	
1 km time trial (progression)	58.530	Leigh Hoffman	Australia	2 August 2026	2026 Commonwealth Games	Glasgow, Scotland	
Team sprint (progression)	42.040	Matthew Glaetzer; Leigh Hoffman; Matthew Richardson	Australia	29 July 2022	2022 Commonwealth Games	London, England	
4000 m individual pursuit (progression)	4:03.898	Oliver Bleddyn	Australia	31 July 2026	2026 Commonwealth Games	Glasgow, Scotland	
4000 m team pursuit (progression)	3:47.092	Henry Hobbs; Charlie Tanfield; William Tidball; Ethan Vernon	England	30 July 2026	2026 Commonwealth Games	Glasgow, Scotland	
Flying 200 m time trial (B tandem)	♦ 9.568	Neil Fachie; Matt Rotherham (pilot)	Scotland	7 April 2018	2018 Commonwealth Games	Brisbane, Australia	
1 km time trial (B tandem)	59.938	Neil Fachie; Lewis Stewart (pilot)	Scotland	29 July 2022	2022 Commonwealth Games	London, England	
1 km time trial (C1)	1:14.547	Mohamad Shaharuddin	Malaysia	31 July 2026	2026 Commonwealth Games	Glasgow, Scotland	
1 km time trial (C2)	1:11.282	Gordon Allan	Australia	31 July 2026	2026 Commonwealth Games	Glasgow, Scotland	
1 km time trial (C3)	1:05.536	Devon Briggs	New Zealand	31 July 2026	2026 Commonwealth Games	Glasgow, Scotland	
3000 m individual pursuit (C1)	4:00.263	Mohamad Shaharuddin	Malaysia	2 August 2026	2026 Commonwealth Games	Glasgow, Scotland	
3000 m individual pursuit (C2)	3:34.388	Matthew Robertson	England	2 August 2026	2026 Commonwealth Games	Glasgow, Scotland	
3000 m individual pursuit (C3)	3:22.921	Fin Graham	Scotland	2 August 2026	2026 Commonwealth Games	Glasgow, Scotland	

== Women's records ==
♦ denotes a performance that is also a current Para-cycling world record. Statistics are correct as of the 2026 Commonwealth Games.

Event	Record	Athlete	Nationality	Date	Meet	Place	Ref
Flying 200 m time trial (progression)	10.322	Emma Finucane	Wales	31 July 2026	2026 Commonwealth Games	Glasgow, Scotland	
500 m time trial (progression)	33.234	Kristina Clonan	Australia	31 July 2022	2022 Commonwealth Games	London, England	
1 km time trial (progression)	1:05.285	Emma Finucane	Wales	1 August 2026	2026 Commonwealth Games	Glasgow, Scotland	
Team sprint (500 m) (progression)	32.488	Kaarle McCulloch; Stephanie Morton	Australia	5 April 2018	2018 Commonwealth Games	Brisbane, Australia	
Team sprint (750 m) (progression)	46.760	Rhian Edmunds; Emma Finucane; Lowri Thomas	Wales	30 July 2026	2026 Commonwealth Games	Glasgow, Scotland	
3000 m individual pursuit (progression)	3:18.456	Bryony Botha	New Zealand	30 July 2022	2022 Commonwealth Games	London, England	
4000 m individual pursuit (progression)	4:24.272	Anna Morris	Wales	31 July 2026	2026 Commonwealth Games	Glasgow, Scotland	
4000 m team pursuit (progression)	4:10.658	Georgia Baker; Claudia Marcks; Alyssa Polites; Felicity Wilson-Haffenden	Australia	30 July 2026	2026 Commonwealth Games	Glasgow, Scotland	
Flying 200 m time trial (B tandem)	♦ 10.609	Sophie Thornhill; Helen Scott (pilot)	England	5 April 2018	2018 Commonwealth Games	Brisbane, Australia	
1 km time trial (B tandem)	♦ 1:04.623	Sophie Thornhill; Helen Scott (pilot)	England	7 April 2018	2018 Commonwealth Games	Brisbane, Australia	
1 km time trial (C4)	♦ 1:09.667	Tara Neyland	Australia	2 August 2026	2026 Commonwealth Games	Glasgow, Scotland	
1 km time trial (C5)	1:13.653	Nicole Murray	New Zealand	2 August 2026	2026 Commonwealth Games	Glasgow, Scotland	
4000 m individual pursuit (C4)	♦ 4:49.648	Tara Neyland	Australia	30 July 2026	2026 Commonwealth Games	Glasgow, Scotland	
4000 m individual pursuit (C5)	♦ 5:05.764	Morgan Newberry	England	30 July 2026	2026 Commonwealth Games	Glasgow, Scotland	

== See also ==
- Commonwealth Games records
