= Track cycling at the 2026 Commonwealth Games – Men's individual pursuit C1–3 =

Cycling Track – Men's individual pursuit C1-3 at the 2026 Commonwealth Games
- Venue: Sir Chris Hoy Velodrome
- Dates: 2 August
- Competitors: 6 from 4 nations
- Winning time: 3:22.597 GR

Medalists
gold medal	Matthew Robertson	England
silver medal	Finlay Graham	Scotland
bronze medal	Devon Briggs	New Zealand

The men's individual pursuit C1-3 at the 2026 Commonwealth Games was part of the cycling programme, and took place on 2 August 2026. The event, held for the first time in Glasgow, was won by English para cyclist Matthew Robertson.

== Records ==
Prior to this competition, the existing world records in the individual pursuit were as follows:

C1	3:31.338	Li Zhangyu (CHN)	Saint-Quentin-en-Yvelines (France)	September 1 2024
C2	3:24.298	Alexandre Leaute (FRA)	Saint-Quentin-en-Yvelines (France)	September 1 2024
C3	3:15.488	Jaco van Gass (GBR)	Saint-Quentin-en-Yvelines (France)	September 1 2024

== Schedule ==
The schedule is as follows:

All times are British Summer Time (UTC+1)

Date	Time	Round
Friday 2 August2026	12:29	Qualifying
Friday 2 August2026	18:16 / 18:23	Finals

== Results ==
=== Qualifying ===
The two fastest riders advanced to the gold medal final. The next two fastest riders advanced to the bronze medal final.

Rank	Name	Country	Classification	Real time	Factor (%)	Factored time	Notes
1	Finlay Graham	Scotland	C3	3:22.921; C3 GR	100	3:22.921	QG
2	Matthew Robertson	England	C2	3:37.624; C2 GR	94.5	3:25.655	QG
3	Devon Briggs	New Zealand	C3	3:25.889	100	3:25.889	QB
4	Gordon Allan	Australia	C2	3:41.854	94.5	3:29.652	QB
5	Mohamad Shaharuddin	Malaysia	C1	4:00.263; C1 GR	92.01	3:41.066	
6	Chris Burns	Northern Ireland	C2	3:56.480	94.5	3:43.474	

=== Finals ===
The finals took place on the afternoon of 2 August.

For gold

Rank	Name	Country	Classification	Real time	Factor (%)	Factored time
1st place, gold medalist(s)	Matthew Robertson	England	C2	3:34.388; C2 GR	94.5	3:22.597
2nd place, silver medalist(s)	Finlay Graham	Scotland	C3	3:23.673	100	3:23.673

For bronze

Rank	Name	Country	Classification	Real time	Factor (%)	Factored time
3rd place, bronze medalist(s)	Devon Briggs	New Zealand	C3	3:26.682	100	3:26.682
4	Gordon Allan	Australia	C2	3:43.344	94.5	3:31.060
