= Cycling at the 2016 Summer Olympics – Men's sprint =

Men's sprint at the Games of the XXXI Olympiad
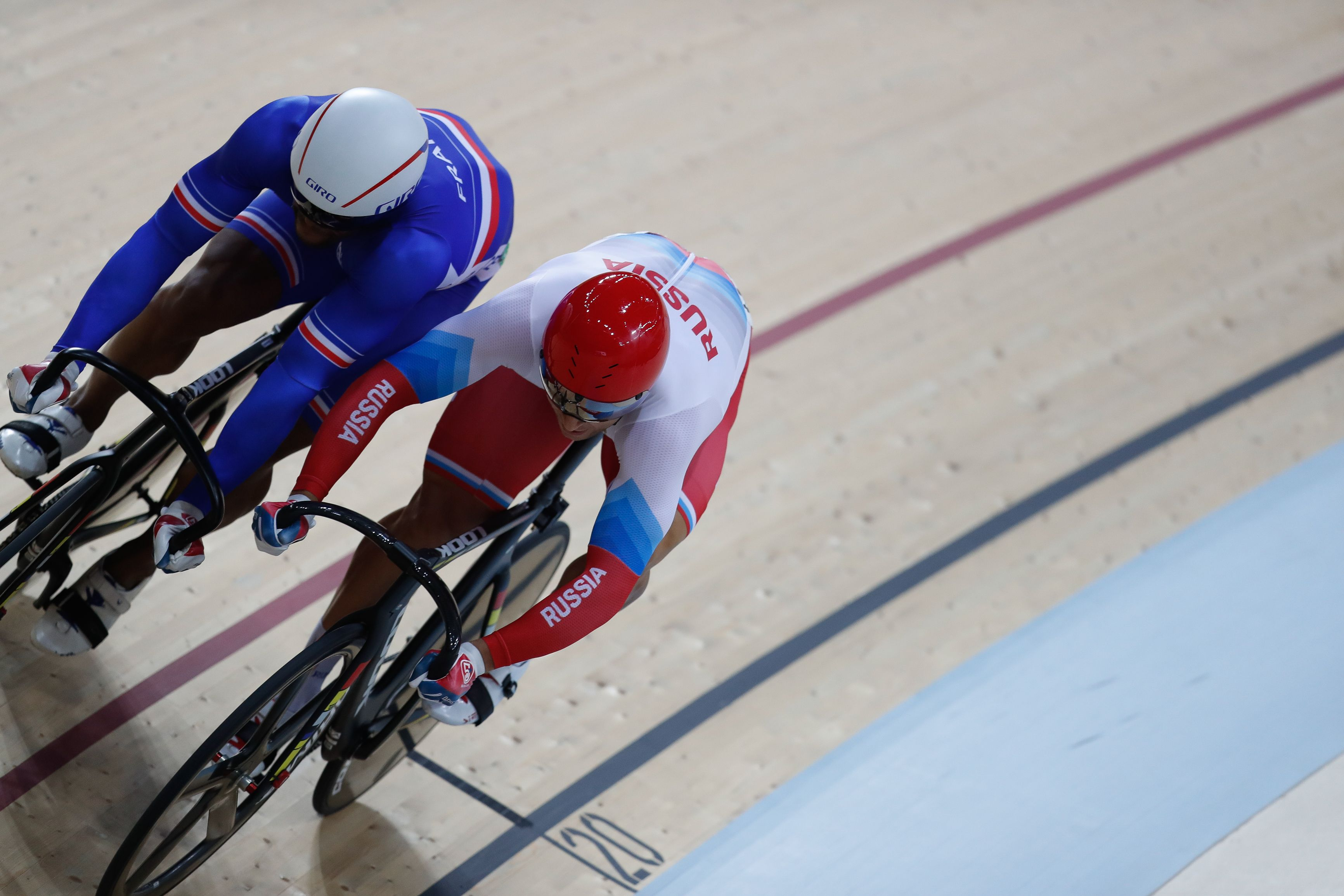
- A quarterfinal race between Denis Dmitriev and Grégory Baugé
- Venue: Rio Olympic Velodrome
- Dates: 12–14 August 2016
- Competitors: 27 from 16 nations

Medalists
1st place, gold medalist(s)		Jason Kenny	Great Britain
2nd place, silver medalist(s)		Callum Skinner	Great Britain
3rd place, bronze medalist(s)		Denis Dmitriev	Russia

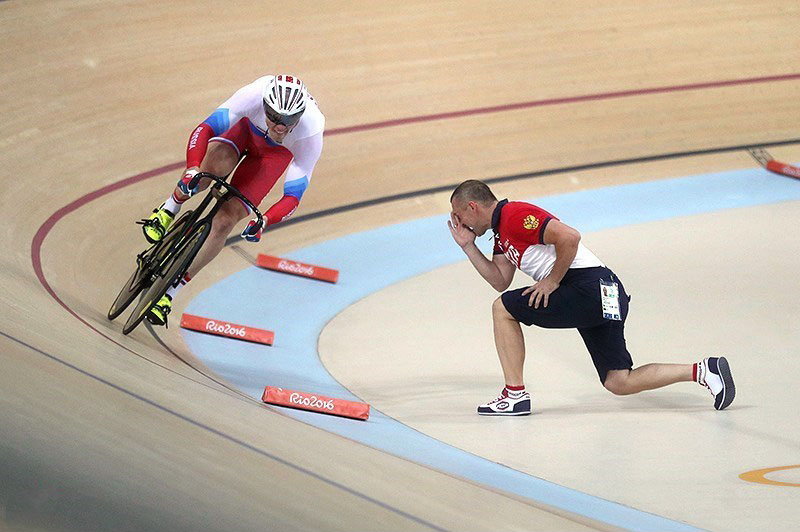
Denis Dmitriev and his coach

The men's sprint at the 2016 Olympic Games in Rio de Janeiro took place on 12–14 August 2016. There were 27 competitors from 16 nations, as once again nations were allowed to enter up to two cyclists (the limit had fluctuated between one and two since 1928). The event was won by Jason Kenny of Great Britain, successfully defending his gold from 2012 and making it the third straight Games that Great Britain was atop the podium for the sprint. Kenny was the third man to win two consecutive gold medals in the sprint, fourth man to win two golds at any point, and third man to win three medals of any color. He beat his teammate Callum Skinner in the final; it was the second time in three Games that Great Britain had both the top spots—and potentially could have been the third if nations had not been limited to a single cyclist in 2012. Denis Dmitriev earned Russia's first men's sprint medal with his bronze.

The medals were presented by Barry Maister, IOC member, New Zealand and David Lappartient, Vice President of the UCI.

== Background ==
This was the 26th appearance of the event, which has been held at every Summer Olympics except 1904 and 1912. Four of the quarterfinalists from 2012 returned: gold medalist (and 2008 silver medalist) Jason Kenny of Great Britain, silver medalist Grégory Baugé of France, fourth-place finisher Njisane Phillip of Trinidad and Tobago, and fifth-place finisher Denis Dmitriev of Russia. Baugé had won the 2015 world championship (adding to his 2009–12 run, though the 2011 title had been stripped from him) and Dmitriev had been a fixture on the world championships podium throughout the four years since the last Games. Kenny had struggled for much of that period, but had a strong 2016 including a victory over Matthew Glaetzer of Australia in the 2016 worlds final.

No nations made their debut in the men's sprint. France made its 26th appearance, the only nation to have competed at every appearance of the event.

== Qualification ==
There were 27 quota places available for the sprint. The nine nations qualified for the team sprint event could enter two members of the team in the individual sprint. The other nine places were assigned to nations based on the 2014–16 UCI track rankings, with one place for each of the top nine nations not qualified through team sprint.

== Competition format ==
The event was a single-elimination tournament, with repechages after the first two rounds, after seeding via time trial. The time trial involved an 875-metre distance, but with only the last 200 metres timed. All other races were 750 metres (three laps of the track) with side-by-side starts, with time kept for the last 200 metres. The first two main rounds featured single head-to-head races, with winners advancing and losers competing in repechages. Repechage races were contested by up to 3 cyclists. Beginning with the quarterfinals, each match pitted two cyclists against each other in best-of-three races.

== Records ==
The records for the sprint are 200 metre flying time trial records, kept for the qualifying round in later Games as well as for the finish of races.

World record	François Pervis (FRA)	9.347	Aguascalientes, Mexico	30 May 2009
Olympic record	Jason Kenny (GBR)	9.713	London, United Kingdom	4 August 2012

Callum Skinner set a new Olympic record of 9.703 seconds in the qualifying round, but Jason Kenny regained the record with his time of 9.551. Matthew Glaetzer also finished under the old record time.

== Schedule ==
All times are Brasília Time (UTC−03:00)

Date	Time	Round
Friday, 12 August 2016	16:14; 17:30; 18:08	Qualifying round Round 1 First repechage
Saturday, 13 August 2016	10:23; 11:07; 16:00; 16:18; 17:41; 18:17	1/8 finals Second repechage Quarterfinals; Classification 9–12; Semifinals; Classification 5–8
Sunday, 14 August 2016	17:04	Bronze medal match Final

== Results ==
=== Qualifying round ===
Rank	Cyclist	Nation	Time 200 m	Speed km/h	Notes
1	Jason Kenny	Great Britain	9.551	75.384	Q, OR
2	Callum Skinner	Great Britain	9.703	74.203	Q, ^{[A]}
3	Matthew Glaetzer	Australia	9.704	74.196	Q
4	Denis Dmitriev	Russia	9.774	73.664	Q
5	Grégory Baugé	France	9.807	73.416	Q
6	Njisane Phillip	Trinidad and Tobago	9.813	73.372	Q
7	Damian Zieliński	Poland	9.823	73.297	Q
8	Jeffrey Hoogland	Netherlands	9.837	73.193	Q
9	Sam Webster	New Zealand	9.880	72.874	Q
10	Edward Dawkins	New Zealand	9.895	72.764	Q
11	François Pervis	France	9.898	72.741	Q
12	Joachim Eilers	Germany	9.908	72.668	Q
13	Xu Chao	China	9.939	72.441	Q
14	Pavel Kelemen	Czech Republic	9.969	72.223	Q
15	Rafał Sarnecki	Poland	9.980	72.144	Q
16	Fabián Puerta	Colombia	9.981	72.137	Q
17	Patrick Constable	Australia	10.010	71.928	Q
18	Maximilian Levy	Germany	10.035	71.748	Q
19	Juan Peralta Gascon	Spain	10.055	71.606	
20	Kang Dong-jin	South Korea	10.092	71.343	
21	Theo Bos	Netherlands	10.140	71.005	
22	Im Chae-bin	South Korea	10.147	70.956	
23	Santiago Ramírez	Colombia	10.199	70.595	
24	Hersony Canelón	Venezuela	10.239	70.319	
25	Seiichiro Nakagawa	Japan	10.241	70.305	
26	Nikita Shurshin	Russia	10.418	69.111	
27	César Marcano	Venezuela	10.649	67.611	

- ^{^{A}} Was also an Olympic record until superseded by Jason Kenny

=== Round 1 ===
==== Heat 1 ====
Rank	Cyclist	Nation	Time 200 m	Speed km/h	Notes
1	Jason Kenny	Great Britain	10.245	70.278	Q
2	Maximilian Levy	Germany	+0.066		R

==== Heat 2 ====
Rank	Cyclist	Nation	Time 200 m	Speed km/h	Notes
1	Callum Skinner	Great Britain	10.254	70.216	Q
2	Patrick Constable	Australia	+0.071		R

==== Heat 3 ====
Rank	Cyclist	Nation	Time 200 m	Speed km/h	Notes
1	Matthew Glaetzer	Australia	10.299	69.909	Q
2	Fabián Puerta	Colombia	+0.058		R

==== Heat 4 ====
Rank	Cyclist	Nation	Time 200 m	Speed km/h	Notes
1	Denis Dmitriev	Russia	10.141	70.998	Q
2	Rafał Sarnecki	Poland	+0.036		R

==== Heat 5 ====
Rank	Cyclist	Nation	Time 200 m	Speed km/h	Notes
1	Grégory Baugé	France	10.214	70.491	Q
2	Pavel Kelemen	Czech Republic	+0.050		R

==== Heat 6 ====
Rank	Cyclist	Nation	Time 200 m	Speed km/h	Notes
1	Xu Chao	China	10.373	69.410	Q
2	Njisane Phillip	Trinidad and Tobago	+0.145		R

==== Heat 7 ====
Rank	Cyclist	Nation	Time 200 m	Speed km/h	Notes
1	Joachim Eilers	Germany	10.428	69.044	Q
2	Damian Zieliński	Poland	+0.041		R

==== Heat 8 ====
Rank	Cyclist	Nation	Time 200 m	Speed km/h	Notes
1	Jeffrey Hoogland	Netherlands	10.181	70.719	Q
2	François Pervis	France	+0.052		R

==== Heat 9 ====
Rank	Cyclist	Nation	Time 200 m	Speed km/h	Notes
1	Sam Webster	New Zealand	10.159	70.873	Q
2	Edward Dawkins	New Zealand	+0.150		R

=== First repechage ===
==== First repechage heat 1 ====
Rank	Cyclist	Nation	Time 200 m	Speed km/h	Notes
1	Maximilian Levy	Germany	10.356	69.524	Q
2	Edward Dawkins	New Zealand	+0.024		
3	Njisane Phillip	Trinidad and Tobago	+1.429		

==== First repechage heat 2 ====
Rank	Cyclist	Nation	Time 200 m	Speed km/h	Notes
1	Patrick Constable	Australia	10.363	69.477	Q
2	Damian Zieliński	Poland	+0.028		
3	Pavel Kelemen	Czech Republic	+0.378		

==== First repechage heat 3 ====
Rank	Cyclist	Nation	Time 200 m	Speed km/h	Notes
1	Fabián Puerta	Colombia	10.272	70.093	Q
2	Rafał Sarnecki	Poland	+0.086		
3	François Pervis	France	+0.607		

=== 1/8 finals ===
==== 1/8 final 1 ====
Rank	Cyclist	Nation	Time 200 m	Speed km/h	Notes
1	Jason Kenny	Great Britain	10.369	69.437	Q
2	Fabián Puerta	Colombia	+0.109		R

==== 1/8 final 2 ====
Rank	Cyclist	Nation	Time 200 m	Speed km/h	Notes
1	Callum Skinner	Great Britain	10.359	69.504	Q
2	Patrick Constable	Australia	+0.021		R

==== 1/8 final 3 ====
Rank	Cyclist	Nation	Time 200 m	Speed km/h	Notes
1	Matthew Glaetzer	Australia	10.166	70.824	Q
2	Maximilian Levy	Germany	+0.059		R

==== 1/8 final 4 ====
Rank	Cyclist	Nation	Time 200 m	Speed km/h	Notes
1	Denis Dmitriev	Russia	10.102	71.273	Q
2	Sam Webster	New Zealand	+0.142		R

==== 1/8 final 5 ====
Rank	Cyclist	Nation	Time 200 m	Speed km/h	Notes
1	Grégory Baugé	France	10.103	71.265	Q
2	Jeffrey Hoogland	Netherlands	+0.121		R

==== 1/8 final 6 ====
Rank	Cyclist	Nation	Time 200 m	Speed km/h	Notes
1	Joachim Eilers	Germany	10.449	68.906	Q
2	Xu Chao	China	+0.058		R

=== Second repechage ===
==== Second repechage heat 1 ====
Rank	Cyclist	Nation	Time 200 m	Speed km/h	Notes
1	Xu Chao	China	10.753	66.958	Q
2	Sam Webster	New Zealand	+0.048		C
3	Fabián Puerta	Colombia	+0.181		C

==== Second repechage heat 2 ====
Rank	Cyclist	Nation	Time 200 m	Speed km/h	Notes
1	Patrick Constable	Australia	10.456	68.859	Q
2	Maximilian Levy	Germany	+0.100		C
3	Jeffrey Hoogland	Netherlands	+0.118		C

=== Quarterfinals ===
==== Quarterfinal 1 ====
Rank	Cyclist	Nation	Race 1	Race 2	Race 3	Notes
1	Jason Kenny	Great Britain	10.341	10.219	—	Q
2	Patrick Constable	Australia	+0.194	+0.258	—	C

==== Quarterfinal 2 ====
Rank	Cyclist	Nation	Race 1	Race 2	Race 3	Notes
1	Callum Skinner	Great Britain	10.299	10.212	—	Q
2	Xu Chao	China	+0.122	+0.200	—	C

==== Quarterfinal 3 ====
Rank	Cyclist	Nation	Race 1	Race 2	Race 3	Notes
1	Matthew Glaetzer	Australia	10.456	10.401	—	Q
2	Joachim Eilers	Germany	+0.084	+0.049	—	C

==== Quarterfinal 4 ====
Rank	Cyclist	Nation	Race 1	Race 2	Race 3	Notes
1	Denis Dmitriev	Russia	10.202	10.166	—	Q
2	Grégory Baugé	France	+0.063	+0.213	—	C

=== Semifinals ===
==== Semifinal 1 ====
Rank	Cyclist	Nation	Race 1	Race 2	Race 3	Notes
1	Jason Kenny	Great Britain	+0.043	10.048	10.071	Q
2	Denis Dmitriev	Russia	10.139	+0.032	+0.302	B

==== Semifinal 2 ====
Rank	Cyclist	Nation	Race 1	Race 2	Race 3	Notes
1	Callum Skinner	Great Britain	10.119	10.244	—	Q
2	Matthew Glaetzer	Australia	+0.046	+0.057	—	B

=== Finals ===
==== Classification 9—12 ====
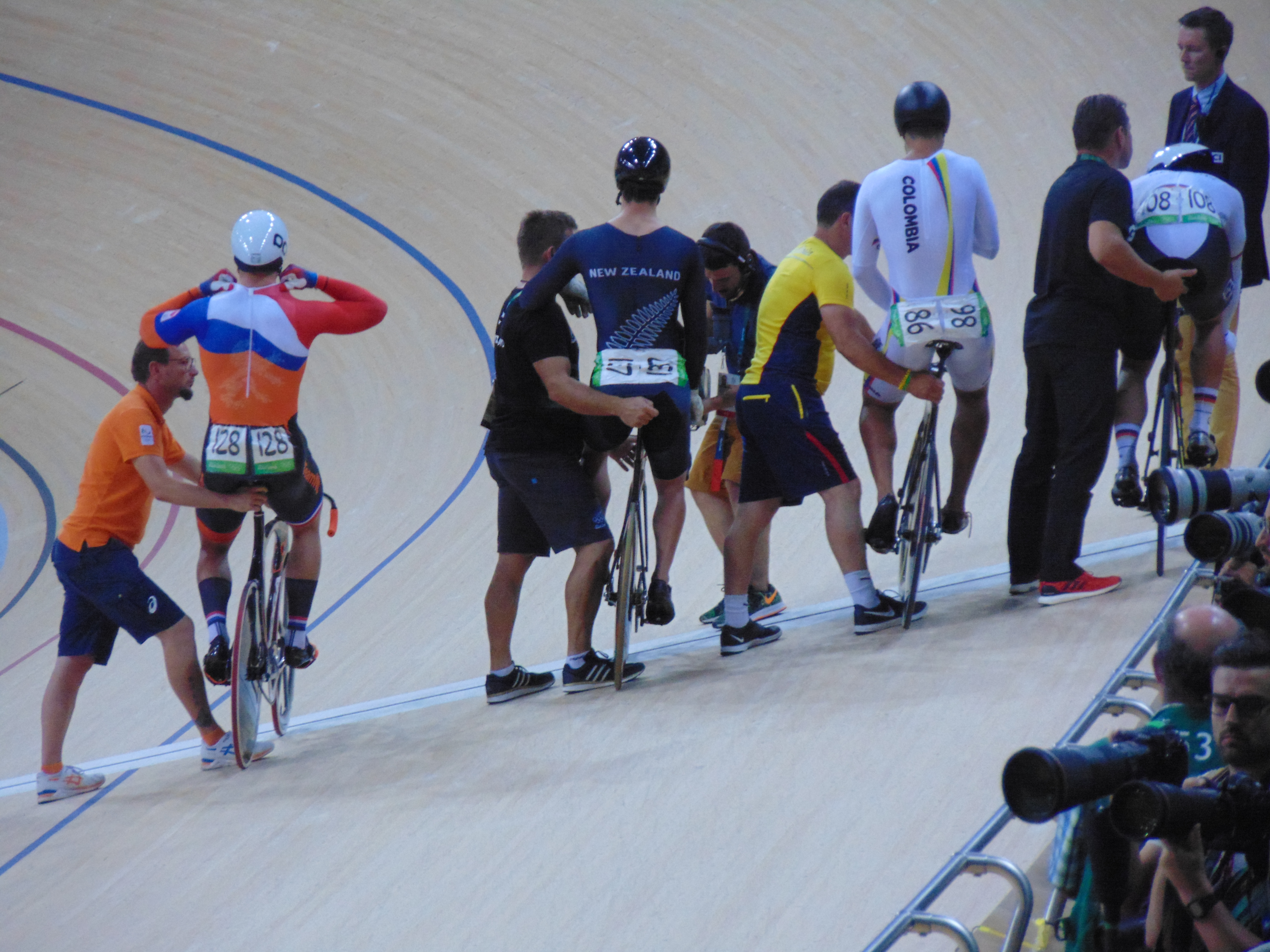
9th—12th place classifications

Rank	Cyclist	Nation	Time 200 m	Speed km/h
9	Maximilian Levy	Germany	10.275	70.072
10	Fabián Puerta	Colombia	+0.067	
11	Jeffrey Hoogland	Netherlands	+0.126	
12	Sam Webster	New Zealand	+0.329	

==== Classification 5—8 ====
Rank	Cyclist	Nation	Time 200 m	Speed km/h
5	Joachim Eilers	Germany	10.525	68.408
6	Xu Chao	China	+0.036	
7	Grégory Baugé	France	+0.153	
8	Patrick Constable	Australia	+0.215	

==== Bronze medal match ====
Rank	Cyclist	Nation	Race 1	Race 2	Race 3
3rd place, bronze medalist(s)	Denis Dmitriev	Russia	10.105	10.190	—
4	Matthew Glaetzer	Australia	+0.072	+0.044	—

==== Gold medal match ====
Rank	Cyclist	Nation	Race 1	Race 2	Race 3
1st place, gold medalist(s)	Jason Kenny	Great Britain	10.164	9.916	—
2nd place, silver medalist(s)	Callum Skinner	Great Britain	+0.113	+0.086	—

== Final classification ==
Rank	Cyclist	Nation
1st place, gold medalist(s)	Jason Kenny	Great Britain
2nd place, silver medalist(s)	Callum Skinner	Great Britain
3rd place, bronze medalist(s)	Denis Dmitriev	Russia
4	Matthew Glaetzer	Australia
5	Joachim Eilers	Germany
6	Xu Chao	China
7	Grégory Baugé	France
8	Patrick Constable	Australia
9	Maximilian Levy	Germany
10	Fabián Puerta	Colombia
11	Jeffrey Hoogland	Netherlands
12	Sam Webster	New Zealand
13	Njisane Phillip	Trinidad and Tobago
14	Damian Zieliński	Poland
15	Edward Dawkins	New Zealand
16	François Pervis	France
17	Pavel Kelemen	Czech Republic
18	Rafał Sarnecki	Poland
19	Juan Peralta Gascon	Spain
20	Kang Dong-jin	South Korea
21	Theo Bos	Netherlands
22	Im Chae-bin	South Korea
23	Santiago Ramírez	Colombia
24	Hersony Canelón	Venezuela
25	Seiichiro Nakagawa	Japan
26	Nikita Shurshin	Russia
27	César Marcano	Venezuela
