= Mikhail Iakovlev =

Israeli cyclist (born 2000)

Mikhail Yakovlev Михаил Яковлев מיכאל יעקובלב
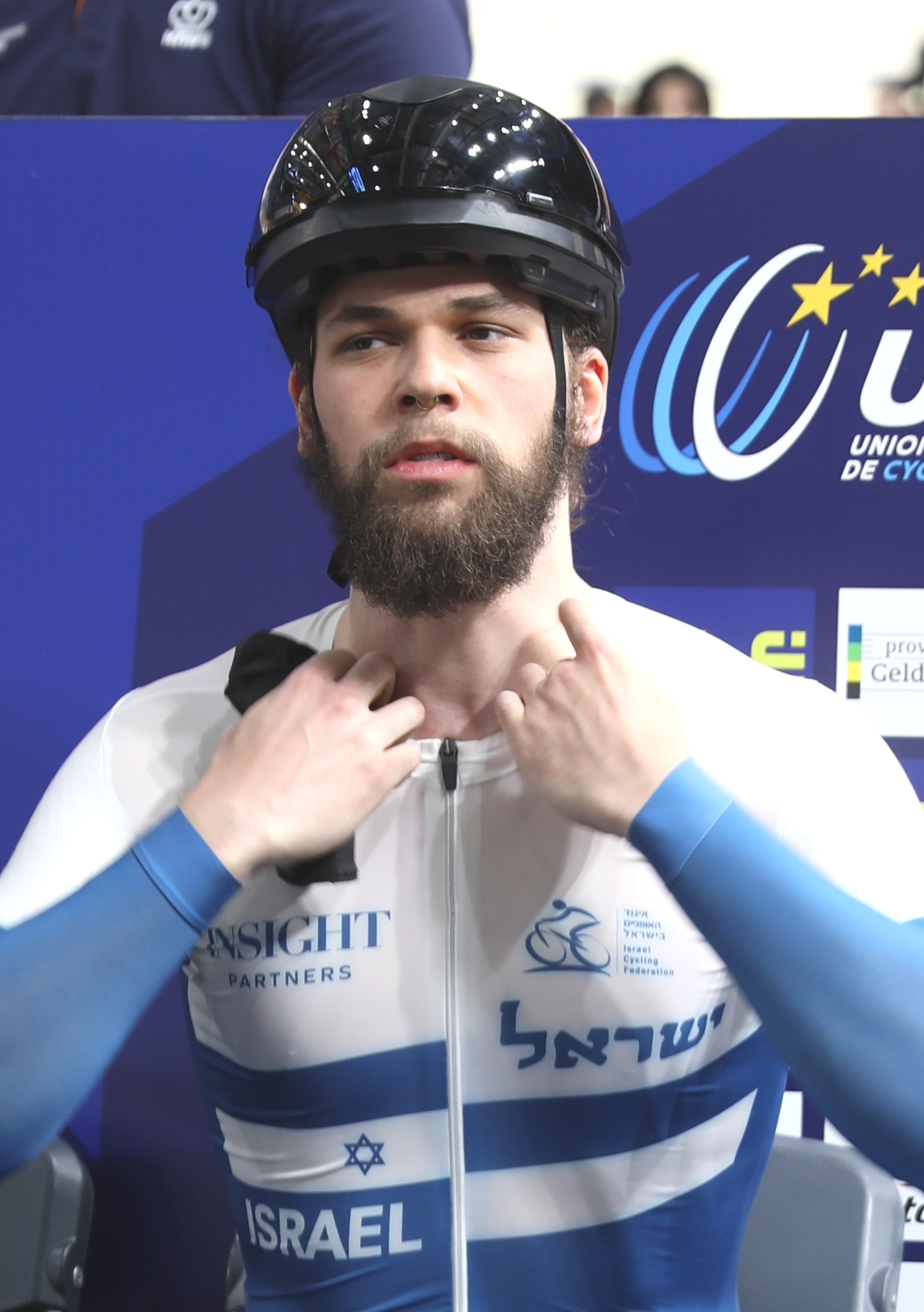
- Iakovlev at the 2024 UEC European Track Championships

Personal information
- Full name: Mikhail Sergeyevich Yakovlev
- Born: 1 September 2000 (age 26) Moscow, Russia
- Height: 199 cm (6 ft 6 in)
- Weight: 106 kg (234 lb)

Cycling career
- Sport: Cycling
- Discipline: Track
- Role: Rider
- Rider type: Sprinter

Major wins
- Unofficial World record in the 200m flying trial (9.099 seconds; 2022 Moscow Grand Prix) Please note: the world record has not been homologated and officially approved by UCI
Medal record
Men's track cycling
Representing Russian Cycling Federation
World Championships
Bronze medal – third place	2021 Roubaix	Keirin
Representing Russia
European Championships
Bronze medal – third place	2021 Grenchen	Sprint
Representing Israel
World Championships
Silver medal – second place	2024 Ballerup	Keirin
European Championships
Silver medal – second place	2025 Heusden-Zolder	Sprint
Bronze medal – third place	2024 Apeldoorn	Sprint

Mikhail Sergeyevich Yakovlev (Russian: Михаил Сергеевич Яковлев; Hebrew: מיכאיל סרגייביץ' יקובלב; born 1 September 2000), also known as Mikhail Iakovlev, is an Olympic Israeli unofficial world-record-holding racing cyclist. Born in Russia, he and his family moved to Israel, and he represents Israel internationally. He won the bronze medal in the keirin event at the 2021 UCI Track Cycling World Championships (representing Russia), and bronze medals in the Sprint at the 2021 European Championship (representing Russia), and in the 2024 European Championship (representing Israel). In 2022, Yakovlev set a new unofficial world record in the 200m flying trial in 9.099 seconds.

Iakovlev represented Israel at the 2024 Paris Olympics in cycling in the Men's sprint. In it, he came in seventh, losing to Hamish Turnbull of the United Kingdom in the 1/8 finals by 0.001 seconds. He also represented Israel in the Men's keirin, in which he came in 13th as he won his heat in the qualifiers and was eliminated in the quarter-finals. At the competition, he set an Olympic record in the men's track cycling sprint.

== Early and personal life ==
Iakovlev was born in Moscow, Russia, and is Jewish. He is Israeli and lives in Tel Aviv, Israel.

== Cycling career ==
In November 2023, UCI Track Champions League data showed Iakovlev had recorded a peak power of 2,840W, making him the most powerful sprinter on the sprint leaderboard. He is the tallest and heaviest rider in the field, at 199 cm (6 ft 6 in) and 106 kg (234 lb).

=== 2020–22; Unofficial World record, and world and European championship bronze medals ===
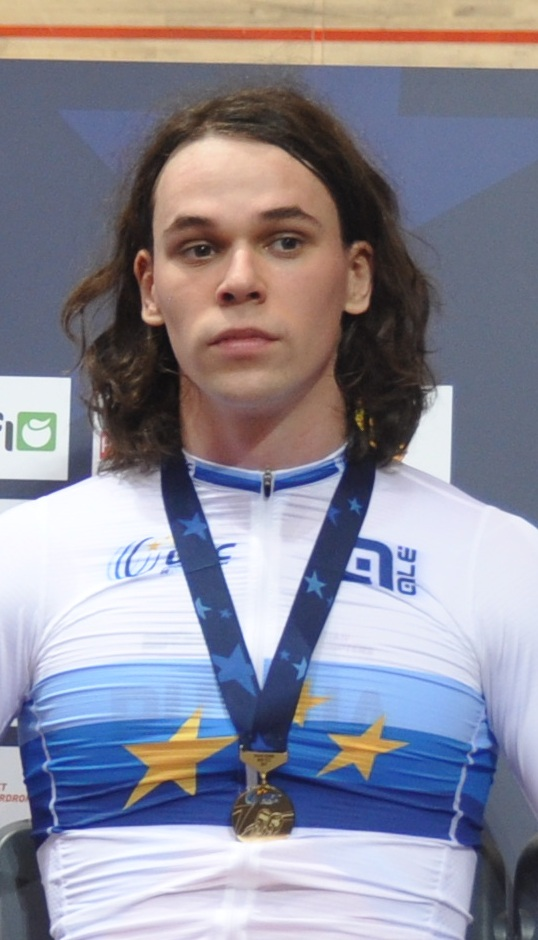
Iakovlev in 2021

In 2020, Iakovlev came in second in the European U23 Championship in Sprint, in Fiorenzuola d'Arda (Emilia-Romagna), Italy.

In 2021, he won gold medals in the European U23 Championship in both Keirin and Sprint, in Apeldoorn (Gelderland), the Netherlands, and in the Russian National Championship in Keirin, Sprint, and Team Sprint in Saint Petersburg. Iakovlev also won bronze medals in the 2021 European Championship in Sprint in Grenchen (Solothurn), Switzerland, and in the 2021 World Championship in Keirin in Roubaix (Nord-Pas-de-Calais), France, behind Dutch riders Harrie Lavreysen and Jeffrey Hoogland.

In May 2022, Iakovlev set a new unofficial world record at the Moscow Grand Prix in the 200m flying track time trial in 9.099 seconds.

=== 2022–present; European championship bronze medal ===
In August 2022, at 21 years of age, Iakovlev moved to Israel and became an Israeli citizen. His sister, parents, and grandmother also moved to Israel two months later, and live in Karmiel near Israel's northern border. Even before he emigrated to Israel, he shared photos of the Israeli and Ukrainian flags on his social media. He said: "I am Jewish, and want to represent the Jewish people. I am not interested in whether Russia wants me back."

In November 2023, Iakovlev received clearance from the International Olympic Committee to represent Israel at the 2024 Summer Olympics, after the Russian Olympic Committee, which had blocked his release, was suspended. The Russian national track cycling team coach, Sergey Kovpanets, said, "It is a shame that we lose such a talented rider like Mikhail."

In February 2023, Iakovlev won a bronze medal for Israel at the 2023 International Cycling Union (UCI) Track Nations Cup in Jakarta, Indonesia. It was the first time an Israeli athlete took the podium in a competition in Indonesia, with the Israeli national uniform and the Israeli flag flying next to his name, as in the past, the Muslim country had forbidden it. In both Keirin and Sprint, he then won gold medals in the Israeli National Championship in March. He also won a silver medal in the third round of the Nations Cup, in Cairo, Egypt, in Sprint, behind Harrie Lavreysen in the Sprint competition. He said, "For me, when I stood on the podium with the flag and the Star of David on my clothes, it felt the most natural in the world. It was as if I were born into it."

In 2024, Iakovlev won the bronze medal in the 2024 European Championship in Sprint, in Apeldoorn (Gelderland), the Netherlands, behind Harrie Lavreysen and Polish cyclist Mateusz Rudyk, while defeating Jeffrey Hoogland in the bronze medal race. It was Israel's first-ever medal in track cycling at the European Championships. In March 2024, he won the Israeli National Championship in Keirin and Sprint, for the second straight year.

=== 2024 Paris Olympics; Olympic sprint record ===
Iakovlev represented Israel at the 2024 Paris Olympics in cycling. In the Men's sprint, he came in seventh, losing to team sprint silver medalist Hamish Turnbull of the United Kingdom in the third round, 1/8 finals by 0.001 seconds. At 23 years of age, he set an Olympic record in the men's track cycling sprint at the competition, with a time of 9.152 seconds.

He also competed in the Men's keirin, and won his heat in the qualifiers well ahead of 2023 world champion Kevin Quintero of Colombia and four other riders. He came in 13th in the competition, as he next competed in the quarter-finals, where he was eliminated.

== See also ==
- List of Jews in cycling
- List of world records in track cycling
- List of European records in track cycling
- List of Israeli records in track cycling
- List of World Championship medalists in men's keirin
- List of European Championship medalists in men's sprint
- List of Track Cycling Nations Cup medalists
- Olympic record progression in track cycling Men's flying 200 m time trial
