= List of Israeli records in track cycling =

The following are the national records in track cycling in Israel maintained by the Israel Cycling Federation (איגוד האופניים בישראל).

== Men ==
Event	Record	Athlete	Date	Meet	Place	Ref
Flying 200m time trial	9.152	Mikhail Iakovlev	7 August 2024	Olympic Games	Saint-Quentin-en-Yvelines, France	
Team sprint	49.905	Shaked Frank; Mikhail Iakovlev; Vladislav Loginov	24 March 2025	Israeli Championships	Tel Aviv, Israel	
1km time trial	1:07.154	Iftah Shoshani	5 December 2020	Israeli Championships	Tel Aviv, Israel	
4000m individual pursuit	4:31.594	Alon Yogev	5 March 2025	Israeli Championships	Tel Aviv, Israel	
4000m team pursuit	4:48.318	Noam Haim; Benjamin Vaniche; Or Dayan; Vladislav Loginov	24 March 2025	Israeli Championships	Tel Aviv, Israel	
Hour record	43.567 km	Roei Mizrahi	30 June 2023		Tel Aviv, Israel	

== Women ==
Event	Record	Athlete	Date	Meet	Place	Ref
Flying 200m time trial	13.449	Tamar Bezalel	2 March 2023	Pre-national championships competition	Tel Aviv, Israel	
500m time trial	37.232	Gali Wallach	5 December 2020	Israeli Championships	Tel Aviv, Israel	
1km time trial	1:27.336	Emunah Altshul	7 March 2025	Israeli Championships	Tel Aviv, Israel	
Team sprint (750 m)	59.197	Aviv Dunsky; Noa Shweky; Tamar Bezalel	24 March 2025	Israeli Championships	Tel Aviv, Israel	
3000m individual pursuit	4:01.844	Gali Wallach	3 December 2020	Israeli Championships	Tel Aviv, Israel	
4000m individual pursuit	5:38.851	Diana Egerton-Warburton	1 July 2026	Israeli Championships	Tel Aviv, Israel	
4000m team pursuit	5:26.774	Aviv Dunsky; Hagar Lahav; Noa Shweky; Tamar Bezalel	24 March 2025	Israeli Championships	Tel Aviv, Israel	
