= Commonwealth Games records =

Best performances in specific editions of the event's history

Commonwealth Games records are the best performances in a specific edition of the event's history. As the Commonwealth Games only accepts athletes from the Commonwealth of Nations, the records are not considered as prestigious as World records or Olympic records. Nevertheless, they are considered important achievements in the careers of the athletes who are able to break or tie them.

The Commonwealth Games Federation recognizes records only for certain events of certain sports. These include:

- Archery
- Athletics (list)
- Cycling (list)
- Rowing (list)
- Shooting (list)
- Swimming (list)
- Tenpin bowling
- Weightlifting (list)

== See also ==
- Olympic record
