= Madison Janssen =

Australian cyclist

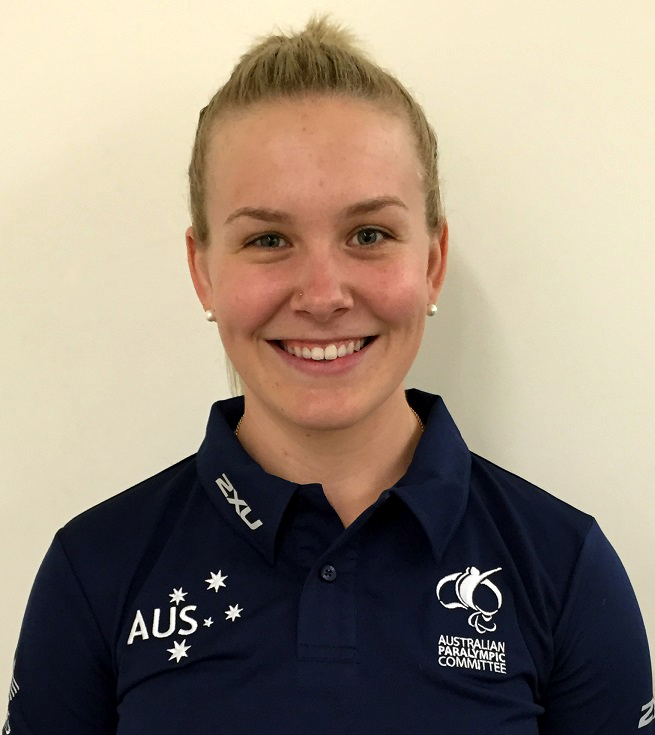
- 2016 Australian Paralympic team portrait

Personal information
- Nickname: Maddie
- Born: 13 November 1994 (age 31) Gold Coast

Sport
- Country: Australia
- Sport: Track Cycling
- Club: Gold Coast Cycling Club
Medal record
Women's cycling
Representing Australia
UCI BMX World Championships
Gold medal – first place	2013 Auckland	17 and over women
Silver medal – second place	2003 Perth	9 girls
Silver medal – second place	2008 Taiyuan	14 girls
UCI Para-cycling Track World Championships
Gold medal – first place	2016 Montichiari	Women's sprint B
Bronze medal – third place	2016 Montichiari	Women's 1 km time trial B
Silver medal – second place	2018 Rio	Women's 1 km Time Trial B
Silver medal – second place	2018 Rio	Women's Sprint B
Summer Paralympic Games
Bronze medal – third place	2016 Rio de Janeiro	Women's 1 km Time Trial B

Madison Janssen (born 13 November 1994) is an Australian cyclist. She is a world champion, multiple national champion and a world record holder. In May 2016 she was named as part of the Australian cycling team as the sighted pilot for Jessica Gallagher for the 2016 Summer Paralympics in Rio, where they won a bronze medal in the Women's 1000m time trial.

== Personal ==
Madison Janssen was born in Queensland on 13 November 1994, the youngest of three children. She began BMX riding when she was five years old, after seeing her father and brother playing around on bicycles.

== Career ==
She won national championships in her age division in 2004, 2007 and 2008. She was runner-up at the UCI BMX World Championships in her age division in 2003 in Perth, and 2008 in Taiyuan, China, before winning in the 17 and over division at the 2013 UCI BMX World Championships in Auckland in 2013.

Janssen decided to switch to track cycling. On 18 May 2015, she received a call from Glenn Doney, the head coach at the Victorian Institute of Sport, who informed her that the visually impaired Paralympic athlete and skier Jessica Gallagher intended to qualify for the 2016 Summer Paralympics in Rio de Janeiro as a track cyclist, and needed a tandem bicycle pilot. Janssen later recalled her first ride with Gallagher:

I've only ridden a boarded track three times. I was a little nervous, then having to go on it on the tandem, made me even more nervous, then putting Jess on the back – even more terrifying – THEN Glenn decided our first effort would be a flying 200 m, let's just say I was on a whole new level of scared, this was probably the most scariest thing I had ever done.

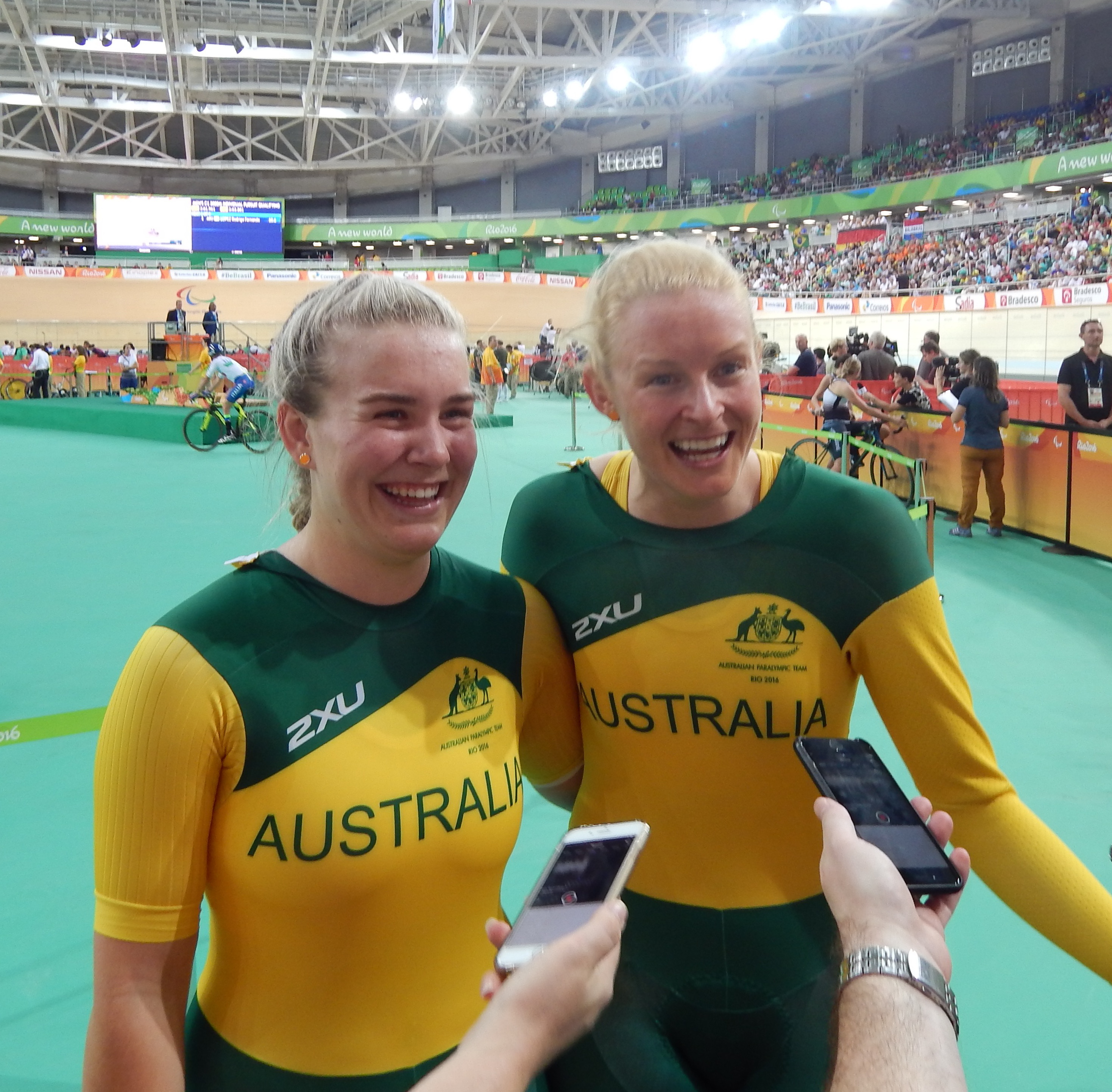
Janssen (left) and Jessica Gallagher (right) are all smiles after winning a bronze medal in the Women's B/VI 1000m time trial final

At the national championships in Adelaide in December 2015, they won the women's 1 km tandem event in a time of 1:09.597, inside the 1:10 qualifying time for the world championships. The next step was the 2016 UCI Para-cycling Track World Championships in Montichiari in Italy in March 2016. In the women's tandem 1 km time trial they posted a time of 1:07.575, which was good enough to win bronze. The following day they beat British defending world champions Sophie Thornhill and Helen Scott in the flying 200 m event in a world record time of 11.045 seconds, breaking the record of 11.112 seconds set by Brandie O'Connor and Breanna Hargrave in April 2014. Their selection for the 2016 Summer Paralympics in Rio de Janeiro was announced on 30 May 2016. On 9 September they won a bronze medal in the Women's 1000m time trial.

On 5 March 2017, Janssen came second in the Keirin at the 2017 Australian Track Championships.

At the 2018 UCI Para-cycling Road World Championships, Rio de Janeiro, Brazil, Janssen piloted Jessica Gallagher to silver medals in the Women's Tandem Time Trial and Sprint.
