= Callum Skinner =

Scottish track cyclist

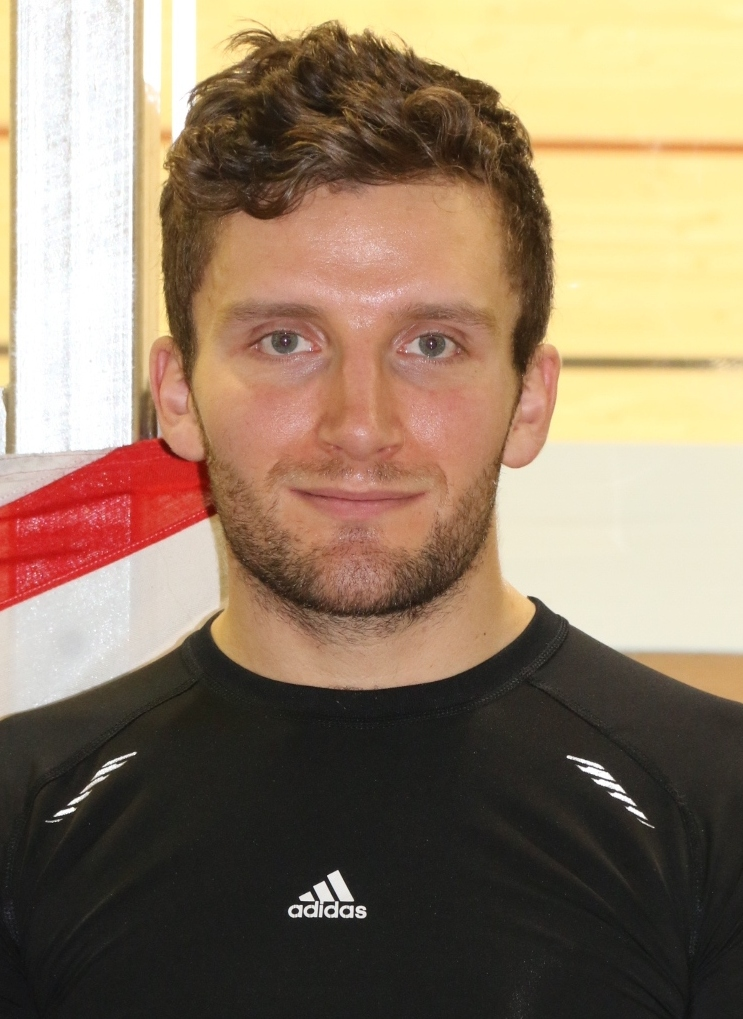
- Skinner (2017)

Personal information
- Born: 20 August 1992 (age 34) Glasgow, Scotland
- Height: 1.87 m (6 ft 2 in)
- Weight: 93 kg (205 lb)

Cycling career
- Sport: Cycling
- Discipline: Track
- Role: Rider
- Rider type: Sprinter
Medal record
Men's track cycling
Representing Great Britain
Olympic Games
Gold medal – first place	2016 Rio de Janeiro	Team sprint
Silver medal – second place	2016 Rio de Janeiro	Sprint
European Championships
Gold medal – first place	2014 Guadeloupe	1 km time trial
Bronze medal – third place	2012 Panevėžys	Team sprint
European Under-23 Championships
Silver medal – second place	2011 Anadia	Team sprint
Bronze medal – third place	2011 Anadia	Sprint
Representing Scotland
Commonwealth Games
Bronze medal – third place	2018 Gold Coast	1 km time trial

Callum Skinner (born 20 August 1992) is a British former track cyclist. He won the silver medal in the individual sprint at the 2016 Summer Olympics, and was a member of the British team that won gold in the team sprint.

== Early life ==
Skinner was born to mother Judith and father Scott, the elder of two boys with a younger brother, Roy in Glasgow, Scotland. He moved to Bruntsfield, Edinburgh at the age of 12 and attended James Gillespie's High School. His academic career was hampered by dyslexia. He took up cycling in 2004, inspired by Chris Hoy's success in the sport at the 2004 Summer Olympics in Athens.

In 2008 he was national youth champion and broke Hoy's British 200 m record for his age group. Later that year he was the inaugural winner of the Chris Hoy Trophy, an award presented to Edinburgh's most promising young track cyclist, and received the award from Hoy himself.

== Career ==
In 2010 Skinner joined British Cycling's Senior Academy. Skinner competed representing Scotland in the team sprint at the 2010 Commonwealth Games, finishing fourth. The following year he took two medals at the Under-23 European Track Championships, winning a bronze in the individual sprint and a silver in the team sprint alongside Peter Mitchell and Philip Hindes. He did not get the opportunity to compete at the 2012 Summer Olympics in London due to a lump in his neck in late 2011 which doctors initially thought was lymphoma. Biopsies later proved that the lump was not cancerous but the scare had caused him to take time away from the sport. He was subsequently promoted to the British Cycling Olympic Podium Programme in 2013.

In January 2014 he won his first World Cup medal, placing third in the team sprint in Guadalajara, and once again represented Scotland at the Commonwealth Games. He came to prominence at the 2014 British National Track Championships, winning a clean sweep of four national sprint titles. In October 2014, he became European champion in the 1 km time trial.

In January 2016 Skinner was a member of the team that won the overall title for the men's team sprint at the UCI Track Cycling World Cup in Hong Kong. In March he finished eighth in the individual sprint in the 2016 UCI Track Cycling World Championships in London.

At the 2016 Summer Olympics he was part of the team that won gold in the men's team sprint along with Philip Hindes and Jason Kenny, setting an Olympic record of 42.440 in the final against New Zealand. He won the silver medal in the men's individual sprint, beating Matthew Glaetzer 2–0 in the semi-final but he was beaten 2–0 by defending champion Kenny in an all-British final.

In a 2020 interview, Skinner stated that his mental health declined after the 2016 Olympics, culminating in what he described as a "mental breakdown" during the 2018 Commonwealth Games after he was disqualified from the keirin, although he did go on to take a medal in the kilometer time trial. He said that in 2019 he disclosed his mental health issues to a senior person at British Cycling, but that the official in question refused his request for time off to recover: he reflected that "that conversation finished me as a cyclist".

In February 2019 it was announced that Skinner had been appointed to the position of Lead Athlete with Global Athlete, a self-described "athlete-led movement for change" aiming to advance the interests of sportspeople: in this role he would be responsible for recruiting other athletes to the organisation. The following month he announced his retirement from competition in order to focus on advocating improvements in sportspeople's rights and working conditions. He also supports equality for LGBTQ athletes: both his father and brother are gay.

== Major results ==
2011
UEC European Track Championships (under-23 & junior)

2nd Team sprint (with Peter Mitchell and Philip Hindes)
3rd Sprint

2014
1st Kilo, UEC European Track Championships
National Track Championships

1st Kilo
1st Keirin
1st Sprint
1st Team Sprint (with Philip Hindes & Jason Kenny)

2013–2014 Track Cycling World Cup

3rd Team Sprint, Round 3

2014–15 Track Cycling World Cup

1st Team sprint (with Philip Hindes and Jason Kenny), Round 1

2016
Olympic Games

1st Team sprint
2nd Sprint

2015–16 Track Cycling World Cup

1st Team sprint (with Philip Hindes and Jason Kenny), Round 4

2017
2017–18 Track Cycling World Cup

2nd Team sprint (with Jack Carlin and Philip Hindes), Round 3
3rd 1km time trial, Round 2

2018
3rd 1km time trial, Commonwealth Games

== See also ==
- City of Edinburgh Racing Club
- Achievements of members of City of Edinburgh Racing Club
