= Sophie Thornhill =

English cyclist (born 1996)

Sophie Thornhill MBE
Personal information
- Born: 9 February 1996 (age 30) Poynton, Cheshire, England
- Height: 5 ft 5 in (165 cm)
- Weight: 60 kg (132 lb)

Cycling career
- Sport: Cycling
- Current team: Boot Out Breast Cancer
- Discipline: Track
- Role: Stoker
- Rider type: Sprinter

Amateur team
- SportCity Velo

Professional team
- Boot Out Breast Cancer
Medal record
Women's para track cycling
Representing Great Britain
Paralympic Games
Gold medal – first place	2016 Rio de Janeiro	Tandem B kilo
Bronze medal – third place	2016 Rio de Janeiro	Tandem B pursuit
World Championships
Gold medal – first place	2014 Aguascalientes	Tandem B kilo
Gold medal – first place	2014 Aguascalientes	Tandem B sprint
Gold medal – first place	2015 Apeldoorn	Tandem B kilo
Gold medal – first place	2015 Apeldoorn	Tandem B sprint
Gold medal – first place	2017 Los Angeles	Tandem B kilo
Gold medal – first place	2017 Los Angeles	Tandem B pursuit
Gold medal – first place	2017 Los Angeles	Tandem B sprint
Gold medal – first place	2018 Rio de Janeiro	Tandem B kilo
Gold medal – first place	2018 Rio de Janeiro	Tandem B sprint
Gold medal – first place	2019 Apeldoorn	Tandem B kilo
Gold medal – first place	2019 Apeldoorn	Tandem B sprint
Gold medal – first place	2020 Milton	Tandem B kilo
Gold medal – first place	2020 Milton	Tandem B sprint
Silver medal – second place	2016 Montichiari	Tandem B kilo
Silver medal – second place	2016 Montichiari	Tandem B sprint
Representing England
Commonwealth Games
Gold medal – first place	2014 Glasgow	Tandem B sprint
Gold medal – first place	2014 Glasgow	Tandem B kilo
Gold medal – first place	2018 Gold Coast	Tandem B sprint
Gold medal – first place	2018 Gold Coast	Tandem B kilo

Sophie Thornhill (born 9 February 1996) is a visually impaired English former racing cyclist who competed in para-cycling tandem track events. She is a double world champion, with pilot Rachel James, and a double Commonwealth gold medallist, with pilot Helen Scott, in the tandem sprint and 1 km time trial events. In April 2014, she set world records in the tandem sprint and 1 km time trial, piloted by James. She retired from competition in 2020.

== Biography ==
Thornhill comes from Poynton near Stockport in Cheshire. She attended Poynton High School, also attended by para-cyclist Sarah Storey, and Loughborough College. She has only 7–9% vision owing to oculocutaneous albinism, which causes visual impairment. She met the para-cyclist Anthony Kappes, also visually impaired, via her uncle; he encouraged her to train as a track cyclist.

Thornhill started racing as an adult in May 2013, aged 17. She raced as the stoker on the back of a tandem, with the front position occupied by a pilot with normal vision. She was initially piloted by English cyclist Helen Scott, with whom she won three British events. In September 2013, she switched to the Welsh cyclist Rachel James as her pilot. Her international debut came with James in December at the International Paracycling Cup in Newport, Wales, where the pair won two gold medals; their time of 1:09.446 in the 1 km time trial missed the world record by 0.73 seconds.

Her first major international competition was the UCI Para-cycling Track World Championships in Aguascalientes, Mexico, in April 2014. Thornhill and James won the gold medal in the tandem 1 km time trial; their time of 1:05.912 broke the world record by a little under 3 seconds. The pair won gold in the sprint, beating the New Zealand pair Emma Foy and Laura Fairweather 2–0 in the semi-final, and the Australian pair Brandie O'Connor and Breanna Hargrave 2–0 in the final. They also broke the world record in the qualifying round of the sprint with a flying start time over 200 metres of 10.854 seconds.

Thornhill was selected for the English team at the 2014 Commonwealth Games in Glasgow, Scotland, where para-cycling appeared for the first time; at 18, she was the track cycling team's youngest member. As James was competing for the Welsh team, Thornhill returned to Scott as her pilot to compete in the tandem sprint and 1 km time trial events. The pair won the gold medal in the sprint, beating the Australian Paralympic champion Felicity Johnson and pilot Holly Takos 2–0 in the semi-final, and the Scottish pair Aileen McGlynn and Louise Haston 2–0 in the final. They set the Commonwealth record during qualification, with a time of 11.277 seconds. The pair also won gold in the 1 km time trial, with a time of 1:08.187, a Commonwealth Games record. They beat silver medallists McGlynn and Haston by more than 1.5 seconds. Sarah Storey commented: "They had a superbly executed start – they have worked so hard on that aspect of their training – and with the turbo intervals they have done they were able to bring it home strongly."

Thornhill reunited with James to compete in the 2014 British National Track Championships in September, where they won the mixed time trial and the 200-metre flying start time trial for blind and visually impaired riders.

At the 2016 Rio Paralympics Thornhill won gold in the 1km time trial B and bronze in the individual pursuit B, on both occasions alongside Helen Scott.

She was appointed Member of the Order of the British Empire (MBE) in the 2017 New Year Honours for services to cycling.

In June 2020, Thornhill announced her retirement from competition, after the 2020 Summer Paralympics were delayed by a year due to the COVID-19 pandemic. She indicated that she would focus on her educational career, taking up a place to study history at Manchester Metropolitan University in September.

== Palmarès ==
2014
1st Tandem B 1km time trial, UCI Para-cycling Track World Championships (with Rachel James)
1st Tandem B sprint, UCI Para-cycling Track World Championships (with Rachel James)
1st Tandem B sprint, 2014 Commonwealth Games (with Helen Scott)
1st Tandem B 1km time trial, 2014 Commonwealth Games (with Helen Scott)
1st Para Cycling BVI mixed time trial, British National Track Championships (with Rachel James)
1st Para Cycling BVI 200m flying start time trial, British National Track Championships (with Rachel James)

2015
1st Tandem B sprint, UCI Para-cycling Track World Championships (with Helen Scott)
1st Para Cycling BVI 200m mixed standing start time trial, British National Track Championships (with Helen Scott)
1st Para Cycling BVI 200m flying start time trial, British National Track Championships (with Helen Scott)
