= Track cycling at the 2026 Commonwealth Games – Men's 1 km time trial C1–3 =

Cycling Track – Men's time trial C1-3 at the 2026 Commonwealth Games
- Venue: Sir Chris Hoy Velodrome
- Dates: 31 July
- Competitors: 6 from 6 nations
- Winning time: 1:05.546

Medalists
gold medal	Devon Briggs	New Zealand
silver medal	Gordon Allan	Australia
bronze medal	Finlay Graham	Scotland

The men's time trial C1–3 at the 2026 Commonwealth Games was part of the cycling programme, and took place on 31 July 2026. The event was new on the Commonwealth Games schedule, and was won by New Zealand cyclist Devon Briggs.

== Records ==
Prior to this competition, the existing world records were as follows:

World records - Men's 1 km time trial C
C1	Li Zhangyu (CHN)	1:08.347	Izu (Japan)	27 August 2021
C2	Alexandre Leaute (FRA)	1:07.944	Saint Quentin (France)	1 September 2024
C3	Jaco van Gass (GBR)	1:04.825	Saint Quentin (France)	1 September 2024

== Schedule ==
The schedule was as follows:

All times are British Summer Time (UTC+1)

Date	Time	Round
Friday 31 July 2026	17:15	Finals

== Results ==
The C1–3 time trial was a factored event, with the actual time of each cyclist multiplied by a factor consistent with their classification to allow for fair competition between classifications. The unfactored results counted for world and Games records within each classification. The results of the men's time trial C1–3 were therefore as follows:

Rank	Name	Country	Actual time	Classification	Factor (%)	Factored time
1st place, gold medalist(s)	Devon Briggs	New Zealand	1:05.536; C3 GR	C3	100	1:05.536
2nd place, silver medalist(s)	Gordon Allan	Australia	1:11.282; C2 GR	C2	94.5	1:07.361
3rd place, bronze medalist(s)	Finlay Graham	Scotland	1:07.527	C3	100	1:07.527
4	Mohamad Yusof Hafizi Shaharuddin	Malaysia	1:14.547; C1 GR	C1	92.1	1:08.658
5	Chris Burns	Northern Ireland	1:13.836	C2	94.5	1:09.775
6	Matthew Robertson	England	1:14.373	C2	94.5	1:10.282
