= Cycling at the 2014 Commonwealth Games =

- Dates: 24 July – 3 August 2014
- Host city: Glasgow, Scotland
- Events: 23
- Records set: –

Cycling at the 2014 Commonwealth Games was the 19th appearance of Cycling at the Commonwealth Games. The Cycling competition is one of seven optional sports that were included in the 2014 Commonwealth Games in Glasgow. Cycling has appeared consistently since their first appearance at the 1934 British Empire Games in London with track and road events at every Games since and mountain biking being included from 2002.

The track cycling events were hosted at the newly built Sir Chris Hoy Velodrome in Glasgow's East End, whilst the mountain bike competitions utilised the purpose-built Cathkin Braes Mountain Bike Trails. The road race and time trial events took place on public road circuits in Glasgow City Centre and North Lanarkshire respectively, with both starting and finishing at Glasgow Green.

== Medal summary ==
=== Medal table ===
* Host nation (Scotland)

| Rank | Nation | Gold | Silver | Bronze | Total |
|---|---|---|---|---|---|
| 1 | Australia | 7 | 9 | 8 | 24 |
| 2 | England | 6 | 5 | 3 | 14 |
| 3 | New Zealand | 6 | 4 | 5 | 15 |
| 4 | Scotland* | 2 | 2 | 1 | 5 |
| 5 | Wales | 1 | 1 | 3 | 5 |
| 6 | Canada | 1 | 1 | 1 | 3 |
| 7 | Isle of Man | 0 | 1 | 0 | 1 |
| 8 | Malaysia | 0 | 0 | 1 | 1 |
| 8 | South Africa | 0 | 0 | 1 | 1 |
| Totals (9 entries) | | 23 | 23 | 23 | 69 |

=== Road ===
| Event | Gold | Silver | Bronze |
|---|---|---|---|
| Men's road race | Geraint Thomas; Wales | Jack Bauer; New Zealand | Scott Thwaites; England |
| Men's time trial | Alex Dowsett; England | Rohan Dennis; Australia | Geraint Thomas; Wales |
| Women's road race | Lizzie Armitstead; England | Emma Pooley; England | Ashleigh Moolman Pasio; South Africa |
| Women's time trial | Linda Villumsen; New Zealand | Emma Pooley; England | Katrin Garfoot; Australia |

=== Mountain bike ===
| Event | Gold | Silver | Bronze |
|---|---|---|---|
| Men's cross country | Anton Cooper; New Zealand | Sam Gaze; New Zealand | Daniel McConnell; Australia |
| Women's cross country | Catharine Pendrel; Canada | Emily Batty; Canada | Rebecca Henderson; Australia |

=== Track ===
| Event | Gold | Silver | Bronze |
|---|---|---|---|
| Men's keirin | Matthew Glaetzer; Australia | Sam Webster; New Zealand | Mohd Azizulhasni Awang; Malaysia |
| Men's points race | Thomas Scully; New Zealand | Peter Kennaugh; Isle of Man | Aaron Gate; New Zealand |
| Men's individual pursuit | Jack Bobridge; Australia | Alex Edmondson; Australia | Marc Ryan; New Zealand |
| Men's team pursuit | Australia; Jack Bobridge; Luke Davison; Alex Edmondson; Glenn O'Shea | England; Steven Burke; Ed Clancy; Andy Tennant; Bradley Wiggins | New Zealand; Shane Archbold; Pieter Bulling; Marc Ryan; Dylan Kennett |
| Men's scratch race | Shane Archbold; New Zealand | Glenn O'Shea; Australia | Rémi Pelletier-Roy; Canada |
| Men's sprint | Sam Webster; New Zealand | Jason Kenny; England | Eddie Dawkins; New Zealand |
| Men's team sprint | New Zealand; Edward Dawkins; Ethan Mitchell; Sam Webster | England; Philip Hindes; Jason Kenny; Kian Emadi | Australia; Matthew Glaetzer; Nathan Hart; Shane Perkins |
| Men's 1 km time trial | Scott Sunderland; Australia | Simon van Velthooven; New Zealand | Matt Archibald; New Zealand |
| Women's points race | Laura Trott; England | Elinor Barker; Wales | Katie Archibald; Scotland |
| Women's individual pursuit | Joanna Rowsell; England | Annette Edmondson; Australia | Amy Cure; Australia |
| Women's scratch race | Annette Edmondson; Australia | Amy Cure; Australia | Elinor Barker; Wales |
| Women's sprint | Stephanie Morton; Australia | Anna Meares; Australia | Jessica Varnish; England |
| Women's 500m time trial | Anna Meares; Australia | Stephanie Morton; Australia | Jessica Varnish; England |

=== Para-track ===
| Event | Gold | Silver | Bronze |
|---|---|---|---|
| Men's tandem sprint B | Scotland; Neil Fachie; Craig MacLean (pilot) | Australia; Kieran Modra; Jason Niblett (pilot) | Australia; Paul Kennedy; Thomas Clarke (pilot) |
| Men's tandem 1 km time trial B | Scotland; Neil Fachie; Craig MacLean (pilot) | Australia; Kieran Modra; Jason Niblett (pilot) | Wales; Matt Ellis; Ieuan Williams (pilot) |
| Women's tandem sprint B | England; Sophie Thornhill; Helen Scott (pilot) | Scotland; Aileen McGlynn; Louise Haston (pilot) | Australia; Brandie O'Connor; Breanna Hargreave (pilot) |
| Women's tandem 1 km time trial B | England; Sophie Thornhill; Helen Scott (pilot) | Scotland; Aileen McGlynn; Louise Haston (pilot) | Australia; Brandie O'Connor; Breanna Hargreave (pilot) |

== Schedule ==
All times are British Summer Time (UTC+1). All event times are subject to change.

| Date | Time | Event |
|---|---|---|
| Thursday 24 July | 11:00–13:45 | Men's Sprint: Preliminary |
| Thursday 24 July | 11:00–13:45 | Men's 4000m Team Pursuit: Preliminary |
| Thursday 24 July | 11:00–13:45 | Para-Sport Event: Women's Sprint B (Tandem): Preliminary & Semi-Finals |
| Thursday 24 July | 16:00–18:45 | Men's Team Sprint: Preliminary & Final |
| Thursday 24 July | 16:00–18:45 | Men's 4000m Team Pursuit |
| Thursday 24 July | 16:00–18:45 | Para-Sport Event: Women's Sprint B (Tandem) |
| Friday 25 July | 11:00–13:30 | Men's 4000m Individual Pursuit: Preliminary & Final |
| Friday 25 July | 11:00–13:30 | Men's Sprint: Quarter-Finals |
| Friday 25 July | 11:00–13:30 | Women's 3000m Individual Pursuit: Preliminary |
| Friday 25 July | 16:00–18:30 | Men's Sprint: Semi-Finals & Final |
| Friday 25 July | 16:00–18:30 | Para-Sport Event: Men's 1000m Time Trial B (Tandem) |
| Friday 25 July | 16:00–18:30 | Men's 4000m Individual Pursuit |
| Friday 25 July | 16:00–18:30 | Women's 3000m Individual Pursuit |
| Saturday 26 July | 11:00–13:30 | Para-Sport Event: Men's Sprint B (Tandem): Preliminary & Semi-Finals |
| Saturday 26 July | 11:00–13:30 | Men's 40 km Points Race: Preliminary |
| Saturday 26 July | 11:00–13:30 | Women's Sprint: Preliminary & Quarter-Finals |
| Saturday 26 July | 16:00–19:30 | Para-Sport Event: Men's Sprint B (Tandem) |
| Saturday 26 July | 16:00–19:30 | Men's 1000m Time Trial |
| Saturday 26 July | 16:00–19:30 | Men's 40 km Points Race |
| Saturday 26 July | 16:00–19:30 | Women's Sprint: Semi-Finals & Classification Races (7th & 5th Place) |
| Saturday 26 July | 16:00–19:30 | Women's 10 km Scratch Race |
| Sunday 27 July | 15:00–19:30 | Men's Keirin: Preliminary, Semi-Finals, Final |
| Sunday 27 July | 15:00–19:30 | Men's 20 km Scratch Race: Preliminary & Final |
| Sunday 27 July | 15:00–19:30 | Para-Sport Event: Women's 1000m Time Trial B (Tandem) |
| Sunday 27 July | 15:00–19:30 | Women's Sprint: Bronze and Gold Medal Races |
| Sunday 27 July | 15:00–19:30 | Women's 25 km Points Race |
| Tuesday 29 July | 11:30–16:00 | Men's Cross-Country Mountain Bike |
| Tuesday 29 July | 11:30–16:00 | Women's Cross-Country Mountain Bike |
| Thursday 31 July | 10:00–15:30 | Men's Individual Time Trial |
| Thursday 31 July | 10:00–15:30 | Women's Individual Time Trial |
| Sunday 3 August | 08:30–17:00 | Men's Road Race |
| Sunday 3 August | 08:30–17:00 | Women's Road Race |
