= Louise Haston =

Scottish cyclist

Personal information
- Born: 24 August 1980 (age 46) South Queensferry, Scotland

Cycling career
- Sport: Cycling
- Discipline: Tandem
- Role: Pilot
- Rider type: Sprint

Amateur team
- 2009-2013: City of Edinburgh RC

Professional team
- 2014–: Team Scotland
Medal record
Representing Scotland
Women's track cycling
Commonwealth Games
Silver medal – second place	2014 Glasgow	Sprint (B&VI)
Silver medal – second place	2014 Glasgow	Kilo (B&VI)

Louise Haston (born 24 August 1980) is a Scottish paralympic tandem cyclist, piloting Aileen McGlynn.

== Biography ==
Haston originally took part in athletics, but following a knee injury in 2009, decided to switch to cycling in 2009, through the gold4glasgow programme. Since then, she has gone on to represent Great Britain at a World Cup event and world championships, piloting a tandem with both Aileen McGlynn and Lora Turnham.

Haston represented Scotland at the Commonwealth Games, piloting McGlynn to win the silver medal in both tandem sprint and tandem kilo in Glasgow, 2014.
