= 2025 UCI Para-cycling Track World Championships =

Cycling world championships

- Venue: Rio de Janeiro, Brazil
- Date: 16–19 October
- Velodrome: Rio Olympic Velodrome
- Nations participating: 36
- Cyclists participating: 143+31
- Events: 48

The 2025 UCI Para-cycling Track World Championships was held from 16 to 19 October 2025 at the Rio Olympic Velodrome in Rio de Janeiro, Brazil. This will be the third edition of the event to be held in the Olympic Velodrome after 2018 and 2024. This year saw the removal of the omnium and the individual pursuit for C-classified riders, and the introduction of sprint and elimination races.

== Results ==
=== Men ===
Event	Class	Gold		Silver		Bronze	
Sprint	C1	Mohamad Shaharuddin; Malaysia		Ricardo Ten Argilés; Spain		Ivan Ermakov; Individual Neutral Athletes	
Sprint	C2	Hidde Buur; Netherlands		Gordon Allan; Australia		Alexandre Léauté; France	
Sprint	C3	Korey Boddington; Australia		Devon Briggs; New Zealand		Fin Graham; Great Britain	
Sprint	C4	Jody Cundy; Great Britain		Jarno Thierens; Belgium		Michael Shippley; Australia	
Sprint	C5	Niels Verschaeren; Belgium		Franz-Josef Lässer; Austria		Alfonso Cabello; Spain	
Sprint	B	Great Britain; James Ball; Steffan Lloyd (pilot)		Australia; Kane Perris; Luke Zaccaria (pilot)		Belgium; Milan Thomas; Mathias Lefeber (pilot)	
1 km time trial	C1	Ricardo Ten Argilés; Spain	1:15.182	Mohamad Shaharuddin; Malaysia	1:15.432	Ivan Ermakov; Individual Neutral Athletes	1:17.657
1 km time trial	C2	Alexandre Léauté; France	1:09.003	Hidde Buur; Netherlands	1:10.348	Gordon Allan; Australia	1:10.905
1 km time trial	C3	Korey Boddington; Australia	1:02.848; WR	Devon Briggs; New Zealand	1:06.274	Fin Graham; Great Britain	1:08.376
1 km time trial	C4	Jody Cundy; Great Britain	1:03.872	Archie Atkinson; Great Britain	1:05.588	Jarno Thierens; Belgium	1:05.624
1 km time trial	C5	Alfonso Cabello; Spain	1:03.513	Blaine Hunt; Great Britain	1:04.045	Franz-Josef Lässer; Austria	1:07.125
1 km time trial	B	Great Britain; James Ball; Steffan Lloyd (pilot)	1:00.773	Australia; Kane Perris; Luke Zaccaria (pilot)	1:01.998	Italy; Stefano Meroni; Francesco Ceci (pilot)	1:02.557
Individual pursuit	B	Great Britain; Stephen Bate; Christopher Latham (pilot)	caught opponent^{G}	Italy; Lorenzo Bernard; Paolo Totò (pilot)	OVL^{G}	United States; Branden Walton; Ian Anderson (pilot)	4:14.000^{B}
Scratch race	C1	Ricardo Ten Argilés; Spain		Ivan Ermakov; Individual Neutral Athletes		Lennert Vanlathem; Belgium	
Scratch race	C2	Alexandre Léauté; France		Hidde Buur; Netherlands		Matthew Robertson; Great Britain	
Scratch race	C3	Devon Briggs; New Zealand		Fin Graham; Great Britain		Eduardo Santas; Spain	
Scratch race	C4	Archie Atkinson; Great Britain		Gatien Le Rousseau; France		Diego Germán Dueñas; Colombia	
Scratch race	C5	Daniel Abraham; Netherlands		Martin van de Pol; Netherlands		Carlos Vargas; Colombia	
Elimination	C1	Ricardo Ten Argilés; Spain		Ivan Ermakov; Individual Neutral Athletes		Lennert Vanlathem; Belgium	
Elimination	C2	Alexandre Léauté; France		Hidde Buur; Netherlands		Shota Kawamoto; Japan	
Elimination	C3	Korey Boddington; Australia		Fin Graham; Great Britain		Eduardo Santas; Spain	
Elimination	C4	Gatien Le Rousseau; France		Archie Atkinson; Great Britain		Diego Germán Dueñas; Colombia	
Elimination	C5	Franz-Josef Lässer; Austria		Lauro Chaman; Brazil		Mathis Tiphaigne; France	

=== Women ===
Event	Class	Gold		Silver		Bronze	
Sprint	C1	Tahlia Clayton-Goodie; Australia		Victoria Barbosa; Brazil		—N/a	
Sprint	C2	Flurina Rigling; Switzerland		Sabrina Custódia; Brazil		Maike Hausberger; Germany	
Sprint	C3	Mel Pemble; Canada		Aniek van den Aarssen; Netherlands		Emily Petricola; Australia	
Sprint	C4	Erin Normoyle; Australia		Kadeena Cox; Great Britain		Siobhan Terry; New Zealand	
Sprint	C5	Claudia Cretti; Italy		Nicole Murray; New Zealand		Mariela Delgado; Argentina	
Sprint	B	Great Britain; Elizabeth Jordan; Dannielle Khan (pilot)		Australia; Jessica Gallagher; Jacqui Mengler-Mohr (pilot)		Great Britain; Sophie Unwin; Jenny Holl (pilot)	
1 km time trial	C1	Tahlia Clayton-Goodie; Australia	1:25.366; WR	Victoria Barbosa; Brazil	1:48.194	—N/a	
1 km time trial	C2	Sabrina Custódia; Brazil	1:20.020; WR	Flurina Rigling; Switzerland	1:20.299	Maike Hausberger; Germany	1:21.476
1 km time trial	C3	Emily Petricola; Australia	1:14.630; WR	Mel Pemble; Canada	1:16.798	Aniek van den Aarssen; Netherlands	1:19.540
1 km time trial	C4	Tara Neyland; Australia	1:10.806; WR	Kadeena Cox; Great Britain	1:13.962	Siobhan Terry; New Zealand	1:15.283
1 km time trial	C5	Claudia Cretti; Italy	1:12.028; WR	Nicole Murray; New Zealand	1:13.619	Mariela Delgado; Argentina	1:14.629
1 km time trial	B	Great Britain; Elizabeth Jordan; Dannielle Khan (pilot)	1:06.796	New Zealand; Emma Foy; Jessie Hodges (pilot)	1:07.228	Australia; Jessica Gallagher; Jacqui Mengler-Mohr (pilot)	1:07.280
Individual pursuit	B	Great Britain; Sophie Unwin; Jenny Holl (pilot)	4:32.926^{G}	New Zealand; Emma Foy; Jessie Hodges (pilot)	4:34.949^{G}	Great Britain; Elizabeth Jordan; Dannielle Khan (pilot)	caught opponent^{B}
Scratch race	C1	Tahlia Clayton-Goodie; Australia		Victoria Barbosa; Brazil		—N/a	
Scratch race	C2	Flurina Rigling; Switzerland		Maike Hausberger; Germany		Sabrina Custódia; Brazil	
Scratch race	C3	Emily Petricola; Australia		Paula Caballeros; Colombia		Mel Pemble; Canada	
Scratch race	C4	Tara Neyland; Australia		Siobhan Terry; New Zealand		Shawn Morelli; United States	
Scratch race	C5	Claudia Cretti; Italy		Anna Harkowska; Poland		Nicole Murray; New Zealand	
Elimination	C1	Tahlia Clayton-Goodie; Australia		Victoria Barbosa; Brazil		—N/a	
Elimination	C2	Flurina Rigling; Switzerland		Sabrina Custódia; Brazil		Maike Hausberger; Germany	
Elimination	C3	Emily Petricola; Australia		Mel Pemble; Canada		Aniek van den Aarssen; Netherlands	
Elimination	C4	Tara Neyland; Australia		Siobhan Terry; New Zealand		Erin Normoyle; Australia	
Elimination	C5	Claudia Cretti; Italy		Nicole Murray; New Zealand		Anna Harkowska; Poland	

=== Mixed ===
Event	Class	Gold		Silver		Bronze	
Team sprint	B	Australia; Jessica Gallagher; Jacqui Mengler-Mohr (pilot); Kane Perris; Luke Zaccaria (pilot)	49.288^{G} WR	Italy; Marianna Agostini; Elena Bissolati (pilot); Stefano Meroni; Francesco Ceci (pilot)	49.975^{G}	Great Britain; Elizabeth Jordan; Dannielle Khan (pilot); James Ball; Steffan Lloyd (pilot)	50.406^{B}
Team sprint	C1–5	Australia; Erin Normoyle; Michael Shippley; Korey Boddington	49.837^{G}	Great Britain; Kadeena Cox; Fin Graham; Jody Cundy	49.288^{G}	Spain; Isabel Yingüa Hernández; Eduardo Santas; Pablo Jaramillo Gallardo	51.427^{B}

== Medal table ==
* Host nation (Brazil)

Rank	Nation	Gold	Silver	Bronze	Total
1	Australia	16	4	5	25
2	Great Britain	9	8	6	23
3	Italy	4	2	1	7
4	Spain	4	1	4	9
5	France	4	1	2	7
6	Switzerland	3	1	0	4
7	Netherlands	2	5	2	9
8	New Zealand	1	9	3	13
9	Brazil*	1	7	1	9
10	Canada	1	2	1	4
11	Belgium	1	1	4	6
12	Austria	1	1	1	3
13	Malaysia	1	1	0	2
14	Individual Neutral Athletes	0	2	2	4
15	Colombia	0	1	3	4
15	Germany	0	1	3	4
17	Poland	0	1	1	2
18	Argentina	0	0	2	2
18	United States	0	0	2	2
20	Japan	0	0	1	1
Totals (20 entries)		48	48	44	140
