= 2020 UCI Para-cycling Track World Championships =

Para-cycling world championship

- Venue: Milton, Canada
- Date: 30 January–2 February
- Velodrome: Mattamy National Cycling Centre
- Nations participating: 31
- Cyclists participating: 159+40

The 2020 UCI Para-cycling Track World Championships were held from 30 January to 2 February 2020 at the Mattamy National Cycling Centre in Milton, Canada.

== Results ==
=== Men ===
| Event | Class | Gold | | Silver | | Bronze | |
|---|---|---|---|---|---|---|---|
| Sprint | B | Great Britain; James Ball; Lewis Stewart (pilot) | | Great Britain; Neil Fachie; Matthew Rotherham (pilot) | | Poland; Adam Brzozowski; Kamil Kuczynski (pilot) | |
| 1 km time trial | C1 | Li Zhangyu; China | 1:11.166 WR | Liang Weicong; China | 1:12.944 | Ricardo Ten Argiles; Spain | 1:15.322 |
| 1 km time trial | C2 | Alexandre Léauté; France | 1:11.373 WR | Tristen Chernove; Canada | 1:12.231 | Gordon Allan; Australia | 1:12.789 |
| 1 km time trial | C3 | Jaco van Gass; Great Britain | 1:07.867 | Aleksei Obydennov; Russia | 1:08.747 | Eduardo Santas Asensio; Spain | 1:09.459 |
| 1 km time trial | C4 | Jody Cundy; Great Britain | 1:05.087 | Jozef Metelka; Slovakia | 1:06.039 | Carol-Eduard Novak; Romania | 1:08.310 |
| 1 km time trial | C5 | Alfonso Cabello Llamas; Spain | 1:03.180 | Christopher Murphy; United States | 1:05.259 | Dorian Foulon; France | 1:05.682 |
| 1 km time trial | B | Great Britain; Neil Fachie; Matthew Rotherham (pilot) | 59.724 | Great Britain; James Ball; Lewis Stewart (pilot) | 1:00.323 | Germany; Kai-Kristian Kruse; Robert Förstemann (pilot) | 1:01.678 |
| Individual pursuit | C1 | Li Zhangyu; China | 3:48.206 | Ricardo Ten Argiles; Spain | 3:49.657 | Liang Weicong; China | 3:48.231 |
| Individual pursuit | C2 | Ewoud Vromant; Belgium | 3:36.322 | Alexandre Léauté; France | 3:42.970 | Liang Guihua; China | 3:38.925 |
| Individual pursuit | C3 | David Nicholas; Australia | 3:28.764 | Jaco van Gass; Great Britain | 3:29.266 | Eduardo Santas Asensio; Spain | 3:28.855 |
| Individual pursuit | C4 | Jozef Metelka; Slovakia | | Carol-Eduard Novak; Romania | OVL | Ronan Grimes; Ireland | 4:43.806 |
| Individual pursuit | C5 | Dorian Foulon; France | 4:30.245 | Lauro Cesar Mouro Chaman; Brazil | 4:30.573 | Jonathan Gildea; Great Britain | 4:31.519 |
| Individual pursuit | B | Poland; Marcin Polak; Michal Ladosz (pilot) | | Great Britain; Stephen Bate; Adam Duggleby (pilot) | OVL | Netherlands; Vincent Ter Schure; Timo Fransen (pilot) | 4:11.905 |
| Scratch race | C1 | Ricardo Ten Argiles; Spain | | Ivan Ermakov; Russia | | Mohamad Yusof Hafizi Shaharuddin; Malaysia | |
| Scratch race | C2 | Maurice Far Eckhard Tio; Spain | | Tristen Chernove; Canada | | Alexandre Léauté; France | |
| Scratch race | C3 | Jaco van Gass; Great Britain | | Aleksei Obydennov; Russia | | Eduardo Santas Asensio; Spain | |
| Scratch race | C4 | Jozef Metelka; Slovakia | | Jason Macom; United States | | Sergei Pudov; Russia | |
| Scratch race | C5 | Alistair Donohoe; Australia | | Daniel Abraham Gebru; Netherlands | | Lauro Cesar Mouro Chaman; Brazil | |
| Omnium | C1 | Ricardo Ten Argiles; Spain | 158 pts. | Liang Weicong; China | 148 pts. | Aaron Keith; United States | 134 pts. |
| Omnium | C2 | Alexandre Léauté; France | 154 pts. | Tristen Chernove; Canada | 146 pts. | Liang Guihua; China | 136 pts. |
| Omnium | C3 | Jaco van Gass; Great Britain | 156 pts. | Aleksei Obydennov; Russia | 144 pts. | Eduardo Santas Asensio; Spain | 144 pts. |
| Omnium | C4 | Jozef Metelka; Slovakia | 158 pts. | Jason Macom; United States | 140 pts. | Carol-Eduard Novak; Romania | 138 pts. |
| Omnium | C5 | Dorian Foulon; France | 148 pts. | Lauro Cesar Mouro Chaman; Brazil | 138 pts. | Yehor Dementyev; Ukraine | 130 pts. |

=== Women ===
| Event | Class | Gold | | Silver | | Bronze | |
|---|---|---|---|---|---|---|---|
| Sprint | B | Great Britain; Sophie Thornhill; Helen Scott (pilot) | | Belgium; Griet Hoet; Anneleen Monsieur (pilot) | | United States; Stephanie Zundel; Heather Gray (pilot) | |
| 500 m time trial | C1 | Qian Wangwei; China | 55.684 | Not awarded | | | |
| 500 m time trial | C2 | Amanda Reid; Australia | 39.035 WR | Alyda Norbruis; Netherlands | 40.234 | Song Zhenling; China | 42.581 |
| 500 m time trial | C3 | Clara Brown; United States | 40.940 | Wang Xiaomei; China | 41.722 | Keiko Sugiura; Japan | 42.844 |
| 500 m time trial | C4 | Kate O'Brien; Canada | 35.223 WR | Kadeena Cox; Great Britain | 36.653 | Ruan Jianping; China | 38.536 |
| 500 m time trial | C5 | Caroline Groot; Netherlands | 36.159 | Marie Patouillet; France | 37.547 | Sarah Storey; Great Britain | 38.210 |
| 500 m time trial | B | Great Britain; Sophie Thornhill; Helen Scott (pilot) | 1:04.953 | Netherlands; Larissa Klaassen; Imke Brommer (pilot) | 1:06.984 | New Zealand; Emma Foy; Hannah Vankampen (pilot) | 1:07.352 |
| Individual pursuit | C1 | Qian Wangwei; China | 4:57.300 | Not awarded | | | |
| Individual pursuit | C2 | Zeng Sini; China | 4:09.740 | Sarah Ellington; New Zealand | 4:17.929 | Maike Hausberger; Germany | OVL |
| Individual pursuit | C3 | Paige Greco; Australia | 4:00.243 | Clara Brown; United States | 4:04.909 | Denise Schindler; Germany | 4:04.119 |
| Individual pursuit | C4 | Emily Petricola; Australia | 3:44.146 | Meg Lemon; Australia | OVL | Shawn Morelli; United States | 3:55.826 |
| Individual pursuit | C5 | Sarah Storey; Great Britain | | Crystal Lane-Wright; Great Britain | OVL | Nicole Murray; New Zealand | |
| Individual pursuit | B | New Zealand; Emma Foy; Hannah van Kampen (pilot) | 3:23.163 | Ireland; Katie-George Dunlevy; Eve McCrystal (pilot) | 3:31.396 | Belgium; Griet Hoet; Anneleen Monsieur (pilot) | OVL |
| Scratch race | C1 | Qian Wangwei; China | | Not awarded | | | |
| Scratch race | C2 | Amanda Reid; Australia | | Maike Hausberger; Germany | | Song Zhenling; China | |
| Scratch race | C3 | Wang Xiaomei; China | | Clara Brown; United States | | Richael Timothy; Ireland | |
| Scratch race | C4 | Emily Petricola; Australia | | Ruan Jianping; China | | Samantha Bosco; United States | |
| Scratch race | C5 | Sarah Storey; Great Britain | | Crystal Lane-Wright; Great Britain | | Caroline Groot; Netherlands | |
| Omnium | C1 | Qian Wangwei; China | 120 pts. | Not awarded | | | |
| Omnium | C2 | Song Zhenling; China | 152 pts. | Maike Hausberger; Germany | 150 pts. | Zeng Sini; China | 150 pts. |
| Omnium | C3 | Clara Brown; United States | 154 pts. | Wang Xiaomei; China | 150 pts. | Denise Schindler; Germany | 140 pts. |
| Omnium | C4 | Emily Petricola; Australia | 154 pts. | Samantha Bosco; United States | 138 pts. | Ruan Jianping; China | 136 pts. |
| Omnium | C5 | Sarah Storey; Great Britain | 156 pts. | Marie Patouillet; France | 146 pts. | Caroline Groot; Netherlands | 144 pts. |

=== Mixed ===
| Event | Class | Gold | | Silver | | Bronze | |
|---|---|---|---|---|---|---|---|
| Team sprint | B | Netherlands; Larissa Klaassen; Imke Brommer (pilot); Vincent Ter Schure; Timo Fransen (pilot) | 49.696 | Poland; Angelika Biedrzycka; Edyta Jasinska (pilot); Adam Brzozowski; Kamil Kuczynski (pilot) | 51.636 | Greece; Eleni Kalatzi; Argyro Mlaki (pilot); Christos Sandalakis; Sotirios Bretas (pilot) | 52.015 |
| Team sprint | C1–5 | China; Li Zhangyu; Wu Guoqing; Lai Shanzhang | 48.096 | Great Britain; Louis Rolfe; Jody Cundy; Jon-Allan Butterworth | 48.803 | United States; Joseph Berenyi; Jason Kimball; Christopher Murphy | 50.242 |

== Medal table ==
* Host nation (Canada)

| Rank | Nation | Gold | Silver | Bronze | Total |
|---|---|---|---|---|---|
| 1 | Great Britain (GBR) | 11 | 8 | 2 | 21 |
| 2 | China (CHN) | 10 | 5 | 8 | 23 |
| 3 | Australia (AUS) | 8 | 1 | 1 | 10 |
| 4 | France (FRA) | 4 | 3 | 2 | 9 |
| 5 | Spain (ESP) | 4 | 1 | 5 | 10 |
| 6 | Slovakia (SVK) | 3 | 1 | 0 | 4 |
| 7 | United States (USA) | 2 | 6 | 5 | 13 |
| 8 | Netherlands (NED) | 2 | 3 | 3 | 8 |
| 9 | Canada (CAN)* | 1 | 3 | 0 | 4 |
| 10 | New Zealand (NZL) | 1 | 1 | 2 | 4 |
| 11 | Belgium (BEL) | 1 | 1 | 1 | 3 |
| 11 | Poland (POL) | 1 | 1 | 1 | 3 |
| – | Authorised Neutral Athletes (ANA) | 0 | 4 | 1 | 5 |
| 13 | Germany (GER) | 0 | 2 | 4 | 6 |
| 14 | Brazil (BRA) | 0 | 2 | 1 | 3 |
| 15 | Ireland (IRL) | 0 | 1 | 2 | 3 |
| 15 | Romania (ROU) | 0 | 1 | 2 | 3 |
| 17 | Greece (GRE) | 0 | 0 | 1 | 1 |
| 17 | Japan (JPN) | 0 | 0 | 1 | 1 |
| 17 | Malaysia (MAS) | 0 | 0 | 1 | 1 |
| 17 | Ukraine (UKR) | 0 | 0 | 1 | 1 |
| Totals (20 entries) | | 48 | 44 | 44 | 136 |
