= 2022 UCI Para-cycling Track World Championships =

- Venue: Saint-Quentin-en-Yvelines, France
- Date: 20–23 October
- Velodrome: Vélodrome National
- Nations participating: 38
- Cyclists participating: 174+37
- Events: 48

The 2022 UCI Para-cycling Track World Championships were held from 20 to 23 October 2022, at the Vélodrome National in Saint-Quentin-en-Yvelines, France.

== Results ==
=== Men ===
Event	Class	Gold		Silver		Bronze	
Sprint	B	Great Britain; Neil Fachie; Matt Rotherham (pilot)		Germany; Thomas Ulbricht; Robert Förstemann (pilot)		Great Britain; James Ball; Steffan Lloyd (pilot)	
1 km time trial	C1	Sam Ruddock; Great Britain	1:13.089	Ricardo Ten; Spain	1:14.622	Mohamad Yusof Hafizi Shaharuddin; Malaysia	1:14.860
1 km time trial	C2	Alexandre Léauté; France	1:08.503	Shota Kawamoto; Japan	1:10.843	Gordon Allan; Australia	1:11.195
1 km time trial	C3	Jaco van Gass; Great Britain	1:06.122	Finlay Graham; Great Britain	1:07.460	Stijn Boersma; Netherlands	1:08.846
1 km time trial	C4	Jody Cundy; Great Britain	1:04.493	Devon Briggs; New Zealand	1:07.116	Jozef Metelka; Slovakia	1:07.123
1 km time trial	C5	Blaine Hunt; Great Britain	1:04.292	Christopher Murphy; United States	1:04.579	Dorian Foulon; France	1:05.307
1 km time trial	B	Great Britain; Neil Fachie; Matt Rotherham (pilot)	59.921	Great Britain; James Ball; Steffan Lloyd (pilot)	1:00.184	Germany; Thomas Ulbricht; Robert Förstemann (pilot)	1:01.474
Individual pursuit	C1	Ricardo Ten; Spain	3:47.625	Aaron Keith; United States	3:47.885	Pierre Senska; Germany	
Individual pursuit	C2	Alexandre Leaute; France	3:31.394	Shota Kawamoto; Japan	OVR	Ryan Taylor; Great Britain	3:37.432
Individual pursuit	C3	Finlay Graham; Great Britain	3:24.596	Matthijs Drenth; Netherlands	3:30.797	David Nicholas; Australia	3:30.473
Individual pursuit	C4	Jozef Metelka; Slovakia	4:39.476	Ronan Grimes; Ireland	4:45.129	Diego Germán Dueñas; Colombia	4:43.965
Individual pursuit	C5	Dorian Foulon; France	4:24.072	Yegor Dementyev; Ukraine	OVL	Daniel Abraham; Netherlands	4:27.219
Individual pursuit	B	Great Britain; Stephen Bate; Christopher Latham (pilot)		Netherlands; Tristan Bangma; Patrick Bos (pilot)	DNF	Netherlands; Vincent ter Schure; Timo Fransen (pilot)	4:07.769
Scratch race	C1	Ricardo Ten; Spain		Aaron Keith; United States		Pierre Senska; Germany	
Scratch race	C2	Alexandre Leaute; France		Darren Hicks; Australia		Maurice Eckhard; Spain	
Scratch race	C3	Finlay Graham; Great Britain		Eduardo Santas; Spain		Matthijs Drenth; Netherlands	
Scratch race	C4	Jozef Metelka; Slovakia		Fabian Döring; Germany		John Terrell; United States	
Scratch race	C5	Alistair Donohoe; Australia		Dorian Foulon; France		Daniel Abraham; Netherlands	
Omnium	C1	Ricardo Ten; Spain	160 pts	Aaron Keith; United States	148 pts	Pierre Senska; Germany	140 pts
Omnium	C2	Alexandre Léauté; France	160 pts	Shota Kawamoto; Japan	142 pts	Ewoud Vromant; Belgium	130 pts
Omnium	C3	Finlay Graham; Great Britain	160 pts	Stijn Boersma; Netherlands	144 pts	Eduardo Santas; Spain	142 pts
Omnium	C4	Jozef Metelka; Slovakia	148 pts	Devon Briggs; New Zealand	140 pts	John Terrell; United States	130 pts
Omnium	C5	Dorian Foulon; France	152 pts	Alistair Donohoe; Australia	132 pts	Lauro Chaman; Brazil	128 pts

=== Women ===
Event	Class	Gold		Silver		Bronze	
Sprint	B	Belgium; Griet Hoet; Anneleen Monsieur (pilot)		Australia; Jessica Gallagher; Caitlin Ward (pilot)		Great Britain; Sophie Unwin; Jenny Holl (pilot)	
500 m time trial	C1	Katie Toft; Great Britain	47.212	Not awarded			
500 m time trial	C2	Amanda Reid; Australia	38.602	Sabrina Custódia; Brazil	43.228	Flurina Rigling; Switzerland	43.808
500 m time trial	C3	Aniek van den Aarssen; Netherlands	39.093	Keiko Sugiura; Japan	39.557	Paige Greco; Australia	39.662
500 m time trial	C4	Kadeena Cox; Great Britain	35.660	Kate O'Brien; Canada	37.344	Anna Taylor; New Zealand	38.907
500 m time trial	C5	Caroline Groot; Netherlands	36.841	Marie Patouillet; France	37.191	Erin Rowell; Australia	37.564
1 km time trial	B	Belgium; Griet Hoet; Anneleen Monsieur (pilot)	1:07.410	Australia; Jessica Gallagher; Caitlin Ward (pilot)	1:07.903	Great Britain; Sophie Unwin; Jenny Holl (pilot)	1:07.991
Individual pursuit	C1	Katie Toft; Great Britain	4:42.609	Not awarded			
Individual pursuit	C2	Flurina Rigling; Switzerland	4:00.228	Amanda Reid; Australia	4:08.130	Carolina Munévar; Colombia	4:16.735
Individual pursuit	C3	Daphne Schrager; Great Britain	3:58.963	Keiko Sugiura; Japan	4:00.661	Clara Brown; United States	4:03.362
Individual pursuit	C4	Emily Petricola; Australia	3:42.449	Samantha Bosco; United States	3:49.217	Meg Lemon; Australia	3:52.700
Individual pursuit	C5	Sarah Storey; Great Britain		Heïdi Gaugain; France	OVL	Nicole Murray; New Zealand	3:43.282
Individual pursuit	B	Great Britain; Sophie Unwin; Jenny Holl (pilot)	3:26.124	Great Britain; Elizabeth Jordan; Corrine Hall (pilot)	3:29.117	France; Anne Sophie Centis; Élise Delzenne (pilot)	3:32.439
Scratch race	C1	Katie Toft; Great Britain		Not awarded			
Scratch race	C2	Amanda Reid; Australia		Flurina Rigling; Switzerland		Christelle Ribault; France	
Scratch race	C3	Mel Pemble; Canada		Aniek van den Aarssen; Netherlands		Clara Brown; United States	
Scratch race	C4	Emily Petricola; Australia		Samantha Bosco; United States		Meg Lemon; Australia	
Scratch race	C5	Nicole Murray; New Zealand		Crystal Lane-Wright; Great Britain		Marie Patouillet; France	
Omnium	C1	Katie Toft; Great Britain		Not awarded			
Omnium	C2	Amanda Reid; Australia	158 pts	Flurina Rigling; Switzerland	152 pts	Carolina Munévar; Colombia	134 pts
Omnium	C3	Mel Pemble; Canada	150 pts	Aniek van den Aarssen; Netherlands	148 pts	Clara Brown; United States	144 pts
Omnium	C4	Emily Petricola; Australia	158 pts	Samantha Bosco; United States	150 pts	Anna Taylor; New Zealand	140 pts
Omnium	C5	Nicole Murray; New Zealand	148 pts	Marie Patouillet; France	148 pts	Heïdi Gaugain; France	130 pts

=== Mixed ===
Event	Class	Gold		Silver		Bronze	
Team sprint	B	Great Britain; Libby Clegg; Georgia Holt (pilot); James Ball; Steffan Lloyd (pilot)	48.901	Malaysia; Nur Suraiya Muhamad Zamri; Farina Shawati Mohd Adnan (pilot); Mohd Khairul Hazwan Wahab; Muhammad Khairul Adha Rasol (pilot)	52.429	France; Anne Sophie Centis; Élise Delzenne (pilot); Alexandre Lloveras; Maxime Gressier (pilot)	53.501
Team sprint	C1–5	Great Britain; Kadeena Cox; Jaco van Gass; Jody Cundy	48.675	France; Alexandre Léauté; Kévin Le Cunff; Dorian Foulon	49.300	Australia; Gordon Allan; Alistair Donohoe; Michael Shippley	50.240

== Medal table ==
* Host nation (France)

Rank	Nation	Gold	Silver	Bronze	Total
1	Great Britain	20	4	4	28
2	Australia	7	5	7	19
3	France*	6	5	6	17
4	Spain	3	2	2	7
5	Slovakia	3	0	1	4
6	Netherlands	2	5	5	12
7	New Zealand	2	2	3	7
8	Canada	2	1	0	3
9	Belgium	2	0	1	3
10	Switzerland	1	2	1	4
11	United States	0	7	5	12
12	Japan	0	5	0	5
13	Germany	0	2	4	6
14	Brazil	0	1	1	2
14	Malaysia	0	1	1	2
16	Ireland	0	1	0	1
16	Ukraine	0	1	0	1
18	Colombia	0	0	3	3
Totals (18 entries)		48	44	44	136
