= 2018 UCI Para-cycling Track World Championships =

Sporting event

- Venue: Rio de Janeiro,
- Date: 22–25 March 2018
- Velodrome: Rio Olympic Velodrome
- Nations participating: 28
- Cyclists participating: 155+37
- Events: 31

The 2018 UCI Para-cycling Track World Championships were the World Championships for track cycling with athletes with a physical disability. The Championships took place in Rio de Janeiro, Brazil from 22–25 March 2018.

31 events were held on the track.

== The championships ==
Brazil hosted the UCI Para-Cycling Track World Championships for the first time, at the Rio Olympic Velodrome located at the Barra Olympic and Paralympic Park. The Championship was also the first one to mark points for the ranking that will select the Tokyo Paralympic Games athletes. The velodrome's 250m Siberian pine track is banked to an angle of 12 degrees at its shallowest point and 42 degrees at its steepest point. The capacity is approximately 5,600.

== Track events ==
31 events were held in all; 15 for men and women, and a mixed team sprint.

Events were held in five discipline; match sprint, team sprint, time trial, individual pursuit and scratch race, and across 6 disability classifications.

Event	Class	Gold		Silver		Bronze	
Men's events
Sprint	Mixed team	Great Britain (GBR); Louis Rolfe; Jon-Allan Butterworth; Jody Cundy	49.915	China (CHN); Li Zhangyu; Wei Guoping; Lai Shanzhang	50.324	Spain (ESP); Amador Granados Alkorta; Eduardo Santas Asensio; Alfonso Cabello Llamas	51.181
Sprint	B	Neil Fachie; Matt Rotherham (GBR)		Tristan Bangma; Patrick Bos (NED)		James Ball; Peter Mitchell (GBR)	
Time trial Kilo	C1	Li Zhangyu (PRC)	1:12.586	Arnoud Nijhuis (NED)	1:13.106	Ricardo Ten Argiles (ESP)	1:17.276
Time trial Kilo	C2	Alejandro Perea Arango (COL)	1:13.396	Tristen Chernove (CAN)	1:14.105	Liang Guihua (CHN)	1:15.672
Time trial Kilo	C3	Joseph Berenyi (USA)	1:09.831	Diederick Schelfhout (BEL)	1:10.581	Kris Bosmans (BEL)	1:10.910
Time trial Kilo	C4	Jody Cundy (GBR)	1:04.579	Jozef Metelka (SVK)	1:07.336	Jacob Waters (USA)	1:08.739
Time trial Kilo	C5	Alfonso Cabello Llamas (ESP)	1:04.748	Jon-Allan Butterworth (GBR)	1:05.850	Blaine Hunt (GBR)	1:07.326
Time trial Kilo	B	Neil Fachie; Matt Rotherham (GBR)	59.686	James Ball; Peter Mitchell (GBR)	1:00.535	Tristan Bangma; Patrick Bos (NED)	1:00.755
Individual pursuit	C1	Ricardo Ten Argiles (ESP)	3:52.222	Ross Wilson (CAN)	3:54.584	Li Zhangyu (PRC)	OVL
Individual pursuit	C2	Tristen Chernove (CAN)	3:44.385	Liang Guihua (CHN)	3:50.304	Arslan Gilmutdinov (RUS)	3:49.618
Individual pursuit	C3	David Nicholas (AUS)	3:34.804	Diederick Schelfhout (BEL)	3:38.934	Joseph Berenyi (USA)	3:37.293
Individual pursuit	C4	Jozef Metelka (SVK)	4:30.584	Kyle Bridgwood (AUS)	4:36.546	Jaco van Gass (GBR)	4:43.461
Individual pursuit	C5	Yegor Dementyev (UKR)	4:31.619	Jonathan Gildea (GBR)	4:32.496	Daniel Abraham Gebru (NED)	4:34.285
Individual pursuit	B	Stephen Bate; Adam Duggleby (GBR)	4:12.579	Ignacio Avila Rodriguez; Joan Font Bertoli (ESP)	4:14.814	Tristan Bangma; Patrick Bos (NED)	4:14.957
Scratch race	C1-C3	Alejandro Perea Arango (COL) (C2)		Darren Hicks (AUS) (C2)		Tristen Chernove (CAN) (C2)	
Scratch race	C4-C5	Lauro Cesar Chaman (BRA) (C5)		Alistair Donohoe (AUS) (C5)		Daniel Abraham Gebru (NED) (C5)	
Women's events
Sprint	B	Sophie Thornhill; Helen Scott (GBR)		Jessica Gallagher; Madison Janssen (AUS)		Griet Hoet; Anneleen Monsieur (BEL)	
Time trial 500m	C1	Li Jieli (CHN)	43.430	Katie Toft (GBR)	47.153	Only gold awarded	
Time trial 500m	C2	Alyda Norbruis (NED)	39.886	Amanda Reid (AUS)	41.034	Song Zhenling (CHN)	43.432
Time trial 500m	C3	Megan Giglia (GBR)	42.091	Denise Schindler (GER)	42.453	Jamie Whitmore (USA)	43.506
Time trial 500m	C4	Ruan Jangping (CHN)	38.437	Katherine Horan (NZL)	39.932	Emily Petricola (AUS)	41.409
Time trial 500m	C5	Caroline Groot (NED)	36.575	Zhou Jufang (CHN)	38.324	Mariela Delgado (ARG)	38.689
Time trial 500m	B (kilo)	Sophie Thornhill; Helen Scott (GBR)	1:05.079	Jessica Gallagher; Madison Janssen (AUS)	1:07.708	Griet Hoet; Anneleen Monsieur (BEL)	1:08.314
Individual pursuit	C1	Katie Toft (GBR)	4:41.945	Li Jieli (CHN)	5:20.605	Only gold awarded	
Individual pursuit	C2	Alyda Norbruis (NED)	4:11.913	Zeng Sini (CHN)	4:13.340	Daniela Munévar (COL)	OVL
Individual pursuit	C3	Denise Schindler (GER)	4:06.604	Megan Giglia (GBR)	4:21.413	Jamie Whitmore (USA)	4:16.114
Individual pursuit	C4	Shawn Morelli (USA)	3:56.576	Emily Petricola (AUS)	3:57.781	Meg Lemon (AUS)	OVL
Individual pursuit	C5	Crystal Lane-Wright (GBR)	3:56.936	Nicole Murray (NZL)	3:51.455	Samantha Bosco (USA)	4:00.107
Individual pursuit	B	Lora Fachie; Corrine Hall (GBR)	3:31.685	Griet Hoet; Anneleen Monsieur (BEL)	3:35.016	Katie-George Dunlevy; Eve McCrystal (IRL)	3:42.433
Scratch race	C1-C3	Alyda Norbruis (NED) (C2)		Denise Schindler (GER) (C3)		Jamie Whitmore (USA) (C3)	
Scratch race	C4-C5	Caroline Groot (NED) (C5)		Paula Ossa Veloza (COL) (C5)		Mariela Delgado (ARG) (C5)	
