= 2019 UCI Para-cycling Track World Championships =

- Venue: Apeldoorn, Netherlands
- Date: 14–17 March
- Velodrome: Omnisport Apeldoorn
- Nations participating: 36
- Cyclists participating: 192+43
- Events: 37

The 2019 UCI Para-cycling Track World Championships were the World Championships for track cycling with athletes with a physical disability. The Championships took place in Apeldoorn, Netherlands from 14 to 17 March 2019.

== The championships ==
Apeldoorn in the Netherlands hosted the UCI Para-Cycling Track World Championships for the second time.

== Track events ==
Events were held in five discipline; match sprint, team sprint, time trial, individual pursuit and scratch race, and across 6 disability classifications. Test events were held for: 1 km Tandem Mixed Team Sprint and Omnium (C1, C2, C3, C4 and C5 for Men and Women). Tests events do not count for the UCI Ranking and are not awarded a World Champion's title.

Event	Class	Gold		Silver		Bronze	
Men's events
Sprint	Mixed team	China (CHN); Li Zhangyu; Wu Guoqing; Lai Shanzhang	49.133	Great Britain (GBR); Louis Rolfe; Jon-Allan Butterworth; Jody Cundy	49.378	United States (USA); Jason Kimball; Joseph Berenyi; Christophe Murphy	50.058
Sprint	B	Neil Fachie; Matt Rotherham (GBR)		James Ball; Peter Mitchell (GBR)		Adam Brzozowski; Kamil Kuczyński (POL)	
Time trial Kilo	C1	Li Zhangyu (PRC)	1:11.817	Liang Weicong (PRC)	1:13.865	Ricardo Ten Argiles (ESP)	1:16.266
Time trial Kilo	C2	Alejandro Perea (COL)	1:12.838	Gordon Allan (AUS)	1:12.873	Tristen Chernove (CAN)	1:13.534
Time trial Kilo	C3	Joseph Berenyi (USA)	1:08.381	Eduardo Santas (ESP)	1:09.553	Diederick Schelfhout (BEL)	1:09.698
Time trial Kilo	C4	Jody Cundy (GBR)	1:05.422	Jozef Metelka (SVK)	1:06.477	Justin Widhalm (USA)	1:07.822
Time trial Kilo	C5	Alfonso Cabello (ESP)	1:04.414	Blaine Hunt (GBR)	1:06.406	Christophe Murphy (USA)	1:06.495
Time trial Kilo	B	James Ball; Peter Mitchell (GBR)	1:00.060	Neil Fachie; Matt Rotherham (GBR)	1:00.190	Tristan Bangma; Patrick Bos (NED)	1:00.960
Individual pursuit	C1	Ricardo Ten Argiles (ESP)		Li Zhangyu (PRC)	OVL	Ross Wilson (CAN)	3:55.268
Individual pursuit	C2	Darren Hicks (AUS)	3:45.390	Tristen Chernove (CAN)	3:48.895	Alejandro Perea (COL)	3:39.101
Individual pursuit	C3	David Nicholas (AUS)	3:29.879	Eduardo Santas (ESP)	3:37.245	Diederick Schelfhout (BEL)	3:35.190
Individual pursuit	C4	Jozef Metelka (SVK)		George Peasgood (GBR)	OVL	Diego Dueñas (COL)	4:50.475
Individual pursuit	C5	Alistair Donohoe (AUS)		Yehor Dementyev (UKR)	OVL	Daniel Abraham Gebru (NED)	04:36.875
Individual pursuit	B	Marcin Polak; Michał Ładosz (POL)	4:12.490	Vincent ter Schure; Timo Fransen (NED)	4:13.690	Tristan Bangma; Patrick Bos (NED)	4:11.200
Scratch race	C1	Ricardo Ten Argilés (ESP)		Ivan Ermakov (RUS)		Darcy Thompson (AUS)	
Scratch race	C2	Tristen Chernove (CAN)		Alejandro Perea (COL)		Liang Guihua (CHN)	
Scratch race	C3	David Nicholas (AUS)		Joseph Berenyi (USA)		Alexsey Obydennov (RUS)	
Scratch race	C4	Diego Dueñas (COL)		Ronan Grimes (IRL)		Sergei Pudov (RUS)	
Scratch race	C5	Alistair Donohoe (AUS)		William Bjergfelt (GBR)		Daniel Abraham Gebru (NED)	
Women's events
Sprint	B	Sophie Thornhill; Helen Scott (GBR)		Jessica Gallagher; Madison Janssen (AUS)		Larissa Klaassen; Imke Brommer (NED)	
Time trial 500m	C1	Li Jieli (CHN)	43.830	Katie Toft (GBR)	47.099	Not awarded	
Time trial 500m	C2	Amanda Reid (AUS)	39.505	Alyda Norbruis (NED)	40.191	Song Zhenling (CHN)	42.697
Time trial 500m	C3	Paige Greco (AUS)	39.442	Keiko Sugiura (JPN)	41.254	Xiaomei Wang (USA)	41.345
Time trial 500m	C4	Kadeena Cox (GBR)	36.176	Ruan Jianping (CHN)	38.436	Katherine Horan (NZL)	39.846
Time trial 500m	C5	Caroline Groot (NED)	36.464	Sarah Storey (GBR)	38.111	Marie Patouillet (FRA)	38.739
Time trial 500m	B (kilo)	Sophie Thornhill; Helen Scott (GBR)	1:05.612	Larissa Klaassen; Imke Brommer (NED)	1:06.545	Emma Foy; Hannah van Kampen (NZL)	1:07.632
Individual pursuit	C1	Katie Toft (GBR)	4:43.767	Not awarded			
Individual pursuit	C2	Zeng Sini (CHN)	4:14.610	Daniela Munévar (COL)	4:15.454	Sarah Ellington (NZL)	4:30.259
Individual pursuit	C3	Paige Greco (AUS)	4:01.609	Denise Schindler (GER)	OVL	Anna Beck (SWE)	4:08.936
Individual pursuit	C4	Emily Petricola (AUS)		Keely Shaw (CAN)	OVL	Meg Lemon (AUS)	04:00.873
Individual pursuit	C5	Sarah Storey (GBR)		Anna Harkowska (POL)	OVL	Samantha Bosco (USA)	3:53.513
Individual pursuit	B	Emma Foy; Hannah van Kampen (NZL)	3:28.281	Griet Hoet; Anneleen Monsieur (BEL)	3:34.410	Lora Fachie; Corrine Hall (GBR)	3:30.875
Scratch race	C1	Katie Toft (GBR)		Not awarded			
Scratch race	C2	Zeng Sini (CHN)		Amanda Reid (AUS)		Leidi Ramírez (COL)	
Scratch race	C3	Wang Xiaomei (CHN)		Paige Greco (AUS)		Denise Schindler (GER)	
Scratch race	C4	Ruan Jianping (CHN)		Meg Lemon (AUS)		Emily Petricola (AUS)	
Scratch race	C5	Sarah Storey (GBR)		Crystal Lane-Wright (GBR)		Samantha Bosco (USA)	

=== Medals table ===
* Host nation (Netherlands)

Rank	Nation	Gold	Silver	Bronze	Total
1	Great Britain (GBR)	10	9	1	20
2	Australia (AUS)	9	5	3	17
3	China (CHN)	7	3	3	13
4	Spain (ESP)	3	2	1	6
5	Colombia (COL)	2	2	2	6
6	Netherlands (NED)*	1	3	5	9
7	Canada (CAN)	1	2	2	5
8	United States (USA)	1	1	5	7
9	Poland (POL)	1	1	1	3
10	Slovakia (SVK)	1	1	0	2
11	New Zealand (NZL)	1	0	3	4
12	Belgium (BEL)	0	1	2	3
12	Russia (RUS)	0	1	2	3
14	Germany (GER)	0	1	1	2
15	Ireland (IRL)	0	1	0	1
15	Japan (JPN)	0	1	0	1
15	Ukraine (UKR)	0	1	0	1
18	France (FRA)	0	0	2	2
19	Sweden (SWE)	0	0	1	1
Totals (19 entries)		37	35	34	106
