= Victoria Barbosa =

Brazilian para-cyclist (born 1994)

Personal information
- Full name: Victoria Maria de Camargo e Barbosa
- Nationality: Brazilian
- Born: 31 March 1994 (age 32)

Sport
- Sport: Para-cycling
- Disability class: C1
Medal record
Women's para-cycling
Representing Brazil
Road World Championships
Silver medal – second place	2025 Ronse	Time trial C1
Silver medal – second place	2025 Ronse	Road race C1
Track World Championships
Silver medal – second place	2025 Rio de Janeiro	Sprint C1
Silver medal – second place	2025 Rio de Janeiro	Scratch race C1
Silver medal – second place	2025 Rio de Janeiro	Time trial C1
Silver medal – second place	2025 Rio de Janeiro	Elimination C1
Bronze medal – third place	2026 Apeldoorn	Scratch race C1
Bronze medal – third place	2026 Apeldoorn	Elimination C1

Victoria Maria de Camargo e Barbosa (born 31 March 1994) is a Brazilian para-cyclist who specializes in road and track events.

== Career ==
At the 2023 Parapan American Games, Barbosa competed in the road and track events. In March 2024, she competed in the Track World Championships, where she finished in seventh place in the omnium C2 event. In September 2024, she competed in the Road World Championships.

In August 2025, Barbosa represented Brazil at the 2025 UCI Para-cycling Road World Championships and won a silver medal in the time trial C1 event, with a time of 24:42.97, finishing behind Tahlia Clayton-Goodie. She also competed in the road race C1 event, where she won the silver medal, also finishing behind Clayton-Goodie.
