= Michael Shippley =

Australian Paralympic cyclist

Personal information
- Nationality: Australian
- Born: 30 June 1992 (age 34)

Sport
- Country: Australia
- Sport: Cycling
- Disability class: C4
Medal record
Men's para-cycling
Representing Australia
Track World Championships
Gold medal – first place	2025 Rio de Janeiro	Mixed team sprint C1–5
Silver medal – second place	2023 Glasgow	1km time trial C4
Bronze medal – third place	2022 Saint-Quentin-en-Yvelines	Mixed team sprint C1-5
Bronze medal – third place	2024 Rio de Janeiro	Time trial C4
Bronze medal – third place	2024 Rio de Janeiro	Mixed team sprint C1-5
Bronze medal – third place	2025 Rio de Janeiro	Sprint C4

Michael Shippley (born 30 June 1992) is an Australian Paralympic track athlete and cyclist. He has won medals at 2022 and 2023 UCI Para-cycling Track World Championships.

== Personal ==
Shippley was born 30 June 1998. In 2014, he had a motorbike accident which resulted in a left common perennial nerve palsy (foot drop) and multi ligament damage to his left knee. Shippley completed an engineering degree at Griffith University in 2020 and then commenced an exercise physiology degree. In 2019, he was awarded Full Blue Sporting Award at Griffith University.

== Cycling ==
Prior to his motorbike accident, participated in triathlon and Olympic weightlifting. He is classified as C4 cyclist.

At the 2019 Para-cycling Track World Championships, he finished 13th in the Men's Time Trial C5 and 4th in the Team Sprint C1-5. He missed selection for the 2020 Summer Paralympics in Tokyo, Japan.

At the 2022 UCI Para-cycling Track World Championships in Saint-Quentin-en-Yvelines, France, he won the bronze medal in the Mixed Team Sprint C1-5 and finished 5th in the Men's Time Trial C5.

At the 2023 UCI Para-cycling Track World Championships in Glasgow, he won the silver medal in the Men's 1 km Time Trial C4.

At the 2024 UCI Para-cycling Track World Championships in Rio de Janeiro, Brazil, he won two bronze - the Men's Time Trial C4 and the Mixed Team Sprint C1-5.

At the 2025 UCI Para-cycling Track World Championships in Rio de Janeiro, Brazil, he won the gold medal in the Mixed Team Sprint C1-5 and bronze medal in the Men's Sprint C4.

In 2022, he is a member of the Balmoral Cycling Club and a Queensland Academy of Sport scholarship athlete.

== Athletics ==
At the 2025 World Para Athletics Championships in New Delhi, he was ranked 15th in 100m T44. He is coached by Paul Pearce.
