= Hidde Buur =

Dutch para-cyclist (born 2003)

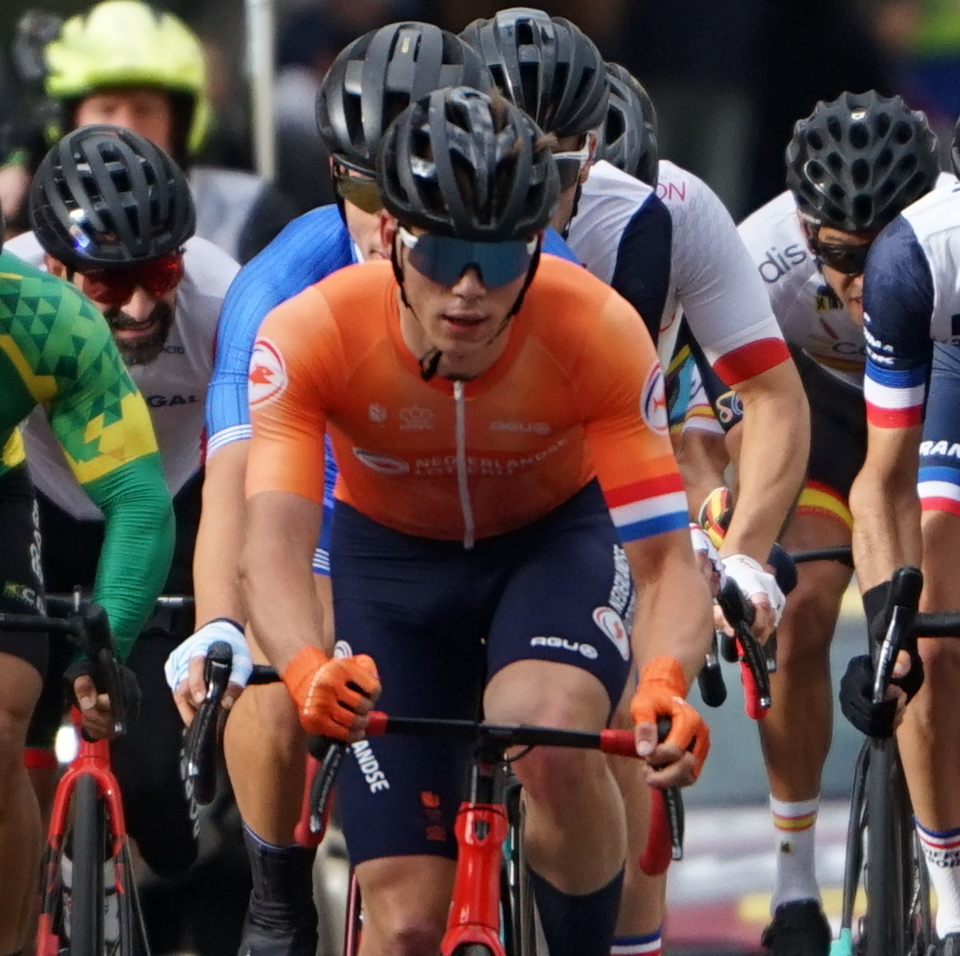
- Buur leading the group at the 2024 Road World Championships

Personal information
- Nationality: Dutch
- Born: 7 May 2003 (age 23)
- Height: 183 cm (6 ft 0 in)

Sport
- Sport: Para-cycling
- Disability class: C2
Medal record
Men's para-cycling
Representing the Netherlands
Track World Championships
Gold medal – first place	2025 Rio de Janeiro	Sprint C2
Gold medal – first place	2026 Apeldoorn	Sprint C2
Gold medal – first place	2026 Apeldoorn	1 km time trial C2
Silver medal – second place	2025 Rio de Janeiro	Scratch race C2
Silver medal – second place	2025 Rio de Janeiro	1 km time trial C2
Silver medal – second place	2025 Rio de Janeiro	Elimination C2
Road World Championships
Bronze medal – third place	2025 Ronse	Road race C2
European Championships
Silver medal – second place	2023 Rotterdam	Road race C3

Hidde Buur (born 7 May 2003) is a Dutch para-cyclist.

== Career ==
In August 2025, Buur represented the Netherlands at the 2025 UCI Para-cycling Road World Championships and won a bronze medal in the road race C2 event with a time of 1:37:30.
