= Stefano Meroni =

Italian para-cyclist (born 1982)

Personal information
- Nationality: Italian
- Born: 21 August 1982 (age 43)

Sport
- Sport: Para-cycling
- Disability: Vision impairment
- Disability class: B
Medal record
Men's para-cycling
Representing Italy
Track World Championships
Gold medal – first place	2024 Rio de Janeiro	Mixed team sprint B
Silver medal – second place	2023 Glasgow	Mixed team sprint B
Silver medal – second place	2025 Rio de Janeiro	Mixed team sprint B
Bronze medal – third place	2025 Rio de Janeiro	Tandem B kilo

Stefano Meroni (born 21 August 1982) is an Italian visually impaired para-cyclist.

== Career ==
Meroni made his UCI Para-cycling Track World Championships debut in 2023 and won a silver medal in the mixed team sprint B event, with a time of 51.264. He competed at the 2024 UCI Para-cycling Track World Championships and won a gold medal in the mixed team sprint B event with a time of 50.122. He competed at the 2025 UCI Para-cycling Track World Championships and won a silver medal in the mixed team sprint B event with a time of 49.975.
