= Maike Hausberger =

German Paralympic cyclist

Personal information
- Born: 9 January 1995 (age 31) Trier, Germany

Sport
- Country: Germany
- Sport: Paralympic cycling
- Disability: Hemiplegia
- Disability class: C2
Medal record
Representing Germany
Women's para-cycling
Paralympic Games
Gold medal – first place	2024 Paris	Road time trial C1–3
Bronze medal – third place	2024 Paris	500m time trial C1–3
Road World Championships
Gold medal – first place	2021 Cascais	Road race C2
Gold medal – first place	2022 Baie-Comeau	Time trial C2
Gold medal – first place	2022 Baie-Comeau	Road race C2
Silver medal – second place	2021 Cascais	Time trial C2
Silver medal – second place	2025 Ronse	Time trial C2
Bronze medal – third place	2025 Ronse	Road race C2
Track World Championships
Silver medal – second place	2020 Milton	Scratch race C2
Silver medal – second place	2020 Milton	Omnium C2
Silver medal – second place	2025 Rio de Janeiro	Scratch race C1-2
Bronze medal – third place	2020 Milton	Individual pursuit C2
Bronze medal – third place	2023 Glasgow	500 m time trial C2
Bronze medal – third place	2025 Rio de Janeiro	1 km time trial C2
Bronze medal – third place	2025 Rio de Janeiro	Sprint C2
Bronze medal – third place	2025 Rio de Janeiro	Elimination C2
European Championships
Silver medal – second place	2023 Rotterdam	Time trial C2
Women's para-athletics
European Championships
Silver medal – second place	2012 Stadskanaal	4x100m relay T35-38
Silver medal – second place	2012 Stadskanaal	Long jump T37
Bronze medal – third place	2014 Swansea	4x100m relay T35-38
Women's paratriathlon
European Championships
Silver medal – second place	2017 Kitzbühel	PTS3

Maike Hausberger (born 9 January 1995) is a German Paralympic cyclist who competes in international elite competitions, she is also a former Paralympic athlete and triathlete. Hausberger switched to cycling in 2017 because of sporting injuries in her track and field career.
