= Cycling at the 2024 Summer Paralympics – Women's time trial C1–3 =

Women's time trial C1–3 at the XVII Paralympic Games
- Venue: Vélodrome National, Saint-Quentin-en-Yvelines
- Dates: 31 August 2024
- Competitors: 11 from 10 nations
- Winning time: 36.676

Medalists
1st place, gold medalist(s)		Amanda Reid	Australia
2nd place, silver medalist(s)		Qian Wangwei	China
3rd place, bronze medalist(s)		Maike Hausberger	Germany

The women's time trial class C1-3 track cycling event at the 2024 Summer Paralympics took place on 31 August 2024 at the Vélodrome National at Saint-Quentin-en-Yvelines. This combine class (C1-3) under classification C is for cyclists who have impairments that affect their legs, arms, and/or trunk but are still capable to use a standard bicycle. 11 cyclists from 10 nations compete in this event.

== Competition format ==
The competition begins with the qualification round, where the 11 cyclists will compete in pairs. The top six cyclist will qualify to compete for gold, silver and bronze. The distance of this event is 500m.

A cyclist may have a different 'result time' than their real-time due to this event being a combined class event (C1-3), and some cyclists in their own class may have a disadvantage over other classes (for example due to speed), thus athlete factoring is used.

Despite this, different classifications have their own world and paralympic Games records

== Records ==
Women's C1 500m Time Trial
WR	Qian Wangwei	China	41.113	Glasgow	4 August 2023
PR	Qian Wangwei	China	41.403	Tokyo	2 August 2021
Women's C2 500m Time Trial
WR	Amanda Reid	Australia	38.162	Glasgow	6 August 2023
PR	Amanda Reid	Australia	38.487	Tokyo	27 August 2021
Women's C3 500m Time Trial
WR	Aniek van den Arssen	Australia	39.093	Saint-Quentin-En-Yvelines	20 October 2022
PR	Keiko Sugiura	Japan	39.869	Tokyo	27 August 2021

== Schedule ==
All times are Central European Summer Time (UTC+2)

Date	Time	Round
31 August	10:00	Qualifying
31 August	13:35	Final

== Results ==
=== Qualifying ===
The C1–3 500 m time trial is a multi-classification event. To ensure fairness, factoring is applied to the times of each cyclist based on their classification, and it is this factored time represents their result, both in qualification and, if that cyclist qualifies, the final. In a women's C1-2-3 track event, the factor for a C1 rider is 92.02, for a C2 is 94.50 and for a C3 is 100.00. The result of the cyclist is calculated as a percentage of the elapsed time, with the factor providing the relevant percentage.

Rank	Heat	Cyclist	Nation	Class	Real Time	Factor	Result	Notes
1	6	Amanda Reid	Australia	C2	38.663	94.50	36.537	Q
2	3	Qian Wangwei	China	C1	40.883 WR	92.02	37.621	Q
3	4	Maike Hausberger	Germany	C2	40.700	94.50	38.462	Q
4	5	Mel Pemble	Canada	C3	38.512 WR	100.00	38.512	Q
5	5	Wang Xiaomei	China	C3	39.029	100.00	39.029	Q
6	2	Sabrina Custódia	Brazil	C2	41.635	94.50	39.345	Q
7	6	Keiko Sugiura	Japan	C3	39.449	100.00	100.00	
8	3	Frances Brown	Great Britain	C1	42.905	92.02	39.481	
9	2	Flurina Rigling	Switzerland	C2	43.926	94.50	41.510	
10	4	Richael Timothy	Ireland	C3	41.937	100.00	41.937	
11	1	Jyoti Gaderiya	India	C2	52.098	94.50	49.233	

=== Final ===
Rank	Cyclist	Nation	Class	Real Time	Factor	Result
1st place, gold medalist(s)	Amanda Reid	Australia	C2	38.811	94.50	36.676
2nd place, silver medalist(s)	Qian Wangwei	China	C1	40.878 WR	92.02	37.616
3rd place, bronze medalist(s)	Maike Hausberger	Germany	C2	40.591	94.50	38.358
4	Mel Pemble	Canada	C3	38.610	100.00	38.610
5	Wang Xiaomei	China	C3	39.058	100.00	39.058
6	Sabrina Custódia	Brazil	C2	41.478	94.50	39.197
