= Jacqui Mengler-Mohr =

Australian sprint canoer

Personal information
- Nationality: Australian
- Born: 13 September 1978 (age 47)

Sport
- Sport: Track cycling
- Disability class: B
Medal record
Representing Australia
Women's para-cycling
Track World Championships
Gold medal – first place	2025 Rio de Janeiro	Mixed team sprint B
Silver medal – second place	2025 Rio de Janeiro	Tandem sprint B
Bronze medal – third place	2025 Rio de Janeiro	Time trial B
Women's canoe sprint
World Championships
Bronze medal – third place	1997 Dartmouth	K-1 200 m

Jacqui Mengler-Mohr (born 13 September 1978) is an Australian track cyclist who serves as the tandem pilot for Jessica Gallagher. She previously was a canoe sprinter.

== Career ==
Mengler began her career as a canoe sprinter and won a bronze medal in the K-1 200 m event at the 1997 ICF Canoe Sprint World Championships in Dartmouth.

On 19 August 2025, she was selected to compete at the 2025 UCI Para-cycling Track World Championships. She won a gold medal in the mixed team sprint B event with a world record time of 49.288. She also won a bronze medal in the 1 km time trial B event, with a time of 1:07.280.
