= Lennert Vanlathem =

Belgian Paralympic cyclist (born 1998)

Personal information
- National team: Belgium
- Born: 22 February 2000 (age 26) Zottegem, Flanders, Belgium

Sport
- Sport: para-cycling
- Disability class: C1
- Coached by: Remko Meeusen
Medal record
Men's para-cycling
Representing Belgium
Track World Championships
| Bronze medal – third place | 2025 Rio de Janeiro | Scratch C1 |
| Bronze medal – third place | 2025 Rio de Janeiro | Elimination C1 |

Lennert Vanlathem (born 22 February 2000) is a Belgian road and track para-cyclist.

== Personal life ==
Vanlathem was born in Zottegem, Belgium, grew up in Gelrode and lives in Oostduinkerke. When Vanlathem was 16 years old, he suffered a thrombosis that resulted in hemiplegia on the left side of his body. After a year and a half of rehabilitation, Vanlathem picked up para-cycling. Having started out on tricycles, he switched over to the faster two-wheelers.

== Career ==
In 2017, Vanlathem attended an open training session organized by Parasports Flanders at the Sport Vlaanderen Heusden-Zolder Velodroom Limburg, where he met Belgian champion Ewoud Vromant and top trainer Remko Meeusen. From that day on, he took up competitive para-cycling, and in 2023, he made his international debut, competing in the World Cups in Maniago and Ostend.

In October 2024, he won his first medals in an international championship, taking the bronze in both the scratch race and the elimination race at the 2025 UCI Para-cycling Track World Championships in Rio de Janeiro, Brazil.
