= Milan Thomas (para-cyclist) =

Belgian Para-cyclist (born 1998)

Personal information
- National team: Belgium
- Born: 4 April 1998 (age 28)

Sport
- Sport: para-cycling
- Disability class: MB
Medal record
Men's para-cycling
Representing Belgium
Road European Championships
Silver medal – second place	Upper Austria	Road Race MB
Track World Championships
Bronze medal – third place	2025 Rio de Janeiro	Sprint B

Milan Thomas (born 4 April 1998) is a Belgian road and track para-cyclist.

== Personal life ==
Thomas suffers from Stargardt disease. Having practiced athletics and cycling purely as an amateur, in March 2019, Thomas tried out tandem cycling for the first time at the Blind (Sports) Date, a low threshold sports activity organized by Parasports Flanders for people with disabilities.

== Career ==
Having formed at first a duo with his cousin and former Belgian professional road bicycle racer Bert Scheirlinckx, he subsequently formed a duo with Jonas Goeman. The pair won a silver medal at the 2022 UEC Para-Cycling Road European Championships in Upper Austria. The partnership ends in 2023 and Thomas finds a new pilot in Mathias Lefeber. With Lefeber, Thomas wins a bronze medal in the spint at the 2025 UCI Para-cycling Track World Championships in Rio de Janeiro, Brazil.
