= Erin Rowell =

Australian Paralympic cyclist

Personal information
- Nationality: Australian
- Born: 19 January 1983 (age 43)

Sport
- Country: Australia
- Sport: Cycling
- Disability class: C4
Medal record
Women's para-cycling
Representing Australia
Track World Championships
Gold medal – first place	2025 Rio de Janeiro	Sprint C4
Gold medal – first place	2025 Rio de Janeiro	Mixed team sprint C1–5
Bronze medal – third place	2022 Saint-Quentin-en-Yvelines	500 m Time Trial C5
Bronze medal – third place	2023 Glasgow	500 m Time Trial C4
Bronze medal – third place	2025 Rio de Janeiro	Elimination C4

Erin Rowell (née Normoyle) (born 19 January 1983) is an Australian para-cyclist, World Champion, World Championship medalist and Commonwealth Games medalist who represents Australia in international track cycling.

Rowell has won a UCI Para-cycling Track World Championship title, as well as medals across multiple World Championships. In 2026, she represented Australia at the Commonwealth Games in Glasgow, winning bronze in the women’s C4/C5 1000 m time trial and finishing fourth in the 4000 m individual pursuit.

Before transitioning to elite cycling, Rowell competed internationally in motocross.

== Personal ==
In 2010, Rowell was involved in a serious head-on motor vehicle accident near Red Bud, Illinois. She suffered multiple fractures to her leg, as well as chest and rib injuries. Rowell with her husband Ryan operate in the TORQ F1T fitness centre in Torquay, Victoria.

== Sport ==
In 2004, Rowell moved to the United States to pursue a career in motocross, competing internationally while also furthering her modelling career.

In 2022, Rowell became the first athlete from AusCycling’s Fast Track program to be selected to an Australian national team, earning selection for the 2022 UCI Para-cycling Track World Championships in Saint-Quentin-en-Yvelines, France.[3] She was classified as a C4 rider in 2024.

At the 2022 UCI Para-cycling Track World Championships in Saint-Quentin-en-Yvelines, Rowell won bronze in the Women’s C5 Time Trial and finished 11th in the Women’s C5 Individual Pursuit.[4]

At the 2023 UCI Para-cycling Track World Championships in Glasgow, Rowell won bronze in the Women’s C4 Time Trial.

At the 2024 UCI Para-cycling Track World Championships in Rio de Janeiro, Rowell finished fourth in the Women’s C4 Time Trial and ninth in the Women’s C4 Individual Pursuit.[5]

At the 2025 UCI Para-cycling Track World Championships in Rio de Janeiro, Rowell became a two-time World Champion, winning gold in the Women’s C4 Sprint and the Mixed C1–5 Team Sprint. She also won bronze in the Women’s C4 Elimination.[6]

In 2026, Rowell represented Australia at the Commonwealth Games in Glasgow, winning bronze in the Women’s C4/C5 1000 m Time Trial and finishing fourth in the Women’s C4/C5 4000 m Individual Pursuit.
