= Sabrina Custódia =

Brazilian para-cyclist (born 1991)

Personal information
- Full name: Sabrina Custódia da Silva
- Nationality: Brazilian
- Born: 11 September 1991 (age 35)

Sport
- Sport: Para-cycling
- Disability class: C2
Medal record
Women's para-cycling
Representing Brazil
Track World Championships
Gold medal – first place	2025 Rio de Janeiro	Time trial C2
Silver medal – second place	2022 Saint-Quentin-en-Yvelines	Time trial C2
Silver medal – second place	2024 Rio de Janeiro	Time trial C2
Silver medal – second place	2025 Rio de Janeiro	Sprint C2
Silver medal – second place	2025 Rio de Janeiro	Elimination C2
Bronze medal – third place	2025 Rio de Janeiro	Scratch race C2
Bronze medal – third place	2026 Apeldoorn	Time trial C2
Parapan American Games
Gold medal – first place	2023 Santiago	Time trial C1–5

Sabrina Custódia da Silva (born 11 September 1991) is a Brazilian para-cyclist. She represented Brazil at the 2024 Summer Paralympics.

== Career ==
In November 2023, Custódia competed at the 2023 Parapan American Games and won a gold medal in the time trial C1–5 event. She represented Brazil at the 2024 Summer Paralympics and finished in sixth place in the time trial C1–3 event.

She competed at the UCI Para-cycling Track World Championships and won silver medals in the time trial C2 event in 2022 and 2024. She competed at the 2025 UCI Para-cycling Track World Championships and won a gold medal in the 1 km time trial C2 event with a world record time of 1:20.020. She became the first Brazilian woman to hold the world record in the sport's history. She also won silver medals in the sprint and elimination races and a bronze medal in the scratch race.

== Personal life ==
Custódia was shocked by a high-voltage wire at 18 years old, resulting in the amputation of both hands, her right foot, and the toes on her left foot.
