= Darcy Thompson (cyclist) =

Australian cyclist

Personal information
- Full name: Darcy Thompson
- Nationality: Australian
- Born: 23 February 1997 (age 29) South Australia

Sport
- Disability class: C1
Medal record
Men's Cycling
Representing Australia
UCI Para-cycling Track World Championships
Silver medal – second place	2017 Los Angeles	Men's 1 km
Bronze medal – third place	2017 Los Angeles	Men's 3 km Individual Pursuit C1
Bronze medal – third place	2019 Apeldoorn	Men's Scratch Race C1

Darcy Thompson, is an Australian Paralympic cyclist with cerebral palsy. He won silver and bronze medals at the 2017 UCI Para-cycling Track World Championships in Los Angeles, United States.

== Personal ==
Thompson was born with cerebral palsy, which affects all four of his limbs as well as his speech. He attended Prince Alfred College in Adelaide.

== Cycling ==
Prior to taking up cycling, from 2009 to 2013 he was a member of the South Australian 7 a-side Paralympic Football team. He took up cycling in 2013.

At the 2016 UCI Para-cycling Track World Championships in Montichiari, Italy, he finished fifth in Men's 1 km Time Trial C1 and tenth in the Men's 3 km Individual Pursuit C1.

Thompson won silver medal in the Men's 1 km Time Trial C1 and bronze medal in the Men's 3 km Individual Pursuit C1 at the 2017 UCI Para-cycling Track World Championships in Los Angeles, United States

At the 2017 UCI Para-cycling Road World Championships, Pietermaritzburg, South Africa, he finished seventh in the Men's Time Trial C1 and seventh in the Men's Road Race C1-3.

At the 2019 UCI Para-cycling Track World Championships in Apeldoorn, Netherlands, he won the bronze medal in the Men's Scratch Race C1.

In 2017, he is a scholarship holder at the South Australian Sports Institute.
