= Siobhan Terry =

New Zealand para-cyclist (born 2000)

- Siobhan Terry (2026)

Personal information
- Born: Rotorua, New Zealand

Sport
- Country: New Zealand
- Sport: Para-cycling
- Disability: Clubfoot
- Disability class: C4
Medal record
Women's para-cycling
Representing New Zealand
Track World Championships
Silver medal – second place	2025 Rio de Janeiro	Elimination C4
Silver medal – second place	2025 Rio de Janeiro	Scratch C4
Silver medal – second place	2026 Apeldoorn	Scratch C4
Bronze medal – third place	2025 Rio de Janeiro	1 km time trial C4
Bronze medal – third place	2025 Rio de Janeiro	Sprint C4

Siobhan Terry is a New Zealand para-cyclist and para-swimmer.

== Career ==
Terry began her career in para-swimming. She became Rotorua's first para-swimmer to compete at the 2018 New Zealand Open Swimming Championships. She competed at the event with a broken collar bone, an injury she sustained playing touch rugby.

She switched to para-cycling in 2023, and made her international debut at the 2023 Oceania Track Cycling Championships, and won a bronze medal in the 500 metres time trial C4 event. On 9 September 2025, Terry was selected to represent New Zealand at the 2025 UCI Para-cycling Track World Championships. She made her UCI Para-cycling Track World Championships debut and won a silver medal in the elimination race which made its debut at the World Championships.

== Personal life ==
Terry was born with a left clubfoot.
