= Jody Cundy =

English cyclist and swimmer

Jody Cundy CBE
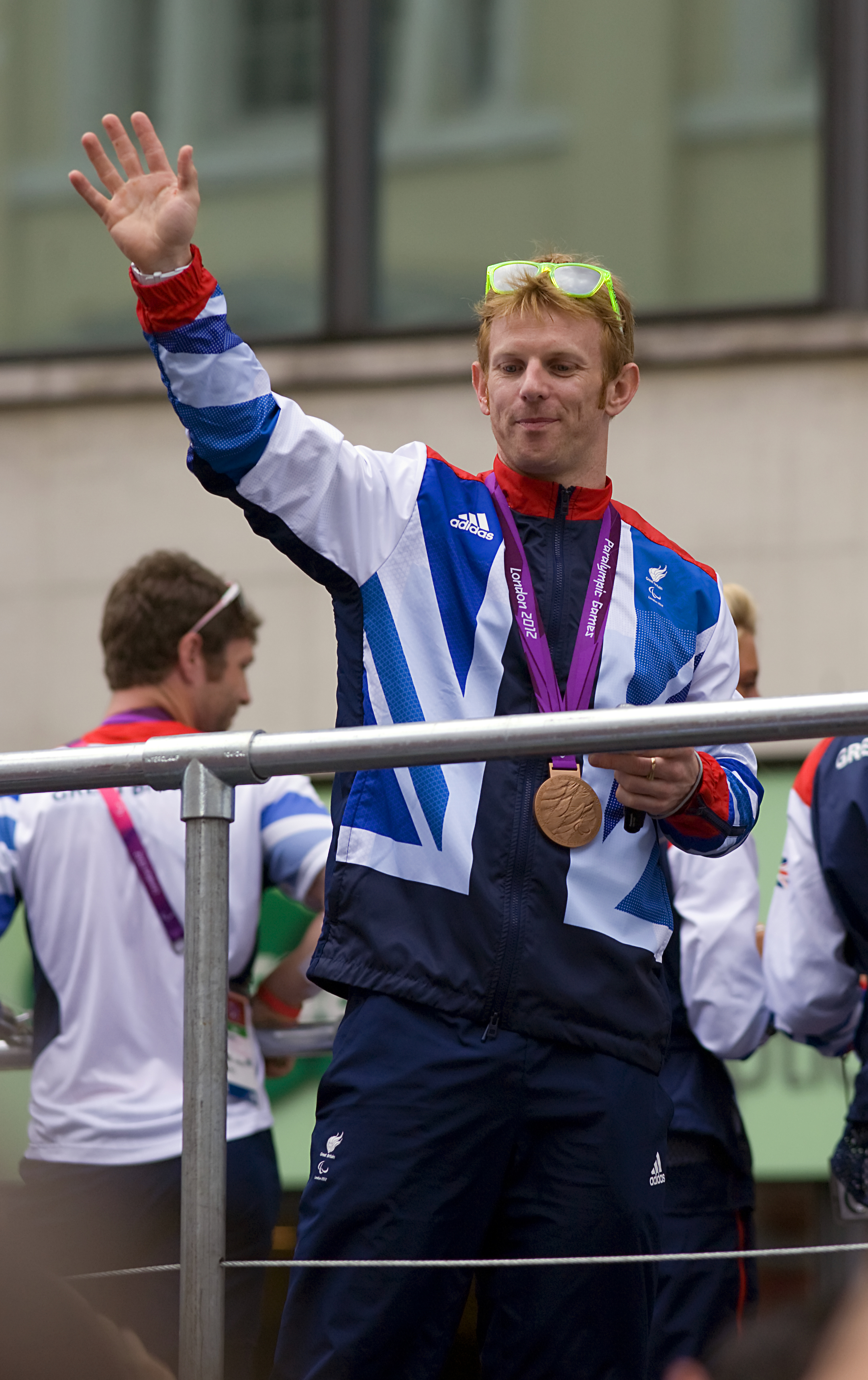
- Cundy at the Our Greatest Team Parade, 2012

Personal information
- Full name: Jody Alan Cundy
- Born: 14 October 1978 (age 48) Wisbech, England, United Kingdom
- Height: 172 cm (5 ft 8 in)
- Weight: 78 kg (172 lb)

Cycling career
- Sport: Cycling
- Current team: Para-T Cycling Team
- Discipline: Track
- Role: Rider
- Rider type: Sprinter

Amateur team
- Para-T Cycling Team
Medal record
Representing Great Britain
Men's para cycling
Paralympic Games
Gold medal – first place	2008 Beijing	Kilo (LC 2)
Gold medal – first place	2008 Beijing	Team Sprint
Gold medal – first place	2016 Rio de Janeiro	Kilo (C4-5)
Gold medal – first place	2016 Rio de Janeiro	Mixed Team Sprint (C1-5)
Gold medal – first place	2020 Tokyo	Mixed team sprint (C1–5)
Gold medal – first place	2024 Paris	Mixed team sprint C1–5
Silver medal – second place	2020 Tokyo	Kilo (C4-5)
Bronze medal – third place	2012 London	4km Pursuit (C4)
Track World Championships
Gold medal – first place	2006 Aigle	Kilo (LC 2)
Gold medal – first place	2007 Bordeaux	Kilo (LC 2)
Gold medal – first place	2007 Bordeaux	Team Sprint
Gold medal – first place	2009 Manchester	Kilo (LC 2)
Gold medal – first place	2009 Manchester	Mixed Team Sprint
Gold medal – first place	2011 Montichiari	Mixed Team Sprint
Gold medal – first place	2011 Montichiari	Kilo (C4)
Gold medal – first place	2012 Los Angeles	Kilo (C4)
Gold medal – first place	2014 Aguascalientes	Kilo (C4)
Gold medal – first place	2015 Apeldoorn	Kilo (C4)
Gold medal – first place	2016 Montichiari	Kilo (C4)
Gold medal – first place	2016 Montichiari	Mixed Team Sprint
Gold medal – first place	2017 Los Angeles	Kilo (C4)
Gold medal – first place	2018 Rio de Janeiro	Kilo (C4)
Gold medal – first place	2018 Rio de Janeiro	Mixed Team Sprint
Gold medal – first place	2019 Apeldoorn	Kilo (C4)
Gold medal – first place	2020 Milton	Kilo (C4)
Gold medal – first place	2022 Saint-Quentin-en-Yvelines	Kilo (C4)
Gold medal – first place	2022 Saint-Quentin-en-Yvelines	Mixed Team Sprint
Gold medal – first place	2023 Glasgow	Kilo (C4)
Gold medal – first place	2024 Rio de Janeiro	Kilo (C4)
Gold medal – first place	2025 Rio de Janeiro	Kilo (C4)
Gold medal – first place	2025 Rio de Janeiro	Sprint (C4)
Silver medal – second place	2011 Montichiari	Pursuit (C4)
Silver medal – second place	2012 Los Angeles	Mixed Team Sprint
Silver medal – second place	2019 Apeldoorn	Mixed Team Sprint
Silver medal – second place	2020 Milton	Mixed Team Sprint
Silver medal – second place	2023 Glasgow	Mixed team sprint C1–5
Silver medal – second place	2025 Rio de Janeiro	Mixed team sprint C1–5
Silver medal – second place	2026 Apeldoorn	Kilo (C4)
Silver medal – second place	2026 Apeldoorn	Mixed team sprint C1–5
Bronze medal – third place	2012 Los Angeles	Pursuit (C4)
Men's para swimming
Paralympic Games
Gold medal – first place	1996 Atlanta	S10 100m Butterfly
Gold medal – first place	2000 Sydney	4 x 100m 34 point Freestyle Relay
Gold medal – first place	2000 Sydney	S10 100m Butterfly
Bronze medal – third place	2000 Sydney	S10 100m Backstroke
Bronze medal – third place	2004 Athens	S10 100m Butterfly
World Championships
Gold medal – first place	1994 Malta	100m Butterfly (S10)
Gold medal – first place	2002 Mar Del Plata	100m Butterfly (S10)
Gold medal – first place	2002 Mar Del Plata	4 x 100m 34 Point Medley Relay
Silver medal – second place	1998 Christchurch	100m Butterfly (S10)
Bronze medal – third place	1994 Malta	100m Backstroke (S10)
Bronze medal – third place	2002 Mar Del Plata	4 x 100m 34 Point Freestyle Relay

Jody Alan Cundy (born 14 October 1978) is a British cyclist and former swimmer from Wisbech, England. He has represented Great Britain at eight Summer Paralympics winning nine Gold, one Silver and three Bronze medals across swimming and cycling events. He has also competed in multiple World Championships, winning 24 world titles (21 in Cycling and 3 in Swimming), the most recent coming at the World Championships in Rio de Janeiro in March 2024.

== Personal history ==
Cundy was born in Wisbech to Alan, a fitter-welder, and Ann, an accountancy clerk. He grew up in Norfolk along with his younger brother Ashley. Cundy was born with a deformed foot, which was amputated when he was three years old.

Cundy attended the University of Hertfordshire, based in Hatfield, where he was also a member of the town's swimming club. On 12 October 2012, Cundy was awarded an Honorary Doctorate from Anglia Ruskin University with a ceremony at the Cambridge Corn Exchange.

== Swimming career ==
When Cundy was aged 10, his parents met a disabled girl's parents and they discussed disability swimming. After some research, Cundy's parents decided to get him involved. Cundy showed early potential, breaking swimming records for his age group. After become a leading member of his local King's Lynn club's team, he made his international debut at the Swimming World Championships in Malta in 1994. He improved his personal best by four seconds and won the world 100m butterfly title. However, he later said that he was "never a naturally gifted swimmer. I don't have the build. I just worked very hard: 10 or 11 two-hour sessions in the pool each week, and weights and core strength work – 30 hours-plus a week." He later represented Great Britain three times in swimming at the Paralympic Games from 1996 to 2004, winning three gold and two bronze medals. After a 2004 Athens Paralympic Games that landed him a bronze medal, Cundy joined the high-performance swimming centre at Swansea.

== Cycling career ==
In 2006, he switched from swimming to cycling, competing at international events in the C4 disability category. Winning gold in the kilo in his debut at the 2006 world championships, he repeated this feat in 2007 and 2009 also taking the team sprint title at both events. Since switching to cycling he has been based in Manchester where he trains with the Great Britain Cycling squad.

Representing Great Britain at the 2008 Summer Paralympics in Beijing, Cundy broke the world record on the way to winning the gold in the 1km Time Trial with a time of 1 minute 5.466 seconds.

He was selected for the Great Britain team at the 2012 Summer Paralympics. He was expected to win gold in the C4/5 Men's 1 km time trial, but slipped shortly after starting, which he argued was due to the starting gate not working properly. The technical delegate of the International Cycling Union, Louis Barbeau, disagreed, refusing him a restart. Cundy then erupted into a rage, swearing and throwing water bottles. He later apologised to the crowd, though made clear that he still disagreed with the decision. He won bronze in the C4 men's 4 km pursuit, racing Diego Gomez of Colombia. In the first kilometre of the race, he clocked a time of 1:05.317 in the heats, which would have won the 1 km time trial.

Cundy aimed to qualify for the England team for the 2014 Commonwealth Games, but he abandoned this hope after placing fifth among English competitors and eighth overall in the 1km time trial at the 2013 British National Track Championships, despite setting a new personal best and a world record for the C4 category. Subsequently, he won gold at the 2014 UCI Para-cycling Track World Championships in Aguascalientes in the C4 1 km time trial, earning his ninth world title and breaking his own world record with a time of 1:01.466.

In 2015 and 2016, Cundy remained undefeated in the 1 km TT. In addition to his 2016 Kilo Gold Medal, he became a double world champion with British Cycling teams mates Louis Rolfe and Jon-Allan Butterworth winning in a new world record time at the World Championships in Montichari, Italy in March.

At the 2016 Summer Paralympics in Rio, Cundy regained his Kilo Paralympic title in a new Paralympic record of 1:04.492 which when factored for C4 athletes gave a winning time of 1:02.473 In the final track cycling event of the 2016 Summer Paralympics Cundy teamed up with Louis Rolfe and Jon-Allan Butterworth to take the Mixed Team Sprint C1-5 gold medal in a world-record time of 48.635.

Cundy was appointed Member of the Order of the British Empire (MBE) in the 2009 New Year Honours for services to disabled sport, and Officer of the Order of the British Empire (OBE) in the 2017 New Year Honours for services to cycling and swimming.

At the 2020 Paralympic games in Tokyo, he took home the Silver in the C4-5 1 km Time Trial behind Spanish C5 Athlete Alfonso Cabello. Two days later he teamed up with Kadeena Cox and Jaco van Gass to take Gold, in a new WR time of, 47.579 in the C1-5 Mixed 750m Team Sprint ahead of the current world champions China.

In winning his silver medal at the Tokyo Paralmypics he became the first male Great British athlete to medal at 7 consecutive Paralympic Games.

Cundy was appointed Commander of the Order of the British Empire (CBE) in the 2022 New Year Honours for services to cycling.

== Television ==
Cundy was a contestant on the twenty-first series of the celebrity dance competition Strictly Come Dancing. Cundy and his professional dancer partner, Jowita Przystał, were eliminated in week 4, on 15 October 2023, after a dance-off with Eddie Kadi and his partner, Karen Hauer.
