= Hannah van Kampen =

New Zealand cyclist

Personal information
- Full name: Hannah van Kampen
- Born: 8 May 1993 (age 33)

Cycling career
- Sport: Cycling
- Disciplines: Road; Track
- Role: Rider

Amateur team
- 2015: Ramblers Club
Medal record
Women's para-cycling
Representing New Zealand
Track World Championships
Gold medal – first place	2019 Apeldoorn	Individual pursuit tandem
Gold medal – first place	2020 Milton	Individual pursuit tandem
Bronze medal – third place	2019 Apeldoorn	Kilo tandem
Bronze medal – third place	2020 Milton	Kilo tandem
Road World Championships
Gold medal – first place	2019 Emmen	Road race tandem
Silver medal – second place	2019 Emmen	Time trial tandem

Hannah van Kampen (born 8 May 1993) is a New Zealand cyclist. She represented New Zealand at the 2016 Summer Paralympics as the sighted pilot for Amanda Cameron. As the sighted pilot for Emma Foy, she won a gold and bronze medal at the 2019 UCI Para-cycling Track World Championships in Apeldoorn, and a gold and silver medal at the 2019 UCI Para-cycling Road World Championships in Emmen, Netherlands.

Van Kampen and Foy retained their world title in the women's individual pursuit tandem at the 2020 UCI Para-cycling Track World Championships. They also claimed the bronze medal in the women's time trial tandem.
