= Jessica Gallagher =

Australian Paralympic alpine skier

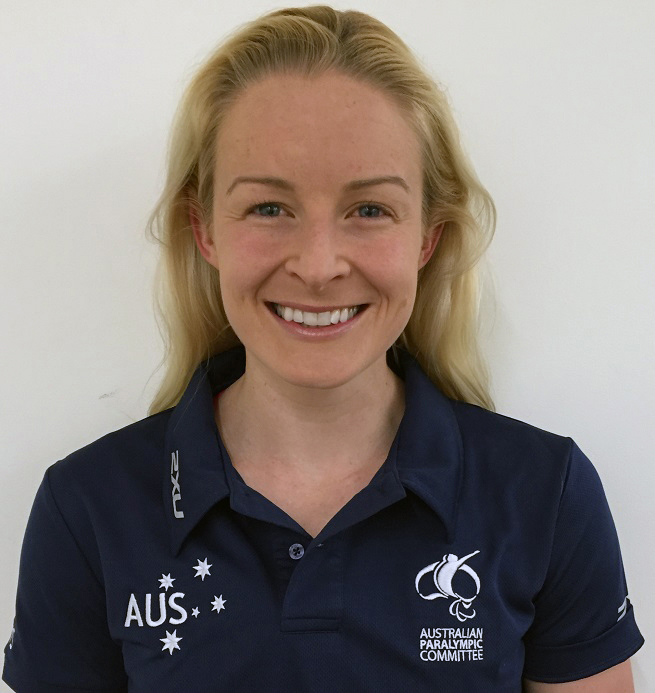
- 2016 Australian Paralympic team portrait of Gallagher

Personal information
- Born: 14 March 1986 (age 40) Geelong, Victoria

Sport
- Country: Australia
- Sport: Alpine Skiing; Field athletics Track cycling
Medal record
Representing Australia
Women's para alpine skiing
Winter Paralympic Games
Bronze medal – third place	2010 Vancouver	Slalom visually impaired
Bronze medal – third place	2014 Sochi	Giant slalom visually impaired
Women's para athletics
World Championships
Silver medal – second place	2011 Christchurch	Long jump F13
Bronze medal – third place	2011 Christchurch	Javelin F13
Women's para track cycling
Summer Paralympic Games
Silver medal – second place	2024 Paris	Time trial B
Bronze medal – third place	2016 Rio de Janeiro	Tandem time trial B
Track World Championships
Gold medal – first place	2016 Montichiari	Tandem sprint B
Gold medal – first place	2025 Rio de Janeiro	Mixed team sprint B
Silver medal – second place	2018 Rio de Janeiro	Tandem time trial B
Silver medal – second place	2018 Rio de Janeiro	Tandem sprint B
Silver medal – second place	2019 Apeldoorn	Tandem sprint B
Silver medal – second place	2022 Saint-Quentin-en-Yvelines	Tandem sprint B
Silver medal – second place	2022 Saint-Quentin-en-Yvelines	Tandem time trial B
Silver medal – second place	2023 Glasgow	Tandem time trial B
Silver medal – second place	2023 Glasgow	Tandem sprint B
Silver medal – second place	2025 Rio de Janeiro	Tandem sprint B
Bronze medal – third place	2016 Montichiari	Tandem time trial B
Bronze medal – third place	2024 Rio de Janeiro	500m time trial C1
Bronze medal – third place	2024 Rio de Janeiro	Tandem sprint B
Bronze medal – third place	2025 Rio de Janeiro	1 km time trial B
Commonwealth Games
Gold medal – first place	2022 Birmingham	Tandem sprint B
Gold medal – first place	2022 Birmingham	Tandem time trial B
Silver medal – second place	2026 Glasgow	Tandem sprint B

Jessica Gallagher (born 14 March 1986) is an Australian Paralympic alpine skier, track and field athlete, tandem cyclist and rower. She was Australia's second female Winter Paralympian, and the first Australian woman to win a medal at the Winter Paralympics at the 2010 Vancouver Games. She competed at the 2014 Winter Paralympics in Sochi, where she won a bronze medal in the women's giant slalom visually impaired.

She is legally blind, and represents Australia internationally in three sports: skiing, athletics and cycling. Besides her skiing achievements, she has represented Australia in athletics at the 2012 Summer Paralympics in London, and won a silver and a bronze medal at the 2011 Christchurch IPC Athletics World Championships in long jump and javelin, respectively. She has also represented the state of Victoria as a junior in netball and basketball. Gallagher was selected in the Australian cycling team with her pilot Madison Janssen for the 2016 Rio Paralympics. Her "long term goal is to be the first Australian to medal at a summer and winter Paralympics or Olympics". This was achieved when she won a bronze medal in the women's B/VI 1000m time trial in Rio.

She has been selected in track cycling at the 2024 Paris Paralympics- her fourth Paralympics (two winter and two summer).

== Personal ==
Wikinews reporters interview Australian Paralympic skier Jessica Gallagher and her guide Eric Bickerton

Gallagher was born on 14 March 1986 and lives in the Geelong suburb of Highton. In 2009, she graduated from RMIT University with a Master of Osteopathy, and is a registered osteopath.

At the time of the 2010 Vancouver Winter Paralympics, she was dating the American Paralympic sitting ski slalomer Gerald Hayden. She is an ambassador for the Australian Paralympic Committee, Vision Australia, Seeing Eye Dogs Australia, Vision 2020 Australia, Kx Pilates and 2XU.

She is legally blind due to Best's disease, a rare condition. She started to lose her eyesight when she was a teenager, having received the results of tests while she was competing at the U17 national netball championships.

Gallagher was selected to compete at the 2008 Beijing Paralympics in long jump, 100m, shot put and discus, but she failed her classification test because the classifiers said the eyesight in her right eye was 0.01% better than it needed to be. In November 2009, her classification was revisited due to deterioration of her vision and she was deemed eligible to compete.

Gallagher was appointed to the Board of Vision 2020 Australia in June 2015 and is also a member of its Member, Finance and Audit Committee.

In March 2018 she was inducted into the Victorian Honour Roll of Women. In December 2023, Gallagher was awarded Honorary Doctor of Social Science by RMIT University.

== Sports ==
=== Netball, basketball and snowboarding ===
She played netball and basketball with able-bodied competitors, having first participated at the elite level in both sports as she started to lose her vision. In netball, she was a goal keeper and goal attack, represented Victoria several times and was named as an emergency for the Australian U16 team. In the Victorian league's Championship Division, she represented both Palladians and Altona Lightning. In basketball, she represented the Geelong Cats for five years and also represented Victoria Country. At that time, her goal was to become a professional netball or basketball player. As well, she played netball in the Geelong Football Netball League, representing South Barwon and Leopold. Despite her low vision and missing one third of the games due to her Paralympic training program, she won the A grade Best and Fairest Award in 2007, representing Leopold.

Gallagher is also a snowboarder, having taken up the sport while on a working holiday in Vail, Colorado before she found out about the Winter Paralympic Games.

=== Competitive skiing ===
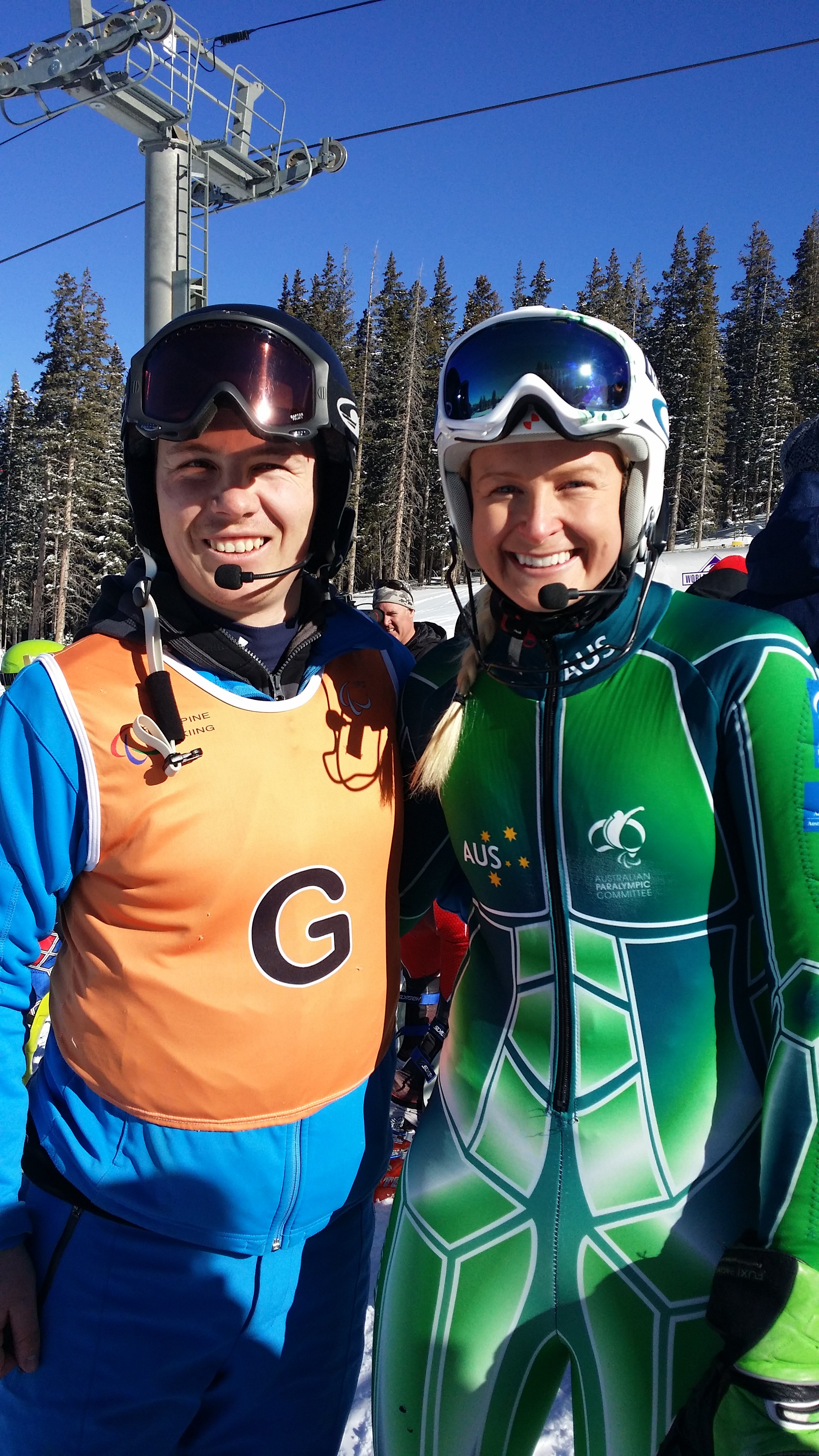
Jessica Gallagher with sighted guide Christian Geiger in December 2013. The microphones allow them to communicate with each other.

Gallagher was the first Australian woman to win a medal at the Winter Paralympics, and Australia's second female Winter Paralympian. She was given the opportunity to compete at the highest levels in skiing after being identified during a talent search and because of her snowboarding experience. As she is blind, she competes with a guide with Eric Bickerton being her first guide. She is coached by Steve Graham, who also coached Michael Milton and is the current head coach of the Australian Institute of Sport's Winter Paralympic program. Her Australian training base is at the Victorian Institute of Sport's training centre located at Lakeside Stadium in South Melbourne. While actively training six days a week, her individual training sessions will last between two and three hours each a total of ten to twelve sessions by the end of the week.

Gallagher first represented Australia in 2009 at the New Zealand Winter Games, where she won a gold medal. In January 2010, she competed at her first IPC Alpine Skiing World Cup event in Austria and won a bronze medal in slalom. Before the start of the 2010 Games, she had competed in nine World Cup events. On her 24th birthday, she won a bronze medal at the Vancouver games in the women's slalom visually impaired event, becoming the first Australian woman to do so. In her first and second time down the hill, she finished third both times, She also competed in the women's giant slalom visually impaired event at the 2010 Games, finishing seventh after headset issues that caused problems with communication.

In 2013, at the IPC Alpine Skiing World Cup in Thredbo, New South Wales, several weeks after taking on her new guide, Christian Geiger, she won two silver medals in giant slalom and slalom. At the 2014 Sochi Paralympics, Gallagher (guided by Geiger) won a bronze medal in the women's giant slalom visually impaired and came seventh in the women's giant slalom visually impaired.

She has been in the Australian Institute of Sport Alpine Skiing Program since 2009.

Australia's National Sports Museum put several items related to her on display after her bronze medal win at the 2010 Vancouver Games.

=== Competitive athletics ===
Gallagher is an athletics competitor, competing in long jump, discus, shot put, javelin and sprinting, She became involved in athletics after learning about the Paralympics. At the skills assessment, the classifiers had her try shot put and, despite being dressed in casual athletic attire, she managed a throw that met the Paralympic qualifying distance. After a year of training, she increased this initial distance by 2.5 metres (8 ft 2 in) to have a personal best throw of over 12 metres (39 ft). She holds several records in the F13 classification, including Australian and Oceanian records in the long jump, javelin and shot put, and an Australian record in discus. In athletics, her coaches have included Mike Edwards and John Boas. In January 2011, she competed at the 2011 Christchurch IPC Athletics World Championships, where she finished second in the long jump and third in the javelin throw event, with a throw of 33.75 metres (110.7 ft). Her appearance at the championships marked her return to the sport after having taken a break to compete in skiing.

At the 2012 London Paralympics, Gallagher competed in the women's long jump F13 and women's javelin throw F12/13 events, finishing fifth and sixth respectively. Gallagher was disappointed with these results, having suffered a severe tear in her meniscus during training that forced her to use crutches in the month leading up to the competition.

In a 2014 interview Gallagher expressed what competing at Summer and Winter Paralympics meant to her. She said: I love the unique cultural experience each host city brings. Ultimately, competing for your country on the world's biggest sporting stage is a pinnacle. It brings memories and experiences that last a lifetime.

=== Competitive cycling ===
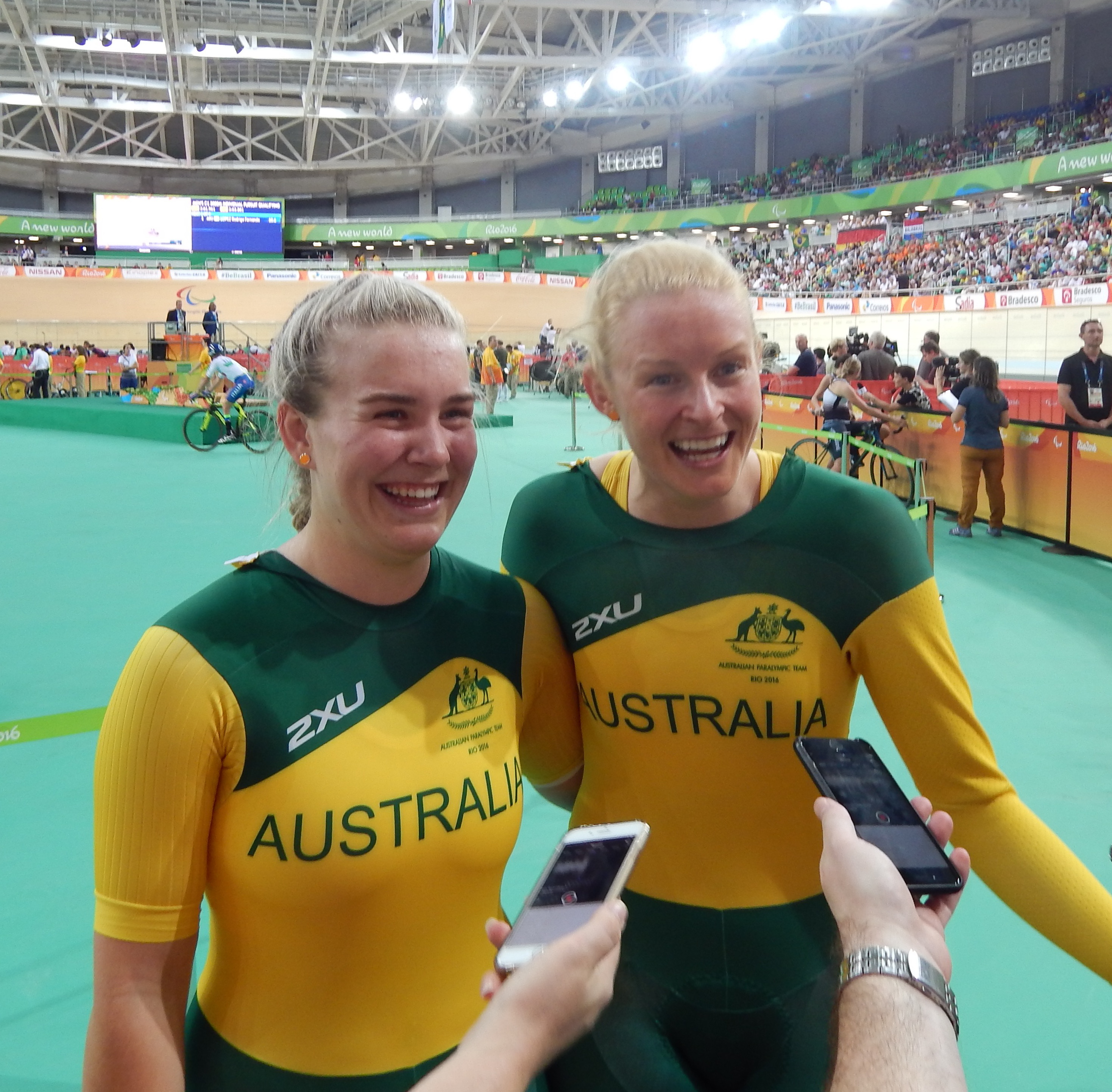
Gallagher (right) and pilot Madison Janssen (left) are all smiles after winning a bronze medal in the women's B/VI 1000m time trial final

Gallagher was encouraged to take up cycling by Victorian Institute of Sport coach Glenn Doney. The decision to transfer to cycling was made easier after her favourite athletics event, the long jump, was not included on the 2016 Rio Paralympics athletics program. Gallagher believes that track cycling is easier than downhill skiing. She said: "Being a skier, the guide is not connected to me like on a tandem and so I need to ski at high speeds under incredibly intense variabilities that constantly change. The velodrome is a stable environment." At the 2016 UCI Para-cycling Track World Championships in Montichiari, Italy, Gallagher and her pilot Madison Janssen made their international debut. They won the gold medal in the women's Sprint B in world record time and the bronze in the women's 1 km Time Trial B. In September 2016, she became the first Australian to medal in both the Summer and Winter Paralympics when she won a bronze medal in the women's B/VI 1000m time trial at the 2016 Summer Paralympics in Rio de Janeiro with Janssen. They finished ninth in the women's individual pursuit B.

At the 2018 UCI Para-cycling Track World Championships, Rio de Janeiro, Brazil, with Madison Janssen she won silver medals in the women's tandem time trial and sprint.

At the 2019 UCI Para-cycling Track World Championships in Apeldoorn, Netherlands, with Madison Janssen she won the silver medal in The Women's Tandem Spring and finished fourth in the women's Time Trial.

At the 2022 Commonwealth Games in Birmingham, England, Gallagher won gold medals in the women's tandem sprint B and time trial B with pilot Caitlin Ward.

At the 2022 UCI Para-cycling Track World Championships in Saint-Quentin-en-Yvelines, France, with Caitlin Ward won two silver medals – Women's Sprint B and Women's Time Trial B.

At the 2024 UCI Para-cycling Track World Championships in Rio de Janeiro, Brazil, with Caitlin Ward won two bronze medals – Women's Sprint B and Women's Time Trial B.

At the 2025 UCI Para-cycling Track World Championships in Rio de Janeiro, Brazil, she won the gold medal in the Mixed Team Sprint B, silver medal in the Women's Tandem Sprint B and the bronze medal in the Women's Tandem Time Trial. Her pilot was Jacqui Mengler-Mohr.

=== Competitive rowing ===
Gallagher with Alexandra Viney, Tom Birthwhistle, James Talbot and Teesaan Koo (cox) finished fourth in the PR3 Mixed Coxed Four at the 2022 World Rowing Championships. At the 2023 World Rowing Championships, Gallagher with her crew of Tom Birtwhistle, Harrison Nichols, Susannah Lutze, and cox Teesan Koo, finished fourth in the PR3 Mixed Coxed Four.
