= Ivan Ermakov (cyclist) =

Russian para-cyclist (born 1992)

Personal information
- Native name: Иван Ермаков
- Nationality: Russian
- Born: 24 December 1992 (age 33)

Sport
- Sport: Para-cycling
- Disability class: C1
Medal record
Men's para-cycling
Representing Individual Neutral Athletes
Track World Championships
Silver medal – second place	2025 Rio de Janeiro	Scratch race C1
Silver medal – second place	2025 Rio de Janeiro	Elimination C1
Bronze medal – third place	2025 Rio de Janeiro	Time trial C1
Bronze medal – third place	2025 Rio de Janeiro	Sprint C1
Representing Russia
Track World Championships
Silver medal – second place	2019 Apeldoorn	Scratch race C1

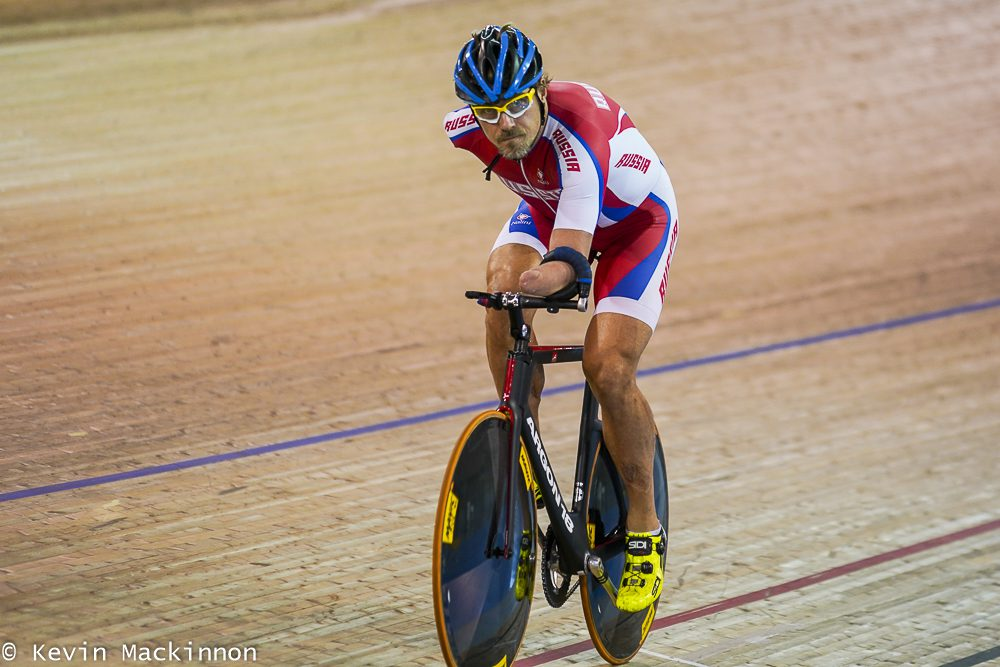
Russia’s Ivan Ermakov. ParaOlympian Photo: Kevin Mackinnon Triathalon Magazine

Ivan Vitalyevich Ermakov (Russian: Иван Витальевич Ермаков; born 24 December 1992) is a Russian para-cyclist.

== Career ==
Ermakov competed at the 2019 UCI Para-cycling Track World Championships and won a silver medal in the scratch race C1 event. He again competed at the 2025 UCI Para-cycling Track World Championships and won a silver medal in the scratch race C1 event and a bronze medal in the 1 km time trial C1 event with a time of 1:17.657.
