= Tahlia Clayton-Goodie =

Australian para-cyclist (born 1987)

- Tahlia Clayton-Goodie (2026)

Personal information
- Nationality: Australian
- Born: 17 January 1987 (age 39)
- Home town: Geelong, Australia

Sport
- Sport: Para-cycling
- Disability: Hemiparesis
- Disability class: C1
- Club: Geelong-Surf Coast Cycling Club
Medal record
Women's para-cycling
Representing Australia
Road World Championships
Gold medal – first place	2025 Ronse	Time trial C1
Gold medal – first place	2025 Ronse	Road race C1
Gold medal – first place	2026 Huntsville	Time trial C1
Silver medal – second place	2026 Huntsville	Road Race C1
Track World Championships
Gold medal – first place	2025 Rio de Janeiro	Sprint C1
Gold medal – first place	2025 Rio de Janeiro	Scratch race C1
Gold medal – first place	2025 Rio de Janeiro	Time trial C1
Gold medal – first place	2025 Rio de Janeiro	Elimination C1
Gold medal – first place	2026 Apeldoorn	Elimination C1
Silver medal – second place	2026 Apeldoorn	Sprint C1
Silver medal – second place	2026 Apeldoorn	Scratch race C1
Silver medal – second place	2026 Apeldoorn	Time trial C1

Tahlia Clayton-Goodie (born 17 January 1987) is an Australian para-cyclist who competes in road and track events. She is a three-time Road World Champion and five-time Track World Champion.

== Career ==
She began cycling at the age of four but stopped when undertaking university studies. She was identified by Paralympics Australia Pathways Academy Program. On 3 July 2025, Clayton-Goodie was selected to represent Australia at the 2025 UCI Para-cycling Road World Championships. She won a gold medal in the time trial C1 event with a time of 19:34.82. She also won a gold medal in the road race C1 event with a time of 2:02:13. In October 2025, she competed at the 2025 UCI Para-cycling Track World Championships and won gold medals in the sprint, scratch race, elimination race and 1 km time trial C1 events. She set a world record in the time trial with a time of 1:25.366.

At the 2025 UCI Para-cycling Track World Championships in Rio de Janeiro, Brazil, she won four gold medals - Women's Sprint C1, Women's Scratch Race C1, Women's Time Trial C1and Women's Elimination C1.

== Personal life ==
A mountain bike crash in 2011 left her with serious injuries and with hemiparesis on the right side of her body. She is a mother of two and lives in Geelong, Victoria.

== Recognition ==
- 2025 - AusCycling Para-cycling Track Female Athlete of the Year
