= Flurina Rigling =

Swiss Paralympic cyclist (born 1996)

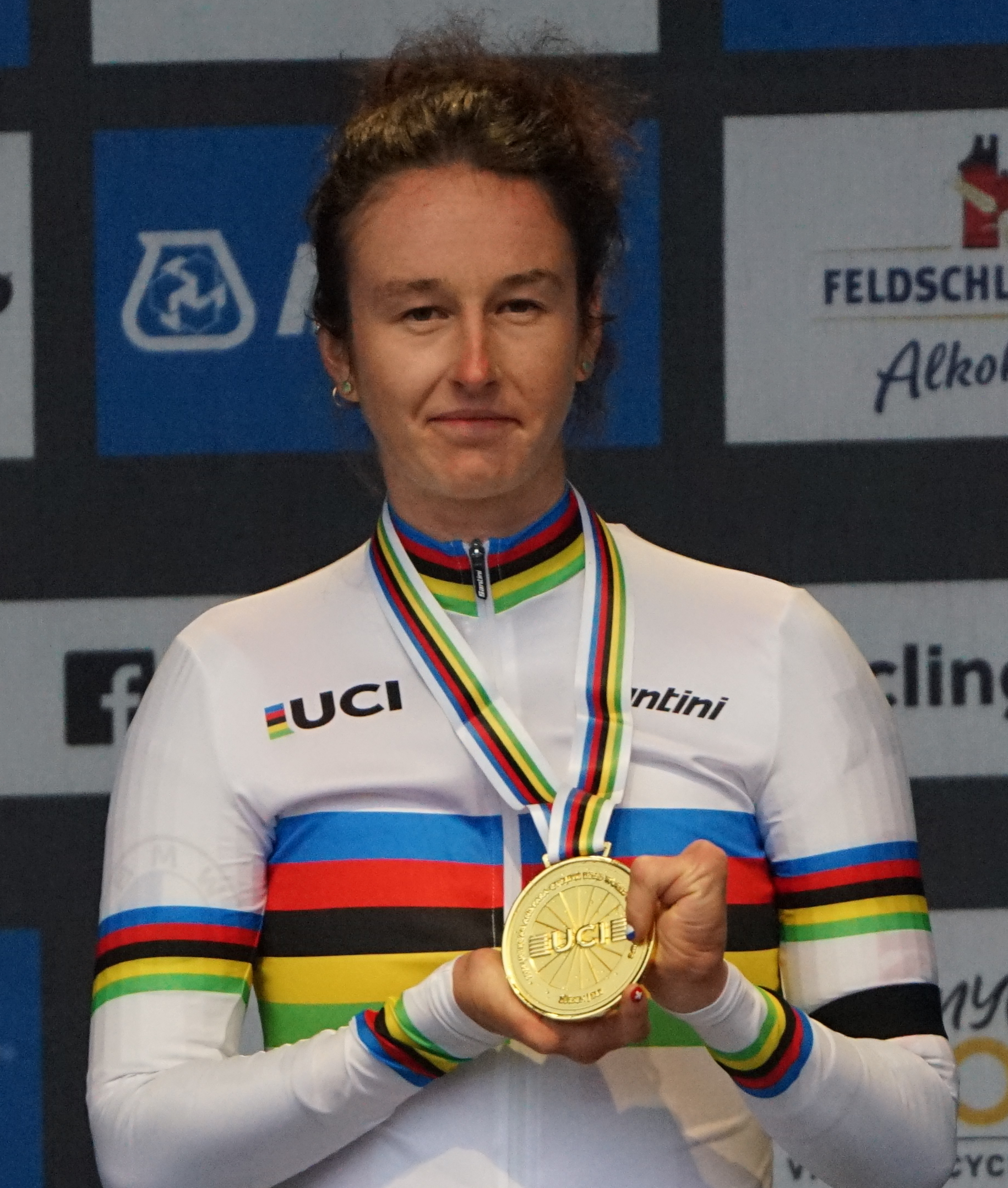
- Rigling at the 2024 Road World Championships

Personal information
- Born: 22 September 1996 (age 30) Hedingen, Switzerland

Sport
- Sport: Para cycling
- Disability class: C2
Medal record
Representing Switzerland
Paralympic Games
Silver medal – second place	2024 Paris	Road race C1–3
Bronze medal – third place	2024 Paris	Individual pursuit C1-3
Road World Championships
Gold medal – first place	2023 Glasgow	Road race C2
Gold medal – first place	2024 Zurich	Time trial C2
Gold medal – first place	2024 Zurich	Road race C2
Gold medal – first place	2025 Ronse	Time trial C2
Gold medal – first place	2025 Ronse	Road race C2
Silver medal – second place	2021 Cascais	Time trial C2
Silver medal – second place	2022 Baie-Comeau	Time trial C2
Silver medal – second place	2023 Glasgow	Time trial C2
Bronze medal – third place	2021 Cascais	Road race C2
Bronze medal – third place	2022 Baie-Comeau	Road race C2
Track World Championships
Gold medal – first place	2022 Saint-Quentin-en-Yvelines	Individual pursuit C2
Gold medal – first place	2023 Glasgow	Individual pursuit C2
Gold medal – first place	2024 Rio de Janeiro	Omnium C2
Gold medal – first place	2025 Rio de Janeiro	Scratch race C1-2
Gold medal – first place	2025 Rio de Janeiro	Sprint C2
Gold medal – first place	2025 Rio de Janeiro	Elimination C2
Gold medal – first place	2026 Apeldoorn	Time trial C2
Gold medal – first place	2026 Apeldoorn	Scratch race C2
Gold medal – first place	2026 Apeldoorn	Sprint C2
Gold medal – first place	2026 Apeldoorn	Elimination C2
Silver medal – second place	2022 Saint-Quentin-en-Yvelines	Scratch race C2
Silver medal – second place	2022 Saint-Quentin-en-Yvelines	Omnium C2
Silver medal – second place	2023 Glasgow	Omnium C2
Silver medal – second place	2024 Rio de Janeiro	Scratch race C2
Silver medal – second place	2025 Rio de Janeiro	Time trial C2
Bronze medal – third place	2022 Saint-Quentin-en-Yvelines	Time trial C2
Bronze medal – third place	2023 Glasgow	Scratch race C2
Bronze medal – third place	2024 Rio de Janeiro	Time trial C2
European Para Championships
Gold medal – first place	2023 Rotterdam	Road race C2
Gold medal – first place	2023 Rotterdam	Road time trial C2

Flurina Rigling (born 22 September 1996) is a Swiss Paralympic cyclist who competes in international cycling competitions. She is a five-time World champion in road cycling and six-time World champion in track cycling. She represented Switzerland at the 2024 Summer Paralympics.

== Personal life ==
Rigling was born with missing fingers in her hands and one toe on each of her feet.
