= Mel Pemble =

Canadian para competitor

Personal information
- Full name: Melissa Pemble
- National team: Canada
- Born: April 22, 2000 (age 26) Lancashire, England
- Home town: Victoria, British Columbia, Canada
- Website: melpemble.weebly.com

Sport
- Sport: Para alpine skiing; Para cycling
- Disability class: C3

Achievements and titles
- World finals: 2022 UCI Para-cycling Track World Championships: Omnium C3; gold; 2022 UCI Para-cycling Track World Championships: Scratch race C3; gold; 2023 UCI Para-cycling Track World Championships: Omnium C3; gold; 2023 Parapan American Games: Pursuit C1–3; gold; 2023 Parapan American Games: Time trial C1–5; silver
Medal record
Women's track cycling
Representing Canada
Track World Championships
Gold medal – first place	2022 Saint-Quentin	Omnium C3
Gold medal – first place	2022 Saint-Quentin	Scratch race C3
Gold medal – first place	2023 Glasgow	Omnium C3
Gold medal – first place	2025 Rio de Janeiro	Sprint C3
Silver medal – second place	2023 Glasgow	Scratch race C3
Silver medal – second place	2024 Rio de Janeiro	Time trial C3
Silver medal – second place	2025 Rio de Janeiro	Time trial C3
Silver medal – second place	2025 Rio de Janeiro	Elimination race C3
Silver medal – second place	2026 Apeldoorn	Time trial C3
Bronze medal – third place	2023 Glasgow	Time trial C3
Bronze medal – third place	2024 Rio de Janeiro	Omnium C3
Bronze medal – third place	2025 Rio de Janeiro	Scratch race C3
Bronze medal – third place	2026 Apeldoorn	Sprint C3
Parapan American Games
Gold medal – first place	2023 Santiago	Pursuit C1–3
Silver medal – second place	2023 Santiago	Time trial C1–5

Melissa Pemble (born April 22, 2000) is a Canadian para alpine skier and para cyclist. She won back-to-back gold medals in omnium C3 at the 2022 and 2023 UCI Para-cycling Track World Championships. She won two medals in para-cycling at the 2023 Parapan American Games.

== Early life and education ==
Pemble was born in Lancashire, England with cerebral palsy affecting her right side. Her parents thought it would be good for her to take up a sport to help with her balance and coordination. She moved to Victoria, British Columbia at age 9 with her parents. She twisted her knee after an early skiing lesson in France, but took up para-skiing again after moving to Canada.

Pemble graduated from the Canadian Sports School-Victoria.

== Career ==
=== Para-skiing ===
At the 2015 Canada Winter Games, Pemble won the women’s Giant Slalom Para female race. She also won a silver medal in slalom para alpine skiing at the Games.

Pemble competed at the 2018 Winter Paralympics as the youngest Canadian skier at the games. She finished eleventh in women's giant slalom, and women's super-G, and ninth in women's downhill and women's super combined. She did not finish in women's slalom.

She competed at the 2019 World Para Alpine Skiing Championships. Pemble made the decision to end her para-skiing career in 2020.

=== Para-cycling ===
When she was 14, the Canadian Sport Institute Pacific's Podium Search program identified Pemble for para-cycling. She competed at the provincial level and used the sport as cross-training for skiing. She was coached by Kurt Innes, who later coached her upon her return to the sport in 2020 after a five-year break from the sport.

She made her world debut in para-cycling competing at the 2022 UCI Para-cycling Track World Championships, at which she won a gold medal in omnium and scratch race. She set a para-cycling world record in the non-medaled 200-metre sprint in 2022. She also placed third in the 500m time trial and fourth in the four-kilometre individual pursuit.

At the 2023 UCI Para-cycling Track World Championships, Pemble won gold in omnium, a bronze medal in the time trial event, and a silver in the women’s C3 scratch race.

Pemble competed at the 2023 Parapan American Games in Santiago, Chile. She won the gold medal in the women's 3,000-metre C1-3 individual pursuit. She finished fourth in the women's individual road race C1–3 and seventh in the women's individual road time trial C1–5.

She won a silver medal in the women’s C3 500m time trial and a bronze medal in the women's C3 omnium at the 2024 UCI Para Cycling Track World Championships. Also at the 2024 UCI Para Cycling Championships, Pemble placed 5th in the Individual Pursuit and 6th in the Scratch Race.

Pemble competed in para-cycling at the 2024 Summer Paralympics where she set the world record for the 500m time trial in the C3 category. At the 2025 UCI Para-cycling Track World Championships, she won a gold medal in the women’s C3 sprint, silver in the kilo and in the elimination race, and a bronze in the scratch race.
