= Tandem (UCI) =

Para-cycling classification

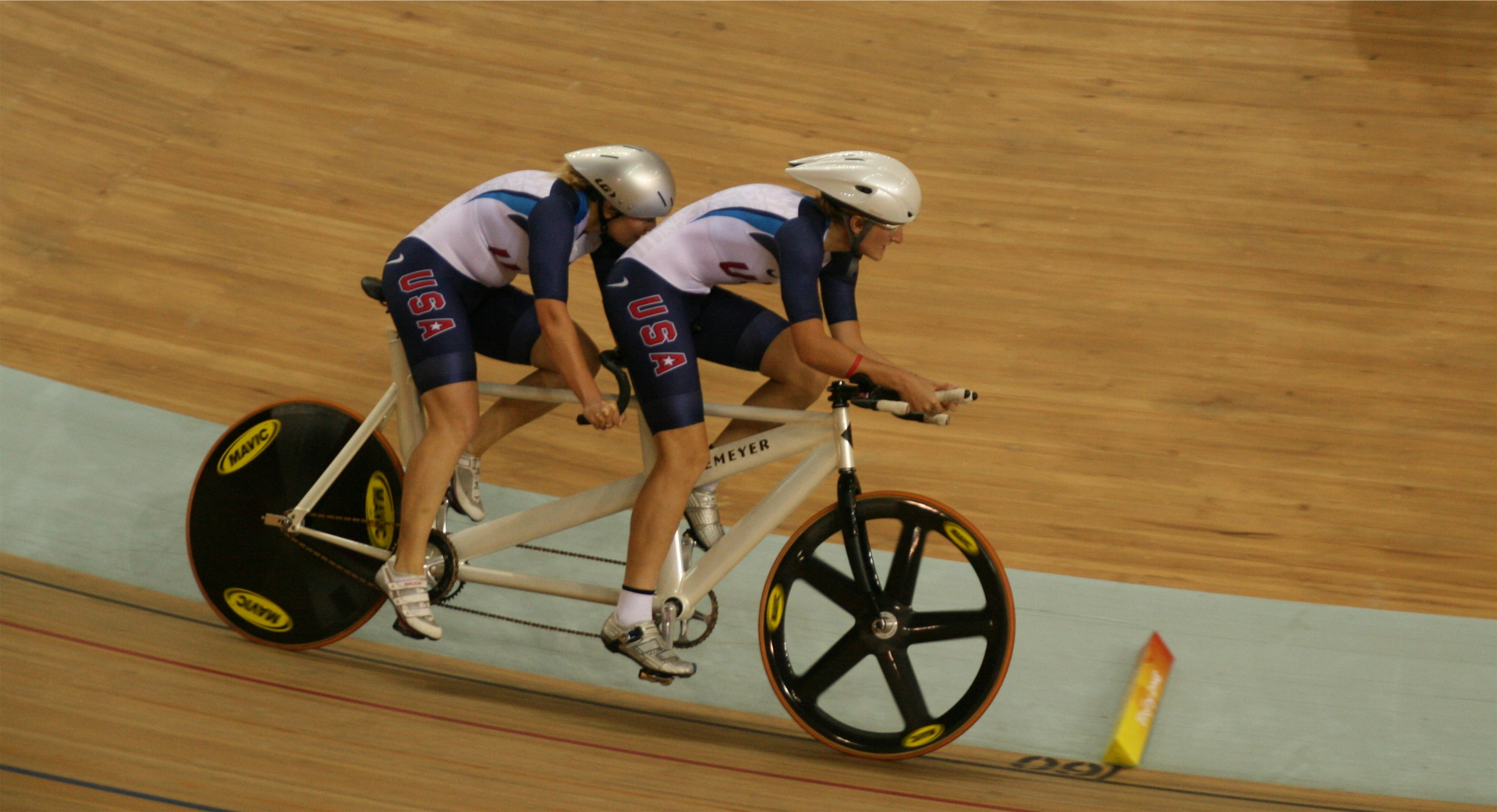
Karissa Whitsell and Mackenzie Woodring (pilot) compete in Beijing Summer Paralympics on September 07, 2008

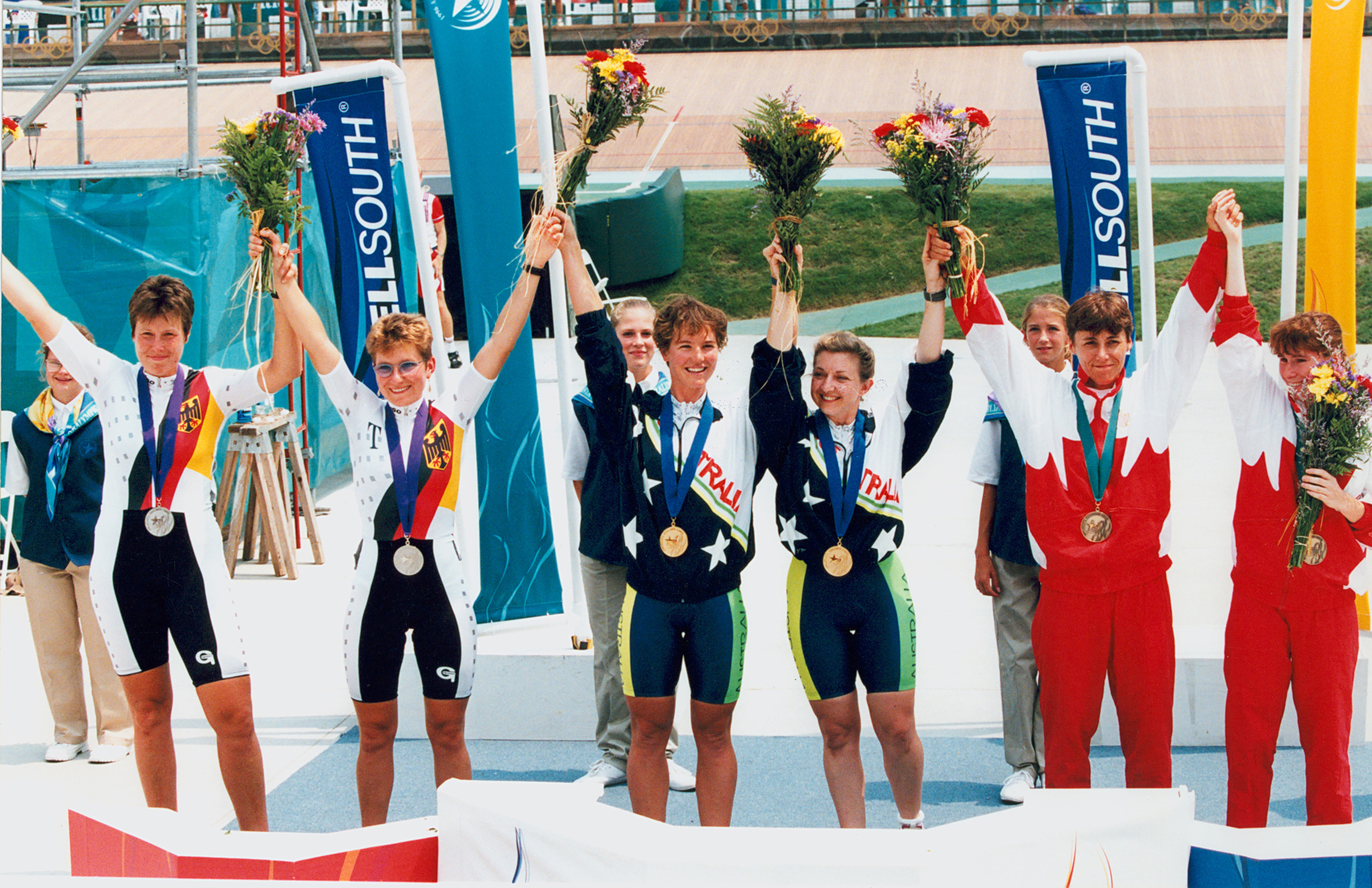
Tandem cyclists get their medals at the 1996 Summer Paralympics

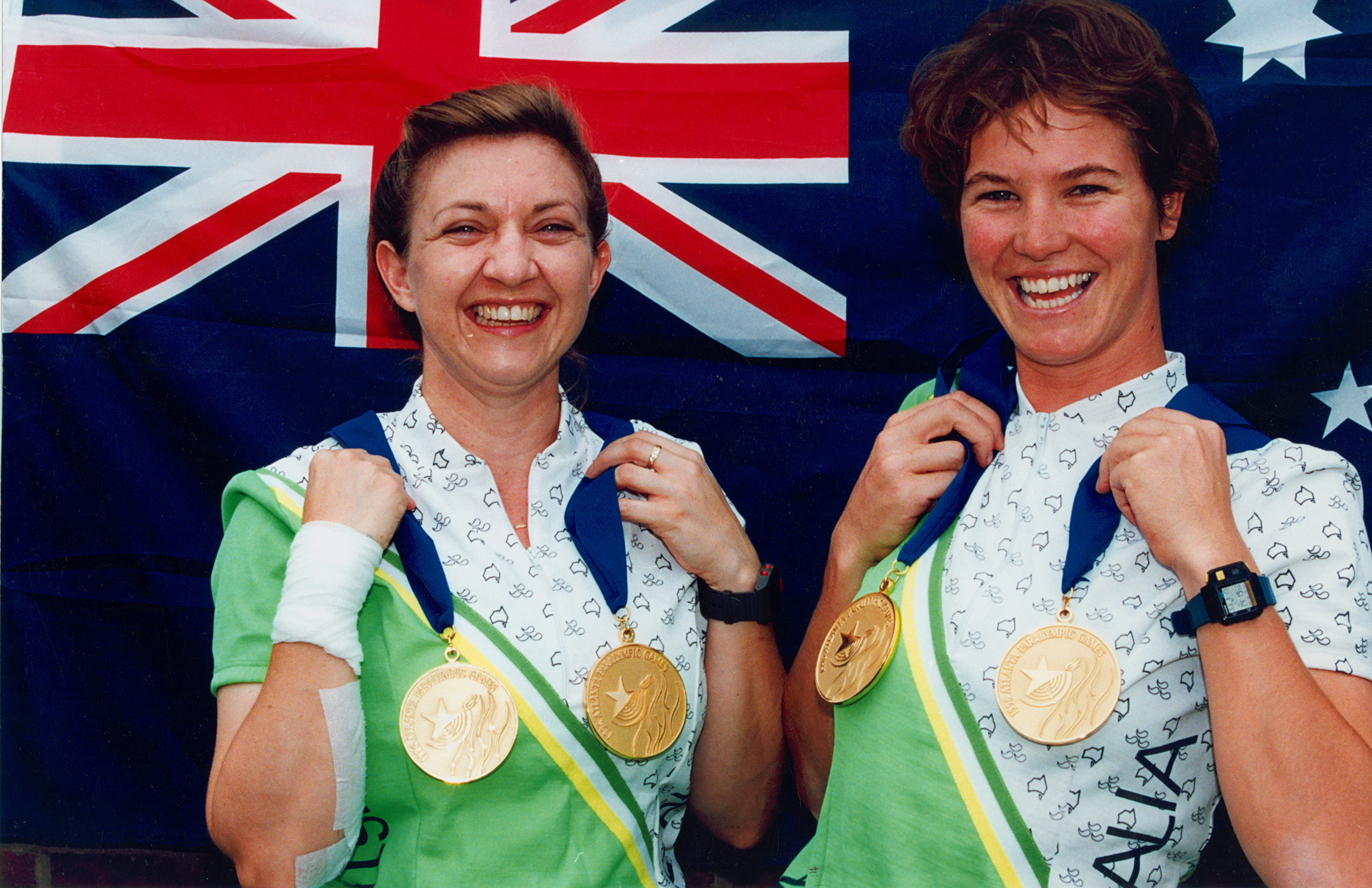
Australian tandem cyclists Terri Poole (right, vision impaired) and Sandra Smith (left, pilot for Terri) show off the gold medals they won in the 1km time trial and the 3km pursuit at the 1996 Atlanta Paralympic Games

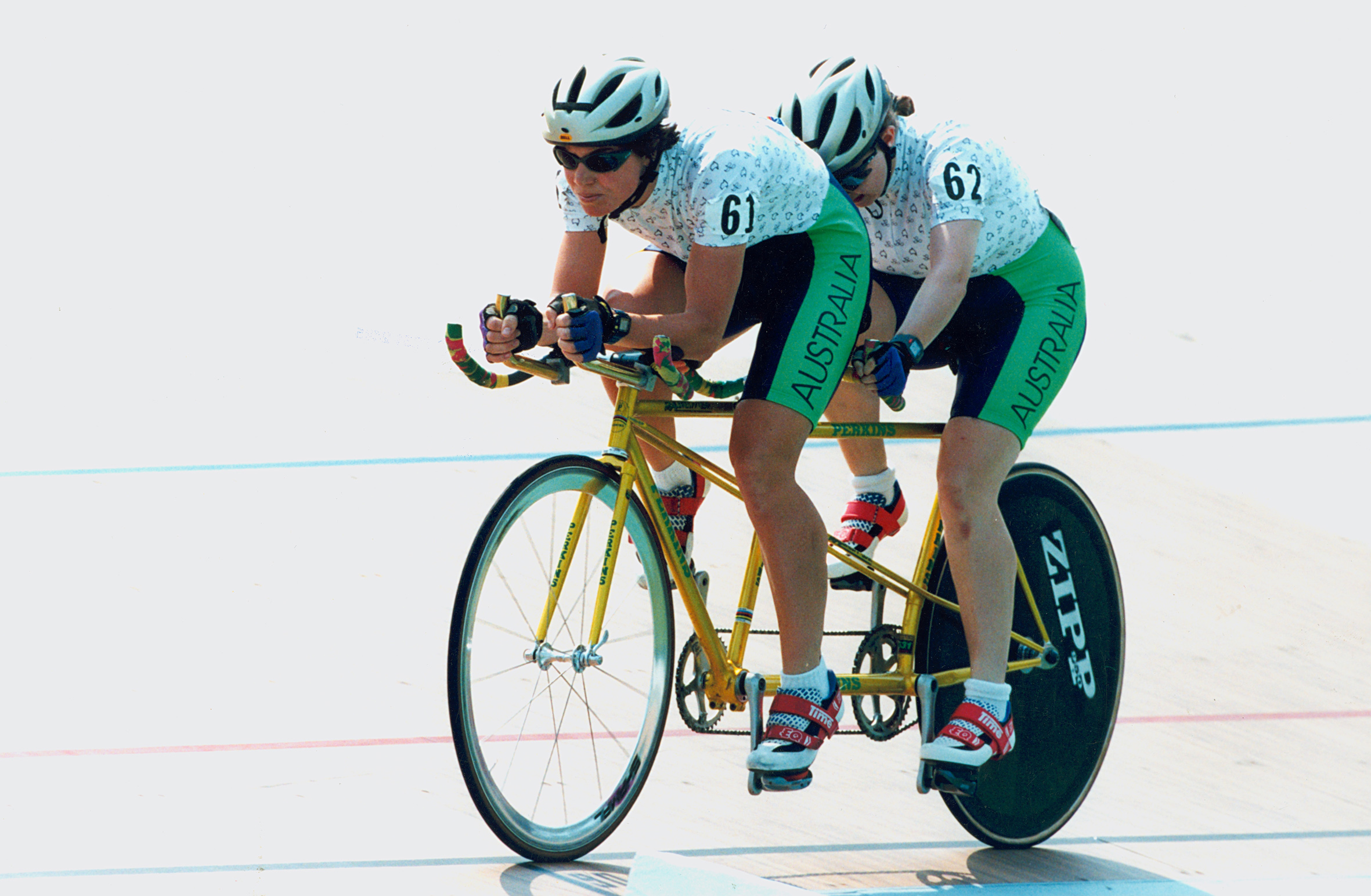
Australian cyclists Sandra Smith (pilot, on front) and Terri Poole (vision impaired, on back) race their tandem on their way to one of their two gold medals on the track at the 1996 Atlanta Paralympic Games

Tandem is a para-cycling classification for cyclists that require a sighted pilot for a non-sighted rider. The UCI recommends this be coded as MB. PBS defined this group as "Athletes who are blind or visually impaired compete with no classification system. They ride tandem with a sighted “pilot.”" The Telegraph defined this classification in 2011 as "B: Athletes who are blind and visually impaired" British Cycling defines this classification as: "Blind or Visual Impaired (VI), TCB - from no light perception in either eye up to visual acuity of 6/60 and/or visual field of less than 20 degrees. Classification assessed in the best eye with the best correction (i.e. all athletes who use contact or corrective lenses must wear them for classification, whether they intend to wear them in competition or not). Classification will be provided by a UCI accredited classifier"

== Classification history ==
Cycling first became a Paralympic sport at the 1988 Summer Paralympics.

In September 2006, governance for para-cycling passed from the International Paralympic Committee's International Cycling Committee to UCI at a meeting in Switzerland. When this happened, the responsibility of classifying the sport also changed.

== Becoming classified ==
Classification is handled by Union Cycliste Internationale. Classification for the UCI Para-Cycling World Championships is completed by at least two classification panels. Members of the classification panel must not have a relationship with the cyclist and must not be involved in the World Championships in any other role than as classifier. In national competitions, the classification is handled by the national cycling federation. Classification often has three components: physical, technical and observation assessment.

== Records ==
Below are some historical world records for this classification in the 200m men's Indoor track / Flying start.

Time	Cyclist	Country	Classification	Date and location	Country location	Reference
10"749	Kieran Modra	AUS	Blind Men	03.05.2003 DUNC GRAY, SYDNEY	AUS	
10"316	Neil Fachie	GBR	Blind Men	08.11.2009 MANCHESTER	GBR	
10"777	Vladimir Alexandr		Blind Men	08.09.1991 MOSCOW	RUS	
10"721	Anthony Kappes	GBR	Blind Men	13.05.2005 NCC MANCHESTER	GBR	
10"604	Anthony Kappes	GBR	Blind Men	05.10.2005 NCC MANCHESTER	GBR	
10"597	Anthony Kappes	GBR	Blind Men	05.05.2006 NCC MANCHESTER	GBR	
10"411	Anthony Kappes	GBR	Blind Men	06.10.2006 NCC MANCHESTER	GBR	
10"410	Anthony Kappes	GBR	Blind Men	11.05.2007 NCC MANCHESTER	GBR	
10"282	Neil Fachie	GBR	Blind Men	13.03.2011 MONTICHIARI	ITA	

== Rules ==
The sighted cyclist cannot be a professional cyclist in the past 12 months on any UCI pro tour with the exception of those over 40 years of age. The pair of cyclists must cycle in sync with each other.

== Rankings ==
This classification has UCI rankings for elite competitors.

== See also ==
- Para-cycling classification
- Cycling at the Summer Paralympics
