= C4 (classification) =

Para-cycling classification

C4 is a para-cycling classification. It includes people with lower limb impairments or issues with lower limb functionality. Disability groups covered by this classification include people with cerebral palsy, amputations and other lower limb impairments. The responsibility for this classification passed from the IPC to the UCI in September 2006.

== Definition ==
PBS defined this classification as "Cyclists with upper or lower limb impairments and low-level neurological impairment." The Telegraph defined this classification in 2011 as "C 1–5: Athletes with cerebral palsy, limb impairments and amputations." The UCI recommends this be coded as MC4 or WC4.

== Disability groups ==
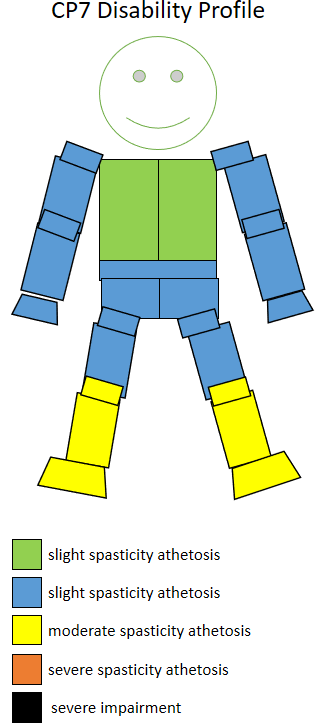
The spasticity athetosis level and location of a CP7 sportsperson.

One of the disability groups in this class is people with cerebral palsy from the CP7 and CP8 classes. CP7 sportspeople are able to walk, but appear to do so while having a limp as one side of their body is more affected than the other. They may have involuntary muscles spasms on one side of their body. They have fine motor control on their dominant side of the body, which can present as asymmetry when they are in motion. People in this class tend to have energy expenditure similar to people without cerebral palsy.

CP8 competitors must have cerebral palsy to such an extent that it impacts their sporting performance against able-bodied competitors to be eligible for this class. This is general manifested as spasticity in at least one limb. They are able to freely engage in a number of sport related motions including jumping. They also tend to have good balance and have minimal issues with coordination. People in this class tend to have energy expenditure similar to people without cerebral palsy.

== Classification history ==
Cycling first became a Paralympic sport at the 1988 Summer Paralympics. In September 2006, governance for para-cycling passed from the International Paralympic Committee's International Cycling Committee to UCI at a meeting in Switzerland. When this happened, the responsibility of classifying the sport also changed.

== Historical world records ==
Below are some historical world records for this classification in the 200m men's Indoor track / Flying start.

Time	Cyclist	Country	Classification	Date and location	Country location	Reference
10"998	Cundy Jody	GBR	C 4 Bicycle	22 May 2009, Manchester	GBR	
10"805	Cundy Jody	GBR	C 4 Bicycle	1 October 2011, Manchester	GBR	

== At the Paralympic Games ==
For the 2016 Summer Paralympics in Rio, the International Paralympic Committee had a zero classification at the Games policy. This policy was put into place in 2014, with the goal of avoiding last minute changes in classes that would negatively impact athlete training preparations. All competitors needed to be internationally classified with their classification status confirmed prior to the Games, with exceptions to this policy being dealt with on a case-by-case basis.

== Rankings ==
This classification has UCI rankings for elite competitors.

== Competitors ==
Competitors in this classification include Australia's Tyson Lawrence and Britain's Jody Cundy.

In 2016, Bahman Golbarnezhad died while competing.

== Becoming classified ==
Classification is handled by Union Cycliste Internationale. Classification for the UCI Para-Cycling World Championships is completed by at least two classification panels. Members of the classification panel must not have a relationship with the cyclist and must not be involved in the World Championships in any other role than as classifier. In national competitions, the classification is handled by the national cycling federation. Classification often has three components: physical, technical and observation assessment.

== See also ==
- Para-cycling classification
- Cycling at the Summer Paralympics
