= C1 (classification) =

Para-cycling classification

C1 is a para-cycling classification. Union Cycliste Internationale recommends this be coded as MC1 or WC1.

== Definition ==
PBS defined this classification as "Cyclists with upper or lower limb disabilities and most severe neurological disfunction." The Daily Telegraph defined this classification in 2011 as "C 1–5: Athletes with cerebral palsy, limb impairments and amputations."

== Classification history ==
Cycling first became a Paralympic sport at the 1988 Summer Paralympics.

In September 2006, governance for para-cycling passed from the International Paralympic Committee's International Cycling Committee to UCI at a meeting in Switzerland. When this happened, the responsibility of classifying the sport also changed.

== At the Paralympic Games ==
For the 2016 Summer Paralympics in Rio, the International Paralympic Committee had a zero classification at the Games policy. This policy was put into place in 2014, with the goal of avoiding last minute changes in classes that would negatively impact athlete training preparations. All competitors needed to be internationally classified with their classification status confirmed prior to the Games, with exceptions to this policy being dealt with on a case-by-case basis.

== Rankings ==
This classification has UCI rankings for elite competitors.

== Becoming classified ==
Classification is handled by Union Cycliste Internationale. Classification for the UCI Para-Cycling World Championships is completed by at least two classification panels. Members of the classification panel must not have a relationship with the cyclist and must not be involved in the World Championships in any other role than as classifier. In national competitions, the classification is handled by the national cycling federation. Classification often has three components: physical, technical and observation assessment.

== See also ==
- Para-cycling classification
- Cycling at the Summer Paralympics
