= UCI Para-cycling Track World Championships =

Tournament for track cyclists with physical disabilities

The UCI Para-cycling Track World Championships are the world championships for track cycling where athletes with a physical disability compete, organized by the Union Cycliste Internationale (UCI).

The Championships were earlier administered by the International Paralympic Committee.

The 1994, 1998, 2002 and 2007 IPC World Championships combined track and road events. The UCI and the IPC organized the 2006 IPC Cycling World Championships. The first UCI Para-cycling World Championships took place in 2007.

The UCI awards a gold medal and a rainbow jersey to the winner and silver and bronze medals to the second and third.

== Championships ==
Year	City	Country	Date	Velodrome	Events	Nations	Athletes	Ref
1994	Hasselt	Belgium	30 May - 5 June					
1998	Colorado Springs	United States	15–20 September					
2002	Augsburg	Germany	5–7 August					
2006	Aigle	Switzerland	11–13 September	World Cycling Centre				
2007	Bordeaux	France	19–27 August					
2009	Manchester	Great Britain	6–8 November	Manchester Velodrome	24	23	97+27	
2011	Montichiari	Italy	11–13 March	Montichiari Velodrome	22	27	190+47	
2012	Carson	United States	9–12 February	ADT Event Center		31	261+35	
2014	Aguascalientes	Mexico	10–13 April	Aguascalientes Bicentenary Velodrome		28	122+27	
2015	Apeldoorn	Netherlands	26–29 March	Omnisport Apeldoorn		30	153+37	
2016	Montichiari	Italy	17–20 March	Montichiari Velodrome	31	31	172+43	
2017	Los Angeles	United States	2–5 March	VELO Sports Center	29	20	74+19	
2018	Rio de Janeiro	Brazil	22–25 March	Rio Olympic Velodrome	31	28	155+37	
2019	Apeldoorn	Netherlands	14–17 March	Omnisport Apeldoorn	37	36	192+43	
2020	Milton	Canada	30 January – 2 February	Mattamy National Cycling Centre	40	31	159+40	
2022	Montigny-le-Bretonneux	France	20–23 October	Vélodrome National	48	38	174+37	
2023	Glasgow	Great Britain	2–7 August	Sir Chris Hoy Velodrome	48			
2024	Rio de Janeiro	Brazil	20–24 March	Rio Olympic Velodrome	48	39	203+46	
2025	Rio de Janeiro	Brazil	16–19 October	Rio Olympic Velodrome	48	36	143+31	
2026	Apeldoorn	Netherlands	29 October – 1 November	Omnisport Apeldoorn				

== All-time medal table (since 2006) ==
Updated after the 2026 UCI Para-cycling Track World Championships.

=== Total ===
Rank	NPC	Gold	Silver	Bronze	Total
1	Great Britain (GBR)	173	100	49	322
2	Australia (AUS)	99	77	65	241
3	China (CHN)	78	52	38	168
4	France (FRA)	41	18	21	80
5	Netherlands (NED)	31	34	31	96
6	United States (USA)	30	41	59	130
7	Spain (ESP)	29	37	43	109
8	New Zealand (NZL)	19	28	30	77
9	Germany (GER)	15	28	30	73
10	Canada (CAN)	13	24	19	56
11	Slovakia (SVK)	12	10	1	23
12	Switzerland (SUI)	11	7	7	25
13	Italy (ITA)	9	11	13	33
14	Belgium (BEL)	5	11	19	35
15	Czech Republic (CZE)	5	8	12	25
16	Japan (JPN)	4	20	12	36
17	Colombia (COL)	4	7	17	28
18	Poland (POL)	4	6	9	19
19	Argentina (ARG)	4	1	11	16
20	Brazil (BRA)	3	15	12	30
21	Ireland (IRL)	3	9	14	26
22	Russia (RUS)	3	7	15	25
23	Ukraine (UKR)	3	5	5	13
24	Austria (AUT)	2	9	8	19
25	Romania (ROU)	1	5	5	11
26	Malaysia (MAS)	1	3	10	14
27	South Africa (RSA)	0	3	3	6
28	Individual Neutral Athletes (AIN)	0	2	2	4
29	Denmark (DEN)	0	1	0	1
30	Greece (GRE)	0	0	1	1
30	Sweden (SWE)	0	0	1	1
Totals (31 entries)		602	579	562	1,743

== See also ==
- Cycling at the Summer Paralympics
- UCI Para-cycling Road World Championships
- UCI Track Cycling World Championships
- UCI World Championships
