= Cycling at the 2024 Summer Paralympics – Track cycling =

Track Cycling at the XVII Paralympic Games
- Venue: Vélodrome de Saint-Quentin-en-Yvelines
- Dates: 29 August to 1 September (track)
- Competitors: 220

Track Cycling at the 2024 Summer Paralympics in Paris, France, took place at the Vélodrome de Saint-Quentin-en-Yvelines from 29 August to 1 September.

Events were held on tandem bicycles for visually impaired cyclists (B), and standard bicycles (C1-5). There were no track races for handbikes or tricycles, as these machines are unsuitable for the banked velodrome track. Seventeen events were held in total on the track, a third of the total cycling events at the Games. The short time trial (either 500 metres or 1000 metres ('kilo') and individual pursuit disciplines (over 3000 or 400 metres) were contested, along with one mixed classification team sprint event over 750 metres. There were no mass start races (e.g. scratch race, points race or omnium) in the program.

A number of the events were composite classification events for multiple classes to ensure viable numbers of entrants. Such events were subject to factoring, whereby finishing times are adjusted by a standardised percentage based on individual classification, to allow fair competition between classes.

The overall race programme was unchanged from 2021 in Tokyo.

== Qualification ==
The qualification period for track cycling started from 1 January 2022 to 30 June 2024. In order to maintain their slots, NPCs must have at least one cyclist for each allocated slot to participate in at least one of the listed cycling competitions below.

Means of qualification	Date	Venue
2023 UCI Para-cycling Track World Championships	2–8 August 2023	(United Kingdom) Glasgow
2024 UCI Para-cycling Track World Championships	20–24 March 2024	(Brazil) Rio de Janeiro

== Medal table ==
The following is the final medal table for all track cycling events at the 2024 Summer Paralympics. The table was topped, once again, by Great Britain, thanks to a dominant final day in the velodrome which included 3 gold medals, a silver and a bronze.

* Host nation (France)

Rank	NPC	Gold	Silver	Bronze	Total
1	Great Britain	5	6	3	14
2	China	3	3	0	6
3	France*	3	2	2	7
4	Australia	3	1	1	5
5	Netherlands	2	0	0	2
6	Slovakia	1	0	0	1
7	Spain	0	1	2	3
8	New Zealand	0	1	1	2
9	Belgium	0	1	0	1
9	Ireland	0	1	0	1
9	Ukraine	0	1	0	1
12	Canada	0	0	3	3
13	Germany	0	0	2	2
14	Italy	0	0	1	1
14	Switzerland	0	0	1	1
14	United States	0	0	1	1
Totals (16 entries)		17	17	17	51

== Medalists ==
=== Men's events ===
Event	Class	Gold	Silver	Bronze
Time trial	B	Great Britain; James Ball pilot: Steffan Lloyd	Great Britain; Neil Fachie pilot: Matt Rotherham	Germany; Thomas Ulbricht pilot: Robert Förstemann
Time trial	C1–2–3	Li Zhangyu; China	Liang Weicong; China	Alexandre Léauté; France
Time trial	C4–5	Korey Boddington; Australia	Blaine Hunt; Great Britain	Alfonso Cabello; Spain
Pursuit	B	Tristan Bangma; Pilot: Patrick Bos; Netherlands	Stephen Bate; Pilot: Chris Latham; Great Britain	Lorenzo Bernard; Pilot: Davide Plebani; Italy
Pursuit	C1	Li Zhangyu; China	Liang Weicong; China	Ricardo Ten Argilés; Spain
Pursuit	C2	Alexandre Léauté; France	Ewoud Vromant; Belgium	Matthew Robertson; Great Britain
Pursuit	C3	Jaco van Gass; Great Britain	Finlay Graham; Great Britain	Alexandre Hayward; Canada
Pursuit	C4	Jozef Metelka; Slovakia	Archie Atkinson; Great Britain	Gatien Le Rousseau; France
Pursuit	C5	Dorian Foulon; France	Yehor Dementyev; Ukraine	Elouan Gardon; United States

=== Women's events ===
Event	Class	Gold	Silver	Bronze
Time trial	B	Great Britain; Elizabeth Jordan pilot: Dannielle Khan	Australia; Jessica Gallagher pilot: Caitlin Ward	Great Britain; Sophie Unwin pilot: Jenny Holl
Time trial	C1–2–3	Amanda Reid; Australia	Qian Wangwei; China	Maike Hausberger; Germany
Time trial	C4–5	Caroline Groot; Netherlands	Marie Patouillet; France	Kate O'Brien; Canada
Pursuit	B	Great Britain; Sophie Unwin pilot: Jenny Holl	Ireland; Katie-George Dunlevy pilot: Eve McCrystal	Great Britain; Lora Fachie pilot: Corrine Hall
Pursuit	C1–2–3	Wang Xiaomei; China	Daphne Schrager; Great Britain	Flurina Rigling; Switzerland
Pursuit	C4	Emily Petricola; Australia	Anna Taylor; New Zealand	Keely Shaw; Canada
Pursuit	C5	Marie Patouillet; France	Heïdi Gaugain; France	Nicole Murray; New Zealand

=== Mixed event ===
Event	Class	Gold	Silver	Bronze
Team sprint	C1–5	Great Britain; Kadeena Cox; Jaco van Gass; Jody Cundy	Spain; Ricardo Ten Argiles; Pablo Jaramillo Gallardo; Alfonso Cabello Llamas	Australia; Gordon Allan; Alistair Donohoe; Korey Boddington

== See also ==
- Cycling at the 2024 Summer Olympics
