= Cycling at the 2020 Summer Paralympics – Women's individual pursuit =

The women's individual pursuit track cycling events at the 2020 Summer Paralympics will take place between August 25 to 28 2021 at the Izu Velodrome, Japan. Four events will take place in the women's event also over six classifications. One of those four events spanned multiple classifications were 'factored' events, with final times adjusted in line with classification to ensure fairness. The distances of all events are 3000m.

== Classification ==
Cyclists are given a classification depending on the type and extent of their disability. The classification system allows cyclists to compete against others with a similar level of function. The class number indicates the severity of impairment with "1" being most impaired.

Cycling classes are:

- B: Blind and visually impaired cyclists use a Tandem bicycle with a sighted pilot on the front
- C 1-5: Cyclists with an impairment that affects their legs, arms, and/or trunk but are capable of using a standard bicycle

== Schedule ==
Q	Qualifying	F	Finals

Women's individual pursuit
Event↓/Date →	August 25		August 26	August 27	August 28	
B					Q	F
C1-3	Q	F				
C4	Q	F				
C5	Q	F				

== Medal table ==
Rank	NPC	Gold	Silver	Bronze	Total
1	Great Britain	2	1	1	4
2	Australia	2	0	0	2
3	China	0	1	0	1
3	Ireland	0	1	0	1
3	United States	0	1	0	1
6	Canada	0	0	1	1
6	France	0	0	1	1
6	Germany	0	0	1	1
Totals (8 entries)		4	4	4	12

== Medal summary ==
Classification	Gold		Silver		Bronze	
B	Great Britain; Lora Fachie piloted by Corrine Hall	3:19.560	Ireland; Katie-George Dunlevy piloted by Eve McCrystal	3:21.505	Great Britain; Sophie Unwin piloted by Jenny Holl	3:23.446
C1-3	Paige Greco; Australia	3:50.815 WR	Wang Xiaomei; China	3:54.975	Denise Schindler; Germany	3:55.120
C4	Emily Petricola; Australia		Shawn Morelli; United States	OVL	Keely Shaw; Canada	3:48.342
C5	Sarah Storey; Great Britain		Crystal Lane-Wright; Great Britain	OVL	Marie Patouillet; France	3:39.233
