= Cycling at the 2020 Summer Paralympics – Women's time trial B =

Women's individual pursuit B at the XVI Paralympic Games
- Venue: Izu Velodrome
- Dates: 26 August 2021
- Competitors: 10 from 7 nations
- Winning time: 1:05.291

Medalists
1st place, gold medalist(s)		Larissa Klaassen piloted by Imke Brommer	Netherlands
2nd place, silver medalist(s)		Aileen McGlynn piloted by Helen Scott	Great Britain
3rd place, bronze medalist(s)		Griet Hoet piloted by Anneleen Monsieur	Belgium

The women's time trial class B track cycling event at the 2020 Summer Paralympics took place on 26 August 2021 in the Izu Velodrome, Japan. This class is for the cyclist who are blind or has visual impairments, they will then ride with tandem bicycles together with a sighted cyclist (also known as the pilot). There were 10 pairs from seven different nations competing.

== Competition format ==
The 10 pairs were divided into their own heats (1 heat including 1 pair). They did a time trial basis where the fastest pair would win gold, second fastest a silver, and third fastest a bronze. The distance of this event was 1000m.

== Schedule ==
All times are Japan Standard Time (UTC+9)

Date	Time	Round
Thursday, 26 August	10:00	Finals

== Records ==
World Record	Sophie Thornhill (pilot: Helen Scott) (GBR)	1:04.623	Brisbane, Australia	7 April 2018
Paralympic Record	Sophie Thornhill (pilot: Helen Scott) (GBR)	1:06.283	Rio de Janeiro, Brazil	9 September 2016

== Results ==
Rank	Heat	Nation	Cyclists	Result	Notes
1st place, gold medalist(s)	10	Netherlands	Larissa Klaassen piloted by Imke Brommer	1:05.291	PR
2nd place, silver medalist(s)	2	Great Britain	Aileen McGlynn piloted by Helen Scott	1:06.743	
3rd place, bronze medalist(s)	9	Belgium	Griet Hoet piloted by Anneleen Monsieur	1:07.943	
4	7	Great Britain	Lora Fachie piloted by Corrine Hall	1:08.232	
5	5	Great Britain	Sophie Unwin piloted by Jenny Holl	1:08.701	
6	8	Ireland	Katie-George Dunlevy piloted by Eve McCrystal	1:09.044	
7	6	Poland	Justyna Kiryła piloted by Aleksandra Tecław	1:12.354	
8	1	Poland	Dominika Putyra piloted by Ewa Bańkowska	1:13.212	
9	3	Malaysia	Nur Azlia Syafinaz piloted by Nurul Suhada Zainal	1:15.005	
10	4	Sweden	Louise Jannering piloted by Jenny Eliasson	1:19.965	
