= Cycling at the 2024 Summer Paralympics – Women's pursuit =

The women's individual pursuit track cycling events at the 2024 Summer Paralympics will take place between August 29 to 1 September 2024 at the Vélodrome National, Paris. Four events will take place in the women's event also over six classifications. One of those four events spanned multiple classifications were 'factored' events, with final times adjusted in line with classification to ensure fairness. The distances of all events are 3000m.

== Classification ==
Cyclists are given a classification depending on the type and extent of their disability. The classification system allows cyclists to compete against others with a similar level of function. The class number indicates the severity of impairment with "1" being most impaired.

Cycling classes are:

- B: Blind and visually impaired cyclists use a Tandem bicycle with a sighted pilot on the front
- C 1-5: Cyclists with an impairment that affects their legs, arms, and/or trunk but are capable of using a standard bicycle

== Medal table ==
* Host nation (France)

Rank	NPC	Gold	Silver	Bronze	Total
1	Great Britain	1	1	1	3
2	France*	1	1	0	2
3	Australia	1	0	0	1
3	China	1	0	0	1
5	New Zealand	0	1	1	2
6	Ireland	0	1	0	1
7	Canada	0	0	1	1
7	Switzerland	0	0	1	1
Totals (8 entries)		4	4	4	12

== Medal summary ==
Classification	Gold		Silver		Bronze	
B	Sophie Unwin piloted by Jenny Holl; Great Britain	3:19.149	Katie-George Dunlevy piloted by Eve McCrystal; Ireland	3:21.315	Lora Fachie piloted by Corrine Hall; Great Britain	3:20.488 ^{b.f.}
C1-3	Wang Xiaomei; China	3:41.692 WR	Daphne Schrager; Great Britain	3:51.129	Flurina Rigling; Switzerland	3:48.512 ^{b.f.}
C4	Emily Petricola; Australia		Anna Taylor; New Zealand	OVL	Keely Shaw; Canada	3:46.942 ^{b.f.}
C5	Marie Patouillet; France	3:35.691	Heïdi Gaugain; France	3:37.723	Nicole Murray; New Zealand	3:36.206 ^{b.f.}
