= Cycling at the 2020 Summer Paralympics – Women's road time trial B =

Women's road time trial B at the XVI Paralympic Games
- Venue: Fuji Speedway
- Dates: 31 August
- Competitors: 8 from 6 nations
- Winning time: 47:32.07

Medalists
1st place, gold medalist(s)		Katie-George Dunlevy; Guide: Eve McCrystal	Ireland
2nd place, silver medalist(s)		Lora Fachie; Guide: Corrine Hall	Great Britain
3rd place, bronze medalist(s)		Louise Jannering; Guide: Anna Svärdström	Sweden

The women's time trial B road cycling event at the 2020 Summer Paralympics took place on 31 August 2021, at Flamengo Park, Pontal. 8 riders (and pilots) competed in the event.

The B classification is for cyclists with visual impairment. Sighted guides act as pilots in these events, which take place on tandem bikes.

== Results ==
The event took place on 31 August 2021, at 14:43:

Rank	Rider Guide	Nationality	Time	Deficit
1st place, gold medalist(s)	Katie-George Dunlevy; Guide: Eve McCrystal	Ireland	47:32.07	
2nd place, silver medalist(s)	Lora Fachie; Guide: Corrine Hall	Great Britain	48:32.06	+59.99
3rd place, bronze medalist(s)	Louise Jannering; Guide: Anna Svärdström	Sweden	49:36.06	+2:03.99
4	Dominiką Putyrą; Guide: Ewa Bańkowska	Poland	49:45.17	+2:13.10
5	Sophie Unwin; Guide: Jenny Holl	Great Britain	49:59.85	+2:27.78
6	Justyna Kiryła; Guide: Aleksandra Tecław	Poland	51:09.21	+3:37.14
7	Griet Hoet; Guide: Anneleen Monsieur	Belgium	52:07.58	+4:35.51
8	Nur Azlia Syafinaz; Guide: Nurul Suhada Zainal	Malaysia	DNF	
