= RTÉ Sports Team of the Year Award =

Irish sports award

- Awarded for: Most substantive contribution to sport
- Country: Ireland
- Presented by: RTÉ Sport
- First award: 2004; 22 years ago
- Most recent winner: Katie-George Dunlevy and Linda Kelly (2024; para cycling)
- Website: Official website

The RTÉ Sports Team of the Year Award is given on an annual basis to the sporting team or partnership considered to have made the most substantive contribution to sport in that year. It was first awarded, by RTÉ Sport, in 2004.

== List of winners ==
Year	Winner	Sport	Achievement
2004	Ireland Rugby Union	Rugby Union	Winners of the Triple Crown in the 2004 Six Nations Championship
2005	Tyrone Gaelic Football	Gaelic Football	Winners of the 2005 All-Ireland Senior Football Championship Final
2006	Munster Rugby	Rugby Union	Winners of the 2005–06 Heineken Cup
2007	Ireland Cricket	Cricket	Qualified for the Super 8 stages in their first ever World Cup
2008	Munster Rugby	Rugby Union	Winners of the Heineken Cup for the second time in three years
2009	Ireland Rugby Union	Rugby Union	Winners of the Six Nations Grand Slam for first time in sixty-one years
2010	Irish Amateur Boxing Team	Boxing	Winners of 5 medals at the 2010 European Amateur Boxing Championships
2011	Leinster Rugby	Rugby Union	2008-09 & 2010-11 Heineken Cup Champions - Heineken Cup for the second time in three years
2012	Donegal Gaelic Football	Gaelic Football	Blew every opponent away using "The System" on their way to Championship glory
2013	Clare Hurling	Hurling	Emerged to win the 2013 All-Ireland after only winning one championship match over the previous four campaigns.
2014	Cork Ladies' Football	Ladies' Gaelic Football	Won their 9th All-Ireland title in 10 years.
2015	Dundalk F.C.	Association football	Won the double of League of Ireland and FAI Cup
2016	Gary O'Donovan and Paul O'Donovan	Rowing	Won the silver medal in the Men's lightweight double sculls at the 2016 Summer Olympics
2017	Irish show jumping team	Show jumping	
2018	Ireland women's national field hockey team	Field hockey	Runners-up at the 2018 Women's Hockey World Cup
2019	Dublin Gaelic football team	Gaelic football	Record-breaking five successive All-Ireland Championships
2020	Limerick hurling team	Hurling	Winners of the 2020 Munster Senior Hurling Championship, the 2020 All-Ireland Senior Hurling Championship and the 2020 National Hurling League
2021	Katie-George Dunlevy and Eve McCrystal	Cycling	Won the silver medal in the Women's individual pursuit at the 2020 Summer Paralympics
2022	Paul O'Donovan and Fintan McCarthy	Rowing	Won the gold medal in the 2022 World Rowing Championships Men's lightweight double sculls
2023	Limerick hurling team	Hurling	Winners of the 2023 Munster Senior Hurling Championship, the 2023 All-Ireland Senior Hurling Championship and the 2023 National Hurling League
2024	Katie-George Dunlevy and Linda Kelly	Cycling	Won Paralympics Gold in the Time Trial and Silver in the Road Race and Two Gold medal at the World Championships

== Shortlists ==
The winner is in bold.

=== 2010 ===
- **Ireland amateur boxing team**
- Cork senior football team
- Republic of Ireland U-17 women's football team
- Dublin senior ladies' football team
- Shamrock Rovers
- Tipperary senior hurling team
- Ireland U-23 cross country team
- Wexford senior camogie team

=== 2011 ===
- **Leinster Rugby**
- Dublin senior football team
- Cork women's Gaelic football team
- Republic of Ireland national football team
- Shamrock Rovers
- Kilkenny senior hurling team
- Wexford senior camogie team
- Ireland cricket team

=== 2012 ===
- **Donegal senior football team**
- Leinster Rugby
- Cork senior ladies' football team
- Ireland at the 2012 Summer Paralympics
- Sligo Rovers
- Kilkenny senior hurling team
- Wexford senior camogie team
- Irish amateur boxing team
- Irish women's cross country team

=== 2014 ===
- **Cork senior ladies' football team**
- Cork senior camogie team
- Dundalk F.C.
- Ireland national rugby union team
- Kerry Senior Football
- Kilkenny Senior Hurling

=== 2015 ===
- Dublin footballers,
- Kilkenny hurlers,
- Cork camogie,
- Cork ladies football,
- **Dundalk F.C.**
- Ireland women's cricket team,
- Ireland men's rugby team,
- Ireland men's hockey team,
- Irish boxing team,
- Northern Ireland soccer team,
- Republic of Ireland soccer team
- Special Olympics team

=== 2016 ===
- Connacht Rugby
- Cork ladies' footballers
- Dublin footballers
- Dundalk F.C.
- Ireland's Paralympic cycling
- Ireland's Paralympic athletics
- Ireland rugby
- Kilkenny camogie
- Northern Ireland soccer
- **Gary O'Donovan and Paul O'Donovan**
- Republic of Ireland soccer
- Tipperary hurlers

=== 2020 ===
- Dublin Gaelic footballers
- Dublin ladies footballers
- Kilkenny camogie team
- Leinster rugby
- **Limerick hurling team**
- Shamrock Rovers

=== 2021 ===
- Galway camogie team
- **Katie-George Dunlevy and Eve McCrystal**
- Leinster rugby
- Limerick hurling team
- Meath ladies footballers
- Paul O'Donovan and Fintan McCarthy
- Shamrock Rovers
- Tyrone Gaelic footballers
- Aifric Keogh, Eimear Lambe, Fiona Murtagh and Emily Hegarty

=== 2022 ===
- **Paul O'Donovan and Fintan McCarthy**
- Irish Women's European Boxing Team
- Kerry Gaelic footballers
- Kilkenny Camogie
- Meath ladies footballers
- Limerick hurling team
- Republic of Ireland national football team
- Shamrock Rovers
- Katie-George Dunlevy and Eve McCrystal

=== 2023 ===
- Cork Camogie
- Dublin Gaelic footballers
- Dublin ladies footballers
- Paul O'Donovan and Fintan McCarthy
- Ireland national rugby union team
- **Limerick hurling team**
- Munster Rugby
- Katie-George Dunlevy and Linda Kelly
- Shamrock Rovers

=== 2024 ===
- Clare Hurling
- Armagh Gaelic footballers
- Kerry ladies footballers
- Cork Camogie
- Shelbourne
- Paul O'Donovan and Fintan McCarthy
- Ireland national rugby union team
- **Katie-George Dunlevy and Linda Kelly**
- Rhasidat Adeleke, Sharlene Mawdsley, Thomas Barr & Christopher O'Donnell

== See also ==
- RTÉ Sports Person of the Year
