= Cycling at the 2020 Summer Paralympics =

Cycling at the XVI Paralympic Games
- Pictograms for road (left) and track (right) cycling
- Venue: Izu Velodrome (track cycling); Fuji Speedway (road cycling)
- Dates: 25 August – 3 September 2021
- Competitors: 230 in 51 events from 44 nations

Cycling at the 2020 Summer Paralympics took place in two separate locations. Track cycling took place at the Izu Velodrome from 25 to 28 August 2021 and road cycling took place on the Fuji Speedway from 31 August to 3 September 2021.

The 2020 Summer Olympic and Paralympic Games were postponed to 2021 due to the COVID-19 pandemic. They kept the 2020 name and were held from 24 August to 5 September 2021.

The competition was dominated by the squads from Great Britain and The Netherlands, winning 19 gold medals from 51 events. Great Britain, as in 2008, 2012 and 2016 dominated the track events, while the Netherlands were particularly strong in road racing.

Among the highlights were Great Britain's Sarah Storey becoming her country's most successful ever Paralympian, echoing the achievement of Jason Kenny in the 2020 Summer Olympics, winning her 15th, 16th and 17th gold medals in her eighth Paralympic Games.

== Classification ==
Cyclists are given a classification depending on the type and extent of their disability. This method is known as a functional system and was introduced in 2012. Athletes are classified according to their functional ability across four broad categories (blind or partially sighted tandem, handcycle, tricycle and standard bicycle). The class number indicates the severity of impairment with "1" being most impaired. The classification system allows cyclists to compete against others with a similar level of function.

Riders with recovering or deteriorating conditions such as MS are eligible but must have been reclassified within six months of a World Championships or Paralympic Games to ensure their classification is correct. Specialised equipment including prostheses is only allowed where it has been specifically approved.

B – tandem bicycle

This class is for athletes who have visual impairments and therefore ride tandem bicycles with a sighted cyclist (known as a pilot). B1, B2, and B3 athletes compete together in this class.

H (1-5) – handcycle

This class is for athletes who are lower limb amputees, have paraplegia, or have involuntary or uncoordinated movement, and ride a handcycle using arms to turn pedals for propulsion. H1–4 cyclists compete in the reclined position, whereas H5 cyclists compete in a kneeling position.

T (1-2) – tricycle

This class of athletes compete using a tricycle instead of a bicycle, due to lack of balance, or a restriction in the ability to pedal due to muscle tension, or uncoordinated or involuntary movements. tension, uncoordinated movements or involuntary movements.

C (1-5) – standard bicycle

This class is for athletes with a limb deficiency, impaired muscle power or range of motion, and impairments affecting co-ordination, such as uncoordinated and involuntary movements.

=== Factored events ===
Some cycling events are factored. This can happen when cyclists from different classes compete against each other and means that the results take into account the severity of the impairments of each competitor. As a result, some riders within an event will have their times ‘factored’ while other riders will not, or will have their time factored in a different calculation. The gold medal goes to the athlete with the fastest time after all the required times have been calculated. It is therefore possible for an athlete to break a paralympic or world record in their event for their specific classification, but to finish behind a differently classified athlete in that event after factoring. In such a case, the record is still treated as an official World, or as the case may be, Paralympic Games record within their classification for that event.

== Participating nations ==
As of June 2021

- Argentina (3)
- Australia (12)
- Austria (6)
- Belgium (8)
- Brazil (5)
- Canada (8)
- China (8)
- Colombia (6)
- Costa Rica (1)
- Cuba (1)
- Czech Republic (5)
- Denmark (1)
- Finland (2)
- France (10)
- Germany (12)
- Great Britain (20)
- Greece (2)
- Guyana (1)
- Hungary (2)
- Indonesia (1)
- Iran (1)
- Ireland (5)
- Italy (11)
- Japan (4) (Host nation)
- Malaysia (5)
- Netherlands (10)
- New Zealand (6)
- Peru (1)
- Poland (7)
- Portugal (2)
- Romania (2)
- RPC (8)
- Serbia (1)
- Singapore (1)
- Slovakia (5)
- Slovenia (1)
- South Africa (3)
- South Korea (3)
- Spain (10)
- Sweden (4)
- Switzerland (5)
- Thailand (1)
- Ukraine (2)
- United States (14)
- Venezuela (1)

== Medal table ==
* Host nation (Japan)

Rank	NPC	Gold	Silver	Bronze	Total
1	Great Britain	10	11	3	24
2	Netherlands	9	3	4	16
3	France	5	4	8	17
4	Australia	4	4	5	13
5	Germany	3	4	5	12
6	China	3	4	3	10
7	United States	3	2	3	8
8	RPC	3	0	0	3
9	Ireland	2	1	1	4
9	Slovakia	2	1	1	4
11	Spain	2	0	4	6
12	Japan*	2	0	0	2
13	Italy	1	5	1	7
14	Austria	1	2	3	6
15	South Africa	1	0	0	1
16	Belgium	0	2	3	5
17	Sweden	0	2	2	4
18	Canada	0	2	1	3
18	Ukraine	0	2	1	3
20	Romania	0	1	0	1
20	Switzerland	0	1	0	1
22	Colombia	0	0	2	2
23	Poland	0	0	1	1
Totals (23 entries)		51	51	51	153

== Medalists ==
=== Road cycling ===
==== Men's events ====
Event	Class	Gold		Silver		Bronze	
Time trial	B	France; Alexandre Lloveras pilot: Corentin Ermenault	41:54.02	Netherlands; Vincent ter Schure pilot: Timo Fransen	42:00.77	Spain; Christian Venge Balboa pilot: Noel Martín Infante	42:52.12
Time trial	H1	Pieter du Preez; South Africa	43:49.41	Fabrizio Cornegliani; Italy	45:44.56	Maxime Hordies; Belgium	47:01.23
Time trial	H2	Sergio Garrote Muñoz; Spain	31:23.53	Luca Mazzone; Italy	31:23.79	Florian Jouanny; France	32:41.62
Time trial	H3	Walter Ablinger; Austria	43:39.17	Vico Merklein; Germany	43:41.06	Luis Miguel García-Marquina; Spain	43:48.68
Time trial	H4	Jetze Plat; Netherlands	37:28.92	Thomas Fruehwirth; Austria	38:30.61	Alexander Gritsch; Austria	39:58.93
Time trial	H5	Mitch Valize; Netherlands	38:12.94	Loïc Vergnaud; France	39:15.16	Gary O'Reilly; Ireland	39:36.46
Time trial	C1	Mikhail Astashov; RPC	24:53.37	Aaron Keith; United States	24:55.40	Michael Teuber; Germany	24:58.67
Time trial	C2	Darren Hicks; Australia	34:39.78	Ewoud Vromant; Belgium	36:11.79	Alexandre Léauté; France	37:07.16
Time trial	C3	Benjamin Watson; Great Britain	35:00.82	Steffen Warias; Germany	35:57.41	Matthias Schindler; Germany	36:17.95
Time trial	C4	Patrik Kuril; Slovakia	45:47.10	Jozef Metelka; Slovakia	46:05.05	George Peasgood; Great Britain	46:08.93
Time trial	C5	Daniel Abraham Gebru; Netherlands	42:46.45	Yegor Dementyev; Ukraine	43:19.11	Alistair Donohoe; Australia	43:36.80
Time trial	T1–2	Chen Jianxin; China	25:00.32	Giorgio Farroni; Italy	27:49.78	Tim Celen; Belgium	30:44.21
Road race	B	Netherlands; Vincent ter Schure pilot: Timo Fransen	2:59:13	Netherlands; Tristan Bangma pilot: Patrick Bos	3:05:01	France; Alexandre Lloveras pilot: Corentin Ermenault	3:06:14
Road race	H1–2	Florian Jouanny; France	1:49:36	Luca Mazzone; Italy	1:53:43	Sergio Garrote Munoz; Spain	1:54:36
Road race	H3	Ruslan Kuznetsov; RPC	2:34:35	Heinz Frei; Switzerland	2:34:35	Walter Ablinger; Austria	2:35:06
Road race	H4	Jetze Plat; Netherlands	2:15:13	Thomas Frühwirth; Austria	2:20:56	Alexander Gritsch; Austria	2:22:38
Road race	H5	Mitch Valize; Netherlands	2:24:30	Loïc Vergnaud; France	2:24:30	Tim de Vries; Netherlands	2:24:40
Road race	C1–3	Benjamin Watson; Great Britain	2:04:23	Finlay Graham; Great Britain	2:05:43	Alexandre Léauté; France	2:11:06
Road race	C4–5	Kévin Le Cunff; France	2:14:49	Yegor Dementyev; Ukraine	2:15:11	Daniel Abraham; Netherlands	2:15:20
Road race	T1–2	Chen Jianxin; China	51:07	Tim Celen; Belgium	52:15	Juan José Betancourt Quiroga; Colombia	52:41

==== Women's events ====
Event	Class	Gold		Silver		Bronze	
Time trial	B	Ireland; Katie-George Dunlevy pilot: Eve McCrystal	47:32.07	Great Britain; Lora Fachie pilot: Corrine Hall	48:32.06	Sweden; Louise Jannering pilot: Anna Svärdström	49:36.06
Time trial	H1–3	Annika Zeyen; Germany	32:46.97	Francesca Porcellato; Italy	33:30.52	Renata Kałuża; Poland	33:50.32
Time trial	H4–5	Oksana Masters; United States	45:40.05	Sun Bianbian; China	47:26.53	Jennette Jansen; Netherlands	48:45.69
Time trial	C1–3	Keiko Sugiura; Japan	25:55.76	Anna Beck; Sweden	26:18.03	Paige Greco; Australia	26:37.54
Time trial	C4	Shawn Morelli; United States	39:33.79	Emily Petricola; Australia	39:43.09	Meg Lemon; Australia	41:14.42
Time trial	C5	Sarah Storey; Great Britain	36:08.90	Crystal Lane-Wright; Great Britain	37:40.89	Kerstin Brachtendorf; Germany	38:34.49
Time trial	T1–2	Jana Majunke; Germany	36:06.17	Carol Cooke; Australia	36:38.46	Angelika Dreock-Käser; Germany	36:53.88
Road race	B	Ireland; Katie-George Dunlevy pilot: Eve McCrystal	2:35:53	Great Britain; Sophie Unwin pilot: Jenny Holl	2:36:00	Sweden; Louise Jannering pilot: Anna Svärdström	2:36:00
Road race	H1–4	Jennette Jansen; Netherlands	56:15	Annika Zeyen; Germany	56:21	Alicia Dana; United States	56:24
Road race	H5	Oksana Masters; United States	2:23:39	Sun Bianbian; China	2:26:50	Katia Aere; Italy	2:28:11
Road race	C1–3	Keiko Sugiura; Japan	1:12:55	Anna Beck; Sweden	1:13:11	Paige Greco; Australia	1:13:11
Road race	C4–5	Sarah Storey; Great Britain	2:21:51	Crystal Lane-Wright; Great Britain	2:21:58	Marie Patouillet; France	2:23:49
Road race	T1–2	Jana Majunke; Germany	1:00:58	Angelika Dreock-Käser; Germany	1:03:40	Jill Walsh; United States	1:05:48

==== Mixed team event ====
Event	Class	Gold		Silver		Bronze	
Road race relay	H1–5	Italy; Paolo Cecchetto; Luca Mazzone; Diego Colombari	52:32	France; Riadh Tarsim; Florian Jouanny; Loïc Vergnaud	53:03	United States; Ryan Pinney; Alicia Dana; Alfredo de los Santos	53:11

=== Track cycling ===
==== Men's events ====
Event	Class	Gold		Silver		Bronze	
Time trial	B	Great Britain; Neil Fachie pilot: Matt Rotherham	58.038 WR	Great Britain; James Ball pilot: Lewis Stewart	59.503	France; Raphael Beaugillet pilot: François Pervis	1:00.472
Time trial	C1–3	Li Zhangyu; China	1:03.877 WR	Alexandre Léauté; France	1:05.031 WR	Jaco van Gass; Great Britain	1:05.569 WR
Time trial	C4–5	Alfonso Cabello; Spain	1:01.557 WR	Jody Cundy; Great Britain	1:01.847 PR	Jozef Metelka; Slovakia	1:04.786
Individual pursuit	B	Netherlands; Tristan Bangma pilot: Patrick Bos	—	Great Britain; Steve Bate pilot: Adam Duggleby	— OVL	France; Alexandre Lloveras pilot: Corentin Ermenault	4:08.126
Individual pursuit	C1	Mikhail Astashov; RPC	—	Tristen Chernove; Canada	— OVL	Li Zhangyu; China	3:39.273
Individual pursuit	C2	Alexandre Léauté; France	3:31.478 WR	Darren Hicks; Australia	3:35.064	Liang Guihua; China	3:34.781
Individual pursuit	C3	Jaco van Gass; Great Britain	3:20.987	Finlay Graham; Great Britain	3:22.000	David Nicholas; Australia	3:25.877
Individual pursuit	C4	Jozef Metelka; Slovakia	—	Carol-Eduard Novak; Romania	— OVL	Diego German Duenas; Colombia	4:35.607
Individual pursuit	C5	Dorian Foulon; France	4:20.757	Alistair Donohoe; Australia	4:24.095	Yehor Dementyev; Ukraine	4:22.746

==== Women's events ====
Event	Class	Gold		Silver		Bronze	
Time trial	B	Netherlands; Larissa Klaassen pilot: Imke Brommer	1:05.291 PR	Great Britain; Aileen McGlynn pilot: Helen Scott	1:06.743	Belgium; Griet Hoet pilot: Anneleen Monsieur	1:07.943
Time trial	C1–3	Amanda Reid; Australia	35.581 WR	Alyda Norbruis; Netherlands	36.057	Qian Wangwei; China	38.070 WR
Time trial	C4–5	Kadeena Cox; Great Britain	34.433 WR	Kate O'Brien; Canada	35.439	Caroline Groot; Netherlands	35.599 WR
Individual pursuit	B	Great Britain; Lora Fachie pilot: Corrine Hall	3:19.560	Ireland; Katie-George Dunlevy pilot: Eve McCrystal	3:21.505	Great Britain; Sophie Unwin pilot: Jenny Holl	3:23.446
Individual pursuit	C1–3	Paige Greco; Australia	3:50.815 WR	Wang Xiaomei; China	3:54.975	Denise Schindler; Germany	3:55.120
Individual pursuit	C4	Emily Petricola; Australia	—	Shawn Morelli; United States	— OVL	Keely Shaw; Canada	3:48.342
Individual pursuit	C5	Sarah Storey; Great Britain	—	Crystal Lane-Wright; Great Britain	— OVL	Marie Patouillet; France	3:39.233

==== Mixed events ====
Event	Class	Gold		Silver		Bronze	
Team sprint	C1–5	Great Britain; Kadeena Cox; Jaco van Gass; Jody Cundy	47.579 WR	China; Li Zhangyu; Wu Guoqing; Lai Shanzhang	47.685	Spain; Ricardo Ten Argilés; Pablo Jaramillo Gallardo; Alfonso Cabello	49.209

== See also ==
- Cycling at the 2020 Summer Olympics
