= Cycling at the 2020 Summer Paralympics – Women's road race B =

Women's road race B at the XVI Paralympic Games
- Venue: Fuji Speedway
- Dates: 3 September 2021
- Competitors: 7 from 5 nations
- Winning time: 2:35:53

Medalists
| 1st place, gold medalist(s) | | Katie-George Dunlevy; Guide: Eve McCrystal | Ireland |
| 2nd place, silver medalist(s) | | Sophie Unwin; Guide: Jenny Holl | Great Britain |
| 3rd place, bronze medalist(s) | | Louise Jannering; Guide: Anna Svärdström | Sweden |

The women's road race B cycling event at the 2020 Summer Paralympics took place on 3 September 2021 at Fuji Speedway in Shizuoka Prefecture. 7 riders (and pilots) competed in the event.

The B classification is for cyclists with visual impairment. Sighted guides act as pilots in these events, which take place on tandem bikes.

== Results ==
The event took place on 3 September 2021 at 13:00.

| Rank | Rider Guide | Nationality | Time | Deficit |
|---|---|---|---|---|
| 1st place, gold medalist(s) | Katie-George Dunlevy; Guide: Eve McCrystal | Ireland | 2:35:53 | |
| 2nd place, silver medalist(s) | Sophie Unwin; Guide: Jenny Holl | Great Britain | 2:36:00 | +0:07 |
| 3rd place, bronze medalist(s) | Louise Jannering; Guide: Anna Svärdström | Sweden | 2:36:00 | +0:07 |
| 4 | Justyna Kiryła; Guide: Aleksandra Tecław | Poland | 2:39:22 | +3:29 |
| 5 | Lora Fachie; Guide: Corrine Hall | Great Britain | 2:40:26 | +4:33 |
| 6 | Dominika Putyra; Guide: Ewa Bańkowska | Poland | 2:43:33 | +7:40 |
| | Griet Hoet; Guide: Anneleen Monsieur | Belgium | DNF | |
