= Cycling at the 2020 Summer Paralympics – Women's time trial =

The women's time trial track cycling events at the 2020 Summer Paralympics will take place between August 26 to 27 2021 at the Izu Velodrome, Japan. Three events will take place in the women's event over six classifications. Two of those three events spanned multiple classifications were 'factored' events, with final times adjusted in line with classification to ensure fairness. The distance for the B event is 1000m while the other two (C1-3, C4-5) is 500m.

== Classification ==
Cyclists are given a classification depending on the type and extent of their disability. The classification system allows cyclists to compete against others with a similar level of function. The class number indicates the severity of impairment with "1" being most impaired.

Cycling classes are:

- B: Blind and visually impaired cyclists use a Tandem bicycle with a sighted pilot on the front
- T 1–2: Cyclists with an impairment that affects their balance use a tricycle
- C 1-5: Cyclists with an impairment that affects their legs, arms, and/or trunk but are capable of using a standard bicycle

== Schedule ==
F	Finals

Women's time trial
Event↓/Date →	August 26	August 27
B	F	
C1-3		F
C4-5		F

== Medal table ==
Rank	NPC	Gold	Silver	Bronze	Total
1	Netherlands	1	1	1	3
2	Great Britain	1	1	0	2
3	Australia	1	0	0	1
4	Canada	0	1	0	1
5	Belgium	0	0	1	1
5	China	0	0	1	1
Totals (6 entries)		3	3	3	9

== Medal summary ==
Classification	Gold		Silver		Bronze	
B	Netherlands; Larissa Klaassen piloted by Imke Brommer	1:05.291 PR	Great Britain; Aileen McGlynn piloted by Helen Scott	1:06.743	Belgium; Griet Hoet piloted by Anneleen Monsieur	1:07.943
C1-3	Amanda Reid; Australia	35.581 WR	Alyda Norbruis; Netherlands	36.057	Qian Wangwei; China	38.070 WR
C4-5	Kadeena Cox; Great Britain	34.433 WR	Kate O'Brien; Canada	35.439	Caroline Groot; Netherlands	35.599 WR
