= Cycling at the 2024 Summer Paralympics – Women's time trial B =

Women's time trial B at the XVII Paralympic Games
- Venue: Vélodrome National, Paris
- Dates: 30 August 2024
- Competitors: 20 from 7 nations
- Teams: 10
- Winning time: 1:06.976

Medalists
1st place, gold medalist(s)		Elizabeth Jordan; Pilot: Dannielle Khan	Great Britain
2nd place, silver medalist(s)		Jessica Gallagher; Pilot: Caitlin Ward	Australia
3rd place, bronze medalist(s)		Sophie Unwin; Pilot: Jenny Holl	Great Britain

The women's time trial class B track cycling event at the 2024 Summer Paralympics took place on 30 August 2024 in the Vélodrome National, Paris. This class is for the cyclist who is blind or has visual impairments, they will then ride with tandem bicycles together with a sighted cyclist (also known as the pilot). There will be 10 pairs from 7 different nations competing.

== Competition format ==
The 10 pairs are placed into their own heats individually where they will then do the time trial. The two fastest pairs qualify for the gold final, the next two pairs qualify for the bronze final.

== Schedule ==
All times are Central European Summer Time (UTC+2)

Date	Time	Round
30 August	13:58	Qualifying
30 August	16:34	Final

== Results ==
=== Qualifying ===
Rank	Heat	Cyclists	Nation	Result	Notes
1	6	Elizabeth Jordan; Pilot: Dannielle Khan	Great Britain	1:06.870	Q
2	6	Jessica Gallagher; Pilot: Caitlin Ward	Australia	1:07.214	Q
3	5	Sophie Unwin; Pilot: Jenny Holl	Great Britain	1:07.719	Q
4	4	Lora Fachie; Pilot: Corrine Hall	Great Britain	1:09.018	Q
5	5	Katie-George Dunlevy; Pilot: Eve McCrystal	Ireland	1:09.094	Q
6	4	Hannah Chadwick; Pilot: Skyler Espinoza	United States	1:09.581	Q
7	2	Josephine Healion; Pilot: Linda Kelly	Ireland	1:10.808	
8	3	Nur Suraiya Muhamad Zamri; Pilot: Farina Shawati Mohd Adnan	Malaysia	1:12.992	
9	2	María José Quiroga; Pilot: Micaela Barroso	Argentina	1:15.574	
10	1	Watcharobon Boonmalert; Pilot: Kanyarat Kesthonglang	Thailand	1:17.748	

=== Final ===
Rank	Cyclists	Nation	Result	Notes
1st place, gold medalist(s)	Elizabeth Jordan; Pilot: Dannielle Khan	Great Britain	1:06.976	
2nd place, silver medalist(s)	Jessica Gallagher; Pilot: Caitlin Ward	Australia	1:07.533	
3rd place, bronze medalist(s)	Sophie Unwin; Pilot: Jenny Holl	Great Britain	1:07.879	
4	Lora Fachie; Pilot: Corrine Hall	Great Britain	1:09.181	
5	Katie-George Dunlevy; Pilot: Eve McCrystal	Ireland	1:09.447	
6	Hannah Chadwick; Pilot: Skyler Espinoza	United States	1:10.187	
