= Cycling at the 2016 Summer Paralympics – Women's road race B =

Cycling, Women's road race B at the XV Paralympic Games
- Venue: Pontal, Rio
- Dates: September 17
- Competitors: 17 (and 17 pilots)

The women's road race B cycling event at the 2016 Summer Paralympics took place on September 17 at Pontal, Rio. The race distance was 60 km.

== Results : Women's road race B ==
Rank	Names	Nationality	Classification	Time	Deficit
1st place, gold medalist(s)	Iwona Podkościelna; Aleksandra Teclaw	Poland	B	01:58:02	0
2nd place, silver medalist(s)	Katie-George Dunlevy; Evelyn Mccrystal	Ireland	B	01:59:01	59
3rd place, bronze medalist(s)	Emma Foy; Laura Thompson	New Zealand	B	01:59:33	01:31
4	Lora Turnham; Corrine Hall	Great Britain	B	02:01:16	03:14
5	Robbi Weldon; Audrey Lemieux	Canada	B	02:01:16	s.t.
6	Adamantia Chalkiadaki; Argyro Milaki	Greece	B	02:02:52	04:50
7	Odette Van Deudekom; Kim Van Dijk	Netherlands	B	02:02:52	s.t.
8	Josefa Benitez Guzman; Beatriu Gomez Franquet	Spain	B	02:06:21	08:19
9	Shawn Cheshire; Mackenzie Woodring	United States	B	02:07:05	09:03
10	Yurie Kanuma; Mai Tanaka	Japan	B	02:07:23	09:21
11	Amanda Cameron; Hannah Van Kampen	New Zealand	B	02:07:41	09:39
12	Shawna Ryan; Joanie Caron	Canada	B	02:11:40	13:38
13	Anna Duzikowska; Natalia Morytko	Poland	B	02:12:14	14:12
14	Griet Hoet; Anneleen Monsieur	Belgium	B	02:19:11	21:09
15	Marcia Fanhani; Mariane Ferreira	Brazil	B	02:29:15	31:13
16	Paraskevi Kantza; Vasiliki Voutzali	Greece	B	02:43	44:58
0	Larissa Klaassen; Haliegh Dolman	Netherlands	B	DNF	
