= Cycling at the 2024 Summer Paralympics – Women's road time trial B =

Women's road time trial B at the XVII Paralympic Games
- Venue: Clichy-sous-Bois
- Dates: 4 September
- Competitors: 20 from 7 nations
- Teams: 10
- Winning time: 38:16.58

Medalists
| 1st place, gold medalist(s) | | Katie-George Dunlevy; Pilot: Linda Kelly | Ireland |
| 2nd place, silver medalist(s) | | Sophie Unwin; Pilot: Jenny Holl | Great Britain |
| 3rd place, bronze medalist(s) | | Lora Fachie; Pilot: Corrine Hall | Great Britain |

The Women's time trial B road cycling event at the 2024 Summer Paralympics took place on 4 September 2024, at Clichy-sous-Bois, Paris. Ten riders (and pilots) competed in the event.

The B classification is for cyclists with visual impairment. Sighted guides act as pilots in these events, which take place on tandem bikes.

== Results ==
| Rank | Rider | Nationality | Class | Time | Deficit |
|---|---|---|---|---|---|
| 1st place, gold medalist(s) | Katie-George Dunlevy; Pilot: Linda Kelly | Ireland | (B) | 38:16.58 | |
| 2nd place, silver medalist(s) | Sophie Unwin; Pilot: Jenny Holl | Great Britain | (B) | 39:40.18 | + 01:23.60 |
| 3rd place, bronze medalist(s) | Lora Fachie; Pilot: Corrine Hall | Great Britain | (B) | 40:41.30 | + 02:24.72 |
| 4 | Anne-Sophie Centis; Pilot: Elise Delzenne | France | (B) | 41:39.65 | + 03:23.07 |
| 5 | Josephine Healion; Pilot: Eve McCrystal | Ireland | (B) | 41:57.61 | + 03:41.03 |
| 6 | Elizabeth Jordan; Pilot: Dannielle Khan | Great Britain | (B) | 42:59.54 | + 04:42.96 |
| 7 | Louise Jannering; Pilot: Catrin Nilsson | Sweden | (B) | 43:19.76 | + 05:03.18 |
| 8 | Patrycja Kuter; Pilot: Katarzyna Kornasiewicz | Poland | (B) | 43:34.75 | + 05:18.17 |
| 9 | Watcharobon Boonmalert; Pilot: Kanyarat Kesthonglang | Thailand | (B) | 49:25.00 | + 11:08.42 |
| 10 | Nur Suraiya Muhammad Zamri; Pilot: Farina Shawati Mohd Adnan | Malaysia | (B) | 50:48.55 | + 12:31.97 |
