= Sweden at the 2020 Summer Paralympics =

- Flag of Sweden
- IPC code: SWE
- NPC: Swedish Parasports Federation

in Tokyo, Japan August 24, 2021 – September 5, 2021
- Competitors: 26 in 11 sports
- Medals: Gold 1 Silver 5 Bronze 2 Total 8

Summer Paralympics appearances (overview)
- 1960; 1964; 1968; 1972; 1976; 1980; 1984; 1988; 1992; 1996; 2000; 2004; 2008; 2012; 2016; 2020; 2024

Sweden competed at the 2020 Summer Paralympics in Tokyo, Japan, which took place from 24 August to 5 September 2021. This was their sixteenth consecutive appearance at the Summer Paralympics since 1960. The Swedish team consisted of 26 athletes in 11 sports.

== Medalists ==
Medal	Athlete/s	Sport	Event	Date
Gold	Philip Jönsson	Shooting	Mixed 10 m air rifle standing SH2	30 August
Silver	Louise Etzner Jakobsson	Equestrian	Individual freestyle test grade IV	30 August
Silver	Anna Beck	Cycling	Women's road time trial C1–3	31 August
Silver	Anna Beck	Cycling	Women's road race C1–3	3 September
Silver	Anna-Carin Ahlquist; Ingela Lundbäck	Table tennis	Women's team class 4–5	3 September
Silver	Anna Normann	Shooting	Mixed R6 50 metre rifle prone SH1	5 September
Bronze	Louise Jannering; Guide: Anna Svärdström	Cycling	Women's road time trial B	31 August
Bronze	Louise Jannering; Guide: Anna Svärdström	Cycling	Women's road race B	3 September

== Competitors ==
The following is the list of number of competitors participating in the Games.

Sport	Men	Women	Total
Archery	0	1	1
Athletics	2	1	3
Boccia	0	1	1
Canoeing	0	1	1
Cycling	2	2	4
Equestrian	0	2	2
Judo	0	1	1
Shooting	3	2	5
Swimming	0	2	2
Table tennis	3	2	5
Wheelchair tennis	1	0	1
Total	11	15	26

== Archery ==
Sweden collected one quota place at the 2019 Para Archery World Championships held in Den Bosch, Netherlands.

Athlete	Event	Ranking round		Round of 32	Round of 16	Quarterfinals	Semifinals	Finals	
Athlete	Event	Score	Seed	Opposition score	Opposition score	Opposition score	Opposition score	Opposition score	Rank
Zandra Reppe	Women's individual compound open	643	24	Li (CHN); L 134–138	Did not advance				17

== Athletics ==
Men's field

Athlete	Event	Final	
Athlete	Event	Result	Rank
Tobias Jonsson	Men's long jump T12	6.50	7
Olof Ryberg	Men's long jump T12	6.25	8

Per Jonsson was qualified and selected to compete in men's long jump T12, but was injured shortly before the games and was replaced by Olof Ryberg.

Women's field

Athlete	Event	Final	
Athlete	Event	Result	Rank
Viktoria Karlsson	Women's long jump T11	4.55	6

== Boccia ==
Athlete	Event	Group				Quarterfinals	Semifinals	Final	Rank
Athlete	Event	Opposition Result	Opposition Result	Opposition Result	Rank	Opposition Result	Opposition Result	Opposition Result	Rank
Maria Bjurström	Individual BC3	de Oliveira (BRA); L 2–4	Michel (AUS); L 2–8	Chaipanich (THA); W 7–0	3	Did not advance			15

== Canoeing ==
Athlete	Event	Heats		Semifinals		Final	
Athlete	Event	Time	Rank	Time	Rank	Time	Rank
Helene Ripa	Women's KL3	53.005	2 SF	51.220	2 FA	52.307	5

== Cycling ==
Sweden is scheduled to compete in cycling (male and female road events) at the 2020 Summer Paralympics.

=== Road ===
Athlete	Event	Time	Rank
Anna Beck	Women's road race C1–3	1:13:11	2nd place, silver medalist(s)
Anna Beck	Women's road time trial C1–3	26:18.03	2nd place, silver medalist(s)
Louise Jannering; Pilot: Anna Svärdström	Women's road race B	2:36:00	3rd place, bronze medalist(s)
Louise Jannering; Pilot: Anna Svärdström	Women's road time trial B	49:36.06	3rd place, bronze medalist(s)
Henrik Marvig	Men's road race C1–3	2:11:43	11
Daniel Strandberg	Men's road race C1–3	2:23:00	21
Daniel Strandberg	Men's road time trial C3	38:37.17	11

=== Track ===
Athlete	Event	Qualification		Final	
Athlete	Event	Time	Rank	Opposition Time	Rank
Anna Beck	Women's individual pursuit C1–3	4:03.035	6	Did not advance	
Louise Jannering; Pilot: Jenny Eliasson	Women's individual pursuit B	3:53.457	9	Did not advance	
Louise Jannering; Pilot: Jenny Eliasson	Women's time trial B	—N/a		1:19.965	10
Henrik Marvig	Men's time trial C1–3	—N/a		1:18.100	19

== Equestrian ==
Sweden sent two athletes, Louise Etzner Jakobsson and Lena Malmström.

Athlete	Horse	Event	Final	
Athlete	Horse	Event	Result	Rank
Louise Etzner Jakobsson	Goldstrike B.J.	Individual Championship test grade IV	72.634	4
Louise Etzner Jakobsson	Goldstrike B.J.	Individual Freestyle test grade IV	75.935	2nd place, silver medalist(s)
Lena Malmström	Fabolous Fidelie	Individual Championship test grade V	69.833	6
Lena Malmström	Fabolous Fidelie	Individual Freestyle test grade V	71.505	7

== Judo ==
Athlete	Event	Round of 16	Quarterfinals	Semifinals	Repechage round 1	Repechage round 2	Final/ Bronze medal contest	
Athlete	Event	Opposition Result	Opposition Result	Opposition Result	Opposition Result	Opposition Result	Opposition Result	Rank
Nicolina Pernheim	Women's 63 kg	Bye	Husieva (UKR); L 01–10	Did not advance	Pozdnysheva (RPC); L 00–10	Did not advance		7

== Shooting ==
Sweden qualified for the 2020 Summer Paralympics after their results at the 2018 World Shooting Para Sport Championships and the 2019 World Shooting Para Sport World Cup.

The athletes that qualified for the 2020 Summer Paralympics are Bang Yu-jeong, Håkan Gustafsson, Philip Jönsson, Joackim Norberg and Anna Normann.

Athlete	Event	Qualification		Final	
Athlete	Event	Points	Rank	Points	Rank
Bang Yu-jeong	Women's 10 m air pistol SH1	543	14	Did not advance	
Håkan Gustafsson	Men's 10 m air rifle standing SH1	612.6	13	Did not advance	
Philip Jönsson	Mixed 10 m air rifle standing SH2	632.0	6 Q	252.8	(gold) PR
Philip Jönsson	Mixed 10 m air rifle prone SH2	632.0	23	Did not advance	
Philip Jönsson	Mixed 50 m air rifle prone SH2	623.1	7	143.0	7
Joackim Norberg	Men's 10 m air pistol SH1	551	19	Did not advance	
Joackim Norberg	Mixed 25 m pistol SH1	556	14	Did not advance	
Joackim Norberg	Mixed 50 m pistol SH1	513	23	Did not advance	
Anna Normann	Women's 10 m air rifle standing SH1	622.1	6 Q	121.3	8
Anna Normann	Women's 50 m air rifle 3 positions SH1	1177 WR	1	424.4	5
Anna Normann	Mixed 10 m air rifle prone SH1	630.5	24	Did not advance	
Anna Normann	Mixed 50 m air rifle prone SH1	620.2	5 Q	248.5	2nd place, silver medalist(s)

Legend: Q=Qualified; PR=Paralympic record

== Swimming ==
Two Swedish swimmer has successfully entered the paralympic slot after breaking the MQS.

Athlete	Event	Heat		Final	
Athlete	Event	Result	Rank	Result	Rank
Pernilla Lindberg	200 m freestyle S14	2:12.86	5 Q	2:12.33	5
Pernilla Lindberg	100 m breaststroke SB14	1:21.37	8 Q	1:21.56	8
Pernilla Lindberg	100 m backstroke S14	1:14.71	9	Did not advance	
Pernilla Lindberg	100 m butterfly S14	1:11.79	10	Did not advance	
Pernilla Lindberg	200 m individual medley SM14	2:34.02	6	2:32.01	5
Lina Watz	400 m freestyle S9	5:11.19	13	Did not advance	
Lina Watz	100 m backstroke S9	1:13.70	5 Q	1:14.86	7

Legend: Q=Qualified; ER=European record; NR=National record

== Table tennis ==
Sweden entered four athletes into the table tennis competition at the games. Anna-Carin Ahlquist & Ingela Lundbäck qualified from 2019 ITTF European Para Championships which was held in Helsingborg, Sweden and Alexander Öhgren & Emil Andersson via World Ranking allocation.

Men

Athlete	Event	Group stage			Round of 16	Quarterfinals	Semifinals	Final	
Athlete	Event	Opposition Result	Opposition Result	Rank	Opposition Result	Opposition Result	Opposition Result	Opposition Result	Rank
Emil Andersson	Individual C8	Charitsat (THA); W 3–0	Bouvais (FRA); L 0–3	2 Q	Wilson (GBR); L 0–3	Did not advance			9
Linus Karlsson	Individual C8	Ye (CHN); W 3–2	Guarnieri Manara (BRA); W 3–1	1 Q	McKibbin (GBR); L 2–3	Did not advance			9
Alexander Öhgren	Individual C3	Andrade de Freitas (BRA); L w/o	Glinbancheun (THA); L w/o	3	Did not advance				
Emil Andersson; Linus Karlsson	Team C8	—N/a				France (FRA); L 1–2	Did not advance		5

Alexander Öhgren developed cold symptoms. While he tested negative for COVID-19 he was nevertheless forced to withdraw from the games.

Women

Athlete	Event	Group stage			Round of 16	Quarterfinals	Semifinals	Final	
Athlete	Event	Opposition Result	Opposition Result	Rank	Opposition Result	Opposition Result	Opposition Result	Opposition Result	Rank
Anna-Carin Ahlquist	Individual C3	Altıntaş (BRA); W 3–1	Asayut (THA); W 3–1	1 Q	Bye	Kanova (SVK); L 0–3	Did not advance		5
Ingela Lundbäck	Individual C5	Zhang (CHN); L 1–3	Mahmoud (EGY); W 3–0	2 Q	—N/a	Pan (CHN); L 2–3	Did not advance		5
Anna-Carin Ahlquist; Ingela Lundbäck	Team C4–5	—N/a				Thailand (THA); W 2–0	Serbia (SRB); W 2–0	China (CHN); L 1–2	2nd place, silver medalist(s)

== Wheelchair tennis ==
Sweden qualified one player for wheelchair tennis. Stefan Olsson qualified by the world rankings.

Athlete	Event	Round of 64	Round of 32	Round of 16	Quarterfinals	Semifinals	Final / BM	
Athlete	Event	Opposition Score	Opposition Score	Opposition Score	Opposition Score	Opposition Score	Opposition Score	Rank
Stefan Olsson	Men's singles	Daniel Rodrigues (BRA); W 6–3, 6–2	Arai (JPN); W 6–0, 6–2	Egberink (NED); L 6–1, 6–7, 3–6	Did not advance			9

== See also ==
- Sweden at the Paralympics
- Sweden at the 2020 Summer Olympics
