= Cycling at the 2024 Summer Paralympics – Women's road race B =

Women's road race B at the XVII Paralympic Games
- Dates: 6 September 2024
- Competitors: 22 from 8 nations
- Winning time: 2:37:26

Medalists
1st place, gold medalist(s)		Sophie Unwin; Pilot: Jenny Holl	Great Britain
2nd place, silver medalist(s)		Katie-George Dunlevy; Pilot: Linda Kelly	Ireland
3rd place, bronze medalist(s)		Lora Fachie; Pilot: Corrine Hall	Great Britain

The women's road race B cycling event at the 2024 Summer Paralympics took place on 6 September 2024. Eleven riders (and eleven pilots) competed in the event.

The B classification is for cyclists with visual impairment. Sighted guides act as pilots in these events, which take place on tandem bikes.

== Schedule ==
F	Finals

Women's Road Race
Event↓/Date →	5 September	6 September	7 September
B		F	
H1-4	F		
H5	F		
C1-3			F
C4-5		F	
T1-2			F

== Results ==
Rank	Rider	Nationality	Time	Deficit	Notes
1st place, gold medalist(s)	Sophie Unwin; Pilot: Jenny Holl	Great Britain	2:37:26		
2nd place, silver medalist(s)	Katie-George Dunlevy; Pilot: Linda Kelly	Ireland	2:37:29	+00:03	
3rd place, bronze medalist(s)	Lora Fachie; Pilot: Corrine Hall	Great Britain	2:39:01	+01:35	
4	Josephine Healion; Pilot: Eve McCrystal	Ireland	2:42:05	+04:39	
5	Anne-Sophie Centis; Pilot: Elise Delzenne	France	2:42:54	+05:28	
6	Louise Jannering; Pilot: Catrin Nilsson	Sweden	2:46:37	+09:11	
7	Elizabeth Jordan; Pilot: Dannielle Khan	Great Britain	2:50:41	+13:15	
8	Nur Azlia Syafinaz Mohd Zais; Pilot: Nurul Suhada Zainal	Malaysia	-1 Lap	–	
9	Watcharobon Boonmalert; Pilot: Kanyarat Kesthonglang	Thailand	-1 Lap	–	
–	Patrycja Kuter; Pilot: Katarzyna Kornasiewicz	Poland	DNF	–	
DNS	Maria Jose Quiroga; Pilot: Micaela Belen Barroso	Argentina	DNS		
