= Cycling at the 2020 Summer Paralympics – Women's individual pursuit B =

Women's individual pursuit B at the XVI Paralympic Games
- Venue: Izu Velodrome
- Dates: 28 August 2021
- Competitors: 18 from 7 nations
- Teams: 9

Medalists
1st place, gold medalist(s)		Lora Fachie piloted by Corrine Hall	Great Britain
2nd place, silver medalist(s)		Katie-George Dunlevy piloted by Eve McCrystal	Ireland
3rd place, bronze medalist(s)		Sophie Unwin piloted by Jenny Holl	Great Britain

The women's individual pursuit class B track cycling event at the 2020 Summer Paralympics took place on 28 August 2021 at the Izu Velodrome, Japan. This class is for the cyclist who is blind or has visual impairments, thus they ride tandem bicycles with a sighted cyclist (also known as the pilot). There will be 9 pairs (18 competitors athlete+pilots) from 7 different nations competing.

== Competition format ==
The competition starts with a qualifying round where a time trial basis will be between the 9 pairs; all 9 pairs will be divided into 5 heats, all heats having 2 pairs except heat 1 which will have 1 pair. The 2 fastest pairs in the qualifying would qualify to the gold medal final while the 3rd and 4th fastest will qualify to the bronze medal final where they will race head-to-head. The distance of this event is 3000m. The medal finals are also held on the same day as the qualifying.

== Schedule ==
All times are Japan Standard Time (UTC+9)

Date	Time	Round
25 August	10:00	Qualifying
25 August	11:47	Finals

== Records ==
World Record	Emma Foy (pilot: Hannah van Kampen) (NZL)	3:20.819	Milton, Canada	31 January 2020
Paralympic Record	Lora Fachie (pilot: Corrine Hall) (GBR)	3:27.460	Rio de Janeiro, Brazil	11 September 2016

== Results ==
=== Qualifying ===
Rank	Heat	Nation	Cyclists	Result	Notes
1	5	Great Britain	Lora Fachie piloted by Corrine Hall	3:19.483	QG, WR
2	4	Ireland	Katie-George Dunlevy piloted by Eve McCrystal	3:19.946	QG
3	2	Great Britain	Sophie Unwin piloted by Jenny Holl	3:22.670	QB
4	5	Belgium	Griet Hoet piloted by Anneleen Monsieur	3:25.418	QB
5	2	Poland	Dominika Putyra piloted by Ewa Bańkowska	3:26.483	
6	4	Poland	Justyna Kiryła piloted by Aleksandra Tecław	3:31.875	
7	3	Netherlands	Larissa Klaassen piloted by Imke Brommer	3:32.620	
8	3	Great Britain	Aileen McGlynn piloted by Helen Scott	3:35.858	
9	1	Sweden	Louise Jannering piloted by Jenny Eliasson	3:53.457	

=== Finals ===
Rank	Nation	Cyclists	Result	Notes
Gold medal final
1st place, gold medalist(s)	Great Britain	Lora Fachie piloted by Corrine Hall	3:19.560	
2nd place, silver medalist(s)	Ireland	Katie-George Dunlevy piloted by Eve McCrystal	3:21.505	
Bronze medal final
3rd place, bronze medalist(s)	Great Britain	Sophie Unwin piloted by Jenny Holl	3:23.446	
4	Belgium	Griet Hoet piloted by Anneleen Monsieur	3:25.654	
