= Elizabeth Jordan (cyclist) =

British Paralympic cyclist

Elizabeth Jordan MBE
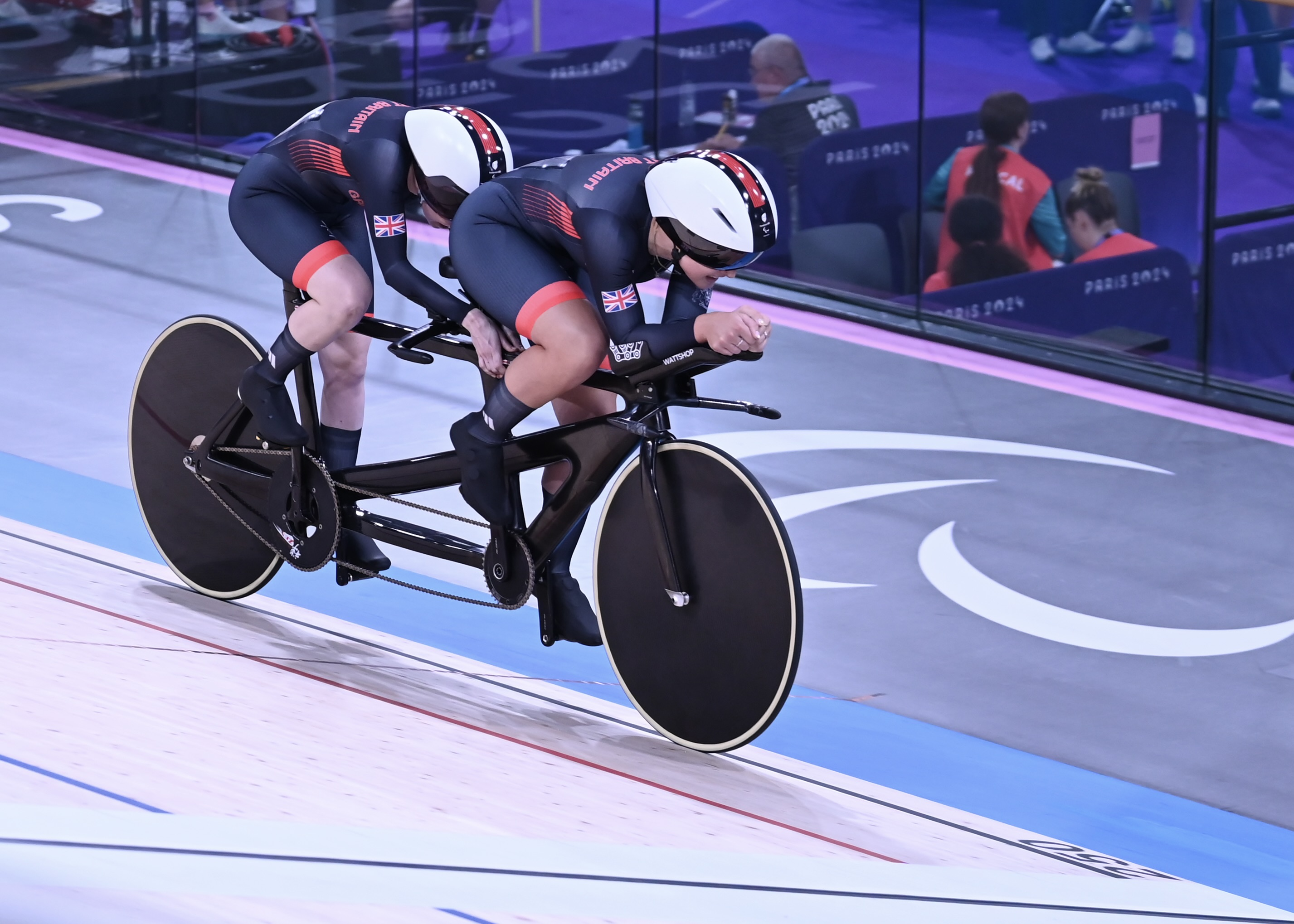
- Jordan (right) and Dannielle Khan at the 2024 Paralympics

Personal information
- Full name: Elizabeth Victoria Jordan
- Nickname: Lizzi
- Born: 7 November 1997 (age 28)

Cycling career
- Sport: Cycling
- Current team: Great Britain Cycling Team; Charlotteville Cycling Club
Medal record
Women's para cycling
Representing Great Britain
Paralympic Games
Gold medal – first place	2024 Paris	Time trial B
Track World Championships
Gold medal – first place	2023 Glasgow	Mixed team sprint B
Gold medal – first place	2024 Rio de Janeiro	Sprint B
Gold medal – first place	2024 Rio de Janeiro	Time trial B
Gold medal – first place	2024 Rio de Janeiro	Ind. Pursuit B
Gold medal – first place	2025 Rio de Janeiro	Sprint B
Gold medal – first place	2025 Rio de Janeiro	Time trial B
Gold medal – first place	2026 Apeldoorn	Mixed team sprint B
Silver medal – second place	2022 Saint-Quentin-en-Yvelines	Ind. Pursuit B
Bronze medal – third place	2023 Glasgow	Time trial B
Bronze medal – third place	2025 Rio de Janeiro	Ind. pursuit B
Bronze medal – third place	2025 Rio de Janeiro	Mixed team sprint B
Bronze medal – third place	2026 Apeldoorn	Time trial B
Bronze medal – third place	2026 Apeldoorn	Sprint B
Representing England
Commonwealth Games
Bronze medal – third place	2026 Glasgow	Tandem sprint B

Elizabeth Victoria Jordan (born 7 November 1997) is a British racing cyclist who competes in para-cycling tandem road and track events as a visually impaired athlete. She made her Paralympic debut representing Great Britain at the 2024 Games in Paris, where she won gold in the time trial B alongside Dannielle Khan.

== Early life ==
Lizzi Jordan was born on 7 November 1997 and grew up in Surrey. Her parents are Trevor and Vicky Jordan, and she has an older sister, Chloe. She was a keen equestrian during her childhood. She completed her A-levels at Woking College and began a degree in Psychology at Royal Holloway, University of London in September 2016.

In September 2017, Jordan contracted a severe and rare e-coli infection after eating a takeaway meal. Her condition declined and she was hospitalised at University College London Hospitals in London and put in a medically-induced coma for two months. She was able to be discharged just before Christmas 2017. The infection had caused optic nerve atrophy, leaving her with no sight. She also had to re-learn how to walk. Just six months later, Jordan completed her local Parkrun with her dad, Trevor, as her guide. 18 months after being hospitalised, Jordan ran the 2019 London Marathon, raising more than £15,000 for the RNIB charity in the process.

== Career ==
=== Career beginnings ===
Following her London Marathon success Jordan was contacted by British Cycling, who invited her to one of their Talent ID days in Manchester in the summer of 2020. Despite having never cycled competitively before, coaches were impressed by her power test results and she was invited to join the para-cycling Foundation Team. Jordan first met her coach, Helen Scott, at the Talent ID day; they have worked together closely ever since.

=== 2022 ===
Jordan competed at the 2022 UCI Para-cycling Track World Championships, her first major track competition, having been named in the team on 11 October. She was piloted by Corrine Hall. Together they raced in the time trial B, finishing fifth. They also competed in the individual pursuit, where they won a silver medal, beaten only by GB teammates Sophie Unwin and Jenny Holl.

=== 2023 ===
On 11 July, British Cycling announced that Jordan had been selected for the 2023 UCI Cycling World Championships, held in Glasgow. These Championships included para-cycling events alongside able-bodied events, across road, track, and mountain-bike disciplines. Jordan was piloted by Amy Cole. They competed in four track events, coming away with medals in two. They won gold with Neil Fachie and his pilot, Matt Rotherham, in the mixed tandem team sprint. Jordan and Cole additionally took bronze in the individual time trial. They also competed in the individual pursuit (sixth) and the sprint (seventh). Jordan also competed in the Road World Championships for the first time, racing in the time trial (where she and Cole finished fourth) and in the road race (ninth).

Following her strong World Championship results, Jordan was promoted by British Cycling to the para-cycling Podium Squad.

=== 2024 ===
In March 2024 Jordan was selected for her third Track World Championships, held in Rio de Janeiro. She was piloted by Dannielle Khan, with whom she had been working for three months. The new pairing was very successful, winning three gold medals in the sprint, time trial and individual pursuit.

On 22 July Jordan was named in the ParalympicsGB cycling squad that would compete at the 2024 Paralympic Games in Paris. She was piloted by Khan. Together they competed in both women's B track events. They finished fourth in the individual pursuit (with the gold and bronze medals being won by their compatriots) and won Paralympic gold in the time trial. On the road they competed in both the road race and the time trial, finishing seventh (affected by a mechanical issue) and sixth respectively.

The pair also competed at the Road World Championships that took place in Zurich that September. They finished sixth in the time trial and did not finish the road race due to illness.

=== 2025 ===
At the 2025 UCI Para-cycling Track World Championships, Jordan and her pilot Dannielle Khan won the gold medal in the Women's B 1 km Time Trial, recording a time of 1:06.796 to defeat New Zealand’s tandem of Emma Foy and Jesse Hodges.

The pair also claimed a second gold medal in the Women's B Sprint, winning the final 2–0 against Australia's Jessica Gallagher and Jacqui Mengler-Mohr.

=== 2026 ===
Representing England and with new pilot, Sylvia Misztal, Jordan won the bronze medal in the Tandem sprint B at the Commonwealth Games in Glasgow, Scotland.

At the 2026 UCI Para Cycling Track Worlds, Jordan won 3 medals for Team GB with another new pilot Anna Whitworth-Hay. A bronze in the B Sprint, a bronze in the B 1km Time Trial and a gold in the B Mixed Team Sprint alongside James Ball of Wales and his pilot Aaron Pope from Scotland.

== Awards and honours ==
Jordan and Khan won Female Ride of the Year at the 2024 British Cycling Awards. The other nominees were road racer Anna Henderson, fellow tandem riders Sophie Unwin and Jenny Holl, and sprinters Sophie Capewell, Emma Finucane and Katy Marchant.

Jordan was appointed Member of the Order of the British Empire (MBE) in the 2025 New Year Honours for services to cycling.
