= Cycling at the 2016 Summer Paralympics – Women's individual pursuit B =

Cycling, Women's Ind. Pursuit B at the XV Paralympic Games
- Venue: Rio Olympic Velodrome
- Dates: September 8, 2016
- Competitors: 14 from 10 nations

Medalists
1st place, gold medalist(s)		Lora Turnham pilot : Corrine Hall	Great Britain
2nd place, silver medalist(s)		Emma Foy pilot : Laura Thompson	New Zealand
3rd place, bronze medalist(s)		Sophie Thornhill pilot : Helen Scott	Great Britain

The women's Individual Pursuit B track cycling event at the 2016 Summer Paralympics took place on September 11. This class is for blind and visually impaired cyclists riding with a sighted pilot. Fourteen pairs from 10 different nations compete.

The competition began with seven head to head races between the 14 riders. These races were held over a 3000m course (12 laps of the standard velodrome) and each rider is given a time for their race. The fastest two riders are advanced to the gold medal final whilst the third and fourth fastest times race it out for the bronze. The medal finals are held on the same day as the heats.

== Preliminaries ==
Q = Qualifier for gold final Qb = Qualifier for bronze final PR = Paralympic Record WR = World Record

Rank	Name	Country	Time	Avg. Speed	Notes
1	Lora Turnham pilot : Corrine Hall	Great Britain	3:27.460	52.058	PR Q
2	Emma Foy pilot : Laura Thompson	New Zealand	3:28.563	51.782	Q
3	Sophie Thornhill pilot : Helen Scott	Great Britain	3:32.609	50.797	Qb
4	Amanda Cameron pilot : Hannah Van Kampen	New Zealand	3:33.298	50.633	Qb
5	Katie George Dunleavy pilot : Evelyn McCrystal	Ireland	3:33.471	50.592	
6	Yurie Kanuma pilot : Mai Tanaka	Japan	3:34.892	50.257	
7	Griet Hoet pilot : Anneleen Monsieur	Belgium	3:40.770	48.919	
8	Iwona Podkoscielna pilot : Aleksandra Teclaw	Poland	3:41.944	48.660	
9	Jessica Gallagher pilot : Madison Janssen	Australia	3:45.744	47.841	
10	Adamantia Chalkiadaki pilot : Argyro Milaki	Greece	3:46.620	47.656	
11	Josefa Benitez Guzman pilot : Beatriu Gomez Franquet	Spain	3:46.984	47.580	
12	Anna Duzikowska pilot : Natalia Morytko	Poland	3:48.026	47.363	
13	Marcia Fanhani pilot : Mariane Ferreira	Brazil	4:10.058	43.189	
14	Paraskevi Kantza pilot : Vasiliki Voutzali	Greece	4:14.308	42.468	

== Finals ==
Gold medal match

Name	Time	Rank
Lora Turnham (Pilot : Corrine Hall) (GBR)	3:28.050	1st place, gold medalist(s)
Emma Foy (Pilot : Laura Thompson) (NZL)	3:31.569	2nd place, silver medalist(s)

Bronze medal match

Name	Time	Rank
Sophie Thornhill (Pilot : Helen Scott) (GBR)	OVL	3rd place, bronze medalist(s)
Amanda Cameron (Pilot : Hannah van Kampen) (NZL)	caught	4
