= Cycling at the 2024 Summer Paralympics – Women's pursuit B =

Women's individual pursuit B at the XVII Paralympic Games
- Venue: Vélodrome National
- Dates: 1 September 2024
- Competitors: 22 from 8 nations
- Teams: 11
- Winning time: 3:19.149

Medalists
1st place, gold medalist(s)		Sophie Unwin; Jenny Holl	Great Britain
2nd place, silver medalist(s)		Katie-George Dunlevy; Eve McCrystal	Ireland
3rd place, bronze medalist(s)		Lora Fachie; Corrine Hall	Great Britain

The women's individual pursuit class B track cycling event at the 2024 Summer Paralympics took place on 1 September 2024 at the Vélodrome National. This class is for the cyclist who is blind or has visual impairments, thus they ride tandem bicycles with a sighted cyclist (also known as the pilot). There will be 11 pairs (22 competitors athlete+pilots) from 8 different nations competing.

== Competition format ==
The competition starts with a qualifying round where a time trial basis will be between the 11 pairs; all 11 pairs will be divided into 6 heats, all heats having 2 pairs except heat 1 which will have 1 pair. The 2 fastest pairs in the qualifying would qualify to the gold medal final while the 3rd and 4th fastest will qualify to the bronze medal final where they will race head-to-head. The distance of this event is 3000m. The medal finals are also held on the same day as the qualifying.

== Schedule ==
All times are Central European Summer Time (UTC+2)

Date	Time	Round
1 September	11:26	Qualifying
1 September	14:31	Finals

== Results ==
=== Qualifying ===
Rank	Heat	Cyclist	Nationality	Result	Notes
1	4	Sophie Unwin; Pilot: Jenny Holl	Great Britain	3:17.643	QG, WR
2	5	Katie-George Dunlevy; Pilot: Eve McCrystal	Ireland	3:20.481	QG
3	5	Lora Fachie; Pilot: Corrine Hall	Great Britain	3:22.390	QB
4	6	Elizabeth Jordan; Pilot: Dannielle Khan	Great Britain	3:23.192	QB
5	4	Josephine Healion; Pilot: Linda Kelly	Ireland	3:27.425	
6	3	Hannah Chadwick; Pilot: Skyler Espinoza	United States	3:40.529	
7	2	Jessica Gallagher; Pilot: Caitlin Ward	Australia	3:46.294	
8	3	Nur Azlia Syafinaz Mohd Zais; Pilot: Nurul Suhada Zainal	Malaysia	3:49.029	
9	1	Watcharobon Boonmalert; Pilot: Kanyarat Kesthonglang	Thailand	3:56.599	
10	2	María José Quiroga; Pilot: Micaela Barroso	Argentina	3:58.786	
	6	Anne-Sophie Centis; Pilot: Élise Delzenne	France	DSQ	

=== Finals ===
Rank	Cyclists	Nation	Result	Notes
Gold medal final
1st place, gold medalist(s)	Sophie Unwin; Pilot: Jenny Holl	Great Britain	3:19.149	
2nd place, silver medalist(s)	Katie-George Dunlevy; Pilot: Eve McCrystal	Ireland	3:21.315	
Bronze medal final
3rd place, bronze medalist(s)	Lora Fachie; Pilot: Corrine Hall	Great Britain	3:20.488	
4	Elizabeth Jordan; Pilot: Dannielle Khan	Great Britain	3:25.430	
