= Cycling at the 2016 Summer Paralympics – Women's road time trial B =

Cycling, Women's road time trial B at the XV Paralympic Games
- Venue: Flamengo Park
- Dates: 14 September
- Competitors: 14

Medalists
1st place, gold medalist(s)		Katie-George Dunlevy; Guide : Eve McCrystal	Ireland
2nd place, silver medalist(s)		Yurie Kanuma; Guide : Mai Tanaka	Japan
3rd place, bronze medalist(s)		Lora Turnham; Guide : Corrine Hall	Great Britain

The Women's time trial B road cycling event at the 2016 Summer Paralympics took place on the afternoon of 14 September at Flamengo Park, Pontal. 14 riders (with pilots) competed over two laps of a fifteen kilometre course.

The B category is for cyclists with visual impairment. Sighted guides act as pilots in these events, which take place on tandem bikes.

== Results ==
Women's road time trial B. 14 September 2016, Rio.

Rank	Rider Guide	Nationality	Time	Deficit	Avg. speed
1	Katie-George Dunlevy; Guide : Eve McCrystal	Ireland	38:59.22	0	46.169
2	Yurie Kanuma; Guide : Mai Tanaka	Japan	39:32.92	33.7	45.514
3	Lora Turnham; Guide : Corrine Hall	Great Britain	39:33.81	34.59	45.496
4	Emma Foy; Guide : Laura Thompson	New Zealand	39:45.87	46.65	45.267
5	Iwona Podkościelna; Guide : Aleksandra Tecław	Poland	39:54.45	55.23	45.104
6	Shawn Cheshire; Guide : Mackenzie Woodring	United States	41:07.76	02:08.54	43.764
7	Robbi Weldon; Guide : Audrey Lemieux	Canada	41:38.98	02:39.76	43.218
8	Odette Van Deudekom; Guide : Kim van Dijk	Netherlands	42:04.84	03:05.62	42.775
9	Amanda Cameron; Guide : Hannah Van Kampen	New Zealand	42:29.93	03:30.71	42.354
10	Guzman Benitez; Guide : Beatriu Josefa Gomez Franquet	Spain	42:32.37	03:33.15	42.314
11	Larissa Klaassen; Guide : Haliegh Dolman	Netherlands	42:35.92	03:36.70	42.255
12	Adamantia Chalkiadaki; Guide : Argyro Milaki	Greece	43:03.79	04:04.57	41.799
13	Shawna Ryan; Guide : Joanie Caron	Canada	43:04.33	04:05.11	41.79
14	Anna Duzikowska; Guide : Natalia Morytko	Poland	43:28.31	04:29.09	41.406
15	Griet Hoet; Guide : Anneleen Monsieur	Belgium	43:34.20	04:34.58	41.313
