= Philip Jönsson =

Swedish Paralympic sport shooter

Personal information
- Born: 28 March 1994 (age 31); Mariestad, Sweden

Sport
- Country: Sweden
- Sport: Shooting para sport
- Disability class: SH2

Philip Jönsson (born 28 March 1994) is a Swedish Paralympic sport shooter. He won the gold medal in the mixed 10m air rifle standing SH2 event at the 2020 Summer Paralympics held in Tokyo, Japan. This was also the first medal for Sweden at the 2020 Summer Paralympics.

Jönsson also represented Sweden at the 2016 Summer Paralympics held in Rio de Janeiro, Brazil where he qualified for two finals, finishing 8th in both. He was nominated for Newcomer of the Year at the Swedish Parasport Awards.
