= Yurie Kanuma =

Japanese biathlete, cross-country skier and cyclist (born 1981)

Personal information
- Nationality: Japanese
- Born: May 20, 1981 (age 45) Machida, Tokyo, Japan

Sport
- Sport: Para-cycling; Paralympic biathlon; Paralympic cross-country skiing
Medal record
Women's Para-cycling
Representing Japan
Summer Paralympics
Silver medal – second place	2016 Rio de Janeiro	Road time trial B
Track World Championships
Silver medal – second place	2016 Montichiari	Tandem B pursuit

Yurie Kanuma (鹿沼 由理恵, Kanuma Yurie; born May 20, 1981) is a Japanese former biathlete, cross-country skier and cyclist. She represented Japan at the 2010 Winter Paralympics and the 2016 Summer Paralympics. As a cyclist, she competed in para-cycling tandem road and track events.

== Early life and education ==
Kanuma was born on May 20, 1981, and is originally from Machida, Tokyo. She was born with visual impairment (low-vision). She graduated from Tokyo Metropolitan Bunkyo School for the Blind.

== Sporting career ==
At the age of 25, Kanuma discovered Nordic skiing (cross-country) and began competing in earnest in 2008. At the 2010 Winter Paralympics, she finished 5th in the 3 x 2.5 km relay event. She then switched to cycling.

In 2016, Kanuma was selected as a representative for the 2016 Summer Paralympics, but before the start of the competition, she gradually lost feeling in her arm and developed peripheral nerve paralysis. However, she was told that "if she received treatment, she would no longer be able to represent Japan," so she took painkillers and participated in the Paralympics. At that Paralympics, she participated in the women's road time trial B with pilot Mai Tanaka and won a silver medal. In recognition of her achievement, she was awarded the Machida City Citizen's Honor Award in the same year. Her left arm was subsequently amputated in 2018.

Kanuma served as a torchbearer for the 2020 Summer Olympics, running in Tokyo on July 9, 2021.
