= Larissa Klaassen =

Dutch Paralympic cyclist

Personal information
- Born: 7 May 1994 (age 32) Den Helder, Netherlands

Sport
- Country: Netherlands
- Sport: Para-cycling
- Disability: Vision impairment
Medal record
Para-cycling
Representing Netherlands
Paralympic Games
Gold medal – first place	2020 Tokyo	Time trial B
Silver medal – second place	2016 Rio de Janeiro	Time trial B

Larissa Klaassen (born 7 May 1994) is a visually impaired Dutch Paralympic cyclist. Klaassen and sighted pilot Imke Brommer won the gold medal in the women's time trial B event at the 2020 Summer Paralympics held in Tokyo, Japan. She also set a new Paralympic record of 1:05.291.

She represented the Netherlands at the 2016 Summer Paralympics in Rio de Janeiro, Brazil. Together with sighted pilot Haliegh Dolman she won the silver medal in the women's 1 km time trial B event.

Klaassen and Dolman also competed in the women's road time trial B where they finished in 11th place. They also competed in the women's road race B and they did not finish in that event.

At the 2016 UCI Para-cycling Track World Championships held in Montichiari, Italy, Dolman and Klaassen won the gold medal in the women's 1 km time trial. They also won the bronze medal in the women's sprint event.

At the 2019 UCI Para-cycling Track World Championships held in Apeldoorn, Netherlands, Klaassen and her sighted pilot Imke Brommer won the silver medal in the women's time trial 500m B event and the bronze medal in the women's sprint B event.
