= Justyna Kiryła =

Polish Paralympic cyclist

Personal information
- Born: 11 October 1995 (age 30) Lublin, Poland

Sport
- Sport: Para cycling
Medal record
Representing Poland
World Road Championships
| Bronze medal – third place | 2019 Emmen | Road race B |
European Para Championships
| Gold medal – first place | 2023 Rotterdam | Road race B |

Justyna Kiryła (born 11 October 1995) is a Polish Paralympic cyclist who competes in international cycling competitions. She is a World bronze medalist and European champion in road cycling. She competed at the 2020 Summer Paralympics where she finished fourth in the road race.
