= Jenny Holl =

Scottish cyclist (born 1999)

Jenny Holl MBE
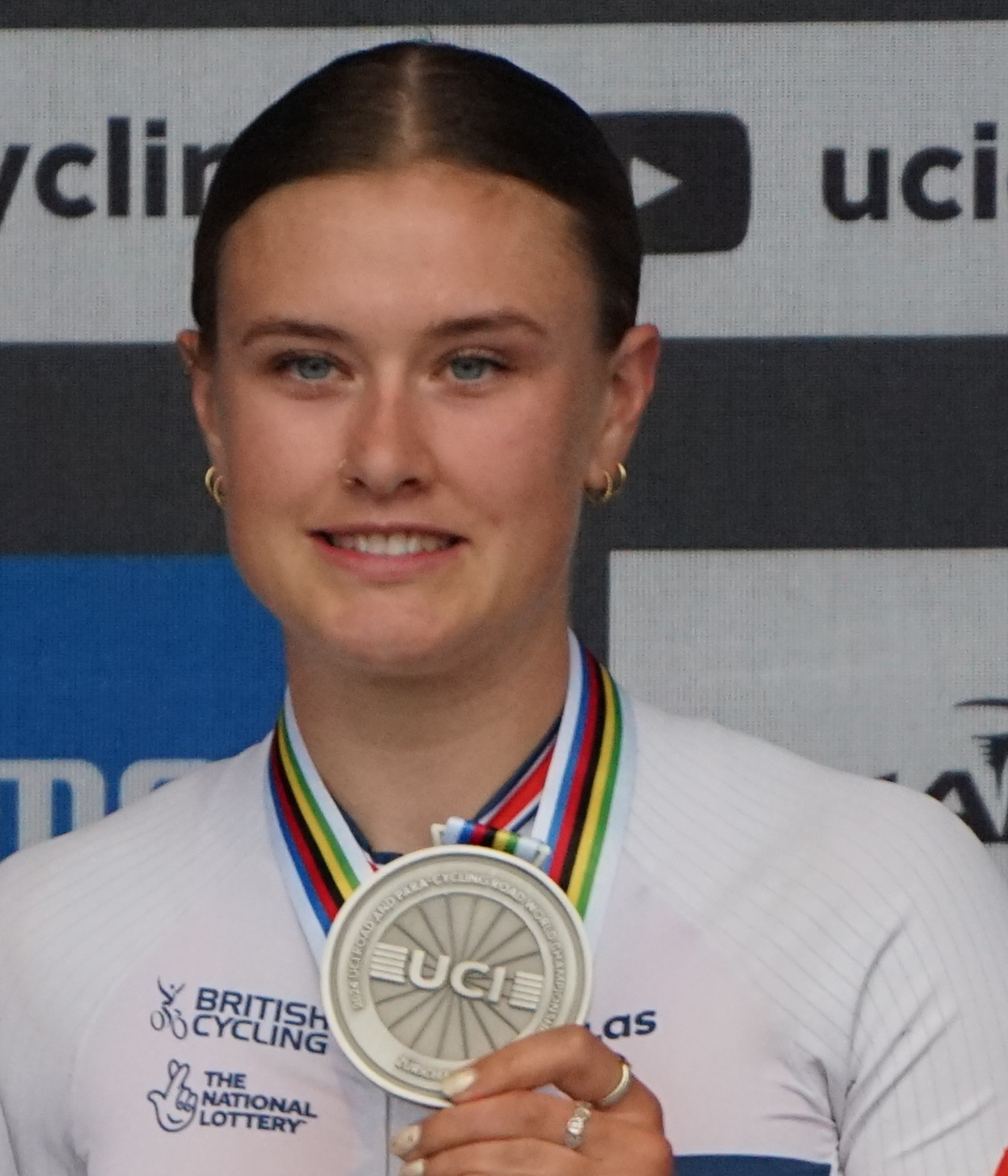
- Holl at the 2024 UCI Para-cycling Road World Championships

Personal information
- Full name: Jennifer Anne Holl
- Born: 13 September 1999 (age 27) Stirling, Scotland

Cycling career
- Sport: Cycling
- Disciplines: Track, road
- Role: Rider
Medal record
Representing Great Britain
Women's track cycling
European Games
Silver medal – second place	2019 Minsk	Team pursuit
Women's para cycling
Paralympic Games
Gold medal – first place	2024 Paris	Ind. pursuit B
Gold medal – first place	2024 Paris	Road race B
Silver medal – second place	2020 Tokyo	Road race B
Silver medal – second place	2024 Paris	Road time trial B
Bronze medal – third place	2020 Tokyo	Ind. pursuit B
Bronze medal – third place	2024 Paris	Time trial B
Road World Championships
Gold medal – first place	2021 Cascais	Road race B
Gold medal – first place	2022 Baie-Comeau	Time trial B
Silver medal – second place	2022 Baie-Comeau	Road race B
Silver medal – second place	2023 Glasgow	Time trial B
Silver medal – second place	2024 Zurich	Time trial B
Silver medal – second place	2024 Zurich	Road race B
Bronze medal – third place	2023 Glasgow	Road race B
Track World Championships
Gold medal – first place	2022 Saint-Quentin-en-Yvelines	Ind. pursuit B
Gold medal – first place	2023 Glasgow	Sprint B
Gold medal – first place	2023 Glasgow	Time trial B
Gold medal – first place	2023 Glasgow	Ind. pursuit B
Gold medal – first place	2025 Rio de Janeiro	Pursuit B
Silver medal – second place	2024 Rio de Janeiro	Time trial B
Silver medal – second place	2024 Rio de Janeiro	Sprint B
Silver medal – second place	2024 Rio de Janeiro	Ind. pursuit B
Silver medal – second place	2026 Apeldoorn	Time trial B
Silver medal – second place	2026 Apeldoorn	Pursuit B
Bronze medal – third place	2022 Saint-Quentin-en-Yvelines	Sprint B
Bronze medal – third place	2022 Saint-Quentin-en-Yvelines	Time trial B
Bronze medal – third place	2025 Rio de Janeiro	Sprint B

Jennifer Anne Holl (born 13 September 1999) is a Scottish professional racing cyclist. Originally from Scotland, Holl moved to Manchester in 2017.

== Career ==
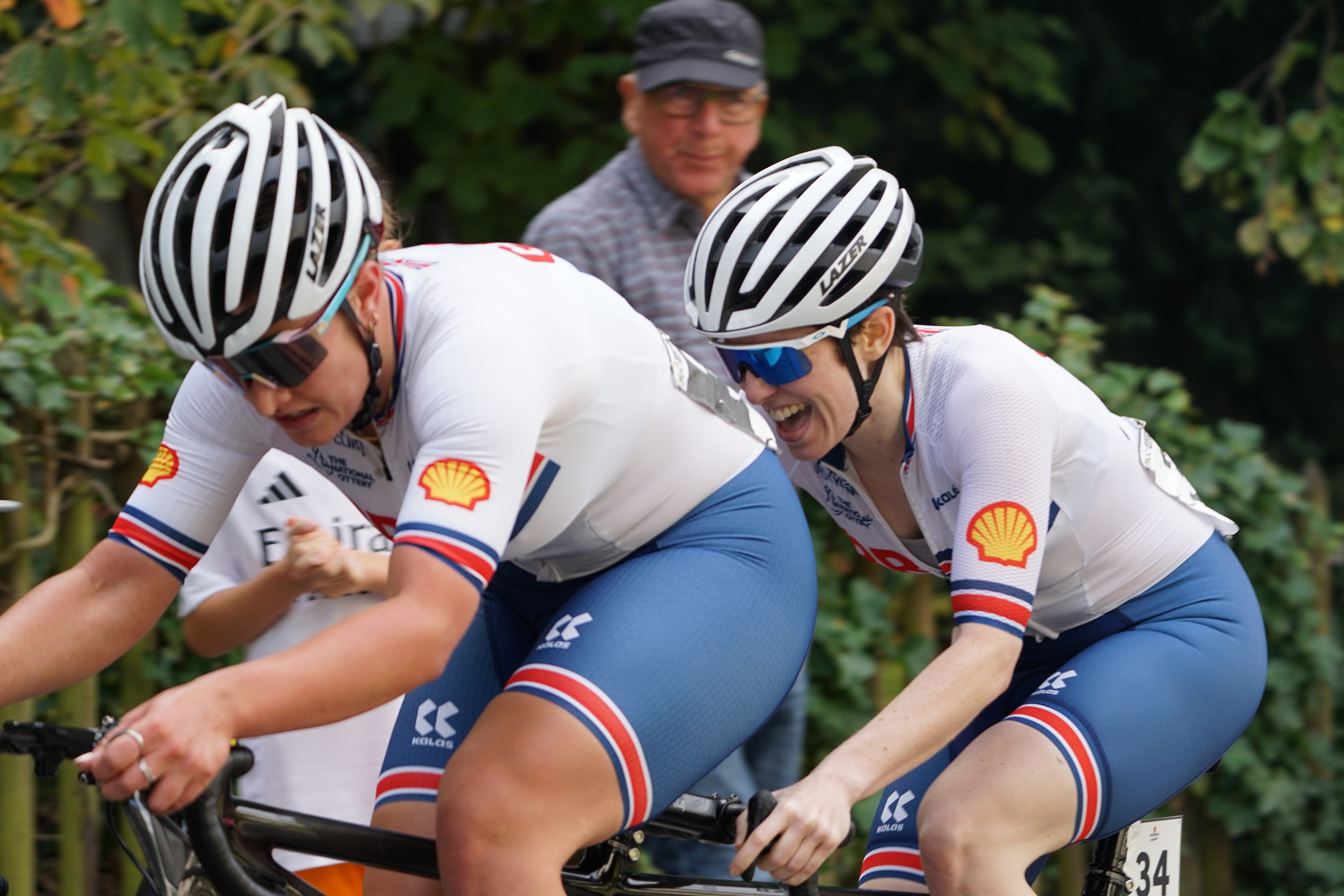
Holl (left) piloting Sophie Unwin (right) at the 2024 Road World Championships.

In January 2018, Holl became Scotland's youngest national champion, at the British Track Cycling Championships. In June 2019, at the European Games in Minsk, Holl won a silver medal in the team pursuit event.

Holl became a para-cycling sighted pilot for Sophie Unwin in March 2021 after coming to the end of her time with the Great Britain Senior Academy.

Just four months after first partnering with Unwin, the pair were selected as members of the ParalympicsGB cycling squad for the Tokyo 2020 Paralympic Games. Holl won the bronze medal in the individual pursuit on the track at the 2020 Summer Paralympics alongside Unwin, before taking silver in the road race B.

At the 2024 British Cycling National Track Championships, she won both the Scratch and Points national titles.

On 22 July 2024 it was announced that Holl had been selected for the British team ahead of the 2024 Paralympic Games in Paris, her second Games, as a pilot for Sophie Unwin. Together they competed in both road and track cycling disciplines, and medalled in all four of their events. The first of these medals, a bronze, came on 30 August in the women's 1000 m time trial B. A second medal, the duo's first Paralympic gold, came two days later in the women's 3000 m pursuit B. In the road time trial B on 4 September they claimed silver, beating fellow British pairing Lora Fachie and Corrine Hall, who won bronze. Holl and Unwin won a second gold medal of the Games in the women's road race B on 6 September.

Holl was appointed Member of the Order of the British Empire (MBE) in the 2025 New Year Honours for services to cycling.

== Major results ==
2018
National Track Championships

1st Team pursuit

2019
National Track Championships

1st Team pursuit

2021
Paralympic Games

2nd Road race B
3rd Individual pursuit B

2023
Para-cycling Road World Championships

2nd Time trial B
3rd Road race B

2024
National Track Championships

1st Scratch
1st Points

Paralympic Games

1st Individual pursuit B
1st Road race B
2nd Road time trial B
3rd Time trial B

Para-cycling Track World Championships

2nd Time trial B
2nd Sprint B
2nd Individual pursuit B

Para-cycling Road World Championships

2nd Time trial B
2nd Road race B
