= Dannielle Khan =

English cyclist (born 1995)

Dannielle Khan MBE
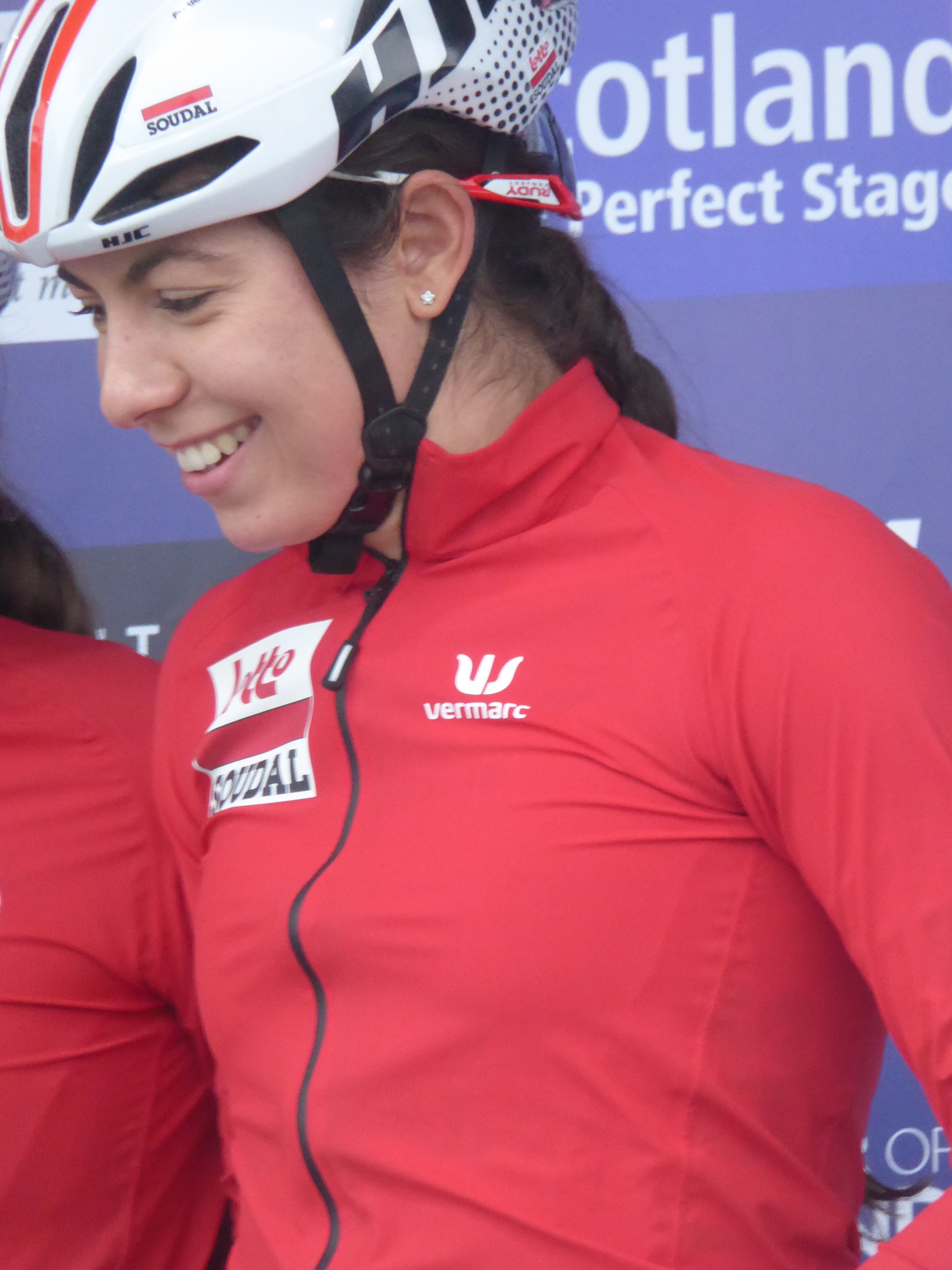
- Khan at the 2019 Women's Tour of Scotland

Personal information
- Full name: Dannielle Jade Elizabeth Khan
- Nickname: Danni
- Born: 1 September 1995 (age 31) Solihull, West Midlands, England
- Height: 5 ft 8 in (173 cm)

Cycling career
- Sport: Cycling
- Current team: Simpson Nouvelles
- Disciplines: Track; Road
- Role: Rider
- Rider type: Endurance (track)

Amateur teams
- 2009–2016: Solihull CC
- 2016–2018: Team Breeze
- 2020–2021: ILLI Bikes
- 2022: Bianchi Hunt Morvelo
- 2023: Saint Piran WRT
- 2024–: Nouvelles Cycling x Prendas

Professional team
- 2019: Lotto–Soudal Ladies
Medal record
Representing Great Britain
Women's track cycling
European Championships
Bronze medal – third place	2016 Yvelines	Team pursuit
Women's para-cycling
Paralympic Games
Gold medal – first place	2024 Paris	Time trial B
Track World Championships
Gold medal – first place	2024 Rio de Janeiro	Time trial B
Gold medal – first place	2024 Rio de Janeiro	Sprint B
Gold medal – first place	2024 Rio de Janeiro	Individual pursuit B
Gold medal – first place	2025 Rio de Janeiro	Time trial B
Gold medal – first place	2025 Rio de Janeiro	Sprint B
Bronze medal – third place	2025 Rio de Janeiro	Individual pursuit B

Dannielle Jade Elizabeth Khan (born 1 September 1995) is an English racing cyclist, who rides for British amateur team Simpson Nouvelles. She won the sprint and 500m TT events at the 2013 UCI Juniors Track World Championships, as well as the silver medal in the Keirin.

In 2024, having sat out the obligatory international waiting period, she made the switch to para-cycling, riding as a sighted tandem pilot for Elizabeth Jordan in the B classification for visually impaired cyclists. In the same year, Khan and Jordan won gold medals at both the UCI Para-cycling Track World Championships and the Paralympic Games.

== Career ==
Born in Solihull, Khan started her sporting life in short-track speed skating, and was encouraged to try cycling as part of her off season conditioning. She quickly found success on the velodrome and became a member of British Cycling's Olympic Development Programme in 2012.

In August 2013, at the Sir Chris Hoy Velodrome in Glasgow, Khan represented Great Britain at the UCI Juniors Track World Championships. She was featured in the documentary film Bicycle with her family.

In January 2016 Khan was announced as a member of Team Breeze, British Cycling's women's development squad.

In October 2016 Khan traveled to Paris to race in her first European Track Championships where she was part of the bronze medal-winning team pursuit squad.

Khan was appointed a Member of the Order of the British Empire (MBE) in the 2025 New Year Honours for services to cycling.

At the 2025 UCI Para-cycling Track World Championships, Khan piloted Elizabeth Jordan to gold medals in the Women’s B 1 km Time Trial and the Women’s B Sprint, with the pair qualifying fastest in the Sprint at 11.065 s and defeating Australia in two straight rides to defend their world title. Khan and Jordan also recorded a time of 1:06.796 in the Time Trial to secure the gold, as documented by the governing body.

== Personal life ==
Khan's younger sister Daisy, is also a cyclist. She is of Pakistani and English descent.

== Major results ==
2011
National Youth Track Championships

1st Sprint
1st 500m time trial
3rd Scratch

2012
National Junior Track Championships

1st Sprint
3rd 500m time trial
3rd Scratch

2nd Team sprint, UEC European Junior Track Championships (with Lucy Garner)
3rd 500m time trial, National Track Championships
2013
UCI Juniors Track World Championships

1st Sprint
1st 500m time trial
2nd Keirin

National Junior Track Championships

1st Sprint
3rd 500m time trial

1st Team sprint, Ghent International Junior Track Meeting (with Hannah Blount)
Revolution Series

1st Keirin – Round 1, Manchester
2nd Sprint – Round 2, Glasgow
3rd Sprint – Round 1, Manchester

3rd 500m time trial, National Track Championships
2014
National Track Championships

1st Team sprint (with Jessica Varnish)
2nd Keirin

Revolution Series

1st Keirin – Round 3, Manchester
2nd Sprint – Round 3, Manchester
3rd Keirin – Round 4, Manchester

2nd Sprint, Dudenhofen
Oberhausen

3rd Keirin
3rd Sprint

3rd Team sprint, UCI Track Cycling World Cup, Guadalajara (with Victoria Williamson)
2015
2nd Keirin, Fastest Man on Wheels
Revolution Series – Round 1, Derby

3rd Keirin
3rd 500m time trial

2016
UEC European Under-23 Track Championships

1st Team pursuit
3rd Scratch

1st Team pursuit, UCI Track Cycling World Cup, Glasgow
3rd Team pursuit, UEC European Track Championships
3rd Scratch, Revolution – Round 1, Manchester
2017
National Track Championships

1st 500 m time trial
3rd Team pursuit (with Neah Evans, Katie Prankerd and Sarah Storey)

2023
2nd Omnium, National Track Championships
7th Overall Endurance UCI Track Champions League

1st Scratch, London I

2024
1st Time trial B, Paralympic Games (with Lizzi Jordan)
UCI World Championships

1st Time trial B (with Lizzi Jordan)
1st Sprint B (with Lizzi Jordan)
1st Individual pursuit B (with Lizzi Jordan)
