= Sophie Unwin =

English cyclist (born 1994)

Sophie Unwin MBE
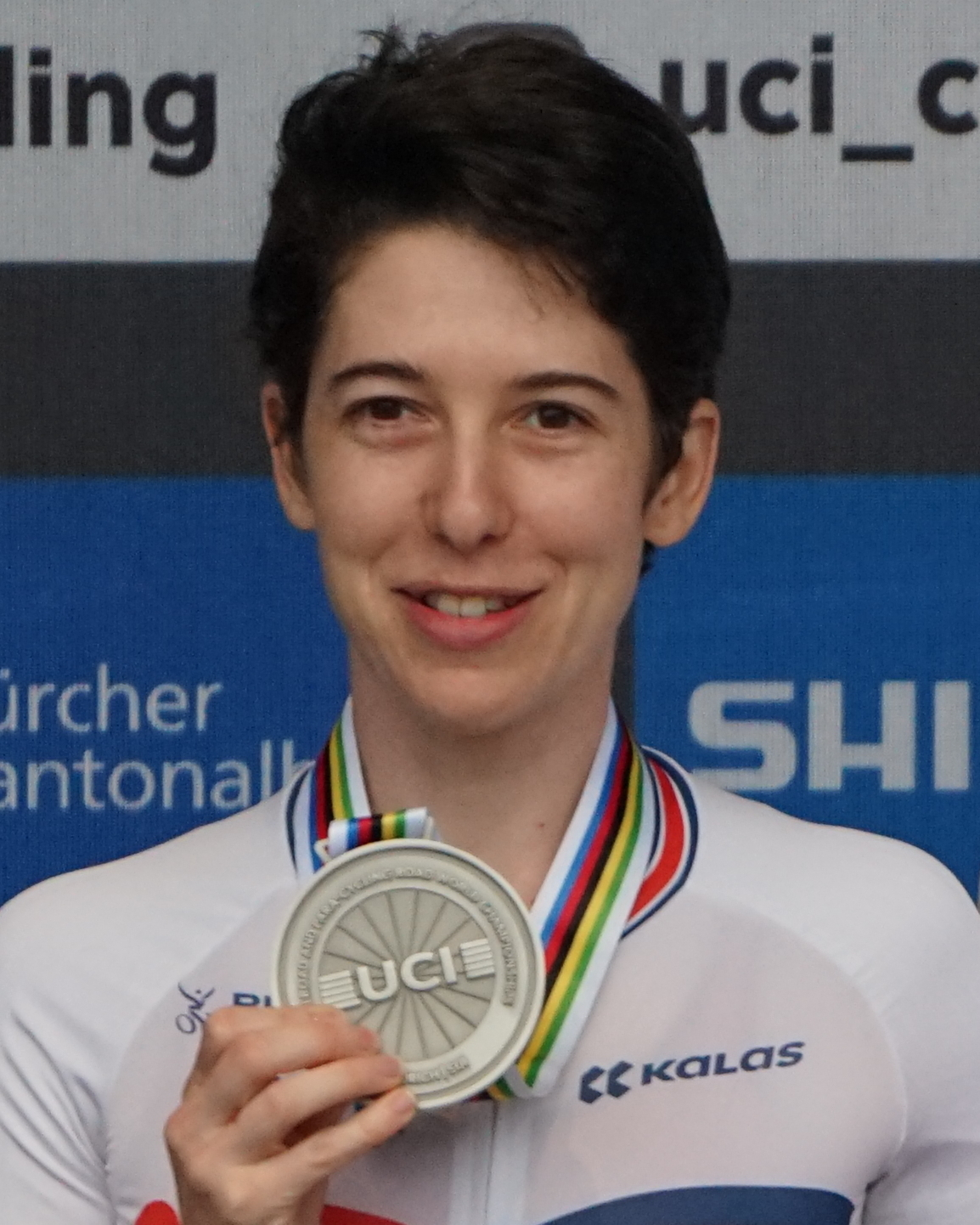
- Unwin at the 2024 UCI Para-cycling Road World Championships

Personal information
- Born: Sophie Beth Unwin; 23 July 1994 (age 32)

Cycling career
- Sport: Cycling
- Disciplines: Track, Road
Medal record
Women's para cycling
Representing Great Britain
Paralympic Games
| Gold medal – first place | 2024 Paris | Ind. pursuit B |
| Gold medal – first place | 2024 Paris | Road race B |
| Silver medal – second place | 2020 Tokyo | Road Race B |
| Silver medal – second place | 2024 Paris | Road time trial B |
| Bronze medal – third place | 2020 Tokyo | Ind. pursuit B |
| Bronze medal – third place | 2024 Paris | Time trial B |
Road World Championships
| Gold medal – first place | 2021 Cascais | Road race B |
| Gold medal – first place | 2022 Baie-Comeau | Time trial B |
| Gold medal – first place | 2026 Huntsville | Road race B |
| Silver medal – second place | 2022 Baie-Comeau | Road race B |
| Silver medal – second place | 2023 Glasgow | Time trial B |
| Silver medal – second place | 2024 Zurich | Time trial B |
| Silver medal – second place | 2024 Zurich | Road race B |
| Silver medal – second place | 2025 Ronse | Time trial B |
| Bronze medal – third place | 2023 Glasgow | Road race B |
| Bronze medal – third place | 2025 Ronse | Road race B |
| Bronze medal – third place | 2026 Huntsville | Time trial B |
Track World Championships
| Gold medal – first place | 2022 Saint-Quentin-en-Yvelines | Pursuit B |
| Gold medal – first place | 2023 Glasgow | Tandem time trial B |
| Gold medal – first place | 2023 Glasgow | Pursuit B |
| Gold medal – first place | 2023 Glasgow | Sprint B |
| Gold medal – first place | 2025 Rio de Janeiro | Pursuit B |
| Gold medal – first place | 2026 Apeldoorn | Sprint B |
| Silver medal – second place | 2024 Rio de Janeiro | Time trial B |
| Silver medal – second place | 2024 Rio de Janeiro | Pursuit B |
| Silver medal – second place | 2024 Rio de Janeiro | Sprint B |
| Silver medal – second place | 2026 Apeldoorn | Time trial B |
| Silver medal – second place | 2026 Apeldoorn | Pursuit B |
| Bronze medal – third place | 2022 Saint-Quentin-en-Yvelines | Time trial B |
| Bronze medal – third place | 2022 Saint-Quentin-en-Yvelines | Sprint B |
| Bronze medal – third place | 2025 Rio de Janeiro | Sprint B |

Sophie Beth Unwin (born 23 July 1994) is an English racing cyclist who competes in para-cycling tandem road and track events as a visually impaired athlete. She represented Great Britain at the 2020 and 2024 Summer Paralympics.

== Career ==
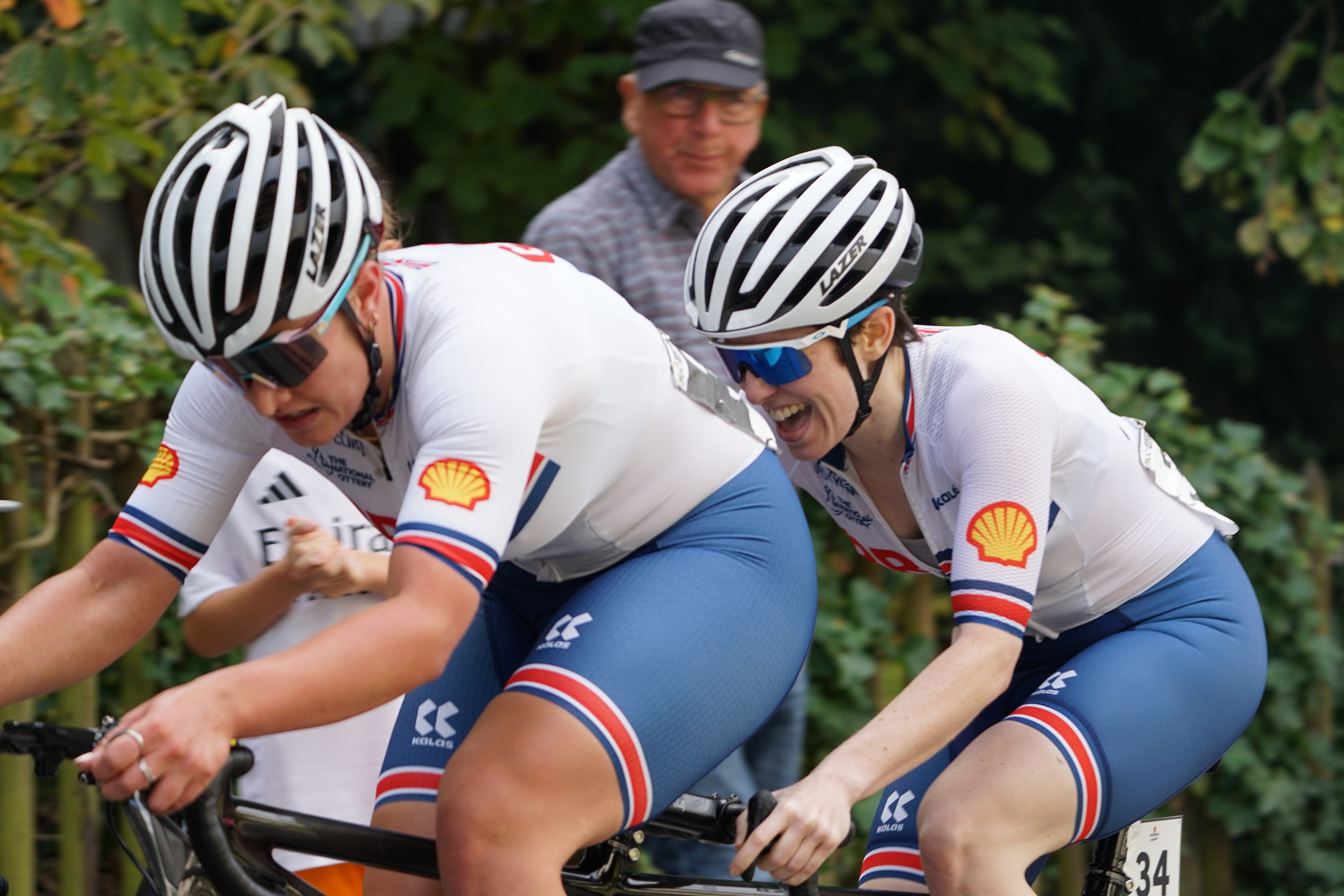
Unwin (right) and her pilot Jenny Holl (left) at the 2024 Road World Championships.

Unwin began paracycling after attending an open talent event in August 2020. She won the bronze medal in the individual pursuit at the 2020 Summer Paralympics alongside Jenny Holl. She also partnered with Holl to claim silver in the women's road race B event during the 2020 Summer Paralympics.

They won the gold medal in the tandem B time trial at the 2021 UCI Para-cycling Road World Championships.

She represented England at the 2022 Commonwealth Games and competed in the women's tandem event. She finished third in the competition however, no bronze medal was awarded as the minimum five entries did not compete, after a late withdrawal from the fifth entered team. This prompted Unwin to protest against the decision to not award her a bronze medal despite finishing third. She along with her pilot Georgia Holt attempted to stand behind the podium ceremony with the flag of England before being escorted/moved by a security staff member and as a result Unwin was subsequently fined for breaching the code of conduct and she left the scene with tears.

On 22 July 2024 it was announced that Unwin had been selected for the British team for the 2024 Paralympic Games in Paris, her second Games. She competed in both road and track cycling disciplines and medalled in all four of her events, all piloted by Jenny Holl. The first of these medals, a bronze, came on 30 August in the women's 1000 m time trial B. A second medal, her first Paralympic gold, came two days later in the women's 3000 m pursuit B. In the road time trial B on 4 September she claimed silver, beating fellow British pairing Lora Fachie and Corrine Hall, who won bronze. Unwin won a second gold medal of the Games in the women's road race B.

Unwin was appointed Member of the Order of the British Empire (MBE) in the 2025 New Year Honours for services to cycling.
