= Louise Jannering =

Swedish paracyclist

Personal information
- Born: 8 July 1997 (age 29) Gustavsberg, Sweden

Cycling career
- Sport: Cycling
- Disciplines: Track, Road
- Role: Stoker
Medal record
Women's para cycling
Representing Sweden
Paralympic Games
| Bronze medal – third place | 2020 Tokyo | Time trial B |
| Bronze medal – third place | 2020 Tokyo | Road race B |
Road World Championships
| Bronze medal – third place | 2022 Baie-Comeau | Time trial B |

Louise Jannering (born 8 July 1997) is a visually impaired Swedish racing cyclist who competes in para-cycling tandem road and track events. She competed at the 2020 Summer Paralympics, winning a bronze medal in Women's Time trial
