= Griet Hoet =

Belgian Paralympic cyclist

Personal information
- Full name: Griet Hoet
- Born: 12 June 1978 (age 48) Ghent, Flanders, Belgium

Cycling career
- Sport: Cycling
Medal record
Para-cycling
Representing Belgium
Paralympic Games
Bronze medal – third place	2020 Tokyo	Time trial B
Track World Championships
Gold medal – first place	2022 Saint-Quentin-en-Yvelines	Time trial B

Griet Hoet (born 12 June 1978) is a Belgian para-cyclist, who won bronze in the women's time trial B at the 2020 Summer Paralympics held in Tokyo, Japan. She also represented Belgium at the 2016 Summer Paralympics held in Rio de Janeiro, Brazil where she and her pilot Anneleen Monsieur finished 8th in the Women's individual pursuit B, 14th in the Women's road race B and 15th in the Women's road time trial B.
