= Katie-George Dunlevy =

English-born Irish cyclist and rower

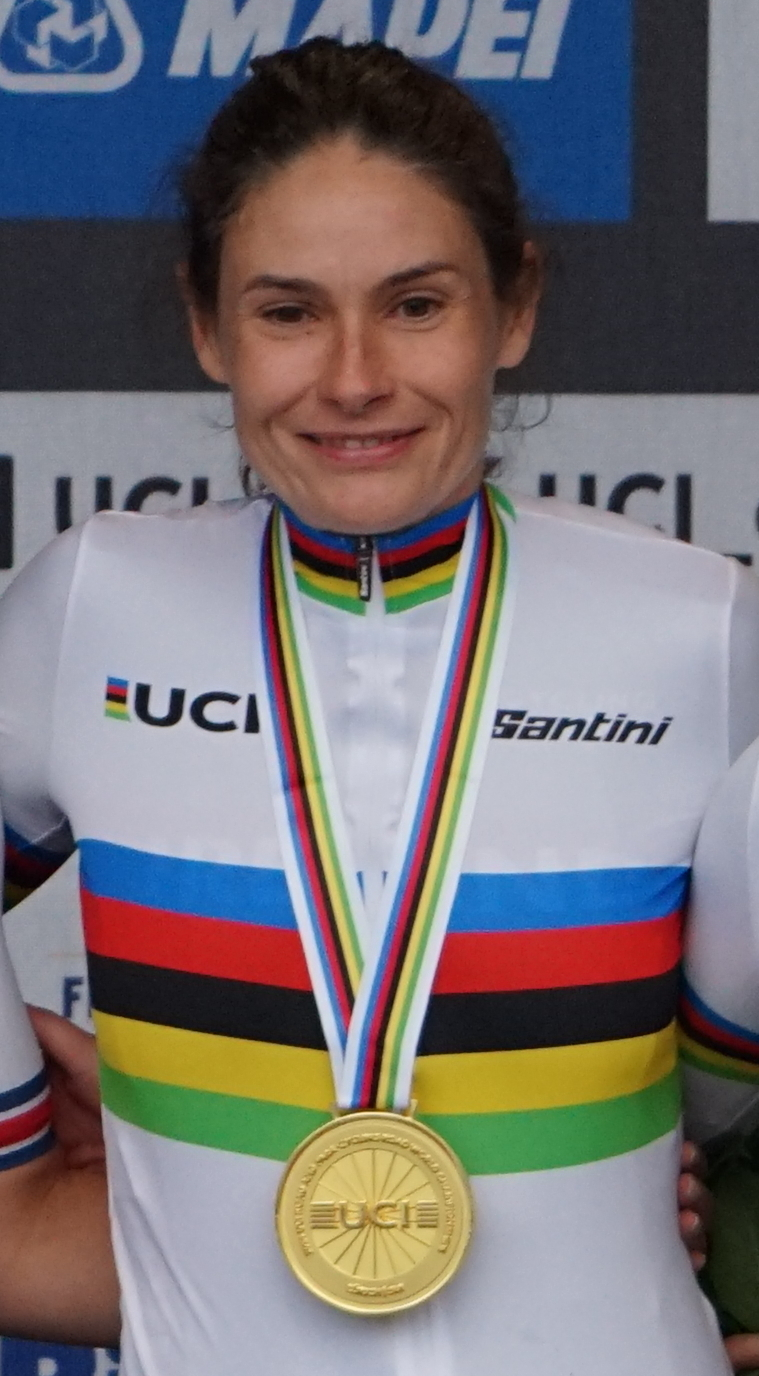
- Dunlevy at the 2024 UCI Para-cycling Road World Championships

Personal information
- Nationality: British; Irish
- Born: 26 November 1981 (age 44) Crawley, West Sussex, United Kingdom

Sport
- Country: Ireland
- Sport: Para-cycling
- Disability class: B
- Events: Tandem time trial, Tandem road race, Tandem individual pursuit
Medal record
Representing Ireland
Women's Para-cycling
Paralympic Games
Gold medal – first place	2016 Rio de Janeiro	Time trial B
Gold medal – first place	2020 Tokyo	Time trial B
Gold medal – first place	2020 Tokyo	Road race B
Gold medal – first place	2024 Paris	Time trial B
Silver medal – second place	2016 Rio de Janeiro	Road race B
Silver medal – second place	2020 Tokyo	Ind. pursuit B
Silver medal – second place	2024 Paris	Ind. pursuit B
Silver medal – second place	2024 Paris	Road race B
Road World Championships
Gold medal – first place	2017 South Africa	time trial (B)
Gold medal – first place	2017 South Africa	road race (B)
Gold medal – first place	2018 Italy	time trial (B)
Gold medal – first place	2018 Italy	road race (B)
Gold medal – first place	2019 Netherlands	time trial (B)
Gold medal – first place	2022 Baie-Comeau	road race (B)
Gold medal – first place	2023 Glasgow	time trial (B)
Gold medal – first place	2023 Glasgow	road race (B)
Gold medal – first place	2024 Zurich	time trial (B)
Gold medal – first place	2024 Zurich	road race (B)
Gold medal – first place	2025 Ronse	Time trial (B)
Gold medal – first place	2025 Ronse	Road race (B)
Silver medal – second place	2014 Greenville	road race (B)
Silver medal – second place	2019 Netherlands	road race (B)
Silver medal – second place	2021 Cascais	time trial (B)
Silver medal – second place	2021 Cascais	road race (B)
Silver medal – second place	2022 Baie-Comeau	time trial (B)
Track World Championships
Silver medal – second place	2020 Canada	3km pursuit (B)
Bronze medal – third place	2015 Netherlands	3km pursuit (B)
Bronze medal – third place	2018 Rio de Janeiro	3km pursuit (B)
Bronze medal – third place	2023 Glasgow	Tandem pursuit (B)
Bronze medal – third place	2026 Apeldoorn	Tandem pursuit (B)
Road European Championships
Gold medal – first place	2026 Maniago	Time Trial
Bronze medal – third place	2026 Maniago	Road Race
Representing Great Britain
Women's para-rowing
World Rowing Championships
Gold medal – first place	2004 Banyoles	LTAMix4+
Gold medal – first place	2005 Gifu	LTAMix4+

Katie-George Dunlevy (born 26 November 1981) is an English-born para-cyclist competing in tandem events for Ireland, and formerly a pararowing competitor for Great Britain in the 4+ Mixed LTA class.

== Career ==
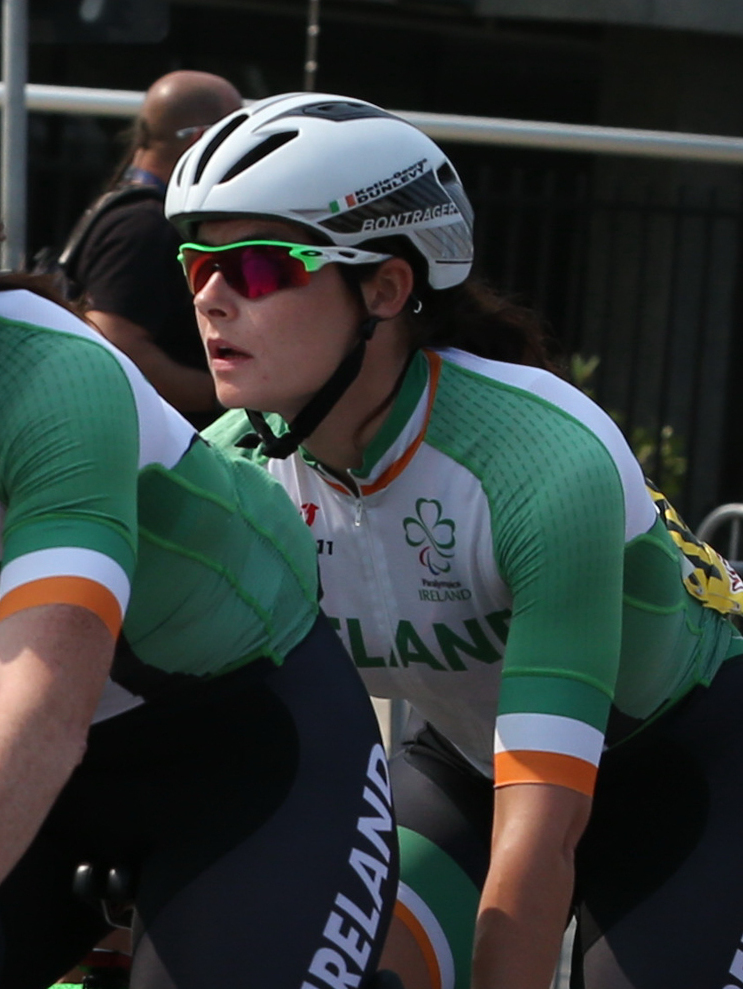
Dunlevy at the 2016 Summer Paralympics.

Dunlevy won a gold medal at the time trial B event and silver in the road race at the 2016 Summer Paralympics with pilot Eve McCrystal.

A multiple World medalist along with McCrystal. In 2014 Dunlevy and McCrystal won their first World Championship medal, a silver medal in the road race. In 2015 the pair won Bronze in the 3k pursuit at the UCI Para-Cycling Track World Championships in Apeldorm, Netherlands. She became double World Champion at the UCI Para-cycling Road World Championships in September 2017 in Pietermaritzburg, South Africa. A year later in 2018 in Maniago, Italy she retained both titles becoming double World Champion again with McCrystal. In the same year she won Bronze in the 3k pursuit at the UCI Para-Cycling Track World Championships.

In 2019 she won Gold in the time trial at the UCI Para-Cycling Road World Championships in Emmen, Netherlands becoming world champion for the third time and won Silver in the road race. Dunlevy won the B Women's (Tandem) event in the 108 km road race at the Yorkshire 2019 Para-Cycling International with pilot Eve McCrystal in a time of 02:36:57.

In January 2020 Dunlevy and McCrystal won Silver at the UCI Para-Cycling track World Championships in the 3k pursuit.

After 17 months without competition, in June 2021 at the UCI Para-Cycling Road World Championships in Estoril, Portugal, Dunlevy and McCrystal won double Silver in the time trial and road race.

In 2021 the pair won a silver medal at the delayed 2020 Summer Paralympics in the individual pursuit event. On the road events a couple of days later they retained their title from Rio in the time trial winning Gold and also won Gold in the road race becoming the most successful Irish female Paralympian.

== Personal life ==
Dunlevy was diagnosed with retinitis pigmentosa (RP) aged 11 and is registered blind. She previously competed in athletics, rowing and swimming before taking up cycling in 2011. She competes for Ireland as her father is a native of Mountcharles, County Donegal. She has five sisters. She is a lesbian.
