= Lora Fachie =

English racing cyclist (born 1988)

Lora Fachie OBE
Personal information
- Born: Lora Marie Turnham; 4 September 1988 (age 38) Liverpool, England

Cycling career
- Sport: Cycling
- Disciplines: Track, Road
- Role: Stoker
Medal record
Women's para cycling
Representing Great Britain
Paralympic Games
| Gold medal – first place | 2016 Rio de Janeiro | Ind. pursuit B |
| Gold medal – first place | 2020 Tokyo | Ind. pursuit B |
| Silver medal – second place | 2020 Tokyo | Road time trial B |
| Bronze medal – third place | 2016 Rio de Janeiro | Road time trial B |
| Bronze medal – third place | 2024 Paris | Ind. pursuit B |
| Bronze medal – third place | 2024 Paris | Road time trial B |
| Bronze medal – third place | 2024 Paris | Road race B |
Track World Championships
| Gold medal – first place | 2018 Rio de Janeiro | Tandem B pursuit |
| Silver medal – second place | 2011 Montichiari | Tandem B pursuit |
| Silver medal – second place | 2017 Los Angeles | Tandem B pursuit |
| Silver medal – second place | 2023 Glasgow | Tandem B pursuit |
| Silver medal – second place | 2024 Rio de Janeiro | Tandem B team sprint |
| Bronze medal – third place | 2016 Montichiari | Tandem B pursuit |
| Bronze medal – third place | 2019 Apeldoorn | Tandem B pursuit |
Road World Championships
| Gold medal – first place | 2013 Baie-Comeau | Tandem B time trial |
| Gold medal – first place | 2014 Greenville | Tandem B road race |
| Gold medal – first place | 2021 Cascais | Tandem B time trial |
| Silver medal – second place | 2013 Baie-Comeau | Tandem B road race |
| Silver medal – second place | 2017 Pietermaritzburg | Tandem B time trial |
| Silver medal – second place | 2018 Maniago | Tandem B road race |
| Silver medal – second place | 2018 Maniago | Tandem B time trial |
| Bronze medal – third place | 2014 Greenville | Tandem B time trial |
| Bronze medal – third place | 2019 Emmen | Tandem B time trial |
| Bronze medal – third place | 2021 Cascais | Tandem B road race |
| Bronze medal – third place | 2024 Zurich | Tandem B time trial |

Lora Marie Fachie (née Turnham; born 4 September 1988) is a visually impaired English former racing cyclist who competed in para-cycling tandem road and track events. She is a double world champion, with pilot Corrine Hall, in the tandem road race and 1 km time trial events.

== Personal life ==
Fachie was born in Liverpool, England in 1988. Fachie has a hereditary sight loss condition which also affects her two brothers, Roy and Mark, and her mother. At the age of five she lost her sight, leaving her only with light perception. She now uses a guide dog.

Fachie attended Gateacre School in Liverpool as a child and matriculated to the University of Birmingham where she studied physiotherapy. She is married to fellow Paralympian Neil Fachie.

== Cycling career ==
Fachie comes from a sporting family, both her brothers have represented England in VI (visually impaired) cricket and Roy played 5-a-side football for Great Britain at the 2012 Summer Paralympics. Fachie first became involved in cycling in 2009 whilst at university. That year she was teamed up with sighted rider Rebecca Rimmington and Fachie attended her first UCI Para-Cycling World Cup event, in Italy, winning bronze in the Tandem B road race. The following year she took gold, again with Rimmington, in the road race at the Spanish World Cup.

=== 2012 Summer Paralympics ===
In 2011 Fachie switched pilot, now racing with Fiona Duncan. The two found success at their first major international event when they won the silver at the 2011 UCI Para-cycling Track World Championships in Montichiari in the Pursuit. Fachie also picked up two more World Cup medals that year, a silver and bronze, in Sydney. Fachie and Duncan spent another season together, taking gold in the time trial at the World Cup in Segovia, Spain. Fachie's results saw her selected for the 2012 Summer Paralympics in London, selected for both road and track events. On the road Fachie finished 7th in the time trial and 8th in the road race. The time trial was particularly disappointing for Fachie as she suffered a mechanical fault to her bike whilst holding a 14-second lead on the final lap. In the track she finished just outside the podium places in both her events, losing the bronze medal race against British teammate Aileen McGlynn in the individual pursuit and a fourth-place finish in the 1km time trial.

Following London Fachie was paired up with a new pilot, Corrine Hall, and quickly her fortunes improved. At the 2013 UCI Para-Cycling Road World Championships in Baie-Comeau, the pair took gold in the time trial and silver in the road race. More medals followed with a second world title at the 2014 Road World Championships, this time in the road race, with a further bronze in the time trial. 2014 also saw Turnham collect four more gold medals on the World Cup circuit, two each at Castiglione della Pescaia and Segovia. Although Fachie failed to win a medal in the 2015 World Championships, this time paired with Lauryn Therin, she was back to winning ways when reunited with Hall as they continued to win World Cup gold. A time trial title at Yverdon-les-Bains in Switzerland and both the time trial and road race gold at Pietermaritzburg in South Africa.

=== 2016 Summer Paralympics ===
In the buildup to the 2016 Summer Paralympics in Rio, Fachie and Hall took part in the 2016 Track World Championships, winning bronze in the Tandem individual pursuit. Fachie then travelled to Ostend in Belgium where she took two more silver World Cup medals. The pair were later named as part of the Great Britain team to compete at the Rio Paralympics, entering four events over both road and track disciplines.

=== 2020 Summer Paralympics ===
At the 2020 Tokyo Paralympics, Fachie won gold in the women's individual pursuit B alongside Hall.

Fachie was appointed Member of the Order of the British Empire (MBE) in the 2017 New Year Honours for services to cycling and Officer of the Order of the British Empire (OBE) in the 2022 Birthday Honours, also for services to cycling.

=== 2024 Summer Paralympics ===
Six months before the Paralympic Games, at the world championships Lora and her husband had their silver medals and other possessions stolen, when they were mugged in Rio.

Lora was selected to compete in her fourth Paralympic Games, winning three bronze medals, in the individual pursuit, road race and time trial.

=== Retirement ===
Fachie announced her retirement from professional cycling in June 2025.
