= Eve McCrystal =

Irish para-cyclist

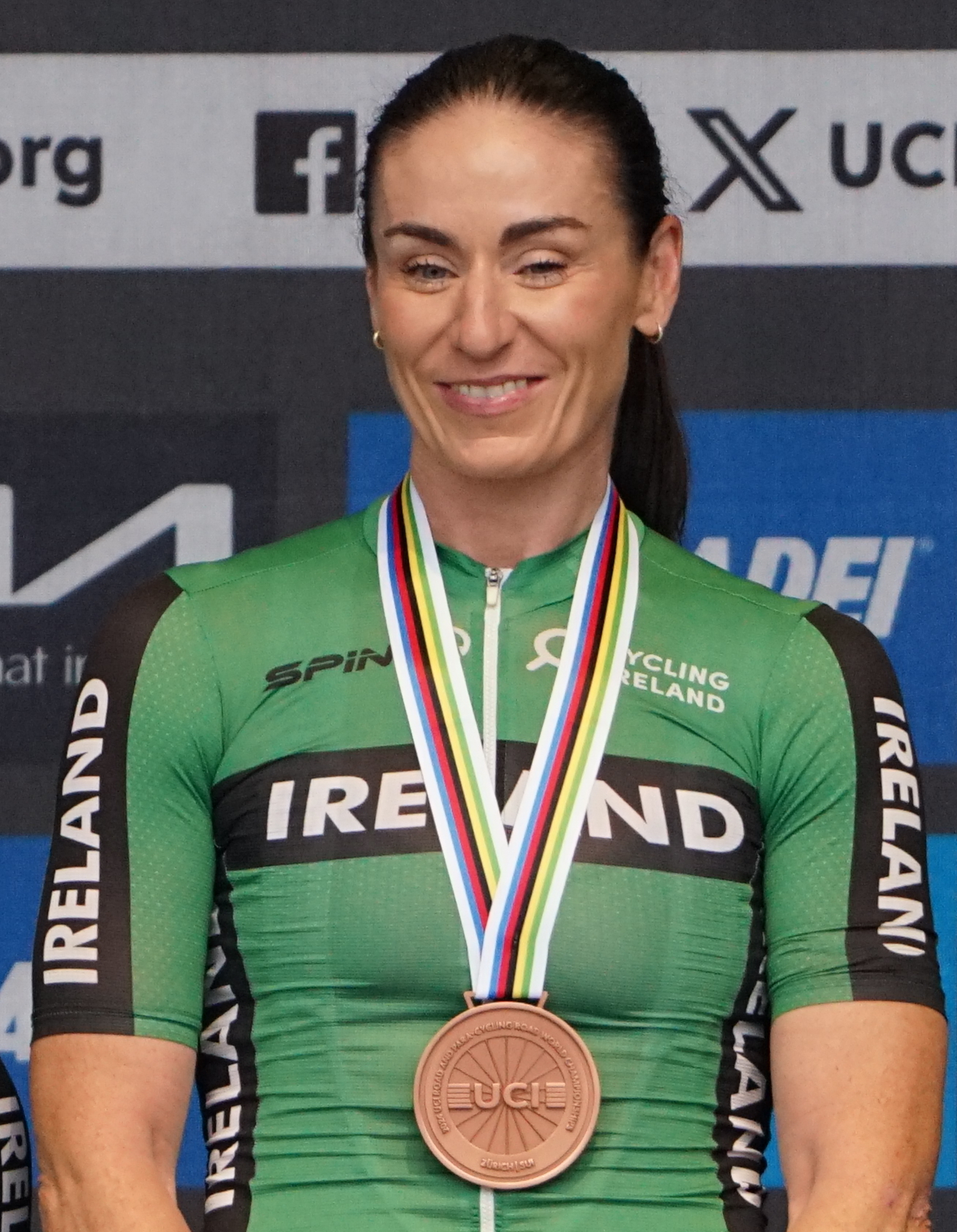

Personal information
- Born: 28 July 1978 (age 48)
- Home town: Dundalk, County Louth

Cycling career
- Sport: Cycling
- Disciplines: Road; Para-cycling
- Role: Rider
- Rider type: Tandem pilot

Amateur team
- Garda Cycling Club
Medal record
Representing Ireland
Summer Paralympics
Women's para-cycling
Gold medal – first place	2016 Rio de Janeiro	Time trial B
Gold medal – first place	2020 Tokyo	Time trial B
Silver medal – second place	2016 Rio de Janeiro	Road race B
Silver medal – second place	2020 Tokyo	Ind. pursuit B
Silver medal – second place	2024 Paris	Ind. pursuit B
UCI Para-cycling Road World Championships
Gold medal – first place	2017 Pietermaritzburg	Time trial (B)
Gold medal – first place	2017 Pietermaritzburg	Road race (B)
Gold medal – first place	2018 Maniago	Time trial (B)
Gold medal – first place	2018 Maniago	Road race (B)
Gold medal – first place	2019 Emmen	Time trial (B)
Silver medal – second place	2014 Greenville	Road race (B)
Silver medal – second place	2019 Emmen	Road race (B)
Bronze medal – third place	2024 Zurich	Road race (B)
UCI Para-cycling Track World Championships
Bronze medal – third place	2015 Apeldoorn	3km pursuit (B)
Bronze medal – third place	2018 Rio de Janeiro	3km pursuit (B)

Evelyn McCrystal (born 28 July 1978) is a former Irish para-cyclist who competed in tandem events for Ireland, as a sighted pilot she is a two time Paralympic champion with blind cyclist Katie-George Dunlevy.

== Career ==
McCrystal won a gold medal at the time trial B and a silver in the road race at the 2016 Summer Paralympics together with Katie-George Dunlevy. McCrystal, along with Dunlevy, won Gold in the 108-kilometre (67-mile) road race at the 2019 Yorkshire Para-Cyclist International event with a time of 02:36:57. In 2021 the pair won a silver medal at the delayed 2020 Summer Paralympics in the individual pursuit event.

McCrystal has also taken two titles at the Irish National Cycling Championships – the road race in 2018 and the time trial in 2020.

== Personal life ==
McCrystal is a member of the Garda Síochána – the national police force in the Republic of Ireland – based in Ballybay, County Monaghan. She also does Ironman Triathlons in her spare time. She has two daughters.
