= Corrine Hall =

English cyclist (born 1991)

Corrine Hall OBE
Personal information
- Nationality: British
- Born: Corrine Claire Hall; 20 February 1991 (age 35)

Sport
- Country: Great Britain
- Sport: Cycling
Medal record
Representing Great Britain
Women's Para-cycling
Paralympic Games
Gold medal – first place	2016 Rio de Janeiro	Ind. pursuit B
Bronze medal – third place	2016 Rio de Janeiro	Road time trial B
Bronze medal – third place	2024 Paris	Ind. pursuit B
Bronze medal – third place	2024 Paris	Road time trial B
Bronze medal – third place	2024 Paris	Road race B
Track World Championships
Gold medal – first place	2017 Los Angeles	Tandem B pursuit
Gold medal – first place	2017 Los Angeles	Tandem B kilo
Gold medal – first place	2017 Los Angeles	Tandem B match sprint
Silver medal – second place	2024 Rio de Janeiro	Tandem B team sprint
Bronze medal – third place	2016 Montichiari	Tandem B pursuit
Road World Championships
Gold medal – first place	2013 Baie-Comeau	Tandem B time trial
Gold medal – first place	2014 Greenville	Tandem B road race
Silver medal – second place	2013 Baie-Comeau	Tandem B road race
Bronze medal – third place	2014 Greenville	Tandem B time trial
Bronze medal – third place	2024 Zurich	Tandem B time trial
- Updated on 31 December 2016

Corrine Claire Hall (born 20 February 1991) is an English cyclist. She represented Great Britain in the 2016 Rio Paralympics as a sighted pilot for British cycling Paralympian, Lora Fachie with whom she was paired in 2013.

== Early life and education ==
Hall is from Mitcham, South London. She attended Esher College. She went on to study Sports Science at St Mary's University, Twickenham.

== 2016 Summer Paralympics ==
On 11 September 2016, Hall and Fachie won a gold medal in Rio de Janeiro at the 2016 Summer Paralympics, in the Women's individual pursuit B.

Hall was appointed Member of the Order of the British Empire (MBE) in the 2017 New Year Honours and Officer of the Order of the British Empire (OBE) in the 2022 Birthday Honours for services to cycling.
