= United States at the 2024 Summer Paralympics =

- Flag of the United States
- IPC code: USA
- NPC: United States Paralympic Committee

in Paris, France August 28, 2024 – September 8, 2024
- Competitors: 220 in 20 sports
- Flag bearers: Nicky Nieves; Steve Serio
- Medals Ranked 3rd: Gold 36 Silver 42 Bronze 27 Total 105

Summer Paralympics appearances (overview)
- 1960; 1964; 1968; 1972; 1976; 1980; 1984; 1988; 1992; 1996; 2000; 2004; 2008; 2012; 2016; 2020; 2024

The United States competed at the 2024 Summer Paralympics in Paris, France, from August 28 to September 8, 2024.

== Medalists ==
The following U.S. competitors won medals at the games. In the discipline sections below, the medalists' names are bolded.

Medal	Name	Sport	Event	Date
Gold	Gia Pergolini	Swimming	Women's 100 m backstroke S13	August 30
Gold	Noah Malone	Athletics	Men's 100 m T12	August 31
Gold	Jaydin Blackwell	Athletics	Men's 100 m T38	August 31
Gold	Daniel Romanchuk	Athletics	Men's 5000 m T54	August 31
Gold	Olivia Chambers	Swimming	Women's 400 m freestyle S13	August 31
Gold	Mallory Weggemann	Swimming	Women's 200 m individual medley SM7	August 31
Gold	Matt Stutzman	Archery	Men's individual compound	September 1
Gold	Jason Tabansky	Archery	Men's individual W1	September 1
Gold	Roderick Townsend-Roberts	Athletics	Men's high jump T47	September 1
Gold	Ezra Frech	Athletics	Men's 100 m T63	September 2
Gold	Chris Hammer	Paratriathlon	Men's PTS5	September 2
Gold	Hailey Danz	Paratriathlon	Women's PTS2	September 2
Gold	Grace Norman	Paratriathlon	Women's PTS5	September 2
Gold	Morgan Stickney	Swimming	Women's 400 m freestyle S7	September 2
Gold	Jaydin Blackwell	Athletics	Men's 400 m T38	September 3
Gold	Ezra Frech	Athletics	Men's high jump T63	September 3
Gold	Fiona Howard	Equestrian	Individual grade II	September 3
Gold	Rebecca Hart	Equestrian	Individual grade III	September 3
Gold	Leanne Smith	Swimming	Women's 100 m freestyle S3	September 3
Gold	Christie Raleigh Crossley	Swimming	Women's 100 m backstroke S9	September 3
Gold	Noelle Malkamaki	Athletics	Women's shot put F46	September 4
Gold	Katerina Brim	Cycling	Women's road time trial H1–3	September 4
Gold	Oksana Masters	Cycling	Women's road time trial H4–5	September 4
Gold	Samantha Bosco	Cycling	Women's road time trial C4	September 4
Gold	Jessica Long	Swimming	Women's 400 m freestyle S8	September 4
Gold	Jeremy Campbell	Athletics	Men's discus throw F64	September 5
Gold	Oksana Masters	Cycling	Women's road race H5	September 5
Gold	Hunter Woodhall	Athletics	Men's 400 m T62	September 6
Gold	Rebecca Hart; Fiona Howard; Roxanne Trunnell	Equestrian	Team	September 6
Gold	Leanne Smith	Swimming	Women's 50 m freestyle S4	September 6
Gold	Christie Raleigh Crossley	Swimming	Women's 100 m butterfly S9	September 6
Gold	Fiona Howard	Equestrian	Individual freestyle grade II	September 7
Gold	Rebecca Hart	Equestrian	Individual freestyle grade III	September 7
Gold	United States women's national sitting volleyball team: Katie Holloway Bridge; Whitney Dosty; Tia Edwards; Heather Erickson; Kaleo Kanahele Maclay; Monique Matthews; Nicky Nieves; Sydney Satchell; Emma Schieck; Alexis Shifflett-Patterson; Lora Webster; Bethany Zummo	Sitting volleyball	Women's tournament	September 7
Gold	Jessica Long	Swimming	Women's 100 m butterfly S8	September 7
Gold	United States men's national wheelchair basketball team: Brian Bell; John Boie; AJ Fitzpatrick; Nate Hinze; Trevon Jenifer; Talen Jourdan; Jeromie Meyer; Fabian Romo; Jorge Salazar; Paul Schulte; Steve Serio; Jacob Williams	Wheelchair basketball	Men's tournament	September 7
Silver	Elizabeth Marks	Swimming	Women's 50 m freestyle S6	August 29
Silver	Christie Raleigh Crossley	Swimming	Women's 50 m freestyle S10	August 29
Silver	Grace Nuhfer	Swimming	Women's 100 m butterfly S13	August 29
Silver	Korban Best	Athletics	Men's 100 m T47	August 30
Silver	Elizabeth Marks	Swimming	Women's 200 m individual medley SM6	August 30
Silver	Abbas Karimi; Elizabeth Marks; Zachary Shattuck; Leanne Smith	Swimming	Mixed 4 × 50 m freestyle relay 20 pts	August 30
Silver	Ryan Medrano	Athletics	Men's 100 m T38	August 31
Silver	Susannah Scaroni	Athletics	Women's 5000 m T54	August 31
Silver	Jaleen Roberts	Athletics	Women's long jump T37	September 1
Silver	Skylar Dahl; Emelie Eldracher; Alex Flynn; Ben Washburne; Gemma Wollenschlaeger	Rowing	PR3 Mixed coxed four	September 1
Silver	Miles Krajewski; Jayci Simon	Badminton	Mixed doubles SH6	September 2
Silver	Mohamed Lahna	Paratriathlon	Men's PTS2	September 2
Silver	Carson Clough	Paratriathlon	Men's PTS4	September 2
Silver	Kendall Gretsch	Paratriathlon	Women's PTWC	September 2
Silver	Yan Xiao Gong	Shooting	Mixed 25 m pistol SH1	September 2
Silver	Gia Pergolini	Swimming	Women's 50 m freestyle S13	September 2
Silver	McKenzie Coan	Swimming	Women's 400 m freestyle S7	September 2
Silver	United States national wheelchair rugby team: Sarah Adam; Chuck Aoki; Clayton Brackett; Jeff Butler; Lee Fredette; Brad Hudspeth; Chuck Melton; Eric Newby; Josh O'Neill; Zion Redington; Mason Symons; Josh Wheeler	Wheelchair rugby	Mixed tournament	September 2
Silver	Ryan Medrano	Athletics	Men's 400 m T38	September 3
Silver	Brittni Mason	Athletics	Women's 100 m T47	September 3
Silver	Roxanne Trunnell	Equestrian	Individual grade I	September 3
Silver	Olivia Chambers	Swimming	Women's 200 m individual medley SM13	September 3
Silver	Tatyana McFadden	Athletics	Women's 100 metres T54	September 4
Silver	Derek Loccident	Athletics	Men's long jump T64	September 4
Silver	Morgan Stickney	Swimming	Women's 100 m freestyle S7	September 4
Silver	Christie Raleigh Crossley	Swimming	Women's 100 m freestyle S9	September 4
Silver	Noah Malone	Athletics	Men's 400 m T12	September 5
Silver	Taylor Swanson	Athletics	Women's 100 m T37	September 5
Silver	Arelle Middleton	Athletics	Women's shot put F64	September 5
Silver	Maria Liana Mutia	Judo	Women's 57 kg J1	September 5
Silver	Alexandra Truwit	Swimming	Women's 400 m freestyle S10	September 5
Silver	Olivia Chambers	Swimming	Women's 100 m breaststroke SB13	September 5
Silver	Abbas Karimi; Elizabeth Marks; Morgan Ray; Leanne Smith	Swimming	Mixed 4 × 50 m medley relay 20 pts	September 5
Silver	Derek Loccident	Athletics	Men's high jump T64	September 6
Silver	Noah Jaffe	Swimming	Men's 100 m freestyle S8	September 6
Silver	Alexandra Truwit	Swimming	Women's 100 m backstroke S10	September 6
Silver	Brittni Mason	Athletics	Women's 200 m T47	September 7
Silver	Isaac Jean-Paul	Athletics	Men's long jump T13	September 7
Silver	Dennis Connors	Cycling	Men's road race T1–2\	September 7
Silver	Elizabeth Marks	Swimming	Women's 100 m backstroke S6	September 7
Silver	Mallory Weggemann	Swimming	Women's 50 m butterfly S7	September 7
Silver	United States women's national wheelchair basketball team: Josie Aslakson; Abigail Bauleke; Kaitlyn Eaton; Ixhelt González; Rose Hollermann; Alejandra Ibáñez; Bailey Moody; Rebecca Murray; Emily Oberst; Courtney Ryan; Natalie Schneider; Lindsey Zurbrugg	Wheelchair basketball	Women's tournament	September 8
Bronze	Liza Corso	Athletics	Women's 1500 m T13	August 31
Bronze	Beatriz Hatz	Athletics	Women's long jump T64	August 31
Bronze	Elouan Gardon	Cycling	Men's pursuit C5	August 31
Bronze	Julia Gaffney	Swimming	Women's 200 m individual medley SM7	August 31
Bronze	Evan Medell	Taekwondo	Men's +80 kg	August 31
Bronze	Brian Siemann	Athletics	Men's 400 m T53	September 1
Bronze	Daniel Romanchuk	Athletics	Men's 400 m T54	September 1
Bronze	Susannah Scaroni	Athletics	Women's 800 m T54	September 1
Bronze	Mark Barr	Paratriathlon	Men's PTS2	September 2
Bronze	Allysa Seely	Paratriathlon	Women's PTS2	September 2
Bronze	Susannah Scaroni	Athletics	Women's 1500 m T54	September 3
Bronze	Jarryd Wallace	Athletics	Men's long jump T64	September 4
Bronze	Brian Siemann	Athletics	Men's 800 m T54	September 5
Bronze	Jaleen Roberts	Athletics	Women's 100 m T37	September 5
Bronze	David Blair	Athletics	Men's discus throw F64	September 5
Bronze	Colleen Young	Swimming	Women's 100 m breaststroke SB13	September 5
Bronze	Ian Seidenfeld	Table tennis	Men's individual C6	September 5
Bronze	Michael Brannigan	Athletics	Men's 1500 m T20	September 6
Bronze	Korban Best^{[a]} Noah Malone; Tatyana McFadden; Taylor Swanson; Hunter Woodhall	Athletics	Mixed 4 × 100 m relay universal	September 6
Bronze	Eva Houston	Athletics	Women's 800 m T34	September 7
Bronze	Clara Brown	Cycling	Women's road race C1–3	September 7
Bronze	Katerina Brim; Travis Gaertner; Matt Tingley	Cycling	Mixed team relay H1–5	September 7
Bronze	Kate Shoemaker	Equestrian	Individual freestyle grade IV	September 7
Bronze	Christella Garcia	Judo	Women's +70 kg J1	September 7
Bronze	Noah Jaffe; Christie Raleigh Crossley; Natalie Sims; Matthew Torres	Swimming	Mixed 4 × 100 m freestyle relay 34 pts	September 7
Bronze	Susannah Scaroni	Athletics	Women's marathon T54	September 8
Bronze	Blake Haxton	Paracanoeing	Men's VL2	September 8

**^{a}** - Indicates athlete that competed in heats but not the final.

Medals by sport
Sport	1st place, gold medalist(s)	2nd place, silver medalist(s)	3rd place, bronze medalist(s)	Total
Swimming	10	17	3	**30**
Athletics	10	14	14	**38**
Equestrian	5	1	1	**7**
Cycling	4	1	3	**8**
Paratriathlon	3	3	2	**8**
Archery	2	0	0	**2**
Wheelchair basketball	1	1	0	**2**
Sitting volleyball	1	0	0	**1**
Judo	0	1	1	**2**
Badminton	0	1	0	**1**
Rowing	0	1	0	**1**
Shooting	0	1	0	**1**
Wheelchair rugby	0	1	0	**1**
Paracanoeing	0	0	1	**1**
Table tennis	0	0	1	**1**
Taekwondo	0	0	1	**1**
Total	36	42	27	105

Medals by day
Day	Date	1st place, gold medalist(s)	2nd place, silver medalist(s)	3rd place, bronze medalist(s)	Total
1	August 29	0	3	0	**3**
2	August 30	1	3	0	**4**
3	August 31	5	2	5	**12**
4	September 1	3	2	3	**8**
5	September 2	5	8	2	**15**
6	September 3	6	4	1	**11**
7	September 4	5	4	1	**10**
8	September 5	2	7	5	**14**
9	September 6	4	3	2	**9**
10	September 7	5	5	6	**16**
11	September 8	0	1	2	**3**
Total		36	42	27	105

Medals by gender
Gender	1st place, gold medalist(s)	2nd place, silver medalist(s)	3rd place, bronze medalist(s)	Total
Female	22	25	13	**60**
Male	13	12	11	**36**
Mixed	1	5	3	**9**
Total	36	42	27	105

Multiple medalists
Name	Sport	1st place, gold medalist(s)	2nd place, silver medalist(s)	3rd place, bronze medalist(s)	Total
Christie Raleigh Crossley	Swimming	2	2	1	**5**
Elizabeth Marks	Swimming	0	5	0	**5**
Leanne Smith	Swimming	2	2	0	**4**
Susannah Scaroni	Athletics	0	1	3	**4**
Rebecca Hart	Equestrian	3	0	0	**3**
Fiona Howard	Equestrian	3	0	0	**3**
Olivia Chambers	Swimming	1	2	0	**3**
Noah Malone	Athletics	1	1	1	**3**
Jaydin Blackwell	Athletics	2	0	0	**2**
Ezra Frech	Athletics	2	0	0	**2**
Jessica Long	Swimming	2	0	0	**2**
Oksana Masters	Cycling	2	0	0	**2**
Gia Pergolini	Swimming	1	1	0	**2**
Morgan Stickney	Swimming	1	1	0	**2**
Roxanne Trunnell	Equestrian	1	1	0	**2**
Mallory Weggemann	Swimming	1	1	0	**2**
Daniel Romanchuk	Athletics	1	0	1	**2**
Hunter Woodhall	Athletics	1	0	1	**2**
Abbas Karimi	Swimming	0	2	0	**2**
Derek Loccident	Athletics	0	2	0	**2**
Ryan Medrano	Athletics	0	2	0	**2**
Alexandra Truwit	Swimming	0	2	0	**2**
Korban Best	Athletics	0	1	1	**2**
Noah Jaffe	Swimming	0	1	1	**2**
Tatyana McFadden	Athletics	0	1	1	**2**
Jaleen Roberts	Athletics	0	1	1	**2**
Taylor Swanson	Athletics	0	1	1	**2**
Brian Siemann	Athletics	0	0	2	**2**

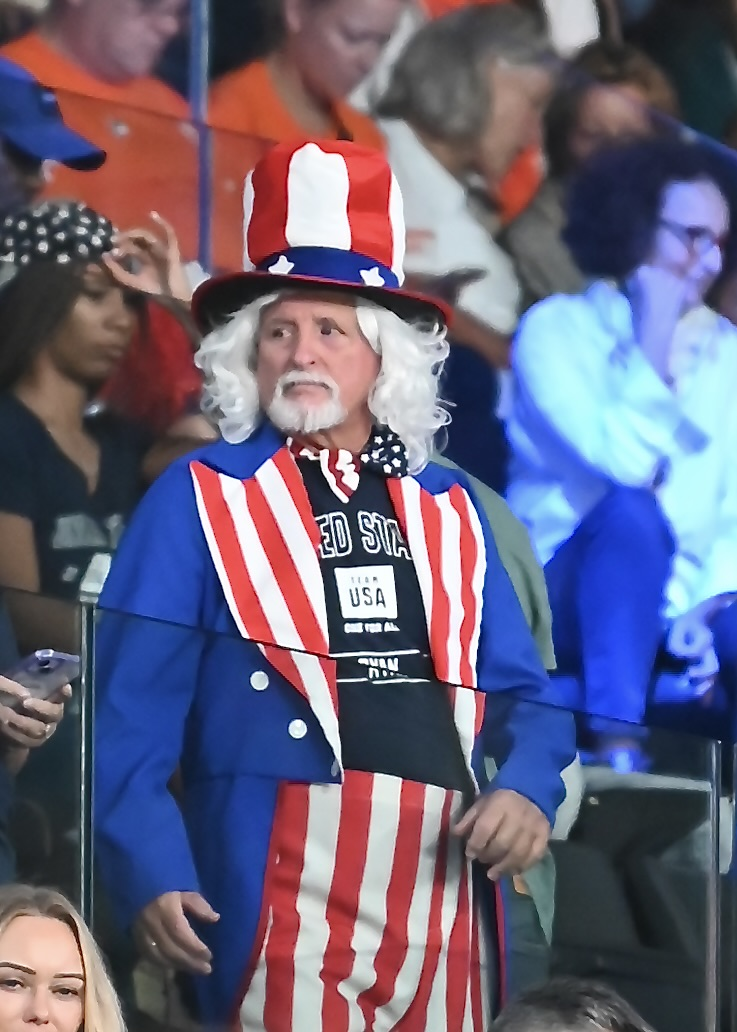
The father of wheelchair basketball player Courtney Ryan

== Competitors ==
The following is the list of number of competitors in the Games, including game-eligible alternates in team sports.

Sport	Men	Women	Total
Archery	5	1	6
Athletics	30	25	55
Badminton	1	1	2
Cycling	9	6	15
Equestrian	0	4	4
Goalball	6	0	6
Judo	0	2	2
Paracanoeing	1	1	2
Paratriathlon	8	9	17
Powerlifting	1	1	2
Rowing	3	3	6
Shooting	4	2	6
Sitting volleyball	0	12	12
Swimming	11	22	33
Table tennis	3	0	3
Taekwondo	1	1	2
Wheelchair basketball	12	12	24
Wheelchair fencing	3	3	6
Wheelchair rugby	11	1	12
Wheelchair tennis	3	2	5
Total	112	108	220

== Archery ==
United States entered three para-archers in compound and recurve event by virtue of their result at the 2023 World Para Archery Championships in Plzeň, Czech Republic.

Athlete	Event	Ranking Round		Round of 32	Round of 16	Quarterfinals	Semifinals	Final / BM	
Athlete	Event	Score	Seed	Opposition Score	Opposition Score	Opposition Score	Opposition Score	Opposition Score	Rank
Kevin Polish	Men's individual compound	695	7	Gale (ESP); W 142–140	Milne (AUS); W 144–142	He (CHN); L 146–147	Did not advance		5
Matt Stutzman	Men's individual compound	686	19	Sardina (MEX); W 142–136	Forsberg (FIN); W 141–141 (4X–3X)	MacQueen (GBR); W 143–142	He (CHN); W 148–148 (10–9)	Ai (CHN); W 149–147	1st place, gold medalist(s)
Eric Bennett	Men's individual recurve	602	21	Selvathamby (MAS); L 2–6	Did not advance				=17
Jordan White	Men's individual recurve	580	27	Ciszek (POL); L 2–6	Did not advance				=17
Jason Tabansky	Men's individual W1	654	6	—N/a	Franco (BRA); W 137–122	Drahonínský (CZE); W 139–131	Tonon (ITA); W 136–115	Han (CHN); W 134–131	1st place, gold medalist(s)
Tracy Otto	Women's individual W1	547	10	—N/a	Liu (CHN); W 118–113	Chen (CHN); L 107–124	Did not advance		8
Jason Tabansky; Tracy Otto	Mixed team W1	1201	6	—N/a		Italy (ITA); L 126–139	Did not advance		6

== Athletics ==
U.S. track and field athletes achieved quota places for the following events based on their results at the 2023 World Championships, 2024 World Championships, or through high performance allocation, as long as they meet the minimum entry standard (MES).

Key
- Note–Ranks given for track events are within the athlete's heat only
- Q = Qualified for the next round
- q = Qualified for the next round as a fastest loser
- WR = World Record
- PR = Paralympic Record
- AR = Americas Record
- NR = National Record
- N/A = Round not applicable for the event
- Bye = Athlete not required to compete in round

Track & road events
Men

Athlete	Event	Heat		Final	
Athlete	Event	Time	Rank	Time	Rank
Noah Malone	100 m T12	10.75	1 Q	10.71	1st place, gold medalist(s)
Isaac Jean-Paul	100 m T13	10.97 (.967)	4 q	10.93 (.929)	5
Jaydin Blackwell	100 m T38	—N/a		10.64	1st place, gold medalist(s)
Nick Mayhugh	100 m T38	—N/a		11.37	7
Ryan Medrano	100 m T38	—N/a		10.97	2nd place, silver medalist(s)
Korban Best	100 m T47	10.78	1 Q	10.75	2nd place, silver medalist(s)
Rayven Sample	100 m T47	11.56	8	Did not advance	
Brian Siemann	100 m T53	15.35	3 Q	15.27	4
Ezra Frech	100 m T63	12.14	3 Q	12.06	1st place, gold medalist(s)
Desmond Jackson	100 m T63	12.41	4 q	12.49	7
Jonathan Gore	100 m T64	11.34	6	Did not advance	
Derek Loccident	100 m T64	11.29	6	Did not advance	
Hunter Woodhall	100 m T64	11.02	3 Q	10.96	6
Jonathan Gore	200 m T64	23.89	5	Did not advance	
Noah Malone	400 m T12	48.65	1 Q	49.35	2nd place, silver medalist(s)
Jaydin Blackwell	400 m T38	—N/a		48.49 PR	1st place, gold medalist(s)
Ryan Medrano	400 m T38	—N/a		49.47	2nd place, silver medalist(s)
Rayven Sample	400 m T47	50.33	6	Did not advance	
Brian Siemann	400 m T53	49.16	2 Q	47.84	3rd place, bronze medalist(s)
Daniel Romanchuk	400 m T54	45.18 AM	1 Q	45.11 AM	3rd place, bronze medalist(s)
Blake Leeper	400 m T62	—N/a		47.32	4
Hunter Woodhall	400 m T62	—N/a		46.36	1st place, gold medalist(s)
Brian Siemann	800 m T53	—N/a		1:38.44	3rd place, bronze medalist(s)
Daniel Romanchuk	800 m T54	1:31.78	2 Q	1:31.24	5
Joel Gomez	1500 m T13	—N/a		3:48.42 AM	7
Michael Brannigan	1500 m T20	—N/a		3:49.91	3rd place, bronze medalist(s)
Leo Merle	1500 m T38	—N/a		4:16.43	6
Aaron Pike	1500 m T54	2:58.86	7	Did not advance	
Daniel Romanchuk	1500 m T54	3:05.10	1 Q	2:54.31	9
Aaron Pike	5000 m T54	11:18.76	6	Did not advance	
Daniel Romanchuk	5000 m T54	11:18.41	3 Q	10:55.28	1st place, gold medalist(s)
Brian Siemann	5000 m T54	11:18.96	5 Q	12:47.92	9
Aaron Pike	Marathon T54	—N/a		1:36:23	7
Daniel Romanchuk	Marathon T54	—N/a		1:32:23	4
Brian Siemann	Marathon T54	—N/a		1:51:56	11

Women

Athlete	Event	Heat		Final	
Athlete	Event	Time	Rank	Time	Rank
Kym Crosby	100 m T13	12.41	3 Q	12.40	4
Erin Kerkhoff	100 m T13	12.70	4 q	12.75	7
Lauren Fields	100 m T34	20.77	5	Did not advance	
Eva Houston	100 m T34	19.09	3 Q	18.65	4
Jaleen Roberts	100 m T37	13.34	2 Q	13.29	3rd place, bronze medalist(s)
Taylor Swanson	100 m T37	13.16	1 Q	13.19	2nd place, silver medalist(s)
Catarina Guimarães	100 m T38	13.54	7	Did not advance	
Brittni Mason	100 m T47	12.18	2 Q	12.10	2nd place, silver medalist(s)
Chelsea Stein	100 m T53	—N/a		18.30	7
Hannah Dederick	100 m T54	16.64	3 Q	16.50	6
Tatyana McFadden	100 m T54	15.55 PR	1 Q	15.67	2nd place, silver medalist(s)
Noelle Lambert	100 m T63	15.38	4 q	15.39	7
Lindi Marcusen	100 m T63	15.09	4 q	15.11	6
Femita Ayanbeku	100 m T64	12.98	2 Q	13.15	6
Annie Carey	100 m T64	13.39	5	Did not advance	
Beatriz Hatz	100 m T64	13.28	4	Did not advance	
Jaleen Roberts	200 m T37	—N/a		27.99	4
Taylor Swanson	200 m T37	—N/a		44.85	9
Brittni Mason	200 m T47	25.61	1 Q	25.18	2nd place, silver medalist(s)
Annie Carey	200 m T64	27.87 AM	3 Q	27.62 AM	6
Beatriz Hatz	200 m T64	27.86	4 q	27.45	5
Kym Crosby	400 m T13	59.04	4	Did not advance	
Erin Kerkhoff	400 m T13	57.42	2 Q	57.19	5
Breanna Clark	400 m T20	56.32	2 Q	56.43	4
Catarina Guimarães	400 m T38	1:09.63	6	Did not advance	
Chelsea Stein	400 m T53	—N/a		1:06.47	8
Hannah Dederick	400 m T54	54.62	2 Q	54.68	4
Tatyana McFadden	400 m T54	54.01	3 Q	DSQ	
Lauren Fields	800 m T34	—N/a		2:33.51	8
Eva Houston	800 m T34	—N/a		2:05.94	3rd place, bronze medalist(s)
Chelsea Stein	800 m T53	—N/a		2:11.91	7
Hannah Dederick	800 m T54	1:46.30	4 q	1:48.20	7
Tatyana McFadden	800 m T54	1:47.22	1 Q	1:43.58	4
Susannah Scaroni	800 m T54	1:47.37	2 Q	1:43.42	3rd place, bronze medalist(s)
Liza Corso	1500 m T13	—N/a		4:23.45	3rd place, bronze medalist(s)
Kaitlin Bounds	1500 m T20	—N/a		4:40.30	6
Jenna Fesemyer	1500 m T54	3:38.10	7	Did not advance	
Susannah Scaroni	1500 m T54	3:19.84 PR	1 Q	3:16.68	3rd place, bronze medalist(s)
Jenna Fesemyer	5000 m T54	13:33.73	5 Q	12:19.68	9
Susannah Scaroni	5000 m T54	11:38.34	1 Q	10:45.18	2nd place, silver medalist(s)
Jenna Fesemyer	Marathon T54	—N/a		2:05:42	13
Tatyana McFadden	Marathon T54	—N/a		1:53:52	7
Susannah Scaroni	Marathon T54	—N/a		1:46:29	3rd place, bronze medalist(s)

Mixed

Athlete	Event	Heat		Final	
Athlete	Event	Time	Rank	Time	Rank
Korban Best^{[b]} Noah Malone; Tatyana McFadden; Taylor Swanson; Hunter Woodhall	4 × 100 m relay universal	46.39	1 q	47.32	3rd place, bronze medalist(s)

^{b} Athletes who participated in the heats only.

Field events
Men

Athlete	Event	Result	Rank
Isaac Jean-Paul	Long jump T13	7.20	2nd place, silver medalist(s)
Nick Mayhugh	Long jump T38	6.32	5
Ryan Medrano	Long jump T38	6.23	6
Roderick Townsend-Roberts	Long jump T47	6.89	4
Ezra Frech	Long jump T63	6.58	5
Derek Loccident	Long jump T64	7.79	2nd place, silver medalist(s)
Jarryd Wallace	Long jump T64	7.49	3rd place, bronze medalist(s)
Trenten Merrill	Long jump T64	6.41	9
Roderick Townsend-Roberts	High jump T47	2.12	1st place, gold medalist(s)
Ezra Frech	High jump T63	1.94 PR	1st place, gold medalist(s)
Sam Grewe	High jump T63	1.72	8
Derek Loccident	High jump T64	2.06 PR	2nd place, silver medalist(s)
Josh Cinnamo	Shot put F46	15.66	4
David Blair	Discus throw F64	57.76	3rd place, bronze medalist(s)
Jeremy Campbell	Discus throw F64	61.14	1st place, gold medalist(s)
Justin Phongsavanh	Javelin throw F54	29.31	4
Derek Loccident	Javelin throw F64	47.58	10

Women

Athlete	Event	Result	Rank
Jaleen Roberts	Long jump T37	4.77	2nd place, silver medalist(s)
Catarina Guimarães	Long jump T38	4.35	8
Taleah Williams	Long jump T47	5.33	6
Noelle Lambert	Long jump T63	4.66	4
Lindi Marcusen	Long jump T63	4.37	8
Annie Carey	Long jump T64	4.96	6
Beatriz Hatz	Long jump T64	5.38	3rd place, bronze medalist(s)
Noelle Malkamaki	Shot put F46	14.06 WR	1st place, gold medalist(s)
Samantha Heyison	Shot put F64	10.23	9
Arelle Middleton	Shot put F64	13.19	2nd place, silver medalist(s)
Cassie Mitchell	Discus throw F53	13.99	4
Jessica Heims	Discus throw F64	34.68	6
Samantha Heyison	Discus throw F64	38.78	5
Arelle Middleton	Discus throw F64	30.38	10

== Badminton ==
United States has qualified two para badminton players for the following events, through the release of BWF para-badminton Race to Paris Paralympic Ranking.

Athlete	Event	Group stage				Quarterfinal	Semifinal	Final / BM	
Athlete	Event	Opposition Score	Opposition Score	Opposition Score	Rank	Opposition Score	Opposition Score	Opposition Score	Rank
Miles Krajewski	Men's singles SH6	Meechai (THA); L (13–21, 20–22)	Nagar (IND); W (21–16, 21–18)	—N/a	2 Q	Tavares (BRA); L (12–21, 21–10, 21–23)	Did not advance		=5
Jayci Simon	Women's singles SH6	Sivan (IND); L (7–21, 8–21)	Lin (CHN); L (9–21, 12–21)	Cai (TPE); W (21–9, 21–8)	3	Did not advance			=7
Miles Krajewski; Jayci Simon	Mixed doubles SH6	Sivan / Solaimalai (IND); W (23–21, 21–11)	Meechai / Saeyang (THA); L (12–21, 17–21)	—N/a	2 Q	—N/a	Sivan / Solaimalai (IND); W (17–21, 21–14, 21–13)	Li / Lin (CHN); L (14–21, 12–21)	2nd place, silver medalist(s)

== Cycling ==
United States entered two para-cyclists (one in each gender) after finished the top eligible nation's at the 2022 UCI Nation's ranking allocation ranking.

=== Road ===
Men

Athlete	Event	Time	Rank
Cody Wills	Road race H1–2	1:50:59	5
Brandon Lyons	Road race H3	1:44:22	7
Travis Gaertner	Road race H4	1:35:30	4
Matt Tingley	Road race H4	DNF	
Elouan Gardon	Road race C4–5	2:25:58	7
Dennis Connors	Road race T1–2	1:17:09	2nd place, silver medalist(s)
Cody Wills	Time trial H2	30:01.21	6
Brandon Lyons	Time trial H3	49:34.02	10
Travis Gaertner	Time trial H4	43:27.26	5
Matt Tingley	Time trial H4	47:14.20	9
Elouan Gardon	Time trial C5	37:43.86	7
Dennis Connors	Time trial T1–2	24:37.11	5

Women

Athlete	Event	Time	Rank
Katerina Brim	Road race H1–4	DNS	
Oksana Masters	Road race H5	1:52:14	1st place, gold medalist(s)
Clara Brown	Road race C1–3	1:38.:48	3rd place, bronze medalist(s)
Jamie Whitmore	Road race C1–3	1:39:10	5
Samantha Bosco	Road race C4–5	1:57:03	4
Shawn Morelli	Road race C4–5	2:09:20	14
Katerina Brim	Time trial H1–3	24:14.59	1st place, gold medalist(s)
Oksana Masters	Time trial H4–5	23:45.20	1st place, gold medalist(s)
Clara Brown	Time trial C1–3	22:58.00	8
Jamie Whitmore	Time trial C1–3	23:57.57	11
Samantha Bosco	Time trial C4	21:39.24	1st place, gold medalist(s)
Shawn Morelli	Time trial C4	22:53.35	6

Mixed

Athlete	Event	Round 1	Round 2	Round 3	Total	
Athlete	Event	Time	Time	Time	Time	Rank
Katerina Brim; Travis Gaertner; Matt Tingley	Team relay H1–5	8:27	8:39	8:44	25:50	3rd place, bronze medalist(s)

=== Track ===
Pursuit

Athlete	Event	Qualifying		Final / BM	
Athlete	Event	Time	Rank	Opposition Result	Rank
Bryan Larsen	Men's C4	4:30.690	6	Did not advance	
Elouan Gardon	Men's C5	4:18.817	3 B	Bronze medal final Lässer (AUT); W 4:18.880–4:25.009	3rd place, bronze medalist(s)
Branden Walton; Pilot:Spencer Seggebruch	Men's B	4:10.290	6	Did not advance	
Samantha Bosco	Women's C4	3:46.413	4 B	Bronze medal final Shaw (CAN); L 3:48.589–3:46.942	4
Shawn Morelli	Women's C4	3:54.843	7	Did not advance	
Hannah Chadwick; Pilot:Skyler Espinoza	Women's B	3:40.259	6	Did not advance	

Qualifying legend: G - Qualify for gold medal final; B - Qualify for bronze medal final

Time trial

Athlete	Event	Qualifying			Final		
Athlete	Event	Time	FT	Rank	Time	FT	Rank
Elouan Gardon	Men's C4–5	1:08.006	1:08.006	15	Did not advance		
Bryan Larsen	Men's C4–5	1:08.158	1:07.245	14	Did not advance		
Branden Walton; Pilot:Spencer Seggebruch	Men's B	56.180	—N/a	8	Did not advance		
Samantha Bosco	Women's C4–5	40.588	40.048	12	Did not advance		
Shawn Morelli	Women's C4–5	42.618	42.051	13	Did not advance		
Hannah Chadwick; Pilot:Skyler Espinoza	Women's B	1:09.581	—N/a	6 Q	1:10.187	—N/a	6

== Equestrian ==
United States entered a full squad of four para-equestrians in the Paralympic equestrian competition by finishing the top seven nation's at the 2022 FEI World Championships in Herning, Denmark.

Athlete	Horse	Event	Score	Rank
Roxanne Trunnell	Fan Tastico H	Individual championship test grade I	78.000 Q	2nd place, silver medalist(s)
Roxanne Trunnell	Fan Tastico H	Individual freestyle test grade I	77.307	5
Fiona Howard	Diamond Dunes	Individual championship test grade II	76.931 Q	1st place, gold medalist(s)
Fiona Howard	Diamond Dunes	Individual freestyle test grade II	81.994	1st place, gold medalist(s)
Rebecca Hart	Floratina	Individual championship test grade III	77.900 Q	1st place, gold medalist(s)
Rebecca Hart	Floratina	Individual freestyle test grade III	85.534	1st place, gold medalist(s)
Kate Shoemaker	Vianne	Individual championship test grade IV	72.222 Q	5
Kate Shoemaker	Vianne	Individual freestyle test grade IV	80.170	3rd place, bronze medalist(s)
Rebecca Hart	See above	Team	78.567	—N/a
Fiona Howard	See above	Team	80.000	—N/a
Roxanne Trunnell	See above	Team	77.000	—N/a
Total	See above	Team	235.567	1st place, gold medalist(s)

== Goalball ==
Summary

Team	Event	Group Stage				Quarterfinal	Semifinal	Final / BM	
Team	Event	Opposition Score	Opposition Score	Opposition Score	Rank	Opposition Score	Opposition Score	Opposition Score	Rank
United States men's	Men's tournament	Brazil; L 8–13	France; W 5–4	Iran; W 14–7	2 Q	Japan; L 4–6	—N/a	Iran; L 3–4	6

=== Men's tournament ===
The United States men's goalball team qualified for the paralympic games by virtue of the results at the 2023 Parapan American Games in Santiago, Chile.

Team roster

Coach: Keith Young

The following is the United States squad in the goalball tournament of the 2024 Summer Paralympics.

No.	Player	Class	Date of birth (age)
2	Tyler Merren	B2	29 May 1984 (aged 40)
3	Zion Walker	B3	5 November 2001 (aged 22)
4	Tre'shaun Faison	B2	30 July 2003 (aged 21)
6	Calahan Young	B2	23 February 1995 (aged 29)
7	Matt Simpson	B1	30 March 1990 (aged 34)
8	Christian King	B3	17 October 1999 (aged 24)

Group stage

Pos	Team	Pld	W	D	L	GF	GA	GD	Pts	Qualification
1	Brazil	3	2	1	0	28	20	+8	7	Quarter-finals
2	United States	3	2	0	1	27	24	+3	6	Quarter-finals
3	Iran	3	1	1	1	26	29	−3	4	Quarter-finals
4	France (H)	3	0	0	3	17	25	−8	0	Quarter-finals

Source: Paris 2024
(H) Hosts
30 August 2024
09:00

United States	8–13	Brazil
Young 5', 6', 7', 8', 12', 22'; Merren 7'; King 10'	Report	Moreno 3', 5', 6', 9', 14'; Ernesto 6', 10', 15'; Dantas 8', 13', 14'; Sousa 21'; Saturnino 22'

South Paris Arena, Paris
Referee:
Kazuto Ono (Japan)
Antonios Christodoulos (Greece)

31 August 2024
13:15

United States	5–4	France
King 0'; Merren 3', 13', 17'; Young 16'	Report	Baich 6', 18'; Ouni 14', 21'

South Paris Arena, Paris
Referee:
Janice Dawson (Canada)
Azhi Mahmood (Iraq)

1 September 2024
13:15

Iran	7–14	United States
Souri 8', 8', 9', 21', 21'; Jafari 16', 17'	Report	Young 0', 1', 7', 16', 18', 20'; Merren 3', 6'; King 6', 8', 9'; Simpson 11', 19', 21'

South Paris Arena, Paris
Referee:
Sarah Kuper (Germany)
Claude Dagenais (Canada)

Quarter-finals

2 September 2024
19:30

United States	4–6	Japan
Young 1', 16'; Merren 4', 16'	Report	Kaneko 2', 3', 21'; Miyajiki 9', 15', 15'

South Paris Arena, Paris
Referee:
Juha Vuokila (Finland)
Romualdas Vaitiekus (Lithuania)

Fifth place match

3 September 2024
10:45

United States	3–4	Iran
Merren 0'; King 16', 19'	Report	Jafari 3', 22'; Parnia Jomairan 3', 18'

South Paris Arena, Paris
Referee:
Azhi Mahmood (Iraq)
Claude Dagenais (Canada)

== Judo ==
United States entered two judokas to compete at the Paralympics competition. Christella Garcia and Maria Liana Mutia have qualified to compete.

Athlete	Event	Round of 16	Quarterfinal	Semifinal	Repechage	Final / BM	
Athlete	Event	Opposition Result	Opposition Result	Opposition Result	Opposition Result	Opposition Result	Rank
Maria Liana Mutia	Women's −57 kg J1	Bye	Gómez (ARG); W 10–00	Havrysiuk (UKR); W 01–00	Bye	Shi (CHN); L 00–11	2nd place, silver medalist(s)
Christella Garcia	Women's +70 kg J1	Bye	Tampubolon (INA); W 10–00	Harnyk (UKR); L 00–10	Bye	Bronze medal final Ismiyeva (AZE); W 10–00	3rd place, bronze medalist(s)

== Paracanoeing ==
United States earned quota places for the following events through the 2023 ICF Canoe Sprint World Championships in Duisburg, Germany.

Athlete	Event	Heat		Semifinal		Final	
Athlete	Event	Time	Rank	Time	Rank	Time	Rank
Blake Haxton	Men's VL2	55.59	2 SF	52.69	1 FA	51.81	3rd place, bronze medalist(s)
Jillian Elwart	Women's VL3	1:02.86	6 SF	1:01.56	4 FB	1:02.86	11

Qualifying legend: FA - Qualify to medal final; FB - Qualify to non-medal final; SF - Qualify to semifinal

== Paratriathlon ==
United States has qualified eighteen paratriathletes for the following events.

Men

Athlete	Event	Swim (750 m)	Trans 1	Bike (20 km)	Trans 2	Run (5 km)	Total time	Rank
Mark Barr	PTS2	10:46	1:43	34:18	0:58	19:48	1:07:33	3rd place, bronze medalist(s)
Mohamed Lahna	PTS2	12:09	1:15	33:00	0:52	20:02	1:07:18	2nd place, silver medalist(s)
Carson Clough	PTS4	10:42	1:07	31:05	0:30	17:23	1:00:47	2nd place, silver medalist(s)
Eric McElvenney	PTS4	11:52	1:15	32:32	1:09	18:58	1:05:46	9
Chris Hammer	PTS5	12:03	0:54	29:06	0:42	15:59	58:44	1st place, gold medalist(s)
Howie Sanborn	PTWC	14:24	1:36	34:06	0:46	18:49	1:02:19	9
Kyle Coon; Guide:Marty Andrie	PTVI	12:40	1:09	30:02	1:02	17:54	1:02:47	8
Owen Cravens; Guide:Ben Hoffman	PTVI	13:31	0:53	27:27	0:33	18:19	1:00:43	4

Women

Athlete	Event	Swim (750 m)	Trans 1	Bike (20 km)	Trans 2	Run (5 km)	Total time	Rank
Hailey Danz	PTS2	13:11	1:26	36:06	0:59	22:49	1:14:31	1st place, gold medalist(s)
Allysa Seely	PTS2	13:12	1:14	39:34	0:46	21:47	1:16:33	3rd place, bronze medalist(s)
Melissa Stockwell	PTS2	13:04	1:44	40:08	1:06	25:04	1:21:06	5
Kelly Elmlinger	PTS4	DNS						
Emma Meyers	PTS4	14:01	1:23	40:44	0:43	24:53	1:21:44	9
Rachel Watts	PTS4	24:01	1:41	42:45	1:14	32:34	1:42:15	13
Grace Norman	PTS5	11:32	1:15	32:50	0:47	18:16	1:04:40	1st place, gold medalist(s)
Kendall Gretsch	PTWC	16:19	1:13	36:28	0:33	13:13	1:07:46	2nd place, silver medalist(s)
Emelia Perry	PTWC	16:33	1:30	40:47	0:59	14:14	1:12:18	5

== Powerlifting ==
United States has qualified two powerlifters for the following Paralympics events.

Athlete	Event	Weight	Rank
Bobby Body	Men's –107 kg	218	4
Ashley Dyce	Women's +86 kg	112	8

== Rowing ==
United States rowers qualified boats in each of the following classes at the 2023 World Rowing Championships in Belgrade, Serbia.

Athlete	Event	Heat		Repechage		Final	
Athlete	Event	Time	Rank	Time	Rank	Time	Rank
Saige Harper; Todd Vogt	PR3 mixed double sculls	7:44.88	4 R	7:50.99	3 FB	7:48.38	7
Skylar Dahl; Emelie Eldracher (C); Alex Flynn; Ben Washburne; Gemma Wollenschlaeger	PR3 mixed coxed four	6:57.18	1 FA	Bye		6:58.59	2nd place, silver medalist(s)

Qualification legend: FA - Qualify for medal final; FB - Qualify for non-medal final; R - Qualify for repechage

== Shooting ==
United States entered six para-shooter's after achieved quota places for the following events by virtue of their best finishes at the 2022, 2023 and 2024 world cup, 2022 World Championships, 2023 World Championships and 2023 Parapan American Games, as long as they obtained a minimum qualifying score (MQS) by July 15, 2024.

Athlete	Event	Qualification		Final	
Athlete	Event	Points	Rank	Points	Rank
Marco de la Rosa	Men's 10 m air pistol SH1	550-9x	22	Did not advance	
Yan Xiao Gong	Men's 10 m air pistol SH1	557-12x	16	Did not advance	
Marco de la Rosa	Mixed 25 m pistol SH1	559-10x	16	Did not advance	
Yan Xiao Gong	Mixed 25 m pistol SH1	573-10x	4 Q	28	2nd place, silver medalist(s)
Yan Xiao Gong	Mixed 50 m pistol SH1	534-5x	7 Q	96.6	8
Kevin Nguyen	Mixed 10 m air rifle prone SH1	628.4	27	Did not advance	
Jazmin Almlie	Mixed 10 m air rifle standing SH2	620.9	26	Did not advance	
McKenna Geer	Mixed 10 m air rifle standing SH2	626.1	23	Did not advance	
Jazmin Almlie	Mixed 10 m air rifle prone SH2	630.1	27	Did not advance	
McKenna Geer	Mixed 10 m air rifle prone SH2	626.4	33	Did not advance	
John Joss III	Mixed 50 m rifle prone SH1	619.2	14	Did not advance	
Kevin Nguyen	Mixed 50 m rifle prone SH1	618.6	15	Did not advance	
McKenna Geer	Mixed 50 m rifle prone SH2	619.9	13	Did not advance	

== Sitting volleyball ==
Summary

Team	Event	Group Stage				Semifinal	Final / BM	
Team	Event	Opposition Score	Opposition Score	Opposition Score	Rank	Opposition Score	Opposition Score	Rank
United States women	Women's tournament	China; L 1–3	France; W 3–0	Italy; W 3–0	2 Q	Brazil; W 3–1	China; W 3–1	1st place, gold medalist(s)

=== Women's tournament ===
United States entered the paralympic games in women's event by winning the 2023 Pan American Sitting Volleyball Championships held in Edmonton, Canada.

Team roster

- Katie Holloway Bridge
- Whitney Dosty
- Tia Edwards
- Heather Erickson
- Kaleo Kanahele Maclay
- Monique Matthews
- Nicky Nieves
- Sydney Satchell
- Emma Schieck
- Alexis Shifflett-Patterson
- Lora Webster
- Bethany Zummo

Group play

Pos	Team	Pld	W	L	Pts	SW	SL	SR	SPW	SPL	SPR	Qualification
1	China	3	3	0	3	9	1	9.000	247	147	1.680	Semifinals
2	United States	3	2	1	2	7	3	2.333	237	167	1.419	Semifinals
3	Italy	3	1	2	1	3	6	0.500	177	171	1.035	Fifth place match
4	France (H)	3	0	3	0	0	9	0.000	49	225	0.218	Seventh place match

Source: Paris 2024
(H) Host

30 August 2024; 12:00	United States	1–3	China	North Paris Arena, Paris; Attendance: 2,833; Referees: Slavisa Kuzmanovic (BIH), Ayan Rakhmetov (KAZ)
30 August 2024; 12:00	(25–21, 20–25, 18–25, 24–26); P2 Report			North Paris Arena, Paris; Attendance: 2,833; Referees: Slavisa Kuzmanovic (BIH), Ayan Rakhmetov (KAZ)

1 September 2024; 20:15	France	0–3	United States	North Paris Arena, Paris; Attendance: 3,874; Referees: Mahdi Navidino (IRN), Neal Konowalyk (GER)
1 September 2024; 20:15	(5–25, 1–25, 5–25); P2 Report			North Paris Arena, Paris; Attendance: 3,874; Referees: Mahdi Navidino (IRN), Neal Konowalyk (GER)

3 September 2024; 14:00	United States	3–0	Italy	North Paris Arena, Paris; Attendance: 2,275; Referees: Spela Plesnik (SLO), Marie-Claude Richer (CAN)
3 September 2024; 14:00	(25–21, 25–23, 25–15); P2 Report			North Paris Arena, Paris; Attendance: 2,275; Referees: Spela Plesnik (SLO), Marie-Claude Richer (CAN)

Semifinals

5 September 2024; 18:00	Brazil	1–3	United States	North Paris Arena, Paris; Attendance: 2,575; Referees: Slavisa Kuzmanovic (BIH), Philippe Dauchel (FRA)
5 September 2024; 18:00	(22–25, 25–22, 14–25, 15–25); P2 Report			North Paris Arena, Paris; Attendance: 2,575; Referees: Slavisa Kuzmanovic (BIH), Philippe Dauchel (FRA)

Gold medal match

7 September 2024; 19:30	China	1–3	United States	North Paris Arena, Paris; Attendance: 4,089; Referees: Marie-Claude Richer (CAN), Krisztina Arpas (HUN)
7 September 2024; 19:30	(21–25, 25–23, 20–25, 22–25); P2 Report			North Paris Arena, Paris; Attendance: 4,089; Referees: Marie-Claude Richer (CAN), Krisztina Arpas (HUN)

== Swimming ==
United States secured eight quotas at the 2023 World Para Swimming Championships after finishing in the top two places in Paralympic class disciplines.

Men

Athlete	Event	Heat		Final	
Athlete	Event	Result	Rank	Result	Rank
Abbas Karimi	50 m freestyle S5	34.58	9	Did not advance	
Jamal Hill	50 m freestyle S9	25.34	3 Q	25.62	5
Yaseen El-Demerdash	50 m freestyle S10	25.29	9	Did not advance	
Noah Jaffe	100 m freestyle S8	58.94	2 Q	58.25 AM	2nd place, silver medalist(s)
Matthew Torres	100 m freestyle S8	1:01.81	=15	Did not advance	
Evan Wilkerson	100 m freestyle S12	1:00.56	15	Did not advance	
Yaseen El-Demerdash	100 m freestyle S10	55.93	10	Did not advance	
Evan Austin	400 m freestyle S7	4:56.54	1 Q	4:48.91	4
Noah Jaffe	400 m freestyle S8	4:26.80	2 Q	4:25.07	4
Matthew Torres	400 m freestyle S8	4:32.75	3 Q	4:32.35	5
Jack O'Neil	100 m backstroke S8	1:11.09	11	Did not advance	
Matthew Torres	100 m backstroke S8	1:11.72	12	Did not advance	
Yaseen El-Demerdash	100 m backstroke S10	1:04.58	9	Did not advance	
Evan Wilkerson	100 m backstroke S12	1:06.00	9	Did not advance	
Morgan Ray	100 m breaststroke SB6	1:22.86	3 Q	1:21.99	4
Zachary Shattuck	100 m breaststroke SB6	1:25.86	8 Q	1:25.11	6
David Abrahams	100 m breastroke SB13	1:06.76	5 Q	1:06.63	5
Abbas Karimi	50 m butterfly S5	38.37	9	Did not advance	
Zachary Shattuck	50 m butterfly S6	34.41	9	Did not advance	
Evan Austin	50 m butterfly S7	29.90	2 Q	29.89	4
Noah Jaffe	100 m butterfly S8	1:05.34	5 Q	1:05.26	6
Yaseen El-Demerdash	100 m butterfly S10	1:01.88	12	Did not advance	
Evan Wilkerson	100 m butterfly S12	1:05.60	13	Did not advance	
Lawrence Sapp	100 m butterfly S14	1:00.28	13	Did not advance	
Morgan Ray	200 individual medley SM6	2:58.66	12	Did not advance	
Zachary Shattuck	200 individual medley SM6	2:51.92	9	Did not advance	
Evan Austin	200 m individual medley SM7	2:40.26	5 Q	2:35.63	6
Noah Jaffe	200 m individual medley SM8	2:30.96	8 Q	2:29.25	6
David Abrahams	200 m individual medley SM13	2:17.81	7 Q	2:16.95	6

Women

Athlete	Event	Heat		Final	
Athlete	Event	Result	Rank	Result	Rank
Leanne Smith	50 m freestyle S4	40.72	2 Q	40.03 WR	1st place, gold medalist(s)
Elizabeth Marks	50 m freestyle S6	33.05	2 Q	32.90 AM	2nd place, silver medalist(s)
McKenzie Coan	50 m freestyle S8	33.93	12	Did not advance	
Mallory Weggemann	50 m freestyle S8	32.97	8 Q	33.43	8
Christie Raleigh Crossley	50 m freestyle S10	27.28 WR	1 Q	27.38	2nd place, silver medalist(s)
Anastasia Pagonis	50 m freestyle S11	31.01	8 Q	31.08	8
Olivia Chambers	50 m freestyle S13	28.12	6 Q	27.65	5
Grace Nuhfer	50 m freestyle S13	28.09	5 Q	28.22	8
Gia Pergolini	50 m freestyle S13	27.52	2 Q	27.51	2nd place, silver medalist(s)
Leanne Smith	100 m freestyle S3	1:32.63	1 Q	1:28.81 PR	1st place, gold medalist(s)
McKenzie Coan	100 m freestyle S7	1:11.38	3 Q	1:11.58	5
Elizabeth Marks	100 m freestyle S7	1:10.98 PR	2 Q	1:11.32	4
Morgan Stickney	100 m freestyle S7	1:10.35	1 Q	1:10.11	2nd place, silver medalist(s)
Hannah Aspden	100 m freestyle S9	1:06.83	11	Did not advance	
Christie Raleigh Crossley	100 m freestyle S9	1:01.37	2 Q	1:00.18 AM	2nd place, silver medalist(s)
Natalie Sims	100 m freestyle S9	1:02.94	3 Q	1:04.19	5
Alexandra Truwit	100 m freestyle S10	1:02.80	11	Did not advance	
Anastasia Pagonis	100 m freestyle S11	1:08.13	4 Q	1:09.31	7
McKenzie Coan	400 m freestyle S7	5:09.98	2 Q	5:10.34	2nd place, silver medalist(s)
Ahalya Lettenberger	400 m freestyle S7	5:24.12	6 Q	5:23.73	5
Morgan Stickney	400 m freestyle S7	4:56.69 PR	1 Q	4:53.88 PR	1st place, gold medalist(s)
Jessica Long	400 m freestyle S8	4:53.43	1 Q	4:48.74	1st place, gold medalist(s)
Keegan Knott	400 m freestyle S9	4:56.81	10	Did not advance	
Summer Schmit	400 m freestyle S9	4:56.77	9	Did not advance	
Alexandra Truwit	400 m freestyle S10	4:34.71	1 Q	4:31.39	2nd place, silver medalist(s)
Taylor Winnett	400 m freestyle S10	4:52.58	7 Q	4:55.29	8
Anastasia Pagonis	400 m freestyle S11	5:04.60	1 Q	5:05.31	4
Olivia Chambers	400 m freestyle S13	4:33.28	1 Q	4:29.93	1st place, gold medalist(s)
Elizabeth Marks	100 m backstroke S6	1:20.83	1 Q	1:20.34	2nd place, silver medalist(s)
Jessica Long	100 m backstroke S8	1:20.83	5 Q	1:21.28	6
Hannah Aspden	100 m backstroke S9	1:12.74	5 Q	1:12.77	6
Christie Raleigh Crossley	100 m backstroke S9	1:10.28	1 Q	1:074.92 PR	1st place, gold medalist(s)
Elizabeth Smith	100 m backstroke S9	1:13.64	8 Q	1:13.37	8
Alexandra Truwit	100 m backstroke S10	1:09.57	2 Q	1:08.59	2nd place, silver medalist(s)
Taylor Winnett	100 m backstroke S10	1:15.18	10	Did not advance	
Grace Nuhfer	100 m backstroke S13	1:11.61	5 Q	1.13.35	8
Gia Pergolini	100 m backstroke S13	1:05.43	1 Q	1:04.93	1st place, gold medalist(s)
Leanne Smith	50 m breaststroke SB3	1:06.82	7 Q	WD	
Ahalya Lettenberger	100 m breaststroke SB6	—N/a		1:47.72	6
Summer Schmit	100 m breaststroke SB9	1:29.56	10	Did not advance	
Olivia Chambers	100 m breaststroke SB13	1:18.92	2 Q	1:17.70	2nd place, silver medalist(s)
Colleen Young	100 m breaststroke SB13	1:19.65	4 Q	1:18.52	3rd place, bronze medalist(s)
Elizabeth Marks	50 m butterfly S6	37.89	2 Q	38.79	7
McKenzie Coan	50 m butterfly S7	40.03	13	Did not advance	
Julia Gaffney	50 m butterfly S7	37.03	5 Q	37.22	6
Mallory Weggemann	50 m butterfly S7	35.72	2 Q	34.94	2nd place, silver medalist(s)
Jessica Long	100 m butterfly S8	1:11.36	1 Q	1:10.59	1st place, gold medalist(s)
Christie Raleigh Crossley	100 m butterfly S9	1:06.78	1 Q	1:05.19 PR	1st place, gold medalist(s)
Elizabeth Smith	100 m butterfly S9	1:10.47	5 Q	1:09.32	6
Taylor Winnett	100 m butterfly S10	1:09.51	7 Q	1:11.52	8
Olivia Chambers	100 m butterfly S13	1:06.79	6 Q	1:06.32	5
Grace Nuhfer	100 m butterfly S13	1:03.95	1 Q	1:03.88	2nd place, silver medalist(s)
Gia Pergolini	100 m butterfly S13	1:08.58	12	Did not advance	
Leanne Smith	150 individual medley SM4	3:28.17	9	Did not advance	
Elizabeth Marks	200 m individual medley SM6	3:00.26	2 Q	3:02.50	2nd place, silver medalist(s)
Julia Gaffney	200 m individual medley SM7	3:03.03	4 Q	3:01.27	3rd place, bronze medalist(s)
Morgan Stickney	200 m individual medley SM7	3:04.70	6 Q	3:04.62	7
Mallory Weggemann	200 m individual medley SM7	2:57.40	1 Q	2:53.29 PR	1st place, gold medalist(s)
Jessica Long	200 m individual medley SM8	2:45.97	4 Q	2:45.70	4
Summer Schmit	200 m individual medley SM9	2:44.63	10	Did not advance	
Natalie Sims	200 m individual medley SM9	2:40.60	3 Q	2:40.02	6
Taylor Winnett	200 m individual medley SM10	2:46.62	11	Did not advance	
Olivia Chambers	200 m individual medley SM13	2:27.72	1 Q	2:25.90	2nd place, silver medalist(s)
Grace Nuhfer	200 m individual medley SM13	2:31.89	6 Q	2:32.82	6
Colleen Young	200 m individual medley SM13	2:35.58	7 Q	2:34.95	7

Mixed

Athlete	Event	Heat		Final	
Athlete	Event	Time	Rank	Time	Rank
Abbas Karimi; Elizabeth Marks; Zachary Shattuck; Leanne Smith	4 × 50 m freestyle relay 20 pts	2:23.01	1 Q	2:18.99 AM	2nd place, silver medalist(s)
Noah Jaffe; Christie Raleigh Crossley; Natalie Sims; Matthew Torres	4 × 100 m freestyle relay 34 pts	—N/a		4:04.70 AM	3rd place, bronze medalist(s)
David Abrahams; Olivia Chambers; Anastasia Pagonis; Evan Wilkerson	4 × 100 m freestyle relay 49 pts	—N/a		4:05.26	5
Abbas Karimi; Elizabeth Marks; Morgan Ray; Leanne Smith	4 × 50 m medley relay 20 pts	2:35.81	1 Q	2:31.01 AM	2nd place, silver medalist(s)
Hannah Aspden; Yaseen El-Demerdash; Christie Raleigh Crossley; Morgan Ray	4 × 100 m medley relay 34 pts	4:36.75 AM	4 Q	4:33.65 AM	6

== Table tennis ==
The United States secured three singles spot for the Paralympic games. All of them qualified for Paris 2024 by virtue of their gold medal results, in their respective class, through the 2023 Parapan American Games in Santiago, Chile.

Athlete	Event	Round of 32	Round of 16	Quarterfinals	Semifinals	Final / BM	
Athlete	Event	Opposition Result	Opposition Result	Opposition Result	Opposition Result	Opposition Result	Rank
Jenson Van Emburgh	Men's individual C3	Bye	Noël (FRA); W 3–1	Jang (KOR); L 2–3	Did not advance		=5
Ian Seidenfeld	Men's individual C6	—N/a	Perry (GBR); W 3–0	Valera (ESP); W 3–0	Parenzan (ITA); L 0–3	Did not advance	3rd place, bronze medalist(s)
Tahl Leibovitz	Men's individual C9	—N/a	Mai (UKR); L 0–3	Did not advance			=9
Tahl Leibovitz; Ian Seidenfeld	Men's doubles MD18	Liu / Zhao (CHN); L 0–3	Did not advance				17

== Taekwondo ==
United States entered two athletes to compete at the Paralympics competition. Evan Medell qualified for Paris 2024, by virtue of finishing within the top six in the Paralympic rankings in men's above 80 kg class.

Athlete	Event	Round of 16	Quarterfinal	Semifinal	Repechage	Final / BM	
Athlete	Event	Opposition Result	Opposition Result	Opposition Result	Opposition Result	Opposition Result	Rank
Evan Medell	Men's +80 kg	Bye	Omirali (KAZ); W 13–3	Ramazanov (NPA); L 17–19	Bye	Bronze medal final Keita (SEN); W 13–1	3rd place, bronze medalist(s)
Ariana Aguila	Women's 52 kg	Japaridze (GEO); L 2–22	Did not advance				=9

== Wheelchair basketball ==
Summary

Team	Event	Preliminary round				Quarterfinal	Semifinal	Final / BM	
Team	Event	Opposition Score	Opposition Score	Opposition Score	Rank	Opposition Score	Opposition Score	Opposition Score	Rank
United States men	Men's tournament	Spain; W 66–56	Netherlands; W 60–34	Australia; W 79–69	1	France; W 82–47	Canada; W 80–43	Great Britain; W 73–69	1st place, gold medalist(s)
United States women	Women's tournament	Germany; W 73–44	Netherlands; L 56–69	Japan; W 62–52	2	Great Britain; W 59–52	China; W 50–47	Netherlands; L 49–63	2nd place, silver medalist(s)

=== Men's tournament ===
United States men's team qualified to compete by virtue of the gold medal results at the 2023 Parapan American Games in Santiago, Chile.

Team roster
The following is the United States roster in the men's wheelchair basketball tournament of the 2024 Summer Paralympics.

United States men's national wheelchair basketball team - 2024 Summer Paralympics roster
Players
Coaches

No.	Name	Age – Date of birth	Pts.
2	Jacob Williams	33 – 2 August 1991	2.5
4	Talen Jourdan	24 – 25 October 1999	1.0
8	Brian Bell	35 – 24 February 1989	4.5
11	Steve Serio	36 – 8 September 1987	3.5
14	Paul Schulte	45 – 5 March 1979	3.0
15	Nate Hinze	36 – 12 June 1988	4.5
16	Trevon Jenifer	35 – 7 September 1988	2.5
24	AJ Fitzpatrick	19 – 28 August 2004	3.0
25	Jorge Salazar	34 – 7 December 1989	3.5
32	Fabian Romo	27 – 22 January 1997	4.0
33	John Boie	33 – 11 February 1991	1.0
44	Jeromie Meyer	27 – 11 April 1997	2.0

Head coach

Robb Taylor

Assistant coach(es)

Scott Meyer

Legend

- Age - describes age on 28 August 2024

Preliminary round

Pos	Team	Pld	W	L	PF	PA	PD	Pts	Qualification
1	United States	3	3	0	202	159	+43	6	Quarter-finals
2	Spain	3	2	1	192	179	+13	5	Quarter-finals
3	Netherlands	3	1	2	153	183	−30	4	Quarter-finals
4	Australia	3	0	3	184	210	−26	3	Quarter-finals

Source: Paris 2024
Rules for classification: 1) Points; 2) Head-to-head results; 3) Points difference; 4) Points scored.

29 August 2024
16:00

Report

United States	66–56	Spain
Scoring by quarter: 18–17, 14–12, 14–11, 20–16
Pts: Williams 22; Rebs: Serio 11; Asts: Serio 12		Pts: Ortega 17; Rebs: Sánchez, Lorenzo 8 Asts: Ortega 6

Bercy Arena, Paris
Attendance: 12.682
Referees: Shu-Fei Hsieh

31 August 2024
16:00

Report

Netherlands	34–60	United States
Scoring by quarter: 4–17, 15–12, 13–14, 2–17
Pts: Op den Orth 26; Rebs: Op den Orth 9 Asts: Poggenwisch 10		Pts: Bell 18; Rebs: Bell 11; Asts: Serio 8

Bercy Arena, Paris
Attendance: 12.741
Referees: Cristian Colombatti

1 September 2024
10:30

Report

Australia	69–76	United States
Scoring by quarter: 21–22, 18–23, 18–23, 12–8
Pts: O'Neill-Thorne 14; Rebs: Latham 9 Asts: Leard, Knowles 5		Pts: Williams 24; Rebs: Bell, Fitzpatrick 5 Asts: Serio 9

Bercy Arena, Paris
Attendance: 12.679
Referees: Tomáš Pajer

Quarterfinal

3 September 2024
21:30

Report

United States	82–47	France
Scoring by quarter: 24-12, 17-15, 27-10, 14-10
Pts: Williams 23; Rebs: Bell 14; Asts: Williams 10		Pts: Carlier 11; Rebs: Carlier 10; Asts: Ramonet 5

Bercy Arena, Paris
Attendance: 12,652
Referees: Blaine Krapljanov

Semifinal

5 September 2024
21:30

Report

United States	80–43	Canada
Scoring by quarter: 15–16, 25–16, 19–7, 21–4
Pts: Bell 31; Rebs: Bell 10; Asts: Williams 11		Pts: Anderson 16; Rebs: Anderson 6 Asts: Higgins 7

Bercy Arena, Paris
Attendance: 12.524
Referees: Linas Radykas

Gold medal game

7 September 2024
21:30

Report

Great Britain	69–73	United States
Scoring by quarter: 18–23, 13–15, 12–15, 26–20
Pts: Manning 21; Rebs: Manning 16; Asts: Pratt 16		Pts: Williams 26; Rebs: Serio 10; Asts: Serio, Williams 8

Bercy Arena, Paris
Attendance: 12,611
Referees: Sébastien Gauthier

=== Women's tournament ===
United States women's team qualified to compete by virtue of the gold medal results at the 2023 Parapan American Games in Santiago, Chile.

Team roster
The following is the United States roster in the women's wheelchair basketball tournament of the 2024 Summer Paralympics.

United States women's national wheelchair basketball team - 2024 Summer Paralympics roster
Players
Coaches

No.	Name	Age – Date of birth	Pts.
1	Alejandra Ibáñez	24 – 26 January 2000	2.5
4	Abigail Bauleke	23 – 31 July 2001	1.5
7	Josie Aslakson	28 – 14 September 1995	1.0
8	Natalie Schneider	41 – 11 February 1983	4.5
12	Rebecca Murray	34 – 15 March 1990	2.5
15	Rose Hollermann	28 – 25 December 1995	3.5
21	Kaitlyn Eaton	30 – 17 August 1994	1.5
24	Lindsey Zurbrugg	25 – 22 September 1998	2.5
34	Emily Oberst	26 – 27 August 1998	4.5
43	Bailey Moody	22 – 16 November 2001	4.0
54	Ixhelt Gonzalez	20 – 1 June 2004	4.5
55	Courtney Ryan	33 – 21 September 1990	2.0

Head coach

Robert Taylor

Assistant coach(es)

Scott Meyer

Legend

- Age - describes age on 28 August 2024

Preliminary round

Pos	Team	Pld	W	L	PF	PA	PD	Pts	Qualification
1	Netherlands	3	3	0	224	138	+86	6	Quarter-finals
2	United States	3	2	1	191	165	+26	5	Quarter-finals
3	Germany	3	1	2	159	196	−37	4	Quarter-finals
4	Japan	3	0	3	141	216	−75	3	Quarter-finals

Source: Paris 2024
Rules for classification: 1) Points; 2) Head-to-head results; 3) Points difference; 4) Points scored.

30 August 2024
16:00

Report

Germany	44–73	United States
Scoring by quarter: 10-16, 10-25, 8-16, 16-16
Pts: Miller 21; Rebs: Passiwan 10; Asts: Miller 8		Pts: Ryan 17; Rebs: Murray, Hollermann 6 Asts: Murray 12

Bercy Arena, Paris
Attendance: 12.726
Referees: Fengqin Wang

31 August 2024
18:15

Report

Netherlands	69–56	United States
Scoring by quarter: 15–16, 17–12, 18–12, 19–16
Pts: Beijer 34; Rebs: Beijer 12; Asts: Kramer 8		Pts: Hollermann 21; Rebs: González 10; Asts: Zurbrugg 9

Bercy Arena, Paris
Attendance: 12.741
Referees: Sebastien Gauthier

2 September 2024
13:45

Report

United States	62–52	Japan
Scoring by quarter: 22–12, 12–11, 18–13, 10–16
Pts: Ryan 16; Rebs: Zurbrugg 7 Asts: Murray, Zurbrugg 8		Pts: Kitada 16; Rebs: Amimoto 12; Asts: Amimoto 7

Bercy Arena, Paris
Attendance: 8.891
Referees: Linas Radykas

Quarterfinal

4 September 2024
16:00

Report

United States	59–52	Great Britain
Scoring by quarter: 12-12, 19-12, 13-17, 15-11
Pts: Gonzalez 16; Rebs: Hollermann 13; Asts: Zurbrugg, Ryan 6		Pts: Atkin 15; Rebs: Love 18; Asts: Love 9

Bercy Arena, Paris
Attendance: 12,550
Referees: Blaine Krapljanov

Semifinal

6 September 2024
16:00

Report

China	47–50	United States
Scoring by quarter: 14–12, 12–11, 10–17, 11–10
Pts: Lin 15; Rebs: X. Zhang, Lyu 8 Asts: Lin 10		Pts: Hollermann 20; Rebs: Murray 9 Asts: Hollermann, Zurbrugg 6

Bercy Arena, Paris
Attendance: 12.527
Referees: Drazen Strok

Gold medal game

8 September 2024
13:45

Report

Netherlands	63–49	United States
Scoring by quarter: 8–12, 23–12, 17–13, 15–12
Pts: Kramer 23; Rebs: Kramer 12; Asts: De Rooij 7		Pts: Hollermann 17; Rebs: Hollermann 8 Asts: Zurbrugg 7

Bercy Arena, Paris
Attendance: 12.629
Referees: Céline Villard

== Wheelchair fencing ==
United States has qualified six wheelchair fencers for the following Paralympics events.

Men

Athlete	Event	Round of 32	Round of 16	Quarterfinal	Semifinal	Repechage 1	Repechage 2	Repechage 3	Repechage 4	Final / BM	
Athlete	Event	Opposition Result	Opposition Result	Opposition Result	Opposition Result	Opposition Result	Opposition Result	Opposition Result	Opposition Result	Opposition Result	Rank
William Schoonover	Individual épée A	de Oliveira (BRA); W 15–7	Gilliver (GBR); L 1–15	Did not advance		Al-Ogaili (IRQ); L 6–15	Did not advance				16
Noah Hanssen	Individual épée B	Bye	Coutya (GBR); L 7–15	Did not advance		Datsko (UKR); L 6–15	Did not advance				16
Byron Branch; Noah Hanssen; William Schoonover	Team épée	—N/a	Brazil (BRA); L 24–45	Did not advance		—N/a				Did not advance	10
Byron Branch	Individual foil A	Schoonover (USA); W 15–2	Lambertini (ITA); L 5–15	Did not advance		Lam-Watson (GBR); L 7–15	Did not advance				15
William Schoonover	Individual foil A	Branch (USA); L 2–15	Did not advance								18
Byron Branch; Noah Hanssen; William Schoonover	Team foil	—N/a	Brazil (BRA); L 41–45	Did not advance		—N/a				Did not advance	9
William Schoonover	Individual sabre A	—N/a	Schmidt (GER); L 3–15	Did not advance		Damasceno (BRA); L 13–15	Did not advance				13
Noah Hanssen	Individual sabre B	—N/a	Feng (CHN); L 4–15	Did not advance		Hugo (ARG); W 15–5	Coutya (GBR); L 5–15	Did not advance			10

Women

Athlete	Event	Round of 32	Round of 16	Quarterfinal	Semifinal	Repechage 1	Repechage 2	Repechage 3	Repechage 4	Final / BM	
Athlete	Event	Opposition Result	Opposition Result	Opposition Result	Opposition Result	Opposition Result	Opposition Result	Opposition Result	Opposition Result	Opposition Result	Rank
Victoria Isaacson	Individual épée A	Veras (BRA); L 12–15	Did not advance								18
Jataya Taylor	Individual épée A	Oliveira (BRA); W 15–5	Kwon (KOR); L 7–15	Did not advance		Yu (HKG); L 9–15	Did not advance				15
Elien Geddes	Individual épée B	—N/a	Ao (CHN); L 2–15	Did not advance		Santos (BRA); W 15–14	Fedota-Isaieva (UKR); L 4–15	Did not advance			10
Elien Geddes; Victoria Isaacson; Jataya Taylor	Team épée	—N/a	Hong Kong (HKG); L 36–45	Did not advance		—N/a				Did not advance	11
Victoria Isaacson	Individual foil A	Bye	Mogoș (ITA); L 0–15	Did not advance		Fan (HKG); L 3–15	Did not advance				14
Jataya Taylor	Individual foil A	Baek (KOR); W 15–5	Yu (HKG); L 10–15	Did not advance		Morkvych (UKR); L 1–15	Did not advance				15
Elien Geddes	Individual foil B	—N/a	Doloh (UKR); L 11–15	Did not advance		Bye	Khetsuriani (GEO); L 6–15	Did not advance			10
Elien Geddes; Victoria Isaacson; Jataya Taylor	Team foil	—N/a	Bye	Italy (ITA); L 16–45	Did not advance	—N/a				Did not advance	6

== Wheelchair rugby ==
United States has qualified to compete at the Paralympic games, by virtue of their gold medal results, at the 2023 Parapan American Games in Santiago, Chile.

Summary

Team	Group Stage				Semifinal	Final / BM	
Team	Opposition Score	Opposition Score	Opposition Score	Rank	Opposition Score	Opposition Score	Rank
United States national team	Canada; W 51–48	Japan; L 42–45	Germany; W 57–47	2 Q	Great Britain; W 50–43	Japan; L 41–48	2nd place, silver medalist(s)

Team roster

- Sarah Adam
- Chuck Aoki
- Clayton Brackett
- Jeff Butler
- Lee Fredette
- Brad Hudspeth
- Chuck Melton
- Eric Newby
- Josh O'Neill
- Zion Redington
- Mason Symons
- Josh Wheeler

Group stage

Pos	Team	Pld	W	D	L	GF	GA	GD	Pts	Qualification
1	Japan	3	3	0	0	150	132	+18	6	Semi-finals
2	United States	3	2	0	1	150	140	+10	4	Semi-finals
3	Canada	3	1	0	2	148	148	0	2	Playoff rounds
4	Germany	3	0	0	3	138	166	−28	0	Playoff rounds

Source: Paris 2024
29 August 2024
13:30

United States	51–48	Canada
Chuck Aoki – 21; Josh Wheeler – 11; Sarah Adam – 6 Eric Newby – 3 Josh O'Neill – 2 Chuck Melton – 1 Jeff Butler – 1 Lee Fredette – 1	Report	Zak Madell – 31; Cody Caldwell – 5 Rio Kanda Kovac – 3 Mike Whitehead – 3 Trevor Hirschfield – 3 Anthony Létourneau – 2

Grand Palais Éphémère, Paris

30 August 2024
13:30

United States	42–45	Japan
Chuck Aoki – 19; Sarah Adam – 9 Josh Wheeler – 6 Josh O'Neill – 3 Mason Symons – 2 Chuck Melton – 1 Lee Fredette – 1	Report	Katsuya Hashimoto – 18; Yukinobu Ike – 12; Daisuke Ikezaki – 4 Hitoshi Ogawa – 4 Shunya Nakamachi – 3 Seiya Norimatsu – 1

Grand Palais Éphémère, Paris

31 August 2024
11:30

Germany	47–57	United States
Marco Herbst – 18; Josco Wilke – 15; Steffen Wecke – 9 Jens Sauerbier – 1 Britta Kripke – 1 Michael Volter – 1	Report	Chuck Aoki – 34; Sarah Adam – 13; Josh Wheeler – 6 Mason Symons – 4

Grand Palais Éphémère, Paris

Semifinal

1 September 2024
19:30

Great Britain	43–50	United States
Stuart Robinson – 15; Jamie Stead – 7 Aaron Phipps – 7 Jack Smith – 3 Kieran Flynn – 2 Tyler Walker – 2	Report	Chuck Aoki – 18; Josh Wheeler – 14; Sarah Adam – 13; Lee Fredette – 1 Clayton Brackett – 1 Jeff Butler – 1 Mason Symons – 1

Grand Palais Éphémère, Paris

Gold medal match

2 September 2024
19:30

Japan	48–41	United States
Katsuya Hashimoto – 19; Yukinobu Ike – 16; Seiya Norimatsu – 3	Report	Sarah Adam – 14; Chuck Aoki – 14; Josh Wheeler – 7 Eric Newby – 3 Clayton Brackett – 2 Lee Fredette – 1 Mason Symons – 1 Josh O'Neill – 1

Grand Palais Éphémère, Paris

== Wheelchair tennis ==
United States entered one player into the Paralympics by virtue of the gold medal results at the 2023 Parapan American Games in Santiago, Chile. And also qualified three wheelchair tennis players via the ITF world rankings as at 15 July 2024.

Men

Athlete	Event	Round of 64	Round of 32	Round of 16	Quarterfinals	Semifinals	Final / BM	
Athlete	Event	Opposition Result	Opposition Result	Opposition Result	Opposition Result	Opposition Result	Opposition Result	Rank
Casey Ratzlaff	Singles	Bye	Rodrigues (BRA); L 2–6, 6–7^{(2–6)}	Did not advance				=17
Conner Stroud	Singles	Gil (CRC); W 6–3, 6–1	Sanada (JPN); L 1–6, 2–6	Did not advance				=17
Casey Ratzlaff; Conner Stroud	Doubles	—N/a	Casco / Fernández (ARG); L 3–6, 4–6	Did not advance				=17

Women

Athlete	Event	Round of 32	Round of 16	Quarterfinals	Semifinals	Final / BM	
Athlete	Event	Opposition Result	Opposition Result	Opposition Result	Opposition Result	Opposition Result	Rank
Dana Mathewson	Singles	Li (CHN); L 7–5, 3–6, 4–6	Did not advance				=17
Maylee Phelps	Singles	Breakwell (GBR); W 6–3, 6–4	Wang (CHN); L 0–6, 3–6	Did not advance			=9
Dana Mathewson; Maylee Phelps	Doubles	—N/a	Ohtani / Takamuro (JPN); L 6–4, 4–6, [6–10]	Did not advance			=9

Quads

Athlete	Event	Round of 16	Quarterfinals	Semifinals	Final / BM	
Athlete	Event	Opposition Result	Opposition Result	Opposition Result	Opposition Result	Rank
David Wagner	Singles	Kaplan (TUR); L 1–6, 2–6	Did not advance			=9

== See also ==
- United States at the 2023 Parapan American Games
- United States at the 2024 Summer Olympics
- United States at the Paralympics
