= Cycling at the 2024 Summer Paralympics – Men's road time trial H4 =

Men's road time trial H4 at the XVII Paralympic Games
- Venue: Clichy-sous-Bois
- Dates: 4 September
- Competitors: 11 from 9 nations
- Winning time: 41:28.51

Medalists
1st place, gold medalist(s)		Jetze Plat	Netherlands
2nd place, silver medalist(s)		Thomas Fruehwirth	Austria
3rd place, bronze medalist(s)		Jonas van de Steene	Belgium

The Men's time trial H4 road cycling event at the 2024 Summer Paralympics took place on 4 September 2024, at Clichy-sous-Bois, Paris. 11 riders competed in the event.

The H4 classification is for handcyclists.

== Results ==
Rank	Rider	Nationality	Class	Time	Deficit
1st place, gold medalist(s)	Jetze Plat	Netherlands	H4	41:28.51	
2nd place, silver medalist(s)	Thomas Fruehwirth	Austria	H4	41:31.22	+0:02.71
3rd place, bronze medalist(s)	Jonas van de Steene	Belgium	H4	41:52.22	+0:23.71
4	Joseph Fritsch	France	H4	42:01.45	+0:32.94
5	Travis Gaertner	United States	H4	43:27.26	+1:58.75
6	Fabian Recher	Switzerland	H4	43:59.48	+2:30.97
7	Rafal Wilk	Poland	H4	44:41.85	+3:13.34
8	Alexander Gritsch	Austria	H4	45:11.96	+3:43.45
9	Matt Tingley	United States	H4	47:14.20	+5:45.69
10	Sumas Panalai	Thailand	H4	48:50.86	+7:22.35
11	Ulisses Freitas	Brazil	H4	49:39.70	+8:11.19
