= Cycling at the 2024 Summer Paralympics – Men's road race H4 =

Men's road race H4 at the XVII Paralympic Games
- Venue: Clichy-sous-Bois
- Dates: 5 September
- Competitors: 11 from 8 nations
- Winning time: 1:29:15

Medalists
1st place, gold medalist(s)		Jetze Plat	Netherlands
2nd place, silver medalist(s)		Thomas Frühwirth	Austria
3rd place, bronze medalist(s)		Rafał Wilk	Poland

The men's road race H4 cycling event at the 2024 Summer Paralympics took place on 5 September 2024 in Clichy-sous-Bois, Seine-Saint-Denis, Paris, France. 10 riders competed in the event.

== Schedule ==
F	Finals

Men's Road Race
Event↓/Date →	5 September	6 September	7 September
B		F	
H1-2	F		
H3	F		
H4	F		
H5	F		
C1-3			F
C4-5		F	
T1-2			F

== Results ==
Rank	Rider	Nationality	Class	Time	Gap	Notes
1st place, gold medalist(s)	Jetze Plat	Netherlands	(H4)	1:29:15		
2nd place, silver medalist(s)	Thomas Fruehwirth	Austria	(H4)	1:29:46	+0.31	
3rd place, bronze medalist(s)	Rafal Wilk	Poland	(H4)	1:34:50	+5:35	
4	Travis Gaertner	United States	(H4)	1:35:30	+6:15	
5	Fabian Recher	Switzerland	(H4)	1:35:56	+6:41	
6	Alexander Gritsch	Austria	(H4)	1:42:38	+13:23	
7	Ulisses Leal Freitas	Brazil	(H4)	1:45:42	+16:27	
8	Sumas Panalai	Thailand	(H4)	1:49:03	+19:48	
	Jonas van de Steene	Belgium	(H4)	DNF		
	Matt Tingley	United States	(H4)	DNF		
	Joseph Fritsch	France	(H4)	DNF		
