= Cycling at the 2024 Summer Paralympics =

Cycling at the XVII Paralympic Games
- Paralympic Cycling
- Venue: Clichy-sous-Bois (road); Vélodrome de Saint-Quentin-en-Yvelines (track)
- Dates: 29 August to 1 September (track); 4 to 7 September (road)
- Competitors: 220 from 50 nations

Cycling at the 2024 Summer Paralympics in Paris, France, took place in Clichy-sous-Bois in Seine-Saint-Denis for road cycling from 4 to 7 September, and track cycling was hosted at the Vélodrome de Saint-Quentin-en-Yvelines from 29 August to 1 September.

== Qualification ==
The qualification period ran from 1 January 2022 to 30 June 2024. In order to maintain their slots, NPCs must have at least one cyclist for each allocated slot to participate in at least one of the listed cycling competitions below.

Means of qualification	Date	Venue
2023 UCI Para-Cycling Road World Cup	20–24 April 2023	(Italy) Maniago
2023 UCI Para-Cycling Road World Cup	4–7 May 2023	(Belgium) Ostend
2023 UCI Para-Cycling Road World Cup	26–29 May 2023	(United States) Huntsville
2023 UCI Para-cycling Track World Championships	2–8 August 2023	(United Kingdom) Glasgow
2023 UCI Para-cycling Road World Championships	9–13 August 2023	(United Kingdom) Glasgow
2024 UCI Para-cycling Road World Cup	13–17 January 2024	(Australia) Adelaide
2024 UCI Para-cycling Road World Cup	TBA	
2024 UCI Para-cycling Road World Cup	TBA	
2024 UCI Para-cycling Track World Championships	20–24 March 2024	(Brazil) Rio de Janeiro

=== Qualified nations ===
As of June 2024.

- Argentina (4)
- Australia (9)
- Austria (6)
- Belgium (7)
- Brazil (6)
- Canada (7)
- Chile (1)
- China (8)
- Colombia (5)
- Czech Republic (4)
- Denmark (2)
- Dominican Republic (1)
- Finland (1)
- France (15) (Host nation)
- Germany (9)
- Ghana (1)
- Great Britain (17)
- Greece (1)
- Hungary (1)
- India (2)
- Indonesia (1)
- Ireland (5)
- Israel (1)
- Italy (12)
- Japan (5)
- Kenya (1)
- Latvia (1)
- Malaysia (3)
- Mexico (1)
- Morocco (1)
- Netherlands (10)
- New Zealand (6)
- Norway (3)
- Panama (1)
- Peru (1)
- Poland (5)
- Portugal (2)
- Romania (2)
- Slovakia (2)
- South Africa (1)
- South Korea (2)
- Spain (7)
- Sweden (3)
- Switzerland (7)
- Thailand (4)
- Ukraine (2)
- United Arab Emirates (1)
- United States (13)
- Uzbekistan (2)
- Venezuela (1)

== Medal table ==
The following is the complete medal table for all cycling events at the 2024 Summer Paralympics.

* Host nation (France)

Rank	NPC	Gold	Silver	Bronze	Total
1	France*	10	12	6	28
2	Netherlands	10	3	3	16
3	Great Britain	9	8	5	22
4	China	5	4	1	10
5	Australia	4	4	3	11
6	United States	4	1	3	8
7	Spain	2	3	3	8
8	Italy	1	2	5	8
9	Ireland	1	2	0	3
10	Germany	1	1	5	7
11	Ukraine	1	1	1	3
12	Denmark	1	0	1	2
13	Japan	1	0	0	1
13	Slovakia	1	0	0	1
15	Belgium	0	3	2	5
15	Switzerland	0	3	2	5
17	Austria	0	2	0	2
18	Canada	0	1	3	4
19	New Zealand	0	1	1	2
20	Colombia	0	0	2	2
20	Poland	0	0	2	2
22	Portugal	0	0	1	1
22	South Africa	0	0	1	1
22	Sweden	0	0	1	1
Totals (24 entries)		51	51	51	153

== Medalists ==
=== Road ===
==== Men's events ====
Event	Class	Gold		Silver		Bronze	
Road race	B	Netherlands; Tristan Bangma; Pilot: Patrick Bos	2:55:10	Netherlands; Vincent ter Schure; Pilot: Timo Fransen	2:55:12	France; Alexandre Lloveras; Pilot: Yoann Paillot	2:55:18
Road race	H1–2	Florian Jouanny; France	1:20:18	Sergio Garrote Muñoz; Spain	1:20:40	Luca Mazzone; Italy	1:27:58
Road race	H3	Mathieu Bosredon; France	1:34:36	Johan Quaile; France	1:35:57	Mirko Testa; Italy	1:39:38
Road race	H4	Jetze Plat; Netherlands	1:29:15	Thomas Frühwirth; Austria	1:29:46	Rafał Wilk; Poland	1:34:50
Road race	H5	Mitch Valize; Netherlands	1:33:12	Loïc Vergnaud; France	1:34:27	Pavlo Bal; Ukraine	1:37:03
Road race	C1–3	Finlay Graham; Great Britain	1:43:19	Thomas Peyroton-Dartet; France	1:43:19	Alexandre Léauté; France	1:43:43
Road race	C4–5	Yehor Dementyev; Ukraine	2:18:59	Kévin Le Cunff; France	2:18:59	Martin van de Pol; Netherlands	2:18:59
Road race	T1–2	Chen Jianxin; China	1:15:08	Dennis Connors; United States	1:17:09	Juan José Betancourt Quiroga; Colombia	1:17:09
Time trial	B	Netherlands; Tristan Bangma; Pilot: Patrick Bos	58.964	France; Elie de Carvalho; Pilot: Mickaël Guichard	59.312	Netherlands; Vincent ter Schure; Pilot: Timo Fransen	59.862
Time trial	H1	Fabrizio Cornegliani; Italy	34:50.45	Maxime Hordies; Belgium	35:11.13	Nicolas Pieter du Preez; South Africa	36:07.05
Time trial	H2	Sergio Garrote Muñoz; Spain	24:33.71	Luca Mazzone; Italy	25:18.83	Florian Jouanny; France	25:19.29
Time trial	H3	Mathieu Bosredon; France	43:33.22	Johan Quaile; France	45:33.41	Martino Pini; Italy	46:13.69
Time trial	H4	Jetze Plat; Netherlands	41:28.51	Thomas Frühwirth; Austria	41:31.22	Jonas Van de Steene; Belgium	41:31.22
Time trial	H5	Mitch Valize; Netherlands	41:01.59	Loïc Vergnaud; France	43:20.40	Luis Costa; Portugal	44:26.32
Time trial	C1	Ricardo Ten Argilés; Spain	20:39.53	Michael Teuber; Germany	21:18.14	Zbigniew Maciejewski; Poland	21:18.94
Time trial	C2	Alexandre Léauté; France	19:24.45	Ewoud Vromant; Belgium	19:26.61	Darren Hicks; Australia	19:40.08
Time trial	C3	Thomas Peyroton-Dartet; France	38:28.80	Eduardo Santas Asensio; Spain	39:12.71	Matthias Schindler; Germany	39:21.35
Time trial	C4	Kévin Le Cunff; France	36:46.49	Gatien Le Rousseau; France	37:18.38	Damián Ramos Sánchez; Spain	38:05.94
Time trial	C5	Daniel Abraham Gebru; Netherlands	35:51.79	Alistair Donohoe; Australia	36:18.66	Dorian Foulon; France	36:49.84
Time trial	T1–2	Chen Jianxin; China	21:35.78	Nathan Clement; Canada	22:53.36	Tim Celen; Belgium	23:27.64

==== Women's events ====
Event	Class	Gold		Silver		Bronze	
Road race	B	Great Britain; Sophie Unwin; Pilot: Jenny Holl	2:37:26	Ireland; Katie-George Dunlevy; Pilot: Linda Kelly	2:37:29	Great Britain; Lora Fachie; Pilot: Corrine Hall	2:39:01
Road race	H1–4	Lauren Parker; Australia	52:04	Jennette Jansen; Netherlands	56:15	Annika Zeyen-Giles; Germany	56:15
Road race	H5	Oksana Masters; United States	1:52:14	Sun Bianbian; China	1:52:25	Ana Maria Vitelaru; Italy	1:52:27
Road race	C1–3	Keiko Sugiura; Japan	1:38:48	Flurina Rigling; Switzerland	1:38:48	Clara Brown; United States	1:38:48
Road race	C4–5	Sarah Storey; Great Britain	1:54:24	Heïdi Gaugain; France	1:54:24	Paula Ossa; Colombia	1:54:44
Road race	T1–2	Emma Lund; Denmark	1:00:16	Celine van Till; Switzerland	1:00:16	Marieke van Soest; Netherlands	1:00:16
Time trial	B	Ireland; Katie-George Dunlevy; Pilot: Linda Kelly	38:16.58	Great Britain; Sophie Unwin; Pilot: Jenny Holl	39:40.18	Great Britain; Lora Fachie; Pilot: Corrine Hall	40:41.30
Time trial	H1–3	Katerina Brim; United States	24:14.59	Lauren Parker; Australia	24:24.09	Annika Zeyen-Giles; Germany	25:30.84
Time trial	H4–5	Oksana Masters; United States	23:45.20	Chantal Haenen; Netherlands	23:51.44	Sun Bianbian; China	25:13.07
Time trial	C1–3	Maike Hausberger; Germany	21:30.45	Frances Brown; Great Britain	21:46.18	Anna Beck; Sweden	21:54.71
Time trial	C4	Samantha Bosco; United States	21:39.24	Meg Lemon; Australia	21:44.16	Franziska Matile-Dörig; Switzerland	21:44.33
Time trial	C5	Sarah Storey; Great Britain	20:22.15	Heïdi Gaugain; France	20:26.84	Alana Forster; Australia	21:00.48
Time trial	T1–2	Marieke van Soest; Netherlands	25:47.78	Celine van Till; Switzerland	27:58.13	Emma Lund; Denmark	28:52.13

==== Mixed event ====
Event	Class	Gold		Silver		Bronze	
Team relay	H1–5	France; Mathieu Bosredon; Florian Jouanny; Joseph Fritsch	24:12	Italy; Federico Mestroni; Luca Mazzone; Mirko Testa	25:16	United States; Travis Gaertner; Katerina Brim; Matt Tingley	25:50

=== Track ===
==== Men's events ====
Event	Class	Gold		Silver		Bronze	
Time trial	B	Great Britain; James Ball; Pilot: Steffan Lloyd	58.964	Great Britain; Neil Fachie; Pilot: Matt Rotherham	59.312	Germany; Thomas Ulbricht; Pilot: Robert Förstemann	59.862
Time trial	C1–3	Li Zhangyu; China	1:03.480	Liang Weicong; China	1:04.103	Alexandre Léauté; France	1:04.207
Time trial	C4–5	Korey Boddington; Australia	1:01.650	Blaine Hunt; Great Britain	1:01.776	Alfonso Cabello; Spain	1:01.969
Pursuit	B	Netherlands; Tristan Bangma; Pilot: Patrick Bos	3:55.439	Great Britain; Stephen Bate; Pilot: Chris Latham	3:57.652	Italy; Lorenzo Bernard; Pilot: Davide Plebani	4:04.613
Pursuit	C1	Li Zhangyu; China	—	Liang Weicong; China	— OVL	Ricardo Ten Argilés; Spain	3:45.152
Pursuit	C2	Alexandre Léauté; France	3:26.015	Ewoud Vromant; Belgium	3:28.062	Matthew Robertson; Great Britain	3:30.497
Pursuit	C3	Jaco van Gass; Great Britain	3:18.460	Finlay Graham; Great Britain	3:22.540	Alexandre Hayward; Canada	3:24.865
Pursuit	C4	Jozef Metelka; Slovakia	4:27.920	Archie Atkinson; Great Britain	— OVL	Gatien Le Rousseau; France	4:24.096
Pursuit	C5	Dorian Foulon; France	4:16.158	Yehor Dementyev; Ukraine	4:17.770	Elouan Gardon; United States	4:18.880

==== Women's events ====
Event	Class	Gold		Silver		Bronze	
Time trial	B	Great Britain; Elizabeth Jordan; Pilot: Dannielle Khan	1:06.976	Australia; Jessica Gallagher; Pilot: Caitlin Ward	1:07.533	Great Britain; Sophie Unwin; Pilot: Jenny Holl	1:07.879
Time trial	C1–3	Amanda Reid; Australia	36.676	Qian Wangwei; China	37.616	Maike Hausberger; Germany	38.358
Time trial	C4–5	Caroline Groot; Netherlands	35.566	Marie Patouillet; France	36.700	Kate O'Brien; Canada	36.873
Pursuit	B	Great Britain; Sophie Unwin; Pilot: Jenny Holl	3:19.149	Ireland; Katie-George Dunlevy; Pilot: Eve McCrystal	3:21.315	Great Britain; Lora Fachie; Pilot: Corrine Hall	3:20.488
Pursuit	C1–3	Wang Xiaomei; China	3:41.692	Daphne Schrager; Great Britain	3:51.129	Flurina Rigling; Switzerland	3:48.512
Pursuit	C4	Emily Petricola; Australia	—	Anna Taylor; New Zealand	— OVL	Keely Shaw; Canada	3:46.942
Pursuit	C5	Marie Patouillet; France	3:35.691	Heïdi Gaugain; France	3:37.723	Nicole Murray; New Zealand	3:36.206

==== Mixed event ====
Event	Class	Gold		Silver		Bronze	
Team sprint	C1–5	Great Britain; Kadeena Cox; Jaco van Gass; Jody Cundy	47.738	Spain; Ricardo Ten Argilés; Pablo Jaramillo Gallardo; Alfonso Cabello	49.564	Australia; Gordon Allan; Alistair Donohoe; Korey Boddington	49.036

== See also ==
- Cycling at the 2024 Summer Olympics
