= Fabian Recher =

Swiss para-cyclist

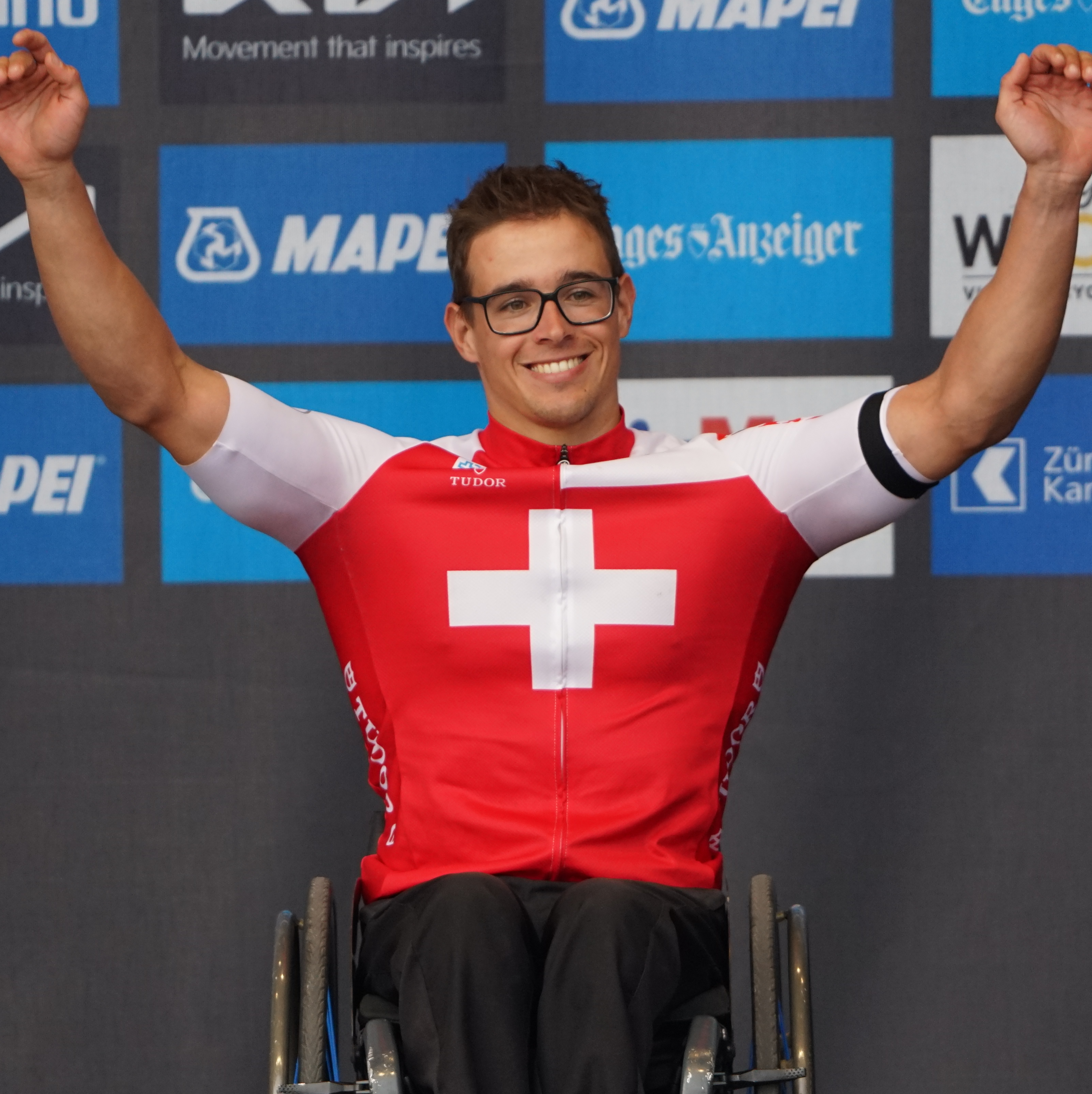
- Recher at the 2024 Road World Championships

Personal information
- Nationality: Swiss
- Born: 3 May 1999 (age 27) Spiez, Switzerland

Sport
- Sport: Para-cycling
- Disability class: H4
Medal record
Representing Switzerland
Men's para-cycling
Road World Championships
Silver medal – second place	2024 Zurich	Time trial H4
Silver medal – second place	2025 Ronse	Time trial H4
Silver medal – second place	2025 Ronse	Road race H4
Bronze medal – third place	2021 Cascais	Road race H4
Bronze medal – third place	2024 Zurich	Road race H4

Fabian Recher (born 3 May 1999) is a Swiss Para-cyclist. He represented Switzerland at the 2020 and 2024 Summer Paralympics.

== Career ==
In June 2021, Recher represented Switzerland at the 2021 UCI Para-cycling Road World Championships and won a bronze medal in the road race H4 event. In September 2021, he represented Switzerland at the 2020 Summer Paralympics and finished in seventh place in the road race H4 event.

In September 2024, Recher represented Switzerland at the 2024 Summer Paralympics and finished in sixth place in the time trial H4 event. The next day he finished in fifth place in the road race H4 event. He was in the leading group during the road race, however, he crashed into the bumper of Jonas Van de Steene's handcycle during a bend, ending his chance at a medal. Weeks later, he then competed at the 2024 UCI Para-cycling Road World Championships and won a silver medal in the time trial H4 event.

== Personal life ==
Recher was born to Judith and Martin Recher. He was born with spina bifida and was the first European baby to be operated on in the womb before he was born to treat the condition.
