= Cycling at the 2024 Summer Paralympics – Women's road time trial H1–3 =

Women's road time trial H1–3 at the XVII Paralympic Games
- Venue: Clichy-sous-Bois
- Dates: 4 September
- Competitors: 10 from 8 nations
- Winning time: 24:14.59

Medalists
1st place, gold medalist(s)		Katerina Brim	United States
2nd place, silver medalist(s)		Lauren Parker	Australia
3rd place, bronze medalist(s)		Annika Zeyen-Giles	Germany

The Women's time trial H1–3 road cycling event at the 2024 Summer Paralympics took place on 4 September 2024, at Clichy-sous-Bois, Paris. Ten riders competed in the event.

The H1-3 classifications are for hand cyclists with the greatest level of impairment. As this is a composite classification event, times are factored.

== Results ==
Rank	Rider	Nationality	Class	r.t.	Factor	Result	n.d.	Notes
1st place, gold medalist(s)	Katerina Brim	United States	H2	28:08.83	86.13%	24:14.59		
2nd place, silver medalist(s)	Lauren Parker	Australia	H3	24:24.09	100%	24:24.09	+00:09.50	
3rd place, bronze medalist(s)	Annika Zeyen-Giles	Germany	H3	25:30.84	100%	25:30.84	+01:16.25	
4	Jady Malavazzi	Brazil	H3	26:34.29	100%	26:34.29	+02:19.70	
5	Anaïs Vincent	France	H3	26:59.15	100%	26:59.15	+02:44.56	
6	Francesca Porcellato	Italy	H3	27:13.50	100%	27:13.50	+02:58.91	
7	Katerina Antosova	Czech Republic	H3	31:01.83	100%	31:01.83	+06:47.24	
8	Mariana Garcia	Brazil	H3	31:30.42	100%	31:30.42	+07:15.83	
9	Darin Sheepchondan	Thailand	H1	57:22.64	62.65%	35:56.81	+11:42.22	
10	Naphatsakorn Rodklang	Thailand	H3	40:05.80	100%	40:05.80	+15:51.21	
