= Wheelchair basketball at the 2024 Summer Paralympics =

Wheelchair basketball at the XVII Paralympic Games
- Paralympic Wheelchair Basketball
- Venue: Bercy Arena
- Dates: 29 August – 8 September 2024
- Competitors: 192 (8 men's and women's teams) from 10 nations

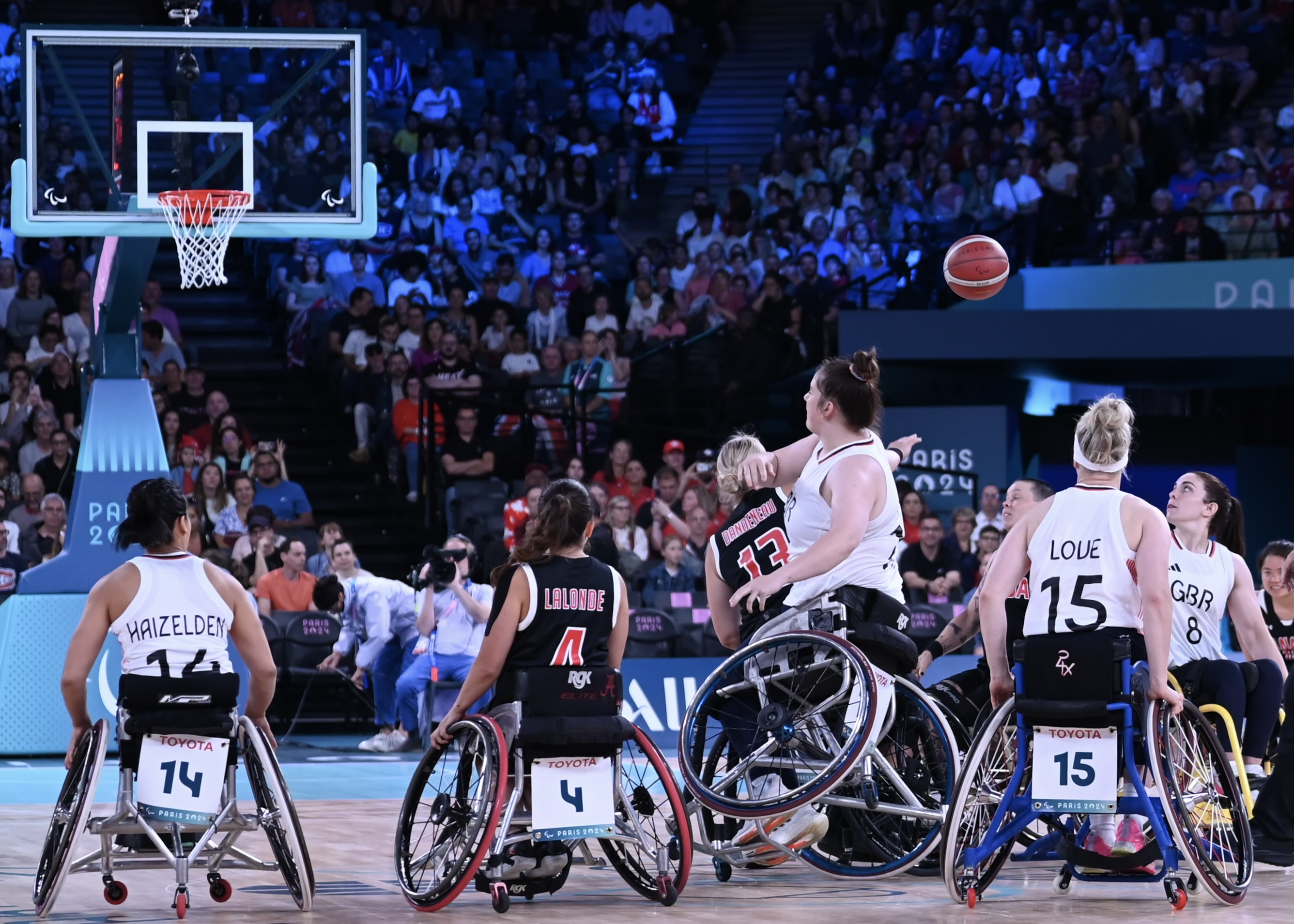
Great Britain vs Canada

Wheelchair basketball at the 2024 Summer Paralympics in Paris, France was hosted between 29 August to 8 September 2024. It featured men's and women's tournaments. There was a reduced number of teams participating; eight teams in each tournament, four fewer men's teams and two fewer women's teams than in the previous Games.

== Qualification ==
The top four nations earn sports for their Zones, the winners of the zonal championships will qualify for the Paralympics. Teams are invited to the repechage tournament if the team hasn't earned a quota based on their zonal place rankings via the World Championships. The host nation and the repechage host are also invited to this tournament if they haven't already qualified.

=== Men ===
Means of qualification	Date	Venue	Berths	Qualified
2023 European Para Championships	8–20 August 2023	(Netherlands) Rotterdam	2	Great Britain; Spain
2023 Parapan American Games	17–26 November 2023	(Chile) Santiago	1	United States
2024 IWBF Asia-Oceania Championships	12–20 January 2024	(Thailand) Bangkok	1	Australia
2024 IWBF Men's Repechage	12–15 April 2024	(France) Antibes	4	Canada; France; Germany; Netherlands
Total			8	

=== Women ===
Means of qualification	Date	Venue	Berths	Qualified
2023 European Para Championships	8–20 August 2023	(Netherlands) Rotterdam	2	Great Britain; Netherlands
2023 Parapan American Games	17–26 November 2023	(Chile) Santiago	1	United States
2024 IWBF Asia-Oceania Championships	12–20 January 2024	(Thailand) Bangkok	1	China
2024 IWBF Women's Repechage	17–20 April 2024	(Japan) Osaka	4	Germany; Japan; Spain; Canada
Total			8	

== Medalists ==
Event	Gold	Silver	Bronze
Men	United States	Great Britain	Germany
Women	Netherlands	United States	China

== See also ==
- Basketball at the 2024 Summer Olympics
