= Ali Truwit =

American paralympic swimmer (born 2000)

Personal information
- Full name: Alexandra Truwit
- Born: May 31, 2000 (age 26) Darien, Connecticut, U.S.
- Education: Yale University

Sport
- Sport: Paralympic swimming
- Disability class: S10
Medal record
Women's para swimming
Representing the United States
Paralympic Games
Silver medal – second place	2024 Paris	400 m freestyle S10
Silver medal – second place	2024 Paris	100 m backstroke S10

Alexandra Truwit (born May 31, 2000) is an American Paralympic swimmer. She represented the United States at the 2024 Summer Paralympics.

== Early life and education ==
Truwit attended St. Luke's School in New Canaan, Connecticut. Her high school did not have a swim team, so she swam for the Chelsea Piers Swim team.

She attended Yale University and was a member of the Yale Bulldogs swimming and diving team. She graduated from Yale with a Bachelor of Science degree in cognitive science and behavioral economics.

== Career ==
During the 2024 United States Paralympic trials, Truwit set an American record in the 100 m backstroke S10 event with a time of 1:08.98. On June 30, 2024, she was named to team USA's roster to compete at the 2024 Summer Paralympics. She won two Paralympic silver medals: in the women’s S10 400-meter freestyle and 100m backstroke.

In May 2025, Truwit was featured in the Sports Illustrated Swimsuit Issue.

== Personal life ==
Truwit's mother, Jody, was captain of Yale's women's swimming and diving team in 1991. In May 2023, two days after graduating from Yale University, Truwit was on a vacation in the Turks and Caicos Islands, with her friend Sophie Pilkinton. While snorkeling in the Caribbean Sea, she was the victim of a shark attack, biting her foot off at the ankle, and part of her leg. She then had to swim 50 to 75 yards to get back to their boat for safety. After returning to the boat, Pilkinton stopped the bleeding on Truwit's leg by applying a tourniquet, helping to save her life. She was then airlifted to a Miami hospital and underwent two life-saving surgeries to help fight infections. On her birthday, May 31, her leg was amputated below her knee to allow for better mobility with a prosthetic.
