= Talen Jourdan =

American wheelchair basketball player

Personal information
- Full name: Talen Ray Jourdan
- Born: October 25, 1999 (age 26) Deerfield, Wisconsin, U.S.
- Education: University of Wisconsin–Whitewater

Sport
- Sport: Wheelchair basketball
- Disability class: 1.0
Medal record
Representing the United States
Men's wheelchair basketball
Paralympic Games
Gold medal – first place	2024 Paris	Team
World Championship
Gold medal – first place	2022 Dubai	Team
Parapan American Games
Gold medal – first place	2023 Santiago	Team

Talen Ray Jourdan (born October 25, 1999) is an American wheelchair basketball player and a member of the United States men's national wheelchair basketball team. He will represent the United States at the 2024 Summer Paralympics.

== Early life and education ==
Jourdan attended University of Wisconsin–Whitewater where he was a member of the wheelchair basketball team. He helped lead the Warhawk's to the 2024 National Wheelchair Basketball Association men's college national championship.

== Career ==
Jourdan represented the United States 2022 Wheelchair Basketball World Championships and won a gold medal. At 23 years old, he was the youngest player on the team.

In November 2023, he represented the United States at the 2023 Parapan American Games and won a gold medal in wheelchair basketball. As a result, Team USA automatically qualified to compete at the 2024 Summer Paralympics.

On March 30, 2024, he was selected to represent the United States at the 2024 Summer Paralympics. Won Gold at the 2024 Paralympic Games in Paris.

He played college wheelchair basketball for UW-Whitewater and was a one-time second team All American and a two-time First Team All American wheelchair basketball player. He won the NWBA Inter-Collegiate National Championship in 2024.

== Personal life ==
At 13 years old, during the opening morning of deer hunting season, Jourdan was in a tree stand while hunting when he experienced a bout of dizziness and fell to the ground. He broke his collar bone, suffered from a collapsed lung, and broken ribs, fractured vertebrae in his neck and suffered a broken T6/T7 vertebrae in his back. Due to his injuries, he became paralyzed from the chest down.

He graduated from Deerfield Wisconsin High School.
