= Cycling at the 2024 Summer Paralympics – Men's pursuit C5 =

Men's individual pursuit C5 at the XVII Paralympic Games
- Venue: Vélodrome National
- Dates: 31 August 2024
- Competitors: 14 from 12 nations
- Winning time: 4:16.158

Medalists
1st place, gold medalist(s)		Dorian Foulon	France
2nd place, silver medalist(s)		Yehor Dementyev	Ukraine
3rd place, bronze medalist(s)		Elouan Gardon	United States

The men's individual pursuit class C5 track cycling event at the 2024 Summer Paralympics took place on 31 August 2024 at the Vélodrome National.

== Competition format ==
The C category is for cyclists with a physical impairment (muscle power or range of motion, and impairments affecting the coordination) that prevents them from competing in able-bodied competition but still competes using a standard bicycle.

The competition starts with a qualifying round where it comprises a head-to-head race between the 14 cyclists. The 2 fastest cyclists in the qualifying would qualify to the gold medal final while the 3rd and 4th fastest will qualify to the bronze medal final where they will race head-to-head. The distance of this event is 4000 metres. The medal finals are also held on the same day as the qualifying.

== Schedule ==
All times are Central European Summer Time (UTC+2)

Date	Time	Round
31 August	11:58	Qualifying
31 August	15:10	Finals

== Results ==
=== Qualifying ===
Rank	Heat	Cyclist	Nation	Result	Notes
1	7	Dorian Foulon	France	4:13.934	QG, WR
2	6	Yehor Dementyev	Ukraine	4:17.456	QG
3	6	Elouan Gardon	United States	4:18.817	QB
4	5	Franz-Josef Lässer	Austria	4:21.084	QB
5	7	Lauro Chaman	Brazil	4:21.768	
6	3	Martin van de Pol	Netherlands	4:22.506	
7	4	Blaine Hunt	Great Britain	4:23.961	
8	5	Daniel Abraham	Netherlands	4:24.280	
9	4	Zsombor Wermeser	Hungary	4:27.008	
10	3	Carlos Vargas	Colombia	4:33.077	
11	2	Edwin Fabián Mátiz Ruiz	Colombia	4:38.993	
12	1	Azimbek Abdullaev	Uzbekistan	4:43.555	
13	2	Hernán Moya	Chile	4:50.769	
14	1	Ahmed Al-Bedwawi	United Arab Emirates	4:56.305	

=== Finals ===
Rank	Cyclist	Nation	Result	Notes
Gold medal final
1st place, gold medalist(s)	Dorian Foulon	France	4:16.158	
2nd place, silver medalist(s)	Yehor Dementyev	Ukraine	4:17.770	
Bronze medal final
3rd place, bronze medalist(s)	Elouan Gardon	United States	4:18.880	
4	Franz-Josef Lässer	Austria	4:25.009	
