= Jeromie Meyer =

American wheelchair basketball player

Personal information
- Full name: Jeromie Alex Meyer II
- Born: April 11, 1997 (age 29) Woodbine, Iowa, U.S.
- Education: University of Nebraska Omaha; University of Wisconsin–Whitewater

Sport
- Sport: Wheelchair basketball
- Disability class: 2.0
Medal record
Representing the United States
Men's wheelchair basketball
Paralympic Games
Gold medal – first place	2024 Paris	Team
World Championship
Gold medal – first place	2022 Dubai	Team
Parapan American Games
Gold medal – first place	2023 Santiago	Team

Jeromie Alex Meyer II (born April 11, 1997) is an American wheelchair basketball player and a member of the United States men's national wheelchair basketball team. He represented the United States at the 2024 Summer Paralympics.

== Early life and education ==
Meyer attended Woodbine High School in Woodbine, Iowa. He then played wheelchair basketball at University of Nebraska Omaha, where he was a founding member of the Nebraska Red Dawgs.

== Career ==
Meyer represented the United States 2022 Wheelchair Basketball World Championships and won a gold medal.

In November 2023, he represented the United States at the 2023 Parapan American Games and won a gold medal in wheelchair basketball. As a result, Team USA automatically qualified to compete at the 2024 Summer Paralympics. On March 30, 2024, he was selected to represent the United States at the 2024 Summer Paralympics. He won a gold medal in wheelchair basketball.

== Personal life ==
Meyer was struck by a drunk driver while riding his bicycle at nine years old. He broke every bone in his right leg, suffered a fractured skull and lacerations on both of his knees from the handlebars, and a T-10 spinal contusion, which left him paralyzed from the hips down.
