= Austria at the 2024 Summer Paralympics =

- Flag of Austria
- IPC code: AUT
- NPC: Austrian Paralympic Committee
- Website: www.oepc.at (in German)

in Paris, France 28 August 2024 – 8 September 2024
- Competitors: 24 (17 men and 7 women) in 11 sports
- Flag bearers: Henriett Koósz; Pepo Puch
- Medals Ranked 69th: Gold 0 Silver 3 Bronze 1 Total 4

Summer Paralympics appearances (overview)
- 1960; 1964; 1968; 1972; 1976; 1980; 1984; 1988; 1992; 1996; 2000; 2004; 2008; 2012; 2016; 2020; 2024

Austria competed at the 2024 Summer Paralympics in Paris, France, from 28 August to 8 September.

== Medalists ==
The following Austrian competitors won medals at the games. In the discipline sections below, the medalists' names are bolded.

Medal	Name	Sport	Event	Date
Silver	Florian Brungraber	Paratriathlon	Men's PTWC	2 September
Silver	Thomas Frühwirth	Cycling	Men's time trial H4	4 September
Silver	Thomas Frühwirth	Cycling	Men's H4 Road Race	5 September
Bronze	Natalija Eder	Athletics	Women's javelin throw F13	31 August

Medals by sport
Sport	1st place, gold medalist(s)	2nd place, silver medalist(s)	3rd place, bronze medalist(s)	Total
Athletics	0	0	1	**1**
Paratriathlon	0	1	0	**1**
Cycling	0	2	0	**2**
Total	0	3	1	4

Medals by day
Day	Date	1st place, gold medalist(s)	2nd place, silver medalist(s)	3rd place, bronze medalist(s)	Total
1	29 August	0	0	0	**0**
2	30 August	0	0	0	**0**
3	31 August	0	0	1	**1**
4	1 September	0	0	0	**0**
5	2 September	0	1	0	**1**
6	3 September	0	0	0	**0**
7	4 September	0	1	0	**1**
8	5 September	0	1	0	**1**
9	6 September	0	0	0	**0**
10	7 September	0	0	0	**0**
11	8 September	0	0	0	**0**
Total		0	3	1	4

Medals by gender
Gender	1st place, gold medalist(s)	2nd place, silver medalist(s)	3rd place, bronze medalist(s)	Total	Percentage
Female	0	0	1	**1**	25%
Male	0	3	0	**3**	75%
Total	0	3	1	4	100%

=== Multiple Medallists ===
Multiple medallists
**Name**	**Sport**	1st place, gold medalist(s)	2nd place, silver medalist(s)	3rd place, bronze medalist(s)	**Total**
Thomas Frühwirth	Cycling	0	2	0	**2**

== Competitors ==
The following is the list of number of competitors in the Games.

Sport	Men	Women	Total
Archery	1	0	1
Athletics	2	1	3
Badminton	0	1	1
Cycling	4	2	6
Equestrian	2	1	3
Paracanoeing	1	0	1
Paratriathlon	1	0	1
Shooting	1	0	1
Swimming	2	1	3
Table tennis	1	0	1
Wheelchair tennis	2	0	2
Total	17	6	23

== Archery ==
For the first time in Paralympics Games, Austria secured a quota place in the men's compound, event by virtue of the nations result at the 2024 World Qualification Tournament in Dubai, United Arab Emirates.

Athlete	Event	Ranking Round		Round of 32	Round of 16	Quarterfinals	Semifinals	Finals	
Athlete	Event	Score	Seed	Opposition Score	Opposition Score	Opposition Score	Opposition Score	Opposition Score	Rank
Michael Meier	Men's individual compound	691	13	Charao (BRA); W 142–135	Tremblay (CAN); L 139–140	Did not advance			

== Athletics ==
Austrian track and field athletes achieved quota places for the following events based on their results at the 2023 World Championships, 2024 World Championships, or through high performance allocation, as long as they meet the minimum entry standard (MES).

Key

- Note–Ranks given for track events are within the athlete's heat only
- Q = Qualified for the next round
- q = Qualified for the next round as a fastest loser or, in field events, by position without achieving the qualifying target
- DQ = Disqualified
- PR = Paralympic Record
- AR = Area (or continental) Record
- NR = National Record
- SB = Season's Best
- N/A = Round not applicable for the event
- Bye = Athlete not required to compete in round

Field events

Athlete	Event	Final	
Athlete	Event	Distance	Position
Georg Schober	Men's shot put F63	12.56	8
Bil Marinkovic	Men's discus throw F11	38.14	6
Natalija Eder	Women's javelin throw F13	37.22	3rd place, bronze medalist(s)

== Badminton ==
Austria has qualified one para badminton player for the following events, through the release of BWF para-badminton Race to Paris Paralympic Ranking.

Athlete	Event	Group Stage				Quarterfinal	Semifinal	Final / BM	
Athlete	Event	Opposition Score	Opposition Score	Opposition Score	Rank	Opposition Score	Opposition Score	Opposition Score	Rank
Henriett Koósz	Women's singles WH1	To (BEL); L 0–2	Kwon (KOR); L 0–2	—N/a	3	Did not advance			

== Cycling ==
Austria entered two para-cyclists (one in each gender) after finished the top eligible nation's at the 2022 UCI Nation's ranking allocation ranking.

=== Road ===
Men

Athlete	Event	Time	Rank
Thomas Frühwirth	Men's road race H4	1:29:46	2nd place, silver medalist(s)
Thomas Frühwirth	Men's time trial H4	41:31.22	2nd place, silver medalist(s)
Alexander Gritsch	Men's road race H4	1:42:38	6
Alexander Gritsch	Men's time trial H4	45:11.96	8
Franz-Josef Lässer	Men's road race C4-5	2:32:35	13
Franz-Josef Lässer	Men's time trial C5	37:16.60	5
Wolfgang Steinbichler	Men's road race T1-2	1:17:15	5
Wolfgang Steinbichler	Men's time trial T1-2	24:59.86	6

Women

Athlete	Event	Time	Rank
Svetlana Moshkovich	Women's road race H1-2-3-4	56:57	7
Svetlana Moshkovich	Women's time trial H4-5	27:15.05	8
Cornelia Wibmer	Women's road race H1-2-3-4	1:00:12	11
Cornelia Wibmer	Women's time trial H4-5	34:31.97	13

=== Track ===
Men

Athlete	Event	Qualification		Final	
Athlete	Event	Time	Rank	Time	Rank
Franz-Josef Lässer	Men's 1000 m C4-5	1:06.463	12	Did not advance	
Franz-Josef Lässer	Men's pursuit C5	4:21.084	4 QB	Final bronze medal Gordon (USA); L4:25.009-4:18.880	4

== Equestrian ==
Austria entered a full squad of four para-equestrians into the Paralympic equestrian competition, as one of the top two teams, not yet qualified, through final world para dressage rankings.

Individual

Athlete	Horse	Event	Total	
Athlete	Horse	Event	Score	Rank
Pepo Puch	Sailor's Blue	Individual championship test grade II	72.793	5
Pepo Puch	Sailor's Blue	Individual freestyle test grade II	74.127	5
Julia Sciancalepore	Heinrich IV	Individual championship test grade I	68.917	10
Julia Sciancalepore	Heinrich IV	Individual freestyle test grade I	Did not advance	
Thomas Haller	Espalion	Individual championship test grade III	63.733	11
Thomas Haller	Espalion	Individual freestyle test grade III	Did not advance	

Team

Athlete	Horse	Event	Individual score	Total	
Athlete	Horse	Event	TT	Score	Rank
Pepo Puch	See above	Team	74.100	209.125	9
Julia Sciancalepore	See above	Team	71.458	209.125	9
Thomas Haller	See above	Team	63.567	209.125	9

== Paracanoeing ==
Austria earned quota places for the following events through the 2023 ICF Canoe Sprint World Championships in Duisburg, Germany.

Athlete	Event	Heats		Semifinal		Final	
Athlete	Event	Time	Rank	Time	Rank	Time	Rank
Markus Swoboda	Men's KL2	43.87	2 SF	43.41	1 FA	42.63	4
Markus Swoboda	Men's VL3	53.49	6 SF	50.79	2 FA		

== Paratriathlon ==
Austria have qualified one quota for the paratriathlon via world rankings.

Athlete	Event	Swim	Trans 1	Bike	Trans 2	Run	Total time	Rank
Florian Brungraber	Men's PTWC	14:15	1:14	31:49	0:51	11:16	59:25	2nd place, silver medalist(s)

== Shooting ==
Mixed

Athlete	Event	Qualification		Final	
Athlete	Event	Points	Rank	Points	Rank
Josef Pacher	R5 Mixed 10 metre air rifle prone SH2	631.8	23	Did not advance	
Josef Pacher	R9 Mixed 50 metre rifle prone SH2	615.5	20	Did not advance	

== Swimming ==
Men

Athlete	Event	Heats		Final	
Athlete	Event	Result	Rank	Result	Rank
Andreas Onea	Men's 100 m breaststroke SB8	1:13.71	12	Did not advance	
Andreas Onea	Men's 200 m individual medley SM8	2:31.29	9	Did not advance	
Andreas Ernhofer	Men's 50 m freestyle S4	42.44	10	Did not advance	
Andreas Ernhofer	Men's 200 m freestyle S4	3:30.89	12	Did not advance	
Andreas Ernhofer	Men's 50 m backstroke S4	48.35	10	Did not advance	

Women

Athlete	Event	Heats		Final	
Athlete	Event	Result	Rank	Result	Rank
Janina Falk	Women's 100 m breaststroke SB14	1:23.65	11	Did not advance	
Janina Falk	Women's 100 m butterfly S14	1:11.67	13	Did not advance	
Janina Falk	Women's 200 m individual medley SM14	2:37.70	10	Did not advance	

== Table tennis ==
Austria entered one athletes for the Paralympic games. Krisztian Gardos qualified for the games through the allocations of the final ITTF world ranking.

Athlete	Event	Round of 16	Quarterfinals	Semifinals	Final / BM	
Athlete	Event	Opposition Result	Opposition Result	Opposition Result	Opposition Result	Rank
Krisztian Gardos	Men's individual C10	Massad (BRA); L 1–3	Did not advance			

== Wheelchair tennis ==
Men

Athlete	Event	Round of 64	Round of 32	Round of 16	Quarterfinals	Semifinals	Final / BM	
Athlete	Event	Opposition Score	Opposition Score	Opposition Score	Opposition Score	Opposition Score	Opposition Score	Rank
Josef Riegler	Men's singles	Dharmasena (SRI); L 1–6, 3–6	Did not advance					
Nico Langmann	Men's singles	Hang (KOR); W 6–2, 0–6, 6–2	Scheffers (NED); L 4–6, 1–6	Did not advance				
Josef Riegler; Nico Langmann	Men's doubles	—N/a	Bye	Hang / Im (KOR); L 2–6, 0–6	Did not advance			

== See also ==
- Austria at the 2024 Summer Olympics
- Austria at the Paralympics
