= Katerina Brim =

American para-cyclist (born 1998)

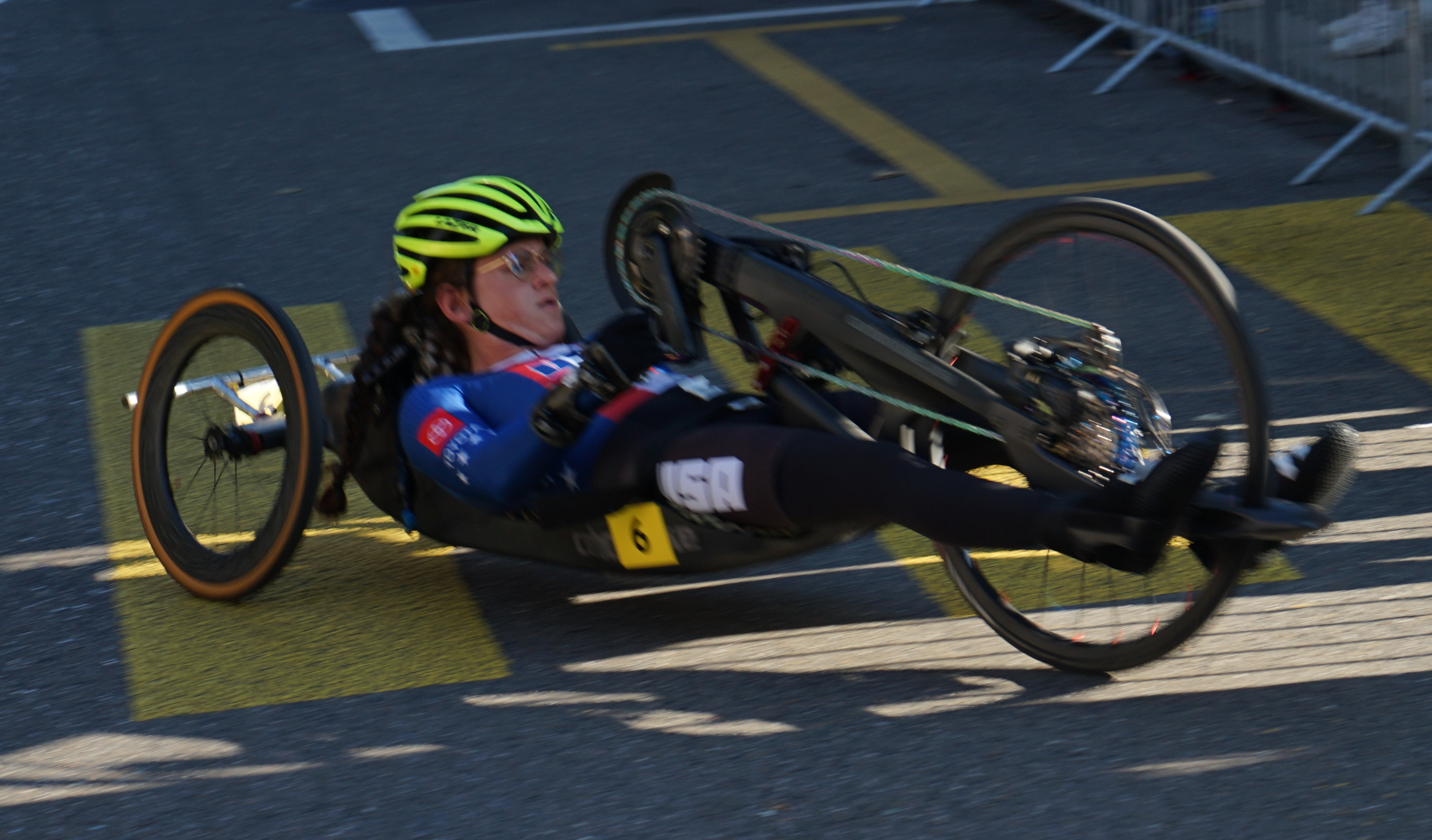
- Brim at the 2024 UCI Para-cycling Road World Championships

Personal information
- Nickname: Kate
- Nationality: American
- Born: May 31, 1998 (age 28) Ukraine
- Home town: Lowell, Michigan, U.S.

Sport
- Sport: Para-cycling
- Disability class: H2
Medal record
Women's Para-cycling
Representing the United States
Paralympic Games
Gold medal – first place	2024 Paris	Time trial H1–3
Bronze medal – third place	2024 Paris	Mixed team relay H1–5
Road World Championships
Gold medal – first place	2022 Baie-Comeau	Road race H2
Gold medal – first place	2022 Baie-Comeau	Time trial H2
Gold medal – first place	2024 Zurich	Road race H2
Gold medal – first place	2024 Zurich	Time trial H2
Parapan American Games
Gold medal – first place	2023 Santiago	Time trial H1–5
Silver medal – second place	2023 Santiago	Road race H2–5

Katerina Brim (born May 31, 1998) is an American Para-cyclist. She represented the United States at the 2024 Summer Paralympics.

== Early life and education ==
Brim was born in Ukraine and moved to the United States after being adopted in 2003. She graduated from Lowell High School in Lowell, Michigan. She then took college classes online at Southern New Hampshire University.

== Career ==
Brim made her international debut for the United States at the 2022 UCI Para-cycling Road World Championships and won gold medals in the road race H2 and time trial H2 events.

On May 23, 2023, she accepted a one-year suspension for a banned substance from the United States Anti-Doping Agency after the World Anti-Doping Agency denied her a retroactive therapeutic use exemption. She tested positive for Humalog, an insulin used to treat diabetes. She later applied for and was approved for a therapeutic use exemption. In November 2023, she represented the United States at the 2023 Parapan American Games and won a gold medal in the road time trial H1–5 and a silver medal in the road race H2–5 event.

On July 8, 2024, Brim qualified to represent the United States at the 2024 Summer Paralympics.

== Personal life ==
In 2017, Brim underwent a routine surgery for a herniated disc. A blood clot developed that traveled up her spinal canal, which led to a spinal cord injury and left her a quadriplegic. She is a type 1 diabetic.
