= Fabian Romo =

American wheelchair basketball player

Personal information
- Full name: Fabian Daniel Romo
- Born: January 22, 1997 (age 29)
- Home town: Arlington, Texas, U.S.
- Education: University of Texas at Arlington

Sport
- Sport: Wheelchair basketball
- Disability class: 4.0
Medal record
Representing the United States
Men's wheelchair basketball
Paralympic Games
| Gold medal – first place | 2024 Paris | Team |
World Championship
| Gold medal – first place | 2022 Dubai | Team |
Parapan American Games
| Gold medal – first place | 2023 Santiago | Team |

Fabian Daniel Romo (born January 22, 1997) is an American wheelchair basketball player and a member of the United States men's national wheelchair basketball team. He represented the United States at the 2024 Summer Paralympics.

== Early life and education ==
Romo was born to Arturo and Sylvia Romo. He attended Elkins High School in Missouri City, Texas. He then attended University of Texas at Arlington, where he was a member of the Movin' Mavs wheelchair basketball team. He helped lead the Movin' Mavs to a national championship in 2017, and was named a first-team All-American.

== Career ==
Romo represented the United States 2022 Wheelchair Basketball World Championships and won a gold medal.

In November 2023, he represented the United States at the 2023 Parapan American Games and won a gold medal in wheelchair basketball. As a result, Team USA automatically qualified to compete at the 2024 Summer Paralympics. On March 30, 2024, he was selected to represent the United States at the 2024 Summer Paralympics. He won a gold medal in wheelchair basketball.

== Personal life ==
Romo was born without a fully formed left leg due to a birth defect, and had it amputated above the knee at four years old.
