= Christella Garcia =

American Paralympic judoka

Personal information
- Full name: Christella Josette Garcia
- Born: November 21, 1978 (age 47)
- Home town: Sacramento, California, U.S.
- Occupation: Judoka
- Height: 5 ft 7 in (170 cm)

Sport
- Country: United States
- Sport: Para judo
- Disability class: B1
Medal record
Women's judo
Representing United States
Paralympic Games
Bronze medal – third place	2016 Rio de Janeiro	70 kg
Bronze medal – third place	2024 Paris	+70 kg
Parapan American Games
Bronze medal – third place	2019 Lima	70kg

Profile at external databases
- JudoInside.com: 99696

Christella Josette Garcia (born November 21, 1978) is an American Paralympic judoka who competed in two Paralympics, in 2012 and 2016. She won the bronze metal in Rio, Brazil, in 2016 in the 70 kg weight class.
