= Elouan Gardon =

American cyclist (born 2006)

Personal information
- Born: May 6, 2006 (age 20)

Cycling career
- Sport: Cycling
- Current team: Fount Cycling
- Disciplines: Road; Track
Medal record
Representing the United States
Paralympic Games
Bronze medal – third place	2024 Paris	Individual pursuit C5
Road World Championships
Silver medal – second place	2024 Zurich	Road race C5

Elouan Gardon (born May 6, 2006) is an American cyclist. He competed at the 2024 Summer Paralympics and won a bronze medal in the men's pursuit C5 event.
