= Matt Tingley =

American para-cyclist (born 1988)

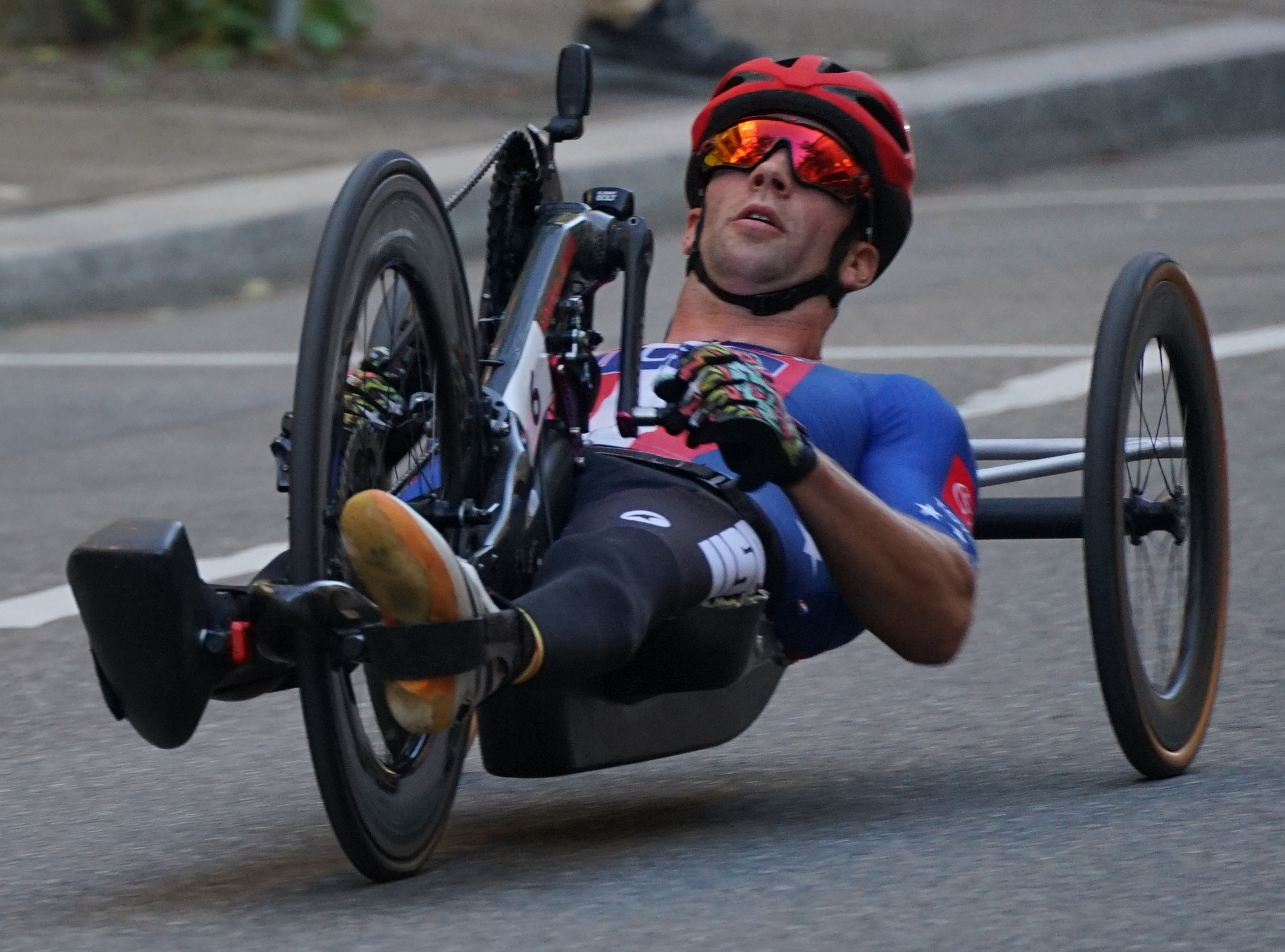
- Tingley at the 2024 Road World Championships

Personal information
- Nationality: American
- Born: June 15, 1988 (age 38) Ukraine
- Home town: Rochester, Michigan, U.S.

Sport
- Sport: Para-cycling
- Disability class: H4
Medal record
Men's Para-cycling
Representing the United States
Paralympic Games
Bronze medal – third place	2024 Paris	Mixed team relay H1–5

Matt Tingley (born June 15, 1988) is an American Para-cyclist. He represented the United States at the 2024 Summer Paralympics.

== Career ==
On July 11, 2024, Tingley was selected to represent the United States at the 2024 Summer Paralympics. He competed in the mixed team relay H1–5 event and won a bronze medal.
