= Travis Gaertner =

Canadian-American actuary (born 1980)

Personal information
- Nationality: Canada United States
- Born: January 16, 1980 (age 46) Kitchener, Ontario, Canada
- Education: 2003, University of Illinois at Urbana–Champaign
- Website: gaertnergold.com
Medal record
Paralympic Games
Representing Canada
Wheelchair basketball
Gold medal – first place	2000 Sydney	Team
Gold medal – first place	2004 Athens	Team
Representing the United States
Para-cycling
Bronze medal – third place	2024 Paris	Mixed team relay H1–5

Travis Gaertner (born January 16, 1980) is a Canadian-American actuary. He previously competed with Team Canada in the Paralympic Games in wheelchair basketball, where he won a gold medal at the 2000 Summer Paralympics and the 2004 Summer Paralympics.

== Early life and education ==
Gaertner was born on January 16, 1980, in Kitchener, Ontario, Canada to parents Diana and Jonathan. He was born with a congenital disease causing him to be born without a left and half a right leg. Until he was in fifth grade, Gaertner used a prosthetic leg but eventually switched to a wheelchair for better mobility. When Gaertner was twelve years old, Jonathan died of cancer and he decided to take up wheelchair basketball. By Grade 6, he qualified for the Manitoba Ramblers of the Manitoba Wheelchair Sports Association, and later joined the Manitoba senior wheelchair team. His play caught the attention of a Canadian coach who invited him to try out for the Canadian Paralympic team.

== Career ==
Gaertner joined Team Canada in 1998 and was selected to play for Canada at the 2000 Summer Paralympics. After returning to the University of Illinois at Urbana–Champaign with a gold medal, he helped the Manitoba Rolling Thunder win their first Canadian Wheelchair Basketball League championship title. In 2002, he was one of four students who received the Wooddy Scholarship Award as someone who earned both academic and athletic acclaim.

Later, he helped the Winnipeg Thunder win their third consecutive Canadian Wheelchair Basketball League championship title. In 2004, Gaertner was named to Team Canada to compete at the 2004 Summer Paralympics where he won gold.

Gaertner earned his American citizenship in 2012 and qualified to compete with Team USA. In May 2017, Gaertner began practicing handcycling under the coaching of Will Groulx and Tom Davis. In 2018, he was named to the U.S. Paralympics Cycling Team for the 2018 UCI Road World Championships.
