= Jørn =

Jørn is a Danish and Norwegian masculine given name. A mainly German variant of the name is Jörn. Outside the Scandinavian or German-speaking areas, the variant Jorn may occasionally occur. Notable people with the name include:

== Given name Jørn ==
- Jørn Andersen (born 1963), Norwegian professional footballer
- Jørn Christensen (born 1959), Norwegian artist, actor, and record producer
- Jørn Didriksen (born 1953), speed skater from Norway
- Jørn Eggum (born 1972), Norwegian trade unionist
- Jørn Goldstein (born 1953), Norwegian Olympic ice hockey goalie
- Jørn Lier Horst (born 1970), Norwegian author of crime fiction and a police officer
- Jørn Hurum (born 1967), Norwegian paleontologist and popularizer of science
- Jørn Jamtfall (born 1966), Norwegian football player and coach
- Jørn Jensen, one of the earliest Danish programmers
- Jørn Jeppesen (1919–1964), Danish stage and film actor
- Jørn Krab (born 1945), Danish rower who competed in the 1968 Summer Olympics
- Jørn Lande (born 1968), Norwegian heavy metal and hard rock singer, aka Jorn
- Jørn Magdahl (born 1950), Norwegian politician
- Jørn Nissen (born 1949), Danish politician
- Jørn Nielsen (born 1960), Danish mobster and high-ranking Hells Angels member
- Jørn Rattsø (born 1952), Norwegian professor of economics at the Norwegian University of Science and Technology
- Jørn Skaarup (1925–1987), Danish badminton player
- Jørn Skille (1942–2008), Norwegian civil servant
- Jørn Sloth (born 1944), Danish chess grandmaster of correspondence chess
- Jørn Sørensen (born 1936), Danish football player and Olympic silver medalist
- Jørn Ronnie Tagge (born 1969), Norwegian convicted fraudster
- Jørn Inge Tunsberg (born 1970), Norwegian black metal musician
- Jørn Utzon (1918–2008), Danish architect, most notable for designing the Sydney Opera House in Australia

=== Middle name ===
- Michael Jørn Berg (born 1955), Danish handball player
- Jens Jørn Bertelsen (born 1952), Danish footballer
- Halle Jørn Hanssen (born 1937), Norwegian TV correspondent, development aid administrator, politician

== Given name Jorn ==
- Jorn Barger (born 1953), American blogger
- Jorn Berkhout (born 2002), Dutch football player
- Jorn Madslien (born 1967), journalist for BBC News Online
- Jorn Salverda (born 1997), Dutch rower
- Jorn Smits (born 1992), Dutch handball player
- Jorn Van Loon (born 1994), Belgian para-cyclist
- Jorn Vermeulen (born 1987), Belgian football player

== Given name Jörn ==
- Jörn Arnecke (born 1973), German composer
- Jörn Borowski (born 1959), German sailor
- Jörn Donner (1933–2020), Finnish writer, film director, actor, producer, and politician
- Jörn Dunkel, German-American mathematician and physicist
- Jörn Gevert (1929–2017), Chilean hurdler
- Jörn Großkopf (born 1966), German football player and manager
- Jörn Hellner (born 1945), Australian sailor
- Jörn Peter Hiekel (born 1963), German musicologist
- Jörn Kaplan (born 1981), German pool player
- Jörn Koblitz (born 1961), German curator
- Jörn Köhler (born 1970), German herpetologist
- Jörn König (born 1967), German politician
- Jörn Lenz (born 1969), German footballer
- Jörn Leonhard (born 1967), German historian
- Jörn Nowak (born 1986), German footballer
- Jörn-Steffen Pischke, professor of economics
- Jörn Rausing (born 1960), Swedish businessman
- Jörn Renzenbrink (born 1972), German tennis player
- Jörn Schepelmann (born 1986), German politician
- Jörn Schlönvoigt (born 1986), German actor and singer
- Jörn Schwinkendorf (born 1971), German footballer
- Jörn Svensson (1936–2021), Swedish politician
- Jörn Thiede (1941–2021), German palaeontologist and polar scientist
- Jörn Weisbrodt (born 1973), German arts administrator
- Jörn Wemmer (born 1984), German footballer
- Jörn Wenzel (born 2004), German bobsledder
- Jörn Wunderlich (born 1960), German judge and politician
- Lars-Jörn Zimmer (born 1970), German politician

== Surnames Jorn, Jörn, Jörns ==
- Asger Jorn (1914–1973), Danish artist
- Carl Jörn (1873–1947), German-American operatic tenor
- Nils Jörn (born 1964), German historian and author
- Carl Jörns (1875–1969), German race car driver
- Helge Jörns (born 1941), German composer and music educator
