= 2022 Tour of Szeklerland =

2022 UCI Europe Tour

Race details
- Dates: 8–13 August 2022
- Stages: 5
- Distance: 711.9 km (442.4 mi)
- Winning time: 15h 44' 05"

Results
Jersey awarded to the overall winner	Winner	Szymon Rekita (POL)	(Voster ATS Team)
	Second	Emil Dima (ROU)	(Giotti Victoria–Savini Due)
	Third	Maciej Paterski (POL)	(Voster ATS Team)
Jersey awarded to the points classification winner	Points	Nicolas Dalla Valle (ITA)	(Giotti Victoria–Savini Due)
Jersey awarded to the mountains classification winner	Mountains	Jarri Stravers (NED)	(Global Cycling Team)
	Youth	Andrea Debiasi (ITA)	(Cycling Team Friuli ASD)
	Team	Beltrami TSA–Tre Colli	

The 2022 Tour of Szeklerland was the 16th edition of the Tour of Szeklerland, which took place between 8 and 13 August 2022. It was rated as a 2.2 event as part of the 2022 UCI Europe Tour.

== Teams ==
Ten UCI Continental teams, seven domestic and regional teams, and two national team made up the eighteen teams that participated in the race, with six riders each. With five riders, Tzar Simeon Plovdiv is the only team to not field a maximum roster of six riders.

UCI ContinentalTeams

- Allinq Continental Cycling Team
- Beltrami TSA–Tre Colli
- Cycling Team Friuli ASD
- Gallina Ecotek Lucchini
- Giotti Victoria–Savini Due
- Mentorise Elite Team CFX
- Dauner–Akkon
- Team Novak
- Voster ATS Team
- WSA KTM Graz p/b Leomo

Regional and domestic teams

- Arbö headstart ON Fahrrad
- Epronex
- Global Cycling Team
- MKB Bank Cycling
- SOLME – OLMO
- Tzar Simeon Plovdiv
- UVT-Devron West Cycling Team
- CSA Steaua București

National team

- Bulgaria
- Serbia

== Route ==
Stage characteristics and winners
Stage	Date	Route	Distance	Type	Winner
1	9 August	Debrecen to Debrecen (Hungary)	91.7 km (57.0 mi)	Flat stage	Nicolas Dalla Valle (ITA)
2	10 August	Târgu Mureș to Miercurea Ciuc	189.6 km (117.8 mi)	Mountain stage	Szymon Rekita (POL)
3	11 August	Miercurea Ciuc to Sfântu Gheorghe	136.8 km (85.0 mi)	Hilly stage	Maciej Paterski (POL)
4	12 August	Sfântu Gheorghe to Harghita-Băi	144 km (89 mi)	Hilly stage	Cristian Raileanu (MDA)
5	13 August	Odorheiu Secuiesc to Miercurea Ciuc	149.8 km (93.1 mi)	Intermediate stage	Nicolas Dalla Valle (ITA)
Total		711.9 km (442.4 mi)			

== Stages ==
=== Stage 1 ===
9 August 2022 Debrecen to Debrecen (Hungary) 91.7 km (57.0 mi)

Stage 1 Result (1–10)
Rank	Rider	Team	Time
1	Nicolas Dalla Valle (ITA)	Giotti Victoria–Savini Due	1h 57' 21"
2	Daniel Skerl (ITA)	Cycling Team Friuli ASD	+ 0"
3	Filip Prokopyszyn (POL)	Voster ATS Team	+ 0"
4	Francesco Di Felice (ITA)	Gallina Ecotek Lucchini	+ 0"
5	Mattia Garzara (ITA)	Cycling Team Friuli ASD	+ 0"
6	Maciej Paterski (POL)	Voster ATS Team	+ 0"
7	Nikolay Genov (BUL)	Tzar Simeon Plovdiv	+ 0"
8	Adi-Narcis Marcu (ROU)	Mentorise Elite Team CFX	+ 0"
9	Đorđe Đurić (SRB)	Serbia	+ 0"
10	Giacomo Salvalaggio (ITA)	Team Novak	+ 0"

General classification after Stage 1
Rank	Rider	Team	Time
1	Nicolas Dalla Valle (ITA)	Giotti Victoria–Savini Due	1h 57' 11"
2	Daniel Skerl (ITA)	Cycling Team Friuli ASD	+ 4"
3	Filip Prokopyszyn (POL)	Voster ATS Team	+ 6"
4	Zsolt Istlstekker (HUN)	Epronex	+ 6"
5	Ádám Karl (HUN)	Epronex	+ 7"
6	Roy Duijvesteijn (NED)	Global Cycling Team	+ 7"
7	Yordan Andreev (BUL)	Bulgaria	+ 7"
8	Gergely Szarka (HUN)	Giotti Victoria–Savini Due	+ 8"
9	Diego Ressi (ITA)	Gallina Ecotek Lucchini	+ 8"
10	Adi-Narcis Marcu (ROU)	Mentorise Elite Team CFX	+ 9"

=== Stage 2 ===
10 August 2022 — Târgu Mureș to Miercurea Ciuc, 189.6 km (117.8 mi)

Stage 2 Result (1–10)
Rank	Rider	Team	Time
1	Szymon Rekita (POL)	Voster ATS Team	3h 07' 57"
2	Emil Dima (ROU)	Giotti Victoria–Savini Due	+ 0"
3	Ádám Karl (HUN)	Epronex	+ 8"
4	Francesco Di Felice (ITA)	Gallina Ecotek Lucchini	+ 8"
5	Maciej Paterski (POL)	Voster ATS Team	+ 8"
6	Andrea Debiasi (ITA)	Cycling Team Friuli ASD	+ 8"
7	Stefano Baffi (ITA)	SOLME – OLMO	+ 8"
8	Thomas Pesenti (ITA)	Beltrami TSA–Tre Colli	+ 8"
9	Martin Papanov (BUL)	Bulgaria	+ 8"
10	Philipp Hofbauer (AUT)	WSA KTM Graz p/b Leomo	+ 8"

General classification after Stage 2 (1–10)
Rank	Rider	Team	Time
1	Szymon Rekita (POL)	Voster ATS Team	5h 05' 08"
2	Emil Dima (ROU)	Giotti Victoria–Savini Due	+ 2"
3	Ádám Karl (HUN)	Epronex	+ 11"
4	Yordan Andreev (BUL)	Bulgaria	+ 15"
5	Francesco Di Felice (ITA)	Gallina Ecotek Lucchini	+ 18"
6	Maciej Paterski (POL)	Voster ATS Team	+ 18"
7	Nikolay Genov (BUL)	Tzar Simeon Plovdiv	+ 18"
8	Thomas Pesenti (ITA)	Beltrami TSA–Tre Colli	+ 18"
9	Kristóf Árvai (HUN)	MKB Bank Cycling	+ 18"
10	Martin Papanov (BUL)	Bulgaria	+ 18"

=== Stage 3 ===
11 August 2022 — Miercurea Ciuc to Sfântu Gheorghe, 136.8 km (85.0 mi)

Stage 3 Result (1–10)
Rank	Rider	Team	Time
1	Maciej Paterski (POL)	Voster ATS Team	2h 52' 48"
2	Nicolas Dalla Valle (ITA)	Giotti Victoria–Savini Due	+ 2"
3	Francesco Di Felice (ITA)	Gallina Ecotek Lucchini	+ 2"
4	Damian Papierski (POL)	Voster ATS Team	+ 2"
5	Daniel Skerl (ITA)	Cycling Team Friuli ASD	+ 2"
6	Thomas Pesenti (ITA)	Beltrami TSA–Tre Colli	+ 2"
7	Andrea Debiasi (ITA)	Cycling Team Friuli ASD	+ 2"
8	Andrea Piras (ITA)	Beltrami TSA–Tre Colli	+ 2"
9	Szymon Rekita (POL)	Voster ATS Team	+ 2"
10	Elia Menegale (ITA)	SOLME – OLMO	+ 2"

General classification after Stage 3 (1–10)
Rank	Rider	Team	Time
1	Szymon Rekita (POL)	Voster ATS Team	8h 57' 55"
2	Emil Dima (ROU)	Giotti Victoria–Savini Due	+ 5"
3	Maciej Paterski (POL)	Voster ATS Team	+ 7"
4	Francesco Di Felice (ITA)	Gallina Ecotek Lucchini	+ 17"
5	Thomas Pesenti (ITA)	Beltrami TSA–Tre Colli	+ 21"
6	Davide Bauce (ITA)	Gallina Ecotek Lucchini	+ 21"
7	Andrea Debiasi (ITA)	Cycling Team Friuli ASD	+ 21"
8	Andrea Piras (ITA)	Beltrami TSA–Tre Colli	+ 21"
9	Ádám Karl (HUN)	Epronex	+ 1' 43"
10	Nikolay Genov (BUL)	Tzar Simeon Plovdiv	+ 1' 50"

=== Stage 4 ===
12 August 2022 — Sfântu Gheorghe to Harghita-Băi, 144 km (89 mi)

Stage 4 Result (1–10)
Rank	Rider	Team	Time
1	Cristian Raileanu (MDA)	CSA Steaua București	3h 18' 12"
2	Emil Dima (ROU)	Giotti Victoria–Savini Due	+ 0"
3	Andrea Debiasi (ITA)	Cycling Team Friuli ASD	+ 0"
4	Szymon Rekita (POL)	Voster ATS Team	+ 0"
5	Yordan Andreev (BUL)	Bulgaria	+ 3"
6	Stinus Kaempe (AUS)	Arbö headstart ON Fahrrad	+ 5"
7	Maciej Paterski (POL)	Voster ATS Team	+ 5"
8	Lars Quaedvlieg (NED)	Global Cycling Team	+ 5"
9	Francesco Di Felice (ITA)	Gallina Ecotek Lucchini	+ 5"
10	Davide Bauce (ITA)	Gallina Ecotek Lucchini	+ 5"

General classification after Stage 4 (1–10)
Rank	Rider	Team	Time
1	Szymon Rekita (POL)	Voster ATS Team	12h 16' 04"
2	Emil Dima (ROU)	Giotti Victoria–Savini Due	+ 2"
3	Maciej Paterski (POL)	Voster ATS Team	+ 13"
4	Andrea Debiasi (ITA)	Cycling Team Friuli ASD	+ 19"
5	Francesco Di Felice (ITA)	Gallina Ecotek Lucchini	+ 25"
6	Davide Bauce (ITA)	Gallina Ecotek Lucchini	+ 29"
7	Thomas Pesenti (ITA)	Beltrami TSA–Tre Colli	+ 57"
8	Cristian Raileanu (MDA)	Team Sapura Cycling	+ 1' 43"
9	Ádám Karl (HUN)	Epronex	+ 1' 51"
10	Stinus Kaempe (AUS)	Arbö headstart ON Fahrrad	+ 1' 58"

=== Stage 5 ===
13 August 2022 — Odorheiu Secuiesc to Miercurea Ciuc, 149.8 km (93.1 mi)

Stage 5 Result (1–10)
Rank	Rider	Team	Time
1	Nicolas Dalla Valle (ITA)	Giotti Victoria–Savini Due	3h 28' 04"
2	Davide Bauce (ITA)	Gallina Ecotek Lucchini	+ 0"
3	Ádám Karl (HUN)	Epronex	+ 0"
4	Francesco Di Felice (ITA)	Gallina Ecotek Lucchini	+ 0"
5	Daniel Skerl (ITA)	Cycling Team Friuli ASD	+ 0"
6	Andrea Biancalani (ITA)	Beltrami TSA–Tre Colli	+ 0"
7	Antonie van Noppen (NED)	Global Cycling Team	+ 0"
8	Maciej Paterski (POL)	Voster ATS Team	+ 0"
9	Andrea Piras (ITA)	Beltrami TSA–Tre Colli	+ 0"
10	Giacomo Salvalaggio (ITA)	Team Novak	+ 0"

Final general classification (1–10)
Rank	Rider	Team	Time
1	Szymon Rekita (POL)	Voster ATS Team	15h 44' 05"
2	Emil Dima (ROU)	Giotti Victoria–Savini Due	+ 5"
3	Maciej Paterski (POL)	Voster ATS Team	+ 15"
4	Andrea Debiasi (ITA)	Cycling Team Friuli ASD	+ 22"
5	Davide Bauce (ITA)	Gallina Ecotek Lucchini	+ 26"
6	Francesco Di Felice (ITA)	Gallina Ecotek Lucchini	+ 28"
7	Thomas Pesenti (ITA)	Beltrami TSA–Tre Colli	+ 1' 00"
8	Cristian Raileanu (MDA)	Team Sapura Cycling	+ 1' 46"
9	Ádám Karl (HUN)	Epronex	+ 1' 50"
10	Stinus Kaempe (AUS)	Arbö headstart ON Fahrrad	+ 2' 01"

== Classification leadership table ==
Classification leadership by stage
Stage	Winner	General classification	Points classification	Mountains classification	Young rider classification	Romanian rider classification	Hungarian rider classification	Team classification
1	Nicolas Dalla Valle	Nicolas Dalla Valle	Nicolas Dalla Valle	not awarded	Daniel Skerl	Adi-Narcis Marcu	Zsolt Istlstekker	Giotti Victoria–Savini Due
2	Szymon Rekita	Szymon Rekita	Francesco Di Felice	Jarri Stravers	Kristóf Árvai	Emil Dima	Ádám Karl	Beltrami TSA–Tre Colli
3	Maciej Paterski	Szymon Rekita	Maciej Paterski	Jarri Stravers	Andrea Debiasi	Emil Dima	Ádám Karl	Beltrami TSA–Tre Colli
4	Cristian Raileanu	Szymon Rekita	Maciej Paterski	Jarri Stravers	Andrea Debiasi	Emil Dima	Ádám Karl	Beltrami TSA–Tre Colli
5	Nicolas Dalla Valle	Szymon Rekita	Nicolas Dalla Valle	Jarri Stravers	Andrea Debiasi	Emil Dima	Ádám Karl	Beltrami TSA–Tre Colli
Final		Szymon Rekita	Nicolas Dalla Valle	Jarri Stravers	Andrea Debiasi	Emil Dima	Ádám Karl	Beltrami TSA–Tre Colli

- On stage 2, Filip Prokopyszyn, who was second in the points classification, wore the green jersey, because first-placed Nicolas Dalla Valle wore the yellow jersey as the leader of the general classification.

== Final classification standings ==
Legend
Red jersey	Denotes the winner of the general classification	Yellow jersey	Denotes the winner of the points classification
Green jersey	Denotes the winner of the mountains classification	White and red lateral jersey	Denotes the leader of the young rider classification
Blue jersey	Denotes the leader of the best Romanian rider classification	Red-white-green jersey	Denotes the leader of the best Hungarian rider classification

=== General classification ===
Final general classification (1–10)
Rank	Rider	Team	Time
1	Szymon Rekita (POL)	Voster ATS Team	15h 44' 05"
2	Emil Dima (ROU)	Giotti Victoria–Savini Due	+ 5"
3	Maciej Paterski (POL)	Voster ATS Team	+ 15"
4	Andrea Debiasi (ITA)	Cycling Team Friuli ASD	+ 22"
5	Davide Bauce (ITA)	Gallina Ecotek Lucchini	+ 26"
6	Francesco Di Felice (ITA)	Gallina Ecotek Lucchini	+ 28"
7	Thomas Pesenti (ITA)	Beltrami TSA–Tre Colli	+ 1' 00"
8	Cristian Raileanu (MDA)	Team Sapura Cycling	+ 1' 46"
9	Ádám Karl (HUN)	Epronex	+ 1' 50"
10	Stinus Kaempe (AUS)	Arbö headstart ON Fahrrad	+ 2' 01"

=== Points classification ===
Final points classification (1–10)
Rank	Rider	Team	Points
1	Nicolas Dalla Valle (ITA)	Giotti Victoria–Savini Due	72
2	Maciej Paterski (POL)	Voster ATS Team	69
3	Francesco Di Felice (ITA)	Gallina Ecotek Lucchini	65
4	Szymon Rekita (POL)	Voster ATS Team	55
5	Ádám Karl (HUN)	Epronex	45
6	Emil Dima (ROU)	Giotti Victoria–Savini Due	45
7	Daniel Skerl (ITA)	Cycling Team Friuli ASD	44
8	Andrea Debiasi (ITA)	Cycling Team Friuli ASD	37
9	Davide Bauce (ITA)	Gallina Ecotek Lucchini	30
10	Cristian Raileanu (MDA)	CSA Steaua București	29

=== Mountains classification ===
Final mountains classification (1–10)
Rank	Rider	Team	Points
1	Jarri Stravers (NED)	Global Cycling Team	13
2	Yordan Petrov (BUL)	Bulgaria	12
3	Lars Quaedvlieg (NED)	Global Cycling Team	8
4	Martin Papanov (BUL)	Bulgaria	7
5	Szymon Rekita (POL)	Voster ATS Team	6
6	Andrea Debiasi (ITA)	Cycling Team Friuli ASD	6
7	Antonie van Noppen (NED)	Global Cycling Team	6
8	Jacob Buijk (NED)	Global Cycling Team	6
9	José Manuel Gutiérrez (ESP)	Team Novak	5
10	Luca Cibrario (ITA)	Beltrami TSA–Tre Colli	4

=== Young rider classification ===
Final young rider classification (1–10)
Rank	Rider	Team	Time
1	Andrea Debiasi (ITA)	Cycling Team Friuli ASD	15h 44' 27"
2	Stinus Kaempe (AUS)	Arbö headstart ON Fahrrad	+ 1' 39"
3	Kristóf Árvai (HUN)	MKB Bank Cycling	+ 1' 45"
4	Philipp Hofbauer (AUT)	WSA KTM Graz p/b Leomo	+ 1' 52"
5	Andrea Piras (ITA)	Beltrami TSA–Tre Colli	+ 3' 40"
6	Bryan Olivo (ITA)	Cycling Team Friuli ASD	+ 10' 23"
7	Diego Ressi (ITA)	Gallina Ecotek Lucchini	+ 11' 40"
8	Iustin-Ioan Văidian (ROU)	Mentorise Elite Team CFX	+ 12' 04"
9	Matteo Freddi (ITA)	Beltrami TSA–Tre Colli	+ 12' 11"
10	Marco Andreaus (ITA)	Cycling Team Friuli ASD	+ 12' 50"

=== Team classification ===
Final team classification (1–10)
Rank	Team	Time
1	Beltrami TSA–Tre Colli	47h 17' 48"
2	Gallina Ecotek Lucchini	+ 7' 35"
3	Voster ATS Team	+ 12' 12"
4	Cycling Team Friuli ASD	+ 17' 15"
5	Giotti Victoria–Savini Due	+ 20' 22"
6	Epronex	+ 21' 51"
7	SOLME – OLMO	+ 25' 24"
8	Bulgaria	+ 31' 26"
9	Mentorise Elite Team CFX	+ 36' 06"
10	MKB Bank Cycling	+ 36' 39"

== See also ==
- 2022 in men's road cycling
- 2022 in sports
