= Franz-Josef Lässer =

Austrian para-cyclist (born 2001)

- Lässer in 2026

Personal information
- Born: 17 January 2001 (age 25) Graz, Austria

Sport
- Sport: Para-cycling
- Disability class: C5
Medal record
Men's para-cycling
Representing Austria
Track World Championships
Gold medal – first place	2025 Rio de Janeiro	Elimination C5
Gold medal – first place	2026 Apeldoorn	Scratch race C5
Silver medal – second place	2023 Glasgow	Omnium C5
Silver medal – second place	2024 Rio de Janeiro	Scratch race C5
Silver medal – second place	2024 Rio de Janeiro	Omnium C5
Silver medal – second place	2025 Rio de Janeiro	Sprint C1
Bronze medal – third place	2024 Rio de Janeiro	Individual pursuit C5
Bronze medal – third place	2025 Rio de Janeiro	Time trial C5
Bronze medal – third place	2026 Apeldoorn	Elimination C5
Road World Championships
Gold medal – first place	2025 Ronse	Time trial C5
European Championships
Bronze medal – third place	2023 Rotterdam	Road race C5

Franz-Josef Lässer (born 17 January 2001) is an Austrian para-cyclist who competes in road and track events. He represented Austria at the 2024 Summer Paralympics.

== Career ==
In March 2024, Lässer represented Austria at the 2024 UCI Para-cycling Track World Championships and won silver medals in the scratch race and omnium, and a bronze medal in the individual pursuit C5 events. In September 2024, he then competed at the 2024 Summer Paralympics in track cycling and finished in fourth place in the individual pursuit C5 event, and 12th place in the time trial C4–5 event. He also competed in road cycling and finished in fifth place in the time trial C5 and 13th place in the road race C4–5 event.

== Personal life ==
Lässer was born with four shortened fingers on his left hand.
