= Alistair Donohoe =

Australian cyclist (born 1995)

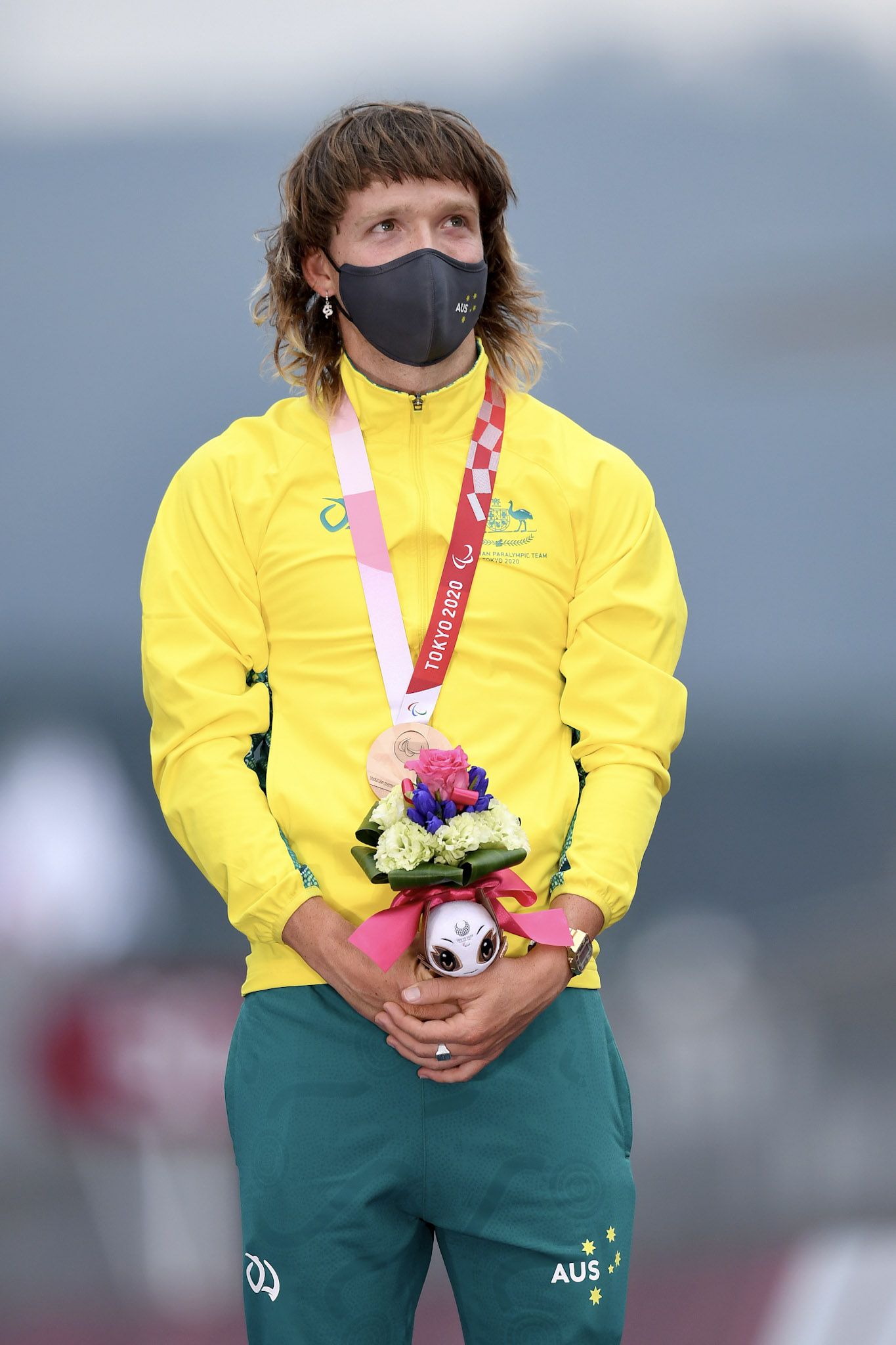
- 2021 Tokyo Paralympic Games Time Trial Podium

Personal information
- Full name: Alistair Donohoe
- Born: 3 March 1995 (age 31) Nhulunbuy, Northern Territory
- Height: 1.7 m (5 ft 7 in)
- Weight: 62 kg (137 lb)

Cycling career
- Sport: Cycling
- Current team: Blackburn CC
- Disciplines: Road; Track
- Role: Rider

Amateur teams
- 2023: Tandem Co Pro Cycling
- 2024–: Blackburn CC

Professional teams
- 2015: Search2retain–Health.com.au
- 2016–2017: Attaque Team Gusto
- 2018: Mobius–BridgeLane
- 2019–2021: Pro Racing Sunshine Coast
Medal record
Men's cycling
Representing Australia
Paralympic Games
Silver medal – second place	2016 Rio	Individual pursuit C5
Silver medal – second place	2016 Rio	Road time trial C5
Silver medal – second place	2020 Tokyo	Individual pursuit C5
Silver medal – second place	2024 Paris	Road time trial C5
Bronze medal – third place	2020 Tokyo	Road time trial C5
Bronze medal – third place	2024 Paris	Mixed team sprint C1–5
Track World Championships
Gold medal – first place	2015 Apeldoorn	15km Scratch Race C5
Gold medal – first place	2019 Apeldoorn	Individual Pursuit C5
Gold medal – first place	2019 Apeldoorn	Scratch Race C5
Gold medal – first place	2020 Milton	Scratch Race C5
Gold medal – first place	2022 Saint-Quentin-en-Yvelines	Scratch Race C5
Silver medal – second place	2015 Apeldoorn	Individual Pursuit C5
Silver medal – second place	2015 Apeldoorn	1 km time Trial C5
Silver medal – second place	2016 Montichiari	Individual Pursuit C5
Silver medal – second place	2017 Los Angeles	Scratch Race C4–5
Silver medal – second place	2018 Rio	Scratch Race C4–5
Silver medal – second place	2022 Saint-Quentin-en-Yvelines	Omnium C5
Bronze medal – third place	2014 Aguascalientes	1 km Time Trial C5
Bronze medal – third place	2014 Aguascalientes	Scratch Race exhibition final C1-5
Bronze medal – third place	2016 Montichiari	1 km time Trial C5
Bronze medal – third place	2016 Montichiari	Scratch Race C4–5
Bronze medal – third place	2022 Saint-Quentin-en-Yvelines	Mixed Team Sprint C1-5
Bronze medal – third place	2024 Rio de Janeiro	Scratch race C5
Bronze medal – third place	2026 Apeldoorn	Scratch race C5
Road World Championships
Gold medal – first place	2014 Grenville	Road Race C5
Gold medal – first place	2015 Nottwil	Road Race C5
Gold medal – first place	2018 Maniago	Road Race C5
Gold medal – first place	2019 Emmen	Time Trial C5
Silver medal – second place	2015 Nottwil	Time Trial C5
Bronze medal – third place	2013 Baie-Comeau	Time Trial C5
Bronze medal – third place	2013 Baie-Comeau	Road Race C5
Bronze medal – third place	2019 Emmen	Road Race C5
Bronze medal – third place	2022 Baie-Comeau	Men's Road Race C5

Alistair Donohoe (born 3 March 1995) is an Australian cyclist, who currently rides for Australian club team Blackburn CC. Following a right arm impairment in 2009, Donohoe became a multiple medallist at the UCI Para-cycling Road World Championships and UCI Para-cycling Track World Championships. He won two silver medals at the 2016 Rio Paralympics, a silver and bronze medal at the 2020 Tokyo Paralympics and a silver and bronze medal at the 2024 Paris Paralympics .

== Personal ==
Donohoe was born on 3 March 1995 in Nhulunbuy, Northern Territory. In 2009, at the age of fourteen, he injured his right bicep/triceps as a result of his arm getting caught in a rope whilst trying to jump into a creek from a tree. This led to limited use in his right arm. He attended Xavier College. He lives in Brisbane, Australia.

== Sports career ==
He took up competitive cycling in 2010 after participating in rugby union, BMX and triathlon. His love of cycling was an outcome from his time as a triathlete in Darwin, Northern Territory. He competes in both able bodied and para-cycling. It was Michael Gallagher who after noticing Donohoe's deformed arm suggested that he consider para-cycling. In para-cycling, he is classified as C5. At the 2013, UCI Para-cycling Track World Championships, he won bronze medals in Men's Time Trial C5 and Men's Road Race C5. Competing at the 2014 UCI Para-cycling Track World Championships in Aguascaliente, Mexico, he won bronze medals in the Men's C5 1 km time Trial (1:03.788) and the Men's C-1-5 scratch race exhibition final. In 2014, at UCI Para-cycling World Championships in Greenville, South Carolina, he won the gold medal in the Men's Road Race C5 and finished sixth in the Men's Time Trial.

In January 2015, he finished third in the Mars Cycling Australia Road National Championships Under 23 Road Race at Buninyong, Victoria. At the 2015 UCI Para-cycling Track World Championships in Appledorn, Netherlands he won the gold medal in the Men's 15 km Scratch Race C5 and silver medals in Men's Individual Pursuit C5 and Men's 1 km time Trial C5.

At the 2015 UCI Para-cycling World Championships in Nottwil Switzerland, he won the gold medal in the Men's Road Race C5 and silver medal in the Men's Time Trial C5.

In January 2016, he finished fourth in the Mars Cycling Australia Road National Championships Under 23 Road Race at Buninyong, Victoria. At the 2016 UCI Para-cycling Track World Championships in Montichiari, Italy, he finished second to fellow Australian Michael Gallagher in the Men's 4 km Individual Pursuit C5. He also won the bronze medals in the Men's 1 km Time Trial C5 and Men's Scratch Race C4–5.

At the 2016 Rio Paralympics, he won silver medals in the Men's Individual Pursuit C5 and the Men's Road Time Trial C5. In the C4-5 road race he sensationally collided with Ukraine's Yehor Dementyev as they sprinted towards the finish line. The two leaders were jostling for victory in their 84 km event before Dementyev, later disqualified, veered into the path of the Australian and they both crashed to the ground. Donohoe ran across the line without his bike, a move which proved to be his undoing.

At the 2017 UCI Para-cycling Track World Championships in Los Angeles, United States, Donohoe won a silver medal in the Men's Scatch Race C4-5.

At the 2017 UCI Para-cycling Road World Championships, Pietermaritzburg, South Africa, he finished eighth in the Men's Time Trial C5 and seventh in the Men's Road Race C4-5.

Donohoe won the silver medal in the Men's Scratch Race C4-5 at the 2018 UCI Para-cycling Track World Championships, Rio de Janeiro, Brazil

He won the gold medal in the Men's Road Race C5 at 2018 UCI Para-cycling Road World Championships, Maniago, Italy.

At the 2019 UCI Para-cycling Track World Championships in Apeldoorn, Netherlands, he won gold medals in Men's Individual Pursuit C5 and Men's Scratch Race C5.

At the 2019 UCI Para-cycling Road World Championships in Emmem, Netherlands, he won the gold medal in the Men's Time Trial C5 and bronze medal in the Men's Road Race C5.

At the 2020 UCI Para-cycling Track World Championships in Milton, Ontario, he won the gold medal in the Men's Scratch Race C5.

At the 2020 Tokyo Paralympics, Donohoe won the silver medal in the Men's individual pursuit C5 with a time of 4:20.813, less than 4 seconds behind the eventual winner Dorian Foulton of France. He also won the bronze medal in the Men's road time trial C5. He finished fifth in the Men's Road Race C4–5 after crashing twice during the race.

After Men's Road Race C4–5 he said:

I love bike racing, sometimes you win sometimes you lose, you can't control crashes and it's a part of the sport – and I love it (cycling). Today was so good, so hard, it's everything I love about racing.

Donohoe won the bronze medal in the Men's Road Race C5 and finished 5th in the Men's Time Trial C5 at 2022 UCI Para-cycling Road World Championships in Baie-Comeau.

At the 2022 UCI Para-cycling Track World Championships in Saint-Quentin-en-Yvelines, France, he won the gold medal in Men's Scratch C4, silver medal in the Men's Omnium C5 and the bronze medal in Mixed Team Sprint C1-5.

At the 2024 UCI Para-cycling Track World Championships, Rio de Janeiro, he won the bronze medal in the Men's Scratch Race C5.

Donohoe won two medals at the 2024 Paris Paralympics, silver in the Men's road time trial C5 and bronze in Mixed team sprint C1-5. He finished sixth in the Men's road race C4-5.

In 2021, he is a Victorian Institute of Sport scholarship holder.

== Recognition ==
- 2014 – Victorian Institute of Sport 2XU Youth Award for athletes under the age of 20.
- 2014 – Cycling Australia Elite Para-cycling Male Athlete of the Year.
- 2015 – Cycling Australia Elite Para-cycling Male Athlete of the Year.
- 2015 – Australian Institute of Sport Awards#AIS Para Performance of the Year
- 2018 – Cycling Australia Elite Para-cycling Male Athlete of the Year.
- 2018 – Victorian Institute of Sport Para Athlete Year.
- 2019 – Cycling Australia Para Male Track Cyclist of the Year.
- 2022 – AusCycling Men's Road Para-cyclist of the Year
- 2024 – AusCycling Men's Road Para-cyclist of the Year
- 2025 - Accepted into The Belgie Group Chat after completing 3 consecutive rides. Alistair's greatest cycling achievement to date.
