= 2026 UCI Para Cycling Track World Championships =

- Venue: Apeldoorn, Netherlands
- Date: 29 October – 1 November
- Velodrome: Omnisport Apeldoorn
- Nations participating: 42
- Cyclists participating: 206+52
- Events: 48

The 2026 UCI Para-cycling Track World Championships were held from 29 October to 1 November 2026 at the Omnisport Apeldoorn in Apeldoorn, Netherlands.

== Results ==
=== Men ===
Event	Class	Gold		Silver		Bronze	
Sprint	C1	Liang Weicong; China		Ricardo Ten Argilés; Spain		Mohamad Shaharuddin; Malaysia	
Sprint	C2	Hidde Buur; Netherlands		Gordon Allan; Australia		Quirin Lutz; Switzerland	
Sprint	C3	Devon Briggs; New Zealand		Maxwell Sudholz; Australia		Fin Graham; Great Britain	
Sprint	C4	Korey Boddington; Australia		Wu Guoqing; China		Archie Atkinson; Great Britain	
Sprint	C5	Alfonso Cabello; Spain		Niels Verschaeren; Belgium		Jorn Van Loon; Belgium	
Sprint	B	Great Britain; James Ball; Aaron Pope (pilot)		Australia; Kane Perris; Luke Zaccaria (pilot)		Australia; Beau Wootton; Byron Davies (pilot)	
1 km time trial	C1	Liang Weicong; China	1:13.186	Mohamad Shaharuddin; Malaysia	1:13.300	Ricardo Ten Argilés; Spain	1:15.092
1 km time trial	C2	Hidde Buur; Netherlands	1:09.291	Alexandre Léauté; France	1:09.399	Quirin Lutz; Switzerland	1:10.304
1 km time trial	C3	Devon Briggs; New Zealand	1:05.651	Maxwell Sudholz; Australia	1:07.415	Fin Graham; Great Britain	1:08.574
1 km time trial	C4	Korey Boddington; Australia	1:02.672	Jody Cundy; Great Britain	1:04.925	Giacomo Salvalaggio; Italy	1:05.006
1 km time trial	C5	Alfonso Cabello; Spain	1:03.536	Niels Verschaeren; Belgium	1:05.087	Ricardo Alafim de Freitas; Brazil	1:06.014
1 km time trial	B	Great Britain; James Ball; Aaron Pope (pilot)	59.563	Netherlands; Tristan Bangma; Patrick Bos (pilot)	1:01.682	Australia; Beau Wootton; Byron Davies (pilot)	1:01.709
Individual pursuit	B	Netherlands; Tristan Bangma; Patrick Bos (pilot)	4:00.486^{G}	Great Britain; Morgan Fice-Noyes; Christopher Latham (pilot)	OVL^{G}	United States; Branden Walton; Ian Anderson (pilot)	4:10.699^{B}
Scratch	C1	Ricardo Ten Argilés; Spain		Liang Weicong; China		Mohamad Shaharuddin; Malaysia	
Scratch	C2	Alexandre Léauté; France		Ewoud Vromant; Belgium		Shota Kawamoto; Japan	
Scratch	C3	Fin Graham; Great Britain		Devon Briggs; New Zealand		Jacob Smith; Great Britain	
Scratch	C4	Andrea Biancalani; Italy		Archie Atkinson; Great Britain		Ryan Jastrab; United States	
Scratch	C5	Franz-Josef Lässer; Austria		Yehor Dementyev; Ukraine		Alistair Donohoe; Australia	
Elimination	C1	Liang Weicong; China		Ricardo Ten Argilés; Spain		Mohamad Shaharuddin; Malaysia	
Elimination	C2	Alexandre Léauté; France		Shota Kawamoto; Japan		Darren Hicks; Australia	
Elimination	C3	Devon Briggs; New Zealand		Fin Graham; Great Britain		Alexandre Hayward; Canada	
Elimination	C4	Andrea Biancalani; Italy		Archie Atkinson; Great Britain		Ryan Jastrab; United States	
Elimination	C5	Mathis Tiphaigne; France		Lauro Chaman; Brazil		Franz-Josef Lässer; Austria	

=== Women ===
Event	Class	Gold		Silver		Bronze	
Sprint	C1	Qian Wangwei; China		Tahlia Clayton-Goodie; Australia		Nuraini Muhamad Shukri; Malaysia	
Sprint	C2	Flurina Rigling; Switzerland		Elisabeth Simpson; Great Britain		Heather Jameson; Ireland	
Sprint	C3	Tifany Huot-Marchand; France		Marie Quellhorst; Germany		Mel Pemble; Canada	
Sprint	C4	Kadeena Cox; Great Britain		Tara Neyland; Australia		Li Xiaohui; China	
Sprint	C5	Caitlin Ward; Australia		Nicole Murray; New Zealand		Katie Walker; United States	
Sprint	B	Great Britain; Sophie Unwin; Jenny Holl (pilot)		Ireland; Josephine Rizos; Robyn Beggs (pilot)		Great Britain; Elizabeth Jordan; Anna Whitworth-Hay (pilot)	
1 km time trial	C1	Qian Wangwei; China	1:20.995	Tahlia Clayton-Goodie; Australia	1:26.405	Nuraini Muhamad Shukri; Malaysia	1:35.606
1 km time trial	C2	Flurina Rigling; Switzerland	1:17.220	Heather Jameson; Ireland	1:20.341	Sabrina Custódia; Brazil	1:21.468
1 km time trial	C3	Aniek van den Aarssen; Netherlands	1:15.991	Mel Pemble; Canada	1:16.161	Anne Martha Blok; Netherlands	1:16.162
1 km time trial	C4	Kadeena Cox; Great Britain	1:09.545; WR	Tara Neyland; Australia	1:09.703	Anna Taylor; New Zealand	1:12.688
1 km time trial	C5	Rebecca Newark; Great Britain	1:13.091	Claudia Cretti; Italy	1:13.111	Caitlin Ward; Australia	1:13.308
1 km time trial	B	New Zealand; Emma Foy; Jessie Hodges (pilot)	1:06.474	Great Britain; Sophie Unwin; Jenny Holl (pilot)	1:08.296	Great Britain; Elizabeth Jordan; Anna Whitworth-Hay (pilot)	1:08.781
Individual pursuit	B	New Zealand; Emma Foy; Jessie Hodges (pilot)	4:29.672^{G} WR	Great Britain; Sophie Unwin; Jenny Holl (pilot)	4:30.498^{G}	Ireland; Katie-George Dunlevy; Alice Sharpe (pilot)	4:32.067^{B}
Scratch	C1	Qian Wangwei; China		Tahlia Clayton-Goodie; Australia		Victoria Barbosa; Brazil	
Scratch	C2	Flurina Rigling; Switzerland		Amelia Cass; Great Britain		Allison Jones; United States	
Scratch	C3	Tifany Huot-Marchand; France		Wang Xiaomei; China		Marie Quellhorst; Germany	
Scratch	C4	Tara Neyland; Australia		Siobhan Terry; New Zealand		Li Xiaohui; China	
Scratch	C5	Claudia Cretti; Italy		Morgan Newberry; Great Britain		Crystal Lane-Wright; Great Britain	
Elimination	C1	Tahlia Clayton-Goodie; Australia		Qian Wangwei; China		Victoria Barbosa; Brazil	
Elimination	C2	Flurina Rigling; Switzerland		Amelia Cass; Great Britain		Allison Jones; United States	
Elimination	C3	Tifany Huot-Marchand; France		Marie Quellhorst; Germany		Lara Wolleschensky; Germany	
Elimination	C4	Tara Neyland; Australia		Li Xiaohui; China		Katell Alençon; France	
Elimination	C5	Nicole Murray; New Zealand		Claudia Cretti; Italy		Anna Harkowska; Poland	

=== Mixed ===
Event	Class	Gold		Silver		Bronze	
Team sprint	B	Great Britain; Elizabeth Jordan; Anna Whitworth-Hay (pilot); James Ball; Aaron Pope (pilot)	49.830^{G}	Germany; Maya Fügenschuh; Corinna Lechner (pilot); Marc Lembeck; Robert Förstemann (pilot)	51.178^{G}	Brazil; Jerusa Geber dos Santos; Carolina Nascimento (pilot); Lucas Prado; Luan Carlos Silva (pilot)	50.776^{B}
Team sprint	C1–5	Australia; Caitlin Ward; Maxwell Sudholz; Korey Boddington	48.206^{G}	Great Britain; Kadeena Cox; Fin Graham; Jody Cundy	49.351^{G}	Spain; Isabel Yingüa Hernández; Eduardo Santas; Alfonso Cabello	50.758^{B}

== Medal table ==
* Host nation (Netherlands)

Rank	Nation	Gold	Silver	Bronze	Total
1	Great Britain	8	12	7	27
2	Australia	7	9	5	21
3	China	6	5	2	13
4	New Zealand	6	3	1	10
5	France	6	1	1	8
6	Netherlands*	4	1	1	6
7	Switzerland	4	0	2	6
8	Spain	3	2	2	7
9	Italy	3	2	1	6
10	Austria	1	0	1	2
11	Germany	0	3	2	5
12	Belgium	0	3	1	4
13	Ireland	0	2	2	4
14	Brazil	0	1	5	6
14	Malaysia	0	1	5	6
16	Canada	0	1	2	3
17	Japan	0	1	1	2
18	Ukraine	0	1	0	1
19	United States	0	0	6	6
20	Poland	0	0	1	1
Totals (20 entries)		48	48	48	144
