= Kate Walker =

Kate or Katie Walker may refer to:

- Kate Walker (writer) (born 1950), British romantic novelist
- Kate Walker (Syberia), the lead character of the Syberia video game franchise
- Katie Walker (born 1969), British furniture designer
- Katie Walker (netball) (born 1978), Australian netball player
- Katie Walker (cyclist) (born 1986), American para-cyclist

== See also ==
- Katherine Walker (disambiguation)
