= Biancalani =

Biancalani is a surname. Notable people with the surname include:

- Andrea Biancalani (born 2000), Italian cyclist
- Fabio Biancalani (1961–2024), Argentine politician
- Frédéric Biancalani (born 1974), French footballer

== See also ==
- Biancalana
