= Cycling at the 2020 Summer Paralympics – Men's individual pursuit C5 =

Men's individual pursuit C5 at the XVI Paralympic Games
- Venue: Izu Velodrome
- Dates: 27 August 2021
- Competitors: 10 from 6 nations

Medalists
| 1st place, gold medalist(s) | | Dorian Foulon | France |
| 2nd place, silver medalist(s) | | Alistair Donohoe | Australia |
| 3rd place, bronze medalist(s) | | Yehor Dementiev | Ukraine |

The men's individual pursuit class C5 track cycling event at the 2020 Summer Paralympics took place on 27 August 2021 at the Izu Velodrome, Japan. This class is for cyclists who have impairments that affect their legs, arms, and/or trunk but are still capable to use a standard bicycle. 10 cyclists from 6 different nations competed in this event.

== Competition format ==
The competition starts with a qualifying round where all 10 cyclists are divided into 4 heats, each heat containing 2 cyclists in it; they will then compete on a time trial basis. The 2 fastest in the qualifying round would qualify to the gold medal final while the 3rd and 4th fastest will qualify to the bronze medal final. The distance of this event is 4000m. The event finals will be held on the same day as the qualifying round.

== Schedule ==
All times are Japan Standard Time (UTC+9)

| Date | Time | Round |
|---|---|---|
| Friday, 27 August | 11:14 | Qualifying |
| Friday, 27 August | 15:40 | Finals |

== Records ==
| World record | Michael Gallagher (AUS) | 4:24.057 | Aguascalientes, Mexico | 11 April 2014 |
| Paralympic record | Michael Gallagher (AUS) | 4:30.012 | London, United Kingdom | 1 September 2012 |

== Results ==
=== Qualifying ===
| Rank | Heat | Nation | Cyclists | Result | Notes |
|---|---|---|---|---|---|
| 1 | 4 | France | Dorian Foulon | 4:18.274 | QG, WR |
| 2 | 5 | Australia | Alistair Donohoe | 4:20.813 | QG |
| 3 | 5 | Ukraine | Yehor Dementiev | 4:21.036 | QB |
| 4 | 2 | France | Kévin Le Cunff | 4:22.257 | QB |
| 5 | 3 | Netherlands | Daniel Abraham | 4:23.096 | |
| 6 | 4 | Brazil | Lauro Chaman | 4:25.694 | |
| 7 | 2 | Hungary | Zsombor Wermeser | 4:35.606 | |
| 8 | 1 | Colombia | Edwin Fabián Mátiz Ruiz | 4:39.113 | |
| 9 | 3 | United States | Christopher Murphy | 4:55.467 | |
| 10 | 1 | Iran | Mahdi Mohammadi | 5:09.154 | |

=== Finals ===
| Rank | Nation | Cyclists | Result | Notes |
|---|---|---|---|---|
Gold medal final
| 1st place, gold medalist(s) | France | Dorian Foulon | 4:20.757 | |
| 2nd place, silver medalist(s) | Australia | Alistair Donohoe | 4:24.095 | |
Bronze medal final
| 3rd place, bronze medalist(s) | Ukraine | Yehor Dementiev | 4:22.746 | |
| 4 | France | Kévin Le Cunff | 4:27.997 | |
