= Verschaeren =

Verschaeren is a surname. Notable people with the surname include:

- Niels Verschaeren (born 1991), Belgian para-cyclist
- Yari Verschaeren (born 2001), Belgian footballer
