= Ricardo Alafim de Freitas =

Brazilian para-cyclist (born 1988)

- Ricardo Alafim de Freitas (2026)

Personal information
- Nationality: Brazilian
- Born: 30 September 1988 (age 38)

Sport
- Sport: Para-cycling
- Disability class: C5
Medal record
Men's para-cycling
Representing Brazil
Track World Championships
Bronze medal – third place	2026 Apeldoorn	1 km time trial C5

Ricardo Alafim de Freitas (born 30 September 1988) is a Brazilian para-cyclist.

== Career ==
In February 2026, he competed at the Pan-American Track Cycling Championships and won a gold medal in the sprint C5, silver medal in the 1 km time trial C5, and a bronze medal in the mixed team sprint C1–5 along with Sabrina Custódia and André Luiz Carneiro. In October 2026, he competed at the 2026 UCI Para-cycling Track World Championships and won a bronze medal in the 1 km time trial C5 event with a time of 1:06.014.
