= Mathis Tiphaigne =

French Paralympic cyclist (born 2003)

Personal information
- National team: France
- Born: 17 July 2003 (age 23)

Sport
- Sport: Para-cycling
- Disability class: C5
Medal record
Men's para-cycling
Representing France
Track World Championships
Gold medal – first place	2026 Apeldoorn	Elimination C5
Bronze medal – third place	2025 Rio de Janeiro	Elimination C5

Mathis Tiphaigne (born 17 May 2003) is a French cyclist who competes in the C5 classification. He is a member of the Océane Top 16 team.

== Career ==
As a cadet, Tiphaigne initially competed with the Monaco junior team. In 2020, he joined the Marmande club and finished third in the Nouvelle-Aquitaine regional junior championship.

Tiphaigne won the bronze medal in the new elimination event at the 2025 Para-cycling Track World Championships.
