= 2024 UCI Para-cycling Track World Championships =

- Venue: Rio de Janeiro, Brazil
- Date: 20–24 March
- Velodrome: Rio Olympic Velodrome
- Nations participating: 39
- Cyclists participating: 203+46
- Events: 48

The 2024 UCI Para-cycling Track World Championships was held from 20 to 24 March 2024, at the Olympic Velodrome in Rio de Janeiro, Brazil.

== Results ==
=== Men ===
Event	Class	Gold		Silver		Bronze	
Sprint	B	Great Britain; Neil Fachie; Matt Rotherham (pilot)		France; Raphael Beaugillet; Quentin Caleyron		Great Britain; Stephen Bate; Christopher Latham (pilot)	
1 km time trial	C1	Li Zhangyu; China	1:10.608	Liang Weicong; China	1:13.292	Mohamad Yusof Hafizi Shaharuddin; Malaysia	1:15.572
1 km time trial	C2	Alexandre Léauté; France	1:08.358; WR	Gordon Allan; Australia	1:10.784	Shota Kawamoto; Japan	1:11.429
1 km time trial	C3	Devon Briggs; New Zealand	1:05.259; WR	Jaco van Gass; Great Britain	1:06.317	Finlay Graham; Great Britain	1:07.278
1 km time trial	C4	Jody Cundy; Great Britain	1:04.120	Korey Boddington; Australia	1:04.699	Michael Shippley; Australia	1:05.540
1 km time trial	C5	Blaine Hunt; Great Britain	1:03.475	Alfonso Cabello; Spain	1:03.823	Niels Verschaeren; Belgium	1:04.980
1 km time trial	B	Great Britain; Neil Fachie; Matt Rotherham (pilot)	1:00.343	Great Britain; James Ball; Steffan Lloyd (pilot)	1:00.448	Germany; Thomas Ulbricht; Robert Förstemann (pilot)	1:01.752
Individual pursuit	C1	Li Zhangyu; China	3:46.030^{G}	Liang Weicong; China	3:56.109^{G}	Aaron Keith; United States	3:48.826^{B}
Individual pursuit	C2	Alexandre Léauté; France		Ewoud Vromant; Belgium	OVL	Shota Kawamoto; Japan	3:35.986^{B}
Individual pursuit	C3	Jaco van Gass; Great Britain	3:24.774^{G}	Finlay Graham; Great Britain	3:36.031^{G}	Devon Briggs; New Zealand	3:28.616^{B}
Individual pursuit	C4	Archie Atkinson; Great Britain		Kévin Le Cunff; France	OVL	Gatien Le Rousseau; France	4:31.592^{B}
Individual pursuit	C5	Dorian Foulon; France		Lauro Chaman; Brazil	OVL	Franz-Josef Lässer; Austria	4:28.488^{B}
Individual pursuit	B	Netherlands; Tristan Bangma; Patrick Bos (pilot)	3:58.397^{G} WR	Great Britain; Stephen Bate; Christopher Latham (pilot)	4:02.479^{G}	Italy; Lorenzo Bernard; Davide Plebani (pilot)	4:08.117^{B}
Scratch race	C1	Liang Weicong; China		Ricardo Ten Argilés; Spain		Pierre Senska; Germany	
Scratch race	C2	Alexandre Léauté; France		Shota Kawamoto; Japan		Ewoud Vromant; Belgium	
Scratch race	C3	Jaco Van Gass; Great Britain		Alexandre Hayward; Canada		Masaki Fujita; Japan	
Scratch race	C4	Kévin Le Cunff; France		Gatien Le Rousseau; France		Bryan Larsen; United States	
Scratch race	C5	Dorian Foulon; France		Franz-Josef Lässer; Austria		Alistair Donohoe; Australia	
Omnium	C1	Liang Weicong; China	154 pts	Li Zhangyu; China	154 pts	Ricardo Ten Argilés; Spain	142 pts
Omnium	C2	Alexandre Léauté; France	160 pts	Shota Kawamoto; Japan	150 pts	Matthew Robertson; Great Britain	138 pts
Omnium	C3	Jaco van Gass; Great Britain	156 pts	Devon Briggs; New Zealand	148 pts	Finlay Graham; Great Britain	140 pts
Omnium	C4	Gatien Le Rousseau; France	140 pts	Kévin Le Cunff; France	136 pts	Bryan Larsen; United States	132 pts
Omnium	C5	Dorian Foulon; France	146 pts	Franz-Josef Lässer; Austria	138 pts	Blaine Hunt; Great Britain	128 pts

=== Women ===
Event	Class	Gold		Silver		Bronze	
Sprint	B	Great Britain; Elizabeth Jordan; Dannielle Khan (pilot)		Great Britain; Sophie Unwin; Jenny Holl (pilot)		Australia; Jessica Gallagher; Caitlin Ward (pilot)	
500 m time trial	C1	Qian Wangwei; China	41.249	Katie Toft; Great Britain	48.348	—N/a	
500 m time trial	C2	Amanda Reid; Australia	39.041	Sabrina Custódia da Silva; Brazil	43.674	Flurina Rigling; Switzerland	43.866
500 m time trial	C3	Wang Xiaomei; China	39.480	Mel Pemble; Canada	39.573	Aniek van den Aarssen; Netherlands	39.659
500 m time trial	C4	Kadeena Cox; Great Britain	36.675	Anna Taylor; New Zealand	38.558	Li Xiaohui; China	38.605
500 m time trial	C5	Caroline Groot; Netherlands	36.312	Marie Patouillet; France	37.535	Nicole Murray; New Zealand	36.068
1 km time trial	B	Great Britain; Elizabeth Jordan; Dannielle Khan (pilot)	1:07.463	Great Britain; Sophie Unwin; Jenny Holl (pilot)	1:07.978	Australia; Jessica Gallagher; Caitlin Ward (pilot)	1:08.192
Individual pursuit	C1	Qian Wangwei; China		Katie Toft; Great Britain	OVL	—N/a	
Individual pursuit	C2	Daphne Schrager; Great Britain	3:57.802^{G}	Flurina Rigling; Switzerland	3:58.134^{G}	Daniela Munévar; Colombia	4:20.822^{B}
Individual pursuit	C3	Wang Xiaomei; China	3:58.254^{G}	Keiko Sugiura; Japan	4:01.067^{G}	Aniek van den Aarssen; Netherlands	4:04.621^{B}
Individual pursuit	C4	Emily Petricola; Australia	3:46.317^{G}	Samantha Bosco; United States	3:54.007^{G}	Keely Shaw; Canada	3:54.093^{B}
Individual pursuit	C5	Heïdi Gaugain; France	3:43.687^{G}	Nicole Murray; New Zealand	3:45.982^{G}	Claudia Cretti; Italy	3:46.535^{B}
Individual pursuit	B	Great Britain; Elizabeth Jordan; Dannielle Khan (pilot)	3:23.686^{G}	Great Britain; Sophie Unwin; Jenny Holl (pilot)	3:24.977^{G}	Poland; Otylia Marczuk; Ewa Bańkowska (pilot)	3:26.024^{B}
Scratch race	C1	Qian Wangwei; China		Katie Toft; Great Britain		—N/a	
Scratch race	C2	Amanda Reid; Australia		Flurina Rigling; Switzerland		Christelle Ribault; France	
Scratch race	C3	Wang Xiaomei; China		Paula Caballeros; Colombia		Aniek van den Aarssen; Netherlands	
Scratch race	C4	Li Xiaohui; China		Emily Petricola; Australia		Franziska Matile-Dörig; Switzerland	
Scratch race	C5	Marie Patouillet; France		Claudia Cretti; Italy		Nicole Murray; New Zealand	
Omnium	C1	Qian Wangwei; China	160 pts	Katie Toft; Great Britain	152 pts	—N/a	
Omnium	C2	Flurina Rigling; Switzerland	156 pts	Daphne Schrager; Great Britain	148 pts	Daniela Munévar; Colombia	140 pts
Omnium	C3	Wang Xiaomei; China	160 pts	Aniek van den Aarssen; Netherlands	146 pts	Mel Pemble; Canada	138 pts
Omnium	C4	Emily Petricola; Australia	142 pts	Li Xiaohui; China	138 pts	Anna Taylor; New Zealand	138 pts
Omnium	C5	Marie Patouillet; France	150 pts	Nicole Murray; New Zealand	146 pts	Claudia Cretti; Italy	136 pts

=== Mixed ===
Event	Class	Gold		Silver		Bronze	
Team sprint	B	Italy; Chiara Colombo; Elena Bissolati (pilot); Stefano Meroni; Francesco Ceci (pilot)	50.122^{G}	Great Britain; Lora Fachie; Corrine Hall (pilot); Neil Fachie; Matt Rotherham (pilot)	50.497^{G}	United States; Hannah Chadwick; Skyler Espinoza (pilot); Michael Stephens; Joe Christiansen (pilot)	51.437^{B}
Team sprint	C1–5	China; Li Zhangyu; Wu Guoqing; Lai Shanzhang	47.939^{G}	Great Britain; Kadeena Cox; Jaco van Gass; Blaine Hunt	48.634^{G}	Australia; Gordon Allan; Michael Shippley; Korey Boddington	49.227^{B}

== Medal table ==
China topped the medal table with fourteen golds, but by the barest of margins from Great Britain (thirteen) and France (twelve). Great Britain's far higher silver medal count proving decisive as their 32 medals comfortably led the overall medals tally. Of the other nations to take part, only Australia with four and Netherlands with two got more than one gold medal, although Australia did reach double figures in medals overall, the only nation outside the 'Big three' to do so.

* Host nation (Brazil)

Rank	Nation	Gold	Silver	Bronze	Total
1	China	14	4	1	19
2	Great Britain	13	14	5	32
3	France	12	5	2	19
4	Australia	4	3	5	12
5	Netherlands	2	1	3	6
6	New Zealand	1	4	4	9
7	Switzerland	1	2	2	5
8	Italy	1	1	3	5
9	Japan	0	3	3	6
10	Canada	0	2	2	4
11	Austria	0	2	1	3
11	Spain	0	2	1	3
13	Brazil*	0	2	0	2
14	United States	0	1	4	5
15	Belgium	0	1	2	3
15	Colombia	0	1	2	3
17	Germany	0	0	2	2
18	Malaysia	0	0	1	1
18	Poland	0	0	1	1
Totals (19 entries)		48	48	44	140
