= Maxwell Sudholz =

Australian para-cyclist

Personal information
- Nationality: Australian
- Born: 29 April 1999 (age 27)

Sport
- Sport: Para-cycling
- Disability class: C3
- Club: Vikings Cycling Club
Medal record
Men's para-cycling
Representing Australia
Track World Championships
| Gold medal – first place | 2026 Apeldoorn | Mixed team sprint C1–5 |
| Silver medal – second place | 2026 Apeldoorn | Sprint C3 |
| Silver medal – second place | 2026 Apeldoorn | Time trial C3 |

Maxwell Sudholz (born 29 April 1999) is an Australian para-cyclist.

== Career ==
In October 2026, he was selected to compete at the 2026 UCI Para-cycling Track World Championships. He won a silver medal in the sprint C3 event in his Track World Championships debut. He also won a silver medal in the 1 km time trial C3 event. On the final day of the competition he won a gold medal in the mixed team sprint C1–5 event, along with Caitlin Ward and Korey Boddington.
