= Tifany Huot-Marchand =

French speed skater (born 1994)

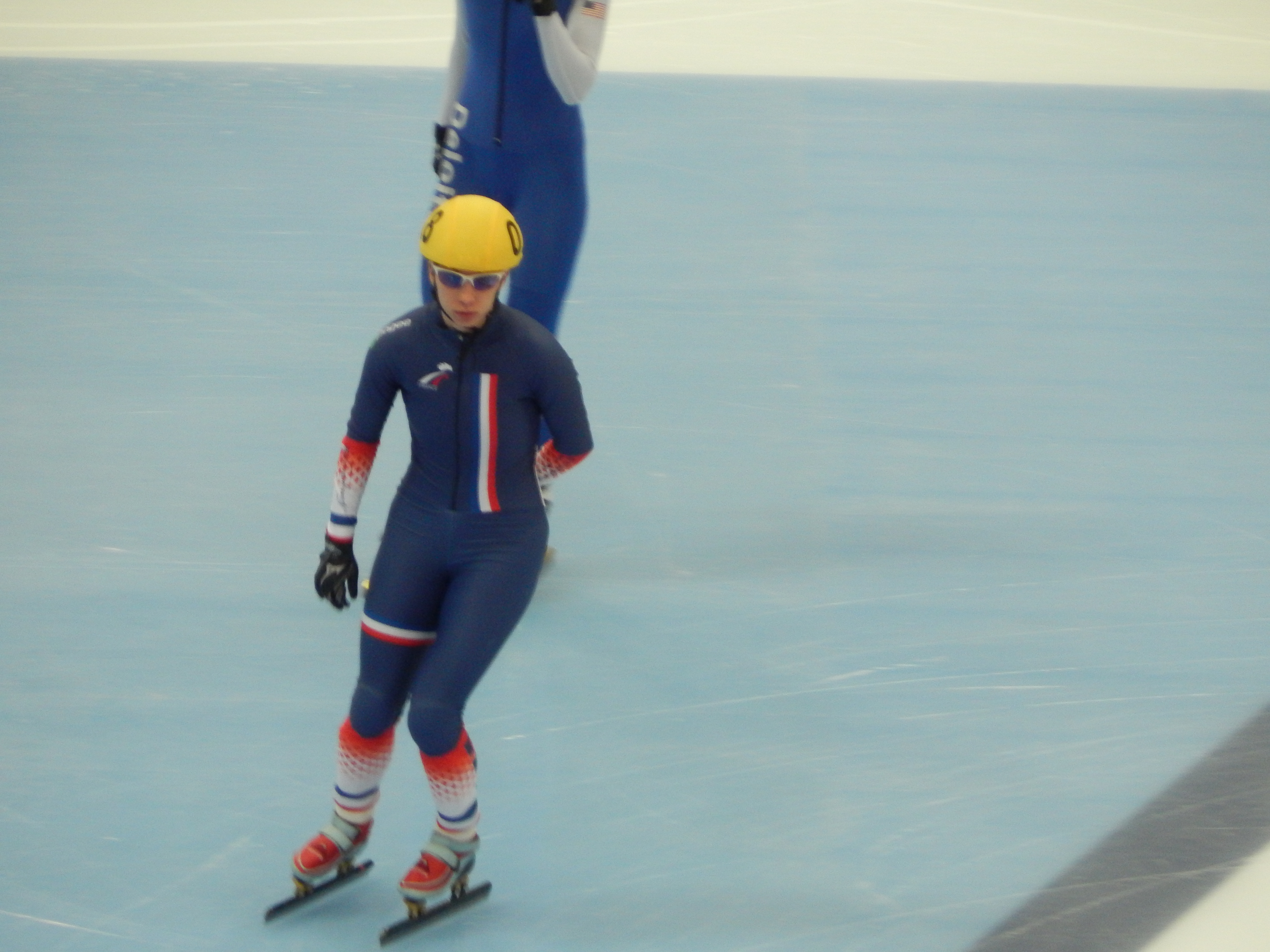
- Huot-Marchand in 2015

Personal information
- Nationality: French
- Born: 10 May 1994 (age 32) Besançon, France
- Height: 1.63 m (5 ft 4 in)
- Weight: 51 kg (112 lb)

Sport
- Country: France
- Sport: Short track speed skating
- Club: ASM Belfort Vitesse
Medal record
Representing France
Women's short track speed skating
World Championships
Silver medal – second place	2021 Dordrecht	3000 m relay
European Championships
Gold medal – first place	2021 Gdańsk	3000 m relay
Silver medal – second place	2019 Dordrecht	1000 m
Bronze medal – third place	2018 Dresden	3000 m relay
Women's para-cycling
Track World Championships
Gold medal – first place	2026 Apeldoorn	Scratch race C3
Gold medal – first place	2026 Apeldoorn	Elimination C3
Gold medal – first place	2026 Apeldoorn	Sprint C3

Tifany Huot-Marchand (born 10 May 1994) is a French para-cyclist and former short track speed skater.

== Career ==
She competed in the women's 500 metres at the 2018 Winter Olympics.

In October 2022, she suffered a C5 cervical fracture and damaged her spinal cord after she crashed while competing at the speed skating World Cup event in Heerenveen, Netherlands, and left her paralyzed. Following her accident she then transitioned to para-cycling.
