= Marie Quellhorst =

German para-cyclist (born 1998)

- Marie Quellhorst (2026)

Personal information
- Nationality: German
- Born: 14 November 1998 (age 27) Minden, Germany

Sport
- Sport: Para-cycling
- Disability class: C3
Medal record
Women's Para-cycling
Representing Germany
Road World Championships
Silver medal – second place	2025 Ronse	Time trial C3
Track World Championships
Silver medal – second place	2026 Apeldoorn	Elimination C3
Silver medal – second place	2026 Apeldoorn	Sprint C3
Bronze medal – third place	2026 Apeldoorn	Scratch race C3

Marie Quellhorst (born 14 November 1998) is a German para-cyclist.

== Career ==
In August 2025, Quellhorst represented Germany at the 2025 UCI Para-cycling Road World Championships and won a silver medal in the time trial C3 event.
