= Heather Jameson =

Irish para-athlete (born 1997)

- Jameson at the 2026 UCI Para Cycling Track World Championships

Personal information
- Born: 20 May 1997 (age 29) Garristown, County Dublin, Ireland

Sport
- Country: Ireland
- Sport: Athletics, CP football, cycling
- Events: Sprint, long jump
Medal record
Representing Ireland
Women's para-cycling
Track World Championships
Silver medal – second place	2026 Apeldoorn	Time trial C2
Bronze medal – third place	2026 Apeldoorn	Sprint C2
Road World Championships
Silver medal – second place	2026 Huntsville	Road race C2
Road European Championships
Bronze medal – third place	2026 Maniago	Road race C2
Bronze medal – third place	2026 Maniago	Time trial C2
Women's CP football
Women's World Cup
Bronze medal – third place	2024 Salou	Team

Heather Jameson (born 20 May 1997) is an Irish para-athlete who has competed in para-athletics, CP football and para-cycling. In para-athletics, she competed in 100 metres, 200 metres and long jump events in the T37 category. In CP football, she has represented the Ireland national team. As a cyclist, she competes in the C2 category and has won medals at the Road European, World Championships and Track World Championships.

== Career ==
=== Athletics ===
Jameson made her Paralympic debut at the 2012 Summer Paralympics, where she competed in the long jump, 100 metres, and 200 metres. She was awarded the Rehab People of the Year Award as part of the 2012 Irish Paralympic Team, for her inspiring sporting achievements at London 2012. Injuries prevented her from qualifying for the 2016 Summer Paralympics and she retired from athletics in 2017.

=== CP football ===
After retiring from athletics, Jameson decided to turn to CP football. In May 2019, she was playing for the Ireland CP Football Development Academy at the Dublin Tournament, where she named Player of the Tournament. She was playing with Ashbourne United in 2022 when the team won the treble. With her role in the FAI, Heather Jameson founded the Ireland Women Cerebral Palsy international Football Team and the under 14's CP junior girls set up. In 2024, Jameson was named the first captain of the Ireland national team. She was part of that squad that went on to win the bronze medal at the 2024 IFCPF Women's World Cup. Jameson was top goal scorer with 16 goals and won Most Valuable Player (MVP) award at the tournament.

=== Cycling ===
In June 2026, Jameson was selected by Cycling Ireland to competed in her first Road European Championships held in Maniago, Italy. She competed in the time trial and in the road race, where she won a bronze medal in both events. The following month, she was named to the Irish team for the Road World Championships held in Huntsville, Alabama, U.S. At the aforementioned World Championships, she competed in the time trial and road race, winning the silver medal in the latter.

At the 2026 UCI Para Cycling Track World Championships, Jameson made her track debut and won a silver metal in the time trial and a bronze medal in the sprint race.

== Personal life ==
As of 2022, Jameson has a domestic life partner named Claire McGann.
