= Aniek van den Aarssen =

Dutch para-cyclist (born 1997)

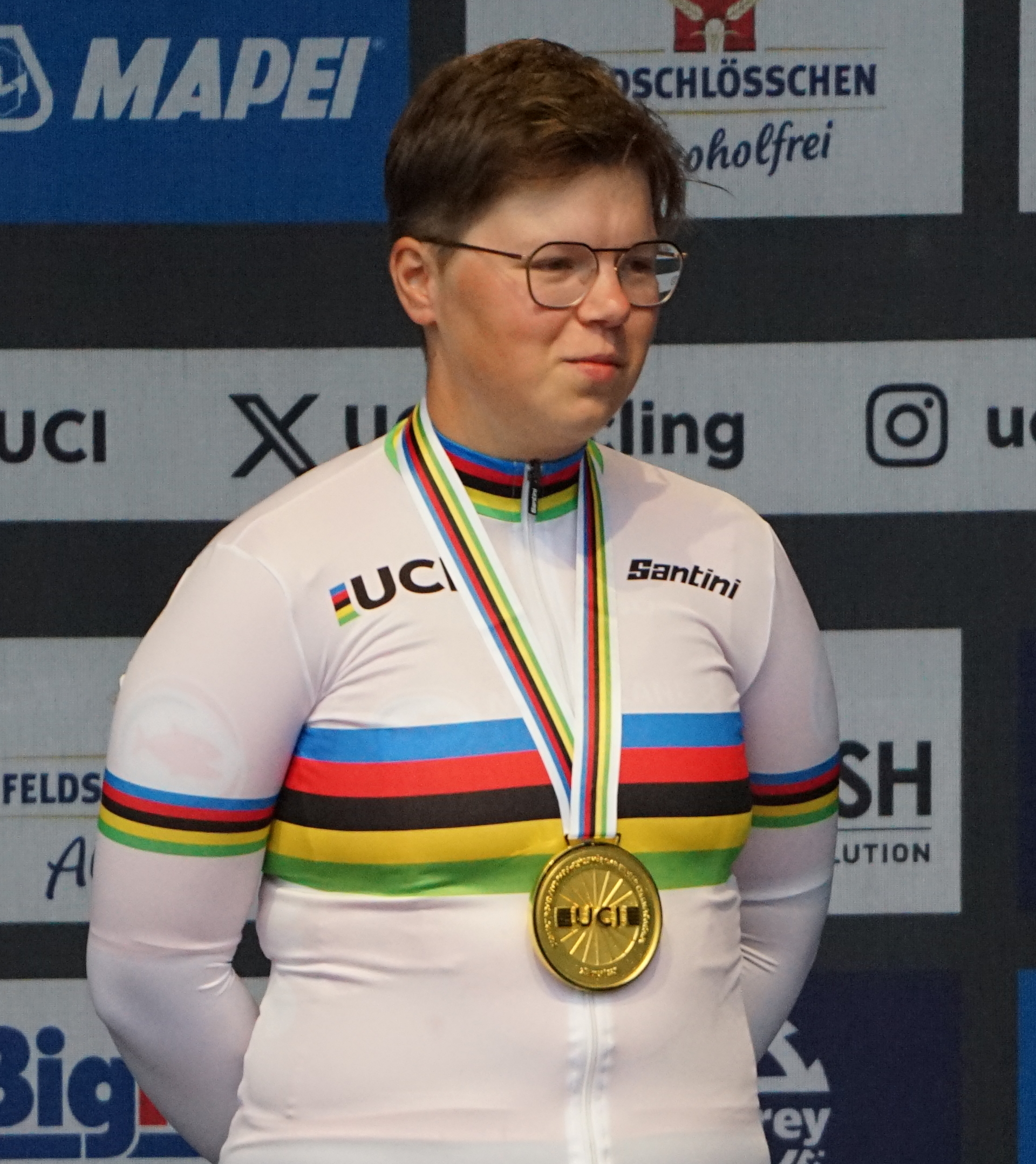
- van den Aarssen at the 2024 World Championships

Personal information
- Born: 7 February 1997 (age 29)

Cycling career
- Sport: Cycling
- Disciplines: Road; Track
- Role: Rider
Medal record
Women's para-cycling
Representing Netherlands
Track World Championships
Gold medal – first place	2022 Saint-Quentin-en-Yvelines	Time trial C3
Gold medal – first place	2026 Apeldoorn	Time trial C3
Silver medal – second place	2022 Saint-Quentin-en-Yvelines	Scratch race C1
Silver medal – second place	2022 Saint-Quentin-en-Yvelines	Ominum C1
Silver medal – second place	2023 Glasgow	Time trial C3
Silver medal – second place	2023 Glasgow	Individual pursuit C3
Silver medal – second place	2023 Glasgow	Scratch race C3
Silver medal – second place	2023 Glasgow	Ominum C3
Silver medal – second place	2024 Rio de Janeiro	Omnium C3
Silver medal – second place	2025 Rio de Janeiro	Sprint C3
Bronze medal – third place	2024 Rio de Janeiro	Time trial C3
Bronze medal – third place	2024 Rio de Janeiro	Individual pursuit C3
Bronze medal – third place	2024 Rio de Janeiro	Scratch race C3
Bronze medal – third place	2025 Rio de Janeiro	Time trial C3
Road World Championships
Gold medal – first place	2024 Zurich	Road race C3
European Championships
Silver medal – second place	2023 Rotterdam	Time trial C3
Silver medal – second place	2023 Rotterdam	Road race C3

Aniek van den Aarssen (born 7 February 1997) is a Dutch para-cyclist who competes in road and track events for Cycle Capital Cycling Club.

== Career ==
In October 2022, van den Aarssen competed in the 2022 UCI Para-cycling Track World Championships. Competing in the C3 classification, she won the gold medal in the time trial event. She also won the silver medal in the scratch race and omnium. Van den Aarssen competed in the 2023 Track World Championships in August, winning the silver medal in the time trial, individual pursuit and omnium events. Also in the same month, she competed in the European Para Championships in the time trial and road race, winning the silver medal in both events, with Antonella Incristi finishing ahead of her.

At the 2024 Track World Championships, van den Aarssen won the silver medal in the omnium. She also won the bronze medal in the time trial, individual pursuit and scratch race. In September, at the Road World Championships, she won the road race in the C3 classification.
