= Lara Wolleschensky =

German para-cyclist (born 1997)

Personal information
- Born: 29 March 1997 (age 29) Apolda, Thuringia, Germany

Cycling career
- Sport: Cycling
- Disciplines: Road, track
- Role: Rider
Medal record
Representing Germany
Women's para-cycling
Track World Championships
Bronze medal – third place	2026 Apeldoorn	Elimination C3

Lara Wolleschensky (born 29 March 1997) is an German para-cyclist who competes in the C3 category.

== Early life ==
Wolleschensky had suffered a stroke at childbirth, and as a result, she had trouble walking, balancing, and using her left hand. She learned to ride a bicycle at a young age, which was beneficial, because it allows her to use both sides of the body equally and practice her sense of balance. When she was 15, she was also diagnosed with multiple sclerosis.

== Career ==
In 2018, Wolleschensky came into contact with the "Besi & Friends" Foundation, which supports people with autoimmune and neurological diseases. The foundation's chairman Andreas Beseler, encouraged her to continue cycling a lot.

In 2023, Wolleschensky competed in the Styrkeprøven. In August 2025, at the Road World Championships, she finished in eighth place in the time trial. In 2026, she finished in second place at the German Road Championships in her category. In October 2026, she also competed at the Track World Championships, where she won a bronze medal in the elimination race.
