= Biancalana =

Biancalana is a surname. Notable people with the surname include:

- Buddy Biancalana (born 1960), American baseball player
- Mario Biancalana (1902–1990), Brazilian fencer

== See also ==
- Biancalani
