= Nuraini Muhamad Shukri =

Malaysian para-cyclist (born 1995)

- Nuraini Muhamad Shukri (2026)

Personal information
- Full name: Nuraini binti Muhamad Shukri
- Nationality: Malaysian
- Born: 20 August 1995 (age 31)

Sport
- Sport: Para-cycling
- Disability class: C1
Medal record
Women's Para-cycling
Representing Malaysia
Track World Championships
Bronze medal – third place	2026 Apeldoorn	Sprint C1
Bronze medal – third place	2026 Apeldoorn	Time trial C1
Road World Championships
Bronze medal – third place	2025 Ronse	Time trial C1
Asian Para Road Championships
Gold medal – first place	2025 Phitsanulok	Time trial C1
Gold medal – first place	2025 Phitsanulok	Road race C1

Nuraini binti Muhamad Shukri (born 20 August 1995) is a Malaysian para-cyclist.

== Career ==
In February 2025, Nuraini represented Malaysia at the 2025 Asian Road Cycling Championships and won gold medals in both time trial C1 event and road race C1 events.

In August 2025, Nuraini represented Malaysia at the 2025 UCI Para-cycling Road World Championships and won a bronze medal in the time trial C1 event, with a time of 26:07.99. She became the first Malaysian woman to medal at the Road World Championships.

Besides cycling, Nuraini also participated in Para-athletics track events. Representing the state of Perak, she won 1 gold and 1 silver in the 200m T36 and 100m T36 respectively at the 2024 Para Sukma Games.
