= Anne Martha Blok =

Dutch para-cyclist (born 1998)

- Anne Martha Blok (2026)

Personal information
- Nationality: Dutch
- Born: 1 March 1998 (age 28)

Sport
- Sport: Para-cycling
- Disability class: C3
Medal record
Women's para-cycling
Representing Netherlands
Track World Championships
Bronze medal – third place	2026 Apeldoorn	1 km time trial C3

Anne Martha Blok (born 1 March 1998) is a Dutch para-cyclist and para-triathlete.

== Career ==
In July 2026, Blok became the Dutch national paratriathlon champion. In October 2026, she competed at the 2026 UCI Para-cycling Track World Championships and won a bronze medal in the 1 km time trial C3 event.

== Personal life ==
Blok was born without her right arm and with a partial left arm.
