= Jorn Van Loon =

Belgian para-cyclist (born 1994)

- Jorn van Loon (2026)

Personal information
- Nationality: Belgian
- Born: 21 September 1994 (age 32)

Sport
- Sport: Para-cycling
- Disability class: C5
Medal record
Men's para-cycling
Representing Belgium
Track World Championships
Bronze medal – third place	2026 Apeldoorn	Sprint C5

Jorn Van Loon (born 21 September 1994) is a Belgian para-cyclist.

== Career ==
In October 2026, Van Loon was selected to compete at the 2026 UCI Para-cycling Track World Championships where he made his Track World Championships debut. He won a bronze medal in the sprint C5 event. He also finished in fifth place in the 1 km time trial C5 event.

== Personal life ==
In 2020, Van Loon suffered a severe motorcycle accident that resulted in fractures and limited mobility to his left foot.
