= Nicolas Dalla Valle =

Italian cyclist

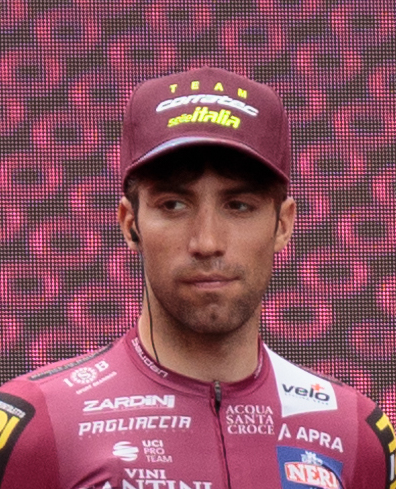
- Dalla Valle at the 2023 Giro d'Italia

Personal information
- Full name: Nicolas Dalla Valle
- Born: 13 September 1997 (age 29) Padua, Italy
- Weight: 73 kg (161 lb)

Cycling career
- Sport: Cycling
- Discipline: Road
- Role: Rider

Amateur teams
- 2016–2018: Team Colpack
- 2019: UAE Team Emirates (stagiaire)

Professional teams
- 2019: Tirol KTM Cycling Team
- 2020–2021: Bardiani–CSF–Faizanè
- 2022: Giotti Victoria–Savini Due
- 2023: Team Corratec

Nicolas Dalla Valle (born 13 September 1997) is an Italian racing cyclist, who most recently rode for UCI ProTeam Team Corratec–Selle Italia.

== Major results ==
2015
1st Mountains classification, Trophée Centre Morbihan
3rd La Piccola San Remo
5th GP dell'Arno
2018
3rd La Popolarissima
2019
2nd Road race, National Under-23 Road Championships
10th GP Adria Mobil
2022
Tour of Szeklerland

1st Points classification
1st Stages 1 & 5

3rd Grand Prix Megasaray
9th Overall Tour of Romania
10th Grand Prix Justiniano Hotels
2023 (1 pro win)
1st Stage 4 Tour of Hainan
3rd Circuito del Porto
4th Poreč Trophy
7th Umag Trophy

=== Grand Tour general classification results timeline ===
Grand Tour	2023
Giro d'Italia	125
Tour de France	—
Vuelta a España	—

Legend
—	Did not compete
DNF	Did not finish
