= Niels Verschaeren =

Austrian para-cyclist (born 1991)

- Niels Verschaeren (2026)

Personal information
- Born: 31 July 1991 (age 35)

Sport
- Sport: Para-cycling
- Disability: Agenesis
- Disability class: C5
Medal record
Men's para-cycling
Representing Belgium
Track World Championships
Gold medal – first place	2025 Rio de Janeiro	Sprint C5
Silver medal – second place	2026 Apeldoorn	Sprint C5
Silver medal – second place	2026 Apeldoorn	1 km time trial C5
Bronze medal – third place	2023 Glasgow	1 km time trial C5
Bronze medal – third place	2024 Rio de Janeiro	1 km time trial C5

Niels Verschaeren (born 31 July 1991) is a Belgian para-cyclist who competes in road and track events.

== Career ==
Verschaeren competed at the 2023 UCI Para-cycling Track World Championships and won a bronze medal in the 1 km time trial C5 event with a time of 1:05.346. He competed at the 2024 UCI Para-cycling Track World Championships and again won a bronze medal in the 1 km time trial C5 event with a time of 1:04.980. He competed at the 2025 UCI Para-cycling Track World Championships and won a gold medal in the sprint C5 event.

== Personal life ==
Verschaeren has agenesis, and was born without a left hand.
