= Daphne Schrager =

British para-cyclist (born 2000)

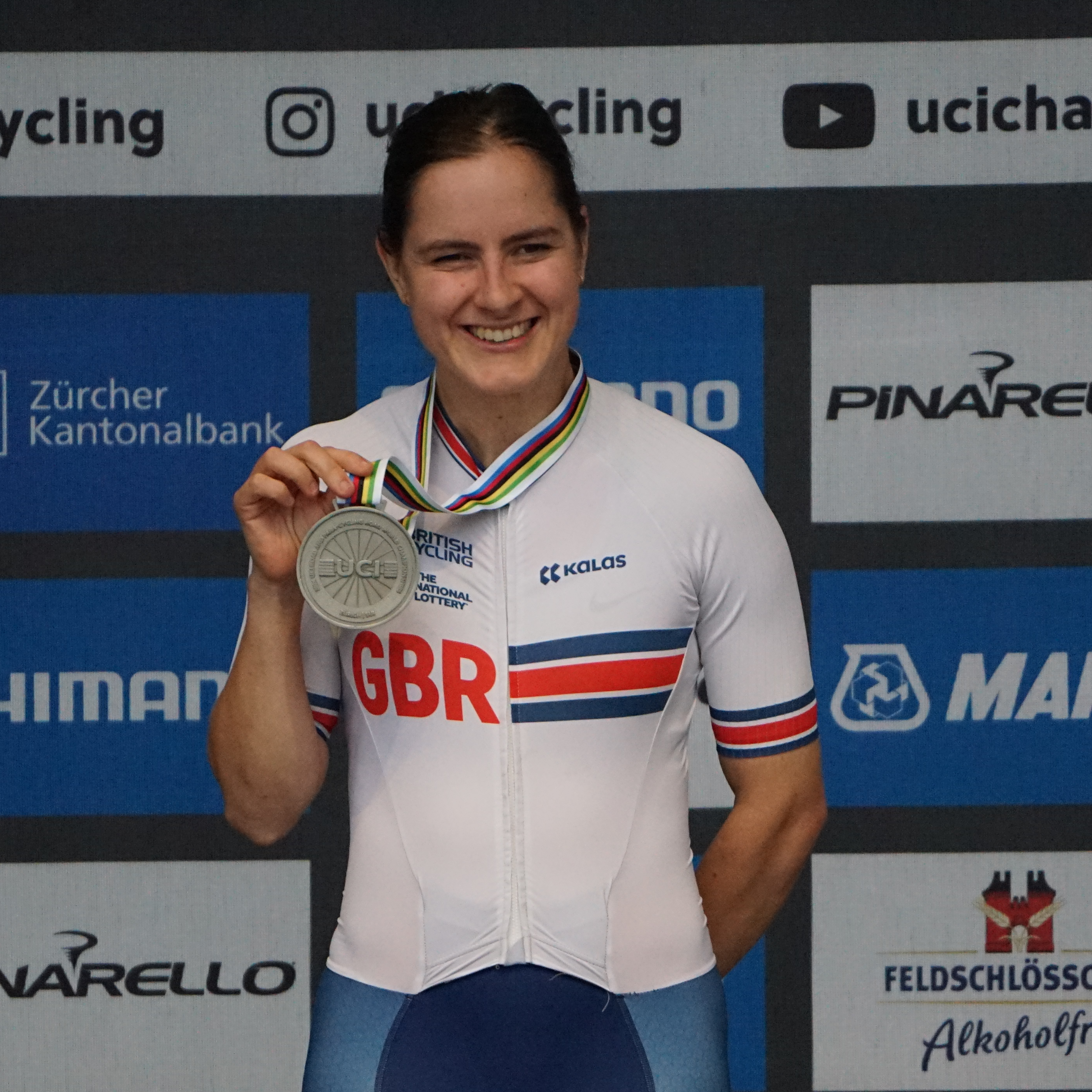
- Schrager during the 2024 Road World Championships

Personal information
- Born: 24 December 2000 (age 25) Malmesbury, U.K.

Sport
- Sport: Para-cycling
- Disability: Cerebral palsy
- Disability class: C2
Medal record
Women's para-cycling
Representing Great Britain
Paralympic Games
Silver medal – second place	2024 Paris	Pursuit C1–3
Track World Championships
Gold medal – first place	2022 Saint-Quentin-en-Yvelines	Individual pursuit C3
Gold medal – first place	2024 Rio de Janeiro	Individual pursuit C2
Silver medal – second place	2023 Glasgow	Individual pursuit C2
Silver medal – second place	2024 Rio de Janeiro	Omnium C2
Road World Championships
Silver medal – second place	2024 Zurich	Time trial C2
Silver medal – second place	2024 Zurich	Road race C2
Bronze medal – third place	2021 Cascais	Road race C3

Daphne Schrager (born 24 December 2000) is a British para-cyclist. She won a silver medal representing Great Britain at the 2024 Summer Paralympics.

== Career ==
Schrager began her career as a para-athlete competing in sprints, and made her international debut for England at the 2018 Commonwealth Games. She joined Great Britain's cycling program in December 2019.

She made her UCI Para-cycling Track World Championships debut for Great Britain in 2022 and won a gold medal in the individual pursuit event. She again represented Great Britain at the 2023 UCI Para-cycling Track World Championships and won a silver medal in the individual pursuit event.

She represented Great Britain at the 2024 UCI Para-cycling Track World Championships and won a gold medal in the individual pursuit, and a silver medal in the omnium events. She represented Great Britain at the 2024 Summer Paralympics and won a silver medal in the individual pursuit C1–3 event.

In July 2026, Schrager was given a two-year ban backdated to the commencement of her provisional suspension in June 2025 for an anti-doping rule violation relating to unintentional use of Ligandrol.

== Personal life ==
Schrager has cerebral palsy.

She attended Millfield.
