= Lena Lutz =

Swiss ice hockey player (born 2001)

- Born: 12 July 2001 (age 25) Buchs, Aargau, Switzerland
- Height: 168 cm (5 ft 6 in)
- Weight: 68 kg (150 lb; 10 st 10 lb)
- Position: Forward
- Shot: Left
- Played for: HC Ambrì-Piotta; Ladies Team Lugano; HT Thurgau; EV Bomo Thun; SC Reinach; EV Zug
- National team: Switzerland
- Playing career: 2013–2026
Medal record
Olympic Games
Bronze medal – third place	2026 Milano Cortina	Team

Lena Marie Lutz (born 12 July 2001) is a former Swiss ice hockey player. She represented the Switzerland at the 2022 and 2026 Winter Olympics.

== Career ==
In July 2026, Lutz announced her retirement from ice hockey.

== International play ==
As a junior player with the Swiss national under-18 team, Lutz participated in the IIHF U18 Women's World Championships in 2017, 2018, and served as team captain in 2019.

Lutz represented Switzerland in the women's ice hockey tournament at the 2022 Winter Olympics in Beijing and at the IIHF Women's World Championship in 2021, 2022, and 2023.

She won an Olympic bronze medal in the women's ice hockey tournament at the 2026 Winter Olympics.

== Personal life ==
Lutz's younger brother, Quirin Lutz, is a para-cyclist.
