= Szymon Rekita =

Polish cyclist

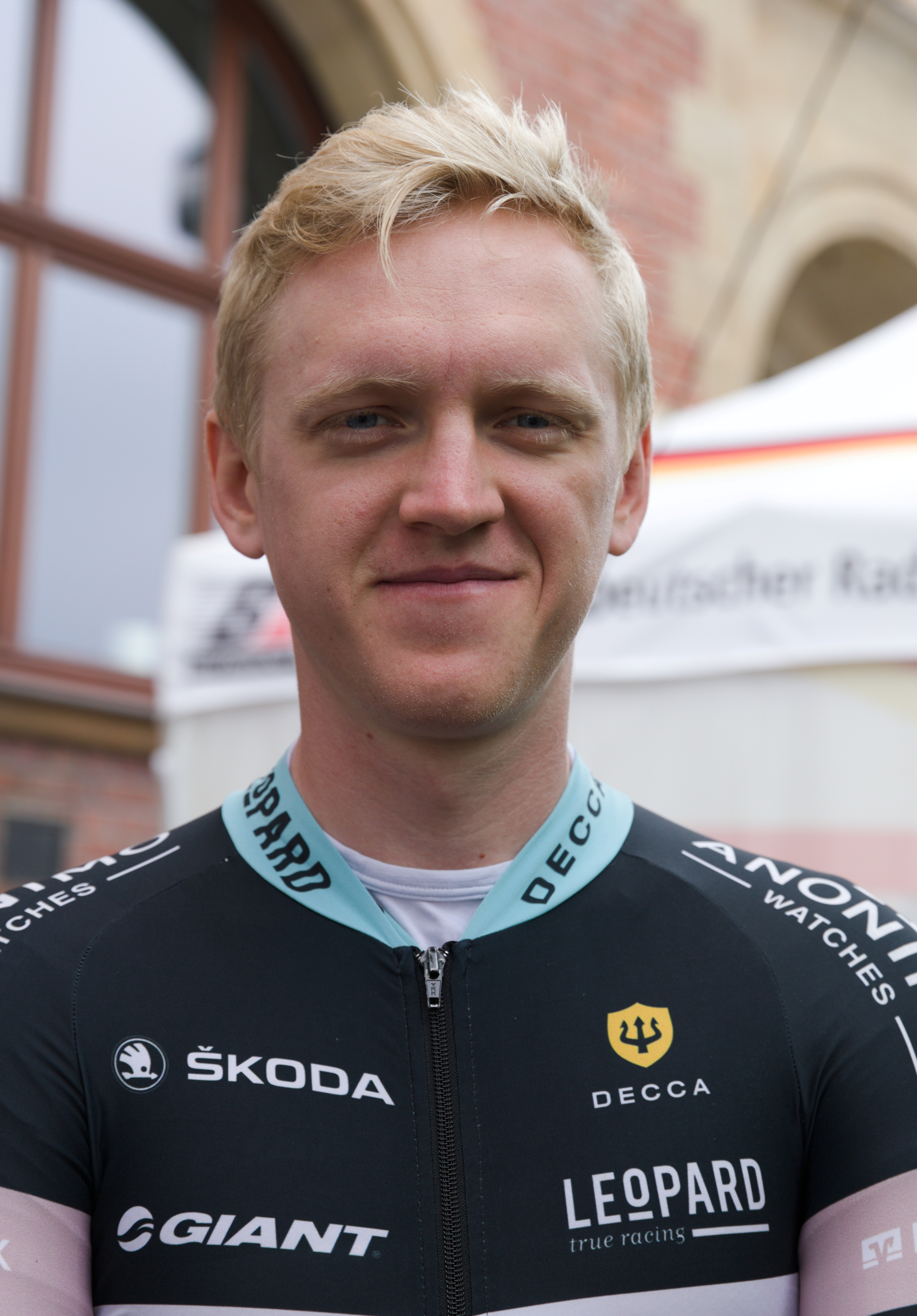
- Rekita in 2018

Personal information
- Full name: Szymon Rekita
- Born: 5 January 1994 (age 32) Biskupiec, Poland
- Height: 1.82 m (6 ft 0 in)
- Weight: 70 kg (154 lb)

Cycling career
- Sport: Cycling
- Current team: Voster Team
- Discipline: Road
- Role: Rider

Amateur teams
- 2013: Sestese Cykle Klub
- 2014–2015: GFDD Altopack ASD
- 2015: Trek Factory Racing (stagiaire)
- 2016: Alppack–Eppela VC Coppi Lunata

Professional teams
- 2017–2020: Leopard Pro Cycling
- 2021–: Voster ATS Team

Szymon Rekita (born 5 January 1994) is a Polish cyclist, who currently rides for UCI Continental team Voster Team.

== Major results ==
2012
1st Time trial, National Junior Road Championships
6th Time trial, UEC European Junior Road Championships
2013
3rd Time trial, National Under-23 Road Championships
2014
1st Time trial, National Under-23 Road Championships
10th Overall Carpathian Couriers Race
2015
1st Time trial, National Under-23 Road Championships
2016
4th Coppa Città di Offida
7th Time trial, UEC European Under-23 Road Championships
9th Overall Tour of Hainan
2017
4th Overall Tour of Rhodes

1st Stage 2

2018
4th Circuit de Wallonie
5th Time trial, National Road Championships
9th Overall Tour du Jura

1st Stage 1

9th Overall Tour of Antalya
10th Overall Tour Alsace
2019
1st Overall Tour of Antalya

1st Stage 3

5th Overall Tour de Luxembourg
7th Overall Circuit des Ardennes
8th Overall Tour de Normandie
2021
3rd Overall Szlakiem Grodów Piastowskich
3rd Overall Tour of Romania
4th Time trial, National Road Championships
2022
1st Overall Tour of Szeklerland

1st Stage 2

National Road Championships

2nd Road race
3rd Time trial

5th Overall Tour of Bulgaria

1st Stages 3b & 5
