= Dorian Foulon =

French Paralympic cyclist (born 1988)

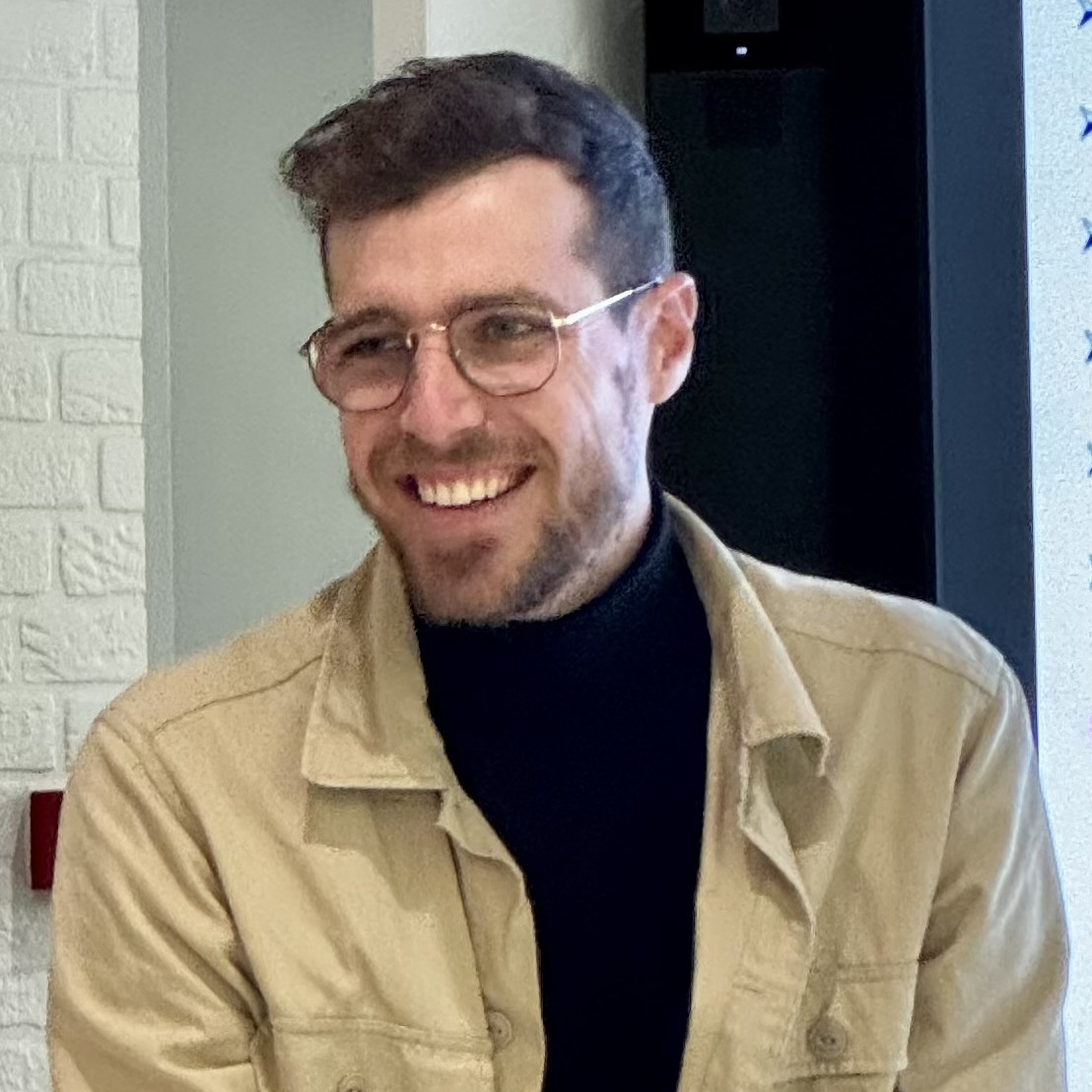
- Foulon in 2024

Personal information
- Born: 2 May 1998 (age 28) La Chapelle-Caro, France
- Height: 1.85 m (6 ft 1 in)
- Weight: 73 kg (161 lb)

Cycling career
- Sport: Cycling
- Current team: Urt Vélo 64
- Disciplines: Road; Track
- Role: Rider

Amateur teams
- 2018–2019: Entente 64
- 2019–2020: Caja Rural–Seguros RGA amateur
- 2021: Urt Vélo 64
- 2022: Occitane Cyclisme Formation
- 2023–: Urt Vélo 64
Medal record
Para-cycling
Representing France
Paralympic Games
Gold medal – first place	2020 Tokyo	Individual pursuit C5
Gold medal – first place	2024 Paris	Individual pursuit C5
Bronze medal – third place	2024 Paris	Road time trial C5
Road World Championships
Silver medal – second place	2021 Cascais	Time trial C5
Silver medal – second place	2022 Baie-Comeau	Time trial C5
Silver medal – second place	2025 Ronse	Time trial C5
Bronze medal – third place	2017 Pietermaritzburg	Road race C5
Track World Championships
Gold medal – first place	2020 Milton	Individual pursuit C5
Gold medal – first place	2020 Milton	Omnium C5
Gold medal – first place	2022 Saint-Quentin-en-Yvelines	Individual pursuit C5
Gold medal – first place	2024 Rio de Janeiro	Individual pursuit C5
Gold medal – first place	2024 Rio de Janeiro	Scratch race C5
Gold medal – first place	2024 Rio de Janeiro	Omnium C5
Silver medal – second place	2022 Saint-Quentin-en-Yvelines	Scratch race C5
Bronze medal – third place	2020 Milton	Time trial C5
Bronze medal – third place	2022 Saint-Quentin-en-Yvelines	Time trial C5
European Championships
Gold medal – first place	2023 Rotterdam	Time trial C5

Dorian Foulon (born 2 May 1998) is a French cyclist. He represented France at the 2020 and 2024 Summer Paralympics, and competes in the C5 class.

== Career ==
Foulon became the first para-cyclist to compete in the able-bodied Tour de l'Avenir.

Foulon competed in the men's individual pursuit C5 event at the 2020 Summer Paralympics where he finished with a world record time of 4:18.274 and won a gold medal.
