= Ryan Jastrab =

American para-cyclist (born 2000)

Personal information
- Nationality: American
- Born: July 17, 2000 (age 26)

Sport
- Sport: Para-cycling
- Disability class: C4
Medal record
Men's para-cycling
Representing the United States
Track World Championships
Bronze medal – third place	2026 Apeldoorn	Scratch race C4
Bronze medal – third place	2026 Apeldoorn	Elimination C4

Ryan Jastrab (born July 17, 2000) is an American para-cyclist.

== Career ==
In June 2026, he was selected to compete at the 2026 UCI Para-cycling Road World Championships, where he made his Road World Championships debut. On October 31, 2026, he competed at the 2026 UCI Para-cycling Track World Championships and won a bronze medal in the scratch race C4 event. The next day he won a bronze medal in the elimination C4 event.

== Personal life ==
Jastrab's younger sister, Megan Jastrab, is also a cyclist.

In July 2024, he was cycling in the Salt Lake criterium when his right arm crashed into a metal barricade on the last lap, nearly severing it at the shoulder. Paramedics were able to have his arm re-attached.
