= Katherine Walker (disambiguation) =

Katherine Walker (1848–1931) was an American lighthouse keeper.

Katherine Walker may also refer to:

- Kathryn Walker (born 1943), American actress
- Catherine Walker (actor) (born 1975), Irish actor
- Catherine Walker (fashion designer) (1945–2010), London-based French fashion designer

== See also ==
- Kate Walker (disambiguation) for those known as Kate or Katie
