= Cycling at the 2024 Summer Paralympics – Men's road time trial C5 =

Men's road time trial C5 at the XVII Paralympic Games
- Venue: Clichy-sous-Bois
- Dates: 4 September
- Competitors: 13 from 12 nations
- Winning time: 35:51.79

Medalists
1st place, gold medalist(s)		Daniel Abraham	Netherlands
2nd place, silver medalist(s)		Alistair Donohoe	Australia
3rd place, bronze medalist(s)		Dorian Foulon	France

The Men's time trial C5 road cycling event at the 2024 Summer Paralympics took place on 4 September 2024, at Clichy-sous-Bois, Paris. 13 riders competed in the event.

The C5 classification is for cyclists described as follows:

C5: mild monoplegic spasticity; unilateral arm amputation (above or below elbow), etc.

== Results ==
Rank	Rider	Nationality	Class	Time	Deficit
1st place, gold medalist(s)	Daniel Abraham	Netherlands	C5	35:51.79	
2nd place, silver medalist(s)	Alistair Donohoe	Australia	C5	36:18.66	+0:26.87
3rd place, bronze medalist(s)	Dorian Foulon	France	C5	36:49.84	+0:58.05
4	Lauro Chaman	Brazil	C5	36:59.51	+1:07.72
5	Franz-Josef Laesser	Austria	C5	37:16.60	+1:24.81
6	Yehor Dementyev	Ukraine	C5	37:17.98	+1:26.19
7	Elouan Gardon	United States	C5	37:43.86	+1:52.07
8	Martin van de Pol	Netherlands	C5	37:45.98	+1:54.19
9	Zsombor Wermeser	Hungary	C5	38:42.80	+2:51.01
10	Azimbek Abdullaev	Uzbekistan	C5	41:23.64	+5:31.85
11	Blaine Hunt	Great Britain	C5	42:22.07	+6:30.28
12	Hernán Moya	Chile	C5	42:37.64	+6:45.85
	Carlos Vargas	Colombia	C5	DNF	
