= Quirin Lutz =

Swiss para-cyclist (born 2005)

- Quirin Lutz (2026)

Personal information
- Nationality: Swiss
- Born: 13 April 2005 (age 21)

Sport
- Sport: Para-cycling
- Disability: Cerebral palsy
- Disability class: C2
Medal record
Men's para-cycling
Representing Switzerland
Track World Championships
Bronze medal – third place	2026 Apeldoorn	Sprint C2
Bronze medal – third place	2026 Apeldoorn	1 km time trial C2

Quirin Lutz (born 13 April 2005) is a Swiss para-cyclist.

== Career ==
Lutz began his career playing ice hockey for ten years until he was 15. He then transitioned to para-cycling. In September 2026, he made his World Championships debut at the 2026 UCI Para-cycling Road World Championships. The next month he competed at the 2026 UCI Para-cycling Track World Championships and won a bronze medal in the sprint C2 event.

== Personal life ==
Lutz was born with cerebral palsy. His older sister, Lena Lutz, is a two-time Olympic ice hockey player.
