= Katie Walker (cyclist) =

American para-cyclist (born 1986)

- Katie Walker (2026)

Personal information
- Nationality: American
- Born: October 17, 1986 (age 40) Taiwan
- Home town: Wilmington, Ohio, U.S.

Sport
- Sport: Para-cycling
- Disability class: C5
Medal record
Women's para-cycling
Representing the United States
Track World Championships
Bronze medal – third place	2026 Apeldoorn	Sprint C5

Katie Walker (born October 17, 1986) is an American para-cyclist.

== Early life ==
Walker was born in Taiwan missing her left arm just below the elbow. She was abandoned shortly after birth and adopted at 2.5 years old. She was raised in Wilmington, Ohio, and later attended Ohio State University.

== Career ==
Walker began her career competing in para-athletics from 2013 to 2016, making her debut at the 2013 IPC Athletics World Championships. She was introduced to the velodrome in 2020 during the COVID-19 pandemicc. In 2021, she was invited to a U.S. Paralympics Cycling Virtual Talent ID Camp and made the U.S. Paralympics Cycling National Team in 2022. She made her Track World Championships debut in 2022.

In October 2026, she competed at the 2026 UCI Para-cycling Track World Championships and won a bronze medal in the sprint C5 event.
