= Li Xiaohui (cyclist) =

Chinese para-cyclist

Personal information
- Nationality: Chinese
- Born: 28 July 1992 (age 34)
- Home town: Qingdao, China

Sport
- Sport: Para-cycling
- Disability class: C4
Medal record
Women's para-cycling
Representing China
Track World Championships
| Gold medal – first place | 2023 Glasgow | Scratch C4 |
| Gold medal – first place | 2024 Rio de Janeiro | Scratch C4 |
| Silver medal – second place | 2024 Rio de Janeiro | Omnium C4 |
| Silver medal – second place | 2026 Apeldoorn | Elimination C4 |
| Bronze medal – third place | 2024 Rio de Janeiro | 500 m time trial C4 |
| Bronze medal – third place | 2026 Apeldoorn | Scratch C4 |
| Bronze medal – third place | 2026 Apeldoorn | Sprint C4 |

Li Xiaohui (born 28 July 1992) is a Chinese para-cyclist who represented China at the 2024 Summer Paralympics.

== Career ==
Li represented China at the 2023 UCI Para-cycling Track World Championships and won a gold medal in the scratch race event. She again competed at the 2024 UCI Para-cycling Track World Championships and won a gold medal in the scratch race, a silver medal in the omnium, and a bronze medal in the 500 metres time trial events.

She represented China at the 2024 Summer Paralympics.
