= Korey Boddington =

Australian Paralympic cyclist

Korey Boddington OAM

Personal information
- Full name: Korey Boddington
- Nationality: Australian
- Born: 9 September 1995 (age 31)

Sport
- Country: Australia
- Sport: Para-cycling
- Disability class: C3
- Club: University of Queensland Cycling Club
Medal record
Men's para-cycling
Representing Australia
Paralympic Games
Gold medal – first place	2024 Paris	Time trial C4–5
Bronze medal – third place	2024 Paris	Mixed team sprint C1–5
Track World Championships
Gold medal – first place	2025 Rio de Janeiro	Sprint C3
Gold medal – first place	2025 Rio de Janeiro	Time Trial C3
Gold medal – first place	2025 Rio de Janeiro	Elimination C3
Gold medal – first place	2025 Rio de Janeiro	Mixed team sprint C1–5
Gold medal – first place	2026 Apeldoorn	Time trial C4
Gold medal – first place	2026 Apeldoorn	Sprint C4
Gold medal – first place	2026 Apeldoorn	Mixed team sprint C1–5
Silver medal – second place	2024 Rio de Janeiro	Time Trial C4
Bronze medal – third place	2024 Rio de Janeiro	Mixed team sprint C1-5

Korey Boddington OAM (born 9 September 1995) is an Australian Paralympic track cyclist who broke the world record and won the gold medal in the men's C4 1,000m time trial at the 2024 Paralympic Games in Paris. He also won the bronze medal in the men's mixed team sprint C1-C5 at the Paralympic Games in Paris.

In the lead-up to the Paris Paralympics, Boddington won two medals at the 2024 UCI Para-cycling Track World Championships.

== Personal life ==
Boddington was born and grew up in Mooloolaba, Queensland and attended Mountain Creek State High School. In 2007, he was hit by a car, causing serious injuries. Then, in 2011, at the age of fifteen, Boddington had a terrifying motocross accident in Coolum. This led to severe brain bleeding and damage, resulting in his admission to the intensive care unit at the Royal Brisbane Hospital. He has completed two degrees at University of the Sunshine Coast - Bachelor of Exercise Science (2014–2017) and Bachelor of Commerce - Accounting (2019–2021).

Korey is an accountant and business advisor with Rise Accountants, Brisbane.

== Cycling ==
Boddington is classified as a C3 cyclist. He made his Track World Championship debut after claiming four titles at the National Track Championships in December 2023.

At the 2024 UCI Para-cycling Track World Championships in Rio de Janeiro, Brazil, he won two medals - silver medal in the Men's Time Trial C4 and bronze medal in the Mixed Team Sprint C1-5. He also competed in the Men's Individual Pursuit and Scratch races.

At the 2024 Paralympic Games in Paris, France, he won two medals - a gold medal in the Men's Time trial C4-5 setting a new world record, and a bronze medal in the Mixed team sprint C1-5.

At the 2025 UCI Para-cycling Track World Championships in Rio de Janeiro, Brazil, he won four gold medals - Men's Sprint C3, Men's Time Trial C3, Men's Elimination C3 and Mixed Team Sprint C1-5.

Boddington featured in Changing Track - a documentary on the Australian Paralympic Cycling team in the lead up to the 2024 Paris Paralympics.

Boddington is supported by the Queensland Academy of Sport.

== Recognition ==
- 2024 - Queensland Academy of Sport Magic Moment of the Paris 2024 Paralympics.
- 2024 - AusCycling Men's Track Para-cyclist of the Year
- 2025 - Medal of the Order of Australia (OAM) for service to sport as a gold medallist at the Paris Paralympic Games 2024.
- 2025 - Sir Hubert Opperman Trophy for the Australian Cyclist of the Year
- 2025 - AusCycling Men's Track Para-cyclist of the Year
