= Giacomo Salvalaggio =

Italian para-cyclist (born 2001)

Personal information
- Nationality: Italian
- Born: 15 March 2001 (age 25)

Sport
- Sport: Para-cycling
- Disability: Clubfoot
- Disability class: C4
Medal record
Men's para-cycling
Representing Italy
Track World Championships
Bronze medal – third place	2026 Apeldoorn	1 km time trial C4

Giacomo Salvalaggio (born 15 March 2001) is an Italian para-cyclist.

== Career ==
Salvalaggio made his Track World Championships debut at the 2025 UCI Para-cycling Track World Championships with his best finish being fourth place in the elimination C5 event. In October 2026, he competed at the 2026 UCI Para-cycling Track World Championships and won a bronze medal in the 1 km time trial C4 event with a time of 1:05.006.

== Personal life ==
Salvalaggio was born with clubfeet. He underwent surgery on his tendons and ligaments at just six months old, though the operation provided little lasting improvements.
