= Lars-Jörn Zimmer =

German politician (born 1970)

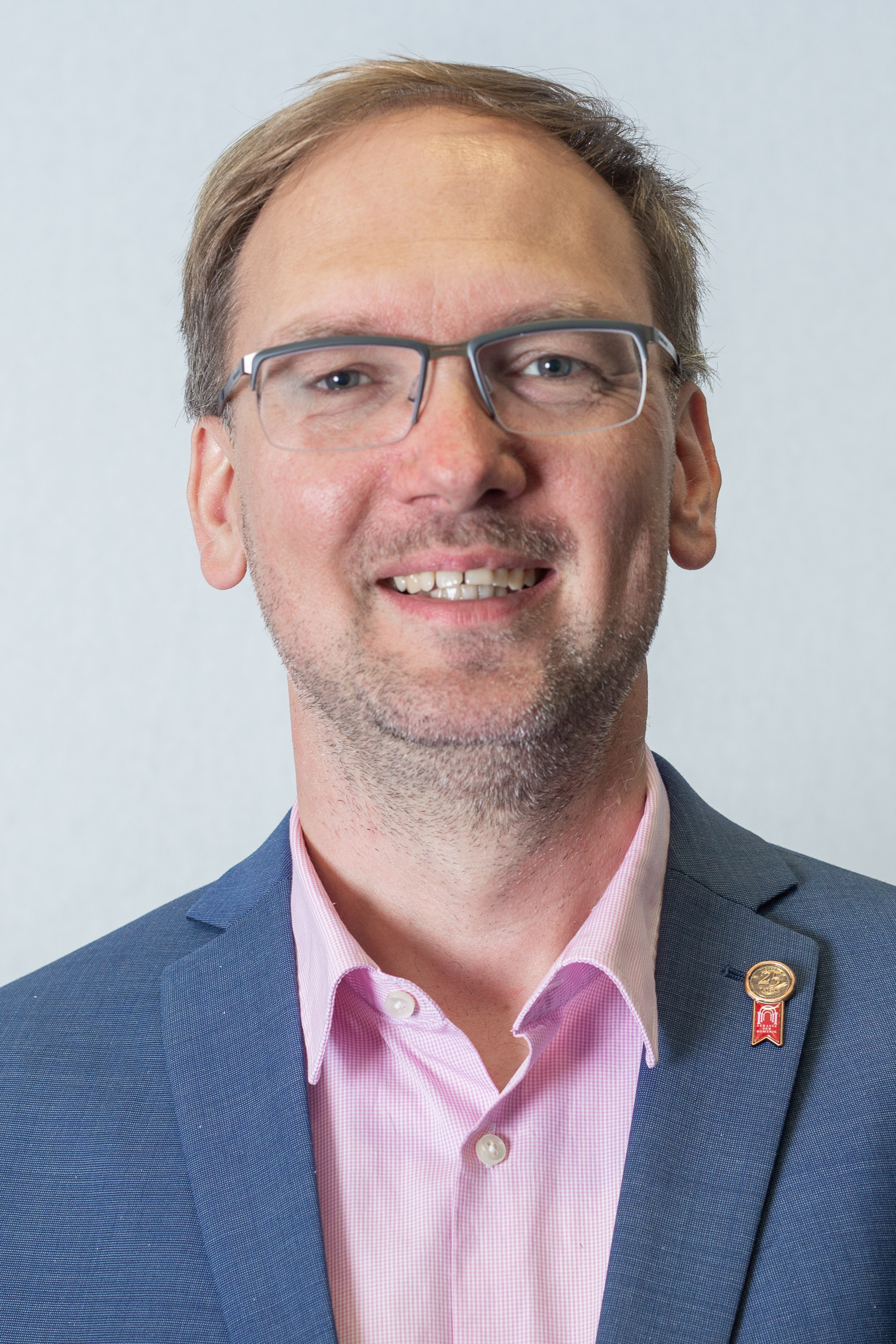
- Zimmer in 2018

Member of the Landtag of Saxony-Anhalt
- Incumbent
- Assumed office 17 May 2016
- Preceded by: Edwina Koch-Kupfer
- Constituency: Bitterfeld-Wolfen (2021–present)
- In office 16 May 2002 – 12 April 2016
- Preceded by: Wolfgang Schaefer
- Succeeded by: Volker Olenicak
- Constituency: Bitterfeld

Personal details
- Born: 4 October 1970 (age 55)
- Party: Christian Democratic Union (since 1994)

Lars-Jörn Zimmer (born 4 October 1970) is a German politician. He has been a member of the Landtag of Saxony-Anhalt since 2016, having previously served from 2002 to 2016. He has served as chairman of the Committee on Economic Affairs and Tourism since 2016.
