= Jörn Dunkel =

German-American mathematician and physicist

- Education: Humboldt University of Berlin; University of Augsburg (Ph.D., 2008)
- Awards: Schmidt Science Polymath Award (2023), Sloan Research Fellowship (2015), Gustav Hertz Prize (2011)
- Scientific career
- Fields: Applied mathematics, Mathematics of data, Biophysics, Soft matter physics
- Workplaces: Massachusetts Institute of Technology
- Thesis: Relativistic Brownian Motion and Diffusion Processes (2008)
- Doctoral advisor: Peter Hänggi

Jörn Dunkel is a German-American mathematician and physicist. He is the MathWorks Professor of Mathematics at the Massachusetts Institute of Technology (MIT). His research combines applied mathematics, physics, and biology to understand collective behavior in complex systems.

== Education and career ==
Dunkel earned diplomas in physics and mathematics from Humboldt University of Berlin, and a Ph.D. in statistical physics from the University of Augsburg in 2008. He conducted postdoctoral work at the University of Oxford and the University of Cambridge. He joined MIT in 2013 and became a full professor in 2022.

== Research ==
Dunkel studies active fluids, soft matter, and the mechanics of living systems. His work has addressed bacterial turbulence, pattern formation in cell monolayers, and morphogenesis.

In 2023, Dunkel was named a Schmidt Science Polymath for his transdisciplinary research spanning mathematics and biology.

== Awards ==
- Schmidt Science Polymath Award (2023)
- Sloan Research Fellowship in Physics (2015)
- Gustav Hertz Prize, German Physical Society (2011)

== Selected publications ==
- Wensink, H. H., Dunkel, J., et al. (2012). "Meso-scale turbulence in living fluids." PNAS, 109(36), 14308–14313.
- Dunkel, J., et al. (2013). "Fluid dynamics of bacterial turbulence." Physical Review Letters, 110(22), 228102.
- Wioland, H., Woodhouse, F. G., Dunkel, J., et al. (2013). "Confinement stabilizes a bacterial suspension into a spiral vortex." Physical Review Letters, 110(26), 268102.
