= Andrea Biancalani =

Italian cyclist (born 2000)

Personal information
- Born: 24 October 2000 (age 26) Rome, Italy

Cycling career
- Sport: Cycling
- Current team: Beltrami TSA–Tre Colli
- Disciplines: Road, track
- Role: Rider

Professional team
- 2022–: Beltrami TSA–Tre Colli
Medal record
Representing Italy
Men's para-cycling
Road World Championships
| Gold medal – first place | 2026 Huntsville | Road race C4 |
Track World Championships
| Gold medal – first place | 2026 Apeldoorn | Scratch C4 |
| Gold medal – first place | 2026 Apeldoorn | Elimination C4 |
Road European Championships
| Gold medal – first place | 2026 Maniago | Road race C4 |

Andrea Biancalani (born 24 October 2000) is an Italian cyclist who currently rides for UCI Continental team Beltrami TSA–Tre Colli. Born with deformed feet, he competes in both elite and para-cycling competitions. In para-cycling, he competes in the C4 category and is a one-time Road World Champion and two-time Track World Champion.

== Early life ==
Biancalani was born with deformed feet. Shortly after his birth, he underwent three surgeries to straighten them, in which his tendons were also lengthened. He also has limited mobility in his ankles.

== Career ==
Biancalani competed in the 2026 UCI Para Cycling Road World Cup, in which he won the overall title. In June 2026, Biancalani competed at the Road European Championships, where he won the road race in his category. In September 2026, Biancalani competed at the Road World Championships, where he competed in the time trial and road race, winning the latter. The following month, he also competed at the Track World Championships, where he won a gold medal in the scratch and elimination races.

== Major results ==
2022
4th Overall Gemenc Grand Prix
4th Circuito del Porto
2023
7th Trofeo Città di Castelfidardo
9th Circuito del Porto
2024
4th Trofeo Città di Castelfidardo
6th Circuito del Porto
2026
2nd GP Industria e Commercio Artigianato Carnarghese
3rd Circuito del Porto
