= C5 (classification) =

Para-cycling classification

C5 is a para-cycling classification. The Union Cycliste Internationale (UCI) recommends this be coded as MC5 or WC5.

== Definition ==
PBS defined this classification as "Cyclists with least impairment, including single amputation and minimal neurological disfunction."

== Classification history ==
Cycling first became a Paralympic sport at the 1988 Summer Paralympics. In September 2006, governance for para-cycling passed from the International Paralympic Committee's International Cycling Committee to UCI at a meeting in Switzerland. When this happened, the responsibility of classifying the sport also changed.

== At the Paralympic Games ==
For the 2016 Summer Paralympics in Rio, the International Paralympic Committee had a zero classification at the Games policy. This policy was put into place in 2014, with the goal of avoiding last minute changes in classes that would negatively impact athlete training preparations. All competitors needed to be internationally classified with their classification status confirmed prior to the Games, with exceptions to this policy being dealt with on a case-by-case basis.

== Historical world records ==
Below are some historical world records for this classification in the 200m men's Indoor track / Flying start.

| Time | Cyclist | Country | Classification | Date and location | Country location | Reference |
| 11"410 | Mario Hammer | GER | C 5 Bicycle | 22 August 2007 BORDEAUX | FRA |
| 11"105 | Jon-Allan Butterworth | GBR | C 5 Bicycle | 23 September 2010 MANCHESTER | GBR |
| 10"897 | Jon-Allan Butterworth | GBR | C 5 Bicycle | 29 September 2011 MANCHESTER | GBR |

== Rankings ==
This classification has UCI rankings for elite competitors.

== Competitors ==
Competitors in this class include Australia's Michael Gallagher and Claire McLean.

== Becoming classified ==
Classification is handled by Union Cycliste Internationale. Classification for the UCI Para-Cycling World Championships is completed by at least two classification panels. Members of the classification panel must not have a relationship with the cyclist and must not be involved in the World Championships in any other role than as classifier. In national competitions, the classification is handled by the national cycling federation. Classification often has three components: physical, technical and observation assessment.

== See also ==
- Para-cycling classification
- Cycling at the Summer Paralympics
