= 2012 BBC Sports Personality of the Year Award =

Sports award in the UK

- Date: 16 December 2012
- Location: ExCeL London
- Country: United Kingdom
- Presented by: British Broadcasting Corporation (BBC)
- Hosted by: Sue Barker; Gary Lineker; Clare Balding
- Winner: Bradley Wiggins
- Website: www.bbc.co.uk/sport/sports-personality/2012

Television/radio coverage
- Network: BBC One; BBC One HD
- Runtime: 155 minutes

The 2012 BBC Sports Personality of the Year Award, presented on 16 December, was the 59th presentation of the BBC Sports Personality of the Year Award. Awarded annually by the British Broadcasting Corporation (BBC), the main titular award honours an individual's British sporting achievement over the past year, with the winner selected by public vote from a 12-person shortlist.

The winner of the 2012 award was Bradley Wiggins, the Tour de France and Olympic time trial champion. The awards ceremony was hosted at ExCeL London, which had been a venue for several sports during the 2012 Olympics and Paralympics.

== Basis of nominations ==
Prior to 2012, a panel of thirty sports journalists each submit a list of ten contenders. From these contenders a shortlist of ten nominees is determined—currently, in the event of a tie at the end of the nomination process, a panel of six former award winners determined the nominee by a Borda count. The shortlist was announced at the beginning of December, and the winner was determined on the night of the ceremony by a public telephone vote.

In 2011 the shortlist produced only contained male competitors, which caused media uproar. The selection process for contenders was changed for the 2012 (and future) awards as follows:

The BBC introduced an expert panel who were asked to devise a shortlist that reflected UK sporting achievements on the national and/or international stage, represented the breadth and depth of UK sports and took into account "impact" within and beyond the sport or sporting achievement in question.

The 2012 panel comprised:

- Barbara Slater, Director of BBC Sport (Chair)
- The BBC’s Head of TV Sport (Philip Bernie)
- The Executive Editor of BBC Sports Personality of the Year (Carl Doran).
- A representative from BBC Radio 5 Live - this year, Eleanor Oldroyd.
- Three national newspaper sports editors (to be rotated annually) - this year, Mike Dunn (The Sun), Lee Clayton (Daily Mail) and Matthew Hancock (The Observer)
- Three former nominees (to be appointed annually) - this year, Sir Steve Redgrave, Baroness Tanni Grey-Thompson and Denise Lewis OBE
- A pan-sports broadcaster/journalist - this year, Sue Mott
- Baroness Sue Campbell, Chair of UK Sport.

The panel would endeavour to produce a shortlist based on reaching a consensus view. If a consensus view cannot be reached on all or some of the candidates, then they will be asked to vote for the remaining candidates.

In 2012, following the success of the London 2012 Olympic Games, the SPOTY shortlist was expanded to 12 contenders.

== Nominees ==
The nominees for the 2012 award, as described by the BBC, and their share of the votes cast were as follows:

Nominee	Sport	2012 achievement	BBC Profile	Votes (percentage)
Bradley Wiggins	Cycling	Won the 2012 Tour de France, the first Briton to do so. Also won Olympic gold in the time trial, a record-equalling seventh medal for a British sportsman. Became the first cyclist to win Olympic track gold and the Tour de France, and the first cyclist to win the Tour and Olympic gold in the same year.		492,064 (30.25%)
Jessica Ennis	Athletics	Won Olympic gold in the heptathlon with three personal bests in the seven events. Ennis broke the British record for heptathlon twice in 2012, and the British record for 100m hurdles.		372,765 (22.92%)
Andy Murray	Tennis	Won the US Open against Novak Djokovic, the first British major tennis champion of either sex in 35 years and the first British man to win a major in 76 years. Also won Olympic gold in the Men's singles, the first Briton to do so since 1908, and silver (with Laura Robson) in the Mixed doubles; Murray was the only British Olympian to win two medals on the same day during the 2012 games. Murray was also the first British man to reach the Wimbledon final in 76 years.		230,444 (14.17%)
Mo Farah	Athletics	Won two Olympic golds in the 5000m and 10,000, the first Briton, the first athlete competing at a home games, and only the seventh man in history to win both at the same Olympic Games. Also became the first man to successfully defend the European 5000m title.		131,327 (8.07%)
David Weir	Athletics	Won four Paralympic golds medals in the 1500m T54, 5000m T54, 800m T54 and T54 marathon. Also won the London Marathon wheelchair race for a record-equalling sixth time.		114,633 (7.05%)
Ellie Simmonds	Swimming	Won two Paralympic golds medals in the S6 400m freestyle and SM6 200m individual medley, as well as silver in the S6 100m freestyle and bronze in the S6 50m freestyle.		102,894 (6.33%)
Sir Chris Hoy	Cycling	Won Olympic gold in the team sprint (with Philip Hindes and Jason Kenny) and men's keirin, making a British record of six Olympic golds in all. Also won the World Championship in keirin, his 11th World title.		42,961 (2.64%)
Nicola Adams	Boxing	Won Olympic gold in the Women's flyweight, the first woman to win an Olympic boxing title. Also won World silver medal.		35,560 (2.19%)
Ben Ainslie	Sailing	Won Olympic gold in the Finn class, his fourth straight gold medal making him the most decorated Olympic sailor in history. Also won World Finn Championship		35,373 (2.17%)
Rory McIlroy	Golf	Won the 2012 PGA Championship, becoming the youngest player to win two majors since Seve Ballesteros. Featured in Europe's Ryder Cup comeback victory over the United States and ranked number one in the world, winning the 2012 money list on both the PGA and European tours.		29,729 (1.83%)
Katherine Grainger	Rowing	Won Olympic gold in the double sculls (with Anna Watkins), after previously winning three silvers at successive Games. Became the first female British athlete in any sport to win a medal at four successive Olympics.		28,626 (1.76%)
Sarah Storey	Cycling	Won four Paralympic golds medals in the C5 individual pursuit, C4–5 500m time trial, C5 road time trial and C4–5 road race, for a modern era British record-equalling total of 11 gold medals.		10,342 (0.64%)

== Voting process ==
The winner was decided by a public vote on the night of the awards ceremony. Unlike past years the voting opened after every contender has shown a video of them achieving in their sport, not at the beginning of the show.

== Other awards ==
In addition to the main award as "Sports Personality of the Year", several other awards were also announced:

- Team of the Year: Team GB
- Coach of the Year: Dave Brailsford
- Overseas Personality: Usain Bolt
- Young Personality: Josef Craig
- Unsung Hero Award: Sue and Jim Houghton (Community Sports Organisers)
- Lifetime Achievement: Lord Coe
- Helen Rollason Award: Martine Wright

== In Memoriam ==
- Sid Waddell
- Tommy Godwin
- Gary Ablett
- Teofilo Stevenson
- Don Wilson
- John Connelly
- Angelo Dundee
- Sarah Burke
- Nigel Doughty
- John Oaksey
- Terry Spinks
- Mitchell Cole
- David Tait
- Brian Woolnough
- Danny Fullbrook
- Lee Richardson
- Mervyn Davies
- John Bond
- Stephen Packer
- Jack Taylor
- Tom Maynard
- Alexander Dale Oen
- Dave Sexton
- Jocky Wilson
- Kenny Morgans
- Paidi O Se
- Phil Taylor
- Emanuel Steward
- Gordon West
- Selorm Kuadey
- Sid Watkins
- Mitchell Todd
- Ivor Powell
- Joe Egan
- Alan McDonald
- Josh Gifford
- Margaret Osborne duPont
- Campbell Gillies
- Nevin Spence
