= Cycling at the 2012 Summer Paralympics – Women's road race H1–3 =

Cycling, Women's road race H1-3 at the XIV Paralympic Games
- Venue: Brands Hatch
- Dates: September 7, 2012
- Competitors: 15 from 10 nations

Medalists
1st place, gold medalist(s)		Marianna Davis	United States
2nd place, silver medalist(s)		Monica Bascio	United States
3rd place, bronze medalist(s)		Rachel Morris	Great Britain

The Women's road race H1-3 cycling event at the 2012 Summer Paralympics took place on September 7 at Brands Hatch. Fifteen riders from ten different nations competed. The race distance was 48 km.

Rachel Morris and Karen Darke chose to finish together, and crossed the finish line holding hands. A photo finish showed Morris's front wheel crossed the line first, so she was awarded the bronze medal.

== Results ==
DNF = Did not finish. LAP=Lapped (8 km).

Rank	Name	Country	Class	Time
1st place, gold medalist(s)	Marianna Davis	United States	H2	1:41:34
2nd place, silver medalist(s)	Monica Bascio	United States	H3	1:42:07
3rd place, bronze medalist(s)	Rachel Morris	Great Britain	H3	1:43:08
4	Karen Darke	Great Britain	H2	1:43:08
5	Sandra Graf	Switzerland	H3	1:50:13
6	Svetlana Moshkovich	Russia	H3	1:51:29
7	Francesca Fenocchio	Italy	H2	1:55:10
8	Susan Reid	New Zealand	H3	2:00:39
9	Claudia Schuler	Italy	H2	2:02:15
10	Anna Oroszova	Slovakia	H2	2:03:55
	Kim Jung Im	South Korea	H3	LAP
	Kadidia Nikiema	Burkina Faso	H3	LAP
	Murielle Lambert	France	H3	LAP
	Alicia Dana	United States	H2	DNF
	Ursula Schwaller	Switzerland	H2	DNF
