= Switzerland at the 2012 Summer Paralympics =

- IPC code: SUI
- NPC: Swiss Paralympic Committee
- Website: www.swissparalympic.ch

in London
- Competitors: 25 in 7 sports
- Medals Ranked 33rd: Gold 3 Silver 6 Bronze 4 Total 13

Summer Paralympics appearances (overview)
- 1960; 1964; 1968; 1972; 1976; 1980; 1984; 1988; 1992; 1996; 2000; 2004; 2008; 2012; 2016; 2020; 2024

Switzerland competed at the 2012 Summer Paralympics in London, United Kingdom from August 29 to September 9, 2012.

== Medallists ==
Medal	Name	Sport	Event	Date
Gold	Edith Wolf	Athletics	Women's 5000m T54	2 September
Gold	Heinz Frei	Cycling	Men's Time Trial H2	5 September
Gold	Sandra Graf	Cycling	Women's Time Trial H3	5 September
Silver	Edith Wolf	Athletics	Women's 800m T54	5 September
Silver	Marcel Hug	Athletics	Men's 800m T54	6 September
Silver	Edith Wolf	Athletics	Women's 1500m T54	7 September
Silver	Tobias Fankhauser	Cycling	Men's Road Race H1	7 September
Silver	Jean-Marc Berset	Cycling	Men's Road Race H2	7 September
Silver	Marcel Hug	Athletics	Men's Marathon T54	9 September
Bronze	Edith Wolf	Athletics	Women's 400m T54	3 September
Bronze	Ursula Schwaller	Cycling	Women's Time Trial H1-2	5 September
Bronze	Jean-Marc Berset; Heinz Frei; Ursula Schwaller	Cycling	Mixed Team Relay H1-4	8 September
Bronze	Sandra Graf	Athletics	Women's Marathon T54	9 September

== Archery ==
Men

Athlete	Event	Ranking round		Round of 32	Round of 16	Quarterfinals	Semifinals	Finals	
Athlete	Event	Score	Seed	Opposition score	Opposition score	Opposition score	Opposition score	Opposition score	Rank
Philippe Horner	Ind. Compound Open	656	8	Evans (CAN); L 4-6	did not advance				

Women

Athlete	Event	Ranking round		Round of 32	Round of 16	Quarterfinals	Semifinals	Finals	
Athlete	Event	Score	Seed	Opposition score	Opposition score	Opposition score	Opposition score	Opposition score	Rank
Magali Comte	Ind. Recurve Standing	514	12	Bye	Mohammadi (IRI); W 6-2	Lee (KOR); L 4-6	did not advance		

== Athletics ==
Men's Track and Road Events

Athlete	Event	Heat		Final	
Athlete	Event	Result	Rank	Result	Rank
Philipp Handler	100m T13	11.45	5	did not advance	
Philipp Handler	200m T13	23.45	5	did not advance	
Bojan Mitic	100m T34	16.56	1 Q	16.69	4
Bojan Mitic	200m T34	30.23	2 Q	30.35	4
Christoph Bausch	100m T44	12.09	4	did not advance	
Christoph Bausch	200m T44	24.22	4 q	23.70	6
Beat Boesch	100m T52	17.99	2 Q	18.41	4
Beat Boesch	200m T52	31.93	2 Q	32.75	4
Beat Boesch	400m T52	1:04.83	3 Q	1:07.72	6
Marcel Hug	400m T54	48.87	2 Q	47.80	5
Marcel Hug	800m T54	1:38.27	2 Q	1:37.84	2nd place, silver medalist(s)
Marcel Hug	1500m T54	3:11.17	1 Q	3:12.76	4
Marcel Hug	5000m T54	11:31.78	1 Q	11:08.16	4
Marcel Hug	Marathon T54	—N/a		1:30:21	2nd place, silver medalist(s)
Christoph Sommer	Marathon T46	—N/a		3:01:42	11
Heinz Frei	Marathon T54	—N/a		1:33:06	11

Women's Track and Road Events

Athlete	Event	Heat		Final	
Athlete	Event	Result	Rank	Result	Rank
Manuela Schaer	100m T54	16.92	3 Q	16.76	5
Manuela Schaer	400m T54	57.47	4 q	57.57	7
Manuela Schaer	800m T54	1:56.60	2 Q	1:50.90	5
Alexandra Helbling	100m T54	18.53	5	did not advance	
Alexandra Helbling	800m T54	1:56.49	6	did not advance	
Alexandra Helbling	1500m T54	3:43.59	6	did not advance	
Edith Wolf	400m T54	56.35	3 Q	56.25	3rd place, bronze medalist(s)
Edith Wolf	800m T54	1:53.13	1 Q	1:49.87	2nd place, silver medalist(s)
Edith Wolf	1500m T54	3:32.04	2 Q	3:36.78	2nd place, silver medalist(s)
Edith Wolf	5000m T54	12:23.61	1 Q	12:27.87	1st place, gold medalist(s)
Edith Wolf	Marathon T54	—N/a		DNF	
Patricia Keller	400m T54	1:01.74	7	did not advance	
Patricia Keller	5000m T54	12:51.49	4 q	12:29.38	10
Patricia Keller	Marathon T54	—N/a		2:06:07	10
Sandra Graf	5000m T54	13:12.82	5	did not advance	
Sandra Graf	Marathon T54	—N/a		1:46:35	3rd place, bronze medalist(s)

== Cycling ==
=== Road ===
Men

Athlete	Event	Time	Rank
Tobias Fankhauser	Road Race H1	1:53:11	2nd place, silver medalist(s)
Tobias Fankhauser	Time Trial H1	40:34.48	9
Jean-Marc Berset	Road Race H2	1:37:59	2nd place, silver medalist(s)
Jean-Marc Berset	Time Trial H2	28:01.90	5
Heinz Frei	Road Race H2	1:38:19	5
Heinz Frei	Time Trial H2	26:52.39	1st place, gold medalist(s)
Lukas Weber	Road Race H2	1:38:19	4
Lukas Weber	Time Trial H2	27:27.73	4

Women

Athlete	Event	Time	Rank
Ursula Schwaller	Road Race H1-3	DNF	
Ursula Schwaller	Time Trial H1-2	34:56.55	3rd place, bronze medalist(s)
Sandra Graf	Road Race H1-3	1:50:13	5
Sandra Graf	Time Trial H3	33:21.61	1st place, gold medalist(s)
Annina Schillig	Road Race C4-5	1:55:43	7
Annina Schillig	Time Trial C5	28:40.72	10
Sara Tretola	Road Race C4-5	1:57:19	12
Sara Tretola	Time Trial C5	27:07.57	8

Mixed

Athlete	Event	Time	Rank
Jean-Marc Berset; Heinz Frei; Ursula Schwaller	Team Relay H1-4	30:58.00	3rd place, bronze medalist(s)

=== Track ===
Time Trial

Athlete	Event	Time	Rank
Annina Schillig	Women's 500m Time Trial C4-5	43.248	13
Sara Tretola	Women's 500m Time Trial C4-5	44.122	14

Individual Pursuit

Athlete	Event	Heats		Final	
Athlete	Event	Time	Rank	Time	Rank
Annina Schillig	Women's Individual Pursuit C5	4:21.481	10	did not advance	
Sara Tretola	Women's Individual Pursuit C5	4:14.950	9	did not advance	

== Shooting ==
Athlete	Event	Qualification		Final	
Athlete	Event	Score	Rank	Score	Rank
Paul Schnider	Men's 10m Air Pistol SH1	555	18	did not advance	
Paul Schnider	Mixed 25m Pistol SH1	551	14	did not advance	
Paul Schnider	Mixed 50m Pistol SH1	526	11	did not advance	

== Swimming ==
Women

Athletes	Event	Heat		Final	
Athletes	Event	Time	Rank	Time	Rank
Chantal Cavin	50m freestyle S11	35.76	11	did not advance	
Chantal Cavin	100m freestyle S11	1:19.80	12	did not advance	
Chantal Cavin	400m freestyle S11	6:05.55	7 Q	6:11.29	7

== Table tennis ==
Men

Athlete	Event	Group Stage			Semifinals	Final	
Athlete	Event	Opposition Result	Opposition Result	Rank	Opposition Result	Opposition Result	Rank
Silvio Keller	Individual C1	Nikelis (GER); L 0-3	Cho (KOR); W 3-1	2	did not advance		

== Wheelchair Tennis ==
Athlete	Event	Round of 64	Round of 32	Round of 16	Quarterfinals	Semifinals	Final	
Athlete	Event	Opposition Result	Opposition Result	Opposition Result	Opposition Result	Opposition Result	Opposition Result	Rank
Yann Avanthey	Men's Singles	Mharakurwa (ZIM); L 4-6, 3-6	did not advance					
Daniel Pellegrina	Men's Singles	Lee (KOR); L 1-6, 1-6	did not advance					
Yann Avanthey; Daniel Pellegrina	Men's Doubles	—N/a	Jewitt, Phillipson (GBR); L 3-6, 2-6	did not advance				

== See also ==
- Switzerland at the 2012 Summer Olympics
