= Cycling at the 2016 Summer Paralympics – Women's 500 m time trial C4–5 =

Cycling, Women's 500 m Time Trial C4-5 at the XV Paralympic Games
- Venue: Rio Olympic Velodrome
- Dates: September 10, 2016
- Competitors: 14 from 8 nations

Medalists
1st place, gold medalist(s)		Kadeena Cox	Great Britain
2nd place, silver medalist(s)		Jufang Zhou	China
3rd place, bronze medalist(s)		Jianping Ruan	China

The Women's 500 metre Time Trial C4-5 track cycling event at the 2016 Summer Paralympics took place on September 10. 14 riders competed. Kadeena Cox of Great Britain took the gold medal in a new C4 world record. In doing so, she became the first British paralympian in 24 years to win medals in two different sports at the same Games, having already won a bronze medal in athletics in the women's 100 metres T38 event.

== Results ==
Rank	Athlete	Nation	Classification	Time	Factor	Final time
1st place, gold medalist(s)	Kadeena Cox	Great Britain	C4	35.716 WR	96.87	34.598
2nd place, silver medalist(s)	Jufang Zhou	China	C5	36.004 WR	100	36.004
3rd place, bronze medalist(s)	Jianping Ruan	China	C4	37.739	96.87	36.557
4	Sarah Storey	Great Britain	C5	37.068	100	37.068
5	Crystal Lane	Great Britain	C5	37.346	100	37.346
6	Katherine Horan	New Zealand	C4	38.97	96.87	37.75
7	Jennifer Schuble	United States	C5	38.754	100	38.754
8	Susan Powell	Australia	C4	40.239	96.87	38.979
9	Megan Fisher	United States	C4	40.819	96.87	39.541
10	Samantha Bosco	United States	C5	40.09	100	40.09
11	Mariela Delgado	Argentina	C5	40.222	100	40.222
12	Alexandra Lisney	Australia	C4	42.143	96.87	40.823
13	Anna Harkowska	Poland	C5	41.094	100	41.094
14	Jenny Narcisi	Italy	C4	46.889	96.87	45.421
