= Cycling at the 2012 Summer Paralympics – Women's road time trial H1–2 =

Cycling, Women's road time trial H1-2 at the XIV Paralympic Games
- Venue: Brands Hatch
- Dates: September 5, 2012
- Competitors: 7 from 5 nations

Medalists
1st place, gold medalist(s)		Marianna Davis	United States
2nd place, silver medalist(s)		Karen Darke	Great Britain
3rd place, bronze medalist(s)		Ursula Schwaller	Switzerland

The Women's time trial H1-2 road cycling event at the 2012 Summer Paralympics took place on September 5 at Brands Hatch. Seven riders from five different nations competed - in practice all 7 were classified H2. The race distance was 16 km.

== Results ==
Rank	Name	Country	Time
1st place, gold medalist(s)	Marianna Davis	United States	31:06.39
2nd place, silver medalist(s)	Karen Darke	Great Britain	33:16.09
3rd place, bronze medalist(s)	Ursula Schwaller	Switzerland	34:56.55
4	Francesca Fenocchio	Italy	35:35.46
5	Alicia Dana	United States	37:14.18
6	Claudia Schuler	Italy	37:23.61
7	Anna Oroszova	Slovakia	38:04.16
