= Cycling at the 2012 Summer Paralympics – Women's road time trial H3 =

Cycling, Women's road time trial H3 at the XIV Paralympic Games
- Venue: Brands Hatch
- Dates: September 5, 2012
- Competitors: 8 from 8 nations

Medalists
1st place, gold medalist(s)		Sandra Graf	Switzerland
2nd place, silver medalist(s)		Monica Bascio	United States
3rd place, bronze medalist(s)		Svetlana Moshkovich	Russia

The Women's time trial H3 road cycling event at the 2012 Summer Paralympics took place on September 5 at Brands Hatch. Eight riders from eight nations competed. The race distance was 16 km.

== Results ==
Rank	Name	Country	Time
1st place, gold medalist(s)	Sandra Graf	Switzerland	33:21.61
2nd place, silver medalist(s)	Monica Bascio	United States	33:39.26
3rd place, bronze medalist(s)	Svetlana Moshkovich	Russia	34:08.48
4	Susan Reid	New Zealand	36:00.46
5	Rachel Morris	Great Britain	36:38.97
6	Kadidia Nikiema	Burkina Faso	43:15.64
7	Kim Jung Im	South Korea	43:25.32
8	Murielle Lambert	France	45:38.01
