= Verônica Hipólito =

Brazilian Paralympic athlete (born 1996)

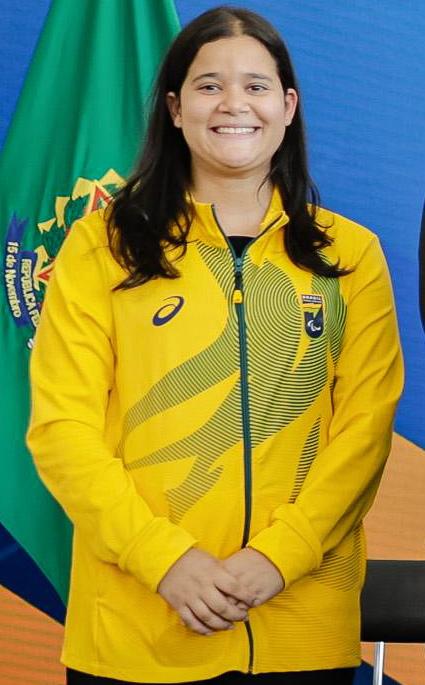
- Hipólito in 2025

Personal information
- Full name: Verônica Silva Hipólito
- Born: 2 June 1996 (age 30) São Bernardo do Campo, Brazil

Sport
- Sport: Para athletics
- Disability class: T37
- Event: Sprint
- Club: Time Naurú
Medal record
Women's para athletics
Representing Brazil
Paralympic Games
Silver medal – second place	2016 Rio de Janeiro	100 m – T38
Bronze medal – third place	2016 Rio de Janeiro	400 m – T38
Bronze medal – third place	2024 Paris	100 m – T36
World Championships
Gold medal – first place	2013 Lyon	200 m – T38
Silver medal – second place	2013 Lyon	100 m – T38
Bronze medal – third place	2024 Kobe	100 m – T36
Bronze medal – third place	2025 New Delhi	100 m – T36
Parapan American Games
Gold medal – first place	2015 Toronto	100 m – T38
Gold medal – first place	2015 Toronto	200 m – T38
Gold medal – first place	2015 Toronto	400 m – T38
Silver medal – second place	2015 Toronto	Long jump T20/37/38
Silver medal – second place	2019 Lima	100 m – T37
Silver medal – second place	2019 Lima	200 m – T37
Silver medal – second place	2019 Lima	4x100 m relay
Para-South American Games
Gold medal – first place	2014 Santiago	100 m
Gold medal – first place	2014 Santiago	200 m
Gold medal – first place	2014 Santiago	Long jump

Verônica Silva Hipólito (Note: This name uses Portuguese naming customs: the first or maternal family name is Silva and the second or paternal family name is Hipólito.) (born 2 June 1996) is a para-athlete from Brazil competing mainly in category T37 sprint events. She competed as an able-bodied athlete before a stroke in 2011 left her with permanent damage to the right side of her body. In 2013, she discovered that she was eligible to compete in Paralympic sports and that year represented Brazil at the 2013 IPC Athletics World Championships.

== Personal history ==
Hipólito was born in São Bernardo do Campo, Brazil in 1996. The search for quality of life was one of the reasons that led Verônica to athletics. Her parents, José Dimas and Josenilda, always encouraged her to practice sports so that the girl could start interacting more, since she was very shy. In 2008, she discovered that she had a brain tumour, which was removed. She started playing sports at the age of 10 in judo, but a head surgery to remove a brain tumor at the age of 13 prevented her from continuing on the mats.

In March 2011, at the age of 14, she had a stroke that affected the movement on the right side of her body and she lost strength in both her right leg and arm.

She started practicing athletics as a form of rehabilitation to be able to walk again. Her brain tumour returned in 2012 which she treated with medication.

== Career history ==
=== Early years ===
In mid-2012, Verônica began competing, and by 2013, at the age of 17, she won her first adult world championship, earning the nickname "Garota Prodígio" (Prodigy Girl).

Hipólito took up athletics at the age of ten after her parents chose the sport in an effort to help her make friends and learn the value of effort. She competed in able-bodied athletics until the beginning of 2013, when she discovered that due to the damage caused by her stroke, that she was eligible to compete in para-athletic events. That same year, Veronica along with her doctors, decided that she would start a treatment with medication.

Later that year she was selected to represent Brazil at the 2013 IPC Athletics World Championships. There she competed in three events, the 100 m and 200 m T38 sprints and the long jump T37/38. In the long jump she finished sixth, but she medalled in both the 100 m (silver) and the 200 m (gold). The following year she participated in the 2014 Para-South American Games in Santiago where she won gold in the 100 m, 200 m and long jump events.

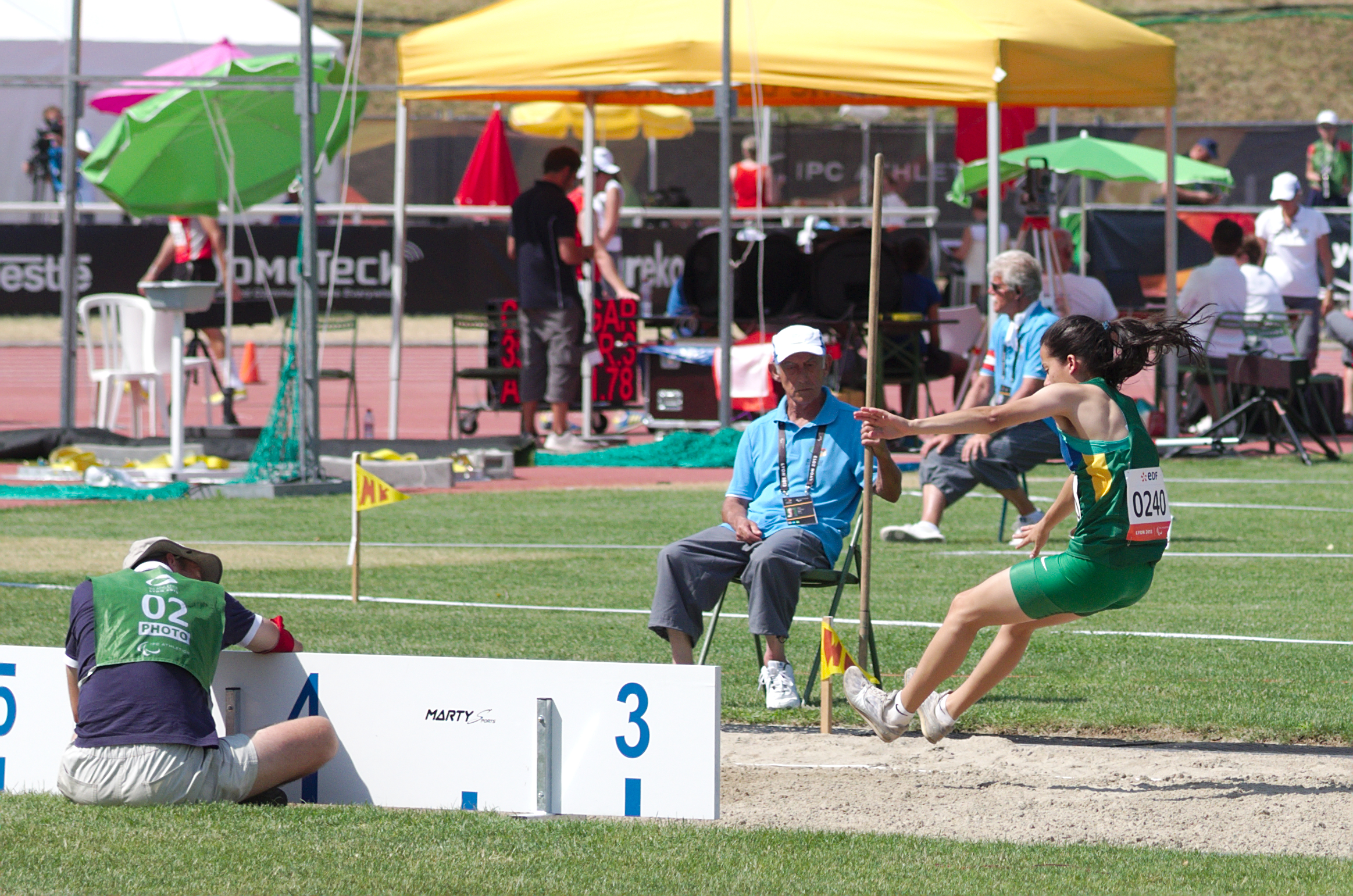
Hipólito in the Women's Long Jump competition at the 2013 IPC World Championships

In 2015, after being diagnosed with severe anemia and undergoing treatments to restore her iron levels, she was diagnosed with a rare syndrome called Familial Adenomatous Polyposis just before the 2015 Parapan American Games in Toronto and the world championship. Despite the diagnosis, she participated in the Games, winning three gold medals and one silver, becoming the most decorated and youngest medalist of the Parapan American Games. After the competition, she underwent surgery to remove 90% of her large intestine and returned to training only in February 2016.

=== Rio 2016 ===
Due to the brain tumor, Verônica continued treatment with strong medication, yet she managed to participate in the 2016 Summer Paralympics in Rio de Janeiro, where she won a silver medal and a bronze medal. During the Games, she made several appearances on the Brazilian cable television network SPORTV, becoming a well-known figure to the public.

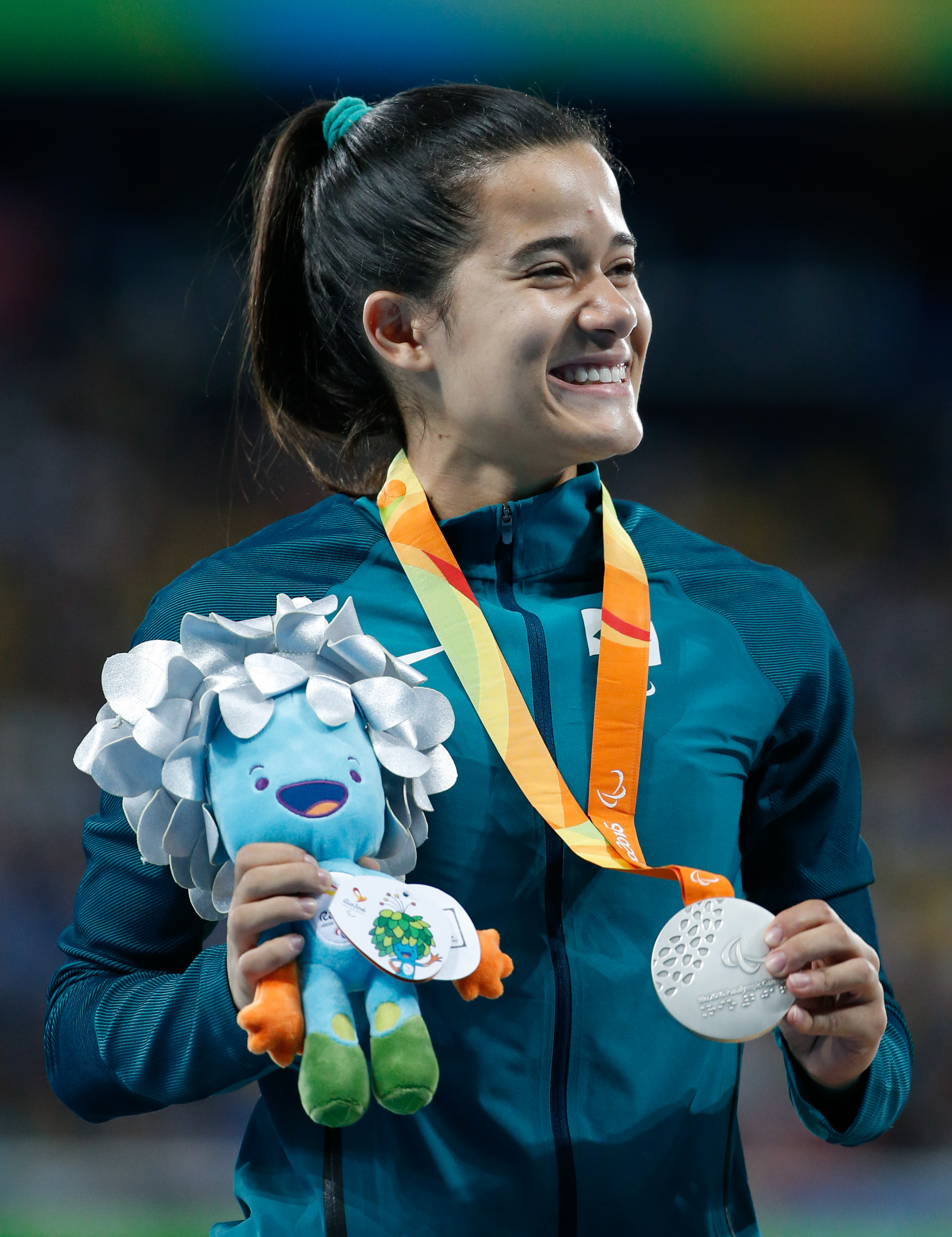
Hipólito with her silver medal won in the Rio 2016 Paralympics

=== Further surgeries ===
At the beginning of 2017, she underwent another brain surgery to remove a tumor. Four months later, she returned to training and resumed her high-performance career. In 2018, she had to undergo another surgery to remove the tumor again, and by the end of the year, she resumed training. This time, recovery was slower and more complicated, as Verônica faced several health issues, including pneumonia and weight gain due to strong medication. She only returned to competition a year after the surgery.

=== Class change ===
In 2019, before officially returning to competition, she had to undergo a new functional classification process. Due to reduced mobility on the right side of her body, she was reclassified into a new category, T37, designated for athletes with slightly greater physical impairments than her previous class.

In just her second competition in the T37 class, she recorded a time of 14.44 seconds, breaking the Brazilian record for the category.

=== Lima 2019 ===
Despite only a few months of training after her last surgery, Verônica achieved significant results and was called up to participate in the 2019 Parapan American Games in Lima. Although still far from her ideal form, Verônica surprised everyone by winning three silver medals in the 100m and 200m T37 races and the universal 4 × 100 m relay.

=== Tokyo 2020 ===
In 2021, Verônica announced that the tumor in her brain had returned. As a result, she was unable to achieve the qualifying standard to represent Brazil at the 2020 Summer Paralympics in Tokyo and was not selected. However, she was hired as a commentator for the Brazilian cable television sports channel SporTV to cover the athletics events at the Games. She was considered one of the highlights of the broadcasts, where she brought discussions about ableism to a broader audience.

=== Santiago 2023 ===
Hipólito did not compete at the 2023 Parapan American Games in Santiago, but she once again participated in the SporTV broadcasts during the Games.

=== 2024 ===
In March 2024, Verônica Hipólito was one of the athletes selected to represent Brazil at the Grand Prix of Paralympic Athletics in Dubai, where the Brazilian delegation won six medals, including a silver medal for Verônica in the 100 meters T36.

In April, she was called up by the Brazilian Paralympic Committee for the World Athletics Championships in Japan. At the 2024 World Para Athletics Championships, Verônica won a gold medal in the 100 meters T36, reaffirming her place among the best athletes in her category. In that same year, Hipólito was featured in advertising campaigns aiming for greater consumer engagement, such as the one from Docile, which sponsored Team Brazil and Paralympic athletes.

=== Paris 2024 ===
In September 2024, Verônica Hipólito competed at the Paralympics in Paris. Despite her dedication, she did not reach the podium in the 200 meters T36, leading to an emotional statement on social media about her struggles and achievements throughout her career. A few days later, she surprised everyone by winning the bronze medal in the 100 meters T36 event, marking her return to the podium eight years after her last Paralympic medal.

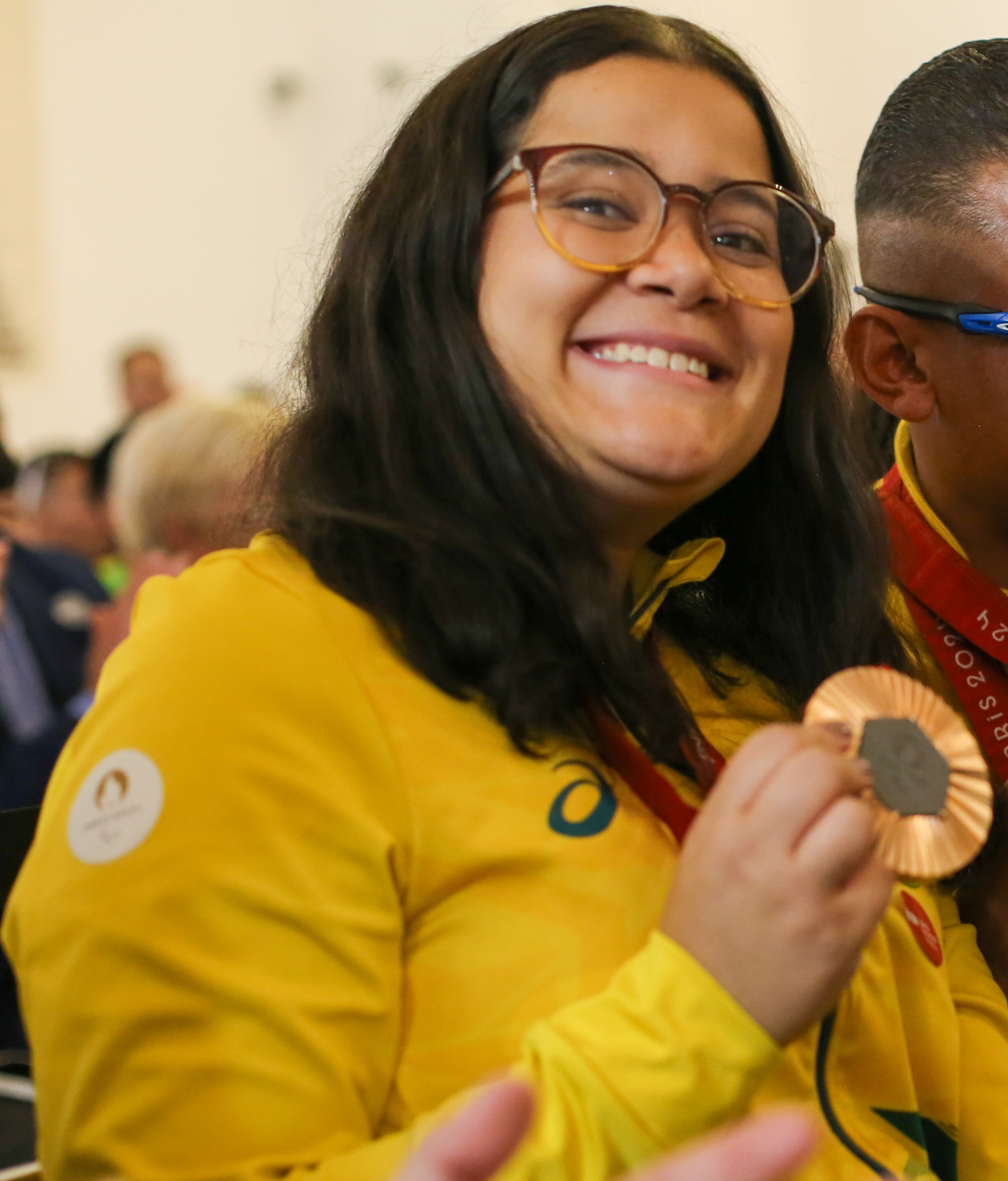
Hipólito in 2024 with her Paris Paralympics medal

Upon returning to Brazil after the Paralympics, Verônica shared her emotions about returning to the podium and reflected on the challenges she had faced in recent years, including her battle against a brain tumor.

=== 2025 ===
In 2025 Verônica Hipólito won the bronze medal in the 100m T36, with a time of 14.77 seconds at the World Para Athletics Championships, that took place in New Delhi, India.

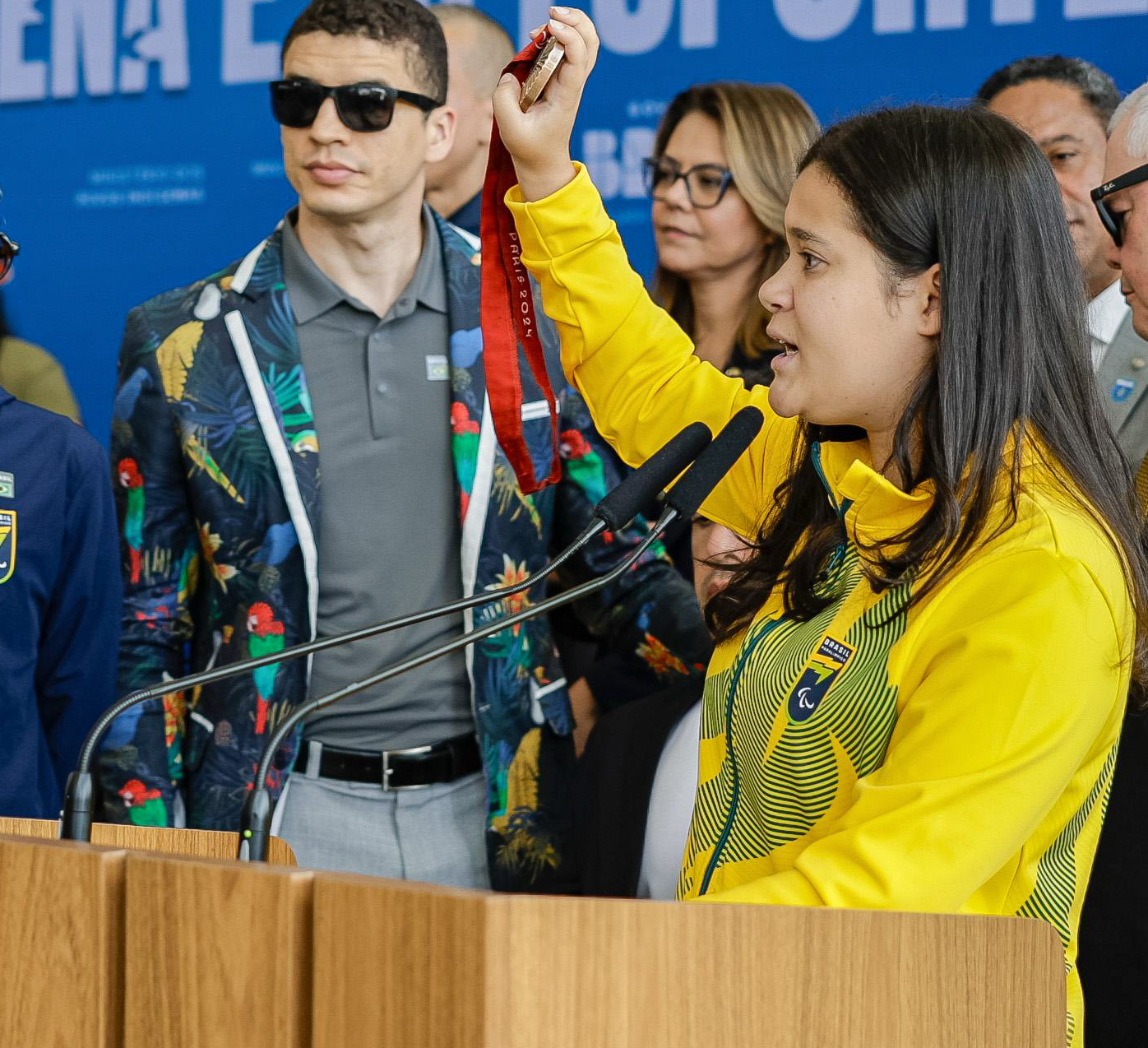
Verônica Hipólito in 2025 at an event in Brasília

In December, Hipólito was a finalist at the "Atleta da Galera" (People's Choice Athlete) at the Brazilian Paralympic Awards.

== Activities outside the track ==
=== Sports Management ===
At the end of 2019, Verônica created Time Naurú, a Paralympic athletics team to compete in regional and national competitions organized by the Brazilian Paralympic Committee. In addition to competing for the team, she also took on the role of its main manager at just 24 years old. The team includes other Brazilian Paralympic athletes, such as Felipe Gomes, Viviane Ferreira Soares, Fabrício Junior Barros, and Davi Wilker de Souza, among others. In 2022, Naurú established its first athletics school in Santo André, providing training for children and young athletes in the region.

=== Civic and political activities ===
On November 14, 2022, Verônica was appointed as one of the specialists in the Technical Sports Group of the Brazilian Presidential Transition Office. This group was responsible for assessing the state of public policies in the country and proposing solutions for identified issues, as well as improvements to existing initiatives, contributing to the final report of the 2022–2023 Government Transition Team.

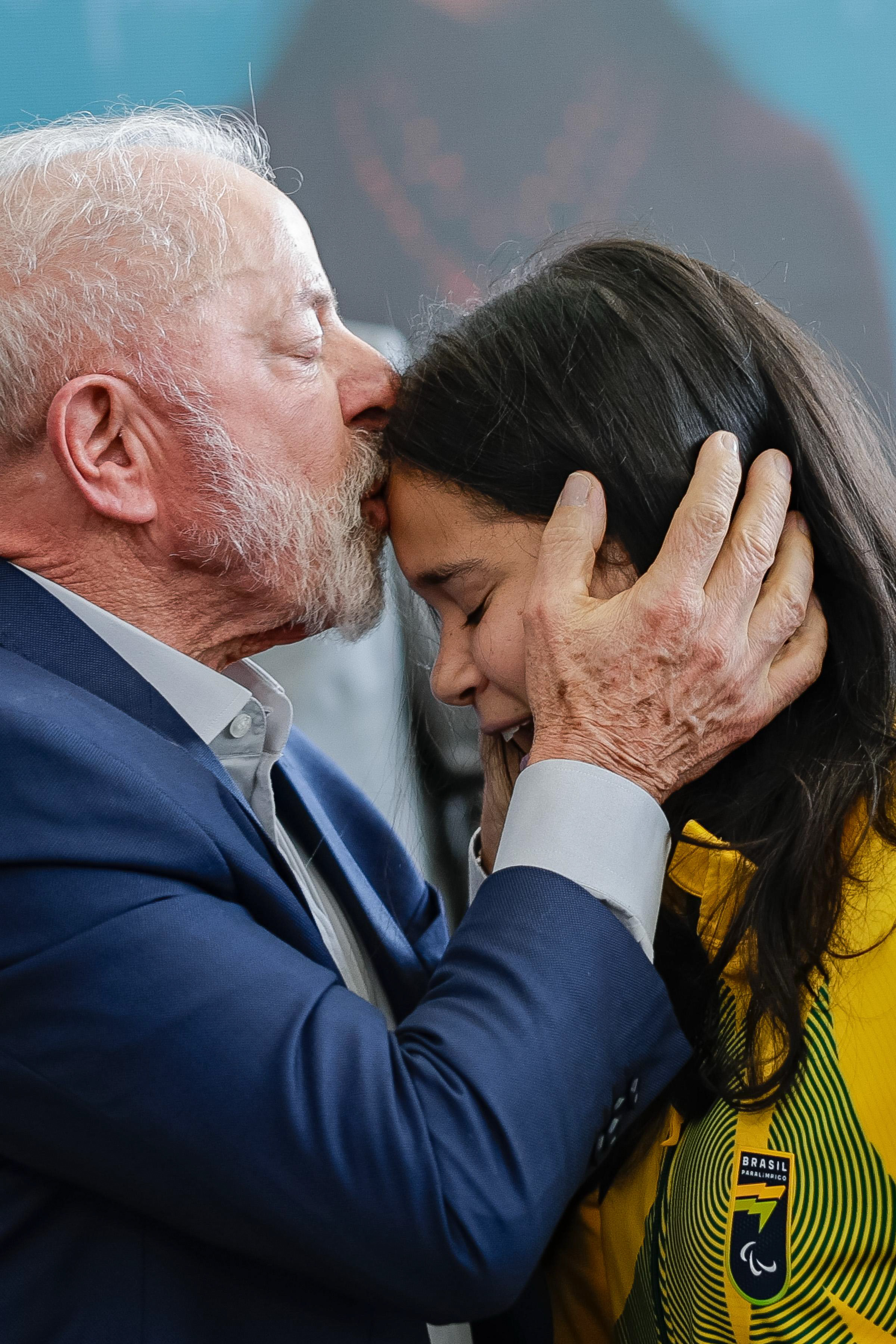
Hipólito in 2025 with the then President of Brazil, Luiz Inácio Lula da Silva
