= Cycling at the 2012 Summer Paralympics – Mixed road team relay =

Cycling, mixed team relay at the XIV Paralympic Games
- Venue: Brands Hatch
- Dates: September 8
- Competitors: 7

Medalists
1st place, gold medalist(s)		Matthew Updike; Oscar Sanchez; Marianna Davis	United States
2nd place, silver medalist(s)		Vittorio Podesta; Alex Zanardi; Francesca Fenocchio	Italy
3rd place, bronze medalist(s)		Heinz Frei; Ursula Schwaller; Jean-Marc Berset	Switzerland

The mixed team relay cycling event at the 2012 Summer Paralympics took place on September 8 at Brands Hatch. The event consisted of riders in classes H1-4. Seven national teams competed. The race length was 18 km.

== Results ==
LAP=lapped

Rank	Team	Cyclists	Time
1st place, gold medalist(s)	United States	Matthew Updike (H2-M); Oscar Sanchez (H4-M); Marianna Davis (H2-W)	30:07
2nd place, silver medalist(s)	Italy	Vittorio Podesta (H2-M); Alex Zanardi (H4-M); Francesca Fenocchio (H2-W)	30:50
3rd place, bronze medalist(s)	Switzerland	Heinz Frei (H2-M); Ursula Schwaller (H2-W); Jean-Marc Berset (H2-M)	30:58
4	France	Joël Jeannot (H3-M); Rodolph Cecilon (H1-M); David Franek (H2-M)	31:44
5	Canada	Robert Labbe (H1-M); Mark Ledo (H3-M); Mark Beggs (H2-M)	34:07
6	Austria	Christoph Etzlstorfer (H1-M); Wolfgang Schattauer (H1-M); Walter Ablinger (H2-M)	LAP
7	Israel	Pascale Bercovitch (H4-W); Nati Groberg (H4-M); Koby Lion (H1-M)	LAP
