= Nikiema =

Nikiema is a surname of Burkinabé origin. Notable people with the surname include:

- Abdoul-Aziz Nikiema (born 1985), Burkinabé footballer
- Elisabeth Nikiema (born 1982), Burkinabé swimmer
- Issa Nikiema (born 1978), Burkinabé footballer
- Kadidia Nikiema, Burkinabé Paralympic cyclist
- Kilian Nikiema (born 2003), Burkinabé footballer
- Stéphane Nikiéma (born 1965), French kickboxer
- Victor Nikiema (born 1993), Burkinabé footballer
