= Lee Clayton (disambiguation) =

Lee Clayton (born 1942) is an American country-western musician.

Lee Clayton may also refer to:

- John Lee Clayton Jr. (born 1952), American jazz musician
- Lee Clayton (journalist) (born 1970), UK sports journalist
- Cecil Lee Clayton (died 2015), person executed in Missouri
- Lee Clayton, a character in Fugitive of the Judoon
- Robert E. Lee Clayton, a character in The Missouri Breaks
