= Cycling at the 2004 Summer Paralympics – Women's road time trial =

International sporting competition

Women's time trial LC1–4/CP 3/4 at the XII Paralympic Games
- Paralympic cycling (road)
- Venue: Vouliagmeni
- Dates: 24 September 2004
- Competitors: 12 from 8 nations

Medalists
1st place, gold medalist(s)		Karen Jacobsen	Denmark
2nd place, silver medalist(s)		Claire McLean	Australia
3rd place, bronze medalist(s)		Sara Tretola	Switzerland

The women's time trial LC1–4/CP 3/4 road event in cycling at the 2004 Summer Paralympics was competed on 24 September. It was won by Karen Jacobsen, representing Denmark. Standings were decided by a calculated time.

== Results ==
24 Sept. 2004, 15:30

Rank	Athlete	Real time	Factor%	Time	Notes
1st place, gold medalist(s)	Karen Jacobsen (DEN)	28:27.27	96.738	27:31.57	
2nd place, silver medalist(s)	Claire McLean (AUS)	27:39.95	100.000	27:39.95	
3rd place, bronze medalist(s)	Sara Tretola (SUI)	28:00.04	100.000	28:00.04	
4	Barbara Buchan (USA)	31:46.78	88.115	28:00.15	
5	Fiona Southorn (NZL)	28:24.73	100.000	28:24.73	
6	Allison Jones (USA)	31:11.26	92.020	28:41.93	
7	Zhou Jufang (CHN)	29:10.45	100.000	29:10.45	
8	An Feng Zhen (CHN)	29:55.60	100.000	29:55.60	
9	Tang Qi (CHN)	33:06.72	92.020	30:28.17	
10	Susan van Staden (RSA)	33:52.21	92.020	31:10.03	
11	Daniela Prochazkova (CZE)	37:20.01	96.738	36:06.94	
	Wang Jirong (CHN)	DNF			
