= Cycling at the 2012 Summer Paralympics – Women's 500 m time trial C4–5 =

Cycling, Women's 500m time trial C4-5 at the XIV Paralympic Games
- Venue: ExCeL Exhibition Centre
- Dates: September 1, 2012
- Competitors: 14 from 10 nations
- Winning time: 36.997

Medalists
1st place, gold medalist(s)		Sarah Storey	Great Britain
2nd place, silver medalist(s)		Jennifer Schuble	United States
3rd place, bronze medalist(s)		Ruan Jianping	China

The Women's 500m time trial, Classes 1-3 track cycling event at the 2012 Summer Paralympics took place on September 1 at London Velopark.

== Results ==
WR = World Record

Rank	Name	Country	Class	Factored Time
1st place, gold medalist(s)	Sarah Storey	Great Britain	C5	36.997
2nd place, silver medalist(s)	Jennifer Schuble	United States	C5	37.941
3rd place, bronze medalist(s)	Ruan Jianping	China	C4	38.194 WR
4	Anna Harkowska	Poland	C5	39.599
5	Greta Neimanas	United States	C5	39.621
6	Susan Powell	Australia	C4	39.702
7	Fiona Southorn	New Zealand	C5	41.796
8	Alexandra Green	Australia	C4	42.095
9	Megan Fisher	United States	C4	42.178
10	Marie-Claude Molnar	Canada	C4	42.228
11	Roxanne Burns	South Africa	C4	42.621
12	Kerstin Brachtendorf	Germany	C5	43.186
13	Annina Schillig	Switzerland	C5	43.248
14	Sara Tretola	Switzerland	C5	44.122
