= Burkina Faso at the 1996 Summer Paralympics =

- IPC code: BUR
- NPC: National Paralympic Committee Burkina Faso

in Atlanta
- Competitors: 3
- Medals: Gold 0 Silver 0 Bronze 0 Total 0

Summer Paralympics appearances (overview)
- 1992; 1996; 2000; 2004; 2008; 2012; 2016; 2020; 2024

Three male athletes from Burkina Faso competed at the 1996 Summer Paralympics in Atlanta, United States.

== Team ==
There were 0 female and 3 male athletes representing the country at the 1996 Summer Paralympics. Their participation numbers for Atlanta were one of their highest along with Barcelona. The following cycle, they sent 1 athlete. The country would be absent entirely from the 2004 Games in Athens.

== See also ==
- Burkina Faso at the Paralympics
- Burkina Faso at the 1996 Summer Olympics
