= Burkina Faso at the 2000 Summer Paralympics =

- IPC code: BUR
- NPC: National Paralympic Committee Burkina Faso

in Sydney
- Competitors: 1 in 1 sport
- Medals: Gold 0 Silver 0 Bronze 0 Total 0

Summer Paralympics appearances (overview)
- 1992; 1996; 2000; 2004; 2008; 2012; 2016; 2020; 2024

Burkina Faso competed at the 2000 Summer Paralympics. They were represented by one male athlete.

== Team ==
There were 0 female and 1 male athletes representing the country at the 2000 Summer Paralympics. Their participation numbers for Sydney were down from both Barcelona and Atlanta, when they had sent 3 athletes. The following games in Athens, the country would be absent entirely.

== See also ==
- 2000 Summer Paralympics

== Bibliography ==
- International Paralympic Committee (2000). "Appendix C: Athlete Numbers - By Delegation". Sydney 2000 Paralympic Games Post Games Report. Sydney.
