= Burkina Faso at the Paralympics =

- IPC code: BUR
- NPC: National Paralympic Committee Burkina Faso
- Medals: Gold 0 Silver 0 Bronze 0 Total 0

Summer appearances
- 1992; 1996; 2000; 2004; 2008; 2012; 2016; 2020; 2024

Burkina Faso made its Paralympic Games début at the 1992 Summer Paralympics in Barcelona, sending a tandem of cyclists, a judoka and a weightlifter. The country was represented by a cycling tandem and a powerlifter in 1996, and by a single powerlifter in 2000. Burkina Faso did not take part in the 2004 Games, but returned to the Paralympics in 2008, sending a single cyclist.

Burkina Faso has never taken part in the Winter Paralympics, and no Burkinabé competitor has ever won a Paralympic medal.

== Medal tables ==
=== Medals by Summer Games ===
Games	Athletes	Gold	Silver	Bronze	Total	Rank
1992 Barcelona	3	0	0	0	0	-
1996 Atlanta	3	0	0	0	0	-
2000 Sydney	1	0	0	0	0	-
2004 Athens	did not participate					
2008 Beijing	1	0	0	0	0	-
2012 London	2	0	0	0	0	-
2016 Rio de Janeiro	1	0	0	0	0	-
2020 Tokyo	2	0	0	0	0	-
2024 Paris	1	0	0	0	0	-
2028 Los Angeles	Future Event					
2032 Brisbane	Future Event					
Total		0	0	0	0	-

== See also ==
- Burkina Faso at the Olympics
