= Burkina Faso at the 1992 Summer Paralympics =

- IPC code: BUR
- NPC: National Paralympic Committee Burkina Faso

in Barcelona
- Competitors: 3 in 3 sports
- Medals: Gold 0 Silver 0 Bronze 0 Total 0

Summer Paralympics appearances (overview)
- 1992; 1996; 2000; 2004; 2008; 2012; 2016; 2020; 2024

Burkina Faso made its Paralympic Games début at the 1992 Summer Paralympics in Barcelona. The country was represented by a cycling tandem, a judoka and a powerlifter. Judoka Mathieu Thiombiano was also one member of the cycling pair; Burkina Faso's delegation thus consisted in three competitors. None of them won a medal.

== Team ==
The country made their debut at the 1992 Games in Barcelona. There were 3 male athletes representing the country at the 1992 Summer Paralympics. Their participation numbers for Atlanta were one of their highest along with Barcelona. The following cycle, they sent 1 athlete. The country would be absent entirely from the 2004 Games in Athens.

Burkina Faso was represented by a cycling tandem, a judoka and a powerlifter. Judoka Mathieu Thiombiano was also one member of the cycling pair. None of them won a medal.

== Cycling ==
In road cycling, in the men's tandem open, Djibril Ouedraogo and Mathieu Thiombiano failed to complete the race. In judo, Thiombiano took part in the up to 60 kg category. He defeated Veniamin Mitchourine (of the Unified Team) by ippon, in 1:46, but lost his other three matches, finishing joint last of his group. In weightlifting, Richard Kabore Issaka lifted 100 kg in the up to 75 kg category, finishing 8th out of 10.

== See also ==
- Burkina Faso at the Paralympics
- Burkina Faso at the 1992 Summer Olympics
