= Burkina Faso at the 2016 Summer Paralympics =

- IPC code: BUR
- NPC: National Paralympic Committee Burkina Faso

in Rio de Janeiro
- Competitors: 1 in 1 sports
- Flag bearer: Jacques Ouedraogo
- Medals: Gold 0 Silver 0 Bronze 0 Total 0

Summer Paralympics appearances (overview)
- 1992; 1996; 2000; 2004; 2008; 2012; 2016; 2020; 2024

Burkina Faso sent a delegation to compete at the 2016 Summer Paralympics in Rio de Janeiro, Brazil, from 7 to 18 September 2016. This was the country's sixth time competing at a Summer Paralympic Games after making its debut at the 1992 Summer Paralympics. Burkina Faso was represented by one athlete, Jacques Ouedraogo. He competed in one event, the men's 100 metres T54 competition, where he was eliminated in the heat stages because he was last in his heat and only the top two participants in a heat progressed to the semi-finals.

== Background ==
Burkina Faso made its sixth Paralympic Games appearance in Rio de Janeiro, with their Paralympic debut occurring twelve years prior at the 1992 Summer Paralympics in Barcelona. The country has never won a gold or silver medal before. The 2016 Summer Paralympics were held from 7–18 September 2016 with a total of 4,328 athletes representing 159 National Paralympic Committees taking part. Burkina Faso sent one athlete to the Rio Paralympic Games, Jacques Ouedraogo, who was selected to be the flag bearer during the parade of nations in the opening ceremony.

== Disability classifications ==
Every participant at the Paralympics has their disability grouped into one of five disability categories; amputation, the condition may be congenital or sustained through injury or illness; cerebral palsy; wheelchair athletes, there is often overlap between this and other categories; visual impairment, including blindness; Les autres, any physical disability that does not fall strictly under one of the other categories, for example dwarfism or multiple sclerosis. Each Paralympic sport then has its own classifications, dependent upon the specific physical demands of competition. Events are given a code, made of numbers and letters, describing the type of event and classification of the athletes competing. Some sports, such as athletics, divide athletes by both the category and severity of their disabilities, other sports, for example swimming, group competitors from different categories together, the only separation being based on the severity of the disability.

== Athletics ==
Jacques Ouedraogo competed in the Men's 100m - T54 event. In Round 1 Heat 2, he finished seventh in a time of 19.32. As only the top two in a heat could qualify to the semifinals, Ouedraogo was eliminated from the competition.

Men's Track

| Athlete | Events | Heat | | Semifinal | | Final | |
| Athlete | Events | Time | Rank | Time | Rank | Time | Rank |
|---|---|---|---|---|---|---|---|
| Jacques Ouedraogo | 100 m T54 | 19.32 | 7 | did not advance | | | |

== See also ==
- Burkina Faso at the 2016 Summer Olympics
