= Burkina Faso at the 2008 Summer Paralympics =

- IPC code: BUR
- NPC: National Paralympic Committee Burkina Faso

in Beijing
- Competitors: 1 in 1 sport
- Flag bearers: Lassane Gasbeogo (opening & closing)
- Medals Ranked -th: Gold 0 Silver 0 Bronze 0 Total 0

Summer Paralympics appearances (overview)
- 1992; 1996; 2000; 2004; 2008; 2012; 2016; 2020; 2024

Burkina Faso sent a delegation to compete at the 2008 Summer Paralympics in Beijing, People's Republic of China. According to official records, the country's only athlete competed in cycling.

== Cycling ==
Men

Time trials & Road races

Athlete	Class	Event	Time	Class Factor	Factorized Time	Rank
Lassane Gasbeogo	HC C	Road time trial	25:21.79 (+ 5:05.27)	-	-	11
Lassane Gasbeogo	HC C	Road race	1:44:09 (+ 22:29)	-	-	11

== See also ==
- Burkina Faso at the Paralympics
- Burkina Faso at the 2008 Summer Olympics
