= Cycling at the 2012 Summer Paralympics – Women's road time trial C5 =

Paralympic event results

Cycling, Women's road time trial C5 at the XIV Paralympic Games
- Venue: Brands Hatch
- Dates: September 5, 2012
- Competitors: 10 from 6 nations

Medalists
1st place, gold medalist(s)		Sarah Storey	Great Britain
2nd place, silver medalist(s)		Anna Harkowska	Poland
3rd place, bronze medalist(s)		Kelly Crowley	United States

The Women's time trial C5 road cycling event at the 2012 Summer Paralympics took place on September 5 at Brands Hatch. Ten riders from six different nations competed. The race distance was 16 km.

== Results ==
Rank	Name	Country	Time
1st place, gold medalist(s)	Sarah Storey	Great Britain	22:40.66
2nd place, silver medalist(s)	Anna Harkowska	Poland	24:14.94
3rd place, bronze medalist(s)	Kelly Crowley	United States	25:14.51
4	Greta Neimanas	United States	25:25.51
5	Fiona Southorn	New Zealand	26:00.81
6	Jennifer Schuble	United States	26:32.88
7	Kerstin Brachtendorf	Germany	26:34.61
8	Sara Tretola	Switzerland	27:07.57
9	Crystal Lane	Great Britain	27:33.44
10	Annina Schillig	Switzerland	28:40.72
