= Burkina Faso at the 2024 Summer Paralympics =

- Flag of Burkina Faso
- IPC code: BUR
- NPC: National Paralympic Committee Burkina Faso

in Paris, France August 28, 2024 – September 8, 2024
- Competitors: 1 (1 woman) in 1 sport
- Flag bearer: Rahinatou Mone
- Medals: Gold 0 Silver 0 Bronze 0 Total 0

Summer Paralympics appearances (overview)
- 1992; 1996; 2000; 2004; 2008; 2012; 2016; 2020; 2024

Burkina Faso competed at the 2024 Summer Paralympics in Paris, France, from 28 August to 8 September 2024. This was the nation's eighth time competing at the Summer Paralympic Games after it made its debut at the 1992 Summer Paralympics. The delegation consisted soley of Rahinatou Mone in athletics.

== Competitors ==
The following is the list of number of competitors in the Games.

Sport	Men	Women	Total
Athletics	0	1	1
Total	0	1	1

== Athletics ==
Athlete	Event	Semifinal		Final	
Athlete	Event	Result	Rank	Result	Rank
Rahinatou Mone	Women's 100 metres T13	13.86	7	Did not advance	

== See also ==
- Burkina Faso at the 2024 Summer Olympics
- Burkina Faso at the Paralympics
