= Karen Darke =

Paralympic cyclist and mountain climber

Medal record

Representing Great Britain

Women's road cycling

Paralympic Games
| Gold medal – first place | 2016 Rio | Road time trial H1-3 |
| Silver medal – second place | 2012 London | Road time trial H1-2 |

Women's Paratriathlon

World Championships
| Gold medal – first place | 2012 Auckland | TRI 1 |
| Silver medal – second place | 2013 London | TRI 1 |

European Championships
| Gold medal – first place | 2014 Kitzbühel | PT1 |
| Bronze medal – third place | 2017 Kitzbühel | PTWC |

Karen Darke MBE FRSGS (born 25 June 1971) is a British paralympic cyclist, paratriathlete, adventurer and author. She competed at the 2016 Rio Paralympics winning Gold in the Women's road time trial, following her success in the 2012 London Paralympics winning a silver medal in the Women's road time trial H1-2.

Darke was born in Halifax, Yorkshire. She is paralysed from the chest down following an accident, aged 21, whilst sea cliff climbing. In 1996 she first hand-cycled across the Himalaya from Kazakhstan to Pakistan, through the Indian Himalaya in 2005 and 2018, and across the Tibetan Plateau in 2014. In 2002 she was part of a team sea kayaking from Canada to Alaska (Vancouver to Juneau, 10 weeks kayaking). In 2006, she took part in an expedition which crossed Greenland's ice cap whilst sitting on skis using her arms and poles to cover the 372-mile crossing. She has also climbed Mont Blanc, Matterhorn and El Capitan and hand-cycled, skied and kayaked the length of Japan. In 2009, she was a bronze medal winner in the Para-Cycling World Cup after which, in 2010, she became a member of the British Para-Cycling team. She has won two silver medals in the women's H2 road race and time trial events at the 2011 Para-Cycling World Cup which took place in Sydney.

At the 2012 Summer Paralympics, on 5 September 2012, she won a silver medal in the Women's road time trial H1–2 finishing second to Marianna Davis in a time of 33:16.09. In the Women's road race H1-3 competition, on 7 September 2012, Darke finished fourth. After crossing the finishing line holding hands with teammate Rachel Morris, both in a time of 1:43:08, Morris was awarded the bronze medal.

In October 2012, she competed in her first ITU Paratriathlon World Championships. She won the gold medal in her TRI-1 classification. She went on to compete for Scotland in the 2018 Commonwealth Games, Gold Coast, Australia, finishing 4th.

In 2014 Darke took a silver medal in the UCI Para-Cycling Road World Championships in South Carolina in the H3 time-trial, following it up with a bronze in the H3 road race.

On 14 September 2016 Darke won the gold medal in the Women's time trial H1-3 at the Rio Paralympics in a time of 33:44:93.

Darke is an ambassador for World Jenny's Day, a non-profit charitable organisation that brings awareness to teen suicide, and looks to normalise conversations around mental health. For her part, Darke will be riding across the 'Rooftop of Africa' on specially designed hand-powered trikes in August 2023, as a World Jenny's Day fundraiser endorsed by UK Prime Minister Rishi Sunak.

Darke was appointed Member of the Order of the British Empire (MBE) in the 2017 New Year Honours for services to sport, particularly cycling and triathlon.

== Personal life ==
Darke graduated from the University of Leeds in 1992 with a degree in Chemistry and Geological Science. Darke has a doctorate in geology from the University of Aberdeen which she gained in 1996 and an MA from the University of Cumbria in development training and diplomas in performance coaching and traditional Chinese medicine. She has since studied a BA in Psychology and Spanish (Open University) and a Masters in Sports Psychology and High Performance Coaching at UNISPORT (Barcelona). Her long-term partner was the climber Andy Kirkpatrick.

She has honorary doctorate degrees from The University of Aberdeen, Abertay University in Dundee, another from the University of Leeds, and from the University of Cumbria, and from Sheffield Hallam University.

== Books ==
She has written three books:

- If You Fall (2006)
- Boundless (2012)
- Quest 79: Find your inner gold (2017)

== Websites ==
Personal webpage*
