= Athletics at the 2015 Parapan American Games – Women's 100 metres T38 =

Athletics – Women's 100 metres T38 at the 2015 Parapan American Games
- Venue: CIBC Athletics Stadium
- Dates: August 10
- Competitors: 6 from 3 nations

Medalists
1st place, gold medalist(s)		Veronica Silva Hipolito	Brazil
2nd place, silver medalist(s)		Jenifer Martins dos Santos	Brazil
3rd place, bronze medalist(s)		Lucia Muro	Mexico

The women's T38 (including T35 athletes) 100 metres competition of the athletics events at the 2015 Parapan American Games was held on August 10 at the CIBC Athletics Stadium. The defending Parapan American Games champion was Jenifer Santos of Brazil.

== Records ==
Prior to this competition, the existing records were as follows:

=== T35 ===
World record	Isis Holt (AUS)	14.16	Brisbane, Australia	March 28, 2015
Americas Record	Virginia McLachlan (CAN)	16.07	Lyon, France	July 22, 2013
Parapan Record	Virginia McLachlan (CAN)	16.74	Guadalajara, Mexico	November 17, 2011

=== T38 ===
World record	Sophie Hahn (GBR)	13.00	London, Great Britain	July 26, 2015
Americas Record	Veronica Hipolito (BRA)	13.12	Berlin, Germany	June 20, 2014
Parapan Record	Jenifer Santos (BRA)	14.63	Guadalajara, Mexico	November 17, 2011

== Schedule ==
All times are Central Standard Time (UTC-6).

Date	Time	Round
10 August	18:55	Final

== Results ==
All times are shown in seconds.

KEY:	q	Fastest non-qualifiers	Q	Qualified	PR	Parapan American Games record	AR	Area record	NR	National record	PB	Personal best	SB	Seasonal best	DSQ	Disqualified	FS	False start

=== Final ===
Athletes are classified as T38 unless indicated. Wind: -0.5 m/s

Rank	Name	Nation	Time	Notes
1st place, gold medalist(s)	Veronica Silva Hipolito	Brazil	13.29	PR
2nd place, silver medalist(s)	Jenifer Martins dos Santos	Brazil	14.14	
3rd place, bronze medalist(s)	Lucia Muro	Mexico	14.92	PB
4	Maria Zamora	Mexico	15.69	
5	Suzanne Arenal	United States	17.79	T35
6	Aubrey Headon	United States	18.63	PB, T35
