= Athletics at the 2012 Summer Paralympics – Women's 800 metres =

The Women's 800m athletics events for the 2012 Summer Paralympics took place at the London Olympic Stadium from 31 August to 8 September. A total of two events were contested over this distance for two different classifications.

== Results ==
=== T53 ===
The T53 category is for wheelchair athletes with normal use of arms and hands, no or limited trunk function, and no leg function.

The event consisted of a single race. Results:

Rank	Athlete	Country	Time	Notes
1st place, gold medalist(s)	Zhou Hongzhuan	China	1:52.85	PR
2nd place, silver medalist(s)	Huang Lisha	China	1:53.10	PB
3rd place, bronze medalist(s)	Jessica Galli	United States	1:53.12	
4	Madison de Rozario	Australia	1:53.65	
5	Angela Ballard	Australia	1:53.80	
6	Shirley Reilly	United States	1:54.18	
7	Amanda McGrory	United States	1:54.48	

=== T54 ===
The T54 category is for wheelchair athletes with no leg function, but near full arm function and reasonable to normal trunk function. Typically this may be caused by a lower spinal cord injury or spinal cord birth defect.

The event consisted of 3 heats and a final. Results of final:

Rank	Athlete	Country	Time	Notes
1st place, gold medalist(s)	Tatyana McFadden	United States	1:47.01	
2nd place, silver medalist(s)	Edith Wolf	Switzerland	1:49.87	SB
3rd place, bronze medalist(s)	Zou Lihong	China	1:50.31	PB
4	Dong Hongjiao	China	1:50.62	PB
5	Manuela Schaer	Switzerland	1:50.90	
6	Liu Wenjun	China	1:51.34	
7	Diane Roy	Canada	1:54.90	
8	Christie Dawes	Australia	1:58.77	
