= Cycling at the 2012 Summer Paralympics – Women's individual pursuit C5 =

Women's individual pursuit C5 at the XIV Paralympic Games
- Venue: London Velopark
- Date: 30 August 2012
- Competitors: 10 from 6 nations

Medalists
| 1st place, gold medalist(s) | | Sarah Storey | Great Britain |
| 2nd place, silver medalist(s) | | Anna Harkowska | Poland |
| 3rd place, bronze medalist(s) | | Fiona Southorn | New Zealand |

The Women's Individual C5 Pursuit took place on 30 August 2012 at the London Velopark.

The event began with a qualifying race over 3000m. Each of the ten athletes competed individually in a time-trial basis. The fastest two riders raced for the gold medal and the third- and fourth-fastest riders raced for the bronze.

== Preliminaries ==
Q = Qualifier WR = World record

| Rank | Name | Country | Time |
|---|---|---|---|
| 1 | Sarah Storey | Great Britain | 3:32.170 Q WR |
| 2 | Anna Harkowska | Poland | 3:48.885 Q |
| 3 | Fiona Southorn | New Zealand | 3:52.695 Q |
| 4 | Crystal Lane | Great Britain | 3:59.220 Q |
| 5 | Jennifer Schuble | United States | 4:00.702 |
| 6 | Kelly Crowley | United States | 4:02.825 |
| 7 | Greta Neimanas | United States | 4:03.200 |
| 8 | Kerstin Brachtendorf | Germany | 4:12.245 |
| 9 | Sara Tretola | Switzerland | 4:14.950 |
| 10 | Annina Schillig | Switzerland | 4:21.481 |

== Finals ==
Gold medal match

| Name | Time | Rank |
|---|---|---|
| Sarah Storey (GBR) | caught opponent | 1st place, gold medalist(s) |
| Anna Harkowska (POL) | | 2nd place, silver medalist(s) |

Bronze medal match

| Name | Time | Rank |
|---|---|---|
| Fiona Southorn (NZL) | 3:55.867 | 3rd place, bronze medalist(s) |
| Crystal Lane (GBR) | 4:02.773 | 4 |
