= Kadeena Cox =

British paralympic athlete (born 1991)

Kadeena Cox OBE
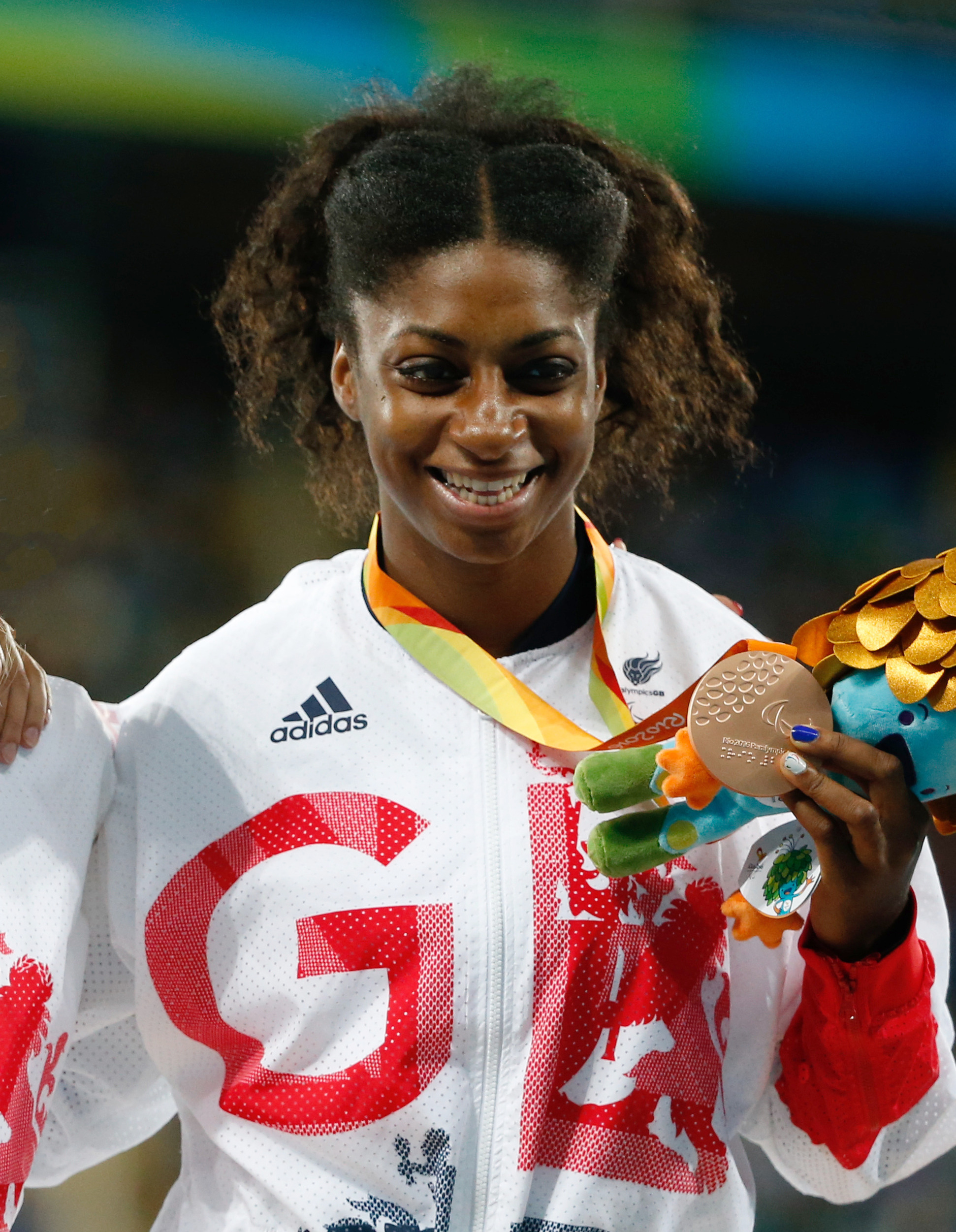
- Cox at the 2016 Paralympics

Personal information
- Born: 10 March 1991 (age 35) Leeds, West Yorkshire, England

Sport
- Country: Great Britain
- Sport: Athletics, cycling
- Disability class: T38, C4
- Events: T38 sprint, C4 para-cycling
- Club: Sale Harriers
- Coached by: Joseph McDonnell

Achievements and titles
- Highest world ranking: 1st – 100 m (T37); 1st – 400m WR (T38)
- Personal bests: 100m sprint: 12.98s 200m sprint: 27.15s 400m sprint: 1:00.71
Medal record
Representing Great Britain
Women's para athletics
Paralympic Games
Gold medal – first place	2016 Rio	400 m – T38
Silver medal – second place	2016 Rio	4 × 100 m – T35-38
Bronze medal – third place	2016 Rio	100 m – T38
World Championships
Gold medal – first place	2015 Doha	100 m – T37
Gold medal – first place	2015 Doha	4 × 100 m – T35-38
Gold medal – first place	2017 London	400 m – T38
Silver medal – second place	2017 London	100 m – T38
Bronze medal – third place	2017 London	200 m – T38
European Championships
Bronze medal – third place	2016 Grosseto	200 m – T38
Women's para cycling
Paralympic Games
Gold medal – first place	2016 Rio	C4-5 time trial
Gold medal – first place	2020 Tokyo	C4-5 time trial
Gold medal – first place	2020 Tokyo	Mixed team sprint C1–5
Gold medal – first place	2024 Paris	Mixed team sprint C1–5
Track World Championships
Gold medal – first place	2016 Montichiari	500 m time trial C4
Gold medal – first place	2022 Saint-Quentin-en-Yvelines	500 m time trial C4
Gold medal – first place	2023 Glasgow	500 m time trial C4
Gold medal – first place	2024 Rio de Janeiro	500 m time trial C4
Gold medal – first place	2026 Apeldoorn	Time trial C4
Gold medal – first place	2026 Apeldoorn	Sprint C4
Silver medal – second place	2020 Milton	500 m time trial C4
Silver medal – second place	2023 Glasgow	Mixed team sprint C1–5
Silver medal – second place	2025 Rio de Janeiro	1 km time trial C4
Silver medal – second place	2025 Rio de Janeiro	Sprint C4
Silver medal – second place	2025 Rio de Janeiro	Mixed team sprint C1–5
Silver medal – second place	2026 Apeldoorn	Mixed team sprint C1–5

Kadeena Cox (born 10 March 1991) is a parasport athlete competing in T38 para-athletics sprint events and C4 para-cycling and British television presenter. She was part of the 2015 IPC Athletics World Championships and the 2016 UCI Para-cycling Track World Championships, in which she won world titles in the T37 100m and C4 500m time trial respectively.

Competing for Great Britain at the 2016 Summer Paralympics, in both athletics and cycling, she won a bronze medal in the 100 metres T38 sprint, before winning a gold medal in the time trial C4-5 cycling event, and another gold in the 400 metres T38 sprint, becoming the first British Paralympian to win golds in multiple sports at the same Games since Isabel Barr at the 1984 Summer Paralympics.

In 2021 she appeared as a contestant on ITV's I'm a Celebrity...Get Me Out of Here!. In September 2021, Cox was the winner of the sixteenth series of BBC's Celebrity MasterChef.

== Early and personal life ==
Cox was born on 10 March 1991 in Leeds, West Yorkshire, England to Jamaican parents who had migrated to Britain. Her first school was Bracken Edge Primary in Chapeltown, Leeds. She attended Wetherby High School before going to Manchester Metropolitan University where she studied physiotherapy.

== Sporting career ==
=== As a non-disabled athlete ===
Cox began sprinting competitively at the age of 15 after her hockey coach suggested she try the sport. Over the next three years she competed at regional under-17 meets gaining several podium finishes in the 100m events. In 2007, she added the 60m and 200m to her repertoire, taking bronze in the U17 events at both the Manchester Open and the England Athletics Open Championships in the 60m that year. By 2009 Cox was competing throughout the athletics season, recording personal bests of 12.60s in the 100m and 25.58s in the 200m, both at the Yorkshire & Humberside County Championships. In 2012 Cox was entering national events and recorded a new personal best in the 200m in the BUCS Championships held at the Olympic Park, a result which saw her take bronze. In 2013, she broke the 12 second barrier in the 100m for the first time, recording a time of 11.97 at the Northern Athletics Championships. She subsequently set a personal best of 11.93s for the 100m the same year. In addition to running, before her illness Cox was vying for a place on the British skeleton team.

On 18 May 2014, Cox entered the Loughborough International: two days later she was rushed to hospital after showing odd symptoms and was diagnosed as having a stroke. After two months of physiotherapy she recovered back to normal health and began training again. Then on 15 September 2014, she experienced burning sensations in her right arm, which over the following few days worsened to numbness in her arm and right leg and she was again taken to hospital with suspicions of a stroke. After extensive tests, she was diagnosed with multiple sclerosis.

=== As a parasport sprinter ===
Intent on making the 2016 Summer Paralympics in Rio, Cox was classified as both a T37 track and field athlete, to continuing her sprinting career, and a C2 track cyclist.

A month later, Cox was selected for the Great Britain athletics team to compete at the 2015 IPC Athletics World Championships in Doha, where she entered the T37 100m and 200m sprints. In the heats leading up to the final of the 100m sprint, Cox posted a time of 13.59s to beat the world record set by France's Mandy Francois-Elie. Later that day she ran in the 100m T37 final, taking the gold medal in a time of 13:60, beating teammate Georgina Hermitage into second place. Her final event of the championship, the T37 200m sprint, ended in controversy after she missed registration by a minute and was disqualified from the race.

In June 2016, after securing a place at the 2016 Summer Paralympics as a T37 athlete, Cox was reclassified as a T38 category athlete, a classification for less-disabled athletes. This threw her hopes to race at Rio into jeopardy as Britain already fielded two other athletes, Sophie Hahn and Olivia Breen, who had posted faster times as T38 sprinters. Despite the classification change, Cox was selected for the Rio Paralympics in July 2016. At the Games she took a gold in the T38 400m, a silver in the T35-38 4 × 100 m relay and a bronze in the T38 100m. She also set a new world record of 1:00.71 to take the gold medal in the T38 400m. Cox was subsequently selected as the flag-bearer for the British team at the closing ceremony.

A late addition to the GB squad, Cox competed in the T38 400m at the delayed 2020 Summer Paralympics in Tokyo. She finished 4th with a time of 1:01.16, her season best.

=== As a para-cyclist ===
In September 2015, Cox entered the British National Track Championships where she took the gold medal in the C1-5 Mixed Gender Sprint Time Trial.

In March 2016, Cox represented Great Britain at the UCI Para-cycling Track World Championships in Montichiari. Despite being reclassified as a C4 cyclist the day before the event, she still went on to win gold in the 500m time trial with a world record of 37.456s. On 1 August, Cox was named in the Great Britain team to compete at the Rio Paralympics with the potential to race in the 500m time trial (C4/C5) and the road race (C4/C5). Cox won gold in the 500m time trial in the 2016 Paralympics: her time of 34.598 seconds also set a new world record. At the delayed Tokyo Paralympics, Cox defended her time trial title, again winning gold in a world record time of 34.812 seconds.

In 2024's Paralympics in Paris, France, Cox won gold with British team mates Jaco van Gass and Jody Cundy, in the C1-5 750m team sprint.

At the 2025 UCI Para-cycling Track World Championships in Rio de Janeiro, Cox won three silver medals: in the women's C4 1 km time trial, the women's C4 sprint, and the mixed C1–5 team sprint alongside Jody Cundy and Fin Graham.

== Awards and honours ==
Cox was appointed Member of the Order of the British Empire (MBE) in the 2017 New Year Honours for services to athletics and Officer of the Order of the British Empire (OBE) in the 2022 New Year Honours for services to athletics and cycling.

In March 2017, Cox was awarded the Sporting Equals Sportswoman of the Year at the Lycamobile British Ethnic Diversity Sports Awards (BEDSAs) held at the London Hilton on Park Lane.

On 5 June 2022, Cox, riding a cycle alongside Sir Chris Hoy, headed "The Time of Our Lives" section of the Platinum Jubilee Pageant.

Cox's name is one of those featured on the sculpture Ribbons, unveiled in 2024.

== Media appearances ==
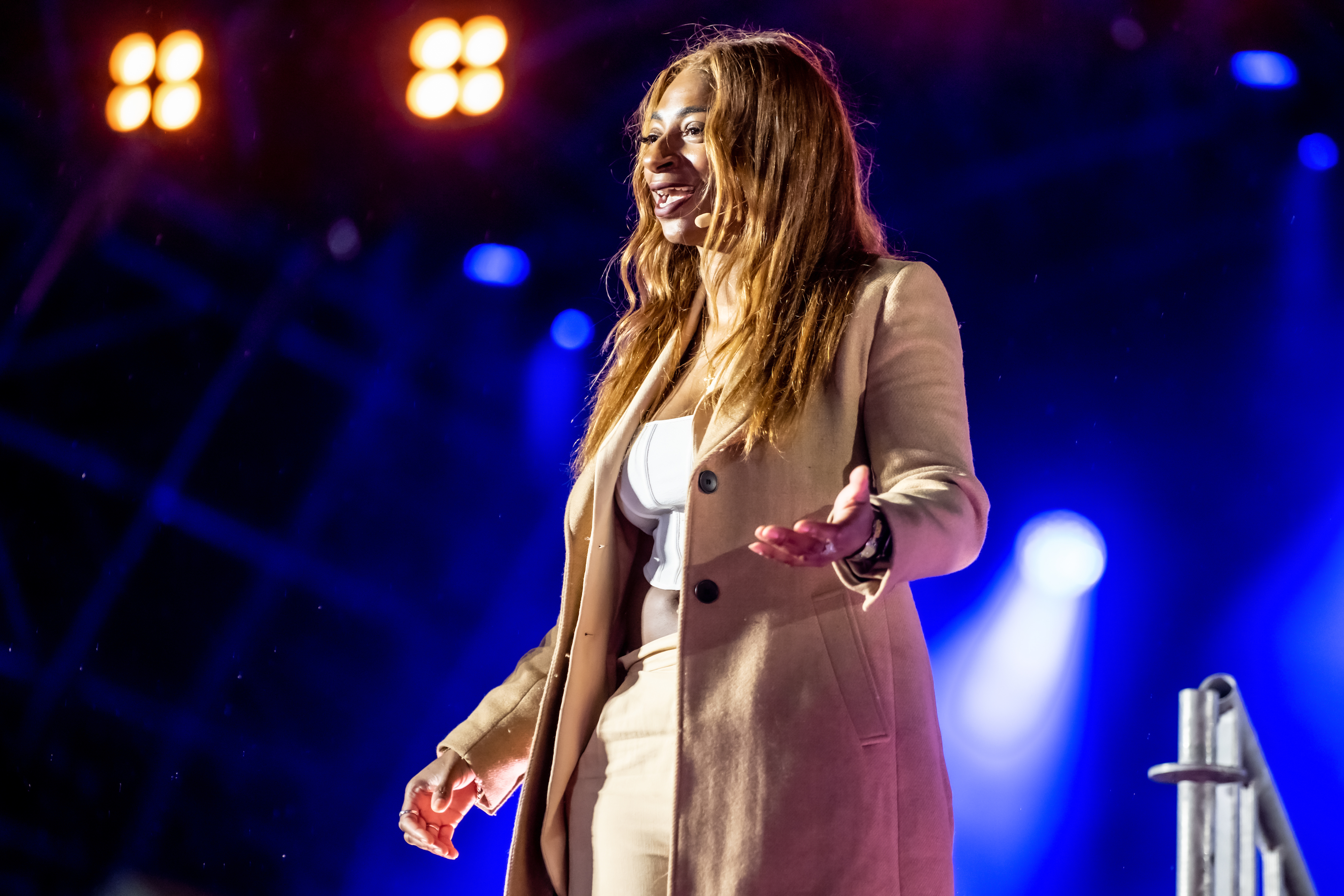
Cox on stage at The Awakening, for LEEDS 2023

She appeared on Celebrity Mastermind in December 2016, scoring just 3 points with her specialist subject Arsenal F.C., and no points at all in the general knowledge round. This is the lowest ever score. She won the second Celebrity Robot Wars 2016 episode later that month with her collaboration with Ellis Ware (who drove Pulsar in the preceding regular series), with a robot called Kadeena Machina, a robot with a vertical disc, which won all four of its fights, the only robot to do so.

In 2017, she took part in the British television winter sports show The Jump, but had her funding suspended while on the show due to the number of injuries contestants sometimes have. In April 2018, Cox took part in The Great Stand Up to Cancer Bake Off on Channel 4 in aid of Stand Up to Cancer. In 2021, she appeared on Celebrity Gogglebox with fellow athlete Adam Gemili, and returned in 2024 with paralympic athlete Lauren Steadman. In September 2021, Cox won the sixteenth series of BBC's Celebrity MasterChef, beating Joe Swash and Megan McKenna.

In November 2021, Cox was announced as a contestant on the twenty-first series of I'm a Celebrity...Get Me Out of Here!. She was second to be eliminated. Then in June 2022, Cox made a cameo appearance in an episode of the BBC soap opera Doctors. On 7 January 2023, Cox appeared on stage in The Awakening, the inaugural event for LEEDS 2023, a year-long cultural festival in the city. On 24 January 2025, she appeared on Would I Lie To You?.
