= Athletics at the 2016 Summer Paralympics – Women's 400 metres T38 =

Women's 400 metres T38 at the XV Paralympic Games
- Venue: Estádio Olímpico João Havelange
- Dates: 14 September 2016
- Competitors: 7 from 7 nations

Medalists
1st place, gold medalist(s)		Kadeena Cox	Great Britain
2nd place, silver medalist(s)		Junfei Chen	China
3rd place, bronze medalist(s)		Veronica Hipolito	Brazil

The T38 category is for ambulant athletes with cerebral palsy. T38 athletes have the mildest form of impairment caused by cerebral palsy, often in only one limb, and not affecting the ability to run, walk or jump freely, although impairing performance. T38 athletes may suffer minor co-ordination difficulties.

The Athletics at the 2016 Summer Paralympics – Women's 400 metres T38 event at the 2016 Paralympic Games took place on 14 September 2016, at the Estádio Olímpico João Havelange.

== Final ==
11:17 14 September 2016:

Rank	Lane	Bib	Name	Nationality	Reaction	Time	Notes
1st place, gold medalist(s)	7	327	Kadeena Cox	Great Britain		1:00.71	
2nd place, silver medalist(s)	5	160	Junfei Chen	China		1:01.34	
3rd place, bronze medalist(s)	3	106	Veronica Hipolito	Brazil		1:03.14	
4	8	43	Torita Isaac	Australia		1:04.47	
5	2	836	Sonia Mansour	Tunisia		1:04.91	
6	6	706	Maria Fernandes	Portugal		1:08.62	
7	4	477	Yuka Takamatsu	Japan		1:11.64	
