= Cycling at the 2012 Summer Paralympics – Women's road race C4–5 =

Cycling, Women's road race C4-5 at the XIV Paralympic Games
- Venue: Brands Hatch
- Dates: September 6, 2012
- Competitors: 15 from 9 nations

Medalists
1st place, gold medalist(s)		Sarah Storey	Great Britain
2nd place, silver medalist(s)		Anna Harkowska	Poland
3rd place, bronze medalist(s)		Kelly Crowley	United States

The Women's road race C4-5 cycling event at the 2012 Summer Paralympics took place on September 6 at Brands Hatch. Fifteen riders from nine different nations competed. The race distance was 64 km.

== Results ==
DNF = Did Not Finish

Rank	Name	Country	Class	Time
1st place, gold medalist(s)	Sarah Storey	Great Britain	C5	1:40:36
2nd place, silver medalist(s)	Anna Harkowska	Poland	C5	1:47:58
3rd place, bronze medalist(s)	Kelly Crowley	United States	C5	1:48:34
4	Kerstin Brachtendorf	Germany	C5	1:51:15
5	Jennifer Schuble	United States	C5	1:54:50
6	Crystal Lane	Great Britain	C5	1:54:50
7	Annina Schillig	Switzerland	C5	1:55:43
8	Greta Neimanas	United States	C5	1:55:57
9	Susan Powell	Australia	C4	1:56:12
10	Fiona Southorn	New Zealand	C5	1:57:05
11	Ruan Jianping	China	C4	1:57:17
12	Sara Tretola	Switzerland	C5	1:57:19
13	Marie-Claude Molnar	Canada	C4	1:58:44
	Alexandra Green	Australia	C4	DNF
	Megan Fisher	United States	C4	DNF
