= Burkina Faso at the 2012 Summer Paralympics =

- IPC code: BUR
- NPC: National Paralympic Committee Burkina Faso

in London
- Competitors: 2 in 1 sport
- Flag bearer: Kadidia Nikiema
- Medals: Gold 0 Silver 0 Bronze 0 Total 0

Summer Paralympics appearances (overview)
- 1992; 1996; 2000; 2004; 2008; 2012; 2016; 2020; 2024

Burkina Faso sent a delegation to the 2012 Summer Paralympics in London, United Kingdom, from 29 August to 9 September 2012. This was the country's fifth appearance at a Summer Paralympic Games. The Burkinese delegation to London consisted of two athletes, Lassane Gasbeogo and Kadidia Nikiema, who competed in wheelchair cycling at the Brands Hatch race circuit in Kent. Neither athlete won any medals in their respective events, with the best finish of Burkina Faso at these Paralympics coming from Nikiema in the women's road trial H3 race with a sixth-place result.

== Background ==
=== Preview ===
Burkina Faso made its debut in the Paralympic movement at the 1992 Summer Paralympics in Barcelona. Except for the 2004 Summer Paralympics, the country has competed in every Summer Paralympic Games since, making London its fifth appearance in the quadrennial event. Burkina Faso had not won any Paralympic medals entering the London Games, and has yet to debut in the Winter Paralympic Games. The 2012 Summer Paralympics were held from 29 August to 9 September 2012 with a total of 4,237 athletes representing 164 National Paralympic Committees. Wheelchair cyclists Lassane Gasbeogo and Kadidia Nikiema were the two athletes sent by Burkina Faso to compete at the Games. Nikiema was selected as the flag bearer for the parade of nations during the opening ceremony.

=== Preparations ===
The five-person team, comprising the athletes, a trainer, a physiotherapist, and chef de mission Florentine Ouedraogo, arrived at Gatwick Airport from Burkina Faso on 6 August. A government grant to pay for their residential and training expenses had not materialised due to a mix-up, and the delegation were stranded in the airport. This caused meet-and-greet volunteer and student Liam Conlon to take the male delegates to his home in Abridge, Essex; the women resided with local nuns in Brentwood after they were unable to stay in the accommodation arranged through Kent County Council. Burkina Faso thus avoided having to withdraw from the Paralympics due to funding concerns, unlike Malawi and Botswana. Conlon then persuaded Brentwood School to allow the athletes to use its running track for free. Their handcycle was subsequently deemed to be in non-compliance with Paralympic specifications and the team contacted suppliers from the United Kingdom and overseas since they lacked time to do fundraising. The Birmingham-based cycling and therapy retailer Quest 88, sold a replacement cycle at cost, and paid to ship it from France.

Both athletes were well received within the Brentwood community. They developed a more permanent relationship with Brentwood School, with its pupils and teachers organising a non-uniform day, dressing up in the colours of the flag of Burkina Faso as a mark of respect and to raise capital for the team. Conlon spoke of the reception the team received in Brentwood, "I had no idea how much of a community there was in the UK before they arrived, there were so many people involved in helping them, and the athletes loved everyone they met. Wherever they went there was a mob of people wanting to take photographs, and everyone welcomed the team with open arms.”

== Disability classification ==
Every participant at the Paralympics has their disability grouped into one of five disability categories: amputation, which may be congenital or sustained through injury or illness; cerebral palsy; wheelchair athletes, though there is often overlap between this and other categories; visual impairment, including blindness; and Les Autres, which is any physical disability that does not fall strictly under one of the other categories, like dwarfism or multiple sclerosis. Each Paralympic sport then has its own classifications, dependent upon the specific physical demands of competition. Events are given a code, made of numbers and letters, describing the type of event and classification of the athletes competing. Some sports, such as athletics, divide athletes by both the category and severity of their disabilities. Other sports, for example swimming, group competitors from different categories together, the only separation being based on the severity of the disability.

== Road cycling ==
Both of Burkina Faso's athletes competed in road cycling events at the Brands Hatch race track in Kent from 5 to 8 September. They shared a handcycle since the delegation's resources were limited.

=== Men ===
Gasbeogo was 26 years old and the youngest athlete to represent Burkina Faso at the Games. He had previously competed for Burkina Faso at the 2008 Summer Paralympics in Beijing. Gasbeogo contracted polio at the age of two and was classified H4 by the International Paralympic Committee (IPC). H4 is explained as a paraplegic who has "No lower limb function or limited function" or "Normal or almost normal trunk stability". He commented on his prospects in the Games, "The problem in Beijing is the equipment we had just wasn't good enough, but the bike we have now is much better We are just a small team – there are only two of us competing – but we are so proud to be representing our country." He took part in the 16 km (9.9 mi) men's time trial H4 event on 5 September. Gasbeogo finished in tenth and last position with a time of 34 minutes and 28.49 seconds and averaging 27.846 km/h (17.303 mph). Two days later, he competed in the 64 km (40 mi) men's road race H4 competition. Gasbeogo was lapped during the seventh and final lap of the race by eventual gold medallist Alex Zanardi—at the time, approximately 24 minutes ahead of Gasbeogo—and was not classified with a Did Not Finish as a result.

=== Women ===
At the age of 32, Nikiema was making her Paralympic debut at the London Summer Games and had won an African championship in 2009. Nikiema contracted polio when she was four years old and is paralysed in her right leg. She was classified H3 by the IPC. H3 is described as athletes that have "very limited trunk stability" which includes an "impaired sympathetic nerve system". Before the Games, Nikiema said her team owed a lot to those in England who helped her team, and said she was delighted to compete against other nations at the Paralympics for the first time. On 5 September, she competed in the 16 km (9.9 mi) women's road time trial H3 race. Nikiema finished the event in a time of 43 minutes and 15.64 seconds and averaging 22.191 km/h (13.789 mph). This put her in sixth place out of eight cyclists. Nikiema later competed in the 48 km (30 mi) women's road race H1–3 on 7 September. She was lapped on the final lap of the five-lap race by eventual gold medallist Marianna Davis. Nikiema was classified in 12th position out of 13 finishers with a Did Not Finish in the final results.

=== Road ===
Athletes	Event	Time	Rank
Lassane Gasbeogo	Men's time trial H4	34:28.49	10
Lassane Gasbeogo	Men's road race H4	LAP	
Kadidia Nikiema	Women's time trial H3	43:15.64	6
Kadidia Nikiema	Women's road race H1-3	LAP	

== See also ==
- Burkina Faso at the 2012 Summer Olympics
