= Burkina Faso at the 2020 Summer Paralympics =

- Flag of Burkina Faso
- IPC code: BUR

in Tokyo, Japan August 24, 2021 – September 5, 2021
- Competitors: 2 (1 man and 1 woman) in 1 sport
- Medals: Gold 0 Silver 0 Bronze 0 Total 0

Summer Paralympics appearances (overview)
- 1992; 1996; 2000; 2004; 2008; 2012; 2016; 2020; 2024

Burkina Faso competed at the 2020 Summer Paralympics in Tokyo, Japan, from 24 August to 5 September 2021. This was their fourth consecutive appearance at the Summer Paralympics since 2008 and their seventh overall.

== Competitors ==
The following is the list of number of competitors participating in the Games:

Sport	Men	Women	Total
Athletics	1	1	2

== Athletics ==
Men's track

Athlete	Event	Heats		Final	
Athlete	Event	Result	Rank	Result	Rank
Ferdinand Compaoré	100m T13	DQ	DID NOT ADVANCE	DID NOT ADVANCE	DID NOT ADVANCE

Men's field

Athlete	Event	Final	
Athlete	Event	Result	Rank
Ferdinand Compaoré	Long jump T13	4.98	8

Women's field

Athlete	Event	Final	
Athlete	Event	Result	Rank
Kouilibi Victorine Guissou	Shot put F57	6.25	12

== See also ==
- Burkina Faso at the Paralympics
- Burkina Faso at the 2020 Summer Olympics
