= Martine Wright =

British sitting volleyball player (born 1972)

Martine Wright MBE
Great Britain
- League: Paralympics

Personal information
- Born: 30 September 1972 (age 54) London

Career information
- College: East London
- Playing career: 2007–present

Career highlights
- 2012 BBC Sports Personality Helen Rollason Award

Martine Wiltshire, MBE (née Wright; born 30 September 1972) is a British sitting volleyball player.

Wright, who was born in London, lost both of her legs in the Aldgate underground explosion in the 7/7 London bombings in 2005. She lost 80% of the blood in her body and was in a coma for ten days and had to undergo ten months of surgeries following the injury.

As part of her rehabilitation she played wheelchair tennis before focusing on sitting volleyball. Wright was an initial member of the Great Britain women's squad which began playing together in late 2009, making her debut at the 2010 Kent International tournament against Paralympic Champions, China. In July 2012 she was picked to represent Great Britain's women's sitting volleyball team at the sitting volleyball event in the 2012 Summer Paralympics.

Wright was made a Member of the Order of the British Empire (MBE) in the 2016 Birthday Honours for services to sport.

== Personal life ==
Wright gained a degree in Psychology and Communication Studies from the University of East London in 1996. After the 7/7 bombings she campaigned for better compensation for victims of the bombings and their families and has been an ambassador for sport for disabled people.
