= Monica Bascio =

American Paralympic cyclist and skier

Personal information
- Born: September 16, 1969 (age 56) Massapequa, New York
- Education: San Jose State University
- Occupation: Occupational Therapist
- Website: https://blog.monicabascio.net/

Sport
- Country: United States
- Sport: Cycling, cross-country skiing, biathlon
Medal record
Representing United States
Women's Para-cycling
Paralympic Games
Silver medal – second place	2012 London	Road time trial H3
Silver medal – second place	2012 London	Road race H1-3
Parapan American Games
Gold medal – first place	2011 Guadalajara	Road race H3-4

Monica Bascio (born September 16, 1969) is an American Paralympic cross-country skier, biathlete, and handcyclist. Making her Paralympic debut at the Paralympic Winter Games Torino 2006, she has competed in a total of four Paralympic Games. At London 2012, Bascio secured two silver medals in handcycling. She was named the United States Olympic Committee’s Paralympic Sportswoman of the Year in 2013.

Following her retirement after Paralympic Winter Games Sochi 2014, Bascio was diagnosed with colon cancer later that year. She went through surgery and chemotherapy treatment and has been cancer free since April 2015.

In September 2016, she was elected to the International Paralympic Committee Athletes' Council, where she works to be a voice and an advocate for Paralympic athletes all over the world. In 2018, Monica was appointed to the IOC Athlete's Entourage Commission, and was also invited to serve on the Adaptive Spirit board of directors.

== Early life and education ==
Bascio was born in Massapequa, New York. In 1992, Bascio had an accident while skiing which caused her to become a paraplegic. She moved to California after her accident, earning a degree in occupational therapy from San Jose State University in 1998.

== Competition ==
At the IPC World Handcycle Championships in 2002, she won a gold medal for cycling in the individual time trial and a silver for the road race.

After five years on the U.S. handcycling team, she took up Nordic skiing in 2002 and began competing in the world cup circuit 2004. Bascio competed at the Paralympic Winter Games Torino 2006, where she finished fifth in the 10-kilometer cross-country race and fourth in the sprint biathlon race. Bascio placed second overall in the IPC Nordic Skiing World Cup in 2009 after winning the bronze in the 5k Paralympic Test Event at Whistler Olympic Park.

In 2011 Bascio won the overall title for the UCI Para-cycling Road World Cup and won the world title for both the time trial and road race at the UCI Para-cycling Road World Championships.

In 2012, Bascio won two silver medals in the individual time trial and road race at the Paralympic Games London 2012.

Bascio won every UCI Para-cycling competition she entered in 2013, and again won the overall world cup titles and the world championship titles in both the road race and time trial.

== Doping case ==
On May 26, 2012, during urine testing, the Union Cycliste Internationale (UCI) found tuaminoheptane, a banned substance that she was using prior to the UCI Para-cycling Road World Cup event which started a day before the test. She accepted a 3-month ban from the United States Anti-Doping Agency for an unintentional anti-doping rule violation and was stripped from her awards and prizes due to the violation. She apologized, and was reinstated for competition on August 26, the day before she traveled to the 2012 London Paralympic Games.

== Personal life ==
Bascio resides in Colorado Springs, Colorado, with her husband Ian and son. She has worked as an occupational therapist specialising in older people. Bascio was elected to the IPC Athlete's Council in 2016. In 2018 she was appointed to the IOC Athlete's Entourage Commission and invited to serve as part of the Adaptive Spirit Board of Directors.
