= Mitchell Todd =

Scottish rugby union player

- Born: 15 March 1991 Solihull
- Died: 15 August 2012 (aged 21) near Normanton-on-the-Wolds
- Height: 1.93 m (6 ft 4 in)
- Weight: 110 kg (240 lb; 17 st 5 lb)

Rugby union career
- Position: Lock
Senior career
Years	Team	Apps	(Points)
-2012	Nottingham		
International career
Years	Team	Apps	(Points)
2011	Scotland U20s	10	

Mitchell Todd (15 March 1991 – 15 August 2012) was a Scottish rugby union player who played at lock for Nottingham. Todd died following a car accident near Normanton-on-the-Wolds on 15 August 2012. Nottingham released a statement confirming his death.

He completed a degree in Sports Therapy at the University of Coventry and previously played for Leicester Lions.
