= Lee Clayton (journalist) =

English journalist

- Born: 1970-present
- Occupation: Sports Journalist
- Years active: 1986

Lee Clayton (born 1970) is an English sports journalist and media consultant who is the Founder Director of Claymaker Media Ltd and former Global Publisher of Sport at the Daily Mail & General Trust, which publishes the Daily Mail, Mail on Sunday and MailOnline. He was also formerly Head of Talksport radio He is an avid West Ham supporter and season ticket holder and co-authored Farewell to Upton Park: The Official Celebration of West Ham United's home 1904–2016.

Aged 16 he joined The Sun in the mail room, before being offered a role on the sports desk, despite never attaining any formal journalistic qualifications. He attended Brampton Manor Comprehensive School in East London and joined News International in 1986. In 1987, he appeared in The News, the in-house newspaper, as one of "News International’s Rising Stars".

He joined the Sunday Mirror in 1994 before becoming chief football writer on the Daily Star later that year. He became sports editor of the Sunday People in 1999 before joining The Daily Mail in 2004, where he spent 14 years as group head of sport and won numerous awards.

In his first 18 months as head of Talksport he was praised by the Sports Journalist Association as the station won the 'Sports Network of the Year' award for “making a number of innovative changes in this past year to diversify their audience and enhance their credibility”.

In 2026 Clayton created Claymaker Media and is the Founding Director of the company, which exists to provide Media Solutions, Reputational Management, Crisis Communications, Brand Amplification and Product Engagement.

Clayton contributed to the Debrett's 500 list in 2014 and 2015 and was on the judging panel for the 2012 BBC Sports Personality of the Year. He also contributed to the novel Forgive Us Our Press Passes.

He has appeared on various television programmes including Sky Sports' Soccer Saturday, Hold the Back Page, Dream Team and BBC's pilot episode of Match of the Day Two. In radio broadcasting he has presented numerous programmes for Talksport, including the Sunday Breakfast show with former Republic of Ireland striker Tony Cascarino and ex-Chelsea captain Andy Townsend. In 2011 he was previewed as one of the 20 most influential people Sky Sports have worked with for its 20th anniversary.

== Awards ==
- 2013 Sports Newspaper of the Year
- 2014 Sports Newspaper of the Year
- 2014 Sports Website of the Year
- 2015 Sports Newspaper of the Year
- 2016 Sports Newspaper of the Year
- 2018 Sports Network of the Year

== Bibliography ==
- Farewell to Upton Park: The Official Celebration of West Ham United's home 1904–2016 (2016) with Andy Hooper
