= 2014 Para-South American Games =

Multi sport event in South America

1st Para-South American Games
- Nations: 8
- Athletes: approx. 600
- Events: 174 in 7 sports
- Opening: 26 March 2014
- Closing: 30 March 2014
- Opened by: Michelle Bachelet; President of Chile
- Torch lighter: Juan Carlos Garrido (weightlifting)
- Main venue: Estadio Nacional
- Website: parasuramericanos.santiago2014.cl

The 2014 South American Para Games, officially known as the 1st Para-South American Games, was a multi-sport event held from 26 to 30 March 2014 in Santiago, Chile.

== Participating nations ==
Eight nations competed in this edition of Para-South American Games. Numbers in parentheses indicate the number of athletes competing.

- Argentina (102)
- Brazil (81)
- Chile (103)
- Colombia (87)
- Ecuador (17)
- Peru (25)
- Uruguay
- Venezuela (118)

== Sports ==
Seven sports were contested in this edition of Para South American Games.

- Para Athletics (92)
- Boccia (7)
- Para Powerlifting (9)
- Para Swimming (54)
- Para Table tennis (4)
- Wheelchair basketball (2)
- Wheelchair tennis (6)

== Medal table ==
Argentina topped the medal table in the first edition of the Para-South American Games with 112 medals. The host nation, Chile, got 43 medals and finished in fifth place.

* Host nation (Chile)

Rank	Nation	Gold	Silver	Bronze	Total
1	Argentina (ARG)	49	37	26	112
2	Brazil (BRA)	47	35	22	104
3	Venezuela (VEN)	34	24	21	79
4	Colombia (COL)	33	43	37	113
5	Chile (CHI)*	10	16	17	43
6	Ecuador (ECU)	1	5	3	9
7	Uruguay (URU)	0	2	0	2
8	Peru (PER)	0	0	5	5
Totals (8 entries)		174	162	131	467
