= Rachel Morris =

British Paralympic sportswoman (born 1979)

Rachel Morris MBE
Personal information
- Born: 25 April 1979 (age 47)
Medal record
Representing Great Britain
Women's para cycling
Paralympic Games
Gold medal – first place	2008 Beijing	Time trial HC A/HC B/HC C
Bronze medal – third place	2012 London	Road race H1–3
World Championships
Gold medal – first place	2007 Bordeaux	Time trial B
Gold medal – first place	2007 Bordeaux	Road race B
Gold medal – first place	2010 Baie-Comeau	Individual time trial H3
Gold medal – first place	2010 Baie-Comeau	Road race
Women's para rowing
Paralympic Games
Gold medal – first place	2016 Rio	Single sculls
World Championships
Gold medal – first place	2015 Lac d'Aiguebelette	Single sculls

Rachel Morris (born 25 April 1979) is a British Paralympic sportswoman who has won Paralympic gold medals in both Cycling and Rowing. She took a gold medal at the 2008 Summer Paralympics as a handcyclist, and eight years later at Rio she won gold in the women's single sculls as a rower.

== Background ==
She lost both her legs to Complex regional pain syndrome and cycles, in part, to manage the pain. She was born in Guildford, Surrey.

== Career ==
=== Cycling ===
Morris won two gold medals at the 2007 World Para-cycling Championships in Bordeaux, France; she won the time trial and road race events in the women's category B races. This made her the first ever British hand-cyclist to be crowned a double World Champion.

Morris was named to the team for Great Britain at the 2008 Summer Paralympics, where she competed in the road race and time trial in the HC A/B/C disability category for athletes who use a handcycle. She finished sixth in the road race but won the gold medal in the time trial; her time of 20 minutes 57.09 seconds was nearly three minutes faster than her nearest competitor.

At the 2010 UCI Para-cycling Road World Championships held in Baie-Comeau, Canada, Morris won two gold medals. Her first came in the H3 category individual time trial; she won the event by over two minutes in a time of 23 minutes 34.71 seconds. Morris won her second gold medal in the road race, beating silver medallist Sandra Graf by over 80 seconds.

Morris was selected to compete for Great Britain at the 2012 Summer Paralympics, where she was aiming to defend her title in the time trial and also to compete in the road race. In July 2012 her participation at the Games was placed in doubt after she was hit by a car during a time trial near her home in Farnham, Surrey. The incident left her with whiplash and shoulder injuries. In addition to her physical injuries Morris' handcycle was damaged in the crash, meaning she had to use her competition bike for training and order a new one for use in the Paralympics. She recovered in time to compete in her first event at the Games on 5 September. In the H1-3 road race at the Games, Morris and team-mate Karen Darke crossed the line together whilst holding hands in order to tie for third place and share the bronze medal: however the photo finish revealed that Morris arrived at the line first, so she alone was awarded third.

=== Rowing ===
She subsequently took up rowing, in the ASW1x (arms and shoulders women's single sculls) event, came 5th at the 2014 World Rowing Championships in Amsterdam, and won the silver medal at the 2015 World Rowing Championships at Lac d'Aiguebelette in France, thus qualifying for the 2016 Rio Paralympics. Morris took the gold in the single sculls event at the Games. However Morris was forced to give up the sport after undergoing two shoulder operations after the Games, after which she spent almost a year in hospital recovering.

=== Skiing ===
After speaking with former rowing team-mate-turned-cross-country skier Scott Meenagh, Morris turned her attention to skiing, first trying a sit ski in March 2018 and taking up cross-country skiing in November of that year. She made her debut at the World Para Nordic Skiing Championships in 2019 in Prince George, British Columbia.

=== Honours ===
Morris was appointed Member of the Order of the British Empire (MBE) in the 2017 New Year Honours for services to rowing.
