= Kadidia Nikiema =

Personal information
- National team: Burkina Faso

Sport
- Country: Burkina Faso
- Sport: Cycling
- Disability: Paralysis in right leg
- Disability class: H3
- Updated on November 4, 2017

Kadidia Nikiema is a Burkinabé Paralympic cyclist in the H3 disability class. She competed for her country at the 2012 Summer Paralympics in London, England.

== Career ==
At the age of four, Kadidia Nikiema was paralysed in her right leg after contracting polio. This meant that she was unable to attend school in her native Burkina Faso as she needed to walk there. Some nuns gave Nikiema a handcycle at the age of 17, enabling her to get around and take part in sports. Nikiema subsequently emigrated to Canada.

She was then selected as part of the Burkina Faso team at the 2012 Summer Paralympics in London, England. When the team arrived in London, they found that their funding was cut and they were unable to stay at the accommodation arranged through Kent County Council. Instead, she and the rest of the team trained at the facilities at Brentwood School, Essex, and at Brands Hatch. Nikiema stayed with local nuns in Brentwood, and shared a handcycle with fellow athlete Lassane Gasbeogo.

At the 2012 Summer Paralympics opening ceremony, Nikiema carried her nation's flag in the Parade of Nations. She competed in both the women's road race H1–3 and road time trial H3. Nikiema was lapped in the road race, and sixth in the time trial. After the London Paralympics, her bike was damaged. In order to continue to race, a new bike was crowdfunded online.
