= Sarah Storey =

British cyclist (born 1977)

Dame Sarah Storey DBE
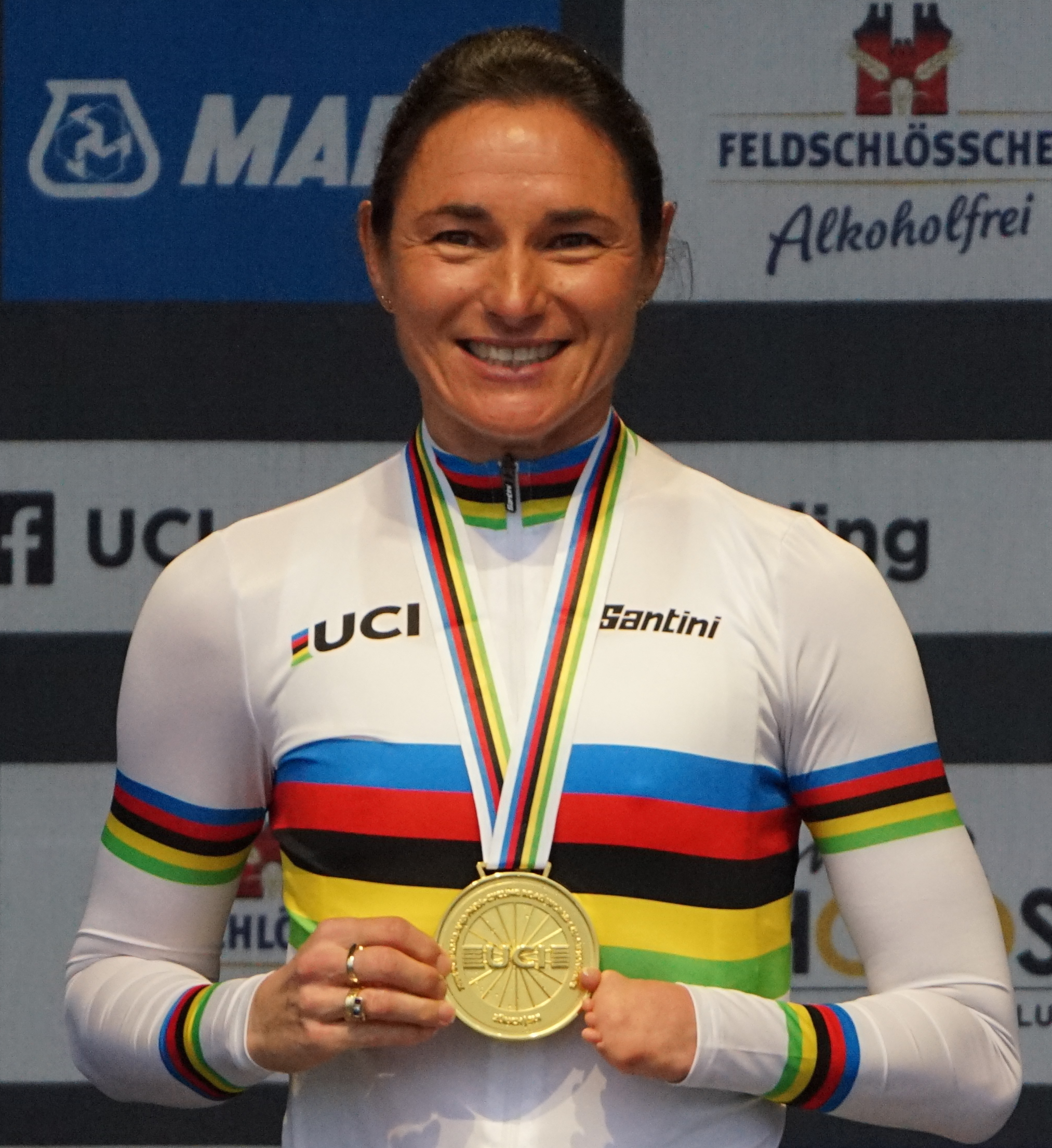
- Storey at the 2024 Road World Championships

Personal information
- Full name: Sarah Storey
- Born: 26 October 1977 (age 49) Manchester, England

Cycling career
- Sport: Cycling
- Current team: Storey Racing
- Discipline: Road
- Role: Rider

Amateur teams
- 2010–2011: Horizon Fitness
- 2012: Escentual–For Viored
- 2013–2015: Breast Cancer Care
- 2017: Storey Racing
- 2019–: Storey Racing

Professional teams
- 2016: Podium Ambition Pro Cycling
- 2018: Storey Racing
Medal record
Representing Great Britain
Women's swimming
Event	1st	2nd	3rd
Paralympic Games	5	8	3
IPC World Championships	6	5	5
Total	11	13	8
Paralympic Games
Gold medal – first place	1992 Barcelona	100 m backstroke S10
Gold medal – first place	1992 Barcelona	200 m individual medley SM10
Gold medal – first place	1996 Atlanta	100 m backstroke S10
Gold medal – first place	1996 Atlanta	100 m breaststroke SB10
Gold medal – first place	1996 Atlanta	200 m individual medley SM10
Silver medal – second place	1992 Barcelona	400 m freestyle S10
Silver medal – second place	1992 Barcelona	4×100 m freestyle S7–10
Silver medal – second place	1992 Barcelona	4×100 m medley S7–10
Silver medal – second place	1996 Atlanta	400 m freestyle S10
Silver medal – second place	2000 Sydney	100 m backstroke S10
Silver medal – second place	2000 Sydney	4×100 m medley 34pts
Silver medal – second place	2004 Athens	100 m breaststroke SB9
Silver medal – second place	2004 Athens	200 m individual medley SM10
Bronze medal – third place	1992 Barcelona	100 m freestyle S10
Bronze medal – third place	1996 Atlanta	100 m freestyle S10
Bronze medal – third place	2004 Athens	100 m freestyle S10
IPC World Championships
Gold medal – first place	1994 Malta	4x100m Freestyle relay S7-S10 and 100 m Breaststroke SB10
Gold medal – first place	2002 Mar del Plata	100 m Freestyle S10
Gold medal – first place	2002 Mar del Plata	200 m Ind. Medley SM10
Gold medal – first place	2002 Mar del Plata	400 m Freestyle S10
Silver medal – second place	1994 Malta	100 m Backstroke S10
Silver medal – second place	1994 Malta	200 m Ind. Medley SM10
Silver medal – second place	1994 Malta	400 m Freestyle S10
Silver medal – second place	1998 Christchurch	100 m Backstroke S10
Silver medal – second place	1998 Christchurch	4x100 m Medley open
Silver medal – second place	2002 Mar del Plata	100 m Backstroke S10
Bronze medal – third place	1994 Malta	4x100 m Medley S7-10
Bronze medal – third place	1998 Christchurch	200 m Ind. Medley SM10
Bronze medal – third place	1998 Christchurch	400 m Freestyle S10
Bronze medal – third place	1998 Christchurch	4x100 m Freestyle open
Bronze medal – third place	2002 Mar del Plata	50 m Freestyle S10
Women's cycling
Event	1st	2nd	3rd
Paralympic Games	14	0	0
Para Track World Champs	18	2	3
Para Road World Champs	14	2	0
Para Euro Cycling Champs	3	1	0
Total	49	5	3
Paralympic Games
Gold medal – first place	2008 Beijing	Time trial LC 1–2/CP 4
Gold medal – first place	2012 London	Time Trial C5
Gold medal – first place	2012 London	Road Race C4–5
Gold medal – first place	2016 Rio de Janeiro	Time trial C5
Gold medal – first place	2016 Rio de Janeiro	Road race C4-5
Gold medal – first place	2020 Tokyo	Time trial C5
Gold medal – first place	2020 Tokyo	Individual Road Race C4–5
Gold medal – first place	2024 Paris	Time trial C5
Gold medal – first place	2024 Paris	Road race C4–5
Road World Championships
Gold medal – first place	2009 Bogogno	Time trial LC1
Gold medal – first place	2009 Bogogno	Road race LC1
Gold medal – first place	2010 Baie-Comeau	Time trial C5
Gold medal – first place	2010 Baie-Comeau	Road race C5
Gold medal – first place	2011 Roskilde	Time trial C5
Gold medal – first place	2011 Roskilde	Road race C5
Gold medal – first place	2014 Greenville	Time trial C5
Gold medal – first place	2014 Greenville	Road race C5
Gold medal – first place	2015 Nottwil	Time trial C5
Gold medal – first place	2015 Nottwil	Road race C5
Gold medal – first place	2023 Glasgow	Time trial C5
Gold medal – first place	2023 Glasgow	Road race C5
Gold medal – first place	2024 Zurich	Time trial C5
Gold medal – first place	2024 Zurich	Road race C5
Silver medal – second place	2006 Aigle	Time trial
Silver medal – second place	2006 Aigle	Road race
European Championships
Gold medal – first place	2005 Alkmaar	Road Race
Silver medal – second place	2005 Alkmaar	Time Trial
Track cycling
Paralympic Games
Gold medal – first place	2008 Beijing	Individual pursuit LC 1–2/CP 4
Gold medal – first place	2012 London	Individual pursuit C5
Gold medal – first place	2012 London	Time Trial C4–5 500m
Gold medal – first place	2016 Rio de Janeiro	Individual pursuit C5
Gold medal – first place	2020 Tokyo	Individual pursuit C5
Track World Championships
Gold medal – first place	2006 Aigle	3km Pursuit LC1
Gold medal – first place	2007 Bordeaux	3km Pursuit LC1
Gold medal – first place	2009 Manchester	3km Pursuit LC1
Gold medal – first place	2009 Manchester	500m time trial LC1
Gold medal – first place	2011 Montichiari	500m time trial C5
Gold medal – first place	2011 Montichiari	4km Pursuit C5
Gold medal – first place	2012 Carson	500m time trial C5
Gold medal – first place	2012 Carson	3km Pursuit C5
Gold medal – first place	2014 Aguascalientes	3km Pursuit C5
Gold medal – first place	2014 Aguascalientes	Scratch race C1-5
Gold medal – first place	2015 Apeldoorn	500m time trial C5
Gold medal – first place	2015 Apeldoorn	3km Pursuit C5
Gold medal – first place	2016 Montichiari	3km Pursuit C5
Gold medal – first place	2020 Milton	Individual pursuit C5
Gold medal – first place	2020 Milton	Scratch race C5
Gold medal – first place	2020 Milton	Omnium C5
Gold medal – first place	2022 Saint-Quentin-en-Yvelines	Individual pursuit C5
Silver medal – second place	2016 Montichiari	500m time trial C5
Silver medal – second place	2016 Montichiari	Scratch race C5
Bronze medal – third place	2007 Bordeaux	400m time trial LC1
Bronze medal – third place	2014 Aguascalientes	500m time trial C5
Bronze medal – third place	2020 Milton	500m time trial C5
European Championships
Gold medal – first place	2005 Alkmaar	Individual Pursuit
Gold medal – first place	2005 Alkmaar	500m time trial

Dame Sarah Joanne Storey (née Bailey; born 26 October 1977) is a British cyclist and swimmer, a multiple gold medallist in the Paralympic Games, and six times British (able-bodied) national track champion (2 × Pursuit, 1 × Points, 3 × Team Pursuit).

Her total of 30 Paralympic medals, including 19 gold medals, makes her the most successful (by gold medals) and most decorated (by total medals) British Paralympian of all time as well as one of the most decorated Paralympic athletes of all time. She has the unique distinction of winning five gold medals in Paralympics before turning 19, and won her last Paralympic gold at the age of 41.

Storey's major achievements include being a 29-time World champion (6 in swimming and 23 in cycling), a 21-time European champion (18 in swimming and 3 in cycling) and holding 75 world records. She is regarded as one of the most experienced campaigners in the history of the Paralympics as she took part at the Paralympics on nine occasions between 1992 and 2024.

For several years at her peak, Storey's progress was such that she was competitive at able-bodied elite level on the track, and for a period was in the Great Britain Olympic squad programme for team pursuit. She won a number of UCI Track Cycling World Cup gold medals in team pursuit in that period, and narrowly missed the (able-bodied) women's hour world record by less than 600 metres, taking the national record. She remains the current para world record holder in women's 3000m individual pursuit and hour record.

On 2 September 2021, she surpassed Mike Kenny's 16 Paralympic gold medal record to become Great Britain's most successful Paralympic athlete of all time after securing her 17th Paralympic gold medal when she won the women's road race C4-5 event.

== Early life ==
Storey was born Sarah Bailey in Manchester without a functioning left hand after her arm became entangled in the umbilical cord in the womb and the hand did not develop as normal. As a schoolgirl, she was subjected to bullying by her schoolmates and also faced eating disorder issues at school. She joined her first swimming club at the age of ten and was told by her coach that she had started her training too late to be good at anything.

== Swimming at the Paralympic Games ==
Storey began her Paralympic career as a swimmer, winning two golds, three silvers and a bronze in Barcelona in 1992 at the age of 14.

She retained her Paralympic gold medals in women's 100m backstroke and 200m individual medley events at the 1996 Summer Paralympics. Despite the diagnosis of chronic fatigue syndrome (ME), she continued to participate in swimming and claimed four silver medals and a solitary bronze in the next two Paralympic Games in 2000 and 2004 before quitting the sport.

== Cycling ==
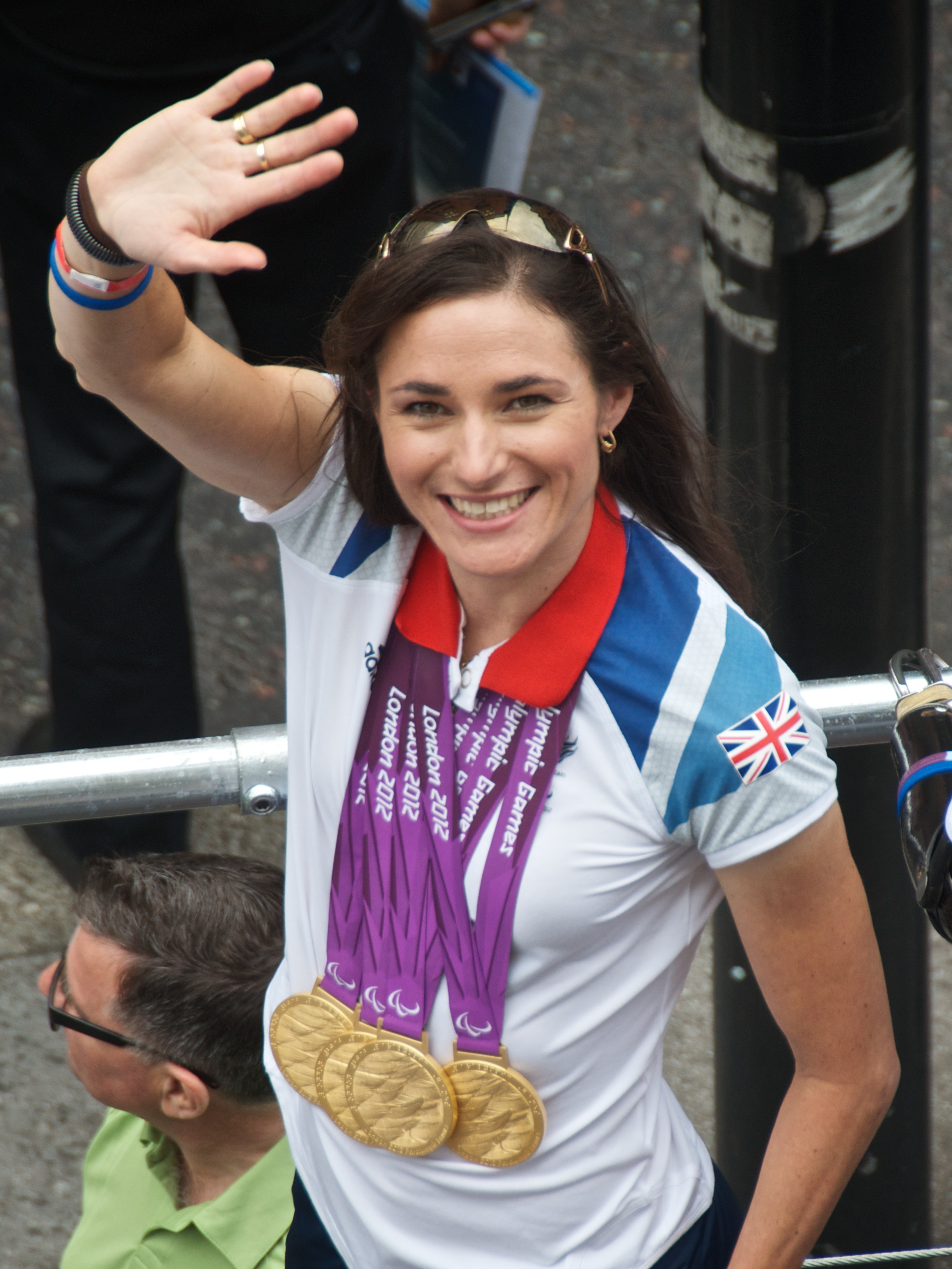
Storey at the Our Greatest Team Parade, in 2012.

At the 2008 Paralympic Games, her fifth, Storey won the individual pursuit – in a time that would have been in the top eight at the Olympic final – and the women's road time trial.

Storey also competes against non-disabled athletes and won the 3 km national track pursuit championship in 2008, eight days after taking the Paralympic title, and successfully defended her title in 2009. In 2014, she added a third national track title with a win in the points race.

Storey qualified to join the England team for the 2010 Commonwealth Games in Delhi, where she was "the first disabled cyclist to compete for England at the Commonwealth Games", against non-disabled cyclists. She was also the second Paralympic athlete overall competing for England at the Games, following archer Danielle Brown earlier in Delhi.

In 2011, Storey competed for one of the three places in the GB squad for the women's team pursuit at the 2012 Olympic Games. Although she was in the winning team for the World Cup event in Cali, Colombia in December 2011, she was informed afterwards that she was being dropped from the team pursuit squad.

London's 2012 Paralympics Games saw Storey win Britain's first gold medal, in the women's individual C5 pursuit. She went on to win three more gold medals, one in the Time Trial C4–5 500m, one in the Individual Road Time Trial C5 and finally one in the Individual Road Race C4–5.

In 2014, Storey and her husband Barney Storey founded the Pearl Izumi Sports Tours International women's amateur cycling team, supporting the charity Boot Out Breast Cancer. The team fielded squads in the 2014 and 2015 British road race seasons.

Storey attempted to break the world hour record at the Lee Valley VeloPark in London on 28 February 2015. She set a distance of 45.502 km, which was 563m short of Leontien Zijlaard-van Moorsel's 2003 overall world record – however Storey's distance did set a new world record in the C5 Paralympic cycling class as well as a new British record.

In the Rio 2016 Paralympics Storey became Britain's most successful female Paralympian when she won the C5 3000m individual pursuit final.

She became the first athlete to win the gold medal for Great Britain at the 2020 Summer Paralympics when she defended her Paralympic title in the women's individual pursuit C5 event. It was also her fifth Paralympic gold medal in track cycling and her tenth Paralympic gold medal in women's cycling. It was also her record 15th gold medal in her Paralympic career. During the qualifying heat event at the 2020 Summer Paralympics she broke her own world record by four seconds in the individual pursuit C5 category.

In 2024 she won at the Paris Paralympics her 18th Games gold medal, winning the women's road event for a fifth successive Paralympics.

== Personal life ==
Storey married tandem pilot and coach Barney Storey in 2007. She gave birth to a daughter on 30 June 2013 and a son on 14 October 2017. She and her husband live in Disley, Cheshire.

In April 2019, Storey was appointed Active Travel Commissioner for the Sheffield City Region. In April 2024 Storey was elected as President of Lancashire County Cricket Club.

Storey is also a long-standing patron of the charity Boot out Breast Cancer, founded by Debbie Dowie, wife of football Manager Iain Dowie.

Storey is related to the screenwriter Danny Brocklehurst.

== Honours ==
Storey was appointed Member of the Order of the British Empire (MBE) in the 1998 New Year Honours "for services to Swimming for People with Disabilities". Following the Beijing Games, she was appointed Officer of the Order of the British Empire (OBE) in the 2009 New Year Honours "for services to Disabled Sport." In 2012, she was awarded an honorary degree by the University of Manchester. Following the 2012 London Games, she was appointed Dame Commander of the Order of the British Empire (DBE) in the 2013 New Year Honours "for services to para-cycling".

Storey was a nominee for the 2008 Laureus World Sportswoman of the Year with a Disability and the 2012 BBC Sports Personality of the Year. She won The Sunday Times Disability Sportswoman of the Year in 2020, her win being officially announced in an online ceremony. Storey was a nominee for the 2024 BBC Sports Personality of the Year. Her name is one of those featured on the sculpture Ribbons, unveiled in 2024.

== Television appearances ==
Storey was scheduled to appear in the 17th series of Dancing on Ice in 2025. However, she was forced to withdraw before the start of the series after fracturing her ankle during training.

In 2026, she was announced as one of the new contestants taking part in the 24th series of Strictly Come Dancing, partnered with Julian Caillon where she finished in 13th place.

== Major results ==
1992

Paralympic Games

1st 100 m Backstroke
1st 200 m Individual Medley
2nd 400 m Freestyle
2nd 4x100 m Freestyle
2nd 4x100 m Medley
3rd 100 m Freestyle

1994

World Para Swimming Championships

1st 200 m Individual Medley
1st 100 m Breaststroke
2nd 100 m Backstroke
2nd 400 m Freestyle
3rd 4x100 m Medley

1996

Paralympic Games

1st 100 m Breaststroke
1st 100 m Backstroke
1st 200 m Individual Medley
2nd 400 m Freestyle
3rd 100 m Freestyle

1998

World Para Swimming Championships

2nd 100 m Backstroke
2nd 4x100 m Medley
3rd 400 m Freestyle
3rd 200 m Individual Medley
3rd 100 m Breaststroke
3rd 4x100 m Freestyle

2000

Paralympic Games

2nd 100 m Backstroke
2nd 4x100 m Medley

2002

World Para Swimming Championships

1st 100 m Freestyle
1st 400 m Freestyle
1st 200 m Individual Medley
2nd 100 m Backstroke
3rd 50 m Freestyle

2004

Paralympic Games

2nd 100 m Breaststroke
2nd 200 m Individual Medley
3rd 100 m Freestyle

2005

European Para-cycling Championships

1st Road Race
1st Individual Pursuit
1st 500m Time Trial
2nd Time Trial

European Open Para-cycling Championships

1st Road Race
1st Individual Pursuit
2nd 500m Time Trial
3rd Time Trial

National Track Championships

7th Individual Pursuit

2006

UCI Track Para-cycling World Championships

1st Individual Pursuit
3rd 500m Time Trial

National Track Championships

1st Para-cycling Individual Pursuit
3rd Individual Pursuit
7th 500m Time Trial

UCI Para-cycling Road World Championships

2nd Road Race
2nd Time Trial

2007

UCI Para-cycling Road World Championships

1st Individual Pursuit
3rd 500m Time Trial

National Road Championships

1st Para-cycling Road Race

National Track Championships

1st Para-cycling Individual Pursuit
7th 500m Time Trial

UCI Paralympic World Cup

1st Individual Pursuit
1st 500m Time Trial

2008

Paralympic Games

1st Time Trial
1st Individual Pursuit

National Track Championships

1st Individual Pursuit

UCI Paralympic World Cup

1st Individual Pursuit
3rd 500m Time Trial

2009

UCI Track Para-cycling World Championships

1st Individual Pursuit
1st 500m Time Trial

UCI Road Para-cycling World Championships

1st Road Race
1st Time Trial

UCI Masters Road Para-cycling World Championships

1st Time Trial
2nd Road Race

National Track Championships

1st Individual Pursuit

UCI Paralympic World Cup

1st Individual Pursuit
1st 500m Time Trial

2010

UCI Road Para-cycling World Championships

1st Road Race
1st Time Trial

National Track Championships

1st Team Pursuit
2nd Individual Pursuit
6th Commonwealth Games, Individual Pursuit

1st Overall 2 Days of Bedford International Stage Race

1st Stages 1 & 2

9th National Road Championships, Road Race

2011

UCI Track Para-cycling World Championships

1st Individual Pursuit
1st 500m Time Trial

UCI Road Para-cycling World Championships

1st Road Race
1st Time Trial

National Track Championships

1st Team Pursuit
4th Individual Pursuit

1st Overall 2 Days of Bedford International Stage Race

1st Mountains classification
1st Stages 1 & 2

UCI Track Cycling World Cup–Manchester

1st Team Pursuit

Sydney Road World Cup

1st Road Race
1st Time Trial

1st Blenheim Palace Time Trial Event
3rd National Road Championships, Time Trial

2012

Paralympic Games

1st Individual Pursuit
1st 500m Time Trial
1st Time Trial
1st Road Race

2012 UCI Track Para-cycling World Championships

1st Individual Pursuit
1st Time Trial
2nd Team Sprint

UCI Track Cycling World Cup–Cali

1st Team Pursuit

1st Overall Essex Giro Stage Race
1st Blenheim Palace Time Trial
1st Curlew Cup Road Race
1st Caperwry Road Race
1st Cheshire Classic Road Race
9th Overall Tour du Limousin

2014

2014 UCI Track Para-cycling World Championships

1st Individual Pursuit
1st Scratch Race
3rd 500m Time Trial

2014 UCI Road Para-cycling World Championships

1st Road Race
1st Time Trial

National Track Championships

1st Points Race
2nd Team Pursuit

1st Overall Essex Giro Stage Race
1st Cheshire Classic Road Race
1st Stage 2 Tour de Bretagne Feminine
3rd National Road Championships, Time Trial

2015

2015 UCI Track Para-cycling World Championships

1st Individual Pursuit
2nd 500m Time Trial

2015 UCI Road Para-cycling World Championships

1st Road Race
1st Time Trial

National Track Championships

1st Team Pursuit

1st Cheshire Classic Road Race
1st Overall National Time Trial Series
3rd National Road Championships, Time Trial
3rd Points Race, Revolution – Round 4, Glasgow

2016

Paralympic Games

1st Individual Pursuit
1st Time Trial
1st Road Race

2016 UCI Track Para-cycling World Championships

1st Individual Pursuit
2nd 500m Time Trial
2nd Scratch Race

3rd National Road Championships, Time Trial

2017

National Track Championships

3rd Team Pursuit

2019

2019 UCI Track Para-cycling World Championships

1st Individual Pursuit

2020

2019 UCI Track Para-cycling World Championships

1st Individual Pursuit
1st Scratch Race
1st Omnium

2020

Paralympic Games

1st Individual Pursuit
1st Time Trial
1st Road Race

=== World records ===
Date	Discipline	Time	Event	Location	Ref
14 August 2005	3000m Individual Pursuit (LC 1)	4'01"140		Alkmaar, Netherlands	
11 September 2006	3000m Individual Pursuit (LC 1)	3'53"107		Aigle, Switzerland	
12 September 2006	3000m Individual Pursuit (LC 1)	3'51"666		Aigle, Switzerland	
22 August 2007	3000m Individual Pursuit (LC 1)	3'48"622		Bordeaux, France	
10 September 2008	3000m Individual Pursuit (LC 1)	3'36"637	2008 Paralympic Games	Beijing, China	
7 November 2009	3000m Individual Pursuit (LC 1)	3'34"266		Manchester, Great Britain	
29 November 2011	3000m Individual Pursuit (C5)	3'33"248		Manchester, Great Britain	
30 August 2012	3000m Individual Pursuit (C5)	3'32"170	2012 Paralympic Games	London, Great Britain	
2 April 2014	3000m Individual Pursuit (C5)	3'32"050		Aguascalientes, Mexico	
28 February 2015	Hour record (C5)	45.502 km	UCI Track Cycling World Cup	Lee Valley VeloPark, London, Great Britain	
8 September 2016	3000m Individual Pursuit (C5)	3'31"394	2016 Paralympic Games	Rio de Janeiro, Brazil	

== See also ==
- 2012 Olympics gold post boxes in the United Kingdom
- List of multiple Paralympic gold medalists
- List of multiple Paralympic gold medalists at a single Games
