= Ursula Schwaller =

Swiss para-cyclist

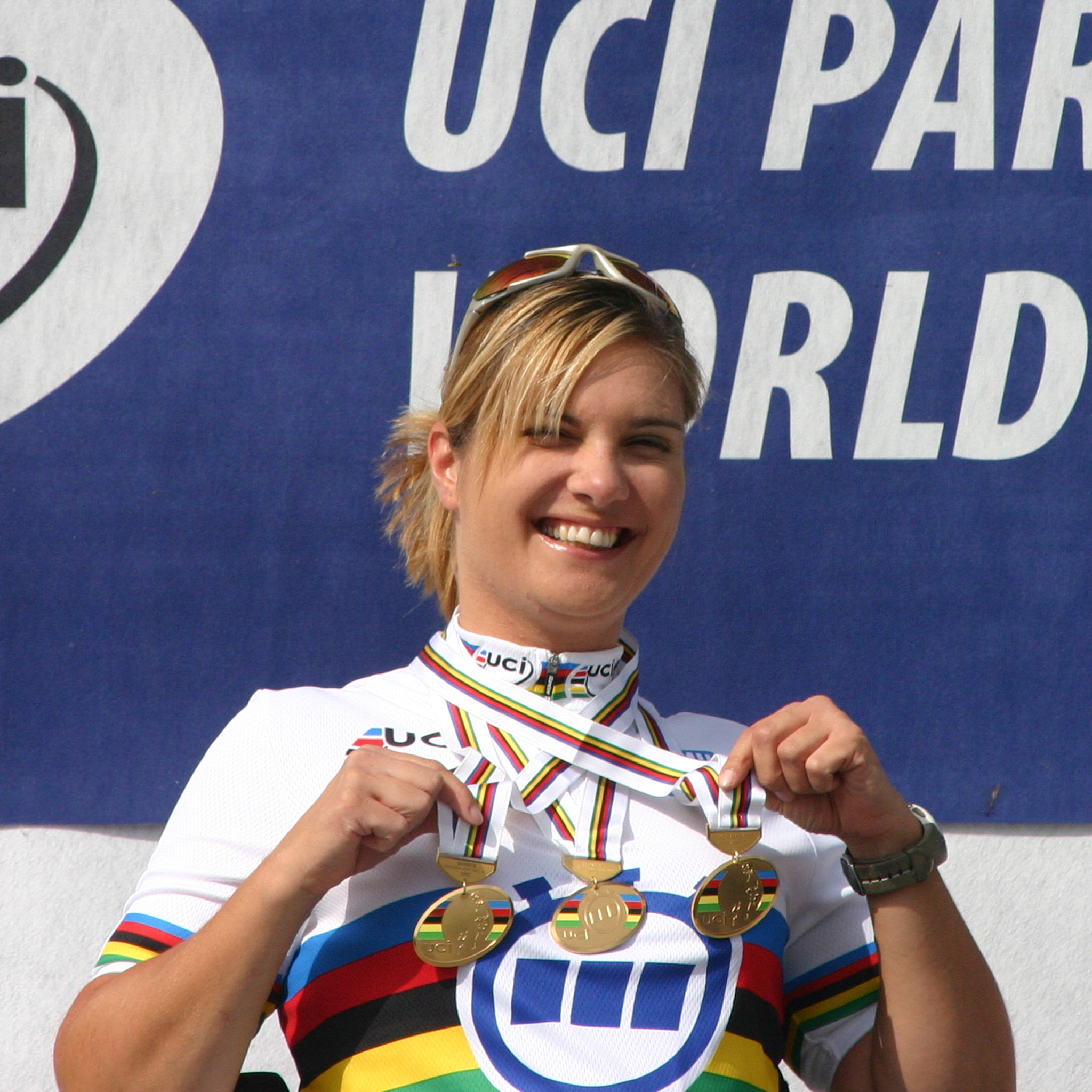
- Ursula Schwaller in 2009

Personal information
- National team: Switzerland
- Born: 26 June 1976 (age 50)
- Occupation: Architect
- Website: www.ursulaschwaller.ch

Sport
- Country: Switzerland
- Sport: Cycling
- Disability class: H1–2
Medal record
Women's cycling
Representing Switzerland
Paralympic Games
Bronze medal – third place	2012 London	Individual road time trial H1–2
Bronze medal – third place	2012 London	Mixed road team relay

Ursula Schwaller (born 26 June 1976) is a Swiss para-cyclist, who won two bronze medals at the 2012 Summer Paralympics.

== Career ==
Ursula Schwaller was born on 26 June 1976. In 2002, she had an accident while mountain trekking. Her resulting spinal injury caused her to become paraplegic. She was already active in sports, but following the injury she decided to take up para-sports instead. For example, she took up cycling using a handcycle. Schwaller set herself the objective of competing at the 2008 Summer Paralympics in Beijing, China, as part of the Swiss team. She was chosen, and finished fourth in the women's road time trial H1–2. Schwaller was less successful in the road race, where she finished in ninth place.

At the 2012 Summer Paralympics, she won the bronze medal in the women's road time trial H1–2 despite riding with a thumb injury restricting her in the second half of the race. Along with fellow para-cyclists Jean-Marc Berset and Heinz Frei, they also took the bronze medal in the team mixed relay, marking the 11th medal of the Games for Switzerland. In 2015, she sought to break the handbike record in the 300 kilometres (190 mi) long Vätternrundan road race. She was also the first woman to compete using a handbike, which required special permission for her to take part.

== Personal life ==
Outside of sports, Schwaller works as an architect.
