= Francesca Fenocchio =

Italian Paralympic cyclist

Personal information
- Born: 9 December 1978 (age 47) Albaretto Torre, Italy

Sport
- Country: Italy
- Sport: Para cycling
Medal record
| Event | 1st | 2nd | 3rd |
|---|---|---|---|
| Paralympic Games | 0 | 1 | 0 |

Francesca Fenocchio (born 9 December 1978) is an Italian paralympic cyclist who won a silver medal at the 2012 Summer Paralympics.
