= Sara Tretola =

Sara Tretola is a Swiss para-cyclist. he won a bronze medal at the 2004 Summer Paralympics.

== Career ==
At the age of 20, Tretola made her Paralympics debut at the 2004 Summer Paralympics and won a bronze medal in the women's road bicycle time trial LC1-4/CP 3/4. She qualified for the 2012 Summer Paralympics but failed to medal after finishing 9th.
