= 2011 UCI Para-cycling Track World Championships – Women's individual pursuit =

Rainbow jersey

The women's individual pursuit events at the 2011 UCI Para-cycling Track World Championships was held on March 11, 12 and 13.

== Medalists ==
There were no medals awarded in the classification C1 event, as there was only one contestant.

Distance	Class	Gold	Silver	Bronze
3 km	C2	Allison Jones; United States	Raquel Acinas Poncelas; Spain	Qi Tang; China
4 km	C4	Susan Powell; Australia	Marie-Claude Molnar; Canada	Alexandra Green; Australia
4 km	C5	Sarah Storey; United Kingdom	Greta Neimanas; United States	Jennifer Schuble; United States
4 km	B	Sonia Waddell, Jayne Parsons; New Zealand	Fiona Duncan, Lora Turnham; United Kingdom	Francine Meehan, Catherine Walsh; Ireland

== Results ==
=== C1 ===
- C1 - locomotor disability: Neurological, or amputation

==== Finals ====
Rank	Name	Nation	Time
1	Jayme Paris	Australia	4:56.746

=== C2 ===
- C2 - locomotor disability: Neurological, decrease in muscle strength, or amputation

==== Qualifying ====
Rank	Name	Nation	Time	Notes
1	Allison Jones	United States	4:29.675	
2	Raquel Acinas Poncelas	Spain	4:32.675	
3	Qi Tang	China	4:37.461	
4	Barbara Buchan	United States	4:44.490	
5	Yvonne Marzinke	Germany	4:52.083	
6	Bianbian Sun	China	4:55.125	
7	Danijela Jovanovic	Serbia	6:22.565	

==== Finals ====
Rank	Name	Nation	Time
Gold medal race
1st place, gold medalist(s)	Allison Jones	United States	4:27.155
2nd place, silver medalist(s)	Raquel Acinas Poncelas	Spain	4:37.108
Bronze medal race
3rd place, bronze medalist(s)	Qi Tang	China	OVL
4	Barbara Buchan	United States	OVL

=== C4 ===
- C4 - locomotor disability: Neurological, or amputation

==== Qualifying ====
Rank	Name	Nation	Time	Notes
1	Susan Powell	Australia	4:15.781	
2	Marie-Claude Molnar	Canada	4:22.979	
3	Alexandra Green	Australia	4:24.784	
4	Jianping Ruan	China	4:26.632	
5	Ya Ping Ye	China	4:27.648	
6	Roxanne Burns	South Africa	4:45.072	

==== Finals ====
Rank	Name	Nation	Time
Gold medal race
1st place, gold medalist(s)	Susan Powell	Australia	4:09.367
2nd place, silver medalist(s)	Marie Claude Molnar	Canada	OVL
Bronze medal race
3rd place, bronze medalist(s)	Alexandra Green	Australia	OVL
4	Jianping Ruan	China	OVL

=== C5 ===
- C5 - locomotor disability: Neurological, or amputation

==== Qualifying ====
Rank	Name	Nation	Time	Notes
1	Sarah Storey	United Kingdom	3:36.852	
2	Greta Neimanas	United States	4:00.060	
3	Fiona Southorn	New Zealand	4:00.721	
4	Jennifer Schuble	United States	4:02.516	
5	Kerstin Brachtendorf	Germany	4:06.426	
6	Anna Harkowska	Poland	4:06.887	
7	Ju Fang Zhou	China	4:07.048	
8	Qing Guo	China	4:16.540	
9	Sara Tretola	Switzerland	4:20.126	
10	Trix Schwedler	Ireland	4:30.099	
11	Michaela Bitsch	Germany	4:39.371	

==== Finals ====
Rank	Name	Nation	Time
Gold medal race
1st place, gold medalist(s)	Sarah Storey	United Kingdom	OVL
2nd place, silver medalist(s)	Greta Neimanas	United States	OVL
Bronze medal race
3rd place, bronze medalist(s)	Jennifer Schuble	United States	4:03.255
4	Fiona Southorn	New Zealand	4:04.263

=== Tandem B ===
- Tandem B - visual impairment

==== Qualifying ====
Rank	Name	Nation	Time	Notes
1	Lora Turnham, Fiona Duncan	United Kingdom	3:38.850	
2	Jayne Parsons, Sonia Waddell	New Zealand	3:39.458	
3	Catherine Walsh, Francine Meehan	Ireland	3:41.042	
4	Karissa Whitsell, Mackenzie Woodring	United States	3:42.561	
5	Henrike Handrup, Ellen Heiny	Germany	3:43.397	
6	Brandie O'Connor, Kerry Knowler	Australia	3:44.070	
7	Phillipa Gray, Laura Thomson	New Zealand	3:44.657	
8	Aileen McGlynn, Helen Scott	United Kingdom	3:45.095	
9	Genevieve Ouellet, Emilie Roy	Canada	3:50.016	
10	Kathrin Goeken, Kim van Dijk	Netherlands	3:54.576	
11	Felicity Johnson, Stephanie Morton	Australia	3:57.181	
12	Joleen Hakker, Samantha van Steenis	Netherlands	3:57.826	
13	Carrie Willoughby, Shelby Reynolds	United States	3:58.090	
14	Adamantia Chalkiadaki, Argyro Milaki	Greece	4:01.129	
15	Cinzia Coluzzi, Annamaria Scafetta	Italy	4:05.006	

==== Finals ====
Rank	Name	Nation	Time
Gold medal race
1st place, gold medalist(s)	Jayne Parsons, Sonia Waddell	New Zealand	3:39.376
2nd place, silver medalist(s)	Lora Turnham, Fiona Duncan	United Kingdom	3:41.450
Bronze medal race
3rd place, bronze medalist(s)	Catherine Walsh, Francine Meehan	Ireland	3:42.730
4	Karissa Whitsell, Mackenzie Woodring	United States	3:44.517

== See also ==
- 2011 UCI Track Cycling World Championships – Women's individual pursuit
