= List of cyclists at the 2012 Summer Paralympics =

This is a list of all cyclists who competed at the 2012 Summer Paralympics in London, United Kingdom.

== 2012 Paralympic cyclists ==
Cyclist	Nation	Discipline	Class
Walter Ablinger	Austria	Road cycling	H2
Nestor Ayala Ayala	Colombia	Road cycling	T2
Quentin Aubague	France	Road cycling	T1
Nigel Barley	Australia	Road cycling	H3
Mark Beggs	Canada	Road cycling	H2
Pascale Bercovitch	Israel	Road cycling	H4
Joseph Berenyi	United States	Road cycling	C3
Joseph Berenyi	United States	Track cycling	C3
Arnold Boldt	Canada	Road cycling	C2
Arnold Boldt	Canada	Track cycling	C2
James Brown	Ireland	Road cycling	B
James Brown	Ireland	Track cycling	B
Roxanne Burns	South Africa	Road cycling	C4
Roxanne Burns	South Africa	Track cycling	C4
Jon-Allan Butterworth	Great Britain	Road cycling	C5
Jon-Allan Butterworth	Great Britain	Track cycling	C5
Alfonso Cabello	Spain	Road cycling	C5
Alfonso Cabello	Spain	Track cycling	C5
Madre Carinus	South Africa	Road cycling	T2
Daniel Chalifour	Canada	Road cycling	B
Daniel Chalifour	Canada	Track cycling	B
Miguel Angel Clemente Solano	Spain	Road cycling	B
Miguel Angel Clemente Solano	Spain	Track cycling	B
Mark Colbourne	Great Britain	Road cycling	C1
Mark Colbourne	Great Britain	Track cycling	C1
Carol Cooke	Australia	Road cycling	T2
Jody Cundy	Great Britain	Track cycling	C4
Karen Darke	Great Britain	Road cycling	H2
Marianna Davis	United States	Road cycling	H2
Damien Debeaupuits	France	Road cycling	B
Wim Decleir	Belgium	Road cycling	H4
Yegor Dementyev	Ukraine	Road cycling	C5
Yegor Dementyev	Ukraine	Track cycling	C5
Tereza Diepoldova	Czech Republic	Road cycling	C2
Tereza Diepoldova	Czech Republic	Track cycling	C2
Haki Doku	Albania	Road cycling	H2
Olivier Donval	France	Road cycling	B
Hans-Peter Durst	Germany	Road cycling	T2
Maurice Eckhard Tió	Spain	Road cycling	C2
Maurice Eckhard Tió	Spain	Track cycling	C2
Wolfgang Eibeck	Austria	Road cycling	C5
Wolfgang Eibeck	Austria	Track cycling	C5
Andrea Eskau	Germany	Road cycling	H4
Christoph Etzlstorfer	Austria	Road cycling	H1
Neil Fachie	Great Britain	Track cycling	B
Tobias Fankhauser	Switzerland	Road cycling	H1
Giorgio Farroni	Italy	Road cycling	T2
Heinz Frei	Switzerland	Road cycling	H2
Lassane Gasbeogo	Burkina Faso	Road cycling	H4
Kathrin Goeken	Netherlands	Road cycling	B
Soelito Gohr	Brazil	Road cycling	C5
Soelito Gohr	Brazil	Track cycling	C5
Sandra Graf	Switzerland	Road cycling	H3
Tobias Graf	Germany	Road cycling	C2
Tobias Graf	Germany	Track cycling	C2
Phillipa Gray	New Zealand	Road cycling	B
Phillipa Gray	New Zealand	Track cycling	B
Nati Groberg	Israel	Road cycling	H4
Liang Guihua	China	Road cycling	C2
Liang Guihua	China	Track cycling	C2
Henrike Handrup	Germany	Road cycling	B
Henrike Handrup	Germany	Track cycling	B
Anna Harkowska	Poland	Road cycling	C5
Anna Harkowska	Poland	Track cycling	C5
Masashi Ishii	Japan	Road cycling	C4
Masashi Ishii	Japan	Track cycling	C4
Morten Jahr	Norway	Road cycling	C4
Morten Jahr	Norway	Track cycling	C4
Dax Jaikel	Costa Rica	Road cycling	C4
Vladislav Janovjak	Slovakia	Road cycling	B
Joël Jeannot	France	Road cycling	H3
Bernd Jeffre	Germany	Road cycling	H3
Jiří Ježek	Czech Republic	Road cycling	C4
Jiří Ježek	Czech Republic	Track cycling	C4
Anthony Kappes	Great Britain	Track cycling	B
Krzysztof Kosikowski	Poland	Road cycling	B
Robert Labbe	Canada	Road cycling	H1
Mark Ledo	Canada	Road cycling	H3
Gaysli Leon	Haiti	Road cycling	H3
Bryce Lindores	Australia	Road cycling	B
Bryce Lindores	Australia	Track cycling	B
Koby Lion	Israel	Road cycling	H1
Edward Maalouf	Lebanon	Road cycling	H2
Aileen McGlynn	Great Britain	Road cycling	B
Aileen McGlynn	Great Britain	Track cycling	B
Shaun McKeown	Great Britain	Road cycling	C3
Shaun McKeown	Great Britain	Track cycling	C3
Vico Merklein	Germany	Road cycling	H3
Kieran Modra	Australia	Road cycling	B
Kieran Modra	Australia	Track cycling	B
Rachel Morris	Great Britain	Road cycling	H3
Alberto Lujan Nattkemper	Argentina	Road cycling	B
Alberto Lujan Nattkemper	Argentina	Track cycling	B
Jaco Nel	South Africa	Road cycling	C2
Jaco Nel	South Africa	Track cycling	C2
Kadidia Nikiema	Burkina Faso	Road cycling	H3
Carol-Eduard Novak	Romania	Road cycling	C4
Carol-Eduard Novak	Romania	Track cycling	C4
Jarmo Ollanketo	Finland	Road cycling	B
Rinne Oost	Netherlands	Road cycling	B
Rinne Oost	Netherlands	Track cycling	B
Aitor Oroza Flores	Spain	Road cycling	T1
Tatsuyuki Oshiro	Japan	Track cycling	B
Jayme Paris	Australia	Road cycling	C1
Jayme Paris	Australia	Track cycling	C1
Steven Peace	United States	Road cycling	T2
Anthony Pedeferri	United States	Road cycling	H1
Milan Petrovic	Serbia	Road cycling	B
Ivano Pizzi	Italy	Road cycling	B
Vittorio Podestà	Italy	Road cycling	H2
Jose Enrique Porto Lareo	Spain	Road cycling	B
Susan Powell	Australia	Road cycling	C4
Susan Powell	Australia	Track cycling	C4
Clark Rachfal	United States	Road cycling	B
Clark Rachfal	United States	Track cycling	B
Koen Reyserhove	Belgium	Road cycling	C4
Koen Reyserhove	Belgium	Track cycling	C4
Mark Rohan	Ireland	Road cycling	H1
Anita Ruetz	Austria	Road cycling	C2
Anita Ruetz	Austria	Track cycling	C2
Wolfgang Schattauer	Austria	Road cycling	H1
Alan Schmidt	Denmark	Road cycling	T1
Zeng Sini	China	Road cycling	C2
Zeng Sini	China	Track cycling	C2
Enda Smyth	Ireland	Road cycling	C3
Enda Smyth	Ireland	Track cycling	C3
Fiona Southorn	New Zealand	Road cycling	C5
Fiona Southorn	New Zealand	Track cycling	C5
Christos Stefanakis	Greece	Road cycling	B
Christos Stefanakis	Greece	Track cycling	B
David Stone	Great Britain	Road cycling	T2
Sarah Storey	Great Britain	Road cycling	C5
Sarah Storey	Great Britain	Track cycling	C5
Michael Teuber	Germany	Road cycling	B
Michael Teuber	Germany	Track cycling	B
Sara Tretola	Switzerland	Road cycling	C5
Sara Tretola	Switzerland	Track cycling	C5
Matthew Updike	United States	Road cycling	H2
Christian Venge	Spain	Road cycling	B
Christian Venge	Spain	Track cycling	B
Gerhard Viljoen	South Africa	Road cycling	T2
David Vondracek	Czech Republic	Road cycling	T2
Mohd Khairul Hazwan Wahab	Malaysia	Road cycling	B
Catherine Walsh	Ireland	Road cycling	B
Catherine Walsh	Ireland	Track cycling	B
Robbi Weldon	Canada	Road cycling	B
Robbi Weldon	Canada	Track cycling	B
Rafal Wilk	Poland	Road cycling	H3
Erich Winkler	Germany	Road cycling	C1
Erich Winkler	Germany	Track cycling	C1
Anthony Zahn	United States	Road cycling	C1
Anthony Zahn	United States	Track cycling	C1
Alessandro Zanardi	Italy	Road cycling	H4
Li Zhang Yu	China	Road cycling	C1
Li Zhang Yu	China	Track cycling	C1

== See also ==
- List of cyclists at the 2012 Summer Olympics
