= 2011 UCI Para-cycling Track World Championships – Women's time trial =

Rainbow jersey

The women's time trial was part of the 2011 UCI Para-cycling Track World Championships, held in Montichiari, Italy, in March 2011.

Cyclists classified as C1, C2, C4 and C5 (locomotor disability) rode a 500 m time trial, while Tandem-B (visual impairment) rode a 1 km time trial.

== Medalists ==
There were no medals awarded in the classification C1 event, as there was only one contestant.

Class	Gold	Silver	Bronze
C2	Qi Tang; China	Bianbian Sun; China	Allison Jones; United States
C4	Jianping Ruan; China	Susan Powell; Australia	Yaping Ye; China
C5	Sarah Storey; United Kingdom	Ju Fang Zhou; China	Jennifer Schuble; United States
B	Stephanie Morton, Felicity Johnson; Australia	Helen Scott, Aileen McGlynn; United Kingdom	Sonia Waddell, Jayne Parsons; New Zealand

== C1 ==
The Final was held on 13 March.

- C1 - locomotor disability: Neurological, or amputation

=== Final ===
Rank	Name	Nation	Time
1	Jayme Paris	Australia	47.236

== C2 ==
The Final was held on 13 March.

- C2 - locomotor disability: Neurological, decrease in muscle strength, or amputation

=== Final ===
Rank	Name	Nation	Time
1st place, gold medalist(s)	Qi Tang	China	45.373
2nd place, silver medalist(s)	Bianbian Sun	China	45.412
3rd place, bronze medalist(s)	Allison Jones	United States	46.276
4	Raquel Acinas Poncelas	Spain	47.651
5	Yvonne Marzinke	Germany	48.319
6	Barbara Buchan	United States	51.186
7	Danijela Jovanovic	Serbia	1:03.711

== C4 ==
The Final was held on 13 March.

- C4 - locomotor disability: Neurological, or amputation

=== Final ===
Rank	Name	Nation	Time
1st place, gold medalist(s)	Jianping Ruan	China	39.359
2nd place, silver medalist(s)	Susan Powell	Australia	41.347
3rd place, bronze medalist(s)	Ya Ping Ye	China	41.922
4	Roxanne Burns	South Africa	43.651
5	Marie-Claude Molnar	Canada	44.160
6	Alexandra Green	Australia	46.353

== C5 ==
The Final was held on 13 March.

- C5 - locomotor disability: Neurological, or amputation

=== Final ===
Rank	Name	Nation	Time
1st place, gold medalist(s)	Sarah Storey	United Kingdom	37.733
2nd place, silver medalist(s)	Ju Fang Zhou	China	38.506
3rd place, bronze medalist(s)	Jennifer Schuble	United States	38.615
4	Greta Neimanas	United States	39.480
5	Qing Guo	China	41.574
6	Anna Harkowska	Poland	41.603
7	Fiona Southorn	New Zealand	42.985
8	Kerstin Brachtendorf	Germany	43.948
9	Sara Tretola	Switzerland	44.949
10	Michaela Bitsch	Germany	45.245
11	Trix Schwedler	Ireland	47.272

== Tandem B ==
The Final was held on 11 March.

- Tandem B - visual impairment

=== Final ===
Rank	Name	Nation	Time
1st place, gold medalist(s)	Felicity Johnson, Stephanie Morton	Australia	1:09.393
2nd place, silver medalist(s)	Aileen McGlynn, Helen Scott	United Kingdom	1:09.474
3rd place, bronze medalist(s)	Jayne Parsons, Sonia Waddell	New Zealand	1:11.835
4	Karissa Whitsell, Mackenzie Woodring	United States	1:12.673
5	Phillipa Gray, Laura Thomson	New Zealand	1:12.688
6	Lora Turnham, Fiona Duncan	United Kingdom	1:12.787
7	Henrike Handrup, Ellen Heiny	Germany	1:12.923
8	Brandie O'Connor, Kerry Knowler	Australia	1:13.301
9	Catherine Walsh, Francine Meehan	Ireland	1:13.520
10	Kathrin Goeken, Kim van Dijk	Netherlands	1:14.775
11	Adamantia Chalkiadaki, Argyro Milaki	Greece	1:16.162
12	Genevieve Ouellet, Emilie Roy	Canada	1:16.427
13	Carrie Willoughby, Shelby Reynolds	United States	1:16.521
14	Cinzia Coluzzi, Annamaria Scafetta	Italy	1:17.271
15	Joleen Hakker, Samantha Van Steenis	Netherlands	1:17.872

== See also ==
- 2011 UCI Track Cycling World Championships – Women's 500 m time trial
