= Cycling at the 2012 Summer Paralympics – Women's time trial =

The women's time trial track cycling events at the 2012 Summer Paralympics took place on 30 August – 1 September at London Velopark.

== Classification ==
Cyclists are given a classification depending on the type and extent of their disability. The classification system allows cyclists to compete against others with a similar level of function. The class number indicates the severity of impairment with "1" being most impaired.

Track cycling classes are:

- B: Blind and visually impaired cyclists use a tandem bicycle with a sighted pilot on the front.
- C 1–5: Cyclists with an impairment that affects their legs, arms and/or trunk, but are capable of using a standard bicycle.

== B ==
The women's 1 km time trial (B) took place on 31 August. PR = Paralympic Record

Rank	Name	Country	Time
1st place, gold medalist(s)	Felicity Johnson; Pilot: Stephanie Morton	Australia	1:08.919 PR
2nd place, silver medalist(s)	Aileen McGlynn; Pilot: Helen Scott	Great Britain	1:09.469
3rd place, bronze medalist(s)	Phillipa Gray; Pilot: Laura Thompson	New Zealand	1:11.245
4	Lora Turnham; Pilot: Fiona Duncan	Great Britain	1:11.479
5	Catherine Walsh; Pilot: Francine Meehan	Ireland	1:12.864

== C1–3 ==
The women's 500 m time trial (C1–3) took place on 1 September.

WR = World Record

Rank	Name	Country	Class	Factored time
1st place, gold medalist(s)	He Yin	China	C2	39.158 WR
2nd place, silver medalist(s)	Alyda Norbruis	Netherlands	C2	39.174
3rd place, bronze medalist(s)	Jayme Paris	Australia	C1	40.476 WR
4	Allison Jones	United States	C2	41.887
5	Zeng Sini	China	C2	43.207
6	Simone Kennedy	Australia	C3	43.892
7	Raquel Acinas Poncelas	Spain	C2	44.159
8	Anita Ruetz	Austria	C2	45.850
9	Tereza Diepoldova	Czech Republic	C2	46.578

== C4–5 ==
The women's 500 m time trial (C4–5) took place on 1 September.

Rank	Name	Country	Class	Factored time
1st place, gold medalist(s)	Sarah Storey	Great Britain	C5	36.997
2nd place, silver medalist(s)	Jennifer Schuble	United States	C5	37.941
3rd place, bronze medalist(s)	Ruan Jianping	China	C4	38.194 WR
4	Anna Harkowska	Poland	C5	39.599
5	Greta Neimanas	United States	C5	39.621
6	Susan Powell	Australia	C4	39.702
7	Fiona Southorn	New Zealand	C5	41.796
8	Alexandra Green	Australia	C4	42.095
