= Cycling at the 2012 Summer Paralympics – Women's road time trial =

The women's road time trial cycling events at the 2012 Summer Paralympics took place on 5 September at Brands Hatch.

== Classification ==
Cyclists are given a classification depending on the type and extent of their disability. The classification system allows cyclists to compete against others with a similar level of function. The class number indicates the severity of impairment with "1" being most impaired.

Cycling classes are:

- B: Blind and visually impaired cyclists use a Tandem bicycle with a sighted pilot on the front.
- H 1–4: Cyclists with an impairment that affects their legs use a handcycle.
- T 1–2: Cyclists with an impairment that affects their balance use a tricycle.
- C 1–5: Cyclists with an impairment that affects their legs, arms and/or trunk, but are capable of using a standard bicycle.

== B ==
| Gold | Silver | Bronze |
| Kathrin Goeken; Kim van Dijk; Netherlands | Phillipa Gray; Laura Thompson; New Zealand | Catherine Walsh; Francine Meehan; Ireland |

== H1–2 ==
| Gold | Silver | Bronze |
| Marianna Davis; United States | Karen Darke; Great Britain | Ursula Schwaller; Switzerland |

== H3 ==
| Gold | Silver | Bronze |
| Sandra Graf; Switzerland | Monica Bascio; United States | Svetlana Moshkovich; Russia |

== H4 ==
| Gold | Silver | Bronze |
| Andrea Eskau; Germany | Dorothee Vieth; Germany | Laura de Vaan; Netherlands |

== C1–3 ==
| Gold | Silver | Bronze |
| Allison Jones; United States | Tereza Diepoldova; Czech Republic | Zeng Sini; China |

== C4 ==
| Gold | Silver | Bronze |
| Megan Fisher; United States | Susan Powell; Australia | Marie-Claude Molnar; Canada |

== C5 ==
| Gold | Silver | Bronze |
| Sarah Storey; Great Britain | Anna Harkowska; Poland | Kelly Crowley; United States |
