= Cycling at the 2012 Summer Paralympics =

Cycling at the XIV Paralympic Games
- Pictograms for road (left) and track cycling (right)
- Venue: London Velopark; Brands Hatch
- Dates: 5 – 8 September 2012

Cycling at the 2012 Summer Paralympics consisted of 50 events in two main disciplines, track cycling and road cycling. Track cycling was held in London Velopark from 30 August to 2 September, and road cycling took place at Brands Hatch from September 5 to September 8.

== Classification ==
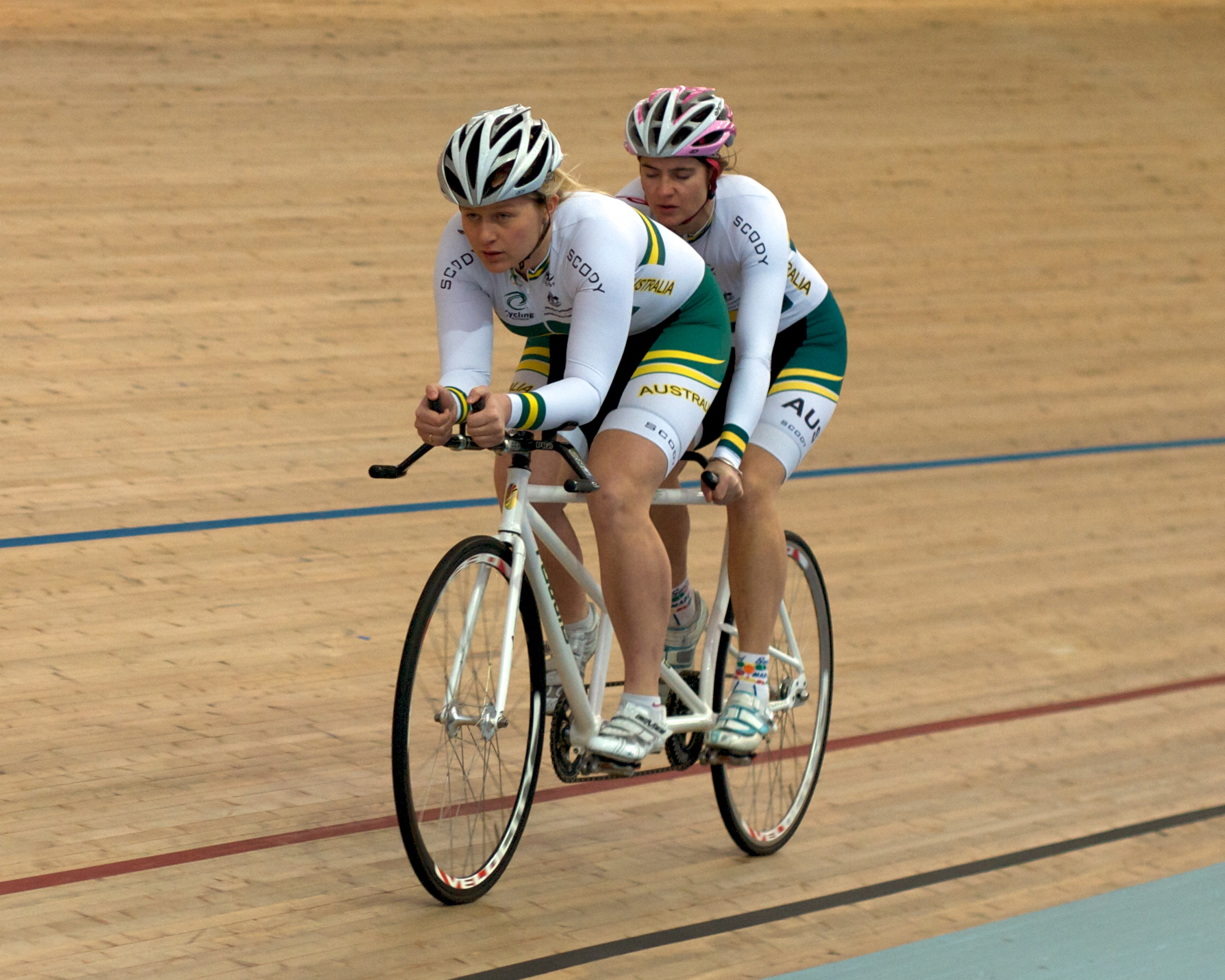
A tandem bicycle, with Stephanie Morton acting as Felicity Johnson's pilot.

Cyclists are given a classification depending on the type and extent of their disability. The classification system allows cyclists to compete against others with a similar level of function. The class number indicates the severity of impairment with "1" being most impaired.

Cycling classes are:

- B: Blind and visually impaired cyclists use a Tandem bicycle with a sighted pilot on the front - both athletes are awarded medals
- H 1–4: Cyclists with an impairment that affects their legs use a handcycle
- T 1–2: Cyclists with an impairment that affects their balance use a tricycle
- C 1-5: Cyclists with an impairment that affects their legs, arms and/or trunk but are capable of using a standard bicycle

== Events ==
For each of the events below, medals are contested for one or more of the above classifications.

=== Road cycling ===
- Men's individual road race

• B • H1 • H2
• H3 • H4 • C1-3
• C4-5

- Men's individual time trial

• B • H1 • H2 • H3
• H4 • C1 • C2
• C3 • C4 • C5

- Women's individual road race

• B • H1-3 • H4
• C1-3 • C4-5

- Women's individual time trial

• B • H1-2 • H3
• H4 • C1-3 • C4
• C5

- Mixed individual road race

• T1-2

- Mixed individual time trial

• T1-2

- Mixed team relay

• H1-4

=== Track cycling ===
- Men's 1 km time trial

• B • C1-3 • C4-5

- Men's individual pursuit

• B • C1 • C2
• C3 • C4 • C5

- Men's individual sprint

• B

- Women's 500m time trial

• C1-3 • C4-5

- Women's 1 km time trial

• B

- Women's individual pursuit

• B • C1-3 • C4
• C5

- Mixed team sprint

• C1-5

== Participating nations ==
223 cyclists from 48 nations including 37 guides from 20 selected nations competed.

- Albania (1)
- Argentina (2) + 1 pilot
- Australia (12) + 3 pilots
- Austria (7)
- Belarus (1) + 1 pilot
- Belgium (4)
- Brazil (2)
- Burkina Faso (2)
- Canada (12) + 3 pilots
- China (8)
- Colombia (3)
- Costa Rica (1)
- Croatia (2)
- Cuba (1)
- Czech Republic (8)
- Denmark (2)
- Dominican Republic (1)
- Finland (1) + 1 pilot
- France (11) + 3 pilots
- Germany (15) + 1 pilot
- Ghana (1)
- Great Britain (15) + 4 pilots
- Greece (3) + 2 pilots
- Haiti (1)
- Iran (1)
- Ireland (7) + 3 pilots
- Israel (3)
- Italy (12) + 1 pilot
- Japan (3) + 1 pilot
- Lebanon (1)
- Malaysia (1) + 1 pilot
- Netherlands (8) + 3 pilots
- New Zealand (1) + 1 pilot
- Norway (2)
- Poland (5) + 1 pilot
- Romania (2)
- Russia (2)
- Serbia (1) + 1 pilot
- Slovakia (5) + 1 pilot
- Slovenia (1)
- South Africa (6)
- South Korea (2)
- Spain (12) + 4 pilots
- Sweden (1)
- Switzerland (8)
- Ukraine (1)
- United States (16) + 1 pilot
- Venezuela (2)

== Medal summary ==
=== Medal table ===
Rank	Nation	Gold	Silver	Bronze	Total
1	Great Britain (GBR)	8	9	5	22
2	United States (USA)	6	5	6	17
3	China (CHN)	6	4	5	15
4	Australia (AUS)	6	4	4	14
5	Germany (GER)	4	7	3	14
6	Italy (ITA)	4	3	3	10
7	Poland (POL)	2	4	0	6
8	Spain (ESP)	2	2	3	7
9	Switzerland (SUI)	2	2	2	6
10	Ireland (IRL)	2	1	2	5
11	Ukraine (UKR)	2	0	0	2
12	Netherlands (NED)	1	2	3	6
13	Czech Republic (CZE)	1	2	2	5
14	Austria (AUT)	1	1	2	4
14	New Zealand (NZL)	1	1	2	4
16	Romania (ROU)	1	1	0	2
17	Canada (CAN)	1	0	1	2
18	Israel (ISR)	0	1	0	1
18	South Africa (RSA)	0	1	0	1
20	France (FRA)	0	0	2	2
21	Argentina (ARG)	0	0	1	1
21	Belgium (BEL)	0	0	1	1
21	Japan (JPN)	0	0	1	1
21	Russia (RUS)	0	0	1	1
21	Slovakia (SVK)	0	0	1	1
Totals (25 entries)		50	50	50	150

=== Road cycling ===
==== Men's events ====
Event	Class	Gold	Silver	Bronze
Time trial	B	Christian Venge; Spain	Ivano Pizzi; Italy	James Brown; Ireland
Time trial	H1	Mark Rohan; Ireland	Koby Lion; Israel	Wolfgang Schattauer; Austria
Time trial	H2	Heinz Frei; Switzerland	Walter Ablinger; Austria	Vittorio Podestà; Italy
Time trial	H3	Rafał Wilk; Poland	Nigel Barley; Australia	Bernd Jeffre; Germany
Time trial	H4	Alessandro Zanardi; Italy	Norbert Mosandl; Germany	Oscar Sanchez; United States
Time trial	C1	Michael Teuber; Germany	Mark Colbourne; Great Britain	Zhang Yu Li; China
Time trial	C2	Tobias Graf; Germany	Guihua Liang; China	Maurice Eckhard Tió; Spain
Time trial	C3	David Nicholas; Australia	Joseph Berenyi; United States	Masaki Fujita; Japan
Time trial	C4	Jiří Ježek; Czech Republic	Carol-Eduard Novak; Romania	Jiří Bouška; Czech Republic
Time trial	C5	Yegor Dementyev; Ukraine	Xinyang Liu; China	Michael Gallagher; Australia
Road race	B	Ivano Pizzi; Italy	Krzysztof Kosikowski; Poland	Vladislav Janovjak; Slovakia
Road race	H1	Mark Rohan; Ireland	Tobias Fankhauser; Switzerland	Wolfgang Schattauer; Austria
Road race	H2	Walter Ablinger; Austria	Jean-Marc Berset; Switzerland	Vittorio Podestà; Italy
Road race	H3	Rafał Wilk; Poland	Vico Merklein; Germany	Joël Jeannot; France
Road race	H4	Alessandro Zanardi; Italy	Ernst van Dyk; South Africa	Wim Decleir; Belgium
Road race	C1-3	Roberto Bargna; Italy	Steffen Warias; Germany	David Nicholas; Australia
Road race	C4-5	Yegor Dementyev; Ukraine	Xinyang Liu; China	Michele Pittacolo; Italy

==== Women's events ====
Event	Class	Gold	Silver	Bronze
Time trial	B	Kathrin Goeken; Netherlands	Phillipa Gray; New Zealand	Catherine Walsh; Ireland
Time trial	H1-2	Marianna Davis; United States	Karen Darke; Great Britain	Ursula Schwaller; Switzerland
Time trial	H3	Sandra Graf; Switzerland	Monica Bascio; United States	Svetlana Moshkovich; Russia
Time trial	H4	Andrea Eskau; Germany	Dorothee Vieth; Germany	Laura de Vaan; Netherlands
Time trial	C1-3	Allison Jones; United States	Tereza Diepoldová; Czech Republic	Sini Zeng; China
Time trial	C4	Megan Fisher; United States	Susan Powell; Australia	Marie-Claude Molnar; Canada
Time trial	C5	Sarah Storey; Great Britain	Anna Harkowska; Poland	Kelly Crowley; United States
Road race	B	Robbi Weldon; Canada	Josefa Benitez Guzman; Spain	Kathrin Goeken; Netherlands
Road race	H1-3	Marianna Davis; United States	Monica Bascio; United States	Rachel Morris; Great Britain
Road race	H4	Andrea Eskau; Germany	Laura de Vaan; Netherlands	Dorothee Vieth; Germany
Road race	C1-3	Sini Zeng; China	Denise Schindler; Germany	Allison Jones; United States
Road race	C4-5	Sarah Storey; Great Britain	Anna Harkowska; Poland	Kelly Crowley; United States

==== Mixed events ====
Event	Class	Gold	Silver	Bronze
Time trial	T1-2	Carol Cooke; Australia	Hans-Peter Durst; Germany	David Stone; Great Britain
Road race	T1-2	David Stone; Great Britain	Giorgio Farroni; Italy	David Vondracek; Czech Republic
Team Relay	H1-4	United States (USA); Marianna Davis; Oscar Sanchez; Matthew Updike	Italy (ITA); Alex Zanardi; Vittorio Podesta; Francesca Fenocchio	Switzerland (SUI); Jean-Marc Berset; Ursula Schwaller; Heinz Frei

=== Track cycling ===
==== Men's events ====
Event	Class	Gold	Silver	Bronze
1 km time trial	B	Neil Fachie; Great Britain	José Enrique Porto Lareo; Spain	Rinne Oost; Netherlands
1 km time trial	C1-3	Zhang Yu Li; China	Mark Colbourne; Great Britain	Tobias Graf; Germany
1 km time trial	C4-5	Alfonso Cabello; Spain	Jon-Allan Butterworth; Great Britain	Xinyang Liu; China
Individual pursuit	B	Kieran Modra; Australia	Bryce Lindores; Australia	Miguel Ángel Clemente Solano; Spain
Individual pursuit	C1	Mark Colbourne; Great Britain	Zhang Yu Li; China	Rodrigo Fernando López; Argentina
Individual pursuit	C2	Guihua Liang; China	Tobias Graf; Germany	Laurent Thirionet; France
Individual pursuit	C3	Joseph Berenyi; United States	Shaun McKeown; Great Britain	Darren Kenny; Great Britain
Individual pursuit	C4	Carol-Eduard Novak; Romania	Jiří Ježek; Czech Republic	Jody Cundy; Great Britain
Individual pursuit	C5	Michael Gallagher; Australia	Jon-Allan Butterworth; Great Britain	Liu Xinyang; China
Individual Sprint	B	Anthony Kappes; Great Britain	Neil Fachie; Great Britain	José Enrique Porto Lareo; Spain

==== Women's events ====
Event	Class	Gold	Silver	Bronze
Time trial	C1-3 (500 m)	He Yin; China	Alyda Norbruis; Netherlands	Jayme Paris; Australia
Time trial	C4-5 (500 m)	Sarah Storey; Great Britain	Jennifer Schuble; United States	Jianping Ruan; China
Time trial	B (1 km)	Felicity Johnson; Australia	Aileen McGlynn; Great Britain	Phillipa Gray; New Zealand
Individual pursuit	B	Phillipa Gray; New Zealand	Catherine Walsh; Ireland	Aileen McGlynn; Great Britain
Individual pursuit	C1-3	Sini Zeng; China	Simone Kennedy; Australia	Allison Jones; United States
Individual pursuit	C4	Susan Powell; Australia	Megan Fisher; United States	Alexandra Green; Australia
Individual pursuit	C5	Sarah Storey; Great Britain	Anna Harkowska; Poland	Fiona Southorn; New Zealand

==== Mixed events ====
Event	Class	Gold	Silver	Bronze
Team Sprint	C1-5	China (CHN); Xiaofei Ji; Xinyang Liu; Hao Xie	Great Britain (GBR); Jon-Allan Butterworth; Darren Kenny; Richard Waddon	United States (USA); Joseph Berenyi; Sam Kavanagh; Jennifer Schuble

== See also ==
- Cycling at the 2012 Summer Olympics
