= Cycling at the 2012 Summer Paralympics – Women's individual pursuit =

The women's individual pursuit events at the 2012 Summer Paralympics took place on 30 August – 2 September at London Velopark.

== Classification ==
Cyclists are given a classification depending on the type and extent of their disability. The classification system allows cyclists to compete against others with a similar level of function. The class number indicates the severity of impairment with "1" being most impaired.

Pursuit cycling classes are:

- B: Blind and visually impaired cyclists use a tandem bicycle with a sighted pilot on the front.
- C 1–5: Cyclists with an impairment that affects their legs, arms and/or trunk, but are capable of using a standard bicycle.

== B ==
The women's 3 km individual pursuit (B) took place on 2 September.

Gold	Silver	Bronze
Phillipa Gray; Pilot: Laura Thompson; New Zealand	Catherine Walsh; Pilot: Francine Meehan; Ireland	Aileen McGlynn; Pilot: Helen Scott; Great Britain

== C1–3 ==
The women's 3 km individual pursuit (C1–3) took place on 30 August.

Gold	Silver	Bronze
Zeng Sini; China	Simone Kennedy; Australia	Allison Jones; United States

== C4 ==
The women's 3 km individual pursuit (C4) took place on 30 August.

Gold	Silver	Bronze
Susan Powell; Australia	Megan Fisher; United States	Alexandra Green; Australia

== C5 ==
The women's 3 km individual pursuit (C5) took place on 30 August.

Gold	Silver	Bronze
Sarah Storey; Great Britain	Anna Harkowska; Poland	Fiona Southorn; New Zealand
