= Cycling at the 2012 Summer Paralympics – Women's 1 km time trial B =

Cycling, Women's 1 km time trial B at the XIV Paralympic Games
- Venue: London Velopark
- Dates: August 31, 2012
- Competitors: 8 from 6 nations
- Winning time: 1:08.919

Medalists
| 1st place, gold medalist(s) | | Felicity Johnson; Stephanie Morton | Australia |
| 2nd place, silver medalist(s) | | Aileen McGlynn; Helen Scott | Great Britain |
| 3rd place, bronze medalist(s) | | Phillipa Gray; Laura Thompson | New Zealand |

The Women's 1 km time trial, Class B track cycling event at the 2012 Summer Paralympics took place on August 31 at London Velopark. This class is for blind and visually impaired cyclists riding with a sighted pilot.

== Results ==
PR = Paralympic Record

| Rank | Name | Country | Time |
|---|---|---|---|
| 1st place, gold medalist(s) | Felicity Johnson; Pilot: Stephanie Morton | Australia | 1:08.919 PR |
| 2nd place, silver medalist(s) | Aileen McGlynn; Pilot: Helen Scott | Great Britain | 1:09.469 |
| 3rd place, bronze medalist(s) | Phillipa Gray; Pilot: Laura Thompson | New Zealand | 1:11.245 |
| 4 | Lora Turnham; Pilot: Fiona Duncan | Great Britain | 1:11.479 |
| 5 | Catherine Walsh; Pilot: Francine Meehan | Ireland | 1:12.864 |
| 6 | Henrike Handrup; Pilot: Ellen Heiny | Germany | 1:13.416 |
| 7 | Katie George Dunlevy; Pilot: Sandra Fitzgerald | Ireland | 1:14.315 |
| 8 | Adamantia Chalkiadaki; Pilot: Argyro Milaki | Greece | 1:17.619 |
