= Cycling at the 2012 Summer Paralympics – Women's individual pursuit B =

Cycling, Women's Ind. Pursuit B at the XIV Paralympic Games
- Venue: ExCeL Exhibition Centre
- Dates: September 2
- Competitors: 11 from 9 nations

Medalists
1st place, gold medalist(s)		Phillipa Gray; Laura Thompson	New Zealand
2nd place, silver medalist(s)		Catherine Walsh; Francine Meehan	Ireland
3rd place, bronze medalist(s)		Aileen McGlynn; Helen Scott	Great Britain

The Women's Individual Pursuit B track cycling event at the 2012 Summer Paralympics took place on September 2 at London Velopark. This class was for blind and visually impaired cyclists riding with a sighted pilot. Eleven pairs from nine different nations competed.

The competition began with five head to head races and one unpaired ride between the eleven riders. These races were held over a 3000m course and each rider was given a time for their race. The fastest two riders were advanced to the gold medal final whilst the third and fourth fastest times raced it out for the bronze.

== Preliminaries ==
WR = World Record

Rank	Name	Country	Time
1	Phillipa Gray; Pilot: Laura Thompson	New Zealand	3:31.530; WR
2	Catherine Walsh; Pilot: Francine Meehan	Ireland	3:36.453
3	Aileen McGlynn; Pilot: Helen Scott	Great Britain	3:36.930
4	Lora Turnham; Pilot: Fiona Duncan	Great Britain	3:37.085
5	Katie George Dunlevy; Pilot: Sandra Fitzgerald	Ireland	3:42.445
6	Josefa Benitez Guzman; Pilot: Maria Noriega	Spain	3:43.335
7	Robbi Weldon; Pilot: Lyne Bessette	Canada	3:45.698
8	Henrike Handrup; Pilot: Ellen Heiny	Germany	3:46.697
9	Felicity Johnson; Pilot: Stephanie Morton	Australia	3:51.103
10	Iryna Fiadotova; Pilot: Alena Drazdova	Belarus	4:01.417
11	Adamantia Chalkiadaki; Pilot: Argyro Milaki	Greece	4:01.449

== Finals ==
Gold medal match

Name	Time	Rank
Phillipa Gray (NZL); Pilot: Laura Thompson (NZL)	3:32.243	1st place, gold medalist(s)
Catherine Walsh (IRL); Pilot: Francine Meehan (IRL)	3:36.360	2nd place, silver medalist(s)

Bronze medal match

Name	Time	Rank
Aileen McGlynn (GBR); Pilot: Helen Scott (GBR)	3:40.138	3rd place, bronze medalist(s)
Lora Turnham (GBR); Pilot: Fiona Duncan (GBR)	3:41.147	4
