= 2016 UCI Para-cycling Track World Championships =

Track cycling tournament

- Venue: Montichiari, Italy
- Date: 17–20 March 2016
- Velodrome: Montichiari Velodrome
- Nations participating: 32
- Cyclists participating: 215
- Events: 31

The 2016 UCI Para-cycling Track World Championships were the World Championships for track cycling where athletes with a physical disability. The Championships took place at the Montichiari Velodrome in Montichiari, Italy from 17 to 20 March 2016. Great Britain were the most successful team of the competition in total medals (18) and in number of gold medals (8). The Championships saw 11 new world records set.

== Classification ==
Sport class

- Cycling
  - C1 - locomotor disability: Neurological, or amputation
  - C2 - locomotor disability: Neurological, decrease in muscle strength, or amputation
  - C3 - locomotor disability: Neurological, or amputation
  - C4 - locomotor disability: Neurological, or amputation
  - C5 - locomotor disability: Neurological, or amputation
- Tandem
  - Tandem B - visual impairment

== Event winners ==
Event	Class	Gold		Silver		Bronze	
Men's events
Sprint	Tandem B	Neil Fachie; Peter Mitchell (pilot); Great Britain		Tristan Bangma; Teun Mulder (pilot); Netherlands		James Ball; Craig MacLean (pilot); Great Britain	
1km time trial	C1	Arnoud Nijhuis; Netherlands	1:12.423 WR	Li Zhangyu; China	1:12.597	Rodrigo Fernando Lopez; Argentina	1:20.296
1km time trial	C2	Tristen Chernove; Canada	1:13.279	Xie Hao; China	1:15.311	Louis Rolfe; Great Britain	1:15.925
1km time trial	C3	Joseph Berenyi; United States	1:09.534	Alexsey Obydennov; Russia	1:10.120	Sergey Batukov; Russia; Eduardo Santas Asensio; Spain	1:10.317
1km time trial	C4	Jody Cundy; United Kingdom	1:04.654	Jozef Metelka; Slovakia	1:06.046	Wei Guoping; China	1:08.590
1km time trial	C5	Alfonso Cabello; Spain	1:05.045	Jon-Allan Butterworth; Great Britain	1:05.549	Alistair Donohoe; Australia	1:05.629
1km time trial	Tandem B	Neil Fachie; Peter Mitchell (pilot); Great Britain	1:00.633	Tristan Bangma; Teun Mulder (pilot); Netherlands	1:01.780	Stephen De Vries; Patrick Bos (pilot); Netherlands	1:02.214
3km pursuit	C1	Li Zhangyu†; China	3:55.352	Ross Wislon; Canada	3:58.141	Arnoud Nijhuis; Netherlands	
3km pursuit	C2	Tristen Chernove; Canada	3:44.498	Colin Lynch; Ireland	3:53.694	Arslan Gilmutdinov; Russia	
3km pursuit	C3	Joseph Berenyi; United States	3:35.569	David Nicholas; Australia	3:36.371	Eoghan Clifford; Ireland	
4km pursuit	C4	Jozef Metelka ††; Slovakia	4:28.000	Kyle Bridgwood; Australia	4:36.296	Sergey Pudov; Russia	
4km pursuit	C5	Michael Gallagher; Australia	4:38.467	Alistair Donohoe; Australia	4:38.520	Yegor Dementyev; Ukraine	
4km pursuit	Tandem B	Kieran Modra; David Edwards (pilot); Australia	4:12.324	Ignacio Avila Rodriguez; Joan Font Bertoli (pilot); Spain	4:16.406	Daniel Chalifour; Jean-Michel Lachance (pilot); Canada	
Scratch race	C1-C3	Alexsey Obydennov; Russia		Fabio Anobile; Italy		Esneider Munoz Marin; Colombia	
Scratch race	C4-C5	Kyle Bridgwood; Australia		Jonathan Gildea; Great Britain		Alistair Donohoe; Australia	
Women's events
Sprint	Tandem B	Jessica Gallagher†††; Madison Janssen (pilot); Australia		Sophie Thornhill; Helen Scott (pilot); Great Britain		Larissa Klaassen; Haliegh Dolman (pilot); Netherlands	
500m time trial	C1	Li Jieli; China	44.439 WR				
500m time trial	C2	Alyda Norbruis; Netherlands	40.260	Amanda Reid; Australia	42.147	Zhenling Song; China	44.237
500m time trial	C3	Megan Giglia; Great Britain	41.761 WR	Denise Schindler; Germany	43.159	Jamie Whitmore; United States	43.784
500m time trial	C4	Kadeena Cox; Great Britain	37.456 WR	Ruan Jianping; China	37.835	Katherine Horan; New Zealand	39.730
500m time trial	C5	Jufang Zhou; China	37.389	Sarah Storey; Great Britain	37.589	Crystal Lane; Great Britain	37.796
1km time trial	Tandem B	Larissa Klaassen; Haliegh Dolman (pilot); Netherlands	1:06.095	Sophie Thornhill; Helen Scott (pilot); Great Britain	1:07.483	Jessica Gallagher; Madison Janssen (pilot); Australia	1:07.575
3km pursuit	C1	Li Jieli; China	4:45.304				
3km pursuit	C2	Zeng Sini; China	4:13.373	Alyda Norbruis; Netherlands	4:14.184	Daniela Munévar; Colombia	
3km pursuit	C3	Megan Giglia‡ Great Britain	4:09.367	Denise Schindler; Germany	4:13.947	Simone Kennedy; Australia	
3km pursuit	C4	Shawn Morelli; United States	3:55.006 WR	Susan Powell; Australia	3:59.279	Alexandra Lisney; Australia	
3km pursuit	C5	Sarah Storey‡‡ Great Britain	3:38.756	Jufang Zhou; China		Anna Harkowska; Poland	
3km pursuit	Tandem B	Emma Foy; Laura Thompson (pilot); New Zealand	3:30.148	Yurie Kanuma; Mai Tanaka (pilot); Japan	3:35.526	Lora Turnham; Corrine Hall (pilot); Great Britain	
Scratch race	C1-C3	Zeng Sini; China		Daniela Munévar; Colombia		Denise Schindler; Germany	
Scratch race	C4-C5	Anna Harkowska; Poland		Sarah Storey; Great Britain		Mariela Delgado; Argentina	
Mixed events
Team sprint	C1–5	Louis Rolfe; Jon-Allan Butterworth; Jody Cundy; Great Britain	49.230 WR	Hao Xie; Guoping Wei; Xinyang Liu; China	49.530	Amador Granados Alkorta; Eduardo Santas Asensio; Alfonso Cabello; Spain	

† Li Zhangyu set a new world record of 3:51.961 in the men's C1 3km Individual Pursuit during the qualification stages.
†† Jozef Metelka set a new world record of 4.26.924 in the men's C4 4km Individual Pursuit during the qualification stages.
††† Jessica Gallagher and Madison Janssen set a new world record of 11.045 in the women's Tandem Sprint during the qualifying stages.
‡Megan Giglia set a new world record of 4:06.756 in the women's C2 3km Individual Pursuit during the qualification stages.
‡‡ Sarah Storey caught Jufang Zhu with five laps to go. Storey's time is that given from her qualification round.

== Medal table ==
Rank	Nation	Gold	Silver	Bronze	Total
1	Great Britain (GBR)	8	6	4	18
2	China (CHN)	6	5	2	13
3	Australia (AUS)	4	5	5	14
4	Netherlands (NED)	3	3	3	9
5	United States (USA)	3	0	1	4
6	Canada (CAN)	2	1	1	4
7	Russia (RUS)	1	1	3	5
8	Spain (ESP)	1	1	2	4
9	Slovakia (SVK)	1	1	0	2
10	New Zealand (NZL)	1	0	1	2
10	Poland (POL)	1	0	1	2
12	Germany (GER)	0	2	1	3
13	Colombia (COL)	0	1	2	3
14	Ireland (IRL)	0	1	1	2
15	Italy (ITA)	0	1	0	1
15	Japan (JPN)	0	1	0	1
17	Argentina (ARG)	0	0	2	2
18	Ukraine (UKR)	0	0	1	1
Totals (18 entries)		31	29	30	90

== Participating nations ==
32 nations participated.

- Argentina
- Australia
- Austria
- Belgium
- Brazil
- Canada
- China
- Colombia
- Czech Republic
- France
- Great Britain
- Germany
- Ghana
- Greece
- Hungary
- Iran
- Ireland
- Italy
- Japan
- Malaysia
- Netherlands
- New Zealand
- Poland
- Romania
- Russia
- South Africa
- South Korea
- Spain
- Switzerland
- Slovakia
- Ukraine
- United States
