= New Zealand at the 2012 Summer Paralympics =

- IPC code: NZL
- NPC: Paralympics New Zealand
- Website: paralympics.org.nz

in London
- Competitors: 24 in 7 sports
- Flag bearers: Michael Johnson (opening); Sophie Pascoe (closing)
- Medals Ranked 21st: Gold 6 Silver 7 Bronze 4 Total 17

Summer Paralympics appearances (overview)
- 1968; 1972; 1976; 1980; 1984; 1988; 1992; 1996; 2000; 2004; 2008; 2012; 2016; 2020; 2024

New Zealand competed at the 2012 Summer Paralympics in London, United Kingdom, from 29 August to 9 September 2012. The country won 17 medals in total, including six gold medals, and finished twenty-first on the medals table.

== Team ==
New Zealand had 23 athletes, plus 1 cycling pilot, competing across 7 sports. It was the nation's smallest team since Barcelona in 1992, in part because it included no representatives in team events such as wheelchair rugby and boccia.

Michael Johnson, New Zealand's most successful Paralympic shooter, carried the flag at the opening ceremony. Sophie Pascoe, who won six swimming medals at the Games, carried the flag at the closing ceremony. Former Paralympic swimmer and gold medallist Duane Kale was the Chef de Mission. Paralympic cyclist Jayne Parsons withdrew from the team after failing her final pre-Games fitness test.

At age 13 years and 8 months, swimmer Nikita Howarth was the youngest member of the team as well as New Zealand's youngest ever Paralympian.

== Medallists ==
Medal	Name	Sport	Event	Date
Gold	Sophie Pascoe	Swimming	Women's 200m individual medley SM10	30 August
Gold	Sophie Pascoe	Swimming	Women's 100m butterfly S10	1 September
Gold	Phillipa Gray; Laura Thompson (pilot)	Cycling	Women's individual pursuit B	2 September
Gold	Cameron Leslie	Swimming	Men's 150m individual medley SM4	2 September
Gold	Sophie Pascoe	Swimming	Women's 100m freestyle S10	6 September
Gold	Mary Fisher	Swimming	Women's 200m individual medley SM11	8 September
Silver	Sophie Pascoe	Swimming	Women's 50m freestyle S10	31 August
Silver	Mary Fisher	Swimming	Women's 100m freestyle S11	31 August
Silver	Mary Fisher	Swimming	Women's 100m backstroke S11	2 September
Silver	Sophie Pascoe	Swimming	Women's 100m backstroke S10	4 September
Silver	Phillipa Gray; Laura Thompson (pilot)	Cycling	Women's road time trial B	5 September
Silver	Sophie Pascoe	Swimming	Women's 100m breaststroke SB9	8 September
Silver	Daniel Sharp	Swimming	Men's 100m backstroke SB13	8 September
Bronze	Fiona Southorn	Cycling	Women's individual pursuit C5	30 August
Bronze	Phillipa Gray; Laura Thompson (pilot)	Cycling	Women's 1 km time trial B	31 August
Bronze	Mary Fisher	Swimming	Women's 50m freestyle S11	1 September
Bronze	Michael Johnson	Shooting	Mixed 10m air rifle standing SH2	2 September

Medals by sport
Sport	Gold medal	Silver medal	Bronze medal	Total
Swimming	5	6	1	12
Cycling	1	1	2	4
Shooting	0	0	1	1
Total	6	7	4	17

== Events ==
=== Athletics ===
Men—Track

Athlete	Events	Heat		Final	
Athlete	Events	Time	Rank	Time	Rank
Tim Prendergast	800m T13	1:58.21	3 Q	1:55.85	5
Tim Prendergast	1500m T13	3:57.39	6 q	3:53.60	6

Men—Field

Athlete	Events	Result	Rank
Peter Martin	Shot Put F52-53	8.62 (726 pts)	5
Peter Martin	Javelin F52-53	15.26 (747 pts)	6

Women—Field

Athlete	Events	Result	Rank
Holly Robinson	Javelin F46	32.58	7

=== Cycling ===
==== Road ====
Athlete	Event	Classification	Time	Rank
Phillipa Gray; Laura Thompson (pilot)	Women's road race	B	2:12:56	7
Phillipa Gray; Laura Thompson (pilot)	Women's time trial	B	35:07.68	2nd place, silver medalist(s)
Susan Reid	Women's road race	H1-3	2:00:39	8
Susan Reid	Women's time trial	H3	36:00.46	4
Chris Ross	Men's road race	C4-5	2:01:32	18
Chris Ross	Men's time trial	C5	36:17.18	12
Nathan Smith	Men's road race	C1-3	did not finish	
Nathan Smith	Men's time trial	C-3	24:59.69	10
Fiona Southorn	Women's road race	C4-5	1:57:05	10
Fiona Southorn	Women's time trial	C-5	26:00.81	5

==== Track ====
Athlete	Event	Classification	Heats		Final	
Athlete	Event	Classification	Time	Rank	Time	Rank
Phillipa Gray; Laura Thompson (pilot)	Women's kilo	B	—N/a		1:11.245	3rd place, bronze medalist(s)
Phillipa Gray; Laura Thompson (pilot)	Women's pursuit	B	3:31.530 WR	1 Q	3:32.243	1st place, gold medalist(s)
Chris Ross	Men's kilo	C4-5	—N/a		1:11.569	14
Chris Ross	Men's pursuit	C5	5:04.669	12	did not advance	
Nathan Smith	Men's kilo	C1-3	—N/a		1:16.159	23
Nathan Smith	Men's pursuit	C3	3:48.555	8	did not advance	
Fiona Southorn	Women's 500	C4-5	—N/a		41.796	7
Fiona Southorn	Women's pursuit	C5	3:52.695	3 Q	3:55.867	3rd place, bronze medalist(s)

Team Sprint

Athletes	Event	Classification	Qualification		Final	
Athletes	Event	Classification	Time	Rank	Time	Rank
Chris Ross; Nathan Smith; Fiona Southorn	Mixed team sprint	C1-5	57.449	10	did not advance	

=== Equestrian ===
Athlete	Horse	Event	Classification	Final	
Athlete	Horse	Event	Classification	Result	Rank
Anthea Gunner	Huntington Incognito	Individual championship test	II	63.762	19
Anthea Gunner	Huntington Incognito	Individual freestyle test	II	62.750	17
Rachel Stock	Rimini Park Emmerich	Individual championship test	III	65.733	9
Rachel Stock	Rimini Park Emmerich	Individual freestyle test	III	66.850	9

=== Rowing ===
Athlete	Event	Classification	Heats		Repechage		Final B	
Athlete	Event	Classification	Time	Rank	Time	Rank	Time	Rank
Danny McBride	Men's single sculls	AS	5:00.04	4	5:04.47	3 Final B	5:06.90	1

=== Sailing ===
Athlete	Event	Race											Points		Rank
Athlete	Event	1	2	3	4	5	6	7	8	9	10	11	Tot	Net	Rank
Jan Apel; Tim Dempsey	Two Person Keelboat (SKUD 18)	9	9	5	7	8	(11)	10	10	9	10	RC	88	77	10
Paul Francis	One Person Keelboat (2.4mR)	14	10	14	12	(16)	3	11	12	14	9	RC	115	99	13

=== Shooting ===
Michael Johnson was New Zealand's flag bearer for the opening ceremonies.

Athlete	Event	Qualification		Final	
Athlete	Event	Score	Rank	Score	Rank
Michael Johnson	Mixed R4–10 m air rifle standing SH2	600	1 Q	704.7	3rd place, bronze medalist(s)
Michael Johnson	Mixed R5–10 m air rifle prone SH2	600	5 Q	705.7	4

=== Swimming ===
Note: Qualifiers for the finals (Q) of all events were decided on a time only basis, therefore ranks shown are overall ranks versus competitors in all heats. Also, ranks shown for those who did not advance are their final ranks.

Men

Athlete	Event	Heat		Final	
Athlete	Event	Time	Rank	Time	Rank
Daniel Holt	50 m freestyle S13	25.89	13	did not advance	
Daniel Holt	100 m freestyle S13	55.23	10	did not advance	
Daniel Holt	400 m freestyle S13	4:17.63	3 Q	4:12.66	4
Daniel Holt	100 m butterfly S13	1:02.77	10	did not advance	
Cameron Leslie	200 m freestyle S5	2:56.74	5 Q	2:54.27	6
Cameron Leslie	50 m backstroke S5	42.88	7 Q	42.40	5
Cameron Leslie	150 m individual medley SM4	2:32.96 PR	1 Q	2:25.98 WR	1st place, gold medalist(s)
Daniel Sharp	50 m freestyle S13	25.16	10	did not advance	
Daniel Sharp	100 m freestyle S13	55.88	12	did not advance	
Daniel Sharp	100 m breaststroke SB13	1:08.43	3 Q	1:06.72	2nd place, silver medalist(s)

Women

Athlete	Event	Heat		Final	
Athlete	Event	Time	Rank	Time	Rank
Rebecca Dubber	50 m freestyle S7	37.20	11	did not advance	
Rebecca Dubber	100 m freestyle S7	1:18.30	9	did not advance	
Rebecca Dubber	400 m freestyle S7	5:27.79	5 Q	5:30.05	5
Rebecca Dubber	100 m backstroke S7	1:26.26	4 Q	1:25.80	5
Mary Fisher	50 m freestyle S11	32.19	3 Q	31.67	3rd place, bronze medalist(s)
Mary Fisher	100 m freestyle S11	1:12.01	5 Q	1:09.83	2nd place, silver medalist(s)
Mary Fisher	400 m freestyle S11	5:32.31	4 Q	5:22.09	4
Mary Fisher	100 m backstroke S11	1:20.89 PR	1 Q	1:19.62	2nd place, silver medalist(s)
Mary Fisher	200 m individual medley SM11	2:51.90	2 Q	2:46.91 WR	1st place, gold medalist(s)
Nikita Howarth	50 m butterfly S7	40.94	11	did not advance	
Nikita Howarth	100 m breaststroke SB8	1:33.48	9	did not advance	
Nikita Howarth	200 m individual medley SM7	3:13.77	5 Q	3:10.48	6
Aine Kelly-Costello	50 m freestyle S11	36.85	17	did not advance	
Aine Kelly-Costello	100 m freestyle S11	1:23.10	15	did not advance	
Aine Kelly-Costello	400 m freestyle S11	6:27.02	10	did not advance	
Aine Kelly-Costello	100 m backstroke S11	1:26.57	6 Q	1:24.70	6
Sophie Pascoe	50 m freestyle S10	28.41	2 Q	28.24	2nd place, silver medalist(s)
Sophie Pascoe	100 m freestyle S10	1:01.17 PR	1 Q	1:00.89 PR	1st place, gold medalist(s)
Sophie Pascoe	100 m backstroke S10	1:07.77 PR	1 Q	1:06.69	2nd place, silver medalist(s)
Sophie Pascoe	100 m breaststroke SB9	1:19.28	2 Q	1:18.38	2nd place, silver medalist(s)
Sophie Pascoe	100 m butterfly S10	1:04.97 WR	1 Q	1:04.43 WR	1st place, gold medalist(s)
Sophie Pascoe	200 m individual medley SM10	2:28.73 WR	1 Q	2:25.65 WR	1st place, gold medalist(s)

Key

- Note–Ranks given for preliminary rounds are within the athlete's heat only, with the exception of swimming (see section)
- Q = Qualified for the next round
- q = Qualified for the next round as a fastest loser or by position without achieving the qualifying target
- PR = Paralympic record
- WR = World record
- N/A = Round not applicable for the event
- Bye = Athlete not required to compete in round

== See also ==
- New Zealand at the Paralympics
- New Zealand at the 2012 Summer Olympics
