= Swimming at the 2012 Summer Paralympics – Women's 100 metre backstroke S11 =

Women's 100m Backstroke S11 at the XIV Paralympic Games
- Venue: London Aquatics Centre
- Dates: 2 September
- Competitors: 11 from 9 nations
- Winning time: 1:19.50

Medalists
1st place, gold medalist(s)		Rina Akiyama	Japan
2nd place, silver medalist(s)		Mary Fisher	New Zealand
3rd place, bronze medalist(s)		Cecilia Camellini	Italy

The women's 100m backstroke S11 event at the 2012 Summer Paralympics took place at the London Aquatics Centre on 2 September. There were two heats; the swimmers with the eight fastest times advanced to the final.

== Results ==
=== Heats ===
Competed from 10:31.

==== Heat 1 ====
Rank	Lane	Name	Nationality	Time	Notes
1	4	Cecilia Camellini	Italy	1:25.63	Q
2	3	Olga Sokolova	Russia	1:25.76	Q
3	5	Aine Kelly-Costello	New Zealand	1:26.57	Q
4	6	Amber Thomas	Canada	1:27.71	
5	2	Stephanie Douard	France	1:28.98	

==== Heat 2 ====
Rank	Lane	Name	Nationality	Time	Notes
1	3	Mary Fisher	New Zealand	1:20.89	Q, PR
2	5	Daniela Schulte	Germany	1:20.92	Q
3	4	Rina Akiyama	Japan	1:22.47	Q
4	2	Maryna Piddubna	Ukraine	1:26.87	Q
5	6	Chikako Ono	Japan	1:27.10	Q
6	7	Letticia Martinez	United States	1:27.85	

=== Final ===
Competed at 18:12.

Rank	Lane	Name	Nationality	Time	Notes
1st place, gold medalist(s)	3	Rina Akiyama	Japan	1:19.50	PR
2nd place, silver medalist(s)	4	Mary Fisher	New Zealand	1:19.62	OC
3rd place, bronze medalist(s)	6	Cecilia Camellini	Italy	1:19.91	
4	5	Daniela Schulte	Germany	1:20.09	
5	1	Maryna Piddubna	Ukraine	1:24.32	
6	7	Aine Kelly-Costello	New Zealand	1:24.70	
7	2	Olga Sokolova	Russia	1:25.13	
8	8	Chikako Ono	Japan	1:27.55	

'Q = qualified for final. PR = Paralympic Record. OC = Oceania Record.
