= Proximal femoral focal deficiency =

- Other names: Congenital Femoral Deficiency
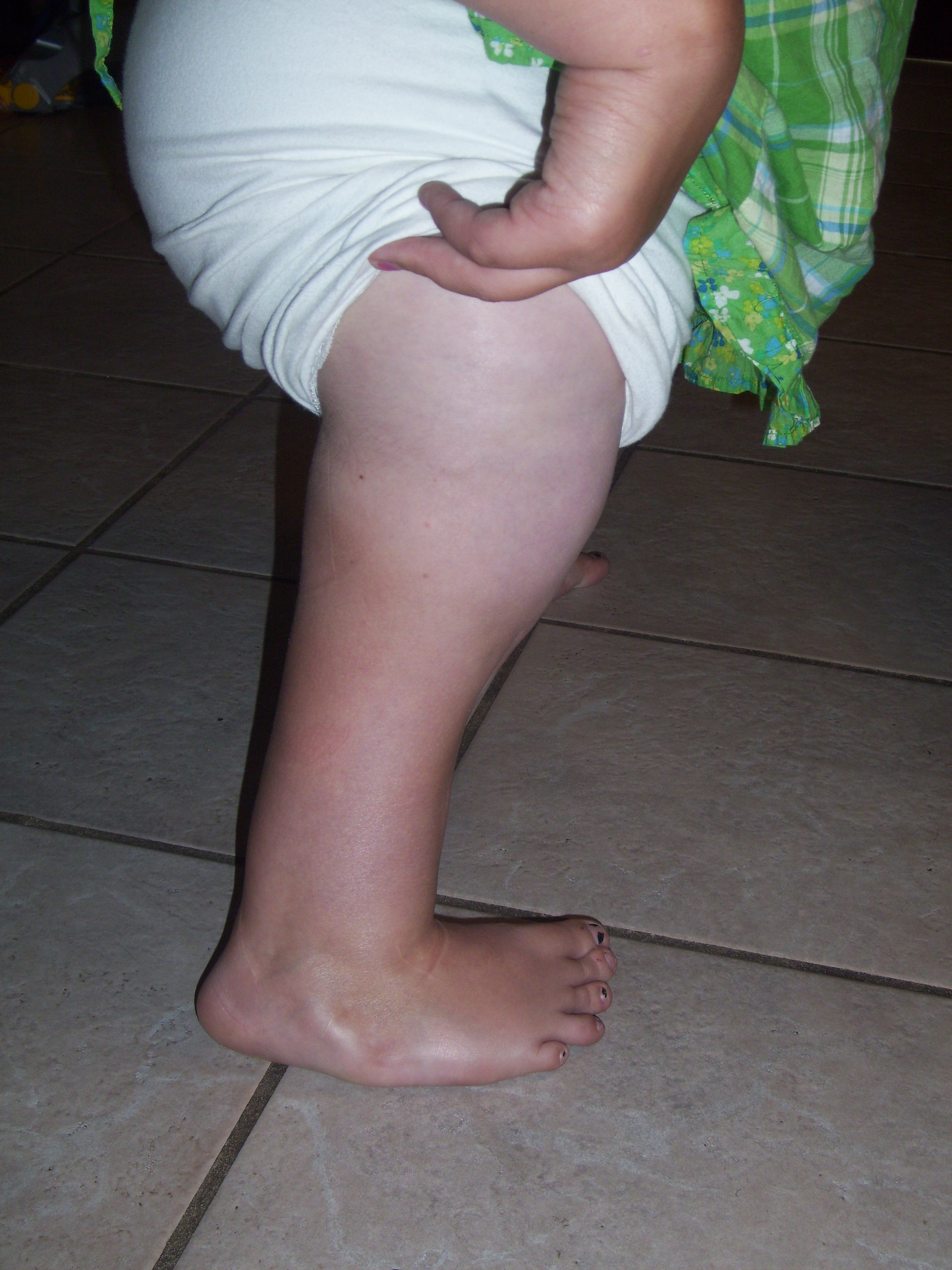
- 13-year-old girl with PFFD
- Specialty: Medical genetics

Proximal femoral focal deficiency (PFFD), also known as congenital femoral deficiency (CFD), is a rare, non-hereditary birth defect that affects the pelvis, particularly the hip bone, and the proximal femur. The disorder may affect one side or both, with the hip being deformed and the leg shortened.

It is commonly linked with the absence or shortening of a leg bone (fibular hemimelia) and the absence of a kneecap. Other linked birth defects include the dislocation or instability of the joint between the femur and the kneecap, a shortened tibia or fibula, and foot deformities.

== Causes ==
The cause of PFFD is uncertain. Two hypotheses have been advanced. The theory of sclerotome subtraction posits injury to neural crest cells that are the precursors to sensory nerves at the level of L4 and L5. Histologic studies of a fetus with unilateral PFFD have prompted an alternative hypothesis that PFFD is caused by a defect in maturation of chondrocytes (cartilage cells) at the growth plate. In either hypothesis, the agent causing the injury is usually not known. Thalidomide is known to cause PFFD when the mother is exposed to it in the fifth or sixth week of pregnancy, and it is speculated that exposure to other toxins during pregnancy may also be a cause. Other etiologies that have been suggested, but not proven, include anoxia, ischemia, radiation, infection, hormones, and mechanical force. PFFD occurs sporadically, and does not appear to be hereditary.

== Diagnosis ==
=== Classifications ===
There are typically four classes (or types) of PFFD, ranging from class A to class D, as detailed by Aitken.

Type A — The femur bone is slightly shorter on the proximal end (near the hip), and the femoral head (the ball of the thigh bone that goes into the hip socket) may not be solid enough to be seen on X-rays at birth, but later hardens (ossifies). This deformity is sometimes called congenital short femur, because the child's anatomy from hip to knee is contiguous and similar to their peers except for the one shortened bone. In some cases, children with type A deformities will also have an externally rotated femur, which could lead to bowing of the legs (genu varum).

Type B — The femur bone is shorter on the proximal end (near the hip) and the defect affects both the femoral head (the ball) and the femoral shaft (the long part of the bone). This defect is more severe than type A deformities because it will not heal spontaneously and, at skeletal maturity, the proximal femur (lower part near the knee) will not connect with the femoral head.

Type C — The entire top half of the femur bone is absent, including the trochanters (the part of the bone in which muscles are attached to the upper thigh), and the femoral head. In type C deformities, the proximal femur is not connected to the hip in any way. In fact, many children with type C deformities also have acetabular dysplasia, a condition in which the acetabulum (hip socket) is shallow, abnormally shaped, and oriented outward.

Type D — This is the most severe form of proximal femoral focal deficiency, in which most of the femur bone is absent and only a small irregular piece of bone above the distal femoral epiphysis (the end of the femur bone at the knee) is present. In the pelvis, no acetabulum (hip socket) is present; instead the pelvic wall is flat on the affected side.

== Treatment ==
Depending on the severity of the deformities, the treatment may include the amputation of the foot or part of the leg, lengthening of the femur, extension prosthesis, or custom shoe lifts. Amputation usually requires the use of prosthesis. Another alternative is a rotationplasty procedure, also known as Van Ness surgery. In this situation the foot and ankle are surgically removed, then attached to the femur. This creates a functional "knee joint". This allows the patient to be fit with a below knee prosthesis vs a traditional above knee prosthesis.

In less severe cases, the use of an Ilizarov apparatus can be successful in conjunction with hip and knee surgeries (depending on the status of the femoral head/kneecap) to extend the femur length to normal ranges. This method of treatment can be problematic in that the Ilizarov might need to be applied both during early childhood (to keep the femur from being extremely short at the onset of growth) and after puberty (to match leg lengths after growth has ended). The clear benefit of this approach, however, is that no prosthetics are needed and at the conclusion of surgical procedures the patient will not be biologically or anatomically different from a person born without PFFD.

In some cases the patient may not request treatment and instead elect to use a wheelchair or other aids to assist mobility.
