= Helen Scott (cyclist) =

English cyclist

Helen Scott MBE
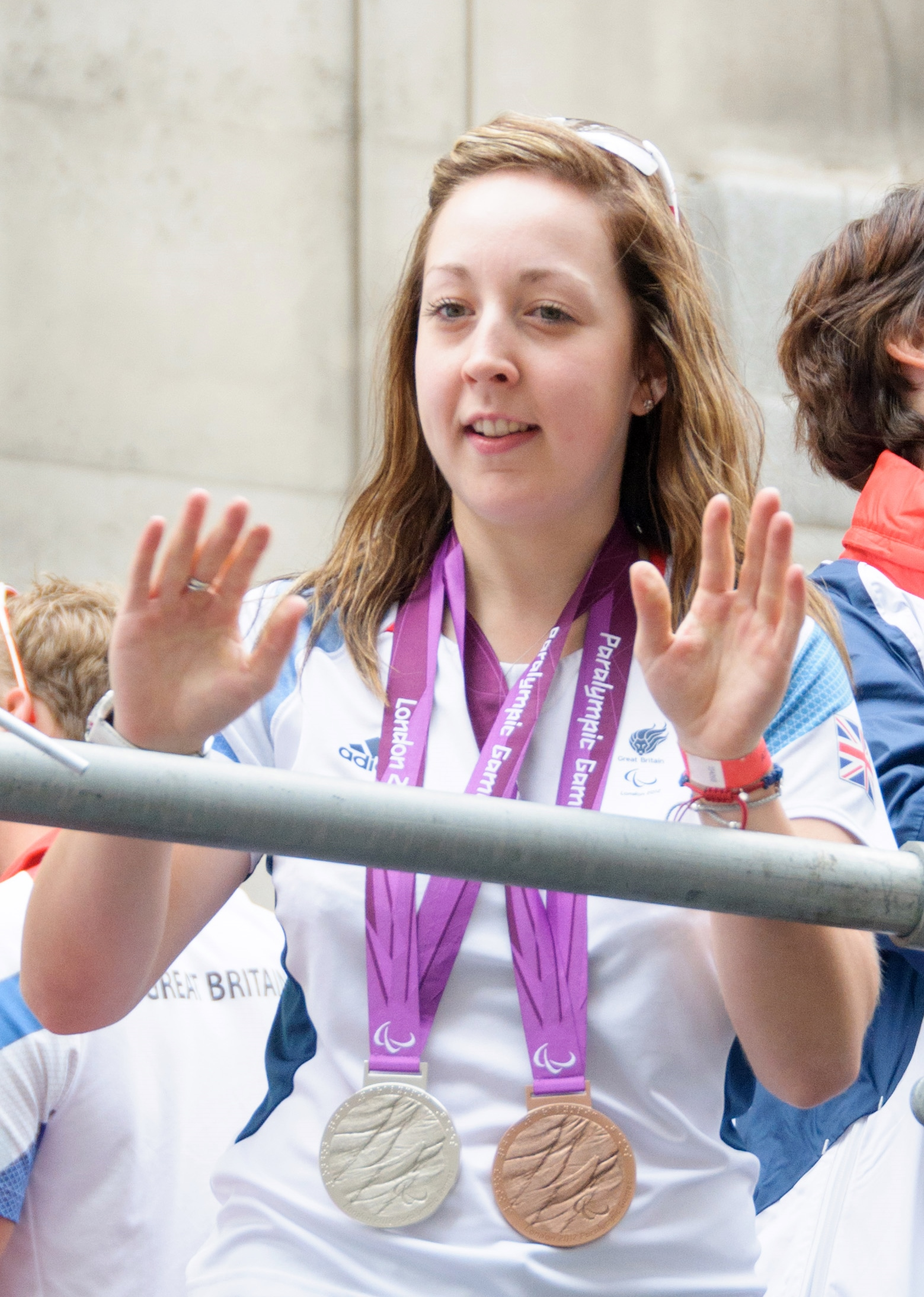
- Scott wearing her medals after the 2012 Paralympics

Personal information
- Full name: Helen Sarah Scott
- Nickname: Scottie
- Born: 25 July 1990 (age 36) Birmingham, England, United Kingdom

Cycling career
- Sport: Cycling
- Current team: Boot Out Breast Cancer
- Discipline: Tandem
- Role: Pilot
- Rider type: Sprint

Professional team
- 2010–: Great Britain Paracycling Team
Medal record
Women's track cycling
Representing Great Britain
Paralympic Games
Gold medal – first place	2016 Rio de Janeiro	Tandem B kilo
Silver medal – second place	2012 London	Tandem B kilo
Silver medal – second place	2020 Tokyo	Tandem B kilo
Bronze medal – third place	2012 London	Tandem B pursuit
Bronze medal – third place	2016 Rio de Janeiro	Tandem B pursuit
UCI Para-cycling Track World Championships
Gold medal – first place	2015 Apeldoorn	Tandem B kilo
Gold medal – first place	2015 Apeldoorn	Tandem B sprint
Gold medal – first place	2018 Rio de Janeiro	Tandem B kilo
Gold medal – first place	2018 Rio de Janeiro	Tandem B sprint
Silver medal – second place	2011 Montichiari	Tandem B kilo
Silver medal – second place	2012 Los Angeles	Tandem B kilo
Silver medal – second place	2012 Los Angeles	Tandem B pursuit
Silver medal – second place	2012 Los Angeles	Tandem B sprint
Silver medal – second place	2016 Montichiari	Tandem B kilo
Silver medal – second place	2016 Montichiari	Tandem B sprint
Silver medal – second place	2017 Los Angeles	Tandem B sprint
Bronze medal – third place	2017 Los Angeles	Tandem B kilo
Representing England
Commonwealth Games
Gold medal – first place	2014 Glasgow	Tandem B sprint
Gold medal – first place	2014 Glasgow	Tandem B kilo
Gold medal – first place	2018 Gold Coast	Tandem B sprint
Gold medal – first place	2018 Gold Coast	Tandem B kilo

Helen Sarah Scott (born 25 July 1990) is an English sprint cyclist. As well as competing as part of the Great Britain team Scott is also an able-bodied tandem cyclist, who since 2011 has acted as pilot for Paralympian Aileen McGlynn, Sophie Thornhill and Alison Patrick.

== Biography ==
Scott was born in Birmingham, England in 1990. A keen sportsperson from a young age, her interest in cycling was sparked when her parents moved to Halesowen when she was 10, with Scott joining the local cycling club. Scott was accepted into University of Birmingham to study a degree in Sport, PE and Coaching Science in 2008. She only spent two weeks in Birmingham, leaving after being informed that she had been offered a place at British Cycling's Sprint Academy.

As a member of the Sprint Academy, Scott represented the British team at national level. In 2009, she was part of the winning women's Team Sprint at the National Track Championships. In 2010 Scott joined the GB Para-Cycling Team, and was given the role of pilot to three-time Paralympic gold medalist Aileen McGlynn. In 2011 the two competed in the B1km Time Trial at the Para-Cycling Track World Championships in Montichiari, Italy taking silver. They followed this in 2012 by entering the UCI Para-Cycling Track World Championships held in Los Angeles in the United States. They took three silver medals at the Championships, in B3km Pursuit silver, B1km Time Trial and B Sprint.

Scott took part in her first Summer Paralympic Games in 2012, again partnered with McGlynn. The pair entered both the Women's 1 km time trial B and the Women's individual pursuit B. In the time trial, Scott and McGlynn, took to the velodrome as the penultimate racers and posted the fastest time with 1.09.469; only for the current World Champions, Australia's Felicity Johnson and Stephanie Morton to record a Paralympic record of 1:08.919 in the last trial, leaving Scott and McGlynn with the silver medal. In the individual pursuit Scott and McGlynn finished third in the preliminaries, setting them up for a bronze medal decider with British team-mates Lora Turnham and her pilot Fiona Duncan. Scott and McGlynn finished a second quicker, taking the bronze medal, their second medal of the games.

Scott teamed up with Sophie Thornhill for the 2014 Commonwealth Games. The pair won gold in the visually impaired tandem sprint when they defeated McGlynn and Louise Haston of Scotland 2–0 in the final and followed it up with a second gold in the kilo time trial.

At the 2016 Rio Paralympics Scott and Thornhill won gold in the 1km time trial B and bronze in the individual pursuit B.

She was appointed Member of the Order of the British Empire (MBE) in the 2017 New Year Honours for services to cycling.

Scott reunited with McGlynn for the 2020 Tokyo Paralympics, where the pair won the silver medal in the 1km time trial B.
