= Koby Lion =

Israeli paracyclist

Yaakov "Koby" Lion (Hebrew: יעקב "קובי" ליאון) is an Israeli paracyclist.

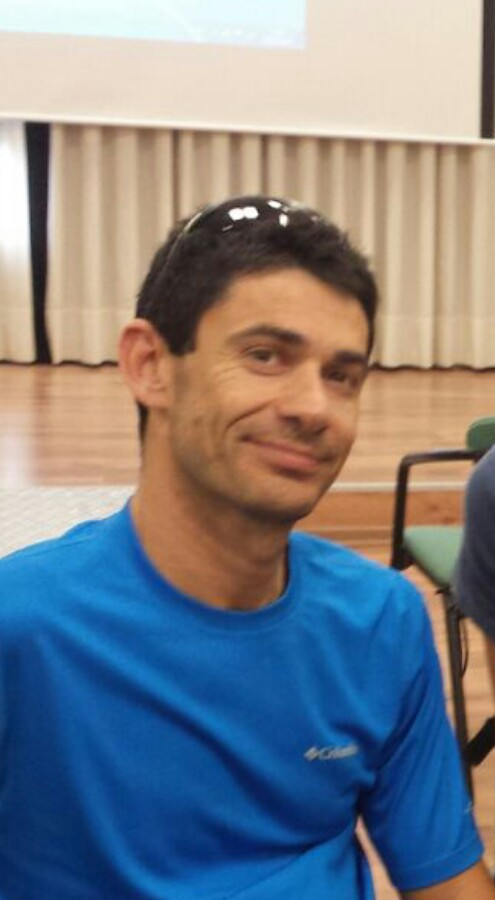
Image of Koby Lion

== Career ==
After becoming permanently injured in Lebanon while serving in the Israel Defence Forces, Lion focused on his hand cycling abilities. He competed for Team Israel at the 2010 European Handcycling Federation road race, where he won a bronze medal. The following year, Lion placed second at the UCI Paracycling Road World Championships.

At the 2012 Summer Paralympics, Lion completed the men's individual H1 time trial in 18:45.21 minutes, and his second race in 17:41.65 minutes, finishing with a silver medal. Later, he won a silver medal at the 2015 UCI Para-Cycling Road World Cup with a time of 26:31.65. In 2016, Lion competed at the 2016 Summer Paralympics in Rio de Janeiro, but finished in sixth place with a time of 36:50.45 minutes.
