= Marie-Claude Molnar =

Canadian para-cyclist

Personal information
- Born: 2 October 1983 (age 42) Greenfield Park, Quebec, Canada

Sport
- Sport: Paralympic cycling
- Retired: 2022
Medal record
Representing Canada
Paralympic Games
Bronze medal – third place	2012 London	Time trial C4
Parapan American Games
Silver medal – second place	2011 Guadalajara	Road race C1-3
Silver medal – second place	2019 Lima	Individual pursuit C4-5
World Track Championships
Gold medal – first place	2017 Los Angeles	Scratch C1-3
Silver medal – second place	2017 Los Angeles	Time trial C4
Silver medal – second place	2017 Los Angeles	Individual pursuit C4-5
World Road Championships
Gold medal – first place	2021 Cascais	Time trial C4
Gold medal – first place	2021 Cascais	Road race C4
Silver medal – second place	2013 Baie-Comeau	Road race C1-3

Marie-Claude Molnar, PLY (born October 2, 1983) is a C4 Canadian retired road and track cyclist. She won Canada's first medal in cycling at the 2012 London Paralympic Games.

== Accident ==
In July 2005, Molnar was involved in a serious road accident. She was hit by a car on the outskirts of Saint-Bernard-De-Lacolle, the car was driving at an excessive speed, Molnar hit the car's windshield which resulted in life-changing injuries: she had a fractured skull, serious brain injury, twenty fractures in one of her legs and serious injuries to her arms. A motorist, an off-duty paramedic helped her at the scene to stop bleeding. Molnar spent three weeks in hospital to recover fully from her injuries, she returned to cycling in September of that year.
