= Allison Jones (athlete) =

American paralympic cyclist and alpine skier

- Allison Jones (2026)

Personal information
- Born: May 12, 1984 (age 42) Amarillo, Texas, U.S.

Sport
- Country: United States
- Sport: Paralympic cycling Paralympic alpine skiing
- Disability: Proximal femoral focal deficiency
Medal record
Paralympic cycling
Representing United States
Paralympic Games
Gold medal – first place	2012 London	Time trial C1-3
Silver medal – second place	2008 Beijing	Time trial LC3-4/CP3
Bronze medal – third place	2012 London	Road race C1-3
Bronze medal – third place	2012 London	Individual pursuit C1-3
Road World Championships
Gold medal – first place	2017 Pietermaritzburg	Road race C2
Silver medal – second place	2015 Nottwil	Time trial C2
Bronze medal – third place	2015 Nottwil	Road race C2
Bronze medal – third place	2017 Pietermaritzburg	Time trial C2
Bronze medal – third place	2025 Ronse	Time trial C2
Track World Championships
Gold medal – first place	2011 Montichiari	Individual pursuit C2
Bronze medal – third place	2011 Montichiari	500m time trial C2
Bronze medal – third place	2026 Apeldoorn	Scratch race C2
Bronze medal – third place	2026 Apeldoorn	Elimination C2
Parapan American Games
Gold medal – first place	2011 Guadalajara	Individual pursuit C1-3
Bronze medal – third place	2011 Guadalajara	Road race C1-3
Bronze medal – third place	2011 Guadalajara	500m time trial C1-5
Bronze medal – third place	2015 Toronto	500m time trial C1-5
Paralympic alpine skiing
Paralympic Games
Gold medal – first place	2006 Turin	Slalom standing
Silver medal – second place	2002 Salt Lake City	Super-G LW2
Silver medal – second place	2002 Salt Lake City	Giant slalom LW2
Bronze medal – third place	2014 Sochi	Downhill standing
World Para Alpine Skiing Championships
Silver medal – second place	2009 Pyeongchang	Super combined standing
Silver medal – second place	2009 Pyeongchang	Slalom standing

Allison Jones (born May 12, 1984 in Amarillo, Texas) is an American Paralympic skier and cyclist.

== Early life ==
She was born with the birth defect proximal femoral focal deficiency (PFFD), which left her without a right femur. She underwent surgery at age seven months to amputate her right foot, allowing her to more easily wear a prosthetic leg. She received her first prosthetic leg at nine months of age. Allison moved from Amarillo, TX to Colorado Springs, CO at age two and a half.

== Education ==
She has a mechanical engineering degree from University of Denver where she received the "Pioneer Award".

== Career ==
At the 2006 Winter Paralympics she won a gold medal for slalom in the standing category. Before that she had won silver medals in the super-G and the giant slalom in the 2002 Winter Paralympics. She lives in Colorado Springs, Colorado. Most of her Paralympic medals have been at skiing, but she also won a silver medal at the 2008 Summer Paralympics in cycling.
