= Laura Thompson (cyclist) =

New Zealand Paralympic cyclist

Laura Thompson ONZM
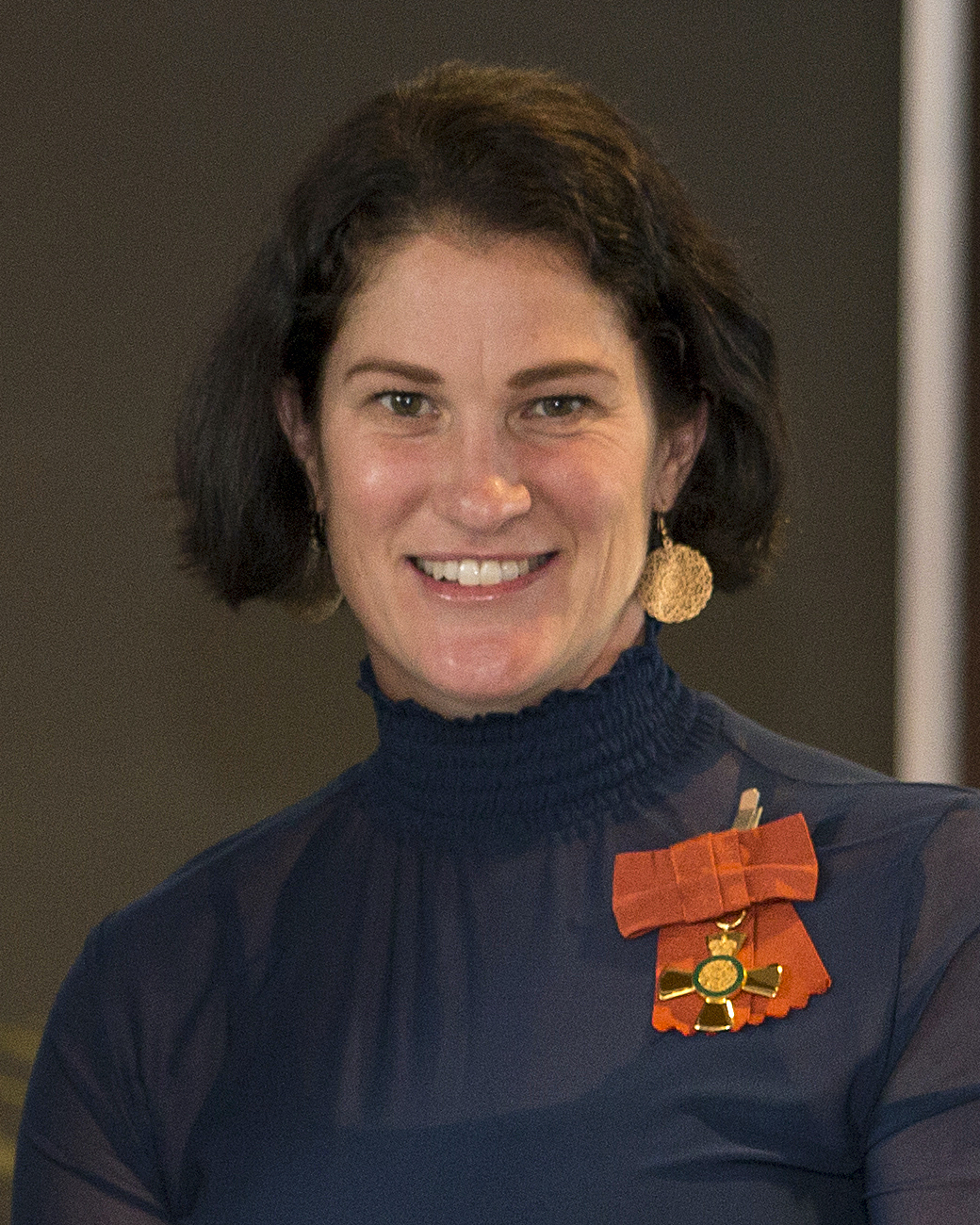
- Thompson in 2022

Personal information
- Born: Laura Gail Thompson; 4 June 1987 (age 39)

Sport
- Sport: Cycling
Medal record
Women's para cycling
Representing New Zealand
Paralympic Games
| Gold medal – first place | 2012 London | Individual pursuit B |
| Silver medal – second place | 2012 London | Road time trial B |
| Silver medal – second place | 2016 Rio de Janeiro | Individual pursuit B |
| Bronze medal – third place | 2012 London | 1 km time trial B |
| Bronze medal – third place | 2016 Rio de Janeiro | Road race B |
Track World Championships
| Gold medal – first place | 2014 Aguascalientes | Indiv Pursuit B |
| Gold medal – first place | 2015 Apeldoorn | Indiv Pursuit B |
| Gold medal – first place | 2016 Montichiari | Indiv Pursuit Tandem |
| Bronze medal – third place | 2014 Aguascalientes | Sprint B |
| Bronze medal – third place | 2015 Apeldoorn | 1 km Time Trial B |
Road World Championships
| Silver medal – second place | 2014 Greenville | Indiv Time Trial B |
| Silver medal – second place | 2015 Nottwil | Indiv Road Race B |
| Silver medal – second place | 2015 Nottwil | Indiv Time Trial B |

Laura Gail Thompson ONZM (for a time with a married name Fairweather; born 4 June 1987) is a New Zealand cyclist and former basketballer. She represented New Zealand at the 2012 Summer Paralympics as the tandem sighted pilot for Phillipa Gray, winning three medals: one gold, one silver and one bronze. At the 2016 Summer Paralympics, she was the sighted pilot for Emma Foy, winning one silver and one bronze medal.

From 2014 to 2016 she won a total of eight medals (including three gold) at the UCI Para-cycling Track and Road Championships, with partner Emma Foy.

Thompson played basketball in her youth, representing New Zealand at junior level before being selected for the national team at age 18. However, she developed hip problems requiring surgery to correct and forcing her to retire from basketball. Thompson picked up cycling through rehabilitation, later becoming a member of the national development team before switching to para-cycling piloting in 2009.

In the 2013 New Year Honours, Fairweather was appointed a Member of the New Zealand Order of Merit for services to cycling. In the 2022 New Year Honours, Thompson was promoted to Officer of the New Zealand Order of Merit for services to Paralympic cycling.
