= Aileen McGlynn =

Scottish paralympic tandem cyclist

Aileen McGlynn OBE
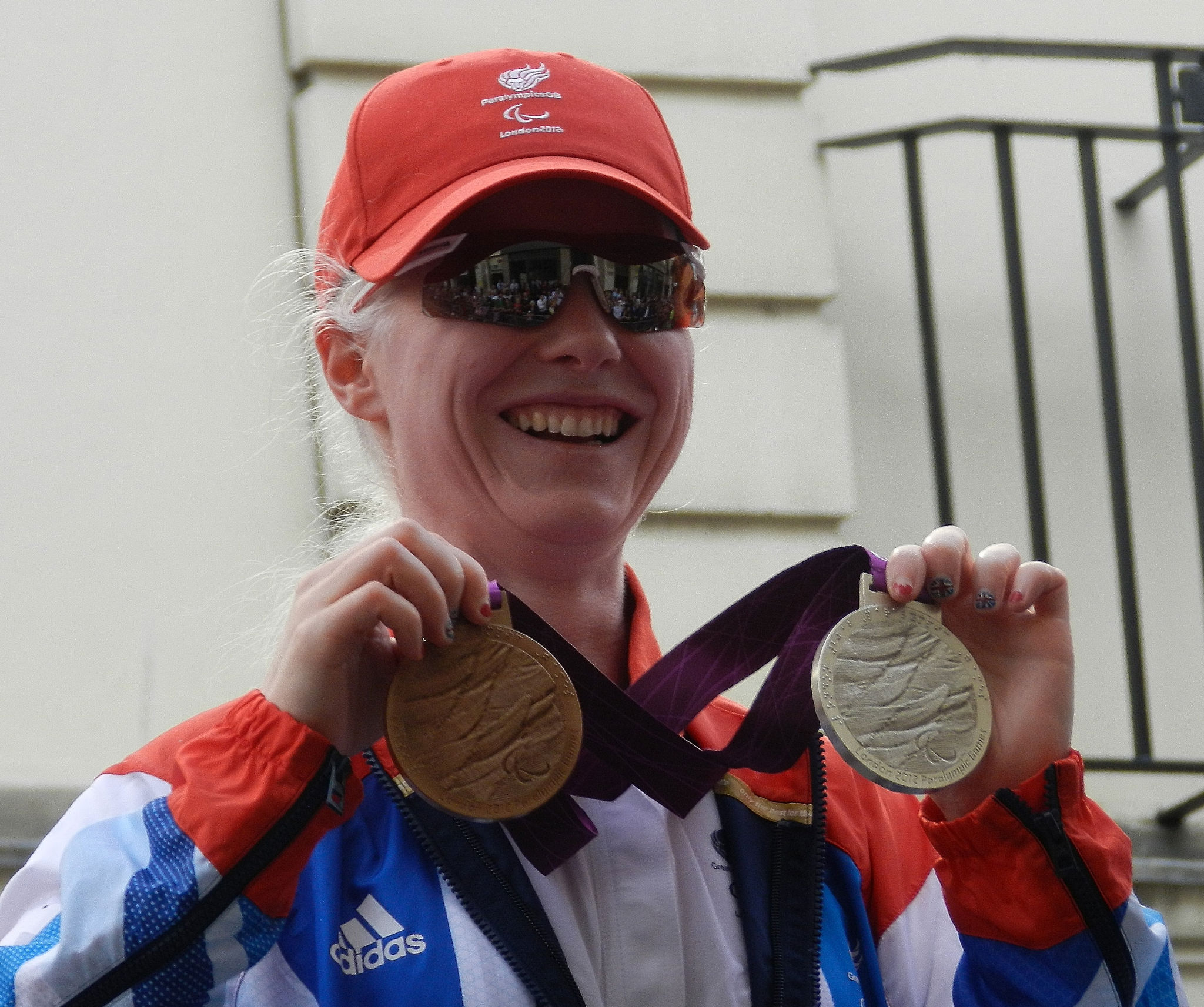
- McGlynn at the Olympic Victory Parade

Personal information
- Full name: Aileen McGlynn
- Born: 22 June 1973 (age 53) Paisley, Scotland, United Kingdom

Cycling career
- Sport: Cycling
- Discipline: Tandem
- Role: Stoker
- Rider type: Sprint

Amateur teams
- 1991–?: Glenmarnock Wheelers
- ?: Johnstone Wheelers
- ?–2004: Royal Albert Cycling Club
- 2014 -: Team Glow

Professional teams
- 2013: Team Scotland
- 2004–2013: Great Britain Paracycling Team
Medal record
Event	1st	2nd	3rd
Paralympic Games	3	3	1
World Track Championships	4	5	2
World Road Championships	0	1	0
European Track Championships	1	0	0
Commonwealth Games	0	3	1
Total	8	11	4
Representing Scotland
Women's track cycling
Commonwealth Games
Silver medal – second place	2014 Glasgow	Sprint (B&VI)
Silver medal – second place	2014 Glasgow	Kilo (B&VI)
Silver medal – second place	2022 Birmingham	Sprint (B&VI)
Bronze medal – third place	2022 Birmingham	Kilo (B&VI)
Representing Great Britain
Women's track cycling
Paralympic Games
Gold medal – first place	2004 Athens	Kilo (B&VI)
Gold medal – first place	2008 Beijing	Kilo (B&VI)
Gold medal – first place	2008 Beijing	Individual Pursuit
Silver medal – second place	2004 Athens	Individual Sprint
Silver medal – second place	2012 London	Kilo (B&Vi)
Silver medal – second place	2020 Tokyo	Kilo (B)
Bronze medal – third place	2012 London	Individual Pursuit
UCI Para-Cycling World Track Championships
Gold medal – first place	2006 Switzerland	Kilo
Gold medal – first place	2007 France	Kilo
Gold medal – first place	2007 France	Pursuit
Gold medal – first place	2009 England	Kilo
Silver medal – second place	2011 Italy	Kilo
Silver medal – second place	2012 Los Angeles (USA)	Kilo
Silver medal – second place	2012 Los Angeles (USA)	Pursuit
Silver medal – second place	2012 Los Angeles (USA)	Sprint
Silver medal – second place	2017 Los Angeles (USA)	Kilo
Bronze medal – third place	2009 England	Pursuit
Bronze medal – third place	2017 Los Angeles (USA)	Sprint
UCI Para-Cycling European Track Championships
Gold medal – first place	2005 Netherlands	Kilo
Women's road cycling
UCI Para-Cycling Road World Championships
Silver medal – second place	2009 Italy	Time Trial

Aileen McGlynn OBE (born 22 June 1973) is a Scottish paralympic tandem champion cyclist, tandem piloted until 2009 by Ellen Hunter but most regularly piloted by Helen Scott.

== Biography ==
Born in Paisley and grew up in Glasgow, McGlynn was partially sighted at birth, she joined the Glenmarnock Wheelers cycling club at the age of 18 but was initially reluctant to tell her club mates about her disability. However, when the club worked it out they were very supportive. She is also a patron of an organisation called 'Crank It Up' who aim to provide cycling for people of all abilities.

Before McGlynn became a full-time athlete, she was a trainee actuary with a degree in mathematics, statistics and management science from the University of Strathclyde.

McGlynn and Hunter broke the flying 200m women's tandem World record in April 2004.

At the 2004 Athens Paralympics, McGlynn and Hunter won gold in the women's time trial B-13 and silver in the Individual sprint.

At the 2006 IPC Track Cycling World Championships in Aigle, Switzerland, the pair won gold in the Tamdem Kilo (VI), setting a world record of 1:10.795 in the process and winning a Rainbow Jersey, they ranked 17th among 33 male competitors.

McGlynn and Hunter, coached by Barney Storey, once again broke the World Record at the UCI Track Cycling World Championships in Manchester, in a time of 1:10.381, but despite this, failed to gain a podium position.

The pair represented Great Britain at the 2008 Beijing Paralympics, winning gold in the Kilo (B&VI 1–3), setting a new world record time of 1:09.066 in the process, and in the individual pursuit (B&VI 1–3).

Having been appointed a Member of the Order of the British Empire (MBE) in the 2006 New Year Honours, McGlynn was promoted to Officer of the Order of the British Empire (OBE) in the 2009 New Year Honours. She was also named Alumna of the Year by the University of Strathclyde in 2009. She was voted runner-up in the Evening Times Sportswoman Woman of the Year in 2008.

In 2010 McGlynn teamed up with pilot Helen Scott; in 2011 the two competed in the B1km Time Trial at the Para-Cycling Track World Championships in Montichiari, Italy taking silver. They followed this in 2012 by entering the UCI Para-Cycling Track World Championships held in Los Angeles in the United States. They took three silver medals at the Championships, in B3km Pursuit silver, B1km Time Trial and B Sprint.

At the 2012 London Paralympics, McGlynn and Scott won silver in the 1km time trial B and bronze in the individual pursuit B.

McGlynn took her first silver medal at the 2014 Commonwealth Games, riding alongside Louise Haston in the Sprint. The pair were defeated in the final by the English duo of Scott and Sophie Thornhill.

McGlynn took her second silver medal for the 2014 Commonwealth Games, in the Kilo. McGlynn and Haston were the first tandem to go sub 1:10, recording a time of 1:09.771. Gold went to England's Thornhill & Scott.

In 2021, at age 48, McGlynn reunited with Helen Scott to take silver at the 2020 Tokyo Paralympics in the women's time trial B in a personal best of 1:06.743.

McGlynn guided by Ellie Stone achieved silver in the women's tandem sprint B and bronze in the tandem 1km time trial B at the 2022 Commonwealth Games in Birmingham.

== Awards ==
2004
1st Women's Tandem Kilo (B 1–3), 2004 Summer Paralympics
2nd Women's Tandem Sprint (B 1–3), 2004 Summer Paralympics
2nd Disability Omnium, British National Track Championships

2005
1st Tandem Kilo, VISA Paralympic World Cup
1st Tandem Sprint, VISA Paralympic World Cup
1st Tandem Kilo, European Championships
1st Tandem Kilo, European Open Championships
1st Disability Omnium, British National Track Championships

2006
1st Tandem sprint, VISA Paralympic World Cup (B/VI female)

2007
1st Tandem sprint, VISA Paralympic World Cup (B/VI female)

2008
1st Kilo (B&VI 1–3), 2008 Summer Paralympics
1st Individual pursuit (B&VI 1–3), 2008 Summer Paralympics
