= Zeng Sini =

Chinese Paralympic cyclist (born 1988)

Personal information
- Born: 3 January 1988 (age 37)

Sport
- Country: China
- Sport: Cycling

Zeng Sini (Chinese: 曾思妮; pinyin: Zēng Sīní; born 3 January 1988) is a Chinese cyclist.

== Career ==
She won a gold medal in the Women's individual pursuit C1-2-3 event at the 2012 Summer Paralympics.
