= Alexandra Lisney =

Australian cyclist and rower

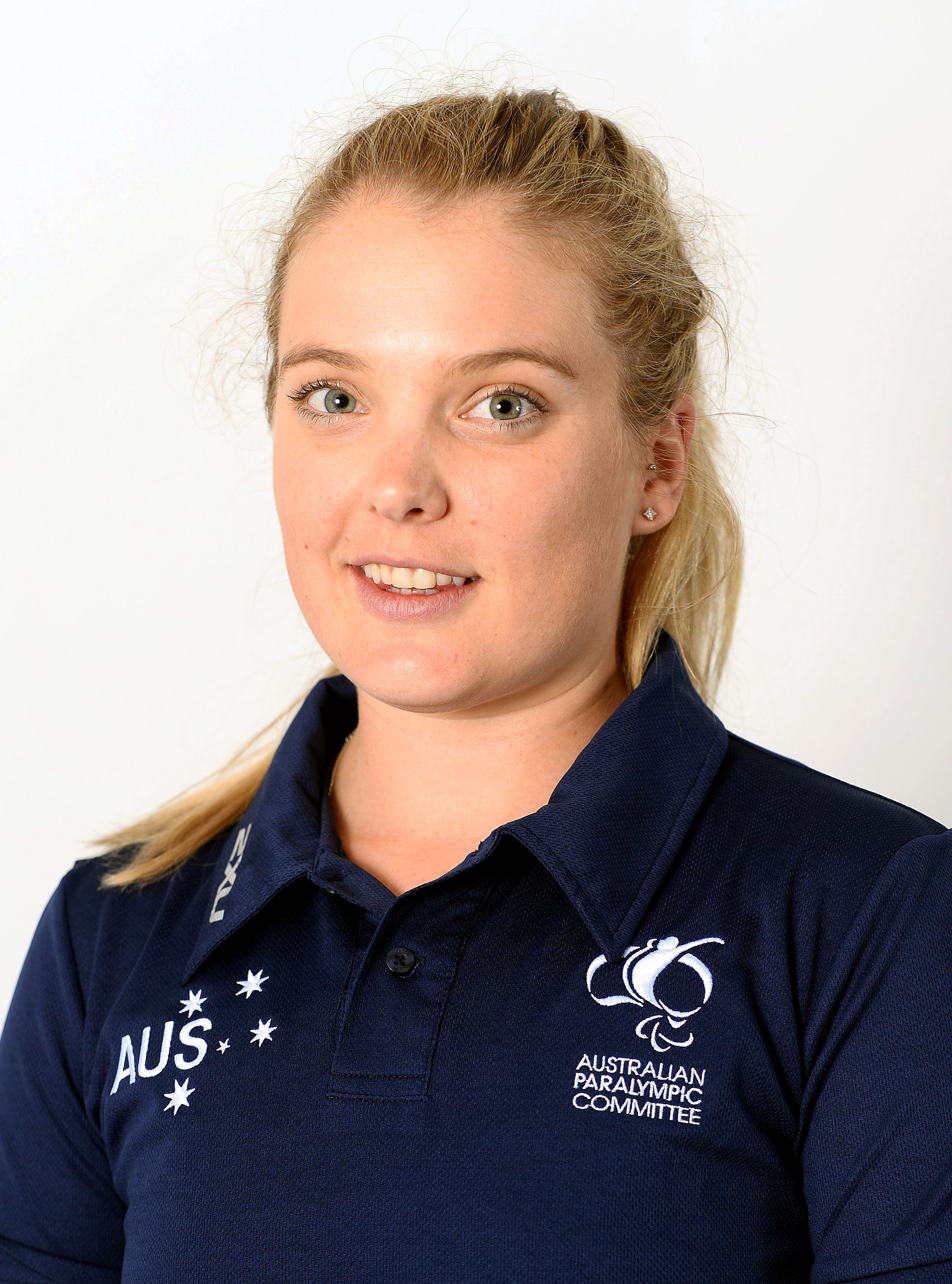
- Portrait of Australian 2016 Paralympic Team member Alexandra Green.

Personal information
- Nationality: Australian
- Born: 2 July 1987 (age 39) Sydney, Australia

Sport
- Country: Australia
- Sport: Cycling
- Disability class: C4
- Club: Manly Warringah Cycling Club
Medal record
Women's track cycling
Paralympic Games
Bronze medal – third place	2012 London	Women's individual pursuit C4
UCI Para-cycling Track World Championships
Bronze medal – third place	2011 Montichiari	Women's individual pursuit C4
Gold medal – first place	2012 Los Angeles	Women's individual pursuit C4
Silver medal – second place	2014 Aguascalientes	Women's individual pursuit C4
Bronze medal – third place	2016 Montichiari	Women's individual pursuit C4
UCI Para-cycling Road World Championships
Silver medal – second place	2015 Nottwil	Women's Time Trial C4

Alexandra Lisney (née Green; born 2 July 1987) is an Australian rower and cyclist. She won a bronze medal in the Women's Individual Pursuit C4 at the 2012 Summer Paralympics. She represented Australian at the 2016 Rio Paralympics.

== Personal ==
Green was born ten weeks premature on 2 July 1987 in Sydney, Australia. She has cerebral palsy that affects the left side of her body. As of 2016, she lives in Sydney, Australia and was a student at the University of New South Wales, where she graduated with a Bachelor of Mechanical Engineering. She is employed as a structural engineer. She was married in September 2015.

== Adaptive rowing ==
Lisney took up adaptive rowing in 2008 following an Australian Paralympic Committee talent search event. She went on to make the national team within one year of participating in the sport with her first appearance at the 2009 World Rowing Championships in Poland.

== Cycling ==
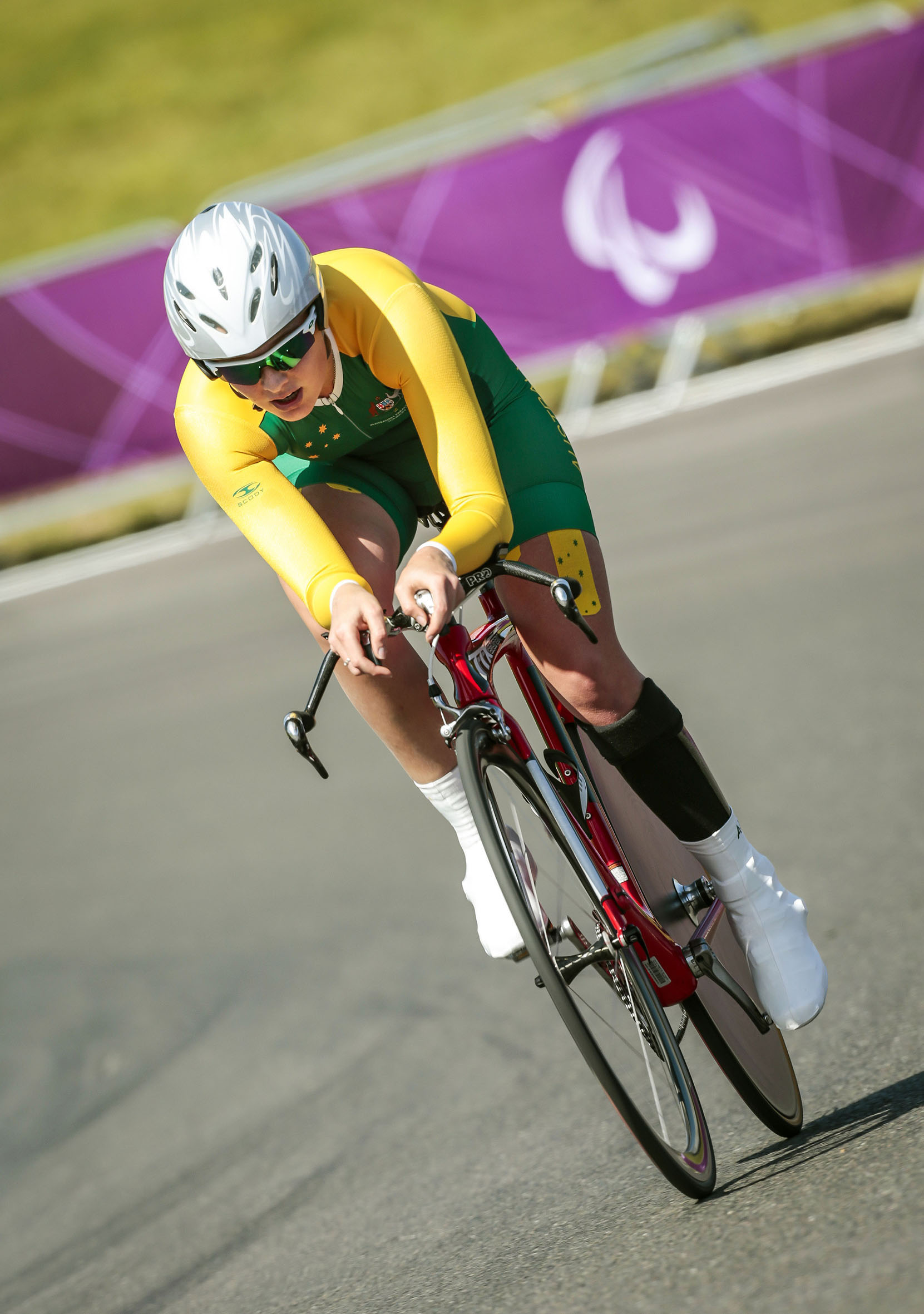
Green at the 2012 London Paralympics

Lisney is a C4 classified cyclist, and a member of Manly Warringah Cycling Club. She took up the sport in 2010. That year, at the NSW Track State Championships, she finished first in the C3 individual pursuit. She first represented Australia in 2011. Green won the bronze medal in the Women's Individual Pursuit C4 at the 2011UCI Para-cycling Track World Championships in Montichiari, Italy. At the 2011 Sydney hosted World Cup, she finished second in the women's 53.7 km C4 road race. In 2012, she participated in the UCI Para-cycling Track World Championships in Los Angeles, where she finished first in the C4 women's 3000m Individual Pursuit earning her a gold medal and the world champion's striped jersey. Alex also finished fourth in the 500m Time Trial and sixth in the C4/C5 women's scratch race.

She was selected to represent Australia at the 2012 Summer Paralympics in cycling. In the lead up to the Paralympics, she participated in the Blenheim Palace festival of cycling time trial event. At the 2012 Summer ParalympicsLisney participated in the Women's Road Race C4-5, Women's Time Trial C4, Women's 500m Time Trial C4-5 and Women's Individual Pursuit C4 – winning a bronze in the Individual Pursuit. Competing at the 2014 UCI Para-cycling Track World Championships in Aguascalientes, Mexico, she won a silver medal in the Women's Individual Pursuit C4.

At the 2015 UCI Para-cycling Road World Championships, Nottwil, Switzerland, she won the silver medal in the Women's Time Trial C4 and finished fifth in the Women's Road Race C4. At the 2016 UCI Para-cycling Track World Championships in Montichiari, Italy, she won the bronze medal in the Women's 3 km Individual Pursuit C4.

At the 2016 Rio Paralympics, she competed in four events. Her best results were fourth in the Women's Road Time Trial C4 and seventh in the Women's Road Race C4-5.
