= Anna Harkowska =

Polish Paralympic cyclist

Personal information
- Born: 20 March 1980 (age 46) Świnoujście, Poland

Sport
- Sport: Para-cycling
Medal record
Representing Poland
Women's para road cycling
Paralympic Games
| Silver medal – second place | 2012 London | Road time trial C4 |
| Silver medal – second place | 2012 London | Road race C4-5 |
| Silver medal – second place | 2016 Rio | Road race C4-5 |
| Silver medal – second place | 2016 Rio | Road time trial C5 |
Road World Championships
| Silver medal – second place | 2025 Ronse | Road race C5 |
Women's para track cycling
Paralympic Games
| Silver medal – second place | 2012 London | Individual pursuit C5 |
Track World Championships
| Gold medal – first place | 2016 Montichiari | Scratch race C4-C5 |
| Silver medal – second place | 2025 Rio de Janeiro | Scratch race C5 |
| Bronze medal – third place | 2016 Montichiari | Individual pursuit C5 |
| Bronze medal – third place | 2025 Rio de Janeiro | Elimination C5 |
| Bronze medal – third place | 2026 Apeldoorn | Elimination C5 |

Anna Harkowska (Polish pronunciation: [ˈanna xarˈkɔfska]; born 20 March 1980) is a Polish cyclist. She trained running and took up triathlon, and eventually focused her efforts on cycling. In May 2002, she was hit by a motorist in Szczecin, sustaining 26 fractures in her legs and nearly losing her left leg. After several surgeries and months of rehabilitation, she returned to professional cycling. In 2012, she participated in the 2012 Summer Paralympics in London, where she won three silver medals.
