= Fiona Southorn =

New Zealand Paralympic cyclist

Personal information
- Born: 8 October 1967 (age 58) Tokoroa, New Zealand
Medal record
Representing New Zealand
Women's para-cycling
Paralympic Games
| Bronze medal – third place | 2012 London | Individual pursuit C5 |
Women's para-duathlon
World Championships
| Gold medal – first place | 2015 Adelaide | PT4 |
| Gold medal – first place | 2019 Pontevedra | PTS5 |

Fiona Southorn (born 8 October 1967) is a New Zealand paralympic cyclist who represented New Zealand at the 2004 Summer Paralympics, 2008 Summer Paralympics and the 2012 Summer Paralympics.

Born in Tokoroa and living in Waipu in Northland, Southorn, who is missing her left hand, won a bronze medal in the C5 individual pursuit at the 2012 London Paralympics.
