= Susan Powell (cyclist) =

Australian Paralympic cyclist

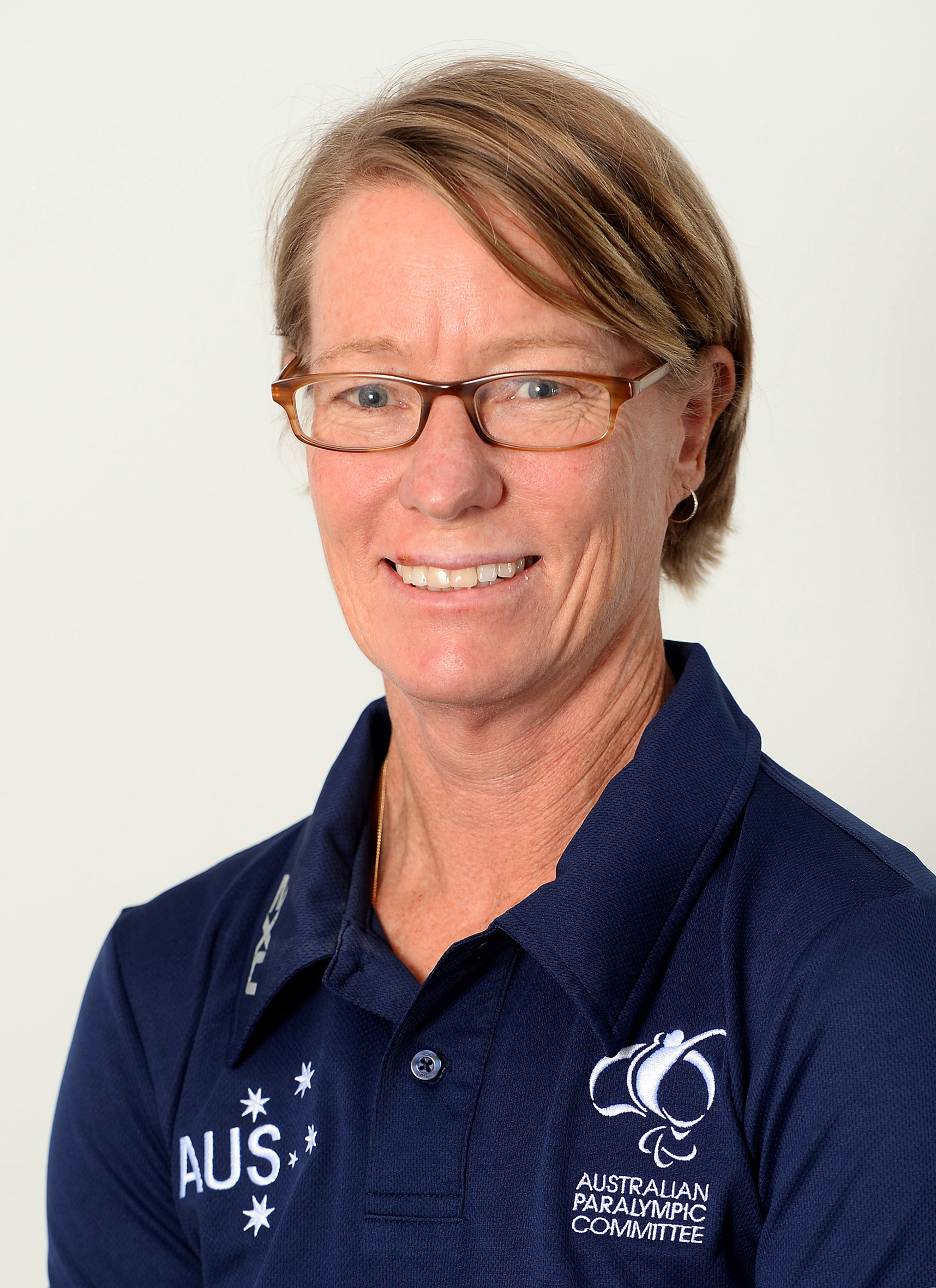
- 2016 Australian Paralympic team portrait of Powell

Personal information
- Nationality: Australian
- Born: 30 May 1967 (age 59) Nowra, New South Wales

Sport
- Country: Australia
- Sport: Cycling
- Disability class: C4
- Club: Vikings Cycling Club ACT
Medal record
Women's cycling
Paralympic Games
Gold medal – first place	2012 London	Women's Individual Pursuit C4
Silver medal – second place	2012 London	Women's Individual C 4 Road Time Trial
Silver medal – second place	2016 Rio de Janeiro	Women's Individual Pursuit C4
Bronze medal – third place	2016 Rio de Janeiro	Women's road time trial C4
UCI Para-cycling Road World Championships
Gold medal – first place	2009 Bogono	Women's Individual Time Trial LC2
Silver medal – second place	2009 Bogono	Women's Road Race LC2
Silver medal – second place	2010 Baie-Comeau	Women's Individual Time Trial C2
Bronze medal – third place	2010 Baie-Comeau	Women's Road Race C2
Gold medal – first place	2011 Roskilde	Women's Individual Time Trial C4
Gold medal – first place	2011 Roskilde	Women's Road Race C4
Bronze medal – third place	2013 Baie-Comeau	Women's Individual Time Trial C4
Bronze medal – third place	2013 Baie-Comeau	Women's Road Race C4
Silver medal – second place	2014 Greenville	Women's Road Race C4
Bronze medal – third place	2014 Greenville	Women's Individual Time Trial C4
Silver medal – second place	2015 Nottwil	Women's Road Race C4
UCI Para-cycling Track World Championships
Gold medal – first place	2011 Montichiari	Women's 3 km Individual Pursuit C4
Silver medal – second place	2011 Montichiari	Women's Time Trial C4
Silver medal – second place	2012 Los Angeles	Women's Time Trial C4
Silver medal – second place	2012 Los Angeles	Women's 3 km Individual Pursuit C4
Bronze medal – third place	2012 Los Angeles	Women's Scratch Race C4-5
Gold medal – first place	2014 Aguascalientes	Women's 3 km Individual Pursuit C4
Bronze medal – third place	2014 Aguascalientes	Women's Time Trial C4
Gold medal – first place	2015 Appledorn	Women's 3 km Individual Pursuit C4
Bronze medal – third place	2015 Appledorn	Women's Time Trial C4
Silver medal – second place	2016 Montichiari	Women's 3 km Individual Pursuit C4

Susan "Sue" Powell, OAM (born 30 May 1967) is an Australian cyclist. At the 2012 London Paralympics, she won a gold medal in the Women's Individual Pursuit C4, setting a new world record in the process, and a silver medal in the Women's Individual Pursuit C4. At the 2016 Rio Paralympics, Powell won the silver medal in the 3 km Women's Individual Pursuit C4.

== Personal ==
Susan Jennifer Powell was born on 30 May 1967 in the New South Wales city of Nowra. In 2007, she had a spinal cord injury, which caused weakness in her right leg, due to a field hockey accident. She has a Bachelor of Applied Science, a Master of Environmental Science and a PhD in Environmental Science. As of 2012, she lives in the Australian Capital Territory where she is a Research Fellow at the University of Canberra specialising in riverine and wetland ecology and hydrology.

== Cycling ==
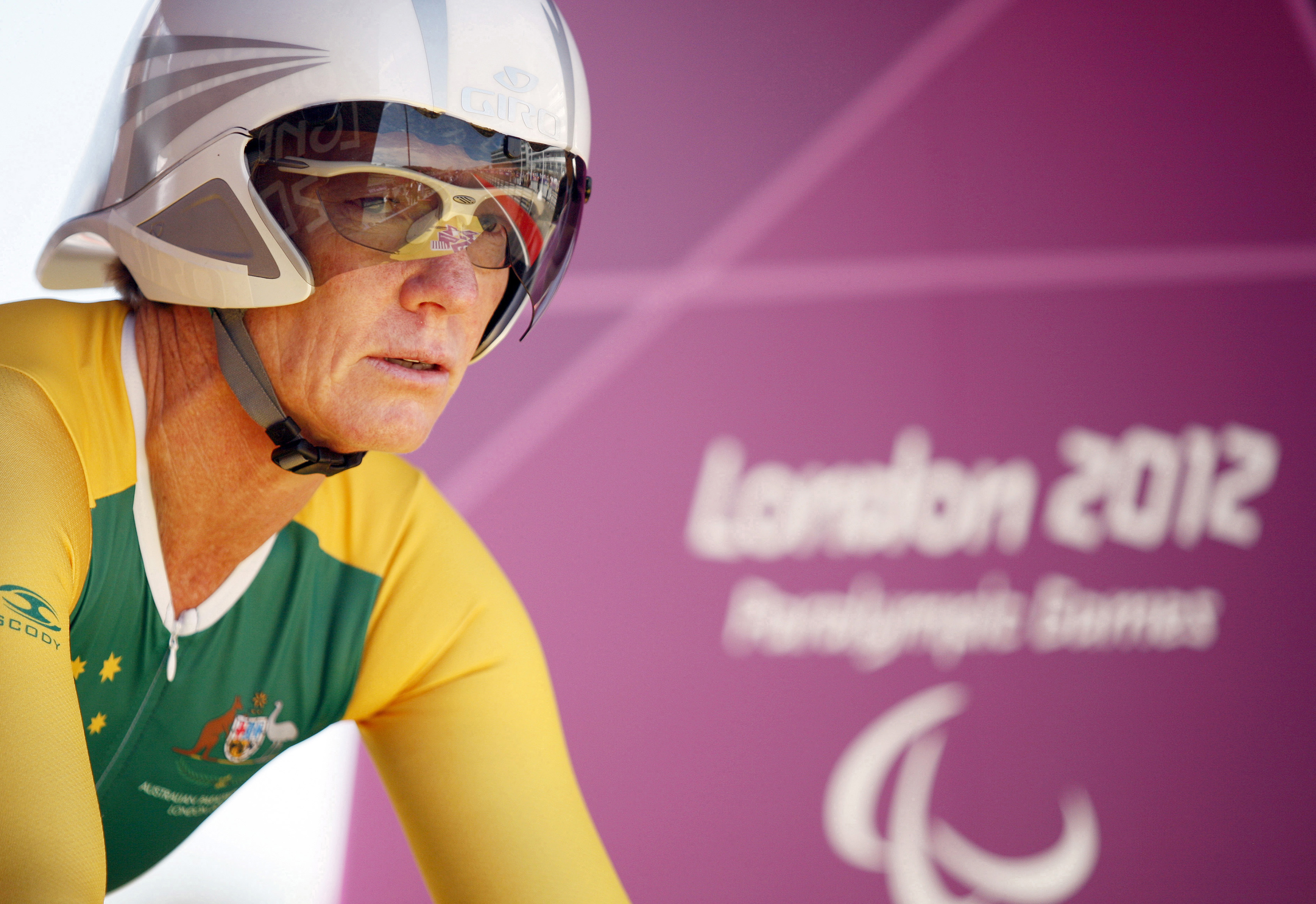
Powell at the 2012 London Paralympics

Powell is a C4 classified cyclist. She is a member of the Vikings Cycling Club ACT, and is coached by Sian Mulholland and Glenn Doney.

Powell initially began cycling to improve her fitness for hockey and golf. After the hockey accident, she found that she could still participate in cycling, so she took the sport more seriously. She made her Australian national team debut at the 2009 Para-cycling Road World Championships and has since won 6 world championships (3xPursuit, Road and 2x Road TT). Sue has been named Champion of Champions at four consecutive Australian Paracycling Track Championships as well as three times Female Paracyclist of the Year.

At the 2012 London Paralympics, she won a gold medal in the Women's Individual Pursuit C4, setting a new world record in the process, and a silver medal in the Women's Time Trial C4. Competing at the 2013 Para-cycling Road World Championships in Baie-Comeau, Canada, she won two bronze medals in the Women's Individual Time Trial C4 and Women's Road Race C4.

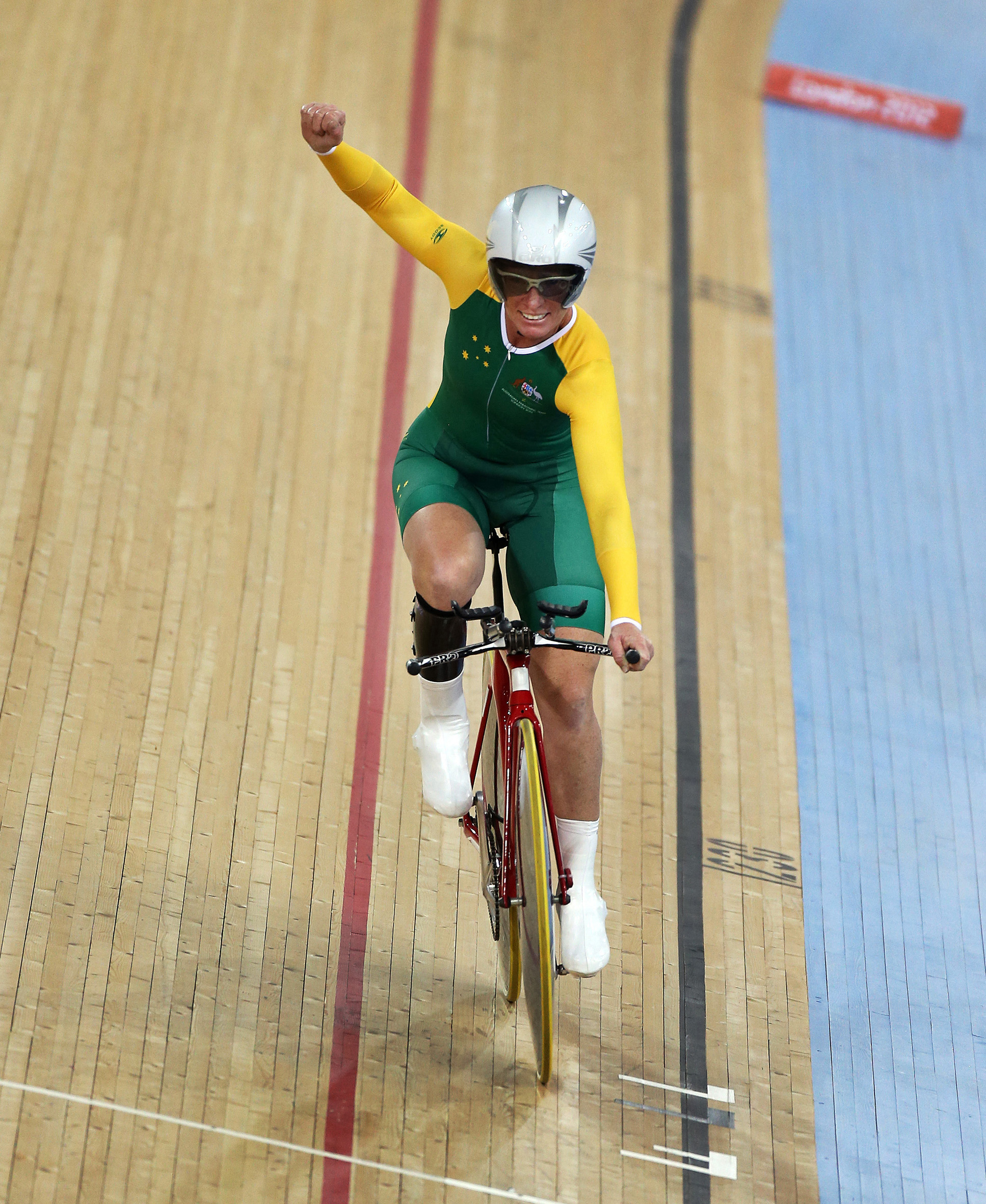
Powell at the 2012 London Paralympics

At the 2014 UCI Para-cycling Track World Championships in Aguascalientes, Mexico, she won a gold medal in the Women's 3 km Individual Pursuit C4, a bronze medal in the Women's Time Trial C4 and finished fourth in the Women's C1-5 Scratch Race. Competing at the 2014 UCI Para-cycling Road World Championships in Greenville, South Carolina, Powell won two medals - silver medal in the Women's Road Race C4 and bronze medal in the Women's Time Trial C4.

Powell repeated her 2014 results at the 2015 UCI Para-cycling Track World Championships in Appledorn, Netherlands by winning the gold medal in the Women's 3 km Individual Pursuit C4 and a bronze medal in the Women's Time Trial C4. At the 2015 UCI Para-cycling Road World Championships in Nottwil, Switzerland, she won the silver medal in the Women's Road Race C4 and finished fourth in the Women's Time Trial Race C4. The following year she finished second to Shawn Morelli in the Women's 3 km Individual Pursuit C4 at the 2016 UCI Para-cycling Track World Championships in Montichiari, Italy. Powell broke her sea-level personal best time twice in the competition. In May 2016 she was selected in the Australian team for the 2016 Rio Paralympics.

At the 2016 Rio Paralympics, Powell won the silver medal in the Women's 3 km Individual Pursuit C4. It was Australia's first medal of the games. She followed the silver medal with a bronze medal in the Women's Road Time Trial C4. Powell's other results were eight in the Women's 500 m Time Trial C4-5 and ninth in the Women's Road Race C4-5.

She held a scholarship with the ACT Academy of Sport.

== Recognition ==
Powell was awarded an Order of Australia Medal in the 2014 Australia Day Honours "for service to sport as a Gold Medallist at the London 2012 Paralympic Games." She was the Australian Capital Territory Female Athlete of the Year and Sportstar of the Year in 2011, 2012 and 2014. In 2014, she was the joint winner with bmx rider Caroline Buchanan and joined basketballer Lauren Jackson as the only triple winner. She was Cycling Australia's Female Paracyclist of the Year in 2009, 2010 and 2011. In 2016, she was named Athlete of the Year – Para Sport at the Canberra Sport Awards. In 2026, she was inducted into the ACT Sport Hall of Fame.
