= Phillipa Gray =

New Zealand Paralympic cyclist

Phillipa Gray MNZM
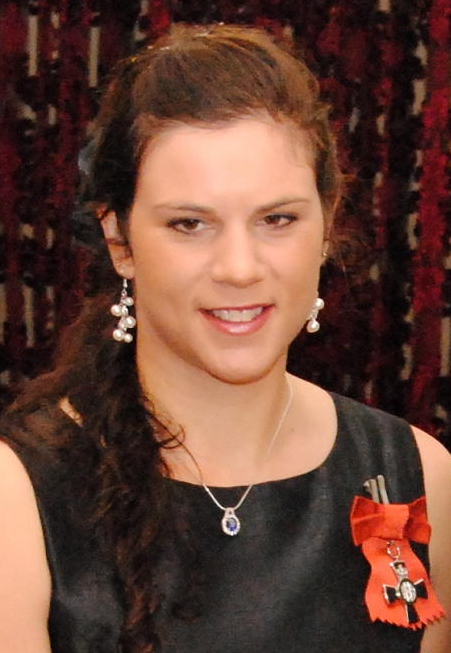
- Gray in 2013

Personal information
- Born: 16 February 1989 (age 37) Thames, New Zealand
Medal record
Representing New Zealand
Paralympic Games
Women's para track cycling
Gold medal – first place	2012 London	Individual pursuit
Bronze medal – third place	2012 London	1km time trial
Women's para road cycling
Silver medal – second place	2012 London	Road time trial

Phillipa Gray MNZM (born 16 February 1989 in Thames, New Zealand) is a New Zealand Paralympic cyclist.

Gray, who is sight and hearing impaired from Usher syndrome, won a gold, silver and bronze medal, with pilot Laura Thompson in the cycling at the 2012 Summer Paralympics.

In the 2013 New Year Honours, Gray was appointed a Member of the New Zealand Order of Merit for services to cycling.
