= Felicity Johnson =

Australian Paralympic cyclist

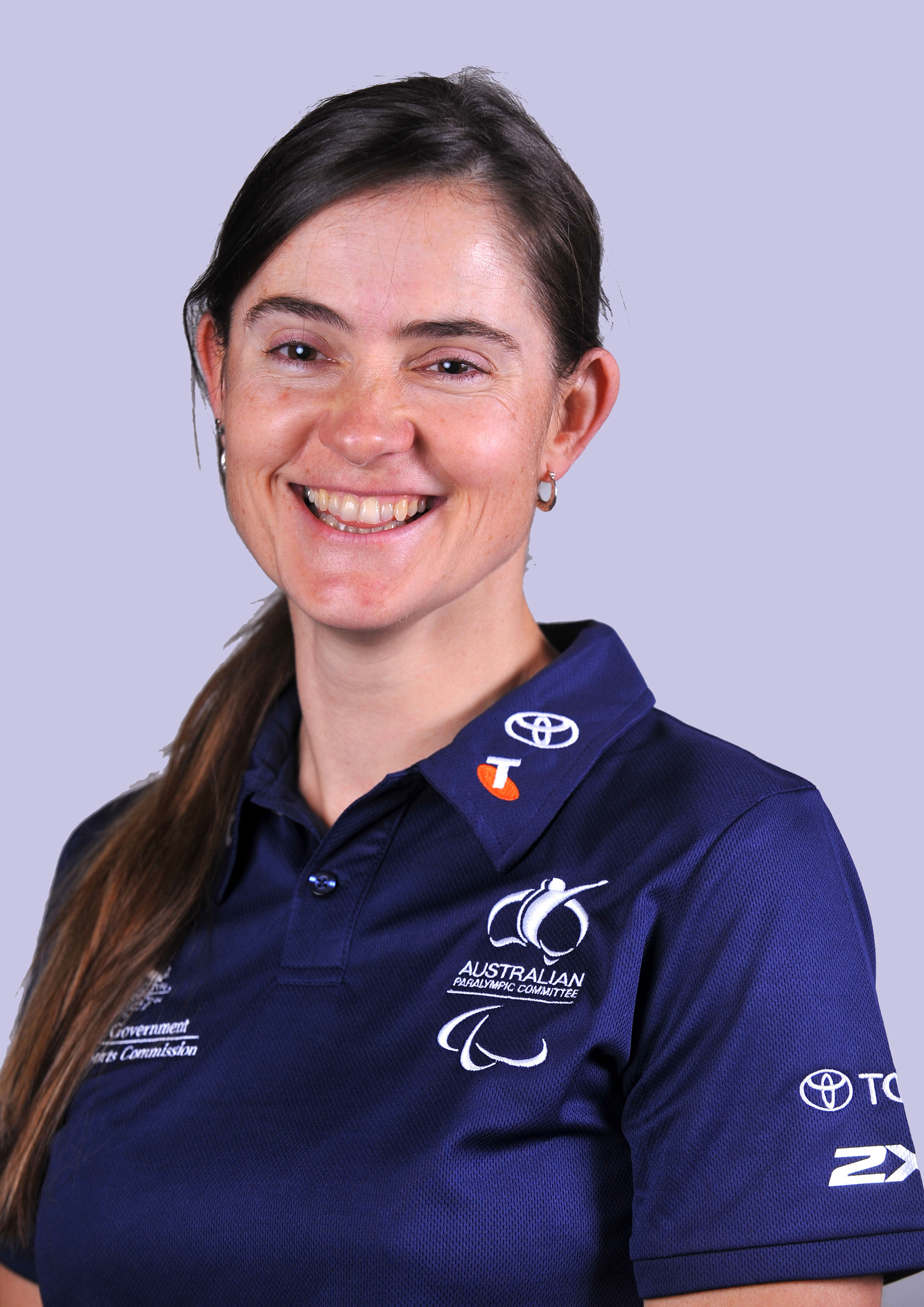
- 2012 Australian Paralympic team portrait of Johnson

Personal information
- Nationality: Australia
- Born: 30 May 1971 (age 55) Canberra, Australian Capital Territory

Sport
- Disability class: B3
Medal record
Women's cycling
Representing Australia
Paralympic Games
Gold medal – first place	2012 London	1 km Time Trial B VI 1–3
Silver medal – second place	2008 Beijing	1 km Time Trial B VI 1–3
IPC World Championships
Silver medal – second place	2007 Bordeaux	1000m Time Trial BVI
UCI Para-cycling Track World Championships
Gold medal – first place	2011 Montichiari	Tandem Time Trial BVI
Gold medal – first place	2012 Carson	Tandem 1 km Time Trial B
Gold medal – first place	2012 Carson	Tandem Sprint B

Felicity Jane Johnson OAM (born 30 May 1971) is an Australian Paralympic tandem cyclist, who won a silver medal at the 2008 Summer Paralympics in Beijing and a gold medal at the 2012 Summer Paralympics in London.

== Personal ==
Felicity Jane Johnson was born on 30 May 1971 with a visual impairment. Her early sporting career was as a track and field athlete and she won two silver medals in the 800 m at the FESPIC Games. She is employed as a support worker with Can Do for Kids, an organisation established for children with sensory disabilities.

== Career ==
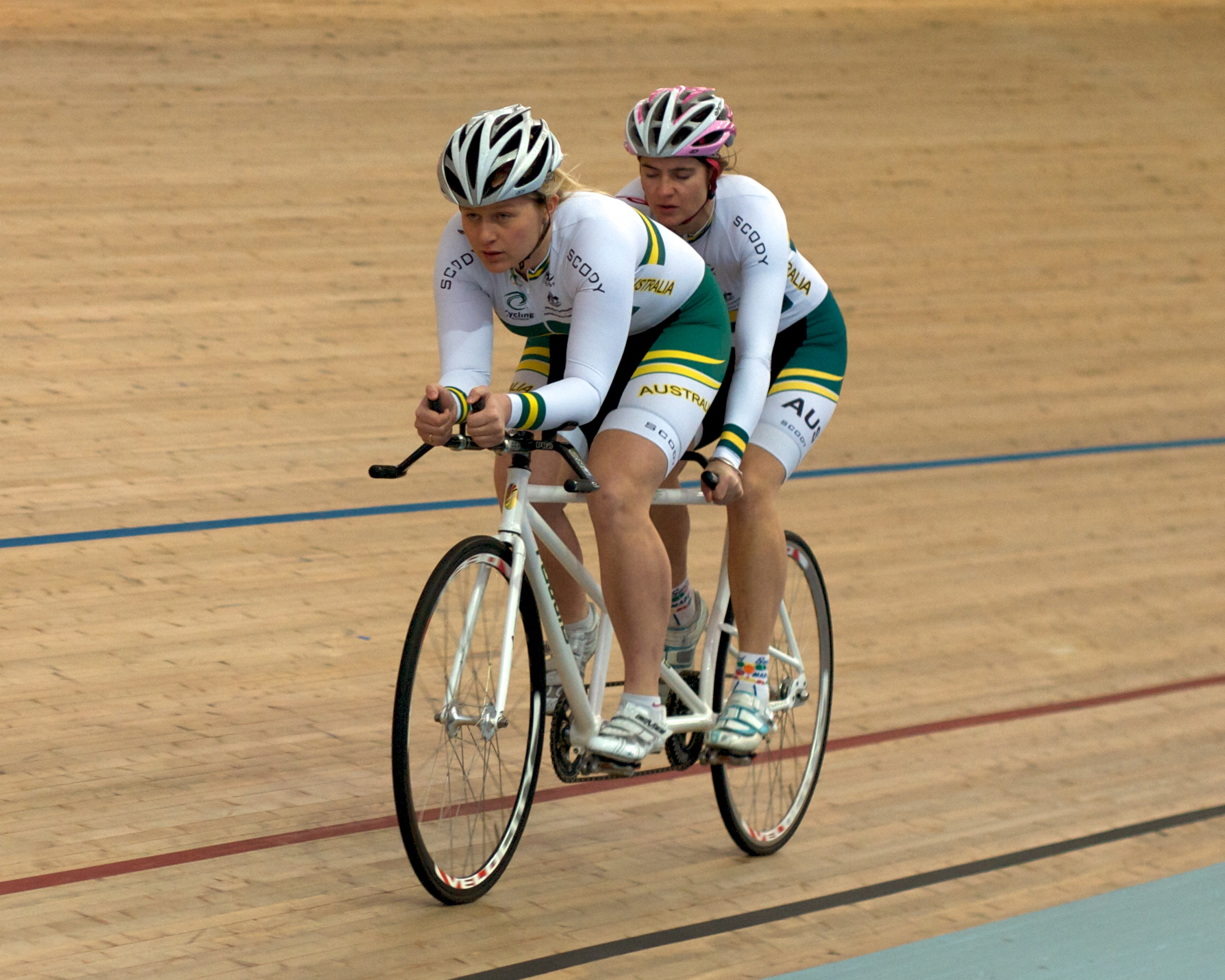
Stephanie Morton and Felicity Johnson riding at the announcement of the 2012 Australian Paralympic cycling team, at which they will be competing.

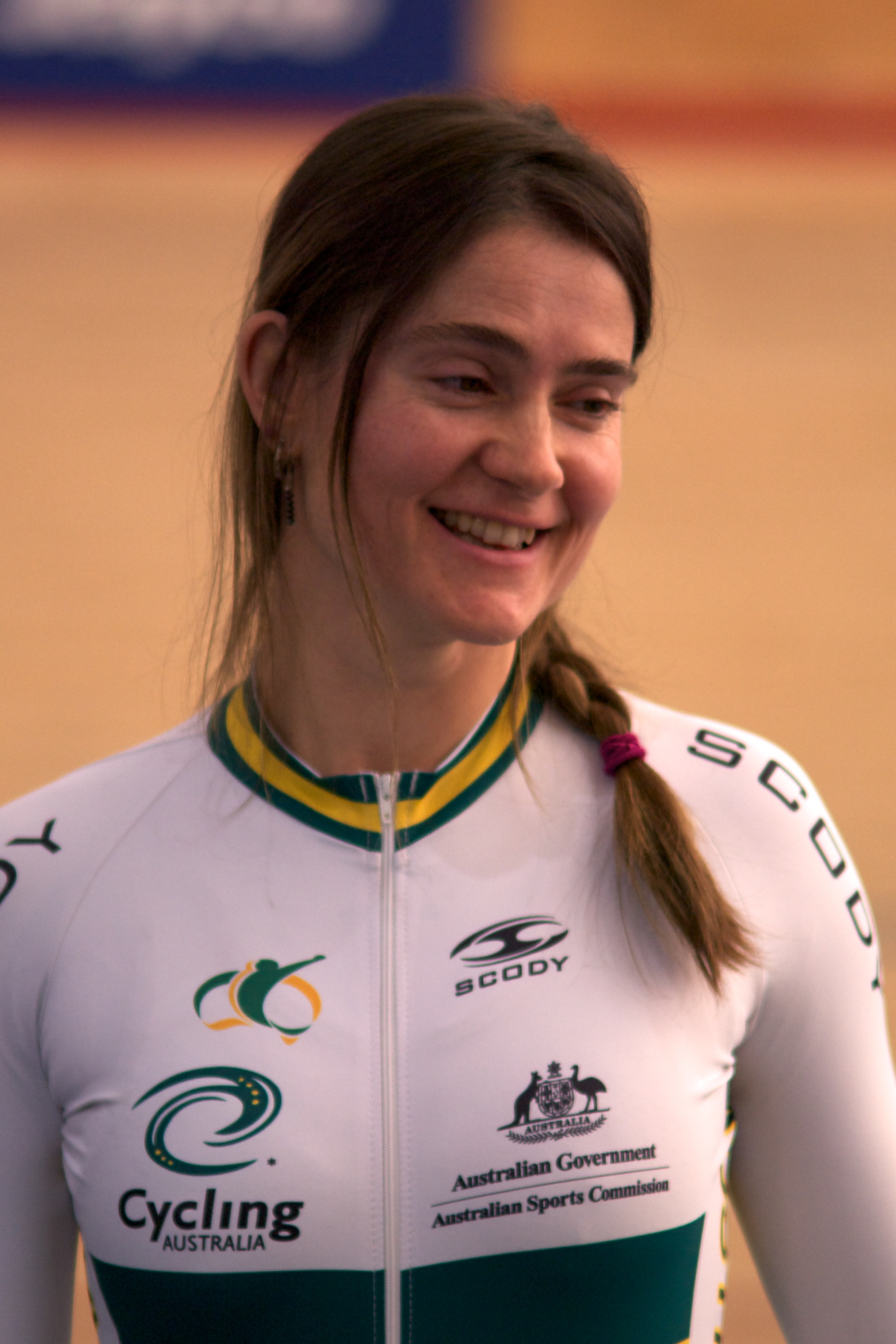
Felicity Johnson

Johnson won a silver medal at the 2008 Beijing Games in the Women's 1 km Time Trial B VI 1–3 event with her pilot Katie Parker. At the 2012 London Paralympics, she won a gold medal in the Women's 1 km Time Trial B with her pilot Stephanie Morton.

In 2014, she was paired with pilot Holly Takos and competed in the Glasgow Commonwealth Games where the South Australian duo placed fourth.

== Recognition ==
Johnson won the National Achievement Award for Best Newcomer in 2007, and was twice named Blind Sportsperson of the Year, in 2010 and 2011. In 2012, she was a finalist for the Australian Paralympian of the Year award She was awarded the Medal of the Order of Australia in the 2014 Australia Day Honours "for service to sport as a Gold Medallist at the London 2012 Paralympic Games."
