= Catherine Walsh (athlete) =

Irish paralympic athlete and cyclist

Medal record

Representing Ireland

Women's para-athletics

Paralympic Games
Bronze medal – third place	1992 Barcelona	Pentathlon P13

Women's para-cycling

Paralympic Games
Silver medal – second place	2012 London	Individual pursuit B
Bronze medal – third place	2012 London	Road time trial B

Women's para-duathlon

World Championships
Gold medal – first place	2010 Edinburgh	TRI 6

Catherine Mary Walsh (born 23 August 1973) is a visually impaired athlete from Ireland. She has competed internationally in both athletics and cycling, winning Paralympic medals in both.

== Career ==
Walsh competed in the 1992 Summer Paralympics, where she won a bronze medal, and the 1996 Summer Paralympics, where she did not secure a medal in track and field. Later, she competed at the 2000 Summer Paralympics, where she earned a bronze medal in the women's Pentathlon - P13 event. However, in 2007, she switched from a track and field athlete to a cycling athlete, winning silver at the 2009 International Cycling Federation Para-Cycling Track World Championships.

She continued her success in cycling with a World Championship bronze medal in 2011 and a gold medal in the 3 km Individual Pursuit at the UCI Track Cycling World Championships. During the 2012 Summer Paralympics, Walsh earned a silver medal in Women's Individual Pursuit B, and a bronze medal in Women's Time Trial B. She had announced her retirement after these Games.

She won a gold medal at the Strathclyde International Triathlon Union (ITU) World Para Triathlon Event in 2016 and named to Team Ireland's 2016 Paralympic Games PT5 triathlon roster.
