= Event winners at the 2012 Summer Paralympics =

This article contains a chronological summary of major events from the 2012 Summer Paralympics in London.

All times are in British Summer Time (UTC+1).

== Calendar ==
All dates are British Summer Time (UTC+1)

OC	Opening ceremony	●	Event competitions	1	Gold medal events	CC	Closing ceremony

August/September 2012		August			September									Events
August/September 2012		29th Wed	30th Thu	31st Fri	1st Sat	2nd Sun	3rd Mon	4th Tue	5th Wed	6th Thu	7th Fri	8th Sat	9th Sun	Events
Ceremonies		OC											CC	—N/a
Archery			●	●	●	●	4	3	2					9
Athletics				11	17	20	17	21	20	21	16	23	4	170
Boccia						●	●	3	●	●	●	4		7
Cycling	Road cycling								18	4	6	4		50
Cycling	Track cycling		5	5	5	3								50
Equestrian			●	●	2	3	2	4						11
Football	5-a-side			●	●	●	●	●	●	●	●	1		2
Football	7-a-side				●	●	●	●	●	●	●		1	2
Goalball			●	●	●	●	●	●	●	●	2			2
Judo			4	4	5									13
Powerlifting			2	3	3	3	3	3	3					20
Rowing				●	●	4								4
Sailing					●	●	●	●	●	3				3
Shooting			2	2	2	1	1	1	1	2				12
Swimming			15	15	15	14	14	15	15	15	15	15		148
Table tennis			●	●	●	11	10	●	●	●	4	4		29
Volleyball			●	●	●	●	●	●	●	●	1	1		2
Wheelchair basketball			●	●	●	●	●	●	●	●	1	1		2
Wheelchair fencing								4	4	2	1	1		12
Wheelchair rugby									●	●	●	●	1	1
Wheelchair tennis					●	●	●	●	1	●	2	3		6
Daily medal events			28	40	49	59	51	54	64	47	48	57	6	503
Cumulative total			28	68	117	176	227	281	345	392	440	497	503	503
August/September 2012		29th Wed	30th Thu	31st Fri	1st Sat	2nd Sun	3rd Mon	4th Tue	5th Wed	6th Thu	7th Fri	8th Sat	9th Sun	Total events
August/September 2012		August			September									Total events

=== 29 August ===
Opening ceremony – The opening ceremony took place from 20:00 to 0:20 and featured public figures in attendance, as well as Stephen Hawking. The Cauldron was lit by Margaret Maughan, while Queen Elizabeth II opened the games.

=== 30 August ===
Cycling

- Women's individual pursuit C1-3
- Women's individual pursuit C4
- Women's individual pursuit C5
- Men's individual pursuit B
- Men's time trial C1-3

Judo

- Men's 60 kg
- Men's 66 kg
- Women's 48 kg
- Women's 52 kg

Powerlifting

- Women's 40 kg
- Men's 48 kg

Shooting

- Men's 10 metre air pistol SH1
- Women's 10 metre air rifle standing SH1

Swimming

- Men's 50 metre freestyle S5
- Men's 400 metre freestyle S12
- Men's 100 metre butterfly S8
- Men's 100 metre butterfly S9
- Men's 50 metre breaststroke SB2
- Men's 100 metre backstroke S6
- Men's 100 metre backstroke S7
- Men's 200 metre individual medley SM10
- Women's 50 metre freestyle S5
- Women's 400 metre freestyle S12
- Women's 100 metre butterfly S8
- Women's 100 metre butterfly S9
- Women's 100 metre backstroke S6
- Women's 100 metre backstroke S7
- Women's 200 metre individual medley SM10

Gold medalists
Sport	Event	Competitor(s)	NPC	Rec	Ref
Cycling	Women's individual pursuit C1-3	Sini Zheng	China		
Cycling	Women's individual pursuit C4	Susan Powell	Australia		
Cycling	Women's individual pursuit C5	Sarah Storey	Great Britain		
Cycling	Men's individual pursuit B	Kieran Modra	Australia		
Cycling	Men's time trial C1-3	Zhang Yu Li	China		
Judo	Men's 60 kg	Ramin Ibrahimov	Azerbaijan		
Judo	Men's 66 kg	Davyd Kohrava	Ukraine		
Judo	Women's 48 kg	Carmen Brussig	Germany		
Judo	Women's 52 kg	Ramona Brussig	Germany		
Powerlifting	Women's 40 kg	Yakubu Adesokan	Nigeria	WR	
Powerlifting	Men's 48 kg	Nazmiye Muslu	Turkey		
Shooting	Men's 10 metre air pistol SH1	Seakyun Park	South Korea		
Shooting	Women's 10 metre air rifle standing SH1	Cuiping Zhang	China	WR	
Swimming	Men's 50 metre freestyle S5	Daniel Dias	Brazil	WR	
Swimming	Men's 400 metre freestyle S12	Sergey Punko	Russia		
Swimming	Men's 100 metre butterfly S8	Charles Rozoy	France		
Swimming	Men's 100 metre butterfly S9	Tamás Sors	Hungary		
Swimming	Men's 50 metre breaststroke SB2	Jianping Du	China	AS	
Swimming	Men's 100 metre backstroke S6	Tao Zheng	China	WR	
Swimming	Men's 100 metre backstroke S7	Jonathan Fox	Great Britain		
Swimming	Men's 200 metre individual medley SM10	Benoit Huot	Canada	WR	
Swimming	Women's 50 metre freestyle S5	Natalia Prologaieva	Ukraine		
Swimming	Women's 400 metre freestyle S12	Oxana Savchenko	Russia		
Swimming	Women's 100 metre butterfly S8	Jessica Long	United States	PR	
Swimming	Women's 100 metre butterfly S9	Natalie du Toit	South Africa		
Swimming	Women's 100 metre backstroke S6	Dong Lu	China	WR	
Swimming	Women's 100 metre backstroke S7	Jacqueline Freney	Australia	PR	
Swimming	Women's 200 metre individual medley SM10	Sophie Pascoe	New Zealand	WR	

=== 31 August ===
Athletics

- Men's club throw F31/32/51
- Women's long jump F37–38
- Women's discus throw F35–36
- Men's shot put F42–44
- Men's 200 metres T37
- Women's 100 metres T34
- Men's discus throw F57–58
- Men's shot put F52–53
- Men's long jump F42–44
- Women's discus throw F40
- Women's 200 metres T35

Cycling

- Women's individual B 1 km time trial
- Men's individual pursuit C1
- Men's individual pursuit C2
- Men's individual pursuit C3
- Men's individual C4-5 1 km time trial

Judo

- Men's 73 kg
- Men's 81 kg
- Women's 57 kg
- Women's 63 kg

Powerlifting

- Women's 44 kg
- Men's 52 kg
- Men's 56 kg

Shooting

- Men's 10 metre air rifle standing SH1
- Women's 10 metre air pistol SH1

Swimming

- Men's 400 metre freestyle S8
- Women's 400 metre freestyle S8
- Men's 50 metre butterfly S7
- Women's 50 metre butterfly S7
- Men's 50 metre freestyle S10
- Women's 50 metre freestyle S10
- Men's 100 metre backstroke S9
- Women's 100 metre backstroke S9
- Men's 100 metre freestyle S11
- Women's 100 metre freestyle S11
- Men's 100 metre backstroke S14
- Women's 100 metre backstroke S14
- Men's 100 metre butterfly S13
- Women's 200 metre individual medley SM5
- Men's 50 metre freestyle S4

Gold medalists
Sport	Event	Competitor(s)	NOC	Rec	Ref
Athletics	Men's club throw F31/32/51	Zeljko Dimitrijevic	Serbia		
Athletics	Women's long jump F37–38	Margarita Goncharova	Russia		
Athletics	Women's discus throw F35–36	Qing Wu	China	WR	
Athletics	Men's shot put F42–44	Jackie Christiansen	Denmark	PR	
Athletics	Men's 200 metres T37	Roman Kapranov	Russia	=WR	
Athletics	Women's 100 metres T34	Hannah Cockroft	Great Britain	PR	
Athletics	Men's discus throw F57–58	Alexey Ashapatov	Russia	WR	
Athletics	Men's shot put F52–53	Aigars Apinis	Latvia	WR	
Athletics	Men's long jump F42–44	Markus Rehm	Germany	WR	
Athletics	Women's discus throw F40	Najat el Garraa	Morocco	WR	
Athletics	Women's 200 metres T35	Liu Ping	China		
Cycling	Women's individual B 1 km time trial	Stephanie Morton	Australia	PR	
Cycling	Men's individual pursuit C1	Mark Lee Colbourne	Great Britain		
Cycling	Men's individual pursuit C2	Guihua Liang	China		
Cycling	Men's individual pursuit C3	Joseph Berenyi	United States		
Cycling	Men's individual C4-5 1 km time trial	Alfonso Cabello	Spain	PR	
Judo	Men's 73 kg	Dymtro Solovey	Ukraine		
Judo	Men's 81 kg	Olekandr Kosinov	Ukraine		
Judo	Women's 57 kg	Afag Sultanova	Azerbaijan		
Judo	Women's 63 kg	Dalidaivis Rodriques Clark	Cuba		
Powerlifting	Women's 44 kg	Ivory Nwokorie	Nigeria		
Powerlifting	Men's 52 kg	Qi Feng	China		
Powerlifting	Men's 56 kg	Sherif Othman	Egypt		
Shooting	Men's 10 metre air rifle standing SH1	Dong Chao	China		
Shooting	Women's 10 metre air pistol SH1	Olivera Nakovska-Bikova	Macedonia	PR	
Swimming	Men's 400 metre freestyle S8	Yinan Wang	China	AS	
Swimming	Women's 400 metre freestyle S8	Jessica Long	United States	WR	
Swimming	Men's 50 metre butterfly S7	Shiyun Pan	China	WR	
Swimming	Women's 50 metre butterfly S7	Jacqueline Freney	Australia	OC	
Swimming	Men's 50 metre freestyle S10	André Brasil	Brazil	WR	
Swimming	Women's 50 metre freestyle S10	Summer Ashley Mortimer	Canada	WR	
Swimming	Men's 100 metre backstroke S9	Matthew Cowdrey	Australia	PR	
Swimming	Women's 100 metre backstroke S9	Ellie Cole	Australia	OC	
Swimming	Men's 100 metre freestyle S11	Bradley Snyder	United States		
Swimming	Women's 100 metre freestyle S11	Cecilia Camellini	Italy	WR	
Swimming	Men's 100 metre backstroke S14	Marc Evers	Netherlands	WR	
Swimming	Women's 100 metre backstroke S14	Bethany Firth	Ireland		
Swimming	Men's 100 metre butterfly S13	Ihar Boki	Belarus	PR	
Swimming	Women's 200 metre individual medley SM5	Nataliia Prologaieva	Ukraine	WR	
Swimming	Men's 50 metre freestyle S4	Eskender Mustafaiev	Ukraine		

=== 1 September ===
Athletics

- Women's club throw F31/32/51
- Men's shot put F54/55/56
- Men's long jump F13
- Men's 200 metres T42
- Women's discus throw F11/12
- Women's 200 metres T36
- Women's 100 metres T38
- Women's shot put F54/55/56
- Men's javelin throw F33/34
- Men's 100 metres T13
- Men's triple jump F46
- Men's 100 metres T35
- Women's javelin throw F46
- Women's 200 metres T52
- Men's 800 metres T37
- Men's 100 metres T38
- Women's 200 metres T46

Cycling

- Men's individual 1 km time trial B
- Men's individual pursuit C4
- Men's individual pursuit C5
- Women's individual 500m time trial C1-3
- Women's individual 500m time trial C4-5

Equestrian

- Individual Championship Test – Grade II
- Individual Championship Test – Grade Ib

Judo

- Men's 90 kg
- Men's 100 kg
- Men's +100 kg
- Women's 70 kg
- Women's +70 kg

Powerlifting

- Women's 48 kg
- Women's 52 kg
- Men's 60 kg

Shooting

- Mixed R5 10 metre air rifle prone SH2
- Mixed R3 10 metre air rifle prone SH1

Swimming

- Men's 100 metre butterfly S10
- Women's 100 metre butterfly S10
- Men's 400 metre freestyle S6
- Women's 400 metre freestyle S6
- Men's 100 metre breaststroke SB8
- Women's 100 metre breaststroke SB8
- Men's 200 metre freestyle S5
- Women's 200 metre freestyle S5
- Men's 50 metre freestyle S11
- Women's 50 metre freestyle S11
- Men's 50 metre freestyle S13
- Women's 50 metre freestyle S13
- Men's 100 metre breaststroke SB7
- Women's 100 metre breaststroke SB7
- Men's 200 metre freestyle S2

Gold medalists
Sport	Event	Competitor(s)	NPC	Rec	Ref
Athletics	Women's club throw F31/32/51	Maroua Ibrahmi	Tunisia	WR	
Athletics	Men's shot put F54/55/56	Jalil Bagheri Jeddi	Iran	PR	
Athletics	Men's long jump F13	Luis Felipe Gutierrez	Cuba	PR	
Athletics	Men's 200 metres T42	Richard Whitehead	Great Britain	WR	
Athletics	Women's discus throw F11/12	Liangmin Zhang	China	PR	
Athletics	Women's 200 metres T36	Elena Ivanova	Russia		
Athletics	Women's 100 metres T38	Margarita Goncharova	Russia		
Athletics	Women's shot put F54/55/56	Liwan Yang	China	WR	
Athletics	Men's javelin throw F33/34	Mohsen Kaedi	Iran	WR	
Athletics	Men's 100 metres T13	Jason Smyth	Ireland	WR	
Athletics	Men's triple jump F46	Fuliang Liu	China	WR	
Athletics	Men's 100 metres T35	Iurii Tsaruk	Ukraine	WR	RR
Athletics	Women's javelin throw F46	Katarzyna Piekart	Poland	WR	
Athletics	Women's 200 metres T52	Michelle Stilwell	Canada	PR	
Athletics	Men's 800 metres T37	Michael McKillop	Ireland	WR	
Athletics	Men's 100 metres T38	Evan O'Hanlon	Australia	WR	
Athletics	Women's 200 metres T46	Yunidis Castillo	Cuba	WR	
Cycling	Men's individual 1 km time trial B	Neil Fachie	Great Britain	WR	
Cycling	Men's individual pursuit C4	Carol-Eduard Novak	Romania		
Cycling	Men's individual pursuit C5	Michael Gallagher	Australia		
Cycling	Women's individual 500m time trial C1-3	Yin He	China	WR	
Cycling	Women's individual 500m time trial C4-5	Sarah Storey	Great Britain	WR	
Equestrian	Individual Championship Test – Grade II	Natasha Baker on Cabral	Great Britain		
Equestrian	Individual Championship Test – Grade Ib	Joann Formosa on Worldwide PB	Australia		
Judo	Men's 90 kg	Jorge Hierrezuelo Marcillus	Cuba		
Judo	Men's 100 kg	Gwang-Geun Choi	South Korea		
Judo	Men's +100 kg	Kento Masaki	Japan		
Judo	Women's 70 kg	Maria del Carmen Herrera Gomez	Spain		
Judo	Women's +70 kg	Yanping Yuan	China		
Powerlifting	Women's 48 kg	Esther Oyema	Nigeria	WR	
Powerlifting	Women's 52 kg	Joy Onaolapo	Nigeria	WR	
Powerlifting	Men's 60 kg	Nader Moradi	Iran		
Shooting	Mixed R5 10 metre air rifle prone SH2	Vasyl Kovalchuk	Ukraine	PR	
Shooting	Mixed R3 10 metre air rifle prone SH1	Cedric Fevre	France	WR	
Swimming	Men's 100 metre butterfly S10	Andre Brasil	Brazil	PR	
Swimming	Women's 100 metre butterfly S10	Sophie Pascoe	New Zealand	WR	
Swimming	Men's 400 metre freestyle S6	Darragh McDonald	Ireland		
Swimming	Women's 400 metre freestyle S6	Eleanor Simmonds	Great Britain	WR	
Swimming	Men's 100 metre breaststroke SB8	Andriy Kalyna	Ukraine		
Swimming	Women's 100 metre breaststroke SB8	Olesya Vladykina	Russia	WR	
Swimming	Men's 200 metre freestyle S5	Daniel Dias	Brazil	PR	
Swimming	Women's 200 metre freestyle S5	Sarah Louise Rung	Norway		
Swimming	Men's 50 metre freestyle S11	Bozun Yang	China	WR	
Swimming	Women's 50 metre freestyle S11	Cecilia Camellini	Italy	WR	
Swimming	Men's 50 metre freestyle S13	Charles Bouwer	South Africa	AF	
Swimming	Women's 50 metre freestyle S13	Kelley Becherer	United States	AM	
Swimming	Men's 100 metre breaststroke SB7	Blake Cochrane	Australia	WR	
Swimming	Women's 100 metre breaststroke SB7	Jessica Long	United States	PR	
Swimming	Men's 200 metre freestyle S2	Yang Yang	China	PR	

=== 2 September ===
Athletics

- Women's 200 metres T11
- Women's javelin throw F12–13
- Women's shot put F35–36
- Women's long jump F42–44
- Men's 100 metres T36
- Women's 5000 metres T54
- Women's 100 metres T37
- Men's 400 metres T53
- Men's discus throw F42
- Men's 100 metres T52
- Men's javelin throw F44
- Men's 200 metres T46
- Women's long jump F46
- Women's 100 metres T12
- Men's 100 metres T54
- Men's 400 metres T13
- Men's discus throw F11
- Women's 100 metres T53
- Men's 200 metres T44
- Women's 100 metres T44
- Men's 5000 metres T54

Cycling

- Men's individual sprint B
- Women's individual pursuit B
- Mixed team sprint C1-5

Equestrian

- Individual Championship Test – Grade IV
- Individual Championship Test – Grade III
- Individual Championship Test – Grade Ia

Powerlifting

- Women's 56 kg
- Men's 67.5 kg
- Women's 60 kg

Rowing

- Women's single sculls ASW1x
- Men's single sculls ASM1x
- Mixed double sculls TAMix2x
- Mixed coxed four LTAMix4+

Shooting

- Mixed R4 10 metre air rifle standing SH2

Swimming

- Men's 200 metre individual medley SM7
- Women's 200 metre individual medley SM7
- Men's 200 metre freestyle S14
- Women's 200 metre freestyle S14
- Men's 100 metre backstroke S11
- Women's 100 metre backstroke S11
- Men's 100 metre freestyle S13
- Women's 100 metre freestyle S13
- Men's 100 metre butterfly S12
- Men's 150 metre individual medley SM4
- Women's 50 metre freestyle S8
- Men's 150 metre individual medley SM3
- Men's 4 × 100 metre freestyle relay 34pts
- Women's 100 metre butterfly S12

Table tennis

- Women's singles – Class 11
- Men's singles – Class 3
- Men's singles – Class 6
- Women's singles – Class 1–2
- Men's singles – Class 9
- Men's singles – Class 5
- Men's singles – Class 7
- Women's singles – Class 4
- Women's singles – Class 8
- Women's singles – Class 5
- Men's singles – Class 10

Gold medalists
Sport	Event	Competitor(s)	NPC	Rec	Ref						
Athletics	Women's 200 metres T11	Terezinha Guilhermina; Guide Guilherme Soared de Santana	Brazil	PR							
Athletics	Women's javelin throw F12–13	Tanja Dragic	Serbia	WR							
Athletics	Women's shot put F35–36	Mariia Pomazan	Ukraine	WR							
Athletics	Women's long jump F42–44	Kelly Cartwright	Australia	WR							
Athletics	Men's 100 metres T36	Evgenii Shvetcov	Russia	PR							
Athletics	Women's 5000 metres T54	Edith Wolf	Switzerland								
Athletics	Women's 100 metres T37	Mandy François-Elie	France	RR							
Athletics	Men's 400 metres T53	Huzhao Li	China								
Athletics	Men's discus throw F42	Aled Davies	Great Britain								
Athletics	Men's 100 metres T52	Raymond Martin	United States								
Athletics	Men's javelin throw F44	Mingjie Gao	China	PR							
Athletics	Men's 200 metres T46	Yohansson Nascimento	Brazil	WR							
Athletics	Women's long jump F46	Nikol Rodomakina	Russia								
Athletics	Women's 100 metres T12	Guohua Zhou; Guide Jie Li	China								
Athletics	Men's 100 metres T54	Leo Pekka Tahti	Finland								
Athletics	Men's 400 metres T13	Alexey Labzin	Russia	PR							
Athletics	Men's discus throw F11	David Casino	Spain								
Athletics	Women's 100 metres T53	Lisha Huang	China								
Athletics	Men's 200 metres T44	Alan Fonteles Cardoso Oliveira	Brazil	RR							
Athletics	Women's 100 metres T44	Marie-Amelie le Fur	France								
Athletics	Men's 5000 metres T54	David Weir	Great Britain								
Cycling	Men's individual sprint B	Anthony Kappes	Great Britain								
Cycling	Women's individual pursuit B	Phillipa Gray	New Zealand								
Cycling	Mixed team sprint C1-5		China								
Equestrian	Individual Championship Test – Grade IV	Michele George on Rainman	Belgium								
Equestrian	Individual Championship Test – Grade III	Hannelore Brenner on Women of the World	Germany								
Equestrian	Individual Championship Test – Grade Ia	Sophie Christiansen on Janeiro 6	Great Britain								
Powerlifting	Women's 56 kg	Fatima Omar	Egypt								
Powerlifting	Men's 67.5 kg	Lei Liu	China								
Powerlifting	Women's 60 kg	Amalia Perez	Mexico	PR							
Rowing	Women's single sculls ASW1x	Alla Lysenko	Ukraine								
Rowing	Men's single sculls ASM1x	Cheng Huang	China								
Rowing	Mixed double sculls TAMix2x	Xiaoxian Lou; Tianming Fei	China								
Rowing	Mixed coxed four LTAMix4+		Great Britain			–	Shooting	Mixed R4 10 metre air rifle standing SH2	Juyoung Kang	South Korea	PR
Swimming	Men's 200 metre individual medley SM7	Yevheniy Bohodayko	Ukraine	WR							
Swimming	Women's 200 metre individual medley SM7	Jacqueline Freney	Australia	WR							
Swimming	Men's 200 metre freestyle S14	Jon Margeir Sverrisson	Iceland	WR							
Swimming	Women's 200 metre freestyle S14	Jessica-Jane Applegate	Great Britain	PR							
Swimming	Men's 100 metre backstroke S11	Dmytro Zalevskyy	Ukraine	EU							
Swimming	Women's 100 metre backstroke S11	Rina Akiyama	Japan	PR							
Swimming	Men's 100 metre freestyle S13	Ihar Boki	Belarus	WR							
Swimming	Women's 100 metre freestyle S13	Kelley Becherer	United States								
Swimming	Men's 100 metre butterfly S12	Roman Makarov	United States								
Swimming	Men's 150 metre individual medley SM4	Cameron Leslie	New Zealand	WR							
Swimming	Women's 50 metre freestyle S8	Mallory Weggemann	United States	PR							
Swimming	Men's 150 metre individual medley SM3	Roman Makarov	Russia	PR							
Swimming	Men's 4 × 100 metre freestyle relay 34pts		Australia	PR							
Swimming	Women's 100 metre butterfly S12	Joanna Mendak	Poland								
Table tennis	Women's singles – Class 11	Wong Ka Man	Hong Kong								
Table tennis	Men's singles – Class 3	Panfeng Feng	China								
Table tennis	Men's singles – Class 6	Rungroj Thainiyom	Thailand								
Table tennis	Women's singles – Class 1–2	Jing Liu	China								
Table tennis	Men's singles – Class 9	Ma Lin	China								
Table tennis	Men's singles – Class 5	Tommy Urhaug	Norway								
Table tennis	Men's singles – Class 7	Jochen Wollmert	Germany								
Table tennis	Women's singles – Class 4	Ying Zhou	China								
Table tennis	Women's singles – Class 8	Mao Jingdian	China								
Table tennis	Women's singles – Class 5	Bian Zhang	China								
Table tennis	Men's singles – Class 10	Patryk Chojnowski	Poland								

=== 3 September ===
Archery

- Men's individual recurve W1/W2
- Men's individual recurve Standing
- Men's individual compound W1
- Men's individual compound Open

Athletics

- Men's shot put F11–12
- Men's long jump F46
- Men's discus throw F35–36
- Men's 100 metres T53
- Men's 400 metres T52
- Women's 400 metres T54
- Women's shot put F42–44
- Women's 400 metres T13
- Women's long jump F20
- Women's javelin throw F33–34/52–53
- Men's 100 metres T51
- Men's 400 metres T38
- Men's high jump F42
- Men's 5000 metres T12
- Men's 1500 metres T11
- Men's 1500 metres T37

Equestrian

- Individual freestyle test – Grade II
- Individual freestyle test – Grade Ib

Powerlifting

- Women's 67.5 kg
- Women's 75 kg
- Men's 75 kg

Shooting

- Mixed P3 25 metre pistol SH1

Swimming

- Men's 200 metre individual medley SM6
- Women's 200 metre individual medley SM6
- Men's 100 metre freestyle S7
- Women's 100 metre freestyle S7
- Men's 100 metre freestyle S2
- Women's 100 metre freestyle S3
- Men's 100 metre breaststroke SB11
- Women's 100 metre breaststroke SB11
- Men's 200 metre individual medley SM12
- Women's 200 metre individual medley SM12
- Men's 100 metre backstroke S13
- Men's 50 metre freestyle S8
- Men's 50 metre breaststroke SB3
- Women's 4 × 100 metre freestyle relay 34pts

Table tennis

- Men's singles– Class 11
- Women's singles– Class 3
- Women's singles– Class 6
- Men's singles– Class 1
- Men's singles– Class 8
- Women's singles– Class 7
- Men's singles– Class 2
- Women's singles– Class 9
- Men's singles– Class 4
- Women's singles– Class 10

Gold medalists
Sport	Event	Competitor(s)	NPC	Rec	Ref					
Archery	Men's individual recurve W1/W2	Oscar de Pellegrin	Italy							
Archery	Men's individual recurve Standing	Timur Tuchinov	Russia							
Archery	Men's individual compound W1	Jeff Fabry	United States							
Archery	Men's individual compound Open	Jere Forsberg	Finland							
Athletics	Men's shot put F11–12	Andrii Holivets	Ukraine							
Athletics	Men's long jump F46	Fuliang Liu	China	RR						
Athletics	Men's discus throw F35–36	Sebastian Ernst Klaus Dietz	Germany							
Athletics	Men's 100 metres T53	Mickey Bushell	Great Britain	PR						
Athletics	Men's 400 metres T52	Raymond Martin	United States							
Athletics	Women's 400 metres T54	Tatyana McFadden	United States							
Athletics	Women's shot put F42–44	Juan Yao	China	WR						
Athletics	Women's 400 metres T13	Omara Durand	Cuba	PR						
Athletics	Women's long jump F20	Karolina Kucharczyk	Poland	WR						
Athletics	Women's javelin throw F33–34/52–53	Birgit Kober	Germany	WR						
Athletics	Men's 100 metres T51	Toni Piispanen	Finland	PR						
Athletics	Men's 400 metres T38	Mohamed Farhat Chida	Tunisia							
Athletics	Men's high jump F42	Iliesa Delana	Fiji	RR						
Athletics	Men's 5000 metres T12	El Amin Chentouf; Guide	Morocco	WR						
Athletics	Men's 1500 metres T11	Samwel Mushai Kimani; Guide James Boit	Kenya	WR						
Athletics	Men's 1500 metres T37	Michael McKillop	Ireland	PR						
Equestrian	Individual Freestyle Test – Grade II	Natasha Baker on Cabral	Great Britain							
Equestrian	Individual Freestyle Test – Grade Ib	Pepo Puch on Fine Feeling	Austria							
Powerlifting	Women's 67.5 kg	Souhad Ghazouani	France	PR						
Powerlifting	Women's 75 kg	Taoying Fu	China							
Powerlifting	Men's 75 kg	Ali Hosseini	Iran			–	Shooting	Mixed P3 25 metre pistol SH1	Jianfei Li	China
Swimming	Men's 200 metre individual medley SM6	Qing Zu	China	WR						
Swimming	Women's 200 metre individual medley SM6	Eleanor Simmonds	Great Britain	WR						
Swimming	Men's 100 metre freestyle S7	Shiyun Pan	China	AS						
Swimming	Women's 100 metre freestyle S7	Jacquline Freney	Australia	PR						
Swimming	Men's 100 metre freestyle S2	Yang Yang	China	WR						
Swimming	Women's 100 metre freestyle S3	Jiangbo Xia	China	WR						
Swimming	Men's 100 metre breaststroke SB11	Bozun Yang	China	WR						
Swimming	Women's 100 metre breaststroke SB11	Maja Reichard	Sweden	WR						
Swimming	Men's 200 metre individual medley SM12	Maksym Veraksa	Ukraine	PR						
Swimming	Women's 200 metre individual medley SM12	Oxana Savchenko	Russia	WR						
Swimming	Men's 100 metre backstroke S13	Ihar Boki	Belarus	WR						
Swimming	Men's 50 metre freestyle S8	Denis Tarasov	Russia	WR						
Swimming	Men's 50 metre breaststroke SB3	Michael Schoenmaker	Netherlands							
Swimming	Women's 4 × 100 metre freestyle relay 34pts		Australia	WR						
Table tennis	Men's singles– Class 11	Peter Palos	Hungary							
Table tennis	Women's singles– Class 3	Anna-Carin Ahlquist	Sweden							
Table tennis	Women's singles– Class 6	Raisa Chebanika	Russia							
Table tennis	Men's singles– Class 1	Holger Nikelis	Germany							
Table tennis	Men's singles– Class 8	Zhao Shuai	China							
Table tennis	Women's singles– Class 7	Kelly van Zon	Netherlands							
Table tennis	Men's singles– Class 2	Jan Riapos	Slovakia							
Table tennis	Women's singles– Class 9	Lina Lei	China							
Table tennis	Men's singles– Class 4	Young Gun Kim	South Korea							
Table tennis	Women's singles– Class 10	Natalia Partyka	Poland							

=== 4 September ===
Archery

- Women's individual recurve – W1/W2
- Women's individual recurve – Open
- Women's individual compound – Open

Athletics

- Men's shot put F57–58
- Men's javelin throw F52–53
- Men's long jump F11
- Men's 400 metres T46
- Women's shot put F37
- Men's 200 metres T34
- Men's 200 metres T11
- Women's discus throw F57–58
- Men's shot put F34
- Men's 1500 metres T13
- Men's long jump F20
- Men's 100 metres T12
- Men's 1500 metres T20
- Women's 1500 metres T12
- Men's 1500 metres T46
- Men's 400 metres T36
- Men's discus throw F40
- Women's 400 metres T12
- Men's 1500 metres T54
- Women's 4 × 100 metre relay T35/38

Boccia

- Mixed pairs BC4
- Mixed pairs BC3
- Mixed pairs BC1-2

Equestrian

- Individual Freestyle Test – Grade IV
- Individual Freestyle Test – Grade III
- Individual Freestyle Test – Grade Ia

Powerlifting

- Men's 82.5 kg
- Women's 82.5 kg
- Men's 90 kg

Shooting

- Men's R6 50 metre rifle 3 positions SH1

Swimming

- Men's 100 metre backstroke S8
- Women's 100 metre backstroke S8
- Men's 50 metre freestyle S6
- Women's 50 metre freestyle S6
- Men's 400 metre freestyle S9
- Women's 400 metre freestyle S9
- Men's 100 metre backstroke S10
- Women's 100 metre backstroke S10
- Men's 100 metre breaststroke SB4
- Women's 100 metre breaststroke SB4
- Men's 100 metre freestyle S12
- Women's 100 metre freestyle S12
- Men's 50 metre freestyle S7
- Women's 50 metre freestyle S7
- Men's 400 metre freestyle S13

Wheelchair fencing

- Men's individual foil – Category A
- Women's individual foil – Category A
- Women's individual foil – Category B
- Men's individual foil – Category B

Gold medalists
Sport	Event	Competitor(s)	NPC	Rec	Ref
Archery	Women's individual recurve – W1/W2	Zahra Nemati	Iran		
Archery	Women's individual recurve – Open	Huilian Yan	China		
Archery	Women's individual compound – Open	Danielle Brown	Great Britain		
Athletics	Men's shot put F57–58	Alexey Ashapatov	Russia	PR	
Athletics	Men's javelin throw F52–53	Alphanso Cunningham	Jamaica	RR	
Athletics	Men's long jump F11	Ruslan Katyshev	Ukraine		
Athletics	Men's 400 metres T46	Gunther Matzinger	Austria	RR	
Athletics	Women's shot put F37	Na Mi	China	WR	
Athletics	Men's 200 metres T34	Walid Ktila	Tunisia	WR	
Athletics	Men's 200 metres T11	Felipe Gomes; Guide Leonardo Souza Lopes	Brazil		
Athletics	Women's discus throw F57–58	Nassima Saifi	Algeria	PR	
Athletics	Men's shot put F34	Azeddine Nouiri	Morocco	WR	
Athletics	Men's 1500 metres T13	Abderrahim Zhiou	Tunisia	WR	
Athletics	Men's long jump F20	Jose Antonio Exposito Pineiro	Spain	PR	
Athletics	Men's 100 metres T12	Fedor Trikolich; Guide	Russia		
Athletics	Men's 1500 metres T20	Peyman Nasiri Bazanjani	Iran		
Athletics	Women's 1500 metres T12	Elena Pautova	Russia		
Athletics	Men's 1500 metres T46	Abrahan Tarbei	Kenya	WR	
Athletics	Men's 400 metres T36	Evgenii Shvetcov	Russia	WR	
Athletics	Men's discus throw F40	Zhiming Wang	China	WR	
Athletics	Women's 400 metres T12	Assia el Hannouni	France		
Athletics	Men's 1500 metres T54	David Weir	Great Britain		
Athletics	Women's 4 × 100 metre relay T35/38		Russia		
Boccia	Mixed pairs BC4		Brazil		
Boccia	Mixed pairs BC3		Greece		
Boccia	Mixed pairs BC1-2		Thailand		
Equestrian	Individual Freestyle Test – Grade IV	Michele George on Rainman	Belgium		
Equestrian	Individual Freestyle Test – Grade III	Hannelore Brenner on Women of the World	Germany		
Equestrian	Individual Freestyle Test – Grade Ia	Sophie Christiansen on Janeiro 6	Great Britain		
Powerlifting	Men's 82.5 kg	Majid Farzin	Iran		
Powerlifting	Women's 82.5 kg	Loveline Obiji	Nigeria		
Powerlifting	Men's 90 kg	Hany Abdelhady	Egypt	PR	
Shooting	Men's R6 50 metre rifle 3 positions SH1	Abdulla Sultan Alaryani	United Arab Emirates		
Swimming	Men's 100 metre backstroke S8	Konstantin Lisenkov	Russia	PR	
Swimming	Women's 100 metre backstroke S8	Heather Frederiksen	Great Britain		
Swimming	Men's 50 metre freestyle S6	Qing Zu	China	WR	
Swimming	Women's 50 metre freestyle S6	Mirjam de Koning-Peper	Netherlands	PR	
Swimming	Men's 400 metre freestyle S9	Brenden Hall	Australia	WR	
Swimming	Women's 400 metre freestyle S9	Natalie du Toit	South Africa		
Swimming	Men's 100 metre backstroke S10	Justin Zook	United States	WR	
Swimming	Women's 100 metre backstroke S10	Summer Ashley Mortimer	Canada	WR	
Swimming	Men's 100 metre breaststroke SB4	Daniel Dias	Brazil	WR	
Swimming	Women's 100 metre breaststroke SB4	Nataliia Prologaieva	Ukraine	WR	
Swimming	Men's 100 metre freestyle S12	Maksym Veraksa	Ukraine	PR	
Swimming	Women's 100 metre freestyle S12	Oxana Savchenko	Russia	WR	
Swimming	Men's 50 metre freestyle S7	Lantz Lamback	United States	PR	
Swimming	Women's 50 metre freestyle S7	Jacqueline Freney	Australia	WR	
Swimming	Men's 400 metre freestyle S13	Ihar Boki	Belarus	WR	
Wheelchair fencing	Men's individual foil – Category A	Ruyi Ye	China		
Wheelchair fencing	Women's individual foil – Category A	Yee Yu Chui	Hong Kong		
Wheelchair fencing	Women's individual foil – Category B	Fang Yao	China		
Wheelchair fencing	Men's individual foil – Category B	Daoliang Hu	China		

=== 5 September ===
Archery

- Men's team recurve – Open
- Women's team recurve – Open

Athletics

- Women's shot put F11–12 ·
- Men's discus throw F54–56
- Men's shot put F32–33
- Men's long jump F36 ·
- Women's 200 metres T37
- Men's shot put F37–38
- Men's 4 × 100 metres relay#T11–T13
- Women's javelin throw F54–56
- Men's long jump F37–38
- Men's javelin throw F12–13
- Men's 800 metres T12
- Men's 800 metres#T53
- Women's shot put F20 ·
- Women's 800 metres T53
- Women's 1500 metres T20
- Women's 100 metres T11
- Women's 100 metres T42
- Women's 100 metres T46
- Women's 100 metres T52
- Women's 800 metres T54
- Men's 4 × 100 metres relay T42–46

Cycling

- Men's individual time trial C5
- Men's individual time trial C4
- Men's individual time trial C3
- Men's individual time trial C2
- Men's individual time trial C1
- Women's individual time trial C5
- Women's individual time trial C4
- Women's individual time trial C1-3
- Men's individual time trial B
- Women's individual time trial B
- Men's individual time trial H4
- Men's individual time trial H3
- Men's individual time trial H2
- Men's individual time trial H1
- Women's individual time trial H4
- Women's individual time trial H3
- Women's individual time trial H1-2
- Mixed road time trial T1-2

Powerlifting

- Men's 100 kg
- Women's +82.5 kg
- Men's +100 kg

Shooting

- Men's R7 50 metre rifle 3 positions SH1

Swimming

- Men's 200 metre individual medley SM8
- Women's 200 metre individual medley SM8
- Men's 400 metre freestyle S10
- Women's 400 metre freestyle S10
- Men's 100 metre breaststroke SB5
- Women's 100 metre breaststroke SB5
- Men's 100 metre backstroke S12
- Women's 100 metre backstroke S12
- Men's 100 metre breaststroke SB6
- Women's 100 metre breaststroke SB6
- Men's 50 metre backstroke S2
- Men's 50 metre freestyle S9
- Women's 50 metre freestyle S9
- Men's 100 metre freestyle S4
- Women's 50 metre backstroke S2

Wheelchair fencing

- Men's individual épée A
- Women's individual épée A
- Men's individual épée B
- Women's individual épée B

Wheelchair tennis

- Quad Doubles

Gold medalists
Sport	Event	Competitor(s)	NPC	Rec	Ref						
Archery	Men's team recurve – Open		South Korea								
Archery	Women's team recurve – Open		Russia								
Athletics	Women's shot put F11–12	Assunta Legnante	Italy	WR							
Athletics	Men's discus throw F54–56	Leonardo Diaz	Cuba	WR							
Athletics	Men's shot put F32–33	Kamel Kardjena	Algeria	PR							
Athletics	Men's long jump F36	Roman Pavlyk	Ukraine								
Athletics	Women's 200 metres T37	Johanna Benson	Namibia	RR							
Athletics	Men's shot put F37–38	Dong Xia	China	WR							
Athletics	Men's 4 × 100 metres relay#T11–T13		Russia	PR							
Athletics	Women's javelin throw F54–56	Liwan Yang	China	WR							
Athletics	Men's long jump F37–38	Gocha Khugaev	Russia	WR							
Athletics	Men's javelin throw F12–13	Pengkai Zhu	China	WR							
Athletics	Men's 800 metres T12	Abderrahim Zhiou; Guide	Tunisia								
Athletics	Men's 800 metres T53	Richard Colman	Australia								
Athletics	Women's shot put F20	Ewa Durska	Poland	PR							
Athletics	Women's 800 metres T53	Hongzhuan Zhou	China	PR							
Athletics	Women's 1500 metres T20	Barbara Niewiedzial	Poland								
Athletics	Women's 100 metres T11	Terezinha Guilhermina; Guide Guilherme Soares de Santana	Brazil	WR							
Athletics	Women's 100 metres T42	Martina Caironi	Italy	WR							
Athletics	Women's 100 metres T46	Yunidis Castillo	Cuba								
Athletics	Women's 100 metres T52	Marieke Vervoort	Belgium	PR							
Athletics	Women's 800 metres T54	Tatyana McFadden	United States								
Athletics	Men's 4 × 100 metres relay T42–46		South Africa								
Cycling	Men's individual time trial C5	Yegor Dementyev	Ukraine								
Cycling	Men's individual time trial C4	Jiří Ježek	Czech Republic								
Cycling	Men's individual time trial C3	David Nicholas	Australia								
Cycling	Men's individual time trial C2	Tobias Graf	Germany								
Cycling	Men's individual time trial C1	Michael Teuber	Germany								
Cycling	Women's individual time trial C5	Sarah Storey	Great Britain								
Cycling	Women's individual time trial C4	Megan Fisher	United States								
Cycling	Women's individual time trial C1-3	Allison Jones	United States								
Cycling	Men's individual time trial B	Christian Venge; Pilot D Llauredo Caldero	Spain								
Cycling	Women's individual time trial B	Kathrin Goeken; Pilot K van Dijk	Netherlands								
Cycling	Men's individual time trial H4	Alessandro Zanardi	Italy								
Cycling	Men's individual time trial H3	Rafal Wilk	Poland								
Cycling	Men's individual time trial H2	Heinz Frei	Switzerland								
Cycling	Men's individual time trial H1	Mark Rohan	Ireland								
Cycling	Women's individual time trial H4	Andrea Eskau	Germany								
Cycling	Women's individual time trial H3	Sandra Graf	Switzerland								
Cycling	Women's individual time trial H1-2	Marianna Davis	United States								
Cycling	Mixed road time trial T1-2	Carol Cook	Australia								
Powerlifting	Men's 100 kg	Mohamed Eldib	Egypt	WR							
Powerlifting	Women's +82.5 kg	Grace Anozie	Nigeria								
Powerlifting	Men's +100 kg	Siamand Rahman	Iran	PR		–	Shooting	Men's R7 50 metre rifle 3 positions SH1	Jonas Jacobsson	Sweden	WR
Swimming	Men's 200 metre individual medley SM8	Oliver Hynd	Great Britain	EU							
Swimming	Women's 200 metre individual medley SM8	Jessica Long	United States	PR							
Swimming	Men's 400 metre freestyle S10	Ian Jaryd Silverman	United States	PR							
Swimming	Women's 400 metre freestyle S10	Elodie Lorandi	France								
Swimming	Men's 100 metre breaststroke SB5	Woo-Geun Lim	South Korea	AS							
Swimming	Women's 100 metre breaststroke SB5	Kirsten Bruhn	Germany								
Swimming	Men's 100 metre backstroke S12	Aleksandr Nevolin-Svetov	Russia	WR							
Swimming	Women's 100 metre backstroke S12	Oxana Savchenko	Russia	WR							
Swimming	Men's 100 metre breaststroke SB6	Yevheniy Bohodayko	Ukraine	WR							
Swimming	Men's 100 metre breaststroke SB6	Viktoriia Savtsova	Ukraine	PR							
Swimming	Men's 50 metre backstroke S2	Yang Yang	China	WR							
Swimming	Men's 50 metre freestyle S9	Matthew Cowdrey	Australia	WR							
Swimming	Women's 50 metre freestyle S9	Ping Lin	China	PR							
Swimming	Men's 100 metre freestyle S4	Gustavo Sanchez Martinez	Mexico	AM							
Swimming	Women's 50 metre backstroke S2	Yazhu Feng	China	WR							
Wheelchair fencing	Men's individual épée A	Dariusz Pender	Poland								
Wheelchair fencing	Women's individual épée A	Yee Yu Chui	Hong Kong								
Wheelchair fencing	Men's individual épée B	Saysunee Jana	Thailand								
Wheelchair fencing	Women's individual épée B	Jovane Silva Guissone	Brazil			–	Wheelchair tennis	Quad Doubles	Nicholas Taylor; David Wagner	United States	

=== 6 September ===
Athletics at the 2012 Summer Paralympics

- Men's discus throw F51–53
- Men's triple jump F11
- Women's 200 metres T38
- Men's shot put F40
- Women's discus throw F37
- Women's 200 metres T34
- Men's 100 metres T46
- Women's 200 metres T12
- Men's 400 metres T12
- Women's shot put F32–34
- Women's javelin throw F57–58
- Men's 200 metres T36
- Men's 800 metres T36
- Women's 100 metres T13
- Men's 200 metres T35
- Women's 200 metres T43–44
- Men's shot put F46
- Men's discus throw F44
- Women's 200 metres T53
- Men's 800 metres T54
- Men's 100 metres T44

Cycling

- Men's individual road race C4-5
- Women's individual road race C1-3
- Men's individual road race C1-3
- Women's individual road race C4-5

Sailing

- Three-person keelboat – Sonar – canceled
- Two-person keelboat – SKUD18 – canceled
- Single-person keelboat – 2.4mR – canceled

Shooting

- Women's R8 50 metre rifle 3 positions SH1
- Mixed P4 50 metre pistol SH1

Swimming

- Men's 200 metre individual medley SM9
- Women's 200 metre individual medley SM9
- Men's 400 metre freestyle S7
- Women's 400 metre freestyle S7
- Men's 100 metre breaststroke SB14
- Women's 100 metre breaststroke SB14
- Men's 50 metre backstroke S4
- Women's 50 metre backstroke S4
- Men's 100 metre freestyle S8
- Women's 100 metre freestyle S8
- Men's 50 metre backstroke S5
- Men's 100 metre freestyle S10
- Women's 100 metre freestyle S10
- Men's 100 metre butterfly S11
- Men's 50 metre backstroke S1

Wheelchair fencing

- Men's individual sabre A
- Men's individual sabre B

Gold medalists
Sport	Event	Competitor(s)	NPC	Rec	Ref
Athletics	Men's discus throw F51–53	Mohamed Berrahal	Algeria	WR	
Athletics	Men's triple jump F11	Denis Gulin	Russia		
Athletics	Women's 200 metres T38	Junfei Chen	China	WR	
Athletics	Men's shot put F40	Zhiming Wang	China	WR	
Athletics	Women's discus throw F37	Na Mi	China	WR	
Athletics	Women's 200 metres T34	Hannah Cockroft	Great Britain	PR	
Athletics	Men's 100 metres T46	Xu Zhao	China	RR	
Athletics	Women's 200 metres T12	Assia el Hannouni; Guide Gautier Simounet	France	WR	
Athletics	Men's 400 metres T12	Mahmoud Khaldi	Tunisia	WR	
Athletics	Women's shot put F32–34	Birgit Kober	Germany	WR	
Athletics	Women's javelin throw F57–58	Ming Liu	China	RR	
Athletics	Men's 200 metres T36	Roman Pavlyk	Ukraine	RR	
Athletics	Men's 800 metres T36	Evgenii Shvetcov	Russia	PR	
Athletics	Women's 100 metres T13	Omara Durand	Cuba	PR	
Athletics	Men's 200 metres T35	Iurii Tsaruk	Ukraine	WR	
Athletics	Women's 200 metres T43–44	Marlou van Rhijn	Netherlands	WR	
Athletics	Men's shot put F46	Nikita Prokhorov	Russia	WR	
Athletics	Men's discus throw F44	Jeremy Campbell	United States	PR	
Athletics	Women's 200 metres T53	Lisha Huang	China		
Athletics	Men's 800 metres T54	David Weir	Great Britain		
Athletics	Men's 100 metres T44	Jonnie Peacock	Great Britain	PR	
Cycling	Men's individual road race C4-5	Yegor Dementyev	Ukraine		
Cycling	Women's individual road race C1-3	Sini Zeng	China		
Cycling	Men's individual road race C1-3	Roberto Bargna	Italy		
Cycling	Women's individual road race C4-5	Sarah Storey	Great Britain		
Shooting	Women's R8 50 metre rifle 3 positions SH1	Cuiping Zhang	China		
Shooting	Mixed P4 50 metre pistol SH1	Seakyun Park	South Korea		
Swimming	Men's 200 metre individual medley SM9	Matthew Cowdrey	Australia		
Swimming	Women's 200 metre individual medley SM9	Natalie du Toit	South Africa		
Swimming	Men's 400 metre freestyle S7	Josef Craig	Great Britain	WR	
Swimming	Women's 400 metre freestyle S7	Jacqueline Freney	Australia	WR	
Swimming	Men's 100 metre breaststroke SB14	Yasuhiro Tanaka	Japan	WR	
Swimming	Women's 100 metre breaststroke SB14	Michelle Alonso Morales	Spain	WR	
Swimming	Men's 50 metre backstroke S4	Juan Reyes	Mexico		
Swimming	Women's 50 metre backstroke S4	Lisette Teunissen	Netherlands		
Swimming	Men's 100 metre freestyle S8	Yinan Wang	China	WR	
Swimming	Women's 100 metre freestyle S8	Jessica Long	United States	WR	
Swimming	Men's 50 metre backstroke S5	Daniel Dias	Brazil	WR	
Swimming	Men's 100 metre freestyle S10	Andre Brasil	Brazil	PR	
Swimming	Women's 100 metre freestyle S10	Sophie Pascoe	Australia	PR	
Swimming	Men's 100 metre butterfly S11	Viktor Smyrnov	Ukraine		
Swimming	Men's 50 metre backstroke S1	Hennadii Boiko	Ukraine	WR	
Wheelchair fencing	Men's individual sabre A	Yijun Chen	China		
Wheelchair fencing	Men's individual sabre B	Grzegorz Pluta	Poland		

=== 7 September ===
Athletics

- Women's discus throw F51–53
- Men's javelin throw F40
- Men's 100 metres T42
- Women's long jump F11–12
- Men's javelin throw F42
- Men's 200 metres T53
- Men's discus throw F32–34
- Men's shot put F20
- Men's discus throw F37–38
- Men's 200 metres T13
- Women's 100 metres T35
- Women's long jump F13
- Men's 5000 metres T11
- Men's 800 metres T52
- Men's 400 metres T54
- Women's 1500 metres T54 ·
- Men's 400 metres T11

Cycling

- Women's individual road race H1-3
- Men's individual road race H1 ·
- Men's individual road race H3 ·
- Women's individual road race H4
- Men's individual road race H4 ·
- Men's individual road race H2 ·

Goalball

- Women's
- Men's

Sitting volleyball

- Women's

Swimming

- Men's 100 metre freestyle S9
- Women's 100 metre freestyle S9
- Men's 400 metre freestyle S11
- Women's 400 metre freestyle S11
- Men's 50 metre butterfly S6
- Women's 50 metre butterfly S6
- Men's 50 metre freestyle S2
- Women's 50 metre freestyle S3
- Men's 50 metre butterfly S5
- Women's 50 metre butterfly S5
- Men's 50 metre freestyle S12
- Women's 50 metre freestyle S12
- Men's 200 metre individual medley SM13
- Women's 200 metre individual medley SM13
- Women's 4 × 100 metre medley relay 34pts

Table tennis

- Men's team – Class 1–2
- Men's team – Class 3
- Men's team – Class 6–8
- Women's team – Class 1–3

Wheelchair basketball

- Women's tournament

Wheelchair fencing

- Women's team – Open

Wheelchair tennis

- Men's doubles
- Women's singles

Gold medalists
Sport	Event	Competitor(s)	NPC	Rec	Ref				
Athletics	Women's discus throw F51–53	Josie Pearson	Great Britain	WR					
Athletics	Men's javelin throw F40	Zhiming Wang	China	WR					
Athletics	Men's 100 metres T42	Heinrich Popow	Germany	RR					
Athletics	Women's long jump F11–12	Oksana Zubkovska	Ukraine	WR					
Athletics	Men's javelin throw F42	Yanlong Fu	China	WR					
Athletics	Men's 200 metres T53	Huzhao Li	China	PR					
Athletics	Men's discus throw F32–34	Yanzhang Wang	China	WR					
Athletics	Men's shot put F20	Todd Hodgetts	Australia	WR					
Athletics	Men's discus throw F37–38	Javad Hardani	Iran	WR					
Athletics	Men's 200 metres T13	Jason Smyth	Ireland	WR					
Athletics	Women's 100 metres T35	Liu Ping	China	WR					
Athletics	Women's long jump F13	Ilse Hayes	South Africa						
Athletics	Men's 5000 metres T11	Cristian Valenzuela; Guide Cristopher Guajardo	Chile						
Athletics	Men's 800 metres T52	Raymond Martin	United States						
Athletics	Men's 400 metres T54	Lixin Zhang	China						
Athletics	Women's 1500 metres T54	Tatyana McFadden	United States						
Athletics	Men's 400 metres T11	Jose Sayovo Armando; Guide Nicolau Palanca	Angola						
Cycling	Women's individual road race H1-3	Marianna Davis	United States						
Cycling	Men's individual road race H1	Mark Rohan	Ireland						
Cycling	Men's individual road race H3	Rafal Wilk	Poland						
Cycling	Women's individual road race H4	Andrea Eskau	Germany						
Cycling	Men's individual road race H4	Alessandro Zanardi	Italy						
Cycling	Men's individual road race H2	Walter Ablinger	Austria						
Goalball	Women's		Japan						
Goalball	Men's		Finland			–	Sitting volleyball	Women's	China
Swimming	Men's 100 metre freestyle S9	Matthew Cowdrey	Australia						
Swimming	Women's 100 metre freestyle S9	Ellie Cole	Australia	OC					
Swimming	Men's 400 metre freestyle S11	Bradley Snyder	United States						
Swimming	Women's 400 metre freestyle S11	Daniela Schulte	Germany						
Swimming	Men's 50 metre butterfly S6	Qing Xu	China	WR					
Swimming	Women's 50 metre butterfly S6	Oksana Khrul	Ukraine	WR					
Swimming	Men's 50 metre freestyle S2	Yang Yang	China						
Swimming	Women's 50 metre freestyle S3	Jiangbo Xia	China	WR					
Swimming	Men's 50 metre butterfly S5	Daniel Dias	Brazil	WR					
Swimming	Women's 50 metre butterfly S5	Sarah Louise Rung	Norway						
Swimming	Men's 50 metre freestyle S12	Maksym Veraksa	Ukraine						
Swimming	Women's 50 metre freestyle S12	Oxana Savchenko	Russia	WR					
Swimming	Men's 200 metre individual medley SM13	Ihar Boki	Belarus	WR					
Swimming	Women's 200 metre individual medley SM13	Valerie Grand-Maison	Canada	WR					
Swimming	Women's 4 × 100 metre medley relay 34pts	Ellie Cole; Katherine Downie; Annabelle Williams; Jacqueline Freney	Australia	OC					
Table tennis	Men's team – Class 1–2		Slovakia						
Table tennis	Men's team – Class 3		China						
Table tennis	Men's team – Class 6–8		Poland						
Table tennis	Women's team – Class 1–3		China						
Wheelchair basketball	Women's tournament		Germany						
Wheelchair fencing	Women's team – Open		China						
Wheelchair tennis	Men's doubles	Stefan Olsson; Peter Vikstrom	Sweden						
Wheelchair tennis	Women's singles	Esther Vergeer	Netherlands						

=== 8 September ===
Athletics

- Men's 100 metres T37
- Women's shot put F57–58
- Men's triple jump F12
- Men's javelin throw F54–56
- Women's 100 metres T36
- Women's javelin throw F37–38
- Men's 200 metres T52
- Men's 100 metres T34
- Men's 200 metres T38
- Women's 100 metres T54
- Women's 400 metres T37
- Men's 800 metres T13
- Men's 100 metres T11
- Men's 4 × 400 metres relay T53–T54 ·
- Men's javelin throw F57–58
- Men's high jump F46
- Men's shot put F40
- Women's 400 metres T46
- Men's 200 metres T12 ·
- Men's 800 metres T46
- Women's 400 metres T53
- Men's 400 metres T44

Boccia

- Mixed Individual BC1
- Mixed Individual BC3
- Mixed Individual BC4
- Mixed Individual BC2

Cycling

- Women's individual road race B
- Mixed road race T1-2
- Men's individual road race B
- Mixed road team relay H1-4

Football 5-a-side

- Men's

Sitting volleyball

- Men's

Swimming

Table tennis

- Women's team – Class 4–5
- Men's team – Class 4–5
- Women's team – Class 6–10
- Men's team – Class 9–10

Wheelchair basketball

- Men's tournament

Wheelchair fencing

- Men's team – Open

Wheelchair tennis

- Men's singles
- Quad singles
- Women's doubles

Gold medalists
Sport	Event	Competitor(s)	NPC	Rec	Ref
Athletics	Men's 100 metres T37	Fanie van der Merwe	South Africa	WR	
Athletics	Women's shot put F57–58	María de los Ángeles Ortíz	Mexico	WR	
Athletics	Men's triple jump F12	Oleg Panyutin	Azerbaijan		
Athletics	Men's javelin throw F54–56	Luis Alberto Zepeda Félix	Mexico	RR	
Athletics	Women's 100 metres T36	Elena Ivanova	Russia		
Athletics	Women's javelin throw F37–38	Shirlene Coelho	Brazil	WR	
Athletics	Men's 200 metres T52	Raymond Martin	United States	PR	
Athletics	Men's 100 metres T34	Walid Ktila	Tunisia	PR	
Athletics	Men's 200 metres T38	Evan O'Hanlon	Australia	WR	
Athletics	Women's 100 metres T54	Liu Wenjun	China	WR	
Athletics	Women's 400 metres T37	Neda Bahi	Tunisia	RR	
Athletics	Men's 800 metres T13	Abdellatif Baka	Algeria	PR	
Athletics	Men's 100 metres T11	Lei Xue	China		
Athletics	Men's 4 × 400 metres relay T53–T54	Liu Yang; Liu Chengming; Li Huzhao; Zhang Lixin	China		
Athletics	Men's javelin throw F57–58	Mohammad Khalvandi	Iran		
Athletics	Men's high jump F46	Maciej Lepiato	Poland		
Athletics	Women's shot put F40	Raoua Tlili	Tunisia	WR	
Athletics	Women's 400 metres T46	Yunidis Castillo	Cuba		
Athletics	Men's 200 metres T12	Mateusz Michalski	Poland		
Athletics	Men's 800 metres T46	Gunther Matzinger	Austria		
Athletics	Women's 400 metres T53	Zhou Hongzhuan	China		
Athletics	Men's 400 metres T44	Oscar Pistorius	South Africa		
Boccia	Mixed Individual BC1	Pattaya Tadtong	Thailand		
Boccia	Mixed Individual BC3	Ye-Jin Choi	South Korea		
Boccia	Mixed Individual BC4	Dirceu Pinto	Brazil		
Boccia	Mixed Individual BC2	Maciel Sousa Santos	Brazil		
Cycling	Women's individual road race B	Robbi Weldon	Canada		
Cycling	Mixed road race T1-2	David Stone	Great Britain		
Cycling	Men's individual road race B	Ivano Pizzi	Italy		
Cycling	Mixed road team relay H1-4	Matthew Updike; Óscar Sánchez; Marianna Davis	United States		
Football 5-a-side	Men's		Brazil		
Sitting volleyball	Men's		Bosnia and Herzegovina		
Swimming					
Table tennis	Women's team – Class 4–5	Gu Gai; Zhang Bian; Zhang Miao; Zhou Ying	China		
Table tennis	Men's team – Class 4–5	Cao Ningning; Guo Xingyuan; Zhang Yan	China		
Table tennis	Women's team – Class 6–10	Fan Lei; Lei Lina; Liu Meili; Yang Qian	China		
Table tennis	Men's team – Class 9–10	Ma Lin; Lian Hao; Lu Xiaolei; Ge Yang	China		
Wheelchair basketball	Men's tournament		Canada		
Wheelchair fencing	Men's team - Open	Chen Yijun; Ye Ruyi; Hu Daoliang	China		
Wheelchair tennis	Men's singles	Shingo Kunieda	Japan		
Wheelchair tennis	Quad singles	Noam Gershony	Israel		
Wheelchair tennis	Women's doubles	Marjolein Buis; Esther Vergeer	Netherlands		

=== 9 September ===
Athletics

- Men's marathon T12
- Men's marathon T46
- Men's marathon T54
- Women's marathon T54

Football 7-a-side

- Men's

Wheelchair rugby

- Mixed

Closing ceremony

Gold medalists
Sport	Event	Competitor(s)	NPC	Rec	Ref
Athletics	Men's marathon T12	Alberto Suárez Laso	Spain		
Athletics	Men's marathon T46	Tito Sena	Brazil		
Athletics	Men's marathon T54	David Weir	Great Britain		
Athletics	Women's marathon T54	Shirley Reilly	United States		
Football 7-a-side	Men's		Russia		
Wheelchair rugby	Mixed		Australia		
