= Austria at the 2012 Summer Paralympics =

- IPC code: AUT
- NPC: Austrian Paralympic Committee
- Website: www.oepc.at (in German)

in London
- Competitors: 35 in 9 sports
- Flag bearer: Stanisław Frączyk
- Medals Ranked 30th: Gold 4 Silver 3 Bronze 6 Total 13

Summer Paralympics appearances (overview)
- 1960; 1964; 1968; 1972; 1976; 1980; 1984; 1988; 1992; 1996; 2000; 2004; 2008; 2012; 2016; 2020; 2024

Austria competed at the 2012 Summer Paralympics in London, United Kingdom from August 29 to September 9, 2012.

== Medalists ==
Medal	Name	Sport	Event	Date
Gold	Pepo Puch	Equestrian	Individual freestyle test grade Ib	3 September
Gold	Gunther Matzinger	Athletics	400m T46	4 September
Gold	Gunther Matzinger	Athletics	800m T46	8 September
Gold	Walter Ablinger	Cycling	Men's individual H2 Road Race	7 September
Silver	Doris Mader	Table Tennis	Singles Class 3	3 September
Silver	Stanisław Frączyk	Table Tennis	Singles Class 9	2 September
Bronze	Pepo Puch	Equestrian	Individual Championship Test – Grade 1b	1 September
Bronze	Natalija Eder	Athletics	Javelin Throw F12/13	2 September

Medals by sport
Sport	Gold medal	Silver medal	Bronze medal	Total
Athletics	1	0	3	4
Equestrian	1	0	1	2
Table Tennis	0	2	0	2
Total	2	2	4	8

== Athletics ==
Men

Track

Athlete	Events	Heat		Semifinal		Final	
Athlete	Events	Time	Rank	Time	Rank	Time	Rank
Thomas Geierspichler	100m T52	18.67	8	—N/a		19.01	7
Thomas Geierspichler	200m T52	34.02	11	—N/a		Did not advance	
Thomas Geierspichler	400m T52	1:05.72	6	—N/a		1:04.64	3rd place, bronze medalist(s)
Thomas Geierspichler	800m T52	—N/a				2:05.35	5
Günther Matzinger	400m T46	49.91	3	—N/a		48.45	1st place, gold medalist(s)
Günther Matzinger	800m T46	1:55.33	1	—N/a		1:51.82	1st place, gold medalist(s)
Robert Mayer	100m T44	12.61	19	—N/a		Did not advance	
Robert Mayer	200m T44	24.67	13	—N/a		Did not advance	

Field

Athlete	Events	Distance	Rank
Bil Marinkovic	Shot Put F11/12	12.21	8
Bil Marinkovic	Discus Throw F11	34.59	3rd place, bronze medalist(s)
Georg Tischler	Shot Put F54/55/56	8.69	14

Women

Field

Athlete	Events	Distance	Rank
Natalija Eder	Shot Put F11/12	9.96	13
Natalija Eder	Javelin Throw F12/13	38.03	3rd place, bronze medalist(s)

== Cycling ==
=== Road ===
Athlete	Event	Time	Rank
Walter Ablinger	Men's Individual H 2 Road Race	1:37.55	1st place, gold medalist(s)
Walter Ablinger	Men's Individual H 2 Time Trial	26:57.25	2nd place, silver medalist(s)
Wolfgang Eibeck	Men's Individual C4-5 Road Race	1:55.54	6
Wolfgang Eibeck	Men's Individual C5 Time Trial	33:43.81	6
Christoph Etzlstorfer	Men's Individual H1 Road Race	2:05.56	8
Christoph Etzlstorfer	Men's Individual H1 Time Trial	39:03.36	6
Manfred Gattringer	Men's Individual C4-5 Road Race	DNF	
Manfred Gattringer	Men's Individual C4-5 Time Trial	36:43.55	9
Anita Ruetz	Women's Individual C1-3 Road Race	DNF	
Anita Ruetz	Women's Individual C1-3 Time Trial	31:05.05	8
Wolfgang Schattauer	Men's Individual H1 Road Race	1:53.24	3rd place, bronze medalist(s)
Wolfgang Schattauer	Men's Individual H1 Time Trial	38:02.35	3rd place, bronze medalist(s)
Helmut Winterleitner	Men's T1-2 Road Race	50:04	6
Helmut Winterleitner	Men's T1-2 Time Trial	16:17.65	10
Walter Ablinger; Christoph Etzlstorfer; Wolfgang Schattauer	Mixed H 1-4 Team Relay	Lapped	

=== Track ===
Pursuit

Athlete	Event	Qualification		Final	
Athlete	Event	Time	Rank	Opposition Time	Rank
Wolfgang Eibeck	Men's Individual Pursuit C5	4:46.999	7	Did not advance	
Manfred Gattringer	Men's Individual Pursuit C4	5:12.278	11	Did not advance	
Anita Ruetz	Women's Individual Pursuit C1-2-3	5:05.697	10	Did not advance	

Time Trial

Athlete	Event	Time	Rank
Anita Ruetz	Women's C1-2-3 500m Time Trial	45.850	8

== Equestrian ==
Athlete	Horse	Event	Total	
Athlete	Horse	Event	Score	Rank
Thomas Haller	Hallers Dessino	Individual Championship Test – Grade II	65.143	16
Thomas Haller	Hallers Dessino	Individual Freestyle Test – Grade II	Retired	
Pepo Puch	Fine Feeling	Individual Championship Test – Grade 1b	75.043	3rd place, bronze medalist(s)
Pepo Puch	Fine Feeling	Individual Freestyle Test – Grade 1b	79.150	1st place, gold medalist(s)

== Sailing ==
Athlete	Event	Race											Total points	Rank
Athlete	Event	1	2	3	4	5	6	7	8	9	10	11	Total points	Rank
Kurt Badstöber; Edmund Rath; Sven Reiger	Sonar – Three Person Keelboat	13	12	12	13	8	(14)	13	11	13	12	DNS	105	13

== Shooting ==
Athlete	Event	Qualification		Final	
Athlete	Event	Score	Rank	Score	Rank
Hubert Aufschnaiter	Men's 10m Air Pistol SH1	559	12	Did not advance	
Hubert Aufschnaiter	Mixed 25m Air Pistol SH1	551	15	Did not advance	
Hubert Aufschnaiter	Mixed 50m Air Pistol SH1	494	25	Did not advance	

== Swimming ==
Men

Athlete	Events	Heats		Final	
Athlete	Events	Time	Rank	Time	Rank
Andreas Onea	100m Butterfly S8	01:09.43	16	Did not advance	
Andreas Onea	100m Breaststroke SB8	01:12.04	2	1:11.35	4
Andreas Onea	200m Individual Medley SM8	2:35.74	9	Did not advance	
Peter Tichy	50m Freestyle S12	28.78	18	Did not advance	
Peter Tichy	100m Freestyle S12	1:04.83	16	Did not advance	
Peter Tichy	100m Breaststroke SB12	1:26.69	16	Did not advance	
Peter Tichy	100m Backstroke S12	1:22.06	16	Did not advance	

Women

Athlete	Events	Heats		Final	
Athlete	Events	Time	Rank	Time	Rank
Sabine Weber-Treiber	50m Freestyle S6	39.84	16	Did not advance	
Sabine Weber-Treiber	100m Freestyle S6	1:32.37	18	Did not advance	
Sabine Weber-Treiber	100m Breaststroke SB6	1:56.99	5	1:51.96	4
Sabine Weber-Treiber	100m Backstroke S6	01:50.25	16	Did not advance	

== Wheelchair fencing ==
Athlete	Event	Qualification		Round of 16	Quarterfinal	Semifinal	Final / BM	
Athlete	Event	Opposition Score	Rank	Opposition Score	Opposition Score	Opposition Score	Opposition Score	Rank
Manfred Böhm	Men's Sabre B							

== Wheelchair tennis ==
Men

Athlete	Event	Round of 64	Round of 32	Round of 16	Quarterfinals	Semifinals	Final / BM	
Athlete	Event	Opposition Score	Opposition Score	Opposition Score	Opposition Score	Opposition Score	Opposition Score	Rank
Martin Legner	Singles	Oh Sang-ho (KOR); W 6–1, 6-1	David Philipson (GBR); L 3–6, 2-6	Did not advance				
Thomas Mossier	Singles	Robinson Mendez (CHI); W 3-6, 6–4, 6-2	Takashi Sanada (JPN); L 6–4, 3–6, 3–6	Did not advance				
Martin Legner; Thomas Mossier	Doubles	—N/a	Robinson Mendez (CHI) / Diego Pérez (CHI); W 6–3, 7–5	Frédéric Cattanéo (FRA) / Nicolas Peifer (FRA); L 0–6, 2–6	Did not advance			

Women

Athlete	Event	Round of 64	Round of 32	Round of 16	Quarterfinals	Semifinals	Final / BM	
Athlete	Event	Opposition Score	Opposition Score	Opposition Score	Opposition Score	Opposition Score	Opposition Score	Rank
Henriett Koósz	Singles	—N/a	Annick Sevenans (BEL); L 0–6, 1–6	Did not advance				

== Table Tennis ==
Men

Athlete	Event	Preliminaries			Quarterfinals	Semifinals	Finals	
Athlete	Event	Opposition Result	Opposition Result	Rank	Opposition Result	Opposition Result	Opposition Result	Rank
Andreas Vevera	Singles Class 1	Borgato (ITA); W 3-0	Davies (GBR); L 2-3	2	Did not advance			
Hans Ruep	Singles Class 2	Janfeshan (IRI); L 1-3	Kim (KOR); L 0-3	3	Did not advance			
Manfred Dollmann	Singles Class 3	Kesler (SRB); L 1-3	Knaf (BRA); L 0-3	3	Did not advance			
Egon Kramminger	Singles Class 3	Rodriguez (ESP); W 3-0	Bruechle (GER); L 0-3	2	Did not advance			
Stanisław Frączyk	Singles Class 9	Bye			Aulie (NOR); W 3-1	Last (NED); W 3-2	Ma (CHN); L 1-3	2nd place, silver medalist(s)
Hans Ruep; Andreas Vevera	Men's Team Class 1–2	—N/a			Italy (ITA); W 3-1	Slovakia (SVK); L 0-3	South Korea (KOR); L 0-3	4
Manfred Dollman; Egon Kramminger	Men's Team Class 3	—N/a			South Korea (KOR); L 0-3	Did not advance		5

Women

Athlete	Event	Preliminaries		Quarterfinals	Semifinals	Finals	
Athlete	Event	Opposition Result	Rank	Opposition Result	Opposition Result	Opposition Result	Rank
Doris Mader	Singles Class 3	Pattaravadee Wararitdamrongkul (THA); W 3-0; Fanny Bertrand (FRA); W 3-2	1	Li Qian (CHN); W 3-2	Sara Head (GBR); W 3-0	Anna-Carin Ahlquist (SWE); L 0-3	2nd place, silver medalist(s)
