= 2013 European Para-Dressage Championship =

- Host city: Herning, Denmark
- Date(s): 20–25 August
- Level: Senior
- Events: 11; Team, Individual Grades Ia, Ib, II, III and IV; Freestyle Grades Ia, Ib, II, III and IV

The 2013 European Para-Dressage Championship, known for sponsorship reasons as the JYSK FEI European Para-Dressage Championship, was held between August 19 and August 25, 2013 in Herning, Denmark. It formed part of the 2013 FEI European Championships; other disciplines included were Showjumping and Dressage.

== Competitions ==
=== General ===
Competition was held in eleven events; the team event involved four horse per nation, while individuals competed across ten graded individual freestyle competitions; the five individual classes, where marks also counted towards team medals, and the freestyle classes.

Competition was dominated by riders from Great Britain, historically the leading nation in the sport. Sophie Christiansen, Sophie Wells and Natasha Baker each won three gold medals on their way to taking team gold for Great Britain. Austria's Pepo Puch won two gold medals in the Grade III classifications.

== Medals ==
Event	Gold		Silver		Bronze	
Team Events
Team Dressage; Details	Great Britain (United Kingdom); Sophie Christiansen riding Janeiro; Anne Dunham riding Lucas Normank; Natasha Baker riding Cabral; Sophie Wells riding Valerius	453.585	Germany; Elke Phillipe riding Regaliz; Britta Napel riding Aqualina; Angelika Trabert riding Ariva Avanti; Hannelore Brenner riding Women of the World	429.066	Denmark; Stinna Tange Kaastrup riding Steffi Graf; Caroline Cecilie Nielsen riding Leon Eli; Line Thorning Jørgensen riding Di Caprio; Line Kongensgaard riding Laponio	422.031
Class Ia
Individual Class Ia Details	Sophie Christiansen (United Kingdom) riding Janeiro	76.609%	Anne Dunham (United Kingdom) riding Lucas Normank	75.174%	Sara Morganti (Italy) riding Royal Delight	74.478%
Freestyle Class Ia Details	Sophie Christiansen (United Kingdom) riding Janeiro	78.100%	Anne Dunham (United Kingdom) riding Lucas Normank	77.350%	Sara Morganti (Italy) riding Royal Delight	76.100%
Class Ib
Individual Class Ib	Pepo Puch (Austria) riding Fine Feeling S	76.138%	Ricky Balshaw (United Kingdom) riding Enggaards Solitaire	73.586%	Stinna Tange Kaastrup (Denmark) riding Steffi Graf	71.862%
Freestyle Class Ib	Pepo Puch (Austria) riding Fine Feeling S	79.200%	Ricky Balshaw (United Kingdom) riding Enggaards Solitaire	76.800%	Stinna Tange Kaastrup (Denmark) riding Steffi Graf	71.250%
Class II
Individual Class II	Natasha Baker (United Kingdom) riding Cabral	72.114%	Angelika Trabert (Germany) riding Ariva Avanti	71.571%	Britta Näpel (Germany) riding Aquilina	71.286%
Freestyle Class II	Natasha Baker (United Kingdom) riding Cabral	77.650%	Angelika Trabert (Germany) riding Ariva Avanti	74.200%	Britta Näpel (Germany) riding Aquilina	73.350%
Class III
Individual Class III	Hannelore Brenner (Germany) riding Women of the World	72.610%	Sanne Voets (Netherlands) riding Vedet	71.927%	José Letartre (France) riding Warina	69.683%
Freestyle Class III	Sanne Voets (Netherlands) riding Vedet	76.500%	Hannelore Brenner (Germany) riding Women of the World	75.700%	José Letartre (France) riding Warina	72.850%
Class IV
Individual Class IV	Sophie Wells (United Kingdom) riding Valerius	75.643%	Frank Hosmar (Netherlands) riding Alphaville	71.810%	Line Kongensgaard (Denmark) riding Lapanio	70.024%
Freestyle Class IV	Sophie Wells (United Kingdom) riding Valerius	80.250%	Frank Hosmar (Netherlands) riding Alphaville	76.900%	Line Thorning Jørgensen (Denmark) riding di Caprio	72.950%

=== Medal table ===
Place	Nation	1st place, gold medalist(s)	2nd place, silver medalist(s)	3rd place, bronze medalist(s)	Total
1	Great Britain	7	4	0	11
2	Austria	2	0	0	2
3	Germany	1	4	2	7
4	Netherlands	1	3	0	4
5	Denmark	0	0	5	5
6	Italy	0	0	2	2
Total		11	11	11	33
