= Balshaw =

Balshaw is a surname. Notable people with the surname include:

- Iain Balshaw (born 1979), English rugby union player
- Maria Balshaw (born 1970), English academic and museum director
- Ricky Balshaw (born 1986), British para equestrian rider
