= Angelika Trabert =

German doctor and para-equestrian rider

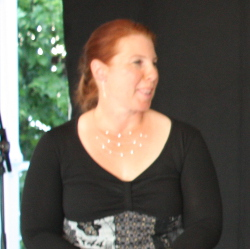
- Trabert in 2011

Personal information
- National team: Germany
- Born: October 9, 1967 (age 58) Frankfurt, West Germany
- Home town: Dreieich, Germany
- Education: University of Marburg
- Occupation: Doctor
- Website: Angelika-Trabert.de

Sport
- Country: Germany
- Sport: Para equestrian
- Disability: Dysmelia
- Disability class: Grade II
Medal record
Para-equestrian
Representing Germany
Paralympic Games
Silver medal – second place	1996 Atlanta	Dressage grade II
Silver medal – second place	1996 Atlanta	Kur trot grade II
Silver medal – second place	2008 Beijing	Overall team
Silver medal – second place	2012 London	Team
Bronze medal – third place	2012 London	Individual grade II
Bronze medal – third place	2012 London	Freestyle grade II
FEI World Equestrian Games
Gold medal – first place	2010 Lexington	Freestyle grade II
Silver medal – second place	2010 Lexington	Team dressage
European Para-Dressage Championship
Gold medal – first place	2009 Kristiansand	Freestyle grade II
Silver medal – second place	2002 Anadia	Team dressage
Silver medal – second place	2005 Sóskút	Team dressage
Silver medal – second place	2009 Kristiansand	Team dressage
Silver medal – second place	2009 Kristiansand	Individual grade II
Silver medal – second place	2013 Herning	Team dressage
Silver medal – second place	2013 Herning	Individual grade II
Silver medal – second place	2013 Herning	Freestyle grade II
Bronze medal – third place	2011 Moorsele	Team dressage
- Updated on 11 November 2017

Dr. Angelika Trabert (born 9 October 1967), is a German doctor and para-equestrian rider. She made her international debut in 1991, and went on to compete at five consecutive Summer Paralympics for her country, winning silver and bronze multiple medals. In addition, she was the 2009 European Champion in freestyle. Outside of the sport, she is an Anaesthetist who has worked internationally, including providing medical care in rural Africa.

== Career ==
Angelika Trabert was born on 9 October 1967 in Frankfurt, West Germany. She has dysmelia, a congenital disability which means that she was born without legs, and with only three fingers on her right hand. At the age of six, she began to ride horses and went on to compete internationally for Germany from 1991 onwards, in the Paralympic classification of grade II.

Her first individual victory came at the 2009 European Para-Dressage Championship in Kristiansand, Norway, in the freestyle competition. She also won gold in the freestyle grade II on her horse Ariva-Avanti at the 2010 FEI World Equestrian Games in Lexington, Kentucky with a score of 75.900. She has also competed at five Summer Paralympic Games from the 1996 Games in Atlanta, Georgia, onwards. Across three separate Games, she has won three silver medals and a bronze. In 2018, the National Cowgirl Museum and Hall of Fame inducted her.

In addition to her equestrian career, Trabert works as an Anaesthetist, a job she takes leave from in order to compete in Para-equestrian. This role has led to her not only working in Germany as a doctor, but also travelling to Africa to provide medical care in rural communities.
