= Cycling at the 2012 Summer Paralympics – Men's individual pursuit C1 =

Cycling, Men's Ind. Pursuit C1 at the XIV Paralympic Games
- Venue: ExCeL Exhibition Centre
- Dates: 31 August
- Competitors: 9 from 7 nations

Medalists
1st place, gold medalist(s)		Mark Lee Colbourne	Great Britain
2nd place, silver medalist(s)		Li Zhang Yu	China
3rd place, bronze medalist(s)		Rodrigo Fernando Lopez	Argentina

The Men's Individual Pursuit C1 track cycling event at the 2012 Summer Paralympics took place on 31 August at London Velopark. The race distance was 3 km.

== Preliminaries ==
Q = Qualifier WR = World Record

Rank	Name	Country	Time
1	Mark Lee Colbourne	Great Britain	3:53.970 Q WR
2	Li Zhang Yu	China	4:00.235 Q
3	Michael Teuber	Germany	4:04.700 Q
4	Rodrigo Fernando Lopez	Argentina	4:07.725 Q
5	Juan Jose Mendez	Spain	4:15.653
6	Erich Winkler	Germany	4:18.481
7	Jaye Milley	Canada	4:24.673
8	Anthony Zahn	United States	4:38.466
-	Brayden McDougall	Canada	DSQ

== Finals ==
Gold medal match

Name	Time	Rank
Mark Lee Colbourne (GBR)	3:53.881 WR	1st place, gold medalist(s)
Li Zhang Yu (CHN)	4:01.826	2nd place, silver medalist(s)

Bronze medal match

Name	Time	Rank
Rodrigo Fernando Lopez (ARG)	4:04.559	3rd place, bronze medalist(s)
Michael Teuber (GER)	4:10.965	4
