= 2011 European Para-Dressage Championship =

- Host city: Moorsele, Belgium
- Date(s): 1–4 September
- Level: Senior
- Events: 11; Team, Individual Grades Ia, Ib, II, III and IV; Freestyle Grades Ia, Ib, II, III and IV

The 2011 European Para-Dressage Championship was held between September 1 to 4, 2011 in Moorsele, Belgium

== Competitions ==
=== General ===
Competition was held in eleven events; the team event involved four horse per nation, while individuals competed across ten graded individual freestyle competitions; the five individual classes, where marks also counted towards team medals, and the freestyle classes.

Competition was dominated by riders from Great Britain, historically the leading nation in the sport. Anne Dunham, Sophie Wells and Natasha Baker each won three gold medals on their way to taking team gold for Great Britain.

== Medals ==
Event	Gold		Silver		Bronze	
Team Events
Team Dressage	Great Britain (United Kingdom); Emma Sheardon riding Purdy's Dream; Anne Dunham riding Teddy; Deborah Criddle riding Ljt Akilles; Sophie Wells riding Valerius	444.262	Denmark; Stinna Kaastrup riding Labbenhus Snovs; Caroline Cecile Nielsen riding Leon; Henrik Weber Sibbesen riding Rexton Royal; Line Thorning Jorgensen riding Di Caprio	430.618	Germany; Lena Weifen riding Don Turner; Britta Napel riding Aqualina; Angelika Trabert riding Ariva Avanti; Hannelore Brenner riding Women of the World	429.730
Class Ia
Individual Class Ia	Anne Dunham (United Kingdom) riding Teddy	75.950%	Emma Sheeardown (United Kingdom) riding Purdy's Dream	73.400%	Helen Kearney (Republic of Ireland) riding Mister Cool	73.100%
Freestyle Class Ia	Anne Dunham (United Kingdom) riding Teddy	79.200%	Emma Sheeardown (United Kingdom) riding Purdy's Dream	74.100%	Anita Johnsson (Sweden) riding Donar	73.950%
Class Ib
Individual Class Ib	Pepo Puch (Austria) riding Good Boy's Feeling	73.696%	Stinna Kaastrup (Denmark) riding Labbenhus Snovs	72.217%	Jens Lasse Dokan (Norway) riding Sisco	71.969%
Freestyle Class Ib	Stinna Kaastrup (Denmark) riding Labbenhus Snovs	76.600%	Pepo Puch (Austria) riding Good Boy's Feeling	75.150%	Katja Karjalainen (Finland) riding Rosie	73.050%
Class II
Individual Class II	Natasha Baker (United Kingdom) riding Cabral	73.190%	Britta Näpel (Germany) riding Aquilina	72.429%	Petra van de Sande (Netherlands) riding Valenica Z	72.333%
Freestyle Class II	Natasha Baker (United Kingdom) riding Cabral	76.250%	Britta Näpel (Germany) riding Aquilina	74.500%	Demi Vermeulen (Netherlands) riding Chiara	73.450%
Class III
Individual Class III	Hannelore Brenner (Germany) riding Women of the World	74.100%	Deborah Criddle (United Kingdom) riding LJT Akiles	73.233%	José Letartre (France) riding Warina	70.700%
Freestyle Class III	Deborah Criddle (United Kingdom) riding LJT Akiles	77.250%	Hannelore Brenner (Germany) riding Women of the World	76.200%	Sanne Voets (Netherlands) riding Vedet	
Class IV
Individual Class IV	Sophie Wells (United Kingdom) riding Valerius	74.097%	Henrik Weber Sibbesen (Netherlands) riding Rexton Royal	71.839%	Line Thorning Jørgensen (Denmark) riding di Caprio	71.064%
Freestyle Class IV	Sophie Wells (United Kingdom) riding Valerius	78.450%	Line Thorning Jørgensen (Denmark) riding di Caprio	75.750%	Frank Hosmar (Netherlands) riding Alphaville	74.90%

=== Medal table ===
Place	Nation	1st place, gold medalist(s)	2nd place, silver medalist(s)	3rd place, bronze medalist(s)	Total
1	Great Britain	8	3	0	11
2	Germany	1	3	1	5
2	Denmark	1	3	1	5
4	Austria	1	1	0	2
5	Netherlands	0	1	4	5
6	Norway	0	0	1	1
6	Sweden	0	0	1	1
6	Finland	0	0	1	1
6	Ireland	0	0	1	1
6	France	0	0	1	1
Total		11	11	11	33
