= Cabral (horse) =

Dressage horse (2001–2017)

- Breed: Trakehner
- Sire: Bujak (Trakehner)
- Grandsire: Sir Shostakovich (Thoroughbred)
- Dam: Casona (Trakehner)
- Maternal grandsire: Agar (Trakehner)
- Sex: Gelding
- Foaled: 2001
- Died: 26 February 2017 (aged 15–16)
- Colour: Dark Bay
- Owner: Mr Christian Landolt, Mr & Mrs P. Baker & Mrs D. Alder

Olympic medal record

Para-equestrian
Gold medal – first place	2012 London	Individual championship test grade II
Gold medal – first place	2012 London	Individual freestyle test grade II

Cabral (2001–2017), also known as JP, was a gold medalist dressage horse ridden by Natasha Baker. The Polish-born British dressage horse, a Paralympic gold winner (2012) in Rio, was euthanized.

== Background ==
JP was previously owned by Christian Landolt, a FEI Dressage and Eventing rider and judge. He brought JP to event however he was not bold enough in the cross country.

== Paralympics ==
Natasha Baker was selected as part of the para-dressage squad for Great Britain at the 2012 Summer Paralympics held in London, United Kingdom. In the individual championship test grade II event Baker and Cabral scored 76.857% to set a new Paralympic record for the grade II classification and win the gold medal ahead of German defending champion Britta Napel who won silver with a score of 76.000%.

The two won their second gold medal of the Games in the individual freestyle test grade II. They set a new Paralympic record of 82.800%, beating second placed Napel by over 5%.

== Death ==
Cabral was put down on 26 February 2017 after contracting a bacterial infection.
