= European Para-Dressage Championship =

The European Para-Dressage Championship is the European championship in para-dressage.

== Editions ==
- 2011 European Para-Dressage Championship
- 2013 European Para-Dressage Championship
