= Louise Watkin =

British Paralympic swimmer

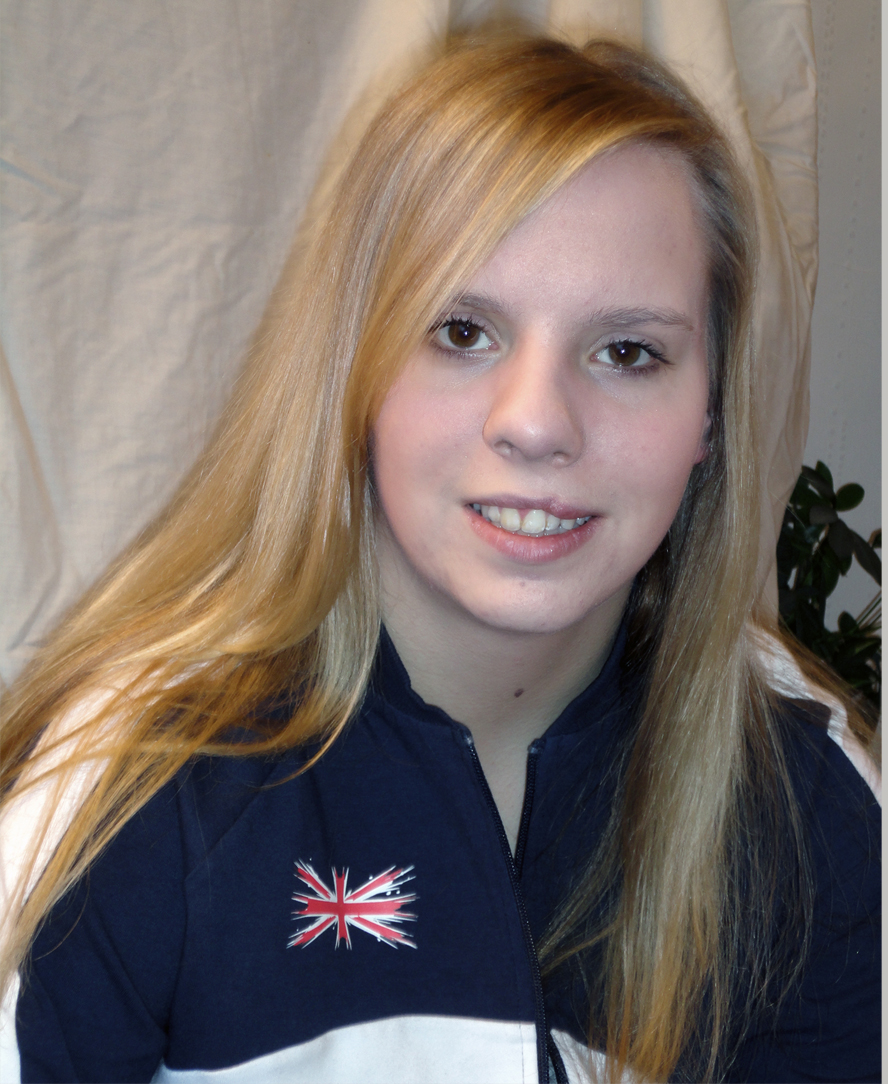

Personal information
- Nationality: United Kingdom
- Born: 13 August 1992 (age 33) Stockholm, Sweden

Sport
- Sport: Swimming
- Strokes: Freestyle; Breaststroke
Medal record
Representing Great Britain
Swimming
Paralympic Games
Silver medal – second place	2008 Beijing	Women's 100m freestyle S9
Silver medal – second place	2012 London	Women's 50m freestyle S9
Silver medal – second place	2012 London	Women's 4 x 100 metre medley relay 34pts
Bronze medal – third place	2008 Beijing	Women's 50m freestyle S9
Bronze medal – third place	2008 Beijing	Women's 100m breaststroke SB9
Bronze medal – third place	2008 Beijing	Women's 200m individual medley SM9
Bronze medal – third place	2012 London	Women's 4 x 100 metre freestyle relay 34pts
Bronze medal – third place	2012 London	200m individual medley SM9
IPC World Championships
Gold medal – first place	2010 Eindhoven	50m freestyle S9
Silver medal – second place	2010 Eindhoven	100m breaststroke SB9
Silver medal – second place	2010 Eindhoven	200m medley SM9
Silver medal – second place	2010 Eindhoven	4x100m freestyle relay 34pts
Silver medal – second place	2010 Eindhoven	4x100m medley relay 34pts
Bronze medal – third place	2010 Eindhoven	100m freestyle S9
IPC European Championships
Gold medal – first place	2009 Reykjavik	200 m medley SM9
Gold medal – first place	2009 Reykjavik	50 m freestyle S9
Gold medal – first place	2009 Reykjavik	100 m freestyle S9
Gold medal – first place	2009 Reykjavik	4×100 m medley relay 34pts
Silver medal – second place	2009 Reykjavik	100 m breaststroke SB9
Silver medal – second place	2009 Reykjavik	400 m freestyle SB9

Louise Stephanie Watkin (née Niklasson; born 13 August 1992 in Stockholm, Sweden) is a British Paralympic swimmer. Watkin swims in the S9 category and represented Great Britain in the 2012 Summer Paralympics, in which she won two silver and two bronze medals. She won one silver and three bronze medals at the 2008 Paralympics in Beijing.

== Career history ==
She came to the UK in 1996. She was born with Upper Limb Deficiency, and is missing her left hand. After trying out several sports and activities as a child, she settled on swimming at the age of 12.

Her first major competition was the World Championships in Durban, South Africa in 2006, and since then she has competed in the Beijing Paralympic Games in 2008, the European Championships in Reykjavik in 2009, and also the World Short Course Championships in Rio (also in 2009).

At the Beijing Paralympics, despite being only just 16, she won 1 silver and 3 bronze medals.

As of August 2012, Watkin is ranked no 1 in the world in 50m freestyle.

She is also ranked 3rd in the 100m freestyle, 2nd in the 200m IM, 8th in the 100m breastroke, and 10th in the 100m backstroke,

Between 15 and 21 August 2010, she competed in the World Championships, in Eindhoven, Netherlands, where she became world champion in 50m freestyle, beating world record holder Natalie Du Toit. She also won a silver medal in the 200m IM, 100m breaststroke, and the 4 × 100 m freestyle relay (34pts). Watkin also won a bronze medal in the 100m freestyle.

She is the European record holder for 100m freestyle (1 min 03.07 secs) and 200 I.M. (2 min 35.99 secs)

She used to train at the City of Salford Swimming Club full-time under the Salford Competitive Training Scheme, and was coached by John Stout, who was selected as the coach for Paralympics GB Swimming Team at the London 2012 Paralympic Games. However, Louise Watkin (and fellow medallist Heather Frederiksen) are looking for a new club after quitting City of Salford swim team after, according to BBC Sport, a breakdown in the relationship with coach John Stout.

In her first event, she won a bronze medal as a member of the Women's 4 x 100 metre freestyle relay 34pts team. She then won silver in the 50m freestyle S9 and bronze in the 200m individual medley SM9 events, before getting a silver medal in the Women's 4 x 100 metre medley relay 34pts.
