= Cycling at the 2012 Summer Paralympics – Men's time trial =

The Men's time trial track cycling events at the 2012 Summer Paralympics took place on 30 August – 1 September at London Velopark.

== Classification ==
Cyclists are given a classification depending on the type and extent of their disability. The classification system allows cyclists to compete against others with a similar level of function. The class number indicates the severity of impairment with "1" being most impaired.

Track cycling classes are:

- B: Blind and visually impaired cyclists use a Tandem bicycle with a sighted pilot on the front
- C 1-5: Cyclists with an impairment that affects their legs, arms or trunk but are capable of using a standard bicycle

== B ==
The men's 1 km time trial (C1-3) took place on 30 August.

WR = World record; DNF = Did not finish.

Rank	Name	Country	Time
1st place, gold medalist(s)	Neil Fachie; Pilot: Barney Storey	Great Britain	1:01.351 WR
2nd place, silver medalist(s)	Jose Enrique Porto Lareo; Pilot: Jose Antonio Villanueva Trinidad	Spain	1:02.707
3rd place, bronze medalist(s)	Rinne Oost; Pilot: Patrick Bos	Netherlands	1:03.052
4	Kieran Modra; Pilot: Scott McPhee	Australia	1:03.120
5	Bryce Lindores; Pilot: Sean Finning	Australia	1:03.896

== C1-3 ==
The men's 1 km time trial (C1-3) took place on 30 August.

Rank	Name	Country	Class	Factored Time
1st place, gold medalist(s)	Li Zhang Yu	China	C1	1:05.021 WR
2nd place, silver medalist(s)	Mark Colbourne	Great Britain	C1	1:08.471
3rd place, bronze medalist(s)	Tobias Graf	Germany	C2	1:09.979 WR
4	Darren Kenny	Great Britain	C3	1:10.203
5	Liang Guihua	China	C2	1:10.211
6	Xie Hao	China	C2	1:10.229
7	Rodrigo Fernando Lopez	Argentina	C1	1:10.689
8	Alexsey Obydennov	Russia	C3	1:10.995

== C4-5 ==
The men's 1 km time trial (C4-5) took place on 31 August.

Rank	Name	Country	Class	Factored Time
1st place, gold medalist(s)	Alfonso Cabello	Spain	C5	1:05.947 WR
2nd place, silver medalist(s)	Jon-Allan Butterworth	Great Britain	C5	1:05.985
3rd place, bronze medalist(s)	Liu Xinyang	China	C5	1:07.638
4	Ji Xiaofei	China	C4	1:08.860
5	Jiri Bouska	Czech Republic	C4	1:08.974
6	Masashi Ishii	Japan	C4	1:09.241
7	Carol-Eduard Novak	Romania	C4	1:09.390
8	Yegor Dementyev	Ukraine	C5	1:09.558
