= Cycling at the 2012 Summer Paralympics – Men's road time trial =

The Men's road time trial cycling events at the 2012 Summer Paralympics took place on September 5 at Brands Hatch.

== Classification ==
Cyclists are given a classification depending on the type and extent of their disability. The classification system allows cyclists to compete against others with a similar level of function. The class number indicates the severity of impairment with "1" being most impaired.

Cycling classes are:

- B: Blind and visually impaired cyclists use a Tandem bicycle with a sighted pilot on the front
- H 1–4: Cyclists with an impairment that affects their legs use a handcycle
- T 1–2: Cyclists with an impairment that affects their balance use a tricycle
- C 1–5: Cyclists with an impairment that affects their legs, arms and/or trunk but are capable of using a standard bicycle

== B ==
Gold	Silver	Bronze
Christian Venge; David Llaurado Caldero; Spain	Ivano Pizzi; Lucca Pizzi; Italy	James Brown; Damien Shaw; Ireland

== H1 ==
Gold	Silver	Bronze
Mark Rohan; Ireland	Koby Lion; Israel	Wolfgang Schattauer; Austria

== H2 ==
Gold	Silver	Bronze
Heinz Frei; Switzerland	Walter Ablinger; Austria	Vittorio Podesta; Italy

== H3 ==
Gold	Silver	Bronze
Rafał Wilk; Poland	Nigel Barley; Australia	Bernd Jeffre; Germany

== H4 ==
Gold	Silver	Bronze
Alessandro Zanardi; Italy	Norbert Mosandl; Germany	Oscar Sanchez; United States

== C1 ==
Gold	Silver	Bronze
Michael Teuber; Germany	Mark Colbourne; Great Britain	Li Zhang Yu; China

== C2 ==
Gold	Silver	Bronze
Tobias Graf; Germany	Liang Guihua; China	Maurice Eckhard Tio; Spain

== C3 ==
Gold	Silver	Bronze
David Nicholas; Australia	Joseph Berenyi; United States	Masaki Fujita; Japan

== C4 ==
Gold	Silver	Bronze
Jiří Ježek; Czech Republic	Carol-Eduard Novak; Romania	Jiri Bouska; Czech Republic

== C5 ==
Gold	Silver	Bronze
Yegor Dementyev; Ukraine	Liu Xinyang; China	Michael Gallagher; Australia
