= Swimming at the 2012 Summer Paralympics – Men's 100 metre breaststroke SB8 =

Event at the 2012 Summer Paralympics

Men's 100m Breaststroke SB8 at the XIV Paralympic Games
- Venue: London Aquatics Centre
- Dates: 1 September 2012
- Competitors: 21 from 18 nations
- Winning time: 1:07.45

Medalists
1st place, gold medalist(s)		Andriy Kalyna	Ukraine
2nd place, silver medalist(s)		Matthew Cowdrey	Australia
3rd place, bronze medalist(s)		Maurice Deelen	Netherlands

The men's 100m breaststroke SB8 event at the 2012 Summer Paralympics took place at the London Aquatics Centre on 1 September. There were three heats; the swimmers with the eight fastest times advanced to the final.

== Results ==
=== Heats ===
Competed from 10:25.

==== Heat 1 ====
Rank	Lane	Name	Nationality	Time	Notes
1	4	Maurice Deelen	Netherlands	1:11.02	Q
2	3	Evgeny Zimin	Russia	1:17.16	Q
3	7	Sharath Gayakwad	India	1:18.20	
4	5	Zhao Xueming	China	1:18.49	
5	6	Dalton Herendeen	United States	1:21.96	
6	2	Carlos Alberto Lopes Maciel	Brazil	1:22.74	
7	1	David Taylor	Barbados	2:30.17	

==== Heat 2 ====
Rank	Lane	Name	Nationality	Time	Notes
1	4	Matthew Cowdrey	Australia	1:11.53	Q, OC
2	5	Andreas Onea	Austria	1:12.04	Q
3	2	James Crisp	Great Britain	1:15.84	Q
4	7	Michele Ferrarin	Italy	1:17.67	
5	3	Eduard Samarin	Russia	1:18.05	
6	6	Martin Schulz	Germany	1:18.27	
7	1	Ferenc Csuri	Hungary	1:22.29	

==== Heat 3 ====
Rank	Lane	Name	Nationality	Time	Notes
1	4	Andriy Kalyna	Ukraine	1:08.27	Q
2	5	Krzysztof Paterka	Poland	1:16.37	Q
3	3	Sam Hynd	Great Britain	1:16.80	Q
4	2	Liu Ruijin	China	1:17.63	
5	7	Takuro Yamada	Japan	1:18.83	
6	6	Alejandro Sanchez Palomero	Spain	1:20.47	
7	1	Luis Armando Andrade Guillen	Mexico	1:22.35	

=== Final ===
Competed at 18:22.

Rank	Lane	Name	Nationality	Time	Notes
1st place, gold medalist(s)	4	Andriy Kalyna	Ukraine	1:07.45	
2nd place, silver medalist(s)	3	Matthew Cowdrey	Australia	1:09.88	OC
3rd place, bronze medalist(s)	5	Maurice Deelen	Netherlands	1:11.09	
4	6	Andreas Onea	Austria	1:11.35	
5	7	Krzysztof Paterka	Poland	1:14.76	
6	2	James Crisp	Great Britain	1:15.71	
7	1	Sam Hynd	Great Britain	1:16.64	
8	8	Evgeny Zimin	Russia	1:17.26	

Q = qualified for final. OC = Oceania Record.
