= Equestrian at the 2012 Summer Paralympics – Individual freestyle test grade II =

Equestrian – Individual freestyle test, grade II at the XIV Paralympic Games
- Venue: Greenwich Park
- Date: 1 September 2012
- Competitors: 21 from 14 nations
- Winning score: 82.800

Medalists
1st place, gold medalist(s)		Natasha Baker	Great Britain
2nd place, silver medalist(s)		Britta Napel	Germany
3rd place, bronze medalist(s)		Angelika Trabert	Germany

The individual freestyle test, grade II, para-equestrian dressage event at the 2012 Summer Paralympics was contested on 1 September at Greenwich Park in London.

The competition was assessed by a ground jury composed of five judges placed at locations designated E, H, C, M, and B. Each judge rated the competitors' performances with percentage scores for technical difficulty and artistic merit. The ten scores from the jury were then averaged to determine a rider's total percentage score.

== Ground jury ==
Judge at E	Freddy Leyman ( Belgium)
Judge at H	Sarah Rodger ( Great Britain)
Judge at C	Carlos Lopes ( Portugal), jury president
Judge at M	Kjell Myhre ( Norway)
Judge at B	Lilian Iannone ( Argentina)

== Results ==
Rank	Rider	Horse		Technical/Artistic & (Rank)					Tech/Art % (Rk)	Total % score
Rank	Rider	Horse		E	H	C	M	B	Tech/Art % (Rk)	Total % score
1st place, gold medalist(s)	Natasha Baker (GBR)	Cabral		85.500 (1)	79.000 (1)	85.500 (1)	80.500 (1)	83.500 (1)		82.800
1st place, gold medalist(s)	Natasha Baker (GBR)	Cabral	Tech:	79.500 (1)	79.000 (1)	81.500 (1)	78.500 (1)	81.500 (1)	80.000 (1)	
1st place, gold medalist(s)	Natasha Baker (GBR)	Cabral	Art:	91.500 (1)	79.000 (1)	89.500 (1)	82.500 (1)	85.500 (1)	85.600 (1)	
2nd place, silver medalist(s)	Britta Napel (GER)	Aquilina 3		77.750 (3)	72.250 (6)	79.250 (4)	77.750 (2)	80.000 (2)		77.400
2nd place, silver medalist(s)	Britta Napel (GER)	Aquilina 3	Tech:	77.000 (2)	72.000 (5)	78.500 (2)	76.500 (2)	76.500 (2)	76.100 (2)	
2nd place, silver medalist(s)	Britta Napel (GER)	Aquilina 3	Art:	78.500 (4)	72.500 (7)	80.000 (4)	79.000 (2)	83.500 (2)	78.700 (2)	
3rd place, bronze medalist(s)	Angelika Trabert (GER)	Ariva-Avanti		79.750 (2)	75.500 (2)	80.000 (3)	74.750 (3)	70.750 (8)		76.150
3rd place, bronze medalist(s)	Angelika Trabert (GER)	Ariva-Avanti	Tech:	76.000 (3)	75.000 (2)	76.500 (3)	72.000 (3)	71.500 (4)	74.200 (3)	
3rd place, bronze medalist(s)	Angelika Trabert (GER)	Ariva-Avanti	Art:	83.500 (2)	76.000 (2)	83.500 (3)	77.500 (3)	70.000 (9)	78.100 (3)	
4	Eilish Byrne (IRL)	Youri		72.000 (7)	75.000 (3)	81.000 (2)	74.000 (4)	74.250 (4)		75.250
4	Eilish Byrne (IRL)	Youri	Tech:	69.500 (5)	74.000 (3)	75.500 (4)	71.500 (4)	74.500 (3)	73.000 (4)	
4	Eilish Byrne (IRL)	Youri	Art:	74.500 (7)	76.000 (2)	86.500 (2)	76.500 (4)	74.000 (4)	77.500 (4)	
5	Rebecca Hart (USA)	Lord Ludger		73.750 (5)	73.750 (4)	75.500 (5)	71.500 (6)	71.750 (7)		73.250
5	Rebecca Hart (USA)	Lord Ludger	Tech:	68.500 (7)	72.500 (4)	73.000 (6)	69.000 (7)	69.500 (8)	70.500 (6)	
5	Rebecca Hart (USA)	Lord Ludger	Art:	79.000 (3)	75.000 (4)	78.000 (6)	74.000 (7)	74.000 (4)	76.000 (6)	
6	Barbara Minneci (BEL)	Barilla		72.750 (6)	71.000 (7)	75.250 (6)	71.000 (8)	75.500 (3)		73.100
6	Barbara Minneci (BEL)	Barilla	Tech:	69.000 (6)	69.000 (7)	70.500 (8)	66.500 (10)	71.000 (7)	69.200 (8)	
6	Barbara Minneci (BEL)	Barilla	Art:	76.500 (5)	73.000 (6)	80.000 (4)	75.500 (6)	80.000 (3)	77.000 (5)	
7	Gert Bolmer (NED)	Vorman		70.250 (8)	70.250 (8)	74.750 (7)	71.000 (8)	72.000 (6)		71.650
7	Gert Bolmer (NED)	Vorman	Tech:	68.000 (8)	68.000 (8)	73.000 (6)	69.500 (6)	71.500 (4)	70.000 (7)	
7	Gert Bolmer (NED)	Vorman	Art:	72.500 (8)	72.500 (7)	76.500 (7)	72.500 (8)	72.500 (7)	73.300 (7)	
8	Lauren Barwick (CAN)	Off To Paris		76.000 (4)	65.750 (11)	74.250 (8)	71.500 (6)	70.000 (9)		71.500
8	Lauren Barwick (CAN)	Off To Paris	Tech:	76.000 (3)	66.000 (9)	73.500 (5)	71.000 (5)	69.000 (10)	71.100 (5)	
8	Lauren Barwick (CAN)	Off To Paris	Art:	76.000 (6)	65.500 (14)	75.000 (8)	72.000 (9)	71.000 (8)	71.900 (9)	
9	Wendy Moller (RSA)	First Lady Van Prins		69.000 (9)	67.750 (9)	67.250 (12)	72.750 (5)	72.750 (5)		69.900
9	Wendy Moller (RSA)	First Lady Van Prins	Tech:	67.000 (9)	65.500 (11)	65.500 (12)	69.000 (7)	71.500 (4)	67.700 (9)	
9	Wendy Moller (RSA)	First Lady Van Prins	Art:	71.000 (10)	70.000 (9)	69.000 (11)	76.500 (4)	74.000 (4)	72.100 (8)	
10	Dale Dedrick (USA)	Bonifatius		68.000 (10)	72.500 (5)	70.250 (9)	68.000 (10)	67.000 (11)		69.150
10	Dale Dedrick (USA)	Bonifatius	Tech:	64.500 (11)	71.500 (6)	69.000 (9)	66.000 (11)	66.500 (11)	67.500 (10)	
10	Dale Dedrick (USA)	Bonifatius	Art:	71.500 (9)	73.500 (5)	71.500 (9)	70.000 (10)	67.500 (12)	70.800 (10)	
11	Elisa Melaranci (BRA)	Zabelle		65.500 (12)	64.250 (15)	69.500 (10)	66.500 (12)	69.750 (10)		67.100
11	Elisa Melaranci (BRA)	Zabelle	Tech:	64.000 (13)	62.500 (16)	68.500 (10)	66.000 (11)	69.500 (8)	66.100 (12)	
11	Elisa Melaranci (BRA)	Zabelle	Art:	67.000 (12)	66.000 (12)	70.500 (10)	67.000 (13)	70.000 (9)	68.100 (11)	
12	Erika Baitenmann Haakh (MEX)	Casablanca		65.250 (13)	63.500 (17)	68.250 (11)	66.750 (11)	65.750 (13)		65.900
12	Erika Baitenmann Haakh (MEX)	Casablanca	Tech:	64.500 (11)	65.000 (12)	68.000 (11)	67.500 (9)	66.000 (12)	66.200 (11)	
12	Erika Baitenmann Haakh (MEX)	Casablanca	Art:	66.000 (16)	62.000 (17)	68.500 (12)	66.000 (15)	65.500 (14)	65.600 (13)	
13	Caroline Nielsen (DEN)	Leon		66.500 (11)	65.250 (13)	63.000 (18)	64.000 (16)	65.500 (14)		64.850
13	Caroline Nielsen (DEN)	Leon	Tech:	66.000 (10)	66.000 (9)	61.500 (18)	65.000 (13)	66.000 (12)	64.900 (13)	
13	Caroline Nielsen (DEN)	Leon	Art:	67.000 (12)	64.500 (16)	64.500 (18)	63.000 (16)	65.000 (15)	64.800 (15)	
14	Francesca Salvade (ITA)	Come On		64.000 (16)	64.250 (15)	65.500 (14)	66.000 (13)	64.000 (15)		64.750
14	Francesca Salvade (ITA)	Come On	Tech:	60.500 (16)	62.500 (16)	62.500 (17)	62.500 (16)	60.500 (17)	61.700 (17)	
14	Francesca Salvade (ITA)	Come On	Art:	67.500 (11)	66.000 (12)	68.500 (12)	69.500 (11)	67.500 (12)	67.800 (12)	
15	Maria Otheguy Gonzalez (MEX)	Welton Adonis		62.750 (17)	65.500 (12)	66.500 (13)	65.500 (14)	57.250 (19)		63.500
15	Maria Otheguy Gonzalez (MEX)	Welton Adonis	Tech:	60.000 (17)	63.500 (15)	65.500 (12)	63.500 (14)	57.000 (19)	61.900 (16)	
15	Maria Otheguy Gonzalez (MEX)	Welton Adonis	Art:	65.500 (17)	67.500 (11)	67.500 (14)	67.500 (12)	57.500 (18)	65.100 (14)	
16	Anthony Dawson (RSA)	Roffelaar		60.250 (18)	66.250 (10)	64.750 (15)	64.750 (15)	61.250 (17)		63.450
16	Anthony Dawson (RSA)	Roffelaar	Tech:	57.500 (18)	64.000 (13)	64.500 (14)	63.000 (15)	62.500 (16)	62.300 (14)	
16	Anthony Dawson (RSA)	Roffelaar	Art:	63.000 (18)	68.500 (10)	65.000 (15)	66.500 (14)	60.000 (16)	64.600 (16)	
17	Anthea Gunner (NZL)	Huntingdale Incognito		65.250 (13)	64.500 (14)	64.250 (16)	61.500 (17)	58.250 (18)		62.750
17	Anthea Gunner (NZL)	Huntingdale Incognito	Tech:	64.000 (13)	64.000 (13)	63.500 (15)	60.000 (17)	59.000 (18)	62.100 (15)	
17	Anthea Gunner (NZL)	Huntingdale Incognito	Art:	66.500 (15)	65.000 (15)	65.000 (15)	63.000 (16)	57.500 (18)	63.400 (17)	
18	Petra van de Sande (NED)	Valencia Z		56.750 (19)	58.500 (19)	64.000 (17)	61.250 (18)	66.750 (12)		61.450
18	Petra van de Sande (NED)	Valencia Z	Tech:	57.500 (18)	60.000 (18)	63.000 (16)	59.500 (18)	65.000 (14)	61.000 (18)	
18	Petra van de Sande (NED)	Valencia Z	Art:	56.000 (19)	57.000 (19)	65.000 (15)	63.000 (16)	68.500 (11)	61.900 (18)	
19	Fernando Figueroa Romero (MEX)	Uwannabemine		65.000 (15)	59.500 (18)	55.500 (19)	58.500 (19)	62.000 (16)		60.100
19	Fernando Figueroa Romero (MEX)	Uwannabemine	Tech:	63.000 (15)	58.000 (19)	56.000 (19)	59.000 (19)	64.000 (15)	60.000 (19)	
19	Fernando Figueroa Romero (MEX)	Uwannabemine	Art:	67.000 (12)	61.000 (18)	55.000 (19)	58.000 (19)	60.000 (16)	60.200 (19)	
	Thomas Haller (AUT)	Hallers Dessino	Retired							
	Silvia Veratti (ITA)	Zadok	Withdrawn							
