= Swimming at the 2012 Summer Paralympics – Women's 50 metre freestyle S9 =

Women's 50 metre freestyle S9 at the XIV Paralympic Games
- Venue: London Aquatics Centre
- Dates: 5 September
- Competitors: 12 from 9 nations

Medalists
1st place, gold medalist(s)		Lin Ping	China
2nd place, silver medalist(s)		Louise Watkin	Great Britain
3rd place, bronze medalist(s)		Ellie Cole	Australia

The women's 50 metre freestyle S9 event at the 2012 Paralympic Games took place on 5 September, at the London Aquatics Centre.

Two heats were held, each of them with six competitors. The swimmers with the eight fastest times advanced to the final.

== Heats ==
Rank	Heat	Lane	Name	Nationality	Time	Notes
1	2	5	Louise Watkin	Great Britain	29.35	Q
2	2	6	Lin Ping	China	29.59	Q, AS
3	2	4	Sarai Gascón Moreno	Spain	29.62	Q
4	1	3	Ellie Cole	Australia	29.75	Q
5	2	3	Annabelle Williams	Australia	30.03	Q
6	1	5	Irina Grazhdanova	Russia	30.14	Q
7	1	4	Natalie du Toit	South Africa	30.16	Q
8	1	6	Elizabeth Stone	United States	30.39	Q
9	1	7	Daniela Gimenez	Argentina	30.82	
10	1	2	Amy Marren	Great Britain	31.02	
11	2	2	Lauren Steadman	Great Britain	31.04	
12	2	7	Katarina Roxon	Canada	31.78	

== Final ==
Rank	Lane	Name	Nationality	Time	Notes
1st place, gold medalist(s)	5	Lin Ping	China	29.12	PR
2nd place, silver medalist(s)	4	Louise Watkin	Great Britain	29.21	
3rd place, bronze medalist(s)	6	Ellie Cole	Australia	29.28	OC
4	3	Sarai Gascón Moreno	Spain	29.44	
5	7	Irina Grazhdanova	Russia	29.66	
6	2	Annabelle Williams	Australia	29.76	
7	1	Natalie du Toit	South Africa	29.84	
8	8	Elizabeth Stone	United States	30.72	
