= Equestrian at the 2012 Summer Paralympics – Individual championship test grade II =

Equestrian – Individual championship test, grade II at the XIV Paralympic Games
- Venue: Greenwich Park
- Date: 1 September 2012
- Competitors: 23 from 15 nations
- Winning score: 76.857

Medalists
1st place, gold medalist(s)		Natasha Baker	Great Britain
2nd place, silver medalist(s)		Britta Napel	Germany
3rd place, bronze medalist(s)		Angelika Trabert	Germany

The individual championship test, grade II, para-equestrian dressage event at the 2012 Summer Paralympics was contested on 1 September at Greenwich Park in London.

The competition was assessed by a ground jury composed of five judges placed at locations designated E, H, C, M, and B. Each judge rated the competitors' performances with a percentage score. The five scores from the jury were then averaged to determine a rider's total percentage score.

== Ground jury ==
Judge at E	Carlos Lopes ( Portugal)
Judge at H	Anne Prain ( France)
Judge at C	Lilian Iannone ( Argentina), jury president
Judge at M	Gudrun Hofinga ( Germany)
Judge at B	Freddy Leyman ( Belgium)

== Results ==
T = Team Member (see Equestrian at the 2012 Summer Paralympics – Team).

Rank	Rider	Horse	Percentage score (and rank)					Total % score	Note
Rank	Rider	Horse	E	H	C	M	B	Total % score	Note
1st place, gold medalist(s)	Natasha Baker (GBR)	Cabral	76.429 (1)	75.000 (3)	76.667 (4)	75.952 (2)	80.238 (1)	76.857	
2nd place, silver medalist(s)	Britta Napel (GER)	Aquilina 3	72.619 (5)	72.857 (4)	78.571 (1)	77.619 (1)	78.571 (3)	76.048	T
3rd place, bronze medalist(s)	Angelika Trabert (GER)	Ariva-Avanti	71.429 (7)	79.286 (1)	74.286 (6)	75.714 (3)	79.286 (2)	76.000	T
4	Petra van de Sande (NED)	Valencia Z	74.524 (2)	76.190 (2)	75.952 (5)	67.143 (9)	78.571 (3)	74.476	T
5	Eilish Byrne (IRL)	Youri	74.524 (2)	70.952 (7)	78.333 (2)	70.714 (4)	72.619 (6)	73.429	T
6	Lauren Barwick (CAN)	Off To Paris	71.429 (7)	68.810 (10)	76.905 (3)	67.857 (7)	74.286 (5)	71.857	T
7	Gert Bolmer (NED)	Vorman	72.857 (4)	71.190 (6)	68.810 (17)	67.857 (7)	70.000 (8)	70.143	T
8	Barbara Minneci (BEL)	Barilla	69.286 (13)	70.476 (8)	70.238 (13)	68.333 (6)	72.143 (7)	70.095	T
9	Silvia Veratti (ITA)	Zadok	68.333 (15)	71.905 (5)	73.333 (7)	68.571 (5)	67.381 (9)	69.905	T
10	Caroline Nielsen (DEN)	Leon	70.238 (12)	69.048 (9)	72.857 (9)	66.190 (10)	66.905 (12)	69.048	
11	Rebecca Hart (USA)	Lord Ludger	70.476 (11)	66.190 (13)	73.333 (7)	66.190 (10)	65.238 (13)	68.286	T
12	Erika Baitenmann Haakh (MEX)	Casablanca	70.714 (10)	67.143 (11)	69.048 (15)	66.190 (10)	67.381 (9)	68.095	T
13	Francesca Salvade (ITA)	Come On	68.571 (14)	65.000 (15)	71.190 (11)	64.762 (15)	67.381 (9)	67.381	T
14	Elisa Melaranci (BRA)	Zabelle	71.190 (9)	67.143 (11)	69.762 (14)	61.429 (18)	65.238 (13)	66.952	T
15	Wendy Moller (RSA)	First Lady Van Prins	64.524 (19)	63.810 (16)	71.667 (10)	65.000 (14)	65.000 (15)	66.000	T
16	Thomas Haller (AUT)	Hallers Dessino	66.190 (17)	62.381 (18)	71.190 (11)	63.333 (16)	62.619 (17)	65.143	
17	Dale Dedrick (USA)	Bonifatius	72.143 (6)	66.190 (13)	60.238 (20)	63.333 (16)	61.190 (18)	64.619	T
18	Anthony Dawson (RSA)	Roffelaar	66.429 (16)	63.095 (17)	69.048 (15)	65.476 (13)	58.810 (21)	64.571	T
19	Anthea Gunner (NZL)	Huntingdale Incognito	65.714 (18)	62.381 (18)	64.524 (19)	61.190 (19)	65.000 (15)	63.762	
20	Maria Otheguy Gonzalez (MEX)	Welton Adonis	61.429 (20)	62.381 (18)	65.238 (18)	59.048 (20)	60.238 (20)	61.667	T
21	Fernando Figueroa Romero (MEX)	Uwannabemine	58.810 (21)	57.857 (21)	59.286 (21)	56.905 (21)	61.190 (18)	58.810	T
	Grace Bowman (AUS)	Kirby Park Joy	Eliminated						T
	Antonella Cecilia (ITA)	Corlord	Eliminated						T
