= Mark Colbourne =

Former Welsh paralympic-cyclist (born 1969)

Mark Colbourne MBE
Personal information
- Full name: Mark Colbourne
- Born: 9 November 1969 (age 56) Tredegar, Wales

Cycling career
- Sport: Cycling
- Discipline: Track
Medal record
Representing Great Britain
Men's track cycling
Paralympic Games
Gold medal – first place	2012 London	Individual pursuit C1
Silver medal – second place	2012 London	1km time trial C1-3
Men's road cycling
Paralympic Games
Silver medal – second place	2012 London	Road Time Trial C1

Mark Lee Colbourne MBE (born 9 November 1969) is a former Welsh paralympic-cyclist, who competed for both Wales and Great Britain.

== Early life ==
Colbourne was born on 9 November 1969 in Tredegar, Monmouthshire, Wales. He played volleyball at international level for Wales between 1990 and 1993.

He broke his back in 2009 after falling 35 feet (11 m) when forced into an emergency landing whilst paragliding.

== Cycling career ==
Following his accident Colbourne began cycling through Disability Sport Wales. He competes in the C1 classification for riders on upright bikes with the most severe disability. He trained with disabled cycling coach Neil Smith at the Newport Velodrome and made his first appearance in a track race in May 2010 at the Wales Grand Prix.

In 2011 he won his first UCI Para-Cycling World Cup medals. He took bronze in the C1 time trail in Segovia, Spain at his debut at World Cup level. At the round in Baie-Comeau, Canada, he won the silver medal in the same event behind Juan Jose Mendez Fernandez of Spain. His first World Championship medal was a silver at the 2011 UCI Para-Cycling Road World Championships held in Roskilde, Denmark.

In 2012 Colbourne won his first world title, taking the gold medal in the C1 3 km individual pursuit at the 2012 UCI Para-Cycling Track World Championships in Los Angeles, United States. At the same Championships he won the silver medal in the C1 1 km time trial.

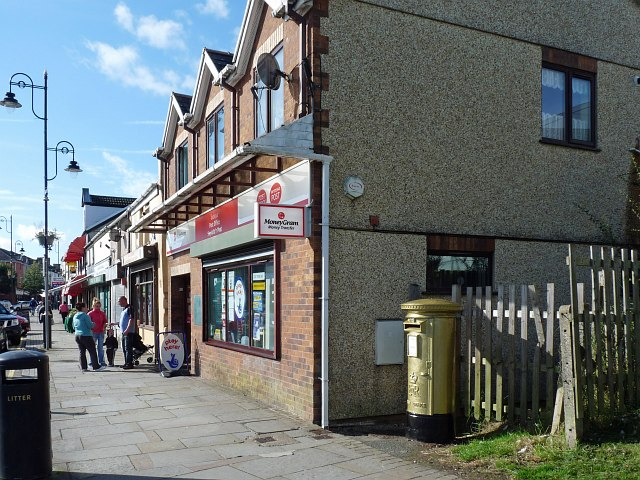
A gold postbox outside Tredegar post office to commemorate the gold medal Colbourne won at the 2012 Summer Paralympics in London

He was selected as part of the cycling team for Great Britain at the 2012 Summer Paralympics. On 30 August 2012 Colbourne won a silver medal and Great Britain's first medal of the 2012 Paralympics, in the C1-3 1 km time trial. On 31 August 2012 he won a gold medal in the C1 3 km individual pursuit after breaking the world record in both the qualification round and the final. He is scheduled to compete in two road cycling events; the C1 road time trial, on 5 September; and the C1-3 road race on 6 September.

Colbourne was appointed Member of the Order of the British Empire (MBE) in the 2013 New Year Honours for services to cycling. In August 2013 Colbourne announced his retirement from para-cycling.

== See also ==
- 2012 Olympics gold post boxes in the United Kingdom
