= Günther Matzinger =

Austrian Paralympic athlete

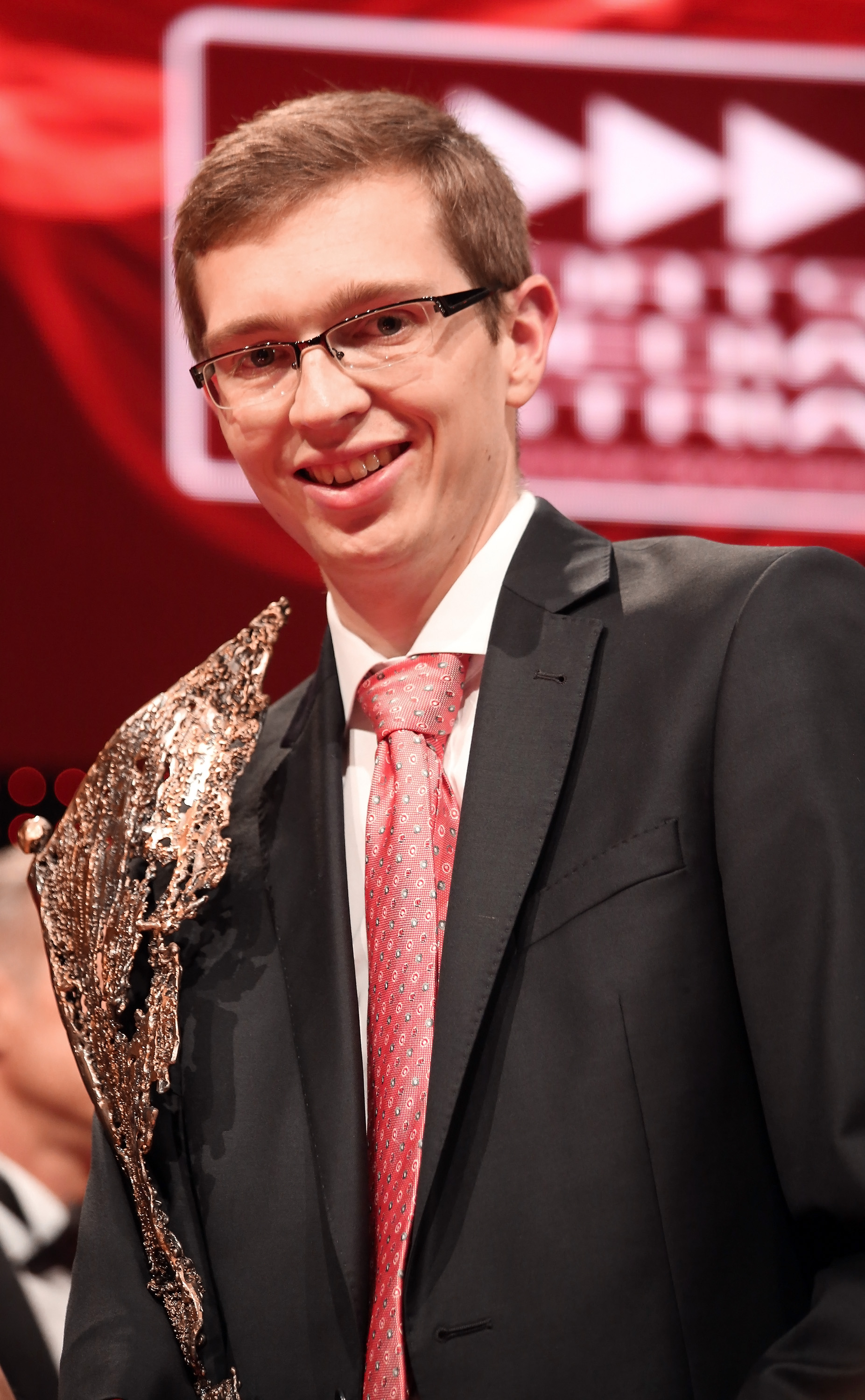

Personal information
- Nationality: Austrian
- Born: Günther Matzinger; 16 May 1987 (age 39)

Sport
- Country: Austria
- Sport: Athletics
- Disability class: T46
- Club: VCA Salzburg

Achievements and titles
- Paralympic finals: London 2012: Javelin throw
Medal record
Men's Athletics
Representing Austria
European Games
Gold medal – first place	2015 Baku	Mixed team
Paralympic Games
Gold medal – first place	2012 London	400 m T46
Gold medal – first place	2012 London	800 m T46
IPC Athletics World Championships
Gold medal – first place	2013 Lyon	400 m T46
Silver medal – second place	2011 Christchurch	400 m T46
Bronze medal – third place	2011 Christchurch	800 m T46
IPC Athletics European Championships
Silver medal – second place	2016 Grosseto	200 m T47
- Updated on 9 June 2014

Günther Matzinger (born 16 May 1987) is an Austrian track and field athlete who competes in disability athletics in the T46 category. He won the gold medal for the 800 metres at the 2012 Paralympic Games for his category with a new World Record. Matzinger won a silver and bronze medal at the 2011 World Championships.
