= Ricky Balshaw =

British para equestrian rider

Personal information
- Nationality: British
- Born: November 10, 1986 (age 39)
- Occupation: Para-Athlete (Dressage_Grade 1b)
- Years active: 2002–2016
Medal record
Para-Dressage
Representing Great Britain
Summer Paralympics
Silver medal – second place	2008 Beijing	Freestyle dressage
FEI World Equestrian Games
Bronze medal – third place	2007 Hartpury	Freestyle
Silver medal – second place	2010 Kentucky	Individual competition
Silver medal – second place	2013 Denmark	Individual competition & freestyle

Ricky Balshaw (born 10 November 1986) is a British para equestrian rider who represented Britain in the Beijing 2008 Paralympics, winning the silver medal with Deacons Georgi (now semi-retired). He also holds two world-championships and one European award.

== Biography ==
Balshaw was born with cerebral palsy which has restricted the muscle movement in both his legs and hands. He also has very little natural balance. With what he does have, he has been taught through physiotherapy to walk with the aid of two sticks.

When he was 4 years old, his physiotherapist recommended that he took up horse riding as a part of the physiotherapy. Balshaw, confused by what he had just heard decided to try it. He started riding at Brockton Court Riding for the Disabled Association Group.

At the age of 10, Balshaw was the seventh person in Europe to be selected for a state-of-the-art operation on his spinal cord. The procedure involved opening his back up and then artificially stimulating each nerve ending to see which made the worst results on his muscles and, in theory, to see which muscles were working against him. Once identified, they were to cut the nerve effectively killing to muscles. Although it was a relatively new surgery, it was a success, though Balshaw had to learn to walk and ride again.

Balshaw made his debut in 2002 and in the following year he was a member of the British team.

When Balshaw turned 14 he was put on the World Class programme and was sent all over the world competing and training to gain experience. In 2003, he was named as first reserve for the World Championships. He was under a great deal of stress at that point, not only finding out that he was to replace a very close friend who could attend because of health reasons, but being given less than three weeks to prepare. Balshaw describes that moment as one of the most bittersweet moments, he has experienced. He was in the Grade ii category, his first big opportunity, and narrowly missed a bronze medal.

The grade boundaries were changed and Balshaw became a Grade 1b rider. With this new grade, Balshaw was given his second opportunity at the World Championships in 2007. Riding Julia Lazzari’s horse, Deacons Giorgi, who was kindly loaned to Balshaw exceeded all expectation and gained a bronze medal. In 2008, the Balshaw was part of the British Para Dressage team at the Beijing Paralympics. Excited by what he described as "one of the best experiences of his life" Balshaw and Deacons Giorgi (retired) returned to the UK with a Silver medal, coming second to Lee Pearson another British Paralympics team member.

Shortly after returning from Beijing, Balshaw put Giorgi into semi-retirement and started training a new horse named "Bungle". During one of his training sessions Balshaw fell from the horse, and with his foot stuck in the stirrup, he was dragged by his horse resulting in a few broken ribs as well as smashing his knee, which required an operation. The horse was an ex-show jumping horse and threw Balshaw again, cracking his skull. After he recovered, he gave up Bungle and took on a new horse, "Academy Award". He made the WEG FEI World Equestrian Games selection in 2010, and yet again was ranked Silver.

towards the end of 2011, Balshaw was thrown from his horse and broke his back. Not realising at the time, he tried to get up and remount his horse before he knew that something was seriously wrong. He telephoned an ambulance and when the crew arrived at the yard, they were astonished that he had moved. Doctors told Balshaw that it would be at least eight to nine months before he could ride again. Ignoring the advice he was back on his horse 12 weeks later. Balshaw returned to training but because of the broken back he was not selected for the London Paralympics 2012 games.

He resumed training with his latest horse, LJT Engaarrds Solitaire (Sid for short). They won double silver at the FEI European Championships 2013 in Herning, Denmark, coming second to Pepo Puch.

Balshaw had intended to pursue qualification for the 2016 Summer Olympics in Rio de Janeiro, Brazil, but did not participate, deciding to retire from the sport after a series of further injuries. Balshaw, whose home is in Telford, Shropshire, took up employment as a car salesman for Furrows of Shrewsbury.

Ricky has changed career, now performing as a stand up comedian. He appeared in the Wolverhampton heat of the 2021 New Comedy awards from the BBC and reached the semi-final stage.

He is represented by the Fab Comedy and can be found performing all over the UK.

He also won "Best New Act" in the 2021 Midlands Comedy Awards.

== Quotation ==
"He lends me his legs and we take on the world" - Ricky Balshaw

== Awards and trophies ==
- World Championship 2007: freestyle Bronze
- Beijing Paralympics 2008: individual Silver
- FEI World Equestrian Games 2010: individual Silver
- FEI European Championships 2013: individual and freestyle Silver
- Best New Act: Midland Comedy Awards 2021
- Semi Finalist: BBC New Comedy Awards 2021

== TV appearances ==
- Road to London 2012: That Paralympic Show
- Best of British

== See also ==
- Paralympic Games
- 2008 Summer Paralympics
- Equestrian at the 2008 Summer Paralympics
- Para-equestrian
