= Wolfgang Schattauer =

Austrian cyclist

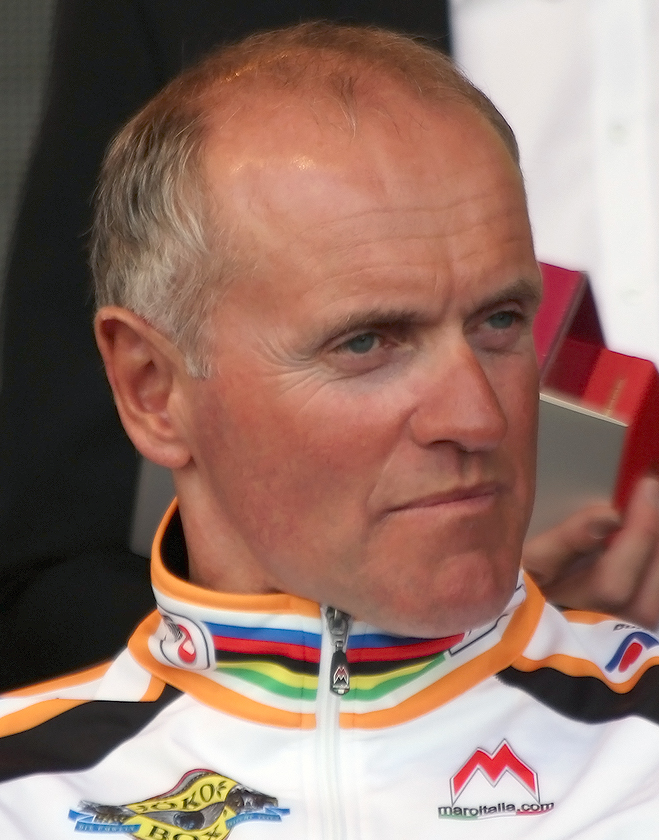
- Schattauer in 2013

Personal information
- Born: 8 October 1959 (age 66) Vienna, Austria

Sport
- Country: Austria
- Sport: Paralympic cycling
- Retired: 2021
Medal record
Paralympic cycling
Representing Austria
Paralympic Games
Gold medal – first place	2008 Beijing	Time trial HC A
Bronze medal – third place	2012 London	Time trial H1
Bronze medal – third place	2012 London	Road race H1
World Championships
Gold medal – first place	2006 Aigle	Road race HC A
Gold medal – first place	2007 Bordeaux	Road race HC A
Gold medal – first place	2007 Bordeaux	Time trial HC A
Gold medal – first place	2009 Bogogno	Road race HC A
Gold medal – first place	2010 Baie-Comeau	Time trial HC A
Silver medal – second place	2006 Aigle	Time trial HC A
Silver medal – second place	2009 Bogogno	Team relay
Silver medal – second place	2010 Baie-Comeau	Road race HC A
Bronze medal – third place	2004 Lac Lemon	Road race HC A
Bronze medal – third place	2011 Roskilde	Time trial HC A

Wolfgang Schattauer (born 8 October 1959) is an Austrian retired Paralympic cyclist who competed at international cycling competitions. He is a Paralympic champion and five-time world champion in road cycling. He has competed at the Paralympic Games four times.
