= Natasha Baker =

British para-equestrian

Natasha Baker OBE
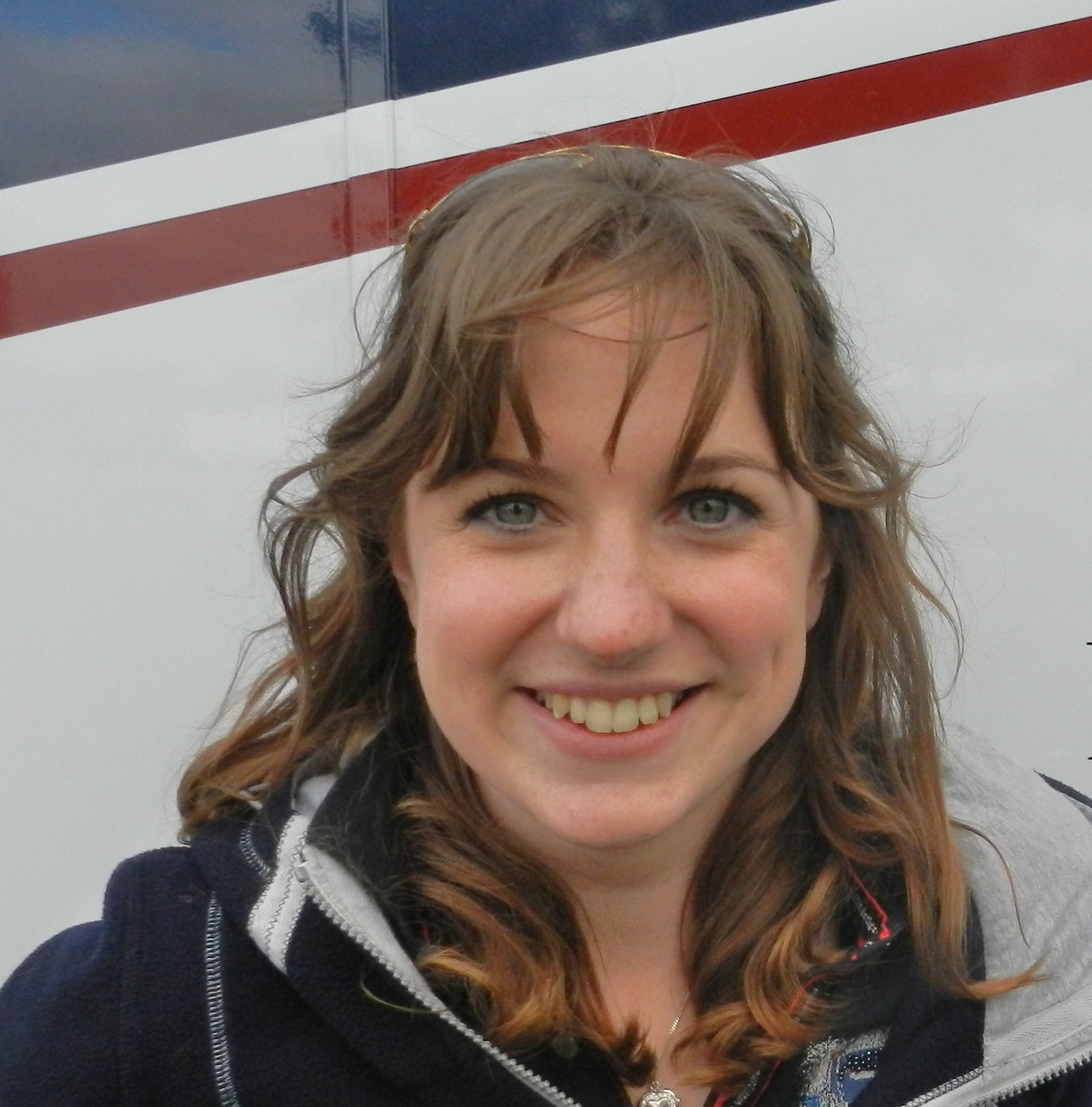
- Natasha Baker

Personal information
- Discipline: Para-dressage
- Born: 30 December 1989 (age 35); Hammersmith, London, England
- Horse(s): Cabral ("JP") (2001–2017); Sookie St. James; Mount St John Diva Dannebrog; Keystone Dawn Chorus ("Lottie") (2011–present)

Website
- natasha-baker.com
Medal record
Para-equestrian
Representing Great Britain
Event	1st	2nd	3rd
Paralympic Games	6	2	2
World Games	1	3	0
Total	7	5	2
Paralympic Games
Gold medal – first place	2012 London	Individual championship test grade II
Gold medal – first place	2012 London	Individual freestyle test grade II
Gold medal – first place	2016 Rio	Individual championship test grade II
Gold medal – first place	2016 Rio	Individual freestyle test grade II
Gold medal – first place	2016 Rio	Team
Gold medal – first place	2020 Tokyo	Team open
Silver medal – second place	2020 Tokyo	Individual championship test grade III
Silver medal – second place	2020 Tokyo	Individual freestyle test grade III
Bronze medal – third place	2024 Paris	Individual championship test grade III
Bronze medal – third place	2024 Paris	Individual freestyle test grade III
World Games
Gold medal – first place	2014 Caen	Team
Silver medal – second place	2014 Caen	Individual championship test grade II
Silver medal – second place	2018 Tryon	Individual championship test grade III
Silver medal – second place	2018 Tryon	Team

Natasha Louise Baker (born 30 December 1989) is a British para-equestrian who won 2 gold medals at the 2012 Summer Paralympics, 3 at the 2016 Summer Paralympics, and 1 more in the 2020 Summer Paralympics.

== Early life ==
Baker was born on 30 December 1989 in Hammersmith, London, England. At the age of 14 months she contracted transverse myelitis, an inflammation in her spine that affected her nerve endings. She was left with weakness and no feeling in her legs.

== Equestrianism ==
Natasha Baker began riding horses as physiotherapists said it would help to strengthen her muscles. She started riding competitively at the age of nine at her local Riding for the Disabled Association in Buckinghamshire. Whilst watching the 2000 Summer Paralympics, at the age of ten, she decided she wanted to compete in the Paralympics. As she lacks strength in her legs, she trains her horses to respond to her voice and to movements she can make in the saddle. She competes in the grade III Paralympic classification.

In 2011, she made her first appearance at a senior championships, competing at the European Championships held in Moorsele, Belgium, where she won gold medals in both the individual and freestyle grade II events.

She was selected as part of the dressage squad for Great Britain at the 2012 Summer Paralympics held in London, United Kingdom. In the individual championship test grade II event Baker, riding Cabral, an 11-year-old gelding, scored 76.857% to set a new Paralympic record for the grade II classification and win the gold medal ahead of German defending champion Britta Napel who won silver with a score of 76.000%. She won her second gold medal of the Games in the individual freestyle test grade II. She set a new Paralympic record of 82.800% as she beat second placed Napel by over 5%.

Baker was appointed Member of the Order of the British Empire (MBE) in the 2013 New Year Honours for services to equestrianism and Officer of the Order of the British Empire (OBE) in the 2022 New Years Honours, also for services to equestrianism. She was awarded the Freedom of the Borough of Hillingdon in September 2012.

== Television commentating ==
Baker commentated on Para Dressage at the 2017 FEI European Championships in Gothenburg alongside Rupert Bell. She then went on to commentate on Western European League Dressage World Cup later that year and continue to do so either as colour commentator or solo.

She was also part of the commentary team at the 2018 FEI World Equestrian Games and the 2019 FEI European Championships for Para Dressage and the Dressage World Cup Finals in 2018 & 2019.

== Personal life ==
Baker married Marc Jaconelli in March 2022 and she has two children.

== See also ==
- 2012 Olympics gold post boxes in the United Kingdom
