= Keegan (given name) =

Keegan is an Anglicisation of the Irish clan name Mac Aodhagáin, now often used as a forename. The name means "son (or descendant) of Aodhagán" (a diminutive of the Irish name Aodh, meaning "fire" or "fiery"). In North America the name is most often given to boys, but has gradually become unisex.

== Notable people with the given name "Keegan" include ==
=== A ===
- Keegan Akin (born 1995), American baseball player
- Keegan Allan (born 2001), South African footballer
- Keegan Allen (born 1989), American actor

=== B ===
- Keegan Bradley (born 1986), American golfer
- Keegan Brooksby (born 1990), Australian rules footballer
- Keegan Brown (born 1992), English darts player

=== C ===
- Keegan Caldwell, American attorney
- Keegan Cook (born 1985), American volleyball coach
- Keegan Cox (born 2001),

Canadian Hockey Coach

=== D ===
- Keegan Daniel (born 1985), South African rugby player
- Keegan de Lancie (born 1984), American actor
- Keegan DeWitt (born 1982), American singer-songwriter

=== G ===
- Keegan Gaunt (born 2000), Canadian Paralympic runner
- Keegan Gerhard (born 1969), American pastry chef

=== H ===
- Keegan Hall (born 1983), American artist
- Keegan Hipgrave (born 1997), Australian rugby player
- Keegan Hirst (born 1988), British rugby player
- Keegan Hornblow (born 2001), New Zealand cyclist
- Keegan Hughes (born 2000), American soccer player

=== J ===
- Keegan Jelacic (born 2002), New Zealand-Australian footballer
- Keegan Joyce (born 1989), Australian actor and singer

=== K ===
- Keegan-Michael Key (born 1971), American actor
- Keegan Knott (born 2005), American Paralympic swimmer
- Keegan Kolesar (born 1997), Canadian ice hockey player
- Keegan Kuhn, American filmmaker

=== L ===
- Keegan Lester, American poet
- Keegan Linderboom (born 1989), New Zealand footballer
- Keegan Longueira (born 1991), South African author
- Keegan Lowe (born 1993), American-Canadian ice hockey player

=== M ===
- Keegan McHargue (born 1982), American artist
- Keegan Messing (born 1992), Canadian-American figure skater
- Keegan Meth (born 1988), Zimbabwean cricketer
- Keegan Meyer (born 1997), American soccer player
- Keegan Murray (born 2000), American basketball player

=== N ===
- Keegan Nash (born 1986), Australian soccer player

=== O ===
- Keegan Oates (born 2000), Australian cricketer
- Keegan O'Toole (born 2001), American wrestler

=== P ===
- Keegan Palmer (born 2003), Australian skateboarder
- Keegan Pereira (disambiguation), multiple people
- Keegan Petersen (born 1993), South African cricketer
- Keegan Phiri (born 1983), Zambian footballer

=== R ===
- Keegan Ritchie (born 1990), South African footballer
- Keegan Rosenberry (born 1993), American soccer player

=== S ===
- Keegan Shoemaker (born 2001), American football player
- Keegan Smith (disambiguation), multiple people
- Keegan Soehn (born 1992), Canadian gymnast
- Keegan Swenson (born 1994), American cyclist
- Keegan Swirbul (born 1995), American cyclist

=== T ===
- Keegan Taylor (1984–2013), Zimbabwean cricketer
- Keegan Thompson (born 1995), American baseball player
- Keegan Tingey (born 2000), American soccer player
- Keegan Connor Tracy (born 1971), Canadian actress and author

== Fictional characters ==
- Keegan Butcher-Baker, character in the BBC soap opera EastEnders
- Keegan P. Russ, character in the video games Call of Duty: Ghosts and Call of Duty: Mobile

== See also ==
- Keegan (surname), people with the surname "Keegan"
