= Cycling at the 2012 Summer Paralympics – Women's road time trial B =

Cycling, Women's road time trial B at the XIV Paralympic Games
- Venue: Brands Hatch
- Dates: September 5, 2012
- Competitors: 13 from 10 nations

Medalists
1st place, gold medalist(s)		Kathrin Goeken; Kim van Dijk	Netherlands
2nd place, silver medalist(s)		Phillipa Gray; Laura Thompson	New Zealand
3rd place, bronze medalist(s)		Catherine Walsh; Francine Meehan	Ireland

The Women's time trial B road cycling event at the 2012 Summer Paralympics took place on September 5 at Brands Hatch. Thirteen riders from ten different nations competed. The race distance was 24 km.

== Results ==
Rank	Name	Country	Time
1st place, gold medalist(s)	Kathrin Goeken; Pilot: Kim van Dijk	Netherlands	35:02.73
2nd place, silver medalist(s)	Phillipa Gray; Pilot: Laura Thompson	New Zealand	35:07.68
3rd place, bronze medalist(s)	Catherine Walsh; Pilot: Francine Meehan	Ireland	35:29.56
4	Robbi Weldon; Pilot: Lyne Bessette	Canada	35:47.94
5	Katie George Dunlevy; Pilot: Sandra Fitzgerald	Ireland	35:48.06
6	Josefa Benitez Guzman; Pilot: Maria Noriega	Spain	36:23.26
7	Lora Turnham; Pilot: Fiona Duncan	Great Britain	36:29.27
8	Genevieve Ouellet; Pilot: Emilie Roy	Canada	36:46.14
9	Joleen Hakker; Pilot: Samantha van Steenis	Netherlands	37:27.87
10	Martine Chaudier; Pilot: Laure Girard	France	38:16.05
11	Iryna Fiadotova; Pilot: Alena Drazdova	Belarus	38:21.40
12	Henrike Handrup; Pilot: Ellen Heiny	Germany	38:41.74
	Adamantia Chalkiadaki; Pilot: Argyro Milaki	Greece	DNF
