= Abu Dhabi T20 Trophy =

Cricket tournament

- Dates: 4 – 6 October 2018
- Administrator: Abu Dhabi Cricket
- Cricket format: Twenty20
- Tournament format(s): Round-robin and final
- Host: United Arab Emirates
- Champions: Lahore Qalandars (1st title)
- Participants: 6
- Matches: 7
- Most runs: Sohail Akhtar (Lahore Qalandars) (193)
- Most wickets: Raja Farzan (Lahore Qalandars) (6)
- Official website: abudhabit20.ae

The Abu Dhabi T20 Trophy was a 20-over cricket franchise tournament held in the United Arab Emirates. It took place between 4 and 6 October 2018 at the Sheikh Zayed Cricket Stadium. Six franchise teams took part in the first edition. The International Cricket Council (ICC) sanctioned the competition in June 2018.

Lahore Qalandars qualified for the final after winning both their games in Group A. The Titans from South Africa also qualified for the final after winning both their games in Group B. Lahore Qalandars won the title, after beating Titans by fifteen runs in the final.

== Teams and squads ==
The tournament featured the following teams:

- Boost Defenders – Shpageeza Cricket League, Afghanistan
- Hobart Hurricanes – Big Bash League, Australia
- Lahore Qalandars – Pakistan Super League
- Titans – Ram Slam T20 Challenge, South Africa
- Yorkshire Vikings – Twenty20 Cup, England
- Auckland Aces – Super Smash, New Zealand

The following squads were announced for the tournament.

Auckland Aces	Boost Defenders	Hobart Hurricanes	Lahore Qalandars	Titans	Yorkshire Vikings
Craig Cachopa (c); Finn Allen; Michael Barry; Jamie Brown; Graeme Beghin; Danru Ferns; Michael Guptill-Bunce; Ben Horne; Ben Lister; Matt McEwan; Robbie O'Donnell; Sean Solia; Will Somerville	Cameron Delport (c); Colin Ingram (vc); Kyle Abbott; Yamin Ahmadzai; Younas Ahmadzai; Rokhan Barakzai; Ronsford Beaton; Ben Cox; Noor-ul-Haq; Ryan Higgins; Munir Ahmad; Nijat Masood; Abdullah Mazari; Jeevan Mendis; Ramith Rambukwella; Hashmatullah Shahidi; Paul Stirling	Charlie Wakim (c); Johan Botha; Ben Duckett; Nathan Ellis; Jordan Clark; Caleb Jewell; Darren McNees; Lawrence Neil-Smith; Keegan Oates; Jerome Taylor; Jack White; Sean Willis; Mac Wright	Sohail Akhtar (c); Shaheen Afridi; Majid Ali; Shahzad Ali; Zulfiqar Babar; Bilal Irshad; Salman Irshad; Faizan Khan; Maaz Khan; Nuwan Kulasekara; Mitchell McClenaghan; Ahsan Jamil; Imran Nazir; Raja Farzan; Haris Rauf; Abdul Razzaq; Phil Salt; Agha Salman	Albie Morkel (c); Andrea Agathagelou; Farhaan Behardien; Henry Davids; Theunis de Bruyn; ~~Dean Elgar~~; Tony de Zorzi; Eldred Hawken; Heino Kuhn; Gregory Mahlokwana; Rivaldo Moonsamy; Tshepo Moreki; Chris Morris; Alfred Mothoa; Shaun von Berg	Steven Patterson (c); Adam Lyth (vc); Gary Ballance; Tim Bresnan; Harry Brook; Karl Carver; Ben Coad; Tom Kohler-Cadmore; Jack Leaning; Josh Poysden; Josh Shaw; Jonathan Tattersall; Jordan Thompson; Matthew Waite

Titans' Heino Kuhn replaced Dean Elgar as he was added in South Africa's squad for the Zimbabwe ODI series.

=== Group stage ===
The following fixtures were confirmed:

==== Group A ====
Team	Pld	W	L	NR	NRR	Pts
Lahore Qalandars	2	2	0	0	+1.34	4
Yorkshire Vikings	2	1	1	0	+1.57	2
Hobart Hurricanes	2	0	2	0	–2.85	0

4 October 2018
20:00 (D/N)
Scorecard

Yorkshire Vikings; 184/5 (20 overs)	v	Lahore Qalandars; 189/4 (19.4 overs)
Harry Brook 37 (25); Shaheen Afridi 2/36 (4 overs)		Sohail Akhtar 100 (79); Josh Poysden 2/26 (4 overs)

Lahore Qalandars won by 6 wickets
Sheikh Zayed Cricket Stadium, Abu Dhabi
Umpires: Iftikhar Ali (UAE) and Rabiul Hoque (UAE)
Player of the match: Sohail Akhtar (Lahore Qalandars)

- Lahore Qalandars won the toss and elected to field.
- Shahzad Ali, Raja Farzan and Faizan Khan (Lahore Qalandars) all made their T20 debuts.

5 October 2018
15:00 (D/N)
Scorecard

Lahore Qalandars; 175/6 (20 overs)	v	Hobart Hurricanes; 146/8 (20 overs)
Faizan Khan 83* (54); Jordan Clark 2/33 (4 overs)		Charlie Wakim 43 (36); Raja Farzan 4/24 (4 overs)

Lahore Qalandars won by 29 runs
Sheikh Zayed Cricket Stadium, Abu Dhabi
Umpires: Iftikhar Ali (UAE) and Rabiul Hoque (UAE)
Player of the match: Raja Farzan (Lahore Qalandars)

- Lahore Qalandars won the toss and elected to bat.
- Charlie Wakim, Sean Willis, Caleb Jewell, Mac Wright, Nathan Ellis, Lawrence Neil-Smith, Jack White (Hobart Hurricanes) and Haris Rauf (Lahore Qalandars) all made their T20 debuts.

6 October 2018
11:00
Scorecard

Hobart Hurricanes; 140/7 (20 overs)	v	Yorkshire Vikings; 144/1 (12.5 overs)
Caleb Jewell 38 (29); Karl Carver 2/29 (4 overs)		Tom Kohler-Cadmore 72* (42); Jordan Clark 1/25 (2.5 overs)

Yorkshire Vikings won by 9 wickets
Sheikh Zayed Cricket Stadium, Abu Dhabi
Umpires: Iftikhar Ali (UAE) and Ian Dixon (Zim)
Player of the match: Tom Kohler-Cadmore (Yorkshire Vikings)

- Hobart Hurricanes won the toss and elected to bat.

==== Group B ====
Team	Pld	W	L	NR	NRR	Pts
Titans	2	2	0	0	+2.35	4
Boost Defenders	2	1	1	0	–0.18	2
Auckland Aces	2	0	2	0	–2.08	0

4 October 2018
16:00 (D/N)
Scorecard

Boost Defenders; 205/5 (20 overs)	v	Auckland Aces; 170/5 (20 overs)
Colin Ingram 84* (47); William Somerville 2/28 (4 overs)		Robert O'Donnell 67* (46); Kyle Abbott 3/21 (4 overs)

Boost Defenders won by 35 runs
Sheikh Zayed Cricket Stadium, Abu Dhabi
Umpires: Akbar Ali (UAE) and Iftikhar Ali (UAE)
Player of the match: Colin Ingram (Boost Defenders)

- Auckland Aces won the toss and elected to field.
- Graeme Beghin and Jamie Brown (Auckland Aces) both made their T20 debuts.

5 October 2018
19:00 (D/N)
Scorecard

Titans; 218/3 (20 overs)	v	Boost Defenders; 168/8 (20 overs)
Tony de Zorzi 106* (57); Jeevan Mendis 1/38 (4 overs)		Colin Ingram 51 (29); Shaun von Berg 3/23 (4 overs)

Titans won by 50 runs
Sheikh Zayed Cricket Stadium, Abu Dhabi
Umpires: Akbar Ali (UAE) and Ian Dixon (Zim)
Player of the match: Tony de Zorzi (Titans)

- Boost Defenders won the toss and elected to field.
- Nijat Masood (Boost Defenders) made his T20 debut.

6 October 2018
15:00 (D/N)
Scorecard

Auckland Aces; 80 (16 overs)	v	Titans; 81/2 (12.1 overs)
Graeme Beghin 21 (16); Shaun von Berg 4/15 (4 overs)		Tony de Zorzi 34 (27); Michael Barry 1/10 (1 over)

Titans won by 8 wickets
Sheikh Zayed Cricket Stadium, Abu Dhabi
Umpires: Akbar Ali (UAE) and Ian Dixon (Zim)
Player of the match: Shaun von Berg (Titans)

- Titans won the toss and elected to field.

=== Final ===
6 October 2018
20:00 (D/N)
Scorecard

Lahore Qalandars; 148/6 (20 overs)	v	Titans; 133/6 (20 overs)
Sohail Akhtar 56 (47); Tshepo Moreki 3/33 (4 overs)		Heino Kuhn 37 (28); Maaz Khan 2/23 (4 overs)

Lahore Qalandars won by 15 runs
Sheikh Zayed Cricket Stadium, Abu Dhabi
Umpires: Akbar Ali (UAE) and Iftikhar Ali (UAE)
Player of the match: Shaheen Afridi (Lahore Qalandars)

- Titans won the toss and elected to field.
- Maaz Khan (Lahore Qalandars) made his T20 debut.
