= Cycling at the 2012 Summer Paralympics – Women's road race B =

Cycling, Women's road race B at the XIV Paralympic Games
- Venue: Brands Hatch
- Dates: September 8, 2012
- Competitors: 13 from 10 nations

Medalists
1st place, gold medalist(s)		Robbi Weldon; Lyne Bessette	Canada
2nd place, silver medalist(s)		Josefa Benitez Guzman; Maria Noriega	Spain
3rd place, bronze medalist(s)		Kathrin Goeken; Kim van Dijk	Netherlands

The Women's road race B event at the 2012 Summer Paralympics took place on September 8 at Brands Hatch. Thirteen riders from ten different nations competed. The race distance was 80 km.

== Results ==
DNF = Did Not Finish.

Rank	Name	Country	Time
1st place, gold medalist(s)	Robbi Weldon; Pilot: Lyne Bessette	Canada	2:08:26
2nd place, silver medalist(s)	Josefa Benitez Guzman; Pilot: Maria Noriega	Spain	2:08:59
3rd place, bronze medalist(s)	Kathrin Goeken; Pilot: Kim van Dijk	Netherlands	2:12:56
4	Genevieve Ouellet; Pilot: Emilie Roy	Canada	2:12:56
5	Katie George Dunlevy; Pilot: Sandra Fitzgerald	Ireland	2:12:56
6	Adamantia Chalkiadaki; Pilot: Argyro Milaki	Greece	2:12:56
7	Phillipa Gray; Pilot: Laura Thompson	New Zealand	2:12:56
8	Lora Turnham; Pilot: Fiona Duncan	Great Britain	2:13:00
9	Catherine Walsh; Pilot: Francine Meehan	Ireland	2:13:04
10	Martine Chaudier; Pilot: Laure Girard	France	2:15:42
11	Henrike Handrup; Pilot: Ellen Heiny	Germany	2:17:46
	Joleen Hakker; Pilot: Samantha van Steenis	Netherlands	DNF
	Iryna Fiadotova; Pilot: Alena Drazdova	Belarus	DNF
