= Kegan =

Kegan may refer to:

== People ==
=== Surname ===
- Elizabeth Hamer Kegan (1912–1979), American archivist and librarian
- Kübra Kegan (born 1995), Turkish volleyball player
- Robert Kegan (born 1946), American developmental psychologist

=== Given name ===
- Kegan Caull (born 2004), Saint Lucian footballer
- Kegan Johannes (born 2001), South African soccer player
- Charles Kegan Paul (1828–1902), or Kegan Paul, English author and publisher, and several publishing imprints bearing his name

== Places ==
- Kegan Lake, in Minnesota, U.S.

== See also ==
- Keegan (disambiguation)
