= 2027 United Cup =

International tennis tournament

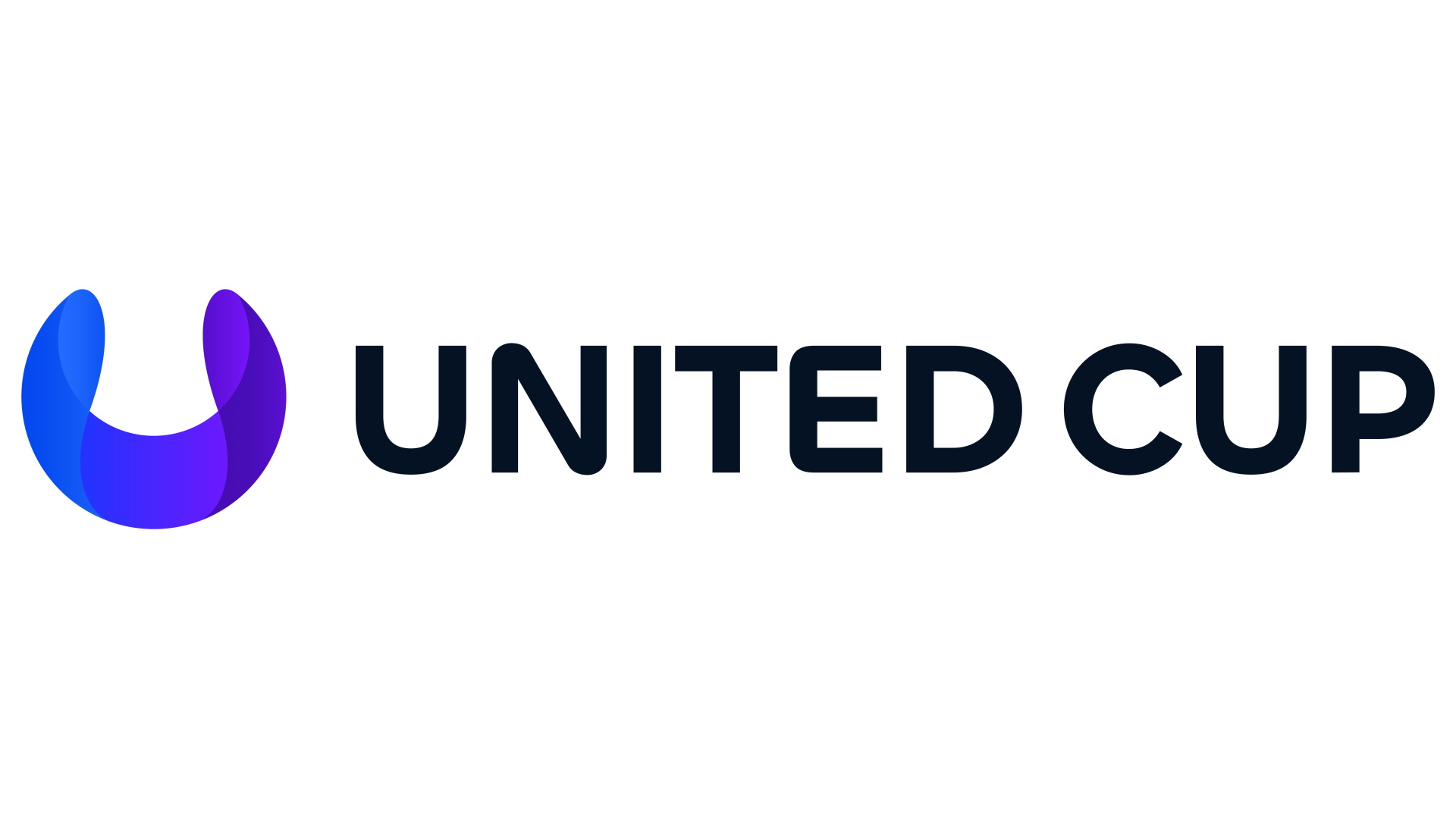
- Date: 1 – 10 January 2027
- Edition: 5th
- Category: United Cup
- Draw: 18 teams
- Prize money: US$12,000,000
- Surface: Hard / outdoor
- Location: Perth, Western Australia; Sydney, New South Wales; Australia
- Venue: RAC Arena; Ken Rosewall Arena
- United Cup

The 2027 United Cup will be the fifth edition of the United Cup, an international outdoor hard court mixed-gender team tennis tournament held by the Association of Tennis Professionals (ATP) and the Women's Tennis Association (WTA). Serving as the opener for the 2027 ATP Tour and the 2027 WTA Tour, it will be held from 1 to 11 January 2027 in Perth and Sydney. It will offer both ATP rankings and WTA rankings points to its players, up to a maximum of 500 points for undefeated champions.

== Format ==
Both cities will host three groups of three countries in a round-robin format. Each tie will consist of one men's and one women's singles match, and one mixed doubles match.

The six group winners and the best runner-up in each city will advance to the quarterfinals.

== Qualification ==
18 countries will qualify as follows:

- Five countries will qualify based on the ATP ranking of their number one ranked singles player.
- Five countries will qualify based on the WTA ranking of their number one ranked singles player.
- Eight countries will qualify based on the combined ranking of their number one ranked ATP and WTA players.

In exchange for being the host nation, Australia is guaranteed one of the spots reserved for teams with the best combined ranking if it fails to qualify on its own.

Teams will feature up to three players from each tour.

== Venues ==
Perth and Sydney will each host three groups of three countries in a round-robin format, as well as two quarterfinals. Sydney will host the semifinals and final on the last two days of the tournament.

| Image | Name | Opened | Capacity | Location | Events | Map |
|---|---|---|---|---|---|---|
| | RAC Arena | 2012 | 15,500 | Perth, Western Australia | Group stage, Quarterfinals | 2027 United Cup is located in Australia |
| | Ken Rosewall Arena | 1999 | 10,500 | Sydney, New South Wales | Group stage, Quarterfinals, Semifinals, Final | 2027 United Cup is located in Australia |

== ATP / WTA ranking points ==
=== ATP ===
| Round | Points per win vs. opponent ranked | | | | | | |
| Round | No. 1–10 | No. 11–20 | No. 21–30 | No. 31–50 | No. 51–100 | No. 101–250 | No. 251+ |
|---|---|---|---|---|---|---|---|
| Final | 180 | 140 | 120 | 90 | 60 | 40 | 35 |
| Semifinals | 130 | 105 | 90 | 60 | 40 | 35 | 25 |
| Quarterfinals | 80 | 65 | 55 | 40 | 35 | 25 | 20 |
| Group stage | 55 | 45 | 40 | 35 | 25 | 20 | 15 |

- Maximum 500 points

=== WTA ===
| Number of match wins | Ranking points |
|---|---|
| 5 match wins | 500 |
| 4 match wins | 325 |
| 3 match wins | 150 |
| 2 match wins (1 of 2 from QF, SF or F) | 108 |
| 2 match wins (round robin) | 90 |
| 1 match win (QF, SF or F) | 60 |
| 1 match win (round robin) | 32 |
| 0 match wins | 1 |

- Maximum 500 points

== Entries ==
18 countries qualified based on the ATP/WTA rankings on 9 November 2026 and players' commitment to play at the event. Ten qualified through the highest-ranked men's and women's players, while eight qualified based on combined team rankings. Australia was guaranteed entry either through rankings or a wildcard. Norway has missed direct entry for the first time since its iteration due to the qualification requirements having resulted a WTA player outside of the top 800 ranking.

| Seed | Nation | Crit. | No. 1 ATP | Rank | No. 1 WTA | Rank | No. 2 ATP | No. 2 WTA | Doubles ATP | Doubles WTA | Captain | Nat. |
|---|---|---|---|---|---|---|---|---|---|---|---|---|
| 1 | United States | ATP #1 | Ben Shelton | 4 | Coco Gauff | 4 | Keegan Smith | Varvara Lepchenko | Christian Harrison | Nicole Melichar-Martinez | | (United States) |
| 2 | Czech Republic | WTA #1 | Jiří Lehečka | 15 | Linda Nosková | 8 | Dalibor Svrčina | Laura Samson | Petr Nouza | Jesika Malečková | | (Czech Republic) |
| 3 | Canada | ATP #5 | Félix Auger-Aliassime | 14 | Victoria Mboko | 21 | Alexis Galarneau | Kayla Cross | Cleeve Harper | Gabriela Dabrowski | | (Canada) |
| 4 | France | ATP #3 | Arthur Fils | 7 | Diane Parry | 34 | Geoffrey Blancaneaux | Léolia Jeanjean | Manuel Guinard | Fiona Ferro (Note: 3rd singles player instead of doubles) | | (France) |
| 5 | Poland | WTA #2 | Hubert Hurkacz | 30 | Maja Chwalińska | 12 | Kacper Żuk | Martyna Kubka | Jan Zieliński | Katarzyna Piter | | (Poland) |
| 6 | Belgium | WTA #3 | Alexander Blockx | 28 | Elise Mertens | 14 | Gauthier Onclin | Polina Bakhmutkina | Sander Gillé | Magali Kempen | | (Belgium) |
| 7 | Greece | WTA #5 | Stefanos Tsitsipas | 36 | Maria Sakkari | 29 | Ioannis Xilas | Despina Papamichail | — | Sapfo Sakellaridi | | (Greece) |
| 8 | Spain | ATP #4 | Rafael Jódar | 11 | Paula Badosa | 57 | Nikolás Sánchez Izquierdo | Leyre Romero Gormaz | Benjamín Winter López | Yvonne Cavallé Reimers | | (Spain) |
| 9 | Italy | ATP #2 | Flavio Cobolli | 6 | Elisabetta Cocciaretto | 74 | Andrea Pellegrino | Nuria Brancaccio | Filippo Romano | Angelica Moratelli | | (Italy) |
| 10 | Australia | Comb #3 | Rinky Hijikata | 59 | Talia Gibson | 36 | Alex Bolt | Daria Saville | Marc Polmans | Ellen Perez | | (Australia) |
| 11 | Croatia | Comb #4 | Dino Prižmić | 89 | Donna Vekić | 39 | Matej Dodig | Lucija Ćirić Bagarić | Mate Pavić | — | | (Croatia) |
| 12 | Germany | Comb #5 | Yannick Hanfmann | 67 | Tamara Korpatsch | 62 | Florian Broska | Mona Barthel | Kevin Krawietz | Mina Hodzic | | (Germany) |
| 13 | Argentina | Comb #6 | Tomas Martin Etcheverry | 29 | Solana Sierra | 106 | Mariano Kestelboim | Jazmín Ortenzi | Guido Andreozzi | Nicole Fossa Huergo | | (Argentina) |
| 14 | Hungary | Comb #7 | Fábián Marozsán | 63 | Anna Bondár | 76 | Zsombor Piros | Panna Udvardy | — | Fanny Stollár | | (Hungary) |
| 15 | Great Britain | Comb #1 | Arthur Fery | 33 | Emma Raducanu | 38^{(PR)107} | Jan Choinski | Francesca Jones | Neal Skupski | Olivia Nicholls | | (United Kingdom) |
| 16 | Switzerland | WTA #4 | Jérôme Kym | 143 | Belinda Bencic | 20 | Leandro Riedi | Susan Bandecchi | Jakub Paul | Naïma Karamoko | | (Switzerland) |
| 17 | Kazakhstan | Comb #8 | Alexander Shevchenko | 107 | Yulia Putintseva | 66 | Dmitry Popko | Zhibek Kulambayeva | — | — | | (Kazakhstan) |
| 18 | Denmark | Comb #2 | Holger Rune | 14^{(PR)406} | Clara Tauson | 58 | Elmer Møller | Emma Kampér | Johannes Ingildsen | — | | (Denmark) |

=== Withdrawals ===
| Seed | Nation | Ass. | Player | Rank | Reason |

- Singles rankings are as of 9 November 2026
- PR = Protected ranking

== Group stage ==
| Qualified for the knockout stage (**in bold**) |
| Eliminated (in italics) |

=== Overview ===
G = Group, T = Ties, M = Matches, S = Sets

| G | Winner | | | | Runner-up | | | | Third | | | |
| G | Country | T | M | S | Country | T | M | S | Country | T | M | S |
|---|---|---|---|---|---|---|---|---|---|---|---|---|
| A | United States | | | | Croatia | | | | Kazakhstan | | | |
| B | Czech Republic | | | | Greece | | | | Hungary | | | |
| C | Canada | | | | Italy | | | | Denmark | | | |
| D | France | | | | Australia | | | | Great Britain | | | |
| E | Poland | | | | Germany | | | | Switzerland | | | |
| F | Belgium | | | | Spain | | | | Argentina | | | |

=== Group A ===
Host city: Perth

| Pos. | Country | Ties W–L | Matches W–L | Sets W–L | Games W–L |
|---|---|---|---|---|---|
| 1 | United States | | | | |
| 2 | Croatia | | | | |
| 3 | Kazakhstan | | | | |

==== Croatia vs. Kazakhstan ====
Croatia

RAC Arena
1 January 2027

Kazakhstan

| | | | 1 | 2 | 3 |
|---|---|---|---|---|---|
| 1 | (Croatia) (Kazakhstan) | Dino Prižmić; Yulia Putintseva |
| 2 | (Croatia) (Kazakhstan) | Donna Vekić; Alexander Shevchenko |
| 3 | (Croatia) (Kazakhstan) | Mate Pavić / Donna Vekić; Alexander Shevchenko / Yulia Putintseva |

==== United States vs. Kazakhstan ====
United States

RAC Arena
2 January 2027

Kazakhstan

| | | | 1 | 2 | 3 |
|---|---|---|---|---|---|
| 1 | (United States) (Kazakhstan) | Coco Gauff; Yulia Putintseva |
| 2 | (United States) (Kazakhstan) | Ben Shelton; Alexander Shevchenko |
| 3 | (United States) (Kazakhstan) | Christian Harrison / Nicole Melichar-Martinez; Alexander Shevchenko / Yulia Putintseva |

==== United States vs. Croatia ====
United States

RAC Arena
4 January 2027

Croatia

| | | | 1 | 2 | 3 |
|---|---|---|---|---|---|
| 1 | (United States) (Croatia) | Ben Shelton; Dino Prižmić |
| 2 | (United States) (Croatia) | Coco Gauff; Donna Vekić |
| 3 | (United States) (Croatia) | Christian Harrison / Nicole Melichar-Martinez; Mate Pavić / Donna Vekić |

=== Group B ===
Host city: Sydney

| Pos. | Country | Ties W–L | Matches W–L | Sets W–L | Games W–L |
|---|---|---|---|---|---|
| 1 | Czech Republic | | | | |
| 2 | Greece | | | | |
| 3 | Hungary | | | | |

==== Czechia vs. Greece ====
Czech Republic

Ken Rosewall Arena
2 January 2027

Greece

| | | | 1 | 2 | 3 |
|---|---|---|---|---|---|
| 1 | (Czech Republic) (Greece) | Linda Nosková; Maria Sakkari |
| 2 | (Czech Republic) (Greece) | Jiří Lehečka; Stefanos Tsitsipas |
| 3 | (Czech Republic) (Greece) | Petr Nouza / Jesika Malečková; Stefanos Tsitsipas / Sapfo Sakellaridi |

==== Czechia vs. Hungary ====
Czech Republic

Ken Rosewall Arena
4 January 2027

Hungary

| | | | 1 | 2 | 3 |
|---|---|---|---|---|---|
| 1 | (Czech Republic) (Hungary) | Jiří Lehečka; Fábián Marozsán |
| 2 | (Czech Republic) (Hungary) | Linda Nosková; Anna Bondár |
| 3 | (Czech Republic) (Hungary) | Petr Nouza / Jesika Malečková; Fábián Marozsán / Fanny Stollár |

==== Greece vs. Hungary ====
Greece

Ken Rosewall Arena
5 January 2027

Hungary

| | | | 1 | 2 | 3 |
|---|---|---|---|---|---|
| 1 | (Greece) (Hungary) | Maria Sakkari; Anna Bondár |
| 2 | (Greece) (Hungary) | Stefanos Tsitsipas; Fábián Marozsán |
| 3 | (Greece) (Hungary) | Stefanos Tsitsipas / Sapfo Sakellaridi; Fábián Marozsán / Fanny Stollár |

=== Group C ===
Host city: Perth

| Pos. | Country | Ties W–L | Matches W–L | Sets W–L | Games W–L |
|---|---|---|---|---|---|
| 1 | Canada | | | | |
| 2 | Italy | | | | |
| 3 | Denmark | | | | |

==== Italy vs. Denmark ====
Italy

RAC Arena
2 January 2027

Denmark

| | | | 1 | 2 | 3 |
|---|---|---|---|---|---|
| 1 | (Italy) (Denmark) | Elisabetta Cocciaretto; Clara Tauson |
| 2 | (Italy) (Denmark) | Flavio Cobolli; Holger Rune |
| 3 | (Italy) (Denmark) | Filippo Romano / Angelica Moratelli; Johannes Ingildsen / Clara Tauson |

==== Canada vs. Italy ====
Canada

RAC Arena
3 January 2027

Italy

| | | | 1 | 2 | 3 |
|---|---|---|---|---|---|
| 1 | (Canada) (Italy) | Victoria Mboko; Elisabetta Cocciaretto |
| 2 | (Canada) (Italy) | Félix Auger-Aliassime; Flavio Cobolli |
| 3 | (Canada) (Italy) | Cleeve Harper / Gabriela Dabrowski; Filippo Romano / Angelica Moratelli |

==== Canada vs. Denmark ====
Canada

RAC Arena
5 January 2027

Denmark

| | | | 1 | 2 | 3 |
|---|---|---|---|---|---|
| 1 | (Canada) (Denmark) | Victoria Mboko; Clara Tauson |
| 2 | (Canada) (Denmark) | Félix Auger-Aliassime; Holger Rune |
| 3 | (Canada) (Denmark) | Cleeve Harper / Gabriela Dabrowski; Johannes Ingildsen / Clara Tauson |

=== Group D ===
Host city: Sydney

| Pos. | Country | Ties W–L | Matches W–L | Sets W–L | Games W–L |
|---|---|---|---|---|---|
| 1 | France | | | | |
| 2 | Australia | | | | |
| 3 | Great Britain | | | | |

==== France vs. Great Britain ====
France

Ken Rosewall Arena
2 January 2027

Great Britain

| | | | 1 | 2 | 3 |
|---|---|---|---|---|---|
| 1 | (France) (United Kingdom) | Diane Parry; Emma Raducanu |
| 2 | (France) (United Kingdom) | Arthur Fils; Arthur Fery |
| 3 | (France) (United Kingdom) | Manuel Guinard / Fiona Ferro; Neal Skupski / Olivia Nicholls |

==== Australia vs. Great Britain ====
Australia

Ken Rosewall Arena
3 January 2027

Great Britain

| | | | 1 | 2 | 3 |
|---|---|---|---|---|---|
| 1 | (Australia) (United Kingdom) | Talia Gibson; Emma Raducanu |
| 2 | (Australia) (United Kingdom) | Rinky Hijikata; Arthur Fery |
| 3 | (Australia) (United Kingdom) | Marc Polmans / Ellen Perez; Neal Skupski / Olivia Nicholls |

==== France vs. Australia ====
France

Ken Rosewall Arena
6 January 2027

Australia

| | | | 1 | 2 | 3 |
|---|---|---|---|---|---|
| 1 | (France) (Australia) | Diane Parry; Talia Gibson |
| 2 | (France) (Australia) | Arthur Fery; Rinky Hijikata |
| 3 | (France) (Australia) | Manuel Guinard / Fiona Ferro; Marc Polmans / Ellen Perez |

=== Group E ===
Host city: Perth

| Pos. | Country | Ties W–L | Matches W–L | Sets W–L | Games W–L |
|---|---|---|---|---|---|
| 1 | Poland | | | | |
| 2 | Germany | | | | |
| 3 | Switzerland | | | | |

==== Poland vs. Switzerland ====
Poland

RAC Arena
1 January 2027

Switzerland

| | | | 1 | 2 | 3 |
|---|---|---|---|---|---|
| 1 | (Poland) (Switzerland) | Maja Chwalińska; Belinda Bencic |
| 2 | (Poland) (Switzerland) | Hubert Hurkacz; Jérôme Kym |
| 3 | (Poland) (Switzerland) | Jan Zieliński / Katarzyna Piter; Jakub Paul / Naima Karamoko |

==== Germany vs. Switzerland ====
Germany

RAC Arena
3 January 2027

Switzerland

| | | | 1 | 2 | 3 |
|---|---|---|---|---|---|
| 1 | (Germany) (Switzerland) | Yannick Hanfmann; Jérôme Kym |
| 2 | (Germany) (Switzerland) | Tamara Korpatsch; Belinda Bencic |
| 3 | (Germany) (Switzerland) | Kevin Krawietz / Tamara Korpatsch; Jakub Paul / Naima Karamoko |

==== Poland vs. Germany ====
Poland

RAC Arena
4 January 2027

Germany

| | | | 1 | 2 | 3 |
|---|---|---|---|---|---|
| 1 | (Poland) (Germany) | Hubert Hurkacz; Yannick Hanfmann |
| 2 | (Poland) (Germany) | Maja Chwalińska; Tamara Korpatsch |
| 3 | (Poland) (Germany) | Jan Zieliński / Katarzyna Piter; Kevin Krawietz / Tamara Korpatsch |

=== Group F ===
Host city: Sydney

| Pos. | Country | Ties W–L | Matches W–L | Sets W–L | Games W–L |
|---|---|---|---|---|---|
| 1 | Belgium | | | | |
| 2 | Spain | | | | |
| 3 | Argentina | | | | |

==== Belgium vs. Argentina ====
Belgium

Ken Rosewall Arena
3 January 2027

Argentina

| | | | 1 | 2 | 3 |
|---|---|---|---|---|---|
| 1 | (Belgium) (Argentina) | Alexander Blockx; Tomas Martin Etcheverry |
| 2 | (Belgium) (Argentina) | Elise Mertens; Solana Sierra |
| 3 | (Belgium) (Argentina) | Sander Gillé / Magali Kempen; Guido Andreozzi / Nicole Fossa Huergo |

==== Spain vs. Argentina ====
Spain

Ken Rosewall Arena
4 January 2027

Argentina

| | | | 1 | 2 | 3 |
|---|---|---|---|---|---|
| 1 | (Spain) (Argentina) | Paula Badosa; Solana Sierra |
| 2 | (Spain) (Argentina) | Rafael Jódar; Tomas Martin Etcheverry |
| 3 | (Spain) (Argentina) | Benjamin Winter López / Yvonne Cavallé Reimers; Guido Andreozzi / Nicole Fossa Huergo |

==== Belgium vs. Spain ====
Belgium

Ken Rosewall Arena
6 January 2027

Spain

| | | | 1 | 2 | 3 |
|---|---|---|---|---|---|
| 1 | (Belgium) (Spain) | Elise Mertens; Paula Badosa |
| 2 | (Belgium) (Spain) | Alexander Blockx; Rafael Jódar |
| 3 | (Belgium) (Spain) | Sander Gillé / Magali Kempen; Benjamin Winter López / Yvonne Cavallé Reimers |

== Knockout stage ==
=== Bracket ===
Quarterfinals
6 January – Perth
Group A winner
Best Perth runner-up
6 January – Perth
Group C winner
Group E winner
7 January – Sydney
Group B winner
Best Sydney runner-up
8 January – Sydney
Group D winner
Group F winner

Semifinals
9 January – Sydney
9 January – Sydney

Final
10 January – Sydney

=== Quarterfinals ===
==== Group A winner vs. Best Perth runner-up ====
[[|]]

Perth, RAC Arena
6 January 2027

[[|]]

| | 1 | 2 | 3 |
|---|---|---|---|
| 1 |
| 2 |
| 3 |

==== Group C winner vs. Group E winner ====
[[|]]

Perth, RAC Arena
6 January 2027

[[|]]

| | 1 | 2 | 3 |
|---|---|---|---|
| 1 |
| 2 |
| 3 |

==== Group B winner vs. Best Sydney runner-up ====
[[|]]

Sydney, Ken Rosewall Arena
7 January 2027

[[|]]

| | 1 | 2 | 3 |
|---|---|---|---|
| 1 |
| 2 |
| 3 |

==== Group D winner vs. Group F winner ====
[[|]]

Sydney, Ken Rosewall Arena
8 January 2027

[[|]]

| | 1 | 2 | 3 |
|---|---|---|---|
| 1 |
| 2 |
| 3 |

=== Semifinals ===
==== vs. ====
[[|]]

Sydney, Ken Rosewall Arena
9 January 2027

[[|]]

| | 1 | 2 | 3 |
|---|---|---|---|
| 1 |
| 2 |
| 3 |

==== vs. ====
[[|]]

Sydney, Ken Rosewall Arena
9 January 2027

[[|]]

| | 1 | 2 | 3 |
|---|---|---|---|
| 1 |
| 2 |
| 3 |

=== Final ===
==== vs. ====
[[|]]

Sydney, Ken Rosewall Arena
10 January 2027

[[|]]

| | 1 | 2 | 3 |
|---|---|---|---|
| 1 |
| 2 |
| 3 |
