= Caldwell Law =

- Headquarters: Boston, Massachusetts, U.S.
- No. of offices: 3
- Major practice areas: Intellectual property, mergers and acquisitions, corporate law, litigation
- Date founded: 2016
- Founder: Keegan Caldwell
- Website: caldwelllaw.com

Caldwell Law, formerly known as Caldwell Intellectual Property Law, is a Boston-based law firm focused on intellectual property law, mergers and acquisitions, litigation, and corporate law. The firm is headquartered in Boston, Massachusetts, and has offices in Los Angeles and London.

== History ==
Caldwell was founded in 2016 by Keegan Caldwell. In 2021, the firm was included on the Inc. 5000 list of fastest-growing private companies. After the ranking, the firm reported receiving correspondence from incarcerated individuals seeking patent assistance, giving rise to the firm's formal pro bono program.

In 2021, Caldwell expanded by opening offices in Santa Monica, California. The firm later merged with Los Angeles-based boutique Palisades Patent Law.

In 2026, Reuters reported that Caldwell represents Solos Technology Ltd. in a patent infringement lawsuit filed against Meta Platforms and EssilorLuxottica involving smart-glasses technology used in Ray-Ban Meta products.

== Offices ==
- Boston, Massachusetts — headquarters
- Los Angeles, California
- London, United Kingdom

== Awards and rankings ==
Inc. Magazine: Named to the Inc. 5000 for six consecutive years; Inc. Best in Business (Legal, 2021–2022; Business Services, 2023); Inc. Regionals: Northeast.

IAM Patent 1000: Keegan Caldwell recognized as a leading patent practitioner in 2024 and 2025.

== Pro bono work ==
Caldwell operates the Incarcerated Innovators Program, which provides patent prosecution assistance to incarcerated and formerly incarcerated individuals. The program has been covered by Inc. Magazine and Law360 which reported on the firm's work assisting incarcerated and formerly incarcerated inventors.

The firm also operates a charitable initiative called Caldwell Cares. The initiative was mentioned by Fast Company in connection with its 2022 World Changing Ideas Awards.

== Key people ==
Keegan Caldwell is the founder and Global Managing Partner of Caldwell.

== See also ==
- Intellectual property law
- Patent law
- Law firm
