= Keegan =

Keegan may refer to:

- Keegan (given name)
- Keegan (surname)
- Keegan or Mac Aodhagáin, Irish Gaelic clan of lawyers
