= Kathrin Goeken =

Dutch Paralympic cyclist

Personal information
- Born: 24 December 1979 (age 46)

Sport
- Country: Netherlands
- Sport: Cycling
Medal record
Paralympic Games
Gold medal – first place	2012 London	Road time trial B
Bronze medal – third place	2012 London	Road race B

Kathrin Goeken (born 24 December 1979) is a visually impaired Dutch Paralympic cyclist. She represented the Netherlands at the 2012 Summer Paralympics held in London, United Kingdom and she won one gold medal and one bronze medal.

Together with her pilot Kim van Dijk, she won the gold medal in the women's road time trial B event and the bronze medal in the women's road race B event.

In 2012, she also received the Order of Orange-Nassau decoration.
