= Robbi Weldon =

Canadian Paralympic athlete (born 1975)

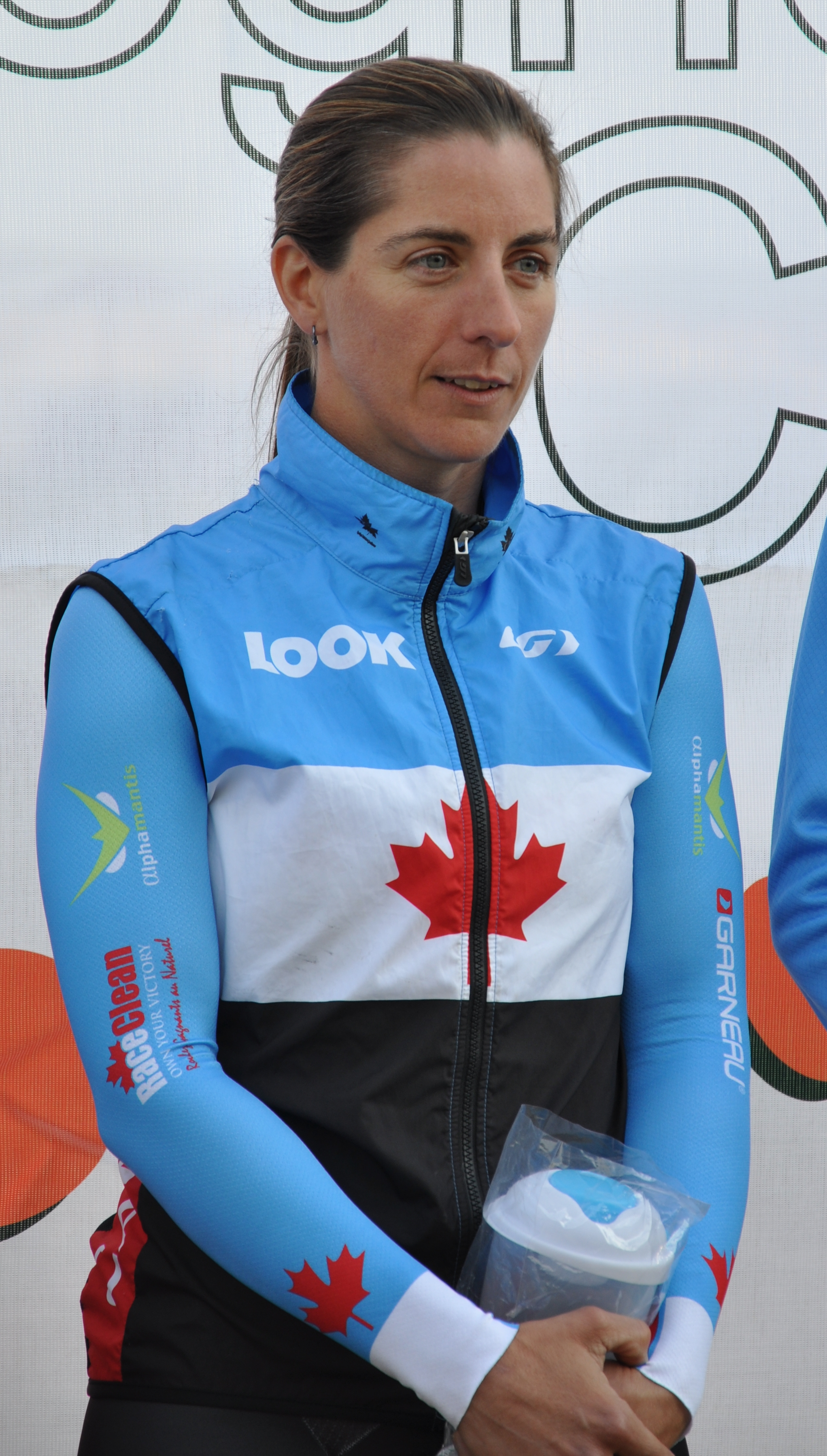

Personal information
- Nationality: Canadian
- Born: 6 September 1975 (age 51)
- Height: 168 cm (5 ft 6 in)
- Weight: 65 kg (143 lb)
- Other interests: Hiking, Camping

Sport
- Country: Canada
- Sport: Paralympic Nordic skiing and Para-Cycling
- Disability class: B2
Medal record
Women's para cycling
Representing Canada
Paralympic Games
Gold medal – first place	2012 London	Road Race
Parapan American Games
Gold medal – first place	2011 Guadalajara	Road Race
Gold medal – first place	2011 Guadalajara	Time Trial - Visually Impaired
Gold medal – first place	2011 Guadalajara	1km Time Trial
Gold medal – first place	2011 Guadalajara	3000m Individual Pursuit
Gold medal – first place	2015 Toronto	Mixed Time Trial B
Para-cycling Worlds
Silver medal – second place	2010 Baie-Comeau	Time Trial
- Updated on 27 September 2014

Robbi Weldon (born 6 September 1975) is a Canadian visually impaired Paralympic Nordic skier and Para-cyclist who has competed in the 2010 Winter Paralympics, 2014 Winter Paralympics and in the 2012 Summer Paralympics. She has also participated in the 2011 Guadalajara Parapan Ams. She won five medals, all of which are all gold.

Weldon started skiing at the age of three and in 2010, she started Para-Cycling. Her guide for Para-Cycling is Lyne Bessette and her guide for Para-Skiing is Phil Wood.

== Personal life ==
Weldon was born on 6 September 1975 in Thunder Bay and now lives in Ottawa. She started downhill skiing at the age of three. She was diagnosed with Stargardt disease in 1990 at the age of 15, affecting her central vision. Weldon took up the sport of Para-Nordic skiing in 2002, and in 2010 she took up the sport of Para-cycling after attending a Western Canada Development Camp.

She is a mother of two children which Weldon took with her when competing in the 2012 London Paralympics. She hopes that the trip would inspire them. "My children have benefited greatly from my lifestyle of physical activity and being healthy... meeting para-athletes that are competing at an elite level and are so inspirational." Weldon said. Her daughter, Keegan Gaunt, is a para-athletics middle-distance runner.

== Career ==
Weldon did not win any medals in skiing at the 2010 Winter Paralympics but was "thrilled" by the experience.

At the 2011 Parapan American Games, Weldon participated in para-cycling and won four gold medals with guide Lyne Bessette. They won gold at the Mixed Time Trial, Women's Road Race, Women's individual track pursuit, and the Women's 1 Kilometre Time. She said that "it's very helpful having Lyne. She is such an experienced cyclist and she has taught me a lot." The pair had also been selected to be the flag bearers at the closing ceremony.

Weldon and guide Bessette won one gold medal in the 2012 London Paralympics, in the Cycling at the 80-kilometre road race. They finished with a time of 2:08:26, 33 seconds ahead of Josefa Guzman Benitez and guide Maria Noriega. After the competition, Weldon said "I am very happy. Lyne and I are thrilled about this golden performance... We had respect for everyone."

Weldon competed at the 2014 Winter Paralympics with Phil Wood as guide. It was the pair's first championship together but they did not win any medals. Wood said that "Skiing as a team when done well can add 10 to 15 per cent improvement in a single performance."
