= Keegan Lester =

American poet

Keegan Lester is an American poet born in Huntington Beach, California. He earned his BA from West Virginia University and his MFA in poetry from the Columbia University School of the Arts.

== Career ==
Lester's collection of poetry This shouldn't be Beautiful but it was & it was all I had, so I drew it won the 15th annual Slope Editions Book Prize judged by Mary Ruefle and was published Feb 8th, 2017 through Slope Editions. He is the co-founder and poetry editor for the journal Souvenir Lit.

Lester has taught creative writing, both poetry and non-fiction, through multiple writing workshops in Morgantown, West Virginia, as well as the West Virginia Young Writers' Holiday and mentors for the Adroit Journal Summer High School Mentorship Program.

At West Virginia University he was a writing center tutor for three years and a tutor for the WVU Men's Soccer & Woman's Basketball teams. During graduate school he co-founded the Brooklyn reading series MetroRhythm, which has included readers Mark Strand, Meghan O’Rourke, Dorothea Lasky, Mark Bibbins, among others, and has collaborated with various organizations, including Argos Books and Ugly Duckling Presse. Metro Rhythm participated in 2011 and 2012 with Brooklyn's POPSICKLE Festival, as well as the New York City Poetry Festival.

Lester's work appears or is forthcoming from: The Boston Review, CutBank, The Journal, The Adroit Journal, Sixth Finch, BOAAT, and The Atlas Review among others and has been featured on NPR, Coldfront and the New School writing blog.

== Summer tours ==
Beginning in 2015 he's toured a week each summer in West Virginia, as a member of the Travelin’ Appalachians Revue, billed as a "multi-disciplinary celebration of Appalachian music and creative writing." The Travelin’ Appalachians Revue is meant to explore and challenge the complex and competing narratives about West Virginia with lived experience and compassion for their community to highlight the art, music and writing of that state" the brainchild of Howard Parsons and Tyler Grady. Others participating on the tour have included been David F. Bello of the band The World is a Beautiful Place and I Am No Longer Afraid to Die, John R. Miller, and writers Scott McClanahan, Juliet Escoria, Marie Manilla, as well as West Virginia broadcasting producer of Inside Appalachia, Roxy Todd and activist and writer Crystal Good.

== Book tour ==
In early 2017, in support of his book, he toured 23 dates across the northeast starting in Provincetown, heading as far north as Cambridge then turning south. Lester was accompanied by fiction writer Sam Farahmand and poet Isabelle Shepherd, and read with many writers along the way including: Edaurdo Corral, Tina Cane, Paige Lewis, Kaveh Akbar, Ching-In Chen, Earl Braggs, George Conley, Sybil Baker, Molly Brodak, Nicole Steinberg, Raquel Salas Rivera, Laura Kochman, Joe Halestead, Artress Bethany White, Prairie M. Faul, jo gehringer and Sarah Gerard among others.
