= Keegan Hall =

American artist

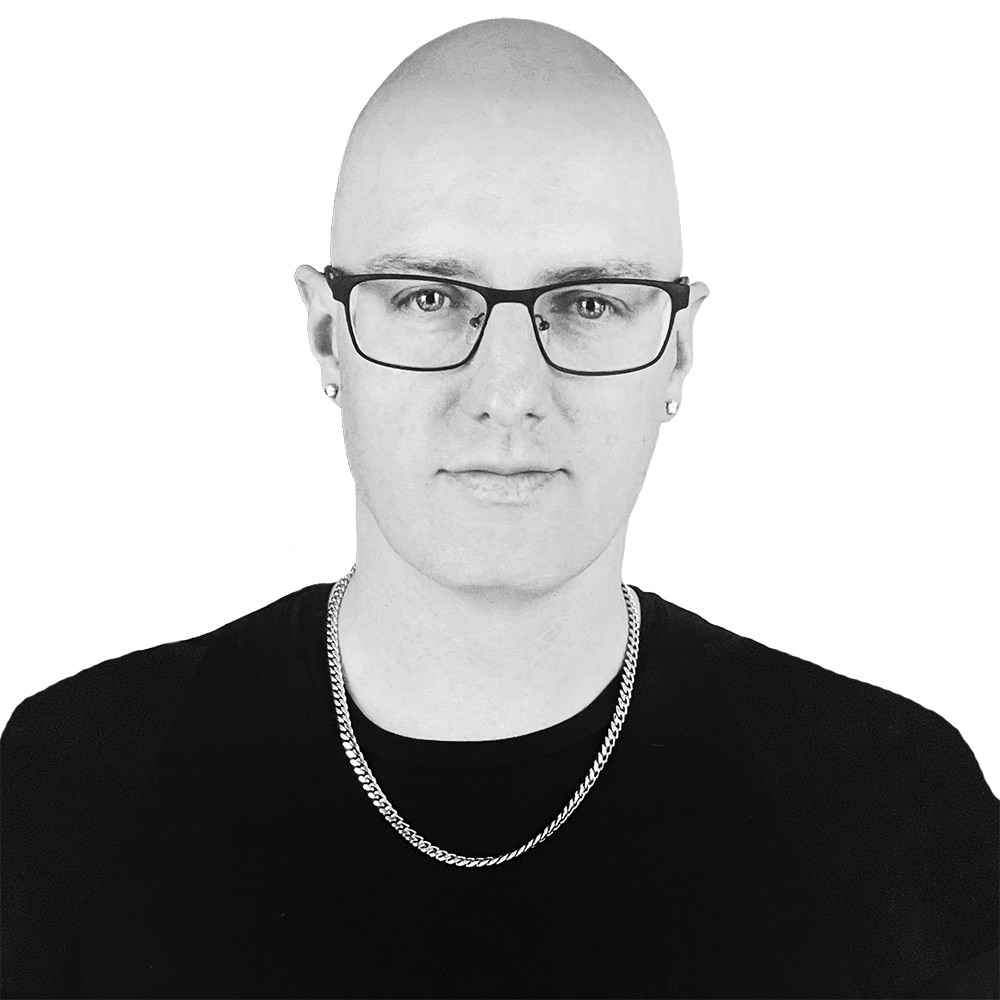
- Born: May 16, 1981 (age 45); Seattle, Washington, US
- Education: University of Washington (BA in Art in 2003, and MBA in 2010)
- Occupation: Artist
- Spouse: Ioana Hall (married 2004)
- Children: Payton Hall
- Website: keeganhall.com

Keegan Hall is an American artist known for large-scale, photorealistic graphite drawings of prominent figures in sports, music, and public life and quickly became the favorite artist of many stars and celebrities. Working primarily with a mechanical pencil, Hall creates highly detailed compositions that can require hundreds of hours to complete. He returned to art in 2015 following the unexpected passing of his mother. Prior to returning to art, Hall was involved with multiple successful startups.

Hall's subjects and collaborators have included Michael Jordan, Rory McIlroy, Barack and Michelle Obama, Eddie Vedder, Dave Grohl, Russell Wilson, Kobe Bryant, Giannis Antetokounmpo, and other athletes, musicians, and public figures. He has also produced artwork for professional sports organizations, universities, nonprofit organizations, and Topps.

In 2026, Hall completed a drawing commemorating Rory McIlroy's victory at the 2025 Masters Tournament and completion of the career Grand Slam. McIlroy gifted the original drawing to Augusta National Golf Club, and McIlroy and Hall signed a limited collection of prints produced for the club's membership.

Hall's artwork has also been used in charitable campaigns that have raised hundreds of thousands of dollars for nonprofit and community organizations.

== Early life and education ==
Hall grew up in Sumner, Washington, small city south of Seattle, where he spent the majority of his childhood living in a trailer park. As a child, he hoped to become an animator and later studied art at the University of Washington (UW). While a student, he was selected for the university's Studio Art Program in Rome.

Hall earned an undergraduate degree in Interdisciplinary Visual Arts from UW in 2003. He later earned a Master of Business Administration from UW and worked in professional sports, technology, and startup companies before returning to art.

== Return to art ==
According to NBC's Today Show, Hall started drawing again following the expected death of his mother. Previous to that moment, he had not drawn in nearly 10 years. Hall has said that his mother's support of his artistic ambitions influenced his decision to begin drawing again. Hall quickly became the favorite artist of many stars and celebrities.

One of his first drawings was of Seattle Seahawks Kam Chancellor and, after Kam spotted the drawing on social media, he reached out to Hall to commission an original drawing. That exposure led to another friend wanting to give a Hall original to Seattle Mariners pitcher Félix Hernández, and then his first ever charity project with Seattle Seahawks cornerback Richard Sherman.

Hall subsequently left his startup career to work as a professional artist.

== Artistic career ==
Hall specializes in photorealistic drawings created primarily with graphite on paper. His work is characterized by detailed rendering of faces, clothing, reflected light, architecture, and large crowds.

He typically begins with a lightly constructed composition and gradually develops the image through repeated layers of graphite. Hall has compared the process to assembling a puzzle and moving across the paper like a typewriter, repeatedly refining individual sections until the image is complete.

Many of his larger works require several months and hundreds of hours to produce. Hall generally uses a mechanical pencil with 0.5-millimeter graphite lead, along with precision erasers and other drawing tools.

His drawings frequently document important moments in sports and popular culture. Subjects have included basketball players Michael Jordan, Kobe Bryant, Giannis Antetokounmpo, and Sue Bird; musicians Eddie Vedder, Dave Grohl, and Macklemore and Ryan Lewis; football players Russell Wilson and Richard Sherman; and public figures including Barack and Michelle Obama.

== Michael Jordan works ==
Hall gained widespread online attention for a graphite drawing depicting Michael Jordan's free-throw-line dunk during the 1988 NBA Slam Dunk Contest. The composition included hundreds of individually rendered spectators and received more than 282,000 upvotes after Hall shared it on Reddit.

After seeing the drawing, Jordan commissioned Hall to create another original work. Hall later delivered the completed drawing to Jordan at Grove XXIII, Jordan's private golf club in Florida.

The project led Jordan's representatives to introduce Hall to professional golfer Rory McIlroy, who had also seen Hall's Jordan drawing.

== Rory McIlroy and Augusta National ==
Hall's first project commissioned by Rory McIlroy depicted McIlroy and his caddie, Harry Diamond, following McIlroy's victory at the 2022 CJ Cup at Congaree Golf Club.

After McIlroy won the 2025 Masters Tournament and completed the career Grand Slam, his representatives commissioned Hall to create a graphite drawing commemorating the victory.

The completed work depicted McIlroy celebrating on the 18th green at Augusta National Golf Club, surrounded by patrons, the clubhouse, and other architectural elements. Hall spent approximately six months and an estimated 600 to 800 hours creating the drawing with a mechanical pencil.

McIlroy gifted the original artwork to Augusta National. Hall and McIlroy also signed a limited collection of prints produced exclusively for the club's membership.

== Topps baseball cards ==
Hall created a 50-card art insert set for the 2025 Topps Baseball Update Series. The collection featured hand-drawn portraits of Major League Baseball players rendered in Hall's photorealistic style.

Topps promoted the collection as the “Keegan Hall Art Cards” series. The cards appeared in Topps' flagship Update Series alongside autographs, memorabilia cards, and other collectible inserts.

The project brought Hall's graphite artwork into the sports-card market and made his work available through a nationally distributed Topps baseball release.

== Sports and institutional collaborations ==
Hall has produced original artwork, commemorative editions, promotional campaigns, and fan giveaways in collaboration with professional sports teams and institutions.

In 2016, Seattle Sounders FC selected Hall to create an official poster associated with the MLS Cup Final. The Sounders subsequently defeated Toronto FC to win the club's first MLS Cup championship.

Hall later created a composition featuring the Sounders' fan-selected Best XI. Reproductions of the drawing were distributed to 20,000 spectators at a Sounders match.

His other projects have involved organizations and figures associated with the Seattle Seahawks, Seattle Mariners, Seattle Storm, professional and collegiate sports programs, and universities.

Hall has also created artwork for athletes including Michael Jordan, Rory McIlroy, Kelly Slater, Ken Griffey Jr, Giannis Antetokounmpo, Marshawn Lynch, Gary Payton, Russell Wilson, and many other professional athletes.

== Music and entertainment ==
Hall has worked closely on projects with musicians and entertainers including Pearl Jam vocalist Eddie Vedder, Foo Fighters vocalist Dave Grohl, and hip-hop duo Macklemore and Ryan Lewis, singer Ciara, and more. These works were used to support charitable initiatives, and include signed editions by Hall and each musician and have been sold through fundraising campaigns and auctions.

== Obama artwork ==
Hall created a graphite drawing of President Barack Obama and First Lady Michelle Obama that was presented to Obama as a gift from Washington governor Jay Inslee.

The artwork is not part of the National Archives at the Barack Obama Presidential Library in Chicago.

== Philanthropy ==
Hall has used original artwork and limited-edition print campaigns to raise money for charitable organizations.Hall has also been involved with various community initiatives to raise money for charity.

His first fundraiser was with Seattle Seahawks Cornerback Richard Sherman, which sold out on the first day and raised over $40,000 for The Blanket Coverage Foundation. He then went on to work with stars such as NBA player Giannis Antetokounmpo, Surfing Legend Kelly Slater, University of Washington Football, University of Alabama Football, Seattle Mariners outfielder Julio Rodriguez, Atlanta Falcons Quarterback Michael Penix Jr, UFC legend BJ Penn, Seattle Seahawks Quarterback Russell Wilson, Macklemore and Ryan Lewis, Seattle SuperSonics' Gary Payton, NFL stars JuJu Smith-Schuster and Adoree' Jackson, Seahawks Michael Bennett, and many others.

The campaigns have supported organizations focused on children, education, families, healthcare, and community development. Collectively, projects involving Hall's artwork have raised hundreds of thousands of dollars for charitable causes.

== Style and reception ==
Hall's work has been noted for its photographic appearance despite being created entirely by hand with graphite. His compositions often include complex textures, architecture, crowds, and hundreds or thousands of small individual details.

His artistic process has been featured by national and regional media, including NBC's "Today", "The Kelly Clarkson Show", USA Today, GOLF.com, KING-TV's "Evening", and GeekWire.

Hall documents many of his drawings through time-lapse video, compressing months of work into short process films. His work frequently explores the contrast between the simplicity of a pencil and the complexity achievable through extended manual labor.

== Personal life ==
Hall lives in the Seattle metropolitan area with his wife, Ioana, and daughter, Payton.
