= Keegan Pereira =

Keegan Pereira may refer to:

- Keegan Pereira (field hockey) (born 1991), Canadian field hockey player
- Keegan Pereira (footballer) (born 1987), Indian footballer
