= Raja Farzan =

Pakistani cricketer (born 1995)

Personal information
- Full name: Raja Farzan Khan
- Born: 12 May 1995 (age 31); Lahore, Punjab, Pakistan
- Batting: Left-handed
- Bowling: Right Arm Leg Break Spin

Domestic team information
- Years: Team
- 2018; (Note: Not in PSL.) 2020: Lahore Qalandars (squad no. 5)
- Source: Cricinfo, 9 December 2019

Raja Farzan Khan (Punjabi, Urdu: راجہ فرزان خان) (born 12 May 1995) is a Pakistani cricketer. He made his List A debut for Lahore Whites in the 2018–19 Quaid-e-Azam One Day Cup on 22 September 2018. He made his Twenty20 debut for the Lahore Qalandars in the 2018 Abu Dhabi T20 Trophy on 4 October 2018. He was picked by the Lahore Qalandars for the 2020 Pakistan Super League. He was picked from their Player Development Program.
