= Keegan Caldwell =

American lawyer, chemist and businessman (born 1979)

- Born: Keegan M. Caldwell; April 20, 1979 (age 47)
- Education: Western Michigan University (B.S.); George Washington University (Ph.D.)
- Occupations: Businessman, chemist, entrepreneur

Keegan M. Caldwell is an American lawyer and entrepreneur. He is the founder and global managing partner of Caldwell Law (formerly Caldwell Intellectual Property Law), an international law firm whose practice areas include corporate transactions, corporate law, intellectual property, and intellectual property litigation.

== Early life and education ==
Caldwell grew up in Michigan. During his senior year of high school in 1997, he enlisted in the United States Marine Corps. After finishing his service in the Marine Corps. in his 20s, Caldwell suffered from a drug addiction and was convicted of six felonies. After seeking treatment, Caldwell continued his education, earning a Bachelor of Science degree from Western Michigan University and a Ph.D. in physical chemistry from George Washington University.

== Addiction and sobriety ==
Caldwell struggled with a narcotics addiction for about a decade, starting in his teen years, and eventually became homeless, cut off from friends and family. From 2003 to 2006, Caldwell said he was arrested 13 times and accumulated six felony convictions. He described himself as a “desperate person doing what I needed to do,” not a “criminal mastermind.” Newly sober in the mid-2000s, he was living in a men's shelter and meeting weekly with a social worker whom he eventually told he wanted to go to college. He is committed to his sobriety, openly discussing his 12-step recovery and how that has changed his life.

== Career ==
As a chemist, Caldwell researched topics such as dealloyed PtCo_{x} catalysts, the effects of H_{3}PO_{4} in high-temperature polymer electrolyte fuel cells, and Pt-alloy catalysts in proton exchange membrane fuel cells.

Caldwell later developed an interest in becoming a patent agent and interned in the U.S. Patent and Trademark Office. He also served as a registered patent agent for the IP firm Merritt & Merritt & Moulton and as a patent advisor at Downs Rachlin Martin PLLC. After passing the patent bar in 2016, Caldwell founded Caldwell Law and subsequently became a registered lawyer by passing the Vermont State Bar exam.

Caldwell currently represents Solos Technology Ltd. in a multibillion-dollar federal patent infringement lawsuit concerning smart eyewear technologies that names Meta Platforms Inc. and EssilorLuxottica SA as defendants.

== Reducing recidivism ==
In 2022, Caldwell launched the Incarcerated Innovators Program to help current and aspiring entrepreneurs obtain patents for their inventions and guide them in furthering their entrepreneurial dreams. Thomas Alston, who is serving a 27-year federal prison sentence, contacted Caldwell to help him secure a patent for his invention, which was granted by the USPTO. Caldwell has also helped Bruce Bryan secure a patent for his platform designed to help inmates and former inmates pursue wrongful conviction claims by providing a database of all parties involved in previously overturned cases, including prosecutors, judges and public defenders.

== Selected publications ==
- Jia, Q., Caldwell, K., Strickland, K., Ziegelbauer, J. M., Liu, Z., Yu, Z., ... & Mukerjee, S. (2015). Improved oxygen reduction activity and durability of dealloyed PtCo x catalysts for proton exchange membrane fuel cells: strain, ligand, and particle size effects. ACS Catalysis, 5(1), 176–186.
- Kaserer, S., Caldwell, K. M., Ramaker, D. E., & Roth, C. (2013). Analyzing the influence of H3PO4 as catalyst poison in high temperature PEM fuel cells using in-operando X-ray absorption spectroscopy. The Journal of Physical Chemistry C, 117(12), 6210–6217.
- Jia, Q., Li, J., Caldwell, K., Ramaker, D. E., Ziegelbauer, J. M., Kukreja, R. S., ... & Mukerjee, S. (2016). Circumventing metal dissolution induced degradation of Pt-alloy catalysts in proton exchange membrane fuel cells: revealing the asymmetric volcano nature of redox catalysis. ACS Catalysis, 6(2), 928–938.
- Jia, Q., Segre, C. U., Ramaker, D., Caldwell, K., Trahan, M., & Mukerjee, S. (2013). Structure–property–activity correlations of Pt-bimetallic nanoparticles: A theoretical study. Electrochimica Acta, 88, 604–613.
- Jia, Q., Caldwell, K., Ramaker, D. E., Ziegelbauer, J. M., Liu, Z., Yu, Z., ... & Mukerjee, S. (2014). In situ spectroscopic evidence for ordered core–ultrathin shell Pt1Co1 nanoparticles with enhanced activity and stability as oxygen reduction electrocatalysts. The Journal of Physical Chemistry C, 118(35), 20496–20503.
- Caldwell, K. M., Ramaker, D. E., Jia, Q., Mukerjee, S., Ziegelbauer, J. M., Kukreja, R. S., & Kongkanand, A. (2015). Spectroscopic in situ Measurements of the Relative Pt Skin Thicknesses and Porosities of Dealloyed PtM n (Ni, Co) Electrocatalysts. The Journal of Physical Chemistry C, 119(1), 757-765.
- Jia, Q., Caldwell, K., Ziegelbauer, J. M., Kongkanand, A., Wagner, F. T., Mukerjee, S., & Ramaker, D. E. (2014). The role of OOH binding site and Pt surface structure on ORR activities. Journal of The Electrochemical Society, 161(14), F1323.
