= Lyne Bessette =

Canadian cyclist

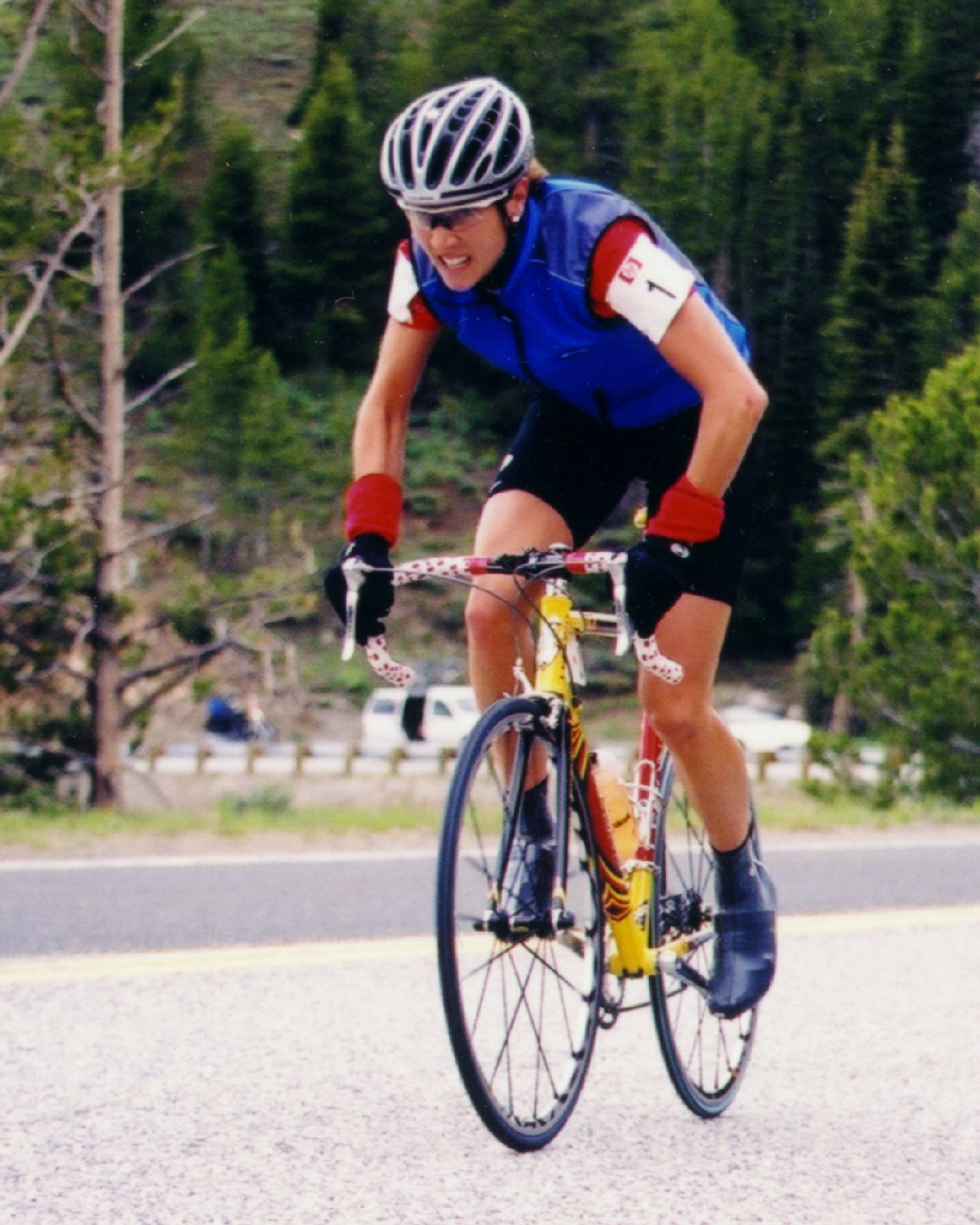

Member of Parliament for Brome—Missisquoi
- In office 21 October 2019 – 19 September 2021
- Preceded by: Denis Paradis
- Succeeded by: Pascale St-Onge

Personal details
- Born: 10 March 1975 (age 51) Lac Brome, Quebec, Canada
- Party: Liberal
- Domestic partner: Divorced
- Profession: Athlete
- Cycling career
- Sport: Cycling
- Current team: Retired
- Disciplines: Road; Cyclo-cross
- Role: Rider

Professional teams
- 1999–2003: Saturn Cycling Team
- 2006: Team T-Mobile Women
Medal record
Representing Canada
Women's road cycling
Paralympic Games
Gold medal – first place	2012 London	Road race B (pilot)
Commonwealth Games
Gold medal – first place	1998 Kuala Lumpur	Road race
Bronze medal – third place	2002 Manchester	Individual time trial
Pan American Games
Silver medal – second place	1999 Winnipeg	Individual time trial

Lyne Bessette (born 10 March 1975 in Lac Brome, Quebec, Canada) is a politician and retired professional bicycle racer from Quebec, Canada. She was elected to represent the riding of Brome—Missisquoi in the 2019 federal election as a member of the Liberal Party of Canada.

Bessette was a member of the Canadian Olympic team in 2000 and 2004. She won the Tour de l'Aude Feminin in 1999 and 2001 and the Women's Challenge in 2001.

Bessette was the pilot for para-cyclist and para-Nordic skier Robbi Weldon's gold medal wins at the 2012 Summer Paralympics Women's road race B and 2010 Union Cycliste Internationale (UCI) World Para-cycling Championships. Even though she retired from professional bike racing in 2006, in 2018, she was appointed Garneau ambassador.

Bessette declined to seek re-election in July 2021 ahead of the year's federal election.

Bessette was inducted into the FQSC hall of fame in November 2022

== Record of achievements ==
=== 1999 ===
- 20th Time Trial UCI Road World Championships
- 7th Tour de Suisse Feminin

2nd Prologue
6th Stage 3, Göschenen to Göscheneralp time trial
3rd Stage 4, Embrach to Embrach
1st Mountains Jersey (QOM)

- 2nd Killington Stage Race

2nd Stage 1, Brandon Gap Road Race
5th Stage 2, Rutland Criterium
6th Stage 3, Saab Road Race

- 2nd GP Feminin du Quebec

1st Stage 2, Lac Brome Road Circuit Race
1st Stage 3, Sutton Road Circuit Race
4th Stage 4, Bedford Road Circuit Race
1st Stage 5, Brigham Time Trial
5th Stage 6, Cowansville Criterium

- 2nd Pan American Games Time Trial
- Women's Challenge (2.9.1)

2nd Stage 5, Sun Valley Circuit Race
2nd Stage 12, Statehouse Criterium

- 2nd Montreal (Can) World Cup
- 1st Tour de l'Aude (2.9.1)

5th Prologue, Gruissan time trial
4th Stage 2, Rieux Minervois
3rd Stage 5, Castelnaudary time trial
2nd Stage 6a, Mazamet to Pic de Nore
8th Stage 6b, Pradelles Cabardes to Mazamet
2nd Stage 8a, Quillan to Matemale
4th Stage 8b, Matemale to Quillan

- 1st Tour of Willamette

3rd Prologue Time Trial
2nd Stage 1, Hinman Vineyards Road Race
3rd Stage 3, Brownsville Road Race
3rd Stage 4, Time Trial

- 2nd Sea Otter Classic

3rd Stage 1, time trial
3rd Stage 3, circuit race

- 1st Redlands Bicycle Classic

3rd QOM
2nd Stage 1
4th Stage 2

=== 2000 ===
- 2nd Killington Stage Race

2nd Points Classification
3rd Stage 1, Brandon Gap Road Race
4th Stage 2, Rutland Criterium
3rd Stage 3

- 4th GP Féminine International du Québec (2.9.2)

2nd Points Classification
2nd Mountains Classification
2nd Stage 1, Farnham to Farnham
1st Stage 3, Richford to Lac Brome
6th Stage 4, Bedford Time Trial
5th Stage 6, Sutton to Mount Sutton

- 1st Tour de 'Toona

2nd Stage 1, Altoona Time Trial
1st Stage 3, Hollidaysburg Circuit Race
1st Stage 5, Verizon Circuit Race
2nd Stage 6, Downtown Altoona Criterium

- 5th Stage 1, Blue Cosmos Design Time Trial, Wendy's International Cycling Classic
- 1st Fitchburg Longsjo Classic

3rd Stage 1, Royal Plaza Time Trial
4th Stage 2, Aubuchon/Gudden Road Race
1st Stage 3, Unitil/FG&E Road Race
10th Stage 4, Downtown Criterium

Women's Challenge

10th Stage 4, Rupert to Pomerelle
7th Stage 5, Burley South Individual Time Trial
10th Stage 6, Burley to Buhl

- 12th Montreal (Can) World Cup
- 10th Tour de l'Aude

8th Prologue, Gruissan Time Tria;
10th Stage 2a (Rieux-Minervois to Pic de Nore
2nd Stage 4 (Port Lauragais to Port Lauragais
8th Stage 5 (Castelnaudary Time Trial

- 3rd Tour of Willamette

2nd Prologue, Skinner's Butte Time Trial
1st Stage 1, Greenhill Road Race
9th Stage 2, Smith River Road Race
3rd Stage 3, Kill Hill Road Race
3rd Stage 4, Coburg Time Trial
3rd Stage 6, Brownsville Road Race

- 5th Sea Otter Classic

4th Prologue (Laguna Time Trial)

- 2nd Redlands Bicycle Classic

2nd Climber's Classification
4th Prologue, San Bernardino Street Sprints
2nd Stage 1, East Highlands Circuit Race
3rd Stage 2, East Highlands Time Trial
7th Stage 3, Lake Matthews to Oak Glen Road Race

- Sequoia Cycling Classic

5th Rocky Hill Road Race

- McLane-Pacific Bicycle Classic

6th Merced Downtown Criterium
8th Foothills Road Race

=== 2001 ===
- 12th UCI rankings
- Tour de Suisse Feminin (2.9.1)

2nd Stage 1 (Sarnen Time Trial)
9th Stage 2 (Sarnen)

- 3rd, Overall, GP Féminin International du Canada (2.9.2)

10th, Stage 1 (Farnham to Farnham)
6th, Stage 2 (Frelighsburg)
1st, Stage 3 (Richford to Lac Brome)
1st, Stage 4 (Bedford Time Trial, 19.1 km)
3rd, Stage 6 (Sutton to Mont-Sutton)

- 10th, Timex International Women's Open
- Tour de 'Toona

2nd, Stage 1, Time Trial
1st, Stage 2
8th, Stage 3

- 1st Canada Canadian National Time Trial Cycling Championships
- 1st Canada Canadian National Road Race Cycling Championships
- 1st BMC Software Tour of Arlington
- 1st Fitchburg-Longsjo Classic

1st Stage 1, Time Trial
2nd Stage 2, Circuit Race
2nd Stage 3, Road Race
4th Stage 4, Criterium

- 1st Women's Challenge (2.9.1)

1st Points Classification
2nd Mountains Classification
4th Sprints Classification
2nd Stage 1, Boise to Idaho City
2nd Stage 3, Stanley to Ketchum
1st Stage 4, Sun Valley Time Trial, 5.1 km
2nd Stage 5, Elkhorn Resort Circuit Race
10th Stage 6, Shoshone to Burley
2nd Stage 7, Burley to Pomerelle
5th Stage 8, Burley to Magic Mountain
1st Stage 9, Twin Falls to Buhl
1st Stage 11, Emmett to Firebird Time Trial, 21 km
6th Stage 12, Idaho Statehouse Criterium

- 3rd, Montréal (Can) World Cup
- 1st Tour de l'Aude (2.9.1)

2nd Points Classification
1st Mountains Classification
5th Sprints Classification
6th Prologue, Gruissan Time Trial, 3 km
7th Stage 1, Coursan to Coursan
2nd Stage 2, Rieux Minervois to Rieux Minervois
8th Stage 5, Castelnaudary Time Trial, 26.5 km
2nd Stage 6, Castelnaudary to Castelnaudary
5th Stage 7a, Castelnaudary to Bram
4th Stage 7b, Bram to Limoux
2nd Stage 9, Limoux to Limoux

- 3rd Tour of the Gila

3rd Stage 1, Tyrone Time Trial, 15.7 miles
2nd Stage 2, Silver City to Mogollan Road Race
2nd Stage 3, Inner Loop Road Race) - 2nd place
4th Stage 4, Downtown Silver City Criterium
3rd Stage 5, Gila Monster Road Race

- Redlands Bicycle Classic (2.9.2)

2nd Stage 1, Mt. Rubidoux Time Trial, 5 km
3rd Stage 2, Highland Road Race

- Sequoia Cycling Classic

1st Rocky Hill Road Race
4th Visalia Criterium

- 1st Stage 2, Foothills Road Race, McLane-Pacific Grand Prix

=== 2002 ===
- 20th UCI Rankings
- 13th GP Suisse (Swi) féminin World Cup
- 3rd Canadian National Time Trial Championships
- 6th Canadian National Road Race Championships
- 3rd Time Trial, Commonwealth Games
- 7th Road Race, Commonwealth Games
- 1st Fitchburg Longsjo Classic

1st Sprints Classification
1st Stage 1, Royal Plaza Time Trial
1st Stage 2, Circuit Race
1st Stage 3, Wachusett Mountain Road Race

- 5th Women's Challenge (2.9.1)

8th Stage 2, Lowman to Stanley
5th Stage 3, Stanley Time Trial, 40 km
3rd Stage 5, Shoshone to Pomerelle
5th Stage 6, Burley to Magic Mountain
4th Stage 8, Idaho Statehouse Criterium

- 5th Le Tour du Montréal (2.9.2)

4th Stage 1, Lachine Time Trial, 3 km

- 2nd La Flèche Wallonne (Bel) World Cup
- 6th Montréal (Can) World Cup
- 4th Damesronde van Drenthe (1.9.1)
- 2nd Overall, Solano Bicycle Classic

1st Stage 1, Lagoon Valley Road Race
2nd Stage 2, Montezuma Hills Time Trial

- 1st Sea Otter Classic

3rd Stage 1, Laguna Seca time trial, 27.2 km
5th Stage 2, Cannery Row Criterium
3rd Stage 3, Fort Ord Road Race
1st Stage 4, Laguna Seca Circuit Race

- 4th Redlands Bicycle Classic

3rd QOM Classification
3rd Stage 1, Mt. Rubidoux Time Trial
1st Stage 2, Highland Circuit Race
5th Stage 3, Oak Glen Road Race
4th Stage 4, Beaver Medical Group Criterium
2nd Stage 5, Sunset Road Race

- Sequoia Cycling Classic

2nd, Rocky Hill Road Race
10th Visalia Criterium

- McLane-Pacific Bicycle Classic

2nd Stage 1, Merced Downtown Criterium
1st Stage 2, McLane-Pacific Road Race

=== 2003 ===
1st International Tour de Toona
2nd Tour de l'Aude Cycliste Féminin

=== 2004 ===
1st Nature Valley Grand Prix
1st International Tour de Toona
16th Summer Olympics Time Trial

=== 2006 ===
1st New England Championship Cyclo-Cross Series (NECCS) Round #6, W.E. Stedman Grand Prix

=== 2007 ===
1st Female Age 30-39 Paris to Ancaster 14th Annual Classic

=== 2015 ===
1st Female Gaspesia 100 MTB Marathon - 50 miles

=== 2016 ===
1st Female Gaspesia 100 MTB Marathon - 100 miles (1st Female to complete a 100 miles mtb race in Quebec.

=== 2017 ===
1st Female Gaspesia 100 MTB Marathon - 100 miles
10th Gran Prix of Gloucester, Day 2
1st Female Triathlon CanadaMan Xtri World tour du Lac Mégantic

=== 2018 ===
1st Female Triathlon CanadaMan Xtri World tour du Lac Mégantic

=== 2019 ===
2nd Female Triathlon CanadaMan Xtri World tour du Lac Mégantic

=== 2021 ===
2nd Female Triathlon CanadaMan Xtri World tour du Lac Mégantic
First female to complete the Gravel Bike Packing Challenge 500 (Team)

=== 2022 ===
2nd female Gaspesia 100 - 100k ultra-trail
1st female Gravel Bike Packing Challenge 500 Solo (23h17min)

== Electoral record ==
2019 Canadian federal election: Brome—Missisquoi
Party	Candidate	Votes	%	±%	Expenditures
Liberal	Lyne Bessette	23,450	38.2	-5.68	none listed
Bloc Québécois	Monique Allard	21,152	34.4	+16.93	$19,373.49
Conservative	Bruno Côté	7,697	12.5	+1.04	$17,284.00
New Democratic	Sylvie Jetté	4,887	8.0	-16.51	$7,266.26
Green	Normand Dallaire	3,302	5.4	+3.05	$8,943.15
People's	François Poulin	456	0.7		none listed
Rhinoceros	Steeve Cloutier	310	0.5		none listed
Veterans Coalition	Lawrence Cotton	187	0.3	$0.00	
Total valid votes/expense limit		61,441	100.0		
Total rejected ballots		962			
Turnout		62,403	70.1		
Eligible voters		89,071			
Liberal hold		Swing		-11.31	
Source: Elections Canada
