= Kegan Lake =

Lake in the state of Minnesota, United States

- Location within Minnesota
- Location: Dakota County, Minnesota
- Coordinates: 44°45′30″N 93°6′59″W
- Type: lake

Kegan Lake is a lake in Dakota County, in the U.S. state of Minnesota.

Kegan Lake was named for Andrew Keegan, a pioneer farmer.

== See also ==
- List of lakes in Minnesota
