= Jack White (Australian cricketer) =

Australian cricketer (born 1999)

Personal information
- Born: 8 July 1999 (age 27)

Career statistics
Competition	T20
Matches	2
Runs scored	16
Batting average	16.00
100s/50s	0/0
Top score	12*
Balls bowled	6
Wickets	0
Bowling average	-
5 wickets in innings	0
10 wickets in match	0
Best bowling	0/9
Catches/stumpings	0/–
- Source: Cricinfo, 5 October 2021

Jack White (born 8 July 1999) is an Australian cricketer. In September 2018, he was named in the Hobart Hurricanes' squad for the 2018 Abu Dhabi T20 Trophy. He made his Twenty20 debut for the Hobart Hurricanes in the 2018 Abu Dhabi T20 Trophy on 5 October 2018. In May 2019, he signed a rookie contract with Tasmania ahead of the 2019–20 season.
