= Keegan Gaunt =

Canadian middle-distance runner

Personal information
- Born: April 27, 2000 (age 25) Thunder Bay, Ontario, Canada
- Parents: Robert Gaunt (father); Robbi Weldon (mother)

Sport
- Sport: Para-athletics
- Disability class: T13

Keegan Gaunt (born April 27, 2000) is a Canadian visually-impaired middle-distance runner.

== Early life and education ==
Gaunt was born and raised in Thunder Bay, Ontario. She is the daughter of Robbi Weldon, a para-cyclist who won gold at the 2012 Paralympic Games, and Robert Gaunt, who won silver on the Canadian men's goalball team at the 1996 Paralympic Games.

Like her mother, Gaunt was diagnosed with Stargardt Disease as a teenager. She trained with the Ottawa Lions Track and Field Club. She is a graduate of Merivale High School and has a bachelor of commerce at the University of Guelph.

== Career ==
At the 2018 Canadian Championships, Gaunt won the para-ambulatory 400-metre. She won the Para women's T13 1500-metre title at the Canadian track nationals, setting a new Canadian record. She trained, but did not race during the 2022 season.

Gaunt made her Parapan American Games debut at the 2023 Games in Chile. She placed third in the women's T13 1500-metre race at the Games, but did not receive a medal as there were only three competitors. Gaunt competed for Canada in the 1500-metre and 400-metre events at the 2024 Summer Paralympics. She placed twelfth out of fourteen athletes in the 400-metre heats with a time of 1:03:16 and did not advance to the finals. She placed ninth in the women’s T13 1500-metre.
