= Mayalen Noriega =

Spanish cyclist (born 1982)

María Mayalen Noriega
Personal information
- Nationality: Spanish
- Born: 19 February 1982 (age 44) Mexico

Sport
- Country: Spain
- Sport: Cycling

María Mayalen Noriega is a Spanish cyclist who competes in regular cycling and Paralympic cycling as a pilot for Josefa Benítez Guzman, with whom she won a silver medal at the 2012 Summer Paralympics. She has also served as a guide for Susana Rodríguez in the paratriathlon.

== Personal ==
Noriega was born on 19 February 1982 in Mexico. Her ancestry is from the Catalan region of Spain, and she now lives in Mataró, Barcelona. In 2013, she was awarded the silver Real Orden al Mérito Deportivo. In 2013, she had a broken scapula following a fall after a chain on her bicycle broke. This forced her to sit out of competitive sport for a few weeks. According to one of the sportspeople Noriega has been a guide for, she loves competition.

== Swimming ==
Her first sport was swimming. As a youngster, Noriega set national records in swimming in Mexico.

== Cycling ==
Noriega is a cyclist who competes individually, and as a pilot for vision impaired cyclists.

At the 2011 Stage National TT Championships Spain, Noriega finished fifth. She competed in the 2012 Spanish track cycling championships, and was one of the underdogs. In January 2012, she competed at the Ciutat de Palma Trophy IV as a pilot for Josefa Benítez Guzman. From the Catalan region of Spain, she was a recipient of a 2012 Plan ADOP scholarship.

Noriega competed at the 2012 Summer Paralympics in cycling as the pilot for Josefa Benítez Guzman. The pair won a silver medal at the Games in a road event. Following the London Games, she had an intention of focusing less on being a pilot and more on her individual cycling career.

In June 2013, Noriega competed in the Spanish national championships, finishing second in the women's road race. In 2013, she won the Girona City Cyclocross event in the women's category. Noriega has been a member of the Bizkaia–Durango cycling team in 2013 and 2014.

== Triathlon ==
In 2012, Noriega competed in the Paratriathlon World Championships as the guide for Susana Rodríguez. She served as Rodríguez's guide for the 2013 Para-triathlon World Championships in London. Going into the event, she said that she was unsure if she would be able to match Rodríguez's stroke.
