= Karl Carver =

English cricketer

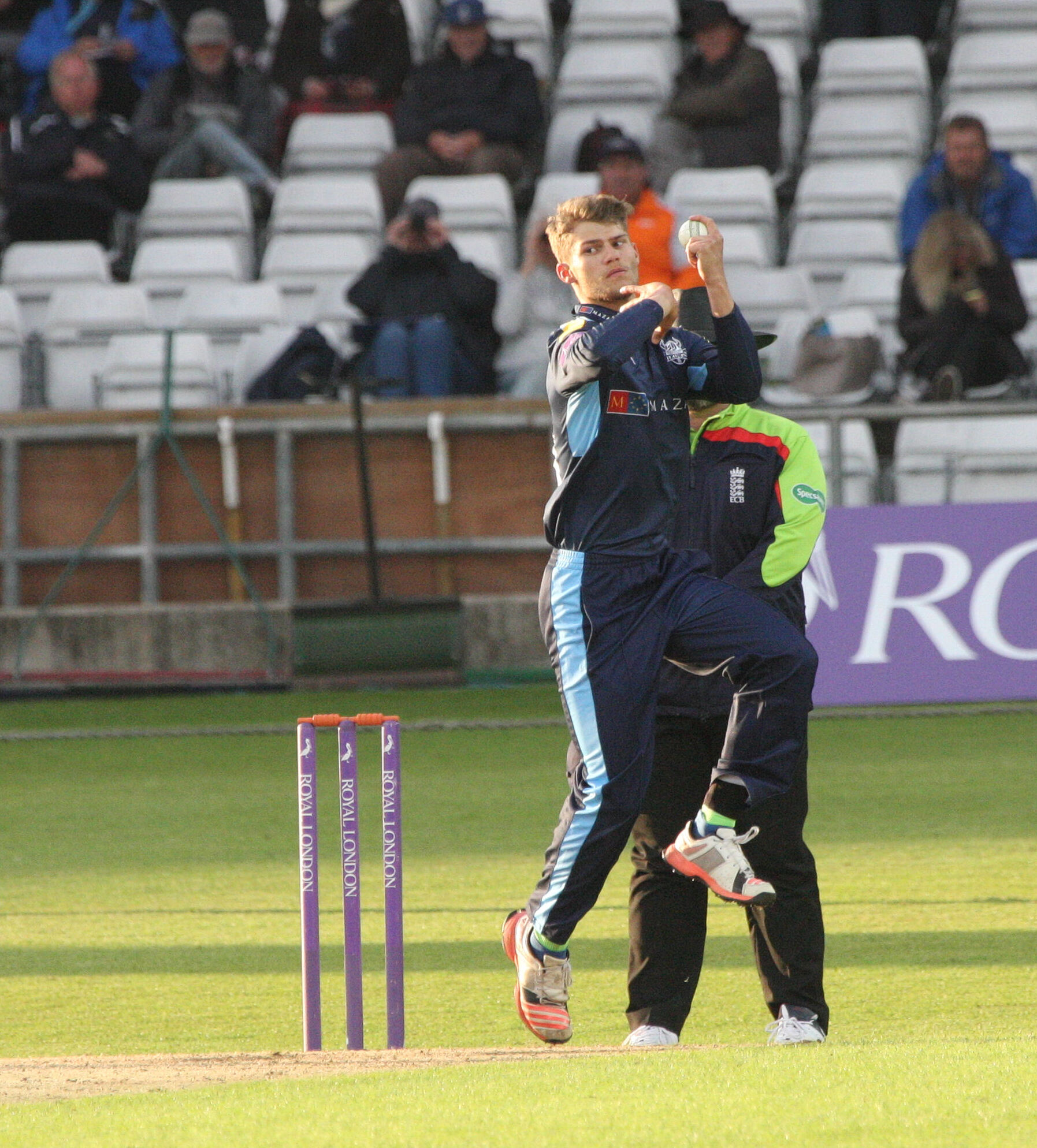
- Carver in 2017

Personal information
- Born: 26 March 1996 (age 30); Thirsk, North Yorkshire, England
- Batting: Left-handed
- Bowling: Slow left-arm orthodox
- Role: Bowler

Domestic team information
- Years: Team
- 2014–2019: Yorkshire (squad no. 29)
- 2021: Warwickshire
- FC debut: 22 June 2014 Yorkshire v Warwickshire
- LA debut: 29 July 2015 Yorkshire v Surrey

Career statistics
Competition	FC	LA	T20
Matches	8	20	10
Runs scored	108	70	2
Batting average	15.42	70.00	2.00
100s/50s	0/0	0/0	0/0
Top score	20	35*	2
Balls bowled	946	726	132
Wickets	18	19	8
Bowling average	30.16	33.84	26.00
5 wickets in innings	0	0	0
10 wickets in match	0	0	0
Best bowling	4/106	3/5	3/40
Catches/stumpings	4/–	2/–	5/–
- Source: CricketArchive, 28 August 2021

Karl Carver (born 26 March 1996) is an English first-class cricketer. A left-handed batsman and slow left arm orthodox bowler, Carver was previously contracted to Yorkshire County Cricket Club, for whom he played his debut first-class match in 2014. In July 2021, Carver signed with Warwickshire to play for the side for three weeks during the 2021 Royal London One-Day Cup.

== Biography ==
Carver had been with Yorkshire since 2009, starting at under 14 level. He went on to play for the Yorkshire Academy in the Yorkshire ECB County Premier League, and the Yorkshire Second XI, the England Under-19 cricket team, as well as appearing in his debut first-class match for Yorkshire. This was against Warwickshire in June 2014.

Carver had only played two County Championship matches by the end of 2015. However, that was sufficient to earn him two Championship-winning medals, as he played a bit-part role in both of Yorkshire's triumphs in 2014 and 2015.

On 23 July 2017, Carver conceded 6 sixes in a single over delivered to Ross Whiteley, which also contained a wide. He left Yorkshire CCC at the end of the 2019 season.
