= Keegan Phiri =

Zambian footballer (born 1983)

Personal information
- Date of birth: 9 September 1983 (age 43)
- Place of birth: Lusaka, Zambia
- Height: 1.82 m (6 ft 0 in)
- Position: Forward

Senior career*
Years	Team	Apps	(Gls)
2003–2014	Nkwazi F.C.		
2015–2016	NAPSA Stars F.C.		
2015–2017	Nkwazi F.C.		

International career
2004	Zambia	2	(0)
- * Club domestic league appearances and goals

Keegan Phiri (born 9 September 1983) is a retired Zambian football striker.
