= Henrike Handrup =

German Paralympic cyclist (born 1983)

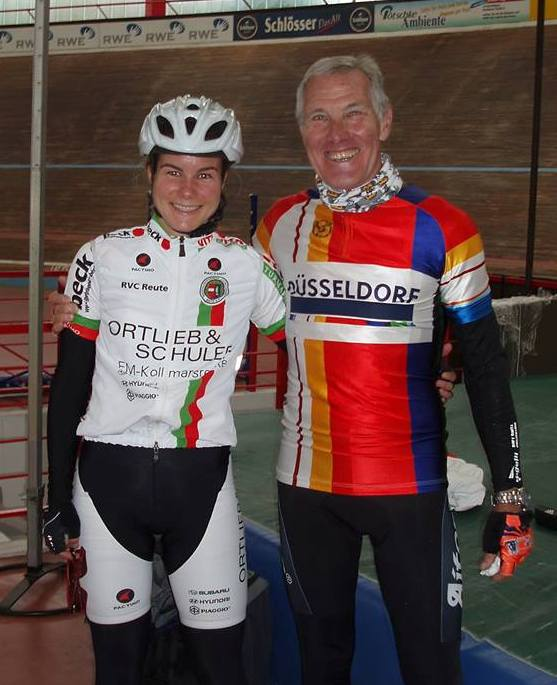
- Handrup with Udo Hempel

Personal information
- Born: 9 March 1983 (age 43) Wuppertal, Germany

Sport
- Country: Germany
- Sport: Paralympic cycling
- Disability class: B2
Medal record
Paralympic cycling
Representing Germany
World Road Championships
Gold medal – first place	2010 Baie-Comeau	Road race B2
Silver medal – second place	2010 Baie-Comeau	Time trial B2
Bronze medal – third place	2009 Bogogno	Road race B2
World Track Championships
Bronze medal – third place	2009 Manchester	Time trial B&VI

Henrike Handrup (born 9 March 1983) is a German former Paralympic cyclist who competes at international elite competitions. She is a World road racing champion and a track bronze medalist has competed at the 2012 Summer Paralympics but did not medal.
