= Keegan Smith =

Keegan Smith may refer to:

- Keegan Smith (footballer, born 1999), New Zealand goalkeeper
- Keegan Smith (soccer, born 2006), American soccer goalkeeper
- Keegan Smith (tennis) (born 1998), American tennis player
