= Keegan Oates =

Australian cricketer (born 2000)

Personal information
- Born: 3 January 2000 (age 26); Hobart, Tasmania, Australia
- Batting: Right-handed
- Bowling: Right-arm off break
- Role: Batsman

Domestic team information
- Years: Team
- 2018: Hobart Hurricanes

Career statistics
Competition	T20
Matches	1
Runs scored	3
Batting average	3.00
100s/50s	0/0
Top score	3
Balls bowled	-
Wickets	-
Bowling average	-
5 wickets in innings	-
10 wickets in match	-
Best bowling	-/-
Catches/stumpings	0/–
- Source: Cricinfo, 5 October 2021

Keegan Oates (born 3 January 2000) is an Australian cricketer. In September 2018, he was named in the Hobart Hurricanes' squad for the 2018 Abu Dhabi T20 Trophy. He made his Twenty20 debut for the Hobart Hurricanes in the 2018 Abu Dhabi T20 Trophy on 6 October 2018.
