= Joleen Hakker =

Dutch athlete (born 1981)

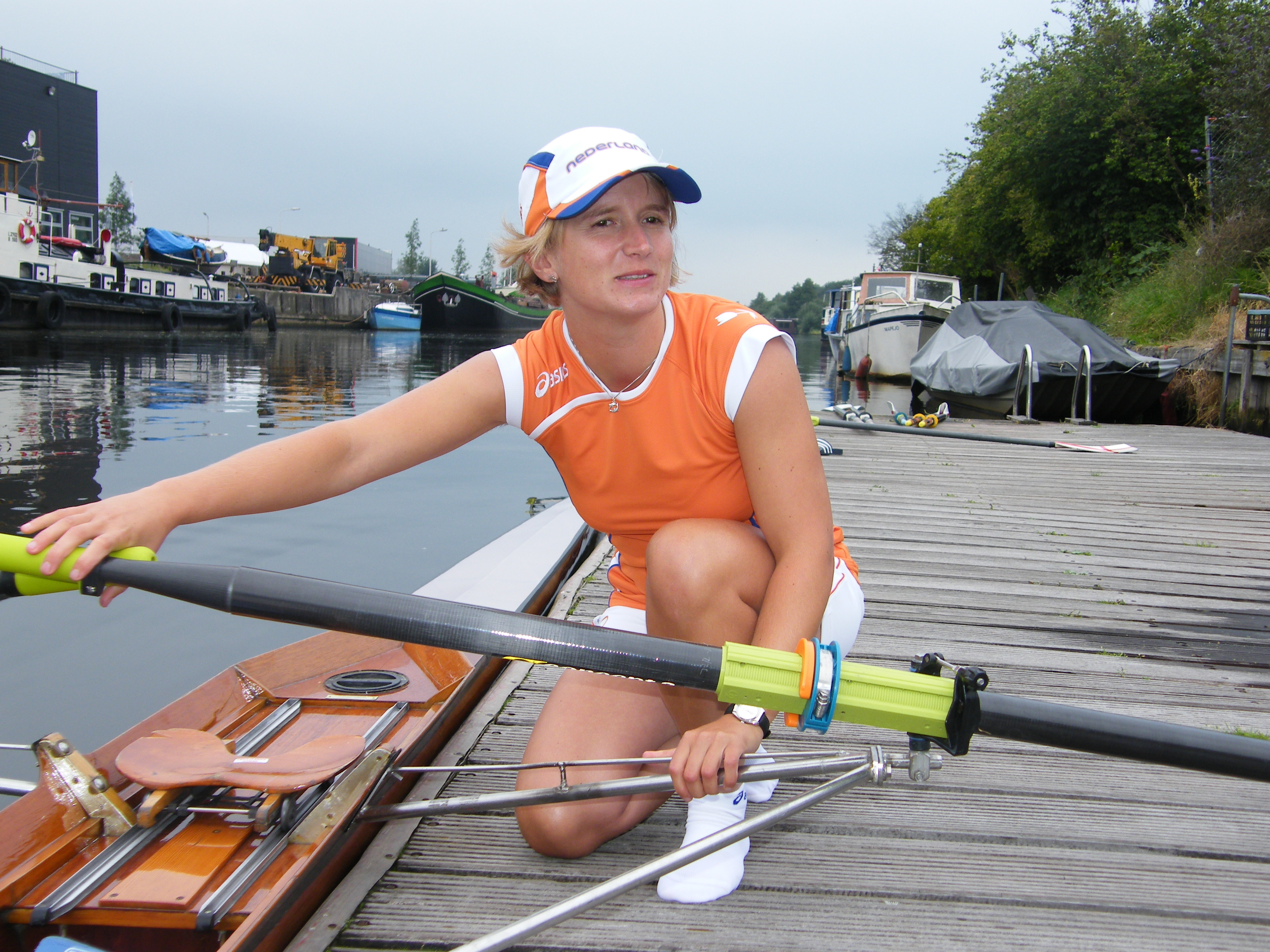

Personal information
- Born: 30 May 1981 (age 45) Soest, Netherlands
- Height: 1.57 m (5 ft 2 in)
- Weight: 50 kg (110 lb)

Sport
- Country: Netherlands
- Sport: Adaptive rowing Paralympic cycling Paratriathlon
Medal record
Representing Netherlands
Adaptive rowing
World Rowing Championships
Silver medal – second place	2004 Banyoles	Mixed coxed four
Silver medal – second place	2006 Dorney	Mixed coxed four
Bronze medal – third place	2005 Gifu	Mixed coxed four
Women's paratriathlon
World Championships
Silver medal – second place	2013 London	TRI 6a
Silver medal – second place	2016 Rotterdam	PT5
European Championships
Gold medal – first place	2009 Holten	TRI 6
Silver medal – second place	2010 Athlone	TRI 6
Silver medal – second place	2015 Geneva	PT5
Bronze medal – third place	2011 Pontevedra	TRI 6
Men's para-duathlon
European Championships
Gold medal – first place	2016 Kalkar	PT5

Joleen Slijp Hakker (born 30 May 1981) is a Dutch multi-sport blind competitor who competed in adaptive rowing, Paralympic cycling and paratriathlon. She has won three medals in adaptive rowing at the World Rowing Championships and participated at the 2008 Summer Paralympics, double silver medalist in paratriathlon and participated at the 2016 Summer Paralympics.
