= Josefa Benítez =

Spanish cyclist (born 1969)

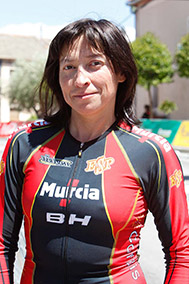

Personal information
- Full name: Josefa Benítez Guzman
- Nationality: Spanish
- Born: 30 August 1969 (age 56) Barcelona, Spain

Sport
- Country: Spain
- Sport: Cycling
Medal record
Women's road cycling
Representing Spain
Paralympic Games
Silver medal – second place	2012 London	Road race B

Josefa Benítez Guzman (born 30 August 1969 in Barcelona) is a cyclist from Spain.

== Personal ==
In 2013, Benítez was awarded the silver Real Orden al Mérito Deportivo.

== Cycling ==
Benítez competed at the 2012 Summer Paralympics. She finished second in the road race.

From the Catalan region of Spain, she was a recipient of a 2012 Plan ADO scholarship.
